= West Series races at Ascot Park =

NASCAR Winston West Series races at Ascot Park

NASCAR Winston West Series races at Ascot Park
NASCAR Winston West Series
- Venue: Ascot Park
- Location: Gardena, California
- First race: 1957
- Last race: 1979
- Distance: 25 mi (40.234 km) (1960, 1962–1963); 50 mi (80.467 km) (1959–1962, 1964–1968, 1970, 1974–1975, 1977–1979); 75 mi (120.701 km) (1957, 1977); 99 mi (159.325 km) (1964); 100 mi (160.934 km) (1961, 1964–1966, 1971); 125 mi (201.168 km) (1972); 243.5 mi (391.875 km) (1959); 250 mi (402.336 km) (1965)
- Laps: 50 (1960, 1962–1963); 100 (1959–1962, 1964–1968, 1970, 1974–1975, 1977–1979); 150 (1957, 1977); 198 (1964); 200 (1961, 1964–1966, 1971); 250 (1972); 487 (1959); 500 (1965)
- Previous names: First races No name (1957, 1959–1963, 1968); Ascot Park 200 Lappers (1964, 1966); Ascot 200 (1965, 1971); Ascot Park 100 Lappers (1967); South Bay 100 (1970); Oly 250 (1972); Ascot Memorial 100 (1974); Memorial 100 (1975); Winston Gardena 150 (1977); Winston Gardena 100 (1978–1979); Second races No name (1959–1962, 1966, 1970); Ascot 200 (1964); Ascot 500 (1965); Ascot 100 (1967–1968); Gardena 100 (1974–1975); Winston Ascot 100 (1977); Third races No name (1960–1962); Ascot 100 (1964, 1966); Ascot 200 (1965); Ascot Park 100 (1967); L.A. International 100 (1975); Fourth races No name (1960–1962, 1964–1966); Fifth races No name (1960–1961, 1964–1965); Sixth races No name (1960); Ascot Grand Prix (1961); Ascot Park 200 (1964); Seventh races No name (1960)
- Most wins (driver): Ray Elder (9)
- Most wins (team): Elder Racing (9)
- Most wins (manufacturer): Ford (27)

Circuit information
- Surface: Dirt
- Length: 0.805 km (0.500 mi)
- Turns: 4

The NASCAR Winston West Series, previously known as the NASCAR Grand National West and NASCAR Pacific Coast Late Model Division, held several races at Ascot Park in Gardena, California. The track hosted the series between 1957 and 1979.

== History ==
The West series first visited Ascot Park in 1957, when Eddie Pagan won a combination race with the NASCAR Grand National Series driving a 1957 Ford. The series returned to the track in 1959 and continued to compete there through 1979, with drivers such as Bill Amick, Marvin Porter, Ray Elder, Scotty Cain, and Jack McCoy securing victories at the track.

== Past winners ==
Year	Date	No.	Driver	Team	Manufacturer	Race Distance		Race Time	Average Speed (mph)	Report	Ref
Year	Date	No.	Driver	Team	Manufacturer	Laps	Miles (km)	Race Time	Average Speed (mph)	Report	Ref
1957	June 8	45	Eddie Pagan	Eddie Pagan	Ford	150*	75 (120.7)			Report	
1958	Not held										
1959	November 16, 1958		Parnelli Jones			100	50 (80.47)			Report	
1959	May 30	97	Parnelli Jones (2)	Vel Miletich	Ford (2)	487*	243.5 (391.88)	3:49:16	50.982	Report	
1960	January 17		Parnelli Jones (3)		Ford (3)	50	25 (40.23)			Report	
1960	March 20		Marvin Porter		Ford (4)	50	25 (40.23)			Report	
1960	May 1		Danny Weinberg		Ford (5)	100	50 (80.47)			Report	
1960	June 25		Eddie Gray					0:22:10		Report	
1960	August 20		Lloyd Dane		Chevrolet			0:21:36	69.440	Report	
1960	October 22		Danny Letner		Ford (6)					Report	
1960	November 20		Danny Letner (2)		Ford (7)	50	25 (40.23)			Report	
1961	January 1	0	Jim Cook		Dodge	100	50 (80.47)			Report	
1961	April 29	98	Eddie Gray (2)		Ford (8)	100	50 (80.47)			Report	
1961	May 27	98	Eddie Gray (3)	Eddie Gray	Ford (9)	200	100 (160.93)	1:27:10	68.833	Report	
1961	July 4		Ron Hornaday		Ford (10)	100	50 (80.47)	0:45:37	65.746	Report	
1961	September 4		Eddie Gray (4)			100	50 (80.47)	0:43:28	69.013	Report	
1961	September 30		Eddie Gray (5)		Ford (11)	100	50 (80.47)	0:45:45	65.555	Report	
1962	December 17, 1961		Don Noel		Ford (12)	100	50 (80.47)	0:51:53		Report	
1962	April 29		Danny Letner (3)		Ford (13)	100	50 (80.47)			Report	
1962	August 4		Eddie Gray (6)		Ford (14)	50	25 (40.23)			Report	
1962	October 28		Eddie Gray (7)		Ford (15)	100	50 (80.47)	0:48:33	61.790	Report	
1963	April 27		Don Noel (2)		Ford (16)	50	25 (40.23)			Report	
1964	June 6	9N	Bill Amick	Dick Niles Racing Team	Mercury	200	100 (160.93)			Report	
1964	August 1	77	Marvin Porter (2)	Vel Miletich (2)	Mercury (2)	200	100 (160.93)			Report	
1964	August 15	23	Bob Perry	Bob Perry	Mercury (3)	100	50 (80.47)	0:46:26	64.609	Report	
1964	September 7	9N	Bill Amick (2)	Dick Niles Racing Team (2)	Mercury (4)	198*	99 (159.33)			Report	
1964	September 19	97	Ron Hornaday (2)	Galpin Ford Racing Team	Ford (17)	100	50 (80.47)			Report	
1964	October 29	61	Dick Bown	Bown Racing	Plymouth	200	100 (160.93)			Report	
1965	March 27	1	Marvin Porter (3)	Carl Dane	Ford (18)	200	100 (160.93)			Report	
1965	May 30	9N	Bill Amick (3)	Dick Niles Racing Team (3)	Mercury (5)	500	250 (402.34)	3:30:22	71.304	Report	
1965	July 4	33	Clem Proctor	Clem Proctor	Ford (19)	200	100 (160.93)	1:25:00	70.588	Report	
1965	September 5	9N	Bill Amick (4)	Dick Niles Racing Team (4)	Mercury (6)	200	100 (160.93)	0:41:18	72.638	Report	
1965	November 7	1	Marvin Porter (4)	Carl Dane (2)	Ford (20)	100	50 (80.47)			Report	
1966	April 30	96	Ray Elder	Elder Racing	Dodge (2)	200	100 (160.93)	1:42:00	58.823	Report	
1966	May 29	1	Marvin Porter (5)	Carl Dane (3)	Ford (21)	200	100 (160.93)			Report	
1966	July 3	45	Scotty Cain	Bill Clinton	Mercury (7)	100	50 (80.47)	0:48:06	62.370	Report	
1966	September 4	1	Marvin Porter (6)	Carl Dane (4)	Ford (22)	100	50 (80.47)			Report	
1967	May 27	96	Ray Elder (2)	Elder Racing (2)	Dodge (3)	100	50 (80.47)			Report	
1967	July 2	45	Scotty Cain (2)	Bill Clinton (2)	Ford (23)	100	50 (80.47)			Report	
1967	September 3	96	Ray Elder (3)	Elder Racing (3)	Dodge (4)	100	50 (80.47)			Report	
1968	April 21	96	Ray Elder (4)	Elder Racing (4)	Dodge (5)	100	50 (80.47)	0:47:03	63.762	Report	
1968	May 2	96	Ray Elder (5)	Elder Racing (5)	Dodge (6)	100	50 (80.47)			Report	
1969	Not held										
1970	April 12	96	Ray Elder (6)	Elder Racing (6)	Dodge (7)	100	50 (80.47)	0:48:39	61.665	Report	
1971	June 5	96	Ray Elder (7)	Elder Racing (7)	Dodge (8)	200	100 (160.93)	1:24:04	71.371	Report	
1972	September 16	02	Dick Bown (2)	Mike Ober	Plymouth (2)	250	125 (201.17)	1:45:00	71.428	Report	
1973	Not held										
1974	May 27	68	Sonny Easley	Vic Kurten	Ford (24)	100	50 (80.47)	0:44:35	24.095	Report	
1974	August 4	96	Ray Elder (8)	Elder Racing (8)	Dodge (9)	100	50 (80.47)	0:53:00	56.603	Report	
1974	September 28	38	Jimmy Insolo	Roger Paquette	Chevrolet (2)	100	50 (80.47)	0:43:00	69.767	Report	
1975	May 26	68	Sonny Easley (2)	Easley Racing	Ford (25)	100	50 (80.47)	0:44:00	68.178	Report	
1975	June 27	96	Ray Elder (9)	Elder Racing (9)	Dodge (10)	100	50 (80.47)	0:53:08	56.461	Report	
1975	August 24	68	Sonny Easley (3)	Easley Racing (2)	Ford (26)	100	50 (80.47)	0:46:59	63.852	Report	
1976	Not held										
1977	May 30	9	Vic Irvan	Joann Irvan	Chevrolet (3)	150	75 (120.7)	1:07:05	67.080	Report	
1977	August 7	68	Sonny Easley (4)	Easley Racing (3)	Ford (27)	100	50 (80.47)	0:46:22	64.701	Report	
1978	August 6	91	John Krebs	John Krebs Racing	Chevrolet (4)	100	50 (80.47)	0:38:54	77.097	Report	
1979	September 8	73	Bill Schmitt	Schmitt Motorsports	Pontiac	100	50 (80.47)	0:43:25	74.953	Report	

Notes

- 1957: Race shortened from 200 to 150 laps due to dust.
- 1959: Race shortened from 500 to 487 laps due to rain.
- 1964: Race shortened from 200 to 198 laps due to a scoring error.

=== Manufacturer wins ===
# Wins	Make	Years Won
27	(United States) Ford	1957, 1959, 1960, 1961, 1962, 1963, 1964, 1965, 1966, 1967, 1974, 1975, 1977
10	(United States) Dodge	1961, 1966, 1967, 1968, 1970, 1971, 1974, 1975
7	(United States) Mercury	1964, 1965, 1966
4	(United States) Chevrolet	1960, 1974, 1977, 198
2	(United States) Plymouth	1964, 1972
1	(United States) Pontiac	1979
