= 1973 NASCAR Winston West Series =

20th season of the NASCAR Winston West Series

Seasons
- ← 1972 1974 →

The 1973 NASCAR Winston West Series was the 20th season of the series. The title was won by Jack McCoy, who won 11 of the season's races. It was his second title in the series, his first coming in 1966.

== Schedule and results ==
The 1973 season included 21 individual races, although Altamont Speedway and Portland Speedway hosted two races each.

| Date | Name | Racetrack | Location | Winner |
|---|---|---|---|---|
| April 29 | Altamont 100 | Altamont Speedway | Livermore, California | Ray Elder |
| May 5 | Madera 100 | Madera Speedway | Madera, California | Jack McCoy |
| May 19 | Stockton 150 | Stockton 99 Speedway | Stockton, California | Jack McCoy |
| May 26 | Mile High 150 | Century 21 Speedway | Aurora, Colorado | Bob Kauf |
| June 23 | Klamath Falls 100 | Klamath Falls Speedway | Klamath Falls, Oregon | Jack McCoy |
| June 24 | Coos Bay 100 | Coos Bay Speedway | Coos Bay, Oregon | Jack McCoy |
| June 30 | Umatilla 150 | Umatilla Speedway | Hermiston, Oregon | Jack McCoy |
| July 1 | Portland 100 | Portland Speedway | Portland, Oregon | Hershel McGriff |
| July 3 | Tacoma 150 | Spanaway Speedway | Tacoma, Washington | Ray Elder |
| July 8 | Westwood 150 | Westwood Raceway | Vancouver, British Columbia | Ray Elder |
| July 21 | Saugus 150 | Saugus Speedway | Saugus, California | Jack McCoy |
| July 28 | Cajon Tuborg 150 | Cajon Speedway | Santee, California | Dick Bown |
| August 4 | San Bernardino 100 | Orange Show Speedway | San Bernardino, California | Jack McCoy |
| August 17 | † | Clovis Speedway | Clovis, California | Ray Elder |
| August 18 | Bakersfield 100 | Bakersfield Speedway | Oildale, California | Jack McCoy |
| August 26 | Tuborg Classic 150 | Laguna Seca Raceway | Monterey, California | Sonny Easley |
| September 2 | Ranier 200 at Evergreen | Evergreen Speedway | Monroe, Washington | Jack McCoy |
| September 5 | Victoria 150 | Western Speedway | Victoria, British Columbia | Jack McCoy |
| September 8 | Yakima 100 | Yakima Speedway | Yakima, Washington | Jack McCoy |
| September 9 | Portland 200 | Portland Speedway | Portland, Oregon | Hershel McGriff |
| September 16 | Livermore-Olympia 100 | Altamount Speedway | Livermore, California | Jimmy Insolo |

† This race was not given a name

== Full Drivers' Championship ==
(key) Bold – Pole position awarded by time. Italics – Pole position set by owner's points. * – Most laps led. † – Ineligible for West Series points

| Pos | Driver | AMP | MAD | S99 | AUR | KFS | CBS | USP | POR | SPS | WER | SGS | CAJ | OSS | CSP | BKS | LAG | EVG | WSP | YAK | POR | AMP | Pts |
|---|---|---|---|---|---|---|---|---|---|---|---|---|---|---|---|---|---|---|---|---|---|---|---|
| 1 | Jack McCoy | **7** | **1*** | **1*** | 18 | **1*** | 1* | **1*** | 8* | **4*** | **12** | 1 | **19** | **1*** | 2 | **1*** | 2 | **1*** | 1* | **1*** | 4 | QL | 1673 |
| 2 | Sonny Easley | 13 | 6 | 7 | 15 | 5 | 5 | 6 | 6 | 6 | 2 | 8 | 16 | 5 | 3 | 14 | 1 | 2 | 6 | 5 | 5 | 2 | 1619 |
| 3 | Ray Elder | 1* | 5 | 2 | 7* | 3 | **3** | 4 | 20 | 1 | 1* | **10** | 7 | 2 | 1* | 3 | 22 | 13 | **2** | 2 | 21 | **7** | 1618.5 |
| 4 | Dick Bown | 2 | 11 | 3 | 11 | 2 | 6 | 2 | 9 | 2 | 3 | 2 | 1 | 3 | 9 | 2 | 24 | 14 | 3 | 4 | 15 | 8* | 1604.25 |
| 5 | Richard White | 5 | 7 | 6 | 5 | 13 | 8 | 10 | 11 | 8 | 5 | 4 | 11* | 17 | 7 | 9 | 5 | 8 | 7 | 10 | 7 | 16 | 1578.75 |
| 6 | Ron Gautsche | 6 | 14 | 9 | 8 | 9 | 9 | 11 | 14 | 10 | 6 | 5 | 10 | 13 | 8 | 11 | 10 | 15 | 10 | 16 | 19 | 11 | 1503.75 |
| 7 | Jimmy Insolo | 4 | 4 | 4 | 12 | 4 | 13 | 5 | 5 | 17 | 14 | 12* | 9 | 6 | | | 4 | 7 | 4 | 21 | 9 | 1 | 1414.25 |
| 8 | Carl Adams | 12 | 10 | | 2 | 8 | 10 | | 4 | 13 | 7 | | 6 | 11 | 5 | 5 | 9 | 11 | 11 | 8 | 2 | 6 | 1357.25 |
| 9 | Chuck Bown | 22 | 8 | 11 | 4 | 14 | 7 | 8 | 3 | 3 | 15 | 6 | 5 | 7 | 6 | 10 | 18 | 23 | 17 | | 17 | | 1272.25 |
| 10 | John Soares Jr. | 21 | | 8 | 9 | 12 | 19 | 18 | 23 | 18 | 9 | 20 | 2* | 4 | **4** | 13 | 7 | 20 | 15 | 20 | 20 | 4 | 1160 |
| 11 | George Behlman | | 20 | 17 | | | 12 | 13 | 17 | 12 | 17 | 11 | 8 | 12 | 15 | 16 | 17 | 18 | 9 | 24 | | 14 | 1010 |
| 12 | Dick Kranzler | 9 | 19 | | 16 | 19 | 18 | 12 | 12 | 15 | 8 | 17 | | 10 | 12 | 8 | 27 | 26 | 14 | 23 | 16 | 24 | 1000.5 |
| 13 | J. C. Danielsen | 16 | | 19 | 13 | 11 | 11 | | 16 | 11 | 4 | | 12 | | | | 8 | 10 | | 12 | 14 | | 929.25 |
| 14 | Markey James | 3 | 2 | 18 | | | | | | | | 3 | 13 | | | 4 | 6 | 4 | 5 | 9 | 18 | 3 | 895.25 |
| 15 | Chuck Wahl | 20 | 9 | 16 | | 10 | 15 | 17 | | | | 18 | 3 | 8 | 16 | 6 | 19 | 24 | | 15 | | 22 | 824.25 |
| 16 | Bob Kauf | 14 | 3 | DNQ | 1 | 15 | 16 | 9 | 19 | | | 7 | 4 | 9 | 10 | 7 | | | | | | | 812 |
| 17 | Ernie Stierly | | | | 3 | 7 | 4 | 7 | 2 | 9 | | | | | | | 28 | 6 | 8 | 6 | | 5 | 801 |
| 18 | Hershel McGriff | 10 | | | | | 2 | 15 | **1** | | Wth | | | | | | **3*** | Wth | | 19 | **1*** | 13 | 612 |
| 19 | Johnny Steele | 8 | 15 | 14 | 14 | 18 | | | | | | | | | 17 | 18 | | 32 | 16 | | 23 | 23 | 490.5 |
| 20 | Jerry Barnett | | 18 | 20 | | | | | | 20 | 18 | 16 | 15 | 16 | | | 13 | | | | | | 418.75 |
| 21 | Norm Ellefson | | | | | | | 3 | 22 | | | | | | | | | 3 | 13 | 13 | | 17 | 376.75 |
| 22 | Don Hall | | | | | | | 16 | 25 | 7 | | | | | | | | 21 | | 3 | 10 | | 363.75 |
| 23 | Perry Cottingham | | | | | | | | 15 | 14 | 10 | | 17 | | 18 | 12 | | | | | | | 359.25 |
| 24 | Jack Jeffery | | | | | | | 14 | 18 | | | | | | | | | 5 | | 14 | 8 | | 359 |
| 25 | Doug McGriff | | | | | | | | 10 | | | | | | | | 16 | 12 | | | 3 | | 341.25 |
| 26 | Leon Fox | | | | | | | | 21 | | 13 | | | | | | | 17 | | | 11 | 18 | 332.25 |
| 27 | Don Graham | 15 | 13 | 10 | **10** | | | | | | | | | | | | | | | | | 9 | 325.75 |
| 28 | Carl Joiner | 18 | | | | 6 | | | 7 | | | | | | | | | 31 | | 18 | 22 | | 291 |
| 29 | Ron Eaton | | | | | | | | 13 | 5 | | | | | | | | 22 | | | 6 | | 286.25 |
| 30 | Ron McKenna | 17 | | 13 | | | | | | | | 9 | 14 | | | | | | | | | | 255 |
| 31 | Bob England | 19 | 16 | 15 | | | | | | | | | | | | | | 33 | | | 24 | 20 | 242.25 |
| 32 | John Poyner | | | | | | | | | | | | | | | | | | | 7 | 13 | | 239.5 |
| 33 | Roy Smith | 24 | | | | | | | | 19 | 16 | | | | | | | 27 | | | | | 237.5 |
| 34 | Sam Beler | | | | | | | | | | | | | 18 | 11 | 15 | 26 | | | | | | 200.75 |
| 35 | Lamar Anderson | | 17 | 12 | 17 | | | | | | | | | | | | | | | | | | 173.25 |
| | Vaughn Coogan | | | | | | | | | | 11 | | | | | | | | | | | | 194.75 |
| | Nels Miller | | | | | | | | | | | | | | | | 20 | 16 | | | | | 164 |
| | Don Selley | | | | | 17 | 14 | | 24 | | | | | | | | | | | | | | 134.75 |
| | Frank Garafolo | | | | | | | | | | | 19 | 18 | 19 | 14 | | | | | | | | 124.25 |
| | Harry Jefferson | | | | | | | | Wth | | | | | | | | | 19 | | 22 | | | 100.75 |
| | Carl Lox | | | | | 16 | 17 | | | | | | | | | | | | | | | | 94.5 |
| | Jerry Kunze | 23 | 12 | | | | | | | | | | | | | | 12 | | DNQ | | | | 94.25 |
| | John Joiner | | | | | | | | | | | | | | | | | 9 | | | | | 91 |
| | Jackie Kuper | | | | | | | | | | | | | | | | | 30 | | 11 | | | 88.5 |
| | Dick Midgley | | | | 6 | | | | | | | | | | | | | | | | | | 82 |
| | Sam Stanley | | | | | | | | | | | | | | | | 21 | | | | | DNQ | 78.75 |
| | Steve Vaughn | | | | | | | | | | | 13 | | | | | DNQ | | | | | | 71 |
| | Roger Parr | | | | | | | | | | | 14 | | | | | | | | | | | 62 |
| | Johnny Anderson | | | | | | | | | | | | | 14 | | | | | | | | | 60.75 |
| | Jack Simpson | | | | | | | | | | | 15 | | | | | | | | | | DNQ | 55.5 |
| | Larry Hooper | | | | | | | | | | | | | | | | | | 12 | | | | 52 |
| | Buck Peralta | | | | | | | | | | | | | 20 | | | | | | | | | 38.5 |
| | Glenn Francis | | | | | | | | | | | | | | | 17 | | | | | | | 35.5 |
| | Bill Butts | | | | | | | | | | | | 20 | | | | | | | | | | 35.5 |
| | Butch Backmier | | | | | | | | | | | | | | | | | 28 | | | | | 35 |
| | Phil Dowler | | | | | | | | | | 19 | | | | | | | | | | | | 34.25 |
| | Odie Robertson | | | | 19 | | | | | | | | | | | | | | | | | | 31.25 |
| | Willie McNeal | | | | | | 20 | | | | | | | | | | | | | | | | 31.25 |
| | Frank Ayling | | | | | | | | | | | | | | | | | 29 | | | | | 28.25 |
| | Harry Schilling | | | | | | | | | | | | | | | | 30 | | | | | | 21.75 |
| | Paul Dorrity | 11 | | 5 | | | | | | | | | | | | | | | | | | | |
| | Ron Coogan | | | | | | | | | | | | | | | | | 25 | | 17 | | | |
| | Harold Hardesty | | | | | | | | | | | | | | | | | | | | | 10 | |
| | Pete Torres | | | | | | | | | | | | | | | | 11 | | | | | | |
| | Frank Burnett | | | | | | | | | | | | | | | | | | | | | 12 | |
| | Larry Bell | | | | | | | | | | | | | | | | | | | | 12 | | |
| | Les Loeser Jr. | | | | | | | | | | | | | | 13 | | | | | | | DNQ | |
| | Vic Irvan | | | | | | | | | | | | | | | | 14 | | | | | | |
| | Bruce Blodgett | | | | | | | | | | | | | | | | DNQ | | | | | 15 | |
| | Jim Lee Phillips | | | | | | | | | | | | | 15 | | | | | | | | | |
| | Ray Schriever | | | | | | | | | | | | | | | | 15 | | | | | | |
| | Kemp Brock | | | | | | | | | 16 | | | | | | | | | | | | | |
| | Don Noel | | | | | | | | | | | | | | | | | | | | | 19 | |
| | Jim McMillan | | | | | | | | | | 20 | | | | | | | | | | | | |
| | Glen McCoy | | | | | | | | | | | | | | | | | | | | | 21 | |
| | Robert Dunn | | | | | | | | | | | | | | | | 23 | | | | | | |
| | Eddie Bradshaw | | | | | | | | | | | | | | | | 25 | | | | | | |
| | Jim Benison | | | | | | | | | | | | | | | | 29 | | | | | | |
| | Sam Hall | | | | | | | | | | | | | | | | DNQ | | | | | | |
| | Ed Moss | | | | | | | | | | | | | | | | DNQ | | | | | | |
| | Steve Pfeifer | | | | | | | | | | | | | | | | DNQ | | | | | | |
| | Clem Proctor | | | | | | | | | | | | | | | | DNQ | | | | | | |
| | Steve Froines | | | | | | | | | | | | | | | | DNQ | | | | | | |
| | Norm Palmer | | | | | | | | | | | | | | | | DNQ | | | | | | |
| | Bob Kennedy | | | | | | | | | | | | | | | | DNQ | | | | | | |
| | Doug Odom | | | | | | | | | | | | | | | | | | | | | DNQ | |

== See also ==
- 1973 NASCAR Winston Cup Series
