= 1971 Miller High Life 500 =

Auto race held at Ontario Motor Speedway in 1971

Race details
- Race 5 of 48 in the 1971 NASCAR Winston Cup Series season
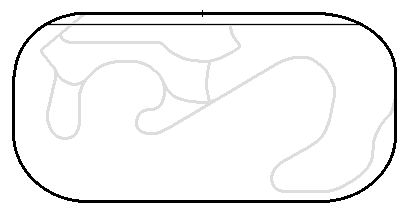
- Date: February 28, 1971
- Official name: Miller High Life 500
- Location: Ontario Motor Speedway, Ontario, California
- Course: Permanent racing facility
- Course length: 2.500 miles (4.023 km)
- Distance: 200 laps, 500 mi (804 km)
- Weather: Cold with temperatures of 60.1 °F (15.6 °C); wind speeds of 12 miles per hour (19 km/h)
- Average speed: 134.168 miles per hour (215.922 km/h)
- Attendance: 78,810

Pole position
Driver	A. J. Foyt	Wood Brothers Racing
- Time: 118.646 seconds

Most laps led
Driver	A.J. Foyt	Wood Brothers Racing
- Laps: 118

Winner
No. 21	A.J. Foyt	Wood Brothers Racing

Television in the United States
- Network: ABC
- Announcers: Jim McKay; Jackie Stewart

The 1971 Miller High Life 500 was a NASCAR Winston Cup Series event that took place at Ontario Motor Speedway in Ontario, California.

== Race report ==
Two hundred laps were raced on the paved oval track spanning 2.500 miles (4.023 km). The total time of the race was three hours, forty-three minutes, and thirty-six seconds. Held on February 28, 1971, this would be the first stock car event to take place at Ontario Motor Speedway. The only Cup race with a driver from Utah entered. Art Pollard was a DNQ and the sole Utahan to enter a national level NASCAR race until Michael Self's Xfinity starts 44 years later.

The average speed was 134.168 miles per hour (215.922 km/h) and the pole position speed was 151.711 miles per hour (244.155 km/h). There were five cautions for 21 laps and the margin of victory was 8½ seconds. With an attendance of nearly seventy-nine thousand people. Notable crew chiefs at this event included Paul Goldsmith, Richard Elder, Harry Hyde, Dale Inman, Lee Gordon and Paul Burchard.

In the 51-car racing grid, there were 50 Americans and one Mexican, Pedro Rodríguez who finished in 47th due to an electrical fault. It was the 1000th race in NASCAR history. It would be Rodríguez' final NASCAR Winston Cup Series start. Dean Dalton would finish in last place due to being black flagged and disqualified on lap 2. The only car in the same league with Foyt was Fred Lorenzen until Lorenzen's engine blew and he crashed on the front straight with a fire. At the end, Petty had a chance to win, but he missed his pit under the green flag and had to come back in and finished third. Foyt won the first two Ontario races.

The total winnings of the race were $180,200 ($1,432,567.79 when adjusted for inflation) - making it the biggest non-Daytona purse during that era. Manufacturers involved in the event included Chevrolet, Ford, Dodge, Mercury, and Plymouth. Other notable drivers included Elmo Langley, Fred Lorenzen, and Ron Hornaday, Sr. (whose son is a four-time Craftsman Truck Series champion). Marty Kinerk, Jim McElreath, and Johnny Steele all made what would be their final starts in NASCAR's top series.

=== Qualifying ===
Grid	No.	Driver	Manufacturer	Speed	Qualifying time	Owner
1	21	A. J. Foyt	'69 Mercury	151.711	1:58.646	Wood Brothers
2	71	Bobby Isaac	'71 Dodge	150.097	1:59.922	Nord Krauskopf
3	43	Richard Petty	'71 Plymouth	149.630	2:00.297	Petty Enterprises
4	6	Pete Hamilton	'71 Plymouth	149.256	2:00.598	Cotton Owens
5	99	Fred Lorenzen	'71 Plymouth	149.048	2:00.766	Ray Nichels
6	11	Buddy Baker	'71 Dodge	146.792	2:02.622	Petty Enterprises
7	96	Ray Elder	'70 Dodge	146.443	2:02.915	Fred Elder
8	72	Benny Parsons	'69 Mercury	145.645	2:03.588	L.G. DeWitt
9	39	Friday Hassler	'69 Dodge	144.142	2:04.877	Friday Hassler
10	55	Tiny Lund	'69 Mercury	143.712	2:05.250	John McConnell

Failed to qualify: Jack Roberts (#20), John W. Anderson (#57), Ben Arnold (#76), Sam Rose (#09), Walter Ballard (#30), Jerry Barnett (#55), D.K. Ulrich (#40), Earle Wagner (#01), Art Pollard (#94), Harold Pagon (#36), Larry Baumel (#68), Leonard Blanchard (#95), Frank Burnett (#43W), Scotty Cain (#1), Neil Castles (#06), Markey James (#31), Vic Irvan (#5), Paul Tyler (#95), Tru Cheek (#62), Marion Collins (#78), Chris Connery (#11W), Jim Danielson (#64W), Jack DeWitt (#17W), Paul Dorrity (#15), Vallie Engelauf (#65), Doc Faustina (#5), Glenn Francis (#33), Les Loeser (#40W), Ed Negre (#8), Bill Champion (#10)

== Finishing order ==
Section reference:

1. A. J. Foyt
2. Buddy Baker
3. Richard Petty
4. Bobby Isaac
5. Dick Brooks
6. LeeRoy Yarbrough
7. Ray Elder
8. Tiny Lund
9. Benny Parsons
10. James Hylton
11. Elmo Langley
12. Marv Acton
13. Jack McCoy
14. Bill Seifert
15. Carl Joiner
16. Friday Hassler
17. Jimmy Insolo
18. Jabe Thomas
19. Cecil Gordon
20. Bobby Wawak
21. Frank James
22. Ron Hornaday
23. Earl Brooks
24. Dick Guldstrand
25. Harry Schilling
26. Ivan Baldwin
27. Dick Bown
28. Hershel McGriff
29. Henley Gray
30. Fred Lorenzen
31. Pete Hamilton
32. Pat Fay
33. Ray Johnstone
34. Marty Kinerk
35. J. D. McDuffie
36. Jim McElreath
37. Johnny Steele
38. John Soares Jr.
39. Bobby Allison
40. Red Farmer
41. Bob England
42. Kevin Terris
43. Bill Champion
44. Don Noel
45. G.T. Tallas
46. Bill Osborne
47. Pedro Rodríguez
48. Dick Kranzler
49. Ron Gautsche
50. Frank Warren
51. Dean Dalton

Preceded by 1971 Daytona 500	NASCAR Winston Cup Season; 1971	Succeeded by 1971 Richmond 500

Preceded by none	Miller High Life 500 races 1971	Succeeded by 1972
