= 1971 NASCAR Winston West Series =

18th season of the NASCAR Winston West Series

Seasons
- ← 1970 1972 →

The 1971 NASCAR Winston West Series was the 18th season of the series. The title was won by Ray Elder, his third in succession.

== Schedule and results ==
The 1971 season included 26 individual races, although Riverside International Raceway, Orange Show Speedway, and Craig Road Speedway hosted two races each. The races at Riverside, the race at Ontario Motor Speedway, and the race at Texas World Speedway were in combination with the NASCAR Winston Cup Series.

| Date | Name | Racetrack | Location | Winner |
|---|---|---|---|---|
| January 10 | Motor Trend 500 | Riverside International Raceway | Riverside, California | Ray Elder |
| February 28 | Miller High Life 500 | Ontario Motor Speedway | Ontario, California | A. J. Foyt |
| March 7 | Orange 400 | Orange Show Speedway | San Bernardino, California | Jack McCoy |
| March 21 | † | San Jose Speedway | San Jose, California | John Soares, Jr. |
| May 9 | Vegas 150 | Craig Road Speedway | North Las Vegas, Nevada | Jimmy Insolo |
| May 15 | Stockton 150 | Stockton 99 Speedway | Stockton, California | Jack McCoy |
| June 5 | Ascot 200 | Ascot Park | Gardena, California | Ray Elder |
| June 20 | Winston Golden State 400 | Riverside International Raceway | Riverside, California | Bobby Allison |
| June 26 | Salem Mighty Mite 100 | Salem Speedway | Salem, Oregon | Hershel McGriff |
| July 2 | Spanaway 150 | Spanaway Speedway | Tacoma, Washington | Jack McCoy |
| July 4 | Apple State 150 | Skagit Speedway | Mount Vernon, Washington | Hershel McGriff |
| July 10 | Umatilla 100 | Umatilla Speedway | Hermiston, Oregon | Ray Elder |
| July 11 | Rose City 100 | Portland Speedway | Portland, Oregon | Hershel McGriff |
| July 13 | Royal Canadian 150 | Langley Speedway | Langley, British Columbia | Hershel McGriff |
| July 16 | Medford 100 | Medford Speedway | Medford, Oregon | Carl Joiner |
| July 17 | Roseburg Northwest 100 | Douglas County Speedway | Roseburg, Oregon | Hershel McGriff |
| July 30 | Las Vegas Lucky 21 150 | Craig Road Speedway | North Las Vegas, Nevada | Ray Elder |
| July 31 | Orange Show 150 | Orange Show Speedway | San Bernardino, California | Johnny Anderson |
| August 7 | Saugus 150 | Saugus Speedway | Santa Clarita, California | Ray Elder |
| August 8 | Bakersfield 150 | Bakersfield Speedway | Oildale, California | Ray Elder |
| August 20 | Clovis Vineyard 100 | Clovis Speedway | Clovis, California | Ray Elder |
| September 6 | Evergreen 200 | Evergreen Speedway | Monroe, Washington | Ray Elder |
| September 8 | Spokane 100 | Interstate Fairground Speedway | Spokane, Washington | Hershel McGriff |
| September 11 | Yakima 150 | Yakima Speedway | Yakima, Washington | Ray Elder |
| October 31 | San Gabriel Valley 100 | San Gabriel Valley Speedway | Irwindale, California | Jack McCoy |
| December 12 | Texas 500 | Texas World Speedway | College Station, Texas | Richard Petty |

† This race was not given a name.

== Full Drivers' Championship ==
(key) Bold – Pole position awarded by time. Italics – Pole position set by owner's points. * – Most laps led. † – Ineligible for West Series points

| Pos | Driver | RSD | ONT | OSS | SJS | CRS | S99 | ASP | RSD | SAL | SPS | SKA | USP | POR | LSP | MED | DCS | CRS | OSS | SGS | BKS | CSP | EVG | IFS | YAK | SGB | TWS | Pts |
|---|---|---|---|---|---|---|---|---|---|---|---|---|---|---|---|---|---|---|---|---|---|---|---|---|---|---|---|---|
| 1 | Ray Elder | 1* | 7 | 2 | **3** | 2 | 2 | **1*** | 2 | **3** | 20 | **2** | 1 | 2 | **2** | 2 | 2* | 1* | **3** | **1*** | **1*** | 1* | **1*** | **21** | **1*** | 21 | 46 | 1471 |
| 2 | Jack McCoy | 18 | 13 | **1*** | 2 | **15** | 1* | 2 | 11 | 4 | **1*** | 7 | 4 | 4 | 3 | 10 | 19 | **2** | 15 | 15 | 11 | 15 | 10 | 4 | 5 | **1*** | | 1304 |
| 3 | Jimmy Insolo | 25 | 17 | 8 | 4 | 1 | 9 | 3 | 17 | 5 | 2 | 4 | **3*** | 16 | 4 | 8 | 10 | 3 | 7 | 3 | 4 | 8 | 20 | 6 | 7 | 5 | | 1264 |
| 4 | Bob England | 13 | 41 | 6 | 5 | 7 | 10 | 8 | 12 | 14 | 17 | 12 | 11 | 15 | 12 | 9 | 12 | 16 | 6 | 11 | 8 | 7 | 5 | 9 | 13 | 12 | 29 | 1224 |
| 5 | John Soares Jr. | 21 | 38 | | 1* | | **13** | | 6 | 9 | 3 | 10 | 10 | 22 | 5 | 4 | 9 | 6 | 4 | 14 | 10 | 12 | 3 | 3 | 10 | 18 | | 1067 |
| 6 | Dick Kranzler | 14 | 48 | | 6 | 18 | 3 | 11 | 23 | 8 | 22 | 11 | 15 | 7 | 13 | 18 | 18 | 7 | DNQ | 17 | 5 | 16 | 8 | 7 | 19 | 7 | | 988 |
| 7 | Bob Kauf | 27 | | | 18 | 4 | 12 | 14 | 37 | 10 | 13 | 18 | 16 | 12 | 10 | 15 | 14 | 17 | 20 | 8 | 19 | 5 | 7 | 15 | 8 | 22 | | 908 |
| 8 | Jerry Barnett | | DNQ | 18 | 14 | | 5 | 17 | 30 | 16 | 15 | 16 | 9 | 6 | 9 | 14 | 6 | 12 | 13 | 2 | 12 | 6 | 14 | 14 | 18 | 4 | 37 | 903 |
| 9 | Hershel McGriff | 12 | 28 | | | | | | 21 | 1* | 5 | 1* | 2 | **1*** | 1* | 5 | **1** | | | | | **2** | 11 | 1* | 14 | | | 843 |
| 10 | Frank James | 22 | 21 | | | 3 | | 7 | 10 | 7 | 14 | 8 | 8 | 17 | 6 | 7 | 5 | | | | 3 | 20 | | | | | | 807 |
| 11 | Carl Joiner | 8 | 15 | 17 | | | | | 31 | 6 | 19 | | 5 | 11 | | **1*** | 3 | | | | | | 2 | 12 | 2 | 3 | | 743 |
| 12 | Ron Gautsche | 19 | 49 | | 21 | | 7 | | 25 | 12 | 7 | 17 | 17 | 21 | | | | 15 | 17 | | 18 | 10 | 25 | 8 | 9 | | | 690 |
| 13 | Dick Bown | 16 | 27 | 10 | 17 | 12 | 20 | | 39 | 2 | 18 | 3 | 6 | 19 | | | | | | | | | 17 | 19 | | | | 631 |
| 14 | Don Noel | 33 | 44 | | | | | | 15 | | 4 | 14 | 13 | 5 | 11 | 3 | 15 | 10 | | 7 | | | | | | | | 560 |
| 15 | Tru Cheek | | DNQ | 12 | 8 | 11 | | 13 | 24 | | | | | | | | | | | 13 | 13 | 9 | 13 | 20 | 11 | 6 | | 513 |
| 16 | Scotty Cain | | DNQ | | | | | | 8 | | 10 | 6 | 19 | 10 | | | | 9 | QL | | | 4 | 6 | 16 | 16 | 8 | | 503 |
| 17 | Paul Dorrity | 28 | DNQ | | 9 | | 18 | 5 | 33 | | | | | | | | | 4 | 2 | 16 | 2 | 3 | | | | | | 472 |
| 18 | Chuck Bown | | | | | | | | | 13 | 9 | 20 | 7 | 3 | 7 | 19 | 4 | | | | | | 18 | 2 | 3 | | | 456 |
| 19 | Johnny Anderson | | | | | | | | 29 | | | | | | | | | 14 | 1* | 4 | 17 | 13 | 4 | 5 | 17 | 2 | | 448 |
| 20 | Pete Torres | | | 11 | 11 | 14 | | 16 | 34 | | 21 | 13 | | | | 20 | 11 | | | 18 | | | 15 | | 22 | 17 | | 445 |
| 21 | Markey James | | DNQ | | | | | 12 | 40 | | | | | | | | | 5 | 5 | 12 | 7 | | 23 | | 4 | 9 | | 424 |
| 22 | Johnny Steele | | 37 | 3 | 22 | 19 | 8 | 4 | | 11 | 11 | | 18 | 20 | | | | | | | | | | | | | | 385 |
| 23 | Glenn Francis | 34 | DNQ | 5 | 12 | 13 | 14 | 21 | | | | | | | | | | | 11 | 6 | 14 | 11 | | | | | | 373 |
| 24 | Pat Fay | 40 | 32 | | | 5 | 4 | | 9 | | | | | | | | | | | 19 | | | 22 | | | | | 370 |
| 25 | Kevin Terris | 7 | 42 | | | | | 19 | 7 | | | | | | | | | | | | | 14 | | | | | | 360 |
| 26 | Ed Brown | | | | | | | | | 18 | 8 | 9 | | 9 | | 6 | 8 | | | | | | 9 | 18 | 15 | | | 359 |
| 27 | Ernie Stierly | | | | | | | | | 15 | 6 | | 12 | 13 | | 12 | 13 | | | | | | | 13 | 6 | | | 318 |
| 28 | J. C. Danielsen | | DNQ | | 15 | 9 | 17 | | | | | | | | | | | | | 10 | 9 | | 12 | 11 | 12 | | | 313 |
| 29 | Ivan Baldwin | 39 | 26 | 4 | | | | | 16 | | | | | | | | | | 9 | | | | | | | | | 305 |
| 30 | Harry Schilling | 37 | 25 | | | | | | 32 | | | | | | | | | | | | | | 16 | 10 | 20 | | | 284 |
| 31 | Ray Johnstone | 32 | 33 | 15 | | 16* | | | 20 | | | | | | | | | | 8 | | | | | | | | | 261 |
| 32 | Jack Roberts | | DNQ | 16 | | | | | | | | | | | | | | 13 | 12 | 5 | 16 | 19 | | | | 23 | | 253 |
| 33 | Jerry Oliver | 29 | | | | | 6 | | 5 | | | | | | | | | | | | | | | | | | | 249 |
| 34 | Les Loeser Jr. | | DNQ | | 19 | | | 9 | | | | | | | | | | | 10 | 9 | 6 | 18 | | | | | | 235 |
| 35 | Vic Irvan | | DNQ | | 13 | | 19 | | | 17 | | | | | | 17 | 17 | | | | | | | | | 14 | | 209 |
| | Dick Guldstrand | 24 | 24 | | | | | | | | | | | | | | | | | | | | | | | | | 192 |
| | John Lyons | | | | | 6 | 11 | 15 | 28 | | | | | | | | | | | | | | | | | | | 190 |
| | L. T. Jones | | | 13 | | 10 | 15 | 10 | | | | | | | | | | | | | | | | | | | | 156 |
| | Ron Cooper | | | | | | | | | | | 19 | 14 | 18 | 8 | | | | | | | | | | | | | 145 |
| | Dick Westman | | | | | | | | | 19 | | | | 14 | | 16 | 16 | | | | | | 21 | | | | | 139 |
| | Bill Osborne | | 46 | | | | | | 26 | | | | | | | | | | 18 | | | | | | | | | 123 |
| | Ron Grable | 23 | | | | | | | | | | | | | | | | | | | | | | | | | | 114 |
| | Mike Pittlekow | 31 | | | | | | | | | | | | | | | | | | | | | | | | | | 96 |
| | Joe Clark | 36 | | | | | | | | | | | | | | | | | | | | | | | | | | 84 |
| | Larry Bell | | | | | | | | | | | | | | | 13 | 7 | | | | | | | | | | | 82 |
| | Buck Peralta | | | 9 | | | | | | | | | | | | | | | 14 | | | | | | | | | 79 |
| | Roy Collins | 38 | | | | | | | | | | | | | | | | | | | | | | | | | | 78 |
| | Sam Rose | | DNQ | | | | | | | | | | | 8 | 14 | | | | | | | | | 17 | 21 | | | 77 |
| | Ken Shoemaker | | | | | 17 | | | | | | | | | | | | 11 | | | | | | | | | | 74 |
| | Bruce Kratt | | | | | | | | | | | | | | | | | | 19 | | 15 | | | | | | | 68 |
| | Dwayne Belt | | | | | | | | | | | 15 | | | | | 20 | | | | | | | | | | | 67 |
| | Bill Lee | | | | | | | | | | 16 | 21 | | | | | | | | | | | | | | | | 65 |
| | Bob Clough | | | | | | | 18 | | | | | | | | | | | | | | 21 | | | | | | 63 |
| | J. R. Skinner | | | | | | | | 35 | | | | | | | | | | | | | | | | | | | 48 |
| | Fred Hay | | | | | | | | | | | 5 | | | | | | | | | | | 24 | | | | | 46 |
| | Jack DeWitt | | DNQ | | | | | 6 | | | | | | | | | | | | | | | | | | | | 45 |
| | G. T. Tallas | 11 | 45 | 7 | | | | | | | | | | | | | | | | | | | | | | | | 44 |
| | Sam Fairchild | | | | | | | | | | | | | | | | | 8 | | | | | | | | 20 | | 43 |
| | Bill O'Neil | | | | | | | | | | | | | | | 11 | | | | | | | | | | | | 40 |
| | Doug McGriff | | | | | | | | | | 12 | | | | | | | | | | | | | | | | | 39 |
| | Wilbur Pratt | | | 14 | | | | | | | | | | | | | | | | | | | | | | | | 37 |
| | Roger Parr | | | | | 8 | | 20 | | | | | | | | | | | 16 | | | | | | | | | 35 |
| | Joe Roletto | | | | 10 | | 16 | | | | | | | | | | | | | | | | | | | | | 35 |
| | Frank Burnett | | DNQ | | | | | | | | | | | | | | | | | | | 17 | | | | 11 | | 34 |
| | Marty Kinerk | | 34 | | 20 | | | | | | | | | | | | | | | | | | | | | | | |
| | Ed Wilbur | | | | 7 | | | | | | | | | | | | | | | | | | | | | | | |
| | Cliff Vose | | | | | | | | | | | | | | | | | | | | | | | | | 10 | | |
| | Don Simkins | | | | | | | | | | | | | | | | | | | | | | | | | 13 | | |
| | Chuck Hetrick | | | | | | | | | | | | | | | | | | | | | | | | | 15 | | |
| | Tom Patton | | | | | | | | | | | | | | | | | | | | | | | | | 16 | | |
| | Bill Scott | | | | 16 | | | | | | | | | | | | | | | | | | | | | | | |
| | Frank Jones | | | 19 | | | | | | | | | | | | | | | | | | | | | | | | |
| | Sig Nelson | | | | | | | | | | | | | | | | | | | | | | | | | 19 | | |
| | Arlyn Wolanski | | | | | | | | | | | | | | | | | | | | | | 19 | | | | | |
| | Ron Hornaday | | 22 | | | | | | | | | | | | | | | | | | | | | | | | | |
| | Marion Collins | | DNQ | | | | | | | | | | | | | | | | | | | | | | | 24 | | |
| | Chris Connery | | DNQ | DNQ | | | | | | | | | | | | | | | | | | | | | | | | |
| | John W. Anderson | | DNQ | | | | | | | | | | | | | | | | | | | | | | | | | |
| | Ben Arnold | | DNQ | | | | | | | | | | | | | | | | | | | | | | | | | |
| | Walter Ballard | | DNQ | | | | | | | | | | | | | | | | | | | | | | | | | |
| | D. K. Ulrich | | DNQ | | | | | | | | | | | | | | | | | | | | | | | | | |
| | Earle Wagner | | DNQ | | | | | | | | | | | | | | | | | | | | | | | | | |
| | Art Pollard | | DNQ | | | | | | | | | | | | | | | | | | | | | | | | | |
| | Harold Pagon | | DNQ | | | | | | | | | | | | | | | | | | | | | | | | | |
| | Larry Baumel | | DNQ | | | | | | | | | | | | | | | | | | | | | | | | | |
| | Leonard Blanchard | | DNQ | | | | | | | | | | | | | | | | | | | | | | | | | |
| | Neil Castles | | DNQ | | | | | | | | | | | | | | | | | | | | | | | | | |
| | Paul Tyler | | DNQ | | | | | | | | | | | | | | | | | | | | | | | | | |
| | Vallie Engelauf | | DNQ | | | | | | | | | | | | | | | | | | | | | | | | | |
| | Doc Faustina | | DNQ | | | | | | | | | | | | | | | | | | | | | | | | | |
| | Ed Negre | | DNQ | | | | | | | | | | | | | | | | | | | | | | | | | |
| | Bill Champion | | DNQ | | | | | | | | | | | | | | | | | | | | | | | | | |
| | Robert Banuelos | | | | | | | | | | | | | | | | | | DNQ | | | | | | | | | |
| | Oren Prosser | | | | | | | | | | | | | | | | | | | DNQ | | | | | | | | |
| | Clay Priola | | | | | | | | | | | | | | | | | | | DNQ | | | | | | | | |
| | Charles Hindman | | | | | | | | | | | | | | | | | | Wth | | | | | | | | | |

== See also ==
- 1971 NASCAR Winston Cup Series
