= 1965 NASCAR Pacific Coast Late Model Division =

12th season of the NASCAR Pacific Coast Late Model Division

Seasons
- ← 1964 1966 →

The 1965 NASCAR Pacific Coast Late Model Division was the 12th season of the series. The title was won by Bill Amick, his first in the series.

== Schedule and results ==
The 1965 season included 14 individual races, although Ascot Park hosted five races, Portland Speedway hosted three races, and Champion Speedway hosted two races. The first race of the season was held in 1964. The race at Riverside International Raceway was in combination with the NASCAR Grand National Series.

Date	Name	Racetrack	Location	Winner
November 15, 1964	†	Champion Speedway	Brisbane, California	Ron Hornaday
January 17	Motor Trend 500	Riverside International Raceway	Riverside, California	Dan Gurney
March 14	San Jose 200	San Jose Speedway	San Jose, California	Bill Amick
March 27	Ascot 200	Ascot Park	Gardena, California	Marvin Porter
April 4	†	Portland Speedway	Portland, Oregon	Bill Amick
April 25	Evergreen 100	Evergreen Speedway	Monroe, Washington	Bill Amick
May 2	Champion Speedway 100	Champion Speedway	Brisbane, California	Marvin Porter
May 16	Portland 150	Portland Speedway	Portland, Oregon	Bill Amick
May 30	Ascot 500	Ascot Park	Gardena, California	Bill Amick
June 27	†	Portland Speedway	Portland, Oregon	Bill Amick
July 4	Ascot 200	Ascot Park	Gardena, California	Clem Proctor
September 5	†	Ascot Park	Gardena, California	Bill Amick
October 3	California 100	California State Fairgrounds Race Track	Sacramento, California	Bill Amick
November 7	†	Ascot Park	Gardena, California	Marvin Porter

† This race was not given a name

== Full Drivers' Championship ==
(key) Bold – Pole position awarded by time. Italics – Pole position set by owner's points. * – Most laps led. † – Finishing position unknown
Note: only the final points of the top 20 were recorded. Due to missing information, some drivers and finishes may not be included and some finishes marked as not running may not be accurate - their final status is not definitively known.

Pos	Driver	BRS	RSD	SJS	ASP	POR	EVG	BRS	POR	ASP	POR	ASP	ASP	CSF	ASP	Pts
1	Bill Amick	7	18	1*	19	**1***	**1***	9*	1*	1	**1***	**3**	1*	**1***	0†	3036
2	Marvin Porter	2		14	**1***	4	4	1	16	2		7	2	2	1	3030
3	Johnny Steele	4	37	5	5	11	7	13	13		5	4		4	5	2894
4	Jack McCoy	13		**7**	14	9	12	10	7	4	11	2	3	21	2	2480
5	Ed Brown	5	14	11	7	10		3	11		6		0†	13	0†	2316
6	Dave James	10		4	9	7	8	5	6			0†	0†	5	0†	2112
7	Cliff Garner			17	2	15	10	2	4	0†			4	15	3	1898
8	Scotty Cain	6	7	2	24	8		8		0†	7			8	0†	1854
9	Carl Joiner	14		12		5	5	**4**	9		3			3	0†	1732
10	Ron Hornaday	**1***								**3**		6	0†	12	0†	1642
11	Lloyd Dane	3			3					0†			**0**†	25		1624
12	Dick Bown	9	27	8		2	3		15		2			14		1288
13	Eddie Gray		6	3	6	16	16	16		5				23		1204
14	Sam Stanley		8	13	15	DNQ	18		5	0†		5				1136
15	Jim Cook		33	15	20								0†	6	4	1068
16	Clem Proctor				4							1*	5		**0**†	1050
17	Walt Price				26								0†	11	0†	970
18	Bill Ferrier				11										9	878
19	Bob McDonald			6	28											868
20	Don Walker		38			12	15		10		8			9		768
	Jim Marine					13	13		14		10			22	8	
	Kuzie Kuzmanich					14	2		**2**		4					
	Hershel McGriff					3	14		3					19		
	Paul Stienke					17	11		8		9					
	Bruce Worrell	11	41		22			6								
	Danny Graves					6	6		12							
	Jim Smith				13			14		0†						
	Marshall Sargent							11						18	0†	
	Carl Ciendrichs												0†	24	6	
	Gene Davis		5		25			12								
	Joe Clark	12	30		12											
	Bob Perry		43		10									16		
	Clyde Prickett													7	10	
	George Durade													17	0†	
	Larry Bell	8						15								
	Joe Rushton			16										10		
	Don Noel				27					0†						
	Billy Foster			18	18											
	Oren Prosser				23									20		
	Bob Thompson		34		16											
	Bill Boldt		35		21											
	Bill Cantrell												0†			
	Bing Warner												0†			
	Dan Gurney		1*													
	Junior Johnson		**2**													
	Marvin Panch		3													
	Darel Dieringer		4													
	Jim Blomgren														7	
	Joe Roletto							7								
	Jon Ward				8											
	Jim Miller			9												
	Buck Baker		9													
	Johnny Smythe						9									
	Frank Burnett			10												
	A. J. Foyt		10													
	Jerry Grant		11													
	Roy Tyner		12													
	Nat Reeder		13													
	Dick Guldstrand		15													
	Bob Connor		16													
	Sam McQuagg		17													
	Dick Brooks						17									
	Jimmy Caruthers				17											
	Ernie Stierly								17							
	Ned Jarrett		19													
	Skip Hudson		20													
	Fritz Wilson		21													
	Doug Cooper		22													
	Larry Frank		23													
	Fred Lorenzen		24													
	Doug Moore		25													
	Frank Deiny													26		
	Al Self		26													
	Bob Bondurant		28													
	Bobby Allison		29													
	Dick Hutcherson		31													
	Parnelli Jones		32													
	Bill Meyer		36													
	Billy Cantrell		39													
	Charles Powell		40													
	Dana Hall		42													

== See also ==
- 1965 NASCAR Grand National Series
