= Kuzie Kuzmanich =

American racing driver (1927–2016)

- Born: Marine John Kuzmanich; January 28, 1927; Portland, Oregon, U.S.
- Died: March 19, 2016 (aged 89); Portland, Oregon, U.S.

NASCAR Cup Series career
- 3 races run over 2 years
- Best finish: 106th (1960)
- First race: 1960 California 250 (Hanford)
- Last race: 1961 Race 45 (Sacramento)
Wins	Top tens	Poles
0	2	0

ARCA Menards Series West career
- 28 races run over 7 years
- Best finish: 7th (1964)
- First race: 1960 California 250 (Hanford)
- Last race: 1968 Race 9 (Evergreen)
- First win: 1966 Race 6 (Portland)
Wins	Top tens	Poles
1	22	4
- Statistics up to date as of October 20, 2026.

Marine John "Kuzie" Kuzmanich (January 28, 1927 – March 19, 2016) was an American professional stock car racing driver. He competed in NASCAR in the 1960s.

== Racing career ==
Kuzmanich and his best friend Don Collins built their first stock car while in high school. He ran his first race with a forged ID under the name Fred Jackson due to being underage to compete. In the 1940s and 1950s, Kuzmanich ran local events at Jantzen Beach Arena and Portland Speedway. He won a late model championship in 1958 and picked up sponsorship from Bud Meadows Pontiac. He finished third in the standings in 1960 and second in 1961 after switching to a smaller model of car. Kuzmanich won O.A.R.A. championships at Portland in 1962 and 1963.

Kuzmanich simultaneously made his NASCAR Grand National Series and NASCAR Pacific Coast Late Model Division debut in a combination race at Marchbanks Speedway in 1960, finishing 30th; he also made a start at the California State Fairgrounds Race Track, finishing sixth. He ran one combination race in 1961, finishing eighth in his third and final Grand National start.

Kuzmanich returned to the Pacific Coast Late Model Division in 1964, running at least thirteen races with three poles and ten top-tens and a best finish of second at Portland. He finished seventh in the standings. He made at least four starts in 1965, scoring a pole at Portland and second-place finishes at Evergreen Speedway and Portland. He made his only recorded USAC Stock Car Series start at Marchbanks in 1965, finishing sixth. Kuzmanich made two Pacific Coast Late Model starts in 1966, finishing sixth at Douglas County Speedway and scoring his first and only career win at Portland. He made three starts in 1967, crashing out of two races and finishing fourth at Portland. Kuzmanich ran his final races in the series in 1968, scoring two top-tens with a best result of fifth at Portland.

== Personal life ==
Kuzmanich was born in Portland, Oregon to Matt and Elise Kuzmanich. He graduated from Benson High School and shortly after enlisted in the United States Coast Guard, where he served as a merchant marine during World War II until his honorable discharge in August 1945. He met and married Mary Lexa in 1948, and they had two children, Nancy and Joseph; Kuzie and Mary divorced in 1991. He enjoyed yearly trips to Puerto Vallarta, Mexico during the winter, where he had many friends.

== Death ==
Kuzmanich died of natural causes on March 19, 2016, at the age of 89.

== Motorsports career results ==
=== NASCAR ===
(key) (Bold – Pole position awarded by qualifying time. Italics – Pole position earned by points standings or practice time. * – Most laps led.)

==== Grand National Series ====
NASCAR Grand National Series results
Year	Team	No.	Make	1	2	3	4	5	6	7	8	9	10	11	12	13	14	15	16	17	18	19	20	21	22	23	24	25	26	27	28	29	30	31	32	33	34	35	36	37	38	39	40	41	42	43	44	45	46	47	48	49	50	51	52	NGNSC	Pts	Ref
1960	Walt Palozi	28N	Pontiac	CLT	CLB	DAY	DAY	DAY	CLT	NWS	PHO	CLB	MAR	HCY	WIL	BGS	GPS	AWS	DAR	PIF	HBO	RCH	HMS; 30	CLT	BGS	DAY	HEI	MAB	MBS	ATL	BIR	NSV	AWS	PIF	CLB	SBO	BGS	DAR	HCY	CSF; 6	GSP	HBO	MAR	NWS	CLT	RCH	ATL									106th	224	
1961	Walt Palozi	28	Pontiac	CLT	JSP	DAY	DAY	DAY	PIF	AWS	HMS	ATL	GPS	HBO	BGS	MAR	NWS	CLB	HCY	RCH	MAR	DAR	CLT	CLT	RSD	ASP	CLT	PIF	BIR	GPS	BGS	NOR	HAS	STR	DAY	ATL	CLB	MBS	BRI	NSV	BGS	AWS	RCH	SBO	DAR	HCY	RCH	CSF; 8	ATL	MAR	NWS	CLT	BRI	GPS	HBO	NA	NA	

==== Pacific Coast Late Model Division ====
NASCAR Pacific Coast Late Model Division results
Year	Team	No.	Make	1	2	3	4	5	6	7	8	9	10	11	12	13	14	15	16	17	18	19	20	21	22	23	24	25	26	27	28	29	NPCLMDC	Pts	Ref
1960	Walt Palozie	28N	Pontiac	ASP	ASP	ASF	ASP	HMS; 30	ASP	BAL	RSD	KEA	BKS	ASP	CSF; 6	RSD	ASP	BAL	ASP														NA	NA	
1961	Walt Palozie	28	Pontiac	ASP	HMS	KEA	ASP	RSD	ASP	ASP	ANS	ATS	BON	ASP	CSF; 8	ANS	ASP																NA	NA	
1964	Kuzie Kuzmanich	1	Chevy	CSP	RSD	SJS	POR; 0†				CTR; 9	POR; 2	RAS	ASP		SAL; 4	**POR**; 14	JBA					OIR; 11	ASP	GHR; 3	SWF	JBA	ASP	ASP				7th	2232	
1964	Kuzie Kuzmanich	1N	Chevy					**EVG**; 3	**YAK**; 4	EUG; 10																				POR; 6	CSF	ASP	7th	2232	
1964	Unknown	NA	Unknown												TAC; 3				EVG; 2	SGS	BKS	ASP											7th	2232	
1965	Kuzie Kuzmanich	28	Pontiac	BRS	RSD	SJS	ASP	POR; 14																									NA	NA	
1965	Walt Ross	50	Pontiac						EVG; 2	BRS	**POR**; 2	ASP	POR; 4	ASP	ASP	CSF	ASP																NA	NA	
1966	Walt Ross	50	Pontiac	RSD	S99	ASP	ASP	DCS; 6	POR; 1*	ASP	OSS	VAL	S99	ASP	AMP	POR	SGV	CSF															NA	NA	
1967	Walt Ross	50	Pontiac	AMP	SGV	RSD	CPS	SHA	SAL; 17	POR; 4	ASP	SGV	OSS	ASP	ACF	RVR	SAL	JBA; 9	YAK	EVG	ASP	CSP											NA	NA	
1968	Walt Ross	50	Pontiac	RSD	ASP	KEA	VAL	ASP	AMP	DCS; 8	POR; 5	EVG; 18	EUG	MED	OSS	TCR	YAK	EVG	EUR	BKS	S99	CSP	SGS										NA	NA	

† - It is known Kuzmanich participated in this race, but his final position is unknown.
