= ARCA races at Shasta =

ARCA Menards Series West race at Shasta Speedway

Bill Schmitt Memorial 173
ARCA Menards Series West
- Venue: Shasta Speedway
- Location: Anderson, California; United States
- First race: 1967
- Distance: 65.625 miles (105.613 km)
- Laps: 173
- Previous names: First races No name (1967); Winston Shasta 100 (1976–1977, 1979); Old Milwaukee 100 (1978); Winston Shasta 150 (1981–1982); Mountain Dew 150 (1983–1984); Pepsi-Cola 150 (1985); Holiday Quality Foods 200 (1992–1993); Bill Schmitt Memorial 150 (2015); Shasta 150 (2023–2024); Second races Winston Shasta 150 (1978)
- Most wins (driver): Jim Robinson (3)
- Most wins (team): Schmitt Motorsports, Lois Williams (2)
- Most wins (manufacturer): Chevrolet (4)

Circuit information
- Surface: Asphalt
- Turns: 4

The Bill Schmitt Memorial 173 is an ARCA Menards Series West race held annually at Shasta Speedway. Trevor Huddleston is the defending winner of the event.

== History ==
The race was added for the 2023 season. Sean Hingorani was the first winner of the event under ARCA sanctioning and in 2024, Tyler Reif won the event. Following the race, it was announced that Shasta wouldn't return for 2025. However, in December 2025 it was announced that the race would return again in May 2026.

== Past winners ==
Year	Date	No.	Driver	Team	Manufacturer	Race Distance		Race Time	Average Speed (mph)	Report	Ref
Year	Date	No.	Driver	Team	Manufacturer	Laps	Miles (km)	Race Time	Average Speed (mph)	Report	Ref
1967	April 30	45	Scotty Cain (1)	Bill Clinton (1)	Ford (1)	100	33.300 (53.59)	N/A	N/A	Report	
1968 - 1975	Not held										
1976	July 10	73	Bill Schmitt (1)	Schmitt Motorsports (1)	Chevrolet (1)	99	32.967 (53.06)	0:30:00	60.851	Report	
1977	August 27	48	Jim Walker (1)	Walker Racing (1)	Chevrolet (2)	100	33.300 (53.59)	0:26:21	60.905	Report	
1978	April 30	01	Jimmy Insolo (1)	Gerald Craker (1)	Pontiac (1)	100	33.300 (53.59)	0:38:55	38.543	Report	
1978	August 26	01	Jimmy Insolo (2)	Gerald Craker (2)	Pontiac (2)	150	49.950 (80.39)	0:48:14	46.648	Report	
1979	July 21	73	Bill Schmitt (2)	Schmitt Motorsports (2)	Pontiac (3)	100	33.300 (53.59)	0:29:32	67.705	Report	
1980	Not held										
1981	August 8	78	Jim Robinson (1)	Jack Williams (1)	Oldsmobile (1)	150	49.950 (80.39)	0:42:43	70.231	Report	
1982	July 24	7	Ron Eaton (1)	Eaton Racing (1)	Buick (1)	150	49.950 (80.39)	0:41:05	73.022	Report	
1983	August 6	78	Jim Robinson (2)	Lois Williams (1)	Oldsmobile (2)	150	49.950 (80.39)	0:41:44	71.885	Report	
1984	August 4	95	Derrike Cope (1)	Jefferson Racing (1)	Ford (2)	150	49.950 (80.39)	0:42:37	70.671	Report	
1985	May 11	78	Jim Robinson (3)	Lois Williams (2)	Oldsmobile (3)	150	49.950 (80.39)	0:43:56	68.285	Report	
1986 - 1991	Not held										
1992	June 13	75	Bill Sedgwick (1)	Spears Motorsports (1)	Chevrolet (3)	200	66.600 (107.18)	1:01:27	65.094	Report	
1993	June 19	37	Rick Carelli (1)	Chesrown Racing (1)	Chevrolet (4)	200	66.600 (107.18)	1:07:17	59.450	Report	
1994 - 2014	Not held										
2015	May 30	99	Chris Eggleston (1)	Bill McAnally Racing (1)	Toyota (1)	150	49.950 (80.39)	0:58:12	57.990	Report	
2016 - 2022	Not held										
2023	July 29	15	Sean Hingorani (1)	Venturini Motorsports (1)	Toyota (2)	150	56.250 (90.53)	0:47:52	70.508	Report	
2024	July 27	13	Tyler Reif (1)	Central Coast Racing (1)	Toyota (3)	150	56.250 (90.53)	0:43:27	77.675	Report	
2025	Not held										
2026	May 2	50	Trevor Huddleston (1)	High Point Racing (1)	Ford (3)	173	65.625 (105.613)	1:03:30	61.171	Report	

=== Manufacturer wins ===
# Wins	Make	Years Won
4	Chevrolet	1976, 1977, 1992, 1993
3	Ford	1967, 1984, 2026
3	Pontiac	1978, 1979
3	Oldsmobile	1981, 1983, 1985
3	Toyota	2015, 2023, 2024
1	Buick	1982
