= Johnny Steele (racing driver) =

American racing driver (born 1934)

- Born: December 20, 1934 (age 91); Carmichael, California, U.S.

NASCAR Cup Series career
- 11 races run over 6 years
- Best finish: 92nd (1967)
- First race: 1965 Motor Trend 500 (Riverside)
- Last race: 1971 Miller High Life 500 (Ontario)
Wins	Top tens	Poles
0	0	0

ARCA Menards Series West career
- 145 races run over 12 years
- Best finish: 3rd (1965, 1966)
- First race: 1964 Evergreen 200 (Evergreen)
- Last race: 1978 Old Milwaukee 100 (Shasta)
- First win: 1966 Race 10 (Stockton)
- Last win: 1968 Race 7 (Douglas County)
Wins	Top tens	Poles
5	71	0
- Statistics up to date as of June 3, 2026.

Johnny Steele (born December 20, 1934) is an American former professional stock car racing driver. He primarily competed in the NASCAR Winston West Series between 1964 and 1978.

== Racing career ==
Steele began competing in the NASCAR Pacific Coast Late Model Division in 1964, running twelve races car and scoring six top-tens. He ran twelve of fourteen races in 1965, scoring eight top-tens. He finished third in the standings. He also made his USAC Stock Car Series debut at Hanford Motor Speedway, finishing tenth. In 1966, Steele ran full-time, finish top-ten in eleven of the season's fifteen races and scoring two wins, the first coming at Stockton 99 Speedway. He would again finish third in the final standings. He made two Cup starts, finishing thirteenth at Riverside and twenty-fifth at Bristol Motor Speedway; he also failed to qualify at Rockingham Speedway. He attempted all but one Pacific Coast Late Model Division race in 1967, failing to qualify at Portland Speedway but scoring eleven top-tens and two wins. Steele ran five Grand National races in 1967, running four races in a row late in the season following a start at Riverside in the season's second race; he failed to finish any of his starts. In 1968, Steele ran all twenty races in the Pacific Coast Late Model Division, scoring nine top tens and his final career win at Douglas County Speedway. In the race at Riverside, he finished thirty-first due to a crash. Steele competed in eighteen Pacific Coast Late Model races in 1969, failing to win but scoring a career-high twelve top-tens. In the Grand National race at Riverside, he only ran four laps before retiring with an oil leak and finishing forty-third. Steele ran fifteen races in the renamed Grand National West in 1970, scoring nine top-tens. He did not compete in any Grand National races, but would return to the USAC Stock Car Series, finishing twenty-sixth at Sears Point Racway and failing to qualify at Phoenix International Raceway. In 1971, Steele ran ten races in the renamed Winston West Series, scoring three top-tens. He made his final start in the renamed Winston Cup Series at Ontario Motor Speedway, finishing thirty-seventh due to engine issues. Steele had a rough 1972, only finishing one of the ten West races he started, scoring an eighth-place result. He would also fail to qualify for the Winston Cup combination races at Riverside and Ontario. Steele opened the 1973 West season with another eighth-place finish, and after finishing the next three races would then retire after thirteen or fewer laps in his following seven starts. He would not compete in the series again until 1977, running three races in a row but failing to finish any of them. He also competed in the Rose Classic at All American Speedway, finishing fourteenth. Steele ran his final three NASCAR races in 1978, scoring his final career top ten at All American Speedway and running his final race at Shasta Speedway. As of June 2024, Steele was tenth on the all-time starts list for the West Series.
