= Clyde Prickett =

American racing driver (born 1932)

- Born: October 3, 1932 (age 94); Fresno, California, U.S.
- Awards: West Coast Stock Car Hall of Fame (2018)

NASCAR Cup Series career
- 3 races run over 3 years
- Best finish: 75th (1967)
- First race: 1966 Motor Trend 500 (Riverside)
- Last race: 1968 Motor Trend 500 (Riverside)
Wins	Top tens	Poles
0	0	0

ARCA Menards Series West career
- 38 races run over 4 years
- Best finish: 7th (1968)
- First race: 1965 California 100 (Sacramento)
- Last race: 1968 Race 19 (Clovis)
- First win: 1968 Race 11 (Medford)
Wins	Top tens	Poles
1	17	0
- Statistics up to date as of October 21, 2026.

Clyde Prickett (born October 3, 1932) is an American former professional stock car racing driver. He competed in NASCAR in the 1960s.

== Racing career ==
Prickett competed in the NASCAR Late Model Sportsman National Championship between 1954 and 1960, finishing fourth in the standings in 1955. He scored at least 15 wins during his time in the series. Between 1961 and 1971, he also competed in the NASCAR Modified National Championship, scoring at least seven wins.

In 1965, Prickett made his NASCAR Pacific Coast Late Model Division debut at the California State Fairgrounds Race Track, finishing seventh; he finished tenth in the following race at Ascot Park. He attempted eight races in 1966, failing to finish six of the seven races he qualified for as wall as failing to qualify at Ascot Park; in the lone race he finished, he scored a sixth-place result at the California State Fairgrounds. His starts included his NASCAR Grand National Series debut at Riverside International Raceway, where he drove for Wendell Scott; he only completed 11 laps before retiring from the race with transmission issues, finishing 39th.

Prickett ran thirteen of nineteen Pacific Coast Late Model races in 1967, scoring seven top-tens with a best finish of second at Shasta Speedway; he was also awarded the pole in the season finale at Clovis Speedway and led two laps. He finished 20th in the combination race at Riverside due to distributor issues after 104 laps.

Prickett's final Pacific Coast Late Model Division season came in 1968, where he ran a majority of the schedule; he qualified for 16 of 17 attempts, failing to qualify at Orange Show Speedway, and he scored nine top-tens, including his lone career win at Medford Speedway. He finished seventh in the standings. In the combination race at Riverside, his final Grand National start, he was running at the finish and scored a career-best 14th.

== Motorsports career results ==
=== NASCAR ===
(key) (Bold – Pole position awarded by qualifying time. Italics – Pole position earned by points standings or practice time. * – Most laps led.)

==== Grand National Series ====
NASCAR Grand National Series results
Year	Team	No.	Make	1	2	3	4	5	6	7	8	9	10	11	12	13	14	15	16	17	18	19	20	21	22	23	24	25	26	27	28	29	30	31	32	33	34	35	36	37	38	39	40	41	42	43	44	45	46	47	48	49	NGNSC	Pts	Ref
1966	Scott Racing	34	Ford	AUG	RSD; 39	DAY	DAY	DAY	CAR	BRI	ATL	HCY	CLB	GPS	BGS	NWS	MAR	DAR	LGY	MGR	MON	RCH	CLT	DTS	ASH	PIF	SMR	AWS	BLV	GPS	DAY	ODS	BRR	OXF	FON	ISP	BRI	SMR	NSV	ATL	CLB	AWS	BLV	BGS	DAR	HCY	RCH	HBO	MAR	NWS	CLT	CAR	NA	NA	
1967	Dan Dostinich	88	Chevy	AUG	RSD; 20	DAY	DAY	DAY	AWS	BRI	GPS	BGS	ATL	CLB	HCY	NWS	MAR	SVH	RCH	DAR	BLV	LGY	CLT	ASH	MGR	SMR	BIR	CAR	GPS	MGY	DAY	TRN	OXF	FDA	ISP	BRI	SMR	NSV	ATL	BGS	CLB	SVH	DAR	HCY	RCH	BLV	HBO	MAR	NWS	CLT	CAR	AWS	75th	1272	
1968	Dan Dostinich	88	Chevy	MGR	MGY	RSD; 14	DAY	BRI	RCH	ATL	HCY	GPS	CLB	NWS	MAR	AUG	AWS	DAR	BLV	LGY	CLT	ASH	MGR	SMR	BIR	CAR	GPS	DAY	ISP	OXF	FDA	TRN	BRI	SMR	NSV	ATL	CLB	BGS	AWS	SBO	LGY	DAR	HCY	RCH	BLV	HBO	MAR	NWS	AUG	CLT	CAR	JFC	80th	NA	

==== Pacific Coast Late Model Division ====
NASCAR Pacific Coast Late Model Division results
Year	Team	No.	Make	1	2	3	4	5	6	7	8	9	10	11	12	13	14	15	16	17	18	19	20	NPCLMDC	Pts	Ref
1965	Bill Clinton	4	Mercury	BRS	RSD	SJS	ASP	POR	EVG	BRS	POR	ASP	POR	ASP	ASP	CSF; 7	ASP; 10							NA	NA	
1966	Scott Racing	34	Ford	RSD; 39																				20th	584	
1966	Clyde Prickett	34	Ford		S99; 15	ASP; 15	ASP	DCS	POR	ASP	OSS; 21	VAL	S99	ASP; DNQ	AMP; 11	POR		CSF; 6						20th	584	
1966	Dan Dostinich	88	Chevy														SGV; 14							20th	584	
1967	Clyde Prickett	34	Ford	AMP; 15	SGV; 7																			12th	1700	
1967	Dan Dostinich	88	Chevy			RSD; 9																		12th	1700	
1967	Dan Dostinich	88	Ford				CPS; 11	SHA; 2	SAL; 15	POR; 14	ASP; 8	SGV	OSS	ASP; 11	ACF	RVR	SAL	JBA	YAK; 8	EVG; 4	ASP; 9	**CSP**; 13		12th	1700	
1968	Dan Dostinich	88	Chevy	RSD; 6	ASP; 20	KEA; 12	VAL; 12	ASP; 2	AMP; 14	DCS; 4	POR; 4	EVG; 19	EUG; 4	MED; 1	OSS; DNQ	TCR; 7	YAK	EVG; 14	EUR	BKS; 9	S99; 6	CSP; 16	SGS	7th	902	
