= Pepsi 200 =

There have been three NASCAR Busch Series races and one NASCAR Winston West Series race named Pepsi 200:

- Pepsi 200 (Portland), run at Portland Speedway in 1974
- Pepsi 200 (South Boston), run at South Boston Speedway in 1986
- Pepsi 200 (Hickory), run at Hickory Motor Speedway in 1988 and 1989
- Pepsi 200 presented by DeVilbiss, run at Michigan International Speedway in 1998
