= 1974 NASCAR Winston West Series =

21st season of the NASCAR Winston West Series

Seasons
- ← 1973 1975 →

The 1974 NASCAR Winston West Series was the 21st season of the series. The title was won by Ray Elder, his fifth in the series.

== Schedule and results ==
The 1974 season included 28 individual races, although some tracks were run twice. The races at Riverside, as well as the finale at Ontario, were in combination with the NASCAR Winston Cup Series.

Date	Name	Racetrack	Location	Winner
January 26	Winston Western 500	Riverside International Raceway	Riverside, California	Cale Yarborough
April 21	Altamont 100	Altamont Speedway	Livermore, California	Jimmy Insolo
May 3	Stockton 100	Stockton 99 Speedway	Stockton, California	Jack McCoy
May 11	Manzanita 100	Manzanita Speedway	Phoenix, Arizona	Jack McCoy
May 12	Corona 100	Corona Speedway	Tucson, Arizona	Ray Elder
May 24	Chula Vista 100	South Bay Park Speedway	Chula Vista, California	Jim Boyd
May 27	Ascot Memorial 100	Ascot Park	Gardena, California	Sonny Easley
June 9	Tuborg 400	Riverside International Raceway	Riverside, California	Cale Yarborough
June 23	Westwood 150	Westwood Raceway	Vancouver, British Columbia	Ray Elder
June 26	Victoria 150	Western Speedway	Victoria, British Columbia	Sonny Easley
June 29	Tacoma 150	Spanaway Speedway	Tacoma, Washington	Jimmy Insolo
July 1	Stateline 100	Northwest Speedway	Stateline, Idaho	Jimmy Insolo
July 3	Umatilla 100	Umatilla Speedway	Hermiston, Oregon	Jimmy Insolo
July 4	Pepsi 100	Portland Speedway	Portland, Oregon	Jimmy Insolo
July 12	Medford 100	Medford Speedway	Medford, Oregon	Jack McCoy
July 13	Eugene 100	Eugene Speedway	Eugene, Oregon	Jack McCoy
July 14	Coos Bay 150	Coos Bay Speedway	Coos Bay, Oregon	Jack McCoy
July 27	Cajon 150	Cajon Speedway	Santee, California	Ray Elder
August 2	Las Vegas 150	Craig Road Speedway	North Las Vegas, Nevada	Jack McCoy
August 4	Gardena 100	Ascot Park	Gardena, California	Ray Elder
August 17	Livermore 100	Altamont Speedway	Livermore, California	Ray Elder
August 23	Clovis 100	Clovis Speedway	Clovis, California	Sonny Easley
September 1	Evergreen 200	Evergreen Speedway	Monroe, Washington	Harry Jefferson
September 7	Yakima 100	Yakima Speedway	Yakima, Washington	Harry Jefferson
September 8	Pepsi 200	Portland Speedway	Portland, Oregon	Jimmy Insolo
September 14	Alphy's 150	Speedway 605	Irwindale, California	Sonny Easley
September 28	Ascot 100	Ascot Park	Gardena, California	Jimmy Insolo
November 24	Los Angeles Times 500	Ontario Motor Speedway	Ontario, California	Bobby Allison

== Full Drivers' Championship ==
(key) Bold – Pole position awarded by time. Italics – Pole position set by owner's points. * – Most laps led. † – Ineligible for West Series points

Pos	Driver	RSD	AMP	S99	MSP	COR	SBP	ASP	RSD	WER	WSP	SPS	STA	USP	POR	MED	EUG	CBS	CAJ	CRS	ASP	AMP	CSP	EVG	YAK	POR	SGB	ASP	ONT	Pts
1	Ray Elder	34	5	3	14	**1***	15	19*		1	3	5*	5	**3**	**3**	12*	2	**2**	1	3	1*	1	2*	4	5	4	5	18	36	1942
2	Jack McCoy	21	**7***	**1***	1*	3	2	3	34	17	**4**	**2**	4	11*	6	**1**	**1***	1*	2	**1***	**14**	2*	19	2	7	19	3	22	33	1884
3	Jimmy Insolo	23	1	2	2	20	14	22	22	**19**	6	1	1*	1	1*	5	14	8	5	14	2	3	15	**18**	3	1	**2**	**1***	19	1849.5
4	Ron Gautsche		2	5	4	9	6	5		3	5	6	7	14	9	6	10	5	14	6	13	8	7	19	15	9	8	11		1837.75
5	Sonny Easley	12	3	4	20	14	**23**	**1**	7	2*	1*	16	**12**	9	10	4	5	10	**3**	2	16	14	**1**	10	**2**	3	1*	10	26	1836.5
6	Markey James		12	8	11	10	17	24	18	9	9	8	22	15	24	13	13	3	7	12	8	4	5	24	12	7	7	14		1617.25
7	Jim Boyd			7	7	6	1*	2		12	10	7	8	4	18	2	7	4	9	5	3	9	18	25	19	22		6		1595.25
8	George Behlman		21	10	22	15	4	15	29	18	11	23	17	18	21	9	15	15	6	4	15	11	6	6	9	6	14	7		1574
9	John Dineen		10	13	8	13	3	7		13		17	10	6	16	15	18	20	8	7	10	6	9	15	11		6	2		1554.25
10	Ernie Stierly		19	11	**5**	11	16	10		22	2	19	3	2	8	17	19		4*	15	22	15		20	4	13	21			1387.25
11	Chuck Wahl		DNQ	12	19	21	10	6	8	5	17	18	2		2	10	3	17	18	9	17	**10**		29	6	17	11		20	1349.25
12	Jack Simpson		15	9	10	5	7	14	16	16		11	20	13	13	7	16	18	12	8	19			14	22	15	20			1335.5
13	Walt Price		18					11	21	15	8	4	9	19	19	11	8	19	15		5			8	13	11	10	3	31	1242.25
14	Bill Schmitt		DNQ								20	20		5	14	8	9	12	19	13	4	19	4	11	21	10	12	19		1152
15	Johnny Anderson	20	22	18	16	17	5	16	28	4	12	9	19	22					11	10	7	16					16	8		1036
16	Bruce Blodgett		16	17	24	19	24			11		24	21			16	22	13		11		7	11	21	23		18	12		954
17	Richard White	19	8		6	2	21	4											22		11	21	13	13	25		9	17		747
18	Drick Kranzler		6							10		21	13	17		18	20	21		16				16	17	12	15			742.25
19	John Soares Jr.		17	19	23		11	12				22	18	21	15	3	6	16			26	17		28	24					692.75
20	Fred Connett									14	16	12		16	20		12	14						12	16	14				685.75
21	Jim McMillan									6	13	15	15		11										10	5				522.75
22	Sam Stanley		DNQ		9	23				24	19	13	11	23	25								3				25	20		504
23	Phil Goulet											10		12	17	14	17	9								8				479.5
24	Don Hall										7	3	6	10	12									23		20			27	472.75
25	Steve Vaughn		13					13					14	8	22						6	12						23		443.25
26	Richie Potts		DNQ		26		13	17		23		14					21	11			23	23								425
27	Don Puskarich																					5	10					4		374.75
28	Don Pruitt	32	9	16			12	20								19					21							16		357.5
29	Leon Fox		4						14						7									22	8	21				300
30	Harry Jefferson	27																						1*	1*	2			34	294
31	Buck Peralta		11		18	12	18		11										10											285.75
32	Glenn Francis		23						13										17		18	13	21				19		22	284.5
33	Gary Jenkins		DNQ		12	18	8												21	17	25									280
34	Bill Cheesbourg				3	8																	8					15		265.75
35	Johnny Kieper													7	23		11	7												254.5
36	Jim Lee		DNQ	15			9	18	32										13											251.75
37	Rodger Patterson		20		25			8											16				14							248.5
38	J. C. Danielsen	11					19														12			5	20					248.25
39	Hershel McGriff	10							35						4		4	6												225.75
40	Jerry Oliver		24	6																		20					13			207.75
41	Ross Surgenor	33	DNQ						12	20	15													7						191.25
42	John Poyner													20										9	14					189.5
43	Chuck Bown	35							20						5									27		16			39	169.25
44	G. T. Tallas		DNQ	20	17	16	22																							165.25
45	Carl Joiner																							3		**18***				165
46	Larry Sprole									8	14																			152
47	Bob England		14	14																		18								149.75
48	Gary Johnson																					24		26	18	24				144
49	Tom Cox				21	24													23				16							137.25
50	Ed Sauer																				9							9		132.25
51	Vaughn Coogan									21														17						129.5
52	Dale Lee				15	4																								116.25
53	Mike Gibson				13	22																								88.75
54	Bill Spencer																										4			84.25
55	Duke Parsons							23													20									77
56	Rodger Ward																					22	17							76.25
57	Ray Cline																											5		70.5
58	Jim Bettini																										17			70
59	Bob Hyvenon					7																								68
60	David Pombo																						12							61.75
61	Don Noel																						20				24			61.5
62	Larry Runyon																											13		61.25
63	Larry Bell									25																23				58.5
64	Bob Kauf																		20											50.25
65	Bill Osborne	26																									22		28	43.5
66	Hugh Pearson							21	19																				37	43.25
67	Don Reynolds								10																		23		18	41.25
68	Bill Veyl																											21		33.75
	Carl Adams	13																											40	
	Jim Schmitt									7																				
	Chuck Becker Jr.							9																						
	Eddie Bradshaw								9																					
	Bruce Hill																												13	
	Norm Ellefson												16																	
	George Stuart										18																			
	Russ Bullen						20																							
	Odie Robertson	24																												
	Russ Puskovitch																				24									
	Gary Matthews								26																					
	Larry Esau	29																												
	Dick Bown								30																					
	Budd Hagelin	31																												
	Bob Kennedy		DNQ						DNQ																					
	James Hylton	DNQ																												
	Dick Simon	DNQ																												
	Billy Vukovich Jr.	DNQ																												
	Don Graham		DNQ																											
	Larry Richardson								DNQ																					

== See also ==
- 1974 NASCAR Winston Cup Series
