= 1970 NASCAR Grand National West =

17th season of the NASCAR Grand National West

Seasons
- ← 1969 1971 →

The 1970 NASCAR Grand National West season was the 17th season of the series and the only season run with the Grand National West name. The title was won by Ray Elder, his second in succession.

== Schedule and results ==
The 1970 season included 19 individual races, although Riverside International Raceway, Ascot Park, and San Gabriel Valley Speedway hosted two races each. Both races at Riverside were in combination with the NASCAR Grand National Series.

Date	Name	Racetrack	Location	Winner
January 18	Motor Trend 500	Riverside International Raceway	Riverside, California	A. J. Foyt
April 12	South Bay 100	Ascot Park	Gardena, California	Ray Elder
May 2	Jim Cook Memorial Benefit 100	San Gabriel Valley Speedway	Irwindale, California	Jack McCoy
May 10	Sacramento 100	California State Fairgrounds	Sacramento, California	Tiny Lund
June 14	Falstaff 400	Riverside International Raceway	Riverside, California	Richard Petty
July 2	†	Yakima Speedway	Yakima, Washington	Jack McCoy
July 4	†	Evergreen Speedway	Monroe, Washington	Dick Bown
July 5	Jantzen Beach Party 150	Jantzen Beach Arena	Portland, Oregon	Ray Elder
August 7	†	Craig Road Speedway	North Las Vegas, Nevada	Jack McCoy
August 8	Orange Show 150	Orange Show Speedway	San Bernardino, California	Jack McCoy
August 15	Saugus 150	Saugus Speedway	Saugus, California	Dick Bown
August 28	†	Rogue Valley Raceway	Medford, Oregon	Hershel McGriff
August 29	†	Salem Speedway	Salem, Oregon	Dick Bown
August 31	Spanaway 150	Spanaway Speedway	Tacoma, Washington	Dick Bown
September 4	†	Tri-City Raceway	West Richland, Washington	Ray Elder
September 7	Victoria 100	Western Speedway	Victoria, British Columbia	Dick Bown
October 10	Stockton 150	Stockton 99 Speedway	Stockton, California	Dick Bown
October 17	†	Ascot Park	Gardena, California	Jack McCoy
October 31	San Gabriel Valley 100	San Gabriel Valley Speedway	Irwindale, California	Ray Elder

† This race was not given a name

== Full Drivers' Championship ==
(key) Bold – Pole position awarded by time. Italics – Pole position set by owner's points. * – Most laps led. † – Ineligible for West Series points

Pos	Driver	RSD	ASP	SGB	CSF	RSD	YAK	EVG	JBA	CRS	OSS	SGS	MED	SAL	SPS	TCR	WSP	S99	ASP	SGB	Pts
1	Ray Elder	24	**1***	2	16	19	**3**	2	**1***	**4***	8*	2	2*	3	3	**1**	5	5	2	**1***	1024
2	Jack McCoy	30	3	**1***	21	6	1*	4	4	1	1	5	**5**	4	14	2*	9	**6**	**1***	3	1004
3	Jerry Oliver	9	9	7	4	22	8	20	11	11	7	8	9	5	12	4	7	12	5	27	971
4	Bob England	43	7	8	10	13	11	15	10	8	15	16	14	11	10	6	8	13	13	12	934
5	Frank James	21	10	6	3	15	6	5	13	13	5	18	18	6	13	5	10	22	3	7	926
6	Dick Bown	22	12	17	5	25	18	**1***	5		**3**	**1***	6	**1***	1*	12	**1***	1*	21	2	922
7	G. T. Tallas	31	4	13	20	24	19	13	15	20	9	20	4	10	11	9		DNQ	14	18	813
8	Johnny Steele				13		17	10	2	3	6	10	12	7	4	14	3	18	8	22	686
9	John Soares Jr.	DNQ			6	4	7	8					11	14	**9**	16	2	14	4	5	657
10	Scotty Cain	42		14	9	28	4	14			12		15	16	7	11		7	16	6	612
11	Jimmy Insolo	25	5		14	29				5	4	3								4	454
12	Kevin Terris	12	DNQ	5	11	38	20	21												8	416
13	Ranny Dodd	23	14	16		26		9		6		9									360
14	Don Brandt											15	7	9		15		9		15	321
15	Carl Joiner	37								19			8	13	2	13	6				318
16	Paul Dorrity	19			19	40				7				DNQ	8			2		28	313
17	Pat Fay			20		32				12		14	DNQ	18					19		312
18	Doug McGriff									23			17	DNQ	18	10		8	23		307
19	Les Loeser Jr.	32			24							24	DNQ								211
20	Frank Burnett				7						14							20	17	14	206
21	Harry Schilling						15	12	8			DNQ						17	20		206
	Don Simkins		6	9	22	12	14	22	12	10		12	3	8		8		4	6	23	
	Ed Brown				25		10	7	7	18			DNQ		6	3	4	3		10	
	Don Noel	38	2	21	8	33	2	3		2	2	4							DNQ		
	Sam Rose	15	8	4	23		9	19			11		DNQ								
	Glenn Francis		11	15		20						17						16	12	17	
	Sinclair Buckstaff						21	17		15		7						19	9	20	
	Joe Clark					8	12	16	6		17	25									
	Ray Johnstone			3	2	31					16								11	24	
	Hershel McGriff						16	11	3				1	2							
	Barney Montoya										19	13						10	18	19	
	George Wiltshire	DNQ							14						17	17		21		16	
	Les Cooper		13	19	18					16											
	Bill Pratt			12	15	37						19									
	Dale Lee												DNQ	DNQ	16	7			7		
	Bob McDonald																	11	10	9	
	Bud Hickey								9					17	5						
	Jerry Griffin		DNQ		12	21					10										
	Bob Kauf							DNQ				22							22	13	
	Harry Jefferson						5	6													
	Dick Guldstrand	10	DNQ			5															
	Mike Mohr												13	12							
	Steve Davis												10	15							
	Bo Reeder		15	11																	
	Hank Dekker Jr.	DNQ			17					9											
	Don Walker							18							15						
	Chuck Bown												16	19							
	Joe Roletto																		15	21	
	Jim Good			10	28																
	Dick Kranzler	18										23									
	Pat Patrick			18	26														DNQ		
	Jim Cook	26								21											
	Frank Deiny	41										6									
	Steve Froines	27				39															
	Tiny Lund				**1***																
	Mel Larson					9															
	Tom Patton										DNQ								DNQ	11	
	Bill Foster											11									
	Fred Hay						13														
	Marty Kinerk										13										
	Robert Hale					14															
	J. R. Fritz									14											
	Clay Priola												DNQ	DNQ				15			
	Mike Bowers									17											
	Craig Murray										18										
	Tru Cheek											21									
	Herb Hill									22											
	Ed Howland					23															
	Jack Ickes																		24		
	Ron Hornaday																			25	
	Marion Collins																			26	
	Bill O'Neil				27								DNQ								
	Don Wooten																			29	
	L. T. Jones																			30	
	Bill Scott					36															
	Wendell Parnell			DNQ																	
	Curly Mills					DNQ															
	Chuck Becker Jr.										DNQ										
	Ed Tanferani												DNQ								
	Ken Shoemaker												DNQ								
	Russ Bullen																			DNQ	
	Harold Hardesty												QL								

== See also ==
- 1970 NASCAR Grand National Series
