= 1967 NASCAR Pacific Coast Late Model Division =

14th season of the NASCAR Pacific Coast Late Model Division

Seasons
- ← 1966 1968 →

The 1967 NASCAR Pacific Coast Late Model Division was the 14th season of the series. The title was won by Scotty Cain, his first in the series.

== Schedule and results ==
The 1967 season included 19 individual races, although Ascot Park hosted three races and San Gabriel Valley Speedway and Salem Speedway hosted two races each. The first two races of the season were held in 1966. The race at Riverside International Raceway was in combination with the NASCAR Grand National Series.

| Date | Name | Racetrack | Location | Winner |
|---|---|---|---|---|
| November 27, 1966 | Altamont 150 | Altamont Motorsports Park | Tracy, California | Jack McCoy |
| December 4, 1966 | San Gabriel Valley 100 | San Gabriel Valley Speedway | Irwindale, California | Johnny Steele |
| January 22 | Motor Trend 500 | Riverside International Raceway | Riverside, California | Parnelli Jones |
| April 9 | † | Capital Speedway | Sacramento, California | Jim Cook |
| April 30 | † | Shasta Speedway | Anderson, California | Scotty Cain |
| May 13 | † | Salem Speedway | Salem, Oregon | Cliff Garner |
| May 14 | † | Portland Speedway | Portland, Oregon | Scotty Cain |
| May 27 | Ascot Park 100 Lappers | Ascot Park | Gardena, California | Ray Elder |
| May 30 | San Gabriel Valley 150 | San Gabriel Valley Speedway | Irwindale, California | Jack McCoy |
| July 1 | Orange Show 100 | Orange Show Speedway | San Bernardino, California | Cliff Garner |
| July 2 | Ascot 100 | Ascot Park | Gardena, California | Scotty Cain |
| July 16 | † | Alameda County Fairgrounds | Pleasanton, California | Scotty Cain |
| July 21 | † | Rogue Valley Raceway | Medford, Oregon | Scotty Cain |
| July 22 | † | Salem Speedway | Salem, Oregon | Johnny Steele |
| July 23 | † | Jantzen Beach Arena | Portland, Oregon | Cliff Garner |
| July 29 | Yakima 150 | Yakima Speedway | Yakima, Washington | Hershel McGriff |
| July 30 | † | Evergreen Speedway | Monroe, Washington | Jack McCoy |
| September 3 | Ascot Park 100 | Ascot Park | Gardena, California | Ray Elder |
| September 29 | † | Clovis Speedway | Clovis, California | Jack McCoy |

† This race was not given a name

== Full Drivers' Championship ==
(key) Bold – Pole position awarded by time. Italics – Pole position set by owner's points. * – Most laps led. † – Finishing position unknown

| Pos | Driver | AMP | SGV | RSD | CPS | SHA | SAL | POR | ASP | SGV | OSS | ASP | ACF | RVR | SAL | JBA | YAK | EVG | ASP | CSP | Pts |
|---|---|---|---|---|---|---|---|---|---|---|---|---|---|---|---|---|---|---|---|---|---|
| 1 | Scotty Cain | 5 | 5 | 3 (Note: Finished 7th overall) | **2** | **1*** | 3 | 1 | 12 | 8 | 19 | 1 | **1*** | **1** | 11 | 5 | 7 | 7 | 5 | 2 | 3326 |
| 2 | Ray Elder | 4 | 12 | 17 (Note: Finished 36th overall) | 13 | 9 | 13 | 7 | 1* | 9 | 2* | 6 | 3 | 2 | 2 | 11 | 3 | 2* | 1 | 11 | 2888 |
| 3 | Jim Cook | 18 | 11 | 10 (Note: Finished 23rd overall) | 1* | 6 | 6 | 10 | 7 | 6 | 7 | 7 | 12 | 9 | 9 | 8 | 4 | 12 | 8 | 16 | 2688 |
| 4 | Cliff Garner | | | 16 (Note: Finished 35th overall) | 12 | 7 | 1* | 18 | 5 | 3 | 1 | 10 | 5 | 3 | **3** | **1*** | 2 | **3** | 4 | 10 | 2566 |
| 5 | Johnny Steele | 9 | **1*** | 20 (Note: Finished 40th overall) | 8 | 11 | 16 | DNQ | 20 | 10 | 6 | 3 | 2 | 6 | 1 | 15 | 9 | 6 | 12 | 14 | 2468 |
| 6 | Jack McCoy | **1*** | 9 | 11 (Note: Finished 25th overall) | 17 | | | | **9** | **1*** | 12 | **4*** | | 4 | 4 | 2 | **10** | 1 | 11* | 1* | 2432 |
| 7 | Dave James | 12 | | | 10 | | 2 | 5 | 3 | 5 | 8 | 5 | 4 | | | | 5 | 15 | 3 | 3 | 2216 |
| 8 | Don Noel | 2 | 4 | 8 (Note: Finished 17th overall) | | 10 | 20 | 8 | 2 | 2 | **5** | | 10 | 8 | 6 | | | 9 | | 15 | 2176 |
| 9 | Jerry Oliver | 8 | 6 | 5 (Note: Finished 11th overall) | 4 | 4 | | | 11 | | | | 14 | | | | | | | 5 | 1922 |
| 10 | Chuck Prickett | | | 4 (Note: Finished 10th overall) | 18 | 3 | 11 | 12 | 19 | | 11 | 16 | 20 | | | | | 10 | | | 1920 |
| 11 | Marvin Porter | 3 | 3 | 19 (Note: Finished 38th overall) | | | 5 | 2 | 10 | 7 | 18 | 21 | DNQ | | | | | | **2** | 4 | 1790 |
| 12 | Clyde Prickett | 15 | 7 | 9 (Note: Finished 20th overall) | 11 | 2 | 15 | 14 | 8 | | | 11 | | | | | 8 | 4 | 9 | **13** | 1700 |
| 13 | Walt Ross | QL | | | 9 | | | | 6 | 4 | 9 | 13 | | 14 | | | | | | | 1306 |
| 14 | Ed Brown | DNQ | 10 | Wth | | 5 | 9 | 17 | | | | | DNQ | 7 | 8 | 7 | | | | 23 | 1230 |
| 15 | Frank Burnett | 17 | | 12 (Note: Finished 30th overall) | 15 | | | 15 | | 12 | 16 | 12 | DNQ | | | | | | | 6 | 1114 |
| 16 | Paul Dorrity | | | | | 8 | 7 | 9 | | 14 | | | 15 | | | | | | | | 1074 |
| 17 | Hershel McGriff | | | | | | 14 | 19 | | | | | 9 | 11 | 5 | 3 | 1* | 5 | | | 1046 |
| 18 | Ranny Dodd | | | 15 (Note: Finished 33rd overall) | | | | | | 11 | 13 | | 18 | | | | | | 6 | 12 | 852 |
| 19 | Tom Moore | | | | 19 | 12 | | | 17 | | 10 | 19 | 19 | | | | | | | | 728 |
| 20 | Joe Clark | 13 | 8 | 13 (Note: Finished 31st overall) | | | | | | | | | | | | | | | | | 656 |
| | Sam Rose | | | | | | 8 | 11 | 18 | | 15 | 14 | 7 | 10 | 12 | 10 | 11 | 13 | 13 | 19 | |
| | Bo Reeder | | | 6 (Note: Finished 12th overall) | 14 | | 12 | | 16 | | | 9 | 8 | 13 | 14 | 13 | 12 | | | 17 | |
| | Bruce Worrell | | 2 | 2 (Note: Finished 6th overall) | 6 | | | | 4 | 15 | | 2 | 11 | | | | | | | 20 | |
| | Bob Link | 7 | | DNQ | | | 10 | 13 | 13 | | | | 6 | | | 14 | | | 15 | 18 | |
| | Carl Joiner | | | | | | **4** | **6*** | | | | | | 5 | | 4 | 13 | | | | |
| | Harold Hardesty | | | | | | | | | | | | | 12 | 10 | 6 | 6 | 8 | | | |
| | Jerry Draper | | | | | | 19 | 3 | | | | | | | 7 | | | 11 | | | |
| | Chuck Becker Jr. | | | | | | | 20 | 14 | 13 | 3 | | | | | | | | | | |
| | Nat Reeder | | | | 3 | | 18 | | | | | | | 15 | 15 | | | | | | |
| | Kuzie Kuzmanich | | | | | | 17 | 4 | | | | | | | | 9 | | | | | |
| | Nick Lari | | | | 5 | | | | | | | 17 | 17 | | | | | | | | |
| | Dave Logan | 10 | 14 | | | | | | | | | | 16 | | | | | | | | |
| | Frank Reeder | | 13 | | | | | | | | | | | | | | | 14 | | 24 | |
| | Bill Whitmore | | | | | | | | | | | | | | 13 | 12 | | | | | |
| | Robert Hale | | | | | | | | | | | 18 | | | | | | | 10 | | |
| | Clem Proctor | | | | | | | | | | | | | | | | | | 7 | 21 | |
| | Bob McDonald | 20 | | | | | | | | | | | | | | | | | | 9 | |
| | Roger Parr | | | | 16 | | | | | | | 15 | | | | | | | | | |
| | Guy Jones | | | | | | | | 15 | | | | | | | | | 17 | | | |
| | George Wiltshire | | | | 21 | | | | | | | | | | | | 15 | | | | |
| | Wendell Parnell | | | | | | | | | | 17 | 20 | | | | | | | | | |
| | Parnelli Jones | | | 1* | | | | | | | | | | | | | | | | | |
| | Don Walker | | | | | | | | | | 4 | | | | | | | | | | |
| | Bill Amick | 6 | | | | | | | | | | | | | | | | | | | |
| | Dan Gurney | | | 7 (Note: Finished 14th overall) | | | | | | | | | | | | | | | | | |
| | Everett Edlund | | | | | | | | | | | | | | | | | | | 7 | |
| | Ray Johnstone | | | | 7 | | | | | | | | | | | | | | | | |
| | Louis Stuart | | | | | | | | | | | 8 | | | | | | | | | |
| | Al Pombo | | | | | | | | | | | | | | | | | | | 8 | |
| | Vel Rogers | 11 | | | | | | | | | | | | | | | | | | | |
| | Ed Leslie | | | | | | | | | | | | 13 | | | | | | | | |
| | Bill Ferrier | | | | | | | | | | | | | | | | | | 14 | | |
| | Bill Small | | | DNQ | | | | | | | 14 | | | | | | | | | | |
| | Jim Marine | 14 | | | | | | | | | | | | | | | | | | | |
| | Fred Hay | | | | | | | | | | | | | | | | 14 | | | | |
| | Walt Price | | | 14 (Note: Finished 32nd overall) | | | | | | | | | | | | | | | | | |
| | B. J. Reese | | | | | | | 16 | | | | | | | | | | | | | |
| | Jack Jeffery | | | | | | | | | | | | | | | | | 16 | | | |
| | Les Cooper | | | | | | | | | | | | | | | | | | 16 | | |
| | Billy Vukovich Jr. | 16 | | | | | | | | | | | | | | | | | | | |
| | Curtis Turner | | | 18 (Note: Finished 37th overall) | | | | | | | | | | | | | | | | | |
| | Bob Darby | | | | | | | | | | | | | | | | | 18 | | | |
| | Ren Reugbrink | 19 | | | | | | | | | | | | | | | | | | | |
| | Larry Burton | | | | 20 | | | | | | | | | | | | | | | | |
| | Tom Roa | | | 21 (Note: Finished 42nd overall) | | | | | | | | | | | | | | | | | |
| | Larry Paulsen | | | | | | 21 | | | | | | | | | | | | | | |
| | Vallie Engelauf | | | | | | | | | | | | | | | | | | | 22 | |
| | Rod Poor | | | | | | | | | | | 22 | | | | | | | | | |
| | Carl Cardey | | | 22 (Note: Finished 44th overall) | | | | | | | | | | | | | | | | | |
| | Chuck Rowe | DNQ | | | | | | | | | | | | | | | | | | | |
| | George Durade | DNQ | | | | | | | | | | | | | | | | | | | |
| | Fred Hunt | DNQ | | | | | | | | | | | | | | | | | | | |
| | Dick Johnson | | | DNQ | | | | | | | | | | | | | | | | | |
| | Terry Howden | | | | | | | DNQ | | | | | | | | | | | | | |
