= West Series races at Stockton =

NASCAR K&N Pro Series West races at Stockton 99 Speedway

NASCAR K&N Pro Series West at Stockton 99 Speedway
NASCAR K&N Pro Series West
- Venue: Stockton 99 Speedway
- Location: Stockton, California, United States
- First race: 1966
- Last race: 2014
- Distance: 25 mi (40.234 km) (1966, 1968, 1973–1974, 1978); 37.5 mi (60.350 km) (1970–1972, 1981–1983, 2004, 2013–2014); 38.75 mi (62.362 km) (2006, 2012); 39.75 mi (63.971 km) (2005); 50 mi (80.467 km) (1980, 2004, 2006); 50.5 mi (81.272 km) (2002); 51.5 mi (82.881 km) (2005); 51.75 mi (83.284 km) (2003)
- Laps: 100 (1966, 1968, 1973–1974, 1978); 150 (1970–1972, 1981–1983, 2004, 2013–2014); 155 (2006, 2012); 159 (2005); 200 (1980, 2004, 2006); 202 (2002); 206 (2005); 207 (2003)
- Previous names: First races No name (1966, 1968); Stockton 150 (1970–1973, 2014); Stockton 100 (1974); Winston Stockton 100 (1978); Stockton Winston 200 (1980); Stockton Winston 150 (1981–1983); NAPA 200 by Stockton Speedway Dodge Country (2002); NAPA 200 Dodge Country Presented by Havoline (2003); Havoline / NAPA Auto Parts 150 (2004); Autozone Twin Championships by Havoline (2005); Basalite 150 by Havoline (2006); Pick-N-Pull 150 (2012); G-Oil 150 (2013); Second races No name (1966); Dodge Country / Havoline / NAPA 200 (2004); 4th Annual Dodge Country / NAPA 200 (2005); Dodge Country 200 (2006)
- Most wins (driver): Jack McCoy (5)
- Most wins (team): Ernie Conn (3)
- Most wins (manufacturer): Dodge, Ford (6)

Circuit information
- Surface: Asphalt
- Length: 0.402 km (0.250 mi)
- Turns: 4

The NASCAR K&N Pro Series West, previously known by other names, held several races at Stockton 99 Speedway in Stockton, California. The track hosted the series 24 times between 1966 and 2014.

== History ==
The West Series first visited Stockton 99 Speedway in 1966, when Jack McCoy drove his 1966 Dodge to the win in a 100-lap race in April and Johnny Steele won a 100-lap race in August driving a 1964 Mercury. The series continued to visit the track in various seasons between 1968 and 2014, with drivers such as Dick Bown, Jimmy Insolo, Jim Bown, Austin Cameron, and Mike David securing victories at the track.

== Past winners ==
Year	Date	No.	Driver	Team	Manufacturer	Race Distance		Race Time	Average Speed (mph)	Report	Ref
Year	Date	No.	Driver	Team	Manufacturer	Laps	Miles (km)	Race Time	Average Speed (mph)	Report	Ref
1966	April 17	7	Jack McCoy	Charles Bell	Dodge	100	25 (40.23)	0:31:00	48.387	Report	
1966	August 6	2	Johnny Steele	Kyle Gibson	Mercury	100	25 (40.23)			Report	
1967	Not held										
1968	September 22	7	Jack McCoy (2)	Charles Bell (2)	Dodge (2)	100	25 (40.23)			Report	
1969	Not held										
1970	October 10	02	Dick Bown	Mike Ober	Plymouth	150	37.5 (60.35)	0:42:57	52.386	Report	
1971	May 15	7	Jack McCoy (3)	Ernie Conn	Dodge (3)	150	37.5 (60.35)	0:43:26	51.803	Report	
1972	May 13	02	Dick Bown (2)	Mike Ober (2)	Plymouth (2)	150	37.5 (60.35)	0:40:00	56.250	Report	
1973	May 19	7	Jack McCoy (4)	Ernie Conn (2)	Dodge (4)	100	25 (40.23)	0:39:30	37.975	Report	
1974	May 3	7	Jack McCoy (5)	Ernie Conn (3)	Dodge (5)	100	25 (40.23)	0:48:30	30.927	Report	
1975 - 1977	Not held										
1978	April 28	10	Tim Williamson	Williamson Racing	Chevrolet	100	25 (40.23)	0:38:23	38.910	Report	
1979	Not held										
1980	May 17	21	Ivan Baldwin	Baldwin Engineering	Mercury (2)	200	50 (80.47)	1:04:35	46.449	Report	
1981	May 16	1	Jimmy Insolo	A.J. Kurten	Pontiac	150	37.5 (60.35)	0:47:23	47.485	Report	
1982	May 15	16	Jim Bown	Bown Racing	Buick	150	37.5 (60.35)	0:42:40	52.734	Report	
1983	May 14	98	Jim Bown (2)	Bill Morehart	Buick (2)	150	37.5 (60.35)	0:41:43	54.782	Report	
1984 - 2001	Not held										
2002	August 17	8	Johnny Borneman III	Borneman Motorsports	Ford	202*	50.5 (81.27)	1:01:52	48.976	Report	
2003	August 16	16	Austin Cameron	Bill McAnally Racing	Chevrolet (2)	207*	51.75 (83.28)	1:06:34	46.646	Report	
2004	May 29	16	Austin Cameron (2)	Bill McAnally Racing (2)	Chevrolet (3)	150	37.5 (60.35)	0:54:51	41.021	Report	
2004	August 14	2	Mike David	Randy Lynch	Ford (2)	200	50 (80.47)	1:21:09	36.969	Report	
2005	April 30	08	Scott Lynch	Winward Racing Enterprises	Dodge (6)	159*	39.75 (63.97)	0:48:58	48.707	Report	
2005	August 13	9	Mike Duncan	MB Duncan Motorsports	Chevrolet (4)	206*	51.5 (82.88)	1:16:25	40.438	Report	
2006	April 29	2	Mike David (2)	Randy Lynch (2)	Ford (3)	155*	38.75 (62.36)	1:02:32	37.180	Report	
2006	August 5	2	Mike David (3)	Randy Lynch (3)	Ford (4)	200	50 (80.47)	1:07:30	44.444	Report	
2007 - 2011	Not held										
2012	May 5	03	Dylan Kwasniewski	Gene Price Motorsports	Ford (5)	155*	38.75 (62.36)	0:59:32	39.054	Report	
2013	May 4	6	Derek Thorn	Sunrise Ford Racing	Ford (6)	150	37.5 (60.35)	1:00:05	37.448	Report	
2014	May 3	17	David Mayhew	Steve McGowan Motorsports	Chevrolet (5)	150	37.5 (60.35)	0:53:03	42.413	Report	

Notes

- 2002: Race extended from 200 to 202 laps due to green/white/checker.
- 2003: Race extended from 200 to 207 laps due to green/white/checker.
- 2005: First race extended from 150 to 159 laps and second race extended from 200 to 206 laps due to green/white/checker.
- 2006: Race extended from 150 to 155 laps due to green/white/checker.
- 2012: Race extended from 150 to 155 laps due to green/white/checker.

=== Manufacturer wins ===
# Wins	Make	Years Won
6	(United States) Dodge	1966, 1968, 1971, 1973, 1974, 2005
6	(United States) Ford	2002, 2004, 2006, 2012, 2013
5	(United States) Chevrolet	1978, 2003, 2004, 2005, 2014
2	(United States) Buick	1982, 1983
2	(United States) Plymouth	1970, 1972
1	(United States) Mercury	1966
1	(United States) Pontiac	1981
