= 1966 NASCAR Pacific Coast Late Model Division =

13th season of the NASCAR Pacific Coast Late Model Division

Seasons
- ← 1965 1967 →

The 1966 NASCAR Pacific Coast Late Model Division was the 13th season of the series. The title was won by Jack McCoy, his first in the series.

== Schedule and results ==
The 1966 season included 15 individual races, although Ascot Park hosted four races and Stockton 99 Speedway and Portland Speedway hosted two races each. The race at Riverside International Raceway was in combination with the NASCAR Grand National Series.

Date	Name	Racetrack	Location	Winner
January 23	Motor Trend 500	Riverside International Raceway	Riverside, California	Dan Gurney
April 17	†	Stockton 99 Speedway	Stockton, California	Jack McCoy
April 30	Ascot Park 200 Lappers	Ascot Park	Gardena, California	Ray Elder
May 29	†	Ascot Park	Gardena, California	Marvin Porter
June 25	Dodge Dealers of Roseburg 100	Douglas County Speedway	Roseburg, Oregon	Jack McCoy
June 26	†	Portland Speedway	Portland, Oregon	Kuzie Kuzmanich
July 3	Ascot 100	Ascot Park	Gardena, California	Scotty Cain
July 16	Orange Show 100	Orange Show Speedway	San Bernardino, California	Marvin Porter
July 31	†	Vallejo Speedway	Vallejo, California	Jack McCoy
August 6	†	Stockton 99 Speedway	Stockton, California	Johnny Steele
September 4	†	Ascot Park	Gardena, California	Marvin Porter
September 11	Altamont 100 Presented by Chevron	Altamont Motorsports Park	Tracy, California	Marvin Porter
September 18	Firestone 200	Portland Speedway	Portland, Oregon	Ray Elder
October 1	†	San Gabriel Valley Speedway	Irwindale, California	Johnny Steele
October 9	11th Annual California 100	California State Fairgrounds Race Track	Sacramento, California	Don Noel

† This race was not given a name

== Full Drivers' Championship ==
(key) Bold – Pole position awarded by time. Italics – Pole position set by owner's points. * – Most laps led. † – Finishing position unknown

Pos	Driver	RSD	S99	ASP	ASP	DCS	POR	ASP	OSS	VAL	S99	ASP	AMP	POR	SGV	CSF	Pts
1	Jack McCoy	22	1*	7	4	1*	2	6*	2	**1***	**3**	19	9	13	12	13	2552
2	Ray Elder		5	1*	8	4	5	2	17	3	2	4	14	1		15	2534
3	Johnny Steele	13	2	11	6	8	13	3	9	2	1*	5	4	5	1*	11*	2130
4	Dave James	41	12	2	3	2	16		11	4	9	2	5	16	3	12	2100
5	Scotty Cain	36	4	22	10	3	6	1	4	DNQ	12	**18**	15	3	5	2	2000
6	Marvin Porter		**3**		**1***	17	DNQ	17	**1***			1*	**1***	4	**2**	**20**	1858
7	Jerry Oliver	20	8	10	13	13	10	14				13		7	7	5	1836
8	Frank Burnett		10	12	19			13	12	9	5	9	17	8	6	22	1674
9	Jim Cook	38	6		16	11	8	**5**	14	12		6	8	17	9	9	1660
10	Ren Reugebrink			4	7			10	22	10	8	12	10		15	21	1546
11	Bruce Worrell	37			2		DNQ	11	5	5	16	20	2		6	4	1512
12	Don Noel		17	9	9				18	8	11	7			4	1	1434
13	Frank Reeder			6		18	11	12	8	13	7			10	11		1402
14	Cliff Garner	27	14	3	20	10	4	4	3	11	4	10			8		1384
15	Carl Joiner	33		5		7	**3**							12	10	7	1162
16	Ed Brown				14	9	9	16		6		3	18	6	18	17	1072
17	Hershel McGriff					15	14							**2***	17	19	702
18	Ranny Dodd					14	15									24	686
19	Ron Hornaday	10	13	14			DNQ						20		13	3	602
20	Clyde Prickett	39	15	15					21			DNQ	11		14	6	584
21	Perry Cottingham				11					20	14	8			DNQ		512
22	Vel Rogers					**16**		7		17	10		19			DNQ	454
	George Durade		16	**8**	5			8	15				7			14	
	Walt Ross			17					10	7	6	11	16				
	Dave Logan										13	15	13			8	
	Chuck Becker Jr.								7	15	15						
	Bob Link								13	19				9			
	Jim Blomgren	DNQ		13	15					18							
	Dick Bown					12	17							18		DNQ	
	Eddie Gray	32		19			DNQ					14					
	Charles Powell	44	7	18													
	Joe Clark	42	11													25	
	Kuzie Kuzmanich					6	1*										
	Harold Hardesty					5	7										
	Bill Ferrier							15	6								
	Oren Prosser			16	12												
	George Follmer				17					14							
	Walt Price	17		20								DNQ					
	Dan Gurney	1*															
	Marvin Panch												3				
	Marshall Sargent												6				
	Nat Reeder		9														
	Art Knapp							9									
	Al Pombo															10	
	Gordon Haines													11			
	Darrell Rogers						12										
	Bob McDonald												12				
	Bill Amick													14			
	Don Walker	15					DNQ										
	Jack D. McCoy						DNQ							15			
	Joe Labani									16							
	Louis Stuart														DNQ	16	
	Ken Christensen											16					
	Sam Rose								16								
	Roger Otrey											17					
	Tom Roa				18												
	Larry Burton															18	
	Jim Marine								19				DNQ			DNQ	
	John Hren								20								
	Rod Poor			21													
	Larry Hood															23	
	Jerry Johnson								23								
	Clem Proctor	24															
	Jerry Prather								24								
	Dick Guldstrand	28															
	Arley Scranton	43															
	Sam Stanley						DNQ										
