= Jerry Barnett =

American racing driver (born 1951)

- Born: December 17, 1951 (age 74); Bonita, California, U.S.

NASCAR Cup Series career
- 2 races run over 1 year
- Best finish: N/A
- First race: 1971 Winston Golden State 400 (Riverside)
- Last race: 1971 Texas 500 (Texas World)
Wins	Top tens	Poles
0	0	0

ARCA Menards Series West career
- 32 races run over 3 years
- Best finish: 8th (1971)
- First race: 1971 Orange 400 (Orange Show)
- Last race: 1976 Winston Saugus 100 (Saugus)
Wins	Top tens	Poles
0	8	0
- Statistics up to date as of October 30, 2026.

Jerry Barnett (born December 17, 1951) is an American former professional stock car racing driver. He competed in NASCAR in the early 1970s.

== Racing career ==
Barnett ran most of the 1971 NASCAR Winston West Series schedule, entering 24 of 26 races; he failed to start in the first race he made but throughout the season would score a total of eight top-tens, including a second-place finish at Saugus Speedway. He finished eighth in the standings. In contesting most of the season, Barnett attempted three NASCAR Winston Cup Series races that were in combination with the West Series, failing to qualify in his first NASCAR attempt at Ontario Motor Speedway, finishing 30th at Riverside International Raceway due to engine issues, and finishing 37th at Texas World Speedway due to a crash after 86 laps.

Barnett attempted the combination race at Ontario in 1972, where he failed to qualify. He also entered a SCCA Trans-American Championship Two-Five Challenge race at Riverside in a Ford Pinto but failed to start.

Barnett next competed in NASCAR in 1973, running eight Winston West races with a best finish of 13th at Laguna Seca Raceway.

Barnett made his final Winston West start at Saugus in 1976, where he finished fifteenth due to brake issues. He failed to qualify for his final career Winston Cup attempt in the combination race at Ontario.
