= Ross Surgenor =

Canadian racing driver (1945–2020)

- Born: April 27, 1945; Victoria, British Columbia, Canada
- Died: January 2020 (aged 74)

NASCAR Cup Series career
- 2 races run over 1 year
- Best finish: 99th (1974)
- First race: 1974 Winston Western 500 (Riverside)
- Last race: 1974 Tuborg 400 (Riverside)
Wins	Top tens	Poles
0	0	0

ARCA Menards Series West career
- 6 races run over 2 years
- Best finish: 41st (1974)
- First race: 1974 Winston Western 500 (Riverside)
- Last race: 1976 Winston Evergreen 200 (Evergreen)
Wins	Top tens	Poles
0	2	0
- Statistics up to date as of August 19, 2026.

Ross Surgenor (27 April 1945 – 2020) was a NASCAR driver from Victoria, British Columbia. He competed in two NASCAR Winston Cup Series races, both of which were in the 1974 season at Riverside International Raceway, the Winston Western 500 and Tuborg 400, finishing 12th in the Tuborg 400 in June. Surgenor also made six NASCAR Winston West Series starts from 1974 to 1976. In 1988, he was inducted into the Victoria Auto Racing Hall of Fame. Surgenor died in 2020 aged 75.
