= 1968 NASCAR Pacific Coast Late Model Division =

15th season of the NASCAR Pacific Coast Late Model Division

Seasons
- ← 1967 1969 →

The 1968 NASCAR Pacific Coast Late Model Division was the 15th season of the series. The title was won by Scotty Cain, his second in succession.

== Schedule and results ==
The 1968 season included 20 individual races, although Ascot Park and Evergreen Speedway hosted two races each. The race at Riverside International Raceway was in combination with the NASCAR Grand National Series.

Date	Name	Racetrack	Location	Winner
January 21	Motor Trend 500	Riverside International Raceway	Riverside, California	Dan Gurney
April 21	†	Ascot Park	Gardena, California	Ray Elder
May 18	†	Kearney Bowl	Fresno, California	Harold Hardesty
May 19	Vallejo 150	Vallejo Speedway	Vallejo, California	Scotty Cain
May 29	Ascot 100	Ascot Park	Gardena, California	Ray Elder
June 23	†	Altamont Speedway	Livermore, California	Jack McCoy
June 29	†	Douglas County Speedway	Roseburg, Oregon	Johnny Steele
June 30	†	Portland Speedway	Portland, Oregon	Jack McCoy
July 4	†	Evergreen Speedway	Monroe, Washington	Jack McCoy
July 6	†	Eugene Speedway	Eugene, Oregon	Jack McCoy
July 7	†	Medford Speedway	Medford, Oregon	Clyde Prickett
August 3	Orange Show 100	Orange Show Speedway	San Bernardino, California	Don Noel
August 17	†	Tri-City Raceway	West Richland, Washington	Ray Elder
August 31	†	Yakima Speedway	Yakima, Washington	Dave James
September 2	†	Evergreen Speedway	Monroe, Washington	Jack McCoy
September 13	†	Eureka Speedway	Eureka, California	Harold Hardesty
September 21	†	Bakersfield Speedway	Oildale, California	Ray Elder
September 22	†	Stockton 99 Speedway	Stockton, California	Jack McCoy
September 27	†	Clovis Speedway	Clovis, California	Ray Elder
October 19	Saugus 100	Saugus Speedway	Saugus, California	Ron Hornaday

† This race was not given a name

== Full Drivers' Championship ==
(key) Bold – Pole position awarded by time. Italics – Pole position set by owner's points. * – Most laps led. † – Finishing position unknown

Pos	Driver	RSD	ASP	KEA	VAL	ASP	AMP	DCS	POR	EVG	EUG	MED	OSS	TCR	YAK	EVG	EUR	BKS	S99	CSP	SGS	Pts
1	Scotty Cain	4 (Note: Finished 9th overall)	16	4	1*	12	5	6	3	8	9	4	11	11	2		6	5	3	3	3	1051
2	Ray Elder	15 (Note: Finished 30th overall)	1	2	**18**	**1***	2	3	2	15	5	5	4	1*	7	8	3	1	5	1*	5	1049
3	Jim Cook	5 (Note: Finished 11th overall)	2	5	6	10	3	17	6	10	8	6	12	3	3	9	9	6	9	5	10	1030
4	Paul Dorrity	18 (Note: Finished 33rd overall)	6	3	14	13	4	7	12	7	16	10	7	2	9		8	8	4	9	6	985
5	Johnny Steele	16 (Note: Finished 31st overall)	4*	11	17	3	7	1	14	20	2	8	13	17	10	10	11	7	20	12	12	941
6	Sam Rose	10 (Note: Finished 18th overall)	9	16	13	19	9	13	18	11	19	16	8	6	12		7	14	16	14	4	933
7	Clyde Prickett	6 (Note: Finished 14th overall)	20	12	12	2	14	4	4	19	4	1	DNQ	7		14		9	6	16		902
8	Jack McCoy	7 (Note: Finished 15th overall)			3	4	**1***	**5**	**1***	**1***	**1***	3		19	14	1		**2***	**1***	**2**		889
9	Harold Hardesty	12 (Note: Finished 24th overall)	**8**	**1***	2		15	11	11	3	6	**2**	DNQ	12		3	**1***	13	DNQ	13		723
10	Bob Link	20 (Note: Finished 38th overall)	19	10	9	7	8	12		9					8						7	631
11	Cliff Garner		12					14	9	2	3	17	**2**	15	6	**2**	2	3	2	8		625
12	Dave James	3 (Note: Finished 8th overall)				5		2	13	22	22	18	3	4	**1***	11			22			611
13	Ed Brown	11 (Note: Finished 21st overall)		18				9	7	5	13	11		14		5		12	10	7		504
14	Bob England		11	8	7	11		21					DNQ				5		15	10	9	491
15	Fred Hunt			7	4	20	16	16	10	6	11	7	18			6			13			447
16	Don Noel	17 (Note: Finished 32nd overall)	15							13	7	9	1*				10			4	11	441
17	Walt Ross		22	17	10		10				17	15										270
18	Bo Reeder	21 (Note: Finished 40th overall)	13	14	15	16	DNQ					DNQ	17		17							202
19	Rod Poor			13				15	8		14	14										197
20	Bill Small	19 (Note: Finished 36th overall)				9							6								2	194
	Frank James	13 (Note: Finished 26th overall)	14	9	11	14	11	10	19	4	12	12	DNQ	**5**	4	4		4	7	6		
	Frank Burnett	9 (Note: Finished 17th overall)	3	15	8	8	6						15					10	8	11		
	Pat Patrick			6	5		13				18	13						15	21	17		
	Chuck Becker Jr.												5	9	13				14	18	8	
	Roger Parr					15	12	18	17	21									18			
	Don Walker									12	10		9	16		15						
	Carl Joiner								21		24			10	5	7						
	Fred Hay									16				13	11	13						
	George Wiltshire	DNQ			16						23			18	15							
	Hank Dekker Jr.	DNQ					DNQ	19	20	17	21		DNQ									
	Kuzie Kuzmanich							8	5	18												
	Hershel McGriff								15									16	12			
	Joe Clark	22 (Note: Finished 44th overall)	18			6																
	Bill Ferrier		21										DNQ					17	11			
	John Langdon							20	22		20											
	Bob Britt																4	11				
	Wendell Parnell		7										14									
	Bruce Beers									14						12						
	Tom Moore		DNQ			18							10						DNQ			
	Guy Jones	8 (Note: Finished 16th overall)				21																
	Bill Amick								16		15											
	Jack Jeffery														16	16						
	Vel Rogers																	18	17			
	Chuck Prickett									23					17							
	Ron Hornaday																				1	
	Dan Gurney	**1***																				
	Parnelli Jones	2 (Note: Finished 3rd overall)																				
	Marty Kinerk		5																			
	Dick Bown													8								
	Robert Hale		10																			
	Dick Guest																				13	
	Vallie Engelauf	14 (Note: Finished 29th overall)																				
	Jim Wright																			15		
	Ranny Dodd												16									
	Bill Meyer		DNQ			17																
	Les Cooper		17																			
	Andy Anderson														18							
	Chuck Kimmer																		19			
	Neil Castles	DNQ																				
	Wendell Scott	DNQ																				
	Bobby Wawak	DNQ																				
	Bobby Mausgrover	DNQ																				
	Red Ames									QL												
