= Don Noel =

American racing driver (born 1929)

- Born: June 29, 1929 (age 97); Arleta, California, U.S.
- Awards: West Coast Stock Car Hall of Fame (2006)

NASCAR Cup Series career
- 24 races run over 13 years
- Best finish: 65th (1961)
- First race: 1960 Copper Cup 100 (Phoenix)
- Last race: 1979 Winston Western 500 (Riverside)
Wins	Top tens	Poles
0	4	0

ARCA Menards Series West career
- 137 races run over 18 years
- Best finish: 2nd (1960)
- First race: 1960 Race 1 (Gardena)
- Last race: 1979 Winston Western 500 (Riverside)
- First win: 1960 Race 15 (Balboa)
- Last win: 1968 Orange Show 100 (Orange Show)
Wins	Top tens	Poles
7	71	10
- Statistics up to date as of September 14, 2026.

Don Noel (born June 29, 1929) is an American former professional stock car racing driver. He competed in the NASCAR Winston Cup Series and NASCAR Winston West Series between 1960 and 1979.

== Racing career ==
Noel began racing jalopies in the mid 1950s. Noel competed in a NASCAR Modified National Championship race at Gardena Stadium in 1955, finishing sixteenth. Noel competed in at least eleven NASCAR Pacific Coast Late Model Division races in 1960, scoring a win at Balboa Stadium and at least seven top-tens. He finished second in the standings. This schedule included three combination races with the NASCAR Grand National Series, where he scored a fifth place finish at Marchbanks Speedway.

Noel competed in at least 12 Pacific Coast Late Model races in 1961, scoring at least five top-tens. Four of these races were in combination with the Grand National Series, where he finished top-five in three of them, including two runner-up finishes.

Noel ran at least nine of ten Pacific Coast Late Model races in 1962, winning the season opener at Ascot Park and scoring five top-tens. He also competed in the first four races of the USAC Stock Car Series season, scoring two top-tens.

Noel is known to have competed in all ten races in 1963, scoring wins at Ascot Park and Salem Speedway and finishing second at Manzanita Speedway. In the combination races at Riverside International Raceway, he finished 30th and 17th.

In Noel's four known Pacific Coast Late Model starts in 1964, he won at Clovis Speedway. He finished 40th in the combination race at Riverside.

Noel's only known appearances of 1965 came at Ascot Park, failing to start and being scored 27th his first appearance and finishing in an unknown position later in the season. He finished seventh in a USAC Stock Car race at Marchbanks Speedway.

In nine Pacific Coast Late Model races in 1966, Noel scored six top-tens, including winning the season finale at the California State Fairgrounds Race Track.

He ran fourteen of nineteen races in 1967, scoring eleven top-tens. He finished seventeenth in the combination race at Riverside.

In nine Pacific Coast Late Model races in 1968, Noel scored five top-tens, including his final career win at Orange Show Speedway. He finished 32nd in the combination race at Riverside due to engine issues. He would score a sixth-place finish in the USAC Stock Car season opener at the Phoenix International Raceway road course.

Noel ran thirteen Pacific Coast Late Model races in 1969, scoring nine top-tens.

He attempted eleven races in the renamed Grand National West in 1970, failing to qualify at Ascot Park and scoring seven top-tens, including four runner-up finishes. He would finish 38th and 33rd in the Riverside combination races. Noel finished nineteenth in a USAC Stock Car race at Phoenix.

Noel ran twelve races in the renamed Winston West Series in 1971, scoring five top-tens. He would finish 33rd and fifteenth in the combination races at Riverside and 44th in the combination race at Ontario Motor Speedway.

Noel ran thirteen Winston West races in 1972, scoring five top-tens. He finished sixteenth in the first Riverside combination race and failed to qualify for the second; he finished 48th in the Ontario combination race.

Noel made only one Winston West start in 1973, finishing 19th at Altamont Speedway. In the Winston Cup Tuborg 400 at Riverside, he finished 23rd.

In two Winston West starts in 1974, Noel finished twentieth and 24th. He failed to qualify for the Winston Cup finale at Ontario. He made a NASCAR Late Model Sportsman National Championship start at Riverside in 1975, finishing 12th.

Noel returned to the Winston West Series in 1977, scoring his final career top-ten, top-five, and pole during his four starts. He failed to qualify for two Winston Cup combination races, the season opener at Riverside and season finale at Ontario; he finished 35th in the second Riverside race due to transmission issues on the first lap.

Noel's lone Winston West start of 1978 came at Ontario, where he finished 28th in a combination race. He did not run for West points in the second Riverside combination race and finished 33rd. He finished 25th in a USAC Stock Car race at Ontario due to rear end issues.

He simultaneously made his final Winston West and Winston Cup start in the 1979 Winston Western 500 at Riverside, finishing 31st. He also made is final USAC Stock Car start on Ontario, finishing eleventh.

Noel ran the Copper World Classic at Phoenix in 1981 and 1982, finishing fifth and ninth respectively. His last recorded race start was the 1983 Warner W. Hodgdon 300, a NASCAR Grand American Stock Car National Championship race at Riverside, where he finished eighth.
