= Marvin Porter =

American racing driver (1924–2002)

- Born: April 3, 1924; Lakewood, California, U.S.
- Died: November 4, 2002 (aged 78); El Centro, California, U.S.

NASCAR Cup Series career
- 34 races run over 8 years
- Best finish: 34th (1957)
- First race: 1957 Race 18 (Portland)
- Last race: 1967 Motor Trend 500 (Riverside)
- First win: 1957 Race 44 (Santa Clara)
- Last win: 1960 California 250 (Marchbanks)
Wins	Top tens	Poles
2	12	0

ARCA Menards Series West career
- 87 races run over 11 years
- Best finish: 1st (1960)
- First race: 1957 Race 7 (Portland)
- Last race: 1967 Race 19 (Clovis)
- First win: 1957 Race 24 (Santa Clara)
- Last win: 1966 Altamont 100 Presented by Chevron (Altamont)
Wins	Top tens	Poles
12	63	11
- Statistics up to date as of October 16, 2026.

Marvin Porter (April 3, 1924 – November 4, 2002) was an American professional stock car racing driver who raced in NASCAR, mainly focusing on the West Coast. Porter won the 1960 West Coast Late Model championship, now known as the ARCA Menards Series West. He won two NASCAR Cup Series races, one in 1957 driving a self-owned No. 12 '57 Ford, and the other in 1960, completing a 1-2 finish for owner Vel Militich.
