= West Series races at Portland Speedway =

NASCAR Winston West Series races at Portland Speedway

NASCAR Winston West races at Portland Speedway
NASCAR Winston West Series
- Venue: Portland Speedway
- Location: Portland, Oregon, United States
- First race: 1956
- Last race: 2000
- Distance: 50 mi (80.467 km) (1957, 1964, 1967-1969, 1971-1979); 50.5 mi (81.272 km) (1951); 75 mi (120.701 km) (1956-1957, 1964-1966, 1975-1977, 1981, 1983-1984); 100 mi (160.934 km) (1956-1957, 1964-1966, 1972-1974, 1980, 1987-2000); 100.5 mi (161.739 km) (1985); 123 mi (197.949 km) (1956); 125 mi (201.168 km) (1956, 1964, 1995)
- Laps: 100 (1957, 1964, 1967-1969, 1971-1979); 101 (1965); 150 (1956-1957, 1964-1966, 1975-1977, 1981-1982, 1984); 200 (1956-1957, 1964-1966, 1972-1974, 1980, 1987-2000); 201 (1984); 246 (1956); 250 (1956, 1964, 1995)
- Previous names: First races No name (1956-1957, 1964-1969); Rose City 100 (1971); Portland 100 (1972-1973); Pepsi 100 (1974); Coca-Cola 100 (1975, 1978); Winston Portland 100 (1976-1977); Kyte Coca-Cola 100 (1979); G.I. Joe's Heidelberg Portland 200 (1980); G.I. Joe's Portland 150 (1981); Winston Portland 150 (1982); Winston / Permatex 150 (1984); G.I. Joe's / Valvoline 201 (1985); Mike's Auto Parts / Winston 200 (1987); Winston 200 (1988-1991); Astro 200 by Safeway / Diane's Foods (1992); Mello Yello 200 by Safeway (1993); Talk 'N Toss 200 (1994); Reser's Fine Foods 200 (1995); Reser's Fine Foods 200 by Action Auto Glass (1996); Pontiac Widetrack 200 (1997); TCI Digital Cable 200 (1998); Grainger Industrial Supply 200 Pres. by TCI (1999); NAPA Auto Parts 200 (2000); Second races No name (1956-1957); Portland 150 Laps (1964); Portland 150 (1965); Firestone 200 (1966); Portland 200 (1972-1973); Pepsi 200 (1974); Coca-Cola 150 (1975); Winston Portland 150 (1976-1978); Rose City Winston 100 (1979); Plaid Pantry 250 (1995); Third races No name (1956-1957, 1965); Portland 200 (1964); Fourth races No name (1956, 1964)
- Most wins (driver): Hershel McGriff (5)
- Most wins (manufacturer): Chevrolet (16)

Circuit information
- Surface: Asphalt (1956-1999); Clay (2000)
- Turns: 4

The NASCAR Winston West Series, now the ARCA Menards Series West, held several races at Portland Speedway in Portland, Oregon. The track hosted four races for the series in 1956 and 1964, three in 1957 and 1965, and two in many years, with a 4th of July race being held in 12 different seasons.

== Past winners ==
Year	Date	Driver	Manufacturer	Race distance		Race time	Average speed (mph)
Year	Date	Driver	Manufacturer	Laps	Miles (km)	Race time	Average speed (mph)
1956	May 27	Herb Thomas	Chrysler	150	75 (120.701)	1:10:31	63.815
1956	June 24	Johnny Kieper	Oldsmobile	200	100 (160.934)	1:35:52	62.586
1956	August 26	Royce Hagerty	Dodge	246	123 (197.949)		
1956	September 23	Lloyd Dane	Ford	250	125 (201.168)		
1957	April 28	Art Watts	Ford (2)	100	50 (80.467)	0:46:20	64.754
1957	May 26	Eddie Pagan	Ford (3)	150	75 (120.701)	1:09:31	64.732
1957	July 14	Eddie Pagan (2)	Ford (4)	200	100 (160.934)	1:32:58	64.539
1958: 1963	Not held						
1964	March 29	Bill Amick	Mercury	100	50 (80.467)		
1964	May 24	Bill Amick (2)	Mercury (2)	150	75 (120.701)		
1964	June 21	Ron Hornaday	Ford (5)	200	100 (160.934)		
1964	September 27	Jack D. McCoy	Dodge (2)	250	125 (201.168)		
1965	April 4	Bill Amick (3)	Mercury (3)	101	50.5 (81.271)		
1965	May 16	Bill Amick (4)	Mercury (4)	150	75 (120.701)	1:12:15	62.284
1965	June 27	Bill Amick (5)	Mercury (5)	200	100 (160.934)		
1966	June 26	Kuzie Kuzmanich	Pontiac	150	75 (120.701)		
1966	September 18	Ray Elder	Dodge (3)	200	100 (160.934)		
1967	May 14	Scotty Cain	Ford (6)	100	50 (80.467)		
1968	June 30	Jack McCoy	Dodge (4)	100	50 (80.467)		
1969	September 7	Scotty Cain (2)	Ford (7)	100	50 (80.467)	0:48:00	
1970	Not held						
1971	July 11	Hershel McGriff	Plymouth	100	50 (80.467)	0:40:29	74.104
1972	June 25	Hershel McGriff (2)	Plymouth (2)	100	50 (80.467)	1:10:00	42.857
1972	September 10	Hershel McGriff (3)	Plymouth (3)	200	100 (160.934)	1:17:16	77.653
1973	July 1	Hershel McGriff (4)	Plymouth (4)	100	50 (80.467)	1:05:23	54.167
1973	September 9	Hershel McGriff (5)	Plymouth (5)	200	100 (160.934)		
1974	July 4	Jimmy Insolo	Chevrolet	100	50 (80.467)	1:15:29	39.743
1974	September 8	Jimmy Insolo (2)	Chevrolet (2)	200	100 (160.934)	1:55:00	52.173
1975	July 4	Ernie Stierly	Chevrolet (3)	100	50 (80.467)	0:50:52	58.977
1975	September 7	Bill Schmitt	Chevrolet (4)	150	75 (120.701)	1:13:00	61.643
1976	July 4	Ernie Stierly (2)	Chevrolet (5)	100	50 (80.467)	0:39:56	76.923
1976	September 12	Harry Jefferson	Ford (8)	150	75 (120.701)	1:01:52	72.737
1977	July 4	Chuck Bown	Chevrolet (6)	100	50 (80.467)	0:43:17	69.313
1977	September 11	Art Roth	Chevrolet (7)	150	75 (120.701)	1:05:00	69.230
1978	July 4	Bill Schmitt (2)	Pontiac (2)	100	50 (80.467)	0:42:16	70.977
1979	July 4	Roy Smith	Pontiac (3)	100	50 (80.467)	0:55:03	54.488
1979	September 3	Ron Eaton	Pontiac (4)	100	50 (80.467)	0:42:28	70.635
1980	August 10	Bobby Allison	Pontiac (5)	200	100 (160.934)	1:19:40	75.314
1981	July 5	Jim Robinson	Oldsmobile (2)	150	75 (120.701)	0:58:01	77.564
1982	July 4	Ron Eaton (2)	Buick	150	75 (120.701)	0:57:36	78.125
1983	Not held						
1984	July 15	Derrike Cope	Ford (9)	150	75 (120.701)	1:02:06	72.464
1985	July 4	Jim Bown	Chevrolet (8)	201	100.5 (161.739)	1:25:32	70.225
1986	Not held						
1987	August 2	Chad Little	Ford (10)	200	100 (160.934)	1:32:15	65.040
1988	July 10	Derrike Cope (2)	Chevrolet (9)	200	100 (160.934)	1:34:48	69.659
1989	July 4	Bill Schmitt (3)	Chevrolet (10)	200	100 (160.934)	1:31:01	63.818
1990	July 1	Roy Smith (2)	Ford (11)	200	100 (160.934)	1:45:21	56.953
1991	June 30	Mike Chase	Buick (2)	200	100 (160.934)	1:32:03	65.005
1992	June 28	Bill Sedgwick	Chevrolet (11)	200	100 (160.934)	1:53:13	52.995
1993	July 4	Ken Schrader	Chevrolet (12)	200	100 (160.934)	1:25:34	70.121
1994	July 3	Rick Carelli	Chevrolet (13)	200	100 (160.934)	1:45:38	56.800
1995	July 4	Ernie Cope	Chevrolet (14)	200	100 (160.934)	1:45:39	56.791
1995	September 17	Doug George	Ford (12)	250	125 (201.168)	2:05:04	59.968
1996	June 1	Lance Hooper	Pontiac (6)	200	100 (160.934)	1:31:55	65.277
1997	July 11	Butch Gilliland	Ford (13)	200	100 (160.934)	1:44:03	57.665
1998	July 10	Gary Smith	Chevrolet (15)	200	100 (160.934)	1:23:36	71.770
1999	August 14	Bill Sedgwick (2)	Chevrolet (16)	200	100 (160.934)	1:52:02	53.555
2000	July 4	Jeff Jefferson	Ford (14)	200	100 (160.934)	1:35:40	62.718
