= Jack McCoy (racing driver, born 1937) =

American racing driver (1937–2009)

- Born: Jack Eldredge McCoy; March 29, 1937; Los Angeles, California, U.S.
- Died: April 14, 2009 (aged 72); Modesto, California, U.S.
- Achievements: NASCAR Winston West Series champion (1966, 1973)
- Awards: West Coast Stock Car Hall of Fame (2002 - Inaugural Class)

NASCAR Cup Series career
- 19 races run over 9 years
- Best finish: 50th (1973)
- First race: 1966 Motor Trend 500 (Riverside)
- Last race: 1974 Los Angeles Times 500 (Ontario)
Wins	Top tens	Poles
0	5	0

ARCA Menards Series West career
- 208 races run over 12 years
- Best finish: 1st (1966, 1973)
- First race: 1963 Race 4 (Salem)
- Last race: 1974 Los Angeles Times 500 (Ontario)
- First win: 1966 Race 2 (Stockton)
- Last win: 1974 Las Vegas 150 (Craig Road)
Wins	Top tens	Poles
54	151	58
- Statistics up to date as of October 23, 2026.

Jack Eldredge McCoy (March 29, 1937 – April 14, 2009) was an American professional stock car racing driver. He was a notable competitor in the NASCAR Winston West Series, scoring 54 wins, the most in the series, and winning the series championship twice, in 1966 and 1973.

== Racing career ==
McCoy is known to have made a start in the IMCA Stock Car Series in 1958, finishing sixth at the Iowa State Fair Speedway. He finished 69th in the NASCAR Short Track Division standings in 1959.

McCoy began competing in the NASCAR Pacific Coast Late Model Division in 1964, running six races. He ran 13 of the 14 races in 1965, scoring eight top tens. He also competed in a USAC Stock Car Series race at Hanford Motor Speedway, finishing seventeenth.

McCoy ran his first full-time Pacific Coast Late Model season in 1966, scoring three wins and eight top-tens. He won the championship by 18 points over Ray Elder. This season included his first NASCAR Grand National Series start, coming at Riverside International Raceway, where he finished 22nd.

McCoy ran fifteen of nineteen Pacific Coast Late Model races in 1967, scoring four wins and 11 top-tens. In the Grand National race at Riverside, he failed to finish, being scored 25th due a differential issue.

In 1968, McCoy again competed in 15 Pacific Coast Late Model races, scoring six wins and 12 top-tens, all of which were top-fives. He finished 15th of 44 cars in the Grand National race at Riverside despite engine issues taking him out of the race after 118 of 186 laps.

McCoy ran his second full-time Pacific Coast Late Model Division season in 1969, scoring nine wins and 16 top-ten finishes, ultimately finishing second in the standings. As in previous years, McCoy competed in the combination race with the Grand National Series at Riverside, finishing 35th; McCoy finished seventh in the 1969 Texas 500, which was also a combination race and the season finale for both series.

McCoy ran in the renamed Grand National West Series full-time in 1970, where he scored five wins and sixteen top-tens across 19 races, again finishing second in the standings. The series had two combination races at Riverside in 1970, where McCoy finished 13th and sixth.

In 1971, McCoy ran all but the final race in the renamed Winston West Series, scoring four wins and 16 top-tens, finishing second in points for the third year in a row. The series had three combination races, two at Riverside and one at Ontario Motor Speedway; McCoy failed to finish the Riverside races and finished 13th at Ontario. He was also scheduled to compete at Texas World Speedway for the first time since his 1969 top-ten, but was replaced by Jerry Barnett.

McCoy contested the full 30-race Winston West schedule in 1972, scoring six wins and nineteen top-tens. He finished fourth in the standings. McCoy finished 36th and 38th in the Riverside combination races due to issues, but would finish 12th at Ontario.

In 1973, McCoy had his most impressive West season of his career, scoring 11 wins, 15 top-fives, 17 top-tens, and 11 poles. He won his second and final career West title. He did this despite not competing in the season finale, being replaced by Dick Bown.

McCoy also had his best Winston Cup points finish of 50th after finishing sixth and ninth in the combination races at Riverside as well as scoring his only career Cup top-five at Martinsville Speedway with a fifth-place result.

McCoy's final season in NASCAR was 1974. In 28 races, McCoy scored six wins and 19 top-tens. He ended his final season second in the standings. In his final Cup starts, mechanical failures prevented him from finishing any of the three combination races, with a best result of 21st in the first Riverside race.

McCoy ended his career with a record 54 West Series wins, and as many as 58 poles, also a record, although sources vary on the exact number. He was inducted to the West Coast Stock Car/Motorsports Hall of Fame in 2002 and named as one of the top ten West Series drivers of all time in 2005.

== Personal life ==
McCoy was born in Los Angeles, California on March 29, 1937, although his date of birth has also been listed as March 24, 1938. McCoy attended Turlock High School and Modesto Junior College. He was married to Peggy Joyce McCoy, and the couple had seven children. He owned his own tire shop.

== Death ==
McCoy died in a Modesto, California hospital on April 14, 2009, aged 72.
