= Jimmy Insolo =

American racing driver (born 1943)

- Born: February 4, 1943 (age 83); Mission Hills, California, U.S.
- Achievements: 1978 NASCAR Winston West Series Champion
- Awards: West Coast Stock Car Hall of Fame (2002 - Inaugural Class); 1976, 1978, 1979 NASCAR Winston West Series Most Popular Driver

NASCAR Cup Series career
- 39 races run over 13 years
- Best finish: 49th (1978)
- First race: 1970 Motor Tend 500 (Riverside)
- Last race: 1983 Winston Western 500 (Riverside)
Wins	Top tens	Poles
0	8	0

ARCA Menards Series West career
- 164 races run over 16 years
- Best finish: 1st (1978)
- First race: 1970 Motor Trend 500 (Riverside)
- Last race: 1986 Motorcraft 300 (Portland)
- First win: 1971 Vegas 150 (Craig Road)
- Last win: 1981 Stockton Winston 150 (Stockton)
Wins	Top tens	Poles
25	102	11
- Statistics up to date as of February 13, 2026.

James Edward Insolo (born February 4, 1943) is an American NASCAR Winston Cup Series driver whose career spanned from 1970 to 1983.

== Career ==
Insolo began his career at Saugus Speedway, where he became one of the top drivers at the track. In addition to his Winston Cup Series starts, Insolo would make 129 appearances in a Chevrolet vehicle in the Winston West division of NASCAR. Insolo finished an average of 21st place after starting an average of thirteenth. His only DNQ came at the 1972 Miller High Life 500. Insolo's total earnings as a driver were $59,785 ($193,257.56 when adjusted for inflation). One of his famous races involved Insolo racing at the Westwood Motorsport Park (now developed into the Westwood Plateau neighborhood along with the Westwood Plateau Golf & Country Club).

Before Insolo stepped onto the NASCAR scene, very few West Coast drivers had any level of success in NASCAR. Drivers from that part of the United States were forced by necessity to race in the specially designated Winston West Series. Racing in the Southeastern United States back in the early days of NASCAR was a financially unsustainable activity that brought about meager amounts of money that probably couldn't feed the family or pay the bills back then. The multimillion-dollar purses that make up the basis for today's NASCAR Cup Series races didn't appear until at least the 1980s. For example, the 1955 Southern 500, one of the highest paying events prior to the inaugural running of the Daytona 500 paid only $50 as its lowest prize ($600.93 when adjusted for inflation).

Insolo would race in the days before Kevin Harvick, Ron Hornaday, and Kurt Busch made NASCAR into a household name west of the Mississippi River. Derrike Cope, Ernie Irvan, and Chad Little would become a few of his "West Coast" contemporaries. After racing the equivalent of 7,199.2 miles (11,586.0 km) and leading 24 laps out of 2804, Insolo would retire from his NASCAR career. He was the 1978 NASCAR Winston West Series champion.

== Awards ==
Insolo was inducted in the West Coast Stock Car Hall of Fame in its first class (2002).

Sporting positions
Preceded by Bill Schmitt	NASCAR Winston West Series champion 1978	Succeeded by Bill Schmitt
