= Orange Show Speedway =

Race track in San Bernardino, California

- Location: 689 South 'E' Street, San Bernardino, California 92408
- Coordinates: 34°5′12.55″N 117°17′33.29″W
- Capacity: 8,500
- Owner: Orange Show Speedway
- Operator: Robert Snider
- Opened: 1947
- Major events: Former: NASCAR K&N Pro Series West (1966–1973, 1978, 2016–2018); NASCAR Southwest Series (1986–1997)
- Website: www.orangeshowspeedway.org

Oval (1947–present)
- Surface: Asphalt
- Length: 0.402 km (0.250 mi)
- Turns: 4
- Banking: 10+ degrees

Orange Show Speedway is a race track in San Bernardino, California. It is a 0.250 mi (0.402 km) in length. Opened in 1947, it is said to be the longest continually running racetrack in the west coast of United States of America.

The track hosts various stock car divisions including Late Models, Street Stock, Mini Stock, Figure 8, Open Comp, Bandolero, Barber Pole, Skid Plate, and Legends.

The track hosted 10 races of NASCAR Winston West Series between 1963 and 1978. Then after 37 years absence, the series returned to Orange Show Speedway in 2016 and ran 3 races between 2016 and 2018.

Orange Show Speedway also hosted 16 NASCAR Southwest Series events between 1986 and 1997.
