= List of NASCAR race wins by Petty Enterprises =

Petty Enterprises was an American professional stock car racing team that competed in the NASCAR Cup Series. The team, created in 1949 by owner-driver Lee Petty, became the most successful team of the first 50 years of NASCAR. Competing primarily in the Cup Series, the team won 10 Cup Series owners and drivers championships and amassed 268 NASCAR Cup victories, along with 2 Truck Series wins and 3 ARCA Racing Series victories.

Although primarily fielding cars for Lee Petty, Richard Petty, and Kyle Petty, others who drove for the team included Jim Paschal, Buddy Baker, Pete Hamilton, Jimmy Hensley, Bobby Hamilton, John Andretti, Marvin Panch, Jeff Green, and Bobby Labonte. Petty Enterprises scored its last Cup Series win in 1999 and closed after the 2008 season, merging operations with Evernham Motorsports to become Richard Petty Motorsports.

== Grand National/Winston Cup Series ==
Lee Petty competed in the inaugural series race in 1949, crashing out after completing half distance. Lee went on to win 54 races from 1949 to 1961, including the inaugural Daytona 500 in 1959. Richard Petty won 200 races from 1960 to 1984. Of those, 196 wins came with Petty Enterprises, mainly in the No. 43 but also in Nos. 41 and 42 from 1962 to 1966. Petty ran two dirt races for owner Don Robertson in 1970 at Columbia Speedway and North Carolina State Fairgrounds as part of a deal with Petty Enterprises, winning both starts. He moved to newly-formed Curb Racing for 1984 and 1985, winning his last two career races during the 1984 season. After 1983, the team went winless in the series until 1996, when Bobby Hamilton found victory lane. The last two wins for the team came in 1997 with Hamilton and 1999 with John Andretti.

. – Petty Enterprises won driver's championship

NASCAR Cup Series victories
No.	Date	Season	Car #	Driver	Race	Track	Location
1	October 2	1949	42	Lee Petty	1949-07	Heidelberg Raceway	Pittsburgh, Pennsylvania
2	October 29	1950	42	Lee Petty	1950-19	Occoneechee Speedway	Hillsborough, North Carolina
3	July 31	1951	42	Lee Petty	1951-18	Monroe County Fairgrounds	Rochester, New York
4	July 11	1952	42	Lee Petty	1952-21	Morristown Speedway	Morristown, New Jersey
5	September 7	1952	42	Lee Petty	1952-26	Central City Speedway	Macon, Georgia
6	September 14	1952	42	Lee Petty	1952-27	Langhorne Speedway	Langhorne, Pennsylvania
7	February 1	1953	42	Lee Petty	1953-01	Palm Beach Speedway	Palm Beach, Florida
8	April 19	1953	42	Lee Petty	Richmond 200	Atlantic Rural Exposition Fairgrounds	Richmond, Virginia
9	May 17	1953	42	Lee Petty	1953-11	Martinsville Speedway	Ridgeway, Virginia
10	June 7	1953	42	Lee Petty	1953-14	Louisiana Fairgrounds	Shreveport, Louisiana
11	July 4	1953	42	Lee Petty	1953-20	Piedmont Interstate Fairgrounds	Spartanburg, South Carolina
12	February 21	1954	42	Lee Petty	1954-02	Daytona Beach and Road Course	Daytona Beach, Florida
13	May 23	1954	42	Lee Petty	1954-13	Sharon Speedway	Hartford, Ohio
14	June 25	1954	42	Lee Petty	1954-20	Monroe County Fairgrounds	Rochester, New York
15	July 11	1954	42	Lee Petty	1954-25	Grand Rapids Speedrome	Grand Rapids, Michigan
16	August 13	1954	42	Lee Petty	1954-28	Southern States Fairgrounds	Charlotte, North Carolina
17	August 29	1954	42	Lee Petty	1954-30	Corbin Speedway	Corbin, Kentucky
18	October 17	1954	42	Lee Petty	1954-36	Martinsville Speedway	Ridgeway, Virginia
19	November 7, 1954	1955	42	Lee Petty	1955-01	Tri-City Speedway	High Point, North Carolina
20	February 13	1955	42	Lee Petty	1955-03	Speedway Park	Jacksonville, Florida
21	March 6	1955	42	Lee Petty	1955-05	Oglethorpe Speedway	Pooler, Georgia
22	May 29	1955	42	Lee Petty	1955-18	Forsyth County Fairgrounds	Winston-Salem, North Carolina
23	June 19	1955	42	Lee Petty	1955-22	Airborne Speedway	Plattsburgh, New York
24	August 7	1955	42	Lee Petty	1955-32	Forsyth County Fairgrounds	Winston-Salem, North Carolina
25	July 1	1956	42	Lee Petty	1956-29	Asheville-Weaverville Speedway	Weaverville, North Carolina
26	July 7	1956	42	Lee Petty	1956-31	Piedmont Interstate Fairgrounds	Spartanburg, South Carolina
27	June 29	1957	42	Lee Petty	1957-26	Piedmont Interstate Fairgrounds	Spartanburg, South Carolina
28	August 16	1957	42	Lee Petty	1957-38	Old Bridge Stadium	Old Bridge, New Jersey
29	September 8	1957	42	Lee Petty	1957-42	Asheville-Weaverville Speedway	Weaverville, North Carolina
30	October 5	1957	42	Lee Petty	1957-48	Southern States Fairgrounds	Charlotte, North Carolina
31	March 2	1958	42	Lee Petty	1958-03	Concord Speedway	Concord, North Carolina
32	March 16	1958	42	Lee Petty	1958-05	Wilson Speedway	Wilson, North Carolina
33	June 25	1958	42	Lee Petty	1958-25	Lincoln Speedway	New Oxford, Pennsylvania
34	June 28	1958	42	Lee Petty	Buddy Shuman 250	Hickory Speedway	Hickory, North Carolina
35	July 18	1958	42	Lee Petty	Jim Mideon 500	Canadian Exposition Stadium	Toronto, Ontario
36	August 22	1958	42	Lee Petty	1958-39	Bowman Gray Stadium	Winston-Salem, North Carolina
37	October 5	1958	42	Lee Petty	1958-48	Salisbury Speedway	Salisbury, North Carolina
38	February 22	1959	42	Lee Petty	Daytona 500	Daytona International Speedway	Daytona Beach, Florida
39	April 5	1959	43	Lee Petty	Gwyn Staley 160	North Wilkesboro Speedway	North Wilkesboro, North Carolina
40	May 3	1959	42	Lee Petty	Virginia 500	Martinsville Speedway	Ridgeway, Virginia
41	May 22	1959	42	Lee Petty	1959-15	Southern States Fairgrounds	Charlotte, North Carolina
42	June 14	1959	42	Lee Petty (Note: Richard Petty originally took the checkered flag to win his first NASCAR Grand National race. Second place finisher Lee Petty protested the result, asking for a recount of the race's scorecards. NASCAR officials recounted the scorecards and awarded the win to Lee Petty, placing Richard in second.)	1959-20	Lakewood Speedway	Atlanta, Georgia
43	June 18	1959	42	Lee Petty	1959-21	Columbia Speedway	Cayce, South Carolina
44	August 29	1959	42	Lee Petty	1959-35	Columbia Speedway	Cayce, South Carolina
45	September 11	1959	42	Lee Petty	Buddy Shuman 250	Hickory Speedway	Hickory, North Carolina
46	September 20	1959	42	Lee Petty	1959-40	Orange Speedway	Hillsborough, North Carolina
47	October 11	1959	42	Lee Petty	1959-42	Asheville-Weaverville Speedway	Weaverville, North Carolina
48	October 18	1959	42	Lee Petty	Wilkes 160	North Wilkesboro Speedway	North Wilkesboro, North Carolina
49	February 28	1960	43	Richard Petty	1960–06	Southern States Fairgrounds	Charlotte, North Carolina
50	March 27	1960	42	Lee Petty	Gwyn Staley 160	North Wilkesboro Speedway	North Wilkesboro, North Carolina
51	April 10	1960	43	Richard Petty	Virginia 500	Martinsville Speedway	Ridgeway, Virginia
52	April 24	1960	42	Lee Petty	1960-15	Asheville-Weaverville Speedway	Weaverville, North Carolina
53	May 29	1960	42	Lee Petty	1960-18	Orange Speedway	Hillsborough, North Carolina
54	June 5	1960	42	Lee Petty	Richmond 200	Atlantic Rural Fairgrounds	Richmond, Virginia
55	July 10	1960	42	Lee Petty	1960-24	Heidelberg Raceway	Pittsburgh, Pennsylvania
56	September 18	1960	43	Richard Petty	1960–39	Orange Speedway	Hillsborough, North Carolina
57	November 20, 1960	1961	42	Lee Petty	1961-02	Speedway Park	Jacksonville, Florida
58	April 23	1961	43	Richard Petty	Richmond 200	Atlantic Rural Fairgrounds	Richmond, Virginia
59	May 21	1961	43	Richard Petty	World 600 Qualifier #1	Charlotte Motor Speedway	Concord, North Carolina
60	April 15	1962	43	Richard Petty	Gwyn Staley 400	North Wilkesboro Speedway	North Wilkesboro, North Carolina
61	April 22	1962	43	Richard Petty	Virginia 500	Martinsville Speedway	Ridgeway, Virginia
62	July 14	1962	43	Richard Petty	Pickens 200	Greenville-Pickens Speedway	Greenville, South Carolina
63	July 29	1962	42	Jim Paschal	Southeastern 500	Bristol International Speedway	Bristol, Tennessee
64	August 5	1962	42	Jim Paschal	Nashville 500	Nashville Fairgrounds Speedway	Nashville, Tennessee
65	August 8	1962	43	Richard Petty	1962-39	Huntsville Speedway	Huntsville, Alabama
66	August 12	1962	42	Jim Paschal	Western North Carolina 500	Asheville-Weaverville Speedway	Weaverville, North Carolina
67	August 15	1962	42	Richard Petty	1962-41	Starkey Speedway	Roanoke, Virginia
68	August 18	1962	43	Richard Petty	International 200	Bowman Gray Stadium	Winston-Salem, North Carolina
69	August 21	1962	43	Richard Petty	1962-43	Piedmont Interstate Fairgrounds	Spartanburg, South Carolina
70	September 30	1962	43	Richard Petty	Wilkes 320	North Wilkesboro Speedway	North Wilkesboro, North Carolina
71	November 4, 1962	1963	41	Jim Paschal	1963-01	Fairgrounds Raceway	Birmingham, Alabama
72	November 11, 1962	1963	43	Richard Petty	1963-02	Golden Gate Speedway	Tampa, Florida
73	November 22, 1962	1963	41	Jim Paschal	Turkey Day 200	Tar Heel Speedway	Randleman, North Carolina
74	March 2	1963	43	Richard Petty	1963-08	Piedmont Interstate Fairgrounds	Spartanburg, South Carolina
75	March 3	1963	43	Richard Petty	1963-09	Asheville-Weaverville Speedway	Weaverville, North Carolina
76	April 14	1963	43	Richard Petty	South Boston 400	South Boston Speedway	South Boston, Virginia
77	April 15	1963	43	Jim Paschal	1963-18	Bowman Gray Stadium	Winston-Salem, North Carolina
78	April 21	1963	43	Richard Petty	Virginia 500	Martinsville Speedway	Ridgeway, Virginia
79	April 28	1963	43	Richard Petty	Gwyn Staley 400	North Wilkesboro Speedway	North Wilkesboro, North Carolina
80	May 2	1963	41	Richard Petty	Columbia 200	Columbia Speedway	Cayce, South Carolina
81	May 5	1963	43	Jim Paschal	1963-22	Tar Heel Speedway	Randleman, North Carolina
82	May 18	1963	41	Richard Petty	1963-24	Old Dominion Speedway	Manassas, Virginia
83	June 9	1963	41	Richard Petty	1963-27	Fairgrounds Raceway	Birmingham, Alabama
84	July 21	1963	43	Richard Petty	1963-36	Bridgehampton Raceway	Bridgehampton, New York
85	July 30	1963	41	Richard Petty	Pickens 200	Greenville-Pickens Speedway	Greenville, South Carolina
86	August 4	1963	42	Jim Paschal	Nashville 400	Nashville Fairgrounds Speedway	Nashville, Tennessee
87	August 8	1963	43	Richard Petty	Sandlapper 200	Columbia Speedway	Cayce, South Carolina
88	October 5	1963	43	Richard Petty	1963-51	Tar Heel Speedway	Randleman, North Carolina
89	October 20	1963	41	Richard Petty	South Boston 400	South Boston Speedway	South Boston, Virginia
90	December 29, 1963	1964	43	Richard Petty	Sunshine 200	Savannah Speedway	Savannah, Georgia
91	February 23	1964	43	Richard Petty	Daytona 500	Daytona International Speedway	Daytona Beach, Florida
92	May 17	1964	43	Richard Petty	1964-24	South Boston Speedway	South Boston, Virginia
93	May 24	1964	41	Jim Paschal	World 600	Charlotte Motor Speedway	Concord, North Carolina
94	June 11	1964	43	Richard Petty	1964-29	New Concord Speedway	Concord, North Carolina
95	June 14	1964	43	Richard Petty	Music City 200	Nashville Fairgrounds Speedway	Nashville, Tennessee
96	June 26	1964	43	Richard Petty	1964-34	Piedmont Interstate Fairgrounds	Spartanburg, South Carolina
97	August 2	1964	43	Richard Petty	Nashville 400	Nashville Fairgrounds Speedway	Nashville, Tennessee
98	August 16	1964	43	Richard Petty	Mountaineer 500	West Virginia International Speedway	Ona, West Virginia
99	October 25	1964	41	Richard Petty	1964-60	Harris Speedway	Harris, North Carolina
100	July 31	1965	43	Richard Petty	Nashville 400	Nashville Fairgrounds Speedway	Nashville, Tennessee
101	August 8	1965	43	Richard Petty	Western North Carolina 500	Asheville-Weaverville Speedway	Weaverville, North Carolina
102	September 10	1965	43	Richard Petty	Buddy Shuman 250	Hickory Speedway	Hickory, North Carolina
103	September 17	1965	43	Richard Petty	1965-48	Old Dominion Speedway	Manassas, Virginia
104	November 14, 1965	1966	42	Richard Petty	Georgia Cracker 300	Augusta Speedway	Augusta, Georgia
105	February 27	1966	43	Richard Petty	Daytona 500	Daytona International Speedway	Daytona Beach, Florida
106	April 30	1966	43	Richard Petty	Rebel 400	Darlington Raceway	Darlington, South Carolina
107	May 7	1966	43	Richard Petty	Tidewater 250	Langley Field Speedway	Hampton, Virginia
108	May 10	1966	43	Richard Petty	Speedy Morelock 200	Middle Georgia Raceway	Byron, Georgia
109	May 22	1966	42	Marvin Panch	World 600	Charlotte Motor Speedway	Concord, North Carolina
110	June 12	1966	43	Richard Petty	Fireball 300	Asheville-Weaverville Speedway	Weaverville, North Carolina
111	July 30	1966	43	Richard Petty	Nashville 400	Nashville Fairgrounds Speedway	Nashville, Tennessee
112	August 7	1966	43	Richard Petty	Dixie 400	Atlanta International Raceway	Hampton, Georgia
113	November 13, 1966	1967	43	Richard Petty	Augusta 300	Augusta Speedway	Augusta, Georgia
114	March 5	1967	43	Richard Petty	Fireball 300	Asheville-Weaverville Speedway	Weaverville, North Carolina
115	April 6	1967	43	Richard Petty	Columbia 200	Columbia Speedway	Cayce, South Carolina
116	April 9	1967	43	Richard Petty	Hickory 250	Hickory Speedway	Hickory, North Carolina
117	April 23	1967	43	Richard Petty	Virginia 500	Martinsville Speedway	Ridgeway, Virginia
118	April 30	1967	43	Richard Petty	Richmond 250	Virginia State Fairgrounds	Richmond, Virginia
119	May 13	1967	43	Richard Petty	Rebel 400	Darlington Raceway	Darlington, South Carolina
120	May 20	1967	43	Richard Petty	Tidewater 250	Langley Field Speedway	Hampton, Virginia
121	June 6	1967	43	Richard Petty	Macon 300	Middle Georgia Raceway	Byron, Georgia
122	June 8	1967	43	Richard Petty	East Tennessee 200	Smoky Mountain Raceway	Maryville, Tennessee
123	June 18	1967	43	Richard Petty	Carolina 500	North Carolina Motor Speedway	Rockingham, North Carolina
124	June 24	1967	43	Richard Petty	Pickens 200	Greenville-Pickens Speedway	Greenville, South Carolina
125	July 9	1967	43	Richard Petty	Northern 300	Trenton Speedway	Trenton, New Jersey
126	July 13	1967	43	Richard Petty	1967-31	Fonda Speedway	Fonda, New York
127	July 15	1967	43	Richard Petty	Islip 300	Islip Speedway	Islip, New York
128	July 23	1967	43	Richard Petty	Volunteer 500	Bristol International Speedway	Bristol, Tennessee
129	July 29	1967	43	Richard Petty	Nashville 400	Nashville Fairgrounds Speedway	Nashville, Tennessee
130	August 12	1967	43	Richard Petty	Myers Brothers 250	Bowman Gray Stadium	Winston-Salem, North Carolina
131	August 17	1967	43	Richard Petty	Sandlapper 200	Columbia Speedway	Cayce, South Carolina
132	August 25	1967	43	Richard Petty	1967-39	Savannah Speedway	Savannah, Georgia
133	September 4	1967	43	Richard Petty	Southern 500	Darlington Raceway	Darlington, South Carolina
134	September 8	1967	43	Richard Petty	Buddy Shuman 250	Hickory Speedway	Hickory, North Carolina
135	September 10	1967	43	Richard Petty	Capital City 300	Virginia State Fairgrounds	Richmond, Virginia
136	September 15	1967	43	Richard Petty	Maryland 300	Beltsville Speedway	Beltsville, Maryland
137	September 17	1967	43	Richard Petty	Hillsboro 150	Orange Speedway	Hillsborough, North Carolina
138	September 24	1967	43	Richard Petty	Old Dominion 500	Martinsville Speedway	Ridgeway, Virginia
139	October 1	1967	43	Richard Petty	Wilkes 400	North Wilkesboro Speedway	North Wilkesboro, North Carolina
140	November 26, 1967	1968	43	Richard Petty	Alabama 200	Montgomery Speedway	Montgomery, Alabama
141	April 7	1968	43	Richard Petty	Hickory 250	Hickory Speedway	Hickory, North Carolina
142	April 13	1968	43	Richard Petty	Greenville 200	Greenville-Pickens Speedway	Greenville, South Carolina
143	May 31	1968	43	Richard Petty	Asheville 300	New Asheville Speedway	Asheville, North Carolina
144	June 6	1968	43	Richard Petty	East Tennessee 200	Smoky Mountain Raceway	Maryville, Tennessee
145	June 8	1968	43	Richard Petty	1968-22	Fairgrounds Raceway	Birmingham, Alabama
146	June 22	1968	43	Richard Petty	Pickens 200	Greenville-Pickens Speedway	Greenville, South Carolina
147	July 9	1968	43	Richard Petty	Maine 300	Oxford Plains Speedway	Oxford, Maine
148	July 11	1968	43	Richard Petty	Fonda 200	Fonda Speedway	Fonda, New York
149	July 25	1968	43	Richard Petty	Smoky Mountain 200	Smoky Mountain Raceway	Maryville, Tennessee
150	August 23	1968	43	Richard Petty	1968-37	South Boston Speedway	South Boston, Virginia
151	September 8	1968	43	Richard Petty	Capital City 300	Virginia State Fairgrounds	Richmond, Virginia
152	September 15	1968	43	Richard Petty	Hillsboro 150	Orange Speedway	Hillsborough, North Carolina
153	September 22	1968	43	Richard Petty	Old Dominion 500	Martinsville Speedway	Ridgeway, Virginia
154	September 29	1968	43	Richard Petty	Wilkes 400	North Wilkesboro Speedway	North Wilkesboro, North Carolina
155	October 27	1968	43	Richard Petty	American 500	North Carolina Motor Speedway	Rockingham, North Carolina
156	November 17, 1968	1969	43	Richard Petty	Georgia 500	Middle Georgia Raceway	Byron, Georgia
157	February 1	1969	43	Richard Petty	Motor Trend 500	Riverside International Raceway	Riverside, California
158	April 27	1969	43	Richard Petty	Virginia 500	Martinsville Speedway	Ridgeway, Virginia
159	June 19	1969	43	Richard Petty	Kingsport 250	Kingsport Speedway	Kingsport, Tennessee
160	July 6	1969	43	Richard Petty	Mason-Dixon 300	Dover Downs International Speedway	Dover, Delaware
161	July 15	1969	43	Richard Petty	Maryland 300	Beltsville Speedway	Beltsville, Maryland
162	July 26	1969	43	Richard Petty	Nashville 400	Nashville Fairgrounds Speedway	Nashville, Tennessee
163	July 27	1969	43	Richard Petty	Smoky Mountain 200	Smoky Mountain Raceway	Maryville, Tennessee
164	August 22	1969	43	Richard Petty	Myers Brothers 250	Bowman Gray Stadium	Winston-Salem, North Carolina
165	September 28	1969	43	Richard Petty	Old Dominion 500	Martinsville Speedway	Ridgeway, Virginia
166	February 22	1970	40	Pete Hamilton	Daytona 500	Daytona International Speedway	Daytona Beach, Florida
167	March 8	1970	43	Richard Petty	Carolina 500	North Carolina Motor Speedway	Rockingham, North Carolina
168	March 15	1970	43	Richard Petty	Savannah 200	Savannah Speedway	Savannah, Georgia
169	April 12	1970	40	Pete Hamilton	Alabama 500	Alabama International Motor Speedway	Lincoln, Alabama
170	April 18	1970	43	Richard Petty	Gwyn Staley 400	North Wilkesboro Speedway	North Wilkesboro, North Carolina
– (Note: Petty Enterprises leased a dirt track car from owner Don Robertson, and the win is credited to Robertson.)	April 30	1970	43	Richard Petty	Columbia 200	Columbia Speedway	Cayce, South Carolina
171	June 14	1970	43	Richard Petty	Falstaff 400	Riverside International Raceway	Riverside, California
172	June 26	1970	43	Richard Petty	Kingsport 100	Kingsport Speedway	Kingsport, Tennessee
173	July 7	1970	43	Richard Petty	Albany-Saratoga 250	Albany-Saratoga Speedway	Malta, New York
174	July 12	1970	43	Richard Petty	Schaefer 300	Trenton Speedway	Trenton, New Jersey
175	July 24	1970	43	Richard Petty	East Tennessee 200	Smoky Mountain Raceway	Maryville, Tennessee
176	August 2	1970	43	Richard Petty	Dixie 500	Atlanta International Raceway	Hampton, Georgia
177	August 11	1970	43	Richard Petty	West Virginia 300	International Raceway Park	Ona, West Virginia
178	August 23	1970	40	Pete Hamilton	Talladega 500	Alabama International Motor Speedway	Lincoln, Alabama
179	August 28	1970	43	Richard Petty	Myers Brothers 250	Bowman Gray Stadium	Winston-Salem, North Carolina
180	August 29	1970	43	Richard Petty	Halifax County 100	South Boston Speedway	South Boston, Virginia
181	September 13	1970	43	Richard Petty	Capital City 500	Richmond Fairgrounds Raceway	Richmond, Virginia
182	September 20	1970	43	Richard Petty	Mason-Dixon 300	Dover Downs International Speedway	Dover, Delaware
–	September 30	1970	43	Richard Petty	Home State 200 (Note: This was the final NASCAR Cup race held on a dirt track until 2021.)	State Fairgrounds Speedway	Raleigh, North Carolina
183	October 18	1970	43	Richard Petty	Old Dominion 500	Martinsville Speedway	Ridgeway, Virginia
184	November 8	1970	43	Richard Petty	Georgia 500	Middle Georgia Raceway	Byron, Georgia
185	February 14	1971	43	Richard Petty	Daytona 500	Daytona International Speedway	Daytona Beach, Florida
186	March 7	1971	43	Richard Petty	Richmond 500	Richmond Fairgrounds Raceway	Richmond, Virginia
187	March 14	1971	43	Richard Petty	Carolina 500	North Carolina Motor Speedway	Rockingham, North Carolina
188	March 21	1971	43	Richard Petty	Hickory 276	Hickory Speedway	Hickory, North Carolina
189	April 8	1971	43	Richard Petty	Columbia 200	Columbia Speedway	Cayce, South Carolina
190	April 15	1971	43	Richard Petty	Maryville 200	Smoky Mountain Raceway	Maryville, Tennessee
191	April 18	1971	43	Richard Petty	Gwyn Staley 400	North Wilkesboro Speedway	North Wilkesboro, North Carolina
192	April 25	1971	43	Richard Petty	Virginia 500	Martinsville Speedway	Ridgeway, Virginia
193	May 2	1971	11	Buddy Baker	Rebel 400	Darlington Raceway	Darlington, South Carolina
194	May 21	1971	43	Richard Petty	Asheville 300	New Asheville Speedway	Asheville, North Carolina
195	June 26	1971	43	Richard Petty	Pickens 200	Greenville-Pickens Speedway	Greenville, South Carolina
196	July 14	1971	43	Richard Petty	Albany-Saratoga 250	Albany-Saratoga Speedway	Malta, New York
197	July 15	1971	43	Richard Petty	Islip 250	Islip Speedway	Islip, New York
198	July 18	1971	43	Richard Petty	Northern 300	Trenton Speedway	Trenton, New Jersey
199	July 24	1971	43	Richard Petty	Nashville 420	Nashville Fairgrounds Speedway	Nashville, Tennessee
200	August 1	1971	43	Richard Petty	Dixie 500	Atlanta International Raceway	Hampton, Georgia
201	August 8	1971	43	Richard Petty	West Virginia 500	International Raceway Park	Ona, West Virginia
202	August 27	1971	43	Richard Petty	Sandlapper 200	Columbia Speedway	Cayce, South Carolina
203	October 17	1971	43	Richard Petty	Delaware 500	Dover Downs International Speedway	Dover, Delaware
204	October 24	1971	43	Richard Petty	American 500	North Carolina Motor Speedway	Rockingham, North Carolina
205	November 14	1971	43	Richard Petty	Capital City 500	Richmond Fairgrounds Raceway	Richmond, Virginia
206	December 12	1971	43	Richard Petty	Texas 500	Texas World Speedway	College Station, Texas
207	January 23	1972	43	Richard Petty	Winston Western 500	Riverside International Raceway	Riverside, California
208	February 27	1972	43	Richard Petty	Richmond 500	Richmond Fairgrounds Raceway	Richmond, Virginia
209	April 23	1972	43	Richard Petty	Gwyn Staley 400	North Wilkesboro Speedway	North Wilkesboro, North Carolina
210	April 30	1972	43	Richard Petty	Virginia 500	Martinsville Speedway	Ridgeway, Virginia
211	May 28	1972	11	Buddy Baker	World 600	Charlotte Motor Speedway	Concord, North Carolina
212	June 25	1972	43	Richard Petty	Lone Star 500	Texas World Speedway	College Station, Texas
213	September 10	1972	43	Richard Petty	Capital City 500	Richmond Fairgrounds Raceway	Richmond, Virginia
214	September 24	1972	43	Richard Petty	Old Dominion 500	Martinsville Speedway	Ridgeway, Virginia
215	October 1	1972	43	Richard Petty	Wilkes 400	North Wilkesboro Speedway	North Wilkesboro, North Carolina
216	February 18	1973	43	Richard Petty	Daytona 500	Daytona International Speedway	Daytona Beach, Florida
217	February 25	1973	43	Richard Petty	Richmond 500	Richmond Fairgrounds Raceway	Richmond, Virginia
218	April 8	1973	43	Richard Petty	Gwyn Staley 400	North Wilkesboro Speedway	North Wilkesboro, North Carolina
219	June 10	1973	43	Richard Petty	Alamo 500	Texas World Speedway	College Station, Texas
220	September 9	1973	43	Richard Petty	Capital City 500	Richmond Fairgrounds Raceway	Richmond, Virginia
221	September 30	1973	43	Richard Petty	Old Dominion 500	Martinsville Speedway	Ridgeway, Virginia
222	February 17	1974	43	Richard Petty	Daytona 500	Daytona International Speedway	Daytona Beach, Florida
223	March 3	1974	43	Richard Petty	Carolina 500	North Carolina Motor Speedway	Rockingham, North Carolina
224	April 21	1974	43	Richard Petty	Gwyn Staley 400	North Wilkesboro Speedway	North Wilkesboro, North Carolina
225	May 11	1974	43	Richard Petty	Music City USA 420	Nashville Fairgrounds Speedway	Nashville, Tennessee
226	June 16	1974	43	Richard Petty	Motor State 360	Michigan International Speedway	Brooklyn, Michigan
227	July 28	1974	43	Richard Petty	Dixie 500	Atlanta International Raceway	Hampton, Georgia
228	August 4	1974	43	Richard Petty	Purolator 500	Pocono International Raceway	Long Pond, Pennsylvania
229	August 11	1974	43	Richard Petty	Talladega 500	Alabama International Motor Speedway	Lincoln, Alabama
230	September 8	1974	43	Richard Petty	Capital City 500	Richmond Fairgrounds Raceway	Richmond, Virginia
231	September 15	1974	43	Richard Petty	Delaware 500	Dover Downs International Speedway	Dover, Delaware
232	February 23	1975	43	Richard Petty	Richmond 500	Richmond Fairgrounds Raceway	Richmond, Virginia
233	March 16	1975	43	Richard Petty	Southeastern 500	Bristol International Speedway	Bristol, Tennessee
234	March 23	1975	43	Richard Petty	Atlanta 500	Atlanta International Raceway	Hampton, Georgia
235	April 6	1975	43	Richard Petty	Gwyn Staley 400	North Wilkesboro Speedway	North Wilkesboro, North Carolina
236	April 27	1975	43	Richard Petty	Virginia 500	Martinsville Speedway	Ridgeway, Virginia
237	May 25	1975	43	Richard Petty	World 600	Charlotte Motor Speedway	Concord, North Carolina
238	June 8	1975	43	Richard Petty	Tuborg 400	Riverside International Raceway	Riverside, California
239	July 4	1975	43	Richard Petty	Firecracker 400	Daytona International Speedway	Daytona Beach, Florida
240	August 24	1975	43	Richard Petty	Champion Spark Plug 400	Michigan International Speedway	Brooklyn, Michigan
241	September 14	1975	43	Richard Petty	Delaware 500	Dover Downs International Speedway	Dover, Delaware
242	September 21	1975	43	Richard Petty	Wilkes 400	North Wilkesboro Speedway	North Wilkesboro, North Carolina
243	October 5	1975	43	Richard Petty	National 500	Charlotte Motor Speedway	Concord, North Carolina
244	November 2	1975	43	Richard Petty	Volunteer 500	Bristol International Speedway	Bristol, Tennessee
245	February 29	1976	43	Richard Petty	Carolina 500	North Carolina Motor Speedway	Rockingham, North Carolina
246	August 1	1976	43	Richard Petty	Purolator 500	Pocono International Raceway	Long Pond, Pennsylvania
247	October 24	1976	43	Richard Petty	American 500	North Carolina Motor Speedway	Rockingham, North Carolina
248	March 13	1977	43	Richard Petty	Carolina 500	North Carolina Motor Speedway	Rockingham, North Carolina
249	March 20	1977	43	Richard Petty	Atlanta 500	Atlanta International Raceway	Hampton, Georgia
250	May 29	1977	43	Richard Petty	World 600	Charlotte Motor Speedway	Concord, North Carolina
251	June 12	1977	43	Richard Petty	NAPA 400	Riverside International Raceway	Riverside, California
252	July 4	1977	43	Richard Petty	Firecracker 400	Daytona International Speedway	Daytona Beach, Florida
253	February 18	1979	43	Richard Petty	Daytona 500	Daytona International Speedway	Daytona Beach, Florida
254	April 22	1979	43	Richard Petty	Virginia 500	Martinsville Speedway	Ridgeway, Virginia
255	August 19	1979	43	Richard Petty	Champion Spark Plug 400	Michigan International Speedway	Brooklyn, Michigan
256	September 16	1979	43	Richard Petty	CRC Chemicals 500	Dover Downs International Speedway	Dover, Delaware
257	October 21	1979	43	Richard Petty	American 500	North Carolina Motor Speedway	Rockingham, North Carolina
258	April 20	1980	43	Richard Petty	Northwestern Bank 400	North Wilkesboro Speedway	North Wilkesboro, North Carolina
259	May 10	1980	43	Richard Petty	Music City USA 420	Nashville Fairgrounds Speedway	Nashville, Tennessee
260	February 15	1981	43	Richard Petty	Daytona 500	Daytona International Speedway	Daytona Beach, Florida
261	April 5	1981	43	Richard Petty	Northwestern Bank 400	North Wilkesboro Speedway	North Wilkesboro, North Carolina
262	August 16	1981	43	Richard Petty	Champion Spark Plug 400	Michigan International Speedway	Brooklyn, Michigan
263	March 6/13 (Note: The race was stopped just past a quarter distance due to rain and resumed a week later.)	1983	43	Richard Petty	Warner W. Hodgdon Carolina 500	North Carolina Motor Speedway	Rockingham, North Carolina
264	May 1	1983	43	Richard Petty	Winston 500	Alabama International Motor Speedway	Lincoln, Alabama
265	October 9	1983	43	Richard Petty	Miller High Life 500	Charlotte Motor Speedway	Concord, North Carolina
266	October 27	1996	43	Bobby Hamilton	Dura Lube 500	Phoenix International Raceway	Avondale, Arizona
267	October 27	1997	43	Bobby Hamilton	AC Delco 400	North Carolina Motor Speedway	Rockingham, North Carolina
268	April 18	1999	43	John Andretti	Goody's Body Pain 500	Martinsville Speedway	Ridgeway, Virginia

=== Exhibition Races ===
NASCAR Exhibition victories
No.	Date	Season	Car #	Driver	Race	Track	Location
1	February 8	1964	43	Richard Petty	Daytona 500 Pole Position Race #2	Daytona International Speedway	Daytona Beach, Florida
2	July 29	1973	43	Richard Petty	ACME Super Saver 500 (Note: Race was run under USAC Stock Car Series sanctioning.)	Pocono International Raceway	Long Pond, Pennsylvania
3	February 17	1977	43	Richard Petty	Qualifying Race #1	Daytona International Speedway	Daytona Beach, Florida

=== Wins by driver ===
Eight drivers won at least one points race for Petty Enterprises in the Cup Series; Lee and Richard Petty combined to win 250 of the 268 races.

NASCAR Cup Series victories by driver
Driver	Wins (Points)	Wins (Exhibition)	First Win (Points)	Last Win (Points)
Richard Petty	196	3	1960	1983
Lee Petty	54	0	1949	1961
Jim Paschal	9	0	1962	1964
Pete Hamilton	3	0	1970	1970
Buddy Baker	2	0	1971	1972
Bobby Hamilton	2	0	1996	1997
Marvin Panch	1	0	1966	1966
John Andretti	1	0	1999	1999

== Convertible Division ==
The Petty's ran part-time in the NASCAR Convertible Division from 1957 to 1959, winning three races.

NASCAR Convertible Division victories
No.	Date	Season	Car #	Driver	Race	Track	Location
1	May 16	1958	42	Lee Petty	1958-10	Southern States Fairgrounds	Charlotte, North Carolina
2	July 18	1959	43	Richard Petty	1959-13	Columbia Speedway	Cayce, South Carolina
3	July 31	1959	42	Lee Petty	1959-14	Greenville-Pickens Speedway	Greenville, South Carolina

== Truck Series ==
Petty Enterprises fielded an entry in the NASCAR Truck Series from the inaugural season in 1995 to the 2002 season, winning two races with Jimmy Hensley.

NASCAR Truck Series victories
No.	Date	Season	Car #	Driver	Race	Track	Location
1	August 15	1998	43	Jimmy Hensley	Federated Auto Parts 250	Nashville Fairgrounds Speedway	Nashville, Tennessee
2	April 17	1999	43	Jimmy Hensley	NAPA 250	Martinsville Speedway	Ridgeway, Virginia

== ARCA Series ==
In 1979, Petty fielded Kyle Petty in the ARCA series for a race at Daytona, which he won. In 1998, Adam Petty made two starts for the team, winning once, and in 2007 Chad McCumbee ran at Pocono, winning the race.

ARCA Series victories
No.	Date	Season	Car #	Driver	Race	Track	Location
1	February 11	1979	44	Kyle Petty	Daytona ARCA 200	Daytona International Speedway	Daytona Beach, Florida
2	September 30	1998	45	Adam Petty	EasyCare Certified 100	Charlotte Motor Speedway	Concord, North Carolina
3	June 9	2007	62	Chad McCumbee	Pocono 200	Pocono Raceway	Long Pond, Pennsylvania

== Winston West Series ==
Richard Petty competed in eight Winston West Series races from 1964 to 1984, winning three times at Phoenix International Raceway.

NASCAR Winston West victories
No.	Date	Season	Car #	Driver	Race	Track	Location
1	November 26	1978	43	Richard Petty	Arizona NAPA 250	Phoenix International Raceway	Avondale, Arizona
2	November 23	1980	43	Richard Petty	Arizona Winston 250	Phoenix International Raceway	Avondale, Arizona
3	November 29	1981	43	Richard Petty	Warner W. Hodgdon 250	Phoenix International Raceway	Avondale, Arizona

== See also ==
- List of NASCAR race wins by Richard Petty
- List of NASCAR race wins by Hendrick Motorsports
- List of NASCAR race wins by Joe Gibbs Racing
