= List of NASCAR race wins by Richard Petty =

Richard Petty is an American racing driver who competed in the NASCAR Cup Series championship from 1958 to 1992. Over the course of his racing career, Petty amassed 200 victories in the top series of NASCAR, becoming the most prolific winner in series history.

== NASCAR ==
=== Grand National/Winston Cup Series ===
Petty won 200 races from 1960 to 1984. Of those, 196 wins came with Petty Enterprises, mainly in the No. 43 but also in No. 41 and 42 from 1962 to 1966. Petty ran two dirt races for owner Don Robertson in 1970 at Columbia Speedway and North Carolina State Fairgrounds as part of a deal with Petty Enterprises, winning both starts. He moved to newly-formed Curb Racing for 1984 and 1985, winning his last two career races during the 1984 season.

NASCAR Cup Series victories
No.	Date	Season	Race	Track	Location
1	February 28	1960	1960–06	Southern States Fairgrounds	Charlotte, North Carolina
2	April 10	1960	Virginia 500	Martinsville Speedway	Ridgeway, Virginia
3	September 18	1960	1960–39	Orange Speedway	Hillsborough, North Carolina
4	April 23	1961	Richmond 200	Atlantic Rural Fairgrounds	Richmond, Virginia
5	May 21	1961	World 600 Qualifier #1	Charlotte Motor Speedway	Concord, North Carolina
6	April 15	1962	Gwyn Staley 400	North Wilkesboro Speedway	North Wilkesboro, North Carolina
7	April 22	1962	Virginia 500	Martinsville Speedway	Ridgeway, Virginia
8	July 14	1962	Pickens 200	Greenville-Pickens Speedway	Greenville, South Carolina
9	August 8	1962	1962-39	Huntsville Speedway	Huntsville, Alabama
10	August 15	1962	1962-41	Starkey Speedway	Roanoke, Virginia
11	August 18	1962	International 200	Bowman Gray Stadium	Winston-Salem, North Carolina
12	August 21	1962	1962-43	Piedmont Interstate Fairgrounds	Spartanburg, South Carolina
13	September 30	1962	Wilkes 320	North Wilkesboro Speedway	North Wilkesboro, North Carolina
14	November 11, 1962	1963	1963-02	Golden Gate Speedway	Tampa, Florida
15	March 2	1963	1963-08	Piedmont Interstate Fairgrounds	Spartanburg, South Carolina
16	March 3	1963	1963-09	Asheville-Weaverville Speedway	Weaverville, North Carolina
17	April 14	1963	South Boston 400	South Boston Speedway	South Boston, Virginia
18	April 21	1963	Virginia 500	Martinsville Speedway	Ridgeway, Virginia
19	April 28	1963	Gwyn Staley 400	North Wilkesboro Speedway	North Wilkesboro, North Carolina
20	May 2	1963	Columbia 200	Columbia Speedway	Cayce, South Carolina
21	May 18	1963	1963-24	Old Dominion Speedway	Manassas, Virginia
22	June 9	1963	1963-27	Fairgrounds Raceway	Birmingham, Alabama
23	July 21	1963	1963-36	Bridgehampton Raceway	Bridgehampton, New York
24	July 30	1963	Pickens 200	Greenville-Pickens Speedway	Greenville, South Carolina
25	August 8	1963	Sandlapper 200	Columbia Speedway	Cayce, South Carolina
26	October 5	1963	1963-51	Tar Heel Speedway	Randleman, North Carolina
27	October 20	1963	South Boston 400	South Boston Speedway	South Boston, Virginia
28	December 29, 1963	1964	Sunshine 200	Savannah Speedway	Savannah, Georgia
29	February 23	1964	Daytona 500	Daytona International Speedway	Daytona Beach, Florida
30	May 17	1964	1964-24	South Boston Speedway	South Boston, Virginia
31	June 11	1964	1964-29	New Concord Speedway	Concord, North Carolina
32	June 14	1964	Music City 200	Nashville Fairgrounds Speedway	Nashville, Tennessee
33	June 26	1964	1964-34	Piedmont Interstate Fairgrounds	Spartanburg, South Carolina
34	August 2	1964	Nashville 400	Nashville Fairgrounds Speedway	Nashville, Tennessee
35	August 16	1964	Mountaineer 500	West Virginia International Speedway	Ona, West Virginia
36	October 25	1964	1964-60	Harris Speedway	Harris, North Carolina
37	July 31	1965	Nashville 400	Nashville Fairgrounds Speedway	Nashville, Tennessee
38	August 8	1965	Western North Carolina 500	Asheville-Weaverville Speedway	Weaverville, North Carolina
39	September 10	1965	Buddy Shuman 250	Hickory Speedway	Hickory, North Carolina
40	September 17	1965	1965-48	Old Dominion Speedway	Manassas, Virginia
41	November 14, 1965	1966	Georgia Cracker 300	Augusta Speedway	Augusta, Georgia
42	February 27	1966	Daytona 500	Daytona International Speedway	Daytona Beach, Florida
43	April 30	1966	Rebel 400	Darlington Raceway	Darlington, South Carolina
44	May 7	1966	Tidewater 250	Langley Field Speedway	Hampton, Virginia
45	May 10	1966	Speedy Morelock 200	Middle Georgia Raceway	Byron, Georgia
46	June 12	1966	Fireball 300	Asheville-Weaverville Speedway	Weaverville, North Carolina
47	July 30	1966	Nashville 400	Nashville Fairgrounds Speedway	Nashville, Tennessee
48	August 7	1966	Dixie 400	Atlanta International Raceway	Hampton, Georgia
49	November 13, 1966	1967	Augusta 300	Augusta Speedway	Augusta, Georgia
50	March 5	1967	Fireball 300	Asheville-Weaverville Speedway	Weaverville, North Carolina
51	April 6	1967	Columbia 200	Columbia Speedway	Cayce, South Carolina
52	April 9	1967	Hickory 250	Hickory Speedway	Hickory, North Carolina
53	April 23	1967	Virginia 500	Martinsville Speedway	Ridgeway, Virginia
54	April 30	1967	Richmond 250	Virginia State Fairgrounds	Richmond, Virginia
55	May 13	1967	Rebel 400	Darlington Raceway	Darlington, South Carolina
56	May 20	1967	Tidewater 250	Langley Field Speedway	Hampton, Virginia
57	June 6	1967	Macon 300	Middle Georgia Raceway	Byron, Georgia
58	June 8	1967	East Tennessee 200	Smoky Mountain Raceway	Maryville, Tennessee
59	June 18	1967	Carolina 500	North Carolina Motor Speedway	Rockingham, North Carolina
60	June 24	1967	Pickens 200	Greenville-Pickens Speedway	Greenville, South Carolina
61	July 9	1967	Northern 300	Trenton Speedway	Trenton, New Jersey
62	July 13	1967	1967-31	Fonda Speedway	Fonda, New York
63	July 15	1967	Islip 300	Islip Speedway	Islip, New York
64	July 23	1967	Volunteer 500	Bristol International Speedway	Bristol, Tennessee
65	July 29	1967	Nashville 400	Nashville Fairgrounds Speedway	Nashville, Tennessee
66	August 12	1967	Myers Brothers 250	Bowman Gray Stadium	Winston-Salem, North Carolina
67	August 17	1967	Sandlapper 200	Columbia Speedway	Cayce, South Carolina
68	August 25	1967	1967-39	Savannah Speedway	Savannah, Georgia
69	September 4	1967	Southern 500	Darlington Raceway	Darlington, South Carolina
70	September 8	1967	Buddy Shuman 250	Hickory Speedway	Hickory, North Carolina
71	September 10	1967	Capital City 300	Virginia State Fairgrounds	Richmond, Virginia
72	September 15	1967	Maryland 300	Beltsville Speedway	Beltsville, Maryland
73	September 17	1967	Hillsboro 150	Orange Speedway	Hillsborough, North Carolina
74	September 24	1967	Old Dominion 500	Martinsville Speedway	Ridgeway, Virginia
75	October 1	1967	Wilkes 400	North Wilkesboro Speedway	North Wilkesboro, North Carolina
76	November 26, 1967	1968	Alabama 200	Montgomery Speedway	Montgomery, Alabama
77	April 7	1968	Hickory 250	Hickory Speedway	Hickory, North Carolina
78	April 13	1968	Greenville 200	Greenville-Pickens Speedway	Greenville, South Carolina
79	May 31	1968	Asheville 300	New Asheville Speedway	Asheville, North Carolina
80	June 6	1968	East Tennessee 200	Smoky Mountain Raceway	Maryville, Tennessee
81	June 8	1968	1968-22	Fairgrounds Raceway	Birmingham, Alabama
82	June 22	1968	Pickens 200	Greenville-Pickens Speedway	Greenville, South Carolina
83	July 9	1968	Maine 300	Oxford Plains Speedway	Oxford, Maine
84	July 11	1968	Fonda 200	Fonda Speedway	Fonda, New York
85	July 25	1968	Smoky Mountain 200	Smoky Mountain Raceway	Maryville, Tennessee
86	August 23	1968	1968-37	South Boston Speedway	South Boston, Virginia
87	September 8	1968	Capital City 300	Virginia State Fairgrounds	Richmond, Virginia
88	September 15	1968	Hillsboro 150	Orange Speedway	Hillsborough, North Carolina
89	September 22	1968	Old Dominion 500	Martinsville Speedway	Ridgeway, Virginia
90	September 29	1968	Wilkes 400	North Wilkesboro Speedway	North Wilkesboro, North Carolina
91	October 27	1968	American 500	North Carolina Motor Speedway	Rockingham, North Carolina
92	November 17, 1968	1969	Georgia 500	Middle Georgia Raceway	Byron, Georgia
93	February 1	1969	Motor Trend 500	Riverside International Raceway	Riverside, California
94	April 27	1969	Virginia 500	Martinsville Speedway	Ridgeway, Virginia
95	June 19	1969	Kingsport 250	Kingsport Speedway	Kingsport, Tennessee
96	July 6	1969	Mason-Dixon 300	Dover Downs International Speedway	Dover, Delaware
97	July 15	1969	Maryland 300	Beltsville Speedway	Beltsville, Maryland
98	July 26	1969	Nashville 400	Nashville Fairgrounds Speedway	Nashville, Tennessee
99	July 27	1969	Smoky Mountain 200	Smoky Mountain Raceway	Maryville, Tennessee
100	August 22	1969	Myers Brothers 250	Bowman Gray Stadium	Winston-Salem, North Carolina
101	September 28	1969	Old Dominion 500	Martinsville Speedway	Ridgeway, Virginia
102	March 8	1970	Carolina 500	North Carolina Motor Speedway	Rockingham, North Carolina
103	March 15	1970	Savannah 200	Savannah Speedway	Savannah, Georgia
104	April 18	1970	Gwyn Staley 400	North Wilkesboro Speedway	North Wilkesboro, North Carolina
105	April 30	1970	Columbia 200	Columbia Speedway	Cayce, South Carolina
106	June 14	1970	Falstaff 400	Riverside International Raceway	Riverside, California
107	June 26	1970	Kingsport 100	Kingsport Speedway	Kingsport, Tennessee
108	July 7	1970	Albany-Saratoga 250	Albany-Saratoga Speedway	Malta, New York
109	July 12	1970	Schaefer 300	Trenton Speedway	Trenton, New Jersey
110	July 24	1970	East Tennessee 200	Smoky Mountain Raceway	Maryville, Tennessee
111	August 2	1970	Dixie 500	Atlanta International Raceway	Hampton, Georgia
112	August 11	1970	West Virginia 300	International Raceway Park	Ona, West Virginia
113	August 28	1970	Myers Brothers 250	Bowman Gray Stadium	Winston-Salem, North Carolina
114	August 29	1970	Halifax County 100	South Boston Speedway	South Boston, Virginia
115	September 13	1970	Capital City 500	Richmond Fairgrounds Raceway	Richmond, Virginia
116	September 20	1970	Mason-Dixon 300	Dover Downs International Speedway	Dover, Delaware
117	September 30	1970	Home State 200 (Note: This was the final NASCAR Cup race held on a dirt track until 2021.)	State Fairgrounds Speedway	Raleigh, North Carolina
118	October 18	1970	Old Dominion 500	Martinsville Speedway	Ridgeway, Virginia
119	November 8	1970	Georgia 500	Middle Georgia Raceway	Byron, Georgia
120	February 14	1971	Daytona 500	Daytona International Speedway	Daytona Beach, Florida
121	March 7	1971	Richmond 500	Richmond Fairgrounds Raceway	Richmond, Virginia
122	March 14	1971	Carolina 500	North Carolina Motor Speedway	Rockingham, North Carolina
123	March 21	1971	Hickory 276	Hickory Speedway	Hickory, North Carolina
124	April 8	1971	Columbia 200	Columbia Speedway	Cayce, South Carolina
125	April 15	1971	Maryville 200	Smoky Mountain Raceway	Maryville, Tennessee
126	April 18	1971	Gwyn Staley 400	North Wilkesboro Speedway	North Wilkesboro, North Carolina
127	April 25	1971	Virginia 500	Martinsville Speedway	Ridgeway, Virginia
128	May 21	1971	Asheville 300	New Asheville Speedway	Asheville, North Carolina
129	June 26	1971	Pickens 200	Greenville-Pickens Speedway	Greenville, South Carolina
130	July 14	1971	Albany-Saratoga 250	Albany-Saratoga Speedway	Malta, New York
131	July 15	1971	Islip 250	Islip Speedway	Islip, New York
132	July 18	1971	Northern 300	Trenton Speedway	Trenton, New Jersey
133	July 24	1971	Nashville 420	Nashville Fairgrounds Speedway	Nashville, Tennessee
134	August 1	1971	Dixie 500	Atlanta International Raceway	Hampton, Georgia
135	August 8	1971	West Virginia 500	International Raceway Park	Ona, West Virginia
136	August 27	1971	Sandlapper 200	Columbia Speedway	Cayce, South Carolina
137	October 17	1971	Delaware 500	Dover Downs International Speedway	Dover, Delaware
138	October 24	1971	American 500	North Carolina Motor Speedway	Rockingham, North Carolina
139	November 14	1971	Capital City 500	Richmond Fairgrounds Raceway	Richmond, Virginia
140	December 12	1971	Texas 500	Texas World Speedway	College Station, Texas
141	January 23	1972	Winston Western 500	Riverside International Raceway	Riverside, California
142	February 27	1972	Richmond 500	Richmond Fairgrounds Raceway	Richmond, Virginia
143	April 23	1972	Gwyn Staley 400	North Wilkesboro Speedway	North Wilkesboro, North Carolina
144	April 30	1972	Virginia 500	Martinsville Speedway	Ridgeway, Virginia
145	June 25	1972	Lone Star 500	Texas World Speedway	College Station, Texas
146	September 10	1972	Capital City 500	Richmond Fairgrounds Raceway	Richmond, Virginia
147	September 24	1972	Old Dominion 500	Martinsville Speedway	Ridgeway, Virginia
148	October 1	1972	Wilkes 400	North Wilkesboro Speedway	North Wilkesboro, North Carolina
149	February 18	1973	Daytona 500	Daytona International Speedway	Daytona Beach, Florida
150	February 25	1973	Richmond 500	Richmond Fairgrounds Raceway	Richmond, Virginia
151	April 8	1973	Gwyn Staley 400	North Wilkesboro Speedway	North Wilkesboro, North Carolina
152	June 10	1973	Alamo 500	Texas World Speedway	College Station, Texas
153	September 9	1973	Capital City 500	Richmond Fairgrounds Raceway	Richmond, Virginia
154	September 30	1973	Old Dominion 500	Martinsville Speedway	Ridgeway, Virginia
155	February 17	1974	Daytona 500	Daytona International Speedway	Daytona Beach, Florida
156	March 3	1974	Carolina 500	North Carolina Motor Speedway	Rockingham, North Carolina
157	April 21	1974	Gwyn Staley 400	North Wilkesboro Speedway	North Wilkesboro, North Carolina
158	May 11	1974	Music City USA 420	Nashville Fairgrounds Speedway	Nashville, Tennessee
159	June 16	1974	Motor State 360	Michigan International Speedway	Brooklyn, Michigan
160	July 28	1974	Dixie 500	Atlanta International Raceway	Hampton, Georgia
161	August 4	1974	Purolator 500	Pocono International Raceway	Long Pond, Pennsylvania
162	August 11	1974	Talladega 500	Alabama International Motor Speedway	Lincoln, Alabama
163	September 8	1974	Capital City 500	Richmond Fairgrounds Raceway	Richmond, Virginia
164	September 15	1974	Delaware 500	Dover Downs International Speedway	Dover, Delaware
165	February 23	1975	Richmond 500	Richmond Fairgrounds Raceway	Richmond, Virginia
166	March 16	1975	Southeastern 500	Bristol International Speedway	Bristol, Tennessee
167	March 23	1975	Atlanta 500	Atlanta International Raceway	Hampton, Georgia
168	April 6	1975	Gwyn Staley 400	North Wilkesboro Speedway	North Wilkesboro, North Carolina
169	April 27	1975	Virginia 500	Martinsville Speedway	Ridgeway, Virginia
170	May 25	1975	World 600	Charlotte Motor Speedway	Concord, North Carolina
171	June 8	1975	Tuborg 400	Riverside International Raceway	Riverside, California
172	July 4	1975	Firecracker 400	Daytona International Speedway	Daytona Beach, Florida
173	August 24	1975	Champion Spark Plug 400	Michigan International Speedway	Brooklyn, Michigan
174	September 14	1975	Delaware 500	Dover Downs International Speedway	Dover, Delaware
175	September 21	1975	Wilkes 400	North Wilkesboro Speedway	North Wilkesboro, North Carolina
176	October 5	1975	National 500	Charlotte Motor Speedway	Concord, North Carolina
177	November 2	1975	Volunteer 500	Bristol International Speedway	Bristol, Tennessee
178	February 29	1976	Carolina 500	North Carolina Motor Speedway	Rockingham, North Carolina
179	August 1	1976	Purolator 500	Pocono International Raceway	Long Pond, Pennsylvania
180	October 24	1976	American 500	North Carolina Motor Speedway	Rockingham, North Carolina
181	March 13	1977	Carolina 500	North Carolina Motor Speedway	Rockingham, North Carolina
182	March 20	1977	Atlanta 500	Atlanta International Raceway	Hampton, Georgia
183	May 29	1977	World 600	Charlotte Motor Speedway	Concord, North Carolina
184	June 12	1977	NAPA 400	Riverside International Raceway	Riverside, California
185	July 4	1977	Firecracker 400	Daytona International Speedway	Daytona Beach, Florida
186	February 18	1979	Daytona 500	Daytona International Speedway	Daytona Beach, Florida
187	April 22	1979	Virginia 500	Martinsville Speedway	Ridgeway, Virginia
188	August 19	1979	Champion Spark Plug 400	Michigan International Speedway	Brooklyn, Michigan
189	September 16	1979	CRC Chemicals 500	Dover Downs International Speedway	Dover, Delaware
190	October 21	1979	American 500	North Carolina Motor Speedway	Rockingham, North Carolina
191	April 20	1980	Northwestern Bank 400	North Wilkesboro Speedway	North Wilkesboro, North Carolina
192	May 10	1980	Music City USA 420	Nashville Fairgrounds Speedway	Nashville, Tennessee
193	February 15	1981	Daytona 500	Daytona International Speedway	Daytona Beach, Florida
194	April 5	1981	Northwestern Bank 400	North Wilkesboro Speedway	North Wilkesboro, North Carolina
195	August 16	1981	Champion Spark Plug 400	Michigan International Speedway	Brooklyn, Michigan
196	March 6/13 (Note: The race was stopped just past a quarter distance due to rain and resumed a week later.)	1983	Warner W. Hodgdon Carolina 500	North Carolina Motor Speedway	Rockingham, North Carolina
197	May 1	1983	Winston 500	Alabama International Motor Speedway	Lincoln, Alabama
198	October 9	1983	Miller High Life 500	Charlotte Motor Speedway	Concord, North Carolina
199	May 20	1984	Budweiser 500	Dover Downs International Speedway	Dover, Delaware
200	July 4	1984	Firecracker 400	Daytona International Speedway	Daytona Beach, Florida

=== Convertible Division ===
Petty ran fifteen races in the NASCAR Convertible Division in 1958 and 1959, winning one race at Columbia Speedway.

NASCAR Convertible Division victories
No.	Date	Season	Race	Track	Location
1	July 18	1959	1959-13	Columbia Speedway	Cayce, South Carolina

=== Winston West Series ===
Petty competed in eight Winston West Series races from 1964 to 1984, winning three times at Phoenix International Raceway.

NASCAR Winston West victories
No.	Date	Season	Race	Track	Location
1	November 26	1978	Arizona NAPA 250	Phoenix International Raceway	Avondale, Arizona
2	November 23	1980	Arizona Winston 250	Phoenix International Raceway	Avondale, Arizona
3	November 29	1981	Warner W. Hodgdon 250	Phoenix International Raceway	Avondale, Arizona

=== Exhibition races ===
NASCAR exhibition victories
No.	Date	Season	Race	Track	Location
1	February 8	1964	Daytona 500 Pole Position Race #2	Daytona International Speedway	Daytona Beach, Florida
2	July 29	1973	ACME Super Saver 500 (Note: Race was run under USAC Stock Car Series sanctioning.)	Pocono International Raceway	Long Pond, Pennsylvania
3	February 17	1977	Qualifying Race #1	Daytona International Speedway	Daytona Beach, Florida

== See also ==
- List of all-time NASCAR Cup Series winners
