= State Fairgrounds Speedway (disambiguation) =

There are several speedways/raceways/race tracks at state fairgrounds in the United States:

- Arizona State Fairgrounds Speedway; Phoenix, Arizona
- California State Fairgrounds Speedway; Sacramento, California
- DuQuoin State Fairgrounds Racetrack; DuQuoin, Illinois
- Indiana State Fairgrounds Speedway; Indianapolis, Indiana
- Illinois State Fairgrounds Racetrack; Springfield, Illinois
- Louisiana State Fair Speedway; Shreveport, Louisiana active from at least the 1920s until the 1970s
- Michigan State Fairgrounds Speedway; Detroit, Michigan
- Milwaukee Mile; West Allis, Wisconsin
- Missouri State Fair Speedway; Sedalia, Missouri
- Music City Motorplex; Nashville, Tennessee
- Richmond International Raceway; Richmond, Virginia
- State Fairgrounds Speedway, Raleigh, North Carolina
- Syracuse Mile at New York State Fairgrounds, Syracuse, New York
