= Charlie Glotzbach =

American racing driver (1938–2021)

- Born: Charles Lee Glotzbach; June 19, 1938; Edwardsville, Indiana, U.S.
- Died: April 23, 2021 (aged 82); Jeffersonville, Indiana, U.S.
- Awards: 1964 ARCA Rookie of the Year

NASCAR Cup Series career
- 124 races run over 15 years
- Best finish: 19th (1968)
- First race: 1960 National 400 (Charlotte)
- Last race: 1992 DieHard 500 (Talladega)
- First win: 1968 National 500 (Charlotte)
- Last win: 1971 Volunteer 500 (Bristol)
Wins	Top tens	Poles
4	50	12

Charles Lee Glotzbach (June 19, 1938 – April 23, 2021) was an American ARCA and NASCAR Winston Cup Series driver. He held one of the oldest race records in NASCAR. He held the record for fastest pace at Bristol Motor Speedway for a NASCAR race until 2024. He was also known as the "Chargin' Comet" and "Chargin' Charlie".

== Volunteer 500 win ==
In 1971, Glotzbach won the caution-free Volunteer 500 at Bristol Motor Speedway in a record pace that still stood for 53 years. The race was completed with an average speed of 101.074 mph (two hours, 38 minutes) at the .533-mile track in a race that did not feature a single safety car period in the July heat. Glotzbach required relief during the middle of the race from Friday Hassler.

The record was broken at the 2024 running of the race, which Kyle Larson won despite five safety car periods, with a time of 2:37:53 at 101.277 mph.

== NASCAR history ==
Glotzbach's first NASCAR Winston Cup race was in 1960. While never running a full Winston Cup schedule, he ran a partial schedule every year from 1967 to 1975. The most he ran in a single year was in 1968, when he raced in 22 of 48 events. In 1969, he finished second in the Daytona 500 after being passed on the last lap by LeeRoy Yarbrough.

In late 1969, Glotzbach received broken ribs and was shot twice after firing an employee of his trucking company. He returned the next season and continued to run competitively with one of the bullets still in his upper arm. (ABC Wide World of Sports Broadcast, 1970 Daytona 500.)

Glotzbach set a world record of 199.466 mph in September 1969 at Talladega, driving the Chrysler Engineering No. 88 Dodge Charger Daytona. The car was the pole winner, but Glotzbach, along with most other drivers, sat out the race due to a tire boycott.

Glotzbach's last NASCAR Winston Cup race was in 1992, a season when he competed in seven events. He has four wins and twelve poles in NASCAR and his last attempt was in 1994 for the inaugural Brickyard 400 when he did not qualify.

== Other racing ==
Glotzbach was named the 1964 ARCA series Rookie of the Year. He also attempted to qualify for the 1969 and 1970 Indianapolis 500 races, but failed to qualify for both.

In later life, Glotzbach ran a truck sales business named "Charlie's Truck Sales" in Sellersburg, Indiana.

In a charity legends race on March 20, 2010, Glotzbach was involved in a serious crash at Bristol Motor Speedway. He T-boned the driver's side of Larry Pearson at near full speed after Pearson spun. Both drivers suffered injuries, but none were life-threatening.

== Personal life ==
Glotzbach was born in Edwardsville, Indiana.

Glotzbach was found dead in his home in Jeffersonville, Indiana, on April 23, 2021. He was 82 years old.

== Motorsports career results ==
=== NASCAR ===
(key) (Bold – Pole position awarded by qualifying time Italics – Pole position earned by points standings or practice time * – Most laps led)

==== Grand National Series ====
NASCAR Grand National Series results
Year	Team	No.	Make	1	2	3	4	5	6	7	8	9	10	11	12	13	14	15	16	17	18	19	20	21	22	23	24	25	26	27	28	29	30	31	32	33	34	35	36	37	38	39	40	41	42	43	44	45	46	47	48	49	50	51	52	53	54	NGNC	Pts	Ref
1960	Red Hollingsworth	34	Chevy	CLT	CLB	DAY	DAY	DAY	CLT	NWS	PHO	CLB	MAR	HCY	WIL	BGS	GPS	AWS	DAR	PIF	HBO	RCH	HMS	CLT	BGS	DAY	HEI	MAB	MBS	ATL	BIR	NSV	AWS	PIF	CLB	SBO	BGS	DAR	HCY	CSF	GSP	HBO	MAR	NWS	CLT; 28	RCH	ATL; 31											136th	84	
1961	Melvin Black	65	Pontiac	CLT	JSP	DAY	DAY; 11	DAY; 15				ATL; 43	GPS	HBO	BGS	MAR	NWS	CLB	HCY	RCH	MAR	DAR	CLT	CLT	RSD	ASP	CLT	PIF	BIR	GPS	BGS	NOR	HAS	STR	DAY	ATL	CLB	MBS	BRI	NSV	BGS	AWS	RCH	SBO	DAR	HCY	RCH	CSF	ATL	MAR	NWS	CLT	BRI	GPS	HBO			56th	-	
1961	Melvin Black	65	Chevy						PIF; 15	AWS	HMS																																															56th	-	
1967	K&K Insurance Racing	37	Dodge	AUG	RSD	DAY; 8	DAY	DAY; 33	AWS	BRI	GPS	BGS	ATL; 4	CLB	HCY	NWS	MAR	SVH	RCH	DAR	BLV	LGY	CLT; 42	ASH	MGR	SMR	BIR	CAR; 7	GPS	MGY	DAY	TRN	OXF	FDA	ISP	BRI	SMR	NSV																				23rd	11444	
1967	K&K Insurance Racing	72	Dodge																																				ATL; 37	BGS	CLB	SVH	DAR; 4	HCY	RCH	BLV	HBO	MAR	NWS	CLT; 4	CAR; 32	AWS						23rd	11444	
1968	Friedkin Enterprises	40	Plymouth	MGR; 23	MGY	RSD																																																				19th	1693	
1968	Friedkin Enterprises	15	Plymouth				DAY; 32	BRI																																																		19th	1693	
1968	Owens Racing	6	Dodge						RCH; 2	ATL; 4	HCY	GPS; 3	CLB; 2	NWS	MAR	AUG	AWS	DAR; 28	BLV	LGY	CLT; 6	ASH	MGR	SMR	BIR	CAR; 20	GPS	**DAY**; 9	ISP	OXF	FDA	TRN; 4	BRI; 18	SMR		ATL; 25	CLB; 2	BGS	AWS	SBO; 4	LGY; 18	**DAR**; 4	HCY	RCH	BLV	HBO	MAR; 39	NWS; 24	AUG	**CLT**; 1	CAR; 41	JFC						19th	1693	
1968	Ervin Pruitt	57	Dodge																																NSV; 5																							19th	1693	
1969	Owens Racing	6	Dodge	MGR	MGY	RSD	DAY	DAY; 2	DAY; 2	CAR; 26	AUG	BRI; 19	**ATL**; 33	CLB	HCY	GPS	RCH	NWS	MAR	AWS	DAR	BLV	LGY	CLT	MGR	SMR	MCH; 5	KPT	GPS	NCF																												37th	944	
1969	Fox Racing	3	Dodge																												DAY; 32	DOV	TPN	TRN	BLV	BRI	NSV	SMR																				37th	944	
1969	Smokey Yunick Racing	13	Ford																																				ATL; 4																			37th	944	
1969	Nichels Engineering	88	Dodge																																					MCH; 14	SBO	BGS	AWS	DAR; 6	HCY	RCH	TAL; Wth	CLB	MAR	NWS								37th	944	
1969	Nichels Engineering	99	Dodge																																																CLT; 4	SVH	AUG	**CAR**; 23	JFC	MGR	TWS	37th	944	
1970	Nichels Engineering	99	Dodge	RSD	DAY	DAY; 1*	DAY; 4	RCH	CAR; 17	SVH	ATL; 38	BRI	TAL; 31	NWS	CLB	**DAR**; 22	BLV	LGY	CLT; 25			MCH; 24	RSD	HCY			DAY; 4	AST	TPN	TRN; 3	BRI	SMR	NSV	ATL; 33	CLB	ONA	**MCH**; 1*	TAL; 3	BGS	SBO	DAR; 6	HCY	RCH	DOV; 3	NCF	NWS	**CLT**; 37	MAR	MGR	**CAR**; 31	LGY							28th	1358	
1970	Robertson Racing	23	Plymouth																	SMR; 14	MAR																																					28th	1358	
1970	Robertson Racing	2	Plymouth																						KPT; 15	GPS																																28th	1358	
1971	John McCarthy	38	Dodge	RSD	DAY	DAY	DAY	ONT	RCH	CAR	HCY	BRI	ATL; 7	CLB; 6	GPS; 18	SMR; 7																																										42nd	699	
1971	Junior Fields	91	Chevy														NWS; 26	MAR	DAR; 34	SBO	TAL	ASH	KPT																																			42nd	699	
1971	Howard & Egerton Racing	3	Chevy																					**CLT**; 28	DOV	MCH	RSD	HOU	GPS	DAY; 37	BRI; 1*	AST	ISP	TRN	NSV	ATL; 4	BGS	ONA; 27	MCH; 27	TAL; 23	CLB	HCY	DAR; 24	MAR; 4	**CLT**; 5*		**CAR**; 37	MGR		**NWS**; 2	TWS							42nd	699	
1971	Howard & Egerton Racing	98	Chevy																																											DOV; 2			RCH; 4									42nd	699	

==== Winston Cup Series ====
NASCAR Winston Cup Series results
Year	Team	No.	Make	1	2	3	4	5	6	7	8	9	10	11	12	13	14	15	16	17	18	19	20	21	22	23	24	25	26	27	28	29	30	31	NWCC	Pts	Ref
1972	Owens Racing	6	Dodge	RSD	DAY; 2	RCH	ONT; DNQ	CAR	ATL	BRI	DAR	NWS			CLT; 3	DOV	MCH	RSD	TWS	DAY	BRI	TRN	ATL	TAL	MCH	NSV	DAR	RCH	DOV	MAR	NWS	CLT	CAR	TWS	65th	739	
1972	Owens Racing	6	Plymouth										MAR; 28	TAL																					65th	739	
1973	Ellington Racing	28	Chevy	RSD	DAY	RCH	CAR	BRI	ATL	NWS	DAR; 31	MAR	TAL	NSV	CLT; 24	DOV	TWS	RSD	MCH	DAY	BRI	ATL	TAL	NSV	DAR; 30	RCH	DOV	NWS	MAR	CLT; 37					43rd	903.35	
1973	Donlavey Racing	90	Mercury																												CAR; 8				43rd	903.35	
1974	Ellington Racing	28	Chevy	RSD	DAY; 36	RCH	CAR; 4	BRI	ATL; 11	DAR	NWS	MAR																							26th	293.08	
1974	Donlavey Racing	90	Ford										TAL; 4	NSV	DOV	CLT; 37	RSD	MCH	DAY; 22	BRI; 4	NSV; 6	ATL; 26	POC	TAL; 34	MCH	DAR; 14	RCH; 4	DOV	NWS; 15	MAR	CLT; 30	CAR	ONT		26th	293.08	
1975	Ellington Racing	28	Chevy	RSD	DAY	RCH	CAR	BRI	ATL	NWS	DAR	MAR	TAL	NSV	DOV	CLT; 6	RSD	MCH	DAY	NSV	POC	TAL	MCH	DAR	DOV	NWS	MAR								110th	60	
1975	Ed Gibson	3	Chevy																									CLT; 36	RCH	CAR	BRI	ATL	ONT		110th	60	
1976	Cunningham-Kelley Racing	14	Chevy	RSD	DAY	CAR	RCH	BRI	ATL	NWS	DAR	MAR	TAL	NSV	DOV	CLT; 34	RSD	MCH	DAY	NSV	POC	TAL	MCH	BRI	DAR	RCH	DOV	MAR	NWS	CLT	CAR	ATL	ONT		109th	61	
1981	Bahre Racing	23	Buick	RSD	DAY	RCH	CAR	ATL	BRI	NWS	DAR	MAR	TAL	NSV	DOV	CLT	TWS	RSD	MCH	DAY	NSV	POC	TAL	MCH	BRI	DAR	RCH	DOV	MAR	NWS	CLT; 26	CAR	ATL	RSD	88th	85	
1988	Dingman Brothers Racing	50	Pontiac	DAY	RCH	CAR	ATL	DAR	BRI	NWS	MAR	TAL	CLT	DOV	RSD	POC	MCH	DAY	POC	TAL	GLN	MCH	BRI	DAR	RCH	DOV	MAR	CLT; DNQ	NWS	CAR	PHO	ATL			NA	-	
1989	AAG Racing	34	Buick	DAY; DNQ	CAR	ATL	RCH	DAR	BRI	NWS	MAR	TAL	CLT	DOV	SON	POC	MCH	DAY	POC	TAL	GLN	MCH	BRI	DAR	RCH	DOV	MAR	CLT	NWS	CAR	PHO	ATL			NA	-	
1990	AAG Racing	34	Pontiac	DAY; DNQ	RCH	CAR	ATL	DAR	BRI	NWS	MAR	TAL	CLT	DOV	SON	POC						MCH; DNQ	BRI												70th	140	
1990	AAG Racing	34	Buick														MCH; DNQ																		70th	140	
1990	U.S. Racing	2	Pontiac															DAY; 35	POC	TAL	GLN			DAR; 27											70th	140	
1990	Donlavey Racing	90	Ford																						RCH; 22	DOV	MAR	NWS	CLT	CAR	PHO	ATL			70th	140	
1992	Donlavey Racing	90	Ford	DAY	CAR	RCH; 26	ATL; 18	DAR	BRI	NWS	MAR	TAL; 37	CLT; 36	DOV	SON	POC	MCH; 16	DAY; 20	POC	TAL; 30	GLN	MCH	BRI	DAR	RCH	DOV	MAR	NWS	CLT	CAR	PHO	ATL			41st	592	
1994	Carl Miskotten	82	Ford	DAY	CAR	RCH	ATL	DAR	BRI	NWS	MAR	TAL	SON	CLT	DOV	POC	MCH	DAY	NHA	POC	TAL	IND; DNQ	GLN	MCH	BRI	DAR	RCH	DOV	MAR	NWS	CLT	CAR	PHO	ATL	NA	-	

===== Daytona 500 =====
Year	Team	Manufacturer	Start	Finish
1961	Melvin Black	Pontiac	22	15
1967	K&K Insurance Racing	Dodge	17	33
1968	Friedkin Enterprises	Plymouth	21	32
1969	Owens Racing	Dodge	4	2
1970	Nichels Engineering	Dodge	4	4
1972	Owens Racing	Dodge	6	2
1974	Ellington Racing	Chevrolet	13	36
1989	AAG Racing	Buick	DNQ	
1990	AAG Racing	Pontiac	DNQ	

=== ARCA Hooters SuperCar Series ===
(key) (Bold – Pole position awarded by qualifying time. Italics – Pole position earned by points standings or practice time. * – Most laps led.)

ARCA Hooters SuperCar Series results
Year	Team	No.	Make	1	2	3	4	5	6	7	8	9	10	11	12	13	14	15	16	17	18	19	20	21	AHSC	Pts	Ref
1987	Don Jackson Racing	49	Chevy	DAY	ATL	TAL; 2	DEL	ACS	TOL	ROC	POC; 2	FRS	KIL	TAL; 7	FRS	ISF	INF	DSF	SLM	ATL; 25					36th	-	
1988	Don Jackson Racing	49	Chevy	DAY; 3	ATL	TAL	FRS	PCS	ROC	POC	WIN	KIL	ACS	SLM	POC	TAL	DEL	FRS	ISF	DSF	SLM	ATL			105th	-	
1990		0	Pontiac	DAY; 4*	ATL	KIL																			27th	-	
1990	Garrett Racing	28	Chevy				**TAL**; 3	FRS	POC	KIL	TOL	HAG	POC; 2	**TAL**; 1*							ATL; 1*				27th	-	
1990	AAG Racing	44	Chevy												MCH; 2	ISF	TOL	DSF	WIN	DEL					27th	-	
1991	Garrett Racing	28	Chevy	DAY; 38	ATL; 18*	KIL	TAL	TOL	FRS	POC	MCH; 9*	KIL	FRS	DEL	POC	**TAL**; 1	HPT	MCH	ISF	TOL	DSF	TWS	ATL; 22		34th	805	
1992	Garrett Racing	28	Chevy	DAY; 7*	FIF	TWS	**TAL**; 1*	TOL	KIL		MCH; 29	FRS	KIL	NSH	DEL	POC	HPT	FRS	ISF	TOL	DSF	TWS	SLM	ATL; 7	39th	-	
1992	Garrett Racing	28	Pontiac							POC; 4															39th	-	
1993	Jim Spicuzza	37	Ford	DAY; 31	FIF	TWS	TAL	KIL	CMS	FRS	TOL	POC	MCH	FRS	POC	KIL	ISF	DSF	TOL	SLM	WIN	ATL			118th	-	
