= LeeRoy Yarbrough =

American racing driver (1938–1984)

Lonnie "LeeRoy" Yarbrough
- Yarbrough in 1969
- Born: September 17, 1938; Jacksonville, Florida, U.S.
- Died: December 7, 1984 (aged 46); Jacksonville, Florida, U.S.
- Cause of death: Internal head injuries caused by fall
- Achievements: 1969 Daytona 500 Winner; 1969 Southern 500 Winner; 1969 World 600 Winner; First driver to win NASCAR's "Triple Crown" (1969)
- Awards: Named one of NASCAR's 50 Greatest Drivers (1998); Named one of NASCAR's 75 Greatest Drivers (2023)

NASCAR Cup Series career
- 198 races run over 12 years
- Best finish: 15th (1964)
- First race: 1960 Atlanta 500 (Atlanta)
- Last race: 1972 Old Dominion 500 (Martinsville)
- First win: 1964 Savannah 200 (Savannah)
- Last win: 1970 National 500 (Charlotte)
Wins	Top tens	Poles
14	92	10

NASCAR Grand National East Series career
- 1 race run over 1 year
- First race: 1972 Greenville 200 (Greenville)
- Last race: 1972 Greenville 200 (Greenville)
Wins	Top tens	Poles
0	1	0
- Statistics up to date as of December 18, 2012.

Lonnie "LeeRoy" Yarbrough (September 17, 1938 – December 7, 1984) was an American stock car racer. His best season was 1969 when he won seven races, had 21 finishes in the top-ten and earned $193,211 ($1,487,125.24 when adjusted for inflation). During his entire career from 1960–1972, he competed in 198 races, scoring fourteen wins, 65 finishes in the top-five, 92 finishes in the top-ten, and ten pole positions. Yarbrough also competed in open-wheel racing, making five starts in the USAC Championship cars, including three Indianapolis 500s, with a best finish of third at Trenton Speedway in 1970. His racing number was 98. When asked about his passion, Yarbrough described racing as "what I call my life."

Yarbrough was admitted to a mental institution on March 7, 1980, after trying to kill his mother by strangulation. All attempts to rehabilitate him (both in Florida or in North Carolina) failed and LeeRoy eventually died in 1984 after a fall. In 1990, he was inducted into the National Motorsports Press Association's Hall of Fame at Darlington Raceway in South Carolina. LeeRoy Yarbrough is not related to NASCAR champion Cale Yarborough.

== Career ==
=== Early stock car career ===
Yarbrough grew up on the west side of Jacksonville, Florida, and developed an affinity for speed at an early age. When he was sixteen years-old, Yarbrough put together his first car, a 1934 Ford coupe with a Chrysler engine. When he was 19, Yarbrough found his way to a local dirt track. He won that race at Jacksonville Speedway in the spring of 1957. Racing at Jacksonville Speedway Park on Saturday nights, Yarborough developed a penchant for carrying excess speed into the third turn and diving under any car that was ahead of him. He would then slide through the turn and run the straightway 1" from the concrete wall. The style was evident in many of his last lap wins throughout his career.

Yarbrough started his racing career in NASCAR's lower tier Sportsman division. After winning 11 races, Yarbrough moved up to the more powerful Modifieds and won 83 features in a three-year span.

Yarbrough won two short-track races in the 1964 NASCAR Grand National season, the first year he competed in more than 14 races. Two years later, Yarbrough scored his first superspeedway win at Charlotte. Driving an unsponsored and lightly regarded Dodge Charger owned by Jon Thorne, Yarbrough dominated the race, leading for 450 of the 500 miles (800 km) in the October 16 National 500. Factory-backed rides followed. His Junior Johnson-owned Ford team started out poorly early in the 1968 season. LeeRoy rebounded and won at Atlanta and Trenton.

=== 1969 and later ===
In the 1969 Daytona 500, Yarbrough was trailing Charlie Glotzbach by 11 seconds with ten laps remaining. On the final lap, Yarbrough ducked to the low side to make the pass, but a lapped car was in that lane. Yarbrough dived to the low side in turn 3 to clear the lapped car, nearly clipping the apron. He took the lead from Glotzbach and dashed under the checkered flag a car length in front to win the Daytona 500. Next, he won Darlington's Rebel 400 in the final four laps, then won Charlotte's World 600, lapping the entire field at least twice. He also won the summer 400-miler at Daytona, prevailing in a late-race battle with Buddy Baker, making him the third driver in NASCAR history to sweep both Daytona races. Yarbrough won the summer race at Atlanta International Raceway despite a 102-degree fever. He captured The Southern 500 by passing David Pearson on the last lap. He won by a full lap at Rockingham in October, overcoming a lap deficit when a flat tire sent him into the wall. By season's end, Yarbrough had seven wins to his credit and was named American Driver of The year.

After his successful 1969 season, Yarbrough’s performance record trailed off. A victim of the factory withdrawal, Yarbrough had to scramble to locate rides in Grand National events. He won once in 1970 at Charlotte Motor Speedway, and only entered six races in 1971. In 1972, he accepted a ride in a Ford owned by independent campaigner Bill Seifert. He registered nine top-ten finishes in 18 starts. Yarbrough showed up for Daytona's 1973 Speedweeks, but failed to earn a starting berth for the Daytona 500. He virtually dropped out of sight after that, never again showing up at a NASCAR event.

== Later career and life ==
On April 22, 1970, Yarbrough suffered head injuries while doing tire tests for Goodyear at Texas World Speedway. Yarbrough blew a tire between turns three and four and impacted the wall at over 160 mph. Yarbrough's head hit a roll bar inside the cockpit with such force that it cracked his helmet. He was released from the hospital that evening, and at the time, was not believed to have had a serious head injury. He was picked up at the airport by Cale Yarborough, but later had no memory of the crash, hospital, or meeting with Yarborough.

"I was unconscious for about an hour, but I feel okay today," Yarbrough said a day later. "As tightly as I was strapped in the seat, it's hard for me to believe my body moved that much. The straps made my shoulders black and blue and I'm pretty sore." Days later, Yarbrough qualified eighth at Martinsville but the race was postponed because of rain.

Yarbrough showed well in a few championship car starts in 1970, leading the inaugural California 500 at Ontario Motor Speedway late. Yarbrough was a last-minute entry after Jack Brabham's late withdrawal. After Al Unser retired with 14 laps remaining, Yarbrough inherited the lead. With a margin of two laps over second place, it appeared that Yarbrough would score an unlikely victory. But with eight laps remaining, Yarbrough suffered a broken piston and blew an engine, coasting to a stop in turn four. Yarbrough drew cheers from the crowd as he pushed his car back to the pits. Yarbrough then finished 3rd at Trenton Speedway in 1971.

After competing in three Indianapolis 500s in 1967, '69 and '70, Yarbrough was driving a Dan Gurney Eagle in practice on May 9 for the 1971 Indianapolis 500 when he spun and crashed hard in turn one, suffering head injuries. Cale Yarborough was at the track hospital when LeeRoy was brought in. "He was burned on the hands and neck, and he was woozy from another lick on the head. He was the palest live man I've ever seen." Yarbrough spent the next few months, June through November, in and out of the hospital with many different ailments and memory problems. He was rumoured to have contracted Rocky Mountain spotted fever from a tick bite, and also drank alcohol heavily. He most likely suffered brain trauma from the crashes in Texas and Indianapolis.

In 1977, a court, on recommendation from a psychiatric board, ruled him incompetent to handle his own affairs and he moved in with his mother, Minnie Yarbrough. Yarbrough had an alcohol problem and would sometimes collect empty bottles on the side of the road for the bottle deposits which he would use to buy beer. The alcohol abuse further irritated his brain damage. It was reported that by 1980, his drinking had reduced.

Yarbrough's mother noticed a change in his behavior in early 1980. He began spending most of his time in bed reading racing magazines, rarely leaving his bedroom. On Saturday, February 9, Yarbrough went out for a walk and someone bought him some beers. A policeman friend later brought him to a local hospital where he was released at 2 am. As his mother recalled, "they called me and told me nothing was wrong with him, except that he apparently had a drinking problem. I told them, 'Please keep him there. You don't know LeeRoy. I know my son. He needs help, and it's not the drinking.' But they released him."

On Wednesday, February 13, LeeRoy spent most of the day in bed, with his mother bringing him food. Terry Sweat, Minnie's grandson, had left the house to buy her cigarettes. While doing the dishes after dinner, LeeRoy entered the kitchen and remarked about his mouth, saying "'Mama, look how you've cut my mouth!' I said, Son, I haven't done anything to your mouth. Your mouth is all right.' LeeRoy opened his mouth. I looked at it. It was not cut." He left the kitchen and returned shortly, saying, "Mama, I'm going to do something, and I don't want to do it. I'm going to kill you." Yarbrough would proceed to strangle his mother. Terry Sweat returned and struck Yarbrough with a jelly jar until he released his mother. When police arrived, LeeRoy struck an officer in the face and needed several firefighters to subdue him.

Police arrested Yarbrough with charges of first-degree attempted murder for trying to kill his 65-year-old mother, plus assault on a police officer. Yarbrough was committed to the Florida State Hospital at Chattahoochee by Judge Hudson Oliff of Jacksonville on March 7, 1980. Judge Oliff ruled that Mr. Yarbrough was not guilty of attempted murder because he was unable to distinguish right from wrong at the time of the incident.

Yarbrough had no memory of the assault and was unaware of why he was imprisoned. For almost a month, his mother would not tell him the real reason he was in jail. Finally in early March, he received a newspaper that explained his charges. He called his mother in disbelief, saying, "Mama, is it true what the paper said? Mama, I wouldn't hurt you for nothing in this world."

In March 1981, Junior Johnson and auto racing chaplain Bill Baird had LeeRoy transferred to a mental hospital in Asheville, North Carolina and a fund was set up to pay for his expenses. Johnson said, "We haven't given up on getting LeeRoy treatment that will help him." Baird said that although the "prognosis originally was not good, the doctors who examined him are saying now that with continuing treatment at Asheville, his chances are moderate to good for significant progress. We’re told there’s a 25-30% chance he can function again in society." The Rod Osterlund Racing team, which fielded cars for defending champion Dale Earnhardt, offered Yarbrough a job with their team once his treatment was completed. Junior Johnson was also prepared to give Yarbrough a job. Unfortunately, staff at the facility determined Yarbrough's brain damage was too severe for treatment and he returned to a Florida facility.

== Death ==
While in the hospital on December 6, 1984, Yarbrough had a violent seizure and fell over striking his head. He fell unconscious immediately. He was rushed to Jacksonville's University Hospital where he died the morning of December 7, 1984. The doctors said he died of internal bleeding in the brain.

Upon Yarbrough's death, Junior Johnson said, "People should always have respect for LeeRoy. He'd have been among our greats if he hadn't been so unlucky to hit the walls a time or two too many."

== Motorsports career results ==
=== American open-wheel racing ===
(key) (Races in bold indicate pole position)

==== USAC Championship Car ====
Year	1	2	3	4	5	6	7	8	9	10	11	12	13	14	15	16	17	18	19	20	21	22	23	24	25	26	27	28	Pos	Points
1966	PHX	TRE	INDY; DNQ	MIL	LAN	ATL	PIP	IRP	LAN	SPR	MIL	DUQ	ISF	TRE	SAC	PHX													NC	0
1967	PHX	TRE	INDY; 27	MIL	LAN	PIP	MOS	MOS	IRP	LAN	MTR	MTR	SPR	MIL	DUQ	ISF	TRE	SAC	HAN	PHX	RIV								NC	0
1968	HAN	LVG	PHX	TRE	INDY; DNQ	MIL	MOS	MOS	LAN	PIP	CDR	NAZ	IRP	IRP	LAN	LAN	MTR	MTR	SPR	MIL	DUQ	ISF	TRE	SAC	MCH	HAN	PHX	RIV	NC	0
1969	PHX	HAN	INDY; 23	MIL	LAN	PIP	CDR	NAZ	TRE	IRP	IRP	MIL	SPR	DOV	DUQ	ISF	BRN	BRN	TRE	SAC	KEN	KEN	PHX	RIV					NC	0
1970	PHX	SON	TRE	INDY; 19	MIL	LAN	CDR	MCH	IRP	SPR	MIL	ONT; 8	DUQ	ISF	SED	TRE	SAC	PHX											35th	250
1971	RAF	RAF	PHX	TRE; 3	INDY; DNQ	MIL	POC	MCH	MIL	ONT	TRE	PHX																	23rd	280

===== Indianapolis 500 =====
Year	Car number	Start	Qual	Rank	Finish	Laps 500	Led	Retired
1967	67	26	163.066	24	27	87	0	Crash NC
1969	67	8	168.075	8	23	65	0	Split Header
1970	27	13	166.559	19	19	107	0	Turbo Gear
**Totals**						259	0	

Starts	3
Poles	0
Front Row	0
Wins	0
Top 5	0
Top 10	0
Retired	3

=== NASCAR ===
(key) (Bold – Pole position awarded by qualifying time. Italics – Pole position earned by points standings or practice time. * – Most laps led. ** – All laps led.)

==== Grand National Series ====
NASCAR Grand National Series results
Year	Team	No.	Make	1	2	3	4	5	6	7	8	9	10	11	12	13	14	15	16	17	18	19	20	21	22	23	24	25	26	27	28	29	30	31	32	33	34	35	36	37	38	39	40	41	42	43	44	45	46	47	48	49	50	51	52	53	54	55	56	57	58	59	60	61	62	NGNC	Pts	Ref
1960			Chevy	CLT	CLB	DAY	DAY	DAY	CLT	NWS	PHO	CLB	MAR	HCY	WIL	BGS	GPS	AWS	DAR	PIF	HBO	RCH	HMS	CLT	BGS	DAY	HEI	MAB	MBS	ATL	BIR	NSV	AWS	PIF	CLB	SBO	BGS	DAR	HCY	CSF	GSP	HBO	MAR	NWS	CLT; DNQ	RCH																				137th	84	
1960		82	Chevy																																												ATL; 33																			137th	84	
1962	Lewis Osborne	97	Chevy	CON	AWS	DAY	DAY	DAY	CON	AWS	SVH	HBO	RCH	CLB	NWS	GPS	MBS	MAR	BGS	BRI	RCH	HCY	CON	DAR; 30	PIF		ATL; 17	BGS	AUG; 13	RCH	SBO					AUG; 19	SVH; 20	MBS	BRI; 42	CHT	NSV	HUN	AWS	STR	BGS	PIF																				36th	4240	
1962	Nichels Engineering	39	Pontiac																							CLT; 12						DAY; 25	CLB	ASH	GPS																															36th	4240	
1962	Ralph Smith	179	Chevy																																												VAL; 5																			36th	4240	
1962	McMillion Racing	83	Pontiac																																													DAR; 27	HCY	RCH	DTS	AUG	MAR	NWS												36th	4240	
1962	Jimmy Baker	81	Mercury																																																				CLT; 43	ATL; 37										36th	4240	
1963	Jimmy Baker	81	Mercury	BIR; 20	GGS	THS	RSD	DAY																																																										26th	7872	
1963	E. A. McQuaig	30	Pontiac						DAY; 11																									SVH; 6	DTS	BGS	ASH	OBS	BRR	BRI	GPS	NSV	CLB	AWS	PIF	BGS	ONA																			26th	7872	
1963	E. A. McQuaig	39	Pontiac							DAY; 13	PIF	AWS	HBO	ATL; 7	HCY														CLT; 33	BIR	ATL	DAY	MBS																																	26th	7872	
1963	Lou Sidoit	69	Mercury													BRI; 5						MAR; 17																																												26th	7872	
1963	Lyle Stelter	55	Mercury														**AUG**; 9	RCH	GPS	SBO	BGS		NWS; 26	CLB; 10	THS																																									26th	7872	
1963	W. M. Harrison	71	Chevy																							DAR; 16	ODS	RCH																																						26th	7872	
1963	Don Harrison	92	Ford																																													DAR; 29	HCY	RCH	MAR	DTS	NWS	THS												26th	7872	
1963	Ray Osborne	92	Ford																																																				CLT; 34	SBO	HBO	RSD								26th	7872	
1964	E. A. McQuaig	39	Pontiac	CON	AUG	JSP; 20																																																												15th	16172	
1964		90	Plymouth				SVH; 17	RSD	DAY																																																									15th	16172	
1964	David Walker	89	Plymouth							DAY; 21	DAY	RCH				ATL; 22																																																		15th	16172	
1964	Roscoe Sanders	71	Plymouth										BRI; 11																																																					15th	16172	
1964	Louis Weathersbee	45	Plymouth											GPS; 4	BGS		AWS; 8	HBO; 14	PIF; 14	CLB; 3			SVH; 1		LGY; 9	HCY; 4	SBO		GPS; 1	ASH		CON; 12	NSV	CHT	BIR	VAL; 2*	PIF; 2		ODS; 12	OBS; 6		ISP; 15					MBS; 3	AWS	DTS	ONA	CLB	BGS	STR											AUG; 23	JAC	15th	16172	
1964	Paul Clayton	70	Pontiac																		NWS; 26	MAR																																												15th	16172	
1964	Fox Racing	03	Dodge																					DAR; 8				CLT; 26			ATL; 11							DAY; 11			BRR; 18		GLN; 2	LIN; 18	BRI; 4	NSV								DAR; 17	HCY	RCH	ODS	HBO	MAR; 27	SVH	NWS	CLT; 5	HAR			15th	16172	
1965	Fox Racing	3	Dodge	RSD	DAY; 12	DAY	DAY; DNQ	PIF	AWS	RCH	HBO	ATL	GPS	NWS	MAR	CLB	BRI	DAR	LGY	BGS	HCY																																													37th	5852	
1965	Fox Racing	3	Chevy																			CLT; 14	CCF	ASH	HAR	NSV	BIR	ATL; 34	GPS	MBS	VAL	DAY; 34	ODS	OBS	ISP	GLN	BRI	NSV	CCF									DAR; 27	HCY						CLT; 5	HBO	CAR	DTS								37th	5852	
1965	Gary Weaver	10	Ford																																					AWS; 19			AUG; 4	CLB; 6	DTS	BLV	BGS																			37th	5852	
1965	Gene Hobby	99	Dodge																																						SMR; 21																									37th	5852	
1965	Sam Fogle	31	Ford																																							PIF; 12								LIN; 23	ODS; 25															37th	5852	
1965	Petty Enterprises	43	Plymouth																																																	RCH; 34	MAR	NWS												37th	5852	
1966	Jon Thorne	12	Dodge	AUG	RSD	DAY	DAY; 4	DAY; 8	CAR; 32	BRI	ATL; 21	HCY	CLB	GPS	BGS	NWS	MAR	DAR; 29	LGY	MGR	MON	RCH	CLT	DTS	ASH	PIF	SMR	AWS	BLV	GPS	**DAY**; 24	ODS	BRR	OXF	FON	ISP	BRI	SMR	NSV	ATL; 43	CLB	AWS	BLV	BGS	**DAR**; 8	HCY	RCH	HBO	MAR	NWS	CLT; 1*	CAR; 39														26th	10528	
1967		33	Chevy	AUG; 20																																																														37th	7012	
1967	Jon Thorne	12	Dodge		RSD; 34	DAY; 1	DAY	DAY; 34	AWS	BRI; 24	GPS	BGS	ATL; 30	CLB	HCY	NWS	MAR	SVH	RCH	DAR	BLV	LGY	CLT	ASH	MGR	SMR	BIR																																							37th	7012	
1967	Bud Moore Engineering	16	Mercury																									CAR; 18	GPS	MGY	DAY; 6	TRN	OXF	FDA	ISP	BRI; 16	SMR	NSV	ATL; 3	BGS	CLB	SVH	DAR; 39	HCY	RCH	BLV	HBO	MAR; 35																		37th	7012	
1967	Junior Johnson & Associates	26	Ford																																														NWS; 3	CLT; DNQ	CAR; 14	AWS; 27														37th	7012	
1968	Junior Johnson & Associates	26	Ford	**MGR**; 17	MGY; 20	RSD; 37		BRI; 3	RCH						MAR; 4			**DAR**; 5	BLV	LGY																																														16th	1894	
1968	Junior Johnson & Associates	26	Mercury				DAY; 2			**ATL**; 2	HCY	GPS																																																						16th	1894	
1968	Lyle Stelter	56	Ford										CLB; 9																								CLB; 3	BGS	AWS																											16th	1894	
1968	Junior Johnson & Associates	98	Ford											CLB; 5												**CAR**; 28	GPS					**TRN**; 1*	**BRI**; 32	SMR	NSV							DAR; 27	HCY	RCH	BLV	HBO	MAR; 3			CLT; 41	CAR; 3															16th	1894	
1968	Lyle Stelter	55	Ford													AUG; 15	AWS																																																	16th	1894	
1968	Junior Johnson & Associates	98	Mercury																		CLT; 3	ASH	MGR	SMR	BIR			DAY; 2	ISP	OXF	FDA					ATL; 1*												NWS; 3	AUG																	16th	1894	
1968	Lyle Stelter	56	Mercury																																					SBO; 20	LGY; 23											JFC; 5														16th	1894	
1969	Lyle Stelter	56	Mercury	MGR; 16	MGY																																																													16th	2712	
1969	Junior Johnson & Associates	98	Mercury			RSD; 6							ATL; 11	CLB	HCY	GPS	RCH	NWS; 2	MAR; 4	AWS	DAR; 1	BLV	LGY	CLT; 1*	MGR	SMR	MCH; 4*	KPT	GPS	NCF																																				16th	2712	
1969	Junior Johnson & Associates	98	Ford				DAY; 9	DAY	DAY; 1	CAR; 23	AUG	BRI; 2																			DAY; 1*	DOV; 15	TPN			BRI; 11	NSV	SMR	ATL; 1*	MCH; 8	SBO	BGS	AWS; 22	DAR; 1*	HCY	RCH; 10	TAL; Wth	CLB	MAR; 20	NWS; 4	CLT; 38	SVH; 4	AUG; 4	CAR; 1*	JFC; 4	MGR; 29	TWS; 10									16th	2712	
1969	DeWitt Racing	14	Ford																															TRN; 5	BLV																															16th	2712	
1970	Junior Johnson & Associates	98	Ford	RSD; 3	DAY; 3	DAY	DAY; 9	RCH	CAR; 29	SVH	ATL; 4	BRI	TAL	NWS; 3	CLB	DAR; 26	BLV	LGY				MCH; 4	RSD	HCY	KPT	GPS					BRI; 2	SMR	**NSV**; 23															MAR; 7	MGR																	43rd	625	
1970	Junior Johnson & Associates	98	Mercury																CLT; 29	SMR							DAY; 25	AST	TPN					ATL; 3	CLB	ONA	MCH; 7	TAL	BGS	SBO	DAR	HCY	RCH	DOV	NCF	NWS	CLT; 1*			CAR; 29	LGY															43rd	625	
1970	Matthews Racing	27	Ford																		**MAR**; 26																																													43rd	625	
1970	Donlavey Racing	90	Ford																											TRN; 30																																				43rd	625	
1971	Junior Johnson & Associates	98	Mercury	RSD	DAY; 4	DAY	DAY; 34	ONT; 6	RCH	CAR; 6	HCY	BRI																																																						73rd	98	
1971	Seifert Racing	45	Ford										ATL; 28	CLB																																																				73rd	98	
1971		44													GPS; DNQ	SMR	NWS	MAR	DAR	SBO	TAL	ASH	KPT	CLT	DOV	MCH	RSD	HOU	GPS	DAY	BRI	AST	ISP	TRN	NSV	ATL	BGS	ONA	MCH	TAL	CLB	HCY	DAR	MAR																						73rd	98	
1971	Howard & Egerton Racing	98	Chevy																																										CLT; 34	DOV	CAR	MGR	RCH	NWS	TWS															73rd	98	

==== Winston Cup Series ====
NASCAR Winston Cup Series results
Year	Team	No.	Make	1	2	3	4	5	6	7	8	9	10	11	12	13	14	15	16	17	18	19	20	21	22	23	24	25	26	27	28	29	30	31	NWCC	Pts	Ref
1972	Nichels Engineering	99	Plymouth	RSD	DAY; DNQ	RCH	ONT																												34th	2157.5	
1972	Seifert Racing	45	Ford					CAR; 4	ATL; 9	BRI; 4		NWS; 6							TWS; 41		BRI; 19	TRN		TAL; 33	MCH	NSV; 28				MAR; 30	NWS	CLT	CAR	TWS	34th	2157.5	
1972	Bud Moore Engineering	15	Ford								DAR; 26																								34th	2157.5	
1972	Seifert Racing	45	Mercury										MAR; 23	TAL; 7	CLT; 5	DOV; 3	MCH; 28	RSD		DAY; 6															34th	2157.5	
1972	Donlavey Racing	90	Ford																				ATL; 5				DAR; 39	RCH	DOV						34th	2157.5	
1973				RSD	DAY; DNQ	RCH	CAR	BRI	ATL	NWS	DAR	MAR	TAL	NSV	CLT	DOV	TWS	RSD	MCH	DAY	BRI	ATL	TAL	NSV	DAR	RCH	DOV	NWS	MAR	CLT	CAR				–	–	

===== Daytona 500 =====
Year	Team	Manufacturer	Start	Finish
1963	E. A. McQuaig	Pontiac	22	13
1965	Fox Racing	Dodge	DNQ	
1966	Jon Thorne	Dodge	8	8
1967	Jon Thorne	Dodge	3	34
1968	Junior Johnson & Associates	Mercury	3	2
1969	Junior Johnson & Associates	Ford	19	**1**
1970	Junior Johnson & Associates	Ford	5	9
1971	Junior Johnson & Associates	Mercury	7	34
1972	Nichels Engineering	Plymouth	DNQ	
1973			DNQ	

==== Grand National East Series ====
NASCAR Grand National East Series results
Year	Team	No.	Make	1	2	3	4	5	6	7	8	9	10	11	12	13	14	15	NGNEC	Pts	Ref
1972	Seifert Racing	45	Ford	JSP	HCY	GPS; 4	CLB	NSV	SMR	ONA	MBS; QL^{†}								NA	NA	
1972	Unknown	-	Unknown									AST; Wth	ISP	CLB	HCY	BGS	LPS	CLB	NA	NA	
^{†} – Qualified but replaced by Elmo Langley

Achievements
Preceded by Cale Yarborough	Daytona 500 Winner; 1969	Succeeded by Pete Hamilton
