= 1969 NASCAR Grand National Series =

Seasons
- ← 1968 1970 →

The 1969 NASCAR Grand National Series was the 21st season of professional stock car racing in the United States. The season, which began on November 17, 1968 at Middle Georgia Raceway near Byron, Georgia, was contested over 54 races. The season ended at Texas World Speedway near College Station, Texas, on December 7, 1969. David Pearson was the drivers' champion for the third time in four years. Dick Brooks was the Rookie of the Year.

== Results ==
No	Date	Race	Track	Track type		Pole Position	Winning Driver	Purse (US$)	Avg. Speed (mph)	Report
No	Date	Race	Track	Surface	Length (miles)	Pole Position	Winning Driver	Purse (US$)	Avg. Speed (mph)	Report
1	11/17/1968	Georgia 500	Middle Georgia Raceway (Byron, GA)	Paved	0.500	David Pearson	Richard Petty	16,935	85.121	Report
2	12/8/1968	Alabama 200	Montgomery Motor Speedway (Montgomery, AL)	Paved	0.500	Richard Petty	Bobby Allison	4,740	73.200	Report
3	2/1/1969	Motor-Trend 500	Riverside International Raceway (Riverside, CA)	Road Course	2.700	A. J. Foyt	Richard Petty	79,660	105.498	Report
4	2/20/1969	Twin 125 #1	Daytona International Speedway (Daytona Beach, FL)	Paved	2.500	Buddy Baker	David Pearson	8,615	152.181	
5	2/20/1969	Twin 125 #2	Daytona International Speedway (Daytona Beach, FL)	Paved	2.500	Bobby Isaac	Bobby Isaac	8,625	151.688	
6	2/23/1969	Daytona 500	Daytona International Speedway (Daytona Beach, FL)	Paved	2.500	Buddy Baker	LeeRoy Yarbrough	174,670	157.950	Report
7	3/9/1969	Carolina 500	North Carolina Motor Speedway (Rockingham, NC)	Paved	1,000	David Pearson	David Pearson	68,090	102.569	
8	3/16/1969		Augusta International Raceway (Hephzibah, GA)	Paved	0.500	Bobby Isaac	David Pearson	6,975	77.586	
9	3/23/1969	Southeastern 500	Bristol International Speedway (Bristol, TN)	Paved	0.500	Bobby Isaac	Bobby Allison	24,860	81.455	
10	3/30/1969	Atlanta 500	Atlanta Motor Speedway (Hampton, GA)	Paved	1.500	Charlie Glotzbach	Cale Yarborough	89,360	132.759	
11	4/3/1969	Columbia 200	Columbia Speedway (Cayce, SC)	Dirt	0.500	Bobby Isaac	Bobby Isaac	7,075	68.558	
12	4/6/1969	Hickory 250	Hickory Speedway (Hickory, NC)	Paved	0.400	Bobby Isaac	Bobby Isaac	9,755	79.086	
13	4/8/1969	Greenville 200	Greenville-Pickens Speedway (Easley, SC)	Dirt	0.500	David Pearson	Bobby Isaac	6,975	64.389	
14	4/13/1969	Richmond 250	Richmond Raceway (Richmond, VA)	Paved	0.500	David Pearson	David Pearson	18,900	73.752	Report
15	4/20/1969	Gwyn Staley Memorial	North Wilkesboro Speedway (North Wilkesboro, NC)	Paved	0.625	Bobby Isaac	Bobby Allison	25,025	95.268	
16	4/27/1969	Virginia 500	Martinsville Speedway (Manassas, VA)	Paved	0.500	Bobby Allison	Richard Petty	40,885	64.405	
17	5/4/1969	Fireball 300	Asheville Weaverville Speedway (Weaverville, NC)	Paved	0.500	Bobby Allison	Bobby Isaac	12,050	72.581	
18	5/10/1969	Rebel 400	Darlington Raceway (Darlington, SC)	Paved	1.375	Cale Yarborough	LeeRoy Yarbrough	57,480	131.572	
19	5/16/1969	Beltsville 300	Beltsville Speedway (Beltsville, MD)	Paved	0.500	Bobby Isaac	Bobby Isaac	12,615	73.059	
20	5/17/1969	Tidewater 375	Langley Field Speedway (Hampton, VA)	Paved	0.400	David Pearson	David Pearson	13,125	75.789	
21	5/25/1969	Charlotte World 600	Charlotte Motor Speedway (Concord, NC)	Paved	1.500	Donnie Allison	LeeRoy Yarbrough	132,110	134.361	Report
22	6/1/1969	Macon 300	Middle Georgia Raceway (Byron, GA)	Paved	0.500	David Pearson	Bobby Isaac	13,125	73.717	
23	6/5/1969	Maryville 300	Smoky Mountain Raceway (Maryville, TN)	Paved	0.500	David Pearson	Bobby Isaac	10,400	81.706	
24	6/15/1969	Motor State 500	Michigan International Speedway (Cambridge Twp., MI)	Paved	2.000	Donnie Allison	Cale Yarborough	73,548	139.254	Report
25	6/19/1969	Kingsport 250	Kingsport Speedway (Kingsport, TN)	Paved	0.400	Bobby Isaac	Richard Petty	7,175	73.619	
26	6/21/1969	Greenville 200	Greenville-Pickens Speedway (Easley, SC)	Dirt	0.500	Bobby Isaac	Bobby Isaac	6,975	61.813	Report
27	6/26/1969	North State 200	State Fairgrounds Speedway (Raleigh, NC)	Dirt	0.500	Bobby Isaac	David Pearson	7,375	65.418	
28	7/4/1969	Firecracker 400	Daytona International Speedway (Daytona Beach, FL)	Paved	2.500	Cale Yarborough	LeeRoy Yarbrough	75,380	160.875	
29	7/6/1969	Mason-Dixon 300	Dover Motor Speedway (Dover, DE)	Paved	1.000	David Pearson	Richard Petty	23,605	115.772	
30	7/10/1969	Thompson 200	Thompson Speedway (Thompson, CT	Paved	0.625	David Pearson	David Pearson	16,350	89.498	
31	7/13/1969	Northern 300	Trenton Speedway (Trenton, NJ)	Paved	1.500	Bobby Isaac	David Pearson	20,990	121.008	
32	7/15/1969	Maryland 300	Beltsville Speedway (Beltsville, MD)	Paved	0.500	Richard Petty	Richard Petty	13,125	77.253	
33	7/20/1969	Volunteer 500	Bristol International Speedway (Bristol, TN)	Paved	0.527	Cale Yarborough	David Pearson	27,685	79.737	Report
34	7/26/1969	Nashville 400	Nashville Superspeedway (Nashville, TN)	Paved	0.500	Richard Petty	Richard Petty	14,500	78.740	
35	7/27/1969	Smoky 200	Smoky Mountain Raceway (Maryville, TN)	Paved	0.500	David Pearson	Richard Petty	7,175	82.417	
36	8/10/1969	Dixie 500	Atlanta Motor Speedway (Hampton, GA)	Paved	1.500	Cale Yarborough	LeeRoy Yarbrough	83,385	133.001	Report
37	8/17/1969	Yankee 600	Michigan International Speedway (Cambridge Twp., MI)	Paved	2.000	David Pearson	David Pearson	89,750	115.508	
38	8/21/1969	South Boston 100	South Boston Speedway (South Boston, VA)	Paved	0.375	Bobby Isaac	Bobby Isaac	7,375	76.906	
39	8/22/1969	Myers Brothers Stock Car Spectacle	Bowman Gray Stadium (Winston-Salem, NC)	Paved	0.250	Richard Petty	Richard Petty	6,975	47.458	Report
40	8/24/1969	Western North Carolina 500	Asheville Weaverville Speedway (Weaverville, NC)	Paved	0.500	Bobby Isaac	Bobby Isaac	17,460	80.45	
41	9/1/1969	Southern 500	Darlington Raceway (Darlington, SC)	Paved	1.375	Cale Yarborough	LeeRoy Yarbrough	87,490	105.612	
42	9/5/1969	Buddy Shuman Memorial	Hickory Speedway (Hickory, NC)	Paved	0.400	Bobby Isaac	Bobby Isaac	10,100	80.519	
43	9/7/1969	Capital City 400	Richmond Raceway (Richmond, VA)	Paved	0.542	Richard Petty	Bobby Allison	21,480	76.388	
44	9/14/1969	Talladega 500	Talladega Superspeedway (Lincoln, AL)	Paved	2.660	Bobby Isaac	Richard Brickhouse	91,950	153.778	Report
45	9/18/1969	Sandlapper 200	Columbia Speedway (Cayce, SC)	Dirt	0.500	Richard Petty	Bobby Isaac	6,975	70.23	Report
46	9/28/1969	Old Dominion 500	Martinsville Speedway (Manassas, VA)	Paved	0.526	David Pearson	Richard Petty	41,795	63.127	
47	10/5/1969	North Wilkesboro 400	North Wilkesboro Speedway (North Wilkesboro, NC)	Paved	0.625	Bobby Isaac	David Pearson	24,875	93.429	
48	10/12/1969	National 500	Charlotte Motor Speedway (Concord, NC)	Paved	1.500	Cale Yarborough	Donnie Allison	94,440	131.271	Report
49	10/17/1969		Savannah Speedway (Savannah, GA)	Paved	0.500	Bobby Isaac	Bobby Isaac	7,675	78.482	
50	10/19/1969		Augusta International Raceway (Hephzibah, GA)	Paved	0.500	Bobby Isaac	Bobby Isaac	7,675	78.740	
51	10/26/1969	American 500	North Carolina Motor Speedway (Rockingham, NC)	Paved	1.017	Charlie Glotzbach	LeeRoy Yarbrough	71,005	111.938	Report
52	11/2/1969	Jeffco 200	Jefco Speedway (Jefferson, GA)	Paved	0.500	David Pearson	Bobby Isaac	8,075	85.106	
53	11/9/1969	Georgia 500	Middle Georgia Raceway (Byron, GA)	Paved	0.548	Bobby Isaac	Bobby Allison	19,075	81.079	Report
54	12/7/1969	Texas 500	Texas World Speedway (College Station, TX)	Paved	2.000	Buddy Baker	Bobby Isaac	71,485	144.277	Report

== Driver Standings ==
No	Driver	Points	Starts	Poles	Wins	Top 5s	Top 10s	Laps	Laps Led	$ Earnings
1	David Pearson	4,170	51	14	11	42	44	14,270	3,040	229,760
2	Richard Petty	3,813	50	6	10	31	38	12,589	2,777	129,906
3	James Hylton	3,750	52	0	0	27	39	13,540	161	114,416
4	Neil Castles	3,530	52	0	0	14	30	13,136	29	54,367
5	Elmo Langley	3,383	52	0	0	13	28	12,531	40	73,092
6	Bobby Isaac	3,301	50	19	17	29	33	12,308	5,053	92,074
7	John Sears	3,166	52	0	0	17	27	11,620	18	52,281
8	Jabe Thomas	3,103	51	0	0	0	12	12,025	0	44,989
9	Wendell Scott	3,015	51	0	0	0	11	11,856	0	47,451
10	Cecil Gordon	3,002	51	0	0	1	8	10,745	0	39,679
11	E. J. Trivette	2,988	49	0	0	0	15	11,110	0	35,896
12	Bill Champion	2,813	49	0	0	1	10	10,195	0	33,656
13	Bill Seifert	2,765	50	0	0	1	15	9,728	0	44,361
14	J. D. McDuffie	2,741	50	0	0	0	12	10,173	0	30,861
15	Ben Arnold	2,736	48	0	0	0	8	10,334	0	33,256
16	LeeRoy Yarbrough	2,712	30	0	7	16	21	8,190	1,156	193,211
17	Henley Gray	2,517	48	0	0	0	5	8,954	0	29,335
18	Earl Brooks	2,454	49	0	0	1	6	8,719	0	34,793
19	Dave Marcis	2,348	37	0	0	3	11	7,099	22	32,383
20	Bobby Allison	2,055	27	1	5	13	15	6,445	1,252	69,483
21	Dick Brooks	1,780	28	0	0	3	12	6,041	2	28,187
22	Buddy Baker	1,769	18	2	0	9	11	4,181	767	63,525
23	Cale Yarborough	1,715	19	6	2	7	8	4,341	946	75,065
24	Donnie Allison	1,662	16	2	1	10	11	3,893	400	78,055
25	Richard Brickhouse	1,660	24	0	1	2	9	3,629	34	45,637
26	G. C. Spencer	1,562	26	0	0	4	8	4,823	0	21,675
27	Ed Negre	1,465	31	0	0	0	4	4,556	0	15,615
28	Friday Hassler	1,421	18	0	0	0	7	4,607	3	18,000
29	Frank Warren	1,299	23	0	0	0	1	3,343	0	15,677
30	Hoss Ellington	1,210	15	0	0	0	4	2,988	0	16,552
31	Roy Tyner	1,191	21	0	0	0	1	3,285	0	12,317
32	Ed Hessert	1,113	16	0	0	0	4	2,635	1	17,690
33	Buddy Arrington	1,099	16	0	0	2	6	3,758	0	12,975
34	Dick Johnson	1,055	22	0	0	0	4	3,803	0	11,477
35	Buddy Young	981	21	0	0	1	6	4,510	0	15,542
36	Dub Simpson	959	20	0	0	0	0	2,923	0	12,915
37	Charlie Glotzbach	944	12	1	0	5	6	2,823	171	37,515
38	Roy Mayne	924	13	0	0	0	0	2,855	0	10,100
39	Wayne Smith	922	16	0	0	0	2	2,692	0	10,610
40	Paul Goldsmith	892	11	0	0	4	5	1,999	20	22,850
41	Don Tarr	855	12	0	0	0	3	1754	6	13,950
42	Ken Meisenhelder	627	16	0	0	0	0	1832	0	5,630
43	Pete Hazelwood	598	16	0	0	0	1	2367	0	4,390
44	Sonny Hutchins	535	8	0	0	2	2	1694	0	9,565
45	Wayne Gillette	509	16	0	0	0	0	887	0	6,127
46	Paul Dean Holt	485	14	0	0	0	0	1196	0	4,442
47	Johnny Halford	465	8	0	0	0	0	1881	0	4,200
48	Ray Elder	433	4	0	0	0	4	642	0	7,200
49	John Kennedy	417	8	0	0	0	0	1084	0	6,462
50	Dick Poling	408	12	0	0	0	0	1305	0	5,467
