= 1970 NASCAR Grand National Series =

American motorsport season

Seasons
- ← 1969 1971 →

The 1970 NASCAR Grand National Series season began on Sunday January 18 and ended on Sunday November 22. Bobby Isaac was the champion of the series as NASCAR transitioned from the Grand National era to the Winston Cup era. Only one foreigner was racing that year, a Canadian named Frog Fagan (who finished 96th in the championship standings). It was also the last NASCAR national touring series season to feature a dirt track race until the 2013 NASCAR Camping World Truck Series, and the last time the Cup series raced on dirt until the 2021 NASCAR Cup Series.

== Schedule ==
No.	Race title	Track	Date	Winner
1	Motor Trend 500	Riverside International Raceway, Riverside	January 18	A.J. Foyt
2	125 Mile Qualifying Races	Daytona International Speedway, Daytona Beach	February 19	Cale Yarborough
3	125 Mile Qualifying Races	Daytona International Speedway, Daytona Beach	February 19	Charlie Glotzbach
4	Daytona 500	Daytona International Speedway, Daytona Beach	February 22	Pete Hamilton
5	Richmond 500	Richmond Fairgrounds Raceway, Richmond	March 1	James Hylton
6	Carolina 500	North Carolina Motor Speedway, Rockingham	March 8	Richard Petty
7	Savannah 200	Savannah Speedway, Savannah	March 15	Richard Petty
8	Atlanta 500	Atlanta International Raceway, Hampton	March 29	Bobby Allison
9	Southeastern 500	Bristol International Speedway, Bristol	April 5	Donnie Allison
10	Alabama 500	Alabama International Motor Speedway, Talladega	April 12	Pete Hamilton
11	Gwyn Staley 400	North Wilkesboro Speedway, North Wilkesboro	April 18	Richard Petty
12	Columbia 200	Columbia Speedway, Columbia (dirt track)	April 30	Richard Petty
13	Rebel 400	Darlington Raceway, Darlington	May 9	David Pearson
14	Beltsville 300	Beltsville Speedway, Beltsville	May 15	Bobby Isaac
15	Tidewater 300	Langley Speedway, Hampton	May 18	Bobby Isaac
16	World 600	Charlotte Motor Speedway, Concord	May 24	Donnie Allison
17	Maryville 200	Smoky Mountain Raceway, Maryville	May 28	Bobby Isaac
18	Virginia 500	Martinsville Speedway, Ridgeway	May 31	Bobby Isaac
19	Motor State 400	Michigan International Speedway, Brooklyn	June 7	Cale Yarborough
20	Falstaff 400	Riverside International Raceway, Riverside	June 14	Richard Petty
21	Hickory 276	Hickory Speedway, Hickory	June 20	Bobby Isaac
22	Kingsport 100	Kingsport Speedway, Kingsport	June 26	Richard Petty
23	Greenville 200	Greenville-Pickens Speedway, Greenville	June 27	Bobby Isaac
24	Firecracker 400	Daytona International Speedway, Daytona Beach	July 4	Donnie Allison
25	Albany-Saratoga 250	Albany-Saratoga Speedway, Malta	July 7	Richard Petty
26	Thompson 200	Thompson Speedway, Thompson	July 9	Bobby Isaac
27	Schaefer 300	Trenton Speedway, Trenton	July 12	Richard Petty
28	Volunteer 500	Bristol International Speedway, Bristol	July 19	Bobby Allison
29	East Tennessee 200	Smoky Mountain Raceway, Maryville	July 24	Richard Petty
30	Nashville 420	Nashville Speedway, Nashville	July 25	Bobby Isaac
31	Dixie 500	Atlanta International Raceway, Hampton	August 2	Richard Petty
32	Sandlapper 200	Columbia Speedway, Columbia (dirt track)	August 6	Bobby Isaac
33	West Virginia 500	International Raceway Park, Ona	August 11	Richard Petty
34	Yankee 400	Michigan International Speedway, Brooklyn	August 16	Charlie Glotzbach
35	Talladega 500	Alabama International Motor Speedway, Talladega	August 23	Pete Hamilton
36	Myers Brothers 250	Bowman Gray Stadium, Winston-Salem	August 28	Richard Petty
37	Halifax County 100	South Boston Speedway, South Boston	August 29	Richard Petty
38	Southern 500	Darlington Raceway, Darlington	September 7	Buddy Baker
39	Buddy Shuman 276	Hickory Speedway, Hickory	September 11	Bobby Isaac
40	Capital City 500	Richmond Fairgrounds Raceway, Richmond	September 13	Richard Petty
41	Mason-Dixon 300	Dover Downs International Speedway, Dover	September 20	Richard Petty
42	Home State 200	North Carolina State Fairgrounds, Raleigh (dirt track)	September 30	Richard Petty
43	Wilkes 400	North Wilkesboro Speedway, North Wilkesboro	October 4	Bobby Isaac
44	National 500	Charlotte Motor Speedway, Concord	October 11	LeeRoy Yarbrough
45	Old Dominion 500	Martinsville Speedway, Ridgeway	October 18	Richard Petty
46	Georgia 500	Middle Georgia Raceway, Macon	November 8	Richard Petty
47	American 500	North Carolina Motor Speedway, Rockingham	November 15	Cale Yarborough
48	Tidewater 300	Langley Speedway, Hampton	November 22	Bobby Allison

== Races ==
=== Daytona 500 ===
The 1970 Daytona 500 was a stock car automobile race run on February 22, 1970, and was the second race for the winged Plymouth Superbird. Pete Hamilton won the race in a Plymouth Superbird.

1. 40- Pete Hamilton
2. 17- David Pearson
3. 22- Bobby Allison -1
4. 99- Charlie Glotzbach -1
5. 71- Bobby Isaac -2
6. 14- Richard Brickhouse -2
7. 59- Jim Hurtubise -3
8. 7- Ramo Stott -6
9. 98- LeeRoy Yarbrough -7
10. 30- Dave Marcis -7

=== Alabama 500 ===
The 1970 Alabama 500 was held on April 12, 1970, at Alabama International Motor Speedway. Pete Hamilton won his second race of the season.

1. 40- Pete Hamilton
2. 71- Bobby Isaac
3. 17- David Pearson
4. 72- Benny Parsons
5. 21- Cale Yarborough
6. 14- Freddy Fryar
7. 43- Richard Petty
8. 48- James Hylton
9. 06- Neil Castles
10. 07- Coo Coo Marlin

=== Rebel 400 ===
The 1970 Rebel 400 was a NASCAR Grand National Series race that took place in May 1970 at Darlington Raceway in South Carolina. David Pearson won the race in a Ford with a time 3:05:07. Richard Petty had a huge crash on the homestretch, which inspired the window net that is now mandated by NASCAR.

1. 17- David Pearson
2. 32- Dick Brooks -3
3. 71- Bobby Isaac -7
4. 48- James Hylton -9
5. 72- Benny Parsons -11
6. 5- Buddy Arrington -19
7. 37- Don Tarr -21
8. 46- Roy Mayne -24
9. 25- Jabe Thomas -26
10. 54- Bill Dennis -30

=== Georgia 500 ===
The 1970 Georgia 500 is a NASCAR Grand National race that took place on November 8, 1970, at Middle Georgia Raceway in Macon, Georgia. Richard Petty (racing for Petty Enterprises) defeated Bobby Isaac by fourteen seconds.

1. 43- Richard Petty
2. 71- Bobby Isaac
3. 32- Dick Brooks -2
4. 22- Bobby Allison -3
5. 4- John Sears -13
6. 48- James Hylton -15
7. 72- Benny Parsons -15
8. 64- Elmo Langley -17
9. 25- Jabe Thomas -18
10. 24- Cecil Gordon -25

=== American 500 ===
The 1970 American 500 was a 500-mile race that took place on November 15, 1970, at the North Carolina Motor Speedway in Rockingham, North Carolina. Cale Yarborough was the winner of the race.

1. 21- Cale Yarborough
2. 17- David Pearson
3. 22- Bobby Allison -3
4. 27- Donnie Allison -6
5. 6- Buddy Baker -7
6. 43- Richard Petty -11
7. 71- Bobby Isaac -14
8. 48- James Hylton -23
9. 39- Friday Hassler -28
10. 13- Buddy Young -28

=== Tidewater 300 ===
The 1970 Tidewater 300 was the final NASCAR race held during its Grand National era. Held at the Langley Field Speedway in Hampton, Virginia (.395 mile paved oval track), the race was decided in a time of one hour and forty minutes with Bobby Allison as the race winner. There were 2 cautions (for 10 laps) and 3,200 people attended this race.

1. 22- Bobby Allison
2. 72- Benny Parsons
3. 32- Pete Hamilton -1
4. 4- John Sears -2
5. 48- James Hylton -3
6. 06- Neil Castles -5
7. 64- Elmo Langley -7
8. 70- J. D. McDuffie -7
9. 79- Frank Warren -10
10. 25- Jabe Thomas -10

== Final points standings ==
=== Driver's standings ===
Finish	Driver	Points	Starts	Wins	Top 5s	Top 10s	Poles
1	Bobby Isaac	3911	47	11	32	38	13
2	Bobby Allison	3860	46	3	30	35	5
3	James Hylton	3788	47	1	22	39	1
4	Richard Petty	3447	40	18	27	31	9
5	Neil Castles	3158	47	0	12	24	0
6	Elmo Langley	3154	47	0	1	19	0
7	Jabe Thomas	3120	46	0	0	23	0
8	Benny Parsons	2993	45	0	12	23	1
9	Dave Marcis	2820	47	0	7	15	0
10	Frank Warren	2697	46	0	0	2	0
11	Cecil Gordon	2514	44	0	2	11	0
12	John Sears	2465	40	0	4	7	1
13	Dick Brooks	2460	34	0	15	18	0
14	Wendell Scott	2425	41	0	0	9	0
15	Bill Champion	2350	38	0	0	6	0
16	J.D. McDuffie	2079	36	0	1	10	0
17	Ben Arnold	1997	29	0	0	3	0
18	Bill Seifert	1962	39	0	1	4	0
19	Henley Gray	1871	34	0	0	2	0
20	Friday Hassler	1831	26	0	1	6	0
21	Pete Hamilton	1819	16	3	10	12	1
22	Joe Frasson	1723	21	0	0	2	0
23	David Pearson	1716	19	1	9	11	2
24	Buddy Baker	1555	18	1	6	8	0
25	Bill Dennis	1432	25	0	0	5	0
26	Ed Negre	1413	31	0	0	1	0
27	G.C. Spencer	1410	20	0	3	9	0
28	Charlie Glotzbach	1358	19	2	7	8	4
29	Roy Mayne	1333	16	0	0	3	0
30	Bill Shirey	1244	29	0	0	1	0
31	Raymond Williams	1204	21	0	0	0	0
32	Larry Baumel	1138	23	0	0	1	1
33	Buddy Arrington	1087	19	0	0	2	0
34	Cale Yarborough	1016	19	3	11	13	4
35	Don Tarr	995	17	0	0	5	0
36	Johnny Halford	975	25	0	0	0	0
37	Earl Brooks	884	21	0	0	1	0
38	Coo Coo Marlin	876	13	0	0	4	0
39	Ron Keselowski	855	17	0	0	1	0
40	Donnie Allison	841	19	3	10	12	0
41	Ken Meisenhelder	812	19	0	0	2	0
42	Roy Tyner	631	14	0	0	3	0
43	LeeRoy Yarbrough	625	19	1	8	11	1
44	Dick May	551	16	0	0	0	0
45	Jim Vandiver	519	14	0	0	5	0
46	John Kenney	457	11	0	0	0	0
47	Dub Simpson	367	6	0	0	1	0
48	Lee Roy Carrigg	355	9	0	0	0	0
49	Joe Phipps	325	7	0	0	0	0
50	Wayne Smith	300	8	0	0	0	0
51	Dick Bown	288	6	0	0	1	0
52	Tommy Gale	271	5	0	0	1	0
53	Ray Elder	246	4	0	0	1	0
54	Fred Lorenzen	231	7	0	1	1	1
55	Hoss Ellington	225	3	0	0	0	0
56	Butch Hirst	219	5	0	0	0	0
57	Lee Gordon	208	7	0	0	0	0
58	Richard Brickhouse	181	5	0	1	2	0
59	Buddy Young	174	2	0	0	1	0
60	Ramo Stott	172	3	0	0	3	0
61	Bugs Stevens	168	3	0	0	1	0
62	E.J. Trivette	160	4	0	0	0	0
63	Jim Hurtubise	154	2	0	0	1	0
64	James Cox	154	7	0	0	0	0
65	Bobby Mausgrover	153	3	0	0	0	0
66	Bill Hollar	145	3	0	0	1	0
67	Dave Alonzo	141	2	0	0	0	0
68	Freddy Fryar	135	1	0	0	1	0
69	Jimmy Crawford	127	3	0	0	0	0
70	Jerry Oliver	126	2	0	0	1	0
71	John Jennings	126	6	0	0	0	0
72	Kevin Terris	117	2	0	0	0	0
73	Cliff Tyler	114	4	0	0	0	0
74	Sam Rose	108	1	0	0	0	0
75	Dick Kranzler	99	1	0	0	0	0
76	Charlie Roberts	98	3	0	0	0	0
77	Paul Dorrity	96	2	0	0	0	0
78	Sonny Hutchins	92	2	0	1	1	0
79	Frank James	90	2	0	0	0	0
80	Bob Senneker	90	1	0	0	0	0
81	Pete Hazelwood	86	3	0	0	0	0
82	Ed Hessert	85	2	0	0	0	0
83	Ranny Dodd	84	2	0	0	0	0
84	Paul Connors	81	1	0	0	0	0
85	Jimmy Insolo	78	2	0	0	0	0
86	Jim Cook	75	1	0	0	0	0
87	Ron Grana	72	3	0	0	1	0
88	Steve Froines	72	2	0	0	0	0
89	Gary DuPuis	72	1	0	0	0	0
90	Morgan Shepherd	69	3	0	0	0	0
91	Bub Strickler	64	1	0	0	0	0
92	Jack McCoy	63	2	0	0	1	0
93	G.T. Tallas	60	2	0	0	0	0
94	Les Loeser	57	1	0	0	0	0
94	Marty Robbins	57	1	0	0	0	0
96	Frog Fagan	54	2	0	0	0	0
97	Harry Shipe	54	2	0	0	0	0
98	Harold Smith	54	1	0	0	0	0
99	Rod Eulenfeld	50	1	0	0	0	0
100	Larry Manning	48	1	0	0	0	0
101	Bobby Watson	46	1	0	0	0	0
102	James Sears	44	2	0	0	2	0
103	Pop McGinnis	42	1	0	0	1	0
104	Ken Spikes	42	1	0	0	0	0
104	Carl Joiner	42	1	0	0	0	0
106	Don Noel	39	2	0	0	0	0
107	Joe Hines	34	1	0	0	0	0
108	Bob Ashbrook	31	1	0	0	0	0
109	Bill Kimmel	31	1	0	0	0	0
110	Frank Deiny	30	1	0	0	0	0
111	Scotty Cain	27	2	0	0	0	0
112	Bob England	24	2	0	0	0	0
113	Arnold Bennett	21	1	0	0	0	0
	Tiny Lund		5	0	2	2	0
	Clyde Lynn		1	0	0	1	0
	Roger McCluskey		1	0	1	1	0
	Lothar Motschenbacher		1	0	0	0	0
	Jim Paschal		1	0	0	0	0
	Lennie Pond		1	0	0	0	0
	Sam Posey		1	0	0	0	0
	Bill Pratt		1	0	0	0	0
	Talmadge Prince		1	0	0	0	0
	Bill Scott		1	0	0	0	0
	Don Simkins		1	0	0	0	0
	John Soares, Jr.		1	0	1	1	0
	Dick Trickle		2	0	0	0	0
	Tom Usry		1	0	0	0	0
	Jimmy Watson		1	0	0	0	0
	Don White		1	0	0	0	0
	Eddie Yarboro		1	0	0	1	0
	Mel Larson		1	0	0	1	0
	Parnelli Jones		1	0	0	0	0
	Alton Jones		1	0	0	0	0
	Buck Baker		1	0	0	0	0
	Bunkie Blackburn		1	0	0	0	0
	Len Blanchard		2	0	0	0	0
	Bobby Boyles		1	0	0	0	0
	Rodney Bruce		1	0	0	0	0
	Joe Clark		1	0	0	1	0
	Pat Fay		1	0	0	0	0
	Paul Feldner		2	0	0	1	0
	A.J. Foyt		3	1	1	1	0
	Glenn Francis		1	0	0	0	0
	Jerry Griffin		1	0	0	0	0
	Dick Guldstrand		2	0	1	2	0
	Dan Gurney		1	0	0	1	1
	Robert Hale		1	0	0	0	0
	Ed Howland		1	0	0	0	0
	Ray Johnstone		1	0	0	0	0
	H.B. Bailey		1	0	0	0	0

== See also ==
- 1970 NASCAR Grand National West
