= 1968 NASCAR Grand National Series =

Seasons
- ← 1967 1969 →

The 1968 NASCAR Grand National Series was the 20th season of professional stock car racing in the United States. The season, which began on November 12, 1967 at Middle Georgia Raceway near Byron, Georgia, was contested over 49 races. The season ended at Jefco Speedway near Jefferson, Georgia, on November 3, 1968. David Pearson was the drivers' champion. Pete Hamilton was the Rookie of the Year.

== Results ==
| No | Date | Race | Track | Track type | | Pole Position | Winning Driver | Purse (US$) | Avg. Speed (mph) | Report |
| No | Date | Race | Track | Surface | Length (miles) | Pole Position | Winning Driver | Purse (US$) | Avg. Speed (mph) | Report |
|---|---|---|---|---|---|---|---|---|---|---|
| 1 | 11/12/1967 | Middle Georgia 500 | Middle Georgia Raceway (Byron, GA) | Paved | 0.534 | LeeRoy Yarbrough | Bobby Allison | 16,180 | 81.001 | |
| 2 | 11/26/1967 | | Montgomery Motor Speedway (Montgomery, AL) | Paved | 0.500 | Richard Petty | Richard Petty | 4,940 | 70.644 | |
| 3 | 1/21/1968 | Motor-Trend 500 | Riverside International Raceway (Riverside, CA) | Road Course | 2.700 | Dan Gurney | Dan Gurney | 69,365 | 100.598 | |
| 4 | 2/25/1968 | Daytona 500 | Daytona International Speedway (Daytona Beach, FL) | Paved | 2.500 | Cale Yarborough | Cale Yarborough | 158,860 | 143.251 | Report |
| 5 | 3/17/1968 | Southeastern 500 | Bristol International Speedway (Bristol, TN) | Paved | 0.500 | Richard Petty | David Pearson | 25,820 | 77.247 | Report |
| 6 | 3/24/1968 | Richmond 250 | Richmond Raceway (Richmond, VA) | Dirt | 0.500 | Bobby Isaac | David Pearson | 8,750 | 65.217 | |
| 7 | 3/31/1968 | Atlanta 500 | Atlanta Motor Speedway (Hampton, GA) | Paved | 1.500 | LeeRoy Yarbrough | Cale Yarborough | 67,405 | 125.564 | |
| 8 | 4/7/1968 | Hickory 250 | Hickory Speedway (Hickory, NC) | Paved | 0.400 | David Pearson | Richard Petty | 4,940 | 79.435 | Report |
| 9 | 4/13/1968 | Greenville 200 | Greenville-Pickens Speedway (Easley, SC) | Dirt | 0.500 | David Pearson | Richard Petty | 4,940 | 63.347 | |
| 10 | 4/18/1968 | Columbia 200 | Columbia Speedway (Cayce, SC) | Dirt | 0.500 | Richard Petty | Bobby Isaac | 4,940 | 71.358 | Report |
| 11 | 4/21/1968 | Gwyn Staley Memorial | North Wilkesboro Speedway (North Wilkesboro, NC) | Paved | 0.625 | David Pearson | David Pearson | 18,275 | 90.425 | |
| 12 | 4/28/1968 | Virginia 500 | Martinsville Speedway (Manassas, VA) | Paved | 0.500 | David Pearson | Cale Yarborough | 24,082 | 66.686 | |
| 13 | 5/3/1968 | Dixie 250 | Augusta International Raceway (Hephzibah, GA) | Paved | 0.500 | Bobby Isaac | Bobby Isaac | 6,260 | 73.099 | Report |
| 14 | 5/5/1968 | Fireball 300 | Asheville Weaverville Speedway (Weaverville, NC) | Paved | 0.500 | David Pearson | David Pearson | 6,900 | 75.167 | Report |
| 15 | 5/11/1968 | Rebel 400 | Darlington Raceway (Darlington, SC) | Paved | 1.375 | LeeRoy Yarbrough | David Pearson | 53,455 | 132.699 | Report |
| 16 | 5/17/1968 | Beltsville 300 | Beltsville Speedway (Beltsville, MD) | Paved | 0.500 | Richard Petty | David Pearson | 6,800 | 74.844 | Report |
| 17 | 5/18/1968 | Tidewater 250 | Langley Field Speedway (Hampton, VA) | Paved | 0.400 | Richard Petty | David Pearson | 4,740 | 71.457 | Report |
| 18 | 5/26/1968 | Charlotte World 600 | Charlotte Motor Speedway (Concord, NC) | Paved | 1.500 | Donnie Allison | Buddy Baker | 125,510 | 104.207 | Report |
| 19 | 5/31/1968 | Asheville 300 | New Asheville Speedway (Asheville, NC) | Paved | 0.333 | Richard Petty | Richard Petty | 4,955 | 65.741 | |
| 20 | 6/2/1968 | Macon 300 | Middle Georgia Raceway (Byron, GA) | Paved | 0.500 | David Pearson | David Pearson | 6,885 | 79.342 | |
| 21 | 6/6/1968 | | Smoky Mountain Raceway (Maryville, TN) | Paved | 0.500 | David Pearson | Richard Petty | 4,855 | 76.743 | |
| 22 | 6/8/1968 | | Fairgrounds Raceway (Birmingham, AL) | Paved | 0.625 | David Pearson | Richard Petty | 4,555 | 89.153 | |
| 23 | 6/16/1968 | Carolina 500 | North Carolina Motor Speedway (Rockingham, NC) | Paved | 1.000 | LeeRoy Yarbrough | Donnie Allison | 65,665 | 99.338 | |
| 24 | 6/22/1968 | | Greenville-Pickens Speedway (Easley, SC) | Dirt | 0.500 | David Pearson | Richard Petty | 4,940 | 64.609 | |
| 25 | 7/4/1968 | Firecracker 400 | Daytona International Speedway (Daytona Beach, FL) | Paved | 2.500 | Charlie Glotzbach | Cale Yarborough | 57,150 | 167.247 | |
| 26 | 7/7/1968 | Islip 300 | Islip Speedway (Islip, NY) | Paved | 0.200 | Buddy Baker | Bobby Allison | 5,255 | 48.561 | Report |
| 27 | 7/9/1968 | Maine 300 | Oxford Plains Speedway (Oxford, ME) | Paved | 0.333 | Buddy Baker | Richard Petty | 6,335 | 63.717 | |
| 28 | 7/11/1968 | Fonda 200 | Fonda Speedway (Fonda, NY) | Dirt | 0.500 | David Pearson | Richard Petty | 5,255 | 64.935 | |
| 29 | 7/14/1968 | Northern 300 | Trenton Speedway (Trenton, NJ) | Paved | 1.000 | LeeRoy Yarbrough | LeeRoy Yarbrough | 17,725 | 89.079 | Report |
| 30 | 7/21/1968 | Volunteer 500 | Bristol International Speedway (Bristol, TN) | Paved | 0.500 | LeeRoy Yarbrough | David Pearson | 24,140 | 76.31 | Report |
| 31 | 7/25/1968 | Smoky 200 | Smoky Mountain Raceway (Maryville, TN) | Paved | 0.500 | Bobby Isaac | Richard Petty | 5,355 | 71.513 | |
| 32 | 7/27/1968 | Nashville 400 | Nashville Superspeedway (Nashville, TN) | Paved | 0.500 | Richard Petty | David Pearson | 10,300 | 72.98 | |
| 33 | 8/4/1968 | Dixie 500 | Atlanta Motor Speedway (Hampton, GA) | Paved | 1.500 | Buddy Baker | LeeRoy Yarbrough | 66,075 | 127.068 | |
| 34 | 8/8/1968 | Sandlapper 200 | Columbia Speedway (Cayce, SC) | Dirt | 0.500 | Buddy Baker | David Pearson | 4,940 | 67.039 | |
| 35 | 8/10/1968 | Myers Brothers Memorial | Bowman Gray Stadium (Winston-Salem, NC) | Paved | 0.250 | Richard Petty | David Pearson | 4,790 | 42.94 | |
| 36 | 8/18/1968 | Western North Carolina 500 | Asheville Weaverville Speedway (Weaverville, NC) | Paved | 0.500 | Darel Dieringer | David Pearson | 13,845 | 73.686 | Report |
| 37 | 8/23/1968 | South Boston 400 | South Boston Speedway (South Boston, VA) | Paved | 0.375 | Richard Petty | Richard Petty | 4,820 | 75.916 | |
| 38 | 8/24/1968 | Crabber 250 | Langley Field Speedway (Hampton, VA) | Paved | 0.400 | David Pearson | David Pearson | 5,120 | 75.582 | |
| 39 | 9/2/1968 | Southern 500 | Darlington Raceway (Darlington, SC) | Paved | 1.375 | Charlie Glotzbach | Cale Yarborough | 86,825 | 126.132 | |
| 40 | 9/6/1968 | Buddy Shuman Memorial | Hickory Speedway (Hickory, NC) | Paved | 0.400 | Richard Petty | David Pearson | 5,540 | 80.357 | |
| 41 | 9/8/1968 | Capital City 300 | Richmond Raceway (Richmond, VA) | Paved | 0.625 | Richard Petty | Richard Petty | 11,510 | 85.659 | |
| 42 | 9/13/1968 | Maryland 300 | Beltsville Speedway (Beltsville, MD) | Paved | 0.500 | Cale Yarborough | Bobby Isaac | 7,200 | 71.033 | |
| 43 | 9/15/1968 | Hillsborough 150 | Orange Speedway (Hillsborough, NC) | Dirt | 0.900 | Richard Petty | Richard Petty | 6,900 | 87.681 | |
| 44 | 9/22/1968 | Old Dominion 500 | Martinsville Speedway (Manassas, VA) | Paved | 0.500 | Cale Yarborough | Richard Petty | 24,176 | 65.808 | |
| 45 | 9/29/1968 | Wilkes 400 | North Wilkesboro Speedway (North Wilkesboro, NC) | Paved | 0.625 | Bobby Allison | Richard Petty | 19,550 | 94.103 | |
| 46 | 10/5/1968 | Augusta 200 | Augusta International Raceway (Hephzibah, GA) | Paved | 0.500 | Bobby Allison | David Pearson | 4,840 | 75.821 | |
| 47 | 10/20/1968 | National 500 | Charlotte Motor Speedway (Concord, NC) | Paved | 1.500 | Charlie Glotzbach | Charlie Glotzbach | 90,880 | 135.234 | Report |
| 48 | 10/27/1968 | American 500 | North Carolina Motor Speedway (Rockingham, NC) | Paved | 1.000 | Cale Yarborough | Richard Petty | 69,800 | 105.06 | Report |
| 49 | 11/3/1968 | Peach State 200 | Jefco Speedway (Jefferson, GA) | Paved | 0.500 | David Pearson | Cale Yarborough | 4,940 | 77.737 | Report |

== Driver Standings ==
The top 50 drivers in the end of season standings:

| No | Driver | Points | Starts | Poles | Wins | Top 5s | Top 10s | Laps | Laps Led | $ Earnings |
|---|---|---|---|---|---|---|---|---|---|---|
| 1 | David Pearson | 3,499 | 48 | 12 | 16 | 36 | 38 | 13,097 | 3,950 | 133,065 |
| 2 | Bobby Isaac | 3,373 | 49 | 3 | 3 | 27 | 36 | 12,947 | 1,384 | 60,342 |
| 3 | Richard Petty | 3,123 | 49 | 12 | 16 | 31 | 35 | 12,254 | 4,242 | 99,535 |
| 4 | Clyde Lynn | 3,041 | 49 | 0 | 0 | 2 | 25 | 12,013 | 0 | 29,226 |
| 5 | John Sears | 3,017 | 49 | 0 | 0 | 5 | 24 | 11,077 | 0 | 29,179 |
| 6 | Elmo Langley | 2,823 | 48 | 0 | 0 | 6 | 28 | 11,149 | 0 | 25,832 |
| 7 | James Hylton | 2,719 | 41 | 0 | 0 | 16 | 28 | 10,058 | 15 | 32,608 |
| 8 | Jabe Thomas | 2,687 | 48 | 0 | 0 | 1 | 15 | 11,194 | 0 | 21,166 |
| 9 | Wendell Scott | 2,685 | 48 | 0 | 0 | 0 | 10 | 10,231 | 0 | 20,497 |
| 10 | Roy Tyner | 2,504 | 48 | 0 | 0 | 4 | 14 | 8,789 | 0 | 20,247 |
| 11 | Bobby Allison | 2,454 | 37 | 2 | 2 | 18 | 20 | 8,781 | 695 | 52,288 |
| 12 | Neil Castles | 2,330 | 44 | 0 | 0 | 4 | 15 | 9,072 | 0 | 19,506 |
| 13 | Buddy Baker | 2,310 | 38 | 4 | 1 | 16 | 18 | 7,949 | 564 | 56,023 |
| 14 | Bill Seifert | 2,175 | 44 | 0 | 0 | 1 | 9 | 8,063 | 0 | 18,403 |
| 15 | Earl Brooks | 1,957 | 40 | 0 | 0 | 0 | 5 | 6,507 | 0 | 14,233 |
| 16 | LeeRoy Yarbrough | 1,894 | 26 | 6 | 2 | 15 | 16 | 6,423 | 1,318 | 87,919 |
| 17 | Cale Yarborough | 1,804 | 21 | 4 | 6 | 12 | 12 | 5,661 | 1,047 | 138,051 |
| 18 | Paul Dean Holt | 1,723 | 40 | 0 | 0 | 0 | 0 | 5,863 | 0 | 8,985 |
| 19 | Charlie Glotzbach | 1,693 | 22 | 3 | 1 | 10 | 12 | 4,871 | 291 | 43,100 |
| 20 | Henley Gray | 1,559 | 30 | 0 | 0 | 0 | 6 | 6,072 | 0 | 12,565 |
| 21 | Darel Dieringer | 1,525 | 18 | 1 | 0 | 5 | 8 | 4,409 | 159 | 28,215 |
| 22 | Tiny Lund | 1,443 | 17 | 0 | 0 | 5 | 10 | 4,547 | 1 | 17,785 |
| 23 | G. C. Spencer | 1,401 | 26 | 0 | 0 | 1 | 6 | 4,380 | 0 | 10,120 |
| 24 | J. D. McDuffie | 1,370 | 32 | 0 | 0 | 0 | 9 | 5,587 | 0 | 8,355 |
| 25 | Donnie Allison | 1,307 | 13 | 1 | 1 | 5 | 8 | 3,829 | 284 | 50,815 |
| 26 | Stan Meserve | 1,274 | 31 | 0 | 0 | 0 | 1 | 4,283 | 0 | 7,475 |
| 27 | Friday Hassler | 1,224 | 20 | 0 | 0 | 3 | 8 | 5,012 | 0 | 12,000 |
| 28 | Bill Champion | 1,155 | 18 | 0 | 0 | 0 | 2 | 3,505 | 0 | 10,170 |
| 29 | Bud Moore | 1,086 | 16 | 0 | 0 | 2 | 9 | 3,399 | 51 | 12,325 |
| 30 | Paul Goldsmith | 1,020 | 15 | 0 | 0 | 2 | 4 | 2,793 | 304 | 24,365 |
| 31 | Ed Negre | 928 | 24 | 0 | 0 | 0 | 1 | 2,930 | 0 | 5,085 |
| 32 | Pete Hamilton | 919 | 16 | 0 | 0 | 3 | 6 | 3,555 | 42 | 8,239 |
| 33 | Wayne Smith | 901 | 18 | 0 | 0 | 0 | 1 | 2,456 | 0 | 7,235 |
| 34 | Dave Marcis | 851 | 10 | 0 | 0 | 0 | 2 | 3,240 | 0 | 8,199 |
| 35 | Don Tarr | 827 | 12 | 0 | 0 | 0 | 0 | 1,941 | 0 | 7,510 |
| 36 | E. J. Trivette | 821 | 13 | 0 | 0 | 0 | 0 | 2,684 | 0 | 8,295 |
| 37 | Dick Johnson | 735 | 11 | 0 | 0 | 0 | 0 | 2,187 | 0 | 5,920 |
| 38 | Bob Cooper | 668 | 14 | 0 | 0 | 0 | 1 | 2,170 | 0 | 4,540 |
| 39 | Buck Baker | 650 | 17 | 0 | 0 | 1 | 3 | 2,675 | 0 | 3,580 |
| 40 | Walson Gardner | 640 | 14 | 0 | 0 | 0 | 2 | 3,546 | 0 | 4,275 |
| 40 | Larry Manning | 640 | 12 | 0 | 0 | 0 | 0 | 2,151 | 0 | 6,995 |
| 42 | Frank Warren | 611 | 10 | 0 | 0 | 0 | 1 | 1,643 | 0 | 5,365 |
| 43 | Jerry Grant | 559 | 7 | 0 | 0 | 0 | 1 | 971 | 1 | 5,665 |
| 44 | Frog Fagan | 531 | 12 | 0 | 0 | 0 | 1 | 1,808 | 0 | 3,680 |
| 45 | Richard Brickhouse | 514 | 7 | 0 | 0 | 1 | 2 | 1,571 | 0 | 7,190 |
| 46 | Jim Hurtubise | 504 | 6 | 0 | 0 | 0 | 1 | 982 | 0 | 4,490 |
| 47 | Curtis Turner | 456 | 6 | 0 | 0 | 1 | 4 | 1,448 | 0 | 5,850 |
| 48 | Bobby Johns | 453 | 7 | 0 | 0 | 0 | 0 | 750 | 0 | 5,010 |
| 49 | Eddie Yarboro | 447 | 6 | 0 | 0 | 0 | 0 | 2,109 | 0 | 2,255 |
| 50 | Red Farmer | 407 | 7 | 0 | 0 | 1 | 1 | 928 | 1 | 4,810 |
