= Harris, North Carolina =

- Unincorporated community
- Location within North Carolina Location within the United States
- Coordinates: 35°14′34″N 81°52′28″W
- Country: United States
- State: North Carolina
- County: Rutherford
- Elevation: 791 ft (241 m)
- Time zone: UTC-5 (Eastern (EST))
  - Summer (DST): UTC-4 (EDT)
- ZIP code: 28074
- Area code: 828
- GNIS feature ID: 1024024

Harris is an unincorporated community in Rutherford County, North Carolina, United States. The community is located along a railroad south of U.S. Route 221 and 10 miles (16 km) south-southeast of Rutherfordton. Harris has a post office with ZIP code 28074.
