= State Fairgrounds Speedway =

Former NASCAR dirt racetrack in Raleigh, North Carolina, USA

Coordinates: 35.7963°N 78.7115°W

Fairgrounds Speedway
- Address: Blue Ridge Road at Trinity Road; Raleigh, North Carolina 27607
- Opened: 1928
- Closed: 1970
- Surface: Dirt
- Length: 0.5 miles
- Turns: 4

State Fairgrounds Speedway, located at the North Carolina State Fairgrounds in Raleigh, North Carolina, was a half-mile oval dirt racetrack which was the site of auto races for NASCAR's top series in 1955, 1969, and 1970. The race on September 30, 1970 was the final Grand National race ever held on a dirt track, until the 2021 season. It was won by Richard Petty in a Plymouth that had been sold by Petty Enterprises to Don Robertson and rented back for the race.

The track closed in 1970 shortly after the last NASCAR race. While the track itself has largely been removed, the grandstand, now called the Sam G. Rand Grandstand, remains and is used for events related to the North Carolina State Fair.

The North Carolina Office of Archives and History erected historical marker H-120 to commemorate the site's historical significance.
