= Marcis Auto Racing =

Former American stock car racing team

- Owner: Dave Marcis
- Series: Winston Cup Series
- Race drivers: Dave Marcis; Jim Sauter; Mike Alexander
- Manufacturer: Chevrolet, Dodge
- Opened: 1969
- Closed: 2003

Career
- Drivers' Championships: 0
- Race victories: 1

Marcis Auto Racing is a former NASCAR Winston Cup team. It was owned and operated by former NASCAR driver Dave Marcis.

== Winston Cup ==
The highlight of Marcis' career as an owner-driver was winning at the old Richmond Fairgrounds in 1982 driving a very un-raceable looking 71 Chevy Malibu, sponsored by J. D. Stacy. Marcis was a lap down, but made up the lap when the race leader Joe Ruttman spun out and Marcis passed him. All three drivers that were ahead of Marcis pitted and he assumed the lead as it began to rain. The race was called complete as darkness set in, and Marcis was declared the winner. Marcis described the win, "I wasn't praying for rain, but I told the guys when I got out of the car (during the break before the race was canceled) that if the good Lord wanted to help an independent, this was his chance." "It was one of my greatest moments in racing," Marcis said. "I had even built my own engine for that race."

== Motorsports career results ==
=== Grand National Series ===
(key) (Bold – Pole position awarded by qualifying time. Italics – Pole position earned by points standings or practice time. * – Most laps led.)

==== Car No. 2/30 results ====
NASCAR Grand National Series results
Year	Team	No.	Make	1	2	3	4	5	6	7	8	9	10	11	12	13	14	15	16	17	18	19	20	21	22	23	24	25	26	27	28	29	30	31	32	33	34	35	36	37	38	39	40	41	42	43	44	45	46	47	48	49	50	51	52	53	54	NGNC	Pts
1969	Dave Marcis	30	Dodge	MGR	MGY	RSD	DAY	DAY	DAY	CAR	AUG	BRI	ATL	CLB	HCY	GPS	RCH	NWS; 24	MAR	AWS	DAR	BLV	LGY	CLT	MGR	SMR	MCH; 19	KPT	GPS	NCF	DAY	DOV	TPN	TRN	BLV	BRI	NSV	SMR	ATL	MCH	SBO	BGS	AWS	DAR	HCY	RCH	TAL	CLB	MAR	NWS	CLT	SVH	AUG	CAR	JFC	MGR	TWS		
1970	Dave Marcis	30	Dodge	RSD; 14	DAY	DAY; 23	DAY; 10	RCH; 13	CAR; 6	SVH; 5	ATL; 31	BRI; 11	TAL; 17	NWS; 20	CLB; 17	DAR; 32	BLV; 5	LGY; 9	CLT; 17	SMR; 5	MAR; 33	MCH; 9	RSD; 34	HCY; 3	KPT; 3	GPS; 20	DAY; 22	AST; 3	TPN; 6	TRN	BRI; 23	SMR; 15	NSV; 10	ATL; 29	CLB	ONA	MCH; 39	TAL; 32	BGS	SBO	DAR; DNQ	HCY	RCH	DOV; 23	NCF	NWS	CLT; 36	MAR; 25	MGR	CAR; 32	LGY								
1971	Dave Marcis	2	Dodge	RSD	DAY; 9	DAY	DAY; 25	ONT	**RCH**; 5	CAR; 34	HCY; 10	BRI; 11	ATL; 11	CLB	GPS; 4	SMR; 21	NWS	MAR; 4	DAR; 3	SBO; 27				CLT; 9	DOV	MCH; 9	RSD	HOU	GPS	DAY; 34	BRI	AST; 2	ISP	TRN; 4	NSV	ATL; 39	BGS	ONA	MCH	TAL	CLB	**HCY**; 16*	DAR	MAR; 18	CLT	DOV	CAR; 28	MGR	RCH	NWS; 4	TWS; 40								
1971	Bill Seifert	2	Dodge																		TAL; 12	ASH	KPT																																				

=== Winston Cup Series ===
==== Car No. 2/02/71 results ====
NASCAR Winston Cup Series results
Year	Driver	No.	Make	1	2	3	4	5	6	7	8	9	10	11	12	13	14	15	16	17	18	19	20	21	22	23	24	25	26	27	28	29	30	31	32	33	34	35	36	Owners	Pts
1972	Dave Marcis	2	Dodge	RSD	DAY; 27	RCH; 4	ONT	CAR; 5	ATL; 23	BRI; 26	DAR; 25	NWS; 7	MAR; 3	TAL; 11		DOV; 36			TWS; 13	DAY; 13	BRI; 3	TRN; 25	ATL; 7	TAL; 46	MCH	NSV	DAR	RCH; 5	DOV					TWS; 12							
1972	Ken Rush	2	Dodge												CLT; 29																										
1972	Bill Seifert	2	Dodge														MCH; 39	RSD																							
1972	Ray Hendrick	2	Dodge																											MAR; 25	NWS										
1972	Roger McCluskey	2	Dodge																													CLT; 27	CAR								
1973	Dave Marcis	2	Dodge	RSD; 40	DAY	RCH; 5	CAR	BRI; 4	ATL; 12	NWS; 20	DAR; 40	MAR	TAL; 17	NSV; 11	CLT	DOV	TWS	RSD	MCH; 36	DAY; 6	BRI	ATL; 32	TAL; 12	NSV	DAR	RCH	DOV	NWS; 7	MAR; 33												
1973	Dave Marcis	2	AMC																											CLT; 24	CAR										
1974	Dave Marcis	2	Dodge	RSD; 28	DAY; 14	RCH; 5	CAR; 8	BRI; 22	ATL; 20	DAR	NWS; 10	MAR; 8	TAL; 6	NSV; 5	DOV; 7	CLT; 6	RSD; 27	MCH; 8	DAY; 19	BRI; 9	NSV; 21	ATL; 6	POC; 6	TAL; 11	MCH; 7	DAR; 4	RCH; 13	DOV; 5	NWS; 5	MAR; 4											
1974	Dick Trickle	2	Dodge																												CLT; 8										
1974	Dick Trickle	2	Mercury																													CAR; 7	ONT								
1975	Ed Negre	2	Dodge	RSD	DAY	RCH	CAR	BRI	ATL	NWS	DAR	MAR	TAL	NSV	DOV; 31	CLT; 32	RSD	MCH	DAY; 12	NSV																					
1975	Dick May	2	Dodge																		POC; 17	TAL	MCH	DAR	DOV	NWS	MAR	CLT	RCH	CAR	BRI	ATL									
1975	John Martin	2	Dodge																														ONT; 30								
1977	Dave Marcis	2	Chevy	RSD	DAY	RCH	CAR	ATL	NWS	DAR	BRI; 21	MAR; 20	TAL	NSV	DOV	CLT	RSD	MCH	DAY	NSV	POC	TAL	MCH	BRI	DAR	RCH	DOV	MAR	NWS	CLT	CAR	ATL	ONT								
1979	Dave Marcis	02	Chevy	RSD; 24	DAY; 24	CAR; 16	RCH; 16	ATL; 6	NWS; 12	BRI; 17	DAR; 27	MAR; 26																													
1979	Dave Marcis	71	Chevy										TAL; 14	NSV	DOV	CLT; 26	TWS	RSD	MCH; 26	DAY; 17	NSV	POC	TAL; 31	MCH; 30	BRI; 18	DAR; 6	RCH; 7	DOV; 7	MAR; 5	CLT; 37	NWS; 21	CAR; 9	ATL; 23	ONT; 17							
1980	Dave Marcis	71	Chevy	RSD; 17		RCH; 4	CAR; 9		BRI; 9	DAR; 23	NWS; 21	MAR; 8		NSV; 11	DOV; 25			RSD; 6	MCH; 35		NSV; 14	POC; 8		MCH; 26	BRI; 7	DAR; 8	RCH; 7	DOV; 12	NWS; 3	MAR; 5		CAR; 6	ATL; 22	ONT; 15							
1980	Dave Marcis	71	Olds		DAY; 22			ATL; 4					TAL; 29			CLT; 29	TWS; 7			DAY; 33			TAL; 39								CLT; 19										
1981	Dave Marcis	71	Chevy	RSD; 28					BRI; 31	**NWS**; 4	DAR; 3	MAR; 11		NSV; 10	DOV; 31			RSD; 9									RCH; 19	DOV; 8	MAR; 14	NWS; 16		CAR; 12									
1981	Dave Marcis	71	Olds		DAY; 15			ATL; 27																																	
1981	Dave Marcis	71	Dodge			RCH; 22	CAR; 15									CLT; 35																									
1981	Dave Marcis	71	Buick										TAL; 14				TWS; 5		MCH; 29	DAY; 13	NSV	POC; 33	TAL; 10	MCH; 11	BRI; 9	DAR; 3					CLT; 40		ATL; 28								
1981	Dave Marcis	71	Pontiac																															RSD; 25							
1982	Dave Marcis	71	Buick	DAY; 24			ATL; 12		DAR; 27			TAL; 30			CLT; 9			MCH; 14	DAY; 10		POC; 8	TAL; 13	MCH; 8	BRI; 21					CLT; 32			ATL; 6									
1982	Dave Marcis	71	Chevy		RCH; 1	BRI; 10		CAR; 21		NWS; 29	MAR; 6		NSV; 8	DOV; 2		POC; 10				NSV; 11					DAR; 10	RCH; 8	DOV; 6	NWS; 11		MAR; 28	CAR; 11										
1982	Dave Marcis	71	Pontiac														RSD; 30																RSD; 29								
1983	Dave Marcis	71	Chevy	DAY; 32	RCH; 9	CAR; 34	ATL; 13	DAR; 33	NWS; 9	MAR; 19	TAL; 9	NSV; 27	DOV; 16	BRI; 12	CLT; 10		POC; 11	MCH; 30	DAY; 13	NSV; 9	POC; 8	TAL; 32	MCH; 11	BRI; 20	DAR; 14	RCH; 18	DOV; 22	MAR; 28	NWS; 25		CAR; 7										
1983	Dave Marcis	71	Pontiac													RSD; 12																									
1983	Dave Marcis	71	Olds																											CLT; 17		ATL; 13	RSD; 12								
1984	Mike Alexander	71	Olds	DAY; 21	RCH; 21	CAR; 11	ATL; 31	BRI; 29	NWS; 21	DAR; 32	MAR; 31	TAL; 17	NSV; 13	DOV	CLT; 16	RSD; 31	POC	MCH; 23	DAY; 22	NSV; 12	POC	TAL; 17	MCH; 24	BRI; 7	DAR; 34																
1984	Lennie Pond	71	Olds																							RCH; 17	DOV; 12	MAR; 9	CLT; 25	NWS; 12	CAR; 10	ATL; 37	RSD								
1985	Dave Marcis	71	Chevy	DAY; 24			ATL; 37					TAL; 8					MCH; 9	DAY; 23	POC; 38	TAL; 26	MCH; 12		DAR; 23	RCH; 17	DOV; 19	MAR; 23	NWS; 9	CLT; 34	CAR; 14	ATL; 28	RSD; 18										
1985	Dave Marcis	71	Olds		RCH; 8	CAR; 26		BRI; 24	DAR; 31	NWS; 16	MAR; 26		DOV; 9	CLT; 11	RSD; 12	POC; 27						BRI; 23																			
1986	Dave Marcis	71	Pontiac	DAY; 38			ATL; 33					TAL; 11			RSD; 38	POC; 14	MCH; 37	DAY; 20	POC; 24	TAL; 36																					
1986	Dave Marcis	71	Chevy		RCH; 9	CAR; 27		BRI; 27	DAR; 27	NWS; 25	MAR; 16		DOV; 21								GLN; 13	MCH; 35	BRI; 15	DAR; 11	RCH; 23	DOV; 5	MAR; 9	NWS; 8	CLT; 11	CAR; 34	ATL; 33	RSD; 12									
1986	Dave Marcis	71	Ford											CLT; 16																											
1987	Dave Marcis	71	Chevy	DAY; 34	CAR; 35	RCH; 8	ATL; 31	DAR; 33	NWS; 26	BRI; 27	MAR; 23	TAL; 13	CLT; 14	DOV; 8	POC; 27	RSD; 16	MCH; 15	DAY; 3	POC; 9	TAL; 22	GLN; 3	MCH; 35	BRI; 18	DAR; 16	RCH; 7	DOV; 15	MAR; 27	NWS; 30	CLT; 18	CAR; 22	RSD; 9	ATL; 32									
1988	Dave Marcis	71	Chevy	DAY; 20	RCH; 17	CAR; 23	ATL; 15	DAR; 37	BRI; 9	NWS; 25	MAR; 12	TAL; 27	CLT; 34	DOV; 32	RSD; 21	POC; 38	MCH; 18	DAY; 23	POC; 30	TAL; 18	GLN; 26	MCH; 22	BRI; 29	DAR; 22	RCH; 10	DOV; 16	MAR; 13	CLT; 26	NWS; 21	CAR; 16	PHO; 18	ATL; 19									
1989	Dave Marcis	71	Chevy	DAY; 20	CAR; 35	ATL; 42	RCH; 20	DAR; 17	BRI; DNQ	NWS; 20	MAR; 9	TAL; 20	CLT; 16	DOV; 16	SON; 16	POC; 18	MCH; 21	DAY; 25	POC; 19	TAL; 19	GLN; 25	MCH; 24	BRI; 12	DAR; 28	RCH; 16	DOV; 22	MAR; DNQ	CLT; 19	NWS; 14	CAR; 30	PHO; 15	ATL; 33									
1990	Dave Marcis	71	Chevy	DAY; 23	RCH; 17	CAR; 22	ATL; 22	DAR; 15	BRI; 15	NWS; 12	MAR; 14	TAL; 14	CLT; 16	DOV; 35	SON; 32	POC; 22	MCH; 19		POC; 28	TAL; 28	GLN; 31	MCH; 18	BRI; 19	DAR; 16	RCH; 15	DOV; 22	MAR; 14	NWS; 25	CLT; 13	CAR; 23	PHO; 17	ATL; 34									
1990	Dave Marcis	71	Pontiac															DAY; 20																							
1991	Dave Marcis	71	Chevy	DAY; 35	RCH; 33	CAR; 23	ATL; 36	DAR; 18	BRI; DNQ	NWS; 19	MAR; DNQ	TAL; 18	CLT; 32	DOV; 23	SON; 24	POC; 24	MCH; 16	DAY; 25	POC; 18	TAL; 21	GLN; 37	MCH; 20	BRI; 23	DAR; 33	RCH; 29	DOV; 10	MAR; 21	NWS; 31	CLT; 34	CAR; 26	PHO; 40	ATL; 12									
1992	Dave Marcis	71	Chevy	DAY; 20	CAR; 39	RCH; 28	ATL; 30	DAR; 25	BRI; 31	NWS; 24	MAR; 24	TAL; 27	CLT; 15	DOV; 25	SON; 23	POC; 18	MCH; 36	DAY; 32	POC; 31	TAL; 29	GLN; 17	MCH; 32								CAR; 38	PHO; 35	ATL; 22									
1992	Jim Sauter	71	Chevy																				BRI; 18	DAR; 36	RCH; 26	DOV; 18	MAR; 22	NWS; 29	CLT; 21												
1993	Dave Marcis	71	Chevy	DAY; 33	CAR; 21	RCH; 36	ATL; 34	DAR; 25	BRI; DNQ	NWS; DNQ	MAR; 15	TAL; DNQ	SON; 28	CLT; 39	DOV; 36	POC; 23	MCH; 24	DAY; 27	NHA; 30	POC; 22	TAL; 29	GLN; DNQ	MCH; 22	BRI; 17	DAR; 29	RCH; 23	DOV; 19	MAR; 21	NWS; DNQ	CLT; DNQ			ATL; 18								
1993	Dave Marcis	71	Ford																												CAR; 27										
1993	Terry Fisher	71	Pontiac																													PHO; 37									
1994	Dave Marcis	71	Chevy	DAY; 25	CAR; 35	RCH; DNQ	ATL; 36	DAR; 28	BRI; 10	NWS; 29	MAR; DNQ	TAL; 16	SON; 25	CLT; DNQ	DOV; 18	POC; 33	MCH; DNQ	DAY; 27	NHA; 18	POC; 26	TAL; 27	IND; 41	GLN; 21	MCH; 36	BRI; DNQ	DAR; 28	RCH; 29	DOV; 35	MAR; DNQ	NWS; 24	CLT; DNQ	CAR; 34	PHO; 19	ATL; DNQ							
1995	Dave Marcis	71	Chevy	DAY; 36	CAR; 23	RCH; 20	ATL; 28	DAR; 24	BRI; 34	NWS; 34	MAR; 23	TAL; 34	SON; 27	CLT; 37	DOV; 36	POC; 31	MCH; 15	DAY; 25	NHA; 29	POC; 33	TAL; 19	IND; DNQ	GLN; 24	MCH; 25	BRI; 27	DAR; 37	RCH; 35	DOV; 27	MAR; DNQ	NWS; 28	CLT; 40	CAR; DNQ	PHO; 28	ATL; 37							
1996	Dave Marcis	71	Chevy	DAY; 15	CAR; 21	RCH; 35	ATL; 29	DAR; 23	BRI; DNQ	NWS; DNQ	MAR; 35	TAL; 39	SON; 33	CLT; 40	DOV; 31	POC; DNQ	MCH; 26	DAY; 36	NHA; 39	POC; 28	TAL; 11	IND; 35	GLN; 28	MCH; 40	BRI; 27	DAR; 30	RCH; 34	DOV; 26	MAR; 29	NWS; 29	CLT; DNQ	CAR; 30	PHO; 24	ATL; 25						34th	2047
1997	Dave Marcis	71	Chevy	DAY; 17	CAR; 30	RCH; 37	ATL; DNQ	DAR; 28	TEX; 15	BRI; 30	MAR; 38	SON; 25	TAL; 30	CLT; DNQ	DOV; 25	POC; DNQ	MCH; 34	CAL; 40	DAY; 17	NHA; 35	POC; 41	IND; DNQ	GLN; DNQ	MCH; DNQ	BRI; DNQ	DAR; DNQ	RCH; DNQ	NHA; 29	DOV; 34	MAR; DNQ	CLT; DNQ	TAL; 25	CAR; DNQ	PHO; 34	ATL; DNQ					41st	1721
1998	Dave Marcis	71	Chevy	DAY; 36	CAR; DNQ	LVS; DNQ	ATL; DNQ	DAR; DNQ	BRI; DNQ	TEX; 28	MAR; DNQ	TAL; 27	CAL; DNQ	CLT; DNQ	DOV; 30	RCH; 36	MCH; DNQ	POC; DNQ	SON; DNQ	NHA; DNQ	POC; 43	IND; 41	GLN; DNQ	MCH; DNQ	BRI; DNQ	NHA; 35	DAR; DNQ	RCH; 33	DOV; DNQ	MAR; 26	CLT; DNQ	TAL; 12	DAY; 21	PHO; DNQ	CAR; DNQ	ATL; 27				44th	1470
1999	Dave Marcis	71	Chevy	DAY; 16	CAR; 34	LVS; DNQ	ATL; 34	DAR; DNQ	TEX; DNQ	BRI; 34	MAR; DNQ	TAL; 23	CAL; 33	RCH; DNQ	CLT; DNQ	DOV; 38	MCH; DNQ	POC; 41		DAY; 31	NHA; DNQ	POC; 30	IND; 40	GLN; DNQ	MCH; 33	BRI; 34	DAR; 33	RCH; DNQ	NHA; 25	DOV; 39	MAR; 34	CLT; DNQ	TAL; 38	CAR; DNQ	PHO; 34	HOM; DNQ	ATL; 28			43rd	1689
1999	R. K. Smith	71	Chevy																SON; DNQ																					43rd	1689
2000	Dave Marcis	71	Chevy	DAY; DNQ	CAR; 41	LVS; DNQ	ATL; DNQ	DAR; 33	BRI; DNQ	TEX; DNQ	MAR; DNQ	TAL; 38	CAL; DNQ	RCH; DNQ	CLT; DNQ	DOV; 29	MCH; DNQ	POC; 29		DAY; DNQ	NHA; DNQ	POC; 37	IND; DNQ			BRI; 31	DAR; 23	RCH; DNQ	NHA; DNQ	DOV; 28	MAR; DNQ	CLT; DNQ	TAL; 40	CAR; 31	PHO; DNQ	HOM; DNQ				46th	1298
2000	R. K. Smith	71	Chevy																SON; DNQ					GLN; DNQ																46th	1298
2000	Kerry Earnhardt	71	Chevy																						MCH; 43															46th	1298
2000	Dick Trickle	71	Chevy																																		ATL; DNQ			46th	1298
2001	Dave Marcis	71	Chevy	DAY; DNQ	CAR	LVS	ATL	DAR; DNQ	BRI	TEX	MAR	TAL; 38	CAL	RCH	CLT	DOV; DNQ	MCH	POC	SON	DAY; 36	CHI; DNQ	NHA	POC	IND; DNQ	GLN	MCH	BRI; DNQ	DAR; DNQ	RCH	DOV; DNQ	KAN	CLT	MAR; 32	TAL; DNQ	PHO			ATL; DNQ	NHA	47th	467
2001	Dick Trickle	71	Chevy																														MAR; QL^{†}			CAR; 33	HOM			47th	467
2002	Dave Marcis	71	Chevy	DAY; 42																																				46th	515
2002	Dick Trickle	71	Chevy		CAR; DNQ	LVS	ATL; 42		BRI; 42							DOV; 42	POC	MCH	SON	DAY	CHI	NHA	POC																	46th	515
2002	Andy Hillenburg	71	Chevy					DAR; 43			MAR; 43	TAL	CAL	RCH	CLT																									46th	515
2002	Jay Sauter	71	Chevy							TEX; 37																							TAL; 43	CLT	MAR	ATL				46th	515
2002	Jim Sauter	71	Chevy																					IND; DNQ	GLN	MCH														46th	515
2002	Tim Sauter	71	Chevy																								BRI; DNQ	DAR	RCH; 37	NHA	DOV; 34	KAN					CAR; DNQ	PHO	HOM	46th	515
2003	Tim Sauter	71	Chevy	DAY	CAR	LVS	ATL	DAR	BRI	TEX	TAL	MAR	CAL	RCH	CLT	DOV	POC	MCH	SON	DAY	CHI	NHA; DNQ	POC								DOV; DNQ	TAL	KAN	CLT	MAR	ATL	PHO	CAR; DNQ	HOM	64th	91
2003	Jim Sauter	71	Chevy																					IND; DNQ	GLN	MCH	BRI	DAR	RCH	NHA										64th	91
^{†}Qualified for Dave Marcis

==== Car No. 72 results ====
NASCAR Winston Cup Series results
Year	Driver	No.	Make	1	2	3	4	5	6	7	8	9	10	11	12	13	14	15	16	17	18	19	20	21	22	23	24	25	26	27	28	29	30	31	32	33	34	35	36	Owners	Pts
1995	Jim Sauter	72	Chevy	DAY; DNQ	CAR	RCH	ATL	DAR	BRI	NWS	MAR	TAL	SON	CLT	DOV	POC	MCH	DAY	NHA	POC	TAL	IND	GLN	MCH	BRI	DAR	RCH	DOV	MAR	NWS	CLT	CAR	PHO	ATL						N/A	-
1996	Jim Sauter	72	Chevy	DAY; DNQ	CAR	RCH	ATL	DAR	BRI	NWS	MAR	TAL	SON	CLT	DOV	POC	MCH	DAY	NHA	POC	TAL	IND	GLN	MCH	BRI	DAR	RCH	DOV	MAR	NWS	CLT	CAR	PHO	ATL						N/A	-
1999	Jim Sauter	72	Chevy	DAY; DNQ	CAR	LVS	ATL	DAR	TEX	BRI	MAR	TAL	CAL	RCH	CLT	DOV	MCH	POC	SON	DAY	NHA	POC	IND	GLN	MCH	BRI	DAR	RCH	NHA	DOV	MAR	CLT	TAL	CAR	PHO	HOM	ATL			N/A	-
2000	Jim Sauter	72	Chevy	DAY; DNQ	CAR	LVS	ATL	DAR	BRI	TEX	MAR	TAL																												58th	54
2000	Dwayne Leik	72	Chevy										CAL; DNQ	RCH	CLT	DOV	MCH	POC; DNQ	SON	DAY	NHA	POC	IND	GLN	MCH	BRI	DAR	RCH	NHA	DOV	MAR	CLT	TAL	CAR	PHO	HOM	ATL			58th	54
2001	Dwayne Leik	72	Chevy	DAY; DNQ	CAR	LVS	ATL	DAR	BRI	TEX	MAR	TAL	CAL	RCH	CLT	DOV	MCH	POC	SON	DAY	CHI	NHA	POC	IND	GLN	MCH	BRI	DAR	RCH	DOV	KAN	CLT	MAR	TAL	PHO	CAR	HOM	ATL	NHA	71st	7
2002	Dwayne Leik	72	Chevy	DAY; DNQ	CAR	LVS	ATL	DAR	BRI	TEX	MAR	TAL	CAL	RCH	CLT	DOV	POC	MCH	SON	DAY	CHI	NHA	POC	IND	GLN	MCH	BRI	DAR	RCH	NHA	DOV	KAN	TAL	CLT	MAR	ATL	CAR	PHO	HOM	N/A	-
