= Jerry Oliver (racing driver) =

American racing driver (1944–2004)

- Born: January 18, 1944; Walnut Creek, California, U.S.
- Died: January 1, 2004 (aged 59); Concord, California, U.S.

NASCAR Cup Series career
- 9 races run over 7 years
- Best finish: 65th (1967)
- First race: 1966 Motor Trend 500 (Riverside)
- Last race: 1972 Winston Western 500 (Riverside)
Wins	Top tens	Poles
0	2	0

ARCA Menards Series West career
- 61 races run over 8 years
- Best finish: 3rd (1970)
- First race: 1966 Motor Trend 500 (Riverside)
- Last race: 1975 Monterey Triple Crown (Laguna Seca)
Wins	Top tens	Poles
0	29	0
- Statistics up to date as of September 4, 2026.

Jerry Oliver (January 18, 1944 – January 1, 2004) was an American professional stock car racing driver. He competed in the NASCAR Winston Cup Series and NASCAR Winston West Series between 1966 and 1975.

== Racing career ==
Oliver began racing go-karts at a young age.

He made a start in the USAC Stock Car Series in 1965 at Hanford Motor Speedway, finishing twenty-third.

Oliver simultaneously made his NASCAR Grand National Series and NASCAR Pacific Coast Late Model Division debut in a combination race at Riverside International Raceway in 1966, finishing 20th due to gear shift issues; although this was his lone Grand National start of the season, he scored six top-tens across ten further Pacific Coast Late Model starts.

Oliver competed in eight Pacific Coast Late Model races in 1967, scoring five top-tens, including a best of fourth at Capital Speedway. In the combination race at Riverside, Oliver finished in 11th.

His only NASCAR start of 1968 came in the combination race at Riverside, where he finished 28th due to differential issues. He also made his SCCA Trans-American Championship at Riverside, finishing seventh in class and ninth overall.

Oliver ran at least 14 Pacific Coast Late Model races in 1969, but would only finish inside the top-ten in three of them, failing to finish most races due to various issues. In the combination race at Riverside, he finished 31st due to transmission issues. He competed in a Trans-American Championship race at Sonoma Raceway, finishing 12th in class and 13th overall.

Oliver ran his only full-time NASCAR season in 1970 in the renamed Grand National West, scoring 12 top-tens in nineteen races. He finished a career-high third in the standings. In the first Riverside combination race, Oliver scored his first Grand National Series top-ten with a ninth place result, while he finished 22nd in the second Riverside race due to engine issues. He also made three Trans-American Championship races, coming at Laguna Seca Raceway, Pacific Raceways, and Riverside, with a best finish of 11th at Laguna Seca.

Oliver ran only three races in the renamed Winston West Series in 1971, scoring a best finish of fifth, which doubled as his first and only top-five in the renamed Winston Cup Series. He made his final Trans-American Championship start at Riverside, finishing 18th.

Oliver made his final Winston Cup start in 1972, where he finished 22nd at Riverside; in his final attempt at Ontario Motor Speedway, he failed to qualify. He also failed to qualify for a Winston West race at Saugus Speedway.

He next competed in NASCAR in 1974, where he competed in four Winston West races, scoring his final top-ten at Stockton 99 Speedway.

Oliver made his final start in 1975 at Laguna Seca, where after starting fourth, he finished 22nd due to transmission issues.

== Personal life ==
Oliver grew up in Walnut Creek, California, where he attended Las Lomas High School. He worked with his father, Don, of Oliver & Son Cement Contractors, which was established by his grandfather in 1916. Oliver took over the business as a third generation owner when his father retired. Oliver had three children and four grandchildren.

== Motorsports career results ==
=== NASCAR ===
(key) (Bold – Pole position awarded by qualifying time. Italics – Pole position earned by points standings or practice time. * – Most laps led.)

==== Grand National Series ====
NASCAR Grand National Series results
Year	Team	No.	Make	1	2	3	4	5	6	7	8	9	10	11	12	13	14	15	16	17	18	19	20	21	22	23	24	25	26	27	28	29	30	31	32	33	34	35	36	37	38	39	40	41	42	43	44	45	46	47	48	49	50	51	52	53	54	NGNC	Pts	Ref
1966	Cos Cancilla	8	Chevy	AUG	RSD; 20	DAY	DAY	DAY	CAR	BRI	ATL	HCY	CLB	GPS	BGS	NWS	MAR	DAR	LGY	MGR	MON	RCH	CLT	DTS	ASH	PIF	SMR	AWS	BLV	GPS	DAY	ODS	BRR	OXF	FON	ISP	BRI	SMR	NSV	ATL	CLB	AWS	BLV	BGS	DAR	HCY	RCH	HBO	MAR	NWS	CLT	CAR						NA	NA	
1967	Oliver Racing	8	Chevy	AUG	RSD; 11	DAY	DAY	DAY	AWS	BRI	GPS	BGS	ATL	CLB	HCY	NWS	MAR	SVH	RCH	DAR	BLV	LGY	CLT	ASH	MGR	SMR	BIR	CAR	GPS	MGY	DAY	TRN	OXF	FDA	ISP	BRI	SMR	NSV	ATL	BGS	CLB	SVH	DAR	HCY	RCH	BLV	HBO	MAR	NWS	CLT	CAR	AWS						65th	2014	
1968	Oliver Racing	8	Chevy	MGR	MGY	RSD; 28	DAY	BRI	RCH	ATL	HCY	GPS	CLB	NWS	MAR	AUG	AWS	DAR	BLV	LGY	CLT	ASH	MGR	SMR	BIR	CAR	GPS	DAY	ISP	OXF	FDA	TRN	BRI	SMR	NSV	ATL	CLB	BGS	AWS	SBO	LGY	DAR	HCY	RCH	BLV	HBO	MAR	NWS	AUG	CLT	CAR	JFC						92nd	NA	
1969	Cos Cancilla	16	Olds	MGR	MGY	RSD; 31	DAY	DAY	DAY	CAR	AUG	BRI	ATL	CLB	HCY	GPS	RCH	NWS	MAR	AWS	DAR	BLV	LGY	CLT	MGR	SMR	MCH	KPT	GPS	NCF	DAY	DOV	TPN	TRN	BLV	BRI	NSV	SMR	ATL	MCH	SBO	BGS	AWS	DAR	HCY	RCH	TAL	CLB	MAR	NWS	CLT	SVH	AUG	CAR	JFC	MGR	TWS	NA	NA	
1970	Cos Cancilla	116	Olds	RSD; 9	DAY	DAY	DAY	RCH	CAR	SVH	ATL	BRI	TAL	NWS	CLB	DAR	BLV	LGY	CLT	SMR	MAR	MCH																																				70th	126	
1970	Cos Cancilla	0	Olds																				RSD; 22	HCY	KPT	GPS	DAY	AST	TPN	TRN	BRI	SMR	NSV	ATL	CLB	ONA	MCH	TAL	BGS	SBO	DAR	HCY	RCH	DOV	NCF	NWS	CLT	MAR	MGR	CAR	LGY							70th	126	

==== Winston Cup Series ====
NASCAR Winston Cup Series results
Year	Team	No.	Make	1	2	3	4	5	6	7	8	9	10	11	12	13	14	15	16	17	18	19	20	21	22	23	24	25	26	27	28	29	30	31	32	33	34	35	36	37	38	39	40	41	42	43	44	45	46	47	48	NWCC	Pts	Ref
1971	Cos Cancilla	6	Olds	RSD; 29	DAY	DAY	DAY	ONT	RCH	CAR	HCY	BRI	ATL	CLB	GPS	SMR	NWS	MAR	DAR	SBO	TAL	ASH	KPT	CLT	DOV	MCH																										NA	NA	
1971	Cos Cancilla	6	Dodge																								RSD; 5	HOU	GPS	DAY	BRI	AST	ISP	TRN	NSV	ATL	BGS	ONA	MCH	TAL	CLB	HCY	DAR	MAR	CLT	DOV	CAR	MGR	RCH	NWS	TWS	NA	NA	
1972	Cos Cancilla	6	Olds	RSD; 22	DAY	RCH																																														101st	210.5	
1972	Cos Cancilla	6W	Olds				ONT; DNQ	CAR	ATL	BRI	DAR	NWS	MAR	TAL	CLT	DOV	MCH	RSD	TWS	DAY	BRI	TRN	ATL	TAL	MCH	NSV	DAR	RCH	DOV	MAR	NWS	CLT	CAR	TWS																		101st	210.5	

=== Winston West Series ===
NASCAR Winston West Series results
Year	Team	No.	Make	1	2	3	4	5	6	7	8	9	10	11	12	13	14	15	16	17	18	19	20	21	22	23	24	25	26	27	28	29	30	NWWC	Pts	Ref
1966	Cos Cancilla	8	Chevy	RSD; 20																														7th	1836	
1966	Cos Cancilla	6	Olds		S99; 8	ASP; 10	ASP; 13	DCS; 13	POR; 10	ASP; 14	OSS	VAL	S99			POR; 7																		7th	1836	
1966	Don Oliver	8	Chevy											ASP; 13	AMP		SGV; 7	CSF; 5																7th	1836	
1967	Oliver Racing	8	Chevy	AMP; 8	SGV; 6	RSD; 5					ASP; 11	SGV	OSS	ASP																				9th	1922	
1967	Cos Cancilla	16	Olds				CPS; 4								ACF; 14	RVR	SAL	JBA	YAK	EVG	ASP	CSP; 5												9th	1922	
1967	Bob Bristol	18	Chevy					SHA; 4	SAL	POR																								9th	1922	
1968	Oliver Racing	8	Chevy	RSD; 28	ASP	KEA	VAL	ASP	AMP	DCS	POR	EVG	EUG	MED	OSS	TCR	YAK	EVG	EUR	BKS	S99	CSP	SGS											NA	NA	
1969	Cos Cancilla	16	Olds	RSD; 31	CSF; 19	SGV; 10	SON; 18	EVG	TCR; 5	YAK; 16	DCS; 6	SAL; 15	JBA; 11	OSS; 11	SGS; 16	SON; 14	YAK; 11	EVG; 0†	CPR	POR	SMS	SGV	TWS											10th	726	
1970	Cos Cancilla	116	Olds	RSD; 9																														3rd	971	
1970	Cos Cancilla	18	Olds		ASP; 9												SPS; 12	TCR; 4																3rd	971	
1970	Cos Cancilla	6	Olds			SGB; 7	CSF; 4		YAK; 8	EVG; 20	JBA; 11	CRS; 11	OSS; 7	SGS; 8	MED; 9	SAL; 5			WSP; 7	S99; 12	ASP; 5	SGB; 27												3rd	971	
1970	Cos Cancilla	0	Olds					RSD; 22																										3rd	971	
1971	Cos Cancilla	6	Olds	RSD; 29	ONT	OSS	SJS	CRS	S99; 6	ASP																								33rd	249	
1971	Cos Cancilla	6	Dodge								RSD; 5	SAL	SPS	SKA	USP	POR	LSP	MED	DCS	CRS	OSS	SGS	BKS	CSP	EVG	IFS	YAK	SGB	TWS					33rd	249	
1972	Cos Cancilla	6W	Olds	RSD	ONT; DNQ	SJS	S99	SMN	TCR	YAK	EVG	RSD	MED	POR	IFS	MER	SPS	LSP	WSP	SKA	RAS	CRS	OSS											NA	0	
1972	J. A. Delvecchio	11	Dodge																					SGS; DNQ	CSP	BKS	EVG	USP	YAK	POR	ASP	WCR	SMN	NA	0	
1974	Oliver Racing	11	Chevy	RSD	AMP; 24	S99; 6	MSP	COR	SBP	ASP	RSD	WER	WSP	SPS	STA	USP	POR	MED	EUG	CBS	CAJ	CRS	ASP	AMP; 20	CSP	EVG	YAK	POR	SGB; 13	ASP	ONT			40th	207.75	
1975	Oliver Racing	0	Chevy	RSD	LAG; 22	MSP	ASP	RSD	ASP	USP	POR	EVG	SMS	CRS	CSP	ASP	EVG	YAK	POR	MSP	ONT													NA	38.75	

† - It is known Olier participated in this race, but his final position is unknown.
