= Ray Elder =

American racing driver (1942–2011)

- Ray Elder
- Born: Raymond Marvin Elder; August 19, 1942; Caruthers, California, U.S.
- Died: November 24, 2011 (aged 69); Caruthers, California, U.S.
- Awards: West Coast Stock Car Hall of Fame (2002 - Inaugural Class); NASCAR Winston West Series champion (1969, 1970, 1971, 1972, 1974, 1975)

NASCAR Cup Series career
- 31 races run over 12 years
- Best finish: 48th (1969)
- First race: 1967 Motor Trend 500 (Riverside)
- Last race: 1978 Los Angeles Times 500 (Ontario)
- First win: 1971 Motor Trend 500 (Riverside)
- Last win: 1972 Golden State 400 (Riverside)
Wins	Top tens	Poles
2	16	0

ARCA Menards Series West career
- 240 races run over 14 years
- Best finish: 1st (1969, 1970, 1971, 1972, 1974, 1975)
- First race: 1966 Race 2 (Stockton)
- Last race: 1983 Warner W. Hodgdon 200 (Riverside)
- First win: 1966 Ascot Park 200 Lappers (Ascot Park)
- Last win: 1978 Winston Petaluma 100 (Petaluma)
Wins	Top tens	Poles
47	189	44
- Statistics up to date as of March 5, 2025.

Raymond Marvin Elder (August 19, 1942 – November 24, 2011) was an American professional stock car racing driver. He competed in the NASCAR Winston Cup Series and NASCAR Winston West Series.

Elder participated primarily in west coast races at Riverside International Raceway and Ontario Motor Speedway from 1967 to 1978. He won races at Riverside in 1971 and 1972 driving for Fred Elder. Elder won 47 races in the NASCAR Winston West Series, which is the second most all time. He won six NASCAR West series championships: 1969, 1970, 1971, 1972, 1974, and 1975.

Winning the 1971 Motor Trend 500 race would essentially make Elder the first winner in NASCAR's "modern" history.

Elder graduated from Caruthers High School, earning Central California All-Star honors in football. His family owned a 240-acre farm about 15 miles southwest of Fresno, and he was joined on his pit crew by his brother and father.

== Motorsports career results ==
=== NASCAR ===
(key) (Bold – Pole position awarded by qualifying time. Italics – Pole position earned by points standings or practice time. * – Most laps led.)

==== Grand National Series ====
NASCAR Grand National Series results
Year	Team	No.	Make	1	2	3	4	5	6	7	8	9	10	11	12	13	14	15	16	17	18	19	20	21	22	23	24	25	26	27	28	29	30	31	32	33	34	35	36	37	38	39	40	41	42	43	44	45	46	47	48	49	50	51	52	53	54	NGNC	Pts	Ref
1967	Elder Racing	96	Dodge	AUG	RSD; 36	DAY	DAY	DAY	AWS	BRI	GPS	BGS	ATL	CLB	HCY	NWS	MAR	SVH	RCH	DAR	BLV	LGY	CLT	ASH	MGR	SMR	BIR	CAR	GPS	MGY	DAY	TRN	OXF	FDA	ISP	BRI	SMR	NSV	ATL	BGS	CLB	SVH	DAR	HCY	RCH	BLV	HBO	MAR	NWS	CLT	CAR	AWS						115th	106	
1968	Elder Racing	96	Dodge	MGR	MGY	RSD; 30	DAY	BRI	RCH	ATL	HCY	GPS	CLB	NWS	MAR	AUG	AWS	DAR	BLV	LGY	CLT	ASH	MGR	SMR	BIR	CAR	GPS	DAY	ISP	OXF	FDA	TRN	BRI	SMR	NSV	ATL	CLB	BGS	AWS	SBO	LGY	DAR	HCY	RCH	BLV	HBO	MAR	NWS	AUG	CLT	CAR	JFC						96th	-	
1969	Elder Racing	96	Dodge	MGR	MGY	RSD; 7	DAY	DAY; 8	DAY; 10	CAR	AUG	BRI	ATL	CLB	HCY	GPS	RCH	NWS	MAR	AWS	DAR	BLV	LGY	CLT	MGR	SMR	MCH	KPT	GPS	NCF	DAY	DOV	TPN	TRN	BLV	BRI	NSV	SMR	ATL	MCH	SBO	BGS	AWS	DAR	HCY	RCH	TAL	CLB	MAR	NWS	CLT	SVH	AUG	CAR	JFC	MGR	TWS; 6	48th	433	
1970	Elder Racing	96	Dodge	RSD; 24	DAY	DAY; 6	DAY; 11	RCH	CAR	SVH	ATL	BRI	TAL	NWS	CLB	DAR	BLV	LGY	CLT	SMR	MAR	MCH	RSD; 19	HCY	KPT	GPS	DAY	AST	TPN	TRN	BRI	SMR	NSV	ATL	CLB	ONA	MCH	TAL	BGS	SBO	DAR	HCY	RCH	DOV	NCF	NWS	CLT	MAR	MGR	CAR	LGY							53rd	246	
1971	Elder Racing	96	Dodge	RSD; 1*	DAY	DAY	DAY	ONT; 7	RCH	CAR	HCY	BRI	ATL	CLB	GPS	SMR	NWS	MAR	DAR	SBO	TAL	ASH	KPT	CLT	DOV	MCH	RSD; 2	HOU	GPS	DAY	BRI	AST	ISP	TRN	NSV	ATL	BGS	ONA	MCH	TAL	CLB	HCY	DAR	MAR	CLT	DOV	CAR	MGR	RCH	NWS	TWS; 46							NA	0	

==== Winston Cup Series ====
NASCAR Winston Cup Series results
Year	Team	No.	Make	1	2	3	4	5	6	7	8	9	10	11	12	13	14	15	16	17	18	19	20	21	22	23	24	25	26	27	28	29	30	31	NWCC	Pts	Ref
1972	Elder Racing	96	Dodge	RSD; 4	DAY	RCH												RSD; 1	TWS	DAY	BRI	TRN	ATL	TAL	MCH	NSV	DAR	RCH	DOV	MAR	NWS	CLT	CAR	TWS	52nd	902.25	
1972	Elder Racing	96W	Dodge				ONT; 5	CAR	ATL	BRI	DAR	NWS	MAR	TAL	CLT	DOV	MCH																		52nd	902.25	
1973	Elder Racing	96	Dodge	RSD; 3	DAY; 18	RCH	CAR	BRI	ATL	NWS	DAR	MAR	TAL	NSV	CLT	DOV	TWS	RSD; 36	MCH	DAY	BRI	ATL	TAL	NSV	DAR	RCH	DOV	NWS	MAR	CLT	CAR				58th	-	
1974	Elder Racing	96	Dodge	RSD; 34	DAY	RCH	CAR	BRI	ATL	DAR	NWS	MAR	TAL	NSV	DOV	CLT	RSD	MCH	DAY	BRI	NSV	ATL	POC	TAL	MCH	DAR	RCH	DOV	NWS	MAR	CLT	CAR			95th	2.27	
1974	Elder Racing	96W	Dodge																														ONT; 36		95th	2.27	
1975	Elder Racing	95	Dodge	RSD; 13	DAY	RCH	CAR	BRI	ATL	NWS	DAR	MAR	TAL	NSV	DOV	CLT																			50th	372	
1975	Elder Racing	96W	Dodge														RSD; 4	MCH	DAY	NSV	POC	TAL	MCH	DAR	DOV	NWS	MAR	CLT	RCH	CAR	BRI	ATL	ONT; 25		50th	372	
1976	Elder Racing	96	Dodge	RSD; 4	DAY	CAR	RCH	BRI	ATL	NWS	DAR	MAR	TAL	NSV	DOV	CLT	RSD; 4	MCH	DAY	NSV	POC	TAL	MCH	BRI	DAR	RCH	DOV	MAR	NWS	CLT	CAR	ATL			58th	320	
1976	Ray Hill	32	Plymouth																														ONT; DNQ		58th	320	
1977	Dave Hill	32	Plymouth	RSD	DAY	RCH	CAR	ATL	NWS	DAR	BRI	MAR	TAL	NSV	DOV	CLT	RSD; 32	MCH	DAY	NSV	POC	TAL	MCH	BRI	DAR	RCH	DOV	MAR	NWS	CLT	CAR	ATL	ONT; DNQ		106th	67	
1978	Dave Hill	32	Dodge	RSD; 34	DAY	RCH	CAR	ATL	BRI	DAR	NWS	MAR	TAL	DOV	CLT	NSV	RSD; 6	MCH	DAY	NSV	POC	TAL	MCH	BRI	DAR	RCH	DOV	MAR	NWS	CLT	CAR	ATL	ONT; 40		66th	254	

===== Daytona 500 =====
Year	Team	Manufacturer	Start	Finish
1969	Elder Racing	Dodge	16	10
1970	Elder Racing	Dodge	12	11
1973	Elder Racing	Dodge	15	18

==== Winston West Series ====
NASCAR Winston West Series results
Year	Team	No.	Make	1	2	3	4	5	6	7	8	9	10	11	12	13	14	15	16	17	18	19	20	21	22	23	24	25	26	27	28	29	30	Pos.	Pts	Ref
1966	Elder Racing	96	Dodge	RSD	S99; 5	ASP; 1*	ASP; 8	DCS; 4	POR; 5	ASP; 2	OSS; 17	VSP; 3	S99; 2	ASP; 4	AMP; 14	POR; 1	SGB	CSF; 15																2nd	2534	
1967	Elder Racing	96	Dodge	AMP; 4	SGB; 12	RSD; 17	CSP; 13	SHA; 9	SAL; 13	POR; 7	ASP; 1*	SGB; 9	OSS; 2*	ASP; 6	ACF; 3	MED; 2	SAL; 2	JBA; 11	YAK; 3	EVG; 2*	ASP; 1	CSP; 11												2nd	2888	
1968	Elder Racing	96	Dodge	RSD; 15	ASP; 1*	FRE; 2	**VSP**; 18	**ASP**; 1*	AMP; 2	DCS; 3	POR; 2	EVG; 15	EUG; 5	MED; 5	OSS; 4	TCR; 1*	YAK; 7	EVG; 8	RAS; 3	BKS; 1	S99; 5	CSP; 1*	SGS; 5											2nd	1049	
1969	Elder Racing	96	Dodge	RSD; 7	**CSF**; 5	**SGB**; 18	SON; 1*	EVG; 4	TCR; 13	YAK; 12	DCS; 4*	SAL; 2	**JBA**; 2	OSS; 2	SGS; 2	**SON**; 11*	YAK; 9	EVG; 3	**CPR**; 8*	**POR**; 2*	SMS; 4	**SGB**; 1*	TWS; 6											1st	1060	
1970	Elder Racing	96	Dodge	RSD; 24	**ASP**; 1*	SGB; 2	CSF; 16	RSD; 19	**YAK**; 3	EVG; 2	**JBA**; 1*	**CRS**; 4*	OSS; 8*	SGS; 2	MED; 2*	SAL; 3	SPS; 3	**TCR**; 1	**WSP**; 5	S99; 5	ASP; 2	**SGB**; 1*												1st	1024	
1971	Elder Racing	96	Dodge	RSD; 1	ONT; 7	OSS; 2	SJS; 3	CRS; 2	S99; 2	**ASP**; 1*	RSD; 2	**SAL**; 3	SPS; 20	**SKA**; 2	USP; 1	POR; 2	**LSP**; 2	MED; 2	DCS; 2*	CRS; 1*	**OSS**; 3	**SGS**; 1*	**BKS**; 1*	CSP; 1*	**EVG**; 1*	**IFS**; 21	**YAK**; 1*	SGB; 21	TWS; 46					1st	1471	
1972	Elder Racing	96	Dodge	RSD; 4		SJS; 10	**S99**; 6	SMN; 1	TCR; 3	YAK; 2	EVG; 1*		MED; 2	POR; 5	IFS; 5		SPS; 4	**LSP**; 4	**WSP**; 6	SKA; 2*	RAS; 4	**CRS**; 12*	**OSS**; 12	**SGS**; 13	CSP; 4	BKS; 6	EVG; 1*	**USP**; 1*	YAK; 8	**POR**; 6	ASP; 7	WCR; 1*	SMN; 2	1st	3108.5	
1972	Elder Racing	96W	Dodge		ONT; 5							RSD; 1																						1st	3108.5	
1972	Elder Racing	98	Dodge													**MER**; 1*																		1st	3108.5	
1973	Elder Racing	96	Dodge	AMP; 1*	MAD; 5	S99; 2	AUR; 7*	KFS; 3	**CBS**; 3	USP; 4	POR; 20	SPS; 1	WER; 1*	**SGS**; 10		OSS; 2	CSP; 1*	**BKS**; 3	LAG; 22	EVG; 13	**WSP**; 2	YAK; 2	POR; 21	**AMP**; 7										3rd	1618.5	
1973	Kranzler Racing	4	Chevy												CAJ; 7																			3rd	1618.5	
1974	Elder Racing	96	Dodge	RSD; 34	AMP; 5	S99; 3		**COR**; 1*	SBP; 15	ASP; 19*	RSD	WER; 1	WSP; 3	SPS; 5*	STA; 5	**USP**; 3	**POR**; 3	MED; 12*	EUG; 2	**CBS**; 2	CAJ; 1	CRS; 3	ASP; 1*	AMP; 1	CSP; 2*	EVG; 4	YAK; 5	POR; 4	SGB; 5	ASP; 18				1st	1942	
1974	Elder Racing	96	Chevy				MSP; 14																											1st	1942	
1974	Elder Racing	96W	Dodge																												ONT; 36			1st	1942	
1975	Elder Racing	95	Dodge	RSD; 13																														1st	1327.5	
1975	Elder Racing	96	Dodge		LAG; 4	**MSP**; 5	ASP; 2	RSD; 4	ASP; 1	USP; 3	**POR**; 2	**EVG**; 1*	SMS; 1	CRS; 3	CSP; 3	ASP; 14	EVG; 1*	YAK; 5	POR; 6	MSP; 1*														1st	1327.5	
1975	Elder Racing	96W	Dodge																		ONT; 25													1st	1327.5	
1976	Elder Racing	96	Dodge	RSD; 4	RSD; 4	EVG	WSP	USP	POR	SHA	SGS	EVG	YAK	POR	LAG																			32nd	126	
1976	Ray Hill	32	Plymouth													ONT; DNQ																		32nd	126	
1977	Dave Hill	32	Plymouth	RSD	LAG	ONT	SJS	MMR	ASP	RSD; 32	SGS	YAK	EVG	WSP	USP	POR	AAS	CRS	ASP	SHA	POR	ONT; DNQ	PHO; 11											34th	209	
1978	Dave Hill	32	Dodge	RSD; 34	AAS; 7	S99; 7	SHA; 21	PET; 1*	MMR; 2	RSD; 6	IFS; 3	YAK; 12*	WSP; 6	LSP; 8	EVG; 9	POR; 5	CRS; 1	ASP; 18	SON; 18	SHA; 12	CBS; 6	YAK; 13	OSS; 5	ONT; 40	PHO; 7									4th	953	
1983	Elder Racing	96	Dodge	S99	SON	RSD	YAK	EVG	SHA	RSD; 16	CPL	RSD	PHO																					NA	0	

== Award ==
- Elder was inducted into the Fresno County Athletic Hall of Fame in 1990.
- Elder was inducted in the West Coast Stock Car Hall of Fame in its first class in 2002.

Achievements
Preceded by Scott Cain	NASCAR Pacific Coast Late Model Division Champion; 1969	Succeeded by Series renamed
Preceded by Series renamed	NASCAR Grand National West Champion; 1970	Succeeded by Series renamed
Preceded by Jack McCoy	NASCAR Winston West Series Champion; 1971–1972	Succeeded by Jack McCoy
Preceded by Jack McCoy	NASCAR Winston West Series Champion; 1974–1975	Succeeded by Chuck Bown
