= Dick Brooks =

American racing driver (1942–2006)

- Born: Richard Harold Brooks; April 14, 1942; Porterville, California, U.S.
- Died: February 1, 2006 (aged 63); Porterville, California, U.S.
- Awards: 1969 NASCAR Grand National Series Rookie of the Year

NASCAR Cup Series career
- 358 races run over 17 years
- Best finish: 6th (1977)
- First race: 1969 Daytona 500 qualifier No. 1 (Daytona)
- Last race: 1985 Coca-Cola World 600 (Charlotte)
- First win: 1973 Talladega 500 (Talladega)
Wins	Top tens	Poles
1	150	0

Richard Harold Brooks (April 14, 1942 – February 1, 2006) was an American NASCAR driver. Born in Porterville, California, he was the 1969 NASCAR Rookie of the Year, and went on to win the 1973 Talladega 500. Brooks held off veteran Buddy Baker by 7.2 seconds for the Talladega win. After he retired, he served as a NASCAR sportscaster for a brief period of time. His Grand National statistics include the win at Talladega Superspeedway, 57 top-fives, 150 top-tens, 4 top-ten points finishes (1975 through 1978), and 358 career races. Although Brooks only won one NASCAR race, he was a popular figure in that league of motorsports. Brooks drove for the underfunded Junie Donlavey team throughout his racing career.

== Career ==
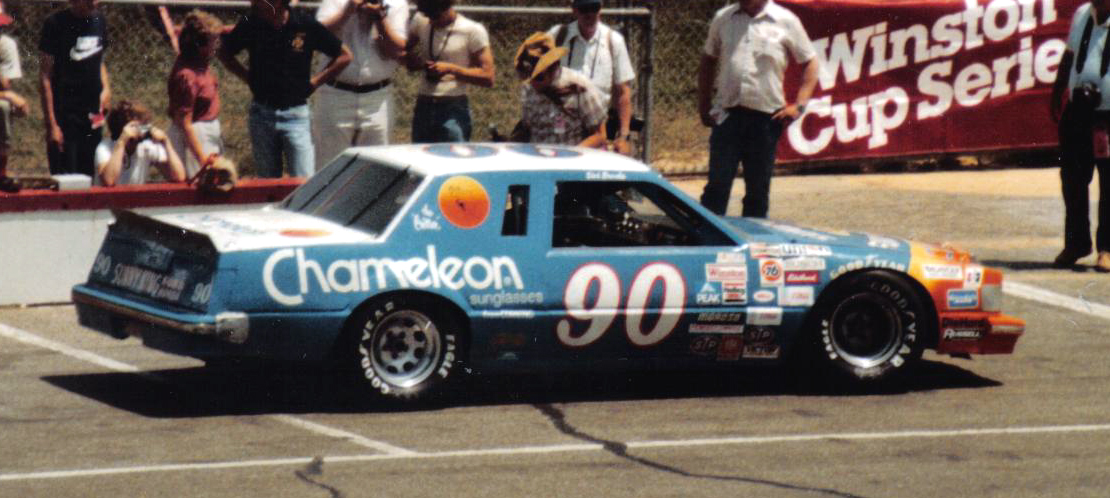
1983 racecar

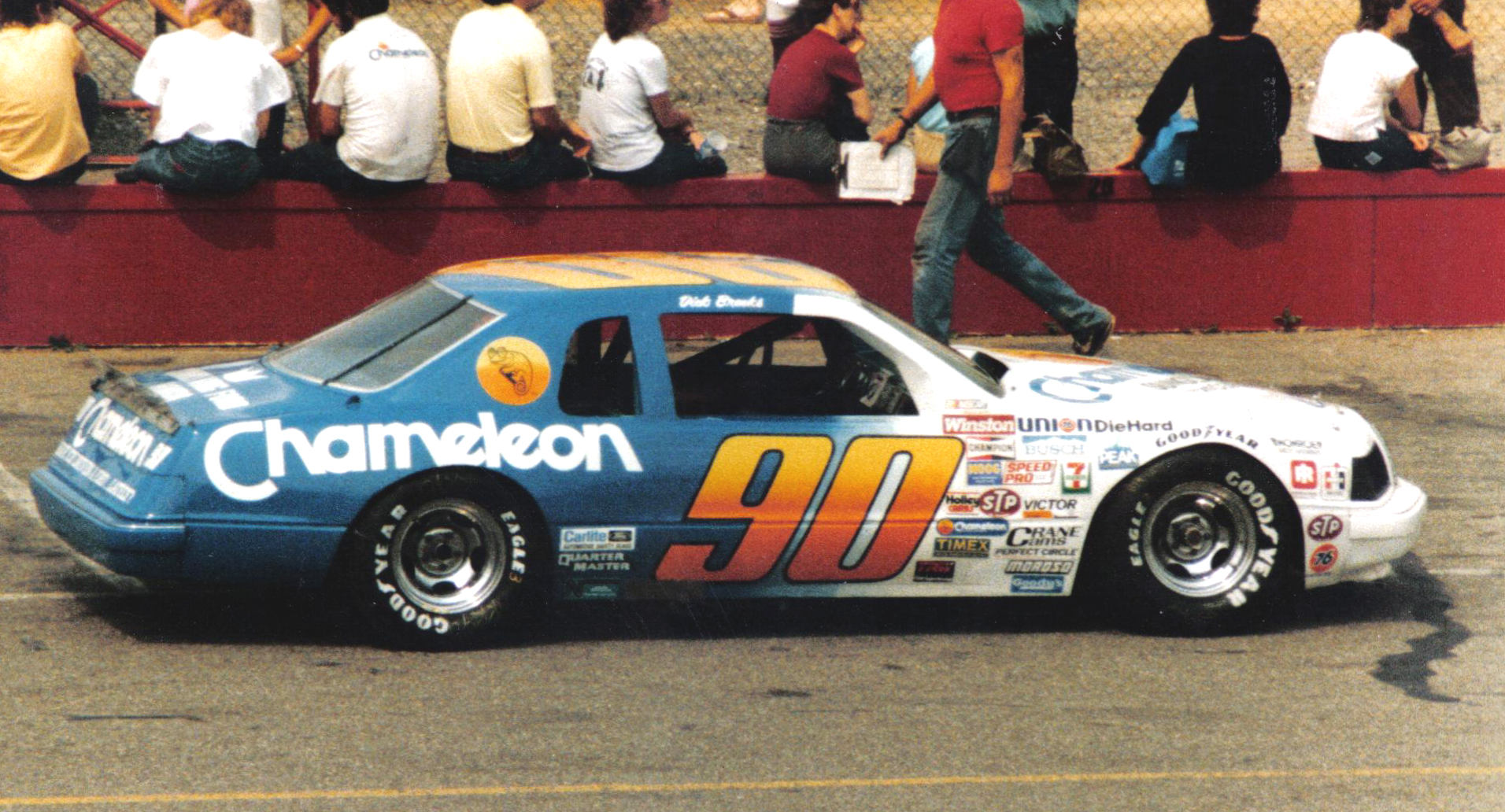
1984 racecar

Brooks made his Grand National Series debut at the first Daytona 500 Qualifying Race in 1969, driving a self-owned Plymouth. Brooks had a solid year, and with twelve top-tens he finished 21st in the final standings. This also meant Brooks became the rookie of the year. He continued to drive his Plymouth in 1970 and scored fifteen top-five finishes in 34 races, improving to thirteenth in the final points standings. Brooks came close to winning the 1970 Georgia 500, but eventually finished third to Richard Petty and Bobby Isaac after having led 133 laps. In 1971, Brooks moved to the team of Mario Rossi, driving the No. 22 Dodge. In fifteen races with the team, Books scored twelve top-ten finishes. His best run of the season came at Darlington where he finished second to Buddy Baker.

For the next two seasons, Brooks did not have a full-time ride and practically picked up whatever ride came up. Brooks started the 1972 season at the Atlanta 500, driving the No. 90 Ford for Junie Donlavey. Brooks made three additional starts for Donlavey with a best finish of eighth, at the Winston 500. Brooks also drove five races for Marvin Welty but failed to finish any of them. Brooks only finished one other race that year, when he drove for Bill Champion at the Texas 500. Brooks started out his 1973 season driving the No. 6 Owens Racing Dodge to a third place finish at the Daytona 500. He returned to Donlavey and drove eight races for that team in 1973. The highlight of Brooks's career came at the Talladega 500, when he drove the Plymouth of Jimmy Crawford to an unexpected victory. Brooks was not supposed to drive Crawford's Plymouth, but after officials ruled that Crawford did not have enough experience on the big speedway, Brooks took over the ride.

Without a ride for the 1974 season, Brooks started to field a self-owned Dodge. Of the sixteen races that Brooks entered that year, he finished three times. His best finish of the season was in the Volunteer 500 at Bristol International Speedway.

Brooks returned to Donlavey for the 1975 season, driving the No. 90 Ford once again. In 25 races, Brooks scored fifteen top-ten finishes of which he finished six in the top-five. His best result that season was a second place, in the Delaware 500 at Dover Downs International Speedway. Brooks also finished in the top-ten in the final points standings for the first time. He continued to drive for Donlavey Racing in 1976. Brooks scored eighteen top-ten finishes that year and he finished tenth in the final points standings for the second year in succession. Brooks continued his good run for Donlavey Racing in 1977. He scored a total of twenty top-ten finishes that season of which he finished seven in the top five. He finished sixth in the final points standings, which would turn out to be a career high. Brooks had another good year in 1978, with seventeen top-ten finishes. He finished eighth in the final points standings and left the Donlavey team at the end of the season.

Brooks moved to the team of Nelson Malloch in 1979, driving the No. 05 Oldsmobile and Chevy. Brooks had a lot of mechanical issues during the season and only managed to finish thirteen of 27 races that year. Brooks scored eight top-ten finishes during the year and finished 22nd in the final points standings. He stayed with Malloch for the 1980 season but left the team after he only finished five of the first sixteen races. Brooks entered in three more races that season, which he drove for Banjo Matthews.

Brooks only drove five races each season in 1981 and 1982 before reuniting with Donlavey for 1983. After finishing fifth in the Daytona 500, he had several other solid runs. After four races, Brooks led the point standings for the only time in his NASCAR career. Brooks faded to fourteenth at season's end. In 1984, the Donlavey team struggled to keep up with the better-financed teams and Brooks finished fifteenth, although he did have a notable performance in the third race of the year at Rockingham: he led 169 laps, but retired on lap 384. This was the only time in Brooks's career that he led the most laps during a race. After driving three races for the Petty Enterprises team in 1985, Brooks left. His final NASCAR race was behind the wheel of a Rick Hendrick-owned car in the 1985 World 600 where he finished in tenth place.

Midway through the 1994 season, Brooks purchased the No. 40 Pontiac team from SABCO Racing, inheriting driver Bobby Hamilton and sponsor Kendall Oil. Hamilton left for Petty Enterprises in 1995, and Brooks fielded the No. 40 for Greg Sacks, Rich Bickle, Shane Hall, Andy Hillenburg, Randy LaJoie, and Butch Leitzinger, but after a season which saw the car lead only two laps with a best finish of twelfth, Brooks sold the team back to SABCO.

== Later life and death ==
Brooks lent his name to a series of car dealerships in North and South Carolina.

After complications from a plane crash in late 2004, Brooks died of pneumonia on February 1, 2006.

== Motorsports career results ==
=== NASCAR ===
(key) (Bold – Pole position awarded by qualifying time Italics – Pole position earned by points standings or practice time * – Most laps led)

==== Grand National Series ====
NASCAR Grand National Series results
Year	Team	No.	Make	1	2	3	4	5	6	7	8	9	10	11	12	13	14	15	16	17	18	19	20	21	22	23	24	25	26	27	28	29	30	31	32	33	34	35	36	37	38	39	40	41	42	43	44	45	46	47	48	49	50	51	52	53	54	NGNC	Pts	Ref
1969	Brooks Racing	32	Plymouth	MGR	MGY	RSD	DAY; 16	DAY	DAY; 32	CAR; 12	AUG	BRI	ATL; 40	CLB	HCY	GPS	RCH	NWS; 18	MAR; 16	AWS; 7	DAR; 30	BLV	LGY	CLT; 33	MGR; 9	SMR	MCH; 24	KPT	GPS	NCF	DAY; 28	DOV	TPN	TRN; 8	BLV	BRI; 25	NSV	SMR	ATL; 10	MCH; 31	SBO	BGS	AWS; 3	DAR; 7	HCY; 6	RCH; 24	TAL; 5	CLB	MAR; 35	NWS; 8	CLT; 6	SVH; 25	AUG	CAR; 6	JFC	MGR; 24	TWS; 5	21st	1780	
1970	Brooks Racing	32	Plymouth	RSD; 33	DAY; 7	DAY	DAY; 19	RCH	CAR; 3	SVH	ATL; 26	BRI; 5	TAL; 13	NWS; 5	CLB	DAR; 2	BLV	LGY	CLT; 31	SMR; 4	MAR; 5			HCY; 2	KPT	GPS; 3	DAY; 5	AST	TPN; 4	TRN; 4	BRI; 26	SMR; 3	NSV; 35	ATL; 26	CLB; 17	ONA	MCH; 3	TAL; 40	BGS	SBO	DAR; 8	HCY; 4	RCH; 9	DOV	NCF	NWS; 26	CLT; 30	MAR; 16	MGR; 3	CAR; 39	LGY							13th	2460	
1970	Dennis Gallion	86	Dodge																			MCH; 37	RSD; 30																																			13th	2460	
1971	Mario Rossi	22	Dodge	RSD	DAY	DAY; 3	DAY; 7	ONT; 5	RCH	CAR; 5	HCY; 14	BRI; 3	ATL; 14	CLB; 3	GPS; 3	SMR; 5	NWS; 3	MAR; 23	DAR; 2	SBO	TAL	ASH	KPT	CLT; 10	DOV	MCH; 8	RSD	HOU	GPS	DAY	BRI	AST	ISP	TRN	NSV	ATL	BGS	ONA	MCH	TAL	CLB																	36th	939	
1971		95	Chevy																																							HCY; 22																36th	939	
1971	Ferguson-Stephens	66	Pontiac																																								DAR; 39															36th	939	
1971	Ferguson-Stephens	66	Ford																																									MAR; 26	CLT; 39	DOV	CAR											36th	939	
1971	Brooks Racing	32	Plymouth																																													MGR; 20	RCH	NWS	TWS							36th	939	

==== Winston Cup Series ====
NASCAR Winston Cup Series results
Year	Team	No.	Make	1	2	3	4	5	6	7	8	9	10	11	12	13	14	15	16	17	18	19	20	21	22	23	24	25	26	27	28	29	30	31	NWCC	Pts	Ref
1972	Donlavey Racing	90	Ford	RSD	DAY	RCH	ONT	CAR	ATL; 40	BRI							MCH; 27								MCH; 40	NSV									49th	1023.5	
1972	Blank & Kalashian	66	Pontiac								DAR; 35	NWS	MAR																						49th	1023.5	
1972	Donlavey Racing	98	Ford											TAL; 8																					49th	1023.5	
1972	Marvin Welty	73	Ford												CLT; 36	DOV		RSD; 33	TWS; 35	DAY	BRI	TRN	ATL; 38	TAL; 40											49th	1023.5	
1972	Seifert Racing	45	Mercury																								DAR; 32	RCH	DOV	MAR	NWS	CLT; 40			49th	1023.5	
1972	Bud Moore Engineering	15	Ford																														CAR; 34		49th	1023.5	
1972	Champion Racing	1	Ford																															TWS; 17	49th	1023.5	
1973	Owens Racing	6	Dodge	RSD	DAY; 3	RCH																													27th	3200.7	
1973	Donlavey Racing	90	Ford				CAR; 5	BRI							CLT; 9	DOV	TWS	RSD	MCH	DAY; 9	BRI	ATL													27th	3200.7	
1973	Donlavey Racing	90	Mercury						ATL; 7	NWS														NSV; 32		RCH; 27	DOV	NWS; 8	MAR						27th	3200.7	
1973	Donlavey Racing	98	Ford								DAR; 11	MAR																							27th	3200.7	
1973	Crawford Racing	22	Plymouth										TAL; 23	NSV									TAL; 1												27th	3200.7	
1973	B & B Racing	61	Chevy																						DAR; 9										27th	3200.7	
1973	Brooks Racing	32	Dodge																											CLT; 34	CAR; 7				27th	3200.7	
1974	Brooks Racing	32	Dodge	RSD	DAY; 9	RCH	CAR; 12	BRI	ATL; 24	DAR; 29	NWS; 24	MAR	TAL; 29	NSV	DOV	CLT; 27	RSD	MCH; 19	DAY; 15	BRI; 7	NSV	ATL	POC	TAL; 29	MCH; 8	DAR; 34	RCH; 16	DOV	NWS	MAR	CLT; 36				27th	267.52	
1974	Brooks Racing	28	Chevy																													CAR; 31	ONT		27th	267.52	
1975	Donlavey Racing	90	Ford	RSD	DAY; 22	RCH; 4	CAR; 4	BRI; 19	ATL; 4	NWS; 8	DAR; 25	MAR; 8	TAL; 3	NSV	DOV; 29	CLT; 7	RSD	MCH; 7	DAY; 6	NSV	POC	TAL; 38	MCH; 20	DAR; 26	DOV; 2	NWS; 11	MAR; 6	CLT; 35	RCH; 3	CAR; 29	BRI; 6	ATL; 7	ONT; 8		10th	3182	
1976	Miller Racing	95	Chevy	RSD; 33																															10th	3447	
1976	Donlavey Racing	90	Ford		DAY; 41	CAR; 24	RCH; 26	BRI; 6	ATL; 7	NWS; 7	DAR; 35	MAR; 5	TAL; 12	NSV	DOV; 7	CLT; 7	RSD	MCH; 6	DAY; 8		POC; 31	TAL; 3	MCH; 29	BRI; 7	DAR; 6	RCH; 8	DOV; 6	MAR; 6	NWS; 6	CLT; 9	CAR; 8	ATL; 29	ONT; 4		10th	3447	
1976	Langley Racing	64	Ford																	NSV; 29															10th	3447	
1977	Donlavey Racing	90	Ford	RSD	DAY; 5	RCH; 27	CAR; 22	ATL; 23	NWS; 6	DAR; 9	BRI; 2	MAR; 6	TAL; 7		DOV; 5	CLT; 8		MCH; 7	DAY; 9	NSV; 5	POC; 5	TAL; 39	MCH; 6	BRI; 4	DAR; 34	RCH; 8	DOV; 8	MAR; 26	NWS; 8	CLT; 6	CAR; 5	ATL; 37	ONT; 6		6th	3742	
1977	Langley Racing	64	Ford											NSV; 22			RSD; 12																		6th	3742	
1978	Langley Racing	64	Ford	RSD; 15												NSV; 14	RSD; 26																		8th	3769	
1978	Donlavey Racing	90	Mercury		DAY; 5								TAL; 15						DAY; 36		POC; 7	TAL; 9	MCH; 6		DAR; 25					CLT; 10		ATL; 12	ONT; 9		8th	3769	
1978	Donlavey Racing	90	Ford			RCH; 5	CAR; 28	ATL; 6	BRI; 19	DAR; 35	NWS; 8	MAR; 27		DOV; 9	CLT; 19			MCH; 7		NSV; 8				BRI; 4		RCH; 5	DOV; 6	MAR; 13	NWS; 9		CAR; 5				8th	3769	
1979	Nelson Malloch Racing	05	Olds	RSD; 33	DAY; 27	CAR; 3	RCH; 28	ATL; 10	NWS; 13	BRI; 22	DAR; 9	MAR; 21	TAL; 37			CLT; 39	TWS	RSD		DAY; 9			TAL; 11		BRI; 20						NWS; 25				22nd	2622	
1979	Nelson Malloch Racing	05	Chevy											NSV; 27	DOV				MCH; 10		NSV; 19	POC; 20		MCH; 29		DAR; 7	RCH	DOV; 26	MAR; 15	CLT; 8		CAR; 15	ATL; 40	ONT; 7	22nd	2622	
1980	Nelson Malloch Racing	7	Chevy	RSD; 22		RCH; 29	CAR; 16	ATL; 5	BRI; 27	DAR; 5	NWS; 27	MAR; 26		NSV; 30	DOV; 17	CLT; 15	TWS; 27	RSD; 31	MCH; 33	DAY	NSV	POC	TAL	MCH	BRI										27th	1698	
1980	Nelson Malloch Racing	7	Olds		DAY; 36								TAL; 9																						27th	1698	
1980	Billy Matthews Racing	41	Chevy																							DAR; 10	RCH	DOV	NWS	MAR	CLT; 10	CAR; 31	ATL	ONT	27th	1698	
1981	Billy Matthews Racing	41	Buick	RSD	DAY; 16	RCH	CAR	ATL	BRI	NWS	DAR; 15	MAR	TAL	NSV	DOV	CLT; 36	TWS	RSD	MCH	DAY	NSV	POC	TAL	MCH	BRI	DAR	RCH	DOV	MAR	NWS	CLT				61st	-	
1981	Bobby Hawkins Racing	13	Ford																													CAR; 21	ATL; 13	RSD	61st	-	
1982	Bobby Hawkins Racing	13	Ford	DAY; 38	RCH	BRI; 28	ATL; 34	CAR	DAR; 32	NWS	MAR	TAL	NSV	DOV	CLT	POC	RSD	MCH	DAY	NSV	POC	TAL	MCH	BRI	DAR	RCH	DOV	NWS							48th	347	
1982	Steve Harrison	8	Pontiac																										CLT; 24	MAR	CAR	ATL	RSD		48th	347	
1983	Donlavey Racing	90	Ford	DAY; 5	RCH; 13	CAR; 8	ATL; 6	DAR; 19	NWS; 20	MAR; 8	TAL; 14	NSV; 25	DOV; 15	BRI; 21	CLT; 37	RSD; 5	POC; 28	MCH; 12	DAY; 32	NSV; 14	POC; 15	TAL; 7	MCH; 21	BRI; 21	DAR; 31	RCH; 13	DOV; 32	MAR; 16	NWS; 15	CLT; 37	CAR; 18	ATL; 31	RSD; 34		14th	3230	
1984	Donlavey Racing	90	Ford	DAY; 26	RCH; 19	CAR; 23*	ATL; 14	BRI; 30	NWS; 11	DAR; 31	MAR; 11	TAL; 30	NSV; 9	DOV; 35	CLT; 13	RSD; 12	POC; 20	MCH; 11	DAY; 38	NSV; 27	POC; 11	TAL; 35	MCH; 18	BRI; 3	DAR; 6	RCH; 10	DOV; 7	MAR; 11	CLT; 13	NWS; 11	CAR; 30	ATL; 17	RSD; 24		15th	3265	
1985	Petty Enterprises	1	Ford	DAY; 22	RCH	CAR; 20	ATL; 38	BRI	DAR	NWS	MAR	TAL	DOV																						53rd	249	
1985	Hendrick Motorsports	1	Chevy											CLT; 10	RSD	POC	MCH	DAY	POC	TAL	MCH	BRI	DAR	RCH	DOV	MAR	NWS	CLT	CAR	ATL	RSD				53rd	249	

===== Daytona 500 =====
Year	Team	Manufacturer	Start	Finish
1969	Brooks Racing	Plymouth	33	32
1970	Brooks Racing	Plymouth	13	19
1971	Mario Rossi	Dodge	8	7
1973	Owens Racing	Dodge	9	3
1974	Brooks Racing	Dodge	23	9
1975	Donlavey Racing	Ford	5	22
1976	Donlavey Racing	Ford	9	41
1977	Donlavey Racing	Ford	15	5
1978	Donlavey Racing	Mercury	32	5
1979	Nelson Malloch Racing	Oldsmobile	8	27
1980	Nelson Malloch Racing	Oldsmobile	41	36
1981	Billy Matthews Racing	Buick	38	16
1982	Bobby Hawkins Racing	Ford	15	38
1983	Donlavey Racing	Ford	10	5
1984	Donlavey Racing	Ford	12	26
1985	Petty Enterprises	Ford	11	22

=== 24 Hours of Le Mans results ===
24 Hours of Le Mans results
Year	Team	Co-Drivers	Car	Class	Laps	Pos.	Class Pos.
1976	(United States) Donlavey Racing	(United States) Dick Hutcherson (France) Marcel Mignot	Ford Torino	NASCAR	104	DNF	DNF
1982	(United States) Stratagraph Inc.	(United States) Hershel McGriff (United States) Tom Williams	Chevrolet Camaro	IMSA; GTO	141	NC	NC
