= 1971 Motor Trend 500 =

Auto race held at Riverside International Raceway in 1971

Race details
- Race 1 of 48 in the 1971 NASCAR Winston Cup Series season
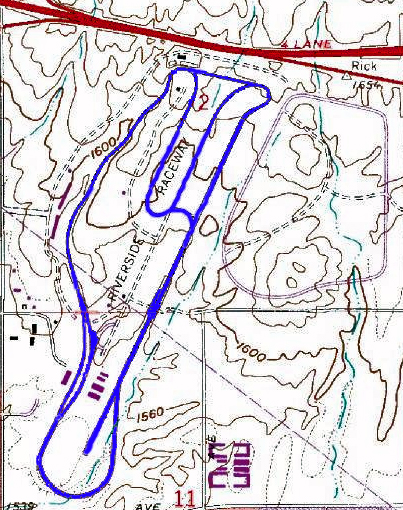
- Layout of Riverside International Raceway (1969-1988 version)
- Date: January 10, 1971
- Official name: Motor Trend 500
- Location: Riverside International Raceway, Riverside, California
- Course: Permanent racing facility
- Course length: 2.700 miles (4.345 km)
- Distance: 191 laps, 500 mi (806 km)
- Weather: Temperatures of 64 °F (18 °C); wind speeds of 8 miles per hour (13 km/h)
- Average speed: 100.783 miles per hour (162.195 km/h)
- Attendance: 23,000

Pole position
Driver	Richard Petty	Petty Enterprises

Most laps led
Driver	Ray Elder	Fred Elder
- Laps: 67

Winner
No. 96	Ray Elder	Fred Elder

Television in the United States
- Network: untelevised
- Announcers: none

The 1971 Motor Trend 500 was the first race in NASCAR's Winston Cup era (also known as the Winston Cup Grand National Series) that took place on January 10, 1971. 191 laps on a road course at Riverside International Raceway in Riverside, California that spanned a total distance of 2.620 miles (4.216 km).

Attendance was estimated at 23,000. It took four hours, fifty-seven minutes, and fifty-five seconds.

Due to a then-struggling economy, both Ford and Chevrolet cut back on factory support for the 1971 NASCAR Winston Cup Series season. NASCAR would also limit engines in the aerodynamic superspeedway cars to 305 cubic inches starting in this race.

== Race report ==
Defending NASCAR Grand National West series champion Ray Elder won the race; making it the first time that the 500-mile event at Riverside was won by a manufacturer other than Ford. The average speed was 100.783 miles per hour (162.195 km/h) while the pole speed was 107.084 miles per hour (172.335 km/h). This race was the final NASCAR Cup Series event with triple-digit numbered cars; with three of them qualifying for the race. (Pittelkow #107, Schilling #148, Collins #177). Elder became the first winner in NASCAR's "modern" history.

Only 11 cars finished this 5-hour marathon. The 8th-place finisher was 22 laps down, and the 11th-place finisher dropped out with 34 laps to go. The top prize at this race was $18,715 ($148,782 when adjusted for inflation) and the prize for finishing last (40th) was $1,015 ($8,069 when adjusted for inflation). Richard Petty competed in this race but failed to finish; he would end up in 20th after starting from the pole position. The majority of the drivers who failed to finish had an engine problem. 43-year-old Hershel McGriff entered and raced a Cup race for the first time since 1954, when he won a Grand National race at North Wilkesboro in an Oldsmobile, back when he was 26. McGriff would qualify in 8th and finish 12th.

Harry Hyde and Dale Inman were notable crew chiefs for this event; working for Richard Petty (Inman) and fourth-place finisher Bobby Isaac (Hyde).

At the end of the race, the margin between Elder and Bobby Allison was ten and a half seconds. Ray Elder would score the first of his two NASCAR cup victories here (with his second victory taking place at the 1972 Golden State 400). This race was Ron Grable's only start in the NASCAR Cup series and that G.T. Tallas finished the race with his career best of 11th place.

=== Qualifying ===
Grid	No.	Driver	Manufacturer
1	43	Richard Petty	'70 Plymouth
2	12	Bobby Allison	'70 Dodge
3	96	Ray Elder	'70 Dodge
4	71	Bobby Isaac	'71 Dodge
5	48	James Hylton	'70 Ford
6	02	Dick Bown	'70 Plymouth
7	72	Benny Parsons	'69 Ford
8	04	Hershel McGriff	'70 Plymouth
9	39	Friday Hassler	'69 Chevrolet
10	32	Kevin Terris	'70 Plymouth
11	38	Jimmy Insolo	'69 Chevrolet
12	10	Bill Champion	'69 Ford
13	24	Cecil Gordon	'69 Ford
14	44	Dick Guldstrand	'68 Chevrolet
15	08	John Soares, Jr.	'70 Plymouth
16	17	David Pearson	'70 Ford
17	19	Henley Gray	'69 Ford
18	88	Don Noel	'70 Ford
19	64	Elmo Langley	'69 Mercury
20	83	Joe Clark	'69 Chevrolet
21	99	Pat Fay	'71 Ford
22	26	Carl Joiner, Jr.	'69 Chevrolet
23	6	Jerry Oliver	'70 Oldsmobile
24	95	Bob Kauf	'69 Chevrolet
25	15	Paul Dorrity	'71 Chevrolet
26	82	Ron Gautsche	'69 Ford
27	4	Dick Kranzler	'70 Chevrolet
28	07	Ivan Baldwin	'69 Chevrolet
29	23	G.T. Tallas	'69 Ford
30	00	Frank James	'69 Chevrolet
31	7	Jack McCoy	'70 Dodge
32	77	Ray Johnstone	'69 Plymouth
33	5	Ron Grable	'70 Ford
34	70	J.D. McDuffie	'69 Mercury
35	148	Harry Schilling	'69 Dodge
36	177	Roy Collins	'69 Dodge
37	79	Frank Warren	'69 Plymouth
38	108	Mike Pittelkow	'69 Chevrolet
39	33	Glenn Francis	'70 Chevrolet
40	18	Bob England	'70 Chevrolet

== Finishing order ==
1. Ray Elder
2. Bobby Allison
3. Benny Parsons
4. Bobby Isaac
5. James Hylton
6. Friday Hassler
7. Kevin Terris
8. Carl Joiner
9. Henley Gray
10. Cecil Gordon
11. G.T. Tallas
12. Hershel McGriff
13. Bob England
14. Dick Kranzler
15. J.D. McDuffie
16. Dick Bown
17. Elmo Langley
18. Jack McCoy
19. Ron Gautsche
20. Richard Petty
21. John Soares, Jr.
22. Frank James
23. Ron Grable
24. Dick Guldstrand
25. Jimmy Insolo
26. Bill Champion
27. Bob Kauf
28. Paul Dorrity
29. Jerry Oliver
30. Frank Warren
31. Mike Pittelkow
32. Ray Johnstone
33. Don Noel
34. Glenn Francis
35. David Pearson
36. Joe Clark
37. Harry Schilling
38. Roy Collins
39. Ivan Baldwin
40. Pat Fay

== Timeline ==
Section reference:

- Start of race: Richard Petty had the lead position as the green flag was waved.
- Lap 4: Bobby Allison took over the lead from Richard Petty.
- Lap 5: David Pearson took over the lead from Bobby Allison.
- Lap 21: Joe Clark retired with transmission issues.
- Lap 25: Richard Petty took over the lead from David Pearson.
- Lap 36: Ray Johnstone had a race ending crash.
- Lap 38: Clutch problems ended Mike Pittelkow's day on the track.
- Lap 40: Frank Warren retired due to transmission issues.
- Lap 56: Bob Kauf retired from the race due to transmission issues.
- Lap 58: Bill Champion retired with transmission issues.
- Lap 76: Dick Guldstrand retired due to a frame problems.
- Lap 84: Ray Elder took over the lead from Richard Petty.
- Lap 97: Frank James retired due to transmission problems.
- Lap 107: Bobby Allison took over the lead from Ray Elder.
- Lap 118: A faulty lug bolt ended Ron Gaustche's race.
- Lap 120: Ray Elder took over the lead from Bobby Allison.
- Lap 133: Steering issues brought Dick Bown's day on the track to a premature halt.
- Lap 136: Bobby Allison took over the lead from Ray Elder.
- Lap 150: Ray Elder took over the lead from Bobby Allison.
- Lap 155: Bob England managed to render his vehicle's engine non-functional.
- Lap 156: Hershel McGriff retired due to ignition trouble.
- Lap 157: G.T. Tallas retired due to engine trouble.
- Lap 166: Bobby Allison took over the lead from Ray Elder.
- Lap 180: Ray Elder took over the lead from Bobby Allison.
- Finish: Ray Elder was officially declared the winner of the event.

Preceded by 1970 Tidewater 300	NASCAR Grand National/Winston Cup Races; 1970-71	Succeeded by 1971 Daytona 500
Preceded by 1970 Motor Trend 500	Motor Trend 500 races 1964-71	Succeeded by becomes the Winston Western 500
