= 1985 Coca-Cola World 600 =

Auto race held at Charlotte Motor Speedway in 1985

Race details
- Race 11 of 28 in the 1985 NASCAR Winston Cup Series
- Date: May 26, 1985
- Location: Charlotte Motor Speedway, Concord, North Carolina
- Course: Permanent racing facility
- Course length: 1.5 miles (2.4 km)
- Distance: 400 laps, 600 mi (965.606 km)
- Weather: Temperatures of 68.4 °F (20.2 °C); wind speeds of 10.2 miles per hour (16.4 km/h)
- Average speed: 129.326 mph (208.130 km/h)

Pole position
Driver	Bill Elliott	Melling Racing

Most laps led
Driver	Dale Earnhardt	Richard Childress Racing
- Laps: 97

Winner
No. 11	Darrell Waltrip	Junior Johnson & Associates

Television in the United States
- Network: Jefferson-Pilot
- Announcers: Mike Joy & Johnny Hayes

The 1985 Coca-Cola World 600, the 26th running of the event, was a NASCAR Winston Cup Series race held on May 26, 1985 at Charlotte Motor Speedway in Charlotte, North Carolina. Contested over 400 laps on the 1.5 mile (2.4 km) speedway, it was the 11th race of the 1985 NASCAR Winston Cup Series season. Darrell Waltrip of Junior Johnson & Associates won the race.

This race was Michael Waltrip's Winston Cup debut. Dick Brooks would retire from NASCAR after the conclusion of this event. Terry Labonte's fifth-place finish would be sufficient for him to take away the championship points lead from Bill Elliott.

This was the third of four designated races that made up the first Winston Million promotion. Bill Elliott, winner of the first two Winston Million races at Daytona and Talladega and the sensation of the 1985 NASCAR Winston Cup season, brought much media attention to the race in his bid to win the $1,000,000 bonus. Instead, Darrell Waltrip drove to a dominating win. Elliott would win the bonus at race 4, the 1985 Southern 500.

== Background ==
Charlotte Motor Speedway is a motorsports complex located in Concord, North Carolina, United States 13 miles from Charlotte, North Carolina. The complex features a 1.5 miles (2.4 km) quad oval track that hosts NASCAR racing including the prestigious Coca-Cola World 600 on Memorial Day weekend and The Winston, as well as the Miller High Life 500. The speedway was built in 1959 by Bruton Smith and is considered the home track for NASCAR with many race teams located in the Charlotte area. The track is owned and operated by Speedway Motorsports Inc. (SMI).

== Top ten results ==
Pos	No.	Driver	Team	Manufacturer	Laps
1	11	Darrell Waltrip	Junior Johnson & Associates	Chevrolet	91
2	33	Harry Gant	Mach 1 Racing	Chevrolet	82
3	22	Bobby Allison	DiGard Motorsports	Buick	15
4	3	Dale Earnhardt	Richard Childress Racing	Chevrolet	97
5	44	Terry Labonte	Hagan Racing	Oldsmobile	0
6	75	Lake Speed	RahMoc Enterprises	Pontiac	0
7	4	Joe Ruttman	Morgan-McClure Motorsports	Chevrolet	0
8	2	Rusty Wallace	Cliff Stewart Racing	Pontiac	0
9	27	Tim Richmond	Blue Max Racing	Pontiac	1
10	1	Dick Brooks	Hendrick Motorsports	Chevrolet	0

== Race statistics ==
- Time of race: 4:13:52
- Average Speed: 141.807 miles per hour (228.216 km/h)
- Pole Speed: 164.703 miles per hour (265.064 km/h)
- Cautions: 7 for 34 laps
- Margin of Victory: 14.64 seconds
- Lead changes: 29
