= Dick Kranzler =

American racing driver (born 1938)

- Born: November 26, 1938 (age 87); Santa Susana, California, U.S.
- Awards: 1971 NASCAR Winston West Series Rookie of the Year

NASCAR Cup Series career
- 9 races run over 5 years
- Best finish: 68th (1972)
- First race: 1970 Motor Trend 500 (Riverside)
- Last race: 1979 NAPA Riverside 400 (Riverside)
Wins	Top tens	Poles
0	0	0

ARCA Menards Series West career
- 94 races run over 8 years
- Best finish: 6th (1971)
- First race: 1970 Motor Trend 500 (Riverside)
- Last race: 1980 Datsun 200 (Ontario)
Wins	Top tens	Poles
0	24	0
- Statistics up to date as of June 2, 2026.

Dick Kranzler (born November 26, 1938) is an American former professional stock car racing driver. He primarily competed in the NASCAR Winston West Series, where he was the first driver to be awarded rookie of the year in 1971.

== Racing career ==
Kranzler began competing in NASCAR in 1970, making his Grand National and Grand National West debuts simultaneously in the 1970 Motor Trend 500 at Riverside International Raceway, finishing eighteenth. He made one other West start, finishing twenty-third at Saugus Speedway. Kranzler ran a majority of the schedule in the renamed WInston West Series in 1971, attempting twenty-four of twenty-six races. He failed to qualify for a race at Orange Show Speedway, but would make a total of twenty-three starts, scoring nine top-ten finishes, including a third-place result at Stockton 99 Speedway. He finished sixth in the final standings and was awarded rookie of the year, the first driver to be given this award in the series. His West schedule included three races in the renamed Winston Cup Series, where he scored a best result of fourteenth in the season opener at Riverside. Kranzler competed in all but one West race in 1972, scoring seven top-ten finishes, including his third and final career top-five. This schedule included three Winston Cup races, where he scored a best finish of sixteenth; he also attempted to qualify for the 1972 Daytona 500, but did not make the field. Kranzler would again run a majority of the Winston West schedule in 1973, scoring four top-tens across nineteen starts. There were no combination races during this season, however he would still compete in one Winston Cup race at Riverside, where he finished twenty-fifth. Kranzler only ran thirteen of twenty-eight West Series races in 1974, scoring two top-tens. He only competed in three races in 1975, scoring a best finish of seventeenth at Evergreen Speedway. He did not compete in NASCAR in 1976 and 1977. In 1978, he attempted to qualify for races at Riverside and Ontario Motor Speedway, but did not make the field for either event. He competed in four West races in 1979, scoring the final two top-ten finishes of his career. He also made his final Winston Cup start, finishing twenty-ninth at Riverside, and failed to qualify at Ontario. He also made his only career USAC Stock Car Series start on Ontario, starting and finishing twenty-ninth due to rear end issues. Kranzler made his final Winston West Series start in 1980, finishing sixteenth at Ontario. He made his final attempt in the Winston Cup Series at Ontario, failing to qualify.
