= Langley Speedway (British Columbia) =

Auto racing track in Langley, British Columbia, Canada

Coordinates: 49.018873°N 122.648686°W

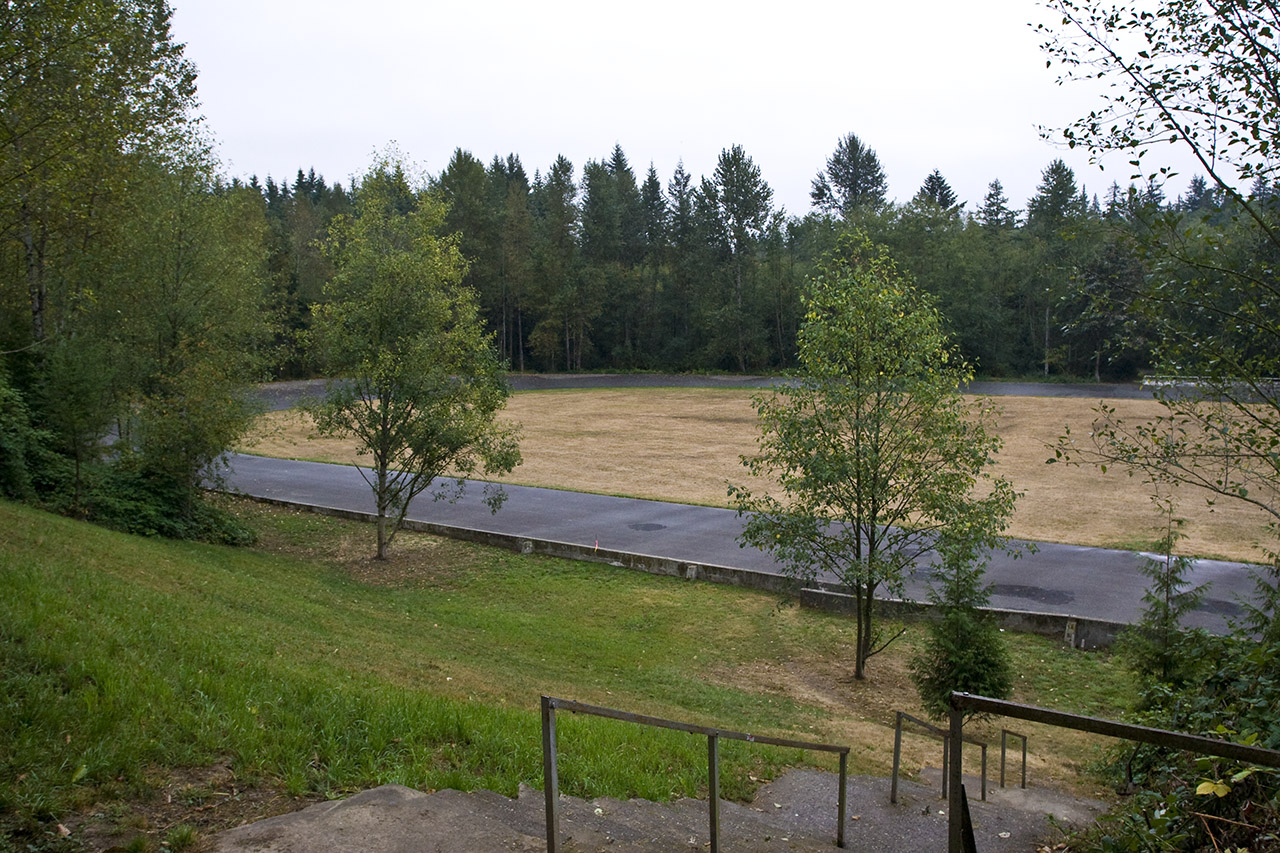
- Location: Langley, British Columbia
- Opened: 1963
- Closed: 1984
- Former names: Action Raceway
- Major events: NASCAR Winston West

Short Oval
- Length: 0.4 km (0.25 mi)

Langley Speedway was a 1/4-mile paved oval track used for stock car racing located in Langley, British Columbia. The track opened on June 13, 1965 (there are conflicting references on the track length), and closed in 1984. The track hosted numerous classes of racing during its operational existence, including several visits from the NASCAR Winston West series in the 1970s. For the last few years prior to its closing due to its lease not being renewed, the track was known as Action Raceway.

== History ==
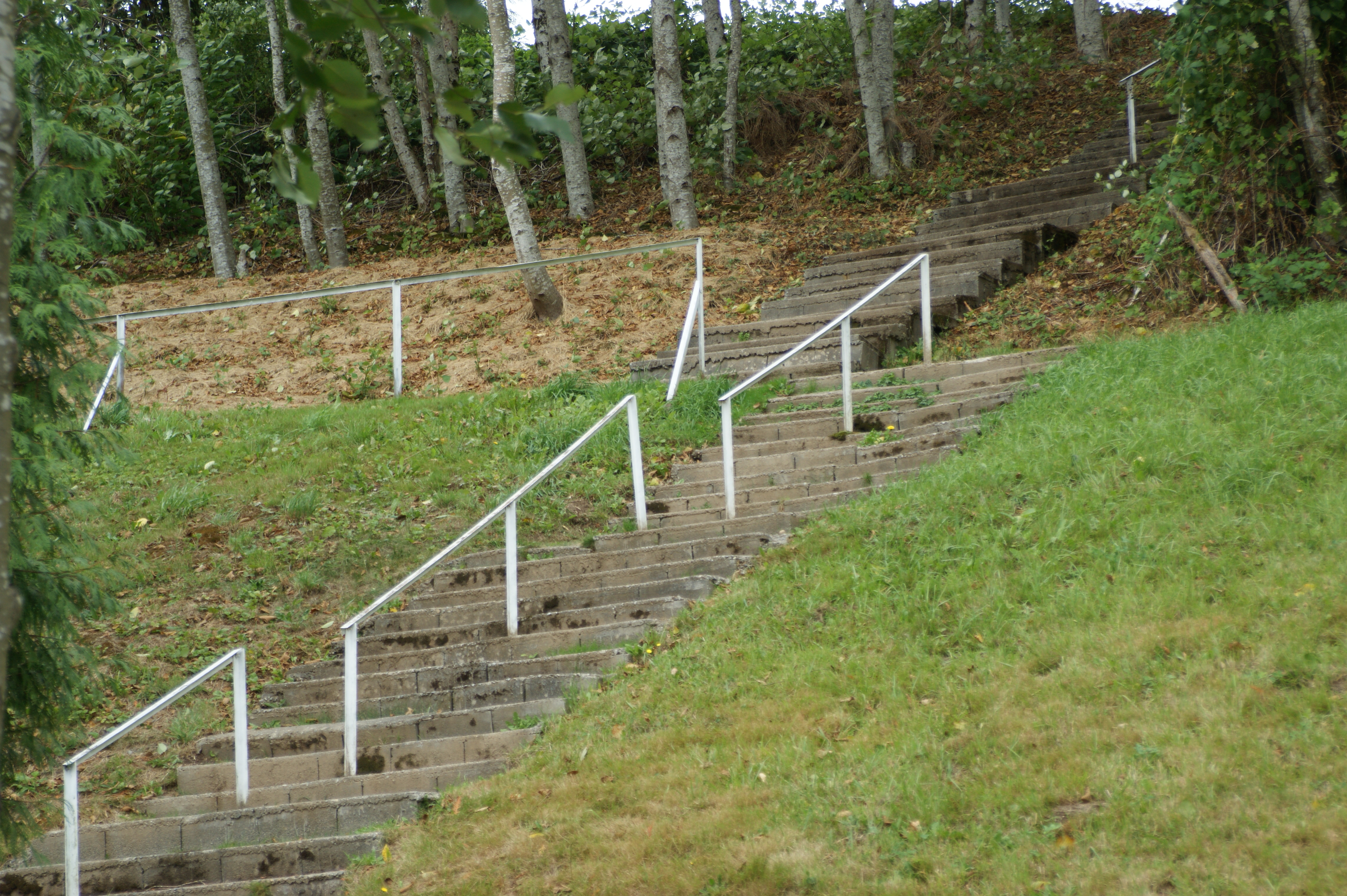
Stairs from the former grandstands on the North side of the speedway

Langley Speedway was founded by Craig Frazier in 1963, and was included in a 1969 purchase of land by the Vancouver-Fraser Park District, which later became a part of the Greater Vancouver Regional District, for use as a park. Frazier sold the land and signed a ten-year lease, operating the track until it was taken over by Gordon Hemrich in 1977. After the ten-year lease expired in 1979, renewals were year-to-year, and increasing pressure was brought by local governments with regards to number of events and other issues. Eventually, in 1984, after its operations were taken over by the Lower Mainland Oval Racing Association, the track was closed. Today, it is part of Campbell Valley Regional Park.

The Langley Speedway Historical Society (LSHS) has lobbied governments in the area to preserve the facility, holding clean-up events at and around the track. In 2006, the GVRD Parks Committee voted unanimously to support heritage listing of the speedway. The GVRD Board also voted unanimously to support the listing. In September 2006, the Council of the Township of Langley voted unanimously to include Langley Speedway on its Heritage Resource Listing. The LSHS is currently working with the GVRD staff and other interested groups in its efforts to preserve the site and promote it for various event uses, including car shows.

== Racing ==
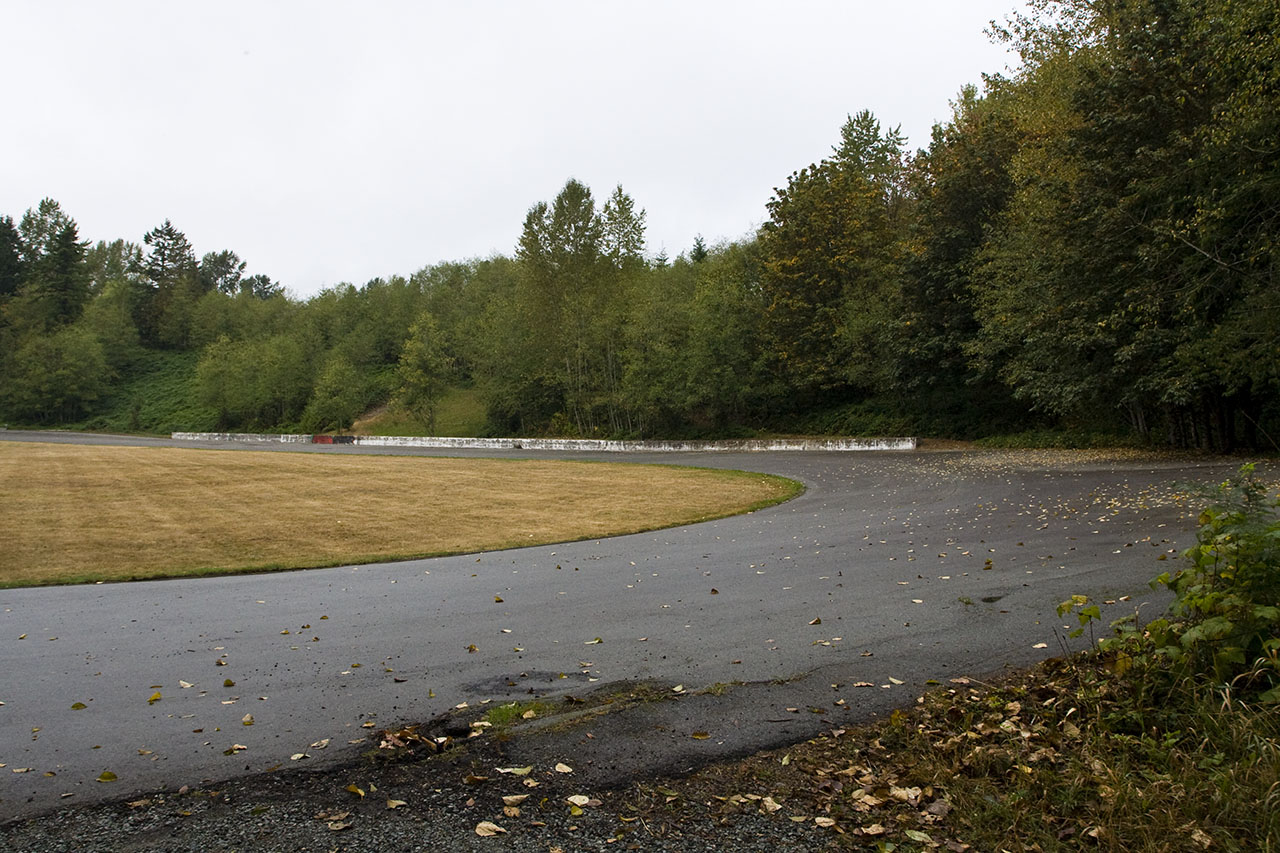
Langley Speedway in 2007

According to the Langley Speedway Historical Society, Langley Speedway is one of only three locations in British Columbia that has hosted NASCAR events over the years. Winston West races took place in 1971, 1972, 1978 and 1981; Hershel McGriff was a winner of 150-mile races in 1971 and 1972. NASCAR late-model Sportsman races also took place at the track, and the Canadian American Modified Racing Association also used the facility.

== Notable racers ==
Many notable drivers raced at Langley Speedway over the years, including:

- Ray Elder
- Hershel McGriff
- Earl Ross
- Roy Smith
- Tom Sneva
- Doug Rutz
