= 1970 Motor Trend 500 =

Auto race held at Riverside International Raceway in 1970

Race details
- Race 1 of 48 in the 1970 NASCAR Grand National Series season
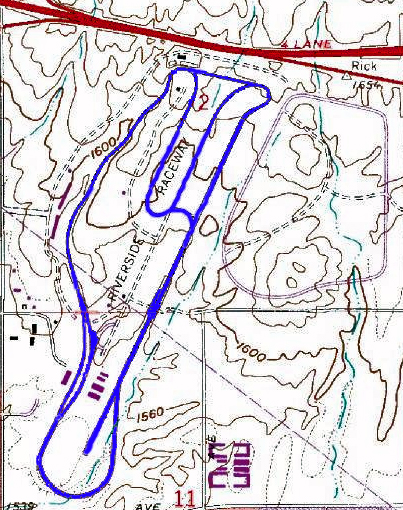
- Layout of Riverside International Raceway (1969-1988 version)
- Date: January 18, 1970
- Official name: Motor Trend 500
- Location: Riverside International Raceway, Riverside, California
- Course: Permanent racing facility
- Course length: 2.700 miles (4.345 km)
- Distance: 191 laps, 502 mi (808 km)
- Weather: Temperatures of 68.9 °F (20.5 °C); wind speeds of18.1 miles per hour (29.1 km/h)
- Average speed: 97.450 miles per hour (156.831 km/h)

Pole position
Driver	Dan Gurney	Petty Enterprises

Most laps led
Driver	Parnelli Jones	Wood Brothers Racing
- Laps: 88

Winner
No. 11	A. J. Foyt	Jack Bowsher & Associates

Television in the United States
- Network: Untelevised
- Announcers: None

The 1970 Motor Trend 500 was a NASCAR Grand National Series event that was held on January 18, 1970, at Riverside International Raceway in Riverside, California.

== Race report ==
The Plymouth Superbird would make its first NASCAR appearance during this race. Six cautions slowed the race for 31 laps. A. J. Foyt was the winner in his 1970 Ford Torino; defeating Roger McCluskey by 3½ seconds. Parnelli Jones won the pole position but had to start far down in the field because NASCAR ruled that the Firestone tires that Jones and nine West Coast drivers used in qualifying were "ineligible" as there were not enough of that particular compound available to other racers. Other drivers affected by this ruling included Ray Elder, who had qualified 9th; Jack McCoy, who qualified 13th; 1969 NASCAR PCLM champion Scotty Cain, and Dick Bown. After switching tires, the ten drivers were allowed to start behind other qualifiers in order of their qualifying speed. After nearly pulling out of the race in dispute, Jones started in 35th position and charged through the field. He gained 18 positions on the first lap. He took the lead on lap 80 and almost lapped the entire field until his clutch broke on lap 160; giving him an 11th-place finish. Out of A.J. Foyt's seven Cup wins this was his only one that came on a road course. All of his other victories were on super speedways.

USAC Stock Car champion McCluskey crossed over for his only NASCAR race of the 1970 season and raced his Superbird complete with popular Looney Tunes character the Road Runner painted on the door, and finished second. This was his only NASCAR top-five finish.

There were forty-four competitors in this race; 43 were from the United States of America while (Lothar Motschenbacher) was from Cologne, West Germany. Veteran West Coast racer Jim Cook suffered a career ending accident, when his car collided with the end of the turn 9 crashwall on lap 94. His injuries would leave him in a wheelchair. The other finishers in the top ten were: LeeRoy Yarbrough, Donnie Allison, Richard Petty, Dan Gurney (who had become a mainstay at the track during the 1960s and would leave NASCAR after this year), Neil Castles, Friday Hassler, Jerry Oliver, and Dick Guldstrand. Motschenbacher would start in 31st place and finish the race in 40th. Sam Posey's lone NASCAR start ended spectacularly when the #6 Dodge's engine failed and caused a fire.

The average speed of the race was 97.045 miles per hour (156.179 km/h) while Dan Gurney earned the pole position with a qualifying speed of 112.006 miles per hour (180.256 km/h). There were 43,200 fans to see 193 laps of action on the road course. This was the last start in NASCAR's top series (then known as Grand National) for Southern California short track racer Frank Deiny. He would finish in 41st place due to wheel bearing issues on lap 4. However, this event included yellow flags. Famous crew chiefs participating in this race included Banjo Matthews, Dale Inman, Jerry Hyde and Dick Hutcherson.

The winner's purse was $19,700 ($163,323 when adjusted for inflation) while the last-place finisher went home with $800 ($6,632 when adjusted for inflation). The total amount of money offered was $84,235 ($699,095 when adjusted for inflation).

=== Qualifying ===
Grid	No.	Driver	Manufacturer	Owner
1	42	Dan Gurney	'70 Plymouth	Petty Enterprises
2	17	David Pearson	'70 Ford	Holman-Moody
3	11	A.J. Foyt	'70 Ford	Jack Bowsher
4	22	Bobby Allison	'69 Dodge	Mario Rossi
5	98	LeeRoy Yarbrough	'70 Ford	Junior Johnson
6	43	Richard Petty	'70 Plymouth	Petty Enterprises
7	71	Bobby Isaac	'69 Dodge	Nord Krauskopf
8	27	Donnie Allison	'70 Ford	Banjo Matthews
9	6	Sam Posey	'69 Dodge	Cotton Owens
10	48	James Hylton	'69 Dodge	James Hylton

== Finishing order ==
Section reference:

1. #11 - A.J. Foyt
2. #1 - Roger McCluskey
3. #98 - LeeRoy Yarbrough
4. #27 - Donnie Allison
5. #43 - Richard Petty
6. #42 - Dan Gurney
7. #06 - Neil Castles
8. #39 - Friday Hassler
9. #116 - Jerry Oliver
10. #83 - Dick Guldstrand
11. #21 - Parnelli Jones
12. #321 - Kevin Terris
13. #22 - Bobby Allison
14. #30 - Dave Marcis
15. #09 - Sam Rose
16. #81 - Dave Alonzo
17. #17 - David Pearson
18. #4 - Dick Kranzler
19. #15 - Paul Dorrity
20. #132 - Joe Frasson
21. #00 - Frank James
22. #61 - Dick Bown
23. #179 - Ranny Dodd
24. #96 - Ray Elder
25. #38 - Jimmy Insolo
26. #18 - Jim Cook
27. #16 - Steve Froines
28. #6 - Sam Posey
29. #71 - Bobby Isaac
30. #7 - Jack McCoy
31. #23 - G. T. Tallas
32. #40 - Les Loeser Jr.
33. #32 - Dick Brooks
34. #31 - Buddy Young
35. #48 - James Hylton
36. #64 - Elmo Langley
37. #126 - Carl Joiner
38. #88 - Don Noel
39. #93 - Don White
40. #144 - Lothar Motschenbacher
41. #05 - Frank Deiny
42. #45 - Scotty Cain
43. #80 - Bob England
44. #79 - Frank Warren

== Timeline ==
Section reference:

- Start: David Pearson's vehicle was the first to leave the start/finish line as the green flag was waved in the air.
- Lap 26: A.J. Foyt took over the lead from David Pearson.
- Lap 27: Richard Petty took over the lead from A.J. Foyt.
- Lap 29: David Pearson took over the lead from Richard Petty.
- Lap 35: LeeRoy Yarbrough took over the lead from David Pearson.
- Lap 36: A.J. Foyt took over the lead from LeeRoy Yarbrough.
- Lap 43: Parnelli Jones took over the lead from A.J. Foyt.
- Lap 44: LeeRoy Yarbrough took over the lead from Parnelli Jones.
- Lap 45: Donnie Allison took over the lead from LeeRoy Yarbrough.
- Lap 65: A.J. Foyt took over the lead from Donnie Allison.
- Lap 67: Parnelli Jones took over the lead from A.J. Foyt.
- Lap 85: Donnie Allison took over the lead from Parnelli Jones.
- Lap 87: David Pearson took over the lead from Donnie Allison.
- Lap 95: LeeRoy Yarbrough took over the leaf from David Pearson.
- Lap 96: Roger McCluskey took over the lead from LeeRoy Yarbrough.
- Lap 98: LeeRoy Yarbrough took over the lead from Roger McCluskey.
- Lap 99: Parnelli Jones took over the lead from LeeRoy Yarbrough.
- Lap 110: LeeRoy Yarbrough took over the lead from Parnelli Jones.
- Lap 111: Parnelli Jones took over the lead from LeeRoy Yarbrough.
- Lap 137: The rear end of Frank James' vehicle was forcibly removed in an unsafe manner.
- Lap 143: Paul Dority's engine suddenly acted in a strange manner.
- Lap 148: David Pearson's vehicle developed transmission issues that sidelined him.
- Lap 163: Dave Marcis had a terminal crash.
- Lap 164: The bell housing on Bobby Allison's vehicle was acting strangely.
- Lap 168: Parnelli Jones's vehicle suffered from a problematic clutch.
- Lap 169: A.J. Foyt took over the lead from Parnelli Jones.
- Lap 186: Richard Petty's engine stopped working properly.
- Finish: A.J. Foyt was officially declared the winner of the event.

Preceded by 1969 Motor Trend 500	Motor Trend 500 races 1964-71	Succeeded by 1971 Motor Trend 500

Preceded by 1969 Texas 500	NASCAR Grand National Series Season; 1969	Succeeded by 1970 Daytona 500
