= 1969 Daytona 500 =

Auto race held at Daytona International Speedway in 1969

Race details
- Race 6 of 54 in the 1969 NASCAR Grand National Series season
- 1969 Daytona 500 program cover
- Date: February 23, 1969
- Location: Daytona International Speedway; Daytona Beach, Florida, U.S.
- Course: Permanent racing facility 2.5 mi (4.023 km)
- Distance: 200 laps, 500 mi (804.672 km)
- Weather: Mild with temperatures of 73 °F (23 °C); wind speeds of 12 miles per hour (19 km/h)
- Average speed: 157.95 mph (254.20 km/h)

Pole position
Driver	Buddy Baker	Ray Fox

Most laps led
Driver	Donnie Allison	Banjo Matthews
- Laps: 87

Winner
No. 98	LeeRoy Yarbrough	Junior Johnson

The 1969 Daytona 500 was a NASCAR Grand National Series race held on February 23, 1969, at Daytona International Speedway in Daytona Beach, Florida.

== Race report ==
LeeRoy Yarbrough chased down Charlie Glotzbach, who had an 11-second lead, and passed him on the final lap after starting 19th. It was the first Daytona 500 won on a last lap pass. Yarbrough won in a back-up Ford car after crashing his primary one.

Using a grid of 51 competitors (commonplace during the 1950s and 1960s), the average speed of the race was 157.95 mph (254.20 km/h).

First Daytona 500 starts for Benny Parsons, Ray Elder, Vic Elford, Richard Brickhouse, Cecil Gordon, Dick Brooks, Ben Arnold, J. D. McDuffie, and Pete Hamilton. Only Daytona 500 start for George Bauer, E. J. Trivette, Swede Savage, Bobby Unser, Bill Kimmel, Billy Taylor, and Dick Poling. Last Daytona 500 starts for Andy Hampton, Dub Simpson, Wayne Smith, Earl Brooks, Dick Johnson, Bobby Johns, Paul Goldsmith, and H. B. Bailey.

== Race results ==
Pos	Grid	No.	Driver	Entrant	Manufacturer	Laps	Winnings	Laps led	Time/Status
1	19	98	LeeRoy Yarbrough	Junior Johnson & Associates	1969 Ford	200	$38,950	18	3:09:56
2	4	6	Charlie Glotzbach	Cotton Owens	1969 Dodge	200	$18,425	51	+1 car length
3	7	27	Donnie Allison	Banjo Matthews	1969 Ford	199	$13,275	87	+1 Lap
4	9	11	A. J. Foyt	Jack Bowsher	1969 Ford	199	$5,800	1	+1 Lap
5	1	3	Buddy Baker	Ray Fox	1969 Dodge	198	$10,050	23	+2 Laps
6	3	17	David Pearson	Holman-Moody	1969 Ford	198	$5,600	0	+2 Laps
7	11	88	Benny Parsons	Russ Dawson	1969 Ford	197	$2,450	0	+3 Laps
8	12	43	Richard Petty	Petty Enterprises	1969 Ford	196	$3,150	0	+4 Laps
9	51	58	Andy Hampton	Ranier Racing	1969 Dodge	191	$2,500	0	+9 Laps
10	16	96	Ray Elder	Fred Elder	1969 Dodge	190	$2,935	0	+10 Laps
11	23	8	Vic Elford	Ranier Racing	1969 Dodge	188	$2,650	0	+12 Laps
12	21	03	Richard Brickhouse	Dub Clewis	1967 Plymouth	188	$3,560	0	+12 Laps
13	31	39	Friday Hassler	Friday Hassler	1967 Chevrolet	187	$3,460	0	+13 Laps
14	14	25	Jabe Thomas	Don Robertson	1968 Plymouth	187	$2,495	0	+13 Laps
15	15	48	James Hylton	James Hylton	1968 Dodge	185	$2,445	2	+15 Laps
16	20	06	Neil Castles	Neil Castles	1969 Plymouth	185	$2,385	0	+15 Laps
17	45	30	Dave Marcis	Milt Lunda	1967 Chevrolet	181	$2,260	0	+19 Laps
18	22	45	Bill Seifert	Bill Seifert	1968 Ford	179	$2,335	0	+21 Laps
19	50	80	Frank Warren	E. C. Reid	1967 Chevrolet	178	$2,245	0	+22 Laps
20	29	64	Elmo Langley	Elmo Langley	1968 Ford	178	$2,285	0	+22 Laps
21	44	75	George Bauer	Robert Schultz	1967 Dodge	176	$2,205	0	+24 Laps
22	26	44	Dub Simpson	Richard Giachetti	1967 Chevrolet	176	$1,420	0	+24 Laps
23	30	10	Bill Champion	Bill Champion	1968 Ford	176	$1,395	0	+24 Laps
24	39	19	Henley Gray	Harry Melton	1968 Ford	173	$1,355	0	+27 Laps
25	48	0	Don Tarr	Don Tarr	1967 Chevrolet	172	$1,345	0	+28 Laps
26	38	08	E. J. Trivette	E. C. Reid	1969 Chevrolet	171	$1,345	0	+29 Laps
27	34	47	Cecil Gordon	Bill Seifert	1968 Ford	171	$1,360	0	+29 Laps
28	13	67	Buddy Arrington	Buddy Arrington	1969 Dodge	170	$1,610	0	Engine
29	49	34	Wendell Scott	Wendell Scott	1968 Ford	168	$1,105	0	+32 Laps
30	2	71	Bobby Isaac	Nord Krauskopf	1969 Dodge	150	$3,400	0	Crash
31	32	33	Wayne Smith	Archie Smith	1969 Chevrolet	148	$1,350	0	+52 Laps
32	33	32	Dick Brooks	Dick Brooks	1969 Plymouth	140	$1,345	0	Engine
33	18	29	Ramo Stott	Ramo Stott	1967 Plymouth	139	$1,410	0	Engine
34	24	76	Ben Arnold	Don Culpepper	1968 Ford	133	$1,370	0	Engine
35	40	26	Earl Brooks	Earl Brooks	1967 Ford	130	$1,275	0	Overheating
36	10	41	Swede Savage	Wood Brothers Racing	1968 Mercury	123	$2,520	0	Crash
37	27	18	Dick Johnson	Dick Johnson	1968 Ford	104	$1,345	0	Oil leak
38	5	21	Cale Yarborough	Wood Brothers Racing	1969 Ford	103	$2,560	17	Crash
39	36	70	J. D. McDuffie	J. D. McDuffie	1967 Buick	87	$2,290	0	Engine
40	43	7	Bobby Johns	Shorty Johns	1967 Chevrolet	67	$1,205	0	Overheating
41	6	99	Paul Goldsmith	Ray Nichels	1969 Dodge	62	$1,600	0	Crash
42	8	13	Bobby Unser	Smokey Yunick	1969 Ford	56	$1,400	1	Crash
43	41	22	Bobby Allison	Mario Rossi	1969 Dodge	45	$1,160	0	Engine
44	17	1	Pete Hamilton	A. J. King	1969 Dodge	44	1,885	0	Crash
45	42	4	John Sears	L. G. DeWitt	1967 Ford	41	$965	0	Overheating
46	46	69	Bill Kimmel	Carl Manis	1969 Chevrolet	30	$900	0	Engine
47	25	36	H. B. Bailey	H. B. Bailey	1969 Pontiac	24	$1,940	0	Engine
48	28	53	Billy Taylor	Carl Miller	1967 Plymouth	20	$870	0	Engine
49	47	82	Dick Poling	Mack Sellers	1967 Chevrolet	19	$760	0	Engine
50	37	57	Roy Mayne	Ervin Pruitt	1967 Dodge	9	$725	0	Engine
51	35	23	Don Biederman	Dennis Holt	1967 Ford	0	–	0	Did not start

== Timeline ==
Section reference:

- Start of race: Buddy Baker had the pole position, so he led the other cars into the start of lap 1.
- Lap 4: Cale Yarborough took over the lead from Buddy Baker before losing it to Buddy Baker on lap 21.
- Lap 9: Roy Mayne had engine problems in his vehicle so he wasn't able to finish the race.
- Lap 19: Dick Poling's vehicle suddenly had engine problems that knocked him out of the event.
- Lap 20: Billy Taylor would finish in an abysmal 48th place due to a faulty engine.
- Lap 21: Buddy Baker took over the lead from Cale Yarborough.
- Lap 24: H. B. Bailey would see his day on the track cut short due to engine issues.
- Lap 30: Bill Kimmel would be put on the sidelines due to engine problems with his vehicle.
- Lap 34: Donnie Allison took over the lead from Buddy Baker before losing it to Buddy Baker on lap 46.
- Lap 41: Johnny Sears managed to overheat his vehicle.
- Lap 44: Pete Hamilton had a terminal crash, forcing him out of the race prematurely.
- Lap 45: Bobby Allison's vehicle developed a faulty engine which caused him to finish in a despicable 43rd place.
- Lap 47: Bobby Unser took over the lead from Buddy Baker before losing it back to Buddy Baker on lap 48.
- Lap 56: A. J. Foyt took over the lead from Buddy Baker; Bobby Unser had a terminal crash while racing at high speeds.
- Lap 57: Donnie Allison took over the lead from A. J. Foyt, ultimately losing it to Charlie Glotzbach on lap 119.
- Lap 62: Paul Goldsmith had a terminal crash, forcing him to be sidelined for the remainder of the event.
- Lap 67: Bobby Johns managed to overheat his vehicle.
- Lap 87: J. D. McDuffie fell out with engine failure while racing at competitive speeds.
- Lap 103: Cale Yarborough had a terminal crash, forcing him to accept a miserable 38th place.
- Lap 104: Dick Johnson had an oil leak in his vehicle, rendering his vehicle unsafe to drive in.
- Lap 119: Charlie Glotzbach took over the lead from Donnie Allison.
- Lap 123: Swede Savage had a terminal crash that would knock him out of the race.
- Lap 130: Earl Brooks managed to overheat his vehicle from the trials and tribulations of high-speed driving.
- Lap 133: Ben Arnold's engine could not take any more racing and developed problems.
- Lap 139: Donnie Allison took over the lead from Charlie Glotzbach.
- Lap 140: Dick Brooks' engine had seen better moments of the race and stopped working completely.
- Lap 146: Charlie Glotzback took over the lead from Donnie Allison.
- Lap 150: Bobby Isaac had a terminal crash.
- Lap 153: Ben Arnold's vehicle would release a dangerous amount of debris, ending full-speed racing until lap 157.
- Lap 155: Donnie Allison took over the lead from Charlie Glotzbach.
- Lap 161: LeeRoy Yarbrough took over the lead from Donnie Allison.
- Lap 170: Buddy Harrington fell out with engine failure.
- Lap 178: Charlie Glotzbach took over the lead from LeeRoy Yarbrough.
- Lap 200: LeeRoy Yarbrough took over the lead from Charlie Glotzbach.
- Finish: LeeRoy Yarbrough was officially declared the winner of the event.

Preceded by 1969 Motor Trend 500	NASCAR Grand National Series Season; 1969	Succeeded by 1969 Carolina 500
