= 1969 Dixie 500 =

Auto race held at Atlanta International Raceway in 1969

Race details
- Race 36 of 54 in the 1969 NASCAR Grand National Series season
- Layout of Atlanta International Speedway, used until 1996
- Date: August 10, 1969
- Official name: Dixie 500
- Location: Atlanta International Raceway, Hampton, Georgia
- Course: Permanent racing facility
- Course length: 1.522 miles (2.449 km)
- Distance: 328 laps, 499.2 mi (803.3 km)
- Weather: Very hot with temperatures of 86 °F (30 °C); wind speeds of 10.1 miles per hour (16.3 km/h)
- Average speed: 133.001 mph (214.044 km/h)
- Attendance: 14,300

Pole position
Driver	Cale Yarborough	Wood Brothers Racing

Most laps led
Driver	LeeRoy Yarbrough	Junior Johnson & Associates
- Laps: 142

Winner
No. 98	LeeRoy Yarbrough	Junior Johnson & Associates

Television in the United States
- Network: untelevised
- Announcers: none

The 1969 Dixie 500 was a NASCAR Grand National Series event that was held on August 10, 1969, at Atlanta International Raceway in Hampton, Georgia.

== Background ==
Atlanta International Raceway (now Atlanta Motor Speedway) is one of ten current intermediate tracks to hold NASCAR races. The layout at Atlanta International Speedway at the time was a four-turn traditional oval track that is 1.54 miles (2.48 km) long. The track's turns are banked at twenty-four degrees, while the front stretch, the location of the finish line, and the back stretch are banked at five. The race was scheduled for August 3, 1969, but it ended up being rain delayed until August 10, 1969.

== Race report ==
After 334 laps (3¾ hours of racing), LeeRoy Yarbrough defeated David Pearson by 5½ seconds in front of 14,300 people. The pole position winner was Cale Yarborough at 155.413 miles per hour (250.113 km/h). John Sears had a problem with his engine and had to withdraw from the race on the third lap. Nord Krauskopf's entry (with Bobby Isaac as the driver) finished in 34th place.

Ford vehicles dominated the starting grid. The winner of the race received $18,620 of the total winners ($163,474 when considering inflation) while the last-place finisher went home with $725 ($6,365 when considering inflation).

This was the last race for Smokey Yunick's team. Charlie Glotzbach brought the #13 Yunick Ford home in 4th place. The transition to purpose-built racecars began in the early 1960s and occurred gradually over that decade. Changes made to the sport by the late 1960s brought an end to the "strictly stock" vehicles of the 1950s.

Notable crew chiefs included Cotton Owens, Jim Vandiver, Dale Inman, Harry Hyde and Dick Hutcherson.

=== Qualifying ===
Grid	No.	Driver	Manufacturer	Owner
1	21	Cale Yarborough	'69 Mercury	Wood Brothers
2	98	LeeRoy Yarbrough	'69 Ford	Junior Johnson
3	43	Richard Petty	'69 Ford	Petty Enterprises
4	6	Buddy Baker	'69 Dodge	Cotton Owens
5	27	Donnie Allison	'69 Ford	Banjo Matthews
6	13	Charlie Glotzbach	'69 Ford	Smokey Yunick
7	17	David Pearson	'69 Ford	Holman-Moody Racing
8	71	Bobby Isaac	'69 Dodge	Nord Krauskopf
9	22	Bobby Allison	'69 Dodge	Mario Rossi
10	99	Paul Goldsmith	'69 Dodge	Ray Nichels
11	30	Dave Marcis	'69 Dodge	Milt Lunda
12	64	Elmo Langley	'68 Ford	Elmo Langley
13	45	Bill Seifert	'69 Ford	Bill Seifert
14	15	Ed Hessert	'69 Plymouth	Ed Hessert
15	32	Dick Brooks	'69 Plymouth	Dick Brooks
16	39	John Sears	'67 Chevrolet	Friday Hassler
17	48	James Hylton	'69 Dodge	James Hylton
18	49	G. C. Spencer	'67 Plymouth	G.C. Spencer
19	37	Don Tarr	'67 Dodge	Ray Fox
20	07	Coo Coo Marlin	'69 Chevrolet	H.B. Cunningham

Failed to qualify: Earl Brooks (#26), Roy Tyner (#9), John Sears (#4), Ron Grana (#05), Kenneth Cline (#69)

== Top 10 finishers ==
Pos	Grid	No.	Driver	Manufacturer	Laps	Winnings	Laps led	Time/Status
1	2	98	LeeRoy Yarbrough	Ford	334	$18,620	147	3:45:35
2	7	17	David Pearson	Ford	334	$9,750	57	+5.5 seconds
3	3	43	Richard Petty	Ford	334	$6,100	25	Lead lap under green flag
4	6	13	Charlie Glotzbach	Ford	333	$3,585	5	+1 lap
5	5	27	Donnie Allison	Ford	333	$2,775	0	+1 lap
6	9	22	Bobby Allison	Dodge	332	$2,200	1	+2 laps
7	1	21	Cale Yarborough	Mercury	331	$2,560	97	+3 laps
8	4	6	Buddy Baker	Dodge	331	$1,555	6	+3 laps
9	17	48	James Hylton	Dodge	327	$1,550	0	+7 laps
10	15	32	Dick Brooks	Plymouth	313	$1,475	0	+21 laps

== Timeline ==
Section reference:

- Start of race: Cale Yarborough had the pole position as the race officially commenced.
- Lap 3: John Sears managed to wreck his engine while racing at high speeds.
- Lap 28: Problems with his vehicle's clutch eliminated Don Tarr from the race.
- Lap 46: Bill Seifert managed to wreck his engine while racing at high speeds.
- Lap 50: Buddy Baker took over the lead from Cale Yarborough.
- Lap 53: Richard Petty took over the lead from Buddy Baker.
- Lap 55: Bobby Allison took over the lead from Richard Petty.
- Lap 56: Paul Goldsmith took over the lead from Bobby Allison.
- Lap 57: Cale Yarborough took over the lead from Paul Goldsmith.
- Lap 62: Ed Negre managed to wreck his engine while racing at high speeds.
- Lap 70: Charlie Glotzbach took over the lead from Cale Yarborough.
- Lap 73: Cale Yarborough took over the lead from Charlie Glotzbach.
- Lap 78: Dub Simpson managed to wreck his engine while racing at high speeds.
- Lap 82: Earl Brooks managed to wreck his engine while racing at high speeds.
- Lap 83: G.C. Spencer managed to wreck his engine while racing at high speeds.
- Lap 93: Bobby Isaac managed to wreck his engine while racing at high speeds.
- Lap 94: Buddy Baker took over the lead from Cale Yarborough.
- Lap 97: Cale Yarborough took over the lead from Buddy Baker.
- Lap 107: Hoss Ellington had a terminal crash.
- Lap 111: David Pearson took over the lead from Cale Yarborough.
- Lap 123: Charlie Glotzbach took over the lead from David Pearson.
- Lap 125: David Pearson took over the lead from Charlie Glotzbach.
- Lap 133: Dave Miller managed to wreck his engine while racing at high speeds.
- Lap 168: LeeRoy Yarbrough took over the lead from David Pearson.
- Lap 171: Richard Petty took over the lead from LeeRoy Yarbrough.
- Lap 182: LeeRoy Yarbrough took over the lead from Richard Petty.
- Lap 187: The sway bar on Wayne Gillette's vehicle became too much of a danger, forcing Gillette off the track.
- Lap 192: Elmo Langley managed to overheat his vehicle.
- Lap 207: Frank Warren managed to wreck his engine while racing at high speeds.
- Lap 240: Richard Petty took over the lead from LeeRoy Yarbrough.
- Lap 242: LeeRoy Yarbrough took over the lead from Richard Petty.
- Lap 244: Henley Gray ruined his vehicle's driveshaft.
- Lap 264: J. D. McDuffie managed to wreck his engine while racing at high speeds; Buddy Young damaged his vehicle's water pump beyond repair.
- Lap 291: David Pearson took over the lead from LeeRoy Yarbrough.
- Lap 293: Richard Petty took over the lead from David Pearson.
- Lap 303: LeeRoy Yarbrough took over the lead from Richard Petty.
- Finish: LeeRoy Yarbrough was officially declared the winner of the race.

Preceded by 1969 Smoky Mountain 200	NASCAR Grand National Series Season; 1969	Succeeded by 1969 Yankee 600
