= Fred Elder =

NASCAR team owner

Frederick "Fred" Elder is a former NASCAR Winston Cup Series race car owner whose primary manufacturer was Dodge. He owned Elder Racing, where his son Ray Elder competed in the Winston Cup and NASCAR Winston West Series, winning six championships in the latter series.

== Career ==
His career spanned from 1968 to 1976, employing legendary NASCAR driver Ray Elder through 26 races of his career.

Fred guided his son Ray to two Cup Series wins, nine finishes in the top five, fifteen finishes in the top ten, and 121 laps led out of 3247 laps competed. Elder earned a grand total of $96,425 during his career as a NASCAR Cup Series vehicle owner and seen his vehicle drive for exactly 8,228.0 miles or 13,241.7 kilometres. While starting an average of 12th place, Fred's vehicles finished an average of 14th place.
