= NASCAR Cup Series at Riverside International Raceway =

Auto race held in Riverside, United States

NASCAR Winston Cup Series at Riverside International Raceway

NASCAR Winston Cup Series
- Venue: Riverside International Raceway
- Location: Moreno Valley, California

Stock car races in the then-NASCAR Winston Cup Series have been held at the Riverside International Raceway in Riverside, California during numerous times of year and season from 1958 to 1988.

== November race ==
Winston Western 500
- Venue: Riverside International Raceway
- Corporate sponsor: Winston
- First race: 1958 Crown America 500
- Last race: 1987 Winston Western 500
- Distance: 311.8 miles (502 km)
- Laps: 119
- Previous names: Crown America 500 (1958); Unnamed (1961); Riverside 500 (1963); Motor Trend 500 (1964–1971); Winston Western 500 (1972–1987)
- Most wins (driver): Dan Gurney (5)
- Most wins (manufacturer): Ford (11)

The Winston Western 500 was an annual NASCAR Winston Cup race held at Riverside International Raceway in Riverside, California, United States, in January, and then in later years, November. From 1963 to 1981, the race was held in January and was the season opening race. NASCAR elected to start its season with the Daytona 500 beginning in 1982, so a second Winston Western 500 was run in November to accommodate the change; the change resulted in Riverside hosting three Winston Cup races in 1981. The race ran in November from 1981 to 1987, serving as the Winston Cup Series' final race of the year from 1981 to 1986. The race distance was 500 miles until 1977 when it was shortened to 311 miles (500 kilometers). The other race held at Riverside, the Budweiser 400, was held in June.

=== Past winners ===
Year	Date	No.	Driver	Team	Manufacturer	Race Distance		Race Time	Average Speed (mph)	Report	Ref
Year	Date	No.	Driver	Team	Manufacturer	Laps	Miles (km)	Race Time	Average Speed (mph)	Report	Ref
1958	June 1	98	Eddie Gray	Vel Miletich	Ford	190	499.89 (804.494)	6:17:00	79.481	Report	
1959 – 1960	Not held										
1961	May 21	44	Lloyd Dane	Lloyd Dane	Chevrolet	39	100.62 (161.932)	1:13:10	82.512	Report	
1962	Not held										
1963	January 20	28	Dan Gurney	Holman-Moody	Ford	185	499.5 (803.867)	5:53:20	84.965	Report	
1964	January 19	121	Dan Gurney	Wood Brothers Racing	Ford	185	499.5 (803.867)	5:28:47	91.245	Report	
1965	January 17	121	Dan Gurney	Wood Brothers Racing	Ford	185	499.5 (803.867)	5:41:42	87.708	Report	
1966	January 23	121	Dan Gurney	Wood Brothers Racing	Ford	185	499.5 (803.867)	5:05:58	97.952	Report	
1967	January 22	115	Parnelli Jones	Bill Stroppe	Ford	185	499.5 (803.867)	5:29:03	91.08	Report	
1968	January 21	121	Dan Gurney	Wood Brothers Racing	Ford	186	502.2 (808.212)	4:57:55	100.598	Report	
1969	February 1	43	Richard Petty	Petty Enterprises	Ford	186	502.2 (808.212)	4:45:37	105.498	Report	
1970	January 18	11	A. J. Foyt	Jack Bowsher	Ford	193	505.66 (813.78)	5:11:19	97.45	Report	
1971	January 10	96	Ray Elder	Fred Elder	Dodge	191	500.42 (805.347)	4:57:55	100.783	Report	
1972	January 23	43	Richard Petty	Petty Enterprises	Plymouth	149*	390.38 (628.255)	3:45:11	104.016	Report	
1973	January 21	16	Mark Donohue	Penske Racing	Matador	191	500.42 (805.347)	4:48:33	104.055	Report	
1974	January 26	11	Cale Yarborough	Richard Howard	Chevrolet	191	500.42 (805.347)	4:56:52	101.14	Report	
1975	January 19	16	Bobby Allison	Penske Racing	Matador	191	500.42 (805.347)	5:04:25	98.627	Report	
1976	January 18	21	David Pearson	Wood Brothers Racing	Mercury	191	500.42 (805.347)	5:02:44	99.18	Report	
1977	January 16	21	David Pearson	Wood Brothers Racing	Mercury	119	311.78 (501.761)	2:54:46	107.038	Report	
1978	January 22	11	Cale Yarborough	Junior Johnson & Associates	Oldsmobile	119	311.78 (501.761)	3:02:55	102.269	Report	
1979	January 14	88	Darrell Waltrip	DiGard Motorsports	Chevrolet	119	311.78 (501.761)	2:53:30	107.82	Report	
1980	January 13/19*	88	Darrell Waltrip	DiGard Motorsports	Chevrolet	119	311.78 (501.761)	3:16:58	94.974	Report	
1981	January 11	28	Bobby Allison	Ranier-Lundy	Chevrolet	119	311.78 (501.761)	3:16:18	95.263	Report	
1981	November 22	28	Bobby Allison	Ranier-Lundy	Buick	119	311.78 (501.761)	3:16:19	95.288	Report	
1982	November 21	2	Tim Richmond	Jim Stacy	Buick	119	311.78 (501.761)	3:07:24	99.823	Report	
1983	November 20	9	Bill Elliott	Melling Racing	Ford	119	311.78 (501.761)	3:15:09	95.859	Report	
1984	November 18	5	Geoff Bodine	All-Star Racing	Chevrolet	119	311.78 (501.761)	3:10:01	98.448	Report	
1985	November 17	15	Ricky Rudd	Bud Moore Engineering	Ford	119	311.78 (501.761)	2:58:03	105.065	Report	
1986	November 16	25	Tim Richmond	Hendrick Motorsports	Chevrolet	119	311.78 (501.761)	3:04:48	101.246	Report	
1987	November 8	27	Rusty Wallace	Blue Max Racing	Pontiac	119	311.78 (501.761)	3:10:49	98.035	Report	

- 1964: Two-time defending champion Joe Weatherly was killed instantly when he struck the turn 6 wall on lap 86. Weatherly was 41 years old.
- 1972: Race shortened due to fog.
- 1980: Race started on January 13; finished on January 19 because of rain.
- 1984: Race delayed several hours due to rain during the day - NASCAR was able to get the race in with darkness threatening. The race ended close to sunset (5 PM PT).

=== Multiple winners (drivers) ===
# Wins	Manufacturer	Years won
5	Dan Gurney	1963, 1964, 1965, 1966, 1968
3	Bobby Allison	1975, 1981 (Jan), 1981 (Nov)
2	Richard Petty	1969, 1972
2	David Pearson	1976, 1977
2	Cale Yarborough	1974, 1978
2	Darrell Waltrip	1979, 1980
2	Tim Richmond	1982, 1986

=== Multiple winners (manufacturers) ===
# Wins	Manufacturer	Years won
11	Ford	1958, 1963, 1964, 1965, 1966, 1967, 1968, 1969, 1970, 1983, 1985
7	Chevrolet	1961, 1974, 1979, 1980, 1981, 1984, 1986
2	Matador	1973, 1975
2	Mercury	1976, 1977
2	Buick	1981, 1982

== June race ==
Budweiser 400
- Corporate sponsor: Budweiser
- First race: 1963
- Last race: 1988
- Distance: 249 miles (400 km)
- Laps: 95
- Previous names: Golden State 400 (1963, 1971–1972); Falstaff 400 (1970); Tuborg 400 (1973–1975); Riverside 400 (1976); NAPA 400 (1977–1978); NAPA Riverside 400 (1979); Warner W. Hodgdon 400 (1980–1981); Budweiser 400 (1982–1988)

The Budweiser 400 was an annual summer NASCAR Winston Cup race held from 1970 to 1988 at Riverside International Raceway in Riverside, California, United States. A 400-mile race was also run at the track in November 1963. The race distance was 400 miles until 1976 when it was shortened to 249 miles (400 kilometers). The other race at Riverside, the Winston Western 500, was held in January from 1965 to 1981 and November from 1981 to 1987.

=== Past winners ===
Year	Date	No.	Driver	Team	Manufacturer	Race Distance		Race Time	Average Speed (mph)	Report	Ref
Year	Date	No.	Driver	Team	Manufacturer	Laps	Miles (km)	Race Time	Average Speed (mph)	Report	Ref
1963	Nov 3	16	Darel Dieringer	Bill Stroppe	Mercury	148	399.6 (643.093)	4:21:37	91.465	Report	
1964 – 1969	Not held										
1970	June 14	43	Richard Petty	Petty Enterprises	Plymouth	153	400.86 (645.121)	3:57:51	101.12	Report	
1971	June 20	12	Bobby Allison	Holman-Moody	Dodge	153	400.86 (645.121)	4:17:05	93.427	Report	
1972	June 18	96	Ray Elder	Fred Elder	Dodge	153	400.86 (645.121)	4:03:32	98.761	Report	
1973	June 17	12	Bobby Allison	Bobby Allison	Chevrolet	153	400.86 (645.121)	4:00:00	100.215	Report	
1974	June 9	11	Cale Yarborough	Richard Howard	Chevrolet	138*	361.56 (581.874)	3:31:40	102.489	Report	
1975	June 8	43	Richard Petty	Petty Enterprises	Dodge	153	400.86 (645.121)	3:58:04	101.028	Report	
1976	June 13	21	David Pearson	Wood Brothers Racing	Mercury	95	248.9 (400.565)	2:20:31	106.279	Report	
1977	June 12	43	Richard Petty	Petty Enterprises	Dodge	95	248.9 (400.565)	2:22:12	105.021	Report	
1978	June 11	72	Benny Parsons	L.G. DeWitt	Chevrolet	95	248.9 (400.565)	2:23:10	104.311	Report	
1979	June 10	15	Bobby Allison	Bud Moore Engineering	Ford	95	248.9 (400.565)	2:23:58	103.732	Report	
1980	June 8	88	Darrell Waltrip	DiGard Motorsports	Chevrolet	95	248.9 (400.565)	2:26:38	101.846	Report	
1981	June 14	11	Darrell Waltrip	Junior Johnson & Associates	Buick	95	248.9 (400.565)	2:39:30	93.597	Report	
1982	June 13	2	Tim Richmond	Jim Stacy	Buick	95	248.9 (400.565)	2:23:51	103.816	Report	
1983	June 5	3	Ricky Rudd	Richard Childress Racing	Chevrolet	95	248.9 (400.565)	2:49:35	88.063	Report	
1984	June 3	44	Terry Labonte	Billy Hagan	Chevrolet	95	248.9 (400.565)	2:25:07	102.91	Report	
1985	June 2	44	Terry Labonte	Billy Hagan	Chevrolet	95	248.9 (400.565)	2:23:13	104.276	Report	
1986	June 1	11	Darrell Waltrip	Junior Johnson & Associates	Chevrolet	95	248.9 (400.565)	2:22:07	105.083	Report	
1987	June 21	25	Tim Richmond	Hendrick Motorsports	Chevrolet	95	248.9 (400.565)	2:26:09	102.183	Report	
1988	June 12	27	Rusty Wallace	Blue Max Racing	Pontiac	95	248.9 (400.565)	2:43:03	88.341	Report	

- 1974: The race was shortened by 10% in response to the fuel crisis.

=== Multiple winners (drivers) ===
# Wins	Driver	Years won
3	Richard Petty	1970, 1975, 1977
3	Bobby Allison	1971, 1973, 1979
3	Darrell Waltrip	1980, 1981, 1986
2	Terry Labonte	1984, 1985
2	Tim Richmond	1982, 1987

=== Multiple winners (manufacturers) ===
# Wins	Manufacturer	Years won
9	Chevrolet	1973, 1974, 1978, 1980, 1983, 1984, 1985, 1986, 1987
4	Dodge	1971, 1972, 1975, 1977
2	Mercury	1963, 1976
2	Buick	1981, 1982
