= 1969 Myers Brothers 250 =

Auto race held at Bowman Gray Stadium in 1969

Race details
- Race 39 of 54 in the 1969 NASCAR Grand National Series season
- Date: August 22, 1969; 56 years ago
- Official name: Myers Brothers 250
- Location: Bowman Gray Stadium, Winston-Salem, North Carolina
- Course: Permanent racing facility
- Course length: 0.250 miles (0.421 km)
- Distance: 250 laps, 62.5 mi (100.5 km)
- Weather: Mild with temperatures of 77 °F (25 °C); wind speeds of 6 miles per hour (9.7 km/h)
- Average speed: 47.458 miles per hour (76.376 km/h)

Pole position
Driver	Richard Petty	Petty Enterprises

Most laps led
Driver	Bobby Isaac	K&K Insurance Racing
- Laps: 241

Winner
No. 43	Richard Petty	Petty Enterprises

Television in the United States
- Network: untelevised
- Announcers: none

The 1969 Myers Brothers 250 was a NASCAR Grand National Series event that was held on August 22, 1969, at Bowman Gray Stadium in Winston-Salem, North Carolina.

== Background ==
Bowman Gray Stadium is a NASCAR sanctioned 1/4-mile (0.40 km) asphalt flat oval short track and longstanding football stadium located in Winston-Salem, North Carolina. It is one of stock car racing's most legendary venues, and is referred to as "NASCAR's longest-running weekly race track". Bowman Gray Stadium is part of the Winston-Salem Sports and Entertainment Complex and is home of the Winston-Salem State University Rams football team. It was also the home of the Wake Forest University football team from 1956 until Groves Stadium (later BB&T Field) opened in 1968.

Bowman Gray Stadium would become a popular venue for high school football in the 1970s and 1980s.

== Race report ==
This race was the site of Richard Petty's 100th career victory in the NASCAR Cup Series driving the 1969 model year #43 Ford sponsored by Petty Enterprises. This victory allowed Richard Petty to join the elite group of auto racers who won 100 races in their chosen high-level motorsport. Lewis Hamilton is one of the auto racers to have achieved this in the 21st century.

Two hundred and fifty laps were completed on a paved oval track spanning .250 miles (0.402 km) for a grand total of 62.5 miles (100.6 km). The race took one hour and nineteen seconds for Richard Petty to defeat Bobby Isaac by four seconds in front a live audience of 10,500 people. The race was decided when Petty ran out of gas heading toward the pits and Isaac ran out of gas just after he passed by the pits. The time Isaac lost coasting all the way around was the difference between winning and losing. Notable speeds were: 47.458 miles per hour (76.376 km/h) as the average and 54.523 miles per hour (87.746 km/h) per hour as the pole position speed. Three cautions were given for seventeen laps. Out of the twenty-four cars, eleven had to drop out of the race before it finished.

Total winnings for this race were $6,975 in American dollars ($61,237 when adjusted for inflation). All twenty-four drivers were born in the United States of America.

Notable crew chiefs at the race were Harry Hyde, Dale Inman, Dick Hutcherson, and John Hill.

The transition to purpose-built racecars began in the early 1960s and occurred gradually over that decade. Changes made to the sport by the late 1960s brought an end to the "strictly stock" vehicles of the 1950s.

=== Qualifying ===
Grid	No.	Driver	Manufacturer
1	43	Richard Petty	'69 Ford
2	71	Bobby Isaac	'69 Dodge
3	17	David Pearson	'69 Ford
4	48	James Hylton	'68 Dodge
5	4	John Sears	'67 Ford
6	64	Elmo Langley	'68 Ford
7	06	Neil Castles	'69 Dodge
8	61	Hoss Ellington	'69 Ford
9	10	Bill Champion	'68 Ford
10	08	E.J. Trivette	'69 Chevrolet
11	34	Wendell Scott	'67 Ford
12	47	Cecil Gordon	'68 Ford
13	45	Bill Seifert	'69 Ford
14	8	Ed Negre	'67 Plymouth
15	09	Wayne Gillette	'67 Chevrolet
16	26	Earl Brooks	'67 Ford
17	76	Ben Arnold	'68 Ford
18	12	Pete Hazelwood	'68 Ford
19	70	J.D. McDuffie	'67 Buick
20	04	Ken Meisenhelder	'67 Oldsmobile
21	25	Jabe Thomas	'69 Plymouth
22	19	Henley Gray	'68 Ford
23	23	James Cox	'67 Ford
24	33	Wayne Smith	'68 Chevrolet

== Finishing order ==
Section reference:

1. Richard Petty (No. 43)
2. Bobby Isaac† (No. 71)
3. David Pearson† (No. 17)
4. Elmo Langley† (No. 64)
5. James Hylton (No. 48)
6. John Sears† (No. 4)
7. Neil Castles (No. 06)
8. J. D. McDuffie† (No. 70)
9. Wendell Scott† (No. 34)
10. E.J. Trivette (No. 08)
11. Ken Meisenhelder (No. 04)
12. Ben Arnold (No. 76)
13. Bill Champion*† (No. 10)
14. Henley Gray* (No. 19)
15. Peter Hazelwood* (No. 12)
16. Ed Negre* (No. 8)
17. Bill Seifert* (No. 45)
18. James Cox* (No. 23)
19. Wayne Smith* (No. 33)
20. Cecil Gordon*† (No. 47)
21. Earl Brooks* (No. 26)
22. Wayne Gillette* (No. 09)
23. Hoss Ellington*† (No. 61)

* Driver failed to finish race
† signifies that the driver is known to be deceased

== Timeline ==
Section reference:

- Start of race: Bobby Isaac started the race with the pole position.
- Lap 2: Hoss Ellington quit the race for reasons unknown.
- Lap 4: Wayne Gillette quit the race for reasons unknown.
- Lap 16: Earl Brooks quit the race for reasons unknown.
- Lap 24: Cecil Gordon quit the race for reasons unknown.
- Lap 25: Wayne Smith accidentally blew his engine, forcing him to exit the race early.
- Lap 26: An oil leak forced James Cox to abandon the race, finishing in 19th place.
- Lap 29: Bill Seifert quit the race for reasons unknown.
- Lap 82: Ed Negre had to withdraw from the race due to transmission issues.
- Lap 91: Pete Hazelwood quit the race for reasons unknown.
- Lap 93: Henley Grey noticed that his brakes stopped working on his racing vehicle.
- Lap 153: The brakes on Bill Champion's vehicle stopped working.
- Lap 242: Richard Petty took over the leader from Bobby Isaac.
- Finish: Richard Petty was officially declared the winner of the event.

Preceded by 1969 South Boston 100	NASCAR Grand National Series Season; 1969	Succeeded by 1969 Western North Carolina 500

Preceded by 1969 Smoky Mountain 200	Richard Petty's Career Wins; 1960-1984	Succeeded by 1969 Old Dominion 500
