= Scotty Cain =

American racing driver (1920–1994)

- Born: Scott Hunter Cain; August 11, 1920; Sandborn, Indiana, U.S.
- Died: December 2, 1994 (aged 74); Fresno, California, U.S.
- Awards: West Coast Stock Car Hall of Fame (2002 - Inaugural Class)

NASCAR Cup Series career
- 36 races run over 14 years
- Best finish: 32nd (1957)
- First race: 1956 Race 3 (Willow Springs)
- Last race: 1971 Winston Golden State 400 (Riverside)
Wins	Top tens	Poles
0	21	0

ARCA Menards Series career
- 4 races run over 1 year
- First race: 1958 Race 19 (Milwaukee)
- Last race: 1958 Race 29 (DuQuoin)
Wins	Top tens	Poles
0	1	0

ARCA Menards Series West career
- 187 races run over 17 years
- Best finish: 1st (1967, 1968)
- First race: 1955 Race 13 (Gardena)
- Last race: 1971 San Gabriel Valley 100 (San Gabriel)
- First win: 1959 Race 3 (Belmont)
- Last win: 1969 Race 17 (Portland)
Wins	Top tens	Poles
11	121	7
- Statistics up to date as of August 22, 2026.

Scott Hunter Cain (August 11, 1920 – December 2, 1994) was an American professional stock car racing driver. He primarily competed in the NASCAR Winston Cup Series and NASCAR Winston West Series, the latter of which he won two championships in, coming in 1967 and 1968.

== Racing career ==
Cain made a start in the Pacific Racing Association Hard Top Division in 1951, finishing 12th at Culver City Speedway. He competed in the NASCAR Late Model Sportsman National Championship in 1954, finishing 752nd in the overall standings.

Cain made two starts in the NASCAR Pacific Coast Late Model Division in 1955, with an unknown result at Gardena Stadium and a seventh-place finish at Willow Springs Speedway. He also won a race in the California Racing Association.

Cain competed in eleven Pacific Coast Late Model Division races in 1956, scoring seven top-ten finishes. He would also make his NASCAR Grand National Series debut at Willow Springs Speedway, finishing seventh; he also finished top-ten in three combination races with the Pacific Coast Late Model Division. 1956 also saw Cain begin racing in the USAC Stock Car Series, where he finished top-ten in three of six starts. The series additionally sanctioned a Pacific Coast Division and Short Track Division that year, where Cain made seven starts with five top-tens in the former and five starts with three top-tens in the latter.

Cain competed in 20 of 24 NASCAR Pacific Coast Late Model Division races in 1957, scoring sixteen top-ten finishes. He finished third in the standings. Cain also made 11 starts in the Grand National Series, including one at the Daytona Beach and Road Course, scoring a season-best of fourth in three different races. He finished 32nd in the standings. Cain competed in at least 12 NASCAR Short Track Division races, scoring ten top-ten finishes. He won in his only known California Racing Association start of the year at DeAnza Park.

Cain made at least three Pacific Coast Late Model starts in 1958, scoring two top-tens. In the combination race at Riverside International Raceway, he finished eighth. Cain competed in at least four races in the MARC Racing Series, scoring a top-ten at Dayton Speedway. He also returned to the USAC Stock Car Series, scoring a best result of 20th. In two NASCAR Short Track Division starts that were in combination with the Pacific Coast Late Model Division, he finished 17th and fourth at Gardena Stadium. In Cain's only known IMCA Stock Car Series start of the season, he finished sixth at Mason City Motor Speedway.

Cain competed in at least six of seven Pacific Coast Late Model Division races in 1959, scoring his first two wins, coming at Belmont Speedway and Kearney Bowl, and scoring five total top-tens. In the two combination races with the Grand National Series, he would finish 19th at Ascot Stadium and second at the California State Fairgrounds Race Track. In five combination races with the Short Track Division, Cain scored two wins and four top-tens. He made at least three IMCA Stock Car Series starts, scoring two top-tens.

Cain ran at least eight Pacific Coast Late Model Division races in 1960, scoring a best result of second at the California State Fairgrounds. Cain made a standalone Grand National start at Southern States Fairgrounds, finishing eighteenth, and three starts in combination races, scoring two top-fives. In at least ten Pacific Coast Late Model starts in 1961, Cain scored at least four top-ten finishes. In four combination races with the Grand National Series, he scored a top-ten at Marchbanks Speedway.

In seven known Pacific Coast Late Model starts in 1962, Cain scored two top-tens. His only NASCAR starts in 1963 were the combination races at Riverside, finishing 21st and 28th.

In at least thirteen Pacific Coast Late Model starts in 1964, Cain scored eight top-tens. He failed to qualify for the combination race at Riverside. Cain finished twelfth in his only known USAC Stock Car start of the season.

Cain scored seven top-tens in ten known Pacific Coast Late Model starts in 1965. He finished seventh in the combination race at Riverside. In two USAC Stock Car starts, Cain scored a best result of second.

Cain attempted fourteen of fifteen Pacific Coast Late Model races in 1966, failing to qualify at Vallejo Speedway, scoring a win at Ascot Park, and finishing in the top-ten nine times. He finished 36th in the combination race at Riverside.

Cain competed full-time in the Pacific Coast Late Model Division in 1967, scoring five wins, including the inaugural race at Shasta Speedway, where he led every lap, and 16 top-tens. He secured his first championship by 438 points over Ray Elder. In the combination race at Riverside, Cain finished in seventh.

Cain competed in nineteen of twenty Pacific Coast Late Model races in 1968, scoring a win at Vallejo Speedway and fifteen top-ten finishes. Despite missing a race, Cain scored his second consecutive championship, beating Elder by just two points. In the combination race at Riverside, he finished ninth. Cain also competed in a USAC Stock Car race at the Phoenix International Raceway Road Course.

Cain would again run nineteen of twenty Pacific Coast Late Model races in 1969, scoring his final career win at Portland Speedway and scoring eleven top-ten finishes. In the combination race at Riverside, he finished in eighth.

Cain made fourteen starts in the renamed Grand National West in 1970, scoring five top-tens. In the combination races at Riverside, he finished 42nd and 28th. He would also make his final USAC Stock Car starts, scoring a top-ten at Sears Point Raceway.

Cain's final NASCAR season came in 1971, where he made ten starts in the renamed Winston West Series, scoring eight top-ten finishes. He failed to qualify for the combination race at Ontario Motor Speedway and made his final start in the renamed Winston Cup Series in the Riverside combination race, finishing eighth.

== Personal life ==
Cain was born in Sandborn, Indiana to Jonas Scott Cain and Doris Brown. He married Zelda Eloise Bicknell on July 28, 1941, in Knox, Indiana, and lived in Indianapolis that year. He later lived in California.

== Death ==
Cain died at the age of 74 in Fresno, California on December 2, 1994.

== Motorsports career results ==
=== NASCAR ===
(key) (Bold – Pole position awarded by qualifying time. Italics – Pole position earned by points standings or practice time. * – Most laps led.)

==== Grand National Series ====
NASCAR Grand National Series results
Year	Team	No.	Make	1	2	3	4	5	6	7	8	9	10	11	12	13	14	15	16	17	18	19	20	21	22	23	24	25	26	27	28	29	30	31	32	33	34	35	36	37	38	39	40	41	42	43	44	45	46	47	48	49	50	51	52	53	54	55	56	57	58	59	60	61	62	NGNSC	Pts	Ref
1956	Scotty Cain	10	Ford	HCY	CLT	WSS; 7	PBS	ASF; 6	DAB	PBS	WIL	ATL	NWS	LAN	RCH	CLB	CON	GPS	HCY	HBO	MAR	LIN	CLT	POR	EUR	NYF	MER	MAS	CLT	MCF	POR	AWS	RSP	PIF	CSF	CHI	CCF	MGY	OKL	ROA	OBS																									NA	NA	
1956	Scotty Cain	21	Ford																																							SAN; 5	NOR	PIF	MYB	POR; 10	DAR	CSH	CLT	LAN	POR	CLB	HBO	NWP	CLT	CCF	MAR	HCY	WIL							NA	NA	
1957	Scotty Cain	21	Ford	WSS; 8	CON	TIC																																																												32nd	1504	
1957	Scotty Cain	121	Ford				DAB; 26	CON	WIL	HBO	AWS	NWS	LAN	CLT	PIF	GBF																																																		32nd	1504	
1957	Scotty Cain	14	Mercury														POR; 11	CCF	RCH	MAR		EUR; 11	LIN	LCS	ASP; 6	NWP	CLB	CPS; 4	PIF	JAC	RSP	CLT	MAS	POR; 4	HCY	NOR	LCS	GLN	KPC; 6	LIN	OBS	MYB	DAR	NYF	AWS	CSF; 9	SCF; 22	LAN	CLB	CCF	CLT	MAR	NBR	CON	NWS	GBF										32nd	1504	
1957	Scotty Cain	44	Mercury																		POR; 4																																													32nd	1504	
1958	Scotty Cain	3	Mercury	FAY	DAB	CON	FAY	WIL	HBO	FAY	CLB	PIF	ATL	CLT	MAR	ODS	OBS	GPS	GBF	STR	NWS	BGS	TRN	RSD; 8	CLB	NBS	REF	LIN	HCY	AWS	RSP	MCC	SLS	TOR	BUF	MCF	BEL	BRR	CLB	NSV	AWS	BGS	MBS	DAR	CLT	BIR	CSF	GAF	RCH	HBO	SAS	MAR	NWS	ATL												NA	NA	
1959	Scotty Cain	1	Ford	FAY	DAY	DAY	HBO	CON	ATL	WIL	BGS	CLB	NWS	REF	HCY	MAR	TRN	CLT	NSV	ASP; 19	PIF	GPS	ATL	CLB	WIL	RCH	BGS	AWS	DAY	HEI	CLT	MBS	CLT	NSV	AWS	BGS	GPS	CLB	DAR	HCY	RCH																									79th	192	
1959	Scotty Cain	3	T-Bird																																							CSF; 2	HBO	MAR	AWS	NWS	CON																			79th	192	
1960	Scotty Cain	3	T-Bird	CLT; 18	CLB	DAY	DAY	DAY	CLT	NWS																																																								79th	496	
1960	Scotty Cain	4	T-Bird								PHO; 3	CLB	MAR	HCY	WIL	BGS	GPS	AWS	DAR	PIF	HBO	RCH	HMS; 26	CLT	BGS	DAY	HEI	MAB	MBS	ATL	BIR	NSV	AWS	PIF	CLB	SBO	BGS	DAR	HCY	CSF; 2	GSP	HBO	MAR	NWS	CLT	RCH	ATL																			79th	496	
1961	Scotty Cain	4	T-Bird	CLT	JSP	DAY	DAY	DAY	PIF	AWS	HMS; 8	ATL	GPS	HBO	BGS	MAR	NWS	CLB	HCY	RCH	MAR	DAR	CLT	CLT	RSD; 11	ASP; 21	CLT	PIF	BIR	GPS	BGS	NOR	HAS	STR	DAY	ATL	CLB	MBS	BRI	NSV	BGS	AWS	RCH	SBO	DAR	HCY	RCH																			89th	784	
1961	Scotty Cain	12N	T-Bird																																													CSF; 32	ATL	MAR	NWS	CLT	BRI	GPS	HBO											89th	784	
1963	Scotty Cain	51	Ford	BIR	GGS	THS	RSD; 21	DAY	DAY	DAY	PIF	AWS	HBO	ATL	HCY	BRI	AUG	RCH	GPS	SBO	BGS	MAR	NWS	CLB	THS	DAR	ODS	RCH	CLT	BIR	ATL	DAY	MBS	SVH	DTS	BGS	ASH	OBS	BRR	BRI	GPS	NSV	CLB	AWS	PIF	BGS	ONA	DAR	HCY	RCH	MAR	DTS	NWS	THS	CLT	SBO	HBO									74th	768	
1963	Scotty Cain	162	Ford																																																							RSD; 28								74th	768	
1964	Clinton Racing	13	Ford	CON	AUG	JSP	SVH	RSD; DNQ	DAY	DAY	DAY	RCH	BRI	GPS	BGS	ATL	AWS	HBO	PIF	CLB	NWS	MAR	SVH	DAR	LGY	HCY	SBO	CLT	GPS	ASH	ATL	CON	NSV	CHT	BIR	VAL	PIF	DAY	ODS	OBS	BRR	ISP	GLN	LIN	BRI	NSV	MBS	AWS	DTS	ONA	CLB	BGS	STR	DAR	HCY	RCH	ODS	HBO	MAR	SVH	NWS	CLT	HAR	AUG	JAC	NA	0	
1965	Clinton Racing	45	Mercury	RSD; 7	DAY	DAY	DAY	PIF	AWS	RCH	HBO	ATL	GPS	NWS	MAR	CLB	BRI	DAR	LGY	BGS	HCY	CLT	CCF	ASH	HAR	NSV	BIR	ATL	GPS	MBS	VAL	DAY	ODS	OBS	ISP	GLN	BRI	NSV	CCF	AWS	SMR	PIF	AUG	CLB	DTS	BLV	BGS	DAR	HCY	LIN	ODS	RCH	MAR	NWS	CLT	HBO	CAR	DTS								57th	2000	
1966	Clinton Racing	145	Mercury	AUG	RSD; 36	DAY	DAY	DAY	CAR	BRI	ATL	HCY	CLB	GPS	BGS	NWS	MAR	DAR	LGY	MGR	MON	RCH	CLT	DTS	ASH	PIF	SMR	AWS	BLV	GPS	DAY	ODS	BRR	OXF	FON	ISP	BRI	SMR	NSV	ATL	CLB	AWS	BLV	BGS	DAR	HCY	RCH	HBO	MAR	NWS	CLT	CAR														NA	NA	
1967	Clinton Racing	451	Ford	AUG	RSD; 7	DAY	DAY	DAY	AWS	BRI	GPS	BGS	ATL	CLB	HCY	NWS	MAR	SVH	RCH	DAR	BLV	LGY	CLT	ASH	MGR	SMR	BIR	CAR	GPS	MGY	DAY	TRN	OXF	FDA	ISP	BRI	SMR	NSV	ATL	BGS	CLB	SVH	DAR	HCY	RCH	BLV	HBO	MAR	NWS	CLT	CAR	AWS														59th	2332	
1968	Clinton Racing	45	Ford	MGR	MGY	RSD; 9	DAY	BRI	RCH	ATL	HCY	GPS	CLB	NWS	MAR	AUG	AWS	DAR	BLV	LGY	CLT	ASH	MGR	SMR	BIR	CAR	GPS	DAY	ISP	OXF	FDA	TRN	BRI	SMR	NSV	ATL	CLB	BGS	AWS	SBO	LGY	DAR	HCY	RCH	BLV	HBO	MAR	NWS	AUG	CLT	CAR	JFC														74th	NA	
1969	Clinton Racing	45	Ford	MGR	MGY	RSD; 8	DAY	DAY	DAY	CAR	AUG	BRI	ATL	CLB	HCY	GPS	RCH	NWS	MAR	AWS	DAR	BLV	LGY	CLT	MGR	SMR	MCH	KPT	GPS	NCF	DAY	DOV	TPN	TRN	BLV	BRI	NSV	SMR	ATL	MCH	SBO	BGS	AWS	DAR	HCY	RCH	TAL	CLB	MAR	NWS	CLT	SVH	AUG	CAR	JFC	MGR	TWS									63rd	129	
1970	Clinton Racing	45	Ford	RSD; 42	DAY	DAY	DAY	RCH	CAR	SVH	ATL	BRI	TAL	NWS	CLB	DAR	BLV	LGY	CLT	SMR	MAR	MCH	RSD; 28	HCY	KPT	GPS	DAY	AST	TPN	TRN	BRI	SMR	NSV	ATL	CLB	ONA	MCH	TAL	BGS	SBO	DAR	HCY	RCH	DOV	NCF	NWS	CLT	MAR	MGR	CAR	LGY															111th	27	
1971	Bob Clough	1	Ford	RSD	DAY	DAY	DAY	ONT; DNQ	RCH	CAR	HCY	BRI	ATL	CLB	GPS	SMR	NWS	MAR	DAR	SBO	TAL	ASH	KPT	CLT	DOV	MCH	RSD; 8	HOU	GPS	DAY	BRI	AST	ISP	TRN	NSV	ATL	BGS	ONA	MCH	TAL	CLB	HCY	DAR	MAR	CLT	DOV	CAR	MGR	RCH	NWS	TWS															NA	NA	

==== Winston West Series ====
NASCAR Winston West Series results
Year	Team	No.	Make	1	2	3	4	5	6	7	8	9	10	11	12	13	14	15	16	17	18	19	20	21	22	23	24	25	26	27	28	29	30	31	32	NWWSC	Pts	Ref
1955	Scotty Cain	10	Ford	ASF	TUS	GAR	CCS	MBS	BAL	GAR	BMS	CCS	BAL	GAR	LVS	GAR; 0†	WSR; 7																			NA	NA	
1956	Scotty Cain	10	Ford	GAR; 15	ASF; 6	GAR; 9	GAR	SMS	GAR	BEL	POR	GAR	EUR	MER	BST	HBS	POR	GAR	BST	CSF	BEL	CCS	BKS													17th	1276	
1956	Oscar Maples	21	Ford																					GAR; 5			BST; 4						GAR; 13		GAR; 11	17th	1276	
1956	Scotty Cain	21	Ford																						BMS; 5	POR; 10								WSS; 8		17th	1276	
1956	Oscar Maples	45	Ford																									GAR; 11	HUG	POR	GAR	SCF				17th	1276	
1957	Scotty Cain	21	Ford	GAR; 6	GAR; 9	GAR	BKS																													3rd	3032	
1957	Scotty Cain	14	Mercury					POR; 11	GAR; 5		GAR; 11	RAS; 11	SGS	SRS; 2	ASP; 6	CCS; 4	WCS; 4	MER; 9	GAR; 10	BAL; 4	POR; 4	BEL; 3	KPC; 6	ASP	ASP; 6	CSF; 9	SCF; 22									3rd	3032	
1957	Scotty Cain	44	Mercury							POR; 4																										3rd	3032	
1958	Scotty Cain	3	Ford	GAR; 17	GAR; 4	GAR	BEL																													NA	NA	
1958	Scotty Cain	3	Mercury					RSD; 8	BAL	GAR	BAL	CSF																								NA	NA	
1959	Scotty Cain	1	Ford	ASP	ASP; 19																															3rd	1118	
1959	Unknown	NA	T-Bird			**BEL**; 1	GAR; 5	BAL; 3		KEA; 1																										3rd	1118	
1959	Scotty Cain	3	T-Bird						CSF; 2																											3rd	1118	
1960	Unknown	NA	T-Bird	ASP	ASP; 3																															8th	1076	
1960	Scotty Cain	4	T-Bird			ASF; 3		HMS; 26							CSF; 2	RSD	ASP	BAL	ASP																	8th	1076	
1960	Unknown	NA	Unknown				ASP; 0†		ASP; 0†	BAL	RSD			ASP; 0†																						8th	1076	
1960	Unknown	NA	Ford									KEA; 10	BKS																							8th	1076	
1961	Unknown	4	T-Bird	ASP; 0†			ASP; 4		ASP; 21	ASP						ANS	ASP																			11th	1408	
1961	Scotty Cain	4	T-Bird		HMS; 8																															11th	1408	
1961	Unknown	NA	Unknown			KEA; 11		RSD; 11				ATS; 4	BON	ASP																						11th	1408	
1961	Unknown	NA	Ford								ANS; 5																									11th	1408	
1961	Scotty Cain	12N	T-Bird												CSF; 32																					11th	1408	
1961	Unknown	NA	T-Bird													ANS; 0†	ASP																			11th	1408	
1962	Unknown	NA	Ford	ASP	HMS; 11	ASP; 11	GAR; 6	SGS; 11	GAR; 7	BKS		CSF; 22	ASP																							9th	692	
1962	Unknown	NA	Unknown								ASP; 16																									9th	692	
1963	Scotty Cain	51	Ford	RSD; 21	ASP	RSD	SAL	SGS	TUC	MNP	SMF	MNP																								19th	480	
1963	Scotty Cain	162	Ford										RSD; 28																							19th	480	
1964	Clinton Racing	45	Ford	CSP; 6		SJS; 9	POR	EVG	YAK; 14	EUG	CTR; 18	POR	RAS; 12	ASP	TAC	SAL	POR	JBA	EVG			ASP; 6		ASP; 3	GHR	SWF	JBA				CSF; 12	ASP				9th	1998	
1964	Clinton Racing	13	Ford		RSD; DNQ															SGS; 7	BKS; 9															9th	1998	
1964	Clinton Racing	45	Mercury																				OIR; 10					ASP; 13								9th	1998	
1964	Unknown	NA	Ford																										ASP; 4	POR						9th	1998	
1965	Clinton Racing	45	Ford	BRS; 6						BRS; 8	POR																									8th	1854	
1965	Clinton Racing	45	Mercury		RSD; 7	SJS; 2	ASP; 24	POR; 8	EVG			ASP; 0†	POR; 7	ASP	ASP	CSF; 8	ASP; 0†																			8th	1854	
1966	Clinton Racing	145	Mercury	RSD; 36																																5th	2000	
1966	Clinton Racing	45	Mercury		S99; 4	ASP; 22	ASP; 10	DCS; 3	POR; 6	ASP; 1	OSS; 4	VAL; DNQ	S99; 12	**ASP**; 18		POR; 3	SGV; 5	CSF; 2																		5th	2000	
1966	Clinton Racing	4	Ford												AMP; 15																					5th	2000	
1967	Clinton Racing	45	Mercury	AMP; 5																																1st	3326	
1967	Clinton Racing	45	Ford		SGV; 5		**CPS**; 2	**SHA**; 1*	SAL; 3	POR; 1	ASP; 12	SGV; 8	OSS; 19	ASP; 1	**ACF**; 1*	**RVR**; 1	SAL; 11	JBA; 5	YAK; 7	EVG; 7	ASP; 5	CSP; 2														1st	3326	
1967	Clinton Racing	451	Ford			RSD; 3																														1st	3326	
1968	Clinton Racing	45	Ford	RSD; 4	ASP; 16	KEA; 4	VAL; 1*	ASP; 12	AMP; 5	DCS; 6	POR; 3	EVG; 8	EUG; 9	MED; 4	OSS; 11	TCR; 11	YAK; 2	EVG	EUR; 6	BKS; 5	S99; 3	CSP; 3	SGS; 3													1st	1051	
1969	Clinton Racing	45	Ford	RSD; 8	CSF; 4	SGV; 21	SON; 24	EVG; 1	TCR; 15	YAK; 15	DCS; 14	SAL; 12	JBA; 5	OSS; 10	SGS; 6	SON; 10	YAK; 2	EVG; 0†	CPR; 12	POR; 1	SMS; 2	SGV; 8	TWS													5th	944	
1970	Clinton Racing	45	Ford	RSD; 42	ASP	SGB; 14	CSF; 9	RSD; 28	YAK; 4	EVG; 14	JBA	CRS	OSS; 12	SGS	MED; 15	SAL; 16	SPS; 7	TCR; 11	WSP	S99; 7	ASP; 16	SGB; 6														10th	612	
1971	Bob Clough	1	Ford	RSD	ONT; DNQ	OSS	SJS	CRS	S99	ASP	RSD; 8	SAL	SPS; 10	SKA; 6	USP; 19	POR	LSP	MED	DCS	CRS; 9	OSS; QL^{‡}	SGS	BKS	CSP; 4	EVG; 6	IFS; 16	YAK; 16	SGB; 8	TWS							16th	503	
^{‡} – Qualified but replaced by Bob England

† - It is known Cain participated in these races, but his final position is unknown.
