= Dick Bown =

American racing driver (1928–2024)

- Born: Richard Bown; August 12, 1928; Gettysburg, South Dakota, U.S.
- Died: May 12, 2024 (aged 95); Portland, Oregon, U.S.
- Awards: West Coast Stock Car Hall of Fame (2003)

NASCAR Cup Series career
- 21 races run over 10 years
- Best finish: 51st (1970)
- First race: 1961 Race 8 (Hanford)
- Last race: 1975 Winston Western 500 (Riverside)
Wins	Top tens	Poles
0	1	0

ARCA Menards Series West career
- 138 races run over 14 years
- Best finish: 3rd (1972)
- First race: 1961 Race 2 (Hanford)
- Last race: 1975 Winston Western 500 (Riverside)
- First win: 1964 Race 5 (Evergreen)
- Last win: 1973 Cajon Tuborg 150 (Cajon)
Wins	Top tens	Poles
14	85	10
- Statistics up to date as of May 26, 2026.

Richard Bown (August 12, 1928 – May 12, 2024) was an American professional stock car racing driver. He competed in the NASCAR Winston Cup Series and NASCAR Winston West Series between 1961 and 1975. He was an inductee to the West Coast Stock Car/Motorsports Hall of Fame in 2003.

== Racing career ==
Bown's first racecar was a 1937 Ford Coupe, which he purchased for $5, and he drove it in his first race in Salem, Oregon.

In 1961, Bown made his NASCAR Grand National Series debut at Marchbanks Speedway, finishing seventeenth in his self-owned Chevrolet. This also doubled as his NASCAR Pacific Coast Late Model Division debut; his first standalone start in the series came in the following race at Kearney Bowl, where he finished tenth.

Bown is known to have competed in two races in 1962, scoring another top-ten at the California State Fairgrounds Race Track.

Bown's next Grand National start came in 1963 at Riverside International Raceway, where he finished nineteenth. His only known standalone Pacific Coast Late Model Division start of the year came at Manzanita Speedway, where he finished second.

In 1964, Bown expanded his NASCAR Pacific Coast Late Model Division schedule, competing in eighteen of 29 races. Across those starts, he scored eleven top-tens, three wins, and three poles. Bown's wins came at Evergreen Speedway, Eugene Speedway, and Ascot Park.

Bown ran eight of fourteen races in 1965, scoring five top-tens. This included the combination race with the Grand National Series at Riverside, where he finished 27th due to engine issues.

In 1966, Bown only attempted four races, making three starts and failing to qualify for the race at the California State Fairgrounds Race Track. He did not compete in the series in 1967.

In 1968, Bown made one start, coming at Tri-City Raceway, where he finished eighth.

Bown made one Grand National Series start in 1969, finishing twelfth at Riverside. He is known to have competed in seventeen Pacific Coast Late Model Division races, scoring a win at Jantzen Beach Arena. He also won the Apple Cup at Yakima Speedway.

Bown competed in all but one race in 1970, scoring six wins, eleven top-tens, and four poles. He finished sixth in the standings. He also competed in six Grand National Series races, scoring his only career top-ten at Smoky Mountain Raceway.

Bown ran fourteen of 26 races in 1971 in the renamed Winston West Series, but only scored four top-tens. He made four Winston Cup starts, including the World 600.

Bown competed in all 30 West Series races in 1972, scoring three wins, eighteen top-fives, and 23 top-tens. He finished a career-best third in points. His only Winston Cup starts were combination races, with his best finish being thirteenth in both Riverside races.

Bown's final full-time West Series season was 1973, where he scored a win, twelve top-fives, and sixteen top-tens in 21 races. He failed to finish the combination races at Riverside.

Bown competed in one race in 1974, a combination race at Riverside, finishing 30th.

Bown's final start in both the Cup and West series was the 1975 Winston Western 500, where he finished 30th due to engine issues. He then retired from racing to focus on supporting the racing careers of his children.

== Personal life ==
Bown was born on August 12, 1928, in Gettysburg, South Dakota, to Walter Bown and Annetta Ulmer Bown. He grew up in the state, where he first developed his love for cars. He settled in Portland, Oregon in 1941, where he met his wife, Evelyn Ferguson Bown, with whom he had three children: Sheri, Chuck, and Jim. Chuck and Jim both became NASCAR drivers, with Chuck winning championships in the NASCAR Winston West Series and NASCAR Busch Series, and Jim winning seven races in the West Series. Bown was a self-made millionaire in the auto wrecking business. He opened his business, Rose Auto Wrecking, in 1953, and ran it for over 60 years. Bown became president of the Auto Wreckers Association and in the 1960s, he testified before Congress on their behalf.

== Motorsports career results ==
=== NASCAR ===
(key) (Bold – Pole position awarded by qualifying time. Italics – Pole position earned by points standings or practice time. * – Most laps led.)

==== Grand National Series ====
NASCAR Grand National Series results																																																													
Year	Team	No.	Make	1	2	3	4	5	6	7	8	9	10	11	12	13	14	15	16	17	18	19	20	21	22	23	24	25	26	27	28	29	30	31	32	33	34	35	36	37	38	39	40	41	42	43	44	45	46	47	48	49	50	51	52	53	54	55	NGNC	Pts	Ref
1961	Bown Racing	61N	Chevy	CLT	JSP	DAY	DAY	DAY	PIF	AWS	HMS; 17	ATL	GPS	HBO	BGS	MAR	NWS	CLB	HCY	RCH	MAR	DAR	CLT	CLT	RSD	ASP	CLT	PIF	BIR	GPS	BGS	NOR	HAS	STR	DAY	ATL	CLB	MBS	BRI	NSV	BGS	AWS	RCH	SBO	DAR	HCY	RCH	CSF	ATL	MAR	NWS	CLT	BRI	GPS	HBO				136th	216	
1963	Bown Racing	61	Chevy	BIR	GGS	THS	RSD; 19	DAY	DAY	DAY	PIF	AWS	HBO	ATL	HCY	BRI	AUG	RCH	GPS	SBO	BGS	MAR	NWS	CLB	THS	DAR	ODS	RCH	CLT	BIR	ATL	DAY	MBS	SVH	DTS	BGS	ASH	OBS	BRR	BRI	GPS	NSV	CLB	AWS	PIF	BGS	ONA	DAR	HCY	RCH	MAR	DTS	NWS	THS	CLT	SBO	HBO	RSD	77th	880	
1965	Bown Racing	611	Plymouth	RSD; 27	DAY	DAY	DAY	PIF	AWS	RCH	HBO	ATL	GPS	NWS	MAR	CLB	BRI	DAR	LGY	BGS	HCY	CLT	CCF	ASH	HAR	NSV	BIR	ATL	GPS	MBS	VAL	DAY	ODS	OBS	ISP	GLN	BRI	NSV	CCF	AWS	SMR	PIF	AUG	CLB	DTS	BLV	BGS	DAR	HCY	LIN	ODS	RCH	MAR	NWS	CLT	HBO	CAR	DTS	98th	300	
1969	Mike Ober	61	Chevy	MGR	MGY	RSD; 12	DAY	DAY	DAY	CAR	AUG	BRI	ATL	CLB	HCY	GPS	RCH	NWS	MAR	AWS	DAR	BLV	LGY	CLT	MGR	SMR	MCH	KPT	GPS	NCF	DAY	DOV	TPN	TRN	BLV	BRI	NSV	SMR	ATL	MCH	SBO	BGS	AWS	DAR	HCY	RCH	TAL	CLB	MAR	NWS	CLT	SVH	AUG	CAR	JFC	MGR	TWS		NA	NA	
1970	Mike Ober	61	Chevy	RSD; 22	DAY	DAY	DAY	RCH	CAR	SVH	ATL	BRI	TAL	NWS	CLB	DAR	BLV	LGY	CLT	SMR	MAR	MCH																																					51st	288	
1970	Mike Ober	02	Plymouth																				RSD; 25	HCY	KPT	GPS	DAY	AST	TPN	TRN	BRI; 24	SMR; 6	NSV; 21	ATL; 19	CLB	ONA	MCH	TAL	BGS	SBO	DAR	HCY	RCH	DOV	NCF	NWS	CLT	MAR	MGR	CAR	LGY								51st	288	

==== Winston Cup Series ====
NASCAR Winston Cup Series results
Year	Team	No.	Make	1	2	3	4	5	6	7	8	9	10	11	12	13	14	15	16	17	18	19	20	21	22	23	24	25	26	27	28	29	30	31	32	33	34	35	36	37	38	39	40	41	42	43	44	45	46	47	48	NWCSC	Pts	Ref
1971	Mike Ober	02	Plymouth	RSD; 16	DAY	DAY	DAY																	CLT; 33	DOV	MCH	RSD; 39	HOU	GPS	DAY	BRI	AST	ISP	TRN	NSV	ATL	BGS	ONA	MCH	TAL	CLB	HCY	DAR	MAR	CLT	DOV	CAR	MGR	RCH	NWS	TWS	NA	NA	
1971	Mike Ober	2	Plymouth					ONT; 27	RCH	CAR	HCY	BRI	ATL	CLB	GPS	SMR	NWS	MAR	DAR	SBO	TAL	ASH	KPT																													NA	NA	
1972	Mike Ober	02	Plymouth	RSD; 13	DAY	RCH																																														59th	791.75	
1972	Mike Ober	02W	Plymouth				ONT; 18	CAR	ATL	BRI	DAR	NWS	MAR	TAL	CLT	DOV	MCH	RSD; 13	TWS	DAY	BRI	TRN	ATL	TAL	MCH	NSV	DAR	RCH	DOV	MAR	NWS	CLT	CAR	TWS																		59th	791.75	
1973	Mike Ober	02	Dodge	RSD; 17	DAY	RCH	CAR	BRI	ATL	NWS	DAR	MAR	TAL	NSV	CLT	DOV	TWS	RSD; 32	MCH	DAY	BRI	ATL	TAL	NSV	DAR	RCH	DOV	NWS	MAR	CLT	CAR																					75th	NA	
1974	Mike Ober	02W	Dodge	RSD	DAY	RCH	CAR	BRI	ATL	DAR	NWS	MAR	TAL	NSV	DOV	CLT	RSD; 30	MCH	DAY	BRI	NSV	ATL	POC	TAL	MCH	DAR	RCH	DOV	NWS	MAR	CLT	CAR	ONT																			90th	2.81	
1975	Marquardt Racing	26W	Chevy	RSD; 30	DAY	RCH	CAR	BRI	ATL	NWS	DAR	MAR	TAL	NSV	DOV	CLT	RSD	MCH	DAY	NSV	POC	TAL	MCH	DAR	DOV	NWS	MAR	CLT	RCH	CAR	BRI	ATL	ONT																			103rd	73	

==== Winston West Series ====
NASCAR Winston West Series results
Year	Team	No.	Make	1	2	3	4	5	6	7	8	9	10	11	12	13	14	15	16	17	18	19	20	21	22	23	24	25	26	27	28	29	30	NWWSC	Pts	Ref
1961	Bown Racing	61N	Chevy	ASP	HMS; 17																													NA	NA	
1961	Unknown	NA	Chevy			KEA; 10	ASP	RSD	ASP	ASP	ANS	ATS	BON	ASP	CSF	ANS	ASP																	NA	NA	
1962	Unknown	NA	Chevy	ASP	HMS; 18	ASP	GAR	SGS	GAR	BKS	ASP	CSF; 10	ASP																					20th	400	
1963	Bown Racing	61	Chevy	RSD; 19	ASP	RSD	SAL	SGS	TUC	MNP																								20th	464	
1963	Unknown	NA	Chevy								SMF; 2	MNP	RSD																					20th	464	
1964	Bown Racing	61	Plymouth	CSP	RSD	SJS; 17	POR			**EUG**; 1	CTR; 4		RAS; 14	ASP													**JBA**; 0†	ASP	ASP		CSF; 3	ASP; 1		4th	3122	
1964	Bown Racing	61N	Plymouth					EVG; 1	YAK; 5			**POR**; 14				SAL; 6	POR; 11	JBA; 3	EVG	SGS; 2	BKS	ASP	OIR	ASP	GHR; 9	SWF; 2				POR; 15				4th	3122	
1964	Bown Racing	NA	Unknown												TAC; 2																			4th	3122	
1965	Bown Racing	61N	Plymouth	BRS; 9		SJS; 8	ASP	POR; 2	EVG; 3	BRS	POR; 15	ASP	POR; 2	ASP	ASP	CSF; 14	ASP																	12th	1288	
1965	Bown Racing	611	Plymouth		RSD; 27																													12th	1288	
1966	Mike Ober	61	Plymouth	RSD	S99	ASP	ASP	DCS; 12	POR; 17	ASP	OSS	VAL	S99	ASP	AMP	POR; 18	SGV	CSF; DNQ																NA	NA	
1968	Mike Ober	61	Chevy	RSD	ASP	KEA	VAL	ASP	AMP	DCS	POR	EVG	EUG	MED	OSS	TCR; 8	YAK	EVG	EUR	BKS	S99	CSP	SGS											NA	NA	
1969	Mike Ober	61	Chevy	RSD; 12	CSF; 13	SGV; 19	SON; 20	EVG	**TCR**; 8	YAK; 2	DCS; 11	SAL; 5	JBA; 1	OSS; 6	SGS; 12	SON; 7	YAK; 3	EVG; 0†	CPR; 2	POR; 4	SMS													7th	804	
1969	Mike Ober	61n	Chevy																			SGV; 25	TWS											7th	804	
1970	Mike Ober	61	Chevy	RSD; 22																														6th	922	
1970	Mike Ober	61	Plymouth		ASP; 12																													6th	922	
1970	Mike Ober	02	Plymouth			SGB; 17	CSF; 5	RSD; 25	YAK; 18	**EVG**; 1*	JBA; 5	CRS	**OSS**; 3	**SGS**; 1*	MED; 6	SAL; 1*	SPS; 1*	TCR; 12	**WSP**; 1*	S99; 1*	ASP; 21	SGB; 2												6th	922	
1971	Mike Ober	02	Plymouth	RSD; 16		OSS; 10	SJS; 17	CRS; 12	S99; 20	ASP	RSD; 39	SAL; 2	SPS; 18	SKA; 3	USP; 6	POR; 19	LSP	MED	DCS	CRS	OSS	SGS	BKS	CSP	EVG; 17	IFS; 19	YAK	SGB	TWS					13th	631	
1971	Mike Ober	2	Plymouth		ONT; 27																													13th	631	
1972	Mike Ober	02	Plymouth	RSD; 13		SJS; 2	S99; 1*	SMN; 2*	TCR; 2	YAK; 10	EVG; 3		MED; 5	POR; 2	IFS; 9	MER; 4	SPS; 3	LSP; 10	WSP; 1*	SKA; 5	RAS; 2	CRS; 2	OSS; 3	SGS; 2			EVG; 17	USP; 18	**YAK**; 16*	POR; 7	ASP; 1*	WCR; 3	SMN; 6	3rd	2665	
1972	Mike Ober	2W	Plymouth		ONT; 18																													3rd	2665	
1972	Mike Ober	02W	Plymouth									RSD; 13																						3rd	2665	
1972	Bown Racing	27	Plymouth																						CSP; 3	BKS; 21								3rd	2665	
1973	Mike Ober	02	Dodge	AMP; 2	MAD; 11	S99; 3	AUR; 11	KFS; 2	CBS; 6	USP; 2	POR; 9	SPS; 2	WER; 3	SGS; 2	CAJ; 1	OSS; 3	CSP; 9	BKS; 2	LAG; 24	EVG; 14			POR; 15											4th	1604.25	
1973	Mike Ober	02	Plymouth																		WSP; 3	YAK; 4		AMP; DNQ										4th	1604.25	
1973	Ernie Conn	7	Dodge																					AMP; 8*										4th	1604.25	
1974	Mike Ober	2W	Dodge	RSD	AMP	S99	MSP	COR	SBP	ASP	RSD; 30	WER	WSP	SPS	STA	USP	POR	MED	EUG	CBS	CAJ	CRS	ASP	AMP	CSP	EVG	YAK	POR	SGB	ASP	ONT			NA	NA	
1975	Marquardt Racing	26	Chevy	RSD; 30	LAG	MSP	ASP	RSD	ASP	USP	POR	EVG	SMS	CRS	CSP	ASP	EVG	YAK	POR	MSP	ONT													NA	33	

† - It is known Bown participated in these races, but his final position is unknown.
