= Bob England (racing driver) =

American racing driver (1935–1985)

- Born: January 29, 1935; Daly City, California, U.S.
- Died: December 12, 1985 (aged 50)

NASCAR Cup Series career
- 7 races run over 3 years
- Best finish: 112th (1970)
- First race: 1969 Motor Trend 500 (Riverside)
- Last race: 1971 Texas 500 (Texas World)
Wins	Top tens	Poles
0	0	0

ARCA Menards Series West career
- 91 races run over 7 years
- Best finish: 4th (1970, 1971)
- First race: 1968 Race 2 (Ascot Park)
- Last race: 1974 Livermore 100 (Altamont)
Wins	Top tens	Poles
0	31	0
- Statistics up to date as of August 18, 2026.

Bob England (January 29, 1935 – December 12, 1985) was an American professional stock car racing driver. He competed in the NASCAR Winston Cup Series and NASCAR Winston West Series between 1968 and 1974.

== Racing career ==
England began competing in NASCAR in 1968, making his NASCAR Pacific Coast Late Model Division debut at Ascot Park, where he finished 11th; in nine other attempts, he scored five top-ten finishes and failed to qualify at Orange Show Speedway.

England would make 15 starts in 1969, scoring seven top-ten finishes. In running these races, England made his NASCAR Grand National Series debut in the Motor Trend 500 at Riverside International Raceway, where he finished last in the 44 car field after retiring with engine issues after just one lap.

England competed full-time in the renamed Grand National West in 1970, scoring eight top-tens in the season's 19 races. He finished fourth in the standings. This schedule included two combination races at Riverside, where he retired after three laps with transmission issues and finished 43rd in the season opener and finished 13th in the second Riverside race after rear end issues caused him to retire 123 laps into the event.

England competed full-time again in the renamed Winston West Series in 1971, running all 26 races and scoring eleven top-tens. This schedule included four combination races with the renamed Winston Cup Series; England finished thirteenth in the first Riverside race, 41st at Ontario Motor Speedway, a career-best twelfth in the second Riverside race, and 29th in his final Winston Cup start at Texas World Speedway.

England reduced his Winston West schedule to fifteen races in 1972, failing to qualify for the first two races of the season, combination races with the Winston Cup Series and his final career Cup attempts, and failing to finish inside the top-ten.

England made six Winston West starts in 1973, only finishing two of them.

England would make his final three NASCAR starts in 1974, ending his career with an eighteenth place finish at Altamont Speedway.

== Motorsports career results ==
=== NASCAR ===
(key) (Bold – Pole position awarded by qualifying time. Italics – Pole position earned by points standings or practice time. * – Most laps led.)

==== Grand National Series ====
NASCAR Grand National Series results
Year	Team	No.	Make	1	2	3	4	5	6	7	8	9	10	11	12	13	14	15	16	17	18	19	20	21	22	23	24	25	26	27	28	29	30	31	32	33	34	35	36	37	38	39	40	41	42	43	44	45	46	47	48	49	50	51	52	53	54	NGNC	Pts	Ref
1969	England Racing	8	Chevy	MGR	MGY	RSD; 44	DAY	DAY	DAY	CAR	AUG	BRI	ATL	CLB	HCY	GPS	RCH	NWS	MAR	AWS	DAR	BLV	LGY	CLT	MGR	SMR	MCH	KPT	GPS	NCF	DAY	DOV	TPN	TRN	BLV	BRI	NSV	SMR	ATL	MCH	SBO	BGS	AWS	DAR	HCY	RCH	TAL	CLB	MAR	NWS	CLT	SVH	AUG	CAR	JFC	MGR	TWS	NA	NA	
1970	England Racing	80	Chevy	RSD; 43	DAY	DAY	DAY	RCH	CAR	SVH	ATL	BRI	TAL	NWS	CLB	DAR	BLV	LGY	CLT	SMR	MAR	MCH																																				112th	24	
1970	England Racing	8	Chevy																				RSD; 13	HCY	KPT	GPS	DAY	AST	TPN	TRN	BRI	SMR	NSV	ATL	CLB	ONA	MCH	TAL	BGS	SBO	DAR	HCY	RCH	DOV	NCF	NWS	CLT	MAR	MGR	CAR	LGY							112th	24	
1971	England Racing	18	Chevy	RSD; 13	DAY	DAY	DAY																				RSD; 12	HOU	GPS	DAY	BRI	AST	ISP	TRN	NSV	ATL	BGS	ONA	MCH	TAL	CLB	HCY	DAR	MAR	CLT	DOV	CAR	MGR	RCH	NWS								NA	NA	
1971	England Racing	81	Chevy					ONT; 41	RCH	CAR	HCY	BRI	ATL	CLB	GPS	SMR	NWS	MAR	DAR	SBO	TAL	ASH	KPT	CLT	DOV	MCH																									TWS; 29							NA	NA	

==== Winston Cup Series ====
NASCAR Winston Cup Series results
Year	Team	No.	Make	1	2	3	4	5	6	7	8	9	10	11	12	13	14	15	16	17	18	19	20	21	22	23	24	25	26	27	28	29	30	31	NWCC	Pts	Ref
1972	England Racing	8W	Chevy	RSD; DNQ	DAY	RCH	ONT; DNQ	CAR	ATL	BRI	DAR	NWS	MAR	TAL	CLT	DOV	MCH	RSD	TWS	DAY	BRI	TRN	ATL	TAL	MCH	NSV	DAR	RCH	DOV	MAR	NWS	CLT	CAR	TWS	NA	0	

==== Winston West Series ====
NASCAR Winston West Series results
Year	Team	No.	Make	1	2	3	4	5	6	7	8	9	10	11	12	13	14	15	16	17	18	19	20	21	22	23	24	25	26	27	28	29	30	NWWC	Pts	Ref
1968	England Racing	8	Chevy	RSD	ASP; 11	KEA; 8	VAL; 7	ASP; 11	AMP	DCS; 21	POR	EVG	EUG	MED	OSS; DNQ	TCR	YAK	EVG	EUR; 5	BKS	S99; 15	CSP; 10	SGS; 9											14th	491	
1969	England Racing	8	Chevy	RSD; 44	CSF; 8	SGV; 7	SON; 8	EVG	TCR; 18	YAK; 17	DCS; 12	SAL; 8	JBA; 12	OSS	SGS; 10	SON; 25	YAK	EVG	CPR; 9	POR; 11	SMS; 7	SGV; 11	TWS											9th	768	
1970	England Racing	80	Chevy	RSD; 43					YAK; 11		JBA; 10	CRS; 8	OSS; 15	SGS; 16			SPS; 10		WSP; 8	S99; 13	ASP; 13													4th	934	
1970	England Racing	8	Chevy		ASP; 7	SGB; 8	CSF; 10	RSD; 13		EVG; 15					MED; 14	SAL; 11		TCR; 6				SGB; 12												4th	934	
1971	England Racing	18	Chevy	RSD; 13							RSD; 12																							4th	1224	
1971	England Racing	81	Chevy		ONT; 41																								TWS; 29					4th	1224	
1971	England Racing	8	Chevy			OSS; 6	SJS; 5	CRS; 7	S99; 10	ASP; 8		SAL; 14	SPS; 17	SKA; 12		POR; 15	LSP; 12	MED; 9	DCS; 12	CRS; 16	OSS; DNQ	SGS; 11	BKS; 8	CSP; 7	EVG; 5	IFS; 9	YAK; 13	SGB; 12						4th	1224	
1971	England Racing	8	Plymouth												USP; 11																			4th	1224	
1971	Bob Clough	1	Ford																		OSS; 6													4th	1224	
1972	England Racing	8W	Chevy	RSD; DNQ	ONT; DNQ																													24th	509.25	
1972	England Racing	78	Chevy			SJS; 25	S99																		CSP; 15	BKS; 15	EVG; 14	USP; 16	YAK; 25				SMN; 15	24th	509.25	
1972	England Racing	8	Chevy					SMN; 14	TCR	YAK	EVG	RSD	MED; 16	POR; 16	IFS	MER	SPS; 14	LSP; 14	WSP	SKA	RAS	CRS	OSS	SGS										24th	509.25	
1972	Unknown	3	Dodge																											POR; 12	ASP	WCR		24th	509.25	
1973	England Racing	58	Chevy	AMP; 19																														31st	242.25	
1973	England Racing	8	Chevy		MAD; 16	S99; 15	AUR	KFS	CBS	USP	POR	SPS	WER	SGS	CAJ	OSS	CSP	BKS	LAG					AMP; 20										31st	242.25	
1973	England Racing	0	Chevy																	EVG; 33	WSP	YAK	POR; 24											31st	242.25	
1974	England Racing	8	Chevy	RSD	AMP; 14	S99; 14	MSP	COR	SBP	ASP	RSD	WER	WSP	SPS	STA	USP	POR	MED	EUG	CBS	CAJ	CRS	ASP	AMP; 18	CSP	EVG	YAK	POR	SGB	ASP	ONT			47th	149.75	
