= Marty Kinerk =

American racing driver (1940–2012)

- Born: Daniel Martin Kinerk; April 19, 1940; Tucson, Arizona, U.S.
- Died: September 19, 2012 (aged 72); Tucson, Arizona, U.S.

NASCAR Cup Series career
- 2 races run over 2 years
- Best finish: N/A
- First race: 1969 Motor Trend 500 (Riverside)
- Last race: 1971 Miller High Life 500 (Ontario)
| Wins | Top tens | Poles |
|---|---|---|
| 0 | 0 | 0 |

ARCA Menards Series West career
- 23 races run over 4 years
- Best finish: 3rd (1969)
- First race: 1968 Race 2 (Gardena)
- Last race: 1971 Race 4 (San Jose)
- First win: 1969 Sacramento 100 (Sacramento)
- Last win: 1969 Santa Maria 150 (Santa Maria)
| Wins | Top tens | Poles |
|---|---|---|
| 3 | 17 | 1 |
- Statistics up to date as of September 1, 2026.

Daniel Martin "Marty" Kinerk (April 19, 1940 – September 19, 2012) was an American professional stock car racing driver. He primarily competed in the NASCAR Winston West Series, racing between 1969 and 1971.

== Racing career ==
Kinerk began building his own cars with his friends in high school and soon started racing them, finishing second in his first race. In 1963, he began racing roadsters on dirt tracks in Arizona under the tutelage of Roger McCluskey before switching to supermodified cars and winning 1964 Arizona State Rookie of the Year. In late 1966, Kinerk traveled to South Africa to race his supermodified, where he would win 62 of 70 races in Johannesburg and Durban over two years and scored consecutive South African Sprint Car Championship titles before returning to the United States in 1968. He made his NASCAR Pacific Coast Late Model Division debut at Ascot Park, finishing fifth. He also made his USAC Stock Car Series debut on Phoenix International Raceway's road course, finishing 14th. Kinkerk won the 1968 Late Model Stock Car Championship at Manzanita Speedway. In 1969, Kinerk competed full-time in the Pacific Coast Late Model Division, only skipping the combination race with the NASCAR Grand National Series at Texas World Speedway; in 19 races, Kinerk scored three wins and sixteen top-tens, including 12 top-fives. In the combination race at Riverside International Raceway, he would finish 34th due to transmission issues. Kinerk made one start in the renamed Grand National West in 1970, finishing 13th at Orange Show Speedway for fellow driver Kevin Terris. Kinerk made his final starts in the renamed Winston West Series in 1971, finishing 34th at Ontario Motor Speedway in a combination race with the renamed Winston Cup Series and 20th at San Jose Speedway after retiring with engine issues after one lap.

=== Career-ending crash ===
On June 10, 1972, Kinerk was competing in a sprint car race at Manzanita Speedway when his tire caught a rut in the track, sending the car flipping over a fence, where it landed on top of a Ford Thunderbird in the parking lot. According to his brother Burt, the car disintegrated and Marty shouldn't have survived; he suffered a traumatic concussion from the accident and also became bipolar and dependent on medication. His career ultimately ended due to the wreck, ending with over 75 total victories.

== Personal life ==
Kinerk was born to Daniel and Ann Kinerk on April 19, 1940. He graduated from Salpointe Catholic High School and attended the University of Arizona and Northern Arizona University. Following his racing career, Kinerk worked in industrial construction until a back injury from a work accident in 1986 left him disabled for the remainder of his life.

== Death ==
Kinerk died in Tucson on September 19, 2012, following a long-term illness.

== Motorsports career results ==
=== NASCAR ===
(key) (Bold – Pole position awarded by qualifying time. Italics – Pole position earned by points standings or practice time. * – Most laps led.)

==== Grand National Series ====
NASCAR Grand National Series results
| Year | Team | No. | Make | 1 | 2 | 3 | 4 | 5 | 6 | 7 | 8 | 9 | 10 | 11 | 12 | 13 | 14 | 15 | 16 | 17 | 18 | 19 | 20 | 21 | 22 | 23 | 24 | 25 | 26 | 27 | 28 | 29 | 30 | 31 | 32 | 33 | 34 | 35 | 36 | 37 | 38 | 39 | 40 | 41 | 42 | 43 | 44 | 45 | 46 | 47 | 48 | 49 | 50 | 51 | 52 | 53 | 54 | NGNSC | Pts | Ref |
|---|---|---|---|---|---|---|---|---|---|---|---|---|---|---|---|---|---|---|---|---|---|---|---|---|---|---|---|---|---|---|---|---|---|---|---|---|---|---|---|---|---|---|---|---|---|---|---|---|---|---|---|---|---|---|---|---|---|---|---|---|
| 1969 | Frank Townsend | 90 | Chevy | MGR | MGY | RSD; 34 | DAY | DAY | DAY | CAR | AUG | BRI | ATL | CLB | HCY | GPS | RCH | NWS | MAR | AWS | DAR | BLV | LGY | CLT | MGR | SMR | MCH | KPT | GPS | NCF | DAY | DOV | TPN | TRN | BLV | BRI | NSV | SMR | ATL | MCH | SBO | BGS | AWS | DAR | HCY | RCH | TAL | CLB | MAR | NWS | CLT | SVH | AUG | CAR | JFC | MGR | TWS | NA | NA | |
| 1971 | Sandy Sardin | 83 | Chevy | RSD | DAY | DAY | DAY | ONT; 34 | RCH | CAR | HCY | BRI | ATL | CLB | GPS | SMR | NWS | MAR | DAR | SBO | TAL | ASH | KPT | CLT | DOV | MCH | RSD | HOU | GPS | DAY | BRI | AST | ISP | TRN | NSV | ATL | BGS | ONA | MCH | TAL | CLB | HCY | DAR | MAR | CLT | DOV | CAR | MGR | RCH | NWS | TWS | | | | | | | NA | NA | |

==== Winston West Series ====
NASCAR Winston West Series results
| Year | Team | No. | Make | 1 | 2 | 3 | 4 | 5 | 6 | 7 | 8 | 9 | 10 | 11 | 12 | 13 | 14 | 15 | 16 | 17 | 18 | 19 | 20 | 21 | 22 | 23 | 24 | 25 | 26 | NWWSC | Pts | Ref |
|---|---|---|---|---|---|---|---|---|---|---|---|---|---|---|---|---|---|---|---|---|---|---|---|---|---|---|---|---|---|---|---|---|
| 1968 | Frank Townsend | 90 | Chevy | RSD | ASP; 5 | KEA | VAL | ASP | AMP | DCS | POR | EVG | EUG | MED | OSS | TCR | YAK | EVG | EUR | BKS | S99 | CSP | SGS | | | | | | | NA | NA | |
| 1969 | Frank Townsend | 90 | Chevy | RSD; 34 | CSF; 1 | SGV; 5 | SON; 3 | **EVG**; 3 | TCR; 3 | YAK; 9 | DCS; 7 | SAL; 3 | JBA; 7 | | SGS; 4 | | YAK; 4 | EVG; 5 | CPR; 1 | POR; 7 | SMS; 1 | SGV; 21 | TWS | | | | | | | 3rd | 1014 | |
| 1969 | Frank Townsend | 90 | Ford | | | | | | | | | | | OSS; 4 | | | | | | | | | | | | | | | | 3rd | 1014 | |
| 1969 | Glen Dorrity | 15 | Chevy | | | | | | | | | | | | | SON; 18 | | | | | | | | | | | | | | 3rd | 1014 | |
| 1970 | Kevin Terris | 34 | Plymouth | RSD | ASP | SGB | CSF | RSD | YAK | EVG | JBA | CRS | OSS; 13 | SGS | MED | SAL | SPS | TCR | WSP | S99 | ASP | SGB | | | | | | | | NA | NA | |
| 1971 | Sandy Sardin | 83 | Chevy | RSD | ONT; 34 | OSS | SJS; 20 | CRS | S99 | ASP | RSD | SAL | SPS | SKA | USP | POR | LSP | MED | DCS | CRS | OSS | SGS | BKS | CSP | EVG | IFS | YAK | SGB | TWS | NA | NA | |
