= 1969 Motor Trend 500 =

Auto race held at Riverside International Raceway in 1969

Race details
- Race 3 of 54 in the 1969 NASCAR Grand National Series season Race 1 of 20 in the 1969 NASCAR Pacific Coast Late Model Division season
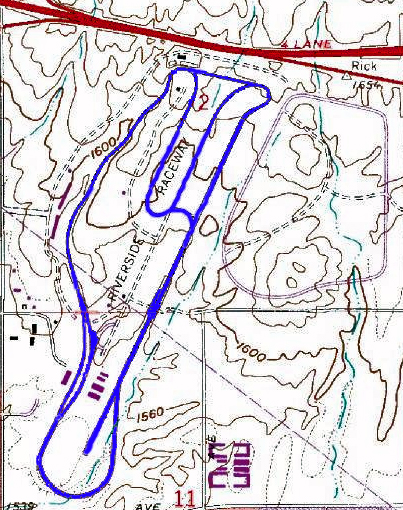
- Layout of Riverside International Raceway (1969-1988 version)
- Date: February 1, 1969
- Official name: Motor Trend 500
- Location: Riverside International Raceway, Riverside, California
- Course: Permanent racing facility
- Course length: 2.700 miles (4.345 km)
- Distance: 186 laps, 502 mi (808 km)
- Weather: Temperatures of 55.9 °F (13.3 °C); wind speeds of 9.9 miles per hour (15.9 km/h)
- Average speed: 110.323 miles per hour (177.548 km/h)
- Attendance: 46,300

Pole position
Driver	A. J. Foyt	Jack Bowsher & Associates
- Time: 88.07 seconds

Most laps led
Driver	Richard Petty	Petty Enterprises
- Laps: 103

Winner
No. 43	Richard Petty	Petty Enterprises

Television in the United States
- Network: Untelevised
- Announcers: None

The 1969 Motor Trend 500 was a NASCAR Grand National Series event that was held on February 1, 1969, at Riverside International Raceway in Riverside, California.

The transition to purpose-built racecars began in the early 1960s and occurred gradually over that decade. Changes made to the sport by the late 1960s brought an end to the "strictly stock" vehicles of the 1950s.

The Permatex 200 for sportsman cars was run as a companion event. The winner after a ten year break from motorsports was Hershel McGriff, second was Ron Grable, followed by Clem Proctor, J.R. Skinner and Vic Irvan, with Ron Hornaday Sr. sixth.

== Race report ==
One hundred and eighty-six laps were done on a paved road course spanning 2.7 miles (4.3 km). Although A. J. Foyt won the pole position with a qualifying speed of 110.323 miles per hour (177.548 km/h), Richard Petty would win the race, beating Foyt by 25 seconds driving a 1969 Ford Torino. This was the first time Petty won a race in any car other than a Plymouth and the first time he ran a Cup race in any car but a Plymouth since he switched to the Mopar brand from Oldsmobile near the end of 1959.

More than forty-six thousand fans would watch 44 vehicles start and only 13 finish the race. Most of the DNFs were caused by engine issues. Ford vehicles and Chevrolet vehicles made up most of the starting grid. Other notable drivers included: LeeRoy Yarbrough, Ray Elder, Neil Castles, Mario Andretti (his final start), and Elmo Langley. Al Unser would get his last top-five finish at this event, he wouldn't make another NASCAR Grand National Series start until 1986. Engine reliability was awful during this race, approximately 25% of the racing grid was afflicted with engine failures and mechanical issues.

Notable crew chiefs at the race were Harry Hyde, Dale Inman, Glen Wood, and Jake Elder.

West Coast racer Marty Kinerk made his top NASCAR Series debut at this event.

The entire race was completed under the green flag without any laps being taken for either yellow or red flags; with the final race to go the entire distance without a caution was the 2002 EA Sports 500. Average speeds for the entire race approached 105.498 miles per hour (169.783 km/h) and the duration of the race was four hours, forty-five minutes, and thirty-seven seconds. The race's top prize would be $19,650 in American dollars ($172,517 when adjusted for inflation). The overall winnings of this race would be $79,660 in American dollars ($699,374 when adjusted for inflation).

While individual owners would make up the majority of the NASCAR teams during this era, multi-car teams like Holman Moody, Wood Brothers Racing, and K&K Insurance Racing began to emerge during the late 1960s and early 1970s.

=== Qualifying ===
Grid	No.	Driver	Manufacturer	Owner
1	1	A. J. Foyt	'69 Ford	Jack Bowsher
2	98	LeeRoy Yarbrough	'69 Mercury	Junior Johnson
3	121	Dan Gurney	'69 Mercury	Wood Brothers
4	43	Richard Petty	'69 Ford	Petty Enterprises
5	17	David Pearson	'69 Ford	Holman-Moody
6	41	Al Unser	'69 Dodge	Rudy Hoerr
7	97	Mario Andretti	'69 Ford	Holman-Moody
8	71	Bobby Isaac	'69 Dodge	Nord Krauskopf
9	12	Roger McCluskey	'69 Plymouth	Norm Nelson
10	11	Parnelli Jones	'69 Ford	Holman-Moody

== Finishing order ==
Section reference:

1. Richard Petty
2. A. J. Foyt
3. David Pearson
4. Al Unser
5. James Hylton
6. LeeRoy Yarbrough*
7. Ray Elder
8. Scott Cain
9. John Sears
10. Harold Hardesty
11. Ray Johnstone
12. Dick Bown
13. Neil Castles
14. Henley Gray
15. Bobby Allison*
16. Ranny Dodd*
17. Marvin Sjolin
18. Mario Andretti*
19. Elmo Langley*
20. Paul Dorrity*
21. Don Tarr*
22. Roger McCluskey*
23. Wendell Parnell*
24. Cale Yarborough*
25. Frank Burnett*
26. Dan Gurney*
27. Sam Rose*
28. Robert Link*
29. J.D. McDuffie*
30. Cliff Garner*
31. Jerry Oliver*
32. Ralph Arnold*
33. Don White*
34. Marty Kinerk*
35. Jack McCoy*
36. Robert Hale*
37. Parnelli Jones*
38. Bobby Isaac*
39. Guy Jones*
40. Dave James*
41. Joe Frasson*
42. Jim Cook*
43. Johnny Steele*
44. Bob England*

* Driver failed to finish race

== Timeline ==
Section reference:

- Start of race: A.J. Foyt had the pole position to begin the event.
- Lap 28: LeeRoy Yarbrough took over the lead from A.J. Foyt.
- Lap 29: Mario Andretti took over the lead from LeeRoy Yarbrough.
- Lap 32: A.J. Foyt took over the lead from Mario Andretti.
- Lap 41: Don White blew his vehicle's engine while racing at high speeds.
- Lap 43: Ralph Arnold blew his vehicle's engine while racing at high speeds.
- Lap 48: Cliff Garner blew his vehicle's engine while racing at high speeds.
- Lap 50: J.D. McDuffie blew his vehicle's engine while racing at high speeds.
- Lap 51: LeeRoy Yarbrough took over the lead from A.J. Foyt.
- Lap 58: Mario Andretti took over the lead from LeeRoy Yarbrough.
- Lap 62: A.J. Foyt took over the lead from Mario Andretti.
- Lap 65: Sam Rose managed to lose the rear end of his vehicle.
- Lap 66: Dan Gurney blew his vehicle's engine while racing at high speeds.
- Lap 78: Richard Petty took over the lead from A.J. Foyt.
- Lap 80: Frank Burnett managed to ruin his vehicle's transmission.
- Lap 81: Cale Yarbrough blew his vehicle's engine while racing at high speeds.
- Lap 83: LeeRoy Yarbrough took over the lead from Richard Petty.
- Lap 87: Wendell Parnell blew his vehicle's engine while racing at high speeds.
- Lap 89: Richard Petty took over the lead from LeeRoy Yarbrough.
- Lap 100: Roger McCluskey managed to overheat his vehicle while he was driving.
- Lap 110: Don Tarr noticed that his vehicle's transmission stopped working.
- Lap 129: Paul Dorrity blew his vehicle's engine while racing at high speeds.
- Lap 131: Elmo Langley blew his vehicle's engine while racing at high speeds.
- Lap 132: Mario Andretti blew his vehicle's engine while racing at high speeds.
- Lap 143: Ranny Dodd managed to lose the rear end of his vehicle; causing him to leave the race due to safety reasons.
- Lap 151: Bobby Allison managed to lose the rear end of his vehicle; causing him to leave the race due to safety reasons.
- Lap 177: LeeRoy Yarbrough blew his vehicle's engine while racing at high speeds.
- Finish: Richard Petty was officially declared the winner of the event.

Preceded by 1968 Motor Trend 500	Motor Trend 500 races 1964-71	Succeeded by 1970 Motor Trend 500

Preceded by 1969 Alabama 200	NASCAR Grand National Series Season; 1969	Succeeded by 1969 Daytona 500

Preceded by 1969 Georgia 500	Richard Petty's Career Wins; 1960-1984	Succeeded by 1969 Virginia 500
