= Frank Burnett =

American racing driver (1931–2020)

- Born: Joseph Franklin Burnett; July 22, 1931; Modesto, California, U.S.
- Died: December 17, 2020 (aged 89); Modesto, California, U.S.

NASCAR Cup Series career
- 3 races run over 3 years
- Best finish: 85th (1968)
- First race: 1967 Motor Trend 500 (Riverside)
- Last race: 1969 Motor Trend 500 (Riverside)
Wins	Top tens	Poles
0	0	0

ARCA Menards Series West career
- 50 races run over 9 years
- Best finish: 8th (1966)
- First race: 1965 San Jose 200 (San Jose)
- Last race: 1973 Livermore-Olympia 100 (Altamont)
Wins	Top tens	Poles
0	16	0
- Statistics up to date as of October 30, 2026.

Joseph Franklin Burnett (July 22, 1931 – December 17, 2020) was an American professional stock car racing driver. He competed in the NASCAR Winston Cup Series and NASCAR Winston West Series.

== Racing career ==
Burnett made his NASCAR Pacific Coast Late Model Division debut in 1965 at San Jose Speedway, finishing tenth despite a crash after 159 laps. He also made his USAC Stock Car Series debut at Marchbanks Speedway, finishing 27th.

Burnett ran twelve of fifteen Pacific Coast Late Model races in 1966, scoring five top-tens with a best finish of fifth at Stockton 99 Speedway. He finished eighth in the standings.

Burnett attempted nine races in 1967, failing to qualify at the Alameda County Fairgrounds and scoring one top-ten, a sixth-place finish in the season finale at Clovis Speedway. These starts included his NASCAR Grand National Series debut in a combination race at Riverside International Raceway, where he finished 30th due to engine issues.

In 1968, Burnett ran ten Pacific Coast Late Model races, finishing in the top-ten in seven of them with a career-best finish of third Ascot Park. He finished 17th in the combination race at Riverside due to a gas tank issue.

Burnett ran eight Pacific Coast Late Model races in 1969, scoring two top-tens with a best finish of seventh at Tri-City Raceway. In the combination race at Riverside, his final Grand National start, Burnett finished 25th due to transmission issues.

Burnett made five starts in the renamed Grand National West in 1970, scoring his lone top-ten of the season in his first start at the California State Fairgrounds Race Track. He failed to qualify for the season-opening combination race at Riverside. He also made his final USAC Stock Car appearances, finishing 25th at Sears Point Raceway due to an oil pump issue after six laps and failing to qualify for the following race at Phoenix International Raceway.

Burnett made two starts in the renamed Winston West Series in 1971, finishing seventeenth at Clovis due to overheating issues and eleventh at San Gabriel Valley Speedway. He failed to qualify for the combination race with the renamed Winston Cup Series at Ontario Motor Speedway.

In 1972, Burnett ran three Winston West races, failing to finish all three due to various mechanical problems; his best finish was 17th at the California State Fairgrounds. He failed to qualify for the combination race at Ontario.

Burnett made his final Winston West start in 1973, finishing 12th at Altamont Speedway. In his final Winston Cup attempt at Riverside, he failed to qualify.

== Personal life ==
Burnett was born to Althum Burnett and Muriel Burnett on July 22, 1931. He was married to Louise Burnett for 67 years up until his death in 2020. The couple had a daughter, Barbara.
