= 1969 NASCAR Pacific Coast Late Model Division =

16th season of the NASCAR Pacific Coast Late Model Division

Seasons
- ← 1968 1970 →

The 1969 NASCAR Pacific Coast Late Model Division was the 16th season of the series and the final with the Pacific Coast Late Model Division name. The title was won by Ray Elder, his first in the series.

== Schedule and results ==
The 1969 season included 20 individual races, although San Gabriel Valley Speedway, Sears Point International Raceway, Evergreen Speedway, and Yakima Speedway hosted two races each. The race at Riverside International Raceway and the race at Texas World Speedway were in combination with the NASCAR Grand National Series.

Date	Name	Racetrack	Location	Winner
February 1	Motor Trend 500	Riverside International Raceway	Riverside, California	Richard Petty
April 27	Sacramento 100	California State Fairgrounds	Sacramento, California	Marty Kinerk
May 30	San Gabriel Valley 100	San Gabriel Valley Speedway	Irwindale, California	Jack McCoy
June 8	Weibel 150	Sears Point International Raceway	Sonoma, California	Ray Elder
July 4	Independence Day 100	Evergreen Speedway	Monroe, Washington	Scotty Cain
July 5	†	Tri-City Raceway	West Richland, Washington	Jim Cook
July 6	†	Yakima Speedway	Yakima, Washington	Jack McCoy
July 11	†	Douglas County Speedway	Roseburg, Oregon	Jack McCoy
July 12	†	Salem Speedway	Salem, Oregon	Jack McCoy
July 13	Jantzen Beach Party 150	Jantzen Beach Arena	Portland, Oregon	Dick Bown
July 26	Orange Show 150	Orange Show Speedway	San Bernardino, California	Jack McCoy
August 2	†	Saugus Speedway	Saugus, California	Jack McCoy
August 10	Sta-Power 150	Sears Point International Raceway	Sonoma, California	Jack McCoy
August 31	†	Yakima Speedway	Yakima, Washington	Jack McCoy
September 1	†	Evergreen Speedway	Monroe, Washington	Jack McCoy
September 6	Klamath Falls 100	Community Park Raceway	Klamath Falls, Oregon	Marty Kinerk
September 17	†	Portland Speedway	Portland, Oregon	Scotty Cain
September 20	Santa Maria 150	Santa Maria Speedway	Santa Maria, California	Marty Kinerk
October 11	†	San Gabriel Valley Speedway	Irwindale, California	Ray Elder
December 7	Texas 500	Texas World Speedway	College Station, Texas	Bobby Isaac

† This race was not given a name

== Full Drivers' Championship ==
(key) Bold – Pole position awarded by time. Italics – Pole position set by owner's points. * – Most laps led. † – Finishing position unknown

Pos	Driver	RSD	CSF	SGV	SON	EVG	TCR	YAK	DCS	SAL	JBA	OSS	SGS	SON	YAK	EVG	CPR	POR	SMS	SGV	TWS	Pts
1	Ray Elder	7	**5**	**18**	**1***	4	13	12	4*	2	**2***	2	2	**11***	9	3	**8***	**2***	4	**1***	6	1060
2	Jack McCoy	35	18	1*	9	0†	2	**1***	**1**	**1***	4	**1**	**1**	1	**1***	**1***	10	10	**14***	5	7	1022
3	Marty Kinerk	34	1	5	3	**3**	3	9	7	3	7	4	4	18	4	5	1	7	1	21		1014
4	Jim Cook	42	2	12	2	2	1*	5	5	4	6	3*	8	21	6	8	15	5	10	3		972
5	Scotty Cain	8	4	21	24	1	15	15	14	12	5	10	6	10	2	0†	12	1	2	8		944
6	Johnny Steele	43	12	6	19		11	8	2	7	8	5	5	5	7	4	3	3	13	22		932
7	Dick Bown	12	13	19	20		**8**	2	11	5	1	6	12	7	3	0†	2	4		25		804
8	Kevin Terris		25	20	11		14	19	9	6	15			3			4	8	16	10		774
9	Bob England	44	8	7	8		18	17	12	8	12		10	25			9	11	7	11		768
10	Jerry Oliver	31	19	10	18		5	16	6	15	11	11	16	14	11	0†						726
11	Sam Rose	27	22	14	25		6	10	17	11	10	8	18	15	10		16	20	17	19		696
12	Ranny Dodd	16	7	4	22								14	6					5	4		670
13	Pat Fay								19	9	9			24		7	7		11	17		626
14	Don Noel		17*	2	7	5	4	3	10	14	3	9	7	20			17					615
15	Ed Brown		3		5	7		20	22					4				13				484
16	Paul Dorrity	20	15	3	12	0†										9	5	9		7		455
17	Steve Froines		11	8	13					25	DNQ			19								452
18	Frank Burnett	25	21	11	21		7	13	8	13												443
19	Marvin Sjolin	17	24	23	15	10				23	DNQ											440
20	Hank Dekker Jr.		23	9	6		16	11	13	17				16			DNQ					362
	Joe Clark				14	9	9	6		24	DNQ	7	3	2						12		
	Cliff Garner	30	6						20						5	2		6		23		
	Les Loeser Jr.		10	24	23								9	22					8	15		
	Bill Ferrier		DNQ	17			12	18	21		16								12	24		
	Dave James	40	DNQ		16									12	8	10	19					
	George Wiltshire		27		26					19	13						13	12		QL		
	Dave Alonzo		26	DNQ	17								15				20	18			22	
	Mike Mohr								16	10	DNQ			13			11	15				
	Don Walker					8	10	4		22												
	Carl Joiner								3	16	DNQ				14		14					
	Ernie Stierly					6			15	21	14											
	Glenn Francis		20											9					6	26		
	Ralph Arnold	32	14	15												6						
	Harold Hardesty	10							18									17				
	Fred Hunt		16	DNQ						18							18					
	Bo Reeder		28	16	10																	
	Frank Deiny												11*							2		
	Don Simkins																	14	3			
	Ray Johnstone	11	DNQ																	6		
	Chuck Barnett																		9	13		
	Fred Hay						17	14														
	Pat Patrick		9	22																		
	Les Cooper																		15	18		
	Hershel McGriff													23				16				
	Bill Bischoff									20	DNQ							19				
	Merle Brennan				4																	
	Bill Amick																6					
	Don Dowdy							7														
	Bob Edminson													8								
	Herb Hill																			9		
	Jack McIntosh					11																
	Bill Meyer			13																		
	Mike Bowers												13									
	John Soares Jr.																			14		
	Dick Appleby																			16		
	Ken Gandy													17								
	Frank James		DNQ										17									
	Don Brandt		DNQ		DNQ								19									
	Bill Butts																			20		
	John Langdon								23													
	Wendell Parnell	23																				
	Robert Hale	36																				
	Guy Jones	39																				
	Karl Hutcheson													DNQ								
	Bill Mohr																	DNQ				
