= Guy Jones =

Guy Jones may refer to:

- Guy Carleton Jones (1864–1950), 4th Canadian surgeon general
- Guy H. Jones (1911–1986), American politician and lawyer

== See also ==
- Guy Lloyd-Jones (born 1966), British chemist
- Guy Salisbury-Jones (1896–1985), British army officer
