= Cliff Garner =

American racing driver (1937–2010)

- Born: Clifford Garner; April 13, 1937; Culver City, California, U.S.
- Died: March 15, 2010 (aged 72)

NASCAR Cup Series career
- 4 races run over 4 years
- Best finish: 114th (1967)
- First race: 1966 Motor Trend 500 (Riverside)
- Last race: 1972 Miller High Life 500 (Ontario)
Wins	Top tens	Poles
0	0	0

ARCA Menards Series West career
- 66 races run over 8 years
- Best finish: 4th (1967)
- First race: 1964 Ascot 200 (Gardena)
- Last race: 1977 Winston Gardena 150 (Gardena)
- First win: 1967 Race 6 (Salem)
- Last win: 1967 Race 15 (Jantzen)
Wins	Top tens	Poles
3	44	5
- Statistics up to date as of September 24, 2026.

Clifford V. Garner (April 13, 1937 – March 15, 2010) was an American professional stock car racing driver. He competed in the NASCAR Winston Cup Series and NASCAR Winston West Series.

== Racing career ==
Garner debuted in the NASCAR Pacific Coast Late Model Division in 1964, finishing third in his debut at Ascot Park; he made at least three more starts, scoring another top-five at the same track.

Garner made at least ten starts in 1965, scoring at least six top-tens. He also competed in two USAC Stock Car Series races, finishing sixteenth at Ascot Park and eighteenth at Marchbanks Speedway.

Garner made twelve Pacific Coast Late Model starts in 1966, scoring eight top-tens. This included his NASCAR Grand National Series debut in a combination race at Riverside International Raceway, crashing out and finishing 27th.

Garner's best Pacific Coast Late Model Division season came in 1967, where he ran seventeen of nineteen races, scoring wins at Salem Speedway, Orange Show Speedway, and Jantzen Beach Arena, three poles, and fourteen top-tens. He finished 35th in the combination race at Riverside due to engine issues.

Garner ran fourteen Pacific Coast Late Model races in 1968, scoring two poles and ten top-tens.

Garner made seven starts in 1969, scoring four top-tens. In the combination race at Riverside, he finished 30th due to engine issues.

After not competing in 1970 and 1971, Garner ran the 1972 Miller High Life 500, a combination race with the renamed Winston West Series, his final start in the renamed Winston Cup Series, finishing sixteenth.

Garner made his final start in the Winston West Series in 1977, running just one lap at Ascot Park and finishing last in 23rd. He ran a NASCAR Late Model Sportsman National Championship at Riverside, finishing nineteenth.

Garner failed to qualify for two Western States Open Competition Series at Saugus Speedway and Mesa Marin Raceway in 1979.
