= 1972 Talladega 500 =

Auto race held at Talladega Superspeedway in 1972

Race details
- Race 21 of 31 in the 1972 NASCAR Winston Cup Series season
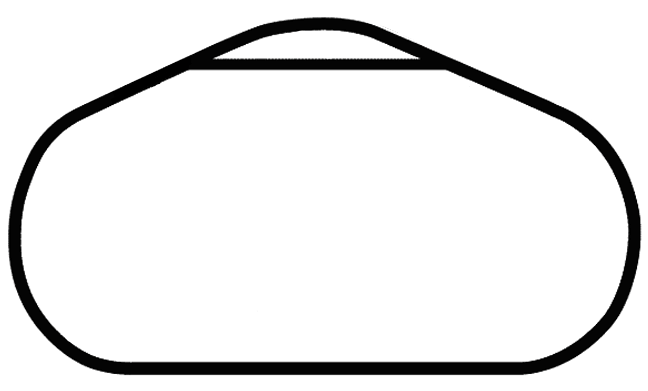
- Layout of Talladega Superspeedway
- Date: August 6, 1972
- Official name: Talladega 500
- Location: Alabama International Motor Speedway, Talladega, Alabama
- Course: Permanent racing facility
- Course length: 2.660 miles (4.280 km)
- Distance: 188 laps, 500.1 mi (804.8 km)
- Weather: Hot with temperatures of 87.1 °F (30.6 °C); wind speeds of 5.1 miles per hour (8.2 km/h)
- Average speed: 148.728 miles per hour (239.355 km/h)
- Attendance: 68,000

Pole position
Driver	Bobby Isaac	K&K Insurance Racing

Most laps led
Driver	James Hylton	James Hylton
- Laps: 106

Winner
No. 48	James Hylton	James Hylton

Television in the United States
- Network: untelevised
- Announcers: none

The 1972 Talladega 500 was a NASCAR Winston Cup Series race that took place on August 6, 1972, at Talladega Superspeedway in Talladega, Alabama.

== Background ==
Talladega Superspeedway, originally known as Alabama International Motor Superspeedway (AIMS), is a motorsports complex located north of Talladega, Alabama. It is located on the former Anniston Air Force Base in the small city of Lincoln. The track is a tri-oval and was constructed by International Speedway Corporation, a business controlled by the France Family, in the 1960s. Talladega is most known for its steep banking and the unique location of the start/finish line, located just past the exit to pit road. The track currently hosts the NASCAR series such as the Monster Energy Cup Series, Xfinity Series, and the Camping World Truck Series. Talladega Superspeedway is the longest NASCAR oval with a length of 2.66 miles (4.28 km), and the track at its peak had a seating capacity of 175,000 spectators.

== Race report ==
Bobby Isaac won the pole at a speed of 190.677 miles per hour (306.865 km/h). Taking place on August 6, 1972, at Talladega Superspeedway in Talladega, Alabama, the race took three hours and twenty-two minutes.

I was going with the old tire anyway.

— James Hylton

James Hylton won the race; collecting $24,865 ($191,383 when adjusted for inflation). This was a controversial race because NASCAR used treaded tires and it was disastrous for most teams. Hylton won because he didn't have the money to buy the new tires and used old nontreaded tires. Darrell Waltrip would lead his first laps of his NASCAR Winston Cup Series career.

The drivers who were using old tires had a huge advantage, Waltrip was one of them as was eventual winner James Hylton. Waltrip actually led 7 laps before his engine blew up. All was not bad for Waltrip who was short on funds at the time.

Many drivers were out of the race by lap 5 because of a big crash. By the day's end, only 18 cars finished the race and only two cars finished on the lead lap. On lap 188, Hylton and ARCA legend Ramo Stott battled to the finish. Hylton won the race by less than one second. Third-place finisher Bobby Allison was five laps down. It was Hylton's second and final win in NASCAR.

Notable crew chiefs at this race; Jake Elder, Harry Hyde, Dale Inman and Lee Gordon.

=== Qualifying ===
Grid	No.	Driver	Manufacturer	Owner
1	71	Bobby Isaac	'72 Dodge	Nord Krauskopf
2	21	David Pearson	'71 Mercury	Wood Brothers
3	43	Richard Petty	'72 Dodge	Petty Enterprises
4	11	Buddy Baker	'72 Dodge	Petty Enterprises
5	12	Bobby Allison	'72 Chevrolet	Richard Howard
6	18	Joe Frasson	'72 Dodge	Joe Frasson
7	9	Pete Hamilton	'72 Plymouth	Jack Housby
8	28	Fred Lorenzen	'72 Chevrolet	Hoss Ellington
9	14	Coo Coo Marlin	'72 Chevrolet	H.B. Cunningham
10	76	Ben Arnold	'71 Ford	Ben Arnold

== Top 10 finishers ==
Section reference:

1. James Hylton (No. 48), official time 3:22:09
2. Ramo Stott (No. 90), 1 car length down
3. Bobby Allison (No. 12), 5 laps down
4. Red Farmer (No. 97), 8 laps down
5. Buddy Arrington (No. 67), 9 laps down
6. Ben Arnold (No. 76), 10 laps down
7. Richard Petty (No. 43), 11 laps down
8. Henley Gray (No. 19), 13 laps down
9. Raymond Williams (No. 47), 15 laps down
10. Jim Hurtubise (No. 56), 17 laps down
