= 1970 World 600 =

Auto race run in North Carolina in 1970

Race details
- Race 16 of 48 in the 1970 NASCAR Grand National Series season
- Layout of Charlotte Motor Speedway
- Date: May 24, 1970
- Official name: World 600
- Location: Charlotte Motor Speedway, Concord, North Carolina
- Course: Permanent racing facility
- Course length: 1.500 miles (2.414 km)
- Distance: 400 laps, 600 mi (965 km)
- Weather: Temperatures of 84.9 °F (29.4 °C); wind speeds of 9.2 miles per hour (14.8 km/h)
- Average speed: 129.68 miles per hour (208.70 km/h)
- Attendance: 70,000

Pole position
- Driver: Bobby Isaac

Most laps led
- Driver: Donnie Allison
- Laps: 141

Winner
- No. 27: Donnie Allison

Television in the United States
- Network: ABC
- Announcers: Keith Jackson, Bob Montgomery, & Chris Economaki

The 1970 World 600 the 11th running of the event, was a NASCAR Grand National Series race held on May 24, 1970, at Charlotte Motor Speedway in Concord, North Carolina. Contested over 400 laps on the 1.5 mile (2.42 km) speedway, it was the 16th race of the 1970 NASCAR Grand National Series. Donnie Allison won the race.

Bugs Stevens made his official NASCAR debut in this race.

== Background ==
The race was held at Charlotte Motor Speedway, a 1.5-mile (2.4 km) quad-oval track located in Concord, North Carolina. The track's turns were banked at twenty-four degrees, while the front stretch, the location of the finish line, was five degrees. The back stretch, opposite of the front, also had a five degree banking. Charlotte Motor Speedway hosted the NASCAR Grand National Series twice during the 1970 season, with the other race being the National 500. The track opened for the inaugural World 600 in 1960, and was built by Bruton Smith and Curtis Turner. An estimated 70,000 spectators attended the race.

== Top 10 results ==
Pos	No.	Driver	Manufacturer
1	27	Donnie Allison	Ford
2	21	Cale Yarborough	Mercury
3	72	Benny Parsons	Ford
4	55	Tiny Lund	Dodge
5	48	James Hylton	Ford
6	36	Bugs Stevens	Plymouth
7	71	Bobby Isaac	Dodge
8	40	Pete Hamilton	Plymouth
9	49	G.C. Spencer	Plymouth
10	31	Jim Vandiver	Dodge

== Race Statistics ==
- Time of race: 4:37:36
- Average Speed: 129.68 miles per hour (208.70 km/h)
- Pole Speed: 159.277 miles per hour (256.331 km/h)
- Cautions: 10 for 66 laps
- Margin of Victory: 2 laps +
- Lead changes: 28
