= Norwood Arena Speedway =

Coordinates: 42.170173°N 71.191656°W

Norwood Arena Speedway was a 1/4-mile oval race track in Norwood, Massachusetts that operated between 1948 and 1972.

== History ==
The track was built in 1948 with the intention of dog racing coupled with parimutuel betting. When gambling was not approved for the county, the plans were scrapped. Despite this setback, the track was converted to auto racing which experienced tremendous growth following the end of the second World War. The track held one NASCAR Grand National Series event in 1961. Besides stock car racing, Norwood Arena Speedway featured midget and sports car racing, drag racing, and other sporting events between 1948 and 1972, when Norwood Arena Speedway closed at the end of stock car racing season.

The track hosted a variety of racing divisions during its 25-year run. This track was the most prominent in the Northeast circuit, and gave rise to notable drivers such as Bugsy Stevens, Leo Cleary, George Savary, Don MacTavish, and Pete Hamilton. MacTavish was an early success and poised for a tremendously successful career until he was tragically killed at Daytona in 1969. Hamilton, a peer of MacTavish and from the same racing clique in Needham, won the 1970 Daytona 500 driving the No. 40 Plymouth Superbird for the Richard Petty Enterprises race team.

More information can be found on the Norwood Arena Speedway historic web site www.norwoodarena.com.

== In popular culture ==
The history of the track is covered in a book title by former race car driver Lew Boyd, Hot Cars Cool Drivers, and in a 2014 independent documentary film, Norwood Arena Movie.
