= 1971 Yankee 400 =

Auto race held at Michigan International Speedway in 1971

Race details
- Race 36 of 48 in the 1971 NASCAR Winston Cup Series season
- 1971 Yankee 400 program cover
- Date: August 15, 1971
- Official name: Yankee 400
- Location: Michigan International Speedway, Brooklyn, Michigan
- Course: Permanent racing facility
- Course length: 2.040 miles (3.283 km)
- Distance: 197 laps, 401.880 mi (646.763 km)
- Weather: Warm with temperatures of 80.1 °F (26.7 °C); wind speeds of 10.1 miles per hour (16.3 km/h)
- Average speed: 149.862 miles per hour (241.180 km/h)
- Attendance: 26,000

Pole position
Driver	Pete Hamilton	Owens Racing

Most laps led
Driver	Bobby Allison	Holman Moody
- Laps: 155

Winner
No. 12	Bobby Allison	Holman Moody

The 1971 Yankee 400 was a NASCAR Winston Cup Series race that took place at Michigan International Speedway on August 15, 1971. The purse for this event was $51,015 ($405,562.96 when adjusted for inflation).

== Background ==
Michigan International Speedway is a four-turn superspeedway that is 2 miles (3.2 km) long. The track was originally built and owned by Lawrence H. LoPatin. Financing was arranged by Thomas W Itin. Its first race took place on Sunday, October 13, 1968, with the running of the USAC 250 mile Championship Car Race won by Ronnie Bucknum.

== Race report ==
There were 26,000 fans in attendance for this two hour, forty minute race in Brooklyn, Michigan There were two cautions for twelve laps and the victory margin was three seconds. Average speed was 149.862 miles (241.180 km) per hour while the pole speed was 161.901 miles (260.554 km) per hour. All forty competitors in this race were born in the United States of America. 197 laps were undertaken on the paved oval track spanning 2.04 miles (3.28 km).

Manufacturers involved in this race included Mercury, Ford, Dodge, Chevrolet, and Plymouth.

Friday Hassler blew his vehicle's engine on lap 7. Bobby Isaac had a problem with his vehicle's water pump on lap 11. Benny Parsons blew his engine on lap 29. Henley Gray's vehicle had a problematic suspension on lap 38. Fuel pump issues forced Ed Negre out of the race on lap 40. Dave Marcis overheated his vehicle on lap 45. Problems with the clutch caused John Sears to exit the race on lap 49. Coo Coo Marlin blew his vehicle's engine on lap 76. Dick May overheated his vehicle on lap 84.

Engine problems happened for Pete Hamilton on lap 87. Pete Hamilton had the only car that could possibly beat Bobby Allison; he would overtake Allison on laps 31, 40, 46, and 49 before losing dominance over Bobby Allison on lap 50. Problems with the vehicle's ignition forced Johnny Halford out of the race on lap 94. Bill Seifert's vehicle had a troublesome fuel pump on lap 110; forcing his early exit from the race. Dean Dalton had engine issues on lap 125 that forced him out of the race while Charlie Glotzbach dealt with the same issue on lap 129.

=== Qualifying ===
Grid	No.	Driver	Manufacturer
1	6	Pete Hamilton	'71 Plymouth
2	12	Bobby Allison	'69 Mercury
3	71	Bobby Isaac	'71 Dodge
4	3	Charlie Glotzbach	'71 Chevrolet
5	11	Buddy Baker	'71 Dodge
6	43	Richard Petty	'71 Plymouth
7	24	Cecil Gordon	'69 Mercury
8	72	Benny Parsons	'69 Mercury
9	25	Jabe Thomas	'70 Plymouth
10	60	Maynard Troyer	'69 Mercury
11	79	Frank Warren	'69 Dodge
12	64	Elmo Langley	'69 Mercury
13	39	Friday Hassler	'70 Chevrolet
14	88	Ron Keselowski	'70 Dodge
15	4	John Sears	'69 Dodge

== Finishing order ==
Section reference:

POS	ST	#	DRIVER	SPONSOR / OWNER	CAR	LAPS	MONEY	STATUS	LED
1	2	12	Bobby Allison	Coca-Cola (Holman-Moody Racing)	'69 Mercury	197	15395	running	155
2	6	43	Richard Petty	Petty Engineering (Petty Enterprises)	'71 Plymouth	197	7870	running	30
3	5	11	Buddy Baker	Petty Engineering (Petty Enterprises)	'71 Dodge	196	4700	running	0
4	10	60	Maynard Troyer	Nagle Racers (Joe Nagle)	'69 Mercury	193	2870	running	0
5	16	18	Joe Frasson	Mario Frasson Cement Co. (Joe Frasson)	'70 Dodge	192	2020	running	0
6	7	24	Cecil Gordon	American Jetway (Cecil Gordon)	'69 Mercury	190	1495	running	0
7	14	88	Ron Keselowski	Messina Trucking (Roger Lubinski)	'70 Dodge	189	1320	running	0
8	26	48	James Hylton	Hylton Engineering (James Hylton)	'69 Ford	188	1220	running	0
9	9	25	Jabe Thomas	Don Robertson	'70 Plymouth	187	1120	running	0
10	21	06	Neil Castles	Howard Furniture (Neil Castles)	'70 Dodge	186	1020	running	0
11	39	44	Tommy Gale	Giachetti Brothers (Richard Giachetti)	'70 Ford	185	1045	running	0
12	31	32	Marv Acton	Brooks Racing (Dick Brooks)	'70 Plymouth	184	1020	running	0
13	35	76	Ben Arnold	Motor's Ford (Ben Arnold)	'69 Ford	184	945	running	0
14	11	79	Frank Warren	Frank Warren	'69 Dodge	184	920	running	0
15	17	90	Bill Dennis	Truck Equipment (Junie Donlavey)	'69 Mercury	184	995	running	0
16	18	91	Richard D. Brown	McNab's Engineering (Junior Fields)	'71 Chevrolet	183	895	running	0
17	37	47	Raymond Williams	Williams Racing (Raymond Williams)	'71 Ford	183	850	running	0
18	29	70	J.D. McDuffie	Welter Construction (J.D. McDuffie)	'69 Mercury	183	840	running	0
19	28	77	Charlie Roberts	Rheem Auto (Charlie Roberts)	'70 Ford	181	825	running	0
20	33	30	Walter Ballard	Ballard Racing (Vic Ballard)	'71 Ford	181	810	running	0
21	12	64	Elmo Langley	Woodfield Motors (Elmo Langley)	'69 Mercury	180	795	running	0
22	22	0	George Altheide	National Car Care (George Altheide)	'70 Dodge	177	780	running	0
23	40	34	Wendell Scott	Brandywine Transportation (Wendell Scott)	'69 Ford	174	765	running	0
24	30	26	Earl Brooks	Virginia Motors (Earl Brooks)	'69 Ford	174	750	running	0
25	34	86	Bobby Mausgrover	Countryland Foods (Neil Castles)	'69 Dodge	167	760	running	0
26	20	10	Bill Champion	Bill Champion	'70 Ford	166	720	running	0
27	4	3	Charlie Glotzbach	Richard Howard	'71 Chevrolet	129	710	engine	5
28	27	7	Dean Dalton	Dalton Garage (Dean Dalton)	'69 Ford	125	700	engine	0
29	38	45	Bill Seifert	Garrett Motors (Bill Seifert)	'69 Ford	110	690	fuel pump	0
30	25	83	Johnny Halford		'69 Plymouth	94	680	ignition	0
31	1	6	Pete Hamilton	American Brakeblok (Cotton Owens)	'71 Plymouth	87	785	engine	6
32	36	84	Dick May	Aircraft Metals (Ralph Davis)	'69 Dodge	84	655	overheating	0
33	32	07	Coo Coo Marlin	Cunningham-Kelley (H.B. Cunningham)	'69 Chevrolet	76	675	engine	0
34	15	4	John Sears	J. Marvin Mills Heating & Cooling (John Sears)	'69 Dodge	49	645	clutch	0
35	19	5	Dave Marcis	Doc Faustina	'70 Plymouth	45	640	overheating	0
36	24	8	Ed Negre	Ed Negre	'69 Ford	40	635	fuel pump	0
37	23	19	Henley Gray	Fairway Motors (Henley Gray)	'69 Ford	38	630	suspension	0
38	8	72	Benny Parsons	American Jetway (L.G. DeWitt)	'69 Mercury	29	625	engine	0
39	3	71	Bobby Isaac	K & K Insurance (Nord Krauskopf)	'71 Dodge	11	1070	water pump	1
40	13	39	Friday Hassler	Rock City (Friday Hassler)	'70 Chevrolet	7	615	engine	0

Preceded by 1971 West Virginia 500	NASCAR Winston Cup Season; 1971	Succeeded by 1971 Talladega 500
