= 1971 Delaware 500 =

Auto race run in Delaware in 1971

Race details
- Race 43 of 48 in the 1971 NASCAR Winston Cup Series season
- Layout of Dover International Speedway
- Date: October 17, 1971
- Official name: Delaware 500
- Location: Dover Downs International Speedway, Dover, Delaware
- Course: Permanent racing facility
- Course length: 1.609 km (1.000 miles)
- Distance: 500 laps, 500.0 mi (804.6 km)
- Weather: Chilly with temperatures approaching 67.3 °F (19.6 °C); wind speeds reaching a maximum of 15 miles per hour (24 km/h)
- Average speed: 123.254 miles per hour (198.358 km/h)

Pole position
Driver	Bobby Allison	Holman-Moody

Most laps led
Driver	Bobby Allison	Holman-Moody
- Laps: 394

Winner
No. 43	Richard Petty	Petty Enterprises

Television in the United States
- Network: untelevised
- Announcers: none

The 1971 Delaware 500 was a NASCAR Winston Cup Series race that took place on October 17, 1971, at Dover Downs International Speedway.

== Background ==
Dover International Speedway is one of five short tracks to hold NASCAR races; the others are Bristol Motor Speedway, Richmond International Raceway, Martinsville Speedway, and Phoenix International Raceway. The NASCAR race makes use of the track's standard configuration, a four-turn short track oval that is 1 mile (1.6 km) long. The track's turns are banked at twenty-four degrees, and both the front stretch (the location of the finish line) and the backstretch are banked at nine degrees.

== Race report ==
All the racing action took place in the American community of Dover, Delaware with five hundred laps completed on a paved oval track spanning 1.000 mile or 1.609 kilometres. It took four hours and three minutes (243 minutes) for the race to reach its full conclusion. Richard Petty defeated Charlie Glotzbach by more than one lap in front of eighteen thousand people. Richard Petty capitalizes for career win #137 as Bobby Allison's wheel troubles in the closing laps doom the dominant Holman-Moody entry. Petty pulled a "spin and win" as he looped the famous Petty Blue #43 Plymouth with 25 laps to go but didn't hit anything and got going again without losing the lead.

This race marked Fred Lorenzen's return to Ray Nichels' team and the driver's seat of the #99 STP Plymouth, having previously left the team after Talladega saying it wasn't competitive. After a one-off with the Wood Brothers at Darlington that ended in a bad crash Lorenzen came back with his stint with Nichels here wasn't the best of times. He qualified the bright #99 mid-pack and then fell out early with a blown engine. The comeback deal was supposed to be for the rest of the season but it fell apart and he left again, this time for good, with David Pearson brought in to run Rockingham instead.

Notable speeds for the race were: 123.254 miles per hour or 198.358 kilometres per hour for the average speed (which was a record during that era) and 132.811 miles per hour or 213.739 kilometres per hour for the pole position speed.

Total winnings for this race were $59,965 ($465,579 when adjusted for inflation). David Ray Boggs had his best career NASCAR Cup Series finish at this race. Richard Childress would make his only start in a vehicle other than General Motors.

Bobby Allison dominated the early portion of the race; temporarily losing the lead to Charlie Glotzbach on lap 143 and getting it back on lap 148. However, they found faulty lug nuts after pitting with two laps in the lead (which cost him an almost-guaranteed victory in that race).

=== Qualifying ===
Grid	No.	Driver	Manufacturer
1	12	Bobby Allison	'69 Mercury
2	71	Bobby Allison	'71 Dodge
3	98	Charlie Glotzbach	'71 Chevrolet
4	43	Richard Petty	'71 Plymouth
5	60	Maynard Troyer	'69 Mercury
6	91	Richard D. Brown	'71 Chevrolet
7	48	James Hylton	'69 Mercury
8	39	Friday Hassler	'70 Chevrolet
9	24	Cecil Gordon	'69 Mercury
10	57	David Ray Boggs	'69 Dodge
11	95	Paul Tyler	'69 Ford
12	90	Bill Dennis	'69 Mercury
13	1	Charlie Roberts	'69 Ford
14	79	Frank Warren	'69 Dodge
15	10	Bill Champion	'69 Ford
16	25	Jabe Thomas	'70 Plymouth
17	64	Elmo Langley	'69 Mercury
18	30	Walter Ballard	'71 Ford
19	8	Ed Negre	'69 Ford
20	06	Neil Castles	'69 Dodge
21	99	Fred Lorenzen	'71 Plymouth
22	72	Benny Parsons	'69 Mercury
23	49	G.C. Spencer	'69 Plymouth
24	51	Dub Simpson	'69 Chevrolet
25	5	Richard Childress	'70 Plymouth
26	47	Raymond Williams	'71 Ford
27	26	Earl Brooks	'69 Ford
28	34	Wendell Scott	'69 Ford
29	19	Henley Gray	'69 Ford
30	68	Larry Baumel	'69 Ford

== Finishing order ==
Section reference:

1. Richard Petty
2. Charlie Glotzbach
3. Bobby Isaac†
4. Bobby Allison
5. Bill Dennis
6. David Ray Boggs
7. Richard D. Brown
8. Elmo Langley†
9. Walter Ballard
10. James Hylton†
11. Cecil Gordon†
12. Paul Tyler
13. Frank Warren
14. Raymond Williams
15. Ed Negre†
16. Henley Gray
17. John Soares, Jr.
18. Jabe Thomas*†
19. Dick May†
20. Wendell Scott*†
21. John Sears†
22. Neil Castles*
23. Tommy Gale*†
24. Ken Meisenhelder*
25. Bill Shirey*
26. J.D. McDuffie*†
27. Bill Champion*†
28. Maynard Troyer*
29. Benny Parsons*†
30. Richard Childress*
31. Fred Lorenzen*
32. Earl Brooks*†
33. Friday Hassler*†
34. G.C. Spencer*†
35. Larry Baumel*
36. James Cox*
37. Charlie Roberts*
38. Bill Seifert*
39. Dub Simpson*
40. Dean Dalton*

* Driver failed to finish race
† signifies that the driver is known to be deceased

== Timeline ==
Section reference:

- Start of race: Bobby Allison starts the race on the pole position.
- Lap 10: Dean Dalton had an oil leak in his vehicle that would make him the last-place finisher.
- Lap 26: Dub Simpson had problems with his oil pan that would sideline for the day.
- Lap 62: The frame of Bill Seifert's vehicle came off, forcing his early exit from the race.
- Lap 68: Charlie Roberts had a terminal crash.
- Lap 87: James Cox fell out with engine failure.
- Lap 91: Larry Baumel overheated his vehicle, securing an early exit for him.
- Lap 114: Friday Hassler noticed that his engine no longer worked properly.
- Lap 115: Earl Brooks's oil pan acted up, Fred Lorenzen's vehicle had some engine issues.
- Lap 143: Charlie Glotzbach takes over the lead from Bobby Allison.
- Lap 148: Bobby Allison takes over the lead from Charlie Glotzbach.
- Lap 180: Richard Childress had problems steering his vehicle, ending his race weekend.
- Lap 229: Benny Parsons' engine blew up, making him not able to finish the race.
- Lap 266: J.D. McDuffie managed to overheat his vehicle, Bill Champion had some problems with his car's steering and the wheel bearing came off of Maynard Troyer's vehicle.
- Lap 280: Bill Shirey's engine gave out while he was on the track.
- Lap 297: The rear end of Ken Meisenhelder's vehicle fell out from under him.
- Lap 319: Tommy Gale's engine gave out, forcing him to leave the race.
- Lap 369: Neil Castles' alternator would give out while he was racing.
- Lap 392: Wendell Scott had problems with his vehicle's clutch that forced him off the track.
- Lap 400: Richard Petty takes over the lead from Bobby Allison.
- Lap 436: Jabe Thomas developed fuel pump problems.
- Finish: Richard Petty was officially declared the winner of the event.

Preceded by 1971 National 500	NASCAR Winston Cup Series Races; 1971	Succeeded by 1971 American 500

Preceded by 1971 Sandlapper 200	Richard Petty's Career Wins; 1960-1984	Succeeded by 1971 American 500
