= 1971 Maryville 200 =

Auto race held at Smoky Mountain Raceway in 1971

Race details
- Race 13 of 48 in the 1971 NASCAR Winston Cup Series season
- Date: April 15, 1971; 53 years ago
- Official name: Maryville 200
- Location: Smoky Mountain Raceway, Maryville, Tennessee
- Course: Permanent racing facility
- Course length: 0.836 km (0.520 miles)
- Distance: 200 laps, 104 mi (167.3 km)
- Weather: Mild with temperatures of 70 °F (21 °C); wind speeds of 13 miles per hour (21 km/h)
- Average speed: 88.697 miles per hour (142.744 km/h)

Pole position
Driver	Friday Hassler	Friday Hassler

Most laps led
Driver	Richard Petty	Petty Enterprises
- Laps: 134

Winner
No. 43	Richard Petty	Petty Enterprises

Television in the United States
- Network: untelevised
- Announcers: none

The 1971 Maryville 200 was a NASCAR Winston Cup Series event that took place on April 15, 1971, at Smoky Mountain Raceway in Maryville, Tennessee.

== Race report ==
Four thousand and two hundred fans came out to see vehicles average a speed of 88.697 miles per hour (142.744 km/h) on a paved oval track. Richard Petty defeated Benny Parsons by a time of eight seconds; Parsons' second-place finish came a week after coming up short at Columbia. These were his second and third runner-up finishes in NASCAR, but he'd finally break through with his first career win a month later in South Boston. Friday Hassler received the pole position with a speed of 91.464 miles per hour (147.197 km/h) while qualifying on the 0.520 miles (0.837 km) speedway. There was only one caution, which lasted for three laps. D. K. Ulrich ran his first Cup Series race here while E.J. Trivette retired from NASCAR after this race.

Smoky Mountain Raceway closed forever after this race due to the changes in the sport during the Winston Cup era that aimed to modernize it. Abbreviation of the Cup Series schedule was the order of the day in the 1970s as the new sponsors wanted NASCAR to have a schedule that was structured closer to that of the National Football League.

Richard Petty won $1,000 for winning the race, the 125th win in his NASCAR Cup Series career. Notable crew chiefs for this race included Dale Inman, Vic Ballard, Lee Gordon and Mario Rossi.

The race car drivers still had to commute to the races using the same stock cars that competed in a typical weekend's race through a policy of homologation (and under their own power). This policy was in effect until roughly 1975. By 1980, NASCAR had completely stopped tracking the year model of all the vehicles and most teams did not take stock cars to the track under their own power anymore.

=== Qualifying ===
Grid	No.	Driver	Manufacturer
1	39	Friday Hassler	'69 Chevrolet
2	43	Richard Petty	'71 Plymouth
3	06	Neil Castles	'70 Dodge
4	22	Dick Brooks	'70 Dodge
5	72	Benny Parsons	'70 Ford
6	48	James Hylton	'70 Ford
7	64	Elmo Langley	'70 Ford
8	49	G.C. Spencer	'69 Plymouth
9	2	Dave Marcis	'69 Dodge
10	38	Charlie Glotzbach	'70 Dodge
11	10	Bill Champion	'69 Ford
12	24	Cecil Gordon	'69 Mercury
13	19	Henley Gray	'69 Ford
14	30	Walter Ballard	'71 Ford
15	8	Ed Negre	'69 Ford
16	4	John Sears	'69 Dodge
17	7	Dean Dalton	'69 Ford
18	45	Bill Seifert	'69 Ford
19	56	E.J. Trivette	'71 Chevrolet
20	79	Frank Warren	'69 Dodge
21	70	J.D. McDuffie	'71 Chevrolet
22	26	Earl Brooks	'69 Ford
23	58	Robert Brown	'71 Chevrolet
24	34	Wendell Scott	'69 Ford
25	67	Dick May	'69 Ford
26	25	Jabe Thomas	'70 Plymouth
27	28	Bill Hollar	'69 Ford
28	74	Bill Shirey	'69 Plymouth
29	41	D.K. Ulrich	'70 Ford
30	02	Jimmy Crawford	'69 Plymouth

== Finishing order ==
Section reference:

1. 43-Richard Petty
2. 72-Benny Parsons†
3. 39-Friday Hassler†
4. 64-Elmo Langley†
5. 22-Dick Brooks†
6. 48-James Hylton†
7. 38-Charlie Glotzbach
8. 49-G.C. Spencer†
9. 24-Cecil Gordon†
10. 10-Bill Champion†
11. 19-Henley Gray
12. 30-Walter Ballard
13. 25-Jabe Thomas
14. 79-Frank Warren
15. 7-Dean Dalton
16. 28-Bill Hollar*†
17. 70-Bill Seifert*
18. 26-J.D. McDuffie*†
19. 26-Earl Brooks*
20. 67-Dick May*
21. 2-Dave Marcis*
22. 58-Robert Brown*
23. 4-John Sears*†
24. 34-Wendell Scott*†
25. 56-E.J. Trivette*
26. 06-Neil Castles*
27. 8-Ed Negre*
28. 74-Bill Shirey*
29. 41-D. K. Ulrich*
30. 02-Jimmy Crawford*†

* Driver failed to finish race
† signifies that the driver is known to be deceased

Preceded by 1971 Greenville 200	NASCAR Winston Cup Series Season; 1971	Succeeded by 1971 Gwyn Staley 400

Preceded by 1971 Columbia 200	Richard Petty's Career Wins; 1960-1984	Succeeded by 1971 Gwyn Staley 400
