= Kearney Bowl =

Defunct Fresno racetrack

- Location: Fresno, California
- Coordinates: 36°43′43″N 119°49′52″W
- Closed: September 18, 1970
- Former names: Italian Amusement Park Speedway, Airport Speedway

Oval
- Surface: Dirt (1936-1959); Asphalt (1959-1970)
- Length: 1/5 miles

The Kearney Bowl was a dirt oval racing track located in southwest Fresno, California. The track was paved for its final ten years of operation. It was known for midget racing and hosted United States Auto Club National Midget Championship series races as well as NASCAR supermodified hardtop races. In 1970, the entire facility was demolished and a housing complex and a school was built on the site.

== History ==
Auto racing in Fresno had occurred at a wooden racetrack built at the fairgrounds from 1920 to 1927. That track hosted races as part of the AAA circuit but sustained fire damage and was torn down. Local interest in auto and motorcycle racing remained.

=== Midget racing ===
Starting in 1933, a few welders and mechanics in the Fresno area began to construct and test cars suited for midget car racing. The sport of midget car racing was in its infancy but it was beginning to hold official races, such as one in August 1933 at the Loyola High School Stadium in Los Angeles under the control of a governing body, the Midget Auto Racing Association.

Sensing an opportunity to promote midget races in Fresno, local resident and track star Charley Kaster built a track at the Italian Amusement Park, a place for children's rides and other events, such as boxing. The amusement park and track were located a few miles west of downtown Fresno and on the north side of Kearney Boulevard.

The races at the Italian Amusement Park Speedway did not attract many viewers. It was described as "a dust bowl" and that "one could hardly see the cars." However, during this time the interest in midget car racing in California and nationwide continued to grow.

Fresno's Chandler Airport abutted the Italian Amusement Park and in 1936, the airport needed to expand. To make room for the expansion, a new race track was constructed on the south side of Kearney Boulevard which ended up being the site of racing for the next twenty-five years.

Starting in 1936, Bill Vukovich raced there and forged his career behind the wheel of a red car nicknamed "Old Ironsides." Crowds for Sunday night midgets racing at the new track began to approach 20,000. Racing was halted during the war years of 1942-1946 but resumed and the track was renamed Airport Speedway. Vukovich went on to win the 1953 and 1954 Indianapolis 500 as well as other championship races before dying while leading the 1955 Indianapolis 500.

=== Hardtop racing ===
Interest in midget car racing declined in the 1950s and supermodified hardtop racing moved into prominence at the Fresno track. A racer named Clyde Prickett won the feature hardtop race in 1955.

Blackie Gejeian, winner of the feature race in 1956, remembered Kearney Bowl and the transition from midgets to hardtop racing in a Fresno Bee article, saying: "that was one of the finest tracks in the entire state. The place just had history. It was in the early 50s and the midgets had kind of drifted away and the hardtops came in and absolutely took over everything. It was racing, it was destruction derby, it was everything put together."

In 1959, the track was renamed to Kearney Bowl and paved, setting up ten years of hosting popular and competitive hardtop races for the NASCAR circuit. The 1960s circuit consisted of racers competing at Kearney Bowl on Friday night, San Jose on Saturday, and the Clovis Speedway at the rodeo grounds on Sunday.

In May 1968, Kearney Bowl hosted a stock car race as part of the Pacific Coast Late Model circuit.

A racer named Al Pombo dueled with fellow racer Marshall Sargent and riveted the Fresno racing audience as part of this hardtop racing circuit. Pombo won seven NASCAR hardtop titles and numerous championships before retiring in 1971. Pombo and Sargent also competed against Everett Edlund, nicknamed the "Caruthers Comet" and well as Bob Cetti, who won the feature race in 1965 and Jerry Thompson, who won in 1966. Other notable racers include Bob Shermer, who was a longtime car owner and driver at Kearney Bowl early in his career.

The city of Fresno's redevelopment agency purchased the property in 1970 looking to satisfy some residents of the area who were complaining about the track. The last race at Kearney Bowl was held on September 18, 1970, and after that the racetrack and the rest of the facility was demolished. A housing complex and a school were built on the site.

Some of those who remember or participated in the hardtop circuit in the 1960s organized an annual memorial race called "Legends of the Kearney Bowl" which has taken place at Madera Speedway and Hanford's Kings Speedway. Kenny Takeuchi, who was NASCAR's traveling hardtop announcer in the 60s, was one of the organizers. The Legends of the Kearney Bowl event maintains a Wall of Fame.

=== Special events ===
Evel Knievel performed at the Kearney Bowl on August 1, 1969.

== See also ==
- Bill Vukovich
- West Coast Stock Car Hall of Fame
