= 1971 Sandlapper 200 =

Auto race held at Columbia Speedway in 1971

Race details
- Race 38 of 48 in the 1971 NASCAR Winston Cup Series season
- Date: August 27, 1971; 53 years ago
- Official name: Sandlapper 200
- Location: Columbia Speedway, Columbia, South Carolina
- Course: Permanent racing facility
- Course length: 0.500 miles (0.804 km)
- Distance: 200 laps, 100 mi (160 km)
- Weather: Hot with temperatures of 89.1 °F (31.7 °C); wind speeds of 12 miles per hour (19 km/h)
- Average speed: 64.831 miles per hour (104.335 km/h)

Pole position
Driver	Richard Petty	Petty Enterprises

Most laps led
Driver	Richard Petty	Petty Enterprises
- Laps: 110

Winner
No. 43	Richard Petty	Petty Enterprises

Television in the United States
- Network: untelevised
- Announcers: none

The 1971 Sandlapper 200 was a NASCAR Winston Cup Series racing event that took place on August 27, 1971, at Columbia Speedway in Columbia, South Carolina.

The race car drivers still had to commute to the races using the same stock cars that competed in a typical weekend's race through a policy of homologation (and under their own power). This policy was in effect until roughly 1975. By 1980, NASCAR had completely stopped tracking the year model of all the vehicles and most teams did not take stock cars to the track under their own power anymore.

== Background ==
Columbia Speedway was an oval racetrack located in Cayce, a suburb of Columbia, South Carolina. It was the site of auto races for NASCAR's top series from 1951 through 1971. For most of its history, the racing surface was dirt. The races in April and August 1970 were two of the final three Grand National races ever held on a dirt track.

The track was paved before hosting its last two Grand National races in 1971.

While Columbia Speedway was shut down to cars in 1979, noise complaints, it reopened as a velodrome in 2001.

== Race report ==
Two hundred laps were completed on a paved oval track spanning 0.500 miles (0.805 km) in only one hour and thirty-four minutes. Six cautions were given for forty-one laps; Richard Petty managed to defeat Tiny Lund by ten car lengths. Local track announcer Jim Seay would realize the charismatic potential of Petty and interviewed him right after the race in front of a regional crowd. Eight thousand people showed up in person to see cars achieve speeds of up to 64.831 miles per hour (104.335 km/h). Richard Petty, however, would achieve the pole position speed of 85.137 miles per hour (137.015 km/h). Ron Keselowski would crash prior to the first lap of the race.

The combined winnings purse for this race would be $9,275 ($72,013 when adjusted for inflation); the winner would receive $1,500 of it ($11,646 when adjusted for inflation) while the last-place finisher took home a meager $200 ($1,553 when adjusted for inflation).

H. B. Bailey was running in second place until a freak crash on 55 made him finish in 24th place (a loss of 22 positions).

Last top-10 finish for Ken Meisenhelder. The Massachusetts driver had three top-10 finishes in his career, all of them finishing 10th.

Lee Gordon, Vic Ballard and Dale Inman were among the three most notable crew chiefs to participate in this event. Inman was in charge of keeping Richard Petty's car in good order while Vic Ballard looked after Walter Ballard. Lee Gordon's primary responsibility was keeping Cecil Gordon's vehicle in decent working order.

=== Qualifying ===
Grid	No.	Driver	Manufacturer
1	43	Richard Petty	'70 Plymouth
2	36	H.B. Bailey	'71 Firebird
3	55	Tiny Lund	'69 Camaro
4	14	Jim Paschal	'70 Javelin
5	15	Wayne Andrews	'71 Mustang
6	48	James Hylton	'70 Ford
7	74	Bill Shirey	'69 Plymouth
8	87	Buck Baker	'71 Firebird
9	24	Cecil Gordon	'69 Mercury
10	64	Elmo Langley	'71 Ford
11	2	Randy Hutchinson	'69 Camaro
12	34	Wendell Scott	'69 Ford
13	4	John Sears	'69 Dodge
14	30	Walter Ballard	'71 Ford
15	7	Jimmy Vaughn	'69 Camaro
16	19	Henley Gray	'69 Ford
17	26	Earl Brooks	'69 Ford
18	10	Bill Champion	'70 Ford
19	17	Ernie Shaw	'68 Mustang
20	79	Frank Warren	'69 Plymouth
21	25	Jabe Thomas	'70 Plymouth
22	62	Ron Keselowski	'71 Dodge
23	41	Ken Meisenhelder	'69 Chevrolet
24	70	J.D. McDuffie	'69 Mercury
25	8	Ed Negre	'69 Ford
26	40	D.K. Ulrich	'70 Ford
27	32	Marv Acton	'70 Plymouth
28	96	Richard Childress	'70 Chevrolet
29	86	Bobby Mausgrover	'69 Dodge
30	73	Bill Seifert	'69 Ford

== Top 10 finishers ==
Section reference:

1. Richard Petty (No. 43), official time 1:34:24
2. Tiny Lund (No. 55), 10 car lengths down
3. Jim Paschal (No. 14), finished lead lap under green flag
4. James Hylton (No. 48), 3 laps down
5. Jabe Thomas (No. 25), 4 laps down
6. Wayne Andrews (No. 15), 4 laps down
7. Elmo Langley (No. 64), 6 laps down
8. Walter Ballard (No. 30), 7 laps down
9. Randy Hutchison (No. 2), 7 laps down
10. Ken Meisenhelder (No. 41), 10 laps down

== Timeline ==
Section reference:

- Start of race: Richard Petty had the pole position to start out the event; Ron Keselowski would fail to start the race due to a terminal crash.
- Lap 2: H.B. Bailey took over the lead from Richard Petty.
- Lap 11: The ignition on Marv Acton's vehicle stopped working properly.
- Lap 13: Richard Petty took over the lead from H.B. Bailey.
- Lap 17: Richard Childress' vehicle managed to overheat itself.
- Lap 21: Earl Brooks' vehicle managed to overheat itself.
- Lap 52: Jim Paschal took over the lead from Richard Petty.
- Lap 55: H.B. Bailey had a terminal crash, causing him not to finish the race.
- Lap 67: Richard Petty took over the lead from Jim Paschal.
- Lap 68: The brakes on D.K. Ulrich's vehicle stopped working properly.
- Lap 109: Issues with the vehicle's clutch took Ernie Shaw out of the race.
- Lap 124: Tiny Lund took over the lead from Richard Petty.
- Lap 143: Ed Negre had ignition problems that forced him out of the event.
- Lap 152: Frank Warren could not steer his vehicle properly, forcing him to leave for safety reasons.
- Lap 159: J.D. McDuffie had a terminal crash; bringing his race to an end.
- Lap 162: Jimmy Vaughn had a terminal crash; ending his race early.
- Lap 188: Richard Petty took over the lead from Tiny Lund.
- Finish: Richard Petty was officially declared the winner of the event.

Preceded by 1971 West Virginia 500	Richard Petty's Career Wins; 1960-1984	Succeeded by 1971 Delaware 500

Preceded by 1971 Talladega 500	NASCAR Winston Cup Series Season; 1971	Succeeded by 1971 Buddy Shuman 276
