= 1969 Richmond 500 =

Auto race held at Richmond Fairgrounds Raceway in 1969

Race details
- Race 14 of 54 in the 1969 NASCAR Grand National Series season
- Layout of Richmond Raceway
- Date: April 13, 1969
- Official name: Richmond 500
- Location: Richmond Fairgrounds Raceway, Richmond, Virginia
- Course: Permanent racing facility
- Course length: 0.872 km (0.542 miles)
- Distance: 500 laps, 271 mi (436 km)
- Weather: Chilly with temperatures of 64 °F (18 °C); wind speeds of 12 miles per hour (19 km/h)
- Average speed: 73.752 miles per hour (118.692 km/h)

Pole position
Driver	David Pearson	Holman Moody

Most laps led
Driver	David Pearson	Holman Moody
- Laps: 416

Winner
No. 17	David Pearson	Holman Moody

Television in the United States
- Network: untelevised
- Announcers: none

The 1969 Richmond 500 was a NASCAR Grand National Series event that was held on April 13, 1969, at Richmond Fairgrounds (now Richmond Raceway) in Richmond, Virginia.

The transition to purpose-built racecars began in the early 1960s and occurred gradually over that decade. Changes made to the sport by the late 1960s brought an end to the "strictly stock" vehicles of the 1950s.

== Background ==
In 1953, Richmond International Raceway began hosting the Grand National Series with Lee Petty winning that first race in Richmond. The original track was paved in 1968. In 1988, the track was re-designed into its present D-shaped configuration

The name for the raceway complex was "Strawberry Hill" until the Virginia State Fairgrounds site was bought out in 1999 and renamed the "Richmond International Raceway".

== Race report ==
It took three hours, twenty-three minutes, and twenty-three seconds to finish. David Pearson defeated Richard Petty by one full lap. The average speed of the race was 73.752 miles per hour (118.692 km/h). Starting at 1:00 PM, the race concluded at 4:23 PM. The cost of attending this event was $8 ($68.6 when adjusted for inflation).

There were six cautions for forty laps and there were six lead changes among four leaders. This race would be Worth McMillion's final race and serve as a debut race for Ed Hessert and John Kenney. Kenney would be black flagged in the race and became the last-place finisher due to a disqualification. Other notable racers included J.D. McDuffie, Elmo Langley, Wendell Scott, and Neil Castles.

Bobby Isaac was a pre-race favorite as he came into this race riding a three-race winning streak in the #71 K&K Insurance Dodge Charger. Isaac put his red car on the front row in qualifying but a blown motor in the opening laps ended his bid for a fourth win in a row. Pearson was vocally disappointed at that turn of events in victory lane, he thought he had a car that could beat Isaac straight up and had been hoping to beat him in a direct fight.

Richmond's hometown hero Sonny Hutchins qualified Junie Donlavey's famous #90 Ford 4th but a failed rear end get took him out early on. He'd get a much better result when the series returned to Richmond in the fall. Modified ace Ray Hendrick was the other hometown entry and he too when out with mechanical failure.

The winner of the race walked away with $3,650 ($31,297 when adjusted for inflation) out of the total prize purse of $18,900 ($162,056 when adjusted for inflation). While there were several cautions the only notable wreck was Cecil Gordon and Dr. Ed Hessert's early incident in Turn 4 that put both their cars out. Gordon's car owner Bill Seifert hit the inside wall on the frontstretch but still finished in the top-5.

Notable crew chiefs at this event were John Hill, Dick Hutcherson, Dale Inman, and Harry Hyde.

=== Qualifying ===
Grid	No.	Driver	Manufacturer	Owner
1	17	David Pearson	'69 Ford	Holman-Moody
2	71	Bobby Isaac	'69 Dodge	Nord Krauskopf
3	43	Richard Petty	'69 Ford	Petty Enterprises
4	90	Sonny Hutchins	'67 Ford	Junie Donlavey
5	48	James Hylton	'69 Dodge	James Hylton
6	25	Jabe Thomas	'68 Plymouth	Don Robertson
7	10	Bill Champion	'68 Ford	Bill Champion
8	4	John Sears	'67 Ford	L.G. DeWitt
9	18	Dick Johnson	'68 Ford	Dick Johnson
10	67	Buddy Arrington	'69 Dodge	Buddy Arrington

=== Finishing order ===
Section reference:

1. David Pearson† (No. 17)
2. Richard Petty (No. 43)
3. Elmo Langley† (No. 64)
4. Neil Castles (No. 06)
5. Bill Seifert (No. 45)
6. J.D. McDuffie† (No. 70)
7. Bill Champion*† (No. 10)
8. E.J. Trivette (No. 80)
9. Henley Gray (No. 19)
10. Pete Hazelwood* (No. 12)
11. Dick Johnson* (No. 18)
12. Jabe Thomas† (No. 25)
13. Ray Hendrick*† (No. 20)
14. Worth McMillion*† (No. 9)
15. James Hylton*† (No. 48)
16. Paul Dean Holt* (No. 23)
17. Earl Brooks*† (No. 26)
18. John Sears*† (No. 4)
19. Ed Negre*† (No. 8)
20. Sonny Hutchins*† (No. 90)
21. Cecil Gordon*† (No. 47)
22. Ed Hessert* (No. 56)
23. Buddy Arrington* (No. 67)
24. Wendell Scott† (No. 34)
25. Ben Arnold* (No. 76)
26. Dick Poling* (No. 82)
27. Bobby Isaac*† (No. 71)
28. John Kenney* (No. 1)

† signifies that the driver is known to be deceased
* Driver failed to finish race

== Timeline ==
Section reference:

- Start of race: David Pearson had the pole position to officially begin the event.
- Lap 56: John Sears took over the lead from David Pearson.
- Lap 59: David Pearson took over the lead from John Sears.
- Lap 74: James Hylton took over the lead from David Pearson.
- Lap 134: David Pearson took over the lead from James Hylton.
- Lap 188: Richard Petty took over the lead from David Pearson.
- Lap 209: David Pearson took over the lead from Richard Petty.
- Lap 362: Dick Johnson managed to blow his engine from the excess speeds of stock car racing.
- Lap 365: Pete Hazelwood's engine stopped working properly.
- Lap 450: Bill Champion had issues with his vehicle's clutch, causing him to exit the race prematurely.
- Finish: David Pearson was officially declared the winner of the event.

Preceded by 1969 Greenville 200	Grand National Series races 1969	Succeeded by 1969 Gwyn Staley 400
