= 1971 West Virginia 500 =

Auto race

Race details
- Race 35 of 48 in the 1971 NASCAR Winston Cup Series season
- Date: August 8, 1971; 53 years ago
- Official name: West Virginia 500
- Location: International Raceway Park, Ona, West Virginia
- Course: Permanent racing facility
- Course length: 0.732 km (0.455 miles)
- Distance: 500 laps, 227.5 mi (366.1 km)
- Weather: Temperatures of 80.1 °F (26.7 °C); wind speeds of 4.1 miles per hour (6.6 km/h)
- Average speed: 83.805 miles per hour (134.871 km/h)
- Attendance: 10,000

Pole position
Driver	Bobby Allison	Melvin Joseph

Most laps led
Driver	Richard Petty	Petty Enterprises
- Laps: 279

Winner
No. 43	Richard Petty	Petty Enterprises

Television in the United States
- Network: untelevised
- Announcers: none

The 1971 West Virginia 500 was a NASCAR Winston Cup Series racing event that took place on August 8, 1971, at International Raceway Park in Ona, West Virginia.

The race car drivers still had to commute to the races using the same stock cars that competed in a typical weekend's race through a policy of homologation (and under their own power). This policy was in effect until roughly 1975. By 1980, NASCAR had completely stopped tracking the year model of all the vehicles and most teams did not take stock cars to the track under their own power any more.

== Race report ==
Five hundred laps took place on a paved oval track spanning 0.455 miles (0.732 km). The total time of the race was two hours and fifty-seven minutes. The average speed of the race was 83.805 miles per hour (134.871 km/h) while the qualifying speed for the pole position was 84.053 miles per hour (135.270 km/h). Ten thousand people would attend the live race to see Richard Petty defeat Bobby Allison by more than two laps. It was quite the battle between Petty and Allison during the course of the race. Petty beat on Allison all night and at one point pinned Allison against the wall so hard that both cars came to a stop. There was a grid of 32 competitors; only 14 of them were counted as finishing the race.

Notable crew chiefs to participate in this race were Dale Inman, Vic Ballard, and Lee Gordon.

Jerry Churchill decided to quit the race after the first lap; giving him a meager $300 paycheck ($2,329 in current US dollars). Bill Shirey would also quit on lap 31; earning the same amount that Churchill did. Bill Seifert would leave the race on lap 187 due to a legitimate illness brought on by dehydration in the West Virginia summertime heat.

No replacement was found and he brought home $330 from his hard day of racing ($2,562 in today's American dollars).

=== Qualifying ===
Grid	No.	Driver	Manufacturer
1	49	Bobby Allison	'70 Mustang
2	43	Richard Petty	'71 Plymouth
3	64	Elmo Langley	'71 Ford
4	14	Jim Paschal	'70 Javelin
5	48	James Hylton	'71 Ford
6	55	Tiny Lund	'70 Camaro
7	33	Joe Dean Huss	'69 Camaro
8	11	Junior Spencer	'69 Camaro
9	87	Buck Baker	'71 Firebird
10	06	Neil Castles	'70 Dodge
11	10	Bill Champion	'70 Ford
12	86	David Ray Boggs	'71 Firebird
13	45	Bill Seifert	'69 Ford
14	24	Cecil Gordon	'69 Mercury
15	15	Wayne Andrews	'71 Mustang
16	26	Earl Brooks	'69 Ford
17	41	Gary Myers	'70 Mustang
18	19	Henley Gray	'69 Ford
19	94	Al Straub	'71 Mustang
20	5	Pee Wee Wentz	'69 Camaro
21	78	Paul Tyler	'69 Camaro
22	7	Jimmy Vaughn	'69 Camaro
23	3	Charlie Glotzbach	'71 Chevrolet
24	74	Bill Shirey	'69 Plymouth
25	30	Walter Ballard	'71 Ford
26	25	Jabe Thomas	'70 Plymouth
27	34	Wendell Scott	'69 Ford
28	70	Wendell Scott	'69 Mercury
29	47	Raymond Williams	'71 Ford
30	2	Randy Hutchinson	'71 Camaro

== Finishing order ==
1. Richard Petty (No. 43)
2. Bobby Allison (No. 49)
3. James Hylton† (No. 48)
4. Tiny Lund† (No. 55)
5. Cecil Gordon† (No. 24)
6. Jim Paschal*† (No. 14)
7. Gary Myers (No. 41)
8. Walter Ballard (No. 30)
9. Bill Champion† (No. 10)
10. Jabe Thomas† (No. 25)
11. Earl Brooks† (No. 26)
12. J.D. McDuffie† (No. 70)
13. Wendell Scott† (No. 34)
14. David Ray Boggs (No. 86)
15. Joe Dean Huss (No. 33)
16. Buck Baker*† (No. 87)
17. Randy Hutchinson* (No. 2)
18. Neil Castles* (No. 06)
19. Jimmy Vaughn* (No. 7)
20. John Sears*† (No. 4)
21. Gordon Birkett* (No. 50)
22. Ed Negre*† (No. 8)
23. Wayne Andrews* (No. 15)
24. Bill Seifert* (No. 45)
25. Elmo Langley*† (No. 64)
26. Junior Spencer* (No. 11)
27. Charlie Glotzbach* (No. 3)
28. Pee Wee Wentz* (No. 5)
29. Raymond Williams* (No. 47)
30. Al Straub* (No. 94)
31. Frank Warren* (No. 79)
32. Bill Shirey* (No. 74)
33. Henley Gray* (No. 19)
34. Paul Tyler* (No. 78)
35. Jerry Churchill*† (No. 73)

* Driver failed to finish race
† signifies that the driver is known to be deceased

== Timeline ==
Section reference:

- Start of race: Bobby Allison lead the starting grid as the green flag was waved.
- Lap 1: Jerry Churchill chose to quit the race.
- Lap 11: Paul Tyler's engine stopped working properly.
- Lap 30: Richard Petty took over the lead from Bobby Allison.
- Lap 31: Bill Shirey chose to quit the race.
- Lap 53: Bobby Allison took over the lead from Richard Petty.
- Lap 55: Tiny Lund took over the lead from Bobby Allison.
- Lap 75: Bobby Allison took over the lead from Tiny Lund.
- Lap 100: Pee Wee Wentz' engine stopped working properly.
- Lap 112: Ignition problems took Junior Spencer out of the race.
- Lap 141: Ignition problems took Elmo Langley out of the race.
- Lap 148: Richard Petty took over the lead from Bobby Allison.
- Lap 187: A sudden medical issue forced Bill Seifert out of the event prematurely.
- Lap 206: Wayne Andrews managed to overheat his vehicle.
- Lap 214: Carburetor problems forced Ed Negre into a 22nd-place finish.
- Lap 224: Ignition problems took John Sears out of the race.
- Lap 234: Bobby Allison took over the lead from Richard Petty.
- Lap 298: Richard Petty took over the lead from Bobby Allison.
- Lap 300: Bobby Allison took over the lead from Richard Petty.
- Lap 312: Neil Castles' engine stopped working properly.
- Lap 316: Richard Petty took over the lead from Bobby Allison.
- Lap 349: Bobby Allison took over the lead from Richard Petty.
- Lap 362: Richard Petty took over the lead from Bobby Allison.
- Lap 413: Buck Baker's engine stopped working properly.
- Lap 420: Bobby Allison took over the lead from Richard Petty.
- Lap 424: Richard Petty took over the lead from Bobby Allison.
- Lap 477: Jim Paschal's engine stopped working properly.
- Finish: Richard Petty was officially declared the winner of the event.

Preceded by 1971 Myers Brothers 250	NASCAR Winston Cup Season; 1971	Succeeded by 1971 Yankee 400

Preceded by 1971 Dixie 500	Richard Petty's Career Wins; 1960-1984	Succeeded by 1971 Sandlapper 200
