= 1971 National 500 =

Auto race held at Charlotte Motor Speedway in 1971

Race details
- Race 42 of 48 in the 1971 NASCAR Winston Cup Series season
- Layout of Charlotte Motor Speedway
- Date: October 10, 1971
- Official name: National 500
- Location: Charlotte Motor Speedway, Concord, North Carolina
- Course: Permanent racing facility
- Course length: 1.500 miles (2.414 km)
- Distance: 238 laps, 357.000 mi (574.536 km)
- Scheduled distance: 334 laps, 501.000 mi (806.281 km)
- Weather: Chilly with temperatures of 63 °F (17 °C); wind speeds of 10.1 miles per hour (16.3 km/h)
- Average speed: 126.14 miles per hour (203.00 km/h)
- Attendance: 52,000

Pole position
Driver	Charlie Glotzbach	Howard & Egerton Racing

Most laps led
Driver	Charlie Glotzbach	Howard & Egerton Racing
- Laps: 119

Winner
No. 12	Bobby Allison	Holman Moody

Television in the United States
- Network: ABC
- Announcers: Keith Jackson; Chris Economaki

The 1971 National 500 was a NASCAR Winston Cup Series racing event that took place on October 10, 1971, at Charlotte Motor Speedway in Concord, North Carolina. Most of the vehicles used in the race had a rating of 427 cubic inches.

The race car drivers still had to commute to the races using the same stock cars that competed in a typical weekend's race through a policy of homologation (and under their own power). This policy was in effect until roughly 1975. By 1980, NASCAR had completely stopped tracking the year model of all the vehicles and most teams did not take stock cars to the track under their own power anymore.

== Race report ==
There were 42 American-born drivers on this 238-lap race. It was supposed to last for 334 laps but the race had to end early due to rain and darkness. On the day of the race, 0.22 inches of precipitation were recorded around the speedway.

Bobby Allison managed to defeat Bobby Isaac by five seconds in front of 52000 people. The race lasted more than two and a half hours with six caution periods lasting for 37 laps. Charlie Glotzbach rightfully earned the pole position with a qualifying speed of 157.085 miles per hour (252.804 km/h) while the winner of the race would have an average speed of 126.14 miles per hour (203.00 km/h).

Jim Vandiver would end up getting the last-place finish on lap 10 due to a single-car collision into the wall. Wendell Scott had to leave the race because his vehicle developed faulty wheel bearings on lap 63 while Dick Brooks' vehicle broke down early and finished poorly on lap 73. A faulty lug bolt took Neil Castles of the race on lap 114 while an engine problem took Maynard Troyer out of the race on lap 115. A couple of crashes on lap 120 took LeeRoy Yarbrough and Earle Canavan out of the race while steering problems took Dave Marcis out of the race on lap 152. Stick Elliot's vehicle developed a faulty driveshaft on lap 163 while lap 184 would see A.J. Foyt retiring from the race due to steering problems. Cale Yarborough would overheat his car on lap 209, ending his hopes of acquiring a top-ten finish.

Bobby Allison and Richard Petty were duking it out up front at speeds up to 160 miles per hour (260 km/h), highlighting that Allison drove the Coke car during the race while Petty drove for Pepsi. Tiny Lund also had a Pepsi car in this one but dropped out early on.

Country music singing sensation and part-time NASCAR driver Marty Robbins would finish in 37th place in his 1969 Dodge Charger machine after starting in 15th. LeeRoy Yarbrough ran a limited schedule during the 1971 season as Ford's factories were pulling out of NASCAR production at that time. This would force NASCAR teams using the Ford manufacturer to create vehicles by themselves with their in-house staff. Injuries sustained while practicing for that year's Indianapolis 500 contributed to the limited NASCAR schedule. He managed to shake off those injuries long enough to qualify in seventh place and finish in a lowly 34th place.

The total purse of the race was $83,259 ($661,899 when adjusted for inflation); Allison would earn $18,450 of the total prize winnings that were offered in the race ($29,466 when adjusted for inflation).

=== Qualifying ===
Grid	No.	Driver	Manufacturer
1	3	Charlie Glotzbach	'71 Chevrolet
2	11	Buddy Baker	'71 Dodge
3	12	Bobby Allison	'69 Mercury
4	21	Donnie Allison	'69 Mercury
5	43	Richard Petty	'71 Plymouth
6	6	Pete Hamilton	'71 Plymouth
7	98	LeeRoy Yarbrough	'71 Chevrolet
8	71	Bobby Isaac	'71 Dodge
9	48	James Hylton	'69 Mercury
10	99	Dave Marcis	'71 Plymouth
11	72	Benny Parsons	'69 Mercury
12	24	Cecil Gordon	'69 Mercury
13	90	Bill Dennis	'69 Mercury
14	39	Friday Hassler	'70 Chevrolet
15	42	Marty Robbins	'69 Dodge
16	91	Ed Negre	'71 Chevrolet
17	49	Neil Castles	'69 Plymouth
18	60	Maynard Troyer	'69 Mercury
19	92	Larry Smith	'69 Ford
20	45	Bill Seifert	'71 Mercury
21	18	Joe Frasson	'70 Dodge
22	19	Henley Gray	'70 Ford
23	27	A.J. Foyt	'71 Chevrolet
24	79	Frank Warren	'69 Dodge
25	07	Wendell Scott	'69 Chevrolet
26	31	Stick Elliott	'69 Dodge
27	47	J.D. McDuffie	'71 Ford
28	25	Jabe Thomas	'70 Plymouth
29	76	Ben Arnold	'69 Ford
30	30	Walter Ballard	'71 Ford

== Finishing order ==
1. Bobby Allison
2. Bobby Isaac
3. Donnie Allison
4. Richard Petty
5. Charlie Glotzbach
6. Buddy Baker
7. Pete Hamilton
8. Friday Hassler
9. James Hylton
10. Benny Parsons
11. Joe Frasson
12. Jabe Thomas
13. Frank Warren
14. Elmo Langley
15. Cecil Gordon
16. Bill Champion
17. Bill Seifert
18. David Ray Boggs
19. Ed Negre
20. Walter Ballard
21. Earl Brooks
22. J.D. McDuffie
23. Ben Arnold
24. Bobby Brack
25. Larry Smith
26. Johnny Halford
27. Henley Gray
28. Cale Yarborough
29. John Sears
30. A. J. Foyt
31. Stick Elliott
32. Dave Marcis
33. Earle Canavan
34. LeeRoy Yarbrough
35. Maynard Troyner
36. Neil Castles
37. Marty Robbins
38. Tiny Lund
39. Dick Brooks
40. Bill Dennis
41. Wendell Scott
42. Jim Vandiver

Preceded by 1971 Old Dominion 500	NASCAR Winston Cup Series Races; 1971	Succeeded by 1971 Delaware 500

Preceded by 1970	National 500 races 1971	Succeeded by 1972
