= 1970 National 500 =

Auto race held at Charlotte Motor Speedway in 1970

Race details
- Race 44 of 48 in the 1970 NASCAR Grand National Series season
- Layout of Charlotte Motor Speedway
- Date: October 11, 1970
- Official name: National 500
- Location: Charlotte Motor Speedway, Concord, North Carolina
- Course: Permanent racing facility
- Course length: 1.500 miles (2.414 km)
- Distance: 334 laps, 500 mi (804 km)
- Weather: Warm with temperatures of 82.9 °F (28.3 °C); wind speeds of 6 miles per hour (9.7 km/h)
- Average speed: 123.246 mph (198.345 km/h)
- Attendance: 50,000

Pole position
Driver	Charlie Glotzbach	Nichels Engineering
- Time: 34.335 seconds

Most laps led
Driver	LeeRoy Yarbrough	Junior Johnson & Associates
- Laps: 112

Winner
No. 12	LeeRoy Yarbrough	Junior Johnson & Associates

Television in the United States
- Network: ABC
- Announcers: Jim McKay; Chris Economaki

The 1970 National 500 was a NASCAR Grand National Series stock car race that was held on October 11, 1970, at Charlotte Motor Speedway in Concord, North Carolina.

There were 14 winged cars involved in the race; including Lorenzen, Baker, Vandiver, Richard Petty, and Glotzbach.

== Race report ==
Out of the 62 cars that were reported as having been entered on October 9, 1970, only 43 of them were properly recorded by NASCAR officials. Former NASCAR star Curtis Turner had formed an agreement with track president Richard Howard to run the race in a one-off, but he was killed in a plane crash days before the event.

Only 40 of 43 officially registered drivers qualified for the starting grid. George Eaton and Buck Baker were recorded as sharing the No. 58 vehicle. Drivers that did not qualify were Buck Baker, George Eaton, Raymond Williams and Dick Polling. Cale Yarborough was credited with the last-place finish on lap 10 due to a crash with the wall. Fifty thousand racing fans would see 23 different lead changes and eight cautions for a period of 63 laps. An unusually lengthy race for the early 1970s, the 1970 National 500 lasted a grueling four hours and three minutes.

This race marked Kmart's debut as a NASCAR sponsor as they backed Fred Lorenzen's white #3 Dodge Daytona. The winged Charger would fly high today as Fast Freddie brought it home with a podium finish and led a few laps en route.

The race was held on a dry circuit; with no precipitation recorded around the speedway.

LeeRoy Yarbrough would defeat Bobby Allison under the yellow flag. This would become Yarbrough's final win in the NASCAR Cup Series. Charlie Glotzbach would qualify for the pole position in this race by driving speeds up to 157.273 miles per hour (253.106 km/h) during the solo sessions. Other notable drivers at this race were David Pearson, Coo Coo Marlin, Frank Warren, Richard Petty and J.D. McDuffie.

A lot of the drivers did not finish the race because of crashes on the track. Eleven notable crew chiefs participated in the race; including Herb Nab, Junie Donlavey, Harry Hyde, Dale Inman, Tom Vandiver and Banjo Matthews. The race car drivers still had to commute to the races using the same stock cars that competed in a typical weekend's race through a policy of homologation (and under their own power). This policy was in effect until roughly 1975. By 1980, NASCAR had completely stopped tracking the year model of all the vehicles and most teams did not take stock cars to the track under their own power anymore.

=== Qualifying ===
Grid	No.	Driver	Manufacturer	Speed	Qualifying time	Owner
1	99	Charlie Glotzbach	'69 Dodge	157.273	34.335	Ray Nichels
2	43	Richard Petty	'70 Plymouth	156.521	34.500	Petty Enterprises
3	6	Buddy Baker	'69 Dodge	156.499	34.505	Cotton Owens
4	3	Fred Lorenzen	'69 Dodge	154.883	34.865	Ray Fox
5	98	LeeRoy Yarbrough	'69 Mercury	154.789	34.886	Junior Johnson
6	40	Pete Hamilton	'70 Plymouth	154.714	34.903	Petty Enterprises
7	17	David Pearson	'69 Ford	154.523	34.944	Holman-Moody
8	21	Cale Yarborough	'69 Mercury	153.876	35.093	Wood Brothers
9	71	Bobby Isaac	'69 Dodge	152.797	35.341	Nord Krauskopf
10	22	Bobby Allison	'69 Dodge	152.771	35.347	Mario Rossi

== Top 10 finishers ==
Pos	Grid	No.	Driver	Manufacturer	Laps	Winnings	Laps led	Time/Status
1	5	98	LeeRoy Yarbrough	Mercury	334	$23,700	112	4:03:28
2	10	22	Bobby Allison	Dodge	334	$10,950	22	Lead lap under caution
3	4	3	Fred Lorenzen	Dodge	333	$6,400	3	+4 laps
4	15	72	Benny Parsons	Ford	329	$3,955	0	+8 laps
5	9	71	Bobby Isaac	Dodge	323	$3,330	2	Engine failure
6	18	64	Elmo Langley	Mercury	321	$2,265	0	+16 laps
7	19	10	Bill Champion	Ford	320	$2,065	0	+17 laps
8	20	5	Buddy Arrington	Dodge	319	$1,965	0	+19 laps
9	36	46	Roy Mayne	Chevrolet	317	$1,955	0	+21 laps
10	22	39	Friday Hassler	Chevrolet	315	$1,765	0	Engine failure

Preceded by 1970 Wilkes 400	NASCAR Grand National Series season 1969	Succeeded by 1970 Old Dominion 500

Preceded by 1969	National 500 races 1970	Succeeded by 1971
