= 1971 Dixie 500 =

Auto race held at Atlanta International Raceway in 1971

Race details
- Race 33 of 48 in the 1971 NASCAR Winston Cup Series season
- Outline of Atlanta International Raceway
- Date: August 1, 1971
- Official name: Dixie 500
- Location: Atlanta International Raceway, Hampton, Georgia
- Course: Permanent racing facility
- Course length: 1.522 miles (2.449 km)
- Distance: 328 laps, 499.2 mi (803.3 km)
- Weather: Temperatures of 80.1 °F (26.7 °C); wind speeds of 10.1 miles per hour (16.3 km/h)
- Average speed: 129.061 miles per hour (207.704 km/h)
- Attendance: 22,500

Pole position
Driver	Buddy Baker	Petty Enterprises

Most laps led
Driver	Richard Petty	Petty Enterprises
- Laps: 181

Winner
No. 43	Richard Petty	Petty Enterprises

Television in the United States
- Network: untelevised
- Announcers: none

The 1971 Dixie 500 was a NASCAR Winston Cup Series racing event that took place on August 1, 1971, at Atlanta International Raceway in Hampton, Georgia.

== Background ==
Atlanta International Raceway (now Atlanta Motor Speedway) is one of ten current intermediate tracks to hold NASCAR races. The layout at Atlanta International Speedway at the time was a four-turn traditional oval track that is 1.54 miles (2.48 km) long. The track's turns are banked at twenty-four degrees, while the front stretch, the location of the finish line, and the back stretch are banked at five.

== Race report ==
Richard Petty defeated Bobby Allison by 2 car lengths in front of 22500 spectators. Five cautions slowed the race for 48 laps; making the race last three hours and fifty-two minutes in length. Buddy Baker qualified for the pole position with a speed of 155.796 miles per hour (250.729 km/h), while the average speed was 129.061 miles per hour (207.704 km/h).

Dave Marcis had problems with his vehicle's suspension on lap 38 while Raymond Williams' vehicle had a faulty transmission on lap 40. Dub Simpson blew his engine on lap 60. Ed Negre wrecked his vehicle's transmission on lap 62. Coo Coo Marlin would over-exhaust his engine on lap 82 while Charlie Roberts did the same thing on lap 90. The suspension on Neil Castles' vehicle stopped working on lap 92. Bill Dennis' vehicle had some serious vibration issues on lap 131 while Paul Tyler's engine blew on lap 149. Further engine problems occurred on lap 231 with Buddy Baker, lap 249 with Pete Hamilton, lap 264 with Earl Brooks, and lap 302 with Bobby Brack.

Friday Hassler got his third top six finish in a row less than a month after driving the Junior Johnson Chevy to victory at Bristol in relief of Charlie Glotzbach.

Richard Petty officially became a millionaire after this race; bringing his career earnings to over $1,000,000 ($7,949,877 when adjusted for inflation). This would be the last time a driver won 5 races in a row, in any series, until 2009 when Ron Hornaday won five in a row in the 2009 NASCAR Camping World Truck Series season. Dick Poling would retire from the NASCAR Cup Series after finishing in 26th place during this race.

Notable crew chiefs who in the race were Junie Donlavey, Harry Hyde, Dale Inman, Vic Ballard, Lee Gordon, and John Green.

=== Qualifying ===
Grid	No.	Driver	Manufacturer	Owner
1	11	Buddy Baker	'71 Dodge	Petty Enterprises
2	3	Charlie Glotzbach	'71 Chevrolet	Richard Howard
3	43	Richard Petty	'71 Plymouth	Petty Enterprises
4	6	Pete Hamilton	'71 Plymouth	Cotton Owens
5	12	Bobby Allison	'69 Mercury	Holman-Moody Racing
6	21	Donnie Allison	'69 Mercury	Wood Brothers
7	71	Bobby Isaac	'71 Dodge	Nord Krauskopf
8	2	Dave Marcis	'69 Dodge	Dave Marcis
9	64	Elmo Langley	'69 Mercury	Elmo Langley
10	45	Bill Seifert	'71 Ford	Bill Seifert
11	18	Joe Frasson	'70 Dodge	Joe Frasson
12	79	Frank Warren	'69 Dodge	Frank Warren
13	76	Ben Arnold	'69 Ford	Ben Arnold
14	06	Neil Castles	'70 Dodge	Neil Castles
15	48	James Hylton	'70 Ford	James Hylton
16	49	G.C. Spencer	'69 Plymouth	G.C. Spencer
17	42	Marty Robbins	'69 Dodge	Marty Robbins
18	72	Benny Parsons	'69 Mercury	L.G. DeWitt
19	24	Cecil Gordon	'69 Mercury	Cecil Gordon
20	39	Friday Hassler	'70 Chevrolet	Friday Hassler

== Finishing order ==
Section reference:

1. Richard Petty (#43)
2. Bobby Allison (#12)
3. Benny Parsons (#72)
4. Charlie Glotzbach (#3)
5. Friday Hassler (#39)
6. Donnie Allison (#21)
7. Ron Keselowski (#88)
8. Frank Warren (#79)
9. James Hylton (#48)
10. Bill Champion (#10)
11. Richard D. Brown (#91)
12. Cecil Gordon (#24)
13. Marty Robbins (#42)
14. Jabe Thomas (#25)
15. Bill Seifert (#25)
16. Bobby Brack* (#53)
17. J. D. McDuffie (#70)
18. Walter Ballard (#30)
19. Ben Arnold (#76)
20. Henley Gray (#19)
21. Wendell Scott (#34)
22. Dick May (#5)
23. Earl Brooks* (#36)
24. Pete Hamilton* (#6)
25. Buddy Baker* (#11)
26. Dick Poling (#62)
27. G.C. Spencer* (#49)
28. Paul Tyler* (#95)
29. John Sears* (#4)
30. Bill Dennis* (#96)
31. Neil Castles* (#06)
32. Charlie Roberts* (#77)
33. Bobby Isaac* (#71)
34. Coo Coo Marlin* (#07)
35. Joe Frasson* (#18)
36. Ed Negre* (#8)
37. Dub Simpson* (#93)
38. Raymond Williams* (#47)
39. Dave Marcis* (#2)
40. Elmo Langley* (#64)

* Driver failed to finish race

Preceded by 1971 Nashville 420	NASCAR Winston Cup Season; 1971	Succeeded by 1971 Myers Brothers 250

Preceded by 1971 Nashville 420	Richard Petty's Career Wins; 1960-1984	Succeeded by 1971 West Virginia 500
