= Spencer Clark (racing driver) =

American racing driver (1987–2006)

- Born: January 29, 1987; Las Vegas, Nevada, U.S.
- Died: May 21, 2006 (aged 19); Bernalillo County, New Mexico, U.S.
- Cause of death: Road accident
- Achievements: 2001 Champion Semi Pro Legends Cars (National and at Las Vegas Speedway); 2001 Winner INEX Race of Champions
- Awards: 2003 Rookie of the Year NASCAR Super Late Models at Las Vegas Motor Speedway

NASCAR O'Reilly Auto Parts Series career
- 1 race run over 1 year
- 2006 position: 132nd
- Best finish: 132nd (2006)
- First race: 2006 Sam's Town 300 (Las Vegas)
Wins	Top tens	Poles
0	0	0

Spencer Clark (January 29, 1987 – May 21, 2006) was an American stock car racing driver.

Clark raced in short tracks in his home state of Nevada and was named a Young Lions National in 2001. In 2003, he competed in four races in the Mechanix Wear SpeedTruck Series, grabbing three pole positions. He was also named Rookie of the Year in the late model series at Las Vegas Motor Speedway. The next season, he finished fifth in points, posting two wins.

In 2005, Clark made his debut in the NASCAR West Series, running five races. He would run three more the next season, where he also made his Busch Series debut at Las Vegas, where he finished 35th in the 2006 Sam's Town 300.

On May 21, 2006, Clark was on his way back from picking up a car in Charlotte, North Carolina, when the trailer hauling the car fishtailed from a sidewind and caused the driver to lose control and flip the truck outside of Albuquerque, New Mexico. He was pronounced dead at the scene.

Clark was the son of T. J. Clark who competed in the inaugural 1995 NASCAR SuperTruck Series tour in the No. 23 truck. GMS Racing, whose owner Maurice Gallagher Jr. and son Spencer Gallagher come from Las Vegas, fielded the No. 23 in NASCAR and the ARCA Menards Series in Clark's honor.

== Motorsports career results ==
=== NASCAR ===
(key) (Bold – Pole position awarded by qualifying time. Italics – Pole position earned by points standings or practice time. * – Most laps led.)

==== Busch Series ====
NASCAR Busch Series results
Year	Team	No.	Make	1	2	3	4	5	6	7	8	9	10	11	12	13	14	15	16	17	18	19	20	21	22	23	24	25	26	27	28	29	30	31	32	33	34	35	NBSC	Pts	Ref
2006	Chris Diederich Racing	65	Ford	DAY	CAL	MXC	LVS; 35	ATL	BRI	TEX	NSH	PHO	TAL	RCH	DAR	CLT	DOV	NSH	KEN	MLW	DAY	CHI	NHA	MAR	GTY	IRP	GLN	MCH	BRI	CAL	RCH	DOV	KAN	CLT	MEM	TEX	PHO	HOM	132nd	58	

==== Autozone West Series ====
NASCAR Autozone West Series results
Year	Team	No.	Make	1	2	3	4	5	6	7	8	9	10	11	12	NWSC	Pts	Ref
2005	Chris Diederich Racing	26	Ford	PHO; 14	MMR	PHO; 5	S99									20th	621	
2005	Chris Diederich Racing	26	Pontiac					IRW; 28	EVG	S99						20th	621	
2005	Rich's Motorsports	23	Chevy								PPR; 19*	CAL; 5	DCS	CTS	MMR	20th	621	
2006	Chris Diederich Racing	26	Ford	**PHO**; 4*	PHO; 9											25th	423	
2006	Clark Racing	23	Ford			S99; 16	IRW	SON	DCS	IRW	EVG	S99	CAL	CTS	AMP	25th	423	
