= Eric Hardin =

American racing driver (born 1982)

- Born: June 22, 1982 (age 44); Anaheim, California, U.S.

ARCA Menards Series West career
- 34 races run over 4 years
- Best finish: 7th (2007)
- First race: 2005 King Taco 150 (Irwindale)
- Last race: 2008 California Highway Patrol 200 (Irwindale)
Wins	Top tens	Poles
0	10	0
- Statistics up to date as of November 13, 2024.

Eric Hardin (born June 22, 1982) is an American former professional stock car racing driver who competed in the NASCAR Camping World West Series from 2005 to 2008.

Hardin is an amputee, having had cancer at the age of thirteen that required surgery to remove his over right leg.

Hardin has previously competed in the Copper World Classic.

== Motorsports results ==
=== NASCAR ===
(key) (Bold - Pole position awarded by qualifying time. Italics - Pole position earned by points standings or practice time. * – Most laps led.)

==== Camping World West Series ====
NASCAR Camping World West Series results
Year	Team	No.	Make	1	2	3	4	5	6	7	8	9	10	11	12	13	NCWWSC	Pts	Ref
2005	Eric Hardin	01	Chevy	PHO	MMR	PHO	S99	IRW; 19	EVG	S99	PPR	CAL	DCS	CTS	MMR; 18		35th	215	
2006	Bill McAnally Racing	18	Chevy	PHO; 24	PHO; 27	S99; 9	IRW; 20	SON; 20	DCS; 11	IRW; 22	EVG; 14	S99; 10	CAL; 13	CTS; 10	AMP; 19		13th	1363	
2007	Dennis Hardin	5	Chevy	CTS; 20	PHO; 16	AMP; 4	ELK; 3	IOW; 10	CNS; 11	SON; 12	DCS; 6	IRW; 14	MMP; 8	EVG; 13	CSR; 22	AMP; 10	7th	1712	
2008	Dennis Hardin	5	Chevy	AAS; 7	PHO; 26	CTS; 4	IOW; 18	CNS; 12	SON; 25	IRW; 13	DCS	EVG	MMP	IRW	AMP	AAS	20th	839	
