= Jim Inglebright =

American racing driver (born 1961)

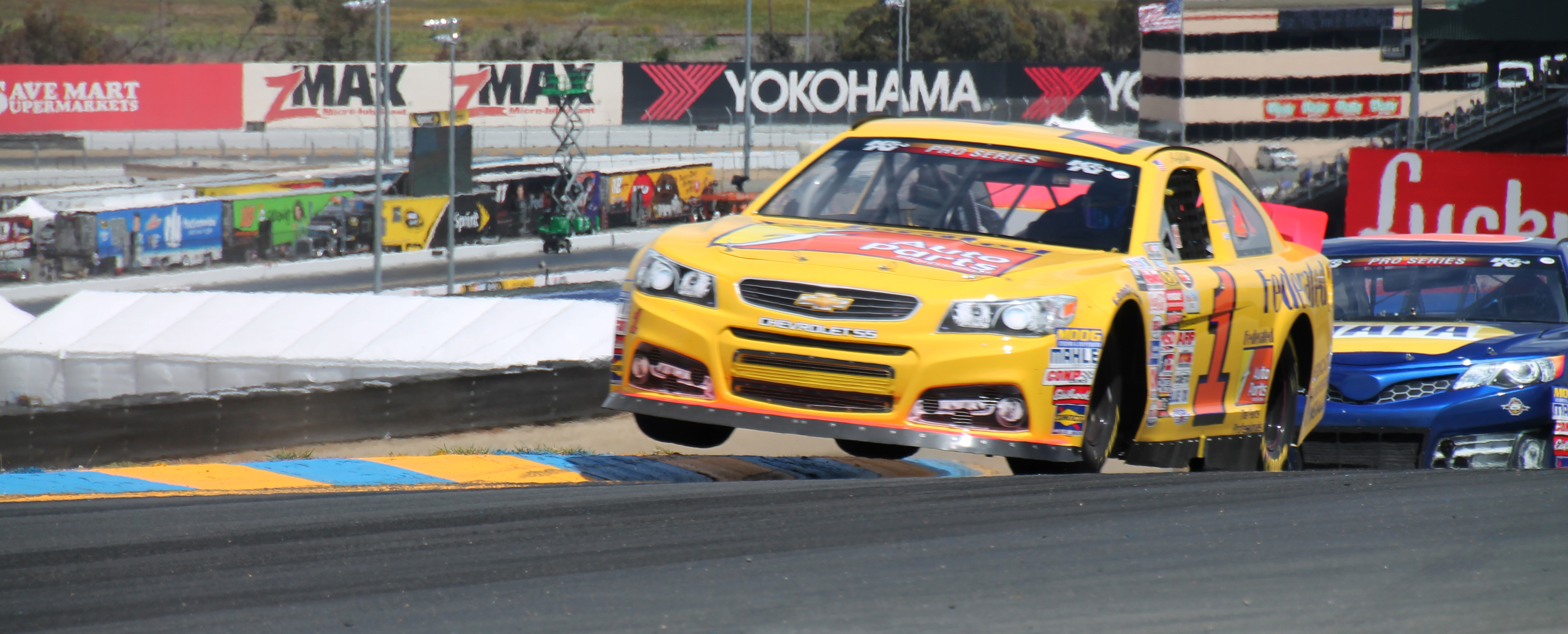
- Inglebright racing in the 2015 Carneros 200 at Sonoma Raceway
- Born: James Inglebright; November 18, 1961 (age 64); Fairfield, California, U.S.

NASCAR Cup Series career
- 2 races run over 2 years
- Best finish: 74th (2004)
- First race: 2002 Dodge/Save Mart 350 (Infineon)
- Last race: 2004 Dodge/Save Mart 350 (Infineon)
Wins	Top tens	Poles
0	0	0

NASCAR FedEx Freight Truck Series career
- 17 races run over 2 years
- Best finish: 29th (2001)
- First race: 2000 Chevy Trucks NASCAR 150 (Phoenix)
- Last race: 2001 Auto Club 200 (Gateway)
Wins	Top tens	Poles
0	1	0
- Statistics up to date as of July 25, 2022.

James Inglebright (born November 18, 1961) is an American professional stock car racing driver. He is a longtime competitor in the NASCAR West Series (now the ARCA Menards Series West).

== Racing career ==
Inglebright began his racing career driving motocross. However, after seven knee operations, he switched to stock car racing.

Inglebright ran 99 races in the NASCAR AutoZone Elite Division, Southwest Series. After much success in the series, Inglebright won eight races and amassed 62 top ten finishes. In the 1995 NASCAR Featherlite Southwest Series, Inglebright was a runner-up. He was the eleventh NFSWS driver to surpass $100,000 from his career winnings.

Inglebright then moved up to the NASCAR West Series, winning one race and finishing in the top-ten 11 times in his first full season. Although he was once a full-season competitor, he later only competed in the Sonoma race each year in his own No. 1 car.

Inglebright's run at Sonoma in 2019 came for Jefferson Pitts Racing, with him continuing to use the No. 1 from his family team, but in a Ford Fusion instead of a Chevrolet.

Inglebright also raced in the top three divisions of NASCAR, including as a road course ringer in the NASCAR Cup Series race at Sonoma Raceway for three straight years. In Cup, he has two starts in three attempts (all at Sonoma), with a 32nd place finish in 2002 in his family team's No. 0 car, and a nineteenth place finish in 2004 in the Richard Childress Racing No. 30. In the Craftsman Truck Series, Inglebright ran seventeen races from 2000 and 2001 (with one DNQ in 2002 as well) scoring a top-ten at California Speedway.

== Motorsports career results ==
=== NASCAR ===
(key) (Bold – Pole position awarded by qualifying time. Italics – Pole position earned by points standings or practice time. * – Most laps led.)

==== Nextel Cup Series ====
NASCAR Nextel Cup Series results
Year	Team	No.	Make	1	2	3	4	5	6	7	8	9	10	11	12	13	14	15	16	17	18	19	20	21	22	23	24	25	26	27	28	29	30	31	32	33	34	35	36	NNCC	Pts	Ref
2002	Roadrunner Motorsports	0	Chevy	DAY	CAR	LVS	ATL	DAR	BRI	TEX	MAR	TAL	CAL	RCH	CLT	DOV	POC	MCH	SON; 32	DAY	CHI	NHA	POC	IND	GLN	MCH	BRI	DAR	RCH	NHA	DOV	KAN	TAL	CLT	MAR	ATL	CAR	PHO	HOM	76th	67	
2003	Bill McAnally Racing	00	Chevy	DAY	CAR	LVS	ATL	DAR	BRI	TEX	TAL	MAR	CAL	RCH	CLT	DOV	POC	MCH	SON; DNQ	DAY	CHI	NHA	POC	IND	GLN	MCH	BRI	DAR	RCH	NHA	DOV	TAL	KAN	CLT	MAR	ATL	PHO	CAR	HOM	N/A	0	
2004	Richard Childress Racing	30	Chevy	DAY	CAR	LVS	ATL	DAR	BRI	TEX	MAR	TAL	CAL	RCH	CLT	DOV	POC	MCH	SON; 19	DAY	CHI	NHA	POC	IND	GLN	MCH	BRI	CAL	RCH	NHA	DOV	TAL	KAN	CLT	MAR	ATL	PHO	DAR	HOM	74th	106	

==== Craftsman Truck Series ====
NASCAR Craftsman Truck Series results
Year	Team	No.	Make	1	2	3	4	5	6	7	8	9	10	11	12	13	14	15	16	17	18	19	20	21	22	23	24	NCTC	Pts	Ref
2000	Roadrunner Motorsports	02	Chevy	DAY	HOM	PHO; 18	MMR	MAR	PIR	GTY	MEM	PPR; 18	EVG; 15	TEX	KEN	GLN	MLW	NHA; 24	NZH	MCH	IRP; 16	NSV	CIC; 27	RCH	DOV	TEX	CAL; 15	32nd	742	
2001	Roadrunner Motorsports	02	Chevy	DAY	HOM	MMR; 15	MAR	GTY; 29	DAR	PPR; 26	DOV	TEX	MEM	MLW; 14	KAN	KEN; 14	NHA	IRP; 16	NSH	CIC; 31	NZH	RCH	SBO	TEX	LVS; 30	PHO; 17	CAL; 8	29th	1033	
2002	Roadrunner Motorsports	02	Chevy	DAY; DNQ	DAR	MAR	GTY	PPR	DOV	TEX	MEM	MLW	KAN	KEN	NHA	MCH	IRP	NSH	RCH	TEX	SBO	LVS	CAL	PHO	HOM			N/A	0	

==== Busch East Series ====
NASCAR Busch East Series results
Year	Team	No.	Make	1	2	3	4	5	6	7	8	9	10	11	12	13	NBESC	Pts	Ref
2007	Roadrunner Motorsports	1	Chevy	GRE	ELK; DNQ	IOW	SBO	STA	NHA	TMP	NSH	ADI	LRP	MFD	NHA	DOV	N/A	0	

==== K&N Pro Series West ====
NASCAR K&N Pro Series West results
Year	Team	No.	Make	1	2	3	4	5	6	7	8	9	10	11	12	13	14	15	NKNPSWC	Pts	Ref
1995	Info not available	57	Olds	TUS	MMR	SON; 11	CNS	MMR	POR	SGS	TUS	AMP	MAD	POR	LVS	SON	MMR	PHO	48th	130	
2003	Bill McAnally Racing	20	Chevy	PHO; 3	**LVS**; 1*	CAL; 15	MAD; 8	TCR; 9	EVG; 11	IRW; 22	S99; 15	RMR; 10	DCS; 4	PHO; 5	MMR; 11				6th	1672	
2004	Tony Oddo	25	Ford	PHO; 5	MMR	CAL	S99	EVG	IRW	S99	RMR	DCS	PHO	CNS	MMR	IRW			48th	155	
2005	Roadrunner Motorsports	1	Chevy	PHO	MMR	PHO	S99	IRW	EVG	S99	PPR	CAL	DCS	CTS	MMR; 27				62nd	82	
2006	Roadrunner Motorsports	1	Chevy	PHO; 8	PHO; 8	S99; 5	IRW; 15	SON; 23	DCS; 5	IRW; 6	EVG; 11	S99; 13	CAL; 2	CTS; 12	AMP; 6				6th	1657	
2007	Roadrunner Motorsports	1	Chevy	CTS; 21	PHO; 27	AMP; 20	ELK; DNQ	IOW; 15	CNS; 6	SON; 21	DCS; 5	IRW; 10	MMP; 10	EVG; 8	CSR; 4	AMP; 27			11th	1487	
2008	Roadrunner Motorsports	1	Chevy	AAS; 14	PHO; 22	CTS; 5		CNS; 7	SON; 3	IRW; 5	DCS; 6	EVG; 5	MMP; 13*	IRW; 11	AMP; 15	AAS; 10			5th	1840	
2008	Roadrunner Motorsports	01	Chevy				IOW; 1												5th	1840	
2009	Roadrunner Motorsports	1	Chevy	CTS; 15	AAS; 11	PHO; 30	MAD; 16	IOW	DCS	SON; 39	IRW	PIR; 1	MMP; 14	CNS	IOW	AAS; 9			15th	926	
2010	Roadrunner Motorsports	1	Chevy	AAS	PHO	IOW	DCS	SON; 8	IRW	PIR; 24	MRP	CNS	MMP; 11	AAS	PHO				32nd	363	
2011	Roadrunner Motorsports	1	Chevy	PHO; 6	AAS	MMP; 3	IOW	LVS	SON; 6	IRW	EVG	PIR	CNS	MRP	SPO	AAS	PHO		33rd	470	
2012	Roadrunner Motorsports	1	Chevy	PHO	LHC	MMP	S99	IOW	BIR	LVS	SON; 4	EVG	CNS	IOW	PIR; 9	SMP	AAS	PHO	36th	75	
2013	Roadrunner Motorsports	1	Chevy	PHO	S99	BIR	IOW	L44	SON; 13	CNS	IOW	EVG	SPO	MMP	SMP	AAS	KCR	PHO	58th	31	
2014	Roadrunner Motorsports	1	Chevy	PHO	IRW	S99	IOW	KCR	SON; 8	SLS	CNS	IOW	EVG	KCR	MMP	AAS	PHO		57th	36	
2015	Roadrunner Motorsports	1	Chevy	KCR	IRW	TUS	IOW	SHA	SON; 32	SLS	IOW	EVG	CNS	MER	AAS	PHO			73rd	12	
2016	Roadrunner Motorsports	1	Chevy	IRW	KCR	TUS	OSS	CNS	SON; DNS	SLS	IOW	EVG	DCS	MMP	MMP	MER	AAS		59th	13	
2017	Roadrunner Motorsports	20	Chevy	TUS	KCR	IRW	IRW	SPO	OSS	CNS	SON; 30	IOW	EVG	DCS	MER	AAS	KCR		62nd	14	
2018	Roadrunner Motorsports	1	Chevy	KCR	TUS	TUS	OSS	CNS	SON; 18	DCS	IOW	EVG	GTW	LVS	MER	AAS	KCR		54th	26	
2019	Jefferson Pitts Racing	1	Ford	LVS	IRW	TUS	TUS	CNS	SON; 7	DCS	IOW	EVG	GTW	MER	AAS	KCR	PHO		43rd	37	
