= Moses Smith =

American racing driver (born 1976)

- Born: March 30, 1976 (age 50); Tempe Arizona, U.S.
- Awards: 2008–2011 NASCAR K&N Pro Series West Most Popular Driver (4 times)

ARCA Menards Series West career
- 67 races run over 6 years
- Best finish: 3rd (2011)
- First race: 2006 King Taco 200 (Irwindale)
- Last race: 2011 Casino Arizona 125 (Phoenix)
Wins	Top tens	Poles
0	38	0
- Statistics up to date as of November 13, 2024.

Moses Smith (born March 30, 1976) is an American former professional auto racing driver who competed in the NASCAR K&N Pro Series West, the Infiniti Pro Series, the Michelin Pilot Challenge, and the Trans Am Championship.

Smith has also competed in series such as the ASA Truck Series, the Indy Pro 2000 Championship, the Star Mazda Series, and the Westcar Late Model Series.

== Motorsports results ==
=== American open–wheel racing results ===
(key) (Races in bold indicate pole position)

==== Indy Pro Series ====
Year	Team	1	2	3	4	5	6	7	8	9	10	11	12	Rank	Points
2003	Kenn Hardley Racing	HMS	PHX	INDY	PPIR	KAN	NSH	MIS	STL; 13	KTY	CHI	FON	TXS	**28th**	**17**

=== NASCAR ===
(key) (Bold - Pole position awarded by qualifying time. Italics - Pole position earned by points standings or practice time. * – Most laps led.)

==== K&N Pro Series West ====
NASCAR K&N Pro Series West results
Year	Team	No.	Make	1	2	3	4	5	6	7	8	9	10	11	12	13	14	NKNPSWC	Pts	Ref
2006	Moses Smith	76	Pontiac	PHO	PHO	S99	IRW	SON	DCS	IRW; 10	EVG	S99; 14	CAL	CTS	AMP; 17			28th	367	
2007	Bill McAnally Racing	18	Chevy	CTS; 27	PHO; 28	AMP; 15	ELK; 11	IOW; DNQ	CNS; 9	SON; 28	DCS; 7	IRW; 21	MMP; 11	EVG; 6	CSR; 15	AMP; 17		12th	1418	
2008	Bill McAnally Racing	16	Toyota	AAS; 5	PHO; 7	CTS; 16	IOW; 6	CNS; 6	SON; 28	IRW; 9	DCS; 7	EVG; 7	MMP; 4	IRW; 9	AMP; 11	AAS; 3		6th	1823	
2009	Bill McAnally Racing	16	Toyota	CTS; 2	AAS; 8	PHO; 16	MAD; 8	IOW; 8	DCS; 5	SON; 29	IRW; 9	PIR; 14	MMP; 5	CNS; 3	IOW; 26	AAS; 5		7th	1766	
2010	Bill McAnally Racing	16	Toyota	AAS; 8	PHO; 16	IOW; 14	DCS; 4	SON; 9	IRW; 4	PIR; 15	MRP; 3	CNS; 15	MMP; 4	AAS; 8	PHO; 10			4th	1678	
2011	Bill McAnally Racing	16	Toyota	PHO; 8	AAS; 2	MMP; 2	IOW; 13	LVS; 20	SON; 7	IRW; 12	EVG; 3	PIR; 4	CNS; 6	MRP; 10	SPO; 5	AAS; 17	PHO; 17	3rd	1980	
