= ARCA Menards Series West =

American auto racing series

- Category: Stock cars
- Country: United States
- Inaugural season: 1954
- Manufacturers: Chevrolet · Ford · Toyota
- Engine suppliers: Ilmor (ARCA Ilmor 396); Roush-Yates (RYR Spec); Chevrolet (350 small block, SB2); Dodge (R5P6); Ford (351 Windsor)
- Tire suppliers: General Tire
- Drivers' champion: Trevor Huddleston
- Makes' champion: Ford
- Teams' champion: High Point Racing
- Official website: ARCA Racing

The ARCA Menards Series West, formerly the NASCAR K&N Pro Series West, NASCAR Camping World West Series, NASCAR West Series, NASCAR AutoZone West Series, NASCAR Winston West Series, NASCAR Winston Transcontinental Series, NASCAR Grand National West, and NASCAR Pacific Coast Late Model Division, is a regional stock car racing series owned and operated by the Automobile Racing Club of America (ARCA) and the National Association for Stock Car Auto Racing (NASCAR). The series was first formed in 1954 as a proving ground for drivers from the western United States who could not travel to race in the more traditional stock car racing regions like North Carolina and the rest of the southern United States.

Races are held at oval tracks ranging from 1/3 to 1 mile (0.54–1.61 km) in length and on two road courses, 1.53 and 2.45 miles (2.46 and 3.94 km) in length. Most races are stand-alone events (i.e. not in conjunction with other NASCAR touring series), but there are four race weekends that are in combination with the NASCAR Cup Series.

Many of the ARCA Menards Series West drivers on the series are gaining experience with the hopes of moving up to one of the major NASCAR series, however some of the drivers are right at home in the series and have no plans of moving on. Notable drivers who participated in the series include Ryan Blaney, Kevin Harvick, Brendan Gaughan, Derrike Cope, Chad Little and David Gilliland.

The other regional division at the Grand National level of ARCA is the Menards Series East.

== History ==
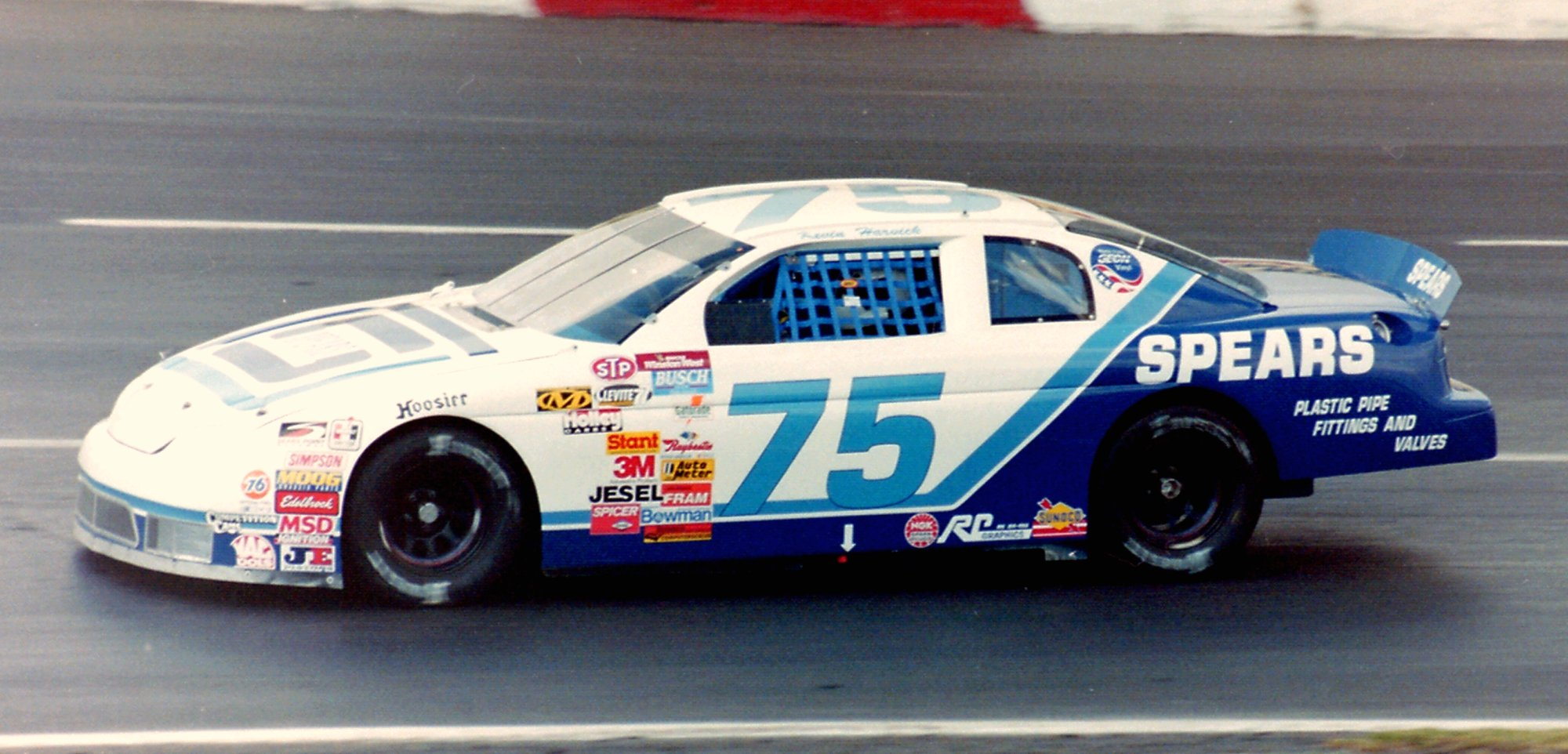
NASCAR Cup Series driver Kevin Harvick in the then-Winston West Series in 1997.

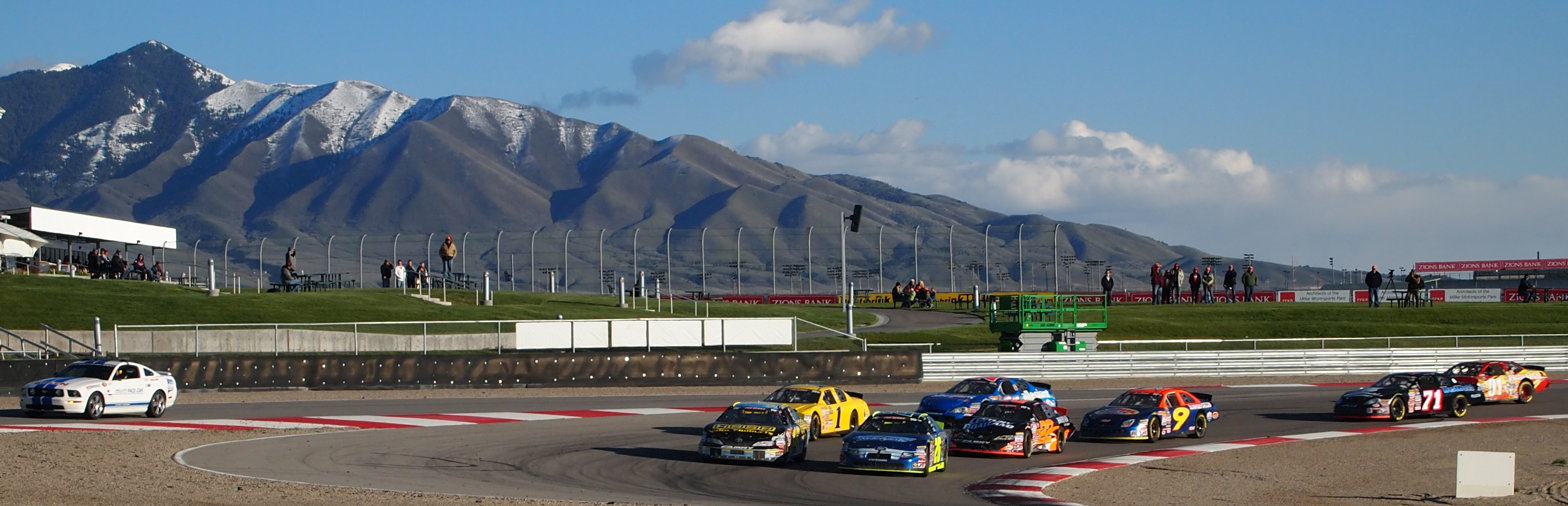
Restart from caution, 2011 Utah Grand Prix

The Menards Series West began in 1954 as the Pacific Coast Late Model Division. Nine races were in held in the first year, many of which were held in California, in cities such as Oakland, San Diego, San Mateo and Gardena. The inaugural series championship was won by Lloyd Dane driving a 1953 Hudson Hornet.

Afterward, the series became known as the Grand National West Series, then the Winston West Series. At first, the series sanctioned races on dirt tracks and paved tracks, but as the series developed, more races were held on paved tracks, with the final race on a dirt track being held in 1979 until the series returned to dirt in 2018. Though the series primarily sanctions races in the United States, the series has also traveled to Australia in 1988 and Japan from 1996 to 1998 for exhibition races. The series became the first series to sanction a championship race outside the United States in 1999, when the final race was held at Twin Ring Motegi.

In 2003, the Busch North Series was consolidated into the series forming the modern day series. For the 2008 season, Camping World bought naming rights of the series, renaming it the Camping World West Series. Two years later, K&N Engineering, Inc. replaced Camping World as the title sponsor.

In 2020, the series became part of the ARCA Menards Series banner and was renamed to the ARCA Menards Series West.

== Tracks ==
ARCA Menards Series West tracks in 2026
Points paying races

== Television broadcasting ==
Races were held on NBC Sports. Since 2024, the races have been streamed on FloRacing.

== ARCA Menards Series West cars ==
=== General ===
As part of NASCAR's unification of the two Camping World Series in 2003, the cars can be either a 105-inch (2,700 mm, which had been used in the former Busch Grand National East) or 110-inch (2,800 mm, which had been used in the former Winston West) wheelbase. Cambered/off-set rear ends are not allowed.

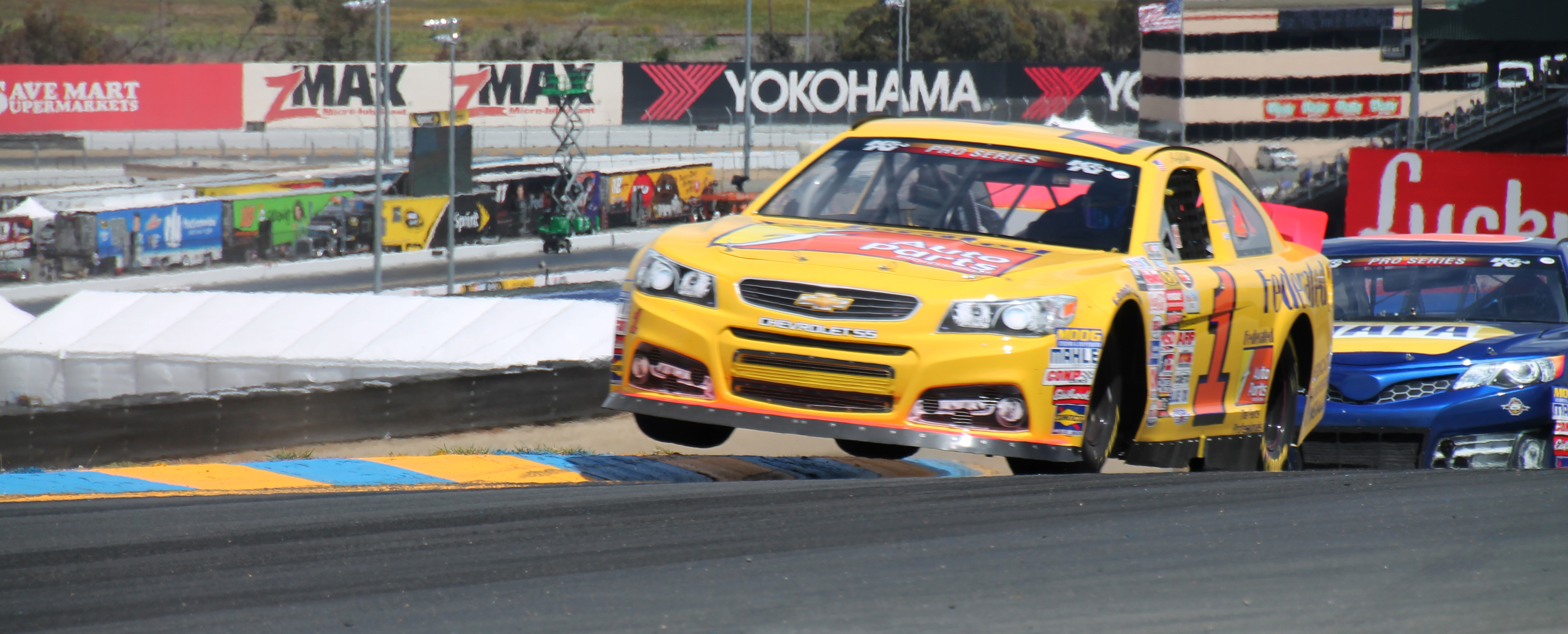
Jim Inglebright competing in the 2015 Carneros 200 in a Chevrolet SS

The car bodies are typically a hand-built steel body, however teams may also use a one-piece composite body. The composite body is a "common" item that may be run as any manufacturer branded car (i.e. only one style of composite body for all four car manufacturers [Ford, Chevy, Dodge, Toyota]). Teams then "brand" the composite body by the grill opening, quarter window openings and the vehicle decal package (head lights, tail lights, etc.). Due to the introduction of the Car of Tomorrow in the NASCAR Sprint Cup Series, many of the vehicles on the series are old Sprint Cup cars. Another popular way to get a complete body is to buy a "cut-off" body from a Nationwide series team and mount it on a chassis.

Teams have an option of building their own engines or they may run a specification engine, similar to what is used in many short tracks. Both engines are V8, pushrod, 12:1 compression motors. "Built" motors are built to team specifications using any configuration of pieces as long as it still meets NASCAR specifications. The spec engine is built using NASCAR-Approved pieces that may be purchased from an approved supplier. The engines may be purchased as a kit or pre-assembled. All of the spec pieces are individually encrypted with a barcode for verification and tracking purposes and can be checked during the inspection process with an encryption reader.

When the series first started, the cars ran a V6 engine with a maximum 274 cu in (4,490 cm^{3}) displacement and no compression limit . In the early/mid 1990s the V8 engine with a 9.5:1 compression and maximum 358 cu in (5,870 cm^{3}) displacement was introduced to the series as an alternative to the V6 engines. Due to the decrease in popularity of the V6, it was phased out for the 1999 season. When the East and West series rules were combined, the compression ratio changed to 12:1.

Cars may use leaded or unleaded fuel. However, when running in conjunction with one of the three national touring (Truck, Xfinity, Cup) series, unleaded fuel must be used.

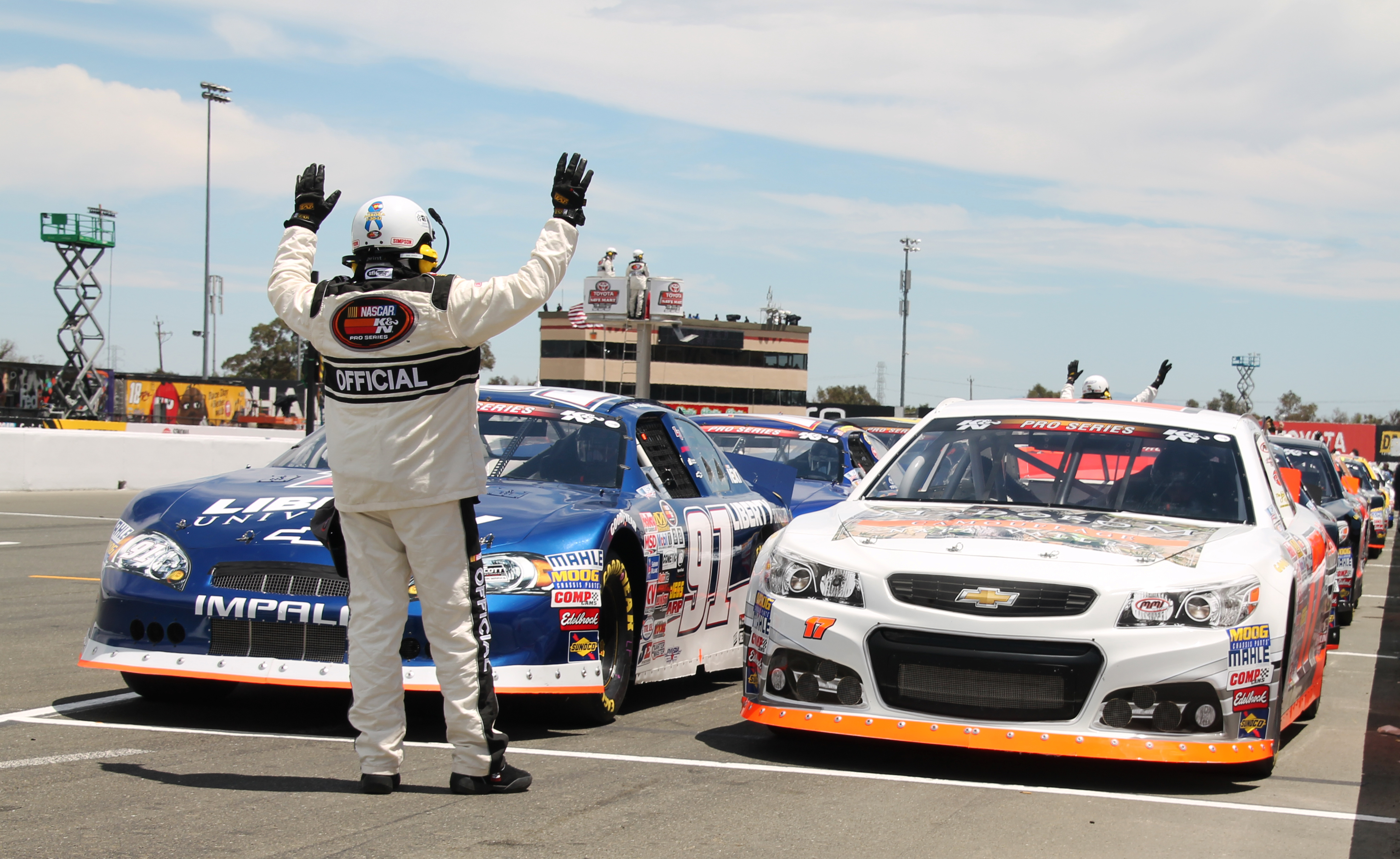
A Gen-4 Chevrolet Impala (left) and Gen-6 Chevrolet SS at Sonoma Raceway in 2015.

On November 4, 2014 at the SEMA Show in Las Vegas, NASCAR president Mike Helton unveiled a new body style for the K&N Pro Series based on the Sprint Cup Series Gen 6 models. The new body, developed with Five Star Race Car Bodies, is constructed of a composite laminate blend and designed with easily replaceable body panels, expected to shrink the costs of fabrication dramatically. The body style is eligible for use in both Menards Series competition and ARCA Racing Series competition, replacing the old Gen 4-style steel bodies after 2015, and the current one-piece composite body after 2016. The Chevrolet SS, Ford Fusion, and Toyota Camry bodies used in Sprint Cup are the basis of the new bodies. No Dodge option is available with this car.

Along with all of ARCA and NASCAR's international series, the Menards Series have General Tire as their exclusive tire supplier.

=== Specifications ===
- Engine displacement: 358 cu in (5.8 L) Pushrod V8.
- Transmission: 4 speed Manual.
- Weight: 3,300 lb (1,497 kg) Minimum (without driver).
- Power output: ~650 hp (485 kW) unrestricted.
- Fuel: Sunoco Leaded or Unleaded gasoline.
- Fuel capacity: 22 U.S. gallons (83.2 L).
- Fuel delivery: Carburetion.
- Compression ratio: 12:1.
- Aspiration: Naturally aspirated.
- Carburetor size: 390 cu ft/min (184 L/s) 4-barrel.
- Wheelbase: 105 in (2667 mm)/ 110 in (2794 mm).
- Steering: Power, recirculating ball.

== Seasons ==
Ray Elder has scored the most championships with six, while Bill Schmitt and Roy Smith each have four.

Year	Champion	Most Popular Driver	Rookie of the Year
1954	Lloyd Dane		
1955	Danny Letner		
1956	Lloyd Dane (2)		
1957	Lloyd Dane (3)		
1958	Eddie Gray		
1959	Bob Ross		
1960	Marvin Porter		
1961	Eddie Gray (2)		
1962	Eddie Gray (3)		
1963	Ron Hornaday Sr.		
1964	Ron Hornaday Sr. (2)		
1965	Bill Amick	Ray Elder	
1966	Jack McCoy	Ray Elder (2)	
1967	Scotty Cain	Marshall Sargent	
1968	Scotty Cain (2)	Ray Elder (3)	
1969	Ray Elder	Ray Elder (4)	
1970	Ray Elder (2)	Ray Elder (5)	
1971	Ray Elder (3)	Ray Elder (6)	Dick Kranzler
1972	Ray Elder (4)	Ray Elder (7)	Carl Adams
1973	Jack McCoy (2)	Ray Elder (8)	Richard White
1974	Ray Elder (5)	Ray Elder (9)	Markey James
1975	Ray Elder (6)	Ray Elder (10)	Don Puskarich
1976	Chuck Bown	Jimmy Insolo	Gary Johnson
1977	Bill Schmitt	Chuck Bown	Pat Mintey
1978	Jimmy Insolo	Jimmy Insolo (2)	Rick McCray
1979	Bill Schmitt (2)	Jimmy Insolo (3)	Tim Williamson
1980	Roy Smith	David Pearson	Don Waterman
1981	Roy Smith (2)	Hershel McGriff	Jim Bown
1982	Roy Smith (3)	Hershel McGriff (2)	Jim Reich
1983	Jim Robinson	Hershel McGriff (3)	Ron Esau
1984	Jim Robinson (2)	Hershel McGriff (4)	Derrike Cope
1985	Jim Robinson (3)	Hershel McGriff (5)	Glen Steurer
1986	Hershel McGriff	Hershel McGriff (6)	Chad Little
1987	Chad Little	Hershel McGriff (7)	Roman Calczynski
1988	Roy Smith (4)	Hershel McGriff (8)	Bob Howard
1989	Bill Schmitt (3)	Hershel McGriff (9)	Bill Sedgwick
1990	Bill Schmitt (4)	Hershel McGriff (10)	Mike Chase
1991	Bill Sedgwick	Hershel McGriff (11)	Billy Jac Shaw
1992	Bill Sedgwick (2)	Hershel McGriff (12)	Rick Carelli
1993	Rick Carelli	Rick Carelli	Dirk Stephens
1994	Mike Chase	Ron Hornaday Jr.	Doug George
1995	Doug George	Ernie Cope	Ernie Cope
1996	Lance Hooper	Larry Gunselman	Lance Hooper
1997	Butch Gilliland	Butch Gilliland	Gary Smith
1998	Kevin Harvick	Scott Gaylord	Austin Cameron
1999	Sean Woodside	Butch Gilliland (2)	Jason Small
2000	Brendan Gaughan	Bobby Dotter	Mike Duncan
2001	Brendan Gaughan (2)	Brendan Gaughan	Mark Reed
2002	Eric Norris	Scott Gaylord (2)	Mike David
2003	Scott Lynch	Austin Cameron	Scott Lynch
2004	Mike Duncan	Austin Cameron (2)	David Gilliland
2005	Mike Duncan (2)	Sarah Fisher	Andrew Lewis
2006	Eric Holmes	Austin Cameron (3)	Peyton Sellers
2007	Mike David	Mike Duncan	Jason Bowles
2008	Eric Holmes (2)	Moses Smith	Jeff Barkshire
2009	Jason Bowles	Moses Smith (2)	Paulie Harraka
2010	Eric Holmes (3)	Moses Smith (3)	Luis Martinez Jr.
2011	Greg Pursley	Moses Smith (4)	Dylan Kwasniewski
2012	Dylan Kwasniewski	Cassie Gannis	Austin Dyne
2013	Derek Thorn	Cameron Hayley	Dylan Lupton
2014	Greg Pursley (2)	Brandon McReynolds	James Bickford
2015	Chris Eggleston	Nicole Behar	Noah Gragson
2016	Todd Gilliland	Salvatore Iovino	Todd Gilliland
2017	Todd Gilliland (2)		Derek Kraus
2018	Derek Thorn (2)		Hailie Deegan
2019	Derek Kraus		Jagger Jones
2020	Jesse Love		Jesse Love
2021	Jesse Love (2)		Jake Drew
2022	Jake Drew		Tanner Reif
2023	Sean Hingorani		Sean Hingorani
2024	Sean Hingorani (2)		Eric Johnson Jr.
2025	Trevor Huddleston		Robbie Kennealy
2026	Trevor Huddleston (2)		Cole Denton

- Bold and italicized driver indicates he/she has won at least 1 of both NASCAR Cup Series and NASCAR O'Reilly Series championships.

== All-time win table ==
A total of 214 different drivers have scored wins in the series with Jack McCoy having the most with 54, followed by Ray Elder who has 47 wins.

All figures correct as of the NAPA Auto Parts 150 at Kevin Harvick's Kern Raceway (October 31, 2026).

Key
*	ARCA Menards Series West champion
#	Driver is competing full-time in the 2026 season
°	Driver is competing part-time in the 2026 season
^	Driver has been inducted into the NASCAR Hall of Fame

Rank	Driver	Wins
1	Jack McCoy*	54
2	Ray Elder*	47
3	Hershel McGriff* ^	34
4	Jimmy Insolo*	25
5	Bill Amick*	21
6	Eddie Gray*	20
7	Bill Schmitt*	19
7	Greg Pursley*	19
9	Bill Sedgwick*	17
9	Eric Holmes*	17
11	Parnelli Jones	15
11	Roy Smith*	15
11	Austin Cameron	15
14	Dick Bown	14
15	Ron Hornaday Sr.*	13
15	Butch Gilliland*	13
15	Todd Gilliland*	13
18	Danny Letner*	12
18	Lloyd Dane*	12
20	Jim Reed	11
20	Marvin Porter*	11
20	Scotty Cain*	11
20	Ron Eaton	11
20	Jim Robinson*	11
20	Ken Schrader	11
20	Trevor Huddleston* #	11
27	Mike Chase*	10
27	Derek Kraus*	10
29	Eddie Pagan	9
29	Rick Carelli*	9
29	Scott Lynch*	9
29	Jason Bowles*	9
29	Chris Eggleston*	9
34	Sonny Easley	8
34	Brendan Gaughan*	8
34	Mike Duncan*	8
34	Michael Self	8
38	Don Noel	7
38	Jim Bown	7
38	Sean Woodside*	7
38	Steve Portenga	7
38	David Mayhew	7
38	Derek Thorn*	7
38	Sean Hingorani* °	7
45	Harry Jefferson	6
45	Ron Hornaday Jr.	6
45	Doug George*	6
45	Kevin Harvick*	6
45	Mike David*	6
50	Marvin Panch	5
50	Chuck Meekins	5
50	Jim Cook	5
50	Dan Gurney	5
50	Johnny Steele	5
50	Ernie Stierly	5
50	Chad Little*	5
50	David Gilliland	5
50	Dylan Kwasniewski*	5
50	Noah Gragson	5
50	Ryan Partridge	5
50	Jesse Love*	5
50	Taylor Gray	5
50	William Sawalich	5
50	Hailie Deegan #	5
64	Bob Ross*	4
64	Cliff Garner	4
64	Derrike Cope	4
64	Lance Hooper*	4
64	Kevin Richards	4
64	Bobby Dotter	4
64	Jake Drew*	4
72	Allen Adkins	3
72	Herb Thomas ^	3
72	Danny Graves	3
72	Jack D. McCoy	3
72	Marty Kinerk	3
72	Chuck Bown*	3
72	Gary Johnson	3
72	Richard Petty ^	3
72	Bobby Allison ^	3
71	Dirk Stephens	3
72	Gary Smith	3
72	Eric Norris*	3
72	Johnny Borneman III	3
72	Brian Ickler	3
72	Paulie Harraka	3
72	Ty Gibbs	3
72	Blaine Perkins	3
72	Tanner Reif	3
72	Tyler Reif	3
91	Tim Flock ^	2
91	Clyde Palmer	2
91	John Rostek	2
91	Clem Proctor	2
91	Darel Dieringer	2
91	Carl Joiner	2
91	Harold Hardesty	2
91	Chuck Wahl	2
91	Jim Thirkettle	2
91	Neal Newberry	2
91	Jim Reich	2
91	Sumner McKnight	2
91	Tim Williamson	2
91	Rick McCray	2
91	Gary Collins	2
91	Ernie Cope	2
91	Joe Bean	2
91	Mike Wallace	2
91	Mark Reed	2
91	Jim Inglebright	2
91	Burney Lamar	2
91	Andrew Myers	2
91	Joey Logano	2
91	Jason Fensler	2
91	Patrick Long	2
91	Andrew Ranger	2
91	Dylan Lupton	2
91	James Bickford	2
91	Brandon McReynolds	2
91	Kody Vanderwal	2
91	Sam Mayer	2
91	Sammy Smith	2
91	Landen Lewis	2
91	Kaden Honeycutt	2
91	Brent Crews	2
91	Mason Massey #	2
91	Cole Denton #	2
130	Dick Rathmann	1
130	John Soares	1
130	Bob Caswell	1
130	Norm Nelson	1
130	Chuck Stevenson	1
130	Buck Baker ^	1
130	Dempsey Wilson	1
130	John Kieper	1
130	Royce Hagerty	1
130	Art Watts	1
130	Marshall Sargent	1
130	Danny Weinberg	1
130	Fireball Roberts	1
130	Roger Penske	1
130	Bob Perry	1
130	Kuzie Kuzmanich	1
130	Clyde Prickett	1
130	Dave James	1
130	Tiny Lund	1
130	John Soares Jr.	1
130	Johnny Anderson	1
130	Bob Kauf	1
130	Jim Boyd	1
130	Bill Cheesbourg	1
130	Vic Irvan	1
130	Glen Stuart	1
130	Jim Walker	1
130	Art Roth	1
130	Cale Yarborough	1
130	John Borneman	1
130	John Krebs	1
130	Jack Jeffrey	1
130	Neil Bonnett	1
130	Ivan Baldwin	1
130	Scott Miller	1
130	Ruben Garcia	1
130	Dale Earnhardt ^	1
130	Bill Elliott ^	1
130	Geoff Bodine	1
130	Larry Gunselman	1
130	Mark Krogh	1
130	Michael Waltrip	1
130	Rich Woodland Jr.	1
130	Andy Houston	1
130	Jerry Nadeau	1
130	Ricky Craven	1
130	David Starr	1
130	Johnny Benson Jr.	1
130	Jeff Jefferson	1
130	Tavo Hellmund	1
130	Frank Kimmel	1
130	Sammy Potashnick	1
130	Brandon Ash	1
130	Brett Thompson	1
130	Brian Vickers	1
130	Peyton Sellers	1
130	Jeff Barkshire	1
130	Todd Souza °	1
130	Auggie Vidovich	1
130	Luis Martinez Jr.	1
130	Ryan Blaney	1
130	Cameron Hayley	1
130	Gray Gaulding	1
130	Cole Custer	1
130	Patrick Staropoli °	1
130	Kyle Larson	1
130	Christian PaHud	1
130	Nick Drake	1
130	Dalton Sargeant	1
130	Gracin Raz	1
130	Chase Elliott	1
130	Will Rodgers	1
130	Sheldon Creed	1
130	Cole Rouse	1
130	Jagger Jones	1
130	Gracie Trotter	1
130	Gio Scelzi	1
130	Chase Briscoe	1
130	Joey Iest °	1
130	P. J. Pedroncelli	1
130	Cole Moore	1
130	Ryan Preece	1
130	Dylan Cappello	1
130	Kole Raz	1
130	Connor Zilisch	1
130	Jake Bollman °	1
130	Kyle Keller °	1
130	Robbie Kennealy #	1
130	Carson Brown °	1
130	Sam Corry °	1
130	Ethan Nascimento °	1
130	Taylor Mayhew °	1
130	Max Reaves °	1

== See also ==
- ARCA Menards Series
- ARCA Menards Series East
- List of NASCAR series
- List of auto racing tracks in the United States
- West Coast Stock Car/Motorsports Hall of Fame, a stock car hall of fame featuring many of the series' champions.
