= Johnny Borneman III =

American racing driver (born 1977)

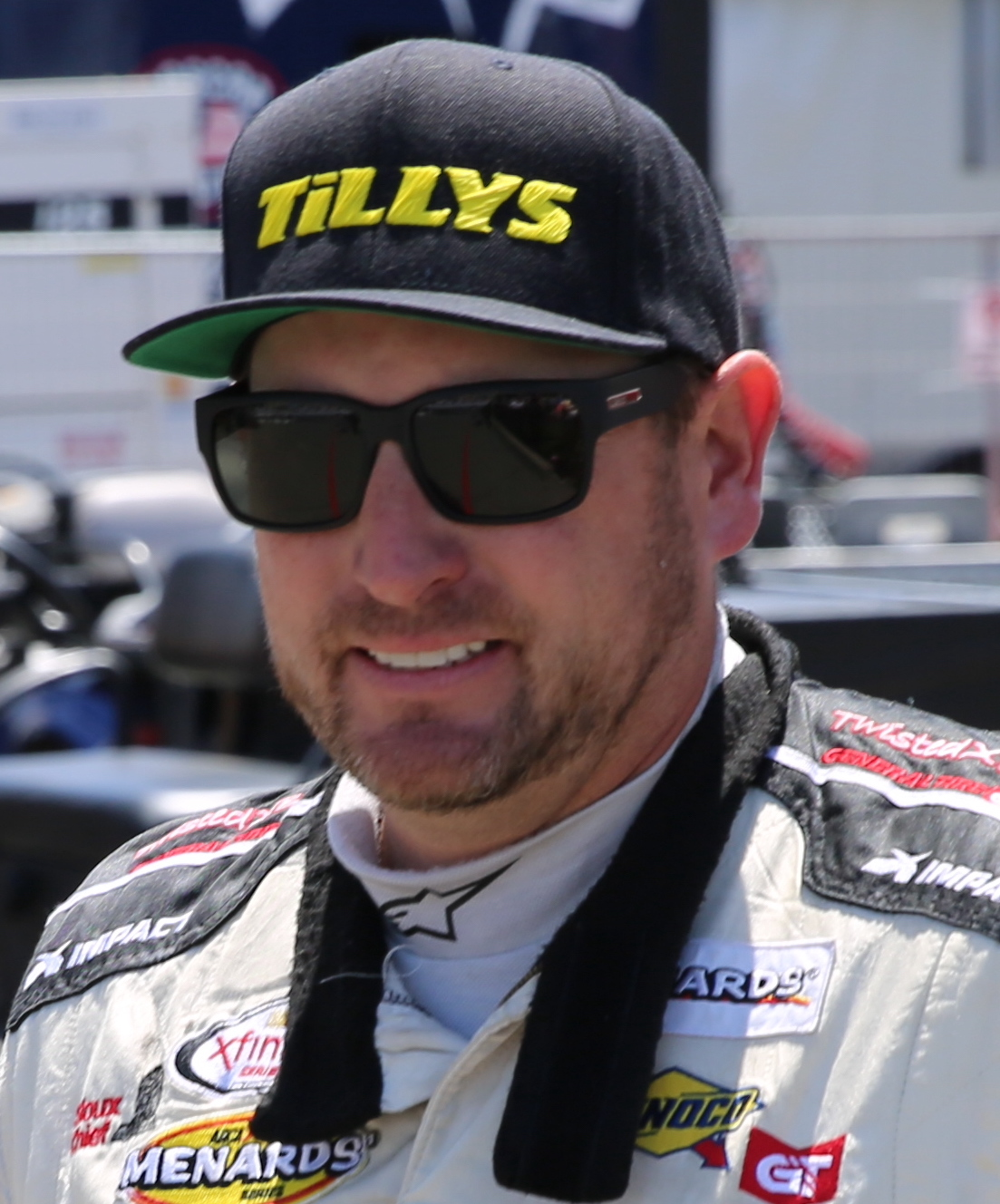
- Borneman at Sonoma Raceway in 2024
- Born: John Borneman III; June 30, 1977 (age 49) Ramona, California, U.S.
- Relatives: John Borneman Jr. (father)

ARCA Menards Series West career
- Debut season: 2000
- Current team: Lowden Jackson Motorsports
- Car number: 41
- Engine: Chevrolet
- Crew chief: Will Harris
- Former teams: Thompson Motorsports
- Starts: 127
- Championships: 0
- Wins: 3
- Poles: 1
- Best finish: 4th in 2002
- Finished last season: 22nd (2017)

Previous series
- 2000–2002 2005: ARCA Racing Series; Nextel Cup Series

NASCAR O'Reilly Auto Parts Series career
- 20 races run over 6 years
- Best finish: 68th (2008, 2010)
- First race: 2004 Federated Auto Parts 300 (Nashville)
- Last race: 2010 WYPALL* 200 Powered by Kimberly-Clark Professional (Phoenix)
Wins	Top tens	Poles
0	1	0

NASCAR FedEx Freight Truck Series career
- 2 races run over 2 years
- Best finish: 108th (2003)
- First race: 2003 O'Reilly 400K (Texas)
- Last race: 2011 Smith's 350 (Las Vegas)
Wins	Top tens	Poles
0	0	0
- Statistics up to date as of June 16, 2024.

John Borneman III (born June 30, 1977) is an American stock car racing driver. He last competed part-time in the ARCA Menards Series West, driving the No. 41 Ford for Lowden Jackson Motorsports.

== Personal life ==
Borneman was born in Ramona, California. His father is John Borneman Jr., a Whelen All-American Series champion who also competed in the NASCAR Cup, Truck, and West Series like his son.

Borneman finances his racing career with the money he makes from his construction business.

== Motorsports career results ==
=== NASCAR ===
(key) (Bold – Pole position awarded by qualifying time. Italics – Pole position earned by points standings or practice time. * – Most laps led. ** – All laps led.)

==== Nextel Cup Series ====
NASCAR Nextel Cup Series results
Year	Team	No.	Make	1	2	3	4	5	6	7	8	9	10	11	12	13	14	15	16	17	18	19	20	21	22	23	24	25	26	27	28	29	30	31	32	33	34	35	36	NNCC	Pts	Ref
2005	Peak Fitness Racing	66	Ford	DAY	CAL	LVS	ATL	BRI	MAR	TEX	PHO	TAL	DAR	RCH	CLT	DOV	POC	MCH	SON; DNQ	DAY	CHI	NHA	POC	IND	GLN	MCH	BRI	CAL	RCH	NHA	DOV	TAL	KAN	CLT	MAR	ATL	TEX	PHO	HOM	N/A	0	

==== Nationwide Series ====
NASCAR Nationwide Series results
Year	Team	No.	Make	1	2	3	4	5	6	7	8	9	10	11	12	13	14	15	16	17	18	19	20	21	22	23	24	25	26	27	28	29	30	31	32	33	34	35	NNSC	Pts	Ref
2004	Team Rensi Motorsports	35	Ford	DAY	CAR	LVS	DAR	BRI	TEX	NSH	TAL	CAL; DNQ	GTY	RCH	NZH	CLT	DOV	NSH; 30	KEN	MLW	DAY	CHI	NHA	PPR	IRP	MCH	BRI	CAL	RCH	DOV	KAN	CLT	MEM	ATL					129th	73	
2004	Borneman Motorsports	83	Ford																																PHO; DNQ	DAR	HOM		129th	73	
2005	Borneman Motorsports	88	Ford	DAY	CAL	MXC	LVS	ATL	NSH	BRI	TEX	PHO	TAL	DAR	RCH	CLT	DOV	NSH; DNQ																					N/A	0	
2005	Borneman Motorsports	83	Chevy																KEN; DNQ	MLW	DAY	CHI	NHA	PPR	GTY	IRP	GLN	MCH	BRI	CAL	RCH	DOV	KAN	CLT	MEM	TEX	PHO	HOM	N/A	0	
2007	Mike Harmon Racing	44	Chevy	DAY	CAL	MXC	LVS	ATL	BRI	NSH	TEX	PHO	TAL	RCH	DAR	CLT	DOV	NSH	KEN	MLW	NHA	DAY	CHI	GTY	IRP	CGV	GLN	MCH	BRI	CAL; 42	RCH	DOV	KAN	CLT	MEM	TEX	PHO	HOM	156th	37	
2008	Borneman Motorsports	83	Ford	DAY	CAL; 29	LVS; 20	ATL	BRI	NSH	TEX	PHO; 33	MXC	TAL	RCH	DAR	CLT	DOV	NSH	KEN	MLW	NHA	DAY	CHI	GTY	IRP	CGV	GLN	MCH	BRI	CAL; 29	RCH	DOV	KAN	CLT	MEM	TEX	PHO; 28	HOM	68th	398	
2009	Trail Motorsports	22	Ford	DAY; DNQ	CAL; DNQ	LVS; DNQ	BRI	TEX	NSH																														69th	604	
2009	Borneman Motorsports	83	Ford							PHO; 30	TAL; 26	RCH	DAR	CLT	DOV	NSH	KEN	MLW	NHA	DAY; 25	CHI	GTY	IRP	IOW; 16	GLN	MCH	BRI	CGV	ATL	RCH	DOV	KAN	CAL; 22	CLT	MEM	TEX; 34	PHO; 26	HOM; DNQ	69th	604	
2010	Borneman Motorsports	83	Dodge	DAY; DNQ							TAL; 5	RCH	DAR	DOV	CLT	NSH	KEN	ROA	NHA	DAY	CHI	GTY	IRP																68th	496	
2010	Borneman Motorsports	83	Ford		CAL; 43	LVS; DNQ	BRI	NSH	PHO; 36	TEX														IOW; 25	GLN	MCH	BRI	CGV	ATL	RCH	DOV	KAN	CAL; 24	CLT	GTY	TEX	PHO; 30	HOM	68th	496	

==== Camping World Truck Series ====
NASCAR Camping World Truck Series results
Year	Team	No.	Make	1	2	3	4	5	6	7	8	9	10	11	12	13	14	15	16	17	18	19	20	21	22	23	24	25	NCWTC	Pts	Ref
2003	Borneman Motorsports	81	Ford	DAY	DAR	MMR	MAR	CLT	DOV	TEX; 23	MEM	MLW	KAN	KEN	GTW	MCH	IRP	NSH	BRI	RCH	NHA	CAL	LVS	SBO	TEX	MAR	PHO	HOM	108th	94	
2011	Norm Benning Racing	75	Chevy	DAY	PHO	DAR	MAR	NSH	DOV	CLT	KAN	TEX	KEN	IOW	NSH	IRP	POC	MCH	BRI	ATL	CHI	NHA	KEN	LVS; 34	TAL	MAR	TEX	HOM	111th	-	

=== ARCA Menards Series ===
(key) (Bold – Pole position awarded by qualifying time. Italics – Pole position earned by points standings or practice time. * – Most laps led.)

ARCA Menards Series results
Year	Team	No.	Make	1	2	3	4	5	6	7	8	9	10	11	12	13	14	15	16	17	18	19	20	21	22	23	24	25	AMSC	Pts	Ref
2000	Borneman Motorsports	81	Ford	DAY	SLM	AND	CLT	KIL	FRS	MCH	POC	TOL	KEN	BLN	POC	WIN	ISF	KEN; 36	DSF	SLM	CLT	TAL	ATL						140th	50	
2001	Borneman Motorsports	81	Ford	DAY	NSH	WIN	SLM	GTY	KEN	CLT	KAN; 31	MCH	POC	MEM	GLN	KEN	MCH	POC	NSH	ISF	CHI	DSF	SLM	TOL	BLN	CLT	TAL	ATL	170th	75	
2002	Borneman Motorsports	88	Ford	DAY	ATL	NSH	SLM	KEN	CLT; 37	KAN	POC	MCH	TOL	SBO	KEN	BLN	POC	NSH	ISF	WIN	DSF	CHI	SLM	TAL	CLT				N/A	0	
2024	Lowden Jackson Motorsports	41	Ford	DAY	PHO; 33	TAL	DOV	KAN	CLT	IOW	MOH	BLN	IRP	SLM	ELK	MCH	ISF	MLW	DSF	GLN	BRI	KAN	TOL						115th	11	

==== ARCA Menards Series West ====
ARCA Menards Series West results
Year	Team	No.	Make	1	2	3	4	5	6	7	8	9	10	11	12	13	14	15	AMSWC	Pts	Ref
2000	Borneman Motorsports	81	Ford	PHO; 8	MMR														20th	723	
2000	Borneman Motorsports	8	Ford			LVS; 7	CAL; 10	LAG; 3*	IRW; 14	POR	EVG	IRW	RMR	MMR	IRW				20th	723	
2001	Borneman Motorsports	8	Ford	PHO; 16	LVS; 7	TUS; 1	MMR; 13	CAL; 14	IRW; 7	LAG; 15	KAN; 16	EVG; 7		IRW; 2	RMR; 6	LVS; 11	IRW; 25		7th	1873	
2001	Borneman Motorsports	8	Chevy										CNS; 13						7th	1873	
2002	Borneman Motorsports	8	Ford	PHO; 8	LVS; 23	CAL; 10	KAN; 10	EVG; 2	IRW; 5	S99; 1**	RMR; 8	DCS; 8	LVS; 7						4th	1459	
2003	Borneman Motorsports	8	Ford	PHO; 11	LVS; 13	**CAL**; 4	MAD; 3	TCR; 13	EVG; 7	IRW; 13	S99; 5	RMR; 16	DCS; 19	PHO; 9	MMR; 5				8th	1657	
2004	Borneman Motorsports	8	Ford	PHO; 29	MMR	CAL; 18*	S99	EVG	IRW; 5	S99	RMR	DCS	PHO; 3	CNS	MMR	IRW; 25			21st	618	
2005	Borneman Motorsports	8	Ford	PHO; 15	MMR	PHO; 21	S99	IRW; 17	EVG	S99	PPR; 3	CAL; 2	DCS	CTS	MMR				17th	670	
2006	Borneman Motorsports	8	Ford	PHO; 11	PHO; 33	S99; 2	IRW; 11	SON; 28	DCS; 15	IRW; 3	EVG; 1	S99; 18	CAL; 23	CTS; 4	AMP; 3				10th	1569	
2007	Borneman Motorsports	8	Ford	CTS; 11	PHO; 12	AMP; 8*	ELK; 8	IOW; 2	CNS; 16	SON; 11	DCS; 2	IRW; 9	MMP; 4	EVG; 10	CSR; 7	AMP; 23			5th	1813	
2008	Borneman Motorsports	8	Ford	AAS; 4		CTS; 20	IOW; 13	CNS; 20	SON; 26	IRW; 3	DCS; 2	EVG; 6	MMP; 17			AAS; 18			9th	1699	
2008	Borneman Motorsports	8	Chevy		PHO; 15									IRW; 6	AMP; 6				9th	1699	
2009	Borneman Motorsports	8	Chevy	CTS	AAS	PHO; 27	MAD	IOW; 5	DCS	SON; 5	IRW; 13	PIR	MMP	CNS	IOW	AAS			24th	521	
2010	Borneman Motorsports	8	Chevy	AAS	PHO; 24	IOW	DCS	SON	IRW	PIR	MRP	CNS	MMP	AAS	PHO; 40				61st	134	
2011	Borneman Motorsports	8	Chevy	PHO; DNQ	AAS	MMP	IOW										PHO; 9		21st	582	
2011	Borneman Motorsports	8	Ford					LVS; 21	SON; 8	IRW; 6	EVG	PIR	CNS	MRP	SPO	AAS			21st	582	
2012	Borneman Motorsports	8	Chevy	PHO; 30	LHC	MMP	S99	IOW	BIR	LVS								PHO; 29	51st	43	
2012	Thompson Motorsports	61	Chevy								SON	EVG; 30	CNS	IOW	PIR	SMP	AAS		51st	43	
2013	Borneman Motorsports	8	Chevy	PHO	S99	BIR	IOW	L44	SON; 29	CNS	IOW	EVG	SPO	MMP	SMP	AAS		PHO; 12	33rd	79	
2013	Borneman Motorsports	8	Ford														KCR; 12		33rd	79	
2014	Borneman Motorsports	8	Chevy	PHO	IRW	S99	IOW	KCR	SON	SLS	CNS	IOW	EVG	KCR	MMP	AAS	PHO; 23		33rd	73	
2015	Borneman Motorsports	8	Toyota	KCR; 25		TUS; 7	IOW	SHA				EVG; 16	CNS	MER	AAS				19th	150	
2015	Borneman Motorsports	8	Ford		IRW; 22														19th	150	
2015	Borneman Motorsports	8	Chevy						SON; 11	SLS	IOW					PHO; DNQ			19th	150	
2016	Thompson Motorsports	61	Ford	IRW; 5	KCR; 9	TUS	OSS	CNS	SON	SLS	IOW	EVG	DCS	MMP	MMP	MER; 29	AAS		27th	89	
2017	Thompson Motorsports	61	Ford	TUS	KCR; 11	IRW; 8	IRW; 13	SPO	OSS	CNS	SON; 18	IOW	EVG	DCS	MER	AAS	KCR		22nd	126	
2020	Borneman Motorsports	8	Ford	LVS	MMP	MMP	IRW; 6	EVG	DCS	CNS	LVS	AAS	KCR	PHO					34th	38	
2021	Borneman Motorsports	8	Ford	PHO	SON	IRW; 8	CNS	IRW; 18	PIR	LVS	AAS	PHO; 20							24th	86	
2023	Borneman Motorsports	8	Ford	PHO	IRW	KCR	PIR	SON; 9	IRW	SHA	EVG	AAS	LVS	MAD					31st	58th	
2023	Lowden Jackson Motorsports	41	Ford												PHO; 21				31st	58th	
2024	Lowden Jackson Motorsports	41	Ford	PHO; 33	KER; 11	PIR	SON; 24	IRW; Wth	IRW; Wth	SHA	TRI	MAD	AAS	KER	PHO				31st	64	

^{*} Season still in progress
