= Scott Lynch (racing driver) =

American racing driver (born 1980)

- Born: May 4, 1980 (age 46); Burley, Idaho, U.S.

NASCAR O'Reilly Auto Parts Series career
- 3 races run over 4 years
- Best finish: 140th (2004)
- First race: 2004 Funai 250 (Richmond)
- Last race: 2008 Stater Brothers 300 (Fontana)
Wins	Top tens	Poles
0	0	0

NASCAR FedEx Freight Truck Series career
- 23 races run over 6 years
- Best finish: 35th (2007)
- First race: 2003 Las Vegas 350 (Las Vegas)
- Last race: 2008 San Bernardino County 200 (Fontana)
Wins	Top tens	Poles
0	0	0
- Statistics up to date as of November 7, 2024.

Scott Lynch (born May 4, 1980) is an American former professional stock car racing driver who has previously competed in the NASCAR Busch Series, and the NASCAR Craftsman Truck Series. He is a former champion of the NASCAR Winston West Series, having won the championship in 2003.

Lynch has also competed in series such as the NASCAR Busch East Series, the NASCAR Southwest Series, and the NASCAR Northwest Series.

== Motorsports career results ==
=== NASCAR ===
(key) (Bold - Pole position awarded by qualifying time. Italics - Pole position earned by points standings or practice time. * – Most laps led.)

==== Nationwide Series ====
NASCAR Nationwide Series results
Year	Team	No.	Make	1	2	3	4	5	6	7	8	9	10	11	12	13	14	15	16	17	18	19	20	21	22	23	24	25	26	27	28	29	30	31	32	33	34	35	NNSC	Pts	Ref
2003	Windward Racing Enterprises	08	Dodge	DAY	CAR	LVS; DNQ	DAR	BRI	TEX	TAL	NSH	CAL	RCH	GTY	NZH	CLT	DOV	NSH	KEN	MLW	DAY	CHI	NHA	PPR	IRP	MCH	BRI	DAR	RCH	DOV	KAN	CLT	MEM	ATL	PHO	CAR	HOM		N/A	0	
2004	Tommy Baldwin Racing	6	Dodge	DAY	CAR	LVS	DAR	BRI	TEX	NSH	TAL	CAL	GTY	RCH; 39	NZH	CLT	DOV	NSH	KEN	MLW	DAY	CHI	NHA	PPR	IRP	MCH	BRI	CAL	RCH	DOV	KAN	CLT; DNQ	MEM	ATL	PHO	DAR	HOM		140th	51	
2006	Frank Cicci Racing	34	Chevy	DAY	CAL	MXC	LVS	ATL; 43	BRI	TEX	NSH	PHO	TAL	RCH	DAR	CLT	DOV	NSH	KEN	MLW	DAY	CHI	NHA	MAR	GTY	IRP	GLN	MCH	BRI	CAL	RCH	DOV	KAN	CLT	MEM	TEX	PHO	HOM	147th	34	
2008	MSRP Motorsports	90	Chevy	DAY	CAL; 41	LVS	ATL	BRI	NSH	TEX	PHO	MXC	TAL	RCH	DAR	CLT	DOV	NSH	KEN	MLW	NHA	DAY	CHI	GTY	IRP	CGV	GLN	MCH	BRI	CAL	RCH	DOV	KAN	CLT	MEM	TEX	PHO	HOM	145th	40	

==== Craftsman Truck Series ====
NASCAR Craftsman Truck Series results
Year	Team	No.	Make	1	2	3	4	5	6	7	8	9	10	11	12	13	14	15	16	17	18	19	20	21	22	23	24	25	NCTC	Pts	Ref
2003	Orleans Racing	61	Dodge	DAY	DAR	MMR	MAR	CLT	DOV	TEX	MEM	MLW	KAN	KEN	GTW	MCH	IRP	NSH	BRI	RCH	NHA	CAL	LVS; 12	SBO	TEX	MAR	PHO	HOM; 12	74th	254	
2004	Orleans Racing	61	Dodge	DAY	ATL	MAR	MFD	CLT	DOV	TEX	MEM	MLW	KAN	KEN	GTW	MCH	IRP	NSH	BRI	RCH	NHA	LVS; 19	CAL	TEX	MAR				65th	188	
2004	HT Motorsports	59	Dodge																							PHO; 27	DAR	HOM; DNQ	65th	188	
2005	Orleans Racing	62	Dodge	DAY	CAL	ATL	MAR	GTY	MFD	CLT	DOV	TEX	MCH	MLW	KAN	KEN	MEM	IRP	NSH	BRI	RCH	NHA	LVS	MAR; 30	ATL; 25	TEX; 23	PHO; 18	HOM; 17	45th	476	
2006	MB Motorsports	63	Ford	DAY	CAL	ATL	MAR	GTY	CLT	MFD	DOV	TEX	MCH	MLW	KAN	KEN	MEM	IRP	NSH	BRI	NHA	LVS; 35	TAL	MAR	ATL	TEX	PHO	HOM	88th	58	
2007	MB Motorsports	63	Ford	DAY	CAL	ATL	MAR	KAN; 20	CLT	MFD	DOV; 27	TEX	MCH				IRP; 31	NSH	BRI	GTW; 26					ATL; 33	TEX; 28			35th	893	
2007	Windward Racing Enterprises	29	Dodge											MLW; 33	MEM	KEN					NHA; 31	LVS; 19	TAL	MAR; 24			PHO; 28		35th	893	
2007	Windward Racing Enterprises	63	Dodge																									HOM; DNQ	35th	893	
2008	Windward Racing Enterprises	29	Dodge	DAY; 16	CAL; 31	ATL	MAR	KAN	CLT	MFD	DOV	TEX	MCH	MLW	MEM	KEN	IRP	NSH	BRI	GTW	NHA	LVS	TAL	MAR	ATL	TEX	PHO	HOM	64th	185	

==== Busch East Series ====
NASCAR Busch East Series results
Year	Team	No.	Make	1	2	3	4	5	6	7	8	9	10	11	12	13	NBESC	Pts	Ref
2007	Windward Racing Enterprises	29	Dodge	GRE	ELK	IOW	SBO	STA	NHA	TMP	NSH	ADI	LRP	MFD	NHA; 34	DOV	73rd	61	

==== West Series ====
NASCAR West Series results
Year	Team	No.	Make	1	2	3	4	5	6	7	8	9	10	11	12	13	14	NWSC	Pts	Ref
2000	Windward Racing Enterprises	08	Chevy	PHO	MMR	LVS	CAL	LAG	IRW	POR	EVG	IRW	RMR	MMR	IRW; 9			50th	138	
2001	Windward Racing Enterprises	08	Chevy	PHO; 7	LVS	TUS	MMR	CAL; 17	IRW	LAG	KAN	EVG	CNS	IRW; 12	RMR	LVS; 15	IRW; 3	21st	673	
2002	Windward Racing Enterprises	08	Chevy	PHO; 12	LVS	CAL; 8	KAN; 8	EVG	IRW	S99	RMR; 4	DCS	LVS; 1					14th	756	
2003	Windward Racing Enterprises	08	Dodge	PHO; 2	LVS; 9	CAL; 13	MAD; 4	TCR; 11	EVG; 6	**IRW**; 1*	S99; 9	RMR; 1	DCS; 3	**PHO**; 1	MMR; 4			1st	1890	
2004	Windward Racing Enterprises	08	Dodge	PHO; 27	MMR; 3	CAL; 3	S99; 10	EVG; 7	IRW; 23	S99; 21	RMR; 2*	DCS; 1	PHO; 1*	**CNS**; 12	MMR; 9	**IRW**; 7		5th	1877	
2005	Windward Racing Enterprises	08	Dodge	PHO; 10	MMR; 1	PHO; 2	**S99**; 1*	IRW; 2	EVG; 3	**S99**; 2	PPR; 2	CAL; 4	DCS; 2	CTS; 15	MMR; 17			3rd	1899	
2007	Windward Racing Enterprises	29	Dodge	CTS; 1*	PHO	AMP	ELK	IOW; 18	CNS	SON	DCS	IRW	MMP	EVG	CSR	AMP		35th	299	
