= Andrew Lewis (racing driver) =

American racing driver (born 1987)

- Born: January 19, 1987 (age 39); Corona, California, U.S.
- Awards: 2005 NASCAR West Series Rookie of the Year

ARCA Menards Series West career
- 13 races run over 2 years
- Best finish: 10th (2005)
- First race: 2005 United Rentals 100 (Phoenix)
- Last race: 2006 United Rentals 125 (Phoenix)
Wins	Top tens	Poles
0	5	0
- Statistics up to date as of April 14, 2026.

Andrew Lewis (born January 19, 1987) is an American former professional stock car racing driver. He competed in the NASCAR AutoZone West Series, winning rookie of the year in 2005.

== Racing career ==
Lewis raced legends cars at The Bullring at Las Vegas Motor Speedway in 2002. Lewis competed in eight races in the Speed Truck Challenge series in 2002, scoring two top-tens, both runner-up finishes. He ran nine races the following season, scoring two wins at Mesa Marin Raceway and one at Irwindale Speedway. In 2005, Lewis joined Bill McAnally Racing to contest the full NASCAR West Series schedule. Lewis scored one top-five and five top-tens across twelve racing, finishing tenth in the standings. He was the rookie of the year for the season. Despite this, he ran only the season opener in 2006, where, in his self-owned entry, he finished in last after ignition issues took him out of the race after five laps. In 2007, Lewis ran three races in the Grand-Am KONI Challenge Series, driving a Volkswagen GTI at Daytona International Speedway and Homestead–Miami Speedway and a Acura TSX at Mid-Ohio Sports Car Course. He drove a B-mod in the Bragging Rights Championship in 2015.

== Motorsports career results ==
=== NASCAR ===
(key) (Bold - Pole position awarded by qualifying time. Italics - Pole position earned by points standings or practice time. * – Most laps led.)

==== AutoZone West Series ====
NASCAR AutoZone West Series results
Year	Team	No.	Make	1	2	3	4	5	6	7	8	9	10	11	12	NAWSC	Pts	Ref
2005	Bill McAnally Racing	18	Chevy	PHO; 16	MMR; 9	PHO; 17	S99; 8	IRW; 18	EVG; 5	S99; 6	PPR; 12	CAL; 18	DCS; 13	CTS; 8	MMR; 15	10th	1541	
2006	Andrew Lewis Racing	19	Chevy	PHO; 34	PHO	S99	IRW	SON	DCS	IRW	EVG	S99	CAL	CTS	AMP	77th	61	
