= Andrew Myers (racing driver) =

American racing driver (born 1980)

- Born: February 8, 1980 (age 46); Newport Beach, California, U.S.

NASCAR FedEx Freight Truck Series career
- 2 races run over 1 year
- Best finish: 81st (2007)
- First race: 2007 Casino Arizona 150 (Phoenix)
- Last race: 2007 Ford 200 (Homestead–Miami)
Wins	Top tens	Poles
0	0	0

ARCA Menards Series career
- 3 races run over 1 year
- Best finish: 92nd (2006)
- First race: 2006 Daytona ARCA 200 (Daytona)
- Last race: 2006 Harley-Davidson of Cincinnati 150 (Kentucky)
Wins	Top tens	Poles
0	0	0

ARCA Menards Series East career
- 3 races run over 1 year
- Best finish: 33rd (2006)
- First race: 2006 New England 125 (New Hampshire)
- Last race: 2006 Sunoco 150 (Dover)
Wins	Top tens	Poles
0	1	0

ARCA Menards Series West career
- 42 races run over 7 years
- Best finish: 9th (2005)
- First race: 2005 United Rentals 100 (Phoenix)
- Last race: 2011 Southern California Toyota Dealers 200 (Irwindale)
- First win: 2006 Casino Arizona 150 (Phoenix)
- Last win: 2006 King Taco 200 (Irwindale)
Wins	Top tens	Poles
2	15	2
- Statistics up to date as of April 13, 2026.

Andrew Myers (born February 8, 1980) is an American former professional stock car racing driver. He competed in the NASCAR Craftsman Truck Series, ARCA Re/Max Series, NASCAR Busch East Series, and NASCAR K&N Pro Series West.

== Racing career ==
Myers, who first raced off-road, took up stock car racing in 2003, trading his Class 1 off-road buggy for a late model stock car and began racing at Irwindale Speedway. He debuted in the NASCAR West Series in 2005 at Phoenix Raceway, finishing 17th. He ran the complete schedule, scoring a pole, two top-fives, and six top-tens, finishing the season ninth in the points standings. In 2006, he made his ARCA Re/Max Series debut at Daytona International Speedway, where he was involved in a four car accident and flipped into the infield. He competed in the following race at Nashville Superspeedway, finishing 19th. He made his final ARCA start at Kentucky Speedway, leading five laps and finishing 25th. He also made starts in the NASCAR Busch East Series, running two races at New Hampshire Motor Speedway, leading laps in the first and finishing in fourth in the second, as well as in the race at Dover Motor Speedway, where he crashed out after 21 laps. He ran all but one race in the NASCAR AutoZone West Series, scoring wins at Phoenix International Raceway and Irwindale Speedway. He struggled the remainder of the season, failing to finish most races. In 2007 he ran nine races, with a best finish of second at Altamont Motorsports Park. He would also make his NASCAR Craftsman Truck Series debut at Phoenix for Billy Ballew Motorsports, finishing 30th. He drove for the team in the following race at Homestead–Miami Speedway, finishing 34th. He ran five West races in 2008, scoring a best finish of eighth at Iowa Speedway, although this was only in class, as it was a combination race with the NASCAR Camping World East Series, and is overall finish was 22nd. He scored a top-ten in his last start of the season at Irwindale. Myers also won seven races at Irwindale in a late model that year. In 2009, Myers ran only two races in the now renamed Camping World West Series, finishing sixth at Phoenix and 12th at Irwindale. He scored two wins at Irwindale in a late model. He made only one start in 2010, winning the pole at Phoenix and leading for nine laps, but would crash out of the race and finish 27th. Myers made his final two starts in 2011, finishing 17th at Phoenix and ninth in his final career start at Irwindale. After leaving stock car racing, Myers has continued to compete in off-road racing.

== Motorsports career results ==
=== NASCAR ===
(key) (Bold – Pole position awarded by qualifying time. Italics – Pole position earned by points standings or practice time. * – Most laps led.)

==== Craftsman Truck Series ====
NASCAR Craftsman Truck Series results
Year	Team	No.	Make	1	2	3	4	5	6	7	8	9	10	11	12	13	14	15	16	17	18	19	20	21	22	23	24	25	NCTC	Pts	Ref
2007	Billy Ballew Motorsports	15	Chevy	DAY	CAL	ATL	MAR	KAN	CLT	MFD	DOV	TEX	MCH	MLW	MEM	KEN	IRP	NSH	BRI	GTW	NHA	LVS	TAL	MAR	ATL	TEX	PHO; 30	HOM; 34	81st	134	

==== Busch East Series ====
NASCAR Busch East Series results
Year	Team	No.	Make	1	2	3	4	5	6	7	8	9	10	11	NBSEC	Pts	Ref
2006	Gary Myers	4	Chevy	GRE	STA	HOL	TMP	ERI	NHA; 15	ADI	WFD	NHA; 4	DOV; 29	LRP	33rd	359	

==== K&N Pro Series West ====
NASCAR K&N Pro Series West results
Year	Team	No.	Make	1	2	3	4	5	6	7	8	9	10	11	12	13	14	NKNPSWC	Pts	Ref
2005	Nancy Myers	44	Chevy	PHO; 17	MMR; 14	PHO; 9	S99; 18	IRW; 7	EVG; 13	S99; 9	**PPR**; 14	CAL; 21	DCS; 7	CTS; 4	MMR; 3			9th	1590	
2006	Nancy Myers	44	Chevy	PHO; 21	PHO; 1	S99	IRW; 1*	SON; 10	DCS; 18	IRW; 25	EVG; 18	S99; 20	CAL; 18	CTS; 18	AMP; 18			14th	1350	
2007	Nancy Myers	44	Chevy	CTS; 9	PHO; 26	AMP; 2						IRW; 13			CSR; 8	AMP		15th	1064	
2007	Nancy Myers	14	Chevy				ELK; 12	IOW; 16	CNS									15th	1064	
2007	Nancy Myers	44	Toyota							SON; 16	DCS		MMP; 18	EVG				15th	1064	
2008	Performance P–1 Motorsports	77	Toyota	AAS	PHO; 31	CTS			SON; 17					IRW; 10	AMP	AAS		22nd	585	
2008	Performance P–1 Motorsports	77	Ford				IOW; 8	CNS		IRW; 12	DCS	EVG	MMP					22nd	585	
2009	Performance P–1 Motorsports	77	Toyota	CTS	AAS	PHO; 6	MAD	IOW	DCS	SON	IRW; 12	PIR	MMP	CNS	IOW	AAS		33rd	277	
2010	Performance P–1 Motorsports	77	Toyota	AAS	**PHO**; 27	IOW	DCS	SON	IRW	PIR	MRP	CNS	MMP	AAS	PHO			74th	87	
2011	Performance P–1 Motorsports	77	Ford	PHO; 17	AAS	MMP	IOW	LVS	SON									50th	250	
2011	Curb Racing	98	Ford							IRW; 9	EVG	PIR	CNS	MRP	SPO	AAS	PHO	50th	250	

=== ARCA Re/Max Series ===
(key) (Bold – Pole position awarded by qualifying time. Italics – Pole position earned by points standings or practice time. * – Most laps led.)

ARCA Re/Max Series results
Year	Team	No.	Make	1	2	3	4	5	6	7	8	9	10	11	12	13	14	15	16	17	18	19	20	21	22	23	ARMC	Pts	Ref
2006	Bobby Gerhart Racing	7	Chevy	DAY; 39	NSH; 19	SLM	WIN	KEN; 25	TOL	POC	MCH	KAN	KEN	BLN	POC	GTW	NSH	MCH	ISF	MIL	TOL	DSF	CHI	SLM	TAL	IOW	92nd	280	
