= Tavo Hellmund =

American businessman (born 1966)

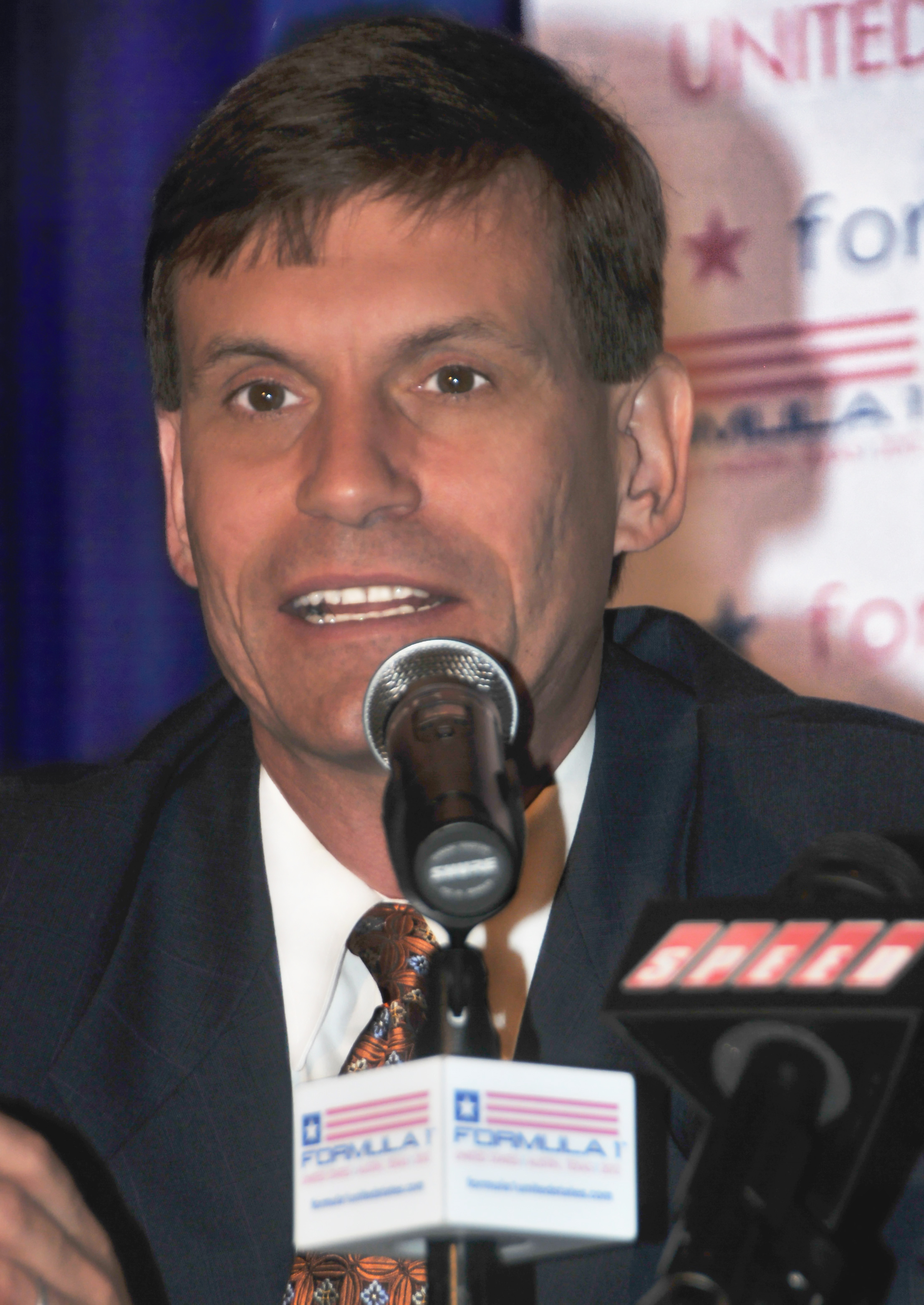
- Hellmund in 2010.
- Born: February 24, 1966 (age 60); Mexico City, Mexico
- Education: University of Texas; St. Edward’s University
- Occupations: Businessman, promoter

Tavo "C. T." Hellmund (born February 24, 1966) is an American businessman, event promoter and former racing driver. Although he worked for the 1986 FIFA World Cup in Mexico, Hellmund is better known for his work in Formula One racing, where he was responsible for both the return of the United States Grand Prix (2012, Austin) and the Mexican Grand Prix (2015), in addition to being a founding partner of Circuit of the Americas. As such, he has been described in journalism as the mastermind of the United States Grand Prix, and North America's F1 Hero.

== Racing career ==
Hellmund competed in the British Formula 3 International Series, Formula Vauxhall, SCCA races, Formula Ford races, kart racing, the ARCA Re/Max Series, late model races, and IMCA Modified races, earning numerous wins. Notably, he achieved victory in his NASCAR Winston West Series debut at Laguna Seca in 2001. He ultimately ended his driving career in 2005 due to budget constraints.

== Promoter ==
Hellmund has worked in several capacities on dozens of events, including a variety of races such as INDYCAR, IMSA and SCCA. Outside of motorsport his work includes the 1986 FIFA World Cup. From 2005 to 2009, he promoted the Texas Racefest at Thunder Hill Raceway in Kyle, Texas, which combined a USAC National Midget race and a NASCAR West Series race in the same event. Racefest was a sellout and won his company (Full Throttle Productions) Short Track Promoter of the Year in 2006.

=== United States Grand Prix ===
Hellmund has had a lifelong relationship with Bernie Ecclestone. In May 2010, Formula One announced that a ten-year deal was made with Hellmund's Full Throttle Productions for the United States Grand Prix to be hosted at Circuit of the Americas outside of Austin, Texas beginning in 2012.

Hellmund named the track Circuit of the Americas after a horse track in Mexico City owned by his business partners. He originally sketched the layout of the track on a barbecue napkin back in 2007. After a dispute with one of the COTA investors, Hellmund agreed to being bought out in 2014.

=== Mexican Grand Prix ===
In July 2014, Ecclestone confirmed the Mexican Grand Prix would return to the F1 schedule in the 2015 season. Hellmund worked with Alejandro Soberon, chief executive of Grupo CIE, to launch the event. After the first event, John Maher of the Austin American Statesman recounted that, on Sunday November 1, 2015 the Mexican Grand Prix had a race-day attendance of 134,850, and the three-day mark was 335,850. Three-time world champion and former Mercedes chairman Niki Lauda told reporters after the Mexican Grand Prix, "It was the best I've ever seen in my whole life." David Tremayne of The Straits Times wrote, "Now, that's a serious audience. As an object lesson in how to organize a grand prix, Hellmund's team set a new benchmark, and for this, the sport should be grateful". In December 2019 the Mexican Grand Prix was awarded the Formula One Race Promoters' Trophy for a record fifth year in a row.

== SXSW Sydney ==
In June 2022, it was revealed that Hellmund was one of the chief architects behind the SXSW Sydney event and on June 30th, The Australian New South Wales government, Destination NSW and TEG announced the launch of the multi-year SXSW Sydney Festival beginning in October 2023. Geoff Jones, CEO of TEG, event producer for SXSW Sydney thanked Hellmund for his 'vital support and vision.

== Manor F1 Team ==
In November 2015, it was reported that Hellmund was considering buying the Manor F1 Team, which was struggling financially, from Stephen Fitzpatrick. Hellmund stated that towards the end of 2016, a consortium led by him had agreed to the purchase on the condition that the team finished the season in tenth place in the Constructors' Championship. This would have guaranteed the team $15 million the following year in prize money. However, Manor lost the position at the Brazilian Grand Prix and the deal fell apart. Manor fell into administration and was out of business two months later.

== SportsTek SPAC ==
On February 17, 2021, Hellmund, along with former Houston Astros general manager Jeff Luhnow and San Antonio Spurs CEO R. C. Buford, announced the pricing of the initial public offering for their special-purpose acquisition company SportsTek listed on the Nasdaq Exchange.

== Motorsports career results ==
=== NASCAR ===
(key) (Bold – Pole position awarded by qualifying time. Italics – Pole position earned by points standings or practice time. * – Most laps led.)

==== NASCAR AutoZone West Series ====
NASCAR AutoZone West Series Results results
Year	Team	No.	Make	1	2	3	4	5	6	7	8	9	10	11	12	13	14	Pos.	Pts	Ref
2001	Hellmund Racing	39	Pontiac	PHO	LVS	TUS	MMR	CAL	IRW	LAG; 1*	KAN	EVG	CNS	IRW	RMR	LVS	IRW	43rd	185	
2002	Sammy Potashnick	65	Pontiac	PHO	LVS; 3	CAL	KAN	EVG	IRW	S99	RMR	DCS	LVS					37th	165	
2003	Hellmund Racing	39	Pontiac	PHO; 7	LVS; 2	CAL						RMR; 2	DCS	PHO	MMR			20th	621	
2003	Bill McAnally Racing	16	Chevy				MAD; 11	TCR	EVG	IRW	S99							20th	621	
2004	Adair Motorsports	3	Pontiac	PHO; 12														20th	676	
2004	Hellmund Racing	39	Pontiac		MMR	CAL	S99; 4	EVG	IRW; 13	S99	RMR; 21	DCS	PHO	CNS; 3	MMR	IRW		20th	676	
2005	Hellmund Racing	39	Chevy	PHO	MMR	PHO	S99	IRW	EVG	S99	PPR	CAL	DCS	CTS; 18	MMR			54th	109	
2006	Hellmund Racing	39	Pontiac	PHO	PHO	S99	IRW	SON; 32	DCS	IRW	EVG	S99	CAL	CTS; 21	AMP			45th	167	

==== NASCAR Busch North Series ====
NASCAR Busch North Series results
Year	Team	No.	Make	1	2	3	4	5	6	7	8	9	10	11	12	13	14	15	16	17	18	19	20	Pos.	Pts	Ref
2001	Hellmund Racing	64	Chevy	LEE	NHA	SEE	HOL	BEE	EPP	STA	WFD	BEE	TMP	NHA	STA	SEE	GLN; 37	NZH	THU	BEE	DOV	STA	LRP	83rd	52	

=== ARCA Re/Max Series ===
(key) (Bold – Pole position awarded by qualifying time. Italics – Pole position earned by points standings or practice time. * – Most laps led.)

ARCA Re/Max Series results
Year	Team	No.	Make	1	2	3	4	5	6	7	8	9	10	11	12	13	14	15	16	17	18	19	20	21	22	23	24	25	ARSC	Pts	Ref
2001	Hellmund Racing	09	Pontiac	DAY	NSH	WIN	SLM	GTY	KEN	CLT	KAN	MCH	POC	MEM	GLN; 24	KEN	MCH	POC	NSH	ISF	CHI	DSF	SLM	TOL	BLN	CLT	TAL	ATL	154th	110	
