= Eric Holmes (racing driver) =

American racing driver (born 1974)

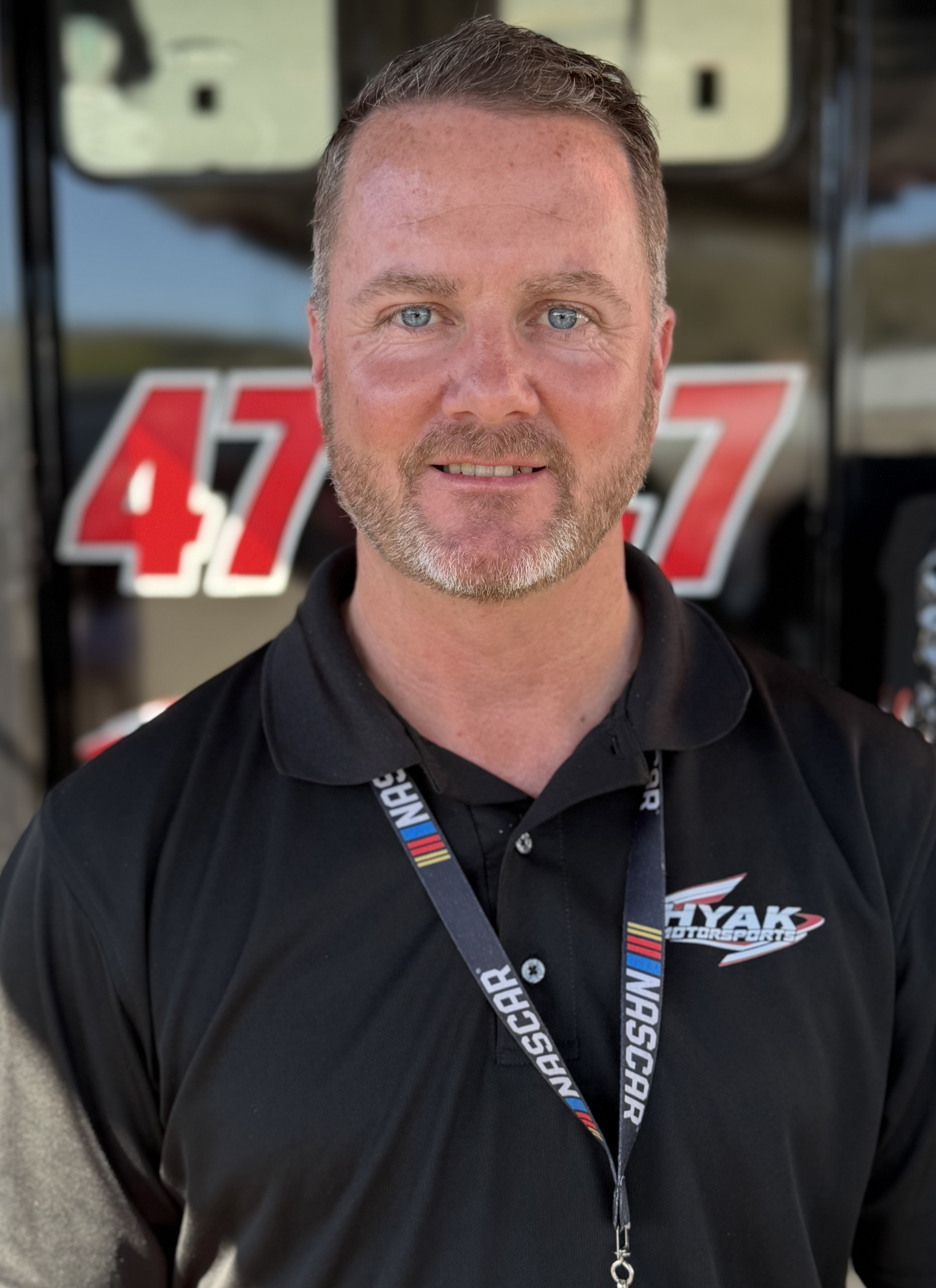
- Holmes at Phoenix Raceway in 2025
- Born: October 16, 1974 (age 52) Escalon, California, U.S.

NASCAR K&N Pro Series West
- Years active: 1997, 1999, 2000, 2002–2003, 2006–2013
- Teams: Bill McAnally Racing
- Starts: 102
- Wins: 17
- Poles: 13
- Best finish: 1st in 2006, 2008, 2010

Previous series
- 2007, 2013 1994–2006: NASCAR K&N Pro Series East; NASCAR Southwest Tour

Championship titles
- 2006, 2008, 2010: NASCAR K&N Pro Series West
- Statistics up to date as of October 19, 2020.

Eric Holmes (born October 16, 1974) is an American former professional stock car racing driver and three-time K&N Pro Series West champion.

== Racing career ==
After running in local sanctioned NASCAR tracks with his father and finishing second in the NASCAR Southwest Tour, Holmes made his K&N Pro Series debut in 1997. In 2006, Holmes' first full year, he won his first career race at Thunderhill Raceway Park and had four poles and nine top fives en route to his first championship.

In 2007, Holmes won the event at Altamont Raceway Park. In 2008, he won at All-American Speedway, Colorado National Speedway, Thunderhill Raceway Park and Douglas County Speedway, winning his second championship along with five poles and nine top fives. During the 2009 season, he won at All-American Speedway, Madera Speedway and Douglas County Speedway and finishing in second in points.

For 2010, Holmes got a record high five wins and clinched his third championship with victories at Phoenix International Raceway, his third straight at Douglas County Speedway, Montana Raceway Park, Colorado National Speedway, and his third win at All-American Speedway. Holmes was selected for the West Coast Stock Car/Motorsports Hall of Fame’s class of 2024.

== Motorsports career results ==
=== NASCAR ===
(key) (Bold – Pole position awarded by qualifying time. Italics – Pole position earned by points standings or practice time. * – Most laps led. ** – All laps led.)

==== K&N Pro Series East ====
NASCAR K&N Pro Series East results
Year	Team	No.	Make	1	2	3	4	5	6	7	8	9	10	11	12	13	14	NKNPSEC	Pts	Ref
2007	NDS Motorsports	35	Chevy	GRE; 15	ELK; 10	IOW; 19	SBO; 8	STA; 19	NHA; 38	TMP; 9	NSH	ADI	LRP	MFD	NHA	DOV		25th	798	
2013	Bill McAnally Racing	16	Toyota	BRI	GRE	FIF	RCH	BGS	IOW	LGY	COL; 22	IOW	VIR	GRE	NHA	DOV	RAL	68th	22	

==== K&N Pro Series West ====
NASCAR K&N Pro Series West results
Year	Team	No.	Make	1	2	3	4	5	6	7	8	9	10	11	12	13	14	15	NKNPSWC	Pts	Ref
1997	Beebe Racing Enterprises	63	Chevy	TUS	AMP	SON	TUS	MMR	LVS	CAL	EVG	POR	PPR	AMP	SON	MMR; 5	LVS		55th	160	
1999	Beebe Racing Enterprises	63	Chevy	TUS	LVS	PHO	CAL	PPR	MMR	IRW	EVG	POR	IRW	RMR	LVS	MMR; 9	MOT		61st	138	
2000	Beebe Racing Enterprises	63	Chevy	PHO; 24	MMR	LVS	CAL	LAG	IRW	POR	EVG	IRW	RMR	MMR; 25	IRW				33rd	288	
2002	Orleans Racing	62	Chevy	PHO	LVS	CAL	KAN	EVG	IRW	S99	RMR	DCS; 3	LVS						36th	165	
2003	Bill McAnally Racing	12	Chevy	PHO	LVS	CAL	MAD; 5	TCR	EVG	IRW	S99	RMR	DCS	PHO	MMR				39th	155	
2006	Beebe Racing Enterprises	62	Chevy	PHO; 2	PHO; 4	S99; 20	**IRW**; 2		DCS; 3	IRW; 2	**EVG**; 9*	**S99**; 2*	CAL; 3	CTS; 1	**AMP**; 5*				1st	1889	
2006	NDS Motorsports	35	Ford					SON; 25											1st	1889	
2007	Beebe Racing Enterprises	62	Chevy	CTS	PHO; 34	AMP	ELK	IOW	CNS			**IRW**; 1	MMP	EVG	CSR	AMP; 1*			22nd	586	
2007	Beebe Racing Enterprises	62	Dodge							SON; 4	DCS								22nd	586	
2008	Bill McAnally Racing	20	Toyota	AAS; 1**	PHO; 23*	**CTS**; 1	IOW; 12	**CNS**; 1*	**SON**; 2	IRW; 2	**DCS**; 1*	**EVG**; 2	MMP; 16	IRW; 8	AMP; 4*	AAS; 5*			1st	2098	
2009	Bill McAnally Racing	20	Toyota	CTS; 3	AAS; 1*	PHO; 2	MAD; 1	IOW; 16	**DCS**; 1**	SON; 3	IRW; 6	PIR; 7	MMP; 8	**CNS**; 9*	IOW; 10	**AAS**; 16			2nd	2035	
2010	Bill McAnally Racing	20	Toyota	AAS; 20	PHO; 1	IOW; 3	DCS; 1*	SON; 4	IRW; 10	PIR; 2	MRP; 1	CNS; 1*	MMP; 6	**AAS**; 1*	PHO; 15				1st	1945	
2011	Bill McAnally Racing	20	Toyota	PHO; 14	AAS; 6	MMP; 13*	IOW; 6	LVS; 22	SON; 3	IRW; 4	EVG; 4	PIR; 2	CNS; 5	MRP; 3	**SPO**; 1	**AAS**; 1	PHO; 4		2nd	2062	
2012	Bill McAnally Racing	20	Toyota	PHO; 8	LHC; 5	MMP; 2	S99; 2	IOW; 9	BIR; 3	LVS; 19	SON; 23	EVG; 1*	CNS; 7	IOW; 3	PIR; 3	SMP; 3	AAS; 2*	PHO; 20	4th	557	
2013	Bill McAnally Racing	20	Toyota	PHO	S99; 5	BIR													11th	418	
2013	Bill McAnally Racing	16	Toyota				IOW; 14	L44; 6	SON; 9	CNS; 8	IOW; 12	EVG; 12	SPO; 18	MMP; 19	SMP; 4	AAS; 3	KCR; 3	PHO	11th	418	

Sporting positions
Preceded by Mike Duncan	NASCAR AutoZone West Series Champion; 2006	Succeeded by Mike David
Preceded by Mike David	NASCAR Camping World West Series Champion; 2008	Succeeded by Jason Bowles
Preceded by Jason Bowles	NASCAR K&N Pro Series West Champion; 2010	Succeeded by Greg Pursley
