= 2006 NASCAR AutoZone West Series =

53rd season of the NASCAR AutoZone West Series

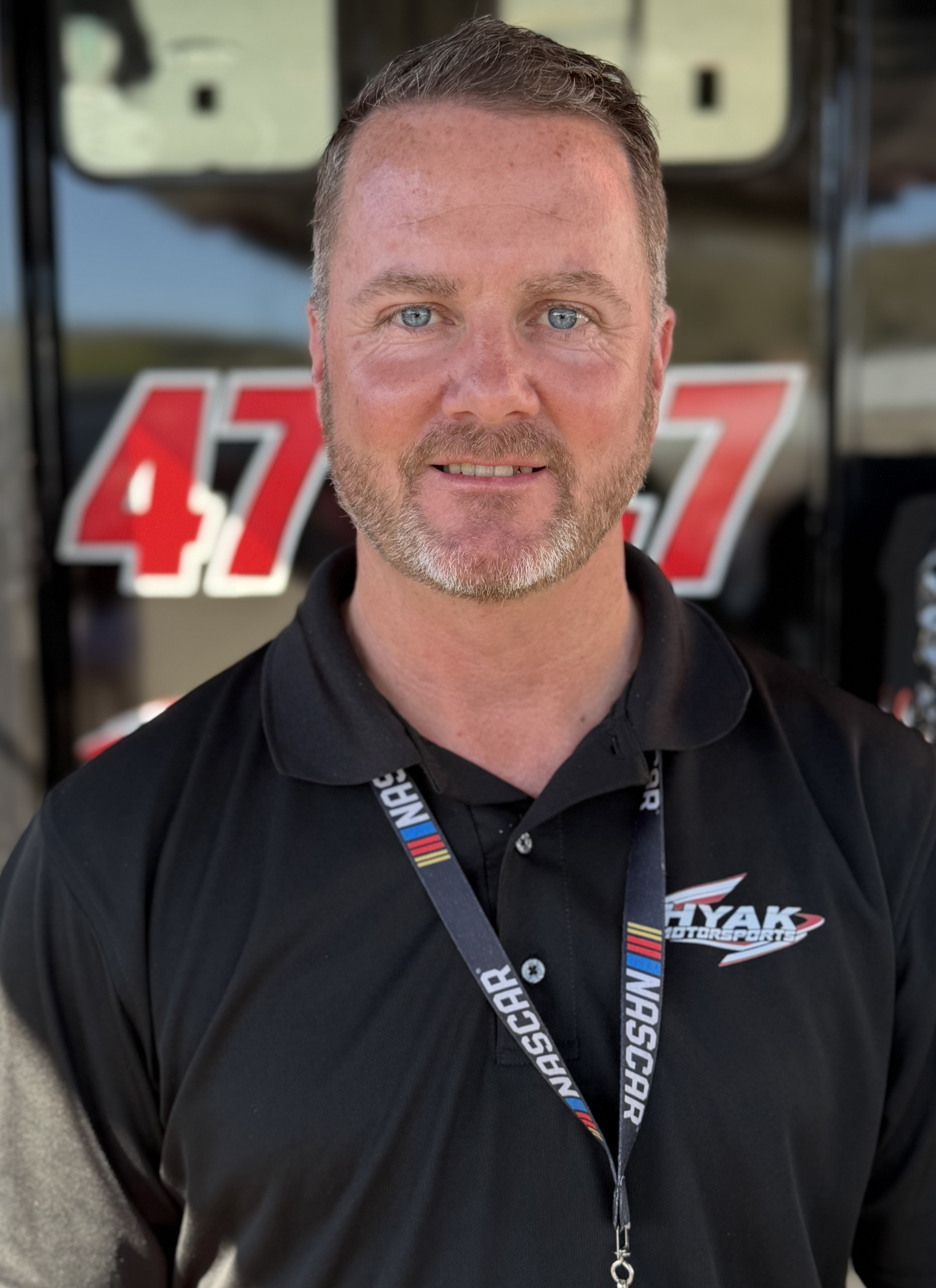
Eric Holmes, the 2006 West Series champion.

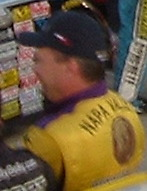
Mike David finished second in the standings.

The 2006 NASCAR AutoZone West Series was the 53rd season of the series and the only season with title sponsor AutoZone. The title was won by Eric Holmes, his first in the series.

== Schedule and results ==
The 2006 season included 12 individual races, although Phoenix International Raceway, Stockton 99 Speedway, and Irwindale Speedway hosted 2 races each.

Date	Name	Racetrack	Location	Winner
January 22	United Rentals 125	Phoenix International Raceway	Avondale, Arizona	Ken Schrader
April 20	Casino Arizona 150	Phoenix International Raceway	Avondale, Arizona	Andrew Myers
April 29	Basalite 150 by Havoline	Stockton 99 Speedway	Stockton, California	Mike David
May 27	King Taco 200	Irwindale Speedway	Irwindale, California	Andrew Myers
June 24	Blue Lizard Australian Suncream 200	Infineon Raceway	Sonoma, California	Brian Vickers
July 1	Bi-Mart 150 by NAPA Belts & Hose	Douglas County Speedway	Roseburg, Oregon	Peyton Sellers
July 22	King Taco 200	Irwindale Speedway	Irwindale, California	Austin Cameron
July 29	NAPA 250 Presented by AAA	Evergreen Speedway	Monroe, Washington	Johnny Borneman III
August 5	Dodge Country 200	Stockton 99 Speedway	Stockton, California	Mike David
September 1	Relocate Here 200 by San Bernardino County	California Speedway	Fontana, California	Mike Duncan
September 30	Allstate Texas Thunder 200	Thunder Hill Raceway	Kyle, Texas	Eric Holmes
October 15	Altamont 200	Altamont Motorsports Park	Tracy, California	Austin Cameron

== Full Drivers' Championship ==
(key) Bold – Pole position awarded by time. Italics – Pole position set by owner's points. * – Most laps led.

Pos	Driver	PHO	PHO	S99	IRW	SON	DCS	IRW	EVG	S99	CAL	CTS	AMP	Pts
1	Eric Holmes	2	4	20	**2**	25	3	2	**9***	**2***	3	1	**5***	1889
2	Mike David	14	3	1*	6	29	2	5	8	1	9	**5***	13	1806
3	Mike Duncan	13	**7**	11	5	11	6	15	2	7	1	8	7	1762
4	Steve Portenga	7	5	3	7	33	8	4	3	8	6	6	11	1720
5	Peyton Sellers	5	2	15	23	3	**1***	**16**	5	3	21	16	20	1675
6	Jim Inglebright	8	8	5	15	23	5	6	11	13	2	12	6	1657
7	Scott Gaylord	10	32	6	3	15	10	9	6	5	8	14	2	1644
8	Austin Cameron	28	6	18	25	14	16	1	7	4	15	3	1	1631
9	Brian Ickler	6	16	19	8	2	13	27	17	12	7	2	8	1591
10	Johnny Borneman III	11	33	2	11	28	15	3	1	18	23	4	3	1569
11	Justin Lofton	12	22	13	14	4	9	7	10	9	24	13	21	1500
12	Tim Woods		15	8	4	35	4	17*	13	6	31	7	4	1425
13	Eric Hardin	24	27	9	20	20	11	22	14	10	13	10	19	1363
14	Andrew Myers	21	1		1*	10	18	25	18	20	18	18	18	1350
15	Jack Sellers	19	17	17	16	19	12	20	16	15	28	15	16	1326
16	Brett Thompson	9	18	4	10	27	7	11			5	22	10	1295
17	Bobby Hillis Jr.	33	28	22	18	34	14	14	15	16	33	19	22	1152
18	Daryl Harr	15	11	14		18					16			593
19	Stan Silva Jr.		DNQ		13	8		26			19			484
20	Nick Lynch	22	25	**12**							4			472
21	Daniel DiGiacomo	20	DNQ		9			18			27			460
22	Takuma Koga			21	17	31				19	32			455
23	Ken Schrader	1	10			16								434
24	Carl Harr	25	19	7		24								431
25	Spencer Clark	**4***	9	16										423
26	Todd Souza		DNQ			6		12			17			414
27	James Bruncati	23	20	DNQ	22	30								403
28	Moses Smith							10		14			17	367
29	Brian Pannone	26	14	DNQ	19									339
30	Matt Kobyluck	3	30*								25			336
31	Charles Price	18						28			10			322
32	Rick Ruzbarsky						17	19					DNQ	309
33	Andrew Phipps		34					24					9	290
34	Bruce Betts	30	23									17		279
35	Robbie Brand		31					21			20			273
36	Giuliano Losacco								12			9		265
37	Eric Humphries	16		10										249
38	Brandon Loverock							13			14			245
39	Thomas Martin					12							23	221
40	David Cardey	27									12			209
41	Travis Powell	DNQ							19					195
42	Brian Vickers					**1***								185
43	Justin Fisher	DNQ	13	DNQ										180
44	Auggie Vidovich		24								**29***			172
45	C. T. Hellmund					32						21		167
46	Jeff Barkshire	29									26			161
47	Jeff Jefferson								5					160
48	Ed Watson	31	26											155
49	Tom Hubert					5								155
50	Barry Bradshaw			DNQ	12									152
51	Tom Dyer					7								146
52	Garland Self					13								146
53	David Eshleman	32	29											143
54	Kevin Conway							8						142
55	Ken Epsman					9								138
56	John Moore									11				130
57	Mark Schulz											11		130
58	Chris Bristol										11			130
59	Darrell Midgley												12	127
60	Chris Cook		12											127
61	Chris Oddo		DNQ		24									122
62	Jim Courage Jr.												14	121
63	Wade Bland												15	118
64	Jeff Anton	17												112
65	Josh Bews									17				112
66	Kenny Shepherd					17								112
67	Ted Christopher		21											105
68	Randy Lynch											20		103
69	John Sahm								20					103
70	Rick Wall				21									100
71	Tim Smith					21								100
72	Boris Said					22								97
73	Rogelio López										22			97
74	Scott Youngren							23						94
75	P. J. Abbott					26								85
76	Jerick Johnson										30			73
77	Andrew Lewis	34												61
78	Chris Schmelzle	DNQ												25
79	Mike Mulhall	DNQ												22

== See also ==
- 2006 NASCAR Nextel Cup Series
- 2006 NASCAR Busch Series
- 2006 NASCAR Craftsman Truck Series
- 2006 NASCAR Whelen Modified Tour
- 2006 NASCAR Whelen Southern Modified Tour
- 2006 ARCA Re/Max Series
