= 2005 NASCAR West Series =

52nd season of the NASCAR West Series

The 2005 NASCAR West Series, also known as the Grand National Division, West Series and Grand National West Series, was the 52nd season of the series. The title was won by Mike Duncan, his second in the series and his second in succession.

== Schedule and results ==
The 2005 season included 12 individual races, although Phoenix International Raceway, Mesa Marin Raceway, and Stockton 99 Speedway hosted two races each.

Date	Name	Racetrack	Location	Winner
January 30	United Rentals 100	Phoenix International Raceway	Avondale, Arizona	David Gilliland
April 9	Lucas Oil 150	Mesa Marin Raceway	Bakersfield, California	Scott Lynch
April 21	Casino Arizona 150	Phoenix International Raceway	Avondale, Arizona	Burney Lamar
April 30	Autozone Twin Championships by Havoline	Stockton 99 Speedway	Stockton, California	Scott Lynch
July 23	King Taco 150	Irwindale Speedway	Irwindale, California	Steve Portenga
July 30	Coors Light 200 by NAPA & Creekside-Mountain	Evergreen Speedway	Monroe, Washington	Mike Duncan
August 13	4th Annual Dodge Country / NAPA 200	Stockton 99 Speedway	Stockton, California	Mike Duncan
August 21	NAPA 150 Presented by NAPA Belts and Hose	Pikes Peak International Raceway	Fountain, Colorado	Steve Portenga
September 2	Relocate Here 200 by San Bernardino County	California Speedway	Fontana, California	Burney Lamar
September 17	NAPA 200 Presented by NAPA Belts and Hose	Douglas County Speedway	Roseburg, Oregon	Mike Duncan
October 1	Allstate Texas Thunder 200	Thunder Hill Raceway	Kyle, Texas	Steve Portenga
October 15	Ford Motorcraft Parts 150 by 3M	Mesa Marin Raceway	Bakersfield, California	Mike David

== Full Drivers' Championship ==
(key) Bold – Pole position awarded by time. Italics – Pole position set by owner's points. * – Most laps led.

Pos	Driver	PHO	MMR	PHO	S99	IRW	EVG	S99	PPR	CAL	DCS	CTS	MMR	Pts
1	Mike Duncan	2	**5**	**19**	2	**4**	**1***	1	4	3	**1***	16	**2***	1951
2	Steve Portenga	9	3	4	6	1*	18	4*	1	7	3	1*	6	1908
3	Scott Lynch	10	1	2	**1***	2	3	**2**	2	4	2	15	17	1899
4	David Gilliland	**1**	2	29	5	5	2	3	8	**16***	4	2	4	1858
5	Mike David	4	4	16	3	16	6	10	7	8	11	5	1	1757
6	Brett Thompson	23	7	12	7	3	16	8	5	9	8	7	13	1645
7	Scott Gaylord	22	20	14	4	6	7	11	15	14	6	**3**	5	1626
8	Tim Woods	11	17	7	9	20	4	15	6	13	5	12	9	1601
9	Andrew Myers	17	14	9	18	7	13	9	**14**	21	7	4	3	1590
10	Andrew Lewis	16	9	17	8	18	5	6	12	18	13	8	15	1541
11	Daryl Harr	12	15	24	13	9	9	5	18	6	10	9	19	1528
12	Sarah Fisher	20	16	28	12	8	11	17	9	22	12	6	7	1471
13	Jack Sellers	25	11	18	16	29	15	12	17	25	17	17	24	1278
14	Takuma Koga	30	21	27	Wth	26	17	14	16	20	16	11	26	1227
15	Tim Smith	18			10	23	14	18	10	23	9	10	21	1167
16	Rick Ruzbarsky	27	8	10	15			19					8	724
17	Johnny Borneman III	15		21		17			3	2				670
18	Burney Lamar		6*	1*						1			10	664
19	Jason Jefferson	3	13			25	12	13						628
20	Spencer Clark	14		5		28			19*	5				621
21	Chris Schmelzle	26				13	8			15	14			590
22	David Cardey	29	10	26						11			25	513
23	José Luis Ramírez	28	12	8	11									478
24	Ed Watson	19		11			10						22	467
25	Bobby Hillis Jr.	33		30		27			20	19				428
26	Carl Harr	24	19	22	17									406
27	David Eshleman	32	18	15		22				24				385
28	Robbie Brand					12			13	17				363
29	Jason Small			13		21							12	351
30	Dale Quarterley	8		6										297
31	Eric Humphries							7					11	276
32	P. J. Abbott					15						14		239
33	Jeff Davis					11		20						233
34	Nick Joanides											13	23	218
35	Eric Hardin					19							18	215
36	Daniel DiGiacomo					10							DNQ	195
37	Charles Price		22	25									20	185
38	Ryan Moore			3										170
39	Rick Craig			20									DNQ	170
40	Brandon Ash	5												155
41	Gene Woods	DNQ	23											155
42	Michel Jourdain Jr.	6												150
43	Matt Kobyluck	7												146
44	Jorge Goeters									10				134
45	Kevin Harvick	13*												134
46	Clint Vahsholtz								11					130
47	Rocky Moran Jr.									12				127
48	Nick DeFazio												14	121
49	Chris Oddo					14								121
50	John Moore				14									121
51	Michelle Theriault										15			118
52	Melissa Davis							16						115
53	Justin Lofton												16	115
54	Jeff Barkshire										18			109
55	C. T. Hellmund											18		109
56	Travis Powell						19							106
57	Nick Lynch											19		106
58	Randy Lynch											20		103
59	Brandon Miller	21												100
60	Ted Christopher			23										94
61	Ron Peterson					24								91
62	Jim Inglebright												27	82
63	Mike Mulhall												28	79
64	Kristi Schmitt												DNQ	76
65	Clay Andrews												DNQ	73
66	Brad Pollard												DNQ	70
67	Ken Schrader	31												70
68	Brian Pannone												DNQ	64
69	Troy Shirk												DNQ	61
70	Bruce Betts												DNQ	55

== See also ==
- 2005 NASCAR Nextel Cup Series
- 2005 NASCAR Busch Series
- 2005 NASCAR Craftsman Truck Series
- 2005 NASCAR Whelen Modified Tour
- 2005 NASCAR Whelen Southern Modified Tour
- 2005 ARCA Re/Max Series
