= 2002 NASCAR Winston West Series =

49th season of the NASCAR Winston West Series

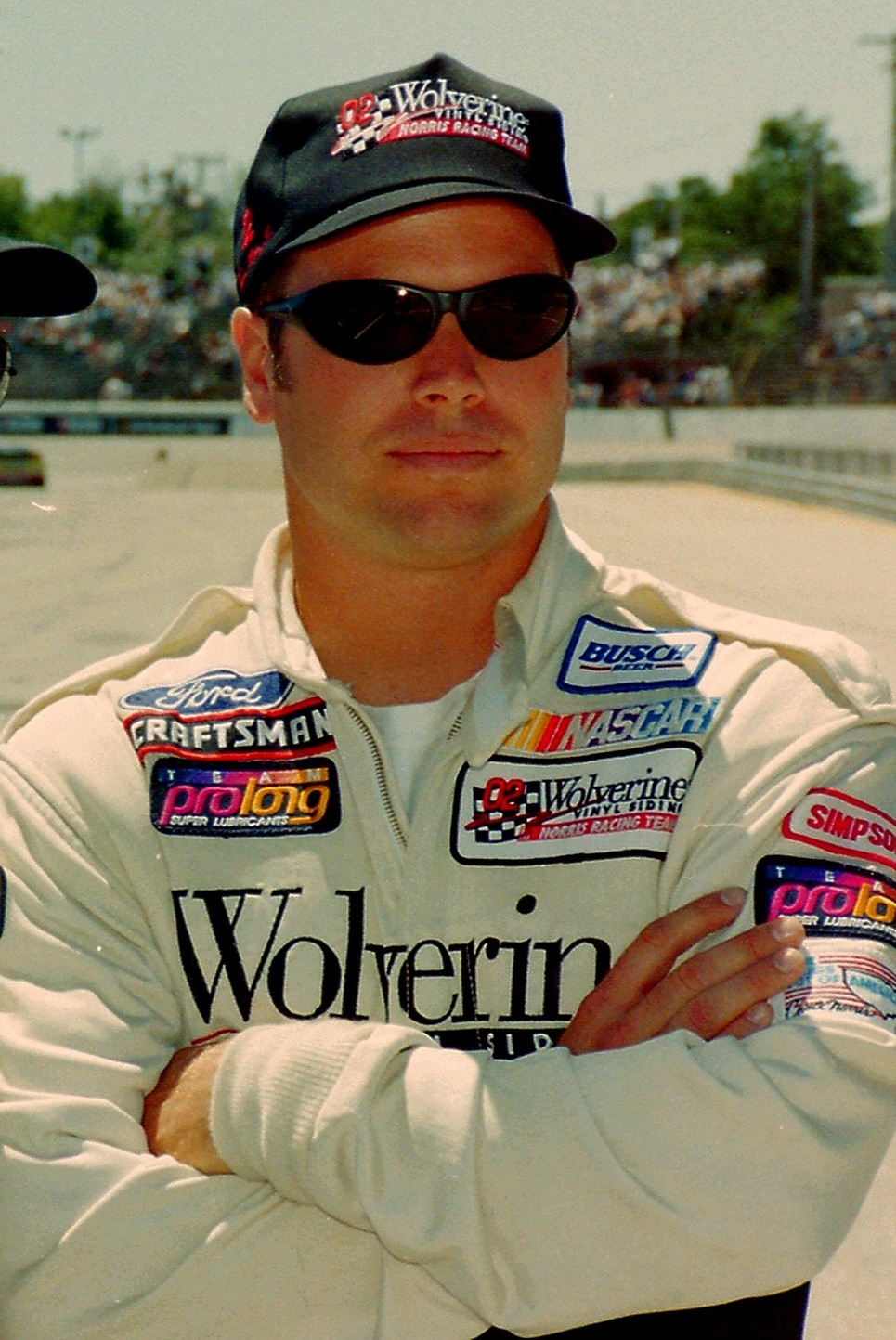
Eric Norris, the 2002 West Series champion.

The 2002 NASCAR Winston West Series was the 49th season of the series. The title was won by Eric Norris, his first in the series.

== Schedule and results ==
The 2002 season included 10 individual races, each at a different track.

Date	Name	Racetrack	Location	Winner
February 2	Winter Heat Presented by Bosch	Phoenix International Raceway	Avondale, Arizona	Austin Cameron
April 13	Orleans 222	The Bullring at Las Vegas Motor Speedway	Las Vegas, Nevada	Austin Cameron
April 27	Pontiac Widetrack Grand Prix 200	California Speedway	Fontana, California	Eric Norris
June 1	KansasSpeedway.com 150	Kansas Speedway	Kansas City, Kansas	Brandon Ash
June 29	Coors Light 200 Pres. by NAPA & Albertson's	Evergreen Speedway	Monroe, Washington	Eric Norris
July 27	Jani-King 200	Irwindale Speedway	Irwindale, California	Austin Cameron
August 17	NAPA 200 by Stockton Speedway Dodge Country	Stockton 99 Speedway	Stockton, California	Johnny Borneman III
August 31	Young Automotive Group 250	Rocky Mountain Raceways	West Valley City, Utah	Austin Cameron
September 21	NAPA Auto Parts 200	Douglas County Speedway	Roseburg, Oregon	Austin Cameron
October 12	The Orleans 150	Las Vegas Motor Speedway	Las Vegas, Nevada	Scott Lynch

== Full Drivers' Championship ==
(key) Bold – Pole position awarded by time. Italics – Pole position set by owner's points. * – Most laps led.

Pos	Driver	PHO	LVS	CAL	KAN	EVG	IRW	S99	RMR	DCS	LVS	Pts
1	Eric Norris	**3**	10	**1***	3	1	2	4	7	2	2	1665
2	Kevin Richards	6	7	2	9	8	3*	5	2	7	10	1546
3	Austin Cameron	1*	**1**	3	**17**	**11***	**1***	12	1	1	25	1542
4	Johnny Borneman III	8	23	10	10	2	5	1*	8	8	7	1459
5	Mike Duncan	13	14	4	2	3	11	2	17	4	8	1459
6	Brandon Ash	18	9	16	1*	7	8	**9**	10	5	5	1417
7	Mike David	11	4	20	5	5	7	3	6	13	26	1383
8	Scott Gaylord	24	5	9	15	6	6	11	**3***	**17***	9	1382
9	Greg Pursley	5	6*	12	11	15	4	7	21	9	11	1364
10	Brett Thompson	14	20	6	6	10	9	8	12	18	3	1339
11	Bobby Hillis Jr.	17	12	17	12	13	18	16	19	16	21	1147
12	Jack Sellers	21	13	13	7	18	20	13	20	12	27	1142
13	Gene Woods	DNQ	DNQ				19	6	16	14	14	783
14	Scott Lynch	12		8	8				4		1	756
15	Tim Woods	10	24	7	14	12	15				DNQ	742
16	Carl Harr	16	18		13				11		17	590
17	Daryl Harr	19	11		20				9		19	583
18	Jeff Jefferson	20	8	21	18	16						569
19	Jeff Davis			19		17	13			15	20	563
20	Clint Vahsholtz		15				21		18		13	545
21	David Gilliland			5	16		12				18	506
22	Dusty Fielden		22				14		13	11		472
23	Mike Grady	23	16		19						12	442
24	Mark Reed								5	10	15	407
25	Rick Bogart		17	18							6	371
26	Sean Woodside	4	2									345
27	Hershel McGriff	7	21	22								343
28	G. J. Mennen Jr.	15	19	15								342
29	Scott Schmidt								15	20	22	318
30	Sammy Potashnick	2				DNQ						276
31	Eddy McKean									6	24	246
32	Dan Obrist					9				22		240
33	Takuma Koga					14	16					236
34	Kevin Culver							10		21		234
35	Blake Mallory									19	16	221
36	Eric Holmes									3		165
37	C. T. Hellmund		3									165
38	Jason Small										4	165
39	Ed Watson					4						160
40	John Metcalf				4							160
41	Ken Schrader	9										138
42	Todd Burns						10					134
43	Butch Gilliland			11								130
44	Marty Zehr								14			121
45	Buzz DeVore							14				121
46	Mike Hamby			14								121
47	Kenny Shepherd							15				118
48	Keith Van Houten							17				112
49	Travis Wieden						17					112
50	John Krebs							18				109
51	Brendan Gaughan										**23***	104
52	John O'Neal Jr.				21							100
53	Frank Kimmel				22							97
54	Jeff Barrister	22										97
55	John Baker	DNQ										88
56	Michael Walker	DNQ										85
	Ralph Hubbert					DNQ						

== See also ==
- 2002 NASCAR Winston Cup Series
- 2002 NASCAR Busch Series
- 2002 NASCAR Craftsman Truck Series
- 2002 NASCAR Goody's Dash Series
- 2002 ARCA Re/Max Series
