= Mike Duncan (racing driver) =

American racing driver (born 1962)

- Born: January 22, 1962 (age 64); Bakersfield, California, U.S.

ARCA Menards Series West career
- 95 races run over 9 years
- Best finish: 1st (2004, 2005)
- First race: 1999 Winston West 200 (Tucson)
- Last race: 2007 Toyota / NAPA Auto Parts 150 (Altamont)
- First win: 2003 NAPA 150 by NAPA Belts & Hose/Madera Auto Ctr (Madera)
- Last win: 2007 NAPA 150 (Erie)
Wins	Top tens	Poles
8	63	20
- Statistics up to date as of November 13, 2024.

Mike Duncan (born January 22, 1962) is an American former professional stock car racing driver who competed in the NASCAR West Series from 1999 to 2007. Duncan is a former champion of the series, having won the championship in 2004 and 2005.

Duncan has also competed in the ARCA Re/Max Series and the Shell Tri-Track Challenge.

== Motorsports results ==
=== NASCAR ===
(key) (Bold - Pole position awarded by qualifying time. Italics - Pole position earned by points standings or practice time. * – Most laps led.)

==== West Series ====
NASCAR West Series results
Year	Team	No.	Make	1	2	3	4	5	6	7	8	9	10	11	12	13	14	NWSC	Pts	Ref
1999	MB Duncan Motorsports	67	Ford	TUS; 25	LVS; 26	PHO; 23	CAL; 17	PPR	MMR	IRW	EVG	POR	IRW	RMR	LVS; 27	MMR	MOT	31st	466	
2000	MB Duncan Motorsports	9	Chevy	PHO; 25	MMR; 4	LVS; 12	CAL; 8	LAG; 20	IRW; 3	POR; 21	EVG; 7	IRW; 17	RMR; 4	MMR; 5	IRW; 7			8th	1604	
2001	MB Duncan Motorsports	9	Chevy	PHO; 12	LVS; 2	TUS; 19	MMR; 20	CAL; 29	IRW	LAG	KAN; 19	EVG	CNS	IRW	RMR	LVS	IRW; 14	18th	814	
2002	MB Duncan Motorsports	9	Chevy	PHO; 13	LVS; 14	CAL; 4	KAN; 2	EVG; 3	IRW; 11	S99; 2	RMR; 17	DCS; 4	LVS; 8					5th	1459	
2003	MB Duncan Motorsports	9	Chevy	PHO; 20	LVS; 6	CAL; 8	**MAD**; 1*	TCR; 7	EVG; 2	IRW; 6	S99; 6	RMR; 6	DCS; 2	PHO; 3	**MMR**; 1*			2nd	1876	
2004	MB Duncan Motorsports	9	Chevy	PHO; 10	**MMR**; 2*	CAL; 8	**S99**; 2*	EVG; 3	**IRW**; 4*	**S99**; 2	RMR; 4	**DCS**; 3*	**PHO**; 19	CNS; 1	**MMR**; 5*	IRW; 9		1st	2090	
2005	MB Duncan Motorsports	9	Chevy	PHO; 2	**MMR**; 5	**PHO**; 19	S99; 2	**IRW**; 4	**EVG**; 1*	S99; 1	PPR; 4	CAL; 3	**DCS**; 1*	CTS; 16	**MMR**; 2*			1st	1951	
2006	MB Duncan Motorsports	9	Chevy	PHO; 13	**PHO**; 7	S99; 11	IRW; 5	SON; 11	DCS; 6	IRW; 15	EVG; 2	S99; 7	CAL; 1	CTS; 8	AMP; 7			3rd	1762	
2007	MB Duncan Motorsports	9	Chevy	**CTS**; 3	**PHO**; 39	**AMP**; 9	ELK; 4	IOW; 3	CNS; 1	SON; 16	DCS; 14	IRW; 2	MMP; 14	**EVG**; 2	CSR; 5	AMP; 7		2nd	1899	

=== ARCA Re/Max Series ===
(key) (Bold – Pole position awarded by qualifying time. Italics – Pole position earned by points standings or practice time. * – Most laps led.)

ARCA Re/Max Series results
Year	Team	No.	Make	1	2	3	4	5	6	7	8	9	10	11	12	13	14	15	16	17	18	19	20	21	22	23	ARMC	Pts	Ref
2002	Mike Duncan	9	Chevy	DAY	ATL	NSH	SLM	KEN	CLT	KAN; 8	POC	MCH	TOL	SBO	KEN	BLN	POC	NSH	ISF	WIN	DSF	CHI	SLM	TAL	CLT		118th	190	
2007	Duncan Racing	91	Chevy	DAY	USA	NSH; 22	SLM	KAN	WIN	KEN	TOL	IOW	POC	MCH	BLN	KEN	POC	NSH	ISF	MIL	GTW	DSF	CHI	SLM	TAL	TOL	142nd	120	
