= 2007 NASCAR West Series =

54th season of the NASCAR West Series

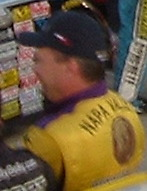
Mike David, the 2007 West Series champion.

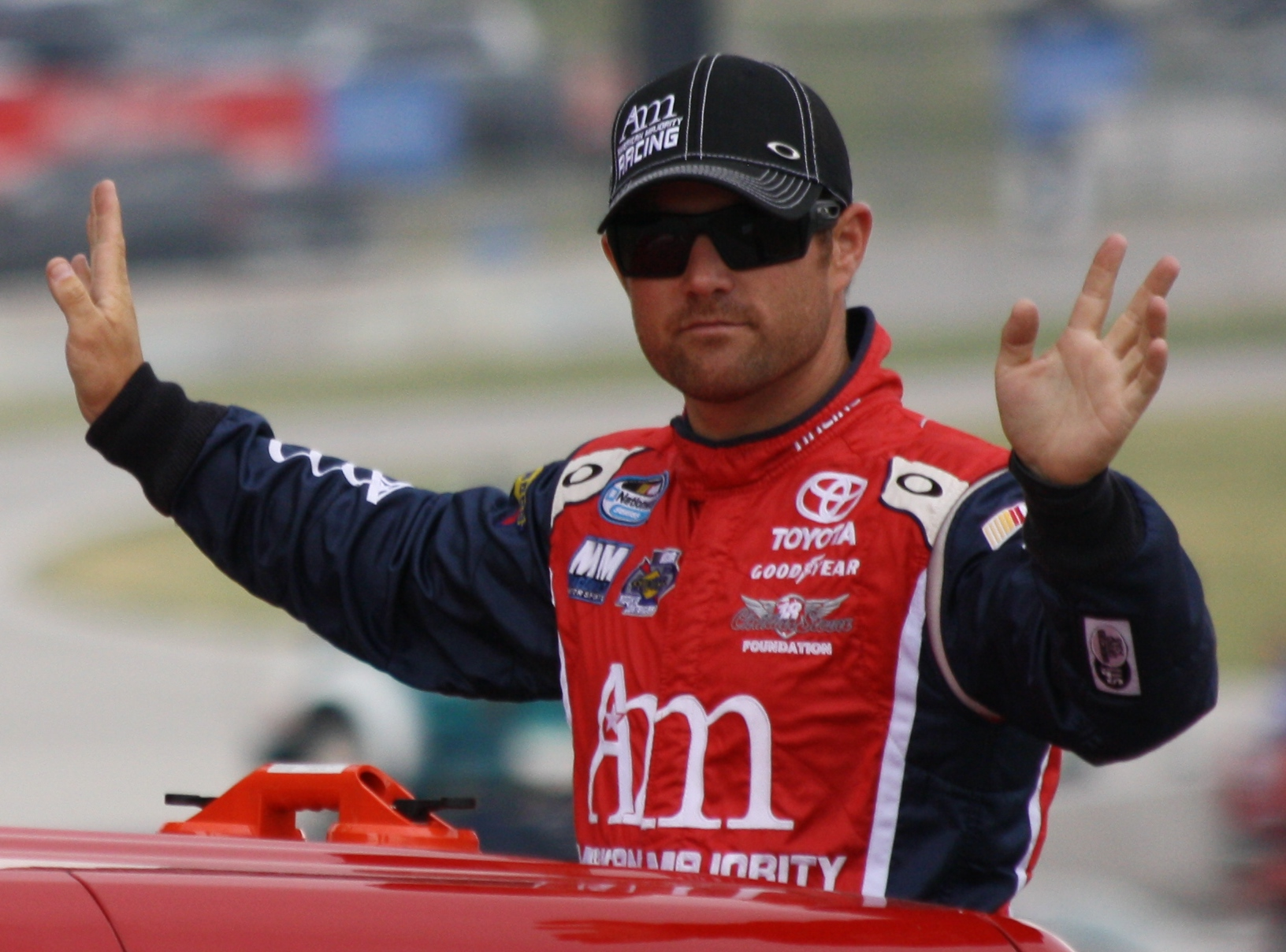
Jason Bowles finished third in the standings.

The 2007 NASCAR West Series was the 54th season of the series and the last without a title sponsor. The title was won by Mike David, his first in the series.

== Schedule and results ==
The 2007 season included 13 individual races, although Altamont Motorsports Park hosted two races. The races at Elko Speedway and Iowa Speedway were in combination with the NASCAR Camping World East Series.

Date	Name	Racetrack	Location	Winner
March 31	Allstate Texas Thunder 150	Thunder Hill Raceway	Kyle, Texas	Scott Lynch
April 19	Alphatrade.com 150	Phoenix International Raceway	Avondale, Arizona	Joey Logano
April 28	Altamont 200	Altamont Motorsports Park	Tracy, California	Mike David
May 18	Minnesota 150	Elko Speedway	Elko New Market, Minnesota	Sean Caisse
May 20	Featherlite Coaches 200	Iowa Speedway	Newton, Iowa	Joey Logano
June 2	NAPA 150	Colorado National Speedway	Erie, Colorado	Mike Duncan
June 23	Blue Lizard Suncream 200	Infineon Raceway	Sonoma, California	David Gilliland
June 30	Bi-Mart Firecracker 150	Douglas County Speedway	Roseburg, Oregon	Brian Ickler
July 4	King Taco 200	Irwindale Speedway	Irwindale, California	Brian Ickler
July 14	Big O Tires 150	Miller Motorsports Park	Tooele, Utah	Jason Bowles
August 4	NAPA 300	Evergreen Speedway	Monroe, Washington	Brian Ickler
August 11	California 125	California Speedway Road Course	Fontana, California	Jason Bowles
September 15	Dan Gamel RV Centers 200	Altamont Motorsports Park	Tracy, California	Eric Holmes

== Full Drivers' Championship ==
(key) Bold – Pole position awarded by time. Italics – Pole position set by owner's points. * – Most laps led.

Pos	Driver	CTS	PHO	AMP	ELK	IOW	CNS	SON	DCS	IRW	MMP	EVG	CSR	AMP	Pts
1	Mike David	2	3	1	1 (Note: Finished 3rd overall)	13 (Note: Finished 20th overall)	2	24	**15***	5	**3***	3	11	3	2013
2	Mike Duncan	**3**	**35**	**9**	4 (Note: Finished 15th overall)	3 (Note: Finished 5th overall)	1	16	14	2	14	**2**	5	7	1899
3	Jason Bowles	5	18	5	5 (Note: Finished 16th overall)	14 (Note: Finished 22nd overall)	5	29	3	11	1	16	**1***	5	1871
4	Brian Ickler	23	33	13	7 (Note: Finished 20th overall)	12 (Note: Finished 22nd overall)	**15***	6	1	1*	6	1*	2	**16**	1838
5	Johnny Borneman III	11	12	8*	8 (Note: Finished 23rd overall)	2 (Note: Finished 4th overall)	16	11	2	9	4	10	7	23	1813
6	Justin Lofton	19	24	7	2 (Note: Finished 8th overall)	4 (Note: Finished 6th overall)	12	5	18	12	19	5	9	12	1742
7	Eric Hardin	20	16	4	3 (Note: Finished 9th overall)	10 (Note: Finished 15th overall)	11	12	6	14	8	13	22	10	1712
8	Brett Thompson	4	21	10	10 (Note: Finished 27th overall)	5 (Note: Finished 7th overall)	14	18	12	6	13	18	10	14	1683
9	Alex Haase	13	9	18	9 (Note: Finished 26th overall)	17 (Note: Finished 27th overall)	7	35	4	16	2	9	20	8	1653
10	Eric Richardson	25	6	17	DNQ	6 (Note: Finished 9th overall)	4	19	9	8	7	17	6	9	1617
11	Jim Inglebright	21	27	20	DNQ	15 (Note: Finished 23rd overall)	6	21	5	10	10	8	4	27	1487
12	Moses Smith	27	28	15	11 (Note: Finished 28th overall)	DNQ	9	28	7	21	11	6	15	17	1418
13	Ryan Foster	10	8	21	DNQ	8 (Note: Finished 11th overall)	3	13	8	22	20			21	1280
14	Daryl Harr		17	23	DNQ	11 (Note: Finished 17th overall)	19	27	10	25	16	19	17	6	1242
15	Andrew Myers	9	26	2	12 (Note: Finished 29th overall)	16 (Note: Finished 25th overall)		38		13	18		8		1064
16	Stan Silva Jr.	22	15	15	DNQ	DNQ	13	8	17	15	21				979
17	Mike Gallegos	28	13	25	DNQ	DNQ	8	25	16	18			16	28	977
18	David Mayhew	6	30			9 (Note: Finished 13th overall)				19		15	3	2	930
19	Rick Wall		25	11			10	17			9	12	DNQ	11	859
20	Tim Woods	7	10	3	6 (Note: Finished 18th overall)	DNQ				24					710
21	José Luis Ramírez	14		27			20	20	11	23					633
22	Eric Holmes		34					4		**3**				1*	586
23	Jamie Dick	26	20	6						20		11			571
24	Lloyd Mack		37	12	DNQ					17		20	14		534
25	Todd Souza		7					14			15		18		499
26	Jeff Barkshire		4			19 (Note: Finished 33rd overall)				30		7			490
27	Jack Sellers	15	23	19	DNQ	DNQ		37		26					487
28	Thomas Martin	24	32							28			12	25	452
29	Marc Davis	12	2					7							443
30	Kyle Cattanach			14		DNQ			13					4	427
31	Tim McCreadie		11			7 (Note: Finished 10th overall)				7					422
32	Wes Banks		19	26				23						18	394
33	Garland Self		39					30			12		13		370
34	Kevin O'Connell							15			17		21		330
35	Scott Lynch	1*				18 (Note: Finished 31st oveall)									299
36	Bobby Hillis Jr.	16	29	22											288
37	Scott Gaylord	17									5				272
38	Joey Logano		1*						32						262
39	Jason Patison									4				24	251
40	Ed Vecchiarelli Sr.						17							19	218
41	David Gilliland							**1***							190
42	Kevin Harvick					**1*** (Note: Finished 2nd overall)									190
43	P. J. Jones							2							170
44	Boris Said							3							170
45	Dennis Dyer							34					19		167
46	Travis McCullough							31					24		161
47	Travis Bennett											4			160
48	Jesus Hernandez		5												155
49	Justin Labonte	8													142
50	Phil Bonifield		38	24											140
51	Kenny Shepherd							9							138
52	Candace Muzny									DNQ				DNQ	137
53	Tom Dyer							10							134
54	Jason Fensler													13	124
55	Brandon Miller		14												121
56	Jason Fraser											14			121
57	Rick Ruzbarsky													15	118
58	Darren Robertson						18								109
59	Brandon Riehl	18													109
60	Jason Gilbert													20	103
61	Ed Vecchiarelli Jr.						21								100
62	Carlos Contreras							22							97
63	Ryan Philpott									DNQ				22	97
64	Bruce Betts		22												97
65	Jeff Barrister												23		94
66	Ben Walker													26	85
67	Victor Pfluger							26							85
68	Linny White									27					82
69	Ryan Black													DNQ	76
70	Greg Pursley									29					76
71	David Ross									DNQ					70
72	Jason Noll													DNQ	70
73	Tim Schendel		31												70
74	Ross Strmiska													DNQ	67
75	Regan Smith							33							64
76	Kyle Gomez									DNQ					61
77	Matt Kobyluck		36												55
78	Scott Ivie							36							55

== See also ==
- 2007 NASCAR Nextel Cup Series
- 2007 NASCAR Busch Series
- 2007 NASCAR Craftsman Truck Series
- 2007 NASCAR Whelen Modified Tour
- 2007 NASCAR Whelen Southern Modified Tour
- 2007 NASCAR Busch East Series
- 2007 NASCAR Canadian Tire Series
- 2007 NASCAR Corona Series
- 2007 ARCA Re/Max Series
