= Douglas County Speedway =

Motorsport track in Oregon, United States

- Location: 2110 Frear Street, Roseburg, Oregon, 97471
- Capacity: 5,000
- Operator: Pacific Racing Association
- Former names: Roseburg Speedway
- Major events: ARCA Menards Series West (1966, 1968–1969, 1971, 2002–2010, 2016–2020); NASCAR Northwest Series (1985, 1998–1999)
- Website: http://douglascountyspeedway.com

Oval
- Surface: Dirt
- Length: 0.375 mi (0.604 km)
- Turns: 4

Douglas County Speedway is a 0.375 mi (0.604 km) dirt motorsport race track in the United States. The track is part of the Douglas County Fairgrounds, located off Interstate 5 in Roseburg, Oregon.

It mostly hosts late model racing, sprint car racing, and other local-level racing events throughout the year, which are held on a weekly basis on Saturdays from May through September. The track is also used for rodeo and monster truck events. The biggest event the track has hosted is the ARCA Menards Series West (formerly the NASCAR K&N Pro Series West), which has held 18 races at the track. The first was in 1966, and the most recent was in 2020.

Due to its small size, the infield is empty (only a patch of grass) and pit road is located outside the track behind the backstretch. The entrance to pit road is located in turn 2, with the exit back onto the track in turn 3.

== Track history ==
The track was named Roseburg Speedway in 1960 and it featured a Hard Top class.

On August 14, 2021, the track hosted the Outlaw 100, a Pacific Racing Association race. The race featured a two-car crash that led to one of the cars almost breaking through the wall and falling off the racetrack and into the track's parking lot. The driver was injured in the crash and taken to the nearby Mercy Medical Center hospital. Because of the heavy damage to the wall, the race ended after only completing 50 of the scheduled 100 laps. One of the drivers in the race was former part-time NASCAR Cup Series and NASCAR West Series driver Brandon Ash, a resident of the track's town of Roseburg.

== Events ==
=== NASCAR ===
Douglas County Speedway hosted the NASCAR/ARCA West Series 18 times on three separate stints. The first was from 1966 to 1971, although there was no race there in 1967 and 1970. The second was from 2002 to 2010, and the most recent was from 2016 to 2020. The track was removed from the West Series schedule in 2021, partly because the schedule was condensed from 11 races to 9. Multiple time winners include: Jack McCoy (2), Austin Cameron (2), Eric Holmes (3), and Derek Kraus (2). Hershel McGriff, Peyton Sellers, Brian Ickler, Ryan Partridge, Todd Gilliland and Blaine Perkins have also won at the track. The NASCAR Northwest Series held races at the track in 1985, 1998, and 1999.
