= Dan Obrist =

American racing driver (born 1946)

- Born: September 27, 1946 (age 80); Portland, Oregon, U.S.

NASCAR Cup Series career
- 1 race run over 1 year
- Best finish: 70th (1995)
- First race: 1995 Save Mart Supermarkets 300 (Sonoma)
Wins	Top tens	Poles
0	0	0

NASCAR FedEx Freight Truck Series career
- 1 race run over 1 year
- Best finish: 107th (1996)
- First race: 1996 Craftsman 200 (Portland)
Wins	Top tens	Poles
0	0	0

ARCA Menards Series West career
- 49 races run over 10 years
- Best finish: 4th (1995)
- First race: 1994 Talk 'N Toss 200 (Portland
- Last race: 2003 NAPA 200 Presented by NAPA Belts & Hose (Douglas County)
Wins	Top tens	Poles
0	26	0
- Statistics up to date as of September 28, 2026.

Dan Obrist (born September 27, 1946) is an American former professional stock car racing driver. He primarily competed in the NASCAR Winston West Series from 1994 to 2003.

== Racing career ==
Obrist began competing in the Winston Racing Series in 1990, winning five times at South Sound Speedway. In 1991, he made two NASCAR Winston Northwest Tour starts at Portland Speedway, finishing fifteenth and eleventh. He competed at the track in the Winston Racing Series from 1991 to 1994, scoring 25 wins and winning the track championship in 1993. Other tracks he competed at locally in the early 1990s included Coos Bay Speedway, Tri-City Raceway, and Yakima Speedway. He won the 1993 Apple Cup at Yakima and would later compete in the race between 2001 and 2015. In 1994, Obrist made his first NASCAR Winston Transcontinental Series starts, scoring a best finish of eleventh at The Bullring at Las Vegas Motor Speedway. In 1995, Obrist ran all but one race in the fifteen race season for the Winston West Series (renamed back from the Winston Transcontinental Series), scoring ten top-ten finishes, including a runner-up at Tucson Raceway Park. He finished fourth in the final standings, which would be a career best. This Winston West schedule included a combination race with the NASCAR Winston Cup Series at Sears Point Raceway, where he finished last in 43rd in his lone points paying Winston Cup start due to ignition issues. Obrist ran eleven Winston West races in 1996, scoring four top-tens. He also made his only career NASCAR Craftsman Truck Series start at Portland, finishing 22nd. He competed in the NASCAR Suzuka Thunder Special at Japan's Suzuka Circuit, finishing 24th, 55 laps down. Obrist ran eight of the first nine Winston West races in 1997, scoring six top-tens. In October, Obrist suffered a massive coronary at Yakima Speedway and was given a 10% chance of living. He would ultimately survive and ran two Winston West races in 1998, finishing fourth at Portland in his first series race back. He again made two starts in 1999, crashing at Evergreen Speedway but finishing second at Portland. Obrist made three Winston West starts in 2000, scoring a best finish of third at Evergreen. He made two starts in 2001 with a best finish of eleventh at Mesa Marin Raceway. He made two starts again in 2002 with a best finish of ninth at Evergreen. Obrist closed out his Winston West career with Bill McAnally Racing in 2003, finishing twelfth at Evergreen and ninth in his final start at Douglas County Speedway. He continued competing in racing until 2016.

== Motorsports career results ==
=== NASCAR ===
(key) (Bold – Pole position awarded by qualifying time. Italics – Pole position earned by points standings or practice time. * – Most laps led.)

==== Winston Cup Series ====
NASCAR Winston Cup Series results
Year	Team	No.	Make	1	2	3	4	5	6	7	8	9	10	11	12	13	14	15	16	17	18	19	20	21	22	23	24	25	26	27	28	29	30	31	NWCSC	Pts	Ref
1995	Dan Obrist	72	Chevy	DAY	CAR	RCH	ATL	DAR	BRI	NWS	MAR	TAL	SON; 43	CLT	DOV	POC	MCH	DAY	NHA	POC	TAL	IND	GLN	MCH	BRI	DAR	RCH	DOV	MAR	NWS	CLT	CAR	PHO	ATL	70th	34	

==== Craftsman Truck Series ====
NASCAR Craftsman Truck Series results
Year	Team	No.	Make	1	2	3	4	5	6	7	8	9	10	11	12	13	14	15	16	17	18	19	20	21	22	23	24	NCTSC	Pts	Ref
1996	Dan Obrist	73	Chevy	HOM	PHO	POR; 22	EVG	TUS	CNS	HPT	BRI	NZH	MLW	LVL	I70	IRP	FLM	GLN	NSV	RCH	NHA	MAR	NWS	SON	MMR	PHO	LVS	107th	97	

==== Winston West Series ====
NASCAR Winston West Series results
Year	Team	No.	Make	1	2	3	4	5	6	7	8	9	10	11	12	13	14	15	NWWSC	Pts	Ref
1994	Dan Obrist	09	Pontiac	MMR	TUS	SON	SGS	YAK	MMR	POR; 17	IND	CAJ	TCR						31st	369	
1994	Dan Obrist	09	Chevy											LVS; 11	MMR; 12	PHO	TUS		31st	369	
1995	Dan Obrist	12	Chevy	TUS; 6	MMR; 9		CNS; 11	MMR; 4	POR; 23	SGS; 14	TUS; 2	AMP; 3	MAD; 8	POR; 4	LVS; 3		MMR; 8	PHO	4th	1988	
1995	Dan Obrist	72	Chevy			SON; 43													4th	1988	
1995	Dan Obrist	12	Pontiac													SON; 6			4th	1988	
1996	Dan Obrist	12	Chevy	TUS; 23	AMP; 24	MMR; 16	SON	MAD	POR; 6	TUS; 15	EVG; 7	CNS	MAD; 20	MMR; 7	SON; 18	MMR; 3	PHO	LVS; 16	11th	1352	
1997	Dan Obrist	12	Chevy	TUS; 10	AMP; 5	SON	TUS; 5	MMR; 18	LVS; 13	CAL; 10	EVG; 3	POR; 10	PPR	AMP	SON	MMR	LVS		10th	1115	
1998	Richard Kieper	93	Chevy	TUS	LVS	PHO	CAL	HPT	MMR	AMP	POR; 4	CAL	PPR	EVG; 11	SON	MMR	LVS		44th	290	
1999	Dan Obrist	21	Chevy	TUS	LVS	PHO	CAL	PPR	MMR	IRW	EVG; 21	POR; 2	IRW	RMR	LVS	MMR	MOT		45th	270	
2000	Dan Obrist	21	Chevy	PHO	MMR	LVS	CAL	LAG	IRW	POR; 7	EVG; 3	IRW	RMR						25th	412	
2000	Dan Obrist	1	Chevy											MMR; 24	IRW				25th	412	
2001	Dan Obrist	29	Chevy	PHO	LVS	TUS	MMR; 11	CAL	IRW	LAG	KAN	EVG; 18	CNS	IRW	RMR	LVS	IRW		38th	239	
2002	Dan Obrist	12	Chevy	PHO	LVS	CAL	KAN	EVG; 9	IRW	S99	RMR	DCS; 22	LVS						32nd	240	
2003	Bill McAnally Racing	12	Chevy	PHO	LVS	CAL	MAD	TCR	EVG; 12	IRW	S99	RMR	DCS; 9	PHO	MMR				29th	265	
