= Jeff Jefferson (racing driver) =

American racing driver and team owner (born 1972)

- Born: February 17, 1972 (age 54); Naches, Washington, U.S.
- Awards: West Coast Stock Car Hall of Fame (2025)

NASCAR FedEx Freight Truck Series career
- 1 race run over 1 year
- Best finish: 102nd (2004)
- First race: 2004 Black Cat Fireworks 200 (Milwaukee)
Wins	Top tens	Poles
0	0	0

ARCA Menards Series West career
- 39 races run over 10 years
- Best finish: 13th (2000)
- First race: 1999 Coors Light 200 Pres. by Albertson's (Evergreen)
- Last race: 2018 NAPA Auto Parts Idaho 208 (Meridian)
- First win: 2000 NAPA Auto Parts 200 (Portland)
Wins	Top tens	Poles
1	18	2
- Statistics up to date as of June 3, 2025.

Jeff Jefferson (born February 17, 1972) is an American professional stock car racing driver and team owner who has previously competed in the NASCAR Craftsman Truck Series and the NASCAR Winston West Series. He is the former co-owner of Jefferson Pitts Racing.

Jefferson has also competed in series such as the Late Model Truck Series and the South West Tour Truck Series.

== Motorsports career results ==
=== NASCAR ===
(key) (Bold - Pole position awarded by qualifying time. Italics - Pole position earned by points standings or practice time. * – Most laps led.)

==== Winston Cup Series ====
NASCAR Winston Cup Series results
Year	Team	No.	Make	1	2	3	4	5	6	7	8	9	10	11	12	13	14	15	16	17	18	19	20	21	22	23	24	25	26	27	28	29	30	31	32	33	34	35	36	NWCC	Pts	Ref
2002	Quest Motor Racing	37	Ford	DAY	CAR	LVS	ATL	DAR	BRI	TEX	MAR	TAL	CAL	RCH	CLT	DOV	POC	MCH	SON	DAY	CHI	NHA	POC	IND	GLN	MCH	BRI	DAR	RCH	NHA	DOV	KAN	TAL	CLT	MAR	ATL	CAR	PHO; DNQ	HOM	N/A	0	

==== Craftsman Truck Series ====
NASCAR Craftsman Truck Series results
Year	Team	No.	Make	1	2	3	4	5	6	7	8	9	10	11	12	13	14	15	16	17	18	19	20	21	22	23	24	25	NCTC	Pts	Ref
2004	Ron Rhodes Racing	48	Dodge	DAY	ATL	MAR	MFD	CLT	DOV	TEX	MEM	MLW; 28	KAN	KEN	GTW	MCH	IRP	NSH	BRI	RCH	NHA	LVS	CAL	TEX	MAR	PHO	DAR		102nd	79	
2004	Team EJP Racing	03	Chevy																									HOM; DNQ	102nd	79	

==== K&N Pro Series West ====
NASCAR K&N Pro Series West results
Year	Team	No.	Make	1	2	3	4	5	6	7	8	9	10	11	12	13	14	NKNPSWC	Pts	Ref
1999	Jefferson Racing	95	Ford	TUS	LVS	PHO	CAL	PPR	MMR	IRW	EVG; 10							42nd	307	
1999	Jefferson Racing	97	Ford									POR; 24	IRW	RMR	LVS	MMR; DNQ	MOT	42nd	307	
2000	Jefferson Racing	95	Ford	PHO; 27		LVS; 25	CAL; 9	LAG	IRW; 20	**POR**; 1*	**EVG**; 5	IRW; 4	RMR; 19	MMR; 6	IRW; 25			13th	1344	
2000	Jefferson Racing	5	Chevy		MMR; 28													13th	1344	
2001	Jefferson Racing	95	Ford	PHO	LVS	TUS	MMR; 10	CAL	IRW	LAG	KAN	EVG; 21	CNS	IRW	RMR	LVS	IRW	40th	234	
2002	James Morgan	33	Ford	PHO; 20	LVS; 8	CAL; 21		EVG; 16	IRW	S99	RMR	DCS	LVS					18th	569	
2002	James Morgan	33	Chevy				KAN; 18											18th	569	
2003	Bill McAnally Racing	16	Chevy	PHO	LVS	CAL	MAD	TCR; 5	EVG; 4	IRW	S99	RMR	DCS	PHO	MMR			28th	315	
2004	Bill McAnally Racing	20	Chevy	PHO	MMR	CAL	S99	EVG; 2	IRW	S99	RMR	DCS	PHO	CNS	MMR	IRW		46th	170	
2006	Thompson Motorsports	61	Chevy	PHO	PHO	S99	IRW	SON	DCS	IRW	EVG; 4	S99	CAL	CTS	AMP			47th	160	
2008	Cynthia Warn	42	Chevy	AAS; 11	PHO; 3	CTS; 14	IOW; 10	CNS; 17	SON; 29	IRW; 25	DCS; 16	EVG; 4	MMP; 6	IRW; 16	AMP; 18	AAS		15th	1475	
2009	Jefferson Racing	42	Chevy	CTS	AAS	PHO	MAD	IOW	DCS	SON	IRW	PIR	MMP	CNS; 5	IOW	AAS		50th	155	
2018	Jefferson Pitts Racing	27	Ford	KCR	TUS	TUS	OSS	CNS	SON	DCS; 7	IOW	EVG	GTW	LVS	MER; 8	AAS	KCR	25th	73	
