= ARCA races at Las Vegas =

Annual stock car races in Las Vegas, U.S.

ARCA Menards Series West at Las Vegas
ARCA Menards Series West
- Venue: Current: The Bullring at Las Vegas Motor Speedway; Former: Las Vegas Motor Speedway; The Dirt Track at Las Vegas Motor Speedway
- Location: Las Vegas, Navada, United States

Stock car racing events in the ARCA Menards Series West have been held in the Las Vegas metropolitan area during numerous tracks, seasons, and times of year since 1994.

== Las Vegas Motor Speedway ==
The Orleans 150
- Venue: Las Vegas Motor Speedway
- First race: 1996
- Last race: 2002
- Distance: 150 mi (241.4 km)
- Laps: 150
- Previous names: Las Vegas 300K (1996); Cactus Clash (1997–1998); The Orleans 150 (1999–2000, 2002); The 24 Hour Fitness 150 (2001); Second races Winston West 300K (1997); Sam's Town 125 (1998); Gold Coast 150 (1999)

Circuit information
- Surface: Asphalt
- Length: 1.5 mi (2.4 km)
- Turns: 4

The Orleans 150 was an ARCA Menards Series West race held annually at Las Vegas Motor Speedway in Las Vegas, Nevada. Scott Lynch is the final winner, having won it in 2002.

=== History ===
The NASCAR Winston West Series made their debut at Las Vegas Motor Speedway in 1996, when the track opened, with Ken Schrader taking the victory. The series stayed at LVMS, where from 1997–1999, the track hosted two races. The race was removed from the schedule following the 2002 season.

=== Past winners ===
Year	Date	No.	Driver	Team	Manufacturer	Race Distance		Race Time	Average Speed (mph)	Report	Ref
Year	Date	No.	Driver	Team	Manufacturer	Laps	Miles (km)	Race Time	Average Speed (mph)	Report	Ref
1996	November 2	52	Ken Schrader	Ken Schrader Racing	Chevrolet	125	187.5 (301.75)	1:28:22	127.31	Report	
1997	June 7	45	Gary Smith	John Strauser	Chevrolet (2)	100	150 (241.4)	1:23:16	108.088	Report	
1997	November 8	33	Ken Schrader (2)	Andy Petree Racing	Chevrolet (3)	125	187.5 (301.75)	1:42:12	110.078	Report	
1998	February 25	75	Kevin Harvick	Spears Motorsports	Chevrolet (4)	100	150 (241.4)	1:21:21	110.633	Report	
1998	November 7	92	Andy Houston	Addington Racing	Chevrolet (5)	125	187.5 (301.75)	1:40:32	111.903	Report	
1999	March 5	9	Jerry Nadeau	Melling Racing	Chevrolet (6)	100	150 (241.4)	1:26:23	104.368	Report	
1999	September 25	85	Kevin Richards	Monaco Enterprises	Chevrolet (7)	100	150 (241.4)	1:21:01	111.088	Report	
2000	April 22	35	David Starr	Mike Starr Racing	Chevrolet (8)	100	150 (241.4)	1:29:55	100.093	Report	
2001	October 13	16	Brendan Gaughan	Bill McAnally Racing	Chevrolet (9)	100	150 (241.4)	1:18:45	114.286	Report	
2002	October 12	08	Scott Lynch	Windward Racing Enterprises	Chevrolet (10)	100	150 (241.4)	1:18:08	115.188	Report	

==== Manufacturer wins ====
# Wins	Make	Years Won
10	(United States) Chevrolet	1996–2002

== The Bullring at Las Vegas Motor Speedway ==
Kyle Busch Classic
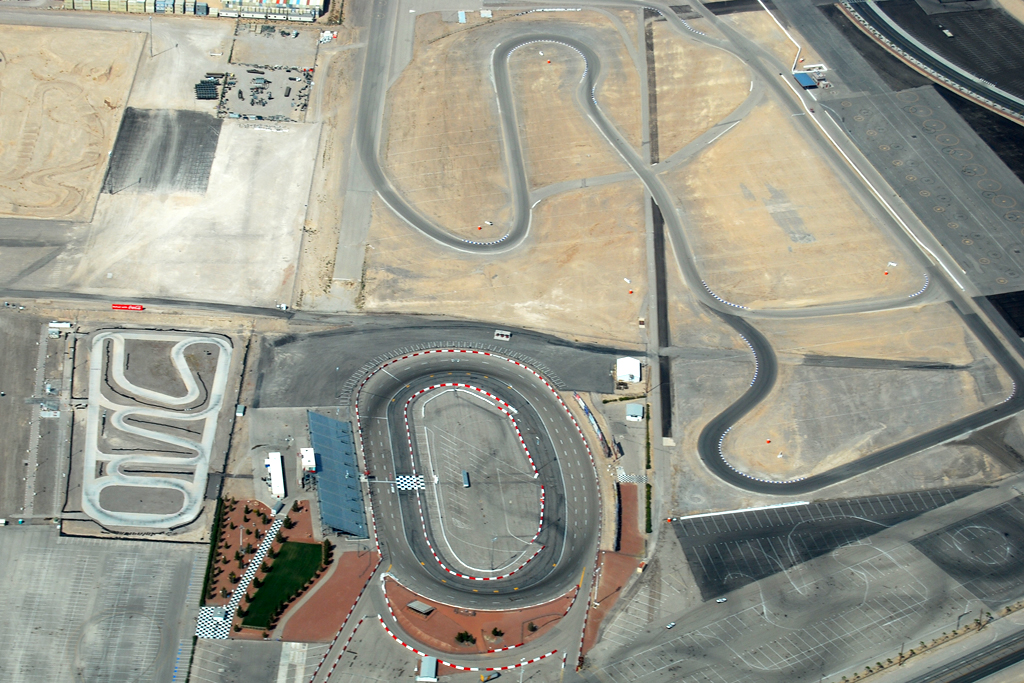
- Venue: The Bullring at Las Vegas Motor Speedway
- First race: 1996
- Distance: 56.625 mi (91.129 km)
- Laps: 151
- Previous names: Las Vegas Events 200 (1994); Miller Genuine Draft 200 (1995); NAPA 300 (2001); Orleans 222 (2002–2003); O'Reilly Auto Parts 200 (2011); Star Nursery 200 (2012); Star Nursery 150 (2020–2023, 2025); Kyle Busch Classic (2026); Second races General Tire 150 (2020)

Circuit information
- Surface: Asphalt
- Length: 0.375 mi (0.604 km)
- Turns: 4

The Kyle Busch Classic is an ARCA Menards Series West race held annually at The Bullring at Las Vegas Motor Speedway in Las Vegas, Nevada. Taylor Mayhew is the defending race winner, having won it in 2026.

=== History ===
The NASCAR Winston Transcontinental Series made their debut at The Bullring at Las Vegas Motor Speedway in 1994. The series stayed at The Bullring at LVMS the following year before getting removed from the schedule. The race returned to the schedule for the 2001 season and would remain until the 2003 season.

The race returned from 2011–2012 before being removed. The race was added back onto the schedule in 2020 and would host two events, as it replaces a race originally scheduled to be held at Meridian Speedway. The race has been held from 2021–2023 and 2025–present.

=== Past winners ===
Year	Date	No.	Driver	Team	Manufacturer	Race Distance		Race Time	Average Speed (mph)	Report	Ref
Year	Date	No.	Driver	Team	Manufacturer	Laps	Miles (km)	Race Time	Average Speed (mph)	Report	Ref
1994	September 17	75	Ron Hornaday Jr.	Spears Motorsports	Chevrolet	200	75 (120.7)	1:24:48	53.066	Report	
1995	September 23	10	Ernie Cope	Lew Miller Racing	Chevrolet (2)	200	75 (120.7)	1:13:56	60.865	Report	
1997 - 2000	Not held										
2001	March 1	4	Mark Reed	Reed Racing	Pontiac	300	112.5 (181.051)	1:56:56	57.725	Report	
2002	April 13	16	Austin Cameron	Bill McAnally Racing	Chevrolet (3)	222	83.25 (133.98)	1:23:57	59.5	Report	
2003	April 12	20	Jim Inglebright	Bill McAnally Racing (2)	Chevrolet (4)	222	83.25 (133.98)	1:20:20	62.178	Report	
2004 - 2010	Not held										
2011	June 11	26	Greg Pursley	Gene Price Motorsports	Ford	200	75 (120.7)	1:23:03	54.184	Report	
2012	June 2	26	Greg Pursley (2)	Gene Price Motorsports (2)	Ford (2)	200	75 (120.7)	1:23:00	54.217	Report	
2013 - 2019	Not held										
2020	February 20	21	Sam Mayer	GMS Racing	Chevrolet (5)	150	56.25 (90.526)	0:47:52	70.508	Report	
2020	September 26	99	Gracie Trotter	Bill McAnally Racing (3)	Toyota	150	56.25 (90.526)	0:52:14	64.614	Report	
2021	September 23	17E	Taylor Gray	David Gilliland Racing	Ford (3)	150	56.25 (90.526)	0:52:21	64.47	Report	
2022	October 14	71	Taylor Gray (2)	David Gilliland Racing (2)	Ford (4)	158*	59.25 (95.43)	1:11:11	49.895	Report	
2023	October 13	88	Dylan Cappello	Naake-Klauer Motorsports	Ford (5)	155*	58.125 (93.543)	1:02:57	55.401	Report	
2024	Not held										
2025	October 10	50	Trevor Huddleston	High Point Racing	Ford (6)	150	56.25 (90.526)	0:58:00	58.19	Report	
2026	October 2	17	Taylor Mayhew	Cook Racing Technologies	Chevrolet (6)	167*	62.625 (100.79)	1:06:10	56.788	Report	

- 2022, 2023 & 2026: Race extended due to a green–white–checker finish.

==== Manufacturer wins ====
# Wins	Make	Years Won
6	(United States) Ford	2011–2012, 2021–2023, 2025
6	(United States) Chevrolet	1994–1995, 2002–2003, 2020 (race 1), 2026
1	(United States) Pontiac	2001
1	(Japan) Toyota	2020 (race 2)

== The Dirt Track at Las Vegas Motor Speedway ==
Star Nursery 100
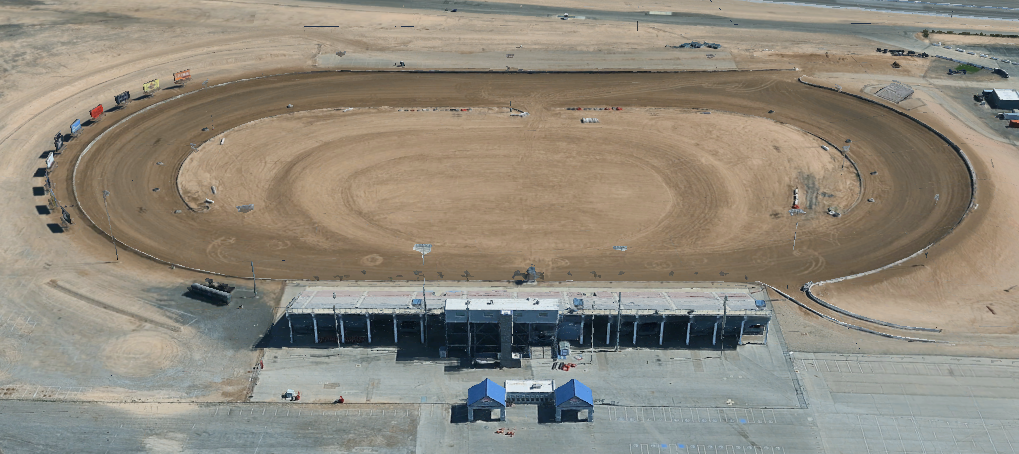
- Venue: The Dirt Track at Las Vegas Motor Speedway
- First race: 2018
- Last race: 2019
- Distance: 50 mi (80.467 km)
- Laps: 100
- Previous names: Star Nursery 100 (2018–2019)

Circuit information
- Surface: Dirt
- Length: 0.500 mi (0.805 km)
- Turns: 4

The Star Nursery 100 was a NASCAR K&N Pro Series West race held at The Dirt Track at Las Vegas Motor Speedway in 2018 and 2019, Hailie Deegan is the final winner, having won it in 2019.

=== History ===
In 2018, it was announced that the NASCAR K&N Pro Series West would compete at The Dirt Track at Las Vegas Motor Speedway. It marked the first time the NASCAR K&N Pro Series West competed on a dirt surface. In 2018, Sheldon Creed won the event and in 2019, Hailie Deegan won the event on a dramatic last-lap pass.

=== Past heat race winners ===
Year	Date	Race	No.	Driver	Team	Manufacturer	Race Distance		Race Time	Average Speed (mph)	Report	Ref
Year	Date	Race	No.	Driver	Team	Manufacturer	Laps	Miles (km)	Race Time	Average Speed (mph)	Report	Ref
2018	September 13	1	19	Hailie Deegan	Bill McAnally Racing	Toyota	11*	5.5 (8.85)	0:05:39	58.344	Report	
2018	September 13	2	16	Derek Kraus	Bill McAnally Racing (2)	Toyota (2)	10	5 (8.047)	0:03:36	83.301	Report	
2018	September 13	3	6	Derek Thorn	Sunrise Ford Racing	Ford	10	5 (8.047)	0:03:39	82.129	Report	
2018	September 13	4	99	Cole Rouse	Bill McAnally Racing (3)	Toyota (3)	10	5 (8.047)	0:03:39	82.194	Report	
2019	February 28	1	14	Austin Reed	Dave Reed	Toyota (4)	12	6 (9.66)	0:04:42	76.358	Report	
2019	February 28	2	16	Derek Kraus (2)	Bill McAnally Racing (4)	Toyota (5)	12	6 (9.66)	0:04:45	75.622	Report	

- 2018 Heat Race #1: Race extended due to a green–white–checker finish.

==== Manufacturer wins ====
# Wins	Make	Years Won
5	(Japan) Toyota	2018 (Heat Races #1, #2, #4), 2019 (Heat Races #1, #2)
1	(United States) Ford	2018 (Heat Race #3)

=== Past race winners ===
Year	Date	No.	Driver	Team	Manufacturer	Race Distance		Race Time	Average Speed (mph)	Report	Ref
Year	Date	No.	Driver	Team	Manufacturer	Laps	Miles (km)	Race Time	Average Speed (mph)	Report	Ref
2018	September 13	24	Sheldon Creed	Norman-Levin Racing	Chevrolet	102*	51 (82.077)	1:15:06	40.746	Report	
2019	February 28	19	Hailie Deegan	Bill McAnally Racing	Toyota	100	50 (80.467)	0:52:09	57.526	Report	

- 2018: Race extended due to a green–white–checker finish.

==== Manufacturer wins ====
# Wins	Make	Years Won
1	(United States) Chevrolet	2018
1	(Japan) Toyota	2019

Previous race: Madera 150	ARCA Menards Series West; Kyle Busch Classic	Next race: Desert Diamond Casino West Valley 100
