= 1999 NASCAR Winston West Series =

46th season of the NASCAR Winston West Series

The 1999 NASCAR Winston West Series was the 46th season of the series. The title was won by Sean Woodside, his first in the series.

== Schedule and results ==
The 1999 season included 14 individual races, although Las Vegas Motor Speedway, Mesa Marin Raceway, and Irwindale Speedway hosted two races each. The series finale would be held outside the United States, running at Twin Ring Motegi Superspeedway in Japan.

| Date | Name | Racetrack | Location | Winner |
|---|---|---|---|---|
| January 17 | Winston West 200 | Tucson Raceway Park | Tucson, Arizona | Sean Woodside |
| March 5 | The Orleans 150 | Las Vegas Motor Speedway | Las Vegas, Nevada | Jerry Nadeau |
| March 27 | NAPA Auto Parts 100 | Phoenix International Raceway | Avondale, Arizona | Mike Wallace |
| May 1 | California 200 | California Speedway | Fontana, California | Ricky Craven |
| May 16 | King Soopers 150 | Pikes Peak International Raceway | Fountain, Colorado | Mike Wallace |
| May 30 | Forum Marketing 200 | Mesa Marin Raceway | Bakersfield, California | Butch Gilliland |
| June 19 | Irwindale 250 presented by Jan's Towing | Irwindale Speedway | Irwindale, California | Steve Portenga |
| July 18 | Coors Light 200 Pres. by Albertson's | Evergreen Speedway | Monroe, Washington | Kevin Richards |
| August 14 | Grainger Industrial Supply 200 Pres. by TCI | Portland Speedway | Portland, Oregon | Bill Sedgwick |
| August 21 | Snap-On 250 Benefitting City of Hope | Irwindale Speedway | Irwindale, California | Austin Cameron |
| September 6 | Bank One 250 | Rocky Mountain Raceways | West Valley City, Utah | Butch Gilliland |
| September 25 | Gold Coast 150 | Las Vegas Motor Speedway | Las Vegas, Nevada | Kevin Richards |
| October 17 | Re-Refined Oil 250 | Mesa Marin Raceway | Bakersfield, California | Sean Woodside |
| November 20 | '99 NASCAR Coca-Cola 500 | Twin Ring Motegi Superspeedway | Motegi City, Japan | Kevin Richards |

== Full Drivers' Championship ==
(key) Bold – Pole position awarded by time. Italics – Pole position set by owner's points. * – Most laps led.

| Pos | Driver | TUS | LVS | PHO | CAL | PPR | MMR | IRW | EVG | POR | IRW | RMR | LVS | MMR | MOT | Pts |
|---|---|---|---|---|---|---|---|---|---|---|---|---|---|---|---|---|
| 1 | Sean Woodside | 1 | 15 | 7 | 9 | 3* | 15 | 13 | 2 | **6*** | 10 | **6** | 17 | 1 | 5 | 2075 |
| 2 | Austin Cameron | 14 | 5 | 3 | **29** | 2 | 6 | 23 | 13 | 7 | 1* | 17 | 2 | 15 | 2 | 1981 |
| 3 | Joe Bean | 9 | 13 | 21 | 8 | 9 | 9 | 21 | 5 | 10 | 4 | 11 | 5 | 3 | 7 | 1955 |
| 4 | Kevin Richards | 13 | 10 | 26 | 23 | 26 | 17 | 9 | 1 | 5 | 2 | 10 | 1* | 13 | 1 | 1910 |
| 5 | Steve Portenga | 12 | 20 | 9 | 7 | 7 | 7 | 1* | 20 | 4 | 15 | 20 | 9 | 19 | 6 | 1889 |
| 6 | Jason Small | **16** | 7 | 25 | 33 | 8 | 5 | 6 | 8 | 11 | 14 | 4 | 14 | 6 | 9 | 1845 |
| 7 | Mike Chase | 6 | 6 | 2 | 5 | 5 | 19 | 18 | 9 | 3 | 26 | 16 | 10 | 20 | 25 | 1838 |
| 8 | Brandon Ash | 2 | 9 | 5 | 11 | 17 | 2 | 7 | 3 | 22 | 16 | 18 | 15 | 25 | 20 | 1831 |
| 9 | Sammy Potashnick | 10 | 4 | 24 | 22 | 16 | 10 | 8 | 14 | 20 | **5** | 3* | 8 | 14 | 11 | 1830 |
| 10 | Butch Gilliland | 17 | 29 | 8 | 6 | 27 | **1*** | **3** | 17 | 25 | 3 | 1 | 4 | 23 | 21 | 1821 |
| 11 | Eric Norris | 19 | 12 | 18 | 12 | 4 | 8 | 10 | 18 | 12 | 19 | 12 | 6 | 17 | 3 | 1821 |
| 12 | Bill Sedgwick | 3* | DNQ | 29 | 24 | 20 | 4 | 2 | 4 | 1 | 6 | 7 | 12* | **2*** | | 1789 |
| 13 | Brendan Gaughan | 26 | 25 | 20 | 31 | 10 | 12 | 15 | 16 | 17 | 9 | 2 | **3** | 8 | 4 | 1742 |
| 14 | John Metcalf | 5 | 35 | 11 | 28 | 12 | 18 | 12 | 7 | 23 | 17 | 15 | 14 | 21 | 10 | 1620 |
| 15 | Wayne Jacks | DNQ | | 13 | 19 | 28 | 21 | 24 | 19 | 8 | 7 | 19 | 18 | 18 | 26 | 1376 |
| 16 | Gary Smith | 24 | 17 | 22 | 32 | | | | 6 | 19 | 8 | 5 | 19 | 5 | 14 | 1302 |
| 17 | Jerry Cain | DNQ | 11 | 27 | 15 | 14 | 13 | 28 | 11 | 15 | 22 | | 24 | 12 | | 1293 |
| 18 | Doc Faustina | | 31 | | | DNQ | 14 | 17 | DNQ | 16 | 12 | 13 | 23 | | 27 | 1067 |
| 19 | Rick Ware | 28 | 22 | 16 | 34 | 13 | 16 | 14 | 15 | | | | 21 | | | 930 |
| 20 | Scott Gaylord | 11 | 36 | 10 | 36 | 15 | | | | | | 9 | | 24 | 16 | 846 |
| 21 | Mike Wallace | | | **1*** | 4 | **1** | | 5 | | | | | | | **19*** | 801 |
| 22 | Bobby Dotter | 7 | 28 | 6 | 13 | 6 | | | | | | | | | 24 | 740 |
| 23 | Tony Toste | 15 | 27 | 12 | 18 | | | | | | | | 7 | 22 | | 684 |
| 24 | Ron Hornaday Jr. | | 2 | 4 | | | | 4 | | | | | | 4 | | 655 |
| 25 | Davy Lee Liniger | | | 28 | | 21 | 20 | 20 | 12 | 9 | | | | | | 650 |
| 26 | Billy Turner | DNQ | 14 | 31 | 21 | 19 | | | | | | | | | 13 | 591 |
| 27 | Dean Kuhn | 23 | DNQ | | 20 | | 22 | 11 | | | | | | | 28 | 546 |
| 28 | Bobby Pangonis | DNQ | 34 | DNQ | DNQ | | | 26 | | 13 | | | | 22 | | 526 |
| 29 | Kevin Culver | | 21 | | | | | 27 | 22 | 18 | | | | | 18 | 497 |
| 30 | Kenny Smith | DNQ | 30 | | DNQ | | | 19 | | | 21 | | 25 | | | 477 |
| 31 | Mike Duncan | 25 | 26 | 23 | 17 | | | | | | | | 27 | | | 466 |
| 32 | Rick Carelli | 4 | 16 | | 3 | | | | | | | | | | | 445 |
| 33 | Jerry Glanville | | 18 | 17 | 16 | 18 | | | | | | | | | | 445 |
| 34 | Rick Bogart | DNQ | | 30 | 30 | 25 | | | | | | | 11 | | | 425 |
| 35 | David Gilliland | 22 | | | | | 24 | | | | | | 26 | 7 | | 419 |
| 36 | Jeff Murray | | | DNQ | | | | 16 | | | 13 | | | DNQ | | 376 |
| 37 | Ross Thompson | | | 19 | 10 | 11 | | | | | | | | | | 375 |
| 38 | Billy Kann | | DNQ | 32 | DNQ | 24 | | | | | 11 | | | | | 371 |
| 39 | Ron Burns | 20 | 19 | 14 | | | | | | | | | | | | 330 |
| 40 | Ken Schrader | | | | 2* | | | | | | | 8 | | | | 327 |
| 41 | Kurt Busch | | 8 | | 27 | | | 22 | | | | | | | | 326 |
| 42 | Jeff Jefferson | | | | | | | | 10 | 24 | | | | DNQ | | 307 |
| 43 | Mike Borkowski | | | | | | | | DNQ | 21 | | | 20 | | | 288 |
| 44 | Ricky Craven | | 23 | | 1 | | | | | | | | | | | 279 |
| 45 | Dan Obrist | | | | | | | | 21 | 2 | | | | | | 270 |
| 46 | Jack Sellers | | | | | | 23 | | | | 23 | | 29 | | | 264 |
| 47 | David Starr | | 32 | | 35 | | | | | | | | 16 | | | 240 |
| 48 | Gene Christensen | | | | | | | | 24 | | | 14 | | | | 212 |
| 49 | Christian Elder | | | 15 | 26 | | | | | | | | | | | 203 |
| 50 | Travis Powell | | | | | | | | DNQ | 14 | | | | | | 203 |
| 51 | Troy Cline | | | DNQ | | | | | | | | | | 10 | | 198 |
| 52 | Jeff Barister | | | | | | | 25 | | | 20 | | | | | 191 |
| 53 | Jerry Nadeau | | **1*** | | | | | | | | | | | | | 185 |
| 54 | Manabu Orido | | | | | | | | | | 18 | | | | 30 | 182 |
| 55 | Bobby Hamilton Jr. | | 3 | | | | | | | | | | | | | 170 |
| 56 | Kevin Harvick | | | | | | 3 | | | | | | | | | 165 |
| 57 | Charlie Solomon | DNQ | | | | | | | | | | | | 16 | | 164 |
| 58 | Kim Jane | | | | | | | | | | | | | | 8 | 142 |
| 59 | Lance Hooper | 8 | | | | | | | | | | | | | | 142 |
| 60 | Mike Dillard | 18 | DNQ | | | | | | | | | | | | | 140 |
| 61 | Eric Holmes | | | | | | | | | | | | | 9 | | 138 |
| 62 | Bob Howard | | DNQ | | | 23 | | | | | | | | | | 134 |
| 63 | Rob Morgan | | 33 | | | 32 | | | | | | | | | | 131 |
| 64 | Greg Pursley | | | | | | | | | | | | | 11 | | 130 |
| 65 | John Young | | | | | | 11 | | | | | | | | | 130 |
| 66 | Ron Barfield Jr. | | | | | | | | | | | | | | 12 | 127 |
| 67 | Darrel Krentz | | DNQ | | 25 | | | | | | | | | | | 125 |
| 68 | Craig Raudman | | | | 14 | | | | | | | | | | | 121 |
| 69 | Hideo Fukuyama | | | | | | | | | | | | | | 15 | 118 |
| 70 | Andy Houston | | | | | | | | | | | | | | 17 | 112 |
| 71 | Scott Saunders | DNQ | | | | DNQ | | | | | | | | | | 110 |
| 72 | Bow Carpenter | | DNQ | DNQ | | | | | | | | | | | | 110 |
| 73 | Kelly Tanner | | | | | | | | **23*** | | | | | | | 104 |
| 74 | Rick Rose | 21 | | | | | | | | | | | | | | 100 |
| 75 | M. K. Kanke | | | | | 22 | | | | | | | | | | 97 |
| 76 | Keiichi Tsuchiya | | | | | | | | | | | | | | 22 | 97 |
| 77 | Neville Lance | | | | | | | | | | | | | | 23 | 94 |
| 78 | Rod Bennett | | | | | | | | | | 24 | | | | | 91 |
| 79 | Scott Busby | | 24 | | | | | | | | | | | | | 91 |
| 80 | Mike Ficklin | | | | | | | | | | 25 | | | | | 88 |
| 81 | Gary Collins | | | | | | | | | | | | | 26 | | 85 |
| 82 | Lance Wade | 27 | | | | | | | | | | | | | | 82 |
| 83 | Rich DeLong Jr. | | | | | | | | | | 27 | | | | | 82 |
| 84 | Bobby Gerhart | | | | | | | | | | | | 28 | | | 79 |
| 85 | Al Edgerly | | | | | 29 | | | | | | | | | | 76 |
| 86 | Tommy Fry | | | | | | | | | | | | | DNQ | | 76 |
| 87 | Terry Wyhoon | | | | | | | | | | | | | | 29 | 76 |
| 88 | Jerry Spilsbury | | | | | 30 | | | | | | | | | | 73 |
| 89 | Larry Carnes | | | | | 31 | | | | | | | | | | 70 |
| 90 | Jeff Streeter | DNQ | | | | | | | | | | | | | | 64 |
| 91 | Bo Lemler | DNQ | | | | | | | | | | | | | | 58 |
| 92 | Blair Aiken | DNQ | | | | | | | | | | | | | | 55 |
| 93 | T. J. Clark | | DNQ | | | | | | | | | | | | | 52 |
| 94 | St. James Davis | | | | DNQ | | | | | | | | | | | 46 |
| 95 | Jeff Ward | | DNQ | | | | | | | | | | | | | 28 |
| 96 | Jeff Marmack | | DNQ | | | | | | | | | | | | | 25 |
| 97 | Mike David | DNQ | | | | | | | | | | | | | | 0 |

== See also ==
- 1999 NASCAR Winston Cup Series
- 1999 NASCAR Busch Series
- 1999 NASCAR Craftsman Truck Series
- 1999 NASCAR Goody's Dash Series
- 1999 ARCA Bondo/Mar-Hyde Series
