= Budweiser 200 =

There have been five NASCAR Busch Series races named Budweiser 200:

- Budweiser 200 (Caraway), held at Caraway Speedway in 1982
- Budweiser 200 (Dover), held at Dover Downs International Speedway from 1984 to 1991
- Budweiser 200 (Bristol), held at Bristol International Raceway from 1985 to 1989
- Budweiser 200 (Jefco), held at Jefco Speedway from 1986 to 1987
- Carolina Pride / Budweiser 200, held at Myrtle Beach Speedway from 1989 to 1990

Budweiser 200 may also refer to:

- Budweiser 200 (Madera)
- Budweiser 200 (Mesa Marin)
