= 1998 NASCAR Winston West Series =

45th season of the NASCAR Winston West Series

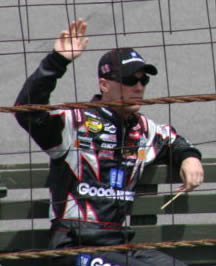
Kevin Harvick, the 1998 West Series champion.

The 1998 NASCAR Winston West Series was the 45th season of the series. The title was won by future NASCAR Cup Series champion Kevin Harvick, his first in the series.

== Schedule and results ==
The 1998 season included 14 individual races, although Las Vegas Motor Speedway, California Speedway, and Mesa Marin Raceway hosted two races each. Unlike in past years, there were no combination races with the NASCAR Winston Cup Series.

Date	Name	Racetrack	Location	Winner
January 11	Winston West 200	Tucson Raceway Park	Tucson, Arizona	Butch Gilliland
February 25	Cactus Clash	Las Vegas Motor Speedway	Las Vegas, Nevada	Kevin Harvick
April 19	Phoenix 150	Phoenix International Raceway	Avondale, Arizona	Rich Woodland Jr.
May 2	Auto Club 200	California Speedway	Fontana, California	Ken Schrader
May 17	LUKOil 250K	Heartland Park Topeka	Topeka, Kansas	Sean Woodside
May 24	Re-Refined Oil Memorial Day 200	Mesa Marin Raceway	Bakersfield, California	Butch Gilliland
June 14	Spears Manufacturing 200	Altamont Motorsports Park	Tracy, California	Kevin Harvick
July 10	TCI Digital Cable 200	Portland Speedway	Portland, Oregon	Gary Smith
July 18	California 200	California Speedway	Fontana, California	Kevin Harvick
July 26	Kidde Safety 200	Pikes Peak International Raceway	Fountain, Colorado	Kevin Harvick
August 15	Coors Light 200	Evergreen Speedway	Monroe, Washington	Butch Gilliland
October 11	Iomega/Fry's 100	Sears Point Raceway	Sonoma, California	Kevin Harvick
October 17	Spears Manufacturing 250	Mesa Marin Raceway	Bakersfield, California	Sean Woodside
November 7	Sam's Town 125	Las Vegas Motor Speedway	Las Vegas, Nevada	Andy Houston

== Full Drivers' Championship ==
(key) Bold – Pole position awarded by time. Italics – Pole position set by owner's points. * – Most laps led.

Pos	Driver	TUS	LVS	PHO	CAL	HPT	MMR	AMP	POR	CAL	PPR	EVG	SON	MMR	LVS	Pts
1	Kevin Harvick	13	**1***	**2***	2	**4***	**21**	1	7	**1***	1*	3	1	5	3	2315
2	Sean Woodside	4	9	4	4	1	7*	**5***	3	3	4	8	14	**1***	10	2215
3	Gary Smith	7	6	3	28	7	2	2	1*	13	31	2	30	2	17	1945
4	Austin Cameron		32	6	8	9	10	3	6	2	2	12	3	7	4	1909
5	Kevin Richards	8	30	7	11	2	6	14	9	25	13	5	4	4	11	1897
6	Butch Gilliland	1	16	23	27	22	1	15	2	10	12	1	**22***	3	13	1888
7	Kelly Tanner	6	7	31	19	3	11	4	10	18	6	**18***	9	17	12	1821
8	Tony Toste	16	2	10	9	11	15	20	8	19	9	10	8	14	23	1790
9	Scott Gaylord	14	14	24	31	5	13	7	11	15	17	7	10	6	16	1748
10	Jeff Davis	26	8	20	12	20	9	8	12	6	8	19	6	15	22	1745
11	Brandon Ash	20	29	5	16	14	19	19	**16**	17	11	20	2	21	35	1580
12	Ron Burns	DNQ	10	28	21	8	14	16	14	16	29	6	15	13	20	1574
13	Craig Raudman	9	15	8	6	6	24	10	17	26	28	21	16	18		1528
14	Eric Norris	23	DNQ	14	20	12	22	13		12	18	9	5	8	36	1441
15	Jeff Streeter	DNQ		25	24	16	16	11	13	23	15	15	21	24	19	1348
16	Blair Aiken	DNQ	23	26	22	10	3	6	15	20	26		28	19		1291
17	Pappy Pryor	18	22	16	33	19	18	17	18	30	24	14	27		34	1188
18	Wayne Jacks	12	20	29	26	24	17	18					12	23	30	997
19	Kevin Culver	21	25					21	5			13	18		28	755
20	Jerry Cain	**5**	DNQ	17	18	13	5									710
21	Bruce Bechtel	DNQ	18	DNQ			8	12						9		647
22	Lance Norick		27	27	29	15				7	DNQ				32	637
23	Nipper Alsup			13	3					27	3		23			630
24	Brendan Gaughan		19	19							**5**			20	5	625
25	Bo Lemler	17	DNQ			17	23						19		25	564
26	Kenny Smith	25	13	21									20	22	39	558
27	T. J. Clark		24		14					11			24		38	492
28	Davy Lee Liniger						12	9			23			12		486
29	Ken Schrader	2*			**1***	18										479
30	Bill McAnally	11	21	9	23											462
31	Don Abreu	24		DNQ							14		13		33	455
32	Randy Nelson		4	22	15					28						454
33	Hershel McGriff					23					32		7		9	450
34	Rich Woodland Jr.			1	17										8	434
35	Jerry Glanville		3							21	7					411
36	Mike Chase				5					5					**29**	391
37	Bob Howard	DNQ	34	DNQ		21					25					389
38	Billy Kann		26	11	25						30					376
39	Rick Scribner	DNQ	11	12												339
40	Gary Collins	3	31				25									328
41	Darrel Krentz	DNQ	12	DNQ	34											316
42	Larry Gunselman	19	28		13											309
43	L. J. Pryor											16		16		291
44	Dan Obrist								4			11				290
45	Andy Coyle											17	11		DNQ	242
46	St. James Davis		DNQ		36					32	27				DNQ	272
47	Dean Wanless									8	16					257
48	Davey Manthei	10	17													246
49	Ricky Logan				32						10				DNQ	241
50	Joe Bean									31			17		DNQ	207
51	Jay Sauter			32						9						205
52	Steve Almquist						20			22						200
53	Motohiro Nakaji			15											27	200
54	Andy Houston														1*	185
55	Jack Sellers							DNQ				22		25		185
56	Craig Rayburn	15	35													176
57	Tom Hubert														2	175
58	Sean Monroe						4									160
59	Lance Wade											4				160
60	Lance Hooper									4						160
61	Boris Said		5													155
62	Mike Dillon				7											151
63	Hank Parker Jr.														6	150
64	Sammy Potashnick	22													37	149
65	David Starr														7	146
66	Jerry Spilsbury										20				DNQ	137
67	Ron Esau				35					29						134
68	Bow Carpenter	DNQ		30												134
69	Jimmy Kitchens				10											134
70	Jason Small						DC							10		134
71	Scott Saunders										21				DNQ	131
72	Eric Ash													11		130
73	Rick Ware														14	121
74	Mark Starr									14						121
75	Jeff Ward														15	118
76	George Nordling	DNQ			DNQ											116
77	Dirk Piz			18												109
78	Bobby Gerhart														18	109
79	Hideo Fukuyama										19					106
80	Leo Hindery														21	100
81	Kazuteru Wakida										22					97
82	Keiichi Tsuchiya									24						91
83	Bobby Pangonis														24	91
84	Ron Jacks					25										88
85	Rudy Revak												25			88
86	Rod Bennett												26			85
87	Tim Buckley														26	85
88	Doc Faustina												29			76
89	Ron Hornaday Jr.				30											73
90	Ron Peterson												DNQ			70
91	Tim Steele														31	70
92	Tom Burba												DNQ			67
93	Brian Cutter										DNQ					64
94	Michael Alsup		33													64
95	Mike Snow										DNQ					58
96	John Walsh				DNQ											52
97	Glen Morgan														40	43
98	Mike Rose														DNQ	43
99	Kenneth Mosby														DNQ	28

== See also ==
- 1998 NASCAR Winston Cup Series
- 1998 NASCAR Busch Series
- 1998 NASCAR Craftsman Truck Series
- 1998 ARCA Bondo/Mar-Hyde Series
- 1998 NASCAR Goody's Dash Series
