= 2001 NASCAR Winston West Series =

48th season of the NASCAR Winston West Series

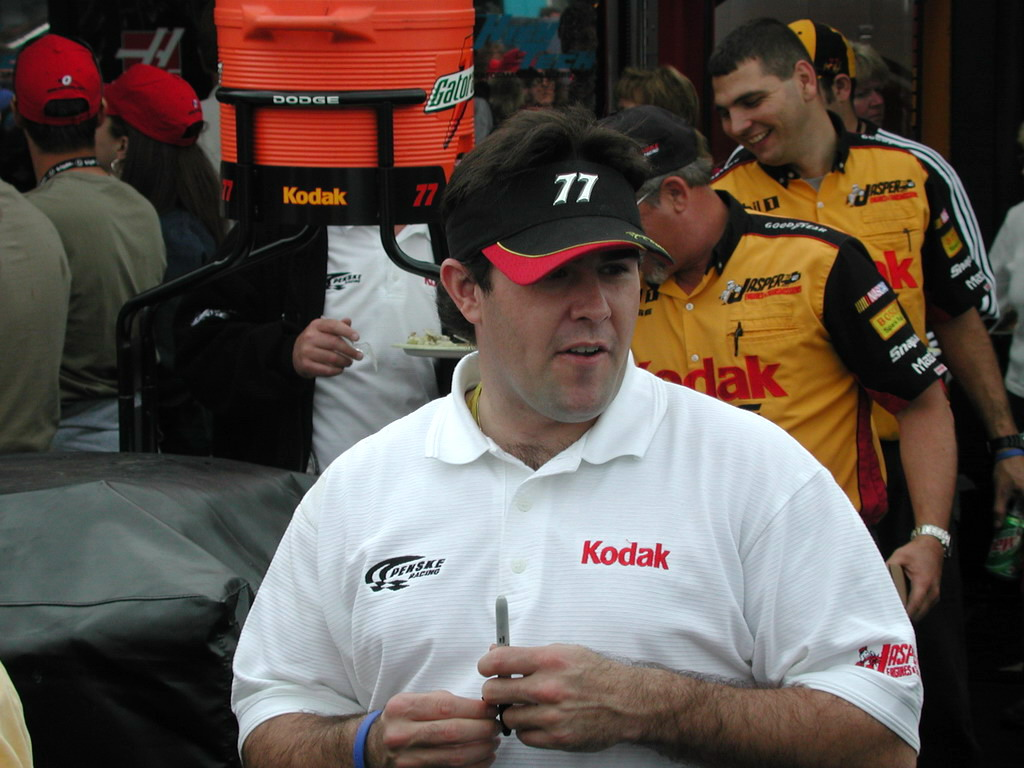
Brendan Gaughan, the 2001 West Series champion.

The 2001 NASCAR Winston West Series was the 48th season of the series. The title was won by Brendan Gaughan, his second in the series and second in a row.

== Schedule and results ==
The 2001 season included 14 individual races, although Irwindale Speedway hosted three races.

Date	Name	Racetrack	Location	Winner
February 4	NASCAR Winter Heat	Phoenix International Raceway	Avondale, Arizona	Ken Schrader
March 1	NAPA 300	The Bullring at Las Vegas Motor Speedway	Las Vegas, Nevada	Mark Reed
March 10	Tucson 250	Tucson Raceway Park	Tucson, Arizona	Johnny Borneman III
March 18	Foods Co. 200	Mesa Marin Raceway	Bakersfield, California	Steve Portenga
April 28	Pontiac Widetrack Grand Prix 200	California Speedway	Fontana, California	Brendan Gaughan
May 12	Food 4 Less 250	Irwindale Speedway	Irwindale, California	Brendan Gaughan
May 20	NASCAR Challenge Salinas 250	Mazda Raceway Laguna Seca	Monterey, California	C. T. Hellmund
June 6	Kansas 100	Kansas Speedway	Kansas City, Kansas	Frank Kimmel
June 30	Coors Light 200 Pres. by NAPA & Albertson's	Evergreen Speedway	Monroe, Washington	Brendan Gaughan
July 14	NAPA 250	Colorado National Speedway	Erie, Colorado	Steve Portenga
July 21	Food 4 Less 250	Irwindale Speedway	Irwindale, California	Brendan Gaughan
September 1	Bank One 250 Presented by NAPA and Hoosier	Rocky Mountain Raceways	West Valley City, Utah	Sammy Potashnick
October 13	The 24 Hour Fitness 250	Las Vegas Motor Speedway	Las Vegas, Nevada	Brendan Gaughan
November 10	Jani-King 250 Presented by NAPA	Irwindale Speedway	Irwindale, California	Brendan Gaughan

== Full Drivers' Championship ==
(key) Bold – Pole position awarded by time. Italics – Pole position set by owner's points. * – Most laps led.

Pos	Driver	PHO	LVS	TUS	MMR	CAL	IRW	LAG	KAN	EVG	CNS	IRW	RMR	LVS	IRW	Pts
1	Brendan Gaughan	25	8	12	3*	1	1*	4	4	1*	2	1*	16*	1	1*	2257
2	Mark Reed	**4**	**1***	9	5	**12**	**2**	5	6	2	5	6	12	3	4	2197
3	Austin Cameron	3	4	14	**2**	3	16	11	8	3	8	21	9	2	6	2048
4	Steve Portenga	6	19	18	1	4	9	8	18	13	1	5	3	26	5	1983
5	Eric Norris	2	22	11	4	11	20	2	7	16	3	9	14	8	9	1914
6	Sean Woodside	32	3	15	17	15	3	**3**	5	**10**	**6**	**3**	18	7	**16**	1914
7	Johnny Borneman III	16	7	1	13	14	7	15	16	7	13	2	6	11	25	1873
8	Scott Gaylord	10	9	10	8	13	6	6	15	20	11	7	7	6	24	1861
9	Brandon Ash	13	26	3	7	23	11	7	21	4	15	8	15	10	2	1852
10	Bill Sedgwick	8	14	13	24	20	5	13	11	5	10*	15	5	18	11	1806
11	Kevin Richards	5	5	22	26	7	4	20	24	15	7	11	2	12	26	1793
12	Sammy Potashnick	27	15	4	14	10	8	16	17	9	16	23	1	19	13	1746
13	Hershel McGriff	14	18	5	16	28	13	9	14	6	9	17	8	21	12	1731
14	Tim Woods	20	16	21	12	22	12	22	13		14	14	17	27	7	1487
15	Jack Sellers	22	DNQ	16	27	16	19	23	12	22	12	DNQ	13	14	23	1463
16	Troy Cline	18	21	7	9	18	17	17	9	19		10				1209
17	Joe Bean	9	11	17	6	27					4	22	19	25	15	1186
18	Mike Duncan	12	2	19	20	29			19						14	814
19	Ross Thompson	17	10	6	23	24	18									695
20	Mike David				19		14		10			4		5		676
21	Scott Lynch	7				17						12		15	3	673
22	Brett Thompson	24	6									13	**4**		10	664
23	Jon Wood	11				2*			**2**					**9**		628
24	Jason Small	15			21	5			20					23		570
25	Tony Schmidt	30	DNQ	2*	18	DNQ										517
26	Bobby Hillis Jr.	19			DNQ							16	10	28		507
27	Mike Grady	31			25			12						24	21	476
28	Jeff Barrister	26				21						DNQ		22	DNQ	449
29	Kazuto Saito				15		15		23						22	427
30	Matt Dillard			20				10		14						358
31	Neville Lance						10	18							18	352
32	Ken Schrader	1*				6										335
33	Davy Lee Liniger				22					12					20	327
34	Bobby Dotter	29				25									8	311
35	Dennis Hannel	23	DNQ					21								273
36	Ken Kaltschmidt		12							11						257
37	G. J. Mennen Jr.												11	13		254
38	Dan Obrist				11					18						239
39	John Metcalf	28												4		239
40	Jeff Jefferson				10					21						234
41	David Gilliland					8						24				233
42	Frank Kimmel								1*							185
43	C. T. Hellmund							1*								185
44	Mike Hamby	33				19										170
45	Andy Hillenburg								3							165
46	John Baker			**8**												147
47	Rick Carelli					9										143
48	Tom Haffer									8						142
49	Carl Harr		13													124
50	Chuck Billington							14								121
51	Auggie Vidovich													16		115
52	Shawna Robinson													17		112
53	Gary Collins		17													112
54	Travis Powell									17						112
55	Brandon Miller														17	112
56	Rick Grissom											18				109
57	Scott Riggs													20*		108
58	Todd Burns														19	106
59	Garland Self							19								106
60	Bob Lyon											19				106
61	Zan Sharp												20			103
62	Mike Walker											20				103
63	Ron Hornaday Jr.		20													103
64	Gene Christensen	21														100
65	John O'Neal Jr.								22							97
66	Michael Waltrip		23													94
67	Shawn Culp			23												94
68	Jeff Moore			24												91
69	Wayne Jacks		24													91
70	Daryl Harr		25													88
71	Stanton Barrett					26										85
72	Dan Holtz				28											79
73	Doug Bland														DNQ	79
74	Jim Smith				DNQ											76
75	Jason Bowles		DNQ													73

== See also ==
- 2001 NASCAR Winston Cup Series
- 2001 NASCAR Busch Series
- 2001 NASCAR Craftsman Truck Series
- 2001 NASCAR Goody's Dash Series
- 2001 ARCA Re/Max Series
