= 2000 NASCAR Winston West Series =

47th season of the NASCAR Winston West Series

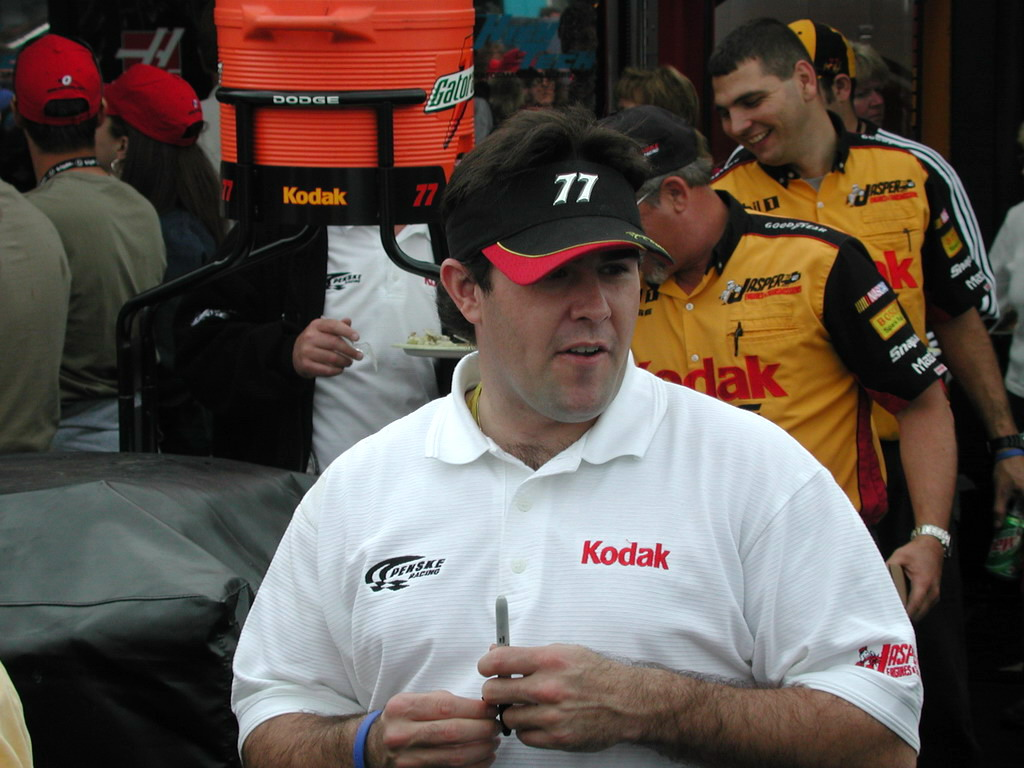
Brendan Gaughan, the 2001 West Series champion.

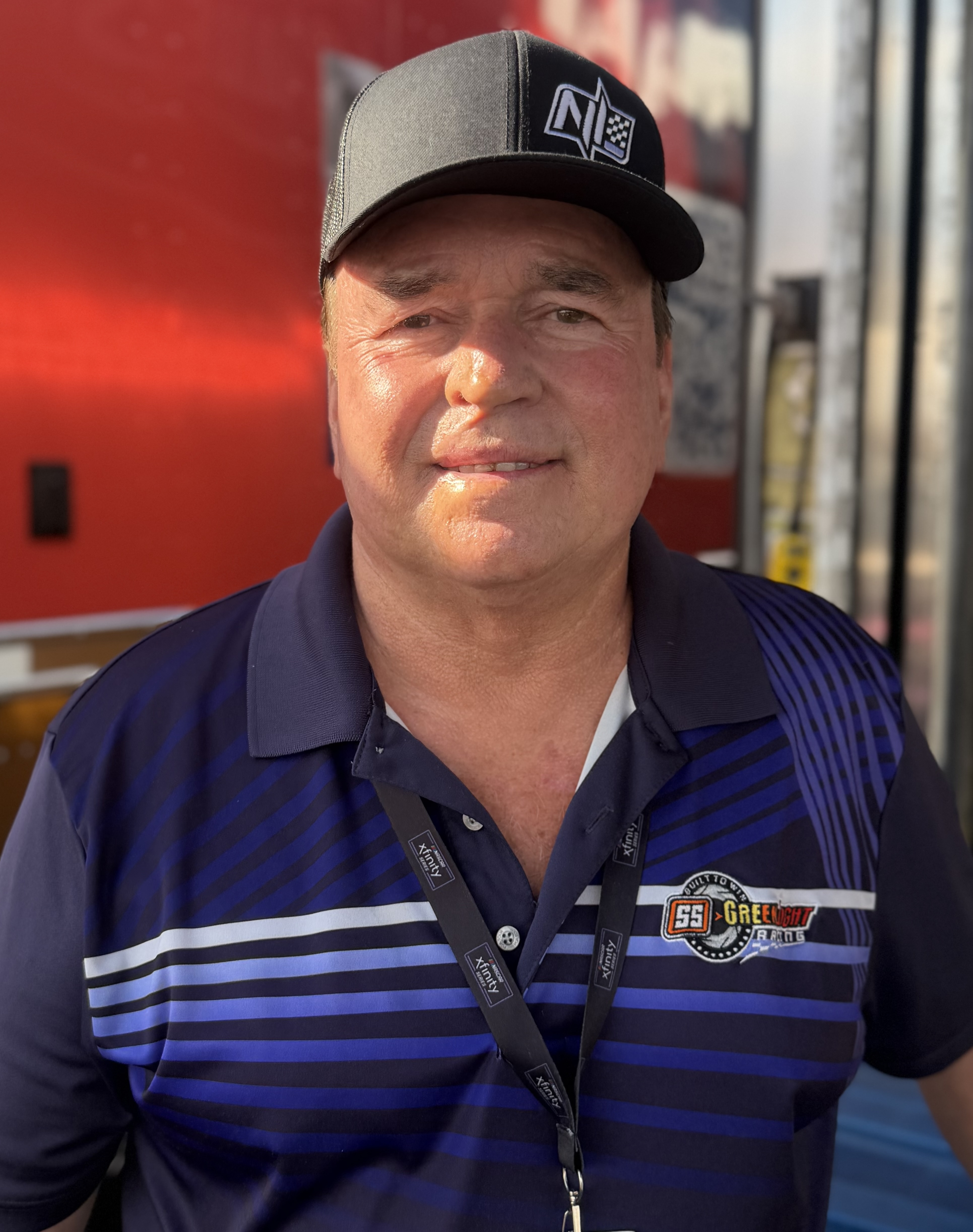
Bobby Dotter finished second in the standings.

The 2000 NASCAR Winston West Series was the 47th season of the series. The title was won by Brendan Gaughan, his first in the series.

== Schedule and results ==
The 2000 season included 12 individual races, although Mesa Marin Raceway hosted two races and Irwindale Speedway hosted three races.

Date	Name	Racetrack	Location	Winner
March 18	NAPA Auto Parts 100	Phoenix International Raceway	Avondale, Arizona	Kevin Richards
March 25	Outback Steakhouse Presents the Coors 200	Mesa Marin Raceway	Bakersfield, California	Brendan Gaughan
April 22	The Orleans 150	Las Vegas Motor Speedway	Las Vegas, Nevada	David Starr
April 29	Pontiac Widetrack Grand Prix 200	California Speedway	Fontana, California	Johnny Benson Jr.
May 21	Salinas 250	Laguna Seca Raceway	Monterey, California	Bobby Dotter
June 24	Home Depot 250	Irwindale Speedway	Irwindale, California	Bobby Dotter
July 4	NAPA Auto Parts 200	Portland Speedway	Portland, Oregon	Jeff Jefferson
July 16	Coors Light 200	Evergreen Speedway	Monroe, Washington	Brendan Gaughan
August 19	Home Depot 250	Irwindale Speedway	Irwindale, California	Joe Bean
September 4	Bank One 250	Rocky Mountain Raceways	West Valley City, Utah	Bobby Dotter
October 22	Spears Manufacturing 250	Mesa Marin Raceway	Bakersfield, California	Eric Norris
November 11	Home Depot 300	Irwindale Speedway	Irwindale, California	Bobby Dotter

== Full Drivers' Championship ==
(key) Bold – Pole position awarded by time. Italics – Pole position set by owner's points. * – Most laps led.

Pos	Driver	PHO	MMR	LVS	CAL	LAG	IRW	POR	EVG	IRW	RMR	MMR	IRW	Pts
1	Brendan Gaughan	4	1	**4***	3	9	2	3	1*	**5***	**6**	15	3	1956
2	Bobby Dotter	2	10	30	13	1	**1***	11	8	6	1*	10	1	1792
3	Steve Portenga	**20**	2	8	11	7	8	2	14	8	8	2*	11	1748
4	John Metcalf	12	6	5	14	18	7	8	4	14	13	3	4	1705
5	Kevin Richards	1*	22*	13	5	2	4	12	9	12	16	7	13	1683
6	Bill Sedgwick	6	**21**	26	15	5	6	4	6	2	2	8	23	1659
7	Eric Norris	19	23	3	4	6	12	6	15	18	11	1	12	1621
8	Mike Duncan	25	4	12	8	20	3	21	7	17	4	5	7	1604
9	Joe Bean	16	3	16	20	10	22	22	12	1	14	4	5	1579
10	Scott Gaylord	9	11	14	12	12	15	19	10	3	5	21	8	1568
11	Sammy Potashnick	3	8	24	18	25	17	24	2	24	10	23	18	1396
12	Rick Bogart	7	24	22	21	17	24	15	16	16	9	22	10	1359
13	Jeff Jefferson	27	28	25	9		20	**1***	**5**	4	19	6	25	1344
14	Troy Cline	29	13	DNQ	25	11	9	16	11	10	12	13	26	1341
15	Jason Small	5	27	9	17	23	23	9		7	22	27	14	1264
16	Jack Sellers	15	25	15	30	19	16	17	13	25	17	14	28	1254
17	Austin Cameron	22	14	2	29	**4**	21			15	3		**6**	1187
18	Gene Christensen	26	18	21	31		18	18	18	20	15	26	19	1103
19	Mike Grady	10	12	17	28	13	26			11	21	16	DNQ	1061
20	Johnny Borneman III	8		7	10	3*	14							723
21	Rod Bennett		17			16	DNQ	20		21		28	DNQ	667
22	Mark Reed		5	6	16					9			22	655
23	Travis Powell	14	19	28	DNQ				17				DNQ	543
24	Sean Woodside						10	5				9	16	542
25	Dan Obrist							7	3			24		412
26	Gary Smith	11	20	27	23									409
27	Jerry Cain	23	15	20	26									400
28	Ken Schrader			23	**2**						23			363
29	Tim Buckley									13	18		20	336
30	Dan Holcomb	18		10	24									334
31	David Starr			1	7									326
32	Brett Thompson										7	17	DNQ	325
33	Eric Holmes	24		18								25		288
34	Jerry Glanville			11	6									280
35	Jeff Barrister	17	26							DNQ				276
36	Brandon Ash	21			32						24			258
37	Greg Voigt						5			22				252
38	Davy Lee Liniger											11	15	248
39	Tony Schmidt											12	17	239
40	Kenny Smith						19			19				212
41	Charlie Solomon					22						20		200
42	Matt Crafton												2*	180
43	Wayne Jacks											19	DNQ	179
44	Greg Davis						DNQ			23				173
45	Craig Raudman				19								DNQ	158
46	Clint Mears						25						DNQ	152
47	Lance Hooper		7											151
48	Garland Self					8								142
49	Jeff Murray				27								DNQ	140
50	Scott Lynch												9	138
51	Marty Houston		9											138
52	Kevin Culver							10						134
53	Gary Collins						11							130
54	Mike Hamby	13												124
55	Butch Miller							13						124
56	Gene Woods						13							124
57	Hershel McGriff							14						121
58	Bow Carpenter					14								121
59	Rick Sutherland					15								118
60	Les Den Herder		16											115
61	Kevin Harvick											**18**		109
62	Tony Kester			19										106
63	Zan Sharp										20			103
64	Tony Hunt					21								100
65	David Gilliland												21	100
66	Dwayne Leik				22									97
67	Gary Morris							23						94
68	A. J. Alsup					24								91
69	Jeff Davis												24	91
70	L. J. Pryor									26				85
71	Tim Woods												27	82
72	Jerry Kobza									DNQ				82
73	Scott Busby	28												79
74	Johnny Benson Jr.				1*									77
75	Dan Holtz											DNQ		76
76	Rich DeLong Jr.			29										76
77	Michael Walker												DNQ	70

== See also ==
- 2000 NASCAR Winston Cup Series
- 2000 NASCAR Busch Series
- 2000 NASCAR Craftsman Truck Series
- 2000 NASCAR Goody's Dash Series
- 2000 ARCA Bondo/Mar-Hyde Series
