= 1999 The Orleans 150 =

2nd race of the 1999 NASCAR Winston West Series

Race details
- Race 2 of 14 in the 1999 NASCAR Winston West Series season
- Date: March 5, 1999
- Location: Las Vegas Motor Speedway in Las Vegas, Nevada
- Course: Permanent racing facility
- Course length: 1.500 miles (2.414 km)
- Distance: 100 laps, 150.00 mi (241.402 km)
- Average speed: 104.368 miles per hour (167.964 km/h)

Pole position
Driver	Jerry Nadeau	Melling Racing

Most laps led
Driver	Jerry Nadeau	Melling Racing
- Laps: 79

Winner
No. 9	Jerry Nadeau	Melling Racing

The 1999 The Orleans 150 was the second stock car race of the 1999 NASCAR Winston West Series and the sixth iteration of the event. The race was held on Friday, March 5, 1999, at Las Vegas Motor Speedway, a 1.500 mi (2.414 km) tri-oval shaped racetrack in Las Vegas, Nevada. The race took the scheduled 100 laps to complete. The race was won by Jerry Nadeau, his first win in his first and only career NASCAR Winston West Series start. Nadeau won the race from the pole, leading most of the race, having only dropped back when a flat tire caused him to make an unscheduled pit stop. Ron Hornaday Jr. finished second in the race, followed by Bobby Hamilton Jr., also making his first and only career start in the series. Sammy Potashnick finished in fourth and Austin Cameron rounded out the top five.

== Report ==
=== Background ===
Las Vegas Motor Speedway is a 1.500 mi (2.414 km) tri-oval intermediate speedway in Las Vegas, Nevada. The track complex has hosted various major racing events since its opening, including NASCAR, IndyCar, and Champ Car. The track's complex features various adjacent tracks, including a 0.375 mi (0.604 km) oval, a 0.500 mi (0.805 km) clay oval, and a road course with multiple layouts. The main track also features an infield road course that is used for sports car racing.

==== Entry list ====
#	Driver	Owner	Manufacturer
00	Scott Gaylord	Geoff Burney	Chevrolet
1	Butch Gilliland	Richard Hilton	Ford
02	Bob Howard	Bob Howard	Chevrolet
3	Steve Portenga	James Offenbach	Chevrolet
4	Scott Busby	Scott Busby	Chevrolet
04	Kurt Busch	Charlene Spilsbury	Ford
5	Ron Burns	Ron Burns	Ford
05	John Metcalf	Randy Morse	Chevrolet
6	Gary Smith	Doc Faustina	Pontiac
9	Jerry Nadeau	Harry Melling	Ford
09	Doc Faustina	Dick Midgley	Chevrolet
10	Tony Toste	Daniel Toste	Chevrolet
12	Austin Cameron	Terry Cameron	Chevrolet
13	Dean Kuhn	Dan Chittenden	Chevrolet
14	Jason Small	Ken Small	Chevrolet
16	Sean Woodside	Bill McAnally	Chevrolet
18	Mike Chase	Gene Christensen	Chevrolet
19	Billy Kann	Billy Kann	Chevrolet
20	Brendan Gaughan	Walker Evans	Chevrolet
23	Brandon Ash	Ed Ash	Ford
24	Jeff Marmack	Art Rios	Chevrolet
29	Bow Carpenter	Bow Carpenter	Chevrolet
32	Eric Norris	Matt Stowe	Ford
33	Darrel Krentz	Robert Wood	Ford
34	T. J. Clark	Roy Huartson	Chevrolet
35	David Starr	Mike Starr	Chevrolet
43	Kenny Smith	Kenny Smith	Chevrolet
44	Bill Sedgwick	Tim Buckley	Chevrolet
46	Rob Morgan	David Dollar	Ford
49	Mike Dillard	Mike Dillard	Ford
51	Rick Ware	Rick Ware	Pontiac
53	Ron Hornaday Jr.	Bernie Hilber	Pontiac
56	Bobby Dotter	Sammy Potashnick	Ford
57	Rick Carelli	Marshall Chesrown	Chevrolet
58	Ricky Craven	Scott Barbour	Ford
59	Bobby Hamilton Jr.	Earl Sadler	Chevrolet
65	Sammy Potashnick	Sammy Potashnick	Chevrolet
66	Billy Turner	Sheri Turner	Chevrolet
67	Mike Duncan	Mike Duncan	Ford
71	Jerry Cain	Jerry Cain	Chevrolet
77	Joe Bean	Joe Nava	Ford
81	Jerry Glanville	Jerry Glanville	Ford
85	Kevin Richards	Gene Monaco	Chevrolet
96	Bobby Pangonis	Darcy Pangonis	Chevrolet
98	Kevin Culver	Richard Kieper	Chevrolet
	Jeff Ward	Unknown	Unknown

== Qualifying ==
Jerry Nadeau won the pole with a speed of 166.246 mph, over one mph faster than second place. Ten drivers failed to qualify, those being Jeff Ward, Bob Howard, Dean Kuhn, Billy Kann, Jeff Marmack, Bow Carpenter, Darrel Krentz, T. J. Clark, Bill Sedgwick, and Mike Dillard.

== Race results ==
Fin	St	#	Driver	Owner	Make	Laps	Led	Status	Pts
1	1	9	Jerry Nadeau	Harry Melling	Ford	100	79	Running	185
2	30	53	Ron Hornaday Jr.	Bernie Hilber	Pontiac	100	0	Running	170
3	4	59	Bobby Hamilton Jr.	Earl Sadler	Chevrolet	100	9	Running	170
4	12	65	Sammy Potashnick	Sammy Potashnick	Chevrolet	100	0	Running	160
5	7	12	Austin Cameron	Terry Cameron	Chevrolet	100	7	Running	160
6	19	18	Mike Chase	Gene Christensen	Chevrolet	100	0	Running	150
7	8	14	Jason Small	Ken Small	Chevrolet	100	0	Running	146
8	11	04	Kurt Busch	Charlene Spilsbury	Ford	100	2	Running	147
9	36	23	Brandon Ash	Ed Ash	Ford	100	0	Running	138
10	32	85	Kevin Richards	Gene Monaco	Chevrolet	100	0	Running	134
11	13	71	Jerry Cain	Jerry Cain	Chevrolet	100	0	Running	130
12	24	32	Eric Norris	Matt Stowe	Ford	99	0	Running	127
13	9	77	Joe Bean	Joe Nava	Ford	99	0	Running	124
14	15	66	Billy Turner	Sheri Turner	Chevrolet	99	0	Running	121
15	14	16	Sean Woodside	Bill McAnally	Chevrolet	99	0	Running	118
16	25	57	Rick Carelli	Mashall Chesrown	Chevrolet	98	0	Running	115
17	34	6	Gary Smith	Doc Faustina	Pontiac	98	0	Running	112
18	21	81	Jerry Glanville	Jerry Glanville	Ford	98	0	Running	109
19	31	5	Ron Burns	Ron Burns	Ford	98	0	Running	106
20	26	3	Steve Portenga	James Offenbach	Chevrolet	95	0	Running	103
21	18	98	Kevin Culver	Richard Kieper	Chevrolet	93	0	Running	100
22	10	51	Rick Ware	Rick Ware	Pontiac	86	0	Running	97
23	2	58	Ricky Craven	Scott Barbour	Ford	81	3	Engine	99
24	27	4	Scott Busby	Scott Busby	Chevrolet	79	0	Accident	91
25	6	20	Brendan Gaughan	Walker Evans	Chevrolet	79	0	Accident	88
26	17	67	Mike Duncan	Mike Duncan	Ford	79	0	Accident	85
27	3	10	Tony Toste	Daniel Toste	Chevrolet	79	0	Accident	82
28	22	56	Bobby Dotter	Sammy Potashnick	Ford	59	0	Engine	79
29	5	1	Butch Gilliland	Richard Hilton	Ford	42	0	Accident	76
30	16	43	Kenny Smith	Kenny Smith	Chevrolet	31	0	Accident	73
31	35	09	Doc Faustina	Dick Midgley	Chevrolet	31	0	Accident	70
32	29	35	David Starr	Mike Starr	Chevrolet	25	0	Handling	67
33	28	46	Rob Morgan	David Dollar	Ford	21	0	Engine	64
34	18	96	Bobby Pangonis	Darcy Pangonis	Chevrolet	9	0	Accident	61
35	20	05	John Metcalf	Randy Morse	Chevrolet	9	0	Accident	58
36	33	00	Scott Gaylord	Scott Gaylord	Pontiac	3	0	Vibration	55

== Standings after the race ==
	Pos	Driver	Points
2	1	Brandon Ash	308
4	2	Mike Chase	300 (–8)
2	3	Sean Woodside	298 (–10)
6	4	Sammy Potashnick	294 (–14)
9	5	Austin Cameron	281 (–27)
2	6	Rick Carelli	280 (–28)
8	7	Jason Small	266 (–42)
1	8	Joe Bean	262 (–46)
4	9	Kevin Richards	258 (–50)
9	10	Eric Norris	233 (–75)

- Note: Only the first 10 positions are included for the driver standings.

Previous race: 1999 Winston West 200	NASCAR Winston West Series; 1999 season	Next race: 1999 NAPA Auto Parts 100
