= 2003 NASCAR Winston West Series =

50th season of the NASCAR Winston West Series

The 2003 NASCAR Winston West Series was the 50th season of the series and the final sponsored by Winston. The title was won by Scott Lynch, his first in the series.

== Schedule and results ==
The 2003 season included 12 individual races, although Phoenix International Raceway hosted two races. A thirteenth and final race, scheduled to run at California Speedway, was canceled due to the 2003 California wildfires.

Date	Name	Racetrack	Location	Winner
February 2	Bosch Spark Plug 150	Phoenix International Raceway	Avondale, Arizona	Ken Schrader
April 12	Orleans 222	The Bullring at Las Vegas Motor Speedway	Las Vegas, Nevada	Jim Inglebright
April 26	Pontiac Widetrack Grand Prix 200	California Speedway	Fontana, California	Steve Portenga
May 31	NAPA 150 by NAPA Belts & Hose/Madera Auto Ctr	Madera Speedway	Madera, California	Mike Duncan
June 21	NAPA 150	Tri-City Raceway	West Richland, Washington	Jason Jefferson
June 28	Coors Light 200 Presented by NAPA	Evergreen Speedway	Monroe, Washington	Mark Reed
July 26	King Taco 200	Irwindale Speedway	Irwindale, California	Scott Lynch
August 16	NAPA 200 Dodge Country Presented by Havoline	Stockton 99 Speedway	Stockton, California	Austin Cameron
August 30	NAPA 200 Presented by Coca Cola	Rocky Mountain Raceways	West Valley City, Utah	Scott Lynch
September 20	NAPA 200 Presented by NAPA Belts & Hose	Douglas County Speedway	Roseburg, Oregon	Austin Cameron
October 5	Subway 150	Phoenix International Raceway	Avondale, Arizona	Scott Lynch
October 19	Lucas Oil 150	Mesa Marin Raceway	Bakersfield, California	Mike Duncan

== Full Drivers' Championship ==
(key) Bold – Pole position awarded by time. Italics – Pole position set by owner's points. * – Most laps led.

Pos	Driver	PHO	LVS	CAL	MAD	TCR	EVG	IRW	S99	RMR	DCS	PHO	MMR	Pts
1	Scott Lynch	**2**	9	13	4	11	6	**1***	9	1	3	**1**	4	1890
2	Mike Duncan	20	6	8	**1***	7	2	6	6	6	2	3	**1***	1876
3	Steve Portenga	5	4	1	6	10	9	7	2	4	10	2	6	1857
4	Kevin Richards	6	15	3	19	**2***	**14**	2	8	15	6	4*	10	1734
5	Scott Gaylord	9	7	12	9	3	3	4	10	5*	20	6	8	1733
6	Jim Inglebright	3	**1***	15	8	9	11	22	15	10	4	5	11	1672
7	Mark Reed		3	6	7	4	1*	10	7	3	14	14	2	1663
8	Johnny Borneman III	11	13	**4**	3	13	7	13	5	16	19	9	5	1657
9	Brett Thompson	13	8	10	17	12	8	5	4	8	13	10	9	1458
10	Gene Woods	15	5	24	10	15	22	11	12	11	5	22	19	1458
11	Jack Sellers	16	12	18	13	16	20	18	17	17	17	21	26	1323
12	Bobby Hillis Jr.	26	20	26	14	17	17	21	14	19	16	19	22	1263
13	Jeff Davis	22	23	27	15	18	16	16	20	14	18	20	24	1257
14	David Eshleman	14	14	19	18	14	21	19		18	15	DNQ	18	1214
15	Austin Cameron	4	17					20	**1***	**9**	**1***	7	3	1199
16	Tim Woods			20				8	16	7	8	13	25	860
17	Mike David			21	2			3	3		21	8		852
18	Daryl Harr	21	11	17			13			12		15		711
19	Carl Harr	19	18	23			15			20		16		650
20	C. T. Hellmund	7	2		11					2				621
21	Brandon Miller	27		11				9					7	501
22	Jason Jefferson					1	5					11		465
23	Ed Watson					8	10	12						403
24	Takuma Koga	28	19					17					21	397
25	Ken Schrader	1*		2*										365
26	Steve Schaefer										12	17	17	351
27	Troy Shirk		21		12				19					333
28	Jeff Jefferson						5	4						315
29	Dan Obrist						12				9			265
30	Kevin Culver										7		15	264
31	Scott Schmidt	12	10											261
32	Rocky Nash							14				12		248
33	Nick DeFazio							15					14	239
34	Jason Small						19						13	230
35	Matt Kobyluck	23	16											209
36	Kenny Shepherd								21				20	203
37	Ken Weaver	24		22										188
38	Bryan Herta			5										155
39	Eric Holmes				5									155
40	Brandon Riehl					6								150
41	Eric Norris			7										146
42	Jimmy Kitchens	8												142
43	Frank Deiny Jr.			9										138
44	Clint Vahsholtz	10												134
45	Dirk Kruiswyk										11			130
46	John Moore								11					130
47	Brian Richardson												12	127
48	Ron Strmiska Jr.								13					124
49	Lynn Hardy									13				124
50	Rick Bogart			14										121
51	Brandon Whitt			16										120
52	John Krebs				16									115
53	Tim Smith												16	115
54	Paul Wolfe	17												112
55	Wayne Jacks	18												109
56	Tom Moriarity						18							109
57	Freddy Tame											18		109
58	Buzz DeVore								18					109
59	Doug Ingraham		22											97
60	Todd Burns							23						94
61	John Borneman						23							94
62	Tony Gomez												23	94
63	Jeff Barrister	25												88
64	G. J. Mennen Jr.			25										88
65	Mike Harmon			28										79

== See also ==
- 2003 NASCAR Winston Cup Series
- 2003 NASCAR Busch Series
- 2003 NASCAR Craftsman Truck Series
- 2003 NASCAR Goody's Dash Series
- 2003 ARCA Re/Max Series
