= 1999 Irwindale 250 presented by Jan's Towing =

7th race of the 1999 NASCAR Winston West Series

Race details
- Race 7 of 14 in the 1999 NASCAR Winston West Series season
- Date: June 19, 1999
- Location: Irwindale Speedway in Bakersfield, California
- Course: Permanent racing facility
- Course length: 0.500 miles (0.804 km)
- Distance: 250 laps, 125.00 mi (201.17 km)
- Average speed: 69.93 miles per hour (112.54 km/h)
- Attendance: 6,237

Pole position
Driver	Butch Gilliland	Hilton Racing

Most laps led
Driver	Steve Portenga	Golden Gate Racing
- Laps: 81

Winner
No. 3	Steve Portenga	Golden Gate Racing

The 1999 Irwindale 250 presented by Jan's Towing was the seventh stock car race of the 1999 NASCAR Winston West Series season and the first iteration of the event. The race was held on Saturday, June 19, 1999, at Irwindale Speedway, a 0.500 mile (0.804 km) oval shaped racetrack in Bakersfield, California. The race took the scheduled 250 laps to complete. The race was won by Steve Portenga, his first win of the season and the first of his career. With 16 laps remaining, NASCAR Craftsman Truck Series drivers Ron Hornaday Jr. and Mike Wallace led the race, but the race was slowed by Wallace crashing, and after pit stops, Bill Sedgwick and Portenga battled for the lead, with Portenga passing Sedgwick in the first turn on the final lap. Sedgwick finished second, followed by Butch Gilliland in third, Hornaday in fourth, and Wallace, despite the crash, remained on the lead lap in fifth.

== Report ==
=== Background ===
The Irwindale Speedway & Event Center (informally "The House of Drift") was a motorsports facility in Irwindale, California, United States. It operated from 1999 to 2024 with banked, paved ^{1}/_{2}- and ^{1}/_{3}-mile oval tracks and a ^{1}/_{8}-mile drag strip. It held West Series races from 1999 to 2011, 2014 to 2017, and finally from 2019 up until its closure in 2024.

==== Entry list ====
#	Driver	Owner	Manufacturer
01	Jeff Murray	Jeff Murray	Chevrolet
1	Butch Gilliland	Richard Hilton	Ford
3	Steve Portenga	James Offenbach	Chevrolet
04	Kurt Busch	Charlene Spilsbury	Ford
05	John Metcalf	Randy Morse	Chevrolet
6	Wayne Jacks	Doc Faustina	Ford
7	Ron Hornaday Jr.	Bernie Hilber	Pontiac
12	Austin Cameron	Terry Cameron	Chevrolet
13	Dean Kuhn	Dan Chittenden	Chevrolet
14	Jason Small	Ken Small	Chevrolet
16	Sean Woodside	Bill McAnally	Chevrolet
18	Mike Chase	Gene Christensen	Chevrolet
20	Brendan Gaughan	Walker Evans	Chevrolet
23	Brandon Ash	Ed Ash	Ford
26	Mike Wallace	Jim Smith	Ford
32	Eric Norris	Matt Stowe	Ford
43	Kenny Smith	Kenny Smith	Chevrolet
44	Bill Sedgwick	Tim Buckley	Chevrolet
51	Rick Ware	Rick Ware	Pontiac
53	Jeff Barrister	Unknown	Ford
57	Davy Lee Liniger	Marshall Chesrown	Chevrolet
61	Doc Faustina	Doc Faustina	Chevrolet
65	Sammy Potashnick	Sammy Potashnick	Chevrolet
71	Jerry Cain	Jerry Cain	Chevrolet
77	Joe Bean	Joe Nava	Ford
85	Kevin Richards	Gene Monaco	Chevrolet
96	Bobby Pangonis	Darcy Pangonis	Chevrolet
98	Kevin Culver	Richard Kieper	Chevrolet

== Qualifying ==
Butch Gilliland won the pole with a speed of 100.722 mph.

== Race results ==
Fin	St	#	Driver	Owner	Make	Laps	Led	Status	Pts
1	3	3	Steve Portenga	James Offenbach	Chevrolet	250	81	Running	185
2	2	44	Bill Sedgwick	Tim Buckley	Chevrolet	250	36	Running	175
3	1	1	Butch Gilliland	Richard Hilton	Ford	250	7	Running	170
4	14	7	Ron Hornaday Jr.	Bernie Hilber	Pontiac	250	42	Running	165
5	21	26	Mike Wallace	Jim Smith	Ford	250	16	Running	160
6	5	14	Jason Small	Ken Small	Chevrolet	249	0	Running	150
7	6	23	Brandon Ash	Ed Ash	Ford	249	0	Running	146
8	11	65	Sammy Potashnick	Sammy Potashnick	Chevrolet	248	0	Running	142
9	9	85	Kevin Richards	Gene Monaco	Chevrolet	247	14	Engine	143
10	22	32	Eric Norris	Matt Stowe	Ford	247	0	Running	134
11	8	13	Dean Kuhn	Dan Chittenden	Chevrolet	247	0	Running	130
12	10	05	John Metcalf	Randy Morse	Chevrolet	246	17	Running	132
13	13	16	Sean Woodside	Bill McAnally	Chevrolet	245	0	Running	124
14	20	51	Rick Ware	Rick Ware	Pontiac	244	0	Running	121
15	25	20	Brendan Gaughan	Walker Evans	Chevrolet	242	0	Running	118
16	17	01	Jeff Murray	Jeff Murray	Chevrolet	236	0	Running	115
17	28	61	Doc Faustina	Doc Faustina	Chevrolet	233	0	Running	112
18	16	18	Mike Chase	Gene Christensen	Chevrolet	220	5	Electrical	114
19	19	43	Kenny Smith	Kenny Smith	Chevrolet	204	0	Running	106
20	24	57	Davy Lee Liniger	Marshall Chesrown	Chevrolet	189	0	Running	103
21	18	77	Joe Bean	Joe Nava	Ford	134	0	Accident	105
22	4	04	Kurt Busch	Charlene Spilsbury	Ford	116	0	Engine	97
23	23	12	Austin Cameron	Terry Cameron	Chevrolet	109	0	Accident	94
24	12	6	Wayne Jacks	Doc Faustina	Ford	105	0	Engine	91
25	27	53	Jeff Barrister	Unknown	Ford	58	0	Transmission	88
26	26	96	Bobby Pangonis	Darcy Pangonis	Chevrolet	45	0	Accident	85
27	15	98	Kevin Culver	Richard Kieper	Chevrolet	27	0	Engine	82
28	7	71	Jerry Cain	Jerry Cain	Chevrolet	5	0	Engine	79

== Standings after the race ==
	Pos	Driver	Points
2	1	Brandon Ash	1026
	2	Sean Woodside	1004 (–22)
2	3	Steve Portenga	1001 (–25)
3	4	Mike Chase	1000 (–26)
1	5	Austin Cameron	951 (–75)
2	6	Butch Gilliland	922 (–104)
	7	Eric Norris	915 (–111)
2	8	Joe Bean	900 (–126)
	9	Sammy Potashnick	873 (–153)
	10	Jason Small	865 (–161)

- Note: Only the first 10 positions are included for the driver standings.

Previous race: 1999 Forum Marketing 200	NASCAR Winston West Series; 1999 season	Next race: 1999 Coors Light 200 Pres. by Albertson's
