= Jeff Davis (racing driver) =

American racing driver (born 1959)

- Nationality: American
- Born: January 29, 1959 (age 67) Carmel, Indiana, U.S.

NASCAR West Series
- Years active: 1992–1994, 1997–1998, 2000, 2002–2005
- Teams: Jeff Davis Racing
- Starts: 56
- Wins: 0
- Poles: 0
- Best finish: 4th in 1994

Previous series
- 1996 1996 1993 1991 1991: NASCAR Northwest Series; NASCAR Southwest Series; ARCA Hooters SuperCar Series; Indy Lights; International Motor Sports Association

Championship titles
- 1990: SCCA Formula Mazda

NASCAR Cup Series career
- 3 races run over 3 years
- Best finish: 66th (1997)
- First race: 1992 Pyroil 500K (Phoenix)
- Last race: 1997 Save Mart Supermarkets 300 (Sears Point)
Wins	Top tens	Poles
0	0	0

Jeff Davis (born January 29, 1959) is an American entrepreneur and former professional stock car racing driver. He primarily competed in the NASCAR West Series during the 1990s and early 2000s, but also ran in the NASCAR Winston Cup Series, open-wheel racing series like Indy Lights, and sports car racing as part of the Sports Car Club of America.

== Racing career ==
Growing up after being born in Indianapolis, Davis began racing go karts before moving to California to buy the Van-K Wheels company, the premiere kart racing wheels manufacturer and one of only three companies in the United States to make wheels for kart racing. In 1985 and 1986, he competed in Formula Ford, followed by Formula Super Vee in 1988. At the end of 1989, he purchased a Formula Mazda car and prepared to run for the series' championship in 1990. He did that, while also winning Rookie of the Year. He won the Formula Mazda championship the following year.

In 1991, Davis contested the full Indy Lights schedule running on a tight budget that had him basically running an old worn out car with a proven team as a field filler entry since the series wanted more cars in the races. He finished tenth in points after taking the checkered flag in every race except for the season openers at Long Beach & Phoenix that he'd missed by starting after they'd already been run. Although all Indy Lights drivers drove spec Buicks, Davis had little financial support, receiving it from "people who were stretching their budgets just to be there." Davis could never get the Indy Lights car to handle since it had a really loose, worn-out tub and suspension tuning failed to make much difference.

During the 1991 racing season, Davis also participated in sports car racing. In February, he ran the 24 Hours of Daytona, driving a Spice Engineering Chevrolet for Tom Milner Racing in place of Paul Newman who had paid to run that race but couldn't show up in time for practice, something that was required by IMSA. The team retired with engine problems after 448 laps and finished 14th overall, sixth in the GTP class. Other sports car starts included racing in the Trans-Am Series, winning a race at Portland International Raceway.

=== Stock car racing ===
In 1992, Davis made his NASCAR Winston West Series debut at El Cajon Speedway, finishing ninth. Later in the year, he competed in the Pyroil 500K at Phoenix International Raceway in a NASCAR Winston Cup Series/Winston West companion race, driving a Ford from Roush Racing. He qualified 39th in the 42-car grid, with various Winston West cars being sent home after qualifying too slowly. Davis, who had no experience with races that featured multiple pit stops and restarts, finished 26th; he was the second-placed West Series driver in the race behind John Krebs (23rd).

The following season, in what he called his "first really disappointing year in auto racing", he attempted to run five Cup races, but the series' competitiveness made "a quantum leap from one year to the next" and he only qualified once (Sears Point Raceway, where he finished 42nd). During the year, he also ran two ARCA Hooters SuperCar Series races at Texas World Speedway and Atlanta Motor Speedway; he finished 23rd and 21st after suspension failure and a crash, respectively.

Davis ran the full 1994 Winston West schedule, recording nine top tens and a best finish of fourth at Tri-City Raceway as he finished fourth in the standings. In August, he and thirteen other West drivers attempted to qualify for the Cup Series' inaugural Brickyard 400, a race that saw a NASCAR-record 86-driver entry list. In the first round of qualifying, he recorded a speed of 161.955 miles per hour (260.641 km/h) (60th), which he improved upon in the second round at 165.329 mph (266.071 km/h) (57th), but he ultimately failed to make the race; the other West drivers were also unable to qualify on speed, with points leader Mike Chase being guaranteed a position on a provisional.

In 1997, Davis returned to the Cup Series at Sears Point, driving the No. 9 Ford for Melling Racing. Although he competed under Melling's banner, Davis owned the car and equipment used in the race; the team, plagued by sponsorship issues, had skipped the race to save money, and all points earned by Davis went to Melling in the owner's championship. He finished 37th after being involved in a wreck with John Andretti on lap 64. Two years later, he joined Zali Racing's No. 92 for the 1999 Las Vegas 400; after being the 50th-fastest driver in the first round of qualifying, he was replaced by Morgan Shepherd for the second round. A similar driver change occurred later in the year at the Brickyard 400, when Davis qualified the No. 62 of Fenley-Moore Motorsports in round one (54th) before Lance Hooper took over the car.

After the 1997 and 1998 Cup seasons, Davis entered the series' exhibition races in Japan at Suzuka Circuit and Twin Ring Motegi, respectively. In the former's NASCAR Thunder Special Suzuka, he was one of nine Winston West drivers to compete as he finished 26th. Motegi's Coca-Cola 500 featured ten entrants from the West Series including Davis, who also fielded a car for Japanese driver Hideo Fukuyama. Davis and Fukuyama finished fourteenth and seventeenth, respectively.

Davis competed in the West Series until 2005, with his final start being a twentieth-place finish at Stockton 99 Raceway. In 56 career races, he has seventeen top-tens.

== Personal life ==
Davis was born in and grew up in Indianapolis, Indiana and graduated from North Central High School, followed by earning his business management degree at Indiana University – Purdue University Indianapolis.

Near the end of his high school years, he started a landscaping company that he incorporated and named Lawnicure Inc., which he ran through his college years along with plowing snowy driveways and small parking lots in the winters. After selling Lawnicure in 1984, he saw an opportunity to buy Van-K Engineering in southern California while on a trip to help a friend race in a support race at the Long Beach Grand Prix. Van-K Engineering is a go-kart wheel manufacturing business that was started a few years earlier by Mike VanKralingen. Davis then moved with his wife across the country to start a new life on the west coast. His Van-K business sponsored him throughout his racing career, and he owned the company until he sold it to Circle Wheels in 2000 and he worked for them for a year to help them grow into the country's go-kart racing wheel market. Van-K Wheels is the leading manufacturer in the US for the racing kart industry and sells through dealers and distributors and to chassis building companies.

== Motorsports career results ==
=== NASCAR ===
(key) (Bold – Pole position awarded by qualifying time. Italics – Pole position earned by points standings or practice time. * – Most laps led.)

==== Winston Cup Series ====
NASCAR Winston Cup Series results
Year	Team	No.	Make	1	2	3	4	5	6	7	8	9	10	11	12	13	14	15	16	17	18	19	20	21	22	23	24	25	26	27	28	29	30	31	32	33	34	NWCC	Pts	Ref
1992	Jeff Davis Racing	44	Ford	DAY	CAR	RCH	ATL	DAR	BRI	NWS	MAR	TAL	CLT	DOV	SON	POC	MCH	DAY	POC	TAL	GLN	MCH	BRI	DAR	RCH	DOV	MAR	NWS	CLT	CAR	PHO; 26	ATL						76th	85	
1993	Jeff Davis Racing	81	Ford	DAY	CAR	RCH	ATL	DAR	BRI	NWS	MAR	TAL	SON; 42	CLT	DOV	POC	MCH; DNQ	DAY	NHA	POC	TAL	GLN; DNQ	MCH; DNQ	BRI	DAR	RCH	DOV	MAR	NWS	CLT	CAR	PHO; DNQ	ATL					93rd	37	
1994	Jeff Davis Racing	81W	Ford	DAY	CAR	RCH	ATL	DAR	BRI	NWS	MAR	TAL	SON; DNQ	CLT	DOV	POC	MCH	DAY	NHA	POC	TAL	IND; DNQ	GLN	MCH	BRI	DAR	RCH	DOV	MAR	NWS	CLT	CAR	PHO; DNQ	ATL				NA	-	
1997	Melling Racing	9	Ford	DAY	CAR	RCH	ATL	DAR	TEX	BRI	MAR	SON; 37	TAL	CLT	DOV	POC	MCH	CAL	DAY	NHA	POC	IND	GLN	MCH	BRI	DAR	RCH	NHA	DOV	MAR	CLT	TAL	CAR	PHO	ATL			66th	52	
1999	Zali Racing	92	Ford	DAY	CAR	LVS; DNQ	ATL	DAR	TEX	BRI	MAR	TAL	CAL	RCH	CLT	DOV	MCH	POC	SON	DAY	NHA	POC																NA	-	
1999	Fenley-Moore Motorsports	62	Ford																				IND; QL^{†}	GLN	MCH	BRI	DAR	RCH	NHA	DOV	MAR	CLT	TAL	CAR	PHO	HOM	ATL	NA	-	
^{†} – Replaced by Lance Hooper for second round qualifying.

==== West Series ====
NASCAR West Series results
Year	Team	No.	Make	1	2	3	4	5	6	7	8	9	10	11	12	13	14	NWSC	Pts	Ref
1992	Sellers Racing	99	Pontiac	MMR	SGS	SON	SHA	POR	EVG	SSS	CAJ; 9	TWS	MMR					23rd	303	
1992	Jeff Davis Racing	44	Ford											PHO; 26				23rd	303	
1993	Jeff Davis Racing	81	Ford	TWS; 23	MMR	SGS	SON; 42	TUS	SHA	EVG	POR	CBS	SSS	CAJ	TCR	MMR	PHO; DNQ	27th	430	
1994	Jeff Davis Racing	81	Chevy	MMR; 23	TUS; 6							CAJ; 8	TCR; 4	LVS; 6	MMR; 5			4th	1958	
1994	Jeff Davis Racing	81	Ford			SON; DNQ	SGS; 5	YAK; 7	MMR; 12	POR; 5	IND; DNQ					PHO; DNQ	TUS; 5	4th	1958	
1997	Jeff Davis Racing	81	Ford	TUS	AMP	SON	TUS	MMR	LVS; 9	CAL; 17	EVG	POR	PPR	AMP				16th	683	
1997	Jeff Davis Racing	4	Ford												SON; 15	MMR; 16	LVS; 15	16th	683	
1998	Jeff Davis Racing	4	Ford	TUS; 26	LVS; 8	PHO; 20	CAL; 12	HPT; 20	MMR; 9	AMP; 8	POR; 12	CAL; 6	PPR; 8	EVG; 19	SON; 6	MMR; 15	LVS; 22	10th	1745	
2000		76	Ford	PHO	MMR	LVS	CAL	LAG	IRW	POR	EVG	IRW	RMR	MMR	IRW; 24			69th	91	
2002	Sellers Racing	1	Chevy	PHO	LVS	CAL; 19	KAN					DCS; 15	LVS; 20					19th	563	
2002	Christina Adair	3	Pontiac					EVG; 17	IRW; 13	S99	RMR							19th	563	
2003	KC Racing	1	Pontiac	PHO; 22		CAL; 27												13th	1214	
2003	KC Racing	1	Chevy		LVS; 23		MAD; 15	TCR; 18	EVG; 16	IRW; 16	S99; 20	RMR; 14	DCS; 18	PHO; 20				13th	1214	
2003	Sellers Racing	15	Chevy												MMR; 24			13th	1214	
2004	KC Racing	1	Pontiac	PHO; 28	MMR	CAL	S99	EVG										43rd	206	
2004	RICH-PAK Racing	4	Pontiac						IRW; 12	S99	RMR	DCS	PHO	CNS	MMR	IRW		43rd	206	
2005	RICH-PAK Racing	4	Pontiac	PHO	MMR	PHO	S99	IRW; 11	EVG	S99; 20	PPR	CAL	DCS	CTS	MMR			33rd	233	

=== ARCA Hooters SuperCar Series ===
(key) (Bold – Pole position awarded by qualifying time. Italics – Pole position earned by points standings or practice time. * – Most laps led.)

ARCA Hooters SuperCar Series results
Year	Team	No.	Make	1	2	3	4	5	6	7	8	9	10	11	12	13	14	15	16	17	18	19	AHSC	Pts	Ref
1993	Jeff Davis Racing	81W	Ford	DAY	FIF	TWS; 23	TAL	KIL	CMS	FRS	TOL	POC	MCH	FRS	POC	KIL	ISF	DSF	TOL	SLM	WIN		106th	-	
1993	Jeff Davis Racing	81	Ford																			ATL; 21	106th	-	

=== American open–wheel racing ===
(key) (Races in bold indicate pole position)

==== Indy Lights ====
Indy Lights results
Year	Team	1	2	3	4	5	6	7	8	9	10	11	12	Rank	Points	Ref
1991	Leading Edge Motorsports	LBH	PHX	MIL; 10	DET; 11	POR; 10	CLE; 10	MEA; 9	TOR; 9	DEN; 7	MDO; 9	NAZ; 6	LAG; 11	**10th**	**39**	

=== Sports car racing ===
(key)

==== 24 Hours of Daytona ====
24 Hours of Daytona results
Year	Class	No	Team	Car	Co-drivers	Laps	Position	Class Pos.	Ref
1991	GTP	5	(United States) Tom Milner Racing	Spice Engineering SE89P Chevrolet	(United States) Mike Brockman (United States) Tim McAdam (United States) Fred Phillips	448	24 ^{DNF}	6 ^{DNF}	
