= 1997 NASCAR Winston West Series =

44th season of the NASCAR Winston West Series

The 1997 NASCAR Winston West Series was the 44th season of the series. The title was won by Butch Gilliland, his first in the series.

== Schedule and results ==
The 1997 season included 14 individual races, although Tucson Raceway Park, Altamont Motorsports Park, Sears Point Raceway Mesa Marin Raceway, and Las Vegas Motor Speedway hosted two races each. The first race at Sears Point was in combination with the NASCAR Winston Cup Series.

Date	Name	Racetrack	Location	Winner
January 19	Winston West 150	Tucson Raceway Park	Tucson, Arizona	Gary Collins
March 23	Winston 200	Altamont Motorsports Park	Tracy, California	Butch Gilliland
May 5	Save Mart Supermarkets 300	Sears Point Raceway	Sonoma, California	Mark Martin
May 10	The Exide NASCAR Select Batteries 200	Tucson Raceway Park	Tucson, Arizona	Gary Smith
May 25	Carquest Auto Parts 200	Mesa Marin Raceway	Bakersfield, California	Butch Gilliland
June 7	Cactus Clash	Las Vegas Motor Speedway	Las Vegas, Nevada	Gary Smith
June 21	Auto Club 200	California Speedway	Fontana, California	Ken Schrader
July 5	Coors Light 200	Evergreen Speedway	Monroe, Washington	Sean Woodside
July 11	Pontiac Widetrack 200	Portland Speedway	Portland, Oregon	Butch Gilliland
July 27	NASCAR 500K	Pikes Peak International Raceway	Fountain, Colorado	Michael Waltrip
August 24	Winston 250	Altamont Motorsports Park	Tracy, California	Sean Woodside
October 5	Fry's Electronics/Iomega Zip 100	Sears Point Raceway	Sonoma, California	Butch Gilliland
October 11	Spears Manufacturing 250	Mesa Marin Raceway	Bakersfield, California	Sean Woodside
November 8	Winston West 300K	Las Vegas Motor Speedway	Las Vegas, Nevada	Ken Schrader

== Full Drivers' Championship ==
(key) Bold – Pole position awarded by time. Italics – Pole position set by owner's points. * – Most laps led. † – Ineligible for West Series points

Pos	Driver	TUS	AMP	SON	TUS	MMR	LVS	CAL	EVG	POR	PPR	AMP	SON	MMR	LVS	Pts
1	Butch Gilliland	15	1*	24	2	**1**	2*	4	5	**1***	3	3	**1***	9	12	2190
2	Sean Woodside	14	**2**	33	3	2*	4	20	1	3	4	**1***	2	**1**	27	2113
3	Gary Smith	2	7	DNQ	**1***	3	1	5	**2***	2	12	4	10	3	11	2101
4	Larry Gunselman	5	11	38	6	6	18	19	6	4	20	2	21	2*	24	1833
5	Kevin Culver	4	4		4	7	17	12	9	5	18	6	18	4	18	1795
6	Scott Gaylord	16	6	DNQ	9	4	7	9	4	13	6	12	23	19	31	1706
7	Bill McAnally	7	17	DNQ	11	10	14	11	12	6	13	7	6	13	38	1677
8	John Kinder		8		13	9	5	7	18	9	19	14	5		40	1377
9	St. James Davis	20	24		14	15	23	16	13	15	11		22	DNQ	35	1363
10	Dan Obrist	10	5		5	18	13	10	3	10						1115
11	Lew Miller	11	12		8	8			10	7	21			22	25	1106
12	Kenny Smith	6	20		7	22	19	25					8	18	19	1052
13	Wayne Jacks	3	3	DNQ	15	19	24						19		10	1027
14	Pappy Pryor					20	16		14	12	10		9	24	37	881
15	Billy Kann	9					8	13			8			20	13	773
16	Jeff Davis						9	17					15	16	15	683
17	Kevin Richards								17		5		14	10	9	660
18	Bill Sedgwick	17	18			5								6	14	657
19	Chuck Pruett	8	9	DNQ	12	21										657
20	George Nordling		15			11			11	8				15		638
21	Brandon Ash		13						8	16	15			21		599
22	Craig Rayburn				10		3	8				13				565
23	Ken Schrader			31†				1*			**2**				1	540
24	Gary Collins	**1***	10								16			23		528
25	Rick Scribner					17						5	13	11		521
26	David Gilliland	21					22	23			24	15				500
27	Lance Wade	19					10	21	15							458
28	L. J. Pryor					14		15			22			14		457
29	Tony Taranto									14	26	10	20			443
30	Sammy Potashnick						**11**	26			9				32	425
31	Kevin Harvick					13								8	8	418
32	Jack Sellers		14									8	17			375
33	Rich Woodland Jr.						6	18							22	356
34	Mike Wallace			22†				2							2	350
35	Kazuteru Wakida					12				11				25		345
36	Rich DeLong Jr.												7	DNQ	21	322
37	David Green			DNQ†				**3**							7	316
38	H. B. Bailey						15				17				26	315
39	Roy Smith								7				12			278
40	Ron Esau	13						6								274
41	Jay Sauter												3	26		255
42	Jim Courage											9	16			253
43	Craig Raudman												4		30	238
44	Bob Howard										14				17	233
45	Ron Burns	12					20									230
46	Eddy Ok								16					17		227
47	Paul Peeples											11	DNQ			218
48	Darrel Krentz						21	22								197
49	Tim McCauley	22	21													197
50	Eric Ash						12								33	191
51	Michael Waltrip			7†							1*					185
52	Rick Mast			DNQ†											3	165
53	Lake Speed														4	165
54	R. K. Smith			DNQ												160
55	Eric Holmes													5		160
56	Kenny Wallace			36†											**5**	160
57	Brett Bodine			6†											6	150
58	Jerry Glanville										7					146
59	Jerry Cain													7		146
60	Victor Mibelli												11			130
61	Davy Lee Liniger													12		127
62	Ron Peterson							14								121
63	Jimmy Kitchens														16	115
64	John Wood					16										115
65	Blair Aiken		16													115
66	Joe Bean	18														109
67	Randy Larsen		19													106
68	Mike Skinner			16†											20	103
69	Mike Welch		22													97
70	Scott Saunders										23					94
71	Mike Naake		23													94
72	Bobby Gerhart														23	94
73	Chuck Jones												24			91
74	Bruce Bechtel							24								91
75	Kenny Irwin Jr.														25*	89
76	Kelly Denton										25					88
77	Richard Neill													27		82
78	Ernie Irvan			8†											29	76
79	Bill Elliott			32†											34	61
80	Jeff Streeter														36	55
81	Gene Christensen														39	46
82	Joel White														DNQ	40
83	Steve Swick														DNQ	37
84	Mark Proctor														DNQ	34
85	Tim Steele														DNQ	31

== See also ==
- 1997 NASCAR Winston Cup Series
- 1997 NASCAR Busch Series
- 1997 NASCAR Craftsman Truck Series
- 1997 NASCAR Goody's Dash Series
