= West Series races at Mesa Marin =

NASCAR West Series races at Mesa Marin Raceway

NASCAR West Series races at Mesa Marin Raceway

NASCAR Winston West Series
- Venue: Mesa Marin Raceway
- Location: Bakersfield, California, United States
- First race: 1977
- Last race: 2005
- Distance: 50 mi (80.467 km) (1977–1979); 75 mi (120.701 km) (1981–1982, 2003, 2004–2005); 76 mi (122.310 km) (2004); 80 mi (128.748 km) (2005); 100 mi (160.934 km) (1980, 1984–1985, 1987–1990, 1993–2001); 125 mi (201.168 km) (1994–1999); 127 mi (204.387 km) (2000); 150 mi (241.402 km) (1992–1996); 200 mi (321.869 km) (1990–1991)
- Laps: 100 (1981–1982, 2003, 2004–2005); 150 (1981–1982, 2003, 2004–2005); 151 (2004); 159 (2005); 200 (1980, 1984–1985, 1987–1990, 1993–2001); 250 (199–1999); 254 (2000); 300(1992–1996); 400 (1990–1991)
- Previous names: First races Winston Mesa Marin 100 (1977–1979); Budweiser 200 (1980); Winston Mesa Marin 150 (1981–1982); Suncrest Motorhomes 200 (1984–1985); American National Bank 200 (1987); Kragen Auto Parts 200 (1988); Spears Manufacturing 200 (1989, 1993, 1996); Spears Manufacturing 400 (1990); California 400 (1991); Vons 300 (1992); California 200 (1994–1995); Carquest Auto Parts 200 (1997); Re-Refined Oil Memorial Day 200 (1998); Forum Marketing 200 (1999); Outback Steakhouse Presents the Coors 200 (2000); Foods Co. 200 (2001); Lucas Oil 150 (2003–2005); Second races Timec 200 (1985); American National Bank 200 (1988); Coors 200 (1989); Spears Manufacturing 400 (1990); Winston 400 (1991); Winston October Classic (1992); Meineke Discount Mufflers 300 (1993); Channellock Tools 250 (1994); Carquest Auto Parts / AC Sparkplug 250 (1995); Carquest Auto Parts 250 (1996); Spears Manufacturing 250 (1997–1998, 2000); Re-Refined Oil 250 (1999); October Classic 150 Presented by StarNursery.com (2004); Ford Motorcraft Parts 150 by 3M (2005); Third races Spears Manufacturing 300 (1994–1996)
- Most wins (driver): Bill Sedgwick (6)
- Most wins (team): Spears Motorsports (6)
- Most wins (manufacturer): Chevrolet (21)

Circuit information
- Surface: Asphalt
- Length: 0.805 km (0.500 mi)
- Turns: 4

The NASCAR West Series, previously known as the NASCAR Winston West Series, held several races at Mesa Marin Raceway in Bakersfield, California. The track hosted the series most years from its opening in 1977 to its closure in 2005.

== History ==
The West Series first visited Mesa Marin in its opening year of 1977, when Jim Reich won in a Chevrolet in his third career start. The series returned to the track every year aside from 1983, 1986, and 2002 until its closure in 2005, running between one and three races per season, with drivers such as Bill Schmitt, Bobby Allison, Hershel McGriff, Roy Smith, Bill Sedgwick, and David Gilliland securing victories at the track.

== Past winners ==
Year	Date	No.	Driver	Team	Manufacturer	Race distance		Race time	Average speed (mph)	Report	Ref
Year	Date	No.	Driver	Team	Manufacturer	Laps	Miles (km)	Race time	Average speed (mph)	Report	Ref
1977	May 28	12	Jim Reich	Arlie Cook	Chevrolet	100	50 (80.47)	0:37.27	80.102	Report	
1978	May 28	01	Jimmy Insolo	Gerald Craker	Pontiac	100	50 (80.47)	0:36:29	82.229	Report	
1979	May 27	73	Bill Schmitt	Schmitt Motorsports	Pontiac (2)	100	50 (80.47)	0:44:22	67.608	Report	
1980	November 8	9	Bobby Allison	Williamson Racing	Oldsmobile	200	100 (160.93)	1:15:13	79.769	Report	
1981	May 30	79	Roy Smith	Robert Beadle	Buick	150	75 (120.7)	0:59:14	75.125	Report	
1982	May 8	78	Jim Robinson	Lois Williams	Oldsmobile (2)	150	75 (120.7)	0:58:44	76.617	Report	
1983	Not held										
1984	October 27	83	Sumner McKnight	McKnight Racing	Chevrolet (2)	200	100 (160.93)	1:24:37	70.908	Report	
1985	June 8	32	Ruben Garcia	Fred Stoke	Chevrolet (3)	200	100 (160.93)	1:19:30	75.472	Report	
1985	October 5	32	Ruben Garcia (2)	Fred Stoke (2)	Chevrolet (4)	200	100 (160.93)	1:19:29	75.488	Report	
1986	Not held										
1987	September 20	04	Hershel McGriff	Gary Smith	Pontiac (3)	200	100 (160.93)	1:31:49	65.336	Report	
1988	May 21	79	Roy Smith (2)	Razore Racing	Ford	200	100 (160.93)	1:30:40	66.176	Report	
1988	August 6	79	Roy Smith (3)	Razore Racing (2)	Ford (2)	200	100 (160.93)	1:33:15	64.343	Report	
1989	May 13	04	Hershel McGriff (2)	McGriff Motorsports	Pontiac (4)	200	100 (160.93)	1:25:36	70.093	Report	
1989	August 5	79	Roy Smith (4)	Razore Racing (3)	Ford (3)	200	100 (160.93)	1:21:37	73.514	Report	
1990	May 20	75	Bill Sedgwick	Spears Motorsports	Chevrolet (5)	400	200 (321.87)	2:58:24	67.265	Report	
1990	October 14	23	Mike Chase	Freymiller Racing	Buick (2)	400	200 (321.87)	2:42:09	74.006	Report	
1991	May 19	23	Mike Chase (2)	Freymiller Racing (2)	Buick (3)	400	200 (321.87)	2:46:59	71.863	Report	
1991	October 13	75	Bill Sedgwick (2)	Spears Motorsports (2)	Chevrolet (6)	400	200 (321.87)	2:51:31	69.970	Report	
1992	May 17	37	Rick Carelli	Chesrown Racing	Chevrolet (7)	300	150 (241.4)	2:01:40	73.973	Report	
1992	October 18	75	Bill Sedgwick (3)	Spears Motorsports (3)	Chevrolet (8)	300	150 (241.4)	2:26:38	61.378	Report	
1993	April 17	75	Bill Sedgwick (4)	Spears Motorsports (4)	Chevrolet (9)	200	100 (160.93)	1:41:47	58.949	Report	
1993	October 17	75	Bill Sedgwick (5)	Spears Motorsports (5)	Chevrolet (10)	300	150 (241.4)	2:17:58	65.233	Report	
1994	April 24	28	Gary Collins	Venable Racing	Chevrolet (11)	200	100 (160.93)	1:51:45	53.691	Report	
1994	June 18	50	Mike Chase (3)	JTC Racing	Chevrolet (12)	250	125 (201.17)	1:47:33	69.735	Report	
1994	October 16	25	Ken Schrader	Ken Schrader Racing	Chevrolet (13)	300	150 (241.4)	2:17:58	65.233	Report	
1995	April 23	75	Bill Sedgwick (6)	Spears Motorsports (6)	Chevrolet (14)	200	100 (160.93)	1:29:43	66.877	Report	
1995	June 17	77	Mike Chase (4)	Steve Sellers Racing	Ford (4)	250	125 (201.17)	1:44:45	71.580	Report	
1995	October 14	37	Doug George	Olson Technology Racing	Ford (5)	300	150 (241.4)	2:09:46	68.700	Report	
1996	April 27	37	Larry Gunselman	Race Stuff Motorsports	Ford (6)	200	100 (160.93)	1:38:57	60.637	Report	
1996	August 24	3	Joe Bean	Bean & Krebs Motorsports	Chevrolet (15)	250	125 (201.17)	1:48:03	69.412	Report	
1996	October 12	07	Lance Hooper	Golden West Motorsports	Pontiac (5)	300	150 (241.4)	2:07:42	70.477	Report	
1997	May 25	38	Butch Gilliland	Stroppe Motorsports	Ford (7)	200	100 (160.93)	1:25:42	70.012	Report	
1997	October 11	07	Sean Woodside	Golden West Motorsports (2)	Pontiac (6)	250	125 (201.17)	1:51:17	67.396	Report	
1998	May 24	1	Butch Gilliland (2)	Hilton Racing	Ford (8)	200	100 (160.93)	1:44:56	57.179	Report	
1998	October 17	07	Sean Woodside (2)	Golden West Motorsports (3)	Pontiac (7)	250	125 (201.17)	1:52:30	66.667	Report	
1999	May 30	1	Butch Gilliland (3)	Hilton Racing (2)	Ford (9)	200	100 (160.93)	1:30:30	66.298	Report	
1999	October 17	16	Sean Woodside (3)	Bill McAnally Racing	Chevrolet (16)	250	125 (201.17)	1:43:34	72.417	Report	
2000	March 25	16	Brendan Gaughan	Bill McAnally Racing (2)	Chevrolet (17)	200	100 (160.93)	1:29:40	66.914	Report	
2000	October 22	32	Eric Norris	Matt Stowe	Ford (10)	254*	127 (408.77)	1:59:14	63.908	Report	
2001	March 18	3	Steve Portenga	Portenga Motorsports	Chevrolet (18)	200	100 (160.93)	1:35:29	62.838	Report	
2002	Not held										
2003	October 19	9	Mike Duncan	MB Duncan Motorsports	Chevrolet (19)	150	75 (120.7)	1:01:48	72.816	Report	
2004	March 27	88	David Gilliland	Golembeski Racing	Chevrolet (20)	151*	75.5 (121.51)	1:08:10	66.115	Report	
2004	October 17	61	Brett Thompson	Thompson Motorsports	Chevrolet (21)	150	75 (120.7)	1:10:20	63.981	Report	
2005	April 9	08	Scott Lynch	Winward Racing Enterprises	Dodge	150	75 (120.7)	1:07:15	66.914	Report	
2005	October 15	2	Mike David	Randy Lynch	Ford (11)	159*	79.5 (127.94)	1:27:49	54.318	Report	

Notes

- 2000: Race extended from 250 to 254 laps due to green/white/checker.
- 2004: Race extended from 150 to 151 laps due to green/white/checker.
- 2005: Race extended from 150 to 159 laps due to green/white/checker.

=== Manufacturer wins ===
# Wins	Make	Years Won
21	(United States) Chevrolet	1977, 1984, 1985, 1990, 1991, 1992, 1993, 1994, 1995, 1996, 1999, 2000, 2001, 2003, 2004
11	(United States) Ford	1988, 1989, 1995, 1996, 1997, 1998, 1999, 2000, 2005
7	(United States) Pontiac	1978, 1979, 1987, 1989, 1996, 1997, 1998
3	(United States) Buick	1981, 1990, 1991
2	(United States) Oldsmobile	1980, 1982
1	(United States) Dodge	2005
