= Kevin Richards (racing driver) =

American racing driver (born 1962)

- Born: June 13, 1962 (age 64); Spokane, Washington

ARCA Menards Series West career
- 81 races run over 7 years
- Best finish: 2nd (2002)
- First race: 1997 Coors Light 200 (Evergreen)
- Last race: 2003 Lucas Oil 150 (Mesa Marin) (Mesa Marin)
- First win: 1999 Coors Light 200 Pres. by Albertson's (Evergreen)
- Last win: 2000 NAPA Auto Parts 100 (Phoenix)
Wins	Top tens	Poles
4	49	2
- Statistics up to date as of February 9, 2026.

Kevin Richards (born June 13, 1962) is an American former professional stock car racing driver. He primarily competed in the NASCAR Winston West Series, competing full time from 1998 to 2003.

== Racing career ==
Richards drove dirt cars in the late 1970s. He was the crew chief for Kirk Rogers in his 1994 NASCAR Northwest Tour championship season, but after Rogers moved to the American Speed Association, Richards began working for Gene Monaco, who gave him an opportunity to drive following a crash in testing that removed him from the drivers' seat. He would compete in three Northwest Tour races in 1995, as well as in a NASCAR Southwest Tour race at Phoenix, where he finished fifth in a forty-two car field. Richards than ran full time in the Northwest Tour in 1996, competing for rookie of the year. Richards scored a best finish of fourth during the season and finished eleventh in the standings. He also competed in two Southwest Tour races during the year.

In 1997, Richards made his NASCAR Winston West Series debut for Monaco's team, only completing two laps at Evergreen Speedway before retiring with engine issues. In his next start at Pikes Peak International Raceway, he scored a top-five finish in fifth. He would then run the final three races of the season, scoring two more top ten finishes. He would also make his final Northwest tour starts during the year, as well as running a handful of Southwest Tour races and scoring a pair of top-ten finishes. Richards competed full time in the Winston West Series for the first time in 1998, finishing in the top ten eight times and finishing fourth in the final standings. The following season was a breakout year for Richards, as he began winning in the series; his first win came at Evergreen, leading 34 laps and beating eventual champion Sean Woodside by 1.8 seconds. He would also win the season's second Las Vegas race, leading 75 of 100 laps. His most notable career win came in the season finale, which was held at Twin Ring Motegi Superspeedway in Motegi, Tochigi, Japan, the first NASCAR points paying race held outside North America and the final NASCAR race in Japan. Richards led only the final four laps en route to his third win of the season. He finished fourth in the final standings. He scored his fourth and final career win in the 2000 season opener at Phoenix, and went on to finish fifth in the standings. Richards had his worst season in 2001, where he finished eleventh in the standings, posting his worst average finish of 13.3. He rebounded in 2002, where despite going winless, he finished second in the standings, having finished in the top ten in all ten races. His final season was 2003, where he scored his only career pole positions and finished fourth in the standings. By 2011, Richards had retired from driving and returned to a crew chief role.
