= Austin Cameron =

American racing driver (born 1977)

- Born: January 24, 1977 (age 49); El Cajon, California, U.S.
- Awards: 1998 NASCAR Winston West Series Rookie of the Year

NASCAR Cup Series career
- 2 races run over 2 years
- Best finish: 83rd (2002)
- First race: 2002 Dodge/Save Mart 350 (Sonoma)
- Last race: 2004 Dodge/Save Mart 350 (Sonoma)
Wins	Top tens	Poles
0	0	0

NASCAR O'Reilly Auto Parts Series career
- 3 races run over 2 years
- Best finish: 94th (2000)
- First race: 2000 Econo Lodge 200 (Nazareth)
- Last race: 2002 Auto Club 300 (Fontana)
Wins	Top tens	Poles
0	0	0

NASCAR FedEx Freight Truck Series career
- 3 races run over 1 year
- Best finish: 56th (1999)
- First race: 1999 goracing.com 200 (Michigan)
- Last race: 1999 NAPA Auto Parts 200 (California)
Wins	Top tens	Poles
0	0	0
- Statistics up to date as of March 10, 2014.

Austin Alexander Cameron (born January 24, 1977) is an American former stock car racing driver. He competed mainly in what is now the ARCA Menards Series West, formerly the Winston West Series, twice finishing second in series points.

== Racing career ==
Born in El Cajon, California, Cameron began racing go-karts at the age of nine. He competed in various types of go-karts before eventually graduating to stockcars. He won the Rookie of the Year award in 1996 in the late model division at Willow Springs Raceway in Rosamond, California. Despite not attending the first NASCAR Winston West Series race of the season in 1998, Cameron went on to win the Rookie of the Year Award and finished fourth in the championship standings. He was among a contingent of NWWS drivers to participate in the NASCAR exhibition event in Japan at Twin Ring Motegi in November 1998. He collected his first series win in 1999 at Irwindale Speedway and finished the year second in the championship standings.

Cameron made his Sprint Cup debut at Infineon Raceway in 2002, he finished 42nd due to a clutch failure on lap 24. He made his next start two years later at Infineon in 2004, finishing in 38th, 32 laps down.

In 2003, Cameron was diagnosed with Non-Hodgkin lymphoma; after three years of treatment that included open heart surgery, he returned to racing.

== Personal life ==
Cameron holds a business degree from the University of California, Santa Barbara, and acts as president of TC Construction, founded by his father. He is married, to Rachelle, and the couple have two children.

== Motorsports career results ==
=== NASCAR ===
(key) (Bold - Pole position awarded by qualifying time. Italics - Pole position earned by points standings or practice time. * – Most laps led. ** – All laps led.)

==== Nextel Cup Series ====
NASCAR Nextel Cup Series results
Year	Team	No.	Make	1	2	3	4	5	6	7	8	9	10	11	12	13	14	15	16	17	18	19	20	21	22	23	24	25	26	27	28	29	30	31	32	33	34	35	36	NNCC	Pts	Ref
1999	AC Motorsports	89	Chevy	DAY	CAR	LVS; DNQ	ATL	DAR	TEX	BRI	MAR	TAL	CAL	RCH	CLT	DOV	MCH	POC	SON; DNQ	DAY	NHA	POC	IND	GLN	MCH	BRI	DAR	RCH	NHA	DOV	MAR	CLT	TAL	CAR	PHO	HOM	ATL			N/A	0	
2000	AC Motorsports	89	Chevy	DAY	CAR	LVS; DNQ	ATL	DAR	BRI	TEX	MAR	TAL	CAL	RCH	CLT	DOV	MCH	POC	SON	DAY	NHA	POC	IND	GLN	MCH	BRI	DAR	RCH	NHA	DOV	MAR	CLT	TAL	CAR	PHO	HOM	ATL			N/A	0	
2002	Orleans Racing	62	Chevy	DAY	CAR	LVS	ATL	DAR	BRI	TEX	MAR	TAL	CAL	RCH	CLT	DOV	POC	MCH	SON; 42	DAY	CHI	NHA	POC	IND	GLN; DNQ	MCH	BRI	DAR	RCH	NHA	DOV	KAN	TAL	CLT	MAR	ATL	CAR	PHO	HOM	83rd	37	
2004	Bill McAnally Racing	61	Chevy	DAY	CAR	LVS	ATL	DAR	BRI	TEX	MAR	TAL	CAL	RCH	CLT	DOV	POC	MCH	SON; 38	DAY	CHI	NHA	POC	IND	GLN	MCH	BRI	CAL	RCH	NHA	DOV	TAL	KAN	CLT	MAR	ATL	PHO	DAR	HOM	84th	49	

==== Busch Series ====
NASCAR Busch Series results
Year	Team	No.	Make	1	2	3	4	5	6	7	8	9	10	11	12	13	14	15	16	17	18	19	20	21	22	23	24	25	26	27	28	29	30	31	32	33	34	NBSC	Pts	Ref
2000	Team SABCO	82	Chevy	DAY	CAR	LVS	ATL	DAR	BRI	TEX	NSV	TAL	CAL	RCH	NHA	CLT	DOV	SBO	MYB	GLN	MLW	NZH; 38	PPR; 35	GTY	IRP	MCH	BRI	DAR	RCH	DOV	CLT	CAR	MEM	PHO	HOM			94th	107	
2002	Danford Motorsports	41	Ford	DAY	CAR	LVS	DAR	BRI	TEX	NSH	TAL	CAL; 42	RCH	NHA	NZH	CLT	DOV	NSH	KEN	MLW	DAY	CHI	GTY	PPR	IRP	MCH	BRI	DAR	RCH	DOV	KAN	CLT	MEM	ATL	CAR	PHO	HOM	122nd	37	

==== Craftsman Truck Series ====
NASCAR Craftsman Truck Series results
Year	Team	No.	Make	1	2	3	4	5	6	7	8	9	10	11	12	13	14	15	16	17	18	19	20	21	22	23	24	25	26	27	NCTC	Pts	Ref
1998	Vintage Motorsports	4	Chevy	WDW	HOM	PHO	POR	EVG	I70	GLN	TEX	BRI	MLW	NZH	CAL	PPR	IRP	NHA	FLM	NSV	HPT	LVL	RCH	MEM	GTY	MAR	SON	MMR	PHO	LVS; DNQ	124th	31	
1999	Vintage Motorsports	4	Chevy	HOM	PHO	EVG	MMR	MAR	MEM	PPR	I70	BRI	TEX	PIR	GLN	MLW	NSV	NZH	MCH; 23	NHA	IRP	GTY	HPT	RCH	LVS; 15	LVL	TEX	CAL; 34			56th	273	

==== K&N Pro Series West ====
NASCAR K&N Pro Series West results
Year	Team	No.	Make	1	2	3	4	5	6	7	8	9	10	11	12	13	14	15	NKNPSWC	Pts	Ref
1998	AC Motorsports	12	Chevy	TUS	LVS; 32	PHO; 6	CAL; 8	HPT; 9	MMR; 10	AMP; 3	POR; 6	CAL; 2	PPR; 2	EVG; 12	SON; 3	MMR; 7	LVS; 4		4th	1909	
1999	AC Motorsports	12	Chevy	TUS; 14	LVS; 5	PHO; 3	**CAL**; 29	PPR; 2	MMR; 6	IRW; 23	EVG; 13	POR; 7	IRW; 1*	RMR; 17	LVS; 2	MMR; 15	MOT; 2		2nd	1981	
2000	AC Motorsports	12	Chevy	PHO; 22	MMR; 14	LVS; 2	CAL; 29	**LAG**; 4	IRW; 21	POR	EVG	IRW; 15	RMR; 3	MMR	**IRW**; 6				17th	1187	
2001	AC Motorsports	12	Chevy	PHO; 3	LVS; 4	TUS; 14	**MMR**; 2	CAL; 3	IRW; 16	LAG; 11	KAN; 8	EVG; 3	CNS; 8	IRW; 21	RMR; 9	LVS; 2	IRW; 6		3rd	2048	
2002	Bill McAnally Racing	16	Chevy	PHO; 1*	**LVS**; 1	CAL; 3	**KAN**; 17	**EVG**; 11*	IRW; 1*	S99; 12	RMR; 1	DCS; 1	LVS; 25						3rd	1542	
2003	Bill McAnally Racing	16	Chevy	PHO; 4	LVS; 17	CAL	MAD	TCR	EVG	IRW; 20	**S99**; 1*	**RMR**; 9	**DCS**; 1**	PHO; 7	MMR; 3				15th	1199	
2004	Bill McAnally Racing	16	Chevy	PHO; 2	MMR; 12	CAL; 13	S99; 1	EVG; 1*	IRW; 1	S99; 17	RMR; 1	DCS; 6	PHO; 7	CNS; 2	MMR; 4	IRW; 1*			2nd	2074	
2006	MRG Motorsports	88	Chevy	PHO; 28	PHO; 6	S99; 18	IRW; 25	SON; 14	DCS; 16	IRW; 1	EVG; 7	S99; 4	CAL; 15	CTS; 3	AMP; 1				8th	1631	
2008	Bill McAnally Racing	18	Toyota	AAS; 17	PHO; 13	CTS; 2		CNS; 8	SON; 7	IRW; 6	DCS; 18	EVG; 14	MMP; 3	IRW; 24	AMP; 5	AAS; 21			7th	1770	
2008	Bill McAnally Racing	14	Toyota				IOW; 3												7th	1770	
2012	AC Motorsports	12	Toyota	PHO	LHC	MMP; 5	S99	IOW	BIR	LVS	SON; 8	EVG	CNS	IOW	PIR; 28	SMP	AAS	PHO	30th	91	
2013	AC Motorsports	10	Chevy	PHO	S99	BIR	IOW	L44	SON; 16	CNS	IOW	EVG	SPO	MMP; 8	SMP	AAS	KER	PHO	40th	64	
2014	AC Motorsports	10	Chevy	PHO	IRW	S99	IOW	KCR	SON; Wth	SLS	CNS	IOW	EVG	KCR	MMP; 8	AAS	PHO		46th	49	

=== ARCA Re/Max Series ===
(key) (Bold – Pole position awarded by qualifying time. Italics – Pole position earned by points standings or practice time. * – Most laps led.)

ARCA Re/Max Series results
Year	Team	No.	Make	1	2	3	4	5	6	7	8	9	10	11	12	13	14	15	16	17	18	19	20	21	22	23	24	25	ARSC	Pts	Ref
2000	AC Motorsports	12	Chevy	DAY	SLM	AND	CLT	KIL	FRS	MCH	POC	TOL	KEN; 21	BLN	POC	WIN	ISF	KEN	DSF	SLM	CLT	TAL	ATL; DNQ						103rd	150	
2001	Cunningham Motorsports	4	Chevy	DAY	NSH	WIN	SLM	GTY	KEN	CLT	KAN; 8	MCH	POC	MEM	GLN	KEN	MCH	POC	NSH	ISF	CHI	DSF	SLM	TOL	BLN	CLT	TAL	ATL	119th	190	
2002	TWC Motorsports	68	Chevy	DAY	ATL	NSH	SLM	KEN	CLT	KAN; 22	POC	MCH	TOL	SBO	KEN; 3	BLN	POC	NSH	ISF	WIN	DSF	CHI	SLM	TAL	CLT				85th	355	
