= Sean Woodside =

American racing driver (born 1970)

- Born: October 16, 1970 (age 56) Santa Clarita, California, U.S.

NASCAR West Series career
- Debut season: 1997
- Former teams: Golden West Motorsports, Bill McAnally Racing, Team Walker Motorsports, Adair Motorsports
- Starts: 74
- Championships: 1
- Wins: 7
- Poles: 12
- Best finish: 1st in 1999
- Finished last season: 14th (2004)

Previous series
- 1995, 1998–2003: NASCAR Southwest Series

NASCAR Cup Series career
- 1 race run over 2 years
- 1997 position: 64th
- Best finish: 64th (1997)
- First race: 1997 Save Mart Supermarkets 300 (Sonoma)
Wins	Top tens	Poles
0	0	0

NASCAR O'Reilly Auto Parts Series career
- 1 race run over 1 year
- 2001 position: 152nd
- Best finish: 152nd (2001)
- First race: 2001 Auto Club 300 (Fontana)
Wins	Top tens	Poles
0	0	0

NASCAR FedEx Freight Truck Series career
- 2 races run over 1 year
- 2000 position: 81st
- Best finish: 81st (2000)
- First race: 2000 Chevy Trucks NASCAR 150 Phoenix
- Last race: 2000 Dodge California 250 Mesa Marin
Wins	Top tens	Poles
0	0	0
- Statistics up to date as of September 8, 2020.

Sean Woodside (born October 16, 1970) is an American professional stock car racing driver. He is a veteran of what is now the ARCA Menards Series West, having raced in the series in the late 1990s to early 2000s, which included five full seasons, seven wins, and the 1999 series championship. During that time, Woodside also made at least one start in each of NASCAR's top three series.

== Motorsports career results ==
=== NASCAR ===
(key) (Bold – Pole position awarded by qualifying time. Italics – Pole position earned by points standings or practice time. * – Most laps led.)

==== Winston Cup Series ====
NASCAR Winston Cup Series results
Year	Team	No.	Make	1	2	3	4	5	6	7	8	9	10	11	12	13	14	15	16	17	18	19	20	21	22	23	24	25	26	27	28	29	30	31	32	33	34	NWCC	Pts	Ref
1997	Golden West Motorsports	07	Pontiac	DAY	CAR	RCH	ATL	DAR	TEX	BRI	MAR	SON; 33	TAL	CLT	DOV	POC	MCH	CAL	DAY	NHA	POC	IND	GLN	MCH	BRI	DAR	RCH	NHA	DOV	MAR	CLT	TAL	CAR	PHO	ATL			64th	64	
1999	SBIII Motorsports	58	Ford	DAY	CAR	LVS	ATL	DAR	TEX	BRI	MAR	TAL	CAL	RCH	CLT	DOV	MCH	POC	SON; DNQ	DAY	NHA	POC	IND	GLN	MCH	BRI	DAR	RCH	NHA	DOV	MAR	CLT	TAL	CAR	PHO	HOM	ATL	N/A	0	

==== Busch Series ====
NASCAR Busch Series results
Year	Team	No.	Make	1	2	3	4	5	6	7	8	9	10	11	12	13	14	15	16	17	18	19	20	21	22	23	24	25	26	27	28	29	30	31	32	33	NBSC	Pts	Ref
2001	Brewco Motorsports	47	Chevy	DAY	CAR	LVS	ATL	DAR	BRI	TEX	NSH	TAL	CAL; 40	RCH	NHA	NZH	CLT	DOV	KEN	MLW	GLN	CHI	GTY	PPR	IRP	MCH	BRI	DAR	RCH	DOV	KAN	CLT	MEM	PHO	CAR	HOM	152nd		

==== Craftsman Truck Series ====
NASCAR Craftsman Truck Series results
Year	Team	No.	Make	1	2	3	4	5	6	7	8	9	10	11	12	13	14	15	16	17	18	19	20	21	22	23	24	NCTC	Pts	Ref
2000	Brevak Racing	31	Ford	DAY	HOM	PHO; 30	MMR; 24	MAR	PIR	GTY	MEM	PPR	EVG	TEX	KEN	GLN	MLW	NHA	NZH	MCH	IRP	NSV	CIC	RCH	DOV	TEX	CAL	81st	164	

==== West Series ====
NASCAR West Series results
Year	Team	No.	Make	1	2	3	4	5	6	7	8	9	10	11	12	13	14	NWSC	Pts	Ref
1997	Golden West Motorsports	07	Pontiac	TUS; 14	**AMP**; 2	SON; 33	TUS; 3	MMR; 2*	LVS; 4	CAL; 20	EVG; 1	POR; 3	PPR; 4	**AMP**; 1*	SON; 2	**MMR**; 1	LVS; 27	2nd	2113	
1998	Golden West Motorsports	07	Pontiac	TUS; 4	LVS; 9	PHO; 4	CAL; 4	HPT; 1	MMR; 7*	**AMP**; 5*	POR; 3	CAL; 3	PPR; 4	EVG; 8	SON; 14	**MMR**; 1*	LVS; 10	2nd	2215	
1999	Bill McAnally Racing	16	Chevy	TUS; 1	LVS; 15	PHO; 7	CAL; 9	PPR; 3*	MMR; 15	IRW; 13	EVG; 2	**POR**; 6*	IRW; 10	**RMR**; 6	LVS; 17	MMR; 1	MOT; 5	1st	2075	
2000	Team Walker Motorsports	45	Chevy	PHO	MMR	LVS	CAL	LAG	IRW; 10	POR; 5	EVG	IRW	RMR	MMR; 9	IRW; 16			24th	542	
2001	Team Walker Motorsports	45	Chevy	PHO; 32	LVS; 3	TUS; 15	MMR; 17	CAL; 15	IRW; 3	**LAG**; 3	KAN; 5	**EVG**; 10	**CNS**; 6	**IRW**; 3	RMR; 18	LVS; 7	**IRW**; 16	6th	1914	
2002	Team Walker Motorsports	45	Chevy	PHO; 4	LVS; 2	CAL	KAN	EVG	IRW	S99	RMR	DCS	LVS					26th	345	
2004	Adair Motorsports	3	Pontiac	PHO	MMR; 23	CAL; 26	S99; 13	EVG; 12	IRW; 24	S99; 16	RMR; 7	DCS; 16	PHO; 20	CNS; 8	MMR; 3	IRW; 15		14th	1425	
