= 1999 NASCAR Coca-Cola 500 =

14th race of the 1999 NASCAR Winston West Series

Race details
- Race 14 of 14 in the 1999 NASCAR Winston West Series season
- Date: November 20, 1999
- Official name: '99 NASCAR Coca-Cola 500
- Location: Twin Ring Motegi Superspeedway in Motegi, Tochigi, Japan
- Course: Oval
- Course length: 1.549 miles (2.493 km)
- Distance: 201 laps, 311.349 mi (501.067 km)
- Average speed: 108.906 miles per hour (175.267 km/h)

Pole position
Driver	Mike Wallace	Ultra Motorsports

Most laps led
Driver	Mike Wallace	Ultra Motorsports
- Laps: 117

Winner
No. 85	Kevin Richards	Monaco Enterprises

The 1999 NASCAR Coca-Cola 500, officially the '99 NASCAR Coca-Cola 500, was the fourteenth and final race of the 1999 NASCAR Winston West Series season. It is notable for being the first points paying NASCAR event held outside of North America. It was also the last NASCAR race held in Japan. The race was held on Saturday, November 20, 1999, at Twin Ring Motegi Superspeedway, a 1.549 mi (2.493 km) oval shaped racetrack in Motegi, Tochigi, Japan. The race took the scheduled 201 laps to complete. The race was won by Kevin Richards, his third win of the season. Richards led the final four laps en route to victory, while Sean Woodside secured the championship in fifth place, only needing to finish 28th or better to win the title. The race ended under caution, with Austin Cameron finishing second, Eric Norris in third, Brendan Gaughan in fourth, and Woodside rounding out the top five.

== Report ==
=== Background ===
Mobility Resort Motegi (モビリティリゾートもてぎ) is a motorsport venue located in Motegi, Tochigi Prefecture, Japan. Called Twin Ring Motegi (ツインリンクもてぎ) at the time of the race, the venue's name came from the facility having two race tracks: a 2.493 km (1.549 mi) oval track and a 4.801 km (2.983 mi) road course. It was built in 1997 by Honda Motor Co., Ltd., as part of the company's effort to bring the Championship Auto Racing Teams series to Japan.

==== Entry list ====
#	Driver	Owner	Manufacturer
1	Butch Gilliland	Richard Hilton	Ford
2	Mike Wallace	Jim Smith	Ford
3	Steve Portenga	James Offenbach	Chevrolet
05	John Metcalf	Randy Morse	Chevrolet
6	Wayne Jacks	Doc Faustina	Chevrolet
7	Gary Smith	Deborah Beal	Pontiac
09	Andy Houston	Dick Midgley	Pontiac
12	Austin Cameron	Terry Cameron	Chevrolet
13	Dean Kuhn	Dan Chittenden	Chevrolet
14	Jason Small	Ken Small	Chevrolet
16	Sean Woodside	Bill McAnally	Chevrolet
18	Mike Chase	Gene Christensen	Chevrolet
19	Hideo Fukuyama	Unknown	Ford
20	Brendan Gaughan	Walker Evans	Chevrolet
23	Brandon Ash	Ed Ash	Ford
25	Terry Wyhoon	Bob Jane	Ford
27	Kim Jane	Bob Jane	Chevrolet
28	Neville Lance	Neville Lance	Ford
32	Eric Norris	Matt Stowe	Ford
38	Manabu Orido	Bill Stroppe	Ford
56	Bobby Dotter	Sammy Potashnick	Ford
61	Doc Faustina	Doc Faustina	Ford
65	Sammy Potashnick	Sammy Potashnick	Ford
66	Billy Turner	Sheri Turner	Chevrolet
67	Scott Gaylord	Mike Duncan	Ford
77	Joe Bean	Joe Nava	Ford
85	Kevin Richards	Gene Monaco	Chevrolet
87	Keiichi Tsuchiya	Gene Christensen	Chevrolet
92	Ron Barfield Jr.	Ron Barfield Jr.	Ford
98	Kevin Culver	Richard Kieper	Chevrolet

== Qualifying ==
Mike Wallace won the pole with a speed of 156.167 mph. Hideo Fukuyama and Sammy Potashnick started from the back due to needing a backup car.

== Race results ==
Fin	St	#	Driver	Owner	Make	Laps	Led	Status	Pts
1	17	85	Kevin Richards	Gene Monaco	Chevrolet	201	16	Running	180
2	3	12	Austin Cameron	Terry Cameron	Pontiac	201	0	Running	170
3	4	32	Eric Norris	Matt Stowe	Ford	201	21	Running	170
4	2	20	Brendan Gaughan	Walker Evans	Chevrolet	201	42	Running	165
5	18	16	Sean Woodside	Bill McAnally	Chevrolet	201	0	Running	155
6	13	3	Steve Portenga	James Offenbach	Chevrolet	200	0	Running	150
7	11	77	Joe Bean	Joe Nava	Ford	200	0	Running	1468
8	15	27	Kim Jane	Bob Jane	Chevrolet	200	0	Running	142
9	8	14	Jason Small	Ken Small	Chevrolet	200	1	Running	143
10	6	05	John Metcalf	Randy Morse	Chevrolet	198	0	Accident	134
11	26	65	Sammy Potashnick	Sammy Potashnick	Ford	197	0	Running	130
12	20	92	Ron Barfield Jr.	Ron Barfield Jr.	Chevrolet	196	0	Running	127
13	22	66	Billy Turner	Sheri Turner	Chevrolet	196	0	Running	124
14	25	7	Gary Smith	Deborah Beal	Pontiac	195	0	Running	121
15	21	19	Hideo Fukuyama	Unknown	Ford	192	0	Running	118
16	7	67	Scott Gaylord	Mike Duncan	Ford	191	1	Accident	120
17	16	09	Andy Houston	Dick Midgley	Pontiac	187	0	Engine	112
18	30	98	Kevin Culver	Richard Kieper	Ford	164	0	Running	109
19	1	2	Mike Wallace	Jim Smith	Ford	156	117	Overheating	116
20	14	23	Brandon Ash	Ed Ash	Ford	138	0	Running	103
21	19	1	Butch Gilliland	Richard Hilton	Ford	131	0	Running	100
22	9	87	Keiichi Tsuchiya	Gene Christensen	Chevrolet	125	0	Engine	97
23	26	28	Neville Lance	Neville Lance	Ford	81	0	Engine	94
24	10	56	Bobby Dotter	Sammy Potashnick	Ford	60	0	Engine	91
25	12	18	Mike Chase	Gene Christensen	Chevrolet	52	3	Engine	93
26	23	6	Wayne Jacks	Doc Faustina	Chevrolet	48	0	Oil Pump	85
27	27	61	Doc Faustina	Doc Faustina	Ford	47	0	Engine	82
28	29	13	Dean Kuhn	Dan Chittenden	Chevrolet	23	0	Vibration	79
29	24	25	Terry Wyhoon	Bob Jane	Ford	18	0	Engine	76
30	5	38	Manabu Orido	Bill Stroppe	Ford	3	0	Accident	73

== Standings after the race ==
	Pos	Driver	Points
	1	Sean Woodside	2075
	2	Austin Cameron	1983 (–92)
	3	Joe Bean	1955 (–120)
3	4	Kevin Richards	1910 (–165)
1	5	Steve Portenga	1889 (–186)
4	6	Jason Small	1845 (–230)
2	7	Mike Chase	1833 (–242)
	8	Brandon Ash	1831 (–244)
2	9	Sammy Potashnick	1830 (–245)
1	10	Butch Gilliland	1821 (–254)

- Note: Only the first 10 positions are included for the driver standings.

Previous race: 1999 Re-Refined Oil 250	NASCAR Winston West Series; 1999 season	Next race: 2000 NAPA Auto Parts 100
