= Troy Cline =

American racing driver (born 1969)

- Born: September 12, 1969 (age 57); Hawthorne, California, U.S.

NASCAR O'Reilly Auto Parts Series career
- 5 races run over 2 years
- Best finish: 71st (2002)
- First race: 2002 Hardee's 250 (Richmond)
- Last race: 2003 Hardee's 250 (Richmond)
Wins	Top tens	Poles
0	0	0

Troy Cline (born September 12, 1969) is an American former stock car racing driver from Hawthorne, California. Cline competed in 22 NASCAR Winston West Series races between 1999 and 2001, reaching the top-ten seven times. Cline competed in five NASCAR Busch Series races from 2002 to 2003, his best finish being a 21st at Nazareth Speedway in 2002.
