= Doc Faustina =

American racing driver (1939–2022)

- Born: February 1, 1939; New Orleans, Louisiana, U.S.
- Died: January 23, 2022 (aged 82); Las Vegas, Nevada, U.S.

NASCAR Cup Series career
- 10 races run over 4 years
- Best finish: 61st (1972)
- First race: 1971 Winston 500 (Talladega)
- Last race: 1976 Mason-Dixon 500 (Dover)
Wins	Top tens	Poles
0	0	0

ARCA Menards Series West career
- 10 races run over 3 years
- Best finish: 18th (1999)
- First race: 1979 Winston Las Vegas 100 (Craig Road)
- Last race: 1999 NASCAR Coca-Cola 500 (Motegi)
Wins	Top tens	Poles
0	0	0
- Statistics up to date as of August 31, 2026.

Leonard “Doc” Faustina (February 1, 1939 – January 23, 2022) was an American NASCAR Winston Cup Series driver who competed from 1971 to 1976.

== Career ==
Faustina competed in 1502 laps, earned $7,995 in winnings (over $36,500 when adjusted for inflation), and raced 2,693.3 miles (4,334.4 km). On average, Faustina started in 31st place and ended in 28th place. Although he never won a championship or a race, Faustina competed in ten events during his four-year NASCAR Cup Series career. At the age of 60, Faustina competed in the 1999 season of the NASCAR Winston West Series. His final start came in the 1999 NASCAR Coca-Cola 500 at Twin Ring Motegi Superspeedway in Motegi, Tochigi, Japan.

Faustina was a NASCAR Winston Cup owner from 1971 to 1976. He employed race car drivers Richard Childress (who eventually became the owner of Richard Childress Racing), Neil Castles, Jim Vandiver, James Hylton, Wendell Scott, Dave Marcis and J.D. McDuffie.

Faustina died on January 23, 2022, at the age of 82.
