= 1993 Save Mart Supermarkets 300K =

Tenth race of the 1993 NASCAR Winston Cup Series

Race details
- Race 10 of 30 in the 1993 NASCAR Winston Cup Series
- The 1993 Save Mart Supermarkets 300K program cover, featuring Bill Elliott and Ernie Irvan.
- Date: May 16, 1993
- Official name: 5th Annual Save Mart Supermarkets 300K
- Location: Sonoma, California, Sears Point Raceway
- Course: Permanent racing facility
- Course length: 2.52 miles (4.06 km)
- Distance: 74 laps, 186.48 mi (300.11 km)
- Scheduled distance: 74 laps, 186.48 mi (300.11 km)
- Average speed: 77.013 miles per hour (123.940 km/h)
- Attendance: 90,000

Pole position
Driver	Dale Earnhardt	Richard Childress Racing
- Time: 1:38.783

Most laps led
Driver	Dale Earnhardt	Richard Childress Racing
- Laps: 33

Winner
No. 15	Geoff Bodine	Bud Moore Engineering

Television in the United States
- Network: ESPN
- Announcers: Bob Jenkins, Ned Jarrett, Benny Parsons

Radio in the United States
- Radio: Motor Racing Network

The 1993 Save Mart Supermarkets 300K was the tenth stock car race of the 1993 NASCAR Winston Cup Series season, the fourth race of the 1993 NASCAR Winston West Series season, and the fifth iteration of the event. The race was held on Sunday, May 16, 1993, at the Grand Prix layout of Sears Point Raceway, a 2.52 miles (4.06 km) permanent road course layout. The race took the scheduled 74 laps to complete. In the final laps of the race, Bud Moore Engineering driver Geoff Bodine would manage to fend off numerous challenges for the lead from Morgan–McClure Motorsports driver Ernie Irvan and Hendrick Motorsports driver Ricky Rudd to take his 15th career NASCAR Winston Cup Series victory and his only victory of the season. To fill out the top three, the aforementioned Irvan and Rudd would finish second and third, respectively.

== Background ==
The layout of Sears Point Raceway used by NASCAR at the time.

Sears Point Raceway is one of two road courses to hold NASCAR races, the other being Watkins Glen International. The standard road course at Sears Point Raceway is a 12-turn course that is 2.52 miles (4.06 km) long; the track was modified in 1998, adding the Chute, which bypassed turns 5 and 6, shortening the course to 1.95 miles (3.14 km). The Chute was only used for NASCAR events such as this race, and was criticized by many drivers, who preferred the full layout. In 2001, it was replaced with a 70-degree turn, 4A, bringing the track to its current dimensions of 1.99 miles (3.20 km).

=== Entry list ===
- (R) denotes rookie driver.

#	Driver	Team	Make
1	Rick Mast	Precision Products Racing	Ford
2	Rusty Wallace	Penske Racing South	Pontiac
3	Dale Earnhardt	Richard Childress Racing	Chevrolet
4	Ernie Irvan	Morgan–McClure Motorsports	Chevrolet
04	Hershel McGriff	TTC Motorsports	Chevrolet
5	Ricky Rudd	Hendrick Motorsports	Chevrolet
6	Mark Martin	Roush Racing	Ford
7	Tommy Kendall	AK Racing	Ford
8	Sterling Marlin	Stavola Brothers Racing	Ford
9	P. J. Jones (R)	Melling Racing	Ford
11	Bill Elliott	Junior Johnson & Associates	Ford
12	Jimmy Spencer	Bobby Allison Motorsports	Ford
14	Terry Labonte	Hagan Racing	Chevrolet
15	Geoff Bodine	Bud Moore Engineering	Ford
16	Wally Dallenbach Jr.	Roush Racing	Ford
17	Darrell Waltrip	Darrell Waltrip Motorsports	Chevrolet
18	Dale Jarrett	Joe Gibbs Racing	Chevrolet
20	Dirk Stephens	Craigen Racing	Ford
21	Morgan Shepherd	Wood Brothers Racing	Ford
22	Bobby Labonte (R)	Bill Davis Racing	Ford
24	Jeff Gordon (R)	Hendrick Motorsports	Chevrolet
25	Ken Schrader	Hendrick Motorsports	Chevrolet
26	Brett Bodine	King Racing	Ford
27	Hut Stricklin	Junior Johnson & Associates	Ford
28	Davey Allison	Robert Yates Racing	Ford
29	John Krebs	Diamond Ridge Motorsports	Chevrolet
30	Michael Waltrip	Bahari Racing	Pontiac
33	Harry Gant	Leo Jackson Motorsports	Chevrolet
36	Butch Gilliland	Gilliland Racing	Chevrolet
37	Rick Carelli	Chesrown Racing	Chevrolet
40	Kenny Wallace (R)	SABCO Racing	Pontiac
41	Phil Parsons	Larry Hedrick Motorsports	Chevrolet
42	Kyle Petty	SABCO Racing	Pontiac
44	Rick Wilson	Petty Enterprises	Pontiac
48	Jack Sellers	Emerson Racing	Chevrolet
50	Mike Chase	JTC Racing	Chevrolet
52	Scott Gaylord	Jimmy Means Racing	Pontiac
55	Ted Musgrave	RaDiUs Motorsports	Ford
56	Tony Hunt	Hunt Racing	Chevrolet
58	Wayne Jacks	Jacks Motorsports	Pontiac
68	Dorsey Schroeder	TriStar Motorsports	Ford
71	Dave Marcis	Marcis Auto Racing	Chevrolet
73	Bill Schmitt	Schmitt Racing	Ford
75	Dick Trickle	Butch Mock Motorsports	Ford
76	Bill Sedgwick	Spears Motorsports	Chevrolet
81	Jeff Davis	Jeff Davis Racing	Ford
90	Bobby Hillin Jr.	Donlavey Racing	Ford
98	Derrike Cope	Cale Yarborough Motorsports	Ford

== Qualifying ==
Qualifying was split into two rounds. The first round was held on Friday, May 14, at 6:30 PM EST. Each driver would have one lap to set a time. During the first round, the top 25 drivers in the round would be guaranteed a starting spot in the race. If a driver was not able to guarantee a spot in the first round, they had the option to scrub their time from the first round and try and run a faster lap time in a second round qualifying run, held on Saturday, May 15, at 1:00 PM EST. As with the first round, each driver would have one lap to set a time. For this specific race, positions 26-40 would be decided on time, and depending on who needed it, a select amount of positions were given to cars who had not otherwise qualified but were high enough in owner's points; which was one for cars in the NASCAR Winston Cup Series and two extra provisionals for the NASCAR Winston West Series. If needed, a past champion who did not qualify on either time or provisionals could use a champion's provisional, adding one more spot to the field.

Dale Earnhardt, driving for Richard Childress Racing, won the pole, setting a time of 1:38.783 and an average speed of 91.838 mph (147.799 km/h) in the first round.

Five drivers would fail to qualify.

=== Full qualifying results ===
Pos.	#	Driver	Team	Make	Time	Speed
1	3	Dale Earnhardt	Richard Childress Racing	Chevrolet	1:38.783	91.838
2	5	Ricky Rudd	Hendrick Motorsports	Chevrolet	1:39.081	91.561
3	15	Geoff Bodine	Bud Moore Engineering	Ford	1:39.170	91.479
4	4	Ernie Irvan	Morgan–McClure Motorsports	Chevrolet	1:39.398	91.269
5	6	Mark Martin	Roush Racing	Ford	1:39.569	91.113
6	2	Rusty Wallace	Penske Racing South	Pontiac	1:39.606	91.079
7	16	Wally Dallenbach Jr.	Roush Racing	Ford	1:39.617	91.069
8	25	Ken Schrader	Hendrick Motorsports	Chevrolet	1:39.782	90.918
9	28	Davey Allison	Robert Yates Racing	Ford	1:39.836	90.869
10	14	Terry Labonte	Hagan Racing	Chevrolet	1:39.902	90.809
11	98	Derrike Cope	Cale Yarborough Motorsports	Ford	1:40.206	90.533
12	21	Morgan Shepherd	Wood Brothers Racing	Ford	1:40.241	90.502
13	17	Darrell Waltrip	Darrell Waltrip Motorsports	Chevrolet	1:40.287	90.460
14	9	P. J. Jones (R)	Melling Racing	Ford	1:40.294	90.454
15	24	Jeff Gordon (R)	Hendrick Motorsports	Chevrolet	1:40.324	90.427
16	30	Michael Waltrip	Bahari Racing	Pontiac	1:40.328	90.423
17	11	Bill Elliott	Junior Johnson & Associates	Ford	1:40.453	90.311
18	42	Kyle Petty	SABCO Racing	Pontiac	1:40.512	90.258
19	68	Dorsey Schroeder	TriStar Motorsports	Ford	1:40.727	90.065
20	44	Rick Wilson	Petty Enterprises	Pontiac	1:40.810	89.991
21	40	Kenny Wallace (R)	SABCO Racing	Pontiac	1:40.940	89.875
22	12	Jimmy Spencer	Bobby Allison Motorsports	Ford	1:41.047	89.780
23	8	Sterling Marlin	Stavola Brothers Racing	Ford	1:41.057	89.771
24	55	Ted Musgrave	RaDiUs Motorsports	Ford	1:41.195	89.649
25	71	Dave Marcis	Marcis Auto Racing	Chevrolet	1:41.197	89.647
Failed to lock in Round 1
26	26	Brett Bodine	King Racing	Ford	1:40.814	89.987
27	36	Butch Gilliland	Gilliland Racing	Chevrolet	1:41.235	89.613
28	73	Bill Schmitt	Schmitt Racing	Ford	1:41.251	89.599
29	29	John Krebs	Diamond Ridge Motorsports	Chevrolet	1:41.266	89.586
30	90	Bobby Hillin Jr.	Donlavey Racing	Ford	1:41.274	89.579
31	1	Rick Mast	Precision Products Racing	Ford	1:41.291	89.564
32	18	Dale Jarrett	Joe Gibbs Racing	Chevrolet	1:41.349	89.512
33	7	Tommy Kendall	AK Racing	Ford	1:41.412	89.457
34	76	Bill Sedgwick	Spears Motorsports	Chevrolet	1:41.498	89.381
35	33	Harry Gant	Leo Jackson Motorsports	Chevrolet	1:41.949	88.986
36	27	Hut Stricklin	Junior Johnson & Associates	Ford	1:42.240	88.732
37	41	Phil Parsons	Larry Hedrick Motorsports	Chevrolet	1:42.441	88.558
38	75	Dick Trickle	Butch Mock Motorsports	Ford	1:42.737	88.303
39	20	Dirk Stephens	Craigen Racing	Ford	1:42.824	88.228
40	81	Jeff Davis	Jeff Davis Racing	Ford	1:42.840	88.215
Winston Cup provisional
41	22	Bobby Labonte (R)	Bill Davis Racing	Ford	-*	-*
Winston West provisionals
42	04	Hershel McGriff	TTC Motorsports	Chevrolet	-*	-*
43	37	Rick Carelli	Chesrown Racing	Chevrolet	-*	-*
Failed to qualify
44	50	Mike Chase	JTC Racing	Chevrolet	1:43.726	87.461
45	58	Wayne Jacks	Jacks Motorsports	Pontiac	1:43.948	87.274
46	56	Tony Hunt	Hunt Racing	Chevrolet	1:44.147	87.108
47	48	Jack Sellers	Emerson Racing	Chevrolet	1:48.978	83.246
48	52	Scott Gaylord	Jimmy Means Racing	Pontiac	-	-
Official first round qualifying results
Official starting lineup

== Race results ==
Fin	St	#	Driver	Team	Make	Laps	Led	Status	Pts	Winnings
1	3	15	Geoff Bodine	Bud Moore Engineering	Ford	74	30	running	180	$66,510
2	4	4	Ernie Irvan	Morgan–McClure Motorsports	Chevrolet	74	2	running	175	$41,190
3	2	5	Ricky Rudd	Hendrick Motorsports	Chevrolet	74	0	running	165	$29,590
4	8	25	Ken Schrader	Hendrick Motorsports	Chevrolet	74	0	running	160	$22,415
5	18	42	Kyle Petty	SABCO Racing	Pontiac	74	0	running	155	$22,715
6	1	3	Dale Earnhardt	Richard Childress Racing	Chevrolet	74	33	running	160	$27,790
7	7	16	Wally Dallenbach Jr.	Roush Racing	Ford	74	0	running	146	$17,465
8	20	44	Rick Wilson	Petty Enterprises	Pontiac	74	0	running	142	$13,665
9	10	14	Terry Labonte	Hagan Racing	Chevrolet	74	0	running	138	$17,015
10	36	27	Hut Stricklin	Junior Johnson & Associates	Ford	74	0	running	134	$17,415
11	15	24	Jeff Gordon (R)	Hendrick Motorsports	Chevrolet	74	0	running	130	$10,215
12	23	8	Sterling Marlin	Stavola Brothers Racing	Ford	74	2	running	132	$14,315
13	32	18	Dale Jarrett	Joe Gibbs Racing	Chevrolet	74	0	running	124	$16,610
14	12	21	Morgan Shepherd	Wood Brothers Racing	Ford	74	0	running	121	$13,310
15	9	28	Davey Allison	Robert Yates Racing	Ford	73	0	crash	118	$18,160
16	41	22	Bobby Labonte (R)	Bill Davis Racing	Ford	73	0	crash	115	$7,965
17	17	11	Bill Elliott	Junior Johnson & Associates	Ford	73	0	running	112	$17,590
18	11	98	Derrike Cope	Cale Yarborough Motorsports	Ford	73	0	running	109	$12,340
19	35	33	Harry Gant	Leo Jackson Motorsports	Chevrolet	73	0	running	106	$16,315
20	38	75	Dick Trickle	Butch Mock Motorsports	Ford	73	0	running	103	$7,840
21	43	37	Rick Carelli	Chesrown Racing	Chevrolet	73	0	running	100	$7,190
22	33	7	Tommy Kendall	AK Racing	Ford	73	0	running	97	$16,565
23	16	30	Michael Waltrip	Bahari Racing	Pontiac	73	6	running	99	$12,040
24	26	26	Brett Bodine	King Racing	Ford	73	0	running	91	$12,420
25	14	9	P. J. Jones (R)	Melling Racing	Ford	73	0	running	88	$8,810
26	34	76	Bill Sedgwick	Spears Motorsports	Chevrolet	73	0	running	85	$8,140
27	22	12	Jimmy Spencer	Bobby Allison Motorsports	Ford	73	0	running	82	$11,665
28	25	71	Dave Marcis	Marcis Auto Racing	Chevrolet	72	0	running	79	$8,540
29	31	1	Rick Mast	Precision Products Racing	Ford	72	0	running	76	$11,505
30	39	20	Dirk Stephens	Craigen Racing	Ford	72	0	running	73	$6,900
31	28	73	Bill Schmitt	Schmitt Racing	Ford	71	0	running	70	$6,815
32	27	36	Butch Gilliland	Gilliland Racing	Chevrolet	71	0	running	67	$6,765
33	19	68	Dorsey Schroeder	TriStar Motorsports	Ford	69	0	accident	64	$8,265
34	29	29	John Krebs	Diamond Ridge Motorsports	Chevrolet	68	0	transmission	61	$6,690
35	13	17	Darrell Waltrip	Darrell Waltrip Motorsports	Chevrolet	67	0	engine	58	$16,465
36	21	40	Kenny Wallace (R)	SABCO Racing	Pontiac	66	0	running	55	$6,665
37	37	41	Phil Parsons	Larry Hedrick Motorsports	Chevrolet	65	0	rear end	52	$8,160
38	6	2	Rusty Wallace	Penske Racing South	Pontiac	64	1	transmission	54	$15,615
39	24	55	Ted Musgrave	RaDiUs Motorsports	Ford	61	0	running	46	$11,085
40	5	6	Mark Martin	Roush Racing	Ford	57	0	rear end	43	$15,260
41	30	90	Bobby Hillin Jr.	Donlavey Racing	Ford	57	0	rear end	40	$6,560
42	40	81	Jeff Davis	Jeff Davis Racing	Ford	46	0	accident	37	$6,560
43	42	04	Hershel McGriff	TTC Motorsports	Chevrolet	27	0	engine	34	$6,560
Official race results

== Standings after the race ==
Drivers' Championship standings

	Pos	Driver	Points
1	1	Dale Earnhardt	1,526
1	2	Rusty Wallace	1,506 (-20)
	3	Davey Allison	1,408 (-118)
1	4	Kyle Petty	1,363 (–163)
2	5	Geoff Bodine	1,352 (–174)
2	6	Dale Jarrett	1,333 (–193)
1	7	Morgan Shepherd	1,287 (–239)
2	8	Ernie Irvan	1,275 (–251)
3	9	Mark Martin	1,234 (–292)
1	10	Jeff Gordon	1,207 (–319)
Official driver's standings

- Note: Only the first 10 positions are included for the driver standings.

Previous race: 1993 Winston 500	NASCAR Winston Cup Series; 1993 season	Next race: 1993 Coca-Cola 600

Previous race: 1993 Winston 200	NASCAR Winston West Series; 1993 season	Next race: 1993 Valvoline 200
