= 1991 NASCAR Winston West Series =

38th season of the NASCAR Winston West Series

Seasons
- ← 1990 1992 →

The 1991 NASCAR Winston West Series was the 38th season of the series. The title was won by Bill Sedgwick, his first in the series.

== Teams and drivers ==
=== Complete schedule ===
Manufacturer	Team	No.	Driver
Buick	Adele Emerson	44	Jack Sellers 7 (Note: Sellers ran the full season split between Adele Emerson's No. 44 and No. 8 entries.)
Buick	Adele Emerson	44	Chuck Welch 2
Buick	St. James Racing	22	St. James Davis
Chevrolet	Spears Motorsports	75	Bill Sedgwick
Chevrolet	Rick Scribner	15	Rick Scribner
Ford	Rouse Racing	91	Robert Sprague
Ford	Schmitt Racing	73	Bill Schmitt
Pontiac	Bob Lipseia	04	Hershel McGriff
Pontiac	Gilliland Racing	24	Butch Gilliland
Pontiac	Krebs Racing	99	John Krebs
Buick 8 Pontiac 1	Beebe Racing 8 Unknown 1	93	Billy Jac Shaw

=== Limited schedule ===
Manufacturer	Team	No.	Driver	Races
Buick	Adele Emerson	8	Chuck Welch	4
Buick	Adele Emerson	8	Jack Sellers	2
Buick	Don Freymiller	23	Mike Chase	6
Buick	Steurer Racing	18	Glen Steurer	1
Buick	Unknown	3	Archie Somers	1
Buick	Unknown	3	Don Waterman	1
Chevrolet	A. J. Foyt Enterprises	14	Mike Chase	2
Chevrolet	Benison Racing	86	Ron Hornaday Jr.	4
Chevrolet	Chesrown Racing	37	Rick Carelli	3
Chevrolet	Kieper Racing	98	Jim Bown	2
Chevrolet	McCray Racing	08	Rick McCray	1
Chevrolet	Reed Racing	72	Mark Reed	4
Chevrolet	Reno Racing	40	Joe Ruttman	1
Chevrolet	Scott Racing	27	Gary Scott	3
Chevrolet	Tidrick Racing	27	Gary Scott	1
Chevrolet	Tidrick Racing	72	Brad Tidrick	4
Chevrolet	Tim McCauley	0	Tim McCauley	2
Chevrolet	Tim McCauley	90	Tim McCauley	1
Chevrolet	Unknown	50	John Dillon	2
Chevrolet	Unknown	87	Mike Nicholson	2
Ford	Junior Johnson & Associates	11	Geoffrey Bodine	2
Ford	Junior Johnson & Associates	22	Sterling Marlin	3
Ford	Little Racing	19	Chad Little	3
Ford	Melling Racing	9	Bill Elliott	3
Ford	NorCal Motorsports	5	Jerry Bowers	2
Ford	Rouse Racing	9	J. C. Danielsen	4
Ford	Schmitt Racing	78	Ted Kennedy	1
Oldsmobile	Adele Emerson	34	Ted Kennedy	1
Oldsmobile	Collins Motorsports	28	Gary Collins	3
Oldsmobile	French Racing	14	Mike French	1
Oldsmobile	Geoff Burney	00	Scott Gaylord	4
Oldsmobile	Jacks Racing	58	Wayne Jacks	2
Oldsmobile	Jacks Racing	93	Wayne Jacks	2
Oldsmobile	Jacks Racing	97	Wayne Jacks	1
Oldsmobile	Larry Gaylord	68	Larry Gaylord	4
Oldsmobile	Oldsmobile Motorsports	89	Bob Howard	2
Oldsmobile	S&S Racing	05	Randy Becker	1
Pontiac	Adele Emerson	36	Rick Mackey	1
Pontiac	Bob Walker Racing	88	Bob Walker	3
Pontiac	Eaton Racing	7	Ron Eaton	3
Pontiac	Farrell Racing	96	Bruce Nutt	1
Pontiac	Gunselman Racing	60	Larry Gunselman	1
Pontiac	Gunselman Motorsports	60	Larry Gunselman	2
Pontiac	Krebs Racing	96	Mark Moore	2
Pontiac	Krebs Racing	96	Jim Courage	1
Pontiac	Krebs Racing	96	Dave Gengenbach	1
Pontiac	Midgley Racing	09	Terry Fisher	2
Pontiac	Midgley Racing	09	R. K. Smith	2
Pontiac	Midgley Racing	09	Jon Paques	1
Pontiac	Midgley Racing	09	Dirk Stephens	1
Pontiac	Rick Mackey	33	Rick Mackey	1
Pontiac	Unknown	05	Ron Esau	1
Oldsmobile 2 Chevrolet 1	Esau Racing	56	Ron Esau	3

== Schedule and results ==
The 1991 season included 9 individual races, although Evergreen Speedway and Mesa Marin Raceway hosted two races each. The races at Sears Point International Raceway and Phoenix International Raceway were in combination with the NASCAR Winston Cup Series.

Date	Name	Racetrack	Location	Winner
May 4	Winston 300	Evergreen Speedway	Monroe, Washington	Mike Chase
May 19	California 400	Mesa Marin Raceway	Bakersfield, California	Mike Chase
June 9	Banquet Frozen Foods 300	Sears Point International Raceway	Sonoma, California	Davey Allison
June 15	Winston 200	Saugus Speedway	Saugus, California	Bill Schmitt
June 30	Winston 200	Portland Speedway	Portland, Oregon	Mike Chase
July 14	Motorcraft 500	Evergreen Speedway	Monroe, Washington	Geoffrey Bodine
August 3	Uhlmann Motors 200	South Sound Speedway	Olympia, Washington	Bill Schmitt
October 13	Winston 400	Mesa Marin Raceway	Bakersfield, California	Bill Sedgwick
November 3	Pyroil 500	Phoenix International Raceway	Avondale, Arizona	Davey Allison

=== Winston 300 ===
The Winston 300 was held on May 4 at Evergreen Speedway. Bill Schmitt won the pole.

Top Ten Results

1. 23 - Mike Chase
2. 75 - Bill Sedgwick -1
3. 24 - Butch Gilliland -2
4. 99 - John Krebs -3
5. 09 - Terry Fisher -4
6. 60 - Larry Gunselman -6
7. 15 - Rick Scribner -11
8. 93 - Billy Jac Shaw -11
9. 44 - Jack Sellers -32
10. 22 - St. James Davis -45
- Mike Chase started the season with a win, leading 158 of the 300 laps and lapping the field en route to his second career win.

=== California 400 ===
The California 400 was held on May 19 at Mesa Marin Raceway. Butch Gilliland won the pole.

Top Ten Results

1. 23 - Mike Chase
2. 88 - Bob Walker -1
3. 04 - Hershel McGriff -1
4. 24 - Butch Gilliland -2
5. 28 - Gary Collins -2
6. 9 - J. C. Danielsen -4
7. 99 - John Krebs -5
8. 73 - Bill Schmitt -9
9. 00 - Scott Gaylord -10
10. 15 - Rick Scribner -13
- For the second race in a row, Mike Chase led the most laps, lapped the field, and won. He extended his points lead over Butch Gilliland to 40 points.

=== Banquet Frozen Foods 300 ===
The Banquet Frozen Foods 300 was held on June 9 at Sears Point International Raceway and was the first of two combination races with the NASCAR Winston Cup Series. Ricky Rudd won the pole.

Top Ten Results

1. 28 - Davey Allison
2. 5 - Ricky Rudd
3. 2 - Rusty Wallace
4. 4 - Ernie Irvan
5. 25 - Ken Schrader
6. 94 - Terry Labonte
7. 3 - Dale Earnhardt
8. 97 - Geoff Bodine
9. 6 - Mark Martin
10. 30 - Michael Waltrip

Failed to qualify: 29 - Butch Gilliland, 44 - Jack Sellers, 93 - Troy Beebe, 20 - Kim Campbell, 05 - Ron Esau, 07 - Bobby Woods, 9 - J.C. Danielsen, 15 - Rick Scribner, 22 - St. James Davis, 36 - Billy Jac Shaw, 72 - Mark Reed

- A wild finish ended in controversy. Accomplished Trans-Am champion and NASCAR road course ringer Tommy Kendall (substituting for the injured Kyle Petty) was leading Mark Martin with 4 laps to go, in Felix Sabates' #42 Pontiac. Going into the turn 7 hairpin, Martin slid by on the outside, but the cars made contact, and Martin spun out. Kendall suffered a flat tire, and limped back to the pits. With 2 laps remaining, Davey Allison who had been running third took the lead. Allison led Ricky Rudd into turn 11 as the cars were anticipating seeing the white flag. Rudd's nose got inside, touched Allison's rear bumper, and Allison spun out with the white flag waving. Allison refired, and got back on to the track to hold on to second position. The next time by, Ricky Rudd was displayed the black flag and penalized 5 seconds for "dirty driving." Allison, the second car in line, was given the checkered flag and declared the winner. Rudd officially dropped back to 2nd place, with the black flag being reduced to a 5-second penalty following Allison's time of victory. After the race, Dave Marcis, a lapped car who was right behind the incident and saw it unfold, claimed that Rudd's tap was not dirty, and in his opinion was simply drivers racing hard on the final lap.
- Bill Schmitt was the highest finishing West Series driver in the race, coming home an impressive 13th among the Cup field.
- Mike Chase, who finished 40th overall and 7th of the 8 West drivers who made the field, maintained the points lead over Butch Gilliland, who failed to make the race.

=== Winston 200 (Saugus) ===
The Winston 200 was held on June 15 at Saugus Speedway. Bill Sedgwick won the pole.

Top Ten Results

1. 73 - Bill Schmitt
2. 75 - Bill Sedgwick
3. 24 - Butch Gilliland -1
4. 04 - Hershel McGriff -1
5. 93 - Wayne Jacks -2
6. 88 - Bob Walker -2
7. 91 - Robert Sprague -2
8. 05 - Randy Becker -2
9. 98 - Billy Jac Shaw -5
10. 15 - Rick Scribner -8
- Bill Schmitt scored his first win of the season, leading 101 of 200 laps and beating polesitter Bill Sedgwick by 6.5 seconds. Sedgwick, who was the only other car on the lead laps, moved into the points lead, 4 points ahead of Mike Chase and 14 points ahead of Schmitt.

=== Winston 200 (Portland) ===
The Winston 200 was held on June 30 at Portland Speedway. Jim Bown won the pole.

Top Ten Results

1. 23 - Mike Chase
2. 73 - Bill Schmitt
3. 75 - Bill Sedgwick -1
4. 91 - Robert Sprague -1
5. 24 - Butch Gilliland -1
6. 50 - John Dillon -1
7. 3 - Don Waterman -2
8. 04 - Hershel McGriff -2
9. 99 - John Krebs -3
10. 09 - Terry Fisher -4
- Mike Chase scored his third and final win of the season, beating Bill Schmitt by 1 second. Polesitter Jim Bown failed to finish the event, falling out with steering problems.
- Chase regained the points lead, but the battle remained close, as he was only 10 points ahead of Schmitt and 11 ahead of Bill Sedgwick after the race.

=== Motorcraft 500 ===
The Motorcraft 500 was held on July 14 at Evergreen Speedway. Winston Cup driver Sterling Marlin won the pole.

Top Ten Results

1. 11 - Geoffrey Bodine
2. 98 - Jim Bown
3. 75 - Bill Sedgwick -1
4. 09 - Jon Paques -5
5. 93 - Billy Jac Shaw -8
6. 5 - Jerry Bowers -9
7. 15 - Rick Scribner -17
8. 72 - Brad Tidrick -19
9. 14 - Mike French -28
10. 04 - Hershel McGriff -46
- In his first and only West Series start, Geoff Bodine would lead for 378 of the race's 500 laps and score the win. Polesitter Sterling Marlin failed to finish after crashing out, as did points leader Mike Chase.
- After crashing out on the opening lap and finishing 35th, Chase would drop to third in the standings; Bill Sedgwick moved to the points lead, 49 points ahead of Bill Schmitt.

=== Uhlmann Motors 200 ===
The Uhlmann Motors 200 was held on August 3 at South Sound Speedway.Bill Schmitt won the pole.

Top Ten Results

1. 73 - Bill Schmitt
2. 75 - Bill Sedgwick
3. 24 - Butch Gilliland
4. 04 - Hershel McGriff -2
5. 91 - Robert Sprague -2
6. 09 - Dirk Stephens -4
7. 5 - Jerry Bowers -4
8. 93 - Billy Jac Shaw -4
9. 72 - Brad Tidrick -6
10. 99 - John Krebs -7
- Bill Schmitt led 183 of 200 laps and scored his second and final win of the season. In doing so, he cut the gap in the standings down to 34 points with just two races remaining.

=== Winston 400 ===
The Winston 400 was held on October 13 at Mesa Marin Raceway. Bill Sedgwick won the pole, nearly setting a lap record.

Top Ten Results

1. 75 - Bill Sedgwick
2. 37 - Rick Carelli
3. 73 - Bill Schmitt -1
4. 24 - Butch Gilliland -2
5. 40 - Joe Ruttman -4
6. 04 - Hershel McGriff -5
7. 15 - Rick Scribner -7
8. 93 - Billy Jac Shaw -9
9. 58 - Wayne Jacks -12
10. 99 - John Krebs -12
- Bill Sedgwick dominated the race, leading 315 of the race's 400 laps en route to his first and only win of the season. He expanded his points lead to 49 points with one race remaining.

=== Pyroil 500 ===
The Pyroil 500 was held on November 3 at Phoenix International Raceway and was the second of two combination races with the NASCAR Winston Cup Series. Geoffrey Bodine won the pole.

Top Ten Results

1. 28 - Davey Allison
2. 17 - Darrell Waltrip
3. 22 - Sterling Marlin
4. 7 - Alan Kulwicki
5. 2 - Rusty Wallace
6. 4 - Ernie Irvan
7. 98 - Jimmy Spencer -1
8. 11 - Geoff Bodine -1
9. 3 - Dale Earnhardt -1
10. 15 - Morgan Shepherd -1

Failed to qualify: 93 -Troy Beebe, 44 - Jack Sellers, 89 - Jim Sauter, 00 - Scott Gaylord, 09 - R. K. Smith, 15 - Rick Scribner, 22 - St. James Davis, 37 - Rick Carelli, 58 - Wayne Jacks, 86 - Ron Hornaday Jr., 91 - Robert Sprague, 97 - Billy Jac Shaw, 99 - John Krebs

- This race the only time that Davey Allison would score back-to-back wins in his career, as he had also won the previous Cup race, the AC Delco 500.
- Bill Sedgwick would be the highest running West driver, finishing the race 21st overall and scoring points equivalent to a win. Bill Schmitt would crash out of the race after 136 laps and finished 37th. Sedgwick was able to secure the title, 74 points ahead of Schmitt.

== Full Drivers' Championship ==
(key) Bold – Pole position awarded by time. Italics – Pole position set by owner's points. * – Most laps led. † – Ineligible for West Series points

Pos	Driver	EVG	MMR	SON	SGS	POR	EVG	SSS	MMR	PHO	Pts
1	Bill Sedgwick	2	13	15	**2**	3	3	2	**1***	21	1509
2	Bill Schmitt	**15**	8	13	1*	2	16	**1***	3	37	1435
3	Butch Gilliland	3	**4**	DNQ	3	5	11	3	4	29	1413
4	Hershel McGriff	22	3	32	4	8	10	4	6	27	1353
5	John Krebs	4	7	38	11	9	17	10	10	DNQ	1259
6	Rick Scribner	7	10	DNQ	10	11	7	11	7	DNQ	1211
7	Billy Jac Shaw	8	17	DNQ	9	14	5	8	8	DNQ	1187
8	Robert Sprague	24	18	39	7	4	13	5	18	DNQ	1173
9	Mike Chase	1*	1*	40	13	1	35		13	26	1172
10	Jack Sellers	9	11	DNQ	14	17	14	13	12	DNQ	1106
11	St. James Davis	10	15	DNQ	12	16	26	17	15	DNQ	1042
12	Chuck Welch	20	16		16	13	21		19		663
13	Wayne Jacks		14		5		34		9	DNQ	592
14	Scott Gaylord	19	9	33						DNQ	531
15	Brad Tidrick	16				18	8	9			504
16	J.C. Danielsen	21	6	DNQ	18						489
17	Mark Reed		24	DNQ					14	34	479
18	Ron Hornaday Jr.		22				18		20	DNQ	451
19	Ron Esau		20	DNQ			22		16		447
20	Larry Gaylord	12				15	29	15			439
21	Gary Scott	11				19	28	14			436
22	Gary Collins		5						17	42	418
23	Bob Walker		2		6		25				408
24	Rick Carelli						27		2	DNQ	391
25	Tim McCauley	13	21		17						336
26	Ron Eaton	18					23	16			318
27	Larry Gunselman	6	19				36				311
28	Jim Bown					12	2				302
29	Jerry Bowers						6	7			296
30	Terry Fisher	5				10					294
31	R. K. Smith			43						DNQ	248
32	Rick Mackey		12		15						245
33	Mike Nicholson							12	22		224
34	Archie Somers	17									221
35	John Dillon					6	31				220
36	Mark Moore	14	23								215
37	Bob Howard	23					15				212
38	Ted Kennedy						33		11		194
39	Geoffrey Bodine			8†			1*			**8†**	185
40	Jon Paques						4				160
41	Joe Ruttman			31†					5	22†	155
42	Dirk Stephens							6			150
43	Don Waterman					7					146
44	Randy Becker				8						142
45	Troy Beebe			DNQ						DNQ	138
46	Mike French						9				138
47	Bobby Woods										134
48	Bill Elliott			20†			12			25†	127
49	Sterling Marlin			26†			**19**			3†	111
50	Jim Courage					20					103
51	Rick McCray						20				103
52	Bruce Nutt								21		100
53	Chad Little			28†			24			30†	96
54	Glen Steurer						30				73
55	Dave Gengenbach						32				67

== See also ==
- 1991 NASCAR Winston Cup Series
- 1991 NASCAR Busch Series
