= Ron Esau =

American racing driver (1954–2022)

- Born: October 9, 1954; Lakeside, California, U.S.
- Died: January 24, 2022 (aged 67)
- Awards: West Coast Stock Car Hall of Fame (2022)

NASCAR Cup Series career
- 17 races run over 10 years
- Best finish: 62nd (1984)
- First race: 1975 Winston Western 500 Riverside
- Last race: 1990 Miller Genuine Draft 400 (Richmond)
Wins	Top tens	Poles
0	0	0

NASCAR FedEx Freight Truck Series career
- 6 races run over 2 years
- Best finish: 43rd (1995)
- First race: 1995 Jerr Dan / Nelson 150 (Evergreen)
- Last race: 1997 Carquest Auto Parts 420K (Las Vegas)
Wins	Top tens	Poles
0	1	0

Ronald Richard Esau (October 9, 1954 – January 24, 2022) was an American NASCAR Winston Cup Series driver who competed from 1975 to 1990.

== Career ==
The primary vehicle for this driver was the No. 56 Marc Reno-owned Gear Vendor Chevrolet. He completed 1,704 laps - the equivalent of 3,425.5 miles (5,512.8 km) of racing - while picking up eight DNQs in the process. Esau started in an average of 31st place and finished in an average of 30th place; keeping him near the rear of the average racing grid. His total career earnings are $44,290.

Even though he acquired a 17-race winless streak throughout his entire career as a NASCAR driver, Esau climbed as high in the championship rankings to 62nd place in the 1984 NASCAR Winston Cup Series season in addition to falling as low as 114th place in the 1986 NASCAR Winston Cup Series championship standings.

In February 1988, Esau drove in the first ever NASCAR sanctioned stock car race held outside of North America when he was one of 32 starters in the Goodyear NASCAR 500 held at the Calder Park Thunderdome in Melbourne, Australia. Driving in place of the critically injured Jim Robinson with all proceeds (including Esau's driving fee) going to the Jim Robinson Fund to help with medical bills, Esau's Oldsmobile Delta 88 started fifth, qualifying at 138.200 mph. For the first half of the race, Esau was able to avoid the predicted wrecks and was among the leaders, swapping the lead many times with regular Winston Cup stars Neil Bonnett and Bobby Allison. However his race was over on lap 160 of 280 with engine failure. He returned to the track for the 1988 NASCAR Christmas 500, where he finished ninth. He again competed at Calder Park for the final running of the event, the 1990 NASCAR Christmas 400, where he finished third behind Terry Labonte and Ken Schrader in a rain-shortened race.

From 2013 until his death, Esau operated a racing team in the independent circuits of stock cars that feature the old V8 engines that are rarely used in major league motorsports anymore.

== Personal life and death ==
Esau was married to Marsha; they had one son. He worked as a mentor to young stock car drivers like Brandon Whitt and Brendan Gaughan. Occasional jobs that Esau did after his NASCAR career include stints as the head driving instructor for Drivetech Racing School and doing fundraisers for people with various handicaps. Esau died on January 24, 2022, at the age of 67.

== Motorsports career results ==
=== NASCAR ===
(key) (Bold – Pole position awarded by qualifying time. Italics – Pole position earned by points standings or practice time. * – Most laps led.)

==== Winston Cup Series ====
NASCAR Winston Cup Series results
Year	Team	No.	Make	1	2	3	4	5	6	7	8	9	10	11	12	13	14	15	16	17	18	19	20	21	22	23	24	25	26	27	28	29	30	NWCC	Pts	Ref
1975	Kord Racing	94W	Chevy	RSD; 22	DAY	RCH	CAR	BRI	ATL	NWS	DAR	MAR	TAL	NSV	DOV	CLT	RSD	MCH	DAY	NSV	POC	TAL	MCH	DAR	DOV	NWS	MAR	CLT	RCH	CAR	BRI	ATL	ONT	92nd	97	
1976	Esau Racing	20	Chevy	RSD; 14	DAY	CAR	RCH	BRI	ATL	NWS	DAR	MAR	TAL	NSV	DOV	CLT																		78th	179	
1976	Esau Racing	20	Ford														RSD; 35	MCH	DAY	NSV	POC	TAL	MCH	BRI	DAR	RCH	DOV	MAR	NWS	CLT	CAR	ATL	ONT; DNQ	78th	179	
1977	Esau Racing	20	Ford	RSD; DNQ	DAY	RCH	CAR	ATL	NWS	DAR	BRI	MAR	TAL	NSV	DOV	CLT	RSD	MCH	DAY	NSV	POC	TAL	MCH	BRI	DAR	RCH	DOV	MAR	NWS	CLT	CAR	ATL	ONT	NA	-	
1983	Lee Racing	66	Buick	DAY	RCH	CAR	ATL	DAR	NWS	MAR	TAL	NSV	DOV	BRI	CLT	RSD; 35	POC	MCH	DAY	NSV	POC	TAL	MCH	BRI	DAR	RCH	DOV	MAR	NWS	CLT	CAR	ATL	RSD; 38	83rd	107	
1984	Lee Racing	56	Buick	DAY	RCH	CAR	ATL	BRI	NWS	DAR	MAR	TAL	NSV	DOV	CLT	RSD; 27	POC	MCH	DAY	NSV	POC	TAL	MCH	BRI	DAR	RCH	DOV	MAR	CLT	NWS	CAR	ATL	RSD; 27	62nd	164	
1985	Stoke Racing	98		DAY	RCH	CAR	ATL	BRI	DAR	NWS	MAR	TAL	DOV	CLT	RSD	POC	MCH	DAY	POC	TAL	MCH	BRI	DAR	RCH	DOV	MAR	NWS	CLT	CAR	ATL; DNQ				100th	40	
1985	Hylton Motorsports	49	Chevy																												RSD; 41			100th	40	
1986	Hylton Motorsports	48	Chevy	DAY; DNQ	RCH; QL^{†}	CAR	ATL	BRI	DAR	NWS	MAR	TAL	DOV	CLT	RSD; 16	POC	MCH	DAY	POC	TAL	GLN	MCH	BRI	DAR	RCH	DOV	MAR	NWS	CLT	CAR	ATL			113th	64	
1986	Branch-Ragan Racing	48	Chevy																													RSD; 33		113th	64	
1987	U.S. Racing	6	Chevy	DAY	CAR	RCH	ATL	DAR	NWS	BRI	MAR	TAL	CLT	DOV	POC	RSD; 22	MCH	DAY	POC	TAL	GLN	MCH	BRI	DAR	RCH	DOV	MAR	NWS	CLT	CAR	RSD	ATL		107th	-	
1988	Arrington Racing	67	Buick	DAY	RCH	CAR	ATL	DAR	BRI	NWS	MAR	TAL	CLT	DOV	RSD; DNQ	POC	MCH	DAY																69th	100	
1988	Arrington Racing	67	Ford																POC; DNQ			MCH; DNQ	BRI	DAR	RCH; DNQ	DOV	MAR	CLT	NWS	CAR	PHO	ATL		69th	100	
1988	Arrington Racing	67	Chevy																	TAL; 36														69th	100	
1988	Arrington Racing	67	Olds																		GLN; 21													69th	100	
1989	TriStar Motorsports	18	Pontiac	DAY	CAR	ATL	RCH	DAR	BRI	NWS	MAR	TAL; 38	CLT	DOV																				71st	-	
1989	Esau Racing	56	Olds												SON; 41	POC	MCH	DAY	POC	TAL	GLN	MCH	BRI	DAR	RCH	DOV	MAR	CLT	NWS	CAR				71st	-	
1989	Douglas Smith	62	Olds																												PHO; 35	ATL		71st	-	
1990	Reno Enterprises	56	Chevy	DAY	RCH	CAR	ATL	DAR	BRI	NWS	MAR	TAL	CLT	DOV	SON	POC	MCH	DAY	POC	TAL	GLN	MCH	BRI	DAR	RCH; 25	DOV								80th	88	
1990	U.S. Racing	2	Pontiac																								MAR; DNQ	NWS; DNQ	CLT	CAR				80th	88	
1990	Esau Racing	56	Buick																												PHO; DNQ	ATL		80th	88	
^{†} - Qualified but replaced by Eddie Bierschwale

===== Daytona 500 =====
Year	Team	Manufacturer	Start	Finish
1986	Hylton Motorsports	Chevrolet	DNQ	

==== Craftsman Truck Series ====
NASCAR Craftsman Truck Series results
Year	Team	No.	Make	1	2	3	4	5	6	7	8	9	10	11	12	13	14	15	16	17	18	19	20	21	22	23	24	25	26	NCTSC	Pts	Ref
1995	Ken Schrader Racing	52	Chevy	PHO	TUS	SGS	MMR	POR	EVG; 9																					43rd	427	
1995	Walker Evans Racing	26	Dodge							I70; 26	LVL	BRI																		43rd	427	
1995	Walker Evans Racing	28	Dodge										MLW; 29	CNS	HPT	IRP	FLM	RCH	MAR	NWS	SON									43rd	427	
1995	Bunce Engineering	63	Chevy																			MMR; 20	PHO; DNQ							43rd	427	
1997	Bunce Engineering	9	Chevy	WDW	TUS	HOM	PHO	POR	EVG	I70	NHA	TEX	BRI	NZH	MLW	LVL	CNS	HPT	IRP	FLM	NSV	GLN	RCH	MAR	SON	MMR; 20	CAL; DNQ	PHO	LVS; 22	73rd	249	

==== Winston West Series ====
NASCAR Winston West Series results
Year	Team	No.	Make	1	2	3	4	5	6	7	8	9	10	11	12	13	14	15	16	17	18	19	20	Pos.	Pts	Ref
1975	Kord Racing	94	Chevy	RSD; 22	LAG	MSP	ASP	RSD																NA	151	
1975	Esau Racing	20	Chevy						ASP; 14	USP	POR	EVG	SMS	CRS	CSP	ASP; 10	EVG	YAK	POR	MSP	ONT			NA	151	
1976	Esau Racing	20	Chevy	RSD; 14																				NA	0	
1976	Esau Racing	20	Ford		RSD; 35	EVG	WSP	USP	POR	SHA	SGS	EVG	YAK	POR	LAG	ONT; DNQ								NA	0	
1977	Esau Racing	11	Chevy	RSD	LAG	ONT; 20	SJS	MMR	ASP	RSD	SGS	YAK	EVG	WSP	USP	POR	AAS	CRS	ASP	SHA	POR	ONT	PHO	44th	152.25	
1979	Esau Racing	20	Pontiac	RSD	**MMR**; 20	RSD	EVG	YAK	POR	AAS	SHA	CRS	SON; 15	EVG	SRP	POR	ASP	ONT	PHO; 12					32nd	106	
1980	Midgley Racing	29	Pontiac	RSD	ONT	S99	RSD	LAG	EVG	POR	SON; 25	MMR	ONT											NA	26	
1980	Esau Racing	15	Pontiac											PHO; 26										NA	26	
1982	Lee Racing	66	Buick	MMR	S99	AAS	RSD	POR	WSP	SHA	EVG	SON	CDR	RSD	RSD	PHO; 17								NA	34	
1983	Lee Racing	66	Buick	S99; 12	SON; 4	RSD; 35	YAK; 9	EVG; 7	SHA; 3	RSD; 21	CPL; 19	RSD; 38	PHO; 9											9th	401	
1984	Lee Racing	56	Buick	RSD; 27	YAK; 3	SIR; 6	POR; 6	EVG; 4	SHA; 7	WSR; 2	SON; 19	**MMR**; 3	RSD; 27	PHO; 5										5th	492	
1985	Hylton Motorsports	49	Chevy	SON	SHA	RSD	MMR	SIR	POR	STA	YAK	EVG	WSR	MMR	RSD; 41									45th	37	
1986	Hylton Motorsports	48	Chevy	SON	RSD; 16	EVG	RCS	TAC	PIR	WSR														NA	47	
1986	Branch-Ragan Racing	48	Chevy								RSD; 33													NA	47	
1987	U.S. Racing	6	Chevy	SON	RSD; 22	SGP																		47th	23	
1987	Schmitt Racing	70	Chevy				EVG; 28	POR	TAC	MMR	RSD													47th	23	
1988		78	Olds	SON; 20																				17th	183	
1988	Hylton Motorsports	48	Buick		**MMR**; 15				EVG; 6	MMR	PHO													17th	183	
1988	Arrington Racing	67	Buick			RSD; DNQ	SGP	POR																17th	183	
1989	Esau Racing	56	Olds	MAD; 16	MMR	RAS	SON; 41	POR	TCR	EVG	MMR; 7	SGS	SON											18th	565	
1989	Douglas Smith	62	Olds											PHO; 35										18th	565	
1990	Esau Racing	56	Buick	MMR	SON	SGS	POR	EVG	RAS	TCR	MMR	PHO; DNQ												37th	138	
1991	Esau Racing	56	Olds	EVG	MMR; 20						MMR; 16	PHO												19th	447	
1991		05	Pontiac			SON; DNQ	SGS	POR																19th	447	
1991	Esau Racing	56	Chevy						EVG; 22	SSS														19th	447	
1993	Spears Motorsports	75	Chevy	TWS; 7	MMR	SGS	SON	TUS	SHA	EVG	POR	CBS	SSS	CAJ	TCR	MMR	PHO							38th	165	
1994	Esau Racing	26	Olds	MMR	TUS	SON	SGS	YAK	MMR	POR	IND	CAJ	TCR	LVS	MMR	PHO	TUS; 2							42nd	175	
1995	Esau Racing	56	Olds	TUS; 7	MMR	SON	CNS	MMR	POR	SGS	TUS	AMP	MAD	POR	LVS	SON	MMR	PHO						47th	146	
1997		3	Chevy	TUS; 13	AMP	SON	TUS	MMR	LVS															40th	274	
1997	Dave Reed	2	Chevy							CAL; 6	EVG	POR	PPR	AMP	SON	MMR	LVS							40th	274	
1998	Quick Pick Motorsports	43	Chevy	TUS	LVS	PHO	CAL; 35	HPT	MMR	AMP	POR	CAL; 29	PPR	EVG	SON	MMR	LVS							67th	134	

=== ARCA Hooters SuperCar Series ===
(key) (Bold – Pole position awarded by qualifying time. Italics – Pole position earned by points standings or practice time. * – Most laps led.)

ARCA Hooters SuperCar Series results
Year	Team	No.	Make	1	2	3	4	5	6	7	8	9	10	11	12	13	14	15	16	17	18	19	20	21	AHSSC	Pts	Ref
1992		26	Olds	DAY	FIF	TWS; 6	TAL	TOL	KIL	POC	MCH	FRS	KIL	NSH	DEL	POC	HPT; 30	FRS	ISF	TOL	DSF	TWS; DNQ	SLM	ATL	87th	-	
1993	Spears Motorsports	75W	Chevy	DAY	FIF	TWS; 7	TAL	KIL	CMS	FRS	TOL	POC	MCH	FRS	POC	KIL	ISF	DSF	TOL	SLM	WIN	ATL			NA	0	

Sporting positions
Preceded by Inaugural	NASCAR Featherlite Southwest Tour Champion; 1986	Succeeded by Mike Chase
