= 1991 California 400 =

2nd race of the 1991 NASCAR Winston West Series

Race details
- Race 2 of 9 in the 1991 NASCAR Winston West Series season
- Date: May 19, 1991
- Location: Mesa Marin Speedway in Bakersfield, California
- Course: Permanent racing facility
- Course length: 0.500 miles (0.805 km)
- Distance: 400 laps, 200.00 mi (321.86 km)
- Average speed: 71.863 miles per hour (115.652 km/h)

Pole position
Driver	Butch Gilliland	Gilliland Racing

Most laps led
Driver	Mike Chase	Freymiller Racing
- Laps: 284

Winner
No. 23	Mike Chase	Freymiller Racing

Television in the United States
- Network: TNN
- Announcers: Bill Hennecy, Randy Hamill

The 1991 California 400 was the second race of the 1991 NASCAR Winston West Series season. The race was held on Sunday, May 19, 1991, at Mesa Marin Raceway, a 0.500 mile (0.805 km) oval shaped racetrack in Bakersfield, California. The race took the scheduled 400 laps to complete. The race was won by Mike Chase, his second win of the season and second in a row. Chase would win the race by a lap after trading the lead with Gary Collins and Bill Schmitt three times, taking the lead from Collins on lap 265. Bob Walker would finish second, Hershel McGriff finished third, Butch Gilliland finished fourth, and Collins fell back to finish fifth.

== Report ==
=== Background ===
Mesa Marin Raceway was a 0.500 mi (0.805 km) paved oval race track, located near the junction of CA 178 and CA 184 (Kern Canyon Road), east of Bakersfield, California. It opened in 1977 and was owned by Marion Collins throughout its existence. The 1991 California 400 was one of 45 NASCAR Winston West Series races to be held at the track during its existence.

==== Entry list ====
#	Driver	Owner	Manufacturer
0	Tim McCauley	Tim McCauley	Chevrolet
00	Scott Gaylord	Geoff Burney	Oldsmobile
04	Hershel McGriff	Bob Lipseia	Pontiac
8	Chuck Welch	Adele Emerson	Buick
9	J. C. Danielsen	Larry Rouse	Ford
15	Rick Scribner	Rick Scribner	Chevrolet
22	St. James Davis	LaDonna Davis	Buick
23	Mike Chase	Don Freymiller	Buick
24	Butch Gilliland	Butch Gilliland	Pontiac
28	Gary Collins	Marion Collins	Oldsmobile
33	Rick Mackey	Rick Mackey	Pontiac
44	Jack Sellers	Adele Emerson	Buick
56	Ron Esau	Ron Esau	Oldsmobile
60	Larry Gunselman	Larry Gunselman	Pontiac
72	Mark Reed	James Reed	Chevrolet
73	Bill Schmitt	Bill Schmitt	Ford
75	Bill Sedgwick	Wayne Spears	Chevrolet
86	Ron Hornaday Jr.	Jim Benison	Chevrolet
88	Bob Walker	Bob Walker	Pontiac
91	Robert Sprague	Larry Rouse	Ford
93	Wayne Jacks	Wayne Jacks	Oldsmobile
96	Mark Moore	John Krebs	Pontiac
98	Billy Jac Shaw	Allen Beebe	Buick
99	John Krebs	John Krebs	Pontiac

== Qualifying ==
Butch Gilliland won the pole with a speed of 92.975 mph.

== Race results ==
Fin	St	#	Driver	Owner	Make	Laps	Led	Status	Pts
1	5	23	Mike Chase	Don Freymiller	Buick	400	284	Running	185
2	24	88	Bob Walker	Bob Walker	Pontiac	399	0	Running	170
3	7	04	Hershel McGriff	Bob Lipseia	Pontiac	399	0	Running	165
4	1	24	Butch Gilliland	Butch Gilliland	Pontiac	398	0	Running	160
5	3	28	Gary Collins	Marion Collins	Oldsmobile	398	36	Running	160
6	10	9	J. C. Danielsen	Larry Rouse	Ford	396	0	Running	150
7	12	99	John Krebs	John Krebs	Pontiac	395	24	Running	151
8	6	73	Bill Schmitt	Bill Schmitt	Ford	391	22	Running	147
9	11	00	Scott Gaylord	Geoff Burney	Oldsmobile	390	0	Running	138
10	16	15	Rick Scribner	Rick Scribner	Chevrolet	387	0	Running	134
11	17	44	Jack Sellers	Adele Emerson	Buick	379	0	Running	130
12	23	33	Rick Mackey	Rick Mackey	Pontiac	377	0	Running	127
13	2	75	Bill Sedgwick	Wayne Spears	Chevrolet	364	5	Running	129
14	20	93	Wayne Jacks	Wayne Jacks	Oldsmobile	337	0	Running	121
15	19	22	St. James Davis	LaDonna Davis	Buick	309	0	Running	118
16	22	8	Chuck Welch	Adele Emerson	Buick	295	0	Running	115
17	15	98	Billy Jac Shaw	Allen Beebe	Buick	265	0	Accident	112
18	8	91	Robert Sprague	Larry Rouse	Ford	232	0	Engine	109
19	14	60	Larry Gunselman	Larry Gunselman	Pontiac	197	0	Engine	106
20	4	56	Ron Esau	Ron Esau	Oldsmobile	181	29	Accident	108
21	18	0	Tim McCauley	Tim McCauley	Chevrolet	160	0	Accident	100
22	13	86	Ron Hornaday Jr.	Jim Benison	Chevrolet	152	0	Engine	97
23	21	96	Mark Moore	John Krebs	Pontiac	136	0	Suspension	94
24	9	72	Mark Reed	James Reed	Chevrolet	116	0	Engine	91

== Standings after the race ==
	Pos	Driver	Points
	1	Mike Chase	370
1	2	Butch Gilliland	330 (-40)
1	3	John Krebs	311 (-59)
2	4	Bill Sedgwick	299 (-71)
2	5	Rick Scribner	280 (-90)
8	6	Bill Schmitt	270 (-100)
2	7	Jack Sellers	268 (-102)
14	8	Hershel McGriff	267 (-103)
2	9	Larry Gunselman	256 (-114)
2	10	Billy Jac Shaw	254 (-116)

- Note: Only the first 10 positions are included for the driver standings.

Previous race: 1991 Winston 300	NASCAR Winston West Series; 1991 season	Next race: 1991 Banquet Frozen Foods 300
