= Larry Gunselman =

American stock car racing driver and team owner

- Born: December 1, 1960 (age 65); Bremerton, Washington, U.S.
- Awards: 1996 NASCAR Winston West Series Most Popular Driver

NASCAR Cup Series career
- 7 races run over 3 years
- Best finish: 59th (2004)
- First race: 1996 Save Mart Supermarkets 300 (Sonoma)
- Last race: 2004 Banquet 400 (Kansas)
Wins	Top tens	Poles
0	0	0

NASCAR O'Reilly Auto Parts Series career
- 70 races run over 4 years
- Best finish: 21st (2003)
- First race: 2002 Aaron's 312 (Talladega)
- Last race: 2008 Hefty Odor Block 200 (Phoenix)
Wins	Top tens	Poles
0	0	0

NASCAR FedEx Freight Truck Series career
- 28 races run over 4 years
- Best finish: 23rd (2001)
- First race: 2000 Sears Craftsman 175 (Chicago)
- Last race: 2008 Camping World RV Sales 200 (Milwaukee)
Wins	Top tens	Poles
0	0	0
- Statistics up to date as of May 21, 2012.

Larry Gunselman (born December 1, 1960) is an American former stock car racing driver and team owner. He was the owner of Max Q Motorsports, which fielded the No. 37 Chevrolet in the NASCAR Sprint Cup Series from 2009 to 2012.

== Career ==
Gunselman began racing in various West Coast series before moving to the Winston West Series, where he won the Most Popular Driver award in 1996. That same year, he made his NASCAR debut in the Winston Cup Series at Sonoma. He qualified 43rd and finished 36th in the No. 35 Race Stuff/Olson Technology Ford Thunderbird. He would qualify the next year, picking up sponsorship from Caterpillar, Inc. after David Green's entry failed to qualify. Gunselman attempted two races in Cup in 1998 in the No. 37 and No. 58 cars, but failed to qualify for both of them. Gunselman also was invited to compete in Japan's Suzuka Thunder 100 in both 1996 and 1997.

Gunselman would return to competition in 2000 driving for Brevak Racing in the Craftsman Truck Series. He crashed out of his debut at Cicero, and had two twenty-sixth-place finishes in the next two races. In 2001, he joined MB Motorsports and picked up sponsorship from Waterloo Tool Storage. He drove seventeen races that season with a best finish of 16th at Kansas Speedway, as well as including an additional start at Texas Motor Speedway for Troxell Racing. He started out 2002 with MB, but was released after three starts due to sponsor conflicts between Waterloo Tool Storage and Sears Craftsman brand as Waterloo builds the Craftsman tool box brand. This opened the opportunity for Carl Edwards to join the Mittler Brothers team. Gunselman then took his sponsorship to DF2 Motorsports. After making a few Busch Series starts for Brian Weber, Gunselman hooked up with DF2 Motorsports and ran fourteen races with the team, his best finish a sixteenth at Talladega Superspeedway. He would move to Day Enterprise Racing the following season, and qualified for every race. He had an eighteenth place finish at Talladega and finished 21st in points at season's end.

Gunselman began 2004 by running the first two races of the season for MacDonald Motorsports, Gunselman and Chris Edwards formed Mach 1 Motorsports and started competition in the third Cup race of the year at Las Vegas. Mach 1 went on to attempt all the remaining Cup races that year. Gunselman remained out of the drivers seat until the middle of the year, when he ran five races for Mach 1 Racing in the Lucas Oil Ford Taurus, where he failed to finish higher than 33rd. Gunselman sold his interest in Mach 1 to Edwards at the end of 2004. He attempted to qualify for the 2005 and 2006 Daytona 500 for Ware Racing Enterprises, but did not make either race. After spending 2007 out of the sport, he returned to the Nationwide Series in 2008 when he was hired as the driver of the No. 91 Chevy for MSRP Motorsports, but was released after ten races. Shortly afterwards, he was hired by Derrike Cope to drive his No. 74 Dodge Ram in the Truck Series, and later by Johnny Davis to drive the No. 0 Chevrolet Monte Carlo in the Nationwide Series.

Following the 2008 season, he formed Gunselman Motorsports, which fielded the start-and-park No. 64 Toyota Camry in the Sprint Cup Series for parts of three seasons. After the 2011 Daytona 500, Gunselman partnered with Front Row Motorsports to purchase the No. 37 and No. 64 teams he owned. Under Gunselman the 37 team attempted every event in 2004 with 39th place finish in the owners standings. In 2012, Gunselman fielded the No. 37 with the intent of Timmy Hill going for Rookie of the Year honors, but parked the team after one crash and five DNQs. Max Q reformed the No. 37 in July 2012 fielding Chevrolets for J. J. Yeley through a technical alliance with Tommy Baldwin Racing.

== Motorsports career results ==
=== NASCAR ===
(key) (Bold – Pole position awarded by qualifying time. Italics – Pole position earned by points standings or practice time. * – Most laps led.)

==== Nextel Cup Series ====
NASCAR Nextel Cup Series results
Year	Team	No.	Make	1	2	3	4	5	6	7	8	9	10	11	12	13	14	15	16	17	18	19	20	21	22	23	24	25	26	27	28	29	30	31	32	33	34	35	36	NNCC	Pts	Ref
1996	Race Stuff Motorsports	35	Ford	DAY	CAR	RCH	ATL	DAR	BRI	NWS	MAR	TAL	SON; 36	CLT	DOV	POC	MCH	DAY	NHA	POC	TAL	IND	GLN	MCH	BRI	DAR	RCH	DOV	MAR	NWS	CLT	CAR	PHO; DNQ	ATL						62nd	55	
1997	Race Stuff Motorsports	35	Ford	DAY	CAR	RCH	ATL	DAR	TEX	BRI	MAR	SON; 38	TAL	CLT	DOV	POC	MCH	CAL	DAY	NHA	POC	IND	GLN	MCH	BRI	DAR	RCH	NHA	DOV	MAR	CLT	TAL	CAR	PHO	ATL					67th	49	
1998	Gunselman Racing	37	Ford	DAY	CAR	LVS; DNQ	ATL	DAR	BRI	TEX	MAR	TAL	CAL	CLT	DOV	RCH	MCH	POC	SON	NHA	POC	IND	GLN	MCH	BRI	NHA	DAR	RCH	DOV	MAR	CLT	TAL	DAY	PHO	CAR	ATL				NA	-	
2000	LJ Racing	91	Chevy	DAY	CAR	LVS	ATL	DAR	BRI	TEX	MAR	TAL	CAL	RCH	CLT	DOV	MCH	POC	SON	DAY	NHA	POC	IND	GLN	MCH	BRI	DAR	RCH	NHA	DOV	MAR	CLT; DNQ	TAL	CAR	PHO	HOM	ATL			NA	-	
2004	Mach 1 Motorsports	98	Ford	DAY	CAR	LVS; DNQ	ATL	DAR	BRI	TEX	MAR	TAL	CAL	RCH	CLT	DOV; DNQ	POC	MCH							GLN; 43	MCH	BRI	CAL	RCH	NHA	DOV	TAL; 33	KAN; 42	CLT	MAR	ATL	PHO	DAR	HOM	59th	248	
2004	Mach 1 Motorsports	98	Dodge																SON; 37																					59th	248	
2004	Mach 1 Motorsports	96	Ford																	DAY; 34	CHI	NHA	POC	IND																59th	248	
2005	Rick Ware Racing	52	Ford	DAY; DNQ	CAL	LVS	ATL	BRI	MAR	TEX	PHO	TAL	DAR	RCH	CLT	DOV	POC	MCH	SON	DAY	CHI	NHA	POC	IND	GLN	MCH	BRI	CAL	RCH	NHA	DOV	TAL	KAN	CLT	MAR	ATL	TEX	PHO	HOM	NA	-	
2006	Rick Ware Racing	52	Dodge	DAY; DNQ	CAL	LVS	ATL	BRI	MAR	TEX	PHO	TAL	RCH	DAR	CLT	DOV	POC	MCH	SON	DAY	CHI	NHA	POC	IND	GLN	MCH	BRI	CAL	RCH	NHA	DOV	KAN	TAL	CLT	MAR	ATL	TEX	PHO	HOM	NA	-	

===== Daytona 500 =====
Year	Team	Manufacturer	Start	Finish
2005	Rick Ware Racing	Ford	DNQ	
2006	Rick Ware Racing	Dodge	DNQ	

==== Nationwide Series ====
NASCAR Nationwide Series results
Year	Team	No.	Make	1	2	3	4	5	6	7	8	9	10	11	12	13	14	15	16	17	18	19	20	21	22	23	24	25	26	27	28	29	30	31	32	33	34	35	NNSC	Pts	Ref
2002	Weber Racing	84	Chevy	DAY	CAR	LVS	DAR	BRI	TEX	NSH	TAL; 16	CAL	RCH	NHA		CLT; DNQ	DOV	NSH			DAY; 23																		41st	1094	
2002	Weber Racing	8	Chevy												NZH; 41																								41st	1094	
2002	PF2 Motorsports	94	Chevy																KEN; 33	MLW		CHI; 37	GTY; 25	PPR; 31	IRP; 26	MCH; 28	BRI; 35	DAR; 35	RCH	DOV; 34	KAN; 36	CLT; DNQ	MEM; 33	ATL; 31	CAR; 43	PHO; 42	HOM; DNQ		41st	1094	
2003	Day Enterprises Racing	16	Chevy	DAY; 35	CAR; 33	LVS; 28	DAR; 37	BRI; 28	TEX; 39		NSH; 34		RCH; 26	GTY; 22	NZH; 23			NSH; 32	KEN; 23	MLW; 34	DAY; 32	CHI; 38	NHA; 20	PPR; 30	IRP; 32	MCH; 38		DAR; 26	RCH; 23	DOV; 32	KAN; 23	CLT; 33	MEM; 22	ATL; 39	PHO; 32	CAR; 42	HOM; 40		21st	2371	
2003	Day Enterprises Racing	16	Pontiac							TAL; 18		CAL; 30				CLT; 42	DOV; 32										BRI; 39												21st	2371	
2004	MacDonald Motorsports	72	Chevy	DAY; 22	CAR; 31	LVS; DNQ	DAR	BRI	TEX	NSH	TAL	CAL	GTY	RCH	NZH	CLT	DOV	NSH	KEN	MLW	DAY	CHI	NHA	PPR	IRP	MCH	BRI	CAL	RCH	DOV	KAN	CLT	MEM	ATL	PHO	DAR	HOM		99th	167	
2008	MSRP Motorsports	91	Ford	DAY; DNQ									TAL; 43	RCH	DAR	CLT	DOV	NSH																					55th	737	
2008	MSRP Motorsports	91	Chevy		CAL; 42	LVS; 38	ATL; 39	BRI; 39	NSH; 42	TEX; 41	PHO; 39	MXC; 41																											55th	737	
2008	CFK Motorsports	73	Dodge																KEN; 41	MLW	NHA	DAY																	55th	737	
2008	JD Motorsports	0	Chevy																				CHI; 43	GTY; 42	IRP; 42	CGV	GLN; DNQ	MCH; DNQ	BRI; 38	CAL; 36	RCH; DNQ	DOV; 36	KAN; DNQ	CLT; DNQ	MEM; DNQ	TEX			55th	737	
2008	JD Motorsports	01	Chevy																																		PHO; 36	HOM	55th	737	

==== Craftsman Truck Series ====
NASCAR Craftsman Truck Series results
Year	Team	No.	Make	1	2	3	4	5	6	7	8	9	10	11	12	13	14	15	16	17	18	19	20	21	22	23	24	25	NCTC	Pts	Ref
2000	Brevak Racing	31	Ford	DAY	HOM	PHO	MMR	MAR	PIR	GTY	MEM	PPR	EVG	TEX	KEN	GLN	MLW	NHA	NZH	MCH	IRP	NSV	CIC; 32	RCH; 26	DOV; DNQ	TEX; 26	CAL		61st	286	
2001	MB Motorsports	63	Ford	DAY; 18	HOM; 36	MMR; 26	MAR; 17	GTY; 23						MLW; 19	KAN; 16	KEN; 22	NHA; 31	IRP; 31	NSH	CIC; 24				TEX; 35	LVS; 33	PHO	CAL; 29		23rd	1461	
2001	MB Motorsports	63	Chevy						DAR; 36	PPR; 32	DOV										NZH; 33	RCH	SBO						23rd	1461	
2001	Troxell Racing	93	Dodge									TEX; 30	MEM																23rd	1461	
2002	MB Motorsports	63	Ford	DAY; 31	DAR; 32	MAR	GTY; 30	PPR																					54th	298	
2002	Troxell Racing	93	Chevy						DOV; 25	TEX	MEM	MLW	KAN	KEN	NHA	MCH	IRP	NSH	RCH	TEX	SBO	LVS	CAL	PHO	HOM				54th	298	
2008	Derrike Cope Inc.	74	Dodge	DAY	CAL	ATL	MAR	KAN	CLT	MFD	DOV; 34	TEX; 35	MCH																109th	61	
2008	Derrike Cope Inc.	73	Dodge											MLW; 34	MEM	KEN	IRP	NSH	BRI	GTW	NHA	LVS	TAL	MAR	ATL	TEX	PHO	HOM	109th	61	

==== Winston West Series ====
NASCAR Winston West Series results
Year	Team	No.	Make	1	2	3	4	5	6	7	8	9	10	11	12	13	14	15	NWWSC	Pts	Ref
1990	Gunselman Racing	07	Pontiac	MMR	SON	SGS	POR	EVG	RAS	TCR; 11	MMR	PHO							40th	130	
1991	Gunselman Racing	60	Pontiac	EVG; 6	MMR; 19	SON	SGS	POR	EVG; 36	SSS	MMR	PHO							27th	311	
1992	Gunselman Racing	60	Pontiac	MMR	SGS	SON	SHA	POR; 9	EVG; 18	SSS	CAJ	TWS	MMR	PHO					25th	247	
1993	Gunselman Racing	60	Pontiac	TWS	MMR	SGS	SON	TUS	SHA	EVG; 17	POR; 7	CBS; 9	SSS; 5	CAJ	TCR; 13	MMR	PHO		18th	675	
1994	Gunselman Racing	60	Pontiac	MMR; 19	TUS; 20	SON	SGS	YAK; 8	MMR	POR; 16	IND	CAJ	TCR; 11	LVS; 7	MMR; 3	PHO	TUS; 15		12th	1025	
1995	Gunselman Racing	60	Pontiac	TUS	MMR	SON	CNS	MMR	POR	SGS	TUS	AMP	MAD	POR; 21	LVS; 12	SON	MMR	PHO	37th	227	
1996	Race Stuff Motorsports	37	Ford	TUS; 16	AMP; 7	MMR; 1		MAD; 3	POR; 2	TUS; 13	EVG; 3	CNS; 3	MAD; 6	MMR; 4	SON; 14	MMR; 5	PHO; DNQ	LVS; 4	3rd	2070	
1996	Race Stuff Motorsports	35	Ford				SON; 36												3rd	2070	
1997	Race Stuff Motorsports	37	Ford	TUS; 5	AMP; 11		TUS; 6	MMR; 6	LVS; 18	CAL; 19	EVG; 6	POR; 4	PPR; 20	AMP; 2	SON; 21	MMR; 2*	LVS; 24		4th	1833	
1997	Race Stuff Motorsports	35	Ford			SON; 38													4th	1833	
1998	Race Stuff Motorsports	37	Ford	TUS; 19	LVS; 28	PHO	CAL; 13	HPT	MMR	AMP	POR	CAL	PPR	EVG	SON	MMR	LVS		42nd	309	
