= 1991 Banquet Frozen Foods 300 =

12th race of the 1991 NASCAR Winston Cup Series

Race details
- Race 12 of 29 in the 1991 NASCAR Winston Cup Series
- The 1991 Banquet Frozen Foods 300 program cover, featuring Jimmy Spencer.
- Date: June 9, 1991
- Official name: 3rd Annual Banquet Frozen Foods 300
- Location: Sears Point Raceway, Sonoma, California
- Course: Permanent racing facility
- Course length: 2.52 miles (4.06 km)
- Distance: 74 laps, 186.48 mi (300.11 km)
- Average speed: 72.97 miles per hour (117.43 km/h)
- Attendance: 62,000

Pole position
Driver	Ricky Rudd	Hendrick Motorsports
- Time: 1:40.095

Most laps led
Driver	Rusty Wallace	Penske Racing South
- Laps: 45

Winner
No. 28	Davey Allison	Robert Yates Racing

Television in the United States
- Network: ESPN
- Announcers: Bob Jenkins, Ned Jarrett, Benny Parsons

Radio in the United States
- Radio: Motor Racing Network

The 1991 Banquet Frozen Foods 300 was the 12th stock car race of the 1991 NASCAR Winston Cup Series season, the third race of the 1991 NASCAR Winston West Series season, and the third iteration of the event. The race was held on Sunday, June 9, 1991, before an audience of 62,000 at the Grand Prix layout of Sears Point Raceway, a 2.52 miles (4.06 km) permanent road course layout. The race took the scheduled 74 laps to complete. In the final laps of the race, Robert Yates Racing driver Davey Allison, with the assist of a late-race penalty on leader Ricky Rudd, would manage to comeback from a late-race spin to take his tenth career NASCAR Winston Cup Series victory and his second victory of the season. To fill out the top three, the aforementioned Ricky Rudd and Penske Racing South driver Rusty Wallace would finish second and third, respectively.

In what has been considered by NASCAR drivers and media as one of the most controversial rule callings in NASCAR history, Hendrick Motorsports driver Ricky Rudd was penalized after performing a bump and run maneuver on the final turn of the raceway with two laps to go in the race on leader Davey Allison. After Rudd completed his final lap, Rudd was shown the black flag instead of the checkered flag, instead showing the checkered flag to Allison to signify that Allison had won the race. Rudd, who was initially given a drive-through penalty, was given a five-second time penalty for the move on Allison for not taking the drive-through penalty, moving Rudd to a second-place finish. Rudd argued that he had both not known of the penalty and that he did not enough time to serve a penalty, who was given the black flag on the final lap of the race. According to NASCAR rules, a driver had three laps to serve their penalty. Dave Marcis, who was near the accident, would agree with Rudd, saying "How is Ricky supposed to know he got a black flag? He was up in Turn 2 or 3 by then." According to NASCAR's vice president for Competition, Les Richter, the move that Rudd had made was "unnecessary and avoidable", a decision that which both confused and angered Rudd and his team, saying that NASCAR had never made such a decision before for a bump and run maneuver.

Immediately after the race, Rudd and Rudd's crew chief, Waddell Wilson, would protest the results of the race. Wilson was recorded by The Charlotte Observer reporter Tom Higgins pleading to NASCAR president Bill France Jr. to change the results, saying "Don't take this race away from us, Billy!... You told all [the drivers] in the drivers' meeting that on the last lap they were on their own!" Rudd himself would compare the officiating of NASCAR officials to the World Wrestling Federation, saying that "This is the best example of how NASCAR makes their own rules. NASCAR needs a Ford in victory lane." Allison, the winner of the race, speaking in an article for The Press Democrat said "We feel like we deserve the victory, and we're going to savor it just like the rest of them."

== Background ==
The layout of Sears Point Raceway used by NASCAR at the time.

Sears Point Raceway is one of two road courses to hold NASCAR races, the other being Watkins Glen International. The standard road course at Sears Point Raceway is a 12-turn course that is 2.52 miles (4.06 km) long; the track was modified in 1998, adding the Chute, which bypassed turns 5 and 6, shortening the course to 1.95 miles (3.14 km). The Chute was only used for NASCAR events such as this race, and was criticized by many drivers, who preferred the full layout. In 2001, it was replaced with a 70-degree turn, 4A, bringing the track to its current dimensions of 1.99 miles (3.20 km).

=== Entry list ===
- (R) denotes rookie driver.

#	Driver	Team	Make
00	Scott Gaylord	Oliver Racing	Oldsmobile
1	Rick Mast	Precision Products Racing	Oldsmobile
2	Rusty Wallace	Penske Racing South	Pontiac
3	Dale Earnhardt	Richard Childress Racing	Chevrolet
4	Ernie Irvan	Morgan–McClure Motorsports	Chevrolet
04	Hershel McGriff	Lipseia Racing	Pontiac
5	Ricky Rudd	Hendrick Motorsports	Chevrolet
6	Mark Martin	Roush Racing	Ford
7	Alan Kulwicki	AK Racing	Ford
8	Rick Wilson	Stavola Brothers Racing	Buick
9	Bill Elliott	Melling Racing	Ford
09	R. K. Smith	Midgley Racing	Pontiac
10	Derrike Cope	Whitcomb Racing	Chevrolet
12	Hut Stricklin	Bobby Allison Motorsports	Buick
15	Morgan Shepherd	Bud Moore Engineering	Ford
17	Darrell Waltrip	Darrell Waltrip Motorsports	Chevrolet
19	Chad Little	Little Racing	Ford
20	Kim Campbell	Moroso Racing	Oldsmobile
21	Dale Jarrett	Wood Brothers Racing	Ford
22	Sterling Marlin	Junior Johnson & Associates	Ford
23	Mike Chase	Freymiller Racing	Ford
24	Mickey Gibbs	Team III Racing	Pontiac
24W	Butch Gilliland	Gilliland Racing	Pontiac
25	Ken Schrader	Hendrick Motorsports	Chevrolet
26	Brett Bodine	King Racing	Buick
28	Davey Allison	Robert Yates Racing	Ford
30	Michael Waltrip	Bahari Racing	Pontiac
33	Harry Gant	Leo Jackson Motorsports	Oldsmobile
42	Tommy Kendall	SABCO Racing	Pontiac
43	Richard Petty	Petty Enterprises	Pontiac
44	Irv Hoerr	Labonte Motorsports	Oldsmobile
44W	Jack Sellers	Emerson Racing	Buick
49	Stanley Smith (R)	BS&S Motorsports	Buick
52	Bobby Hillin Jr.	Jimmy Means Racing	Pontiac
55	Ted Musgrave (R)	U.S. Racing	Pontiac
66	Lake Speed	Cale Yarborough Motorsports	Pontiac
68	Bobby Hamilton (R)	TriStar Motorsports	Oldsmobile
71	Dave Marcis	Marcis Auto Racing	Chevrolet
73	Bill Schmitt	Schmitt Racing	Ford
75	Joe Ruttman	RahMoc Enterprises	Oldsmobile
76	Bill Sedgwick	Spears Motorsports	Chevrolet
91	Robert Sprague	Rouse Racing	Ford
93	Troy Beebe	Beebe Racing	Buick
94	Terry Labonte	Hagan Racing	Oldsmobile
97	Geoff Bodine	Junior Johnson & Associates	Ford
98	Jimmy Spencer	Travis Carter Enterprises	Chevrolet
99	John Krebs	KC Racing	Pontiac

== Qualifying ==
Qualifying was split into two rounds. The first round was held on Friday, June 7, at 6:30 PM EST. Each driver would have one lap to set a time. During the first round, the top 25 drivers in the round would be guaranteed a starting spot in the race. If a driver was not able to guarantee a spot in the first round, they had the option to scrub their time from the first round and try and run a faster lap time in a second round qualifying run, held on Saturday, June 8, at 1:00 PM EST. As with the first round, each driver would have one lap to set a time. For this specific race, positions 26-40 would be decided on time, and depending on who needed it, a select amount of positions were given to cars who had not otherwise qualified but were high enough in owner's points; which was one for cars in the NASCAR Winston Cup Series and two extra provisionals for the NASCAR Winston West Series. If needed, a past champion who did not qualify on either time or provisionals could use a champion's provisional, adding one more spot to the field.

Ricky Rudd, driving for Hendrick Motorsports, would win the pole, setting a time of 1:40.095 and an average speed of 90.634 miles per hour (145.861 km/h) in the first round.

Four drivers would fail to qualify.

=== Full qualifying results ===
Pos.	#	Driver	Team	Make	Time	Speed
1	5	Ricky Rudd	Hendrick Motorsports	Chevrolet	1:40.095	90.634
2	94	Terry Labonte	Hagan Racing	Oldsmobile	1:40.123	90.609
3	3	Dale Earnhardt	Richard Childress Racing	Chevrolet	1:40.468	90.297
4	2	Rusty Wallace	Penske Racing South	Pontiac	1:40.668	90.118
5	42	Tommy Kendall	SABCO Racing	Pontiac	1:40.783	90.015
6	25	Ken Schrader	Hendrick Motorsports	Chevrolet	1:40.820	89.982
7	7	Alan Kulwicki	AK Racing	Ford	1:40.876	89.932
8	30	Michael Waltrip	Bahari Racing	Pontiac	1:41.080	89.751
9	66	Lake Speed	Cale Yarborough Motorsports	Pontiac	1:41.088	89.744
10	17	Darrell Waltrip	Darrell Waltrip Motorsports	Chevrolet	1:41.203	89.642
11	4	Ernie Irvan	Morgan–McClure Motorsports	Chevrolet	1:41.230	89.618
12	97	Geoff Bodine	Junior Johnson & Associates	Ford	1:41.265	89.587
13	28	Davey Allison	Robert Yates Racing	Ford	1:41.477	89.400
14	6	Mark Martin	Roush Racing	Ford	1:41.559	89.327
15	22	Sterling Marlin	Junior Johnson & Associates	Ford	1:41.814	89.104
16	71	Dave Marcis	Marcis Auto Racing	Chevrolet	1:41.887	89.040
17	75	Joe Ruttman	RahMoc Enterprises	Oldsmobile	1:41.902	89.027
18	44	Irv Hoerr	Labonte Motorsports	Oldsmobile	1:41.923	89.008
19	8	Rick Wilson	Stavola Brothers Racing	Buick	1:41.960	88.976
20	15	Morgan Shepherd	Bud Moore Engineering	Ford	1:42.025	88.919
21	21	Dale Jarrett	Wood Brothers Racing	Ford	1:42.140	88.819
22	04	Hershel McGriff	Lipseia Racing	Pontiac	1:42.158	88.804
23	33	Harry Gant	Leo Jackson Motorsports	Oldsmobile	1:42.249	88.725
24	12	Hut Stricklin	Bobby Allison Motorsports	Buick	1:42.380	88.611
25	73	Bill Schmitt	Schmitt Racing	Ford	1:42.543	88.470
Failed to lock in Round 1
26	9	Bill Elliott	Melling Racing	Ford	1:40.924	89.889
27	19	Chad Little	Little Racing	Ford	1:41.819	89.099
28	26	Brett Bodine	King Racing	Buick	1:42.657	88.372
29	76	Bill Sedgwick	Spears Motorsports	Chevrolet	1:42.715	88.322
30	10	Derrike Cope	Whitcomb Racing	Chevrolet	1:42.837	88.217
31	00	Scott Gaylord	Oliver Racing	Oldsmobile	1:42.973	88.101
32	24	Mickey Gibbs	Team III Racing	Pontiac	1:43.131	87.966
33	52	Bobby Hillin Jr.	Jimmy Means Racing	Pontiac	1:43.250	87.864
34	49	Stanley Smith (R)	BS&S Motorsports	Buick	1:43.508	87.645
35	68	Bobby Hamilton (R)	TriStar Motorsports	Oldsmobile	1:43.550	87.610
36	09	R. K. Smith	Midgley Racing	Pontiac	1:43.624	87.547
37	55	Ted Musgrave (R)	U.S. Racing	Pontiac	1:43.755	87.437
38	98	Jimmy Spencer	Travis Carter Enterprises	Chevrolet	1:43.833	87.371
39	43	Richard Petty	Petty Enterprises	Pontiac	1:44.075	87.168
40	99	John Krebs	KC Racing	Pontiac	1:44.180	87.080
Winston Cup provisional
41	1	Rick Mast	Precision Products Racing	Oldsmobile	1:44.581	86.746
Winston West provisionals
42	23	Mike Chase	Freymiller Racing	Ford	1:44.221	87.046
43	91	Robert Sprague	Rouse Racing	Ford	1:45.919	85.650
Failed to qualify
44	24W	Butch Gilliland	Gilliland Racing	Pontiac	-*	-*
45	44	Jack Sellers	Emerson Racing	Buick	-*	-*
46	93	Troy Beebe	Beebe Racing	Buick	-*	-*
47	20	Kim Campbell	Moroso Racing	Oldsmobile	-*	-*
Official first round qualifying results
Official starting lineup

== Race results ==
Fin	St	#	Driver	Team	Make	Laps	Led	Status	Pts	Winnings
1	13	28	Davey Allison	Robert Yates Racing	Ford	74	2	running	180	$61,950
2	1	5	Ricky Rudd	Hendrick Motorsports	Chevrolet	74	12	running	175	$41,975
3	4	2	Rusty Wallace	Penske Racing South	Pontiac	74	45	running	175	$34,975
4	11	4	Ernie Irvan	Morgan–McClure Motorsports	Chevrolet	74	0	running	160	$20,350
5	6	25	Ken Schrader	Hendrick Motorsports	Chevrolet	74	0	running	155	$17,225
6	2	94	Terry Labonte	Hagan Racing	Oldsmobile	74	0	running	150	$14,400
7	3	3	Dale Earnhardt	Richard Childress Racing	Chevrolet	74	0	running	146	$19,800
8	12	97	Geoff Bodine	Junior Johnson & Associates	Ford	74	0	running	142	$7,650
9	14	6	Mark Martin	Roush Racing	Ford	74	0	running	138	$16,850
10	8	30	Michael Waltrip	Bahari Racing	Pontiac	74	0	running	134	$10,600
11	28	26	Brett Bodine	King Racing	Buick	74	0	running	130	$10,100
12	9	66	Lake Speed	Cale Yarborough Motorsports	Pontiac	74	0	running	127	$9,600
13	25	73	Bill Schmitt	Schmitt Racing	Ford	74	0	running	124	$7,300
14	32	24	Mickey Gibbs	Team III Racing	Pontiac	74	0	running	121	$6,600
15	29	76	Bill Sedgwick	Spears Motorsports	Chevrolet	74	0	running	118	$6,400
16	19	8	Rick Wilson	Stavola Brothers Racing	Buick	74	0	running	115	$7,450
17	7	7	Alan Kulwicki	AK Racing	Ford	74	0	running	112	$11,275
18	5	42	Tommy Kendall	SABCO Racing	Pontiac	74	12	running	114	$12,450
19	41	1	Rick Mast	Precision Products Racing	Oldsmobile	73	0	running	106	$7,225
20	26	9	Bill Elliott	Melling Racing	Ford	73	0	running	103	$13,700
21	33	52	Bobby Hillin Jr.	Jimmy Means Racing	Pontiac	73	0	running	100	$4,100
22	35	68	Bobby Hamilton (R)	TriStar Motorsports	Oldsmobile	73	0	running	97	$5,775
23	34	49	Stanley Smith (R)	BS&S Motorsports	Buick	73	0	running	94	$4,050
24	16	71	Dave Marcis	Marcis Auto Racing	Chevrolet	72	0	running	91	$6,830
25	10	17	Darrell Waltrip	Darrell Waltrip Motorsports	Chevrolet	71	0	running	88	$4,820
26	15	22	Sterling Marlin	Junior Johnson & Associates	Ford	71	0	running	85	$4,650
27	23	33	Harry Gant	Leo Jackson Motorsports	Oldsmobile	70	0	running	82	$6,600
28	27	19	Chad Little	Little Racing	Ford	67	0	running	79	$3,850
29	38	98	Jimmy Spencer	Travis Carter Enterprises	Chevrolet	65	0	running	76	$6,490
30	30	10	Derrike Cope	Whitcomb Racing	Chevrolet	64	0	running	73	$12,210
31	17	75	Joe Ruttman	RahMoc Enterprises	Oldsmobile	64	0	running	70	$6,350
32	22	04	Hershel McGriff	Lipseia Racing	Pontiac	61	0	accident	67	$3,675
33	31	00	Scott Gaylord	Oliver Racing	Oldsmobile	61	0	running	64	$3,625
34	39	43	Richard Petty	Petty Enterprises	Pontiac	59	0	accident	61	$5,200
35	24	12	Hut Stricklin	Bobby Allison Motorsports	Buick	59	0	running	58	$5,575
36	18	44	Irv Hoerr	Labonte Motorsports	Oldsmobile	58	0	rear end	55	$3,565
37	37	55	Ted Musgrave (R)	U.S. Racing	Pontiac	58	0	running	52	$3,795
38	40	99	John Krebs	KC Racing	Pontiac	57	1	running	54	$3,525
39	43	91	Robert Sprague	Rouse Racing	Ford	54	1	engine	51	$3,500
40	42	23	Mike Chase	Freymiller Racing	Ford	53	0	transmission	43	$3,475
41	21	21	Dale Jarrett	Wood Brothers Racing	Ford	46	1	ignition	45	$5,475
42	20	15	Morgan Shepherd	Bud Moore Engineering	Ford	39	0	engine	37	$10,475
43	36	09	R. K. Smith	Midgley Racing	Pontiac	2	0	engine	34	$3,475
Failed to qualify
44		24W	Butch Gilliland	Gilliland Racing	Pontiac					
45		44	Jack Sellers	Emerson Racing	Buick					
46		93	Troy Beebe	Beebe Racing	Buick					
47		20	Kim Campbell	Moroso Racing	Oldsmobile					
Official race results

== Standings after the race ==
Drivers' Championship standings

	Pos	Driver	Points
	1	Dale Earnhardt	1,862
	2	Ricky Rudd	1,809 (-53)
2	3	Ken Schrader	1,666 (-196)
1	4	Darrell Waltrip	1,662 (–200)
1	5	Ernie Irvan	1,654 (–208)
1	6	Davey Allison	1,637 (–225)
3	7	Harry Gant	1,602 (–260)
1	8	Michael Waltrip	1,517 (–345)
1	9	Mark Martin	1,515 (–347)
2	10	Rusty Wallace	1,482 (–380)
Official driver's standings

- Note: Only the first 10 positions are included for the driver standings.

Previous race: 1991 Budweiser 500	NASCAR Winston Cup Series; 1991 season	Next race: 1991 Champion Spark Plug 500

Previous race: 1991 California 400	NASCAR Winston West Series; 1991 season	Next race: 1991 Winston 200
