= Butch Gilliland =

American racing driver (born 1958)

- Born: February 25, 1958 (age 68); Albuquerque, New Mexico, U.S.
- Achievements: 1997 NASCAR Winston West Series champion 1997 and 1999 NASCAR Winston West Series Most Popular Driver
- Awards: West Coast Stock Car Hall of Fame (2012)

NASCAR Cup Series career
- 10 races run over 11 years
- Best finish: 60th (1997)
- First race: 1990 Banquet Frozen Foods 300 (Sonoma)
- Last race: 1999 Save Mart/Kragen 350 (Sonoma)
| Wins | Top tens | Poles |
|---|---|---|
| 0 | 0 | 0 |

NASCAR FedEx Freight Truck Series career
- 12 races run over 3 years
- Best finish: 39th (1995)
- First race: 1995 Skoal Bandit Copper World Classic (Phoenix)
- Last race: 1997 Carquest 420K (Las Vegas)
| Wins | Top tens | Poles |
|---|---|---|
| 0 | 1 | 0 |

ARCA Menards Series career
- 2 races run over 2 years
- First race: 1992 NASCAR/ARCA Texas World Speedway Shootout (Texas World)
- Last race: 1993 Western Auto Texas Shootout II (Texas World)
| Wins | Top tens | Poles |
|---|---|---|
| 0 | 1 | 0 |

ARCA Menards Series West career
- 123 races run over 14 years
- Best finish: 1st (1997)
- First race: 1987 American National Bank 200 (Mesa Marin)
- Last race: 2002 Pontiac Widetrack Grand Prix 200 (California)
- First win: 1995 Valencia Dodge 200 (Saugus)
- Last win: 1999 Bank One 250 (Rocky Mountain)
| Wins | Top tens | Poles |
|---|---|---|
| 13 | 75 | 15 |
- Statistics up to date as of February 25, 2025.

Leonard N. "Butch" Gilliland (born February 25, 1958) is an American former NASCAR Winston Cup Series and Craftsman Truck Series driver from California. He was the 1997 Winston West Series champion and based on the west coast. All of his ten Cup starts came at either Sears Point Raceway or Phoenix International Raceway, most of them as West competitors in Cup/West combination races, and all twelve of his Truck Series starts came at various west coast tracks. He has one NASCAR national series top-ten, which he recorded in a Truck Series race at Saugus Speedway in Santa Clarita, California in 1995. He retired from competitive racing in 2002.

He is the father of former Cup Series driver David Gilliland and the grandfather of NASCAR Cup Series driver Todd Gilliland.

== Motorsports career results ==
=== NASCAR ===
(key) (Bold – Pole position awarded by qualifying time. Italics – Pole position earned by points standings or practice time. * – Most laps led.)

==== Winston Cup Series ====
NASCAR Winston Cup Series results
| Year | Team | No. | Make | 1 | 2 | 3 | 4 | 5 | 6 | 7 | 8 | 9 | 10 | 11 | 12 | 13 | 14 | 15 | 16 | 17 | 18 | 19 | 20 | 21 | 22 | 23 | 24 | 25 | 26 | 27 | 28 | 29 | 30 | 31 | 32 | 33 | 34 | NWCC | Pts | Ref |
|---|---|---|---|---|---|---|---|---|---|---|---|---|---|---|---|---|---|---|---|---|---|---|---|---|---|---|---|---|---|---|---|---|---|---|---|---|---|---|---|---|
| 1988 | Gilliland Racing | 14W | Buick | DAY | RCH | CAR | ATL | DAR | BRI | NWS | MAR | TAL | CLT | DOV | RSD; DNQ | POC | MCH | DAY | POC | TAL | GLN | MCH | BRI | DAR | RCH | DOV | MAR | CLT | NWS | CAR | PHO; DNQ | ATL | | | | | | NA | - | |
| 1989 | Gilliland Racing | 24 | Chevy | DAY | CAR | ATL | RCH | DAR | BRI | NWS | MAR | TAL | CLT | DOV | SON | POC | MCH | DAY | POC | TAL | GLN | MCH | BRI | DAR | RCH | DOV | MAR | CLT | NWS | CAR | PHO; DNQ | ATL | | | | | | NA | - | |
| 1990 | Gilliland Racing | 24 | Chevy | DAY | RCH | CAR | ATL | DAR | BRI | NWS | MAR | TAL | CLT | DOV | SON; 28 | POC | MCH | DAY | POC | TAL | GLN | MCH | BRI | DAR | RCH | DOV | MAR | NWS | CLT | CAR | PHO; DNQ | ATL | | | | | | 84th | 79 | |
| 1991 | Gilliland Racing | 24W | Pontiac | DAY | RCH | CAR | ATL | DAR | BRI | NWS | MAR | TAL | CLT | DOV | SON; DNQ | POC | MCH | DAY | POC | TAL | GLN | MCH | BRI | DAR | RCH | DOV | MAR | NWS | CLT | CAR | | | | | | | | 78th | 76 | |
| 1991 | Gilliland Racing | 23 | Pontiac | | | | | | | | | | | | | | | | | | | | | | | | | | | | PHO; 29 | ATL | | | | | | 78th | 76 | |
| 1992 | Gilliland Racing | 24 | Pontiac | DAY | CAR | RCH | ATL | DAR | BRI | NWS | MAR | TAL | CLT | DOV | SON; 38 | POC | MCH | DAY | POC | TAL | GLN | MCH | BRI | DAR | RCH | DOV | MAR | NWS | CLT | CAR | PHO; 29 | ATL | | | | | | 65th | 125 | |
| 1993 | Gilliland Racing | 36 | Chevy | DAY | CAR | RCH | ATL | DAR | BRI | NWS | MAR | TAL | SON; 32 | CLT | DOV | POC | MCH | DAY | NHA | POC | TAL | GLN | MCH | BRI | DAR | RCH | DOV | MAR | NWS | CLT | CAR | PHO; DNQ | ATL | | | | | 78th | 67 | |
| 1994 | Gilliland Racing | 36 | Chevy | DAY | CAR | RCH | ATL | DAR | BRI | NWS | MAR | TAL | SON; 27 | CLT | DOV | POC | MCH | DAY | NHA | POC | TAL | | | | | | | | | | | | | | | | | 67th | 82 | |
| 1994 | Gilliland Racing | 86W | Chevy | | | | | | | | | | | | | | | | | | | IND; DNQ | GLN | MCH | BRI | DAR | RCH | DOV | MAR | NWS | CLT | CAR | PHO | ATL | | | | 67th | 82 | |
| 1995 | Stroppe Motorsports | 38 | Ford | DAY | CAR | RCH | ATL | DAR | BRI | NWS | MAR | TAL | SON; 42 | CLT | DOV | POC | MCH | DAY | NHA | POC | TAL | IND | GLN | MCH | BRI | DAR | RCH | DOV | MAR | NWS | CLT | CAR | PHO | ATL | | | | 69th | 37 | |
| 1997 | Stroppe Motorsports | 38 | Ford | DAY | CAR | RCH | ATL | DAR | TEX | BRI | MAR | SON; 24 | TAL | CLT | DOV | POC | MCH | CAL | DAY | NHA | POC | IND | GLN | MCH | BRI | DAR | RCH | NHA | DOV | MAR | CLT | TAL | CAR | PHO | ATL | | | 60th | 91 | |
| 1998 | Melling Racing | 9 | Ford | DAY | CAR | LVS | ATL | DAR | BRI | TEX | MAR | TAL | CAL | CLT | DOV | RCH | MCH | POC | SON; 24 | NHA | POC | IND | GLN | MCH | BRI | NHA | DAR | RCH | DOV | MAR | CLT | TAL | DAY | PHO | CAR | ATL | | 64th | 91 | |
| 1999 | Gilliland Racing | 38 | Ford | DAY | CAR | LVS; DNQ | ATL | DAR | TEX | BRI | MAR | TAL | CAL; DNQ | RCH | CLT | DOV | MCH | POC | SON; 43 | DAY | NHA | POC | IND | GLN | MCH | BRI | DAR | RCH | NHA | DOV | MAR | CLT | TAL | CAR | PHO | HOM | ATL | 69th | 34 | |

==== Craftsman Truck Series ====
NASCAR Craftsman Truck Series results
| Year | Team | No. | Make | 1 | 2 | 3 | 4 | 5 | 6 | 7 | 8 | 9 | 10 | 11 | 12 | 13 | 14 | 15 | 16 | 17 | 18 | 19 | 20 | 21 | 22 | 23 | 24 | 25 | 26 | NCTC | Pts | Ref |
|---|---|---|---|---|---|---|---|---|---|---|---|---|---|---|---|---|---|---|---|---|---|---|---|---|---|---|---|---|---|---|---|---|
| 1995 | Ultra Motorsports | 06 | Ford | PHO; 31 | TUS; 26 | SGS; 7 | MMR; 29 | POR | EVG | I70 | LVL | BRI | MLW | CNS | HPT; 13 | IRP | FLM | RCH | MAR | NWS | SON | MMR | PHO | | | | | | | 39th | 501 | |
| 1996 | Stroppe Motorsports | 14 | Ford | HOM; 15 | PHO; 24 | POR; 23 | EVG; 21 | TUS; 25 | CNS | HPT | BRI | NZH | MLW | LVL | I70 | IRP | FLM | GLN | NSV | RCH | NHA | MAR | NWS | SON | MMR; 30 | PHO; DNQ | LVS; DNQ | | | 40th | 611 | |
| 1997 | Doran Racing | 71 | Chevy | WDW | TUS | HOM | PHO | POR | EVG | I70 | NHA | TEX | BRI | NZH | MLW | LVL | CNS | HPT | IRP | FLM | NSV | GLN | RCH | MAR | SON | MMR | CAL | PHO | LVS; 19 | 104th | 106 | |

==== Winston West Series ====
NASCAR Winston West Series results
| Year | Team | No. | Make | 1 | 2 | 3 | 4 | 5 | 6 | 7 | 8 | 9 | 10 | 11 | 12 | 13 | 14 | 15 | NWWC | Pts | Ref |
|---|---|---|---|---|---|---|---|---|---|---|---|---|---|---|---|---|---|---|---|---|---|
| 1987 | Reno Fontana | 16 | Pontiac | SON | RSD | SGP | EVG | POR | TAC | MMR; 22 | RSD | | | | | | | | 41st | 29 | |
| 1988 | Gilliland Racing | 4 | Chevy | SON | MMR; 22 | | | | | | | | | | | | | | 19th | 156 | |
| 1988 | Gilliland Racing | 14 | Buick | | | RSD; DNQ | SGP | POR | | | PHO; DNQ | | | | | | | | 19th | 156 | |
| 1988 | Gilliland Racing | 4 | Buick | | | | | | EVG; 28 | MMR; 7 | | | | | | | | | 19th | 156 | |
| 1989 | Gilliland Racing | 24 | Buick | MAD; 5 | MMR; 15 | RAS; 16 | SON | POR; 9 | TCR; 15 | EVG; 8 | MMR; 22 | SGS; 9 | SON; 7 | | | | | | 10th | 1304 | |
| 1989 | Gilliland Racing | 24 | Chevy | | | | | | | | | | | PHO; DNQ | | | | | 10th | 1304 | |
| 1990 | Gilliland Racing | 24 | Chevy | MMR; 10 | SON; 28 | SGS; 10 | POR; 5 | EVG; 22 | RAS; 4 | TCR; 19 | MMR; 10 | PHO; DNQ | | | | | | | 7th | 1107 | |
| 1991 | Gilliland Racing | 24 | Pontiac | EVG; 3 | **MMR**; 4 | | SGS; 3 | POR; 5 | EVG; 11 | SSS; 3 | MMR; 4 | | | | | | | | 3rd | 1413 | |
| 1991 | Gilliland Racing | 29 | Pontiac | | | SON; DNQ | | | | | | | | | | | | | 3rd | 1413 | |
| 1991 | Gilliland Racing | 23 | Pontiac | | | | | | | | | PHO; 29 | | | | | | | 3rd | 1413 | |
| 1992 | Gilliland Racing | 24 | Pontiac | MMR; 5 | SGS; 2 | SON; 38 | SHA; 5 | POR; 16 | EVG; 6 | SSS; 4 | CAJ; 4 | TWS; 9 | MMR; 12 | PHO; 29 | | | | | 6th | 1660 | |
| 1993 | Woodland Racing | 88 | Olds | TWS; 43 | | | | | | | | | | | | | | | 8th | 1416 | |
| 1993 | Gilliland Racing | 08 | Chevy | | MMR; 3 | | | | | | | | | | | | | | 8th | 1416 | |
| 1993 | Gilliland Racing | 36 | Chevy | | | SGS; 8 | SON; 32 | **TUS**; 2 | SHA; 7 | EVG; 10 | POR | CBS | SSS | | | MMR; 18 | PHO; DNQ | | 8th | 1416 | |
| 1993 | Gilliland Racing | 36 | Olds | | | | | | | | | | | CAJ; 16 | TCR | | | | 8th | 1416 | |
| 1994 | Gilliland Racing | 36 | Chevy | **MMR**; 3 | **TUS**; 9 | SON; 27 | SGS; 17 | YAK; 3 | MMR; 16 | POR | IND; DNQ | CAJ | TCR | LVS | MMR | PHO | TUS | | 15th | 885 | |
| 1995 | Stroppe Motorsports | 38 | Ford | **TUS**; 3 | MMR; 4 | SON; 42 | CNS; 4 | MMR; 7 | POR; 10 | SGS; 1* | **TUS**; 5 | AMP; 6 | MAD; 2 | POR; 5 | LVS; 10 | SON; 2 | MMR; 18 | PHO | 3rd | 2074 | |
| 1996 | Stroppe Motorsports | 38 | Ford | TUS | AMP | **MMR**; 6 | SON | MAD; 1 | POR; 18 | **TUS**; 2* | EVG; 1 | **CNS**; 14* | MAD; 18 | MMR; 2 | SON; 1 | MMR; 14 | PHO | LVS; 6 | 8th | 1675 | |
| 1997 | Stroppe Motorsports | 38 | Ford | TUS; 15 | AMP; 1* | SON; 24 | TUS; 2 | **MMR**; 1 | LVS; 2* | CAL; 4 | EVG; 5 | **POR**; 1* | PPR; 3 | AMP; 3 | **SON**; 1* | MMR; 9 | LVS; 12 | | 1st | 2190 | |
| 1998 | Hilton Racing | 1 | Ford | TUS; 1 | LVS; 16 | PHO; 23 | CAL; 27 | HPT; 22 | MMR; 1 | AMP; 15 | POR; 2 | CAL; 10 | PPR; 12 | EVG; 1 | **SON**; 22* | MMR; 3 | LVS; 13 | | 6th | 1888 | |
| 1999 | Hilton Racing | 1 | Ford | TUS; 17 | LVS; 29 | PHO; 8 | CAL; 6 | PPR; 27 | **MMR**; 1* | **IRW**; 3 | EVG; 17 | POR; 25 | IRW; 3 | RMR; 1 | LVS; 4 | MMR; 23 | MOT; 21 | | 10th | 1821 | |
| 2002 | David Eshleman | 01 | Chevy | PHO | LVS | CAL; 11 | KAN | EVG | IRW | S99 | RMR | DCS | LVS | | | | | | 43rd | 130 | |

=== ARCA Hooters SuperCar Series ===
(key) (Bold – Pole position awarded by qualifying time. Italics – Pole position earned by points standings or practice time. * – Most laps led.)

ARCA Hooters SuperCar Series results
| Year | Team | No. | Make | 1 | 2 | 3 | 4 | 5 | 6 | 7 | 8 | 9 | 10 | 11 | 12 | 13 | 14 | 15 | 16 | 17 | 18 | 19 | 20 | 21 | AHSCSC | Pts | Ref |
|---|---|---|---|---|---|---|---|---|---|---|---|---|---|---|---|---|---|---|---|---|---|---|---|---|---|---|---|
| 1992 | Gilliland Racing | 24W | Pontiac | DAY | FIF | TWS | TAL | TOL | KIL | POC | MCH | FRS | KIL | NSH | DEL | POC | HPT | FRS | ISF | TOL | DSF | TWS; 9 | SLM | ATL | 88th | - | |
| 1993 | Woodland Racing | 88W | Olds | DAY | FIF | TWS; 43 | TAL | KIL | CMS | FRS | TOL | POC | MCH | FRS | POC | KIL | ISF | DSF | TOL | SLM | WIN | ATL | | | NA | - | |

Achievements
| Preceded by Lance Hooper | NASCAR Winston West Series champion 1997 | Succeeded by Kevin Harvick |
