= John Krebs (racing driver) =

American racing driver (1950–2023)

- Born: October 1, 1950; Long Beach, California, U.S.
- Died: March 16, 2023 (aged 72); Roseville, California, U.S.

NASCAR Cup Series career
- 19 races run over 15 years
- Best finish: 60th (1992, 1993)
- First race: 1982 Budweiser 400 (Riverside)
- Last race: 1994 Save Mart Supermarkets 300 (Sonoma)
Wins	Top tens	Poles
0	0	0

ARCA Menards Series career
- 2 races run over 2 years
- First race: 1992 NASCAR/ARCA Texas World Speedway Shootout (Texas World)
- Last race: 1993 Western Auto Texas Shootout II (Texas World)
Wins	Top tens	Poles
0	1	0

ARCA Menards Series West career
- 141 races run over 20 years
- Best finish: 3rd (1993)
- First race: 1977 Winston Gardena 150 (Gardena)
- Last race: 2003 NAPA 150 by NAPA Belts & Hose/Madera Auto CTR (Madera)
- First win: 1978 Winston Gardena 100 (Gardena)
Wins	Top tens	Poles
1	62	0
- Statistics up to date as of February 19, 2025.

John Arthur Krebs (October 1, 1950 - March 16, 2023) was an American professional stock car racing driver. Hailing from Roseville, California, he was a fifteen-year veteran of NASCAR's Cup Series, competing in nineteen events from 1978 to 1994. He also competed in the Winston West Series for many years, scoring one win in the series in 1978. Additionally, Krebs competed in two ARCA Hooters SuperCar Series races, both combination races with the West Series at Texas World Speedway.

Krebs competed in the first NASCAR race held outside North America, the 1988 Goodyear NASCAR 500 at the Calder Park Thunderdome in Australia, finishing 29th due to engine issus.

Krebs was involved in an accident with Derrike Cope at Sears Point Raceway in 1994 that sent Krebs flipping outside of the racetrack's limits. It would turn out to be the final race of Krebs' Cup Series career, as he failed to qualify for the races at Indianapolis and Phoenix later that season.

Later on Krebs owned a team in the NASCAR K&N Pro Series West. The team, John Krebs Racing, competed in their last race in 2018 with driver Takuma Koga. The team's best finish came at Orange Show Speedway in 2017, where they placed fifth.

== Motorsports career results ==
=== NASCAR ===
(key) (Bold – Pole position awarded by qualifying time. Italics – Pole position earned by points standings or practice time. * – Most laps led.)

==== Winston Cup Series ====
NASCAR Winston Cup Series results
Year	Team	No.	Make	1	2	3	4	5	6	7	8	9	10	11	12	13	14	15	16	17	18	19	20	21	22	23	24	25	26	27	28	29	30	31	NWCC	Pts	Ref
1978	John Krebs Racing	91	Chevy	RSD	DAY	RCH	CAR	ATL	BRI	DAR	NWS	MAR	TAL	DOV	CLT	NSV	RSD	MCH	DAY	NSV	POC	TAL	MCH	BRI	DAR	RCH	DOV	MAR	NWS	CLT	CAR	ATL	ONT; DNQ		NA	-	
1979	John Krebs Racing	91	Buick	RSD; DNQ	DAY	CAR	RCH	ATL	NWS	BRI	DAR	MAR	TAL	NSV	DOV	CLT	TWS	RSD	MCH	DAY	NSV	POC	TAL	MCH	BRI	DAR	RCH	DOV	MAR	CLT	NWS	CAR	ATL	ONT; DNQ	NA	-	
1982	KC Racing	91	Pontiac	DAY	RCH	BRI	ATL	CAR	DAR	NWS	MAR	TAL	NSV	DOV	CLT	POC	RSD; 19	MCH	DAY	NSV	POC	TAL	MCH	BRI	DAR	RCH	DOV	NWS	CLT	MAR	CAR	ATL	RSD; 37		67th	158	
1983	KC Racing	91	Olds	DAY	RCH	CAR	ATL	DAR	NWS	MAR	TAL	NSV	DOV	BRI	CLT	RSD	POC	MCH	DAY	NSV	POC	TAL	MCH	BRI	DAR	RCH	DOV	MAR	NWS	CLT	CAR	ATL	RSD; 32		92nd	67	
1984	KC Racing	91	Olds	DAY	RCH	CAR	ATL	BRI	NWS	DAR	MAR	TAL	NSV	DOV	CLT	RSD; 40	POC	MCH	DAY	NSV	POC	TAL	MCH	BRI	DAR	RCH	DOV	MAR	CLT	NWS	CAR	ATL	RSD; 39		78th	89	
1985	KC Racing	91	Olds	DAY	RCH	CAR	ATL	BRI	DAR	NWS	MAR	TAL	DOV	CLT	RSD; 26	POC	MCH	DAY	POC	TAL	MCH	BRI	DAR	RCH	DOV	MAR	NWS	CLT	CAR	ATL	RSD				82nd	85	
1986	KC Racing	38	Olds	DAY	RCH	CAR	ATL	BRI	DAR	NWS	MAR	TAL	DOV	CLT	RSD; 26	POC	MCH	DAY	POC	TAL	GLN	MCH	BRI	DAR	RCH	DOV	MAR	NWS	CLT	CAR	ATL	RSD; 42			87th	122	
1987	KC Racing	66	Olds	DAY	CAR	RCH	ATL	DAR	NWS	BRI	MAR	TAL	CLT	DOV	POC	RSD; 29	MCH	DAY	POC	TAL	GLN	MCH	BRI	DAR	RCH	DOV	MAR	NWS	CLT	CAR	RSD; DNQ	ATL			90th	76	
1988	KC Racing	66	Olds	DAY	RCH	CAR	ATL	DAR	BRI	NWS	MAR	TAL	CLT	DOV	RSD; 25	POC	MCH	DAY	POC	TAL	GLN	MCH	BRI	DAR	RCH	DOV	MAR	CLT	NWS	CAR					73rd	88	
1988	KC Racing	66W	Olds																												PHO; DNQ	ATL			73rd	88	
1989	KC Racing	99	Pontiac	DAY	CAR	ATL	RCH	DAR	BRI	NWS	MAR	TAL	CLT	DOV	SON; 33	POC	MCH	DAY	POC	TAL	GLN	MCH	BRI	DAR	RCH	DOV	MAR	CLT	NWS	CAR	PHO; DNQ	ATL			91st	64	
1990	KC Racing	99	Pontiac	DAY	RCH	CAR	ATL	DAR	BRI	NWS	MAR	TAL	CLT	DOV	SON; 23	POC	MCH	DAY	POC	TAL	GLN	MCH	BRI	DAR	RCH	DOV	MAR	NWS	CLT	CAR	PHO; 31	ATL			67th	164	
1991	KC Racing	99	Pontiac	DAY	RCH	CAR	ATL	DAR	BRI	NWS	MAR	TAL	CLT	DOV	SON; 38	POC	MCH	DAY	POC	TAL	GLN	MCH	BRI	DAR	RCH	DOV	MAR	NWS	CLT	CAR	PHO; DNQ	ATL			84th	54	
1992	Diamond Ridge Motorsports	99	Pontiac	DAY	CAR	RCH	ATL	DAR	BRI	NWS	MAR	TAL	CLT	DOV	SON; 31	POC	MCH	DAY	POC	TAL	GLN	MCH	BRI	DAR	RCH	DOV	MAR	NWS	CLT	CAR					60th	164	
1992	Diamond Ridge Motorsports	29	Chevy																												PHO; 23	ATL			60th	164	
1993	Diamond Ridge Motorsports	29	Chevy	DAY	CAR	RCH	ATL	DAR	BRI	NWS	MAR	TAL	SON; 34	CLT	DOV	POC	MCH	DAY	NHA																60th	119	
1993	Diamond Ridge Motorsports	99	Chevy																	POC; 35	TAL	GLN													60th	119	
1993	Linro Motorsports	29	Chevy																				MCH; DNQ	BRI	DAR	RCH	DOV	MAR	NWS	CLT	CAR	PHO	ATL		60th	119	
1994	Diamond Ridge Motorsports	9	Chevy	DAY	CAR	RCH	ATL	DAR	BRI	NWS	MAR	TAL	SON; 42	CLT	DOV	POC	MCH	DAY	NHA	POC	TAL														80th	42	
1994	John Krebs Racing	92W	Chevy																			IND; DNQ	GLN	MCH	BRI	DAR	RCH	DOV	MAR	NWS	CLT	CAR	PHO; DNQ	ATL	80th	42	

=== ARCA Hooters SuperCar Series ===
(key) (Bold – Pole position awarded by qualifying time. Italics – Pole position earned by points standings or practice time. * – Most laps led.)

ARCA Hooters SuperCar Series results
Year	Team	No.	Make	1	2	3	4	5	6	7	8	9	10	11	12	13	14	15	16	17	18	19	20	21	AHSCC	Pts	Ref
1992	Diamond Ridge Motorsports	9W	Chevy	DAY	FIF	TWS	TAL	TOL	KIL	POC	MCH	FRS	KIL	NSH	DEL	POC	HPT	FRS	ISF	TOL	DSF	TWS; 4	SLM	ATL	NA	-	
1993	Diamond Ridge Motorsports	29W	Chevy	DAY	FIF	TWS; 22	TAL	KIL	CMS	FRS	TOL	POC	MCH	FRS	POC	KIL	ISF	DSF	TOL	SLM	WIN	ATL			NA	-	
