= South Sound Speedway =

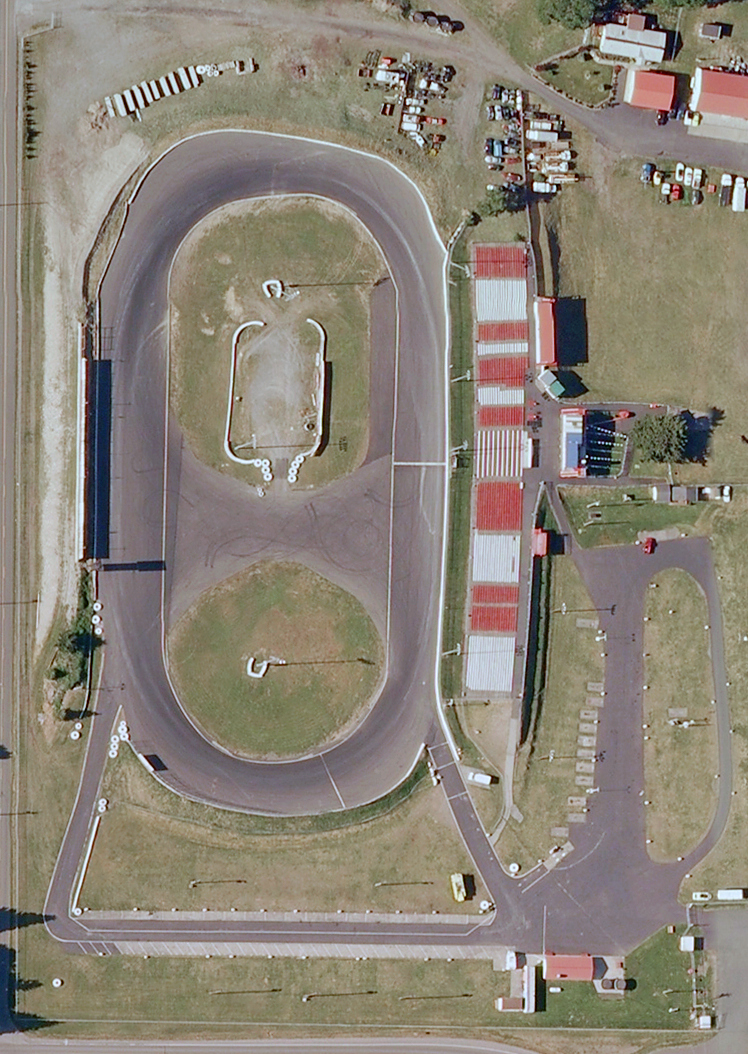
- Speedway in May 2009
- Location: Thurston County, near Rochester, Washington, USA
- Coordinates: 46°49′26″N 122°57′47″W
- Capacity: 4,000
- Owner: Butch and Nick Behn
- Former names: Olympia-Tenino Speedway
- Major events: Former: NASCAR Winston West Series (1991–1993); NASCAR Northwest Series (1985–2002)

Oval
- Surface: Asphalt
- Length: 0.375 mi (0.604 km)
- Turns: 4

South Sound Speedway is a 0.375 mi (0.604 km) oval race track with a Figure 8 course located near Grand Mound and Rochester, Washington.

== History ==
The racetrack, originally called the Olympia-Tenino Speedway, was constructed in 1971 by Dick and Wanda Boness. The track was later be owned by Jerry Cope, the uncle of Derrike Cope. The racetrack was sanctioned for use as a NASCAR site from 1989 until 2002, when the partnership ended due to rising costs.

The track was purchased from Mickey Beadle in 1995 by the Behn family, and an auto racing parts and tire store was opened on the site in 2002, with a repair shop eventually added.

Butch Behn, who remained owner into the late 2010s, purchased a $5 million set of five, self-cleaning public toilets originally for use in Seattle. After the restrooms became an immediate nuisance in the city, Behn paid over $12,000, equivalent to $17,944 in 2025, in 2008 for the German-made commodes during an online auction. Planning to use the facilities at the speedway, the installation costs prevented the toilets from ever being implemented. Remaining in storage, Behn first attempted to sell the toilets in 2016.

== Geography ==
South Sound Speedway is located west of Tenino, Washington on Old Highway 99. The track is listed under a Rochester address.

== Racetrack and site ==
The oval track is 0.375 mi (0.604 km) in length and the course is in a Figure 8 configuration. The track was repaved and the backstretch wall was moved back before the start of the 2001 season. Track times were noticed to immediately fall, placing the lap record of 14.28 seconds at 94.537 miles per hour (152.143 km/h), set by Dan Press of Vader, in jeopardy.

The track is mentioned in a 2003 report to accommodate 4,000 people. A wall on the front stretch of the track was raised by one foot before the 2007 season as a safety measure for spectators.

== Events ==
South Sound Speedway hosts several racing divisions including late model, street stock, Legends, NW baby grand, NW Vintage Modified, and asphalt sprint cars. In the past it hosted the NASCAR Winston West Series and has hosted the Northwest Super Late Model Series once or twice a season.

A signature event at the track was the Miller 200, an annual late model super stock race. The first Miller 200 was held in 1995 and lasted into the early 2010s. Another competition, under the NASCAR Northwest and Raybestos Brakes Northwest series, was the Pepsi 125 held in the early 2000s.

Lower-level, street car races, which included Bumblebees, were introduced by the mid-2000s to help increase attendance. Also introduced during the late 2000s was the Dennis Smitham Memorial 100, a street stock car race showcased annually during Labor Day weekend. Held in honor of Smitham, the first race was held a week after his death in 2007.

== Drivers ==
Notable drivers, such as Greg Biffle, have raced at South Sound Speedway. Other drivers of note from the NASCAR K&N Pro Series are Rick Carelli, Ron Eaton, Ron Hornaday Jr., Robert Sprague, Dirk Stephens, and sisters Angela and Amber Cope. The Cope sisters began their careers by training at South Sound Speedway as teenagers.

== Images ==
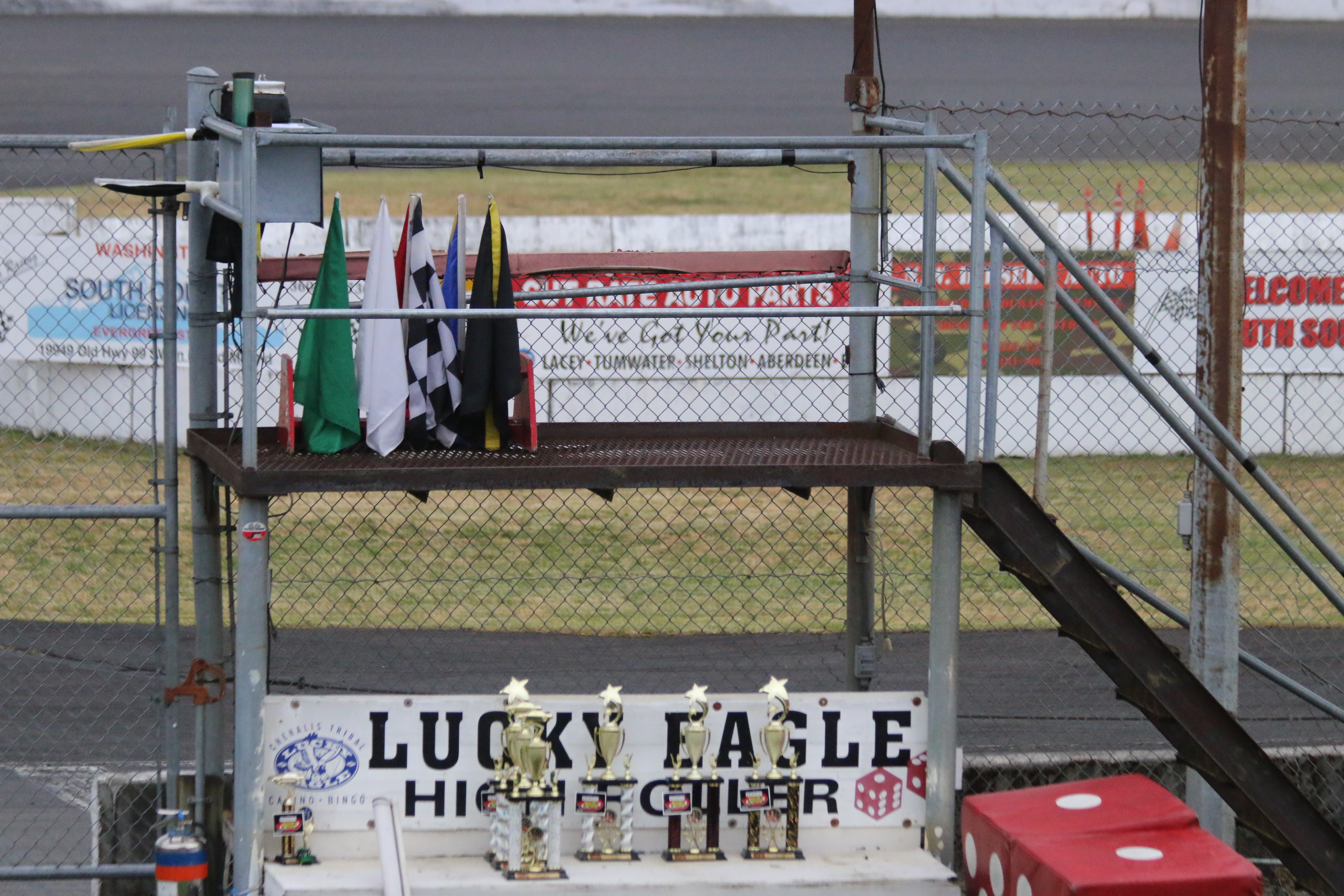
Flagstand

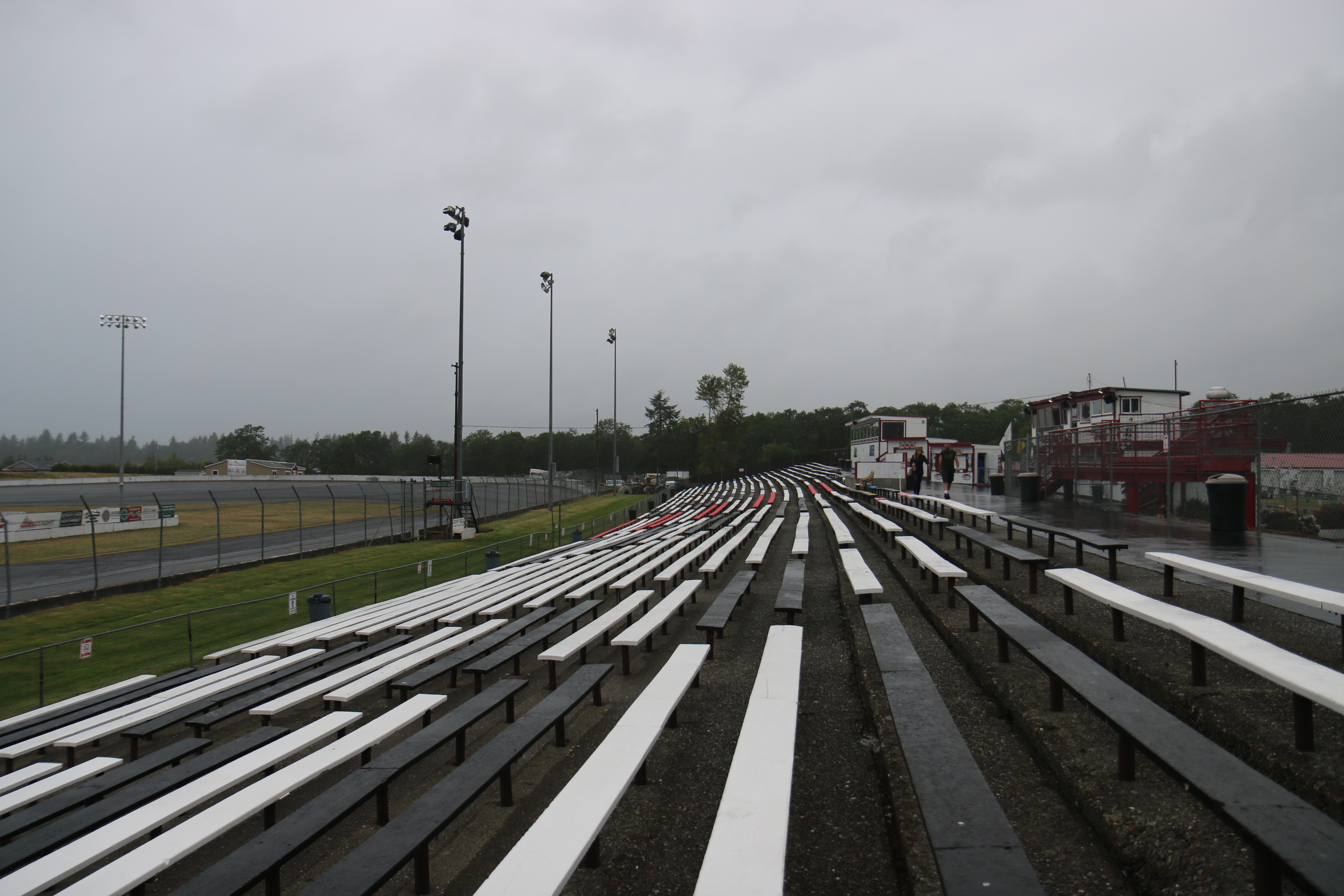
Grandstands

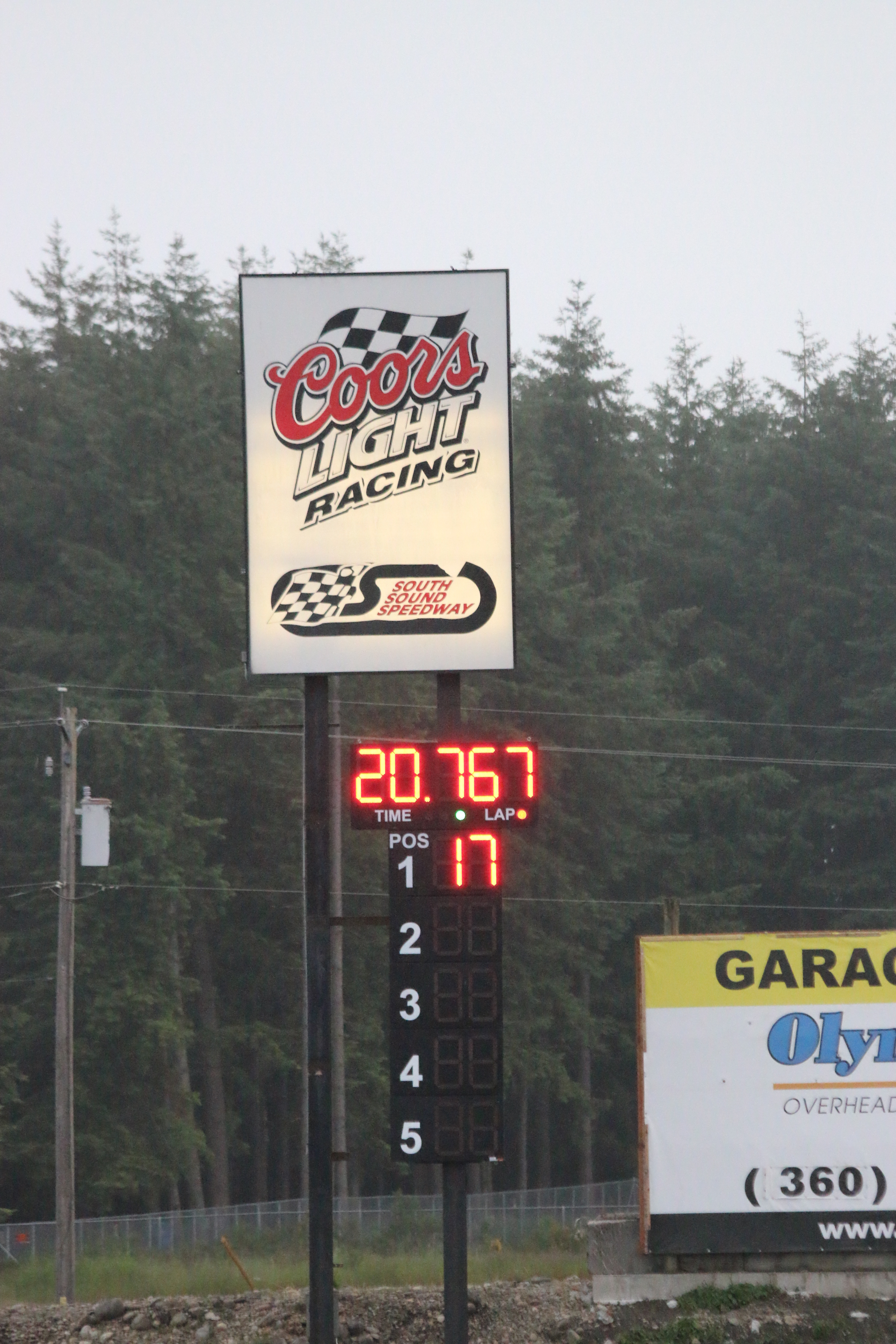
Scoreboard

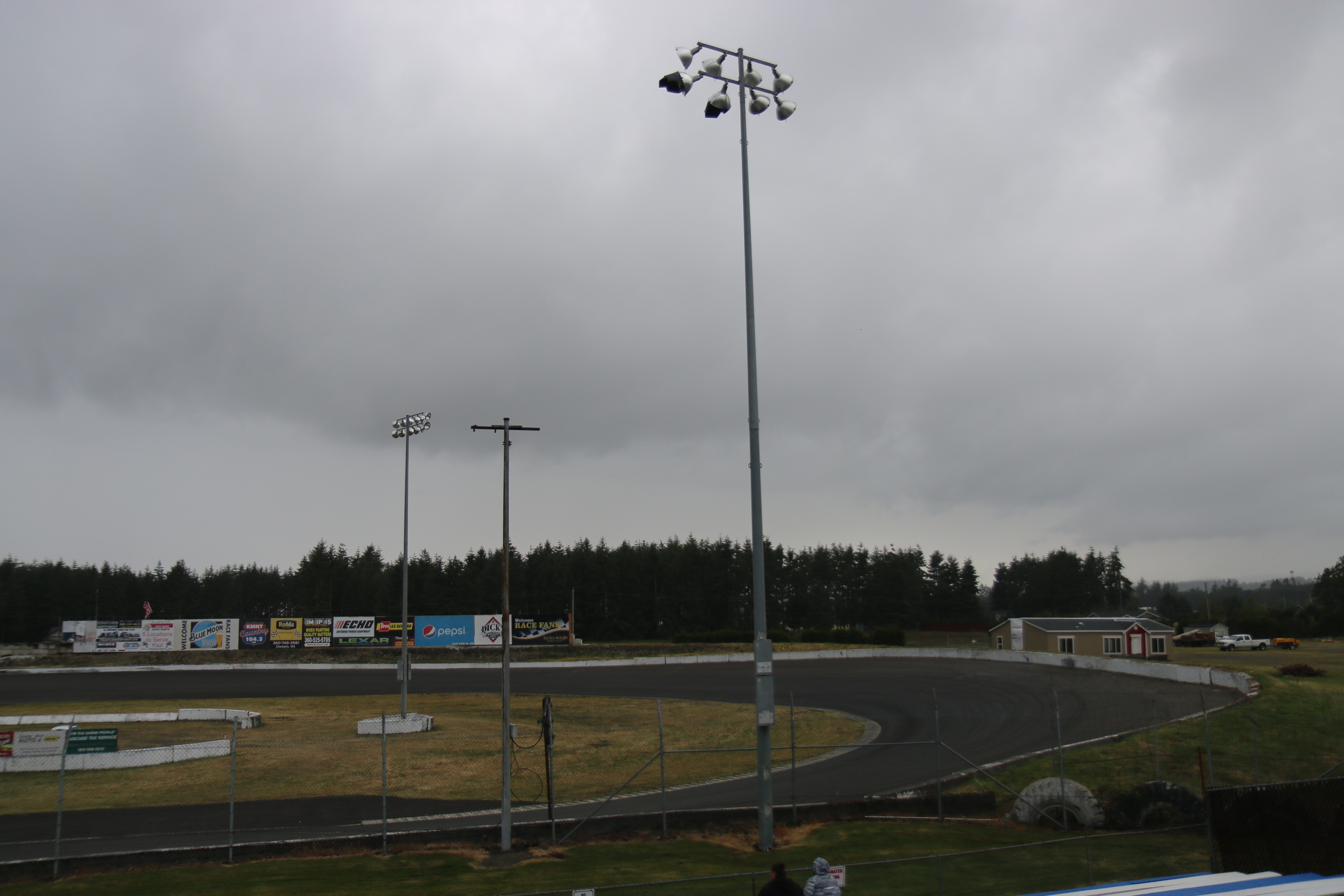
Turns 1 and 2

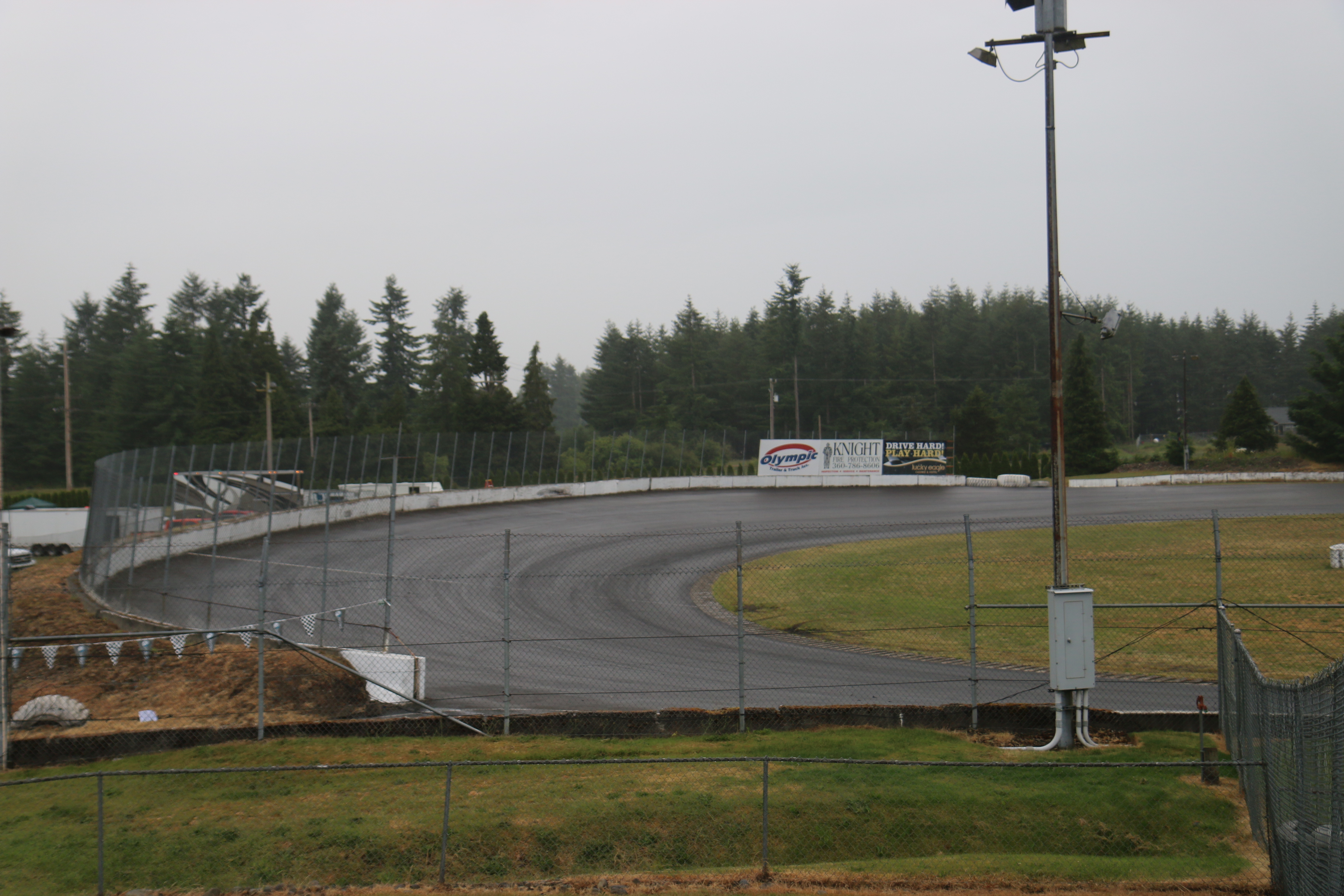
Turns 3 and 4

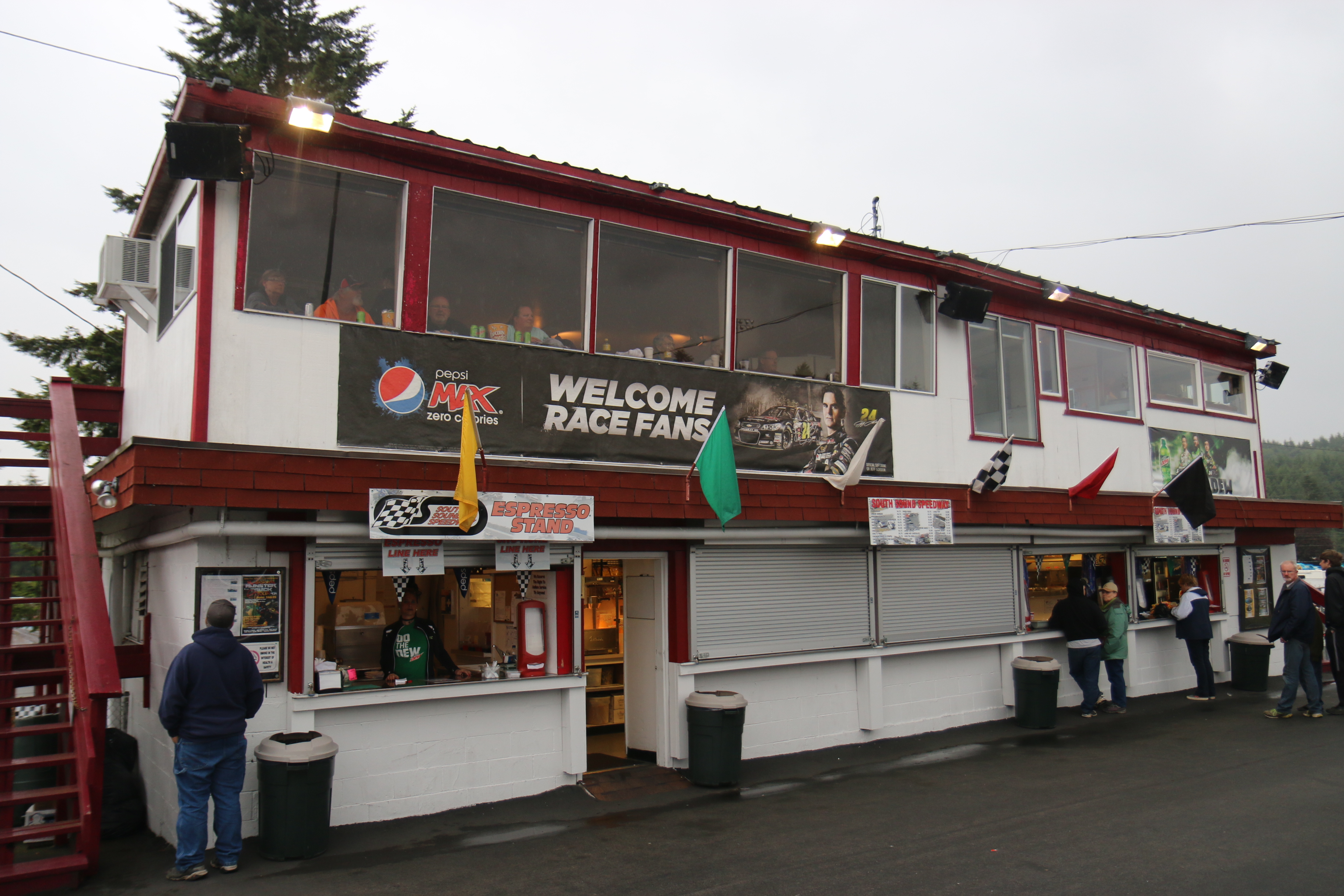
Scoring tower

== See also ==
- List of auto racing tracks in the United States
- Short track motor racing
