= Bill Schmitt =

American racing driver (1936–2014)

- Born: February 13, 1936; Redding, California, U.S.
- Died: November 8, 2014 (aged 78)

NASCAR Cup Series career
- 44 races run over 19 years
- Best finish: 42nd (1980)
- First race: 1975 Winston Western 500 (Riverside)
- Last race: 1993 Save Mart Supermarkets 300K (Sonoma)
Wins	Top tens	Poles
0	6	0

ARCA Menards Series West career
- 236 races run over 20 years
- Best finish: 1st (1977, 1979, 1989, 1990)
- First race: 1974 Victoria 150 (Victoria)
- Last race: 1993 Meineke Discount Mufflers 300 (Mesa Marin)
- First win: 1975 Coca-Cola 150 (Portland)
- Last win: 1992 Thrifty Food & Gas/Winston 200 (Cajon)
Wins	Top tens	Poles
19	147	14
- Statistics up to date as of March 18, 2025.

Bill Schmitt (born February 13, 1936 – November 8, 2014) was an American professional stock car racing driver who competed in the NASCAR Winston Cup Series and the NASCAR Winston West Series.

Schmitt was a multiple time champion of the West Series, having won four championships and nineteen races from 1974 to 1993.

Schmitt competed in the first NASCAR race held outside North America, the 1988 Goodyear NASCAR 500 at Australia's Calder Park Thunderdome, finishing 30th due to engine issues.

Schmitt also competed in series such as the NASCAR Northwest Series, the NASCAR Southwest Series, the USAC Stock Car Series, and the Trans Am Championship.

== Motorsports career results ==
=== NASCAR ===
(key) (Bold - Pole position awarded by qualifying time. Italics - Pole position earned by points standings or practice time. * – Most laps led.)

==== Winston Cup Series ====
NASCAR Winston Cup Series results
Year	Team	No.	Make	1	2	3	4	5	6	7	8	9	10	11	12	13	14	15	16	17	18	19	20	21	22	23	24	25	26	27	28	29	30	31	NWCC	Pts	Ref
1975	Schmitt Motorsports	73W	Chevy	RSD; 18	DAY	RCH	CAR	BRI	ATL	NWS	DAR	MAR	TAL	NSV	DOV	CLT																			58th	315	
1975	Schmitt Motorsports	73	Chevy														RSD; 8	MCH	DAY	NSV	POC	TAL	MCH	DAR	DOV	NWS	MAR	CLT	RCH	CAR	BRI	ATL	ONT; 33		58th	315	
1976	Schmitt Motorsports	73	Chevy	RSD; 10	DAY	CAR	RCH	BRI	ATL	NWS	DAR	MAR	TAL	NSV	DOV	CLT	RSD	MCH	DAY	NSV	POC	TAL	MCH	BRI	DAR	RCH	DOV	MAR	NWS	CLT	CAR	ATL	ONT; 26		72nd	219	
1977	Schmitt Motorsports	73	Chevy	RSD; 19	DAY	RCH	CAR	ATL	NWS	DAR	BRI	MAR	TAL	NSV	DOV	CLT	RSD; 30	MCH	DAY	NSV	POC	TAL	MCH	BRI	DAR	RCH	DOV	MAR	NWS	CLT	CAR	ATL	ONT; 41		65th	219	
1978	Schmitt Motorsports	73	Chevy	RSD; 32	DAY	RCH	CAR	ATL	BRI	DAR	NWS	MAR	TAL	DOV	CLT	NSV																			52nd	350	
1978	Schmitt Motorsports	73	Olds														RSD; 8	MCH	DAY	NSV	POC	TAL	MCH	BRI	DAR	RCH	DOV	MAR	NWS	CLT	CAR	ATL	ONT; 14		52nd	350	
1979	Schmitt Motorsports	73	Olds	RSD; 4	DAY	CAR	RCH	ATL	NWS	BRI	DAR	MAR	TAL	NSV	DOV	CLT	TWS	RSD; 30	MCH	DAY	NSV	POC	TAL	MCH	BRI	DAR	RCH	DOV	MAR	CLT	NWS	CAR	ATL	ONT; 18	50th	342	
1980	Schmitt Motorsports	73	Olds	RSD; 5	DAY; 23	RCH	CAR	ATL	BRI	DAR	NWS	MAR	TAL	NSV	DOV	CLT	TWS	RSD; 13	MCH	DAY	NSV	POC	TAL	MCH	BRI	DAR	RCH	DOV	NWS	MAR	CLT	CAR	ATL	ONT; 11	42nd	503	
1981	Schmitt Motorsports	73	Buick	RSD; 22	DAY	RCH	CAR	ATL	BRI	NWS	DAR	MAR	TAL	NSV	DOV	CLT	TWS	RSD; 24	MCH	DAY	NSV	POC	TAL	MCH	BRI	DAR	RCH	DOV	MAR	NWS	CLT	CAR	ATL	RSD; 14	53rd	314	
1982	Schmitt Motorsports	73	Buick	DAY	RCH	BRI	ATL	CAR	DAR	NWS	MAR	TAL	NSV	DOV	CLT	POC	RSD; 24	MCH	DAY	NSV	POC	TAL	MCH	BRI	DAR	RCH	DOV	NWS	CLT	MAR	CAR	ATL	RSD; 21		64th	191	
1983	Schmitt Motorsports	73	Chevy	DAY	RCH	CAR	ATL	DAR	NWS	MAR	TAL	NSV	DOV	BRI	CLT	RSD; 9	POC	MCH	DAY	NSV	POC	TAL	MCH	BRI	DAR	RCH	DOV	MAR	NWS	CLT	CAR	ATL	RSD; 40		67th	181	
1984	Schmitt Motorsports	73	Chevy	DAY	RCH	CAR	ATL	BRI	NWS	DAR	MAR	TAL	NSV	DOV	CLT	RSD; 39	POC	MCH	DAY	NSV	POC	TAL	MCH	BRI	DAR	RCH	DOV	MAR	CLT	NWS	CAR	ATL			59th	170	
1984	Schmitt Motorsports	73	Buick																														RSD; 13		59th	170	
1985	Schmitt Motorsports	73	Chevy	DAY	RCH	CAR	ATL	BRI	DAR	NWS	MAR	TAL	DOV	CLT	RSD; 34	POC	MCH	DAY	POC	TAL	MCH	BRI	DAR	RCH	DOV	MAR	NWS	CLT	CAR	ATL	RSD; 15				61st	179	
1986	Schmitt Motorsports	73	Chevy	DAY	RCH	CAR	ATL	BRI	DAR	NWS	MAR	TAL	DOV	CLT	RSD; 18	POC	MCH	DAY	POC	TAL	GLN	MCH	BRI	DAR	RCH	DOV	MAR	NWS	CLT	CAR	ATL	RSD; 14			64th	230	
1987	Schmitt Motorsports	73	Chevy	DAY	CAR	RCH	ATL	DAR	NWS	BRI	MAR	TAL	CLT	DOV	POC	RSD; 33	MCH	DAY	POC	TAL	GLN	MCH	BRI	DAR	RCH	DOV	MAR	NWS	CLT	CAR	RSD; 36	ATL			76th	119	
1988	Schmitt Motorsports	73	Chevy	DAY	RCH	CAR	ATL	DAR	BRI	NWS	MAR	TAL	CLT	DOV	RSD; 12	POC	MCH	DAY	POC	TAL	GLN	MCH	BRI	DAR	RCH	DOV	MAR	CLT	NWS	CAR					56th	179	
1988	Schmitt Motorsports	03	Chevy																												PHO; 37	ATL			56th	179	
1989	Schmitt Motorsports	73	Chevy	DAY	CAR	ATL	RCH	DAR	BRI	NWS	MAR	TAL	CLT	DOV	SON; 17	POC	MCH	DAY	POC	TAL	GLN	MCH	BRI	DAR	RCH	DOV	MAR	CLT	NWS	CAR	PHO; 26	ATL			55th	197	
1990	Schmitt Motorsports	73	Chevy	DAY	RCH	CAR	ATL	DAR	BRI	NWS	MAR	TAL	CLT	DOV	SON; 20	POC	MCH	DAY	POC	TAL	GLN	MCH	BRI	DAR	RCH	DOV	MAR	NWS	CLT	CAR	PHO; 18	ATL			59th	212	
1991	Schmitt Motorsports	73	Ford	DAY	RCH	CAR	ATL	DAR	BRI	NWS	MAR	TAL	CLT	DOV	SON; 13	POC	MCH	DAY	POC	TAL	GLN	MCH	BRI	DAR	RCH	DOV	MAR	NWS	CLT	CAR	PHO; 37	ATL			57th	176	
1992	Schmitt Motorsports	9	Ford	DAY	CAR	RCH	ATL	DAR	BRI	NWS	MAR	TAL	CLT	DOV	SON; 24	POC	MCH	DAY	POC	TAL	GLN	MCH	BRI	DAR	RCH	DOV	MAR	NWS	CLT	CAR					63rd	155	
1992	Schmitt Motorsports	73	Ford																												PHO; 33	ATL			63rd	155	
1993	Schmitt Motorsports	73	Ford	DAY	CAR	RCH	ATL	DAR	BRI	NWS	MAR	TAL	SON; 31	CLT	DOV	POC	MCH	DAY	NHA	POC	TAL	GLN	MCH	BRI	DAR	RCH	DOV	MAR	NWS	CLT	CAR	PHO	ATL		77th	70	

===== Daytona 500 =====
Year	Team	Manufacturer	Start	Finish
1980	Schmitt Motorsports	Chevrolet	20	23
