= McAnally–Hilgemann Racing =

Stock car racing team

- Owner(s): Bill McAnally; Mike Curb; William Hilgemann
- Base: Roseville, California; Statesville, North Carolina
- Series: NASCAR Craftsman Truck Series; ARCA Menards Series; ARCA Menards Series West
- Race drivers: Truck Series; 18. Nick Sanchez; 19. Daniel Hemric; 81. TBA; 91. Christian Eckes; TBA. Hailie Deegan (part-time); ARCA Menards Series; 16. Hailie Deegan (part-time); 81. Mason Massey (part-time); ARCA Menards Series West; 16. Hailie Deegan; 19. Mason Massey
- Manufacturer: Chevrolet

Career
- Debut: Whelen All-American Series; 1990; Menards Series West: 1992; Craftsman Truck Series; 2000; Menards Series East: 2014
- Latest race: Nextel Cup Series: 2004 Dodge/Save Mart 350 (Sonoma); Craftsman Truck Series: 2026 Craftsman 200 (Homestead); ARCA Menards Series: 2025 General Tire 150 (Phoenix); ARCA Menards Series East: 2020 Skip's Western Outfitters 175 (New Smyrna); ARCA Menards Series West: 2026 NAPA Auto Parts 150 (Bakersfield)
- Drivers' Championships: Total: 12; NASCAR Nextel Cup Series: 0 NASCAR Craftsman Truck Series: 0 ARCA Menards Series: 0 ARCA Menards Series East: 0 ARCA Menards Series West: 11; 1999, 2000, 2001, 2008, 2010, 2015, 2016, 2017, 2019, 2020, 2021; NASCAR Whelen All American Series: 1; 1990
- Race victories: Total: 123; Nextel Cup Series: 0 Craftsman Truck Series: 10; ARCA Menards Series: 0 ARCA Menards Series East: 9 ARCA Menards Series West: 104
- Pole positions: Total: 102; Nextel Cup Series: 0 Craftsman Truck Series: 13; ARCA Menards Series: 0 ARCA Menards Series East: 6 ARCA Menards Series West: 83

McAnally–Hilgemann Racing (MHR), also known as Bill McAnally Racing (BMR), is an American professional stock car racing team that competes full-time in the NASCAR Craftsman Truck Series. The team is based in Roseville, California, and is owned by Bill McAnally (in Truck, is co-owned by William Hilgemann). In the NASCAR Truck Series, the team fields four trucks full-time: No. 18 Chevrolet Silverado for Nick Sanchez, the No. 19 for Daniel Hemric, the No. 81 for multiple drivers, and the No. 91 for Christian Eckes.

The team also races full-time in the ARCA Menards Series West fielding the No. 16 Chevrolet SS full-time for Hailie Deegan, the No. 19 Chevrolet SS full-time for Mason Massey, as well as part-time in the ARCA Menards Series, fielding the No. 16 Chevrolet SS part-time for Hailie Deegan and the No. 81 Chevrolet SS part-time for Mason Massey.

== History ==
Bill McAnally first started racing in the Late Model series at All American Speedway in 1990. While preparing to begin his Late Model career, he reached out to NAPA to try getting some sponsorship for his car. They agreed to sponsor him, and McAnally won the Late Model division championship in the Whelen All-American Series at the track. NAPA has continued to sponsor the team to this day.

McAnally moved up to the ARCA Menards Series West (then called the NASCAR Winston West Series), making two starts that season. The following season he bumped that up to five starts. The 1994 season got off to a bad start when he lost his car and equipment to vandals the night before the season opener. Despite this, McAnally still managed to race in six events while rebuilding his team that year. In 1995, he finally reached his dream of running a full regular-season schedule, finishing ninth in the championship standings. He followed that up with another ninth-place finish in the standings the following year. In total, McAnally made 56 starts between 1992 and 1998 while also working a full-time job as a lineman for a utility company.

In 1999, McAnally was preparing to retire from racing when a chance meeting took place with a father and son who wanted to go racing. That meeting resulted in Sean Woodside racing for McAnally in 1999. He won the first race of the season at Tucson and went on to win the series championship. McAnally next opened a seat for Brendan Gaughan, who went on to win back-to-back titles for BMR in 2000 and 2001 and opened a NASCAR Craftsman Truck Series team in the same years. McAnally would add two more titles with driver Eric Holmes in 2008 and 2010. In 2015 and 2016 the team saw even more success, winning back-to-back championships with Chris Eggleston and Todd Gilliland respectively. This made McAnally just the third car owner in the history of the series to win consecutive titles on two separate occasions. They came back just as strong in 2017, winning another championship with Todd Gilliland. McAnally is the only owner in NASCAR history to have eight championships at the touring series level of NASCAR.

On January 13, 2020, BMR announced a partnership with Bill Hilgemann to form McAnally–Hilgemann Racing. The team fielded the No. 19 Tundra full-time in the Truck Series for Kraus. The following day, the team revealed a new Menards Series West driver lineup of Gio Scelzi, Jesse Love, Holley Hollan, and Gracie Trotter.

In 2021, McAnally's team participated with the Nos. 1 (Jolynn Wilkinson), 4 (Dylan Lupton, Eric Nascimento), 5 (Sebastian Arias), 16 (Jesse Love), 19 (Derek Kraus, Eric Nascimento, Amber Balcaen, Jolynn Wilkinson, Sebastian Arias), and 99 (Cole Moore).

In 2022, McAnally-Hilgemann and McAnally's team switched to Chevrolet, having a technical alliance with GMS Racing. In trucks, Colby Howard ran the No. 91 (reverse of No. 19) full-time, and Jake Garcia drove the No. 35 (his late model number) part-time. In ARCA West, Austin Herzog made his first full-time appearance, but was replaced by Landen Lewis after five rounds.

For 2023, Christian Eckes ran the No. 19 full-time while 18-year-old rookie Jake Garcia ran the No. 35 full-time except for Daytona which was run by Chase Elliott, as Garcia was ineligible for the restrictor plate race due to not being 18 yet. Eckes scored wins at Atlanta, Darlington and Kansas.

== Nextel Cup Series ==
=== Car No. 00 history ===
In 2003, McAnally fielded the No. 00 Chevrolet at Infineon Raceway with Jim Inglebright as the driver.

==== Car No. 00 results ====
Year	Driver	No.	Make	1	2	3	4	5	6	7	8	9	10	11	12	13	14	15	16	17	18	19	20	21	22	23	24	25	26	27	28	29	30	31	32	33	34	35	36	Owners	Pts	Ref
2003	Jim Inglebright	00	Chevy	DAY	CAR	LVS	ATL	DAR	BRI	TEX	TAL	MAR	CAL	RCH	CLT	DOV	POC	MCH	SON; DNQ	DAY	CHI	NHA	POC	IND	GLN	MCH	BRI	DAR	RCH	NHA	DOV	TAL	KAN	CLT	MAR	ATL	PHO	CAR	HOM	72nd	22	

=== Car No. 02 history ===
In 1996, Bill McAnally attempted his Winston Cup Series debut, attempting races in the No. 02 Chevrolet at Sears Point and Phoenix.

==== Car No. 02 results ====
Year	Driver	No.	Make	1	2	3	4	5	6	7	8	9	10	11	12	13	14	15	16	17	18	19	20	21	22	23	24	25	26	27	28	29	30	31	Owners	Pts
1996	Bill McAnally	02	Chevy	DAY	CAR	RCH	ATL	DAR	BRI	NWS	MAR	TAL	SON; DNQ	CLT	DOV	POC	MCH	DAY	NHA	POC	TAL	IND	GLN	MCH	BRI	DAR	RCH	DOV	MAR	NWS	CLT	CAR	PHO; DNQ	ATL	N/A	0

=== Car No. 16 history ===
In 1997, McAnally fielded the No. 16 Chevrolet at Sears Point for himself.

==== Car No. 16 results ====
Year	Driver	No.	Make	1	2	3	4	5	6	7	8	9	10	11	12	13	14	15	16	17	18	19	20	21	22	23	24	25	26	27	28	29	30	31	32	Owners	Pts
1997	Bill McAnally	16	Chevy	DAY	CAR	RCH	ATL	DAR	TEX	BRI	MAR	SON; DNQ	TAL	CLT	DOV	POC	MCH	CAL	DAY	NHA	POC	IND	GLN	MCH	BRI	DAR	RCH	NHA	DOV	MAR	CLT	TAL	CAR	PHO	ATL	76th	1

=== Car No. 61 history ===
In 2004, McAnally fielded the No. 61 Chevrolet at Infineon Raceway with Austin Cameron as the driver.

==== Car No. 61 results ====
Year	Driver	No.	Make	1	2	3	4	5	6	7	8	9	10	11	12	13	14	15	16	17	18	19	20	21	22	23	24	25	26	27	28	29	30	31	32	33	34	35	36	Owners	Pts
2004	Austin Cameron	61	Chevy	DAY	CAR	LVS	ATL	DAR	BRI	TEX	MAR	TAL	CAL	RCH	CLT	DOV	POC	MCH	SON; 38	DAY	CHI	NHA	POC	IND	GLN	MCH	BRI	CAL	RCH	NHA	DOV	TAL	KAN	CLT	MAR	ATL	PHO	DAR	HOM	72nd	49

== Craftsman Truck Series ==
=== Truck No. 16 history ===
In 2025, the team fielded the No. 16 truck for Christian Eckes at Richmond and New Hampshire. On September 29, 2025, the team signed Kris Wright for the No. 16 truck at Charlotte Roval and Talladega.

==== Truck No. 16 results ====
Year	Driver	No.	Make	1	2	3	4	5	6	7	8	9	10	11	12	13	14	15	16	17	18	19	20	21	22	23	24	25	Owners	Pts
2025	Christian Eckes	16	Chevy	DAY	ATL	LVS	HOM	MAR	BRI	CAR	TEX	KAN	NWS	CLT	NSH	MCH	POC	LRP	IRP	GLN	RCH; 12	DAR	BRI	NHA; 9					24th	430
2025	Kris Wright	16	Chevy																						ROV; 22	TAL; 11	MAR	PHO	24th	430

=== Truck No. 18 history ===
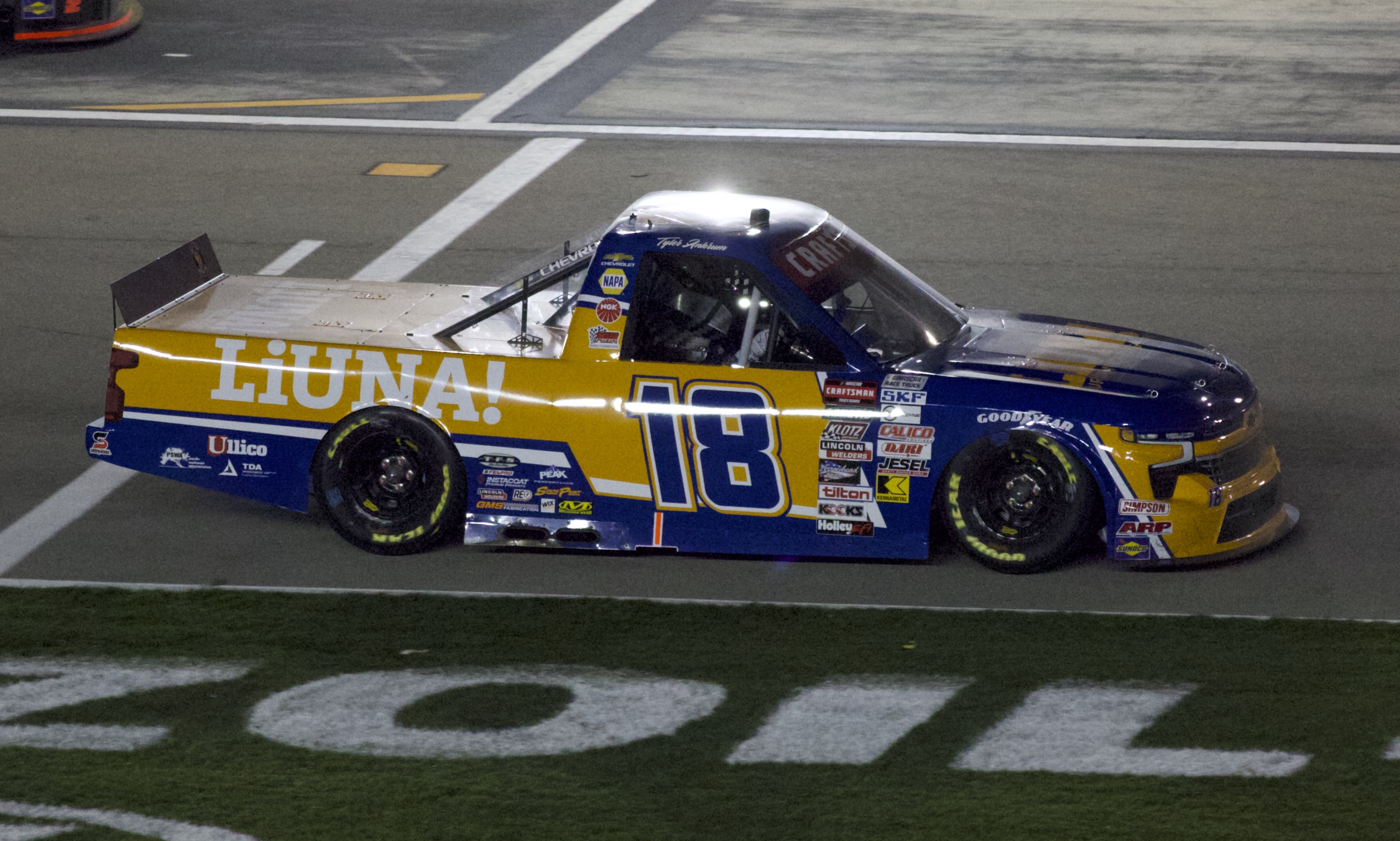
Ankrum's No. 18 truck at Las Vegas Motor Speedway in 2024.

In December 2023, it was announced that Tyler Ankrum would compete for MHR full-time, driving the No. 18 truck. Ankrum was able to qualify for the Truck Series Playoffs, eventually advancing to the Round of 8.

Ankrum started the 2025 season with a 34th place DNF at Daytona. Two months later, he broke a 130-race winless drought at Rockingham.. The win locked him into the playoffs and he advanced to the Championship 4, finishing 14th at Phoenix and 4th in points.

Ankrum started the 2026 season with a ninth place finish at Daytona. On October 9, 2026, Ankrum announced that he would not return to the MHR in 2027.

On November 12, 2026, it was announced that Nick Sanchez would drive the No. 18 truck full-time for the 2027 season.

==== Truck No. 18 results ====
Year	Driver	No.	Make	1	2	3	4	5	6	7	8	9	10	11	12	13	14	15	16	17	18	19	20	21	22	23	24	25	Owners	Pts
2024	Tyler Ankrum	18	Chevy	DAY; 11	ATL; 7*	LVS; 2	BRI; 5	COA; 25	MAR; 5	TEX; 34	KAN; 20	DAR; 26	NWS; 8	CLT; 32	GTW; 15	NSH; 5	POC; 14	IRP; 4	RCH; 6	MLW; 6	BRI; 10	KAN; 14	TAL; 14	HOM; 5	MAR; 8	PHO; 33			9th	2183
2025	Tyler Ankrum	18	Chevy	DAY; 34	ATL; 3	LVS; 10	HOM; 4	MAR; 2	BRI; 4	CAR; 1	TEX; 4	KAN; 16	NWS; 3	CLT; 12	NSH; 17	MCH; 24	POC; 26	LRP; 10	IRP; 8	GLN; 5	RCH; 11	DAR; 7	BRI; 20	NHA; 11	ROV; 9	TAL; 6	MAR; 9	PHO; 14	5th	2241
2026	Tyler Ankrum	18	Chevy	DAY; 9	ATL; 14	STP; 31	DAR; 24	CAR; 6	BRI; 13	TEX; 15	GLN; 17	DOV; 25	CLT; 20	NSH; 5	MCH; 10	COR; 31	LRP; 25	NWS; 19	IRP; 9	RCH; 11	NHA; 16	BRI; 13	KAN; 25	CLT; 9	PHO; 13	TAL; 2	MAR; 7	HOM; 34	17th	581

=== Truck No. 19 history ===
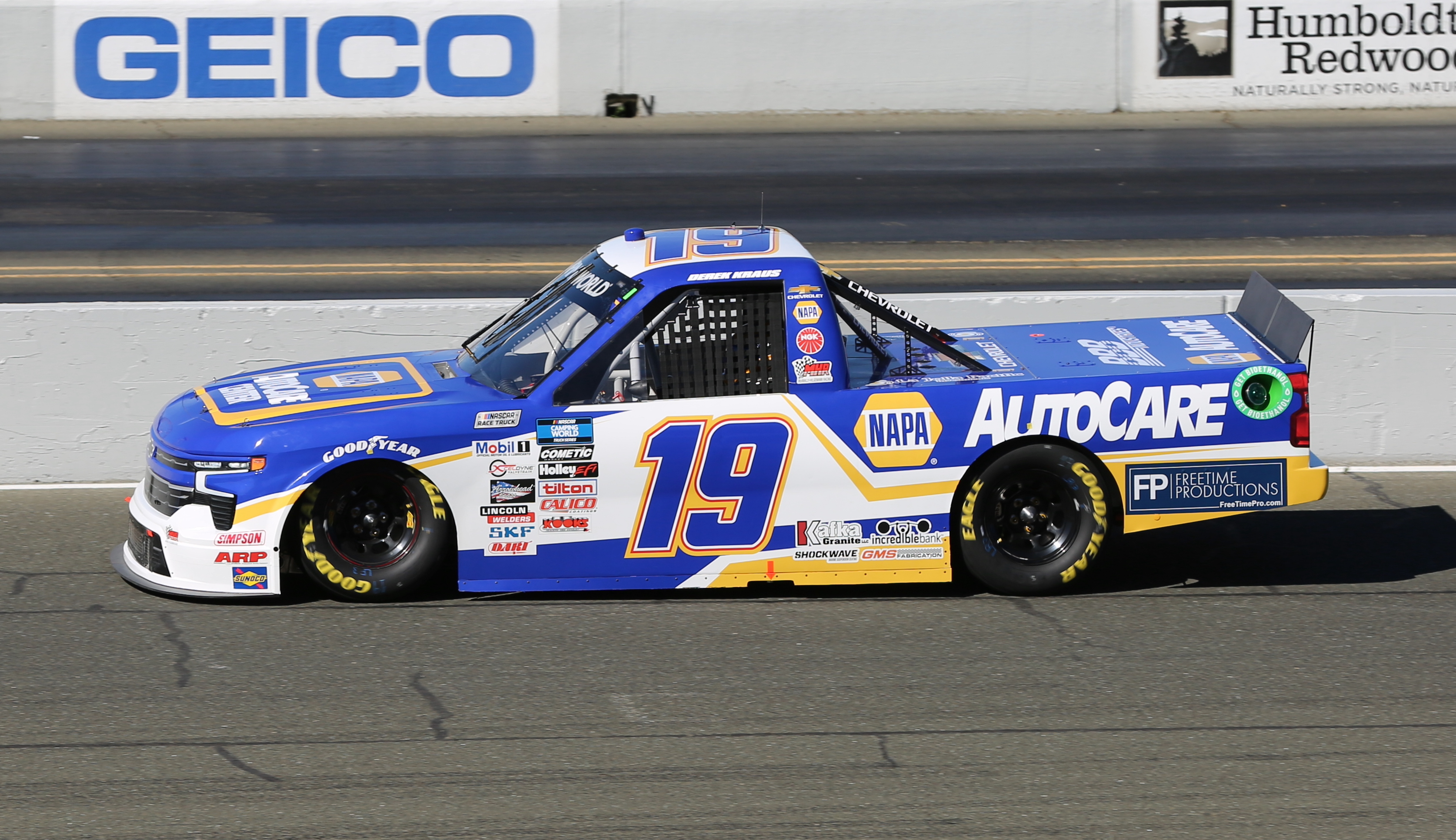
Kraus's No. 19 truck at Sonoma Raceway in 2022

In November 2018, it was announced that BMR would reopen a Camping World Truck Series team debuting again at ISM Raceway fielding the No. 19 Toyota Tundra for Derek Kraus. After finishing in the top-ten, BMR expanded its inventory to three trucks and committed to running a four-race schedule with Kraus in 2019.

The team began a full-time schedule in 2020 with Kraus.

In 2022, the team began running Chevrolet Silverados after having run with Toyota since their debut.

On December 6, 2022, the team announced that they had signed Christian Eckes to drive the No. 19 in 2023. Eckes started the 2023 season with a third-place finish at Daytona. He then scored wins at Atlanta, Darlington, and Kansas. Eckes was eliminated at the conclusion of the Round of 8 at Homestead. He won two weeks later at Phoenix and finished fifth in the final points standings.

Eckes started the 2024 season with a tenth-place finish at Daytona. Throughout the season, he won at Bristol, Martinsville, and Nashville, and claimed the regular season championship. During the playoffs, Eckes won at Martinsville to make the Championship 4. On November 20, with Eckes moving to the Xfinity Series, former Cup Series driver and 2021 NASCAR Xfinity Series champion Daniel Hemric was announced as the new driver of the No. 19 truck for 2025 season.

Hemric started the 2025 season with a seventh-place finish at Daytona. Over a month later, he scored his first career Truck Series victory at Martinsville. The win locked him into the playoffs, and he managed to advance to the round of 8. He finished the season 9th in the standings after three DNFs in the last three races of the season.

Hemric started the 2026 season with a 26th place finish at Daytona.

==== Truck No. 19 results ====
Year	Driver	No.	Make	1	2	3	4	5	6	7	8	9	10	11	12	13	14	15	16	17	18	19	20	21	22	23	24	25	Owners	Pts
2018	Derek Kraus	19	Toyota	DAY	ATL	LVS	MAR	DOV	KAN	CLT	TEX	IOW	GTW	CHI	KEN	ELD	POC	MCH	BRI	MSP	LVS	TAL	MAR	TEX	PHO; 8	HOM			51st	30
2019	Derek Kraus	19	Toyota	DAY	ATL	LVS	MAR; 18	TEX	DOV; 8	KAN	CLT	TEX	IOW	GTW	CHI	KEN	POC	ELD	MCH	BRI	MSP	LVS; 27	TAL	MAR	PHO; 31	HOM; DNQ			43rd	64
2020	Derek Kraus	19	Toyota	DAY; 4	LVS; 22	CLT; 16	ATL; 7	HOM; 15	POC; 10	KEN; 8	TEX; 11	KAN; 5	KAN; 7	MCH; 8	DRC; 30	DOV; 10	GTW; 13	DAR; 2	RCH; 23	BRI; 15	LVS; 30	TAL; 10*	KAN; 9	TEX; 9	MAR; 10	PHO; 24			11th	645
2021	Derek Kraus	19	Toyota	DAY; 33	DRC; 7	LVS; 32	ATL; 13	BRD; 38	RCH; 15	KAN; 28	DAR; 35	COA; 21	CLT; 8	TEX; 13	NSH; 35*	POC; 10	KNX; 5	GLN; 21	GTW; 20	DAR; 16	BRI; 13	LVS; 12	TAL; 20	MAR; 24	PHO; 15				14th	480
2022	Derek Kraus	19	Chevy	DAY; 26	LVS; 24	ATL; 9	COA; 12	MAR; 14	BRD; 29	DAR; 19	KAN; 8	TEX; 36	CLT; 12	GTW; 7	SON; 27	KNX; 6	NSH; 11	MOH; 8	POC; 9	IRP; 14	RCH; 12	KAN; 21	BRI; 6	TAL; 13	HOM; 15	PHO; 11			13th	595
2023	Christian Eckes	19	Chevy	DAY; 3*	LVS; 6	ATL; 1	COA; 30	TEX; 15	BRD; 30	MAR; 15	KAN; 30	DAR; 1*	NWS; 25	CLT; 6	GTW; 2	NSH; 23	MOH; 3	POC; 7	RCH; 11	IRP; 2	MLW; 3	KAN; 1	BRI; 2*	TAL; 19	HOM; 20	PHO; 1			5th	2319
2024	Christian Eckes	19	Chevy	DAY; 10	ATL; 32	LVS; 6	BRI; 1*	COA; 8	MAR; 1*	TEX; 4	KAN; 3	DAR; 4	NWS; 6	CLT; 10	GTW; 2	NSH; 1**	POC; 3	IRP; 2*	RCH; 2	MLW; 3*	BRI; 4	KAN; 3	TAL; 6	HOM; 9	MAR; 1*	PHO; 3			3rd	4034
2025	Daniel Hemric	19	Chevy	DAY; 7	ATL; 16	LVS; 13	HOM; 5	MAR; 1	BRI; 13	CAR; 3	TEX; 2	KAN; 10	NWS; 4	CLT; 8	NSH; 4	MCH; 27	POC; 5	LRP; 9	IRP; 7	GLN; 2	RCH; 33	DAR; 2	BRI; 5	NHA; 12	ROV; 11	TAL; 34	MAR; 31	PHO; 33	10th	2176
2026	Daniel Hemric	19	Chevy	DAY; 26	ATL; 34	STP; 8	DAR; 9	ROC; 24	BRI; 12	TEX; 7	GLN; 4	DOV; 30	CLT; 11	NSH; 15	MCH; 13	COR; 2	LRP; 6	NWS; 20	IRP; 34	RCH; 10	NHA; 8	BRI; 12	KAN; 4	CLT; 6	PHO; 7	TAL; 35	MAR; 15	HOM; 3	11th	659

=== Truck No. 20 history ===
On May 4, 2026, the team announced that they would field the No. 20 as a fifth team for developmental drivers beginning at Watkins Glen International for Toni Breidinger and later with Mason Massey. On May 26, it was announced that Daniel Dye would drive the No. 20 for four races. On June 9, it was announced that Brendan Gaughan would return to racing in the Truck Series, driving the No. 20 at San Diego. The race would be his first NASCAR start since 2020.

==== Truck No. 20 results ====
Year	Driver	No.	Make	1	2	3	4	5	6	7	8	9	10	11	12	13	14	15	16	17	18	19	20	21	22	23	24	25	Owners	Pts
2026	Toni Breidinger	20	Chevy	DAY	ATL	STP	DAR	ROC	BRI	TEX	GLN; DNQ	DOV	CLT												PHO; 32	TAL	MAR		36th	150
2026	Daniel Dye	20	Chevy											NSH; 10	MCH; 15								KAN; 15	CLT; 28					36th	150
2026	Brendan Gaughan	20	Chevy													COR; 16	LRP	NWS	IRP										36th	150
2026	Mason Massey	20	Chevy																	RCH; 25	NHA; DNQ	BRI						HOM; 12	36th	150

=== Truck No. 35 history ===
The No. 35 attempted to make their debut at the 2022 Blue-Emu Maximum Pain Relief 200 at Martinsville Speedway, but failed to qualify with Jake Garcia due to a rained out qualifying. The team signed Garcia for a full-time effort in the No. 35 in 2023. Chase Elliott ran the first race in 2023 at Daytona International Speedway due to Garcia not being 18. The team went on to finish in the top-ten several times during the season, but failed to make the playoffs.

==== Truck No. 35 results ====
Year	Driver	No.	Make	1	2	3	4	5	6	7	8	9	10	11	12	13	14	15	16	17	18	19	20	21	22	23	Owners	Pts
2022	Jake Garcia	35	Chevy	DAY	LVS	ATL	COA	MAR; DNQ	BRI	DAR	KAN	TEX	CLT	GTW; 29	SON	KNO	NSH	MOH	POC	IRP; 28	RCH; 20	KAN	BRI; 22	TAL	HOM	PHO; 16	42nd	70
2023	Chase Elliott	35	Chevy	DAY; 10																							14th	561
2023	Jake Garcia	35	Chevy		LVS; 10	ATL; 18	COA; 19	TEX; 5	BRD; 6	MAR; 13	KAN; 8	DAR; 26	NWS; 23	CLT; 15	GTW; 10	NSH; 10	MOH; 16	POC; 35	RCH; 4	IRP; 13	MLW; 9	KAN; 11	BRI; 11	TAL; 29	HOM; 15	PHO; 2	14th	561

=== Truck No. 43 history ===
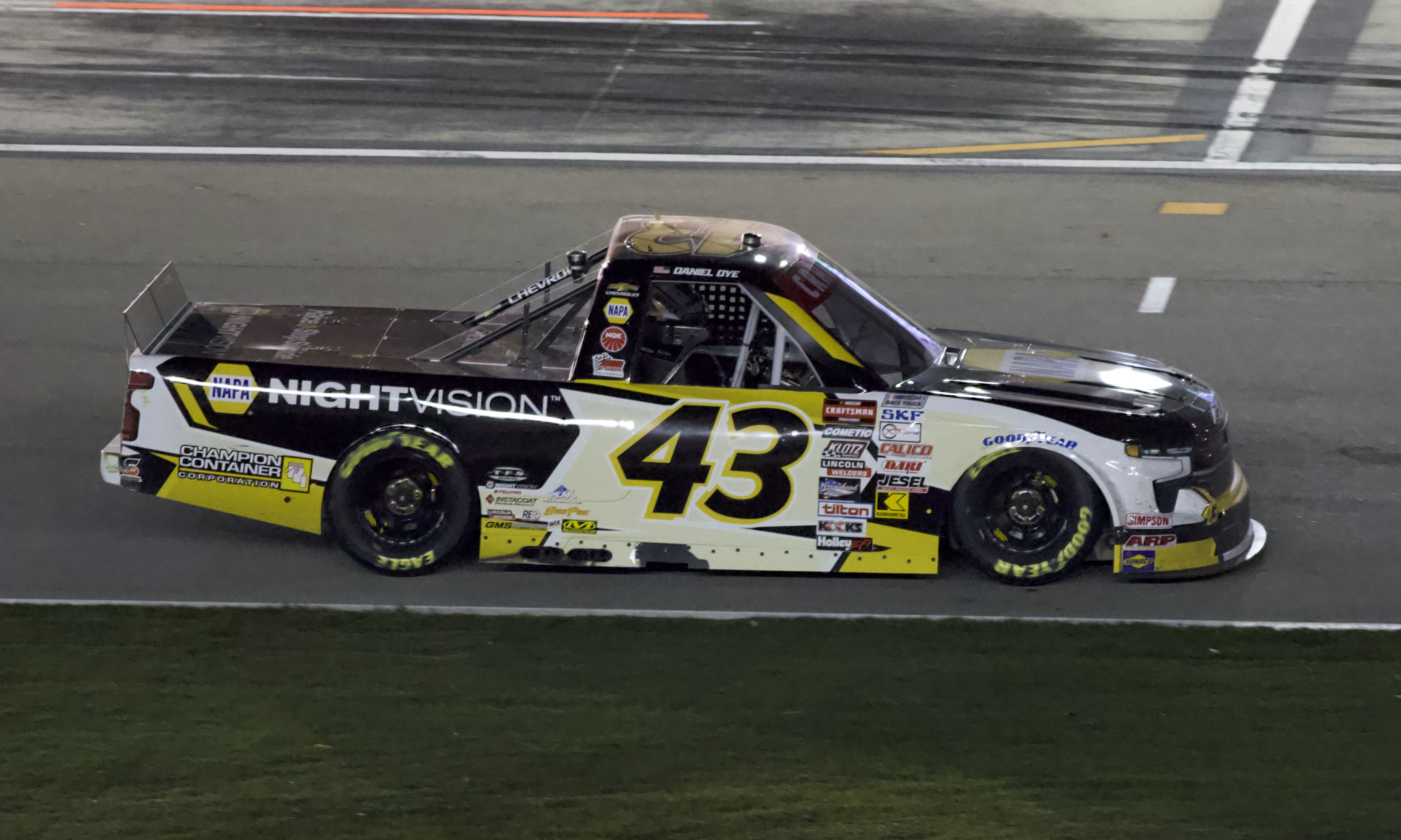
Dye's No. 43 truck at Las Vegas Motor Speedway in 2024.

On September 27, 2023, McAnally–Hilgemann Racing signed Daniel Dye for 2024. Dye will use the No. 43 from his previous team, GMS Racing. Dye was able to qualify for the Truck Series Playoffs, but he would be eliminated after the first round, ultimately finishing tenth in points at season’s end.

==== Truck No. 43 results ====
Year	Driver	No.	Make	1	2	3	4	5	6	7	8	9	10	11	12	13	14	15	16	17	18	19	20	21	22	23	Owners	Pts
2024	Daniel Dye	43	Chevy	DAY; 21	ATL; 9	LVS; 24	BRI; 13	COA; 28	MAR; 13	TEX; 6	KAN; 9	DAR; 23	NWS; 9	CLT; 19	GTW; 12	NSH; 2	POC; 16	IRP; 27	RCH; 8	MLW; 8	BRI; 32	KAN; 27	TAL; 3	HOM; 7	MAR; 32	PHO; 24	13th	559

=== Truck No. 62 history ===
McAnally debuted in the Craftsman Truck Series in 2000 with Brendan Gaughan as the driver of the No. 62 truck. He run six races that season and failed to qualify for one race.

In 2001, Gaughan returned for three races with the best finished of third at Mesa Marin Raceway.

==== Truck No. 62 results ====
Year	Driver	No.	Make	1	2	3	4	5	6	7	8	9	10	11	12	13	14	15	16	17	18	19	20	21	22	23	24	Owners	Pts
2000	Brendan Gaughan	62	Chevy	DAY	HOM	PHO; 13	MMR; 13	MAR	PIR	GTY; 11	MEM	PPR	EVG; 24	TEX	KEN	GLN	MLW	NHA	NZH	MCH	IRP	NSV	CIC; DNQ	RCH	DOV	TEX	CAL; 19		
2001	Brendan Gaughan	62	Chevy	DAY	HOM	MMR; 3	MAR	GTY	DAR	PPR	DOV	TEX	MEM	MLW	KAN	KEN	NHA	IRP	NSH	CIC	NZH	RCH	SBO	TEX	LVS; 11	PHO; 13	CAL		

=== Truck No. 81 history ===
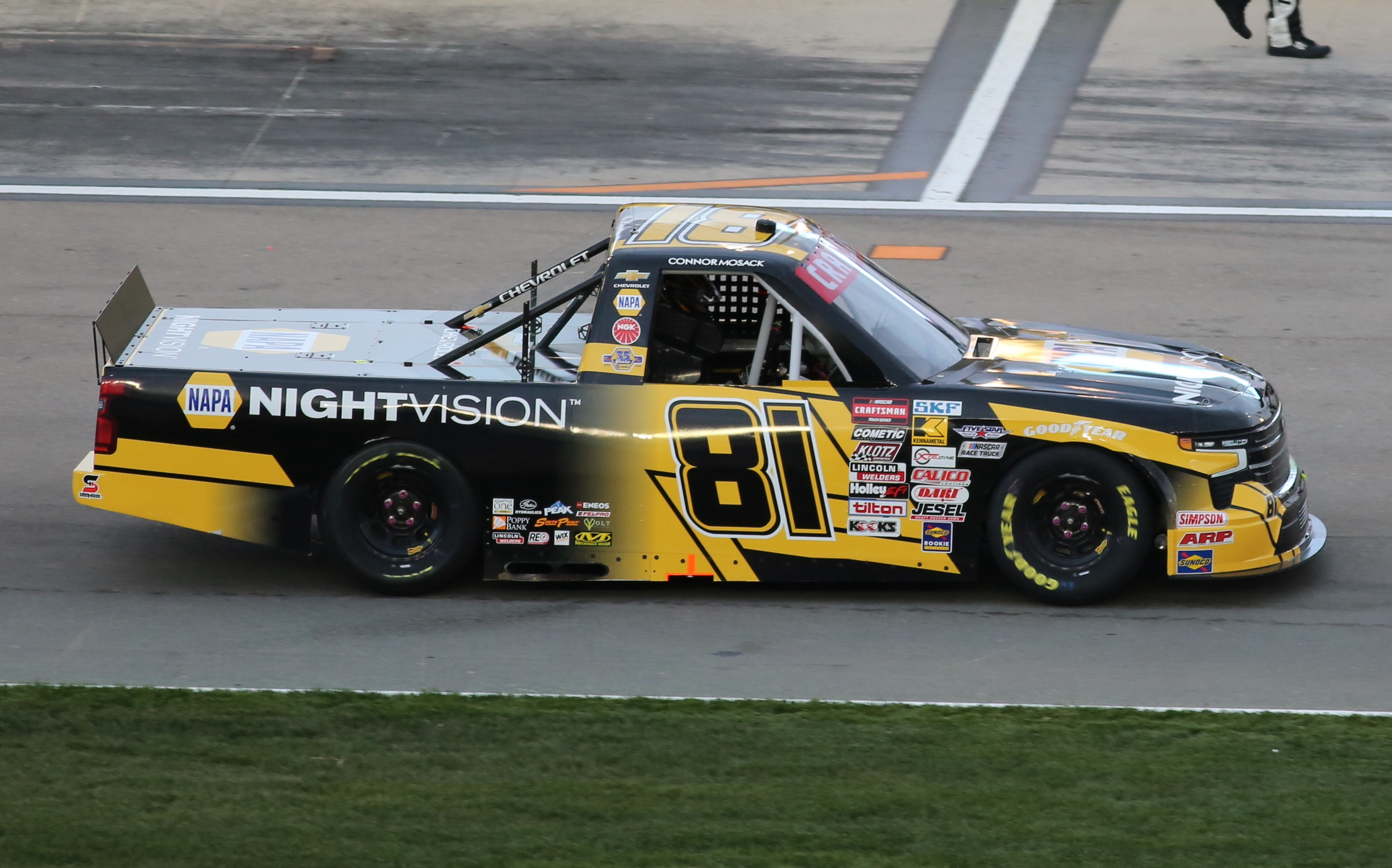
Mosack's No. 81 truck at Las Vegas Motor Speedway in 2025.

In 2024, McAnally fielded the No. 81 truck part-time for Corey Day at Bristol and Martinsville.

On December 3, 2024, McAnally announced that Connor Mosack would drive the No. 81 truck full-time in 2025.

On December 9, 2025, MHR announced that Kris Wright would replace Connor Mosack as the driver of the No. 81 Chevrolet for the 2026 season.

==== Truck No. 81 results ====
Year	Driver	No.	Make	1	2	3	4	5	6	7	8	9	10	11	12	13	14	15	16	17	18	19	20	21	22	23	24	25	Owners	Pts
2024	Corey Day	81	Chevy	DAY	ATL	LVS	BRI	COA	MAR	TEX	KAN	DAR	NWS	CLT	GTW	NSH	POC	IRP	RCH	MLW	BRI; 18	KAN	TAL	HOM	MAR; 18	PHO			39th	38
2025	Connor Mosack	81	Chevy	DAY; 32	ATL; 25	LVS; 20	HOM; 19	MAR; 25	BRI; 24	CAR; 9	TEX; 22	KAN; 18	NWS; 16	CLT; 23	NSH; 23	MCH; 19	POC; 6	LRP; 16	IRP; 17	GLN; 16	RCH; 18	DAR; 13	BRI; 7	NHA; 36	ROV; 10	TAL; 14	MAR; 30	PHO; 26	19th	515
2026	Kris Wright	81	Chevy	DAY; 25	ATL; 18	STP; 19	DAR; 33	ROC; 19	BRI; 25	TEX; 31	GLN; 29	DOV; 17	CLT; 31	NSH; 23	MCH; 31	COR; 13	LRP; 17	NWS; 30	IRP; 31	RCH; 31	NHA; 34	BRI; 27	KAN; 36	CLT; 25	PHO; 26	TAL; 32	MAR; 21	HOM; 24	29th	277

=== Truck No. 91 history ===
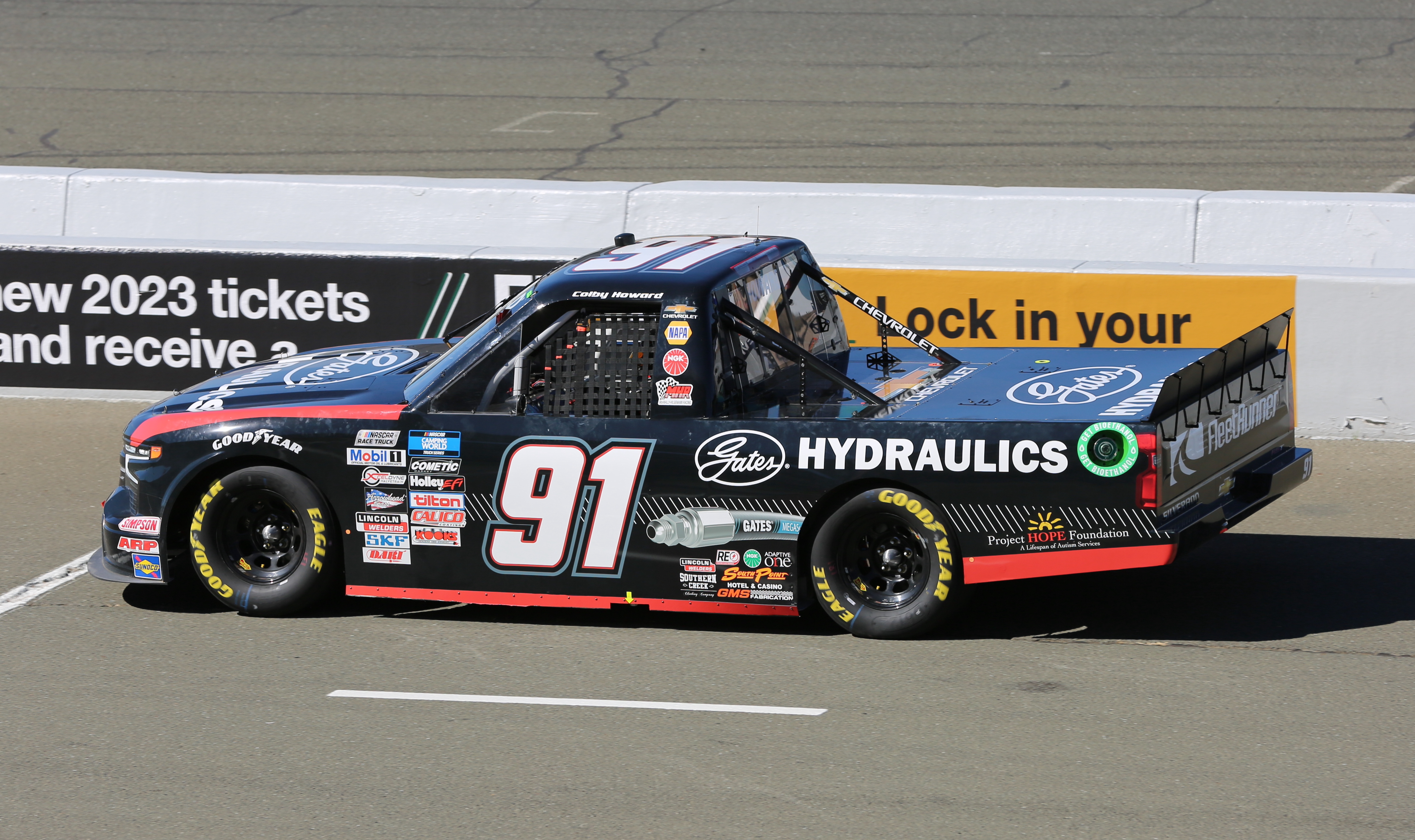
Howard's No. 91 truck at Sonoma Raceway in 2022

The team ran the No. 91 in 2022 full time with Colby Howard. Howard would not return for 2023 and the team was subsequently shut down.

On December 6, 2023, it was announced that Jack Wood would drive the No. 91 truck part-time for 2024, and full time in the ARCA Menards Series West in the No. 16 Chevy.

The No. 91 would end up running the full schedule in 2024 with other drivers driving the truck in the races Wood was not entered for. Zane Smith was initially scheduled to run in four races, but drove an additional race at Pocono. Vicente Salas raced at Gateway finishing 25th. Connor Hall made his Craftsman Truck Series debut at Richmond, finishing an impressive tenth in his first career start. Corey Day drove the remaining two races at Kansas and Homestead. Ryan Reed would race the truck at Talladega, finishing seventh.

On December 17, 2024, it was announced that Jack Wood would drive the No. 91 full-time in 2025.

On November 20, 2025, it was announced that Christian Eckes will return to the Craftsman Truck Series full-time for the 2026 season with McAnally’s team, this time driving the No. 91 Chevrolet.

==== Truck No. 91 results ====
Year	Driver	No.	Make	1	2	3	4	5	6	7	8	9	10	11	12	13	14	15	16	17	18	19	20	21	22	23	24	25	Owners	Pts
2022	Colby Howard	91	Chevy	DAY; 30	LVS; 34	ATL; 26	COA; 24	MAR; 18	BRI; 12	DAR; 13	KAN; 11	TEX; 34	CLT; 14	GTW; 23	SON; 19	KNX; 16	NSH; 16	MOH; 9	POC; 18	IRP; 32	RCH; 28	KAN; 9	BRI; 24	TAL; 8	HOM; 13	PHO; 15			18th	422
2024	Jack Wood	91	Chevy	DAY; 18	ATL; 31			COA; 13	MAR; 18			DAR; 25	NWS; 12	CLT; 21		NSH; 16		IRP; 15		MLW; 15	BRI; 26				MAR; 26	PHO; 35			17th	515
2024	Zane Smith	91	Chevy			LVS; 8	BRI; 3			TEX; 5	KAN; 2						POC; 20												17th	515
2024	Vicente Salas	91	Chevy												GTW; 25														17th	515
2024	Connor Hall	91	Chevy																RCH; 10										17th	515
2024	Corey Day	91	Chevy																			KAN; 32		HOM; 16					17th	515
2024	Ryan Reed	91	Chevy																				TAL; 7						17th	515
2025	Jack Wood	91	Chevy	DAY; 24	ATL; 21	LVS; 30	HOM; 21	MAR; 19	BRI; 11	CAR; 7	TEX; 11	KAN; 24	NWS; 20	CLT; 25	NSH; 20	MCH; 20	POC; 14	LRP; 22	IRP; 20	GLN; 33	RCH; Wth	DAR; 14	BRI; 22	NHA; 22	ROV; 22	TAL; 21	MAR; 13	PHO; 10	23rd	443
2026	Christian Eckes	91	Chevy	DAY; 3	ATL; 36	STP; 15	DAR; 3	ROC; 13	BRI; 5*	TEX; 8	GLN; 16	DOV; 7	CLT; 6	NSH; 8	MCH; 32	COR; 9	LRP; 5	NWS; 4	IRP; 33	RCH; 3	NHA; 28	BRI; 30	KAN; 2	CLT; 2	PHO; 2	TAL; 21	MAR; 10	HOM; 2*	5th	2298

== ARCA Menards Series ==
=== Car No. 12 history ===
In 2020, the team fielded the No. 12 car for Lawless Alan at Phoenix. He finished ninth.

==== Car No. 12 results ====
Year	Driver	No.	Make	1	2	3	4	5	6	7	8	9	10	11	12	13	14	15	16	17	18	19	20	AMSC	Pts
2020	Lawless Alan	12	Toyota	DAY	PHO; 9	TAL	POC	IRP	KEN	IOW	KAN	TOL	TOL	MCH	DRC	GTW	L44	TOL	BRI	WIN	MEM	ISF	KAN	59th	35

=== Car No. 16 history ===
In 2020, Gio Scelzi was confirmed for a full ARCA West schedule for the team, along with three ARCA Menards Series races at Phoenix, Iowa, and Gateway driving the organization's No. 16 car.

In 2021, Jesse Love returned to BMR for his second season in the West Series, along with one ARCA starts the No. 16 car at Phoenix. He finished sixth.

In 2022, Austin Herzog signed with BMR to run the full 2022 ARCA Menards Series West schedule. He also piloted the 16 car at one ARCA Menards Series race at Phoenix, where he finished 14th.

In 2023, BMR announced that Tanner Reif would run full-time in the ARCA West series. He also piloted the 16 car at one ARCA Menards Series race at Phoenix. He finished 12th.

In 2024, Jack Wood piloted the No. 16 car at Phoenix. He finished seventh.

In 2026, Hailie Deegan drove the No. 16 car at Phoenix, finishing 11th.

==== Car No. 16 results ====
Year	Driver	No.	Make	1	2	3	4	5	6	7	8	9	10	11	12	13	14	15	16	17	18	19	20	AMSC	Pts
2020	Gio Scelzi	16	Toyota	DAY	PHO; 10	TAL	POC	IRP	KEN	IOW; 11	KAN	TOL	TOL	MCH	DAY	GTW; 13	L44	TOL	BRI	WIN	MEM	ISF	KAN	33rd	98
2021	Jesse Love	16	Toyota	DAY	PHO; 6	TAL	KAN	TOL	CLT	MOH	POC	ELK	BLN	IOW	WIN	GLN	MCH	ISF	MLW	DSF	BRI	SLM	KAN	10th	368
2022	Austin Herzog	16	Chevy	DAY	PHO; 14	TAL	KAN	CLT	IOW	BLN	ELK	MOH	POC	IRP	MCH	GLN	ISF	MLW	DSF	KAN	BRI	SLM	TOL	91st	30
2023	Tanner Reif	16	Chevy	DAY	PHO; 12	TAL	KAN	CLT	BLN	ELK	MOH	IOW	POC	MCH	IRP	GLN	ISF	MLW	DSF	KAN	BRI	SLM	TOL	87th	32
2024	Jack Wood	16	Chevy	DAY	PHO; 7	TAL	DOV	KAN	CLT	IOW	MOH	BLN	IRP	SLM	ELK	MCH	ISF	MLW	DSF	GLN	BRI	KAN	TOL	80th	37
2026	Hailie Deegan	16	Chevy	DAY	PHO; 11	KAN	TAL	GLN	TOL	MCH	POC	BER	ELK	CHI	LRP	IRP	IOW	ISF	MAD	DSF	SLM	BRI	KAN	61st	33

=== Car No. 19 history ===
In 2020, Jesse Love was confirmed for a full ARCA West schedule for the team, along with three ARCA Menards Series races at Phoenix, Iowa, and Gateway driving the No. 19 car.

In 2021, Derek Kraus drove the No. 19 car at Phoenix. He finished fifth.

In 2022, Kraus returned at the same race. This time he finished ninth.

In 2024, it was announced that Eric Johnson Jr. would run full-time in the West Series. He also made one ARCA start in the No. 19 car at Phoenix. He finished 20th.

==== Car No. 19 results ====
Year	Driver	No.	Make	1	2	3	4	5	6	7	8	9	10	11	12	13	14	15	16	17	18	19	20	AMSC	Pts
2020	Jesse Love	19	Toyota	DAY	PHO; 16	TAL	POC	IRP	KEN	IOW; 12	KAN	TOL	TOL	MCH	DRC	GTW; 5	L44	TOL	BRI	WIN	MEM	ISF	KAN	26th	139
2021	Derek Kraus	19	Toyota	DAY	PHO; 5	TAL	KAN	TOL	CLT	MOH	POC	ELK	BLN	IOW	WIN	GLN	MCH	ISF	MLW	DSF	BRI	SLM	KAN	75th	39
2022	Derek Kraus	19	Chevy	DAY	PHO; 9	TAL	KAN	CLT	IOW	BLN	ELK	MOH	POC	IRP	MCH	GLN	ISF	MLW	DSF	KAN	BRI	SLM	TOL	83rd	35
2024	Eric Johnson Jr.	19	Chevy	DAY	PHO; 20	TAL	DOV	KAN	CLT	IOW	MOH	BLN	IRP	SLM	ELK	MCH	ISF	MLW	DSF	GLN	BRI	KAN	TOL	99th	24
2025	Jake Bollman	19	Chevy	DAY	PHO; 24	TAL	KAN	CLT	MCH	BLN	ELK	LRP	DOV	IRP	IOW	GLN	ISF	MAD	DSF	BRI	SLM	KAN	TOL	67th	20

=== Car No. 21 history ===
In 2022, the team fielded the No. 21 car in partnership with GMS Racing for Jack Wood at Mid-Ohio. He finished 25th.

==== Car No. 21 results ====
Year	Driver	No.	Make	1	2	3	4	5	6	7	8	9	10	11	12	13	14	15	16	17	18	19	20	AMSC	Pts
2022	Jack Wood	21	Toyota	DAY	PHO	TAL	KAN	CLT	IOW	BLN	ELK	MOH; 25	POC	IRP	MCH	GLN	ISF	MLW	DSF	KAN	BRI	SLM	TOL		

=== Car No. 81 history ===
In 2026, the team fielded the No. 81 car for Mason Massey at Phoenix.

==== Car No. 81 results ====
Year	Driver	No.	Make	1	2	3	4	5	6	7	8	9	10	11	12	13	14	15	16	17	18	19	20	AMSC	Pts
2026	Mason Massey	81	Chevy	DAY	PHO; 5	KAN	TAL	GLN	TOL	MCH	POC	BER	ELK	CHI	LRP	IRP	IOW	ISF	MAD	DSF	SLM	BRI	KAN	59th	39

=== Car No. 91 history ===
In 2022, the team fielded the No. 91 car for Colby Howard at Mid-Ohio. He finished 17th.

==== Car No. 91 results ====
Year	Driver	No.	Make	1	2	3	4	5	6	7	8	9	10	11	12	13	14	15	16	17	18	19	20	AMSC	Pts
2022	Colby Howard	91	Toyota	DAY	PHO	TAL	KAN	CLT	IOW	BLN	ELK	MOH; 17	POC	IRP	MCH	GLN	ISF	MLW	DSF	KAN	BRI	SLM	TOL		

=== Car No. 99 history ===
In 2020, Gracie Trotter was announced as a driver for BMR in the ARCA Menards Series West, as well as for select ARCA Menards Series races in the No. 99 car.

In 2021, BMR announced that Cole Moore would run full-time in the ARCA West series. He also piloted the No. 99 car at one ARCA Menards Series race at Phoenix. He finished 12th.

In 2022, Moore returned at the same race. This time he finished 11th. Blaine Perkins also made one start in the 99 car at Mid-Ohio. He finished 18th.

==== Car No. 99 results ====
Year	Driver	No.	Make	1	2	3	4	5	6	7	8	9	10	11	12	13	14	15	16	17	18	19	20	AMSC	Pts
2020	Gracie Trotter	99	Toyota	DAY	PHO; 22	TAL	POC	IRP	KEN	IOW; 9	KAN	TOL	TOL	MCH	DAY	GTW; 12	L44	TOL	BRI	WIN	MEM	ISF	KAN	89th	37
2021	Cole Moore	99	Toyota	DAY	PHO; 12	TAL	KAN	TOL	CLT	MOH	POC	ELK	BLN	IOW	WIN	GLN	MCH	ISF	MLW	DSF	BRI	SLM	KAN	93rd	32
2022	Cole Moore	99	Chevy	DAY	PHO; 11	TAL	KAN	CLT	IOW	BLN	ELK														
2022	Blaine Perkins	99	Chevy									MOH; 18	POC	IRP	MCH	GLN	ISF	MLW	DSF	KAN	BRI	SLM	TOL		

== ARCA Menards Series East ==
=== Car No. 00 history ===
In 2014, the team fielded the No. 00 car part-time for Cole Custer. He scored a win at Richmond.

In 2015, Custer returned for one race at Watkins Glen. He won the pole and finished fifth.

==== Car No. 00 results ====
Year	Driver	No.	Make	1	2	3	4	5	6	7	8	9	10	11	12	13	14	15	16	NKNPSEC	Pts
2014	Cole Custer	00	Chevy	NSM	DAY	BRI; 14	GRE	RCH; 1*	IOW; 11	BGS	FIF	LGY	NHA	COL	IOW; 3	GLN; 16	VIR; 18	GRE	DOV; 18		
2015	Cole Custer	00	Toyota	NSM	GRE	BRI	IOW	BGS	LGY	COL	NHA	IOW	GLN; 5	MOT	VIR	RCH	DOV				

=== Car No. 12 history ===
In 2019, the team fielded the No. 12 car for Lawless Alan at New Hampshire. He finished tenth.

==== Car No. 12 results ====
Year	Driver	No.	Make	1	2	3	4	5	6	7	8	9	10	11	12	NKNPSEC	Pts
2019	Lawless Alan	12	Toyota	NSM	BRI	SBO	SBO	MEM	NHA; 10	IOW	GLN	BRI	GTW	NHA	DOV		

=== Car No. 15 history ===
In 2014, Haas Racing development driver Nick Drake drove the No. 15 car full-time. He scored one pole at Richmond.

In 2015, Drake returned to the No. 15 car full-time.

==== Car No. 15 results ====
Year	Driver	No.	Make	1	2	3	4	5	6	7	8	9	10	11	12	13	14	15	16	NKNPSEC	Pts
2014	Nick Drake	15	Toyota	NSM; 15	DAY; 4	BRI; 29	GRE; 16	RCH; 3	IOW; 2	BGS; 10	FIF; 14	LGY; 7	NHA; 24	COL; 7	IOW; 13	GLN; 10	VIR; 12	GRE; 5	DOV; 28		
2015	Nick Drake	15	Toyota	NSM; 8	GRE; 7	BRI; 13	IOW; 11	BGS; 10	LGY; 8	COL; 11	NHA; 4	IOW; 16	GLN; 11	MOT; 14	VIR; 7	RCH; 28	DOV; 5				

=== Car No. 16 history ===
In 2013, the team fielded the No. 16 car for Sergio Peña at Five Flags Speedway. He finished eighth. Eric Holmes also made one start in the No. 16 car at Colombia Motor Speedway where he finished 22nd.

In 2014, Brandon McReynolds made two start in the No. 16 car at New Smyrna and Daytona.

In 2016, Todd Gilliland made 6 starts in the No. 16 car. After winning the pole at New Smyrna, he won the race in controversial fashion, as Ronnie Bassett Jr. was originally declared the winner since the flagman failed to wave the white flag in time after lap 150 and unintentionally extended the race by a lap. The race was subsequently declared official after 150 laps. Riley Herbst made one start in the No. 16 car at Dover where he finished eighth.

In 2017, Gilliland run full-time in the No. 16 car.

In 2018, Derek Kraus made six starts in the No. 16 car. He won a race at Gateway.

In 2019, Kraus returned for another part-time schedule in the No. 16 car. He won two races New Smyrna and South Boston.

In 2020, Gio Scelzi made one start in the No. 16 car at New Smyrna, where he finished 13th.

==== Car No. 16 results ====
Year	Driver	No.	Make	1	2	3	4	5	6	7	8	9	10	11	12	13	14	15	16	AMSEC	Pts
2013	Sergio Peña	16	Toyota	BRI	GRE	FIF; 8	RCH	BGS	IOW	LGY											
2013	Eric Holmes	16	Toyota								COL; 22	IOW	VIR	GRE	NHA	DOV	RAL				
2014	Brandon McReynolds	16	Toyota	NSM; 14	DAY; 3	BRI	GRE	RCH	IOW	BGS	FIF	LGY	NHA	COL	IOW	GLN	VIR	GRE	DOV		
2016	Todd Gilliland	16	Toyota	NSM; 1*	MOB	GRE	BRI; 9	VIR	DOM	STA; 5	COL; 7	NHA; 2	IOW	GLN	GRE	NJM					
2016	Riley Herbst	16	Toyota														DOV; 8				
2017	Todd Gilliland	16	Toyota	NSM; 9	GRE; 3	BRI; 8	SBO; 3	SBO; 2	MEM; 8	BLN; 1	THO; 2*	NHA; 1*	IOW; 1*	GLN; 2	LGY; 1	NJM; 2	DOV; 13				
2018	Derek Kraus	16	Toyota	NSM; 4	BRI; 24	LGY	SBO	SBO	MEM; 14	NJM	TMP	NHA; 5	IOW; 20	GLN	GTW; 1*	NHA	DOV				
2019	Derek Kraus	16	Toyota	NSM; 1	BRI; 6	SBO; 9	SBO; 1*	MEM; 5	NHA; 3	IOW; 4	GLN; 9	BRI	GTW; 2	NHA	DOV						
2020	Gio Scelzi	16	Toyota	NSM; 13	TOL	DOV	TOL	BRI	FIF												

=== Car No. 19 history ===
In 2016, the team fielded the No. 19 car for Riley Herbst at New Smyrna and Bristol.

In 2018, Hailie Deegan would make run part-time schedule in the No. 19 car.

In 2019, Deegan would return for part-time schedule in the No. 19 car. Todd Gilliland and Brandon Jones also made one start each in the No. 19 car.

In 2020, Jesse Love made one start in the No. 19 car at New Smyrna where he finished 12th.

==== Car No. 19 results ====
Year	Driver	No.	Make	1	2	3	4	5	6	7	8	9	10	11	12	13	14	AMSEC	Pts
2016	Riley Herbst	19	Toyota	NSM; 9	MOB	GRE	BRI; 10	VIR	DOM	STA	COL	NHA	IOW	GLN	GRE	NJM	DOV		
2018	Hailie Deegan	19	Toyota	NSM; 29	BRI; 22	LGY	SBO	SBO	MEM; 13	NJM	TMP	NHA; 16	IOW; 21	GLN	GTW; 23	NHA	DOV		
2019	Hailie Deegan	19	Toyota	NSM; 16	BRI; 16	SBO; 10	SBO; 12		NHA; 11	IOW; 12			GTW; 9	NHA	DOV				
2019	Todd Gilliland	19	Toyota					MEM; 8											
2019	Brandon Jones	19	Toyota								GLN; 14	BRI							
2020	Jesse Love	19	Toyota	NSM; 12	TOL	DOV	TOL	BRI											

=== Car No. 50 history ===
In 2019, the team fielded the No. 50 car for Raphaël Lessard at Bristol. He finished eighth.

In 2020, Holley Hollan made one start in the No. 50 car at New Smyrna where she finished 15th.

==== Car No. 50 results ====
Year	Driver	No.	Make	1	2	3	4	5	6	7	8	9	10	11	12	AMSEC	Pts
2019	Raphaël Lessard	50	Toyota	NSM	BRI; 9	SBO	SBO	MEM	NHA	IOW	GLN	BRI	GTW	NHA	DOV		
2020	Holley Hollan	50	Toyota	NSM; 15	TOL	DOV	TOL	BRI	FIF								

=== Car No. 54 history ===
In 2017, the team fielded the No. 54 car for Riley Herbst at Bristol. However, the team withdrew from the race.

==== Car No. 54 results ====
Year	Driver	No.	Make	1	2	3	4	5	6	7	8	9	10	11	12	13	14	NKNPSEC	Pts
2017	Riley Herbst	54	Toyota	NSM	GRE	BRI; Wth	SBO	SBO	MEM	BLN	TMP	NHA	IOW	GLN	LGY	NJM	DOV		

=== Car No. 99 history ===
In 2014, the team fielded the No. 99 car part-time for Patrick Staropoli. Ryan Reed also made one start in the No. 99 car at Watkins Glen where he finished seventh.

In 2015, Anthony Kumpen drove the No. 99 car at New Smyrna. He finished 14th. Eddie Cheever III made one start at Watkins Glen, however he failed to qualify. Staropoli made two starts in the No. 99 car at Richmond and Dover.

In 2017, Derek Kraus made one start in the No. 99 car at New Smyrna. He finished third.

In 2018, Cole Rouse made six starts in the No. 99 car.

In 2019, Brittney Zamora made six starts in the No. 99 car.

In 2020, Gracie Trotter made one start in the No. 99 car at New Smyrna, where she finished 16th.

==== Car No. 99 results ====
Year	Driver	No.	Make	1	2	3	4	5	6	7	8	9	10	11	12	13	14	15	16	AMSEC	Pts
2014	Patrick Staropoli	99	Toyota	NSM; 11	DAY; 8	BRI; 6	GRE	RCH	IOW	BGS	FIF	LGY	NHA	COL	IOW						
2014	Ryan Reed	99	Ford													GLN; 7	VIR	GRE	DOV		
2015	Anthony Kumpen	99	Toyota	NSM; 14	GRE	BRI	IOW	BGS	LGY	COL	IOW										
2015	Eddie Cheever III	99	Toyota										GLN; DNQ	MOT	VIR						
2015	Patrick Staropoli	99	Toyota													RCH; 35	DOV; 24				
2017	Derek Kraus	99	Toyota	NSM; 3	GRE	BRI	SBO	SBO	MEM	BLN	TMP	NHA	IOW	GLN	LGY	NJM	DOV				
2018	Cole Rouse	99	Toyota	NSM; 2	BRI; 21	LGY	SBO	SBO	MEM; 18	NJM	TMP	NHA; 10	IOW; 8	GLN	GTW; 2	NHA	DOV				
2019	Brittney Zamora	99	Toyota	NSM; 15	BRI; 11	SBO	SBO	MEM; 9	NHA; 12	IOW; 20	GLN	BRI	GTW; 16	NHA	DOV						
2020	Gracie Trotter	99	Toyota	NSM; 16	TOL	DOV	TOL	BRI	FIF												

== ARCA Menards Series West ==
=== Car No. 00 history ===
In 2014, BMR fielded the No. 00 car part-time for Cole Custer. He won the series opener at Phoenix, holding off Greg Pursley and Brennan Newberry on the green–white–checker finish.

In 2015, Custer returned for one race at Sonoma. He finished ninth. Eddie Cheever III drove the No. 00 car at All American Speedway. He finished 15th.

==== Car No. 00 results ====
Year	Driver	No.	Make	1	2	3	4	5	6	7	8	9	10	11	12	13	AMSWC	Pts
2014	Cole Custer	00	Chevy	PHO; 1*	IRW	S99	IOW	KCR								PHO; 3		
2014	Cole Custer	00	Toyota						SON; 12	SLS	CNS	IOW	EVG	KCR	MMP	AAS		
2015	Cole Custer	00	Toyota	KCR	IRW	TUS	IOW	SHA	SON; 9	SLS	IOW	EVG	CNS	MER				
2015	Eddie Cheever III	00	Toyota												AAS; 15	PHO		

=== Car No. 02 history ===
In 1996, the team fielded the No. 02 car for Bill McAnally part-time.

==== Car No. 02 results ====
Year	Driver	No.	Make	1	2	3	4	5	6	7	8	9	10	11	12	13	14	15	AMSWC	Pts
1996	Bill McAnally	02	Chevy	TUS	AMP	MMR	SON; DNQ	MAD	POR	TUS	EVG; 17	CNS	MAD	MMR	SON; 12	MMR; 9	PHO; DNQ	LVS; 22		

=== Car No. 04 history ===
In 2001, BMR fielded the No. 04 car for Hershel McGriff full-time.

In 2018, at the age of 90, McGriff announced plans to run the K&N West races at Tucson Speedway in the No. 04 car, and upon starting, became the oldest person to contest in a race sanctioned by NASCAR.

==== Car No. 04 results ====
Year	Driver	No.	Make	1	2	3	4	5	6	7	8	9	10	11	12	13	14	AMSWC	Pts
2001	Hershel McGriff	04	Chevy	PHO; 14	LVS; 18	TUS; 5	MMR; 16	CAL; 28	IRW; 13	LAG; 9	KAN; 14	EVG; 6	CNS; 9	IRW; 17	RMR; 8	LVS; 21	IRW; 12		
2018	Hershel McGriff	04	Toyota	KCR	TUS; 18	TUS; Wth	OSS	CNS	SON	DCS	IOW	EVG	GTW	LVS	MER	AAS	KCR		

=== Car No. 1 history ===
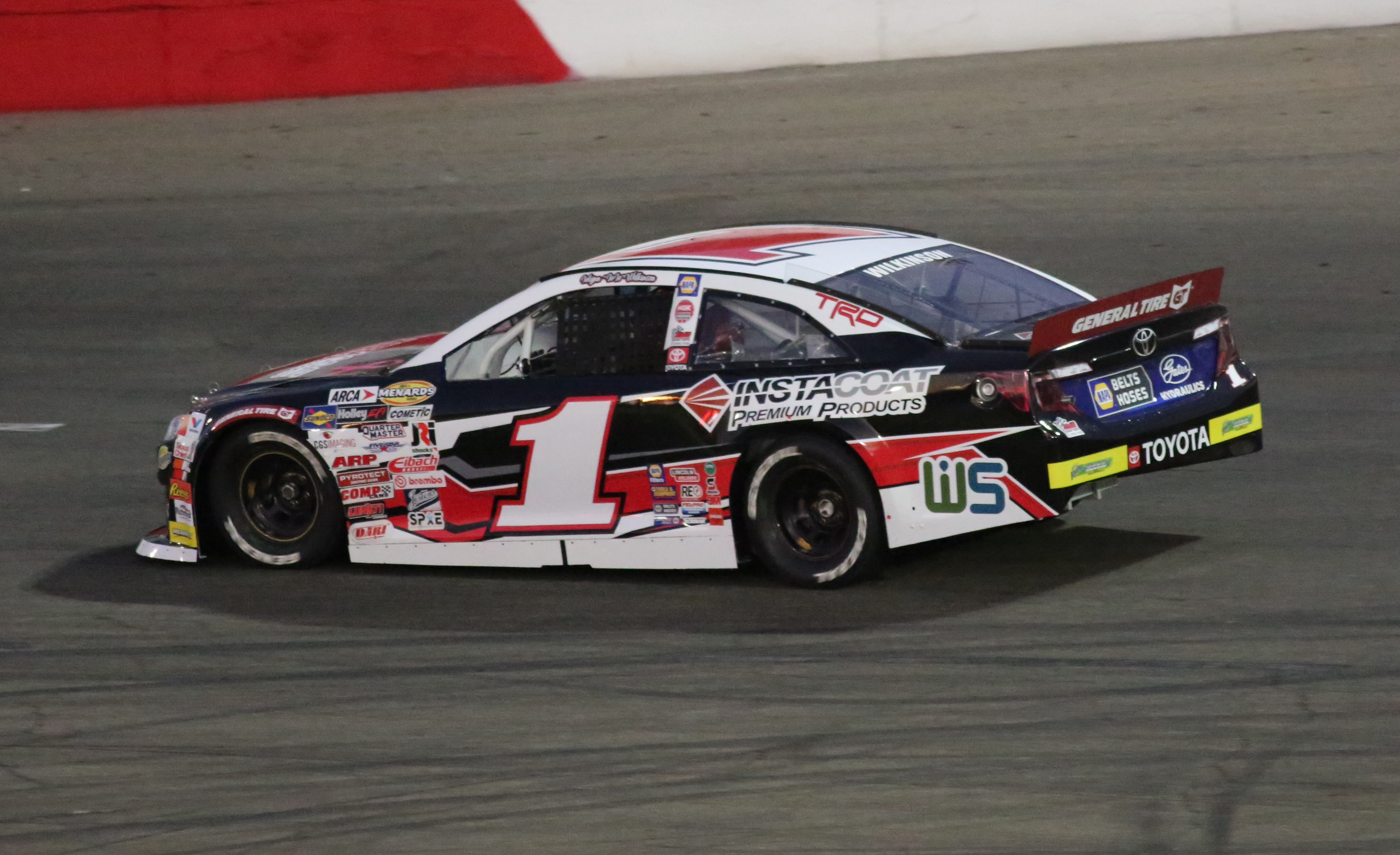
Jolynn Wilkinson in the No. 1 car at the All American Speedway in 2021.

In 2014, BMR fielded the No. 1 car for Michael Waltrip at All American Speedway. He finished 9th.

In 2021, the No. 1 car made a return at Las Vegas Motor Speedway Bullring and All American Speedway with Jolynn Wilkinson as the driver. She finished 17th and 15th respectively.

==== Car No. 1 results ====
Year	Driver	No.	Make	1	2	3	4	5	6	7	8	9	10	11	12	13	14	AMSWC	Pts
2014	Michael Waltrip	1	Toyota	PHO	IRW	S99	IOW	KCR	SON	SLS	CNS	IOW	EVG	KCR	MMP	AAS; 9	PHO		
2021	Jolynn Wilkinson	1	Toyota	PHO	SON	IRW	CNS	IRW	PIR	LVS; 17	AAS; 15	PHO							

=== Car No. 2 history ===
In 1995, Bill McAnally run a full regular-season schedule for the first time in the No. 2 car. He finished ninth in the championship standings.

In 1996, he returned for another full-time season. This time he split his driving duty between the No. 2 car and the No. 02 car.

==== Car No. 2 results ====
Year	Driver	No.	Make	1	2	3	4	5	6	7	8	9	10	11	12	13	14	15	AMSWC	Pts
1995	Bill McAnally	2	Chevy	TUS; 19	MMR; 25	SON	CNS; 13	MMR; 12	POR; 21	SGS; 5	TUS; 10	AMP; 9	MAD; 13	POR; 12	LVS; 6	SON; 19	MMR; 9	PHO	9th	1622
1996	Bill McAnally	2	Chevy	TUS; 15	AMP; 16	MMR; 17	SON	MAD; 11	POR; 17	TUS; 10	EVG	CNS; 12	MAD; 15	MMR; 17	SON	MMR	PHO	LVS		

=== Car No. 4 history ===
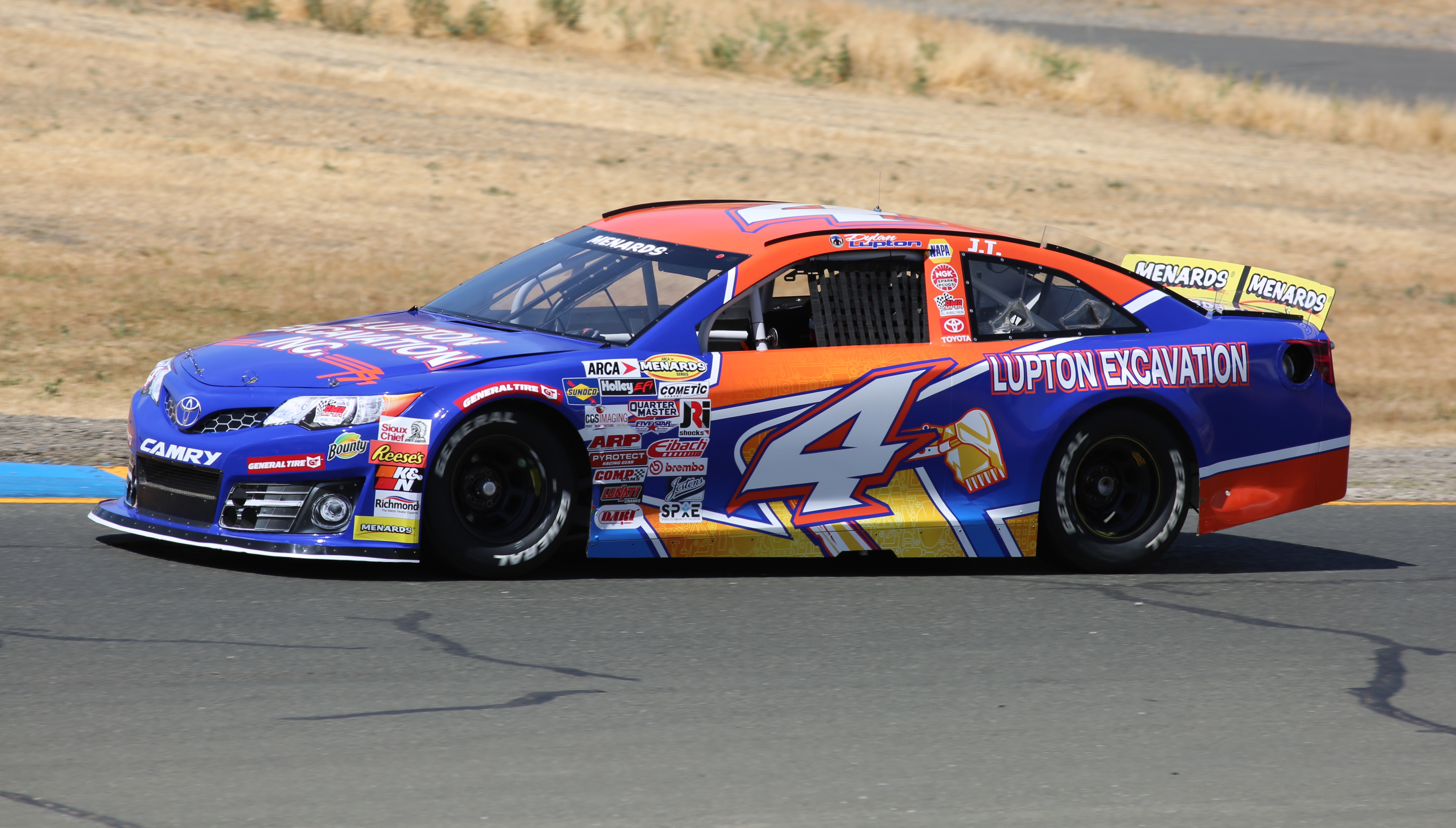
Dylan Lupton in the No. 4 car at Sonoma Raceway in 2021.

In 1994, the team fielded the No. 4 car for Bill McAnally at Mesa Marin Speedway. He finished 18th.

In 2021, the No. 4 car made a return at Sonoma Raceway with Dylan Lupton as the driver.

==== Car No. 4 results ====
Year	Driver	No.	Make	1	2	3	4	5	6	7	8	9	10	11	12	13	14	AMSWC	Pts
1994	Bill McAnally	4	Pontiac	MMR; 18	TUS	SON	SGS	YAK	MMR	POR	IND	CAJ	TCR	LVS	MMR	PHO	TUS		
2021	Dylan Lupton	4	Toyota	PHO	SON; 2	IRW	CNS	IRW	PIR	LVS	AAS	PHO							

=== Car No. 7 history ===
In 2014, BMR fielded the No. 7 car for Gracin Raz at All American Speedway. He finished seventh.

==== Car No. 7 results ====
Year	Driver	No.	Make	1	2	3	4	5	6	7	8	9	10	11	12	13	14	AMSWC	Pts
2014	Gracin Raz	7	Toyota	PHO	IRW	S99	IOW	KCR	SON	SLS	CNS	IOW	EVG	KCR	MMP	AAS; 7	PHO		

=== Car No. 9 history ===
In 1994, the team fielded the No. 9 car for Bill McAnally at Tucson Raceway Park. He finished 12th.

==== Car No. 9 results ====
Year	Driver	No.	Make	1	2	3	4	5	6	7	8	9	10	11	12	13	14	AMSWC	Pts
1994	Bill McAnally	9	Pontiac	MMR	TUS; 12	SON	SGS	YAK	MMR	POR	IND	CAJ	TCR	LVS	MMR	PHO	TUS		

=== Car No. 12 history ===
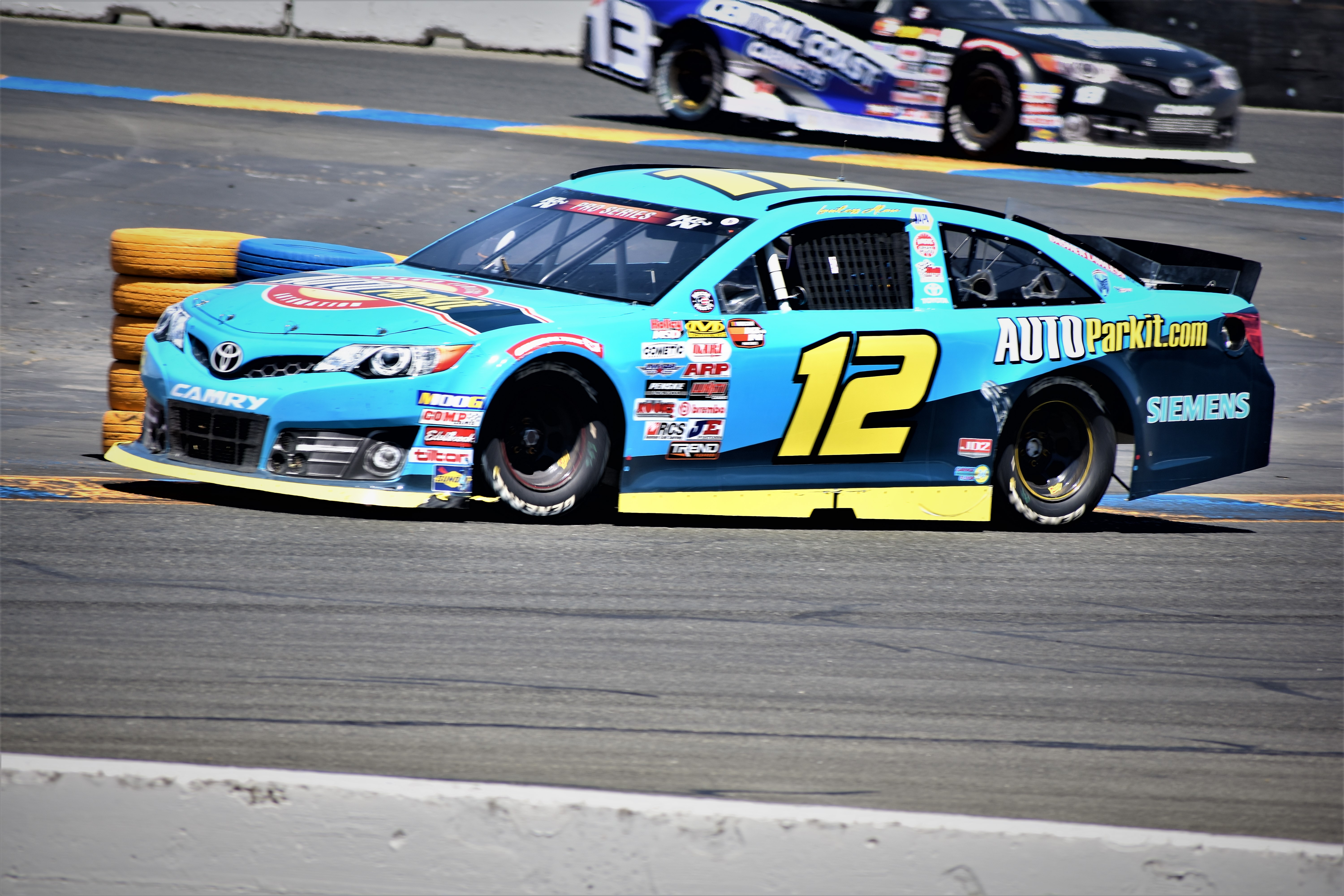
Lawless Alan in the No. 12 car at Sonoma Raceway in 2019.

In 1992, Bill McAnally made his debut in the west series. He fielded the No. 12 car for himself at Shasta Speedway and Mesa Marin Raceway. He finished 15th and 19th respectively.

McAnally returned for another part-time seasons in 1993 and 1994. However, he moved to the No. 2 car in 1995.

The No. 12 car made a return in 2003 with a slew of drivers such as Bryan Herta, Eric Holmes, Brandon Riehl, Dan Obrist, Nick DeFazio, John Moore, and Lynn Hardy.

At the end of 2008 season, McAnally fielded the No. 12 car for Paulie Harraka in the final two races of the season as preparation for a full run in 2009. In the last race of the season, second race for the team, he qualified on the pole and led 40 laps.

Over the next two seasons, Harraka competed full-time in the No. 12 car, first under the NAPA Autocare banner, then with NAPA Filters sponsorship, with crew chief Duane Knorr. The team has won three races and has 15 top-five finishes in 30 total races. They finished fourth and third in the series championship in 2009 and 2010, respectively, with Harraka winning Rookie of the Year in 2009 and Move of the Race in 2010.

Harraka took 2011 off from racing to further his studies, but did run the K&N Pro Series West race at Infineon Raceway in the No. 12 car. Other drivers such as D. J. Kennington, Gareth Nixon, Tomy Drissi and Michael Waltrip also made start in the No. 12 car.

In 2019, BMR fielded the No. 12 car for Lawless Alan at Sonoma.

In 2020 ARCA Menards Series West, Alan returned to the No. 12 car full-time. After the first four races of the season, Alan and his No. 12 car stopped attempting races for unknown reasons. The No. 12 car did not run any more raves for the remainder of the season until it was run by British driver Alex Sedgwick at Phoenix.

==== Car No. 12 results ====
Year	Driver	No.	Make	1	2	3	4	5	6	7	8	9	10	11	12	13	14	AMSWC	Pts
1992	Bill McAnally	12	Pontiac	MMR	SGS	SON	SHA; 15	POR	EVG	SSS	CAJ	TWS	MMR; 19	PHO					
1993	Bill McAnally	12	Pontiac	TWS	MMR; 16	SGS	SON	TUS	SHA; 13	EVG	POR	CBS; 7	SSS	CAJ; 4	TCR	MMR; 22	PHO		
1994	Bill McAnally	12	Chevy	MMR	TUS	SON	SGS	YAK	MMR	POR	IND	CAJ; 17	TCR	LVS; 12	MMR; 4	PHO	TUS; 16		
2003	Bryan Herta	12	Chevy	PHO	LVS	CAL; 5													
2003	Eric Holmes	12	Chevy				MAD; 5												
2003	Brandon Riehl	12	Chevy					TCR; 6											
2003	Dan Obrist	12	Chevy						EVG; 11				DCS; 9	PHO					
2003	Nick DeFazio	12	Chevy							IRW; 15					MMR; 14				
2003	John Moore	12	Chevy								S99; 11								
2003	Lynn Hardy	12	Chevy									RMR; 13							
2008	Paulie Harraka	12	Toyota	AAS	PHO	CTS	IOW	CNS	SON	IRW	DCS	EVG	MMP	IRW	AMP; 8	AAS; 6			
2009	Paulie Harraka	12	Toyota	CTS; 17	AAS; 3	PHO; 8	MAD; 4	IOW; 2	DCS; 13	SON; 14	IRW; 3	PIR; 16	MMP; 2	CNS; 1	IOW; 12	AAS; 1*		4th	1951
2010	Paulie Harraka	12	Toyota	AAS; 1*	PHO; 29	IOW; 18	DCS; 5	SON; 2	IRW; 13	PIR; 3	MRP; 11	CNS; 2	MMP; 3	AAS; 4	PHO; 25			3rd	1707
2011	D. J. Kennington	12	Toyota	PHO; 10	AAS														
2011	Gareth Nixon	12	Toyota			MMP; 18	IOW	LVS											
2011	Paulie Harraka	12	Toyota						SON; 12	IRW	EVG								
2011	Tomy Drissi	12	Toyota									PIR; 22	CNS						
2011	Michael Waltrip	12	Toyota											MRP; 7	SPO	AAS			
2019	Lawless Alan	12	Toyota	LVS	IRW	TUS	TUS	CNS	SON; 24	DCS	IOW	EVG	GTW	MER					
2019	Derrick Doering	12	Toyota												AAS; 9	KCR	PHO		
2020	Lawless Alan	12	Toyota	LVS; 6	MMP; 12	MMP; 12	IRW; 9	EVG	DCS	CNS	LVS	AAS	KCR						
2020	Alex Sedgwick	12	Toyota											PHO; 13					

=== Car No. 14 history ===
In 2008, BMR fielded the No. 14 car for Austin Cameron at Iowa. He finished third.

==== Car No. 14 results ====
Year	Driver	No.	Make	1	2	3	4	5	6	7	8	9	10	11	12	13	AMSWC	Pts
2008	Austin Cameron	14	Toyota	AAS	PHO	CTS	IOW; 3	CNS	SON	IRW	DCS	EVG	MMP	IRW	AMP	AAS		

=== Car No. 16 history ===
Bill McAnally first fielded his flagship No. 16 car in 1997 with himself as the driver.

In 1998, Mcanally only run the first four races before getting replaced by Gary Smith for the rest of the season. Smith won the team's first race at Portland Speedway.

In 1999, McAnally was getting ready to retire from racing when a chance meeting took place with a father and son who wanted to go racing. That meeting resulted in Sean Woodside racing in the No. 16 Chevrolet. He won the first race of the season at Tucson and went on to win the series championship.

McAnally next opened a seat for Brendan Gaughan who went on to win back-to-back titles for BMR in 2000 and 2001.

Austin Cameron drove the No. 16 Chevrolet from 2002 until 2004.

In 2005, Steve Portenga drove the No. 16 Chevrolet full-time. He scored three wins.

In 2006, Peyton Sellers drove the No. 16 Chevrolet full-time. He scored one win.

In 2007, Brian Ickler drove the No. 16 Chevrolet full-time. He scored three wins.

In 2008, the team switched manufacturer for Chevrolet to Toyota and moved Moses Smith from the team's No. 18 car to the No. 16 car. He drove this car until 2011.

The No. 16 did not make any starts in 2012. However, it made a return in 2013 with Sergio Peña, Eric Holmes and Shane Golobic as the drivers.

Brandon McReynolds drove the No. 16 Toyota from 2014 until 2015.

On February 4, 2016, McAnally announced that Todd Gilliland would compete for full-time driving the No. 16 Toyota Camry. Gilliland clinched the Pro Series West championship.

Gilliland returned for 2017 season and won another championship.

In 2018, Derek Kraus was moved from the team's No. 19 car to the flagship No. 16 car. He won the season-opening race at Kern County after making contact with race leader Kevin Harvick on the final restart, giving the lead to teammate Cole Rouse in the process. Kraus later passed the fellow BMR driver while both were running in lapped traffic, taking the win. Kraus then won the pole in both races at the series' doubleheader at Tucson Speedway, finishing fourth and eleventh in the first and second races respectively. At Douglas County Speedway, Kraus won his third career race, leading teammate Hailie Deegan to a 1-2 finish for BMR. At Evergreen Speedway, Kraus won the pole and led a majority of the race but ran out of fuel in the closing stages of the race, losing to Derek Thorn. In the series' next race, a combination race with the NASCAR K&N Pro Series East at Gateway Motorsports Park, Kraus passed Rouse on the final restart to secure his third victory of the season. At the Las Vegas Motor Speedway Dirt Track, he led 31 laps but spun in the later stages and retired from the race, dropping to 17th in the classification order. At Meridian Speedway, Kraus led the first 189 laps before slowing to avoid a spinning lapped car in a late caution, leading to a third-place finish. For the final West race of the season, the tour returned to Kern County Raceway, and Kraus won after a late-race restart. He finished the season-long points tally in fourth, behind Thorn, Ryan Partridge and Rouse.

In 2019, Kraus returned to the West Series in the No. 16 car. He began the season at the Dirt Track at Las Vegas with a sixth-place finish. He qualified second and was leading the field until getting shuffled back with around 30 laps remaining. He later won both races at Tucson Speedway's doubleheader event, leading all 100 laps in the first race. At Colorado, Kraus ran up front until a broken sway bar hindered his car's performance, dropping him down to the back of the top-five. After returning to the lead, Deegan collided with him on the final lap, resulting in Kraus finishing eighth after having spun out. At Douglas County Speedway, Kraus won the pole and led every lap en route to the win. His next win of the season was at Meridian Speedway, where he led 100 laps after racing Jagger Jones for the victory throughout the event and colliding with him late in the race, spinning Jones out. Kraus won again by leading every lap from the pole at Kern County, his fourth straight victory at the track. Kraus' position in points enabled him to clinch the K&N West championship simply by starting the final race at ISM Raceway, where he finished third and was crowned champion of the series.

In 2020, Gio Scelzi was tabbed for a full ARCA Menards Series West schedule driving the No. 16 Toyota. Scelzi scored a career-best ARCA West finish of second at the Las Vegas Motor Speedway Bullring in September. In the following race, Scelzi executed a bump-and-run maneuver on Taylor Gray during the penultimate lap to claim his first ARCA win. He would finish the season fifth in points.

In 2021, Jesse Love returned to BMR for his second season in the West Series, and moved from the No. 19 to the No. 16, replacing Scelzi.

In 2022, the team switched manufacture from Toyota back to Chevrolet. Austin Herzog was signed to run the full ARCA Menards Series West schedule. He would pilot the No. 16 car, replacing the 2021 West series champion Jesse Love. On June 30, 2022, it was announced that Landen Lewis would drive the No. 16 car for the remainder of the season, leaving Herzog without a ride.

On February 2, 2023, BMR announced that Tanner Reif will drive their No. 16 Chevrolet full-time in the 2023 season.

On December 6, 2023, it was announced Jack Wood would run full-time in the 2024 ARCA Menards Series West in the No. 16 Chevrolet.

On July 7, 2025, it was announced that Wood would drive the No. 16 at Sonoma.

On January 21, 2026, it was announced that Hailie Deegan would be returning full-time to the ARCA Menards Series West for the 2026 season driving the No. 16 Chevrolet. Deegan would break a nearly 7-year long winless streak by scoring her fourth career victory at Madera after contact on the final lap with points leader Trevor Huddleston. She would also won at rain-shortened season finale at Kern Raceway.

==== Car No. 16 results ====
Year	Driver	No.	Make	1	2	3	4	5	6	7	8	9	10	11	12	13	14	15	Owners	Pts
1997	Bill McAnally	16	Chevy	TUS; 7	AMP; 17	SON; DNQ	TUS; 11	MMR; 10	LVS; 14	CAL; 11	EVG; 12	POR; 6	PPR; 13	AMP; 7	SON; 6	MMR; 13	LVS; 38			
1998	Bill McAnally	16	Chevy	TUS; 11	LVS; 21	PHO; 9	CAL; 23													
1998	Gary Smith	16	Chevy					HPT; 7	MMR; 2	AMP; 2	POR; 1*	CAL; 13	PPR; 31	EVG; 2	SON; 30	MMR; 2	LVS; 17			
1999	Sean Woodside	16	Chevy	TUS; 1	LVS; 15	PHO; 7	CAL; 9	PPR; 3*	MMR; 15	IRW; 13	EVG; 2	POR; 6*	IRW; 10	RMR; 6	LVS; 17	MMR; 1	MOT; 5		1st	2075
2000	Brendan Gaughan	16	Chevy	PHO; 4	MMR; 1	LVS; 4*	CAL; 3	LAG; 9	IRW; 2	POR; 3	EVG; 1	IRW; 5*	RMR; 6	MMR; 15	IRW; 3				1st	1956
2001	Brendan Gaughan	16	Chevy	PHO; 25	LVS; 8	TUS; 12	MMR; 3*	CAL; 1	IRW; 1*	LAG; 4	KAN; 4	EVG; 1*	CNS; 2	IRW; 1*	RMR; 16*	LVS; 1	IRW; 1*		1st	2257
2002	Austin Cameron	16	Chevy	PHO; 1*	LVS; 1	CAL; 3	KAN; 17	EVG; 11*	IRW; 1*	S99; 12	RMR; 1	DCS; 1	LVS; 25						3rd	1542
2003	Austin Cameron	16	Chevy	PHO; 4	LVS; 17					IRW; 20	S99; 1*	RMR; 9	DCS; 1**	PHO; 7	MMR; 3					
2003	Eric Norris	16	Chevy			CAL; 7														
2003	C.T. Hellmund	16	Chevy				MAD; 11													
2003	Jeff Jefferson	16	Chevy					TCR; 5	EVG; 4											
2004	Austin Cameron	16	Chevy	PHO; 2	MMR; 12	CAL; 13	S99; 1	EVG; 1*	IRW; 1	S99; 17	RMR; 1	DCS; 6	PHO; 7	CNS; 2	MMR; 4	IRW; 1*			2nd	2074
2005	Steve Portenga	16	Chevy	PHO; 9	MMR; 3	PHO; 4	S99; 6	IRW; 1*	EVG; 18	S99; 4*	PPR; 1	CAL; 7	DCS; 3	CTS; 1*	MMR; 6				4th	1858
2006	Peyton Sellers	16	Chevy	PHO; 5	PHO; 2	S99; 15	IRW; 23	SON; 3	DCS; 1*	IRW; 16	EVG; 5	S99; 3	CAL; 21	CTS; 16	AMP; 20					
2007	Brian Ickler	16	Chevy	CTS; 23	PHO; 33	AMP; 13	ELK; 7	IOW; 12	CNS; 15*	SON; 6	DCS; 1	IRW; 1*	MMP; 6	EVG; 1*	CSR; 2	AMP; 16			4th	1838
2008	Moses Smith	16	Toyota	AAS; 5	PHO; 7	CTS; 16	IOW; 6	CNS; 6	SON; 28	IRW; 9	DCS; 7	EVG; 7	MMP; 4	IRW; 9	AMP; 11	AAS; 3			6th	1823
2009	Moses Smith	16	Toyota	CTS; 2	AAS; 8	PHO; 16	MAD; 8	IOW; 8	DCS; 5	SON; 29	IRW; 9	PIR; 14	MMP; 5	CNS; 3	IOW; 26	AAS; 5			7th	1766
2010	Moses Smith	16	Toyota	AAS; 8	PHO; 16	IOW; 14	DCS; 4	SON; 9	IRW; 4	PIR; 15	MRP; 3	CNS; 15	MMP; 4	AAS; 8	PHO; 10				4th	1678
2011	Moses Smith	16	Toyota	PHO; 8	AAS; 2	MMP; 2	IOW; 13	LVS; 20	SON; 7	IRW; 12	EVG; 3	PIR; 4	CNS; 6	MRP; 10	SPO; 5	AAS; 17	PHO; 17		3rd	1980
2013	Sergio Peña	16	Toyota	PHO; 5	S99; 2	BIR; 9														
2013	Eric Holmes	16	Toyota				IOW; 14	L44; 6	SON; 9	CNS; 8	IOW; 12	EVG; 12	SPO; 18	MMP; 19	SMP; 4	AAS; 3	KCR; 3			
2013	Shane Golobic	16	Toyota															PHO; 21		
2014	Brandon McReynolds	16	Toyota	PHO; 8	IRW; 4	S99; 4	IOW; 14	KCR; 4	SON; 5	SLS; 3	CNS; 4	IOW; 3	EVG; 2	KCR; 2	MMP; 5	AAS; 3	PHO; 20		4th	538
2015	Brandon McReynolds	16	Toyota	KCR; 27	IRW; 12	TUS; 8	IOW; 1	SHA; 7	SON; 19	SLS; 8	IOW; 1*	EVG; 12	CNS; 5	MER; 2	AAS; 24	PHO; 3			7th	455
2016	Todd Gilliland	16	Toyota	IRW; 1	KCR; 1*	TUS; 2	OSS; 4	CNS; 2	SON; 24	SLS; 1	IOW; 1*	EVG; 1*	DCS; 6*	MMP; 2	MMP; 2	MER; 1	AAS; 8		1st	594
2017	Todd Gilliland	16	Toyota	TUS; 2	KCR; 1	IRW; 1*	IRW; 1*	SPO; 1*	OSS; 6	CNS; 3*	SON; 6	IOW; 1*	EVG; 8	DCS; 1	MER; 2*	AAS; 2	KCR; 2		1st	610
2018	Derek Kraus	16	Toyota	KCR; 1	TUS; 4	TUS; 11	OSS; 5	CNS; 4	SON; 10	DCS; 1*	IOW; 20	EVG; 9	GTW; 1*	LVS; 17*	MER; 3*	AAS; 15	KCR; 1*		4th	543
2019	Derek Kraus	16	Toyota	LVS; 6*	IRW; 3*	TUS; 1**	TUS; 1*	CNS; 8	SON; 19	DCS; 1**	IOW; 4	EVG; 2	GTW; 2	MER; 1	AAS; 4	KCR; 1**	PHO; 3		1st	591
2020	Gio Scelzi	16	Toyota	LVS; 10	MMP; 3	MMP; 4	IRW; 14	EVG; 3	DCS; 4	CNS; 3	LVS; 2	AAS; 1	KCR; 9	PHO; 27					5th	560
2021	Jesse Love	16	Toyota	PHO; 6	SON; 19	IRW; 1	CNS; 2*	IRW; 1	PIR; 3	LVS; 13	AAS; 12	PHO; 14							1st	438
2022	Austin Herzog	16	Chevy	PHO; 14	IRW; 3	KCR; 8	PIR; 9	SON; 6											5th	550
2022	Landen Lewis	16	Chevy						IRW; 5	EVG; 6	PIR; 9	AAS; 17	LVS; 3	PHO; 6					5th	550
2023	Tanner Reif	16	Chevy	PHO; 12	IRW; 5	KCR; 4	PIR; 14	SON; 20	IRW; 3	SHA; 7	EVG; 15	AAS; 3	LVS; 3	MAD; 17	PHO; 8				5th	517
2024	Jack Wood	16	Chevy	PHO; 7	KER; 12	PIR; 12	SON; 5	IRW; 14	IRW; 2	SHA; 6	TRI; 3	MAD; 12	AAS; 5	KER; 5	PHO; 11				4th	534
2025	Jack Wood	16	Chevy	KER	PHO	TUC	CNS	KER	SON; 13	TRI	PIR	AAS	MAD	LVS	PHO				39th	31
2026	Hailie Deegan	16	Chevy	KER; 9	PHO; 11	TUC; 7	SHA; 7	CNS; 7	TRI; 14	SON; 20	PIR; 3	AAS; 3	MAD; 1	LVS; 16	PHO; 6	KER; 1				

=== Car No. 18 history ===
In 2004, the team fielded the No. 18 car for Kerry Earnhardt at Evergreen Speedway. He finished fourth.

In 2006, the No. 18 car made a return with Eric Hardin as the full-time driver.

In 2007, Moses Smith drove the No. 18 car full-time.

In 2008, Smith moved to the flagship No. 16 car. Austin Cameron drove the No. 18 car full-time.

==== Car No. 18 results ====
Year	Driver	No.	Make	1	2	3	4	5	6	7	8	9	10	11	12	13	AMSWC	Pts
2004	Kerry Earnhardt	18	Chevy	PHO	MMR	CAL	S99	EVG; 4	IRW	S99	RMR	DCS	PHO	CNS	MMR	IRW		
2006	Eric Hardin	18	Chevy	PHO; 24	PHO; 27	S99; 9	IRW; 20	SON; 20	DCS; 11	IRW; 22	EVG; 14	S99; 10	CAL; 13	CTS; 10	AMP; 19			
2007	Moses Smith	18	Chevy	CTS; 27	PHO; 28	AMP; 15	ELK; 11	IOW; DNQ	CNS; 9	SON; 28	DCS; 7	IRW; 21	MMP; 11	EVG; 6	CSR; 15	AMP; 17		
2008	Austin Cameron	18	Toyota	AAS; 17	PHO; 13	CTS; 2	IOW	CNS; 8	SON; 7	IRW; 6	DCS; 18	EVG; 14	MMP; 3	IRW; 24	AMP; 5	AAS; 21		

=== Car No. 19 history ===
In 2016, the team fielded the No. 19 Toyota Camry full-time for Riley Herbst.

In January 2017, the team announced that Derek Kraus would drive the No. 19 Toyota Camry full-time.

In January 2018, the team announced that Hailie Deegan would drive the No. 19 Toyota Camry full-time. At the Dirt Track at Las Vegas Motor Speedway, Deegan qualified on pole position for the Star Nursery 100, becoming the first woman in NASCAR history to win a pole at the K&N level. Despite a shifter issue during the first half of the race, she led 13 laps and equalled her career best result of second in the event. On September 29, Deegan became the first woman to win at the K&N Pro Series level, taking the victory at the NAPA Auto Parts Idaho 208 at Meridian Speedway in Idaho. Deegan passed her BMR teammate Cole Rouse on the final lap, which ended up being the only lap she led throughout the race. Her win was the second for a woman in a NASCAR touring series race, the first being Shawna Robinson's one win in the 1980s in the now-defunct NASCAR Dash Series. With a sixth-place finish two races later at the K&N West season finale at Kern County, Deegan closed the year by clinching Rookie of the Year honors for the series.

Deegan returned to BMR in 2019 for another full and partial schedule in the K&N West and East Series respectively. Deegan earned her second career K&N Pro Series win in the event with another last-lap pass, this time on Sunrise Ford Racing's Jagger Jones. At Colorado National Speedway, Deegan earned her third career K&N West win, though some deemed the victory controversial as she spun out Kraus, her teammate, for the win on the final lap.

In January 2020, it was announced that Jesse Love would run full-time and for rookie of the year in the No. 19 Toyota. Love finished the 2020 ARCA West season with 3 wins and 9 top 5 finishes in 11 races en route to the championship, beating out season-long rival Blaine Perkins. He became the youngest West Series champion at just 15 years, 9 months, and 24 days old.

In 2021, Love moved to the flagship No. 16 Toyota. As the result, the No. 19 only run part-time with multiple drivers such as Derek Kraus, Eric Nascimento, Amber Balcaen, Jolynn Wilkinson, and Sebastian Arias.

In 2022, Kraus drove the No. 19 Chevrolet SS at season opener at Phoenix. He finished 9th. Sean Hingorani made his ARCA west debut at All American Speedway in the No. 19 Toyota.

In 2023, Eric Johnson Jr. would run part-time in the ARCA Menards Series West, driving the No. 19 car. He previously being a crew member and spotter for drivers like Derek Kraus, Jesse Love, and Cole Moore.

On January 19, 2024, it was announced that Johnson Jr. would run full-time in the West Series in 2024, driving the No. 19 Chevrolet.

In 2025, Daniel Hemric drove the No. 19 Chevrolet at season opener at Kern Raceway. He won the pole and finished 9th. For the remainder of the season, Jake Bollman will drive the No. 19 for all nine of the remaining ovals, while Christian Eckes will drive the No. 19 at the road courses at Sonoma Raceway and Portland International Raceway. Bollman earned back-to-back poles at Tucson Speedway and at Colorado National Speedway, where he would earn his first career win.

On January 13, 2026, it was announced that Mason Massey will drive full-time in the ARCA Menards Series West, driving the No. 19 Chevrolet. Massey scored his first career victory at season opener at Kern Raceway. He followed it up with another victory at Portland.

==== Car No. 19 results ====
Year	Driver	No.	Make	1	2	3	4	5	6	7	8	9	10	11	12	13	14	Owners	Pts
2016	Riley Herbst	19	Toyota	IRW; 6	KCR; 4	TUS; 7	OSS; 16	CNS; 13	SON; 5	SLS; 7	IOW; 3	EVG; 3	DCS; 3	MMP; 5	MMP; 4	MER; 19	AAS; 12		
2017	Derek Kraus	19	Toyota	TUS; 6	KCR; 2	IRW; 18	IRW; 4	SPO; 2	OSS; 16	CNS; 2	SON; 5	IOW; 11	EVG; 11	DCS; 3	MER; 5	AAS; 4	KCR; 1		
2018	Hailie Deegan	19	Toyota	KCR; 7	TUS; 8	TUS; 8	OSS; 4	CNS; 5	SON; 7	DCS; 2	IOW; 21	EVG; 7	GTW; 23	LVS; 2	MER; 1	AAS; 7	KCR; 6		
2019	Hailie Deegan	19	Toyota	LVS; 1	IRW; 5	TUS; 3	TUS; 15	CNS; 1*	SON; 8	DCS; 3	IOW; 12	EVG; 7	GTW; 9	MER; 13	AAS; 2	KCR; 3	PHO; 4		
2020	Jesse Love	19	Toyota	LVS; 2	MMP; 1*	MMP; 2	IRW; 1*	EVG; 4	DCS; 3	CNS; 1*	LVS; 3	AAS; 4	KCR; 8	PHO; 14				1st	613
2021	Derek Kraus	19	Toyota	PHO; 5														13th	286
2021	Eric Nascimento	19	Toyota		SON; 14													13th	286
2021	Amber Balcaen	19	Toyota			IRW; 15		IRW; 11	PIR	LVS; 22	AAS							13th	286
2021	Jolynn Wilkinson	19	Toyota				CNS; 8											13th	286
2021	Sebastian Arias	19	Toyota									PHO; 26						13th	286
2022	Derek Kraus	19	Chevy	PHO; 9	IRW	KCR	PIR	SON	IRW	EVG	PIR								
2022	Sean Hingorani	19	Toyota									AAS; 15							
2023	Eric Johnson Jr.	19	Chevy	PHO	IRW	KCR	PIR; 10	SON; 27	IRW	SHA								23rd	119
2023	Eric Johnson Jr.	19	Toyota								EVG; 11	AAS; 9	LVS	MAD	PHO			23rd	119
2024	Eric Johnson Jr.	19	Chevy	PHO; 20	KER; 10	PIR; 19	SON; 7	IRW; 11	IRW; 10	SHA; 12	TRI; 13	MAD; 4	AAS; 8	KER; 9	PHO; 15			5th	540
2025	Daniel Hemric	19	Chevy	KER; 9														10th	413
2025	Jake Bollman	19	Chevy		PHO; 24	TUC; 3	CNS; 1**	KER; 12		TRI; 2*		AAS; 7	MAD; 16	LVS	PHO			10th	413
2025	Christian Eckes	19	Chevy						SON; 2		PIR; 14							10th	413
2026	Mason Massey	19	Chevy	KER; 1	PHO	TUC; 12	SHA; 3	CNS; 4	TRI; 5	SON; 19	PIR; 1	AAS; 17	MAD; 5	LVS; 6	PHO; 3	KER; 9			

=== Car No. 20 history ===
In 2003, BMR fielded the No. 20 Chevrolet for Jim Inglebright. He won one race and finishing in the top-ten 11 times.

In 2004, the No. 20 car was driven by a slew of drivers such as Clint Bowyer, John Moore, Jeff Jefferson, Kerry Earnhardt, and Sarah Fisher.

In 2005, BMR signed Fisher to drive the No. 20 full-time for Richard Childress Racing's development program through NASCAR's Drive for Diversity. She began the season with a 20th-place finish in the United Rentals 100 at Phoenix. Three races later, Fisher had her first lead-lap finish, coming in 12th in the Autozone Twin Championships before earning her first top-ten result, an eighth in the King Taco 150 at Irwindale Speedway. She qualified a season-high third in the Coors Light 200 at Evergreen Speedway; Fisher led the first laps for a woman in NASCAR West Series history, finishing 11th.

In 2006, BMR signed Brian Ickler to drive the No. 20 NAPA Filters Chevrolet full-time.

In 2007, Ickler moved to the flagship No. 16 car while Eric Richardson was signed to drive the No. 20 car full-time. He failed to qualify for one race at Elko Speedway.

In 2008, BMR signed Eric Holmes to drive the No. 20 Toyota full-time. He won at All-American Speedway, Colorado National Speedway, Thunderhill Raceway Park and Douglas County Speedway, winning his second championship along with five poles and nine top-fives.

During the 2009 season, Holmes won at All-American Speedway, Madera Speedway and Douglas County Speedway and finishing in second in points.

For 2010, Holmes got a record high five wins and clinched his third championship with victories at Phoenix International Raceway, his third straight at Douglas County Speedway, Montana Raceway Park, Colorado National Speedway, and his third win at All-American Speedway.

In 2011, Holmes won twice at Spokane Raceway Park and All American Speedway.

In 2012, Holmes only won once at Evergreen Speedway.

In 2013, the No. 20 car was scaled back to part-time entry with multiple drivers behind the wheel.

In 2015, BMR fielded the No. 20 for Cole Moore at All-American Speedway. He finished 19th.

In 2016, Moore ran six races at Colorado National Speedway, Stateline Speedway, Evergreen Speedway, Utah Motorsports Campus (2), and All-American Speedway. His best finish was seventh at Roseville.

Moore ran one race in 2017, finishing seventh at Roseville.

In 2026, BMR fielded the No. 20 Chevrolet for Patrick Staropoli at Sonoma. Vito Cancilla would make his ARCA Menards Series West debut at Las Vegas Motor Speedway Bullring. He would also drive the No. 20 at season finale at Kern Raceway.

==== Car No. 20 results ====
Year	Driver	No.	Make	1	2	3	4	5	6	7	8	9	10	11	12	13	14	15	AMSWC	Pts
2003	Jim Inglebright	20	Chevy	PHO; 3	LVS; 1*	CAL; 15	MAD; 8	TCR; 9	EVG; 11	IRW; 22	S99; 15	RMR; 10	DCS; 4	PHO; 5	MMR; 11					
2004	Clint Bowyer	20	Chevy	PHO; 8		CAL; 2*														
2004	John Moore	20	Chevy		MMR; 15		S99; 7													
2004	Jeff Jefferson	20	Chevy					EVG; 2												
2004	Kerry Earnhardt	20	Chevy						IRW; 7	S99; 20	RMR; 6	DCS; 7		CNS; 4	MMR; 21	IRW; 13				
2004	Sarah Fisher	20	Chevy										PHO; 21							
2005	Sarah Fisher	20	Chevy	PHO; 20	MMR; 16	PHO; 28	S99; 12	IRW; 8	EVG; 11	S99; 17	PPR; 9	CAL; 22	DCS; 12	CTS; 6	MMR; 7					
2006	Brian Ickler	20	Chevy	PHO; 6	PHO; 16	S99; 19	IRW; 8	SON; 2	DCS; 13	IRW; 27	EVG; 17	S99; 12	CAL; 7	CTS; 2	AMP; 8					
2007	Eric Richardson	20	Chevy	CTS; 25	PHO; 6	AMP; 17	ELK; DNQ	IOW; 6	CNS; 4	SON; 19	DCS; 9	IRW; 8	MMP; 7	EVG; 17	CSR; 6	AMP; 9				
2008	Eric Holmes	20	Toyota	AAS; 1**	PHO; 23*	CTS; 1	IOW; 12	CNS; 1*	SON; 2	IRW; 2	DCS; 1*	EVG; 2	MMP; 16	IRW; 8	AMP; 4*	AAS; 5*			1st	2098
2009	Eric Holmes	20	Toyota	CTS; 3	AAS; 1*	PHO; 2	MAD; 1	IOW; 16	DCS; 1**	SON; 3	IRW; 6	PIR; 7	MMP; 8	CNS; 9*	IOW; 10	AAS; 16			2nd	2035
2010	Eric Holmes	20	Toyota	AAS; 20	PHO; 1	IOW; 3	DCS; 1*	SON; 4	IRW; 10	PIR; 2	MRP; 1	CNS; 1*	MMP; 6	AAS; 1*	PHO; 15				1st	1945
2011	Eric Holmes	20	Toyota	PHO; 14	AAS; 6	MMP; 13*	IOW; 6	LVS; 22	SON; 3	IRW; 4	EVG; 4	PIR; 2	CNS; 5	MRP; 3	SPO; 1	AAS; 1	PHO; 4		2nd	2062
2012	Eric Holmes	20	Toyota	PHO; 8	LHC; 5	MMP; 2	S99; 2	IOW; 9	BIR; 3	LVS; 19	SON; 23	EVG; 1*	CNS; 7	IOW; 3	PIR; 3	SMP; 3	AAS; 2*	PHO; 20	4th	557
2013	Brandon McReynolds	20	Toyota	PHO; 9														PHO; 5		
2013	Eric Holmes	20	Toyota		S99; 5	BIR	IOW	L44												
2013	Paulie Harraka	20	Toyota						SON; 5											
2013	Jamie Krzysik	20	Toyota							CNS; 2	IOW	EVG								
2013	Michael Waltrip	20	Toyota										SPO; 11	MMP						
2013	Chase Briscoe	20	Toyota												SMP; 8					
2013	Shane Golobic	20	Toyota													AAS; 8	KCR; 8			
2015	Cole Moore	20	Toyota	KCR	IRW	TUS	IOW	SHA	SON	SLS	IOW	EVG	CNS	MER	AAS; 19	PHO				
2016	Cole Moore	20	Toyota	IRW	KCR	TUS	OSS	CNS; 14	SON	SLS; 14	IOW	EVG; 10	DCS	UMC; 18	UMC; 17	MER	AAS; 7			
2017	Cole Moore	20	Toyota	TUS	KCR	IRW	IRW	SPO	OSS	CNS	SON	IOW	EVG	DCS	MER	AAS; 7	KCR			
2026	Patrick Staropoli	20	Chevy	KER	PHO	TUC	SHA	CNS	TRI	SON; 5	PIR	AAS	MAD							
2026	Vito Cancilla	20	Chevy											LVS; 4	PHO	KER; 10				

=== Car No. 21 history ===
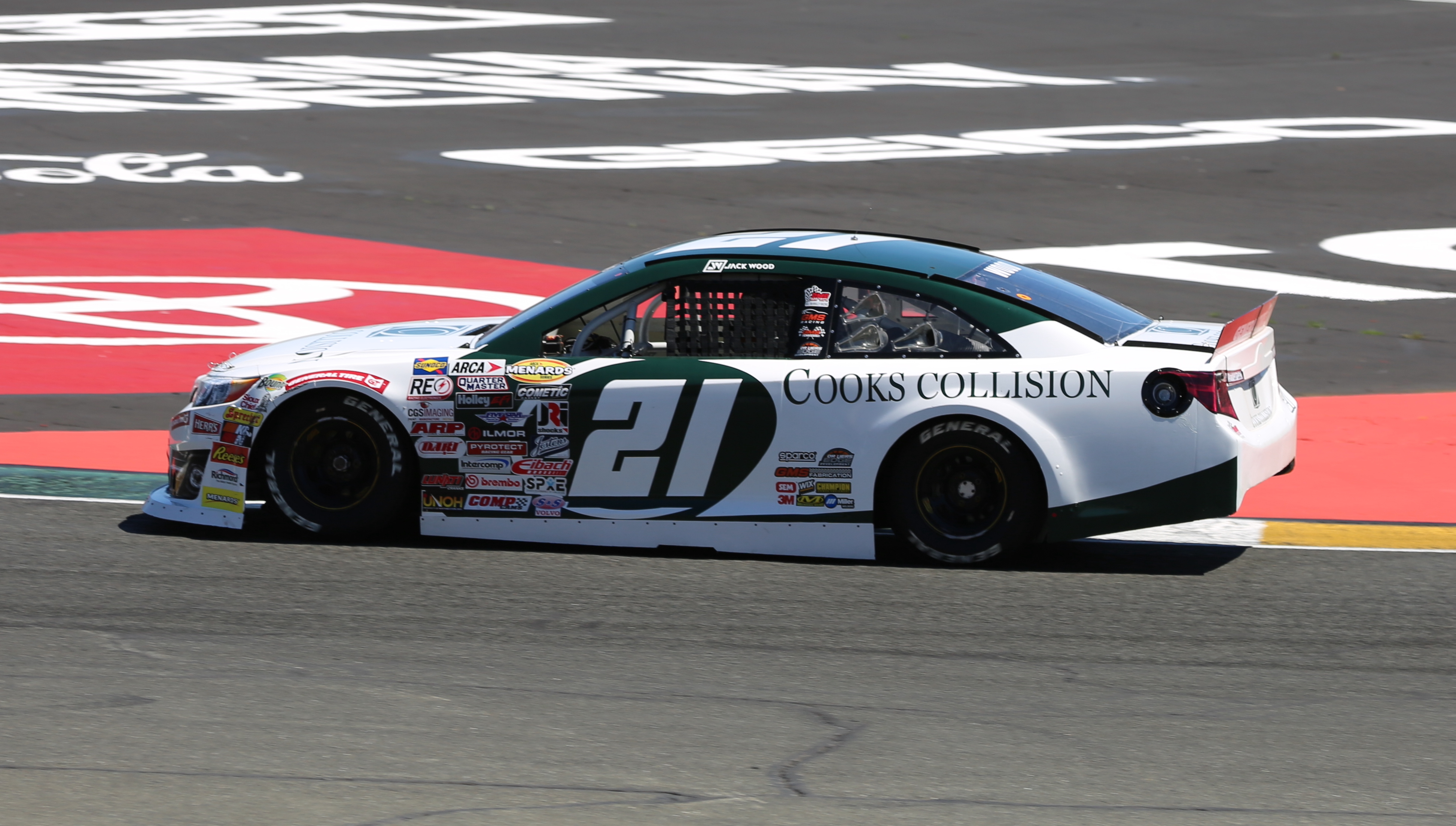
Jack Wood in the No. 21 car at Sonoma Raceway in 2022.

In 2022, the team fielded the No. 21 car in partnership with GMS Racing for Jack Wood at Sonoma. He finished fourth.

==== Car No. 21 results ====
Year	Driver	No.	Make	1	2	3	4	5	6	7	8	9	10	11	AMSWC	Pts
2022	Jack Wood	21	Toyota	PHO	IRW	KCR	PIR	SON; 4	IRW	EVG	PIR	AAS	LVS	PHO		

=== Car No. 24 history ===
In 2011, BMR signed 15 years old Cameron Hayley to run the last four races of the season in the No. 24 car. Hayley became the youngest driver ever to run a NASCAR sanctioned race. Hayley ran four races that season, and the full 2012 season, scoring seven top-fives and 11 top-tens in total.

In 2018, the No. 24 car made a return at Sonoma Raceway with Alex Bowman as the driver. He finished 24th.

In 2023, BMR fielded the No. 24 car for Dylan Lupton at Portland International Raceway. He finished 21st.

==== Car No. 24 results ====
Year	Driver	No.	Make	1	2	3	4	5	6	7	8	9	10	11	12	13	14	15	AMSWC	Pts
2011	Cameron Hayley	24	Toyota	PHO	AAS	MMP	IOW	LVS	SON	IRW	EVG	PIR	CNS	MRP; 2	SPO; 18	AAS; 3	PHO; 40			
2012	Cameron Hayley	24	Toyota	PHO; 22	LVC; 6	MMP; 8	S99; 14	IOW; 6	BIR; 12	LVS; 5	SON; 10	EVG; 19	CNS; 3	IOW; 2	PIR; 22	SMP; 15	AAS; 5	PHO; 5		
2018	Alex Bowman	24	Chevy	KCR	TUS	TUS	OSS	CNS	SON; 24	DCS	IOW	EVG	GTW	LVS	MER	AAS	KCR			
2023	Dylan Lupton	24	Chevy	PHO	IRW	KCR	PIR; 21	SON	IRW	SHA	EVG	AAS	LVS	MAD	PHO					

=== Car No. 27 history ===
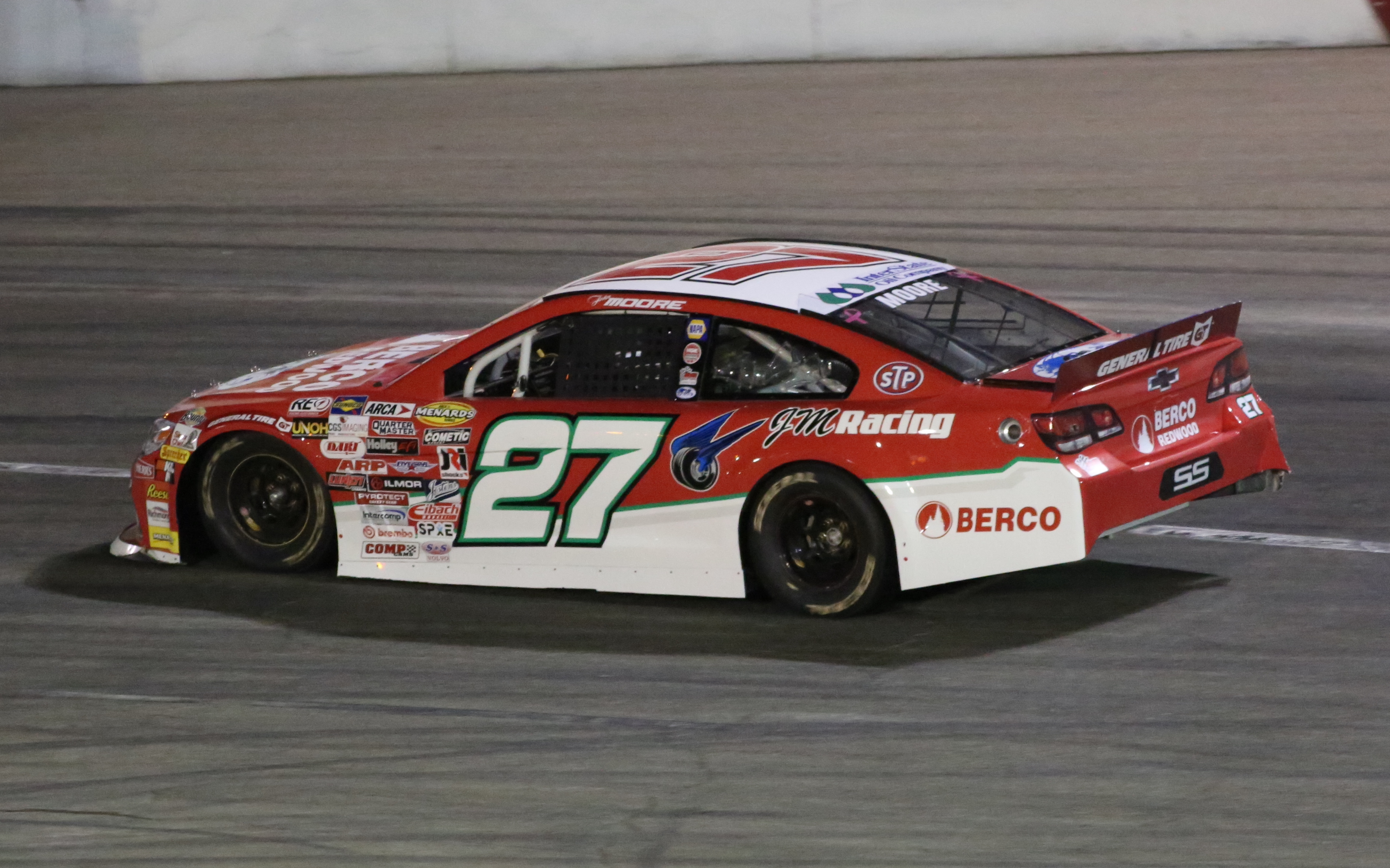
John Moore in the No. 27 car at All American Speedway in 2022.

In 2022, the team fielded the No. 27 car for John Moore at All American Speedway. He finished eighth.

==== Car No. 27 results ====
Year	Driver	No.	Make	1	2	3	4	5	6	7	8	9	10	11	AMSWC	Pts
2022	John Moore	27	Chevy	PHO	IRW	KCR	PIR	SON	IRW	EVG	PIR	AAS; 8	LVS	PHO		

=== Car No. 43 history ===
In 2017, BMR fielded the No. 43 car for Derek Thorn at Sonoma Raceway. He finished 28th.

In 2022, the No. 43 car made a return at Portland International Raceway with Daniel Dye as the driver. He won the pole and finished fourth.

==== Car No. 43 results ====
Year	Driver	No.	Make	1	2	3	4	5	6	7	8	9	10	11	12	13	14	AMSWC	Pts
2017	Derek Thorn	43	Toyota	TUS	KCR	IRW	IRW	SPO	OSS	CNS	SON; 28	IOW	EVG	DCS	MER	AAS	KCR		
2022	Daniel Dye	43	Chevy	PHO	IRW	KCR	PIR; 4	SON	IRW	EVG	PIR	AAS	LVS	PHO					

=== Car No. 50 history ===
In 2016, BMR moved Chris Eggleston from the No. 99 car to the brand new No. 50 car full-time. He won twice at Orange Show Speedway and Colorado National Speedway.

Eggelston moved back to the No. 99 car in 2017. However, he returned to the No. 50 car in 2018 At All American Speedway.

In 2019, Dylan Garner made his debut in the K&N Pro Series West, driving the No. 50 Toyota Camry at Irwindale. He scored a top-ten on debut for the team, finishing ninth in the race. Garner returned to BMR for the races at Roseville and Kern County. Daniel Hemric drove the No. 50 Chevrolet SS at Sonoma Raceway. He finished second.

On January 14, 2020, it was announced that Holley Hollan would drive the No. 50 Toyota Camry full-time, along with select other races in other series for the team. She would fare better in the first half of the season, with four top-tens in six starts. However, she would miss the final race of the season.

==== Car No. 50 results ====
Year	Driver	No.	Make	1	2	3	4	5	6	7	8	9	10	11	12	13	14	AMSWC	Pts
2016	Chris Eggleston	50	Toyota	IRW; 3	KCR; 5	TUS; 3	OSS; 1	CNS; 1*	SON; 26	SLS; 3*	IOW; 25	EVG; 2	DCS; 7	MMP; 21	MMP; 19	MER; 9	AAS; 2		
2018	Chris Eggleston	50	Toyota	KCR	TUS	TUS	OSS	CNS	SON	DCS	IOW	EVG	GTW	LVS	MER	AAS; 12	KCR		
2019	Dylan Garner	50	Toyota	LVS	IRW; 9	TUS	TUS	CNS							AAS; 12	KCR; 7	PHO		
2019	Daniel Hemric	50	Chevy						SON; 2	DCS	IOW	EVG	GTW	MER					
2020	Holley Hollan	50	Toyota	LVS; 12	UMC; 9	UMC; 10	IRW; 11	EVG; 6	DCS; 7	CNS; 7	LVS; 9	AAS; 6	KCR; 15	PHO					

=== Car No. 54 history ===
In 2015, BMR fielded the No. 54 car part-time for Christopher Bell, Blaine Perkins, and Todd Gilliland. At Phoenix International Raceway, Gilliland taking the lead with five laps to go after J. J. Haley's tire went down and defeated William Byron on the green–white–checker finish to win. The win made Gilliland the youngest race winner in track history. In postrace inspection, Gilliland's car was found to have the lubrication oil reservoir tank cover bolted improperly. As a result, his team received a P5 penalty (the second-worst in NASCAR) and was docked 30 points, although Gilliland was allowed to keep the victory.

In 2016, McAnally and his business partner, record executive and former Lieutenant Governor of California Mike Curb selected Julia Landauer to drive the No. 54 Toyota Camry full-time. She finished eighth in her debut at Irwindale Speedway, going on to record seven top-five finishes and 13 top-tens in 14 races, for which she was honored with the 2016 Driver Achievement Award and named the series's Top Breakthrough Driver.

In 2017, McAnally fielded the No. 54 car part-time for Riley Herbst and Will Gallaher.

==== Car No. 54 results ====
Year	Driver	No.	Make	1	2	3	4	5	6	7	8	9	10	11	12	13	14	AMSWC	Pts
2015	Christopher Bell	54	Toyota	KCR	IRW; 15	TUS	IOW; 2	SHA	SON	SLS	IOW	EVG	CNS	MER					
2015	Blaine Perkins	54	Toyota												AAS; 13				
2015	Todd Gilliland	54	Toyota													PHO; 1			
2016	Julia Landauer	54	Toyota	IRW; 8	KCR; 10	TUS; 5	OSS; 5	CNS; 6	SON; 11	SLS; 5	IOW; 8	EVG; 8	DCS; 5	MMP; 4	MMP; 8	MER; 2	AAS; 3		
2017	Riley Herbst	54	Toyota	TUS; 9	KCR	IRW	IRW	SPO	OSS	CNS							KCR; 3		
2017	Will Gallaher	54	Toyota								SON; 20	IOW	EVG	DCS	MER	AAS			

=== Car No. 55 history ===
In 2013, BMR fielded the No. 55 Toyota Camry for Michael Waltrip at All American Speedway. He finished 20th with transmission issue.

In 2014, BMR fielded the No. 55 Toyota Camry for Haas Racing development driver Nick Drake at Phoenix. He finished third.

==== Car No. 55 results ====
Year	Driver	No.	Make	1	2	3	4	5	6	7	8	9	10	11	12	13	14	15	AMSWC	Pts
2013	Michael Waltrip	55	Toyota	PHO	S99	BIR	IOW	L44	SON	CNS	IOW	EVG	SPO	MMP	SMP	AAS; 20	KCR	PHO		
2014	Nick Drake	55	Toyota	PHO; 3	IRW	S99	IOW	KCR	SON	SLS	CNS	IOW	EVG	KCR	MMP	AAS	PHO			

=== Car No. 60 history ===
In 2015, BMR fielded the No. 60 car for Trevor Bayne at Sonoma. He finished tenth.

In 2018, the No. 60 car made a return at 2018 Star Nursery 100 with Christopher Bell as the driver. He finished tenth.

==== Car No. 60 results ====
Year	Driver	No.	Make	1	2	3	4	5	6	7	8	9	10	11	12	13	14	AMSWC	Pts
2015	Trevor Bayne	60	Ford	KCR	IRW	TUS	IOW	SHA	SON; 10	SLS	IOW	EVG	CNS	MER	AAS	PHO			
2018	Christopher Bell	60	Toyota	KCR	TUS	TUS	OSS	CNS	SON	DCS	IOW	EVG	GTW	LVS; 10	MER	AAS	KCR		

=== Car No. 61 history ===
In 2002, BMR fielded the No. 61 car full-time for Brett Thompson.

==== Car No. 61 results ====
Year	Driver	No.	Make	1	2	3	4	5	6	7	8	9	10	AMSWC	Pts
2002	Brett Thompson	61	Chevy	PHO; 14	LVS; 20	CAL; 6	KAN; 6	EVG; 10	IRW; 9	S99; 8	RMR; 12	DCS; 18	LVS; 3		

=== Car No. 62 history ===
In 2018, BMR fielded the No. 62 car for Brendan Gaughan at Las Vegas Motor Speedway Bullring. He finished fifth.

==== Car No. 62 results ====
Year	Driver	No.	Make	1	2	3	4	5	6	7	8	9	10	11	12	13	14	AMSWC	Pts
2018	Brendan Gaughan	62	Toyota	KCR	TUS	TUS	OSS	CNS	SON	DCS	IOW	EVG	GTW	LVS; 5	MER	AAS	KCR		

=== Car No. 81 history ===
BMR fielded the No. 81 car part-time for Canadian driver D. J. Kennington from 2011 to 2013.

In 2026, BMR fielded the No. 81 for Mason Massey at Phoenix.

==== Car No. 81 results ====
Year	Driver	No.	Make	1	2	3	4	5	6	7	8	9	10	11	12	13	14	15	AMSWC	Pts
2011	D. J. Kennington	81	Toyota	PHO	AAS	MMP	IOW	LVS	SON	IRW	EVG	PIR	CNS	MRP	SPO	AAS	PHO; 11			
2012	D. J. Kennington	81	Toyota	PHO; 10	LHC	MMP	S99	IOW	BIR	LVS	SON	EVG	CNS	IOW	PIR	SMP	AAS	PHO		
2013	D. J. Kennington	81	Toyota	PHO; 7	S99	BIR	IOW	L44	SON	CNS	IOW	EVG	SPO	MMP	SMP	AAS	KCR	PHO		
2026	Mason Massey	81	Chevy	KER	PHO; 5	TUC	SHA	CNS	TRI	SON	PIR	AAS	MAD	LVS	PHO	KER				

=== Car No. 91 history ===
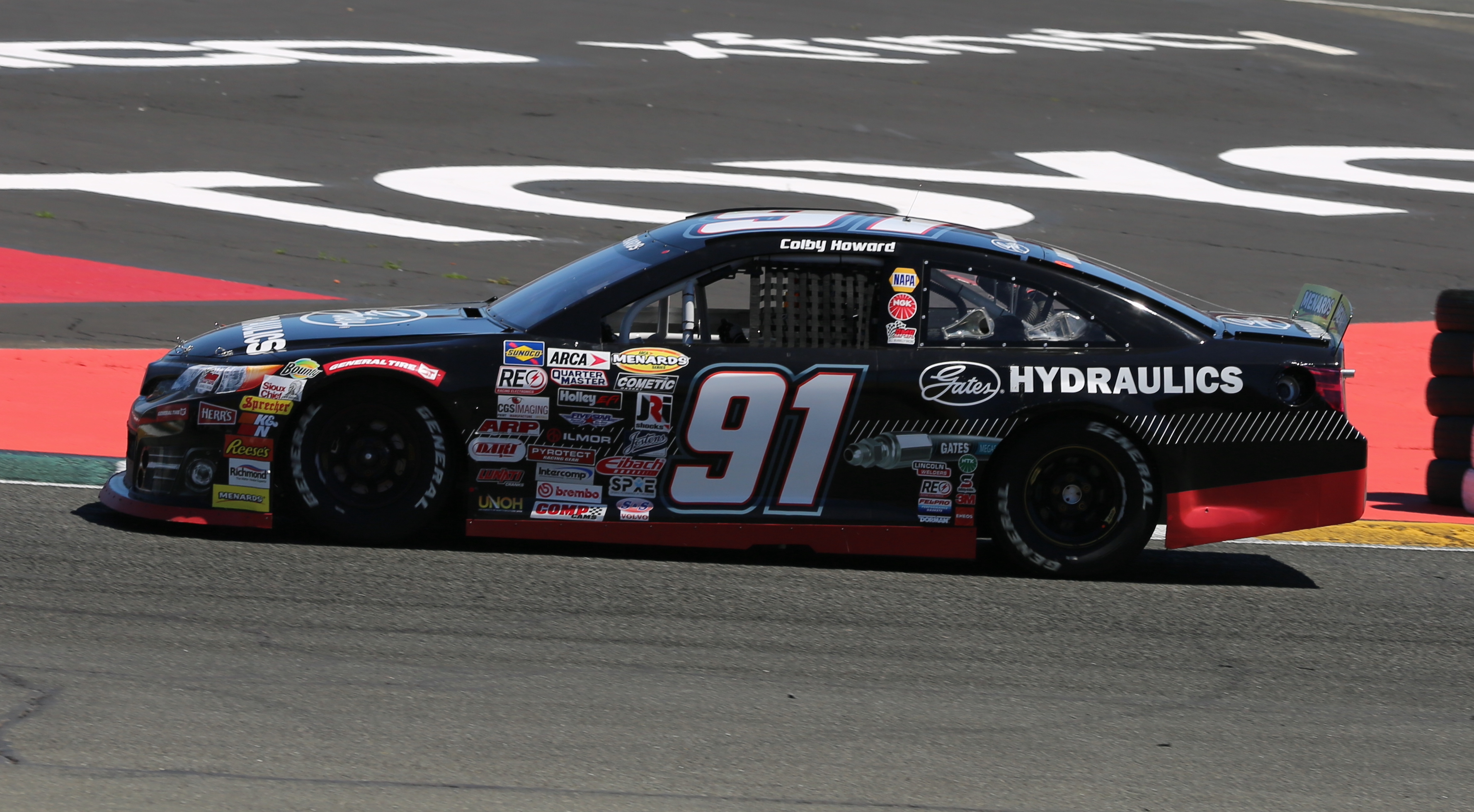
Colby Howard in the No. 91 car at Sonoma Raceway in 2022

In 2022, BMR fielded the No. 91 car for Colby Howard at Sonoma. He finished second.

==== Car No. 91 results ====
Year	Driver	No.	Make	1	2	3	4	5	6	7	8	9	10	11	AMSWC	Pts
2022	Colby Howard	91	Toyota	PHO	IRW	KCR	PIR	SON; 2	IRW	EVG	PIR	AAS	LVS	PHO		

=== Car No. 99 history ===
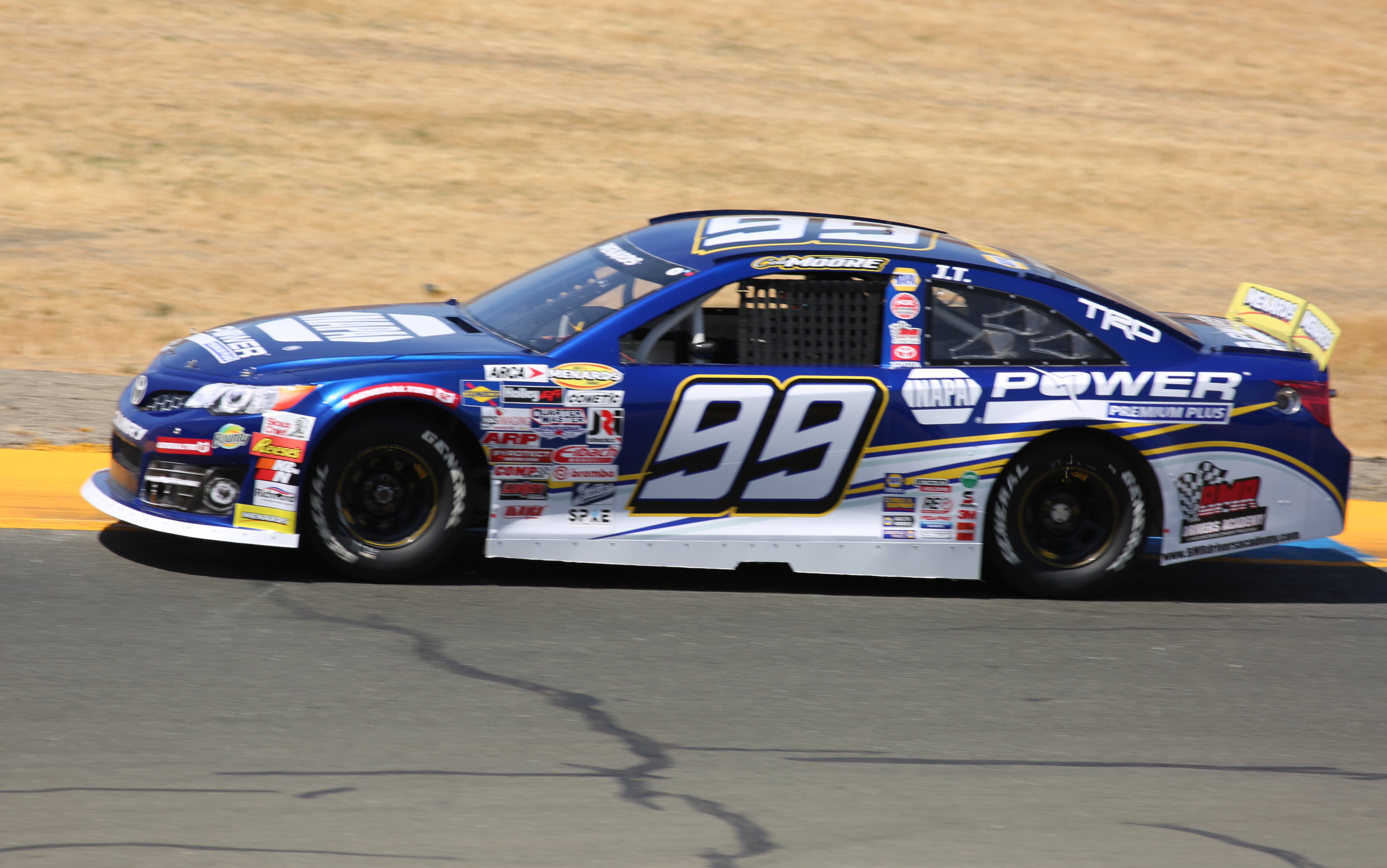
Cole Moore in the No. 99 car at Sonoma in 2021

In 2012, BMR fielded the No. 99 car for Finnish driver Markus Niemelä at All American Speedway. He finished 15th.

In 2013, the team fielded the No. 99 car part-time for Jamie Krzysik, Patrick Staropoli, and Chase Briscoe.

In 2014, the No. 99 car was split between Staropoli, Ricky Stenhouse Jr., Chris Eggleston, Gracin Raz, Christian PaHud, and Nick Drake.

In 2015, BMR signed Eggleston to drive the No. 99 car full-time. He won the championship at the end of the season.

Eggleston moved to the team's No. 50 car in 2016. However, he returned to the No. 99 car in 2017.

In 2018, BMR signed Cole Rouse to drive the No. 99 car full-time. On October 13, 2018, Rouse took pole position and converted it into his first career K&N Pro Series win at All American Speedway.

In 2019, Brittney Zamora was signed as the driver of the No. 99 Toyota Camry.

On January 14, 2020, Gracie Trotter was announced as the full-time driver of the No. 99 Toyota Camry. Trotter finished fourth in her debut race at the Las Vegas Motor Speedway (LVMS) Bullring, before the COVID-19 pandemic put the season on hold. She returned from the hiatus with a pair of seventh-place finishes, followed by a career-best third at Irwindale Speedway. At Douglas County Speedway, Trotter again earned a new career-best finish, placing second to race winner Blaine Perkins. She won her first ARCA West race on September 26 at the LVMS Bullring, making her the second female driver to win a West Series race and the first to win an event sanctioned by ARCA.

In 2021, BMR signed Cole Moore to drive the No. 99 car full-time. He collected 6 top tens and 4 top fives and led 114 laps, including 79 at Roseville. His best finishes were fourth at both Sonoma Raceway and Colorado National Speedway. That year, Moore made his ARCA Menards Series debut, running in the combination race with the West Series at Phoenix Raceway, finishing 12th. At the end of the year, Moore won the 2021 ARCA Menards Series West Rookie of the Year award.

In 2022, Moore ran another full season for BMR in the West Series in their No. 99 car. He won his first race in the series at All-American Speedway in October. Also, in that same race, he competed against his father, John Moore, for the first time in the West Series, who drove an additional car for BMR, the No. 27. Moore would finish the season third in the final standings.

In 2023, BMR fielded the No. 99 Chevrolet for Caleb Shrader at Portland International Raceway, where after placing 13th in the lone practice session, he qualified in ninth and finished on the lead lap in seventh place.

==== Car No. 99 results ====
Year	Driver	No.	Make	1	2	3	4	5	6	7	8	9	10	11	12	13	14	15	AMSWC	Pts
2012	Markus Niemelä	99	Toyota	PHO	LHC	MMP	S99	IOW	BIR	LVS	SON	EVG	CNS	IOW	PIR	SMP	AAS; 15	PHO		
2013	Jamie Krzysik	99	Toyota	PHO; 11	S99; 13	BIR	IOW	L44	SON	CNS	IOW	EVG								
2013	Patrick Staropoli	99	Toyota										SPO; 5	MMP	SMP	AAS; 6				
2013	Chase Briscoe	99	Toyota														KCR; 13	PHO; 27		
2014	Patrick Staropoli	99	Toyota	PHO	IRW; 1	S99	IOW; 3	KCR												
2014	Ricky Stenhouse Jr.	99	Ford						SON; 4	SLS										
2014	Chris Eggleston	99	Toyota								CNS; 1*	IOW; 25								
2014	Gracin Raz	99	Toyota										EVG; 6	KCR	MMP					
2014	Christian PaHud	99	Toyota													AAS; 1				
2014	Nick Drake	99	Toyota														PHO; 1**			
2015	Chris Eggleston	99	Toyota	KCR; 5	IRW; 1*	TUS; 9	IOW; 15	SHA; 1	SON; 13	SLS; 11	IOW; 16	EVG; 3	CNS; 3	MER; 4	AAS; 3	PHO; 11			1st	511
2017	Chris Eggleston	99	Toyota	TUS; 1*	KCR; 4	IRW; 2	IRW; 2	SPO; 3	OSS; 1*	CNS; 1	SON; 10	IOW; 3	EVG; 1**	DCS; 2*	MER; 7	AAS; 3	KCR; 20		2nd	581
2018	Cole Rouse	99	Toyota	KCR; 3	TUS; 7	TUS; 4	OSS; 3	CNS; 6	SON; 12	DCS; 6	IOW; 8	EVG; 2	GTW; 2	LVS; 6	MER; 2	AAS; 1	KCR; 7		3rd	557
2019	Brittney Zamora	99	Toyota	LVS; 11	IRW; 8	TUS; 5	TUS; 3	CNS; 4	SON; 29	DCS; 5	IOW; 20	EVG; 3	GTW; 16	MER; 8	AAS; 6	KCR; 4	PHO; 6		5th	490
2020	Gracie Trotter	99	Toyota	LVS; 4	MMP; 7	MMP; 7	IRW; 3	EVG; 5	DCS; 2	CNS; 4	LVS; 1*	AAS; 10	KCR; 5	PHO; 9					3rd	582
2021	Cole Moore	99	Toyota	PHO; 12	SON; 4	IRW; 5	CNS; 4	IRW; 6	PIR; 12	LVS; 6	AAS; 5	PHO; 10							3rd	436
2022	Cole Moore	99	Chevy	PHO; 11	IRW; 2	KCR; 3			IRW; 2	EVG; 4		AAS; 1	LVS; 14	PHO; 14					3rd	563
2022	Cole Moore	99	Toyota				PIR; 11	SON; 12			PIR; 4								3rd	563
2023	Caleb Shrader	99	Chevy	PHO	IRW	KCR	PIR; 7	SON	IRW	SHA	EVG	AAS	LVS	MAD	PHO					
