= Robert Tartaglia =

American racing driver (born 1959)

- Born: April 19, 1959 (age 67); Reedley, California

NASCAR Cup Series career
- 2 races run over 2 years
- Best finish: 104th (1981)
- First race: 1979 NAPA Riverside 400 (Riverside)
- Last race: 1981 Winston Western 500 (Riverside)
Wins	Top tens	Poles
0	0	0

ARCA Menards Series West career
- 31 races run over 4 years
- Best finish: 7th (1979)
- First race: 1978 Winston Stockton 100 (Stockton)
- Last race: 1981 Sears Point Winston 200 (Sonoma)
Wins	Top tens	Poles
0	8	0
- Statistics up to date as of May 15, 2026.

Robert Tartaglia (born April 19, 1959) is an American former professional stock car racing driver who competed in the NASCAR Winston West Series from 1978 to 1981.

== Racing career ==
Tartaglia debuted in the NASCAR Winston West Series in 1978, driving for Harry Goularte at Stockton 99 Speedway, where he crashed out after just seven laps; in three further starts, he scored a best finish of eleventh at Orange Show Speedway.

Tartaglia would run a majority of the schedule in 1979, driving the No. 57 for Don Guy Racing. In thirteen races, he scored three top-tens, including a fifth-place finish in his final start of the year at Ascot Park. He ended the season seventh in the standings. In running a majority of the West Series schedule, Tartaglia made his NASCAR Winston Cup Series debut at Riverside International Raceway in the NAPA Riverside 400 after failing to qualify for the season opener at the track; he would finish 24th after a crash took him out of the event after 47 laps.

In 1980, Tartaglia competed in eight races, again scoring three top-tens. He finished eighth in the standings.

Tartaglia's final year of NASCAR competition came in 1981, where he competed in six West Series races, scoring two top-ten results. This schedule included his second and final Winston Cup start, where he finished 35th at Riverside after valve issues took him out of the race after just four laps.

Following his NASCAR career, Tartaglia began competing in the USAC Supermodified Series in 1985. While he failed to finish his first two starts, he would score a fifth place finish at the Spokane Super Oval. He competed in two races at Chaparral Speedway in 1986, finishing ninth and eleventh. Tartaglia expanded his schedule to fourteen races in 1987, scoring twelve top-tens, including four third-place finishes. His final season in the series came in 1988, where he competed in twelve of thirteen races, finishing top-ten in all of them and finishing third in the standings. From 1989 to 1992, Tartaglia competed in the Copper World Classic at Phoenix Raceway, scoring two top-tens.

== Motorsports career results ==
=== NASCAR ===
(key) (Bold – Pole position awarded by qualifying time. Italics – Pole position earned by points standings or practice time. * – Most laps led.)

==== Winston Cup Series ====
NASCAR Winston Cup Series results
Year	Team	No.	Make	1	2	3	4	5	6	7	8	9	10	11	12	13	14	15	16	17	18	19	20	21	22	23	24	25	26	27	28	29	30	31	NWCSC	Pts	Ref
1979	Don Guy Racing	57	Chevy	RSD; DNQ	DAY	CAR	RCH	ATL	NWS	BRI	DAR	MAR	TAL	NSV	DOV	CLT	TWS	RSD; 24	MCH	DAY	NSV	POC	TAL	MCH	BRI	DAR	RCH	DOV	MAR	CLT	NWS	CAR	ATL	ONT	107th	91	
1981	Tartaglia Racing	2W	Chevy	RSD; 35	DAY	RCH	CAR	ATL	BRI	NWS	DAR	MAR	TAL	NSV	DOV	CLT	TWS	RSD	MCH	DAY	NSV	POC	TAL	MCH	BRI	DAR	RCH	DOV	MAR	NWS	CLT	CAR	ATL	RSD	104th	58	

==== Winston West Series ====
NASCAR Winston West Series results
Year	Team	No.	Make	1	2	3	4	5	6	7	8	9	10	11	12	13	14	15	16	17	18	19	20	21	22	NWWSC	Pts	Ref
1978	Goularte Racing	17x	Chevy	RSD	AAS	S99	SHA; 21	PET; 20	MMR	RSD	IFS	YAK	WSP	LSP	EVG	POR	CRS	ASP								N/A	66	
1978	Don Guy Racing	77	Chevy																SON; 25	SHA	CBS	YAK				N/A	66	
1978	Don Guy Racing	57	Chevy																				OSS; 11	ONT	PHO	N/A	66	
1979	Don Guy Racing	57	Chevy	RSD; DNQ	MMR; 17	RSD; 24	EVG; 13	YAK; 16	POR; 12	AAS; 12	SHA; 13	CRS; 12	SON; 9	EVG; 23	SPO; 10	POR; 15	ASP; 5	ONT	PHO							7th	498	
1980	Don Guy Racing	2	Pontiac	RSD	ONT; 8	S99; 17	RSD	LAG; 10	EVG; 13	POR; 13	SON; 8	MMR; 11	ONT	PHO; 22												8th	373	
1981	Tartaglia Racing	2W	Chevy	RSD; 35																						17th	163	
1981	Don Guy Racing	2	Pontiac		S99; 9	AAS; 8	MMR; 12	RSD	LAG; Wth																	17th	163	
1981	Don Guy Racing	57	Chevy						LAG; 14	POR	WSP	EVG	SHA	RSD	SON; 15	RSD	PHO									17th	163	
