= Jack Jeffery (racing driver) =

American racing driver (1938–2005)

- Born: Jack Melvin Jeffery; February 6, 1938; Spokane, Washington, U.S.
- Died: April 9, 2005 (aged 67); Moxee, Washington, U.S.

ARCA Menards Series West career
- 37 races run over 8 years
- Best finish: 14th (1978)
- First race: 1967 Race 17 (Evergreen)
- Last race: 1981 G.I. Joe's Portland 150 (Portland)
- First win: 1978 Winston Coos Bay 100 (Coos Bay)
Wins	Top tens	Poles
1	20	2
- Statistics up to date as of October 7, 2026.

Jack Melvin Jeffery (February 6, 1938 – April 9, 2005) was an American professional stock car racing driver. He competed in the NASCAR Winston West Series from 1967 to 1981.

== Racing career ==
Jeffery made his NASCAR Pacific Coast Late Model Division debut at Evergreen Speedway in 1967, finishing sixteenth of eighteen cars. He made two starts in 1968, finishing sixteenth at Yakima Speedway and Evergreen. Jeffery won the Apple Cup in 1968 and 1971. He returned to the renamed Winston West Series in 1972, running eleven races and scoring seven top-tens with a best finish of second at Langley Speedway. Jeffery ran five races in 1973, scoring two top-tens with a best finish of fifth at Evergreen. He next competed in the series in 1978, running eleven races and scoring two poles, eight top-tens, and his first and only career win at Coos Bay Speedway. Jeffery ran five Winston West races in 1979, scoring two top-tens, both sixth-place finishes coming at Evergreen and Portland Speedway. He made a start at Evergreen in 1980, finishing fifteenth due to engine issues. Jeffery made his final start at Portland in 1981, finishing eighth. He finished fourth in the NASCAR Winston Northwest Racing Series standings in 1982.

== Motorsports career results ==
=== NASCAR ===
(key) (Bold – Pole position awarded by qualifying time. Italics – Pole position earned by points standings or practice time. * – Most laps led.)

==== Winston West Series ====
NASCAR Winston West Series results
Year	Team	No.	Make	1	2	3	4	5	6	7	8	9	10	11	12	13	14	15	16	17	18	19	20	21	22	23	24	25	26	27	28	29	30	NWWSC	Pts	Ref
1967	Jack Jeffery	22	Dodge	AMP	SGV	RSD	CPS	SHA	SAL	POR	ASP	SGV	OSS	ASP	ACF	RVR	SAL	JBA	YAK	EVG; 16	ASP	CSP												NA	NA	
1968	Jack Jeffery	22	Dodge	RSD	ASP	KEA	VAL	ASP	AMP	DCS	POR	EVG	EUG	MED	OSS	TCR	YAK; 16	EVG; 16	EUR	BKS	S99	CSP	SGS											NA	NA	
1972	Unknown	22	Dodge	RSD	ONT	SJS	S99	SMN	TCR; 4	YAK; 22	EVG; 8	RSD	MED	POR; 7	IFS; 3	MER	SPS; 7	LSP; 2	WSP; 16	SKA; 12	RAS	CRS	OSS	SGS	CSP	BKS	EVG; 23	USP; 7	YAK	POR	ASP	WCR	SMN	20th	759.5	
1973	Jefferies Racing	22	Dodge	AMP	MAD	S99	AUR	KFS	CBS	USP; 14	POR; 18	SPS	WER	SGS	CAJ	OSS	CSP	BKS	LAG	EVG; 5	WSP	YAK; 14	POR; 8	AMP										24th	359	
1978	Dick Bowman	14	Pontiac	RSD	AAS	S99	SHA	PET	MMR	RSD	IFS; 4	YAK; 6	WSP; 5							**SHA**; 4*	**CBS**; 1*	YAK; 8	OSS	ONT	PHO									14th	482	
1978	Dick Bowman	4	Pontiac											LSP; 18																				14th	482	
1978	Dick Bowman	4	Chevy												EVG; 6	POR; 8																		14th	482	
1978	Dick Bowman	4	Olds														CRS; 13	ASP; 16	SON															14th	482	
1979	Jack Jeffery	07	Pontiac	RSD	MMR	RSD	EVG	YAK; 21	POR	AAS	SHA; 14	CRS	SON	EVG; 6	SPO; 17	POR; 6	ASP	ONT	PHO															19th	191	
1980	Unknown	88	Pontiac	RSD	ONT	S99	RSD	LAG	EVG; 15	POR	SON	MMR	ONT	PHO																				NA	36	
1981	Jefferies Racing	88	Buick	RSD	S99	AAS	MMR	RSD	LAG	POR; 8	WSP	EVG	SHA	RSD	SON	RSD	PHO																	39th	44	
