= 1981 NASCAR Winston West Series =

28th season of the NASCAR Winston West Series

Seasons
- ← 1980 1982 →

The 1981 NASCAR Winston West Series was the 28th season of the series. The title was won by Roy Smith, his second in the series and second in succession.

== Teams and drivers ==
=== Full schedule ===
Manufacturer	Team	No.	Driver
Buick 13 Dodge 1	Gerald Craker	01	Hershel McGriff
Buick 13 Oldsmobile 1	Robert Beadle	11	Roy Smith
Buick 8 Pontiac 3 Oldsmobile 2 Chevrolet 1	Bown Racing	16	Jim Bown
Buick 10 Pontiac 3 Oldsmobile 1	Don Waterman	38	Don Waterman
Oldsmobile 13 Chevrolet 1	Jack Williams	78	Jim Robinson

=== Partial schedule ===
Manufacturer	Team	No.	Driver	Races
Buick	Behn's Enterprises	18	Rick O'Dell	9
Buick	DiGard Motorsports	88	Bobby Allison	1
Buick	Edgett Racing	74	Gary Kershaw	2
Buick	Gautsche Racing	82	Sumner McKnight	6
Buick	Jefferies Racing	88	Jack Jeffery	1
Buick	McKnight Racing	82	Sumner McKnight	1
Buick	Petty Enterprises	42	Kyle Petty	4
Buick	Petty Enterprises	43	Richard Petty	4
Buick	Schmitt Racing	73	Bill Schmitt	13
Buick	Thonesen Racing	07	Gene Thonesen	11
Buick	Williamson Racing	9	Jimmy Insolo	1
Chevrolet	Bob Rogers	37	Don Sprouse	1
Chevrolet	Dale Sorenson	61	Don Stanley	4
Chevrolet	Don Guy Racing	57	Robert Tartaglia	2
Chevrolet	Hamby Motorsports	17	Steve Pfeifer	1
Chevrolet	Lillian Ward	60	Glen Ward	2
Chevrolet	Mayeda Racing	65	Gary Mayeda	1
Chevrolet	Pat Mintey	35	Pat Mintey	12
Chevrolet	Sedgwick Racing	25	Bill Sedgwick	2
Chevrolet	Unknown	44	Billy Hitchcox	1
Chevrolet	Unknown	55	Al Vanderbyl	1
Dodge	Davis Racing	22	St. James Davis	3
Dodge	Palmer Racing	67	Randy Becker	3
Dodge	Unknown	80	Eddie Westwood	4
Ford	Jefferson Racing	95	Derrike Cope	4
Ford	Mark Stahl Racing	85	Mark Stahl	2
Ford	Wood Brothers Racing	21	Neil Bonnett	4
Mercury	Unknown	21	Dan Reed	2
Mercury	Unknown	21	Mike Chase	1
Mercury	Unknown	21	Davey Allison	1
Oldsmobile	Bob Bondurant	03	Bob Bondurant	1
Oldsmobile	Reg Kennedy	8	Jim Hopkinson	2
Oldsmobile	Wawak Racing	74	Henry Jones	1
Plymouth	Unknown	52	Glen Thorburn	1
Pontiac	Bishop Racing	96	Sharon Bishop	6
Pontiac	Go-En Racing	17	Harry Goularte	5
Pontiac	Harry Dinwiddie	41	Harry Dinwiddie	1
Pontiac	HFJ Racing	69	Bob Bondurant	2
Pontiac	KC Racing	91	John Krebs	2
Pontiac	Miller Racing	51	Scott Miller	3
Pontiac	Osterlund Racing	72	Dale Earnhardt	1
Pontiac	Pryor Racing	20	Pappy Pryor	2
Pontiac	Ranier-Lundy Racing	28	Bobby Allison	1
Pontiac	Rodney Friesen	52	Don Graham	5
Pontiac	Thirkettle Racing	5	Jim Thirkettle	1
Pontiac	Unknown	4	Gary Johnson	4
Pontiac	Unknown	8	Ross Kusah	1
Pontiac	Unknown	66	Steve Pfeifer	1
Pontiac	Unknown	71	Terry Forsythe	1
Pontiac	Unknown	88	Kirk Rogers	1
Pontiac	Walbridge Racing	7	Mark Walbridge	1
Buick 1 Chevrolet 1	Francis Racing	33	Glenn Francis	2
Buick 7 Pontiac 3	A. J. Kurten	1	Jimmy Insolo	5
Buick 7 Pontiac 3	A. J. Kurten	1	Rick McCray	4
Buick 7 Pontiac 3	A. J. Kurten	1	Chuck Pittenger	1
Chevrolet 1 Oldsmobile 1	Pfeifer Racing	94	Steve Pfeifer	2
Chevrolet 3 Pontiac 2	Kord Racing	94	Russ Pursley	3
Chevrolet 3 Pontiac 2	Kord Racing	94	Bob Kennedy	2
Oldsmobile 10 Chevrolet 1	Puskarich Racing	13	Don Puskarich	10
Oldsmobile 10 Chevrolet 1	Puskarich Racing	13	Larry Burton	1
Oldsmobile 3 Pontiac 3	Kieper Racing	98	Johnny Kieper	6
Pontiac 6 Buick 1	Midgley Racing	29	Terry Forsythe	7
Pontiac 2 Buick 1 Chevrolet 1	John Borneman	81	John Borneman	4
Pontiac 5 Chevrolet 2	McCray Racing	08	Rick McCray	5
Pontiac 5 Chevrolet 2	McCray Racing	08	Ken McCray Jr.	2
Pontiac 3 Chevrolet 1	Tartaglia Racing	2	Robert Tartaglia	4
Pontiac 5 Oldsmobile 3	Reg Kennedy	84	Jim Hopkinson	3
Pontiac 5 Oldsmobile 3	Reg Kennedy	84	Moe Willits	3
Pontiac 5 Oldsmobile 3	Reg Kennedy	84	Reg Kennedy	2

== Schedule and results ==
The 1981 season included 14 individual races, although Riverside International Raceway hosted four races. Three of the races at Riverside were in combination with the NASCAR Winston Cup Series.

Date	Name	Racetrack	Location	Winner
January 11	Winston Western 500	Riverside International Raceway	Riverside, California	Bobby Allison
May 16	Stockton Winston 150	Stockton 99 Speedway	Stockton, California	Jimmy Insolo
May 24	Winston Roseville 150	All American Speedway	Roseville, California	Jim Robinson
May 30	Winston Mesa Marin 150	Mesa Marin Raceway	Bakersfield, California	Roy Smith
June 14	Warner W. Hodgdon 400	Riverside International Raceway	Riverside, California	Darrell Waltrip
June 28	Coca-Cola 200	Laguna Seca Raceway	Monterey, California	Roy Smith
July 5	G.I. Joe's Portland 150	Rose City Speedway	Portland, Oregon	Jim Robinson
July 8	Juan De Fuca News 150	Western Speedway	Victoria, British Columbia	Jim Bown
July 12	Evergreen 200	Evergreen Speedway	Monroe, Washington	Roy Smith
August 8	Winston Shasta 150	Shasta Speedway	Anderson, California	Jim Robinson
August 30	Warner W. Hodgdon 200	Riverside International Raceway	Riverside, California	Roy Smith
September 27	Sears Point Winston 200	Sears Point International Raceway	Sonoma, California	Bill Schmitt
November 22	Winston Western 500	Riverside International Raceway	Riverside, California	Bobby Allison
November 29	Warner W. Hodgdon 250	Phoenix International Raceway	Avondale, Arizona	Richard Petty

== Full Drivers' Championship ==
(key) Bold – Pole position awarded by time. Italics – Pole position set by owner's points. * – Most laps led. † – Ineligible for West Series points

Pos	Driver	RSD	S99	AAS	MMR	RSD	LAG	POR	WSP	EVG	SHA	RSD	SON	RSD	PHO	Pts
1	Roy Smith	31	**13**	10	**1***	8	1*	14	5	**1***	7	1*	**3**	30	6	677
2	Jim Robinson	6	7	**1***	18	10	7	1*	**2***	3	1	17	8	32	16	658
3	Bill Schmitt	22	4	9	4	24	2	7		2	**4***	3	1	14	5	620
4	Don Waterman	10	10	4	11	23	4	12	9	13	9	13	4	15	10	615
5	Jim Bown	DNQ	18	2	3	32	3	2	1	16	2	21	6	36	14	606
6	Hershel McGriff	33	2	19	8	25	16	3	3	5	8	**16**	16	38	23	581
7	Pat Mintey		15	16	9		11	10	7	6	15	7	17	34	8	530
8	Gene Thonesen		20	18	13		9	13	10	12	10	25		22	13	495
9	Don Puskarich	32	11	20	16	17	13					22	2	21	24	394
10	Rick McCray	26	21	11	17		15			8	3	6	5			372
11	Rick O'Dell		17	5	5	16	19	18	14	14	12					366
12	Johnny Kieper							11	13	7	6		21		15	246
13	Terry Forsythe				21		10	5	8	15	11				9	243
14	Sumner McKnight						DNQ	16	6	4	14	24	23			242
15	Jimmy Insolo	30	1*	3	2	36	**20**									237
16	Derrike Cope							**6**	15	18		27				188
17	Robert Tartaglia	35	9	8	12		14						15			163
18	Harry Goularte		5	6	6		17						22			136
19	Scott Miller												19	29	7	125
20	Don Graham		8	7	20		5				5					118
21	Moe Willits							17	15	10						118
22	Randy Becker											19	10		18	114
23	Russ Pursley		16	15	14											108
24	Eddie Westwood		12	13	22		DNQ									106
25	John Borneman	12			7							2			19	92
26	Reg Kennedy											9	7			89
27	Gary Johnson		6	12								4	12*			84
28	Ken McCray Jr.										17	5				84
29	Gary Kershaw													12	17	84
30	Mark Stahl											11		23†	11	84
31	Dan Reed		3	17												83
32	John Krebs											18	11			81
33	Steve Pfeifer	24				14	18								21	76
34	Jim Hopkinson		14	14			8					15	18			74
35	Richard Petty	5†				3†								7†	1	60
36	Kyle Petty	20†				6†								37†	3	48
37	Bob Bondurant	21												18	20	47
38	Bobby Allison	1*†				29†	6							1*†	4	46
39	Jack Jeffery							8								44
40	Bill Sedgwick				10							20				40
41	Larry Burton										16					37
42	Jim Thirkettle				15											36
43	Dale Earnhardt	3†				2†		19						4†		35
44	Mike Chase				19											32
45	St. James Davis		19				12					26				32
46	Don Stanley						21					23	14		12	30
47	Chuck Pittenger														22	30
48	Gary Mayeda				23											28
49	Glenn Francis				24							12				27
	Sharon Bishop							9	11	11	13	10	20			
	Bob Kennedy											8	13			
	Glen Ward											14	9			
	Pappy Pryor							15		17						
	Neil Bonnett	27†				4†								33†	**2***	
	Billy Hitchcox								4							
	Ross Kusah							4								
	Mark Walbridge									9						
	Al Vanderbyl								12							
	Glen Thorburn									19						
	Don Sprouse	DNQ														
	Harry Dinwiddie	DNQ														
	Henry Jones	DNQ														
	Davey Allison						DNQ									
	Kirk Rogers						DNQ									

== See also ==
- 1981 NASCAR Winston Cup Series
