= Don Graham (racing driver) =

American racing driver (1943–2016)

- Born: October 5, 1943; Rio Linda, California, U.S.
- Died: May 28, 2016 (aged 72)

NASCAR Cup Series career
- 3 races run over 3 years
- Best finish: 87th (1978)
- First race: 1977 Los Angeles Times 500 (Ontario)
- Last race: 1979 Winston Western 500 (Riverside)
Wins	Top tens	Poles
0	0	0

ARCA Menards Series West career
- 55 races run over 8 years
- Best finish: 8th (1978)
- First race: 1972 San Jose 150 (San Jose)
- Last race: 1981 Winston Shasta 150 (Shasta)
Wins	Top tens	Poles
0	20	2
- Statistics up to date as of October 5, 2026.

Don Graham (October 5, 1943 – May 28, 2016) was an American professional stock car racing driver. He primarily competed in the NASCAR Winston West Series between 1972 and 1981.

== Racing career ==
Graham began competing in the NASCAR Winston West Series in 1972, scoring a top-ten at Sierra Mesa National Speedway. He failed to qualify for a combination race with the NASCAR Winston Cup Series at Ontario Motor Speedway. Graham made five Winston West starts in 1973, scoring a pole at Century 21 Speedway and three top-tens. He did not compete again until 1976, finishing twelfth at Laguna Seca Raceway and failed to qualify for the combination race at Ontario. He attempted the Rose Classic at All American Speedway, failing to qualify; he later returned to the race in 1994, where he'd win. Graham made fourteen Winston West starts in 1977, scoring three top-tens. He finished tenth in the standings. He failed to qualify for the Winston Cup season opener at Riverside but would make his Winston Cup debut in the combination race at Ontario, finishing 30th due to engine issues. Graham ran 20 of 22 Winston West races in 1978, scoring a pole at Craig Road Speedway and eight top-tens. He finished a career-best eighth in the final standings. He finished 22nd due to a wheel bearing issue in the second Riverside combination race and failed to qualify for the combination race at Ontario. Graham only made one start in 1979, finishing 22nd in the season-opening Riverside combination race due to engine issues. Graham made four Winston West starts in 1980, scoring a top-ten at Sears Point International Raceway. He made his final five starts in the series in 1981, scoring four top-tens, including finishing fifth in his final two starts. Graham ran the Copper World Classic at Phoenix International Raceway in 1987 and 1993, finishing third in the former race. He made two NASCAR Featherlite Southwest Tour starts in 1992, scoring a best finish of nineteenth at Redwood Acres Speedway. He attempted three races in 1993, failing to qualify at Sears Point International Raceway and scoring a top-ten at Mesa Marin Raceway. Graham made at least one Shell Tri-Track Challenge start in 1998. He made at least two Tri-State Challenge Series starts in 1999, scoring a top-ten at Shasta Speedway. In 2000, he ran two Shell Tri-Track Challenge races at Altamont Motorsports Park, finishing last in his first start and second in his scond start. He ran two Tri-State Challenge Series races, scoring a best finish of thirteenth at Redwood Acres.

== Motorsports career results ==
=== NASCAR ===
(key) (Bold – Pole position awarded by qualifying time. Italics – Pole position earned by points standings or practice time. * – Most laps led.)

==== Winston Cup Series ====
NASCAR Winston Cup Series results
Year	Team	No.	Make	1	2	3	4	5	6	7	8	9	10	11	12	13	14	15	16	17	18	19	20	21	22	23	24	25	26	27	28	29	30	31	NWCSC	Pts	Ref
1972	Don Guy Racing	57W	Chevy	RSD	DAY	RCH	ONT; DNQ	CAR	ATL	BRI	DAR	NWS	MAR	TAL	CLT	DOV	MCH	RSD	TWS	DAY	BRI	TRN	ATL	TAL	MCH	NSV	DAR	RCH	DOV	MAR	NWS	CLT	CAR	TWS	NA	0	
1976	Bob Lehman	52	Chevy	RSD	DAY	CAR	RCH	BRI	ATL	NWS	DAR	MAR	TAL	NSV	DOV	CLT	RSD	MCH	DAY	NSV	POC	TAL	MCH	BRI	DAR	RCH	DOV	MAR	NWS	CLT	CAR	ATL	ONT; DNQ		152nd	0	
1977	Bob Lehman	52	Chevy	RSD; DNQ	DAY	RCH	CAR	ATL	NWS	DAR	BRI	MAR	TAL	NSV	DOV	CLT	RSD	MCH	DAY	NSV	POC	TAL	MCH	BRI	DAR	RCH	DOV	MAR	NWS	CLT	CAR	ATL	ONT; 30		102nd	73	
1978	Rodney Friesen	52	Chevy	RSD	DAY	RCH	CAR	ATL	BRI	DAR	NWS	MAR	TAL	DOV	CLT	NSV	RSD; 22	MCH	DAY	NSV	POC	TAL	MCH	BRI	DAR	RCH	DOV	MAR	NWS	CLT	CAR	ATL	ONT; DNQ		88th	97	
1979	Rodney Friesen	52	Chevy	RSD; 22	DAY	CAR	RCH	ATL	NWS	BRI	DAR	MAR	TAL	NSV	DOV	CLT	TWS	RSD	MCH	DAY	NSV	POC	TAL	MCH	BRI	DAR	RCH	DOV	MAR	CLT	NWS	CAR	ATL	ONT	102nd	97	

==== Winston West Series ====
NASCAR Winston West Series results
Year	Team	No.	Make	1	2	3	4	5	6	7	8	9	10	11	12	13	14	15	16	17	18	19	20	21	22	23	24	25	26	27	28	29	30	NWWSC	Pts	Ref
1972	Don Guy Racing	57W	Chevy	RSD	ONT; DNQ																												SMN; 10	31st	356	
1972	Don Guy Racing	57	Chevy			SJS; 14	S99	SMN	TCR	YAK	EVG	RSD	MED	POR	IFS	MER	SPS	LSP	WSP	SKA	RAS	CRS	OSS	SGS	CSP; 16	BKS	EVG	USP	YAK	POR	ASP; 12	WCR; 14		31st	356	
1973	Graham Racing	57	Chevy	AMP; 15	MAD; 13	S99; 10	**AUR**; 10	KFS	CBS	USP	POR	SPS	WER	SGS	CAJ	OSS	CSP	BKS	LAG	EVG	WSP	YAK	POR											27th	325.75	
1973	Graham Racing	34	Chevy																					AMP; 9										27th	325.75	
1976	Bob Lehman	5	Chevy	RSD	RSD	EVG	WSP	USP	POR	SHA	SGS	EVG	YAK	POR	LAG; 12																			NA	77.25	
1976	Bob Lehman	52	Chevy													ONT; DNQ																		NA	77.25	
1977	Bob Lehman	52	Chevy	RSD	LAG; 10	ONT; 30	SJS	MMR; 16	ASP; 19	RSD	SGS; 19	YAK; 22	EVG	WSP; 11	USP; 13	POR	AAS; 11	CRS; 6	ASP	SHA; 6	POR; 16	ONT; 30	PHO; 16											10th	794.25	
1978	Rodney Friesen	52	Buick	RSD	AAS; 19	S99; 23	SHA; 9	PET; 5	MMR; 6		IFS; 7	YAK; 11	WSP; 7	LSP; 10	EVG; 13	POR; 15	**CRS**; 17	ASP; 11	SON; 12	SHA; 6	CBS; 17	YAK; 15	OSS; 6		PHO; 18									8th	811	
1978	Rodney Friesen	52	Chevy							RSD; 22														ONT; DNQ										8th	811	
1979	Rodney Friesen	52	Chevy	RSD; 22	MMR	RSD	EVG	YAK	POR	AAS	SHA	CRS	SON	EVG	SPO	POR	ASP	ONT	PHO															NA	46	
1980	Kord Racing	94	Chevy	RSD	ONT; 30																													22nd	130	
1980	Rodney Friesen	52	Buick			S99; 15	RSD																											22nd	130	
1980	Rodney Friesen	52	Pontiac					LAG; 20	EVG	POR	SON; 9	MMR	ONT	PHO																				22nd	130	
1981	Rodney Friesen	52	Pontiac	RSD	S99; 8	AAS; 7	MMR; 20	RSD	LAG; 5	POR	WSP	EVG	SHA; 5	RSD	SON	RSD	PHO																	20th	118	
