= 1978 NASCAR Winston West Series =

25th season of the NASCAR Winston West Series

Seasons
- ← 1977 1979 →

The 1978 NASCAR Winston West Series was the 25th season of the series. The title was won by Jimmy Insolo, his first in the series.

== Schedule and results ==
The 1978 season included 22 individual races, although Riverside International Raceway, Shasta Speedway, and Yakima Speedway hosted two races each. The races at Riverside and the race at Ontario were in combination with the NASCAR Winston Cup Series.

Date	Name	Racetrack	Location	Winner
January 22	Winston Western 500	Riverside International Raceway	Riverside, California	Cale Yarborough
April 2	Winston Roseville 100	All American Speedway	Roseville, California	Jimmy Insolo
April 28	Winston Stockton 100	Stockton 99 Speedway	Stockton, California	Tim Williamson
April 30	Old Milwaukee 100	Shasta Speedway	Anderson, California	Jimmy Insolo
May 13	Winston Petaluma 100	Petaluma Speedway	Petaluma, California	Ray Elder
May 28	Winston Mesa Marin 100	Mesa Marin Raceway	Bakersfield, California	Jimmy Insolo
June 11	NAPA 400	Riverside International Raceway	Riverside, California	Benny Parsons
June 22	Winston Spokane 100	Interstate Fairgrounds Speedway	Spokane, Washington	Gary Johnson
June 24	Winston Yakima 100	Yakima Speedway	Yakima, Washington	Jimmy Insolo
June 28	Winston Victoria 100	Western Speedway	Victoria, British Columbia	Jimmy Insolo
June 30	Winston Langley 100	Langley Speedway	Langley, British Columbia	Ron Eaton
July 3	Winston Evergreen 100	Evergreen Speedway	Monroe, Washington	John Borneman
July 4	Coca Cola 100	Portland Speedway	Portland, Oregon	Bill Schmitt
August 5	Winston Las Vegas 100	Craig Road Speedway	North Las Vegas, Nevada	Ray Elder
August 6	Winston Gardena 100	Ascot Park	Gardena, California	John Krebs
August 13	Winston Sears Point 100	Sears Point International Raceway	Sonoma, California	Jimmy Insolo
August 26	Winston Shasta 150	Shasta Speedway	Anderson, California	Jimmy Insolo
August 27	Winston Coos Bay 100	Coos Bay Speedway	Coos Bay, Oregon	Jack Jeffrey
September 2	Yakima Winston 100	Yakima Speedway	Yakima, Washington	Jimmy Insolo
September 23	Midland Motor Home 100	Orange Show Speedway	San Bernardino, California	Jimmy Insolo
November 19	Los Angeles Times 500	Ontario Motor Speedway	Ontario, California	Bobby Allison
November 26	Arizona NAPA 250	Phoenix International Raceway	Avondale, Arizona	Richard Petty

== Full Drivers' Championship ==
(key) Bold – Pole position awarded by time. Italics – Pole position set by owner's points. * – Most laps led. † – Ineligible for West Series points

Pos	Driver	RSD	AAS	S99	SHA	PET	MMR	RSD	IFS	YAK	WSP	LSP	EVG	POR	CRS	ASP	SON	SHA	CBS	YAK	OSS	ONT	PHO	Pts
1	Jimmy Insolo	7	1*	22	1*	18	1*	32	17	**1**	1	**3**	**3**	6	18	17	1*	1	16	1*	1*	7	2	1065
2	Bill Schmitt	32	5	11	**2**	**6**	**3**	8	2	4	15	2	4*	1*	6	3*	5	2	2	20	2	14	5	1014
3	Richard White	24	11	5	4	3	5	19	6	7	17	11	12	7	2	2	9	14	5	6	10	18	12	954
4	Ray Elder	34	7	7	21	1*	2	6	3	12*	6	8	9	5	1	18	18	12	6	13	5	40	7	953
5	Harry Goularte	DNQ	16	8	6	8	7	20	12	2	18	4	7	4	12	12	3	16	7	5	8	33	6	922
6	John Borneman	27	**12**	9	5	19	15	23	9	10	16	9	1	3	10	6	21	7	18	3	7	25	24	903
7	Rick McCray	12	15	16	15	4	8	13	14	18	20	14	10	24	9	9	20	15	4	12	14	39	27	835
8	Don Graham		19	23	9	5	6	22	7	11	7	10	14	15	**17***	11	12	6	17	15	6	DNQ	18	811
9	Pat Mintey		14	18	13	7	11		20	19	9	12	11	10	7	4	4	11	9	18	4		15	753
10	John Krebs		9	14	11	14	16		15	22	10	19	17	14	16	1	13	10	8	16	3	DNQ	20	751
11	Gary Johnson	35	3	6	3	11	18		**1***	5	19		20	20			2	8		11	9		8	696
12	Steve Pfeifer	DNQ		15	14	13	12		11	14	21	17	16	18	5	14	11	21	13	19	12	32		693
13	Bill Baker	DNQ	6	17	16	9	13	34	10	15	11	15	18	16	8	8	DNQ							565
14	Jack Jeffery								4	6	5	18	6	8	13	16		**4***	**1***	8				482
15	Frank Bigelow		2	2	8	16	19								3	15		5	14					375
16	Ernie Stierly	19	4	20	18	15		31			**4***	7		9				13				DNQ	11	336
17	Dick Whalen	DNQ	18	12	10	12											22					DNQ	14	302
18	Roy Smith	9									2	16	5	13								DNQ	9	283
19	George Stuart								5	8			2											271
20	Ron Gautsche		13	19	7	2	17									**5**								243
21	Ron McGee	DNQ	10	10	25	17											23					DNQ		242
22	Chris Monoleos						9		19	16	13		23				19					DNQ	DNQ	207
23	Don Waterman				12					9	8	5		**21**										200
24	Jim Thirkettle	17					4	9														10		189
25	Ron Eaton									3		1*	24							2				184
26	Ed Rains								16	21				17				20	10					171
27	Pappy Pryor	DNQ							18	13	22								11	22			DNQ	169
28	John Soares Jr.		17			20							19	11										167
29	St. James Davis														15	20	26	22	19		20		DNQ	159
30	Sharon Bishop									17	12		22					18	15	21				132
31	Art Roth													2	14			9	3					127
32	Tim Williamson			**1***	17		20										**6**						10	117
33	LeRoy Anderson											20	13							9				111
34	Norm Palmer	14						35														DNQ		179
35	Johnny Steele		8	13	24																			108
	Don Puskarich	31					DNQ										16					DNQ		105
	Duke Hoenshell						10								19								21	103
	Neal Newberry								8				21							**7**				87
	Mike Chase			4	19																			79
	Mel Larson																					29	26	76
	Robert Tartaglia		21	20												25				11				66
	Jim Robinson														11						**13**		25	64
	Harry Jefferson									23										17				62
	Johnny Kieper				26						14											DNQ		62
	Richard Petty	16†						2†														34†	**1***	62
	Bob Fox											13								4				47
	Neil Bonnett	4†						10†														37†	4	47
	Gary Matthews																7							44
	Merle Brennan																8							43
	Ross Kusah													12						10		DNQ		41
	J. C. Danielsen					10																		41
	Hal Callentine																	23				DNQ	13	38
	Stuart Lyndon															13								38
	Frank Swords																	3	12	14				37
	Ken McCray Jr.																				15			36
	Earle Canavan																					DNQ	16	35
	Alan Brown														4	7					17			34
	Rusty Sanders																						17	34
	Jim Bown												25	19									19	32
	Ivan Baldwin																				19			32
	David Pearson	**3**†						**27**†									17					38†	22	29
	Jim Walker				23													19						28
	Ronnie Thomas	DNQ						25†														30†	23	28
	Jeff Barnicle																24							27
	Marc Vogel						21																29	22
	Rick O'Dell									20	3	6	8	22										
	Bobby Allison	30†		3	22			3†									10					1*†	3	
	Hank Millwee															10								
	Steve Rouse								13															
	Benny Parsons	2†						1†									14					8†		
	Hugh Pearson						14																	
	Leonard Sundholm												15											
	Hershel McGriff	6†						17†									15							
	Dean Huss Jr.																				16			
	Don Dupree																	17						
	Jim Miller Jr.																				18			
	Steve Reich															19								
	Bill Marchison		20																					
	Jack Simpson	22																				DNQ		
	Doug McGriff													23										
	Wally Lambert																						28	
	Don Noel																					28		
	Billy Clarkson																						30	
	Eddie Bradshaw	33																						
	Dick Kranzler	DNQ																				DNQ		
	John Kennedy	DNQ																						
	John Soares	DNQ																						
	Ed Negre	DNQ																				21†		
	Evan Noyes Jr.	DNQ																						
	Bennie Vaught	DNQ																						
	Roger Hamby	DNQ																				12†		
	John Dineen	DNQ																						
	Glenn Francis	DNQ																						
	Chuck Wahl	DNQ																						
	Mike Brockman	DNQ																						
	Bob Switzer	DNQ																						
	Lennie Pond	DNQ						7†														6†		
	Jocko Maggiacomo	DNQ																						
	Mike Kempton	DNQ																						
	Bob Brown	DNQ																						
	Roland Wlodyka	DNQ																						
	Duke Miller						DNQ																	
	Bruce Hill																					DNQ		
	Mike Roche																					DNQ		
	Ed Hale																					DNQ		
	Ricky Rudd																					DNQ		
	Tighe Scott	18†						11†														DNQ		
	Dave Watson																					DNQ		
	D. K. Ulrich	10†						14†														DNQ		
	Baxter Price																					DNQ		
	Bobby Wawak																					DNQ		
	Billy Hagan																					DNQ		
	Benny Vaught																					DNQ		
	Raymond Williams																						DNQ	
	Ray Cline																						DNQ	

== See also ==
- 1978 NASCAR Winston Cup Series
