= Harry Goularte =

American racing driver (born 1956)

- Born: July 29, 1956 (age 70); Morgan Hill, California, U.S.

NASCAR Cup Series career
- 8 races run over 5 years
- Best finish: 61st (1984)
- First race: 1977 NAPA 400 (Riverside)
- Last race: 1987 Winston Western 500 (Riverside)
Wins	Top tens	Poles
0	0	0

ARCA Menards Series West career
- 80 races run over 13 years
- Best finish: 5th (1978)
- First race: 1976 Winston Monterey 100 (Laguna Seca)
- Last race: 1988 American National Bank 200 (Mesa Marin)
Wins	Top tens	Poles
0	34	1
- Statistics up to date as of October 1, 2026.

Harry Goularte (born July 29, 1956) is an American former professional stock car racing driver. He primarily competed in the NASCAR Winston West Series between 1976 and 1988.

== Racing career ==
Goularte made his NASCAR Winston West Series debut in 1976 at Laguna Seca, finishing seventeenth. He ran eleven races in 1977, only finishing one race. This race was his NASCAR Winston Cup Series debut, a combination race at Riverside International Raceway, where he finished 21st; he failed to qualify for the combination race at Ontario Motor Speedway. Goularte competed full-time in the Winston West Series in 1978, qualifying for 21 of 22 races and scoring thirteen top-tens, with a best finish of second at Yakima Speedway. He finished fifth in the standings. He failed to qualify for the first Riverside combination race, finished 20th in the second, and finished 33rd in the Ontario combination race. Goularte only ran two Winston West races in 1979, finishing 23rd in the combination race at Riverside and winning his first and only pole at Shasta Speedway, where he finished sixth. Goularte made four Winston West starts in 1980, scoring a best finish of third at Sears Point International Raceway. He attempted the Winston Cup finale at Ontario, failing to qualify. Goularte made five Winston West starts in 1981, scoring three top-tens. He made three starts in 1982, scoring a best finish of fifteenth twice. In five starts in 1983, Goularte scored three top-tens. He attempted the Winston Cup finale at Riverside, failing to qualify. Goularte ran full-time in the Winston West Series in 1984, scoring four top-tens in eleven races. He finished 22nd and 31st in the combination races at Riverside. Goularte made just one Winston West start in 1985, finishing sixth at Sears Point. He made two starts in 1986, scoring a top-ten at Portland International Raceway. He failed to qualify for a combination race at Riverside. Goularte ran his final full-time Winston West season in 1987, scoring three top-tens in the season's eight races. He finished 20th and 32nd in the combination races at Riverside, his final Winston Cup races. Goularte ran his final Winston West races in 1988, scoring two top-tens, including a third-place finish at Mesa Marin Raceway, where he'd make his final start later in the season. He competed in the Goodyear NASCAR 500 at the Calder Park Thunderdome in Australia, finished 23rd after being involved in an accident.

== Motorsports career results ==
=== NASCAR ===
(key) (Bold – Pole position awarded by qualifying time. Italics – Pole position earned by points standings or practice time. * – Most laps led.)

==== Winston Cup Series ====
NASCAR Winston Cup Series results
Year	Team	No.	Make	1	2	3	4	5	6	7	8	9	10	11	12	13	14	15	16	17	18	19	20	21	22	23	24	25	26	27	28	29	30	31	NWCSC	Pts	Ref
1977	Dean Enterprises	17	Chevy	RSD	DAY	RCH	CAR	ATL	NWS	DAR	BRI	MAR	TAL	NSV	DOV	CLT	RSD; 21	MCH	DAY	NSV	POC	TAL	MCH	BRI	DAR	RCH	DOV	MAR	NWS	CLT	CAR	ATL	ONT; DNQ		91st	100	
1978	Goularte Racing	17	Chevy	RSD; DNQ	DAY	RCH	CAR	ATL	BRI	DAR	NWS	MAR	TAL	DOV	CLT	NSV	RSD; 20	MCH	DAY	NSV	POC	TAL	MCH	BRI	DAR	RCH	DOV	MAR	NWS	CLT	CAR	ATL			77th	167	
1978	Goularte Racing	7	Chevy																														ONT; 33		77th	167	
1979	Goularte Racing	17	Chevy	RSD; 23	DAY	CAR	RCH	ATL	NWS	BRI	DAR	MAR	TAL	NSV	DOV	CLT	TWS	RSD	MCH	DAY	NSV	POC	TAL	MCH	BRI	DAR	RCH	DOV	MAR	CLT	NWS	CAR	ATL	ONT	106th	94	
1980	Go-En Racing	17	Unknown	RSD	DAY	RCH	CAR	ATL	BRI	DAR	NWS	MAR	TAL	NSV	DOV	CLT	TWS	RSD	MCH	DAY	NSV	POC	TAL	MCH	BRI	DAR	RCH	DOV	NWS	MAR	CLT	CAR	ATL	ONT; DNQ	140th	0	
1983	Goularte Racing	17	Buick	DAY	RCH	CAR	ATL	DAR	NWS	MAR	TAL	NSV	DOV	BRI	CLT	RSD	POC	MCH	DAY	NSV	POC	TAL	MCH	BRI	DAR	RCH	DOV	MAR	NWS	CLT	CAR	ATL	RSD; DNQ		136th	0	
1984	Go-En Racing	1	Buick	DAY	RCH	CAR	ATL	BRI	NWS	DAR	MAR	TAL	NSV	DOV	CLT	RSD; 22	POC	MCH	DAY	NSV	POC	TAL	MCH	BRI	DAR	RCH	DOV	MAR	CLT	NWS	CAR	ATL			61st	167	
1984	Go-En Racing	14	Buick																														RSD; 31		61st	167	
1986	Goularte Racing	14	Buick	DAY	RCH	CAR	ATL	BRI	DAR	NWS	MAR	TAL	DOV	CLT	RSD	POC	MCH	DAY	POC	TAL	GLN	MCH	BRI	DAR	RCH	DOV	MAR	NWS	CLT	CAR	ATL	RSD; DNQ			143rd	0	
1987	Whalen-Goularte Racing	14	Chevy	DAY	CAR	RCH	ATL	DAR	NWS	BRI	MAR	TAL	CLT	DOV	POC	RSD; 20	MCH	DAY	POC	TAL	GLN	MCH	BRI	DAR	RCH	DOV	MAR	NWS	CLT	CAR	RSD; 32	ATL			66th	170	

==== Winston West Series ====
NASCAR Winston West Series results
Year	Team	No.	Make	1	2	3	4	5	6	7	8	9	10	11	12	13	14	15	16	17	18	19	20	21	22	NWWSC	Pts	Ref
1976	Dean Enterprises	86	Chevy	RSD	RSD	EVG	WSP	USP	POR	SHA	SGS	EVG	YAK	POR	LAG; 17	ONT										NA	62.5	
1977	Dean Enterprises	17	Chevy	RSD	LAG; 22	ONT; 24	SJS; 17	MMR	ASP	RSD; 21	SGS	YAK	EVG; 23	WSP; 13	USP; 19	POR; 26	AAS; 12	CRS; 15	ASP	SHA	POR	ONT; DNQ	PHO; 22			16th	547	
1978	Goularte Racing	17	Chevy	RSD; DNQ	AAS; 16	S99; 8	SHA; 6	PET; 8		RSD; 20	IFS; 12	YAK; 2	WSP; 18		EVG; 7	POR; 4	CRS; 12	ASP; 12		SHA; 16	CBS; 7					5th	922	
1978	Goularte Racing	17	Pontiac						MMR; 7					LSP; 4					SON; 3			YAK; 5	OSS; 8		PHO; 6	5th	922	
1978	Goularte Racing	7	Chevy																					ONT; 33		5th	922	
1979	Goularte Racing	17	Chevy	RSD; 23	MMR	RSD	EVG	YAK	POR	AAS																NA	90	
1979	Goularte Racing	17	Pontiac								**SHA**; 6	CRS	SON	EVG	SPO	POR	ASP	ONT	PHO							NA	90	
1980	Goularte Racing	17	Chevy	RSD	ONT; 9	S99	RSD	LAG; 14	EVG	POR																16th	199	
1980	Go-En Racing	17	Pontiac								SON; 3	MMR	ONT													16th	199	
1980	Go-En Racing	17	Chevy											PHO; 14												16th	199	
1981	Go-En Racing	17	Pontiac	RSD	S99; 5	AAS; 6	MMR; 6	RSD	LAG; 17	POR	WSP	EVG	SHA	RSD	SON; 22	RSD	PHO									18th	136	
1982	Go-En Racing	17	Buick	MMR	S99	AAS	RSD	POR	WSP	SHA	EVG	SON; 15	CDR	RSD; 15	RSD	PHO; 29										27th	94	
1983	Whalen-Goularte Racing	17	Buick	S99; 14	SON; 20	RSD	YAK	EVG																		14th	281	
1983	Goularte Racing	17	Buick						SHA; 10																	14th	281	
1983	Go-En Racing	17	Buick							RSD; 6	CPL; 3	RSD	PHO; 3													14th	281	
1984	Go-En Racing	1	Buick	RSD; 22																						8th	455	
1984	Goularte Racing	17	Buick		YAK; 14	SIR; 7	POR; 10	EVG; 12	SHA; 5	WSR; 11	SON; 12	MMR; 19														8th	455	
1984	Go-En Racing	14	Buick										RSD; 31													8th	455	
1984	Goularte Racing	94	Chevy											PHO; 4												8th	455	
1985	Goularte Racing	17	Buick	SON; 6	SHA	RSD	MMR	SIR	POR	STA	YAK	EVG	WSR	MMR	RSD											37th	45	
1986	Goularte Racing	17	Buick	SON; 19	RSD	EVG	RCS	TAC	PIR; 8	WSR																26th	107	
1986	Goularte Racing	14	Buick								RSD; DNQ															26th	107	
1987	Whalen-Goularte Racing	17	Chevy	SON; 7		SGP; 15	EVG; 10	POR; 17	TAC; 8	MMR; 12																7th	330	
1987	Whalen-Goularte Racing	14	Chevy		RSD; 20						RSD; 32															7th	330	
1988	Whalen-Goularte Racing	17	Chevy	SON; 22	MMR; 3	RSD																				16th	188	
1988	Go-En Racing	17	Chevy				SGP; 15	POR	EVG; 7	MMR; 20	PHO															16th	188	
