= Richard White (racing driver) =

American racing driver (born 1939)

- Born: July 15, 1939 (age 87); Escondido, California, U.S.
- Awards: 1973 NASCAR Winston West Series Rookie of the Year

NASCAR Cup Series career
- 12 races run over 6 years
- Best finish: 54th (1979)
- First race: 1973 Winston Western 500 (Riverside)
- Last race: 1979 Los Angeles Times 500 (Ontario)
Wins	Top tens	Poles
0	2	0

ARCA Menards Series West career
- 117 races run over 8 years
- Best finish: 3rd (1977, 1978)
- First race: 1973 Altamont 100 (Altamont)
- Last race: 1980 Budweiser 200 (Mesa Marin)
Wins	Top tens	Poles
0	67	2
- Statistics up to date as of May 12, 2026.

Richard White (born July 15, 1939) is an American former professional stock car racing driver. He competed in 12 NASCAR Winston Cup Series and 117 NASCAR Winston West Series races during his career.

== Racing career ==
White began competing in the NASCAR Late Model Sportsman National Championship in 1971, scoring a top ten. In 1973 White began competing full-time in the NASCAR Winston West Series, driving the No. 42 Ford for Dean Barnicle. In his series debut at Altamont, White finished in fifth. Across the season's twenty-one races, White scored sixteen top tens and finished the season fifth in the standings. He was awarded rookie of the year. White also made his NASCAR Winston Cup Series debut in 1973, finishing eighth and sixth in the races at Riverside International Raceway. White scaled back to part-time in 1974, running fourteen of twenty-eight races and scoring five top tens. In one Cup start, he finished nineteenth. He competed in fourteen West Series races again in 1975, scoring five more top tens. Engine issues caused him to again finish nineteenth in his lone Cup start of the year. The 1976 season spanned only thirteen races, and White competed in ten of them, finishing in the top ten eight times en route to a fifth place points position. White had attempted eleven total races, but failed to qualify for the Cup Series race at Ontario Motor Speedway. White competed full time in 1977, scoring a pole and nine top tens and ending the season a career-best third in points. White failed to qualify for the season opener at Riverside, but was running at the finish in the other two Winston Cup combination races. White also returned to the Late Model Sportsman Championship for at least one race, finishing sixteenth at Riverside. White continued competing full time in the West Series in 1978, scoring thirteen top tens across twenty-two races, and scored a career-high seven top tens. He led his first and only career Cup laps at Ontario, where he also scored his best Cup finish of the season. He scored a top five result in the Late Model Sportsman Championship and also competed in the NASCAR Grand American Stock Car National Championship, although results are unknown. White ran his final full-time West season in 1979, scoring a pole and eleven top tens. He led a career high seventy-one laps. In running the complete schedule, he made his final Winston Cup starts, finishing twenty-ninth, sixteenth, and thirtieth. White attempted a race in the Western States Open Competition Series at Craig Road Speedway, but failed to qualify. In 1980, he competed in the Copper World Classic at Phoenix International Raceway, finishing twenty-fourth. He is also known to have competed in the NASCAR Grand American Stock Car National Championship, although results are unknown. White made his final Winston West start at Mesa Marin Raceway, finishing twenty-first after retiring with oil pressure issues. His final known start in racing is a November 1981 race at Riverside, where he finished eleventh.

== Motorsports career results ==
=== NASCAR ===
(key) (Bold – Pole position awarded by qualifying time. Italics – Pole position earned by points standings or practice time. * – Most laps led.)

==== Winston Cup Series ====
NASCAR Winston Cup Series results
Year	Team	No.	Make	1	2	3	4	5	6	7	8	9	10	11	12	13	14	15	16	17	18	19	20	21	22	23	24	25	26	27	28	29	30	31	NWCSC	Pts	Ref
1973	White Racing	24	Ford	RSD; 8	DAY	RCH	CAR	BRI	ATL	NWS	DAR	MAR	TAL	NSV	CLT	DOV	TWS																		63rd	NA	
1973	White Racing	42	Ford															RSD; 6	MCH	DAY	BRI	ATL	TAL	NSV	DAR	RCH	DOV	NWS	MAR	CLT	CAR				63rd	NA	
1974	White Racing	42	Ford	RSD; 19	DAY	RCH	CAR	BRI	ATL	DAR	NWS	MAR	TAL	NSV	DOV	CLT	RSD	MCH	DAY	BRI	NSV	ATL	POC	TAL	MCH	DAR	RCH	DOV	NWS	MAR	CLT	CAR	ONT		108th	1.2	
1975	White Racing	2W	Chevy	RSD; 19	DAY	RCH	CAR	BRI	ATL	NWS	DAR	MAR	TAL	NSV	DOV	CLT	RSD	MCH	DAY	NSV	POC	TAL	MCH	DAR	DOV	NWS	MAR	CLT	RCH	CAR	BRI	ATL	ONT		83rd	106	
1976	White Racing	2	Chevy	RSD	DAY	CAR	RCH	BRI	ATL	NWS	DAR	MAR	TAL	NSV	DOV	CLT	RSD	MCH	DAY	NSV	POC	TAL	MCH	BRI	DAR	RCH	DOV	MAR	NWS	CLT	CAR	ATL	ONT; DNQ		144th	0	
1977	White Racing	27	Chevy	RSD; DNQ	DAY	RCH	CAR	ATL	NWS	DAR	BRI	MAR	TAL	NSV	DOV	CLT																			74th	185	
1977	White Racing	2	Chevy														RSD; 22	MCH	DAY	NSV	POC	TAL	MCH	BRI	DAR	RCH	DOV	MAR	NWS	CLT	CAR	ATL			74th	185	
1977	White Racing	20	Chevy																														ONT; 25		74th	185	
1978	White Racing	12	Chevy	RSD; 24	DAY	RCH	CAR	ATL	BRI	DAR	NWS	MAR	TAL	DOV	CLT	NSV	RSD; 19	MCH	DAY	NSV	POC	TAL	MCH	BRI	DAR	RCH	DOV	MAR	NWS	CLT	CAR	ATL	ONT; 18		55th	308	
1979	White Racing	22	Chevy	RSD; 29	DAY	CAR	RCH	ATL	NWS	BRI	DAR	MAR	TAL	NSV	DOV	CLT	TWS	RSD; 16	MCH	DAY	NSV	POC	TAL	MCH	BRI	DAR	RCH	DOV	MAR	CLT	NWS	CAR	ATL	ONT; 30	54th	264	

==== Winston West Series ====
NASCAR Winston West Series results
Year	Team	No.	Make	1	2	3	4	5	6	7	8	9	10	11	12	13	14	15	16	17	18	19	20	21	22	23	24	25	26	27	28	NWWSC	Pts	Ref
1973	White Racing	42	Ford	AMP; 5	MAD; 7	S99; 6	AUR; 5	KFS; 13	CBS; 8	USP; 10	POR; 11	SPS; 8	WER; 5	SGS; 4	CAJ; 11*	OSS; 17	CSP; 7	BKS; 9	LAG; 5	EVG; 8	WSP; 7	YAK; 10	POR; 7	AMP; 16								5th	1578.75	
1974	White Racing	42	Ford	RSD; 19	AMP; 8	S99	MSP; 6	COR; 2	SBP; 21	ASP; 4	RSD	WER	WSP	SPS	STA	USP	POR	MED	EUG	CBS												17th	747	
1974	White Racing	21	Chevy																		CAJ; 22	CRS	ASP; 11	AMP; 21	CSP; 13		YAK; 25	POR	SGB; 9	ASP; 17	ONT	17th	747	
1974	White Racing	21	Ford																							EVG; 13						17th	747	
1975	White Racing	2	Chevy	RSD; 19																												8th	865.75	
1975	White Racing	21	Chevy		LAG; 23	MSP; 3	ASP; 14	RSD	ASP; 12	USP	POR; 18	EVG; 10	SMS; 12	CRS; 4	CSP; 10	ASP; 5	EVG; 15	YAK; 13	POR; 14	MSP	ONT											8th	865.75	
1976	White Racing	2	Chevy	RSD	RSD	EVG; 14	WSP; 8	USP; 7	POR; 7	SHA; 9	SGS; 5	EVG; 19	YAK; 7	POR; 10	LAG; 4	ONT; DNQ																5th	738	
1977	White Racing	2	Chevy	RSD	LAG; 11	ONT; 9	SJS; 6	MMR; 4	**ASP**; 13	RSD; 22	SGS; 5	YAK; 15	EVG; 11	WSP; 9	USP; 8	POR; 11	AAS; 6	CRS; 3	ASP; 17	SHA; 14	POR; 17		PHO; 8									3rd	1355.25	
1977	White Racing	20	Chevy																			ONT; 25										3rd	1355.25	
1978	White Racing	12	Chevy	RSD; 24						RSD; 19														ONT; 18								3rd	954	
1978	White Racing	2	Chevy		AAS; 11	S99; 5	SHA; 4	PET; 3	MMR; 5		IFS; 6	YAK; 7	WSP; 17	LSP; 11	EVG; 12	POR; 7	CRS; 2	ASP; 2	SON; 9	SHA; 14	CBS; 5	YAK; 6	OSS; 10		PHO; 12							3rd	954	
1979	White Racing	22	Chevy	RSD; 29		RSD; 16												ONT; 30														4th	691	
1979	White Racing	2	Chevy		MMR; 7		EVG; 7	YAK; 9	POR; 5	AAS; 7	SHA; 10	CRS; 5	SON; 6	EVG; 3	**SPO**; 8	POR; 18	ASP; 12*		PHO; 10													4th	691	
1980	Guy Racing	57	Chevy	RSD	ONT	S99	RSD	LAG	EVG	POR	SON	MMR; 21	ONT	PHO																		NA	NA	
