= Pat Mintey =

American racing driver (1947–2021)

- Born: Patrick Norman Mintey Sr. May 25, 1947; Pasadena, California, U.S.
- Died: October 15, 2021 (aged 74); Springville, Utah, U.S.
- Awards: 1977 NASCAR Winston West Series Rookie of the Year

NASCAR Cup Series career
- 3 races run over 2 years
- Best finish: 77th (1983)
- First race: 1981 Winston Western 500 (Riverside)
- Last race: 1983 Winston Western 500 (Riverside)
Wins	Top tens	Poles
0	0	0

ARCA Menards Series West career
- 109 races run over 13 years
- Best finish: 5th (1977)
- First race: 1972 Las Vegas Lucky 21 150 (Craig Road)
- Last race: 1988 American National Bank 200 (Mesa Marin)
Wins	Top tens	Poles
0	41	0
- Statistics up to date as of October 5, 2026.

Patrick Norman Mintey Sr. (May 25, 1947 – October 15, 2021) was an American former professional stock car racing driver. He primarily competed in the NASCAR Winston West Series between 1972 and 1988.

== Racing career ==
Mintey raced at Saugus Speedway in the late 1960s and early 1970s. He began competing in the NASCAR Winston West Series in 1972, running three races with a best finish of eleventh in his debut at Craig Road Speedway. Mintey ran three NASCAR Late Model Sportsman National Championship races during the 1975 season. Mintey did not return to the Winston West Series until 1977, where he ran seventeen of twenty races, scoring seven top-tens with a best finish of second at Ascot Park. He finished fifth in the standings and was awarded Rookie of the Year. He also made his only USAC Stock Car Series start at Ontario Motor Speedway, finishing thirteenth. He finished 35th in his only known NASCAR Late Model Sportsman start of the year at Riverside. Mintey ran nineteen Winston West races in 1978, scoring eight top-tens, including three fourth-place finishes. He made twelve starts in 1979, scoring four top-tens. Mintey only made six starts in 1980, but again scored four top-tens. He ran twelve of fourteen races in 1981, scoring six top-tens. This schedule included his NASCAR Winston Cup Series debut in the November 1981 Winston Western 500 at Riverside International Raceway, a combination race, where he finished 34th due to engine issues. Mintey made six Winston West starts in 1982, scoring a top-ten at Riverside. He ran all ten races in 1983, scoring six top-tens with a best finish of second at Sears Point International Raceway. He finished 37th and 29th in the combination races at Riverside due to overheating issues in the first and engine issues in the second. Mintey made nine Winston West starts in 1984, scoring two top-tens with a best finish of fourth at Shasta Speedway. He failed to qualify for the second Riverside combination race. Mintey made five Winston West starts in 1985, leading his only career laps at Shasta and scoring a top-ten at Willow Springs Speedway. He failed to qualify for his final Winston Cup attempt, the first Riverside combination race of the season. Mintey made five Winston West starts in 1986, scoring his final two top-tens at the Tacoma Dome and Willow Springs Speedway. Mintey made just one start in 1987, finishing 26th at the Tacoma Dome due to overheating issues. Mintey's final season was 1988, where he ran four races with a best finish of fourteenth twice. He finished nineteenth in the track standings at The Bullring at Las Vegas Motor Speedway in 1993.

== Personal life ==
Mintey was born to Leonard "Doc" Mintey and Monique Gerarden on May 25, 1947 in Pasadena, California. He graduated from Verdugo Hills High School. He was married to Paula Gromman, and they had two children, Patrick Jr. and Shelley. Patrick Jr. also became a racing driver, joining the sportsman class at Saugus Speedway in 1990, a track where his father as well as uncle Mike Mintey competed.

== Motorsports career results ==
=== NASCAR ===
(key) (Bold – Pole position awarded by qualifying time. Italics – Pole position earned by points standings or practice time. * – Most laps led.)

==== Winston Cup Series ====
NASCAR Winston Cup Series results
Year	Team	No.	Make	1	2	3	4	5	6	7	8	9	10	11	12	13	14	15	16	17	18	19	20	21	22	23	24	25	26	27	28	29	30	31	NWCSC	Pts	Ref
1981	Pat Mintey	35	Chevy	RSD	DAY	RCH	CAR	ATL	BRI	NWS	DAR	MAR	TAL	NSV	DOV	CLT	TWS	RSD	MCH	DAY	NSV	POC	TAL	MCH	BRI	DAR	RCH	DOV	MAR	NWS	CLT	CAR	ATL	RSD; 34	103rd	61	
1983	Pat Mintey	35	Pontiac	DAY	RCH	CAR	ATL	DAR	NWS	MAR	TAL	NSV	DOV	BRI	CLT	RSD; 37	POC	MCH	DAY	NSV	POC	TAL	MCH	BRI	DAR	RCH	DOV	MAR	NWS	CLT	CAR	ATL			77th	128	
1983	Pat Mintey	35	Chevy																														RSD; 29		77th	128	
1984	Pat Mintey	35	Chevy	DAY	RCH	CAR	ATL	BRI	NWS	DAR	MAR	TAL	NSV	DOV	CLT	RSD	POC	MCH	DAY	NSV	POC	TAL	MCH	BRI	DAR	RCH	DOV	MAR	CLT	NWS	CAR	ATL	RSD; DNQ		140th	0	
1985	Pat Mintey	35	Unknown	DAY	RCH	CAR	ATL	BRI	DAR	NWS	MAR	TAL	DOV	CLT	RSD; DNQ	POC	MCH	DAY	POC	TAL	MCH	BRI	DAR	RCH	DOV	MAR	NWS	CLT	CAR	ATL	RSD				131st	0	

==== Winston West Series ====
NASCAR Winston West Series results
Year	Team	No.	Make	1	2	3	4	5	6	7	8	9	10	11	12	13	14	15	16	17	18	19	20	21	22	23	24	25	26	27	28	29	30	NWWSC	Pts	Ref
1972	Mike Mintey	24	Chevy	RSD	ONT	SJS	S99	SMN	TCR	YAK	EVG	RSD	MED	POR	IFS	MER	SPS	LSP	WSP	SKA	RAS	CRS; 11	OSS; 19	SGS; 24	CSP	BKS	EVG	USP	YAK	POR	ASP	WCR	SMN	NA	157.5	
1977	Pat Mintey	35	Chevy	RSD	LAG; 27	ONT; 10	SJS; 11	MMR; 11	ASP; 2	RSD	SGS; 12	YAK; 16	EVG; 17	WSP; 10	USP; 10	POR; 14	AAS; 8	CRS; 9	ASP; 11	SHA; 16	POR; 7	ONT	PHO; 12											5th	1214.5	
1978	Pat Mintey	35	Chevy	RSD	AAS; 14	S99; 18	SHA; 13	PET; 7	MMR; 11	RSD	IFS; 20	YAK; 19	WSP; 9	LSP; 12	EVG; 11	POR; 10	CRS; 7	ASP; 4	SON; 4	SHA; 11	CBS; 9	YAK; 18	OSS; 4	ONT	PHO; 15									9th	753	
1979	Pat Mintey	35	Chevy	RSD	MMR; 12	RSD	EVG; 12	YAK; 12	POR; 10	AAS; 11	SHA; 7	CRS; 8	SON; 28	EVG	SPO; 18	POR; 19	ASP; 10	ONT	PHO; 18															8th	447	
1980	Pat Mintey	35	Chevy	RSD	ONT; 6	S99; 6	RSD	LAG; 25	EVG	POR	SON; 10	MMR; 8	ONT	PHO; 13																				11th	271	
1981	Pat Mintey	35	Chevy	RSD	S99; 15	AAS; 16	MMR; 9	RSD	LAG; 11	POR; 10	WSP; 7	EVG; 6	SHA; 15	RSD; 7	SON; 17	RSD; 34	PHO; 8																	7th	530	
1982	Pat Mintey	35	Chevy	MMR	S99	AAS	RSD	POR; 17	WSP; 17	SHA	EVG	SON; 11	CDR; 16	RSD; 9	RSD	PHO; 24																		18th	212	
1983	Pat Mintey	35	Chevy	S99; 10	SON; 2		YAK; 8	EVG; 10	SHA; 6	RSD; 17	CPL; 6	RSD; 29	PHO; 20																					7th	408	
1983	Pat Mintey	35	Pontiac			RSD; 37																												7th	408	
1984	Pat Mintey	35	Chevy	RSD	YAK; 15	SIR; 15	POR; 13	EVG; 6	SHA; 4	WSR; 19	SON; 13	MMR; 12	RSD; DNQ	PHO; 24																				11th	338	
1985	Pat Mintey	35	Chevy	SON; 18	SHA; 11		MMR; 17	SIR	POR	STA	YAK	EVG; 14	WSR; 6	MMR	RSD																			15th	189	
1985	Pat Mintey	35	Unknown			RSD; DNQ																												15th	189	
1986	Pat Mintey	35	Chevy	SON; 16	RSD	EVG; 13	RCS	TAC; 7	PIR; 11	WSR; 9	RSD																							12th	199	
1987	McKnight Racing	88	Ford	SON	RSD	SGP	EVG	POR	TAC; 26	MMR	RSD																							46th	25	
1988	Unknown	54	Buick	SON; 14	MMR; 18	RSD	SGP	POR	EVG; 14	MMR; 22	PHO																							23rd	126	
