= 1980 NASCAR Winston West Series =

27th season of the NASCAR Winston West Series

Seasons
- ← 1979 1981 →

The 1980 NASCAR Winston West Series was the 27th season of the series. The title was won by Roy Smith, his first in the series.

== Teams and drivers ==
=== Complete schedule ===
Manufacturer	Team	No.	Driver
Oldsmobile 6 Chevrolet 4	Puskarich Racing	13	Don Puskarich
Oldsmobile 5 Pontiac 5 Buick 1	Schmitt Racing	73	Bill Schmitt
Pontiac 7 Buick 4	McCray Racing	08	Rick McCray
Pontiac 8 Chevrolet 3	A. J. Kurten	78	Jim Robinson
Pontiac 7 Oldsmobile 3 Chevrolet 1	Robert Beadle	11	Roy Smith

=== Partial schedule ===
Manufacturer	Team	No.	Driver	Races
Buick	Fox Garage Racing	09	Bob Fox	1
Buick	Gautsche Racing	82	Ron Gautsche	2
Buick	Gautsche Racing	82	Neil Bonnett	1
Buick	McCray Racing	0	Don Hume	1
Chevrolet	Baldwin Engineering	91	Gary Matthews	1
Chevrolet	Baldwin Engineering	97	Bill Osborne	1
Chevrolet	Baldwin Engineering	97	Gary Matthews	1
Chevrolet	Baldwin Enterprises	92	Tim McMillan	3
Chevrolet	Dale Sorenson	61	Don Stanley	7
Chevrolet	Dave McEwin	16	Dave McEwin	3
Chevrolet	Dick Whalen (Note: Betty Whalen was the listed owner at Riverside)	6	Dick Whalen	4
Chevrolet	DiGard Motorsports	55	Don Whittington	1
Chevrolet	Don Guy Racing	57	Jim Hopkinson (Note: Entries were fielded in collaboration with Hopkinson Racing)	3
Chevrolet	Don Guy Racing	57	Steve Pfeifer (Note: Entry at Ontario was fielded in collaboration with Pfeifer Racing)	2
Chevrolet	Don Guy Racing	57	Billy Clarkson	2
Chevrolet	Don Guy Racing	57	Richard White	1
Chevrolet	Esau Racing	0	George Esau	1
Chevrolet	Gray Racing	19	Vince Giamformaggio	1
Chevrolet	Hale Racing	52	Ed Hale	1
Chevrolet	Jack Housby	49	Kevin Housby	1
Chevrolet	Jim Mayeda	65	Gary Mayeda	2
Chevrolet	Jim Mayeda	65	Tim McMillan	1
Chevrolet	John Krebs Racing	91	John Krebs	2
Chevrolet	Kord Racing	94	Steve Pfeifer (Note: Entries were fielded in collaboration with Pfeifer Racing)	6
Chevrolet	Kord Racing	94	Don Graham	1
Chevrolet	Kranzler Racing	14	Dick Kranzler	1
Chevrolet	Lillian Ward	60	Glen Ward	8
Chevrolet	McGuire Racing	94	Steve McGuire	1
Chevrolet	O'Dell Racing	69	Ron O'Dell	3
Chevrolet	Pat Mintey	35	Pat Mintey	6
Chevrolet	Petty Enterprises	42	Kyle Petty	2
Chevrolet	Richard Peralta	20	Ed Hale	1
Chevrolet	Sedgwick Racing	25	Bill Sedgwick	1
Chevrolet	Thonesen Racing	77	Gene Thonesen	4
Chevrolet	Ulrich Racing	4	Bobby Allison	1
Chevrolet	Ulrich Racing	40	Stan Barrett	2
Chevrolet	Ulrich Racing	40	Bill Whittington	1
Chevrolet	Wahl Racing	37	Chuck Wahl	1
Chevrolet	Wahl Racing	37	Bob Switzer	1
Chevrolet	Walters Racing	67	Doug Walters	1
Chevrolet	Unknown	05	Ed Rains	2
Chevrolet	Unknown	6	Pappy Pryor	1
Chevrolet	Unknown	67	Pappy Pryor	1
Chevrolet	Unknown	68	Mel Larson	1
Chevrolet	Unknown	80	Ralph Ridley Jr.	1
Dodge	Davis Racing	22	St. James Davis	3
Dodge	Davis Racing	22	Steve Pfeifer	1
Dodge	Kieper Racing	93	Chuck Bown	1
Dodge	Palmer Racing	93	Hershel McGriff (Note: McGriff ran the complete schedule split between the Midgely Racing No. 20, Midgley Racing No. 29, Palmer Racing No. 93, and Kieper Racing No. 98 entries)	4
Dodge	Walter Ross	32	Marc Vogel	6
Dodge	Unknown	80	Dan Reed	2
Ford	Jack Malugani	90	Jack Malugani	2
Ford	Jefferson Racing	95	Don Dowdy	3
Matador	Allison Racing	12	Davey Allison	1
Mercury	Cook & Sons	21	Ivan Baldwin	1
Mercury	Cook & Sons	21	Donnie Allison	1
Oldsmobile	Jim Stacy Racing	5	Joe Ruttman	2
Oldsmobile	McCluney Enterpises	72	John Soares Jr.	2
Oldsmobile	Williamson Racing	9	Jimmy Insolo	2
Oldsmobile	Williamson Racing	9	Bobby Allison	1
Oldsmobile	Williamson Racing	9	Mike Bonicelli	1
Plymouth	Neal Newberry	04	Neal Newberry	1
Plymouth	Unknown	52	Glen Thorburn	1
Plymouth	Unknown	64	Garrett Evans	1
Pontiac	Barker Racing	25	Bob Barker	2
Pontiac	Bishop Enterprises	96	Sharon Bishop	5
Pontiac	Bown Racing	16	Jim Bown	4
Pontiac	Don Graham Racing	52	Billy Clarkson	2
Pontiac	Don Guy Racing	2	Robert Tartaglia	8
Pontiac	Eaton Racing	7	Ron Eaton	3
Pontiac	Eaton Racing	7	Buddy Baker	1
Pontiac	Esau Racing	15	Bobby Allison	1
Pontiac	Esau Racing	15	Ron Esau	1
Pontiac	Hitchcox Racing	40	Billy Hitchcox	1
Pontiac	Midgely Racing	20	Hershel McGriff	1
Pontiac	Renegade Racing	28	Jerry Bowers	1
Pontiac	Seifert Racing	3	Billy Zimmerman Jr.	2
Pontiac	Unknown	10	Ernie Irvan	3
Pontiac	Unknown	10	David Pearson	1
Pontiac	Unknown	12	Bill Donnelly	1
Pontiac	Unknown	19	LeRoy Anderson	1
Pontiac	Unknown	33	Archie Somers	1
Pontiac	Unknown	33	Richard Ritthaler	1
Pontiac	Unknown	82	Ross Kusah	2
Pontiac	Unknown	88	Jack Jeffery	1
Buick 5 Chevrolet 1	Francis Racing	33	Glenn Francis	6
Buick 1 Ford 1 Mercury 1	Cook & Sons	12	David Pearson	1
Buick 1 Ford 1 Mercury 1	Cook & Sons	12	Bobby Allison	1
Buick 1 Ford 1 Mercury 1	Cook & Sons	12	Neil Bonnett	1
Buick 1 Pontiac 1	Schmitt Racing	3	Bob Bondurant	2
Chevrolet 4 Buick 1	Petty Enterprises	43	Richard Petty	5
Chevrolet 3 Pontiac 1	Go-En Racing	17	Harry Goularte	4
Pontiac 2 Buick 1	Rodney Friesen	52	Don Graham	3
Pontiac 4 Chevrolet 3	John Borneman	81	John Borneman	7
Pontiac 6 Chevrolet 1	Kieper Racing	98	Johnny Kieper	5
Pontiac 6 Chevrolet 1	Kieper Racing	98	Hershel McGriff	1
Pontiac 6 Chevrolet 1	Kieper Racing	98	Mike Chase	1
Pontiac 6 Chevrolet 1	Midgely Racing	29	Hershel McGriff	5
Pontiac 6 Chevrolet 1	Midgely Racing	29	Ron Esau	1
Pontiac 6 Chevrolet 1	Midgely Racing	29	Terry Forsythe	1
Pontiac 7 Oldsmobile 3	Don Waterman	38	Don Waterman	10

== Schedule and results ==
The 1980 season included 11 individual races, although Riverside International Raceway and Ontario Motor Speedway hosted two races each. Both races at Riverside and the second race at Ontario were in combination with the NASCAR Winston Cup Series.

Date	Name	Racetrack	Location	Winner
January 13	Winston Western 500	Riverside International Raceway	Riverside, California	Darrell Waltrip
April 13	Datsun Twin 200	Ontario Motor Speedway	Ontario, California	Roy Smith
May 17	Stockton Winston 200	Stockton 99 Speedway	Stockton, California	Ivan Baldwin
June 8	Warner W. Hodgdon 400	Riverside International Raceway	Riverside, California	Darrell Waltrip
June 22	Winston Monterey 200	Laguna Seca Raceway	Monterey, California	Jimmy Insolo
June 29	Reed Cams 200	Evergreen Speedway	Monroe, Washington	Ron Eaton
August 10	G.I. Joe's/Heidelberg Portland 200	Rose City Speedway	Portland, Oregon	Bobby Allison
August 24	Golden State Winston 100	Sears Point International Raceway	Sonoma, California	Jimmy Insolo
November 8	Budweiser 200	Mesa Marin Raceway	Bakersfield, California	Bobby Allison
November 15	Los Angeles Times 500	Ontario Motor Speedway	Ontario, California	Benny Parsons
November 23	Arizona Winston 250	Phoenix International Raceway	Avondale, Arizona	Richard Petty

== Full Drivers' Championship ==
(key) Bold – Pole position awarded by time. Italics – Pole position set by owner's points. * – Most laps led. † – Ineligible for West Series points

Pos	Driver	RSD	ONT	S99	RSD	LAG	EVG	POR	SON	MMR	ONT	PHO	Pts
1	Roy Smith	13	1	23	28	3	4	2	14	**2**	36	18	486
2	Bill Schmitt	5	**2***	21	13	19	16	7	4	5	11	6	478
3	Jim Robinson	24	5	2	20	2	8	4	13	22	28	30	462
4	Rick McCray	35	4	3	32	5	24	3	18	16	19	27	439
5	Hershel McGriff	26	3	5	24	26	26	21	22	4	23	4	434
6	Don Waterman		7	4	25	4	22	11	21	17	20	10	405
7	Don Puskarich	19	10	18	17	18	28	18	23	18	42	23	390
8	Robert Tartaglia		8	17		10	13	13	8	11		22	373
9	Glen Ward		15	8		16	10	15	12	13	35		346
10	Steve Pfeifer	27	29	19	21	11	21		6	15		21	325
11	Pat Mintey		6	6		25			10	8		13	271
12	Glenn Francis		13	9		6			17	14	32		241
13	John Borneman	31	31	13	34	23	25					5	240
14	Marc Vogel		22	12		15			11	9		24	213
15	Don Stanley		17	16		27	23	19	27		DNQ		207
16	Harry Goularte		9			14			3			14	199
17	Johnny Kieper		25			9	3	6	24				188
18	Jim Bown						5	20		6		7	166
19	Dick Whalen	DNQ	26			13						19	163
20	Sharon Bishop		18	20		24		17	16				160
21	Ron Eaton			**11**			**1***	**5**					146
22	Don Graham		30	15		20			9				130
23	Billy Clarkson							16	28	10		25	125
24	Jimmy Insolo					**1***			1*				120
25	Jim Hopkinson			24	27	12							110
26	Ernie Irvan			10		22		23					98
27	Gene Thonesen	DNQ	24	DNQ					15				96
28	Tim McMillan		23			21	29				DNQ		80
29	David Pearson			7			19						76
30	Don Dowdy		DNQ				2					28	72
31	St. James Davis	DNQ		14		DNQ							69
32	John Krebs		12	22									68
33	Ed Hale		28		29								65
34	Dave McEwin			DNQ					19	20			63
35	Ron O'Dell		21								DNQ	DNQ	61
	Bob Bondurant								**2**			9	49
	Vince Giamformaggio	20											47
	Neil Bonnett	34†			2†				5	3	2†		46
	Neal Newberry						6						45
	Chuck Wahl	25											45
	Bobby Allison	18†			15*†	7		1*		1*	4†	2*	44
	Billy Hitchcox						7						44
	John Soares Jr.			DNQ					7				44
	Richard Ritthaler							8					43
	Bob Barker					8						DNQ	43
	Ross Kusah						9	9					42
	Billy Zimmerman Jr.						11	10					40
	Bob Switzer		11										40
	Mike Bonicelli											11	40
	Bill Osborne	37											40
	Stan Barrett										13	12	39
	Dan Reed			DNQ						12			39
	Archie Somers						12						39
	Doug Walters							14					37
	George Esau		14										37
	LeRoy Anderson						14						37
	Mike Chase											15	36
	Jack Jeffery						15						36
	Dick Kranzler		16										35
	Mel Larson											16	35
	Bob Fox						17						34
	Kevin Housby											17	34
	Garrett Evans						18						33
	Bill Sedgwick		19										32
	Ed Rains						20	12					31
	Jack Malugani		20	DNQ									31
	Gary Mayeda								20			DNQ	31
	Ron Gautsche					28		22					29
	Pappy Pryor									23		DNQ	28
	Ron Esau								25			26	26
	Buddy Baker								26				25
	Bill Donnelly						27						24
	Gary Matthews	DNQ	27										24
	Glen Thorburn						30						21
	Ralph Ridley Jr.						31						20
	Richard Petty	3†			8†	17					30†	**1**	
	Ivan Baldwin			1*									
	Kyle Petty										33†	3	
	Terry Forsythe									7			
	Bill Whittington	8											
	Joe Ruttman										40†	8	
	Don Whittington	9			35†								
	Donnie Allison				30†					19	39†		
	Don Hume											20	
	Richard White									21			
	Jerry Bowers									24			
	Chuck Bown	36†									27		
	Davey Allison											29	
	Steve McGuire											DNQ	
	Tim Williamson	Wth		Wth									

== See also ==
- 1980 NASCAR Winston Cup Series
