= Ron Gautsche =

American racing driver (1935–2024)

- Born: July 6, 1935; Truckee, California, U.S.
- Died: August 22, 2024 (aged 89)

NASCAR Cup Series career
- 5 races run over 2 years
- Best finish: 87th (1972)
- First race: 1971 Motor Trend 500 (Riverside)
- Last race: 1972 Miller High Life 500 (Ontario)
Wins	Top tens	Poles
0	0	0

ARCA Menards Series West career
- 131 races run over 10 years
- Best finish: 4th (1974)
- First race: 1971 Motor Trend 500 (Riverside)
- Last race: 1984 Suncrest Motorhomes 200 (Mesa Marin)
Wins	Top tens	Poles
0	71	1
- Statistics up to date as of May 20, 2026.

Ron Gautsche (July 6, 1935 – August 22, 2024) was an American professional stock car racing driver, team owner, and crew chief. He primarily competed in the NASCAR Winston West Series, racing in the series between 1971 and 1984.

== Racing career ==
Before racing in NASCAR, Gautsche began his career on a dirt track near Reno before moving to modifieds. He simultaneously made his NASCAR Winston Cup Series and NASCAR Winston West Series in the 1971 Motor Trend 500 at Riverside International Raceway, finishing nineteenth. He ran a total of 17 races across the 26 race West Series season, scoring five top-tens. Gautsche also made two more Cup starts, coming in the other combination races at Ontario Motor Speedway and Riverside. Gautsche ran a majority of the West schedule in 1972, scoring 12 top-ten finishes in 27 starts. He also made his final Winston Cup starts, finishing 35th in both and failing to qualify for his final attempt. Gautsche competed full-time in the West Series in 1973, again scoring 12 top-tens. He finished sixth in the standings. On September 2, 1973, Gautsche was competing in the West Series race at Evergreen Speedway when he veered out of control, apparently hitting an oil slick, and slid into the track's infield, where 42 year old Samuel "Pat" Pattison, a NASCAR track steward from Long Beach, was assisting the injured George Jefferson, crew chief for Harry Jefferson, who had been struck by Ron Eaton. Gautsche struck Pattison, sending him approximately sixty feet into the air; Pattison was pronounced dead upon arriving at the hospital. Gautsche's best season came in 1974, where, across twenty-five starts, he scored a career-high nineteen top-tens and seven top-fives, including a career-best second, finishing fourth in the final points standings. In 1975, Gautsche ran eleven races, finishing top-ten in eight of them. Gautsche began competing for Don Guy Racing rather than his own team in 1976, scoring five top-tens in ten races. He continued competing for the team in 1977, scoring six top-tens across 11 races. In 1978, Gautsche ran five races for Guy and one for Gene Thonesen, scoring three top-tens and his first and only career pole. Gautsche competed in the Rose Classic at All American Speedway in 1979, finishing fifteenth. After not competing in the West Series in 1979, Gautsche competed in two races for his team in 1980, although he failed to start at Laguna Seca Raceway. His final start came in 1984, where he finished ninth at Mesa Marin Raceway; he made his final attempt in the season finale at Phoenix International Raceway, where he failed to qualify.

== Team ownership ==
Gautsche owned Gautsche Racing with his wife Shirnell, where he ran a majority of the races in his career. The team also fielded drivers such as Ross Kusah, Neil Bonnett, and J. C. Danielsen. The team competed with Danielsen in the 1988 Goodyear NASCAR 500, an exhibition race at the Calder Park Thunderdome in Australia, where he finished in ninth.

== Motorsports career results ==
=== NASCAR ===
(key) (Bold – Pole position awarded by qualifying time. Italics – Pole position earned by points standings or practice time. * – Most laps led.)

==== Winston Cup Series ====
NASCAR Winston Cup Series results
Year	Team	No.	Make	1	2	3	4	5	6	7	8	9	10	11	12	13	14	15	16	17	18	19	20	21	22	23	24	25	26	27	28	29	30	31	32	33	34	35	36	37	38	39	40	41	42	43	44	45	46	47	48	NWCSC	Pts	Ref
1971	Gautsche Racing	82	Ford	RSD; 19	DAY	DAY	DAY	ONT; 49	RCH	CAR	HCY	BRI	ATL	CLB	GPS	SMR	NWS	MAR	DAR	SBO	TAL	ASH	KPT	CLT	DOV	MCH	RSD; 25	HOU	GPS	DAY	BRI	AST	ISP	TRN	NSV	ATL	BGS	ONA	MCH	TAL	CLB	HCY	DAR	MAR	CLT	DOV	CAR	MGR	RCH	NWS	TWS	NA	NA	
1972	Gautsche Racing	82	Ford	RSD; 35	DAY	RCH																																														87th	332.75	
1972	Gautsche Racing	82W	Ford				ONT; 35	CAR	ATL	BRI	DAR	NWS	MAR	TAL	CLT	DOV	MCH	RSD; DNQ	TWS	DAY	BRI	TRN	ATL	TAL	MCH	NSV	DAR	RCH	DOV	MAR	NWS	CLT	CAR	TWS																		87th	332.75	

==== Winston West Series ====
NASCAR Winston West Series results
Year	Team	No.	Make	1	2	3	4	5	6	7	8	9	10	11	12	13	14	15	16	17	18	19	20	21	22	23	24	25	26	27	28	29	30	NWWSC	Pts	Ref
1971	Gautsche Racing	82	Ford	RSD; 19	ONT; 49	OSS	SJS; 21	CRS	S99; 7	ASP	RSD; 25	SAL; 12	SPS; 7	SKA; 17	USP; 17	POR; 21	LSP	MED	DCS	CRS; 15	OSS; 17	SGS	BKS; 18	CSP; 10	EVG; 25	IFS; 8	YAK; 9	SGB	TWS					12th	690	
1972	Gautsche Racing	82	Ford	RSD; 35		SJS; 6	S99; 22	SMN; 22	TCR; 14	YAK; 18	EVG		MED; 7	POR; 9		MER; 11	SPS; 13	LSP; 12	WSP; 5	SKA; 8	RAS; 6	CRS; 8	OSS	SGS; 9	CSP; 14	BKS; 11	EVG; 5	USP; 10	YAK; 15	POR; 9	ASP; 17	WCR; 12	SMN; 9	10th	2074	
1972	Gautsche Racing	82W	Ford		ONT; 35							RSD; DNQ																						10th	2074	
1972	Gautsche Racing	82	Chevy												IFS; 13																			10th	2074	
1973	Gautsche Racing	82	Ford	AMP; 6	MAD; 14	S99; 9	AUR; 8	KFS; 9	CBS; 9	USP; 11	POR; 14	SPS; 10	WER; 6	SGS; 5	CAJ; 10	OSS; 13	CSP; 8	BKS; 11	LAG; 10	EVG; 15	WSP; 10		POR; 19	AMP; 11										6th	1503.75	
1973	Gautsche Racing	82	Chevy																			YAK; 16												6th	1503.75	
1974	Gautsche Racing	82	Ford	RSD	AMP; 2	S99; 5	MSP; 4	COR; 9	SBP; 6	ASP; 5	RSD	WER; 3	WSP; 5	SPS; 6	STA; 7	USP; 14	POR; 9	MED; 6	EUG; 10	CBS; 5	CAJ; 14	CRS; 6	ASP; 13	AMP; 8	CSP; 7	EVG; 19	YAK; 15	POR; 9	SGB; 8	ASP; 11	ONT			4th	1837.75	
1975	Gautsche Racing	82	Chevy	RSD	LAG; 8	MSP; 10	ASP; 6	RSD	ASP	USP; 10	POR; 11	EVG	SMS		CSP; 6	ASP; 6	EVG; 4	YAK; 11	POR; 24	MSP	ONT													10th	743.25	
1975	Gautsche Racing	82	Ford											CRS; 5																				10th	743.25	
1976	Don Guy Racing	57	Chevy	RSD	RSD	EVG; 9	WSP; 5	USP; 12	POR; 13	SHA; 10	SGS; 11	EVG; 10	YAK; 11	POR; 23	LAG; 7	ONT																		8th	653.5	
1977	Don Guy Racing	57	Chevy	RSD	LAG; 7	ONT	SJS; 12	MMR; 9	ASP; 3	RSD	SGS	YAK	EVG; 20	WSP	USP; 12	POR; 15	AAS; 7	CRS; 8	ASP; 5	SHA; 11	POR	ONT	PHO											12th	741.75	
1978	Don Guy Racing	57	Chevy	RSD	AAS; 13	S99; 19	SHA; 7	PET; 2										**ASP**; 5	SON	SHA	CBS	YAK	OSS	ONT	PHO									20th	243	
1978	Thonesen Racing	77	Chevy						MMR; 17	RSD	IFS	YAK	WSP	LSP	EVG	POR	CRS																	20th	243	
1980	Gautsche Racing	82	Buick	RSD	ONT	S99	RSD	LAG; 28	EVG	POR; 22	SON	MMR	ONT	PHO																				NA	29	
1984	Gautsche Racing	82	Buick	RSD	YAK	SIR	POR	EVG	SHA	WSR	SON	MMR; 9	RSD	PHO; DNQ																				33rd	42	
