= 1972 NASCAR Winston West Series =

19th season of the NASCAR Winston West Series

Seasons
- ← 1971 1973 →

The 1972 NASCAR Winston West Series was the 19th season of the series. The title was won by Ray Elder, his fourth in succession.

== Schedule and results ==
The 1972 season included 30 individual races, although Riverside International Raceway, Sierra Mesa National Raceway, Yakima Speedway, Evergreen Speedway, and Portland Speedway hosted two races each. The races at Riverside and the race at Ontario Motor Speedway were in combination with the NASCAR Winston Cup Series.

Date	Name	Racetrack	Location	Winner
January 23	Winston Western 500	Riverside International Raceway	Riverside, California	Richard Petty
March 5	Miller High Life 500	Ontario Motor Speedway	Ontario, California	A. J. Foyt
March 19	San Jose 150	San Jose Speedway	San Jose, California	Jack McCoy
May 13	Stockton 150	Stockton 99 Speedway	Stockton, California	Dick Bown
May 14	Sierra Mesa 100	Sierra Mesa National Raceway	Marysville, California	Ray Elder
May 26	Tri-City 150	Tri-City Raceway	West Richland, Washington	Jack McCoy
May 27	Yakima 500	Yakima Speedway	Yakima, Washington	Hershel McGriff
May 28	Evergreen 200	Evergreen Speedway	Monroe, Washington	Ray Elder
June 18	Golden State 400	Riverside International Raceway	Riverside, California	Ray Elder
June 23	Medford 100	Medford Speedway	Medford, Oregon	Hershel McGriff
June 25	Portland 100	Portland Speedway	Portland, Oregon	Hershel McGriff
June 28	Spokane 100	Interstate Fairground Speedway	Spokane, Washington	Hershel McGriff
June 30	Meridian 100	Meridian Speedway	Meridian, Idaho	Ray Elder
July 1	Spanaway 150	Spanaway Speedway	Spanaway, Washington	Jack McCoy
July 2	Langley 150	Langley Speedway	Langley, British Columbia	Hershel McGriff
July 3	Victoria 150	Western Speedway	Victoria, British Columbia	Dick Bown
July 4	Skagit 150	Skagit Speedway	Mount Vernon, Washington	Hershel McGriff
July 11	Redwood Acres 100	Redwood Acres Speedway	Eureka, California	Hershel McGriff
August 4	Las Vegas Lucky 21 150	Craig Wood Speedway	North Las Vegas, Nevada	Hershel McGriff
August 5	Orange 150	Orange Show Speedway	San Bernardino, California	Hershel McGriff
August 12	Saugus 150	Saugus Speedway	Saugus, California	Hershel McGriff
August 18	Clovis Vineyard 100	Clovis Speedway	Clovis, California	Jack McCoy
August 19	Bakersfield 150	Bakersfield Speedway	Oildale, California	Hershel McGriff
September 3	Ranier Beer 250	Evergreen Speedway	Monroe, Washington	Ray Elder
September 8	Umatilla 125	Umatilla Speedway	Hermiston, Oregon	Ray Elder
September 9	Yakima 125	Yakima Speedway	Yakima, Washington	Jack McCoy
September 10	Portland 200	Portland Speedway	Portland, Oregon	Hershel McGriff
September 16	Oly 250	Ascot Park	Gardena, California	Dick Bown
October 1	Sacramento 100	West Capitol Raceway	Sacramento, California	Ray Elder
October 22	Sierra Mesa 200	Sierra Mesa National Raceway	Marysville, California	Jack McCoy

== Full Drivers' Championship ==
(key) Bold – Pole position awarded by time. Italics – Pole position set by owner's points. * – Most laps led. † – Ineligible for West Series points

Pos	Driver	RSD	ONT	SJS	S99	SMN	TCR	YAK	EVG	RSD	MED	POR	IFS	MER	SPS	LSP	WSP	SKA	RAS	CRS	OSS	SGS	CSP	BKS	EVG	USP	YAK	POR	ASP	WCR	SMN	Pts
1	Ray Elder	4	5	10	**6**	1	3	2	1*	1	2	5	5	**1***	4	4	**6**	2*	4	**12***	**12**	**13**	4	6	1*	**1***	8	**6**	7	1*	2	3108.5
2	Hershel McGriff	5	6	17	2	**8**	**6***	**1***	17	12	**1***	**1***	**1**	2	**2**	**1***	2	1	**1***	1	1*	1*	**2**	**1***	**22**	4	4	1*	8	2	**3**	2742
3	Dick Bown	13	18	2	1*	2*	2	10	3	13	5	2	9	4	3	10	1*	5	2	2	3	2	3	21	17	18	**16***	7	1*	3	6	2665
4	Jack McCoy	36	12	**1***	3	16	1	7	**14**	38	14	3	2	3	1*	15	15	17	7	4	4	19	1*	4	2	15	1	2	2	4	1*	2434
5	John Soares Jr.	11	13	5	11	13	13	14	11	35	13	10	8	14	10	16	4	9	8	17	22	17	9	8	16	14	23	15	4	11	21	2324.75
6	Carl Adams		30	7	7		5	4	2	7	6	6	15	10	8	8	13	15	13	6	6	8	7	9	15	6	11	11	11	6	4	2289.25
7	Chuck Bown	32	33	3	4	4	19	5	22	14	11	17	6	5	6	7	14	3	5	3	20	20	10	17	4	3	10	20	26	**20**	12	2200
8	J. C. Danielsen	30	19		9		7	9	12	DNQ		13	12		9	5	9	**4**	9	7	7	11	5	10	8	13	6	16	**23**	7	7	2178.75
9	Dick Kranzler	23	37	12	21	5	22	6	7	16	12	14	14	13	23	13	10	19		20	24	14	17	13	11	8	12	14	10	10	14	2075.75
10	Ron Gautsche	35	35	6	22	22	14	18		DNQ	7	9	13	11	13	12	5	8	6	8		9	14	11	5	10	15	9	17	12	9	2074
11	Bill Butts	DNQ	15	26	20	10	20	15	21	20	3	19	4	8	15	3	19	14	3	23	15	16	6	22	DNQ	2	3	5	3	18	13	1897
12	Sonny Easley				14	3	24	3	4	31	4	15	17	7	19		3	16	10	13	2	4	21	2	7	9	9	18	15	5	5	1798.75
13	Bob Kauf	DNQ	29	19	16	7				39										15	5	18	11	5	10	5	21	10	21			1165.5
14	Markey James	DNQ	24	9	24	18				40										5	13	7		12	21	19	14	17	5	15		1165
15	Johnny Anderson	19	17	18	8	24	23			27										16	11	6	13	16	20	21						1139.75
16	Carl Joiner	12	DNQ		5		11	20	6	5	8	4		6	18										25		QL	3		8		1018
17	Don Noel	16	48	4		17				DNQ			10		5	11	21	13	12			5							6	19		999.5
18	Kevin Terris	6	22							17		12			17	17	7	10														856.5
19	Frank James	25	DNQ			12			5	9													12	3	13	17	13		16			828.5
20	Jack Jeffery						4	22	8			7	3		7	2	16	12							23	7						759.5
21	Ernie Stierly						8	11	10		10		7	9											6		7	13				706
22	Ed Brown			16	18		10	12	9		9	8			21		12	20														639.5
23	Ron McKenna			13	13	9	15	13	13											10		22									16	584
24	Bob England	DNQ	DNQ	25		14					16	16			14	14							15	15	14	16	25	12			15	509.25
25	Jimmy Insolo		DNQ							19										21	8	3	8	18	30	22		21	24			481.75
26	Johnny Steele	DNQ	DNQ	23							15	20							15						27	23	18	19		16	8	457.25
27	Paul Dorrity	33	DNQ	21	12	6				18																					17	415.5
28	Chuck Wahl																					15		7	9				9	9	11	410
29	Sam Stanley	DNQ	DNQ							34										18	18	10		23	24				13			378.75
30	Ralph Arnold								15				11		12	19		7							29							356.25
31	Don Graham		DNQ	14																			16						12	14	10	356
32	Les Loeser Jr.		34	24	23	15																										349.75
33	Jack Simpson												18		16	18	18	11					20	24								340.75
34	Jackie Kuper											18			20	6	11	6							12							325.75
35	Sam Rose						9	8					20				8	18														303.35
	Jim Whitt																												25			306
	Roger Parr	DNQ			19	23														9	17	21							22			303.25
	Cliff Garner		16																													301
	Pete Torres																			14		DNQ		14					14	21	20	265.25
	John Hren	DNQ								29										22	10	23										240.25
	Tru Cheek	DNQ	DNQ							36												12	19	20					18			231.75
	Glenn Francis		DNQ		17	21															23	DNQ	22	DNQ					19			220.75
	Ivan Baldwin	20	DNQ																													202
	Larry Esau	24	DNQ																													202
	Vic Irvan			11	15																								20			201.75
	Dave Alonzo			8	10	19																										196.5
	George Wiltshire		DNQ	15			18	19	20																							192.25
	Don Simkins																				14			19	19							180.75
	Sam Fairchild						21	16	16															DNQ								162.5
	Donnie Allison																									12	19	8				161.75
	Pat Mintey																			11	19	24										157.5
	Gene Romero		39																													155
	Harry Jefferson	DNQ	DNQ				16																		3		2	4				153.5
	Chuck Bigelow																								18		5					153.5
	Don Hall								19			11				20									26							134.75
	Dave Cooper								18							9																130.5
	Ray Johnstone									26																						127.5
	Larry Snodderly												19													11	17					122.75
	Wally Dunham														11											20						122.75
	Willie McNeal	DNQ			DNQ															19	21	DNQ	24	DNQ			24					118
	Harry Schilling		DNQ			11	17																									115.5
	Dale Lee		DNQ				12	21																								107.5
	Clem Proctor									30																						88.25
	Frank Burnett		DNQ																				23							17	18	87.75
	T. B. Smallwood			22		20																										83.5
	Dick Barton												16													24						82.75
	Chuck Hetrick		DNQ																		9								DNQ			78
	Dick Guldstrand									32																						73
	Jim McMillan															21	20															70.25
	Jack Roberts																				16											68.75
	Phil Pedlar		DNQ	20																												56.25
	Bill Osborne	DNQ	46																													55
	Tony Heckart							17																								53.5
	Larry Pries																													13		52.25
	Gus Stanfield																17															49
	Bill O'Neil																		14													48
	Clint Hutchins		DNQ							DNQ																					19	36.5
	Dave Hall														22																	32.5
	Perry Cottingham		DNQ																			DNQ							27			29
	Bruce Kratt																			24		DNQ		DNQ					DNQ			27.25
	Robert Banuelos																					DNQ							28			25.5
	Jim Ruff												21	15																		
	Louis Williams																								28		22					
	Jim Walker																		11													
	Bill Crow													12																		
	Fred Ade																						18									
	Bill Amick																										20					
	D. K. Ulrich	DNQ	DNQ							DNQ																						
	Dan Geiger	DNQ	DNQ							DNQ																						
	John Lyons	DNQ	DNQ																													
	Gene Riniker	DNQ	DNQ																													
	Jerry Oliver		DNQ																			DNQ										
	Roger Mears	DNQ																														
	Patrick McIntyre	DNQ																														
	Pete Halsmer	DNQ																														
	Ray Wulfenstein	DNQ																														
	Bill Simpson	DNQ																														
	Bobby Mausgrover		DNQ																													
	Tommy Gale		DNQ																													
	Emiliano Zapata		DNQ																													
	John Sears		DNQ																													
	Doc Faustina		DNQ																													
	Neil Castles		DNQ																													
	Charlie Glotzbach		DNQ																													
	Ed Negre		DNQ																													
	Steve Pfeifer		DNQ																													
	Arnie Krueger		DNQ																													
	Nels Miller		DNQ																													
	Jim Gilliam		DNQ																													
	Jabe Thomas		DNQ																													
	Johnny Halford		DNQ																													
	Wendell Scott		DNQ																													
	Bub Strickler		DNQ																													
	Don Tarr		DNQ																													
	Bill Seifert		DNQ																													
	John Fairchild		DNQ																													
	Jerry Barnett		DNQ																													
	Ken Shoemaker		DNQ																													
	Bill Shirey		DNQ																													
	Marion Collins		DNQ																													
	Joe Frasson		DNQ																													
	Dick May		DNQ																													
	Allen Jennings		DNQ																													
	Ron Keselowski		DNQ																													
	Mike Saint		DNQ																													
	Les Covey		DNQ																													
	Bill Dennis		DNQ																													
	Richard D. Brown		DNQ																													
	Verlin Eaker		DNQ																													
	Larry Smith		DNQ																													
	Richard Childress		DNQ																													
	Pat Fay		DNQ																													
	Bob Earnshaw																							DNQ								
	Bob Clough																												DNQ			
	Ron Rea																												QL			

== See also ==
- 1972 NASCAR Winston Cup Series
- 1972 NASCAR Grand National East Series
