= John Borneman =

American racing driver (born 1949)

- Born: April 19, 1949 (age 77); El Cajon, California, U.S.

NASCAR Cup Series career
- 8 races run over 5 years
- Best finish: 62nd (1978)
- First race: 1977 Los Angeles Times 500 (Ontario)
- Last race: 1981 Winston Western 500 (Riverside)
Wins	Top tens	Poles
0	0	0

NASCAR FedEx Freight Truck Series career
- 2 races run over 1 year
- Best finish: 73rd (1995)
- First race: 1995 Skoal Bandit Copper World Classic (Phoenix)
- Last race: 1995 GM Goodwrench / Delco Battery 200 (Phoenix)
Wins	Top tens	Poles
0	0	0

ARCA Menards Series West career
- 55 races run over 7 years
- Best finish: 6th (1978)
- First race: 1977 Winston Monterey 100 (Laguna Seca)
- Last race: 2003 Coors Light 200 Presented by NAPA (Evergreen)
- First win: 1978 Winston Evergreen 100 (Evergreen)
Wins	Top tens	Poles
1	24	1
- Statistics up to date as of May 29, 2026.

John Borneman Jr. (born April 19, 1949) is an American former professional stock car racing driver who has previously competed in the NASCAR Winston Cup Series, the NASCAR SuperTruck Series and the NASCAR Winston West Series. He is the father of fellow racing driver Johnny Borneman III, who has competed in the West Series and Truck Series, as well as the NASCAR Nationwide Series.

Borneman has also competed in the NASCAR Advance Auto Parts Weekly Series at Cajon Speedway.

== Motorsports career results ==
=== NASCAR ===
(key) (Bold - Pole position awarded by qualifying time. Italics - Pole position earned by points standings or practice time. * – Most laps led.)

==== Winston Cup Series ====
NASCAR Winston Cup Series results
Year	Team	No.	Make	1	2	3	4	5	6	7	8	9	10	11	12	13	14	15	16	17	18	19	20	21	22	23	24	25	26	27	28	29	30	31	NWCC	Pts	Ref
1977	Arthur Godfrey	81	Chevy	RSD	DAY	RCH	CAR	ATL	NWS	DAR	BRI	MAR	TAL	NSV	DOV	CLT	RSD	MCH	DAY	NSV	POC	TAL	MCH	BRI	DAR	RCH	DOV	MAR	NWS	CLT	CAR	ATL	ONT; 28		97th	79	
1978	Arthur Godfrey	81	Chevy	RSD; 27	DAY	RCH	CAR	ATL	BRI	DAR	NWS	MAR	TAL	DOV	CLT	NSV																			62nd	264	
1978	John Borneman	81	Chevy														RSD; 23	MCH	DAY	NSV	POC	TAL	MCH	BRI	DAR	RCH	DOV	MAR	NWS	CLT	CAR	ATL	ONT; 25		62nd	264	
1979	John Borneman	81	Chevy	RSD; QL^{†}	DAY	CAR	RCH	ATL	NWS	BRI	DAR	MAR	TAL	NSV	DOV	CLT	TWS	RSD; 20	MCH	DAY	NSV	POC	TAL	MCH	BRI	DAR	RCH	DOV	MAR	CLT	NWS	CAR	ATL	ONT	99th	103	
1980	John Borneman	81	Chevy	RSD; 31	DAY	RCH	CAR	ATL	BRI	DAR	NWS	MAR	TAL	NSV	DOV	CLT	TWS	RSD; 34	MCH	DAY	NSV	POC	TAL	MCH	BRI	DAR	RCH	DOV	NWS	MAR	CLT	CAR	ATL	ONT	81st	131	
1981	John Borneman	81	Chevy	RSD; 12	DAY	RCH	CAR	ATL	BRI	NWS	DAR	MAR	TAL	NSV	DOV	CLT	TWS	RSD	MCH	DAY	NSV	POC	TAL	MCH	BRI	DAR	RCH	DOV	MAR	NWS	CLT	CAR	ATL	RSD	72nd	127	
^{†} - Qualified but replaced by Jim Robinson

==== SuperTruck Series ====
NASCAR SuperTruck Series results
Year	Team	No.	Make	1	2	3	4	5	6	7	8	9	10	11	12	13	14	15	16	17	18	19	20	NCTC	Pts	Ref
1995	John Borneman	8	Chevy	PHO; 33	TUS	SGS	MMR	POR	EVG	I70	LVL	BRI	MLW	CNS	HPT	IRP	FLM	RCH	MAR	NWS	SON	MMR		73rd	140	
1995	Ultra Motorsports	08	Ford																				PHO; 29	73rd	140	
