= Don Waterman =

American racing driver (born 1950)

- Born: April 14, 1950 (age 76); Portland, Oregon, U.S.

NASCAR Cup Series career
- 9 races run over 4 years
- Best finish: 49th (1981)
- First race: 1980 Warner W. Hodgdon 400 (Riverside)
- Last race: 1983 Winston Western 500 (Riverside)
Wins	Top tens	Poles
0	1	0

ARCA Menards Series West career
- 66 races run over 12 years
- Best finish: 4th (1981)
- First race: 1975 Coca-Cola 150 (Portland)
- Last race: 1991 Winston 200 (Portland)
Wins	Top tens	Poles
0	38	1
- Statistics up to date as of June 1, 2025.

Don Waterman (born April 14, 1950) is an American former professional stock car racing driver whose NASCAR Winston Cup Series career spanned from 1980 to 1983.

== Career ==
The primary vehicle for Waterman was the self-owned #38 St. John's Auto Parts Buick.

Only three races were spent inside an Oldsmobile machine. His only top-ten finish came at the January running of the 1981 Winston Western 500. Waterman has led only two laps out of 896 - the equivalent to 2,352.2 miles (3,785.5 km). After starting an average of 26th place and finishing an average of twentieth, Waterman has earned a total career savings of $19,285 ($62,339.58 when adjusted for inflation). DNFs made up about 44% of Waterman's career. He raced in eight road courses and only one intermediate oval track.

Waterman's final race in motorsports came on June 30, 1991, in a NASCAR Winston West Series race at Portland Speedway. He improved on his eleventh place start with a seventh-place finish and received prize winnings of $1,100 after 198 laps of racing ($2,600.17 when adjusted for inflation).
