= West Series races at Evergreen =

ARCA Menards Series West races at Evergreen Speedway

ARCA Menards Series West races at Evergreen Speedway
ARCA Menards Series West
- Venue: Evergreen Speedway
- Location: Monroe, Washington
- First race: 1964
- Last race: 2023
- Distance: 48.13 mi (77.458 km) (1978); 62.5 mi (100.584 km) (1965, 1967–1970, 1979); 64.6 mi (103.964 km) (2020); 93.75 mi (150.876 km) (1969, 1975–1977, 1979, 2023); 96.9 mi (155.945 km) (2008, 2012–2016, 2019); 99.48 mi (160.098 km) (2017); 100 mi (160.934 km) (1964); 113.05 mi (181.936 km) (2018); 125 mi (201.168 km) (1964, 1971–1976, 1980–1984); 129.2 mi (207.927 km) (1996–2005, 2011); 156.25 mi (251.460 km) (1972); 161.5 mi (259.909 km) (2006); 193.8 mi (311.891 km) (1991, 2007); 323 mi (519.818 km) (1985–1993)
- Laps: 77 (1978); 100 (1965, 1967–1970, 1979, 2020); 150 (1969, 1975–1977, 1979, 2008, 2012–2016, 2019, 2022–2023); 154 (2017); 160 (1964); 175 (2018); 200 (1964, 1971–1976, 1980–1984, 1996–2005, 2011); 250 (1972, 2006); 300 (1991, 2007); 500 (1985–1993)
- Previous names: First races Evergreen 200 (1964, 1971–1972, 1974, 1981, 2011); Evergreen 100 (1965); No name (1967–1968, 1970); Independence Day 100 (1969); Ranier 200 at Evergreen (1973); Evergreen 150 (1975); Winston Evergreen 150 (1976–1977); Winston Evergreen 100 (1978); Reed Cam 150 (1979); Reed Cams 200 (1980); Winston Evergreen 200 (1982–1983); Evergreen Winston 200 (1984); Winston Washington 500 (1985, 1987); Peterbilt Winston Washington 500 (1986); Motorcraft 500 (1987–1990); Winston 300 (1991); Motorcraft Fast Lube 500 (1992); Coors Light 500 by Puget Sound Ford Dealers (1993); Winston 200 Presented by Alley Chevrolet (1996); Coors Light 200 (1997–1998, 2000, 2004); Coors Light 200 Pres. by Albertson's (1999); Coors Light 200 Pres. by NAPA & Albertson's (2001–2002); Coors Light 200 Presented by NAPA (2003); Coors Light 200 by NAPA & Creekside-Mountain (2005); NAPA 250 Presented by AAA (2006); NAPA 300 (2007); Toyota / Concept Race Cars & Parts 150 (2008); NAPA Auto Parts 150 (2012, 2015–2017, 2019); NAPA Auto Parts 150 Pres. by Toyota (2013); NAPA Auto Parts / Toyota 150 (2014); NAPA 175 (2018); ENEOS / NAPA Auto Parts 100 (2020); NAPA Auto Parts ARCA West 150 (2022); NAPA Auto Parts ARCA 150 (2023); Second races No name (1964, 1968–1969); Ranier Beer 250 (1972); Monroe 200 (1975); Winston Evergreen 200 (1976); Evergreen Winston 100 (1979); Motorcraft 500 (1991)
- Most wins (driver): Jack McCoy, Ray Elder (5)
- Most wins (team): Bill McAnally Racing (7)
- Most wins (manufacturer): Ford (18)

The ARCA Menards Series West, formerly known by other names, most notably the NASCAR Winston West Series, has held several races at Evergreen Speedway in Monroe, Washington. The track hosted two races in 1964, 1968, 1969, 1972, 1975, 1976, 1979, and 1991, and one race in 46 other seasons.

== History ==
The West Series first visited Evergreen in 1964, when Dick Bown drove his 1964 Plymouth to the win in a 200-lap race in April and Bill Amick won a 160-lap race in July driving a 1964 Mercury. The series continued to visit the track most years between 1965 and 2023, with drivers such as Jack McCoy, Scotty Cain, Ray Elder, Harry Jefferson, Roy Smith, Derrike Cope, Geoffrey Bodine, Brendan Gaughan, and Trevor Huddleston securing victories at the track. 59 races were run at the track before the series became part of the ARCA Menards Series platform, with three more held between 2020 and 2023.

== Past winners ==
Year	Date	No.	Driver	Team	Manufacturer	Race Distance		Race Time	Average Speed (mph)	Report	Ref
Year	Date	No.	Driver	Team	Manufacturer	Laps	Miles (km)	Race Time	Average Speed (mph)	Report	Ref
1964	April 19	61N	Dick Bown	Bown Racing	Plymouth	200	125 (201.17)			Report	
1964	July 12	9N	Bill Amick	Dick Niles	Mercury	160	100 (160.93)			Report	
1965	April 25	9N	Bill Amick (2)	Dick Niles (2)	Mercury (2)	100	62.5 (100.58)			Report	
1966	Not held										
1967	July 30	7	Jack McCoy	Charles Bell	Dodge	100	62.5 (100.58)			Report	
1968	July 4	7	Jack McCoy (2)	Charles Bell (2)	Dodge (2)	100	62.5 (100.58)	0:55:23	67.700	Report	
1968	September 2	7	Jack McCoy (3)	Charles Bell (3)	Dodge (3)	100	62.5 (100.58)			Report	
1969	July 4	45	Scotty Cain	Bill Clinton	Ford	100	62.5 (100.58)			Report	
1969	September 1	7	Jack McCoy (4)	Charles Bell (4)	Dodge (4)	150	93.75 (150.88)			Report	
1970	July 4	02	Dick Bown (2)	Bown Racing (2)	Plymouth (2)	100	62.5 (100.58)	1:04:33	58.094	Report	
1971	September 6	96	Ray Elder	Elder Racing	Dodge (5)	200	125 (201.17)	1:43:32	72.440	Report	
1972	May 28	96	Ray Elder (2)	Elder Racing (2)	Dodge (6)	200	125 (201.17)	1:45:00	71.428	Report	
1972	September 3	96	Ray Elder (3)	Elder Racing (3)	Dodge (7)	250	156.25 (251.46)	1:56:32	80.449	Report	
1973	September 2	7	Jack McCoy (5)	Ernie Conn	Dodge (8)	200	125 (201.17)	1:34:33	79.323	Report	
1974	September 1	97	Harry Jefferson	Jefferson Racing	Ford (2)	200	125 (201.17)	1:40:00	75.000	Report	
1975	July 6	96	Ray Elder (4)	Elder Racing (4)	Dodge (8)	150	93.75 (150.88)	1:10:15	80.071	Report	
1975	August 31	96	Ray Elder (5)	Elder Racing (5)	Dodge (9)	200	125 (201.17)	1:42:31	73.158	Report	
1976	June 27	01	Chuck Bown	Gerald Craker	Chevrolet	150	93.75 (150.88)	1:15:30	74.463	Report	
1976	September 6	04	Neal Newberry	Neal Newberry	Dodge (10)	200	125 (201.17)	1:37:27	69.266	Report	
1977	June 26	95	Harry Jefferson (2)	Jefferson Racing (2)	Mercury (3)	150	93.75 (150.88)	1:11:17	78.910	Report	
1978	July 3	81	John Borneman	Arthur Godfrey	Pontiac	77*	48.13 (77.45)	0:48:35	59.433	Report	
1979	June 24	04	Neal Newberry (2)	Gary Henkel	Plymouth (3)	150	93.75 (150.88)	1:16:37	73.265	Report	
1979	August 26	7	Ron Eaton	Eaton Racing	Pontiac (2)	100	62.5 (100.58)	0:50:34	74.160	Report	
1980	June 29	7	Ron Eaton (2)	Eaton Racing (2)	Pontiac (3)	200	125 (201.17)	1:36:12	77.959	Report	
1981	July 12	11	Roy Smith	Robert Beadle	Buick	200	125 (201.17)	1:29:56	83.395	Report	
1982	August 1	7	Ron Eaton (3)	Eaton Racing (3)	Buick (2)	200	125 (201.17)	1:33:41	80.057	Report	
1983	July 31	78	Jim Robinson	Lois Williams	Oldsmobile	200	125 (201.17)	1:35:27	78.575	Report	
1984	July 29	78	Jim Robinson (2)	Lois Williams (2)	Oldsmobile (2)	200	125 (201.17)	1:35:01	78.934	Report	
1985	August 18	07	Derrike Cope	George Jefferson	Ford (3)	500	323 (519.82)	4:25:05	73.109	Report	
1986	July 13	26	Chad Little	George Jeferson (2)	Ford (4)	500	323 (519.82)	3:55:04	82.386	Report	
1987	July 12	9	Bill Elliott	Melling Racing	Ford (5)	500	323 (519.82)	4:05:12	79.038	Report	
1988	July 17	19	Chad Little (2)	George Jefferson / Fred Stoke	Ford (6)	500	323 (519.82)	4:12:07	76.869	Report	
1989	July 17	90	Chad Little (3)	George Jefferson / Fred Stoke (2)	Ford (7)	500	323 (519.82)	4:20:57	74.272	Report	
1990	July 15	75	Bill Sedgwick	Spears Motorsports	Chevrolet (2)	500	323 (519.82)	4:11:34	77.037	Report	
1991	May 4	23	Mike Chase	Freymiller Racing	Buick (3)	300	193.8 (311.89)	2:40:52	72.283	Report	
1991	July 14	11	Geoffrey Bodine	Junior Johnson & Associates	Ford (8)	500	323 (519.82)	5:12:52	68.356	Report	
1992	July 12	75	Bill Sedgwick (2)	Spears Motorsports (2)	Chevrolet (3)	500	323 (519.82)	4:20:43	74.334	Report	
1993	June 27	37	Rick Carelli	Chesrown Racing	Chevrolet (4)	500	323 (519.82)	4:24:59	73.137	Report	
1994–1995	Not held										
1996	June 29	38	Butch Gilliland	Stroppe Motorsports	Ford (9)	200	129.2 (207.93)	1:58:59	65.151	Report	
1997	July 5	07	Sean Woodside	Golden West Motorsports	Pontiac (4)	200	129.2 (207.93)	1:51:47	69.348	Report	
1998	August 15	1	Butch Gilliland (2)	Hilton Racing	Ford (10)	200	129.2 (207.93)	1:44:45	74.005	Report	
1999	July 18	85	Kevin Richards	Monaco Enterprises	Chevrolet (5)	200	129.2 (207.93)	1:44:47	73.981	Report	
2000	July 16	16	Brendan Gaughan	Bill McAnally Racing	Chevrolet (6)	200	129.2 (207.93)	1:48:03	71.745	Report	
2001	July 30	16	Brendan Gaughan (2)	Bill McAnally Racing (2)	Chevrolet (7)	200	129.2 (207.93)	1:47:33	72.078	Report	
2002	June 29	32	Eric Norris	Matt Stowe	Ford (11)	200	129.2 (207.93)	1:50:57	69.869	Report	
2003	June 28	3	Mark Reed	Christina Adair	Pontiac (5)	200	129.2 (207.93)	1:31:51	84.398	Report	
2004	July 17	16	Austin Cameron	Bill McAnally Racing (3)	Chevrolet (8)	200	129.2 (207.93)	1:56:03	66.799	Report	
2005	July 30	9	Mike Duncan	MB Duncan Motorsports	Chevrolet (9)	200	129.2 (207.93)	1:52:48	68.085	Report	
2006	July 29	8	Johnny Borneman III	Borneman Motorsports	Ford (12)	250	161.5 (259.91)	2:14:02	71.624	Report	
2007	August 4	16	Brian Ickler	Bill McAnally Racing (4)	Chevrolet (10)	300	193.8 (311.89)	2:41:30	72.000	Report	
2008	July 26	46	Jeff Barkshire	Robert Barkshire	Dodge (11)	150	96.9 (155.95)	1:11:30	81.315	Report	
2009–2010	Not held										
2011	July 10	26	Greg Pursley	Gene Price Motorsports	Ford (13)	200	129.2 (207.93)	1:43:26	74.947	Report	
2012	July 14	20	Eric Holmes	Bill McAnally Racing (5)	Toyota	150	96.9 (155.95)	1:30:02	64.576	Report	
2013	August 17	9	Dylan Lupton	Sunrise Ford Racing	Ford (14)	150	96.9 (155.95)	1:19:10	73.440	Report	
2014	August 16	17	David Mayhew	Steve McGowan Motorsports	Chevrolet (11)	150	96.9 (155.95)	1:27:55	65.517	Report	
2015	August 15	17	David Mayhew (2)	Steve McGowan Motorsports (2)	Chevrolet (12)	150	96.9 (155.95)	1:16:56	75.572	Report	
2016	August 13	16	Todd Gilliland	Bill McAnally Racing (6)	Toyota (2)	150	96.9 (155.95)	1:28:33	65.658	Report	
2017	August 12	99	Chris Eggleston	Bill McAnally Racing (7)	Toyota (3)	154*	99.48 (160.10)	1:19:24	75.177	Report	
2018	August 11	6	Derek Thorn	Sunrise Ford Racing (2)	Ford (15)	175	113.05 (181.94)	1:51:10	61.016	Report	
2019	August 17	9	Trevor Huddleston	Sunrise Ford Racing (3)	Ford (16)	150	96.9 (155.95)	1:18:16	71.870	Report	
2020	August 7	9	Blaine Perkins	Sunrise Ford Racing (4)	Ford (17)	100	64.6 (103.96)	0:48:14	77.747	Report	
2021	Not held										
2022	August 20	9	Tanner Reif	Sunrise Ford Racing (5)	Ford (18)	150	96.9 (155.95)	1:24:08	66.858	Report	
2023	August 19	15	Sean Hingorani	Venturini Motorsports	Toyota (4)	150	93.75 (150.88)	1:11:07	79.095	Report	

Notes

- 1977: Race shortened from 100 to 77 laps due to rain.
- 2017: Race extended from 150 to 154 laps due to overtime.

=== Manufacturer wins ===
# Wins	Make	Years Won
18	(United States) Ford	1969, 1974, 1985, 1986, 1987, 1988, 1989, 1991, 1996, 1998, 2002, 2006, 2011, 2013, 2018, 2019, 2020, 2022
12	(United States) Chevrolet	1976, 1990, 1992, 1993, 1999, 2000, 2001, 2004, 2005, 2007, 2014, 2015
11	(United States) Dodge	1967, 1968, 1969, 1971, 1972, 1973, 1975, 1976, 2008
5	(United States) Pontiac	1978, 1979, 1980, 1997, 2003
4	(Japan) Toyota	2012, 2016, 2017, 2023
3	(United States) Plymouth	1964, 1970, 1979
3	(United States) Buick	1981, 1982, 1991
2	(United States) Oldsmobile	1983, 1984
