= Rick O'Dell =

Canadian racing driver (born 1948)

Rick O'Dell (born October 26, 1948, in Victoria, British Columbia) is a former NASCAR driver. He made one Winston Cup start in the 1981 Warner W. Hodgdon 400 at Riverside International Raceway, where he finished sixteenth.

O'Dell also made 20 starts in the Winston West series from 1978 to 1981.

== See also ==
- List of Canadian NASCAR drivers
