= 1979 Southern 500 =

Auto race held at Darlington Raceway in 1979

Coordinates: 34°17′50.5″N 79°54′18.4″W

Race details
- Race 23 of 31 in the 1979 NASCAR Winston Cup Series season
- 1979 Southern 500 program cover
- Date: September 3, 1979
- Official name: Southern 500
- Location: Darlington Raceway, Darlington, South Carolina
- Course: Permanent racing facility
- Course length: 1.366 miles (2.198 km)
- Distance: 367 laps, 501.3 mi (806.7 km)
- Weather: Very hot with temperatures of 88.9 °F (31.6 °C); with wind speeds of 9.9 miles per hour (15.9 km/h)
- Average speed: 126.259 miles per hour (203.194 km/h)

Pole position
Driver	Bobby Allison	Bud Moore Engineering

Most laps led
Driver	Darrell Waltrip	DiGard Motorsports
- Laps: 165

Winner
No. 2	David Pearson	Osterlund Motorsports

Television in the United States
- Network: ABC
- Announcers: Bill Flemming; Jackie Stewart

Radio in the United States
- Radio: Universal Radio Network
- Booth announcers: Dick Jones and Dave Rogers
- Turn announcers: Turns 1/2 and Backstreatch: Hill Overton; Pit Reporter: Bobby Johns

The 1979 Southern 500, the 30th running of the event, was a NASCAR Winston Cup Series race that took place on September 3, 1979, at Darlington Raceway in Darlington, South Carolina.

This would be the last race without Dale Earnhardt until 2001 Dura Lube 400, and the last in not featuring the name Earnhardt on the starting grid until the 2012 Bank of America 500.

== Background ==
Darlington Raceway, nicknamed by many NASCAR fans and drivers as "The Lady in Black" or "The Track Too Tough to Tame" and advertised as a "NASCAR Tradition", is a race track built for NASCAR racing located near Darlington, South Carolina. It is of a unique, somewhat egg-shaped design, an oval with the ends of very different configurations, a condition which supposedly arose from the proximity of one end of the track to a minnow pond the owner refused to relocate. This situation makes it very challenging for the crews to set up their cars' handling in a way that will be effective at both ends.

The track is a four-turn 1.366 miles (2.198 km) oval. The track's first two turns are banked at twenty-five degrees, while the final two turns are banked two degrees lower at twenty-three degrees. The front stretch (the location of the finish line) and the back stretch are banked at six degrees. Darlington Raceway can seat up to 60,000 people.

Darlington has something of a legendary quality among drivers and older fans; this is probably due to its long track length relative to other NASCAR speedways of its era and hence the first venue where many of them became cognizant of the truly high speeds that stock cars could achieve on a long track. The track allegedly earned the moniker The Lady in Black because the night before the race the track maintenance crew would cover the entire track with fresh asphalt sealant, in the early years of the speedway, thus making the racing surface dark black. Darlington is also known as "The Track Too Tough to Tame" because drivers can run lap after lap without a problem and then bounce off of the wall the following lap. Racers will frequently explain that they have to race the racetrack, not their competition. Drivers hitting the wall are considered to have received their "Darlington Stripe" thanks to the missing paint on the right side of the car.

== Race report ==
Three hundred and sixty seven laps were completed on a spanning 1.366 miles (2.198 km) for a grand total of 501.3 miles (806.8 km). The total time of the race was three hours, fifty-eight minutes, and fourteen seconds. Speeds were: 126.259 miles per hour (203.194 km/h) for the race average and 154.88 miles per hour (249.26 km/h) for the pole position speed. There were nine cautions for fifty-two laps.

David Pearson, who was in semi-retirement and had left the Wood Brothers after a disastrous pit stop at the Rebel 500 earlier that year, was driving for Rod Osterlund as a substitute for rookie contender Dale Earnhardt, injured at the Pocono race, defeated Bill Elliott by two laps and four seconds.

This was David Pearson's first win in a General Motors car since he won the 1961 Dixie 400 in a Pontiac and the first of just two for him at the wheel of a Chevrolet. Pearson's victory also marked the last of only nine starts for David Pearson in 1979. While he wasn't a familiar sight on the track this season the Silver Fox was still selected by fans as the Cup Series' Most Popular Driver at year's end. Ironically this was only time in Pearson's career he won that honor. This would be one of the final races in NASCAR history that a racing car without a visible sponsor won. In today's NASCAR, most drivers have a primary sponsor and a secondary sponsor due to the amount of money spent on racing components in a given season.

Sixty thousand people came to watch this live event.

Darrell Waltrip had controlled the race until late-race incidents that dropped him to 11th, which ended his shot at sweeping the track's two races. Waltrip would not be considered a good competitor at Darlington for most of his career, despite four Rebel 500 wins (1977, 1979, 1981 and 1984). He would typically dominate the early portions of the race during the 1970s before an incident would force him out of contention for the win. Those late-race incidents would later cause Waltrip to lose the 1979 championship to Richard Petty. The top prize of the race was $29,925 ($132,748.45 when considering inflation).

The participants of this race were all American-born males. With the lone Chrysler of Ed Negre and H.B. Bailey's lone Pontiac, this was the last Cup race with eight car makes in the starting lineup. Ed Negre would make his final appearance here while Billy Smith would make his only professional stock car appearance. Notable crew chiefs who participated in the race were Buddy Parrott, Tex Powell, Joey Arrington, Kirk Shelmerdine, Darrell Bryant, Dale Inman, Harry Hyde, and Jake Elder.

Hurricane David approached the East Coast of the United States during the course of the race. The storm had made landfall in Eastern Florida while the drivers were racing.

=== Qualifying ===
Grid	No.	Driver	Manufacturer	Owner
1	15	Bobby Allison	Ford	Bud Moore
2	1	Donnie Allison	Chevrolet	Hoss Ellington
3	88	Darrell Waltrip	Chevrolet	DiGard
4	43	Richard Petty	Chevrolet	Petty Enterprises
5	2	David Pearson	Chevrolet	Rod Osterlund
6	17	Bill Elliott	Mercury	George Elliott
7	47	Harry Gant	Chevrolet	Jack Beebe
8	05	Dick Brooks	Chevrolet	Nelson Malloch
9	21	Neil Bonnett	Mercury	Wood Brothers
10	28	Buddy Baker	Chevrolet	Harry Ranier

Withdrew from race: Jan Opperman (#96)

== Finishing order ==
Section reference:

1. David Pearson†
2. Bill Elliott
3. Terry Labonte
4. Buddy Baker†
5. Benny Parsons†
6. Dave Marcis
7. Dick Brooks†
8. Ricky Rudd
9. Richard Petty
10. Bobby Allison†
11. Darrell Waltrip
12. Harry Gant
13. D. K. Ulrich
14. Buddy Arrington†
15. Joe Millikan
16. Jimmy Means
17. Chuck Bown
18. J. D. McDuffie†
19. Cale Yarborough†
20. Ed Negre†
21. Tommy Gale†
22. Frank Warren†
23. Baxter Price
24. Ronnie Thomas
25. Lennie Pond†
26. Cecil Gordon†
27. H. B. Bailey*†
28. Jim Vandiver†
29. Richard Childress*
30. Jack Ingram*†
31. Donnie Allison*
32. Neil Bonnett*†
33. Billy Smith*
34. Dick May*†
35. Tighe Scott*
36. Coo Coo Marlin*†
37. Ralph Jones*
38. James Hylton*†
39. Earle Canavan*†
40. Ferrel Harris*†

† signifies that the driver is known to be deceased
* Driver failed to finish race

== Timeline ==
Section reference:

- Start of race: Donnie Allison had the pole position to begin the event.
- Lap 2: Ferrel Harris was black-flagged out of the race and into a last-place finish.
- Lap 17: An oil leak in Earle Canavan's vehicle managed to ruin his day on the track.
- Lap 27: Bobby Allison took over the lead from Donnie Allison.
- Lap 46: James Hylton's vehicle developed engine problems.
- Lap 56: Caution due to Harry Gant and Joe Millikan's accident; racing resumed on lap 62.
- Lap 63: Darrell Waltrip took over the lead from Bobby Allison.
- Lap 69: Caution due to Bobby Allison's accident; racing resumed on lap 72.
- Lap 83: Caution due to two cars spinning into each other; racing resumed on lap 88.
- Lap 84: Donnie Allison took over the lead from Darrell Waltrip.
- Lap 90: Caution due to a vehicle spinning out of control; racing resumed on lap 92.
- Lap 112: Coo Coo Marlin had engine problems which ending his hopes of winning the event.
- Lap 116: Caution due to a vehicle spinning out of control; racing resumed on lap 121.
- Lap 117: Bobby Allison took over the lead from Donnie Allison.
- Lap 118: Bill Elliott took over the lead from Bobby Allison.
- Lap 122: Donnie Allison took over the lead from Bill Elliott.
- Lap 133: Tighe Scott had a terminal crash; forcing him to leave the race prematurely.
- Lap 138: Darrell Waltrip took over the lead from Donnie Allison.
- Lap 142: Caution due to two cars spinning into each other; racing resumed on lap 149.
- Lap 143: Donnie Allison took over the lead from Darrell Waltrip.
- Lap 148: Dick May had a terminal crash; forcing him to exit the race.
- Lap 150: Darrell Waltrip took over the lead from Donnie Allison.
- Lap 160: Caution due to a vehicle spinning out of control; racing resumed on lap 165.
- Lap 161: Buddy Baker took over the lead from Darrell Waltrip.
- Lap 162: Bill Elliott took over the lead from Buddy Baker.
- Lap 164: Darrell Waltrip took over the Bill Elliott.
- Lap 166: Neil Bonnett took over the lead from Darrell Waltrip.
- Lap 168: Darrell Waltrip took over the lead from Neil Bonnett.
- Lap 179: Driveshaft issues managed to force Billy Smith out of the race.
- Lap 185: Steering issues managed to get the best of Neil Bonnett.
- Lap 196: Donnie Allison's engine would stop working properly; causing his early exit from the race.
- Lap 206: Jack Ingram's vehicle developed engine problems.
- Lap 224: Richard Childress' engine problem forced his early exit from the race.
- Lap 231: David Pearson took over the lead from Darrell Waltrip.
- Lap 235: Darrell Waltrip took over the lead from David Pearson.
- Lap 244: H.B. Bailey managed to overheat his vehicle; securing an unwanted early exit from the event.
- Lap 296: Caution due to Darrell Waltrip's accident; racing resumed on lap 303.
- Lap 298: David Pearson took over the lead from Darrell Waltrip and would dominate the remainder of the race.
- Lap 306: Caution due to a vehicle spinning out of control; racing resumed on lap 309.
- Finish: David Pearson was officially declared the winner of the event.

== Standings after the race ==
Pos	Driver	Points	Differential
1	Darrell Waltrip	3672	0
2	Richard Petty	3510	-162
3 ▲	Bobby Allison	3332	-340
4 ▼	Cale Yarborough	3324	-348
5	Benny Parsons	3152	-520
6	Joe Millikan	2987	-685
7	Richard Childress	2730	-942
8	J.D. McDuffie	2704	-968
9 ▲	Buddy Arrington	2657	-1015
10 ▲	Terry Labonte	2652	-1020

Preceded by 1979 Volunteer 500	NASCAR Winston Cup Series Season; 1979	Succeeded by 1979 Capital City 400
Preceded by 1978	Southern 500 races 1979	Succeeded by 1980
