= 1981 Winston Western 500 (January) =

Auto race held at Riverside International Raceway in 1981

Race details
- Race 1 of 30 in the 1981 NASCAR Winston Cup Series season
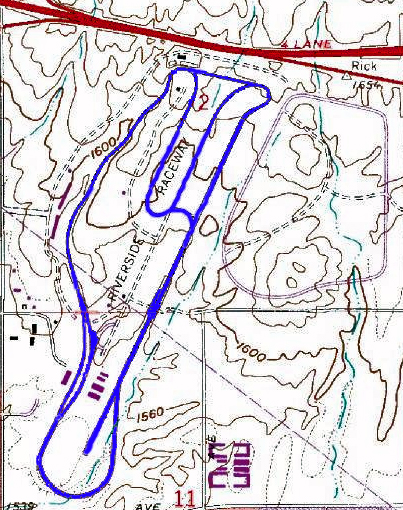
- Layout of Riverside International Raceway (1969–1988 version)
- Date: January 11, 1981
- Official name: Winston Western 500
- Location: Riverside International Raceway, Riverside, California
- Course: Permanent racing facility
- Course length: 2.700 miles (4.345 km)
- Distance: 119 laps, 311.8 mi (501.7 km)
- Weather: Temperatures of 75 °F (24 °C); wind speeds up to 15 miles per hour (24 km/h)
- Average speed: 95.263 miles per hour (153.311 km/h)
- Attendance: 35,000

Pole position
Driver	Darrell Waltrip	Junior Johnson & Associates

Most laps led
Driver	Bobby Allison	Ranier Racing
- Laps: 37

Winner
No. 28	Bobby Allison	Ranier Racing

Television in the United States
- Network: untelevised
- Announcers: none

The 1981 Winston Western 500 was a NASCAR Winston Cup Series race that took place on January 11, 1981, at Riverside International Raceway in Riverside, California.

This race would be the final race where 115-inch wheelbase cars were eligible to run; the field was a mix of older cars and 1981 105-inch wheelbase models. Dale Earnhardt drove a 1981 Pontiac while race winner Bobby Allison drove a 1977 Monte Carlo.

== Summary ==
There were 36 drivers on the grid; all of them were American-born except for Canadian Roy Smith. The last place finisher was Cecil Gordon in his Chevrolet due to engine problems on lap 2 out of 119. Bobby Allison defeated Terry Labonte in front of 35,000 spectators. There were 15 lead changes and six cautions for 31 laps; making the race last three hours and sixteen minutes in length. Darrell Waltrip would qualify for the pole position with a speed of 114.711 miles per hour (184.609 km/h) while the average race speed was 95.263 miles per hour (153.311 km/h). The other drivers in the top ten were: Dale Earnhardt, Richard Childress, Richard Petty, Jim Robinson, Jody Ridley, Elliott Forbes-Robinson, Buddy Arrington, and Don Waterman. Robinson was declared the winner of the West Series division of this combination race.

Notable crew chiefs in the race included Junie Donvaley, Jake Elder, Joey Arrington, Darrell Dieringer, Darrell Bryant, Dale Inman, Waddell Wilson, Bud Moore, and Kirk Shelmerdine.

Ricky Rudd would start his "Ironman" streak of being in the NASCAR Cup Series for 24 seasons without missing a single race. West Coast racer John Borneman, a registered West Series driver, finished 12th in this combination race, earning a third-place finish in the West Series standings under NASCAR's combination race policy. Though it would be his last Cup start, Borneman (whose son would later race at the national level) was primarily a regular at San Diego's Cajon Speedway. This was the final time in NASCAR history that a race would take place prior to the Daytona 500. Also, this race would be the last time that a car owned by a member of the Petty family would have Chevrolet as a manufacturer until the year 2018.

Road course ringer Bob Bondurant made his first Cup race. Harry Dinwiddie and Don Sprouse failed to qualify for the race.

== Standings after the race ==
Pos	Driver	Points	Differential
1	Bobby Allison	185	0
2	Terry Labonte	175	-10
3	Dale Earnhardt	165	-20
3	Richard Childress	165	-20
5	Richard Petty	160	-25
6	Jim Robinson	150	-35
7	Jody Ridley	146	-39
8	Elliott Forbes-Robinson	142	-43
9	Buddy Arrington	138	-47
10	Don Waterman	134	-51

Preceded by 1980 Los Angeles Times 500	NASCAR Winston Cup Series Season; 1980–81	Succeeded by 1981 Daytona 500

Preceded by 1980	Winston Western 500 races 1981	Succeeded by November 1981
