= Shasta Speedway =

Motorsports track in the United States

- Location: Anderson, California, United States
- Coordinates: 40°26′53.52″N 122°17′52.08″W
- Capacity: 3,000 seats
- Owner: The Shasta District Fair & Events Center
- Broke ground: Late 1940s (dirt oval), 1972 (asphalt oval)
- Opened: Late 1940s
- Major events: Current: ARCA Menards Series West; Bill Schmitt Memorial 173 (1967, 1976–1979, 1981–1985, 1992–1993, 2015, 2023–2024, 2026); Former: NASCAR Southwest Series (1986–1989, 2005–2006); NASCAR Northwest Series (1985)

Oval (2004–present)
- Surface: Asphalt
- Length: 0.375 mi (0.604 km)
- Turns: 4
- Race lap record: 0:16.397 ( (United States) Tyler Reif, Toyota Camry, 2024, ARCA Menards)

Oval (1972–2003)
- Surface: Asphalt
- Length: 0.333 mi (0.536 km)
- Turns: 4

Shasta Speedway is a 0.375 mi (0.604 km) asphalt oval race track located in Anderson, California, United States. The track was named after Shasta County, the county that Anderson, California and the speedway are located in. Shasta Speedway is currently being featured in the ARCA Menards Series West division of NASCAR.

== Divisions ==
Shasta Speedway currently holds events for super late models, legends, mini stocks, super modifieds, hornets, bombers, and monster trucks.

== History ==
The track was constructed in the late 1940s as a 0.375 mi (0.604 km) dirt track. In the early 1970s, the track was reconfigured into a 0.250 mi (0.402 km) dirt track. In 1972, the track was paved into a 0.333 mi (0.536 km) asphalt oval. In 2004, the track was reconfigured into the currently used 0.375 mi (0.604 km) asphalt oval.

The K&N West Series (now the ARCA Menards Series) debuted at the track in 1967 with Scotty Cain winning the first race. After 9 years of no activity, the track returned in 1976 and raced actively until 1985 before being dropped from the schedule.

The track is owned by the Shasta District Fair & Event Center which mainly focuses on renting out the four primary event buildings for boating shows, weddings, vintage markets, art shows, and other city events.

== See also ==
- Anderson, California
- Shasta County
