= 1980 Warner W. Hodgdon 400 =

Auto race held at Riverside International Raceway in 1980

Race details
- Race 15 of 31 in the 1980 NASCAR Winston Cup Series season
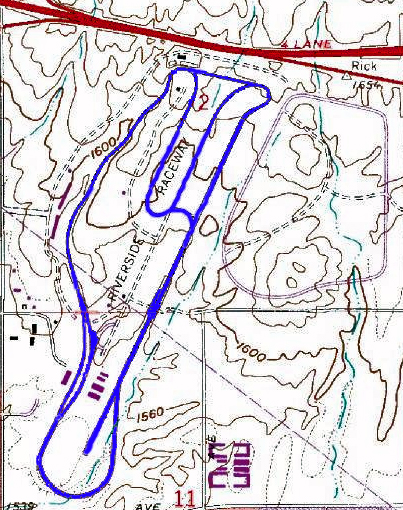
- Layout of Riverside International Raceway (1969–1988 version)
- Date: June 8, 1980
- Official name: Warner W. Hodgdon 400
- Location: Riverside International Raceway, Riverside, California
- Course: Permanent racing facility
- Course length: 2.700 miles (4.345 km)
- Distance: 119 laps, 211.8 mi (401.7 km)
- Weather: Very hot with temperatures of 87.1 °F (30.6 °C); wind speeds of 7 miles per hour (11 km/h)
- Average speed: 101.846 mph (163.905 km/h)
- Attendance: 18,000

Pole position
Driver	Cale Yarbrough	Junior Johnson

Most laps led
Driver	Darrell Waltrip/Bobby Allison (tied)	DiGard/Bud Moore
- Laps: 23

Winner
No. 88	Darrell Waltrip	DiGard

Television in the United States
- Network: Untelevised
- Announcers: None

The 1980 Warner W. Hodgdon 400 was a NASCAR Winston Cup Series racing event that took place on June 8, 1980, at Riverside International Raceway in Riverside, California. The Sharon Hodgdon 200 for Grand American Stock cars was run the same day as this race. Ron Esau was the winner, Roy Smith was second Ray Elder third.

By 1980, NASCAR had completely stopped tracking the year model of all the vehicles and most teams did not take stock cars to the track under their own power anymore. Only manual transmission vehicles were allowed to participate in this race; a policy that NASCAR has retained to the present day. Road courses were one of the more attractive features for NASCAR during the 1980 Winston Cup Series season. NASCAR would develop a liking for tracks with a lap duration of a mile and a half by the 2014 NASCAR Sprint Cup Series season.

The NASCAR Winston Cup Series was also plagued with top teams running big engines and finishing in third place to avoid inspection around the time that this race was held.

== Race report ==
Darrell Waltrip would beat Neil Bonnett by less than half a second in front of 18000 fans in attendance; getting the season sweep at the Riverside road course. There were 18 different changes in the first-place position while there would be five different caution periods for 15 laps. Cale Yarborough would qualify for the pole position with a qualifying speed of 113.792 miles per hour (183.130 km/h) while the average speed of the race would be 101.846 miles per hour (163.905 km/h). Cecil Gordon would earn his last top-ten finish at this race. Other famous drivers who raced here included: Richard Petty, Cale Yarborough, Dale Earnhardt, Bobby Allison, Terry Labonte, and Richard Childress (now the owner of Richard Childress Racing).

D.K. Ulrich would finish last in the race due to an engine issue on the pace laps of this 95-lap race. He would make $1,000 just for qualifying ($3,908 when adjusted for inflation) while Waltrip went home with an extra $22,100 in his bank account ($86,356 when adjusted for inflation). Notable crew chiefs who were actively participating in this race included Junie Donlavey, Joey Arrington, Darel Dieringer, Darrell Bryant, Dale Inman, Bud Moore, Kirk Shelmerdine among others.

The race was named after famous race team owner/sponsor, owner of 12 race tracks, local city redeveloper, and philanthropist Warner Hodgdon.

Roy Smith was the only Canadian to appear in a 36-driver grid of mostly American-born competitors. J.D. McDuffie tallies his third and final top-10 of the season, all of being ninth-place runs. Smith would drive for NASCAR team owner Robert Beadle.

Don Waterman would make his NASCAR Winston Cup Series debut at this race.

The only known DNQ for the race was Gene Thoensen; an independent driver who was the driver of the unsponsored No. 77 machine.

=== Qualifying ===
Grid	No.	Driver	Manufacturer	Owner
1	11	Cale Yarborough	Chevrolet	Junior Johnson
2	88	Darrell Waltrip	Chevrolet	DiGard Racing
3	15	Bobby Allison	Ford	Bud Moore
4	73	Bill Schmitt	Oldsmobile	Bill Schmitt
5	2	Dale Earnhardt	Chevrolet	Rod Osterlund
6	43	Richard Petty	Chevrolet	Petty Enterprises
7	21	Neil Bonnett	Mercury	Wood Brothers
8	27	Benny Parsons	Chevrolet	M.C. Anderson
9	71	Dave Marcis	Chevrolet	Dave Marcis
10	44	Terry Labonte	Chevrolet	Billy Hagan
11	3	Richard Childress	Chevrolet	Richard Childress
12	67	Buddy Arrington	Dodge	Buddy Arrington
13	12	Donnie Allison	Chevrolet	Kennie Childers
14	75	Harry Gant	Chevrolet	RahMoc Enterprises
15	45	Roy Smith	Oldsmobile	Robert Beadle
16	25	Ronnie Thomas	Chevrolet	Don Robertson
17	40	D.K. Ulrich	Chevrolet	D.K. Ulrich
18	70	J.D. McDuffie	Chevrolet	J.D. McDuffie
19	66	Lake Speed	Chevrolet	Lake Speed
20	48	James Hylton	Chevrolet	James Hylton

== Top 20 finishers ==
Pos	No.	Driver	Manufacturer	Laps	Laps led	Time/Status
1	88	Darrell Waltrip	Chevrolet	95	23	2:26:38
2	21	Neil Bonnett	Mercury	95	20	+0.3 seconds
3	27	Benny Parsons	Chevrolet	95	0	Lead lap under green flag
4	11	Cale Yarborough	Chevrolet	95	3	Lead lap under green flag
5	2	Dale Earnhardt	Chevrolet	95	21	Lead lap under green flag
6	71	Dave Marcis	Chevrolet	94	1	+1 lap
7	75	Harry Gant	Chevrolet	94	1	+1 lap
8	43	Richard Petty	Chevrolet	93	0	+2 laps
9	70	J.D. McDuffie	Dodge	93	0	+2 laps
10	24	Cecil Gordon	Oldsmobile	93	0	+2 laps
11	90	Jody Ridley	Ford	92	0	+3 laps
12	48	James Hylton	Chevrolet	92	0	+3 laps
13	73	Bill Schmitt	Oldsmobile	92	0	Running
14	67	Buddy Arrington	Dodge	92	0	+3 laps
15	15	Bobby Allison	Ford	91	23	Valve problem
16	25	Ronnie Thomas	Chevrolet	91	0	+4 laps
17	13	Don Puskarich	Chevrolet	90	0	+5 laps
18	3	Richard Childress	Chevrolet	89	0	+6 laps
19	79	Joe Booher	Dodge	83	0	+12 laps
20	78	Jim Robinson	Chevrolet	82	0	+13 laps

== Standings after the race ==
Pos	Driver	Points	Differential
1	Dale Earnhardt	2255	0
2	Richard Petty	2219	-36
3	Cale Yarborough	2174	-81
4	Darrell Waltrip	2159	-96
5	Bobby Allison	2027	-228
6	Benny Parsons	2009	-246
7	Jody Ridley	1908	-347
8 ▲	Harry Gant	1861	-394
9 ▲	Dave Marcis	1842	-413
10 ▲	Richard Childress	1791	-464

Preceded by 1980 NASCAR 400	NASCAR Winston Cup Series Season; 1980	Succeeded by 1980 Gabriel 400
