= Yakima Speedway =

Former race track in Yakima, Washington

- Location: Pacific Avenue, Yakima, Washington
- Coordinates: 46°35′36″N 120°28′45″W
- Owner: Ted Pollock
- Operator: Doug Betteral
- Opened: 1956
- Closed: 2021; 5 years ago
- Major events: NASCAR Winston West Series; West Series races at Yakima (1964, 1967–1979, 1983–1985, 1994); NASCAR Northwest Series (1985–86, 1992–2006)

Paved Oval (1960–2021)
- Surface: Asphalt
- Length: 0.500 mi (0.805 km)
- Turns: 4

Dirt Oval (1956–1959)
- Surface: Dirt
- Length: 0.500 mi (0.805 km)
- Turns: 4

Yakima Speedway was a 0.500 mi (0.805 km) paved oval race track located in Yakima, Washington. It opened in 1956 as a dirt track. For most of its 62 years in operation, it was owned by Ted Pollock, who first visited the track at age 13 in 1956. The track held 21 NASCAR Winston West Series races between 1964 and 1994 and 42 NASCAR Northwest Series races between 1985 and 2006.

Pollock declined to renew the track's lease after he sold 16 acres of the property, including a portion which the track sat on, to Papé Machinery. Pollock had planned to renew the lease, but because he only owned part of the track, he no longer had the authority to lease the entire venue. Papé Machinery bought the land with plans to construct a new building on the property.

== Events ==
Yakima Speedway hosted the NASCAR Winston West Series in 1964, from 1967 to 1979, from 1983 to 1985, and 1994, totaling 21 races. Bill Amick won the inaugural series race in 1964. Ray Elder won the race in 1971, his ninth win of his third championship season. Ron Eaton won the race in 1984 over eventual season champion Jim Robinson. Other winners of the event included Hershel McGriff, who won three times, Jack McCoy, who won five times, and Harry Jefferson, who scored 3 of his 6 career wins at the track.

The NASCAR Northwest Series raced at the track from 1985 to 1986 and from 1992 to 2006, totaling 42 races. Winners included Eaton, Kevin Hamlin, and Jeff Jefferson.

Among its local events, the track hosted the Fall Classic. The 2020 running would turn out to be the only race at the track in 2020 and the final race at the track.

== See also ==
- West Series races at Yakima
