= Western Speedway =

Racetrack

Coordinates: 48°28′25″N 123°30′0″W

Westshore Motorsports Park (formerly “Western Speedway”) was a race track located just outside Victoria, British Columbia on southern Vancouver Island. It was a 4/10-mile (643 meter) paved oval track founded in 1954 and was western Canada’s oldest speedway until its closure in September 2022. The track was able to seat up to 3,000 fans and park up to 1,500 cars with a season running from April to September. The speedway hosted stock cars, late models, Old Time Racing Association, sprint cars winged and non-winged, demo cars/trucks, dwarf cars, drag races, mini figure eight cars, monster trucks, and more.

The track hosted 9 NASCAR Winston West Series events between 1970 and 1982 and 10 NASCAR Northwest Series races between 1986 and 1989.

The track also hosted 2 CASCAR West Series races in 2001 and 2002.
