= Portland Speedway =

Former NASCAR race track

Coordinates: 45°35′37″N 122°40′11″W

- Location: Portland, Oregon, U.S.
- Opened: 1924
- Closed: 2001
- Major events: NASCAR Craftsman Truck Series; NASCAR Winston West Series; World of Outlaws

Oval
- Surface: Clay (1924–1946; 2000–2001); Asphalt (1946–2000)
- Length: 0.50 mi (0.8 km)
- Turns: 4

Portland Speedway was a half-mile race track for auto racing in Portland, Oregon, U.S. It was in existence from 1924 until 2001.

== History ==
The track began as a five-eighths-mile (one km) clay oval in 1924 on the site of a field in north Portland. The track hosted big cars, midget cars, and stock cars before the suspension of racing during World War II.

The track was paved in 1946 as a half-mile oval. NASCAR sanctioning came to Portland after Western Speedways, Inc. leased the track in 1984. It hosted four NASCAR Craftsman Truck Series races from 1995 to 1998. Mike Skinner and Ron Hornaday Jr. won at Portland during their championship seasons, 1995 and 1996 respectively. Rich Bickle and Stacy Compton won the final two events there.

The NASCAR Winston West Series ran 36 Portland races between 1971 and 2000 with Hershel McGriff winning a series high five times. Other notable winners included future NASCAR Winston Cup champion Bobby Allison, 1990 Daytona 500 winner Derrike Cope, and NASCAR drivers Chad Little, Greg Biffle, and Ken Schrader. 1994 Portland winner Rick Carelli competed in all four Portland Craftsman Truck Series races, with three top tens and a best finish of third in 1998.

The track held a total of seven NASCAR Cup Series races during the 1956 and 1957 seasons.

Between 1956 and 2000, the track held many NASCAR West Series races.

The last race on the pavement surface was on July 30, 2000. The track was converted to a clay surface and hosted the World of Outlaws Sprint Cars in 2000 and 2001.

== See also ==
- West Series races at Portland Speedway
