= Rick McCray =

American racing driver (born 1956)

- Born: June 12, 1956 (age 70); Bloomington, California, U.S.

NASCAR Cup Series career
- 24 races run over 12 years
- Best finish: 48th (1983)
- First race: 1978 Winston Western 500 (Riverside)
- Last race: 1989 Banquet Frozen Foods 300 (Sonoma)
Wins	Top tens	Poles
0	0	0

NASCAR FedEx Freight Truck Series career
- 27 races run over 4 years
- Best finish: 27th (1999)
- First race: 1996 Kragen 151 (Sonoma)
- Last race: 1999 The Orleans 250 (Las Vegas)
Wins	Top tens	Poles
0	0	0

ARCA Menards Series West career
- 116 races run over 16 years
- Best finish: 4th (1980)
- First race: 1977 Winston Ontario 250 (Ontario)
- Last race: 1992 Winston October Classic (Mesa Marin)
- First win: 1982 Colorado Winston 200 (Colorado)
- Last win: 1982 Warner W. Hodgdon 200 (Riverside)
Wins	Top tens	Poles
2	44	1
- Statistics up to date as of March 21, 2025.

Rick McCray (born June 12, 1956) is an American former professional stock car racing driver who has competed in the NASCAR Winston Cup Series, the NASCAR Craftsman Truck Series, and the NASCAR Winston West Series.

McCray competed in the first NASCAR race held outside North America, the 1988 Goodyear NASCAR 500 at Australia's Calder Park Thunderdome, finishing 27th due to an accident 63 laps into the event.

McCray also competed in the NASCAR Southwest Series, the USAC Stock Car Series, and the NASCAR All-American Challenge Series.

== Motorsports career results ==
=== NASCAR ===
(key) (Bold - Pole position awarded by qualifying time. Italics - Pole position earned by points standings or practice time. * – Most laps led.)

==== Winston Cup Series ====
NASCAR Winston Cup Series results
Year	Team	No.	Make	1	2	3	4	5	6	7	8	9	10	11	12	13	14	15	16	17	18	19	20	21	22	23	24	25	26	27	28	29	30	31	NWCC	Pts	Ref
1978	McCray Racing	08	Dodge	RSD; 12	DAY	RCH	CAR	ATL	BRI	DAR	NWS	MAR	TAL	DOV	CLT	NSV																			58th	297	
1978	McCray Racing	08	Chevy														RSD; 13	MCH	DAY	NSV	POC	TAL	MCH	BRI	DAR	RCH	DOV	MAR	NWS	CLT	CAR	ATL	ONT; 39		58th	297	
1979	McCray Racing	08	Buick	RSD; DNQ	DAY	CAR	RCH	ATL	NWS	BRI	DAR	MAR	TAL	NSV	DOV	CLT	TWS	RSD; 27	MCH	DAY	NSV	POC	TAL	MCH	BRI	DAR	RCH	DOV	MAR	CLT	NWS	CAR	ATL	ONT	111th	82	
1980	McCray Racing	08	Buick	RSD; 35	DAY	RCH	CAR	ATL	BRI	DAR	NWS	MAR	TAL	NSV	DOV	CLT	TWS	RSD; 32	MCH	DAY	NSV	POC	TAL	MCH	BRI	DAR	RCH	DOV	NWS	MAR	CLT	CAR	ATL	ONT; 19	66th	231	
1981	McCray Racing	08	Chevy	RSD; 26	DAY	RCH	CAR	ATL	BRI	NWS	DAR	MAR	TAL	NSV	DOV	CLT	TWS	RSD	MCH	DAY	NSV	POC	TAL	MCH	BRI	DAR	RCH	DOV	MAR	NWS	CLT	CAR	ATL	RSD	89th	85	
1982	McCray Racing	08	Pontiac	DAY	RCH	BRI	ATL	CAR	DAR	NWS	MAR	TAL	NSV	DOV	CLT	POC	RSD; 14	MCH	DAY	NSV	POC	TAL	MCH	BRI	DAR	RCH	DOV	NWS	CLT	MAR	CAR	ATL	RSD; 34		54th	282	
1983	McCray Racing	08	Pontiac	DAY	RCH	CAR	ATL	DAR	NWS; 23	MAR; 24	TAL	NSV	DOV	BRI	CLT	RSD; 27	POC	MCH	DAY	NSV	POC	TAL	MCH	BRI	DAR	RCH	DOV	MAR	NWS	CLT	CAR	ATL	RSD; 39		48th	313	
1984	McCray Racing	08	Pontiac	DAY	RCH	CAR	ATL	BRI	NWS	DAR	MAR	TAL	NSV	DOV	CLT	RSD; 30	POC	MCH	DAY	NSV	POC	TAL	MCH	BRI	DAR	RCH	DOV	MAR	CLT	NWS	CAR	ATL			71st	125	
1984	McCray Racing	94	Buick																														RSD; 37		71st	125	
1985	McCray Racing	45	Chevy	DAY	RCH	CAR	ATL	BRI	DAR	NWS	MAR	TAL	DOV	CLT	RSD; 41	POC	MCH	DAY	POC	TAL	MCH	BRI	DAR	RCH	DOV	MAR	NWS	CLT	CAR	ATL	RSD; 39				99th	46	
1986	McCray Racing	08	Buick	DAY	RCH	CAR	ATL	BRI	DAR	NWS	MAR	TAL	DOV	CLT	RSD; 37	POC	MCH	DAY	POC	TAL	GLN	MCH	BRI	DAR	RCH	DOV	MAR	NWS	CLT	CAR	ATL				84th	131	
1986	Langley Racing	64	Ford																													RSD; 28			84th	131	
1987	Langley Racing	64	Ford	DAY	CAR	RCH	ATL	DAR	NWS	BRI	MAR	TAL	CLT	DOV	POC	RSD; 26	MCH	DAY	POC	TAL	GLN	MCH	BRI	DAR	RCH	DOV	MAR	NWS	CLT	CAR					73rd	143	
1987	Langley Racing	64	Chevy																												RSD; 35	ATL			73rd	143	
1988	McCray Racing	08	Pontiac	DAY	RCH	CAR	ATL	DAR	BRI	NWS	MAR	TAL	CLT	DOV	RSD; 37	POC	MCH	DAY	POC	TAL	GLN	MCH	BRI	DAR	RCH	DOV	MAR	CLT	NWS	CAR	PHO	ATL			83rd	52	
1989	McCray Racing	08	Pontiac	DAY	CAR	ATL	RCH	DAR	BRI	NWS	MAR	TAL	CLT	DOV	SON; 28	POC	MCH	DAY	POC	TAL	GLN	MCH	BRI	DAR	RCH	DOV	MAR	CLT	NWS	CAR	PHO; DNQ	ATL			84th	79	

==== Craftsman Truck Series ====
NASCAR Craftsman Truck Series results
Year	Team	No.	Make	1	2	3	4	5	6	7	8	9	10	11	12	13	14	15	16	17	18	19	20	21	22	23	24	25	26	27	NCTC	Pts	Ref
1996	McCray Racing	02	Chevy	HOM	PHO; DNQ	POR	EVG	TUS	CNS	HPT	BRI	NZH	MLW	LVL	I70	IRP	FLM	GLN	NSV	RCH	NHA	MAR	NWS	SON; 12	MMR; 32	PHO; DNQ	LVS				69th	268	
1997	McCray Racing	02	Chevy	WDW	TUS	HOM	PHO	POR; 32	EVG; 22	I70	NHA	TEX	BRI	NZH	MLW	LVL	CNS	HPT	IRP	FLM	NSV	GLN	RCH	MAR	SON; 27	MMR	CAL	PHO; 31	LVS; DNQ		58th	350	
1998	McCray Racing	42	Chevy	WDW; DNQ	HOM; DNQ	PHO; 28	POR; 32	EVG; 27	I70; DNQ	GLN	TEX	BRI	MLW	NZH	CAL; DNQ	PPR	IRP	NHA; 27	FLM	NSV	HPT; 29	LVL	RCH	MEM	GTY	MAR	SON	MMR		LVS; 29	38th	710	
1998	Xpress Motorsports	61	Chevy																										PHO; 28		38th	710	
1999	McCray Racing	42	Chevy	HOM; 16	PHO; 30	POR; 23	EVG; 17	TUS; 30	CNS; 23											NHA; 17	IRP; 28	GTY; 20	HPT; 25	RCH; 33	LVS; 19	LVL; DNQ					27th	1254	
1999	McCray Racing	42	Ford							PPR; 36	I70	BRI	TEX	PIR	GLN	MLW	NSV	NZH	MCH												27th	1254	
1999	Team Racing	23	Chevy																								TEX; DNQ	CAL			27th	1254	
