= Randy Becker (racing driver) =

American racing driver (born 1952)

- Born: October 2, 1952 (age 74); Highland, California, U.S.

NASCAR Cup Series career
- 4 races run over 2 years
- Best finish: 70th (1983)
- First race: 1982 Budweiser 400 (Riverside)
- Last race: 1983 Winston Western 500 (Riverside)
Wins	Top tens	Poles
0	0	0

ARCA Menards Series West career
- 28 races run over 6 years
- Best finish: 9th (1982)
- First race: 1981 Warner W. Hodgdon 200 (Riverside)
- Last race: 1991 Winston 200 (Saugus)
Wins	Top tens	Poles
0	8	0
- Statistics up to date as of March 5, 2026.

Randy Becker (born October 2, 1952) is an American former professional stock car racing driver. He competed in the NASCAR Winston Cup Series, NASCAR Winston West Series, and NASCAR Featherlite Southwest Tour.

== Racing career ==
Becker competed in the Copper World Classic seven times between 1977 and 1986, with a best finish of fifteenth.

In 1981, Becker made his NASCAR Winston West Series debut at Riverside International Raceway, finishing nineteenth. He made two more starts that season, scoring a top-ten at Sears Point International Raceway and eighteenth place result at Phoenix International Raceway.

Becker competed full time in the series in 1982, where he scored five top-tens and finished ninth in the final standings. In contesting the full West schedule, he made two NASCAR Winston Cup Series starts at Riverside that were in combination with the West Series. In his Cup debut, he finished 21st, and in the second race, he finished out of the race in 38th due to engine issues.

Becker competed in nine of ten Winston West races in 1983, scoring his first top-five at Riverside and finishing twelfth in points. He made his final two Cup starts as part of this season, crashing out of the first combination race but finishing fifteenth in the second.

After not competing in NASCAR in 1984, Becker returned for one start in the West Series in 1985, finishing twelfth at Evergreen Speedway. He also made his NASCAR All-American Challenge Series debut at Riverside, finishing fifteenth.

In 1986, Becker competed in a majority of the NASCAR Featherlite Southwest Tour's races, scoring two top-fives and six top-tens and finishing tenth in the standings. He would also make his final Winston Cup attempt, failing to qualify for the 1986 Winston Western 500.

Becker ran only two races in the Southwest Tour in 1987, with a third place result at Riverside.

Becker made his final five Southwest Tour starts in 1988, only running at the finish once.

After no NASCAR appearances in 1989, Becker made his first West Series start since 1985 in the 1990 season opener at Mesa Marin Raceway, finishing eleventh.

Becker made his final West Series start in 1991, where he finished in eighth at Saugus Speedway.

In 2021, Becker made a start in the Northwest Super Late Model Series at the Wenatchee Valley Super Oval, finishing 22nd.

== Motorsports career results ==
=== NASCAR ===
(key) (Bold – Pole position awarded by qualifying time. Italics – Pole position earned by points standings or practice time. * – Most laps led.)

==== Winston Cup Series ====
NASCAR Winston Cup Series results
Year	Team	No.	Make	1	2	3	4	5	6	7	8	9	10	11	12	13	14	15	16	17	18	19	20	21	22	23	24	25	26	27	28	29	30	NWCC	Pts	Ref
1982	Palmer Racing	65	Chrysler	DAY	RCH	BRI	ATL	CAR	DAR	NWS	MAR	TAL	NSV	DOV	CLT	POC	RSD; Wth																	103rd	49	
1982	Ulrich Racing	6	Dodge														RSD; 21	MCH	DAY	NSV	POC	TAL	MCH	BRI	DAR	RCH	DOV	NWS	CLT	MAR	CAR	ATL		103rd	49	
1982	Arrington Racing	87	Chrysler																														RSD; 38	103rd	49	
1983	Palmer Racing	64	Buick	DAY	RCH	CAR	ATL	DAR	NWS	MAR	TAL	NSV	DOV	BRI	CLT	RSD; 36	POC	MCH	DAY	NSV	POC	TAL	MCH	BRI	DAR	RCH	DOV	MAR	NWS	CLT	CAR	ATL		70th	173	
1983	Becker Racing	87	Buick																														RSD; 15	70th	173	
1986	Becker Racing	87	Buick	DAY	RCH	CAR	ATL	BRI	DAR	NWS	MAR	TAL	DOV	CLT	RSD	POC	MCH	DAY	POC	TAL	GLN	MCH	BRI	DAR	RCH	DOV	MAR	NWS	CLT	CAR	ATL	RSD; DNQ		149th	0	

==== Winston West Series ====
NASCAR Winston West Series results
Year	Team	No.	Make	1	2	3	4	5	6	7	8	9	10	11	12	13	14	NWWC	Pts	Ref
1981	Palmer Racing	67	Dodge	RSD	S99	AAS	MMR	RSD	LAG	POR	WSP	EVG	SHA	RSD; 19	SON; 10	RSD	PHO; 18	22nd	114	
1982	Palmer Racing	67	Chrysler	MMR; 8	S99; 15	AAS; 13		POR; 8	WSP; 10		EVG; 17	SON; 9	CDR; 6	RSD; 24		PHO; 28		9th	484	
1982	Palmer Racing	65	Chrysler				RSD; Wth											9th	484	
1982	Ulrich Racing	6	Dodge				RSD; 22											9th	484	
1982	Palmer Racing	6	Chrysler							SHA; 17								9th	484	
1982	Arrington Racing	87	Chrysler												RSD; 38			9th	484	
1983	Palmer Racing	67	Buick	S99; 11	SON; 12		YAK; 14	EVG; 11	SHA	RSD; 5	CPL; 20		PHO; 25					12th	346	
1983	Palmer Racing	64	Buick			RSD; 36												12th	346	
1983	Palmer Racing	87	Buick									RSD; 15						12th	346	
1985	Kramer Racing	71	Buick	SON	SHA	RSD	MMR	SIR	POR	STA	YAK	EVG; 12	WSR	MMR	RSD			39th	39	
1986	Becker Racing	87	Chevy	SON	RSD	EVG	RCS	TAC	PIR	WSR	RSD; DNQ							NA	0	
1990	S&S Racing	05	Olds	MMR; 11	SON	SGS	POR	EVG	RAS	TCR	MMR	PHO						39th	130	
1991	S&S Racing	05	Olds	EVG	MMR	SON	SGS; 8	POR	EVG	SSS	MMR	PHO						44th	142	
