= 1982 NASCAR Winston West Series =

29th season of the NASCAR Winston West Series

Seasons
- ← 1981 1983 →

The 1982 NASCAR Winston West Series was the 29th season of the series. The title was won by Roy Smith, his third in the series and third in succession.

== Teams and drivers ==
=== Complete schedule ===
Manufacturer	Team	No.	Driver
Buick	Bown Racing	16	Jim Bown
Buick	Don Waterman	38	Don Waterman
Buick	John Edgett	74	Roy Smith 10 (Note: Smith ran the full season split between Robert Beadle's No. 11, John Edgett's No. 74, and Kieper Racing's No. 98 entries.)
Buick	John Edgett	74	Gary Kershaw 3
Buick	Schmitt Racing	73	Bill Schmitt
Chevrolet	Baldwin Engineering	25	Jim Reich
Oldsmobile	Lois Williams	78	Jim Robinson
Pontiac	KC Racing	91	John Krebs
Pontiac	McCray Racing	08	Rick McCray

=== Partial schedule ===
Manufacturer	Team	No.	Driver	Races
Buick	Benfield Racing	8	Joe Ruttman	1
Buick	Canavan Racing	13	Earle Canavan	1
Buick	Chase Racing	29	Mike Chase	1
Buick	Dale Sorenson	61	Don Stanley	1
Buick	Dowdy Racing	88	Don Dowdy	1
Buick	Eaton Racing	7	Ron Eaton	9
Buick	Gary Smith	04	Hershel McGriff	11
Buick	Go-En Racing	17	Harry Goularte	3
Buick	Hylton Motorsports	48	Dennis DeVea	1
Buick	Hylton Motorsports	49	Steve Kosiski	1
Buick	Kershaw Racing	13	Gary Kershaw	1
Buick	Lee Racing	66	Jim Lee	4
Buick	Lee Racing	66	Ron Esau	1
Buick	McKnight Racing	82	Sumner McKnight	11
Buick	Preston Bailey	61	Clive Skilton	7
Buick	Robert Beadle	11	Roy Smith	1
Buick	Robert Beadle	11	Tobey Butler	1
Buick	Schmitt Racing	70	Roger Gannon	1
Buick	Schmitt Racing	70	Bob Bondurant	1
Buick	Schmitt Racing	75	Neil Bonnett	1
Buick	Terris Racing	13	Kevin Terris	2
Buick	Thonesen Racing	07	Gene Thonesen	7
Buick	Unknown	28	Al Vanderbyl	3
Chevrolet	DiGard Motorsports	88	Bobby Allison	2
Chevrolet	Pat Mintey	35	Pat Mintey	6
Chevrolet	Sedgwick Racing	35	Bill Sedgwick	1
Chrysler	Palmer Racing	6	Bud Palmer	1
Chrysler	Palmer Racing	6	Randy Becker (Note: Becker ran the complete schedule split between the Ulrich Racing No. 6 and the Palmer Racing No. 65 entries.)	1
Chrysler	Palmer Racing	67	Randy Becker	10
Chrysler	Palmer Racing	67	Bud Palmer	1
Dodge	Ulrich Racing	6	Randy Becker	1
Ford	Jefferson Racing	95	Derrike Cope	4
Ford	Langley Racing	64	Mark Stahl	1
Ford	Mark Stahl	85	Mark Stahl	10
Oldsmobile	Kieper Racing	98	Johnny Kieper	4
Oldsmobile	Kieper Racing	98	Roy Smith	2
Oldsmobile	Kieper Racing	98	Jim Walker	1
Oldsmobile	Kieper Racing	98	Roy Haslam	1
Pontiac	Boys Racing	84	Trevor Boys	4
Pontiac	Hamby Racing	1	Clark Dwyer	1
Pontiac	Midgley Racing	29	Terry Forsythe	1
Pontiac	Miller Racing	51	Scott Miller	1
Pontiac	Petty Enterprises	43	Richard Petty	3
Pontiac	Pfeifer Racing	0	Steve Pfeifer	3
Pontiac	RahMoc Enterprises	75	Jimmy Insolo	1
Pontiac	Rich Olson	3	Randy Olson	1
Pontiac	Unknown	29	Rocky Collins	1
Buick 4 Chevrolet 3 Oldsmobile 2	Puskarich Racing	13	Don Puskarich	6
Buick 4 Chevrolet 3 Oldsmobile 2	Puskarich Racing	13	Jack Epperson	1
Buick 4 Chevrolet 3 Oldsmobile 2	Puskarich Racing	13	Doug Wheeler	1
Buick 4 Chevrolet 3 Oldsmobile 2	Puskarich Racing	13	Tom Patston	1
Chevrolet 9 Pontiac 1	Kord Racing	94	Bob Kennedy	10
Pontiac 3 Buick 1	Francis Racing	33	Glenn Francis	4

== Schedule and results ==
The 1982 season included 13 individual races, although Riverside International Raceway hosted three races. The first and third races at Riverside were in combination with the NASCAR Winston Cup Series.

Date	Name	Racetrack	Location	Winner
May 8	Winston Mesa Marin 150	Mesa Marin Raceway	Bakersfield, California	Jim Robinson
May 15	Stockton Winston 150	Stockton 99 Speedway	Stockton, California	Jim Bown
May 29	Winston Roseville 150	All American Speedway	Roseville, California	Jim Bown
June 13	Budweiser 400	Riverside International Raceway	Riverside, California	Tim Richmond
July 4	Winston Portland 150	Rose City Speedway	Portland, Oregon	Ron Eaton
July 10	Victoria Winston 150	Western Speedway	Victoria, British Columbia	Jim Reich
July 24	Winston Shasta 150	Shasta Speedway	Anderson, California	Ron Eaton
August 1	Winston Evergreen 200	Evergreen Speedway	Monroe, Washington	Ron Eaton
August 8	Sears Point Winston 200	Sears Points International Raceway	Sonoma, California	Roy Smith
August 15	Colorado Winston 200	Continental Divide Raceways	Castle Rock, Colorado	Rick McCray
August 29	Warner W. Hodgdon 200	Riverside International Raceway	Riverside, California	Rick McCray
November 21	Winston Western 500	Riverside International Raceway	Riverside, California	Tim Richmond
November 28	Coors 250	Phoenix International Raceway	Avondale, Arizona	Bobby Allison

== Full Drivers' Championship ==
(key) Bold – Pole position awarded by time. Italics – Pole position set by owner's points. * – Most laps led. † – Ineligible for West Series points

Pos	Driver	MMR	S99	AAS	RSD	POR	WSP	SHA	EVG	SON	CDR	RSD	RSD	PHO	Pts
1	Roy Smith	15	5	6	6	4	4	5	3	**1***	5	**3**	24	6	607
2	Jim Reich	13	6	5	10	3	1*	2	8	2	2	14	19	20	592
3	Jim Bown	14	**1***	**1**	17	2	16	3	2	13	14	2	10	22	586
4	Jim Robinson	1	3	4	28	7	3	9	18	3	17	6	20	5	581
5	Bill Schmitt	2*	2	11*	24	6	15	6	6	6	3	4	21	7	579
6	Rick McCray	4	4	2	14	20	12	10	19	19	1*	1	34	9	565
7	Don Waterman	6	11	3	11	14	2	4	5	16	12	5	33	10	561
8	John Krebs	20	10	9	19	10	11	12	9	4	13	12	37	21	511
9	Randy Becker	8	15	13	22	8	10	17	17	9	6	24	38	28	484
10	Hershel McGriff	3	8	14	33	19			4	20	**10**	20*	28	3	348
11	Sumner McKnight	11	13	10		9	18	8	11	12	4	11		18	436
12	Mark Stahl	21	14		21	18	13	14	10	18		10	39	31	386
13	Ron Eaton	**18**				**1***	**19**	**1***	**1***	21	7	19		23	379
14	Bob Kennedy	16			DNQ	11	9	19	14	8	9	13		13	378
15	Gene Thonesen	12	12	12				16		14		17		30	300
16	Don Puskarich	9	9	8	20	13						23			236
17	Clive Skilton							15	12	10	11	16	DNQ	33	235
18	Pat Mintey					17	17			11	16	9		24	212
19	Gary Kershaw	10	7	7			8								172
20	Johnny Kieper					12		11	7					8	166
21	Jim Lee				34	16						8	23		159
22	Derrike Cope					5	14						36	14	158
23	Steve Pfeifer				Wth					17		21		19	156
24	Glenn Francis	17										18	14	16	151
25	Trevor Boys										15	22	22	15	146
26	Al Vanderbyl						6		15					34	98
27	Harry Goularte									15		15		29	94
28	Scott Miller											7			91
29	Don Stanley				Wth	15									66
30	Bud Palmer						20	18							64
31	Bobby Allison				27†								16†	1	60
32	Kevin Terris												41	27	58
33	Neil Bonnett				5†								4†	2*	49
34	Joe Ruttman				26†								40†	**4**	47
35	Rocky Collins						5								46
36	Bill Sedgwick	5													46
37	Doug Wheeler									5					46
	Bob Bondurant									7					44
	Roy Haslam						7								44
	Jim Walker	7													44
	Tom Patson										8				43
	Clark Dwyer													11	40
	Randy Olson													12	39
	Jack Epperson							13							38
	Terry Forsythe								13						38
	Ron Esau													17	34
	Earle Canavan													25	26
	Steve Kosiki													26	25
	Richard Petty				36†								31†	32	19
	Dennis DeVea													35	16
	Roger Gannon							7							
	Tobey Butler								16						
	Mike Chase	19													
	Don Dowdy								20						
	Jimmy Insolo												30		
	Lennie Pond				Wth										
	Donnie Allison				Wth										
	Slick Johnson				Wth										
	Jim Lee				Wth										
	Tommy Gale				Wth										

== See also ==
- 1982 NASCAR Winston Cup Series
- 1982 NASCAR Budweiser Late Model Sportsman Series
