= 1982 NASCAR Winston Cup Series =

American motorsport season

Seasons
- ← 1981 1983 →

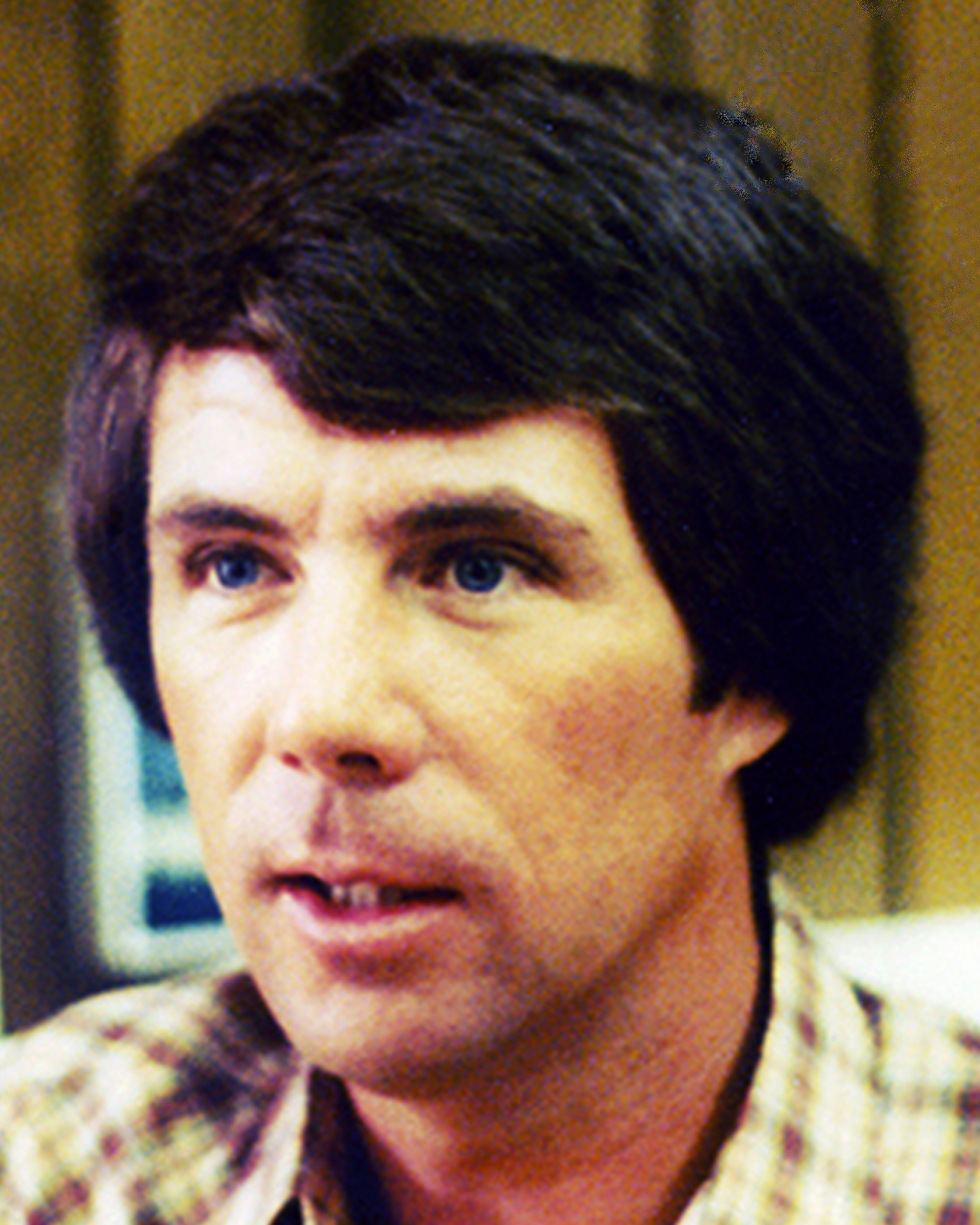
Waltrip, the Winston Cup Series champion in 1981 & 1982

The 1982 NASCAR Winston Cup Series was the 34th season of professional stock car racing in the United States and the 11th in the modern-era. The season began on February 14 at the Daytona International Speedway and concluded on November 21 at Riverside International Raceway. Darrell Waltrip took his second straight championship driving for Junior Johnson by 72 points over Bobby Allison.

== Teams and drivers ==
| Team | Make | No. | Driver | Car Owner | Crew Chief |
|---|---|---|---|---|---|
| Arrington Racing | Dodge Mirada | 67 | Buddy Arrington | Buddy Arrington | |
| Benfield Racing | Buick Regal | 98 | Morgan Shepherd | Ron Benfield | Buddy Parrott |
| Bud Moore Engineering | Ford Thunderbird | 15 | Dale Earnhardt | Bud Moore | Bud Moore |
| Cliff Stewart Racing | Pontiac Grand Prix | 50 | Geoff Bodine (R) | Cliff Stewart | |
| DiGard Motorsports | Chevrolet Monte Carlo 14; Buick Regal 14 | 88 | Bobby Allison | Bill Gardner | Gary Nelson |
| Donlavey Racing | Ford Thunderbird | 90 | Jody Ridley | Junie Donlavey | |
| Hagan Racing | Buick Regal | 44 | Terry Labonte | Billy Hagan | Jake Elder |
| Hamby Motorsports | Buick Regal 20; Pontiac Grand Prix 9 | 17 | Lowell Cowell 1 | Roger Hamby | |
| Hamby Motorsports | Buick Regal 20; Pontiac Grand Prix 9 | 17 | Lake Speed 29 | Roger Hamby | |
| Hylton Racing | Pontiac Grand Prix | 48 | James Hylton | James Hylton | |
| Jim Stacy Racing | Buick Regal | 2 | Tim Richmond (R) | Jim Stacy | Dale Inman |
| Johnny Hayes Racing | Buick Regal | 55 | Benny Parsons | Johnny Hayes | |
| Junior Johnson & Associates | Buick Regal | 11 | Darrell Waltrip | Junior Johnson | Jeff Hammond |
| Langley Racing | Ford Thunderbird | 64 | Tommy Gale | Elmo Langley | |
| M. C. Anderson Racing | Buick Regal | 27 | Cale Yarborough | M. C. Anderson | Tim Brewer |
| Mach 1 Racing | Buick Regal | 33 | Harry Gant | Hal Needham | Travis Carter |
| Marcis Auto Racing | Chevrolet Monte Carlo | 71 | Dave Marcis | Dave Marcis | |
| Martin Racing | Buick Regal 18; Pontiac Grand Prix 13 | 02 | Mark Martin (R) | Bud Reeder | |
| McDuffie Racing | Pontiac Grand Prix | 70 | J. D. McDuffie | J. D. McDuffie | |
| Means Racing | Buick Regal | 52 | Jimmy Means | Jimmy Means | |
| Melling Racing | Ford Thunderbird | 9 | Bill Elliott 21 | Harry Melling | Ernie Elliott |
| Petty Enterprises | Pontiac Grand Prix | 42 | Kyle Petty 23 | Richard Petty | Mike Beam |
| Petty Enterprises | Pontiac Grand Prix | 43 | Richard Petty | Richard Petty | Maurice Petty |
| Race Hill Farm Team | Buick Regal | 47 | Ron Bouchard | Jack Beebe | David Ifft |
| RahMoc Enterprises | Buick Regal | 75 | Joe Ruttman | Bob Rahilly | Bob Rahilly |
| Ranier-Lundy Racing | Chevrolet Monte Carlo | 28 | Buddy Baker | Harry Ranier | Waddell Wilson |
| Richard Childress Racing | Pontiac Grand Prix | 3 | Ricky Rudd | Richard Childress | Kirk Shelmerdine |
| Thomas Racing | Pontiac Grand Prix | 25 | Ronnie Thomas | Ronnie Thomas | |
| Ulrich Racing | Buick Regal | 6 | D. K. Ulrich | D. K. Ulrich | |
| Wawak Racing | Buick Regal | 94 | Bobby Wawak | Bobby Wawak | |
| Wood Brothers Racing | Ford Thunderbird | 21 | Neil Bonnett | Glen Wood | Leonard Wood |

== Schedule ==
| No. | Race title | Track | Date |
|---|---|---|---|
| | Busch Clash | Daytona International Speedway, Daytona Beach | February 7 |
| | UNO Twin 125 Qualifiers | Daytona International Speedway, Daytona Beach | February 11 |
| | Daytona 500 Consolation Race | Daytona International Speedway, Daytona Beach | February 12 |
| 1 | **Daytona 500** | Daytona International Speedway, Daytona Beach | February 14 |
| 2 | Richmond 400 | Richmond Fairgrounds Raceway, Richmond | February 21 |
| 3 | Valleydale 500 | Bristol International Raceway, Bristol | March 14 |
| 4 | Coca-Cola 500 | Atlanta International Raceway, Hampton | March 21 |
| 5 | Carolina 500 | North Carolina Motor Speedway, Rockingham | March 28 |
| 6 | CRC Chemicals Rebel 500 | Darlington Raceway, Darlington | April 4 |
| 7 | Northwestern Bank 400 | North Wilkesboro Speedway, North Wilkesboro | April 18 |
| 8 | Virginia National Bank 500 | Martinsville Speedway, Ridgeway | April 25 |
| 9 | **Winston 500** | Alabama International Motor Speedway, Talladega | May 2 |
| 10 | Cracker Barrel Country Store 420 | Nashville Speedway, Nashville | May 8 |
| 11 | Mason-Dixon 500 | Dover Downs International Speedway, Dover | May 16 |
| 12 | **World 600** | Charlotte Motor Speedway, Concord | May 30 |
| 13 | Van Scoy Diamond Mine 500 | Pocono International Raceway, Long Pond | June 6 |
| 14 | Budweiser 400 | Riverside International Raceway, Riverside | June 13 |
| 15 | Gabriel 400 | Michigan International Speedway, Brooklyn | June 20 |
| 16 | Firecracker 400 | Daytona International Speedway, Daytona Beach | July 4 |
| 17 | Busch Nashville 420 | Nashville Speedway, Nashville | July 10 |
| 18 | Mountain Dew 500 | Pocono International Raceway, Long Pond | July 25 |
| 19 | Talladega 500 | Alabama International Motor Speedway, Talladega | August 1 |
| 20 | Champion Spark Plug 400 | Michigan International Speedway, Brooklyn | August 22 |
| 21 | Busch 500 | Bristol International Raceway, Bristol | August 28 |
| 22 | **Southern 500** | Darlington Raceway, Darlington | September 6 |
| 23 | Wrangler Sanfor-Set 400 | Richmond Fairgrounds Raceway, Richmond | September 12 |
| 24 | CRC Chemicals 500 | Dover Downs International Speedway, Dover | September 19 |
| 25 | Holly Farms 400 | North Wilkesboro Speedway, North Wilkesboro | October 3 |
| 26 | National 500 | Charlotte Motor Speedway, Concord | October 10 |
| 27 | Old Dominion 500 | Martinsville Speedway, Ridgeway | October 17 |
| 28 | Warner W. Hodgdon American 500 | North Carolina Motor Speedway, Rockingham | October 31 |
| 29 | Atlanta Journal 500 | Atlanta International Raceway, Hampton | November 7 |
| 30 | Winston Western 500 | Riverside International Raceway, Riverside | November 21 |

- **Bolded** races indicate a NASCAR Crown Jewel race

== 1982 Non-Points Results (Cup Series Speedweeks) ==
=== Busch Clash ===
The 1982 season unofficially kicked off on February 7 with the non-points fourth annual Busch Clash, open to all pole winners from the 1981 season in a 20 lap (50 mi (80 km)) dash. Terry Labonte drew pole position

Top Five

1. 88-Bobby Allison
2. 44-Terry Labonte
3. 21-Neil Bonnett
4. 11-Darrell Waltrip
5. 27-Cale Yarborough

Time of Race: 15 minutes, 39 seconds
Caution Flags: None
Margin Of Victory: 1.5 car lengths

- Of the 13 drivers that started this race, 11 finished the race and all of those finishers were on the lead lap.
- Bobby Allison became the fourth different winner of this annual race. He took home $50,000.

=== UNO Twin 125 Qualifiers ===
On February 11 the Uno Twin 125 Mile Qualifiers were held. Benny Parsons was on the pole for race 1 with a speed of 196.317 mph and Harry Gant was on the pole for race 2 with a speed of 195.609 mph.

Race 1 Top Five

1. 27-Cale Yarborough
2. 44-Terry Labonte
3. 88-Bobby Allison
4. 28-Benny Parsons
5. 51-A. J. Foyt

Time of Race: 55 minutes, 26 seconds
Caution Flags: 5 for 17 Laps
Margin Of Victory: 2 car lengths

Race 2 Top Five

1. 1-Buddy Baker
2. 11-Darrell Waltrip
3. 2-Joe Ruttman
4. 15-Dale Earnhardt
5. 42-Kyle Petty

Time of Race: 51 minutes, 54 seconds
Caution Flags: 2 for 12 Laps
Margin Of Victory: Under Caution

=== Daytona 500 Consolation Race ===
On February 12, NASCAR allowed all 14 cars that failed to qualify for the Daytona 500 to race in a consolation race at a 30 lap (75 mi (121 km)) distance. Slick Johnson was on the pole.

Top Five

1. 29-Tim Richmond (R)
2. 48-Slick Johnson
3. 25-Ronnie Thomas
4. 05-Bill Meazell
5. 49-James Hylton

Time of Race: 31 minutes, 17 seconds
Caution Flags: 1 for 6 Laps
Margin Of Victory: 0.21 seconds

== 1982 Season Results ==
=== Daytona 500 ===
The 1982 season officially kicked off on February 14 with the Daytona 500 held at the Daytona International Speedway. Benny Parsons won the pole with a speed of 196.317 mph.

Top Ten

1. 88-Bobby Allison
2. 27-Cale Yarborough
3. 2-Joe Ruttman
4. 44-Terry Labonte
5. 9-Bill Elliott
6. 47-Ron Bouchard
7. 33-Harry Gant
8. 1-Buddy Baker
9. 90-Jody Ridley
10. 30-Roy Smith

Time of Race: 3 hours 14 minutes 49 seconds
Caution Flags: 5 for 34 Laps
Margin Of Victory: 22.87 seconds

- Bobby Allison, who had won the Busch Clash on February 7, would dominate the race leading 147 of 200 laps and cruise to victory. Buick would take seven of the first eight finishing spots. There was controversy in Allison's victory as his rear bumper fell off a few laps into the race, which ended up giving the car an aerodynamic advantage.
- This also would be the first time since 1971 that no Chevrolets were in the field.

=== Richmond 400 ===
The Richmond 400 was run on February 21 at the Richmond Fairgrounds Raceway. Darrell Waltrip won the pole with a speed of 93.256 mph.

Top Ten

1. 71-Dave Marcis
2. 43-Richard Petty
3. 27-Benny Parsons
4. 15-Dale Earnhardt
5. 44-Terry Labonte
6. 50-Joe Millikan
7. 21-Neil Bonnett
8. 88-Bobby Allison
9. 47-Ron Bouchard
10. 98-Morgan Shepherd

Time of Race: 1 hour 51 minutes 30 seconds.
Caution Flags: 6 for 33 laps.
Margin of Victory: Under Caution
Race shortened to 250 of 400 laps due to rain.

- Dave Marcis captured the final win of his career and the only victory with his own team.

=== Valleydale 500 ===
The Valleydale 500 was held on March 14 at the Bristol International Raceway. Darrell Waltrip won the pole with a speed of 111.068 mph.

Top Ten

1. 11-Darrell Waltrip
2. 15-Dale Earnhardt
3. 98-Morgan Shepherd
4. 44-Terry Labonte
5. 88-Bobby Allison
6. 33-Harry Gant
7. 43-Richard Petty
8. 47-Ron Bouchard
9. 28-Benny Parsons
10. 71-Dave Marcis

Time of Race: 2 hours 49 minutes 52 seconds
Caution Flags: 3 for 25 laps
Margin of Victory: 13.2 seconds

- Darrell Waltrip would go on to win his first race of the season. He and Dale Earnhardt would combine to lead 477 of 500 laps.

=== Coca-Cola 500 ===
The Coca-Cola 500 was held on March 21 at the Atlanta International Raceway. Dale Earnhardt won the pole with a speed of 163.774 mph.

Top Ten

1. 11-Darrell Waltrip
2. 43-Richard Petty
3. 27-Cale Yarborough
4. 28-Benny Parsons
5. 33-Harry Gant
6. 98-Morgan Shepherd
7. 75-Gary Balough
8. 44-Terry Labonte
9. 62-Rick Wilson
10. 5-Jim Sauter

Time of Race: 3 hours 29 minutes 58 seconds
Caution Flags: 7 for 47 laps
Margin of Victory: Under Caution
Race shortened to 287 of 328 laps due to rain.

- Darrell Waltrip led 33 laps and when rain hit in the final laps he beat Richard Petty by inches to the race-ending yellow. It was Waltrip's second win of the 1982 Winston Cup season.
- Dale Earnhardt led 155 laps but finished 28th.
- Gary Balough scored his best ever finish of 7th .
- This race provided footage for the motion picture Six Pack.

=== Warner W. Hodgdon Carolina 500 ===
The Carolina 500 was originally scheduled for March 21 at the North Carolina Motor Speedway but due to rain it was postponed and held on March 28. Benny Parsons won the pole with a speed of 141.577 mph.

Top Ten

1. 27-Cale Yarborough
2. 44-Terry Labonte
3. 28-Benny Parsons
4. 88-Bobby Allison
5. 98-Morgan Shepherd
6. 50-Joe Millikan
7. 11-Darrell Waltrip
8. 33-Harry Gant
9. 67-Buddy Arrington
10. 70-J. D. McDuffie

Time of Race: 4 hours 3 minutes 27 seconds
Caution Flags: 9 for 86 laps
Margin of Victory: 1 lap

- Cale Yarborough led 51 laps on way to winning his first Winston Cup race of 1982.
- Darrell Waltrip led 148 laps and finished 7th.
- Neil Bonnett led 128 laps and finished 19th.
- Gary Balough whom brought out the races final caution flag for a crash ended up finishing 12th. It was his last Cup Series race until 1991 as he was shortly after this event sentenced to prison for drug trafficking charges as was Billie Harvey, Tim Richmond's car owner.
- Last Top 10 finish for J. D. McDuffie.

=== CRC Chemicals Rebel 500 ===
The CRC Chemicals Rebel 500 was held on April 4 at the Darlington Raceway. Buddy Baker won his 1st pole since 1980 with a speed of 153.979 mph.

Top Ten

1. 15-Dale Earnhardt
2. 27-Cale Yarborough
3. 9-Bill Elliott
4. 28-Benny Parsons
5. 2-Tim Richmond (R)
6. 44-Terry Labonte
7. 02-Mark Martin (R)
8. 67-Buddy Arrington
9. 37-Donnie Allison
10. 24-Lennie Pond

Time of Race: 4 hours 3 minutes 27 seconds
Caution Flags: 8 for 53 laps
Margin of Victory: 3 feet

- Unfortunately pole sitter Buddy Baker would finish last (37th) due to flywheel problems.
- Dale Earnhardt led 181 laps on way to his only Winston Cup race win of 1982, his first victory since the October 5th 1980 National 500 at Charlotte, and his first victory in a Ford.

=== Northwestern Bank 400 ===
The Northwestern Bank 400 was held on April 18 at the North Wilkesboro Speedway. Darrell Waltrip won the pole with a speed of 114.801 mph .

Top Ten

1. 11-Darrell Waltrip
2. 44-Terry Labonte
3. 15-Dale Earnhardt
4. 28-Benny Parsons
5. 43-Richard Petty
6. 33-Harry Gant
7. 98-Morgan Shepherd
8. 88-Bobby Allison
9. 3-Ricky Rudd
10. 37-Neil Bonnett

Time of Race: 2 hours 33 minutes 37 seconds
Caution Flags: 6 for 34 laps
Margin of Victory: Under Caution

- Darrell Waltrip led 345 of 400 laps on way to winning his third Winston Cup race of 1982.

=== Virginia National Bank 500 ===
The Virginia National Bank 500 was held on April 25 at the Martinsville Speedway. Terry Labonte won the pole with a speed of 89.988 mph.

Top Ten

1. 33-Harry Gant
2. 01-Butch Lindley
3. 21-Neil Bonnett
4. 3-Ricky Rudd
5. 11-Darrell Waltrip
6. 71-Dave Marcis
7. 02-Mark Martin (R)
8. 67-Buddy Arrington
9. 40-Jimmy Hensley
10. 48-Slick Johnson

Time of Race: 3 hours 30 minutes 1 seconds
Caution Flags: 9 for 46 laps
Margin of Victory: 1 lap

- Harry Gant led 167 laps on way to his first ever Winston Cup race victory after finishing in 2nd place 9 different times.

=== Winston 500 ===
The Winston 500 was held on May 2 at the Alabama International Motor Speedway. Benny Parsons won the pole with a speed of 200.176 mph.

Top Ten

1. 11-Darrell Waltrip
2. 44-Terry Labonte
3. 28-Benny Parsons
4. 42-Kyle Petty
5. 98-Morgan Shepherd
6. 37-Donnie Allison
7. 2-Tim Richmond (R)
8. 15-Dale Earnhardt
9. 52-Jimmy Means
10. 02-Mark Martin (R)

Time of Race: 3 hours 11 minutes 19 seconds
Caution Flags: 8 for 39 laps
Margin of Victory: 3 car lengths

- The lead changed 53 times among 13 drivers. Parsons drafted into the lead with three laps to go; on the final lap he swung low to break the draft, but Waltrip, Labonte, and Petty drafted past on the high side; Parsons edged Petty while Labonte's last-second bid for the win fell short. Darrell Waltrip led 54 laps on way to his fourth Winston Cup race victory of 1982.
- The race is also remembered for the bizarre story of the mysterious L. W. Wright, a con-artist pretending to be a NASCAR veteran. Wright started and finished near the back, then after the race disappeared after the checks for a NASCAR license and car bounced, going in hiding for almost 40 years until resurfacing for an interview with The Scene Vault's Rick Houston

=== Cracker Barrel Country Store 420 ===
The Cracker Barrel Country Store 420 was held on May 8 at the Nashville Speedway. Darrell Waltrip won the pole with a speed of 102.773 mph.

Top Ten

1. 11-Darrell Waltrip
2. 44-Terry Labonte
3. 47-Ron Bouchard
4. 75-Joe Ruttman
5. 37-Neil Bonnett
6. 88-Bobby Allison
7. 2-Tim Richmond (R)
8. 71-Dave Marcis
9. 43-Richard Petty
10. 15-Dale Earnhardt

Time of Race: 2 hours 59 minutes 52 seconds
Caution Flags: 5 for 39 laps
Margin of Victory: 1 lap

- Darrell Waltrip led 419 of 420 laps on way to winning his fifth Winston Cup race of 1982.

=== Mason-Dixon 500 ===
The Mason-Dixon 500 was held on May 16 at the Dover Downs International Speedway. Darrell Waltrip won the pole with a speed of 139.308 mph .

Top Ten

1. 88-Bobby Allison
2. 71-Dave Marcis
3. 15-Dale Earnhardt
4. 44-Terry Labonte
5. 02-Mark Martin (R)
6. 47-Ron Bouchard
7. 98-Morgan Shepherd
8. 37-Donnie Allison
9. 2-Tim Richmond (R)
10. 17-Lake Speed

Time of Race: 4 hours 9 minutes 43 seconds
Caution Flags: 6 for 32 laps
Margin of Victory: 3 laps

- Allison led 488 of 500 laps for the first Winston Cup win by a car equipped with power steering and his second Winston Cup race victory of 1982.

=== World 600 ===
The World 600 was held on May 30 at the Charlotte Motor Speedway. David Pearson won the pole with a speed of 162.511 mph.

Top Ten

1. 21-Neil Bonnett
2. 9-Bill Elliott
3. 88-Bobby Allison
4. 27-Cale Yarborough
5. 1-Buddy Baker
6. 90-Jody Ridley
7. 3-Ricky Rudd
8. 43-Richard Petty
9. 71-Dave Marcis
10. 47-Ron Bouchard

Time of Race: 4 hours 36 minutes 48 seconds
Caution Flags: 10 for 62 laps
Margin of Victory: 2 car lengths

- Neil Bonnett won his only Winston Cup race of 1982. It was his final victory with Wood Brothers Racing.

=== Van Scoy Diamond Mine 500 ===
The inaugural Van Scoy Diamond Mine 500 was held on June 6 at the Pocono International Raceway. Terry Labonte was on the pole because qualifying was rained out so the line up was set by the current Winston Cup points standings. This was the only time in 1982 that qualifying was rained out.

Top Ten

1. 88-Bobby Allison
2. 2-Tim Richmond (R)
3. 28-Benny Parsons
4. 33-Harry Gant
5. 44-Terry Labonte
6. 3-Ricky Rudd
7. 43-Richard Petty
8. 50-Geoff Bodine (R)
9. 90-Jody Ridley
10. 71-Dave Marcis

Time of Race: 4 hours 24 minutes 8 seconds
Caution Flags: 7 for 51 laps
Margin of Victory: Under Caution

- Bobby Allison led the most laps (75 of 200) in route to his third Winston Cup race victory of 1982.
- Darrell Waltrip led 10 laps and finished 13th.

=== Budweiser 400 ===
The Budweiser 400 was held on June 13 at the Riverside International Raceway. Terry Labonte won the pole with a speed of 162.511 mph.

Top Ten

1. 2-Tim Richmond (R)
2. 44-Terry Labonte
3. 50-Geoff Bodine (R)
4. 15-Dale Earnhardt
5. 21-Neil Bonnett
6. 74-Roy Smith
7. 90-Jody Ridley
8. 02-Mark Martin (R)
9. 47-Ron Bouchard
10. 25-Jim Reich

Time of Race: 2 hours 23 minutes 51 seconds
Caution Flags: 1 for 7 laps
Margin of Victory: 3.82 seconds

- Rookie Tim Richmond led just 10 laps for his first ever Winston Cup victory.
- Darrell Waltrip had a dismal day falling out of the race after 28 laps with a piston failure finishing 32nd with no laps led.
- Bobby Allison didn't fare much better falling out of the race after 47 laps with engine failure but he led 15 laps.
- Terry Labonte padded to his points lead by finishing 2nd and leading the most laps (64). Labonte now led by 144 points over Allison, 210 points over Waltrip.

=== Gabriel 400 ===
The Gabriel 400 was held on June 20 at the Michigan International Speedway. Ron Bouchard won the pole (his second ever of a total three) with a speed of 162.404 mph.

Top Ten

1. 27-Cale Yarborough
2. 11-Darrell Waltrip
3. 9-Bill Elliott
4. 88-Bobby Allison
5. 3-Ricky Rudd
6. 42-Kyle Petty
7. 15-Dale Earnhardt
8. 98-Morgan Shepherd
9. 50-Geoff Bodine (R)
10. 33-Harry Gant

Time of Race: 3 hours 23 minutes 13 seconds
Caution Flags: 3 for 42 laps
Margin of Victory: 3 car lengths

- Cale Yarborough led 73 laps for his second Winston Cup race victory of 1982.

=== Firecracker 400 ===
The Firecracker 400 was held on July 4 at the Daytona International Speedway. Rookie Geoff Bodine won the first Winston Cup pole of his career (he would win 37 in his career) with a speed of 194.721 mph.

Top Ten

1. 88-Bobby Allison
2. 9-Bill Elliott
3. 47-Ron Bouchard
4. 98-Morgan Shepherd
5. 03-David Pearson
6. 50-Geoff Bodine (R)
7. 3-Ricky Rudd
8. 1-Buddy Baker
9. 17-Lake Speed
10. 71-Dave Marcis

Time of Race: 2 hours 27 minutes 9 seconds
Caution Flags: 5 for 25 laps
Margin of Victory: 2 car lengths

- Bobby Allison won his fourth Winston Cup race of 1982. He also led the most laps (112 of 160).

=== Busch Nashville 420 ===
The Busch Nashville 420 was held on July 10 at the Nashville Speedway. Morgan Shepherd won the first Winston Cup pole of his career (he would win 7 in his career) with a speed of 103.959 mph.

Top Ten

1. 11-Darrell Waltrip
2. 44-Terry Labonte
3. 33-Harry Gant
4. 3-Ricky Rudd
5. 2-Tim Richmond (R)
6. 50-Geoff Bodine (R)
7. 43-Richard Petty
8. 90-Jody Ridley
9. 15-Dale Earnhardt
10. 47-Ron Bouchard

Time of Race: 2 hours 53 minutes 35 seconds
Caution Flags: 5 for 24 laps
Margin of Victory: 1 lap

- Darrell Waltrip led 400 of 420 laps for his sixth Winston Cup race victory of 1982.

=== Mountain Dew 500 ===
The Mountain Dew 500 was held on July 25 at the Pocono International Raceway. Cale Yarborough won the pole with a speed of 150.764 mph.

Top Ten

1. 88-Bobby Allison
2. 43-Richard Petty
3. 44-Terry Labonte
4. 47-Ron Bouchard
5. 28-Buddy Baker
6. 11-Darrell Waltrip
7. 75-Joe Ruttman
8. 71-Dave Marcis
9. 67-Buddy Arrington
10. 02-Mark Martin (R)

Time of Race: 4 hours 19 minutes 45 seconds
Caution Flags: 6 for 43 laps
Margin of Victory: 17 seconds

- Bobby Allison only led 16 laps but picked up his fifth Winston Cup race victory of 1982.
- Richard Petty led some 70 laps as the lead changed 46 times but had to pit for fuel with four laps remaining.
- Darrell Waltrip ran out of fuel coming out of turn one on the final lap.
- The race saw a 23 lap caution period when Dale Earnhardt and Tim Richmond blasted the first turn boilerplate wall and track crews had to weld it back in place.

=== Talladega 500 ===
The Talladega 500 was held on August 1 at the Alabama International Motor Speedway. Geoff Bodine won the second Winston Cup pole of his career with a speed of 199.4 mph.

Top Ten

1. 11-Darrell Waltrip
2. 28-Buddy Baker
3. 43-Richard Petty
4. 27-Cale Yarborough
5. 44-Terry Labonte
6. 9-Bill Elliott
7. 2-Tim Richmond (R)
8. 98-Morgan Shepherd
9. 3-Ricky Rudd
10. 88-Bobby Allison

Time of Race: 2 hours 58 minutes 26 seconds
Caution Flags: 5 for 25 laps
Margin of Victory: 1 car length

- Darrell Waltrip led 107 of 188 laps to pick up his seventh Winston Cup race victory of 1982.

=== Champion Spark Plug 400 ===
The Champion Spark Plug 400 was held on August 22 at the Michigan International Speedway. Just over a year after he won his first ever pole, Bill Elliott won the second Winston Cup pole of his career with a speed of 162.995 mph.

Top Ten

1. 88-Bobby Allison
2. 43-Richard Petty
3. 33-Harry Gant
4. 98-Geoff Bodine (R)
5. 55-Benny Parsons
6. 67-Buddy Arrington
7. 11-Darrell Waltrip
8. 71-Dave Marcis
9. 21-Neil Bonnett
10. 47-Ron Bouchard

Time of Race: 2 hours 45 minutes 53 seconds
Caution Flags: 5 for 29 laps
Margin of Victory: 2 car lengths

- Bobby Allison picked up his sixth Winston Cup race victory of 1982.
- Buddy Arrington's 6th place finish (and 5th place start) would be his best finish of the season.

=== Busch 500 ===
The Busch 500 was held on August 28 at the Bristol International Raceway. Rookie Tim Richmond won his first Winston Cup pole of his career at a speed of 112.507 mph.

Top Ten

1. 11-Darrell Waltrip
2. 88-Bobby Allison
3. 33-Harry Gant
4. 44-Terry Labonte
5. 98-Morgan Shepherd
6. 15-Dale Earnhardt
7. 3-Ricky Rudd
8. 90-Jody Ridley
9. 28-Buddy Baker
10. 50-Geoff Bodine (R)

Time of Race: 2 hours 49 minutes 32 seconds
Caution Flags: 3 for 15 laps
Margin of Victory: 0.70 seconds

- Darrell Waltrip picked up his eighth Winston Cup race victory of 1982. Bobby Allison would lead 169 laps but finish second.

=== Southern 500 ===
The Southern 500 was held on September 6 at the Darlington Raceway. David Pearson won the final pole of his Hall of Fame career with a speed of 155.739 mph.

Top Ten

1. 27-Cale Yarborough
2. 43-Richard Petty
3. 15-Dale Earnhardt
4. 9-Bill Elliott
5. 28-Buddy Baker
6. 17-Lake Speed
7. 50-Geoff Bodine (R)
8. 55-Benny Parsons
9. 67-Buddy Arrington
10. 71-Dave Marcis

Time of Race: 4 hours 21 minutes 32 seconds
Caution Flags: 14 for 87 laps
Margin of Victory: 0.79 seconds

- Cale Yarborough picked up his third Winston Cup race victory of 1982. It was his last victory with the M.C. Anderson Racing team.
- The lead changed 41 times among 17 drivers, the most competitive running in the event's history.

=== Wrangler Sanfor-Set 400 ===
The Wrangler Sanfor-Set 400 was held on September 12 at the Richmond Fairgrounds Raceway. Bobby Allison won the pole with a speed of 93.435 mph.

Top Ten

1. 88-Bobby Allison
2. 2-Tim Richmond (R)
3. 11-Darrell Waltrip
4. 3-Ricky Rudd
5. 21-Neil Bonnett
6. 44-Terry Labonte
7. 33-Harry Gant
8. 71-Dave Marcis
9. 28-Buddy Baker
10. 17-Lake Speed

Time of Race: 2 hours 37 minutes 6 seconds
Caution Flags: 2 for 12 laps
Margin of Victory: 17 seconds

- Bobby Allison led the most laps (265 of 400) and picked up his seventh Winston Cup race victory of 1982.

=== CRC Chemicals 500 ===
The CRC Chemicals 500 was held on September 19 at the Dover Downs International Speedway. Ricky Rudd won the pole with a speed of 139.384 mph.

Top Ten

1. 11-Darrell Waltrip
2. 42-Kyle Petty
3. 9-Bill Elliott
4. 50-Geoff Bodine (R)
5. 55-Benny Parsons
6. 71-Dave Marcis
7. 67-Buddy Arrington
8. 47-Ron Bouchard
9. 2-Tim Richmond (R)
10. 88-Bobby Allison

Time of Race: 4 hours 38 minutes 43 seconds
Caution Flags: 9 for 67 laps
Margin of Victory: 2 car lengths

- Darrell Waltrip led the most laps (287 of 500) and picked up his ninth Winston Cup race victory of 1982.

=== Holly Farms 400 ===
The Holly Farms 400 was held on October 3 at the North Wilkesboro Speedway. Darrell Waltrip won the pole with a speed of 113.86 mph.

Top Ten

1. 11-Darrell Waltrip
2. 33-Harry Gant
3. 44-Terry Labonte
4. 43-Richard Petty
5. 50-Geoff Bodine (R)
6. 75-Joe Ruttman
7. 47-Ron Bouchard
8. 17-Lake Speed
9. 90-Jody Ridley
10. 42-Kyle Petty

Time of Race: 2 hours 32 minutes 57 seconds
Caution Flags: 4 for 26 laps
Margin of Victory: 13.8 seconds

- Darrell Waltrip for the second race in a row led the most laps (329 of 400 laps) and picked up the victory, his tenth Winston Cup race victory of 1982.
- The only other lap leader was Bobby Allison who led 71 laps but only completed 141 laps before having an engine problem.

=== National 500 ===
The National 500 was held on October 10 at the Charlotte Motor Speedway. Darrell Waltrip won the pole with a speed of 164.694 mph.

Top Ten

1. 33-Harry Gant
2. 9-Bill Elliott
3. 03-David Pearson
4. 75-Joe Ruttman
5. 55-Benny Parsons
6. 28-Buddy Baker
7. 90-Jody Ridley
8. 43-Richard Petty
9. 88-Bobby Allison
10. 62-Rick Wilson

Time of Race: 3 hours 39 minutes 5 seconds
Caution Flags: 6 for 34 laps
Margin of Victory: 2.93 seconds

- Harry Gant won his second Winston Cup race of 1982 (also second win of his career) after Bobby Allison, who led the most laps (280 of 334 laps), blew his engine with ten laps remaining.
- This was Gant's first victory from pole position.
- This was also David Pearson's 300th Winston Cup top five finish.
- This was also Jody Ridley's 100th Winston Cup start.
- Richard Petty finished eighth despite damage in a ten-car crash started by Dale Earnhardt; Petty was unusually angry when Earnhardt blamed Petty for the crash.

=== Old Dominion 500 ===
The Old Dominion 500 was held on October 17 at the Martinsville Speedway. Ricky Rudd won the pole with a speed of 89.132 mph.

Top Ten

1. 11-Darrell Waltrip
2. 3-Ricky Rudd
3. 43-Richard Petty
4. 44-Terry Labonte
5. 75-Joe Ruttman
6. 28-Buddy Baker
7. 90-Jody Ridley
8. 33-Harry Gant
9. 52-Jimmy Means
10. 67-Buddy Arrington

Time of Race: 3 hours 41 minutes 5 seconds
Caution Flags: 10 for 70 laps
Margin of Victory: 2 seconds

- Darrell Waltrip led the most laps (238 of 500) and picked up his eleventh Winston Cup race victory of 1982.
- Bobby Allison blew an engine after leading 98 laps and finished 19th.
- Waltrip came into this race trailing Allison by 37 points. His victory and Allison's retirement meant Waltrip took over the points lead for the first time all season. Waltrip left Martinsville holding a 37-point lead over Allison.

=== Warner W. Hodgdon American 500 ===
The Warner W. Hodgdon American 500 was held on October 31 at the North Carolina Motor Speedway. Cale Yarborough won the pole with a speed of 143.22 mph.

Top Ten

1. 11-Darrell Waltrip
2. 88-Bobby Allison
3. 21-Neil Bonnett
4. 44-Terry Labonte
5. 98-Morgan Shepherd
6. 43-Richard Petty
7. 88-Buddy Baker
8. 47-Ron Bouchard
9. 48-Lennie Pond
10. 6-D. K. Ulrich

Time of Race: 4 hours 20 minutes 47 seconds
Caution Flags: 8 for 55 laps
Margin of Victory: 9.5 seconds

- Darrell Waltrip won his twelfth (and last for 1982) Winston Cup race of 1982.
- Bobby Allison led the most laps (127 of 492 laps) but spun out of the pits on Lap 450. He recovered for a 2nd place finish but the difference between he & Waltrip would remain unchanged at 37 points.
- Wood Brothers Racing with Neil Bonnett led 108 laps. Wood Brothers prepared cars would not lead 100 laps or more in a Cup Series race again until 2017 when Ryan Blaney led for 148 laps at Texas.

=== Atlanta Journal 500 ===
The Atlanta Journal 500 was held on November 7 at the Atlanta International Raceway. Morgan Shepherd won the pole with a speed of 166.779 mph.

Top Ten

1. 88-Bobby Allison
2. 33-Harry Gant
3. 11-Darrell Waltrip
4. 2-Tim Richmond (R)
5. 75-Joe Ruttman
6. 71-Dave Marcis
7. 3-Ricky Rudd
8. 44-Terry Labonte
9. 5-Rodney Combs
10. 02-Mark Martin (R)

Time of Race: 3 hours 48 minutes 51 seconds
Caution Flags: 10 for 56 laps
45 lead changes among 14 drivers
Margin of Victory: 0.5 seconds

- Bobby Allison led the most laps (100 of 328) and won his eighth Winston Cup race victory of 1982.
- This was the final Winston Cup race for country singer Marty Robbins before his death in December 1982.
- Rodney Combs made his first NASCAR start in this race.
- Heading into the season finale at Riverside, Waltrip had a 22 point lead over Allison.
- This was Cale Yarborough's last race in the M. C. Anderson #27. He would complete 73 laps before blowing an engine finishing 35th. He would join Mizlou as the Driver Expert for the season finale at Riverside.
- This race marked the last time the number 42 was run by a Petty-owned team until 2022, with Kyle Petty finishing 31st after engine problems. The team would not enter the next race at Riverside, and the number would be changed to #7 for 1983.

=== Winston Western 500 ===
The Winston Western 500 was held on November 21 at the Riverside International Raceway. He had already locked up the season long pole award for winning the most poles but Darrell Waltrip added one more to his tally for his seventh pole of 1982 with a speed of 114.995 mph.

Top Ten

1. 2-Tim Richmond (R)
2. 3-Ricky Rudd
3. 11-Darrell Waltrip
4. 21-Neil Bonnett
5. 02-Mark Martin (R)
6. 47-Ron Bouchard
7. 55-Benny Parsons
8. 98-Morgan Shepherd
9. 90-Jody Ridley
10. 16-Jim Bown

Time of Race: 3 hours 7 minutes 24 seconds
Caution Flags: 3 for 16 laps
Margin of Victory: 7 seconds

- Tim Richmond led the most laps (92 of 119) and won his second Winston Cup race victory of 1982, sweeping Both Riverside races of 1982. It was his final victory with the J. D. Stacy team.
- Bobby Allison's title hopes ended on lap 111 of 119 when his engine failed - the fourth time in the last six races where engine trouble ended his race - and he finished 16th. It was Allison's last race with the number 88 and the last with sponsor Gatorade. Next season he would use number 22 and retain Miller High Life for sponsorship while staying with DiGard Racing.
- Waltrip won his second straight title by 72 points over Allison.
- By virture of finishing 8th & Dale Earnhardt finishing last (42nd), Morgan Shepherd was able to get to 10th in points while Earnhardt fell to 12th in the final standings. Jimmy Means finishing 12th in the race was the other reason for the 12th place final points standings as Means took 11th in the final standings, a career-best in the standings.
- Conversely; Dale Earnhardt's 12th place finish in the standings would be the worst points finish of his career. A feat he would match in 1992, also recording only one victory that season as well.
- This would be the last full time (entire season) race for Mark Martin in the Cup Series until 1988.
- For the second straight season, Terry Labonte failed to win a race. However his consistency paid off with 3rd place in the final drivers points standings.
- For the first time since the 1978 season, Richard Petty would fail to win a race.

== Full Drivers' Championship ==
(key) Bold – Pole position awarded by time. Italics – Pole position set by owner's points. * – Most laps led.

| Pos. | Driver | DAY | RCH | BRI | ATL | CAR | DAR | NWS | MAR | TAL | NSV | DOV | CLT | POC | RIV | MCH | DAY | NSV | POC | TAL | MCH | BRI | DAR | RCH | DOV | NWS | CLT | MAR | CAR | ATL | RIV | Pts |
|---|---|---|---|---|---|---|---|---|---|---|---|---|---|---|---|---|---|---|---|---|---|---|---|---|---|---|---|---|---|---|---|---|
| 1 | Darrell Waltrip | 20 | **27** | **1*** | 1 | 7* | 23 | **1*** | 5 | 1 | **1*** | **15** | 22 | 13 | 32 | 2 | 36 | 1* | 6 | 1* | 7 | 1 | 24 | 3 | 1* | **1*** | 14 | 1* | 1 | 3 | **3** | 4489 |
| 2 | Bobby Allison | 1* | 8 | 5 | 22 | 4 | 25 | 8 | 17 | 13 | 6 | 1* | 3 | 1 | 27 | 4 | 1* | 19 | 1 | 10 | 1* | 2* | 20 | **1*** | 10 | 23 | 9* | 19 | 2* | 1* | 16 | 4417 |
| 3 | Terry Labonte | 4 | 5 | 4 | 8 | 2 | 6 | 2 | **20** | 2 | 2 | 4 | 34 | 5 | **2*** | 28 | 27 | 2 | 3 | 5 | 21 | 4 | 35 | 6 | 27 | 3 | 16 | 4 | 4 | 8 | 27 | 4211 |
| 4 | Harry Gant | 7 | 30 | 6 | 5 | 8 | 19 | 6 | 1* | 14 | 29 | 30 | 13 | 4 | 35 | 10 | 24 | 3 | 22 | 38 | 3 | 3 | 11 | 7 | 12 | 2 | **1** | 8 | 32 | 2 | 26 | 3877 |
| 5 | Richard Petty | 27 | 2 | 7 | 2 | 30 | 31 | 5 | 15 | 27 | 9 | 24 | 8 | 7 | 36 | 26 | 25 | 7 | 2* | 3 | 2 | 26 | 2 | 13 | 30 | 4 | 8 | 3 | 6 | 15 | 31 | 3814 |
| 6 | Dave Marcis | 24 | 1 | 10 | 12 | 21 | 27 | 29 | 6 | 30 | 8 | 2 | 9 | 10 | 30 | 14 | 10 | 11 | 8 | 13 | 8 | 21 | 10 | 8 | 6 | 11 | 32 | 28 | 11 | 6 | 29 | 3666 |
| 7 | Buddy Arrington | 15 | 14 | 15 | 14 | 9 | 8 | 16 | 8 | 11 | 14 | 11 | 11 | 12 | 15 | 15 | 12 | 22 | 9 | 20 | 6 | 16 | 9 | 16 | 7 | 21 | 22 | 10 | 23 | 14 | 35 | 3642 |
| 8 | Ron Bouchard | 6 | 9 | 8 | 36 | 16 | 34 | 13 | 19 | 36 | 3 | 6 | 10 | 31 | 9 | **12** | 3 | 10 | 4 | 34 | 10 | 12 | 26 | 15 | 8 | 7 | 35 | 14 | 8 | 32 | 6 | 3545 |
| 9 | Ricky Rudd | 35 | 22 | 27 | 25 | 15 | 29 | 9 | 4 | 24 | 19 | 22 | 7 | 6 | 29 | 5 | 7 | 4 | 31 | 9 | 14 | 7 | 31 | 4 | **11** | 25 | 31 | **2** | 28 | 7 | 2 | 3537 |
| 10 | Morgan Shepherd | 19 | 10 | 3 | 6 | 5 | 30 | 7 | 26 | 5 | 15 | 7 | 19 | 35 | | 8 | 4 | **26** | 28 | 8 | 32 | 5 | 36 | 12 | 24 | 13 | 30 | 18 | 5 | **25** | 8 | 3451 |
| 11 | Jimmy Means | 17 | 18 | 16 | 16 | 17 | 11 | 18 | 13 | 9 | 23 | 31 | 14 | 24 | 18 | 20 | 21 | 14 | 17 | 17 | 11 | 14 | 23 | 19 | 17 | 14 | 11 | 9 | 15 | 13 | 12 | 3423 |
| 12 | Dale Earnhardt | 36 | 4 | 2* | **28** | 25 | 1* | 3 | 23 | 8 | 10 | 3 | 30* | 34 | 4 | 7 | 29 | 9 | 25 | 35 | 30 | 6 | 3 | 27 | 20 | 20 | 25 | 27 | 14 | 34 | 42 | 3402 |
| 13 | Jody Ridley | 9 | 13 | 20 | 17 | 33 | 22 | 17 | 12 | 38 | 13 | 17 | 6 | 9 | 7 | 27 | 15 | 8 | 36 | 14 | 26 | 8 | 28 | 25 | 25 | 9 | 7 | 7 | 31 | 28 | 9 | 3333 |
| 14 | Mark Martin **(R)** | 30 | 26 | 14 | 19 | 32 | 7 | 25 | 7 | 10 | 12 | 5 | 27 | 26 | 8 | 33 | 31 | 15 | 10 | 12 | 34 | 11 | 22 | 26 | 33 | 12 | 38 | 20 | 24 | 10 | 5 | 3042 |
| 15 | Kyle Petty | 23 | 20 | 11 | 26 | 27 | 18 | 14 | 27 | 4 | 27 | 29 | 17 | 11 | 12 | 6 | 38 | 23 | 15 | 39 | 15 | 30 | 14 | 14 | 2 | 10 | 29 | 21 | 29 | 31 | | 3024 |
| 16 | Joe Ruttman | 3 | 15 | 18 | 29 | 24 | | 12 | 14 | 22 | 4 | 18 | 41 | 30 | 26 | 13 | 40 | 12 | 7 | 11 | 38 | 24 | 13 | 31 | 18 | 6 | 4 | 5 | 18 | 5 | 40 | 3021 |
| 17 | Neil Bonnett | 25 | 7 | 22 | 27 | 19 | 24 | 10 | 3 | 19 | 5 | 19 | 1 | | 5 | 11 | 32 | | | 16 | 9 | | 34 | 5 | 21 | | 28 | 22 | 3 | 11 | 4 | 2966 |
| 18 | Benny Parsons | **26** | 3* | 9 | 4 | **3** | 4 | 4 | 29 | **3*** | 22 | 20 | 39 | 3 | 23 | 32 | 28 | | | | 5 | | 8 | | 5 | | 5 | | 34 | 20 | 7 | 2892 |
| 19 | J. D. McDuffie | 13 | 23 | 19 | 38 | 10 | 36 | 20 | 16 | 18 | 18 | 27 | 33 | 33 | 25 | 37 | 11 | 25 | 16 | 22 | 16 | 22 | 16 | 30 | 13 | 30 | 18 | 15 | 22 | 30 | 18 | 2886 |
| 20 | Lake Speed | 41 | 19 | 29 | 33 | 34 | 17 | 24 | 24 | 34 | 30 | 10 | 12 | 20 | 31 | 34 | 9 | 13 | 33 | 21 | 12 | 13 | 6 | 10 | 22 | 8 | 21 | 29 | 33 | 29 | 32 | 2850 |
| 21 | Tommy Gale | 16 | 21 | 17 | 37 | 11 | 12 | DNQ | | 16 | 16 | 13 | 23 | 18 | Wth | 18 | 14 | 18 | 23 | 29 | 20 | 19 | 29 | 21 | 14 | 19 | 36 | 17 | 16 | 26 | | 2698 |
| 22 | Geoff Bodine **(R)** | 42 | | | | | | 15 | 25 | 33 | 21 | 21 | 25 | 8 | 3 | 9 | **6** | 6 | 11 | **15** | 4 | 10 | 7 | 28 | 4 | 5 | 13 | 11 | 27 | 19 | 11 | 2654 |
| 23 | Buddy Baker | 8 | | | 30 | 14 | **37** | | 28 | 25 | | | 5 | 22 | | 31 | 8 | 24 | 5 | 2 | 25 | 9 | 5 | 9 | 29 | 24 | 6 | 6 | 7 | 21 | | 2591 |
| 24 | D. K. Ulrich | | 29 | 26 | 32 | 26 | 15 | 19 | 31 | 15 | 26 | 14 | 28 | 15 | 16 | 22 | | 17 | | | | 18 | 27 | 20 | 19 | 15 | 15 | 12 | 10 | 23 | 15 | 2566 |
| 25 | Bill Elliott | 5 | 12 | | 21 | 23 | 3 | | | 26 | 11 | | 2 | 19 | | 3 | 2 | 21 | 30 | 6 | **27** | | 4 | | 3 | | 2 | | 12 | 24 | 25 | 2558 |
| 26 | Tim Richmond | DNQ | | | | 31 | 5 | 11 | 18 | 7 | 7 | 9 | 40 | 2 | 1 | 25 | 23 | 5 | 24 | 7 | 23 | **25** | 30 | 2 | 9 | 22 | 19 | 13 | 17 | 4 | 1* | 2497 |
| 27 | Cale Yarborough | 2 | | | 3 | 1 | 2 | | | 37 | | | 4 | 28 | | 1* | 22 | | **26** | 4 | 28 | | 1* | | | | 33 | | **25** | 35 | | 2022 |
| 28 | James Hylton | DNQ | | | | | | | | | 17 | 12 | | | | 23 | 19 | 20 | 12 | 25 | 22 | 23 | 18 | 17 | 15 | 17 | | 16 | | | | 1514 |
| 29 | Slick Johnson | DNQ | 17 | 21 | | 18 | 26 | 30 | 10 | 12 | 25 | 16 | 18 | 29 | Wth | 30 | 34 | 28 | | 32 | | | 32 | | | | DNQ | | 19 | | | 1261 |
| 30 | Ronnie Thomas | DNQ | | 25 | | 20 | 13 | 23 | | | 24 | 23 | | 23 | | 35 | | | 32 | | 17 | 28 | 38 | 23 | 31 | 29 | 37 | 25 | 30 | | | 1093 |
| 31 | Bobby Wawak | 32 | | DNQ | | 28 | 21 | | | | | | 20 | 14 | | | | | 19 | 26 | DNQ | | 21 | | | | DNQ | | 13 | 17 | | 1002 |
| 32 | Brad Teague **(R)** | DNQ | | 12 | 13 | | | 22 | 11 | | 20 | 25 | 24 | 25 | | | | | | | | 15 | | | | | | | | | | 966 |
| 33 | Lennie Pond | | 24 | | | Wth | 10 | 26 | 22 | 31 | | | 31 | | Wth | | 16 | 27 | | 36 | | | 40 | DNQ | | | 20 | | 9 | 12 | | 756 |
| 34 | Rick Wilson | 18 | | | 9 | | | | | 32 | | | 36 | | | | 33 | | | 27 | | | | | | | 10 | | | 27 | | 731 |
| 35 | Joe Millikan | 40 | 6 | 13 | 24 | 6 | 16 | | | | | | | | | | | | | | | | QL | | | | | QL | 26 | | | 678 |
| 36 | Rick Newsom | Wth | | | | | 14 | DNQ | | | | | | 17 | | | | | 13 | | | 29 | 19 | DNQ | 35 | | DNQ | 31 | 35 | DNQ | | 619 |
| 37 | David Pearson | | | | | | | | | | | | **21** | | | 36 | 5 | | | | 31 | | **37** | | | | 3 | | Wth | | | 613 |
| 38 | Gary Balough | 11 | 32 | 23 | 7 | 12 | | | | | | | | | | | | | | | | | | | | | | | | | | 564 |
| 39 | Lowell Cowell | 14 | | | | | | | | 21 | | | | 21 | | | 13 | | | 18 | | | | | | | | | | | | 554 |
| 40 | Philip Duffie | | | | | | | | | 17 | | | | | | | 18 | | | 23 | | | 17 | | | | DNQ | | | 16 | | 542 |
| 41 | H. B. Bailey | | | | | | 35 | | | | | | 26 | | | 21 | | | | | 35 | | 29 | | | | 26 | | | | | 462 |
| 42 | Butch Lindley | | | | | | | 28 | 2 | | | | | | | | | | | | | | | 24 | | | | 26 | | | | 435 |
| 43 | Dean Combs | | | | | | | | | | | | 38 | | | 17 | | | | | 13 | | | | | 26 | 34 | | | | | 431 |
| 44 | Delma Cowart | 33 | | | 23 | | | | | | | | 32 | | | | 17 | | | 30 | | | | | | | DNQ | | | | | 410 |
| 45 | Donnie Allison | 34 | | | 11 | 22 | 9 | | 30 | 6 | | 8 | 37 | | Wth | | | | | | | | | | | | | | | 38 | | 406 |
| 46 | Bobby Hillin Jr. | | | | | | | 21 | | | | | | 36 | | 16 | 20 | | | 19 | | | | | | | | | | | | 379 |
| 47 | Roy Smith | 10 | | | | | | | | | | | | | 6 | | | | | | | | | | | | | | | | 24 | 375 |
| 48 | Dick Brooks | 38 | | 28 | 34 | Wth | 32 | | | | | | | | | | | | | | | | | | | | 24 | | | | | 347 |
| 49 | Connie Saylor | DNQ | | | 31 | | | | | | | | 15 | | | | 39 | | | 37 | | 20 | 12 | | | | 39 | | | | | 335 |
| 50 | Darryl Sage | | | | | | | | | | | | | | | | | 16 | | | | 17 | | 18 | | | | 30 | | 22 | | 324 |
| 51 | Travis Tiller | Wth | | | | | | | | | | | | | | | 26 | | | 28 | | | | | | | 40 | | | 18 | | 316 |
| 52 | Bob Schacht | | 16 | | | | | 27 | 21 | | DNQ | | | | | | | | | | | | | | | | | | | | | 297 |
| 53 | Tom Sneva | 22 | 31 | | 15 | QL | | | | | | | | | | | | | | | | | | | | | | | | | | 285 |
| 54 | Rick McCray | | | | | | | | | | | | | | 14 | | | | | | | | | | | | | | | | 34 | 282 |
| 55 | Dick May | Wth | | 30 | 20 | 13 | 20 | DNQ | | | | | | | | 19 | | | | | | | 15 | | 23 | | | | | 37 | | 282 |
| 56 | Jim Bown | | | | | | | | | | | | | | 17 | | | | | | | | | | | | | | | | 10 | 246 |
| 57 | Jim Reich | | | | | | | | | | | | | | 10 | | | | | | | | | | | | | | | | 19 | 240 |
| 58 | John Callis | | | | | | | | | | | 32 | | | | | | | 27 | | | | | | 26 | | DNQ | | | DNQ | | 234 |
| 59 | Steve Moore | Wth | | | 18 | | | | | 35 | | | 35 | | | | | | | | | | | | | | DNQ | | | 40 | | 230 |
| 60 | Jimmy Walker | | | | | | | | | | | 28 | | 37 | | | | | | | | | | | | 28 | | | | | | 210 |
| 61 | Jocko Maggiacomo | | | | | | | | | | | 26 | | 32 | | | | | 34 | | | | | | 28 | | | | | DNQ | | 207 |
| 62 | Jim Sauter | 12 | | | 10 | | 33 | | | | | | | | | | | | | | | | | | | | | | | | | 201 |
| 63 | Don Waterman | | | | | | | | | | | | | | 11 | | | | | | | | | | | | | | | | 33 | 199 |
| 64 | Bill Schmitt | | | | | | | | | | | | | | 24 | | | | | | | | | | | | | | | | 21 | 191 |
| 65 | Rusty Wallace | 37 | | | 35 | | | | | | | | 29 | | | | | | | | | | | | | | | | | | | 186 |
| 66 | Jim Robinson | | | | | | | | | | | | | | 28 | | | | | | | | | | | | | | | | 20 | 182 |
| 67 | John Krebs | | | | | | | | | | | | | | 19 | | | | | | | | | | | | | | | | 37 | 158 |
| 68 | Elliott Forbes-Robinson | 28 | | | 40 | | | | | 29 | | | | | | | | | | | | | | | | | | | | | | 155 |
| 69 | Jim Lee | | | | | | | | | | | | | | 34 | | | | | | | | | | | | | | | | 23 | 155 |
| 70 | A. J. Foyt | 21 | | | 39 | | | | | | | | | | | | | | | | | | | | | | | | | | | 146 |
| 71 | Rodney Combs | | | | | | | | | | | | | | | | | | | | | | | | | | | | | 9 | | 143 |
| 72 | Mark Stahl | | | | | | | | | | | | | | 22 | | | | | | | | | | | | | | | | 39 | 143 |
| 73 | Hershel McGriff | | | | | | | | | | | | | | 33 | | | | | | | | | | | | | | | | 28 | 143 |
| 74 | Robin McCall | | | | | | | | | | | | DNQ | | | 29 | | | | | 33 | | | | | | DNQ | | | | | 140 |
| 75 | Tommy Ellis | DNQ | 11 | | | | | | | | | | | | | | | | | | | | | 11 | | | | | | | | 130 |
| 76 | Rick Baldwin | | | | | | | | | | | | | | | | | | | | | | | | | | 12 | | | | | 127 |
| 77 | Scott Miller | | | | | | | | | | | | | | 13 | | | | | | | | | | | | | | | | | 124 |
| 78 | Glenn Francis | | | | | | | | | | | | | | | | | | | | | | | | | | | | | | 14 | 121 |
| 79 | Marty Robbins | | | | | | | | | | | | | | | | 37 | | | | DNQ | | | | | | | | | 33 | | 116 |
| 80 | Jeff McDuffie | | | | | | | | | | | | | | | | | | | | | | | | | 16 | DNQ | | | | | 115 |
| 81 | Al Loquasto | | | | | | | | | | | | | 16 | | | | | 29 | 24 | 36 | 27 | | | | | | | | | | 115 |
| 82 | Cecil Gordon | | | DNQ | | | | | | | | | | | | | | | 14 | | | | | | 16 | 18 | | QL | | DNQ | 17 | 109 |
| 83 | John Anderson | | | | | | 28 | | | 20 | | | 42 | | | | | | | | | | | | | | 17 | | | | | 103 |
| 84 | Randy Baker | | | | | | | | | | | | | | | | | | | | | | | | | | | | 20 | | | 103 |
| 85 | Don Puskarich | | | | | | | | | | | | | | 20 | | | | | | | | | | | | | | | | | 103 |
| 86 | Trevor Boys | | | | | | | | | | | | | | | | | | | | | | | | | | | | | | 22 | 97 |
| 87 | John McFadden | | | 24 | | | | | | | | | | | | | | | | | | | | | | | DNQ | | | DNQ | | 91 |
| 88 | Tommy Houston | | 25 | | | | | | | | | | | | | | | | | | | | | | | | | | | | | 88 |
| 89 | Richard Brickhouse | | | | | | | | | | | | | | | | | | | | | | | | | | 27 | | 21 | DNQ | | 82 |
| 90 | Steve Gray | | | | | | | | | | | | | 27 | | | | | | | | | | | | | | | | | | 82 |
| 91 | Joe Fields | | 28 | | | | | | | | | | | | | | | | | | | | | 22 | | | | 24 | | DNQ | | 79 |
| 92 | Bob Jarvis | | | | | | | DNQ | | | 28 | | | | | | 35 | | | | | | | | | | | | | | | 79 |
| 93 | Bill Scott | DNQ | | | | | | | | 28 | | | | | | | | | | | DNQ | | | | | | | | | | | 79 |
| 94 | Ernie Cline | | | | | 29 | | | | | | | | | | | | | | | | | | | | | | | | | | 76 |
| 95 | Blackie Wangerin | DNQ | | | | | | | | | | | | | | | 30 | | | | | | | | | | DNQ | | | | | 73 |
| 96 | Stan Barrett | 31 | | | | | | | | | | | | | | | | | | | | | | | | | | | | | | 70 |
| 97 | Mike Potter | | | | | | | | | | | | | | | | | | 20 | | | | 33 | | | | DNQ | | | DNQ | | 64 |
| 98 | Bob Slawinski | DNQ | | | | | | | | | | | | | | | | | | 33 | DNQ | | | | | | | | | | | 64 |
| 99 | Gil Roth | | | | | | | | | | | | | | | | | | | | DNQ | | | | 34 | | | | | | | 61 |
| 100 | Tom Hessert Jr. | | | | | | | | | | | | | | | | | | 35 | | | | | | | | | | | | | 58 |
| 101 | Derrike Cope | | | | | | | | | | | | | | | | | | | | | | | | | | | | | | 36 | 55 |
| 102 | Earle Canavan | | | | | | | | | | | | | | | | | | | | 37 | | 39 | | | | | | | | | 52 |
| 103 | Randy Becker | | | | | | | | | | | | | | 21 | | | | | | | | | | | | | | | | 38 | 49 |
| 104 | Billie Harvey | 39 | | | | | | | | | | | | | | | | | | | | | | | | | | | | | | 46 |
| 105 | Glenn Jarrett | | | | | | | | | | | | | | | | | | | | | | | | | | | | | 39 | | 46 |
| 106 | David Simko | DNQ | | | | | | | | 40 | | | | | | | | | | | 29 | | | | | | | | | | | 43 |
| 107 | Kevin Terris | | | | | | | | | | | | | | | | | | | | | | | | | | | | | | 41 | 40 |
| 108 | Jimmy Hensley | | | | | | | | 9 | | | | | | | | | | | | | | | 29 | | | | 23 | | | | |
| 109 | Charlie Baker | | | | | | | | | | | | | | | | | | 18 | 31 | 19 | | | | | | DNQ | | | | | |
| 110 | Joe Booher | DNQ | | | | | | | | | | | | | | | | | 21 | | 18 | | | | | | | | | DNQ | | |
| 111 | Terry Herman | | | | | | | | | | | | | | | | | | | | | | | | | | | | | | 13 | |
| 112 | Bosco Lowe | | | | | | | | | | | | 16 | | | | | | | | | | | | | | | | | | | |
| 113 | Ferrel Harris | DNQ | | | | | | | | 23 | | | | | | | | | | | | | | | | | | | | | | |
| 114 | Sterling Marlin | DNQ | | | | | | | | | | | | | | | | | | | | | | | | | 23 | | | | | |
| 115 | Tony Bettenhausen Jr. | | | | | | | | | | | | | | | | | | | | 24 | | | | | | | | | | | |
| 116 | Dennis DeVea | | | | | | | | | | | | | | | 24 | | | | | | | | | | | | | | DNQ | | |
| 117 | Joel Stowe | DNQ | | | | | | | | | | | | | | | | | | | | | | | | 27 | | | | | | |
| 118 | Tighe Scott | 29 | | | | | | | | | | | | | | | | | | | | | | | | | | | | | | |
| 119 | Jimmy Insolo | | | | | | | | | | | | | | | | | | | | | | | | | | | | | | 30 | |
| 120 | J. R. Charbonneau | | | | | | | | | | | | | | | | | | | | | | | | 32 | | | | | | | |
| 121 | Jerry Bowman | | | | | | | | | | | | | | | | | | | | | | | | | | | | | 36 | | |
| 122 | L. W. Wright | | | | | | | | | 39 | DNQ | | | | | | | | | | | | | | | | | | | | | |
| 123 | Jim Hurlbert | | | | | | | | | | | | | | | | | | | 40 | | | | | | | | | | | | |
| 124 | Dick Skillen | DNQ | | | | | | | | | | | | | | | | | | | | | | | | | | | | | | |
| 125 | Bob Riley | DNQ | | | | | | | | | | | | | | | | | | | | | | | | | | | | | | |
| 126 | Ronnie Sanders | DNQ | | | | | | | | | | | | | | | | | | | | | | | | | | | | | | |
| 127 | John Haver | DNQ | | | | | | | | | | | | | | | | | | | | | | | | | DNQ | | | | | |
| 128 | Bill Meazel | DNQ | | | | | | | | | | | | | | | | | | | | | | | | | | | | DNQ | | |
| 129 | Bob Kennedy | | | | | | | | | | | | | | DNQ | | | | | | | | | | | | | | | | | |
| 130 | Ed Baugess | | | | | | | | | | | | | | | | | | | | | | | | | | DNQ | | | | | |
| 131 | Billy McGinnis | | | | | | | | | | | | | | | | | | | | | | | | | | | | | DNQ | | |
| 132 | Paul Simms | | | | | | | | | | | | | | | | | | | | | | | | | | | | | DNQ | | |
| 133 | Clive Skilton | | | | | | | | | | | | | | | | | | | | | | | | | | | | | | DNQ | |
| 134 | Don Whittington | Wth | | | | | | | | | | | | | | | | | | | | | | | | | | | | | | |
| 135 | Joey Arrington | Wth | | | | | | | | | | | | | | | | | | | | | | | | | | | | | | |
| 136 | Bill Hollar | Wth | | | | | | | | | | | | | | | | | | | | | | | | | | | | | | |
| 137 | Alan West | | | | | | | | | | | | | | | | | | | | | | | | | | | | | | | |
| 138 | Steve Pfeifer | | | | | | | | | | | | | | Wth | | | | | | | | | | | | | | | | | |
| 139 | Don Stanley | | | | | | | | | | | | | | Wth | | | | | | | | | | | | | | | | | |
| 140 | Sam Ard | | | | | | | | | | | | | | | | | | | | | | | | | | | Wth | | | | |
| Pos. | Driver | DAY | RCH | BRI | ATL | CAR | DAR | NWS | MAR | TAL | NSV | DOV | CLT | POC | RIV | MCH | DAY | NSV | POC | TAL | MCH | BRI | DAR | RCH | DOV | NWS | CLT | MAR | CAR | ATL | RIV | Pts |

== Rookie of the year ==
Geoff Bodine won the rookie of the year even though he only started 25 of the 30 races. However, he had 4 top fives, 10 top tens, 2 poles, and 118 laps led, he had a season long average finishing position of 15.16. Mark Martin, his closest competitor for the award, did start all 30 races but he only had 2 top fives, 8 top tens, 0 poles, and 4 laps led, he had a season long average finishing position of 19.47.

== See also ==
- 1982 NASCAR Budweiser Late Model Sportsman Series
- 1982 NASCAR Winston West Series
