= Jim Bown =

American racing driver (born 1960)

- Born: James Bown; June 24, 1960 (age 66); Portland, Oregon, U.S.

NASCAR Cup Series career
- 23 races run over 10 years
- Best finish: 56th (1982)
- First race: 1981 Warner W. Hodgdon 400 (Riverside)
- Last race: 1990 Atlanta Journal 500 (Atlanta)
Wins	Top tens	Poles
0	1	0

NASCAR O'Reilly Auto Parts Series career
- 122 races run over 10 years
- Best finish: 15th (1994)
- First race: 1991 Mountain Dew 400 (Hickory)
- Last race: 2000 All Pro Bumper to Bumper 300 (Lowe's)
Wins	Top tens	Poles
0	11	1

NASCAR FedEx Freight Truck Series career
- 1 race run over 1 year
- Best finish: 70th (1997)
- First race: 1997 Craftsman 200 (Portland)
Wins	Top tens	Poles
0	0	0

ARCA Menards Series West career
- 100 races run over 16 years
- Best finish: 3rd (1982)
- First race: 1978 Winston Evergreen 100 (Evergreen)
- Last race: 1995 Reser's Fine Foods 200 (Portland)
- First win: 1981 Juan De Fuca News 150 (Victoria)
- Last win: 1985 G.I. Joe's / Valvoline 201 (Portland)
Wins	Top tens	Poles
7	42	16
- Statistics up to date as of June 9, 2026.

Jim Bown (born June 24, 1960) is an American former stock car racing driver. He has run a total of 23 Winston Cup Series races. He scored one top-ten result, a tenth-place finish at Riverside International Raceway in 1982. In the NASCAR Busch Series, he competed in 122 races, with four top-fives and one pole. He also made one Craftsman Truck Series race in 1997 at Portland Speedway and he finished sixteenth.

Bown is the son of Dick Bown and younger brother of 1990 Busch champion Chuck Bown.

== Motorsports career results ==
=== NASCAR ===
(key) (Bold – Pole position awarded by qualifying time. Italics – Pole position earned by points standings or practice time. * – Most laps led.)

==== Winston Cup Series ====
NASCAR Winston Cup Series results
Year	Team	No.	Make	1	2	3	4	5	6	7	8	9	10	11	12	13	14	15	16	17	18	19	20	21	22	23	24	25	26	27	28	29	30	31	NWCC	Pts	Ref
1981	Bown Racing	16	Olds	RSD	DAY	RCH	CAR	ATL	BRI	NWS	DAR	MAR	TAL	NSV	DOV	CLT	TWS	RSD; 32	MCH	DAY	NSV	POC	TAL	MCH	BRI	DAR	RCH	DOV	MAR	NWS	CLT	CAR	ATL		75th	122	
1981	Bown Racing	16	Buick																															RSD; 36	75th	122	
1982	Bown Racing	16	Buick	DAY	RCH	BRI	ATL	CAR	DAR	NWS	MAR	TAL	NSV	DOV	CLT	POC	RSD; 17	MCH	DAY	NSV	POC	TAL	MCH	BRI	DAR	RCH	DOV	NWS	CLT	MAR	CAR	ATL	RSD; 10		56th	246	
1983	Bill Morehart	96	Buick	DAY	RCH	CAR	ATL	DAR	NWS	MAR	TAL	NSV	DOV	BRI	CLT	RSD; 23	POC	MCH	DAY	NSV	POC	TAL	MCH	BRI	DAR	RCH	DOV	MAR	NWS	CLT	CAR	ATL			74th	152	
1983	Kieper Racing	93	Buick																														RSD; 35		74th	152	
1984	Kieper Racing	93	Buick	DAY	RCH	CAR	ATL	BRI	NWS	DAR	MAR	TAL	NSV	DOV	CLT	RSD; 28	POC	MCH	DAY	NSV	POC	TAL	MCH	BRI	DAR	RCH	DOV	MAR	CLT	NWS	CAR	ATL	RSD; 36		69th	139	
1985	Kieper Racing	98	Buick	DAY	RCH	CAR	ATL	BRI	DAR	NWS	MAR	TAL	DOV	CLT	RSD; 28	POC	MCH	DAY	POC	TAL	MCH	BRI	DAR	RCH	DOV	MAR	NWS	CLT	CAR	ATL					59th	194	
1985	Kieper Racing	98	Chevy																												RSD; 16				59th	194	
1986	Kieper Racing	98	Chevy	DAY	RCH	CAR	ATL	BRI	DAR	NWS	MAR	TAL	DOV	CLT	RSD	POC	MCH	DAY	POC	TAL	GLN	MCH	BRI	DAR	RCH	DOV	MAR	NWS	CLT	CAR	ATL	RSD; 32			112th	67	
1987	Hamby Motorsports	12	Chevy	DAY	CAR	RCH	ATL	DAR	NWS	BRI	MAR	TAL	CLT	DOV	POC; 23																				93rd	70	
1987	Hamby Motorsports	12	Olds													RSD; 31	MCH	DAY	POC	TAL	GLN	MCH	BRI	DAR	RCH	DOV	MAR	NWS	CLT	CAR	RSD	ATL			93rd	70	
1988	Bown Racing	1	Chevy	DAY	RCH	CAR	ATL	DAR	BRI	NWS	MAR	TAL	CLT	DOV	RSD; 41	POC	MCH	DAY	POC	TAL	GLN	MCH	BRI	DAR	RCH	DOV	MAR	CLT	NWS	CAR	PHO; 42	ATL			76th	77	
1989	Bown Racing	41	Chevy	DAY; DNQ	CAR; 36	ATL; 41	RCH	DAR	BRI	NWS	MAR	TAL	CLT; DNQ	DOV	SON; 29	POC	MCH	DAY	POC	TAL	GLN	MCH	BRI	DAR	RCH	DOV	MAR	CLT	NWS						59th	-	
1989	AAG Racing	34	Buick																											CAR; 37	PHO	ATL			59th	-	
1990	U.S. Racing	2	Pontiac	DAY	RCH	CAR	ATL	DAR	BRI	NWS	MAR	TAL	CLT	DOV	SON; 22	POC	MCH	DAY	POC	TAL	GLN	MCH	BRI	DAR	RCH	DOV	MAR	NWS	CLT						61st	207	
1990	Osterlund Racing	57	Pontiac																											CAR; 27	PHO; 28	ATL; 39			61st	207	
1994	Kieper Racing	63	Chevy	DAY	CAR	RCH	ATL	DAR	BRI	NWS	MAR; DNQ	TAL	SON	CLT	DOV	POC	MCH	DAY	NHA	POC	TAL	IND	GLN	MCH	BRI	DAR	RCH	DOV	MAR	NWS	CLT	CAR	PHO	ATL	NA	-	
1996	Balough Racing	57	Chevy	DAY; DNQ	CAR	RCH	ATL	DAR	BRI	NWS	MAR	TAL	SON	CLT	DOV	POC	MCH	DAY	NHA	POC	TAL	IND	GLN	MCH	BRI	DAR	RCH	DOV	MAR	NWS	CLT	CAR	PHO	ATL	NA	-	

===== Daytona 500 =====
Year	Team	Manufacturer	Start	Finish
1989	Bown Racing	Chevy	DNQ	
1996	Balough Racing	Chevy	DNQ	

==== Busch Series ====
NASCAR Busch Series results
Year	Team	No.	Make	1	2	3	4	5	6	7	8	9	10	11	12	13	14	15	16	17	18	19	20	21	22	23	24	25	26	27	28	29	30	31	32	NBSC	Pts	Ref
1991	Bown Racing	16	Buick	DAY	RCH	CAR	MAR	VOL	HCY; 30	DAR	BRI	LAN; 27	SBO; 30	NZH	CLT	DOV	ROU; 27	HCY; 20	MYB	GLN	OXF	NHA	SBO; 23	DUB	IRP	ROU	BRI	DAR	RCH	DOV	CLT; 13	NHA	CAR; 17	MAR; DNQ		41st	743	
1992	Bown Racing	98	Chevy	DAY; 42		RCH; 14	ATL; 32		DAR; 33	BRI					CLT; 31	DOV	ROU	MYB	GLN	VOL	NHA	TAL; 15	IRP					DAR; 20			CLT; 35					20th	1793	
1992	Bown Racing	98	Buick		CAR; 13			MAR; 28			HCY; 20	LAN; 26	DUB; 22	NZH										ROU; 3	MCH	NHA	BRI		RCH; 12	DOV		MAR; 23	CAR; 14	**HCY**; 4		20th	1793	
1993	Bown Racing	98	Chevy	DAY; 34			DAR; 11	BRI; 32					CLT; 17	DOV				TAL; 30	IRP	MCH; 30	NHA		DAR; 36				CLT; DNQ	MAR	CAR; 21		ATL; 32					26th	1564	
1993	Bown Racing	98	Buick		CAR; 42	RCH; 13			HCY; 28	ROU; 26	MAR	NZH			MYB; 10	GLN	MLW					BRI; 27		RCH; 24	DOV	ROU; 15										26th	1564	
1993	Henderson Motorsports	75	Olds																											HCY; 29						26th	1564	
1994	HVP Motorsports	63	Chevy	DAY; 42	CAR; 14	RCH; 14	ATL; 24	MAR; 18	DAR; 33	HCY; 11	BRI; 5	ROU; 7	NHA; 21	NZH; 33	CLT; 18	DOV; 26	MYB; 8	GLN; 32	MLW; 13	SBO; 10	TAL; 39	HCY; 12	IRP; 34	MCH; 11	BRI; 11	DAR; 38	RCH; 27	DOV; 20	CLT; 6	MAR; 28	CAR; 22					15th	2853	
1995	Bown Racing	51	Chevy	DAY; 6	CAR; 21	RCH; 30	ATL; 3	NSV; 29	DAR; 15	BRI; 16	HCY; 9		NZH; 36	CLT; 17	DOV; 23	MYB; 23	GLN; 34	MLW; 31	TAL; 38	SBO; 25	IRP	MCH	BRI; 33	DAR; 28	RCH; 18	DOV	CLT; 23	CAR; 33	HOM; DNQ							24th	2026	
1995	Bown Racing	5	Chevy									NHA; 35																								24th	2026	
1996	Bown Racing	51	Chevy	DAY; 29	CAR; 29	RCH; 28	ATL; DNQ	NSV; 16	DAR; 35	BRI	HCY		CLT; 41	DOV	SBO	MYB; 34	GLN; 24	MLW; 13	NHA; 34	TAL; 30	IRP	MCH	BRI; 26	DAR; 21	RCH; 26	DOV; 26	CLT; 28	CAR	HOM							33rd	1346	
1996	Bown Racing	5	Chevy									NZH; 35																								33rd	1346	
1997	Bown Racing	51	Chevy	DAY; 36	CAR	RCH	ATL	LVS	DAR	HCY	TEX	BRI	NSV	TAL	NHA	NZH	CLT	DOV	SBO	GLN	MLW	MYB	GTY	IRP	MCH	BRI	DAR; 34	RCH	DOV	CLT; 40	CAL	CAR	HOM			81st	159	
1998	Bown Racing	51	Chevy	DAY	CAR; 41	LVS	NSV	DAR; 42	BRI	TEX	HCY	TAL	NHA	NZH	CLT; 37	DOV	RCH	PPR	GLN	MLW							DAR; 34	RCH	DOV	CLT; DNQ	GTY	CAR	ATL	HOM		65th	286	
1998	Mark III Racing	78	Chevy																		MYB; 24	CAL	SBO; DNQ	IRP	MCH	BRI										65th	286	
1999	Bown Racing	51	Chevy	DAY; DNQ	CAR	LVS	ATL	DAR; DNQ	TEX	NSV	BRI	TAL	CAL	NHA	RCH	NZH												DAR; 19	RCH	DOV	CLT; 41	CAR	MEM	PHO	HOM	93rd	151	
1999	Sasser Motorsports	65	Chevy														CLT; DNQ	DOV	SBO	GLN	MLW	MYB	PPR	GTY	IRP	MCH	BRI									93rd	151	
2000	Bown Racing	51	Chevy	DAY	CAR	LVS	ATL	DAR	BRI	TEX	NSV	TAL	CAL	RCH	NHA	CLT; DNQ	DOV	SBO	MYB	GLN	MLW	NZH	PPR	GTY	IRP	MCH	BRI	DAR	RCH	DOV	CLT; 40	CAR	MEM	PHO	HOM	112th	43	

==== Craftsman Truck Series ====
NASCAR Craftsman Truck Series results
Year	Team	No.	Make	1	2	3	4	5	6	7	8	9	10	11	12	13	14	15	16	17	18	19	20	21	22	23	24	25	26	NCTC	Pts	Ref
1997	Gloy Racing	55	Ford	WDW	TUS	HOM; DNQ	PHO; DNQ																							70th	259	
1997	Marquardt Racing	87	Chevy					POR; 16	EVG; DNQ	I70	NHA	TEX	BRI	NZH	MLW	LVL	CNS	HPT	IRP	FLM	NSV	GLN	RCH	MAR	SON	MMR	CAL	PHO	LVS	70th	259	
