= Gary Kershaw =

Canadian racing driver (born 1937)

- Born: 1937 (age 88–89); Victoria, British Columbia, Canada

NASCAR Cup Series career
- 1 race run over 1 year
- Best finish: 73rd (1981)
- First race: 1981 Winston Western 500 (Riverside)
| Wins | Top tens | Poles |
|---|---|---|
| 0 | 0 | 0 |

ARCA Menards Series West career
- 6 races run over 2 years
- Best finish: 19th (1982)
- First race: 1981 Winston Western 500 (Riverside)
- Last race: 1982 Victoria Winston 150 (Victoria)
| Wins | Top tens | Poles |
|---|---|---|
| 0 | 4 | 0 |
- Statistics up to date as of March 2, 2026.

Gary Kershaw (born 1937) is a former NASCAR driver from Victoria, British Columbia, Canada.

== Career ==
=== 1968 ===
Kershaw was the 1968 stock car champion at Western Speedway in Victoria. He moved up to the Super Stock division in 1969, and won the 1969 track championship.

=== 1981 ===
Kershaw made his NASCAR debut at Riverside International Raceway competing in a NASCAR Winston West Series combined event with the NASCAR Winston Cup Series, and was the highest finishing West driver in the race, credited with a 12th-place finish in both series and scoring points equivalent to a win in the West Series. He also competed in the following West Series event at Phoenix and finished 17th.

=== 1982 ===
Kershaw returned to the Winston West Series in 1982 and competed in four races, finishing in the top ten in all of them with a best finish of seventh twice.

== See also ==
- List of Canadians in NASCAR
