= 1982 World 600 =

Race details
- Race 12 of 30 in the 1982 NASCAR Winston Cup Series
- Date: May 30, 1982
- Location: Charlotte Motor Speedway, Concord, North Carolina
- Course: Permanent racing facility
- Course length: 1.5 miles (2.4 km)
- Distance: 400 laps, 600 mi (965.606 km)
- Weather: Temperatures averaging around 81.7 °F (27.6 °C); wind speeds up to 13.8 miles per hour (22.2 km/h)
- Average speed: 129.326 mph (208.130 km/h)

Pole position
Driver	David Pearson	Bobby Hawkins Racing

Most laps led
Driver	Dale Earnhardt	Bud Moore Engineering
- Laps: 122

Winner
No. 21	Neil Bonnett	Wood Brothers Racing

Television in the United States
- Network: Mizlou
- Announcers: Dave Despain & Dick Brooks

The 1982 World 600, the 23rd running of the event, was a NASCAR Winston Cup Series race held on May 30, 1982 at Charlotte Motor Speedway in Charlotte, North Carolina. Contested over 400 laps on the 1.5 mile (2.4 km) speedway, it was the 12th race of the 1982 NASCAR Winston Cup Series season. Neil Bonnett of Wood Brothers Racing won the race.

Tim Richmond, who crashed on lap 44, was driving a car with a mock sponsorship from "Clyde Torkle's Chicken Pit Special" to tie in with the movie Stroker Ace. Due to the crash, not much footage for the movie was shot.

== Background ==
Charlotte Motor Speedway is a motorsports complex located in Concord, North Carolina, United States 13 miles from Charlotte, North Carolina. The complex features a 1.5 miles (2.4 km) quad oval track that hosts NASCAR racing including the prestigious World 600 on Memorial Day weekend and the National 500. The speedway was built in 1959 by Bruton Smith and is considered the home track for NASCAR with many race teams located in the Charlotte area. The track is owned and operated by Speedway Motorsports Inc. (SMI).

== Top ten results ==
Pos	No.	Driver	Team	Manufacturer	Laps led
1	21	Neil Bonnett	Wood Brothers Racing	Ford	67
2	9	Bill Elliott	Melling Racing	Ford	75
3	88	Bobby Allison	DiGard Motorsports	Buick	99
4	27	Cale Yarborough	M.C. Anderson Racing	Buick	0
5	1	Buddy Baker	Ellington Racing	Buick	3
6	90	Jody Ridley	Donlavey Racing	Ford	1
7	3	Ricky Rudd	Richard Childress Racing	Pontiac	0
8	43	Richard Petty	Petty Enterprises	Pontiac	1
9	71	Dave Marcis	Marcis Auto Racing	Buick	1
10	47	Ron Bouchard	Race Hill Farm Team	Buick	0

== Race statistics ==
- Time of race: 4:36:48
- Average Speed: 130.058 miles per hour (209.308 km/h)
- Pole Speed: 162.511 miles per hour (261.536 km/h)
- Cautions: 10 for 62 laps
- Margin of Victory: 2 cl
- Lead changes: 47
