= Jim Reich =

American racing driver (born 1942)

- Born: November 5, 1942 (age 84); Turlock, California, U.S.
- Awards: 1982 NASCAR Winston West Series Rookie of the Year

NASCAR Cup Series career
- 2 races run over 1 year
- Best finish: 57th (1982)
- First race: 1982 Budweiser 400 (Riverside)
- Last race: 1982 Winston Western 500 (Riverside)
Wins	Top tens	Poles
0	1	0

ARCA Menards Series West career
- 16 races run over 2 years
- Best finish: 2nd (1982)
- First race: 1977 Winston Monterey 100 (Laguna Seca)
- Last race: 1982 Coors 250 (Phoenix)
- First win: 1977 Winston Mesa Marin 100 (Mesa Marin)
- Last win: 1982 Victoria Winston 150 (Victoria)
Wins	Top tens	Poles
2	11	1
- Statistics up to date as of March 4, 2026.

Jim Reich (born November 5, 1942) is an American former professional stock car racing driver. He competed in the NASCAR Winston Cup Series, NASCAR Winston West Series, and NASCAR Featherlite Southwest Tour.

== Racing career ==
Reich competed in the Rose Classic at All American Speedway three times between 1975 and 1979, with a best finish of fourth. He made a start in the NASCAR Late Model Sportsman National Championship in 1977 at Riverside International Raceway, finishing twentieth. He made his NASCAR Winston West Series debut that same year at Laguna Seca Raceway, where he was scored twenty-fifth after he failed to finish due to transmission issues. He made his next start at San Jose Speedway, finishing third, and in the following race at Mesa Marin Raceway, he started on pole and led every lap en route to his first series win. He would not compete in the series again in 1977, but returned to compete full-time in 1982, driving a Chevrolet for fellow stock car driver Ivan Baldwin. Across the season's thirteen races, he scored a win at Western Speedway, six top-fives, and nine top-tens, finishing second in the final standings. He was awarded rookie of the year. In contesting the full West schedule, he made two NASCAR Winston Cup Series starts at Riverside that were in combination with the West Series. In his Cup debut, he finished tenth, and in the second race, he finished nineteenth. Despite a successful season, Reich never returned to West Series competition. In 1989, he debuted in the NASCAR Featherlite Southwest Tour, failing to finish both starts he made. He made three more starts in 1990, once again failing to finish any races.

== Motorsports career results ==
=== NASCAR ===
(key) (Bold – Pole position awarded by qualifying time. Italics – Pole position earned by points standings or practice time. * – Most laps led.)

==== Winston Cup Series ====
NASCAR Winston Cup Series results
Year	Team	No.	Make	1	2	3	4	5	6	7	8	9	10	11	12	13	14	15	16	17	18	19	20	21	22	23	24	25	26	27	28	29	30	NWCC	Pts	Ref
1982	Baldwin Engineering	25	Chevy	DAY	RCH	BRI	ATL	CAR	DAR	NWS	MAR	TAL	NSV	DOV	CLT	POC	RSD; 10	MCH	DAY	NSV	POC	TAL	MCH	BRI	DAR	RCH	DOV	NWS	CLT	MAR	CAR	ATL	RSD; 19	57th	240	

==== Winston West Series ====
NASCAR Winston West Series results
Year	Team	No.	Make	1	2	3	4	5	6	7	8	9	10	11	12	13	14	15	16	17	18	19	20	NWWC	Pts	Ref
1977	Arlie Cook	12	Chevy	RSD	LAG; 25	ONT	SJS; 3	**MMR**; 1*	ASP	RSD	SGS	YAK	EVG	WSP	USP	POR	AAS	CRS	ASP	SHA	POR	ONT	PHO	35th	198.25	
1982	Baldwin Engineering	25	Chevy	MMR; 13	S99; 6	AAS; 5	RSD; 10	POR; 3	WSP; 1*	SHA; 2	EVG; 8	SON; 2	CDR; 2	RSD; 14	RSD; 19	PHO; 20								2nd	592	
