= Glenn Francis =

American racing driver (born 1942)

- Born: May 22, 1942 (age 84); Bakersfield, California, U.S.

NASCAR Cup Series career
- 16 races run over 12 years
- Best finish: 59th (1983)
- First race: 1970 Falstaff 400 (Riverside)
- Last race: 1985 Budweiser 400 (Riverside)
Wins	Top tens	Poles
0	0	0

ARCA Menards Series West career
- 72 races run over 15 years
- Best finish: 7th (1976)
- First race: 1969 Sacramento 100 (Sacramento)
- Last race: 1985 Budweiser 400 (Riverside)
Wins	Top tens	Poles
0	12	0
- Statistics up to date as of October 27, 2026.

Glenn Francis (born May 22, 1942) is an American former professional stock car racing driver. He competed in the NASCAR Winston Cup Series and NASCAR Winston West Series between 1969 and 1985.

== Racing career ==
Francis began competing in the NASCAR Pacific Coast Late Model Division in 1969, running four races with a best finish of sixth at Santa Maria Speedway.

Francis ran seven races in the renamed Grand National West in 1970, failing to record a top-ten finish, with his best result being eleventh at Ascot Park. These starts included his NASCAR Grand National Series debut in a combination race at Riverside International Raceway, where he finished twentieth.

In 1971, Francis ran nine races in the renamed Winston West Series, scoring two top-tens, including his first career top-five with a fifth-place finish at Orange Show Speedway. He competed in the first Riverside combination race, finishing 34th due to engine issues, and failed to qualify for the combination race at Ontario Motor Speedway.

Francis attempted eight Winston West races in 1972, failing to qualify three times and making the field five times, scoring a best finish of seventeenth in his first start of the season at Stockton 99 Speedway. One of his attempts came in a combination race at Ontario, where he failed to qualify.

Francis made only one Winston West start in 1973, finishing seventeenth of eighteen cars at Bakersfield Speedway due to transmission issues. He competed in the Winston Cup races at Riverside, finishing 31st in the season opener due to an oil system issue and eighteenth in the second Riverside race. He also finished 38th in a NASCAR Late Model Sportsman National Championship race at Riverside.

In eight Winston West starts in 1974, Francis again failed to finish in the top ten, scoring a best finish of thirteenth at Riverside and Altamont Speedway. In two combination race starts, Francis finished thirteenth in the aforementioned Riverside race and 22nd at Ontario due to an oil leak. He also ran two NASCAR Late Model Sportsman races at Riverside, finishing 41st and 31st.

Francis ran seven Winston West races in 1975, scoring two top-tens, both eighth-place finishes, which came at Craig Road Speedway and Manzanita Speedway. In the combination races at Riverside, he finished 25th in the season opener due to rear end issues and eleventh in the second Riverside race. He finished 31st in a NASCAR Late Model Sportsman race at Riverside.

After skipping the first two races of the 1976 Winston West season, which were both Winston Cup combination races at Riverside, Francis competed in the remaining eleven events, scoring four top-tens with a best finish of sixth at Shasta Speedway. He finished a career-best seventh in the standings. He finished 28th in the combination race at Ontario due to engine issues. Francis finished 28th in his final known Late Model Sportsman start at Riverside. He also made his lone 24 Hours of Daytona appearance, also his only IMSA Camel GT Championship start, driving a Chevrolet Chevelle in the G. I. class, where he finished 33rd overall and ninth in class with co-driver Randy Bebout, his NASCAR crew chief.

Francis made four Winston West starts in 1977, scoring a best finish of nineteenth in the lone race he was running at the finish in at Laguna Seca Raceway. He finished 33rd in a combination race at Riverside and failed to qualify for the combination race at Ontario. He also made his lone USAC Stock Car Series start at Ontario, finishing sixteenth.

Francis only attempted one NASCAR race in 1978, failing to qualify for the Winston Cup and Winston West season opener at Riverside.

Francis returned to NASCAR in 1980, where he ran six Winston West races, scoring two top-tens with a best finish of sixth at Laguna Seca. He finished 32nd in the combination race at Ontario due to engine issues. He also made his only recorded NASCAR Grand American Stock Car National Championship start, finishing 38th at Riverside.

Francis made two Winston West starts in 1981, finishing 24th at Mesa Marin Raceway due to engine issues and finishing twelfth at Riverside.

Francis competed in four Winston West races in 1982, scoring a best finish of fourteenth at Riverside. This finish came in his lone combination race start of the year.

Francis made three Winston West starts in 1983, all at Riverside, where he scored a best finish of fourteenth in June. This race as well as the race in November were combination races with the Winston Cup Series; Francis finished 28th due to shifter issues in November.

Francis attempted two Riverside combination races in 1984, finishing sixteenth in the first race and failing to qualify for the second race at the track.

Francis simultaneously made his final Winston Cup and Winston West start in 1985, finishing twentieth at Riverside.
