= 1989 Autoworks 500 =

28th race of the 1989 NASCAR Winston Cup Series

Race details
- Race 28 of 29 in the 1989 NASCAR Winston Cup Series
- The 1989 Autoworks 500 program cover.
- Date: November 5, 1989
- Official name: 2nd Annual Autoworks 500
- Location: Avondale, Arizona, Phoenix International Raceway
- Course: Permanent racing facility
- Course length: 1 miles (1.6 km)
- Distance: 312 laps, 312 mi (502.115 km)
- Average speed: 105.683 miles per hour (170.080 km/h)
- Attendance: 65,000

Pole position
Driver	Ken Schrader	Hendrick Motorsports
- Time: 28.882

Most laps led
Driver	Alan Kulwicki	AK Racing
- Laps: 96

Winner
No. 9	Bill Elliott	Melling Racing

Television in the United States
- Network: ESPN
- Announcers: Bob Jenkins, Benny Parsons, Ned Jarrett

Radio in the United States
- Radio: Motor Racing Network

The 1989 Autoworks 500 was the 28th and penultimate stock car race of the 1989 NASCAR Winston Cup Series season, the 11th and final race of the 1989 NASCAR Winston West Series season, and the second iteration of the event. The race was held on Sunday, November 5, 1989, before an audience of 65,000 in Avondale, Arizona at Phoenix International Raceway, a 1-mile (1.6 km) permanent low-banked tri-oval race track. The race took the scheduled 312 laps to complete. Assisted by a late-race crash from the championship leader at the time, Rusty Wallace, Melling Racing driver Bill Elliott would manage to take over control for the final 48 laps of the race to take his 32nd career NASCAR Winston Cup Series victory and his third and final victory of the season. To fill out the top three, Junior Johnson & Associates driver Terry Labonte and Roush Racing driver Mark Martin would finish second and third, respectively.

In the NASCAR Winston West Series championship race, Bill Schmitt was able to defeat competitor Bill Sedgwick by 56 points to take his third career Winston West Series championship.

Headed into the final race of the Winston Cup Series season, the 1989 Atlanta Journal 500, three drivers were mathematically eligible to clinch the championship, with Rusty Wallace leading the standings with 4,058 points, Mark Martin in second with 3,980 points, and Dale Earnhardt in third with 3,979 points. Wallace, who came into the race leading then second-place Earnhardt by 109 points, had a poor finish due to a crash caused by Stan Barrett, decreasing his lead by 31 points. In order for Wallace to clinch the championship, Wallace would need an 18th place finish or better to earn his first Winston Cup Series title.

== Background ==
The layout of Phoenix International Raceway, the venue where the race was held.

Phoenix International Raceway – also known as PIR – is a one-mile, low-banked tri-oval race track located in Avondale, Arizona. It is named after the nearby metropolitan area of Phoenix. The motorsport track opened in 1964 and currently hosts two NASCAR race weekends annually. PIR has also hosted the IndyCar Series, CART, USAC and the Rolex Sports Car Series. The raceway is currently owned and operated by International Speedway Corporation.

The raceway was originally constructed with a 2.5 mi (4.0 km) road course that ran both inside and outside of the main tri-oval. In 1991 the track was reconfigured with the current 1.51 mi (2.43 km) interior layout. PIR has an estimated grandstand seating capacity of around 67,000. Lights were installed around the track in 2004 following the addition of a second annual NASCAR race weekend.

=== Entry list ===
- (R) denotes rookie driver.

#	Driver	Team	Make	Sponsor
1	Butch Miller (R)	Miller Racing	Chevrolet	Dinner Bell Foods
2	Ernie Irvan	U.S. Racing	Pontiac	Kroger
3	Dale Earnhardt	Richard Childress Racing	Chevrolet	GM Goodwrench Service Plus
4	Rick Wilson	Morgan–McClure Motorsports	Oldsmobile	Kodak
04	Hershel McGriff	McGriff Motorsports	Pontiac	U. S. Bank
5	Geoff Bodine	Hendrick Motorsports	Chevrolet	Levi Garrett
6	Mark Martin	Roush Racing	Ford	Stroh's Light
7	Alan Kulwicki	AK Racing	Ford	Zerex
8	Bobby Hillin Jr.	Stavola Brothers Racing	Buick	Miller High Life
08	Rick McCray	McCray Racing	Pontiac	Warner W. Hodgdon
9	Bill Elliott	Melling Racing	Ford	Coors Light
09	Roy Smith	Midgley Racing	Pontiac	Midgley Racing
10	Derrike Cope	Whitcomb Racing	Pontiac	Purolator
11	Terry Labonte	Junior Johnson & Associates	Ford	Budweiser
15	Brett Bodine	Bud Moore Engineering	Ford	Motorcraft
16	Larry Pearson (R)	Pearson Racing	Buick	Chattanooga Chew
17	Darrell Waltrip	Hendrick Motorsports	Chevrolet	Tide
18	Tommy Ellis	Hendrick Motorsports	Chevrolet	Hardee's
21	Neil Bonnett	Wood Brothers Racing	Ford	Citgo
22	St. James Davis	St. James Racing	Buick	St. James Racing
25	Ken Schrader	Hendrick Motorsports	Chevrolet	Folgers
26	Ricky Rudd	King Racing	Buick	Quaker State
27	Rusty Wallace	Blue Max Racing	Pontiac	Kodiak
28	Davey Allison	Robert Yates Racing	Ford	Texaco, Havoline
29	Dale Jarrett	Cale Yarborough Motorsports	Pontiac	Hardee's
30	Michael Waltrip	Bahari Racing	Pontiac	Country Time
33	Harry Gant	Jackson Bros. Motorsports	Oldsmobile	Skoal Bandit
38	Duke Hoenshell	Hoenshell Racing	Pontiac	Bautista Restoration
40	Joe Ruttman	Reno Enterprises	Chevrolet	Dinner Bell Foods
42	Kyle Petty	SABCO Racing	Pontiac	Peak Antifreeze
43	Richard Petty	Petty Enterprises	Pontiac	STP
44	Jim Sauter	Group 44	Pontiac	Group 44
46	Greg Sacks	Hendrick Motorsports	Chevrolet	City Chevrolet
51	Bobby Hamilton	Hendrick Motorsports	Chevrolet	Exxon
52	Jimmy Means	Jimmy Means Racing	Pontiac	Alka-Seltzer
55	Phil Parsons	Jackson Bros. Motorsports	Oldsmobile	Skoal, Crown Central Petroleum
57	Hut Stricklin (R)	Osterlund Racing	Pontiac	Heinz
62	Ron Esau	Douglas Smith Racing	Oldsmobile	Baja Boats
71	Dave Marcis	Marcis Auto Racing	Chevrolet	Lifebuoy
73	Bill Schmitt	Schmitt Racing	Chevrolet	Ross Stores
75	Morgan Shepherd	RahMoc Enterprises	Pontiac	Valvoline
76	Bill Sedgwick	Spears Motorsports	Buick	Spears Manufacturing
80	Bob Walker	Bob Walker Racing	Pontiac	Bayside Builders
83	Lake Speed	Speed Racing	Oldsmobile	Bull's-Eye Barbecue Sauce
84	Dick Trickle (R)	Stavola Brothers Racing	Buick	Miller High Life
88	Jimmy Spencer (R)	Baker–Schiff Racing	Pontiac	Crisco
89	Rodney Combs	Mueller Brothers Racing	Pontiac	Evinrude Outboard Motors
90	Stan Barrett	Donlavey Racing	Ford	V8
94	Sterling Marlin	Hagan Racing	Oldsmobile	Sunoco
99	John Krebs	Krebs Racing	Pontiac	Skoal Bandit

== Qualifying ==
Qualifying was split into two rounds. The first round was held on Friday, November 2, at 5:30 PM EST. Each driver would have one lap to set a time. During the first round, the top 20 drivers in the round would be guaranteed a starting spot in the race. If a driver was not able to guarantee a spot in the first round, they had the option to scrub their time from the first round and try and run a faster lap time in a second round qualifying run, held on Saturday, November 3, at 2:00 PM EST. As with the first round, each driver would have one lap to set a time. For this specific race, positions 21-40 would be decided on time, and depending on who needed it, a select amount of positions were given to cars who had not otherwise qualified but were high enough in owner's points; which was up to two for cars in the NASCAR Winston Cup Series and up to two extra provisionals for the cars in the NASCAR Winston West Series.

Ken Schrader, driving for Hendrick Motorsports, would win the pole, setting a time of 28.882 and an average speed of 124.645 miles per hour (200.597 km/h) in the first round.

Seven drivers would fail to qualify.

=== Full qualifying results ===
Pos.	#	Driver	Team	Make	Time	Speed
1	25	Ken Schrader	Hendrick Motorsports	Chevrolet	28.882	124.645
2	11	Terry Labonte	Junior Johnson & Associates	Ford	28.902	124.559
3	7	Alan Kulwicki	AK Racing	Ford	28.965	124.288
4	10	Derrike Cope	Whitcomb Racing	Pontiac	28.994	124.164
5	51	Bobby Hamilton	Hendrick Motorsports	Chevrolet	29.012	124.087
6	6	Mark Martin	Roush Racing	Ford	29.048	123.933
7	3	Dale Earnhardt	Richard Childress Racing	Chevrolet	29.053	123.911
8	5	Geoff Bodine	Hendrick Motorsports	Chevrolet	29.058	123.890
9	27	Rusty Wallace	Blue Max Racing	Pontiac	29.061	123.877
10	84	Dick Trickle (R)	Stavola Brothers Racing	Buick	29.061	123.877
11	26	Ricky Rudd	King Racing	Buick	29.097	123.724
12	16	Larry Pearson (R)	Pearson Racing	Buick	29.169	123.419
13	9	Bill Elliott	Melling Racing	Ford	29.171	123.410
14	28	Davey Allison	Robert Yates Racing	Ford	29.192	123.321
15	4	Rick Wilson	Morgan–McClure Motorsports	Oldsmobile	29.213	123.233
16	17	Darrell Waltrip	Hendrick Motorsports	Chevrolet	29.230	123.161
17	75	Morgan Shepherd	RahMoc Enterprises	Pontiac	29.260	123.035
18	33	Harry Gant	Jackson Bros. Motorsports	Oldsmobile	29.265	123.014
19	94	Sterling Marlin	Hagan Racing	Oldsmobile	29.284	122.934
20	1	Butch Miller (R)	Miller Racing	Chevrolet	29.312	122.817
Failed to lock in Round 1
21	2	Ernie Irvan	U.S. Racing	Pontiac	29.330	122.741
22	83	Lake Speed	Speed Racing	Oldsmobile	29.360	122.616
23	30	Michael Waltrip	Bahari Racing	Pontiac	29.361	122.612
24	21	Neil Bonnett	Wood Brothers Racing	Ford	29.381	122.528
25	15	Brett Bodine	Bud Moore Engineering	Ford	29.381	122.528
26	43	Richard Petty	Petty Enterprises	Pontiac	29.413	122.395
27	62	Ron Esau	Douglas Smith Racing	Oldsmobile	29.423	122.353
28	8	Bobby Hillin Jr.	Stavola Brothers Racing	Buick	29.427	122.337
29	42	Kyle Petty	SABCO Racing	Pontiac	29.428	122.332
30	46	Greg Sacks	Hendrick Motorsports	Chevrolet	29.434	122.308
31	29	Dale Jarrett	Cale Yarborough Motorsports	Pontiac	29.468	122.166
32	57	Hut Stricklin (R)	Osterlund Racing	Pontiac	29.475	122.137
33	71	Dave Marcis	Marcis Auto Racing	Chevrolet	29.564	121.770
34	88	Jimmy Spencer (R)	Baker–Schiff Racing	Pontiac	29.628	121.507
35	44	Jim Sauter	Group 44	Pontiac	29.629	121.503
36	55	Phil Parsons	Jackson Bros. Motorsports	Oldsmobile	29.651	121.412
37	09	Roy Smith	Midgley Racing	Pontiac	29.669	121.339
38	76	Bill Sedgwick	Spears Motorsports	Buick	29.670	121.335
39	40	Joe Ruttman	Reno Enterprises	Chevrolet	29.671	121.331
40	89	Rodney Combs	Mueller Brothers Racing	Pontiac	29.697	121.224
Winston Cup provisionals
41	52	Jimmy Means	Jimmy Means Racing	Pontiac	29.726	121.106
42	90	Stan Barrett	Donlavey Racing	Ford	30.077	119.693
Winston West provisional
43	73	Bill Schmitt	Schmitt Racing	Chevrolet	29.989	120.044
Failed to qualify
44	18	Tommy Ellis	Hendrick Motorsports	Chevrolet	-*	-*
45	04	Hershel McGriff	McGriff Motorsports	Pontiac	-*	-*
46	38	Duke Hoenshell	Hoenshell Racing	Pontiac	-*	-*
47	99	John Krebs	Krebs Racing	Pontiac	-*	-*
48	08	Rick McCray	McCray Racing	Pontiac	-*	-*
49	80	Bob Walker	Bob Walker Racing	Pontiac	-*	-*
50	22	St. James Davis	St. James Racing	Buick	-*	-*
Official first round qualifying results
Official starting lineup

== Race results ==
Fin	St	#	Driver	Team	Make	Laps	Led	Status	Pts	Winnings
1	13	9	Bill Elliott	Melling Racing	Ford	312	50	running	180	$57,900
2	2	11	Terry Labonte	Junior Johnson & Associates	Ford	312	0	running	170	$34,275
3	6	6	Mark Martin	Roush Racing	Ford	312	5	running	170	$23,725
4	16	17	Darrell Waltrip	Hendrick Motorsports	Chevrolet	312	11	running	165	$20,290
5	31	29	Dale Jarrett	Cale Yarborough Motorsports	Pontiac	312	0	running	155	$22,112
6	7	3	Dale Earnhardt	Richard Childress Racing	Chevrolet	312	0	running	150	$16,995
7	10	84	Dick Trickle (R)	Stavola Brothers Racing	Buick	312	0	running	146	$12,460
8	18	33	Harry Gant	Jackson Bros. Motorsports	Oldsmobile	312	0	running	142	$14,000
9	23	30	Michael Waltrip	Bahari Racing	Pontiac	312	0	running	138	$10,590
10	34	88	Jimmy Spencer (R)	Baker–Schiff Racing	Pontiac	312	0	running	134	$12,755
11	3	7	Alan Kulwicki	AK Racing	Ford	312	96	running	140	$20,770
12	17	75	Morgan Shepherd	RahMoc Enterprises	Pontiac	312	0	running	127	$13,160
13	1	25	Ken Schrader	Hendrick Motorsports	Chevrolet	312	7	running	129	$14,450
14	4	10	Derrike Cope	Whitcomb Racing	Pontiac	311	0	running	121	$6,440
15	33	71	Dave Marcis	Marcis Auto Racing	Chevrolet	311	0	running	118	$8,105
16	9	27	Rusty Wallace	Blue Max Racing	Pontiac	311	76	running	120	$14,745
17	35	44	Jim Sauter	Group 44	Pontiac	311	0	running	112	$4,960
18	28	8	Bobby Hillin Jr.	Stavola Brothers Racing	Buick	310	0	running	109	$6,725
19	25	15	Brett Bodine	Bud Moore Engineering	Ford	310	0	running	106	$6,590
20	39	40	Joe Ruttman	Reno Enterprises	Chevrolet	309	0	running	103	$4,430
21	29	42	Kyle Petty	SABCO Racing	Pontiac	309	0	running	100	$3,470
22	22	83	Lake Speed	Speed Racing	Oldsmobile	309	0	running	97	$6,385
23	32	57	Hut Stricklin (R)	Osterlund Racing	Pontiac	309	0	running	94	$4,250
24	12	16	Larry Pearson (R)	Pearson Racing	Buick	308	0	running	91	$4,085
25	41	52	Jimmy Means	Jimmy Means Racing	Pontiac	307	0	running	88	$3,425
26	43	73	Bill Schmitt	Schmitt Racing	Chevrolet	307	0	running	85	$3,995
27	40	89	Rodney Combs	Mueller Brothers Racing	Pontiac	305	0	running	82	$3,250
28	8	5	Geoff Bodine	Hendrick Motorsports	Chevrolet	280	61	valve	84	$10,915
29	11	26	Ricky Rudd	King Racing	Buick	272	1	radiator	81	$10,930
30	19	94	Sterling Marlin	Hagan Racing	Oldsmobile	249	0	fire	73	$5,830
31	42	90	Stan Barrett	Donlavey Racing	Ford	242	0	brakes	70	$3,105
32	5	51	Bobby Hamilton	Hendrick Motorsports	Chevrolet	215	5	engine	72	$3,075
33	21	2	Ernie Irvan	U.S. Racing	Pontiac	206	0	engine	64	$3,660
34	24	21	Neil Bonnett	Wood Brothers Racing	Ford	201	0	clutch	61	$5,615
35	27	62	Ron Esau	Douglas Smith Racing	Oldsmobile	194	0	brakes	58	$2,960
36	38	76	Bill Sedgwick	Spears Motorsports	Buick	170	0	ignition	55	$3,525
37	36	55	Phil Parsons	Jackson Bros. Motorsports	Oldsmobile	164	0	crash	52	$4,915
38	30	46	Greg Sacks	Hendrick Motorsports	Chevrolet	160	0	handling	49	$2,895
39	14	28	Davey Allison	Robert Yates Racing	Ford	153	0	engine	46	$11,270
40	15	4	Rick Wilson	Morgan–McClure Motorsports	Oldsmobile	57	0	camshaft	43	$4,845
41	37	09	Roy Smith	Midgley Racing	Pontiac	40	0	engine	40	$4,445
42	26	43	Richard Petty	Petty Enterprises	Pontiac	34	0	engine	37	$2,840
43	20	1	Butch Miller (R)	Miller Racing	Chevrolet	16	0	engine	34	$2,825
Failed to qualify
44		18	Tommy Ellis	Hendrick Motorsports	Chevrolet					
45		04	Hershel McGriff	McGriff Motorsports	Pontiac					
46		38	Duke Hoenshell	Hoenshell Racing	Pontiac					
47		99	John Krebs	Krebs Racing	Pontiac					
48		08	Rick McCray	McCray Racing	Pontiac					
49		80	Bob Walker	Bob Walker Racing	Pontiac					
50		22	St. James Davis	St. James Racing	Buick					
Official race results

== Standings after the race ==
Drivers' Championship standings

	Pos	Driver	Points
	1	Rusty Wallace	4,058
1	2	Mark Martin	3,980 (-78)
1	3	Dale Earnhardt	3,979 (-79)
	4	Darrell Waltrip	3,811 (–247)
	5	Bill Elliott	3,692 (–366)
	6	Ken Schrader	3,621 (–437)
2	7	Terry Labonte	3,521 (–537)
	8	Harry Gant	3,498 (–560)
2	9	Ricky Rudd	3,482 (–576)
	10	Geoff Bodine	3,430 (–628)
Official driver's standings

- Note: Only the first 10 positions are included for the driver standings.

Previous race: 1989 AC Delco 500	NASCAR Winston Cup Series; 1989 season	Next race: 1989 Atlanta Journal 500

Previous race: 1989 Winston 200	NASCAR Winston West Series; 1989 season	Next race: 1990 Spears Manufacturing 400
