= 1981 Winston Western 500 (November) =

Auto race held at Riverside International Raceway in 1981

Race details
- Race 31 of 31 in the 1981 NASCAR Winston Cup Series season
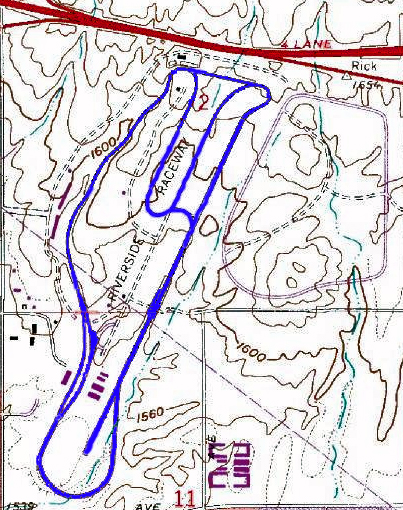
- Layout of Riverside International Raceway (1969-1988 version)
- Date: November 22, 1981
- Official name: Winston Western 500
- Location: Riverside International Raceway (Riverside, California)
- Course: Permanent racing facility
- Course length: 2.700 miles (4.345 km)
- Distance: 119 laps, 311.8 mi (501.7 km)
- Weather: Temperatures of 72 °F (22 °C); wind speeds of 7 miles per hour (11 km/h)
- Average speed: 95.288 miles per hour (153.351 km/h)
- Attendance: 46,000

Pole position
Driver	Darrell Waltrip	Junior Johnson & Associates

Most laps led
Driver	Bobby Allison	Ranier Racing
- Laps: 49

Winner
No. 28	Bobby Allison	Ranier Racing

Television in the United States
- Network: Untelevised
- Announcers: None

The 1981 Winston Western 500 was a NASCAR Winston Cup Series race that was held on November 22, 1981, at Riverside International Raceway in Riverside, California. NASCAR ran three Cup Series races at Riverside in 1981.

Richard Childress decided to run a second Junior Johnson car if Darrell Waltrip were to have trouble or if he needed a car to win the championship. However, this was not needed because Darrell Waltrip would clinch his first Winston Cup series championship at this race over Bobby Allison. He would become the first champion not from the Carolinas since Virginia's Joe Weatherly in 1963.

Dave Marcis finished the 1981 NASCAR Winston Cup Series season at Riverside in a Pontiac, after racing in a Chevrolet, Buick, Oldsmobile, Dodge, and Chrysler throughout the year.

== Race report ==
This race at Riverside during the 1981 NASCAR Winston Cup Series season was used to make up for the loss of the season-ending race at Ontario Motor Speedway. In previous years Riverside had the opening date in January and a race in June. Then they changed it leaving the June Riverside race and putting the second race as the finale from 1982 to 1986 before Atlanta got the finale until 2000. Riverside kept its two races until its last race in June 1988 and the dates went to Sonoma and Phoenix. Then they added a second Pocono race in 1982 but then lost Texas World Speedway. It would be the last time a circuit would have three Cup Series races in a single season until Darlington Raceway earned three dates in the 2020 season due to the COVID-19 pandemic.

It took three hours and sixteen seconds for Bobby Allison to defeat Joe Ruttman by 0.24 seconds in front of 46000 spectators driving Harry Ranier’s No. 28 Hardee's Buick. There was a battle between Allison and Ruttman for the last 20 laps. Bobby passed Joe with nine laps to go and Ruttman got back alongside Allison several times but was never able to complete the pass. Ruttman got his first of three 2nd-place finishes. Bobby Allison would get his sixth and final NASCAR road course win. All of his victories on the twisty circuits came here at Riverside during a 10-year period from 1971 to 1981. He had 25 top-10s here in 43 starts overall.

Richard Childress would make his final racing appearance here before devoting his career to running Richard Childress Racing. Former Formula One racer Bob Bondurant would retire from the NASCAR Cup Series after this race with his best career finish of 18th place. Seven cautions slowed the race for 33 laps on this road course that spanned 2.620 miles (4.216 km) per lap; for a grand total of 311.8 miles (501.8 km). Darrell Waltrip qualified for the pole position with a speed of 114.981 miles per hour (185.044 km/h) while the average race speed was 95.288 miles per hour (153.351 km/h). This would be the first time in 14 races that Waltrip failed to finish in the top three. Out of the entire 40-driver grid, 38 drivers were American while Roy Smith and Gary Kershaw were Canadians.

Ricky Rudd would finish last with an engine problem on the second lap in his Buick; earning $6,150 in prize winnings ($21,779.37 when inflation is taken into effect). J.D. McDuffie would finish in 11th place; a rarity for a driver with the most last-place finishes in NASCAR history. Joe Millikan would make his final "top five" finish in this race.

Notable crew chiefs for the race included Junie Donlavey, Joey Arrington, Elmo Langley, Jake Elder, Travis Carter, Waddell Wilson, Bud Moore, Tim Brewer, Kirk Shelmerdine, and Dale Inman.

=== Qualifying ===
Grid	No.	Driver	Manufacturer
1	11	Darrell Waltrip	Buick
2	44	Terry Labonte	Buick
3	3	Dale Earnhardt	Pontiac
4	33	Harry Gant	Pontiac
5	28	Bobby Allison	Buick
6	37	Tim Richmond	Buick
7	15	Benny Parsons	Ford
8	24	Morgan Shepherd	Buick
9	5	Joe Millikan	Pontiac
10	21	Neil Bonnett	Ford

Failed to qualify: Ferrel Harris (#64), Don Stanley (#61)

== Finishing order ==
Section reference:

1. Bobby Allison (No. 28)
2. Joe Ruttman (No. 2)
3. Terry Labonte (No. 44)
4. Dale Earnhardt (No. 3)
5. Joe Millikan (No. 5)
6. Darrell Waltrip (No. 11)
7. Richard Petty (No. 43)
8. Harry Gant (No. 33)
9. Jody Ridley (No. 90)
10. Ron Bouchard (No. 47)
11. J.D. McDuffie (No. 70)
12. Gary Kershaw (No. 74)
13. Morgan Shepherd (No. 24)
14. Bill Schmitt (No. 73)
15. Don Waterman (No. 38)
16. Lake Speed (No. 17)
17. James Hylton (No. 48)
18. Bob Bondurant (No. 69)
19. Gary Balough (No. 75)
20. Tim Richmond (No. 37)
21. Don Puskarich (No. 13)
22. Gene Thonesen (No. 7)
23. Mark Stahl (No. 85)
24. Buddy Arrington (No. 67)
25. Dave Marcis* (No. 71)
26. Tommy Gale* (No. 64)
27. Benny Parsons* (No. 15)
28. Chuck Pettinger* (No. 1)
29. Scott Miller* (No. 51)
30. Roy Smith* (No. 0)
31. Terry Herman* (No. 99)
32. Jim Robinson* (No. 78)
33. Neil Bonnett* (No. 21)
34. Pat Mintey* (No. 35)
35. Don Whittington* (No. 93)
36. Jim Bown* (No. 16)
37. Kyle Petty* (No. 42)
38. Hershel McGriff* (No. 1)
39. Richard Childress* (No. 41)
40. Ricky Rudd* (No. 88)

* Driver failed to finish race

== Standings after the race ==
Pos	Driver	Points	Differential
1	Darrell Waltrip	4880	0
2	Bobby Allison	4827	-53
3	Harry Gant	4218	-662
4 ▲	Terry Labonte	4052	-828
5 ▲	Jody Ridley	4002	-878
6 ▼	Ricky Rudd	3991	-889
7	Dale Earnhardt	3978	-902
8	Richard Petty	3883	-997
9	Dave Marcis	3510	-1370
10	Benny Parsons	3452	-1428

Preceded by 1981 Atlanta Journal 500	NASCAR Winston Cup Series Season; 1981-82	Succeeded by 1982 Daytona 500

Preceded by January 1981	Winston Western 500 races 1981	Succeeded by 1982
