= 1982 Winston Western 500 =

Auto race held at Riverside International Raceway in 1982

Race details
- Race 30 of 30 in the 1982 NASCAR Winston Cup Series season
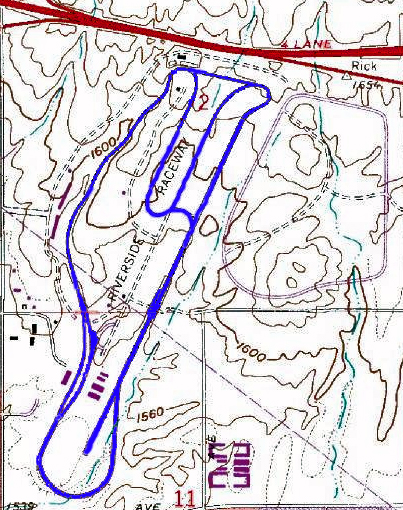
- Layout of Riverside International Raceway (1969-1988 version)
- Date: November 21, 1982
- Official name: Winston Western 500
- Location: Riverside International Raceway, Riverside, California
- Course: Permanent racing facility
- Course length: 2.700 miles (4.345 km)
- Distance: 119 laps, 311.8 mi (501.7 km)
- Weather: Temperatures of 59 °F (15 °C); wind speeds of 2.9 miles per hour (4.7 km/h)
- Average speed: 99.823 miles per hour (160.650 km/h)
- Attendance: 38,000

Pole position
Driver	Darrell Waltrip	Junior Johnson & Associates

Most laps led
Driver	Tim Richmond	Jim Stacy Racing
- Laps: 92

Winner
No. 2	Tim Richmond	Jim Stacy Racing

Television in the United States
- Network: Mizlou
- Announcers: Ken Squier; Buddy Baker

The 1982 Winston Western 500 was a NASCAR Winston Cup Series race held on November 21, 1982, at Riverside International Raceway in Riverside, California.

== Background ==
Riverside International Speedway was a race track or road course in Moreno Valley, California. The track was in operation from September 22, 1957, to July 2, 1989. The original course design proved to be dangerous, and it was partially reconfigured in 1969.

== Race report ==
Tim Richmond would defeat Ricky Rudd in the three hour long, 119 lap race which had 38 000 spectators in attendance. Seven seconds would end up separating the winner from the second-place finisher. Darrell Waltrip would qualify on pole position with a speed of 114.995 miles per hour (185.067 km/h) in qualifying. Dale Earnhardt, recorded a last-place finish on lap 8 due to an oil leak. There would be 42 drivers on the grid; two of them were Canadian while the other 40 were born in the United States. Only one Chevrolet vehicle would participate in the race; driven by Jim Reich and owned by Ivan Baldwin.

Clive Skipton was the only non-qualifier for this event. Trevor Boys and Derrike Cope would make their introduction into NASCAR during this race while Reich, Jim Lee, and Terry Herman would retire after this race.

During the race, Terry Labonte survived a horrible crash on lap 94. His car reportedly slammed the wall in turn 9, and he suffered a broken leg, an ankle, and several facial lacerations. Despite his injuries, Labonte recovered and won at the track two years later.

The total purse of the race would be $203,745 ($679,735 when adjusted for inflation), the winner of the race would receive $24,730 ($82,504 when adjusted for inflation) while 41st-place finisher Kevin Terris would receive $525 ($1,752 when adjusted for inflation). Terris made his first Cup start in more than a decade but went out early with a blown engine. He would only make one further Cup start.

=== Qualifying ===
Grid	No.	Driver	Manufacturer	Owner
1	11	Darrell Waltrip	Buick	Junior Johnson
2	88	Bobby Allison	Pontiac	DiGard
3	28	Joe Ruttman	Pontiac	Harry Ranier
4	2	Tim Richmond	Buick	Jim Stacy
5	3	Ricky Rudd	Pontiac	Richard Childress
6	50	Geoffrey Bodine	Pontiac	Cliff Stewart
7	15	Dale Earnhardt	Ford	Bud Moore
8	17	Lake Speed	Pontiac	Roger Hamby
9	33	Harry Gant	Buick	Hal Needham
10	75	Jimmy Insolo	Pontiac	RahMoc Enterprises

Failed to qualify: Clive Skilton (#61)

== Top 10 finishers ==
Pos	Grid	No.	Driver	Manufacturer	Laps	Winnings	Laps led	Points	Time/Status
1	4	2	Tim Richmond	Buick	119	$24,730	92	185	3:07:24
2	5	3	Ricky Rudd	Pontiac	119	$16,980	1	175	+7 seconds
3	1	11	Darrell Waltrip	Buick	119	$25,100	8	170	Lead lap under green flag
4	13	21	Neil Bonnett	Ford	119	$6,100	1	165	Lead lap under green flag
5	20	02	Mark Martin	Buick	118	$7,760	0	155	+1 lap
6	15	57	Ron Bouchard	Buick	117	$10,120	0	150	+2 laps
7	29	55	Benny Parsons	Buick	117	$2,850	0	146	+2 laps
8	16	98	Morgan Shepherd	Buick	116	$5,300	0	142	+3 laps
9	25	90	Jody Ridley	Ford	115	$9,850	0	138	+4 laps
10	23	16	Jim Bown	Buick	115	$2,550	0	134	+4 laps

== Timeline ==
Section reference:

- Start of race: Darrell Waltrip had the pole position as the green flag was waved.
- Lap 5: Bobby Allison took over the lead from Darrell Waltrip.
- Lap 8: A sudden oil leak from Dale Earnhardt's vehicle made him the last-place finisher of the event.
- Lap 9: Tim Richmond took over the lead from Bobby Allison.
- Lap 12: Kevin Terris' vehicle suddenly developed engine troubles.
- Lap 14: Ricky Rudd took over the lead from Tim Richmond.
- Lap 15: J.D. McDuffie took over the lead from Ricky Rudd.
- Lap 16: Don Waterman took over the lead from J.D. McDuffie.
- Lap 17: Bobby Allison took over the lead from Don Waterman.
- Lap 20: The transmission on Joe Ruttman's vehicle stopped working properly.
- Lap 21: Tim Richmond took over the lead from Bobby Allison.
- Lap 31: Randy Becker's vehicle suddenly developed engine troubles.
- Lap 40: John Krebs had a terminal crash.
- Lap 42: An oil leak came out of Derrike Cope's vehicle.
- Lap 46: Bobby Allison took over the lead from Tim Richmond.
- Lap 48: Tim Richmond took over the lead from Bobby Allison.
- Lap 62: Rick McCray's vehicle suddenly developed engine troubles.
- Lap 72: Darrell Waltrip took over the lead from Tim Richmond.
- Lap 76: Harry Gant took over the lead from Darrell Waltrip.
- Lap 81: Tim Richmond took over the lead from Harry Gant.
- Lap 92: The transmission on Hershel McGriff's vehicle stopped working properly.
- Lap 94: Terry Labonte had a terminal crash.
- Lap 95: An oil leak came out of Harry Gant's vehicle.
- Lap 97: Neil Bonnett took over the lead from Tim Richmond.
- Lap 98: Tim Richmond took over the lead from Neil Bonnett.
- Lap 111: Bobby Allison's vehicle suddenly developed engine troubles.
- Finish: Tim Richmond was officially declared the winner of the event.

== Standings after the race ==
Pos	Driver	Points	Differential
1	Darrell Waltrip	4489	0
2	Bobby Allison	4417	-72
3	Terry Labonte	4211	-278
4	Harry Gant	3877	-612
5	Richard Petty	3814	-675
6	Dave Marcis	3666	-823
7	Buddy Arrington	3642	-847
8	Ron Bouchard	3545	-944
9	Ricky Rudd	3542	-947
10 ▲	Morgan Shepherd	3451	-1038

Preceded by 1982 Atlanta Journal 500	NASCAR Winston Cup Series Season; 1982-3	Succeeded by 1983 Daytona 500

Preceded by 1981	Winston Western 500 races 1982	Succeeded by 1983
