= Don Puskarich =

American racing driver (born 1939)

- Born: February 26, 1939 (age 87); Garden Grove, California, U.S.
- Awards: 1975 NASCAR Winston West Series Rookie of the Year

NASCAR Cup Series career
- 17 races run over 8 years
- Best finish: 59th (1981)
- First race: 1975 Winston Western 500 (Riverside)
- Last race: 1982 Budweiser 400 (Riverside)
Wins	Top tens	Poles
0	0	0

ARCA Menards Series West career
- 70 races run over 9 years
- Best finish: 4th (1975)
- First race: 1974 Livermore 100 (Altamont)
- Last race: 1982 Warner W. Hodgdon 200 (Riverside)
Wins	Top tens	Poles
0	21	1
- Statistics up to date as of October 21, 2026.

Don Puskarich (born February 26, 1939) is an American former professional stock car racing driver. He competed in the NASCAR Winston Cup Series and NASCAR Winston West Series between 1974 and 1984. He won Rookie of the Year in the Winston West Series in 1975.

== Racing career ==
Puskarich began competing in the NASCAR Winston West Series in 1974, finishing fifth in his debut at Altamont Speedway; he finished tenth and fourth in his other starts at Clovis Speedway and Ascot Park respectively. He competed full-time in 1975, where in 18 races, he scored a pole and seven top-tens with a best finish of second at Santa Maria Speedway. He finished fourth in the standings and was awarded Rookie of the Year. The West Series schedule included three combination races, Puskarich's first NASCAR Winston Cup Series starts, where he scored a best finish of 12th in his debut at Riverside International Raceway.

Puskarich ran eight of thirteen Winston West races in 1976, with his lone top-ten being a fifth-place finish at Evergreen Speedway. He finished 27th and 21st in the Riverside combination race and fifteenth in the combination race at Ontario Motor Speedway.

Puskarich attempted twelve of twenty Winston West races in 1977, scoring five top-ten finishes with a best finish of seventh at Ascot Park and Craig Road Speedway. He finished 30th and 28th in the Riverside combination races and failed to qualify for the Ontario combination race. Puskarich also made his USAC Stock Car Series debut at Ontario, finishing 22nd due to overheating issues.

In 1978, Puskarich attempted four races, failing to qualify at Mesa Marin Raceway and Ontario and finishing 31st at Riverside and sixteenth at Sears Point International Raceway; the Riverside and Ontario races were combination races with the Winston Cup Series. He made his second and final USAC Stock Car start at Ontario, finishing last in the 28 car field due to an oil leak after four laps.

Puskarich's lone NASCAR start of 1979 came in the Winston Cup and Winston West season opener at Riverside, where he finished 28th. He would run his second and final full-time Winston West season in 1980, where he scored one top-ten, a tenth-place finish in a standalone race at Ontario, in eleven races. He finished seventh in the standings. Puskarich finished 19th and 17th in the Riverside combination races and last in 42nd due to engine issues after two laps in the Ontario combination race.

In 1981, Puskarich ran ten of fourteen Winston West races, tying his career best finish of second at Sears Point, his only top-ten of the season. There were three Riverside combination races in 1981, where Puskarich finished 32nd, seventeenth, and 21st. His final Winston West season was 1982, where he scored three top-tens with a best finish of eighth at All American Speedway. In his final Winston Cup start, a combination race at Riverside, he finished 20th.

After not making any NASCAR attempts in 1983, Puskarich made a final attempt at Riverside in 1984, failing to qualify.

== Motorsports career results ==
=== NASCAR ===
(key) (Bold – Pole position awarded by qualifying time. Italics – Pole position earned by points standings or practice time. * – Most laps led.)

==== Winston Cup Series ====
NASCAR Winston Cup Series results
Year	Team	No.	Make	1	2	3	4	5	6	7	8	9	10	11	12	13	14	15	16	17	18	19	20	21	22	23	24	25	26	27	28	29	30	31	NWCSC	Pts	Ref
1975	Puskarich Racing	13W	Chevy	RSD; 12	DAY	RCH	CAR	BRI	ATL	NWS	DAR	MAR	TAL	NSV	DOV	CLT																			65th	246	
1975	Puskarich Racing	13	Chevy														RSD; 32	MCH	DAY	NSV	POC	TAL	MCH	DAR	DOV	NWS	MAR	CLT	RCH	CAR	BRI	ATL			65th	246	
1975	Puskarich Racing	10	Dodge																														ONT; 37		65th	246	
1976	Puskarich Racing	13	Chevy	RSD; 27	DAY	CAR	RCH	BRI	ATL	NWS	DAR	MAR	TAL	NSV	DOV	CLT	RSD; 21	MCH	DAY	NSV	POC	TAL	MCH	BRI	DAR	RCH	DOV	MAR	NWS	CLT	CAR	ATL	ONT; 15		62nd	300	
1977	Puskarich Racing	13	Chevy	RSD; 30	DAY	RCH	CAR	ATL	NWS	DAR	BRI	MAR	TAL	NSV	DOV	CLT	RSD; 28	MCH	DAY	NSV	POC	TAL	MCH	BRI	DAR	RCH	DOV	MAR	NWS	CLT	CAR	ATL	ONT; DNQ		83rd	152	
1978	Puskarich Racing	13	Chevy	RSD; 31	DAY	RCH	CAR	ATL	BRI	DAR	NWS	MAR	TAL	DOV	CLT	NSV	RSD	MCH	DAY	NSV	POC	TAL	MCH	BRI	DAR	RCH	DOV	MAR	NWS	CLT	CAR	ATL	ONT; DNQ		99th	70	
1979	Puskarich Racing	13	Chevy	RSD; 28	DAY	CAR	RCH	ATL	NWS	BRI	DAR	MAR	TAL	NSV	DOV	CLT	TWS	RSD	MCH	DAY	NSV	POC	TAL	MCH	BRI	DAR	RCH	DOV	MAR	CLT	NWS	CAR	ATL	ONT	113th	79	
1980	Puskarich Racing	13	Chevy	RSD; 19	DAY	RCH	CAR	ATL	BRI	DAR	NWS	MAR	TAL	NSV	DOV	CLT	TWS	RSD; 17	MCH	DAY	NSV	POC	TAL	MCH	BRI	DAR	RCH	DOV	NWS	MAR	CLT	CAR	ATL	ONT; 42	61st	255	
1981	Puskarich Racing	13	Chevy	RSD; 32	DAY	RCH	CAR	ATL	BRI	NWS	DAR	MAR	TAL	NSV	DOV	CLT	TWS																		59th	279	
1981	Puskarich Racing	13	Olds															RSD; 17	MCH	DAY	NSV	POC	TAL	MCH	BRI	DAR	RCH	DOV	MAR	NWS	CLT	CAR	ATL	RSD; 21	59th	279	
1982	Puskarich Racing	13	Buick	DAY	RCH	BRI	ATL	CAR	DAR	NWS	MAR	TAL	NSV	DOV	CLT	POC	RSD; 20	MCH	DAY	NSV	POC	TAL	MCH	BRI	DAR	RCH	DOV	NWS	CLT	MAR	CAR	ATL	RSD		85th	103	
1984	Unknown	13	Unknown	DAY	RCH	CAR	ATL	BRI	NWS	DAR	MAR	TAL	NSV	DOV	CLT	RSD; DNQ	POC	MCH	DAY	NSV	POC	TAL	MCH	BRI	DAR	RCH	DOV	MAR	CLT	NWS	CAR	ATL	RSD		127th	0	

==== Winston West Series ====
NASCAR Winston West Series results
Year	Team	No.	Make	1	2	3	4	5	6	7	8	9	10	11	12	13	14	15	16	17	18	19	20	21	22	23	24	25	26	27	28	NWWSC	Pts	Ref
1974	Puskarich Racing	13	Chevy	RSD	AMP	S99	MSP	COR	SBP	ASP	RSD	WER	WSP	SPS	STA	USP	POR	MED	EUG	CBS	CAJ	CRS	ASP	AMP; 5	CSP; 10	EVG	YAK	POR	SGB	ASP; 4	ONT	27th	374.75	
1975	Puskarich Racing	13	Chevy	RSD; 12	LAG; 21	MSP; 16	ASP; 9	RSD; 32	ASP; 10	USP; 12	POR; 15	EVG; 20	**SMS**; 2	CRS; 6	CSP; 9	ASP; 9	EVG; 13	YAK; 21	POR; 15	MSP; 6												4th	1027	
1975	Puskarich Racing	10	Dodge																		ONT; 37											4th	1027	
1976	Puskarich Racing	13	Chevy	RSD; 27	RSD; 21	EVG	WSP	USP	POR	SHA	SGS; 16	EVG; 5	YAK; 16	POR; 13	LAG; 25	ONT; 15																13th	424.75	
1977	Puskarich Racing	13	Chevy	RSD; 30	LAG; 12	ONT; 13	SJS; 13	MMR; 10	ASP; 7	RSD; 28	SGS; 10	YAK	EVG	WSP	USP	POR	AAS	CRS; 7	ASP; 10	SHA	POR	ONT; DNQ	PHO; 21									11th	764	
1978	Puskarich Racing	13	Chevy	RSD; 31	AAS	S99	SHA	PET	MMR; DNQ	RSD	IFS	YAK	WSP	LSP	EVG	POR	CRS	ASP	SON; 16	SHA	CBS	YAK	OSS	ONT; DNQ	PHO							NA	105	
1979	Puskarich Racing	13	Chevy	RSD; 28	MMR	RSD	EVG	YAK	POR	AAS	SHA	CRS	SON	EVG	SPO	POR	ASP	ONT	PHO													NA	79	
1980	Puskarich Racing	13	Chevy	RSD; 19	ONT; 10	S99; 18	RSD; 17						ONT; 42																			7th	390	
1980	Puskarich Racing	13	Olds					LAG; 18	EVG; 28	POR; 18	SON; 23	MMR; 18		PHO; 23																		7th	390	
1981	Puskarich Racing	13	Chevy	RSD; 32																												9th	394	
1981	Puskarich Racing	13	Olds		S99; 11	AAS; 20	MMR; 16	RSD; 17	LAG; 13	POR	WSP	EVG	SHA	RSD; 22	SON; 2	RSD; 21	PHO; 24															9th	394	
1982	Puskarich Racing	13	Olds	MMR; 9	S99; 9	AAS; 8																										16th	236	
1982	Puskarich Racing	13	Buick				RSD; 20	POR; 13	WSP	SHA	EVG	SON	CDR	RSD; 23	RSD	PHO																16th	236	
