= Steve Pfeifer =

American racing driver (born 1938)

- Born: October 4, 1938 (age 88); San Francisco, California, U.S.

NASCAR Cup Series career
- 8 races run over 4 years
- Best finish: 77th (1980)
- First race: 1978 Los Angeles Times 500 (Ontario)
- Last race: 1981 Warner W. Hodgdon 400 (Riverside)
Wins	Top tens	Poles
0	0	0

ARCA Menards Series career
- Best finish: N/A (1981)

ARCA Menards Series West career
- 53 races run over 9 years
- Best finish: 10th (1980)
- First race: 1976 Winston Monterey 100 (Laguna Seca)
- Last race: 1985 Stroh's Beer 200 (Kent)
Wins	Top tens	Poles
0	3	0
- Statistics up to date as of October 5, 2026.

Steve Pfeifer (born October 4, 1938) is an American former professional stock car racing driver. He primarily competed in the NASCAR Winston West Series from 1976 to 1985. He is best known for his crash in the 1979 Gabriel 400, where he went over the pit wall while filling in for Roger Hamby.

== Racing career ==
Pfeifer began competing in the USAC Stock Car Series in 1971, running four races with a best finish of twelfth at New Bremen Speedway. He made one start in 1972, finishing seventeenth at the Indianapolis Raceway Park Road Course. He also attempted two NASCAR Winston Cup Series races at Ontario Motor Speedway and Michigan International Speedway, failing to qualifying for both events. Pfeifer made his NASCAR Winston West Series debut in 1976, finishing last in 26th after a second-lap crash at Laguna Seca Raceway. He failed to qualify for the combination race at Ontario. Pfeifer made twelve Winston West starts in 1977, scoring his first top-ten at All American Speedway. He failed to qualify for the first combination race at Riverside International Raceway as well as the Ontario combination race. Pfeifer ran 18 of 22 Winston West races in 1978, scoring his only career top-five with a fifth-place finish at Craig Road Speedway. He failed to qualify for the combination races at Riverside but would make his Winston Cup debut in the Ontario combination race, finishing 32nd due to battery issues. He also returned to the USAC Stock Car Series, finishing sixteenth at Ontario. Pfeifer made two Winston West starts in 1979, finishing eighteenth at Sears Point International Raceway and twentieth at Phoenix International Raceway. He failed to qualify for the first Riverside combination race and would finish 32nd in the second due to a fire after eight laps; he also competed at Charlotte Motor Speedway, finishing 30th, and Atlanta International Raceway, finishing 34th due to a crash. In the 1979 Gabriel 400 at Michigan International Speedway, Pfeifer relieved Roger Hamby. He was involved in a crash that sent him over the pit wall while coming in for a pit stop, resulting in cuts over his right knee and on his chest and a right foot injury to photographer Ray Crook. Pfeifer also made his final USAC Stock Car start in 1979, finishing fifteenth at Ontario. He ran nine Winston West races in 1980, scoring his third and final career top-ten with a sixth-place finish at Sears Point. He finished 27th and 21st in the combination races at Riverside. Pfeifer made four Winston West starts in 1981 with a best finish of fourteenth at Riverside. He finished 24th in the first Riverside combination race and the aforementioned fourteenth place also came in a Riverside combination race. 1981 also saw Pfeifer make his only ARCA Racing Series attempt at Daytona International Speedway, failing to qualify. Pfeifer made three Winston West starts in 1982, scoring a best finish of seventeenth at Sears Point. He withdrew from the first Riverside combination race. Pfeifer ran three Winston West races again in 1983 with a best finish of fourteenth at Evergreen Speedway. He failed to qualify for the Winston Cup finale at Riverside, his final career Winston Cup attempt. He made his final Winston West start in 1985, finishing fifteenth at Seattle International Raceway due to engine issues. In 1988, Pfeifer ran seven of eight races in the SCCA Escort Endurance Championship with a best overall finish of eighth at Sears Point and a best class finish of second at Sears Point and Brainerd International Raceway. He ran six of eight races in 1989, scoring a best overall finish of fifteenth at Sears Point and a best class finish of third at Road Atlanta. Pfeifer ran the 1998 24 Hours of Daytona for Fantasy Junction-Coys Racing, and with co-drivers Bruce Trenery, Spencer Trenery, Graheme Bryant, and Kent Painter, finished 41st overall and eleventh in the Can-Am class. He ran the race again in 1999, this time for Pettit Racing, and with co-drivers Cameron Worth, Scott Sansone, and Ryan Hampton, where he finished 30th overall and seventh in the GT2 class.

== Motorsports career results ==
=== NASCAR ===
(key) (Bold – Pole position awarded by qualifying time. Italics – Pole position earned by points standings or practice time. * – Most laps led.)

==== Winston Cup Series ====
NASCAR Winston Cup Series results
Year	Team	No.	Make	1	2	3	4	5	6	7	8	9	10	11	12	13	14	15	16	17	18	19	20	21	22	23	24	25	26	27	28	29	30	31	NWCSC	Pts	Ref
1972	Pfeifer Racing	08	Chevy	RSD	DAY	RCH	ONT; DNQ	CAR	ATL	BRI	DAR	NWS	MAR	TAL	CLT	DOV	MCH; DNQ	RSD	TWS	DAY	BRI	TRN	ATL	TAL	MCH	NSV	DAR	RCH	DOV	MAR	NWS	CLT	CAR	TWS	NA	0	
1976	David Hails	0	Chevy	RSD	DAY	CAR	RCH	BRI	ATL	NWS	DAR	MAR	TAL	NSV	DOV	CLT	RSD	MCH	DAY	NSV	POC	TAL	MCH	BRI	DAR	RCH	DOV	MAR	NWS	CLT	CAR	ATL	ONT; DNQ		143rd	0	
1977	Pfeifer Racing	0	Chevy	RSD; DNQ	DAY	RCH	CAR	ATL	NWS	DAR	BRI	MAR	TAL	NSV	DOV	CLT	RSD	MCH	DAY	NSV	POC	TAL	MCH	BRI	DAR	RCH	DOV	MAR	NWS	CLT	CAR	ATL			144th	0	
1977	McCluney Racing	60	Chevy																														ONT; DNQ		144th	0	
1978	McCluney Racing	0	Chevy	RSD; DNQ	DAY	RCH	CAR	ATL	BRI	DAR	NWS	MAR	TAL	DOV	CLT	NSV	RSD; DNQ	MCH	DAY	NSV	POC	TAL	MCH	BRI	DAR	RCH	DOV	MAR	NWS	CLT	CAR	ATL	ONT; 32		100th	67	
1979	McCluney Racing	0	Chevy	RSD; DNQ	DAY	CAR	RCH	ATL	NWS	BRI	DAR	MAR	TAL	NSV	DOV	CLT	TWS	RSD; 32																	85th	134	
1979	Hamby Motorsports	17	Chevy																MCH; RL^{†}	DAY	NSV	POC	TAL	MCH	BRI	DAR	RCH	DOV	MAR	CLT; 30	NWS	CAR	ATL; 34	ONT	85th	134	
1980	Don Guy Racing	57	Chevy	RSD; 27	DAY	RCH	CAR	ATL	BRI	DAR	NWS	MAR	TAL	NSV	DOV	CLT	TWS																		77th	182	
1980	Kord-Pfeifer Racing	94	Chevy															RSD; 21	MCH	DAY	NSV	POC	TAL	MCH	BRI	DAR	RCH	DOV	NWS	MAR	CLT	CAR	ATL	ONT	77th	182	
1981	Pfeifer Racing	94	Chevy	RSD; 24	DAY	RCH	CAR	ATL	BRI	NWS	DAR	MAR	TAL	NSV	DOV	CLT	TWS																		86th	91	
1981	Hamby Motorsports	17	Chevy															RSD; 14	MCH	DAY	NSV	POC	TAL	MCH	BRI	DAR	RCH	DOV	MAR	NWS	CLT	CAR	ATL	RSD	86th	91	
1982	McCluney Racing	0	Pontiac	DAY	RCH	BRI	ATL	CAR	DAR	NWS	MAR	TAL	NSV	DOV	CLT	POC	RSD; Wth	MCH	DAY	NSV	POC	TAL	MCH	BRI	DAR	RCH	DOV	NWS	CLT	MAR	CAR	ATL	RSD		138th	0	
1983	Unknown	8	Unknown	DAY	RCH	CAR	ATL	DAR	NWS	MAR	TAL	NSV	DOV	BRI	CLT	RSD	POC	MCH	DAY	NSV	POC	TAL	MCH	BRI	DAR	RCH	DOV	MAR	NWS	CLT	CAR	ATL	RSD; DNQ		135th	0	
^{†} – Relieved Roger Hamby

==== Winston West Series ====
NASCAR Winston West Series results
Year	Team	No.	Make	1	2	3	4	5	6	7	8	9	10	11	12	13	14	15	16	17	18	19	20	21	22	23	24	25	26	27	28	29	30	NWWSC	Pts	Ref
1972	Pfeifer Racing	08	Chevy	RSD	ONT; DNQ	SJS	S99	SMN	TCR	YAK	EVG	RSD	MED	POR	IFS	MER	SPS	LSP	WSP	SKA	RAS	CRS	OSS	SGS	CSP	BKS	EVG	USP	YAK	POR	ASP	WCR	SMN	NA	0	
1973	Pfeifer Racing	08	Chevy	AMP	MAD	S99	AUR	KFS	CBS	USP	POR	SPS	WER	SGS	CAJ	OSS	CSP	BKS	LAG; DNQ	EVG	WSP	YAK	POR	AMP										NA	0	
1976	David Hails	0	Chevy	RSD	RSD	EVG	WSP	USP	POR	SHA	SGS	EVG	YAK	POR	LAG; 26	ONT; DNQ																		NA	25.75	
1977	Pfeifer Racing	0	Chevy	RSD	LAG; 29	ONT; 22	SJS; 20	MMR	ASP; 18	RSD	SGS	YAK	EVG	WSP; 15	USP	POR; 19	AAS; 10	CRS; 16	ASP; 23	SHA; 12			PHO; 14											14th	661.5	
1977	Unknown	36	Chevy																		POR; 23													14th	661.5	
1977	McCluney Racing	60	Chevy																			ONT; DNQ												14th	661.5	
1978	McCluney Racing	0	Chevy	RSD; DNQ	AAS																			ONT; 32	PHO; DNQ									12th	693	
1978	McCluney Racing	0	Olds			S99; 15	SHA; 14	PET; 13	MMR; 12	RSD	IFS; 11	YAK; 14	WSP; 21	LSP; 17	EVG; 16	POR; 18	CRS; 5	ASP; 14	SON; 11	SHA; 21	CBS; 13	YAK; 19	OSS; 12											12th	693	
1979	McCluney Racing	0	Chevy	RSD; DNQ	MMR	RSD	EVG	YAK	POR	AAS	SHA	CRS	SON; 18	EVG	SPO	POR	ASP	ONT																28th	134	
1979	Hamby Motorsports	17	Chevy																PHO; 20															28th	134	
1980	Don Guy Racing	57	Chevy	RSD; 27																														10th	325	
1980	Pfeifer Racing	57	Chevy		ONT; 29																													10th	325	
1980	Kord Racing	94	Chevy			S99; 19																												10th	325	
1980	Kord-Pfiefer Racing	94	Chevy				RSD; 21	LAG; 11			SON; 6			PHO; 21																				10th	325	
1980	Kord Racing	74	Pontiac						EVG; 21	POR																								10th	325	
1980	Davis Racing	22	Dodge									MMR; 15	ONT																					10th	325	
1981	Pfeifer Racing	94	Chevy	RSD; 24	S99	AAS	MMR																											33rd	76	
1981	Hamby Motorsports	17	Chevy					RSD; 14																										33rd	76	
1981	Kord-Pfiefer Racing	94	Olds						LAG; 18	POR	WSP	EVG	SHA	RSD	SON	RSD																		33rd	76	
1981	Unknown	66	Pontiac														PHO; 21																	33rd	76	
1982	Pfeifer Racing	0	Pontiac	MMR	S99	AAS	RSD; Wth	POR	WSP	SHA	EVG	SON; 17	CDR	RSD; 21	RSD	PHO; 19																		23rd	156	
1983	Mike Gustafson	3	Pontiac	S99	SON; 16	RSD	YAK																											22nd	157	
1983	Mike Gustafson	0	Pontiac					EVG; 14	SHA	RSD; 23	CPL	RSD	PHO																					22nd	157	
1985	KC Racing	91	Olds	SON	SHA	RSD	MMR	SIR; 15	POR	STA	YAK	EVG	WSR	MMR	RSD																			46th	36	

=== ARCA ===
==== ARCA Racing Series ====
ARCA Racing Series results
Year	Team	No.	Make	1	2	3	4	5	6	7	8	ARSC	Pts	Ref
1981	Hamby Motorsports	17	Chevy	DAY; DNQ	DSP	FRS	FRS	BFS	TAL	FRS	COR	NA	0	
