= Gary Johnson (racing driver) =

American racing driver (born 1940)

- Born: May 12, 1940 (age 86); Modesto, California, U.S.
- Awards: 1976 NASCAR Winston West Series Rookie of the Year

NASCAR Cup Series career
- 4 races run over 3 years
- Best finish: 75th (1977)
- First race: 1976 Winston Western 500 (Riverside)
- Last race: 1978 Winston Western 500 (Riverside)
Wins	Top tens	Poles
0	0	0

ARCA Menards Series West career
- 59 races run over 8 years
- Best finish: 3rd (1976)
- First race: 1974 Livermore 100 (Altamont)
- Last race: 1986 AC-Delco 300 (Sonoma)
- First win: 1976 Winston Monterey 100 (Laguna Seca)
- Last win: 1978 Winston Spokane 100 (Spokane)
Wins	Top tens	Poles
3	26	5
- Statistics up to date as of May 12, 2026.

Gary Johnson (born May 12, 1940) is an American former professional stock car racing driver. He competed in the NASCAR Winston Cup Series and NASCAR Winston West Series. He is not related to Jimmie Johnson, whose father is also named Gary.

== Racing career ==
Johnson competed in the NASCAR Late Model Sportsman National Championship in 1961 and in the NASCAR Modified National Championship in 1962 and 1964, finishing top-fifteen in the standings both years in the latter series.

In 1974, Johnson began competing in the NASCAR Winston West Series, driving a self-owned Dodge for four races. After a hiatus in 1975, Johnson returned to the series in 1976, attempting all but one race. He scored three poles and seven top-tens, as well as his first career win at Laguna Seca. Johnson was awarded rookie of the year. Johnson ended the season third in points. In running a majority of the West schedule, Johnson made his NASCAR Winston Cup Series debut at Riverside International Raceway, finishing 29th.

Johnson competed full-time in the West Series in 1977, scoring a pole, seven top tens, and a win at Ontario Motor Speedway, finishing fourth in the standings. He qualified for two Winston Cup races, finishing twentieth in the season opener. Johnson scaled back to part-time in 1978, running sixteen races, scoring a pole, nine top tens, and his final career win, coming at Spokane's Interstate Fairgrounds Speedway. This season saw him make his final Cup start, where rear end issues took him out of the season opener at Riverside after just three laps, and his final attempt, coming at the second Riverside race, where he failed to qualify.

Johnson made three West starts in 1979, failing to finish any races due to brake issues at All American Speedway and crashing out at Shasta Speedway and Sears Point International Raceway. He competed in the Rose Classic at All American Speedway, finishing eleventh. After not competing in the West Series in 1980, Johnson returned for four races in 1981, scoring two top-tens, including a fourth at Riverside. His next start came in 1983, where he finished eighth at Sears Point. He made his final career start in 1986, finishing twentieth at Sears Point due to overheating. Johnson finished thirteenth in the Ocean Speedway track championship in 1993. He attempted to qualify for the Tuckasee Toilet Bowl Classic in 2008.

== Motorsports career results ==
=== NASCAR ===
(key) (Bold – Pole position awarded by qualifying time. Italics – Pole position earned by points standings or practice time. * – Most laps led.)

==== Winston Cup Series ====
NASCAR Winston Cup Series results
Year	Team	No.	Make	1	2	3	4	5	6	7	8	9	10	11	12	13	14	15	16	17	18	19	20	21	22	23	24	25	26	27	28	29	30	NWCSC	Pts	Ref
1976	Al Clark	44	Dodge	RSD; 29	DAY	CAR	RCH	BRI	ATL	NWS	DAR	MAR	TAL	NSV	DOV	CLT	RSD	MCH	DAY	NSV	POC	TAL	MCH	BRI	DAR	RCH	DOV	MAR	NWS	CLT	CAR	ATL		79th	126	
1976	Al Clark	44	Chevy																														ONT; DNQ	79th	126	
1977	Al Clark	44	Chevy	RSD; 20	DAY	RCH	CAR	ATL	NWS	DAR	BRI	MAR	TAL	NSV	DOV	CLT	RSD; 29	MCH	DAY	NSV	POC	TAL	MCH	BRI	DAR	RCH	DOV	MAR	NWS	CLT	CAR	ATL	ONT; DNQ	75th	179	
1978	Ted Armstrong	44	Chevy	RSD; 35	DAY	RCH	CAR	ATL	BRI	DAR	NWS	MAR	TAL	DOV	CLT	NSV	RSD; DNQ	MCH	DAY	NSV	POC	TAL	MCH	BRI	DAR	RCH	DOV	MAR	NWS	CLT	CAR	ATL	ONT	104th	58	

==== Winston West Series ====
NASCAR Winston West Series results
Year	Team	No.	Make	1	2	3	4	5	6	7	8	9	10	11	12	13	14	15	16	17	18	19	20	21	22	23	24	25	26	27	28	NWWSC	Pts	Ref
1974	Johnson Racing	7	Dodge	RSD	AMP	S99	MSP	COR	SBP	ASP	RSD	WER	WSP	SPS	STA	USP	POR	MED	EUG	CBS	CAJ	CRS	ASP	AMP; 24	CSP			POR; 24	SGB	ASP	ONT	48th	144	
1974	Johnson Racing	71	Dodge																							EVG; 26	YAK; 18					48th	144	
1976	Al Clark	44	Dodge	RSD; 29	RSD																											3rd	813	
1976	Al Clark	4	Chevy			EVG; 3																										3rd	813	
1976	Al Clark	44	Chevy				WSP; 12	USP; 5	POR; 6	SHA; 2	SGS; 4	EVG; 20	YAK; 8	POR; 15	LAG; 1*	ONT; DNQ																3rd	813	
1977	Al Clark	44	Chevy	RSD; 20	LAG; 3	ONT; 1*	SJS; 7	MMR; 13	ASP; 10	RSD; 29	SGS; 18	YAK; 13	EVG; 16	WSP; 6	USP; 11	POR; 17	AAS; 15		ASP; 9	SHA; 15	POR; 3	ONT; DNQ	PHO; 17									4th	1284.5	
1977	Johnson Racing	7	Chevy															CRS; 17														4th	1284.5	
1978	Ted Armstrong	44	Chevy	RSD; 35																												11th	696	
1978	Ted Armstrong	44	Pontiac		AAS; 3	S99; 6	SHA; 3	PET; 11	MMR; 18	RSD	IFS; 1	YAK; 5	WSP; 19	LSP	EVG; 20	POR; 20	CRS	ASP	SON; 2	SHA; 8	CBS	YAK; 11	OSS; 9	ONT	PHO; 8							11th	696	
1979	Ted Armstrong	44	Pontiac	RSD	MMR	RSD	EVG	YAK	POR	AAS; 14	SHA; 15	CRS	SON; 23	EVG	SPO	POR	ASP	ONT	PHO													33rd	101	
1981	Unknown	4	Pontiac	RSD	S99; 6	AAS; 12	MMR	RSD	LAG	POR	WSP	EVG	SHA	RSD; 4	SON; 12*	RSD	PHO															27th	84	
1983	John Edgett	74	Buick	S99	SON; 8	RSD	YAK	EVG	SHA	RSD	CPL	RSD	PHO																			34th	43	
1986	Kieper Racing	98	Chevy	SON; 20	RSD	EVG	RCS	TAC	PIR	WSR	RSD																					44th	31	
