= Chuck Wahl =

American racing driver (born 1950)

- Born: December 20, 1950 (age 75); Burbank, California, U.S.

NASCAR Cup Series career
- 13 races run over 7 years
- Best finish: 71st (1976, 1977)
- First race: 1973 Tuborg 400 (Riverside)
- Last race: 1980 Winston Western 500 (Riverside)
Wins	Top tens	Poles
0	2	0

ARCA Menards Series West career
- 80 races run over 7 years
- Best finish: 3rd (1975)
- First race: 1972 Saugus 150 (Saugus)
- Last race: 1980 Winston Western 500 (Riverside)
- First win: 1975 Monterey Triple Crown (Laguna Seca)
- Last win: 1975 Las Vegas 100 (Craig Road)
Wins	Top tens	Poles
2	38	2
- Statistics up to date as of May 14, 2026.

Chuck Wahl (born December 20, 1950) is an American former professional stock car racing driver. He competed in the NASCAR Winston Cup Series and NASCAR Winston West Series.

== Racing career ==
Wahl began competing in the NASCAR Winston West Series in 1972, debuting at Saugus Speedway, where he finished fifteenth; he ran five more races, scoring four top-tens. He expanded to running fifteen races in 1973, scoring his first top-five at Cajon Speedway as well as four other top-tens, however he only finished six races of the fifteen. In running these West races, he made his NASCAR Winston Cup Series debut at Riverside International Raceway, finishing thirty-ninth after water pump issues caused him to retire after seven laps. Wahl ran twenty-three of twenty-eight West Series races in 1974, scoring a pole and eleven top-ten finishes. This schedule included two combination races with the Winston Cup Series, where he scored his first Cup top ten at Riverside despite running out of fuel and not finishing the race, and finished twentieth at Ontario Motor Speedway. Wahl ran the full West schedule for the first time in his career in 1975, driving the No. 37 Chevrolet for Joe Marsik. In eighteen races, he scored a pole, ten top-tens, seven of which were top-fives and two of which were wins. His first win came in the season's second race at Laguna Seca Raceway, and the second came in the race at Craig Road Speedway, where he led every lap. Wahl finished third in the final standings. In the Cup Series events, mechanical problems took him out of two races, but he did finish the second Riverside race, scoring a career-best seventh place result. Wahl returned to the West Series full time in 1976, attempting all thirteen races, scoring five top-tens, including three third place finishes. In the Cup Series races, Wahl finished twenty-second in the season opener at Riverside, leading laps for the first and only time in his Winston Cup career, and thirteenth in the second Riverside race; he failed to qualify for the finale at Ontario. Wahl only competed in five West Series races in 1977, scoring two runner-up finishes. He finished twenty-sixth and eighteenth in the Cup Series races at Riverside. Wahl also made his first and only start in the USAC Stock Car Series in 1977, finishing twenty-first at Ontario due to engine issues. In 1978, Wahl only competed in combination races, not running for West Series points. He failed to qualify for the season opener at Riverside, finished twenty-eighth due to an oil leak in the second Riverside race, and finished thirty-sixth due to overheating issues at Ontario. Wahl did not compete in NASCAR in 1979. He made his final start in both the West and Cup series in 1980 Winston Western 500, finishing twenty-fifth. He competed in the 1980 Copper World Classic at Phoenix Raceway, finishing fourth.

== Motorsports career results ==
=== NASCAR ===
(key) (Bold – Pole position awarded by qualifying time. Italics – Pole position earned by points standings or practice time. * – Most laps led.)

==== Winston Cup Series ====
NASCAR Winston Cup Series results
Year	Team	No.	Make	1	2	3	4	5	6	7	8	9	10	11	12	13	14	15	16	17	18	19	20	21	22	23	24	25	26	27	28	29	30	31	NWCSC	Pts	Ref
1973	Wahl Racing	37	Chevy	RSD	DAY	RCH	CAR	BRI	ATL	NWS	DAR	MAR	TAL	NSV	CLT	DOV	TWS	RSD; 39	MCH	DAY	BRI	ATL	TAL	NSV	DAR	RCH	DOV	NWS	MAR	CLT	CAR				123rd	NA	
1974	Joe Marsik	37W	Chevy	RSD	DAY	RCH	CAR	BRI	ATL	DAR	NWS	MAR	TAL	NSV	DOV	CLT	RSD; 8	MCH	DAY	BRI	NSV	ATL	POC	TAL	MCH	DAR	RCH	DOV	NWS	MAR	CLT	CAR	ONT; 20		74th	5.4	
1975	Joe Marsik	37W	Chevy	RSD; 17	DAY	RCH	CAR	BRI	ATL	NWS	DAR	MAR	TAL	NSV	DOV	CLT																			56th	322	
1975	Joe Marsik	37	Chevy														RSD; 7	MCH	DAY	NSV	POC	TAL	MCH	DAR	DOV	NWS	MAR	CLT	RCH	CAR	BRI	ATL	ONT; 35		56th	322	
1976	Wahl Racing	37	Chevy	RSD; 22	DAY	CAR	RCH	BRI	ATL	NWS	DAR	MAR	TAL	NSV	DOV	CLT	RSD; 13	MCH	DAY	NSV	POC	TAL	MCH	BRI	DAR	RCH	DOV	MAR	NWS	CLT	CAR	ATL	ONT; DNQ		71st	226	
1977	Wahl Racing	37	Chevy	RSD; 26	DAY	RCH	CAR	ATL	NWS	DAR	BRI	MAR	TAL	NSV	DOV	CLT	RSD; 18	MCH	DAY	NSV	POC	TAL	MCH	BRI	DAR	RCH	DOV	MAR	NWS	CLT	CAR	ATL	ONT		71st	194	
1978	Wahl Racing	37	Chevy	RSD; DNQ	DAY	RCH	CAR	ATL	BRI	DAR	NWS	MAR	TAL	DOV	CLT	NSV	RSD; 28	MCH	DAY	NSV	POC	TAL	MCH	BRI	DAR	RCH	DOV	MAR	NWS	CLT	CAR	ATL	ONT; 36		80th	134	
1980	Wahl Racing	37	Chevy	RSD; 25	DAY	RCH	CAR	ATL	BRI	DAR	NWS	MAR	TAL	NSV	DOV	CLT	TWS	RSD	MCH	DAY	NSV	POC	TAL	MCH	BRI	DAR	RCH	DOV	NWS	MAR	CLT	CAR	ATL	ONT	121st	NA	

==== Winston West Series ====
NASCAR Winston West Series results
Year	Team	No.	Make	1	2	3	4	5	6	7	8	9	10	11	12	13	14	15	16	17	18	19	20	21	22	23	24	25	26	27	28	29	30	NWWSC	Pts	Ref
1972	Wahl Racing	37	Chevy	RSD	ONT	SJS	S99	SMN	TCR	YAK	EVG	RSD	MED	POR	IFS	MER	SPS	LSP	WSP	SKA	RAS	CRS	OSS	SGS; 15	CSP	BKS; 7					ASP; 9		SMN; 11	28th	410	
1972	Wahl Racing	37	Ford																								EVG; 9	USP	YAK	POR		WCR; 9		28th	410	
1973	Wahl Racing	37	Chevy	AMP; 20	MAD; 9	S99; 16	AUR	KFS; 10	CBS; 15	USP; 17	POR	SPS	WER	SGS; 18	CAJ; 3	OSS; 8	CSP; 16	BKS; 6	LAG; 19	EVG; 24	WSP	YAK; 15	POR	AMP; 22										15th	824.25	
1974	Joe Marsik	37	Chevy	RSD	AMP; DNQ	S99; 12	MSP; 19	COR; 21	SBP; 10	ASP; 6		WER; 5	WSP; 17	SPS; 18	STA; 2	USP	POR; 2	MED; 10	EUG; 3	CBS; 17	CAJ; 18	CRS; 9	ASP; 17	**AMP**; 10	CSP	EVG; 29	YAK; 6	POR; 17	SGB; 11	ASP; 20				11th	1349.25	
1974	Joe Marsik	37W	Chevy								RSD; 8																				ONT; 20			11th	1349.25	
1975	Joe Marsik	37	Chevy	RSD; 17	LAG; 1	MSP; 18	ASP; 17	RSD; 7	ASP; 19																									3rd	1102.25	
1975	Wahl Racing	37	Chevy							USP; 5	**POR**; 4	EVG; 2	SMS; 16	**CRS**; 1*	CSP; 15	ASP; 11	EVG; 9	YAK; 3	POR; 3	MSP; 10	ONT; 35													3rd	1102.25	
1976	Wahl Racing	37	Chevy	RSD; 22	RSD; 13	EVG; 13	WSP; 3	USP; 11	POR; 3	SHA; 4	SGS; 14	EVG; 24	YAK; 18	POR; 9	LAG; 3	ONT; DNQ																		4th	752.5	
1977	Wahl Racing	37	Chevy	RSD; 26	LAG	ONT; 5	SJS	MMR; 2	ASP	RSD; 18	SGS; 2	YAK	EVG	WSP	USP	POR	AAS	CRS	ASP	SHA	POR	ONT	PHO											18th	401.75	
1978	Wahl Racing	37	Chevy	RSD; DNQ	AAS	S99	SHA	PET	MMR	RSD	IFS	YAK	WSP	LSP	EVG	POR	CRS	ASP	SON	SHA	CBS	YAK	OSS	ONT	PHO									NA	0	
1980	Wahl Racing	37	Chevy	RSD; 25	ONT	S99	RSD	LAG	EVG	POR	SON	MMR	ONT	PHO																				NA	45	
