= Earle Canavan =

American racing driver (1937–2016)

- Born: December 5, 1937; Portadown, Northern Ireland
- Died: February 9, 2016 (aged 78)

NASCAR Cup Series career
- 68 races run over 13 years
- Best finish: 32nd (1975)
- First race: 1969 Talladega 500 (Talladega)
- Last race: 1986 Goodwrench 500 (Rockingham)
Wins	Top tens	Poles
0	0	0

ARCA Menards Series West career
- 4 races run over 4 years
- Best finish: N/A
- First race: 1978 Arizona NAPA 250 (Phoenix)
- Last race: 1983 Coors 200 (Caesars Palae)
Wins	Top tens	Poles
0	0	0
- Statistics up to date as of July 29, 2010.

Earle Samuel Canavan (December 5, 1937 – February 9, 2016) was an American racing driver from Fort Johnson, New York.

Canavan immigrated to the United States from Northern Ireland in 1951. Always interested in racing and speed, he admired Malcolm Campbell and his land speed record car, "The Bluebird". Canavan built his first gas hot rod during high school. He was then drafted into the U.S. Army, serving his time at Fort Dix, New Jersey. After service and upon completing his gas rodder, Earle headed to California to compete in NHRA and IHRA events. As his interest in drag racing increased, he built the only Lincoln-powered AA/Fuel dragster, "The President Lincoln" and competed in National events and exhibitions. Preparing for entering oval track racing, Canavan became an independent competitor on the SCCA and FIA circuit with an American Motors Javelin.

Canavan participated in the NASCAR Winston Cup Series part-time from 1969 to 1986. His best points result came in 1975 when he drove in 12 of the 30 races and finished 32nd in points. Canavan was an owner-driver, fielding his own car.

Canavan also attempted to qualify for the Indianapolis 500 in 1979 but failed to make the race. He filed another entry for the race in 1981 but it was declined due to his lack of experience in open-wheel cars.

After his on track career, Canavan enjoyed building hot rods. He also manufactured aftermarket auto parts, working with his own new designs and special compounds.

Canavan was married to Elizabeth (Betty) in 1965. They had three daughters, Tracy Wager, Heather Gilbert, and April Simmons.

== Motorsports career results ==
=== NASCAR ===
(key) (Bold – Pole position awarded by qualifying time. Italics – Pole position earned by points standings or practice time. * – Most laps led.)

==== Grand National Series ====
NASCAR Grand National Series results
Year	Team	No.	Make	1	2	3	4	5	6	7	8	9	10	11	12	13	14	15	16	17	18	19	20	21	22	23	24	25	26	27	28	29	30	31	32	33	34	35	36	37	38	39	40	41	42	43	44	45	46	47	48	49	50	51	52	53	54	NGNC	Pts	Ref
1969	Canavan Racing	31	AMC	MGR	MGY	RSD	DAY	DAY	DAY	CAR	AUG	BRI	ATL	CLB	HCY	GPS	RCH	NWS	MAR	AWS	DAR	BLV	LGY	CLT	MGR	SMR	MCH	KPT	GPS	NCF	DAY	DOV	TPN	TRN	BLV	BRI	NSV	SMR	ATL	MCH	SBO	BGS	AWS	DAR	HCY	RCH	TAL; 26	CLB	MAR	NWS	CLT	SVH	AUG	CAR	JFC	MGR	TWS	NA	0	
1971	Canavan Racing	01	Plymouth	RSD	DAY	DAY	DAY	ONT	RCH	CAR	HCY	BRI	ATL	CLB	GPS	SMR	NWS	MAR	DAR	SBO	TAL	ASH	KPT	CLT	DOV	MCH	RSD	HOU	GPS	DAY	BRI	AST	ISP	TRN	NSV	ATL	BGS	ONA	MCH	TAL	CLB	HCY	DAR; DNQ		CLT; 33	DOV	CAR	MGR; 30	RCH	NWS; 29	TWS; 34							63rd	213	
1971	Canavan Racing	01	Chevy																																									MAR; 29														63rd	213	

==== Winston Cup Series ====
NASCAR Winston Cup Series results
Year	Team	No.	Make	1	2	3	4	5	6	7	8	9	10	11	12	13	14	15	16	17	18	19	20	21	22	23	24	25	26	27	28	29	30	31	NWCC	Pts	Ref
1972	Canavan Racing	41	Plymouth	RSD	DAY	RCH	ONT; 42	CAR	ATL	BRI	DAR	NWS	MAR																						62nd	755.5	
1972	Canavan Racing	01	Plymouth											TAL; DNQ	CLT	DOV; 35	MCH	RSD	TWS	DAY	BRI	TRN; 32	ATL	TAL	MCH; 39	NSV	DAR	RCH	DOV; 15	MAR	NWS			TWS; 42	62nd	755.5	
1972	Canavan Racing	01	Chevy																													CLT; 31	CAR		62nd	755.5	
1973	Canavan Racing	01	Plymouth	RSD	DAY; DNQ	RCH	CAR	BRI	ATL; 22	NWS	DAR; 12	MAR	TAL	NSV	CLT	DOV; 34	TWS	RSD	MCH; 12	DAY	BRI	ATL	TAL	NSV	DAR	RCH	DOV; 24	NWS	MAR	CLT	CAR				41st	1144.7	
1974	Canavan Racing	01	Plymouth	RSD	DAY; DNQ	RCH	CAR	BRI	ATL	DAR	NWS	MAR	TAL	NSV	DOV; 16	CLT	RSD	MCH	DAY	BRI	NSV	ATL	POC; 14	TAL	MCH; 15	DAR; 23	RCH	DOV; 17	NWS	MAR	CLT	CAR	ONT; 30		46th	34.92	
1975	Canavan Racing	01	Plymouth	RSD	DAY	RCH; 13				NWS; 25	DAR; 17	MAR																							32nd	1062	
1975	Canavan Racing	01	Dodge				CAR; 31	BRI; 23	ATL				TAL; 17	NSV; 17	DOV; 34	CLT	RSD	MCH	DAY	NSV	POC; 29	TAL	MCH; 32	DAR; 35	DOV; 25	NWS	MAR	CLT	RCH	CAR	BRI	ATL	ONT		32nd	1062	
1976	Canavan Racing	01	Dodge	RSD	DAY; DNQ	CAR	RCH; 18	BRI; 17	ATL	NWS	DAR; 19	MAR	TAL	NSV	DOV	CLT	RSD	MCH; 34	DAY	NSV	POC; 36	TAL	MCH	BRI	DAR; 29	RCH	DOV; 24	MAR	NWS	CLT	CAR	ATL	ONT; DNQ		43rd	610	
1977	Canavan Racing	01	Dodge	RSD	DAY	RCH	CAR	ATL	NWS	DAR; 36	BRI	MAR	TAL	NSV	DOV; 23	CLT	RSD	MCH	DAY	NSV	POC; 35	TAL	MCH; 36	BRI	DAR; 23	RCH	DOV	MAR	NWS	CLT	CAR	ATL			57th	301	
1977	Canavan Racing	10	Dodge																														ONT; DNQ		57th	301	
1978	Canavan Racing	01	Dodge	RSD	DAY; DNQ	RCH; 24	CAR; 24	ATL	BRI	DAR; 22	NWS	MAR	TAL	DOV; 20	CLT	NSV	RSD	MCH; 33	DAY	NSV	POC	TAL; 31	MCH; 32	BRI	DAR; 39	RCH	DOV; 16	MAR	NWS	CLT	CAR	ATL	ONT; DNQ		42nd	559	
1979	Canavan Racing	01	Dodge	RSD	DAY	CAR	RCH	ATL	NWS	BRI	DAR; 35	MAR	TAL	NSV	DOV	CLT	TWS; 18	RSD	MCH	DAY	NSV	POC; 27	TAL	MCH; 34	BRI	DAR; 39	RCH; 22	DOV; 33	MAR	CLT	NWS	CAR	ATL	ONT	41st	456	
1982	Canavan Racing	13	Olds	DAY	RCH	BRI	ATL	CAR	DAR	NWS	MAR	TAL	NSV	DOV	CLT	POC	RSD	MCH	DAY	NSV	POC	TAL	MCH; 37	BRI											102nd	-	
1982	Canavan Racing	13	Buick																						DAR; 39	RCH	DOV	NWS	CLT	MAR	CAR	ATL	RSD		102nd	-	
1985	Canavan Racing	01	Olds	DAY	RCH	CAR	ATL	BRI	DAR	NWS	MAR	TAL	DOV	CLT	RSD	POC	MCH	DAY	POC	TAL	MCH	BRI	DAR	RCH	DOV; 36	MAR	NWS	CLT	CAR	ATL	RSD				91st	55	
1986	Canavan Racing	01	Pontiac	DAY	RCH	CAR; 32	ATL	BRI; DNQ	DAR; DNQ	NWS; DNQ	MAR	TAL	DOV	CLT	RSD	POC	MCH	DAY	POC	TAL	GLN	MCH	BRI	DAR	RCH	DOV	MAR	NWS	CLT	CAR	ATL	RSD			114th	67	

===== Daytona 500 =====
Year	Team	Manufacturer	Start	Finish
1973	Canavan Racing	Plymouth	DNQ	
1974	Canavan Racing	Plymouth	DNQ	
1976	Canavan Racing	Dodge	DNQ	
1978	Canavan Racing	Dodge	DNQ	

==== Winston West Series ====
NASCAR Winston West Series results
Year	Team	No.	Make	1	2	3	4	5	6	7	8	9	10	11	12	13	14	15	16	17	18	19	20	21	22	Pos.	Pts	Ref
1976	Canavan Racing	01	Dodge	RSD	RSD	EVG	WSP	USP	POR	SHA	SGS	EVG	YAK	POR	LAG	ONT; DNQ										NA	-	
1977	Canavan Racing	10	Dodge	RSD	LAG	ONT	SJS	MMR	ASP	RSD	SGS	YAK	EVG	WSP	USP	POR	AAS	CRS	ASP	SHA	POR	ONT; DNQ	PHO			NA	-	
1978	Canavan Racing	01	Dodge	RSD	AAS	S99	SHA	PET	MMR	RSD	IFS	YAK	WSP	LSP	EVG	POR	CRS	ASP	SON	SHA	CBS	YAK	OSS	ONT; DNQ		NA	35	
1978	Canavan Racing	07	Dodge																						PHO; 16	NA	35	
1979		21	Dodge	RSD	MMR	RSD	EVG	YAK	POR	AAS	SHA	CRS	SON	EVG	SRP	POR	ASP	ONT	PHO; 21							NA	30	
1982	Canavan Racing	13	Buick	MMR	S99	AAS	RSD	POR	WSP	SHA	EVG	SON	CDR	RSD	RSD	PHO; 25										NA	26	
1983	Canavan Racing	59	Buick	S99	SON	RSD	YAK	EVG	SHA	RSD	CPL; 18	RSD	PHO													NA	33	
