= Ernie Stierly =

American racing driver (1930–2010)

- Born: November 29, 1930; Montgomery, Pennsylvania, U.S.
- Died: July 3, 2010 (aged 79); Vancouver, Washington, U.S.

NASCAR Cup Series career
- 5 races run over 3 years
- Best finish: 75th (1978)
- First race: 1976 Riverside 400 (Riverside)
- Last race: 1978 NAPA 400 (Riverside)
Wins	Top tens	Poles
0	0	0

ARCA Menards Series West career
- 104 races run over 11 years
- Best finish: 2nd (1976)
- First race: 1965 Portland 150 (Portland)
- Last race: 1979 Kyte Coca-Cola 100 (Portland)
- First win: 1975 Umatilla 100 (Umatilla)
- Last win: 1976 Winston Portland 100 (Portland)
Wins	Top tens	Poles
5	50	7
- Statistics up to date as of May 12, 2026.

Ernest Paul Stierly (November 29, 1930 – July 3, 2010) was an American professional stock car racing driver. He primarily competed in the NASCAR Winston West Series, running over 100 races across 11 seasons.

== Racing career ==
Stierly made his debut in the NASCAR Pacific Coast Late Model Division in 1965, driving a self-owned Pontiac at Portland Speedway, where he finished in last due to exhaust issues. He next raced in the series in 1969, scoring a top-ten at Evergreen Speedway and competing in three other races.

Stierly ran eight races in the renamed NASCAR Winston West Series in 1971, scoring two top-ten finishes. Stierly ran nine races in 1972, finishing in the top-ten in seven of them. 1973 saw Stierly run more races and score more top tens, running eleven races and finishing top ten in every race he finished, including a runner-up finish at Portland Speedway, only failing to finish the race at Laguna Seca Raceway.

Stierly ran 22 of 28 races during the 1974 season, scoring his first career pole along with six top-five and eight top-ten results. He would only run seven races in 1975, but would score his first wins in the series, first at Umitalla Speedway, where he led every lap, and then in the following event at Portland Speedway; Stierly failed to finish the other five races. He attempted the Rose Classic, but failed to qualify. Stierly is known to have competed in the NASCAR Winston Northwest Racing Series in 1975, where he finished fifteenth in the standings, but specific results are unknown.

In 1976, Stierly attempted all but one race (the season opener at Riverside International Raceway) and scored three more wins, all in succession, coming at Western Speedway, Umatilla Speedway, and Portland Speedway. Stierly ended the season second in the standings behind Chuck Bown. In contesting a majority of the schedule, he made his NASCAR Winston Cup Series debut at Riverside, finishing 33rd due to transmission issues.

Stierly again ran a majority of the schedule in 1977, scoring three poles and seven top tens across seventeen races. He nearly won the first West Series races at All American Speedway, but was passed with six laps remaining by Sumner McKnight. During the series' inaugural race at Phoenix Raceway, Stierly collided with Chris Monoleos, causing Monoleos to hit the wall and roll multiple times, leading to an hour-long red flag. Stierly finished sixth in the standings. In two Winston Cup starts, he finished twentieth and thirty-fifth at Riverside and Ontario Motor Speedway respectively. Stierly also made his USAC Stock Car Series debut in 1977, finishing twenty-seventh at Ontario due to engine issues. He also made at least one start in the NASCAR Late Model Sportsman National Championship, where he finished sixth at Riverside.

Stierly would only run half of the West schedule in 1978, scoring a pole and four top-tens, including two fourth place finishes. His final Cup starts and final cup attempt also came during this season, with finishes of nineteenth and 31st in the races at Riverside. He also made his second and final USAC Stock Car start, finishing eleventh at Ontario. He competed in at least one NASCAR Winston Northwest Racing Series event, finishing fourth at Yakima Speedway. He also competed in the Rose Classic at All American Speedway, finishing fifth.

Stierly made his final career West starts in 1979, failing to finish the first two and ending his career with a twentieth place finish at Portland.

== Personal life ==
Stierly was born in Montgomery, Pennsylvania, on November 29, 1930, although it has also been noted as being in December. He owned Allied Plating Inc, a bumper chroming business in Portland, Oregon from 1956 to 1984. The company appeared as a sponsor on his racecar throughout much of his career. He retired and moved to Tillamook, Oregon until having a heart attack in 2006, when he would subsequently move to his prior residence of Vancouver, Washington. Stierly was married to Phyllis Jean Myers Stierly from 1959 until her death in 1993, and had four children. Stierly died in Vancouver on July 3, 2010, at the age of 79.

== Motorsports career results ==
=== NASCAR ===
(key) (Bold – Pole position awarded by qualifying time. Italics – Pole position earned by points standings or practice time. * – Most laps led.)

==== Winston Cup Series ====
NASCAR Winston Cup Series results
Year	Team	No.	Make	1	2	3	4	5	6	7	8	9	10	11	12	13	14	15	16	17	18	19	20	21	22	23	24	25	26	27	28	29	30	NWCSC	Pts	Ref
1976	Ernie Stierly	41	Chevy	RSD	DAY	CAR	RCH	BRI	ATL	NWS	DAR	MAR	TAL	NSV	DOV	CLT	RSD; 33	MCH	DAY	NSV	POC	TAL	MCH	BRI	DAR	RCH	DOV	MAR	NWS	CLT	CAR	ATL	ONT; DNQ	108th	64th	
1977	Ernie Stierly	41	Chevy	RSD; DNQ	DAY	RCH	CAR	ATL	NWS	DAR	BRI	MAR	TAL	NSV	DOV	CLT	RSD; 20	MCH	DAY	NSV	POC	TAL	MCH	BRI	DAR	RCH	DOV	MAR	NWS	CLT	CAR	ATL	ONT; 35	82nd	161	
1978	Ernie Stierly	41	Chevy	RSD; 19	DAY	RCH	CAR	ATL	BRI	DAR	NWS	MAR	TAL	DOV	CLT	NSV	RSD; 31	MCH	DAY	NSV	POC	TAL	MCH	BRI	DAR	RCH	DOV	MAR	NWS	CLT	CAR	ATL	ONT; DNQ	75th	176	

==== Winston West Series ====
NASCAR Winston West Series results
Year	Team	No.	Make	1	2	3	4	5	6	7	8	9	10	11	12	13	14	15	16	17	18	19	20	21	22	23	24	25	26	27	28	29	30	NWWSC	Pts	Ref
1965	Stierly Racing	41	Pontiac	BRS	RSD	SJS	ASP	POR	EVG	BRS	POR; 17	ASP	POR	ASP	ASP	CSF	ASP																	NA	NA	
1969	Unknown	NA	Chevy	RSD	CSF	SGV	SON	EVG; 6	TCR	YAK																								NA	NA	
1969	Stierly Racing	41	Chevy								DCS; 15	SAL; 21	JBA; 14	OSS	SGS	SON	YAK	EVG	CPR	POR	SMS	SGV	TWS											NA	NA	
1971	Stierly Racing	41	Chevy	RSD	ONT	OSS	SJS	CRS	S99	ASP	RSD	SAL; 15	SPS; 6	SKA	USP; 12	POR; 13	LSP	MED; 12	DCS; 13	CRS	OSS	SGS	BKS	CSP	EVG	IFS; 13	YAK; 6	SGB	TWS					27th	318	
1972	Stierly Racing	41	Chevy	RSD	ONT	SJS	S99	SMN	TCR; 8	YAK; 11			MED; 10	POR	IFS; 7	MER; 9	SPS	LSP	WSP	SKA	RAS	CRS	OSS	SGS	CSP	BKS	EVG; 6	USP	YAK; 7	POR; 13	ASP	WCR	SMN	21st	706	
1972	Stierly Racing	41	Mercury								EVG; 10	RSD																						21st	706	
1973	Stierly Racing	41	Chevy	AMP	MAD	S99	AUR; 3	KFS; 7	CBS; 4	USP; 7	POR; 2	SPS; 9	WER	SGS	CAJ	OSS	CSP	BKS	LAG; 28	EVG; 6	WSP; 8	YAK; 6	POR	AMP; 5										17th	801	
1974	Stierly Racing	41	Chevy	RSD	AMP; 19	S99; 11	**MSP**; 5	COR; 11	SBP; 16	ASP; 10	RSD	WER; 22	WSP; 2	SPS; 19	STA; 3	USP; 2	POR; 8	MED; 17	EUG; 19	CBS	CAJ; 4*	CRS; 15	ASP; 22	AMP; 15	CSP	EVG; 20	YAK; 4	POR; 13	SGB; 21	ASP	ONT			10th	1387.25	
1975	Stierly Racing	41	Chevy	RSD	LAG; 24	MSP	ASP	RSD	ASP	**USP**; 1*	POR; 1*	EVG; 21	SMS	CRS	CSP	ASP	EVG; 21	YAK; 18	POR; 11	MSP	ONT													16th	418	
1976	Stierly Racing	41	Chevy	RSD	RSD; 33	EVG; 10	WSP; 1*	USP; 1*	**POR**; 1*	SHA; 3	SGS; 7	EVG; 15	YAK; 3	POR; 4*	LAG; 6	ONT; DNQ																		2nd	827	
1977	Stierly Racing	41	Chevy	RSD	LAG; 16	ONT; 12	SJS; 4	MMR; 8	ASP; 11	RSD; 20	SGS; 7	YAK; 3	EVG; 18	WSP; 16*	USP; 16	POR; 7	**AAS**; 4*	CRS	ASP	**SHA**; 2	POR; 21	ONT; 35	PHO; 26											6th	1112.5	
1978	Stierly Racing	41	Chevy	RSD; 19	AAS; 4	S99; 20	SHA; 18	PET; 15	MMR	RSD; 31	IFS	YAK								SHA; 13	CBS	YAK	OSS	ONT; DNQ	PHO; 11									16th	336	
1978	George Stuart	15	Chevy										**WSP**; 4*																					16th	336	
1978	George Stuart	45	Chevy											LSP; 7	EVG	POR; 9	CRS	ASP	SON															16th	336	
1979	Stierly Racing	41	Chevy	RSD	MMR	RSD	EVG; 22	YAK; 17	POR; 20	AAS	SHA	CRS	SON	EVG	SPO	POR	ASP	ONT	PHO															NA	94	
