= 1976 NASCAR Winston West Series =

23rd season of the NASCAR Winston West Series

Seasons
- ← 1975 1977 →

The 1976 NASCAR Winston West Series was the 23rd season of the series. The title was won by Chuck Bown, his first in the series. It was the first season since 1967 where Ray Elder was not voted Most Popular Driver, the six time champion only showing up to the combination races.

== Schedule and results ==
The 1976 season included 13 individual races, although Riverside International Raceway, Evergreen Speedway, and Portland Speedway hosted two races each. The races at Riverside and the finale at Ontario Motor Speedway were in combination with the NASCAR Winston Cup Series.

| Date | Name | Racetrack | Location | Winner |
|---|---|---|---|---|
| January 18 | Winston Western 500 | Riverside International Raceway | Riverside, California | David Pearson |
| June 13 | Riverside 400 | Riverside International Raceway | Riverside, California | David Pearson |
| June 27 | Winston Evergreen 150 | Evergreen Speedway | Monroe, Washington | Chuck Bown |
| June 30 | Winston Victoria 100 | Western Speedway | Victoria, British Columbia | Ernie Stierly |
| July 3 | Winston Umatilla 100 | Umatilla Speedway | Hermiston, Oregon | Ernie Stierly |
| July 4 | Winston Portland 100 | Portland Speedway | Portland, Oregon | Ernie Stierly |
| July 10 | Winston Shasta 100 | Shasta Speedway | Anderson, California | Bill Schmitt |
| July 24 | Winston Saugus 100 | Saugus Speedway | Saugus, California | Jim Thirkettle |
| September 6 | Winston Evergreen 200 | Evergreen Speedway | Monroe, Washington | Neal Newberry |
| September 11 | Winston Yakima 100 | Yakima Speedway | Yakima, Washington | Harry Jefferson |
| September 12 | Winston Portland 150 | Portland Speedway | Portland, Oregon | Harry Jefferson |
| October 3 | Winston Monterey 100 | Laguna Seca Raceway | Monterey, California | Gary Johnson |
| November 21 | Los Angeles Times 500 | Ontario Motor Speedway | Ontario, California | David Pearson |

== Full Drivers' Championship ==
(key) Bold – Pole position awarded by time. Italics – Pole position set by owner's points. * – Most laps led. † – Ineligible for West Series points

| Pos | Driver | RSD | RSD | EVG | WSP | USP | POR | SHA | SGS | EVG | YAK | POR | LAG | ONT | Pts |
|---|---|---|---|---|---|---|---|---|---|---|---|---|---|---|---|
| 1 | Chuck Bown | 16 | 19 | 1* | 2 | **2** | 4 | 5 | 2 | 2 | **5** | 5 | 5 | 19 | 937.25 |
| 2 | Ernie Stierly | | 33 | 10 | 1* | 1* | **1*** | 3 | 7 | 15 | 3 | 4* | 6 | DNQ | 827 |
| 3 | Gary Johnson | 29 | | 3 | 12 | 5 | 6 | 2 | **4** | 20 | 8 | **15** | **1*** | DNQ | 813 |
| 4 | Chuck Wahl | 22 | 13 | 13 | 3 | 11 | 3 | 4 | 14 | 24 | 18 | 9 | 3 | DNQ | 752.5 |
| 5 | Richard White | | | 14 | 8 | 7 | 7 | 9 | 5 | 19 | 7 | 10 | 4 | DNQ | 738 |
| 6 | Sumner McKnight | | | **6** | 6 | 6 | 10 | 8 | 13 | 7 | 14 | 25 | 9 | DNQ | 722 |
| 7 | Glenn Francis | | | 11 | 9 | 13 | 14 | 6 | 10 | 13 | 9 | 18 | 21 | 28 | 716 |
| 8 | Ron Gautsche | | | 9 | 5 | 12 | 13 | 10 | 11 | 10 | 11 | 23 | 7 | | 653.5 |
| 9 | Bill Schmitt | 10 | | | | 14 | 2 | **1*** | 12 | 17 | | 2 | 15 | 26 | 592.75 |
| 10 | Johnny Kieper | | | 7 | | 3 | 5 | | | 6 | | 22 | 2 | 35 | 506 |
| 11 | Ross Kusah | | | 5 | | 4 | 8 | | | | 4 | 7 | 19 | DNQ | 446.25 |
| 12 | John Hamson | | 32 | | | | | | 9 | 12 | 15 | 12 | 8 | DNQ | 426.75 |
| 13 | Don Puskarich | 27 | 21 | | | | | | 16 | 5 | 16 | 13 | 25 | 15 | 424.75 |
| 14 | Harry Jefferson | 35 | | 17 | | | | | | 4 | 1* | 1 | | DNQ | 360.25 |
| 15 | Neal Newberry | | | 2 | | | | | | **1*** | 2 | 8 | | | 351 |
| 16 | Ron Eaton | | | 4 | 11 | | 16 | | | 23 | | 3 | | | 295 |
| 17 | John Soares Jr. | | | | | | | | 19 | 18 | 6 | 20 | 23 | | 277.25 |
| 18 | Marv Acton | | | 18 | | | | | 17 | 21 | 12 | 11 | | | 261.5 |
| 19 | Terry Wood | | | 16 | 10 | 10 | 15 | | | | | | | DNQ | 260.75 |
| 20 | Phil Goulet | | | 15 | | 8 | 9 | | | | | 16 | | | 259.5 |
| 21 | Roy Smith | | 27 | 8 | **4** | | | | | | | | | 38 | 226 |
| 22 | Chris Monoleos | | | | | | | | | | 19 | 19 | 13 | DNQ | 185 |
| 23 | Pete Torres | | | | | | | | | 22 | 21 | 24 | 20 | | 173 |
| 24 | Jimmy Insolo | 3 | 8 | | | | | | 8* | | | | | 21 | 166.75 |
| 25 | Jim Thirkettle | | 34 | | | | | | 1 | | | | | 29 | 161 |
| 26 | John Weibel | | | | | | | | 18 | | | | 16 | DNQ | 151 |
| 27 | Sonny Easley | 32 | | | | | | 11 | | | | | | 14 | 149.75 |
| 28 | John Dineen | | 22 | | | | | | 6 | | | | | DNQ | 144 |
| 29 | Don Waterman | | | | | 9 | 11 | | | | | | | | 129.75 |
| 30 | Ed Rains | | | | | | | | | 11 | 13 | 17 | | | 129.5 |
| 31 | Jim Thompson | | | 12 | | | 12 | | | 9 | 10 | | | | 129 |
| 32 | Ray Elder | 4 | 4 | | | | | | | | | | | DNQ | 126 |
| 33 | Bill Polich | 26 | 17 | 19 | | | | | | | | | | | 118.25 |
| 34 | Hugh Pearson | 24 | 30 | | | | | | | | | | 22 | DNQ | 118.25 |
| 35 | Dennis Wilson | | | | | | | | | | | | 10 | DNQ | 116 |
| | Ross Surgenor | | | | | | | | | 8 | | | | | 90.75 |
| | Gary Beecroft | | | | | | | | | | | | 11 | | 78.25 |
| | Don Graham | | | | | | | | | | | | 12 | DNQ | 77.25 |
| | Vince Giamformaggio | | | | | | | | 3 | | | | | | 73 |
| | Janet Guthrie | | | | | | | | | | | 14 | | 20† | 73 |
| | Dick Whalen | | | | | | | | | | | | 14 | DNQ | 71.5 |
| | Carl Joiner | 20 | | | | | | | | | | | | 31 | 70 |
| | Terry Forsythe | | | | 7 | | | | | | | | | | 68.5 |
| | Jim Boyd | | | | | | | 7 | | | | | | | 68.25 |
| | Harry Goularte | | | | | | | | | | | | 17 | | 62.5 |
| | Alan Goldstein | | | | | | | | | | | | 18 | | 56.25 |
| | Jerry Barnett | | | | | | | | 15 | | | | | DNQ | 51 |
| | Nick deCourville | | | | | | | | | | | | 24 | | 29.25 |
| | Steve Pfeifer | | | | | | | | | | | | 26 | DNQ | 25.75 |
| | Jackie Kuper | | | | | | | | | 3 | 17 | 6 | | | |
| | Herb Price | | | | | | | | | 16 | 20 | 21 | | | |
| | Eddie Bradshaw | 18 | 15 | | | | | | | | | | | DNQ | |
| | Gary Matthews | 17 | 23 | | | | | | | | | | | | |
| | Ron Esau | 14 | 35 | | | | | | | | | | | DNQ | |
| | Hershel McGriff | 30 | | | | | | | | | | | | 32 | |
| | Doug Presley | | | | | | | 12 | | | | | | | |
| | Larry Esau | 13 | | | | | | | | | | | | | |
| | Dan Joiner | | | | | | | 13 | | | | | | | |
| | Larry Phillips | | | | | | | | | | | | | 13 | |
| | Carl Booker | | | | | | | 14 | | | | | | | |
| | Roger Steres | | | | | | | | | 14 | | | | | |
| | Dave Turfman | | | | | | | 15 | | | | | | | |
| | Don Reynolds | | 18 | | | | | | | | | | | DNQ | |
| | J. C. Danielsen | | 28 | | | | | | | | | | | | |
| | Rusty Sanders | | 31 | | | | | | | | | | | | |
| | Johnny Ray | 31 | | | | | | | | | | | | | |
| | Sam Beler | 34 | | | | | | | | | | | | | |
| | Earle Canavan | | | | | | | | | | | | | DNQ | |
| | Doc Faustina | | | | | | | | | | | | | DNQ | |
| | Dean Dalton | | | | | | | | | | | | | DNQ | |
| | Leon Fox | | | | | | | | | | | | | DNQ | |
| | Coo Coo Marlin | | | | | | | | | | | | | DNQ | |
| | Bryce Mann | | | | | | | | | | | | | DNQ | |
| | Sue Williams | | | | | | | | | | | | | DNQ | |
| | Walter Ballard | | | | | | | | | | | | | DNQ | |
| | Bruce Jacobi | | | | | | | | | | | | | DNQ | |
| | Arlene Hiss | | | | | | | | | | | | | DNQ | |
| | Marty Robbins | | | | | | | | | | | | | DNQ | |
| | Travis Tiller | | | | | | | | | | | | | DNQ | |
| | Jimmy Means | | | | | | | | | | | | | DNQ | |
| | Tom Williams | | | | | | | | | | | | | DNQ | |
| | Jack Simpson | | | | | | | | | | | | | DNQ | |
| | Buddy Arrington | | | | | | | | | | | | | DNQ | |
| | Norm Palmer | | | | | | | | | | | | | DNQ | |
| | Bill Osborne | | | | | | | | | | | | | DNQ | |
| | Perry Cottingham | | | | | | | | | | | | | DNQ | |

== See also ==
- 1976 NASCAR Winston Cup Series
