= 1977 NASCAR Winston West Series =

24th season of the NASCAR Winston West Series

Seasons
- ← 1976 1978 →

The 1977 NASCAR Winston West Series was the 24th season of the series. The title was won by Bill Schmitt, his first in the series.

== Schedule and results ==
The 1977 season included 20 individual races, although Riverside International Raceway, Ontario Motor Speedway, Ascot Park, and Portland Speedway hosted two races each. The races at Riverside and the second Ontario race were in combination with the NASCAR Winston Cup Series. The series raced at Phoenix International Raceway for the first time, with Cale Yarborough winning the race.

Date	Name	Racetrack	Location	Winner
January 16	Winston Western 500	Riverside International Raceway	Riverside, California	David Pearson
May 1	Winston Monterey 100	Laguna Seca Raceway	Monterey, California	Bill Schmitt
May 15	Winston Ontario 250	Ontario Motor Speedway	Ontario, California	Gary Johnson
May 21	Winston Miracle Mile Casino 100	San Jose Speedway	San Jose, California	Chuck Bown
May 28	Winston Mesa Marin 100	Mesa Marin Raceway	Bakersfield, California	Jim Reich
May 30	Winston Gardena 150	Ascot Park	Gardena, California	Vic Irvan
June 12	NAPA 400	Riverside International Raceway	Riverside, California	Richard Petty
June 18	Winston Saugus 100	Saugus Speedway	Saugus, California	Jim Thirkettle
June 25	Winston Yakima 100	Yakima Speedway	Yakima, Washington	Harry Jefferson
June 26	Winston Evergreen 150	Evergreen Speedway	Monroe, Washington	Harry Jefferson
June 29	Winston Victoria 100	Western Speedway	Victoria, British Columbia	George Stuart
July 2	Winston Umatilla 100	Umatilla Speedway	Hermiston, Oregon	Bill Schmitt
July 4	Winston Portland 100	Portland Speedway	Portland, Oregon	Chuck Bown
July 17	Winston Roseville 100	All American Speedway	Roseville, California	Sumner McKnight
August 6	Winston Las Vegas 100	Craig Road Speedway	North Las Vegas, Nevada	Bill Schmitt
August 7	Winston Ascot 100	Ascot Park	Gardena, California	Sonny Easley
August 27	Winston Shasta 100	Shasta Speedway	Anderson, California	Jim Walker
September 11	Winston Portland 150	Portland Speedway	Portland, Oregon	Art Roth
November 20	Los Angeles Times 500	Ontario Motor Speedway	Ontario, California	Neil Bonnett
November 27	Winston West Inaugural Phoenix 250	Phoenix International Raceway	Avondale, Arizona	Cale Yarborough

== Full Drivers Championship ==
(key) Bold – Pole position awarded by time. Italics – Pole position set by owner's points. * – Most laps led. † – Ineligible for West Series points

Pos	Driver	RSD	LAG	ONT	SJS	MMR	ASP	RSD	SGS	YAK	EVG	WSP	USP	POR	AAS	CRS	ASP	SHA	POR	ONT	PHO	Pts
1	Bill Schmitt	19	1	2	2	5	14	30	3	20	5	**3**	1*	**3**	5	1*	6	8	4	41	5	1526.5
2	Chuck Bown	13	18*	**15***	1*	3	5	25	11	**9**	**7**	4	2	1*	3	13	15	9	19	39	4	1415.75
3	Richard White		11	9	6	4	**13**	22	5	15	11	9	8	11	6	3	17	14	17	25	8	1355.25
4	Gary Johnson	20	**3**	1*	7	13	10	29	18	13	16	6	11	17	15	17	9	15	3	DNQ	17	1284.5
5	Pat Mintey		27	10	11	11	2		12	16	17	10	10	14	8	9	11	16	7		12	1214.5
6	Ernie Stierly		16	12	**4**	8	11	20	7	3	18	16	16	7	**4***			**2**	21	35	26	1112.5
7	John Borneman		28	37		6	4		15	17	10	12	7	9	16	10	16	7	6	28	19	991.25
8	Sumner McKnight		26	34	9	22		31	14	12	13	5	3	4	1	5	12	5	10			987.5
9	Bill Baker	28	8	27	15	17		16	8		24	14	15	12	14	**18**	18	3	9	DNQ		835.25
10	Don Graham		10	30		16	19		19	22		11	13		11	6		6	16	30	16	794.25
11	Don Puskarich	30	12	13	13	10	7	28	10							7	10			DNQ	21	764
12	Ron Gautsche		7		12	9	3				20		12	15	7	8	5	11				741.75
13	Hershel McGriff	7	5	4	18	14	15	34		2	2			22								693.25
14	Steve Pfeifer		29	22	20		18					15		19	10	16	23	12	23	DNQ	14	661.5
15	Frank Bigelow				19	20	9		16		25	7			2		7	4	18			559.25
16	Harry Goularte		22	24	17			21			23	13	19	26	12	15				DNQ	22	547
17	J. C. Danielsen		13			19											4	10	5		18	413.25
18	Chuck Wahl	26		5		2		18	2													401.75
19	Marc Vogel		30	25	14	15	8		20		26				13							398.75
20	Harry Jefferson									1*	1*			5					2	18		389
21	Roy Smith	22						23		10	15	2	5	8								358
22	Don Noel			7		24		35	**4***											DNQ		352.75
23	Sonny Easley	5						7									**1***			26	6	351
24	Johnny Kieper		23							7	27		9	10					24	36		337
25	Gary Matthews	24	4	3			22													DNQ		328
26	Vic Irvan		21		8	7	1*										8					300.75
27	John Dineen			36		12		13												DNQ	10	292.75
28	Jim Thirkettle	16		23		21		24	1													287
29	Terry Wood		17	11	16																	273
30	John Hamson		6	17				DNQ														270.75
31	Dennis Wilson		2		5	23											21					256.5
32	Ron Eaton		24							14	21			2								221
33	Rick McCray			19			16		9													217.5
34	Ray Elder							32												DNQ	11	209
35	Jim Reich		25		3	**1***																198.25
36	Pappy Pryor									19	22		17						8		13	189.25
37	Don Pruitt						6														15	185.75
38	Glenn Francis	33	19	35																DNQ	23	174.25
39	John Krebs						12									11	19					174.75
40	Art Roth									4	6		4					3	**1***			170.25
41	Bryce Mann			6																		168.75
42	Glen Steurer			8					6													164.25
43	Leon Fox									5	3											155.75
44	Ron Esau			20																		152.25
45	Jim Walker														9			1*				149.25
46	Tom Haylett						20		17			18		21								148.25
47	George Spink			14																		147
48	Vince Giamformaggio		20	29																33		140.25
49	Jim Haney Jr.			16																		140
50	Cale Yarborough	**2***†						3†												3†	1	138
51	Phil Goulet													16					11			133.75
52	Johnny Steele											17	20	18								133.25
53	Pete Torres			21																	25	132.75
54	John Soares Jr.		15		10										18							132.5
55	Norm Palmer	23						6												34		131
56	Jack Simpson							DNQ									14			DNQ		130
57	Jimmy Insolo	34						4								12	20					129.75
58	Neil Bonnett	17†																		1*†	**2***	127
59	Bobby Allison	35†						17†												7†	3	125.5
60	Bill Osborne			18																23		120.5
61	Ed Ash																				7	120
62	Bobby Fisher																				9	117.5
63	Eddie Bradshaw	10						DNQ												37		109
64	Dan Joiner										14		18	20					22			103.25
65	Hal Callentine																		12		30	95.75
66	Jeff Culver		9																			78.75
67	Rick Becker																3					73
68	Evan Noyes Jr.		14																			70
69	Ross Kusah									18	28	8	6	6								70
70	Dick Whalen																				20	69.5
71	Bob Forester			26																		68.75
72	Ron McGee																			31		66
73	Don Waterman									6	4			25					14			65.5
74	Bob Switzer			32																DNQ	24	64.5
75	Bill Cheesbourg																13					61
76	Don Reynolds			28																		56.75
77	Chris Monoleos																				27	54.5
78	Joe Ruttman																			13		50
79	Rodger Patterson					18																49.75
80	Woody Wodzewoda																	17				48.5
81	Hugh Pearson	8																				48
82	Dave Scheidecker						17															42.75
83	Donnie Allison																	18		42†		39.75
84	Carl Joiner	31																				36
85	John Kennedy																				28	29.5
86	Tom Blair			31																		25
87	Rocky Moran			33																DNQ		19.25
	Jim Robinson								13							2	2					
	George Stuart										9	1*										
	Neal Newberry									11	8											
	Tony Heckart									8	12											
	Jackie Kuper									21				24								
	Jim Sanderson															4						
	Gary Callentine																		13			
	Butch Johnson													13								
	Roy Klein															14						
	J. J. Zaffino												**14**									
	Ron Kusoche																		15			
	Bruce Richardson														17							
	Don Hume										19											
	John Volz														19							
	Luis Matiotta																		20			
	Ben Mellis														20							
	Bobby Goodwin						21															
	Don Simkins																22					
	Cliff Garner						23															
	Chuck Flora													23								
	Wally Lambert																				29	
	Joseph Schultz																			DNQ		
	Dean Dalton																			DNQ		
	Steve Stolarek																			DNQ		
	Earle Canavan																			DNQ		
	Bennie Vaught																			DNQ		
	Jabe Thomas																			DNQ		
	Ron Hutcherson																			DNQ		
	Travis Tiller																			DNQ		
	Mike Brockman																			DNQ		
	Jimmy Means																			DNQ		
	Jocko Maggiacomo																			DNQ		
	Skip Manning							10†												DNQ		
	Ivan Baldwin							DC														

== See also ==
- 1977 NASCAR Winston Cup Series
