= 1975 NASCAR Winston West Series =

22nd season of the NASCAR Winston West Series

Seasons
- ← 1974 1976 →

The 1975 NASCAR Winston West Series was the 22nd season of the series. The title was won by Ray Elder, his sixth in the series and second in a row.

== Schedule and results ==
The 1975 season included 18 individual races, although Ascot Park hosted three races and Manzanita Speedway, Riverside International Raceway, Portland Speedway, and Evergreen Speedway hosted two races each. The races at Riverside and the finale at Ontario Motor Speedway were in combination with the NASCAR Winston Cup Series.

Date	Name	Racetrack	Location	Winner
January 19	Winston Western 500	Riverside International Raceway	Riverside, California	Bobby Allison
May 4	Monterey Triple Crown	Laguna Seca Raceway	Monterey, California	Chuck Wahl
May 10	Manzanita 100	Manzanita Speedway	Phoenix, Arizona	Bill Cheesbourg
May 26	Memorial 100	Ascot Park	Gardena, California	Sonny Easley
June 8	Tuborg 400	Riverside International Raceway	Riverside, California	Richard Petty
June 27	Gardena 100	Ascot Park	Gardena, California	Ray Elder
July 3	Umatilla 100	Umatilla Speedway	Hermiston, Oregon	Ernie Stierly
July 4	Coca-Cola 100	Portland Speedway	Portland, Oregon	Ernie Stierly
July 6	Evergreen 150	Evergreen Speedway	Monroe, Washington	Ray Elder
July 26	Santa Maria 100	Santa Maria Speedway	Santa Maria, California	Ray Elder
August 1	Las Vegas 100	Craig Road Speedway	North Las Vegas, Nevada	Chuck Wahl
August 22	Clovis 100	Clovis Speedway	Clovis, California	Jimmy Insolo
August 24	L.A. International 100	Ascot Park	Gardena, California	Sonny Easley
August 31	Monroe 200	Evergreen Speedway	Monroe, Washington	Ray Elder
September 6	Yakima 100	Yakima Speedway	Yakima, Washington	Jimmy Insolo
September 7	Coca-Cola 150	Portland Speedway	Portland, Oregon	Bill Schmitt
September 20	Manzanita 150	Manzanita Speedway	Phoenix, Arizona	Ray Elder
November 23	Los Angeles Times 500	Ontario Motor Speedway	Ontario, California	Buddy Baker

== Full Drivers' Championship ==
(key) Bold – Pole position awarded by time. Italics – Pole position set by owner's points. * – Most laps led. † – Ineligible for West Series points

Pos	Driver	RSD	LAG	MSP	ASP	RSD	ASP	USP	POR	EVG	SMS	CRS	CSP	ASP	EVG	YAK	POR	MSP	ONT	Pts
1	Ray Elder	13	4	5	2	4	1	3	2	**1***	1	3	3	14	1*	5	6	1*	25	1327.5
2	Sonny Easley	21	7	11	**1***	30	2	17	23	13	13	7	4	1*	6	2	18	7	39	1142.25
3	Chuck Wahl	17	1	18	17	7	19	5	**4**	2	16	**1***	15	11	9	3	3	10	35	1102.25
4	Don Puskarich	12	21	16	9	32	10	12	15	20	**2**	6	9	9	13	21	15	6	37	1027
5	Dennis Wilson	DNQ	11	9	10	DNQ	13	13	16	18	6	11	13	3	8	14	13	3		1006.75
6	Jim Boyd			4	7	14		4	10	6	4	2	**5**	2	23	4	7	4	27	998.5
7	Jimmy Insolo	33	**2***	2	3	27	**3**	19	8	16	9		1*	16	16	**1***	21		7	988.75
8	Richard White	19	23	**3**	14		12		18	10	12	4	10	5	15	13	14			865.75
9	Bill Schmitt	18	3			8		14	9	12			2	8	18	6	1		33	778
10	Ron Gautsche		8	10	6			10	11			5	6	6	4	11	24			743.25
11	Steve Vaughn		10	8	12		4	15	22	15	5	10	8	**17**				**9**		736.25
12	Johnny Kieper		6			20		2	6	4					11	8	4		24	590.75
13	Ivan Baldwin	35	16	17	4	35	7*	9		5	14*	13						11		582
14	Ted Fritz		9	6	8	33	16	18			7	9	16							509.5
15	Don Hall		19					6	20	8					14	19	19		11	454.75
16	Ernie Stierly		24					**1***	1*	21					21	18	11			418
17	Chuck Bown	27				34			5	3					17		**2**		38	409
18	Hugh Pearson	23	20		16		15				3		7	15					18	404.5
19	Glenn Francis	25	17			11						8	12	13				8		373.25
20	Jim Thompson								13	14					7	10	20			335
21	Rodger Patterson				15		6				8		11	12						296.75
22	John Soares Jr.					31			24	7	10	12	18							289
23	Pete Torres	26	14	19	20	16	20							18						275.75
24	Phil Goulet							11	17	9							12			273.5
25	Larry Dagley			7			9				11							2		269.5
26	Walt Price						5	8	19	11										265
27	Bill Osborne	16	5	15	18	26														257.5
28	Jim Thirkettle														10	9	23		32	236.25
29	Larry Snodderly							20	14							12	10			234
30	Hershel McGriff	10				19									2				31	232.75
31	Chuck Little	28	15					16							12					220.75
32	Ross Kusah							7	3	19							5			199
33	Bill Cheesbourg			1*			18													193.75
34	Ron Stagler												14	7				5		188.5
35	Harry Jefferson	32													3	17				180.5
	John Hamson														19	15	16			173.75
	Don Pruitt				13		8				17									151.5
	Ron Esau	22					14							10						151
	Dick Kranzler						21		21	17										142
	Markey James		12	14																133.5
	Jackie Kuper														**5**	20				132.75
	Jack Simpson				11		11													126.75
	Carl Joiner					22			7											108.5
	Vince Schiro												17	4						106
	Dale Lee			13														12		102.5
	Neal Newberry									23						7				98
	Gary Matthews	8				15														94
	Rusty Gott															16	22			92.75
	Don Reynolds	20										14								81.75
	Bobby Allison	**1***†				**2***†											8*		5†	79.75
	Don Waterman																9			78.5
	Mike Chase				5															70.25
	Bob Kennedy		13																	69.5
	Marion Smiley			12																63.25
	Al Tourond								12											63
	Jim Chamberlain																17			57.5
	Jim McMillan														20					55.25
	Joe Chamberlain		18																	47.25
	Gene Riniker					10														47
	Don Simkins										15									46.75
	Larry Esau	15																		46
	Roy Smith																		29	44
	Arnie Krueger						17													42.75
	Eddie Bradshaw					25														39
	Jerry Oliver		22																	38.75
	Steve McGuire																	13		38.25
	Mike Kord											15								38
	LeRoy Anderson														22					38
	Larry Borman				19															34.5
	Dick Bown	30																		33
	Tracy Stone									22										32
	Dave Scheidecker						22													29.5

== See also ==
- 1975 NASCAR Winston Cup Series
