= Dennis Wilson (racing driver) =

American racing driver (born 1952)

- Born: May 19, 1952 (age 74); Modesto, California, U.S.

NASCAR Cup Series career
- Best finish: 133rd (1975)

ARCA Menards Series career
- 1 race run over 1 year
- Best finish: N/A (1992)
- First race: 1992 Mello Yellow 350k (Topeka)
Wins	Top tens	Poles
0	0	0

ARCA Menards Series West career
- 20 races run over 3 years
- Best finish: 5th (1975)
- First race: 1975 Monterey Triple Crown (Laguna Seca)
- Last race: 1977 Winston Ascot 100 (Gardena)
Wins	Top tens	Poles
0	9	0
- Statistics up to date as of October 26, 2026.

Dennis Wilson (born May 19, 1952) is an American former professional stock car racing and sports car racing driver. He competed in the NASCAR Winston West Series, ARCA SuperCar Series, and IMSA Camel GT Championship.

== Racing career ==
Wilson began competing in the NASCAR Winston West Series in 1975, attempting all but one race during the season; he qualified for fifteen races, scoring six top-tens with a best finish of third at Ascot Park and Manzanita Speedway. He attempted to qualify for the combination races with the NASCAR Winston Cup Series at Riverside International Raceway but failed to make the field both times.

Wilson made just one Winston West start in 1976, finishing tenth at Laguna Seca Raceway; he also failed to qualify for the season finale at Ontario Motor Speedway, a combination race. Wilson also made two starts in the 1976 IMSA Camel GT Championship, competing in the GTU class, where he finished 34th overall and 11th in class at Road Atlanta and 25th overall and ninth in class at the Daytona International Speedway Road Course driving a Triumph TR6.

Wilson made his final Winston West starts in 1977, running four races and scoring two top-tens, both top-fives, including a career-best second place finish at Laguna Seca. He attempted the Winston Cup season opener at Riverside but failed to qualify.

Wilson again ran two IMSA races in the GTU class in 1977, finishing 15th overall and seventh in class at Mid-America Raceways and 18th overall and 15th in class at Hallett Raceway Park again driving the Triumph TR6.

Wilson next competed in IMSA in 1981, driving a BMW M1 in the GTO class, where he finished seventh overall and third in class at Road Atlanta and tenth overall and third in class at Daytona.

Wilson's final IMSA season was 1982, where he ran six total races, all in the GTO class; after failing to finish in the BMW M1 in the 1982 24 Hours of Daytona and at Road Atlanta, Wilson's other four starts came driving a Porsche Carrera, where he scored a best overall finish of 12th at the Mid-Ohio Sports Car Course and a best class finish of fourth at the Charlotte Motor Speedway Road Course and Mid-Ohio.

Wilson is listed as competing in an ARCA SuperCar Series race at Heartland Park Topeka in 1992, finishing 33rd, although this may have been Denny Wilson, a driver born in 1946 who also competed in a Winston Cup race in 1992.
