= Coca-Cola 200 =

There have been multiple NASCAR races named Coca-Cola 200:

- Coca-Cola 200 (Laguna Seca), a NASCAR Winston West Series race held at Laguna Seca Raceway in 1981
- Coca-Cola 200 (Rockingham), a Budweiser Late Model Sportsman Series (now O'Reilly Auto Parts Series) race held at North Carolina Speedway from 1982 to 1983
- Coca-Cola 200 (Greenville), a Budweiser Late Model Sportsman Series race held at Greenville-Pickens Speedway in 1983
- Coca-Cola 200 (South Boston), a Budweiser Late Model Sportsman Series race held at South Boston Speedway in 1983
- Coca-Cola 200 (North Wilkesboro), a Budweiser Late Model Sportsman Series race held at North Wilkesboro Speedway in 1983
- Coca-Cola 200 (Bristol), a NASCAR Craftsman Truck Series race held at Bristol International Raceway in 1996
- Coca-Cola 200 (Iowa), a NASCAR Craftsman Truck Series race held at Iowa Speedway in 2011
