= 1976 Los Angeles Times 500 =

Auto race held at Ontario Motor Speedway in 1976

Race details
- Race 30 of 30 in the 1976 NASCAR Winston Cup Series season
- Official racing program of the 1976 Los Angeles Times 500
- Date: November 21, 1976
- Official name: Los Angeles Times 500
- Location: Ontario Motor Speedway, Ontario, California
- Course: Permanent racing facility
- Course length: 2.500 miles (4.023 km)
- Distance: 200 laps, 500 mi (804 km)
- Weather: Mild with temperatures of 77 °F (25 °C); wind speeds of 8 miles per hour (13 km/h)
- Average speed: 137.101 miles per hour (220.643 km/h)

Pole position
| Driver | David Pearson | Wood Brothers |

Most laps led
| Driver | David Pearson | Wood Brothers |
- Laps: 121

Winner
| No. 21 | David Pearson | Wood Brothers |

Television in the United States
- Network: CBS
- Announcers: Ken Squier; Lee Petty

The 1976 Los Angeles Times 500 was a NASCAR Winston Cup Series race that took place on November 21, 1976, at Ontario Motor Speedway in Ontario, California. Each copy of the souvenir program was $2 ($11.32 when adjusted for inflation).

The five drivers that dominated the 1976 NASCAR Winston Cup Series season were David Pearson (average finish of 7th place), Cale Yarborough (average finish of 8th place), Richard Petty (average finish of 9th place), Benny Parsons (average finish of 10th place), and Bobby Allison (average finish 12th place).

== Background ==
Ontario Motor Speedway was a motorsport venue located in Ontario, California. It was the first and only automobile racing facility built to accommodate major races sanctioned by all of the four dominant racing sanctioning bodies: USAC (and now IndyCar Series) for open-wheel oval car races; NASCAR for a 500-mile (800 km) oval stock car races; NHRA for drag races; and FIA for Formula One road course races. Constructed in less than two years, the track opened in August 1970 and was considered state of the art at the time.

The first full year of racing included the Indy-style open-wheel Inaugural California 500 on September 6, 1970; the Miller High Life 500 stock car race on February 28, 1971, the Super Nationals drag race on November 21, 1970 and the Questor Grand Prix on March 28, 1971. Each of these inaugural races drew attendance second only to their established counterparts, the USAC Indianapolis 500, the NASCAR Daytona 500, the NHRA U.S. Nationals, and the U.S. Formula One race at Watkins Glen.

== Race report ==
There were 40 drivers on the grid; 39 of them were born in the United States of America while Roy Smith was born in Canada. Darrell Waltrip would earn the last-place finish of the race due to an engine issue on lap 10 of 200. A grand total of $155,639 was awarded for this race ($880,589 in when adjusted for inflation); Pearson received $27,715 ($156,809 when adjusted for inflation) while Waltrip won $3,660 ($20,708 when adjusted for inflation).

David Pearson defeated Lennie Pond by one lap in front of 44,702 people; giving Pearson at least one win at each of the 16 tracks in use at that time. Petty lacked only Ontario (where he would never win). There were four lead changes and two cautions for 19 laps in this three-hour-and-thirty-eight-minute race. Pearson would earn the pole position with a top speed of 153.964 miles per hour (247.781 km/h) while the average speed of the race was 137.101 miles per hour (220.643 km/h).

Former IndyCar driver Mike Hiss would make his only NASCAR start here. This race saw the rare occurrence of both a husband and wife being entered in the same NASCAR race looking to race as IndyCar competitors Mike and Arlene Hiss both attempted to qualify for the race. Arlene Hiss failed to qualify although the late Mike Hiss, as mentioned above, did both qualify for and finish the race.

There was a brutal level of attrition due to mechanical problems in this race, even by 1976 standards. Blown engines in addition to transmission failures and clutch failures forced a lot of the star drivers out of the race; allowing a lot of independent drivers to have decent finishes.

Notable crew chiefs for this race included Billy Hagan, Junie Donlavey, Jake Elder, Harry Hyde, Dale Inman, Bud Moore among many others.

=== Qualifying ===
| Grid | No. | Driver | Manufacturer | Owner |
|---|---|---|---|---|
| 1 | 21 | David Pearson | Mercury | Wood Brothers |
| 2 | 71 | Dave Marcis | Dodge | Nord Krauskopf |
| 3 | 11 | Cale Yarborough | Chevrolet | Junior Johnson |
| 4 | 15 | Buddy Baker | Ford | Bud Moore |
| 5 | 2 | Bobby Allison | Mercury | Roger Penske |
| 6 | 88 | Darrell Waltrip | Chevrolet | DiGard Racing |
| 7 | 43 | Richard Petty | Dodge | Petty Enterprises |
| 8 | 28 | Donnie Allison | Chevrolet | Hoss Ellington |
| 9 | 72 | Benny Parsons | Chevrolet | L.G. DeWitt |
| 10 | 67 | Sonny Easley | Ford | Jerry Lankford |
| 11 | 54 | Lennie Pond | Chevrolet | Ronnie Elder |
| 12 | 90 | Dick Brooks | Ford | Junie Donlavey |
| 13 | 01 | Chuck Bown | Chevrolet | Gerald Craker |
| 14 | 81 | Terry Ryan | Chevrolet | Bill Monaghan |
| 15 | 50 | Terry Bivins | Chevrolet | Michael Brockman |

Failed to qualify: Bill Osborne (#94), Hugh Pearson (#76), Buddy Arrington (#67), Tom Williams (#52), Don Graham (#52), Jimmy Means (#52), Travis Tiller (#46), Gary Johnson (#44), Marty Robbins (#42), John Weibel (#80), Sumner McKnight (#82), Jack Simpson (#53), Perry Cottingham (#99), Jerry Barnett (#99), Harry Jefferson (#95), Norm Palmer (#93), Chris Monoleos (#92), Don Reynolds (#89), Dick Whalen (#86), Ernie Stierly (#41), Terry Wood (#39), Arlene Hiss (#38), Coo Coo Marlin (#14), Leon Fox (#10), Eddie Bradshaw (#09), Dean Dalton (#7), Doc Faustina (#5), Ross Kusah (#4), Richard White (#2), Earle Canavan (#01), Dennis Wilson (#16), John Dineen (#18), Bruce Jacobi (#37), Chuck Wahl (#37), Ray Elder (#32), Walter Ballard (#30), Sue Williams (#25), Bryce Mann (#24), John Hamson (#22), Ron Esau (#20), and Steve Pfeifer (#0).

== Top 10 finishers ==
Section reference:

1. David Pearson (No. 21), official time 3:38:49
2. Lennie Pond (No. 54), 1 lap down
3. Benny Parsons (No. 72), 2 laps down
4. Dick Brooks (No. 90), 2 laps down
5. James Hylton (No. 48), 4 laps down
6. Bobby Wawak (No. 36), 4 laps down
7. Terry Bivins (No. 50), 6 laps down
8. Skip Manning (No. 92), 8 laps down
9. Terry Ryan (No. 81), 8 laps down
10. Bruce Hill (No. 47), 8 laps down

== Timeline ==
Section reference:

- Start of race: David Pearson started the race but Cale Yarborough quickly overtook him.
- Lap 10: Darrell Waltrip managed to blow his engine while racing.
- Lap 12: Buddy Baker managed to wreck his vehicle's transmission.
- Lap 23: Roy Smith managed to blow an engine while racing.
- Lap 24: Richard Petty took over the lead from Cale Yarborough.
- Lap 35: Cale Yarborough took over the lead from Richard Petty.
- Lap 48: Henley Gray suffered through some transmission issues with forced him out of the race.
- Lap 54: Richard Childress managed to overheat his vehicle.
- Lap 80: David Pearson took over the lead from Cale Yarborough.
- Lap 111: Carl Joiner, Jr. had a terminal crash, forcing him to exit the race.
- Lap 168: Cale Yarborough had troubles dealing with his vehicle's clutch.
- Lap 171: The battery inside Jimmy Insolo's vehicle no longer worked properly.
- Lap 177: Janet Guthrie experiences problems with her vehicle's hub.
- Lap 178: Chuck Bown managed to blow an engine while racing.
- Finish: David Pearson was officially declared the winner of the event.

== Standings after the race ==
| Pos | Driver | Points | Differential |
|---|---|---|---|
| 1 | Cale Yarborough | 4644 | 0 |
| 2 | Richard Petty | 4449 | -195 |
| 3 | Benny Parsons | 4304 | -340 |
| 4 | Bobby Allison | 4097 | -547 |
| 5 ▲ | Lennie Pond | 3930 | -714 |
| 6 ▼ | Dave Marcis | 3785 | -769 |
| 7 | Buddy Baker | 3745 | -899 |
| 8 | Darrell Waltrip | 3505 | -1139 |
| 9 ▲ | David Pearson | 3483 | -1161 |
| 10 ▲ | Dick Brooks | 3447 | -1197 |

| Preceded by 1976 Dixie 500 | NASCAR Winston Cup Series Season; 1976-77 | Succeeded by 1977 Winston Western 500 |

| Preceded by 1975 | Los Angeles Times 500 races 1976 | Succeeded by 1977 |
