= Marv Acton =

American racing driver (born 1944)

- Born: February 3, 1944 (age 82); Porterville, California, U.S.

NASCAR Cup Series career
- 14 races run over 3 years
- First race: 1971 Daytona 500 (Daytona)
- Last race: 1977 Delaware 500 (Dover)
Wins	Top tens	Poles
0	0	0

ARCA Menards Series West career
- 5 races run over 1 year
- Best finish: 18th (1976)
- First race: 1976 Winston Evergreen 150 (Evergreen)
- Last race: 1976 Winston Portland 150 (Portland)
Wins	Top tens	Poles
0	0	0
- Statistics up to date as of October 29, 2026.

Marvin Oren Acton (born February 3, 1944, in Porterville, California) is an American former stock car racing driver. He made fourteen NASCAR Winston Cup Series starts and five NASCAR Winston West Series starts in his career. He had a best finish of eleventh place. Among the racing Acton did before NASCAR was racing stock cars at Kearney Bowl Speedway in Fresno, California and midgets in Southern California.

== Winston Cup Series career ==
Acton made his NASCAR Winston Cup Series debut in 1971, running 11 races for fellow Porterville, California, driver Dick Brooks. His first start came in the Daytona 500, where he finished 18th after an 11th place start. In 11 starts in 1971, Acton never cracked the top-ten, but had a best finish of 11th at Greenville-Pickens Speedway and a pair of 12ths. He also started in the top-ten three times, the best being a seventh at Greenville-Pickens.

Acton did not race in the series again until 1974, when he made one start at North Wilkesboro Speedway in a self-owned car. He started 29th in the 30 field, but finished 26th after engine troubles.

Acton made two starts in his final season, 1977, both for Rod Osterlund. He was 23rd at Richmond International Raceway and 38th at Dover International Speedway.

== Racing career results ==
=== Winston Cup Series ===
NASCAR Winston Cup Series results
Year	Team/Owner	No.	Manufacturer	1	2	3	4	5	6	7	8	9	10	11	12	13	14	15	16	17	18	19	20	21	22	23	24	25	26	27	28	29	30	31	32	33	34	35	36	37	38	39	40	41	42	43	44	45	46	47	48	NWCC	Pts	Ref
1971	Brooks Racing	40	Plymouth		DAY 18		DAY 19	ONT 12		ROC 32																																										44th	627	
1971	Brooks Racing	32	Plymouth											COL 16	GRE 25														GRE 11										MCH 12	TAL 30	COL 29		DAR 27									44th	627	
1974	Acton Racing	91	Chevrolet								NWI 26																																									N/A	N/A	
1977	Osterlund Motorsports	98	Chevrolet																							RCH 23	DOV 38																									92nd	94	

== Present day ==
Acton owns and operates Action Engineering in Denver, NC. He primarily restores classic hot rods, builds NASCAR show car racing simulators, and has a complete fabrication shop.
