= John Dineen =

Australian rules footballer (1935–2025)

Personal information
- Full name: John Patrick Dineen
- Born: 21 December 1935
- Died: 22 January 2025 (aged 89)
- Original team: Cora Lynn
- Height: 178 cm (5 ft 10 in)
- Weight: 80 kg (176 lb)

Playing career^{1}
Years	Club	Games (Goals)
1958–60	Hawthorn	17 (9)
- ^{1} Playing statistics correct to the end of 1960.

John Patrick Dineen (21 December 1935 – 22 January 2025) was an Australian rules footballer who played with Hawthorn in the Victorian Football League (VFL). Dineen died on 22 January 2025, at the age of 89.
