= Sonny Easley =

American racing driver (1939–1978)

- Born: June 5, 1939; Virginia, U.S.
- Died: January 15, 1978 (aged 38); Van Nuys, California, U.S.
- Cause of death: Accident (Modified practice)
- Awards: West Coast Stock Car Hall of Fame (2003); Saugus Speedway track champion

NASCAR Cup Series career
- 19 races run over 6 years
- Best finish: 38th (1976)
- First race: 1972 Golden State 400 (Riverside)
- Last race: 1977 Los Angeles Times 500 (Ontario)
| Wins | Top tens | Poles |
|---|---|---|
| 0 | 5 | 0 |

ARCA Menards Series West career
- 101 races run over 6 years
- Best finish: 2nd (1973, 1975)
- First race: 1972 Stockton 150 (Stockton)
- Last race: 1977 Winston West Inaugural Phoenix 250 (Phoenix)
- First win: 1973 Tuborg Classic (Laguna Seca)
- Last win: 1977 Winston Ascot 100 (Gardena)
| Wins | Top tens | Poles |
|---|---|---|
| 8 | 64 | 8 |
- Statistics up to date as of October 18, 2026.

Lynwood Lacey "Sonny" Easley (June 5, 1939 – January 15, 1978) was an American stock car racing driver who is best known for competing in the NASCAR Winston West Series and a handful of NASCAR Winston Cup Series events.

Easley tallied nine Winston West victories over his career, including a victory in the first stock car race ever held at the Laguna Seca Raceway road course. He finished second in Winston West points in 1973 and 1975.

In 19 career Cup starts, Easley had a best finish of fifth place at the January 16, 1977 Winston Western 500 at Riverside International Raceway.

During practice for a NASCAR Grand American race at Riverside on January 15, 1978, Easley was killed when his 1968 Camaro slid across the track into a trailer and pickup truck near pit road. A pit crew member for Tiny Keith, Douglas Grunst, was also killed in the incident.

Easley lived in Van Nuys, California.

Easley was a 2003 inductee into the West Coast Stock Car Hall of Fame.
