= West Series races at Laguna Seca =

NASCAR Winston West Series at Mazda Raceway Laguna Seca

NASCAR Winston West races at Laguna Seca

NASCAR Winston West Series
- Venue: Laguna Seca
- Location: Monterey, California, United States
- First race: 1973
- Last race: 2001
- Distance: 100.7 mi (162.061 km) (1975–1977); 125.4 mi (201.812 km) (1980–1981); 150.1 mi (241.563 km) (1973); 154.422 mi (248.518 km) (2000–2001)
- Laps: 53 (1975–1977); 66 (1980–1981); 69 (2000–2001); 79 (1973)
- Previous names: Tuborg Classic 150 (1973); Monterey Triple Crown (1975); Winston Monterey 100 (1976–1977); Winston Monterey 200 (1980); Coca-Cola 200 (1981); Salinas 250 (2000); NASCAR Challenge Salinas 250 (2001)
- Most wins (driver): Eight drivers (1)
- Most wins (team): Eight teams (1)
- Most wins (manufacturer): Chevrolet (4)

The NASCAR Winston West Series held several races at Mazda Raceway Laguna Seca in Monterey, California. The track hosted the series eight times between 1973 and 2001. The race was run on the 1.900 mile original layout in 1973, 1975–1977, and 1980–1981, and the 2.238 mile Grand Prix Circuit in 2000 and 2001.

== History ==
The West Series first visited Laguna Seca in 1973, when Sonny Easley scored the win driving a 1973 Ford. The race returned from 1975 and was held in 1976 and 1977, then in 1980 and 1981. The track was reconfigured from a 9-turn, 1.900 mile circuit to an 11-turn, 2.214 mile circuit in 1988, and was reconfigured again in 1996 to be 2.238 miles, the configuration the series ran when it returned for its final races to date at the then Mazda Raceway Laguna Seca in 2000 and 2001.

== Past winners ==
Year	Date	No.	Driver	Team	Manufacturer	Race Distance		Race Time	Average Speed (mph)	Report	Ref
Year	Date	No.	Driver	Team	Manufacturer	Laps	Miles (km)	Race Time	Average Speed (mph)	Report	Ref
1973	August 26	68	Sonny Easley	Jerry Lankford	Ford	79	150.1 (241.56)	1:57:11	76.802	Report	
1974	Not held										
1975	May 4	37	Chuck Wahl	Joe Marsik	Chevrolet	53	100.7 (162.06)	1:19:40	75.841	Report	
1976	October 3	44	Gary Johnson	Al Clark	Chevrolet (2)	53	100.7 (162.06)	1:12:04	83.839	Report	
1977	May 1	73	Bill Schmitt	Schmitt Motorsports	Chevrolet (3)	53	100.7 (162.06)	1:10:16	85.970	Report	
1978 - 1979	Not held										
1980	June 22	9	Jimmy Insolo	Williamson Racing	Oldsmobile	66	125.4 (201.81)	1:22:33	91.137	Report	
1981	June 28	11	Roy Smith	Robert Beadle	Buick	66	125.4 (201.81)	1:31:08	82.590	Report	
1982 - 1999	Not held										
2000	May 21	18	Bobby Dotter	Green Light Racing	Chevrolet (4)	69	154.42 (248.52)	2:21:37	65.425	Report	
2001	May 20	39	C. T. Hellmund	Hellmund Racing	Pontiac	69	154.42 (248.52)	2:10:03	71.244	Report	

=== Manufacturer wins ===
# Wins	Make	Years won
4	(United States) Chevrolet	1975, 1975, 1977, 200
1	(United States) Buick	1981
1	(United States) Ford	1973
1	(United States) Oldsmobile	1980
1	(United States) Pontiac	2001
