= Santa Maria Speedway =

- Location: 1900 Hutton Road, Nipomo, California
- Coordinates: 35.0026°N 120.4419°W
- Opened: 1964
- Major events: IMCA; USAC; CRA; High Limit Racing; NASCAR Winston West Series (formerly); World of Outlaws (1981–2021)
- Surface: dirt
- Length: 0.333 mi (0.536 km)
- Turns: 4

Santa Maria Speedway is a motorsports facility located in Nipomo, California. The track, a dirt oval short track, has for decades been a regular host of sprint car races in several series. It also has a history of stock car races.

== Description ==
A short track, Santa Maria Speedway is a high-banked, 0.333 miles (0.536 km) dirt surfaced oval. It is considered to be in a scenic location, built into the side of a mountain near to the Pacific Ocean. The track was originally 0.25 miles (0.40 km) when it opened.

== History ==
Opened on May 30, 1964, the Santa Maria Speedway was constructed and long operated by Doug Foot, an electrical and plumbing business owner. Doug and his wife, Nettie, long ran the track. In his decades of promoting races held at the track, Foot received national racing industry accolades.

Stock car racing was a significant form of racing at the track in its early history. Several NASCAR-sanctioned races were held at the track in the 1970s.

The opening event at the track was a sprint car race sanctioned by the California Racing Association. By the 1980s, sprint car racing had become the more prominent form of racing held at the track. Many World of Outlaws races held there. World of Outlaws first raced at the track in 1981, and by 2000 had held 17 races at the track. World of Outlaws had most-recently planned to race at the track in 2020 and 2021, but canceled these races due to the COVID-19 pandemic.

In more recent decades, many wingless sprint car races have been held at the track, including races sponsored by United States Auto Club (USAC) and Champion Racing Association (CRA).

In 2021, it was announced that the track would close. Increased expenses and complaints from neighbors being cited. The race closed in November 2022. In May 2024, the track re-opened under the new ownership of David Castaneda, the track's former general manager. Races that have been held at the track since reopening include ones sanctioned by International Motor Contest Association (IMCA), High Limit Racing, West Coast ProStocks, and Hobby Stocks.
