= 1976 Riverside 400 =

Auto race held at Riverside International Raceway in 1976

Race details
- Race 15 of 28 in the 1976 NASCAR Winston Cup Series season
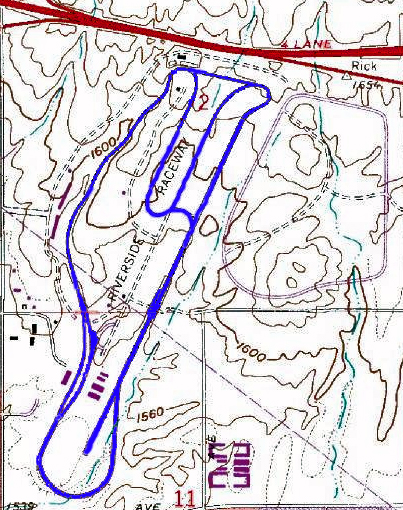
- Layout of Riverside International Raceway (1969-1988 version)
- Date: June 13, 1976
- Official name: Riverside 400
- Location: Riverside International Raceway, Riverside, California
- Course: Permanent racing facility
- Course length: 4.216 km (2.620 miles)
- Distance: 153 laps, 400.9 mi (645.1 km)
- Weather: Very hot with temperatures of 84.9 °F (29.4 °C); wind speeds of 11.8 miles per hour (19.0 km/h)
- Average speed: 106.279 miles per hour (171.039 km/h)

Pole position
Driver	David Pearson	Wood Brothers Racing
- Time: 84.639 seconds

Most laps led
Driver	Cale Yarborough	Junior Johnson & Associates
- Laps: 48

Winner
No. 21	David Pearson	Wood Brothers Racing

Television in the United States
- Network: CBS
- Announcers: Ken Squier; Richard Petty

The 1976 Riverside 400 was a NASCAR Winston Cup Series race that took place on June 13, 1976, at Riverside International Raceway in Riverside, California. The California 150 for sportsman cars was run prior to this race. The winner was Ivan Baldwin followed by Dan Clark and Jim Sanderson.

Most of the vehicles in this event were Chevrolets. Roy Smith was the only Canadian competitor out of the 35-driver grid; the rest of them were American-born.

This was the first Riverside race whose distance was measured in kilometers instead of miles, much shorter than previously but more normal in elapsed time of a typical NASCAR Cup race.

== Background ==
Riverside International Raceway was a race track or road course in Moreno Valley, California. The track was in operation from September 22, 1957, to July 2, 1989. The original course design proved to be dangerous, and it was partially reconfigured in 1969.

== Race report ==
The five drivers that dominated the 1976 NASCAR Winston Cup Series season were David Pearson (average finish of 7th place), Cale Yarborough (average finish of 8th place), Richard Petty (average finish of 9th place), Benny Parsons (average finish of 10th place) and Bobby Allison (average finish 12th place).

Pearson's qualifying speed of 114.437 miles per hour (184.168 km/h) would earn him the pole position while the average speed of the actual race was 106.279 miles per hour (171.039 km/h). Richard Petty would become proficient on turn 6 throughout the race; despite ending the race outside of the "top five."

Junie Donlavey's #90 Truxmore Ford team and driver Dick Brooks missed this race because they were in France competing in the famous 24 Hours of Le Mans the same weekend. The team became the first, and only, Winston Cup team ever to enter the 24-hour classic but Brooks, retired NASCAR racer Dick Hutcherson, and French local Marcel Mignot were sidelined during the first half of the race by a gearbox failure.

Hershel McGriff also missed this race to enter his NASCAR Winston West team at Le Mans partnered with his son Doug McGriff. His Olympia Beer Dodge Charger blew an engine right after the start of the race.

David Pearson managed to defeat Bobby Allison by a time of 1.6 seconds in front of 29,500 people. As a result, Pearson would to sweep the Winston Cup series' two visits to Riverside in 1976. Pearson won three races and seven poles at Riverside but this was the only time he ever won from the pole on the twisty SoCal road course. The race took two hours and twenty minutes to complete; with the event's only caution flag lasting for a duration of four laps. The victor would take home $15,150 in winnings ($83,715 when adjusted for inflation) while last-place paid a meager $665 ($3,675 when adjusted for inflation). Ron Esau would acquire the last-place finish due to a clutch problem on lap 6 out of the 95 that made up the regulation length of the course.

Safe driving habits and remarkable efforts with keeping the oil products away from the track helped to keep most of the race under the green flag.

John Dineen and Ernie Stierly would make their NASCAR Cup Series debut at this racing event. Final NASCAR appearances by Jim Danielson, Bill Polich, and Don Reynolds were also memorable moments from this racing event. Notable crew chiefs on attendance for this race included Richard Elder, Jake Elder, Dale Inman, Travis Carter, Bud Moore and Len Wood.

A little-known fact was that Darrell Waltrip was listed down as a resident of Daytona Beach, Florida for the purpose of tracking the starting grid instead of using his hometown of Owensboro, Kentucky. A race that Waltrip would end up winning later in his career would have him as listed as a resident Franklin, Tennessee - which is located exactly 127 miles (204 km) to the south of Owensboro.

=== Qualifying ===
Grid	No.	Driver	Manufacturer	Speed	Qualifying time	Owner
1	43	Richard Petty	Dodge	111.437	1:24.639	Wood Brothers
2	21	David Pearson	Mercury	110.095	1:25.671	Roger Penske
3	2	Bobby Allison	Mercury	109.895	1:25.827	L.G. DeWitt
4	15	Buddy Baker	Ford	109.575	1:26.078	Bud Moore
5	38	Jimmy Insolo	Chevrolet	109.037	1:26.502	Roger Paquette
6	11	Cale Yarborough	Chevrolet	108.814	1:26.680	Junior Johnson
7	43	Richard Petty	Dodge	108.506	1:26.926	Petty Enterprises
8	50	Rusty Sanders	Chevrolet	108.206	1:27.197	Michael Brockman
9	96	Ray Elder	Dodge	108.099	1:26.253	Fred Elder
10	88	Darrell Waltrip	Chevrolet	107.995	1:27.337	DiGard

== Top 10 finishers ==
Section reference:

1. David Pearson (No. 21)
2. Bobby Allison (No. 2)
3. Benny Parsons (No. 72), 1 lap down
4. Ray Elder (No. 96), 1 lap down
5. Buddy Baker (No. 15), 1 lap down
6. Darrell Waltrip (No. 88), 2 laps down
7. Cale Yarborough (No. 11), 2 laps down
8. Jimmy Insolo (No. 38), 3 laps down
9. Richard Petty (No. 43), 3 laps down
10. Dave Marcis (No. 71), 3 laps down

== Timeline ==
Section reference:

- Start of race: David Pearson had the pole position to begin the race.
- Lap 5: Bobby Allison took over the lead from David Pearson.
- Lap 6: Ron Esau had a hard time handling his vehicle's clutch, forcing him out of the race prematurely.
- Lap 7: Cale Yarborough took over the lead from Bobby Allison.
- Lap 9: Jim Thirkettle's engine stopped working.
- Lap 8: Bobby Allison took over the lead from Cale Yarborough.
- Lap 9: Cale Yarborough took over the lead from Bobby Allison.
- Lap 21: Ernie Stierly's vehicle had transmission issues.
- Lap 26: John Hamson had to leave the race because his vehicle's engine started acting up.
- Lap 29: Rusty Sanders had a terminal crash.
- Lap 31: Bobby Allison took over the lead from Cale Yarborough.
- Lap 32: Hugh Pearson had to leave the race because his vehicle's engine started acting up.
- Lap 35: Cale Yarborough took over the lead from Bobby Allison.
- Lap 36: Neil Bonnett noticed that his vehicle's brakes were acting shoddy.
- Lap 39: Jim Danielson had to leave the race because his vehicle's engine started acting up.
- Lap 54: Oil pressure issues managed to overcome Roy Smith's vehicle.
- Lap 57: D.K. Ulrich had to leave the race because his vehicle's engine started acting up.
- Lap 60: David Pearson took over the lead from Cale Yarborough.
- Lap 70: Oil pump issues forced Lennie Pond to leave the race promptly.
- Lap 71: Gary Matthews lost the rear end of his vehicle, forcing him to exit the race.
- Lap 81: Frank Warren fell out with engine failure while racing at competitive speeds.
- Finish: David Pearson was officially declared the winner of the event.

== Standings after the race ==
Pos	Driver	Points	Differential
1	Benny Parsons	2161	0
2	Cale Yarborough	2138	-23
3	Richard Petty	2036	-125
4	Bobby Allison	1991	-170
5 ▲	Dave Marcis	1827	-334
6 ▼	Lennie Pond	1818	-343
7	Richard Childress	1758	-403
8	Darrell Waltrip	1664	-497
9	Buddy Baker	1663	-498
10	Frank Warren	1583	-578

Preceded by 1976 World 600	NASCAR Winston Cup Season; 1976	Succeeded by 1976 Cam 2 Motor Oil 400
