= 1976 World 600 =

Auto race held at Charlotte Motor Speedway in 1976

Race details
- Race 13 of 30 in the 1976 NASCAR Winston Cup Series season
- Layout of Charlotte Motor Speedway
- Date: May 30, 1976
- Official name: World 600
- Location: Charlotte Motor Speedway, Concord, North Carolina
- Course: Permanent racing facility
- Course length: 1.500 miles (2.414 km)
- Distance: 400 laps, 600 mi (965 km)
- Weather: Warm with temperatures of 79 °F (26 °C); wind speeds of 11.1 miles per hour (17.9 km/h)
- Average speed: 137.352 mph (221.047 km/h)
- Attendance: 103,000

Pole position
Driver	David Pearson	Wood Brothers Racing
- Time: 33.9341 seconds 159.132 mph (256.098 km/h)

Most laps led
Driver	David Pearson	Wood Brothers Racing
- Laps: 230

Winner
No. 21	David Pearson	Wood Brothers Racing

Television in the United States
- Network: CBS
- Announcers: Ken Squier

The 1976 World 600, the 17th running of the event, was a Winston Cup Series racing event that took place on May 30, 1976, at Charlotte Motor Speedway in Concord, North Carolina.

== Race report ==
The five drivers that dominated the 1976 NASCAR Winston Cup Series season were David Pearson (average finish of 7th place), Cale Yarborough (average finish of 8th place), Richard Petty (average finish of 9th place), Benny Parsons (average finish of 10th place), and Bobby Allison (average finish 12th place).

Four hundred laps took place spanning 1.500 miles (2.414 km). It took four hours and twenty-two minutes for David Pearson to defeat Richard Petty under the race's final yellow flag in front of 103,000 spectators.

Pearson would earn the pole position with a speed of 159.132 miles per hour (256.098 km/h) while the race's average speed would be 137.352 miles per hour (221.047 km/h); he would clinch his third career World 600 win at this event along with his final win ever at Charlotte. Dale Earnhardt ran a #30 Army Special Chevrolet scheme at this event. Terry Ryan was the last-place finisher due to a hub problem on lap 11. Wisconsin short track ace Dick Trickle did a one-off in a second car, the #99 Ford, for the Junie Donlavey team, blew an engine and retired before halfway. Seven cautions slowed the race for 38 laps (including the 400th lap of the race).

For the first 245 laps the primary battle was between Pearson and Yarborough as the lead officially changed 33 times in that span and 37 in all. Yarborough cut a tire and finished a lap down in third.

David Pearson's next pole position would be at Riverside International Raceway two weeks later; he would win eight poles overall that year including at the 1976 National 500; which took place that October.

Bobby Isaac blew his engine and spun at Lap 46; it would be his final Winston Cup start. It was ironic that Isaac’s career ended in the World 600, as his debut came fifteen years earlier when, as a favor, he started and parked Junior Johnson's car in the qualifying race for this historic event.

Janet Guthrie would make her debut here. She was invited to attempt this race by Humpy Wheeler after failing to qualify for the 1976 Indianapolis 500. Guthrie finished her first stock car race in 15th place and drove well over 500 miles in the process, silencing some of the era's critics who thought women wouldn't be able to go the distance in long oval races.

Notable crew chiefs who participated in this race included Junie Donlavey, Jake Elder, Harry Hyde, Dale Inman, and Bud Moore.

Race earnings for each driver ranged from the winner's share of $49,990 ($282,838 when adjusted for inflation) to the last-place finisher's earnings of $885 ($5,007 when adjusted for inflation). The total prize purse sanctioned by NASCAR for this event was $225,025 ($1,273,168 when adjusted for inflation).

=== Qualifying ===
Grid	No.	Driver	Manufacturer
1	21	David Pearson	Mercury
2	43	Richard Petty	Dodge
3	11	Cale Yarborough	Chevrolet
4	2	Bobby Allison	Mercury
5	71	Dave Marcis	Dodge
6	15	Buddy Baker	Ford
7	28	Donnie Allison	Chevrolet
8	14	Charlie Glotzbach	Chevrolet
9	88	Darrell Waltrip	Chevrolet
10	90	Dick Brooks	Ford
11	18	Harry Gant	Chevrolet
12	48	James Hylton	Chevrolet
13	54	Lennie Pond	Chevrolet
14	79	Frank Warren	Dodge
15	99	Dick Trickle	Ford
16	72	Benny Parsons	Chevrolet
17	19	Cecil Gordon	Chevrolet
18	3	Richard Childress	Chevrolet
19	47	Bruce Hill	Chevrolet
20	41	Grant Adcox	Chevrolet
21	67	Buddy Arrington	Dodge
22	92	Skip Manning	Chevrolet
23	27	Sam Sommers	Chevrolet
24	60	Jackie Rogers	Chevrolet
25	30	Dale Earnhardt	Chevrolet
26	9	Bill Elliott	Ford
27	68	Janet Guthrie	Chevrolet
28	8	Ed Negre	Dodge
29	70	J.D. McDuffie	Chevrolet
30	50	Darrell Bryant	Chevrolet
31	81	Terry Ryan	Chevrolet
32	05	David Sisco	Chevrolet
33	26	Bobby Wawak	Chevrolet
34	6	Bobby Isaac	Chevrolet
35	52	Jimmy Means	Chevrolet
36	25	Dick May	Chevrolet
37	7	D.K. Ulrich	Chevrolet
38	95	Gary Myers	Chevrolet
39	29	Walter Ballard	Chevrolet
40	91	Bob Burcham	Chevrolet

=== Box Score ===
Cautions: 7 for 38 laps
Margin of victory: under caution

Fin	Grid	Car #	Driver	Car Make	Laps	Status	Laps Led	Points
1	1	21	David Pearson	Mercury	400	4:22:06	230	185 (10)
2	2	43	Richard Petty	Dodge	400	Running	56	175 (5)
3	3	11	Cale Yarborough	Chevrolet	399	Running	108	170 (5)
4	4	2	Bobby Allison	Mercury	397	Running	0	160
5	16	72	Benny Parsons	Chevrolet	396	Running	1	160 (5)
6	7	28	Donnie Allison	Chevrolet	396	Running	0	150
7	10	90	Dick Brooks	Ford	391	Crash	0	146
8	13	54	Lennie Pond	Chevrolet	391	Running	0	142
9	11	18	Harry Gant	Chevrolet	387	Running	0	138
10	32	05	David Sisco	Chevrolet	386	Running	0	134
11	9	88	Darrell Waltrip	Chevrolet	384	Running	0	130
12	20	41	Grant Adcox	Chevrolet	383	Crash	0	127
13	12	48	James Hylton	Chevrolet	383	Running	0	124
14	21	67	Buddy Arrington	Dodge	379	Running	0	121
15	27	68	Janet Guthrie	Chevrolet	379	Running	0	0
16	37	7	D.K. Ulrich	Chevrolet	378	Running	0	115
17	18	3	Richard Childress	Chevrolet	373	Running	0	112
18	14	79	Frank Warren	Dodge	371	Running	0	109
19	30	50	Darrell Bryant	Chevrolet	371	Running	0	106
20	17	19	Cecil Gordon	Chevrolet	365	Running	0	103
21	36	25	Dick May	Chevrolet	361	Running	0	100
22	39	29	Walter Ballard	Chevrolet	356	Running	0	97
23	26	9	Bill Elliott	Ford	343	Engine	0	94
24	23	27	Sam Sommers	Chevrolet	343	Running	0	91
25	29	70	J.D. McDuffie	Chevrolet	303	Running	0	88
26	33	26	Bobby Wawak	Chevrolet	276	Engine	0	85
27	28	8	Ed Negre	Dodge	245	Running	0	82
28	6	15	Buddy Baker	Ford	230	Crash	0	79
29	5	71	Dave Marcis	Dodge	230	Engine	5	81 (5)
30	38	95	Gary Myers	Chevrolet	164	Engine	0	73
31	25	30	Dale Earnhardt	Chevrolet	156	Engine	0	70
32	15	99	Dick Trickle	Ford	142	Engine	0	67
33	22	92	Skip Manning	Chevrolet	137	Engine	0	64
34	8	14	Charlie Glotzbach	Chevrolet	121	Engine	0	61
35	40	91	Bob Burcham	Chevrolet	99	Sway bar	0	58
36	24	60	Jackie Rogers	Chevrolet	88	Steering	0	55
37	19	47	Bruce Hill	Chevrolet	51	Transmission	0	52
38	34	6	Bobby Isaac	Chevrolet	39	Engine	0	49
39	35	52	Jimmy Means	Chevrolet	32	Engine	0	46
40	31	81	Terry Ryan	Chevrolet	11	Hub	0	43

(5) Indicates 5 bonus points added to normal race points scored for leading 1 lap
(10) Indicates 10 bonus points added to normal race points scored for leading 1 lap & leading the most laps.

=== Lap Leader Breakdown ===
Lead changes: 37

Driver	From Lap	To Lap	Number of Laps
Cale Yarborough	1	1	1
David Pearson	2	3	2
Cale Yarborough	4	5	2
David Pearson	6	6	1
Cale Yarborough	7	46	40
Dave Marcis	47	48	2
Cale Yarborough	49	61	13
David Pearson	62	85	24
Benny Parsons	86	86	1
David Pearson	87	97	11
Cale Yarborough	98	104	7
David Pearson	105	117	13
Richard Petty	118	119	2
Cale Yarborough	120	126	7
David Pearson	127	145	19
Dave Marcis	146	147	2
David Pearson	148	150	3
Cale Yarborough	151	152	2
David Pearson	153	156	4
Cale Yarborough	157	162	6
David Pearson	163	169	7
Cale Yarborough	170	171	2
David Pearson	172	185	14
Cale Yarborough	186	196	11
Dave Marcis	197	197	1
Cale Yarborough	198	203	6
David Pearson	204	219	16
Cale Yarborough	220	220	1
David Pearson	221	221	1
Cale Yarborough	222	222	1
David Pearson	223	223	1
Cale Yarborough	224	232	9
David Pearson	233	251	19
Richard Petty	252	300	49
David Pearson	301	363	63
Richard Petty	364	368	5
David Pearson	369	400	32

== Standings after the race ==
Pos	Driver	Points	Differential
1	Benny Parsons	1996	0
2	Cale Yarborough	1982	-14
3	Richard Petty	1898	-98
4	Bobby Allison	1816	-180
5 ▲	Lennie Pond	1730	-266
6 ▼	Dave Marcis	1693	-303
7	Richard Childress	1628	-368
8 ▲	Darrell Waltrip	1514	-482
9 ▼	Buddy Baker	1508	-488
10	Frank Warren	1480	-516

Preceded by 1976 Mason-Dixon 500	NASCAR Winston Cup Season; 1976	Succeeded by 1976 Riverside 400

Preceded by 1975	World 600 races 1976	Succeeded by 1977
