= 1977 World 600 =

Auto race run in North Carolina in 1977

Race details
- Race 13 of 30 in the 1977 NASCAR Winston Cup Series season
- Layout of Charlotte Motor Speedway
- Date: May 29, 1977
- Official name: World 600
- Location: Charlotte Motor Speedway, Concord, North Carolina
- Course: Permanent racing facility
- Course length: 1.500 miles (2.414 km)
- Distance: 400 laps, 600 mi (965 km)
- Weather: Temperatures reaching of 84.9 °F (29.4 °C); wind speeds of 6 miles per hour (9.7 km/h)
- Average speed: 137.676 miles per hour (221.568 km/h)
- Attendance: 115,000

Pole position
Driver	David Pearson	Wood Brothers

Most laps led
Driver	Richard Petty	Petty Enterprises
- Laps: 311

Winner
No. 43	Richard Petty	Petty Enterprises

Television in the United States
- Network: CBS
- Announcers: Ken Squier

The 1977 World 600, the 18th running of the event, was a NASCAR Winston Cup Series racing event that took place on May 29, 1977, at Charlotte Motor Speedway in Concord, North Carolina.

Jim Stacy would become the owner of Krauskopf's NASCAR team after this event; with the famed red #71 Dodge getting repainted into the white #5. Neil Bonnett would stay on the team as driver.

The mega-hit movie Star Wars was released four days before this race.

== Qualifying ==
Grid	No.	Driver	Manufacturer
1	21	David Pearson	Mercury
2	43	Richard Petty	Dodge
3	11	Cale Yarborough	Chevrolet
4	88	Darrell Waltrip	Chevrolet
5	1	Donnie Allison	Chevrolet
6	15	Buddy Baker	Ford
7	72	Benny Parsons	Chevrolet
8	27	Sam Sommers	Chevrolet
9	92	Skip Manning	Chevrolet
10	36	Ron Hutcherson	Chevrolet
11	12	Bobby Allison	AMC Matador
12	49	G.C. Spencer	Dodge
13	14	Coo Coo Marlin	Chevrolet
14	71	Neil Bonnett	Dodge
15	54	Lennie Pond	Chevrolet

== Summary ==
Forty drivers competed including Benny Parsons, Lennie Pond, Buddy Baker, Darrell Waltrip, and Neil Bonnett. After four hours and twenty-one minutes of racing, Richard Petty defeated polesitter David Pearson by 30.8 seconds in front of 115,000 people. There were 25 lead changes in this race and six cautions for 31 laps. The qualifying top speed was 161.435 miles per hour (259.804 km/h), the race average speed was 136.676 miles per hour (219.959 km/h). Last-place finisher Ramo Stott had engine trouble on lap 3 of the 400-lap race.

Drivers who failed to qualify for this race were Rick Newsom and Bruce Jacobi.

Dean Dalton was driving Henley Gray's car when it crashed on lap 64. It looked a lot like Dean Dalton's car with a #19 painted on.

Bobby Allison relieved Benny Parsons for the latter part of the race.

Ricky Rudd would lead the first laps of his NASCAR Cup Series career during this race. Nord Krauskopf would retire as a NASCAR owner after this race; he would sell his team to Jim Stacy and focus running on his insurance business (K&K Insurance) with his wife Theodora.

Pearson's next pole position start would be at the 1977 running of the National 500 (now Bank of America 500); which took place that October.

Notable crew chiefs in the race were Tex Powell, Buddy Parrott, Jake Elder, Harry Hyde, Joey Arrington, Kirk Shelmerdine, Dale Inman, Tim Brewer, and Travis Carter.

=== Timeline ===
Section reference:

- Start of race: David Pearson had an advantage over the rest of the starting grid as the green flag was waved.
- Lap 3: Oil pressure issues forced Ramo Stott to become the last-place finisher.
- Lap 63: Bobby Allison had to leave the race due to engine problems.
- Lap 64: Henley Grey had a terminal crash.
- Lap 87: Engine troubles eliminated Bobby Gale from the event.
- Lap 168: Dave Marcis would be sidelined due to a faulty engine.
- Lap 185: Ed Negre's vehicle developed engine problems.
- Lap 186: A faulty oil pump eliminated D.K. Ulrich from the race.
- Lap 219: Engine problems managed to knock Donnie Allison out of contention.
- Lap 240: David Sisco would see his race day end prematurely due to engine failure.
- Lap 266: Harry Gant's engine failed on this lap.
- Lap 271: The axle on Terry Ryan's vehicle became unsafe, causing him to DNF with a 29th-place finish.
- Lap 300: James Hylton's engine failed, causing him not to finish in the top-10.
- Lap 333: Harold Miller's vehicle developed clutch issues, making him the final DNF of the event.
- Finish: Richard Petty was officially declared the winner of the event.

== Standings after the race ==
Pos	Driver	Points	Differential
1	Cale Yarborough	2176	0
2	Richard Petty	2068	-108
3 ▲	Benny Parsons	2002	-174
4 ▼	Darrell Waltrip	1987	-189
5	Buddy Baker	1745	-431
6 ▲	Dick Brooks	1581	-595
7 ▼	Cecil Gordon	1565	-611
8 ▲	Richard Childress	1542	-634
9 ▼	Dave Marcis	1520	-656
10	James Hylton	1429	-747

Preceded by 1977 Mason-Dixon 500	NASCAR Winston Cup Season; 1977	Succeeded by 1977 NAPA 400

Preceded by 1977 Atlanta 500	Richard Petty's Career Wins; 1960–1984	Succeeded by 1977 NAPA 400

Preceded by 1976	World 600 races 1977	Succeeded by 1978
