= Saugus Speedway =

Former race track in Santa Clarita, California

Coordinates: 34.4164°N 118.5279°W

LA's place to race

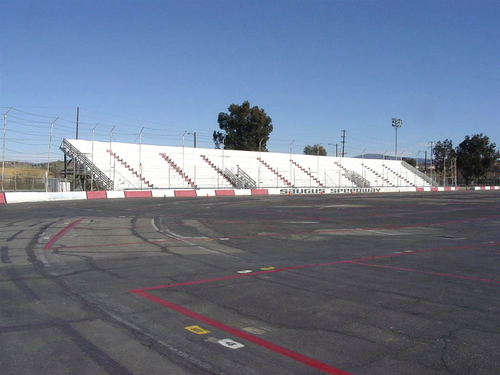
- Saugus Speedway in 2007
- Location: 22500 Soledad Canyon Road; Santa Clarita, California 91350
- Broke ground: 1927
- Opened: 1939
- Closed: July 19, 1995 (race track); October 27, 2024
- Major events: Craftsman Truck Series (1995) Scott Irvin Chevrolet/Craftsman 200 *NASCAR AutoZone Elite Division, Southwest Series *USAC midgets *United Racing Association (1940-1941); Saugus High School and William S. Hart High School Graduations (1994)
- Website: http://www.SantaClaritaSwapMeet.com

Asphalt Oval
- Length: 0.54 km (0.34 mi)
- Banking: flat

Asphalt Figure 8 infield

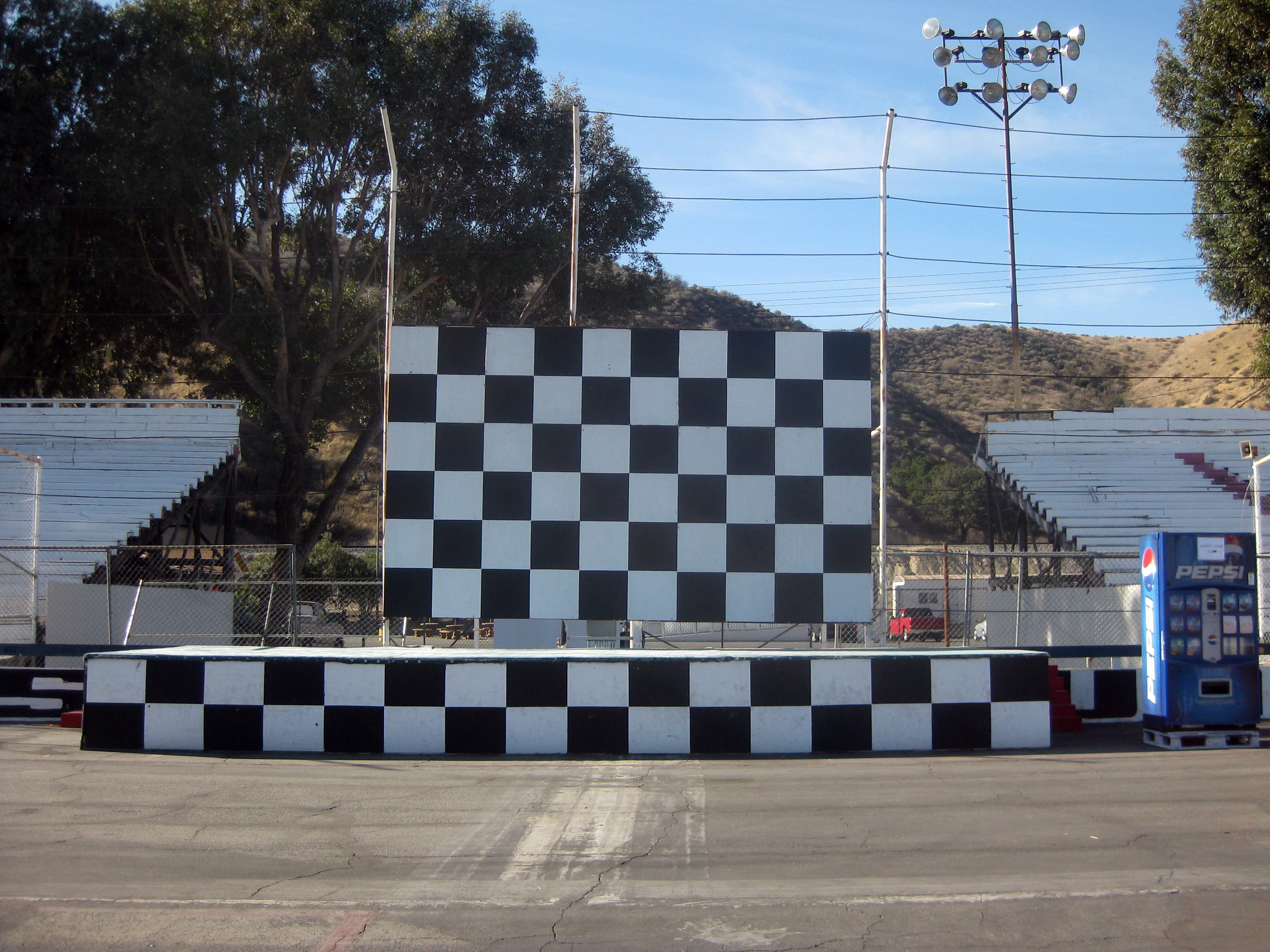
Saugus Speedway (2009)

Saugus Speedway was a 1/3 mile racetrack in Saugus, Santa Clarita, California on a 35-acre (140,000 m^{2}) site. The track hosted one NASCAR Craftsman Truck Series event in 1995, which was won by Ken Schrader. Schrader became the first NASCAR driver to win in a race in all three of the sanctioning body's major series, following previous wins in the Winston Cup and Busch Grand National Series. The stadium was closed on July 19, 1995 and no longer holds races.

== History ==
The track started out as a rodeo arena called Baker Ranch Stadium in 1927. Its construction was announced in December 1926. It was owned by Roy Baker, brother of shoe businessman C. H. Baker. The stadium held 18,000 spectators. During the Great Depression, it was sold in 1930 to Cowboy actor Hoot Gibson. He used the stadium for movie sets. The stadium was sold to Paul Hill in 1934. The valley that the stadium was in got flooded in 1937. Debris from the flood was too much for Hill to deal with, so the bank got the property.

William Bonelli purchased it and renamed Bonelli Stadium. In 1939, Bonelli started hosting open wheel racing on the flat dirt surface. Crowds of 10,000 to 12,000 watched drivers such as Walt Faulkner, Mel Hansen, Allen Heath, Johnny McDowell, Jack McGrath, Danny Oakes, Troy Ruttman, and Bill Vukovich. The track was part of the United Racing Association in 1940 and 1941. The last race during World War II was held on June 30, 1942. The track was unused in 1943 and 1944, like all racetracks in the United States. The track was the first circuit on the West Coast of the United States to host a post-war race when it reopened on September 9, 1945. Bill Vukovich won the race. Nine races were held that season, and Vukovich was crowned the champion.

The track was paved in 1946, but the pavement was removed and the track returned to dirt. Midget car racing was the national sensation in 1946, drawing large crowds to the track. Roadsters were the main class raced at the track from 1947 until 1950, until midget cars came back. The grandstands in the backstretch needed repairs, so the grandstands from Gilmore Stadium were installed after the track closed in 1950. From 1951 to 1955, the roadsters and midget cars shared the track equally, with occasional rodeos and circuses. The track was paved for a second time in 1956. The first stock car racing event on the track happened in 1957. It was promoted by Tony Coldeway, who later formed the Pacific Racing Association. 23 cars and 523 spectators came to the event. The track became mainly used for stock car events after that event. It featured USAC stock cars, NASCAR Winston West Series, and the NASCAR Southwest Tour. It also hosted the third race in NASCAR Craftsman Truck Series history during the series' first year on April 15, 1995. Ken Schrader beat Geoffrey Bodine by 1.7 seconds. The race had the slowest speed in Craftsman Truck Series history with an average speed of 43.526 miles per hour (70.048 kilometers per hour).

In June 1994, the speedway hosted the graduating classes of nearby Saugus High School and William S. Hart High School after the stadium at College of the Canyons was deemed unsafe for occupancy; a consequence of the Northridge Earthquake. The graduation resulted in two new track records: the fastest lap by unmotorized participants, as well as the slowest lap by any means of propulsion. The track closed unexpectedly on July 19, 1995 in the middle of the season after the grandstands had been red-tagged and condemned by the County of Los Angeles, and have since been torn down.

Saugus Speedway briefly became a venue for the Turkey Night Grand Prix In 1991, after Ascot Park (speedway) was closed down with the 1990 race being the final event, In a bid while the Agajanians negotiated with Perris Auto Speedway, they eventually settled to run at Saugus. It was a cold race with temperatures in the main event being below 50 °F, which made the flat surface of the speedway slippery. Stan Fox won both the Final Ascot Park Turkey Night Grand Prix and then the first Turkey Night Grand Prix held at Saugus Speedway, before the event moved to Bakersfield Speedway in Oildale in 1992.

After the track was closed down from stock car racing it briefly became a go kart track until the mid–2000s.

On October 7, 2024, it was announced that Saugus Speedway would close for good on October 27, 2024 with the final event being the Santa Clarita Swap Meet. The site has been proposed for a housing development.

As of September 2025, the track in its entirety has been razed, but the scar signifying where the track once sat persists.

== Other uses ==
The track hosted weekly swapmeets on Sundays, and flea markets on Saturday (from 2011 to 2015) and Tuesday. The (Saugus) Santa Clarita Swap Meet featured over 600 vendors and 15,000 people each Sunday since 1963. The swap meet closed permanently on September 27, 2024. The track hosted numerous special events and festivals, including car shows, antique appraisals, and concerts. The track has been used for numerous films and television productions (The Dukes of Hazzard, The A-Team, Knight Rider, CHiPs, Dynasty, The Fall Guy, The Incredible Hulk, Power Rangers Turbo, Police Woman, The Rockford Files, Hardcastle and McCormick and G4's Proving Ground to name a few).

The property was sold to a developer in January 2025.

== Notable drivers ==
- Sonny Easley
- Eddie Gray
- Lance Hooper
- Ron Hornaday Jr.
- Ron Hornaday Sr.
- Jimmy Insolo
- Nick Joanides (final track record holder in the Super Late Model Division 15.95)
- Sean Woodside, 1994 and 1995 track champ, NASCAR Southwest Tour
- Rick Crow (final track record holder in the Street Stock Division Oval & Figure 8)
