= Ascot Park (speedway) =

Former dirt race track

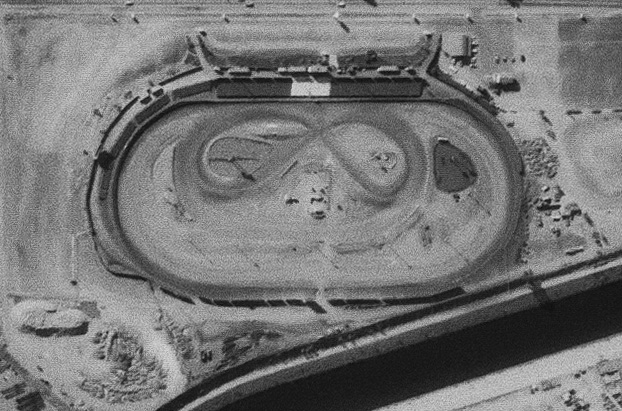
- Ascot Park Speedway (1972)
- Coordinates: 33°51′52″N 118°17′21″W
- Capacity: 7,500
- Owner: Max Ziegler
- Operator: J. C. Agajanian (1976–1984)
- Opened: 1957
- Closed: November 22, 1990
- Former names: Los Angeles Speedway (1957); New Ascot Stadium (1958–1960)
- Major events: CRA; NASCAR Grand National; AMA Grand National Championship; USAC events

outer oval track
- Surface: dirt
- Length: 0.50 mi (0.8 km)
- Turns: 4

inner oval
- Surface: dirt
- Length: 0.25 mi (0.4 km)

Ascot Park, first named Los Angeles Speedway and later New Ascot Stadium, was a dirt racetrack located near Gardena, California. Ascot Park was open between 1957 and 1990. The track held numerous United States Auto Club (USAC) national tour races and three NASCAR Grand National (now NASCAR Cup Series) races. The Turkey Night Grand Prix was held at the track for several decades.

== History ==
Ascot Park was the fourth of four Ascot sites in Los Angeles after the original one-mile Ascot Speedway at Central & Florence was open between 1907 and 1919. A second site named Legion Ascot Speedway held races between 1924 and 1936. Legion Ascot closed after 24 drivers died while racing at the track. A third site named Southern Ascot held races between 1937 and 1942 in South Gate on a half mile dirt oval.

Los Angeles Speedway opened in 1957, on the site of a former city dump. It was built less than 1 mile (1.6 km) from the former site of Carrell Speedway, which had been closed in late 1954 to make way for the Artesia Freeway. The track was renamed to New Ascot Stadium in October 1958 as part of a management change. The track assumed the name it held until its closure, Ascot Park in 1961. J. C. Agajanian promoted major races at the venue, and later leased the track from 1976 until his death in 1984, when his family continued operating the venue. His radio advertisements ended with the phrase "Come to Ascot, where the 110, the 405 and the 91 freeways collide!".

With seating for only 7,500, Ascot Park was smaller than the other tracks of the area including the Ontario Motor Speedway (closed in 1980), and the Riverside International Raceway (closed in 1989). However, the park was equally well-known, due to its being surrounded by freeways for easy access, its regularly scheduled races, and its heavy radio advertising.

The half-mile course featured tight semi-banked turns, long straight-ways, and a tacky surface that was conducive to dramatic sprint car racing. Other motorsport events, such as Figure 8 racing and motorcycle flat track, TT racing and motocross, were also held at Ascot.

The dirt racetrack hosted races in the United States Auto Club (USAC) sprint car championship, the AMA Grand National Championship motorcycle series. Ascot was also the site of the annual USAC Turkey Night Grand Prix midget race on Thanksgiving.

Though he began doing stunt jumps in 1966 at small venues such as fairs and carnivals, Evel Knievel (Robert Craig Knievel) gained international attention with his first televised jump on ABC’s Wide World of Sports at Ascot Park Raceway on March 25, 1967, successfully clearing 15 cars.

The racetrack was also used in movies and TV shows like the original Gone in 60 Seconds, A Very Brady Christmas, Pit Stop, T J Hooker and CHiPs.

The 50th annual Turkey Night Grand Prix for USAC midget cars became the last of more than 5,000 main events held since the track opened. Ascot Park was closed in November 1990. It remained unused after a failed development project occupied the former site for a number of years. The track site was later replaced by Insurance Auto Auctions building and storage yard.

ESPN was hosting live races of Thursday Night Thunder sprint car racing from 1988 to the track's closing in 1990 and later went over to Indianapolis Raceway Park and the show was later moved to Saturday night. Some of the most famous drivers to race at Ascot were Jeff Gordon, Sleepy Tripp, and Dick Mann, among others.

=== NASCAR race results ===
Three NASCAR Grand National Series events were held at the track. The 1957 event was held on the 0.5-mile (0.80 km) track. It was won by Eddie Pagan. The second NASCAR event was a 500 lap event on the 0.4-mile (0.64 km) track, and it was won by Parnelli Jones. The final event was held in 1961 on the 0.5-mile (0.80 km) track. Eddie Gray lapped the field for the win.

== See also ==
- Eddie Gray (notable Ascot Park weekly series alumni)
- Christopher J.C. Agajanian
- Figure 8 racing
