= Phil Parsons =

NASCAR commentator and former driver

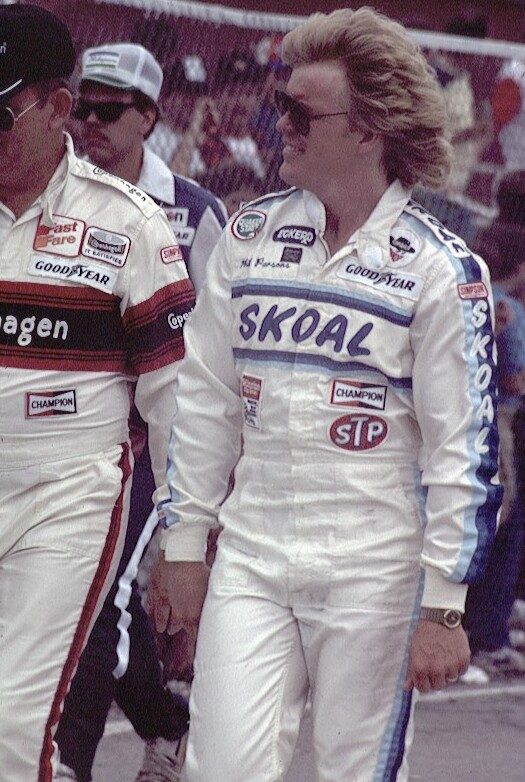
- Parsons (right) alongside brother Benny
- Born: June 21, 1957 (age 69); Detroit, Michigan, U.S.
- Achievements: 1988 Winston 500 Winner

NASCAR Cup Series career
- 203 races run over 13 years
- Best finish: 9th (1988)
- First race: 1983 Daytona 500 (Daytona)
- Last race: 1997 TranSouth Financial 400 (Darlington)
- First win: 1988 Winston 500 (Talladega)
Wins	Top tens	Poles
1	40	0

NASCAR O'Reilly Auto Parts Series career
- 285 races run over 17 years
- Best finish: 5th (1982)
- First race: 1982 Goody's 300 (Daytona)
- Last race: 2001 Outback Steakhouse 300 (Kentucky)
- First win: 1982 Southeastern 150 (Bristol)
- Last win: 1994 Champion 300 (Charlotte)
Wins	Top tens	Poles
2	96	6

Phillip Gregory Parsons (born June 21, 1957) is an American former professional stock car racing driver, team owner, and analyst for FOX NASCAR since 2003. After years racing in NASCAR Winston Cup, he returned to the Busch Series where he enjoyed modest success.

After his racing career, Parsons also embarked on a career as a racing TV commentator, providing color analysis for the Mizlou Television Network. He was also a commentator for the DirecTV NASCAR Hot Pass during Sprint Cup races. Most recently he has been a color analyst for FS1's coverage of the NASCAR Craftsman Truck Series and, currently, the ARCA Menards Series.

Parsons was the starter for the 2007 Daytona 500, waving the green flag. In 2008, he became a part-owner of a (now former) Nationwide Series team, Phil Parsons Racing.

== Beginnings ==
Parsons began racing in the Late Model Series and the NASCAR Goody's Dash Series. When the Late Model Series became the Busch Series in 1982, Parsons joined the circuit full-time, driving the No. 28 Skoal Pontiac for Johnny Hayes. He won his first career race, at Bristol Motor Speedway, and led the championship points early in the season. He won the pole in two of the last three races of the season and finished fifth in points. The following season, he competed in a limited schedule, 22 out of 35 races, but won four poles and had twelve top-tens, finishing fifth in the points. That season, he also ran five Winston Cup races with Hayes in the No. 66, posting two top-ten finishes.

== Winston Cup ==
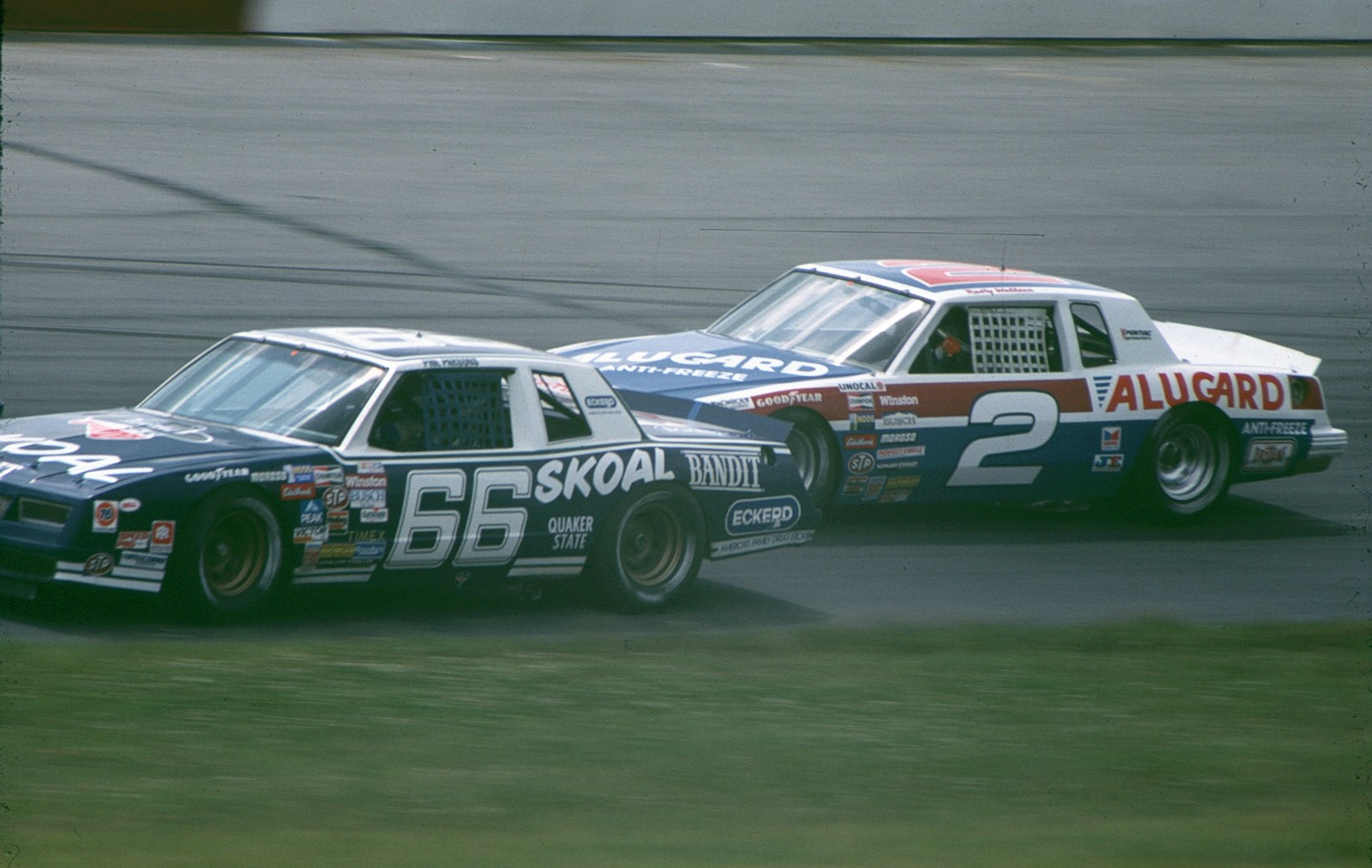
1985 Jackson Bros. Motorsports No. 66

In 1984, Hayes and Parsons joined the Cup Series and ran twenty-two races, posting three top-eight finishes and ended the season placing 24th in the standings, second behind Rusty Wallace for NASCAR Rookie of the Year. The same year, his Busch ride was bought by Jack Ingram and Parsons ran five races for him, and had two top-five finishes. In 1985, he ran the full season, splitting time between Jackson Bros. Motorsports and Roger Hamby's car. Despite four top-tens, he failed to finish in thirteen races, and wound up 21st in points.

In 1986, Parsons ran seventeen races, and had a best finish of fifth at Talladega. He had four more top-tens, but finished twenty-seventh in the final standings. The following season, he got his first full-time Cup ride, with the Jackson brothers, when he signed on to drive their No. 55 Oldsmobile, garnering seven top-tens and a fourteenth-place finish in the final points standings. In 1988, Parsons led 52 laps at the Winston 500 and achieved his only Cup win. He also had a career-best points finish of ninth that season. The next season, however, he only had two top-five finishes and lost his ride at the end of the season.

Parsons began 1990 driving the No. 4 car for Morgan–McClure Motorsports, but was released only three races into the season. He ran at Bristol for Jackson in a one-race deal, finishing the race in 25th, and also drove for Phil Barkdoll and Lake Speed. He made his most starts with the fledgling Diamond Ridge Motorsports, his best finish with them was a 21st at Darlington. He did not run the Cup series in 1991, but rather a handful of Busch races in his own equipment leased from Diamond Ridge. He had two top-tens, including a fourth-place finish at Darlington. After beginning 1992 with a tenth-place at the Daytona 500 with Melling Racing, he returned to Busch to run seven races, and had five top-tens.

In 1993, Parsons returned to the Cup Series, running the No. 41 Chevy for Larry Hedrick Motorsports. Despite an eighth-place finish at Rockingham Speedway, Parsons was released near the end of the season. Phil ended the 1993 season with a ninth place finish at Atlanta Motor Speedway while driving for Butch Mock Motorsports.

== Return to Busch Series ==
In 1994, Parsons returned to the Busch Series on a limited schedule in a car owned by his wife Marcia. He won his second and final Busch race at the Champion 300, and finished 25th in points after running just seventeen races. He went back to full-time racing in 1995 in the No. 99 Luxaire Chevrolet for J&J Racing, posting nine top-tens and finishing eighth in points. The following season, he and Marcia returned to car owner duties with the No. 10 Channellock Chevrolet. He began the season with consecutive third-place finishes but moved down to ninth in points. The next season, he finished in the top-ten in each of the first six races of the season posted a best finish of sixth in points. He also made his final Cup start that season for SABCO Racing at Darlington, when he replaced Joe Nemechek, who was on bereavement leave (Nemechek's brother John was killed at Homestead the previous week). He finished 31st.

With sponsorship from Dura Lube in 1998, Parsons matched his 1997 points finish. Alltel joined as primary sponsors for 1999, but Parsons failed to qualify for the NAPA 200 and dropped to fifteenth in the standings. At the end of the season, he merged his team with ST Motorsports to drive the No. 59 Chevrolet, and finished twelfth in points despite just two top-tens. His last start in NASCAR competition came at Kentucky Speedway in 2001. Driving the No. 97 Curb Agajanian Performance Group car, Parsons started fifth but finished 34th after a wreck late in the race.

== Motorsports career results ==
=== NASCAR ===
(key) (Bold – Pole position awarded by qualifying time. Italics – Pole position earned by points standings or practice time. * – Most laps led.)

==== Winston Cup Series ====
NASCAR Winston Cup Series results
Year	Team	No.	Make	1	2	3	4	5	6	7	8	9	10	11	12	13	14	15	16	17	18	19	20	21	22	23	24	25	26	27	28	29	30	31	32	33	NWCC	Pts	Ref
1983	Johnny Hayes Racing	66	Buick	DAY; 13	RCH	CAR	ATL	DAR	NWS	MAR																											43rd	458	
1983	Johnny Hayes Racing	66	Pontiac								TAL; 28	NSV	DOV	BRI	CLT	RSD	POC	MCH	DAY	NSV	POC	TAL															43rd	458	
1983	Johnny Hayes Racing	66	Chevy																				MCH; 31	BRI	DAR	RCH	DOV	MAR	NWS	CLT; 19	CAR	ATL; 28	RSD				43rd	458	
1984	Johnny Hayes Racing	66	Chevy	DAY; 11	RCH; 18	CAR	ATL; 29	BRI; 13	NWS; 15	DAR; 8	MAR; 16	TAL; 7	NSV	DOV	CLT; 31	RSD	POC; 21	MCH; 15	DAY; 13	NSV; 13	POC; 17	TAL; 20	MCH; 29	BRI; 26	DAR; 7	RCH	DOV	MAR; 20	CLT; 31	NWS; 15	CAR	ATL; 28	RSD; 41				24th	2290	
1985	Jackson Bros. Motorsports	66	Chevy	DAY; 29			ATL; 41		DAR; 8			TAL; 34		CLT; 33		POC; 11	MCH; 19	DAY; 27	POC; 8	TAL; 31	MCH; 6		DAR; 39					CLT; 27		ATL; 14							21st	2740	
1985	Hamby Racing	17	Chevy		RCH; 15	CAR; 19		BRI; 28		NWS; 15	MAR; 9		DOV; 29		RSD; 33							BRI; 21		RCH; 27	DOV; 12	MAR; 20	NWS; 13		CAR; 13		RSD; 33						21st	2740	
1986	Jackson Bros. Motorsports	66	Olds	DAY; 24			ATL; 18	BRI				TAL; 5	DOV	CLT; 24	RSD	POC; 31	MCH; 33	DAY; 9	POC; 37	TAL; 13	GLN; 14	MCH; 9	BRI	DAR; 22	RCH	DOV	MAR	NWS	CLT; 10	CAR	ATL; 10	RSD					27th	1742	
1986	Hamby Racing	17	Olds		RCH; 29	CAR; 30																															27th	1742	
1986	Jackson Bros. Motorsports	66	Pontiac						DAR; 31	NWS	MAR																										27th	1742	
1987	Jackson Bros. Motorsports	55	Olds	DAY; 11	CAR; 11	RCH; 15	ATL; 27	DAR; 9	NWS; 7	BRI; 20	MAR; 4	TAL; 31	CLT; 8	DOV; 22	POC; 11	RSD; 11	MCH; 21	DAY; 15	POC; 39	TAL; 29	GLN; 7	MCH; 14	BRI; 19	DAR; 12	RCH; 20	DOV; 29	MAR; 16	NWS; 14	CLT; 27	CAR; 9	RSD; 13	ATL; 8					14th	3327	
1988	Jackson Bros. Motorsports	55	Olds	DAY; 3	RCH; 30	CAR; 15	ATL; 37	DAR; 8	BRI; 22	NWS; 7	MAR; 9	TAL; 1	CLT; 8	DOV; 39	RSD; 5	POC; 8	MCH; 7	DAY; 3	POC; 31	TAL; 11	GLN; 4	MCH; 20	BRI; 19	DAR; 6	RCH; 24	DOV; 14	MAR; 21	CLT; 27	NWS; 2	CAR; 8	PHO; 9	ATL; 16					9th	3630	
1989	Jackson Bros. Motorsports	55	Olds	DAY; 5	CAR; 39	ATL; 14	RCH; 27	DAR; 41	BRI; 23	NWS; DNQ	MAR; 13	TAL; 17	CLT; 13	DOV; 10	SON; 18	POC; 12	MCH; 15	DAY; 3	POC; 12	TAL; 41	GLN; 17	MCH; 33	BRI; 11	DAR; 21	RCH; 36	DOV; 13	MAR; 14	CLT; 20	NWS; 28	CAR; 24	PHO; 37	ATL; 42					21st	2933	
1989	Combs Racing	60	Chevy							NWS; 12																											21st	2933	
1990	Morgan–McClure Motorsports	4	Olds	DAY; 42	RCH; 26	CAR; 14	ATL	DAR																													39th	632	
1990	Leo Jackson Motorsports	33	Olds						BRI; 25	NWS	MAR																										39th	632	
1990	Barkdoll Motorsports	72	Olds									TAL; 35	CLT	DOV	SON	POC																					39th	632	
1990	Diamond Ridge Motorsports	29	Pontiac														MCH; 22	DAY	POC	TAL; 41	GLN	MCH	BRI	DAR; 19	RCH	DOV	MAR	NWS									39th	632	
1990	Speed Racing	83	Olds																										CLT; 18	CAR	PHO	ATL					39th	632	
1991	Italian Connection	96	Chevy	DAY; DNQ	RCH	CAR	ATL	DAR	BRI	NWS	MAR	TAL	CLT	DOV	SON	POC	MCH	DAY	POC	TAL	GLN	MCH	BRI	DAR	RCH	DOV	MAR	NWS	CLT	CAR	PHO	ATL					NA	-	
1992	Melling Racing	9	Ford	DAY; 10	CAR; 30	RCH	ATL	DAR	BRI	NWS	MAR	TAL	CLT	DOV	SON	POC	MCH	DAY	POC	TAL	GLN	MCH	BRI	DAR	RCH	DOV	MAR	NWS	CLT	CAR	PHO	ATL					53rd	207	
1993	Larry Hedrick Motorsports	41	Chevy	DAY; 22	CAR; 8	RCH; 16	ATL; 39	DAR; 36	BRI; 31	NWS; 18	MAR; 20	TAL; 19	SON; 37	CLT; 12	DOV; 37	POC; 14	MCH; 13	DAY; 25	NHA; 39	POC; 18	TAL; 22	GLN; 33	MCH; 19	BRI; 14	DAR; 21	RCH; 20	DOV; 37	MAR; 19	NWS	CLT	CAR	PHO					29th	2454	
1993	Butch Mock Motorsports	75	Ford																														ATL; 9				29th	2454	
1994	J&J Racing	99	Olds	DAY	CAR	RCH	ATL	DAR	BRI	NWS	MAR	TAL	SON	CLT	DOV	POC	MCH	DAY	NHA	POC; DNQ	TAL	IND	GLN														50th	243	
1994	Melling Racing	9	Ford																					MCH; 31		DAR; 15	RCH; DNQ	DOV	MAR	NWS; 36	CLT; DNQ	CAR	PHO	ATL			50th	243	
1994	Hagan Racing	14	Chevy																						BRI; DNQ												50th	243	
1995	TriStar Motorsports	19	Ford	DAY; 41	CAR; DNQ	RCH	ATL; 42	DAR; DNQ	BRI	NWS	MAR	TAL	SON	CLT	DOV	POC	MCH	DAY	NHA	POC	TAL	IND	GLN	MCH	BRI	DAR	RCH	DOV	MAR	NWS	CLT	CAR	PHO	ATL			60th	77	
1997	Team SABCO	42	Chevy	DAY	CAR	RCH	ATL	DAR; 31	TEX	BRI	MAR	SON	TAL	CLT	DOV	POC	MCH	CAL	DAY	NHA	POC	IND	GLN	MCH	BRI	DAR	RCH	NHA	DOV	MAR	CLT	TAL	CAR	PHO	ATL		62nd	70	
1998	Dale Earnhardt, Inc.	1	Chevy	DAY	CAR	LVS	ATL; DNQ	DAR	BRI	TEX	MAR	TAL	CAL	CLT	DOV	RCH	MCH	POC	SON	NHA	POC	IND	GLN	MCH	BRI	NHA	DAR	RCH	DOV	MAR	CLT	TAL	DAY	PHO	CAR	ATL	NA	-	

===== Daytona 500 =====
Year	Team	Manufacturer	Start	Finish
1983	Johnny Hayes Racing	Buick	32	13
1984	Johnny Hayes Racing	Chevrolet	13	11
1985	Jackson Bros. Motorsports	Chevrolet	12	29
1986	Jackson Bros. Motorsports	Oldsmobile	18	24
1987	Jackson Bros. Motorsports	Oldsmobile	19	11
1988	Jackson Bros. Motorsports	Oldsmobile	19	3
1989	Jackson Bros. Motorsports	Oldsmobile	7	5
1990	Morgan–McClure Motorsports	Oldsmobile	8	42
1991	Italian Connection	Chevrolet	DNQ	
1992	Melling Racing	Ford	19	10
1993	Larry Hedrick Motorsports	Chevrolet	16	22
1995	TriStar Motorsports	Ford	32	41

==== Busch Series ====
NASCAR Busch Series results
Year	Team	No.	Make	1	2	3	4	5	6	7	8	9	10	11	12	13	14	15	16	17	18	19	20	21	22	23	24	25	26	27	28	29	30	31	32	33	34	35	NBSC	Pts	Ref
1982	Johnny Hayes Racing	28	Pontiac	DAY; 8	RCH; 9	BRI; 1	MAR; 36	DAR; 17	HCY; 3	SBO; 16	CRW; 19	RCH; 6	LGY; 3	DOV; 7	HCY; 23	CLT; 22	ASH; 7	HCY; 9	SBO; 3	CAR; 3	CRW; 22	SBO; 18	HCY; 8	LGY; 6	IRP; 20	BRI; 27	HCY; 9	RCH; 20	MAR; 6	**CLT**; 7	**HCY**; 9	MAR; 7							5th	3783	
1983	Johnny Hayes Racing	28	Pontiac	DAY; 4	RCH; 7	CAR; 9	HCY; 8	MAR; 16	NWS; 11	SBO; 24	GPS	LGY	DOV	BRI	CLT	SBO	HCY	ROU; 8	SBO; 7	ROU	CRW; 19	ROU; 4	**SBO**; 16	HCY; 17	LGY	**IRP**; 4	GPS	**BRI**; 13	HCY	DAR; 13	RCH; 13	**NWS**; 7	SBO; 6	MAR; 4	ROU	CLT; 32	HCY	MAR; 7	15th	2904	
1984	Johnny Hayes Racing	28	Pontiac	DAY; 9	RCH	CAR	HCY	MAR	DAR	ROU	NSV	LGY	MLW	DOV	CLT; 37	SBO	HCY	ROU	SBO	ROU	HCY	IRP	LGY	SBO	BRI; 3	DAR	RCH	NWS	CLT; 2	HCY	CAR	MAR; 17							35th	637	
1985	Johnny Hayes Racing	28	Pontiac	DAY; 42	CAR	HCY	BRI; 25	MAR	DAR	SBO	LGY	DOV	CLT	SBO	HCY	ROU	IRP	SBO	LGY	HCY	MLW	BRI	DAR	RCH	NWS	ROU	CLT	HCY	CAR	MAR									95th	37	
1986	Ingram Racing	11	Pontiac	DAY	CAR	HCY	MAR	BRI	DAR	SBO	LGY	JFC	DOV	CLT	SBO	HCY	ROU	IRP	SBO	RAL	OXF	SBO	HCY	LGY	ROU	BRI	DAR	RCH	DOV	MAR	ROU; 16	CLT	CAR	MAR					119th	0	
1989	Beverley Racing	55	Olds	DAY; 24	CAR; 35	MAR	HCY	DAR; 4	BRI; 12	NZH	SBO	LAN	NSV	CLT; 27	DOV; 2	ROU	LVL	VOL	MYB	SBO	HCY	DUB	IRP	ROU	BRI	DAR; 2	RCH	DOV; 31	MAR	CLT; 10	CAR; 2	MAR							33rd	1098	
1991	Phil Parsons Racing	29	Olds	DAY; DNQ	RCH	CAR	MAR	VOL	HCY	DAR; 4	BRI	LAN	SBO	NZH	CLT; 42	DOV	ROU	HCY	MYB	GLN; 15	OXF	NHA	SBO	DUB	IRP	ROU	BRI	DAR; 29	RCH	DOV	CLT; 9	NHA	CAR; 29	MAR					46th	605	
1992	Phil Parsons Racing	29	Olds	DAY	CAR	RCH	ATL; 10	MAR	DAR; 31	BRI	HCY	LAN	DUB	NZH	CLT; 10	DOV	ROU	MYB	GLN; 27	VOL	NHA	TAL	IRP	ROU	MCH; 7	NHA	BRI	DAR; 9	RCH	DOV	CLT; 10	MAR	CAR	HCY					45th	838	
1993	Phil Parsons Racing	29	Chevy	DAY; DNQ	CAR									DOV; 5	MYB					MCH; 39	NHA	BRI	DAR	RCH			CLT; 22	MAR	CAR; DNQ	HCY									43rd	813	
1993	Phil Parsons Racing	29	Olds			RCH; 36	DAR; 35	BRI	HCY	ROU	MAR	NZH	CLT; 6			GLN; 32	MLW	TAL	IRP						DOV; 8	ROU													43rd	813	
1993	Three Star Motorsports	18	Chevy																												ATL; 40								43rd	813	
1994	Phil Parsons Racing	29	Chevy	DAY; 36			ATL; 41	MAR	DAR; 8	HCY					CLT; 1									MCH; 17				DOV; 8	CLT; 16										25th	1839	
1994	Phil Parsons Racing	29	Olds		CAR; 31	RCH										DOV; 12	MYB	GLN; 37	MLW	SBO	TAL	HCY				DAR; 24													25th	1839	
1994	Shoemaker Racing	64	Chevy								BRI; 9	ROU	NHA	NZH									IRP; 16																25th	1839	
1994	J&J Racing	99	Chevy																						BRI; 18		RCH; 16			MAR; 14	CAR; 16								25th	1839	
1995	J&J Racing	99	Chevy	DAY; 30	CAR; 6	RCH; 9	ATL; 14	NSV; 11	DAR; 5	BRI; 23			NZH; 23	CLT; 22	DOV; 7	MYB; 25	GLN; 10	MLW; 29	TAL; 35	SBO; 24	IRP; 35	MCH; 6	BRI; 13	DAR; 4	RCH; 14	DOV; 3	CLT; 17	CAR; 25	HOM; 6										8th	2985	
1995	J&J Racing	99	Olds								HCY; 14																												8th	2985	
1995	Phil Parsons Racing	94	Chevy									NHA; 24																											8th	2985	
1996	Phil Parsons Racing	10	Chevy	DAY; 24	CAR; 14	RCH; 29	ATL; 3	NSV; 3	DAR; 22	BRI; 4	HCY; 20	NZH; 12	CLT; 15	DOV; 8	SBO; 15	MYB; 17	GLN; 13	MLW; 30	NHA; 40	TAL; 38	IRP; 23	MCH; 14	BRI; 3	DAR; 41	RCH; 30	DOV; 3	CLT; 18	CAR; 29	HOM; 12										9th	2854	
1997	Phil Parsons Racing	10	Chevy	DAY; 10	CAR; 4	RCH; 4	ATL; 8	LVS; 7	DAR; 5	HCY; 19	TEX; 6	BRI; 8	NSV; 12	TAL; 39	NHA; 5	NZH; 20	CLT; 5	DOV; 18	SBO; 16	GLN; 17	MLW; 7	MYB; 13	GTY; 23	IRP; 28	MCH; 9	BRI; 32	DAR; 28	RCH; 12	DOV; 22	CLT; 26	CAL; 32	CAR; 11	HOM; 30						6th	3523	
1998	Phil Parsons Racing	10	Chevy	DAY; 10	CAR; 40	LVS; 37	NSV; 38	DAR; 13	BRI; 7	TEX; 4	HCY; 18	TAL; 2	NHA; 15	NZH; 16	CLT; 35	DOV; 7	RCH; 16	PPR; 2	GLN; 25	MLW; 11	MYB; 21	CAL; 4	SBO; 11	IRP; 34	MCH; 18	BRI; 2	DAR; 25	RCH; 27	DOV; 11	CLT; 31	GTY; 14	CAR; 24	ATL; 8	HOM; 13					6th	3525	
1999	Phil Parsons Racing	10	Chevy	DAY; 33	CAR; 28	LVS; 13	ATL; 28	DAR; 3	TEX; 24	NSV; 10	BRI; 28	TAL; 35	CAL; 42	NHA; 25	RCH; 15	NZH; 9	CLT; 23	DOV; 19	SBO; 13	GLN; 22	MLW; 20	MYB; 9	PPR; 10	GTY; 35	IRP; 15	MCH; DNQ	BRI; 33	DAR; 29	RCH; 34	DOV; 8	CLT; 42	CAR; 21	MEM; 16	PHO; 43	HOM; 24				15th	2951	
2000	ST Motorsports	59	Chevy	DAY; 13	CAR; 23	LVS; 14	ATL; 14	DAR; 20	BRI; 17	TEX; 34	NSV; 29	TAL; 23	CAL; 24	RCH; 10	NHA; 12	CLT; 24	DOV; 29	SBO; 15	MYB; 27	GLN; 25	MLW; 42	NZH; 20	PPR; 5	GTY; 23	IRP; 22	MCH; 19	BRI; 14	DAR; 17	RCH; 39	DOV; 15	CLT; 31	CAR; 22	MEM; 19	PHO; 26	HOM; 19				12th	3176	
2001	Curb Agajanian Performance Group	97	Chevy	DAY	CAR	LVS	ATL	DAR	BRI	TEX	NSH	TAL	CAL	RCH	NHA	NZH	CLT	DOV	KEN; 34	MLW	GLN	CHI	GTY	PPR	IRP	MCH	BRI	DAR	RCH	DOV	KAN	CLT	MEM	PHO	CAR	HOM			121st	61	

=== ARCA Permatex SuperCar Series ===
(key) (Bold – Pole position awarded by qualifying time. Italics – Pole position earned by points standings or practice time. * – Most laps led.)

ARCA Permatex SuperCar Series results
Year	Team	No.	Make	1	2	3	4	5	6	7	8	9	10	11	12	13	14	15	16	17	18	19	20	APSC	Pts	Ref
1980		27	Pontiac	DAY	**NWS**; 1*	FRS	FRS	MCH	TAL	IMS	FRS	MCH												NA	0	
1981	Jerry Harris	48	Pontiac	DAY; 4	DSP	FRS	FRS	BFS																16th	310	
1981		8	Pontiac						TAL; 7	FRS	COR													16th	310	
1991	Melling Racing	18	Ford	DAY	ATL	KIL	TAL	TOL	FRS	POC	MCH	KIL	FRS	DEL	POC	TAL	HPT	MCH	ISF	TOL	DSF	TWS	ATL; 21	133rd	-	

=== 24 Hours of Daytona ===
(key)

24 Hours of Daytona results
Year	Class	No	Team	Car	Co-drivers	Laps	Position	Class Pos.
1986	GTO	28	(United States) Texas Enterprises	Oldsmobile Calais	(United States) Terry Labonte (United States) Harry Gant	3	66 ^{DNF}	23 ^{DNF}
