= Tim Williamson (racing driver) =

American racing driver (1956–1980)

- Born: January 13, 1956; Seaside, California, U.S.
- Died: January 12, 1980 (aged 23); Riverside, California, U.S.
- Cause of death: Basilar skull fracture and severe chest injuries sustained from 1980 Stock Car Products 300 crash
- Awards: 1979 NASCAR Winston West Series Rookie of the Year; West Coast Stock Car Hall of Fame (2011)

NASCAR Cup Series career
- 3 races run over 1 year
- Best finish: 53rd (1979)
- First race: 1979 Winston Western 500 (Riverside)
- Last race: 1979 Los Angeles Times 500 (Ontario)
Wins	Top tens	Poles
0	1	0

ARCA Menards Series West career
- 21 races run over 2 years
- Best finish: 2nd (1979)
- First race: 1978 Winston Stockton 100 (Stockton)
- Last race: 1979 NAPA Arizona 250 (Phoenix)
- First win: 1978 Winston Stockton 100 (Stockton)
- Last win: 1979 Winston Roseville 100 (Roseville)
Wins	Top tens	Poles
2	16	4
- Statistics up to date as of May 5, 2026.

Tim Williamson (January 13, 1956 – January 12, 1980) was an American professional stock car racing driver. A competitor in the NASCAR Winston West Series, he won rookie of the year in 1979. The following year, he was killed in a Grand American race at Riverside International Raceway just a day shy of his birthday.

== Racing career ==
Williamson competed in the Rose Classic at All American Speedway three times between 1976 and 1979, with a fifth place result in 1977. He finished second in the 1978 Copper World Classic. He competed in the NASCAR Grand American Stock Car National Championship between 1978 and 1980, although specific results are unknown. He competed in at least five of six races in the International Drivers Challenge in 1978, finishing fifth or better in each. Also in 1978, Williamson began competing in the NASCAR Winston West Series. In his first career start, coming at Stockton 99 Speedway, he started on pole and led all but one lap, scoring the win. He ran four more races that year, scoring another pole and two top-tens. He moved to competing full-time in the series in 1979, driving for his father Charles. In running full time, he competed in three NASCAR Winston Cup Series events that were in combination with the West Series, finishing ninth in his Cup debut. He finished in the top-ten in thirteen of sixteen races and scored a win at All American Speedway, ultimately finishing second in the points standings, five points behind Bill Schmitt, and winning rookie of the year. Other series he competed in during 1979 included the Western States Open Competition Series, NASCAR Modified National Championship, where he competed at Daytona International Speedway, and SCCA Trans-Am Championship.

== Death ==
On January 12, 1980, Williamson took part in the Stock Car Products 300 at Riverside International Raceway. He was attempting to make a pass on Glen Steurer in the esses when he lost control of his car and slammed broadside into the wall in turn six. The impact shattered all the car's glass and left the car laying half off the track. Williamson was taken to Riverside Community Hospital, where he died from a basilar skull fracture and severe chest injuries. Williamson's parents were attending the race. It was the first driver fatality at the track since Sonny Easley in 1978.

== Motorsports career results ==
=== NASCAR ===
(key) (Bold – Pole position awarded by qualifying time. Italics – Pole position earned by points standings or practice time. * – Most laps led.)

==== Winston Cup Series ====
NASCAR Winston Cup Series results
Year	Team	No.	Make	1	2	3	4	5	6	7	8	9	10	11	12	13	14	15	16	17	18	19	20	21	22	23	24	25	26	27	28	29	30	31	NWCSC	Pts	Ref
1979	Williamson Racing	74	Chevy	RSD; 9	DAY	CAR	RCH	ATL	NWS	BRI	DAR	MAR	TAL	NSV	DOV	CLT	TWS																		53rd	320	
1979	Williamson Racing	29	Chevy															RSD; 26	MCH	DAY	NSV	POC	TAL	MCH	BRI	DAR	RCH	DOV	MAR	CLT	NWS	CAR	ATL		53rd	320	
1979	Williamson Racing	10	Olds																															ONT; 22	53rd	320	
1980	Jerry Cracker	5	Olds	RSD; Wth	DAY	RCH	CAR	ATL	BRI	DAR	NWS	MAR	TAL	NSV	DOV	CLT	TWS	RSD	MCH	DAY	NSV	POC	TAL	MCH	BRI	DAR	RCH	DOV	NWS	MAR	CLT	CAR	ATL	ONT	144th	NA	

==== Winston West Series ====
NASCAR Winston West Series results
Year	Team	No.	Make	1	2	3	4	5	6	7	8	9	10	11	12	13	14	15	16	17	18	19	20	21	22	NWWC	Pts	Ref
1978	Williamson Racing	10	Chevy	RSD	AAS	S99; 1*	SHA; 17	PET	MMR; 20	RSD	IFS	YAK	WSP	LSP	EVG	POR	CRS	ASP	**SON**; 6	SHA	CBS	YAK	OSS	ONT	PHO; 10	32nd	117	
1979	Williamson Racing	74	Chevy	RSD; 9																						2nd	743	
1979	Williamson Racing	10	Olds		MMR; 3		EVG; 8	YAK; 8	POR; 3	**AAS**; 1*	SHA; 3	CRS; 6	**SON**; 2*	EVG; 4	SPO; 7	POR; 5	ASP; 13		PHO; 4							2nd	743	
1979	Williamson Racing	29	Chevy			RSD; 26																				2nd	743	
1979	Williamson Racing	10	Chevy															ONT; 22								2nd	743	
1980	Jerry Cracker	5	Olds	RSD; Wth	ONT																					NA	NA	
1980	Williamson Racing	9	Olds			S99; Wth	RSD	LAG	EVG	POR	SON	MMR	ONT	PHO												NA	NA	
