= 1979 NASCAR Winston West Series =

26th season of the NASCAR Winston West Series

Seasons
- ← 1978 1980 →

The 1979 NASCAR Winston West Series was the 26th season of the series. The title was won by Bill Schmitt, his second in the series. He won the title by just 5 points over Tim Williamson.

== Teams and drivers ==
=== Complete schedule ===
Manufacturer	Team	No.	Driver
Oldsmobile 13 Chevrolet 3	Williamson Racing	10	Tim Williamson
Pontiac 13 Chevrolet 3	White Racing	2	Richard White
Pontiac 13 Oldsmobile 3	Gerald Craker	01	Jimmy Insolo
Pontiac 12 Oldsmobile 4	Schmitt Racing	73	Bill Schmitt

=== Partial schedule ===
Manufacturer	Team	No.	Driver	Races
Buick	Fox Garage Racing	09	Bob Fox	6
Buick	Thirkettle Racing	51	Jim Thirkettle	1
Buick	Unknown	37	Dave Watson	1
Chevrolet	A. J. Kurten	78	Jim Robinson (Note: Robinson ran the complete schedule split between A. J. Kurten's No. 78 and Arthur Godfrey's No. 81 entries.)	15
Chevrolet	Art Roth	47	Art Roth	1
Chevrolet	Baldwin Engineering	97	Bill Osborne	1
Chevrolet	Bob Davidson	8	Jackie Kuper	6
Chevrolet	Boyd Rollins	28	Frank Swords	4
Chevrolet	Chris Monoleos	92	Chris Monoleos	3
Chevrolet	Dick Whalen	6	Dick Whalen	4
Chevrolet	Don Guy Racing	57	Robert Tartaglia	13
Chevrolet	Hamby Motorsports	17	Steve Pfeifer	1
Chevrolet	Joiner Racing	26	Dan Joiner	1
Chevrolet	Kendall Buckstaff	92	Chris Monoleos	1
Chevrolet	Kennie Childers	72	Buck Simmons	2
Chevrolet	Kranzler Racing	14	Dick Kranzler	5
Chevrolet	Lillian Ward	60	Glen Ward	2
Chevrolet	Michael McCluney	0	Steve Pfeifer	2
Chevrolet	Noel Racing	99	Don Noel	1
Chevrolet	Pat Mintey	35	Pat Mintey	12
Chevrolet	Petty Enterprises	4	Kyle Petty	1
Chevrolet	Petty Enterprises	43	Richard Petty	4
Chevrolet	Phil Goulet	42	Phil Goulet	3
Chevrolet	Phil Goulet	42	Jim Bown	1
Chevrolet	Puskarich Racing	13	Don Puskarich	1
Chevrolet	Richard Peralta	20	Ed Hale	2
Chevrolet	Robertson Racing	25	Ronnie Thomas	4
Chevrolet	Rodney Friesen	52	Don Graham	1
Chevrolet	Rodney Friesen	52	Billy Clarkson	1
Chevrolet	Ron McGee	03	Ron McGee	2
Chevrolet	Stierly Racing	41	Ernie Stierly	3
Chevrolet	Thonesen Racing	77	Gene Thonesen	2
Chevrolet	Unknown	0	Lake Speed	1
Chevrolet	Unknown	4	Steve Rouse	1
Chevrolet	Unknown	06	Pappy Pryor	1
Chevrolet	Unknown	21	Ed McCoy	1
Chevrolet	Unknown	26	Mark Walbridge	2
Chevrolet	Unknown	33	Rudy Tomich	1
Chevrolet	Unknown	36	Doc Faustina	1
Chevrolet	Unknown	40	Bill Osborne	1
Chevrolet	Unknown	40	Andy Hall	1
Chevrolet	Unknown	50	Don Dupree	1
Chevrolet	Unknown	55	Ed Rains	1
Chevrolet	Waterman Racing	38	Don Waterman	1
Dodge	Davis Racing	22	St. James Davis	1
Dodge	Ernie Conn	05	Billy Conn	1
Dodge	Palmer Racing	93	Norm Palmer	3
Dodge	Richard Elder	88	Marc Vogel	4
Dodge	Stoke Racing	32	Ruben Garcia	2
Dodge	Stoke Racing	32	Ed Sauer	1
Dodge	Unknown	15	Glen Thorburn	2
Dodge	Unknown	21	Earle Canavan	1
Dodge	Unknown	80	Eddie Westwood	1
Dodge	Unknown	80	Ron Strmiska	1
Dodge	Walter Ross	32	Marc Vogel	1
Ford	Cook & Sons	12	David Pearson	1
Ford	Cook & Sons	12	Bobby Allison	1
Ford	Jack Malugani	90	Jack Malugani	3
Ford	Jefferson Racing	95	Harry Jefferson	3
Ford	Jefferson Racing	95	Hershel McGriff	1
Ford	Unknown	69	Stuart Lyndon	2
Matador	Bobby Allison Motorsports	12	Bobby Allison	1
Mercury	Cook & Sons	21	David Pearson	1
Oldsmobile	Hal Callentine	74	Hal Callentine	3
Oldsmobile	Reg Kennedy	84	Jim Hopkinson	3
Oldsmobile	Unknown	1	Joe Ruttman	1
Plymouth	Gary Henkel	04	Neal Newberry	5
Plymouth	Unknown	27	Jim Bown	4
Pontiac	Eaton Racing	7	Ron Eaton	5
Pontiac	Esau Racing	20	Ron Esau	3
Pontiac	Gary Matthews	51	Gary Matthews	1
Pontiac	Jack Jeffery	07	Jack Jeffery	5
Pontiac	Schmitt Racing	7	Neil Bonnett	1
Pontiac	Ted Armstrong	44	Gary Johnson	3
Pontiac	Unknown	19	LeRoy Anderson	3
Pontiac	Unknown	24	Kirk Rogers	1
Pontiac	Unknown	25	Bob Barker	1
Pontiac	Unknown	45	Leonard Sundholm	2
Pontiac	Unknown	98	Neil Feighner	1
Buick 5 Ford 1	John Krebs Racing	91	John Krebs	6
Chevrolet 1 Pontiac 1	Goularte Racing	17	Harry Goularte	2
Chevrolet 3 Pontiac 3	John Edgett	18	Rick O'Dell	6
Chevrolet 1 Pontiac 1	Unknown	1	Don Dowdy	2
Chevrolet 1 Pontiac 1	Unknown	51	Don Hume	2
Pontiac 11 Buick 4	McCray Racing	08	Rick McCray	15
Pontiac 4 Chevrolet 2	Arthur Godfrey	81	John Borneman	4
Pontiac 4 Chevrolet 2	Arthur Godfrey	81	Jim Robinson	1
Pontiac 4 Chevrolet 2	Arthur Godfrey	81	Bob Bondurant	1
Pontiac 3 Chevrolet 1	Bigelow Racing	02	Frank Bigelow	4
Pontiac 10 Chevrolet 1	Bishop Enterprises	96	Sharon Bishop	11
Pontiac 3 Chevrolet 2	Kieper Racing	98	Johnny Kieper	5
Pontiac 2 Chevrolet 1	Midgley Racing	29	Terry Forsythe	2
Pontiac 2 Chevrolet 1	Midgley Racing	29	Hershel McGriff	1
Pontiac 4 Chevrolet 1	Richard Bowman	4	Chuck Flora	5
Pontiac 8 Oldsmobile 1	Robert Beadle	11	Roy Smith	9

== Schedule and results ==
The 1979 season included 16 individual races, although Riverside International Raceway, Evergreen Speedway, and Yakima Speedway hosted two races each. The races at Riverside and the race at Ontario Motor Speedway were in combination with the NASCAR Winston Cup Series.

Date	Name	Racetrack	Location	Winner
January 14	Winston Western 500	Riverside International Raceway	Riverside, California	Darrell Waltrip
May 27	Winston Mesa Marin 100	Mesa Marin Raceway	Bakersfield, California	Bill Schmitt
June 10	NAPA Riverside 400	Riverside International Raceway	Riverside, California	Bobby Allison
June 24	Reed Cam 150	Evergreen Speedway	Monroe, Washington	Neal Newberry
June 30	Valley Ford 100	Yakima Speedway	Yakima, Washington	Ron Eaton
July 4	Kyte Coca-Cole 100	Rose City Speedway	Portland, Oregon	Roy Smith
July 20	Winston Roseville 100	All American Speedway	Roseville, California	Tim Williamson
July 21	Winston Shasta 100	Shasta Speedway	Anderson, California	Bill Schmitt
July 28	Winston Las Vegas 100	Craig Road Speedway	North Las Vegas, Nevada	Bill Schmitt
August 12	Winston Sears Point 100	Sears Point International Raceway	Sonoma, California	Jimmy Insolo
August 26	Evergreen Winston 100	Evergreen Speedway	Monroe, Washington	Ron Eaton
August 31	Spokane Winston 100	Spokane Raceway Park	Spokane, Washington	Jimmy Insolo
September 3	Rose City Winston 100	Rose City Speedway	Portland, Oregon	Ron Eaton
September 8	Winston Gardena 100	Ascot Park	Gardena, California	Bill Schmitt
November 18	Los Angeles Times 500	Ontario Motor Speedway	Ontario, California	Benny Parsons
November 25	NAPA Arizona 250	Phoenix International Raceway	Avondale, Arizona	Neil Bonnett

== Full Drivers' Championship ==
(key) Bold – Pole position awarded by time. Italics – Pole position set by owner's points. * – Most laps led. † – Ineligible for West Series points

Pos	Driver	RSD	MMR	RSD	EVG	YAK	POR	AAS	SHA	CRS	SON	EVG	SPO	POR	ASP	ONT	PHO	Pts
1	Bill Schmitt	4	1*	30	16*	4	23	3	1*	1	4	20	6	**2**	1	18	11	748
2	Tim Williamson	9	3	26	8	8	3	**1***	3	6	**2***	4	7	5	13	22	4	743
3	Jimmy Insolo	16	2	25	26	2	21	2	2	2	1	10	1*	3	14	36	30	699
4	Richard White	29	7	16	7	9	5	7	10	5	6	3	**8**	18	12*	30	10	691
5	Jim Robinson	30	15	21	5	11	18	5	11	4	19	9	14	9	**2**	32	28	643
6	Rick McCray	DNQ	10	27	25	6	7	4	8	**3***	21	8	11	22	4		22	621
7	Robert Tartaglia		17	24	13	16	12	12	13	12	9	23	10	15	5			498
8	Pat Mintey		12		12	12	10	11	7	8	28		18	19	10		18	447
9	Sharon Bishop				28	14	19	13	12	15	25		19	14	6		19	410
10	Roy Smith				4	19	1*				13	**7**	5	7		21	6	405
11	Jackie Kuper				2	3	2					2	4	8				285
12	Ron Eaton				6	1*						1*	9	1*				267
13	Rick O'Dell				14	15	13					11	3	4				246
14	Neal Newberry				1	**7**	4					5	16					232
15	Bob Fox				10	20	22					15	12	13				214
16	John Krebs	DNQ	21					17			14				7	DNQ		212
17	Johnny Kieper				3		**6**					22		16			9	199
18	Dick Kranzler		8	29						9					16	DNQ		193
19	Jack Jeffery					21			14			6	17	6				191
20	Chuck Flora		19		9	5	14					18						190
21	John Borneman		5	20						14							26	185
22	Marc Vogel		22					9	9		27						14	174
23	Frank Swords		4						5		10	12						173
24	Frank Bigelow		11					6	4	13								170
25	Jim Bown				**15**						24	14		11			23	168
26	Dick Whalen			19							12					DNQ	15	157
27	Chris Monoleos		16	34							11				8			154
28	Steve Pfeifer	DNQ									18						20	134
29	Hal Callentine										17					23	13	119
30	Phil Goulet					10	11							17				115
31	Jim Hopkinson							15			22				3			113
32	Ron Esau		**20**								15						12	106
33	Gary Johnson							14	15		23							101
34	Harry Jefferson				18	18						17						100
35	LeRoy Anderson				20							13		23				97
	Ernie Stierly				22	17	20											94
	Harry Goularte	23							**6**									90
	Norm Palmer			8												DNQ	27	84
	Stuart Lyndon		13							10								79
	Don Puskarich	28																79
	Glen Thorburn				11	13												78
	Ruben Garcia		9								20							73
	Jack Malugani							16	16		DNQ							70
	Don Noel	31																70
	Don Dowdy						24							10				68
	Gene Thonesen		18								16							68
	Don Hume						16					19						67
	Bill Osborne		6														29	67
	Terry Forsythe											21		21				60
	Leonard Sundholm				29							16						57
	Mark Walbridge				23												24	55
	Bobby Allison	19†		1†							5					2†	2	49
	Kirk Rogers												2					49
	Jim Thirkettle	8																49
	Ed Hale	DNQ		15														49
	Richard Petty	32†		3†												5†	**3***	48
	Dave Watson																5	46
	Don Graham	22																46
	Bob Barker									7								44
	Billy Clarkson										8							43
	Hershel McGriff						8									DNQ		43
	Kyle Petty															14†	8	43
	Ross Strmiska							8										43
	Andy Hall														9			42
	Don Waterman						9											42
	Billy Conn							10										41
	Ed Sauer														11			40
	Glen Ward			DNQ										12				39
	Eddie Westwood		14															37
	St. James Davis														15			36
	Don Dupree						15											36
	Buck Simmons															29	16	35
	Dan Joiner						17											34
	Art Roth				17													34
	Lake Speed															DNQ	17	34
	David Pearson	**2**†			19						3							32
	Earle Canavan																21	30
	Ed Rains				21													30
	Rudy Tomich				24													27
	Ronnie Thomas	12†		23†												27†	25	26
	Ron McGee			DNQ							26							25
	Pappy Pryor				27													24
	Neil Bonnett	34†		28†												6†	1	
	Bob Bondurant										7							
	Joe Ruttman			DC													7	
	Doc Faustina									11								
	Neil Feighner												13					
	Steve Rouse												15					
	Ed McCoy													20				
	Gary Mathews	DNQ																

== See also ==
- 1979 NASCAR Winston Cup Series
