= DiGard Motorsports =

NASCAR race team

DiGard Racing
- Owner(s): Mike DiProspero; Bill Gardner
- Base: Charlotte, North Carolina
- Series: Winston Cup
- Race drivers: Donnie Allison, Darrell Waltrip, Ricky Rudd, Bobby Allison
- Manufacturer: Chevrolet; Buick
- Opened: 1973
- Closed: 1987

Career
- Debut: 1973 Richmond 500 (Richmond)
- Latest race: 1987 First Union 400 (North Wilkesboro)
- Drivers' Championships: 1
- Race victories: 43

DiGard Racing was a championship-winning race team in the NASCAR Winston Cup Series that had its most success in the late 1970s and early 1980s. The team won the 1983 Winston Cup championship with Bobby Allison at the wheel.

The team was started in 1973 based in a racecar garage near the Daytona speedway. In its history, the team fielded cars for Donnie Allison in 1973 and 1974 before replacing him with Darrell Waltrip in August 1975. Waltrip posted the team's first win in October 1975 at Richmond Fairgrounds Raceway. In 1976 the team negotiated with Stokely-Van Camp's and acquired Gatorade sponsorship, but after a 1976 season where they won just one race and fell out of over ten races, the team opened a shop in Charlotte, NC and closed down the Daytona shop; with closer access to parts suppliers the team became a consistent winner in 1977.

But following the 1983 season where Bobby Allison won his and the team's only Winston Cup championship, the team fell from the top echelon of the sport and had its last Winston Cup start in 1987. Allison won twice in 1984, but the team struggled in 1985; when DiGard entered a second car at the 1985 Firecracker 400 and won under Greg Sacks, Allison quit the team. Robert Yates, who later founded his eponymous championship-winning NASCAR team, was an important member of the DiGard team as its primary engine builder from August 1976 to January 1986. Yates abruptly left DiGard in 1986 before the Daytona 500. Robin Pemberton also was part of the team.

== Opening history ==
The team was founded in part by Mike DiProspero and Bill Gardner, who were brothers-in-law. The team name came from combining their last names: DiProspero and Gardner. Donnie Allison, already established on the circuit, was their first driver. After failing to qualify for the 1973 Daytona 500, the team made its debut at the 1973 Richmond 500, finishing 25th.

Allison had an invested stock in the team, and at the 1974 Daytona 500 he led 41 laps but a backmarker's blown engine with eleven laps to go blew out both front tires; Donnie finished sixth. He won two poles and finished second at Nashville, but failed to finish eleven races; the 88 nonetheless ended 1974 finishing third at Martinsville, fourth after leading forty laps at Charlotte, and sixth at Rockingham.

The team held an open house for media at their Daytona shop before the 1975 500 and team president Bill Gardner stated the team had spent one million dollars in the 1973–74 seasons.

But the 1975 season began badly with another engine failure, this time in the 500. Donnie Allison managed only four top ten finishes in the first half of 1975 and in July that year Donnie Allison was let go, Jim Gardner - Bill's brother and the team's secretary-treasurer) - was given more authority in running the team. Darrell Waltrip was named the new driver.

== The No. 88 Gatorade car and Darrell Waltrip ==
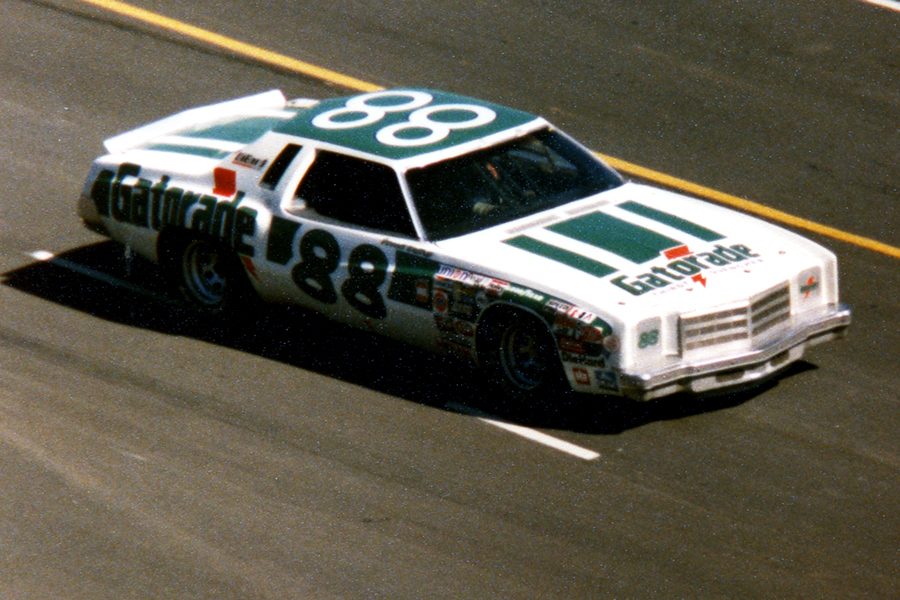
DiGard Gatorade Chevrolet Monte Carlo that Waltrip drove to victory in the 1978 World 600, Concord, NC, May 28, 1978

Waltrip drove twelve of the last thirteen races in the 1975 season, posting the team's first victory, at Richmond. The Gatorade brand then signed on board as a sponsor beginning in 1976. For the 1976 season Waltrip won at Martinsville and posted ten other top five finishes but only finished fourteen times. Long time crew chief Mario Rossi and engine men Carroll “Stump” Davis and Keith Harlan were fired that August, and engine builders Marion “Ducky” Newman and Robert Yates were hired.

The team moved to a new Charlotte shop before the 1977 season and surged to the fore of NASCAR, winning the Rebel 500 and the Winston 500 in dramatic fashion. Waltrip posted six wins in 1977, four of them on superspeedways. He posted six more wins in 1978, but this time four of his wins came on short tracks. Waltrip became disenchanted with team ownership and publicly stated he would join the Ranier Racing team then driven by Lennie Pond. Team owner Bill Gardner, however, refused to let Waltrip out of his contract, and driver and ownership met to iron out their differences. To the surprise of the sport's followers, Waltrip signed a four-year contract with DiGard before the 1979 season.

Waltrip nearly won the 1979 championship, coming second and losing by 11 points to Richard Petty in the championship. Waltrip and DiGard had led for most of the season that year, leading the championship by a wide margin until the last races.

The impact of the loss angered Waltrip and his contract situation with the team became an issue again. Darrell attempted to sign a contract with Penske Enterprises to drive for them, but the deal fell through after Roger Penske was told of Waltrip's agreement with DiGard. Crew chief Buddy Parrott was fired at the end of 1979 but then rehired in 1980. Waltrip and Parrott won four of the 1980 season's first sixteen races but was fired in June; Parrott finished the season with the Ranier team.

By the time autumn 1980 had happened, Waltrip had several engine failures that put him out of sight of a championship. He constantly blamed the team in the press for his struggles to progress to a higher level, comparing himself to the Iranian hostages. He also publicly said he would never win a championship as long as he drove for them. The team responded by alleging that Waltrip purposely overdrove some of their engines, costing them their chances at the title, and vowing that if performance did not improve, they would put Waltrip in their secondary car to Don Whittington until his 5-year contract ran out. During the 1980 season, several key team members made an exodus from the team, tired of the constant drama between driver and ownership. Gatorade was not too pleased with the controversies surrounding the team, putting DiGard in a win-or-die situation.

Looking to get out, Waltrip set up his own contract buyout out of his own pocket to leave DiGard, landing at Junior Johnson Racing. Waltrip would later say in a 2020 podcast with Jayski.com that the team was a championship-caliber team and the employees were great people. However, he "wasn't happy" working for them and that "it wasn't anybody's fault. We just weren't meant for each other." Gardner, in an interview with the same podcast, would say in response that the team was willing to let Waltrip move on, but he was trying to leave the team in a way that was unfair for the team's sponsor, and the contract he signed required a financial settlement if he was going to move on; once that happened, "we let him go."

=== No. 88 car post-Darrell Waltrip ===
The No. 88 Gatorade car was driven by Ricky Rudd for 1981, garnering three pole positions that season. Rudd posted fourteen top five finishes but failed to win.

Bobby Allison, who had been recruited by the team years before, joined the team in 1982. He exploded to eight victories in 1982 and finished second to Darrell Waltrip in the points championship. During this season, Allison encountered the same money problems in the team that Waltrip had witnessed; he signed a new contract with DiGard in large part thinking it would get him back payments the team had withheld during the season. In spite of his differences with leadership, Allison would win the 1983 Winston Cup championship after barely having a slightly better season than former driver, Waltrip. It was both DiGard and Allison's first championship in NASCAR competition.

For 1983 the Gatorade colors adorned a new Chevrolet Monte Carlo, but just before the season Miller High Life beer sponsorship joined the team and the car number was changed to No. 22. Gatorade and the number 88 then switched to Cliff Stewart's Pontiac and driver Geoff Bodine.

== The No. 22 Miller car and Bobby Allison ==
Allison raced with the team, driving the Miller High Life car, and won the 1983 NASCAR Winston Cup championship, which would end up being their only title. He began driving Chevrolets in the first three races; in March, the team was denied access to nose pieces for their Monte Carlos as the Junior Johnson team was given primary access to parts. The team switched to Buicks it had run the previous season. In all, the No. 22 won six races in the 1983 season.

But the team's finances continued to deteriorate. Allison won twice in 1984, but the team was inconsistent; it was involved supplying engines to the Curb Racing team driven by Richard Petty and the two teams were at loggerheads over provision of engines and payments; the team's deal with Curb ended after the 1984 Firecracker 400.

The team entered a second car, for Greg Sacks, for the 1985 Firecracker 400. In what was a huge upset for the sport, Sacks won the race, but the entry of two cars violated Allison's contract with the team. The win resulted in Allison's departure, and was the beginning of the end for the team's time in Winston Cup competition.

== 1985 Firecracker 400 win ==
In 1985, DiGard had Allison battling for the championship in the No. 22 Miller High Life car. For the Firecracker 400 at Daytona, DiGard set up and raced what is called a Research & Development car (a one-off unsponsored car numbered 10 entered to a race primarily for team improvement) with Greg Sacks at the helm. Instead of simply doing its intended purpose — running a small number of laps and collecting data about the track that DiGard could use for Allison's car — Sacks drove the car to an unexpected victory. It was later alleged that the car snuck through inspection with an oversized engine, and thus the team cheated. NASCAR did not find anything wrong with the No. 10 in post-race inspection, however, and Sacks' win stood.

The impact of the R&D car's victory was significant. Reportedly angered that the team was focusing its attention elsewhere, Allison, who had won the 1983 championship driving for the team, quit and Sacks was hired to race for the rest of the year, but did not capture another Top-5 finish in 1985. Allison went on to drive for Stavola Brothers Racing and took the Miller sponsorship with him following the season.

== End in NASCAR ==
The allegations of cheating — combined with reported money troubles — shook the team, and some say imploded it. Bobby Allison left the team midseason in 1985, engine builder Robert Yates left during the 1986 season, and the team ran a limited schedule and a myriad of drivers during their final seasons.

The team's last NASCAR Winston Cup entry was in 1987 with Rodney Combs. The team's final three starts were with Combs early in the 1987 season, including entries without sponsorship.

During that offseason, Keene, New Hampshire businessman Bob Whitcomb bought the assets and the points to the team and rechristened it as Bob Whitcomb Racing.

Bill Gardner today is a part of an effort to make a racetrack in Oregon a success. His brother, Jim Gardner, died. Mike DiProspero died in 2017 following a lengthy illness.

== Team statistics ==
=== Main Car results ===
NASCAR Winston Cup Series results
Year	Driver	No.	Make	1	2	3	4	5	6	7	8	9	10	11	12	13	14	15	16	17	18	19	20	21	22	23	24	25	26	27	28	29	30	31	Owners	Pts
1973	Donnie Allison	59	Chevy	RSD	DAY; DNQ	RCH; 25	CAR	BRI; 24	ATL	NWS; 9	DAR																								35th	1755.75
1973	Donnie Allison	88	Chevy									MAR; 27				DOV; 38	TWS	RSD	MCH; 7	DAY; 28	BRI	ATL; 3	TAL; 26	NSV	DAR	RCH	DOV; 12	NWS	MAR; 34	CLT; 32	CAR; 6				35th	1755.75
1973	Donnie Allison	08	Chevy										TAL; 2	NSV	CLT																				35th	1755.75
1974	Donnie Allison	88	Chevy	RSD; 6	DAY; 6	RCH; 17	CAR; 27	BRI; 5	ATL; 5	DAR; 4	NWS; 7	MAR; 23	TAL; 36	NSV; 2	DOV; 30	CLT; 30	RSD	MCH; 20	DAY; 33	BRI	NSV	ATL; 30	POC	TAL; 40	MCH	DAR	RCH	DOV; 31	NWS	MAR; 3	CLT; 4	CAR; 6	ONT		17th	728.8
1975	Donnie Allison	88	Chevy	RSD	DAY; 28	RCH	CAR; 28	BRI	ATL; 6	NWS	DAR; 3	MAR; 21	TAL; 42	NSV	DOV; 28	CLT; 9	RSD	MCH; 35	DAY; 5	NSV	POC														22nd	2236
1975	Darrell Waltrip	88	Chevy																			TAL; 42	MCH; 7	DAR; 34	DOV; 27	NWS; 3	MAR; 17	CLT; 24	RCH; 1	CAR; 32	BRI; 3	ATL; 36	ONT		22nd	2236
1976	Darrell Waltrip	88	Chevy	RSD; 21	DAY; 32	CAR; 2	RCH; 24	BRI; 2	ATL; 5	NWS; 22	DAR; 31	MAR; 1*	TAL; 33	NSV; 12	DOV; 30	CLT; 11	RSD; 6	MCH; 29	DAY; 39	NSV; 3	POC; 26	TAL; 37	MCH; 27	BRI; 3	DAR; 3	RCH; 4	DOV; 31	MAR; 2	NWS; 24	CLT; 11	CAR; 3	ATL; 7	ONT; 40		8th	3505
1977	Darrell Waltrip	88	Chevy	RSD; 9	DAY; 7	RCH; 2	CAR; 2	ATL; 7	NWS; 7	DAR; 1	BRI; 19	MAR; 21	TAL; 1	NSV; 3	DOV; 4	CLT; 6	RSD; 26	MCH; 35	DAY; 2	NSV; 1	POC; 3	TAL; 22	MCH; 1	BRI; 2	DAR; 6*	RCH; 7	DOV; 5	MAR; 10	NWS; 1	CLT; 5	CAR; 3	ATL; 1	ONT; 29		4th	4498
1978	Darrell Waltrip	88	Chevy	RSD; 23	DAY; 28	RCH; 4	CAR; 21	ATL; 35	BRI; 1	DAR; 2	NWS; 1*	MAR; 1*	TAL; 22	DOV; 6*	CLT; 1*	NSV; 26	RSD; 16	MCH; 28*	DAY; 3	NSV; 2	POC; 1*	TAL; 34	MCH; 3	BRI; 3	DAR; 2	RCH; 1	DOV; 5	MAR; 2	NWS; 2*	CLT; 2	CAR; 3	ATL; 28	ONT; 5		3rd	4362
1979	Darrell Waltrip	88	Chevy	RSD; 1*		CAR; 17	RCH; 3	ATL; 3	NWS; 5	BRI; 3	DAR; 1*	MAR; 3		NSV; 21	DOV; 18	CLT; 1*	TWS; 1*	RSD; 2	MCH; 13		NSV; 1*	POC		MCH; 19	BRI; 1	DAR; 11*	RCH; 2	DOV; 29	MAR; 11	CLT; 3	NWS; 13	CAR; 6	ATL; 5	ONT; 8	2nd	4819
1979	Darrell Waltrip	88	Olds		DAY; 2								TAL; 2							DAY; 4			TAL; 1*												2nd	4819
1980	Darrell Waltrip	88	Chevy	RSD; 1*		RCH; 1*	CAR; 4	ATL; 28	BRI; 2	DAR; 4	NWS; 12	MAR; 1*		NSV; 4	DOV; 20	CLT; 2*	TWS; 4	RSD; 1	MCH; 26		NSV; 4	POC; 26			BRI; 3	DAR; 25*	RCH; 6	DOV; 1*	NWS; 2	MAR; 21	CLT; 18	CAR; 3	ATL; 26	ONT; 25*	5th	4239
1980	Darrell Waltrip	88	Olds		DAY; 40								TAL; 42							DAY; 31			TAL; 11	MCH											5th	4239
1981	Ricky Rudd	88	Chevy	RSD; 19																	NSV; 4	POC; 6		MCH; 3	BRI; 2	DAR; 23	RCH; 12	DOV; 5	MAR; 8	NWS; 25	CLT; 3	CAR; 18			6th	3988
1981	Ricky Rudd	88	Olds		DAY; 3	RCH; 2	CAR; 31		BRI; 2				TAL; 4				TWS; 24			DAY; 40															6th	3988
1981	Ricky Rudd	88	Buick					ATL; 22		NWS; 6	DAR; 11	MAR; 3		NSV; 5*	DOV; 5	CLT; 4		RSD; 5	MCH; 30				TAL; 23										ATL; 38	RSD; 40	6th	3988
1982	Bobby Allison	88	Buick	DAY; 1*			ATL; 22					TAL; 13			CLT; 3	POC; 1*		MCH; 4	DAY; 1*		POC; 1		MCH; 1*		DAR; 20		DOV; 10		CLT; 9*			ATL; 1*			2nd	4417
1982	Bobby Allison	88	Chevy		RCH; 8	BRI; 5		CAR; 4	DAR; 25	NWS; 8	MAR; 17		NSV; 6	DOV; 1*			RSD; 27			NSV; 19				BRI; 2*		RCH; 1*		NWS; 23		MAR; 19	CAR; 2*				2nd	4417
1982	Bobby Allison	88	Pontiac																			TAL; 10											RSD; 16		2nd	4417
1983	Bobby Allison	22	Chevy	DAY; 9	RCH; 1	CAR; 10																													1st	4667
1983	Bobby Allison	22	Buick				ATL; 25	DAR; 8	NWS; 2	MAR; 3	TAL; 10	NSV; 2	DOV; 1*	BRI; 2	CLT; 3*	RSD; 22	POC; 1*	MCH; 2	DAY; 14	NSV; 4	POC; 3*	TAL; 9*	MCH; 34	BRI; 3	DAR; 1*	RCH; 1*	DOV; 1*	MAR; 2	NWS; 3	CLT; 7	CAR; 16	ATL; 3*	RSD; 9		1st	4667
1984	Bobby Allison	22	Buick	DAY; 34	RCH; 30	CAR; 1	ATL; 5	BRI; 19	NWS; 22	DAR; 20	MAR; 4*	TAL; 4	NSV; 12	DOV; 12	CLT; 1*	RSD; 3	POC; 7	MCH; 6	DAY; 4	NSV; 5	POC; 28	TAL; 4	MCH; 11	BRI; 2	DAR; 10	RCH; 25	DOV; 36	MAR; 23	CLT; 10	NWS; 3	CAR; 5	ATL; 5	RSD; 7*		6th	4094
1985	Bobby Allison	22	Buick	DAY; 33	RCH; 16	CAR; 31	ATL; 5	BRI; 13	DAR; 10	NWS; 3	MAR; 4	TAL; 4	DOV; 13	CLT; 3	RSD; 3	POC; 9	MCH; 6	DAY; 18																	14th	3284
1985	Greg Sacks	77	Buick																POC; 34	TAL; 15	MCH; 33	BRI; 28	DAR; 35	RCH; 20	DOV; 29	MAR; 14	NWS; 16	CLT; 11	CAR; 10	ATL; 9	RSD; 21				14th	3284
1986	Greg Sacks	10	Pontiac	DAY; 35	RCH; 19	CAR; 37						TAL; 10	DOV																						40th	631
1986	Greg Sacks	10	Chevy				ATL; 25	BRI	DAR	NWS	MAR			CLT; 39	RSD	POC	MCH	DAY; 39	POC	TAL	GLN	MCH; 38	BRI	DAR	RCH	DOV	MAR	NWS	CLT						40th	631
1986	Trevor Boys	10	Chevy																											CAR; 37					40th	631
1986	Jeff Swindell	10	Chevy																												ATL; 31	RSD			40th	631
1987	Rodney Combs	10	Olds	DAY; 19	CAR	RCH	ATL																												35th	1098
1987	Rodney Combs	10	Chevy					DAR; 37	NWS; 20	BRI	MAR	TAL	CLT	DOV	POC	RSD	MCH	DAY	POC	TAL	GLN	MCH	BRI	DAR	RCH	DOV	MAR	NWS	CLT	CAR	RSD	ATL			35th	1098

=== R&D Car results ===
NASCAR Winston Cup Series results
Year	Driver	No.	Make	1	2	3	4	5	6	7	8	9	10	11	12	13	14	15	16	17	18	19	20	21	22	23	24	25	26	27	28	29	30	31	Owners	Pts
1975	Johnny Rutherford	08	Chevy	RSD	DAY; 27	RCH	CAR	BRI	ATL	NWS	DAR	MAR	TAL	NSV	DOV	CLT	RSD	MCH	DAY	NSV	POC	TAL	MCH	DAR	DOV	NWS	MAR	CLT	RCH	CAR	BRI	ATL	ONT		NA	-
1980	Don Whittington	55	Chevy	RSD; 9	DAY; DNQ	RCH	CAR	ATL	BRI	DAR	NWS	MAR	TAL	NSV	DOV	CLT	TWS	RSD	MCH	DAY	NSV	POC	TAL	MCH	BRI	DAR	RCH	DOV	NWS	MAR	CLT	CAR	ATL	ONT	41st	67
1983	Jimmy Insolo	12	Buick	DAY	RCH	CAR	ATL	DAR	NWS	MAR	TAL	NSV	DOV	BRI	CLT	RSD	POC	MCH	DAY	NSV	POC	TAL	MCH	BRI	DAR	RCH	DOV	MAR	NWS	CLT	CAR	ATL	RSD; 42		104th	37
1985	Greg Sacks	10	Chevy	DAY	RCH	CAR	ATL	BRI	DAR	NWS	MAR	TAL	DOV	CLT	RSD	POC	MCH	DAY; 1	POC	TAL															47th	401
1985	Dick Trickle	10	Pontiac																		MCH; 8	BRI	DAR	RCH	DOV	MAR	NWS								47th	401
1985	Ken Ragan	10	Ford																									CLT; 28	CAR	ATL	RSD				47th	401
1986	Willy T. Ribbs	30	Chevy	DAY	RCH	CAR	ATL	BRI; DNQ	DAR	NWS; 22	MAR	TAL	DOV	CLT; DNQ			MCH; 39	DAY	POC	TAL	GLN; 37	MCH	BRI	DAR	RCH	DOV	MAR	NWS	CLT						65th	219
1986	Willy T. Ribbs	64	Chevy												RSD; 29	POC																			65th	219
1986	Jeff Swindell	30	Chevy																											CAR; DNQ	ATL	RSD			65th	219
