= 1978 Los Angeles Times 500 =

Auto race held at Ontario Motor Speedway in 1978

Race details
- Race 30 of 30 in the 1978 NASCAR Winston Cup Series season
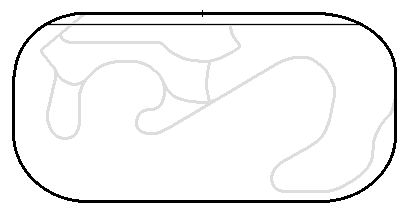
- Date: November 19, 1978
- Official name: Los Angeles Times 500
- Location: Ontario Motor Speedway, Ontario, California
- Course: Permanent racing facility
- Course length: 4.023 km (2.500 miles)
- Distance: 200 laps, 500 mi (804 km)
- Average speed: 137.783 miles per hour (221.740 km/h)
- Attendance: 50,905

Pole position
Driver	Cale Yarborough	Junior Johnson & Associates

Most laps led
Driver	Bobby Allison	Bud Moore Engineering
- Laps: 134

Winner
No. 15	Bobby Allison	Bud Moore Engineering

Television in the United States
- Network: CBS
- Announcers: Ken Squier and David Hobbs

The 1978 Los Angeles Times 500, the 7th running of the event, was the thirtieth race of the 1978 NASCAR Winston Cup season. It was held on November 19 at Ontario Motor Speedway in Ontario, California. Cale Yarborough won the pole and Bobby Allison won the race.

== Starting Grid ==
Row	Inside	Outside
1	(United States) 11-Cale Yarborough	(United States) 15-Bobby Allison W
2	(United States) 43-Richard Petty	(United States) 88-Darrell Waltrip
3	(United States) 1-Donnie Allison	(United States) 21-David Pearson W
4	(United States) 72-Benny Parsons	(United States) 27-Buddy Baker W
5	(United States) 54-Lennie Pond	(United States) 98-Jimmy Insolo
6	(United States) 90-Dick Brooks	(United States)
7	(United States)	(United States)
8	(United States)	(United States) 51-Jim Thirkettle
9	(United States)	(United States)
10	(United States)	(United States)
11	(United States) 5-Neil Bonnett W	(United States)
12	(United States)	(United States)
13	(United States) 17-Roger Hamby R	(United States)
14	(United States)	(United States)
15	(United States)	(United States)
16	(United States)	(United States) 25-Ronnie Thomas R
17	(United States)	(United States)
18	(United States)	(United States)
19	(United States)	(United States)
20	(United States)	(United States)

== Race results ==
Finish	Start	No	Name	Team	Manufacturer	Qual	Laps	Time/Status	Money ($)	Points
1	2	15	(United States) Bobby Allison W	Bud Moore Engineering	Ford	155.574	200	3:37:44	24,025	185
2	1	11	(United States) Cale Yarborough	Junior Johnson & Associates	Oldsmobile	156.190	200	+1.70	19,700	175
3	5	1	(United States) Donnie Allison	Hoss Ellington	Chevrolet	154.384	200	+20.0	12,925	170
4	8	27	(United States) Buddy Baker	M. C. Anderson	Chevrolet	153.670	199	Flagged (-1 lap)	8,600	160
5	4	88	(United States) Darrell Waltrip	DiGard Motorsports	Chevrolet	154.440	199	Crash	9,200	160
6	9	54	(United States) Lennie Pond	Ranier Racing	Chevrolet	153.620	198	Flagged (-2 laps)	7,140	155
7	10	98	(United States) Jimmy Insolo	Rod Osterlund	Chevrolet	153.173	198	Flagged (-2 laps)	5,640	146
8	7	72	(United States) Benny Parsons	DeWitt Racing	Chevrolet	154.064	197	Flagged (-3 laps)	7,040	147
9	11	90	(United States) Dick Brooks	Donlavey Racing	Mercury	152.785	196	Flagged (-4 laps)	5,040	138
10	16	51	(United States) Jim Thirkettle	Jim Thirkettle	Buick	150.978	196	Flagged (-4 laps)	3,740	139

W Former Los Angeles Times 500 winner

R Rookie

=== Race statistics ===
Lap Leaders
Laps	Leader
1–2	Bobby Allison
6	Lennie Pond
14	Bobby Allison
16	Jim Thirkettle
19	Benny Parsons
20	Donnie Allison
21–42	Bobby Allison
48–49	Bobby Allison
53–56	Darrell Waltrip
57–69	Bobby Allison
78–80	Bobby Allison
84–88	Cale Yarborough
89–96	Darrell Waltrip
97–111	Bobby Allison
112	Darrell Waltrip
113–149	Bobby Allison
150–152	Cale Yarborough
153–172	Bobby Allison
173	Donnie Allison
174–178	Bobby Allison
179–186	Cale Yarborough
187–200	Bobby Allison

Total laps led
Driver	Laps
Bobby Allison	134
Cale Yarborough	16
Darrell Waltrip	9
Donnie Allison	2
Benny Parsons	1
Lennie Pond	1
Jim Thirkettle	1

Caution Periods
4 for 17 laps
Laps	Reason

== Standings after the race ==
Pos	Driver	Points	Differential
1	Cale Yarborough	4841	0
2 ▲	Bobby Allison	4367	-474
3 ▼	Darrell Waltrip	4362	-479
4 ▼	Benny Parsons	4350	-491
7	Lennie Pond	3794	-1047
8	Dick Brooks	3769	-1072

== Broadcasting ==
=== Television ===
CBS Sports
Booth Announcers	Pit/garage reporters
Announcer: Ken Squier; Color: David Hobbs	Brock Yates

Preceded by 1978 Dixie 500	NASCAR Winston Cup Series Season; 1978-79	Succeeded by 1979 Winston Western 500

Preceded by 1977	Los Angeles Times 500 races 1978	Succeeded by 1979
