= Bill Osborne (racing driver) =

American racing driver (1946–2009)

- Born: Bill Jack Osborne; November 24, 1946; Rialto, California, U.S.
- Died: August 29, 2009 (aged 62)

NASCAR Cup Series career
- 13 races run over 8 years
- Best finish: 60th (1985)
- First race: 1971 Miller High Life 500 (Ontario)
- Last race: 1986 Budweiser 400 (Riverside)
Wins	Top tens	Poles
0	0	0

ARCA Menards Series West career
- 31 races run over 10 years
- Best finish: 7th (1985)
- First race: 1971 Miller High Life 500 (Ontario)
- Last race: 1986 Budweiser 400 (Riverside)
Wins	Top tens	Poles
0	9	0
- Statistics up to date as of November 9, 2026.

Bill Jack Osborne (November 24, 1946 – August 29, 2009) was an American professional stock car racing driver. He competed in the NASCAR Winston Cup Series and NASCAR Winston West Series between 1971 and 1986.

== Racing career ==
Osborne simultaneously made his NASCAR Winston Cup Series and NASCAR Winston West Series debut in the 1971 Miller High Life 500 at Ontario Motor Speedway, a combination race between the series, where he finished 46th of 51 cars due to engine issues; he made another combination race start at Riverside International Raceway, finishing 26th due to engine issues, and a standalone Winston West start at Orange Show Speedway, finishing eighteenth due to a crash.

Osborne's lone NASCAR start of 1972 came in the 1972 Miller High Life 500 at Ontario, where he finished 46th due to A-frame issues; he failed to qualify for the season opener at Riverside.

Osborne competed in at least 24 NASCAR Late Model Sportsman National Championship races in 1973, all at San Gabriel Valley Speedway and Orange Show, finishing in the top-ten in all recorded starts, including 21 top-fives.

Osborne made three Winston West starts in 1974, finishing 26th and 28th in combination races at Riverside and Ontario respectively and 22nd at San Gabriel. In eleven recorded Late Model Sportsman races, he scored eight wins.

In 1975, Osborne ran the first five Winston West races of the season, scoring his first career top-ten and top-five at Laguna Seca Raceway with a fifth-place finish. These included two Riverside combination races, where he finished sixteenth in the season opener and 26th in the second race at the track, falling out with engine issues in both events. He finished 33rd in a Late Model Sportsman race at Riverside.

Osborne attempted the 1976 Los Angeles Times 500 at Ontario but failed to qualify. He finished fifth in the first Late Model Sportsman race of the year at Riverside.

Osborne made two Winston West starts in 1977, both at Ontario; he finished eighteenth due to overheating issues in the standalone race and 23rd in the combination race.

Osborne competed in a NASCAR Grand American Stock Car National Championship race at Ontario in 1978, finishing eighth.

Osborne ran two Winston West races in 1979, finishing sixth at Mesa Marin Raceway and 29th at Phoenix International Raceway due to an oil leak. He made his lone USAC Stock Car Series start at Ontario, finishing tenth. Osborne also attempted two Western States Open Competition Series races, finishing 21st at Saugus Speedway and failing to qualify at Craig Road Speedway.

In 1980, Osborne's lone Winston West start was the season-opening Riverside combination race, where he finished last in 37th due to rear end issues; he also made his lone Winston Cup standalone start at North Carolina Motor Speedway, finishing 35th due to a crash 22 laps into the event.

Osborne competed in the 1982 Copper World Classic at Phoenix, finishing thirteenth.

Osborne next competed in NASCAR in 1984, finishing 23rd in the Winston West season finale at Phoenix due to engine issues; he failed to qualify for a combination race at Riverside.

Osborne ran his only full-time Winston West season in 1985, scoring seven top-tens, five of them top-fives, across eleven races, scoring a best finish of third at Northwest Speedway. He finished a career-best seventh in the standings. Osborne finished 21st and 24th in the combination races at Riverside.

Osborne simultaneously made his final Winston Cup and Winston West start in the 1986 Budweiser 400 at Riverside, where he finished 35th due to engine issues. He made his lone career NASCAR Featherlite Southwest Tour start at Riverside, finishing eleventh.
