= 1984 Firecracker 400 =

Auto race held at Daytona International Speedway in 1984

Race details
- Race 16 of 30 in the 1984 NASCAR Winston Cup Series season
- 1984 Firecracker 400 program cover
- Date: July 4, 1984
- Official name: Firecracker 400
- Location: Daytona Speedway. Daytona Beach, Florida
- Course: Permanent racing facility
- Course length: 2.500 miles (4.000 km)
- Distance: 160 laps, 400 mi (643 km)
- Weather: Very hot with temperatures of 87.1 °F (30.6 °C) with 0.47 inches (12 mm) of rain reported within 24 hours of the race; wind speeds of 11.1 miles per hour (17.9 km/h)
- Average speed: 171.204 miles per hour (275.526 km/h)
- Attendance: 80,000

Pole position
| Driver | Cale Yarborough | Ranier-Lundy Racing |

Most laps led
| Driver | Cale Yarborough | Ranier-Lundy Racing |
- Laps: 79

Winner
| No. 43 | Richard Petty | Curb Racing |

Television in the United States
- Network: ABC
- Announcers: Jim Lampley; Sam Posey

The 1984 Firecracker 400 was a NASCAR Winston Cup Series racing event that took place on July 4, 1984, at Daytona International Speedway in Daytona Beach, Florida.

Richard Petty, driving the #43 Pontiac for Curb Racing, won the race. The victory gave Petty his 200th win in NASCAR Winston Cup Series competition, extending his longstanding record. It was also his final race victory before his 1992 retirement. The race was also notable for U.S. President Ronald Reagan's attendance. The race was held on a Wednesday. The next NASCAR race held on Wednesday would not happen again until 2020.

== Racing summary ==
The "Start your engines" command was given by President Ronald Reagan from the phone on Air Force One, which later landed at Daytona Beach International Airport. President Reagan then was escorted to one of the main press boxes at the speedway where he was met by a number of reporters, one of them being Ned Jarrett, who offered him to do some play-by-play commentary on MRN.

Of forty-two drivers on the grid, forty-one were born in the United States of America while Canadian Trevor Boys was the event's lone non-American entrant.

There were three cautions for fifteen laps and the race ended under caution. Dean Roper would make his final NASCAR Winston Cup Series start in this event. Dale Earnhardt would take over the championship lead from Darrell Waltrip at the end of the race.

An audience of 80,000 people attended the race.

Richard Petty indisputably had the best car in that race until his camshaft broke (which also happened to the DiGard car driven by Bobby Allison, which also had a Robert Yates engine in it). In that race, Petty drove from 34th into the lead in just 50 laps without hardly any help from the caution flag, and by lap 60, Richard was breaking away from the field when the caution flew for Bobby Hillin's blown engine. And then after a series of pit stops dropped him back, Richard passed Cale handily, which virtually no other car on the track at that point in the race could do, and was leading when his camshaft broke on the 93rd lap. Cale could have passed Richard any time he wanted to, but he wanted to stay in second and draft by on the final lap, just as he had done to win the previous two Daytona 500 races.

Notable entrants in the race included Geoff Bodine, Ricky Rudd, David Pearson, Dale Jarrett (his first start on a superspeedway), Rusty Wallace, Kyle Petty, Buddy Baker, Sterling Marlin, Tim Richmond, and Darrell Waltrip.

=== Media coverage ===
ABC Sports carried the race on American television on a tape-delayed basis on ABC's Wide World of Sports. Jim Lampley provided the lap-by-lap call with Sam Posey as the analyst with Larry Nuber covering the action in the pits.

Radio coverage was provided by MRN with Eli Gold, Ned Jarrett, and Barney Hall in the booth with Mike Joy reporting from the track. After President Reagan's arrival at the track, he joined the MRN crew in the booth for a brief period.

=== The finish ===
On lap 158 of 160, Richard Petty and Cale Yarborough, driving the #28 Chevrolet for Ranier-Lundy Racing, were battling for the lead. While this was going on, Doug Heveron wrecked the #01 Chevrolet in turn one. The caution flag came out, and the leaders raced back to the caution. Under NASCAR rules at the time, the caution period did not begin until the leaders received the yellow flag at the start/finish line. Petty and Yarborough battled down the backstretch and through turns three and four. Even though there were still two laps to go, whichever car crossed the start/finish line first would effectively be the race winner. There would not be sufficient time to clean up the crash, and go back to green, so the race was destined to finish under the caution. Petty managed to beat Yarborough to the line by a nose, and after circulating the final two laps behind the pace car, took the race win.

Yarborough did not finish second, however, as he accidentally pulled off track one lap too early. He raced off of pit road to rejoin the field, but not before he was passed by Harry Gant in the #33 Chevrolet. Yarborough admitted after the race "my brain blew up".

After taking a victory lap, Petty got out of his car and began heading up toward the suite level of the track where the President had been watching the race to greet him.

=== Results ===
| POS | ST | # | DRIVER | SPONSOR / OWNER | CAR | LAPS | MONEY | STATUS | LED | PTS |
|---|---|---|---|---|---|---|---|---|---|---|
| 1 | 6 | 43 | Richard Petty | STP (Mike Curb) | Pontiac | 160 | 43755 | running | 53 | 180 |
| 2 | 13 | 33 | Harry Gant | Skoal Bandit (Hal Needham) | Chevrolet | 160 | 25570 | running | 4 | 175 |
| 3 | 1 | 28 | Cale Yarborough | Hardee's (Harry Ranier) | Chevrolet | 160 | 23640 | running | 79 | 175 |
| 4 | 10 | 22 | Bobby Allison | Miller High Life (DiGard Racing) | Buick | 160 | 21850 | running | 5 | 165 |
| 5 | 9 | 55 | Benny Parsons | Copenhagen (Johnny Hayes) | Chevrolet | 160 | 10450 | running | 0 | 155 |
| 6 | 3 | 9 | Bill Elliott | Coors (Harry Melling) | Ford | 160 | 14050 | running | 0 | 150 |
| 7 | 4 | 44 | Terry Labonte | Piedmont Airlines (Billy Hagan) | Chevrolet | 159 | 11975 | running | 11 | 151 |
| 8 | 2 | 3 | Dale Earnhardt | Wrangler Jeans (Richard Childress) | Chevrolet | 159 | 13600 | running | 5 | 147 |
| 9 | 19 | 12 | Neil Bonnett | Budweiser (Junior Johnson) | Chevrolet | 159 | 7665 | running | 0 | 138 |
| 10 | 18 | 98 | Joe Ruttman | Levi Garrett (Ron Benfield) | Chevrolet | 157 | 9255 | running | 0 | 134 |
| 11 | 41 | 27 | Tim Richmond | Old Milwaukee (Raymond Beadle) | Pontiac | 157 | 11350 | running | 0 | 130 |
| 12 | 26 | 5 | Geoffrey Bodine | Northwestern Security Life (Rick Hendrick) | Chevrolet | 157 | 10850 | running | 0 | 127 |
| 13 | 15 | 66 | Phil Parsons | Skoal Bandit (Johnny Hayes) | Chevrolet | 157 | 6485 | running | 0 | 124 |
| 14 | 7 | 4 | Tommy Ellis | Morgan-McClure (Larry McClure) | Chevrolet | 157 | 3950 | running | 0 | 121 |
| 15 | 22 | 15 | Ricky Rudd | Wrangler Jeans (Bud Moore) | Ford | 156 | 11950 | running | 0 | 118 |
| 16 | 38 | 48 | Trevor Boys | Hylton-McCaig (James Hylton) | Chevrolet | 156 | 7725 | running | 0 | 115 |
| 17 | 5 | 16 | David Pearson | Chattanooga Chew (Bobby Hawkins) | Chevrolet | 156 | 3400 | running | 1 | 117 |
| 18 | 23 | 75 | Dave Marcis | Coca-Cola (Rahmoc Enterprises) | Pontiac | 156 | 11250 | running | 0 | 109 |
| 19 | 17 | 84 | Jody Ridley | Cumberland Carpet Mills (Robert McEntyre) | Chevrolet | 155 | 2950 | running | 0 | 106 |
| 20 | 14 | 88 | Rusty Wallace | Gatorade (Cliff Stewart) | Pontiac | 155 | 6015 | running | 0 | 103 |
| 21 | 32 | 89 | Dean Roper | Tiki Tan (Mueller Brothers) | Pontiac | 155 | 2650 | running | 0 | 100 |
| 22 | 28 | 71 | Mike Alexander | Action Vans (Dave Marcis) | Oldsmobile | 155 | 5255 | running | 0 | 97 |
| 23 | 39 | 52 | Dale Jarrett | Broadway Motors (Jimmy Means) | Pontiac | 155 | 4955 | running | 0 | 94 |
| 24 | 35 | 64 | Tommy Gale | Sunny King Ford & Honda (Elmo Langley) | Ford | 153 | 4625 | running | 0 | 91 |
| 25 | 20 | 17 | Clark Dwyer | Hesco Exhaust Systems (Roger Hamby) | Chevrolet | 152 | 4615 | running | 0 | 88 |
| 26 | 24 | 77 | Ken Ragan | McCord Gaskets (Marvin Ragan) | Chevrolet | 152 | 2250 | running | 0 | 85 |
| 27 | 33 | 6 | Connie Saylor | U.S. Racing (D.K. Ulrich) | Chevrolet | 150 | 4330 | running | 0 | 82 |
| 28 | 40 | 01 | Doug Heveron | Syracuse Classic (Tom Heveron) | Chevrolet | 145 | 1950 | crash | 0 | 79 |
| 29 | 25 | 41 | Ronnie Thomas | Thomas Racing (Ronnie Thomas) | Chevrolet | 139 | 4160 | running | 0 | 76 |
| 30 | 16 | 7 | Kyle Petty | 7-Eleven (Petty Enterprises) | Ford | 130 | 10250 | engine | 2 | 78 |
| 31 | 12 | 11 | Darrell Waltrip | Budweiser (Junior Johnson) | Chevrolet | 126 | 10225 | running | 0 | 70 |
| 32 | 34 | 97 | Dean Combs | Best Products (Irv Sanderson) | Chevrolet | 115 | 1700 | trail arm | 0 | 67 |
| 33 | 30 | 95 | Sterling Marlin | Sadler Racing (Sadler Brothers) | Chevrolet | 76 | 2675 | engine | 0 | 64 |
| 34 | 27 | 47 | Ron Bouchard | Hawaiian Punch (Jack Beebe) | Buick | 56 | 3150 | carburetor | 0 | 61 |
| 35 | 37 | 73 | Steve Moore | Reagan in '84 (Steve Moore) | Chevrolet | 53 | 1625 | push rod | 0 | 58 |
| 36 | 42 | 67 | Buddy Arrington | Jim Peacock Dodge (Buddy Arrington) | Chrysler | 41 | 3075 | engine | 0 | 55 |
| 37 | 29 | 8 | Bobby Hillin, Jr. | Trap Rock Industries (Stavola Brothers) | Chevrolet | 40 | 1550 | crash | 0 | 52 |
| 38 | 21 | 90 | Dick Brooks | Chameleon Sunglasses (Junie Donlavey) | Ford | 26 | 3725 | transmission | 0 | 49 |
| 39 | 31 | 51 | Greg Sacks | Native Tan (Arnie Sacks) | Chevrolet | 15 | 1550 | ignition | 0 | 46 |
| 40 | 36 | 23 | Morgan Shepherd | Cap'n Coty's (Dick Bahre) | Chevrolet | 6 | 1500 | engine | 0 | 43 |
| 41 | 8 | 21 | Buddy Baker | Valvoline (Wood Brothers) | Ford | 4 | 1500 | engine | 0 | 40 |
| 42 | 11 | 1 | Lake Speed | Bull Frog Knits (Hoss Ellington) | Chevrolet | 0 | 1500 | engine | 0 | 37 |

== Post-race ==
A fight between Pearson and Richmond broke out in the garage after the race. Pearson managed to punch Richmond below the left eye before crew members of both teams and NASCAR officials broke the fight. While it was unclear what triggered the fight, it was reported that Pearson's car leaked oil on the track after blowing a head gasket and Richmond made an obscene gesture at him.

At 3:00 p.m., President Reagan joined Petty and other drivers for a Kentucky Fried Chicken and Pepsi picnic. During the picnic, country singer Tammy Wynette stood arm-in-arm with the President on stage while singing "Stand by Your Man".

== Controversies ==
Rumors later circulated that Petty's engine in the race was illegal, a controversy revived during Speedweeks 1995 when Autoweek magazine published a story alleging certain levels of favoritism by NASCAR officials over the years. The engine was built by DiGard Racing as part of a lease deal with Curb Motorsports, and on race morning there had been a dispute between the two teams over the lateness of payments; Richard Petty himself offered to cover whatever payments had been missed. Though rumors about the legality of the engine had circulated, especially in the ensuing year's Firecracker 400 when another DiGard engine was claimed to be oversized, the claims were later denied by NASCAR and the consensus of evidence is that the engine was legal. In both cases, future NASCAR Hall of Fame inductee Robert Yates (Class of 2018) was the engine builder for DiGard.

Also, because of the 1971 Myers Brothers 250, there is a technical dispute whether this is Petty's 200th or 201st win. The 1971 race at Bowman Gray Stadium in Winston-Salem, North Carolina was a combination race with Grand American and Grand National cars, Petty had finished second in a Grand National car to a Grand American car (Bobby Allison, driving a Mustang) that won the race; under current NASCAR rules for combination races, and in motorsport for races involving multiple divisions of cars racing at the same time, both division winners would be credited a win for their division. No win was credited in the Grand National division, and if guidelines for combination races were used then, Petty would be credited with a win (at any rate, Allison was only credited with the win in 2024).

Conspiracy theories

Rival driver Cale Yarborough's premature retirement to the pit road has prompted conspiracy theorists to allege that organizers fixed the race in order to receive good publicity for the event. Yarborough was a part-time driver, and Harry Gant (who inherited second) was a full-time Cup driver.

Nearly ten years later, a similar incident with Yarborough's occurred. On April 9, 1994, during the second-tier series (currently the O'Reilly Auto Parts Series) Goody's 250 at Bristol Motor Speedway, Mark Martin was leading when a late-race safety car on Lap 246 of 250 meant the race would end under the safety car. After leading 195 of the 249 laps, Martin prematurely turned to pit lane exiting Turn 4 on the final lap, allowing David Green (a full-time second-tier driver) to take the chequered flag and win the race for his only win in that year's second-tier series. Green won the championship that year, meaning had Martin not gone to pit road, he would have been the champion without any wins.

== Standings after the race ==
| Pos | Driver | Points | Differential |
|---|---|---|---|
| 1 | Dale Earnhardt | 2359 | 0 |
| 2 | Darrell Waltrip | 2307 | -52 |
| 3 | Bill Elliott | 2304 | -55 |
| 4 | Terry Labonte | 2293 | -66 |
| 5 | Harry Gant | 2229 | -130 |
| 6 | Bobby Allison | 2210 | -149 |
| 7 | Ricky Rudd | 2138 | -221 |
| 8 | Neil Bonnett | 2100 | -259 |
| 9 | Richard Petty | 2076 | -283 |
| 10 ▲ | Geoffrey Bodine | 2019 | -340 |

| Preceded by 1984 Miller High Life 400 | NASCAR Winston Cup Season; 1984 | Succeeded by 1984 Pepsi 420 |
| Preceded by 1984 Budweiser 500 | Richard Petty's Career Wins; 1960-1984 | Succeeded by Last win of his career (retired after the end of the 1992 Hooters 500 race) |
