= Dura Lube =

American automotive lubricant company

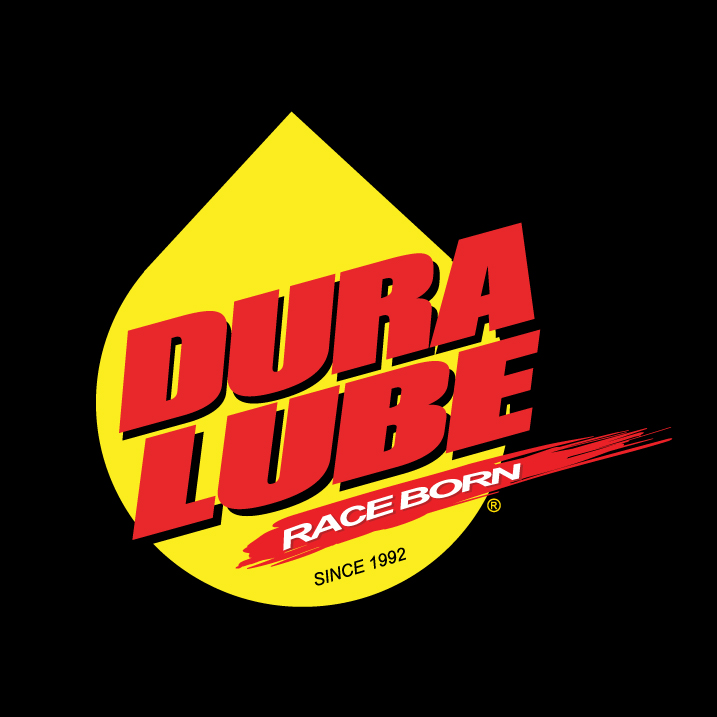
- Type: Corporation
- Industry: Automotive lubricants
- Founded: 1986
- Headquarters: Gahanna, Ohio, USA
- Key people: William Beichner (CEO)
- Website: http://www.duralube.com

The Dura Lube Corporation is an American company formed in 1986, originally marketing an engine additive for heavy duty trucks. The company gained wide exposure in the mid-1990s through infomercials and wide retail distribution of its engine and fuel additives.

== Products ==
Today, the company provides engine treatment products for gas and diesel applications and produces various engine, fuel, and transmission treatment products, as well as industrial grease and exterior appearance products. It offers its products online and through big box retailers like Walmart and major automotive dealers like AutoZone, Advance Auto Parts, O'Reilly Auto Parts and Pep Boys. The company was founded in 1986 and is based in Gahanna, Ohio. As of its acquisition on June 24, 2005, Dura Lube Corporation operates as a subsidiary of Into Great Brands Inc.

== Additive controversy ==
Dura Lube was heavily marketed in the 1990s via television infomercials and print advertising. The company's advertising at that time made certain specific claims that provided quantitative performance comparisons of oils treated with company's product to untreated oils. In a case filed in 1999, the Federal Trade Commission proved that the company did not have a reasonable basis to substantiate these claims based upon available testing.

=== Settlement ===
The company along with several others including Valvoline Engine Treatment, Slick 50 Engine Treatment, STP Engine Treatment, and Motor Up Corporation, was investigated by the Federal Trade Commission in 1999-2000 and was found to have no competent or reliable evidence substantiating these claims about its performance. In March 2000, Dura Lube and competitor Motor Up both settled Federal Trade Commission charges that performance claims for their engine treatments were deceptive and unsubstantiated. The two settlements barred false and unsubstantiated claims about the performance, benefits, efficacy, or attributes of these products. In addition, As one of several industry companies penalized by the FTC, Dura Lube paid $2 million in consumer redress to be distributed by the FTC. The FTC had previously halted allegedly deceptive ads for Prolong Engine Treatment, Valvoline Engine Treatment, Slick 50 Engine Treatment and STP Engine Treatment.

=== Ownership ===
As a result, the original ownership filed bankruptcy and the company assets were sold to a venture capital group in Columbus Ohio named Into Great Brands Inc.
