= 1980 Talladega 500 =

Auto race held at Alabama International Motor Speedway in 1980

Race details
- Race 20 of 31 in the 1980 NASCAR Winston Cup Series season
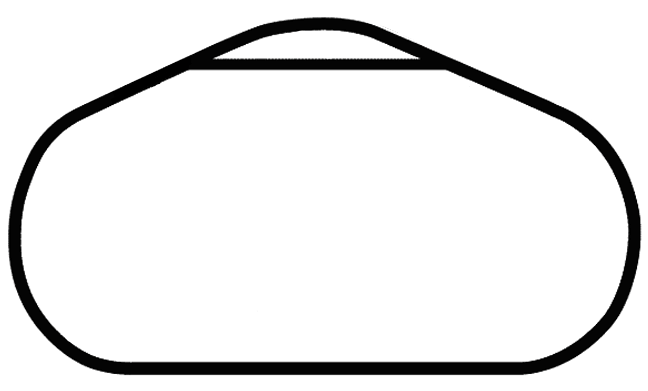
- Layout of Talladega Superspeedway
- Date: August 3, 1980
- Official name: Talladega 500
- Location: Alabama International Motor Speedway, Talladega, Alabama
- Course: Permanent racing facility
- Course length: 4.280 km (2.660 miles)
- Distance: 188 laps, 500.1 mi (804.8 km)
- Weather: 97.9 °F (36.6 °C); wind speeds of 11.8 miles per hour (19.0 km/h)
- Average speed: 166.894 miles per hour (268.590 km/h)
- Attendance: 70,000

Pole position
Driver	Buddy Baker	Ranier Racing

Most laps led
Driver	Buddy Baker	Ranier Racing
- Laps: 56

Winner
No. 21	Neil Bonnett	Wood Brothers Racing

Television in the United States
- Network: CBS
- Announcers: Ken Squier; Ned Jarrett

The 1980 Talladega 500 was a NASCAR Winston Cup Series race that took place on August 3, 1980, at Alabama International Motor Speedway in Talladega, Alabama, USA.

== Background ==
Talladega Superspeedway, originally known as Alabama International Motor Superspeedway (AIMS), is a motorsports complex located north of Talladega, Alabama. It is located on the former Anniston Air Force Base in the small city of Lincoln. The track is a Tri-oval and was constructed by International Speedway Corporation, a business controlled by the France Family, in the 1960s. Talladega is most known for its steep banking and the unique location of the start/finish line - located just past the exit to pit road. The track currently hosts the NASCAR series such as the Sprint Cup Series, Xfinity Series, and the Camping World Truck Series. Talladega Superspeedway is the longest NASCAR oval with a length of 2.66 miles (4.28 km), and the track at its peak had a seating capacity of 175,000 spectators.

== Race report ==
The race consisted of 188 laps for a total of 500.1 miles (804.8 km). The race took two hours and fifty-nine minutes in complete. Neil Bonnett defeated Cale Yarborough by six car lengths in front of 70000 spectators. Five cautions slowed the field for 25 laps while the average speed was 166.894 miles per hour (268.590 km/h).

Buddy Baker would qualify for the pole with a speed of 198.545 miles per hour (319.527 km/h). Bruce Hill would finish last due to an engine issue on lap 12. There were a lot of failures in the race as seven of the top ten starters all blew engines; the last top ten starting driver would end his day on lap 174.

Hill would make $1,050 in race winnings ($4,007 when adjusted for inflation) while Bonnett would earn $35,675 ($136,144 when adjusted for inflation).

Mercury would score its last NASCAR Cup victory in this race. Coo Coo Marlin would retire from NASCAR after this race while Tennessee's Harry Dinwiddle would make his only NASCAR Cup Series appearance here. Country music singing legend and NASCAR Cup Series driver Marty Robbins would start 37th and finish the race in 13th while driving his 1978 Dodge Magnum number 6.

=== Qualifying ===
Grid	No.	Driver	Manufacturer	Owner
1	28	Buddy Baker	Oldsmobile	Harry Ranier
2	21	Neil Bonnett	Mercury	Wood Brothers
3	11	Cale Yarborough	Oldsmobile	Junior Johnson
4	30	Tighe Scott	Oldsmobile	Walter Ballard
5	43	Richard Petty	Oldsmobile	Petty Enterprises
6	68	Lennie Pond	Oldsmobile	Jim Testa
7	88	Darrell Waltrip	Oldsmobile	DiGard
8	27	Benny Parsons	Oldsmobile	M.C. Anderson
9	12	Donnie Allison	Oldsmobile	Kennie Childers
10	1	David Pearson	Oldsmobile	Hoss Ellington

== Finishing order ==
Section reference:

1. Neil Bonnett†
2. Cale Yarborough
3. Dale Earnhardt†
4. Benny Parsons†
5. Harry Gant
6. Richard Childress
7. Bill Elliott
8. Lake Speed
9. Kyle Petty
10. Dick May†
11. Darrell Waltrip*
12. Hary Dinwiddle
13. Marty Robbins†
14. James Hylton†
15. Jimmy Means
16. Billie Harvey*†
17. David Pearson*†
18. Richard Petty*
19. Slick Johnson†
20. Ricky Rudd
21. Ronnie Thomas*
22. Roger Hamby
23. Cecil Gordon†
24. Bobby Wawak†
25. J.D. McDuffie*†
26. Donnie Allison*
27. Baxter Price
28. Lennie Pond*†
29. Tommy Gale*†
30. Jody Ridley*
31. Terry Labonte*
32. Buddy Baker*†
33. Frank Warren*
34. Tighe Scott*
35. Bobby Allison*
36. Rick Wilson*
37. Coo Coo Marlin*†
38. Buddy Arrington*
39. Dave Marcis*
40. Ferrel Harris*†
41. Bruce Hill*

† signifies that the driver is known to be deceased
* Driver failed to finish race

== Standings after the race ==
Pos	Driver	Points	Differential
1	Dale Earnhardt	3072	0
2	Cale Yarborough	2902	-150
3	Richard Petty	2872	-200
4	Benny Parsons	2787	-285
5	Darrell Waltrip	2709	-363

Preceded by 1980 Coca-Cola 500	NASCAR Winston Cup Series Season; 1980	Succeeded by 1980 Champion Spark Plug 400

Preceded by 1979	Talladega 500 races 1980	Succeeded by 1981
