= Robert Yates (NASCAR owner) =

NASCAR team owner

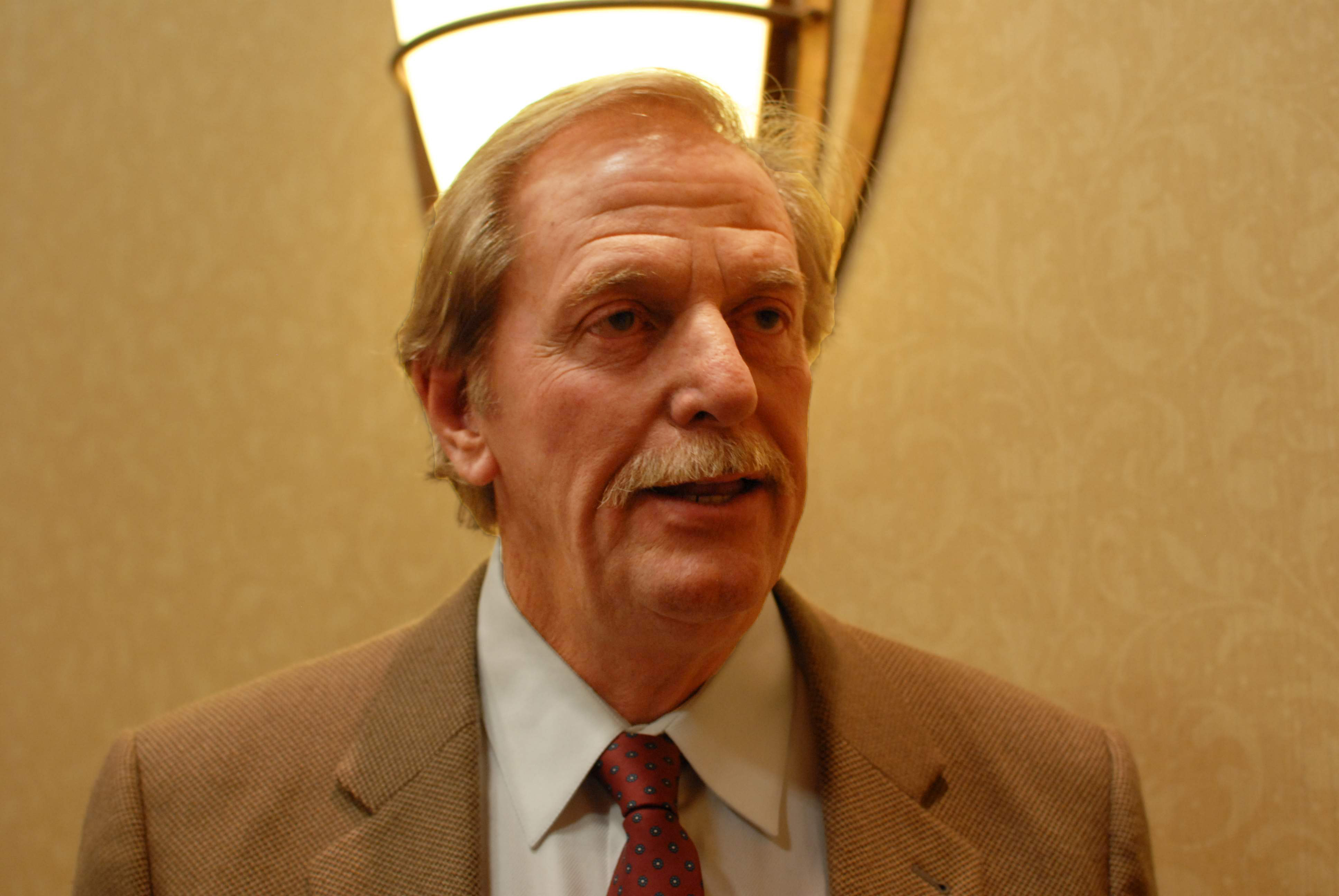
- Yates in 2010
- Born: James Robert Yates; April 19, 1943; Charlotte, North Carolina, U.S.
- Died: October 2, 2017 (aged 74); Cornelius, North Carolina, U.S.
- Occupations: Racing team owner Engine builder
- Spouse: Carolyn (née Helms)
- Children: 2

James Robert Yates (April 19, 1943 – October 2, 2017) was an American NASCAR engine builder and founder of the Winston Cup Series team Robert Yates Racing. He purchased the team from Harry Ranier in 1988, with driver Davey Allison. Yates owned the team until retiring at the end of the 2007 season with his son Doug assuming ownership and renaming the team Yates Racing. In 2018, Yates was inducted into the NASCAR Hall of Fame.

== Biography ==
The son of Rev. John Clyde Yates, he grew up as one of nine children in Charlotte, North Carolina. He has a twin brother, Richard.

As a youth, Yates raced his own dragster in the late 1950s. During his formative years, he moved to Wake Forest, North Carolina to live with his sister's family. In 1961, he graduated from Wake Forest High School a straight-A student. In 1964, Yates graduated from Wilson Technical College in North Carolina, earning a degree in mechanical engineering.

Yates joined Holman-Moody in 1968 as head of the air gauge department, and two years later, he was hired by Junior Johnson to manage his team's engine department. From 1976 to 1986, Yates was at DiGard Motorsports, where he was chief engine builder. During that time, Bobby Allison won the NASCAR Winston Cup Series title in 1983.

Yates left DiGard in 1986 to work on the development of synthetic fuels and, in the same year, returned to NASCAR as general manager of Ranier-Lundy Racing in August of that year. In 1988, he acquired the team to form Robert Yates Racing.

Yates died of cancer on October 2, 2017. The following year in 2018, Yates was inducted into the NASCAR Hall of Fame.

== Races ==
The team finished second in its first race, the 1988 Daytona 500, being edged by Allison's father and NASCAR legend Bobby Allison.

=== 1991 ===
In 1991, Larry McReynolds (now a NASCAR analyst with Fox Sports) joined Yates Racing as crew chief and led Davey Allison to five victories. In 1992, Yates Racing started the season with Allison winning the Daytona 500, joining his father Bobby, a three time Daytona 500 winner. The win also put the Allisons in an exclusive club, joining Lee and Richard Petty and later Dale Earnhardt and Dale Earnhardt Jr. as the only father/son winners of the Daytona 500.

=== 1992 ===
In 1992 Allison again had another dominant year winning five races again, despite a broken hand suffered at Pocono in June and a cracked rib. Allison also experienced a personal tragedy in August when his brother Clifford was killed in the Busch Series race at Michigan International Speedway. Going into the last race at Atlanta all Allison had to do was finish sixth or better to clinch the Winston Cup title, but a collision with Ernie Irvan on the 251st lap damaged Allison's car and knocked him from contention.

Allison completed 34 more laps and was running at the finish. With Allison eliminated from title contention it was down to a two-man race between Bill Elliott and Alan Kulwicki, Elliott won the race, but Kulwicki led one more lap than Elliott to win the title by ten points. Allison would finish third in the final points standings.

=== 1993 ===
In 1993 the team struggled, although Allison did win the Pontiac Excitement 400 at Richmond in March. They then experienced tragedy as Allison was killed in a helicopter crash in July. Ernie Irvan, who was driving for Morgan–McClure Motorsports, wanted to replace his friend and after several weeks Yates was able to bring him aboard. With Irvan behind the wheel the team won at Martinsville in a car set up by Allison, the team also won at Charlotte in the Mello Yello 500 when Irvan led all but six of the race's 334 laps.

=== 1994 ===
In 1994 the team got off to a fast start with Irvan finishing second to Sterling Marlin (which was Marlin's first win in 276 races) at the Daytona 500, two weeks later Irvan won at Richmond just like Allison did the year before, Irvan would follow that win up a week later by winning the Puralator 500 at Atlanta.

In May 1994 the team won at Sonoma, California. In August Irvan came within ten laps of winning the Inaugural Brickyard 400 at Indianapolis, before cutting a tire and handing the race to Jeff Gordon. Irvan was in contention for the Winston Cup title before he was critically injured in practice crash at Michigan a week later. Kenny Wallace finished out the year in the No. 28 Ford Thunderbird.

=== 1995 ===
With the team in need of a full-time replacement while Irvan was sidelined, Yates brought Dale Jarrett from Joe Gibbs Racing to drive the #28. Jarrett won at Pocono in July. In October Irvan returned to the track driving a second Yates car No. 88 in a race at North Wilkesboro, N.C. Irvan led six laps and finished sixth.

=== Expansion ===
In 1996 Yates expanded to two full-time teams with Irvan back behind the wheel of the No. 28 Ford and Dale Jarrett driving the No. 88 car. The new team wasted no time showing its muscle with Jarrett, under the leadership of rookie crewchief Todd Parrott won the Busch Clash at Daytona and the Daytona 500. Irvan secured the outside pole for the Daytona 500 alongside Dale Earnhardt who was in his eighteenth attempt to win the Daytona 500. Irvan also won his Gatorade Twin 125 Qualifying Race. Jarrett also won the Coca-Cola 600 at Charlotte and the Brickyard 400 and at Michigan in August and finished third in the final Winston Cup points standings behind Hendrick Motorsports teammates Terry Labonte (the Champion) and Jeff Gordon.

=== Later years ===
Yates was given his first championship as a NASCAR owner in 1999 with Dale Jarrett. His engines had won championships with him as an engine builder before, notably 1983 with Bobby Allison and DiGard Motorsports, and also with Darrell Waltrip.

After that season the team began to slump a little. Eddie D'Hondt joined the team as Manager after leaving Evernham Motorsports and the team seemed to be heading in the right direction with the hiring of Mike Ford. Ford hired several key members including Russ Salerno, as his Pit Crew Coordinator.

Shortly after that RYR found itself with a team that was improving and becoming a contender again. Elliott Sadler joined Robert Yates Racing for the 2003 season and won two races for Yates in 2004. As of July 2007, Yates' last win was with Dale Jarrett at Talladega Superspeedway in October 2005. Yates retired as a NASCAR Sprint Cup Team Owner after 2007, giving Yates Racing to his son, Doug. In 2010 he came out of retirement to form a new company, Robert Yates Racing Engines, with his son-in-law Chris Davy as his partner.

On May 24, 2017, Yates was voted into the NASCAR Hall of Fame's Class of 2018.

In November 2016, Yates began undergoing treatment for liver cancer. Yates said he was told by a doctor in early August to gather his family and make plans for hospice because “you’re done in four weeks.” Four hours later, Yates’ future looked much better. Another doctor told Yates that the terminal diagnosis was wrong. “I need both doctors, but I need a little cheerleading, too,’’ said the 74-year-old former team owner. On October 2, 2017, Yates died due to liver cancer.

In 2018, Yates was inducted into the NASCAR Hall of Fame.
