= 1983 Winston Western 500 =

Auto race held at Riverside International Raceway in 1983

Race details
- Race 30 of 30 in the 1983 NASCAR Winston Cup Series season
- 1983 Winston Western 500 program cover
- Date: November 20, 1983
- Official name: Winston Western 500
- Location: Riverside International Raceway, Riverside, California
- Course: Permanent racing facility
- Course length: 2.620 miles (4.345 km)
- Distance: 119 laps, 311.8 mi (501.7 km)
- Weather: Temperatures of 64.9 °F (18.3 °C); wind speeds of 8 miles per hour (13 km/h)
- Average speed: 95.859 miles per hour (154.270 km/h)
- Attendance: 24,000

Pole position
Driver	Darrell Waltrip	Junior Johnson & Associates

Most laps led
Driver	Darrell Waltrip	Junior Johnson & Associates
- Laps: 34

Winner
No. 9	Bill Elliott	Melling Racing

Television in the United States
- Network: WTBS
- Announcers: Ken Squier, Cale Yarborough

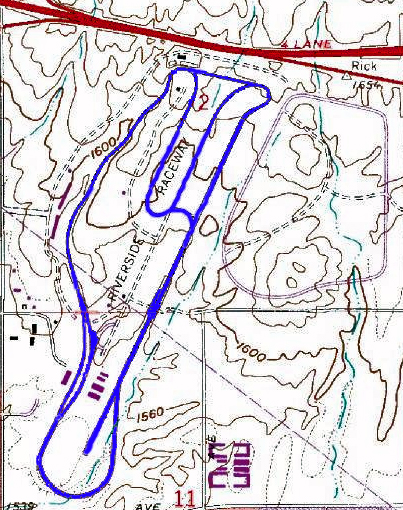
The layout of Riverside International Raceway (1969-1988 version), the venue where the race was held.

The 1983 Winston Western 500 was the thirtieth and final race of the 1983 NASCAR Winston Cup Series season. It took place on November 20, 1983, at Riverside International Raceway in Riverside, California.

== Qualifying ==
Pos.	#	Driver	Make	Team/Owner	Time	Avg. Speed (mph)
1	11	Darrell Waltrip	Chevrolet Monte Carlo	Junior Johnson & Associates		
2	3	Ricky Rudd	Chevrolet Monte Carlo	Richard Childress Racing		
3	44	Terry Labonte	Chevrolet Monte Carlo	Hagan Racing		
4	98	Joe Ruttman	Pontiac Grand Prix	Benfield Racing		
5	55	Benny Parsons	Chevrolet Monte Carlo	Johnny Hayes Racing		
6	22	Bobby Allison	Buick Regal	DiGard Motorsports		
7	33	Harry Gant	Buick Regal	Mach 1 Racing		
8	43	Richard Petty	Pontiac Grand Prix	Petty Enterprises		
9	15	Dale Earnhardt	Ford Thunderbird	Bud Moore Engineering		
10	9	Bill Elliott	Ford Thunderbird	Melling Racing		
11	75	Neil Bonnett	Chevrolet Monte Carlo	RahMoc Enterprises		
12	51	Scott Miller	Pontiac Grand Prix	Scott Miller		
13	93	Jim Bown	Buick Regal	Kieper Racing		
14	74	Roy Smith	Buick Regal	John Edgett		
15	21	Buddy Baker	Ford Thunderbird	Wood Brothers Racing		
16	47	Ron Bouchard	Buick Regal	Race Hill Farm Team		
17	78	Jim Robinson	Oldsmobile Cutlass	Lois Williams		
18	38	Don Waterman	Buick Regal	Don Waterman		
19	12	Jimmy Insolo	Buick Regal	DiGard Motorsports		
20	88	Donnie Allison	Pontiac Grand Prix	Cliff Stewart Racing		
21	90	Dick Brooks	Ford Thunderbird	Donlavey Racing		
22	04	Hershel McGriff	Buick Regal	Gary Smith		
23	48	Trevor Boys	Chevrolet Monte Carlo	Hylton Motorsports		
24	66	Ron Esau	Buick Regal	Lee Racing		
25	87	Randy Becker	Buick Regal	Randy Becker		
26	27	Tim Richmond	Pontiac Grand Prix	Blue Max Racing		
27	2	Morgan Shepherd	Buick Regal	Jim Stacy Racing		
28	08	Rick McCray	Pontiac Grand Prix	Rick McCray		
29	71	Dave Marcis	Oldsmobile Cutlass	Marcis Auto Racing		
30	73	Bill Schmitt	Chevrolet Monte Carlo	Bill Schmitt		
31	41	Ronnie Thomas	Pontiac Grand Prix	Ronnie Thomas		
32	7	Kyle Petty	Pontiac Grand Prix	Petty Enterprises		
33	03	Glenn Francis	Pontiac Grand Prix	Trent Francis		
34	64	D.K. Ulrich	Ford Thunderbird	Langley Racing		
35	83	Sumner McKnight	Chevrolet Monte Carlo	McKnight Racing		
36	91	John Krebs	Oldsmobile Cutlass	KC Racing		
37	67	Buddy Arrington	Dodge Mirada	Arrington Racing		
38	70	J.D. McDuffie	Pontiac Grand Prix	McDuffie Racing		
39	13	Doug Wheeler	Buick Regal	Puskarich Racing		
40	52	Jimmy Means	Chevrolet Monte Carlo	Jimmy Means Racing		
41	17	Sterling Marlin	Pontiac Grand Prix	Hamby Racing		
42	35	Pat Mintey	Chevrolet Monte Carlo	Pat Mintey		
Failed to qualify
	1	Mark Perry	Buick Regal	Dave Perry		
	02	St. James Davis		St. James Racing		
	6	Bobby Hillin Jr.		Ulrich Racing		
	8	Steve Pfeifer				
	17	Harry Goularte	Buick Regal	Goularte Racing		
	37	Dan Noble	Buick Regal	Noble Racing		
	58	Tony Settember				
	94	Bob Kennedy				

== Race recap ==
There were 42 drivers; 40 of them were American-born while Roy Smith and Trevor Boys were born in Canada.

Ricky Rudd started on the front row (second place) but retired from the lead with a blown engine in his last outing for Richard Childress in the number 3 Piedmont Airlines Chevrolet. Dale Earnhardt would start his final NASCAR Winston Cup Series race in a Ford; bringing home Bud Moore's number 15 Wrangler Thunderbird with a top-5 finish. James "J.D." Stacy would mark his final race as an official NASCAR team owner at this race. Stacy came in with promises and a lot of cash but proved to be a charlatan. The Sterling Marlin and Trevor Boys battle for rookie of the year came down to the last race of the year with the Canadian Boys leading coming into the final race by approximately 16 points. Marlin came from behind to claim the honor after scoring a top-20 finish while mechanical problems in this final race doomed Boys' hopes.

Buddy Arrington was the 23rd-place finisher after dropping out of the race on lap 109 due to wheel issues in his Chrysler Cordoba. Sumner McKnight finished in 19th place after completing 114 of the regulation laps.

Bobby Allison secured his only Winston Cup Championship during the course of the race.

Jimmy Insolo, a West Series driver, drove a second car for DiGard Racing (which fielded Bobby Allison), as a start and park entry to help Allison's team (a common practice for the lead team to have the backup car prepared for a second driver in case their lead car failed, the driver can be changed before the start). It was pulled after one lap. Joe Ruttman blew his engine on lap 12 while Bill Schmidt would also have a blown engine on lap 13. Rick McCray's engine would expire on lap 29. Meanwhile, ignition problems would take out Ron Esau on lap 32 at the same time Ricky Rudd suffered from a faulty engine. The ignition on Roy Smith's vehicle stopped working on lap 36 while the throttle on Jim Bown's vehicle gave out on lap 37. Between lap 38 and lap 61, four drivers were forced to exit the race due to engine concerns.

Bill Elliott passed Benny Parsons on the Lap 115 restart that took place on the backstretch, taking the lead before the final safety car was called during Lap 117 for rain, meaning the cars would race back to the line (prohibited starting in 2003) and finished the final two laps under the safety car for a win in front of 24,000 spectators for his first-ever Cup Series victory. This was Elliott's first Cup win. Bill Elliott won this race driving a 1982 Ford Thunderbird as opposed to the slicker 1983 model; the team used the older car on road courses and short tracks this season to save costs and due to a parts shortage from Ford for the newest model. Elliott's first Cup and second-tier series wins were on road courses, as his first second-tier race win was at Watkins Glen International in 1993. In August 2018, his son Chase Elliott also scored his first Cup win, again on a former United States Grand Prix circuit, winning at Watkins Glen in 2018.

There were 13 lead changes and five caution flags for 26 laps; making the race last three hours and fifteen minutes. While the average speed of the race was 95.859 miles per hour (154.270 km/h), Darrell Waltrip qualified for the pole position with a speed of 116.782 miles per hour (187.942 km/h). The length of this race was 119 laps - the equivalent of 311.8 miles (501.8 km).

Jimmy Insolo, Doug Wheeler, Don Waterman, Pat Mintey, and Randy Becker would retire from NASCAR Cup Series racing after this event.

Drivers who failed to qualify were: Bobby Hillin Jr. (#6), Dan Noble (#37), Tony Settember (#58), Harry Goularte (#17), Steve Pfeifer (#8), St. James Davis (#02), Mark Perry (#1) and Bob Kennedy (#94).

This was the last race without Rusty Wallace until the 2006 Daytona 500.

== Results ==
Fin	St	#	Driver	Make	Team/Owner	Sponsor	Laps	Led	Status	Pts	Winnings
1	10	9	Bill Elliott	Ford Thunderbird	Melling Racing	Melling Oil Pumps	119	5	running	180	$26,380
2	5	55	Benny Parsons	Chevrolet Monte Carlo	Johnny Hayes Racing	Copenhagen	119	33	running	175	$13,225
3	11	75	Neil Bonnett	Chevrolet Monte Carlo	RahMoc Enterprises	Hodgdon	119	0	running	165	$18,375
4	9	15	Dale Earnhardt	Ford Thunderbird	Bud Moore Engineering	Wrangler	119	4	running	165	$13,725
5	26	27	Tim Richmond	Pontiac Grand Prix	Blue Max Racing	Old Milwaukee	119	31	running	160	$8,930
6	1	11	Darrell Waltrip	Chevrolet Monte Carlo	Junior Johnson & Associates	Pepsi, Burger King	119	34	running	160	$19,200
7	3	44	Terry Labonte	Chevrolet Monte Carlo	Hagan Racing	Budweiser	119	0	running	146	$6,100
8	22	04	Hershel McGriff	Buick Regal	Gary Smith	Mark C. Bloome	119	0	running	142	$4,700
9	6	22	Bobby Allison	Buick Regal	DiGard Motorsports	Miller High Life	119	1	running	143	$10,850
10	8	43	Richard Petty	Pontiac Grand Prix	Petty Enterprises	STP	118	10	running	139	$8,650
11	16	47	Ron Bouchard	Buick Regal	Race Hill Farm Team	Race Hill Farm	118	0	running	130	$5,030
12	29	71	Dave Marcis	Oldsmobile Cutlass	Marcis Auto Racing	Miller Brothers	118	0	running	127	$9,650
13	32	7	Kyle Petty	Pontiac Grand Prix	Petty Enterprises	7-Eleven	117	0	running	124	$4,620
14	20	88	Donnie Allison	Pontiac Grand Prix	Cliff Stewart Racing	Gatorade	117	0	running	121	$4,410
15	25	87	Randy Becker	Buick Regal	Randy Becker	Becker Trucking	116	0	running	118	$1,950
16	40	52	Jimmy Means	Chevrolet Monte Carlo	Jimmy Means Racing	Broadway Motors	115	0	running	115	$5,125
17	41	17	Sterling Marlin	Pontiac Grand Prix	Hamby Racing	Hesco Exhaust	115	0	running	112	$4,465
18	39	13	Doug Wheeler	Buick Regal	Puskarich Racing	W & W Machine	115	0	running	109	$2,755
19	35	83	Sumner McKnight	Chevrolet Monte Carlo	McKnight Racing	McKnight Racing	114	0	running	106	$2,415
20	15	21	Buddy Baker	Ford Thunderbird	Wood Brothers Racing	Valvoline	113	0	running	103	$1,675
21	17	78	Jim Robinson	Oldsmobile Cutlass	Lois Williams	Hammer Security	112	0	running	100	$2,305
22	12	51	Scott Miller	Pontiac Grand Prix	Scott Miller	MDB Systems	112	0	running	97	$1,575
23	37	67	Buddy Arrington	Dodge Mirada	Arrington Racing	Arrington Grocery	109	0	wheel	94	$3,195
24	23	48	Trevor Boys	Chevrolet Monte Carlo	Hylton Motorsports	Hylton-McCaig	101	0	drive line	91	$3,135
25	18	38	Don Waterman	Buick Regal	Don Waterman	St. John's Auto Parts	101	0	running	88	$1,425
26	34	64	D.K. Ulrich	Ford Thunderbird	Langley Racing	Sunny King	101	0	differential	85	$2,325
27	31	41	Ronnie Thomas	Pontiac Grand Prix	Ronnie Thomas	McCord Gaskets	96	0	differential	82	$1,275
28	33	03	Glenn Francis	Pontiac Grand Prix	Trent Francis	Francis Race Cars	89	0	shifter	79	$1,225
29	42	35	Pat Mintey	Chevrolet Monte Carlo	Pat Mintey	AFR Signs	73	0	engine	76	$1,175
30	38	70	J.D. McDuffie	Pontiac Grand Prix	McDuffie Racing	McDuffie Racing	66	0	rocker arm	73	$2,100
31	7	33	Harry Gant	Buick Regal	Mach 1 Racing	Skoal Bandit	61	0	engine	70	$8,925
32	36	91	John Krebs	Oldsmobile Cutlass	KC Racing	Coca-Cola	60	0	engine	67	$1,100
33	27	2	Morgan Shepherd	Buick Regal	Jim Stacy Racing	My Car	42	0	engine	64	$8,675
34	21	90	Dick Brooks	Ford Thunderbird	Donlavey Racing	Chameleon Sunglasses	38	0	engine	61	$2,050
35	13	93	Jim Bown	Buick Regal	Kieper Racing	Wholesale Truck Parts	37	0	throttle	58	$1,025
36	14	74	Roy Smith	Buick Regal	John Edgett	Edgett Excavating	36	0	ignition	55	$2,025
37	2	3	Ricky Rudd	Chevrolet Monte Carlo	Richard Childress Racing	Piedmont Airlines	32	1	running	57	$1,900
38	24	66	Ron Esau	Buick Regal	Lee Racing	McDonald's	32	0	ignition	49	$875
39	28	08	Rick McCray	Pontiac Grand Prix	Rick McCray	Coors	29	0	engine	46	$850
40	30	73	Bill Schmitt	Chevrolet Monte Carlo	Bill Schmitt	Mountain Dew	13	0	engine	43	$840
41	4	98	Joe Ruttman	Pontiac Grand Prix	Benfield Racing	Levi Garrett	12	0	engine	40	$1,840
42	19	12	Jimmy Insolo	Buick Regal	DiGard Motorsports	Miller High Life	1	0	handling	37	$840

== Final standings after the race ==
=== Drivers ===
Pos	Driver	Points	Difference
1	**Bobby Allison**	**4667**	0
2	Darrell Waltrip	4620	-47
3	Bill Elliott	4279	-388
4	Richard Petty	4025	-625
5	Terry Labonte	4004	-663
6	Neil Bonnett	4002	-665
7	Harry Gant	3790	-877
8 ▲	Dale Earnhardt	3732	-935
9 ▼	Ricky Rudd	3693	-974
10	Tim Richmond	3597	-1070

- **Bold** denotes the champion for the season.

=== Manufacturers ===
Chevrolet secured the title with a total of 15 wins and 20 poles over the thirty race season. Buick finished a distant second with 6 wins and 2 poles. Third place went to Ford with 4 wins and 1 pole. Pontiac was forth with 5 wins and 7 poles.

*Points scored by the manufacturers are not easily available but when they are found, will be added.

Preceded by 1983 Atlanta Journal 500	NASCAR Winston Cup Series Season; 1983-4	Succeeded by 1984 Daytona 500

Preceded by 1982	Winston Western 500 races 1983	Succeeded by 1984
