= 1979 Winston Western 500 =

Auto race held at Riverside International Raceway in 1979

Race details
- Race 1 of 31 in the 1979 NASCAR Winston Cup Series season
- Souvenir magazine cover of the 1979 Winston Western 500
- Date: January 14, 1979
- Official name: Winston Western 500
- Location: Riverside International Raceway, Riverside, California
- Course: Permanent racing facility
- Course length: 2.62 miles (4.216 km)
- Distance: 119 laps, 311.8 mi (501.7 km)
- Weather: Cold with temperatures of 60.1 °F (15.6 °C); wind speeds of 9.9 miles per hour (15.9 km/h)
- Average speed: 107.820 miles per hour (173.519 km/h)
- Attendance: 68,000

Pole position
Driver	David Pearson	Wood Brothers

Most laps led
Driver	Darrell Waltrip	DiGard
- Laps: 87

Winner
No. 88	Darrell Waltrip	DiGard

Television in the United States
- Network: Untelevised
- Announcers: None

The 1979 Winston Western 500 was a NASCAR Winston Cup Series racing event that took place on January 14, 1979, at Riverside International Raceway in Riverside, California. Buying a souvenir program at this race was relatively inexpensive for the era at $2 USD per copy ($8.87 when adjusted for inflation).

By the following season, NASCAR had completely stopped tracking the year model of all the vehicles and most teams did not take stock cars to the track under their own power anymore. Only manual transmission vehicles were allowed to participate in this race; a policy that NASCAR has retained to the present day.

== Summary ==
This race was Williamson's Cup Series debut. He died in a racing accident the following year during the running of a Grand American series race. This race was the final caution-free race in NASCAR road course history; bringing the idea of a "perfect game" to an end. The final oval course race that went the entire distance without a single caution flag would be the 2002 EA Sports 500; which was won by Dale Earnhardt Jr. of Dale Earnhardt, Inc.

During the 1970s, Riverside International Raceway had its configurations modernized in order to create the fast-paced racing that the public started to demand for after engine technology picked up during the 1960s. NASCAR would develop a liking for mile and a half tracks by the 2014 NASCAR Sprint Cup Series season; with Sonoma and Watkins Glen serving as the sole road course tracks.

There were 35 American-born male drivers on the grid; Terry Labonte received the last-place finish due to an engine issue on lap 7 out of 119. Darrell Waltrip defeated David Pearson by 3.27 seconds in front of 68,000 live audience members. Waltrip would get his first-ever Cup road course victory; going on to win five times in total at Riverside.

Drivers who failed to qualify were Gary Matthews (#51), Ed Hale (#20), Steve Pfeifer (#0), John Krebs (#91) and Rick McCray (#08).

Although there were no cautions in this "perfect game," there were still 13 lead changes and the race lasted two hours and fifty-three minutes. While Pearson would clinch the pole position with an average speed of 113.659 miles per hour (182.916 km/h), the average speed of the race was 107.820 miles per hour (173.519 km/h). The other drivers in the top ten were: Cale Yarborough, Bill Schmitt, Donnie Allison, Joe Millikan, Buddy Baker, Jim Thirkettle, Tim Williamson, and Harry Gant.

This was Richard Petty's first race after he had some serious stomach surgery during the offseason. There was concern he might not be able to go the distance this soon after that treatment and his former teammate Hershel McGriff was lined up as the possible relief driver. McGriff was supposed to run this race in James Hylton's #48 Chevrolet but he moved over to standby duty with Hylton racing his car himself. Petty expected to go the distance in the cool Southern California winter weather, but the #43 blew a motor and put him on the sidelines on lap 14.

=== Timeline ===
Section reference:

- Start: Cale Yarborough officially had the pole position when the green flag was waved.
- Lap 4: Darrell Waltrip took over the lead from Cale Yarborough.
- Lap 7: Terry Labonte fell out with engine failure.
- Lap 10: The clutch in Neil Bonnett's vehicle could not handle the pressures of high-speed racing.
- Lap 12: Dick Brooks fell out with engine failure.
- Lap 14: Richard Petty fell out with engine failure.
- Lap 15: Transmission problems managed to ruin Don Noel's day on the track.
- Lap 17: Jim Robinson fell out with engine failure.
- Lap 21: Bobby Allison took over the lead from Darrell Waltrip.
- Lap 28: David Pearson took over the lead from Bobby Allison.
- Lap 29: Al Holbert took over the lead from David Pearson.
- Lap 31: Darrell Waltrip took over the lead from Al Holbert.
- Lap 32: Richard White fell out with engine failure.
- Lap 48: Frank Warren fell out with engine failure.
- Lap 56: Benny Parsons managed to break his vehicle's transmission.
- Lap 60: Al Holbert took over the lead from Darrell Waltrip.
- Lap 63: David Pearson took over the lead from Al Holbert.
- Lap 64: Darrell Waltrip took over the lead from David Pearson.
- Lap 66: Cecil Gordon fell out with engine failure.
- Lap 91: David Pearson took over the lead from Darrell Waltrip.
- Lap 95: Bobby Allison took over the lead from David Pearson.
- Lap 100: Don Graham fell out with engine failure.
- Lap 103: David Pearson took over the lead from Bobby Allison.
- Lap 105: Bobby Allison fell out with engine failure.
- Lap 106: Darrell Waltrip took over the lead from David Pearson.
- Lap 111: Jimmy Insolo managed to bust his vehicle's oil pump.
- Finish: Darrell Waltrip was declared the winner of the event.

== Standings after the race ==
Pos	Driver	Points	Differential
1	Darrell Waltrip	185	0
2	David Pearson	175	-10
3	Cale Yarborough	170	-15
4	Bill Schmitt	160	-25
5	Donnie Allison	155	-30
6	Joe Millikan	150	-35
7	Buddy Baker	146	-39
8	Jim Thirkettle	142	-43
9	Tim Williamson	138	-47
10	Harry Gant	134	-51

Preceded by 1978 Los Angeles Times 500	NASCAR Winston Cup Series Season; 1978-9	Succeeded by 1979 Daytona 500

Preceded by 1978	Winston Western 500 races 1979	Succeeded by 1980
