= 1979 Gabriel 400 =

Auto race held at Michigan International Speedway in 1979

Race details
- Race 16 of 31 in the 1979 NASCAR Winston Cup Series season
- 1979 Gabriel 400 program cover
- Date: June 17, 1979
- Official name: Gabriel 400
- Location: Michigan International Speedway (Brooklyn, Michigan, USA)
- Course: Permanent racing facility
- Course length: 2.000 miles (3.218 km)
- Distance: 200 laps, 400 mi (643 km)
- Weather: Hot with temperatures of 90.9 °F (32.7 °C); wind speeds of 15 miles per hour (24 km/h)
- Average speed: 135.798 miles per hour (218.546 km/h)
- Attendance: 62,000

Pole position
Driver	Neil Bonnett	Wood Brothers Racing

Most laps led
Driver	Buddy Baker	Ranier Racing
- Laps: 121

Winner
No. 28	Buddy Baker	Ranier Racing

Television in the United States
- Network: ABC
- Announcers: Al Michaels; Jackie Stewart

The 1979 Gabriel 400 was a NASCAR Winston Cup Series race that took place on June 17, 1979, at Michigan International Speedway in Brooklyn, Michigan.

Roger Hamby's vehicle (driven by Steve Pfeifer) crashes while racing at the 1979 Gabriel 400.

The NASCAR Winston Cup Series races that were being shown at Michigan International Speedway between the late-1970s and the late-1980s were exceptionally good by modern standards.

== Background ==
Michigan International Speedway is a four-turn superspeedway that is 2 miles (3.2 km) long. Opened in 1968, the track's turns are banked at eighteen degrees, while the 3,600-foot-long front stretch, the location of the finish line, is banked at twelve degrees. The back stretch, has a five degree banking and is 2,242 feet long.

== Race report ==
Two hundred laps were done on a paved oval track spanning 2.000 miles (3.219 km). The total time of the race was two hours, fifty-six minutes, and forty-four seconds. There were six cautions for thirty-three laps with the race finishing under caution. Speeds were: 135.798 miles per hour (218.546 km/h) as the average and 162.371 miles per hour (261.311 km/h) as the pole position speed.

Sixty-two thousand fans managed to see Buddy Baker defeat Donnie Allison under caution. The race was also Bill Seifert's final start in addition to being Bill Elliott's 33rd start in the NASCAR Cup Series; Elliott would lead the first lap of his NASCAR Cup Series career during this event. Other famous drivers like Darrell Waltrip (who retained the championship points lead after this race but lost it at the 1979 running of the Los Angeles Times 500 by 11 points), Richard Childress (now the owner of Richard Childress Racing), Benny Parsons, and Terry Labonte have participated in this race.

This was Marty Robbins' last race in his signature #42. He would switch to using a variety of different numbers from here on out, normally the #6. He changed numbers to free up the #42 for young Kyle Petty to use it, reviving his family's use of the digit his grandfather Lee Petty had made so famous.

Engine problems took out Bill Seifert on lap 32 in addition to Marty Robbins on lap 64 and Bill Green on lap 76. Problems with the vehicle's shocks eliminated Tommy Gale from the race on lap 84. Lap 97 would be very unkind to Paul Fess and Benny Parsons; whose vehicles would suffer from faulty engines. Joe Millikan would notice that his vehicle's engine stopped working on lap 103 while Roger Hamby would inflict terminal vehicle damage on lap 122. Further engine problems knocked David Sosebee out of the race on lap 135 and Ronnie Thomas on lap 150. Dave Marcis would inflict terminal vehicle damage on lap 173. Bob Burcham noticed that his vehicle's engine stopped working on lap 184. Frank Warren inflicted terminal vehicle damage on lap 186 while Darrell Waltrip had to leave the race due to a faulty engine on lap 197.

While substituting for Roger Hamby during the middle of this racing event, Steve Pfeifer lost control of his car during a caution period and injured a couple of spectators on the pit wall while attempting to stop his vehicle for maintenance. He would be later sent to Foote West Hospital in nearby Jackson; where the doctors gave him a good prognosis and eventually released him with cuts on his right knee and chest.

The lead changed 47 times among 11 drivers. Dale Earnhardt was criticized by Darrell Waltrip and Richard Petty when he nearly spun out trying to pass Neil Bonnett late in the race in front of both ("He nearly took us all out in the third turn," Waltrip said after the race).

Notable crew chiefs to actively participate in the race were Buddy Parrott, Tex Powell, Joey Arrington, Kirk Shelmerdine, Darrell Bryant, Dale Innman, Harry Hyde, Bud Moore, Tim Brewer, and Jake Elder. The total winnings of this race were $148,505 ($658,773.9 when adjusted for inflation). Buddy Baker earned $16,780 in cash prizes for his win ($74,436.73 when adjusted for inflation) while Bill Seifert walked away only $960 wealthier ($4,258.6 when adjusted for inflation).

=== Qualifying ===
Grid	No.	Driver	Manufacturer	Owner
1	21	Neil Bonnett	Mercury	Wood Brothers
2	1	Donnie Allison	Chevrolet	Hoss Ellington
3	28	Buddy Baker	Chevrolet	Harry Ranier
4	72	Joe Millikan	Chevrolet	L.G. DeWitt
5	11	Cale Yarborough	Oldsmobile	Junior Johnson
6	15	Bobby Allison	Ford	Bud Moore
7	44	Terry Labonte	Chevrolet	Billy Hagan
8	90	Ricky Rudd	Mercury	Junie Donlavey
9	88	Darrell Waltrip	Chevrolet	DiGard Racing
10	43	Richard Petty	Chevrolet	Petty Enterprises
11	9	Bill Elliott	Mercury	George Elliott
12	30	Tighe Scott	Buick	Walter Ballard
13	2	Dale Earnhardt	Chevrolet	Rod Osterlund
14	49	Bill Green	Chevrolet	Charles Dean
15	71	Dave Marcis	Chevrolet	Dave Marcis

== Finishing order ==
Section reference:

POS	ST	#	DRIVER	SPONSOR / OWNER	CAR	LAPS	MONEY	STATUS	LED	PTS
1	3	28	Buddy Baker	Spectra (Harry Ranier)	Chevrolet	200	16870	running	121	185
2	2	1	Donnie Allison	Hawaiian Tropic (Hoss Ellington)	Chevrolet	200	12970	running	25	175
3	5	11	Cale Yarborough	Busch (Junior Johnson)	Oldsmobile	200	12620	running	4	170
4	1	21	Neil Bonnett	Purolator (Wood Brothers)	Mercury	200	7410	running	9	165
5	10	43	Richard Petty	STP (Petty Enterprises)	Chevrolet	200	8325	running	23	160
6	13	2	Dale Earnhardt	Rod Osterlund	Chevrolet	200	7540	running	1	155
7	6	15	Bobby Allison	Hodgdon / Moore (Bud Moore)	Ford	200	6830	running	1	151
8	8	90	Ricky Rudd	Truxmore (Junie Donlavey)	Mercury	199	5665	running	0	142
9	12	30	Tighe Scott	Russ Togs (Walter Ballard)	Buick	199	5480	running	0	138
10	34	05	Dick Brooks	Bearfinder (Nelson Malloch)	Chevrolet	199	4650	running	0	
11	19	12	Lennie Pond	Kencoal Mining (Kennie Childers)	Chevrolet	199	2425	running	0	130
12	11	9	Bill Elliott	Knutsons Ski-Doo (George Elliott)	Mercury	198	2315	running	1	132
13	9	88	Darrell Waltrip	Gatorade (DiGard Racing)	Chevrolet	197	5655	engine	8	129
14	22	70	J.D. McDuffie	Bailey Excavating (J.D. McDuffie)	Chevrolet	196	4060	running	0	121
15	30	67	Buddy Arrington	Reid Trailer Sales (Buddy Arrington)	Dodge	196	3865	running	0	118
16	26	52	Jimmy Means	Mr. Transmission (Jimmy Means)	Chevrolet	193	3625	running	0	115
17	24	47	Harry Gant	Race Hill Farm (Jack Beebe)	Chevrolet	193	1440	running	0	112
18	27	0	John Kennedy	Avanti CB (John Kennedy)	Chevrolet	192	1385	running	0	109
19	36	38	Sandy Satullo	Copper Kettle Marina (Sandy Satullo)	Buick	192	1345	running	0	106
20	21	48	James Hylton	Palatine Automotive Parts (James Hylton)	Chevrolet	190	3125	running	0	103
21	31	40	D.K. Ulrich	Midwestern Farm Lines (D.K. Ulrich)	Buick	190	2830	running	0	100
22	20	79	Frank Warren	Native Tan (Frank Warren)	Dodge	186	2585	crash	0	97
23	23	3	Richard Childress	CRC Chemicals (Richard Childress)	Oldsmobile	186	2380	running	0	94
24	25	19	Bob Burcham	Belden Asphalt (Henley Gray)	Chevrolet	184	2085	engine	0	91
25	7	44	Terry Labonte	Stratagraph (Billy Hagan)	Chevrolet	184	2050	running	0	88
26	15	71	Dave Marcis	Transmissions Unlimited (Dave Marcis)	Chevrolet	173	1765	crash	4	90
27	17	25	Ronnie Thomas	Stone's Cafeteria (Don Robertson)	Chevrolet	150	2970	engine	1	87
28	35	81	David Sosebee	Gober Sosebee	Chevrolet	135	1060	engine	0	
29	18	17	Roger Hamby	Kings Inn (Roger Hamby)	Chevrolet	122	1545	crash	0	76
30	4	72	Joe Millikan	Appliance Wheels (L.G. DeWitt)	Chevrolet	103	4725	engine	0	73
31	16	27	Benny Parsons	Griffin Marine (M.C. Anderson)	Chevrolet	97	1510	engine	0	70
32	28	82	Paul Fess	Lasky Construction (Stan Lasky)	Oldsmobile	97	1000	engine	0	67
33	32	64	Tommy Gale	Sunny King Ford & Honda (Elmo Langley)	Ford	84	1490	shocks	0	64
34	14	49	Bill Green	A.K. Cartage (Charles Dean)	Chevrolet	76	980	engine	2	
35	29	42	Marty Robbins	Robbins Racing (Marty Robbins)	Dodge	64	970	engine	0	58
36	33	09	Bill Seifert	CRC Chemicals (Nelson Oswald)	Oldsmobile	32	960	engine	0	55

† signifies that the driver is known to be deceased
* Driver failed to finish race

== Standings after the race ==
Pos	Driver	Points
1	Darrell Waltrip	2555
2	Bobby Allison	2514
3	Cale Yarborough	2397
4	Richard Petty	2362
5	Dale Earnhardt	2172
6	Joe Millikan	2079
7	Benny Parsons	2069
8	Terry Labonte	1933
9	Richard Childress	1931
10	J.D. McDuffie	1897

Preceded by 1979 NAPA Riverside 400	NASCAR Winston Cup Series Season; 1979	Succeeded by 1979 Firecracker 400
