= Bob Howard (racing driver) =

American racing driver (born 1944)

- Born: April 22, 1944 (age 82); Colorado Springs, Colorado, U.S.
- Awards: 1988 NASCAR Winston West Series Rookie of the Year

NASCAR Cup Series career
- Best finish: 126th (1988)

ARCA Menards Series career
- 1 race run over 1 year
- Best finish: 148th (1998)
- First race: 1998 Pikes Peak ARCA 150 (Pikes Peak)
Wins	Top tens	Poles
0	0	0

ARCA Menards Series West career
- 32 races run over 12 years
- Best finish: 7th (1988)
- First race: 1986 AC-Delco 300 (Sonoma)
- Last race: 1999 King Soopers 150 (Pikes Peak)
Wins	Top tens	Poles
0	5	0
- Statistics up to date as of November 2, 2026.

Bob Howard (born April 22, 1944) is an American former professional stock car racing driver. He primarily competed in the NASCAR Winston West Series, racing in the series between 1986 and 1999.

== Racing career ==
Howard competed in at least three NASCAR Late Model Sportsman National Championship races at Colorado Springs International Speedway in 1977, winning twice. He finished third in his only recorded start in 1978. Howard made a NASCAR Grand American Stock Car National Championship start at Colorado in 1980, finishing 24th.

Howard began competing in the NASCAR Winston West Series in 1986, running four races with a best finish of fourteenth at Sears Point International Raceway and Willow Springs Speedway.

Howard attempted four races in 1987, scoring a best finish of eleventh in the AC-Delco 200 at Sears Point. In the second NASCAR Winston Cup Series combination race at Riverside International Raceway, he failed to qualify.

In 1988, Howard ran his only full season in the series, attempting all eight races; in the six races he qualified for, he scored four top-tens with a best finish of fifth at Mesa Marin Raceway. He finished seventh in the standings and was awarded Rookie of the Year. Howard failed to qualify for the combination races at Riverside and Phoenix International Raceway. He competed in the 1988 Goodyear NASCAR 500 at Australia's Calder Park Thunderdome, finishing fifteenth. Later that year, he competed at the track again in the NASCAR Christmas 500, finishing 25th.

Howard ran two Winston West races in 1989, both at Mesa Marin, where engine issues took him out of both races, completing no laps in the first race at the track and only six laps in the second. In his final career Winston Cup attempt at Phoenix, he failed to qualify.

Howard made three Winston West starts in 1990, scoring his final top-ten at Evergreen Speedway with a seventh-place finish.

Howard ran two races at Evergreen in 1991, finishing 23rd in the season opener due to engine issues and fifteenth in the second race at the track.

Howard did not compete in the Winston West Series again until 1994, when the series was known as the Winston Transcontinental Series; he finished 27th at Mesa Marin due to a crash after eight laps and 21st at Tucson Raceway Park due to engine issues.

In 1995, Howard competed in Winston West races at Colorado National Speedway and The Bullring at Las Vegas Motor Speedway, finishing twentieth due to engine issues at Colorado and thirteenth due to overheating issues at Las Vegas.

Howard's lone start of 1996 came at Tucson, where he finished 26th due to engine issues.

Howard made two starts in 1997, finishing fourteenth at Pikes Peak International Raceway due to engine issues and seventeenth at Las Vegas Motor Speedway.

Howard attempted five races in 1998, failing to qualify at Tucson and Phoenix and failing to finish at Las Vegas, Heartland Park Topeka, and Pikes Peak. He also made his lone ARCA Bondo/Mar-Hyde Series start at Pikes Peak, finishing 30th due to engine issues.

Howard made his final Winston West attempts in 1999, failing to qualify at Las Vegas and finishing 23rd at Pikes Peak.

Howard ran seven United States Late Model Association races in 2004, scoring four top-tens with a best finish of sixth at Altus Speedway and Sandia Motorsports Park. He finished eighth in the standings.

Howard competed in two United States Late Model Association races at Sandia in 2005, finishing fourth in both.

== Motorsports career results ==
=== NASCAR ===
(key) (Bold – Pole position awarded by qualifying time. Italics – Pole position earned by points standings or practice time. * – Most laps led.)

==== Winston Cup Series ====
NASCAR Winston Cup Series results
Year	Team	No.	Make	1	2	3	4	5	6	7	8	9	10	11	12	13	14	15	16	17	18	19	20	21	22	23	24	25	26	27	28	29	NWCSC	Pts	Ref
1987	Oldsmobile Motorsports	89	Olds	DAY	CAR	RCH	ATL	DAR	NWS	BRI	MAR	TAL	CLT	DOV	POC	RSD	MCH	DAY	POC	TAL	GLN	MCH	BRI	DAR	RCH	DOV	MAR	NWS	CLT	CAR	RSD; DNQ	ATL	151st	0	
1988	Oldsmobile Motorsports	89W	Olds	DAY	RCH	CAR	ATL	DAR	BRI	NWS	MAR	TAL	CLT	DOV	RSD; DNQ	POC	MCH	DAY	POC	TAL	GLN	MCH	BRI	DAR	RCH	DOV	MAR	CLT	NWS	CAR	PHO; DNQ	ATL	126th	0	
1989	Oldsmobile Motorsports	89	Olds	DAY	CAR	ATL	RCH	DAR	BRI	NWS	MAR	TAL	CLT	DOV	SON	POC	MCH	DAY	POC	TAL	GLN	MCH	BRI	DAR	RCH	DOV	MAR	CLT	NWS	CAR	PHO; DNQ	ATL	130th	0	

==== Winston West Series ====
NASCAR Winston West Series results
Year	Team	No.	Make	1	2	3	4	5	6	7	8	9	10	11	12	13	14	15	NWWSC	Pts	Ref
1986	Bob Howard	4	Olds	SON; 14	RSD	EVG; 25	RCS; 19	TAC	PIR; 16	WSR; 14	RSD								14th	171	
1987	Oldsmobile Motorsports	89	Olds	SON; 11	RSD	SGP	EVG	POR	TAC; 23	MMR; 13	RSD; DNQ								22nd	136	
1988	Oldsmobile Motorsports	89	Olds	SON; 11	MMR; 9	RSD; DNQ	SGP; 8	POR; 7	EVG; 15	MMR; 5*	PHO; DNQ								7th	312	
1989	Oldsmobile Motorsports	89	Olds	MAD	MMR; 24	RAS	SON	POR	TCR	EVG	MMR; 19	SGS	SON	PHO; DNQ					26th	315	
1990	Oldsmobile Motorsports	89	Olds	MMR; 16	SON	SGS	POR	EVG; 7	RAS	TCR	MMR; 11	PHO							21st	396	
1991	Oldsmobile Motorsports	89	Olds	EVG; 23	MMR	SON	SGS	POR	EVG; 15	SSS	MMR	PHO							37th	212	
1994	Oldsmobile Motorsports	89	Olds	MMR	TUS	SON	SGS	YAK	MMR	POR	IND	CAJ	TCR	LVS	MMR; 27	PHO	TUS; 21		40th	182	
1995	Oldsmobile Motorsports	89	Olds	TUS	MMR	SON	CNS; 20	MMR	POR	SGS	TUS	AMP	MAD	POR	LVS; 13	SON	MMR	PHO	38th	227	
1996	Oldsmobile Motorsports	89	Olds	TUS; 26	AMP	MMR	SON	MAD	POR	TUS	EVG	CNS	MAD	MMR	SON	MMR	PHO	LVS	66th	85	
1997	Bob Howard	02	Chevy	TUS	AMP	SON	TUS	MMR	LVS	CAL	EVG	POR	PPR; 14	AMP	SON	MMR	LVS; 17		44th	233	
1998	Bob Howard	02	Chevy	TUS; DNQ	LVS; 24	PHO; DNQ	CAL	HPT; 21	MMR	AMP	POR	CAL	PPR; 25	EVG	SON	MMR	LVS		37th	389	
1999	Bob Howard	02	Chevy	TUS	LVS; DNQ	PHO	CAL	PPR; 23	MMR	IRW	EVG	POR	IRW	RMR	LVS	MMR	MOT		62nd	134	

=== ARCA Bondo/Mar-Hyde Series ===
ARCA Bondo/Mar-Hyde Series results
Year	Team	No.	Make	1	2	3	4	5	6	7	8	9	10	11	12	13	14	15	16	17	18	19	20	21	22	ABMHSC	Pts	Ref
1998	Bob Howard	02	Chevy	DAY	ATL	SLM	CLT	MEM	MCH	POC	SBS	TOL	PPR; 30	POC	KIL	FRS	ISF	ATL	DSF	SLM	TEX	WIN	CLT	TAL	ATL	148th	NA	
