= St. James Davis =

American racing driver (1943–2018)

- Born: St. James Harley Davis; October 24, 1943; West Covina, California, United States
- Died: July 2018 (aged 74); West Covina, California, United States
- Cause of death: Cardiopulmonary arrest

NASCAR Cup Series career
- Best finish: 93rd (1995)

ARCA Menards Series West career
- 120 races run over 19 years
- Best finish: 9th (1997)
- First race: 1978 Winston Las Vegas 100 (Craig Road)
- Last race: 1998 Kidde Safety 200 (Pikes Peak)
Wins	Top tens	Poles
0	4	0
- Statistics up to date as of June 2, 2025.

St. James Harley Davis (October 24, 1943 – July 2018) was an American professional stock car racing driver. He primarily competed in the NASCAR Winston West Series, running 120 races over 19 seasons and scoring four top-ten finishes.

== Racing career ==
=== 1970s ===
Davis debuted in the NASCAR Winston West Series in 1978, where driving the No. 22 Dodge at Craig Road Speedway, he was scored fifteenth after falling out with an oil leak. He competed in five other races in 1978, failing to finish in all of them, including failing to start at Sonoma. He also failed to qualify for the season finale at Phoenix International Raceway.

Davis only competed in one West Series race in 1979, where he finished fifteenth at Ascot Park, running at the finish despite only completing eleven of 100 laps.

=== 1980s ===
Davis attempted three West Series races in 1980, including his first NASCAR Winston Cup Series attempt in a combination race at Riverside International Raceway, although he failed to qualify for both this race and the race at Laguna Seca, and finished fourteenth in the race at Stockton 99 Speedway. He also made his only appearance in the USAC Stock Car Series, finishing 35th in a race at Texas World Speedway, falling out with engine issues after ten laps.

In 1981, Davis competed in three West Series races, although mechanical issues prevented him from finishing his first two starts and a lap two crash at Riverside ended his day early; his best finish in these three races was twelfth at Laguna Seca.

Davis did not compete in NASCAR in 1982, but returned for two Winston West races in 1983, where oil pump issues knocked him out of the race early at Riverside and he crashed at Phoenix, finishing eighteenth. He also attempted the 1983 Winston Western 500, but failed to qualify.

1984 saw Davis expand his schedule to nearly the full season, attempting nine of the eleven races. He failed to qualify for the combination race with the Winston Cup Series at Riverside and failed to finish every race he ran, with his best finish being fourteenth at Shasta Speedway.

Davis ran the full 1985 West Series season, although he failed to qualify for both combination races. He failed to finish all but one race, that race being an event at Stateline Speedway where he scored his first career top-ten in ninth.

Davis attempted the full eight race schedule in 1986, again failing to qualify for both combination events and failing to finish every standalone race, with his best result of the season being twentieth in the race at Race City Speedway.

Davis competed full time again in 1987, once more failing to make the field for both combination races but only failing to finish once, having drive line issues in the season opener at Sears Point International Raceway. Davis was running at the finish in every other race, scoring a best finish of twelfth at Spokane.

Davis' 1988 season was similar so 1987, as he again attempted every race, failed to qualify for the combination races, and was running at the finish more consistently. His best finish came at Mesa Marin Raceway, where he finished thirteenth. He and his team traveled overseas to compete in the Goodyear NASCAR 500 at the Calder Park Thunderdome in Australia. They were involved in controversy after packing their engine builder, Mitch Klon, in the shipping container with the car to save money. Upon arriving in Australia, Klon was turned over to Australian authorities, quarantined, and released into the custody of Bob Jane, where he would earn his return fare doing manual labor for the authorities. The actual race itself was short for Davis, as he fell out of the race after just two laps due to handling issues.

The West Series expanded to an eleven race schedule in 1989, and Davis attempted the full season, failing to make the field for the combination races as in past years, and only running at the finish in three races, his best result being eleventh at Redwood Acres Speedway.

=== 1990s ===
Davis continued attempting the full schedule in 1990, again failing to qualify for both combination races with the Winston Cup Series. He was running at the finish of four races in 1990, scoring a best result of twelfth in the longest race of the season at Evergreen Speedway.

The 1991 season opened at Evergreen, and Davis scored his second career top-ten, finishing tenth. He attempted the full season, failing to qualify for the combination races as in past years, although was running at the finish of all but one race. This would ultimately be his final full-time season in the series, and he finished eleventh in points for the sixth time.

Davis competed in seven races in 1992, scoring two straight top-tens at Saugus Speedway and Shasta Speedway. These would be his final top-ten results in the series.

After not competing in NASCAR in 1993, Davis attempted eight races in 1994, failing to qualify for the combination race at Phoenix and failing to finish in every race, scoring a best finish of fourteenth at Cajon Speedway.

Davis again attempted eight races in 1995, failing to qualify for the combination race at Sonoma and failing to finish with various issues in all but one start, with a best finish of fourteenth at Tucson Speedway despite running no laps due to engine issues.

Davis attempted ten races in 1996, although failed to start in three of them and was only running at the finish at Colorado National Speedway; his best finish of the season was fifteenth at Madera Speedway despite failing to start the race.

Davis attempted nearly the entire 1997 season, although failed to qualify at Mesa Marin. His best result was eleventh at Pikes Peak International Raceway. He also finished in the top-ten in points for the first time, ending the season ninth in the standings.

Davis' final starts came during the 1998 season, where he attempted five races, failing to qualify for two and failing to finish the three he made; his final start would end after 42 laps at Pikes Peak with engine issues. He also attempted to qualify for a NASCAR Featherlite Southwest Tour race at the Los Angeles Street Circuit, but failed to qualify.

Davis made one final attempt in the West Series in 1999, failing to qualify for the fourth race of the season at California Speedway.

== 2005 chimpanzee attack and aftermath ==
Davis and his wife LaDonna had a pet chimpanzee named Moe who was treated as if he was a child. They adopted Moe in 1967 not long after his birth in Tanzania. After he bit several people, he was seized by the city of West Covina, California, then placed into an animal sanctuary near Bakersfield, California. St. James and LaDonna had a long but unsuccessful legal battle to recover Moe, and would often visit him at the sanctuary. On March 3, 2005, St. James and LaDonna came to the sanctuary, Animal Haven Ranch, to celebrate Moe's 39th birthday. They brought him a birthday cake and were seated at a picnic table next to his enclosure. They brought toys, candy hearts, chocolate milk, and a raspberry-filled sheet cake for the party. LaDonna said Moe clapped his hands with joy when he saw them. She cut a piece of cake for him and then, when she went to cut a second piece, she noticed that another chimpanzee had gotten out of its cage. It rushed up to her and bit her thumb off. St. James pushed her under the table to protect her. A second chimpanzee was also loose. The two young chimpanzees involved in the attack were named Buddy and Ollie. Moe did not participate in the attack. Buddy and Ollie, however, attacked St. James simultaneously; one chimpanzee initially attacked his face, the other chimpanzee attacked his foot. The sanctuary owner's son-in-law, Mark Carruthers, retrieved a .45 caliber revolver and shot Buddy in the head. Meanwhile, Ollie dragged St. James' body down a walkway. Carruthers followed and shot him. Buddy and Ollie destroyed a majority of St. James' fingers, his left foot, most of his buttocks, both testicles, part of his torso, and parts of his face including his nose and lips. A paramedic who arrived said, "It looked like a grizzly bear attack." St. James was transported to Loma Linda University Medical Center after the attack. Davis spent six months in the hospital recovering from the attack, including a period of time when he was in a coma. He had a prosthetic eye and two slits in the middle of his face where his nose was. He and LaDonna were uninsured, but initially decided not to sue Animal Haven, before reversing course and filing a lawsuit by 2009.

In 2006, the year following the attack, St. James and LaDonna placed a sign in their front yard that read "Free Moe". They also went to Superior Court in Pomona, California, to get the city of West Covina to honor their 2002 settlement which required it to purchase a home for them in Baldwin Park so that they could reunite with Moe. In 2007, the court ruled that West Covina should pay them US$32,000 because it did not fulfill their obligations under the 2002 settlement, pay them $300 per month towards covering the costs of Moe's housing, and covering travel expenses for their visits to him.

Moe disappeared in the summer of 2008. He had been living at a ranch for performing animals, Jungle Exotics, in San Bernardino. Construction workers reported they had seen him at a home near Jungle Exotics; other witnesses spotted him heading towards a mountain. St. James and LaDonna hired a helicopter to do flyovers in an attempt to flush him out of hiding, and authorities searched the San Bernardino National Forest, but he has never been found.

St. James suffered a stroke in December 2017 and died of a cardiopulmonary arrest in July of the next year. His widow, LaDonna, later became a victim of elder abuse through financial means. The alleged perpetrator, Min Maw, coerced the aging LaDonna to sign over a living will to himself that included the Davis's properties and control of active bank accounts. After the Mongols Motorcycle Club, which had taken over the Davis' house, were finally evicted by authorities, a legal battle began with Maw, which was eventually settled so as to preserve what little remained of LaDonna's stolen assets, rather than risk a lengthy and expensive court case.

== Personal life ==
Davis had a Native American name, Whitecloud, that he wanted to race under, but this was declined by NASCAR. He was married to LaDonna Davis, who was an important part of his race team, serving as the team's owner, crew chief, and engine builder.

== Motorsport career results ==
=== NASCAR ===
(key) (Bold – Pole position awarded by qualifying time. Italics – Pole position earned by points standings or practice time. * – Most laps led.)

==== Winston Cup Series ====
NASCAR Winston Cup Series results
Year	Team	No.	Make	1	2	3	4	5	6	7	8	9	10	11	12	13	14	15	16	17	18	19	20	21	22	23	24	25	26	27	28	29	30	31	NWCC	Pts	Ref
1980	Davis Racing	22	Dodge	RSD; DNQ	DAY	RCH	CAR	ATL	BRI	DAR	NWS	MAR	TAL	NSV	DOV	CLT	TWS	RSD	MCH	DAY	NSV	POC	TAL	MCH	BRI	DAR	RCH	DOV	NWS	MAR	CLT	CAR	ATL	ONT; DNQ	129th	0	
1983	Davis Racing	02	Unknown	DAY	RCH	CAR	ATL	DAR	NWS	MAR	TAL	NSV	DOV	BRI	CLT	RSD	POC	MCH	DAY	NSV	POC	TAL	MCH	BRI	DAR	RCH	DOV	MAR	NWS	CLT	CAR	ATL	RSD; DNQ		134th	0	
1984	St. James Racing	02	Chrysler	DAY	RCH	CAR	ATL	BRI	NWS	DAR	MAR	TAL	NSV	DOV	CLT	RSD	POC	MCH	DAY	NSV	POC	TAL	MCH	BRI	DAR	RCH	DOV	MAR	CLT	NWS	CAR	ATL	RSD; DNQ		138th	0	
1985	St. James Racing	02	Chrysler	DAY	RCH	CAR	ATL	BRI	DAR	NWS	MAR	TAL	DOV	CLT	RSD; DNQ	POC	MCH	DAY	POC	TAL	MCH	BRI	DAR	RCH	DOV	MAR	NWS	CLT	CAR	ATL	RSD				130th	0	
1986	St. James Racing	20	Buick	DAY	RCH	CAR	ATL	BRI	DAR	NWS	MAR	TAL	DOV	CLT	RSD; DNQ	POC	MCH	DAY	POC	TAL	GLN	MCH	BRI	DAR	RCH	DOV	MAR	NWS	CLT	CAR	ATL				137th	0	
1986	St. James Racing	22W	Buick																													RSD; DNQ			137th	0	
1987	St. James Racing	2	Buick	DAY	CAR	RCH	ATL	DAR	NWS	BRI	MAR	TAL	CLT	DOV	POC	RSD; DNQ	MCH	DAY	POC	TAL	GLN	MCH	BRI	DAR	RCH	DOV	MAR	NWS	CLT	CAR	RSD; DNQ	ATL			136th	0	
1988	St. James Racing	22W	Buick	DAY	RCH	CAR	ATL	DAR	BRI	NWS	MAR	TAL	CLT	DOV	RSD; DNQ	POC	MCH	DAY	POC	TAL	GLN	MCH	BRI	DAR	RCH	DOV	MAR	CLT	NWS	CAR	PHO; DNQ	ATL			129th	0	
1989	St. James Racing	22	Buick	DAY	CAR	ATL	RCH	DAR	BRI	NWS	MAR	TAL	CLT	DOV	SON	POC	MCH	DAY	POC	TAL	GLN	MCH	BRI	DAR	RCH	DOV	MAR	CLT	NWS	CAR	PHO; DNQ	ATL			126th	0	
1990	St. James Racing	22	Buick	DAY	RCH	CAR	ATL	DAR	BRI	NWS	MAR	TAL	CLT	DOV	SON; DNQ	POC	MCH	DAY	POC	TAL	GLN	MCH	BRI	DAR	RCH	DOV	MAR	NWS	CLT	CAR					121st	0	
1990	St. James Racing	22	Chevrolet																												PHO; DNQ	ATL			121st	0	
1991	St. James Racing	22	Buick	DAY	RCH	CAR	ATL	DAR	BRI	NWS	MAR	TAL	CLT	DOV	SON	POC	MCH	DAY	POC	TAL	GLN	MCH	BRI	DAR	RCH	DOV	MAR	NWS	CLT	CAR	PHO; DNQ	ATL			118th	0	
1994	St. James Racing	22W	Pontiac	DAY	CAR	RCH	ATL	DAR	BRI	NWS	MAR	TAL	SON	CLT	DOV	POC	MCH	DAY	NHA	POC	TAL	IND	GLN	MCH	BRI	DAR	RCH	DOV	MAR	NWS	CLT	CAR	PHO; DNQ	ATL	127th	0	
1995	St. James Racing	22W	Pontiac	DAY	CAR	RCH	ATL	DAR	BRI	NWS	MAR	TAL	SON; DNQ	CLT	DOV	POC	MCH	DAY	NHA	POC	TAL	IND	GLN	MCH	BRI	DAR	RCH	DOV	MAR	NWS	CLT	CAR	PHO	ATL	93rd	0	

==== Winston West Series ====
NASCAR Winston West Series results
Year	Team	No.	Make	1	2	3	4	5	6	7	8	9	10	11	12	13	14	15	16	17	18	19	20	21	22	NWWC	Pts	Ref
1978	Davis Racing	22	Dodge	RSD	AAS	S99	SHA	PET	MMR	RSD	IFS	YAK	WSP	LSP	EVG	POR	CRS; 15	ASP; 20	SON; 26	SHA; 22	CBS; 19	YAK	OSS; 20	ONT	PHO; DNQ	29th	159	
1979	Davis Racing	22	Dodge	RSD	MMR	RSD	EVG	YAK	POR	AAS	SHA	CRS	SON	EVG	SPO	POR	ASP; 15	ONT	PHO							N/A	36	
1980	Davis Racing	22	Dodge	RSD; DNQ	ONT	S99; 14	RSD	LAG; DNQ	EVG	POR	SON	MMR	ONT	PHO												31st	69	
1981	Davis Racing	22	Dodge	RSD	S99; 19	AAS	MMR	RSD	LAG; 12	POR	WSP	EVG	SHA	RSD; 26	SON	RSD	PHO									46th	32	
1983	Davis Racing	22	Chevy	S99	SON	RSD	YAK	EVG	SHA	RSD; 25	CPL	RSD														30th	85	
1983	Davis Racing	22	Chrysler										PHO; 18													30th	85	
1984	St. James Racing	22	Chrysler	RSD	YAK	SIR; 22	POR; 17	EVG; 15	SHA; 14	WSR; 17		MMR; 21		PHO; 25												13th	288	
1984	St. James Racing	02	Chrysler								SON; 18		RSD; DNQ													13th	288	
1985	St. James Racing	22	Chrysler	SON; 14	SHA; 16		MMR; 19	SIR; 14	POR; 19	STA; 9	YAK; 12	EVG; 28	WSR; 22	MMR; 22												11th	393	
1985	St. James Racing	22W	Chrysler			RSD; DNQ									RSD; DNQ											11th	393	
1986	St. James Racing	22	Buick	SON; 22		EVG; 26	RCS; 20	TAC; 25	PIR; 29	WSR; 24																11th	221	
1986	St. James Racing	20	Buick		RSD; DNQ																					11th	221	
1986	St. James Racing	22W	Buick								RSD; DNQ															11th	221	
1987	St. James Racing	22	Buick	SON; 19		SGP; 12	EVG; 21	POR; 19	TAC; 16	MMR; 16																12th	262	
1987	St. James Racing	2	Buick		RSD; DNQ						RSD; DNQ															12th	262	
1988	St. James Racing	22	Buick	SON; 16	MMR; 13	RSD; DNQ	SGP; 18	POR; 19	EVG; 20	MMR; 19	PHO; DNQ															11th	263	
1989	St. James Racing	22	Buick	MAD; 13	MMR; 18	RAS; 11	SON; DNQ	POR; 15	TCR; 12	EVG; 24	MMR; 20	SGS; 13	SON; 19	PHO; DNQ												11th	1259	
1990	St. James Racing	22	Buick	MMR; 23	SON; DNQ	SGS; 17	POR; 21	EVG; 12	RAS; 17	TCR; 17	MMR; 19	PHO; DNQ														11th	902	
1991	St. James Racing	22	Buick	EVG; 10	MMR; 15	SON; DNQ	SGS; 12	POR; 16		SSS; 17	MMR; 15	PHO; DNQ														11th	1042	
1991	St. James Racing	28	Buick						EVG; 26																	11th	1042	
1992	St. James Racing	22	Buick	MMR; 13	SGS; 9	SON	SHA; 10	POR; 14			CAJ; 15	TWS	MMR; 26	PHO												12th	935	
1992	St. James Racing	22W	Buick						EVG; 23	SSS																12th	935	
1994	St. James Racing	22	Buick	MMR; 26	TUS; 23	SON	SGS; 18	YAK; 20	MMR	POR	IND	CAJ; 14	TCR	LVS; 22												14th	906	
1994	St. James Racing	22	Pontiac												MMR; 26	PHO; DNQ	TUS									14th	906	
1995	St. James Racing	22	Buick	TUS; 21	MMR; 26																					18th	856	
1995	St. James Racing	22	Pontiac			SON; DNQ																				18th	856	
1995	La Donna's Motorsports	22	Buick				CNS; 18	MMR; 21	POR; 24	SGS; 17	TUS; 14	AMP	MAD	POR	LVS	SON	MMR	PHO								18th	856	
1996	La Donna's Motorsports	22	Pontiac	TUS	AMP; 26	MMR	SON			TUS; 18		CNS; 17			SON; 23			LVS; 24								15th	1021	
1996	La Donna's Motorsports	22	Buick					MAD; 15	POR		EVG; 24		MAD; 19	MMR; 20		MMR; 20	PHO									15th	1021	
1997	La Donna's Motorsports	22	Buick	TUS; 20	AMP; 24	SON	TUS; 14	MMR; 15			EVG; 13	POR; 15			SON	MMR; DNQ										9th	1363	
1997	La Donna's Motorsports	22	Chevy						LVS; 23																	9th	1363	
1997	La Donna's Motorsports	22	Pontiac							CAL; 16			PPR; 11	AMP			LVS; 35									9th	1363	
1998	La Donna's Motorsports	22	Pontiac	TUS	LVS; DNQ	PHO	CAL; 36	HPT	MMR	AMP	POR	CAL; 32	PPR; 27	EVG	SON	MMR	LVS; DNQ									46th	272	
1999	La Donna's Motorsports	22	Pontiac	TUS	LVS	PHO	CAL; DNQ	PPR	MMR	IRW	EVG	POR	IRW	RMR	LVS	MMR	MOT									94th	46	
