= 1987 AC-Delco 200 =

1st race of the 1987 NASCAR Winston West Series

Race details
- Race 1 of 8 in the 1987 NASCAR Winston West Series season
- Date: April 26, 1987
- Location: Sears Point International Raceway in Sonoma, California
- Course: Permanent racing facility
- Course length: 1.700 miles (2.736 km)
- Distance: 75 laps, 127.500 mi (205.191 km)
- Average speed: 80.062 miles per hour (128.847 km/h)
- Attendance: 15,582

Pole position
Driver	Jim Bown	Kieper Racing

Most laps led
Driver	Hershel McGriff	Gary Smith
- Laps: 31

Winner
No. 04	Hershel McGriff	Gary Smith

The 1987 AC-Delco 200 was the first stock car race of the 1987 NASCAR Winston West Series. The race was held on Sunday, April 26, 1987, at Sears Point International Raceway, a 1.700 mile (2.736 km) road course in Sonoma, California. The race took the scheduled 75 laps to complete. The race was won by Hershel McGriff, his first of two wins that season. McGriff took the lead from Bill Schmitt on lap 44 and held off Sumner McKnight and Chad Little for the win. J.C. Danielsen and Ron Rainwater rounded out the top five.

== Report ==
=== Background ===
Sonoma Raceway, then known as Sears Point International Raceway, is a road course and dragstrip located at Sears Point in the southern Sonoma Mountains of Sonoma County, California. The road course features 12 turns on a hilly course with 160 ft (49 m) of total elevation change.

==== Entry list ====
#	Driver	Owner	Manufacturer
1	Jeff Barrister	Unknown	Buick
04	Hershel McGriff	Gary Smith	Pontiac
12	Terry Petris	John & Terry Petris	Chevrolet
14	Dave Byrd	Dave Byrd	Buick
17	Harry Goularte	Jim Whalen/Harry Goularte	Chevrolet
18	Glen Steurer	Glen Steurer	Chevrolet
22	St. James Davis	LaDonna Davis	Buick
32	Ruben Garcia	Fred Stoke	Buick
33	John Krebs	John Krebs	Oldsmobile
41	Jack Sellers	Sara Vincent	Chevrolet
45	Bob Kennedy	Myung Suk Lee	Chevrolet
54	Norm Boucher	Unknown	Buick
73	Bill Schmitt	Bill Schmitt	Chevrolet
74	Ray Kelly	Ray Kelly	Pontiac
75	Roman Calczynski	Wayne Spears	Buick
78	Jim Robinson	Lois Williams	Oldsmobile
79	Roy Smith	Warren Razore	Ford
82	J.C. Danielsen	Shirnell Gautsche	Buick
83	Sumner McKnight	Sumner McKnight	Ford
89	Bob Howard	Tom Hathaway	Oldsmobile
92	Ron Rainwater	Al Rainwater	Chevrolet
95	Chad Little	George Jefferson	Ford
98	Jim Bown	John Kieper	Chevrolet

== Qualifying ==
Jim Bown won the pole with a speed of 97.420 mph.

== Race results ==
Fin	St	#	Driver	Owner	Make	Laps	Led	Status	Pts
1	4	04	Hershel McGriff	Gary Smith	Pontiac	75	31	Running	60
2	8	83	Sumner McKnight	Sumner McKnight	Ford	75	0	Running	49
3	11	95	Chad Little	George Jefferson	Ford	75	1	Running	48
4	15	82	J.C. Danielsen	Shirnell Gautsche	Buick	75	0	Running	47
5	14	92	Ron Rainwater	Al Rainwater	Chevrolet	75	0	Running	46
6	22	32	Ruben Garcia	Fred Stoke	Buick	74	0	Running	45
7	9	17	Harry Goularte	Jim Whalen/Harry Goularte	Chevrolet	74	0	Running	44
8	12	33	John Krebs	John Krebs	Oldsmobile	74	0	Running	43
9	10	75	Roman Calczynski	Wayne Spears	Buick	73	0	Rear End	42
10	21	74	Ray Kelly	Ray Kelly	Pontiac	73	0	Running	41
11	16	89	Bob Howard	Tom Hathaway	Oldsmobile	73	0	Running	40
12	23	45	Bob Kennedy	Myung Suk Lee	Chevrolet	73	0	Running	39
13	6	12	Terry Petris	John & Terry Petris	Chevrolet	73	0	Running	38
14	2	73	Bill Schmitt	Bill Schmitt	Chevrolet	72	29	Running	37
15	24	1	Jeff Barrister	Unknown	Buick	71	0	Running	36
16	7	78	Jim Robinson	Lois Williams	Oldsmobile	68	0	Running	35
17	5	18	Glen Steurer	Glen Steurer	Chevrolet	54	0	Accident	34
18	17	54	Norm Boucher	Unknown	Buick	45	0	Oil Leak	33
19	18	22	St. James Davis	LaDonna Davis	Buick	36	0	Drive Line	32
20	20	14	Dave Byrd	Dave Byrd	Buick	32	0	Transmission	31
21	3	79	Roy Smith	Warren Razore	Ford	27	0	Transmission	30
22	1	98	Jim Bown	John Kieper	Chevrolet	25	14	Engine	29
23	19	41	Jack Sellers	Sara Vincent	Chevrolet	20	0	Transmission	28

== Standings after the race ==
Pos	Driver	Points
1	Hershel McGriff	60
2	Sumner McKnight	49 (-11)
3	Chad Little	48 (-12)
4	J.C. Danielsen	47 (-13)
5	Ron Rainwater	46 (-14)
6	Ruben Garcia	45 (-15)
7	Harry Goularte	44 (-16)
8	John Krebs	43 (-17)
9	Roman Calczynski	42 (-18)
10	Ray Kelly	41 (-19)

- Note: Only the first 10 positions are included for the driver standings.

Previous race: 1986 Winston Western 500	NASCAR Winston West Series; 1987 season	Next race: 1987 Budweiser 400
