= 1986 Budweiser 400 =

12th race of the 1986 NASCAR Winston Cup Series

Race details
- Race 12 of 29 in the 1986 NASCAR Winston Cup Series
- The 1986 Budweiser 400 program cover, featuring Darrell Waltrip.
- Date: June 1, 1986
- Official name: 18th Annual Budweiser 400
- Location: Riverside International Raceway, Riverside, California
- Course: Permanent racing facility
- Course length: 2.62 miles (4.216 km)
- Distance: 95 laps, 248.9 mi (400.565 km)
- Scheduled distance: 95 laps, 248.9 mi (400.565 km)
- Average speed: 105.083 miles per hour (169.115 km/h)
- Attendance: 45,126

Pole position
Driver	Darrell Waltrip	Junior Johnson & Associates
- Time: 1:20.611

Most laps led
Driver	Tim Richmond	Hendrick Motorsports
- Laps: 43

Winner
No. 11	Darrell Waltrip	Junior Johnson & Associates

Television in the United States
- Network: TNN (via American Sports Cavalcade)
- Announcers: Steve Evans, Brock Yates

Radio in the United States
- Radio: Motor Racing Network

The 1986 Budweiser 400 was the 12th stock car race of the 1986 NASCAR Winston Cup Series, the second race of the 1986 NASCAR Winston West Series, and the 18th iteration of the event. The race was held on Sunday, June 1, 1986, before an audience of 45,126 in Riverside, California, at the short layout of Riverside International Raceway, a 2.62 miles (4.22 km) permanent road course layout at the track. The race took the scheduled 95 laps to complete.

With two laps left in the race, a caution flag was called for a four car wreck. The top two at the time, Hendrick Motorsports' Tim Richmond and Junior Johnson & Associates' Darrell Waltrip, raced back to the line, with the driver leading by the start of the next lap essentially being guaranteed the victory. In the final turn of the track, Waltrip was able to pass Richmond exiting the turn, giving Waltrip the lead and the victory. The victory was Waltrip's 68th career NASCAR Winston Cup Series victory and his first victory of the season. To fill out the top three, Bud Moore Engineering's Ricky Rudd finished third.

== Background ==
The layout of Riverside International Raceway, the venue where the race was held.

Riverside International Raceway (sometimes known as Riverside, RIR, or Riverside Raceway) was a motorsports race track and road course established in the Edgemont area of Riverside County, California, just east of the city limits of Riverside and 50 mi (80 km) east of Los Angeles, in 1957. In 1984, the raceway became part of the newly incorporated city of Moreno Valley. Riverside was noted for its hot, dusty environment and for being somewhat of a complicated and dangerous track for drivers. It was also considered one of the finest tracks in the United States.

=== Entry list ===
- (R) denotes rookie driver.

#	Driver	Team	Make	Sponsor
1	Bill Osborne	Osborne Racing	Buick	Osborne Racing
3	Dale Earnhardt	Richard Childress Racing	Chevrolet	Wrangler
04	Hershel McGriff	Smith Racing	Pontiac	Wershow–Ash–Lewis Auctioneers
5	Geoff Bodine	Hendrick Motorsports	Chevrolet	Levi Garrett
6	D. K. Ulrich	U.S. Racing	Chevrolet	U.S. Racing
7	Kyle Petty	Wood Brothers Racing	Ford	7-Eleven
8	Bobby Hillin Jr.	Stavola Brothers Racing	Chevrolet	Miller American
08	Rick McCray	McCray Racing	Buick	McCray Racing
9	Bill Elliott	Melling Racing	Ford	Coors
11	Darrell Waltrip	Junior Johnson & Associates	Chevrolet	Budweiser
12	Neil Bonnett	Junior Johnson & Associates	Chevrolet	Budweiser
15	Ricky Rudd	Bud Moore Engineering	Ford	Motorcraft Quality Parts
17	Doug Heveron	Hamby Racing	Chevrolet	Kmart
18	Glen Steurer	Steurer Racing	Chevrolet	Steurer Racing
22	Bobby Allison	Stavola Brothers Racing	Buick	Miller American
23	Michael Waltrip (R)	Bahari Racing	Pontiac	Hawaiian Punch
25	Tim Richmond	Hendrick Motorsports	Chevrolet	Folgers
26	Joe Ruttman	King Racing	Buick	Quaker State
27	Rusty Wallace	Blue Max Racing	Pontiac	Alugard
28	Chad Little	George Jefferson Racing	Ford	Peterbilt
32	Ruben Garcia	Stoke Racing	Chevrolet	Suncrest Motorhomes
33	Harry Gant	Mach 1 Racing	Chevrolet	Skoal Bandit
38	John Krebs	Krebs Racing	Oldsmobile	Skoal Bandit
43	Richard Petty	Petty Enterprises	Pontiac	STP
44	Terry Labonte	Hagan Enterprises	Oldsmobile	Piedmont Airlines
48	Ron Esau	Hylton Motorsports	Chevrolet	Hylton Motorsports
52	Jimmy Means	Jimmy Means Racing	Pontiac	Jimmy Means Racing
62	Terry Petris	Petris Racing	Chevrolet	Petris Racing
64	Willy T. Ribbs	DiGard Motorsports	Chevrolet	Red Roof Inn
67	Buddy Arrington	Arrington Racing	Ford	Pannill Sweatshirts
70	J. D. McDuffie	McDuffie Racing	Pontiac	Rumple Furniture
71	Dave Marcis	Marcis Auto Racing	Pontiac	Helen Rae Special
73	Bill Schmitt	Schmitt Racing	Chevrolet	California Cooler
74	Ray Kelly	Ray Kelly Racing	Pontiac	Ray Kelly Racing
75	Morgan Shepherd	RahMoc Enterprises	Ford	Nationwise Automotive
77	Richard Lach	Stoke Racing	Buick	Stoke Racing
78	Jim Robinson	Lois Williams Racing	Oldsmobile	Hammer Security Service
79	Derrike Cope	Razore Racing	Ford	Peterbilt
86	Clay Young	Clay Young Racing	Buick	Dole Food Company
90	Ken Schrader	Donlavey Racing	Ford	Red Baron Frozen Pizza
94	Trevor Boys	Eller Racing	Pontiac	Kodak Film
99	Ted Kennedy	Stoke Racing	Chevrolet	Stoke Racing

== Qualifying ==
Qualifying was split into two rounds. The first round was held on Friday, May 30, at 6:30 PM EST. Each driver had one lap to set a time. During the first round, the top 20 drivers in the round were guaranteed a starting spot in the race. If a driver was not able to guarantee a spot in the first round, they had the option to scrub their time from the first round and try and run a faster lap time in a second round qualifying run, held on Saturday, May 31, at 2:30 PM EST. As with the first round, each driver had one lap to set a time. For this specific race, positions 21-40 were decided on time, and depending on who needed it, a select amount of positions were given to cars who had not otherwise qualified but were high enough in owner's points; up to two provisionals were given.

Darrell Waltrip, driving for Junior Johnson & Associates, won the pole, setting a time of 1:20.611 and an average speed of 117.006 miles per hour (188.303 km/h) in the first round.

No drivers failed to qualify.

=== Full qualifying results ===
Pos.	#	Driver	Team	Make	Time	Speed
1	11	Darrell Waltrip	Junior Johnson & Associates	Chevrolet	1:20.611	117.006
2	5	Geoff Bodine	Hendrick Motorsports	Chevrolet	1:20.782	116.759
3	25	Tim Richmond	Hendrick Motorsports	Chevrolet	1:20.783	116.757
4	12	Neil Bonnett	Junior Johnson & Associates	Chevrolet	1:21.340	115.958
5	44	Terry Labonte	Hagan Enterprises	Oldsmobile	1:21.377	115.905
6	27	Rusty Wallace	Blue Max Racing	Pontiac	1:21.540	115.673
7	43	Richard Petty	Petty Enterprises	Pontiac	1:21.593	115.598
8	15	Ricky Rudd	Bud Moore Engineering	Ford	1:21.784	115.328
9	33	Harry Gant	Mach 1 Racing	Chevrolet	1:22.107	114.874
10	3	Dale Earnhardt	Richard Childress Racing	Chevrolet	1:22.468	114.372
11	22	Bobby Allison	Stavola Brothers Racing	Buick	1:22.474	114.363
12	9	Bill Elliott	Melling Racing	Ford	1:22.609	114.176
13	04	Hershel McGriff	Smith Racing	Pontiac	1:22.875	113.810
14	75	Morgan Shepherd	RahMoc Enterprises	Pontiac	1:23.001	113.637
15	79	Derrike Cope	Razore Racing	Ford	1:23.107	113.492
16	7	Kyle Petty	Wood Brothers Racing	Ford	1:23.252	113.295
17	90	Ken Schrader	Donlavey Racing	Ford	1:23.330	113.189
18	71	Dave Marcis	Marcis Auto Racing	Pontiac	1:23.364	113.142
19	73	Bill Schmitt	Schmitt Racing	Chevrolet	1:23.964	112.334
20	70	J. D. McDuffie	McDuffie Racing	Pontiac	1:24.141	112.098
Failed to lock in Round 1
21	26	Joe Ruttman	King Racing	Buick	1:21.910	115.151
22	18	Glen Steurer	Steurer Racing	Chevrolet	1:23.620	112.796
23	8	Bobby Hillin Jr.	Stavola Brothers Racing	Buick	1:23.982	112.310
24	32	Ruben Garcia	Stoke Racing	Chevrolet	1:24.005	112.279
25	28	Chad Little	George Jefferson Racing	Ford	1:24.488	111.637
26	62	Terry Petris	Petris Racing	Chevrolet	1:24.619	111.464
27	6	D. K. Ulrich	U.S. Racing	Chevrolet	1:24.674	111.391
28	52	Jimmy Means	Jimmy Means Racing	Pontiac	1:24.691	111.370
29	48	Ron Esau	Hylton Motorsports	Chevrolet	1:24.797	111.230
30	64	Willy T. Ribbs	DiGard Motorsports	Chevrolet	1:24.854	111.156
31	08	Rick McCray	McCray Racing	Buick	1:24.975	110.997
32	17	Doug Heveron	Hamby Racing	Chevrolet	1:25.450	110.380
33	67	Buddy Arrington	Arrington Racing	Ford	1:25.509	110.304
34	38	John Krebs	Krebs Racing	Oldsmobile	1:25.818	109.907
35	99	Ted Kennedy	Stoke Racing	Chevrolet	1:26.130	109.509
36	23	Michael Waltrip (R)	Bahari Racing	Pontiac	1:26.324	109.263
37	86	Clay Young	Clay Young Racing	Buick	1:26.468	109.081
38	94	Trevor Boys	Eller Racing	Pontiac	1:27.268	108.081
39	77	Richard Lach	Stoke Racing	Buick	1:27.281	108.065
40	74	Ray Kelly	Ray Kelly Racing	Pontiac	1:27.317	108.020
41	78	Jim Robinson	Lois Williams Racing	Oldsmobile	1:27.407	107.909
42	1	Bill Osborne	Osborne Racing	Buick	1:27.472	107.829
Official first round qualifying results
Official starting lineup

== Race results ==
Fin	St	#	Driver	Team	Make	Laps	Led	Status	Pts	Winnings
1	1	11	Darrell Waltrip	Junior Johnson & Associates	Chevrolet	95	21	running	180	$49,000
2	3	25	Tim Richmond	Hendrick Motorsports	Chevrolet	95	43	running	180	$22,155
3	8	15	Ricky Rudd	Bud Moore Engineering	Ford	95	0	running	165	$18,650
4	6	27	Rusty Wallace	Blue Max Racing	Pontiac	95	0	running	160	$12,775
5	10	3	Dale Earnhardt	Richard Childress Racing	Chevrolet	95	0	running	155	$14,125
6	7	43	Richard Petty	Petty Enterprises	Pontiac	95	0	running	150	$7,745
7	11	22	Bobby Allison	Stavola Brothers Racing	Buick	95	0	running	146	$9,800
8	4	12	Neil Bonnett	Junior Johnson & Associates	Chevrolet	95	0	running	142	$11,000
9	9	33	Harry Gant	Mach 1 Racing	Chevrolet	95	2	running	143	$11,000
10	22	18	Glen Steurer	Steurer Racing	Chevrolet	94	0	running	134	$6,975
11	12	9	Bill Elliott	Melling Racing	Ford	94	0	running	130	$11,300
12	5	44	Terry Labonte	Hagan Enterprises	Oldsmobile	93	21	accident	132	$9,000
13	25	28	Chad Little	George Jefferson Racing	Ford	92	0	running	124	$4,965
14	20	70	J. D. McDuffie	McDuffie Racing	Pontiac	92	0	running	121	$5,755
15	41	78	Jim Robinson	Lois Williams Racing	Oldsmobile	92	0	running	118	$5,835
16	29	48	Ron Esau	Hylton Motorsports	Chevrolet	92	0	running	0	$5,325
17	17	90	Ken Schrader	Donlavey Racing	Ford	91	0	running	112	$6,040
18	19	73	Bill Schmitt	Schmitt Racing	Chevrolet	91	0	running	109	$3,755
19	33	67	Buddy Arrington	Arrington Racing	Ford	90	0	running	106	$4,545
20	32	17	Doug Heveron	Hamby Racing	Chevrolet	90	0	running	103	$4,775
21	37	86	Clay Young	Clay Young Racing	Buick	90	0	running	100	$1,400
22	28	52	Jimmy Means	Jimmy Means Racing	Pontiac	90	0	running	97	$4,115
23	35	99	Ted Kennedy	Stoke Racing	Chevrolet	89	0	running	94	$2,030
24	26	62	Terry Petris	Petris Racing	Chevrolet	88	0	accident	91	$1,985
25	36	23	Michael Waltrip (R)	Bahari Racing	Pontiac	85	0	running	88	$1,800
26	34	38	John Krebs	Krebs Racing	Oldsmobile	77	0	running	85	$1,150
27	14	75	Morgan Shepherd	RahMoc Enterprises	Pontiac	75	0	transmission	82	$3,125
28	13	04	Hershel McGriff	Smith Racing	Pontiac	73	0	running	79	$2,100
29	30	64	Willy T. Ribbs	DiGard Motorsports	Chevrolet	64	0	engine	76	$1,075
30	24	32	Ruben Garcia	Stoke Racing	Chevrolet	61	0	transmission	73	$2,050
31	15	79	Derrike Cope	Razore Racing	Ford	58	0	engine	70	$1,000
32	23	8	Bobby Hillin Jr.	Stavola Brothers Racing	Buick	58	0	running	67	$2,975
33	27	6	D. K. Ulrich	U.S. Racing	Chevrolet	53	0	running	64	$2,950
34	38	94	Trevor Boys	Eller Racing	Pontiac	41	0	engine	61	$925
35	42	1	Bill Osborne	Osborne Racing	Buick	38	0	engine	0	$850
36	40	74	Ray Kelly	Ray Kelly Racing	Pontiac	36	0	running	55	$850
37	31	08	Rick McCray	McCray Racing	Buick	33	0	engine	52	$850
38	18	71	Dave Marcis	Marcis Auto Racing	Pontiac	32	0	accident	49	$2,850
39	2	5	Geoff Bodine	Hendrick Motorsports	Chevrolet	28	8	engine	51	$7,850
40	39	77	Richard Lach	Stoke Racing	Buick	20	0	engine	43	$825
41	16	7	Kyle Petty	Wood Brothers Racing	Ford	13	0	engine	40	$7,825
42	21	26	Joe Ruttman	King Racing	Buick	5	0	engine	37	$3,325
Official race results

== Standings after the race ==
Drivers' Championship standings

	Pos	Driver	Points
	1	Dale Earnhardt	1,922
	2	Darrell Waltrip	1,803 (-119)
	3	Bobby Allison	1,651 (-271)
1	4	Rusty Wallace	1,600 (–322)
1	5	Bill Elliott	1,577 (–345)
2	6	Terry Labonte	1,568 (–354)
1	7	Tim Richmond	1,557 (–365)
1	8	Harry Gant	1,523 (–399)
1	9	Ricky Rudd	1,509 (–413)
1	10	Kyle Petty	1,401 (–521)
Official driver's standings

- Note: Only the first 10 positions are included for the driver standings.

Previous race: 1986 Coca-Cola 600	NASCAR Winston Cup Series; 1986 season	Next race: 1986 Miller High Life 500
