= 1987 NASCAR Winston West Series =

34th season of the NASCAR Winston West Series

Seasons
- ← 1986 1988 →

The 1987 NASCAR Winston West Series was the 34th season of the series. The title was won by Chad Little, his first in the series.

== Teams and drivers ==
=== Complete schedule ===
Manufacturer	Team	No.	Driver
Buick	Spears Motorsports	75	Roman Calczynski 7
Buick	Spears Motorsports	75	Tommy Kendall 1
Buick	St. James Racing	22	St. James Davis
Chevrolet	Sara Vincent	41	Jack Sellers
Chevrolet	Schmitt Racing	73	Bill Schmitt
Chevrolet	Whalen-Goularte Racing	17	Harry Goularte
Ford	Jefferson Racing	95	Chad Little
Ford	Razore Racing	79	Roy Smith
Oldsmobile	KC Racing	33	John Krebs
Oldsmobile	Lois Williams	78	Jim Robinson
Pontiac	Gary Smith	04	Hershel McGriff
Chevrolet 7 Buick 1	Stoke Racing	32	Ruben Garcia

=== Partial schedule ===
Manufacturer	Team	No.	Driver	Races
Buick	AFR Racing	1	Jeff Barrister	1
Buick	Beebe Racing	93	Troy Beebe	1
Buick	Byrd Racing	14	Dave Byrd	1
Buick	Eaton Racing	7	Ron Eaton	3
Buick	Gautsche Racing	82	J. C. Danielsen	6
Buick	Gordy Oberg	0	Gordy Oberg	1
Buick	Gordy Oberg	04	Steve Hurley	1
Buick	Puskarich Racing	13	Jim Bown	4
Buick	Puskarich Racing	13	Darren Puskarich	1
Buick	Tidrick Racing	72	Brad Tidrick	5
Buick	Unknown	54	Norm Boucher	2
Buick	Unknown	57	Terry Fisher	3
Chevrolet	Al Rainwater	92	Ron Rainwater	4
Chevrolet	John & Terry Petris	12	Terry Petris	2
Chevrolet	Kanke-Price Racing	63	Bud Hickey	2
Chevrolet	Kanke-Price Racing	63	M. K. Kanke	1
Chevrolet	McCray Racing	08	Rick McCray	5
Chevrolet	Midgley Racing	29	George Follmer	2
Chevrolet	Schmitt Racing	70	Kenny Schmitt	2
Chevrolet	Schmitt Racing	70	Ron Esau	1
Chevrolet	Stoke Racing	93	Derrike Cope	1
Chevrolet	U. S. Racing	6	Ron Esau	1
Ford	Jefferson Racing	26	Chuck Little	1
Ford	Langley Racing	64	Rick McCray	2
Ford	McKnight Racing	83	Sumner McKnight	6
Ford	McKnight Racing	88	Mark Walbridge	2
Ford	McKnight Racing	88	Pat Mintey	1
Ford	Melling Racing	9	Bill Elliott	3
Ford	Razore Racing	19	Tobey Butler	1
Ford	Stroppe Motorsports	38	Tobey Butler	1
Ford	Unknown	44	Laury Cover	1
Oldsmobile	Boys Racing	69	Trevor Boys	2
Oldsmobile	Hamby Motorsports	12	Jim Bown	1
Oldsmobile	Hamby Motorsports	12	Trevor Boys	1
Oldsmobile	Larry Gaylord	68	Larry Gaylord	4
Oldsmobile	Oldsmobile Motorsports	89	Bob Howard	4
Pontiac	Curb Motorsports	98	Brad Noffsinger	2
Pontiac	Dave Phelps	16	Reno Fontana	2
Pontiac	Reno Fontana	16	Butch Gilliland	1
Buick 2 Chevrolet 2	Myung Suk Lee	45	Bob Kennedy	4
Buick 2 Chevrolet 2	Steurer Racing	18	Glen Steurer	4
Buick 4 Pontiac 2	Ray Kelly	74	Ray Kelly	6
Pontiac 2 Chevrolet 1	Kieper Racing	98	Derrike Cope	2
Pontiac 2 Chevrolet 1	Kieper Racing	98	Jim Bown	1

== Schedule and results ==
The 1987 season included 8 individual races, although Riverside International Raceway hosted two races. Both races at Riverside were in combination with the NASCAR Winston Cup Series.

Date	Name	Racetrack	Location	Winner
April 26	AC-Delco 200	Sears Point International Raceway	Sonoma, California	Hershel McGriff
June 21	Budweiser 400	Riverside International Raceway	Riverside, California	Tim Richmond
July 5	Budweiser 300	Spokane Grand Prix Course	Spokane, Washington	Roy Smith
July 12	Winston Washington 500	Evergreen Speedway	Monroe, Washington	Bill Elliott
August 2	Mike's Auto Parts/Winston 200	Portland Speedway	Portland, Oregon	Chad Little
August 9	Armed Forces 200	Tacoma Dome	Tacoma, Washington	Chad Little
September 20	American National Bank 200	Mesa Marin Raceway	Bakersfield, California	Hershel McGriff
November 8	Winston Western 500	Riverside International Raceway	Riverside, California	Rusty Wallace

== Full Drivers' Championship ==
(key) Bold – Pole position awarded by time. Italics – Pole position set by owner's points. * – Most laps led. † – Ineligible for West Series points

Pos	Driver	SON	RSD	SGP	EVG	POR	TAC	MMR	RSD	Pts
1	Chad Little	3	15	2	3	1*	1	2	15	412
2	Hershel McGriff	1*	12	5	17	**20**	9	1*	42	362
3	Roy Smith	21	39	1*	2	5	4	**19**	40	345
4	Ruben Garcia	6	19	10	12	8	7*	11	39	342
5	Bill Schmitt	14	33	4	7	4	17	4	36	342
6	Jim Robinson	16	36	18	5	2	14	3	12	339
7	Harry Goularte	7	20	15	10	17	8	12	32	330
8	John Krebs	8	29	9	9	23	5	14	DNQ	316
9	Roman Calczynski	9	DNQ	20	8	12	6	6		278
10	Jack Sellers	23	DNQ	7	13	21	12	15	DNQ	277
11	Rick McCray		26	6	15	22	10	18	35	273
12	St. James Davis	19	DNQ	12	21	19	16	16	DNQ	267
13	Sumner McKnight	2		3	24	6	2	7		262
14	J. C. Danielsen	4		14	20	3	18	10		237
15	Ray Kelly	10	DNQ	19	16	13	15			216
16	Jim Bown	**22**	31		25	24	21	9		197
17	Brad Tidrick			17	23	9	13	8		185
18	Glen Steurer	17					**3**	5	41	168
19	Derrike Cope				4	18			20	151
20	Ron Rainwater	5		13	29		19			138
21	Larry Gaylord			8	19	16	25			136
22	Bob Howard	11					23	13	DNQ	136
23	Bob Kennedy	12		21	22			20		129
24	Terry Fisher			11		14	11			118
25	Ron Eaton				18	7	24			104
26	George Follmer		40						16	87
27	Trevor Boys				6	11			DNQ	85
28	Mark Walbridge				11	15				76
29	Bud Hickey					10	20			72
30	Terry Petris	13						21		68
31	Brad Noffsinger							17	DNQ	67
32	Bill Elliott		5†		**1***				23†	60
33	Jeff Barrister	15								58
34	Reno Fontana						22		DNQ	58
35	Norm Boucher	18			27					57
36	Kenny Schmitt			22			27			53
37	Tommy Kendall								38	43
38	Gordy Oberg				14					37
39	Darren Puskarich			16						35
40	Dave Byrd	20								31
41	Butch Gilliland							22		29
42	Laury Cover			23						28
43	Troy Beebe							23		28
44	M. K. Kanke							24		27
45	Tobey Butler			24	26					25
46	Pat Mintey						26			25
47	Ron Esau		22		28					23
48	Steve Hurley				30					21
49	Chuck Little			25						0

== See also ==
- 1987 NASCAR Winston Cup Series
- 1987 NASCAR Busch Grand National North Series
