= 1986 Canadian Players 500 =

Fourth race of the 1986 NASCAR Winston West Series

Race details
- Race 4 of 8 in the 1986 NASCAR Winston West Series season
- Location: Race City Speedway in Calgary, Alberta
- Course: Permanent racing facility
- Course length: 0.420 miles (0.676 km)
- Distance: 500 laps, 210.00 mi (337.96 km)
- Average speed: 66.631 miles per hour (107.232 km/h)

Pole position
Driver	Bill Schmitt	Schmitt Racing Enterprises

Most laps led
Driver	Bill Schmitt	Schmitt Racing Enterprises
- Laps: 467

Winner
No. 73	Bill Schmitt	Schmitt Racing Enterprises

The 1986 Canadian Players 500, also referred to as the Canadian 500 or Players 500, was the 4th stock car race of the 1986 NASCAR Winston West Series season. The race was held on Sunday, August 3, 1986, at Race City Speedway, a 0.420 mile (0.676 km) oval shaped racetrack. The race took the scheduled 500 laps to complete. Bill Schmitt won the race, his first and only win of the season. Multiple of Schmitt's closest competitors, such as Hershel McGriff and Terry Petris, were eliminated in accidents, and Schmitt would ultimately win with a margin of 7 laps over second place Chad Little. Canadian driver Billy Hitchcox would finish third, and Jim Robinson and John Krebs rounded out the top five. This race would be the last Winston West race to take place in Canada.

== Report ==
=== Background ===
Race City Motorsport Park, also known as Race City or Race City Speedway, was a multi-track auto racing facility located in Calgary, Alberta, Canada. The facility featured a ¼ mile dragstrip, a 3.2 km (2.0 mi) 11-turn road course, and a ½ mile paved short oval.

==== Entry list ====
No.	Driver	Owner	Manufacturer
3	Kenny Schmitt	Bill Schmitt	Chevrolet
4	Bob Howard	Bob Howard	Oldsmobile
04	Hershel McGriff	Gary Smith	Pontiac
6	Chuck Little	George Jefferson	Ford
12	Terry Petris	John & Terry Petris	Chevrolet
14	Laury Cover	Unknown	Ford
18	Glen Steurer	Glen Steurer	Chevrolet
22	St. James Davis	LaDonna Davis	Buick
24	Buddie Boys	Buddie Boys	Pontiac
26	Chad Little	George Jefferson	Chevrolet
27	Bobby Schukar	Dick Midgley	Chevrolet
27X	Doug Rutz	Unknown	Pontiac
32	Ruben Garcia	Fred Stoke	Chevrolet
33	John Krebs	John Krebs	Oldsmobile
41	Jack Sellers	Sara Vincent	Chevrolet
44	Billy Hitchcox	Unknown	Oldsmobile
72	Brad Tidrick	Cindi Tidrick	Buick
73	Bill Schmitt	Bill Schmitt	Chevrolet
78	Jim Robinson	Lois Williams	Oldsmobile
97	Mike Van Amberg	Unknown	Pontiac
98	Garrett Evans	John Kieper	Chevrolet
99	Mike Chase	Fred Stoke	Chevrolet

== Qualifying ==
Bill Schmitt started the race on pole with an average speed of 86.728 mph.

== Race results ==
Fin	St	#	Driver	Owner	Make	Laps	Led	Status	Pts
1	1	73	Bill Schmitt	Bill Schmitt	Chevrolet	500	467	Running	60
2	5	26	Chad Little	George Jefferson	Chevrolet	493	0	Running	49
3	10	44	Billy Hitchcox	Unknown	Oldsmobile	490	0	Running	48
4	9	78	Jim Robinson	Lois Williams	Oldsmobile	486	0	Running	47
5	11	33	John Krebs	John Krebs	Oldsmobile	478	0	Running	46
6	7	32	Ruben Garcia	Fred Stoke	Chevrolet	443	0	Rear End	45
7	2	98	Garrett Evans	John Kieper	Pontiac	384	0	Accident	44
8	15	97	Mike Van Amberg	Unknown	Pontiac	384	0	Running	0
9	12	24	Buddie Boys	Buddie Boys	Pontiac	373	0	Running	43
10	3	99	Mike Chase	Fred Stoke	Chevrolet	351	0	Rear End	42
11	22	27X	Doug Rutz	Unknown	Pontiac	284	0	Engine	0
12	20	14	Laury Cover	Unknown	Ford	252	0	Engine	0
13	6	18	Glen Steurer	Glen Steurer	Chevrolet	221	0	Ignition	41
14	16	41	Jack Sellers	Sara Vincent	Chevrolet	192	0	Overheating	40
15	8	12	Terry Petris	John & Terry Petris	Chevrolet	175	0	Accident	39
16	14	72	Brad Tidrick	Cindi Tidrick	Buick	155	0	Accident	38
17	17	04	Hershel McGriff	Gary Smith	Pontiac	97	33	Accident	42
18	21	27	Bobby Schukar	Dick Midgley	Chevrolet	93	0	Accident	0
19	13	4	Bob Howard	Bob Howard	Oldsmobile	39	0	Engine	36
20	17	22	St. James Davis	LaDonna Davis	Buick	3	0	Engine	35
21	18	3	Kenny Schmitt	Bill Schmitt	Chevrolet	2	0	Ignition	0
22	19	6	Chuck Little	George Jefferson	Ford	2	0	Ignition	0

== Standings after the race ==
	Pos	Driver	Points
	1	Chad Little	209
2	2	Bill Schmitt	202 (-7)
	3	Jim Robinson	194 (-15)
2	4	Terry Petris	187 (-22)
1	5	Hershel McGriff	182 (-27)
1	6	Glen Steurer	182 (-27)
	7	Ruben Garcia	169 (-40)
1	8	John Krebs	151 (-58)
2	9	Brad Tidrick	117 (-92)
2	10	Ray Kelly	114 (-95)

- Note: Only the first 10 positions are included for the driver standings.

Previous race: 1986 Peterbilt Winston Washington 500	NASCAR Winston West Series; 1986 season	Next race: 1986 Shuck's Tacoma Grand Prix 200
