= 1987 Budweiser 300 =

3rd race of the 1987 NASCAR Winston West Series

Race details
- Race 3 of 8 in the 1987 NASCAR Winston West Series season
- Location: Spokane Grand Prix Course in Spokane, Washington
- Course: Permanent racing facility
- Course length: 1.650 miles (2.656 km)
- Distance: 100 laps, 165.00 mi (265.54 km)
- Average speed: 55.392 miles per hour (89.145 km/h)

Pole position
Driver	Hershel McGriff	Gary Smith Racing

Most laps led
Driver	Roy Smith	Razore Racing
- Laps: 26

Winner
No. 79	Roy Smith	Razore Racing

The 1987 Budweiser 300, also known as the Budweiser Spokane Grand Prix, was the 3rd stock car race of the 1987 NASCAR Winston West Series season. The race was held on Sunday, July 5, 1987, on a 1.650 mile (2.656 km) street course in Spokane, Washington, laid out around the 1974 World's Fair. The race took the scheduled 100 laps to complete. Roy Smith won the race, his first and only win of the season. Smith won the race by 3.7 seconds over Chad Little. Sumner McKnight, Bill Schmitt, and Hershel McGriff rounded out the top five. The race was the first of two to take place in the streets of Spokane.

== Report ==
=== Background ===
The race circuit was laid out around the 1974 World's Fair and spanned 1.650 miles. The Spokane course also hosted races for open wheel cars.

==== Entry list ====
No.	Driver	Owner	Manufacturer
04	Hershel McGriff	Gary Smith	Pontiac
7	Kenny Schmitt	Kenny Schmitt	Chevrolet
08	Rick McCray	Rick McCray	Chevrolet
13	Darren Puskarich	Unknown	Buick
17	Harry Goularte	Jim Whalen/Harry Goularte	Chevrolet
22	St. James Davis	LaDonna Davis	Buick
26	Chuck Little	George Jefferson	Ford
32	Ruben Garcia	Fred Stoke	Chevrolet
33	John Krebs	John Krebs	Oldsmobile
38	Tobey Butler	Bill Stroppe	Ford
41	Jack Sellers	Sara Vincent	Chevrolet
44	Laury Cover	Unknown	Ford
45	Bob Kennedy	Myung Suk Lee	Buick
57	Terry Fisher	Unknown	Buick
68	Larry Gaylord	Larry Gaylord	Oldsmobile
72	Brad Tidrick	Cindi Tidrick	Buick
73	Bill Schmitt	Bill Schmitt	Chevrolet
74	Ray Kelly	Ray Kelly	Buick
75	Roman Calczynski	Wayne Spears	Buick
78	Jim Robinson	Lois Williams	Oldsmobile
79	Roy Smith	Warren Razore	Ford
82	J. C. Danielsen	Shirnell Gautsche	Buick
83	Sumner McKnight	Sumner McKnight	Ford
92	Ron Rainwater	Al Rainwater	Chevrolet
95	Chad Little	George Jefferson	Ford

== Race results ==
Fin	St	#	Driver	Owner	Make	Laps	Led	Status	Pts
1	10	79	Roy Smith	Warren Razore	Ford	100	26	Running	60
2	2	95	Chad Little	George Jefferson	Ford	100	21	Running	49
3	13	83	Sumner McKnight	Sumner McKnight	Ford	100	15	Running	48
4	6	73	Bill Schmitt	Bill Schmitt	Chevrolet	98	0	Running	47
5	1	04	Hershel McGriff	Gary Smith	Pontiac	96	3	Running	46
6	20	08	Rick McCray	Rick McCray	Chevrolet	94	0	Running	45
7	12	41	Jack Sellers	Sara Vincent	Chevrolet	91	0	Running	44
8	21	68	Larry Gaylord	Larry Gaylord	Oldsmobile	91	0	Running	43
9	5	33	John Krebs	John Krebs	Oldsmobile	86	0	Running	42
10	3	32	Ruben Garcia	Fred Stoke	Chevrolet	86	6	Running	41
11	19	57	Terry Fisher	Unknown	Buick	80	0	Running	40
12	11	22	St. James Davis	LaDonna Davis	Buick	71	0	Running	39
13	15	92	Ron Rainwater	Al Rainwater	Chevrolet	68	0	Running	38
14	14	82	J. C. Danielsen	Shirnell Gautsche	Buick	66	0	Rear End	37
15	4	17	Harry Goularte	Jim Whalen/Harry Goularte	Chevrolet	66	0	Running	36
16	17	13	Darren Puskarich	Unknown	Buick	65	0	Oil Leak	35
17	18	72	Brad Tidrick	Cindi Tidrick	Buick	65	0	Running	34
18	7	78	Jim Robinson	Lois Williams	Oldsmobile	64	10	Transmission	33
19	9	74	Ray Kelly	Ray Kelly	Buick	61	0	Rear End	32
20	8	75	Roman Calczynski	Wayne Spears	Buick	44	0	Valve	31
21	16	45	Bob Kennedy	Myung Suk Lee	Buick	23	0	Clutch	30
22	22	7	Kenny Schmitt	Kenny Schmitt	Chevrolet	2	0	Handling	29
23	24	44	Laury Cover	Unknown	Ford	2	0	Overheating	0
24	25	38	Tobey Butler	Bill Stroppe	Ford	2	0	Handling	0
25	23	26	Chuck Little	George Jefferson	Ford	0	0	Accident	0

- Note: Not all laps led are accounted for

== Standings after the race ==
	Pos	Driver	Points
	1	Hershel McGriff	156
	2	Chad Little	146 (-10)
	3	Ruben Garcia	134 (-22)
5	4	Roy Smith	130 (-26)
	5	John Krebs	129 (-27)
2	6	Harry Goularte	127 (-29)
1	7	Bill Schmitt	126 (-30)
1	8	Jim Robinson	109 (-47)
1	9	Sumner McKnight	97 (-59)
4	10	Rick McCray	90 (-66)

- Note: Only the first 10 positions are included for the driver standings.

Previous race: 1987 Budweiser 400	NASCAR Winston West Series; 1987 season	Next race: 1987 Winston Washington 500
