= 1986 NASCAR Winston West Series =

33rd season of the NASCAR Winston West Series

Seasons
- ← 1985 1987 →

The 1986 NASCAR Winston West Series was the 33rd season of the series. The title was won by Hershel McGriff, his first in the series.

== Teams and drivers ==
=== Complete schedule ===
Manufacturer	Team	No.	Driver
Buick	St. James Racing	22	St. James Davis
Chevrolet	Schmitt Racing	73	Bill Schmitt
Chevrolet	Stoke Racing	32	Ruben Garcia
Ford	Jefferson Racing	26	Chad Little
Oldsmobile	KC Racing	33	John Krebs
Oldsmobile	Lois Williams	78	Jim Robinson
Pontiac	Gary Smith	04	Hershel McGriff
Chevrolet 7 Buick 1	Steurer Racing	18	Glen Steurer
Chevrolet 6 Oldsmobile 2	John & Terry Petris	12	Terry Petris
Chevrolet 7 Oldsmobile 1	Stoke Racing	99	Ted Kennedy 3
Chevrolet 7 Oldsmobile 1	Stoke Racing	99	Mike Chase 3
Chevrolet 7 Oldsmobile 1	Stoke Racing	99	Richard Lach 1
Chevrolet 7 Oldsmobile 1	Stoke Racing	99	Blair Aiken 1

=== Partial schedule ===
Manufacturer	Team	No.	Driver	Races
Buick	AFR Racing	1	Jeff Barrister	1
Buick	Archie Somers	02	Jim Bown	2
Buick	Beebe Racing	93	Troy Beebe	3
Buick	Bill Osborne	35	Bill Osborne	1
Buick	Eaton Racing	7	Ron Eaton	2
Buick	Gautsche Racing	82	J. C. Danielsen	4
Buick	Gordy Oberg	0	Gordy Oberg	1
Buick	Gordy Oberg	06	Steve Hurley	1
Buick	Goularte Racing	17	Harry Goularte	3
Buick	McCray Racing	08	Rick McCray	2
Buick	Sedgwick Racing	25	Bill Sedgwick	1
Buick	Stoke Racing	77	Richard Lach	1
Buick	Thonesen Racing	10	Gene Thonesen	1
Buick	Tidrick Racing	72	Brad Tidrick	7
Buick	Unknown	57	Terry Fisher	1
Buick	Unknown	69	Brent Kaeding	1
Chevrolet	Al Rainwater	92	Ron Rainwater	5
Chevrolet	Branch-Ragan Racing	48	Ron Esau	1
Chevrolet	Hylton Motorsports	48	Ron Esau	1
Chevrolet	Kieper Racing	98	Garrett Evans	2
Chevrolet	Kieper Racing	98	Jim Bown	2
Chevrolet	Kieper Racing	98	Gary Johnson	1
Chevrolet	Kieper Racing	98	Jimmy Insolo	1
Chevrolet	Myunk Suk Lee	45	Bob Kennedy	6
Chevrolet	Pat Mintey	35	Pat Mintey	5
Chevrolet	Pat Mintey	35	Jimmy Insolo	1
Chevrolet	Sara Vincent	41	Jack Sellers	5
Chevrolet	Sara Vincent	41	Kenny Schmitt	1
Chevrolet	Schmitt Racing	3	Kenny Schmitt	2
Chevrolet	Unknown	77	Tony Heckart	1
Ford	Jefferson Racing	6	Chuck Little	1
Ford	Kord Racing	94	John Soares Jr.	2
Ford	Langley Racing	64	Rick McCray	1
Ford	McKnight Racing	83	Sumner McKnight	4
Ford	Melling Racing	9	Bill Elliott	3
Ford	Razore Racing	79	Derrike Cope	6
Ford	Unknown	14	Laury Cover	1
Oldsmobile	Bob Howard	4	Bob Howard	5
Oldsmobile	KC Racing	91	Vince Bellotti	1
Oldsmobile	Larry Gaylord	68	Larry Gaylord	4
Oldsmobile	Unknown	44	Billy Hitchcox	3
Pontiac	Buddie Boys	24	Buddie Boys	1
Pontiac	Ray Kelly	74	Ray Kelly	4
Pontiac	Unknown	27	Doug Rutz	2
Pontiac	Unknown	84	Bud Hickey	3
Pontiac	Unknown	97	Mike Van Amberg	1
Chevrolet 4 Oldsmobile 1	Midgley Racing	29	Bobby Schukar	2
Chevrolet 4 Oldsmobile 1	Midgley Racing	29	George Follmer	2
Chevrolet 4 Oldsmobile 1	Midgley Racing	29	Scott Autrey	1

== Schedule and results ==
The 1986 season included 8 individual races, although Riverside International Raceway hosted two races. Both races at Riverside were in combination with the NASCAR Winston Cup Series.

Date	Name	Racetrack	Location	Winner
April 27	AC-Delco 300	Sears Point International Raceway	Sonoma, California	Jim Robinson
June 1	Budweiser 400	Riverside International Raceway	Riverside, California	Darrell Waltrip
July 13	Peterbilt Winston Washington 500	Evergreen Speedway	Monroe, Washington	Chad Little
August 3	Canadian Players 500	Race City Speedway	Calgary, Alberta	Bill Schmitt
August 10	Schuck's Tacoma Grand Prix 200	Tacoma Dome	Tacoma, Washington	Hershel McGriff
August 24	Motorcraft 300	Portland International Raceway	Portland, Oregon	Hershel McGriff
September 28	Suncrest Motorhomes 200	Willow Springs Speedway	Lancaster, California	Hershel McGriff
November 16	Winston Western 500	Riverside International Raceway	Riverside, California	Tim Richmond

== Full Drivers' Championship ==
(key) Bold – Pole position awarded by time. Italics – Pole position set by owner's points. * – Most laps led. † – Ineligible for West Series points

Pos	Driver	SON	RSD	EVG	RCS	TAC	PIR	WSR	RSD	Pts
1	Hershel McGriff	**6**	28	3	17	1	1*	1*	26	408
2	Chad Little	5	13	1	2	10	5	5	35	392
3	Bill Schmitt	3	18	8	**1***	13	4	17	14	376
4	Jim Robinson	1*	15	12	4	19	6	6	25	368
5	Terry Petris	2	24	6	15	4	13	8	34	366
6	Ruben Garcia	4	30	20	6	18	2	3	22	357
7	Glen Steurer	7	10	9	13	20	28	4	16	342
8	John Krebs	21	26	19	5	6	17	10	42	308
9	Derrike Cope		31	21		**2***	**3**	**2**	41	269
10	Brad Tidrick	13		10	16	8	18	11	DNQ	261
11	St. James Davis	22	DNQ	26	20	25	29	24	DNQ	221
12	Pat Mintey	16		13		7	11	9		199
13	J. C. Danielsen			11		5	9	12		190
14	Bob Howard	14		25	19		16	14		171
15	Bob Kennedy	15		22		14	27	15	DNQ	162
16	Ron Rainwater	11				17	7	19	DNQ	150
17	Jack Sellers			17	14	23	26		DNQ	150
18	Jim Bown			18			24	7	32	146
19	Ray Kelly	10	36	16					DNQ	140
20	Larry Gaylord			24		12	12	16		140
21	Mike Chase			7	10			18		124
22	Sumner McKnight	17		23		22	20			121
23	Ted Kennedy		23			21			30	119
24	Bud Hickey					16	10	13		114
25	Billy Hitchcox			14	3	26				110
26	Harry Goularte	19					8		DNQ	107
27	Troy Beebe					3	25	22		102
28	Garrett Evans			5	7					90
29	Ron Eaton			4		11				87
30	Richard Lach	8	40							79
31	Rick McCray		37	15					28	73
32	George Follmer						22		36	67
33	Gordy Oberg					9				60
34	Bill Elliott		11†	**2***					23†	54
35	Buddie Boys				9					43
36	Scott Autrey	9								42
37	Brent Kaeding	12								39
38	Bill Osborne		35							39
39	Blair Aiken						14			37
40	Steve Hurley					15				36
41	John Soares Jr.						15		DNQ	36
42	Gene Thonesen	18								33
43	Terry Fisher						19			32
44	Gary Johnson	20								31
45	Marta Leonard		DNQ							31
46	Bill Sedgwick							20		31
47	Kenny Schmitt				21	24		21		30
48	Jimmy Insolo						21		DNQ	29
49	Kevin Terris								DNQ	29
50	Jeff Barrister							23		28
51	Vince Bellotti	23								22
	Ron Esau		19						33	47
	Doug Rutz			28	11					
	Bobby Schukar			27	14					
	Mike Van Amberg				8					
	Laury Cover				12					
	Chuck Little				22					
	Tony Heckart						23			

== See also ==
- 1986 NASCAR Winston Cup Series
