= Terry Petris =

American racing driver (1961–2020)

- Born: Terry Jon Petris; June 28, 1961; Kern County, California, U.S.
- Died: December 21, 2020 (aged 59); Bakersfield, California, U.S.

NASCAR Cup Series career
- 3 races run over 2 years
- Best finish: 80th (1986)
- First race: 1986 Budweiser 400 (Riverside)
- Last race: 1988 Budweiser 400 (Riverside)
Wins	Top tens	Poles
0	0	0

ARCA Menards Series West career
- 19 races run over 5 years
- Best finish: 5th (1986)
- First race: 1984 Suncrest Motorhomes 200 (Mesa Marin)
- Last race: 1988 American National Bank 200 (Mesa Marin)
Wins	Top tens	Poles
0	5	1
- Statistics up to date as of September 28, 2026.

Terry Jon Petris (June 28, 1961 – December 21, 2020) was an American professional stock car racing driver. He primarily competed in the NASCAR Winston West Series between 1984 and 1988.

== Racing career ==
Petris competed in the Copper World Classic at Phoenix International Raceway in 1983, finishing 27th; he ran the race three more times with a best finish of fifth in 1984. Petris made his NASCAR Winston West Series debut in 1984, finishing seventeenth at Mesa Marin Raceway and twentieth at Phoenix, having issues in both events. He competed in two Winston West races at Mesa Marin in 1985, winning the pole but finishing eighteenth due to engine issues in June and failing to complete any laps in October due to the same issue. Petris competed full-time in 1986, running all eight races and scoring four top-tens, including a runner-up finish in the season opener at Sears Point International Raceway. He finished fifth in the standings. Two races, both at Riverside International Raceway, were in combination with the NASCAR Winston Cup Series, where he crashed and finished 24th in he first race and finished 34th due to water pump issues in the second race. Petris ran two Winston West races in 1987, finishing thirteenth at Sears Point and 21st at Mesa Marin. He also made a NASCAR Featherlite Southwest Tour start at Mesa Marin, finishing seventh. Petris made five Winston West starts in 1988, scoring his final career top-ten at Mesa Marin with a seventh-place finish. In the combination race at Riverside, he finished 35th due to a ball joint issue. He competed in the 1988 Goodyear NASCAR 500 at Australia's Calder Park Thunderdome, finishing seventh of 32 cars.

== Personal life ==
Petris was born to John and Joyce Petris on June 28, 1961. He attended Garces High School, where he placed football and baseball. Petris was married to Lori Petris and the couple had four children.

== Motorsports career results ==
=== NASCAR ===
(key) (Bold – Pole position awarded by qualifying time. Italics – Pole position earned by points standings or practice time. * – Most laps led.)

==== Winston Cup Series ====
NASCAR Winston Cup Series results
Year	Team	No.	Make	1	2	3	4	5	6	7	8	9	10	11	12	13	14	15	16	17	18	19	20	21	22	23	24	25	26	27	28	29	NWCSC	Pts	Ref
1986	Terry Petris	62	Chevy	DAY	RCH	CAR	ATL	BRI	DAR	NWS	MAR	TAL	DOV	CLT	RSD; 24	POC	MCH	DAY	POC	TAL	GLN	MCH	BRI	DAR	RCH	DOV	MAR	NWS	CLT	CAR	ATL	RSD; 34	80th	152	
1988	Terry Petris	62	Chevy	DAY	RCH	CAR	ATL	DAR	BRI	NWS	MAR	TAL	CLT	DOV	RSD; 35	POC	MCH	DAY	POC	TAL	GLN	MCH	BRI	DAR	RCH	DOV	MAR	CLT	NWS	CAR	PHO	ATL	NA	NA	

==== Winston West Series ====
NASCAR Winston West Series results
Year	Team	No.	Make	1	2	3	4	5	6	7	8	9	10	11	12	NWWSC	Pts	Ref
1984	John & Terry Petris	12	Olds	RSD	YAK	SIR	POR	EVG	SHA	WSR	SON	MMR; 17	RSD	PHO; 20		28th	65	
1985	John & Terry Petris	12	Chevy	SON	SHA	RSD	**MMR**; 18	SIR	POR	STA	YAK	EVG	WSR	MMR; 23	RSD	49th	33	
1986	John & Terry Petris	12	Chevy	SON; 2		EVG; 6	RCS; 15									5th	366	
1986	John & Terry Petris	62	Chevy		RSD; 24						RSD; 34					5th	366	
1986	John & Terry Petris	12	Olds					TAC; 4	PIR; 13	WSR; 8						5th	366	
1987	John & Terry Petris	12	Chevy	SON; 13	RSD	SGP	EVG	POR	TAC	MMR; 21	RSD					30th	68	
1988	John & Terry Petris	12	Chevy	SON; 23	MMR; 7					MMR; 15	PHO					18th	178	
1988	John & Terry Petris	62	Chevy			RSD; 35	SGP	POR								18th	178	
1988	John & Terry Petris	95	Ford						EVG; 26							18th	178	
