= 1985 NASCAR Winston West Series =

32nd season of the NASCAR Winston West Series

Seasons
- ← 1984 1986 →

The 1985 NASCAR Winston West Series was the 32nd season of the series. The title was won by Jim Robinson, his third in the series and third in succession.

== Teams and drivers ==
=== Complete schedule ===
Manufacturer	Team	No.	Driver
Buick	Bill Osborne/Wayne Hackman	16	Bill Osborne
Chevrolet	Schmitt Racing	73	Bill Schmitt
Chevrolet	Stoke Racing	32	Ruben Garcia
Chevrolet	Stoke Racing	99	Blair Aiken
Chrysler	St. James Racing	22	St. James Davis
Ford	Jefferson Racing	07	Derrike Cope
Oldsmobile	Lois Williams	78	Jim Robinson
Pontiac	Gary Smith	04	Hershel McGriff
Pontiac	John Soares Jr./Mike Kard	94	John Soares Jr.
Buick 6 Chevrolet 6	Steurer Racing	18	Glen Steurer

=== Partial schedule ===
Manufacturer	Team	No.	Driver	Races
Buick	AFR Racing	1	Jeff Barrister	3
Buick	Eaton Racing	7	Ron Eaton	3
Buick	Gordy Oberg	0	Gordy Oberg	1
Buick	Goularte Racing	17	Harry Goularte	1
Buick	Kennell Racing	88	Tim Kennell	1
Buick	Kennell Racing	88	Tim Levine	1
Buick	Kramer Racing	71	Randy Becker	1
Buick	Petris Racing	63	Dale Perry	2
Buick	Petris Racing	63	Jim Bown (Note: Bown ran the full schedule split between Myunk Suk Lee's No. 45, the Petris Racing No. 63, the Tidrick Racing No. 72, and the Kieper Racing No. 98 entries)	1
Buick	Sedgwick Racing	25	Bill Sedgwick	3
Buick	Tidrick Racing	72	Brad Tidrick	5
Buick	Tidrick Racing	72	Jim Bown	1
Buick	Tidrick Racing	72	Billy Benge	1
Buick	Thonesen Racing	10	Gene Thonesen	4
Buick	Unknown	2	Don Waterman	1
Chevrolet	Al Rainwater	90	Bob Fox	4
Chevrolet	Buddie Boys Racing	29	Buddie Boys	1
Chevrolet	Hylton Motorsports	49	Ron Esau	1
Chevrolet	John & Terry Petris	12	Terry Petris	2
Chevrolet	JPW Racing	45	Rick McCray	2
Chevrolet	Myunk Suk Lee	45	Bob Kennedy	6
Chevrolet	Myunk Suk Lee	45	Jim Bown	2
Chevrolet	Myunk Suk Lee	45	Ron Daniels	1
Chevrolet	Pat Mintey	35	Pat Mintey	6
Chevrolet	Pat Mintey	35	Bud Hickey	3
Chevrolet	Pat Mintey	35	Troy Beebe	1
Chevrolet	Rich Olson	28	Randy Olson	1
Chevrolet	Schmitt Racing	3	Dale Earnhardt	1
Chevrolet	Thirkettle Racing	5	Jim Thirkettle	1
Chevrolet	Unknown	77	Tony Heckart	1
Ford	McKnight Racing	83	Sumner McKnight	7
Ford	Melling Racing	9	Bill Elliott	3
Oldsmobile	Jefferson Racing	26	Chad Little	4
Oldsmobile	KC Racing	91	John Krebs	5
Oldsmobile	KC Racing	91	Jack Sellers	4
Oldsmobile	KC Racing	91	Steve Pfeifer	1
Oldsmobile	Larry Gaylord	68	Frank Pool	1
Oldsmobile	Larry Gaylord	68	Larry Gaylord	1
Oldsmobile	Midgely Racing	29	Scott Autrey	5
Oldsmobile	Sellers Racing	6	Jack Sellers	1
Oldsmobile	Unknown	44	Billy Hitchcox	3
Pontiac	Francis Racing	03	Glenn Francis	1
Pontiac	Kanke Racing	33	M. K. Kanke	3
Pontiac	Miller Racing	51	Scott Miller	1
Buick 5 Chevrolet 3	Kieper Racing	98	Jim Bown	8
Chevrolet 2 Chrysler 1	Golden West Racing	42	Kevin Terris	3
Chrysler 4 Buick 1	Skip Tarter	9	J. C. Danielsen	5
Chrysler 2 Dodge 1	Norm Palmer	93	Norm Palmer	3
Pontiac 3 Buick 1	Ray Kelly	74	Ray Kelly	4

== Schedule and results ==
The 1985 season included 12 individual races, although Riverside International Raceway and Mesa Marin Raceway hosted two races each. The races at Riverside were in combination with the NASCAR Winston Cup Series.

Date	Name	Racetrack	Location	Winner
April 28	AC-Delco 200	Sears Point International Raceway	Sonoma, California	Hershel McGriff
May 11	Pepsi-Cola 150	Shasta Speedway	Anderson, California	Jim Robinson
June 2	Budweiser 400	Riverside International Raceway	Riverside, California	Terry Labonte
June 8	Suncrest Motorhomes 200	Mesa Marin Raceway	Bakersfield, California	Ruben Garcia
June 23	Stroh's Beer 200	Seattle International Raceway	Kent, Washington	Dale Earnhardt
July 4	G.I. Joe's/Valvoline 201	Portland Speedway	Portland, Oregon	Jim Bown
July 7	Off-Broadway 150	Northwest Speedway	Stateline, Idaho	Jim Robinson
July 13	Sunfair Chevy/Lynch Olds 150	Yakima Speedway	Yakima, Washington	Hershel McGriff
August 18	Winston Washington 500	Evergreen Speedway	Monroe, Washington	Derrike Cope
September 29	Suncrest Motorhomes 200	Willow Springs Speedway	Lancaster, California	Hershel McGriff
October 5	Timec 200	Mesa Marin Raceway	Bakersfield, California	Ruben Garcia
November 17	Winston Western 500	Riverside International Raceway	Riverside, California	Ricky Rudd

== Full Drivers' Championship ==
(key) Bold – Pole position awarded by time. Italics – Pole position set by owner's points. * – Most laps led. † – Ineligible for West Series points

Pos	Driver	SON	SHA	RSD	MMR	SIR	POR	STA	YAK	EVG	WSR	MMR	RSD	Pts
1	Jim Robinson	2	1*	13	3	2	2	1*	3	15	2	13	12	584
2	Hershel McGriff	**1***	2	29	2*	**19**	3*	6	**1***	2	1*	**21**	26	565
3	Ruben Garcia	12	15	23	1	11	10	2	2	3	**3**	1*	14	561
4	Glen Steurer	3	5	11	14	4	4	10	7	8	7	3	11	543
5	Blair Aiken	7	4	38	7	8	8	5	9	7	9	7	29	518
6	Jim Bown	4	**7**	28	4	7	**1**	15	5	27	12	14	16	511
7	Bill Osborne	8	14	21	15	5	5	3	8	26	4	4	24	506
8	Bill Schmitt	11	3	34	6	18	20	16	6	5	14	2	15	494
9	Derrike Cope	5	13	15	20	3	15	**17**	13	1*	15	18	19	492
10	John Soares Jr.	21	9	19	10	10	14	7	11	18	18	9	30	470
11	St. James Davis	14	16	DNQ	19	14	19	9	12	28	22	22	DNQ	393
12	Sumner McKnight	15	8	14	8					21	5	15		282
13	Bob Kennedy	10				6	9		10	22	11			276
14	Scott Autrey	16				17				9	10		34	192
15	Pat Mintey	18	11	DNQ	17					14	6			189
16	Brad Tidrick					16	13	4	4	31				187
17	Jack Sellers	20					11	12		19		11		182
18	J. C. Danielsen				11	12	18	13		20				181
19	Bob Fox					9	6	11		10				166
20	John Krebs	17	6	26	12						DNQ			160
21	Gene Thonesen	9	10		9						21			155
22	Ray Kelly									17	8	8	DNQ	150
23	Chad Little							14		30	20	17		123
24	Bud Hickey					13	7						38	121
25	Billy Hitchcox									13	17	5		118
26	Ron Eaton					20	17			**6**				110
27	M. K. Kanke				5						23	16		109
28	Jeff Barrister	13									13		DNQ	105
29	Bill Sedgwick				16						19	19		99
30	Kevin Terris	19									16		DNQ	98
31	Norm Palmer			39							24		DNQ	95
32	Dale Perry			30				8						82
33	Dale Earnhardt			40†		1*							5†	60
34	Don Waterman									4				47
35	Billy Benge											6		45
36	Glenn Francis			20										45
37	Harry Goularte	6												45
38	Tony Heckart									11				40
39	Randy Becker									12				39
40	Troy Beebe											12		39
41	Randy Olson		12											39
42	Frank Pool						12							39
43	Ron Daniels				13									38
44	Rick McCray			41									39	38
45	Ron Esau												41	37
46	Steve Pfeifer					15								36
47	Larry Gaylord									16				35
48	Tim Kennell					16								35
49	Terry Petris				**18**							23		33
50	Gordy Oberg									23				28
51	Tim Levine									24				27
52	Bill Elliott			6†						25			31†	26
53	Buddie Boys									29				22
	Scott Miller											10		41
	Jim Thirkettle											20		31

== See also ==
- 1985 NASCAR Winston Cup Series
