= 1988 Budweiser 400 =

12th race of the 1988 NASCAR Winston Cup Series

Race details
- Race 12 of 29 in the 1988 NASCAR Winston Cup Series
- The 1988 Budweiser 400 program cover, featuring Terry Labonte.
- Date: June 12, 1988
- Official name: 20th Annual Budweiser 400
- Location: Riverside International Raceway, Riverside, California
- Course: Permanent racing facility
- Course length: 2.62 miles (4.216 km)
- Distance: 95 laps, 248.9 mi (400.565 km)
- Scheduled distance: 95 laps, 248.9 mi (400.565 km)
- Average speed: 88.341 miles per hour (142.171 km/h)
- Attendance: 75,000

Pole position
Driver	Ricky Rudd	King Racing
- Time: 1:19.606

Most laps led
Driver	Rusty Wallace	Blue Max Racing
- Laps: 45

Winner
No. 27	Rusty Wallace	Blue Max Racing

Television in the United States
- Network: ESPN
- Announcers: Bob Jenkins, Ned Jarrett

Radio in the United States
- Radio: Motor Racing Network

The 1988 Budweiser 400 was the 12th stock car race of the 1988 NASCAR Winston Cup Series season, the third race of the 1988 NASCAR Winston West Series, and the 20th and final iteration of the event. The race was held on Sunday, June 12, 1988, before an audience of 72,000 in Riverside, California, at the short layout of Riverside International Raceway, a 2.62 miles (4.22 km) permanent road course layout at the track. The race took the scheduled 95 laps to complete. Following an initial scoring error, Blue Max Racing driver Rusty Wallace would manage to pull away on the final restart with five laps left in the race to take his fifth career NASCAR Winston Cup Series victory and his first victory of the season. To fill out the top three, Junior Johnson & Associates driver Terry Labonte and King Racing driver Ricky Rudd would finish second and third, respectively.

The race was the final NASCAR Winston Cup Series race held at Riverside International Raceway before the track's closure in 1989.

== Background ==
The layout of Riverside International Raceway, the venue where the race was held.

Riverside International Raceway (sometimes known as Riverside, RIR, or Riverside Raceway) was a motorsports race track and road course established in the Edgemont area of Riverside County, California, just east of the city limits of Riverside and 50 mi (80 km) east of Los Angeles, in 1957. In 1984, the raceway became part of the newly incorporated city of Moreno Valley. Riverside was noted for its hot, dusty environment and for being somewhat of a complicated and dangerous track for drivers. It was also considered one of the finest tracks in the United States.

=== Entry list ===
- (R) denotes rookie driver.

#	Driver	Team	Make	Sponsor
1	Jim Bown	Bown Racing	Chevrolet	Rose Auto Wrecking
2	Ernie Irvan (R)	U.S. Racing	Chevrolet	Kroger
3	Dale Earnhardt	Richard Childress Racing	Chevrolet	GM Goodwrench Service
03	Howard Mark	Mark Racing	Chevrolet	Deland Truck Centers
4	Rick Wilson	Morgan–McClure Motorsports	Oldsmobile	Kodak
04	Hershel McGriff	McGriff Racing	Pontiac	U.S. Bank
5	Geoff Bodine	Hendrick Motorsports	Chevrolet	Levi Garrett
6	Mark Martin	Roush Racing	Ford	Stroh Light
7	Alan Kulwicki	AK Racing	Ford	Zerex
8	Bobby Hillin Jr.	Stavola Brothers Racing	Buick	Miller High Life
08	Rick McCray	McCray Racing	Pontiac	Far West Meat
9	Bill Elliott	Melling Racing	Ford	Coors Light
10	Ken Bouchard (R)	Whitcomb Racing	Ford	Whitcomb Racing
11	Terry Labonte	Junior Johnson & Associates	Chevrolet	Budweiser
12	Bobby Allison	Stavola Brothers Racing	Buick	Miller High Life
14	Butch Gilliland	Gilliland Racing	Buick	Anaheim Wheels & Brakes
15	Brett Bodine	Bud Moore Engineering	Ford	Crisco
16	Reno Fontana	Fontana Racing	Pontiac	The Hollywood Reporter
17	Darrell Waltrip	Hendrick Motorsports	Chevrolet	Tide
18	Rick Hendrick	Hendrick Motorsports	Chevrolet	Superflo
19	Chad Little	Stoke Racing	Ford	Coors Extra Gold
20	Scott Gaylord	Burney Racing	Oldsmobile	Oliver Manufacturing
21	Kyle Petty	Wood Brothers Racing	Ford	Citgo
22	St. James Davis	St. James Racing	Buick	St. James Racing
25	Ken Schrader	Hendrick Motorsports	Chevrolet	Folgers
26	Ricky Rudd	King Racing	Buick	Quaker State
27	Rusty Wallace	Blue Max Racing	Pontiac	Kodiak
28	Davey Allison	Ranier-Lundy Racing	Ford	Havoline
29	Dale Jarrett	Cale Yarborough Motorsports	Oldsmobile	Hardee's
30	Michael Waltrip	Bahari Racing	Pontiac	Country Time
31	Joe Ruttman	Bob Clark Motorsports	Oldsmobile	Slender You Figure Salons
32	Ruben Garcia	Stoke Racing	Chevrolet	Pick Your Part
33	Morgan Shepherd	Mach 1 Racing	Chevrolet	Skoal Bandit
41	Jack Sellers	Vincent Racing	Chevrolet	Coca-Cola
43	Richard Petty	Petty Enterprises	Pontiac	STP
44	Sterling Marlin	Hagan Racing	Oldsmobile	Piedmont Airlines
45	Billy Fulcher	Fulcher Racing	Oldsmobile	Fulcher Racing
46	Marta Leonard	Leonard Racing	Chevrolet	The Leonard Company
48	Tony Spanos	Hylton Motorsports	Buick	Hylton Motorsports
50	George Follmer	Midgley Racing	Pontiac	Midgley Racing
52	Jimmy Means	Jimmy Means Racing	Pontiac	Eureka
55	Phil Parsons	Jackson Bros. Motorsports	Oldsmobile	Crown, Skoal Classic
62	Terry Petris	Petris Racing	Chevrolet	Petris Custom Homes
63	Jocko Maggiacomo	Linro Motorsports	Chevrolet	Linro Motorsports
66	John Krebs	Krebs Racing	Oldsmobile	Skoal
67	Ron Esau	Arrington Racing	Buick	McDonald's
68	Derrike Cope	Testa Racing	Ford	Purolator Filters
71	Dave Marcis	Marcis Auto Racing	Chevrolet	Lifebuoy
73	Bill Schmitt	Schmitt Racing	Chevrolet	Schmitt Racing
74	Ray Kelly	Ray Kelly Racing	Pontiac	Ray Kelly Racing
75	Neil Bonnett	RahMoc Enterprises	Pontiac	Valvoline
76	Tommy Kendall	Spears Motorsports	Buick	Spears Manufacturing
79	Roy Smith	Razore Racing	Ford	Western Peterbilt
81	Glen Steurer	Steurer Racing	Chevrolet	Steurer Racing
82	J. C. Danielsen	Gautsche Racing	Buick	Chico Auto Parts
83	Lake Speed	Speed Racing	Oldsmobile	Wynn's, Kmart
85	Sumner McKnight	McKnight Racing	Ford	McKnight Racing
88	Buddy Baker	Baker-Schiff Racing	Oldsmobile	Red Baron Frozen Pizza
89	Bob Howard	Hathaway Racing	Oldsmobile	Pennzoil
90	Benny Parsons	Donlavey Racing	Ford	Bull's-Eye Barbecue Sauce
97	Rodney Combs	Winkle Motorsports	Buick	AC Spark Plug

== Qualifying ==
Qualifying was split into two rounds. The first round was held on Friday, June 10, at 4:30 PM EST. Each driver would have one lap to set a time. During the first round, the top 25 drivers in the round would be guaranteed a starting spot in the race. If a driver was not able to guarantee a spot in the first round, they had the option to scrub their time from the first round and try and run a faster lap time in a second round qualifying run, held on Saturday, June 11, at 12:30 PM EST. As with the first round, each driver would have one lap to set a time. For this specific race, positions 26-40 would be decided on time, and depending on who needed it, a select amount of positions were given to cars who had not otherwise qualified but were high enough in owner's points; which was two for entries in the NASCAR Winston Cup Series and two extra provisionals for the NASCAR Winston West Series.

Ricky Rudd, driving for King Racing, would win the pole, setting a time of 1:19.606 and an average speed of 118.484 miles per hour (190.682 km/h) in the first round.

18 drivers would fail to qualify.

=== Full qualifying results ===
Pos.	#	Driver	Team	Make	Time	Speed
1	26	Ricky Rudd	King Racing	Buick	1:19.606	118.484
2	27	Rusty Wallace	Blue Max Racing	Pontiac	1:19.671	118.387
3	11	Terry Labonte	Junior Johnson & Associates	Chevrolet	1:19.730	118.299
4	75	Neil Bonnett	RahMoc Enterprises	Pontiac	1:20.020	117.871
5	21	Kyle Petty	Wood Brothers Racing	Ford	1:20.377	117.347
6	3	Dale Earnhardt	Richard Childress Racing	Chevrolet	1:20.415	117.292
7	17	Darrell Waltrip	Hendrick Motorsports	Chevrolet	1:20.522	117.136
8	9	Bill Elliott	Melling Racing	Ford	1:20.577	117.056
9	71	Dave Marcis	Marcis Auto Racing	Chevrolet	1:20.700	116.877
10	44	Sterling Marlin	Hagan Racing	Oldsmobile	1:20.736	116.825
11	25	Ken Schrader	Hendrick Motorsports	Chevrolet	1:20.755	116.798
12	33	Morgan Shepherd	Mach 1 Racing	Chevrolet	1:20.760	116.790
13	18	Rick Hendrick	Hendrick Motorsports	Chevrolet	1:20.794	116.741
14	5	Geoff Bodine	Hendrick Motorsports	Chevrolet	1:20.875	116.624
15	6	Mark Martin	Roush Racing	Ford	1:20.932	116.572
16	19	Chad Little	Stoke Racing	Ford	1:21.053	116.373
17	15	Brett Bodine	Bud Moore Engineering	Ford	1:21.124	116.266
18	83	Lake Speed	Speed Racing	Oldsmobile	1:21.281	116.042
19	29	Dale Jarrett	Cale Yarborough Motorsports	Oldsmobile	1:21.306	116.006
20	7	Alan Kulwicki	AK Racing	Ford	1:21.489	115.746
21	55	Phil Parsons	Jackson Bros. Motorsports	Oldsmobile	1:21.538	115.676
22	8	Bobby Hillin Jr.	Stavola Brothers Racing	Buick	1:21.677	115.479
23	12	Bobby Allison	Stavola Brothers Racing	Buick	1:21.681	115.474
24	76	Tommy Kendall	Spears Motorsports	Buick	1:21.843	115.245
25	4	Rick Wilson	Morgan–McClure Motorsports	Oldsmobile	1:21.883	115.189
Failed to lock in Round 1
26	79	Roy Smith	Razore Racing	Ford	1:20.911	116.572
27	68	Derrike Cope	Testa Racing	Chevrolet	1:21.127	116.262
28	31	Joe Ruttman	Bob Clark Motorsports	Oldsmobile	1:21.309	116.001
29	43	Richard Petty	Petty Enterprises	Pontiac	1:21.343	115.953
30	90	Benny Parsons	Donlavey Racing	Ford	1:21.525	115.694
31	08	Rick McCray	McCray Racing	Pontiac	1:21.733	115.395
32	63	Jocko Maggiacomo	Linro Motorsports	Chevrolet	1:21.779	115.335
33	88	Buddy Baker	Baker–Schiff Racing	Oldsmobile	1:21.903	115.160
34	28	Davey Allison	Ranier-Lundy Racing	Ford	1:21.907	115.155
35	04	Hershel McGriff	McGriff Racing	Pontiac	1:22.234	114.697
36	62	Terry Petris	Petris Racing	Chevrolet	1:22.256	114.666
37	73	Bill Schmitt	Schmitt Racing	Chevrolet	1:22.267	114.651
38	66	John Krebs	Krebs Racing	Oldsmobile	1:22.312	114.588
39	1	Jim Bown	Bown Racing	Chevrolet	1:22.465	114.375
40	30	Michael Waltrip	Bahari Racing	Pontiac	1:22.538	114.274
Winston Cup provisionals
41	52	Jimmy Means	Jimmy Means Racing	Pontiac	-*	-*
42	2	Ernie Irvan (R)	U.S. Racing	Chevrolet	-*	-*
Winston West provisional
43	32	Ruben Garcia	Stoke Racing	Chevrolet	-*	-*
Failed to qualify (results unknown)
44	03	Howard Mark	Mark Racing	Chevrolet	-*	-*
45	10	Ken Bouchard (R)	Whitcomb Racing	Ford	-*	-*
46	14	Butch Gilliland	Gilliland Racing	Buick	-*	-*
47	16	Reno Fontana	Fontana Racing	Pontiac	-*	-*
48	20	Scott Gaylord	Burney Racing	Oldsmobile	-*	-*
49	22	St. James Davis	St. James Racing	Buick	-*	-*
50	41	Jack Sellers	Vincent Racing	Chevrolet	-*	-*
51	45	Billy Fulcher	Fulcher Racing	Oldsmobile	-*	-*
52	46	Marta Leonard	Leonard Racing	Chevrolet	-*	-*
53	48	Tony Spanos	Hylton Motorsports	Buick	-*	-*
54	50	George Follmer	Midgley Racing	Pontiac	-*	-*
55	67	Ron Esau	Arrington Racing	Buick	-*	-*
56	74	Ray Kelly	Ray Kelly Racing	Pontiac	-*	-*
57	81	Glen Steurer	Steurer Racing	Chevrolet	-*	-*
58	82	J. C. Danielsen	Gautsche Racing	Buick	-*	-*
59	85	Sumner McKnight	McKnight Racing	Ford	-*	-*
60	89	Bob Howard	Hathaway Racing	Oldsmobile	-*	-*
61	97	Rodney Combs	Winkle Motorsports	Buick	-*	-*
Official first round qualifying results
Official starting lineup

== Race results ==
Fin	St	#	Driver	Team	Make	Laps	Led	Status	Pts	Winnings
1	2	27	Rusty Wallace	Blue Max Racing	Pontiac	95	43	running	185	$49,100
2	3	11	Terry Labonte	Junior Johnson & Associates	Chevrolet	95	1	running	175	$26,175
3	1	26	Ricky Rudd	King Racing	Buick	95	30	running	170	$20,950
4	6	3	Dale Earnhardt	Richard Childress Racing	Chevrolet	95	7	running	165	$18,600
5	21	55	Phil Parsons	Jackson Bros. Motorsports	Oldsmobile	95	0	running	155	$10,725
6	29	43	Richard Petty	Petty Enterprises	Pontiac	95	0	running	150	$10,850
7	15	6	Mark Martin	Roush Racing	Ford	95	0	running	146	$5,450
8	19	29	Dale Jarrett	Cale Yarborough Motorsports	Oldsmobile	95	4	running	147	$5,000
9	10	44	Sterling Marlin	Hagan Racing	Oldsmobile	95	0	running	138	$6,675
10	4	75	Neil Bonnett	RahMoc Enterprises	Pontiac	95	5	running	139	$12,925
11	40	30	Michael Waltrip	Bahari Racing	Pontiac	95	0	running	130	$6,275
12	37	73	Bill Schmitt	Schmitt Racing	Chevrolet	95	0	running	127	$4,450
13	30	90	Benny Parsons	Donlavey Racing	Ford	95	0	running	124	$5,550
14	5	21	Kyle Petty	Wood Brothers Racing	Ford	95	0	running	121	$9,650
15	13	18	Rick Hendrick (Note: Hendrick was relieved by Elliott Forbes-Robinson six laps into the race. However, since Hendrick started the race, he is credited with the 15th place finish.)	Hendrick Motorsports	Chevrolet	94	0	running	118	$2,550
16	8	9	Bill Elliott	Melling Racing	Ford	94	0	running	115	$11,000
17	27	68	Derrike Cope	Testa Racing	Chevrolet	94	0	running	112	$5,075
18	24	76	Tommy Kendall	Spears Motorsports	Buick	94	1	running	114	$3,400
19	33	88	Buddy Baker	Baker–Schiff Racing	Oldsmobile	94	0	running	106	$4,800
20	11	25	Ken Schrader	Hendrick Motorsports	Chevrolet	94	0	running	103	$8,550
21	9	71	Dave Marcis	Marcis Auto Racing	Chevrolet	94	0	running	100	$4,600
22	23	12	Bobby Allison	Stavola Brothers Racing	Buick	93	0	running	97	$8,700
23	16	19	Chad Little	Stoke Racing	Ford	93	3	running	99	$3,875
24	22	8	Bobby Hillin Jr.	Stavola Brothers Racing	Buick	92	0	running	91	$4,250
25	38	66	John Krebs	Krebs Racing	Oldsmobile	92	0	running	88	$1,600
26	18	83	Lake Speed	Speed Racing	Oldsmobile	91	0	running	85	$2,125
27	26	79	Roy Smith	Razore Racing	Ford	85	1	running	87	$2,575
28	7	17	Darrell Waltrip	Hendrick Motorsports	Chevrolet	85	0	overheating	79	$8,400
29	28	31	Joe Ruttman	Bob Clark Motorsports	Oldsmobile	84	0	running	76	$2,000
30	32	63	Jocko Maggiacomo	Linro Motorsports	Chevrolet	84	0	running	73	$1,350
31	42	2	Ernie Irvan (R)	U.S. Racing	Chevrolet	78	0	oil pump	70	$1,050
32	34	28	Davey Allison	Ranier-Lundy Racing	Ford	74	0	running	67	$10,675
33	25	4	Rick Wilson	Morgan–McClure Motorsports	Oldsmobile	56	0	running	64	$1,850
34	14	5	Geoff Bodine	Hendrick Motorsports	Chevrolet	52	0	piston	61	$3,225
35	36	62	Terry Petris	Petris Racing	Chevrolet	52	0	ball joint	0	$1,150
36	35	04	Hershel McGriff	McGriff Racing	Pontiac	51	0	rock stud	55	$1,145
37	31	08	Rick McCray	McCray Racing	Pontiac	46	0	engine	52	$1,140
38	20	7	Alan Kulwicki	AK Racing	Ford	39	0	oil pressure	49	$3,135
39	43	32	Ruben Garcia	Stoke Racing	Chevrolet	27	0	accident	46	$3,380
40	17	15	Brett Bodine	Bud Moore Engineering	Ford	22	0	engine	43	$9,700
41	39	1	Jim Bown	Bown Racing	Chevrolet	22	0	oil pressure	40	$1,600
42	12	33	Morgan Shepherd	Mach 1 Racing	Chevrolet	10	0	engine	37	$3,100
43	41	52	Jimmy Means	Jimmy Means Racing	Pontiac	5	0	engine	34	$3,100
Failed to qualify
44		03	Howard Mark	Mark Racing	Chevrolet					
45		10	Ken Bouchard (R)	Whitcomb Racing	Ford					
46		14	Butch Gilliland	Gilliland Racing	Buick					
47		16	Reno Fontana	Fontana Racing	Pontiac					
48		20	Scott Gaylord	Burney Racing	Oldsmobile					
49		22	St. James Davis	St. James Racing	Buick					
50		41	Jack Sellers	Vincent Racing	Chevrolet					
51		45	Billy Fulcher	Fulcher Racing	Oldsmobile					
52		46	Marta Leonard	Leonard Racing	Chevrolet					
53		48	Tony Spanos	Hylton Motorsports	Buick					
54		50	George Follmer	Midgley Racing	Pontiac					
55		67	Ron Esau	Arrington Racing	Buick					
56		74	Ray Kelly	Ray Kelly Racing	Pontiac					
57		81	Glen Steurer	Steurer Racing	Chevrolet					
58		82	J. C. Danielsen	Gautsche Racing	Buick					
59		85	Sumner McKnight	McKnight Racing	Ford					
60		89	Bob Howard	Hathaway Racing	Oldsmobile					
61		97	Rodney Combs	Winkle Motorsports	Buick					
Official race results

== Standings after the race ==
Drivers' Championship standings

	Pos	Driver	Points
1	1	Rusty Wallace	1,790
1	2	Dale Earnhardt	1,786 (-4)
2	3	Terry Labonte	1,702 (-88)
1	4	Bill Elliott	1,686 (–104)
1	5	Sterling Marlin	1,677 (–113)
	6	Bobby Allison	1,608 (–182)
	7	Ken Schrader	1,531 (–259)
1	8	Bobby Hillin Jr.	1,478 (–312)
1	9	Geoff Bodine	1,474 (–316)
2	10	Phil Parsons	1,469 (–321)
Official driver's standings

- Note: Only the first 10 positions are included for the driver standings.

== Notes ==
Previous race: 1988 Budweiser 500	NASCAR Winston Cup Series; 1988 season	Next race: 1988 Miller High Life 500

Previous race: 1988 Kragen Auto Parts 200	NASCAR Winston West Series; 1988 season	Next race: 1988 Budweiser 300
