= Bob Kennedy (racing driver) =

American racing driver (born 1942)

- Born: May 13, 1942 (age 84); Thousand Oaks, California, U.S.

NASCAR Cup Series career
- 1 race run over 1 year
- Best finish: 84th (1983)
- First race: 1983 Budweiser 400 (Riverside)
Wins	Top tens	Poles
0	0	0

ARCA Menards Series West career
- 45 races run over 9 years
- Best finish: 10th (1983)
- First race: 1975 Monterey Triple Crown (Laguna Seca)
- Last race: 1989 Winston 200 (Sonoma)
Wins	Top tens	Poles
0	12	0
- Statistics up to date as of November 6, 2026.

Bob Kennedy (born May 13, 1942) is an American former professional stock car racing driver. He primarily competed in the NASCAR Winston West Series, where he raced between 1975 and 1989.

== Racing career ==
Kennedy attempted to make his NASCAR Winston West Series debut at Laguna Seca Raceway in 1973, failing to qualify.

Kennedy again attempted his Winston West Series debut at Altamont Speedway in 1974, failing to qualify. His second attempt of the season, a combination race at Riverside International Raceway, where he also failed to qualify, doubled as his first NASCAR Winston Cup Series attempt.

Kennedy made his Winston West Series debut at Laguna Seca Raceway in 1975, finishing thirteenth.

Kennedy's next Winston West appearances came in 1981, where he finished eighth at Riverside and thirteenth at Sears Point International Raceway.

In 1982, Kennedy attempted ten of thirteen races, where in nine starts he scored three top-tens with a best finish of eighth at Sears Point. He failed to qualify for a combination race at Riverside.

Kennedy ran nine of ten Winston West races in 1983, scoring two top-tens, both seventh place finishes, which came at Sears Point and Riverside. He finished a career-best tenth in the standings. Kennedy made his lone Winston Cup start in a combination race at Riverside, finishing nineteenth; he failed to qualify for the second combination race at the track.

Kennedy made eight Winston West starts in 1984, scoring one top-ten, finishing ninth at Sears Point. He failed to qualify for the second Riverside combination race.

Kennedy ran six Winston West races in 1985, finishing in the top-ten in the first four, scoring a best finish of sixth at Seattle International Raceway.

Kennedy made five starts in 1986, failing to finish in the top-ten with his best finish being fourteenth at the Tacoma Dome. He failed to qualify for his final Winston Cup attempt in a combination race at Riverside.

In 1987, Kennedy competed in four Winston West races, scoring a best finish of twelfth in the season opener at Sears Point, the only race he finished.

After not making any starts in 1988, Kennedy made his final Winston West start at Sears Point in 1989, where he finished eighth.
