= 1996 Save Mart Supermarkets 300 =

Tenth race of the 1997 NASCAR Winston Cup Series

Race details
- Race 10 of 31 in the 1996 NASCAR Winston Cup Series
- The 1996 Save Mart Supermarkets 300 program cover.
- Date: May 5, 1996
- Official name: 8th Annual Save Mart Supermarkets 300
- Location: Sonoma, California, Sears Point Raceway
- Course: Permanent racing facility
- Course length: 2.52 miles (4.06 km)
- Distance: 74 laps, 186.48 mi (300.11 km)
- Scheduled distance: 74 laps, 186.48 mi (300.11 km)
- Average speed: 77.673 miles per hour (125.003 km/h)
- Attendance: 102,000

Pole position
Driver	Terry Labonte	Hendrick Motorsports
- Time: 1:38.050

Most laps led
Driver	Rusty Wallace	Penske Racing South
- Laps: 36

Winner
No. 2	Rusty Wallace	Penske Racing South

Television in the United States
- Network: ESPN
- Announcers: Bob Jenkins, Ned Jarrett, Benny Parsons

Radio in the United States
- Radio: Motor Racing Network

The 1996 Save Mart Supermarkets 300 was the tenth stock car race of the 1996 NASCAR Winston Cup Series, the fourth race of the 1996 NASCAR Winston West Series, and the eighth iteration of the event. The race was held on Sunday, May 5, 1996, in Sonoma, California, at the Grand Prix layout of Sears Point Raceway, a 2.52 miles (4.06 km) permanent road course layout. The race took the scheduled 74 laps to complete. In the final laps of the race, Penske Racing South driver Rusty Wallace would manage to pull away on the final restart with six to go to take his 43rd career NASCAR Winston Cup Series victory and his second victory of the season. To fill out the top three, Roush Racing driver Mark Martin and Bud Moore Engineering driver Wally Dallenbach Jr. would finish second and third, respectively.

== Background ==
The layout of Sears Point Raceway used by NASCAR at the time.

Sears Point Raceway is one of two road courses to hold NASCAR races, the other being Watkins Glen International. The standard road course at Sears Point Raceway is a 12-turn course that is 2.52 miles (4.06 km) long; the track was modified in 1998, adding the Chute, which bypassed turns 5 and 6, shortening the course to 1.95 miles (3.14 km). The Chute was only used for NASCAR events such as this race, and was criticized by many drivers, who preferred the full layout. In 2001, it was replaced with a 70-degree turn, 4A, bringing the track to its current dimensions of 1.99 miles (3.20 km).

=== Entry list ===
- (R) denotes rookie driver.

#	Driver	Team	Make
00	Scott Gaylord	Oliver Racing	Chevrolet
1	Rick Mast	Precision Products Racing	Pontiac
2	Rusty Wallace	Penske Racing South	Ford
02	Bill McAnally	Bill McAnally Racing	Chevrolet
3	Dale Earnhardt	Richard Childress Racing	Chevrolet
03	Joe Bean	Bean Racing	Ford
4	Sterling Marlin	Morgan–McClure Motorsports	Chevrolet
5	Terry Labonte	Hendrick Motorsports	Chevrolet
6	Mark Martin	Roush Racing	Ford
7	Dave Rezendes	Geoff Bodine Racing	Ford
07	Geoff Bodine	Geoff Bodine Racing	Ford
07W	Lance Hooper	Golden West Motorsports	Pontiac
8	Hut Stricklin	Stavola Brothers Racing	Ford
9	Lake Speed	Melling Racing	Ford
10	Ricky Rudd	Rudd Performance Motorsports	Ford
11	Brett Bodine	Brett Bodine Racing	Ford
12	Derrike Cope	Bobby Allison Motorsports	Ford
14	Jeff Krogh	Excel Motorsports	Chevrolet
15	Wally Dallenbach Jr.	Bud Moore Engineering	Ford
16	Ted Musgrave	Roush Racing	Ford
17	Darrell Waltrip	Darrell Waltrip Motorsports	Chevrolet
18	Bobby Labonte	Joe Gibbs Racing	Chevrolet
19	Dick Trickle	TriStar Motorsports	Ford
20	Mark Krogh	Excel Motorsports	Chevrolet
21	Michael Waltrip	Wood Brothers Racing	Ford
22	Ward Burton	Bill Davis Racing	Pontiac
23	Jimmy Spencer	Haas-Carter Motorsports	Ford
24	Jeff Gordon	Hendrick Motorsports	Chevrolet
25	Ken Schrader	Hendrick Motorsports	Chevrolet
28	Ernie Irvan	Robert Yates Racing	Ford
29	Steve Grissom	Diamond Ridge Motorsports	Chevrolet
30	Johnny Benson Jr. (R)	Bahari Racing	Pontiac
33	Robert Pressley	Leo Jackson Motorsports	Chevrolet
35	Larry Gunselman	Race Stuff Motorsports	Ford
37	Jeremy Mayfield	Kranefuss-Haas Racing	Ford
38	Rich Woodland Jr.	Bill Stroppe Motorsports	Chevrolet
41	Ricky Craven	Larry Hedrick Motorsports	Chevrolet
42	Kyle Petty	Team SABCO	Pontiac
43	Bobby Hamilton	Petty Enterprises	Pontiac
45	Chad Little	JTC Racing	Chevrolet
58	Wayne Jacks	Jacks Motorsports	Pontiac
71	Dave Marcis	Marcis Auto Racing	Chevrolet
75	Morgan Shepherd	Butch Mock Motorsports	Ford
77	Bobby Hillin Jr.	Jasper Motorsports	Ford
81	Kenny Wallace	FILMAR Racing	Ford
87	Joe Nemechek	NEMCO Motorsports	Chevrolet
88	Dale Jarrett	Robert Yates Racing	Ford
90	Mike Wallace	Donlavey Racing	Ford
94	Tommy Kendall	Bill Elliott Racing	Ford
98	Jeremy Mayfield	Cale Yarborough Motorsports	Ford
99	Jeff Burton	Roush Racing	Ford

== Qualifying ==
Qualifying was split into two rounds. The first round was held on Friday, May 3, at 6:00 PM EST. Each driver would have one lap to set a time. During the first round, the top 25 drivers in the round would be guaranteed a starting spot in the race. If a driver was not able to guarantee a spot in the first round, they had the option to scrub their time from the first round and try and run a faster lap time in a second round qualifying run, held on Saturday, May 4, at 3:00 PM EST. As with the first round, each driver would have one lap to set a time. For this specific race, positions 26-38 would be decided on time, and four spots would be determined by NASCAR Winston Cup Series provisionals, while two more additional provisionals would be given to teams in the Winston West Series.

Terry Labonte, driving for Hendrick Motorsports, would win the pole, setting a time of 1:38.050 and an average speed of 92.524 miles per hour (148.903 km/h).

Seven drivers would fail to qualify: Geoff Bodine, Chad Little, Mark Krogh, Joe Bean, Wayne Jacks, Bill McAnally, and Lance Hooper.

=== Full qualifying results ===
Pos.	#	Driver	Team	Make	Time	Speed
1	5	Terry Labonte	Hendrick Motorsports	Chevrolet	1:38.050	92.524
2	10	Ricky Rudd	Rudd Performance Motorsports	Ford	1:38.407	92.189
3	41	Ron Hornaday Jr.	Larry Hedrick Motorsports	Chevrolet	1:38.436	92.161
4	6	Mark Martin	Roush Racing	Ford	1:38.461	92.138
5	3	Dale Earnhardt	Richard Childress Racing	Chevrolet	1:38.528	92.075
6	24	Jeff Gordon	Hendrick Motorsports	Chevrolet	1:38.671	91.942
7	2	Rusty Wallace	Penske Racing South	Ford	1:38.866	91.761
8	42	Kyle Petty	Team SABCO	Pontiac	1:38.877	91.750
9	87	Joe Nemechek	NEMCO Motorsports	Chevrolet	1:38.979	91.656
10	15	Wally Dallenbach Jr.	Bud Moore Engineering	Ford	1:39.009	91.628
11	16	Ted Musgrave	Roush Racing	Ford	1:39.093	91.550
12	25	Ken Schrader	Hendrick Motorsports	Chevrolet	1:39.155	91.493
13	11	Brett Bodine	Brett Bodine Racing	Ford	1:39.250	91.406
14	4	Sterling Marlin	Morgan–McClure Motorsports	Chevrolet	1:39.327	91.335
15	22	Ward Burton	Bill Davis Racing	Pontiac	1:39.357	91.307
16	21	Michael Waltrip	Wood Brothers Racing	Ford	1:39.362	91.303
17	12	Derrike Cope	Bobby Allison Motorsports	Ford	1:39.375	91.291
18	28	Ernie Irvan	Robert Yates Racing	Ford	1:39.387	91.280
19	43	Bobby Hamilton	Petty Enterprises	Pontiac	1:39.388	91.279
20	88	Dale Jarrett	Robert Yates Racing	Ford	1:39.534	91.145
21	18	Bobby Labonte	Joe Gibbs Racing	Pontiac	1:39.580	91.103
22	23	Jimmy Spencer	Travis Carter Enterprises	Ford	1:39.697	90.996
23	7	Dave Rezendes	Geoff Bodine Racing	Ford	1:39.782	90.918
24	75	Morgan Shepherd	Butch Mock Motorsports	Ford	1:39.868	90.840
25	37	John Andretti	Kranefuss-Haas Racing	Ford	1:39.924	90.789
Failed to lock in Round 1
26	9	Lake Speed	Melling Racing	Ford	1:39.624	91.062
27	17	Darrell Waltrip	Darrell Waltrip Motorsports	Chevrolet	1:39.663	91.027
28	14	Jeff Krogh	Excel Motorsports	Chevrolet	1:39.737	90.959
29	00	Scott Gaylord	Oliver Racing	Chevrolet	1:39.854	90.853
30	33	Robert Pressley	Leo Jackson Motorsports	Chevrolet	1:39.923	90.790
31	30	Johnny Benson Jr. (R)	Bahari Racing	Pontiac	1:40.000	90.718
32	94	Tommy Kendall	Bill Elliott Racing	Ford	1:40.001	90.713
33	81	Kenny Wallace	FILMAR Racing	Ford	1:40.223	90.516
34	77	Bobby Hillin Jr.	Jasper Motorsports	Ford	1:40.250	90.494
35	8	Hut Stricklin	Stavola Brothers Racing	Ford	1:40.432	90.330
36	19	Ken Petersen	TriStar Motorsports	Ford	1:40.437	90.325
37	98	Jeremy Mayfield	Cale Yarborough Motorsports	Ford	1:40.445	90.318
38	1	Rick Mast	Precision Products Racing	Pontiac	1:40.462	90.303
Winston Cup provisionals
39	99	Jeff Burton	Roush Racing	Ford	-*	-*
40	29	Steve Grissom	Diamond Ridge Motorsports	Chevrolet	-*	-*
41	71	Dave Marcis	Marcis Auto Racing	Chevrolet	-*	-*
42	90	Mike Wallace	Donlavey Racing	Ford	-*	-*
Winston West provisionals
43	35	Larry Gunselman	Race Stuff Motorsports	Ford	-*	-*
44	38	Rich Woodland Jr.	Bill Stroppe Motorsports	Chevrolet	-*	-*
Failed to qualify
45	07	Geoff Bodine	Geoff Bodine Racing	Ford	-*	-*
46	45	Chad Little	JTC Racing	Chevrolet	-*	-*
47	20	Mark Krogh	Excel Motorsports	Chevrolet	-*	-*
48	03	Joe Bean	Bean Racing	Ford	-*	-*
49	58	Wayne Jacks	Jacks Motorsports	Pontiac	-*	-*
50	02	Bill McAnally	Bill McAnally Racing	Chevrolet	-*	-*
51	07W	Lance Hooper	Golden West Motorsports	Pontiac	-*	-*
Official first round qualifying results
Official starting lineup

== Race results ==
Fin	St	#	Driver	Team	Make	Laps	Led	Status	Pts	Winnings
1	7	2	Rusty Wallace	Penske Racing South	Ford	74	36	running	185	$58,395
2	4	6	Mark Martin	Roush Racing	Ford	74	0	running	170	$58,640
3	10	15	Wally Dallenbach Jr.	Bud Moore Engineering	Ford	74	0	running	165	$50,850
4	5	3	Dale Earnhardt	Richard Childress Racing	Chevrolet	74	6	running	165	$39,160
5	1	5	Terry Labonte	Hendrick Motorsports	Chevrolet	74	13	running	160	$41,995
6	6	24	Jeff Gordon	Hendrick Motorsports	Chevrolet	74	12	running	155	$48,145
7	2	10	Ricky Rudd	Rudd Performance Motorsports	Ford	74	0	running	146	$31,195
8	12	25	Ken Schrader	Hendrick Motorsports	Chevrolet	74	0	running	142	$26,495
9	21	18	Bobby Labonte	Joe Gibbs Racing	Pontiac	74	0	running	138	$29,945
10	15	22	Ward Burton	Bill Davis Racing	Pontiac	74	0	running	134	$36,740
11	25	37	John Andretti	Kranefuss-Haas Racing	Ford	74	0	running	130	$24,430
12	20	88	Dale Jarrett	Robert Yates Racing	Ford	74	0	running	127	$20,530
13	35	8	Hut Stricklin	Stavola Brothers Racing	Ford	74	0	running	124	$19,230
14	27	17	Darrell Waltrip	Darrell Waltrip Motorsports	Chevrolet	74	0	running	121	$23,130
15	14	4	Sterling Marlin	Morgan–McClure Motorsports	Chevrolet	74	0	running	118	$29,130
16	26	9	Lake Speed	Melling Racing	Ford	74	0	running	115	$22,880
17	19	43	Bobby Hamilton	Petty Enterprises	Pontiac	74	0	running	112	$22,205
18	31	30	Johnny Benson Jr. (R)	Bahari Racing	Pontiac	74	0	running	109	$23,055
19	38	1	Rick Mast	Precision Products Racing	Pontiac	74	1	running	111	$21,830
20	13	11	Brett Bodine	Brett Bodine Racing	Ford	74	0	running	103	$23,505
21	22	23	Jimmy Spencer	Travis Carter Enterprises	Ford	74	0	running	100	$21,505
22	16	21	Michael Waltrip	Wood Brothers Racing	Ford	74	0	running	97	$21,355
23	11	16	Ted Musgrave	Roush Racing	Ford	74	0	running	94	$21,230
24	24	75	Morgan Shepherd	Butch Mock Motorsports	Ford	74	0	running	91	$14,060
25	40	29	Steve Grissom	Diamond Ridge Motorsports	Chevrolet	74	0	running	88	$21,150
26	39	99	Jeff Burton	Roush Racing	Ford	74	0	running	85	$10,730
27	33	81	Kenny Wallace	FILMAR Racing	Ford	74	0	running	82	$10,705
28	32	94	Tommy Kendall	Bill Elliott Racing	Ford	73	4	running	84	$20,730
29	36	19	Dick Trickle	TriStar Motorsports	Ford	73	0	running	76	$10,620
30	8	42	Kyle Petty	Team SABCO	Pontiac	73	0	running	73	$20,590
31	3	41	Ricky Craven	Larry Hedrick Motorsports	Chevrolet	73	0	running	70	$20,840
32	37	98	Jeremy Mayfield	Cale Yarborough Motorsports	Ford	73	0	running	67	$12,790
33	41	71	Dave Marcis	Marcis Auto Racing	Chevrolet	73	2	running	69	$10,255
34	30	33	Robert Pressley	Leo Jackson Motorsports	Chevrolet	72	0	running	61	$17,240
35	28	14	Jeff Krogh	Excel Motorsports	Chevrolet	71	0	running	58	$10,215
36	43	35	Larry Gunselman	Race Stuff Motorsports	Ford	70	0	running	55	$10,200
37	44	38	Rich Woodland Jr.	Bill Stroppe Motorsports	Chevrolet	68	0	running	52	$10,095
38	29	00	Scott Gaylord	Oliver Racing	Chevrolet	67	0	running	49	$10,095
39	17	12	Derrike Cope	Bobby Allison Motorsports	Ford	65	0	accident	46	$17,095
40	23	7	Geoff Bodine	Geoff Bodine Racing	Ford	65	0	running	43	$17,095
41	9	87	Joe Nemechek	NEMCO Motorsports	Chevrolet	64	0	running	40	$17,095
42	18	28	Ernie Irvan	Robert Yates Racing	Ford	61	0	running	37	$26,095
43	34	77	Bobby Hillin Jr.	Jasper Motorsports	Ford	55	0	running	34	$10,095
44	42	90	Mike Wallace	Donlavey Racing	Ford	52	0	rear end	31	$10,095
Official race results

Previous race: 1996 Winston Select 500	NASCAR Winston Cup Series; 1996 season	Next race: 1996 Coca-Cola 600
