= 1995 Dura Lube 500 =

30th race of the 1995 NASCAR Winston Cup Series

Race details
- Race 30 of 31 in the 1995 NASCAR Winston Cup Series
- The 1995 Dura Lube 500 program cover.
- Date: October 29, 1995
- Official name: 8th Annual Dura Lube 500
- Location: Avondale, Arizona, Phoenix International Raceway
- Course: Permanent racing facility
- Course length: 1 miles (1.6 km)
- Distance: 312 laps, 312 mi (502.115 km)
- Scheduled distance: 312 laps, 312 mi (502.115 km)
- Average speed: 102.128 miles per hour (164.359 km/h)

Pole position
Driver	Bill Elliott	Elliott-Hardy Racing
- Time: 27.688

Most laps led
Driver	Ernie Irvan	Robert Yates Racing
- Laps: 111

Winner
No. 10	Ricky Rudd	Rudd Performance Motorsports

Television in the United States
- Network: TNN
- Announcers: Mike Joy, Buddy Baker, Dick Berggren

Radio in the United States
- Radio: Motor Racing Network

The 1995 Dura Lube 500 was the 30th and penultimate stock car race of the 1995 NASCAR Winston Cup Series, the 15th and final race of the 1995 NASCAR Winston West Series, and the eighth iteration of the event. The race was held on Sunday, October 29, 1995, in Avondale, Arizona at Phoenix International Raceway, a 1-mile (1.6 km) permanent low-banked tri-oval race track. The race took the scheduled 312 laps to complete. On the final restart with six to go, Ricky Rudd, driving for his own Rudd Performance Motorsports team, would manage to defend the field to take his 16th career NASCAR Winston Cup Series season, his only victory of the season, and with the win, maintaining a streak of 13 straight seasons with a victory. To fill out the top three, Bobby Allison Motorsports driver Derrike Cope and Richard Childress Racing driver Dale Earnhardt would finish second and third, respectively.

Heading into the final race of the season, the 1995 NAPA 500 at Atlanta Motor Speedway, Hendrick Motorsports driver Jeff Gordon was the heavy favorite to win the championship, only needing a finish of 41st or better to clinch his first NASCAR Winston Cup Series championship. The second-place driver, Richard Childress Racing driver Dale Earnhardt, was 147 points behind Gordon.

== Background ==
The layout of Phoenix International Raceway, the venue where the race was held.

Phoenix International Raceway – also known as PIR – is a one-mile, low-banked tri-oval race track located in Avondale, Arizona. It is named after the nearby metropolitan area of Phoenix. The motorsport track opened in 1964 and currently hosts two NASCAR race weekends annually. PIR has also hosted the IndyCar Series, CART, USAC and the Rolex Sports Car Series. The raceway is currently owned and operated by International Speedway Corporation.

The raceway was originally constructed with a 2.5 mi (4.0 km) road course that ran both inside and outside of the main tri-oval. In 1991 the track was reconfigured with the current 1.51 mi (2.43 km) interior layout. PIR has an estimated grandstand seating capacity of around 67,000. Lights were installed around the track in 2004 following the addition of a second annual NASCAR race weekend.

=== Entry list ===
- (R) denotes rookie driver.

#	Driver	Team	Make
00W	Scott Gaylord	Oliver Racing	Ford
1	Rick Mast	Precision Products Racing	Pontiac
2	Rusty Wallace	Penske Racing South	Ford
3	Dale Earnhardt	Richard Childress Racing	Chevrolet
4	Sterling Marlin	Morgan–McClure Motorsports	Chevrolet
5	Terry Labonte	Hendrick Motorsports	Chevrolet
6	Mark Martin	Roush Racing	Ford
7	Geoff Bodine	Geoff Bodine Racing	Ford
7W	L. J. Pryor	Red Eagle Racing	Chevrolet
07	Doug George	Olson Technology Racing	Ford
8	Jeff Burton	Stavola Brothers Racing	Ford
08	Mike Bliss	Ultra Motorsports	Ford
9	Lake Speed	Melling Racing	Ford
10	Ricky Rudd	Rudd Performance Motorsports	Ford
11	Brett Bodine	Junior Johnson & Associates	Ford
12	Derrike Cope	Bobby Allison Motorsports	Ford
15	Dick Trickle	Bud Moore Engineering	Ford
16	Ted Musgrave	Roush Racing	Ford
17	Darrell Waltrip	Darrell Waltrip Motorsports	Chevrolet
18	Bobby Labonte	Joe Gibbs Racing	Chevrolet
19	Ernie Cope	Lew Miller Racing	Chevrolet
21	Morgan Shepherd	Wood Brothers Racing	Ford
22	Ward Burton	Bill Davis Racing	Pontiac
23	Jimmy Spencer	Haas-Carter Motorsports	Ford
24	Jeff Gordon	Hendrick Motorsports	Chevrolet
25	Ken Schrader	Hendrick Motorsports	Chevrolet
26	Hut Stricklin	King Racing	Ford
27	Elton Sawyer	Junior Johnson & Associates	Ford
28	Dale Jarrett	Robert Yates Racing	Ford
29	Steve Grissom	Diamond Ridge Motorsports	Chevrolet
30	Michael Waltrip	Bahari Racing	Pontiac
32	Greg Sacks	Active Motorsports	Chevrolet
33	Robert Pressley (R)	Leo Jackson Motorsports	Chevrolet
36W	Rich Woodland Jr.	Gilliland Racing	Chevrolet
37	John Andretti	Kranefuss-Haas Racing	Ford
40	Shane Hall	Dick Brooks Racing	Pontiac
41	Ricky Craven (R)	Larry Hedrick Motorsports	Chevrolet
42	Kyle Petty	Team SABCO	Pontiac
43	Bobby Hamilton	Petty Enterprises	Pontiac
45	Ron Hornaday Jr.	JTC Racing	Chevrolet
50	A. J. Foyt	A. J. Foyt Racing	Ford
58W	Wayne Jacks	Jacks Motorsports	Pontiac
71	Dave Marcis	Marcis Auto Racing	Chevrolet
75	Todd Bodine	Butch Mock Motorsports	Ford
77	Bobby Hillin Jr.	Jasper Motorsports	Ford
81	Kenny Wallace	FILMAR Racing	Ford
87	Joe Nemechek	NEMCO Motorsports	Chevrolet
88	Ernie Irvan	Robert Yates Racing	Ford
90	Mike Wallace	Donlavey Racing	Ford
94	Bill Elliott	Elliott-Hardy Racing	Ford
97	Chad Little	Mark Rypien Motorsports	Ford
98	Jeremy Mayfield	Cale Yarborough Motorsports	Ford

== Qualifying ==
Qualifying was split into two rounds. The first round was held on Friday, October 27, at 4:00 PM EST. Each driver would have one lap to set a time. During the first round, the top 25 drivers in the round would be guaranteed a starting spot in the race. If a driver was not able to guarantee a spot in the first round, they had the option to scrub their time from the first round and try and run a faster lap time in a second round qualifying run, held on Saturday, October 28, at 3:00 PM EST. As with the first round, each driver would have one lap to set a time. For this specific race, positions 26-38 would be decided on time, and four spots would be determined by NASCAR Winston Cup Series provisionals, while two more additional provisionals would be given to teams in the Winston West Series.

Bill Elliott, driving for Elliott-Hardy Racing, would win the pole, setting a time of 27.688 and an average speed of 130.020 miles per hour (209.247 km/h) in the first round.

Eight drivers would fail to qualify.

=== Full qualifying results ===
Pos.	#	Driver	Team	Make	Time	Speed
1	94	Bill Elliott	Elliott-Hardy Racing	Ford	27.688	130.020
2	3	Dale Earnhardt	Richard Childress Racing	Chevrolet	27.700	129.964
3	24	Jeff Gordon	Hendrick Motorsports	Chevrolet	27.738	129.786
4	1	Rick Mast	Precision Products Racing	Ford	27.741	129.772
5	6	Mark Martin	Roush Racing	Ford	27.779	129.594
6	2	Rusty Wallace	Penske Racing South	Ford	27.795	129.520
7	11	Brett Bodine	Junior Johnson & Associates	Ford	27.806	129.468
8	43	Bobby Hamilton	Petty Enterprises	Pontiac	27.865	129.190
9	21	Morgan Shepherd	Wood Brothers Racing	Ford	27.889	129.083
10	42	Kyle Petty	Team SABCO	Pontiac	27.891	129.074
11	33	Robert Pressley (R)	Leo Jackson Motorsports	Chevrolet	27.930	128.894
12	16	Ted Musgrave	Roush Racing	Ford	27.968	128.719
13	37	John Andretti	Kranefuss-Haas Racing	Ford	27.971	128.705
14	88	Ernie Irvan	Robert Yates Racing	Ford	27.983	128.650
15	25	Ken Schrader	Hendrick Motorsports	Chevrolet	27.984	128.645
16	5	Terry Labonte	Hendrick Motorsports	Chevrolet	27.994	128.599
17	98	Jeremy Mayfield	Cale Yarborough Motorsports	Ford	27.994	128.599
18	12	Derrike Cope	Bobby Allison Motorsports	Ford	27.999	128.576
19	26	Hut Stricklin	King Racing	Ford	28.005	128.548
20	4	Sterling Marlin	Morgan–McClure Motorsports	Chevrolet	28.012	128.516
21	17	Darrell Waltrip	Darrell Waltrip Motorsports	Chevrolet	28.017	128.493
22	32	Greg Sacks	Active Motorsports	Chevrolet	28.027	128.448
23	18	Bobby Labonte	Joe Gibbs Racing	Chevrolet	28.056	128.315
24	27	Elton Sawyer	Junior Johnson & Associates	Ford	28.058	128.306
25	8	Jeff Burton	Stavola Brothers Racing	Ford	28.064	128.278
Failed to lock in Round 1
26	28	Dale Jarrett	Robert Yates Racing	Ford	28.067	128.265
27	81	Kenny Wallace	FILMAR Racing	Ford	28.073	128.237
28	23	Jimmy Spencer	Travis Carter Enterprises	Ford	28.092	128.150
29	10	Ricky Rudd	Rudd Performance Motorsports	Ford	28.097	128.128
30	71	Dave Marcis	Marcis Auto Racing	Chevrolet	28.097	128.128
31	9	Lake Speed	Melling Racing	Ford	28.099	128.118
32	15	Dick Trickle	Bud Moore Engineering	Ford	28.102	128.105
33	29	Steve Grissom	Diamond Ridge Motorsports	Chevrolet	28.182	127.741
34	22	Ward Burton	Bill Davis Racing	Pontiac	28.193	127.691
35	87	Joe Nemechek	NEMCO Motorsports	Chevrolet	28.264	127.371
36	45	Ron Hornaday Jr.	JTC Racing	Chevrolet	28.337	127.042
37	30	Michael Waltrip	Bahari Racing	Pontiac	28.344	127.011
38	77	Bobby Hillin Jr.	Jasper Motorsports	Ford	28.360	126.939
Winston Cup provisionals
39	7	Geoff Bodine	Geoff Bodine Racing	Ford	-*	-*
40	41	Ricky Craven (R)	Larry Hedrick Motorsports	Chevrolet	-*	-*
41	75	Todd Bodine	Butch Mock Motorsports	Ford	-*	-*
42	90	Mike Wallace	Donlavey Racing	Ford	-*	-*
Winston West provisionals
43	07	Doug George	Olson Technology Racing	Ford	-*	-*
44	19	Ernie Cope	Lew Miller Racing	Chevrolet	-*	-*
Failed to qualify
45	50	A. J. Foyt	A. J. Foyt Racing	Ford	-*	-*
46	97	Chad Little	Mark Rypien Motorsports	Ford	-*	-*
47	08	Mike Bliss	Ultra Motorsports	Ford	-*	-*
48	40	Shane Hall	Dick Brooks Racing	Pontiac	-*	-*
49	00W	Scott Gaylord	Oliver Racing	Ford	-*	-*
50	58W	Wayne Jacks	Jacks Motorsports	Pontiac	-*	-*
51	7W	L. J. Pryor	Red Eagle Racing	Chevrolet	-*	-*
52	36W	Rich Woodland Jr.	Gilliland Racing	Chevrolet	-*	-*
Official first round qualifying results
Official starting lineup

== Race results ==
Fin	St	#	Driver	Team	Make	Laps	Led	Status	Pts	Winnings
1	29	10	Ricky Rudd	Rudd Performance Motorsports	Ford	312	63	running	180	$78,260
2	18	12	Derrike Cope	Bobby Allison Motorsports	Ford	312	34	running	175	$52,205
3	2	3	Dale Earnhardt	Richard Childress Racing	Chevrolet	312	71	running	170	$49,105
4	6	2	Rusty Wallace	Penske Racing South	Ford	312	22	running	165	$36,118
5	3	24	Jeff Gordon	Hendrick Motorsports	Chevrolet	312	0	running	155	$33,580
6	12	16	Ted Musgrave	Roush Racing	Ford	312	0	running	150	$25,420
7	9	21	Morgan Shepherd	Wood Brothers Racing	Ford	312	0	running	146	$23,670
8	5	6	Mark Martin	Roush Racing	Ford	312	0	running	142	$28,670
9	4	1	Rick Mast	Precision Products Racing	Ford	312	0	running	138	$22,270
10	15	25	Ken Schrader	Hendrick Motorsports	Chevrolet	312	0	running	134	$24,270
11	26	28	Dale Jarrett	Robert Yates Racing	Ford	312	0	running	130	$26,070
12	20	4	Sterling Marlin	Morgan–McClure Motorsports	Chevrolet	312	0	running	127	$24,170
13	16	5	Terry Labonte	Hendrick Motorsports	Chevrolet	312	0	running	124	$25,670
14	1	94	Bill Elliott	Elliott-Hardy Racing	Ford	312	9	running	126	$19,870
15	13	37	John Andretti	Kranefuss-Haas Racing	Ford	312	0	running	118	$15,370
16	39	7	Geoff Bodine	Geoff Bodine Racing	Ford	312	0	running	115	$24,570
17	7	11	Brett Bodine	Junior Johnson & Associates	Ford	312	0	running	112	$22,870
18	35	87	Joe Nemechek	NEMCO Motorsports	Chevrolet	311	0	running	109	$13,745
19	11	33	Robert Pressley (R)	Leo Jackson Motorsports	Chevrolet	311	0	running	106	$19,445
20	17	98	Jeremy Mayfield	Cale Yarborough Motorsports	Ford	311	0	running	103	$11,110
21	38	77	Bobby Hillin Jr.	Jasper Motorsports	Ford	311	0	running	100	$9,335
22	31	9	Lake Speed	Melling Racing	Ford	311	0	running	97	$13,010
23	25	8	Jeff Burton	Stavola Brothers Racing	Ford	311	0	running	94	$17,885
24	40	41	Ricky Craven (R)	Larry Hedrick Motorsports	Chevrolet	311	1	running	96	$13,235
25	41	75	Todd Bodine	Butch Mock Motorsports	Ford	311	0	running	88	$17,810
26	27	81	Kenny Wallace	FILMAR Racing	Ford	309	0	running	85	$9,185
27	36	45	Ron Hornaday Jr.	JTC Racing	Chevrolet	307	0	running	82	$9,660
28	30	71	Dave Marcis	Marcis Auto Racing	Chevrolet	306	0	running	79	$12,435
29	32	15	Dick Trickle	Bud Moore Engineering	Ford	304	0	running	76	$17,310
30	24	27	Elton Sawyer	Junior Johnson & Associates	Ford	298	0	crash	73	$17,085
31	8	43	Bobby Hamilton	Petty Enterprises	Pontiac	293	0	running	70	$12,160
32	33	29	Steve Grissom	Diamond Ridge Motorsports	Chevrolet	289	0	running	67	$11,785
33	28	23	Jimmy Spencer	Travis Carter Enterprises	Ford	288	0	running	64	$11,760
34	37	30	Michael Waltrip	Bahari Racing	Pontiac	277	0	running	61	$16,235
35	19	26	Hut Stricklin	King Racing	Ford	243	0	spoiler	58	$13,710
36	42	90	Mike Wallace	Donlavey Racing	Ford	240	1	engine	60	$8,685
37	23	18	Bobby Labonte	Joe Gibbs Racing	Chevrolet	235	0	running	52	$21,665
38	21	17	Darrell Waltrip	Darrell Waltrip Motorsports	Chevrolet	231	0	oil belt	49	$13,605
39	10	42	Kyle Petty	Team SABCO	Pontiac	230	0	crash	46	$14,605
40	14	88	Ernie Irvan	Robert Yates Racing	Ford	197	111	engine	53	$20,605
41	43	07	Doug George	Olson Technology Racing	Ford	178	0	crash	40	$8,605
42	34	22	Ward Burton	Bill Davis Racing	Pontiac	116	0	engine	37	$13,605
43	22	32	Greg Sacks	Active Motorsports	Chevrolet	38	0	brakes	34	$8,605
44	44	19	Ernie Cope	Lew Miller Racing	Chevrolet	19	0	engine	31	$8,605
Official race results

Previous race: 1995 AC Delco 400	NASCAR Winston Cup Series; 1995 season	Next race: 1995 NAPA 500

Previous race: 1995 Spears Manufacturing 300	NASCAR Winston West Series; 1995 season	Next race: 1996 NASCAR Winston West Series 150
