= Ruben Garcia (racing driver) =

American racing driver (born 1946)

- Born: April 1, 1946 (age 80); South El Monte, California, U.S.

NASCAR Cup Series career
- 9 races run over 5 years
- Best finish: 56th (1985)
- First race: 1984 Budweiser 400 (Riverside)
- Last race: 1988 Budweiser 400 (Riverside)
Wins	Top tens	Poles
0	0	0

ARCA Menards Series West career
- 44 races run over 6 years
- Best finish: 3rd (1985)
- First race: 1979 Winston Mesa Marin 100 (Mesa Marin)
- Last race: 1988 Budweiser 400 (Riverside)
- First win: 1985 Suncrest Motorhomes 200 (Mesa Marin)
- Last win: 1985 Timec 200 (Mesa Marin)
Wins	Top tens	Poles
2	23	1
- Statistics up to date as of February 18, 2025.

Ruben Garcia (born April 1, 1946) is an American NASCAR racer from South El Monte, California. He started out in the Winston West Series. He is best remembered for hitting the wall at the Riverside International Raceway on June 12, 1988, when he came off turn 9 and hit the wall near the grandstands. He wasn't injured, but did not race in the Winston West Series again.

Garcia competed in the first NASCAR race held outside North America, the 1988 Goodyear NASCAR 500 at the Calder Park Thunderdome in Australia, finishing twelfth.

Garcia is from Mexican ancestry, since his mother was Mexican.

Garcia is not related to Rubén García Jr.
