= Jim Robinson (racing driver) =

American racing driver (1946–1995)

- Born: James Richard Robinson; January 28, 1946; Clovis, New Mexico, U.S.
- Died: December 28, 1995 (aged 49); Sun Valley, Los Angeles, California, U.S.
- Cause of death: Pneumonia
- Achievements: 1983, 1984, 1985 NASCAR Winston West Series Champion
- Awards: West Coast Stock Car Hall of Fame (2002 - Inaugural Class)

NASCAR Cup Series career
- 21 races run over 9 years
- Best finish: 50th (1981)
- First race: 1971 Winston Western 500 (Riverside)
- Last race: 1987 Winston Western 500 (Riverside)
Wins	Top tens	Poles
0	2	0

James Richard Robinson (January 28, 1946 – December 28, 1995) was an American NASCAR driver from 1979 to 1987.

== Career ==
A resident of Reseda in California, Robinson began competing with the NASCAR Winston West Series in 1978. He soon began to enjoy success with the series winning the NASCAR Winston West Series Championship in 1983, 1984, and 1985 - finishing no worse than fifth in the series standings for eight years in a row. Robinson recorded thirteen NASCAR Winston West Series wins and won most popular driver many times.

Robinson made his NASCAR Winston Cup Series debut on January 14, 1979, at the year's season opener, the Winston Western 500 at Riverside International Raceway's 2.62-mile road course at Riverside, California, driving John Borneman's No. 81 Borneman Plastering Chevrolet. Robinson completed seventeen laps of the 119-lap event before suffering an engine failure. Robinson returned to Winston Cup Series competition driving A.J. Kurten's No. 78 San-Val Lumber Supply Chevrolet in the NAPA Riverside 400 and in the Los Angeles Times 500 at the 2.5-mile Ontario Motor Speedway at Ontario, California.

Robinson entered the same three events in 1980 driving Kurten's No. 78 San Fernando Valley Lumber Chevrolet finishing twentieth in the Warner W. Hodgdon 400 at Riverside. In 1981, he drove Jack Williams No. 78 San Fernando Valley Lumber/Hammer Security Chevrolet in the season opening Winston Western 500 at Riverside finishing sixth. He finished tenth when the series returned to Riverside for the Warner W. Hodgdon 400 driving the No. 78 Oldsmobile. The series returned to Riverside for a third visit for the Winston Western 500 in November where Robinson was swept up in a crash on the 53rd lap.

Robinson again competed in the NASCAR Winston Cup Series in 1982 in two events at Riverside, the Budweiser 400 and the Winston Western 500 recording a twentieth place finish. When the NASCAR Winston Cup Series visited Riverside in 1983, Robinson was on hand in the No. 78 Hammer Security Systems Oldsmobile. He finished eleventh in the Budweiser 400 and 21st in the Winston Western 500.

In 1984, Robinson once again competed in both Riverside events on the NASCAR Winston Cup Series schedule, the Budweiser 400 where he finished 14th in the No. 78 Gibson Oldsmobile and the Winston Western 500 where he finished 29th.

In 1985, Robinson finished thirteenth in the Budweiser 400 and twelfth in the Winston Western 500 at Riverside. He finished fifteenth in the 1986 Budweiser 400 at Riverside and 25th after an engine failure on lap 100 of the Winston Western 500.

Robinson's final year of NASCAR Winston Cup Series competition came in 1987. He finished 36th in the Budweiser 400 and 12th in the Winston Western 500 at Riverside.

Robinson was inducted into the NASCAR West Coast Stock Car Hall of Fame in 2002.

Robinson's grandsons Lucas McNeil and Jacob McNeil both race weekly at Irwindale Speedway in Irwindale, California where they are both multiple time winners and champions at the track. Lucas runs the No. 78 with the same design his grandfather did in tribute.

== Death ==
Robinson was badly injured during the Late Model portion of the 1988 Copper World Classic at Phoenix International Raceway when he spun and his helmet made contact with the outside retaining wall. Never recovering from head injuries, he remained hospitalised after the accident, until his death on December 28, 1995, as a result of complications from pneumonia.

Achievements
Preceded by Roy Smith	NASCAR Winston West Series champion 1983-1985	Succeeded by Hershel McGriff
