= 1986 First Union 400 =

Seventh race of the 1986 NASCAR Winston Cup Series

Race details
- Race 7 of 29 in the 1986 NASCAR Winston Cup Series
- The 1986 First Union 400 program cover, featuring Neil Bonnett.
- Date: April 20, 1986
- Official name: 36th Annual First Union 400
- Location: North Wilkesboro Speedway, North Wilkesboro, North Carolina
- Course: Permanent racing facility
- Course length: 0.625 miles (1.006 km)
- Distance: 400 laps, 250 mi (402.336 km)
- Scheduled distance: 400 laps, 250 mi (402.336 km)
- Average speed: 88.408 miles per hour (142.279 km/h)
- Attendance: 29,500

Pole position
Driver	Geoff Bodine	Hendrick Motorsports
- Time: 20.014

Most laps led
Driver	Dale Earnhardt	Richard Childress Racing
- Laps: 195

Winner
No. 3	Dale Earnhardt	Richard Childress Racing

Television in the United States
- Network: ESPN
- Announcers: Bob Jenkins, Larry Nuber, Benny Parsons

Radio in the United States
- Radio: Motor Racing Network

The 1986 First Union 400 was the seventh stock car race of the 1986 NASCAR Winston Cup Series and the 36th iteration of the event. The race was held on Sunday, April 20, 1986, before an audience of 29,500 in North Wilkesboro, North Carolina at the North Wilkesboro Speedway, a 0.625 miles (1.006 km) oval short track. The race took the scheduled 400 laps to complete.

By race's end, Richard Childress Racing's Dale Earnhardt was able to hold off a late-race charge by Bud Moore Engineering's Ricky Rudd, securing his 17th career NASCAR Winston Cup Series victory and his second victory of the season. To fill out the top three, Hendrick Motorsports' Geoff Bodine finished third.

The race was the first start for African-American driver Willy T. Ribbs, after previous failed attempts in the 1986 season. With the start, Ribbs became the sixth African-American driver to make a start in the NASCAR Winston Cup Series and the first African-American driver since George Wiltshire in 1975.

== Background ==
The layout of North Wilkesboro Speedway, the venue where the race was held

North Wilkesboro Speedway is a short oval racetrack located on U.S. Route 421, about five miles east of the town of North Wilkesboro, North Carolina, or 80 miles north of Charlotte. It measures 0.625 mi (1.006 km) and features a unique uphill backstretch and downhill frontstretch. It has previously held races in NASCAR's top three series, including 93 Winston Cup Series races. The track, a NASCAR original, operated from 1949, NASCAR's inception, until the track's original closure in 1996. The speedway briefly reopened in 2010 and hosted several stock car series races before closing again in the spring of 2011. It was re-opened in August 2022 for grassroots racing.

=== Entry list ===
- (R) denotes rookie driver.

#	Driver	Team	Make	Sponsor
01	Earle Canavan	Canavan Racing	Pontiac	Gates Hydraulics
3	Dale Earnhardt	Richard Childress Racing	Chevrolet	Wrangler
5	Geoff Bodine	Hendrick Motorsports	Chevrolet	Levi Garrett
6	Trevor Boys	U.S. Racing	Chevrolet	Finky's
7	Kyle Petty	Wood Brothers Racing	Ford	7-Eleven
8	Bobby Hillin Jr.	Stavola Brothers Racing	Chevrolet	Miller American
9	Bill Elliott	Melling Racing	Ford	Coors
11	Darrell Waltrip	Junior Johnson & Associates	Chevrolet	Budweiser
12	Neil Bonnett	Junior Johnson & Associates	Chevrolet	Budweiser
15	Ricky Rudd	Bud Moore Engineering	Ford	Motorcraft Quality Parts
17	Doug Heveron	Hamby Racing	Chevrolet	Hesco Exhaust Systems
22	Bobby Allison	Stavola Brothers Racing	Buick	Miller American
23	Michael Waltrip (R)	Bahari Racing	Pontiac	Hawaiian Punch
25	Tim Richmond	Hendrick Motorsports	Chevrolet	Folgers
26	Joe Ruttman	King Racing	Buick	Quaker State
27	Rusty Wallace	Blue Max Racing	Pontiac	Alugard
30	Willy T. Ribbs	DiGard Motorsports	Pontiac	Red Roof Inn
33	Harry Gant	Mach 1 Racing	Chevrolet	Skoal Bandit
35	Alan Kulwicki (R)	AK Racing	Ford	Quincy's Steakhouse
43	Richard Petty	Petty Enterprises	Pontiac	STP
44	Terry Labonte	Hagan Enterprises	Oldsmobile	Piedmont Airlines
48	Morgan Shepherd	Hylton Motorsports	Chevrolet	Hemmelgarn & Sons
52	Jimmy Means	Jimmy Means Racing	Pontiac	Jimmy Means Racing
64	Rick Baldwin	Langley Racing	Ford	Sunny King Ford
67	Buddy Arrington	Arrington Racing	Ford	Pannill Sweatshirts
70	J. D. McDuffie	McDuffie Racing	Pontiac	Rumple Furniture
71	Dave Marcis	Marcis Auto Racing	Pontiac	Helen Rae Special
75	Jody Ridley	RahMoc Enterprises	Ford	Nationwise Automotive
81	Chet Fillip (R)	Fillip Racing	Ford	Circle Bar Truck Corral
85	Bobby Gerhart	Bobby Gerhart Racing	Chevrolet	Bobby Gerhart Racing
90	Ken Schrader	Donlavey Racing	Ford	Red Baron Frozen Pizza
94	Eddie Bierschwale	Eller Racing	Pontiac	Kodak Film
96	Jerry Bowman	Jerry Bowman Racing	Ford	Jerry Bowman Racing
98	Ron Bouchard	Curb Racing	Pontiac	Valvoline

== Qualifying ==
Qualifying was done over two rounds of qualifying over two days. The first round was held on Friday, April 18, at 3:00 p.m. EST, with each driver having one lap to set a time. In the first round, the first eight drivers in the round were guaranteed a starting spot within the top eight; however, their official starting positions were then determined by calculating the averages of their first round time and their second round time, with the second round being held on Saturday, April 19, at 3:00 p.m. EST, with all drivers having one lap to set a time in the round. Drivers who did not lock into the race in the first round had the option to scrub their time from the first round and try and run a faster lap time, with all non-locked in drivers setting positions 9-30 based on speed. Depending on if teams needed it, a select amount of positions were given to cars who had not otherwise qualified but were high enough in owner's points; up to two were given.

Geoff Bodine, driving for Hendrick Motorsports, won the pole, setting an average time of 20.014 and average speed of 112.419 miles per hour (180.921 km/h) in his two runs.

Four drivers failed to qualify.

=== Full qualifying results ===
Pos.	#	Driver	Team	Make	Time	Speed
1	5	Geoff Bodine	Hendrick Motorsports	Chevrolet	20.014	112.419
2	43	Richard Petty	Petty Enterprises	Pontiac	20.040	112.273
3	25	Tim Richmond	Hendrick Motorsports	Chevrolet	20.055	112.191
4	44	Terry Labonte	Hagan Enterprises	Oldsmobile	20.108	111.895
5	3	Dale Earnhardt	Richard Childress Racing	Chevrolet	20.146	111.685
6	22	Bobby Allison	Stavola Brothers Racing	Buick	20.156	111.627
7	26	Joe Ruttman	King Racing	Buick	20.224	111.251
8	12	Neil Bonnett	Junior Johnson & Associates	Chevrolet	20.297	110.851
Failed to lock in Round 1
9	7	Kyle Petty	Wood Brothers Racing	Ford	20.213	111.315
10	11	Darrell Waltrip	Junior Johnson & Associates	Chevrolet	20.224	111.254
11	90	Ken Schrader	Donlavey Racing	Ford	20.231	111.215
12	35	Alan Kulwicki (R)	AK Racing	Ford	20.249	111.117
13	9	Bill Elliott	Melling Racing	Ford	20.251	111.106
14	15	Ricky Rudd	Bud Moore Engineering	Ford	20.252	111.100
15	27	Rusty Wallace	Blue Max Racing	Pontiac	20.266	111.023
16	33	Harry Gant	Mach 1 Racing	Chevrolet	20.293	110.876
17	75	Jody Ridley	RahMoc Enterprises	Pontiac	20.328	110.685
18	98	Ron Bouchard	Curb Racing	Pontiac	20.354	110.511
19	8	Bobby Hillin Jr.	Stavola Brothers Racing	Buick	20.371	110.451
20	17	Doug Heveron	Hamby Racing	Oldsmobile	20.384	110.381
21	71	Dave Marcis	Marcis Auto Racing	Chevrolet	20.390	110.348
22	48	Morgan Shepherd	Hylton Motorsports	Chevrolet	20.395	110.321
23	81	Chet Fillip (R)	Fillip Racing	Ford	20.446	110.046
24	23	Michael Waltrip (R)	Bahari Racing	Pontiac	20.491	109.804
25	67	Buddy Arrington	Arrington Racing	Ford	20.526	109.617
26	70	J. D. McDuffie	McDuffie Racing	Pontiac	20.567	109.399
27	6	Trevor Boys	U.S. Racing	Chevrolet	20.611	109.165
28	52	Jimmy Means	Jimmy Means Racing	Pontiac	20.638	109.022
29	30	Willy T. Ribbs	DiGard Motorsports	Chevrolet	20.639	109.017
30	64	Rick Baldwin	Langley Racing	Ford	20.739	108.491
Failed to qualify
31	85	Bobby Gerhart	Bobby Gerhart Racing	Chevrolet	-*	-*
32	94	Eddie Bierschwale	Eller Racing	Pontiac	-*	-*
33	96	Jerry Bowman	Jerry Bowman Racing	Ford	-*	-*
34	01	Earle Canavan	Canavan Racing	Pontiac	-*	-*
Official first round qualifying results
Official starting lineup

== Race results ==
Fin	St	#	Driver	Team	Make	Laps	Led	Status	Pts	Winnings
1	5	3	Dale Earnhardt	Richard Childress Racing	Chevrolet	400	195	running	185	$38,550
2	14	15	Ricky Rudd	Bud Moore Engineering	Ford	400	102	running	175	$20,075
3	1	5	Geoff Bodine	Hendrick Motorsports	Chevrolet	400	90	running	170	$17,415
4	10	11	Darrell Waltrip	Junior Johnson & Associates	Chevrolet	400	0	running	160	$13,750
5	7	26	Joe Ruttman	King Racing	Buick	400	0	running	155	$4,415
6	6	22	Bobby Allison	Stavola Brothers Racing	Buick	400	0	running	150	$6,865
7	16	33	Harry Gant	Mach 1 Racing	Chevrolet	400	1	running	151	$10,360
8	9	7	Kyle Petty	Wood Brothers Racing	Ford	400	0	running	142	$7,815
9	13	9	Bill Elliott	Melling Racing	Ford	400	0	running	138	$9,710
10	15	27	Rusty Wallace	Blue Max Racing	Pontiac	399	0	running	134	$8,410
11	8	12	Neil Bonnett	Junior Johnson & Associates	Chevrolet	399	0	running	130	$8,640
12	3	25	Tim Richmond	Hendrick Motorsports	Chevrolet	398	0	running	127	$5,185
13	19	8	Bobby Hillin Jr.	Stavola Brothers Racing	Buick	398	0	running	124	$4,715
14	11	90	Ken Schrader	Donlavey Racing	Ford	398	0	running	121	$5,450
15	17	75	Jody Ridley	RahMoc Enterprises	Pontiac	397	0	running	118	$4,535
16	20	17	Doug Heveron	Hamby Racing	Oldsmobile	395	0	running	115	$4,175
17	18	98	Ron Bouchard	Curb Racing	Pontiac	395	0	running	112	$4,040
18	12	35	Alan Kulwicki (R)	AK Racing	Ford	395	0	running	109	$1,655
19	22	48	Morgan Shepherd	Hylton Motorsports	Chevrolet	394	0	running	106	$3,880
20	28	52	Jimmy Means	Jimmy Means Racing	Pontiac	392	0	running	103	$3,995
21	25	67	Buddy Arrington	Arrington Racing	Ford	390	0	running	100	$3,515
22	29	30	Willy T. Ribbs	DiGard Motorsports	Chevrolet	387	0	running	97	$1,010
23	23	81	Chet Fillip (R)	Fillip Racing	Ford	374	0	running	94	$985
24	30	64	Rick Baldwin	Langley Racing	Ford	354	0	running	0	$3,150
25	21	71	Dave Marcis	Marcis Auto Racing	Chevrolet	346	0	accident	88	$3,215
26	24	23	Michael Waltrip (R)	Bahari Racing	Pontiac	309	0	engine	85	$910
27	4	44	Terry Labonte	Hagan Enterprises	Oldsmobile	256	1	engine	87	$6,635
28	26	70	J. D. McDuffie	McDuffie Racing	Pontiac	251	0	accident	79	$3,030
29	2	43	Richard Petty	Petty Enterprises	Pontiac	131	11	engine	81	$7,495
30	27	6	Trevor Boys	U.S. Racing	Chevrolet	85	0	accident	73	$2,335
Failed to qualify
31		85	Bobby Gerhart	Bobby Gerhart Racing	Chevrolet					
32		94	Eddie Bierschwale	Eller Racing	Pontiac					
33		96	Jerry Bowman	Jerry Bowman Racing	Ford					
34		01	Earle Canavan	Canavan Racing	Pontiac					
Official race results

== Standings after the race ==
Drivers' Championship standings

	Pos	Driver	Points
	1	Darrell Waltrip	1,160
	2	Dale Earnhardt	1,137 (-23)
	3	Rusty Wallace	1,019 (-141)
1	4	Bill Elliott	970 (–190)
1	5	Terry Labonte	948 (–212)
	6	Kyle Petty	927 (–233)
	7	Tim Richmond	900 (–260)
	8	Harry Gant	891 (–269)
2	9	Geoff Bodine	883 (–277)
	10	Bobby Allison	876 (–284)
Official driver's standings

- Note: Only the first 10 positions are included for the driver standings.

Previous race: 1986 TranSouth 500	NASCAR Winston Cup Series; 1986 season	Next race: 1986 Sovran Bank 500
