= 1986 Miller American 400 =

14th race of the 1986 NASCAR Winston Cup Series

Race details
- Race 14 of 29 in the 1986 NASCAR Winston Cup Series
- The 1986 Miller American 400 program cover, featuring Richard Petty. Petty made his thousandth career NASCAR Winston Cup Series start during the race.
- Date: June 15, 1986
- Official name: 18th Annual Miller American 400
- Location: Brooklyn, Michigan, Michigan International Speedway
- Course: Permanent racing facility
- Course length: 2 miles (3.2 km)
- Distance: 200 laps, 400 mi (643.737 km)
- Scheduled distance: 200 laps, 400 mi (643.737 km)
- Average speed: 138.851 miles per hour (223.459 km/h)
- Attendance: 80,000

Pole position
Driver	Tim Richmond	Hendrick Motorsports
- Time: 41.853

Most laps led
Driver	Harry Gant	Mach 1 Racing
- Laps: 66

Winner
No. 9	Bill Elliott	Melling Racing

Television in the United States
- Network: CBS
- Announcers: Ken Squier, Ned Jarrett

Radio in the United States
- Radio: Motor Racing Network

The 1986 Miller American 400 was the 14th stock car race of the 1986 NASCAR Winston Cup Series and the 18th iteration of the event. The race was held on Sunday, June 15, 1986, before an audience of 80,000 in Brooklyn, Michigan, at Michigan International Speedway, a two-mile (3.2 km) moderate-banked D-shaped speedway. The race took the scheduled 200 laps to complete.

In the late laps of the race, Melling Racing's Bill Elliott, who had been a non-contender throughout most of the race, made a late race surge to contest with the leader, Mach 1 Racing's Harry Gant. The two fought for the lead for around 50 laps until lap 195, when Elliott passed Gant and managed to hold off Gant the rest of the way to secure the victory. The victory was Elliott's 16th career NASCAR Winston Cup Series victory and his first victory of the season. To fill out the top three, Hendrick Motorsports' Geoff Bodine finished third.

During the race's qualifying session, Rick Baldwin, replacing the injured Buddy Arrington, was involved in a crash at the track's first turn during his qualifying lap. Baldwin's car spun, hitting the outside wall on the driver's side. As a result of the crash, Baldwin suffered head injuries that induced him into an 11-year coma that he did not recover from, dying on June 12, 1997. The incident was the first fatal accident in over a year in the NASCAR Winston Cup Series since Terry Schoonover at the 1984 Atlanta Journal 500.

== Background ==
The layout of Michigan International Speedway, the venue where the race was held.

The race was held at Michigan International Speedway, a two-mile (3.2 km) moderate-banked D-shaped speedway located in Brooklyn, Michigan. The track is used primarily for NASCAR events. It is known as a "sister track" to Texas World Speedway as MIS's oval design was a direct basis of TWS, with moderate modifications to the banking in the corners, and was used as the basis of Auto Club Speedway. The track is owned by International Speedway Corporation. Michigan International Speedway is recognized as one of motorsports' premier facilities because of its wide racing surface and high banking (by open-wheel standards; the 18-degree banking is modest by stock car standards).

=== Entry list ===
- (R) denotes rookie driver.

#	Driver	Team	Make	Sponsor
3	Dale Earnhardt	Richard Childress Racing	Chevrolet	Wrangler
4	Rick Wilson	Morgan–McClure Motorsports	Oldsmobile	Kodak
5	Geoff Bodine	Hendrick Motorsports	Chevrolet	Levi Garrett
6	D. K. Ulrich	U.S. Racing	Chevrolet	U.S. Racing
7	Kyle Petty	Wood Brothers Racing	Ford	7-Eleven
8	Bobby Hillin Jr.	Stavola Brothers Racing	Chevrolet	Miller American
08	Butch Miller	Throop Racing	Chevrolet	Classic Chevrolet
9	Bill Elliott	Melling Racing	Ford	Coors
11	Darrell Waltrip	Junior Johnson & Associates	Chevrolet	Budweiser
12	Neil Bonnett	Junior Johnson & Associates	Chevrolet	Budweiser
15	Ricky Rudd	Bud Moore Engineering	Ford	Motorcraft Quality Parts
17	Pancho Carter	Hamby Racing	Chevrolet	Kmart
18	Tommy Ellis	Freedlander Motorsports	Chevrolet	Freedlander Financial
22	Bobby Allison	Stavola Brothers Racing	Buick	Miller American
23	Michael Waltrip (R)	Bahari Racing	Pontiac	Hawaiian Punch
25	Tim Richmond	Hendrick Motorsports	Chevrolet	Folgers
26	Joe Ruttman	King Racing	Buick	Quaker State
27	Rusty Wallace	Blue Max Racing	Pontiac	Alugard
28	Cale Yarborough	Ranier-Lundy Racing	Ford	Hardee's
30	Willy T. Ribbs	DiGard Motorsports	Chevrolet	Red Roof Inn
33	Harry Gant	Mach 1 Racing	Chevrolet	Skoal Bandit
35	Alan Kulwicki (R)	AK Racing	Ford	Quincy's Steakhouse
38	Mike Laws	Laws Racing	Chevrolet	Laws Racing
43	Richard Petty	Petty Enterprises	Pontiac	STP
44	Terry Labonte	Hagan Enterprises	Oldsmobile	Piedmont Airlines
47	Morgan Shepherd	Race Hill Farm Team	Chevrolet	Race Hill Farm Team
48	James Hylton	Hylton Motorsports	Chevrolet	Hylton Motorsports
52	Jimmy Means	Jimmy Means Racing	Pontiac	Jimmy Means Racing
55	Benny Parsons	Jackson Bros. Motorsports	Oldsmobile	Copenhagen
64	Eddie Bierschwale	Langley Racing	Ford	Sunny King Ford
66	Phil Parsons	Jackson Bros. Motorsports	Oldsmobile	Skoal
67	Rick Baldwin	Arrington Racing	Ford	Pannill Sweatshirts
68	Jerry Holden	Holden Racing	Ford	Holden Racing
70	J. D. McDuffie	McDuffie Racing	Pontiac	Rumple Furniture
71	Dave Marcis	Marcis Auto Racing	Pontiac	Helen Rae Special
74	Bobby Wawak	Wawak Racing	Chevrolet	Wawak Racing
75	Jody Ridley	RahMoc Enterprises	Pontiac	Nationwise Automotive
79	Derrike Cope	Razore Racing	Ford	Peterbilt
80	Gary Fedewa	Burke Racing	Chevrolet	Burke Racing
81	Chet Fillip (R)	Fillip Racing	Ford	Circle Bar Truck Corral
82	Mark Stahl	Stahl Racing	Ford	Auto Bell Car Wash
88	Buddy Baker	Baker–Schiff Racing	Oldsmobile	Crisco
89	Jim Sauter	Mueller Brothers Racing	Pontiac	Evinrude Outboard Motors
90	Ken Schrader	Donlavey Racing	Ford	Red Baron Frozen Pizza
92	Jonathan Lee Edwards	Edwards Racing	Buick	Edwards Racing
98	Ron Bouchard	Curb Racing	Pontiac	Valvoline

== Qualifying ==
Qualifying was split into two rounds. The first round was held on Saturday, June 14, at 11:30 AM EST. Each driver had one lap to set a time. During the first round, the top 20 drivers in the round were guaranteed a starting spot in the race. If a driver was not able to guarantee a spot in the first round, they had the option to scrub their time from the first round and try and run a faster lap time in a second round qualifying run, held on Saturday, at 2:00 PM EST. As with the first round, each driver had one lap to set a time. For this specific race, positions 21-40 were decided on time, and depending on who needed it, a select amount of positions were given to cars who had not otherwise qualified but were high enough in owner's points; up to two were given.

Tim Richmond, driving for Hendrick Motorsports, won the pole, setting a time of 41.853 and an average speed of 172.031 miles per hour (276.857 km/h) in the first round.

Five drivers failed to qualify.

=== Crashes of Rick Baldwin and Mark Stahl ===
After Ricky Rudd made his qualifying lap, Rick Baldwin was scheduled to make his qualifying lap. Baldwin was tapped by owner-driver Buddy Arrington to qualify the car after Arrington suffered a concussion at the previous race, the 1986 Miller High Life 500. Arrington, if Baldwin had made the race, to start the race, then hand over driving duties to Baldwin so that Arrington could obtain driver's championship points for the race. Heading into the first turn of his qualifying lap, according to Detroit Free Press writer Charlie Vincent, "the car took control of the man and his fate. The car spun, slamming back-end into the wall, then the front end whipped around, smashing the driver's side of the car into the concrete... in an instant, he lost consciousness." After Baldwin wrecked, driver Mark Stahl also crashed in the first turn of his qualifying lap, suffering an ankle injury. Both drivers failed to qualify for the race. In the aftermath of Baldwin's incident, Baldwin was transported to the W. A. Foote Memorial Hospital in Jackson, Michigan where he was diagnosed with multiple head and neck injuries. Baldwin remained in a coma for 11 years, never fully recovering from his injuries and dying on June 12, 1997.

Responses from the NASCAR community to the accident displayed sympathy for Baldwin. Arrington, who fielded the car for his independent team that was running Ford products after being a Chrysler team even without factory support (the Arrington family continued to be associated with Chrysler, Daimler AG during their NASCAR days, and the new Chrysler LLC when current owners Fiat ended NASCAR support) stated, "I feel really bad about what happened. What else can I say?... He's a good kid." Corpus Christi Caller-Times writer Emil Tagliabue remarked Baldwin as chasing the dream to join the "clan of good ol' boys", stating, "There are those whom fate somehow seems to mock usually with no apparent good reason. Rick Baldwin is one of those."

=== Full qualifying results ===
Pos.	#	Driver	Team	Make	Time	Speed
1	25	Tim Richmond	Hendrick Motorsports	Chevrolet	41.853	172.031
2	55	Benny Parsons	Jackson Bros. Motorsports	Oldsmobile	42.015	171.367
3	33	Harry Gant	Mach 1 Racing	Chevrolet	42.078	171.111
4	5	Geoff Bodine	Hendrick Motorsports	Chevrolet	42.155	170.798
5	22	Bobby Allison	Stavola Brothers Racing	Buick	42.176	170.713
6	47	Morgan Shepherd	Race Hill Farm Team	Buick	42.213	170.564
7	27	Rusty Wallace	Blue Max Racing	Pontiac	42.245	170.434
8	9	Bill Elliott	Melling Racing	Ford	42.255	170.394
9	44	Terry Labonte	Hagan Enterprises	Oldsmobile	42.305	170.193
10	4	Rick Wilson	Morgan–McClure Motorsports	Oldsmobile	42.337	170.064
11	3	Dale Earnhardt	Richard Childress Racing	Chevrolet	42.344	170.036
12	8	Bobby Hillin Jr.	Stavola Brothers Racing	Buick	42.537	169.264
13	26	Joe Ruttman	King Racing	Buick	42.574	169.117
14	88	Buddy Baker	Baker–Schiff Racing	Oldsmobile	42.593	169.042
15	43	Richard Petty	Petty Enterprises	Pontiac	42.632	168.887
16	11	Darrell Waltrip	Junior Johnson & Associates	Chevrolet	42.708	168.587
17	75	Jody Ridley	RahMoc Enterprises	Pontiac	42.722	168.531
18	15	Ricky Rudd	Bud Moore Engineering	Ford	42.730	168.500
19	18	Tommy Ellis	Freedlander Motorsports	Chevrolet	42.751	168.417
20	12	Neil Bonnett	Junior Johnson & Associates	Chevrolet	42.843	168.055
Failed to lock in Round 1
21	66	Phil Parsons	Jackson Bros. Motorsports	Oldsmobile	42.474	169.515
22	17	Pancho Carter	Hamby Racing	Chevrolet	42.586	169.070
23	71	Dave Marcis	Marcis Auto Racing	Pontiac	42.768	168.350
24	90	Ken Schrader	Donlavey Racing	Ford	42.806	168.201
25	98	Ron Bouchard	Curb Racing	Pontiac	42.922	167.746
26	81	Chet Fillip (R)	Fillip Racing	Ford	42.979	167.524
27	79	Derrike Cope	Razore Racing	Ford	42.980	167.520
28	28	Cale Yarborough	Cale Yarborough Motorsports	Ford	42.996	167.457
29	08	Butch Miller	Throop Racing	Chevrolet	43.020	167.364
30	6	D. K. Ulrich	U.S. Racing	Chevrolet	43.036	167.302
31	7	Kyle Petty	Wood Brothers Racing	Ford	43.088	167.100
32	35	Alan Kulwicki (R)	AK Racing	Ford	43.100	167.053
33	89	Jim Sauter	Mueller Brothers Racing	Pontiac	43.137	166.910
34	64	Eddie Bierschwale	Langley Racing	Ford	43.301	166.278
35	38	Mike Laws	Laws Racing	Chevrolet	43.343	166.117
36	23	Michael Waltrip (R)	Bahari Racing	Pontiac	43.424	165.807
37	30	Willy T. Ribbs	DiGard Motorsports	Chevrolet	43.425	165.803
38	74	Bobby Wawak	Wawak Racing	Chevrolet	43.450	165.708
39	70	J. D. McDuffie	McDuffie Racing	Pontiac	43.534	165.388
40	80	Gary Fedewa	Burke Racing	Chevrolet	43.802	164.376
Provisional
41	48	James Hylton	Hylton Motorsports	Chevrolet	44.388	162.206
Failed to qualify
42	92	Jonathan Lee Edwards	Edwards Racing	Chevrolet	44.396	162.177
43	52	Jimmy Means	Jimmy Means Racing	Pontiac	-*	-*
44	68	Jerry Holden	Holden Racing	Ford	-*	-*
45	67	Rick Baldwin	Arrington Racing	Ford	-	-
46	82	Mark Stahl	Stahl Racing	Ford	-	-
Official starting lineup

== Race results ==
Fin	St	#	Driver	Team	Make	Laps	Led	Status	Pts	Winnings
1	8	9	Bill Elliott	Melling Racing	Ford	200	28	running	180	$56,900
2	3	33	Harry Gant	Mach 1 Racing	Chevrolet	200	66	running	180	$37,400
3	4	5	Geoff Bodine	Hendrick Motorsports	Chevrolet	200	55	running	170	$25,600
4	14	88	Buddy Baker	Baker–Schiff Racing	Oldsmobile	200	0	running	160	$11,825
5	16	11	Darrell Waltrip	Junior Johnson & Associates	Chevrolet	200	0	running	155	$21,625
6	11	3	Dale Earnhardt	Richard Childress Racing	Chevrolet	200	21	running	155	$17,650
7	12	8	Bobby Hillin Jr.	Stavola Brothers Racing	Buick	200	0	running	146	$12,305
8	10	4	Rick Wilson	Morgan–McClure Motorsports	Oldsmobile	200	0	running	142	$6,950
9	13	26	Joe Ruttman	King Racing	Buick	200	0	running	138	$10,845
10	18	15	Ricky Rudd	Bud Moore Engineering	Ford	200	0	running	134	$15,150
11	5	22	Bobby Allison	Stavola Brothers Racing	Buick	199	2	running	135	$12,175
12	9	44	Terry Labonte	Hagan Enterprises	Oldsmobile	199	0	running	127	$12,800
13	15	43	Richard Petty	Petty Enterprises	Pontiac	199	0	running	124	$8,625
14	19	18	Tommy Ellis	Freedlander Motorsports	Chevrolet	199	0	running	121	$6,165
15	1	25	Tim Richmond	Hendrick Motorsports	Chevrolet	199	8	running	123	$10,505
16	32	35	Alan Kulwicki (R)	AK Racing	Ford	198	1	running	120	$4,025
17	22	17	Pancho Carter	Hamby Racing	Chevrolet	198	0	running	112	$7,135
18	33	89	Jim Sauter	Mueller Brothers Racing	Pontiac	197	0	running	109	$3,075
19	7	27	Rusty Wallace	Blue Max Racing	Pontiac	195	0	running	106	$9,860
20	24	90	Ken Schrader	Donlavey Racing	Ford	195	0	running	103	$7,870
21	29	08	Butch Miller	Throop Racing	Chevrolet	195	0	running	100	$2,500
22	36	23	Michael Waltrip (R)	Bahari Racing	Pontiac	194	2	running	102	$2,385
23	40	80	Gary Fedewa	Burke Racing	Chevrolet	194	0	running	94	$2,275
24	38	74	Bobby Wawak	Wawak Racing	Chevrolet	188	0	running	91	$2,165
25	20	12	Neil Bonnett	Junior Johnson & Associates	Chevrolet	184	3	accident	93	$11,055
26	26	81	Chet Fillip (R)	Fillip Racing	Ford	182	0	accident	85	$1,970
27	34	64	Eddie Bierschwale	Langley Racing	Ford	180	0	overheating	82	$5,325
28	27	79	Derrike Cope	Razore Racing	Ford	173	0	running	79	$1,850
29	6	47	Morgan Shepherd	Race Hill Farm Team	Buick	139	11	transmission	81	$1,790
30	28	28	Cale Yarborough	Cale Yarborough Motorsports	Ford	130	2	accident	78	$1,730
31	35	38	Mike Laws	Laws Racing	Chevrolet	116	0	timing chain	70	$1,675
32	31	7	Kyle Petty	Wood Brothers Racing	Ford	108	0	engine	67	$8,625
33	21	66	Phil Parsons	Jackson Bros. Motorsports	Oldsmobile	104	0	engine	64	$2,075
34	17	75	Jody Ridley	RahMoc Enterprises	Pontiac	86	0	engine	61	$4,705
35	39	70	J. D. McDuffie	McDuffie Racing	Pontiac	83	1	valve	63	$4,510
36	25	98	Ron Bouchard	Curb Racing	Pontiac	80	0	engine	55	$1,435
37	23	71	Dave Marcis	Marcis Auto Racing	Pontiac	79	0	engine	52	$4,210
38	41	48	James Hylton	Hylton Motorsports	Chevrolet	73	0	transmission	49	$4,200
39	37	30	Willy T. Ribbs	DiGard Motorsports	Chevrolet	65	0	engine	46	$1,435
40	30	6	D. K. Ulrich	U.S. Racing	Chevrolet	27	0	engine	43	$4,180
41	2	55	Benny Parsons	Jackson Bros. Motorsports	Oldsmobile	4	0	engine	40	$2,425
Failed to qualify
42		92	Jonathan Lee Edwards	Edwards Racing	Chevrolet					
43		52	Jimmy Means	Jimmy Means Racing	Pontiac					
44		68	Jerry Holden	Holden Racing	Ford					
45		67	Rick Baldwin	Arrington Racing	Ford					
46		82	Mark Stahl	Stahl Racing	Ford					
Official race results

== Standings after the race ==
Drivers' Championship standings

	Pos	Driver	Points
	1	Dale Earnhardt	2,252
	2	Darrell Waltrip	2,001 (-251)
3	3	Bill Elliott	1,917 (-335)
1	4	Bobby Allison	1,910 (–342)
	5	Tim Richmond	1,865 (–387)
2	6	Rusty Wallace	1,856 (–396)
	7	Ricky Rudd	1,808 (–444)
1	8	Harry Gant	1,788 (–464)
1	9	Terry Labonte	1,753 (–499)
1	10	Geoff Bodine	1,701 (–551)
Official driver's standings

- Note: Only the first 10 positions are included for the driver standings.

Previous race: 1986 Miller High Life 500	NASCAR Winston Cup Series; 1986 season	Next race: 1986 Firecracker 400
