= 1986 Budweiser 500 =

10th race of the 1986 NASCAR Winston Cup Series

Race details
- Race 10 of 29 in the 1986 NASCAR Winston Cup Series
- The 1986 Budweiser 500 program cover.
- Date: May 18, 1986
- Official name: 18th Annual Budweiser 500
- Location: Dover, Delaware, Dover Downs International Speedway
- Course: Permanent racing facility
- Course length: 1 miles (1.6 km)
- Distance: 500 laps, 500 mi (804.672 km)
- Scheduled distance: 500 laps, 500 mi (804.672 km)
- Average speed: 115.009 miles per hour (185.089 km/h)
- Attendance: 51,000

Pole position
| Driver | Ricky Rudd | Bud Moore Engineering |
- Time: 26.046

Most laps led
| Driver | Harry Gant | Mach 1 Racing |
- Laps: 177

Winner
| No. 5 | Geoff Bodine | Hendrick Motorsports |

Television in the United States
- Network: Mizlou
- Announcers: Steve Grad, Dick Brooks

Radio in the United States
- Radio: Motor Racing Network

The 1986 Budweiser 500 was the 10th stock car race of the 1986 NASCAR Winston Cup Series and the 18th iteration of the event. The race was held on Sunday, May 18, 1986, before an audience of 51,000 in Dover, Delaware at Dover Downs International Speedway, a 1-mile (1.6 km) permanent oval-shaped racetrack. The race took the scheduled 500 laps to complete.

In a race of attrition, Hendrick Motorsports' Geoff Bodine was able to take advantage of an engine failure suffered by leader Harry Gant with less than 50 laps left in the race, gaining his fifth career NASCAR Winston Cup Series victory and his second and final victory of the season. To fill out the top three, Stavola Brothers Racing's Bobby Allison and Richard Childress Racing's Dale Earnhardt finished second and third, respectively.

== Background ==
The layout of Dover Downs International Speedway, the venue where the race was held.

Dover Downs International Speedway is an oval race track in Dover, Delaware, United States that has held at least two NASCAR races since it opened in 1969. In addition to NASCAR, the track also hosted USAC and the NTT IndyCar Series. The track features one layout, a 1-mile (1.6 km) concrete oval, with 24° banking in the turns and 9° banking on the straights. The speedway is owned and operated by Dover Motorsports.

The track, nicknamed "The Monster Mile", was built in 1969 by Melvin Joseph of Melvin L. Joseph Construction Company, Inc., with an asphalt surface, but was replaced with concrete in 1995. Six years later in 2001, the track's capacity moved to 135,000 seats, making the track have the largest capacity of sports venue in the mid-Atlantic. In 2002, the name changed to Dover International Speedway from Dover Downs International Speedway after Dover Downs Gaming and Entertainment split, making Dover Motorsports. From 2007 to 2009, the speedway worked on an improvement project called "The Monster Makeover", which expanded facilities at the track and beautified the track. After the 2014 season, the track's capacity was reduced to 95,500 seats.

=== Entry list ===
- (R) denotes rookie driver.

| # | Driver | Team | Make | Sponsor |
|---|---|---|---|---|
| 3 | Dale Earnhardt | Richard Childress Racing | Chevrolet | Wrangler |
| 03 | Howard Mark | Mark Racing | Chevrolet | Mark Racing |
| 5 | Geoff Bodine | Hendrick Motorsports | Chevrolet | Levi Garrett |
| 6 | Joe Booher | U.S. Racing | Chevrolet | U.S. Racing |
| 7 | Kyle Petty | Wood Brothers Racing | Ford | 7-Eleven |
| 8 | Bobby Hillin Jr. | Stavola Brothers Racing | Chevrolet | Miller American |
| 9 | Bill Elliott | Melling Racing | Ford | Coors |
| 11 | Darrell Waltrip | Junior Johnson & Associates | Chevrolet | Budweiser |
| 12 | Neil Bonnett | Junior Johnson & Associates | Chevrolet | Budweiser |
| 15 | Ricky Rudd | Bud Moore Engineering | Ford | Motorcraft Quality Parts |
| 17 | Doug Heveron | Hamby Racing | Chevrolet | Hesco Exhaust Systems |
| 18 | Tommy Ellis | Freedlander Motorsports | Chevrolet | Freedlander Financial |
| 20 | Rick Newsom | Newsom Racing | Buick | Newsom Racing |
| 22 | Bobby Allison | Stavola Brothers Racing | Buick | Miller American |
| 23 | Michael Waltrip (R) | Bahari Racing | Pontiac | Hawaiian Punch |
| 25 | Tim Richmond | Hendrick Motorsports | Chevrolet | Folgers |
| 26 | Joe Ruttman | King Racing | Buick | Quaker State |
| 27 | Rusty Wallace | Blue Max Racing | Pontiac | Alugard |
| 33 | Harry Gant | Mach 1 Racing | Chevrolet | Skoal Bandit |
| 35 | Alan Kulwicki (R) | AK Racing | Ford | Quincy's Steakhouse |
| 38 | Joe Fields | Beahr Racing | Ford | Beahr Racing |
| 43 | Richard Petty | Petty Enterprises | Pontiac | STP |
| 44 | Terry Labonte | Hagan Enterprises | Oldsmobile | Piedmont Airlines |
| 48 | Jerry Cranmer | Hylton Motorsports | Chevrolet | Hylton Motorsports |
| 52 | Jimmy Means | Jimmy Means Racing | Pontiac | Jimmy Means Racing |
| 64 | Rick Baldwin | Langley Racing | Ford | Sunny King Ford |
| 67 | Buddy Arrington | Arrington Racing | Ford | Pannill Sweatshirts |
| 68 | Jerry Holden | Holden Racing | Ford | Holden Racing |
| 70 | J. D. McDuffie | McDuffie Racing | Pontiac | Rumple Furniture |
| 71 | Dave Marcis | Marcis Auto Racing | Pontiac | Helen Rae Special |
| 75 | Jody Ridley | RahMoc Enterprises | Ford | Nationwise Automotive |
| 80 | Gary Fedewa | Burke Racing | Chevrolet | Burke Racing |
| 88 | Mike Potter | Jimmy Walker Enterprises | Ford | Jimmy Walker Enterprises |
| 90 | Ken Schrader | Donlavey Racing | Ford | Red Baron Frozen Pizza |
| 94 | Trevor Boys | Eller Racing | Pontiac | Kodak Film |
| 96 | Jerry Bowman | Jerry Bowman Racing | Ford | Precision Tune |
| 98 | Ron Bouchard | Curb Racing | Pontiac | Valvoline |

== Qualifying ==
Qualifying was split into two rounds. The first round was held on Saturday, May 17, at 10:00 AM EST. Each driver had one lap to set a time. During the first round, the top 20 drivers in the round were guaranteed a starting spot in the race. If a driver was not able to guarantee a spot in the first round, they had the option to scrub their time from the first round and try and run a faster lap time in a second round qualifying run, held on Saturday, at 3:00 PM EST. As with the first round, each driver had one lap to set a time. For this specific race, positions 21-40 were decided on time, and depending on who needed it, a select amount of positions were given to cars who had not otherwise qualified but were high enough in owner's points; up to two were given.

Ricky Rudd, driving for Bud Moore Engineering, won the pole, setting a time of 26.046 and an average speed of 138.217 miles per hour (222.439 km/h) in the first round.

No drivers failed to qualify.

=== Full qualifying results ===
| Pos. | # | Driver | Team | Make | Time | Speed |
|---|---|---|---|---|---|---|
| 1 | 15 | Ricky Rudd | Bud Moore Engineering | Ford | 26.046 | 138.217 |
| 2 | 3 | Dale Earnhardt | Richard Childress Racing | Chevrolet | 26.057 | 138.158 |
| 3 | 5 | Geoff Bodine | Hendrick Motorsports | Chevrolet | 26.129 | 137.777 |
| 4 | 43 | Richard Petty | Petty Enterprises | Pontiac | 26.163 | 137.598 |
| 5 | 44 | Terry Labonte | Hagan Enterprises | Oldsmobile | 26.193 | 137.441 |
| 6 | 11 | Darrell Waltrip | Junior Johnson & Associates | Chevrolet | 26.209 | 137.357 |
| 7 | 25 | Tim Richmond | Hendrick Motorsports | Chevrolet | 26.209 | 137.357 |
| 8 | 75 | Jody Ridley | RahMoc Enterprises | Pontiac | 26.307 | 136.845 |
| 9 | 26 | Joe Ruttman | King Racing | Buick | 26.344 | 136.653 |
| 10 | 22 | Bobby Allison | Stavola Brothers Racing | Buick | 26.372 | 136.508 |
| 11 | 18 | Tommy Ellis | Freedlander Motorsports | Chevrolet | 26.397 | 136.379 |
| 12 | 7 | Kyle Petty | Wood Brothers Racing | Ford | 26.408 | 136.322 |
| 13 | 71 | Dave Marcis | Marcis Auto Racing | Chevrolet | 26.415 | 136.286 |
| 14 | 33 | Harry Gant | Mach 1 Racing | Chevrolet | 26.423 | 136.244 |
| 15 | 12 | Neil Bonnett | Junior Johnson & Associates | Chevrolet | 26.448 | 136.116 |
| 16 | 90 | Ken Schrader | Donlavey Racing | Ford | 26.517 | 135.761 |
| 17 | 23 | Michael Waltrip (R) | Bahari Racing | Pontiac | 26.573 | 135.475 |
| 18 | 98 | Ron Bouchard | Curb Racing | Pontiac | 26.675 | 134.957 |
| 19 | 27 | Rusty Wallace | Blue Max Racing | Pontiac | 26.677 | 134.947 |
| 20 | 8 | Bobby Hillin Jr. | Stavola Brothers Racing | Buick | 26.708 | 134.791 |
Failed to lock in Round 1
| 21 | 9 | Bill Elliott | Melling Racing | Ford | 26.183 | 137.494 |
| 22 | 17 | Doug Heveron | Hamby Racing | Chevrolet | 26.728 | 134.690 |
| 23 | 70 | J. D. McDuffie | McDuffie Racing | Pontiac | 26.901 | 133.824 |
| 24 | 35 | Alan Kulwicki (R) | AK Racing | Ford | 26.927 | 133.694 |
| 25 | 67 | Buddy Arrington | Arrington Racing | Ford | 26.967 | 133.496 |
| 26 | 80 | Gary Fedewa | Burke Racing | Chevrolet | 27.050 | 133.086 |
| 27 | 64 | Rick Baldwin | Langley Racing | Ford | 27.056 | 133.057 |
| 28 | 48 | Jerry Cranmer | Hylton Motorsports | Chevrolet | 27.129 | 132.699 |
| 29 | 94 | Trevor Boys | Eller Racing | Pontiac | 27.167 | 132.514 |
| 30 | 38 | Joe Fields | Beahr Racing | Ford | 27.237 | 132.173 |
| 31 | 52 | Jimmy Means | Jimmy Means Racing | Pontiac | 27.454 | 131.128 |
| 32 | 96 | Jerry Bowman | Jerry Bowman Racing | Ford | 27.570 | 130.576 |
| 33 | 20 | Rick Newsom | Newsom Racing | Buick | 27.595 | 130.458 |
| 34 | 88 | Mike Potter | Jimmy Walker Enterprises | Ford | 27.798 | 129.505 |
| 35 | 6 | Joe Booher | U.S. Racing | Chevrolet | 28.307 | 127.177 |
| 36 | 03 | Howard Mark | Mark Racing | Chevrolet | 29.753 | 120.996 |
| 37 | 68 | Jerry Holden | Holden Racing | Ford | 29.791 | 120.842 |
Official starting lineup

== Race results ==
| Fin | St | # | Driver | Team | Make | Laps | Led | Status | Pts | Winnings |
|---|---|---|---|---|---|---|---|---|---|---|
| 1 | 3 | 5 | Geoff Bodine | Hendrick Motorsports | Chevrolet | 500 | 85 | running | 180 | $51,700 |
| 2 | 10 | 22 | Bobby Allison | Stavola Brothers Racing | Buick | 500 | 2 | running | 175 | $29,150 |
| 3 | 2 | 3 | Dale Earnhardt | Richard Childress Racing | Chevrolet | 499 | 57 | running | 170 | $24,900 |
| 4 | 1 | 15 | Ricky Rudd | Bud Moore Engineering | Ford | 498 | 0 | running | 160 | $18,875 |
| 5 | 6 | 11 | Darrell Waltrip | Junior Johnson & Associates | Chevrolet | 498 | 0 | running | 155 | $18,975 |
| 6 | 4 | 43 | Richard Petty | Petty Enterprises | Pontiac | 494 | 0 | running | 150 | $10,480 |
| 7 | 21 | 9 | Bill Elliott | Melling Racing | Ford | 493 | 0 | running | 146 | $14,800 |
| 8 | 20 | 8 | Bobby Hillin Jr. | Stavola Brothers Racing | Buick | 493 | 0 | running | 142 | $9,065 |
| 9 | 11 | 18 | Tommy Ellis | Freedlander Motorsports | Chevrolet | 493 | 9 | running | 143 | $4,100 |
| 10 | 16 | 90 | Ken Schrader | Donlavey Racing | Ford | 493 | 0 | running | 134 | $10,325 |
| 11 | 9 | 26 | Joe Ruttman | King Racing | Buick | 486 | 1 | running | 135 | $5,165 |
| 12 | 17 | 23 | Michael Waltrip (R) | Bahari Racing | Pontiac | 479 | 2 | running | 132 | $3,100 |
| 13 | 29 | 94 | Trevor Boys | Eller Racing | Pontiac | 473 | 0 | running | 124 | $2,350 |
| 14 | 14 | 33 | Harry Gant | Mach 1 Racing | Chevrolet | 470 | 177 | engine | 131 | $11,200 |
| 15 | 25 | 67 | Buddy Arrington | Arrington Racing | Ford | 469 | 0 | running | 118 | $6,055 |
| 16 | 28 | 48 | Jerry Cranmer | Hylton Motorsports | Chevrolet | 467 | 0 | running | 0 | $5,735 |
| 17 | 5 | 44 | Terry Labonte | Hagan Enterprises | Oldsmobile | 445 | 78 | engine | 117 | $10,250 |
| 18 | 8 | 75 | Jody Ridley | RahMoc Enterprises | Pontiac | 444 | 0 | accident | 109 | $5,475 |
| 19 | 12 | 7 | Kyle Petty | Wood Brothers Racing | Ford | 432 | 0 | running | 106 | $8,750 |
| 20 | 23 | 70 | J. D. McDuffie | McDuffie Racing | Pontiac | 383 | 0 | engine | 103 | $5,565 |
| 21 | 13 | 71 | Dave Marcis | Marcis Auto Racing | Chevrolet | 361 | 2 | steering | 105 | $4,855 |
| 22 | 26 | 80 | Gary Fedewa | Burke Racing | Chevrolet | 334 | 0 | engine | 97 | $1,600 |
| 23 | 24 | 35 | Alan Kulwicki (R) | AK Racing | Ford | 317 | 0 | overheating | 94 | $1,550 |
| 24 | 31 | 52 | Jimmy Means | Jimmy Means Racing | Pontiac | 302 | 0 | oil pressure | 91 | $4,545 |
| 25 | 33 | 20 | Rick Newsom | Newsom Racing | Buick | 260 | 0 | overheating | 88 | $1,600 |
| 26 | 19 | 27 | Rusty Wallace | Blue Max Racing | Pontiac | 242 | 0 | engine | 85 | $8,400 |
| 27 | 18 | 98 | Ron Bouchard | Curb Racing | Pontiac | 219 | 0 | engine | 82 | $1,350 |
| 28 | 15 | 12 | Neil Bonnett | Junior Johnson & Associates | Chevrolet | 179 | 87 | clutch | 84 | $8,330 |
| 29 | 32 | 96 | Jerry Bowman | Jerry Bowman Racing | Ford | 121 | 0 | handling | 76 | $1,250 |
| 30 | 37 | 68 | Jerry Holden | Holden Racing | Ford | 100 | 0 | brakes | 0 | $1,200 |
| 31 | 35 | 6 | Joe Booher | U.S. Racing | Chevrolet | 91 | 0 | engine | 70 | $3,925 |
| 32 | 7 | 25 | Tim Richmond | Hendrick Motorsports | Chevrolet | 85 | 0 | engine | 67 | $3,865 |
| 33 | 34 | 88 | Mike Potter | Jimmy Walker Enterprises | Ford | 73 | 0 | engine | 64 | $1,050 |
| 34 | 27 | 64 | Rick Baldwin | Langley Racing | Ford | 39 | 0 | engine | 0 | $3,755 |
| 35 | 22 | 17 | Doug Heveron | Hamby Racing | Chevrolet | 26 | 0 | engine | 58 | $3,635 |
| 36 | 36 | 03 | Howard Mark | Mark Racing | Chevrolet | 14 | 0 | overheating | 55 | $875 |
| 37 | 30 | 38 | Joe Fields | Beahr Racing | Ford | 0 | 0 | accident | 0 | $875 |
Official race results

== Standings after the race ==
Drivers' Championship standings

| | Pos | Driver | Points |
|---|---|---|---|
| | 1 | Dale Earnhardt | 1,587 |
| | 2 | Darrell Waltrip | 1,463 (-124) |
| 1 | 3 | Bobby Allison | 1,373 (-214) |
| 1 | 4 | Terry Labonte | 1,306 (–281) |
| 2 | 5 | Rusty Wallace | 1,301 (–286) |
| 1 | 6 | Bill Elliott | 1,287 (–300) |
| 3 | 7 | Geoff Bodine | 1,262 (–325) |
| 2 | 8 | Kyle Petty | 1,258 (–329) |
| | 9 | Harry Gant | 1,215 (–372) |
| 2 | 10 | Ricky Rudd | 1,202 (–385) |
Official driver's standings

- Note: Only the first 10 positions are included for the driver standings.

| Previous race: 1986 Winston 500 | NASCAR Winston Cup Series; 1986 season | Next race: 1986 Coca-Cola 600 |
