= 1986 Southern 500 =

21st race of the 1986 NASCAR Winston Cup Series

Race details
- Race 21 of 29 in the 1986 NASCAR Winston Cup Series
- The 1986 Southern 500 program cover.
- Date: August 31, 1986
- Official name: 37th Annual Southern 500
- Location: Darlington Raceway, Darlington, South Carolina
- Course: Permanent racing facility
- Course length: 1.366 miles (2.221 km)
- Distance: 367 laps, 501.322 mi (806.799 km)
- Scheduled distance: 367 laps, 501.322 mi (806.799 km)
- Average speed: 121.068 miles per hour (194.840 km/h)
- Attendance: 69,000

Pole position
Driver	Tim Richmond	Hendrick Motorsports
- Time: 31.028

Most laps led
Driver	Tim Richmond	Hendrick Motorsports
- Laps: 168

Winner
No. 25	Tim Richmond	Hendrick Motorsports

Television in the United States
- Network: ESPN
- Announcers: Bob Jenkins

Radio in the United States
- Radio: Motor Racing Network

The 1986 Southern 500 was the 21st stock car race of the 1986 NASCAR Winston Cup Series season and the 37th iteration of the event. The race was held on Sunday, August 31, 1986, before an audience of 69,000 in Darlington, South Carolina, at Darlington Raceway, a 1.366 miles (2.198 km) permanent egg-shaped oval racetrack. The race took the scheduled 367 laps to complete. At race's end, Hendrick Motorsports driver Tim Richmond would manage to make a late-race move for the lead with seven to go to win his ninth career NASCAR Winston Cup Series victory and his fourth victory of the season. To fill out the podium, Stavola Brothers Racing driver Bobby Allison and Melling Racing driver Bill Elliott would finish second and third, respectively.

== Background ==
The layout of Darlington Raceway, the venue where the race was held.

Darlington Raceway is a race track built for NASCAR racing located near Darlington, South Carolina. It is nicknamed "The Lady in Black" and "The Track Too Tough to Tame" by many NASCAR fans and drivers and advertised as "A NASCAR Tradition." It is of a unique, somewhat egg-shaped design, an oval with the ends of very different configurations, a condition which supposedly arose from the proximity of one end of the track to a minnow pond the owner refused to relocate. This situation makes it very challenging for the crews to set up their cars' handling in a way that is effective at both ends.

=== Entry list ===
- (R) denotes rookie driver.

#	Driver	Team	Make	Sponsor
1	Sterling Marlin	Ellington Racing	Chevrolet	Bull's-Eye Barbecue Sauce
3	Dale Earnhardt	Richard Childress Racing	Chevrolet	Wrangler
4	Rick Wilson	Morgan–McClure Motorsports	Oldsmobile	Kodak
5	Geoff Bodine	Hendrick Motorsports	Chevrolet	Levi Garrett
6	D. K. Ulrich	U.S. Racing	Chevrolet	Finky's
7	Kyle Petty	Wood Brothers Racing	Ford	7-Eleven
8	Bobby Hillin Jr.	Stavola Brothers Racing	Buick	Miller American
9	Bill Elliott	Melling Racing	Ford	Coors Light
11	Darrell Waltrip	Junior Johnson & Associates	Chevrolet	Budweiser
12	Neil Bonnett	Junior Johnson & Associates	Chevrolet	Budweiser
15	Ricky Rudd	Bud Moore Engineering	Ford	Motorcraft
17	Eddie Bierschwale	Hamby Motorsports	Chevrolet	Kmart
22	Bobby Allison	Stavola Brothers Racing	Buick	Miller American
23	Michael Waltrip (R)	Bahari Racing	Pontiac	Hawaiian Punch
25	Tim Richmond	Hendrick Motorsports	Chevrolet	Folgers
26	Joe Ruttman	King Racing	Buick	Quaker State
27	Rusty Wallace	Blue Max Racing	Pontiac	Alugard
28	Cale Yarborough	Ranier-Lundy Racing	Ford	Hardee's
33	Harry Gant	Mach 1 Racing	Chevrolet	Skoal Bandit
35	Alan Kulwicki (R)	AK Racing	Ford	Quincy's Steak House
36	H. B. Bailey	Bailey Racing	Pontiac	Almeda Auto Parts
43	Richard Petty	Petty Enterprises	Pontiac	STP
44	Terry Labonte	Hagan Racing	Chevrolet	Piedmont Airlines
47	Morgan Shepherd	Race Hill Farm Team	Buick	Race Hill Farm Team
48	James Hylton	Hylton Motorsports	Chevrolet	Hemmel Garn & Sons
52	Jimmy Means	Jimmy Means Racing	Pontiac	Jimmy Means Racing
54	Donnie Allison	Gray Racing	Chevrolet	Gray Racing
55	Benny Parsons	Jackson Bros. Motorsports	Oldsmobile	Copenhagen
64	Connie Saylor	Langley Racing	Ford	Sunny King Ford & Honda
66	Phil Parsons	Jackson Bros. Motorsports	Oldsmobile	Skoal
67	Buddy Arrington	Arrington Racing	Ford	Pannill Sweatshirts
70	J. D. McDuffie	McDuffie Racing	Pontiac	Rumple Furniture
71	Dave Marcis	Marcis Auto Racing	Chevrolet	Helen Rae Special
75	Jim Sauter	RahMoc Enterprises	Pontiac	Nationwise Automotive
81	Chet Fillip (R)	Circle Bar Racing	Ford	Circle Bar Truck Corral
82	Mark Stahl	Stahl Racing	Ford	Auto Bell Car Wash
88	Buddy Baker	Baker-Schiff Racing	Oldsmobile	Crisco
90	Ken Schrader	Donlavey Racing	Ford	Red Baron Frozen Pizza
92	Jonathan Edwards	Edwards Racing	Chevrolet	Edwards Racing
98	Ron Bouchard	Curb Racing	Pontiac	Valvoline

== Qualifying ==
Qualifying was split into two rounds. Pole qualifying for the race was held on Thursday, August 28, 1986. Per the NASCAR rules in 1986, a one-lap qualifying attempt was utilized. The top twenty cars in pole qualifying were locked into the starting field. The remainder of the cars could stand on their time, or make a new attempt in second-round qualifying. If a driver did decide to make an attempt, their first-round times would be scrubbed. Second-round qualifying was held Friday August 29, 1986. The drivers that had qualified 1st–20th on Thursday were locked-in to those positions and did not have to re-qualify.

Tim Richmond, driving for Hendrick Motorsports, would win the pole, setting a time of 31.028 and an average speed of 158.489 miles per hour (255.063 km/h).

During pole qualifying, Richard Childress Racing driver Dale Earnhardt would crash in turn three during his qualifying run. According to Earnhardt, he "just lost it. I just went into turn three too hard and the car got away from me." Earnhardt would eventually qualify 21st, taking the first spot outside of the top 20.

No drivers would fail to qualify.

=== Full qualifying results ===
Pos.	#	Driver	Team	Make	Time	Speed
1	25	Tim Richmond	Hendrick Motorsports	Chevrolet	31.028	158.489
2	5	Geoff Bodine	Hendrick Motorsports	Chevrolet	31.204	157.595
3	12	Neil Bonnett	Junior Johnson & Associates	Chevrolet	31.209	157.570
4	33	Harry Gant	Mach 1 Racing	Chevrolet	31.303	157.097
5	88	Buddy Baker	Baker-Schiff Racing	Oldsmobile	31.389	156.666
6	8	Bobby Hillin Jr.	Stavola Brothers Racing	Buick	31.443	156.397
7	44	Terry Labonte	Hagan Racing	Chevrolet	31.492	156.154
8	28	Cale Yarborough	Ranier-Lundy Racing	Ford	31.499	156.119
9	55	Benny Parsons	Jackson Bros. Motorsports	Oldsmobile	31.507	156.080
10	11	Darrell Waltrip	Junior Johnson & Associates	Chevrolet	31.539	155.921
11	22	Bobby Allison	Stavola Brothers Racing	Buick	31.544	155.897
12	4	Rick Wilson	Morgan–McClure Motorsports	Oldsmobile	31.603	155.605
13	1	Sterling Marlin	Ellington Racing	Chevrolet	31.639	155.428
14	9	Bill Elliott	Melling Racing	Ford	31.649	155.379
15	15	Ricky Rudd	Bud Moore Engineering	Ford	31.652	155.365
16	27	Rusty Wallace	Blue Max Racing	Pontiac	31.759	154.841
17	66	Phil Parsons	Jackson Bros. Motorsports	Oldsmobile	31.786	154.710
18	26	Joe Ruttman	King Racing	Buick	31.890	154.205
19	43	Richard Petty	Petty Enterprises	Pontiac	31.922	154.050
20	47	Morgan Shepherd	Race Hill Farm Team	Buick	32.058	153.397
Failed to lock in Round 1
21	3	Dale Earnhardt	Richard Childress Racing	Chevrolet	31.409	156.567
22	75	Jim Sauter	RahMoc Enterprises	Pontiac	32.092	153.234
23	35	Alan Kulwicki (R)	AK Racing	Ford	32.203	152.706
24	7	Kyle Petty	Wood Brothers Racing	Ford	32.236	152.550
25	71	Dave Marcis	Marcis Auto Racing	Chevrolet	32.399	151.782
26	98	Ron Bouchard	Curb Racing	Pontiac	32.431	151.633
27	23	Michael Waltrip (R)	Bahari Racing	Pontiac	32.483	151.390
28	17	Eddie Bierschwale	Hamby Motorsports	Chevrolet	32.512	151.255
29	81	Chet Fillip (R)	Circle Bar Racing	Ford	32.528	151.181
30	54	Donnie Allison	Gray Racing	Chevrolet	32.529	151.176
31	6	D. K. Ulrich	U.S. Racing	Chevrolet	32.550	151.078
32	90	Ken Schrader	Donlavey Racing	Ford	32.644	150.643
33	70	J. D. McDuffie	McDuffie Racing	Pontiac	32.759	150.114
34	64	Connie Saylor	Langley Racing	Ford	32.902	149.462
35	36	H. B. Bailey	Bailey Racing	Pontiac	32.926	149.353
36	52	Jimmy Means	Jimmy Means Racing	Pontiac	33.066	148.721
37	67	Buddy Arrington	Arrington Racing	Ford	33.077	148.671
38	92	Jonathan Edwards	Edwards Racing	Chevrolet	33.565	146.510
39	82	Mark Stahl	Stahl Racing	Ford	34.188	143.840
40	48	James Hylton	Hylton Motorsports	Chevrolet	35.010	140.463
Official qualifying results

== Race results ==
Fin	St	#	Driver	Team	Make	Laps	Led	Status	Pts	Winnings
1	1	25	Tim Richmond	Hendrick Motorsports	Chevrolet	367	168	running	185	$60,005
2	11	22	Bobby Allison	Stavola Brothers Racing	Buick	367	2	running	175	$31,500
3	14	9	Bill Elliott	Melling Racing	Ford	367	8	running	170	$25,625
4	20	47	Morgan Shepherd	Race Hill Farm Team	Buick	367	4	running	165	$11,125
5	10	11	Darrell Waltrip	Junior Johnson & Associates	Chevrolet	367	0	running	155	$21,055
6	15	15	Ricky Rudd	Bud Moore Engineering	Ford	367	0	running	150	$15,735
7	6	8	Bobby Hillin Jr.	Stavola Brothers Racing	Buick	367	0	running	146	$11,010
8	2	5	Geoff Bodine	Hendrick Motorsports	Chevrolet	367	162	running	147	$13,215
9	21	3	Dale Earnhardt	Richard Childress Racing	Chevrolet	366	17	running	143	$15,735
10	8	28	Cale Yarborough	Ranier-Lundy Racing	Ford	366	0	running	134	$6,435
11	25	71	Dave Marcis	Marcis Auto Racing	Chevrolet	364	0	running	130	$8,730
12	23	35	Alan Kulwicki (R)	AK Racing	Ford	360	0	running	127	$5,390
13	22	75	Jim Sauter	RahMoc Enterprises	Pontiac	356	0	running	124	$8,295
14	24	7	Kyle Petty	Wood Brothers Racing	Ford	356	0	running	121	$11,070
15	36	52	Jimmy Means	Jimmy Means Racing	Pontiac	354	0	running	118	$8,165
16	27	23	Michael Waltrip (R)	Bahari Racing	Pontiac	354	0	running	115	$5,605
17	35	36	H. B. Bailey	Bailey Racing	Pontiac	352	1	running	117	$3,610
18	31	6	D. K. Ulrich	U.S. Racing	Chevrolet	350	0	running	109	$7,140
19	5	88	Buddy Baker	Baker-Schiff Racing	Oldsmobile	340	1	engine	111	$3,315
20	37	67	Buddy Arrington	Arrington Racing	Ford	339	0	running	103	$7,030
21	7	44	Terry Labonte	Hagan Racing	Chevrolet	337	0	running	100	$9,910
22	17	66	Phil Parsons	Jackson Bros. Motorsports	Oldsmobile	326	0	engine	97	$2,810
23	16	27	Rusty Wallace	Blue Max Racing	Pontiac	316	0	running	94	$9,710
24	3	12	Neil Bonnett	Junior Johnson & Associates	Chevrolet	261	4	valve	96	$11,015
25	28	17	Eddie Bierschwale	Hamby Motorsports	Chevrolet	261	0	running	88	$5,825
26	34	64	Connie Saylor	Langley Racing	Ford	254	0	engine	85	$5,475
27	4	33	Harry Gant	Mach 1 Racing	Chevrolet	235	0	engine	82	$10,940
28	12	4	Rick Wilson	Morgan–McClure Motorsports	Oldsmobile	232	0	overheating	79	$2,245
29	38	92	Jonathan Edwards	Edwards Racing	Chevrolet	203	0	rear end	76	$2,155
30	26	98	Ron Bouchard	Curb Racing	Pontiac	177	0	engine	73	$2,100
31	9	55	Benny Parsons	Jackson Bros. Motorsports	Oldsmobile	167	0	transmission	70	$1,955
32	39	82	Mark Stahl	Stahl Racing	Ford	132	0	flagged	67	$1,895
33	30	54	Donnie Allison	Gray Racing	Chevrolet	131	0	overheating	64	$1,840
34	33	70	J. D. McDuffie	McDuffie Racing	Pontiac	85	0	tie rod	61	$4,565
35	29	81	Chet Fillip (R)	Circle Bar Racing	Ford	81	0	accident	58	$1,720
36	32	90	Ken Schrader	Donlavey Racing	Ford	46	0	engine	55	$5,435
37	13	1	Sterling Marlin	Ellington Racing	Chevrolet	35	0	battery	52	$1,620
38	18	26	Joe Ruttman	King Racing	Buick	32	0	valve	49	$4,325
39	40	48	James Hylton	Hylton Motorsports	Chevrolet	29	0	engine	46	$4,260
40	19	43	Richard Petty	Petty Enterprises	Pontiac	6	0	accident	43	$3,470
Official race results

Previous race: 1986 Busch 500	NASCAR Winston Cup Series; 1986 season	Next race: 1986 Wrangler Jeans Indigo 400
