= 1986 Coca-Cola 600 =

11th race of the 1986 NASCAR Winston Cup Series

Race details
- Race 11 of 29 in the 1986 NASCAR Winston Cup Series
- The 1986 Coca-Cola 600 program cover, featuring Terry Labonte. Artwork by NASCAR artist Sam Bass.
- Date: May 25, 1986
- Official name: 27th Annual Coca-Cola 600
- Location: Concord, North Carolina, Charlotte Motor Speedway
- Course: Permanent racing facility
- Course length: 1.5 miles (2.414 km)
- Distance: 400 laps, 600 mi (965.606 km)
- Average speed: 140.406 miles per hour (225.962 km/h)
- Attendance: 158,000

Pole position
Driver	Geoff Bodine	Hendrick Motorsports
- Time: 32.824

Most laps led
Driver	Cale Yarborough; Bill Elliott	Ranier-Lundy Racing; Melling Racing
- Laps: 98

Winner
No. 3	Dale Earnhardt	Richard Childress Racing

Television in the United States
- Network: Jefferson-Pilot
- Announcers: Mike Hogewood, Jerry Punch

Radio in the United States
- Radio: WSOC-FM

The 1986 Coca-Cola 600 was the 11th stock car race of the 1986 NASCAR Winston Cup Series and the 27th iteration of the event. The race was held on Sunday, May 25, 1986, before an audience of 158,000 in Concord, North Carolina, at Charlotte Motor Speedway, a 1.5 miles (2.4 km) permanent quad-oval. The race took the scheduled 400 laps to complete.

After a poor start, Richard Childress Racing's Dale Earnhardt, crediting crew chief Kirk Shelmerdine, made several changes to the car afterward, making an improvement. As a result, Earnhardt steadily climbed through the field in the final stages of the race, taking the lead when Bill Elliott pitted for fuel with less than 20 laps left in the race, securing the victory. The victory was Earnhardt's 18th career NASCAR Winston Cup Series victory and his third victory of the season. To fill out the top three, Hendrick Motorsports' Tim Richmond and Ranier-Lundy Racing's Cale Yarborough finished second and third, respectively.

== Background ==
The layout of Charlotte Motor Speedway, the venue where the race was held.

Charlotte Motor Speedway is a motorsports complex located in Concord, North Carolina, United States 13 miles from Charlotte, North Carolina. The complex features a 1.5 miles (2.4 km) quad oval track that hosts NASCAR racing including the prestigious Coca-Cola 600 on Memorial Day weekend and the NEXTEL All-Star Challenge, as well as the UAW-GM Quality 500. The speedway was built in 1959 by Bruton Smith and is considered the home track for NASCAR with many race teams located in the Charlotte area. The track is owned and operated by Speedway Motorsports Inc. (SMI) with Marcus G. Smith (son of Bruton Smith) as track president.

=== Entry list ===
- (R) denotes rookie driver.

#	Driver	Team	Make	Sponsor
1	Sterling Marlin	Ellington Racing	Chevrolet	Bull's-Eye Barbecue Sauce
2	Brett Bodine	Hendrick Motorsports	Chevrolet	Exxon
02	Mark Martin	Gunderman Racing	Ford	Gunderman Racing
3	Dale Earnhardt	Richard Childress Racing	Chevrolet	Wrangler
4	Lake Speed	Morgan–McClure Motorsports	Oldsmobile	All Pro Auto Parts
5	Geoff Bodine	Hendrick Motorsports	Chevrolet	Levi Garrett
6	D. K. Ulrich (Note: Petty crashed his car in a Friday practice session, terminally damaging his only car. As a result, both Petty and his sponsor, STP, paid D. K. Ulrich to drive his car for the race.)	U.S. Racing	Chevrolet	STP
7	Kyle Petty	Wood Brothers Racing	Ford	7-Eleven
8	Bobby Hillin Jr.	Stavola Brothers Racing	Chevrolet	Miller American
9	Bill Elliott	Melling Racing	Ford	Coors
10	Greg Sacks	DiGard Motorsports	Pontiac	TRW Automotive
11	Darrell Waltrip	Junior Johnson & Associates	Chevrolet	Budweiser
12	Neil Bonnett	Junior Johnson & Associates	Chevrolet	Budweiser
15	Ricky Rudd	Bud Moore Engineering	Ford	Motorcraft Quality Parts
17	Doug Heveron	Hamby Racing	Chevrolet	Kmart
18	Tommy Ellis	Freedlander Motorsports	Chevrolet	Freedlander Financial
21	David Pearson	Pearson Racing	Chevrolet	Chattanooga Chew
22	Bobby Allison	Stavola Brothers Racing	Buick	Miller American
23	Michael Waltrip (R)	Bahari Racing	Pontiac	Hawaiian Punch
25	Tim Richmond	Hendrick Motorsports	Chevrolet	Folgers
26	Joe Ruttman	King Racing	Buick	Quaker State
27	Rusty Wallace	Blue Max Racing	Pontiac	Alugard
28	Cale Yarborough	Ranier-Lundy Racing	Ford	Hardee's
30	Willy T. Ribbs	DiGard Motorsports	Chevrolet	Red Roof Inn
32	Eddie Bierschwale	Ingle Racing	Chevrolet	Ingle Racing
33	Harry Gant	Mach 1 Racing	Chevrolet	Skoal Bandit
35	Alan Kulwicki (R)	AK Racing	Ford	Quincy's Steakhouse
43	Richard Petty	Petty Enterprises	Pontiac	STP
44	Terry Labonte	Hagan Enterprises	Oldsmobile	Piedmont Airlines
45	Ken Ragan	Morris Racing	Pontiac	Morris Racing
47	Morgan Shepherd	Race Hill Farm Team	Chevrolet	Race Hill Farm Team
51	Connie Saylor	Spohn Racing	Ford	Spohn Racing
52	Jimmy Means	Jimmy Means Racing	Pontiac	Jimmy Means Racing
55	Benny Parsons	Jackson Bros. Motorsports	Oldsmobile	Copenhagen
66	Phil Parsons	Jackson Bros. Motorsports	Oldsmobile	Skoal
67	Buddy Arrington	Arrington Racing	Ford	Pannill Sweatshirts
70	J. D. McDuffie	McDuffie Racing	Pontiac	Rumple Furniture
71	Dave Marcis	Marcis Auto Racing	Pontiac	Helen Rae Special
75	Jody Ridley	RahMoc Enterprises	Pontiac	Nationwise Automotive
79	Derrike Cope	Razore Racing	Ford	Peterbilt
81	Chet Fillip (R)	Fillip Racing	Ford	Circle Bar Truck Corral
88	Buddy Baker	Baker–Schiff Racing	Oldsmobile	Crisco
90	Ken Schrader	Donlavey Racing	Ford	Red Baron Frozen Pizza
94	Trevor Boys	Eller Racing	Pontiac	Kodak Film
98	Ron Bouchard	Curb Racing	Pontiac	Valvoline
99	Brad Teague	Ball Motorsports	Chevrolet	Ball Motorsports

== Qualifying ==
Qualifying was split into three rounds. The first round was held on Wednesday, May 21, at 4:00 PM EST. Each driver had one lap to set a time. During the first round, the top 15 drivers in the round were guaranteed a starting spot in the race. If a driver was not able to guarantee a spot in the first round, they had the option to scrub their time from the first round and try and run a faster lap time in a second round qualifying run, held on Thursday, May 22, at 2:00 PM EST. As with the first round, each driver had one lap to set a time. Positions 16-30 were decided on times in the second round. The third round was held on Friday, May 23, at 12:30 PM EST; if a driver was not able to guarantee a starting spot in the previous two rounds, they had the option to scrub their time again and run in the third round. As with the previous two rounds, each driver had one lap to set a time. Positions 31-40 were determined on times in the third round. Depending on who needed it, a select amount of positions were given to cars who had not otherwise qualified but were high enough in owner's points; up to two were given.

Geoff Bodine, driving for Hendrick Motorsports, won the pole, setting a time of 32.824 and an average speed of 164.511 miles per hour (264.755 km/h) in the first round.

Four drivers failed to qualify.

=== Full qualifying results ===
Pos.	#	Driver	Team	Make	Time	Speed
1	5	Geoff Bodine	Hendrick Motorsports	Chevrolet	32.824	164.511
2	25	Tim Richmond	Hendrick Motorsports	Chevrolet	32.840	164.431
3	3	Dale Earnhardt	Richard Childress Racing	Chevrolet	32.958	163.842
4	1	Sterling Marlin	Ellington Racing	Chevrolet	33.068	163.297
5	9	Bill Elliott	Melling Racing	Ford	33.119	163.048
6	55	Benny Parsons	Jackson Bros. Motorsports	Oldsmobile	33.139	162.948
7	21	David Pearson	Pearson Racing	Chevrolet	33.164	162.828
8	33	Harry Gant	Mach 1 Racing	Chevrolet	33.238	162.465
9	27	Rusty Wallace	Blue Max Racing	Pontiac	33.255	162.379
10	47	Morgan Shepherd	Race Hill Farm Team	Buick	33.299	162.166
11	12	Neil Bonnett	Junior Johnson & Associates	Chevrolet	33.349	161.923
12	28	Cale Yarborough	Ranier-Lundy Racing	Ford	33.364	161.850
13	15	Ricky Rudd	Bud Moore Engineering	Ford	33.394	161.707
14	02	Mark Martin	Gunderman Racing	Ford	33.441	161.477
15	11	Darrell Waltrip	Junior Johnson & Associates	Chevrolet	32.849	164.389
Failed to lock in Round 1
16	44	Terry Labonte	Hagan Enterprises	Oldsmobile	32.862	164.324
17	7	Kyle Petty	Wood Brothers Racing	Ford	33.068	163.300
18	22	Bobby Allison	Stavola Brothers Racing	Buick	33.133	162.980
19	4	Lake Speed	Morgan–McClure Motorsports	Oldsmobile	33.158	162.857
20	66	Phil Parsons	Jackson Bros. Motorsports	Oldsmobile	33.200	162.651
21	51	Connie Saylor	Spohn Racing	Ford	33.221	162.548
22	8	Bobby Hillin Jr.	Stavola Brothers Racing	Buick	33.236	162.474
23	26	Joe Ruttman	King Racing	Buick	33.260	162.357
24	75	Jody Ridley	RahMoc Enterprises	Pontiac	33.272	162.299
25	10	Greg Sacks	DiGard Motorsports	Chevrolet	33.279	162.264
26	99	Brad Teague	Ball Motorsports	Chevrolet	33.283	162.245
27	90	Ken Schrader	Donlavey Racing	Ford	33.295	162.187
28	81	Chet Fillip (R)	Fillip Racing	Ford	33.297	162.177
29	35	Alan Kulwicki (R)	AK Racing	Ford	33.308	162.123
30	88	Buddy Baker	Baker–Schiff Racing	Oldsmobile	32.671	165.284
Failed to lock in Round 2
31	98	Ron Bouchard	Curb Racing	Pontiac	32.831	164.479
32	2	Brett Bodine	Hendrick Motorsports	Chevrolet	32.872	164.274
33	17	Doug Heveron	Hamby Racing	Chevrolet	32.894	164.164
34	23	Michael Waltrip (R)	Bahari Racing	Pontiac	32.918	164.044
35	79	Derrike Cope	Razore Racing	Ford	33.057	163.354
36	45	Ken Ragan	Morris Racing	Pontiac	33.073	163.275
37	6	D. K. Ulrich	U.S. Racing	Chevrolet	33.077	163.255
38	32	Eddie Bierschwale	Ingle Racing	Chevrolet	33.143	162.930
39	94	Trevor Boys	Eller Racing	Pontiac	33.245	162.430
Provisionals
40	18	Tommy Ellis	Freedlander Motorsports	Chevrolet	33.489	161.247
41	71	Dave Marcis	Marcis Auto Racing	Ford	-	-
Failed to qualify
42	67	Buddy Arrington	Arrington Racing	Ford	33.276	162.279
43	52	Jimmy Means	Jimmy Means Racing	Pontiac	33.309	162.118
44	30	Willy T. Ribbs	DiGard Motorsports	Chevrolet	33.329	162.021
45	70	J. D. McDuffie	McDuffie Racing	Pontiac	33.969	158.968
Withdrew after qualifying
WD	43	Richard Petty	Petty Enterprises	Pontiac	33.441	161.476
Official first round qualifying results
Official second round qualifying results
Official starting lineup

== Race results ==
Fin	St	#	Driver	Team	Make	Laps	Led	Status	Pts	Winnings
1	3	3	Dale Earnhardt	Richard Childress Racing	Chevrolet	400	26	running	180	$98,150
2	2	25	Tim Richmond	Hendrick Motorsports	Chevrolet	400	94	running	175	$64,355
3	12	28	Cale Yarborough	Ranier-Lundy Racing	Ford	400	98	running	175	$34,375
4	8	33	Harry Gant	Mach 1 Racing	Chevrolet	400	50	running	165	$35,630
5	15	11	Darrell Waltrip	Junior Johnson & Associates	Chevrolet	400	3	running	160	$27,250
6	5	9	Bill Elliott	Melling Racing	Ford	400	98	running	160	$34,750
7	4	1	Sterling Marlin	Ellington Racing	Chevrolet	399	0	running	146	$13,000
8	13	15	Ricky Rudd	Bud Moore Engineering	Ford	399	0	running	142	$18,200
9	10	47	Morgan Shepherd	Race Hill Farm Team	Buick	399	12	running	143	$14,450
10	9	27	Rusty Wallace	Blue Max Racing	Pontiac	398	5	running	139	$16,750
11	16	44	Terry Labonte	Hagan Enterprises	Oldsmobile	398	0	running	130	$14,800
12	18	22	Bobby Allison	Stavola Brothers Racing	Buick	398	1	running	132	$14,200
13	11	12	Neil Bonnett	Junior Johnson & Associates	Chevrolet	397	2	running	129	$15,400
14	19	4	Lake Speed	Morgan–McClure Motorsports	Oldsmobile	397	6	running	126	$6,400
15	22	8	Bobby Hillin Jr.	Stavola Brothers Racing	Buick	396	0	running	118	$10,795
16	41	71	Dave Marcis	Marcis Auto Racing	Ford	395	0	running	115	$9,825
17	30	88	Buddy Baker	Baker–Schiff Racing	Oldsmobile	395	0	running	112	$5,300
18	32	2	Brett Bodine	Hendrick Motorsports	Chevrolet	394	0	running	109	$10,100
19	31	98	Ron Bouchard	Curb Racing	Pontiac	394	0	running	106	$4,900
20	17	7	Kyle Petty	Wood Brothers Racing	Ford	394	0	running	103	$12,150
21	24	75	Jody Ridley	RahMoc Enterprises	Pontiac	392	0	running	100	$8,315
22	14	02	Mark Martin	Gunderman Racing	Ford	391	0	running	97	$4,200
23	27	90	Ken Schrader	Donlavey Racing	Ford	391	0	running	94	$8,705
24	20	66	Phil Parsons	Jackson Bros. Motorsports	Oldsmobile	389	0	running	91	$3,500
25	39	94	Trevor Boys	Eller Racing	Pontiac	389	0	running	88	$2,800
26	34	23	Michael Waltrip (R)	Bahari Racing	Pontiac	389	0	running	85	$3,850
27	29	35	Alan Kulwicki (R)	AK Racing	Ford	382	0	running	82	$2,500
28	21	51	Connie Saylor	Spohn Racing	Ford	376	0	running	0	$2,200
29	38	32	Eddie Bierschwale	Ingle Racing	Chevrolet	374	1	running	81	$2,000
30	35	79	Derrike Cope	Razore Racing	Ford	361	0	running	73	$1,900
31	1	5	Geoff Bodine	Hendrick Motorsports	Chevrolet	319	2	camshaft	75	$33,850
32	23	26	Joe Ruttman	King Racing	Buick	292	0	running	67	$5,635
33	33	17	Doug Heveron	Hamby Racing	Chevrolet	278	0	engine	64	$5,475
34	6	55	Benny Parsons	Jackson Bros. Motorsports	Oldsmobile	198	1	shocks	66	$2,200
35	40	18	Tommy Ellis	Freedlander Motorsports	Chevrolet	172	1	overheating	63	$1,650
36	7	21	David Pearson	Pearson Racing	Chevrolet	138	0	head gasket	0	$1,800
37	28	81	Chet Fillip (R)	Fillip Racing	Ford	124	0	accident	52	$1,575
38	37	6	Richard Petty	U.S. Racing	Chevrolet	123	0	engine	49	$5,465
39	25	10	Greg Sacks	DiGard Motorsports	Chevrolet	73	0	accident	46	$1,525
40	26	99	Brad Teague	Ball Motorsports	Chevrolet	37	0	accident	43	$1,500
41	36	45	Ken Ragan	Morris Racing	Pontiac	5	0	accident	40	$1,500
Failed to qualify or withdrew
42		67	Buddy Arrington	Arrington Racing	Ford					
43		52	Jimmy Means	Jimmy Means Racing	Pontiac					
44		30	Willy T. Ribbs	DiGard Motorsports	Chevrolet					
45		70	J. D. McDuffie	McDuffie Racing	Pontiac					
WD		43	Richard Petty	Petty Enterprises	Pontiac					
Official race results

== Standings after the race ==
Drivers' Championship standings

	Pos	Driver	Points
	1	Dale Earnhardt	1,767
	2	Darrell Waltrip	1,623 (-144)
1	3	Bobby Allison	1,505 (-262)
1	4	Terry Labonte	1,447 (–320)
2	5	Rusty Wallace	1,440 (–327)
1	6	Bill Elliott	1,436 (–331)
2	7	Harry Gant	1,380 (–387)
3	8	Tim Richmond	1,377 (–390)
1	9	Kyle Petty	1,361 (–406)
	10	Ricky Rudd	1,344 (–423)
Official driver's standings

- Note: Only the first 10 positions are included for the driver standings.

== Notes ==
Previous race: 1986 Budweiser 500	NASCAR Winston Cup Series; 1986 season	Next race: 1986 Budweiser 400
