= 1986 NASCAR Winston Cup Series =

American motorsport season

Seasons
- ← 1985 1987 →

The 1986 NASCAR Winston Cup Series was the 38th season of professional stock car racing in the United States and the 15th modern-era Cup series season. The season began on February 16 and ended November 16. Dale Earnhardt of RCR Enterprises won his second championship this year.

== 1986 NASCAR Winston Cup Series drivers ==
=== Complete schedule ===
Manufacturer	Team	No.	Driver	Crew Chief
Buick	King Racing	26	Joe Ruttman	Larry McReynolds
Buick	Stavola Brothers Racing	22	Bobby Allison	Bobby Hudson
Chevrolet	Hylton Motorsports	48	Ron Esau 3	
Chevrolet	Hylton Motorsports	48	Eddie Bierschwale 1	
Chevrolet	Hylton Motorsports	48	Wayne Slark 1	
Chevrolet	Hylton Motorsports	48	James Hylton 8	
Chevrolet	Hylton Motorsports	48	Ronnie Thomas 5	
Chevrolet	Hylton Motorsports	48	Morgan Shepherd 1	
Chevrolet	Hylton Motorsports	48	Jerry Cranmer 5	
Chevrolet	Hylton Motorsports	48	Johnny Coy Jr. 2	
Chevrolet	Hylton Motorsports	48	Trevor Boys 1	
Chevrolet	Hylton Motorsports	48	Ken Ragan 2	
Chevrolet	Hendrick Motorsports	5	Geoff Bodine	Gary Nelson
Chevrolet	Hendrick Motorsports	25	Tim Richmond	Harry Hyde
Chevrolet	Junior Johnson & Associates	11	Darrell Waltrip	Jeff Hammond
Chevrolet	Junior Johnson & Associates	12	Neil Bonnett 28	Tim Brewer
Chevrolet	Junior Johnson & Associates	12	Davey Allison 1	Tim Brewer
Chevrolet	Mach 1 Racing	33	Harry Gant	Travis Carter
Chevrolet	Marcis Auto Racing	71	Dave Marcis	
Chevrolet	Richard Childress Racing	3	Dale Earnhardt	Kirk Shelmerdine
Ford	Arrington Racing	67	Buddy Arrington 28	Joey Arrington
Ford	Arrington Racing	67	Rick Baldwin 1	Joey Arrington
Ford	Bud Moore Engineering	15	Ricky Rudd	Bud Moore
Ford	Donlavey Racing	90	Ken Schrader	Junie Donlavey
Ford	Melling Racing	9	Bill Elliott	Ernie Elliott
Ford	Wood Brothers Racing	7	Kyle Petty	Eddie Wood
Oldsmobile	Hagan Racing	44	Terry Labonte	Steve Hmiel
Pontiac	Blue Max Racing	27	Rusty Wallace	Barry Dodson
Pontiac	Petty Enterprises	43	Richard Petty	Dale Inman
Pontiac	RahMoc Enterprises	75	Lake Speed 4	Robin Pemberton
Pontiac	RahMoc Enterprises	75	Jody Ridley 10	Robin Pemberton
Pontiac	RahMoc Enterprises	75	Morgan Shepherd 11	Robin Pemberton
Pontiac	RahMoc Enterprises	75	Jim Sauter 4	Robin Pemberton
Chevrolet 1 Buick 28	Stavola Brothers Racing	8	Bobby Hillin Jr.	Ron Puryear
Chevrolet 19 Oldsmobile 10	Hamby Motorsports	17	Doug Heveron 10	
Chevrolet 19 Oldsmobile 10	Hamby Motorsports	17	Phil Parsons 2	
Chevrolet 19 Oldsmobile 10	Hamby Motorsports	17	Pancho Carter 6	
Chevrolet 19 Oldsmobile 10	Hamby Motorsports	17	Jim Hull 1	
Chevrolet 19 Oldsmobile 10	Hamby Motorsports	17	Eddie Bierschwale 10	
Pontiac 28 Buick 1	Bahari Racing	23	Michael Waltrip (R)	
Pontiac 28 Chevrolet 1	Means Racing	52	Jimmy Means	

=== Limited schedule ===
Manufacturer	Team	No.	Driver	Crew Chief	Round(s)
Chevrolet	Ellington Racing	1	Sterling Marlin		10
Chevrolet	Freelander Motorsports	18	Tommy Ellis	Buddy Parrott	24
Chevrolet	Gray Racing	54	Eddie Bierschwale		5
Chevrolet	Gray Racing	54	Donnie Allison		1
Chevrolet	Jackson Brothers Motorsports	55	Benny Parsons	Cliff Champion	16
Chevrolet	Jackson Brothers Motorsports	66	Phil Parsons	Marv Acton	15
Ford	Bill Terry	32	Alan Kulwicki (R)	Mike Beat	3
Ford	Bill Terry	35	Alan Kulwicki (R)	Mike Beat	14
Ford	AK Racing	35	Alan Kulwicki (R)	Mike Beat	9
Ford	Circle Bar Racing	81	Chet Fillip (R)		17
Ford	Langley Racing	64	Pancho Carter	Elmo Langley	3
Ford	Langley Racing	64	Doug Heveron	Elmo Langley	1
Ford	Langley Racing	64	Morgan Shepherd	Elmo Langley	1
Ford	Langley Racing	64	Connie Saylor	Elmo Langley	7
Ford	Langley Racing	64	Rick Baldwin	Elmo Langley	3
Ford	Langley Racing	64	Jimmy Hensley	Elmo Langley	3
Ford	Langley Racing	64	Tommy Gale	Elmo Langley	1
Ford	Langley Racing	64	Eddie Bierschwale	Elmo Langley	5
Ford	Langley Racing	64	Bryan Baker	Elmo Langley	1
Ford	Langley Racing	64	Mike Potter	Elmo Langley	1
Ford	Langley Racing	64	Rick McCray	Elmo Langley	1
Ford	RahMoc Enterprises	57	Jody Ridley		2
Ford	Ranier-Lundy Racing	28	Cale Yarborough	Joey Knuckles	16
Oldsmobile	Baker-Schiff Racing	88	Buddy Baker	Doug Richert	17
Oldsmobile	Baker-Schiff Racing	88	Al Unser	Doug Richert	1
Pontiac	C & M Motorsports	60	Cliff Hucul		4
Pontiac	C & M Motorsports	94	Eddie Bierschwale		7
Pontiac	C & M Motorsports	94	Morgan Shepherd		1
Pontiac	C & M Motorsports	94	Doug Heveron		1
Pontiac	C & M Motorsports	94	Trevor Boys		3
Pontiac	Cliff Stewart Racing	2	Kirk Bryant	Darrell Bryant	4
Pontiac	Curb Racing	98	Ron Bouchard	Mike Beam	17
Pontiac	Curb Racing	98	Dale Jarrett	Mike Beam	1
Pontiac	McDuffie Racing	70	J. D. McDuffie	Jeff McDuffie	20
Pontiac	Winkle Motorsports	70	J. D. McDuffie	Jeff McDuffie	7
Chevrolet 1 Buick 12	Race Hill Farm Team	47	Morgan Shepherd	Jake Elder	13
Chevrolet 5 Buick 1	Sadler Brothers Racing	95	Davey Allison	Tom Pistone	6
Chevrolet 23 Buick 1	U.S. Racing	6	Trevor Boys		9
Chevrolet 23 Buick 1	U.S. Racing	6	Joe Booher		2
Chevrolet 23 Buick 1	U.S. Racing	6	Richard Petty		1
Chevrolet 23 Buick 1	U.S. Racing	6	D.K. Ulrich		10
Chevrolet 23 Buick 1	U.S. Racing	6	Jim Sauter		1
Chevrolet 23 Buick 1	U.S. Racing	6	Rick Knoop		1
Oldsmobile 17 Chevrolet 1	Morgan-McClure Motorsports	4	Rick Wilson	Tony Glover	17
Oldsmobile 17 Chevrolet 1	Morgan-McClure Motorsports	4	Lake Speed	Tony Glover	1

== Schedule ==
No.	Race title	Track	Date
	Busch Clash	Daytona International Speedway, Daytona Beach	February 9
	7-Eleven Twin 125's	Daytona International Speedway, Daytona Beach	February 13
1	Daytona 500	Daytona International Speedway, Daytona Beach	February 16
2	Miller High Life 400	Richmond Fairgrounds Raceway, Richmond	February 23
3	Goodwrench 500	North Carolina Motor Speedway, Rockingham	March 2
4	Motorcraft 500	Atlanta International Raceway, Hampton	March 16
5	Valleydale 500	Bristol International Raceway, Bristol	April 6
6	TranSouth 500	Darlington Raceway, Darlington	April 13
7	First Union 400	North Wilkesboro Speedway, North Wilkesboro	April 20
8	Sovran Bank 500	Martinsville Speedway, Ridgeway	April 27
9	Winston 500	Alabama International Motor Speedway, Talladega	May 4
	Atlanta Invitational	Atlanta International Raceway, Hampton	May 11
	The Winston	Atlanta International Raceway, Hampton	May 11
10	Budweiser 500	Dover Downs International Speedway, Dover	May 18
11	Coca-Cola 600	Charlotte Motor Speedway, Concord	May 25
12	Budweiser 400	Riverside International Raceway, Riverside	June 1
13	Miller High Life 500	Pocono International Raceway, Long Pond	June 8
14	Miller American 400	Michigan International Speedway, Brooklyn	June 15
15	Firecracker 400	Daytona International Speedway, Daytona Beach	July 4
16	Summer 500	Pocono International Raceway, Long Pond	July 20
17	Talladega 500	Alabama International Motor Speedway, Talladega	July 27
18	Budweiser at The Glen	Watkins Glen International, Watkins Glen	August 10
19	Champion Spark Plug 400	Michigan International Speedway, Brooklyn	August 17
20	Busch 500	Bristol International Raceway, Bristol	August 23
21	Southern 500	Darlington Raceway, Darlington	August 31
22	Wrangler Jeans Indigo 400	Richmond Fairgrounds Raceway, Richmond	September 7
23	Delaware 500	Dover Downs International Speedway, Dover	September 14
24	Goody's 500	Martinsville Speedway, Ridgeway	September 21
25	Holly Farms 400	North Wilkesboro Speedway, North Wilkesboro	September 28
26	Oakwood Homes 500	Charlotte Motor Speedway, Concord	October 5
27	Nationwise 500	North Carolina Motor Speedway, Rockingham	October 19
28	Atlanta Journal 500	Atlanta International Raceway, Hampton	November 2
29	Winston Western 500	Riverside International Raceway, Riverside	November 16

== Races ==
No.	Race	Pole position	Most laps led	Winning driver	Manufacturer
	Busch Clash	Harry Gant	Dale Earnhardt	Dale Earnhardt	Chevrolet
	7-Eleven 125 #1	Bill Elliott	Unknown	Bill Elliott	Ford
	7-Eleven 125 #2	Geoff Bodine	Dale Earnhardt	Dale Earnhardt	Chevrolet
1	Daytona 500	Bill Elliott	Geoff Bodine	Geoff Bodine	Chevrolet
2	Miller High Life 400	Geoff Bodine	Dale Earnhardt	Kyle Petty	Ford
3	Goodwrench 500	Terry Labonte	Terry Labonte	Terry Labonte	Oldsmobile
4	Motorcraft 500	Dale Earnhardt	Dale Earnhardt	Morgan Shepherd	Buick
5	Valleydale 500	Geoff Bodine	Rusty Wallace	Rusty Wallace	Pontiac
6	TranSouth 500	Geoff Bodine	Dale Earnhardt	Dale Earnhardt	Chevrolet
7	First Union 400	Geoff Bodine	Dale Earnhardt	Dale Earnhardt	Chevrolet
8	Sovran Bank 500	Tim Richmond	Ricky Rudd	Ricky Rudd	Ford
9	Winston 500	Bill Elliott	Bill Elliott	Bobby Allison	Buick
	Atlanta Invitational	Kyle Petty	Tim Richmond	Benny Parsons	Oldsmobile
	The Winston	Darrell Waltrip	Bill Elliott	Bill Elliott	Ford
10	Budweiser 500	Ricky Rudd	Harry Gant	Geoff Bodine	Chevrolet
11	Coca-Cola 600	Geoff Bodine	Cale Yarborough; Bill Elliott	Dale Earnhardt	Chevrolet
12	Budweiser 400	Darrell Waltrip	Tim Richmond	Darrell Waltrip	Chevrolet
13	Miller High Life 500	Geoff Bodine	Tim Richmond	Tim Richmond	Chevrolet
14	Miller American 400	Tim Richmond	Harry Gant	Bill Elliott	Ford
15	Firecracker 400	Cale Yarborough	Dale Earnhardt	Tim Richmond	Chevrolet
16	Summer 500	Harry Gant	Geoff Bodine	Tim Richmond	Chevrolet
17	Talladega 500	Bill Elliott	Dale Earnhardt	Bobby Hillin Jr.	Buick
18	Budweiser at The Glen	Tim Richmond	Geoff Bodine	Tim RIchmond	Chevrolet
19	Champion Spark Plug 400	Benny Parsons	Bill Elliott	Bill Elliott	Ford
20	Busch 500	Geoff Bodine	Darrell Waltrip	Darrell Waltrip	Chevrolet
21	Southern 500	Tim Richmond	Tim Richmond	Tim Richmond	Chevrolet
22	Wrangler Jeans Indigo 400	Harry Gant	Ricky Rudd	Tim Richmond	Chevrolet
23	Delaware 500	Geoff Bodine	Ricky Rudd	Ricky Rudd	Ford
24	Goody's 500	Geoff Bodine	Geoff Bodine	Rusty Wallace	Pontiac
25	Holly Farms 400	Tim Richmond	Geoff Bodine	Darrell Waltrip	Chevrolet
26	Oakwood Homes 500	Tim Richmond	Tim Richmond	Dale Earnhardt	Chevrolet
27	Nationwise 500	Tim Richmond	Morgan Shepherd	Neil Bonnett	Chevrolet
28	Atlanta Journal 500	Bill Elliott	Dale Earnhardt	Dale Earnhardt	Chevrolet
29	Winston Western 500	Tim Richmond	Geoff Bodine	Tim Richmond	Chevrolet

=== Busch Clash ===
The 8th annual Busch Clash was held on February 9 at Daytona International Speedway. Harry Gant drew for the pole. Only eight drivers ran.

Full Results

Finish	Grid	Car no.	Driver	Car Make	Laps	Status	Laps Led
1	4	3	Dale Earnhardt	Chevrolet Monte Carlo	20	0:15:19	15
2	6	9	Bill Elliott	Ford Thunderbird	20	-2 car lengths	
3	2	12	Neil Bonnett	Chevrolet Monte Carlo	20	Flagged	5
4	7	5	Geoff Bodine	Chevrolet Monte Carlo	20	Flagged	
5	8	44	Terry Labonte	Oldsmobile Delta 88	20	Flagged	
6	3	27	Rusty Wallace	Pontiac Grand Prix 2+2	20	Flagged	
7	1	33	Harry Gant	Chevrolet Monte Carlo	20	Flagged	
8	5	11	Darrell Waltrip	Chevrolet Monte Carlo	20	Flagged	

Average speed: 195.865 mph

Caution flags (caution flag laps do not count in this race)
From Lap	To Lap	Reason
6	6	#5 Bodine spin, turn 4

Lap Leader Breakdown
From Lap	To Lap	Total Laps	Driver
1	5	5	Neil Bonnett
6	20	15	Dale Earnhardt

=== 7-Eleven Twin 125's ===
The 7-Eleven Twin 125's, a pair of qualifying races for the Daytona 500, were held February 13 at Daytona International Speedway. Bill Elliott and Geoff Bodine won the poles for both races, respectively.

Race One Top Ten Results

1. 9-Bill Elliott
2. 22-Bobby Allison
3. 44-Terry Labonte
4. 7-Kyle Petty
5. 1-Sterling Marlin
6. 43-Richard Petty
7. 12-Neil Bonnett
8. 98-Ron Bouchard
9. 4-Rick Wilson
10. 66-Phil Parsons

Race Two Top Ten Results

1. 3-Dale Earnhardt
2. 5-Geoff Bodine
3. 11-Darrell Waltrip
4. 47-Morgan Shepherd
5. 27-Rusty Wallace
6. 71-Dave Marcis
7. 28-Cale Yarborough
8. 33-Harry Gant
9. 88-Buddy Baker
10. 6-Trevor Boys

=== Daytona 500 ===
Top Ten Results

1. 5-Geoff Bodine
2. 44-Terry Labonte
3. 11-Darrell Waltrip
4. 8-Bobby Hillin Jr.
5. 55-Benny Parsons -1 lap
6. 98-Ron Bouchard -1 lap
7. 4-Rick Wilson -1 lap
8. 27-Rusty Wallace -1 lap
9. 1-Sterling Marlin -2 laps
10. 75-Lake Speed -2 laps
- In what would be the first of a string of Daytona 500 heartbreakers for Dale Earnhardt; Earnhardt ran out of fuel with three laps to go and coasted into pit road for gas, only to blow his engine when restarting it; resulting in a 14th place finish.

=== Miller High Life 400 ===
The Miller High Life 400 was held February 23 at Richmond Fairgrounds Raceway. Geoff Bodine won the pole.

Top Ten Results

1. 7-Kyle Petty*
2. 26-Joe Ruttman
3. 3-Dale Earnhardt
4. 22-Bobby Allison -1 lap
5. 11-Darrell Waltrip -2 laps
6. 8-Bobby Hillin Jr. -2 laps
7. 12-Neil Bonnett -2 laps
8. 5-Geoff Bodine -3 laps
9. 71-Dave Marcis -3 laps
10. 27-Rusty Wallace -5 laps
- This was Kyle Petty's first career Winston Cup Series victory.
- The race is widely considered one of the most controversial finishes in NASCAR history. Darrell Waltrip and Dale Earnhardt battled for the better part of the race. In the final five laps, Waltrip rode on the back bumper of Earnhardt, bumping and rubbing the whole way. With three laps to go, Waltrip finally got a nose underneath Earnhardt exiting turn two. But Waltrip did not fully clear Earnhardt down the backstretch. Going into turn 3, Earnhardt spun Waltrip out, but lost control himself and both cars crashed hard into outside guardrail. The wreck collected Joe Ruttman (3rd place) and Geoff Bodine (4th place), allowing 5th place Kyle Petty to slip by and take his first-career Cup victory in improbable fashion. The incident drew a fine for Earnhardt, raised tempers throughout the garage area, and earned Earnhardt the "Ironhead" nickname. The incident was dramatized in the movie 3.
- With his victory, Kyle Petty became NASCAR's first third generation winner.
- In the 1990 film Days of Thunder, a clip of the incident between Earnhardt and Waltrip appears on the TV set that Cole Trickle and Harry Hogge are watching in the scene where they are riding in a transporter.
- Terry Labonte, thinking his engine had failed, pulled his #44 Piedmont Airlines Oldsmobile behind the wall. However, a crew member noticed some metal interfering with the ignition, and once the obstruction was cleared, the engine refired, allowing Labonte to return to the race and finish in 15th place.
- Early in the race, Earnhardt could be seen steering his car while simultaneously wiping dirt off his windshield.

=== Goodwrench 500 ===
The Goodwrench 500 was held March 2 at North Carolina Motor Speedway. Terry Labonte won the pole.

Top Ten Results

1. 44-Terry Labonte
2. 33-Harry Gant
3. 43-Richard Petty
4. 47-Morgan Shepherd -1 lap
5. 11-Darrell Waltrip -1 lap
6. 28-Cale Yarborough -2 laps
7. 9-Bill Elliott -2 laps
8. 3-Dale Earnhardt -2 laps
9. 12-Neil Bonnett -2 laps
10. 75-Lake Speed -3 laps
- The win proved to be Labonte's last with Billy Hagan.
- This was the only points paying win for the Oldsmobile Delta 88 in the Winston Cup Series.

=== Motorcraft 500 ===
The Motorcraft 500 was held March 16 at Atlanta International Raceway. Dale Earnhardt won the pole.

Top Ten Results

1. 47-Morgan Shepherd
2. 3-Dale Earnhardt
3. 44-Terry Labonte
4. 11-Darrell Waltrip
5. 9-Bill Elliott
6. 55-Benny Parsons
7. 25-Tim Richmond
8. 27-Rusty Wallace -1 lap
9. 22-Bobby Allison -1 lap
10. 5-Geoff Bodine -1 lap
- This was Morgan Shepherd's 1st victory since 1981.

=== Valleydale 500 ===
The Valleydale 500 was held April 6 at Bristol International Raceway. The No. 5 of Geoff Bodine won the pole.

Top Ten Results

1. 27-Rusty Wallace*
2. 15-Ricky Rudd
3. 11-Darrell Waltrip
4. 33-Harry Gant -1 lap
5. 9-Bill Elliott -1 lap
6. 22-Bobby Allison -1 lap
7. 44-Terry Labonte -2 laps
8. 25-Tim Richmond -2 laps
9. 7-Kyle Petty -3 laps
10. 3-Dale Earnhardt -3 laps
- This was Rusty Wallace's 1st career Winston Cup victory.
- This was also the 1st victory for the Pontiac Grand Prix 2+2.

=== TranSouth 500 ===
The TranSouth 500 was held April 13 at Darlington Raceway. The No. 5 of Geoff Bodine won the pole.

Top Ten Results

1. 3-Dale Earnhardt
2. 11-Darrell Waltrip
3. 22-Bobby Allison -1 lap
4. 12-Neil Bonnett -1 lap
5. 25-Tim Richmond -3 laps
6. 27-Rusty Wallace -3 laps
7. 43-Richard Petty -3 laps
8. 9-Bill Elliott -5 laps
9. 7-Kyle Petty -6 laps
10. 90-Ken Schrader -11 laps

=== First Union 400 ===
The First Union 400 was held April 20 at North Wilkesboro Speedway. Geoff Bodine won the pole.

Top Ten Results

1. 3-Dale Earnhardt
2. 15-Ricky Rudd
3. 5-Geoff Bodine
4. 11-Darrell Waltrip
5. 26-Joe Ruttman
6. 22-Bobby Allison
7. 33-Harry Gant
8. 7-Kyle Petty
9. 9-Bill Elliott
10. 27-Rusty Wallace -1 lap
- This race marked the 1st career Winston Cup start for Willy T. Ribbs, best known for being the 1st African-American to start the Indianapolis 500 in 1991. Ribbs struggled during the race, spinning out twice on his way to a 22nd-place finish, 13 laps down.
- The No. 6 of Trevor Boys smacked the wall in Turn 3 on lap 89 and came to a stop at the entrance of pit road, blocking it. Instead of throwing a caution, the tow truck was sent out to tow the D. K. Ulrich-owned car to his pit stall/hauler (until the September 1988 event at the track, race team haulers were literally parked right behind their chosen pit stall) while the rest of the cars continued around the track at full speed.
- This race included two caution periods around halfway due to rain. However, the race was not red-flagged either time the caution was thrown for the rain showers.

=== Sovran Bank 500 ===
The Sovran Bank 500 was held April 27 at Martinsville Speedway. No. 25 of Tim Richmond won the pole.

Top Ten Results

1. 15-Ricky Rudd*
2. 26-Joe Ruttman -1 lap
3. 44-Terry Labonte -4 laps
4. 35-Alan Kulwicki (R) -4 laps
5. 7-Kyle Petty -4 laps
6. 8-Bobby Hillin Jr. -5 laps
7. 90-Ken Schrader -7 laps
8. 22-Bobby Allison -8 laps
9. 79-Derrike Cope (R) -11 laps
10. 75-Jody Ridley -13 laps
- Ricky Rudd's official margin of victory in the race was 1 lap, and an additional 6 seconds.
- According to Bill Elliott's book, Awesome Bill From Dawsonville, Elliott suffered his first engine failure in 3 years in this race.
- This race marked the first career Winston Cup start for Mike Skinner. Skinner finished 22nd, 156 laps behind.
- First career top 5 for Alan Kulwicki.

=== Winston 500 ===
The Winston 500 was held May 4 at Alabama International Motor Speedway. The No. 9 of Bill Elliott won the pole.

Top Ten Results

1. 22-Bobby Allison
2. 3-Dale Earnhardt
3. 88-Buddy Baker
4. 8-Bobby Hillin Jr.
5. 55-Phil Parsons
6. 47-Morgan Shepherd
7. 43-Richard Petty
8. 4-Rick Wilson
9. 98-Ron Bouchard
10. 10-Greg Sacks

Failed to qualify: 35-Alan Kulwicki (R), 60-Dick Skillen, 70-J. D. McDuffie, 77-Ken Ragan, 95-Davey Allison, 02-Mark Martin, Steve Moore

- This race is most notable for a pre-race incident involving a drunken fan who stole the pace car before the race started and drove a lap around the track. Local Sheriff's Deputies and track workers quickly set up a road block at the exit of Turn 4. When the fan stopped the Pontiac Firebird, the sheriffs opened the door, pulled the driver out and detained him.
- The whole field qualified over 200 miles per hour with several upcoming stars failing to qualify.
- Bill Elliott led a race-high 116 laps. Elliott had the dominant car all day, but finished 24th after his engine blew while leading with 14 laps remaining.

=== The Winston ===
The second edition of the NASCAR All-Star Race (then known as The Winston; the name used since 2008 is now a retronym to comply with Tobacco Master Settlement Agreement regulations in effect), an all-star event for the previous season's race winners, was held at Atlanta International Raceway on Sunday May 11 (Mother's Day). The pole position was awarded to Darrell Waltrip as the defending Winston Cup champion.

Top Ten Results

1. 9-Bill Elliott
2. 3-Dale Earnhardt
3. 33-Harry Gant
4. 11-Darrell Waltrip
5. 28-Cale Yarborough
6. 12-Neil Bonnett
7. 5-Geoff Bodine
8. 15-Ricky Rudd
9. 44-Terry Labonte
10. 10-Greg Sacks
- This was the only time the All-Star Race was held at Atlanta, and featured a 200-kilometer (83 lap) format, with a mandatory green flag pit stop. Because there were only nine race winners in 1985, the highest placed non-winner from the 1985 point standings (Geoff Bodine) was added to the field to make it an even ten cars.
- Bill Elliott led 82 of the 83 en route to a dominating victory. Elliott collected the $200,000 first place prize, plus $40,000 in additional cash bonuses for leading laps 20, 30, 50, and 60.
- A consolation race for non-winners from 1985, the Atlanta Invitational (now known as the All-Star Open), was added to the weekend's events. Benny Parsons won the 100-lap/152.2 mile race, his last NASCAR-sanctioned victory. The win gave Parsons a free spot in the next year's All-Star Race. In subsequent years, the winner of the All-Star Open advances to the All-Star Race, followed by a few years where the number of cars advancing to the All-Star Race were designed to ensure the field reaches 20 cars. Since 2023, the top two drivers in the All-Star Open and a fan vote winner (added in 2004) advance to the feature.
- A lackluster crowd of only 18,500 attended the event, and only 23 cars entered (10 in the All-Star Race, 13 in the Open). However, the all-star format of having a non-winners' "last chance" race followed by a main event would become a permanent fixture of all-star weekend.
- Originally, R. J. Reynolds intended the race to rotate to different tracks each year. This was the second and last year of that format. Rather that rotate each year, for 1987 it was moved back to Charlotte where it remained through 2019. The All-Star Race moved to Bristol in 2020 because of NASCAR's compacted schedule and North Carolina's ban on spectator events at the time, it was then held in Fort Worth, Texas for both 2021 and 2022. It was then moved to North Wilkesboro for 2023 through 2025. The 2026 edition moved yet again to Dover Motor Speedway, then for 2027 the race is currently scheduled to move back to North Wilkesboro.

=== Budweiser 500 ===
The Budweiser 500 was held May 18 at Dover International Speedway. Ricky Rudd won the pole.

Top Ten Results

1. 5-Geoff Bodine
2. 22-Bobby Allison
3. 3-Dale Earnhardt -1 lap
4. 15-Ricky Rudd -2 laps
5. 11-Darrell Waltrip -2 laps
6. 43-Richard Petty -6 laps
7. 9-Bill Elliott -7 laps
8. 8-Bobby Hillin Jr. -7 laps
9. 18-Tommy Ellis -7 laps
10. 90-Ken Schrader -7 laps

=== Coca-Cola 600 ===
The Coca-Cola 600 was held May 25 at Charlotte Motor Speedway. The No. 5 of Geoff Bodine won the pole.

Top Ten Results

1. 3-Dale Earnhardt
2. 25-Tim Richmond
3. 28-Cale Yarborough
4. 33-Harry Gant
5. 11-Darrell Waltrip
6. 9-Bill Elliott
7. 1-Sterling Marlin -1 lap
8. 15-Ricky Rudd -1 lap
9. 47-Morgan Shepherd -1 lap
10. 27-Rusty Wallace -2 laps
- Richard Petty was not allowed to bring out a backup car after crashing his #43 Pontiac in practice. As a result, Petty Enterprises bought the lime green-and-white #6 Chevrolet of D.K. Ulrich, and raced that car. Petty finished 38th as a result of a blown engine after completing 123 laps.
- This was the 1st career Winston Cup start for Brett Bodine, who drove a Hendrick Motorsports #2 Chevrolet to an 18th-place finish, 6 laps down.
- This race insured there would be no Winston Million winner in 1986. The bonus for winning 2 out of 4 races was still alive for the Southern 500 later in the season.
- After this race, Dale Earnhardt would not take the checkered flag first again until returning to Charlotte Motor Speedway for the Oakwood Homes 500 on October 5.

=== Budweiser 400 ===
The Budweiser 400 was held on June 1 at Riverside International Raceway. Darrell Waltrip won the pole.

Top Ten Results

1. 11-Darrell Waltrip
2. 25-Tim Richmond
3. 15-Ricky Rudd
4. 27-Rusty Wallace
5. 3-Dale Earnhardt
6. 43-Richard Petty
7. 22-Bobby Allison
8. 12-Neil Bonnett
9. 33-Harry Gant
10. 18-Glen Steurer -1 lap
- This was the 1st career Winston Cup start for Chad Little, who was then a regular in the Winston West series. Little finished 13th, 3 laps down in the race after starting 25th.
- This was the final time that Darrell Waltrip wins from the pole.

=== Miller High Life 500 ===
The Miller High Life 500 was held June 8 at Pocono International Raceway. Geoff Bodine won the pole.

Top Ten Results

1. 25-Tim Richmond
2. 3-Dale Earnhardt
3. 28-Cale Yarborough
4. 15-Ricky Rudd
5. 9-Bill Elliott
6. 27-Rusty Wallace
7. 26-Joe Ruttman
8. 7-Kyle Petty
9. 5-Geoff Bodine
10. 8-Bobby Hillin Jr. -1 lap
- The race ended under caution when Morgan Shepherd, Harry Gant, and Buddy Arrington were involved in a violent crash with four laps to go in turn one.
- The win was Richmond's first since April 1984, coming after two second-place finishes in the two preceding races, and the first for Harry Hyde since November 1984.

=== Miller American 400 ===
The Miller American 400 was held June 15 at Michigan International Speedway. Tim Richmond won the pole.

Top Ten Results

1. 9-Bill Elliott
2. 33-Harry Gant
3. 5-Geoff Bodine
4. 88-Buddy Baker
5. 11-Darrell Waltrip
6. 3-Dale Earnhardt
7. 8-Bobby Hillin Jr.
8. 4-Rick Wilson
9. 26-Joe Ruttman
10. 15-Ricky Rudd
- This race celebrated Richard Petty's 1,000th career start in the Winston Cup Series, dating back to 1958. Since the race also fell on Father's Day, Petty's daughters Rebecca, Sharron, and Lisa gave the starting command. Petty would finish 13th after falling a lap down early on; a caution came out while he was pitting on lap 45.
- Rick Baldwin, who was scheduled for the ARCA event that weekend, substituted for Buddy Arrington, who had been ruled out from a concussion in the Lap 196 crash the previous week at Pocono. During the first round qualifying session, Baldwin, who drove Arrington's No. 67 Ford Thunderbird that was a former Melling Racing car, spun in Turn 1, with the car hitting the wall flush with the driver's side, knocking him unconscious into a coma from the massive head injuries. In 1992, drivers Ken Schrader and Darrell Waltrip, along with owners Elmo Langley and Richard Childress, testified in court after Baldwin's wife Deborah sued NASCAR over the incident. The drivers testified Baldwin's car was too fast with a chassis setup that was not appropriate for him. Childress testified that Baldwin made chassis adjustments, while Langley (by then a NASCAR official) cautioned Baldwin about the chassis alterations. The jury ruled in NASCAR's favour. The seat mount broke, and Baldwin's head hit the wall (then a common issue with seat safety, which would become at the forefront of later changes), from which he would succumb eleven years later. NASCAR made changes to seat mounting for the 1990 season.

=== Firecracker 400 ===
The Firecracker 400 was held on July 4 at Daytona International Speedway. Cale Yarborough won the pole.

Top Ten Results

1. 25-Tim Richmond
2. 1-Sterling Marlin
3. 8-Bobby Hillin Jr.
4. 11-Darrell Waltrip
5. 7-Kyle Petty
6. 15-Ricky Rudd
7. 26-Joe Ruttman
8. 27-Rusty Wallace
9. 66-Phil Parsons
10. 35-Alan Kulwicki (R)
- Dale Earnhardt blew his engine with 7 laps remaining and spun head-on into the wall after the blown engine dumped oil on his back tires. Attempting to avoid the crash, leader Buddy Baker clipped Connie Saylor's car; damaging Baker's car and providing an opening for Richmond.

=== Summer 500 ===
The Summer 500 was held July 20 at Pocono International Raceway. Harry Gant won the pole.

Top Ten Results

1. 25-Tim Richmond
2. 15-Ricky Rudd
3. 5-Geoff Bodine
4. 11-Darrell Waltrip
5. 22-Bobby Allison
6. 44-Terry Labonte
7. 3-Dale Earnhardt
8. 7-Kyle Petty -1 lap
9. 18-Tommy Ellis -2 laps
10. 4-Rick Wilson -2 laps
- This race was shortened to 150 laps (375 miles) due to a combination of rain, fog and darkness.
- On lap 121, Tim Richmond, racing with Geoff Bodine and Neil Bonnett, spun out and was hit by Richard Petty exiting Turn 2. His car had both front tires flattened and was in a position so that he could not drive it forwards. Richmond backed the car out, then drove it in reverse nearly 1 mile to his pit. At that point, his crew fixed the car so that he could go forward, but only in high gear (4th). He lost a lap but raced with the leaders until Dale Earnhardt crashed around Lap 140; he beat the leaders to the flag and thus got his lap back. With a long rain delay at the start of the race, a NASCAR rule used until July 2024 stated they would race until NASCAR gave the ten laps remaining indicator from the starter. On Lap 141, officials gave the ten laps remaining indicator because of darkness. Richmond pitted for new tires and then charged through the field after the restart; he passed Bodine on the final lap, but Bodine dove back alongside and the two raced through Turn Three; Bodine got loose and Ricky Rudd stormed three abreast; Richmond won in a photo finish. As the 1990 movie Days of Thunder was based on Richmond, this incident was fictionalised in the said movie.

=== Talladega 500 ===
The Talladega 500 was held July 27 at Alabama International Motor Speedway. The No. 9 of Bill Elliott won the pole.

Top Ten Results

1. 8-Bobby Hillin Jr.*
2. 25-Tim Richmond
3. 15-Ricky Rudd*
4. 1-Sterling Marlin
5. 55-Benny Parsons
6. 47-Morgan Shepherd
7. 12-Davey Allison*
8. 26-Joe Ruttman
9. 7-Kyle Petty
10. 22-Bobby Allison -1 lap
- This was Bobby Hillin Jr.'s only career Winston Cup victory.
- The lead changed a season-high 49 times. The race set a motorsports record with 26 leaders, a record broken in 2008.
- Among the race's 26 leaders were Richard Petty, Bill Elliott, Darrell Waltrip, Rodney Combs, Buddy Baker, and Rick Wilson. Cale Yarborough took the lead on the backstretch on lap 107 but Dale Earnhardt beat him to the stripe.
- Ricky Rudd was relieved during the race by Rusty Wallace, who had blown an engine earlier.
- Davey Allison drove the race in place of Neil Bonnett, who was injured in a multi-car wreck at Pocono the previous week; Bonnett worked with CBS Sports as a second color analyst on the telecast of the race.
- Hillin was involved in a five car crash down the backstretch with 25 laps to go when he was drafting race leader Harry Gant; Gant was spun into Phil Parsons and the wreck swept up Darrell Waltrip, Geoff Bodine, and Cale Yarborough.
- Bobby Allison was eliminated while racing Richmond for third; he was hooked by Sterling Marlin and spun into traffic in Turn One; Richmond passed Wallace subbing for Rudd for second while Marlin finished fourth.

=== Budweiser at The Glen ===
The Budweiser at The Glen was held August 10 at Watkins Glen International. Tim Richmond won the pole.

Top Ten Results

1. 25-Tim Richmond
2. 11-Darrell Waltrip
3. 3-Dale Earnhardt
4. 9-Bill Elliott
5. 12-Neil Bonnett
6. 27-Rusty Wallace
7. 15-Ricky Rudd
8. 55-Benny Parsons
9. 7-Kyle Petty
10. 43-Richard Petty

Withdrew: 30-Willy T. Ribbs

- Ribbs withdrew after four engine failures during practice sessions.
- This was the first time a NASCAR race had been run at the track since 1965. However, the 1971 Six Hours configuration was new, as the circuit had moved the pits in the 1971 reconstruction.
- This was Richmond's 4th victory of the season.
- Neil Bonnett returns after sitting out the previous race due to broken ribs. Junior Johnson had Doug Heveron on standby to take over if Bonnett could not run the full race. He would run the full race, running as high as 2nd but eventually settling for 5th.
- Rusty Wallace had to earn his finishing spot the hard way. After taking the lead for three laps from laps 17 to 19, Wallace was black-flagged by NASCAR for leaking oil onto the track. Rejoining the field at the tail-end, Wallace would cut a tire after making contact with the wall, then spun out in turn 5 to bring out a full course caution flag. Despite the setbacks, Wallace would rally to finish 6th.
- Al Unser, Sr. made his first NASCAR start since 1969, driving the #88 Pontiac in place of Buddy Baker. Baker, the car co-owner and regular driver, was the crew chief.

=== Champion Spark Plug 400 ===
The Champion Spark Plug 400 was held August 17 at Michigan International Speedway. The No. 55 of Benny Parsons won the final pole of his hall of fame career.

Top Ten Results

1. 9-Bill Elliott
2. 25-Tim Richmond
3. 11-Darrell Waltrip
4. 5-Geoff Bodine
5. 3-Dale Earnhardt -1 lap
6. 27-Rusty Wallace -1 lap
7. 28-Cale Yarborough -1 lap
8. 33-Harry Gant -1 lap
9. 66-Phil Parsons -1 lap
10. 21-David Pearson* -1 lap
- With this win, Bill Elliott became the 1st driver in NASCAR history to win 4 straight races at one Superspeedway.
- This was David Pearson's last Winston Cup start. He ran as high as 3rd place at one point in the race.
- Buddy Arrington returned to the track where rookie Rick Baldwin, driving Arrington's #67, had suffered injuries that would eventually prove to be fatal in a crash during qualifying for the June event. Arrington would finish 6 laps down in 19th.

=== Busch 500 ===
The Busch 500 was held August 23 at Bristol International Raceway. Geoff Bodine won the pole.

Top Ten Results

1. 11-Darrell Waltrip
2. 44-Terry Labonte
3. 5-Geoff Bodine -1 lap
4. 3-Dale Earnhardt -1 lap
5. 33-Harry Gant -1 lap
6. 25-Tim Richmond -2 laps
7. 43-Richard Petty -3 laps
8. 22-Bobby Allison -4 laps
9. 8-Bobby Hillin Jr. -5 laps
10. 35-Alan Kulwicki (R) -6 laps
- This was the final race for owner of the #35 car Bill Terry. His driver Alan Kulwicki would buy out the team before the next race and be the sports newest owner/driver
- Darrell Waltrip scores his record 10th victory at Bristol.

=== Southern 500 ===
The Southern 500 was held August 31 at Darlington Raceway. Tim Richmond won the pole.

Top Ten Results

1. 25-Tim Richmond
2. 22-Bobby Allison
3. 9-Bill Elliott
4. 47-Morgan Shepherd
5. 11-Darrell Waltrip
6. 15-Ricky Rudd
7. 8-Bobby Hillin Jr.
8. 5-Geoff Bodine
9. 3-Dale Earnhardt -1 lap
10. 28-Cale Yarborough -1 lap
- Geoff Bodine was leading with 14 laps left when Bill Elliott passed him coming off of turn 2 on lap 354. Bodine had slowed down due to running out of fuel and was forced to pit for a splash-and-go. Bodine's engine stalled and the car had to be pushed out, dropping him to the tail end of the lead lap. Elliott stretched his lead to a huge margin, but with 7 laps left, he clipped the outside wall in turn 1. Tim Richmond, who had led a race-high 168 laps, caught Elliott going down the front straightaway and passed him for the lead, winning the race by 2 seconds. It was Richmond's 5th win of the season.
- This race was plagued by rain, to the point of the race running on a damp surface and the drivers having to race as if Darlington Raceway was a dirt track.
- Before this race, rookie Alan Kulwicki bought out his owner Bill Terry and became the owner/driver of the #35 car. He would finish in 12th place, 7 laps down in his first owner/driver outing.
- This race insured no one would win the Winston bonus for winning 2 out of 4 crown jewel races.
- The race was red-flagged for 2 hours and 15 minutes after lap 14 due to a rain shower. Because of the delay, ESPN broke away from its TV coverage of the race on Lap 192 (about 4:30 pm ET) to broadcast the final round of the PGA Tour's St. Jude Classic, as originally scheduled. ESPN provided updates on the race during golf coverage and aired the finish live.

=== Wrangler Jeans Indigo 400 ===
The Wrangler Jeans Indigo 400 was held September 7 at Richmond Fairgrounds Raceway. Harry Gant won the pole.

Top Ten Results

1. 25-Tim Richmond
2. 3-Dale Earnhardt
3. 75-Morgan Shepherd*
4. 43-Richard Petty
5. 12-Neil Bonnett
6. 26-Joe Ruttman
7. 33-Harry Gant
8. 22-Bobby Allison
9. 9-Bill Elliott -1 lap
10. 8-Bobby Hillin Jr. -3 laps
- Morgan Shepherd was hired by RahMoc Enterprises as the driver of the No. 75 Pontiac.
- Tim Richmond had to survive a late race restart because on lap 395 the caution flag flew when Michael Waltrip's entire driveshaft fell out of the car. The race went back under the green flag with 2 laps remaining. Richmond held on by 3 car lengths.
- This was the last Cup Series race to feature less than a 30 car field.

=== Delaware 500 ===
The Delaware 500 was held September 14 at Dover Downs International Speedway. The No. 5 of Geoff Bodine won the pole.

Top Ten Results

1. 15-Ricky Rudd
2. 12-Neil Bonnett
3. 7-Kyle Petty
4. 88-Buddy Baker -1 lap
5. 71-Dave Marcis -2 laps
6. 26-Joe Ruttman -2 laps
7. 35-Alan Kulwicki (R) -3 laps
8. 18-Tommy Ellis -4 laps
9. 8-Bobby Hillin Jr. -5 laps
10. 75-Morgan Shepherd -7 laps
- This was Rudd's 1st win on an oval that was 1 mile in length or longer.

=== Goody's 500 ===
The Goody's 500 was held September 21 at Martinsville Speedway. Geoff Bodine won the pole.

Top Ten Results

1. 27-Rusty Wallace
2. 5-Geoff Bodine
3. 33-Harry Gant
4. 11-Darrell Waltrip -1 lap
5. 26-Joe Ruttman -1 lap
6. 7-Kyle Petty -1 lap
7. 90-Ken Schrader -2 laps
8. 12-Neil Bonnett -3 laps
9. 71-Dave Marcis -3 laps
10. 25-Tim Richmond -4 laps
- This was Pontiac's 2nd & final victory for 1986.

=== Holly Farms 400 ===
The Holly Farms 400 was held September 28 at North Wilkesboro Speedway. The No. 25 of Tim Richmond won the pole.

Top Ten Results

1. 11-Darrell Waltrip
2. 5-Geoff Bodine
3. 43-Richard Petty
4. 27-Rusty Wallace
5. 33-Harry Gant
6. 26-Joe Ruttman -1 lap
7. 15-Ricky Rudd -1 lap
8. 71-Dave Marcis -1 lap
9. 3-Dale Earnhardt -2 laps
10. 44-Terry Labonte -2 laps
- Geoff Bodine had the dominant car leading the most laps (218) but faded late, losing the lead at lap 390 to Darrell Waltrip, he would pull away to a 1.21 second lead for his final victory of 1986.
- The win was also Waltrip's final race victory with Junior Johnson. Waltrip would join Bodine as Hendrick Motorsports teammates in 1987.

=== Oakwood Homes 500 ===
The Oakwood Homes 500 was held on October 5 at Charlotte Motor Speedway. The No. 25 of Tim Richmond won the pole.

Top Ten Results

1. 3-Dale Earnhardt
2. 33-Harry Gant
3. 12-Neil Bonnett -1 lap
4. 15-Ricky Rudd -1 lap
5. 88-Buddy Baker -1 lap
6. 5-Geoff Bodine -1 lap
7. 9-Bill Elliott -1 lap
8. 27-Rusty Wallace -2 laps
9. 11-Darrell Waltrip -2 laps
10. 66-Phil Parsons -3 laps
- Earnhardt had to work hard for this victory as he at one point in the race lost 2 laps due to separate tire issues.
- The pre-race ceremonies saw several members of marching bands pass out from heat exhaustion due to the warmer than normal for late October temperatures, which soared to around the upper 80s.

=== Nationwise 500 ===
The Nationwise 500 was held on October 19 at North Carolina Motor Speedway. The No. 25 of Tim Richmond won the pole.

Top Ten Results

1. 12-Neil Bonnett
2. 15-Ricky Rudd
3. 11-Darrell Waltrip
4. 33-Harry Gant
5. 88-Buddy Baker
6. 3-Dale Earnhardt -1 lap
7. 9-Bill Elliott -1 lap
8. 43-Richard Petty -1 lap
9. 26-Joe Ruttman -2 laps
10. 7-Kyle Petty -3 laps
- The win was Bonnett's last with Junior Johnson, as he was tabbed to drive for RahMoc Enterprises in 1987.

=== Atlanta Journal 500 ===
The Atlanta Journal 500 was held November 2 at Atlanta International Raceway. Bill Elliott won the pole.

Top Ten Results

1. 3-Dale Earnhardt*
2. 43-Richard Petty -1 lap
3. 9-Bill Elliott -1 lap
4. 25-Tim Richmond -1 lap
5. 88-Buddy Baker -1 lap
6. 12-Neil Bonnett -1 lap
7. 7-Kyle Petty -2 laps
8. 44-Terry Labonte -2 laps
9. 26-Joe Ruttman -2 laps
10. 66-Phil Parsons -2 laps
- Dale Earnhardt's official margin of victory was 1 lap and an additional 3 seconds.
- By virtue of Darrell Waltrip blowing an engine to finish 39th and Dale Earnhardt winning the race while leading the most laps, Earnhardt clinched his 2nd Winston Cup Championship.

=== Winston Western 500 ===
The Winston Western 500 was held on November 16 at Riverside International Raceway. Tim Richmond won the pole.

Top Ten Results

1. 25-Tim Richmond
2. 3-Dale Earnhardt
3. 5-Geoff Bodine
4. 11-Darrell Waltrip
5. 26-Joe Ruttman
6. 8-Bobby Hillin Jr.
7. 22-Bobby Allison
8. 27-Rusty Wallace
9. 12-Neil Bonnett -1 lap
10. 44-Terry Labonte -1 lap
- Going into the race, Dale Earnhardt had already clinched the Winston Cup championship. The attention shifted to the battle for second in the championship. Polesitter Tim Richmond needed to finish five positions higher than Darrell Waltrip to move into second. Richmond went on to win the race. However, Waltrip managed 4th place, which secured himself second in the championship, by 6 points over Richmond.
- This was the last race that both Darrell Waltrip and Neil Bonnett drove for Junior Johnson. Waltrip agreed to join Hendrick Motorsports in 1987 as a third car along with Bodine and Richmond, while Bonnett returned to RahMoc Enterprises to pilot the #75 Valvoline Pontiac after having previously driven for them during the 1983 season. Terry Labonte replaced Waltrip in the #11 car while the #12 team was dissolved and would reappear in 1991 as the #22 Maxwell House Ford Thunderbird with then journeyman driver Sterling Marlin behind the wheel.
- This was Al Unser's final NASCAR start. He would devote the rest of his career to CART.
- This marked the final time where Riverside would close the Cup season. Beginning in 1987 and lasting until 2000, the season finale would be at Atlanta Motor Speedway.

== Winston Cup Final Standings ==
(key) Bold – Pole position awarded by time. Italics – Pole position set by final practice results or 1985 Owner's points. * – Most laps led.

Pos.	Driver	DAY	RCH	CAR	ATL	BRI	DAR	NWS	MAR	TAL	DOV	CLT	RIV	POC	MCH	DAY	POC	TAL	GLN	MCH	BRI	DAR	RCH	DOV	MAR	NWS	CLT	CAR	ATL	RIV	Pts
1	Dale Earnhardt	14	3*	8	**2***	10	1*	1*	21	2	3	1	5	2	6	27	7	26*	3	5	4	9	2	21	12	9	1	6	1*	2	4468
2	Darrell Waltrip	3	5	5	4	3	2	4	27	34	5	5	**1**	40	5	4	4	25	2	3	1*	5	29	14	4	1	9	3	39	4	4180
3	Tim Richmond	20	22	16	7	8	5	12	**20**	12	32	2	2	1*	**15**	1	1	2	**1**	2	6	**1***	1	26	10	**11**	**27***	**20**	4	**1**	4174
4	Bill Elliott	**13**	21	7	5	5	8	9	31	**24**	7	6	11	5	1	16	35	**27**	4	1	19	3	9	27	11	16	7	7	**3**	23	3844
5	Ricky Rudd	11	30	28	26	2	26	2	1	36	**4**	8	3	4	10	6	2	3	7	21	23	6	24	1	28	7	4	2	25	19	3823
6	Rusty Wallace	8	10	12	8	1	6	10	30	13	26	10	4	6	19	8	27	35	6	6	14	23	19	13	1	4	8	19	13	8	3762
7	Bobby Allison	42	4	34	9	6	3	6	8	1	2	12	7	13	11	15	5	10	12	24	8	2	8	20	21	22	41	25	16	7	3698
8	Geoff Bodine	1*	**8**	20	10	**24**	**40**	**3**	17	27	1	**31**	39	**9**	3	29	3*	23	19*	4	3	8	13	**28**	**2***	2*	6	32	38	3*	3678
9	Bobby Hillin Jr.	4	6	39	16	28	38	13	6	4	8	15	32	10	7	3	33	1	28	13	9	7	10	9	17	15	26	11	15	6	3546
10	Kyle Petty	16	1	11	28	9	9	8	5	31	19	20	41	8	32	5	8	9	9	28	30	14	20	3	6	14	13	10	7	15	3537
11	Harry Gant	30	28	2	12	4	14	7	25	21	14	4	9	26	2	31	**30**	22	34	8	5	27	**7**	35	3	5	2	4	28	37	3498
12	Terry Labonte	2	15	1	3	7	32	27	3	29	17	11	12	35	12	19	6	38	32	12	2	21	18	19	15	10	15	31	8	10	3473
13	Neil Bonnett	32	7	9	34	30	4	11	26	40	28	13	8	23	25	11	31		5	34	11	24	5	2	8	12	3	1	6	9	3369
14	Richard Petty	36	20	3	11	14	7	29	28	7	6	38	6	19	13	22	34	37	10	18	7	40	4	12	16	3	35	8	2	21	3314
15	Joe Ruttman	28	2	33	42	19	21	5	2	17	11	32	42	7	9	7	38	8	33	30	17	38	6	6	5	6	25	9	9	5	3295
16	Ken Schrader	33	23	22	21	13	10	14	7	26	10	23	17	27	20	12	23	31	16	11	28	36	25	22	7	18	28	14	17	11	3052
17	Dave Marcis	38	9	27	33	27	27	25	16	11	21	16	38	14	37	20	24	36	13	35	15	11	23	5	9	8	11	34	33	12	2912
18	Morgan Shepherd	22		4	1	31	23	19	19	6		9	27	18	29	37	32	6	11	36	22	4	3	10	29	25	32	24*	27	38	2896
19	Michael Waltrip **(R)**	DNQ	25	21	19	32	13	26	11	35	12	26	25	39	22	18	11	14	17	32	13	16	14	16	14	23	19	13	20	31	2853
20	Buddy Arrington	23	14	17	20	17	DNQ	21	15	22	15	DNQ	19	21		25	17	21	24	19	16	20	12	15	19	19	22	17	21	18	2776
21	Alan Kulwicki **(R)**	DNQ	DNQ	15	14	15	11	18	4	DNQ	23	27			16	10	22	32		14	10	12	15	7	13	17	14	12	18	24	2705
22	Jimmy Means	39	11	19	41	DNQ	25	20	12	16	24	DNQ	22	22	DNQ	24	13	15	21	25	27	15	26	24	22	27	18	22	29	17	2495
23	Tommy Ellis	19	24	14	13	11	29		24	32	9	35		15	14	38	9	34		39	12		21	8	26	13	31	35	12		2393
24	Buddy Baker	26			15		30			3		17		36	4	14	36	20		41		19		4			5	5	5	29	1924
25	Eddie Bierschwale	31	31	29	30	29	34	DNQ		30		29		32	27	35	15	39	30	16	18	25	11	25	24	20	24	16	23	DNQ	1860
26	J. D. McDuffie	DNQ	16	31		DNQ	17	28	18	DNQ	20	DNQ	14	16	35	DNQ	19	DNQ	25	31	24	34	28	37	20	26	20	21	DNQ		1825
27	Phil Parsons	24	29	30	18		31			5		24		31	33	9	37	13	14	9		22					10		10		1742
28	Rick Wilson	7			39	12	15			8						21	21	10	11	23	40	26	28		32		29		14	40	1698
29	Cale Yarborough	27		6	27		22			37		3		3	30	**17**	25	24		7		10					36	33	34		1642
30	Benny Parsons	5			6		28			20		34		33	41	36	29	5	8	**26**		31					30		11	27	1555
31	Ron Bouchard	6	18	13	40	25	37	17		9	27	19		12	36	41		17				30					21		42		1553
32	Chet Fillip **(R)**	DNQ			36	22		23		23		37		20	26	40	12	28	22	15	25	35		23		21	38				1433
33	Jody Ridley	12			29	23	20	15	10	42	18	21		11	34	13															1213
34	Trevor Boys	18	26	35	24	18	24	30	14	38	13	25	34													29		37			1064
35	Doug Heveron	15	13		35	21	35	16	29	15	35	33	20			33	16														1052
36	Sterling Marlin	9			32		33			39		7				2		4				37					33		32		989
37	D. K. Ulrich											QL	33	17	40		18			20	20	18	17		27	28					804
38	Pancho Carter	34		23	38					18				28	17	28		40	31												706
39	Ken Ragan	21								DNQ		41				34		18		17							23		19		627
40	Lake Speed	10	17	10	22							14																			608
41	Greg Sacks	35	19	37	25					10		39				39				38											579
42	Ronnie Thomas		DNQ	26		26	36		DNQ	14						DNQ		16		DNQ	DNQ							40			504
43	Bobby Wawak	DNQ		38	23		19					DNQ			24									33			DNQ	29			480
44	Rodney Combs															32		19		29							16		37		421
45	Derrike Cope								9			30	31		28			Wth												41	400
46	James Hylton				DNQ	DNQ						DNQ			38	DNQ			27			39	22								386
47	Davey Allison **(R)**	DNQ	12	25		20	39			DNQ								7													364
48	Mark Martin	37								DNQ		22												11					26	13	364
49	Jim Sauter	25								41					18	23	14	12		37		13									361
50	A. J. Foyt	29			17											42		30									37				355
51	Gary Fedewa										22				23		21			DNQ				34					DNQ		352
52	H. B. Bailey				37		12					DNQ										17					DNQ		41		336
53	Jonathan Lee Edwards **(R)**		DNQ	24		DNQ	DNQ					DNQ		30	DNQ						DNQ	29					DNQ	27			322
54	Jimmy Hensley								23														16		18						318
55	Dick Trickle	17										DNQ								DNQ								15			230
56	Jerry Cranmer **(R)**								13		16			24			26								23						303
57	Bobby Gerhart							DNQ						34			28			22							DNQ		35		295
58	Kirk Bryant	41	27	18	31																						DNQ				301
59	Connie Saylor	DNQ					18			33		28				30		DNQ			DNQ	26					17		30		334
60	Delma Cowart	DNQ			DNQ					19		DNQ						29									39		DNQ		
61	Mike Skinner								22																30			23			264
62	Mark Stahl	DNQ			DNQ		16					DNQ			DNQ							32					DNQ	30	DNQ		255
63	Glen Steurer												10																	16	249
64	Bill Schmitt												18																	14	230
65	Willy T. Ribbs				Wth	DNQ		22				DNQ	29		39				Wth												219
66	Jim Robinson												15																	25	206
67	Mike Potter			DNQ			DNQ				33			DNQ										40				26			192
68	Brad Teague											40				DNQ					21						40				186
69	Rick Newson			40							25			37		DNQ	DNQ														183
70	Chad Little												13																	35	182
71	Joe Booher				DNQ						31									DNQ				18							179
72	Ruben Garcia												30																	22	170
73	Johnny Coy Jr.																							17				36			167
74	Ted Kennedy												23																	30	167
75	Butch Miller					16									21					33											164
76	George Follmer																		18											36	164
77	Hershel McGriff												28																	26	164
78	Mike Laws				DNQ										31														24		161
79	Larry Pearson	40																									12				160
80	Terry Petris												24																	34	152
81	Phil Good																		35						25						146
82	David Pearson											36								10											134
83	Randy Baker																										42		22		134
84	Rick McCray												37																	28	131
85	Jerry Bowman							DNQ			29													36							131
86	Tommie Crozier													DNQ							DNQ			39				28			125
87	John Krebs												26																	42	122
88	Joe Millikan																									30		38			122
89	Tommy Riggins																		15												118
90	David Sosebee				DNQ		DNQ																				34		36		116
91	Cliff Hucul																40			DNQ				31					DNQ		113
92	Charlie Baker																											18			109
93	Brett Bodine											18																			109
94	Jack Ely													25			20														103
95	Rick Knoop																		20												103
96	Jocko Maggiacomo																39		36											DNQ	101
97	Clay Young												21																		100
98	Buddie Boys													38														39			95
99	Jim Hull																			23											94
100	Brent Elliott																									24					91
101	Grant Adcox	DNQ														26		DNQ											DNQ		85
102	Tom Rotsell																		26												85
103	Phil Barkdoll	DNQ								28						DNQ		33													84
104	Ron Shepahrd																						27			DNQ					82
105	David Simko																			27											82
106	Al Unser																		29											20	76
107	Bryan Baker								DNQ															29							76
108	Dale Jarrett																				29										76
109	Randy LaJoie	DNQ												29																	76
110	Howard Rose																							30							73
111	Jeff Swindell																											DNQ	31		70
112	Jim Bown																													32	67
113	Ron Esau	DNQ	QL										16																	33	64
114	Earle Canavan			32		DNQ	DNQ	DNQ																							64
115	Donnie Allison																					33									64
116	Ray Kelly												36																	DNQ	55
117	Howard Mark										36									DNQ									DNQ		55
118	Wayne Slark			36																											55
119	Roy Lee Hendrick																							38							49
120	Jim Fitzgerald																													39	46
121	Tom Bigelow																												40		43
122	Richard Lach												40																		43
123	Rick Baldwin **(R)**							24			34	DNQ			DNQ																
124	Tommy Gale									25																					
125	Jerry Holden			DNQ							30				DNQ																
126	Bill Osborne												35																		
127	Joe Fields										37																				
128	Dick Skillen	DNQ								DNQ																					
129	Clark Dwyer	DNQ										DNQ																			
130	Donny Paul	DNQ										DNQ																			
131	Bob Park	DNQ												DNQ																	
132	Blackie Wangerin	DNQ														DNQ															
133	Ferdin Wallace	DNQ															DNQ														
134	Brad Heath			DNQ																											
135	Steve Moore									DNQ								DNQ													
136	Marta Leonard												DNQ																		
137	St. James Davis												DNQ																	DNQ	
138	Jerry Ward													DNQ																	
139	Don Hume													DNQ																	
140	Harold Marks															DNQ															
141	George Wiltshire																DNQ							DNQ							
142	Ed Baugess																									DNQ					
143	Harry Goularte																													DNQ	
144	Jimmy Insolo																													DNQ	
145	Jack Sellers																													DNQ	
146	Kevin Terris																													DNQ	
147	Bob Kennedy																													DNQ	
148	Brad Tidrick																													DNQ	
149	Randy Becker																													DNQ	
150	Ron Rainwater																													DNQ	
151	John Soares Jr.																													DNQ	
152	Bob Penrod	Wth																													
153	Slick Johnson	QL			QL																										
Pos.	Driver	DAY	RCH	CAR	ATL	BRI	DAR	NWS	MAR	TAL	DOV	CLT	RIV	POC	MCH	DAY	POC	TAL	GLN	MCH	BRI	DAR	RCH	DOV	MAR	NWS	CLT	CAR	ATL	RIV	Pts

== Rookie of the Year ==
Alan Kulwicki, a future hall of famer (see Class of 2019 hall of fame) driving for a team that had only one car (which he would buy out before the Southern 500 and become an owner/driver), won the Rookie of the Year award in 1986 despite skipping 6 races (3 of those he failed to qualify for, rounds 1, 2, and 9), finishing in the top-ten four times. Of the rest of the candidates, only runner-up Michael Waltrip ran a complete schedule.

== See also ==
- 1986 NASCAR Busch Series
- 1986 NASCAR Winston West Series
