= Rick Baldwin =

American racing driver (1955-1997)

- Born: Richard Allen Baldwin; June 10, 1955; Corpus Christi, Texas, U.S.
- Died: June 12, 1997 (aged 42); San Antonio, Texas, U.S.
- Cause of death: Head injuries from racing accident

NASCAR Cup Series career
- 11 races run over 5 years
- Best finish: 64th (1985)
- First race: 1981 Budweiser NASCAR 400 (Texas World)
- Last race: 1986 Budweiser 500 (Dover)
Wins	Top tens	Poles
0	0	0

Richard Allen Baldwin (June 10, 1955 – June 12, 1997) was an American racing driver who competed on the NASCAR circuit. He ran a few races each season between 1983 and 1985, running his self-owned Dodge Mirada and Chrysler Imperial.

On June 14, 1986, Baldwin was substituting for the injured Buddy Arrington at the Miller American 400 at Michigan International Speedway, part of the NASCAR Winston Cup Series. During qualifying, Baldwin spun and hit the wall, driver's side first, between turns one and two, resulting in massive head injuries.

In January 1992, a lawsuit that was filed by Baldwin's wife Deborah, claiming the window net had allowed her husband's head to strike the wall, was decided in favor of NASCAR, which was cleared of negligence by a twelve-person state district court jury.

After eleven years in a coma, Baldwin died two days after his 42nd birthday in 1997. The fatality was the first driver death in the history of Michigan International Speedway. Baldwin had two daughters, Jennifer and Tiffany.

Preceded by Terry Schoonover	NASCAR Cup Series; 1986 (died in 1997)	Succeeded by Grant Adcox
