= Hawaiian Punch =

Fruit punch brand

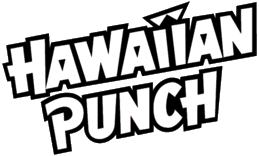
- Product type: Beverage
- Current owner: Keurig Dr Pepper
- Country: United States
- Introduced: 1934; 92 years ago
- Website: www.hawaiianpunch.com

Hawaiian Punch is an American brand of fruit punch currently manufactured by Keurig Dr Pepper, originally invented in 1934 by A.W. Leo, Tom Yeats, and Ralph Harrison as a topping for ice cream. It was started from an original syrup flavor titled Leo's Hawaiian Punch, containing orange, pineapple, passion fruit, guava and papaya, and has been available in 14 flavors since 2020. Though earlier versions contained 10% fruit juice, the drink is currently made with 3% fruit juice.

== History ==
Leo's Hawaiian Punch was created as an ice cream topping syrup in 1934 by A.W. Leo, Tom Yeats, and Ralph Harrison in a converted garage in Fullerton, California. It originally contained 5 fruit juices: orange, pineapple, passion fruit, guava and papaya—all imported from Hawaii. Although customers later discovered that it made an appealing drink when mixed with water, Hawaiian Punch (with "Leo's" name omitted) was available only wholesale in gallon glass jugs to ice cream parlors and soda fountains. The original company was named Pacific Citrus Products (PCP).

In 1946, Reuben P. Hughes purchased the company and renamed it the Pacific Hawaiian Products Company and quickly set about making Hawaiian Punch Base available directly to consumers in 1 quart glass containers. The immediate post-war period saw the introduction of ready-to-serve Hawaiian Punch in 46 oz tins (1950) and frozen concentrate (1955). Sometime around 1954, the brand was expanded to a second flavor, Sunshine Yellow. The original red Hawaiian Punch became the "Rosy" flavor. At that same time, a sixth fruit flavor, apricot puree, was added to the formula. The Sunshine Yellow flavor omitted the orange juice of the original and replaced the original red food coloring with yellow. By 1955, Hawaiian Punch had become a national brand.

R. J. Reynolds Tobacco Company bought Pacific Hawaiian in 1962 and later transferred it to its newly acquired Del Monte subsidiary in 1981. At the time, Hawaiian Punch was marketed primarily as a cocktail mixer, but under RJR's leadership, the company conducted market research studies to housewives and children and directed marketing to the household market. RJR introduced individual sized 8 ounce cans in 1973 and a powdered form, similar to Kool-Aid, in 1976. By 1978, Hawaiian Punch was available in liquid, frozen concentrate, shelf concentrate, pre-sweetened powder, and unsweetened powder form. In 1983, RJR introduced the first nationally distributed juice box, which increased sales by 35%.

Procter & Gamble bought Hawaiian Punch from Del Monte, spun off from RJR Nabisco in 1989, a year later. Procter & Gamble sold Hawaiian Punch to Cadbury Schweppes in 1999. Dr Pepper Snapple was spun off from Cadbury Schweppes in 2008. In 2018, Dr Pepper Snapple merged with Keurig Green Mountain to become Keurig Dr Pepper.

== Mascot ==
In 1961, the Atherton-Privett ad agency created a 20-second commercial to advertise Hawaiian Punch drink. The commercial was produced by John Urie and Associates in Hollywood. Jean Guy Jacques was the director; Bob Guidi and John Urie designed the two characters, Punchy and Oaf. Ross Martin did Punchy's voice, "Hey! How 'bout a nice Hawaiian Punch?" and John Urie did Oaf's line, "Sure". Rod Scribner animated the commercials. Sam Cornell also worked on the later versions. Oaf never learned to say "No" and Punchy's response was always to punch him. The commercial ended with Punchy leaning on a can of Hawaiian Punch, saying, "Wasn't that a refreshing commercial?" and grins with a loud twinkling sound. The commercial won many awards.

Although the character was introduced prior to RJR's ownership, they took it to a new level with "television commercials, magazines, and Sunday comics and on school book covers, toys, clothing, tumblers, and wrist watches" featuring the character marketed to children. The RJR employee magazine stated “[h]is presence on point-of-purchase displays lends instant eye-appeal” and named Punchy “[t]he best salesman the beverage has ever had."

The Punchy and Oaf (sometimes known as "Opie") characters were used in the product's commercials well into the 1980s, and again for a period in the early 1990s.

== Flavors ==
=== Original syrup ===
- Leo's Hawaiian Punch

(became Hawaiian Punch, but the original consumer product in 1946 was titled Hawaiian Punch Base)

=== Original canned flavors ===
- Rosy Red (later Fruit Juicy)
- Sunshine Yellow

=== 2 additional flavors by 1966 ===
- Orange
- Grape

(Sunshine Yellow contained banana puree by 1966)

=== Other flavors 1967 & later ===
- Cherry
- Strawberry
- Lemonade

=== Added 1969 ===
- Fruit Juicy Red Low Calorie

=== Added 1971 ===
- Cherry Royal

=== 1975 canned flavors ===
- Fruit Juicy Red
- Great Grape
- Sunshine Orange
- Tropical Fruit
- Very Berry
- Fruit Punch Low Sugar

=== 1975 "Drink Mix" flavors ===
- Red Punch
- Strawberry Punch
- Tutti Frutti Punch

=== Post-1980 canned flavors ===
- Fruit Juicy Red
- Fruit Juicy Red Light
- Green Berry Rush: strawberry and kiwi
- Mazin' Melon Mix: melon
- Bodacious Berry: berry
- Orange Ocean: orange
- Wild Purple Smash: grape and berry
- Lemonade: old-fashioned lemonade
- Berry Blue Typhoon: strawberry, blueberry, raspberry and kiwi
- Berry Bonkers: strawberry, blueberry, raspberry and pomegranate
- Lemon Berry Squeeze: strawberry and lemonade
- Berry Limeade Blast: strawberry and limeade
- Lemon Lime Splash: lemon and lime
- Island Citrus Guava: guava and lime
- Polar Blast: orange and raspberry
- Mango Passionfruit Squeeze: mango and passion fruit
- Mango Monsoon: orange, mango and pineapple
- White Water Wave: coconut and pineapple
- Watermelon Berry Boom: strawberry and watermelon

=== Product flavors since 2020 ===
The following fruit flavors are offered by Keurig Dr Pepper:

- Hawaiian Punch Berry Blue Typhoon Juice Drink
- Hawaiian Punch Berry Bonkers Juice Drink
- Hawaiian Punch Berry Limeade Blast Juice Drink
- Hawaiian Punch Fruit Juicy Red Juice Drink
- Hawaiian Punch Fruit Juicy Red Juice Drink Light
- Hawaiian Punch Green Berry Rush Juice Drink
- Hawaiian Punch Lemon Berry Squeeze Juice Drink
- Hawaiian Punch Lemon Lime Splash Juice Drink
- Hawaiian Punch Lemonade Juice Drink
- Hawaiian Punch Mango Monsoon Juice Drink
- Hawaiian Punch Orange Ocean Juice Drink
- Hawaiian Punch Punch Polar Blast Juice Drink
- Hawaiian Punch Watermelon Berry Boom Juice Drink
- Hawaiian Punch Whitewater Wave Juice Drink
