= Ron Eaton =

American racing driver (born 1943)

- Born: August 11, 1943 (age 83); Tacoma, Washington, U.S.
- Achievements: 3-time NASCAR AutoZone Elite Division Northwest Series champion (1986, 1988, 1995)

ARCA Menards Series West career
- 61 races run over 16 years
- Best finish: 12th (1979)
- First race: 1973 Portland 100 (Portland)
- Last race: 1991 Uhlmann Motors 200 (Olympia)
- First win: 1978 Winston Langley 100 (Langley)
- Last win: 1984 Yakima Winston 150 (Yakima)
Wins	Top tens	Poles
11	28	13
- Statistics up to date as of February 25, 2025.

Ron Eaton (born August 11, 1943) is an American former professional stock car racing driver. He competed in the NASCAR Winston West Series, NASCAR AutoZone Elite Division Southwest Series, and NASCAR AutoZone Elite Division Northwest Series.

== Racing career ==
=== NASCAR Winston West Series ===
Eaton competed in 61 races in what is now the ARCA Menards Series West between 1973 and 1991. Eaton scored his first career win at Portland Speedway in 1973. He would win ten more races in the series, his last coming at Yakima Speedway in 1984. Additionally, Eaton scored 13 poles and 28 top-tens during his time in the series.

=== NASCAR Southwest Series ===
From 1991 to 2001, Eaton competed in the NASCAR AutoZone Elite Division Southwest Series, making 21 starts and scoring a lone win in 1996.

=== NASCAR Northwest Series ===
The primary series in which Eaton competed was the NASCAR AutoZone Elite Division Northwest Series, a series he ran in for 21 years, making 228 starts and winning the championship three times (1986, 1988, 1995). Eaton's best season was in 1995, where after 13 races he had already scored four wins and nine top-fives. He scored an additional win and three more top-fives by the conclusion of the season, wrapping up his third and final championship season. His final win came in 2001, and made his final start in the series at the Wenatchee Valley Super Oval in 2006, where he finished last due to engine issues.

== Motorsports career results ==
=== NASCAR ===
(key) (Bold – Pole position awarded by qualifying time. Italics – Pole position earned by points standings or practice time. * – Most laps led.)

==== Winston West Series ====
NASCAR Winston West Series results
Year	Team	No.	Make	1	2	3	4	5	6	7	8	9	10	11	12	13	14	15	16	17	18	19	20	21	22	NWWSC	Pts	Ref
1973	Eaton Racing	17	Ford	AMP	MAD	S99	AUR	KFS	CBS	USP	POR; 13															29th	291	
1973	Eaton Racing	17	Chevy									SPS; 5	WER	SGS	CAJ	OSS	CSP	BKS	LAG	EVG; 22	WSP	YAK	POR; 6	AMP		29th	291	
1976	Eaton Racing	7	Chevy	RSD	RSD	EVG; 4	WSP; 11	USP	POR; 16	SHA	SGS	EVG; 23	YAK	POR; 3	LAG	ONT										16th	295	
1977	Eaton Racing	07	Chevy	RSD	LAG; 23	ONT	SJS	MMR	ASP	RSD	SGS	YAK; 14	EVG; 21	WSP	USP											32nd	221	
1977	Eaton Racing	7	Chevy													POR; 2	AAS	CRS	ASP	SHA	POR	ONT	PHO			32nd	221	
1978	Eaton Racing	07	Chevy	RSD	AAS	S99	SHA	PET	MMR	RSD	IFS	YAK; 3	WSP	LSP; 1*	EVG; 24	POR	CRS	ASP	SON	SHA	CBS					25th	184	
1978	Eaton Racing	07	Pontiac																			YAK; 2	OSS	ONT	PHO	25th	184	
1979	Eaton Racing	7	Pontiac	RSD	MMR	RSD	EVG; 6	YAK; 1*	POR	AAS	SHA	CRS	SON	EVG; 1*	SPO; 9	POR; 1*	ASP	ONT	PHO							12th	267	
1980	Eaton Racing	7	Pontiac	RSD	ONT	**S99**; 11	RSD	LAG	**EVG**; 1*	**POR**; **5**	SON	MMR	ONT	PHO												21st	146	
1982	Eaton Racing	7	Buick	**MMR**; 18	S99	AAS	RSD	**POR**; 1*	**WSP**; 19	**SHA**; 1*	**EVG**; 1*	SON; 21	CDR; 7	RSD; 19	RSD	PHO; 23										13th	379	
1983	Eaton Racing	7	Buick	S99; 3	SON; 17	RSD	YAK; 1	EVG; 4	SHA	RSD	**CPL**; 14	RSD	PHO; 1													13th	286	
1984	Eaton Racing	7	Buick	RSD	**YAK**; 1*	SIR; 21	**POR**; 9*	EVG; 19	SHA	WSR	SON	MMR	RSD	**PHO**; 22												18th	193	
1985	Eaton Racing	7	Buick	SON	SHA	RSD	MMR	SIR; 20	POR; 17	STA	YAK	**EVG**; 9	WSR	MMR	RSD											26th	110	
1986	Eaton Racing	7	Buick	SON	RSD	EVG; 4	RCS	TAC; 11	PIR	WSR	RSD															29th	87	
1987	Eaton Racing	7	Buick	SON	RSD	SGP	EVG; 18	POR; 5	TAC; 24	MMR	RSD															25th	104	
1988	Eaton Racing	7	Buick	SON	MMR	RSD	SGP	POR; 17	EVG; 23	MMR	PHO															33rd	62	
1989	Eaton Racing	7	Pontiac	MAD	MMR	RAS	SON	POR; 19	TCR	EVG; 20	MMR	SGS	SON	PHO												31st	209	
1990	Eaton Racing	7	Pontiac	MMR	SON	SGS	POR; 16	EVG	RAS	TCR	MMR	PHO														44nd	115	
1991	Eaton Racing	7	Pontiac	EVG; 18	MMR	SON	SGS	POR	EVG; 23	SSS; 16	MMR	PHO														26th	318	
