= 1989 NASCAR Winston West Series =

36th season of the NASCAR Winston West Series

Seasons
- ← 1988 1990 →

The 1989 NASCAR Winston West Series was the 36th season of the series. The title was won by Bill Schmitt, his third in the series and first since 1979.

== Teams and drivers ==
=== Complete schedule ===
Manufacturer	Team	No.	Driver
Buick	St. James Racing	22	St. James Davis
Chevrolet	Schmitt Racing	73	Bill Schmitt
Chevrolet	Spears Motorsports	75	Bill Sedgwick
Ford	Razore Racing	79	Roy Smith
Pontiac	Bob Walker Racing	88	Bob Walker
Pontiac	McGriff Motorsports	04	Hershel McGriff
Buick 9 Chevrolet 2	Emerson Racing	44	Jack Sellers
Pontiac 10 Buick 1	Krebs Racing	99	John Krebs
Pontiac 8 Chevrolet 3	McCray Racing	08	Rick McCray

=== Limited schedule ===
Manufacturer	Team	No.	Driver	Races
Buick	Beebe Racing	93	Troy Beebe	3
Buick	Tidrick Racing	72	Brad Tidrick	4
Buick	Unknown	17	Tony Heckart	1
Buick	Unknown	77	Tony Heckart	1
Ford	George Jefferson	90	Chad Little	1
Ford	McKnight Racing	83	Sumner McKnight	7
Ford	Melling Racing	9	Bill Elliott	3
Ford	Unknown	65	Robert Sprague	3
Ford	Rouse Racing	19	Robert Sprague	7
Ford	Rouse Racing	9	Jim Danielsen	4
Ford	Rouse Racing	91	Jim Danielsen	1
Ford	Stoke Racing	19	Deake Lyndall	1
Ford	Stoke Racing	19	Bill Cooper	1
Chevrolet	Kieper Racing	98	Jerry Bowers	6
Chevrolet	Leonard Racing	46	Marta Leonard	1
Chevrolet	Myung Suk Lee	45	Bob Kennedy	1
Chevrolet	Price-Kanke Racing	63	Walt Price	3
Chevrolet	Price-Kanke Racing	63	Bud Hickey	1
Chevrolet	Scribner Racing	15	Rick Scribner	2
Chevrolet	Scribner Racing	15	Gary Scott	1
Chevrolet	Scribner Racing	50	Rick Scribner	1
Chevrolet	Sara Vincent	1	Jim Bown	2
Chevrolet	Sara Vincent	41	Keith Van Houten	2
Chevrolet	Sara Vincent	41	Jim Bown	1
Chevrolet	Sara Vincent	41	Gary Scott	3
Chevrolet	Sara Vincent	41	Danny Lawson	2
Chevrolet	Sara Vincent	41	Ron Hornaday Jr.	1
Chevrolet	Sara Vincent	41	Rick Scribner	1
Chevrolet	Unknown	70	Steve Schmidt	1
Oldsmobile	Esau Racing	56	Ron Esau	3
Oldsmobile	Esau Racing	62	Ron Esau	1
Oldsmobile	French Racing	14	Mike French	4
Oldsmobile	Larry Gaylord	68	Larry Gaylord	2
Oldsmobile	Matt Puskarich	13	Ted Kennedy	1
Oldsmobile	Marion Collins	28	Gary Collins	2
Oldsmobile	Tom Hathaway	89	Bob Howard	3
Oldsmobile	True Dee Paques	56	Jon Paques	1
Oldsmobile	Unknown	11	Rick Catalano	2
Pontiac	Eaton Racing	7	Ron Eaton	2
Pontiac	Hickingbottom Racing	77	Mike Hickingbottom	1
Pontiac	Hoenshell Racing	38	Duke Hoenshell	6
Pontiac	Unknown	07	Mark Walbridge	5
Pontiac	Unknown	50	Mark Walbridge	1
Pontiac	Jenny Van Houten	35	Keith Van Houten	1
Pontiac	Price-Kanke Racing	03	Dave Mood	2
Pontiac	Ray Kelly	74	Ray Kelly	1
Buick 9 Chevrolet 1	Gilliland Racing	24	Butch Gilliland	10
Buick 1 Ford 1	Gautsche Racing	82	Jim Danielsen	2
Chevrolet 3 Pontiac 2	Midgley Racing	09	Terry Fisher	4
Chevrolet 3 Pontiac 2	Midgley Racing	09	Derrike Cope	1

== Schedule and results ==
The 1989 season included 11 individual races, although Mesa Marin Raceway and Sears Point International Raceway hosted two races each. The first race at Sears Point and the season finale at Phoenix International Raceway were in combination with the NASCAR Winston Cup Series.

Date	Name	Racetrack	Location	Winner
April 30	Budweiser 200	Madera Speedway	Madera, California	Bill Sedgwick
May 13	Spears Manufacturing 200	Mesa Marin Raceway	Bakersfield, California	Hershel McGriff
May 27	Bank of Loleta/U.S. Bank 200	Redwood Acres Speedway	Eureka, California	Bill Sedgwick
June 11	Banquet Frozen Foods 300	Sears Point International Raceway	Sonoma, California	Ricky Rudd
July 4	Winston 200	Portland Speedway	Portland, Oregon	Bill Schmitt
July 8	Pontiac Excitement 200	Tri-City Raceway	West Richland, Washington	Roy Smith
July 17	Motorcraft 500	Evergreen Speedway	Monroe, Washington	Chad Little
August 5	Coors 200	Mesa Marin Raceway	Bakersfield, California	Roy Smith
August 12	Winston 200	Saugus Speedway	Saugus, California	Bill Sedgwick
October 1	Winston 200	Sears Point International Raceway	Sonoma, California	Bill Schmitt
November 5	Autoworks 500	Phoenix International Raceway	Avondale, Arizona	Bill Elliott

=== Budweiser 200 ===
The Budweiser 200 was held on April 30 at Madera Speedway. Bill Sedgwick won the pole.

Top Ten Results

1. 75 - Bill Sedgwick
2. 79 - Roy Smith
3. 04 - Hershel McGriff
4. 73 - Bill Schmitt
5. 24 - Butch Gilliland
6. 98 - Jerry Bowers -1
7. 83 - Sumner McKnight -2
8. 82 - Jim Danielsen -2
9. 99 - John Krebs -5
10. 44 - Jack Sellers -8
- Bill Sedgwick started the season with a win, leading 118 of the 200 laps. Hershel McGriff was the only other driver to lead during the race, but Sedgwick was able to regain the lead due to McGriff suffering from handling problems.

=== Spears Manufacturing 200 ===
The Spears Manufacturing 200 was held on May 13 at Mesa Marin Raceway. Bill Sedgwick won the pole.

Top Ten Results

1. 04 - Hershel McGriff
2. 08 - Rick McCray
3. 75 - Bill Sedgwick
4. 79 - Roy Smith
5. 73 - Bill Schmitt -1
6. 09 - Terry Fisher -2
7. 19 - Deake Lyndall -2
8. 83 - Sumner McKnight -3
9. 98 - Jerry Bowers -3
10. 14 - Mike French -5
- In winning the race, Hershel McGriff became the oldest driver to win a major NASCAR series race, aged 61 years and 4 months. It was the 34th and final win of his West Series career.
- Bill Sedgwick would maintain the points lead, staying a mere 5 points ahead of Bill Schmitt.

=== Bank of Loleta/U.S. Food Bank 200 ===
The Bank of Loleta/U.S. Food Bank 200 was held on May 27 at Redwood Acres Speedway. Hershel McGriff won the pole.

Top Ten Results

1. 75 - Bill Sedgwick
2. 88 - Bob Walker
3. 79 - Roy Smith
4. 73 - Bill Schmitt
5. 98 - Jerry Bowers
6. 08 - Rick McCray -1
7. 04 - Hershel McGriff -2
8. 19 - John Krebs -4
9. 14 - Mike French -8
10. 44 - Jack Sellers -17
- The race was Sedgwick's second win of the year, and extended his points lead to 39, with Hershel McGriff moving into 2nd.

=== Banquet Frozen Foods 300 ===
The Banquet Frozen Foods 300 was held on June 11 at Sears Point International Raceway and was the first of two combination races with the NASCAR Winston Cup Series. Rusty Wallace won the pole.

Top Ten Results

1. 26 - Ricky Rudd
2. 27 - Rusty Wallace
3. 9 - Bill Elliott
4. 3 - Dale Earnhardt
5. 83 - Lake Speed
6. 88 - Joe Ruttman
7. 75 - Morgan Shepherd
8. 4 - Rick Wilson
9. 28 - Davey Allison
10. 30 - Michael Waltrip

Failed to qualify: 76 - Bill Sedgwick, 52 - Jimmy Means, 44 - Jack Sellers, 80 - Bob Walker, 90 - Stan Barrett, 46 - Marta Leonard, 22 - St. James Davis, 41 - Jim Courage

- Mark Martin actually rolled his car during the race due to an error by a new tire changer (only two of the five lug nuts were properly fastened on the car). Right after the car left the pits, the right rear came off, the car spun, hit the tire barrier and rolled onto its roof. However, he came back to finish the race in 31st, 5 laps down.
- This would be Buick's penultimate victory in the NASCAR Cup Series.
- Hershel McGriff took the West Series points lead by 36 points over Bill Schmitt, with title contender Bill Sedgwick failing to make the race. McGriff was the highest finishing West Series driver and therefore was awarded points equivalent to a win.

=== Winston 200 (Portland) ===
The Winston 200 was held on July 4 at Portland Speedway. Hershel McGriff won the pole.

Top Ten Results

1. 73 - Bill Schmitt
2. 98 - Jerry Bowers
3. 99 - John Krebs -1
4. 75 - Bill Sedgwick -1
5. 1 - Jim Bown -1
6. 19 - Robert Sprague -1
7. 79 - Roy Smith -1
8. 09 - Terry Fisher -1
9. 24 - Butch Gilliland -2
10. 9 - Jim Danielsen -3
- The race was Bill Schmitt's first win of the season, and he would take over the points lead from Hershel McGriff, who was now 27 points behind.
- Schmitt led only 3 of the 200 laps; Mark Walbridge led the most laps in the event at 74, but was 6 laps down by the finish. McGriff led 50 laps during the event, but was the last car running, finishing 17th and 25 laps off the pace.

=== Pontiac Excitement 200 ===
The Pontiac Excitement 200 was held on July 8 at Tri-City Raceway. Bill Sedgwick won the pole.

Top Ten Results

1. 79 - Roy Smith
2. 73 - Bill Schmitt
3. 98 - Jerry Bowers
4. 08 - Rick McCray
5. 75 - Bill Sedgwick
6. 07 - Mark Walbridge -1
7. 19 - Robert Sprague -2
8. 9 - Jim Danielsen -4
9. 72 - Brad Tidrick -6
10. 99 - John Krebs -8
- The race was Roy Smith's first win of the season, and he would move to 2nd in the point standings, 31 points behind Bill Schmitt.
- Smith led only 4 of the 200 laps; for the second race in a row, Mark Walbridge would lead the most laps, but again fell off the lead lap.

=== Motorcraft 500 ===
The Motorcraft 500 was held on July 17 at Evergreen Speedway. Defending Winston Cup Series champion Bill Elliott won the pole.

Top Ten Results

1. 90 - Chad Little
2. 79 - Roy Smith
3. 04 - Hershel McGriff
4. 09 - Derrike Cope -4
5. 72 - Brad Tidrick -14
6. 73 - Bill Schmitt -16
7. 08 - Rick McCray -18
8. 24 - Butch Gilliland -20
9. 14 - Mike French -21
10. 1 - Jim Bown -22
- Making his only West Series standalone appearance of the year, Chad Little scored his 5th and final career win in the series. He led for 375 of the 500 laps, however only winning by just over 1 second.
- The race distance of 500 laps was the longest all season, and only 12 of the 29 competitors were able to finish the race. Among those failing to finish was polesitter Bill Elliott, who was making his only standalone West Series appearance of the year but retired from the event after 48 laps due to head gasket issues.
- Bill Schmitt retained his points lead over Roy Smith, but Smith, on the strength of a second-place finish, cut the gap to just 6 points.

=== Coors 200 ===
The Coors 200 was held on August 5 at Mesa Marin Raceway, the second time the series visited the track during the season. Troy Beebe won the pole.

Top Ten Results

1. 79 - Roy Smith
2. 75 - Bill Sedgwick
3. 73 - Bill Schmitt
4. 93 - Troy Beebe
5. 19 - Robert Sprague -2
6. 99 - John Krebs -3
7. 56 - Ron Esau -4
8. 08 - Rick McCray -5
9. 04 - Hershel McGriff -5
10. 88 - Bob Walker -5
- The race was Roy Smith's second win of the season, and he would cut the deficit to points leader Bill Schmitt to just 1 point. Smith nearly lost a lap on pit road during a caution, but was able to get by polesitter Troy Beebe and Bill Schmitt in the closing laps to score the win. Schmitt's brakes began failing late, and Bill Sedgwick was able to climb to 2nd.

=== Winston 200 (Saugus) ===
The Winston 200 was held on August 12 at Saugus Speedway. Hershel McGriff won the pole.

Top Ten Results

1. 75 - Bill Sedgwick
2. 04 - Hershel McGriff
3. 79 - Roy Smith
4. 73 - Bill Schmitt
5. 08 - Rick McCray -1
6. 38 - Duke Hoenshell -2
7. 99 - John Krebs -18
8. 44 - Jack Sellers -28
9. 24 - Butch Gilliland -44
10. 19 - Robert Sprague -69
- The race was the third and final win of the season for Bill Sedgwick. Despite smoke seeping from his car in the closing laps, Sedgwick held on to score the win over Hershel McGriff.
- Roy Smith would take over the points lead, leaving the race with a 4 point advantage over Bill Schmitt.
- This was the second race of the year to be titled "Winston 200."

=== Winston 200 (Sonoma) ===
The Winston 200 was held on October 1 at Sears Point International Raceway, the second time the series visited the track during the season, although this time it was a standalone West race. Bill Sedgwick won the pole.

Top Ten Results

1. 73 - Bill Schmitt
2. 75 - Bill Sedgwick
3. 08 - Rick McCray
4. 38 - Duke Hoenshell
5. 9 - Jim Danielsen
6. 93 - Troy Beebe -1
7. 24 - Butch Gilliland -3
8. 45 - Bob Kennedy -4
9. 19 - Robert Sprague -6
10. 09 - Terry Fisher -7
- The race was the second and final win of the season for Bill Schmitt, who would take the points lead from Roy Smith, who finished 17th due to clutch problems, and go into the season finale with a 64 point advantage.
- This was the third race of the year to be titled "Winston 200." It was also the final standalone West Series race of the season.

=== Autoworks 500 ===
The Autoworks 500 was held on November 5 at Phoenix International Raceway and was the second of two combination races with the NASCAR Winston Cup Series. Ken Schrader won the pole.

Top Ten Results

1. 9 - Bill Elliott
2. 11 - Terry Labonte
3. 6 - Mark Martin
4. 17 - Darrell Waltrip
5. 29 - Dale Jarrett
6. 3 - Dale Earnhardt
7. 84 - Dick Trickle
8. 33 - Harry Gant
9. 30 - Michael Waltrip
10. 88 - Jimmy Spencer

Failed to qualify: 18 - Tommy Ellis, 41 - Danny Lawson, 89 - Bob Howard, 35 - Keith Van Houten, 07 - Mark Walbridge, 44 - Jack Sellers, 19 - Robert Sprague, 24 - Butch Gilliland, 22 - St. James Davis, 80 - Bob Walker, 08 - Rick McCray, 99 - John Krebs, 38 - Duke Hoenshell, 04 - Hershel McGriff, 50 - Rick Scribner

- Two cars entered by Hendrick Motorsports (the No. 46 City Chevrolet driven by Greg Sacks and the No. 51 Exxon Chevrolet driven by Bobby Hamilton) were entered to get in-race footage for the 1990 film Days of Thunder. Hamilton actually led the race with 100 laps to go (in his first career start) before the engine blew. A third movie car (the No. 18 Hardee's Chevrolet driven by Tommy Ellis) failed to make the race.
- Bill Schmitt was the highest finishing West Series driver, and the only one to make the race who was running at the finish. He was able to close out his third championship season and first since 1979, ending the season 79 points ahead of Bill Sedgwick.

== Full Drivers' Championship ==
(key) Bold – Pole position awarded by time. Italics – Pole position set by owner's points. * – Most laps led. † – Ineligible for West Series points

Pos	Driver	MAD	MMR	RAS	SON	POR	TCR	EVG	MMR	SGS	SON	PHO	Pts
1	Bill Schmitt	4	5	4	17	1	2	6	3*	4	1*	26	1845
2	Bill Sedgwick	**1***	**3**	1	DNQ	4	**5**	18	2	1*	**2**	36	1789
3	Roy Smith	2	4*	3	39	7	1	2	1	3	17	41	1766
4	Hershel McGriff	3	1	**7***	14	**17**	16	3	9	2	16	DNQ	1666
5	Rick McCray	15	2	6	28	11	4	7	8	5	3	DNQ	1626
6	John Krebs	9	17	8	33	3	10	15	6	7	14	DNQ	1524
7	Jack Sellers	10	19	10	DNQ	14	13	13	12	8	11	DNQ	1412
8	Robert Sprague	14	14	13		6	7	21	5	10	9	DNQ	1344
9	Bob Walker	11	22	2	DNQ	21	17	19	10	11	21	DNQ	1334
10	Butch Gilliland	5	15	16		9	15	8	22	9	7	DNQ	1304
11	St. James Davis	13	18	11	DNQ	15	12	24	20	13	19	DNQ	1259
12	Jerry Bowers	6	9	5		2	3	12	Wth				920
13	Jim Danielsen	8	21			10	8	17	11		5		915
14	Sumner McKnight	7	8	12		18	11	26	13				868
15	Mark Walbridge		11			12*	6*	27	18			DNQ	761
16	Duke Hoenshell				DNQ			11	17	6	4	DNQ	673
17	Terry Fisher		6		25	8					10		591
18	Ron Esau	16			41				7			35	565
19	Brad Tidrick					13	9	5			15		535
20	Mike French		10	9		20		9					513
21	Troy Beebe				24				**4**		6		475
22	Rick Scribner			15					14		12	DNQ	475
23	Gary Scott					16	14	14			20		460
24	Jim Bown				29	5		10					449
25	Keith Van Houten	12	23									DNQ	345
26	Bob Howard		24						19			DNQ	315
27	Walt Price		16					28		14			315
28	Rick Catalano		13	14									245
29	Gary Collins							16	15				233
30	Danny Lawson								16			DNQ	227
31	Ron Eaton					19		20					209
32	Chad Little							1*					185
33	Larry Gaylord					24		23					185
34	Tony Heckart					22		29					173
35	Derrike Cope							4					160
36	Deake Lyndall		7										146
37	Bill Cooper				35								142
38	Bob Kennedy										8		142
39	Ron Hornaday Jr.									12			127
40	Ray Kelly		12										127
41	Marta Leonard				DNQ								127
42	Jon Paques										13		124
43	Steve Schmidt										18		109
44	Ted Kennedy		20										103
45	Mike Hickingbottom							22					97
46	Bud Hickey					23							94
47	Bill Elliott				3†			**25**				1†	93
48	Dave Mood								21	15			0
	Jim Courage				DNQ								

== See also ==
- 1989 NASCAR Winston Cup Series
- 1989 NASCAR Busch Series
