= 1989 Motorcraft 500 =

7th race of the 1989 NASCAR Winston West Series

Race details
- Race 7 of 11 in the 1989 NASCAR Winston West Series season
- Date: July 17, 1989
- Location: Evergreen Speedway in Monroe, Washington
- Course: Permanent racing facility
- Course length: 0.646 miles (1.006 km)
- Distance: 500 laps, 323.00 mi (519.82 km)
- Average speed: 74.272 miles per hour (119.529 km/h)

Pole position
Driver	Bill Elliott	Melling Racing

Most laps led
Driver	Chad Little	Jefferson Racing
- Laps: 375

Winner
No. 90	Chad Little	Jefferson Racing

The 1989 Motorcraft 500 was the seventh stock car race of the 1989 NASCAR Winston West Series season. The race was held on Monday, July 17, 1989, at Evergreen Speedway, a 0.625 mi (1.006 km) oval shaped racetrack in Monroe, Washington. The race was originally scheduled for Sunday, July 16, but was delayed to Monday due to rain. The race took the scheduled 500 laps to complete. Chad Little won the race, his first of the season and last of his career. Little won by 1.2 seconds over Roy Smith after leading the final 198 laps and holding off Smith through two late race restarts. Hershel McGriff finished third, the only other car on the lead lap. Derrike Cope and Brad Tidrick rounded out the top five.

== Report ==
=== Background ===
Evergreen Speedway is a racetrack located within the confines of the Evergreen State Fairgrounds in Monroe, Washington. The layout of the track is unique in that it incorporates an oversized 0.625 mi (1.006 km) paved outer oval, a 0.375 mi (0.604 km) paved inner oval, a 0.200 mi (0.322 km) paved inner oval, a 0.125 mi (0.201 km) dragstrip, and the #2 ranked figure-eight track in the United States.

==== Entry list ====
No.	Driver	Owner	Manufacturer
1	Jim Bown	Sara Vincent	Chevrolet
04	Hershel McGriff	Hershel McGriff	Pontiac
07	Mark Walbridge	Unknown	Pontiac
7	Ron Eaton	Ron Eaton	Pontiac
08	Rick McCray	Rick McCray	Pontiac
09	Derrike Cope	Dick Midgley	Chevrolet
9	Bill Elliott	Harry Melling	Ford
14	Mike French	Mike French	Oldsmobile
17	Tony Heckart	Unknown	Buick
19	Robert Sprague	Fred Stoke/Larry Rouse	Ford
22	St. James Davis	LaDonna Davis	Buick
24	Butch Gilliland	Butch Gilliland	Buick
28	Gary Collins	Marion Collins	Oldsmobile
38	Duke Hoenshell	Duke Hoenshell	Pontiac
41	Gary Scott	Sara Vincent	Chevrolet
44	Jack Sellers	Adele Emerson	Buick
63	Walt Price	M. K. Kanke	Chevrolet
68	Larry Gaylord	Larry Gaylord	Oldsmobile
72	Brad Tidrick	Cindi Tidrick	Buick
73	Bill Schmitt	Bill Schmitt	Chevrolet
75	Bill Sedgwick	Wayne Spears	Chevrolet
77	Mike Hickingbottom	Mike Hickingbottom	Pontiac
79	Roy Smith	Warren Razore	Ford
83	Sumner McKnight	Sumner McKnight	Ford
88	Bob Walker	Bob Walker	Pontiac
90	Chad Little	George Jefferson/Fred Stoke	Ford
91	J.C. Danielsen	Larry Rouse	Ford
98	Jerry Bowers	John Kieper	Chevrolet
99	John Krebs	John Krebs	Pontiac

== Qualifying ==
The first round of qualifying was held on Friday, July 14, and determined the first 20 starting positions, with final qualifying taking place on Saturday. Defending NASCAR Winston Cup Series champion Bill Elliott won the pole with a speed of 97.436 mph.

=== Qualifying results ===
Pos	#	Driver	Owner	Make	Speed
1	9	Bill Elliott	Harry Melling	Ford	97.436
2	90	Chad Little	George Jefferson/Fred Stoke	Ford	96.973
3	73	Bill Schmitt	Bill Schmitt	Chevrolet	96.916
4	1	Jim Bown	Sara Vincent	Chevrolet	96.526
5	7	Ron Eaton	Ron Eaton	Pontiac	96.274
6	09	Derrike Cope	Dick Midgley	Chevrolet	96.258
7	99	John Krebs	John Krebs	Pontiac	96.210
8	04	Hershel McGriff	Hershel McGriff	Pontiac	96.171
9	83	Sumner McKnight	Sumner McKnight	Ford	96.032
10	79	Roy Smith	Warren Razore	Ford	96.020
11	07	Mark Walbridge	Unknown	Pontiac	95.767
12	19	Robert Sprague	Fred Stoke/Larry Rouse	Ford	95.645
13	08	Rick McCray	Rick McCray	Pontiac	95.401
14	98	Jerry Bowers	John Kieper	Chevrolet	95.401
15	75	Bill Sedgwick	Wayne Spears	Chevrolet	95.300
16	28	Gary Collins	Marion Collins	Oldsmobile	94.833
17	91	J.C. Danielsen	Larry Rouse	Ford	94.207
18	14	Mike French	Mike French	Oldsmobile	94.207
19	24	Butch Gilliland	Gilliland Racing	Buick	93.013
20	38	Duke Hoenshell	Duke Hoenshell	Pontiac	92.735
21	72	Brad Tidrick	Cindi Tidrick	Buick	92.447
22	88	Bob Walker	Bob Walker	Pontiac	91.718
23	44	Jack Sellers	Adele Emerson	Buick	90.255
24	22	St. James Davis	LaDonna Davis	Buick	88.034
25	68	Larry Gaylord	Larry Gaylord	Oldsmobile	87.245
26	77	Mike Hickingbottom	Mike Hickingbottom	Pontiac	84.368
27	41	Gary Scott	Sara Vincent	Chevrolet	83.670
28	63	Walt Price	M. K. Kanke	Chevrolet	–
29	17	Tony Heckart	Unknown	Buick	–

== Race results ==
Fin	St	#	Driver	Owner	Make	Laps	Led	Status	Pts
1	2	90	Chad Little	George Jefferson/Fred Stoke	Ford	500	375	Running	185
2	10	79	Roy Smith	Warren Razore	Ford	500	74	Running	175
3	8	04	Hershel McGriff	Hershel McGriff	Pontiac	500	14	Running	170
4	6	09	Derrike Cope	Dick Midgley	Chevrolet	496	0	Running	160
5	21	72	Brad Tidrick	Cindi Tidrick	Buick	486	0	Running	155
6	3	73	Bill Schmitt	Bill Schmitt	Chevrolet	484	0	Running	150
7	13	08	Rick McCray	Rick McCray	Pontiac	482	0	Accident	146
8	19	24	Butch Gilliland	Butch Gilliland	Buick	480	0	Running	142
9	18	14	Mike French	Mike French	Oldsmobile	479	0	Running	138
10	4	1	Jim Bown	Sara Vincent	Chevrolet	478	26	Accident	139
11	20	38	Duke Hoenshell	Duke Hoenshell	Pontiac	474	0	Running	130
12	14	98	Jerry Bowers	John Kieper	Chevrolet	472	0	Accident	127
13	23	44	Jack Sellers	Adele Emerson	Buick	464	0	Running	124
14	27	41	Gary Scott	Sara Vincent	Chevrolet	448	0	Running	121
15	7	99	John Krebs	John Krebs	Pontiac	445	0	Running	118
16	16	28	Gary Collins	Marion Collins	Oldsmobile	397	0	Engine	115
17	17	91	J.C. Danielsen	Larry Rouse	Ford	389	0	Engine	112
18	15	75	Bill Sedgwick	Wayne Spears	Chevrolet	388	0	Running	109
19	22	88	Bob Walker	Bob Walker	Pontiac	369	0	Fatigue	106
20	5	7	Ron Eaton	Ron Eaton	Pontiac	341	0	Fatigue	103
21	12	19	Robert Sprague	Fred Stoke/Larry Rouse	Ford	292	5	Engine	105
22	26	77	Mike Hickingbottom	Mike Hickingbottom	Pontiac	123	0	Oil Line	97
23	25	68	Larry Gaylord	Larry Gaylord	Oldsmobile	121	0	Suspension	94
24	24	22	St. James Davis	LaDonna Davis	Buick	88	0	Transmission	91
25	1	9	Bill Elliott	Harry Melling	Ford	48	6	Head Gasket	93
26	9	83	Sumner McKnight	Sumner McKnight	Ford	40	0	Accident	85
27	11	07	Mark Walbridge	Unknown	Pontiac	12	0	Accident	82
28	28	63	Walt Price	M. K. Kanke	Chevrolet	0	0	Engine	79
29	29	17	Tony Heckart	Unknown	Buick	0	0	Ignition	76

== Standings after the race ==
	Pos	Driver	Points
	1	Bill Schmitt	1150
	2	Roy Smith	1144 (–6)
	3	Hershel McGriff	1083 (–67)
	4	Rick McCray	1034 (–116)
	5	Bill Sedgwick	964 (–186)
	6	John Krebs	955 (–195)
	7	Jerry Bowers	920 (–230)
2	8	Butch Gilliland	796 (–354)
1	9	Robert Sprague	767 (–383)
1	10	Jack Sellers	743 (–407)

- Note: Only the first 10 positions are included for the driver standings.

Previous race: 1989 Pontiac Excitement 200	NASCAR Winston West Series; 1989 season	Next race: 1989 Coors 200
