= 1989 Spears Manufacturing 200 =

2nd race of the 1989 NASCAR Winston West Series

Race details
- Race 2 of 11 in the 1989 NASCAR Winston West Series season
- Location: Mesa Marin Speedway in Bakersfield, California
- Course: Permanent racing facility
- Course length: 0.500 miles (0.805 km)
- Distance: 200 laps, 100.00 mi (160.93 km)
- Average speed: 70.093 miles per hour (112.804 km/h)

Pole position
Driver	Bill Sedgwick	Spears Motorsports

Most laps led
Driver	Roy Smith	Razore Racing
- Laps: 80

Winner
No. 04	Hershel McGriff	McGriff Racing

The 1989 Spears Manufacturing 200 was the second stock car race of the 1989 NASCAR Winston West Series season. The race was held on Saturday, May 13, 1989, at Mesa Marin Raceway, a 0.500 mile (0.805 km) oval shaped racetrack in Bakersfield, California. The race took the scheduled 200 laps to complete. Hershel McGriff won the race, his first and only win of the season. McGriff won by 5.5 seconds over Rick McCray. McGriff traded the lead with Roy Smith several times, but would secure the position when Smith spun out on lap 187. Bill Sedgwick, Smith, and Bill Schmitt rounded out the top five. The race was the 34th and final win of McGriff's career, and in winning the race he became the oldest driver to win a major NASCAR series race, aged 61 days and four months.

== Report ==
=== Background ===
Mesa Marin Raceway was a 0.500 mi (0.805 km) paved oval race track, located near the junction of CA 178 and CA 184 (Kern Canyon Road), east of Bakersfield, California. It opened in 1977 and was owned by Marion Collins throughout its existence. The 1989 Spears Manufacturing 200 was one of 45 NASCAR Winston West Series races to be held at the track during its existence.

==== Entry list ====
No.	Driver	Owner	Manufacturer
04	Hershel McGriff	Hershel McGriff	Pontiac
08	Rick McCray	Rick McCray	Pontiac
09	Terry Fisher	Dick Midgley	Pontiac
11	Rick Catalano	Unknown	Oldsmobile
13	Ted Kennedy	Matt Puskarich	Oldsmobile
14	Mike French	Mike French	Oldsmobile
19	Deake Lyndall	Unknown	Ford
22	St. James Davis	LaDonna Davis	Buick
24	Butch Gilliland	Butch Gilliland	Buick
41	Keith Van Houten	Sara Vincent	Chevrolet
44	Jack Sellers	Adele Emerson	Buick
50	Mark Walbridge	Unknown	Pontiac
63	Walt Price	M. K. Kanke	Chevrolet
65	Robert Sprague	Unknown	Ford
73	Bill Schmitt	Bill Schmitt	Chevrolet
74	Ray Kelly	Ray Kelly	Pontiac
75	Bill Sedgwick	Wayne Spears	Chevrolet
79	Roy Smith	Warren Razore	Ford
82	J.C. Danielsen	Unknown	Ford
83	Sumner McKnight	Sumner McKnight	Ford
88	Bob Walker	Bob Walker	Pontiac
89	Bob Howard	Tom Hathaway	Oldsmobile
98	Jerry Bowers	John Kieper	Chevrolet
99	John Krebs	John Krebs	Pontiac

== Qualifying ==
Bill Sedgwick won the pole with a speed of 91.975 mph.

== Race results ==
Fin	St	#	Driver	Owner	Make	Laps	Led	Status	Pts
1	5	04	Hershel McGriff	Hershel McGriff	Pontiac	200	43	Running	180
2	8	08	Rick McCray	Rick McCray	Pontiac	200	0	Running	170
3	1	75	Bill Sedgwick	Wayne Spears	Chevrolet	200	60	Running	170
4	9	79	Roy Smith	Warren Razore	Ford	200	80	Running	170
5	7	73	Bill Schmitt	Bill Schmitt	Chevrolet	199	0	Running	155
6	16	09	Terry Fisher	Dick Midgley	Pontiac	198	8	Running	155
7	3	19	Deake Lyndall	Unknown	Ford	198	0	Running	146
8	12	83	Sumner McKnight	Sumner McKnight	Ford	197	0	Running	142
9	2	98	Jerry Bowers	John Kieper	Chevrolet	197	0	Running	138
10	23	14	Mike French	Mike French	Oldsmobile	195	0	Running	134
11	13	50	Mark Walbridge	Unknown	Pontiac	189	9	Running	135
12	18	74	Ray Kelly	Ray Kelly	Pontiac	186	0	Running	127
13	20	11	Rick Catalano	Unknown	Oldsmobile	177	0	Running	124
14	10	65	Robert Sprague	Unknown	Ford	172	0	Running	121
15	21	24	Butch Gilliland	Butch Gilliland	Buick	156	0	Running	118
16	17	63	Walt Price	M. K. Kanke	Chevrolet	151	0	Rear End	115
17	6	99	John Krebs	John Krebs	Pontiac	144	0	Running	112
18	22	22	St. James Davis	LaDonna Davis	Buick	117	0	Engine	109
19	11	44	Jack Sellers	Adele Emerson	Buick	57	0	Accident	106
20	19	13	Ted Kennedy	Matt Puskarich	Oldsmobile	49	0	Accident	103
21	15	82	J.C. Danielsen	Unknown	Ford	47	0	Suspension	100
22	14	88	Bob Walker	Bob Walker	Pontiac	38	0	Transmission	97
23	4	41	Keith Van Houten	Sara Vincent	Chevrolet	9	0	Engine	94
24	24	89	Bob Howard	Tom Hathaway	Oldsmobile	0	0	Engine	91

== Standings after the race ==
	Pos	Driver	Points
	1	Bill Sedgwick	355
1	2	Hershel McGriff	350 (-5)
1	3	Roy Smith	340 (-15)
	4	Bill Schmitt	315 (-40)
1	5	Jerry Bowers	288 (-67)
1	6	Sumner McKnight	288 (-67)
8	7	Rick McCray	288 (-67)
3	8	Butch Gilliland	273 (-82)
	9	John Krebs	250 (-105)
2	10	J.C. Danielsen	242 (-113)

- Note: Only the first 10 positions are included for the driver standings.

Previous race: 1989 Budweiser 200	NASCAR Winston West Series; 1989 season	Next race: 1989 Bank of Loleta/U.S. Bank 200
