= 1983 NASCAR Winston West Series =

30th season of the NASCAR Winston West Series

Seasons
- ← 1982 1984 →

The 1983 NASCAR Winston West Series was the 30th season of the series. The title was won by Jim Robinson, his first in the series.

== Teams and drivers ==
=== Complete schedule ===
Manufacturer	Team	No.	Driver
Buick	Don Waterman	38	Don Waterman
Buick	Gary Smith	04	Hershel McGriff
Buick	Kieper Racing	98	Jim Bown
Buick	Lee Racing	66	Ron Esau
Buick	Puskarich Racing	13	Doug Wheeler
Chevrolet	McKnight Racing	83	Sumner McKnight
Chevrolet	Pat Mintey	35	Pat Mintey
Oldsmobile	Lois Williams	78	Jim Robinson
Pontiac	McCray Racing	08	Rick McCray
Chevrolet 9 Buick 1	Schmitt Racing	73	Bill Schmitt

=== Partial schedule ===
Manufacturer	Team	No.	Driver	Races
Buick	Chuck Becker	87	Rick Becker	1
Buick	Dave Perry	1	Mark Perry	3
Buick	DiGard Motorsports	12	Jimmy Insolo	1
Buick	Earle Canavan	59	Earle Canavan	1
Buick	Eaton Racing	7	Ron Eaton	6
Buick	John Edgett	74	Roy Smith	4
Buick	John Edgett	74	Ivan Baldwin	1
Buick	John Edgett	74	Gary Johnson	1
Buick	Kennell Racing	88	Tim Kennell	4
Buick	Noble Racing	37	Dan Noble	4
Buick	Preston Bailey	61	Clive Skilton	6
Buick	Rick Bohney	20	Lee Dailey	2
Buick	Thonesen Racing	07	Gene Thonesen	6
Buick	Wawak Racing	74	Dennis DeVea	1
Buick	Whalen-Goularte Racing	17	Harry Goularte	6
Chevrolet	Barbara Walbridge	25	Mark Walbridge	3
Chevrolet	Hylton Motorsports	4	Trevor Boys	1
Chevrolet	Kord Racing	94	Bob Kennedy	9
Chevrolet	Rich Olson	28	Randy OIson	4
Chevrolet	Unknown	4	Mark Walbridge	1
Chrysler	Jim Danielsen	9	J. C. Danielsen	3
Dodge	Elder Racing	96	Ray Elder	1
Ford	Jefferson Racing	95	Derrike Cope	4
Pontiac	Boys Racing	48	Buddie Boys	3
Pontiac	Francis Race Cars	03	Glenn Francis	3
Pontiac	John Borneman	0	John Borneman	1
Pontiac	Ken McRay	8	Mel Larson	1
Pontiac	Mike Gustafson	0	Steve Pfeifer	2
Pontiac	Mike Gustafson	0	John Gustafson	1
Pontiac	Mike Gustafson	3	Steve Pfeifer	1
Pontiac	Mike Gustafson	3	John Soares Jr.	1
Pontiac	Miller Racing	51	Scott Miller	5
Pontiac	Terris Racing	32	Kevin Terris	1
Pontiac	Unknown	1	Roger Gannon	1
Buick 8 Dodge 1	Randy Becker	67	Randy Becker	9
Chevrolet 1 Chrysler 1	Davis Racing	22	St. James Davis	2
Pontiac 3 Oldsmobile 2	KC Racing	91	John Krebs	5

== Schedule and results ==
The 1983 season included 10 individual races, although Riverside International Raceway hosted three races. The first and third of these races were in combination with the NASCAR Winston Cup Series.

Date	Name	Racetrack	Location	Winner
May 14	Stockton Winston 150	Stockton 99 Speedway	Stockton, California	Jim Bown
May 22	Sears Point Winston 200	Sears Point International Raceway	Sonoma, California	Hershel McGriff
June 5	Budweiser 400	Riverside International Raceway	Riverside, California	Ricky Rudd
July 2	Yakima Winston 150	Yakima Speedway	Yakima, Washington	Ron Eaton
July 31	Winston Evergreen 200	Evergreen Speedway	Monroe, Washington	Jim Robinson
August 6	Mountain Dew 150	Shasta Speedway	Anderson, California	Jim Robinson
August 28	Warner W. Hodgdon 200	Riverside International Raceway	Riverside, California	Hershel McGriff
October 9	Coors 200	Caesars Palace	Las Vegas, Nevada	Jim Robinson
November 20	Winston Western 500	Riverside International Raceway	Riverside, California	Bill Elliott
November 27	Sands Chevrolet 250	Phoenix International Raceway	Avondale, Arizona	Ron Eaton

== Full Drivers' Championship ==
(key) Bold – Pole position awarded by time. Italics – Pole position set by owner's points. * – Most laps led. † – Ineligible for West Series points

Pos	Driver	S99	SON	RSD	YAK	EVG	SHA	RSD	CPL	RSD	PHO	Pts
1	Jim Robinson	2	6	11	5	1	1*	8	1	21	11	498
2	Bill Schmitt	4	13	9	3	3	**2**	3	2*	40	8	456
3	Hershel McGriff	6	1*	26	21	8	11	1*	24	8	10	438
4	Jim Bown	**1***	**14**	23	**4**	**13**	15	**4**	11	35	**4**	435
5	Don Waterman	5	11	20	7	9	8	11	4	25	7	435
6	Doug Wheeler	15	10	21	10	12	7	9	5	18	23	409
7	Pat Mintey	10	2	37	8	10	6	17	6	29	20	408
8	Sumner McKnight	17	5	15	13	19	4	10	21	19	6	407
9	Ron Esau	12	4	35	9	7	3	21	19	38	9	401
10	Bob Kennedy	18	7	19	11	20	13	7	13		15	378
11	Rick McCray	8	3	27	17	18	5	14	25	39	26	370
12	Randy Becker	11	12	36	14	11		5	20	15	25	346
13	Ron Eaton	3	17		1	4			**14**		1	286
14	Harry Goularte	14	20				10	6	3		3*	281
15	Gene Thonesen		9		16		9	13	8		17	234
16	Scott Miller			30				2	7	22	12	217
17	Dan Noble				6	16			10		16	183
18	Derrike Cope				2*	5*			12		5	180
19	John Krebs	13	15					20	27	32		170
20	Clive Skilton		19		20	22		22	28		27	168
21	Roy Smith					2		15	16	36		159
22	Steve Pfeifer		16			14		23				157
23	Mark Walbridge	9			12	6			23			154
24	Randy Olson						14	24	9		21	136
25	Mark Perry							19	17		14	133
26	Tim Kennell	16			22	21	16					129
27	Glenn Francis			14				18		28		124
28	Buddie Boys				18				26		19	90
29	J. C. Danielsen				19	17			29			88
30	St. James Davis							25			18	85
31	Lee Dailey				15	15						72
32	Trevor Boys										2	49
33	Ivan Baldwin	7										44
34	Gary Johnson		8									43
35	Roger Gannon						12					39
	Dennis DeVea										13	38
	Mel Larson								15			36
	Jimmy Insolo									42		35
	Earle Canavan								18			33
	John Gustafson		18									33
	Rick Becker										22	29
	John Soares Jr.								22			29
	John Borneman										24	27
	Kevin Terris							12				
	Ray Elder							16				

== See also ==
- 1983 NASCAR Winston Cup Series
- 1983 NASCAR Budweiser Late Model Sportsman Series
