= 1984 NASCAR Winston West Series =

31st season of the NASCAR Winston West Series

Seasons
- ← 1983 1985 →

The 1984 NASCAR Winston West Series was the 31st season of the series. The title was won by Jim Robinson, his second in the series and second in succession.

== Teams and drivers ==
=== Complete schedule ===
Manufacturer	Team	No.	Driver
Buick	Kieper Racing	98	Jim Bown
Buick	Lee Racing	56	Ron Esau
Buick	Stoke Racing	32	Ruben Garcia
Chevrolet	McKnight Racing	83	Sumner McKnight
Ford	Jefferson Racing	95	Derrike Cope
Oldsmobile	KC Racing	91	John Krebs
Oldsmobile	Lois Williams	78	Jim Robinson
Buick 10 Chevrolet 1	Go-En Racing	17	Harry Goularte
Chevrolet 10 Buick 1	Schmitt Racing	73	Bill Schmitt

=== Partial schedule ===
Manufacturer	Team	No.	Driver	Races
Buick	DiGard Motorsports	2	Bobby Allison	1
Buick	Don Waterman	38	Don Waterman	4
Buick	Eaton Racing	7	Ron Eaton	5
Buick	Gautsche Racing	82	Ron Gautsche	2
Buick	Hackman-Skilton Racing	94	Clive Skilton	5
Buick	Mike Brown	16	Doug Wheeler	1
Buick	Mike Brown	16	Bill Osborne	1
Buick	Stoner-Hurst Racing	86	Eldon Dotson	1
Buick	Terris Racing	13	Kevin Terris	2
Buick	Thonesen Racing	07	Gene Thonesen	5
Buick	Unknown	4	Roger Gannon	1
Buick	Unknown	37	Dan Noble	4
Buick	Unknown	88	Lee Dailey	1
Buick	Unknown	93	Jimmy Insolo	2
Chevrolet	Jolly Racing	31	Jerry Jolly	1
Chevrolet	Myunk Suk Lee	45	Bob Kennedy	9
Chevrolet	Osborne Racing	16	Bill Osborne	1
Chevrolet	Pat Mintey	35	Pat Mintey	10
Chevrolet	Rich Olson	28	Randy Olson	5
Chevrolet	Unknown	41	Kevin Terris	1
Chevrolet	Unknown	77	Tony Heckart	3
Chrysler	Jim Danielsen	9	J. C. Danielsen	1
Chrysler	St. James Racing	22	St. James Davis	9
Dodge	Unknown	96	Pappy Pryor	1
Ford	Jefferson Racing	5	Tim Richmond	1
Ford	Jefferson Racing	7	Kyle Petty	1
Ford	Langley Racing	64	Gary Mayeda	1
Oldsmobile	John & Terry Petris	12	Terry Petris	2
Oldsmobile	KC Racing	1	Steve Bare	1
Oldsmobile	Larry Gaylord	8	Larry Gaylord	1
Oldsmobile	Lejeune Engineering	44	Billy Hitchcox	1
Oldsmobile	Midgley Racing	71	Scott Autrey	6
Oldsmobile	Thirkettle Racing	5	Jim Thirkettle	1
Pontiac	Francis Race Cars	03	Glenn Francis	2
Pontiac	Gary Smith	04	Hershel McGriff	10
Pontiac	Gary Smith	43	Richard Petty	1
Pontiac	John Soares Jr.	94	John Soares Jr.	1
Pontiac	Jimmy Means Racing	52	Roy Smith	1
Pontiac	Miller Racing	51	Scott Miller	6
Pontiac	Unknown	2	John Soares Jr.	2
Buick 1 Pontiac 1	Boys Racing	24	Buddie Boys	2
Pontiac 5 Buick 1	McCray Racing	94	Rick McCray	6

== Schedule and results ==
The 1984 season included 11 individual races, although Riverside International Raceway hosted two races. Both of these races were in combination with the NASCAR Winston Cup Series.

Date	Name	Racetrack	Location	Winner
June 3	Budweiser 400	Riverside International Raceway	Riverside, California	Terry Labonte
June 30	Yakima Winston 150	Yakima Speedway	Yakima, Washington	Ron Eaton
July 8	Stroh's Beer 200	Seattle International Raceway	Kent, Washington	Jim Bown
July 15	Winston/Permatex 150	Portland Speedway	Portland, Oregon	Derrike Cope
July 29	Evergreen Winston 200	Evergreen Speedway	Monroe, Washington	Jim Robinson
August 4	Mountain Dew 150	Shasta Speedway	Anderson, California	Derrike Cope
September 30	MDB Systems/MD Spark Plugs 200	Willow Springs Speedway	Lancaster, California	Scott Miller
October 14	Winston/Sonoma 200	Sears Point International Raceway	Sonoma, California	Jim Bown
October 27	Suncrest Motorhomes 200	Mesa Marin Raceway	Bakersfield, California	Sumner McKnight
November 18	Winston Western 500	Riverside International Raceway	Riverside, California	Geoffrey Bodine
November 25	7-Eleven NASCAR 250	Phoenix International Raceway	Avondale, Arizona	Bill Schmitt

== Full Drivers' Championship ==
(key) Bold – Pole position awarded by time. Italics – Pole position set by owner's points. * – Most laps led. † – Ineligible for West Series points

Pos	Driver	RSD	YAK	SIR	POR	EVG	SHA	WSR	SON	MMR	RSD	PHO	Pts
1	Jim Robinson	14	2	3	3	1*	11	7	2	2*	29	2	530
2	Derrike Cope	15	9	5	1	2	1*	3	8	5	18	16	526
3	Sumner McKnight	25	4	14	4	5	3	6	6	1	19	6	512
4	Jim Bown	28	7	1*	11	13	2	20	1*	10	36	3	493
5	Ron Esau	27	3	6	6	4	7	2	19	**3**	27	5	492
6	Bill Schmitt	39	5	2	2	22	**10**	8	5	15	13	1*	484
7	Ruben Garcia	33	16	4	8	8	8	10	16	7	32	9	455
8	Harry Goularte	22	14	7	10	12	5	11	12	19	31	4	455
9	John Krebs	40	17	8	14	10	6	16	14	8	39	17	422
10	Hershel McGriff	35	8	**11**	18	**18**		5	**7**	20	9	10	410
11	Pat Mintey		15	15	13	6	4	19	13	12	DNQ	24	338
12	Bob Kennedy		11	13		20	12	14	9	11	DNQ	13	305
13	St. James Davis			22	17	15	14	17	18	21	DNQ	25	288
14	Scott Miller	36		12				**1***	4		35	8	268
15	Scott Autrey			10		11		13	17		DNQ	19	213
16	Rick McCray	30						4	3	13	37	DNQ	213
17	Clive Skilton		10	19	7	7	13						199
18	Ron Eaton		**1***	21	**9***	19						**22**	193
19	Randy Olson		12	20	16					4		11	192
20	Don Waterman		6	9	5	23							161
21	Gene Thonesen						9	12	15	18		DNQ	150
22	Dan Noble		13	16	12	14							149
23	Kevin Terris	24						18				15	146
24	Tony Heckart		18		15	9							111
25	Glenn Francis	16									DNQ		81
26	John Soares Jr.					16			10		DNQ		76
27	Buddie Boys		19									14	69
28	Terry Petris									17		20	65
29	Bill Osborne										DNQ	23	58
30	Billy Hitchcox					3							48
31	Jimmy Insolo									6		7	44
32	Roy Smith	26											44
33	Ron Gautsche									9		DNQ	42
34	Doug Wheeler							9					42
35	Steve Bare								11				40
36	Pappy Pryor											12	39
37	Gary Mayeda	37											37
38	Jerry Jolly	38											36
39	J. C. Danielsen							15					36
40	Kyle Petty	8†		17							28†		34
41	Lee Dailey					17							34
42	Eldon Dotson											18	33
43	Richard Petty	23†		18							14†		33
44	Bobby Allison	3†									7*†	21	30
45	Tim Richmond	6†									2†	26	25
	Roger Gannon									14			
	Jim Thirkettle									16			
	Larry Gaylord					21							
	Ronnie Thomas										DNQ		
	Buddy Arrington										DNQ		

== See also ==
- 1984 NASCAR Winston Cup Series
