= 1989 Coors 200 =

8th race of the 1989 NASCAR Winston West Series

Race details
- Race 8 of 11 in the 1989 NASCAR Winston West Series season
- Location: Mesa Marin Speedway in Bakersfield, California
- Course: Permanent racing facility
- Course length: 0.500 miles (0.805 km)
- Distance: 200 laps, 100.00 mi (160.93 km)
- Average speed: 73.514 miles per hour (118.309 km/h)

Pole position
Driver	Troy Beebe	Beebe Racing

Most laps led
Driver	Bill Schmitt	Schmitt Racing
- Laps: 128

Winner
No. 79	Roy Smith	Razore Racing

The 1989 Coors 200 was the eighth stock car race of the 1989 NASCAR Winston West Series season. The race was held on Saturday, August 5, 1989, at Mesa Marin Raceway, a 0.500 mile (0.805 km) oval shaped racetrack in Bakersfield, California. The race took the scheduled 200 laps to complete. Roy Smith won the race, his second and final win of the season. Smith, restarting sixth after the final caution after barely avoided losing a lap on pit road, passed pole sitter Troy Beebe and Bill Schmitt in the final laps en route to the win. Bill Sedgwick would finish second after Schmitt's brakes began to fail. Schmitt, Beebe, and Robert Sprague rounded out the top five.

== Report ==
=== Background ===
Mesa Marin Raceway was a 0.500 mi (0.805 km) paved oval race track, located near the junction of CA 178 and CA 184 (Kern Canyon Road), east of Bakersfield, California. It opened in 1977 and was owned by Marion Collins throughout its existence. The 1989 Coors 200 was one of 45 NASCAR Winston West Series races to be held at the track during its existence.

==== Entry list ====
No.	Driver	Owner	Manufacturer
03	Dave Mood	M.K. Kanke	Pontiac
04	Hershel McGriff	Hershel McGriff	Pontiac
07	Mark Walbridge	Unknown	Pontiac
08	Rick McCray	Rick McCray	Chevrolet
9	J.C. Danielsen	Larry Rouse	Ford
15	Rick Scribner	Rick Scribner	Chevrolet
19	Robert Sprague	Fred Stoke/Larry Rouse	Ford
22	St. James Davis	LaDonna Davis	Buick
24	Butch Gilliland	Butch Gilliland	Buick
28	Gary Collins	Marion Collins	Oldsmobile
38	Duke Hoenshell	Duke Hoenshell	Pontiac
41	Danny Lawson	Sara Vincent	Chevrolet
44	Jack Sellers	Adele Emerson	Buick
56	Ron Esau	Ron Esau	Oldsmobile
73	Bill Schmitt	Bill Schmitt	Chevrolet
75	Bill Sedgwick	Wayne Spears	Chevrolet
79	Roy Smith	Warren Razore	Ford
83	Sumner McKnight	Sumner McKnight	Ford
88	Bob Walker	Bob Walker	Pontiac
89	Bob Howard	Tom Hathaway	Oldsmobile
93	Troy Beebe	Troy Beebe	Buick
98	Jerry Bowers	John Kieper	Chevrolet
99	John Krebs	John Krebs	Pontiac

== Qualifying ==
Troy Beebe won the pole with a speed of 92.44 mph. Jerry Bowers withdrew from the event.

== Race results ==
Fin	St	#	Driver	Owner	Make	Laps	Led	Status	Pts
1	6	79	Roy Smith	Warren Razore	Ford	200	29	Running	180
2	3	75	Bill Sedgwick	Wayne Spears	Chevrolet	200	25	Running	175
3	2	73	Bill Schmitt	Bill Schmitt	Chevrolet	200	128	Running	175
4	1	93	Troy Beebe	Troy Beebe	Buick	200	0	Running	160
5	16	19	Robert Sprague	Fred Stoke/Larry Rouse	Ford	198	0	Running	155
6	8	99	John Krebs	John Krebs	Pontiac	197	2	Running	155
7	9	56	Ron Esau	Ron Esau	Oldsmobile	196	0	Running	146
8	14	08	Rick McCray	Rick McCray	Chevrolet	195	0	Running	142
9	5	04	Hershel McGriff	Hershel McGriff	Pontiac	195	0	Running	138
10	13	88	Bob Walker	Bob Walker	Pontiac	195	0	Running	134
11	11	9	J.C. Danielsen	Larry Rouse	Ford	194	0	Running	130
12	15	44	Jack Sellers	Adele Emerson	Buick	172	0	Running	127
13	10	83	Sumner McKnight	Sumner McKnight	Ford	155	16	Accident	129
14	17	15	Rick Scribner	Rick Scribner	Chevrolet	140	0	Engine	121
15	4	28	Gary Collins	Marion Collins	Oldsmobile	122	0	Engine	118
16	18	41	Danny Lawson	Sara Vincent	Chevrolet	111	0	Handling	115
17	7	38	Duke Hoenshell	Duke Hoenshell	Pontiac	107	0	Handling	112
18	12	07	Mark Walbridge	Unknown	Pontiac	57	0	Handling	109
19	20	89	Bob Howard	Tom Hathaway	Oldsmobile	6	0	Engine	106`
20	19	22	St. James Davis	LaDonna Davis	Buick	3	0	Oil Pump	103
21	22	03	Dave Mood	M.K. Kanke	Pontiac	2	0	Handling	100
22	21	24	Butch Gilliland	Butch Gilliland	Buick	0	0	Engine	97

== Standings after the race ==
	Pos	Driver	Points
	1	Bill Schmitt	1325
	2	Roy Smith	1324 (-1)
	3	Hershel McGriff	1221 (-104)
	4	Rick McCray	1176 (-149)
	5	Bill Sedgwick	1139 (-186)
	6	John Krebs	1110 (-215)
2	7	Robert Sprague	922 (-403)
1	8	Jerry Bowers	920 (-405)
1	9	Butch Gilliland	893 (-432)
	10	Jack Sellers	870 (-455)

- Note: Only the first 10 positions are included for the driver standings.

Previous race: 1989 Motorcraft 500	NASCAR Winston West Series; 1989 season	Next race: 1989 Winston 200
