= 1989 Budweiser 200 =

1st race of the 1989 NASCAR Winston West Series

Race details
- Race 1 of 11 in the 1989 NASCAR Winston West Series season
- Location: Madera Speedway in Madera, California
- Course: Permanent racing facility
- Course length: 0.333 miles (0.536 km)
- Distance: 200 laps, 66.60 mi (107.18 km)
- Average speed: 65.058 miles per hour (104.701 km/h)

Pole position
Driver	Bill Sedgwick	Spears Motorsports

Most laps led
Driver	Bill Sedgwick	Spears Motorsports
- Laps: 118

Winner
No. 75	Bill Sedgwick	Spears Motorsports

The 1989 Budweiser 200 was the first stock car race of the 1989 NASCAR Winston West Series season. The race was held on Sunday, April 30, 1989, at Madera Speedway, a 0.333 mile (0.536 km) oval shaped racetrack in Madera, California. The race took the scheduled 200 laps to complete. Bill Sedgwick won the race, his first of the season and the first of his career. Sedgwick won by one second over Roy Smith. Sedgwick took the lead for the final time on the 127th lap, passing Hershel McGriff. McGriff, fighting through a handling problem in the final 50 laps, would finish third, and Bill Schmitt and Butch Gilliland rounded out the top five.

== Report ==
=== Background ===
Madera Speedway is a 0.333 mile (0.536 km) oval race track located in Madera, California. It was built in 1971.

==== Entry list ====
No.	Driver	Owner	Manufacturer
04	Hershel McGriff	Hershel McGriff	Chevrolet
08	Rick McCray	Rick McCray	Pontiac
22	St. James Davis	LaDonna Davis	Buick
24	Butch Gilliland	Butch Gilliland	Buick
41	Keith Van Houten	Sara Vincent	Chevrolet
44	Jack Sellers	Adele Emerson	Buick
56	Ron Esau	Ron Esau	Oldsmobile
65	Robert Sprague	Unknown	Ford
73	Bill Schmitt	Bill Schmitt	Chevrolet
75	Bill Sedgwick	Wayne Spears	Chevrolet
79	Roy Smith	Warren Razore	Ford
82	J.C. Danielsen	Shirnell Gautsche	Buick
83	Sumner McKnight	Sumner McKnight	Ford
88	Bob Walker	Bob Walker	Pontiac
98	Jerry Bowers	John Kieper	Chevrolet
99	John Krebs	John Krebs	Pontiac

== Qualifying ==
Bill Sedgwick won the pole with a speed of 80.591 mph.

== Race results ==
Fin	St	#	Driver	Owner	Make	Laps	Led	Status	Pts
1	1	75	Bill Sedgwick	Wayne Spears	Chevrolet	200	118	Running	185
2	6	79	Roy Smith	Warren Razore	Ford	200	0	Running	170
3	2	04	Hershel McGriff	Hershel McGriff	Pontiac	200	82	Running	170
4	10	73	Bill Schmitt	Bill Schmitt	Chevrolet	200	0	Running	160
5	12	24	Butch Gilliland	Butch Gilliland	Buick	200	0	Running	155
6	5	98	Jerry Bowers	John Kieper	Chevrolet	199	0	Running	150
7	3	83	Sumner McKnight	Sumner McKnight	Ford	198	0	Running	146
8	8	82	J.C. Danielsen	Shirnell Gautsche	Buick	198	0	Running	142
9	9	99	John Krebs	John Krebs	Pontiac	195	0	Running	138
10	15	44	Jack Sellers	Adele Emerson	Buick	192	0	Running	134
11	14	88	Bob Walker	Bob Walker	Pontiac	188	0	Running	130
12	4	41	Keith Van Houten	Sara Vincent	Chevrolet	167	0	Brakes	127
13	16	22	St. James Davis	LaDonna Davis	Buick	165	0	Flat Tire	124
14	11	65	Robert Sprague	Unknown	Ford	131	0	Running	121
15	7	08	Rick McCray	Rick McCray	Pontiac	77	0	Engine	118
16	13	56	Ron Esau	Ron Esau	Oldsmobile	62	0	Handling	115

== Standings after the race ==
Pos	Driver	Points
1	Bill Sedgwick	185
2	Roy Smith	170 (-15)
3	Hershel McGriff	170 (-15)
4	Bill Schmitt	160 (-25)
5	Butch Gilliland	155 (-30)
6	Jerry Bowers	150 (-35)
7	Sumner McKnight	146 (-39)
8	J.C. Danielsen	142 (-43)
9	John Krebs	138 (-47)
10	Jack Sellers	134 (-51)

- Note: Only the first 10 positions are included for the driver standings.

Previous race: 1988 Checker 500	NASCAR Winston West Series; 1989 season	Next race: 1989 Spears Manufacturing 200
