= 1989 Winston 200 (Saugus, California) =

9th race of the 1989 NASCAR Winston West Series

Race details
- Race 9 of 11 in the 1989 NASCAR Winston West Series season
- Date: August 12, 1989
- Location: Saugus Speedway in Saugus, California
- Course: Permanent racing facility
- Course length: 0.333 miles (0.536 km)
- Distance: 200 laps, 66.600 mi (107.182 km)
- Average speed: 58.494 miles per hour (94.137 km/h)
- Attendance: 5000

Pole position
Driver	Hershel McGriff	McGriff Motorsports

Most laps led
Driver	Bill Sedgwick	Spears Motorsports
- Laps: 103

Winner
No. 75	Bill Sedgwick	Spears Motorsports

The 1989 Winston 200 was the ninth stock car race of the 1989 NASCAR Winston West Series season. The race was held on Saturday, August 12, 1989, at Saugus Speedway, a 1/3 mile (0.536 km) oval shaped racetrack in Saugus, California. The race took the scheduled 200 laps to complete. Bill Sedgwick won the race, his third and final win of the season. Sedgwick held on to the lead over Hershel McGriff despite smoke seeping from his car with six laps remaining. McGriff finished second, with Roy Smith, Bill Schmitt, and Rick McCray rounding out the top five.

== Report ==
=== Background ===
Saugus Speedway was a 1/3 mile racetrack in Saugus, Santa Clarita, California. The track started out as a rodeo arena called Baker Ranch Stadium in 1927. It hosted the Winston West Series multiple times, as well as hosting a NASCAR Craftsman Truck Series race in 1995, the final year the track was used for racing.

==== Entry list ====
No.	Driver	Owner	Manufacturer
03	Dave Mood	M.K. Kanke	Pontiac
04	Hershel McGriff	Hershel McGriff	Pontiac
08	Rick McCray	Rick McCray	Chevrolet
19	Robert Sprague	Fred Stoke/Larry Rouse	Ford
22	St. James Davis	LaDonna Davis	Buick
24	Butch Gilliland	Butch Gilliland	Buick
38	Duke Hoenshell	Duke Hoenshell	Pontiac
41	Ron Hornaday Jr.	Sara Vincent	Chevrolet
44	Jack Sellers	Adele Emerson	Buick
63	Walt Price	M.K. Kanke	Chevrolet
73	Bill Schmitt	Bill Schmitt	Chevrolet
75	Bill Sedgwick	Wayne Spears	Chevrolet
79	Roy Smith	Warren Razore	Ford
88	Bob Walker	Bob Walker	Pontiac
99	John Krebs	John Krebs	Pontiac

== Qualifying ==
Hershel McGriff won the pole with a speed of 72.860 mph.

== Race results ==
Fin	St	#	Driver	Owner	Make	Laps	Led	Status	Pts
1	6	75	Bill Sedgwick	Wayne Spears	Chevrolet	200	103	Running	185
2	1	04	Hershel McGriff	Hershel McGriff	Pontiac	200	89	Running	175
3	4	79	Roy Smith	Warren Razore	Ford	200	0	Running	165
4	2	73	Bill Schmitt	Bill Schmitt	Chevrolet	200	0	Running	160
5	12	08	Rick McCray	Rick McCray	Chevrolet	199	0	Running	155
6	5	38	Duke Hoenshell	Duke Hoenshell	Pontiac	198	0	Running	150
7	8	99	John Krebs	John Krebs	Pontiac	182	8	Engine	151
8	11	44	Jack Sellers	Adele Emerson	Buick	172	0	Running	142
9	3	24	Butch Gilliland	Butch Gilliland	Buick	156	0	Running	138
10	10	19	Robert Sprague	Fred Stoke/Larry Rouse	Ford	131	0	Rear End	134
11	7	88	Bob Walker	Bob Walker	Pontiac	128	0	Rear End	130
12	9	41	Ron Hornaday Jr.	Sara Vincent	Chevrolet	47	0	Oil Leak	127
13	13	22	St. James Davis	LaDonna Davis	Buick	7	0	Engine	124
14	15	63	Walt Price	M.K. Kanke	Chevrolet	4	0	Engine	121
15	14	03	Dave Mood	M.K. Kanke	Pontiac	1	0	Overheating	118

== Standings after the race ==
	Pos	Driver	Points
1	1	Roy Smith	1489
1	2	Bill Schmitt	1485 (-4)
	3	Hershel McGriff	1396 (-93)
	4	Rick McCray	1331 (-158)
	5	Bill Sedgwick	1324 (-165)
	6	John Krebs	1261 (-228)
	7	Robert Sprague	1056 (-433)
1	8	Butch Gilliland	1031 (-458)
1	9	Jack Sellers	1012 (-477)
2	10	Bob Walker	979 (-510)

- Note: Only the first 10 positions are included for the driver standings.

Previous race: 1989 Coors 200	NASCAR Winston West Series; 1989 season	Next race: 1989 Winston 200
