= 1989 Banquet Frozen Foods 300 =

12th race of the 1989 NASCAR Winston Cup Series

Race details
- Race 12 of 29 in the 1989 NASCAR Winston Cup Series; Race 4 of 11 in the 1989 NASCAR Winston West Series
- The 1989 Banquet Frozen Foods 300 program cover, featuring Rick Mast.
- Date: June 11, 1989
- Official name: Inaugural Banquet Frozen Foods 300
- Location: Sears Point International Raceway, Sonoma, California
- Course: Permanent racing facility
- Course length: 2.52 miles (4.06 km)
- Distance: 74 laps, 186.48 mi (300.11 km)
- Scheduled distance: 74 laps, 186.48 mi (300.11 km)
- Average speed: 76.088 miles per hour (122.452 km/h)
- Attendance: 53,000

Pole position
Driver	Rusty Wallace	Blue Max Racing
- Time: 1:40.754

Most laps led
Driver	Ricky Rudd	King Racing
- Laps: 61

Winner
No. 26	Ricky Rudd	King Racing

Television in the United States
- Network: ESPN
- Announcers: Bob Jenkins, Ned Jarrett, Benny Parsons

Radio in the United States
- Radio: Motor Racing Network

The 1989 Banquet Frozen Foods 300 was the 12th stock car race of the 1989 NASCAR Winston Cup Series season, the fourth race of the 1989 NASCAR Winston West Series, and the inaugural iteration of the event. The race was held on Sunday, June 11, 1989, before an audience of 62,000 in Sonoma, California, at the Grand Prix layout of Sears Point Raceway, a 2.52 miles (4.06 km) permanent road course layout. The race took the scheduled 74 laps to complete. In the final laps of the race, King Racing driver Ricky Rudd would manage to fend off a charge from Blue Max Racing driver Rusty Wallace for the final four laps to take his 10th career NASCAR Winston Cup Series victory and his only victory of the season. To fill out the top three, the aforementioned Rusty Wallace and Melling Racing driver Bill Elliott would finish second and third, respectively.

== Background ==
The layout of Sears International Point Raceway used by NASCAR at the time.

Sears International Point Raceway is one of two road courses to hold NASCAR races, the other being Watkins Glen International. The standard road course at Sears Point Raceway is a 12-turn course that is 2.52 miles (4.06 km) long; the track was modified in 1998, adding the Chute, which bypassed turns 5 and 6, shortening the course to 1.95 miles (3.14 km). The Chute was only used for NASCAR events such as this race, and was criticized by many drivers, who preferred the full layout. In 2001, it was replaced with a 70-degree turn, 4A, bringing the track to its current dimensions of 1.99 miles (3.20 km).

=== Entry list ===
- (R) denotes rookie driver.

#	Driver	Team	Make
2	Ernie Irvan	U.S. Racing	Pontiac
3	Dale Earnhardt	Richard Childress Racing	Chevrolet
4	Rick Wilson	Morgan–McClure Motorsports	Oldsmobile
04	Hershel McGriff	McGriff Motorsports	Pontiac
5	Geoff Bodine	Hendrick Motorsports	Chevrolet
6	Mark Martin	Roush Racing	Ford
7	Alan Kulwicki	AK Racing	Ford
8	Bobby Hillin Jr.	Stavola Brothers Racing	Buick
08	Rick McCray	McCray Racing	Pontiac
9	Bill Elliott	Melling Racing	Ford
09	Terry Fisher	Midgley Racing	Chevrolet
11	Terry Labonte	Junior Johnson & Associates	Ford
15	Brett Bodine	Bud Moore Engineering	Ford
16	Larry Pearson (R)	Pearson Racing	Buick
17	Darrell Waltrip	Hendrick Motorsports	Chevrolet
19	Bill Cooper	Stoke Racing	Ford
21	Neil Bonnett	Wood Brothers Racing	Ford
23	Eddie Bierschwale	B&B Racing	Oldsmobile
25	Ken Schrader	Hendrick Motorsports	Chevrolet
26	Ricky Rudd	King Racing	Buick
27	Rusty Wallace	Blue Max Racing	Pontiac
28	Davey Allison	Robert Yates Racing	Ford
29	Dale Jarrett	Cale Yarborough Motorsports	Pontiac
30	Michael Waltrip	Bahari Racing	Pontiac
33	Harry Gant	Jackson Bros. Motorsports	Oldsmobile
38	Dick Johnson	Dick Johnson Racing	Ford
40	Darin Brassfield	Brassfield Racing	Chevrolet
41	Jim Bown	Bown Racing	Chevrolet
43	Richard Petty	Petty Enterprises	Pontiac
44	Jack Sellers	Emerson Racing	Buick
46	Marta Leonard	Leonard Racing	Chevrolet
52	Jimmy Means	Jimmy Means Racing	Pontiac
55	Phil Parsons	Jackson Bros. Motorsports	Oldsmobile
56	Ron Esau	Esau Racing	Oldsmobile
57	Hut Stricklin (R)	Osterlund Racing	Pontiac
71	Dave Marcis	Marcis Auto Racing	Chevrolet
73	Bill Schmitt	Schmitt Racing	Chevrolet
75	Morgan Shepherd	RahMoc Enterprises	Pontiac
76	Bill Sedgwick	Spears Motorsports	Buick
79	Roy Smith	Razore Racing	Ford
80	Bob Walker	Bob Walker Racing	Pontiac
83	Lake Speed	Speed Racing	Oldsmobile
84	Dick Trickle (R)	Stavola Brothers Racing	Buick
88	Joe Ruttman	Baker–Schiff Racing	Pontiac
90	Stan Barrett	Donlavey Racing	Ford
93	Troy Beebe	Beebe Racing	Buick
94	Sterling Marlin	Hagan Racing	Oldsmobile
99	John Krebs	Krebs Racing	Pontiac

== Qualifying ==
Qualifying was split into two rounds. The first round was held on Friday, June 9, at 4:00 PM EST. Each driver would have one lap to set a time. During the first round, the top 25 drivers in the round would be guaranteed a starting spot in the race. If a driver was not able to guarantee a spot in the first round, they had the option to scrub their time from the first round and try and run a faster lap time in a second round qualifying run, held on Saturday, June 10, at 1:00 PM EST. As with the first round, each driver would have one lap to set a time. For this specific race, positions 26-40 would be decided on time, and depending on who needed it, a select amount of positions were given to cars who had not otherwise qualified but were high enough in owner's points; which was two for entries in the NASCAR Winston Cup Series and two extra provisionals for the NASCAR Winston West Series.

Rusty Wallace, driving for Blue Max Racing, would win the pole, setting a time of 1:40.754 and an average speed of 90.041 miles per hour (144.907 km/h) in the first round.

Six drivers would fail to qualify.

=== Full qualifying results ===
Pos.	#	Driver	Team	Make	Time	Speed
1	27	Rusty Wallace	Blue Max Racing	Pontiac	1:40.754	90.041
2	6	Mark Martin	Roush Racing	Ford	1:40.774	90.023
3	9	Bill Elliott	Melling Racing	Ford	1:40.802	89.998
4	26	Ricky Rudd	King Racing	Buick	1:40.849	89.956
5	25	Ken Schrader	Hendrick Motorsports	Chevrolet	1:41.267	89.585
6	17	Darrell Waltrip	Hendrick Motorsports	Chevrolet	1:41.333	89.527
7	7	Alan Kulwicki	AK Racing	Ford	1:41.494	89.385
8	5	Geoff Bodine	Hendrick Motorsports	Chevrolet	1:41.567	89.320
9	75	Morgan Shepherd	RahMoc Enterprises	Pontiac	1:41.906	89.023
10	3	Dale Earnhardt	Richard Childress Racing	Chevrolet	1:41.940	88.994
11	38	Dick Johnson	Dick Johnson Racing	Ford	1:42.251	88.723
12	88	Joe Ruttman	Baker–Schiff Racing	Oldsmobile	1:42.294	88.686
13	33	Harry Gant	Jackson Bros. Motorsports	Oldsmobile	1:42.394	88.599
14	41	Jim Bown	Bown Racing	Chevrolet	1:42.427	88.570
15	28	Davey Allison	Robert Yates Racing	Ford	1:42.428	88.570
16	4	Rick Wilson	Morgan–McClure Motorsports	Oldsmobile	1:42.571	88.446
17	94	Sterling Marlin	Hagan Racing	Oldsmobile	1:42.612	88.411
18	21	Neil Bonnett	Wood Brothers Racing	Ford	1:43.134	87.963
19	8	Bobby Hillin Jr.	Stavola Brothers Racing	Buick	1:43.184	87.921
20	15	Brett Bodine	Bud Moore Engineering	Ford	1:43.209	87.899
21	84	Dick Trickle	Stavola Brothers Racing	Buick	1:43.584	87.581
22	16	Larry Pearson	Pearson Racing	Buick	1:43.596	87.571
23	55	Phil Parsons	Jackson Bros. Motorsports	Oldsmobile	1:43.794	87.404
24	09	Terry Fisher	Midgley Racing	Chevrolet	1:43.841	87.364
25	19	Bill Cooper	Stoke Racing	Ford	1:43.842	87.363
Failed to lock in Round 1
26	83	Lake Speed	Speed Racing	Oldsmobile	1:40.963	89.555
27	11	Terry Labonte	Junior Johnson & Associates	Ford	1:42.306	88.675
28	30	Michael Waltrip	Bahari Racing	Pontiac	1:42.633	88.393
29	2	Ernie Irvan	U.S. Racing	Pontiac	1:42.842	88.213
30	40	Darin Brassfield	Brassfield Racing	Chevrolet	1:43.094	87.997
31	04	Hershel McGriff	McGriff Motorsports	Pontiac	1:43.139	87.959
32	93	Troy Beebe	Beebe Racing	Buick	1:43.818	87.384
33	29	Dale Jarrett	Cale Yarborough Motorsports	Ford	1:43.904	87.311
34	57	Hut Stricklin	Osterlund Racing	Pontiac	1:43.936	87.284
35	71	Dave Marcis	Marcis Auto Racing	Chevrolet	1:41.001	87.230
36	73	Bill Schmitt	Schmitt Racing	Chevrolet	1:41.142	87.112
37	79	Roy Smith	Razore Racing	Ford	1:41.216	87.050
38	43	Richard Petty	Petty Enterprises	Pontiac	1:41.268	87.007
39	56	Ron Esau	Esau Racing	Oldsmobile	1:41.730	86.623
40	08	Rick McCray	McCray Racing	Pontiac	1:41.862	86.524
Winston Cup provisional
41	23	Eddie Bierschwale	B&B Racing	Oldsmobile	1:46.730	85.000
Winston West provisional
42	99	John Krebs	Krebs Racing	Pontiac	1:46.071	85.528
Failed to qualify
43	76	Bill Sedgwick	Spears Motorsports	Buick	-*	-*
44	52	Jimmy Means	Jimmy Means Racing	Pontiac	-*	-*
45	44	Jack Sellers	Emerson Racing	Buick	-*	-*
46	80	Bob Walker	Bob Walker Racing	Pontiac	-*	-*
47	90	Stan Barrett	Donlavey Racing	Ford	-*	-*
48	46	Marta Leonard	Leonard Racing	Chevrolet	-*	-*
Official first round qualifying results
Official starting lineup

== Race results ==
Fin	St	#	Driver	Team	Make	Laps	Led	Status	Pts	Winnings
1	4	26	Ricky Rudd	King Racing	Buick	74	61	running	185	$62,350
2	1	27	Rusty Wallace	Blue Max Racing	Pontiac	74	10	running	175	$39,225
3	3	9	Bill Elliott	Melling Racing	Ford	74	3	running	170	$28,375
4	10	3	Dale Earnhardt	Richard Childress Racing	Chevrolet	74	0	running	160	$20,350
5	26	83	Lake Speed	Speed Racing	Oldsmobile	74	0	running	155	$18,507
6	12	88	Joe Ruttman	Baker–Schiff Racing	Oldsmobile	74	0	running	150	$11,350
7	9	75	Morgan Shepherd	RahMoc Enterprises	Pontiac	74	0	running	146	$16,575
8	16	4	Rick Wilson	Morgan–McClure Motorsports	Oldsmobile	74	0	running	142	$10,075
9	15	28	Davey Allison	Robert Yates Racing	Ford	74	0	running	138	$13,875
10	28	30	Michael Waltrip	Bahari Racing	Pontiac	74	0	running	134	$11,600
11	18	21	Neil Bonnett	Wood Brothers Racing	Ford	74	0	running	130	$8,475
12	13	33	Harry Gant	Jackson Bros. Motorsports	Oldsmobile	74	0	running	127	$11,175
13	19	8	Bobby Hillin Jr.	Stavola Brothers Racing	Buick	74	0	running	124	$7,775
14	31	04	Hershel McGriff	McGriff Motorsports	Pontiac	74	0	running	0	$5,075
15	27	11	Terry Labonte	Junior Johnson & Associates	Ford	73	0	running	118	$10,675
16	35	71	Dave Marcis	Marcis Auto Racing	Chevrolet	73	0	running	115	$6,200
17	36	73	Bill Schmitt	Schmitt Racing	Chevrolet	73	0	running	0	$3,925
18	23	55	Phil Parsons	Jackson Bros. Motorsports	Oldsmobile	73	0	running	109	$5,800
19	22	16	Larry Pearson	Pearson Racing	Buick	73	0	running	106	$4,475
20	8	5	Geoff Bodine	Hendrick Motorsports	Chevrolet	73	0	running	103	$10,675
21	34	57	Hut Stricklin	Osterlund Racing	Pontiac	73	0	running	100	$2,925
22	30	40	Darin Brassfield	Brassfield Racing	Chevrolet	73	0	running	97	$2,650
23	29	2	Ernie Irvan	U.S. Racing	Pontiac	73	0	running	94	$3,475
24	32	93	Troy Beebe	Beebe Racing	Buick	72	0	running	0	$2,605
25	24	09	Terry Fisher	Midgley Racing	Chevrolet	72	0	running	0	$2,825
26	38	43	Richard Petty	Petty Enterprises	Pontiac	72	0	running	85	$3,345
27	20	15	Brett Bodine	Bud Moore Engineering	Ford	72	0	running	82	$5,275
28	40	08	Rick McCray	McCray Racing	Pontiac	72	0	running	0	$3,200
29	14	41	Jim Bown	Bown Racing	Chevrolet	70	0	running	0	$2,215
30	21	84	Dick Trickle	Stavola Brothers Racing	Buick	69	0	running	73	$5,200
31	2	6	Mark Martin	Roush Racing	Ford	69	0	running	70	$6,825
32	11	38	Dick Johnson	Dick Johnson Racing	Ford	65	0	running	67	$2,425
33	42	99	John Krebs	Krebs Racing	Pontiac	65	0	running	0	$3,000
34	41	23	Eddie Bierschwale	B&B Racing	Oldsmobile	63	0	engine	61	$2,375
35	25	19	Bill Cooper	Stoke Racing	Ford	61	0	engine	0	$2,360
36	7	7	Alan Kulwicki	AK Racing	Ford	55	0	engine	55	$4,330
37	5	25	Ken Schrader	Hendrick Motorsports	Chevrolet	47	0	running	52	$9,520
38	6	17	Darrell Waltrip	Hendrick Motorsports	Chevrolet	47	0	running	49	$10,900
39	37	79	Roy Smith	Razore Racing	Ford	46	0	engine	0	$3,375
40	17	94	Sterling Marlin	Hagan Racing	Oldsmobile	33	0	engine	43	$4,250
41	39	56	Ron Esau	Esau Racing	Oldsmobile	15	0	ignition	0	$2,250
42	33	29	Dale Jarrett	Cale Yarborough Motorsports	Ford	8	0	transmission	37	$4,250
Official race results

== Standings after the race ==
Drivers' Championship standings

	Pos	Driver	Points
1	1	Dale Earnhardt	1,775
1	2	Darrell Waltrip	1,666 (-109)
2	3	Rusty Wallace	1,648 (-127)
	4	Geoff Bodine	1,637 (–138)
2	5	Mark Martin	1,613 (–162)
4	6	Bill Elliott	1,523 (–252)
1	7	Alan Kulwicki	1,513 (–262)
1	8	Sterling Marlin	1,502 (–273)
	9	Davey Allison	1,496 (–279)
1	10	Ricky Rudd	1,486 (–289)
Official driver's standings

- Note: Only the first 10 positions are included for the driver standings.

Previous race: 1989 Budweiser 500	NASCAR Winston Cup Series; 1989 season	Next race: 1989 Miller High Life 500

Previous race: 1989 Bank of Loleta/U.S. Bank 200	NASCAR Winston West Series; 1989 season	Next race: 1989 Winston 200
