= 1990 Banquet Frozen Foods 300 =

12th race of the 1990 NASCAR Winston Cup Series

Race details
- Race 12 of 29 in the 1990 NASCAR Winston Cup Series
- The 1990 Banquet Frozen Foods 300 program cover, featuring Butch Miller.
- Date: June 10, 1990
- Official name: 2nd Annual Banquet Frozen Foods 300
- Location: Sears Point International Raceway, Sonoma, California
- Course: Permanent racing facility
- Course length: 2.52 miles (4.06 km)
- Distance: 74 laps, 186.48 mi (300.11 km)
- Average speed: 69.245 miles per hour (111.439 km/h)
- Attendance: 62,000

Pole position
Driver	Ricky Rudd	Hendrick Motorsports
- Time: 1:39.743

Most laps led
Driver	Rusty Wallace	Blue Max Racing
- Laps: 42

Winner
No. 27	Rusty Wallace	Blue Max Racing

Television in the United States
- Network: ESPN
- Announcers: Bob Jenkins, Ned Jarrett, Benny Parsons

Radio in the United States
- Radio: Motor Racing Network

The 1990 Banquet Frozen Foods 300 was the 12th stock car race of the 1990 NASCAR Winston Cup Series season, the second race of the 1990 NASCAR Winston West Series season, and the second iteration of the event. The race was held on Sunday, June 10, 1990, before an audience of 62,000 at the Grand Prix layout of Sears Point Raceway, a 2.52 miles (4.06 km) permanent road course layout. The race took the scheduled 74 laps to complete. At race's end, Blue Max Racing driver Rusty Wallace would manage to dominate a majority of the race to take his 18th career NASCAR Winston Cup Series victory and his second and final victory of the season. To fill out the top three, Roush Racing driver Mark Martin and Hendrick Motorsports driver Ricky Rudd would finish second and third, respectively.

== Background ==
The layout of Sears Point Raceway used by NASCAR at the time.

Sears Point Raceway is one of two road courses to hold NASCAR races, the other being Watkins Glen International. The standard road course at Sears Point Raceway is a 12-turn course that is 2.52 miles (4.06 km) long; the track was modified in 1998, adding the Chute, which bypassed turns 5 and 6, shortening the course to 1.95 miles (3.14 km). The Chute was only used for NASCAR events such as this race, and was criticized by many drivers, who preferred the full layout. In 2001, it was replaced with a 70-degree turn, 4A, bringing the track to its current dimensions of 1.99 miles (3.20 km).

=== Entry list ===
- (R) denotes rookie driver.

#	Driver	Team	Make
0	Irv Hoerr	Precision Products Racing	Oldsmobile
1	Terry Labonte	Precision Products Racing	Oldsmobile
2	Jim Bown	U.S. Racing	Pontiac
3	Dale Earnhardt	Richard Childress Racing	Chevrolet
03	Mike Hickingbottom	Hickingbottom Racing	Pontiac
4	Ernie Irvan	Morgan–McClure Motorsports	Oldsmobile
04	Hershel McGriff	Lipseia Racing	Pontiac
5	Ricky Rudd	Hendrick Motorsports	Chevrolet
6	Mark Martin	Roush Racing	Ford
7	Alan Kulwicki	AK Racing	Ford
8	Bobby Hillin Jr.	Stavola Brothers Racing	Buick
9	Bill Elliott	Melling Racing	Ford
09	Terry Fisher	Midgley Racing	Pontiac
10	Derrike Cope	Whitcomb Racing	Chevrolet
11	Geoff Bodine	Junior Johnson & Associates	Ford
12	Hut Stricklin	Bobby Allison Motorsports	Buick
15	Morgan Shepherd	Bud Moore Engineering	Ford
17	Darrell Waltrip	Hendrick Motorsports	Chevrolet
18	Stan Barrett	Hendrick Motorsports	Chevrolet
19	Chad Little	Little Racing	Ford
20	Rob Moroso (R)	Moroso Racing	Oldsmobile
21	Dale Jarrett	Wood Brothers Racing	Ford
22	St. James Davis	St. James Racing	Buick
23	Mike Chase	Freymiller Racing	Buick
24	Butch Gilliland	Gilliland Racing	Chevrolet
25	Ken Schrader	Hendrick Motorsports	Chevrolet
26	Brett Bodine	King Racing	Buick
27	Rusty Wallace	Blue Max Racing	Pontiac
28	Davey Allison	Robert Yates Racing	Ford
30	Michael Waltrip	Bahari Racing	Pontiac
33	Harry Gant	Leo Jackson Motorsports	Oldsmobile
34	Ted Kennedy	Emerson Racing	Oldsmobile
40	Tommy Kendall	Reno Enterprises	Chevrolet
42	Kyle Petty	SABCO Racing	Pontiac
43	Richard Petty	Petty Enterprises	Pontiac
44	Jack Sellers	Emerson Racing	Buick
52	Jimmy Means	Jimmy Means Racing	Pontiac
57	Jimmy Spencer	Osterlund Racing	Pontiac
66	Dick Trickle	Cale Yarborough Motorsports	Pontiac
71	Dave Marcis	Marcis Auto Racing	Chevrolet
73	Bill Schmitt	Schmitt Racing	Chevrolet
75	Rick Wilson	RahMoc Enterprises	Pontiac
76	Bill Sedgwick	Spears Motorsports	Chevrolet
84	J. C. Danielsen	Danielsen Racing	Ford
93	Troy Beebe	Beebe Racing	Buick
94	Sterling Marlin	Hagan Racing	Oldsmobile
98	Butch Miller	Travis Carter Enterprises	Chevrolet
99	John Krebs	KC Racing	Pontiac

== Qualifying ==
Qualifying was split into two rounds. The first round was held on Friday, June 8, at 4:00 PM EST. Each driver would have one lap to set a time. During the first round, the top 25 drivers in the round would be guaranteed a starting spot in the race. If a driver was not able to guarantee a spot in the first round, they had the option to scrub their time from the first round and try and run a faster lap time in a second round qualifying run, held on Saturday, June 9, at 1:00 PM EST. As with the first round, each driver would have one lap to set a time. For this specific race, positions 26-40 would be decided on time, and depending on who needed it, a select amount of positions were given to cars who had not otherwise qualified but were high enough in owner's points; which was two for cars in the NASCAR Winston Cup Series and two extra provisionals for the NASCAR Winston West Series.

Ricky Rudd, driving for Hendrick Motorsports, would win the pole, setting a time of 1:39.743 and an average speed of 90.954 miles per hour (146.376 km/h) in the first round.

Four drivers would fail to qualify:Jimmy Means,J .C . Danielsen ,St. James Davis And Mike Hickingbottom

=== Full qualifying results ===
Pos.	#	Driver	Team	Make	Time	Speed
1	5	Ricky Rudd	Hendrick Motorsports	Chevrolet	1:39.743	90.954
2	4	Ernie Irvan	Morgan–McClure Motorsports	Oldsmobile	1:40.084	90.644
3	3	Dale Earnhardt	Richard Childress Racing	Chevrolet	1:40.247	90.496
4	9	Bill Elliott	Melling Racing	Ford	1:40.646	90.138
5	6	Mark Martin	Roush Racing	Ford	1:40.658	90.134
6	40	Tommy Kendall	Reno Enterprises	Chevrolet	1:40.715	90.076
7	25	Ken Schrader	Hendrick Motorsports	Chevrolet	1:40.853	89.953
8	15	Morgan Shepherd	Bud Moore Engineering	Ford	1:41.343	89.518
9	1	Terry Labonte	Precision Products Racing	Oldsmobile	1:41.362	89.501
10	21	Dale Jarrett	Wood Brothers Racing	Ford	1:41.423	89.447
11	27	Rusty Wallace	Blue Max Racing	Pontiac	1:41.431	89.440
12	17	Darrell Waltrip	Hendrick Motorsports	Chevrolet	1:41.512	89.367
13	42	Kyle Petty	SABCO Racing	Pontiac	1:41.571	89.317
14	75	Rick Wilson	RahMoc Enterprises	Oldsmobile	1:41.594	89.297
15	28	Davey Allison	Robert Yates Racing	Ford	1:41.803	89.112
16	12	Hut Stricklin	Bobby Allison Motorsports	Buick	1:41.868	89.056
17	94	Sterling Marlin	Hagan Racing	Oldsmobile	1:42.057	88.892
18	26	Brett Bodine	King Racing	Buick	1:42.399	88.595
19	10	Derrike Cope	Whitcomb Racing	Chevrolet	1:42.423	88.574
20	30	Michael Waltrip	Bahari Racing	Pontiac	1:42.444	88.556
21	7	Alan Kulwicki	AK Racing	Ford	1:42.546	88.468
22	71	Dave Marcis	Marcis Auto Racing	Chevrolet	1:42.617	88.406
23	19	Chad Little	Little Racing	Ford	1:42.778	88.260
24	20	Rob Moroso (R)	Moroso Racing	Oldsmobile	1:42.848	88.208
25	04	Hershel McGriff	Lipseia Racing	Pontiac	1:42.867	88.192
Failed to lock in Round 1
26	11	Geoff Bodine	Junior Johnson & Associates	Ford	1:40.564	90.211
27	66	Dick Trickle	Cale Yarborough Motorsports	Pontiac	1:40.913	89.899
28	0	Irv Hoerr	Precision Products Racing	Oldsmobile	1:41.779	89.134
29	73	Bill Schmitt	Schmitt Racing	Chevrolet	1:42.880	88.110
30	98	Butch Miller	Travis Carter Enterprises	Chevrolet	1:42.984	88.091
31	8	Bobby Hillin Jr.	Stavola Brothers Racing	Buick	1:43.144	87.955
32	43	Richard Petty	Petty Enterprises	Pontiac	1:43.169	87.933
33	93	Troy Beebe	Beebe Racing	Buick	1:43.192	87.914
34	76	Bill Sedgwick	Spears Motorsports	Chevrolet	1:43.389	87.746
35	99	John Krebs	KC Racing	Pontiac	1:43.654	87.522
36	18	Stan Barrett	Hendrick Motorsports	Chevrolet	1:43.697	87.486
37	09	Terry Fisher	Midgley Racing	Pontiac	1:43.727	87.460
38	23	Mike Chase	Freymiller Racing	Buick	1:44.460	86.847
39	34	Ted Kennedy	Emerson Racing	Oldsmobile	1:44.566	86.759
40	57	Jimmy Spencer	Osterlund Racing	Pontiac	1:44.570	86.755
Winston Cup provisionals
41	33	Harry Gant	Leo Jackson Motorsports	Oldsmobile	1:56.876	77.621
42	2	Jim Bown	U.S. Racing	Chevrolet	1:45.224	86.216
Winston West provisionals
43	24	Butch Gilliland	Gilliland Racing	Chevrolet	-	-
44	44	Jack Sellers	Emerson Racing	Buick	1:56.624	77.788
Failed to qualify
45	52	Jimmy Means	Jimmy Means Racing	Pontiac	-*	-*
46	84	J. C. Danielsen	Danielsen Racing	Ford	-*	-*
47	22	St. James Davis	St. James Racing	Buick	-*	-*
48	03	Mike Hickingbottom	Hickingbottom Racing	Pontiac	-*	-*
Official first round qualifying results
Official starting lineup

== Race results ==
Fin	St	#	Driver	Team	Make	Laps	Led	Status	Pts	Winnings
1	11	27	Rusty Wallace	Blue Max Racing	Pontiac	74	42	running	185	$69,100
2	5	6	Mark Martin	Roush Racing	Ford	74	0	running	170	$34,000
3	1	5	Ricky Rudd	Hendrick Motorsports	Chevrolet	74	13	running	170	$28,675
4	26	11	Geoff Bodine	Junior Johnson & Associates	Ford	74	0	running	160	$20,650
5	31	8	Bobby Hillin Jr.	Stavola Brothers Racing	Buick	74	4	running	160	$17,007
6	17	94	Sterling Marlin	Hagan Racing	Oldsmobile	74	0	running	150	$12,475
7	2	4	Ernie Irvan	Morgan–McClure Motorsports	Oldsmobile	74	7	running	151	$12,700
8	28	0	Irv Hoerr	Precision Products Racing	Oldsmobile	74	0	running	142	$7,000
9	20	30	Michael Waltrip	Bahari Racing	Pontiac	74	0	running	138	$10,600
10	14	75	Rick Wilson	RahMoc Enterprises	Oldsmobile	74	0	running	134	$12,225
11	21	7	Alan Kulwicki	AK Racing	Ford	74	0	running	130	$9,400
12	16	12	Hut Stricklin	Bobby Allison Motorsports	Buick	74	0	running	127	$6,800
13	19	10	Derrike Cope	Whitcomb Racing	Chevrolet	74	0	running	124	$10,000
14	10	21	Dale Jarrett	Wood Brothers Racing	Ford	74	0	running	121	$5,800
15	37	09	Terry Fisher	Midgley Racing	Pontiac	74	0	running	118	$4,575
16	13	42	Kyle Petty	SABCO Racing	Pontiac	74	0	running	115	$10,925
17	36	18	Stan Barrett	Hendrick Motorsports	Chevrolet	74	0	running	112	$3,850
18	7	25	Ken Schrader	Hendrick Motorsports	Chevrolet	74	0	running	109	$10,825
19	41	33	Harry Gant	Leo Jackson Motorsports	Oldsmobile	74	0	running	106	$10,800
20	29	73	Bill Schmitt	Schmitt Racing	Chevrolet	74	0	running	103	$6,650
21	4	9	Bill Elliott	Melling Racing	Ford	74	0	running	100	$12,600
22	42	2	Jim Bown	U.S. Racing	Chevrolet	73	0	running	0	$6,675
23	35	99	John Krebs	KC Racing	Pontiac	73	0	running	94	$4,600
24	15	28	Davey Allison	Robert Yates Racing	Ford	72	0	running	91	$10,580
25	38	23	Mike Chase	Freymiller Racing	Buick	72	4	running	93	$3,575
26	32	43	Richard Petty	Petty Enterprises	Pontiac	71	0	running	85	$4,420
27	40	57	Jimmy Spencer	Osterlund Racing	Pontiac	71	0	running	82	$6,300
28	43	24	Butch Gilliland	Gilliland Racing	Chevrolet	71	0	running	79	$4,200
29	8	15	Morgan Shepherd	Bud Moore Engineering	Ford	70	0	engine	76	$6,165
30	33	93	Troy Beebe	Beebe Racing	Buick	70	0	running	73	$3,475
31	30	98	Butch Miller	Travis Carter Enterprises	Chevrolet	68	0	running	70	$4,075
32	22	71	Dave Marcis	Marcis Auto Racing	Chevrolet	67	0	running	67	$6,025
33	12	17	Darrell Waltrip	Hendrick Motorsports	Chevrolet	65	0	running	64	$12,375
34	3	3	Dale Earnhardt	Richard Childress Racing	Chevrolet	65	0	running	61	$12,650
35	9	1	Terry Labonte	Precision Products Racing	Oldsmobile	62	0	clutch	58	$5,935
36	34	76	Bill Sedgwick	Spears Motorsports	Chevrolet	61	0	running	55	$3,305
37	23	19	Chad Little	Little Racing	Ford	60	0	running	52	$3,295
38	6	40	Tommy Kendall	Reno Enterprises	Chevrolet	46	4	accident	54	$4,025
39	27	66	Dick Trickle	Cale Yarborough Motorsports	Pontiac	41	0	engine	46	$6,250
40	44	44	Jack Sellers	Emerson Racing	Buick	41	0	running	0	$3,225
41	18	26	Brett Bodine	King Racing	Buick	38	0	accident	40	$5,225
42	24	20	Rob Moroso (R)	Moroso Racing	Oldsmobile	17	0	accident	37	$3,975
43	39	34	Ted Kennedy	Emerson Racing	Oldsmobile	11	0	oil line	34	$3,225
44	25	04	Hershel McGriff	Lipseia Racing	Pontiac	2	0	engine	31	$3,225
Official race results

== Standings after the race ==
Drivers' Championship standings

	Pos	Driver	Points
1	1	Mark Martin	1,800
1	2	Morgan Shepherd	1,738 (-62)
1	3	Rusty Wallace	1,688 (-112)
1	4	Dale Earnhardt	1,664 (–136)
	5	Geoff Bodine	1,644 (–156)
	6	Kyle Petty	1,594 (–206)
2	7	Ken Schrader	1,555 (–245)
	8	Bill Elliott	1,546 (–254)
2	9	Darrell Waltrip	1,517 (–283)
	10	Ernie Irvan	1,504 (–296)
Official driver's standings

- Note: Only the first 10 positions are included for the driver standings.

Previous race: 1990 Budweiser 500	NASCAR Winston Cup Series; 1990 season	Next race: 1990 Miller Genuine Draft 500

Previous race: 1990 Spears Manufacturing 400	NASCAR Winston West Series; 1990 season	Next race: 1990 Winston 200
