= Scott Miller (racing driver) =

American racing driver, crew chief, and NASCAR executive (born 1957)

- Born: August 23, 1957 (age 69); Garden Grove, California, U.S.

NASCAR Cup Series career
- 6 races run over 4 years
- Best finish: 71st (1983)
- First race: 1981 Winston Western 500 (Riverside)
- Last race: 1984 Winston Western 500 (Riverside)
Wins	Top tens	Poles
0	0	0

ARCA Menards Series West career
- 17 races run over 6 years
- Best finish: 14th (1984)
- First race: 1981 Sears Point Winston 200 (Sonoma)
- Last race: 1988 7-Up 200 (Sonoma)
- First win: 1984 MDB Systems / MD Spark Plugs 200 (Lancaster)
Wins	Top tens	Poles
1	9	1
- Statistics up to date as of November 10, 2026.

Scott Miller (born August 23, 1957) is an American former professional stock car racing driver and crew chief. He competed in the NASCAR Winston Cup Series and NASCAR Winston West Series in the 1980s. He is the current competition strategist and a former Senior Vice President of Competition for NASCAR. He was also the Executive Vice President of Competition for Michael Waltrip Racing and served in leadership roles at Richard Childress Racing, including serving as a full-time crew chief.

== Racing career ==
Miller first began racing motorcycles, eventually competing at a national level in AMA motocross.

Miller made the transition to racing cars in 1981, where, with support from J. D. Stacy, he competed in the final three races of the NASCAR Winston West Series, scoring a top-ten in his third start at Phoenix International Raceway with a seventh-place finish. These starts included his NASCAR Winston Cup Series debut in the Winston Western 500 at Riverside International Raceway, a combination race with the West Series, where he finished 29th due to engine issues.

Miller competed in a Winston Cup race at Riverside in 1982, finishing thirteenth. He also competed in a standalone Winston West race at the track, finishing seventh.

Miller made five Winston West starts in 1983, finishing second in a race at Riverside and seventh at Caesars Palace. He finished 30th and 22nd in the combination races at Riverside.

In 1984, Miller ran six Winston West races, scoring his lone career win at Willow Springs Speedway after leading all 50 laps and scoring two additional top-tens. He finished 36th and 33rd in the combination races at Riverside, crashing out of his final Winston Cup start.

Miller competed in a Winston West race at Mesa Marin Raceway in 1985, finishing tenth.

Miller made his lone NASCAR Featherlite Southwest Tour start in 1987, finishing fifteenth at Riverside.

Miller made his final Winston West start in 1988, driving for John Kieper at Sears Point International Raceway, where he finished ninth.

== Post-racing career ==
Miller spent five seasons as a chief mechanic in IndyCar before joining TriStar Motorsports in 1995.

Miller spent time at Richard Childress Racing, helping to lead teams into The Chase as both a crew chief and the team's Vice President of Competition. His most successful season came in 2008 with Jeff Burton, who he called to two wins, seven top-five and eighteen top-ten finishes en route to a sixth-place points finish. He then spent four years at Michael Waltrip Racing as Executive Vice President of Competition and a part-time crew chief.

Miller's crew chief career spanned between 2001 and 2013, leading drivers such as Burton, Ricky Craven, and Clint Bowyer to a combined six wins, 30 top-fives, and 75 top-tens in 214 races.

On December 2, 2015, Miller was named NASCAR's Senior Vice President of Competition. In January 2023, it was announced Miller's role would shift to the newly created position of competition strategist.

== Motorsports career results ==
=== NASCAR ===
(key) (Bold – Pole position awarded by qualifying time. Italics – Pole position earned by points standings or practice time. * – Most laps led.)

==== Winston Cup Series ====
NASCAR Winston Cup Series results
Year	Team	No.	Make	1	2	3	4	5	6	7	8	9	10	11	12	13	14	15	16	17	18	19	20	21	22	23	24	25	26	27	28	29	30	31	NWCSC	Pts	Ref
1981	Miller Racing	51	Pontiac	RSD	DAY	RCH	CAR	ATL	BRI	NWS	DAR	MAR	TAL	NSV	DOV	CLT	TWS	RSD	MCH	DAY	NSV	POC	TAL	MCH	BRI	DAR	RCH	DOV	MAR	NWS	CLT	CAR	ATL	RSD; 29	95th	76	
1982	Miller Racing	51	Pontiac	DAY	RCH	BRI	ATL	CAR	DAR	NWS	MAR	TAL	NSV	DOV	CLT	POC	RSD; 13	MCH	DAY	NSV	POC	TAL	MCH	BRI	DAR	RCH	DOV	NWS	CLT	MAR	CAR	ATL	RSD		77th	124	
1983	Miller Racing	51	Pontiac	DAY	RCH	CAR	ATL	DAR	NWS	MAR	TAL	NSV	DOV	BRI	CLT	RSD; 30	POC	MCH	DAY	NSV	POC	TAL	MCH	BRI	DAR	RCH	DOV	MAR	NWS	CLT	CAR	ATL	RSD; 22		71st	170	
1984	Miller Racing	61	Pontiac	DAY	RCH	CAR	ATL	BRI	NWS	DAR	MAR	TAL	NSV	DOV	CLT	RSD; 36	POC	MCH	DAY	NSV	POC	TAL	MCH	BRI	DAR	RCH	DOV	MAR	CLT	NWS	CAR	ATL	RSD; 33		73rd	119	

==== Winston West Series ====
NASCAR Winston West Series results
Year	Team	No.	Make	1	2	3	4	5	6	7	8	9	10	11	12	13	14	NWWSC	Pts	Ref
1981	Miller Racing	5	Pontiac	RSD	S99	AAS	MMR	RSD	LAG	POR	WSP	EVG	SHA	RSD	SON; 19			19th	125	
1981	Miller Racing	51	Pontiac													RSD; 29	PHO; 7	19th	125	
1982	Miller Racing	51	Pontiac	MMR	S99	AAS	RSD	POR	WSP	SHA	EVG	SON	CDR	RSD; 7	RSD	PHO		28th	91	
1983	Miller Racing	51	Pontiac	S99	SON	RSD; 30	YAK	EVG	SHA	RSD; 2	CPL; 7	RSD; 22	PHO; 12					16th	217	
1984	Miller Racing	61	Pontiac	RSD; 36	YAK								RSD; 33					14th	268	
1984	Miller Racing	51	Pontiac			SIR; 12	POR	EVG	SHA	**WSR**; 1*	SON; 4	MMR		PHO; 8				14th	268	
1985	Miller Racing	51	Pontiac	SON	SHA	RSD	MMR	SIR	POR	STA	YAK	EVG	WSR	MMR; 10	RSD			NA	41	
1988	Kieper Racing	98	Chevy	SON; 9	MMR	RSD	SGP	POR	EVG	MMR	PHO							37th	42	
