= 1989 Miller High Life 500 =

13th race of the 1989 NASCAR Winston Cup Series

Race details
- Race 13 of 29 in the 1989 NASCAR Winston Cup Series
- The 1989 Miller High Life 500 program cover, featuring Dick Trickle. Artwork by NASCAR artist Sam Bass.
- Date: June 18, 1989
- Official name: 8th Annual Miller High Life 500
- Location: Long Pond, Pennsylvania, Pocono Raceway
- Course: Permanent racing facility
- Course length: 2.5 miles (4.0 km)
- Distance: 200 laps, 500 mi (804.672 km)
- Scheduled distance: 200 laps, 500 mi (804.672 km)
- Average speed: 131.32 miles per hour (211.34 km/h)
- Attendance: 100,000

Pole position
Driver	Rusty Wallace	Blue Max Racing
- Time: 57.147

Most laps led
Driver	Rusty Wallace	Blue Max Racing
- Laps: 100

Winner
No. 11	Terry Labonte	Junior Johnson & Associates

Television in the United States
- Network: Viewer's Choice (PPV)
- Announcers: Dave Despain, Lyn St. James, Gary Nelson

Radio in the United States
- Radio: Motor Racing Network

The 1989 Miller High Life 500 was the 13th stock car race of the 1989 NASCAR Winston Cup Series season and the eighth iteration of the event. The race was held on Sunday, June 18, 1989, before an audience of 100,000 in Long Pond, Pennsylvania, at Pocono Raceway, a 2.5 miles (4.0 km) triangular permanent course. The race took the scheduled 200 laps to complete. In the final laps of the race, Junior Johnson & Associates driver Terry Labonte would manage to hold off a late-race charge from Jackson Bros. Motorsports driver Harry Gant, leading the final 14 laps of the race to take his 10th career NASCAR Winston Cup Series victory and his first victory of the season. To fill out the top three, the aforementioned Harry Gant and Richard Childress Racing driver Dale Earnhardt would finish second and third, respectively. This was also the second NASCAR race to exclusively air on pay-per-view.

== Background ==
The layout of Pocono International Raceway, the venue where the race was held.

The race was held at Pocono International Raceway, which is a three-turn superspeedway located in Long Pond, Pennsylvania. The track hosts two annual NASCAR Sprint Cup Series races, as well as one Xfinity Series and Camping World Truck Series event. Until 2019, the track also hosted an IndyCar Series race.

Pocono International Raceway is one of a very few NASCAR tracks not owned by either Speedway Motorsports, Inc. or International Speedway Corporation. It is operated by the Igdalsky siblings Brandon, Nicholas, and sister Ashley, and cousins Joseph IV and Chase Mattioli, all of whom are third-generation members of the family-owned Mattco Inc, started by Joseph II and Rose Mattioli.

Outside of the NASCAR races, the track is used throughout the year by the Sports Car Club of America (SCCA) and motorcycle clubs as well as racing schools and an IndyCar race. The triangular oval also has three separate infield sections of racetrack – North Course, East Course and South Course. Each of these infield sections use a separate portion of the tri-oval to complete the track. During regular non-race weekends, multiple clubs can use the track by running on different infield sections. Also some of the infield sections can be run in either direction, or multiple infield sections can be put together – such as running the North Course and the South Course and using the tri-oval to connect the two.

=== Entry list ===
- (R) denotes rookie driver.

#	Driver	Team	Make	Sponsor
2	Ernie Irvan	U.S. Racing	Pontiac	Kroger
3	Dale Earnhardt	Richard Childress Racing	Chevrolet	GM Goodwrench Service Plus
4	Rick Wilson	Morgan–McClure Motorsports	Oldsmobile	Kodak
5	Geoff Bodine	Hendrick Motorsports	Chevrolet	Levi Garrett
6	Mark Martin	Roush Racing	Ford	Stroh's Light
06	Terry Byers	Byers Racing	Chevrolet	Byers Racing
7	Alan Kulwicki	AK Racing	Ford	Zerex
8	Bobby Hillin Jr.	Stavola Brothers Racing	Buick	Miller High Life
9	Bill Elliott	Melling Racing	Ford	Coors Light
10	Derrike Cope	Whitcomb Racing	Pontiac	Purolator Filters
11	Terry Labonte	Junior Johnson & Associates	Ford	Budweiser
15	Brett Bodine	Bud Moore Engineering	Ford	Motorcraft
16	Larry Pearson (R)	Pearson Racing	Buick	Chattanooga Chew
17	Darrell Waltrip	Hendrick Motorsports	Chevrolet	Tide
21	Neil Bonnett	Wood Brothers Racing	Ford	Citgo
25	Ken Schrader	Hendrick Motorsports	Chevrolet	Folgers
26	Ricky Rudd	King Racing	Buick	Quaker State
27	Rusty Wallace	Blue Max Racing	Pontiac	Kodiak
28	Davey Allison	Robert Yates Racing	Ford	Texaco, Havoline
29	Dale Jarrett	Cale Yarborough Motorsports	Pontiac	Hardee's
30	Michael Waltrip	Bahari Racing	Pontiac	Country Time
33	Harry Gant	Jackson Bros. Motorsports	Oldsmobile	Skoal Bandit
43	Richard Petty	Petty Enterprises	Pontiac	STP
49	Trevor Boys	Hylton Motorsports	Buick	Hylton Motorsports
52	Jimmy Means	Jimmy Means Racing	Pontiac	Alka-Seltzer
55	Phil Parsons	Jackson Bros. Motorsports	Oldsmobile	Skoal, Crown Central Petroleum
57	Hut Stricklin (R)	Osterlund Racing	Pontiac	Heinz
63	Randy LaJoie	Rosenblum Racing	Chevrolet	Rosenblum Racing
65	Tommie Crozier	Leonard Racing	Chevrolet	Leonard Racing
71	Dave Marcis	Marcis Auto Racing	Chevrolet	Lifebuoy
75	Morgan Shepherd	RahMoc Enterprises	Pontiac	Valvoline
80	Jimmy Horton	S&H Racing	Pontiac	S&H Racing
83	Lake Speed	Speed Racing	Oldsmobile	Bull's-Eye Barbecue Sauce
84	Dick Trickle (R)	Stavola Brothers Racing	Buick	Miller High Life
85	Bobby Gerhart	Bobby Gerhart Racing	Oldsmobile	James Chevrolet
88	Jimmy Spencer (R)	Baker–Schiff Racing	Oldsmobile	Crisco
94	Sterling Marlin	Hagan Racing	Oldsmobile	Sunoco
99	Norm Benning	O'Neil Racing	Chevrolet	O'Neil Racing

== Qualifying ==
Qualifying was split into two rounds. The first round was held on Friday, June 16, at 3:00 PM EST. Each driver would have one lap to set a time. During the first round, the top 15 drivers in the round would be guaranteed a starting spot in the race. If a driver was not able to guarantee a spot in the first round, they had the option to scrub their time from the first round and try and run a faster lap time in a second round qualifying run, held on Saturday, June 17, at 10:30 AM EST. As with the first round, each driver would have one lap to set a time. For this specific race, positions 16-40 would be decided on time, and depending on who needed it, a select amount of positions were given to cars who had not otherwise qualified but were high enough in owner's points; up to two provisionals were given.

Rusty Wallace, driving for Blue Max Racing, would win the pole, setting a time of 57.147 and an average speed of 157.489 miles per hour (253.454 km/h) in the first round.

No drivers would fail to qualify.

=== Full qualifying results ===
Pos.	#	Driver	Team	Make	Time	Speed
1	27	Rusty Wallace	Blue Max Racing	Pontiac	57.147	157.489
2	17	Darrell Waltrip	Hendrick Motorsports	Chevrolet	57.234	157.249
3	6	Mark Martin	Roush Racing	Ford	57.300	157.068
4	83	Lake Speed	Speed Racing	Oldsmobile	57.355	156.917
5	4	Rick Wilson	Morgan–McClure Motorsports	Oldsmobile	57.453	156.650
6	94	Sterling Marlin	Hagan Racing	Oldsmobile	57.482	156.571
7	3	Dale Earnhardt	Richard Childress Racing	Chevrolet	57.500	156.522
8	9	Bill Elliott	Melling Racing	Ford	57.502	156.516
9	21	Neil Bonnett	Wood Brothers Racing	Ford	57.555	156.372
10	25	Ken Schrader	Hendrick Motorsports	Chevrolet	57.631	156.166
11	33	Harry Gant	Jackson Bros. Motorsports	Oldsmobile	57.658	156.093
12	30	Michael Waltrip	Bahari Racing	Pontiac	57.710	155.952
13	26	Ricky Rudd	King Racing	Buick	57.825	155.642
14	29	Dale Jarrett	Cale Yarborough Motorsports	Pontiac	57.863	155.540
15	7	Alan Kulwicki	AK Racing	Ford	57.912	155.408
Failed to lock in Round 1
16	5	Geoff Bodine	Hendrick Motorsports	Chevrolet	57.129	157.538
17	75	Morgan Shepherd	RahMoc Enterprises	Pontiac	57.764	155.806
18	10	Derrike Cope	Whitcomb Racing	Pontiac	57.933	155.352
19	43	Richard Petty	Petty Enterprises	Pontiac	57.934	155.349
20	55	Phil Parsons	Jackson Bros. Motorsports	Oldsmobile	57.937	155.341
21	2	Ernie Irvan	U.S. Racing	Pontiac	58.135	154.812
22	15	Brett Bodine	Bud Moore Engineering	Ford	58.188	154.671
23	11	Terry Labonte	Junior Johnson & Associates	Ford	58.234	154.549
24	16	Larry Pearson (R)	Pearson Racing	Buick	58.396	154.120
25	80	Jimmy Horton	S&H Racing	Pontiac	58.399	154.112
26	88	Jimmy Spencer (R)	Baker–Schiff Racing	Oldsmobile	58.413	154.075
27	28	Davey Allison	Robert Yates Racing	Ford	58.426	154.041
28	84	Dick Trickle (R)	Stavola Brothers Racing	Buick	58.577	153.644
29	52	Jimmy Means	Jimmy Means Racing	Pontiac	58.717	153.278
30	8	Bobby Hillin Jr.	Stavola Brothers Racing	Buick	59.007	152.524
31	71	Dave Marcis	Marcis Auto Racing	Chevrolet	59.247	151.906
32	63	Randy LaJoie	Rosenblum Racing	Chevrolet	59.270	151.847
33	49	Trevor Boys	Hylton Motorsports	Buick	59.529	151.187
34	57	Hut Stricklin (R)	Osterlund Racing	Pontiac	59.586	151.042
35	06	Terry Byers	Byers Racing	Chevrolet	59.685	150.792
36	99	Norm Benning	O'Neil Racing	Chevrolet	1:00.916	147.744
37	85	Bobby Gerhart	Bobby Gerhart Racing	Oldsmobile	1:01.012	147.512
38	65	Tommie Crozier	Leonard Racing	Chevrolet	1:05.905	136.560
Official first round qualifying results
Official starting lineup

== Race results ==
Fin	St	#	Driver	Team	Make	Laps	Led	Status	Pts	Winnings
1	23	11	Terry Labonte	Junior Johnson & Associates	Ford	200	39	running	180	$54,807
2	11	33	Harry Gant	Jackson Bros. Motorsports	Oldsmobile	200	12	running	175	$33,875
3	7	3	Dale Earnhardt	Richard Childress Racing	Chevrolet	200	12	running	170	$29,250
4	10	25	Ken Schrader	Hendrick Motorsports	Chevrolet	200	2	running	165	$20,600
5	17	75	Morgan Shepherd	RahMoc Enterprises	Pontiac	200	0	running	155	$21,850
6	6	94	Sterling Marlin	Hagan Racing	Oldsmobile	200	0	running	150	$14,925
7	14	29	Dale Jarrett	Cale Yarborough Motorsports	Pontiac	200	1	running	151	$11,150
8	9	21	Neil Bonnett	Wood Brothers Racing	Ford	200	2	running	147	$10,125
9	24	16	Larry Pearson (R)	Pearson Racing	Buick	200	2	running	143	$8,325
10	22	15	Brett Bodine	Bud Moore Engineering	Ford	199	0	running	134	$11,650
11	4	83	Lake Speed	Speed Racing	Oldsmobile	199	5	running	135	$8,650
12	20	55	Phil Parsons	Jackson Bros. Motorsports	Oldsmobile	199	0	running	127	$8,350
13	30	8	Bobby Hillin Jr.	Stavola Brothers Racing	Buick	199	0	running	124	$7,950
14	12	30	Michael Waltrip	Bahari Racing	Pontiac	199	1	running	126	$7,450
15	3	6	Mark Martin	Roush Racing	Ford	198	0	running	118	$7,650
16	27	28	Davey Allison	Robert Yates Racing	Ford	197	0	running	115	$12,250
17	34	57	Hut Stricklin (R)	Osterlund Racing	Pontiac	197	0	running	112	$5,000
18	31	71	Dave Marcis	Marcis Auto Racing	Chevrolet	197	0	running	109	$6,600
19	35	06	Terry Byers	Byers Racing	Chevrolet	197	0	running	106	$3,525
20	13	26	Ricky Rudd	King Racing	Buick	197	0	running	103	$11,225
21	8	9	Bill Elliott	Melling Racing	Ford	197	0	running	100	$14,250
22	1	27	Rusty Wallace	Blue Max Racing	Pontiac	194	100	running	107	$16,825
23	37	85	Bobby Gerhart	Bobby Gerhart Racing	Oldsmobile	193	0	running	94	$2,975
24	28	84	Dick Trickle (R)	Stavola Brothers Racing	Buick	190	0	running	91	$5,775
25	19	43	Richard Petty	Petty Enterprises	Pontiac	189	0	running	88	$3,775
26	21	2	Ernie Irvan	U.S. Racing	Pontiac	189	0	running	85	$3,525
27	5	4	Rick Wilson	Morgan–McClure Motorsports	Oldsmobile	185	0	running	82	$5,450
28	32	63	Randy LaJoie	Rosenblum Racing	Chevrolet	178	0	crash	79	$2,725
29	29	52	Jimmy Means	Jimmy Means Racing	Pontiac	153	0	crash	76	$2,675
30	36	99	Norm Benning	O'Neil Racing	Chevrolet	151	0	engine	73	$2,675
31	33	49	Trevor Boys	Hylton Motorsports	Buick	118	2	engine	0	$2,575
32	2	17	Darrell Waltrip	Hendrick Motorsports	Chevrolet	104	22	engine	72	$11,875
33	26	88	Jimmy Spencer (R)	Baker–Schiff Racing	Oldsmobile	104	0	engine	0	$5,100
34	15	7	Alan Kulwicki	AK Racing	Ford	96	0	engine	61	$5,025
35	16	5	Geoff Bodine	Hendrick Motorsports	Chevrolet	78	0	crash	58	$10,850
36	18	10	Derrike Cope	Whitcomb Racing	Pontiac	44	0	engine	55	$2,900
37	25	80	Jimmy Horton	S&H Racing	Pontiac	29	0	engine	52	$2,250
38	38	65	Tommie Crozier	Leonard Racing	Chevrolet	16	0	transmission	49	$2,850
Official race results

== Standings after the race ==
Drivers' Championship standings

	Pos	Driver	Points
	1	Dale Earnhardt	1,945
1	2	Rusty Wallace	1,755 (-190)
1	3	Darrell Waltrip	1,738 (-207)
1	4	Mark Martin	1,731 (–214)
1	5	Geoff Bodine	1,695 (–250)
2	6	Sterling Marlin	1,652 (–293)
4	7	Ken Schrader	1,625 (–320)
2	8	Bill Elliott	1,623 (–322)
	9	Davey Allison	1,611 (–334)
	10	Ricky Rudd	1,589 (–356)
Official driver's standings

- Note: Only the first 10 positions are included for the driver standings.

Previous race: 1989 Banquet Frozen Foods 300	NASCAR Winston Cup Series; 1989 season	Next race: 1989 Miller High Life 400 (Michigan)
