= 1988 Goodyear NASCAR 500 =

NASCAR event in Melbourne, Australia

Race details
- Exhibition race in the 1988 NASCAR Winston Cup Series season
- Sponsored by Goodyear Tire and Rubber Company
- Date: February 28, 1988
- Location: Calder Park Thunderdome
- Course: Permanent racing facility
- Course length: 1.119 miles (1.801 km)
- Distance: 280 laps, 313.35 mi (504.28 km)
- Weather: Temperatures ranging between 11 °C (52 °F) and 23 °C (73 °F)
- Average speed: 101.670 miles per hour (163.622 km/h)
- Attendance: 46,000 (approx)

Pole position
| Driver | Neil Bonnett | RahMoc Enterprises |
- Time: 28.829

Winner
| No. 75 | Neil Bonnett | RahMoc Enterprises |

Television in the United States
- Network: ESPN (simulcast of Seven Network coverage)
- Announcers: Mike Raymond, Garry Wilkinson and Neil Crompton

The Goodyear NASCAR 500 was a non-championship exhibition NASCAR Winston Cup Series race run at the then new A$54 million Calder Park Thunderdome in Melbourne, Australia on 28 February 1988. The race was the first ever NASCAR event held outside North America. Unlike Winston Cup races in the United States, the 500 was actually 500 kilometres, which is only 310 miles (roughly the same length as a Busch Series race).

Headlining the race were a number of Winston Cup and Winston West Series drivers such as Alabama Gang members Bobby Allison, who had won the 1988 Daytona 500 just two weeks prior (his third and last win in the event), and Neil Bonnett, who had won the previous weekends Pontiac Excitement 400 at the Richmond International Raceway. Other NASCAR regulars including Michael Waltrip (the younger brother of three-time Winston Cup champion Darrell Waltrip and a future Daytona 500 winner) and Dave Marcis took on Australians new to super speedway racing such as touring car drivers Allan Grice, Kiwi Jim Richards, and Dick Johnson, although Grice had previously raced in Winston Cup events such as the longest race in the series, the Coca-Cola 600 at the famous Charlotte Motor Speedway, the track on which Calder Park owner Bob Jane had modeled the Thunderdome. Grice had qualified 32nd at the 1987 Coca-Cola 600, becoming the second Australian to qualify for a NASCAR Winston Cup race (the first had been Frank Gardner in the 1968 American 500 at the North Carolina Motor Speedway). In Charlotte, Grice would be classified in 35th place at the end of the 600 after his car suffered differential failure.

The most famous last name in NASCAR racing history was also represented. Kyle Petty, the son of NASCAR's "King" Richard Petty and the grandson of Lee Petty, the winner of the very first Daytona 500 in 1959, also made the trip down under for Australia's first ever NASCAR race. In a test session prior the meeting, Richard Petty set an unofficial lap record for the Thunderdome of 28.2 seconds for an average speed of 142.85 mp/h.

The race was broadcast live across Australia by the Seven Network, and was broadcast internationally through ESPN in the US and also throughout Europe, with commentary provided by Seven's regular motor sport commentary team of Mike Raymond, Garry Wilkinson and Neil Crompton. Long-time motor racing and NASCAR journalist Chris Economaki, who had previously been part of Seven's Bathurst 1000 coverage in the late 1970s and early 1980s, also returned to Australia to be Seven's pit reporter and NASCAR expert during the race with local motoring journalist and race driver Peter McKay also doing pit reports. Seven used a number of RaceCam units during the race with cameras mounted in several cars including those of Neil Bonnett and regular racecam drivers Allan Grice and Dick Johnson.

== Qualifying ==
The race was 280 laps of the 1.801 km (1.119 mi) quad-oval Thunderdome (though it was generally referred to as a tri-oval through its life). Neil Bonnett driving his 1987 model Pontiac Grand Prix for his Winston Cup team RahMoc Enterprises, won the $10,000 Goodyear-Parkroyal Pole Shootout with a time of 28.829 ahead of Allison, whose Buick LeSabre ended up just 0.018 behind Bonnett, and the fastest of the Aussies, Allan Grice driving an Oldsmobile Delta 88 with a time of 28.871 seconds. Behind Grice, the highest placed Australian was Tasmanian speedway driver Robin Best, who qualified 4th in his Chevrolet Monte Carlo.

The only non-GM product in the top 10 was the Ford Thunderbird of former motorcycle speedway rider turned stock car racer Sumner McKnight, who qualified in 10th place.

During Friday's qualifying session, Bonnett was the fastest qualifier, with a time of 28.71 seconds.

=== Top ten qualifiers ===
* Note: Speed shown in mp/h

| Grid | No. | Driver | Car | Time | Speed |
|---|---|---|---|---|---|
| 1 | 75 | (United States) Neil Bonnett | Pontiac Grand Prix | 28.829 | 139.734 |
| 2 | 12 | (United States) Bobby Allison | Buick LeSabre | 28.847 | 139.647 |
| 3 | 3 | (Australia) Allan Grice | Oldsmobile Delta 88 | 28.871 | 139.531 |
| 4 | 88 | (Australia) Robin Best | Chevrolet Monte Carlo | 29.088 | 138.490 |
| 5 | 78 | (United States) Ron Esau | Oldsmobile Delta 88 | 29.149 | 138.200 |
| 6 | 81 | (United States) David Sosebee | Chevrolet Monte Carlo | 29.157 | 138.162 |
| 7 | 25 | (United States) Bill Venturini | Chevrolet Monte Carlo | 29.281 | 137.577 |
| 8 | 98 | (United States) Hershel McGriff | Chevrolet Monte Carlo | 29.370 | 137.160 |
| 9 | 28 | (United States) Gary Collins | Oldsmobile Delta 88 | 29.564 | 136.260 |
| 10 | 83 | (United States) Sumner McKnight | Ford Thunderbird | 29.584 | 136.168 |

== Race summary ==
Bonnett and Allison dominated the race, swapping the lead many times in the heat of the summer afternoon where cabin temperatures were reported to reach over 57 °C (135 °F).

Bonnett led from the start, with Grice passing Allison coming out of turn 2 to move into second on lap 2. The Aussie then set out after Bonnet with Allison in hot pursuit and was looking likely to challenge the Pontiac, but came off second best in a touch with Allison's Buick coming out of Turn 4 which brought the race's first caution after just 13 laps after Grice's Oldsmobile was sent spinning across the infield. While Grice had over 20 years of motor racing experience, his NASCAR experience was limited compared to Allison's who at that stage was a 27-year veteran of the sport with some 707 race starts and 86 Winston Cup wins so it was no surprise to see the American come through without a drama. For Grice, it sent him to the rear of the field for the restart and over the next 50 or so laps, his charge back through the field saw the brakes go away on his Oldsmobile.

Michael Waltrip had the inglorious honour of being the first to call into the pits at the end of the first lap for new tyres after a tap from behind had sent him into a half spin from which he quickly recovered. The tap also saw damage to the rear of Waltrip's Monte Carlo. It wasn't his first actual call to the pits as he was in and out during the formation laps before the start signalling a long day ahead.

The race was marred by a multi-car crash at around lap 80 in turns 3 and 4 involving eight cars, including the Ford Thunderbird of Dick Johnson and Grice who, after struggling with no brakes in his charge through the field, ran into the wreck at speed, heavily damaging both his and Johnson's cars in the process as it was the No. 17 Thunderbird that he hit. Grice suffered a broken collarbone as a result of the high speed accident, while both his and Johnson's cars were write-offs.

The fastest man at the Thunderdome, Neil Bonnett, won the race by less than a second from a fast closing Bobby Allison who benefited from a late race yellow flag pit stop which allowed him to change all four tyres without losing a lap. The Alabama Gang members dominated the race with Dave Marcis finishing 3rd giving the USA a 1–2–3 result and the trio finishing two laps clear of 4th placed Glen Steurer driving a Monte Carlo. In fact, the top 10 finishers were Americans, proving that experience in this form of racing was paramount. The first Australian to finish was the Monte Carlo of Robin Best, who finished 13 laps down in 11th place.

Only 15 of the 32 car field finished the race.

Bonnett's win earned him A$59,000 (US$42,000).

=== Race results ===
| Pos | Grid | No. | Driver | Car | Laps | Status |
|---|---|---|---|---|---|---|
| 1 | 1 | 75 | (United States) Neil Bonnett | Pontiac Grand Prix | 280 | running |
| 2 | 2 | 12 | (United States) Bobby Allison | Buick LeSabre | 280 | running |
| 3 | 15 | 71 | (United States) Dave Marcis | Chevrolet Monte Carlo | 280 | running |
| 4 | 11 | 18 | (United States) Glen Steurer | Chevrolet Monte Carlo | 278 | running |
| 5 | 10 | 83 | (United States) Sumner McKnight | Ford Thunderbird | 278 | running |
| 6 | 8 | 98 | (United States) Hershel McGriff | Chevrolet Monte Carlo | 275 | running |
| 7 | 19 | 15 | (United States) Terry Petris | Chevrolet Monte Carlo | 275 | running |
| 8 | 12 | 19 | (United States) Chad Little | Ford Thunderbird | 273 | running |
| 9 | 18 | 82 | (United States) Jim Danielson | Buick LeSabre | 272 | running |
| 10 | 22 | 21 | (United States) Kyle Petty | Chevrolet Monte Carlo | 269 | running |
| 11 | 4 | 88 | (Australia) Robin Best | Chevrolet Monte Carlo | 267 | running |
| 12 | 13 | 32 | (United States) Ruben Garcia | Chevrolet Monte Carlo | 267 | running |
| 13 | 23 | 11 | (Canada) Jerry Churchill | Chevrolet Monte Carlo | 258 | running |
| 14 | 21 | 30 | (United States) Michael Waltrip | Chevrolet Monte Carlo | 248 | running |
| 15 | 14 | 89 | (United States) Bob Howard | Oldsmobile Delta 88 | 233 | running |
| DNF | 6 | 81 | (United States) David Sosebee | Chevrolet Monte Carlo | 205 | transmission |
| DNF | 26 | 1 | (New Zealand) Jim Richards | Oldsmobile Delta 88 | 182 | engine |
| DNF | 12 | 78 | (United States) Ron Esau | Oldsmobile Delta 88 | 160 | engine |
| DNF | 9 | 28 | (United States) Gary Collins | Oldsmobile Delta 88 | 80 | crash |
| DNF | 28 | 17 | (Australia) Dick Johnson | Ford Thunderbird | 80 | crash |
| DNF | 3 | 03 | (Australia) Allan Grice | Oldsmobile Delta 88 | 80 | crash |
| DNF | 27 | 96 | (United States) Brad Noffsinger | Pontiac Grand Prix | 80 | crash |
| DNF | 17 | 14 | (United States) Harry Goularte | Chevrolet Monte Carlo | 79 | crash |
| DNF | 32 | 6 | (Australia) John Lawes | Oldsmobile Delta 88 | 77 | crash |
| DNF | 20 | 26 | (Australia) Terry Byers | Chevrolet Monte Carlo | 76 | crash |
| DNF | 7 | 25 | (United States) Bill Venturini | Chevrolet Monte Carlo | 69 | crash |
| DNF | 29 | 8 | (United States) Rick McCray | Chevrolet Monte Carlo | 63 | crash |
| DNF | 25 | 2 | (Australia) Garry Rush | Chevrolet Monte Carlo | 54 | overheating |
| DNF | 24 | 33 | (United States) John Krebs | Oldsmobile Delta 88 | 48 | engine |
| DNF | 16 | 73 | (United States) Bill Schmitt | Chevrolet Monte Carlo | 31 | engine |
| DNF | 30 | 48 | (Australia) Tony Spanos | Chevrolet Monte Carlo | 17 | transmission |
| DNF | 31 | 22 | (United States) St. James Davis | Buick LaSabre | 2 | handling |
Source: 1988 Goodyear NASCAR 500 results from racing-reference.info

== Notes ==
- Pole speed – 139.734 mp/h
- Race average speed – 101.67 mp/h
- Cautions – 11 for 52 laps
- Lead changes – 25
- Winning margin – 0.86 seconds
- Race time – 3:23:45
- Attendance – 46,000 (approx)
- Grand marshal – Bob Jane
- Official pace car – Holden VL Commodore SS Group A SV
- Pace car driver – John Harvey
