= Sumner McKnight =

American racing driver (born 1946)

- Born: September 9, 1946 (age 80); Newport Beach, California, U.S.

NASCAR Cup Series career
- 6 races run over 4 years
- Best finish: 73rd (1985)
- First race: 1977 NAPA 400 (Riverside)
- Last race: 1985 Budweiser 400 (Riverside)
| Wins | Top tens | Poles |
|---|---|---|
| 0 | 0 | 0 |

ARCA Menards Series West career
- 94 races run over 11 years
- Best finish: 3rd (1984)
- First race: 1976 Winston Evergreen 150 (Evergreen)
- Last race: 1989 Coors 200 (Mesa Marin)
- First win: 1977 Winston Roseville 100 (Roseville)
- Last win: 1984 Suncrest Motorhomes 200 (Mesa Marin)
| Wins | Top tens | Poles |
|---|---|---|
| 2 | 47 | 1 |
- Statistics up to date as of November 5, 2026.

Sumner McKnight (born September 9, 1946) is an American former motorcycle speedway and stock car racing driver. After spending some time in motorcycle racing, McKnight began racing in NASCAR, primarily the Winston West Series, where he competed between 1976 and 1989.

== Racing career ==
McKnight was a member of the Swindon Robins in the 1973 British League season, ending the season with an average of 0.94 points per race.

McKnight began competing in the NASCAR Winston West Series in 1976, winning the pole at Evergreen Speedway in his debut and scoring seven top-tens in ten starts. He finished sixth in the standings. He attempted his first NASCAR Winston Cup Series race in a combination race at Ontario Motor Speedway, failing to qualify. He also competed in a NASCAR Late Model Sportsman National Championship race at Riverside International Raceway, finishing nineteenth.

McKnight ran sixteen of twenty Winston West races in 1977, winning the first series race at All American Speedway and scoring eight top-tens. He finished eighth in the standings. His schedule included two Winston Cup attempts in combination races, failing to qualify for the season opener at Riverside and finishing 31st in his Winston Cup debut at the track due to engine issues. McKnight made his lone USAC Stock Car Series start at Ontario, finishing fourteenth. He finished 24th at Riverside in his lone recorded Late Model Sportsman National Championship start.

McKnight next competed in the Winston West Series in 1981, attempting seven races, failing to qualify at Laguna Seca Raceway and scoring two top-tens with a best finish of fourth at Evergreen.

In 1982, McKnight ran eleven of thirteen Winston West races, scoring four top-tens with a best finish of fourth at Continental Divide Raceways.

McKnight competed full-time in the Winston West Series for the first time in 1983, running all ten races; he had Chuck E. Cheese's as a sponsor for the first six races, and in his ten starts scored four top-tens with a best finish of fourth at Shasta Speedway. He finished eighth in the standings. In the combination races at Riverside, he finished fifteenth and nineteenth.

McKnight again competed full-time in the Winston West Series in 1984, scoring his second and final career win at Mesa Marin Raceway and eight total top-tens. He finished a career-best third in the standings. McKnight finished 25th due to engine issues in the first Riverside combination race and nineteenth in the second.

McKnight ran seven Winston West races in 1985, scoring three top-tens with a best finish of fifth at Willow Springs Speedway. In his final Winston Cup start, a combination race at Riverside, he finished fourteenth.

In 1986, McKnight ran four Winston West races, but failed to finish any of them due to various mechanical issues; his best result was seventeenth in the season opener at Sears Point International Raceway.

McKnight made six starts in 1987, scoring five top-tens with a best finish of second at Sears Point and the Tacoma Dome.

McKnight attempted seven of eight races in 1988, scoring four top-tens with a best finish of fifth at Evergreen. In the combination race at Riverside, his final Winston Cup attempt, he failed to qualify. McKnight competed in the first NASCAR race held outside North America, the 1988 Goodyear NASCAR 500 at the Calder Park Thunderdome in Australia, where he finished fifth.

McKnight made his final Winston West starts in 1989, running seven races and scoring top-tens in the first two (seventh at Madera Speedway and eighth at Mesa Marin); he crashed out of his final start, the Coors 200 at Mesa Marin.
