= Troy Beebe =

American racing driver (born 1962)

- Born: January 5, 1962 (age 64); Modesto, California, U.S.

NASCAR Cup Series career
- 5 races run over 2 years
- Best finish: 71st (1990)
- First race: 1989 Banquet Frozen Foods 300 (Sonoma)
- Last race: 1990 Checker 500 (Phoenix)
Wins	Top tens	Poles
0	0	0

NASCAR O'Reilly Auto Parts Series career
- 48 races run over 5 years
- Best finish: 22nd (1991)
- First race: 1991 Pontiac 200 (Richmond)
- Last race: 1995 AC Delco 200 (Rockingham)
Wins	Top tens	Poles
0	1	0

NASCAR FedEx Freight Truck Series career
- 6 races run over 2 years
- Best finish: 40th (1995)
- First race: 1995 Skoal Bandit Copper World Classic (Phoenix)
- Last race: 1997 Carquest Auto Parts 420K (Las Vegas)
Wins	Top tens	Poles
0	0	0

Troy Allen Beebe (born January 5, 1962) is an American former professional auto racing driver. He competed in the NASCAR Busch Series from 1990 to 1997.

== Racing career ==
=== Winston Cup Series ===
Beebe was born in Modesto, California. He made his debut in the premier NASCAR series in 1989, running one race at Sonoma in a car owned by his father. He put the No. 93 Taco Bell Buick into the field in 32nd. From there, he completed all but two laps en route to a 24th.

Beebe would run four races in the series in 1990, switching between his family-owned car and those owned by D.K. Ulrich. He could not top his '89 running, only managing a best finish of 30th at Sonoma. His other three finishes were 37th, 31st and 35th. However, he did record his best career start at Michigan, starting in the 28th slot.

=== Busch Series ===
Beebe moved his team to the Busch Series, where they ran 23 races in 1991. He made his debut in the No. 9 Taco Bell car at Richmond, where he put his car in the field in 31st. He would finish that race 24th. The very next race at Martinsville, Beebe managed an eleventh place, and shortly afterwards, he earned his season-best qualifying effort of fourth at Hickory. Beebe was more consistent at the end of the year, topping off eleven top-twenties in the year with his first career top-ten, a tenth place finish at IRP. It was the highlight of the year that ended with Beebe 22nd in points.

Beebe only managed fourteen starts in 1992, racing his No. 24 Banana Boat Ford. In those starts, Beebe struggled. His best finish of the year was a fifteenth at Daytona and his only other top-twenty finishes were a pair of sixteenths. This could largely be explained by seven DNFs, meaning he did not finish half his starts.

Beebe only managed eight more starts in 1993, once again with poor results. His best finish was a seventeenth place at Orange County. He failed to finish five races that season.

As a result, Beebe only attempted one race in 1994. He managed a 39th place start at Dover, and finished in 32nd after an engine change.

Beebe only ran two races in 1995, which would be the final time he would run a Busch race. He was 36th at Darlington and 43rd at Rockingham. He crashed out of both events and then moved to the Craftsman Truck Series.

=== Craftsman Truck Series ===
Beebe started the inaugural season in 1995, running the No. 10 Chevy at Phoenix, starting 24th and finishing thirtieth. He managed four more starts on the season in the No. 89 Chevy, recording a best finish of twelfth at Saugus. His best start was also at Saugus, which was thirteenth.

Beebe's last start in any NASCAR series came in 1997, driving the No. 06 Farris Racing Chevy. Beebe started 24th, but only lasted two laps en route to a 39th place finish at Las Vegas.
