= Jim Danielsen =

American racing driver (1930–2019)

- Born: December 11, 1930; Chico, California, U.S.
- Died: December 27, 2019 (aged 89)

NASCAR Cup Series career
- 5 races run over 4 years
- Best finish: 80th (1972)
- First race: 1972 Winston Western 500 (Riverside)
- Last race: 1976 Riverside 400 (Riverside)
Wins	Top tens	Poles
0	2	0

ARCA Menards Series West career
- 98 races run over 16 years
- Best finish: 4th (1988)
- First race: 1971 Race 4 (San Jose)
- Last race: 1991 Winston 200 (Saugus)
Wins	Top tens	Poles
0	45	2
- Statistics up to date as of April 4, 2025.

Jim "J. C." Danielsen (December 11, 1930 – December 27, 2019) was an American professional stock car racing driver. He competed in the NASCAR Winston Cup Series and NASCAR Winston West Series.

== Life and career ==
Danielsen competed in 675 laps of NASCAR Winston Cup Series racing action - the equivalent of 1,746.4 miles (2,810.6 km) - and brought home a grand total of $6,975 in career earnings ($39,463.82 when adjusted for inflation). He started in 32nd place on average and finished in 19th. Danielsen's only top-ten finish came at 1973 Winston Western 500. His attempts to qualify for the 1988 Budweiser 400 and the 1990 Banquet Frozen Foods 300 both led to DNQs. Danielsen's primary sponsor was Chico's Auto Parts with the vehicle being the John Nissen and Skip Tarter-owned No. 9 Dodge.

Danielsen also raced in what is now known as the ARCA Menards Series West, where he competed in 98 racing events with 45 finishes in the top-ten. His West Series career spanned from 1972 to 1991.

Danielsen also competed internationally during his career, finishing ninth in the Goodyear NASCAR 500 at the Calder Park Thunderdome in Melbourne, Australia, in February 1988 driving a Buick LeSabre. Although not a championship race, this was the first ever NASCAR race held outside of North America. He returned to the track for the 1988 NASCAR Christmas 500, where he finished thirteenth, and for the 1990 NASCAR Christmas 400, where he finished 21st.

Danielsen died on December 27, 2019, at the age of 88.
