= Roy Smith (racing driver) =

Canadian racing driver (1944–2004)

- Smith at the 1982 Daytona 500
- Born: August 6, 1944; Oliver, British Columbia, Canada
- Died: February 26, 2004 (aged 59); Queen Charlotte Sound, Canada
- Achievements: NASCAR Winston West Series Champion (1980, 1981, 1982, and 1988)
- Awards: West Coast Stock Car Hall of Fame (2002 - Inaugural Class); Canadian Motorsport Hall of Fame (2002)

NASCAR Cup Series career
- 26 races run over 13 years
- First race: 1975 Los Angeles Times 500 (Ontario)
- Last race: 1989 Autoworks 500 (Phoenix)
Wins	Top tens	Poles
0	4	0

ARCA Menards Series West career
- 109 races run over 17 years
- Best finish: 1st (1980, 1981, 1982, 1988)
- First race: 1973 Altamont 100 (Altamont)
- Last race: 1997 Fry's Electronics/Iomega Zip 100 (Sonoma)
- First win: 1979 Kyte Coca-Cola 100 (Portland)
- Last win: 1990 Miller Genuine Draft 200 (Tri-City)
Wins	Top tens	Poles
15	67	10
- Statistics up to date as of March 21, 2025.

Roy Smith (August 6, 1944 – February 26, 2004) was a Canadian NASCAR driver and part of a Victoria-era racing family. His brother Al and his son Gary also raced.

== Career ==
Smith raced the majority of his career in Winston West, winning four championships (1980–82, 1988), although he made three standalone Winston Cup starts, all in the Daytona 500.

Smith's official NASCAR Cup Series record shows 26 starts, as the other 23 starts were in combination races were Cup/West races. Until 1998, when NASCAR aligned the Winston West Series with the Busch North Series, all Winston Cup races in California or Arizona (along with the 1994 Brickyard 400) were declared combination races where NASCAR could feature both regular "East Coast" (Cup) drivers racing with the West Coast (West) drivers (a similar move was used in the Busch Grand National and Busch North Series races in the Northeast at the time). For West Series drivers, they were awarded points for their series compared to other West Series drivers, and also scored an official Cup start, but not charged with one of the five starts for Rookie of the Year in Cup.

In the Cup Series, Smith had four finishes in the top-ten, including the 1982 Daytona 500, and no wins. He competed in the 1988 NASCAR Christmas 500 at the Calder Park Thunderdome in Australia, starting tenth and finishing twelfth.

Smith was inducted in the West Coast Stock Car Hall of Fame in 2002, and the Canadian Motorsport Hall of Fame the same year.

== See also ==
- List of Canadians in NASCAR

Sporting positions
Preceded by Bill Schmitt	NASCAR Winston West Series champion 1980–1982	Succeeded by Jim Robinson
Preceded by Chad Little	NASCAR Winston West Series champion 1988	Succeeded by Bill Schmitt
