= Glen Steurer =

American racing driver (born 1955)

- Born: June 3, 1955 (age 71); Canoga Park, California, U.S.
- Awards: 1985 NASCAR Winston West Series Rookie of the Year

NASCAR Cup Series career
- 5 races run over 3 years
- Best finish: 51st (1985)
- First race: 1985 Budweiser 400 (Riverside)
- Last race: 1987 Winston Western 500 (Riverside)
Wins	Top tens	Poles
0	1	0

ARCA Menards Series West career
- 33 races run over 7 years
- Best finish: 4th (1985)
- First race: 1977 Winston Ontario 250 (Ontario)
- Last race: 1991 Motorcraft 500 (Evergreen)
Wins	Top tens	Poles
0	19	2
- Statistics up to date as of October 8, 2026.

Glen Steurer (born June 3, 1955) is an American former professional stock car racing driver. He primarily competed in the NASCAR Winston West Series between 1977 and 1991.

== Racing career ==
Steurer ran the 1975 Permatex 200, a NASCAR Late Model Sportsman National Championship race at Riverside International Raceway, finishing 45th.

Steurer made his first NASCAR Winston West Series starts in 1977, finishing eighth at Ontario Motor Speedway and sixth at Saugus Speedway.

Steurer made his only USAC Stock Car Series start in 1978, finishing tenth at Ontario.

Steurer attempted two Western States Open Competition Series in 1979, finishing seventh at Saugus and failing to qualify at Mesa Marin Raceway.

Steurer ran the 1981 Copper World Classic at Phoenix International Raceway, finishing tenth.

Steurer made at least one NASCAR All-American Challenge Series start in 1984, finishing third at Riverside.

In 1985, Steurer returned to the Winston West Series, competing full-time and scoring nine top-tens in twelve starts with a best finish of third at Sears Point International Raceway and Mesa Marin. He finished a career-best fourth in the standings and won Rookie of the Year by two points over Blair Aiken. The West Series schedule included two combination races with the NASCAR Winston Cup Series, both at Riverside, where he finished eleventh in both.

Steurer returned to the West Series full-time in 1986, scoring four top-tens in eight races, with a best finish of fourth at Willow Springs Speedway. He finished tenth in the first RIverside combination race, his lone Winston Cup top-ten, and sixteenth in the second Riverside combination race.

Steurer ran four of eight Winston West races in 1987, scoring his first pole at the Tacoma Dome, where he also scored his best finish of the season in third. In the second Riverside combination race, his final career Winston Cup start, he finished 41st due to suspension issues.

Steurer ran five Winston West races in 1988, scoring a pole in the season opener at Sears Point and a best finish of fifth at Sears Point and Mesa Marin. In the combination race at Riverside, his final Winston Cup attempt, he failed to qualify. He attempted a NASCAR Southwest Tour race at Mesa Marin, failing to qualify. He also competed in the first NASCAR race held outside North America, the 1988 Goodyear NASCAR 500 at Australia's Calder Park Thunderdome, finishing fourth. He returned at the same track to run the 1988 NASCAR Christmas 500, finishing tenth.

Steurer ran the first race of the 1990 Winston West season at Mesa Marin, finishing twelfth.

Steurer made his final career Winston West start in 1991, finishing 30th at Evergreen Speedway due to lap nineteen crash.

Steurer attempted a NASCAR Featherlite Southwest Tour race at Sears Point in 1994, failing to qualify.

== Motorsports career results ==
=== NASCAR ===
(key) (Bold – Pole position awarded by qualifying time. Italics – Pole position earned by points standings or practice time. * – Most laps led.)

==== Winston Cup Series ====
NASCAR Winston Cup Series results
Year	Team	No.	Make	1	2	3	4	5	6	7	8	9	10	11	12	13	14	15	16	17	18	19	20	21	22	23	24	25	26	27	28	29	NWCSC	Pts	Ref
1985	Steurer Racing	18	Chevy	DAY	RCH	CAR	ATL	BRI	DAR	NWS	MAR	TAL	DOV	CLT	RSD; 11	POC	MCH	DAY	POC	TAL	MCH	BRI	DAR	RCH	DOV	MAR	NWS	CLT	CAR	ATL	RSD; 11		51st	260	
1986	Steurer Racing	18	Chevy	DAY	RCH	CAR	ATL	BRI	DAR	NWS	MAR	TAL	DOV	CLT	RSD; 10	POC	MCH	DAY	POC	TAL	GLN	MCH	BRI	DAR	RCH	DOV	MAR	NWS	CLT	CAR	ATL	RSD; 16	63rd	249	
1987	Steurer Racing	81	Chevy	DAY	CAR	RCH	ATL	DAR	NWS	BRI	MAR	TAL	CLT	DOV	POC	RSD	MCH	DAY	POC	TAL	GLN	MCH	BRI	DAR	RCH	DOV	MAR	NWS	CLT	CAR	RSD; 41	ATL	118th	NA	
1988	Steurer Racing	81W	Chevy	DAY	RCH	CAR	ATL	DAR	BRI	NWS	MAR	TAL	CLT	DOV	RSD; DNQ	POC	MCH	DAY	POC	TAL	GLN	MCH	BRI	DAR	RCH	DOV	MAR	CLT	NWS	CAR	PHO	ATL	124th	0	

==== Winston West Series ====
NASCAR Winston West Series results
Year	Team	No.	Make	1	2	3	4	5	6	7	8	9	10	11	12	13	14	15	16	17	18	19	20	NWWSC	Pts	Ref
1977	Steurer Racing	8	Chevy	RSD	LAG	ONT; 8	SJS	MMR	ASP	RSD														42nd	164.25	
1977	Steurer Racing	18	Chevy								SGS; 6	YAK	EVG	WSP	USP	POR	AAS	CRS	ASP	SHA	POR	ONT	PHO	42nd	164.25	
1985	Steurer Racing	18	Chevy	SON; 3		RSD; 11		SIR; 4			YAK; 7		WSR; 7		RSD; 11									4th	543	
1985	Steurer Racing	18	Buick		SHA; 5		MMR; 14		POR; 4	STA; 10		EVG; 8		MMR; 3										4th	543	
1986	Steurer Racing	18	Chevy	SON; 7	RSD; 10	EVG; 9	RCS; 13		PIR; 28	WSR; 4	RSD; 16													7th	342	
1986	Steurer Racing	18	Buick					TAC; 20																7th	342	
1987	Steurer Racing	18	Chevy	SON; 17	RSD	SGP	EVG	POR			RSD; 41													18th	168	
1987	Steurer Racing	18	Buick						**TAC**; 3	MMR; 5														18th	168	
1988	Steurer Racing	18	Chevy	**SON**; 5	MMR; 5				EVG; 12	MMR; 17	PHO													13th	237	
1988	Steurer Racing	81	Chevy			RSD; DNQ																		13th	237	
1988	Steurer Racing	18	Buick				SGP; 14	POR																13th	237	
1990	Steurer Racing	18	Buick	MMR; 12	SON	SGS	POR	EVG	RAS	TCR	MMR	PHO												38th	138	
1991	Steurer Racing	18	Buick	EVG	MMR	SON	SGS	POR	EVG; 30	SSS	MMR	PHO												54th	73	
