= Ted Kennedy (racing driver) =

American racing driver (born 1955)

- Born: December 7, 1955 (age 70); Fresno, California, U.S.

NASCAR Cup Series career
- 3 races run over 2 years
- Best finish: 74th (1986)
- First race: 1986 Budweiser 400 (Riverside)
- Last race: 1990 Banquet Frozen Foods 300 (Sonoma)
| Wins | Top tens | Poles |
|---|---|---|
| 0 | 0 | 0 |

ARCA Menards Series West career
- 10 races run over 5 years
- Best finish: 20th (1990)
- First race: 1986 Budweiser 400 (Riverside)
- Last race: 1992 Winston October Classic (Mesa Marin)
| Wins | Top tens | Poles |
|---|---|---|
| 0 | 2 | 0 |
- Statistics up to date as of May 9, 2025.

Ted Kennedy (born December 7, 1955) is an American former professional stock car racing driver. He competed in the NASCAR Winston Cup Series, NASCAR Winston West Series, and NASCAR Southwest Tour.

Kennedy became a crew chief after his racing career.

== Racing career ==
=== NASCAR Winston Cup Series ===
Kennedy made his NASCAR Winston Cup Series debut in the 1986 Budweiser 400 at Riverside International Raceway, a combination race with the NASCAR Winston West Series, where he finished 23rd. He would compete in the second Riverside race later in the year, finishing 30th after a transmission issue took him out of the race. He did not return to the series until 1990, again attempting both combination races, finishing 43rd at Sears Point Raceway and failing to qualify for the race at Phoenix International Raceway.

=== NASCAR Winston West Series ===
Kennedy's Winston Cup debut was also his NASCAR Winston West Series debut. He competed in two other races in 1986, but failed to finish both of them. Kennedy's next appearance in the series came in the 1989 Spears Manufacturing 200, where he finished twentieth after crashing out. He competed in three races in 1990, as well as attempting another, and scored his first career top-ten with a sixth place result at Mesa Marin Raceway. Kennedy competed in two events in 1991, including driving for four time champion Bill Schmitt at Evergreen Speedway, but failed to finish both races. Kennedy's final start came at Mesa Marin in 1992, where he finished ninth.

=== NASCAR Southwest Tour ===
Kennedy competed in nine NASCAR Southwest Tour races between 1986 and 1990, scoring three top ten finishes.

== Motorsports career results ==
=== NASCAR ===
(key) (Bold – Pole position awarded by qualifying time. Italics – Pole position earned by points standings or practice time. * – Most laps led.)

==== Winston Cup Series ====
NASCAR Winston Cup Series results
| Year | Team | No. | Make | 1 | 2 | 3 | 4 | 5 | 6 | 7 | 8 | 9 | 10 | 11 | 12 | 13 | 14 | 15 | 16 | 17 | 18 | 19 | 20 | 21 | 22 | 23 | 24 | 25 | 26 | 27 | 28 | 29 | NWCC | Pts | Ref |
|---|---|---|---|---|---|---|---|---|---|---|---|---|---|---|---|---|---|---|---|---|---|---|---|---|---|---|---|---|---|---|---|---|---|---|---|
| 1986 | Stoke Racing | 99 | Chevy | DAY | RCH | CAR | ATL | BRI | DAR | NWS | MAR | TAL | DOV | CLT | RSD; 23 | POC | MCH | DAY | POC | TAL | GLN | MCH | BRI | DAR | RCH | DOV | MAR | NWS | CLT | CAR | ATL | RSD; 30 | 74th | 167 | |
| 1990 | Emerson Racing | 34 | Olds | DAY | RCH | CAR | ATL | DAR | BRI | NWS | MAR | TAL | CLT | DOV | SON; 43 | POC | MCH | DAY | POC | TAL | GLN | MCH | BRI | DAR | RCH | DOV | MAR | NWS | CLT | CAR | PHO; DNQ | ATL | 104th | 34 | |

==== Winston West Series ====
NASCAR Winston West Series results
| Year | Team | No. | Make | 1 | 2 | 3 | 4 | 5 | 6 | 7 | 8 | 9 | 10 | 11 | NWWC | Pts | Ref |
|---|---|---|---|---|---|---|---|---|---|---|---|---|---|---|---|---|---|
| 1986 | Stoke Racing | 99 | Chevy | SON | RSD; 23 | EVG | RCS | TAC; 21 | PIR | WSR | RSD; 30 | | | | 23rd | 119 | |
| 1989 | Puskarich Racing | 13 | Olds | MAD | MMR; 20 | RAS | SON | POR | TCR | EVG | MMR | SGS | SON | PHO | 44th | 103 | |
| 1990 | Emerson Racing | 34 | Olds | MMR; 6 | SON; 43 | SGS | POR | EVG | RAS | TCR | MMR; 16 | PHO; DNQ | | | 20th | 519 | |
| 1991 | Schmitt Motorsports | 78 | Ford | EVG | MMR | SON | SGS | POR | EVG; 33 | SSS | | | | | 38th | 194 | |
| 1991 | Emerson Racing | 34 | Olds | | | | | | | | MMR; 11 | PHO | | | 38th | 194 | |
| 1992 | Emerson Racing | 34 | Olds | MMR | SGS | SON | SHA | POR | EVG | SSS | CAJ | TWS | MMR; 9 | PHO | 38th | 143 | |
