= 1990 Winston 200 =

1990 Winston 200 may refer to:

- 1990 Winston 200 (Portland, Oregon)
- 1990 Winston 200 (Saugus, California)
