= Robert Sprague (racing driver) =

American racing driver (born 1959)

- Born: December 26, 1959 (age 66); North Bend, Oregon, U.S.

NASCAR Cup Series career
- 1 race run over 1 year
- Best finish: 86th (1991)
- First race: 1991 Banquet Frozen Foods 300 (Sonoma)
Wins	Top tens	Poles
0	0	0

ARCA Menards Series West career
- 34 races run over 6 years
- Best finish: 6th (1990)
- First race: 1989 Budweiser 200 (Madera)
- Last race: 1994 Talk N' Toss 200 (Portland)
Wins	Top tens	Poles
0	20	0
- Statistics up to date as of April 3, 2025.

Robert Sprague (born December 26, 1959) is an American former professional stock car racing driver. He competed in the NASCAR Winston Cup Series and NASCAR Winston West Series.

== Racing career ==
=== NASCAR Winston Cup Series ===
Sprague attempted races in the NASCAR Winston Cup Series between 1989 and 1994, making one race at Sears Point International Raceway in 1991, where he led a lap but finished 39th due to engine issues. He failed to qualify for four other events, including the 1994 Brickyard 400.

=== NASCAR Winston West Series ===
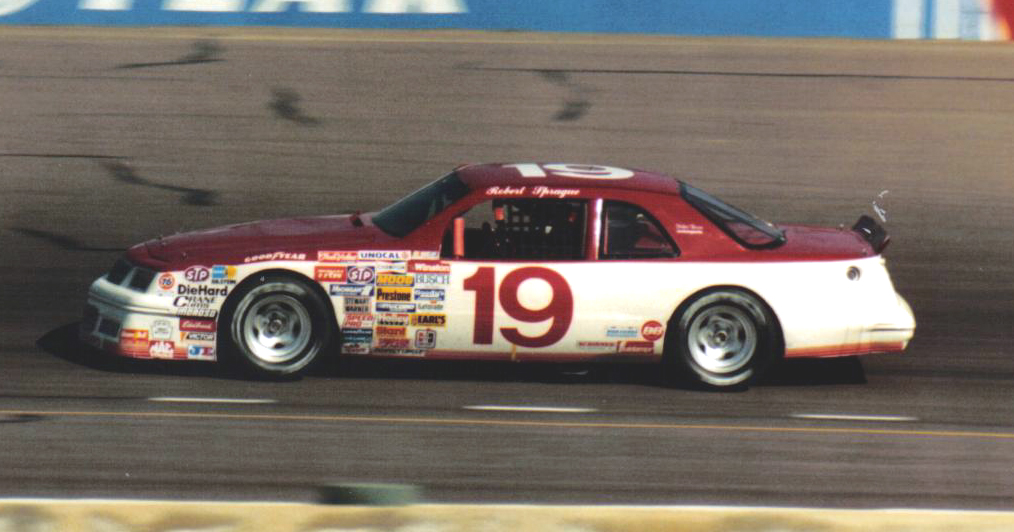
Sprague during qualifying at Phoenix International Raceway in 1989

Sprague attempted nearly the entire 1989 NASCAR Winston West Series season, skipping only the fourth race of the season, and failing to qualify for the Winston Cup Series combination race finale. He attempted most of the 1990 season, only skipping the season's second race, and he again failed to qualify for the finale. Sprague ran the full season in 1991, although he did not start the season opener at Evergreen Speedway and failed to qualify for the finale at Phoenix Raceway. Sprague only ran three races in 1992, running the fourth, fifth, and sixth races of the year. He increased his schedule to five races in 1993 and scored a career-best third place finish at both Coos Bay Speedway and South Sound Speedway. Sprague's final starts in the series came in 1994, where he ran three races, as well as attempting the inaugural Brickyard 400.

== Motorsport career results ==
=== NASCAR ===
(key) (Bold – Pole position awarded by qualifying time. Italics – Pole position earned by points standings or practice time. * – Most laps led.)

==== Winston Cup Series ====
NASCAR Winston Cup Series results
Year	Team	No.	Make	1	2	3	4	5	6	7	8	9	10	11	12	13	14	15	16	17	18	19	20	21	22	23	24	25	26	27	28	29	30	31	NWCC	Pts	Ref
1989	Rouse Racing	19	Ford	DAY	CAR	ATL	RCH	DAR	BRI	NWS	MAR	TAL	CLT	DOV	SON	POC	MCH	DAY	POC	TAL	GLN	MCH	BRI	DAR	RCH	DOV	MAR	CLT	NWS	CAR	PHO; DNQ	ATL			124th	0	
1990	Rouse Racing	91	Ford	DAY	RCH	CAR	ATL	DAR	BRI	NWS	MAR	TAL	CLT	DOV	SON	POC	MCH	DAY	POC	TAL	GLN	MCH	BRI	DAR	RCH	DOV	MAR	NWS	CLT	CAR	PHO; DNQ	ATL			129th	0	
1991	Rouse Racing	91	Ford	DAY	RCH	CAR	ATL	DAR	BRI	NWS	MAR	TAL	CLT	DOV	SON; 39	POC	MCH	DAY	POC	TAL	GLN	MCH	BRI	DAR	RCH	DOV	MAR	NWS	CLT	CAR	PHO; DNQ	ATL			86th	51	
1994	Bay Cities Motorsports	91W	Ford	DAY	CAR	RCH	ATL	DAR	BRI	NWS	MAR	TAL	SON	CLT	DOV	POC	MCH	DAY	NHA	POC	TAL	IND; DNQ	GLN	MCH	BRI	DAR	RCH	DOV	MAR	NWS	CLT	CAR	PHO	ATL	118th	0	

==== Winston Transcontinental Series ====
NASCAR Winston Transcontinental Series results
Year	Team	No.	Make	1	2	3	4	5	6	7	8	9	10	11	12	13	14	NWWC	Pts	Ref
1989	Unknown	65	Ford	MAD; 14	MMR; 14	RAS; 13	SON											8th	1344	
1989	Rouse Racing	19	Ford					POR; 6	TCR; 7	EVG; 21	MMR; 5	SGS; 10	SON; 9	PHO; DNQ				8th	1344	
1990	Rouse Racing	19	Ford	MMR; 5	SON	SGS; 4	POR; 8	EVG; 17	RAS; 5	TCR; 5	MMR; 18							6th	1128	
1990	Rouse Racing	91	Ford									PHO; DNQ						6th	1128	
1991	Rouse Racing	91	Ford	EVG; 24	MMR; 18	SON; 39	SGS; 7	POR; 4	EVG; 13	SSS; 5	MMR; 18	PHO; DNQ						8th	1173	
1992	Rouse Racing	91	Ford	MMR	SGS	SON	SHA; 6	POR; 11	EVG; 10	SSS	CAJ	TWS	MMR	PHO				17th	419	
1993	Bay Cities Motorsports	91	Ford	TWS	MMR	SGS	SON	TUS	SHA	EVG; 24	POR	CBS; 3	SSS; 3	CAJ	TCR; 6	MMR; 7	PHO	16th	717	
1994	Bay Cities Motorsports	91	Ford	MMR	TUS	SON	SGS	YAK; 4	MMR	POR; 21	IND; DNQ	CAJ	TCR	LVS	MMR	PHO	TUS	30th	389	
