= Bob Walker (racing driver) =

American racing driver (1946–2018)

- Born: Robert Walker; August 7, 1946; Hemet, California, U.S.
- Died: August 4, 2018 (aged 71); Myrtle Beach, South Carolina, U.S.

NASCAR Cup Series career
- Best finish: 119th (1989)

NASCAR FedEx Freight Truck Series career
- 2 races run over 1 year
- Best finish: 63rd (1995)
- First race: 1995 Scott Irvin Chevrolet/Craftsman 200 (Saugus)
- Last race: 1995 Ford Credit 125 (Mesa Marin)
Wins	Top tens	Poles
0	0	0

ARCA Menards Series West career
- 19 races run over 4 years
- Best finish: 9th (1989)
- First race: 1989 Budweiser 200 (Madera)
- Last race: 1992 Winston October Classic (Mesa Marin)
Wins	Top tens	Poles
0	8	0
- Statistics up to date as of April 2, 2025.

Robert "Bob" Walker (August 7, 1946 – August 4, 2018) was an American professional stock car racing driver. He competed in the NASCAR Winston Cup Series, NASCAR SuperTruck Series, NASCAR Winston West Series, and NASCAR Featherlite Southwest Tour.

== Racing career ==
=== NASCAR Winston Cup Series ===
Walker attempted to make three NASCAR Winston Cup Series races between 1989 and 1990, all of which were in combination with the Winston West Series. He failed to qualify for all three events.

=== NASCAR SuperTruck Series ===
Walker competed in the third and fourth races of the 1995 NASCAR SuperTruck Series season, finishing eighteenth at Saugus and 24th at Mesa Marin.

=== NASCAR Winston West Series ===
Walker competed in nineteen races in what is now the ARCA Menards Series West between 1989 and 1992. Walker attempted the full 1989 season, failing to qualify for both combination races with the Winston Cup Series and failing to finish all but three standalone events, although he scored a runner-up finish at Redwood Acres Speedway. Walker would finish ninth in the final standings. He attempted most of the 1990 season, failing to qualify for the combination race at Phoenix and tied his career best second place finish at Redwood Acres Speedway. In three races in 1991, Walker again tied his best finish of second, this time coming at Mesa Marin Raceway. He made his final start in the series in 1992, finishing 21st at Mesa Marin due to engine issues.

=== NASCAR Featherlite Southwest Tour ===
Walker competed in six NASCAR Featherlite Southwest Tour races between 1986 and 1989, as well as attempting another in 1991. He scored a best finish of tenth at Riverside International Raceway in 1987.

== Personal life ==
Born in Hemet, California, Walker later moved to Myrtle Beach, South Carolina. He owned Walker's Hot Rod Shop, where he produced custom built automobiles. Walker founded the Racing Brotherhood Foundation after Myrtle Beach Speedway lost seven drivers in two years. Walker had a wife and three children.

== Death ==
On August 4, 2018, Walker won a Vintage Modified Series race at Myrtle Beach Speedway. As he packed up his Ford, Walker had a medical emergency, dying from natural causes. The speedway's rescue squad had stabilized Walker, but he died prior to reaching the hospital.

== Motorsport career results ==
=== NASCAR ===
(key) (Bold – Pole position awarded by qualifying time. Italics – Pole position earned by points standings or practice time. * – Most laps led.)

==== Winston Cup Series ====
NASCAR Winston Cup Series results
Year	Team	No.	Make	1	2	3	4	5	6	7	8	9	10	11	12	13	14	15	16	17	18	19	20	21	22	23	24	25	26	27	28	29	NWCC	Pts	Ref
1989	Bob Walker Racing	80	Pontiac	DAY	CAR	ATL	RCH	DAR	BRI	NWS	MAR	TAL	CLT	DOV	SON; DNQ	POC	MCH	DAY	POC	TAL	GLN	MCH	BRI	DAR	RCH	DOV	MAR	CLT	NWS	CAR	PHO; DNQ	ATL	119th	0	
1990	Bob Walker Racing	88	Chevy	DAY	RCH	CAR	ATL	DAR	BRI	NWS	MAR	TAL	CLT	DOV	SON	POC	MCH	DAY	POC	TAL	GLN	MCH	BRI	DAR	RCH	DOV	MAR	NWS	CLT	CAR	PHO; DNQ	ATL	128th	0	

==== SuperTruck Series ====
NASCAR SuperTruck Series results
Year	Team	No.	Make	1	2	3	4	5	6	7	8	9	10	11	12	13	14	15	16	17	18	19	20	NSTC	Pts	Ref
1995	Flores Racing	57	Chevy	PHO	TUS	SGS; 18	MMR; 24	POR	EVG	I70	LVL	BRI	MLW	CNS	HPT	IRP	FLM	RCH	MAR	NWS	SON	MMR	PHO	63rd	200	

==== Winston West Series ====
NASCAR Winston West Series results
Year	Team	No.	Make	1	2	3	4	5	6	7	8	9	10	11	NWWC	Pts	Ref
1989	Bob Walker Racing	88	Pontiac	MAD; 11	MMR; 22	RAS; 2	SON; DNQ	POR; 21	TCR; 17	EVG; 19	MMR; 10	SGS; 11	SON; 21		9th	1334	
1989	Bob Walker Racing	80	Pontiac											PHO; DNQ	9th	1334	
1990	Bob Walker Racing	88	Pontiac	MMR; 7	SON	SGS; 15	POR; 10	EVG	RAS; 2	TCR; 20	MMR; 6				10th	947	
1990	Bob Walker Racing	88	Chevy									PHO; DNQ			10th	947	
1991	Bob Walker Racing	88	Pontiac	EVG	MMR; 2	SON	SGS; 6	POR	EVG; 25	SSS	MMR	PHO			23rd	408	
1992	Bob Walker Racing	88	Pontiac	MMR	SGS	SON	SHA	POR	EVG	SSS	CAJ	TWS	MMR; 21	PHO	50th	100	
