= 1990 NASCAR Winston West Series =

37th season of the NASCAR Winston West Series

Seasons
- ← 1989 1991 →

The 1990 NASCAR Winston West Series was the 37th season of the series. The title was won by Bill Schmitt, his fourth in the series and second in succession. Schmitt won the championship by just 1 point over Bill Sedgwick.

== Teams and drivers ==
=== Complete schedule ===
| Manufacturer | Team | No. | Driver |
|---|---|---|---|
| Buick | Adele Emerson | 44 | Jack Sellers |
| Buick | Don Freymiller | 23 | Mike Chase |
| Buick | St. James Racing | 22 | St. James Davis |
| Chevrolet | Gilliland Racing | 24 | Butch Gilliland |
| Chevrolet | Schmitt Racing | 73 | Bill Schmitt |
| Chevrolet | Spears Motorsports | 75 | Bill Sedgwick |
| Pontiac | Krebs Racing | 99 | John Krebs |
| Pontiac 4 Chevrolet 3 Oldsmobile 2 | Midgley Racing | 09 | Terry Fisher |

=== Limited schedule ===
| Manufacturer | Team | No. | Driver | Races |
|---|---|---|---|---|
| Buick | Beebe Racing | 93 | Troy Beebe | 2 |
| Buick | Glen Steurer | 18 | Glen Steurer | 1 |
| Buick | Jack Sellers Racing | 8 | Chuck Welch | 1 |
| Buick | Jack Sellers Racing | 8 | Ron Hornaday Jr. | 1 |
| Buick | Sara Vincent | 41 | Chuck Welch | 1 |
| Chevrolet | Bob Whitcomb Racing | 10 | Derrike Cope | 3 |
| Chevrolet | Gerald Smith | 69 | Brent Kaeding | 1 |
| Chevrolet | Jack Sellers Racing | 08 | Dick Gaboury | 1 |
| Chevrolet | Jack Sellers Racing | 08 | Troy Beebe | 1 |
| Chevrolet | Kieper Racing | 10 | Jim Bown | 1 |
| Chevrolet | Kieper Racing | 98 | Jerry Bowers | 1 |
| Chevrolet | Kieper Racing | 98 | Jim Bown | 1 |
| Chevrolet | Reed Racing | 72 | Mark Reed | 2 |
| Chevrolet | Rick Scribner | 15 | Rick Scribner | 5 |
| Chevrolet | Schmitt Racing | 78 | P. J. Jones | 1 |
| Chevrolet | Tidrick Racing | 27 | Gary Scott | 3 |
| Chevrolet | Tidrick Racing | 72 | Brad Tidrick | 3 |
| Chevrolet | Tim McCauley | 0 | Tim McCauley | 2 |
| Chevrolet | Unknown | 87 | Mike Nicholson | 4 |
| Chevrolet | Unknown | 08 | John Clayton | 1 |
| Ford | Autosport Enterprises Inc. | 79 | Roy Smith | 5 |
| Ford | Chuck Little | 18 | Chad Little | 1 |
| Ford | Melling Racing | 9 | Bill Elliott | 3 |
| Ford | Rabanco Racing | 70 | L. J. Pryor | 2 |
| Ford | Rouse Racing | 9 | J. C. Danielsen | 6 |
| Ford | Rouse Racing | 19 | Robert Sprague | 8 |
| Oldsmobile | Adele Emerson | 34 | Ted Kennedy | 4 |
| Oldsmobile | Collins Motorsports | 28 | Gary Collins | 5 |
| Oldsmobile | French Racing | 14 | Mike French | 3 |
| Oldsmobile | Larry Gaylord | 68 | Larry Gaylord | 3 |
| Oldsmobile | S&S Racing | 05 | Randy Becker | 1 |
| Oldsmobile | Tom Hathaway | 89 | Bob Howard | 3 |
| Oldsmobile | Unknown | 05 | Will Harper | 1 |
| Pontiac | Bob Lipseia | 04 | Hershel McGriff | 6 |
| Pontiac | Eaton Racing | 7 | Ron Eaton | 1 |
| Pontiac | Gunselman Racing | 07 | Larry Gunselman | 1 |
| Pontiac | Hickingbottom Racing | 77 | Mike Hickingbottom | 6 |
| Pontiac | Hoenshell Racing | 38 | Duke Hoenshell | 1 |
| Pontiac | Ray Kelly | 74 | Ray Kelly | 1 |
| Pontiac | Rick McCray | 08 | Rick McCray | 1 |
| Pontiac | Unknown | 07 | Mark Walbridge | 3 |
| Buick 2 Chevrolet 2 | Adele Emerson | 8 | Chuck Welch | 4 |
| Pontiac 7 Chevrolet 1 | Rick Mackey | 33 | Rick Mackey | 8 |
| Pontiac 6 Chevrolet 1 | Bob Walker Racing | 88 | Bob Walker | 7 |

== Schedule and results ==
The 1990 season included 9 individual races, although Mesa Marin Raceway hosted two races. The races at Sears Point International Raceway and Phoenix International Raceway were in combination with the NASCAR Winston Cup Series.

| Date | Name | Racetrack | Location | Winner |
|---|---|---|---|---|
| May 20 | Spears Manufacturing 400 | Mesa Marin Raceway | Bakersfield, California | Bill Sedgwick |
| June 10 | Banquet Frozen Foods 300 | Sears Point International Raceway | Sonoma, California | Rusty Wallace |
| June 16 | Winston 200 | Saugus Speedway | Saugus, California | Bill Sedgwick |
| July 1 | Winston 200 | Portland Speedway | Portland, Oregon | Roy Smith |
| July 15 | Motorcraft 500 | Evergreen Speedway | Monroe, Washington | Bill Sedgwick |
| August 25 | Six Rivers National Bank 200 | Redwood Acres Speedway | Eureka, California | Bill Sedgwick |
| September 30 | Miller Genuine Draft 200 | Tri-City Raceway | West Richland, Washington | Roy Smith |
| October 14 | Spears Manufacturing 400 | Mesa Marin Raceway | Bakersfield, California | Mike Chase |
| November 4 | Checker 500 | Phoenix International Raceway | Avondale, Arizona | Dale Earnhardt |

=== Spears Manufacturing 400 (May) ===
The Spears Manufacturing 400 was held on May 20 at Mesa Marin Raceway. Bill Sedgwick won the pole.

Top Ten Results

1. 75 - Bill Sedgwick
2. 28 - Gary Collins
3. 09 - Terry Fisher
4. 98 - Jerry Bowers
5. 19 - Robert Sprague -3
6. 34 - Ted Kennedy -4
7. 88 - Bob Walker -4
8. 04 - Hershel McGriff -5
9. 07 - Mark Walbridge -9
10. 24 - Butch Gilliland -9
- Bill Sedgwick started the season with a win, leading 254 of the 400 laps. Bill Schmitt, who led 62 laps, fell out with engine issues halfway through the race. Six other drivers took turns at the front of the field, but Sedgwick was able to prevail by 2.85 second over Gary Collins.
- It was the only standalone West race of the season where a driver failed to qualify, as Rick Mackey would not make the field.

=== Banquet Frozen Foods 300 ===
The Banquet Frozen Foods 300 was held on June 10 at Sears Point International Raceway and was the first of two combination races with the NASCAR Winston Cup Series. Ricky Rudd won the pole.

Top Ten Results

1. 27 - Rusty Wallace
2. 6 - Mark Martin
3. 5 - Ricky Rudd
4. 11 - Geoff Bodine
5. 8 - Bobby Hillin Jr.
6. 94 - Sterling Marlin
7. 4 - Ernie Irvan
8. 0 - Irv Hoerr
9. 30 - Michael Waltrip
10. 75 - Rick Wilson

Failed to qualify: 52 - Jimmy Means, J. C. Danielsen, 22 - St. James Davis, Mike Hickingbottom

- Rusty Wallace continued his Winston Cup road course mastery in earning his second win of the season at Sears Point. It was his fifth road course win in the last seven, finishing second in the other two. Wallace overtook Ricky Rudd on the 11th turn on lap 60 and led the rest of the way, beating Mark Martin to the caution on lap 73, earning the win under caution in the final lap. Martin overtook the Winston Cup points race at 1800, while Terry Fisher moved to the Winston West points lead.
- This was the final race victory for Blue Max Racing, as the team would fold after Wallace left the team at the end of 1990, and Roger Penske would acquire their equipment and hire Wallace starting in 1991.
- Terry Fisher was the highest finishing West Series driver, coming home 15th overall and scoring points equivalent to a win. As previously mentioned, Fisher would take the points lead, leaving Sonoma with a 14 point lead over Bill Sedgwick.

=== Winston 200 (Saugus) ===
The Winston 200 was held on June 16 at Saugus Speedway. Bill Sedgwick won the pole.

Top Ten Results

1. 75 - Bill Sedgwick
2. 73 - Bill Schmitt
3. 99 - John Krebs
4. 19 - Robert Sprague -1
5. 04 - Hershel McGriff -1
6. 23 - Mike Chase -1
7. 9 - J. C. Danielsen -1
8. 09 - Terry Fisher -2
9. 28 - Gary Collins -2
10. 24 - Butch Gilliland -2
- Bill Sedgwick scored his second win of the season, leading all 200 laps. He would retake the points leader from Terry Fisher, who would be 29 points behind after his eighth place finish.

=== Winston 200 (Portland) ===
The Winston 200 was held on July 1 at Portland Speedway. Mike Chase won the pole.

Top Ten Results

1. 79 - Roy Smith
2. 73 - Bill Schmitt
3. 75 - Bill Sedgwick
4. 10 - Derrike Cope
5. 24 - Butch Gilliland
6. 04 - Hershel McGriff
7. 23 - Mike Chase
8. 19 - Robert Sprague -4
9. 33 - Rick Mackey -6
10. 88 - Bob Walker -7
- Roy Smith, in his second start of the season, would score his first win of the season, leading only 23 of the race's 200 laps.
- Bill Sedgwick would grow his points lead, leading Portland with a 71 point advantage over Bill Schmitt, who surpassed Terry Fisher and left Portland with a 3 point advantage over him.
- This was the last standalone West race Derrike Cope would compete in.

=== Motorcraft 500 ===
The Motorcaft 500 was held on July 15 at Evergreen Speedway. Winston Cup driver Bill Elliott won the pole.

Top Ten Results

1. 75 - Bill Sedgwick
2. 9 - Bill Elliott
3. 73 - Bill Schmitt
4. 23 - Mike Chase -1
5. 09 - Terry Fisher -4
6. 87 - Mike Nicholson -14
7. 89 - Bob Howard -15
8. 33 - Rick Mackey -30
9. 79 - Roy Smith -31
10. 72 - Brad Tidrick -33
- Bill Sedgwick scored his third win of the season, beating polesitter and 1988 NASCAR Winston Cup Series champion Bill Elliott by 0.67 seconds.
- Sedgwick maintained his points lead over Bill Schmitt, who was 76 points behind after the race. Terry Fisher maintained third, however was now 99 points behind Sedgwick.

=== Six Rivers National Bank 200 ===
The Six Rivers National Bank 200 was held on August 25 at Redwood Acres Speedway. Jim Bown won the pole.

Top Ten Results

1. 75 - Bill Sedgwick
2. 88 - Bob Walker
3. 9 - J. C. Danielsen
4. 24 - Butch Gilliland
5. 19 - Robert Sprague -2
6. 23 - Mike Chase -2
7. 09 - Terry Fisher -5
8. 44 - Jack Sellers -28
9. 33 - Rick Mackey -33
10. 99 - John Krebs -35
- Bill Sedgwick scored his fourth and final win of the season, and his second in a row. He led 179 of the race's 200 laps, with the other 21 being led by polesitter Jim Bown, who fell out of the race with overheating issues after 129 laps.
- Sedgwick expanded his points lead to 134 points over Bill Schmitt. Schmitt stayed just 4 points ahead of Terry Fisher.

=== Miller Genuine Draft 200 ===
The Miller Genuine Draft 200 was held on September 30 at Tri-City Raceway. Bill Sedgwick won the pole.

Top Ten Results

1. 79 - Roy Smith
2. 23 - Mike Chase
3. 73 - Bill Schmitt
4. 09 - Terry Fisher
5. 19 - Robert Sprague
6. 99 - John Krebs
7. 72 - Brad Tidrick -2
8. 44 - Jack Sellers -2
9. 10 - Jim Bown -3
10. 70 - L. J. Pryor -4
- Roy Smith scored his second win of the season and the final of his career.
- Bill Sedgwick had engine issues late in the race and finished 16th, allowing Bill Schmitt to gain in the standings, leaving Tri-City with an 84 point deficit.

=== Spears Manufacturing 400 (October) ===
The Spears Manufacturing 400 was held on October 14 at Mesa Marin Raceway. Bill Sedgwick won the pole.

Top Ten Results

1. 23 - Mike Chase
2. 73 - Bill Schmitt
3. 79 - Roy Smith
4. 99 - John Krebs -4
5. 87 - Mike Nicholson -9
6. 88 - Bob Walker -10
7. 33 - Rick Mackey -25
8. 05 - Will Harper -28
9. 15 - Rick Scribner -36
10. 24 - Butch Gilliland -48
- Mike Chase scored his first career win, winning by 1.3 seconds over Bill Schmitt.
- John Krebs got credit for fourth, although he required relief from Robert Sprague, who had fallen out of the race early with engine issues.
- After starting on pole, Bill Sedgwick only completed five laps before engine issues sent him out of the race and he finished 22nd. Terry Fisher failed to start the race and was given credit for 24th place.
- Sedgwick's points lead was cut to just 6 points after Schmitt led the most laps and finished second. Fisher finally lost third in points, as Chase was able to move into third, only 34 points behind Sedgwick.

=== Checker 500 ===
The Checker 500 was held on November 4 at Phoenix International Raceway and was the second of two combination races with the NASCAR Winston Cup Series. Rusty Wallace won the pole.

Top Ten Results

1. 3 - Dale Earnhardt
2. 25 - Ken Schrader
3. 15 - Morgan Shepherd
4. 17 - Darrell Waltrip
5. 9 - Bill Elliott
6. 7 - Alan Kulwicki
7. 98 - Rick Mast
8. 11 - Geoff Bodine
9. 4 - Ernie Irvan
10. 6 - Mark Martin

Failed to qualify: 04 - Hershel McGriff, 34 - Ted Kennedy, 24 - Butch Gilliland, 61 - Rick Scribner, 44 - Jack Sellers, 22 - St. James Davis, 09 - Terry Fisher, 36 - Rick Mackey, 56 - Ron Esau, 88 - Bob Walker

- Dale Earnhardt won his first (and only) race at Phoenix in a dominant fashion, leading 262 laps of 312 laps. He also took the Cup points lead by 6 points over Mark Martin heading into the season finale at Atlanta.
- Bill Schmitt was the highest finishing West driver and received points equivalent to a win, taking the championship from Bill Sedgwick by one point. Mike Chase, who finished last of the West drivers who made the field, ended the season third in points, with Terry Fisher and John Krebs completing the top five in the standings.

== Full Drivers' Championship ==
(key) Bold – Pole position awarded by time. Italics – Pole position set by owner's points. * – Most laps led. † – Ineligible for West Series points

| Pos | Driver | MMR | SON | SGS | POR | EVG | RAS | TCR | MMR | PHO | Pts |
|---|---|---|---|---|---|---|---|---|---|---|---|
| 1 | Bill Schmitt | 21 | 20 | 2 | 2 | 3* | 12 | 3 | 2* | 18 | 1342 |
| 2 | Bill Sedgwick | **1*** | 36 | **1*** | 3* | 1 | 1* | **16** | **22** | 20 | 1341 |
| 3 | Mike Chase | 20 | 25 | 6 | **7** | 4 | 6 | 2* | 1 | 39 | 1278 |
| 4 | Terry Fisher | 3 | 15 | 8 | 11 | 5 | 7 | 4 | 24 | DNQ | 1205 |
| 5 | John Krebs | 15 | 23 | 3 | 13 | 16 | 10 | 6 | 4 | 31 | 1183 |
| 6 | Robert Sprague | 5 | | 4 | 8 | 17 | 5 | 5 | 18 | DNQ | 1128 |
| 7 | Butch Gilliland | 10 | 28 | 10 | 5 | 22 | 4 | 19 | 10 | DNQ | 1107 |
| 8 | Jack Sellers | 24 | 40 | 16 | 17 | 13 | 8 | 8 | 13 | DNQ | 1018 |
| 9 | Rick Mackey | DNQ | | 14 | 9 | 8 | 9 | 18 | 7 | DNQ | 994 |
| 10 | Bob Walker | 7 | | 15 | 10 | | 2 | 20 | 6 | DNQ | 947 |
| 11 | St. James Davis | 23 | DNQ | 17 | 21 | 12 | 17 | 17 | 19 | DNQ | 902 |
| 12 | Hershel McGriff | 8 | 44 | 5 | 6 | 23 | | | | DNQ | 814 |
| 13 | J.C. Danielsen | 13 | DNQ | 7 | 14 | 19 | 3 | | | | 792 |
| 14 | Roy Smith | 18 | | | 1 | 9 | | 1 | 3 | | 782 |
| 15 | Gary Collins | 2 | | 9 | 15 | | | | 14 | 33 | 712 |
| 16 | Mike Hickingbottom | 17 | DNQ | 12 | 19 | 21 | 15 | | | | 690 |
| 17 | Rick Scribner | | | | | 11 | 11 | 13 | 9 | DNQ | 640 |
| 18 | Chuck Welch | 25 | | | 24 | 25 | 18 | 21 | 17 | | 640 |
| 19 | Mike Nicholson | 14 | | | | 6 | 16 | 5 | | | 541 |
| 20 | Ted Kennedy | 6 | 43 | | | | | | 16 | DNQ | 519 |
| 21 | Bob Howard | 16 | | | | 7 | | | 11 | | 396 |
| 22 | Mark Walbridge | 9 | | 11 | 12 | | | | | | 395 |
| 23 | Brad Tidrick | | | | 18 | 10 | | 7 | | | 394 |
| 24 | Troy Beebe | | 30 | | | 24 | | | | 35 | 387 |
| 25 | Larry Gaylord | | | | 23 | 14 | | 12 | | | 342 |
| 26 | Gary Scott | | | | 20 | 18 | | 15 | | | 330 |
| 27 | Mike French | | | | | 20 | 14 | 22 | | | 321 |
| 28 | Mark Reed | | | | | | | | 15 | 34 | 273 |
| 29 | Jim Bown | | | | | | **13** | 9 | | | 272 |
| 30 | L.J. Pryor | | | | | | | 10 | 23 | | 228 |
| 31 | Tim McCauley | | | | | | | 14 | 20 | | 224 |
| 32 | Bill Elliott | | 21† | | | **2** | | | | 5† | 175 |
| 33 | Brent Kaeding | | | | | | | | | 29 | 165 |
| 34 | Jerry Bowers | 4 | | | | | | | | | 165 |
| 35 | Derrike Cope | | 13† | | 4 | | | | | 14† | 160 |
| 36 | Will Harper | | | | | | | | 8 | | 142 |
| 37 | Ron Esau | | | | | | | | | DNQ | 138 |
| 38 | Glen Steurer | 12 | | | | | | | | | 132 |
| 39 | Randy Becker | 11 | | | | | | | | | 130 |
| 40 | Larry Gunselman | | | | | | | 11 | | | 130 |
| 41 | John Clayton | | | | | | | | 12 | | 127 |
| 42 | Duke Hoenshell | | | 13 | | | | | | | 124 |
| 43 | Chad Little | | 37† | | | 15 | | | | 21† | 123 |
| 44 | Ron Eaton | | | | 16 | | | | | | 115 |
| 45 | Ron Hornaday Jr. | | | 18 | | | | | | | 109 |
| 46 | Ray Kelly | 19 | | | | | | | | | 106 |
| 47 | Rick McCray | 22 | | | | | | | | | 102 |
| 48 | P. J. Jones | | | | | | | | 21 | | 100 |
| 49 | Dick Gaboury | | | | 22 | | | | | | 97 |

== See also ==
- 1990 NASCAR Winston Cup Series
- 1990 NASCAR Busch Series
