= Jack Sellers =

American racing driver (1944–2016)

- Born: July 27, 1944; Sacramento, California, U.S.
- Died: October 24, 2016 (aged 72); Sacramento, California, U.S.

NASCAR Cup Series career
- 2 races run over 2 years
- Best finish: 93rd (1992)
- First race: 1990 Banquet Frozen Foods 300 (Sonoma)
- Last race: 1992 Save Mart 300K (Sonoma)
Wins	Top tens	Poles
0	0	0

ARCA Menards Series career
- 2 races run over 2 years
- Best finish: N/A
- First race: 1992 NASCAR/ARCA Texas World Speedway Shootout (Texas World)
- Last race: 1993 Western Auto Texas Shootout II (Texas World)
Wins	Top tens	Poles
0	0	0

ARCA Menards Series East career
- 6 races run over 3 years
- Best finish: 49th (2003)
- First race: 2003 New England 125 (New Hampshire)
- Last race: 2005 MBNA Race Points 150 (Dover)
Wins	Top tens	Poles
0	0	0

ARCA Menards Series West career
- 282 races run over 32 years
- Best finish: 5th (1993)
- First race: 1985 AC-Delco 200 (Sonoma)
- Last race: 2016 Toyota/NAPA Auto Parts 150 (Roseville)
Wins	Top tens	Poles
0	30	0
- Statistics up to date as of March 21, 2025.

Jack Sellers (July 27, 1944 – October 24, 2016) was an American professional stock car racing driver and team owner. Sellers was a long-time competitor in the NASCAR K&N Pro Series West, formerly known as the Winston West Series.

== Racing career ==
Sellers made his Winston Series West debut in 1985. He made his first start at Sonoma, driving a self-owned Oldsmobile. During his Rookie year Sellers raced part-time in the West Series. Sellers was sponsored by Coca-Cola as his family owned the Coca-Cola bottling plant in Sacramento. Sellers started racing full-time in 1987, qualifying for six of the eight races that season. He also scored his first top-ten finish, when he finished seventh at the Spokane Grand Prix Course. Sellers finished tenth in the point standings that season. In 1989, Sellers scored three top-ten finishes and finished seventh in the point standings. In 1990, Sellers led eight laps at Tri-City Raceway. It would be first and the only time in his career that he was the race leader. 1993 would turn out to be the best season of Sellers' career. He finished in the top-ten six times and finished fifth in the point standings.

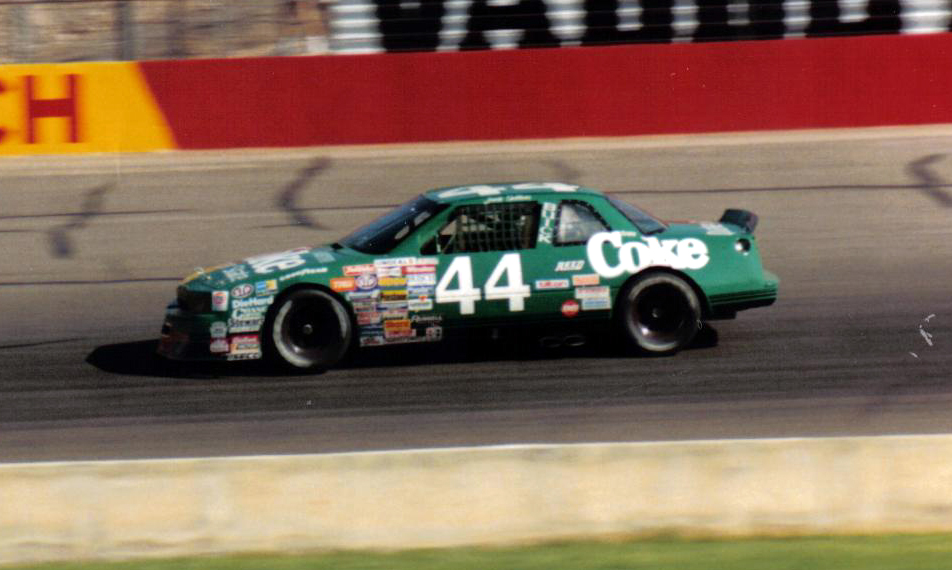
Sellers' 1989 racecar at Phoenix

During the late eighties and the early nineties Sellers attempted fifteen Winston Cup Series races. This was the era of “companion races,” where the two Winston Cup races at Sonoma and Phoenix invited drivers from the Winston West Series. After failing to qualify for the first six races he attempted, Sellers finally qualified for his first Winston Cup race at the 1990 Banquet Frozen Foods 300. Sellers drove a bright green Buick, a former Quaker State car that was driven by Ricky Rudd in his King Racing days. Sellers had a troubled debut as he had to put the car behind the wall due to an oil leak. After the car was repaired Sellers returned to the track but only a few laps later the car lost an engine in the Esses, spun 180 degrees, and backed hard into the tire barriers. Sellers repaired his car again and finished the race in fortieth place, albeit 33 laps behind the leaders. Two years later Sellers qualified for his second Winston Cup race, again at Sonoma. He qualified in the 43rd and final position. He retired from the race on lap 48 with transmission problems. Sellers also tried to qualify for the inaugural Brickyard 400 in 1994, but failed to make the race.

After 1994, Sellers continued to race in the West Series on a part-time basis. Scoring several top-ten finishes in 1995 and 1996. He cut down on his schedule after the 1996 season, only running eight races between 1997 and 1999. In 2000, he made a full-time return to the West Series, mostly running midpack. In 2002 at Kansas Speedway, Sellers scored his first top-ten finish in over five years. He continued to race full-time till the 2006 season. After that, Sellers ran most races every season but did not race full-time again until the 2014 season. That season, Sellers finished ninth in the points standings. He also scored his final career top-ten finish at Iowa Speedway. After the 2014 season Sellers reduced his schedule. He ran four races in the 2015, as well as the 2016 season. The final race of the 2016 season at All American Speedway would turn out to be the last start of Sellers' career. During his career Sellers entered over 300 West Series races and started a record 282 of them. He scored a total of 32 top-ten finishes. His best finish was seventh, a feat he accomplished six times.

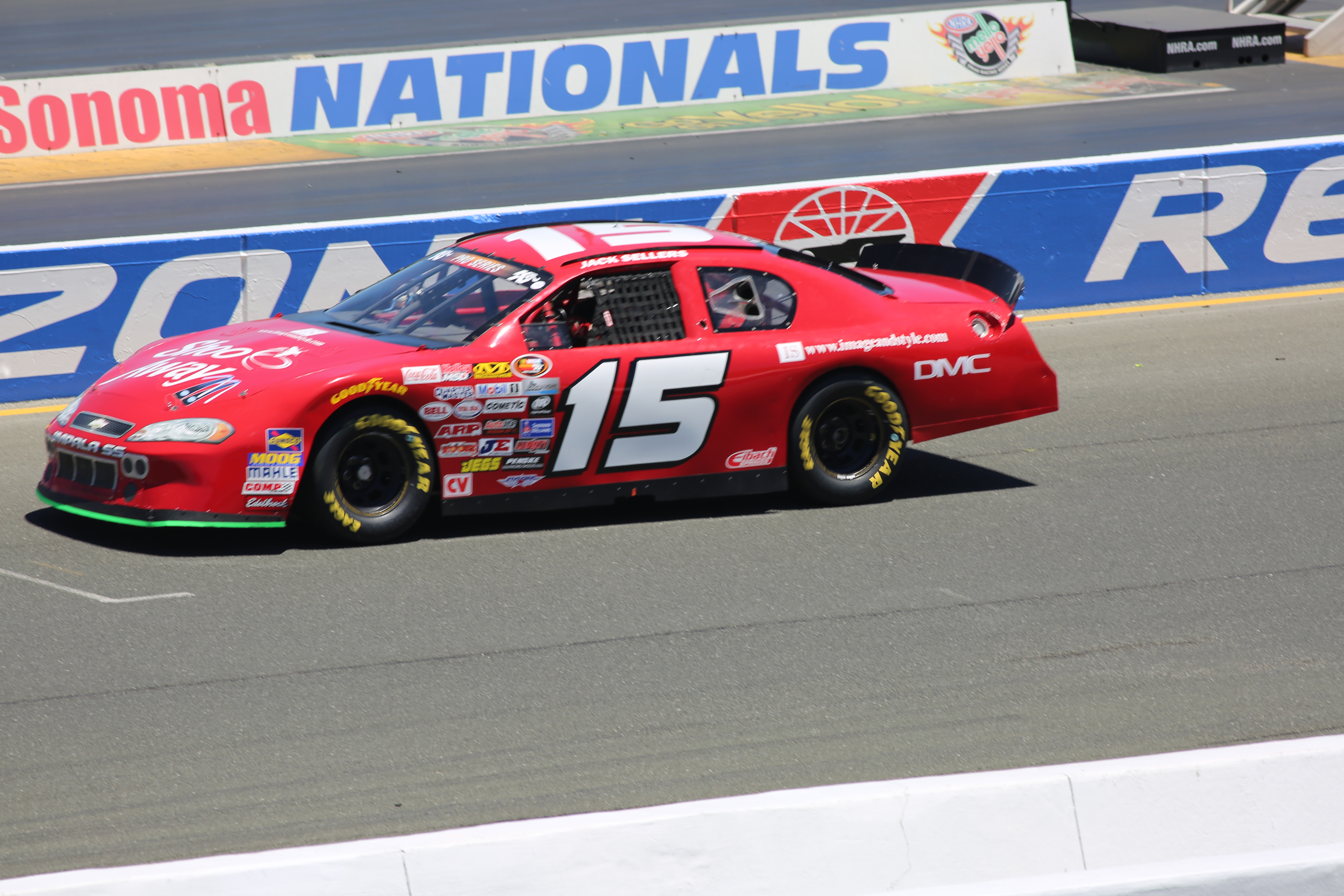
Sellers' 2016 racecar at Sonoma Raceway

In an interview in 2011, Sellers talked about his longevity in the West Series. “I never would have dreamed that I would go this far,” Sellers said with his familiar chuckle. “When you’ve been doing it so long, it’s not something that you can just quit.”

== Death ==
Sellers died at his ranch in Sacramento, California on October 24, 2016, aged 72. He had finished fourteenth at All-American Speedway in the 2016 K&N Pro Series West finale just a little over a week before.

== Motorsports career results ==
=== NASCAR ===
(key) (Bold – Pole position awarded by qualifying time. Italics – Pole position earned by points standings or practice time. * – Most laps led.)

==== Winston Cup Series ====
NASCAR Winston Cup Series results
Year	Team	No.	Make	1	2	3	4	5	6	7	8	9	10	11	12	13	14	15	16	17	18	19	20	21	22	23	24	25	26	27	28	29	30	31	NWCC	Pts	Ref
1987	Sara Vincent	41	Chevy	DAY	CAR	RCH	ATL	DAR	NWS	BRI	MAR	TAL	CLT	DOV	POC	RSD; DNQ	MCH	DAY	POC	TAL	GLN	MCH	BRI	DAR	RCH	DOV	MAR	NWS	CLT	CAR	RSD; DNQ	ATL			NA	-	
1988	Sara Vincent	41W	Chevy	DAY	RCH	CAR	ATL	DAR	BRI	NWS	MAR	TAL	CLT	DOV	RSD; DNQ	POC	MCH	DAY	POC	TAL	GLN	MCH	BRI	DAR	RCH	DOV	MAR	CLT	NWS	CAR	PHO; DNQ	ATL			NA	-	
1989	Adele Emerson	44	Buick	DAY	CAR	ATL	RCH	DAR	BRI	NWS	MAR	TAL	CLT	DOV	SON; DNQ	POC	MCH	DAY	POC	TAL	GLN	MCH	BRI	DAR	RCH	DOV	MAR	CLT	NWS	CAR	PHO; DNQ	ATL			NA	-	
1990	Adele Emerson	44	Buick	DAY	RCH	CAR	ATL	DAR	BRI	NWS	MAR	TAL	CLT	DOV	SON; 40	POC	MCH	DAY	POC	TAL	GLN	MCH	BRI	DAR	RCH	DOV	MAR	NWS	CLT	CAR	PHO; DNQ	ATL			106th	-	
1991	Adele Emerson	44	Buick	DAY	RCH	CAR	ATL	DAR	BRI	NWS	MAR	TAL	CLT	DOV	SON; DNQ	POC	MCH	DAY	POC	TAL	GLN	MCH	BRI	DAR	RCH	DOV	MAR	NWS	CLT	CAR	PHO; DNQ	ATL			NA	-	
1992	Adele Emerson	44	Buick	DAY	CAR	RCH	ATL	DAR	BRI	NWS	MAR	TAL	CLT	DOV	SON; 40	POC	MCH	DAY	POC	TAL	GLN	MCH	BRI	DAR	RCH	DOV	MAR	NWS	CLT	CAR	PHO	ATL			93rd	43	
1993	Adele Emerson	48	Buick	DAY	CAR	RCH	ATL	DAR	BRI	NWS	MAR	TAL	SON; DNQ	CLT	DOV	POC	MCH	DAY	NHA	POC	TAL	GLN	MCH	BRI	DAR	RCH	DOV	MAR	NWS	CLT	CAR				NA	-	
1993	Sellers Racing	48	Chevy																													PHO; DNQ	ATL		NA	-	
1994	Sellers Racing	48W	Chevy	DAY	CAR	RCH	ATL	DAR	BRI	NWS	MAR	TAL	SON; DNQ	CLT	DOV	POC	MCH	DAY	NHA	POC	TAL	IND; DNQ	GLN	MCH	BRI	DAR	RCH	DOV	MAR	NWS	CLT	CAR	PHO	ATL	NA	-	

==== Busch Series ====
NASCAR Busch Series results
Year	Team	No.	Make	1	2	3	4	5	6	7	8	9	10	11	12	13	14	15	16	17	18	19	20	21	22	23	24	25	26	27	28	29	30	31	32	33	34	NBSC	Pts	Ref
2002	Sellers Racing	15	Chevy	DAY	CAR	LVS	DAR	BRI	TEX	NSH	TAL	CAL; DNQ	RCH	NHA	NZH	CLT	DOV	NSH	KEN	MLW	DAY	CHI	GTY	PPR	IRP	MCH	BRI	DAR	RCH	DOV	KAN	CLT	MEM	ATL	CAR	PHO	HOM	NA	-	

==== K&N Pro Series East ====
NASCAR K&N Pro Series East results
Year	Team	No.	Make	1	2	3	4	5	6	7	8	9	10	11	12	13	14	15	16	17	NKNPSEC	Pts	Ref
2003	Sellers Racing	75	Chevy	LEE	STA	ERI	BEE	STA	HOL	TMP	NHA; 25	WFD	SEE	GLN; 24	ADI	BEE	THU	NHA; 39	STA	LRP	49th	225	
2004	Sellers Racing	75	Chevy	LEE	TMP	LRP	SEE	STA	HOL	ERI	WFD	NHA; 26	ADI	GLN	NHA	DOV					60th	85	
2005	Sellers Racing	75	Chevy	STA	HOL	ERI	NHA; 34	WFD	ADI	STA	DUB	OXF	NHA	DOV; 29	LRP	TMP					52nd	137	
2007	Sellers Racing	15	Chevy	GRE	ELK; DNQ	IOW; DNQ	SBO	STA	NHA	TMP	MCM	ADI	LRP	MFD	NHA	DOV					NA	-	
2011	Sellers Racing	1	Chevy	GRE	SBO	RCH	IOW; DNQ	BGS	JFC	LGY	NHA	COL	GRE	NHA	DOV						NA	-	
2012	Sellers Racing	15	Chevy	BRI	GRE	RCH	IOW; DNQ	BGS	JFC	LGY	CNB	COL	IOW	NHA	DOV	GRE	CAR				NA	-	

==== K&N Pro Series West ====
NASCAR K&N Pro Series West results
Year	Team	No.	Make	1	2	3	4	5	6	7	8	9	10	11	12	13	14	15	NKNPSWC	Pts	Ref
1985	Sellers Racing	6	Olds	SON; 20	SHA	RSD	MMR	SIR											17th	182	
1985	KC Racing	91	Olds						POR; 11	STA; 12	YAK	EVG; 19	WSR	MMR; 11	RSD				17th	182	
1986	Sara Vincent	41	Chevy	SON	RSD	EVG; 17	RCS; 14	TAC; 23	PIR; 26	WSR	RSD; DNQ								17th	150	
1987	Sara Vincent	41	Chevy	SON; 23	RSD; DNQ	SGP; 7	EVG; 13	POR; 21	TAC; 12	MMR; 15	RSD; DNQ								10th	277	
1988	Myung Suk Lee	45	Chevy	SON; 28															12th	260	
1988	Sara Vincent	41	Chevy		MMR; 10	RSD; DNQ	SGP; 11	POR; 12	EVG; 19	MMR; 25	PHO; DNQ								12th	260	
1989	Adele Emerson	44	Buick	MAD; 10	MMR; 19		SON; DNQ	POR; 14	TCR; 13	EVG; 13	MMR; 12	SGS; 8		PHO; DNQ					7th	1412	
1989	Adele Emerson	44	Chevy			RAS; 10							SON; 11						7th	1412	
1990	Adele Emerson	44	Buick	MMR; 24	SON; 40	SGS; 16	POR; 17	EVG; 13	RAS; 8	TCR; 8	MMR; 13	PHO; DNQ							8th	1018	
1991	Adele Emerson	44	Buick	EVG; 9	MMR; 11	SON; DNQ			EVG; 14	SSS; 13	MMR; 12	PHO; DNQ							10th	1106	
1991	Adele Emerson	8	Buick				SGS; 14	POR; 17											10th	1106	
1992	Adele Emerson	44	Buick	MMR; 9	SGS; 8	SON; 40	SHA; 14	POR; 12	EVG; 11	SSS; 8	CAJ; 13								8th	1290	
1992	Adele Emerson	44	Chevy									TWS; 33	MMR; 23	PHO					8th	1290	
1993	Sellers Racing	44	Pontiac	TWS; 42															5th	1833	
1993	Sellers Racing	48	Chevy		MMR; 15	SGS; 10	SON; DNQ	TUS; 10	SHA; 11	EVG; 15	POR; 10	CBS; 8	SSS; 8	CAJ; 13	TCR; 7	MMR; 13	PHO; DNQ		5th	1833	
1994	Sellers Racing	48	Chevy	MMR; 21	TUS; 22	SON; DNQ	SGS; 13	YAK; 15	MMR; 13	POR; 12	IND; DNQ	CAJ; 9	TCR; 7	LVS; 16	MMR; 9	PHO			8th	1611	
1994	Sellers Racing	48	Pontiac														TUS; 11		8th	1611	
1995	Sellers Racing	48	Chevy	TUS; 8	MMR; 19	SON	CNS; 9	MMR; 20	POR	SGS	TUS	AMP; 18	MAD; 11	POR; 13	LVS; 19	SON; 18	MMR; 19	PHO	12th	1173	
1996	Sellers Racing	48	Chevy	TUS; 17	AMP; 23	MMR	SON	MAD; 9	POR; 14	TUS; 9	EVG; 18	CNS; 13	MAD; 7	MMR; 11	SON; 17	MMR; 18	PHO	LVS	12th	1333	
1997	Sellers Racing	48	Chevy	TUS	AMP; 14	SON	TUS	MMR	LVS	CAL	EVG	POR	PPR	AMP; 8	SON; 17	MMR	LVS		32nd	375	
1998	Sellers Racing	15	Chevy	TUS	LVS	PHO	CAL	HPT	MMR	AMP; DNQ	POR	CAL	PPR	EVG; 22	SON	MMR; 25	LVS		55th	185	
1999	Sellers Racing	15	Chevy	TUS	LVS	PHO	CAL	PPR	MMR; 23	IRW	EVG	POR	IRW; 23	RMR	LVS; 29	MMR	MOT		46th	264	
2000	Sellers Racing	15	Chevy	PHO; 15	MMR; 25	LVS; 15	CAL; 30	LAG; 19	IRW; 16	POR; 17	EVG; 13	IRW; 25	RMR; 17	MMR; 14	IRW; 28				16th	1254	
2001	Sellers Racing	15	Chevy	PHO; 22	LVS; DNQ	TUS; 16	MMR; 27	CAL; 16	IRW; 19	LAG; 23	KAN; 12	EVG; 22	CNS; 12	IRW; DNQ	RMR; 13	LVS; 14	IRW; 23		15th	1463	
2002	Sellers Racing	15	Chevy	PHO; 21	LVS; 13	CAL; 13		EVG; 18	IRW; 20	S99; 13	RMR; 20	DCS; 12	LVS; 27						12th	1142	
2002	Sellers Racing	15	Pontiac				KAN; 7												12th	1142	
2003	Sellers Racing	15	Chevy	PHO; 16	LVS; 12		MAD; 13	TCR; 16		IRW; 18				PHO; 21					11th	1323	
2003	Sellers Racing	15	Pontiac			CAL; 18			EVG; 20		S99; 17	RMR; 17	DCS; 17						11th	1323	
2003	KC Racing	91	Pontiac												MMR; 26				11th	1323	
2004	Sellers Racing	15	Chevy	PHO; 24															13th	1427	
2004	Sellers Racing	75	Pontiac		MMR; 22			EVG; 16	IRW; 19				PHO; 12		MMR; 15				13th	1427	
2004	Sellers Racing	15	Pontiac			CAL; 25	S99; 16			S99; 10	RMR; 16	DCS; 17		CNS; 18		IRW; 21			13th	1427	
2005	Sellers Racing	75	Pontiac	PHO; 25	MMR; 11	PHO; 18						CAL; 25			MMR; 24				13th	1278	
2005	Sellers Racing	15	Pontiac				S99; 16	IRW; 29	EVG; 15	S99; 12	PPR; 17		DCS; 17	CTS; 17					13th	1278	
2006	Sellers Racing	75	Pontiac	PHO; 19	PHO; 17	S99; 17	IRW; 16	SON; 19		IRW; 20	EVG; 16	S99; 15		CTS; 15					15th	1326	
2006	Sellers Racing	75	Chevy						DCS; 12				CAL; 28						15th	1326	
2006	Sellers Racing	15	Pontiac												AMP; 16				15th	1326	
2007	Sellers Racing	15	Chevy	CTS; 15	PHO; 23	AMP; 19	ELK; DNQ	IOW; DNQ	CNS	SON; 37	DCS	IRW; 26	MMP	EVG	CSR	AMP			27th	487	
2008	Sellers Racing	15	Chevy	AAS; 25	PHO; 21	CTS; 19	IOW	CNS; 18	SON; 24				MMP; 19	IRW; 22		AAS; 20			16th	1113	
2008	Sellers Racing	75	Chevy							IRW; 22	DCS; 10	EVG							16th	1113	
2008	Tanya Jackson	03	Chevy												AMP; 27				16th	1113	
2009	Sellers Racing	15	Chevy	CTS; 13	AAS; 13	PHO; 24	MAD; 12	IOW	DCS; 16	SON; 22	IRW	PIR	MMP; 18	CNS; 12		AAS; 18			12th	1114	
2009	Sellers Racing	5	Chevy												IOW; 24				12th	1114	
2010	Sellers Racing	15	Chevy	AAS; 17	PHO; 20	IOW; 19	DCS; 18	SON; 18	IRW; 19	PIR; 21	MRP; 19		MMP; 27	AAS; 16	PHO				14th	1154	
2010	Sellers Racing	5	Chevy									CNS; 19							14th	1154	
2011	Art Krebs	55	Chevy	PHO; 26															13th	1297	
2011	Sellers Racing	15	Chevy		AAS; 19	MMP; 15		LVS; 18	SON; 30	IRW; 26	EVG; 18	PIR; 19	CNS; 17	MRP; 18	SPO; 20	AAS; 24	PHO		13th	1297	
2011	Sellers Racing	1	Chevy				IOW; DNQ												13th	1297	
2012	Sellers Racing	15	Chevy	PHO; 29	LHC; 20	MMP; 24		IOW; DNQ	BIR; 16	LVS; 13	SON; 27	EVG; 18	CNS; 23	IOW	PIR; 29	SMP	AAS	PHO	17th	245	
2012	Sellers Racing	5	Chevy				S99; 21												17th	245	
2013	Sellers Racing	5	Chevy	PHO; 15	S99; DNQ														13th	328	
2013	Sellers Racing	15	Chevy			BIR; 19	IOW; 13	L44; 13	SON; 26	CNS; 19	IOW; 8	EVG; 7	SPO; 16	MMP; 15	SMP	AAS; 19	KCR	PHO	13th	328	
2014	Sellers Racing	15	Chevy	PHO; 26	IRW; 22	S99; 16		KCR; 19	SON; 26	SLS; 15				KCR; 13	MMP; 19	AAS; 21	PHO; 31		9th	363	
2014	Sellers Racing	5	Chevy				IOW; 10												9th	363	
2014	Sellers Racing	11	Chevy								CNS; 11	IOW; 12	EVG; 12						9th	363	
2015	Sellers Racing	5	Chevy	KCR; 15	IRW; 21	TUS	IOW												25th	85	
2015	Sellers Racing	15	Chevy					SHA; 24	SON; 31	SLS	IOW	EVG	CNS	MER	AAS	PHO			25th	85	
2016	Sellers Racing	15	Chevy	IRW; 15	KCR; 21	TUS	OSS	CNS	SON; 20	SLS	IOW	EVG	DCS	MMP	MMP	MER	AAS; 14		23rd	106	

=== ARCA Hooters SuperCar Series ===
(key) (Bold – Pole position awarded by qualifying time. Italics – Pole position earned by points standings or practice time. * – Most laps led.)

ARCA Hooters SuperCar Series results
Year	Team	No.	Make	1	2	3	4	5	6	7	8	9	10	11	12	13	14	15	16	17	18	19	20	21	AHSS	Pts	Ref
1992	Adele Emerson	44W	Chevy	DAY	FIF	TWS	TAL	TOL	KIL	POC	MCH	FRS	KIL	NSH	DEL	POC	HPT	FRS	ISF	TOL	DSF	TWS; 33	SLM	ATL	NA	0	
1993	Sellers Racing	44W	Pontiac	DAY	FIF	TWS; 42	TAL	KIL	CMS	FRS	TOL	POC	MCH	FRS	POC	KIL	ISF	DSF	TOL	SLM	WIN	ATL			NA	0	
