= Bill Sedgwick =

American racing driver (born 1955)

- Born: March 19, 1955 (age 71); Acton, California, U.S.
- Awards: West Coast Stock Car Hall of Fame (2004)

NASCAR Cup Series career
- 10 races run over 5 years
- Best finish: 49th (1991)
- First race: 1989 Autoworks 500 (Phoenix)
- Last race: 1993 Save Mart Supermarkets 300K (Sears Point)
Wins	Top tens	Poles
0	0	0

NASCAR FedEx Freight Truck Series career
- 53 races run over 5 years
- Best finish: 7th (1995)
- First race: 1995 Skoal Bandit Copper World Classic (Phoenix)
- Last race: 1999 Dodge California Truck Stop 300 (Mesa Marin)
Wins	Top tens	Poles
0	21	1

ARCA Menards Series career
- 1 race run over 1 year
- Best finish: N/A (1992)
- First race: 1992 NASCAR/ARCA Texas World Speedway Shootout (Texas World)
Wins	Top tens	Poles
0	0	0

ARCA Menards Series West career
- 109 races run over 16 years
- Best finish: 1st (1991, 1992)
- First race: 1980 Datsun Twin 200 (Ontario)
- Last race: 2001 Jani-King 250 Presented by NAPA (Irwindale)
- First win: 1989 Budweiser 200 (Madera)
- Last win: 1999 Grainger Industrial Supply 200 Presented by TCI (Portland)
Wins	Top tens	Poles
17	65	15
- Statistics up to date as of March 5, 2025.

Bill Sedgwick (born March 19, 1955) is an American former NASCAR driver who was successful particularly prominent in the late 1980s and early 1990s. He is a two time champion of the NASCAR Winston West Series, where he won the championship in 1991 and 1992.

In 2004, Sedgwick was inducted into the West Coast Stock Car Hall of Fame.

== Motorsports career results ==
=== NASCAR ===
(key) (Bold – Pole position awarded by qualifying time. Italics – Pole position earned by points standings or practice time. * – Most laps led.)

==== Winston Cup Series ====
NASCAR Winston Cup Series results
Year	Team	No.	Make	1	2	3	4	5	6	7	8	9	10	11	12	13	14	15	16	17	18	19	20	21	22	23	24	25	26	27	28	29	30	NWCC	Pts	Ref
1989	Spears Motorsports	76	Buick	DAY	CAR	ATL	RCH	DAR	BRI	NWS	MAR	TAL	CLT	DOV	SON; DNQ	POC	MCH	DAY	POC	TAL	GLN	MCH	BRI	DAR	RCH	DOV	MAR	CLT	NWS	CAR	PHO; 36	ATL		99th	55	
1990	Spears Motorsports	76	Chevy	DAY	RCH	CAR	ATL	DAR	BRI	NWS; DNQ	MAR; 24	TAL	CLT	DOV	SON; 36	POC	MCH	DAY	POC	TAL	GLN	MCH	BRI	DAR	RCH	DOV	MAR	NWS	CLT	CAR	PHO; 20	ATL		52nd	249	
1991	Spears Motorsports	76	Chevy	DAY	RCH	CAR	ATL	DAR	BRI	NWS; DNQ	MAR; 19	TAL	CLT	DOV	SON; 15	POC	MCH	DAY	POC	TAL	GLN	MCH	BRI	DAR	RCH	DOV	MAR	NWS	CLT	CAR	PHO; 21	ATL		49th	324	
1992	Spears Motorsports	75	Chevy	DAY	CAR	RCH	ATL	DAR	BRI	NWS	MAR	TAL	CLT	DOV	SON; 19	POC	MCH	DAY	POC	TAL	GLN	MCH	BRI	DAR	RCH	DOV	MAR	NWS	CLT	CAR	PHO; 27	ATL		56th	188	
1993	Spears Motorsports	76	Chevy	DAY	CAR	RCH	ATL	DAR	BRI	NWS	MAR	TAL	SON; 26	CLT	DOV	POC	MCH	DAY	NHA	POC	TAL	GLN	MCH	BRI	DAR	RCH	DOV	MAR	NWS	CLT	CAR	PHO	ATL	72nd	85	

==== Craftsman Truck Series ====
NASCAR Craftsman Truck Series results
Year	Team	No.	Make	1	2	3	4	5	6	7	8	9	10	11	12	13	14	15	16	17	18	19	20	21	22	23	24	25	26	27	NCTC	Pts	Ref
1995	Spears Motorsports	75	Chevy	PHO; 12	TUS; 8	SGS; 3	MMR; 2	POR; 7	EVG; 15	I70; 8	LVL; 11	BRI; 5	MLW; 5	CNS; 4	HPT; 15	IRP; 27	FLM; 5	RCH; 33	MAR; 8	NWS; 25	SON; 6	**MMR**; 9	PHO; 10								7th	2681	
1996	Darrell Waltrip Motorsports	17	Chevy	HOM; 30	PHO; 18	POR; 4	EVG; 10	TUS; 6	CNS; 7	HPT; 10	BRI; 28	NZH; 28	MLW; 2	LVL; 17	I70; 5	IRP; 30	FLM; 11	GLN; 14	NSV; 23	RCH; 21	NHA; 10	MAR; 34	NWS; 17	SON; 20	MMR; 29	PHO; 23	LVS				14th	2599	
1997	Vintage Motorsports	4	Chevy	WDW	TUS	HOM	PHO	POR; 24	EVG; DNQ	I70; 18	NHA	TEX	BRI	NZH	MLW; DNQ		CNS; 24	HPT; 32	IRP; 22	FLM	NSV; DNQ	GLN	RCH		SON; DNQ	MMR; 33					33rd	928	
1997	Vintage Motorsports	41	Chevy													LVL; DNQ											CAL; 27	PHO	LVS		33rd	928	
1997	Vintage Motorsports	40	Chevy																					MAR; DNQ							33rd	928	
1998	Vintage Motorsports	4	Chevy	WDW	HOM	PHO	POR	EVG	I70	GLN	TEX	BRI	MLW	NZH	CAL	PPR	IRP	NHA	FLM	NSV	HPT	LVL	RCH	MEM	GTY	MAR	SON	MMR; 26	PHO; DNQ	LVS	82nd	137	
1999	Vintage Motorsports	4	Chevy	HOM	PHO; 28	EVG	MMR; 21	MAR	MEM	PPR	I70	BRI	TEX	PIR	GLN	MLW	NSV	NZH	MCH	NHA	IRP	GTY	HPT	RCH							63rd	213	
1999	Vintage Motorsports	44	Chevy																						LVS; DNQ	LVL	TEX	CAL			63rd	213	

==== Winston West Series ====
NASCAR Winston West Series results
Year	Team	No.	Make	1	2	3	4	5	6	7	8	9	10	11	12	13	14	15	NWWSC	Pts	Ref
1980	Sedgwick Racing	25	Chevy	RSD	ONT; 19	S99	RSD	LAG	EVG	POR	SON	MMR	ONT	PHO					N/A	32	
1981	Sedgwick Racing	25	Chevy	RSD	S99	AAS	MMR; 10	RSD	LAG	POR	WSP	EVG	SHA	RSD; 20	SON	RSD	PHO		40th	40	
1982	Sedgwick Racing	35	Chevy	MMR; 5	S99	AAS	RSD	POR	WSP	SHA	EVG	SON	CDR	RSD	RSD	PHO			35th	46	
1985	Sedgwick Racing	25	Buick	SON	SHA	RSD	MMR; 16	SIR	POR	STA	YAK	EVG	WSR; 19	MMR; 19	RSD				29th	99	
1986	Sedgwick Racing	25	Buick	SON	RSD	EVG	RCS	TAC	PIR	WSR; 20	RSD								46th	31	
1988	Spears Motorsports	75	Chevy	SON	MMR; 19	RSD	SGP	POR; 4	EVG; 30	MMR; 24	PHO								24th	127	
1989	Spears Motorsports	75	Chevy	**MAD**; 1*	**MMR**; 3	RAS; 1		POR; 4	**TCR**; 5	EVG; 18	MMR; 2	SGS; 1*							2nd	1789	
1989	Spears Motorsports	75	Buick				SON; DNQ						**SON**; 2						2nd	1789	
1989	Spears Motorsports	76	Buick											PHO; 36					2nd	1789	
1990	Spears Motorsports	75	Chevy	**MMR**; 1*		**SGS**; 1*	POR; 3*	EVG; 1	RAS; 1*	**TCR**; 16	**MMR**; 22								2nd	1341	
1990	Spears Motorsports	76	Chevy		SON; 36							PHO; 20							2nd	1341	
1991	Spears Motorsports	75	Chevy	EVG; 2	MMR; 13		**SGS**; 2	POR; 3	EVG; 3	SSS; 2	**MMR**; 1*								1st	1509	
1991	Spears Motorsports	76	Chevy			SON; 15						PHO; 21							1st	1509	
1992	Spears Motorsports	75	Chevy	MMR; 2	SGS; 7	SON; 19	SHA; 1	POR; 1	EVG; 1	SSS; 12	CAJ; 2	TWS; 43	MMR; 1*	PHO; 27					1st	1817	
1993	Spears Motorsports	75	Chevy	TWS	MMR; 1*	SGS; 3		TUS; 15	SHA; 2	EVG; 4	**POR**; 3	CBS; 4	**SSS**; 2	CAJ; 2*	TCR; 3	MMR; 1*	PHO		3rd	2008	
1993	Spears Motorsports	76	Chevy				SON; 26												3rd	2008	
1995	Spears Motorsports	75	Chevy	TUS; 1	**MMR**; 1*	SON	CNS	MMR	POR	SGS	TUS	AMP	MAD	POR	LVS	SON	MMR; 2*	PHO	25th	545	
1997	Blachley Racing	9	Chevy	TUS; 17	AMP; 18	SON	TUS	MMR; 5	LVS	CAL	EVG	POR	PPR	AMP	SON	MMR; 6	LVS; 14		18th	657	
1999	Vintage Motorsports	44	Chevy	TUS; 3*	LVS; DNQ	PHO; 29	CAL; 24	PPR; 20	MMR; 4	IRW; 2	EVG; 4	POR; 1	IRW; 6	RMR; 7	LVS; 12	**MMR**; 2*	MOT		12th	1789	
2000	Vintage Motorsports	44	Chevy	PHO; 6	**MMR**; 21	LVS; 26	CAL; 15	LAG; 5	IRW; 6	POR; 4	EVG; 6	IRW; 2	RMR; 2	MMR; 8					6th	1659	
2000	Vintage Motorsports	8	Chevy												IRW; 23				6th	1659	
2001	Vintage Motorsports	44	Chevy	PHO; 8															10th	1806	
2001	Vintage Motorsports	24	Chevy		LVS; 14	TUS; 13	MMR; 24	CAL; 20	IRW; 5	LAG; 13	KAN; 11	EVG; 5	CNS; 10*	IRW; 15	RMR; 5	LVS; 18	IRW; 11		10th	1806	

=== ARCA SuperCar Series ===
(key) (Bold – Pole position awarded by qualifying time. Italics – Pole position earned by points standings or practice time. * – Most laps led.)

ARCA SuperCar Series results
Year	Team	No.	Make	1	2	3	4	5	6	7	8	9	10	11	12	13	14	15	16	17	18	19	20	21	ASCC	Pts	Ref
1992	Spears Motorsports	75	Chevy	DAY	FIF	TWS	TAL	TOL	KIL	POC	MCH	FRS	KIL	NSH	DEL	POC	HPT	FRS	ISF	TOL	DSF	TWS; 43	SLM	ATL	NA	0	

Achievements
Preceded by Bill Schmitt	NASCAR Winston West Series champion 1991–1992	Succeeded by Rick Carelli
