= Mark Reed (racing driver) =

American racing driver (born 1969)

- Born: Mark William Reed; February 19, 1969 (age 57); Bakersfield, California, U.S.

NASCAR Cup Series career
- 2 races run over 2 years
- Best finish: 82nd (1991)
- First race: 1990 Checker 500 (Phoenix)
- Last race: 1991 Pyroil 500 (Phoenix)
Wins	Top tens	Poles
0	0	0

ARCA Menards Series West career
- 38 races run over 6 years
- Best finish: 2nd (2001)
- First race: 1990 Spears Manufacturing 400 (Mesa Marin)
- Last race: 2003 Lucas Oil 150 (Mesa Marin)
- First win: 2001 NAPA 300 (Las Vegas Bullring)
- Last win: 2003 Coors Light 200 Presented by NAPA (Evergreen)
Wins	Top tens	Poles
3	26	4
- Statistics up to date as of August 18, 2025.

Mark William Reed (born February 19, 1969) is an American professional stock car racing driver. He has raced in the NASCAR Winston Cup Series and the NASCAR Winston West Series, where he finished second in the points in 2001 in the latter series. He is the father of fellow driver Ryan Reed.

== Motorsports career results ==
=== NASCAR ===
(key) (Bold – Pole position awarded by qualifying time. Italics – Pole position earned by points standings or practice time. * – Most laps led.)

==== Winston Cup Series ====
NASCAR Winston Cup Series results
Year	Team	No.	Make	1	2	3	4	5	6	7	8	9	10	11	12	13	14	15	16	17	18	19	20	21	22	23	24	25	26	27	28	29	NWCC	Pts	Ref
1990	James Reed	72	Chevy	DAY	RCH	CAR	ATL	DAR	BRI	NWS	MAR	TAL	CLT	DOV	SON	POC	MCH	DAY	POC	TAL	GLN	MCH	BRI	DAR	RCH	DOV	MAR	NWS	CLT	CAR	PHO; 34	ATL	94th	61	
1991	James Reed	72	Chevy	DAY	RCH	CAR	ATL	DAR	BRI	NWS	MAR	TAL	CLT	DOV	SON	POC	MCH	DAY	POC	TAL	GLN	MCH	BRI	DAR	RCH	DOV	MAR	NWS	CLT	CAR	PHO; 34	ATL	82nd	61	
