= Brad Tidrick =

American racing driver (born 1955)

- Born: May 17, 1955 (age 71); Yakima, Washington, U.S.

NASCAR Cup Series career
- Best finish: 148th (1986)

ARCA Menards Series West career
- 30 races run over 7 years
- Best finish: 10th (1986)
- First race: 1985 Stroh's Beer 200 (Kent)
- Last race: 1991 Uhlmann Motors 200 (Olympia)
Wins	Top tens	Poles
0	14	0
- Statistics up to date as of November 12, 2026.

Brad Tidrick (born May 17, 1955) is an American former professional stock car racing driver. He competed in the NASCAR Winston West Series from 1985 to 1991.

== Racing career ==
Tidrick competed in Yakima Speedway's Apple Cup in 1985, 1987, and 1988, finishing third in 1985 and winning in the other two years. He is one of eleven multi-time Apple Cup winners.

Tidrick began competing in the NASCAR Winston West Series in 1985, where he ran four races, scoring two fourth-place finishes at Northwest Speedway and Yakima.

Tidrick attempted seven of eight races in 1986, scoring two top-tens in six starts and failing to qualify for the combination race at Riverside International Raceway, his lone NASCAR Winston Cup Series attempt. He finished a career-best tenth in the Winston West standings.

Tidrick made five Winston West starts in 1987, scoring two top-tens with a best finish of eighth at Mesa Marin Raceway.

In 1988, Tidrick ran three Winston West races, finishing sixth at the Spokane Grand Prix Course and Portland Speedway.

Tidrick made four starts in 1989, scoring two top-tens with a best finish of fifth in the Motorcraft 500 at Evergreen Speedway, the longest race of the season.

Tidrick ran three races in 1990, scoring two top-tens with a best finish of seventh in the Miller Genuine Draft 200 at Tri-City Raceway.

Tidrick's final NASCAR starts came in 1991, where he ran four Winston West races, scoring two top-tens with a best finish of eighth at Evergreen.

In 1993, Tidrick attempted a NASCAR Winston Northwest Tour race at Yakima, failing to qualify.

Tidrick ran a ARCA West Circle K Late Model Challenge Series race at the Wenatchee Valley Super Oval in 2007, finishing seventh.

In 2008, Tidrick competed in an ASA Northwest Tour race at Pacific Raceways.

Tidrick made two West Coast Late Model Series starts at Yakima in 2016, finishing nineteenth and twelfth.

Tidrick competed full-time in the West Coast Late Model Series in 2017, scoring nine top-tens in ten races with a best finish of second in the second Yakima race.

Tidrick again competed full-time in the West Coast Late Model Series in 2018, scoring seven top-tens in eight races with a best finish of third in the first Yakima race. He finished third in the standings.

In 2021, Tidrick ran all four races in the Tri-State Challenge Series Hobby Stocks division. He competed part-time in the division in 2022, 2024, and 2025, running two races in 2022 and one in 2024 and 2025.

== Personal life ==
Tidrick's son B. J. is also a racing driver who has won in series such as the NASCAR AutoZone Elite Division, Northwest Series, ARCA West Late Model Challenge Series, and Dodge Weekly Series; he has also served as a crew chief and spotter for drivers such as Danica Dart. He owns Tidrick Quality Transmissions in Yakima, Washington; in 2012, the building was affected by a fire which had been set by burglars.
