= 1990 Checker 500 =

28th race of the 1990 NASCAR Winston Cup Series

Race details
- Race 28 of 29 in the 1990 NASCAR Winston Cup Series
- The 1990 Checker 500 program cover, featuring Dale Earnhardt.
- Date: November 4, 1990
- Official name: 3rd Annual Checker 500
- Location: Avondale, Arizona, Phoenix International Raceway
- Course: Permanent racing facility
- Course length: 1 miles (1.6 km)
- Distance: 312 laps, 312 mi (502.115 km)
- Scheduled distance: 312 laps, 312 mi (502.115 km)
- Average speed: 96.786 miles per hour (155.762 km/h)
- Attendance: 75,000

Pole position
Driver	Rusty Wallace	Blue Max Racing
- Time: 28.929

Most laps led
Driver	Dale Earnhardt	Richard Childress Racing
- Laps: 262

Winner
No. 3	Dale Earnhardt	Richard Childress Racing

Television in the United States
- Network: ESPN
- Announcers: Jerry Punch, Benny Parsons, Ned Jarrett

Radio in the United States
- Radio: Motor Racing Network

The 1990 Checker 500 was the 28th and penultimate stock car race of the 1990 NASCAR Winston Cup Series season, the ninth and final race of the 1990 NASCAR Winston West Series season, and the third iteration of the event. The race was held on Sunday, November 4, 1990, before an audience of 75,000 in Avondale, Arizona at Phoenix International Raceway, a 1-mile (1.6 km) permanent low-banked tri-oval race track. The race took the scheduled 312 laps to complete. At race's end, Richard Childress Racing driver Dale Earnhardt would manage to dominate the majority of the race, leading 262 laps of the race en route to his 48th career NASCAR Winston Cup Series victory and his ninth and final victory of the season.

With the victory and a poor finish from championship contender in the driver's championship, Mark Martin, Earnhardt would manage to take the driver's championship lead, leading Martin by six points heading into the final race of the season, the 1990 Atlanta Journal 500.

== Background ==
The layout of Phoenix International Raceway, the venue where the race was held.

Phoenix International Raceway – also known as PIR – is a one-mile, low-banked tri-oval race track located in Avondale, Arizona. It is named after the nearby metropolitan area of Phoenix. The motorsport track opened in 1964 and currently hosts two NASCAR race weekends annually. PIR has also hosted the IndyCar Series, CART, USAC and the Rolex Sports Car Series. The raceway is currently owned and operated by International Speedway Corporation.

The raceway was originally constructed with a 2.5 mi (4.0 km) road course that ran both inside and outside of the main tri-oval. In 1991 the track was reconfigured with the current 1.51 mi (2.43 km) interior layout. PIR has an estimated grandstand seating capacity of around 67,000. Lights were installed around the track in 2004 following the addition of a second annual NASCAR race weekend.

=== Entry list ===
- (R) denotes rookie driver.

#	Driver	Team	Make	Sponsor
1	Terry Labonte	Precision Products Racing	Oldsmobile	Skoal
2	Ted Musgrave	U.S. Racing	Chevrolet	Wide World of Maps
3	Dale Earnhardt	Richard Childress Racing	Chevrolet	GM Goodwrench Service Plus
4	Ernie Irvan	Morgan–McClure Motorsports	Oldsmobile	Kodak
04	Hershel McGriff	Lipseia Racing	Pontiac	U.S. Bank
5	Ricky Rudd	Hendrick Motorsports	Chevrolet	Levi Garrett
6	Mark Martin	Roush Racing	Ford	Folgers
7	Alan Kulwicki	AK Racing	Ford	Zerex
8	Bobby Hillin Jr.	Stavola Brothers Racing	Buick	Snickers
9	Bill Elliott	Melling Racing	Ford	Coors Light
10	Derrike Cope	Whitcomb Racing	Chevrolet	Purolator Filters
11	Geoff Bodine	Junior Johnson & Associates	Ford	Budweiser
12	Hut Stricklin	Bobby Allison Motorsports	Buick	Raybestos
15	Morgan Shepherd	Bud Moore Engineering	Ford	Motorcraft
17	Darrell Waltrip	Hendrick Motorsports	Chevrolet	Tide
18	Greg Sacks	Hendrick Motorsports	Chevrolet	SlimFast
20	Chad Little	Moroso Racing	Oldsmobile	Crown Central Petroleum
21	Dale Jarrett	Wood Brothers Racing	Ford	Citgo
22	St. James Davis	St. James Racing	Chevrolet	St. James Racing
23	Mike Chase	Freymiller Racing	Buick	Freymiller Trucking
24	Butch Gilliland	Gilliland Racing	Chevrolet	Gear Engineering
25	Ken Schrader	Hendrick Motorsports	Chevrolet	Kodiak
26	Brett Bodine	King Racing	Buick	Quaker State
27	Rusty Wallace	Blue Max Racing	Pontiac	Miller Genuine Draft
28	Davey Allison	Robert Yates Racing	Ford	Texaco, Havoline
29	Gary Collins	Collins Motorsports	Oldsmobile	
30	Michael Waltrip	Bahari Racing	Pontiac	Country Time
33	Harry Gant	Leo Jackson Motorsports	Oldsmobile	Skoal Bandit
34	Ted Kennedy	Emerson Racing	Oldsmobile	Power Burst
42	Kyle Petty	SABCO Racing	Pontiac	Peak Antifreeze
43	Richard Petty	Petty Enterprises	Pontiac	STP
44	Jack Sellers	Emerson Racing	Buick	Coca-Cola
51	Jeff Purvis	Phoenix Racing	Chevrolet	Plasti-Kote
52	Jimmy Means	Jimmy Means Racing	Pontiac	Alka-Seltzer
57	Jim Bown	Osterlund Racing	Pontiac	Heinz
61	Rick Scribner	Scribner Racing	Chevrolet	All-Pro Auto Parts
66	Dick Trickle	Cale Yarborough Motorsports	Pontiac	Phillips 66 TropArtic
69	Brent Kaeding	Smith Racing	Chevrolet	Los Gatos Ferrari
71	Dave Marcis	Marcis Auto Racing	Chevrolet	Big Apple Market
72	Mark Reed	Reed Racing	Chevrolet	AM Plumbing
73	Bill Schmitt	Schmitt Racing	Chevrolet	Bank of California
75	Rick Wilson	RahMoc Enterprises	Pontiac	Dinner Bell Foods
76	Bill Sedgwick	Spears Motorsports	Chevrolet	Spears Manufacturing
89	Rodney Combs	Mueller Brothers Racing	Pontiac	Evinrude Outboard Motors
93	Troy Beebe	Beebe Racing	Buick	Taco Bell
94	Sterling Marlin	Hagan Racing	Oldsmobile	Sunoco
97	Chuck Bown	Tex Racing	Oldsmobile	Kellogg's Frosted Flakes
98	Rick Mast	Travis Carter Enterprises	Chevrolet	Banquet Foods
99	John Krebs	Krebs Racing	Pontiac	Skoal

== Qualifying ==
Qualifying was split into two rounds. The first round was held on Friday, November 2, at 5:30 PM EST. Each driver would have one lap to set a time. During the first round, the top 25 drivers in the round would be guaranteed a starting spot in the race. If a driver was not able to guarantee a spot in the first round, they had the option to scrub their time from the first round and try and run a faster lap time in a second round qualifying run, held on Saturday, November 3, at 2:00 PM EST. As with the first round, each driver would have one lap to set a time. For this specific race, positions 26-40 would be decided on time, and depending on who needed it, a select amount of positions were given to cars who had not otherwise qualified but were high enough in owner's points; which was up to two for cars in the NASCAR Winston Cup Series and up to two extra provisionals for the cars in the NASCAR Winston West Series.

Rusty Wallace, driving for Blue Max Racing, would win the pole, setting a time of 28.929 and an average speed of 124.443 miles per hour (200.272 km/h) in the first round.

Six drivers would fail to qualify.

=== Full qualifying results ===
Pos.	#	Driver	Team	Make	Time	Speed
1	27	Rusty Wallace	Blue Max Racing	Pontiac	28.929	124.443
2	25	Ken Schrader	Hendrick Motorsports	Chevrolet	28.958	124.318
3	3	Dale Earnhardt	Richard Childress Racing	Chevrolet	28.990	124.181
4	28	Davey Allison	Robert Yates Racing	Ford	29.035	123.988
5	66	Dick Trickle	Cale Yarborough Motorsports	Pontiac	29.088	123.762
6	18	Greg Sacks	Hendrick Motorsports	Chevrolet	29.169	123.419
7	98	Rick Mast	Travis Carter Enterprises	Chevrolet	29.188	123.338
8	6	Mark Martin	Roush Racing	Ford	29.190	123.330
9	5	Ricky Rudd	Hendrick Motorsports	Chevrolet	29.197	123.300
10	17	Darrell Waltrip	Hendrick Motorsports	Chevrolet	29.234	123.144
11	7	Alan Kulwicki	AK Racing	Ford	29.243	123.106
12	9	Bill Elliott	Melling Racing	Ford	29.258	123.043
13	11	Geoff Bodine	Junior Johnson & Associates	Ford	29.297	122.879
14	8	Bobby Hillin Jr.	Stavola Brothers Racing	Buick	29.356	122.633
15	94	Sterling Marlin	Hagan Racing	Oldsmobile	29.408	122.416
16	26	Brett Bodine	King Racing	Buick	29.412	122.399
17	4	Ernie Irvan	Morgan–McClure Motorsports	Chevrolet	29.424	122.349
18	12	Hut Stricklin	Bobby Allison Motorsports	Buick	29.466	122.175
19	71	Dave Marcis	Marcis Auto Racing	Chevrolet	29.477	122.129
20	10	Derrike Cope	Whitcomb Racing	Chevrolet	29.497	122.046
Failed to lock in Round 1
21	21	Dale Jarrett	Wood Brothers Racing	Ford	29.416	122.382
22	20	Chad Little	Moroso Racing	Oldsmobile	29.504	122.017
23	1	Terry Labonte	Precision Products Racing	Oldsmobile	29.508	122.001
24	75	Rick Wilson	RahMoc Enterprises	Oldsmobile	29.513	121.980
25	2	Ted Musgrave	U.S. Racing	Pontiac	29.520	121.951
26	33	Harry Gant	Leo Jackson Motorsports	Oldsmobile	29.533	121.898
27	42	Kyle Petty	SABCO Racing	Pontiac	29.574	121.729
28	97	Chuck Bown	Tex Racing	Oldsmobile	29.588	121.671
29	30	Michael Waltrip	Bahari Racing	Pontiac	29.592	121.655
30	15	Morgan Shepherd	Bud Moore Engineering	Ford	29.618	121.548
31	89	Rodney Combs	Mueller Brothers Racing	Pontiac	29.618	121.548
32	76	Bill Sedgwick	Spears Motorsports	Chevrolet	29.631	121.494
33	72	Mark Reed	Reed Racing	Chevrolet	29.749	121.012
34	51	Jeff Purvis	Phoenix Racing	Chevrolet	29.760	120.968
35	23	Mike Chase	Freymiller Racing	Buick	29.799	120.809
36	43	Richard Petty	Petty Enterprises	Pontiac	29.834	120.668
37	93	Troy Beebe	Beebe Racing	Buick	29.884	120.466
38	69	Brent Kaeding	Smith Racing	Chevrolet	29.968	120.128
39	29	Gary Collins	Collins Motorsports	Oldsmobile	30.029	119.884
40	73	Bill Schmitt	Schmitt Racing	Chevrolet	30.046	119.816
Winston Cup provisionals
41	57	Jim Bown	Osterlund Racing	Pontiac	-*	-*
42	52	Jimmy Means	Jimmy Means Racing	Pontiac	-*	-*
Winston West provisional
43	99	John Krebs	Krebs Racing	Pontiac	-*	-*
Failed to qualify
44	04	Hershel McGriff	Lipseia Racing	Pontiac	-*	-*
45	34	Ted Kennedy	Emerson Racing	Oldsmobile	-*	-*
46	24	Butch Gilliland	Gilliland Racing	Chevrolet	-*	-*
47	61	Rick Scribner	Scribner Racing	Chevrolet	-*	-*
48	44	Jack Sellers	Emerson Racing	Buick	-*	-*
49	22	St. James Davis	St. James Racing	Chevrolet	-*	-*
Official first round qualifying results
Official starting lineup

== Race results ==
Fin	St	#	Driver	Team	Make	Laps	Led	Status	Pts	Winnings
1	3	3	Dale Earnhardt	Richard Childress Racing	Chevrolet	312	262	running	185	$72,100
2	2	25	Ken Schrader	Hendrick Motorsports	Chevrolet	312	0	running	170	$32,900
3	30	15	Morgan Shepherd	Bud Moore Engineering	Ford	312	0	running	165	$23,357
4	10	17	Darrell Waltrip	Hendrick Motorsports	Chevrolet	312	0	running	160	$21,500
5	12	9	Bill Elliott	Melling Racing	Ford	312	0	running	155	$19,775
6	11	7	Alan Kulwicki	AK Racing	Ford	312	0	running	150	$12,225
7	7	98	Rick Mast	Travis Carter Enterprises	Chevrolet	312	0	running	146	$10,250
8	13	11	Geoff Bodine	Junior Johnson & Associates	Ford	312	0	running	142	$14,950
9	17	4	Ernie Irvan	Morgan–McClure Motorsports	Chevrolet	312	0	running	138	$10,150
10	8	6	Mark Martin	Roush Racing	Ford	312	0	running	134	$14,875
11	4	28	Davey Allison	Robert Yates Racing	Ford	312	0	running	130	$13,350
12	6	18	Greg Sacks	Hendrick Motorsports	Chevrolet	312	0	running	127	$4,850
13	23	1	Terry Labonte	Precision Products Racing	Oldsmobile	312	0	running	124	$8,650
14	20	10	Derrike Cope	Whitcomb Racing	Chevrolet	311	0	running	121	$9,450
15	16	26	Brett Bodine	King Racing	Buick	311	0	running	118	$8,625
16	15	94	Sterling Marlin	Hagan Racing	Oldsmobile	310	0	running	115	$7,525
17	19	71	Dave Marcis	Marcis Auto Racing	Chevrolet	310	0	running	112	$7,200
18	40	73	Bill Schmitt	Schmitt Racing	Chevrolet	310	0	running	109	$4,875
19	24	75	Rick Wilson	RahMoc Enterprises	Oldsmobile	310	0	running	106	$6,650
20	32	76	Bill Sedgwick	Spears Motorsports	Chevrolet	310	0	running	103	$5,300
21	22	20	Chad Little	Moroso Racing	Oldsmobile	309	0	running	100	$4,450
22	25	2	Ted Musgrave	U.S. Racing	Pontiac	309	0	running	97	$5,375
23	36	43	Richard Petty	Petty Enterprises	Pontiac	308	0	running	94	$4,300
24	28	97	Chuck Bown	Tex Racing	Oldsmobile	307	0	running	91	$3,300
25	42	52	Jimmy Means	Jimmy Means Racing	Pontiac	307	0	running	88	$4,275
26	18	12	Hut Stricklin	Bobby Allison Motorsports	Buick	306	0	running	85	$4,175
27	31	89	Rodney Combs	Mueller Brothers Racing	Pontiac	305	0	running	82	$3,300
28	41	57	Jim Bown	Osterlund Racing	Pontiac	304	0	running	79	$3,950
29	38	69	Brent Kaeding	Smith Racing	Chevrolet	304	0	running	76	$3,230
30	21	21	Dale Jarrett	Wood Brothers Racing	Ford	299	0	accident	73	$6,395
31	43	99	John Krebs	Krebs Racing	Pontiac	293	0	running	70	$3,835
32	9	5	Ricky Rudd	Hendrick Motorsports	Chevrolet	293	0	running	67	$5,780
33	39	29	Gary Collins	Collins Motorsports	Oldsmobile	280	0	running	64	$3,125
34	33	72	Mark Reed	Reed Racing	Chevrolet	269	0	ignition	61	$3,100
35	37	93	Troy Beebe	Beebe Racing	Buick	263	0	accident	58	$3,085
36	34	51	Jeff Purvis	Phoenix Racing	Chevrolet	256	0	brakes	55	$3,055
37	26	33	Harry Gant	Leo Jackson Motorsports	Oldsmobile	152	0	tires	52	$10,045
38	1	27	Rusty Wallace	Blue Max Racing	Pontiac	77	50	engine	54	$15,975
39	35	23	Mike Chase	Freymiller Racing	Buick	70	0	accident	46	$3,000
40	5	66	Dick Trickle	Cale Yarborough Motorsports	Pontiac	68	0	engine	43	$6,575
41	27	42	Kyle Petty	SABCO Racing	Pontiac	48	0	accident	40	$9,975
42	14	8	Bobby Hillin Jr.	Stavola Brothers Racing	Buick	47	0	accident	37	$4,975
43	29	30	Michael Waltrip	Bahari Racing	Pontiac	47	0	accident	34	$4,975
Failed to qualify
44		04	Hershel McGriff	Lipseia Racing	Pontiac					
45		34	Ted Kennedy	Emerson Racing	Oldsmobile					
46		24	Butch Gilliland	Gilliland Racing	Chevrolet					
47		61	Rick Scribner	Scribner Racing	Chevrolet					
48		44	Jack Sellers	Emerson Racing	Buick					
49		22	St. James Davis	St. James Racing	Chevrolet					
Official race results

== Standings after the race ==
Drivers' Championship standings

	Pos	Driver	Points
1	1	Dale Earnhardt	4,260
1	2	Mark Martin	4,254 (-6)
	3	Bill Elliott	3,871 (-389)
	4	Geoff Bodine	3,842 (–418)
	5	Rusty Wallace	3,533 (–727)
2	6	Morgan Shepherd	3,509 (–751)
	7	Ricky Rudd	3,486 (–774)
2	8	Kyle Petty	3,461 (–799)
1	9	Alan Kulwicki	3,452 (–808)
1	10	Ernie Irvan	3,447 (–813)
Official driver's standings

- Note: Only the first 10 positions are included for the driver standings.

Previous race: 1990 AC Delco 500	NASCAR Winston Cup Series; 1990 season	Next race: 1990 Atlanta Journal 500

Previous race: 1990 Spears Manufacturing 400	NASCAR Winston West Series; 1990 season	Next race: 1991 Winston 300
