= 1990 Miller Genuine Draft 200 =

7th race of the 1990 NASCAR Winston West Series

Race details
- Race 7 of 9 in the 1990 NASCAR Winston West Series season
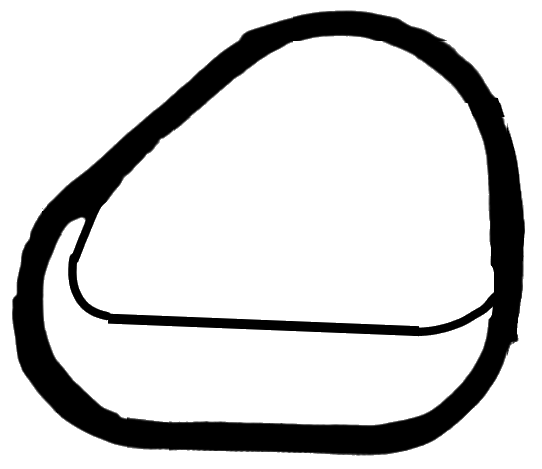
- Date: September 30, 1990
- Location: Tri-City Raceway in West Richland, Washington
- Course: Permanent racing facility
- Course length: 0.500 miles (0.805 km)
- Distance: 200 laps, 100.00 mi (160.93 km)
- Average speed: 56.721 miles per hour (91.284 km/h)

Pole position
Driver	Bill Sedgwick	Spears Motorsports

Most laps led
Driver	Mike Chase	Freymiller Racing
- Laps: 113

Winner
No. 79	Roy Smith	Razore Racing

The 1990 Miller Genuine Draft 200 was the seventh stock car race of the 1990 NASCAR Winston West Series season. The race was held on Sunday, September 30, 1990, at Tri-City Raceway, a 0.500 mi (0.805 km) trioval shaped racetrack in West Richland, Washington. The race took the scheduled 200 laps to complete. The race was won by Roy Smith, his second win of the season and the last of his career. Smith took the lead from Mike Chase on lap 148, beating Chase off of pit road after yellow flag stops. Defending series champion Bill Schmitt finished third, and Terry Fisher and Robert Sprague rounded out the top five.

== Report ==
=== Background ===
Tri-City Raceway is a 0.500 mi (0.805 km) asphalt oval race track located in West Richland, Washington. The track was built to represent and is named after the three nearby cities to the racetrack. The track is the only 0.500 mi (0.805 km) mile paved trioval in North America.

==== Entry list ====
#	Driver	Owner	Manufacturer
0	Tim McCauley	Tim McCauley	Chevrolet
07	Larry Gunselman	Larry Gunselman	Pontiac
09	Terry Fisher	Dick Midgley	Pontiac
10	Jim Bown	John Kieper	Chevrolet
14	Mike French	Mike French	Oldsmobile
15	Rick Scribner	Rick Scribner	Chevrolet
19	Robert Sprague	Larry Rouse	Ford
22	St. James Davis	LaDonna Davis	Buick
23	Mike Chase	Don Freymiller	Buick
24	Butch Gilliland	Butch Gilliland	Chevrolet
27	Gary Scott	Cindi Tidrick	Chevrolet
33	Rick Mackey	Rick Mackey	Pontiac
41	Chuck Welch	Sara Vincent	Buick
44	Jack Sellers	Adele Emerson	Buick
68	Larry Gaylord	Larry Gaylord	Oldsmobile
70	L.J. Pryor	Unknown	Ford
72	Brad Tidrick	Cindi Tidrick	Chevrolet
73	Bill Schmitt	Bill Schmitt	Chevrolet
75	Bill Sedgwick	Wayne Spears	Chevrolet
79	Roy Smith	Warren Razore	Ford
88	Bob Walker	Bob Walker	Pontiac
99	John Krebs	John Krebs	Pontiac

== Qualifying ==
Bill Sedgwick won the pole with a speed of 95.541 mph.

== Race results ==
Fin	St	#	Driver	Owner	Make	Laps	Led	Status	Pts
1	3	79	Roy Smith	Warren Razore	Ford	200	53	Running	180
2	2	23	Mike Chase	Don Freymiller	Buick	200	113	Running	180
3	5	73	Bill Schmitt	Bill Schmitt	Chevrolet	200	0	Running	165
4	7	09	Terry Fisher	Dick Midgley	Pontiac	200	0	Running	160
5	12	19	Robert Sprague	Larry Rouse	Ford	200	21	Running	160
6	10	99	John Krebs	John Krebs	Pontiac	200	0	Running	150
7	6	72	Brad Tidrick	Cindi Tidrick	Chevrolet	198	0	Running	146
8	9	44	Jack Sellers	Edele Emerson	Buick	198	8	Running	147
9	4	10	Jim Bown	John Kieper	Chevrolet	197	5	Running	143
10	13	70	L.J. Pryor	Unknown	Ford	196	0	Running	134
11	16	07	Larry Gunselman	Larry Gunselman	Pontiac	193	0	Running	130
12	18	68	Larry Gaylord	Larry Gaylord	Oldsmobile	187	0	Running	127
13	14	15	Rick Scribner	Rick Scribner	Chevrolet	187	0	Running	124
14	17	0	Tim McCauley	Tim McCauley	Chevrolet	185	0	Running	121
15	21	27	Gary Scott	Cindi Tidrick	Chevrolet	179	0	Running	118
16	1	75	Bill Sedgwick	Wayne Spears	Chevrolet	172	0	Engine	115
17	15	22	St. James Davis	LaDonna Davis	Buick	160	0	Running	112
18	19	33	Rick Mackey	Rick Mackey	Pontiac	160	0	Running	109
19	8	24	Butch Gilliland	Butch Gilliland	Chevrolet	146	0	Suspension	106
20	11	88	Bob Walker	Bob Walker	Pontiac	70	0	Accident	103
21	20	41	Chuck Welch	Sara Vincent	Buick	48	0	Oil Leak	100
22	22	14	Mike French	Mike French	Oldsmobile	14	0	Piston	97

== Standings after the race ==
	Pos	Driver	Points
	1	Bill Sedgwick	1171
	2	Bill Schmitt	1087 (–84)
	3	Terry Fisher	1078 (–93)
	4	Mike Chase	1059 (–112)
1	5	John Krebs	976 (–195)
1	6	Butch Gilliland	946 (–225)
1	7	Robert Sprague	884 (–287)
1	8	Jack Sellers	873 (–298)
	9	Hershel McGriff	680 (–491)
1	10	Bob Walker	676 (–495)

- Note: Only the first 10 positions are included for the driver standings.

Previous race: 1990 Six Rivers National Bank 200	NASCAR Winston West Series; 1990 season	Next race: 1990 Spears Manufacturing 400
