= 1990 Winston 200 (Portland, Oregon) =

4th race of the 1990 NASCAR Winston West Series

Race details
- Race 4 of 9 in the 1990 NASCAR Winston West Series season
- Date: July 1, 1990
- Location: Portland Speedway in Portland, Oregon
- Course: Permanent racing facility
- Course length: 0.500 miles (0.805 km)
- Distance: 200 laps, 100.00 mi (160.93 km)
- Average speed: 56.953 miles per hour (91.657 km/h)

Pole position
Driver	Mike Chase	Freymiller Racing

Most laps led
Driver	Bill Sedgwick	Spears Motorsports
- Laps: 83

Winner
No. 79	Roy Smith	Razore Racing

The 1990 Winston 200 was the fourth race of the 1990 NASCAR Winston West Series season. The race was held on Sunday, July 1, 1990, at Portland Speedway, a 0.500 mi (0.805 km) oval shaped racetrack in Portland, Oregon. The race took the scheduled 200 laps to complete. The race was won by Roy Smith, his first win of the season. Smith was not in contention for the win until after his second and final pit stop, where he moved into second before passing Bill Sedgwick for the lead with 23 laps remaining. Bill Schmitt passed Sedgwick finished second, relegating Sedgwick to a third place finish. 1990 Daytona 500 winner Derrike Cope finished fourth in what would be his final West Series start, and Butch Gilliland rounded out the top five.

== Report ==
=== Background ===
Portland Speedway was a half-mile race track for auto racing in Portland, Oregon. It was in existence from 1924 until 2001. It hosted 55 races for the West Series between 1956 and 2000.

==== Entry list ====
#	Driver	Owner	Manufacturer
04	Hershel McGriff	Bob Lipseia	Pontiac
07	Mark Walbridge	Unknown	Pontiac
7	Ron Eaton	Ron Eaton	Pontiac
08	Dick Gaboury	Jack Sellers	Chevrolet
8	Chuck Welch	Adele Emerson	Chevrolet
09	Terry Fisher	Dick Midgley	Chevrolet
9	J.C. Danielsen	Larry Rouse	Ford
10	Derrike Cope	Bob Whitcomb	Chevrolet
19	Robert Sprague	Larry Rouse	Ford
22	St. James Davis	LaDonna Davis	Buick
23	Mike Chase	Don Freymiller	Buick
24	Butch Gilliland	Butch Gilliland	Chevrolet
27	Gary Scott	Cindi Tidrick	Chevrolet
28	Gary Collins	Marion Collins	Oldsmobile
33	Rick Mackey	Rick Mackey	Pontiac
44	Jack Sellers	Adele Emerson	Buick
68	Larry Gaylord	Larry Gaylord	Oldsmobile
72	Brad Tidrick	Cindi Tidrick	Chevrolet
73	Bill Schmitt	Bill Schmitt	Chevrolet
75	Bill Sedgwick	Wayne Spears	Chevrolet
77	Mike Hickingbottom	Mike Hickingbottom	Pontiac
79	Roy Smith	Warren Razore	Ford
88	Bob Walker	Bob Walker	Pontiac
99	John Krebs	John Krebs	Pontiac

== Qualifying ==
Mike Chase won the pole with a speed of 86.963 mph.

== Race results ==
Fin	St	#	Driver	Owner	Make	Laps	Led	Status	Pts
1	9	79	Roy Smith	Warren Razore	Ford	200	23	Running	180
2	8	73	Bill Schmitt	Bill Schmitt	Chevrolet	200	51	Running	175
3	3	75	Bill Sedgwick	Wayne Spears	Chevrolet	200	83	Running	175
4	4	10	Derrike Cope	Bob Whitcomb	Chevrolet	200	0	Running	160
5	13	24	Butch Gilliland	Butch Gilliland	Chevrolet	200	1	Running	160
6	2	04	Hershel McGriff	Bob Lipseia	Pontiac	200	19	Running	155
7	1	23	Mike Chase	Don Freymiller	Buick	200	23	Running	151
8	11	19	Robert Sprague	Larry Rouse	Ford	196	0	Running	142
9	16	33	Rick Mackey	Rick Mackey	Pontiac	194	0	Running	138
10	14	88	Bob Walker	Bob Walker	Pontiac	193	0	Running	134
11	5	09	Terry Fisher	Dick Midgley	Chevrolet	192	0	Running	130
12	23	07	Mark Walbridge	Unknown	Pontiac	166	0	Running	127
13	12	99	John Krebs	John Krebs	Pontiac	166	0	Running	124
14	10	9	J.C. Danielsen	Larry Rouse	Ford	152	0	Accident	121
15	7	28	Gary Collins	Marion Collins	Oldsmobile	152	0	Accident	118
16	6	7	Ron Eaton	Ron Eaton	Pontiac	151	0	Accident	115
17	15	44	Jack Sellers	Adele Emerson	Buick	149	0	Electrical	112
18	17	72	Brad Tidrick	Cindi Tidrick	Chevrolet	142	0	Running	109
19	18	7	Mike Hickingbottom	Mike Hickingbottom	Pontiac	123	0	Accident	106
20	21	27	Gary Scott	Cindi Tidrick	Chevrolet	89	0	Accident	103
21	19	22	St. James Davis	LaDonna Davis	Buick	76	0	Oil Leak	100
22	22	08	Dick Gaboury	Jack Sellers	Chevrolet	36	0	Handling	97
23	20	68	Larry Gaylord	Larry Gaylord	Oldsmobile	22	0	Steering	94
24	24	8	Chuck Welch	Adele Emerson	Chevrolet	16	0	Ignition	91

== Standings after the race ==
	Pos	Driver	Points
	1	Bill Sedgwick	691
2	2	Bill Schmitt	620 (-71)
1	3	Terry Fisher	617 (-74)
1	4	Hershel McGriff	586 (-105)
1	5	Butch Gilliland	583 (-108)
3	6	John Krebs	572 (-119)
	7	Mike Chase	569 (-122)
	8	Jack Sellers	460 (-231)
	9	Robert Sprague	457 (-234)
	10	Gary Collins	431 (-260)

- Note: Only the first 10 positions are included for the driver standings.

Previous race: 1990 Winston 200	NASCAR Winston West Series; 1990 season	Next race: 1990 Motorcraft 500
