= 1990 Winston 200 (Saugus, California) =

3rd race of the 1990 NASCAR Winston West Series

Race details
- Race 3 of 9 in the 1990 NASCAR Winston West Series season
- Date: June 16, 1990
- Location: Saugus Speedway in Saugus, California
- Course: Permanent racing facility
- Course length: 0.333 miles (0.536 km)
- Distance: 200 laps, 66.60 mi (107.18 km)
- Average speed: 55.788 miles per hour (89.782 km/h)

Pole position
Driver	Bill Sedgwick	Spears Motorsports

Most laps led
Driver	Bill Sedgwick	Spears Motorsports
- Laps: 200

Winner
No. 75	Bill Sedgwick	Spears Motorsports

The 1990 Winston 200 was the third race of the 1990 NASCAR Winston West Series season. The race was held on Saturday, June 16, 1990, at Saugus Speedway, a 0.333 mi (0.536 km) oval shaped racetrack in Saugus, Santa Clarita, California. The race took the scheduled 200 laps to complete. The race was won by Bill Sedgwick, his second win of the season. After starting on the pole, Sedgwick led all 200 laps. Sedgwick, who set a track record in qualifying, beat defending series champion Bill Schmitt by two seconds to win the race. John Krebs finished third, the only other car on the lead lap, with Robert Sprague and Hershel McGriff rounding out the top five.

== Report ==
=== Background ===
Saugus Speedway was a 1/3 mile racetrack in Saugus, Santa Clarita, California on a 35-acre (140,000 m^{2}) site. The stadium was closed on July 19, 1995 and no longer holds races.

==== Entry list ====
#	Driver	Owner	Manufacturer
04	Hershel McGriff	Bob Lipseia	Pontiac
07	Mark Walbridge	Unknown	Pontiac
8	Ron Hornaday Jr.	Jack Sellers	Buick
09	Terry Fisher	Dick Midgley	Chevrolet
9	J.C. Danielsen	Larry Rouse	Ford
19	Robert Sprague	Larry Rouse	Ford
22	St. James Davis	LaDonna Davis	Buick
23	Mike Chase	Don Freymiller	Buick
24	Butch Gilliland	Butch Gilliland	Chevrolet
28	Gary Collins	Marion Collins	Oldsmobile
33	Rick Mackey	Rick Mackey	Pontiac
38	Duke Hoenshell	Duke Hoenshell	Pontiac
44	Jack Sellers	Adele Emerson	Buick
73	Bill Schmitt	Bill Schmitt	Chevrolet
75	Bill Sedgwick	Wayne Spears	Chevrolet
77	Mike Hickingbottom	Mike Hickingbottom	Pontiac
88	Bob Walker	Bob Walker	Pontiac
99	John Krebs	John Krebs	Pontiac

== Qualifying ==
With a track record speed of 72.966 mph, Bill Sedgwick won the pole.

== Race results ==
Fin	St	#	Driver	Owner	Make	Laps	Led	Status	Pts
1	1	75	Bill Sedgwick	Wayne Spears	Chevrolet	200	200	Running	185
2	3	73	Bill Schmitt	Bill Schmitt	Chevrolet	200	0	Running	170
3	5	99	John Krebs	John Krebs	Pontiac	200	0	Running	165
4	9	19	Robert Sprague	Larry Rouse	Ford	199	0	Running	160
5	2	04	Hershel McGriff	Bob Lipseia	Pontiac	199	0	Running	155
6	10	23	Mike Chase	Don Freymiller	Buick	199	0	Running	150
7	7	9	J.C. Danielsen	Larry Rouse	Ford	199	0	Running	146
8	15	09	Terry Fisher	Dick Midgley	Chevrolet	198	0	Running	142
9	6	28	Gary Collins	Marion Collins	Oldsmobile	198	0	Running	138
10	8	24	Butch Gilliland	Butch Gilliland	Chevrolet	197	0	Running	134
11	11	07	Mark Walbridge	Unknown	Pontiac	196	0	Running	130
12	12	77	Mike Hickingbottom	Mike Hickingbottom	Pontiac	195	0	Running	127
13	13	38	Duke Hoenshell	Duke Hoenshell	Pontiac	193	0	Running	124
14	14	33	Rick Mackey	Rick Mackey	Pontiac	192	0	Running	121
15	4	88	Bob Walker	Bob Walker	Pontiac	191	0	Running	118
16	18	44	Jack Sellers	Adele Emerson	Buick	179	0	Running	115
17	17	22	St. James Davis	LaDonna Davis	Buick	124	0	Running	112
18	16	8	Ron Hornaday Jr.	Jack Sellers	Buick	82	0	Brakes	109

== Standings after the race ==
	Pos	Driver	Points
1	1	Bill Sedgwick	516
1	2	Terry Fisher	487 (-29)
2	3	John Krebs	448 (-68)
3	4	Bill Schmitt	445 (-71)
1	5	Hershel McGriff	431 (-85)
2	6	Butch Gilliland	423 (-93)
1	7	Mike Chase	418 (-98)
1	8	Jack Sellers	348 (-168)
3	9	Robert Sprague	315 (-201)
	10	Gary Collins	313 (-203)

- Note: Only the first 10 positions are included for the driver standings.

Previous race: 1990 Banquet Frozen Foods 300	NASCAR Winston West Series; 1990 season	Next race: 1990 Winston 200
