= Spears Motorsports =

NASCAR truck racing team

- Owner(s): Wayne Spears, Connie Spears
- Base: Agua Dulce, California
- Series: Craftsman Truck Series, Winston Cup
- Race drivers: Aric Almirola, Bobby Gill, Kevin Harvick, Dennis Setzer, David Starr, Clay Rogers, Bill Sedgwick
- Manufacturer: Chevrolet
- Opened: 1987
- Closed: 2007
- Website: www.spearsmotorsports.com

Career
- Drivers' Championships: 0
- Race victories: 4 (Craftsman Truck)

Spears Motorsports was a NASCAR Craftsman Truck Series team owned by Wayne and Connie Spears of Agua Dulce, California. The team is most notable for its longevity in the Truck Series, running all but two races before their closure, their commitment to running with Chevrolet and for always running their white and blue No. 75.

Wayne Spears is a 2009 inductee of the West Coast Stock Car Hall of Fame.

== Winston Cup ==
Spears Motorsports debuted in 1987 at Riverside with road racer Tommy Kendall driving the No. 76 Spears Manufacturing Buick. However, they would last only 26 laps before being hit with oil troubles. Kendall and Spears returned to Riverside in '88, and improved their results to 18th, leading one lap. Kendall would be released in favor of Bill Sedgwick, debuting at Phoenix but finishing 36th with ignition troubles. Sedgwick and Spears would only make 8 starts between 1989 NASCAR Winston Cup Series and 1992 NASCAR Winston Cup Series due to Sedgwick also running in the Winston West Series. Ron Hornaday would make his Cup debut with Spears in 1993, also at Phoenix finishing 22nd. Sedgwick returned to the team the following year without much success. Taking a leap at the newly formed SuperTruck Series, the Spears' sold off their Cup equipment at season's end.

=== Car No. 76 History ===
NASCAR Winston Cup Series results
| Year | Driver | No. | Make | 1 | 2 | 3 | 4 | 5 | 6 | 7 | 8 | 9 | 10 | 11 | 12 | 13 | 14 | 15 | 16 | 17 | 18 | 19 | 20 | 21 | 22 | 23 | 24 | 25 | 26 | 27 | 28 | 29 | 30 | 31 | NWCC | Pts |
|---|---|---|---|---|---|---|---|---|---|---|---|---|---|---|---|---|---|---|---|---|---|---|---|---|---|---|---|---|---|---|---|---|---|---|---|---|
| 1987 | Roman Calczynski | 76 | Buick | DAY | CAR | RCH | ATL | DAR | NWS | BRI | MAR | TAL | CLT | DOV | POC | RSD; DNQ | MCH | DAY | POC | TAL | GLN | MCH | BRI | DAR | RCH | DOV | MAR | NWS | CLT | CAR | | | | | | |
| 1987 | Tommy Kendall | 76 | Buick | | | | | | | | | | | | | | | | | | | | | | | | | | | | RSD; 38 | ATL | | | | |
| 1988 | Tommy Kendall | 76 | Buick | DAY | RCH | CAR | ATL | DAR | BRI | NWS | MAR | TAL | CLT | DOV | RSD; 18 | POC | MCH | DAY | POC | TAL | GLN | MCH | BRI | DAR | RCH | DOV | MAR | CLT | NWS | CAR | PHO | ATL | | | | |
| 1989 | Bill Sedgwick | 76 | Buick | DAY | CAR | ATL | RCH | DAR | BRI | NWS | MAR | TAL | CLT | DOV | SON; DNQ | POC | MCH | DAY | POC | TAL | GLN | MCH | BRI | DAR | RCH | DOV | MAR | CLT | NWS | CAR | PHO; 36 | ATL | | | | |
| 1990 | Bill Sedgwick | 76 | Chevy | DAY | RCH | CAR | ATL | DAR | BRI | NWS; DNQ | MAR; 24 | TAL | CLT | DOV | SON; 36 | POC | MCH | DAY | POC | TAL | GLN | MCH | BRI | DAR | RCH | DOV | MAR | NWS | CLT | CAR | PHO; 20 | ATL | | | | |
| 1991 | Bill Sedgwick | 76 | Chevy | DAY | RCH | CAR | ATL | DAR | BRI | NWS; DNQ | MAR; 19 | TAL | CLT | DOV | SON; 15 | POC | MCH | DAY | POC | TAL | GLN | MCH | BRI | DAR | RCH | DOV | MAR | NWS | CLT | CAR | PHO; 21 | ATL | | | | |
| 1992 | Bill Sedgwick | 75 | Chevy | DAY | CAR | RCH | ATL | DAR | BRI | NWS | MAR | TAL | CLT | DOV | SON; 19 | POC | MCH | DAY | POC | TAL | GLN | MCH | BRI | DAR | RCH | DOV | MAR | NWS | CLT | CAR | PHO; 27 | ATL | | | | |
| 1993 | Bill Sedgwick | 76 | Chevy | DAY | CAR | RCH | ATL | DAR | BRI | NWS | MAR | TAL | SON; 26 | CLT | DOV | POC | MCH | DAY | NHA | POC | TAL | GLN | | | | | | | | | | | | | | |
| 1993 | Ron Hornaday Jr. | 76 | Chevy | | | | | | | | | | | | | | | | | | | | MCH; DNQ | BRI | DAR | RCH | DOV | MAR | NWS | CLT | CAR | PHO; 22 | ATL | | | |
| 1994 | Ron Hornaday Jr. | 76 | Chevy | DAY | CAR | RCH | ATL | DAR | BRI | NWS | MAR | TAL | SON; 39 | CLT | DOV | POC | MCH | DAY | NHA | POC | TAL | IND; DNQ | GLN | MCH | BRI | DAR | RCH | DOV | MAR | NWS | CLT | CAR | PHO; 34 | ATL | | |

== Craftsman Truck Series ==
=== Early struggles ===
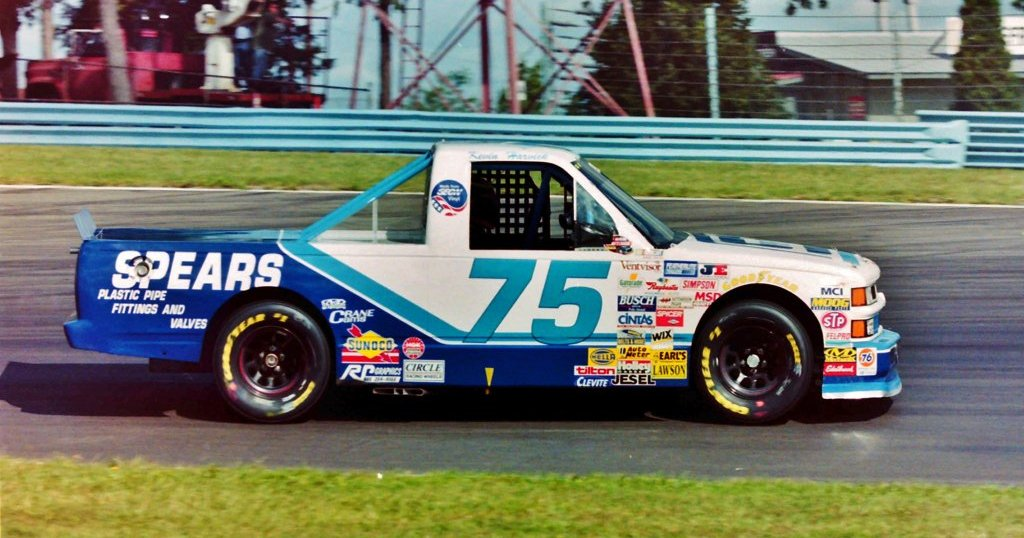
Kevin Harvick Spears Motorsports Chevrolet Watkins Glen International 1997

In 1995, Bill France Jr. announced the official formation of the NASCAR SuperTruck Series by Craftsman. With Hornaday already signed to drive Dale Earnhardt Incorporated's No. 16 truck, the Spears family turned back to Bill Sedgwick, who would debut their white No. 75 Spears Manufacturing Chevrolet at PIR for the Copper World Classic. Sedgwick would finish 12th in the first ever truck race. Spears proved its competitiveness by winning the pole at Mesa Marin Speedway. Spears Motorsports's first season in the trucks netted them 1 pole, 6 top 5s, and 13 top 10s for a seventh-place points finish. Sedgwick left for Darrell Waltrip Motorsports in 1996, and Spears brought on driver Bobby Gill, who was a consistent top 20 finisher but released after Louisville despite gaining four top tens. Gill was replaced by Busch Series driver Nathan Buttke, who had 7 top 10 starts, but only 3 top 10 finishes and 7 DNF's. Buttke was released for Dan Press who also struggled and had 4 DNF's. Press was soon replaced by another West Series driver, Kevin Harvick, who had made two previous starts in the No. 79 Chevrolet at Tucson and Louisville, finishing in the top 20. Harvick would struggle with only an average season of mid pack finishes but garnered two 8th-place finishes. Harvick ran the full 1998 season except for Nashville, where Lonnie Rush Jr. drove the No. 75 truck but crashed. Despite three consecutive DNF's at the beginning of the year, Harvick and team rallied back to finish 17th in points, with 3 top 5s and 5 top 10s. Harvick would leave Spears for Jim Herrick's team in 1999, and was replaced by Rush, who struggled and was replaced by Marty Houston, who gave the team a top 10 at Nazareth. Houston returned in 2000, scoring 1 top 5 and 10 top 10s to finish 12th in points. His success raised the eyebrows of Armando Fitz, who got him into his Busch Series car for 2001. Another future USAR driver, Billy Bigley, took the reins of the No. 75, resulting in 1 top 5 and 8 top 10s for a 13th-place points finish.

=== David Starr era ===
Despite Bigley's points finish, he would be replaced for 2002 by David Starr. Despite making only 5 starts in 2001, Starr had 4 top 5 finishes with John Menard Jr.'s truck team. Given a full-time ride, the combination of Starr and Spears would prove to be one of the most famous in the Truck Series. Starr gave the team its first ever win at Vegas holding off eventual champion Mike Bliss. Their first season with Starr proved to be their best with 8 top 5s and 16 top tens resulting in a 5th-place points finish along with the Most Popular Driver award. In 2003, Starr was tenth in points after finishing 6th at Texas when he was injured, forcing him to miss four races. Starr was replaced by Busch Series driver Hank Parker Jr. who had two top 10s. Starr returned at Gateway, but could not find victory lane again and dropped to 13th in points. In 2004, the team would have its most successful seasons, taking the pole at Charlotte, along with 2 wins, 8 top 5s and 16 top 10s and a 6th-place points finish. 2005 gave the team only four top 5s and ten top 10s and a 7th-place points finish. Starr announced his departure from Spears and move to Red Horse Racing in 2006.

=== Success and demise ===
Joe Gibbs Racing owner Joe Gibbs contracted Spears to field their Cuban American development driver Aric Almirola for Rookie of the Year in 2006. Almirola would become the first ROTY contender to drive the famous No. 75. However, Almirola struggled in his transition and mustered only 3 top 10s. Almirola would move up to the Busch Series part-time. For 2007, Spears would hire "Short Track Slayer" Dennis Setzer, the so-called bridesmade of the Truck Series for finishing 2nd in points three years in a row with the struggling Morgan-Dollar Motorsports. Setzer lived up to his name by winning at Mansfield on a no stop strategy. That would be the last top five for Spears as Setzer did not break into the top 10 after that race and was released prior to Vegas. USAR driver Clay Rogers would step into the No. 75 but would not crack the top 10. At season's end Wayne and Connie Spears posted a letter on their website's homepage announcing that Spears Motorsports would not return for 2008 due to financial difficulties.

==== Truck No. 75 History ====
NASCAR Craftsman Truck Series results
| Year | Driver | No. | Make | 1 | 2 | 3 | 4 | 5 | 6 | 7 | 8 | 9 | 10 | 11 | 12 | 13 | 14 | 15 | 16 | 17 | 18 | 19 | 20 | 21 | 22 | 23 | 24 | 25 | 26 | 27 | NCTC | Pts |
|---|---|---|---|---|---|---|---|---|---|---|---|---|---|---|---|---|---|---|---|---|---|---|---|---|---|---|---|---|---|---|---|---|
| 1995 | Bill Sedgwick | 75 | Chevy | PHO; 12 | TUS; 8 | SGS; 3 | MMR; 2 | POR; 7 | EVG; 15 | I70; 8 | LVL; 11 | BRI; 5 | MLW; 5 | CNS; 4 | HPT; 15 | IRP; 27 | FLM; 5 | RCH; 33 | MAR; 8 | NWS; 25 | SON; 6 | MMR; 9 | PHO; 10 | | | | | | | | | |
| 1996 | Bobby Gill | 75 | Chevy | HOM; 23 | PHO; 9 | POR; 20 | EVG; 26 | TUS; 7 | CNS; 11 | HPT; 15 | BRI; 7 | NZH; 18 | MLW; 6 | LVL; 11 | | | | | | | | | | | | | | | | | | |
| 1996 | Nathan Buttke | 75 | Chevy | | | | | | | | | | | | I70; 7 | IRP; 8 | FLM; 19 | GLN; 29 | NSV; 28 | RCH; 6 | NHA; 17 | MAR; 28 | NWS; 21 | SON; 27 | MMR; 14 | PHO; 25 | LVS; 33 | | | | | |
| 1997 | Dan Press | 75 | Chevy | WDW; 28 | TUS; 32 | HOM; 14 | PHO; 27 | POR; 18 | EVG; 21 | I70; 28 | NHA; 30 | TEX; 26 | BRI; 21 | NZH; 12 | MLW; 25 | LVL; 28 | | | | | | | | | | | | | | | 23rd | 2324 |
| 1997 | Kevin Harvick | 75 | Chevy | | | | | | | | | | | | | | CNS; 20 | HPT; 30 | IRP; 23 | FLM; 23 | NSV; 16 | GLN; 23 | RCH; DNQ | | SON; 33 | MMR; 8 | CAL; 20 | PHO; 34 | LVS; 8 | | 23rd | 2324 |
| 1997 | Rick Markle | 75 | Chevy | | | | | | | | | | | | | | | | | | | | | MAR; DNQ | | | | | | | 23rd | 2324 |
| 1998 | Kevin Harvick | 75 | Chevy | WDW; 18 | HOM; 13 | PHO; 13 | POR; 14 | EVG; 31 | I70; 26 | GLN; 29 | TEX; 4 | BRI; 22 | MLW; 11 | NZH; 14 | CAL; 30 | PPR; 15 | IRP; 11 | NHA; 7 | FLM; 9 | | HPT; 5 | LVL; 13 | RCH; 25 | MEM; 15 | GTY; 11 | MAR; 25 | SON; 17 | MMR; 5 | PHO; 18 | LVS; 20 | 15th | 3086 |
| 1998 | Lonnie Rush Jr. | 75 | Chevy | | | | | | | | | | | | | | | | | NSV; 27 | | | | | | | | | | | 15th | 3086 |
| 1999 | Lonnie Rush Jr. | 75 | Chevy | HOM; 24 | PHO; 12 | EVG; 17 | MMR; 20 | MAR; 28 | MEM; 33 | | | | | | | | | | | | | | | | | | | | | | 20th | 2539 |
| 1999 | Marty Houston | 75 | Chevy | | | | | | | PPR; 29 | I70; 26 | BRI; 23 | TEX; 26 | PIR; 12 | GLN; 21 | MLW; 23 | NSV; 13 | NZH; 6 | MCH; 21 | NHA; 21 | IRP; 20 | GTY; 32 | HPT; 20 | RCH; 20 | LVS; 13 | LVL; 20 | TEX; 17 | CAL; 20 | | | 20th | 2539 |
| 2000 | Marty Houston | 75 | Chevy | DAY; 18 | HOM; 10 | PHO; 21 | MMR; 22 | MAR; 19 | PIR; 9 | GTY; 25 | MEM; 17 | PPR; 10 | EVG; 25 | TEX; 7 | KEN; 4 | GLN; 17 | MLW; 6 | NHA; 10 | NZH; 19 | MCH; 8 | IRP; 13 | NSV; 18 | CIC; 20 | RCH; 14 | DOV; 7 | TEX; 19 | CAL; 8 | | | | 12th | 2942 |
| 2001 | Billy Bigley Jr. | 75 | Chevy | DAY; 26 | HOM; 24 | MMR; 9 | MAR; 16 | GTY; 10 | DAR; 9 | PPR; 25 | DOV; 25 | TEX; 22 | MEM; 11 | MLW; 7 | KAN; 5 | KEN; 10 | NHA; 15 | IRP; 29 | NSH; 23 | CIC; 32 | NZH; 7 | RCH; 10 | SBO; 15 | TEX; 18 | LVS; 16 | PHO; 32 | CAL; 11 | | | | 15th | 2718 |
| 2002 | David Starr | 75 | Chevy | DAY; 7 | DAR; 6 | MAR; 8 | GTY; 5 | PPR; 5 | DOV; 4 | TEX; 3 | MEM; 7 | MLW; 6 | KAN; 24 | KEN; 8 | NHA; 3 | MCH; 5 | IRP; 34 | NSH; 11 | RCH; 13 | TEX; 3 | SBO; 7 | LVS; 1 | CAL; 11 | PHO; 18 | HOM; 8 | | | | | | 5th | 3144 |
| 2003 | David Starr | 75 | Chevy | DAY; 36 | DAR; 9 | MMR; 9 | MAR; 12 | CLT; 17 | DOV; 3 | TEX; 6 | | | | | GTW; 6 | MCH; 13 | IRP; 11 | NSH; 4 | BRI; 18 | RCH; 32 | NHA; 8 | CAL; 5 | LVS; 2 | SBO; 9 | TEX; 31 | MAR; 9 | PHO; 6 | HOM; 3 | | | 10th | 3292 |
| 2003 | Hank Parker Jr. | 75 | Chevy | | | | | | | | MEM; 15 | MLW; 8 | KAN; 11 | KEN; 10 | | | | | | | | | | | | | | | | | 10th | 3292 |
| 2004 | David Starr | 75 | Chevy | DAY; 12 | ATL; 36 | MAR; 9 | MFD; 9 | CLT; 3 | DOV; 8 | TEX; 29 | MEM; 10 | MLW; 33 | KAN; 19 | KEN; 3 | GTW; 1 | MCH; 21 | IRP; 16 | NSH; 2 | BRI; 7 | RCH; 23 | NHA; 8 | LVS; 10 | CAL; 4 | TEX; 4 | MAR; 29 | PHO; 1 | DAR; 7 | HOM; 3 | | | 6th | 3298 |
| 2005 | David Starr | 75 | Chevy | DAY; 8 | CAL; 27* | ATL; 5 | MAR; 22 | GTY; 21 | MFD; 9 | CLT; 19 | DOV; 8 | TEX; 9 | MCH; 12 | MLW; 11 | KAN; 24 | KEN; 10 | MEM; 5 | IRP; 17 | NSH; 17 | BRI; 8 | RCH; 21 | NHA; 13 | LVS; 3 | MAR; 21 | ATL; 11 | TEX; 4 | PHO; 14 | HOM; 11 | | | 8th | 3148 |
| 2006 | Aric Almirola | 75 | Chevy | DAY; 32 | CAL; 21 | ATL; 18 | MAR; 18 | GTY; 10 | CLT; 9 | MFD; 30 | DOV; 12 | TEX; 32 | MCH; 36 | MLW; 13 | KAN; 18 | KEN; 22 | MEM; 18 | IRP; 21 | NSH; 22 | BRI; 32 | NHA; 29 | LVS; 10 | TAL; 22 | MAR; 16 | ATL; 30 | TEX; 20 | PHO; 22 | HOM; 23 | | | 21st | 2471 |
| 2007 | Dennis Setzer | 75 | Chevy | DAY; 19 | CAL; 19 | ATL; 7 | MAR; 13 | KAN; 26 | CLT; 22 | MFD; 1 | DOV; 19 | TEX; 16 | MCH; 24 | MLW; 19 | MEM; 19 | KEN; 18 | IRP; 13 | NSH; 26 | BRI; 26 | GTW; 19 | | | | | | | | | | | 16th | 2262 |
| 2007 | Clay Rogers | 75 | Chevy | | | | | | | | | | | | | | | | | | NHA; 12 | LVS; 11 | TAL; 15 | MAR; 26 | ATL; 34 | TEX; 33 | PHO; 16 | HOM; 27 | | | 16th | 2262 |

==== Truck No. 79 History ====
NASCAR Craftsman Truck Series results
| Year | Driver | No. | Make | 1 | 2 | 3 | 4 | 5 | 6 | 7 | 8 | 9 | 10 | 11 | 12 | 13 | 14 | 15 | 16 | 17 | 18 | 19 | 20 | 21 | 22 | 23 | 24 | 25 | 26 | NCTC | Pts |
|---|---|---|---|---|---|---|---|---|---|---|---|---|---|---|---|---|---|---|---|---|---|---|---|---|---|---|---|---|---|---|---|
| 1997 | Kevin Harvick | 79 | Chevy | WDW | TUS; 21 | HOM | PHO | POR | EVG | I70 | NHA | TEX | BRI | NZH | MLW | LVL; 11 | CNS | HPT | IRP | FLM | NSV | GLN | RCH | MAR | SON | MMR | CAL | PHO | LVS | | |
