= Mesa Marin Raceway =

Former race track in Bakersfield, California

- Oval (1977–2005)
- Location: Kern Canyon Road (CA 184), Bakersfield, California
- Coordinates: 35°23′40″N 118°53′13″W
- Owner: Marion Collins
- Opened: 1977
- Closed: 16 October 2005; 21 years ago
- Major events: NASCAR Craftsman Truck Series; Lucas Oil 250 (1995–2001, 2003); Ford Credit 125 (1995); NASCAR West Series; Ford Motorcraft Parts 150 by 3M (1977–1982, 1984–1985, 1987–2001, 2003–2005); NASCAR Southwest Series (1987–2005)

Oval (1977–2005)
- Surface: Asphalt
- Length: 0.500 mi (0.805 km)

Mesa Marin Raceway was a 0.500 mi (0.805 km) paved oval race track, located near the junction of CA 178 and CA 184 (Kern Canyon Road), east of Bakersfield, California. It opened in 1977 and was owned by Marion Collins throughout its existence. The Collins family helped start the NASCAR Craftsman Truck Series in 1995, and hosted nine races in that series at the track between 1995 and 2003. Mesa Marin also hosted 45 races for the Winston West Series and for NASCAR's Southwest Tour. The last race was held at Mesa Marin on October 16, 2005, as the track was sold for a housing development to be constructed on the site.

Many of Mesa Marin's events were broadcast on television, including the 1995 Craftsman Truck Series race on ABC's Wide World of Sports and the NCTS on The Nashville Network and later ESPN. Local races were featured, as well as both the NASCAR West Series and Southwest Tour (sanction of that tour changed to SRL in 2007), on Speed Channel and HDNet.

It ran NASCAR-sanctioned local racing, including the NASCAR Camping World Series West, United States Auto Club open-wheel racing, the NASCAR Southwest Tour, and other notable local racing. Nearly 4 million spectators attended Mesa Marin Raceway during the track's 28-year existence.

Marion Collins announced on June 8, 2005, that he would sell Mesa Marin Raceway to a local developer when the city refused to renew the tracks conditional use permit, following noise complaints from people living around the racetrack in housing built after the racetrack was built. The developer was to build new houses on the site of the racetrack, similar to the fates of Ontario Motor Speedway and Riverside International Raceway (now the city of Moreno Valley). Collins stated that he and his family wanted to change routes after 28 years of owning the track. The last races were held at Mesa Marin on October 16, 2005, which included participation by NASCAR driver Kevin Harvick. The track was replaced by Kern County Raceway Park, located about 30 miles west of where Mesa Marin had stood. The new track opened in 2013.

In 2011, the Bakersfield Park District opened Mesa Marin Sports Complex on the site where the raceway had stood. As of 2015 the complex includes four ASA/USSSA regulation softball fields and is zoned for more facilities to be added at a later date.

== Role in Craftsman Truck Series formation ==
Mesa Marin was critical to the formation of the NASCAR Craftsman Truck Series. The track was the site for design, construction and testing of the prototype NASCAR Craftsman Trucks. Gary Collins, son of track owner Marion Collins (and himself a former racer), led the team of designers and fabricators who built the first truck.

The track hosted nine NASCAR Craftsman Truck Series events between 1995 and 2003, with Dennis Setzer winning the final race at Mesa Marin, hosted on March 23, 2003.

== See also ==
- NASCAR Craftsman Truck Series at Mesa Marin Raceway
- West Series races at Mesa Marin
