= Frank Warren (racing driver) =

American racing driver (1934–2024)

- Born: September 8, 1934; Mount Holly, New Jersey, U.S.
- Died: August 26, 2024 (aged 89); Fort Myers, Florida, U.S.

NASCAR Cup Series career
- 396 races run over 18 years
- Best finish: 8th (1971)
- First race: 1963 Pickens 200 (Greenville-Pickens Speedway)
- Last race: 1980 CRC Chemicals 500 (Dover Downs International Speedway)
Wins	Top tens	Poles
0	29	0

Frank Henry Warren (September 8, 1934 – August 26, 2024) was an American NASCAR Winston Cup Series driver who raced from 1963 to 1980.

== Career ==
Warren had led 72 of the 88,863 laps finished in his career. Warren's total career earnings were $625,886 ($2,445,657.13 when adjusted for inflation), while his average finish was 20th place in his entire career. The total number of miles raced in his career is 103,495.4 miles (166,559.7 km).

Warren was one of the last drivers to campaign a Dodge (Magnum) car in NASCAR up until the end of his days in top stock car circuit in 1980. Lack of funds prevented him from rebuilding his Dodge for the 1981 season when the smaller (110" wheelbase) cars were mandated. In the 1980s, he occasionally competed on the ARCA circuit, running a Chrysler LeBaron. Native Tan was one of his consistent sponsors.

Flat tracks and short tracks were Warren's strongest tracks; where finishes of seventeenth place were considered to be routine. His weakest finishes came on road courses where he was expected to finish around 23rd place on average.

== Post-racing career ==
After retiring from racing, Warren went to work at Walt Disney World, where he worked for 20 years. It was in Orlando that he met his wife Annette. They have two sons. He had two children from a previous marriage. On May 17, 2018, Warren was arrested in Augusta. He faced "aggravated child molestation charges" after he was caught being "in a room with a child under the age of 5". The charges were dropped. He and his family settled down in Southwest Florida.

Warren was also a veteran. He died from complications of Alzheimer's disease on August 26, 2024, at the age of 89.

== Motorsports results ==
=== NASCAR ===
(key) (Bold – Pole position awarded by qualifying time. Italics – Pole position earned by points standings or practice time. * – Most laps led.)

==== Grand National Series ====
NASCAR Grand National Series results
Year	Team	No.	Make	1	2	3	4	5	6	7	8	9	10	11	12	13	14	15	16	17	18	19	20	21	22	23	24	25	26	27	28	29	30	31	32	33	34	35	36	37	38	39	40	41	42	43	44	45	46	47	48	49	50	51	52	53	54	55	56	57	58	59	60	61	62	NGNC	Pts	Ref
1963	N/A	X	Pontiac	BIR	GGS	THS	RSD	DAY	DAY	DAY	PIF	AWS	HBO	ATL	HCY	BRI	AUG	RCH	GPS	SBO	BGS	MAR	NWS	CLB	THS	DAR	ODS	RCH	CLT	BIR	ATL	DAY	MBS	SVH	DTS	BGS	ASH	OBS	BRR	BRI	GPS; 9	NSV	CLB; 14	AWS	PIF	BGS	ONA	DAR	HCY	RCH	MAR	DTS	NWS	THS	CLT	SBO	HBO	RSD								101st	480	
1964	N/A	80	Pontiac	CON	AUG; 13	JSP	SVH; 13	RSD	DAY	DAY	DAY	RCH	BRI	GPS	BGS	ATL	AWS	HBO	PIF	CLB	NWS	MAR	SVH	DAR	LGY	HCY	SBO	CLT	GPS	ASH	ATL	CON	NSV	CHT	BIR	VAL	PIF	DAY	ODS	OBS	BRR	ISP	GLN	LIN	BRI	NSV	MBS	AWS	DTS	ONA	CLB	BGS	STR	DAR	HCY	RCH	ODS	HBO	MAR	SVH	NWS	CLT	HAR	AUG	JAC	68th	1508	
1965	Harold Rhodes	79	Ford	RSD	DAY	DAY	DAY	PIF	ASW	RCH	HBO	ATL	GPS	NWS	MAR	CLB	BRI	DAR	LGY	BGS	HCY	CLT	CCF	ASH	HAR	NSV	BIR	ATL	GPS	MBS	VAL	DAY; 15	ODS	OBS	ISP	GLN	BRI	NSV	CCF	AWS	SMR	PIF	AUG	CLB	DTS	BLV	BGS																			46th	3814	
1965	Harold Rhodes	79	Chevy																																													DAR; 8	HCY	LIN	ODS	RCH	MAR	NWS	CLT; 43	HBO	CAR; 22	DTS								46th	3814	
1966	Harold Rhodes	79	Chevy	AUG; 12	RSD	DAY	DAY; 10	DAY; 13	CAR	BRI	ATL; 11	HCY	CLB	GPS	BGS	NWS	MAR	DAR	LGY	MGR	MON	RCH	CLT; 31	DTS	ASH	PIF	SMR	AWS	BLV	GPS	DAY; 12	ODS	BRR	OXF	FON	ISP	BRI; 36	SMR	NSV	ATL; 31	CLB	AWS	BLV	BGS	DAR; 26	HCY	RCH	HBO	MAR	NWS	CLT; 33	CAR; 16														31st	8334	
1967	Harold Rhodes	79	Chevy	AUG	RSD	DAY; 17	DAY	DAY; 47	AWS	BRI	GPS	BGS	ATL; 36	CLB	HCY	NWS	MAR	SVH	RCH	DAR; 34	BLV	LGY	CLT; 12	ASH	MGR	SMR	BIR	CAR; 38	GPS	MGY	DAY; 12	TRN; 18	OXF	FDA	ISP	BRI	SMR	NSV					DAR; 10	HCY	RCH	BLV	HBO	MAR	NWS	CLT; 14	CAR; 29	AWS														24th	9992	
1967	Harold Rhodes	79	Ford																																				ATL; 22	BGS	CLB	SVH																								24th	9992	
1968	Harold Rhodes	79	Chevy	MGR	MGY	RSD	DAY; 24	BRI	RCH	ATL; 14	HCY	GPS	CLB	NWS	MAR	AUG; 7	AWS	DAR	BLV	LGY	CLT; 21	ASH	MGR	SMR	BIR	CAR; 22	GPS	DAY																																						42nd	611	
1968	Don Tarr	0	Chevy																										ISP; 18	OXF; 25	FDA; 21	TRN	BRI	SMR	NSV	ATL	CLB	BGS	AWS	SBO	LGY								AUG; 19	CLT	CAR	JFC														42nd	611	
1968	Ervin Pruitt	57	Dodge																																							DAR; 25	HCY	RCH	BLV	HBO	MAR	NWS																		42nd	611	
1969	E. C. Reid	80	Chevy	MGR	MGY	RSD	DAY	DAY; 20	DAY; 19	CAR; 33	AUG	BRI; 24	ATL; 22	CLB	HCY	GPS	RCH	NWS																																																29th	1299	
1969	Don Tarr	0	Chevy																MAR; 26	AWS												DOV; 19	TPN; 26	TRN; 21	BLV; 18	BRI	NSV	SMR										CLB; 18	MAR	NWS; DNQ		SVH; 23	AUG; 8	CAR	JFC; 23	MGR										29th	1299	
1969	Frank Warren	96	Ford																		DAR; DNQ	BLV	LGY	CLT; 30	MGR; 15	SMR	MCH; 34	KPT	GPS	NCF	DAY; 13								ATL; 27	MCH; 34	SBO	BGS	AWS	DAR; 15	HCY	RCH	TAL; Wth				CLT; 45															29th	1299	
1969	G. C. Spencer	8	Plymouth																																																						TWS; 30									29th	1299	
1970	Frank Warren	79	Plymouth	RSD; 44	DAY	DAY; 12	DAY; 20	RCH; 21	CAR; 30	SVH; 16	ATL; 13	BRI; 30	TAL; 11	NWS; 13	CLB; 14	DAR; 27	BLV; 15	LGY; 17	CLT; 27	SMR	MAR; 18	MCH; 23	RSD; 27	HCY; 16	KPT; 16	GPS; 22	DAY; 17	AST; 19	TPN; 14	TRN; 15	BRI; 6	SMR; 18	NSV; 11	ATL; 30	CLB; 21	ONA; 14	MCH; 19	TAL; 24	BGS; 20	SBO; 14	DAR; 25	HCY; 20	RCH; 22	DOV; 13	NCF; 21	NWS; 12	CLT; 28	MAR; 23	MGR; 27	CAR; 26	LGY; 9															10th	2697	
1971	Frank Warren	79	Plymouth	RSD; 30	DAY; 19	DAY	DAY; 24		RCH; 28	CAR; 17		BRI; 12					NWS; 12	MAR; 29				ASH; 9																			CLB; 20						CAR; 35	MGR; 10																		8th	2886	
1971	Frank Warren	79	Dodge					ONT; 50			HCY; 13		ATL; 21	CLB; 10		SMR; 14			DAR; DNQ	SBO; 8	TAL; 30		KPT; 11	CLT; 23	DOV; 20	MCH; 29	RSD; 36		GPS; 7	DAY; 19	BRI; DNQ	AST; 25	ISP; 33	TRN; 37	NSV; 15	ATL; 8	BGS; 23	ONA; 31	MCH; 14	TAL; 15			DAR; 31	MAR; 25	CLT; 13	DOV; 13			RCH; 10	NWS; 22	TWS; 36															8th	2886	
1971	Roger Lubinski	88	Dodge												GPS; 23																																																			8th	2886	
1971	Charlie Roberts	63	Dodge																DAR; 32																																															8th	2886	
1971	H. B. Bailey	36	Pontiac																									HOU; 5																																						8th	2886	
1971	Charlie Roberts	77	Ford																												BRI; 7																																			8th	2886	
1971	Neil Castles	06	Dodge																																							HCY; 7																								8th	2886	

==== Winston Cup Series ====
NASCAR Winston Cup Series results
Year	Team	No.	Make	1	2	3	4	5	6	7	8	9	10	11	12	13	14	15	16	17	18	19	20	21	22	23	24	25	26	27	28	29	30	31	NWCC	Pts	Ref
1972	Frank Warren	79	Dodge	RSD; 29	DAY; 18		ONT; 43	CAR; 19	ATL; 25		DAR; 21			TAL; 9	CLT; 9	DOV; 19	MCH; 36	RSD	TWS; 23	DAY; 21	BRI; 29	TRN; 21	ATL; 23	TAL; 34	MCH; 28		DAR; 17	RCH; 18	DOV; 25	MAR; 32	NWS; 16	CLT; 21	CAR; 25	TWS; 38	11th	5788.60	
1972	Frank Warren	79	Plymouth			RCH; 15				BRI; 15		NWS; 20	MAR; 18													NSV; 14									11th	5788.60	
1973	Frank Warren	79	Dodge	RSD	DAY; 16	RCH; 22	CAR; 15		ATL; 16	NWS; 21			TAL; 24	NSV; 20	CLT; 23	DOV; 24	TWS; 13	RSD	MCH; 22	DAY; 19	BRI; 15	ATL; 14	TAL; 15	NSV; DNQ	DAR; 24	RCH; 14	DOV; 37	NWS; 21	MAR; 15	CLT; 35					16th	4992.14	
1973	Eddie Bond	0	Dodge					BRI; 26																											16th	4992.14	
1973	Buster Davis	84	Dodge								DAR; 32																								16th	4992.14	
1973	Ulrich Racing	40	Ford									MAR; 16												NSV; 15							CAR; 43				16th	4992.14	
1974	Frank Warren	79	Dodge	RSD	DAY; 34	RCH; 20	CAR; 20	BRI; 13	ATL; 17	DAR; 17	NWS; 19	MAR; 16	TAL; 18	NSV; 18	DOV; 15	CLT; 17	RSD; 5	MCH; 14	DAY; 16	BRI; 21	NSV; 30	ATL; 17	POC; 19	TAL; 17	MCH; 20	DAR; 12	RCH; 19	DOV; 16	NWS; 18	MAR; 8	CLT; 25	CAR; 23	ONT; 21		13th	820.845	
1975	Frank Warren	79	Dodge	RSD	DAY	RCH; 17	CAR; 18	BRI; 12	ATL; 12	NWS; 12	DAR; 16	MAR; 18	TAL; 24	NSV; 12	DOV; 15	CLT; 19	RSD; 17	MCH; 16	DAY; 17	NSV; 16	POC; 16	TAL; 17	MCH; 26	DAR; 14	DOV; 16	NWS; 24		CLT; 14	RCH; 14	CAR; 14	BRI; 22	ATL; 25	ONT; 17		12th	3148	
1975	Dean Dalton	7	Ford																								MAR; 12								12th	3148	
1976	Frank Warren	79	Dodge	RSD; 11	DAY; 10	CAR; 28	RCH; 19	BRI; 14	ATL; 15	NWS; 20	DAR; 17	MAR; 29	TAL; 10	NSV; 10	DOV; 13	CLT; 18	RSD; 20	MCH; 24	DAY; 13	NSV; 12	POC; 16	TAL; 12	MCH; 23	BRI; 20	DAR; 19	RCH; 26	DOV; 23		NWS; 22	CLT; 26		ATL; 27	ONT; 18		16th	3240	
1976	Dean Dalton	7	Chevy																									MAR; 14							16th	3240	
1976	Henley Gray	19	Chevy																												CAR; 22				16th	3240	
1977	Frank Warren	79	Dodge	RSD; 25	DAY; 11	RCH; 30	CAR; 35	ATL; 27	NWS; 16	DAR; 27	BRI; 13	MAR	TAL; 13	NSV; 29	DOV; 26	CLT; 26	RSD; 15	MCH; 30	DAY; 21	NSV; 12	POC; 19	TAL; 10	MCH; 23	BRI; 13	DAR; 17	RCH; 20	DOV; 22	MAR; 11	NWS; 21	CLT; 33	CAR; 35	ATL; 23	ONT; 16		16th	2876	
1978	Frank Warren	79	Dodge	RSD; 13	DAY; 24	RCH; 14	CAR; 12	ATL; 19	BRI; 13	DAR; 17	NWS; 22	MAR; 22	TAL; 29	DOV; 27	CLT; DNQ	NSV; 16	RSD; 29	MCH; 20	DAY; 17	NSV; 13	POC; 18	TAL; 33	MCH; 24	BRI; 15	DAR; 12	RCH; 23	DOV; 21	MAR; 21	NWS; 24	CLT; 25	CAR; 16	ATL; 33	ONT; 23		14th	3036	
1978	Frank Warren	19	Dodge												CLT; 23																				14th	3036	
1979	Frank Warren	79	Dodge	RSD; 27	DAY; 10	CAR; 9	RCH; 21	ATL; 22	NWS; 17	BRI; 20	DAR; 17	MAR; 18	TAL; 8	NSV; 20	DOV; 21	CLT; 21	TWS; 19	RSD; 22	MCH; 22	DAY; 40	NSV; 14	POC; 19	TAL; 23	MCH; 16	BRI; 17	DAR; 22	RCH; 26	DOV; 18	MAR; 16	CLT; 19	NWS; 26	CAR; 24	ATL; 21	ONT; 25	16th	3199	
1980	Frank Warren	79	Dodge	RSD	DAY; QL†	RCH	CAR	ATL; 20	BRI	DAR	NWS	MAR	TAL; 19	NSV	DOV	CLT	TWS; 17	RSD	MCH	DAY	NSV	POC	TAL; 33	MCH; 31	BRI	DAR; 23	RCH								40th	559	
1980	Frank Warren	9	Dodge																									DOV; 25	NWS	MAR	CLT	CAR	ATL	ONT	40th	559	
^{†} – Qualified but replaced by Jim Hurlbert

===== Daytona 500 =====
Year	Team	Manufacturer	Start	Finish
1966	Harold Rhodes	Chevrolet	20	16
1967	Harold Rhodes	Chevrolet	35	47
1968	Harold Rhodes	Chevrolet	31	24
1969	E. C. Reid	Chevrolet	50	19
1970	Frank Warren	Plymouth	24	20
1971	Frank Warren	Plymouth	37	24
1972	Frank Warren	Dodge	7	18
1973	Frank Warren	Dodge	34	16
1974	Frank Warren	Dodge	28	34
1976	Frank Warren	Dodge	34	10
1977	Frank Warren	Dodge	33	11
1978	Frank Warren	Dodge	34	24
1979	Frank Warren	Dodge	24	10
1980	Frank Warren	Dodge	QL^{†}	
^{†} - Qualified but replaced by Jim Hurlbert
