= Wendell Scott =

American racing driver (1921–1990)

- Scott in 1969
- Born: Wendell Oliver Scott; August 29, 1921; Danville, Virginia, U.S.
- Died: December 23, 1990 (aged 69); Danville, Virginia, U.S.
- Achievements: First African-American NASCAR driver First African-American winner in the NASCAR Grand National Series
- Awards: International Motorsports Hall of Fame (1999); NASCAR Hall of Fame (2015)

NASCAR Cup Series career
- 495 races run over 13 years
- Best finish: 6th (1966)
- First race: 1961 Spartanburg 200 (Spartanburg)
- Last race: 1973 National 500 (Charlotte)
- First win: 1964 Jacksonville 200 (Jacksonville)
Wins	Top tens	Poles
1	147	1

NASCAR Grand National East Series career
- 17 races run over 2 years
- Best finish: 7th (1972)
- First race: 1972 Bold City 200 (Jacksonville)
- Last race: 1973 Buddy Shuman 100 (Hickory)
Wins	Top tens	Poles
0	5	0

Wendell Oliver Scott Sr. (August 29, 1921 – December 23, 1990) was an American stock car racing driver. He was the first African-American driver and team owner to compete and win in all divisions of NASCAR at its highest level.

Scott began his racing career in local circuits in the late 1940s and obtained his NASCAR license in 1953, making him the first African-American ever to compete in NASCAR. He debuted in the Grand National Series (NASCAR highest level) on March 4, 1961, in Spartanburg, South Carolina. On December 1, 1963, he won a Grand National Series race at Speedway Park in Jacksonville, Florida, becoming the first black driver and team owner to win at NASCAR's premier level. Scott's career was repeatedly affected by racial prejudice including being poisoned (Dover) and death threats (Spartanburg, Darlington, Talladega, Jacksonville, and Daytona). Despite these challenges he continued to compete and was posthumously inducted into the International Motorsports Hall of Fame & NASCAR Hall of Fame in 2015.

== Early life ==
Scott was born in Danville, Virginia, a town dominated by cotton mills and tobacco-processing plants. Scott vowed as a youth to avoid such labor, and began learning auto mechanics from his father, who worked as a driver and mechanic for two well-to-do white families. Scott also raced bicycles against white children in the neighborhood. As a teen he dropped out of high school, became a taxi driver, and served as a mechanic in the segregated army in Europe during World War II. He married Mary Coles in 1943; they had seven children.

After the war, he ran an auto-repair shop. As a sideline, he took up the dangerous and illegal pursuit of running moonshine whiskey. The police caught Scott once, in 1949. Sentenced to three years probation, he continued making his late-night whiskey runs.

== Racing career ==
In 1951, the officials at the Dixie Circuit, a regional racing organization, decided to recruit a Black driver as a marketing gimmick. Scott was recruited for this purpose and participated in his first race at the Danville Speedway.

In search of more opportunities, Scott repaired his car with the help of a black mechanic, Hiram Kincaid, and towed it to a NASCAR-sanctioned event in Winston-Salem, North Carolina. Upon arrival, NASCAR officials refused to let him compete due to his race. A few days later he went to another NASCAR event in High Point, North Carolina, and received the same result. Scott decided to avoid NASCAR for the time being and race with the Dixie Circuit and at other non-NASCAR speedways. He won his first race at Lynchburg, Virginia, only 12 days into his racing career.

Scott ran as many as five events a week, mostly at Virginia tracks. Some prejudiced drivers would wreck him deliberately though his expertise also won him white fans, even among his fellow drivers. These other drivers would serve as his bodyguards at events with racist fans.

Scott began the 1953 season on the Northern Virginia circuit after winning a feature race in Staunton, Virginia. He subsequently tied the Waynesboro, Virginia, qualifying record and won the Waynesboro feature race. The Waynesboro News Virginian reported that Scott had become "recognized as one of the most popular drivers to appear here". The Staunton News Leader wrote he "has been among the top drivers in every race here".

In 1954, Scott towed his racecar to a local NASCAR event at the Richmond Speedway and asked the steward, Mike Poston, to grant him a NASCAR license. Poston, a part-timer, was not a powerful figure in NASCAR's hierarchy, but he did have the authority to issue licenses. Scott's license was approved and he became the first Black driver in NASCAR.

Scott won dozens of races during his nine years in regional-level competition. In 1959 he won two championships. NASCAR awarded him the championship title for drivers of sportsman-class stock cars in the state of Virginia, and he also won the track championship in the sportsman class at Richmond's Southside Speedway.

In 1961, he moved up to the Grand National Series. He achieved the most points for a debutant in 1961. In the 1964 season, he finished 15th in points, and on December 1, 1963, driving a Chevrolet Bel Air that he purchased from Ned Jarrett, he won a race on the half-mile dirt track at Speedway Park in Jacksonville, Florida—the first Grand National event won by an African American. Scott passed Richard Petty, who was driving an ailing car, with 25 laps remaining for the win. Scott was not announced as the winner of the race at the time. Buck Baker, the second-place driver, was initially declared the winner, but race officials discovered two hours later that Scott had not only won, but was two laps in front of the rest of the field. NASCAR awarded Scott the win afterwards, but his family never received the trophy he had earned until 2021 – nearly 58 years after the race, and 31 years after Scott had died.

He continued to be a competitive driver despite his low-budget operation through the rest of the 1960s. Despite his successes, he never received commercial sponsorship. In 1964, Scott finished 12th in points despite missing several races. Over the next five years, Scott consistently finished in the top ten in the point standings. He finished 11th in points in 1965, was a career-high 6th in 1966, 10th in 1967, and finished 9th in both 1968 and 1969. His top year in winnings was 1969 when he won US$47,451.

Scott was forced to retire due to injuries from a racing accident at Talladega, Alabama, in 1973, although he did make one more start at the 1973 National 500 in which he finished 12th place. He achieved one win and 147 top ten finishes in 495 career Grand National starts.

Scott died on December 23, 1990, in Danville, Virginia, having suffered from spinal cancer.

== Personal life ==
Scott's wife, Mary, drove the truck that transported his car, and the pair and their seven children attended races. His daughter, Sybil, went on to become a consultant for NASCAR's Drive for Diversity campaign (in 2025, NASCAR changed the name of the program to the "Driver Development Program") which attempts to increase the number of women and minorities in the sport, both on the track and in the stands. His son, Wendell Jr., died in 2022.

== Legacy ==
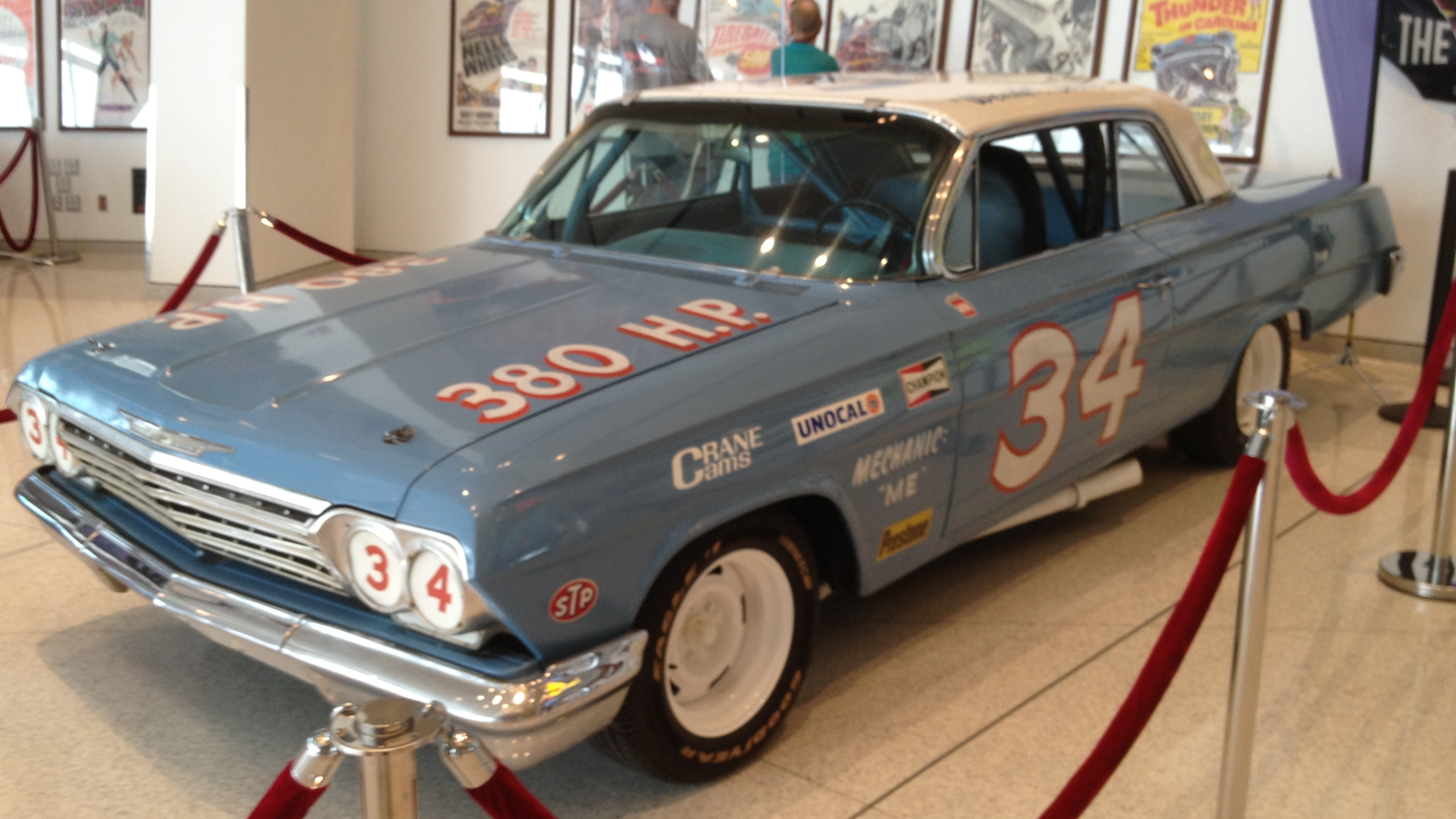
A 1962 Chevrolet built by Scott for the movie Greased Lightning on display at the NASCAR Hall of Fame

The film Greased Lightning, starring Richard Pryor as Scott, was based loosely on Scott's biography.

Mojo Nixon, a fellow Danville native, wrote a tribute song titled "The Ballad of Wendell Scott", which appears on Nixon and Skid Roper's 1986 album, Frenzy.

Scott was inducted as a member of the 2000 class of The Virginia Sports Hall of Fame and Museum located in Portsmouth, VA. He also has a street named after him in his hometown of Danville.

Only seven other African-American drivers are known to have started at least one race in what is now the Cup Series: Elias Bowie, Charlie Scott, George Wiltshire, Randy Bethea, Willy T. Ribbs, Bill Lester, and most recently Bubba Wallace.

As reported in The Washington Post, filmmaker John W. Warner began directing a documentary about Scott, titled The Wendell Scott Story, which was to be released in 2003 with narration by the filmmaker's father, former U.S. Senator John Warner but instead Warner created a four-set DVD entitled American Stock: The Golden Era of NASCAR: 1936-to-1971 which documents many racers including Scott. The film included interviews with fellow race-car drivers, including Richard Petty.

Scott is prominently featured in the 1975 book The World's Number One, Flat-Out, All-Time Great Stock Car Racing Book, written by Jerry Bledsoe.

A biography about Scott's life, titled Hard Driving: The Wendell Scott Story, was written by journalist Brian Donovan. It was released in 2008.

In April 2012, Scott was nominated for inclusion in the NASCAR Hall of Fame, and was selected for induction in the 2015 class, in May 2014. In January 2013, Scott was awarded a historical marker in Danville, Virginia. The marker's statement is "Persevering over prejudice and discrimination, Scott broke racial barriers in NASCAR, with a 13-year career that included 20 top five and 147 top ten finishes". Scott was inducted into the NASCAR Hall of Fame on January 30, 2015.

Loosely based on him, a fictionalized version of Scott was given a minor role in the 2017 Pixar film Cars 3. He is portrayed by Isiah Whitlock Jr. in the form of an anthropomorphized car, with his name changed to River Scott.

A fictionalized version of Scott early in his career in 1955 was featured heavily on Timeless episode 2, season 2. Portrayed by Joseph Lee Anderson, Scott's history as a smuggler, mechanical and driving ability, perseverance, and past and future injustices due to racial discrimination were major themes of the episode.

== Motorsports career results ==
=== NASCAR ===
(key) (Bold – Pole position awarded by qualifying time. Italics – Pole position earned by points standings or practice time. * – Most laps led.)

==== Grand National Series ====
NASCAR Grand National Series results
Year	Team	No.	Make	1	2	3	4	5	6	7	8	9	10	11	12	13	14	15	16	17	18	19	20	21	22	23	24	25	26	27	28	29	30	31	32	33	34	35	36	37	38	39	40	41	42	43	44	45	46	47	48	49	50	51	52	53	54	55	56	57	58	59	60	61	62	NGNC	Pts	Ref
1961	Scott Racing	87	Chevy	CLT	JSP	DAY	DAY	DAY	PIF; 17	AWS	HMS	ATL	GPS																																																					32nd	4726	
1961	Scott Racing	34	Chevy											HBO; 13	BGS; 11	MAR; 24	NWS; 15	CLB; 11	HCY	RCH	MAR; 15	DAR	CLT	CLT	RSD	ASP	CLT	PIF	BIR	GPS	BGS; 21	NOR; 10	HAS; 9	STR; 8	DAY	ATL	CLB	MBS	BRI; 24	NSV	BGS; 7	AWS; 24	RCH; 16	SBO; 16	DAR	HCY	RCH; 14	CSF	ATL	MAR; 28	NWS; 13	CLT; 22	BRI; 16	GPS; 8	HBO; 15											32nd	4726	
1962	Scott Racing	34	Chevy	CON; 14	AWS	DAY	DAY	DAY	CON; 8	AWS; 12	SVH; 7	HBO; 12	RCH; 18	CLB; 16	NWS; 27	GPS; 4	MBS; 9	MAR; 14	BGS; 16	BRI; 8	RCH; 8	HCY; 16	CON; 3	DAR	PIF	CLT; 30	ATL	BGS; 6	AUG; 9	RCH; 14	SBO; 10	DAY	CLB; 9	ASH; 9	GPS; 3	AUG	**SVH**; 8	MBS; 7	BRI; 19	CHT; 12	NSV; 15								HCY; 15	RCH; 21	DTS; 7	AUG; 5	MAR; 19	NWS; 28	CLT	ATL										22nd	9906	
1962	Scott Racing	89	Chevy																																							HUN; 14	AWS; 14	STR; 12	BGS; 9	PIF; 11	VAL; 7	DAR																		22nd	9906	
1963	Scott Racing	34	Chevy	BIR	GGS	THS; 10	RSD; 18	DAY	DAY; 25	DAY; 26	PIF; 5	AWS; 12	HBO; 23	ATL; DNQ	HCY; 8	BRI; 19	AUG; 10	RCH; 9	GPS; 23	SBO; 7	BGS; 7	MAR; 25	NWS; 21	CLB; 7	THS; 8	DAR	ODS; 13	RCH; 9	CLT; 20	BIR; 7	ATL; 20	DAY; 14	MBS; 16	SVH; 13	DTS; 14	BGS; 13	ASH; 9	OBS; 9	BRR; 16	BRI	GPS; 10	NSV; 11	CLB; 9	AWS; 11	PIF; 15	BGS; 11	ONA; 16	DAR	HCY; 25	RCH; 14	MAR; 18	DTS; 11	NWS; 15	THS; 13	CLT; 16	SBO; 12	HBO; 11	RSD								15th	14814	
1964	Scott Racing	34	Chevy	CON; 17	AUG; 18	JSP; 1	SVH; 15	RSD; DNQ	DAY	DAY; 20	DAY; 38	RCH; 24	BRI; 19	GPS; 13	BGS; 12	ATL	AWS; 13	HBO; 7	PIF; 9	CLB; 14	NWS; 16	MAR; 10	SVH	DAR																																										12th	19574	
1964	Scott Racing	34	Ford																						LGY; 4	HCY; 9	SBO; 7	CLT; 9	GPS; 12	ASH; 6	ATL; 12	CON; 4	NSV; 7	CHT; 12	BIR; 9	VAL; 4	PIF; 4	DAY; 17	ODS; 18	OBS; 9	BRR; 23	ISP; 11	GLN; 12	LIN; 4	BRI; 27	NSV; 16	MBS; 6	AWS; 9		ONA; 22	CLB; 7	BGS; 18	STR; 17	DAR; DNQ	HCY; 9	RCH; 21	ODS; 6	HBO; 4	MAR; 26	SVH; 5	NWS; 14	CLT; 22	HAR; 6	AUG; 27	JAC; 11	12th	19574	
1964	Scott Racing	55	Chevy																																														DTS; 8																	12th	19574	
1965	Scott Racing	34	Ford	RSD	DAY	DAY; 7	DAY; 20	PIF; 8	AWS; 17	RCH; 20	HBO; 23	ATL; 35	GPS; 10	NWS; 11	MAR; 16	CLB; 9	BRI; 5	DAR; 15	LGY; 7	BGS; 6	HCY; 8		CCF; 13	ASH; 14	HAR; 9	NSV; 4	BIR; 14	ATL; 9	GPS; 7	MBS; 16	VAL; 15	DAY; 13	ODS; 21	OBS	ISP; 7	GLN; 14	BRI; 7	NSV; 13	CCF; 11	AWS; 8	SMR; 13	PIF; 4	AUG; 9	CLB; 8	DTS; 14	BLV; 5	BGS; 16	DAR; DNQ	HCY; 19	LIN; 11	ODS; 22	RCH; 7	MAR; 25	NWS; 13	CLT; 31	HBO; 14	CAR; 20	DTS; 22								11th	19902	
1965	Fred Goad	70	Ford																			CLT; 26																																												11th	19902	
1965	Clay Eastridge	57	Ford																																													DAR; 10																		11th	19902	
1966	Scott Racing	34	Ford	AUG; 14	RSD	DAY	DAY; 14	DAY; 13	CAR; 33	BRI; 8	ATL	HCY; 14	CLB; 9	GPS; 20	BGS; 18	NWS; 4	MAR; 18	DAR; DNQ	LGY; 7	MGR; 15	MON; 3	RCH; 14	CLT; 7	DTS; 5	ASH; 6	PIF; 18	SMR; 17	AWS; 12	BLV; 31	GPS	DAY; 19	ODS; 10	BRR; 12	OXF; 12	FON; 9	ISP; 13	BRI; 27	SMR; 12	NSV; 9	ATL; 7	CLB; 13	AWS; 6	BLV; 14	BGS; 6	DAR; 24	HCY; 6	RCH; 7	HBO; 8	MAR; 38	NWS; 11	CLT; 17															6th	21702	
1966	Scott Racing	25	Ford															DAR; 26																																																6th	21702	
1966	Pistone Racing	59	Ford																																																	CAR; 35														6th	21702	
1967	Scott Racing	34	Ford	AUG; 11	RSD	DAY	DAY; 19	DAY; 15	AWS; 10	BRI; 9	GPS; 10	BGS; 9	ATL; 40	CLB; 6	HCY; 11	NWS; 13	MAR; 21	SVH; 6	RCH; 20	DAR; 12	BLV; 11	LGY; 6	CLT; 18	ASH	MGR; 9	SMR; 20	BIR; 11	CAR; 30	GPS; 21	MGY; 18	DAY; 20	TRN; 13	OXF; 13	FDA; 13	ISP; 12		SMR; 14	NSV; 12	ATL; 14	BGS; 8	CLB; 10	SVH	DAR; 22	HCY; 28	RCH; 6	BLV; 17	HBO; 27	MAR; 13	NWS; 11		CAR; 18	AWS; 25														10th	20700	
1967	Ron Stotten	94	Chevy																																	BRI; 21																														10th	20700	
1967	GC Spencer Racing	49	Plymouth																																															CLT; 28																10th	20700	
1968	Scott Racing	34	Ford	MGR; 27	MGY; 11	RSD; DNQ	DAY; 17		RCH; 9	ATL; 25	HCY; 19	GPS; 8	CLB; 13	NWS; 14	MAR; 19	AUG; 8	AWS; 23		BLV; 23	LGY; 12	CLT; 23	ASH; 17	MGR; 11	SMR; 11	BIR; 12	CAR; 18	GPS; 8	DAY; 24	ISP; 11	OXF; 10	FDA; 8	TRN; 12	BRI; 19	SMR; 26	NSV; 22	ATL; DNQ	CLB; 8	BGS; 8	AWS; 9	SBO; 14	LGY; 15	DAR; 15	HCY; 15	RCH; 13	BLV; 10	HBO; 19	MAR; 15	NWS; 16	AUG; 21	CLT; 19	CAR; 27	JFC; 14														9th	2685	
1968	GC Spencer Racing	50	Plymouth					BRI; 15																																																										9th	2685	
1968	Roy Tyner	09	Chevy															DAR; 13																																																9th	2685	
1968	Gray Racing	19	Ford																																	ATL; 27																														9th	2685	
1969	Scott Racing	34	Ford	MGR; 13	MGY; 19	RSD	DAY; 26	DAY	DAY; 29	CAR; 20	AUG; 14	BRI; 17		CLB; 12	HCY; 13	GPS; 11	RCH; 24	NWS; 15	MAR; 12	AWS; 10	DAR; 15	BLV; 9	LGY; 10	CLT; 35	MGR; 11	SMR; 22	MCH; 12	KPT; 10	GPS; 12	NCF; 6		DOV; 7	TPN; 21	TRN; 13	BLV; 21	BRI; 19	NSV; 11	SMR; 14	ATL; 19	MCH; 27	SBO; 9	BGS; 9	AWS; 12	DAR; 17	HCY; 16	RCH; 8	TAL; Wth	CLB; 8	MAR; 19	NWS; 19		SVH; 14	AUG; 17	CAR; 9	JFC; 14	MGR; 14	TWS; 18									9th	3015	
1969	Dennis Holt	23	Ford										ATL; 27																																																					9th	3015	
1969	Robertson Racing	23	Ford																												DAY; 39																																			9th	3015	
1969	GC Spencer Racing	8	Plymouth																																																CLT; 17															9th	3015	
1970	Scott Racing	34	Ford	RSD	DAY	DAY	DAY	RCH; 10	CAR; 8	SVH; 9	ATL; 15	BRI; 21	TAL; 20	NWS; 24	CLB; 11	DAR; 16	BLV; 9	LGY; 10	CLT	SMR; 9	MAR; 12	MCH; 20		HCY; 10	KPT; 6	GPS; 11	DAY; 26	AST; 8	TPN; 20													HCY; 19		DOV; 36	NCF; 20	NWS; 15	CLT	MAR; DNQ	MGR; 21	CAR; 20	LGY; 19															14th	2425	
1970	George Wiltshire	34	Dodge																				RSD; 35																																											14th	2425	
1970	Brooks Racing	26	Ford																											TRN; 25																																				14th	2425	
1970	Brooks Racing	34	Ford																												BRI; 18																																			14th	2425	
1970	Robertson Racing	34	Plymouth																													SMR; 25	NSV; 29	ATL; 31	CLB; 12	ONA; 15	MCH; 22	TAL; 22	BGS; 11	SBO; 17	DAR; 17		RCH; 16																							14th	2425	
1971	Scott Racing	34	Ford	RSD	DAY	DAY; 20	DAY; DNQ	ONT	RCH; 23	CAR; 15	HCY; 15	BRI; 15	ATL	CLB; 14	GPS; 21	SMR; 24	NWS; 21	MAR; 17	DAR; 13	SBO; 10	TAL; 19	ASH; 14	KPT; 6	CLT	DOV; 27	MCH	RSD	HOU	GPS; 8	DAY	BRI	AST; 7	ISP; 11	TRN; 19	NSV; 20	ATL; 21	BGS; 25	ONA; 13	MCH; 23	TAL; DNQ	CLB; 12	HCY; 17	DAR; 20	MAR; DNQ		DOV; 20	CAR; 21	MGR; 14	RCH; 28		TWS; 21															19th	2180	
1971	Garn Racing	96	Chevy																																					TAL; 26																										19th	2180	
1971	Eddie Yarboro	13	Plymouth																																									MAR; 23																						19th	2180	
1971	Cunningham-Kelley	07	Chevy																																										CLT; 41																					19th	2180	
1971	Scott Racing	26	Ford																																															NWS; 17																19th	2180	

==== Winston Cup Series ====
NASCAR Winston Cup Series results
Year	Team	No.	Make	1	2	3	4	5	6	7	8	9	10	11	12	13	14	15	16	17	18	19	20	21	22	23	24	25	26	27	28	29	30	31	NWCC	Pts	Ref
1972	Scott Racing	34	Ford	RSD	DAY; DNQ	RCH	ONT; DNQ	CAR; DNQ	ATL; DNQ	BRI	DAR	NWS	MAR; 16	TAL; DNQ		DOV; 20	MCH; DNQ	RSD	TWS; 32	DAY	BRI	TRN; 20	ATL; DNQ	TAL	MCH	NSV	DAR	RCH	DOV; 16	MAR	NWS	CLT	CAR	TWS	40th	1317.5	
1972	Howard & Egerton Racing	34	Chevy												CLT; 22																				40th	1317.5	
1973	Scott Racing	34	Ford	RSD	DAY	RCH	CAR	BRI	ATL	NWS	DAR; 14	MAR																							61st	–	
1973	Scott Racing	34	Mercury										TAL; 55	NSV	CLT	DOV	TWS	RSD	MCH	DAY	BRI	ATL	TAL	NSV	DAR	RCH	DOV	NWS	MAR						61st	–	
1973	Faustina Racing	5	Dodge																											CLT; 12	CAR				61st	–	

===== Daytona 500 =====
Year	Team	Manufacturer	Start	Finish
1963	Scott Racing	Chevrolet	41	26
1964	Scott Racing	Chevrolet	40	38
1965	Scott Racing	Ford	14	20
1966	Scott Racing	Ford	28	13
1967	Scott Racing	Ford	38	15
1968	Scott Racing	Ford	42	17
1969	Scott Racing	Ford	49	29
1971	Scott Racing	Ford	DNQ	
1972	Scott Racing	Ford	DNQ	
