= Bobby Isaac =

American racing driver (1932–1977)

- Isaac in 1969
- Born: Robert Vance Isaac; August 1, 1932; Catawba, North Carolina, U.S.
- Died: August 14, 1977 (aged 45); Hickory, North Carolina, U.S.
- Cause of death: Heart attack due to heat exhaustion
- Achievements: 1970 Grand National Series champion Holds Cup Series record for most poles in a season (20 poles in 1969)
- Awards: 1969 Grand National Series Most Popular Driver; National Motorsports Press Association Hall of Fame (1979); International Motorsports Hall of Fame (1996); Named one of NASCAR's 50 Greatest Drivers (1998); NASCAR Hall of Fame (2016); Named one of NASCAR's 75 Greatest Drivers (2023)

NASCAR Cup Series career
- 308 races run over 14 years
- Best finish: 1st (1970)
- First race: 1961 World 600 qualifier No. 1 (Charlotte)
- Last race: 1976 World 600 (Charlotte)
- First win: 1964 Daytona 500 qualifier No. 2 (Daytona)
- Last win: 1972 Carolina 500 (Rockingham)
Wins	Top tens	Poles
37	170	48

NASCAR Grand National East Series career
- 8 races run over 2 years
- Best finish: 30th (1973)
- First race: 1972 Hickory 276 (Hickory)
- Last race: 1973 Buddy Shuman 100 (Hickory)
- First win: 1972 Albany-Saratoga 250 (Malta)
- Last win: 1972 Coalminers 200 (Lonesome Pine)
Wins	Top tens	Poles
4	6	4
- Statistics up to date as of April 17, 2013.

Robert Vance Isaac (August 1, 1932 – August 14, 1977) was an American stock car racing driver. Isaac made his first NASCAR appearance in 1961, and quickly forged a reputation of one of the toughest competitors of the 1960s and 1970s. He was most famously associated with driving Nord Krauskopf's red No. 71 K&K Insurance Dodge Charger. Isaac was NASCAR's Grand National Series champion in 1970. Isaac abruptly retired from full-time top-level competition in 1973 and died of a heart attack during a late model race at Hickory Motor Speedway in 1977. For his achievements, Isaac was named as one of NASCAR's 50 Greatest Drivers and inducted into the NASCAR Hall of Fame.

== Early life ==
Isaac grew up on a farm near Catawba, North Carolina, the second-youngest of nine children. He finished school after the sixth grade, which led to the incorrect rumor that he could neither read nor write.

== NASCAR career ==
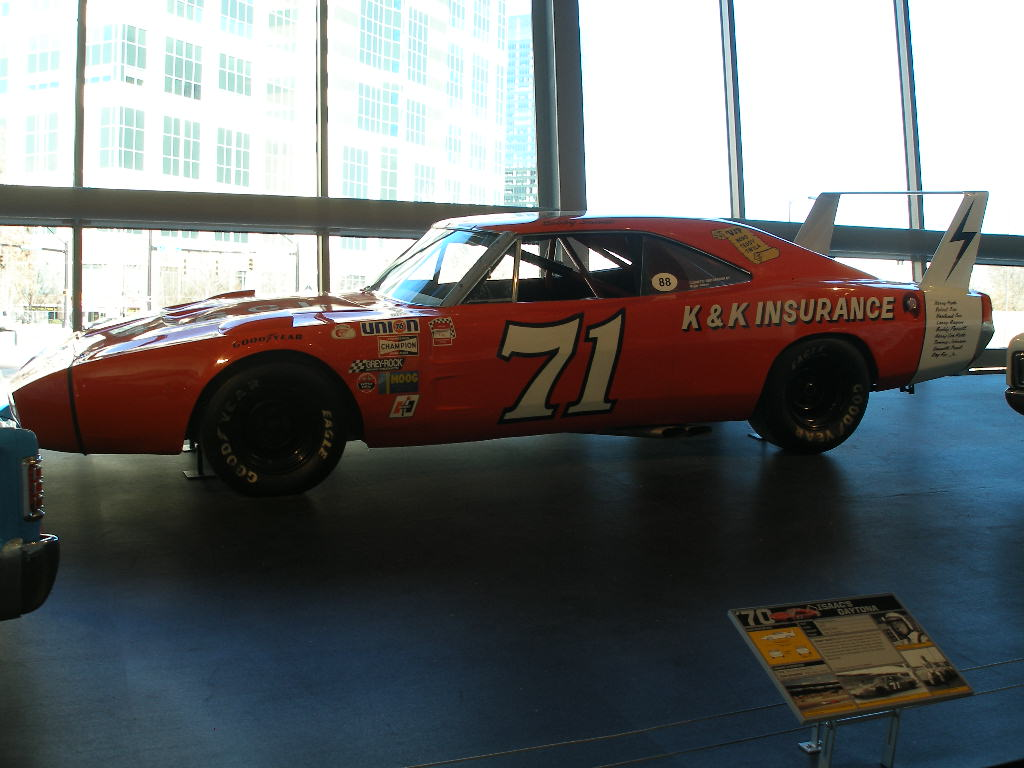
Isaac's No. 71 at the NASCAR Hall of Fame

Isaac began racing full-time in 1956, but it took him seven years to break into the Grand National division. He won the championship in 1970 driving the No. 71 Dodge Charger Daytona sponsored by K&K Insurance. His crew chief was Harry Hyde. Isaac and Hyde took the car to Talladega in November and set a closed-course speed record.

Isaac won 37 races in NASCAR's top series during his career, including 11 in his championship season, and started from the pole position 49 times. Isaac currently holds the NASCAR record for most poles in a single season, with 20 in 1969. In 1970, he turned a 201.104 mph lap at Talladega, a record that stood until 1983.

Isaac dropped out of the 1973 Talladega 500 mid-race in an impulsive decision which surprised his pit crew and the team owner. "I wasn't afraid I was going to wreck...I don't have anything to prove to myself or to anybody else. I know how it feels to win and lose. I know how it feels to be a champion. And now I know how it feels to quit. It just entered my mind at that moment," Isaac said. "I decided to quit and that was that. (Team owner) Bud Moore didn't know I had quit until after the race. I didn't know about (Larry) Smith at that time." (Larry Smith was the first fatality at Talladega Superspeedway, which happened earlier in the race). Isaac did not participate in any further 1973 NASCAR Winston Cup races after Talladega, and the presumption by sports commentators in late 1973 was that he was retiring from the sport.

Ultimately, Isaac did return to NASCAR racing as a driver from 1974 through 1976, on a reduced schedule.

== Land speed records ==
Isaac also made his mark outside of NASCAR. In September 1971, he went to the Bonneville Salt Flats in Utah and set 28 world speed records, some of which still stand.

== Awards ==
Isaac was inducted into the National Motorsports Press Association Hall of Fame in 1979, and the International Motorsports Hall of Fame in 1996. In 1998, NASCAR honored Isaac as one of its 50 greatest drivers. On May 20, 2015, Isaac was announced as a member of the 2016 induction class to the NASCAR Hall of Fame.

== Death ==
On Saturday night, August 13, 1977, while running fourth, Isaac pulled out of the Winston 200 late model sportsman race at Hickory Motor Speedway with 40 laps left, and called for a relief driver, collapsing on pit road of heat exhaustion. Weather reports for the area that day showed temperatures which had reached 91 °F (33 °C) at mid-afternoon, and were still around 80 °F (27 °C) at the time of Isaac's collapse. Though Isaac was revived briefly at the hospital and was conversing with friends, he later died from a heart attack caused by heat exhaustion, at 12:45 a.m. on August 14, 13 days after his 45th birthday.

Details of Isaac's pit lane collapse on the night of his death were given to reporters by friend and former racing driver Ned Jarrett. Jarrett asserted at that time that the reason Isaac left the 1973 Talladega 500 was because he "had heard a voice that told him to quit".

== Motorsports career results ==
=== NASCAR ===
(key) (Bold – Pole position awarded by qualifying time. Italics – Pole position earned by points standings or practice time. * – Most laps led.)

==== Grand National Series ====
NASCAR Grand National Series results
Year	Team	No.	Make	1	2	3	4	5	6	7	8	9	10	11	12	13	14	15	16	17	18	19	20	21	22	23	24	25	26	27	28	29	30	31	32	33	34	35	36	37	38	39	40	41	42	43	44	45	46	47	48	49	50	51	52	53	54	55	56	57	58	59	60	61	62	NGNC	Pts	Ref
1961	Rex Lovette	27	Pontiac	CLT	JSP	DAY	DAY	DAY	PIF	AWS	HMS	ATL	GPS	HBO	BGS	MAR	NWS	CLB	HCY	RCH	MAR	DAR	CLT; 18	CLT	RSD	ASP	CLT	PIF	BIR	GPS	BGS	NOR	HAS	STR	DAY	ATL	CLB	MBS	BRI	NSV	BGS	AWS	RCH	SBO	DAR	HCY	RCH	CSF	ATL	MAR	NWS	CLT	BRI	GPS	HBO											158th	-	
1963	Bondy Long	90	Plymouth	BIR	GGS	THS	RSD	DAY	DAY; 22																																																									20th	12858	
1963	Bondy Long	99	Plymouth							DAY; DNQ	PIF; 11	AWS; 6	HBO; 20				AUG; 7	RCH	GPS; 16	SBO	BGS			CLB; 21	THS												ASH; 16																													20th	12858	
1963	Bondy Long	99	Ford											ATL; 20	HCY	BRI; 27						MAR; 21	NWS; 8			DAR; 21	ODS	RCH	CLT; 11	BIR	ATL; 11	DAY; 16	MBS; 18	SVH	DTS	BGS		OBS; 5	BRR; 9	BRI; 11	GPS; 5	NSV; 14	CLB; 3	AWS; 18	PIF; 14	BGS	ONA	DAR; 11	HCY	RCH	MAR	DTS	NWS	THS												20th	12858	
1963	Smokey Yunick	13	Chevy																																																				CLT; 31	SBO	HBO	RSD								20th	12858	
1964	Nichels Engineering	26	Dodge	CON	AUG	JSP	SVH	RSD	DAY	DAY; 1	DAY; 15	RCH	BRI; 27	GPS	BGS	ATL; 2	AWS	HBO	PIF	CLB	NWS	MAR	SVH	DAR; 27	LGY	HCY	SBO	CLT; 25	GPS	ASH	ATL; 7	CON	NSV	CHT	BIR	VAL	PIF	DAY; 2	ODS	OBS	BRR; 17	ISP	GLN	LIN	BRI; 23	NSV	MBS	AWS	DTS	ONA				DAR; 20					MAR; 7			CLT; 27				18th	13252	
1964	Louis Weathersbee	45	Plymouth																																																CLB; 11	BGS	STR		HCY; 26	RCH; 17	ODS	HBO		SVH; 13	NWS					18th	13252	
1964	Owens Racing	5	Dodge																																																												HAR; 4	AUG; 2	JAC; 17	18th	13252	
1965	Nichels Engineering	35	Dodge	RSD	DAY	DAY	DAY	PIF	ASW	RCH	HBO	ATL	GPS	NWS	MAR	CLB	BRI	DAR	LGY	BGS	HCY	CLT	CCF	ASH	HAR	NSV	BIR	ATL	GPS	MBS	VAL	DAY	ODS	OBS	ISP	GLN	BRI	NSV	CCF	AWS	SMR	PIF	AUG	CLB	DTS	BLV	BGS	DAR	HCY	LIN	ODS	RCH	MAR; 32	NWS; 34	CLT	HBO	CAR; 21									75th	980	
1965	Junior Johnson & Associates	26	Ford																																																							**DTS**; 2*								75th	980	
1966	Junior Johnson & Associates	26	Ford	AUG; 2	RSD; 29	DAY	DAY; 7	DAY; 21	CAR; 37	BRI; 23	ATL; 29	HCY; 3	CLB	GPS	BGS	NWS	MAR	DAR	LGY	MGR	MON	RCH	CLT	DTS	ASH	PIF	SMR	AWS	BLV	GPS	DAY	ODS	BRR	OXF	FON	ISP	BRI	SMR	NSV	ATL	CLB	AWS	BLV	BGS	DAR	HCY	RCH	HBO	MAR	NWS	CLT															53rd	3438	
1966	Owens Racing	5	Dodge																																																	CAR; 30														53rd	3438	
1967	K&K Insurance Racing	71	Dodge	AUG	RSD	DAY; 11	DAY	DAY; 19	AWS	BRI	GPS	BGS	ATL; 5	CLB	HCY	NWS	MAR	SVH	RCH				CLT; 11	ASH	MGR	SMR	BIR	CAR; 16	GPS	MGY	DAY; 5	TRN	OXF	FDA	ISP				ATL; 33	BGS	CLB	SVH	DAR; 6	HCY	RCH	BLV	HBO	MAR	NWS	CLT; 2	CAR; 36	AWS														14th	19698	
1967	K&K Insurance Racing	37	Dodge																	DAR; 8	BLV	LGY																																												14th	19698	
1967	King Enterprises	53	Dodge																																	BRI; 32	SMR	NSV																												14th	19698	
1968	K&K Insurance Racing	37	Dodge	MGR; 16	MGY; 3	RSD; 7			**RCH**; 13			GPS; 2	CLB; 1*																																																					2nd	3373	
1968	K&K Insurance Racing	71	Dodge				DAY; 36	BRI; 5		ATL; 8	HCY; 3*			NWS; 3	MAR; 16	**AUG**; 1*	AWS; 2	DAR; 7	BLV; 2	LGY; 2	CLT; 5	ASH; 3	MGR; 2	SMR; 14	BIR; 2	CAR; 24	GPS; 22	DAY; 8	ISP; 6	OXF; 5	FDA; 4	TRN; 16	BRI; 4	**SMR**; 22	NSV; 4	ATL; 2	CLB; 11	BGS; 3	AWS; 2	SBO; 3	LGY; 3	DAR; 33	HCY; 2*	RCH; 6	BLV; 1*	HBO; 11	MAR; 5	NWS; 7	AUG; 4	CLT; 9	CAR; 17	JFC; 9*														2nd	3373	
1969	K&K Insurance Racing	71	Dodge	MGR; 17	MGY; 4	RSD; 38	DAY	DAY; 1*	DAY; 30	CAR; 7	**AUG**; 3*	**BRI**; 14*	ATL; 23	**CLB**; 1*	**HCY**; 1*	GPS; 1*	RCH; 27	**NWS**; 23	MAR; 23	**AWS**; 1*	DAR; 26	**BLV**; 1*	LGY; 4*	CLT; 5	MGR; 1*	SMR; 1*	MCH; 28	**KPT**; 11*	**GPS**; 1*	**NCF**; 10	DAY; 29	DOV	TPN	**TRN**; 3*	BLV; 17	BRI; 2	NSV; 2	SMR; 19	ATL; 33	MCH; 6	**SBO**; 1*	BGS; 2*	**AWS**; 1*	DAR	**HCY**; 1*	RCH; 3	**TAL**; 4	CLB; 1	MAR; 6	**NWS**; 3	CLT; 41	**SVH**; 1*	**AUG**; 1*	CAR; 16	JFC; 1*	**MGR**; 3	TWS; 1									6th	3301	
1970	K&K Insurance Racing	71	Dodge	RSD; 29	DAY; 2	DAY	DAY; 5	RCH; 4	CAR; 14	SVH; 2	ATL; 28	BRI; 17	**TAL**; 2	**NWS**; 2	CLB; 3	DAR; 3	BLV; 1*	**LGY**; 1*	**CLT**; 7	SMR; 1*	MAR; 1*	MCH; 5	RSD; 16	**HCY**; 1*	KPT; 8	**GPS**; 1*	DAY; 9	**AST**; 17	**TPN**; 1*	**TRN**; 19	BRI; 3	SMR; 2	NSV; 1*	ATL; 35	CLB; 1*	ONA; 10	MCH; 4	**TAL**; 2	BGS; 3	SBO; 2	DAR; 2	**HCY**; 1*	RCH; 4	**DOV**; 6	NCF; 3	**NWS**; 1	CLT; 5	MAR; 4	MGR; 2*	CAR; 7	LGY; 23															1st	3911	
1971	K&K Insurance Racing	71	Dodge	RSD; 4	DAY	DAY; 11	DAY; 10	ONT; 4	RCH; 2	CAR; 2	HCY	BRI	ATL; 5	CLB	GPS; 1*	SMR	**NWS**; 13*	MAR; 3	DAR; 25	**SBO**; 13*	TAL	ASH	**KPT**; 1*	CLT; 32	DOV; 4	MCH; 2	RSD	HOU	GPS	DAY; 1*	BRI	AST	ISP	TRN	NSV	ATL; 33	BGS	ONA	MCH; 39	TAL	CLB	HCY	DAR; 4	**MAR**; 1*	CLT; 2	DOV; 3	CAR; 5	MGR	RCH	NWS	TWS; 49															23rd	1819	

==== Winston Cup Series ====
NASCAR Winston Cup Series results
Year	Team	No.	Make	1	2	3	4	5	6	7	8	9	10	11	12	13	14	15	16	17	18	19	20	21	22	23	24	25	26	27	28	29	30	31	NWCC	Pts	Ref
1972	K&K Insurance Racing	71	Dodge	RSD; 3	**DAY**; 33	RCH; 3	ONT; 45	CAR; 1	ATL; 3	BRI; 2	DAR; 28	**NWS**; 3*	MAR; 19*	**TAL**; 2	CLT; 23	**DOV**; 14	**MCH**; 26	RSD; 21	TWS; 5	**DAY**; 27	BRI; 18	**TRN**; 2*	ATL; 31	**TAL**; 42	MCH; 3	NSV; 27	DAR; 40	RCH	DOV						19th	5050.85	
1972	Donlavey Racing	98	Ford																											MAR; 35	NWS				19th	5050.85	
1972	Matthews Racing	27	Chevy																													CLT; 28	CAR; 36	TWS	19th	5050.85	
1973	Bud Moore Engineering	15	Ford	RSD; 27	DAY; 2	RCH; 4	CAR; 30	BRI; 15	ATL; 2	NWS; 28	DAR; 33	MAR; 3	TAL; 26	NSV; 7	CLT; 4	DOV; 29	TWS; 32	RSD; 33	MCH	DAY; 39	BRI; 22	ATL; 35	TAL; 13	NSV	DAR	RCH	DOV	NWS	MAR	CLT	CAR				26th	3352.4	
1974	Matthews Racing	27	Chevy	RSD	DAY; 8	RCH	CAR	BRI; 2	ATL																										33rd	152.94	
1974	Donlavey Racing	90	Ford							DAR; 33	NWS																								33rd	152.94	
1974	Ellington Racing	28	Chevy									MAR; 25	TAL	NSV	DOV				DAY; 6	BRI	NSV	ATL; 34	POC	TAL; 8	MCH	DAR; 37	RCH	DOV	NWS; 6	MAR					33rd	152.94	
1974	Ellington Racing	29	Chevy													CLT; 33	RSD	MCH																	33rd	152.94	
1974	K&K Insurance Racing	17	Dodge																												CLT; 32	CAR	ONT		33rd	152.94	
1975	Ellington Racing	28	Chevy	RSD	DAY	RCH	CAR; 29	BRI	ATL	NWS	DAR	MAR	TAL	NSV	DOV																				48th	405	
1975	Norris Reed	83	Chevy													CLT; 35	RSD	MCH	DAY	NSV	POC	TAL	MCH	DAR	DOV	NWS	MAR								48th	405	
1975	Puro Racing	75	Mercury																									CLT; 37	RCH						48th	405	
1975	Ed Gibson	3	Chevy																											CAR; 7	BRI; 23	ATL; 30	ONT		48th	405	
1976	Howard & Egerton Racing	6	Chevy	RSD	DAY	CAR; 6	RCH	BRI	ATL	NWS	DAR	MAR	TAL	NSV	DOV																				114th	49	
1976	Neil Castles	6	Chevy													CLT; 38	RSD	MCH	DAY	NSV	POC	TAL	MCH	BRI	DAR	RCH	DOV	MAR	NWS	CLT	CAR	ATL	ONT		114th	49	

===== Daytona 500 =====
Year	Team	Manufacturer	Start	Finish
1963	Bondy Long	Plymouth	DNQ	
1964	Nichels Engineering	Dodge	4	15
1966	Junior Johnson & Associates	Ford	14	21
1967	K&K Insurance Racing	Dodge	23	19
1968	K&K Insurance Racing	Dodge	11	36
1969	K&K Insurance Racing	Dodge	2	30
1970	K&K Insurance Racing	Dodge	3	5
1971	K&K Insurance Racing	Dodge	2	10
1972	K&K Insurance Racing	Dodge	**1**	33
1973	Bud Moore Engineering	Ford	10	2
1974	Matthews Racing	Chevrolet	3	8

Preceded by David Pearson	NASCAR Grand National Champion; 1970	Succeeded by Richard Petty
