= G. C. Spencer =

American racing driver (1925–2007)

- Born: Grover Clifton Spencer; July 9, 1925; Owensboro, Kentucky, U.S.
- Died: September 20, 2007 (aged 82); Johnson City, Tennessee, U.S.

NASCAR Cup Series career
- 415 races run over 20 years
- Best finish: 4th (1965)
- First race: 1958 Southern 500 (Darlington)
- Last race: 1977 Dixie 500 (Atlanta)
Wins	Top tens	Poles
0	138	1

Grover Clifton "G. C." Spencer (July 9, 1925 – September 20, 2007) was an American NASCAR driver who competed in 415 Grand National/Winston Cup Series races from 1958 to 1977. Despite never winning a race, he had 55 top-five finishes and 138 top tens, including seven second-place finishes.

Born in Owensboro, Kentucky, Spencer was a dominant short-track racer in the 1940s and 1950s. He served in World War II with the U.S. Navy.

Spencer drove for his own independent team for most of his career, and was one of the most successful independents of the day. His best season came in 1965, when he finished fourth in points with 14 top-five finishes and 25 top-tens and his only career pole. Although he drove GM and Chrysler cars for most of his career, he drove Fords in 1965, where he found most of his success.

Spencer sold his team and equipment in 1983, and his No. 49 became the No. 4 of Morgan-McClure Motorsports. Spencer acted as the team manager to the team for its first three years.

Spencer died in 2007 at the age of 82.

== Motorsports career results ==
=== NASCAR ===
(key) (Bold – Pole position awarded by qualifying time. Italics – Pole position earned by points standings or practice time. * – Most laps led.)

==== Grand National Series ====
NASCAR Grand National Series results
Year	Team	No.	Make	1	2	3	4	5	6	7	8	9	10	11	12	13	14	15	16	17	18	19	20	21	22	23	24	25	26	27	28	29	30	31	32	33	34	35	36	37	38	39	40	41	42	43	44	45	46	47	48	49	50	51	52	53	54	55	56	57	58	59	60	61	62	NGNC	Pts	Ref
1958	Buck Baker Racing	86	Chevy	FAY	DAB	CON	FAY	WIL	HBO	FAY	CLB	PIF	ATL	CLT	MAR	ODS	OBS	GPS	GBF	STR	NWS	BGS	TRN	RSD	CLB	NBS	REF	LIN	HCY	AWS	RSP	MCC	SLS	TOR	BUF	MCF	BEL	BRR	CLB	NSV	AWS	BGS	MBS	DAR; 16	CLT	BIR	CSF	GAF	RCH	HBO	SAS	MAR	NWS	ATL												36th	1040	
1959	GC Spencer Racing	44	Chevy	FAY	DAY	DAY	HBO	CON	ATL	WIL	BGS	CLB	NWS; 15	REF																																																				13th	4260	
1959	GC Spencer Racing	34	Chevy												HCY; 14	MAR; 17	TRN	CLT; 12	NSV; 11	ASP	PIF; 4	GPS; 7	ATL; 22	CLB; 17	WIL; 14	RCH	BGS; 8	AWS; 19	DAY; 34	HEI	CLT; 27	MBS; 12	CLT; 28	NSV; 12	AWS; 12	BGS; 11	GPS; 15	CLB; 7	DAR; 23	HCY; 14	RCH; 14	CSF	HBO; 8	MAR; 34	AWS	NWS; 16	CON; 30																			13th	4260	
1960	GC Spencer Racing	34	Chevy	CLT; 11	CLB; 15	DAY; 14	DAY	DAY; 31	CLT	NWS	PHO																																																							33rd	3986	
1960	Weldon Wagner	48	Chevy									CLB; 9	MAR; 13	HCY; 20	WIL	BGS	GPS; 21	AWS; 5	DAR; 15	PIF; 6	HBO; 18	RCH	HMS	CLT; 21	BGS	DAY	HEI	MAB	MBS	ATL	BIR; 6	NSV; 10	AWS; 17	PIF; 19	CLB; 26	SBO; 15	BGS; 17		HCY; 11	CSF	GSP; 4	HBO	MAR; 16	NWS; 17	CLT; 16	RCH	ATL																			33rd	3986	
1960	Spook Crawford	20	Ford																																			DAR; 22																												33rd	3986	
1961	GC Spencer Racing	48	Chevy	CLT	JSP	DAY	DAY	DAY	PIF	AWS	HMS	ATL	GPS; 4	HBO; 9	BGS; 10	MAR; 15	NWS; 18	CLB; 4	HCY; 4	RCH; 6	MAR; 13	DAR; 17	CLT; 10	CLT	RSD	ASP	CLT; 31	PIF; 8	BIR; 9	GPS; 9	BGS; 8	NOR	HAS	STR; 7	DAY	ATL; 9	CLB; 8	MBS; 16	BRI; 34	NSV; 8	BGS; 6	AWS; 27	RCH	SBO; 19	DAR	HCY; 6	RCH; 10	CSF	ATL; 31	MAR; 11	NWS; 23	CLT	BRI; 12	GPS	HBO											20th	9128	
1962	GC Spencer Racing	48	Chevy	CON; 12	AWS; 22				CON; 7	AWS; 20	SVH; 12	HBO; 19	RCH; 8	CLB; 5	NWS; 11	GPS; 10	MBS; 17	MAR; 12	BGS; 9	BRI; 25	RCH	HCY; 15	CON; 15		PIF; 4			BGS; 14	AUG; 5	RCH; 11	SBO; 19	DAY	CLB	ASH	GPS	AUG	SVH	MBS	BRI; 32	CHT; 6	NSV; 11	HUN; 16	AWS; 22	STR; 10	BGS; 5	PIF; 5	VAL; 4	DAR; 28	HCY; 7	RCH; 14	DTS	AUG	MAR; 30	NWS; 19	CLT; 26	ATL; 16										24th	9788	
1962	Matt DeMatthews	38	Ford			DAY; 21	DAY	DAY; 45																DAR; 28																																										24th	9788	
1962	Ralph Smith	79	Chevy																							CLT; 21	ATL; 26																																							24th	9788	
1963	GC Spencer Racing	48	Chevy	BIR	GGS; 21	THS; 18	RSD																																																											18th	13744	
1963	Fox Racing	03	Chevy					DAY; 11	DAY	DAY; 32	PIF	AWS	HBO	ATL; DNQ	HCY	BRI	AUG; 8	RCH; 17	GPS; 3	SBO																																														18th	13744	
1963	GC Spencer Racing	03	Chevy																		BGS; 16	MAR		CLB; 22												BGS; 18	ASH; 18	OBS	BRR	BRI; 35	GPS	NSV; 21	CLB; 5			BGS; 6	ONA; 6		HCY; 2	RCH; 4																18th	13744	
1963	GC Spencer Racing	58	Chevy																				NWS; 24		THS; 7																																									18th	13744	
1963	Owens Racing	16	Dodge																							DAR; 13	ODS	RCH																																						18th	13744	
1963	Stroppe Motorsports	25	Mercury																										CLT; 9	BIR	ATL; 13	DAY; 9	MBS	SVH	DTS																															18th	13744	
1963	Jack Smith	48	Plymouth																																									AWS; 21							MAR; 23	DTS	NWS	THS	CLT; 7	SBO; 16	HBO; 17	RSD								18th	13744	
1963	Robert Smith	75	Pontiac																																										PIF; 7																					18th	13744	
1963	Jack Smith	47	Plymouth																																													DAR; 24																		18th	13744	
1964	Paul Clayton	75	Pontiac	CON; 20																									GPS; 5	ASH; 8																																				26th	10012	
1964	Paul Clayton	70	Pontiac		AUG; 24																																																													26th	10012	
1964	GC Spencer Racing	03	Chevy			JSP; 17	SVH	RSD	DAY																																																									26th	10012	
1964	Cliff Stewart	2	Pontiac							DAY; 16	DAY; 33	RCH																																																						26th	10012	
1964	GC Spencer Racing	49	Chevy										BRI; 30	GPS	BGS	ATL; 25	AWS	HBO	PIF	CLB	NWS; 12	MAR; 13	SVH	DAR; 16	LGY	HCY	SBO	CLT; 6			ATL; 35	CON	NSV; 5	CHT; 5	BIR	VAL	PIF	DAY	ODS	OBS	BRR	ISP	GLN	LIN	BRI	NSV	MBS	AWS	DTS	ONA	CLB	BGS	STR													26th	10012	
1964	GC Spencer Racing	49	Ford																																																			DAR; 18	HCY	RCH	ODS	HBO	MAR; 12	SVH	NWS	CLT; 29	HAR	AUG	JAC; 3	26th	10012	
1965	GC Spencer Racing	49	Ford	RSD	DAY; 20	DAY	DAY; 10	PIF; 2	AWS; 4	RCH; 10	HBO; 17	ATL; 12	GPS; 16	NWS; 8	MAR; 12	CLB; 17	BRI; 22	DAR; 9	LGY; 21	BGS; 4	**HCY**; 3	CLT; 29	CCF; 7	ASH; 18	HAR; 2	NSV; 8	BIR; 3	ATL; 6	GPS; 18	MBS; 5	VAL; 3	DAY; 3	ODS; 7	OBS; 16	ISP; 13	GLN; Wth	BRI; 19	NSV; 5		AWS; 14	SMR; 14	PIF; 5	AUG; 5	CLB	DTS	BLV	BGS	DAR; 20	HCY; 6	LIN; 2	ODS; 23	RCH; 23	MAR; 37	NWS; 9	CLT; 22		CAR; 4	DTS								4th	24314	
1965	GC Spencer Racing	75	Ford																																				CCF; 10																											4th	24314	
1965	Cliff Stewart	2	Pontiac																																																					HBO; 17										4th	24314	
1966	GC Spencer Racing	49	Plymouth	AUG	RSD	DAY	DAY; 9	DAY; 24	CAR; 44	BRI; 10	ATL; 32	HCY	CLB	GPS	BGS	NWS; 2	MAR; 5	DAR; 5	LGY	MGR	MON	RCH	CLT; 2	DTS	ASH	PIF	SMR	AWS			DAY; 35	ODS	BRR	OXF	FON	ISP	BRI; 22	SMR	NSV; 13	ATL; 27	CLB	AWS; 2	BLV	BGS	DAR; 10	HCY	RCH	HBO	MAR; 40	NWS; 34	CLT; 34	CAR; 12														19th	15028	
1966	Gray Racing	97	Ford																										BLV; 5	GPS																																				19th	15028	
1967	GC Spencer Racing	49	Plymouth	AUG	RSD	DAY; 21	DAY	DAY; 44	AWS	BRI; 25	GPS	BGS	ATL; 10	CLB	HCY	NWS; 33	MAR; 24	SVH	RCH	DAR; 29	BLV	LGY	CLT; 35	ASH	MGR; 12	SMR; 9	BIR	CAR; 31	GPS; 10	MGY	DAY	TRN; 23	OXF; 28	FDA; 3	ISP; 3	BRI; 19	SMR; 25	NSV; 26						HCY; 25	RCH	BLV; 20	HBO; 5	MAR; 7	NWS; 19			AWS; 13														21st	15240	
1967	A.C. Rakestraw	0	Dodge																																				ATL; 8	BGS	CLB	SVH																								21st	15240	
1967	Petty Enterprises	42	Plymouth																																								DAR; 3							CLT; 5	CAR; 37															21st	15240	
1968	GC Spencer Racing	49	Plymouth	MGR; 24	MGY	RSD	DAY	BRI; 32	RCH		HCY; 13	GPS	CLB	NWS; 22	MAR; 21	AUG	AWS; 27	DAR	BLV	LGY	CLT; 43	ASH	MGR	SMR	BIR	CAR; 33	GPS	DAY	ISP; 20	OXF; 18	FDA; 22	TRN; 8	BRI; 31	SMR; 7	NSV; 17	ATL; 10	CLB	BGS	AWS; 29	SBO	LGY	DAR; 38	HCY	RCH	BLV; 4	HBO; 10	MAR; 30	NWS; 11	AUG	CLT; 35																23rd	1401	
1968	Bobby Allison	2	Dodge							ATL; 28																																																								23rd	1401	
1968	Roy Trantham	84	Ford																																																CAR; 8	JFC; 28														23rd	1401	
1969	GC Spencer Racing	49	Plymouth	MGR; 21	MGY	RSD	DAY	DAY	DAY	CAR; 28	AUG	BRI; 28	ATL; 35	CLB	HCY; 5	GPS	RCH	NWS; 28	MAR; 40	AWS	DAR; 7	BLV; 6	LGY; 14	CLT; 4	MGR	SMR; 13	MCH	KPT; 5	GPS	NCF	DAY	DOV; 16	TPN; 4	TRN; 33	BLV; 6	BRI; 18	NSV	SMR	ATL; 34	MCH	SBO	BGS	AWS; 20	DAR; 11	HCY; 18	RCH	TAL	CLB	MAR; 37	NWS; 9	CLT; 30	SVH	AUG	CAR; 24	JFC	MGR	TWS									26th	1562	
1970	GC Spencer Racing	49	Plymouth	RSD	DAY	DAY	DAY	RCH	CAR; 27	SVH	ATL; 25	BRI; 14	TAL	NWS; 30	CLB	DAR; 25	BLV	LGY	CLT; 9	SMR	MAR; 6	MCH	RSD	HCY; 4	KPT	GPS	DAY	AST; 5	TPN; 21	TRN; 9	BRI; 4	SMR; 24	NSV; 36	ATL; 27	CLB	ONA	MCH	TAL	BGS	SBO	DAR; 9	HCY; 7	RCH; 7	DOV	NCF	NWS; 30	CLT; 11	MAR	MGR	CAR	LGY															16th	2079	
1971	GC Spencer Racing	49	Plymouth	RSD	DAY	DAY	DAY	ONT	RCH	CAR; 26	HCY; 7	BRI; 27	ATL	CLB	GPS	SMR; 8	NWS; 9	MAR	DAR; 6	SBO	TAL	ASH	KPT	CLT; 36	DOV; 5	MCH	RSD	HOU	GPS	DAY	BRI; 24	AST; 24	ISP; 5	TRN; 31	NSV	ATL; 27	BGS	ONA	MCH	TAL	CLB	HCY	DAR; 21	MAR	CLT	DOV; 34	CAR; 31																			34th	1008	
1971	Don Tarr	37	Dodge																																													MGR; 23	RCH	NWS	TWS															34th	1008	

==== Winston Cup Series ====
NASCAR Winston Cup Series results
Year	Team	No.	Make	1	2	3	4	5	6	7	8	9	10	11	12	13	14	15	16	17	18	19	20	21	22	23	24	25	26	27	28	29	30	31	NWCC	Pts	Ref
1972	GC Spencer Racing	49	Plymouth	RSD	DAY; DNQ	RCH	ONT	CAR; 30	ATL; 14	BRI; 9	DAR; 36	NWS; DNQ	MAR	TAL	CLT; 39	DOV	MCH	RSD	TWS	DAY	BRI; 28	TRN	ATL; 40	TAL	MCH; 38	NSV	DAR; 19	RCH	DOV	MAR	NWS				43rd	1238.25	
1972	Altheide Racing	0	Dodge																													CLT; 36	CAR	TWS	43rd	1238.25	
1973	GC Spencer Racing	49	Dodge	RSD	DAY	RCH	CAR	BRI	ATL	NWS	DAR; 15	MAR	TAL	NSV	CLT; 29	DOV; 26	TWS	RSD	MCH	DAY; 14	BRI; 29	ATL; 8	TAL	NSV	DAR; 39	RCH	DOV; 30	NWS	MAR	CLT; 39	CAR; 41				37th	1503.15	
1974	GC Spencer Racing	49	Dodge	RSD	DAY; DNQ	RCH	CAR; 39	BRI	ATL; 30	DAR; 36	NWS	MAR	TAL	NSV	DOV; 31	CLT; 25	RSD	MCH	DAY; 30	BRI	NSV	ATL; 21	POC	TAL	MCH	DAR; 6	RCH	DOV; 37	NWS	MAR	CLT	CAR; 35	ONT		38th	96.8	
1975	GC Spencer Racing	49	Dodge	RSD	DAY; 9	RCH	CAR	BRI	ATL; 36	NWS	DAR; 24	MAR	TAL; 22	NSV	DOV	CLT; 38	RSD	MCH	DAY; 39	NSV	POC	TAL; 49	MCH	DAR; 31	DOV	NWS	MAR	CLT; 32	RCH	CAR	BRI	ATL	ONT		40th	634	
1976	GC Spencer Racing	49	Dodge	RSD	DAY	CAR	RCH	BRI	ATL	NWS	DAR	MAR	TAL	NSV	DOV	CLT	RSD	MCH	DAY	NSV	POC	TAL; 25	MCH; 34	BRI	DAR	RCH	DOV	MAR	NWS	CLT; 17	CAR	ATL; 35	ONT		59th	319	
1977	GC Spencer Racing	49	Dodge	RSD	DAY; DNQ	RCH	CAR	ATL; 21	NWS	DAR; 8	BRI	MAR	TAL	NSV	DOV	CLT; 20	RSD	MCH	DAY; 14	NSV	POC	TAL; 31	MCH	BRI	DAR; 37	RCH	DOV	MAR	NWS	CLT; 18	CAR	ATL; 25	ONT		39th	785	

===== Daytona 500 =====
Year	Team	Manufacturer	Start	Finish
1960	GC Spencer Racing	Chevrolet	27	31
1962	Matt DeMatthews	Ford	48	45
1963	Fox Racing	Chevrolet	21	32
1964	Cliff Stewart	Pontiac	32	33
1965	GC Spencer Racing	Ford	36	10
1966	GC Spencer Racing	Plymouth	18	24
1967	GC Spencer Racing	Plymouth	45	44
1972	GC Spencer Racing	Plymouth	DNQ	
1974	GC Spencer Racing	Dodge	DNQ	
1975	GC Spencer Racing	Dodge	37	9
1977	GC Spencer Racing	Dodge	DNQ	
