= Henley Gray =

American racing driver (born 1933)

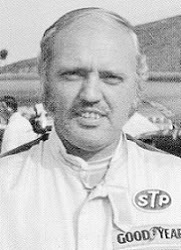
- Born: Clarence Henley Gray Jr. January 12, 1933 (age 93); Rome, Georgia, U.S.

NASCAR Cup Series career
- 374 races run over 14 years
- Best finish: 4th (1966)
- First race: 1964 Nashville 400 (Nashville)
- Last race: 1977 Nashville 420 (Nashville)
Wins	Top tens	Poles
0	60	0

Clarence Henley Gray Jr. (born January 12, 1933) is an American former NASCAR Winston Cup Series driver whose career spanned from 1964 to 1977.

== Career ==
Out of the 76045 laps committed in his career, Gray only led two of them. Gray's total career earnings as a driver is $265,324 in American dollars ($1,409,670.35 when adjusted for inflation) while his earnings as an owner was $538,130 ($1,199,356.77 when adjusted for inflation). His average start is 24th while his average finish is 19th place. Henley has officially raced the equivalent of 66,089.0 miles (106,359.9 km). One of his main sponsors was Belden Asphalt.

Gray would also own vehicles for drivers like Bob Burcham, Frog Fagan, Dale Earnhardt, and J.D. McDuffie in an ownership career that lasted until 1993. The vehicles that Gray owned in NASCAR travelled a distance of 97,899.9 miles (157,554.6 km). These cars had an average start of 26th place and an average finish of 21st place.

== Motorsports career results ==
=== NASCAR ===
(key) (Bold – Pole position awarded by qualifying time. Italics – Pole position earned by points standings or practice time. * – Most laps led.)

==== Grand National Series ====
NASCAR Grand National Series results
Year	Team	No.	Make	1	2	3	4	5	6	7	8	9	10	11	12	13	14	15	16	17	18	19	20	21	22	23	24	25	26	27	28	29	30	31	32	33	34	35	36	37	38	39	40	41	42	43	44	45	46	47	48	49	50	51	52	53	54	55	56	57	58	59	60	61	62	NGNC	Pts	Ref
1964	John Black	81	Ford	CON	AUG	JSP	SVH	RSD	DAY	DAY	DAY	RCH	BRI	GPS	BGS	ATL	AWS	HBO	PIF	CLB	NWS	MAR	SVH	DAR	LGY	HCY	SBO	CLT	GPS	ASH	ATL	CON	NSV	CHT	BIR	VAL	PIF	DAY	ODS	OBS	BRR	ISP	GLN	LIN	BRI	NSV; 20	MBS	AWS	DTS	ONA	CLB	BGS	STR	DAR	HCY	RCH	ODS	HBO	MAR	SVH	NWS	CLT	HAR	AUG	JAC	NA	0	
1965	Gene Cline	97	Ford	RSD	DAY	DAY	DAY	PIF	AWS	RCH	HBO	ATL	GPS; 8	NWS; 18	MAR; 13	CLB; 7	BRI; 26	DAR	LGY; 13	BGS; 13	HCY; 17	CLT; 16	CCF; 10	ASH; 10	HAR; 10	NSV; 5	BIR; 11	ATL; 28	GPS; 17	MBS; 14	VAL; 11	DAY; 39	ODS; 23	OBS; DNQ	ISP	GLN	BRI	NSV; 12	CCF; 9	AWS; 22	SMR; 23	PIF; 16	AUG; 16	CLB; 16	DTS; 17	BLV; 16	BGS; 19	DAR; 38	HCY; 24	LIN; 13	ODS; 24	RCH; 14	MAR; 30	NWS; 29	CLT; 14	HBO	CAR	DTS								26th	9552	
1966	Gene Cline	97	Ford	AUG; 18	RSD																																																													4th	22468	
1966	Gray Racing	97	Ford			DAY; 16	DAY	DAY; 17	CAR; 9	BRI; 9	ATL; 40	HCY; 13	CLB; 10	GPS; 6	BGS; 13	NWS; 5	MAR; 15	DAR; 13	LGY; 11	MGR; 7	MON; 5	RCH; 8	CLT	DTS	ASH; 7	PIF; 7	SMR; 11			GPS; 5	DAY; 23	ODS; 7	BRR; 15	OXF; 17	FON; 10	ISP; 10	BRI; 9	SMR; 9		ATL; 15	CLB; 15	AWS; 23	BLV; 17	BGS; 9	DAR; 22	HCY; 13	RCH; 17	HBO; 11	MAR; 15	NWS; 13		CAR; 18														4th	22468	
1966	Gene Cline	95	Ford																									AWS; 20	BLV; 25																																					4th	22468	
1966	Gene Black	74	Ford																																				NSV; 4																											4th	22468	
1966	Gene Black	75	Ford																																																CLT; 18															4th	22468	
1967	Gray Racing	97	Ford	AUG; 13	RSD; 27	DAY	DAY; 18	DAY; 17	AWS; 12	BRI; 18	GPS; 13	BGS; 7	ATL	CLB; 10	HCY	NWS; 22	MAR; 13	SVH; 10	RCH	DAR; 21	BLV; 16	LGY; 14		ASH; 7	MGR; 6	SMR; 10	BIR; 10	CAR; 27	GPS; 15	MGY; 7	DAY; 37	TRN; 22	OXF; 27	FDA; 11	ISP; 17	BRI; 13	SMR; 13	NSV; 13	ATL; 16	BGS	CLB; 9	SVH; 19	DAR; 19	HCY; 15	RCH; 9	BLV; 30	HBO; 22	MAR; 14	NWS; 25																	17th	17502	
1967	DeWitt Racing	4	Ford																				CLT; 28																																											17th	17502	
1967	Roy Dutton	19	Ford																																															CLT; 12	CAR	AWS; 30														17th	17502	
1968	Gray Racing	19	Ford	MGR; 26	MGY; 13	RSD; 12	DAY; 19	BRI; 20	RCH; 10	ATL; 44	HCY; 12	GPS; 18	CLB; 16	NWS; 12	MAR; 14	AUG; 19	AWS; 9	DAR; 17	BLV; 10	LGY; 20	CLT; 30	ASH; 10	MGR; 17	SMR; 10	BIR; 15	CAR; 12	GPS; 9	DAY	ISP; DNQ	OXF	FDA	TRN	BRI	SMR; 19	NSV	ATL											MAR; 29	NWS	AUG	CLT	CAR; 21	JFC; 16														20th	1559	
1968	Gray Racing	95	Ford																																		CLB; 14	BGS; 20	AWS	SBO	LGY	DAR	HCY	RCH	BLV	HBO																				20th	1559	
1969	Gray Racing	19	Ford	MGR; 9	MGY; 8																																										TAL; DNQ																			17th	2517	
1969	Harry Melton	19	Ford			RSD; 14	DAY; 18	DAY	DAY; 24	CAR; 30	AUG; 12	BRI; 16		CLB; 11	HCY; 17	GPS; 12	RCH; 9	NWS; 25	MAR; 15	AWS; 13	DAR	BLV; 18	LGY; 16			SMR; 14	MCH; 18	KPT	GPS; 11	NCF; 17	DAY; 27	DOV; 11	TPN; 13	TRN; 23	BLV; 13	BRI; 15	NSV; 14	SMR; 12	ATL; 26	MCH; 42	SBO; 13	BGS; 15	AWS; 18	DAR; 39	HCY; 22	RCH		CLB; 16	MAR; 30	NWS; 28	CLT; 21	SVH; 16	AUG; 18	CAR; 38	JFC; 9	MGR; 9	TWS; 17									17th	2517	
1969	Larry Wehrs	00	Chevy										ATL; 15																																																					17th	2517	
1969	E.C. Reid	80	Chevy																					CLT; 40	MGR																																									17th	2517	
1970	Gray Racing	19	Ford	RSD	DAY	DAY	DAY	RCH; 20	CAR; 23	SVH; 13	ATL; 32	BRI; 7	TAL; 34	NWS; 19	CLB; 26	DAR; 12	BLV; 13	LGY; 21	CLT; 19		MAR; 17	MCH; 34	RSD	HCY	KPT	GPS; 23	DAY; 40	AST	TPN	TRN	BRI; 12	SMR; 30	NSV; 24	ATL	CLB	ONA; 18	MCH; 35	TAL; 25	BGS; 15	SBO; 20	DAR; 27		RCH; 18	DOV; 26					MGR; 16	CAR; 28	LGY; 15															19th	1871	
1970	Gray Racing	9	Ford																	SMR; 10																																														19th	1871	
1970	Gordon Racing	24	Ford																																							HCY; 22																								19th	1871	
1970	Gray Racing	24	Ford																																										NCF; 15	NWS																				19th	1871	
1970	Negre Racing	8	Ford																																												CLT; 20	MAR																		19th	1871	
1971	Gray Racing	19	Ford	RSD; 9	DAY	DAY; 19	DAY; 31	ONT; 29	RCH; 19	CAR; 37	HCY; 17	BRI; 9	ATL; 30	CLB; 20	GPS	SMR; 11	NWS	MAR; 13	DAR; 11	SBO; 11	TAL; 40	ASH	KPT; 20	CLT	DOV; 31	MCH; 21	RSD; 18	HOU; 8	GPS; 21	DAY	BRI; 12	AST; 12	ISP; 13	TRN; 33	NSV; 8	ATL; 20	BGS	ONA; 33	MCH; 37	TAL; 43	CLB; 28	HCY	DAR; 12		CLT; 27	DOV; 16	CAR; 18	MGR; 27	RCH; 15	NWS	TWS; 23															14th	2392	
1971	McDuffie Racing	78	Chevy																																									MAR; 27																						14th	2392	

==== Winston Cup Series ====
NASCAR Winston Cup Series results
Year	Team	No.	Make	1	2	3	4	5	6	7	8	9	10	11	12	13	14	15	16	17	18	19	20	21	22	23	24	25	26	27	28	29	30	31	NWCC	Pts	Ref
1972	Gray Racing	19	Ford	RSD; 21	DAY; 14	RCH	ONT; 31	CAR; 20	ATL; 24	BRI; 12	DAR; 34	NWS; 17	MAR; 15	TAL; 25	CLT	DOV; 39	MCH	RSD; 15	TWS; 39	DAY; 22	BRI; 16	TRN; 29	ATL; 30	TAL; 8	MCH; 24	NSV; 7	DAR; 24	RCH; 14	DOV; 19	MAR; 23		CLT; 22		TWS; 39	17th	5093.64	
1972	Robertson Racing	23	Plymouth																												NWS; 27				17th	5093.64	
1972	Hollar Racing	29	Mercury																														CAR; 37		17th	5093.64	
1973	Gray Racing	19	Mercury	RSD; 10						NWS; 24	DAR		TAL; 34			DOV; 13	TWS; 19	RSD; 27	MCH; 34	DAY; 23	BRI; 10		TAL; 28	NSV; 13	DAR; 20	RCH; 9	DOV; 21	NWS; 15	MAR; 14	CLT; 10	CAR; 17				14th	5215.5	
1973	Gray Racing	19	Ford		DAY; DNQ	RCH; 16	CAR; 18	BRI; 19	ATL			MAR; 14		NSV; 25	CLT							ATL; 13													14th	5215.5	
1974	Gray Racing	19	Chevy	RSD	DAY	RCH	CAR	BRI	ATL	DAR	NWS	MAR	TAL	NSV; 13	DOV	CLT	RSD	MCH; 22	DAY	BRI						DAR; 32	RCH	DOV; 9	NWS	MAR; DNQ	CLT	CAR	ONT		55th	15.76	
1974	Dalton Racing	7	Chevy																		NSV; 14	ATL	POC	TAL	MCH										55th	15.76	
1975	McDuffie Racing	70	Chevy	RSD	DAY	RCH	CAR	BRI; 16	ATL; 19	NWS	DAR	MAR	TAL	NSV																					39th	747	
1975	Gray Racing	19	Chevy												DOV; 9	CLT; 28	RSD	MCH	DAY	NSV	POC	TAL	MCH; 27	DAR; 36	DOV; 19	NWS; 29	MAR	CLT	RCH	CAR; 33	BRI	ATL	ONT		39th	747	
1976	Gray Racing	19	Chevy	RSD	DAY	CAR; 26	RCH	BRI; 30	ATL; 23	NWS	DAR; 29	MAR	TAL	NSV; 25	DOV	CLT	RSD	MCH; 33	DAY	NSV	POC; 20	TAL; 17	MCH; 11	BRI; 15	DAR; 21	RCH; 12	DOV; 13	MAR	NWS; 19	CLT			ONT; 37		27th	1425	
1976	GC Spencer Racing	49	Dodge																												CAR; 36	ATL			27th	1425	
1977	Gray Racing	19	Chevy	RSD; 32		RCH; 19	CAR; 16	ATL; 33		DAR; 28	BRI; 23	MAR; 18		NSV; 25	DOV; 32	CLT; 38	RSD	MCH; 22	DAY	NSV; 17	POC	TAL	MCH	BRI	DAR	RCH	DOV	MAR	NWS	CLT	CAR	ATL	ONT		28th	1214	
1977	Wawak Racing	32	Chevy		DAY; QL^{†}																														28th	1214	
1977	Langley Racing	64	Ford						NWS; 14																										28th	1214	
1977	GC Spencer Racing	49	Dodge										TAL; 39																						28th	1214	
^{†} - Qualified but replaced by Bobby Wawak

===== Daytona 500 =====
Year	Team	Manufacturer	Start	Finish
1966	Gray Racing	Ford	31	17
1967	Gray Racing	Ford	36	17
1968	Gray Racing	Ford	49	19
1969	Harry Melton	Ford	39	24
1971	Gray Racing	Ford	40	31
1972	Gray Racing	Ford	37	14
1973	Gray Racing	Ford	DNQ	
1977	Wawak Racing	Chevrolet	QL^{†}	
^{†} - Qualified but replaced by Bobby Wawak
