= 1967 Carolina 500 =

American NASCAR auto race in 1967

Race details
- Race 25 of 49 in the 1967 NASCAR Grand National Series season
- Layout of Rockingham Speedway
- Date: June 18, 1967
- Official name: Carolina 500
- Location: North Carolina Motor Speedway, Rockingham, North Carolina
- Course: Permanent racing facility
- Course length: 1.000 miles (1.600 km)
- Distance: 500 laps, 500 mi (804 km)
- Weather: Temperatures between 72.3 °F (22.4 °C) and 81.3 °F (27.4 °C); wind speeds of 11.1 miles per hour (17.9 km/h)
- Average speed: 104.682 miles per hour (168.469 km/h)
- Attendance: 22,000

Pole position
Driver	Dick Hutcherson	Bondy Long

Most laps led
Driver	Richard Petty	Petty Enterprises
- Laps: 249

Winner
No. 43	Richard Petty	Petty Enterprises

Television in the United States
- Network: untelevised
- Announcers: none

The 1967 Carolina 500 was a NASCAR Grand National Series event that was held on June 18, 1967, at North Carolina Motor Speedway in Rockingham, North Carolina.

The transition to purpose-built racecars began in the early 1960s and occurred gradually over that decade. Changes made to the sport by the late 1960s brought an end to the "strictly stock" vehicles of the 1950s.

== Background ==
North Carolina Motor Speedway was opened as a flat, one-mile oval on October 31, 1965. In 1969, the track was extensively reconfigured to a high-banked, D-shaped oval just over one mile in length. In 1997, North Carolina Motor Speedway merged with Penske Motorsports, and was renamed North Carolina Speedway. Shortly thereafter, the infield was reconfigured, and competition on the infield road course, mostly by the SCCA, was discontinued. Currently, the track is home to the Fast Track High Performance Driving School,

== Race report ==
The 500-lap race took four hours and forty-six minutes in front of 22,000 spectators. Nine cautions were given for 45 laps. Ten of the most notable crew chiefs of the late 1960s would make their appearance here; including Dale Inman, Harry Hyde and Glen Wood. Dick Hutcherson won the pole position with a speed of 116.486 miles per hour (187.466 km/h). Richard Petty recorded his first Rockingham victory by defeating Buddy Baker.

This win would push Petty onto the top of the NASCAR standings for the first time in his career.

Petty's winning dynasty would eventually expand to 200 career race wins and multiple championship wins. Richard Petty scored his 11th win of an eventual 27 wins on a title-winning 1967 NASCAR Grand National Series season. Most of the manufacturers in this race were either Chevrolet or Ford; with a few other brands as the minority on the racing grid. Buddy Baker was the favorite to win the race and was a dominant force on the track alongside Richard Petty and Cale Yarborough. However, a slow pit stop forced Baker to accept second place, one lap behind the winner. Engine problems and crashes were the primary reasons that drivers didn't finish the race.

All of the 44 drivers on the racing grid were born in the United States of America. J.T. Putney would receive the last-place finish of the race due to a crash on lap 2. Johnny Allen and Gary Sain would retire from NASCAR after the end of this race.

=== Qualifying ===
Grid	No.	Driver	Manufacturer	Owner
1	29	Dick Hutcherson	'67 Ford	Bondy Long
2	43	Richard Petty	'67 Plymouth	Petty Enterprises
3	3	Buddy Baker	'67 Dodge	Ray Fox
4	21	Cale Yarborough	'67 Ford	Wood Brothers
5	14	Jim Paschal	'67 Plymouth	Tom Friedkin
6	16	LeeRoy Yarbrough	'67 Mercury	Bud Moore
7	71	Bobby Isaac	'67 Dodge	Nord Krauskopf
8	99	Paul Goldsmith	'67 Plymouth	Ray Nichels
9	6	Bobby Allison	'67 Dodge	Cotton Owens
10	26	Darel Dieringer	'67 Ford	Junior Johnson

== Finishing order ==
1. Richard Petty
2. Buddy Baker
3. Dick Hutcherson
4. Cale Yarborough
5. Darel Dieringer
6. Paul Lewis
7. Charlie Glotzbach
8. James Hylton
9. John Sears*
10. Jim Paschal
11. Bill Dennis
12. Paul Goldsmith*
13. Clyde Lynn
14. Earl Brooks
15. Paul Dean Holt
16. Bobby Isaac*
17. Buck Baker*
18. LeeRoy Yarbrough*
19. Neil Castles*
20. Ed Negre
21. David Pearson*
22. Roy Tyner*
23. Doug Cooper*
24. Elmo Langley*
25. Bobby Wawak*
26. Roy Mayne*
27. Henley Gray*
28. Jabe Thomas*
29. Bill Seifert*
30. Wendell Scott*
31. G. C. Spencer*
32. Tiny Lund*
33. Dick Johnson*
34. Wayne Smith*
35. Johnny Allen*
36. Bobby Allison*
37. George Davis*
38. Frank Warren*
39. Buddy Arrington*
40. Bobby Johns*
41. Ken Spikes*
42. Gary Sain*
43. Armond Holley*
44. J.T. Putney*

^{*} denotes that the driver failed to finish the race.

Preceded by 1967 East Tennessee 200	Richard Petty's career wins 1960–1984	Succeeded by 1967 Pickens 200
