= Gary Sain =

American racecar driver (1931–1980)

- Born: February 21, 1931; Hickory, North Carolina, U.S.
- Died: January 15, 1980 (aged 48)

NASCAR Cup Series career
- 16 races run over 3 years
- Best finish: 64th – 1963 NASCAR Winston Cup Series season
- First race: 1962 Southern 500 (Darlington Raceway)
- Last race: 1967 Carolina 500 (North Carolina Motor Speedway)
Wins	Top tens	Poles
0	2	0

Gary Sain (February 21, 1931 – January 15, 1980) was an American NASCAR Grand National Series driver from Hickory, North Carolina.

== Career ==
Sain's career lasted from 1962 to 1967. His primary vehicle was the No. 80 Chevrolet owned by the Cozze Brothers. Sain has earned a grand total of $3,735 ($36,064 when adjusted for inflation) for racing the equivalent of 1,327.3 miles (2,136.1 km) on the speedways of America. Starting with an average of 20th place and finishing an average of 22nd place, this driver usually finished near the middle of the pack in his 2379 laps of racing action. His worst season was in 1967 where he finished in 86th in the overall season standings.

Sain's only DNQ came at the result of failing to qualify for the 1967 Southern 500.

== Death ==
Sain died on January 15, 1980, at the age of 48.
