= K&K Insurance =

Indiana insurance company

- Company type: For-profit
- Founded: 1952
- Founder: Nord Krauskopf, Theodora Murdock
- Headquarters: Fort Wayne, Indiana
- Key people: Nord Krauskopf, Founder
- Products: Insurance

K&K Insurance is an Indiana-based insurance company noted for its coverage of motor sports. It was started in Fort Wayne, Indiana in 1952 by Nord Krauskopf and his wife Theodora (Teddi) Murdock to manage and market a benevolent fund for injured race car drivers.

The company was sold to Aon plc in 1993 but continues under the K&K name.

Dan Pullen assumed role of program director after K&K purchased the book of business of Pullen Insurance Services Inc.

== Early history ==
As enthusiasts of motor sports, the Krauskopfs understood the risks involved in that kind of work. They designed and marketed products targeted at the motorsport industry, such as race teams, sponsors, and racetrack facilities. They created a racing team to support the business. During the 1960s and 1970s, the Krauskopfs fielded a team for the NASCAR Winston Cup Series. Bobby Isaac (and his crew chief Harry Hyde) led K&K Insurance to a championship win in 1970. This victory brought 54% of Dodges' points needed for a championship victory in the Manufacturer's Championship; breaking a seven-year streak created by the Ford vehicles. These vehicles were mainly Dodge Chargers and Dodge Daytonas.
