= 1970 Alabama 500 =

Auto race held at Talladega Superspeedway in 1970

Race details
- Race 10 of 48 in the 1970 NASCAR Grand National Series season
- 1970 Alabama 500 program cover, featuring the winner of the inaugural Talladega race, Richard Brickhouse.
- Date: April 12, 1970
- Location: Alabama International Motor Speedway, Talladega, Alabama
- Course: Permanent racing facility
- Course length: 2.66 miles (4.3 km)
- Distance: 188 laps, 500 mi (800 km)
- Weather: 68 °F (20 °C); wind speeds of 8.9 miles per hour (14.3 km/h)
- Average speed: 152.321 miles per hour (245.137 km/h)
- Attendance: 36,000

Pole position
Driver	Bobby Isaac	Nord Krauskopf

Most laps led
Driver	Buddy Baker	Cotton Owens
- Laps: 101

Winner
No. 40	Pete Hamilton	Petty Enterprises

Television in the United States
- Network: ABC (second half)
- Announcers: Keith Jackson; Chris Economaki

The 1970 Alabama 500 was a NASCAR Grand National Series event that was held on April 12, 1970, at Alabama International Motor Speedway (now Talladega Superspeedway) in Talladega, Alabama. It was the inaugural running of what is now known as the GEICO 500.

Nord Krauskopf's Bobby Isaac won the pole position, and the race was won by Petty Enterprises's Pete Hamilton.

== Background ==
Alabama International Motor Speedway (AIMS), later known as Talladega Superspeedway, is a motorsports complex located north of Talladega, Alabama. It is located on the former Anniston Air Force Base in the small city of Lincoln. The track is a Tri-oval and was constructed by International Speedway Corporation, a business controlled by the France Family, in the 1960s. Talladega is most known for its steep banking and the unique location of the start/finish line – located just past the exit to pit road. The track currently hosts the NASCAR series such as the NASCAR Cup Series, NASCAR Xfinity Series, and the NASCAR Truck Series. The track is the longest NASCAR oval with a length of 2.66 miles (4.28 km), and the track at its peak had a seating capacity of 175,000 spectators.

== Qualifying ==
Grid	No.	Driver	Manufacturer	Team/Owner
1	71	Bobby Isaac	'69 Dodge	K&K Insurance Racing
2	17	David Pearson	'69 Ford	Holman-Moody
3	99	Charlie Glotzbach	'69 Dodge	Nichels Engineering
4	22	Bobby Allison	'69 Dodge	Mario Rossi
5	6	Buddy Baker	'69 Dodge	Owens Racing
6	40	Pete Hamilton	'70 Plymouth	Petty Enterprises
7	32	Dick Brooks	'70 Plymouth	Brooks Racing
8	43	Richard Petty	'70 Plymouth	Petty Enterprises
9	14	Freddy Fryar	'70 Plymouth	Bill Ellis
10	79	Frank Warren	'69 Plymouth	Frank Warren
11	72	Benny Parsons	'69 Ford	DeWitt Racing
12	59	Richard Brickhouse	'70 Ford	Tom Pistone
13	37	Don Tarr	'69 Dodge	Don Tarr
14	64	Elmo Langley	'69 Ford	Langley Racing
15	45	Bill Seifert	'69 Ford	Bill Seifert
16	25	Jabe Thomas	'69 Plymouth	Don Robertson
17	47	Raymond Williams	'69 Ford	Bill Seifert
18	24	Cecil Gordon	'68 Ford	Gordon Racing
19	63	Jimmy Crawford	'69 Chevrolet	Crawford Racing
20	51	Dub Simpson	'69 Chevrolet	Bill Strong
21	21	Cale Yarborough	'69 Mercury	Wood Brothers Racing
22	48	James Hylton	'69 Ford	James Hylton Motorsports
23	31	Jim Vandiver	'69 Dodge	Jim Vandiver
24	30	Dave Marcis	'69 Dodge	Marcis Auto Racing
25	10	Bill Champion	'69 Ford	Bill Champion
26	62	Ron Keselowski	'69 Dodge	John Keselowski
27	68	Larry Baumel	'69 Ford	Allan Schlauer
28	81	Dave Alonzo	'69 Dodge	Dave Alonzo
29	86	John Sears	'69 Dodge	Dennis Gallion
30	89	Butch Hirst	'69 Ford	Morris Davis
31	74	Bill Shirey	'69 Plymouth	Bill Shirey
32	34	Wendell Scott	'69 Ford	Scott Racing
33	06	Neil Castles	'69 Dodge	Neil Castles
34	19	Henley Gray	'69 Ford	Henley Gray
35	76	Ben Arnold	'69 Ford	Ben Arnold
36	39	Friday Hassler	'69 Chevrolet	James Hanley
37	84	Bobby Mausgrover	'69 Dodge	Buster Davis
38	07	Coo Coo Marlin	'69 Chevrolet	Cunningham-Kelley Racing
39	7	Alton Jones	'68 Ford	Ben Arnold
40	96	E. J. Trivette	'68 Ford	
Failed to qualify
	57	Johnny Halford	Dodge	Ervin Pruitt
	67	Dick May	Ford	Ron Ronacher
	70	J. D. McDuffie	Ford	McDuffie Racing
WD	33	Wayne Smith	Chevrolet	Wayne Smith

Failed to qualify: Dick May (#67), J. D. McDuffie, Johnny Halford (#57), Wayne Smith

== Race report ==
The ABC broadcast picked up the action just after halfway at about lap 100. One of the announcers highlighted what had happened during the untelevised part of the race by showing scale models of the cars that started up front and talking about where they were now. However, the race was hard to watch on television as the announcers and apparently even NASCAR officials struggled to figure out who was leading at the end; making for a very poor and unprofessional finish. The TV crew thought Bobby Isaac was the leader and was confused when Hamilton was given the checkered flag. The broadcast crew left the air before the victory lane interview, thinking that Pete Hamilton won the race.

A crowd of 36,000 was present at the race.

32 lead changes occurred between eight drivers: Buddy Baker, Hamilton, Isaac, David Pearson, Cale Yarborough, Richard Brickhouse, Charlie Glotzbach and Bobby Allison.

Bill Shirey blew his engine on lap 3 while Dale Alonzo inflicted terminal damage on lap 10. Further engine failures on the vehicles of Don Tarr on lap 17, Richard Brickhouse on lap 25, Bobby Mausgrover on the same lap, and E.J. Trivette on lap 73. Henley Gray's steering forced his exit on lap 78. Jim Vandiver overheated his vehicle on lap 93. Two more engine failures as Raymond Williams had to leave the race on lap 107 and Charlie Glotzbach on lap 117. Bill Champion's vehicle developed an oil leak on lap 125 while Bobby Allison lost his engine on lap 126. Elmo Langley could not continue the race due to a faulty engine on lap 149. Water pump issues took Ron Keselowski of the race while Alton Jones had to settle for a 24th-place finish due to engine problems on lap 155. Longtime Alabama independent driver Ben Arnold fielded cars for Alton Jones and himself. Cale Yarborough lost several laps on pit road when his car wouldn't refire, while Richard Petty lost a couple more laps himself when the crew had to go under the hood of the #43 Plymouth.

Notable crew chiefs at this race included Harry Hyde, Dale Inman, Maurice Petty, Tom Vandiver, Tom Ingram, Dick Hutcherson and Glen Wood.

=== Baker's accident ===
Even though Buddy Baker led the most laps with 101 (along with having a nine-second distance between Pete Hamilton by lap 170), pit road problems allowed Hamilton to lap him. Baker began to close in on Hamilton. However, Baker's tire blew heading into the fourth turn on lap 175; fragments of the tire would ultimately damage the engine cooler that resulted in a serious fire for his Dodge. Baker attempted to put out the fire by spinning into the grass.

Baker suffered second-degree burns to the legs and face but was subsequently released from the hospital. When asked about the incident, Baker stated, "it was the scariest thing that ever happened to me. I don't really mind losing this time; I'm just happy to be alive." Baker would finish 12th, as Hamilton led the final 18 laps to give him the victory, with a 44-second lead over second-place finisher Isaac; Pearson, Benny Parsons and Yarborough closed out the top five. The win was Hamilton's second of the season, and Hamilton would eventually win the second Talladega race.

== Finishing order ==
Fin	St	#	Driver	Make	Team/Owner	Sponsor	Laps	Led	Status	Pts	Winnings
1	6	40	Pete Hamilton	'70 Plymouth	Petty Enterprises	7-Up	188	19	running	150	$26,650
2	1	71	Bobby Isaac	'69 Dodge	K&K Insurance Racing	K & K Insurance	188	3	running	147	$12,500
3	2	17	David Pearson	'69 Ford	Holman-Moody	Purolator	187	7	running	144	$8,675
4	11	72	Benny Parsons	'69 Ford	DeWitt Racing	L.G. DeWitt	187	0	running	141	$5,825
5	21	21	Cale Yarborough	'69 Mercury	Wood Brothers Racing	60 Minute Cleaners	183	12	running	138	$4,425
6	9	14	Freddy Fryar	'70 Plymouth	Bill Ellis	Bill Ellis	182	0	running	135	$3,000
7	8	43	Richard Petty	'70 Plymouth	Petty Enterprises	7-Up	181	0	running	132	$2,500
8	22	48	James Hylton	'69 Ford	James Hylton Motorsports	Hylton Engineering	180	0	running	129	$2,300
9	33	06	Neil Castles	'69 Dodge	Neil Castles	Howard Furniture	179	0	running	126	$2,200
10	38	07	Coo Coo Marlin	'69 Chevrolet	Cunningham-Kelley Racing	Cunningham-Kelley	177	0	running	123	$2,000
11	10	79	Frank Warren	'69 Plymouth	Frank Warren		176	0	running	120	$1,885
12	5	6	Buddy Baker	'69 Dodge	Owens Racing	Cotton Owens	175	101	spin/fire	117	$1,860
13	7	32	Dick Brooks	'70 Plymouth	Brooks Racing	Bestline Products	175	0	running	114	$1,785
14	36	39	Friday Hassler	'69 Chevrolet	James Hanley	James Hanley	175	0	running	111	$1,760
15	16	25	Jabe Thomas	'69 Plymouth	Don Robertson	Don Robertson	174	0	running	108	$1,710
16	30	89	Butch Hirst	'69 Ford	Morris Davis	Morris Davis	169	0	running	105	$1,685
17	24	30	Dave Marcis	'69 Dodge	Marcis Auto Racing	Lunda Construction	168	0	running	102	$1,685
18	15	45	Bill Seifert	'69 Ford	Bill Seifert		167	0	running	99	$1,635
19	29	86	John Sears	'69 Dodge	Dennis Gallion	Dennis Gallion	167	0	running	96	$1,610
20	32	34	Wendell Scott	'69 Ford	Scott Racing		165	0	running	93	$1,585
21	18	24	Cecil Gordon	'68 Ford	Gordon Racing		164	0	running	90	$1,560
22	20	51	Dub Simpson	'69 Chevrolet	Bill Strong	Bill Strong	162	0	running	87	$1,535
23	35	76	Ben Arnold	'69 Ford	Ben Arnold		160	0	running	84	$1,510
24	39	7	Alton Jones	'68 Ford	Ben Arnold	Ben Arnold	155	0	engine	81	$1,485
25	26	62	Ron Keselowski	'69 Dodge	John Keselowski	Kaye Engineering	153	0	water pump	78	$1,460
26	27	68	Larry Baumel	'69 Ford	Allan Schlauer	Auto Lad	150	0	running	75	$1,435
27	14	64	Elmo Langley	'69 Ford	Langley Racing		149	0	engine	72	$1,435
28	19	63	Jimmy Crawford	'69 Chevrolet	Crawford Racing	Crawford Racing	143	0	running	69	$1,385
29	4	22	Bobby Allison	'69 Dodge	Mario Rossi	Coca-Cola	126	40	engine	66	$1,410
30	25	10	Bill Champion	'69 Ford	Bill Champion		125	0	oil leak	63	$1,335
31	3	99	Charlie Glotzbach	'69 Dodge	Nichels Engineering	Dow Chemicals	117	4	engine	60	$1,385
32	17	47	Raymond Williams	'69 Ford	Bill Seifert	Bill Seifert	107	0	engine	57	$1,285
33	23	31	Jim Vandiver	'69 Dodge	Jim Vandiver		93	0	overheating	54	$1,285
34	34	19	Henley Gray	'69 Ford	Henley Gray		78	0	steering	51	$1,285
35	40	96	E.J. Trivette	'68 Ford			73	0	engine	48	$1,210
36	37	84	Bobby Mausgrover	'69 Dodge	Buster Davis	Buster Davis	25	0	engine	45	$1,210
37	12	59	Richard Brickhouse	'70 Ford	Tom Pistone	Pepsi-Cola	25	2	engine	42	$1,210
38	13	37	Don Tarr	'69 Dodge	Don Tarr	Coca-Cola	17	0	engine	39	$1,160
39	28	81	Dave Alonzo	'69 Dodge	Dave Alonzo		10	0	crash	36	$1,110
40	31	74	Bill Shirey	'69 Plymouth	Bill Shirey		3	0	engine	33	$1,085
