= 1966 NASCAR Grand National Series =

American motorsport season

1966 Grand National Series

Seasons
- ← 1965 1967 →

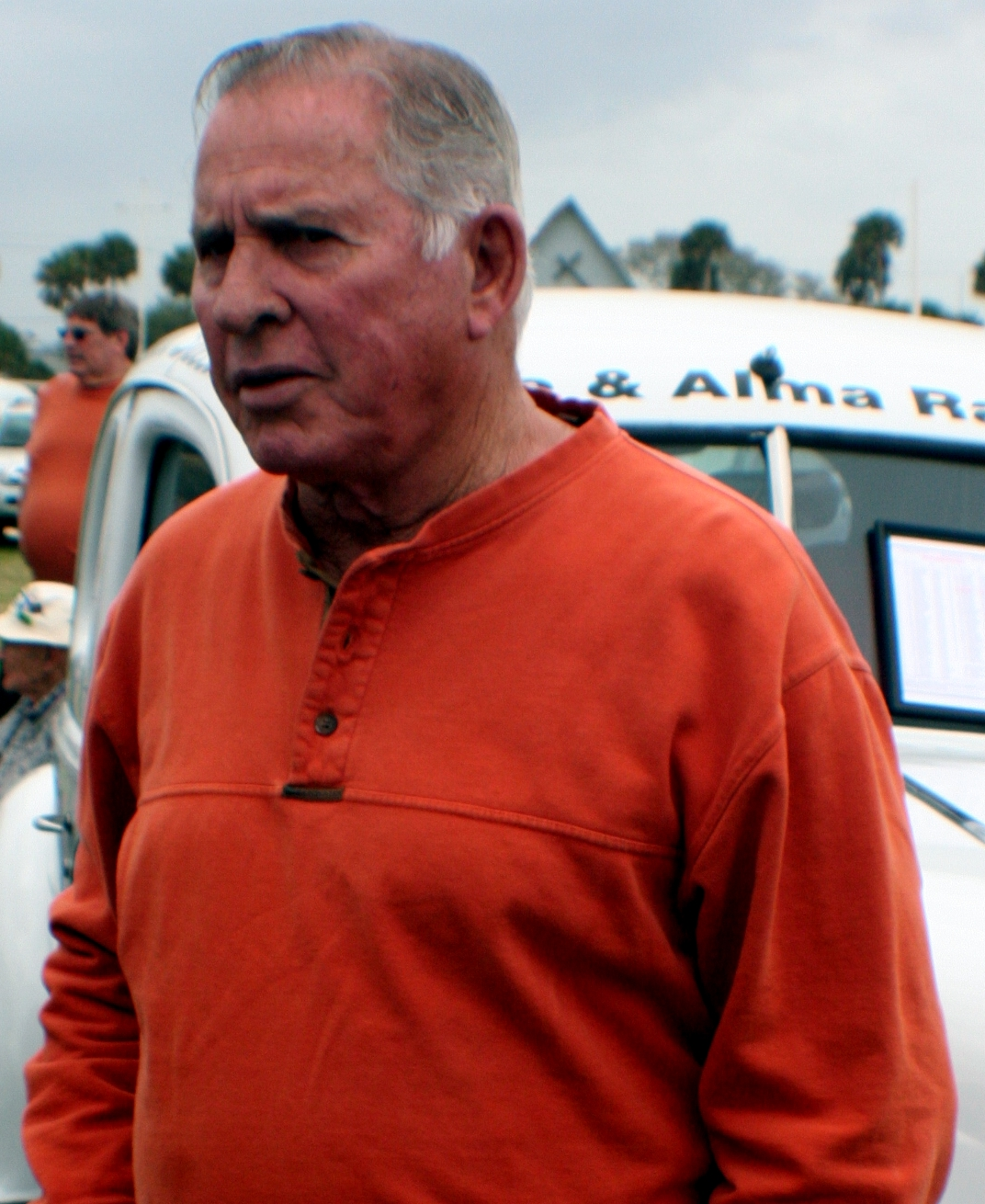
David Pearson, winner of the 1966 NASCAR Championship, here pictured in 2008.

The 1966 NASCAR Grand National Series evolved into the first of three NASCAR Grand National championships for David Pearson, whose 15 wins through the season was second only to Tim Flock's 18 victories in 1955 at that time. NASCAR allowed the return of the Chrysler Hemi engine in 1966, and at the same time Ford decided to boycott NASCAR for the season. The season marked series first visit to the state of Maine. Pearson captured the championship with 35,638 points over second place James Hylton who finished the season with no wins, but 33,638 points for his consistency and efforts.

== Schedule ==
No.	Race title	Track	Date
1	Georgia Cracker 300	Augusta Speedway, Augusta	November 14, 1965
2	Motor Trend 500	Riverside International Raceway, Riverside	January 23, 1966
3	100 Mile Qualifying Races	Daytona International Speedway, Daytona Beach	February 25, 1966
4	100 Mile Qualifying Races	Daytona International Speedway, Daytona Beach	February 25, 1966
5	Daytona 500	Daytona International Speedway, Daytona Beach	February 27, 1966
6	Peach Blossom 500	North Carolina Motor Speedway, Rockingham	March 14, 1966
7	Southeastern 500	Bristol International Speedway, Bristol	March 20, 1966
8	Atlanta 500	Atlanta International Raceway, Hampton	March 27, 1966
9	Hickory 250	Hickory Speedway, Hickory	April 3, 1966
10	Columbia 200	Columbia Speedway, Columbia	April 7, 1966
11	Greenville 200	Greenville-Pickens Speedway, Greenville	April 9, 1966
12	Bowman 100	Bowman Gray Stadium, Winston-Salem	April 11, 1966
13	Gwyn Staley 400	North Wilkesboro Speedway, North Wilkesboro	April 17, 1966
14	Virginia 500	Martinsville Speedway, Ridgeway	April 24, 1966
15	Rebel 400	Darlington Raceway, Darlington	April 30, 1966
16	Tidewater 250	Langley Speedway, Hampton	May 7, 1966
17	Speedy Morelock 200	Middle Georgia Raceway, Macon	May 10, 1966
18	Independent 250	Starlite Speedway, Monroe	May 13, 1966
19	Richmond 250	Atlantic Rural Fairgrounds, Richmond	May 15, 1966
20	World 600	Charlotte Motor Speedway, Concord	May 22, 1966
21	Moyock 100	Dog Track Speedway, Moyock	May 29, 1966
22	Asheville 300	New Asheville Speedway, Asheville	June 2, 1966
23	Piedmont 200	Piedmont Interstate Fairgrounds, Spartanburg	June 4, 1966
24	East Tennessee 200	Smoky Mountain Raceway, Maryville	June 9, 1966
25	Fireball 300	Asheville-Weaverville Speedway, Weaverville	June 12, 1966
26	Beltsville 200	Beltsville Speedway, Beltsville	June 15, 1966
27	Pickens 200	Greenville-Pickens Speedway, Greenville	June 25, 1966
28	Firecracker 400	Daytona International Speedway, Daytona Beach	July 4, 1966
29	Old Dominion 150	Old Dominion Speedway, Manassas	July 7, 1966
30	Bridgehampton 150	Bridgehampton Raceway, Bridgehampton	July 10, 1966
31	Maine 100	Oxford Plains Speedway, Oxford	July 12, 1966
32	Fonda 100	Fonda Speedway, Fonda	July 14, 1966
33	Islip 60	Islip Speedway, Islip	July 16, 1966
34	Volunteer 500	Bristol International Speedway, Bristol	July 24, 1966
35	Smoky Mountain 200	Smoky Mountain Raceway, Maryville	July 28, 1966
36	Nashville 400	Nashville Speedway, Nashville	July 30, 1966
37	Dixie 400	Atlanta International Raceway, Hampton	August 7, 1966
38	Sandlapper 200	Columbia Speedway, Columbia	August 18, 1966
39	Western North Carolina 500	Asheville-Weaverville Speedway, Weaverville	August 21, 1966
40	Maryland 200	Beltsville Speedway, Beltsville	August 24, 1966
41	Myers Brothers 250	Bowman Gray Stadium, Winston-Salem	August 27, 1966
42	Southern 500	Darlington Raceway, Darlington	September 5, 1966
43	Buddy Shuman 276	Hickory Speedway, Hickory	September 9, 1966
44	Capital City 300	Atlantic Rural Fairgrounds, Richmond	September 11, 1966
45	Joe Weatherly 150	Orange Speedway, Hillsborough	September 18, 1966
46	Old Dominion 500	Martinsville Speedway, Ridgeway	September 25, 1966
47	Wilkes 400	North Wilkesboro Speedway, North Wilkesboro	October 2, 1966
48	National 500	Charlotte Motor Speedway, Concord	October 16, 1966
49	American 500	North Carolina Motor Speedway, Rockingham	October 30, 1966

== Season recap ==
The 1966 NASCAR season was affected by Ford's withdrawal of financial support from the series (though teams continued to race Fords), and NASCAR allowing Chrysler drivers to run the Hemi engine. While Ford's departure had the effect of lowering attendance, the strong Hemi engine coupled with reduced competition meant that Chrysler drivers were particularly successful during the season. David Pearson in his Dodges took a total of 15 victories, Richard Petty in his Plymouth captured another 8, and Paul Goldsmith, Jim Paschal, Earl Balmer, LeeRoy Yarbrough, Jim Hurtubise, Marvin Panch, Paul Lewis, and Sam McQuagg all reached pole position in MoPar powered equipment. By the end of the 1966 NASCAR season, Chrysler vehicles drove to victory lane a total of 34 times in 49 events, after winning only six races in the 1965 season. Pearson, nicknamed "The Silver Fox", won his 15 events in 42 starts that season with a total of 35,638 points over second place Hylton (33,688 points), and 1964 season champion Richard Petty (22,952 points). While newcomer Hylton was unable to win an event in 1966, his 20 top five finishes, and 32 top ten finishes earned him not only second place in the point standings, but NASCAR Rookie of the Year honors as well. When the season was concluded Ford won the "NASCAR Manufacturers' Championship" with 1,047 points over Plymouth (633 points) and third place Dodge (632 points).

Mid-size cars would first be implemented for this NASCAR Grand National Cup Series season. Ten years later, the rising price of gas for passenger vehicles caused all car classes to shrink. Automakers moved previously "full-size" nameplates to smaller platforms.

== Race summaries ==
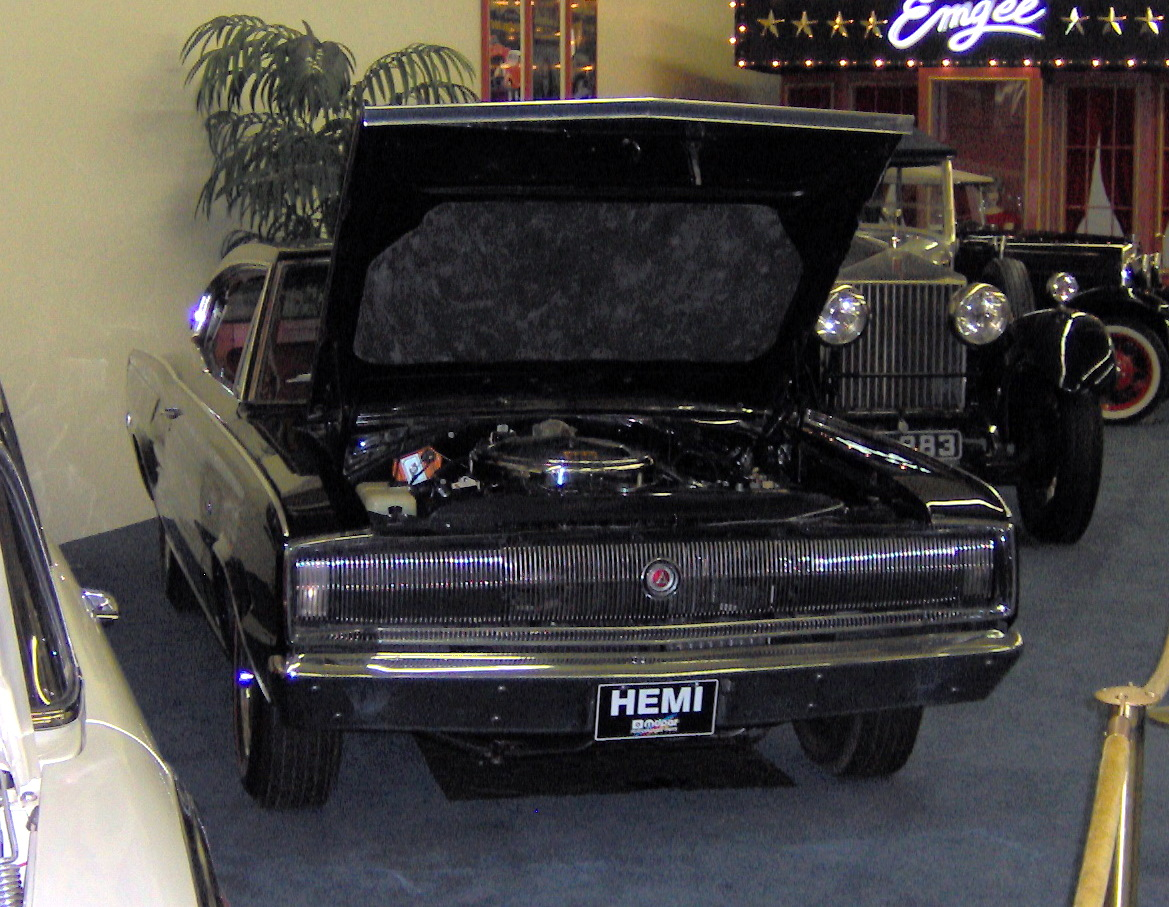
A 1966 Dodge Charger displays the 426 c.i. Hemi engine which dominated the 1966 NASCAR season

The 1966 NASCAR season opened at Augusta Speedway on November 14, 1965, with Richard Petty winning the season opening event in a 1965 Plymouth. NASCAR then ventured to Riverside International Raceway where Dan Gurney took the checkered flag in a 1965 Ford. After the January 23rd Riverside event, the drivers and teams traveled to Daytona International Speedway in Florida for the 1966 Daytona 500. Paul Goldsmith and Early Balmer took the qualifying events, while Richard Petty notched his first and only Daytona 500 pole position. Petty came from two laps down during the competition to win by more than a full lap when the race was halted 2 laps shy of scheduled 500-mile (800 km) event due to thunderstorms. In March Paul Goldsmith won at Rockingham Speedway, Dick Hutcherson at Bristol, and Jim Hurtubise captured the checkered flag at Atlanta Motor Speedway. Hutcherson's victory at Bristol was by more than 4 laps over the closest competitor, Paul Lewis, when crashes and attrition left only seven cars of the 38 starters running at the end of the Southeastern 500 (now known as Food City 500). On April 3, Pearson finally found his way to victory lane in the first of four consecutive victories at Hickory Motor Speedway. He followed up with wins at Columbia Speedway, Greenville, and Winston-Salem, before Jim Paschal broke his streak at North Wilksboro and repeated at Martinsville Speedway. On May 7, Richard Petty started a string of three consecutive wins at Darlington Raceway, Hampton, and Macon. After Ford's announcement of their boycott of NASCAR on April 7, only 2.500 fans attend the May 13th event in which Darel Dieringer captures the win at Monroe in a 125-mile (201 km) contest.

Even though Ford had withdrawn their financial support from NASCAR in April, the series opened June at Spartanburg, S.C. with a resounding domination of the event by Ford vehicles. The Fords led every lap of the 100-mile (160 km) event, and Elmo Langley found victory lane at the .5-mile (0.80 km) venue when promoters refused to allow the Chrysler cars to run; because of the Ford boycott. Pearson then won a 100-mile (160 km) event at Maryville, followed by another Petty victory at Weaverville. Tiny Lund broke into the winners circle at Beltsville, and Pearson notched another checkered flag at the Greenville in his 1964 Dodge to close out the month of June.

On July 4, 1966 the fans, drivers, and teams returned to Daytona for the Firecracker 400 (now Coke Zero 400), and second year driver Sam McQuagg drove his Dodge 400-mile (640 km) to capture his first NASCAR win. McQuaggs Dodge Charger was equipped with an aluminum strip attached to the decklid of his car, and the rear spoiler makes its debut in NASCAR racing. The following weekend NASCAR legend Bobby Allison drives 100-mile (160 km) to victory lane in Oxford, Maine. The win is Allison's first major NASCAR win, and Chevrolet's first visit to victory circle since October 13, 1963. Pearson grabbed another win the following week at Fonda Speedway in New York, and Allison captured a second win at Islip NY. Paul Goldsmith and Paul Lewis garnered wins at Bristol and Maryville respectively, and Richard Petty closed out the month of July with a win at Nashville.

NASCAR started the month of August at the Atlanta International Raceway, but not without controversy. David Pearson was disqualified from the Dixie 400 prior to the start of the race; with the explication that his Dodge was illegal. Fred Lorenzen was allowed to run, even though it was determined that some of the aerodynamic enhancements made to his Junior Johnson Ford were not approved. NASCAR Bill France admitted that the "rules were bent" in order to lure Ford back to competition. Petty won the event over second-place finisher Buddy Baker, with Wendell Scott taking the seventh-place finish and the highest for the Ford drivers in the 400-mile (640 km) event at the 1.5-mile (2.4 km) paved venue in Atlanta. Pearson returned to the track, and victory lane for the twelfth time in 1966 at the next event on August 18 at Columbia; an event that witnessed driver Curtis Turner finish third while wearing a three-piece business suit as a promotion for his sponsor Holly Farms. Turner said they: "wanted me to wear a suit, but they didn't specify what kind. So I wore my best." Darel Dieringer won the next event at Weaverville in his 1966 Mercury, followed by another win by Allison at Beltsville. Pearson got another victory to finish off the month of August at Winston-Salem.

The first event of September was held at Darlington, and Darel Dieringer roped in the victory in his 1966 Mercury. Pearson gathered up another two wins at Hickory and Richmond in the following events, followed by Hutcherson's win at Hillsboro on the 18th. The last September event was held at Martinsville, and the record books show that Lorenzen won the event. The Martinsville race was noteworthy in its final outcome, due to a controversy once again. Originally Lorenzen was declared the winner; but, he was disqualified for having a fuel tank larger than the rules permitted. Three days after the event, NASCAR restored Lorenzen's victory with the justification that the fuel tank was purchased from Firestone, and thus within the spirit of the rules.

The final three events of the 1966 NASCAR season held in October were won by Dick Hutcherson, LeeRoy Yarbrough, and Fred Lorenzen winning the season finale. Hutcherson won at North Wilkesboro, Yarbrough at Charlotte, and Lorenzen took the final victory at Rockingham. The 500-mile (800 km) Rockingham event was filled with popular drivers, and proved to be the final race for 2 legends of the sport. Both Ned Jarrett, and Junior Johnson made their final appearances as drivers at the event. Jarrett finished third, and Johnson came home in a respectful fifth-place finish on October 30, 1966.

== Season statistics ==
Finish	Driver	Races	Wins	Poles	Top 5	Top 10	Laps Led	Points	Earnings
1	David Pearson	42	15	7	26	33	3174	35638	$78,194
2	James Hylton (Rookie OTY)	41	0	1	20	32	155	33688	$38,722
3	Richard Petty	39	8	15	20	22	2924	22952	$94,666
4	Henley Gray	45	0	0	4	18	0	22468	$21,901
5	Paul Goldsmith	21	3	1	11	11	452	22078	$54,609
6	Wendell Scott	45	0	0	3	17	0	21702	$23,052
7	John Sears	46	0	0	11	30	74	21432	$25,191
8	J. T. Putney	39	0	0	4	9	32	21208	$18,653
9	Neil Castles	41	0	0	7	17	0	20446	$19,034
10	Bobby Allison	33	3	4	10	15	714	19910	$23,419
11	Elmo Langley	47	2	1	12	20	308	19116	$22,455
12	Darel Dieringer	25	3	0	7	9	515	18214	$52,529
13	Ned Jarrett	21	0	0	5	8	167	17616	$23,254
14	Jim Paschal	18	2	2	6	10	759	16404	$30,984
15	Sam McQuagg	16	1	0	4	7	175	16068	$29,529
16	Paul Lewis	21	1	0	9	14	67	15352	$17,826
17	Marvin Panch	14	1	0	4	6	183	15308	$38,431
18	Cale Yarborough	14	0	0	3	7	252	15188	$28,130
19	G. C. Spencer	20	0	0	6	9	2	15028	$26,721
20	Clyde Lynn	40	0	0	1	15	0	14856	$13,221
21	Buck Baker	36	0	0	7	14	0	14504	$14,900
22	Buddy Baker	41	0	1	1	7	142	14302	$21,335
23	Fred Lorenzen	11	2	2	6	6	782	12454	$37,305
24	Curtis Turner	21	0	2	5	6	385	12266	$16,920
25	Roy Mayne	18	0	0	1	5	0	11074	$10,390

== See also ==
- 1966 American 500
- 1966 Daytona 500
- 1966 Myers Brothers 250
- 1966 Nashville 400
- 1966 Smoky Mountain 200
- 1966 Southern 500
