= Scott Racing =

NASCAR racing team

Scott Racing was a NASCAR Winston Cup Series and Atlantic Championship race team that ran from 1961 to 1973. It was primarily driven by owner Wendell Scott, but Earl Brooks also drove in 33 races and Clyde Prickett drove in one race. The team started 499 races with 1 win, 21 top 5s, and 155 top 10s.
