= 1963 Speedorama 200 =

Auto race held at Rambi Raceway in 1963

Race details
- Race 30 of 55 in the 1963 NASCAR Grand National Series season
- Rambi Raceway
- Date: July 7, 1963; 61 years ago
- Official name: Speedorama 200
- Location: Rambi Raceway, Myrtle Beach, South Carolina
- Course: Permanent racing facility
- Course length: 0.804 km (0.500 miles)
- Distance: 200 laps, 100 mi (160 km)
- Weather: Very hot with temperatures of 82.0 °F (27.8 °C); wind speeds of 8 miles per hour (13 km/h)
- Average speed: 60.996 miles per hour (98.164 km/h)
- Attendance: 4,000

Pole position
Driver	Richard Petty	Petty Enterprises
- Time: 26.2 seconds

Most laps led
Driver	Ned Jarrett	Charles Robinson
- Laps: 140

Winner
No. 11	Ned Jarrett	Charles Robinson

Television in the United States
- Network: untelevised
- Announcers: none

The 1963 Speedorama 200 was a NASCAR Grand National Series event that was held on July 7, 1963, at Rambi Raceway in Myrtle Beach, South Carolina.

Chuck Huckabee's NASCAR Cup debut nets him his lone top-10 finish in ninth place. He wouldn't finish higher than 12th in any of his other 11 Cup starts.

== Race report ==
Two hundred laps were done on a dirt track spanning 0.500 miles (0.805 km) for a grand total of 100 miles (160 km) of racing action. The entire race lasted one hour and thirty-eight seconds with four thousand people watching Ned Jarrett defeat Buck Baker by more than seven laps. This was the first race competed in by J. D. McDuffie (who drove in a self-sponsored 1961 Ford Galaxie).

The transition to purpose-built racecars began in the early 1960s and occurred gradually over that decade. Changes made to the sport by the late 1960s brought an end to the "strictly stock" vehicles of the 1950s.

The average speed of the race was 60.996 miles per hour (98.164 km/h) while Richard Petty would be the fastest driver in qualifying with a speed of 68.700 miles per hour (110.562 km/h). There were no records kept of any cautions committed in this race. Despite McDuffie's later problems, he would finish in 12th place in this race. Bobby Isaac would lead 30 laps before an engine problem would force him to finish in last place. Cale Yarborough would receive his first top-5 finish of his career at this race.

Notable crew chiefs at this race were Herman Beam and Crawford Clements.

The winner would receive $1,000 in winnings ($10,271 in current US dollars) while the last-place finisher would receive a meager $100 for his "hard work" ($1,027 in current US dollars). The total winnings of the race would add up to $4,540 ($46,629 in current US dollars).

=== Qualifying ===
Grid	No.	Driver	Manufacturer	Owner
1	41	Richard Petty	'63 Plymouth	Petty Enterprises
2	99	Bobby Isaac	'63 Ford	Bondy Long
3	11	Ned Jarrett	'63 Ford	Charles Robinson
4	54	Jimmy Pardue	'63 Ford	Pete Stewart
5	93	Jim Reitzel	'63 Ford	Lee Reitzel
6	19	Cale Yarborough	'62 Ford	Herman Beam
7	2	Joe Weatherly	'62 Pontiac	Cliff Stewart
8	87	Buck Baker	'63 Pontiac	Buck Baker
9	34	Wendell Scott	'62 Chevrolet	Wendell Scott
10	86	Neil Castles	'62 Chrysler	Buck Baker
11	09	Larry Manning	'62 Chevrolet	Bob Adams
12	61	Mark Hurley	'63 Ford	Mark Hurley
13	18	Stick Elliott	'62 Pontiac	Toy Bolton
14	X	J.D. McDuffie	'61 Ford	J.D. McDuffie
15	96	Jimmy Massey	'61 Chevrolet	Hubert Westmoreland
16	88	Curtis Crider	'61 Chrysler	Buck Baker
17	68	Ed Livingston	'61 Ford	Ed Livingston
18	62	Chuck Huckabee	'62 Mercury	Curtis Crider

== Timeline ==
Section reference:

- Start of race: Bobby Isaac quickly took over the lead from pole position winner Richard Petty.
- Lap 30: Bobby Isaac's vehicle had an engine failure, forcing him out of the race.
- Lap 31: Richard Petty took back the lead from Bobby Isaac.
- Lap 46: Wendell Scott's engine became problematic, causing him to leave the race.
- Lap 60: Richard Petty was involved in a terminal crash, ending his weekend on the track.
- Lap 61: Ned Jarrett took over the lead from Richard Petty.
- Lap 94: Lee Reitzel had his vehicle's engine become problematic, ending his day on the track.
- Lap 119: Jimmy Pardue became the final DNF of the day due to engine problems.
- Finish: Ned Jarrett won the race

== Finishing order ==
Section reference:

1. Ned Jarrett (No. 11)
2. Buck Baker (No. 87)
3. Joe Weatherly (No. 2)
4. Neil Castles (No. 86)
5. Cale Yarborough (No. 19)
6. Larry Manning (No. 09)
7. Jimmy Massey (No. 96)
8. Curtis Crider (No. 88)
9. Chuck Huckabee (No. 62)
10. Stick Elliott (No. 18)
11. Jimmy Pardue* (No. 54)
12. J. D. McDuffie (No. X)
13. Ed Livingston (No. 68)
14. Lee Reitzel* (No. 93)
15. Richard Petty* (No. 41)
16. Wendell Scott* (No. 34)
17. Mark Hurley* (No. 61)
18. Bobby Isaac* (No. 99)

* DNF
