= 1964 Jacksonville 200 =

Auto race held at Speedway Park in 1964

Race details
- Race 3 of 62 in the 1964 NASCAR Grand National Series season
- Date: December 1, 1963
- Official name: 1964 Jacksonville 200
- Location: Speedway Park in Jacksonville, Florida
- Course: Dirt oval
- Course length: 0.500 miles (0.805 km)
- Distance: 202 laps, 101 mi (162.544 km)
- Scheduled distance: 200 laps, 100 mi (160.934 km)
- Weather: Temperatures ranging between 37.9 °F (3.3 °C) and 54.0 °F (12.2 °C); average wind speeds of 7.48 miles per hour (12.04 km/h)
- Average speed: 58.252 mph (93.748 km/h)

Pole position
Driver	Jack Smith	Archie Smith
- Time: 25.38

Most laps led
Driver	Richard Petty	Petty Enterprises
- Laps: 103

Winner
No. 34	Wendell Scott	Scott Racing

The 1964 Jacksonville 200 (Note: The race has also been called the "Turkey Day 200" in some sources.) was the third race of the 1964 NASCAR Grand National Series calendar, held on December 1, 1963. It was won by the first African-American driver ever to win a NASCAR top tier race, Wendell Scott.

== Background ==
Speedway Park was a 0.5-mile (0.80 km) dirt oval auto racing track, located in Jacksonville, Florida at the intersection of Lenox Avenue and Plymouth Street. It operated between 1945 and 1969, and would be renamed Jacksonville Speedway in early 1964, months after this race. The track permanently closed in August 1969 after significant concerns were raised about its safety features.

NASCAR Grand National Series races were held at this track during the 1951, 1952, 1954, 1955, 1961 and 1964 seasons.

== Summary ==
Jack Smith started from the pole position. Ned Jarrett drove to a substantial lead early in the event, but a damaged wheel hub caused him to fall 20 laps behind while it was repaired. Richard Petty led the most laps, 103, before having his steering break due to the rough track conditions. Scott, driving a car formerly owned by Jarrett, took the lead with 25 laps remaining, and led to the scheduled finish of the event; however, after 200 laps, the checkered flag was not waved.

Two laps later, second-place finisher Buck Baker took the checkered flag and was declared the winner. Scott protested the results; two hours later, following a review of the scoring, Scott was declared the winner by two laps. Some, including Scott's family, stated that the victory was awarded to Baker, with the results being altered after the crowd had left the speedway, due to racism; others, including two-time NASCAR champion Ned Jarrett, believe it was simply a scoring error, which was very common in the pre-electronic scoring system. Four weeks later at Savannah Speedway, Scott was given his first-place prize check and a replica trophy; the genuine trophy has never resurfaced, however in October 2010 the Jacksonville Stock Car Racing Hall of Fame gave a more accurate replica trophy to Scott's family. It was not until 2013 that another African American driver won a NASCAR national touring series race, when Bubba Wallace won the 2013 Kroger 200 at Martinsville Speedway.

Larry Thomas had a hard crash in this race, ending up upside down afterward. He would lose $4000 getting into the race and earning only $60; which wasn't even enough to buy a set of fresh racing tires during the mid-1960s. The independent drivers were not able to afford $4000 a race and the factory teams were also unable to spend that kind of money in 1963. Back in the 1960s, a working man could comfortably live by himself simply by working a job that paid him at least $100 a week. Spending $4000 to race in a NASCAR race in 1964 would have been the equivalent to 3 years' pay for an average blue-collar worker.

This is the only race Wendell Scott ever finished on the lead lap in his entire career. Buck Baker was originally flagged the winner, but scoring re-checked revealed Wendell Scott was not scored for 4 laps in the race.

Maurice Petty failed to qualify for the race.

Notable crew chiefs for the race were Jimmy Helms, Dale Inman, Wendell Scott, and Ralph Gray.

The transition to purpose-built race cars began in the early 1960s and occurred gradually over that decade. Changes made to the sport by the late 1960s brought an end to the "strictly stock" vehicles of the 1950s.

=== Stats ===
The race officially lasted a duration of one hour and forty-three minutes. The average speed was 58.252 miles per hour (93.748 km/h). Jack Smith won the pole at 70.921 miles per hour (114.136 km/h). The margin of victory was over two laps after the correction of the scoring error, resulting in an addition of two laps to the race. Five thousand people attended the race.

== Results ==
Pos	Grid	No.	Driver	Manufacturer	Laps	Status	Led
1	15	34	Wendell Scott	Chevrolet	202	Running	27
2	14	87	Buck Baker	Pontiac	200	Running	0
3	1	47	Jack Smith	Plymouth	199	Running	20
4	18	68	Ed Livingston	Ford	195	Running	0
5	2	42	Richard Petty	Plymouth	193	Running	103
6	17	86	Neil Castles	Chrysler	190	Running	0
7	5	11	Ned Jarrett	Ford	183	Wheel bolts	52
8	20	78	Buddy Arrington #	Dodge	182	Running	0
9	19	92	Johnny Allen	Ford	179	Running	0
10	4	5	Billy Wade	Dodge	163	Differential	0
11	21	05	Possum Jones	Pontiac	156	Running	0
12	10	32	Tiny Lund	Ford	124	Differential	0
13	7	20	Jack Anderson	Ford	121	Radiator	0
14	22	61	Joe Weatherly	Ford	120	Running	0
15	16	9	Roy Tyner	Chevrolet	99	Axle	0
16	9	6	David Pearson	Dodge	70	Oil pan	0
17	6	03	G. C. Spencer	Chevrolet	60	Differential	0
18	13	36	Larry Thomas	Dodge	60	Accident	0
19	3	90	Jimmy Lee Capps	Plymouth	50	Accident	0
20	11	39	LeeRoy Yarbrough	Pontiac	23	Axle	0
21	12	62	Curtis Crider	Ford	8	Engine	0
22	8	2	Jimmy Pardue	Pontiac	6	Axle	0
# Rookie of the Year candidate

Previous race: 1964 The First 510	Grand National Series; 1964 season	Next race: 1964 Sunshine 200
