= Talladega 500 =

The Talladega Superspeedway hosts two 500-mile races in the NASCAR Cup Series calendar, both generically referred as "Talladega 500".

- The spring race, currently known as Jack Link's 500
- The fall race, currently known as YellaWood 500
