= Beltsville Speedway =

Former NASCAR race track

Beltsville Speedway Baltimore-Washington Speedway
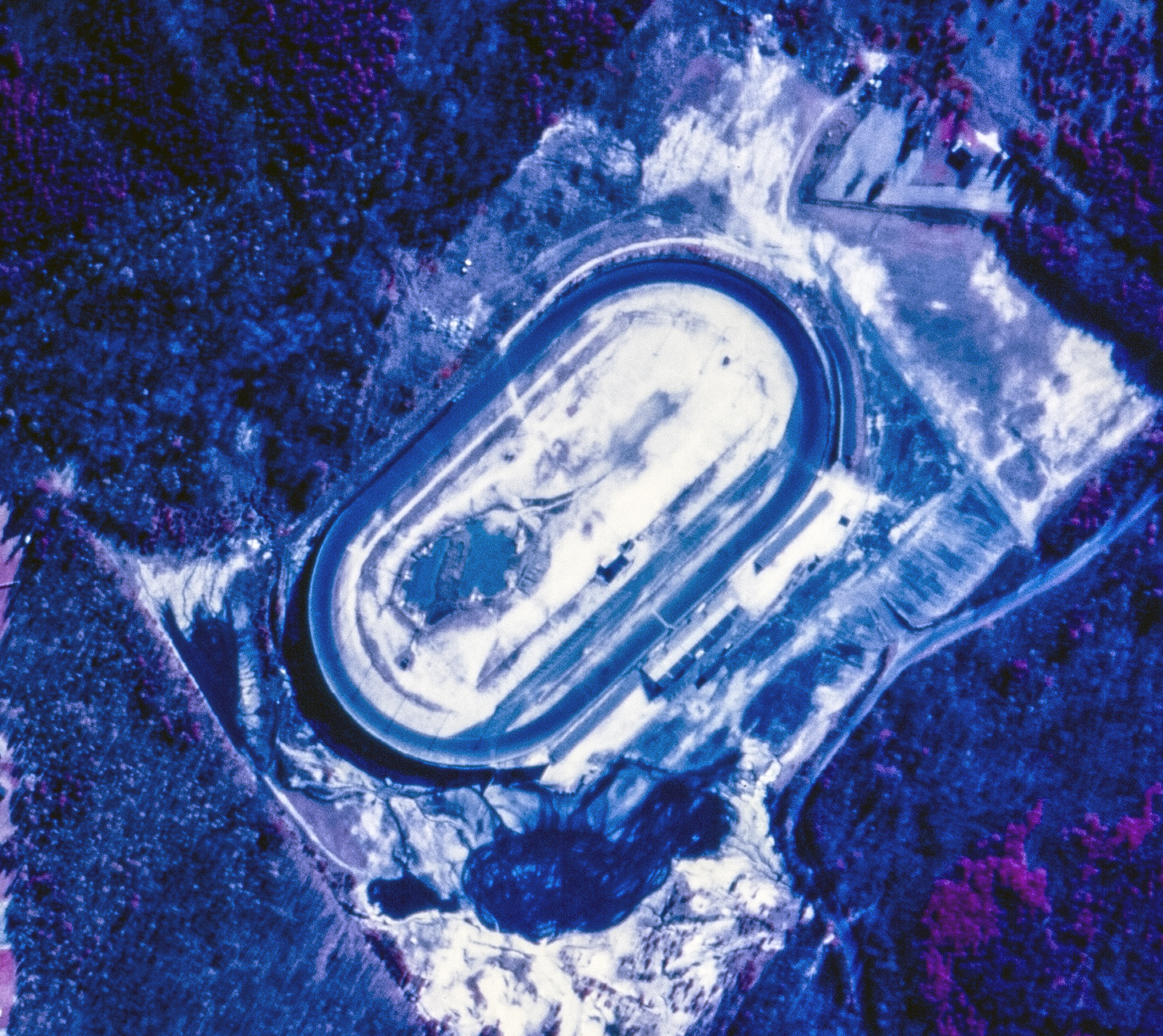
- Aerial photograph of Beltsville Speedway (1972)
- Location: 9200 Powder Mill Road Laurel, Maryland 20708
- Coordinates: 39.04°N 76.84°W
- Capacity: ~7,000
- Broke ground: 1964
- Opened: 1965
- Closed: 1978
- Major events: None (defunct)

Pavement oval track
- Length: 0.500 mi (0.805 km)

The Beltsville Speedway, formerly the Baltimore-Washington Speedway was an asphalt oval track in Prince George's County, Maryland; it spanned 0.500 miles (0.805 km).

Near Beltsville, it was on land now occupied by Capitol Technology University, in the South Laurel census-designated place.

== Summary ==
The track was specially designed with banked turns for stock car racing. Originally known as the "Baltimore-Washington Speedway", the track received its final name in its 19th month of operation. The track hosted modified stock car racing vehicles alongside the other NASCAR series. Wednesday nights were the original night for racing but the schedule eventually added Friday night racing. Ten Grand National races were raced there including the popular Beltsville 300 series of races. Strict noise restrictions were given out in its final year of operation and the county started monitoring the events. Eventually, a sound wall was built surrounding the speedways. Cars had to begin running mufflers in order to stifle the noise from the increasing RPMs from the vehicles themselves. The track was eventually shut down, demolished, and replaced with a local university.

Famous race car drivers like Richard Petty, Tiny Lund, and David Pearson participated in legendary races there. The 1968 Beltsville 300 was an example of some of the classic NASCAR Grand National races that were run on the track.

== NASCAR Grand National Results ==
Date	Winner
August 25, 1965	Ned Jarrett
June 15, 1966	Tiny Lund
August 24, 1966	Bobby Allison
May 19, 1967	Jim Paschal
September 15, 1967	Richard Petty
May 17, 1968	David Pearson
September 13, 1968	Bobby Isaac
May 16, 1969	Bobby Isaac
July 15, 1969	Richard Petty
May 15, 1970	Bobby Isaac
