= Smoky Mountain Speedway =

Motorsport track in Maryville, Tennessee

- Location: Maryville, Tennessee
- Coordinates: 35.639°N 84.103°W
- Opened: 1962
- Former names: Smoky Mountain Raceway
- Surface: dirt
- Length: 0.375 mi (0.604 km)
- Turns: 4

Smoky Mountain Speedway is a 0.375 mi (0.604 km) dirt track located in Maryville, Tennessee.

== History ==
Smoky Mountain Speedway (known back then as Smokey Mountain Raceway) was built in 1962 and opened during the 1965 racing season. The track was converted into an asphalt track in 1967 only to revert back to a dirt track in 1978. On November 2, 2022, it was announced that the track would be shortened to 0.375 mi (0.604 km) in 2023.

== Racing events ==
The track hosts regional and national dirt track events for several sanctioning bodies. The track was used for a NASCAR Grand National Series race with its first one in 1965 and its last one was held in 1971.
