= Rene Charland =

American modified stock car racing driver

- Born: November 13, 1928 Chicopee, Massachusetts, U.S.
- Died: September 30, 2013 (aged 84) Amsterdam, New York, U.S.
- Retired: 1984

Motorsports career
- Debut season: 1949
- Car number: 3, 59, 99, 888
- Championships: 13
- Wins: 700+

Championship titles
- 1962, 1963, 1964, 1965 NASCAR National Sportsman Champion

NASCAR Cup Series career
- 9 races run over 4 years
- Best finish: 77th (1966)
- First race: 1964 Race No. 1 (Islip)
- Last race: 1971 Albany-Saratoga 250 (Malta)
| Wins | Top tens | Poles |
|---|---|---|
| 0 | 1 | 0 |

Rene Charland (November 13, 1928 – September 30, 2013), nicknamed "the Champ", was an American stock car racing driver. He was a four-time champion of the NASCAR National Sportsman Division, now known as the O'Reilly Auto Parts Series.

== Racing Career ==
=== Early Career ===
Charland was born in Chicopee, Massachusetts on November 13, 1928 and made his home in Agawam. His racing career began in 1949 at Riverside Park Speedway in Massachusetts. He was part of a group of Northeastern racers called "the Eastern Bandits" who dominated the asphalt tracks of New England before moving over to the New York tracks in the 1950s and to the Mid-Atlantic and South to compete in NASCAR competition.

=== Championship Years ===
In 1962, Charland won his first championship in the NASCAR National Sportsman Division, now the NASCAR O'Reilly Auto Parts Series, which came with $666.00 in prize money. He won the title again the following three years, and finished third in the series' 1966 standings despite missing half of the season due to an injury suffered at Albany-Saratoga Speedway. His run of four straight championships gave Charland the nickname "the Champ", a name he became better known by than his given name, which was pronounced "REE-nee".

Charland also competed in the NASCAR Grand National Series, running nine races between 1964 and 1971, including the 1966 Daytona 500, posting a best career finish of third at Fonda Speedway in 1966.

Charland was estimated as having won over 700 races during his career. He claimed his last track championship at Fonda Speedway in 1970, despite changing rides when his car owner refused to compete at certain venues.

Charland was an inductee into the New England Antique Racers Hall of Fame, the New York State Stock Car Association Hall of Fame and the Northeast Dirt Modified Hall of Fame. In his later years Charland suffered from dementia, and died on September 30, 2013, in a nursing home in Amsterdam, New York.

== Motorsports career results ==
=== NASCAR ===
(key) (Bold – Pole position awarded by qualifying time. Italics – Pole position earned by points standings or practice time. * – Most laps led.)

==== Grand National Series ====
NASCAR Grand National Series results
| Year | Team | No. | Make | 1 | 2 | 3 | 4 | 5 | 6 | 7 | 8 | 9 | 10 | 11 | 12 | 13 | 14 | 15 | 16 | 17 | 18 | 19 | 20 | 21 | 22 | 23 | 24 | 25 | 26 | 27 | 28 | 29 | 30 | 31 | 32 | 33 | 34 | 35 | 36 | 37 | 38 | 39 | 40 | 41 | 42 | 43 | 44 | 45 | 46 | 47 | 48 | 49 | 50 | 51 | 52 | 53 | 54 | 55 | 56 | 57 | 58 | 59 | 60 | 61 | 62 | NGNC | Pts | Ref |
|---|---|---|---|---|---|---|---|---|---|---|---|---|---|---|---|---|---|---|---|---|---|---|---|---|---|---|---|---|---|---|---|---|---|---|---|---|---|---|---|---|---|---|---|---|---|---|---|---|---|---|---|---|---|---|---|---|---|---|---|---|---|---|---|---|---|---|---|---|
| 1964 | Bernard Alvarez | 10 | Ford | CON | AUG | JSP | SVH | RSD | DAY | DAY | DAY | RCH | BRI | GPS | BGS | ATL | AWS | HBO | PIF | CLB | NWS | MAR | SVH | DAR | LGY | HCY | SBO | CLT | GPS | ASH | ATL | CON | NSV | CHT | BIR | VAL | PIF | DAY | ODS | OBS | BRR | ISP; 16 | GLN | LIN | BRI | NSV | MBS | AWS | DTS | ONA | CLB | BGS | STR | DAR | HCY | RCH | ODS | HBO | MAR | SVH | NWS | CLT | HAR | AUG | JAC | 119th | 160 | |
| 1965 | Julian Buesink | 03 | Ford | RSD | DAY | DAY | DAY; DNQ | PIF | ASW | RCH | HBO | ATL | GPS | NWS | MAR | CLB | BRI | DAR | LGY | BGS | HCY | CLT | CCF | ASH | HAR | NSV | BIR | ATL | GPS | MBS | VAL | DAY | ODS | OBS | ISP | GLN | BRI | NSV | CCF | AWS | SMR | PIF | AUG | CLB | DTS | BLV | BGS | DAR | HCY | LIN | ODS | RCH | MAR | NWS | | | | | | | | | | | | 108th | 192 | |
| 1965 | Gary Weaver | 10 | Ford | | | | | | | | | | | | | | | | | | | | | | | | | | | | | | | | | | | | | | | | | | | | | | | | | | | | CLT; 38 | HBO | | | | | | | | | | 108th | 192 | |
| 1965 | Herman Beam | 1 | Ford | | | | | | | | | | | | | | | | | | | | | | | | | | | | | | | | | | | | | | | | | | | | | | | | | | | | | | CAR; 39 | DTS | | | | | | | | 108th | 192 | |
| 1966 | Ed Ackerman | 03 | Ford | AUG | RSD | DAY | DAY; 33 | DAY; 50 | CAR | BRI | ATL | HCY | CLB | GPS | BGS | NWS | MAR | DAR | LGY | MGR | MON | RCH | CLT | DTS | ASH | PIF | SMR | AWS | BLV | GPS | DAY | ODS | BRR | OXF; 15 | FON; 3 | ISP; 24 | BRI | SMR | NSV | ATL | CLB | AWS | BLV | BGS | DAR | HCY | RCH | HBO | MAR | NWS | CLT | CAR | | | | | | | | | | | | | | 77th | 794 | |
| 1971 | John Keselowski | 62 | Dodge | RSD | DAY | DAY | DAY | ONT | RCH | CAR | HCY | BRI | ATL | CLB | GPS | SMR | NWS | MAR | DAR | SBO | TAL | ASH | KPT | CLT | DOV | MCH | RSD | HOU | GPS | DAY | BRI | AST; 31 | ISP | TRN | NSV | ATL | BGS | ONA | MCH | TAL | CLB | HCY | DAR | MAR | CLT | DOV | CAR | MGR | RCH | NWS | TWS | | | | | | | | | | | | | | | NA | - | |
