= Sonny Hutchins =

American racing driver (1929–2005)

- Born: May 17, 1929; Richmond, Virginia, US
- Died: November 21, 2005 (aged 76)

NASCAR Cup Series career
- 38 races run over 9 years
- Best finish: 34th (1967)
- First race: 1955 Richmond 200 (Richmond)
- Last race: 1974 Old Dominion 500 (Martinsville)
Wins	Top tens	Poles
0	7	0

Ernest Lloyd "Sonny" Hutchins (May 17, 1929 – November 21, 2005) was a stock car driver who raced in NASCAR's Grand National/Winston Cup Series from 1955 to 1974. He died in 2005.

== Motorsports career results ==
=== NASCAR ===
(key) (Bold – Pole position awarded by qualifying time. Italics – Pole position earned by points standings or practice time. * – Most laps led.)

==== Grand National Series ====
NASCAR Grand National Series results
Year	Team	No.	Make	1	2	3	4	5	6	7	8	9	10	11	12	13	14	15	16	17	18	19	20	21	22	23	24	25	26	27	28	29	30	31	32	33	34	35	36	37	38	39	40	41	42	43	44	45	46	47	48	49	50	51	52	53	54	55	NGNC	Pts	Ref
1955	J.M. Fitzgibbons	97-A	Chevy	TCS	PBS	JSP	DAB	OSP	CLB	HBO	NWS	MGY	LAN	CLT	HCY	ASF	TUS	MAR	RCH; 5	NCF	FOR	LIN	MCF	FON	AIR	CLT	PIF	CLB	AWS	MOR	ALS	NYF	SAN	CLT	FOR	MAS	RSP	DAR	MGY	LAN	RSP	GPS	MAS	CLB	MAR	LVP	NWS	HBO											242nd	-	
1965	Donlavey Racing	90	Ford	RSD	DAY	DAY	DAY	PIF	AWS	RCH; 19	HBO	ATL	GPS	NWS	MAR; 25	CLB	BRI	DAR; 21	LGY	BGS	HCY	CLT; 21	CCF	ASH	HAR	NSV	BIR	ATL	GPS	MBS	VAL	DAY	ODS; 12	OBS	ISP	GLN	BRI	NSV	CCF	AWS	SMR	PIF	AUG	CLB	DTS; 5	BLV	BGS	DAR	HCY	LIN	ODS; 14	RCH; 28	MAR; 10	NWS	CLT; 41	HBO	CAR	DTS	50th	3118	
1966	Donlavey Racing	90	Ford	AUG	RSD	DAY	DAY; 22	DAY; 47	CAR	BRI	ATL	HCY	CLB	GPS	BGS	NWS	MAR	DAR	LGY	MGR	MON	RCH	CLT; 27	DTS	ASH	PIF	SMR	AWS	BLV; 22	GPS	DAY	ODS	BRR	OXF	FON	ISP	BRI	SMR	NSV	ATL	CLB	AWS	BLV	BGS	DAR	HCY	RCH	HBO	MAR	NWS	CLT	CAR							82nd	580	
1967	Donlavey Racing	90	Ford	AUG	RSD	DAY	DAY; 9	DAY; 7	AWS	BRI	GPS	BGS	ATL; 13	CLB	HCY	NWS	MAR; 33	SVH	RCH	DAR	BLV	LGY	CLT; 33	ASH	MGR	SMR	BIR	CAR	GPS	MGY	DAY	TRN	OXF	FDA	ISP	BRI	SMR	NSV	ATL	BGS	CLB	SVH	DAR	HCY	RCH	BLV; 29	HBO	MAR	NWS	CLT; 20	CAR	AWS							34th	8448	
1968	Donlavey Racing	90	Ford	MGR	MGY	RSD	DAY; 38	BRI	RCH	ATL	HCY	GPS	CLB	NWS	MAR; 29	AUG	AWS	DAR	BLV	LGY	CLT; 37	ASH	MGR	SMR	BIR	CAR	GPS	DAY	ISP	OXF	FDA	TRN; 29	BRI	SMR	NSV	ATL	CLB	BGS	AWS	SBO	LGY	DAR	HCY	RCH	BLV	HBO	MAR	NWS	AUG	CLT	CAR	JFC							62nd	-	
1969	Donlavey Racing	90	Ford	MGR	MGY	RSD	DAY	DAY	DAY	CAR; 41	AUG	BRI	ATL	CLB	HCY	GPS	RCH; 20	NWS	MAR; 28	AWS	DAR	BLV	LGY	CLT; 11	MGR	SMR	MCH	KPT	GPS	NCF	DAY	DOV; 2	TPN	TRN; 24	BLV	BRI	NSV	SMR	ATL	MCH	SBO	BGS	AWS	DAR	HCY	RCH; 2	TAL	CLB	MAR	NWS	CLT; 32	SVH	AUG	CAR	JFC	MGR	TWS		44th	535	
1970	Donlavey Racing	90	Ford	RSD	DAY	DAY	DAY	RCH	CAR	SVH	ATL	BRI	TAL	NWS	CLB	DAR	BLV	LGY	CLT; 26	SMR	MAR	MCH	RSD	HCY	KPT	GPS	DAY	AST	TPN	TRN	BRI	SMR	NSV	ATL	CLB	ONA	MCH	TAL	BGS	SBO	DAR	HCY	RCH; 5	DOV; DNQ	NCF	NWS	CLT	MAR; DNQ	MGR	CAR	LGY								78th	92	

==== Winston Cup Series ====
NASCAR Winston Cup Series results
Year	Team	No.	Make	1	2	3	4	5	6	7	8	9	10	11	12	13	14	15	16	17	18	19	20	21	22	23	24	25	26	27	28	29	30	NWCC	Pts	Ref
1973	Harraka Enterprises	82	Chevy	RSD	DAY	RCH; 21	CAR	BRI	ATL	NWS	DAR	MAR	TAL	NSV	CLT	DOV	TWS	RSD	MCH	DAY	BRI	ATL	TAL	NSV	DAR	RCH	DOV	NWS	MAR	CLT	CAR			112th	-	
1974	Emanuel Zervakis	01	Chevy	RSD	DAY	RCH	CAR	BRI	ATL	DAR	NWS	MAR	TAL	NSV	DOV	CLT	RSD	MCH	DAY	BRI	NSV	ATL	POC	TAL	MCH	DAR	RCH	DOV	NWS	MAR; 21	CLT	CAR	ONT	132nd	0.59	
