= 1966 Daytona 500 =

Auto race run in Florida in 1966

Race details
- Race 5 of 49 in the 1966 NASCAR Grand National Series season
- 1966 Daytona 500 program cover
- Date: February 27, 1966
- Location: Daytona International Speedway; Daytona Beach, Florida, U.S.
- Course: Permanent racing facility 2.5 mi (4.023 km)
- Distance: 198 laps, 495 mi (796.625 km)
- Scheduled distance: 200 laps, 500 mi (804.672 km)
- Weather: Temperatures reaching as high as 60.1 °F (15.6 °C); wind speeds approaching 12 miles per hour (19 km/h)
- Average speed: 160.927 miles per hour (258.987 km/h)

Pole position
Driver	Richard Petty	Petty Enterprises

Qualifying race winners
Duel 1 Winner	Paul Goldsmith	Ray Nichels
Duel 2 Winner	Earl Balmer	Ray Fox

Most laps led
Driver	Richard Petty	Petty Enterprises
- Laps: 108

Winner
No. 43 Plymouth	Richard Petty	Petty Enterprises

The 1966 Daytona 500, the 8th running of the event, was won by Richard Petty driving a 1966 Plymouth on February 27, 1966. Petty drove his number 43 to victory in just over three hours after starting the race on the pole. There were four caution flags which slowed the race for 22 laps. Petty came from two laps down to win the event after 198 laps were completed. The race was shortened by two laps due to rain. The win was Petty's second victory of the season.

== 1966 season ==
The 1966 season marked the return of the Chrysler Hemi engine in NASCAR competition, while Ford took a one-year leave from competition before realizing that the ploy was detrimental to their sales. The 1966 Daytona 500 was the fifth event of 49 in the 1966 season, which included the two qualifying races for the 500. The 1966 season opened in Augusta with Petty taking the win in the season inaugural event. Dan Gurney followed with a win in Riverside before the drivers and their teams ventured to Daytona International Speedway for the 500-mile (800 km) event. NASCAR ran a total of 49 events, ending at the Rockingham Speedway in October. David Pearson won the NASCAR Grand National Series Championship after winning 15 events while 168 drivers competed in at least one event during the 1966 season.

== Background ==
=== Qualifying ===
Richard Petty captured the pole position for the event with a speed of 175.165 miles per hour (281.901 km/h). The two 100-mile qualifying events were won by Paul Goldsmith and Earl Balmer. A total of 50 drivers started the Daytona 500 in 1966.

Qualifying race results

First qualifier

1. #99 – Paul Goldsmith
2. #43 – Richard Petty
3. #7 – Don White
4. #21 – Marvin Panch
5. #28 – Fred Lorenzen
6. #98 – Sam McQuagg
7. #71 – Gordon Johncock
8. #16 – Darel Dieringer
9. #9 – Larry Frank
10. #27 – Cale Yarborough

Second qualifier

1. #3 – Earl Balmer
2. #56 – Jim Hurtubise
3. #29 – Dick Hutcherson
4. #12 – LeeRoy Yarbrough
5. #11 – Ned Jarrett
6. #6 – David Pearson
7. #26 – Bobby Isaac
8. #14 – Jim Paschal
9. #49 – G.C. Spencer
10. #79 – Frank Warren

== The Race ==
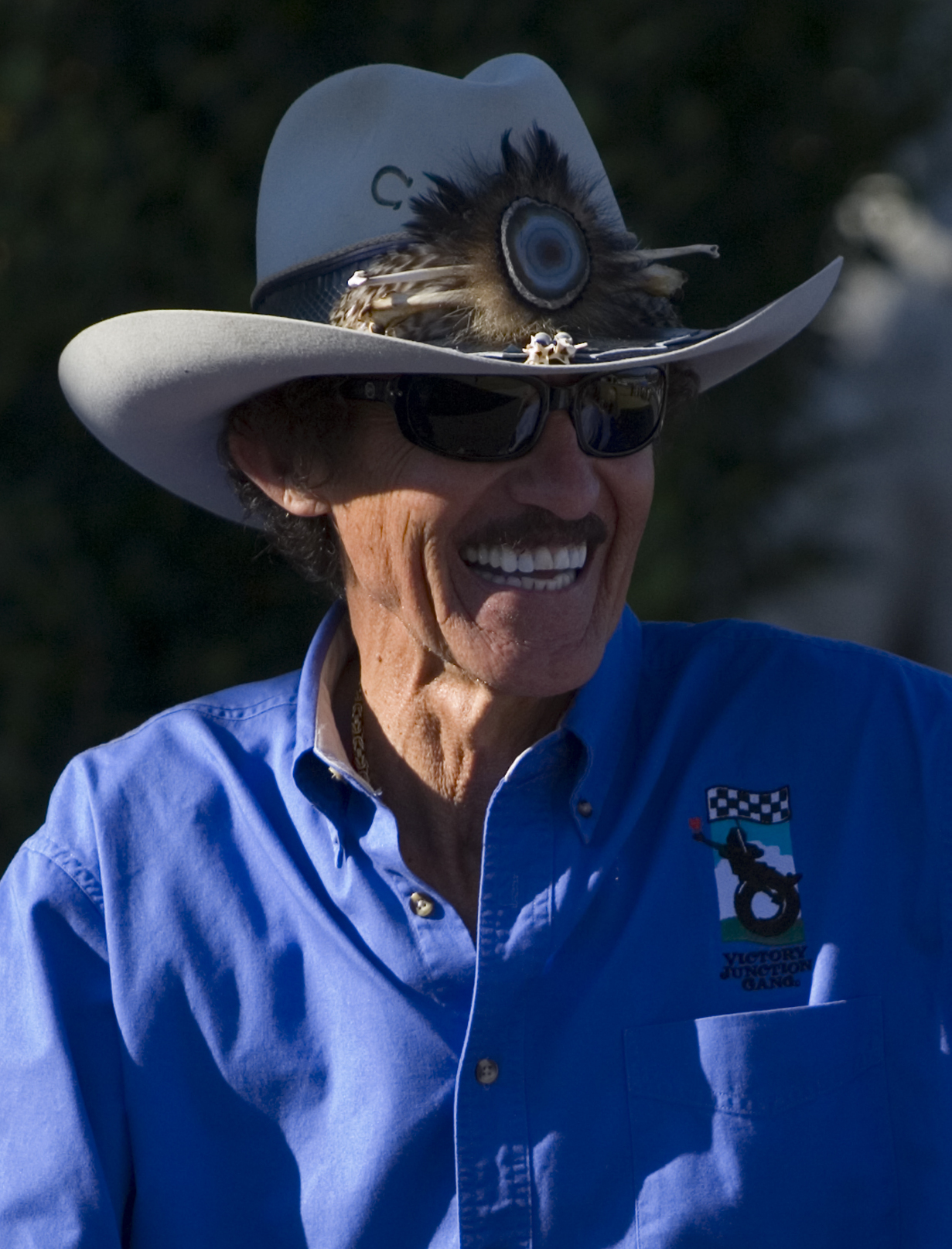
Richard Petty, winner of the 1966 Daytona 500

After starting on the pole, Petty led the first six laps of the event, before relinquishing the lead to Paul Goldsmith, who had started in the third position. Petty and Goldsmith swapped the lead four times before Dick Hutcherson drove his 1966 Ford into the lead on lap 34.

Petty suffered from tire problems early in the race, yet work by his pit crew, and having one of the fastest cars allowed him to work his way back to the front of the field. In 2008 Petty said: "...we was the quickest car all week long. That car, again, like the '64 car, was just a real fast car, and we just outrun everybody." Petty returned to the lead on lap 97 when he overtook Goldsmith. A total of six drivers exchanged the lead 15 times throughout the event, with Petty, Goldsmith, Hutcherson, Cale Yarborough, Marvin Panch, Jim Hurtubise all leading at least one lap. On lap 113, Petty took the lead for the final time, and went on to finish more than a full lap ahead of second-place finisher Yarborough. Petty led a race-high 108 laps.

The victory by Petty was his second Daytona 500 victory, having won the event in 1964. Richard Petty's victory at the 1966 Daytona 500 was the first and only time that he captured the pole position, despite winning the event a record seven times. As of 2026, Richard Petty is the only driver to win the event seven times: 1964, 1966, 1971, 1973, 1974, 1979, and 1981. The 1966 Daytona 500 was the first time that a driver won the event for a second time.

== Race results ==
Pos	Grid	No.	Driver	Entrant	Manufacturer	Laps	Winnings	Laps led	Time/Status
1	1	43	Richard Petty	Petty Enterprises	1966 Plymouth	198	$28,150	108	3:04:54
2	19	27	Cale Yarborough	Banjo Matthews	1966 Ford	197	$12,800	33	+1 Lap
3	12	6	David Pearson	Cotton Owens	1966 Dodge	196	$7,950	0	+2 Laps
4	9	28	Fred Lorenzen	Holman-Moody	1966 Ford	196	$4,250	0	+2 Laps
5	11	98	Sam McQuagg	Ray Nichels	1966 Dodge	195	$3,600	0	+3 Laps
6	6	56	Jim Hurtubise	Norm Nelson	1966 Plymouth	195	$2,700	4	+3 Laps
7	10	11	Ned Jarrett	Bondy Long	1966 Ford	195	$2,100	0	+3 Laps
8	8	12	LeeRoy Yarbrough	Jon Thorne	1966 Dodge	193	$1,750	0	+5 Laps
9	23	48	James Hylton	Bud Hartje	1965 Dodge	193	$1,500	0	+5 Laps
10	17	9	Larry Frank	Ray Nichels	1966 Plymouth	192	$1,425	0	+6 Laps
11	16	14	Jim Paschal	Tom Friedkin	1966 Plymouth	192	$1,350	0	+6 Laps
12	15	16	Darel Dieringer	Bud Moore Engineering	1966 Mercury	192	$1,275	0	+6 Laps
13	28	34	Wendell Scott	Wendell Scott	1965 Ford	184	$1,250	0	+14 Laps
14	37	19	J. T. Putney	J. T. Putney	1965 Chevrolet	184	$1,225	0	+14 Laps
15	43	25	Jabe Thomas	Jeff Handy	1964 Ford	182	$1,200	0	+16 Laps
16	20	79	Frank Warren	Harold Rhodes	1964 Chevrolet	177	$1,170	0	+21 Laps
17	31	97	Henley Gray	Henley Gray	1966 Ford	172	$1,165	0	+26 Laps
18	3	99	Paul Goldsmith	Ray Nichels	1966 Plymouth	153	$2,060	43	+45 Laps
19	33	38	Wayne Smith	Archie Smith	1966 Chevrolet	148	$1,155	0	Fuel line
20	44	24	Bobby Allison	Betty Lilly	1965 Ford	143	$1,150	0	Engine
21	14	26	Bobby Isaac	Junior Johnson & Associates	1966 Ford	141	$1,145	0	Crash
22	32	87	Buck Baker	Buck Baker	1966 Oldsmobile	136	$1,140	0	Ignition
23	45	0	Johnny Allen	Reid Shaw	1964 Ford	132	$1,135	0	Overheating
24	18	49	G. C. Spencer	G. C. Spencer	1965 Plymouth	129	$1,130	0	Engine
25	21	41	Curtis Turner	Wood Brothers Racing	1966 Ford	122	$1,125	0	Windshield
26	7	21	Marvin Panch	Wood Brothers Racing	1966 Ford	119	$1,820	8	Windshield
27	5	07	Don White	Ray Nichels	1965 Dodge	115	$1,115	0	Ignition
28	42	33	Johnny Rutherford	Curtis Satterfield	1966 Chevrolet	115	$1,110	0	Crash
29	13	71	Gordon Johncock	Nord Krauskopf	1965 Dodge	112	$1,105	0	Engine
30	29	61	Ned Setzer	Toy Bolton	1966 Chevrolet	110	$1,100	0	Wheel
31	48	93	Blackie Watt	Harry Neal	1964 Ford	107	$1,095	0	Piston
32	36	88	Buddy Baker	Buck Baker	1965 Chevrolet	69	$1,090	0	Oil leak
33	22	47	A. J. Foyt	Junior Johnson & Associates	1966 Ford	46	$1,085	0	Head gasket
34	35	04	John Sears	L. G. DeWitt	1964 Ford	40	$1,080	0	Head gasket
35	2	29	Dick Hutcherson	Holman-Moody	1966 Ford	38	$1,075	2	Windshield
36	40	22	Bunkie Blackburn	Bob Rosenthal	1965 Chevrolet	36	$1,070	0	Engine
37	39	13	Mario Andretti	Smokey Yunick	1966 Chevrolet	31	$1,065	0	Crash
38	30	72	Bill Champion	Bill Champion	1964 Ford	29	$1,060	0	Head gasket
39	46	57	Lionel Johnson	Clay Eastridge	1964 Ford	28	$1,055	0	Engine
40	47	18	Stick Elliott	Toy Bolton	1966 Chevrolet	28	$1,050	0	Transmission
41	4	3	Earl Balmer	Ray Fox	1965 Dodge	21	$1,045	0	Engine
42	38	44	Larry Hess	Larry Hess	1964 Ford	19	$1,040	0	Engine
43	25	46	Roy Mayne	Tom Hunter	1966 Chevrolet	13	$1,035	0	Transmission
44	49	76	Ronnie Chumley	H. B. Bailey	1964 Pontiac	8	$1,030	0	Engine
45	26	64	Elmo Langley	Elmo Langley / Henry Woodfield	1965 Chevrolet	4	$1,025	0	Oil pressure
46	27	23	Calvin Kelly	Hubert Howard	1964 Ford	4	$1,020	0	Clutch
47	50	90	Sonny Hutchins	Donlavey Racing	1964 Ford	3	$1,015	0	Oil pressure
48	34	08	Bob Derrington	Bub Strickler	1964 Ford	2	$1,010	0	Clutch
49	24	36	H. B. Bailey	H. B. Bailey	1966 Pontiac	1	$1,005	0	Engine
50	41	03	Rene Charland	Ed Ackerman	1964 Ford	1	$1,000	0	Vibration
