= 1964 Firecracker 400 =

Auto race held at Daytona International Speedway in 1964

Race details
- Race 35 of 62 in the 1964 NASCAR Grand National Series season
- 1964 Firecracker 400 program cover
- Date: July 4, 1964
- Official name: Firecracker 400
- Location: Daytona International Speedway, Daytona Beach, Florida
- Course: Permanent racing facility
- Course length: 2.500 miles (4.023 km)
- Distance: 160 laps, 400 mi (643 km)
- Weather: Extremely hot with temperatures of 93 °F (34 °C); wind speeds of 12 miles per hour (19 km/h)
- Average speed: 151.451 mph (243.737 km/h)
- Attendance: 34,681

Pole position
Driver	Darel Dieringer	Bud Moore

Most laps led
Driver	Richard Petty	Petty Enterprises
- Laps: 102

Winner
No. 47	A. J. Foyt	Ray Nichels

The 1964 Firecracker 400 was a NASCAR Grand National Series event that was held on July 4, 1964, at Daytona International Speedway in Daytona Beach, Florida. It was the first NASCAR Grand National Series race to take place after Fireball Roberts died two months earlier in the infamous 1964 World 600. This race would eventually be aired on ABC's Wide World of Sports on tape-delay.

== Race report ==
There were 33 American-born drivers on the official grid. Fred Lorenzen (employed by Holman Moody) secured his last-place finish during the parade laps because he refused to start the race. Paul Goldsmith also elected not to start the race; making Doug Moore the "legitimate" last-place finisher due to a distributor issue on lap 1. Reb Wickersham spun on the first lap and very nearly took out Foyt. It took just more than two and a half hours for A. J. Foyt to defeat Bobby Isaac by a single car length in front of more than 30000 spectators. There were 19 lead changes and five caution periods for 25 laps.

Rodney Williams would make his NASCAR debut in this race. A.J. Foyt would appear in various races from the 1960s through the 1990s. His most notable future wins would come at the 1972 Daytona 500 and the 1972 Miller High Life 500. Larry Frank would carry two movie cameras in his car to record all the action being taken place. Attempts to record NASCAR history had already been attempted for the 1955 Southern 500 and the 1956 Southern 500.

For the final 56 laps, Isaac and Foyt dueled for the win, exchanging the lead 15 times between the two. Despite a blown engine African-American racer Wendell Scott brought his self-owned Ford home with a top-20. This race was run two days after President Lyndon B. Johnson signed the Civil Rights Act of 1964 into law.

Ken Spikes didn't return to racing until the 1967 Daytona 500. He was also hurt in the lap 88 wreck; going sideways on the outside of turn 4, slammed the inside wall broadside thankfully on the rightside of the car. He would probably have been killed if it had hit on the other side.

=== Top 10 finishers ===
Pos	Grid	No.	Driver	Manufacturer	Laps	Winnings	Laps led	Time/Status
1	19	47	A. J. Foyt	Dodge	160	$13,000	14	2:38:28
2	4	26	Bobby Isaac	Dodge	160	$8,895	43	+1 car length
3	9	54	Jimmy Pardue	Plymouth	160	$5,430	0	Lead lap under green flag
4	5	3	Buck Baker	Dodge	158	$3,475	0	+2 laps
5	2	41	Jim Paschal	Plymouth	158	$2,200	0	+2 laps
6	7	6	David Pearson	Dodge	158	$1,900	0	+2 laps
7	21	0	Johnny Rutherford	Ford	156	$1,350	0	+4 laps
8	8	5	Earl Balmer	Dodge	156	$1,450	1	+4 laps
9	1	16	Darel Dieringer	Mercury	153	$1,250	0	+7 laps
10	13	82	Bunkie Blackburn	Pontiac	152	$1,050	0	+8 laps

== Timeline ==
Section reference:

- Start of race: Richard Petty held the pole position as the first lap officially commenced, Paul Goldsmith and Fred Lorenzen refused to start the race.
- Lap 3: Neil Castles noticed that his vehicle's fuel pump was acting up, forcing him to accept a meager 29th-place finish.
- Lap 5: Oil pressure issues would end Rodney Williams' hopes of winning the event.
- Lap 9: Problems involving the vehicle's distributor managed to knock out Marvin Panch from the event.
- Lap 10: Reb Wickersham suddenly felt nasty vibrations coming out of his vehicle, exiting the race for safety purposes.
- Lap 13: Bill McMahan had to leave the race because the oil temperature in his vehicle got too high.
- Lap 17: Junior Johnson fell out with engine failure while racing at high speeds.
- Lap 35: Ned Jarrett fell out with engine failure while racing at high speeds.
- Lap 38: Oil on the track forced a caution that ended on lap 41.
- Lap 40: Earl Balmer took over the lead from Richard Petty.
- Lap 41: Richard Petty took over the lead from Earl Balmer before losing it to Bobby Isaac on lap 104.
- Lap 44: J.T. Putney's chances of winning the race ended with a problematic valve affecting his vehicle.
- Lap 62: Tiny Lund's vehicle suffered from a faulty ignition, forcing him to accept a humiliating 21st-place finish.
- Lap 69: Billy Wade fell out with engine failure while racing at high speeds.
- Lap 88: Ken Spikes had a terminal crash, forcing him out of the race.
- Lap 103: Wendell Scott fell out with engine failure while racing at high speeds.
- Lap 104: Bobby Isaac took over the lead from Richard Petty.
- Lap 105: A.J. Foyt took over the lead from Bobby Isaac.
- Lap 106: Bobby Isaac took over the lead from A.J. Foyt.
- Lap 107: A.J. Foyt took over the lead from Bobby Isaac.
- Lap 111: Bobby Isaac took over the lead from A.J. Foyt before losing it to A.J. Foyt on lap 120; Larry Thomas had a terminal crash.
- Lap 114: Bobby Johns fell out with engine failure while racing at high speeds.
- Lap 121: Bobby Isaac took over the lead from A.J. Foyt before losing it to A.J. Foyt on lap 136.
- Lap 130: Debris on the backstretch forced NASCAR to slow down the vehicle until racing was re-allowed on lap 132.
- Lap 139: Bobby Isaac took over the lead from A.J. Foyt before losing it to A.J. Foyt on lap 146.
- Lap 144: LeeRoy Yarbrough had to drop out of the race due to his vehicle having a faulty fuel pump.
- Laps 146-148: A.J. Foyt and Bobby Isaac would take turns with the first-place position.
- Lap 149: Bobby Isaac took over the lead from A.J. Foyt before losing it to A.J. Foyt on lap 156.
- Lap 160: A.J. Foyt took over the lead from Bobby Isaac for the last time in this race.
- Finish: A.J. Foyt was officially declared the winner of the event.

Preceded by 1963	Firecracker 400 races 1964	Succeeded by 1965
