= Toy Bolton =

Racecar driver from North Carolina

- Born: November 22, 1926; Gastonia, North Carolina
- Died: June 8, 2001 (aged 74)

NASCAR Cup Series career
- 4 races run over 2 years
- Best finish: 81st (1966)
- First race: 1964 Textile 250 (Concord)
- Last race: 1966 Columbia 200 (Columbia)
| Wins | Top tens | Poles |
|---|---|---|
| 0 | 2 | 0 |

Toy Bolton (November 22, 1926 – June 8, 2001) was a NASCAR Grand National Series driver and team owner from Gastonia, North Carolina, US.

== Career ==
He competed in just four races in his two-year NASCAR career. Bolton's career accomplishments were two finishes in the top-ten position, 503 laps raced, $880 in total earnings ($8,732.31 when adjusted for inflation), and 241.3 miles (388.3 km) of racing experience. His first race was the 1964 Textile 250 while his last race was the 1966 Columbia 200. While Bolton never cracked the top ten in championship points, his best season was the 1966 season where he finished 81st in season points.

Bolton's sponsor was himself; stating that he was a driver/owner during his entire career. His highest earnings for a race were $530 ($5,259.23 when adjusted for inflation). This amount of money was gained at the March 13, 1966 race at Rockingham Speedway.

== Motorsports career results ==
=== NASCAR ===
(key) (Bold – Pole position awarded by qualifying time. Italics – Pole position earned by points standings or practice time. * – Most laps led.)

==== Grand National Series ====
NASCAR Grand National Series results
| Year | Team | No. | Make | 1 | 2 | 3 | 4 | 5 | 6 | 7 | 8 | 9 | 10 | 11 | 12 | 13 | 14 | 15 | 16 | 17 | 18 | 19 | 20 | 21 | 22 | 23 | 24 | 25 | 26 | 27 | 28 | 29 | 30 | 31 | 32 | 33 | 34 | 35 | 36 | 37 | 38 | 39 | 40 | 41 | 42 | 43 | 44 | 45 | 46 | 47 | 48 | 49 | 50 | 51 | 52 | 53 | 54 | 55 | 56 | 57 | 58 | 59 | 60 | 61 | 62 | NGNC | Pts | Ref |
|---|---|---|---|---|---|---|---|---|---|---|---|---|---|---|---|---|---|---|---|---|---|---|---|---|---|---|---|---|---|---|---|---|---|---|---|---|---|---|---|---|---|---|---|---|---|---|---|---|---|---|---|---|---|---|---|---|---|---|---|---|---|---|---|---|---|---|---|---|
| 1964 | Toy Bolton | 18 | Pontiac | CON; 23 | AUG | JSP | SVH | RSD | DAY | DAY | DAY | RCH | BRI | GPS | BGS | ATL | AWS | HBO | PIF | CLB | NWS | MAR | SVH | DAR | LGY | HCY | SBO | CLT | GPS | ASH | ATL | CON | NSV | CHT | BIR | VAL | PIF | DAY | ODS | OBS | BRR | ISP | GLN | LIN | BRI | NSV | MBS | AWS | DTS | ONA | CLB | BGS | STR | DAR | HCY | RCH | ODS | HBO | MAR | SVH | NWS | CLT | HAR | AUG | JAC | 140th | 48 | |
| 1966 | Toy Bolton | 61 | Chevy | AUG | RSD | DAY | DAY | DAY | CAR; 38 | BRI | ATL | HCY; 8 | CLB; 8 | GPS | BGS | NWS | MAR | DAR | LGY | MGR | MON | RCH | CLT | DTS | ASH | PIF | SMR | AWS | BLV | GPS | DAY | ODS | BRR | OXF | FON | ISP | BRI | SMR | NSV | ATL | CLB | AWS | BLV | BGS | DAR | HCY | RCH | HBO | MAR | NWS | CLT | CAR | | | | | | | | | | | | | | 81st | 680 | |
