= 1967 Daytona 500 =

Auto race run in Florida in 1967

Race details
- Race 5 of 49 in the 1967 NASCAR Grand National Series season
- 1967 Daytona 500 program cover
- Date: February 26, 1967 (55 Years Ago)
- Location: Daytona International Speedway; Daytona Beach, Florida, U.S.
- Course: Permanent racing facility 2.5 mi (4.023 km)
- Distance: 200 laps, 500 mi (804.672 km)
- Weather: Cold with temperatures of 48 °F (9 °C); wind speeds of 14 miles per hour (23 km/h)
- Average speed: 146.926 miles per hour (236.454 km/h)
- Attendance: 94,250

Pole position
Driver	Curtis Turner	Yunich-Rich

Most laps led
Driver	Mario Andretti	Holman-Moody
- Laps: 112

Winner
No. 11	Mario Andretti	Holman-Moody

The 1967 Daytona 500 was a NASCAR Grand National Series event that was held on February 26, 1967, at Daytona International Speedway in Daytona Beach, Florida. Mario Andretti won his first NASCAR Cup Series race, and was the first foreign born, European and Italian driver to win a NASCAR Cup Series race.

== Summary ==
Mario Andretti, better known for his accomplishments in open-wheel and USAC competition, won his first and only NASCAR Grand National Series event, pulling away from 1965 winner Fred Lorenzen in the closing laps. He ran in a Holman-Moody Ford. This is the only time a person born outside the United States has ever won the Daytona 500.

More than 94,000 people witnessed a 204-minute race where six cautions slowed the pace for a total of 54 laps. There were 36 lead changes among 9 drivers. Curtis Turner won the pole at a speed of 180.381 miles per hour or 290.295 kilometres per hour. Tiny Lund ran out of gas while trying to win the race. Six drivers failed to make the grid; including Don Biederman and Earl Brooks. Innes Ireland raced his final race ever when the V8 engine of his Dodge exploded outside the stands.

First Daytona 500 starts for Donnie Allison, Clyde Lynn, Ramo Stott, Gary Bettenhausen, and Coo Coo Marlin. Only Daytona 500 starts for Dorus Wisecarver, Joel Davis, Innes Ireland, Ken Spikes, Bob Pickell, and George England. Last Daytona 500 starts for H. B. Bailey, Curtis Turner, J. T. Putney, Jim Paschal, Dick Hutcherson, Don White, Blackie Watt, and Paul Lewis.

== Race results ==
Pos	Grid	No.	Driver	Entrant	Manufacturer	Laps	Winnings	Laps led	Time/Status
1	12	11	Mario Andretti	Holman-Moody	1967 Ford	200	$48,900	112	3:24:11
2	4	28	Fred Lorenzen	Holman-Moody	1967 Ford	200	$15,950	13	Lead lap, under caution
3	19	48	James Hylton	Bud Hartje	1965 Dodge	199	$10,925	0	+1 Lap
4	11	42	Tiny Lund	Petty Enterprises	1966 Plymouth	198	$6,675	1	Out of gas
5	43	40	Jerry Grant	Tom Friedkin	1967 Plymouth	197	$4,725	0	+3 Laps
6	6	26	Darel Dieringer	Junior Johnson & Associates	1967 Ford	196	$3,900	9	+4 Laps
7	18	90	Sonny Hutchins	Donlavey Racing	1967 Ford	195	$3,100	0	+5 Laps
8	2	43	Richard Petty	Petty Enterprises	1967 Plymouth	193	$3,750	0	Engine
9	42	10	Jim Hurtubise	Norm Nelson	1967 Plymouth	192	$2,500	0	+8 Laps
10	26	00	Neil Castles	Emory Gilliam	1965 Plymouth	191	$2,425	0	+9 Laps
11	44	05	Donnie Allison	Robert Harper	1966 Chevrolet	188	$3,350	0	+12 Laps
12	24	4	John Sears	L. G. DeWitt	1966 Ford	188	$2,275	0	+12 Laps
13	47	46	Roy Mayne	Tom Hunter	1966 Chevrolet	185	$2,250	0	Differential
14	29	41	Dorus Wisecarver	Ted Sidwell	1966 Ford	183	$2,225	0	+17 Laps
15	38	34	Wendell Scott	Wendell Scott	1965 Ford	176	$2,200	0	+24 Laps
16	7	99	Paul Goldsmith	Ray Nichels	1967 Plymouth	175	$2,170	0	Engine
17	36	97	Henley Gray	Henley Gray	1967 Ford	173	$2,165	0	+27 Laps
18	30	36	H. B. Bailey	H. B. Bailey	1966 Pontiac	171	$3,160	0	+29 Laps
19	23	71	Bobby Isaac	Nord Krauskopf	1967 Dodge	166	$2,155	0	Oil leak
20	33	64	Elmo Langley	Elmo Langley / Henry Woodfield	1966 Ford	165	$2,150	0	+35 Laps
21	40	20	Clyde Lynn	Clyde Lynn	1966 Ford	165	$2,145	0	+35 Laps
22	41	15	Sam McQuagg	Bud Moore Engineering	1967 Mercury	163	$2,140	0	Engine
23	25	0	Ramo Stott	Ramo Stott	1966 Plymouth	163	$1,135	0	+37 Laps
24	15	6	David Pearson	Cotton Owens	1967 Dodge	159	$4,730	31	Engine
25	1	13	Curtis Turner	Yunick-Rich Racing	1967 Chevrolet	143	$6,425	6	Engine
26	32	78	Joel Davis	Earl Ivey	1966 Chevrolet	141	$1,120	0	Hub
27	20	31	Innes Ireland	Ray Fox	1966 Dodge	126	$1,115	0	Engine
28	9	3	Buddy Baker	Ray Fox	1967 Dodge	120	$1,400	11	Engine
29	46	19	J. T. Putney	J. T. Putney	1966 Chevrolet	119	$1,105	0	+81 Laps
30	22	85	Gordon Johncock	R. L. Diestler	1967 Plymouth	112	$1,100	0	Engine
31	21	68	Gary Bettenhausen	Ranier Racing	1966 Ford	82	$1,095	0	Overheating
32	13	14	Jim Paschal	Tom Friedkin	1967 Plymouth	77	$1,090	0	Engine
33	17	37	Charlie Glotzbach	Nord Krauskopf	1965 Dodge	74	$1,085	0	Fuel pump
34	3	12	LeeRoy Yarbrough	Jon Thorne	1967 Dodge	71	$1,480	10	Engine
35	39	62	Ken Spikes	Harold Collins	1967 Pontiac	65	$1,075	0	Engine
36	10	29	Dick Hutcherson	Bondy Long	1967 Ford	46	$1,070	0	Crash
37	5	27	A. J. Foyt	Banjo Matthews	1967 Ford	44	$1,765	7	Clutch
38	14	2	Don White	Ray Nichels	1967 Dodge	43	$1,060	0	Crash
39	8	21	Cale Yarborough	Wood Brothers Racing	1967 Ford	42	$1,055	0	Suspension
40	31	16	Bobby Allison	Bud Moore Engineering	1967 Mercury	34	$1,000	0	Oil leak
41	49	80	Bob Pickell	Cozze Brothers	1966 Chevrolet	22	$950	0	Axle
42	28	76	Red Farmer	Ben Arnold	1966 Ford	21	$900	0	Engine
43	37	7	Bobby Johns	Shorty Johns	1966 Chevrolet	18	$850	0	Distributor
44	45	49	G. C. Spencer	G. C. Spencer	1967 Plymouth	15	$800	0	Engine
45	50	45	Blackie Watt	–	1966 Chevrolet	15	$750	0	Overheating
46	16	1	Paul Lewis	A. J. King	1967 Dodge	5	$700	0	Hub
47	35	79	Frank Warren	Harold Rhodes	1966 Chevrolet	5	$650	0	Oil Leak
48	34	39	Friday Hassler	Red Sharp	1966 Chevrolet	4	$600	0	Crash
49	48	51	George England	Tom Hixon	1965 Chevrolet	2	$550	0	Engine
50	27	04	Coo Coo Marlin	Charlie Hughes	1965 Chevrolet	1	$500	0	Transmission
