= 1966 Firecracker 400 =

Auto race held at Daytona International Speedway in 1966

Race details
- Race 28 of 49 in the 1966 NASCAR Grand National Series season
- 1966 Daytona 500 program cover
- Date: July 4, 1966
- Official name: Firecracker 400
- Location: Daytona International Speedway, Daytona Beach, Florida
- Course: Permanent racing facility
- Course length: 2.500 miles (4.023 km)
- Distance: 160 laps, 400 mi (643 km)
- Weather: Temperatures of 93 °F (34 °C); wind speeds of 12 miles per hour (19 km/h)
- Average speed: 153.813 miles per hour (247.538 km/h)
- Attendance: 46,200

Pole position
Driver	LeeRoy Yarbrough	Jon Thorne

Most laps led
Driver	Sam McQuagg	Ray Nichels
- Laps: 126

Winner
No. 98	Sam McQuagg	Ray Nichels

The 1966 Firecracker 400 was a NASCAR Grand National Series event that was held on July 4, 1966, at Daytona International Speedway in Daytona Beach, Florida.

== Race report ==
Forty-six Thousand two hundred fans would attended this event. It took two hours and thirty-six minutes to finish. Four cautions slowed the race for 23 laps. The average speed of the race was 153.813 miles per hour (247.538 km/h). Sam McQuagg would beat Darel Dieringer by one minute and six seconds.

This was the first time that a rear spoiler would be used in any NASCAR Cup Series race. On the day of the race, the factory engineers at Dodge would install this new invention on McQuagg's car (which caused him to go several miles per hour faster than his opponents).

Individual winnings for this event ranged from the winner's share of $13,600 ($131,801 when considering inflation) to the last-place finisher's share of $350 ($3,392 when considering inflation). A total of $55,105 was handed out to every driver ($534,038 when considering inflation).

=== Qualifying ===
Grid	No.	Driver	Manufacturer	Owner
1	12	LeeRoy Yarbrough	'66 Dodge	Jon Thorne
2	43	Richard Petty	'64 Plymouth	Petty Enterprises
3	13	Curtis Turner	'66 Chevrolet	Smokey Yunick
4	98	Sam McQuagg	'66 Dodge	Ray Nichels
5	99	Paul Goldsmith	'66 Plymouth	Ray Nichels
6	56	Jim Hurtubise	'66 Plymouth	Norm Nelson
7	31	Don White	'66 Dodge	Ray Nichels
8	5	Mario Andretti	'66 Dodge	Cotton Owens
9	3	Buddy Baker	'65 Dodge	Ray Fox
10	71	Earl Balmer	'65 Dodge	Nord Krauskopf

== Finishing order ==
1. Sam McQuagg† (No. 98)
2. Darel Dieringer† (No. 16)
3. Jim Paschal† (No. 14)
4. Curtis Turner† (No. 13)
5. Jim Hurtubise† (No. 56)
6. Don White (No. 31)
7. Marvin Panch (No. 04)
8. Tiny Lund† (No. 24)
9. James Hylton (No. 48)
10. John Sears† (No. 4)
11. Buddy Baker*† (No. 3)
12. Frank Warren (No. 79)
13. Elmo Langley† (No.64)
14. Bobby Allison†(No. 2)
15. David Pearson† (No. 6)
16. Harold Smith (No. 55)
17. Larry Hess (No. 44)
18. Eddie MacDonald (No. 89)
19. Wendell Scott† (No. 34)
20. Blackie Watt (No. 93)
21. J.D. McDuffie† (No.70)
22. Jack Lawrence (No. 06)
23. Henley Gray (No. 97)
24. LeeRoy Yarbrough*† (No. 12)
25. Roy Mayne† (No. 00)
26. Jimmy Helms* (No. 53)
27. Paul Goldsmith* (No. 99)
28. Doug Cooper* (No. 02)
29. Richard Petty* (No. 43)
30. Earl Balmer* (No. 71)
31. Mario Andretti* (No. 5)
32. Wayne Smith* (No. 38)
33. Buck Baker*† (No. 86)
34. Bunkie Blackburn*† (No. 39)
35. G.C. Spencer*† (No. 49)
36. Buddy Arrington* (No. 69)
37. J.T. Putney*† (No. 19)
38. Bobby Johns* (No. 7)
39. Jabe Thomas*† (No. 25)
40. Joel Davis* (No. 33)

† signifies that the driver is known to be deceased
* Driver failed to finish race

Preceded by 1966 Pickens 200	NASCAR Grand National races 1966	Succeeded by 1966 untitled race at Old Dominion Speedway

Preceded by 1965	Firecracker 400 races 1966	Succeeded by 1967
