= List of Daytona 500 pole position winners =

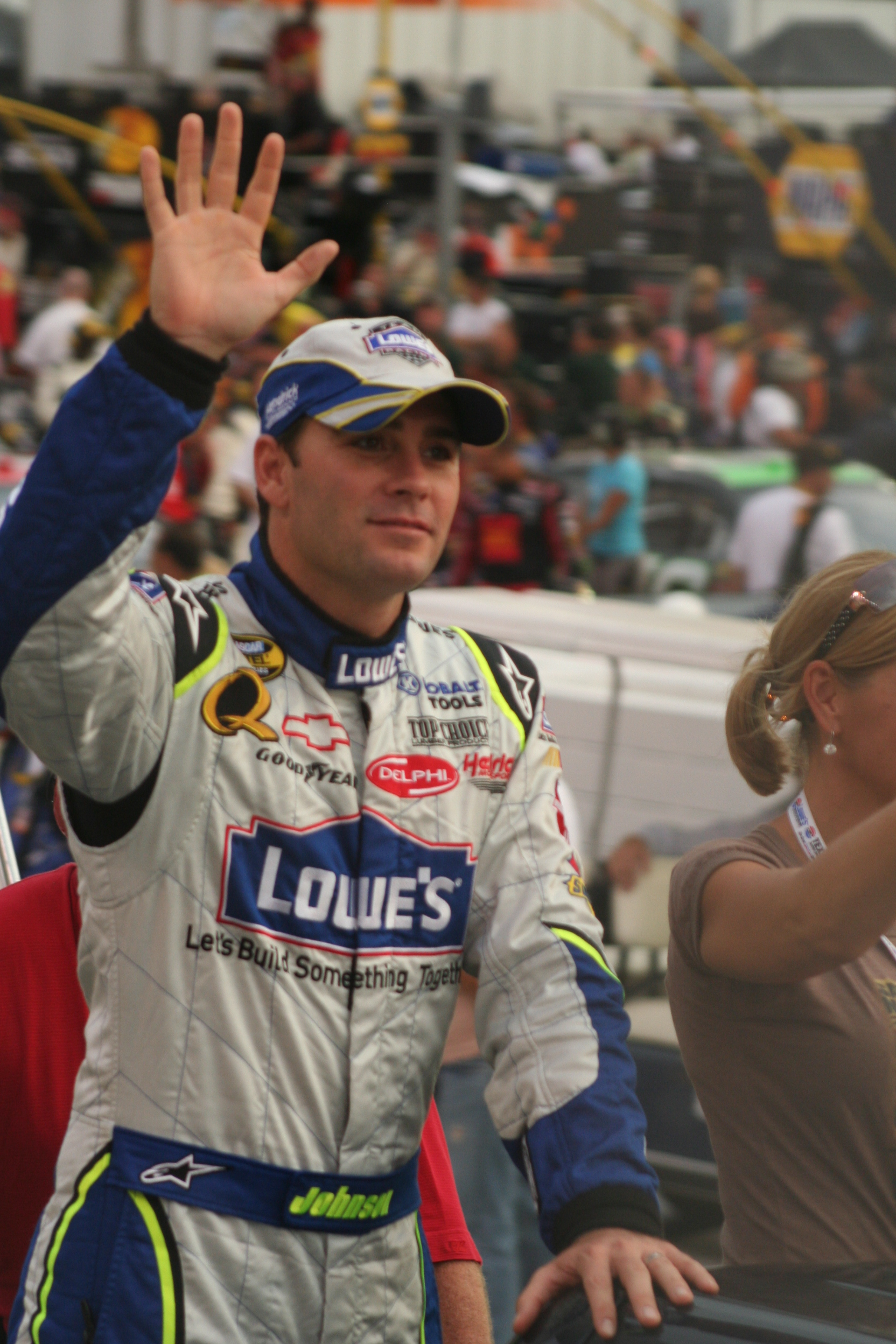
Jimmie Johnson won the pole position for the Daytona 500 in 2002 and 2008.

Daytona 500 pole position winners for the NASCAR Cup Series' Daytona 500 are rewarded with being the driver to lead the field across the start line at the beginning of the 200-lap 500-mile (800 km) race. Pole qualifying for the Daytona 500 is held one weekend before the race at the Daytona International Speedway. The driver to complete the fastest single lap in the final of three rounds in the knockout qualifying session around the 2.5-mile (4.0 km) high-banked tri-oval superspeedway earns the pole position. The first Daytona 500 was held in 1959 and in 1982, it became the opening event for the NASCAR Cup season. The term "pole position" was originally coined in the American horse racing industry, and indicated the position of the starter being next to the "poles", which established the boundaries of the course. As of the 2024, under the Race Team Alliance charter system, the 36 chartered cars are guaranteed entry for the race, with the four remaining spots being taken up by non-chartered teams (assuming four non-charted cars enter the race). The two drivers with the fastest qualifying lap in qualifying are awarded the first and second starting positions for the Daytona 500 and the two non-charter teams with the fastest qualifying lap are given entry for race. The other positions for the race are determined by the Daytona Duels, with the two highest finishing non-charter teams in the duels also qualifying for the race.

Bill Elliott set the pole position qualifying record on February 9, 1987, when he navigated around the circuit with a 42.782-second lap, which is an average speed of 210.364 miles per hour (338.548 km/h). From 1988 to 2018, NASCAR required teams to install a restrictor plate between the throttle body and the engine. This rule was enacted as an effort to slow the cars speed in response to an accident in which fans suffered minor injuries when Bobby Allison's car blew a tire and crashed at over 200 miles per hour (320 km/h) during a race at Talladega Superspeedway in 1987. Depending upon the sponsor, era, or a specific year, the qualifying races have been referred to as the "Duels" or the "Twins".

== Procedure ==
Track layout

The qualifying session for pole position is held before the Daytona 500. Drivers take one timed lap to determine their time. The fastest qualifier takes the pole position for the Daytona 500 and starts on the inside of the first row; the second fastest starts alongside him on the outside, referred to as the "outside pole." Both front row starters are locked into these starting positions.

The 2015 race used the standard knockout qualifying system. Up to the 2014 race, drivers took two timed laps, and the better of the two timed laps was the driver's lap for purposes of Daytona 500 qualifying. Until 2001, NASCAR offered a second (and at times, a third) round of qualifying for teams who wished to improve their qualifying times. Drivers and teams decided if they were content with their first attempt, and "stood on their time", or if they wanted to improve their chances by attempting a "second-round qualifying" attempt. If satisfied with the original attempt, the team was required to notify NASCAR within five minutes of the final practice sessions, and before the beginning of the "second-round qualifying" attempts. Drivers who made second-round attempts started behind first-round only drivers; however, the qualifying times were crucial, since it determined a driver's fall back time should he fail to finish in the top 14 of the qualifying races. The strategy was usually done by drivers whose times would not make the race or be on the bubble. The second round of qualifying ended in 2001.

The two fastest drivers in the final qualifying session (the Daytona 500 pole winner and the "outside" pole winner) only are also awarded the pole positions for the two qualifying races held the following Thursday. Drivers are ranked by the furthest number of rounds advanced in qualifying, and then their qualifying time in the final round that they reached. Those who rank with an odd-numbered position are assigned to the first qualifying race, and those with an even-numbered rank to the second race. Cars in the final round of qualifying start the race in the front. The starting spots for the third through 32nd positions are determined by the drivers' finishing position in the qualifying races, with only the top 15 drivers' results, excluding the pole sitter in each race, advancing to the feature. Since 2005, each of the two qualifying races is 150-mile (240 km) long, or 60 laps. From its inception in 1959 until 1967, it was 40 laps, and from 1969 to 2004 it was 50 laps. After the races, prior to establishment of the Race Team Alliance charter system, the top four drivers in speed of those that failed to advance through the qualifying race are positioned in positions 33–36. The speeds used for this does not reflect their official qualifying times; regardless of which qualifying round they reached, their time used is the fastest time set in any round (first, second, or third), and does not reflect their starting position in the Duels. Positions 37-42 will go to the top six teams (not drivers) in points from the previous year's owners (team) points standings of teams not already qualified, again with their positions based on speed, again based on the fastest time in any round, not in the final round that they reached. The final starting position in the Daytona 500 (43rd overall) is reserved by NASCAR to allow one former NASCAR champion to start the race under the "champion's provisional" rule. Also known as the "Petty Rule", this rule was established in 1989 when NASCAR's winningest driver (Richard Petty) failed to qualify for an event at Richmond International Raceway. If the Champion's Provisional is not necessary, the seventh-highest team in the previous year's points advances, and positions 37-43 are positioned based on speed from their fastest round of qualifying.

From 2005 until 2012, NASCAR adopted an "All Exempt Tour" format similar to golf. The teams in the top 35 of owner points (resulting in alternate nickname of "Top 35 Rule") during the previous season would be eligible to run in the Daytona 500, regardless of qualifying speed. The qualifying races now determine the relative starting position for these 35 drivers plus the starting positions for an additional seven to eight teams. The top 35 drivers, plus two non-top 35 drivers from each qualifier, start in the first 39 positions of the 500. The 40th, 41st, and 42nd starting positions are given to the fastest three non-exempt cars based on qualifying speed, which have not already qualified. The 43rd starting position is awarded to the most recent previous NASCAR champion who attempted to qualify; it is given to the fastest car that had not qualified if all previous champions qualified into the field. In 2008, the qualifying competition became known as the "Coors Light Pole" when Coors replaced Budweiser as the primary sponsor. Budweiser's parent company, Anheuser-Busch Corporation, had been sponsoring the award since 1979, and would return in that role midway during the 2018 season after Coors did not renew their agreement as the Pole Award sponsor.

Under the current charter system, all chartered teams (maximum of 36) are guaranteed entry to the race, meaning the races only set the inside and outside starting positions for those teams. Each race's top finishing unchartered team advances to the Daytona 500, as well as two fastest "open" (non-charter) in the qualifying time trials for the last two starting grid slots (next fastest, if the fastest "open" car in the time trials was also the top "open" car in the Duel), for a total of four "open" cars and 40 overall cars on the grid.

=== History ===
In early years, qualifying had varying formats: from one timed lap, to the average of two laps, to the better of two laps. The idea of having two individual races to establish the starting lineup of the Daytona 500 dates back to the first race in 1959. That event, advertised as "the 500 Mile NASCAR International Sweepstakes", featured cars from NASCAR's Grand National division racing against cars in the Convertible division. The first of the 100-mile (160 km) qualifying races consisted of Convertible division cars and the second of Grand National cars. Shorty Rollins won the 100-mile Convertible race to become the track's first winner. When the green flag was thrown on the first Daytona 500, 59 cars raced to the starting line; the event was held without a caution period during the entire race. In 1960 (incidentally, the first ever national telecast of a NASCAR race), the last chance race was eliminated; from 1960 through 1967 the qualifying events were 100 miles (160 km) in length. When the season opened in 1968, the qualifying races were increased to 125 miles (201 km), which meant the drivers would have to make at least one pit-stop to refuel (though the races were not held because of weather in 1968). Prior to 1971, the qualifying races yielded points to the drivers' championship.

The 12-mile-per-hour (19 km/h) reduction in speed for the 1971 qualification was a result of NASCAR's effort to limit the increasing speeds achieved through the late 1960s and early 1970s. Engine size and technology, along with increased aerodynamic styling changes, brought speeds to over 200 miles per hour (320 km/h) at some of the larger superspeedways. In an effort to reduce the escalating costs of developing faster racing equipment, increased horsepower, and the lack of parity in competition, NASCAR implemented several restrictions for the 1971 season, attempting to reduce speed by two methods. It experimented with restrictor plates for the first time at Michigan in August 1970. At the beginning of the 1971 season, NASCAR limited an engine's cubic inch displacement. The reductions had the effect of reducing costs for teams, but also limiting the horsepower and top speeds of NASCAR teams. At the time, NASCAR founder Bill France Sr. stated:

Special cars, including the Mercury Cyclone Spoiler, Ford Talladega, Dodge Daytona, Dodge Charger 500, and Plymouth Superbird shall be limited to a maximum engine size of 305 cubic inches.

— Bill France Sr.

Corporate sponsors purchased naming rights to qualifying races; between 1982 and 1984, Uno cards was the title sponsor for the "Uno Twin 125's" qualifying events. In 1985 they became known as "7-Eleven Twin 125's"; no sponsors funded the 1988 and 1989 qualifying events and the races were called "Daytona Twin Qualifiers". Gatorade became the sponsor of the dual qualifying events in 1991. In 2005, the event was increased 150 miles (240 km), and became known as the "Gatorade Duels" until 2015. Starting in 2016 CanAm took over sponsorship of the races, followed by Gander RV in 2019 and Bluegreen Vacations since 2020.

Since the restrictor plate era began in 1988 until 2014, qualifying was the better single lap of two; drivers are permitted one warm-up lap followed by two consecutive timed laps. Since restrictor plate cars require more time to accelerate to full speed, drivers often consider their first timed lap a "throwaway lap," and use it essentially as a second warm-up lap; and the second timed lap is usually the fastest of the three laps.

In August 2009, NASCAR announced that it would reschedule the 2010 opening round of qualifying to avoid a conflict with the NFL Super Bowl. The events that determine the top two starters for the Daytona 500 were rescheduled after the NFL moved the Super Bowl day one week to February 7, 2010. Qualifying had originally been scheduled for February 7, but NASCAR moved the date back to Saturday, February 6, to avoid conflict with the NFL. Daytona Speedway president, Robin Braig, stated:

We're excited about the new schedule, [...] By moving Daytona 500 qualifying to Saturday, we are now providing even more value to our race fans. (They) can now enjoy a unique racing triple-header as well as all the festivities surrounding the Super Bowl the following day.

— Robin Braig,

In 2014, NASCAR adopted, starting with the second race of the year in Phoenix, a Formula One-style knockout qualifying system. After tweaking it in the 2014 GEICO 500 at Talladega, the format became three five-minute rounds, with the first round being split as two five-minute rounds with half the field in each round. As is the case for standard knockout qualifying, the top 24 advanced to the second round, and the top 12 advancing to the final round. This format was used at the Daytona 500 for the first time in 2015, but was soon abandoned for restrictor plate races after a series of incidents taking place during qualifying.

Restrictor plate races eventually gets a new two-round qualifying format starting from the first Talladega race. In round 1, each car goes out one at a time for one warm-up, one timed, and one cool down lap. The order for the cars released was determined by a random draw. NASCAR will release the next car to begin their lap while the current car is finishing their timed lap with the goal to have the next car start their timed lap no more than 20 seconds after the previous car finishes. The top 12 cars from round 1 will make a second run in the same format to determine the starting lineup for positions 1–12, with the order of cars released are the invert of round 1 result (i.e. the 12th placed car will be released first). Positions 13th and below are determined by round 1 result.

== Daytona 500 pole winners ==
Year	Driver	Car make	Average speed	Restrictor	Notes
1959	Bob Welborn	Chevrolet	140.121 mph (225.503 km/h)	Not in use	Not fastest qualifier (see below); Entire lineup set by Qualifying races
1960	Cotton Owens	Pontiac	149.892 mph (241.228 km/h)	Not in use	Not fastest qualifier (see below)
1961	Fireball Roberts	Pontiac	155.709 mph (250.589 km/h)	Not in use	Won Qualifying race
1962	Fireball Roberts	Pontiac	156.999 mph (252.665 km/h)	Not in use	Won Qualifying race; won Daytona 500
1963	Fireball Roberts	Pontiac	160.943 mph (259.013 km/h)	Not in use	Not fastest qualifier (see below)
1964	Paul Goldsmith	Plymouth	174.910 mph (281.490 km/h)	Not in use	Track record at time (see below)
1965	Darel Dieringer	Mercury	171.151 mph (275.441 km/h)	Not in use	Also won Qualifying race
1966	Richard Petty	Plymouth	175.165 mph (281.901 km/h)	Not in use	Won Daytona 500
1967	Curtis Turner	Chevrolet	180.831 mph (291.019 km/h)	Not in use	
1968	Cale Yarborough	Mercury	189.222 mph (304.523 km/h)	Not in use	Won Daytona 500
1969	Buddy Baker (1)	Dodge	188.901 mph (304.007 km/h)	Not in use	Not fastest qualifier (see below)
1970	Cale Yarborough (2)	Mercury	194.015 mph (312.237 km/h)	Not in use	
1971	A. J. Foyt	Mercury	182.744 mph (294.098 km/h)	Between 1.25 and 1.65 inches based on engine, big block (427ci) only. None for small block (358ci) engines.	
1972	Bobby Isaac	Dodge	186.632 mph (300.355 km/h)	Between 1.25 and 1.65 inches based on engine, big block (427ci) only. None for small block (358ci) engines.	
1973	Buddy Baker (2)	Dodge	185.662 mph (298.794 km/h)	Between 1.25 and 1.65 inches based on engine, big block (427ci) only. None for small block (358ci) engines.	
1974	David Pearson	Chevrolet	185.017 mph (297.756 km/h)	Not in use	First season of 5900cc engine formula (358 cubic inches).
1975	Donnie Allison (1)	Chevrolet	185.827 mph (299.060 km/h)	Not in use	
1976	Ramo Stott	Chevrolet	183.456 mph (295.244 km/h)	Not in use	Awarded pole after disqualifications in inspection for nitrous oxide (see below). Not fastest qualifier.
1977	Donnie Allison (2)	Chevrolet	188.048 mph (302.634 km/h)	Not in use	
1978	Cale Yarborough (3)	Oldsmobile	187.536 mph (301.810 km/h)	Not in use	
1979	Buddy Baker (4)	Oldsmobile	196.049 mph (315.510 km/h)	Not in use	
1980	Buddy Baker (4)	Oldsmobile	194.099 mph (312.372 km/h)	Not in use	Not fastest qualifier (see below); Won Daytona 500
1981	Bobby Allison	Pontiac	194.624 mph (313.217 km/h)	Not in use	
1982	Benny Parsons	Pontiac	196.317 mph (315.942 km/h)	Not in use	
1983	Ricky Rudd	Chevrolet	198.864 mph (320.041 km/h)	Not in use	Not fastest qualifier (see below). Finished twenty-fourth due to camshaft failure.
1984	Cale Yarborough (4)	Chevrolet	201.848 mph (324.843 km/h)	Not in use	Won Daytona 500
1985	Bill Elliott	Ford	205.114 mph (330.099 km/h)	Not in use	Won Daytona 500
1986	Bill Elliott	Ford	205.039 mph (329.978 km/h)	Not in use	Finished thirteenth.
1987	Bill Elliott	Ford	210.364 mph (338.548 km/h)	Not in use	All-time track record; won second Daytona 500
1988	Ken Schrader	Chevrolet	193.823 mph (311.928 km/h)	1 inch plate	Finished sixth.
1989	Ken Schrader	Chevrolet	196.996 mph (317.034 km/h)	1 inch plate	Also won first qualifying race, he finished second.
1990	Ken Schrader	Chevrolet	196.515 mph (316.260 km/h)	15/16 inch plate	Geoff Bodine started on pole (see below). Ken finished fortieth due to engine failure while Bodine finished ninth.
1991	Davey Allison	Ford	195.955 mph (315.359 km/h)	29/32 inch plate	Finished fifteenth after a crash.
1992	Sterling Marlin	Ford	192.213 mph (309.337 km/h)	7/8 inch plate	Finished thirty-fifth after a crash.
1993	Kyle Petty	Pontiac	189.426 mph (304.852 km/h)	7/8 inch plate	Finished thirty-first after a crash.
1994	Loy Allen Jr.	Ford	190.158 mph (306.030 km/h)	7/8 inch plate	Allen was the first rookie pole winner. He finished twenty-second.
1995	Dale Jarrett (1)	Ford	196.498 mph (316.233 km/h)	7/8 inch plate	Finished fifth.
1996	Dale Earnhardt	Chevrolet	189.510 mph (304.987 km/h)	29/32 inch plate Compression ratio limit on engines established at 14:1.	Finished second.
1997	Mike Skinner	Chevrolet	189.813 mph (305.474 km/h)	29/32 inch plate	Finished twelfth.
1998	Bobby Labonte	Pontiac	192.415 mph (309.662 km/h)	29/32 inch plate Compression ratio limit on engines reduced to 12:1.	Finished second.
1999	Jeff Gordon (1)	Chevrolet	195.067 mph (313.930 km/h)	29/32 inch plate	Won Daytona 500 for second time.
2000	Dale Jarrett (2)	Ford	191.091 mph (307.531 km/h)	29/32 inch plate	Won Daytona 500 for third time.
2001	Bill Elliott (4)	Dodge	183.565 mph (295.419 km/h)	15/16 inch plate	
2002	Jimmie Johnson (1)	Chevrolet	185.831 mph (299.066 km/h)	15/16 inch plate	Johnson's rookie season, having run only three races in 2001
2003	Jeff Green	Chevrolet	186.606 mph (300.313 km/h)	7/8 inch plate	
2004	Greg Biffle	Ford	188.387 mph (303.179 km/h)	29/32 inch plate	Engine failed in final practice; Dale Earnhardt Jr. started first and won race (see below)
2005	Dale Jarrett (3)	Ford	188.312 mph (303.059 km/h)	57/64 inch plate	
2006	Jeff Burton	Chevrolet	189.151 mph (304.409 km/h)	57/64 inch plate	
2007	David Gilliland	Ford	186.320 mph (299.853 km/h)	7/8 inch plate	
2008	Jimmie Johnson (2)	Chevrolet	187.075 mph (301.068 km/h)	31/32 inch plate	
2009	Martin Truex Jr.	Chevrolet	188.001 mph (302.558 km/h)	31/32 inch plate	
2010	Mark Martin	Chevrolet	191.188 mph (307.687 km/h)	63/64 inch plate	Oldest Daytona 500 pole-sitter at age of 51.
2011	Dale Earnhardt Jr.	Chevrolet	186.089 mph (299.481 km/h)	29/32 inch plate	Crashed in Wednesday practice; Kurt Busch, who won the first Duel, started first. First race to use fuel injection system after engine formula changed.
2012	Carl Edwards	Ford	194.738 mph (313.400 km/h)	29/32 inch plate	
2013	Danica Patrick	Chevrolet	196.434 mph (316.130 km/h)	29/32 inch plate	First woman to win a pole in the Daytona 500 and first woman to win a pole in any Cup race. First Australian car to win a pole in any Cup race.
2014	Austin Dillon	Chevrolet	196.019 mph (315.462 km/h)	29/32 inch plate	First time the No. 3 car has gone to the pole in Daytona since 1996, and the first appearance for the No. 3 in the NASCAR Cup Series since 2001.
2015	Jeff Gordon (2)	Chevrolet	201.293 mph (323.950 km/h) (Q3)	29/32 inch plate	Not fastest qualifier; Three-round Formula One-style group knockout qualifying used.
2016	Chase Elliott	Chevrolet	196.314 mph (315.937 km/h) (Q2)	29/32 inch plate	The youngest pole-sitter in 500 history at the age of 20. Indianapolis 500 style two-round qualifying system used (all cars take one round, then top 12 cars take a second round for pole).
2017	Chase Elliott (2)	Chevrolet	192.872 mph (310.397 km/h) (Q2)	29/32 inch plate	Second consecutive pole for Elliott and third consecutive for crew chief Alan Gustafson.
2018	Alex Bowman	Chevrolet	195.644 mph (314.858 km/h)	29/32 inch plate	Fourth consecutive pole for Hendrick Motorsports
2019	William Byron	Chevrolet	194.305 mph (312.704 km/h)	29/32 inch plate	Fifth consecutive pole for Hendrick Motorsports. Final 500 to use a restrictor plate.
2020	Ricky Stenhouse Jr.	Chevrolet	194.582 mph (313.149 km/h)	29/32 inch plate	59/64 inch tapered spacer
2021	Alex Bowman (2)	Chevrolet	191.261 mph (307.805 km/h)	57/64 inch tapered spacer	Seventh consecutive year a Hendrick engine was on pole.
2022	Kyle Larson	Chevrolet	181.159 mph (291.547 km/h) (Q2)	57/64 inch tapered spacer	Second consecutive pole for Hendrick Motorsports; fifth consecutive front row start for Alex Bowman. Eighth consecutive Hendrick engine pole win.
2023	Alex Bowman (3)	Chevrolet	181.025 mph (291.331 km/h)	57/64 inch tapered spacer	Third consecutive pole for Hendrick Motorsports; sixth consecutive front row start for Alex Bowman. Ninth consecutive Hendrick engine pole win.
2024	Joey Logano	Ford	181.947 mph (292.815 km/h)	57/64 inch tapered spacer	
2025	Chase Briscoe	Toyota	182.745 mph (294.100 km/h)	57/64 inch tapered spacer	First Daytona 500 pole for Toyota as a manufacturer. First Joe Gibbs Racing Daytona 500 pole in 27 years since Bobby Labonte in 1998.
2026	Kyle Busch	Chevrolet	183.651 mph (295.558 km/h)	57/64 inch tapered spacer	First Daytona 500 pole for Busch after 21 years of attempting. First Richard Childress Racing Daytona 500 pole since 2014 when Austin Dillon took pole.

=== Notes ===
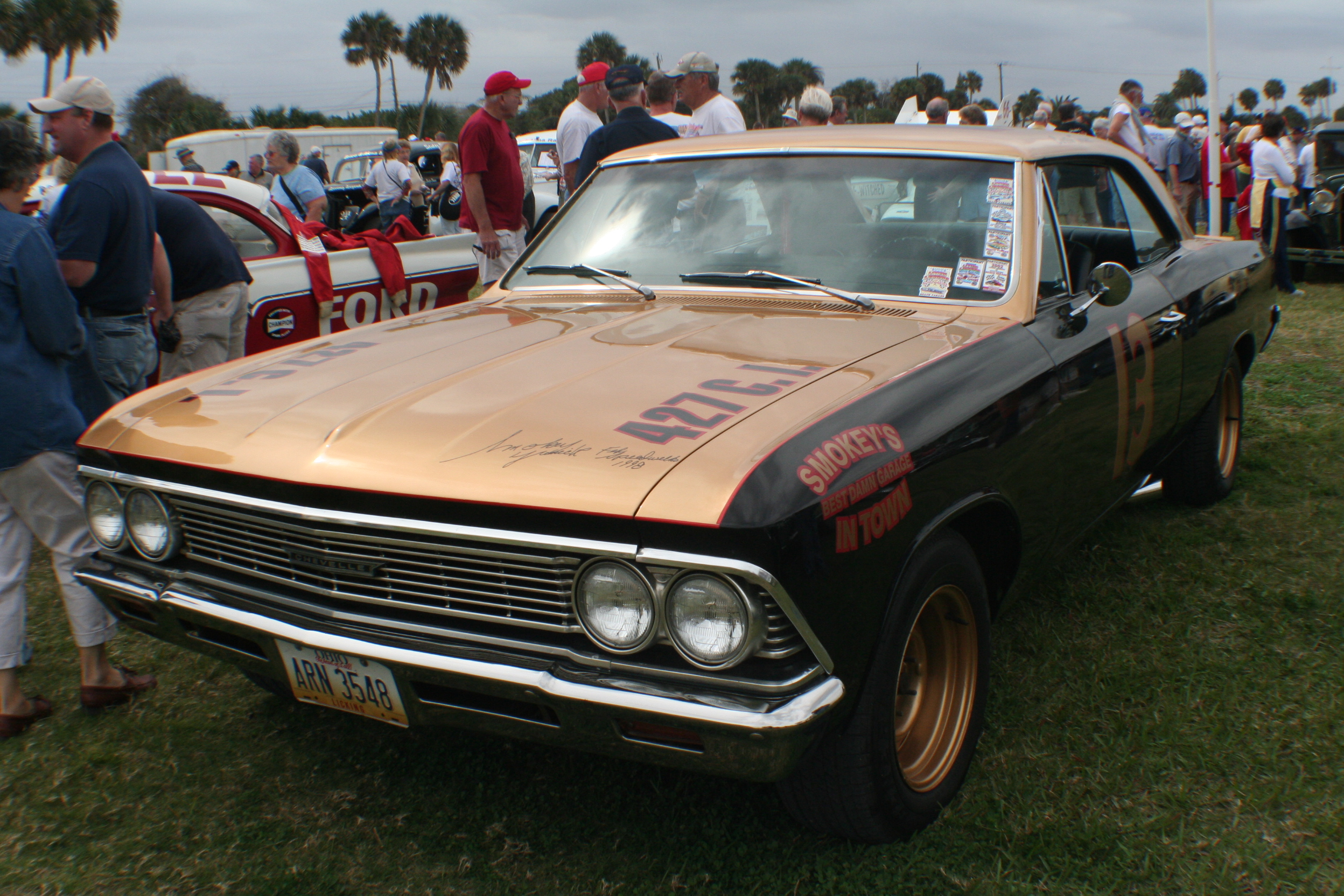
Curtis Turner's 1967 pole qualifying car

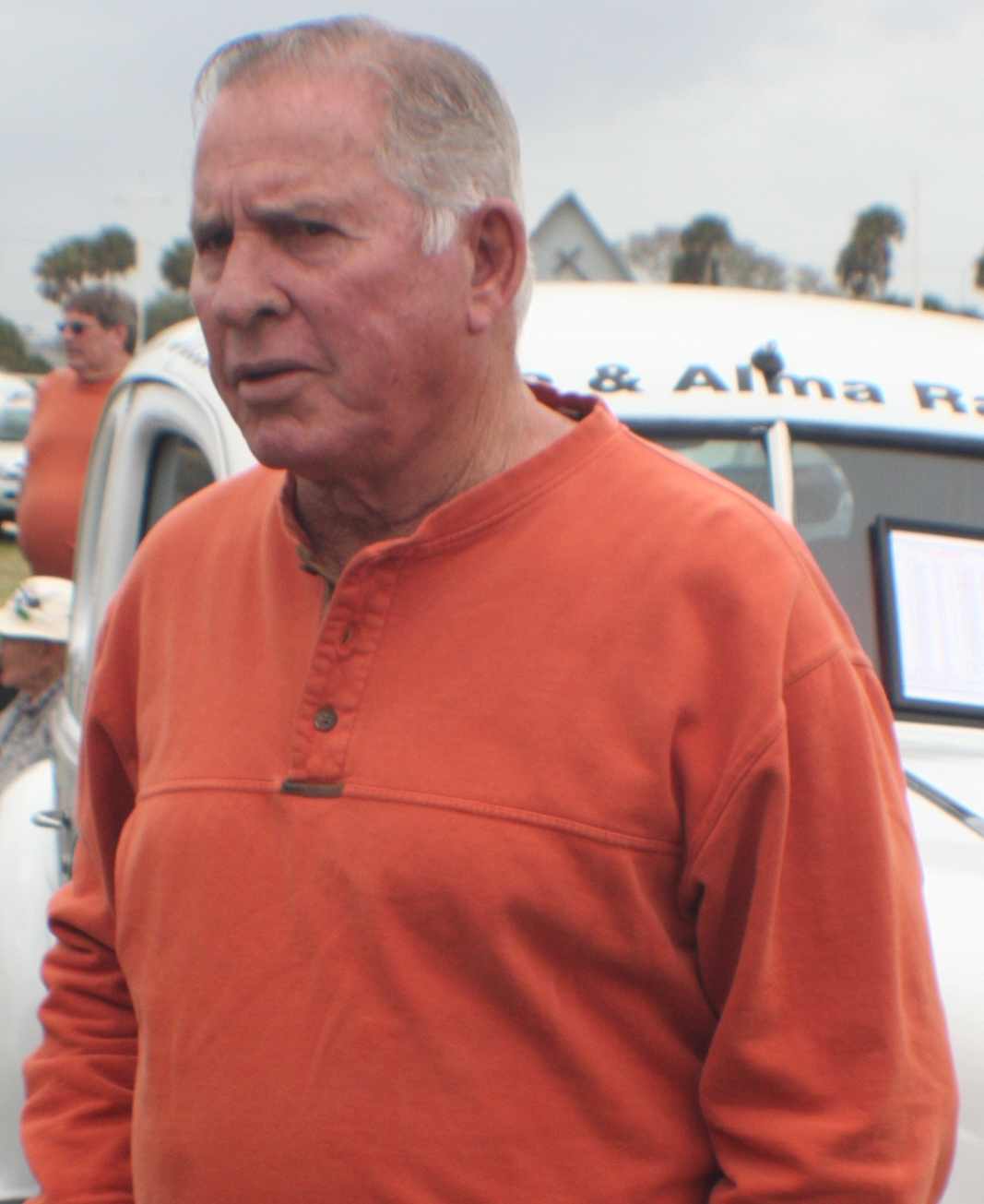
David Pearson, 1974 pole winner

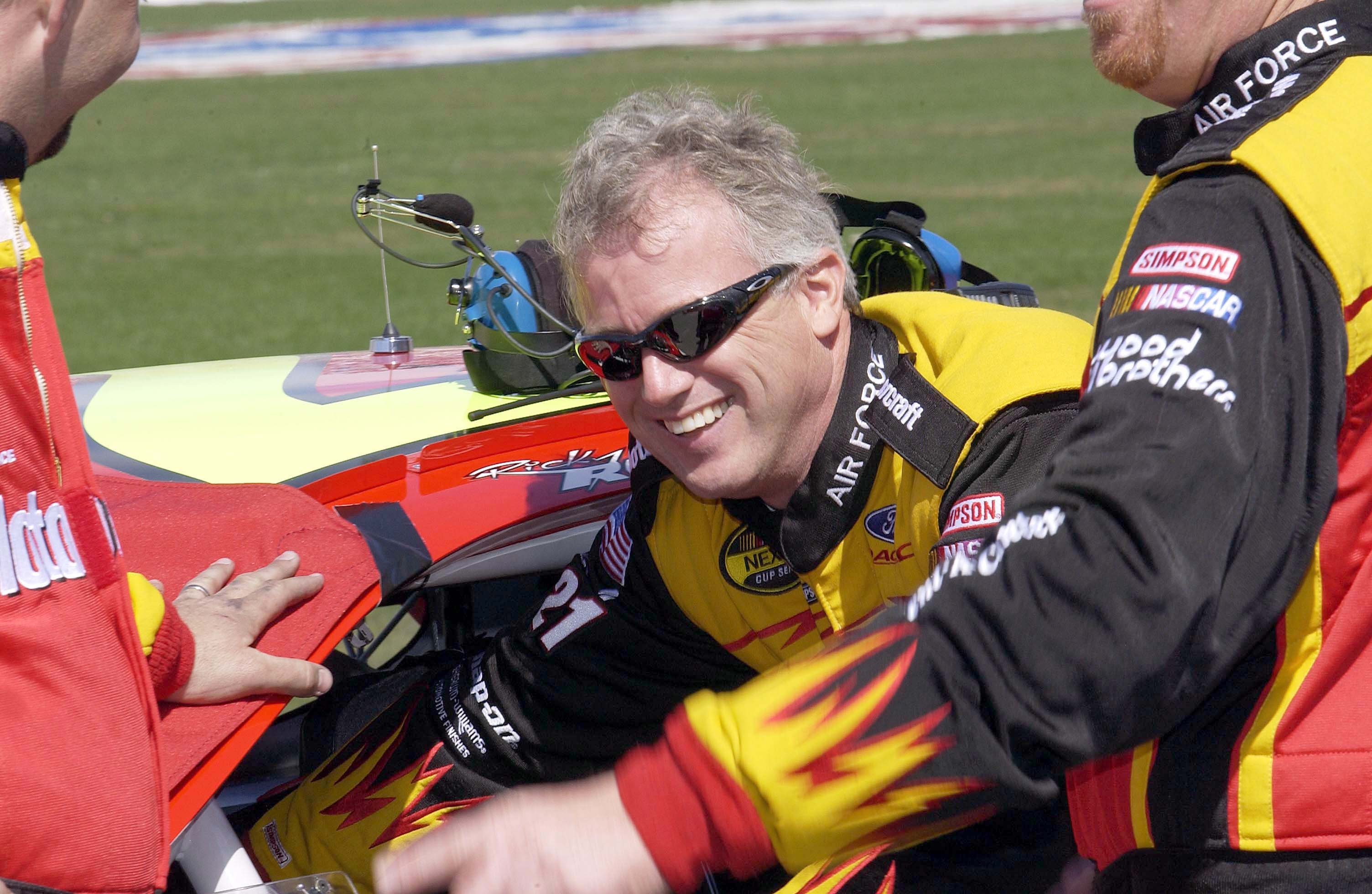
Ricky Rudd, 1983 pole position winner

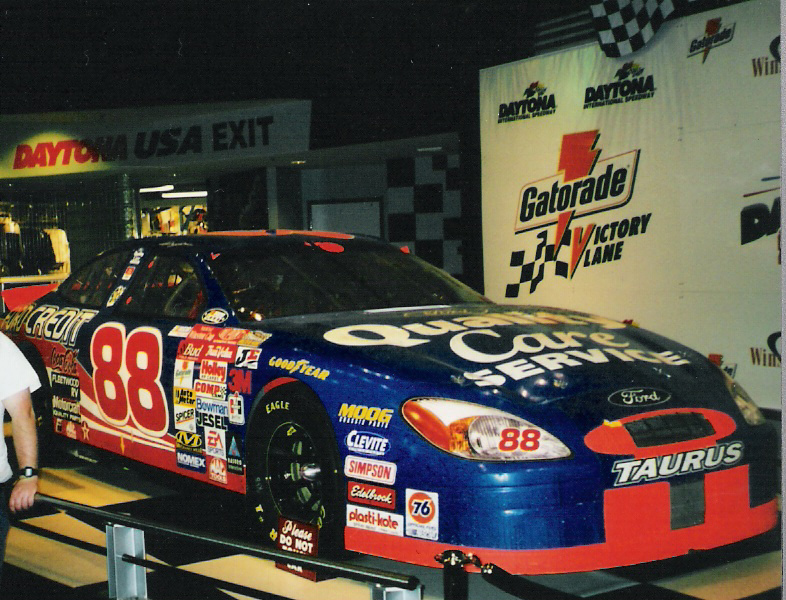
Dale Jarrett's 2000 pole & race winning car

- 1959: Cotton Owens (143.198 mph) was the fastest qualifier.
- 1960: Fireball Roberts (151.556 mph) was the fastest qualifier.
- 1963: Johnny Rutherford (165.183 mph) was the fastest qualifier.
- 1964: On April 4, 1959, Dick Rathmann set the one-lap Daytona International Speedway track qualifying record driving in a USAC Champ Car race at 173.210 mph. The Champ Cars would not return to the track. The one-lap record held until 1964 when Paul Goldsmith finally broke it in a NASCAR stock car with a speed of 174.910 mph.
- 1969: David Pearson (190.029 mph) was the fastest qualifier.
- 1976: A. J. Foyt (185.943 mph) was the fastest qualifier.
- 1980: A. J. Foyt (195.020 mph) was the fastest qualifier again.
- 1983: On his first of two qualifying laps, Cale Yarborough ran a lap of 200.503 mph, a new track record, and the first 200 mph lap (320 km/h) in Daytona history. On the second lap, however, gusty winds caused him to spin, flip over, and crash in turn 4. The car had to be withdrawn, and the lap did not count. Yarborough started a backup car on race day, and was moved to the rear of the field. Ricky Rudd was credited with the fastest qualifying speed at 198.864 mph.
- 1990: Pole winner Ken Schrader crashed during the Gatorade Twin 125's, and was required to start a back-up car on race day. His car was moved to the rear of the field, and duel winner Geoff Bodine moved up to the pole position.
- 2003: Starting with the 2002 Subway 400 at Rockingham (the race after the 2002 Daytona 500), teams were not permitted to change engines during the race week. For the Daytona 500, a team must race their qualifying race with the same engine they used to qualify. An engine change between first qualifying practice and the qualifying race means the team must start in the back for that race only. After the qualifying races, teams will be allowed one engine change before the start of the final Daytona 500 practices on the Saturday before the race. The engine in the car for the Saturday practices before the Daytona 500 is the declared engine, with any engine change after the first Daytona 500 practice that occurs after the qualifying race will be penalized with the team being sent to the rear of the field. As is the case for a backup car after a crash, the respective column of cars moves up when the offending car is moved to the back. This is the first Daytona 500 with the new engine rule.
- 2004: Greg Biffle won his first Nextel Cup Series pole but changed engines after final Daytona 500 practice the Saturday before the race. This moved the inside column of cars up, and Dale Earnhardt Jr. started first and won the race.
- 2011: Dale Earnhardt Jr. won the Coors Light Pole Award, but crashed in Wednesday practice. Although a backup car was implemented and Earnhardt started in the rear for the first Duel, he also was moved to the rear for the Daytona 500 under an oddity in Daytona 500 qualifying rules. Drivers who switch to backup cars after incidents in Wednesday practice do not have to move to the back for the Daytona 500 if the car raced in the Duel is the same car for the 500, unless it is one of the front row qualifying cars. Kurt Busch, who won the first Duel, started first.
- 2015: Starting with 2014 The Profit on CNBC 500 the next week at Phoenix, multiple-round knockout qualifying, used in many codes of motorsport, was implemented. The knockout format was used for the first time at the Daytona 500, using the old restrictor plate qualifying format (three five-minute rounds, with the first round split evenly between cars, each having a five-minute round, top 24 advance to the second round, top 12 advancing to the final round). Six drivers were faster than pole speed in Q1, and three drivers (including eventual pole winner Jeff Gordon) were faster than the pole speed in Q2. The pole time was set in Q3. Aric Almirola (44.473 seconds/202.370 mph (325.683 km/h)) was the fastest qualifier, but the time was set in Q1; he finished 15th in Q2 (originally 17th, but moved up after two post-Q3 disqualifications) and did not advance to Q3.
- 2016: Starting with the 2015 GEICO 500 at Talladega, one-lap single car qualifying was used on plate tracks. After the round was completed, the top 12 cars advance to Q2, where the drivers take one more timed lap. The two drivers with the fastest laps in Q2 start first and second, respectively, in the Daytona 500.

== Statistics ==
=== Multiple Daytona 500 pole winners ===
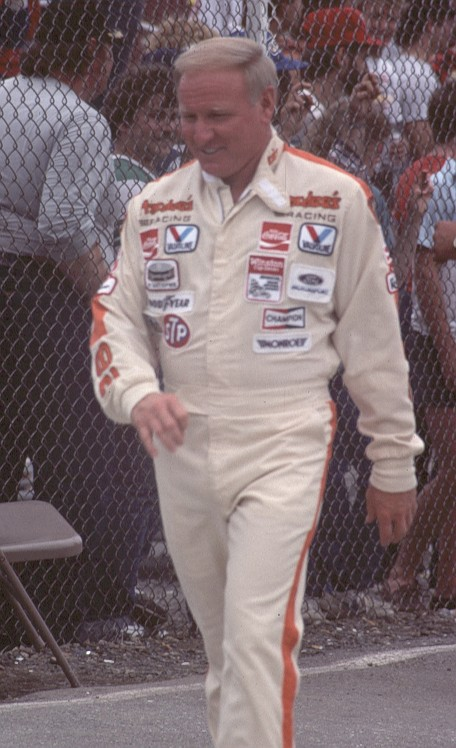
Cale Yarborough qualified on the pole 4 times (1968, 1970, 1978, 1984).

# wins	Driver	Years won	Ref
4	Buddy Baker	1969, 1973, 1979, 1980	
4	Cale Yarborough	1968, 1970, 1978, 1984	
4	Bill Elliott	1985, 1986, 1987, 2001	
3	Fireball Roberts	1961, 1962, 1963	
3	Ken Schrader	1988, 1989, 1990	
3	Dale Jarrett	1995, 2000, 2005	
3	Alex Bowman	2018, 2021, 2023	
2	Donnie Allison	1975, 1977	
2	Jimmie Johnson	2002, 2008	
2	Jeff Gordon	1999, 2015	
2	Chase Elliott	2016, 2017	

=== Manufacturer pole wins ===
# Wins	Manufacturer	Years won
33	Chevrolet	1959, 1967, 1974–1977, 1983–1984, 1988–1990, 1996–1997, 1999, 2002–2003, 2006, 2008–2011, 2013–2023, 2026
13	Ford	1985–1987, 1991–1992, 1994–1995, 2000, 2004–2005, 2007, 2012, 2024
8	Pontiac	1960–1963, 1981–1982, 1993, 1998
4	Dodge	1969, 1972–1973, 2001
4	Mercury	1965, 1968, 1970–1971
3	Oldsmobile	1978–1980
2	Plymouth	1964, 1966
1	Toyota	2025

=== Consecutive Daytona 500 pole winners ===
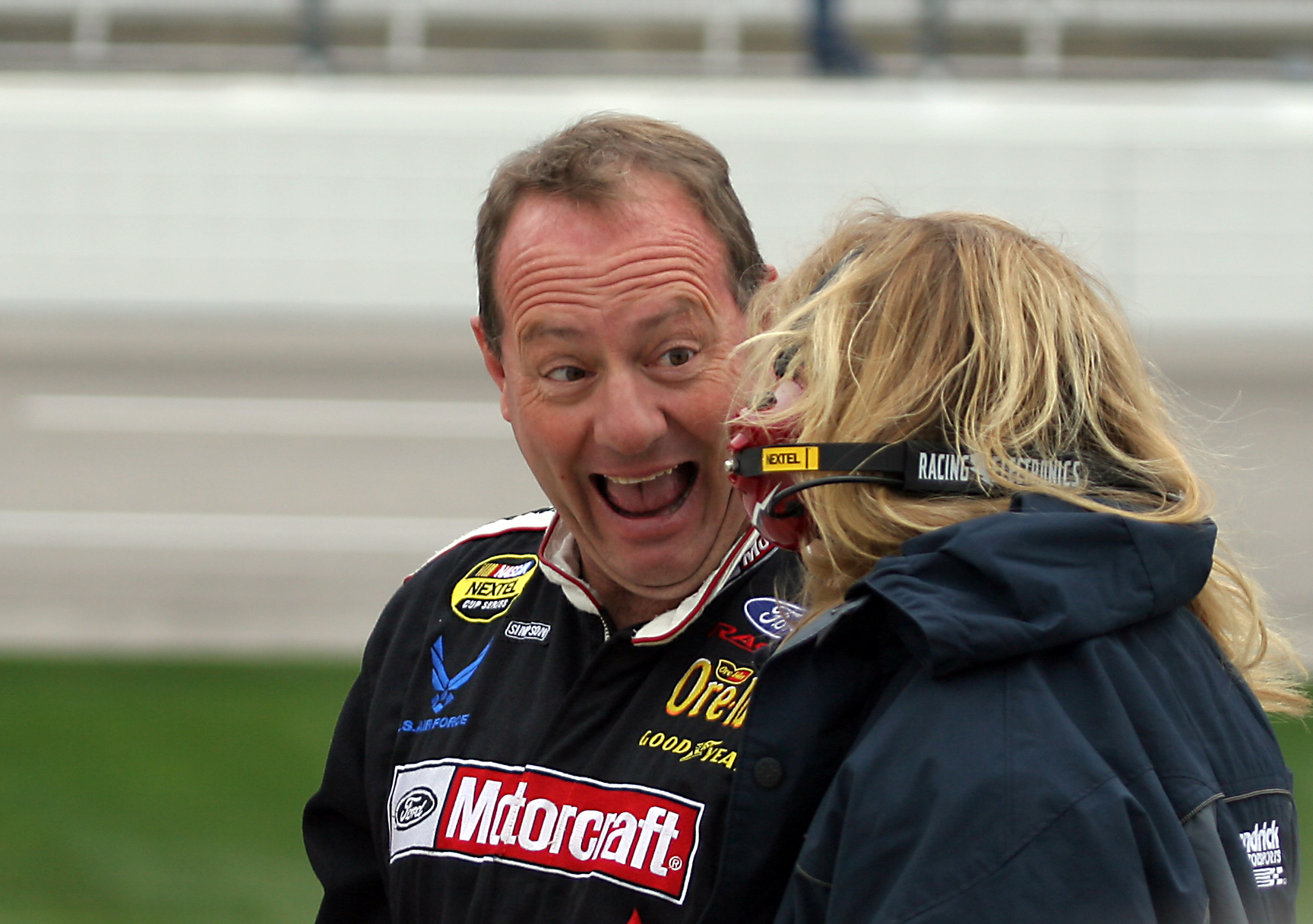
Ken Schrader was the Daytona 500 pole winner for three consecutive years (1988–1990).

# wins	Driver	Years won
3 consecutive	Fireball Roberts	1961–1963
3 consecutive	Bill Elliott	1985–1987
3 consecutive	Ken Schrader	1988–1990
2 consecutive	Buddy Baker	1979–1980
2 consecutive	Chase Elliott	2016–2017

=== Family Daytona 500 pole winner combos ===
Family	Names	Years won
Allison's	Bobby Allison	1981
Allison's	Donnie Allison	1975, 1977
Allison's	Davey Allison	1991
Earnhardt's	Dale Earnhardt	1996
Earnhardt's	Dale Earnhardt Jr.	2011
Petty's	Richard Petty	1966
Petty's	Kyle Petty	1993
Elliott's	Bill Elliott	1985–87, 2001
Elliott's	Chase Elliott	2016–2017

=== Daytona 500 winners from pole position ===
Year	Winners
1962	Fireball Roberts
1966	Richard Petty
1968	Cale Yarborough
1980	Buddy Baker
1984	Cale Yarborough
1985	Bill Elliott
1987	Bill Elliott
1999	Jeff Gordon
2000	Dale Jarrett

== Television broadcasts ==
The very first NASCAR races to ever be shown on television were broadcast by CBS. In February 1960, CBS sent a "skeleton" production crew to Daytona Beach, Florida and the Daytona International Speedway to cover the Daytona 500's Twin 100 qualifying races on February 12, 1960. The production crew also stayed to broadcast portions of the Daytona 500 itself, two days later. The event was hosted by John S. Palmer. CBS would continue to broadcast portions of races for the next 18 years, along with ABC and NBC.

== See also ==
- Daytona 500
- Gatorade Duels
