= 1968 World 600 =

Auto race held at Charlotte Motor Speedway in 1968

Race details
- Race 21 of 54 in the 1968 NASCAR Grand National Series season
- Layout of Charlotte Motor Speedway
- Date: May 26, 1968
- Official name: World 600
- Location: Charlotte Motor Speedway, Concord, North Carolina
- Course: Permanent racing facility
- Course length: 1.500 miles (2.414 km)
- Distance: 255 laps, 382.500 mi (615.574 km)
- Scheduled distance: 400 laps, 600 mi (965.606 km)
- Weather: Chilly with temperatures of 68 °F (20 °C); wind speeds of 13 miles per hour (21 km/h)
- Average speed: 104.207 mph (167.705 km/h)
- Attendance: 60,000

Pole position
Driver	Donnie Allison	Banjo Matthews

Most laps led
Driver	Buddy Baker	Ray Fox
- Laps: 98

Winner
No. 3	Buddy Baker	Ray Fox

The 1968 World 600, the ninth running of the event, was a NASCAR Grand National Series event that took place on May 26, 1968, at Charlotte Motor Speedway in Concord, North Carolina.

== Background ==
Charlotte Motor Speedway, a 1.5-mile (2.4 km) quad-oval track located in Concord, North Carolina, was the location for the race. The track's turns were banked at twenty-four degrees, while the front stretch, the location of the finish line, was five degrees. The back stretch, opposite of the front, also had a five degree banking. During the 1968 season, Charlotte Motor Speedway hosted the NASCAR Grand National Series twice, with the other race being the National 500.

Designed and built by Bruton Smith and partner and driver Curtis Turner in 1959, the first World 600 NASCAR race was held at the 1.5 mi (2.4 km) speedway on June 19, 1960. On December 8, 1961, the speedway filed bankruptcy notice. Judge J.B. Craven of US District Court for Western North Carolina reorganized it under Chapter 10 of the Bankruptcy Act; Judge Craven appointed Robert "Red" Robinson as the track's trustee until March 1962. At that point, a committee of major stockholders in the speedway was assembled, headed by A.C. Goines and furniture store owner Richard Howard. Goines, Howard, and Robinson worked to secure loans and other monies to keep the speedway afloat.

By April 1963 some $750,000 was paid to twenty secured creditors and the track emerged from bankruptcy; Judge Craven appointed Goines as speedway president and Howard as assistant general manager of the speedway, handling its day-to-day operations. By 1964 Howard become the track's general manager, and on June 1, 1967, the speedway's mortgage was paid in full; a public burning of the mortgage was held at the speedway two weeks later.

Smith departed from the speedway in 1962 to pursue other business interests, primarily in banking and auto dealerships from his new home of Rockford, IL. He became quite successful and began buying out shares of stock in the speedway. By 1974 Smith was more heavily involved in the speedway, to where Richard Howard by 1975 stated, "I haven't been running the speedway. It's being run from Illinois." In 1975 Smith had become the majority stockholder, regaining control of its day-to-day operations. Smith hired H.A. "Humpy" Wheeler as general manager in October 1975, and on January 29, 1976, Richard Howard resigned as president and GM of the speedway.

== Qualifying ==
Grid	No.	Driver	Manufacturer	Owner
1	27	Donnie Allison	'68 Ford	Banjo Matthews
2	98	LeeRoy Yarbrough	'68 Mercury	Junior Johnson
3	21	Cale Yarborough	'68 Mercury	Wood Brothers
4	17	David Pearson	'68 Ford	Holman-Moody Racing
5	29	Bobby Allison	'68 Ford	Bondy Long
6	43	Richard Petty	'68 Plymouth	Petty Enterprises
7	16	Tiny Lund	'68 Mercury	Bud Moore
8	14	Curtis Turner	'68 Plymouth	Tom Friedkin
9	22	Darel Dieringer	'68 Plymouth	Mario Rossi
10	6	Charlie Glotzbach	'68 Dodge	Cotton Owens
11	99	Paul Goldsmith	'68 Dodge	Ray Nichels
12	3	Buddy Baker	'68 Dodge	Ray Fox
13	15	Jerry Grant	'68 Plymouth	Tom Friedkin
14	71	Bobby Isaac	'68 Dodge	Nord Krauskopf
15	1	Bud Moore	'68 Dodge	A.J. King
16	4	John Sears	'67 Ford	L.G. DeWitt
17	37	Sam McQuagg	'67 Dodge	Nord Krauskopf
18	49	G.C. Spencer	'67 Plymouth	G.C. Spencer
19	90	Sonny Hutchins	'67 Ford	Junie Donlavey
20	64	Elmo Langley	'66 Ford	Elmo Langley / Henry Woodfield
21	48	James Hylton	'67 Dodge	James Hylton
22	2	Paul Lewis	'67 Dodge	Bobby Allison
23	79	Frank Warren	'66 Chevrolet	Harold Rhodes
24	39	Friday Hassler	'66 Chevrolet	Red Sharp
25	08	Don Tarr	'66 Chevrolet	E.C. Reid

== Race report ==
This race was shortened to 255 laps due to rain after being able to race for three hours and four minutes in front of 60,000 people. Rain had started to appear much earlier in the race but flagman Johnny Bruner would not wave the caution flag until the conditions got dangerous. Throughout the day, 0.32 inches of rain were reported around Charlotte Motor Speedway.

Buddy Baker would defeat Donnie Allison under the race's sixth and final caution flag. Cale Yarborough would become the last-place finisher due to a crash on lap 45. All the competitors (except for Canadian Frog Fagan) was born in the United States of America. Bobby Allison suffered an engine problem on the 229th lap of the race; forcing him to retire in 28th place. Donnie Allison won the pole position at 159.223 miles per hour or 256.245 kilometres per hour during qualifying runs while actual race speeds would reach 104.207 miles per hour or 167.705 kilometres per hour. Both of Nord Krauskopf's teams would finish in the "top ten" during this race. The top ten finishers included Buddy Baker, Donny Allison, LeeRoy Yarbrough, David Pearson, Bobby Isaac, Charlie Glotzbach, Tiny Lund, James Hylton, Curtis Turner, and Sam McQuagg.

Darel Dieringer would be a part of the race's second crash on lap 212; giving him a 32nd-place finish. Earl Balmer, Paul Lewis, and Phil Wendt would retire from NASCAR after this racing event. Prior to this race, Balmer was known as the winner of the 1966 Daytona 500 qualifying race.

Notable crew chiefs for this race included Junior Johnson, Harry Hyde, Dale Inman, Banjo Matthews and Bud Moore.

=== Timeline ===
Section reference:

- Start of race: Cale Yarborough officially started the race with the pole position.
- Lap 45: Cale Yarborough had a terminal crash, forcing him to retire from the race.
- Lap 48: Jerry Grant took over the lead from Cale Yarborough.
- Lap 49: Donnie Allison took over the lead from Jerry Grant.
- Lap 56: A troublesome valve forced G.C. Spencer off the track.
- Lap 59: Earl Balmer could not handle his vehicle, causing him to exit the race.
- Lap 70: LeeRoy Yarborough took over the lead from Donnie Allison.
- Lap 91: Paul Goldsmith fell out with engine failure while racing at reasonably fast speeds.
- Lap 101: Buddy Baker took over the lead from LeeRoy Yarborough.
- Lap 143: LeeRoy Yarborough took over the lead from Buddy Baker.
- Lap 153: An oil leak in Bob Cooper's car forced him to stop racing for the day, Donnie Allison took over the lead from LeeRoy Yarbrough.
- Lap 154: Richard Petty took over the lead from Donnie Allison.
- Lap 155: Bud Moore took over the lead from Richard Petty.
- Lap 161: Buddy Baker took over the lead from Bud Moore.
- Lap 163: Bud Moore took over the lead from Buddy Baker.
- Lap 181: Buddy Baker took over the lead from Bud Moore.
- Lap 182: Transmission problems forced Bud Moore to abandon the race.
- Lap 186: A fault ignition ended Richard Petty's hopes of the winning the race.
- Lap 190: Transmission issues managed to knock out Sonny Hutchins from the race.
- Lap 205: Bobby Allison took over the lead from Buddy Baker.
- Lap 212: Darel Dieringer had a terminal crash, forcing him to retire from the race.
- Lap 218: LeeRoy Yarbrough took over the lead from Bobby Allison.
- Lap 226: Buddy Baker took over the lead from LeeRoy Yarborough.
- Lap 229: Buddy Allison fell out with engine failure while racing at reasonably fast speeds.
- Finish: Buddy Baker was officially declared the winner of the event.

Preceded by 1968 Tidewater 250	NASCAR Grand National Season; 1968	Succeeded by 1968 Asheville 300

Preceded by 1967	World 600 races 1968	Succeeded by 1969
