= Blackie Watt =

American racing driver (born 1933)

- Born: William O. Watt; December 6, 1933 (age 92) New Alexandria, Pennsylvania, U.S.

Modified racing career
- Debut season: 1950
- Wins: 600+
- Finished last season: 2006

NASCAR Cup Series career
- 24 races run over 2 years
- Best finish: 30th (1966)
- First race: 1966 Daytona International Speedway
- Last race: 1967 Atlanta Motor Speedway
Wins	Top tens	Poles
0	9	0

William 'Blackie' Watt (born December 6, 1933) is an American retired stock car racing driver who earned over 600 feature event wins, using the same engine in his car, a 426 Hemi Dodge, for 21 years.

== Racing career ==
Watt started racing in 1950, and spent the majority of his career racing in the Modified division. He claimed track championships at Lernerville Speedway (Sarver), Motordrome Speedway (Smithtown), and Schmuckers Speedway (Latrobe), all in Pennsylvania.

Watt made 24 appearances in the NASCAR Grand National Series (predecessor of the NASCAR Cup) between 1966 and 1967, winning a qualifying race for the 1966 Firecracker 400 at Daytona.

Watt was inducted into the Northeast Dirt Modified Hall of Fame in 2013.

== Motorsports career results ==
=== NASCAR ===
(key) (Bold – Pole position awarded by qualifying time. Italics – Pole position earned by points standings or practice time. * – Most laps led.)

==== Grand National Series ====
NASCAR Grand National Series results
Year	Team	No.	Make	1	2	3	4	5	6	7	8	9	10	11	12	13	14	15	16	17	18	19	20	21	22	23	24	25	26	27	28	29	30	31	32	33	34	35	36	37	38	39	40	41	42	43	44	45	46	47	48	49	NGNC	Pts	Ref
1966	Harry Neal	93	Ford	AUG	RSD	DAY; 26	DAY	DAY; 31	CAR	BRI	ATL	HCY	CLB	GPS	BGS	NWS	MAR	DAR	LGY	MGR	MON	RCH	CLT; 9	DTS	ASH; 12	PIF; 6	SMR; 6	AWS; 16	BLV; 6	GPS	DAY; 20	ODS; 9	BRR; 10	OXF; 9	FON; 11	ISP; 16	BRI; 10	SMR; 8	NSV; 26	ATL	CLB	AWS; 12	BLV; 22	BGS	DAR; 31	HCY	RCH	HBO	MAR	NWS	CLT	CAR	30th	8518	
1967	-	45	Chevy	AUG	RSD	DAY	DAY; 22	DAY; 45	AWS	BRI	GPS	BGS																																									67th	1860	
1967	Wayne Smith	33	Chevy										ATL; 44	CLB	HCY	NWS	MAR	SVH	RCH	DAR	BLV	LGY	CLT	ASH	MGR	SMR	BIR	CAR	GPS	MGY	DAY	TRN	OXF	FDA	ISP	BRI	SMR	NSV															67th	1860	
1967	Harold Mays	33	Chevy																																				ATL; 15	BGS	CLB	SVH	DAR	HCY	RCH	BLV	HBO	MAR	NWS	CLT	CAR	AWS	67th	1860	

===== Daytona 500 =====
Year	Team	Manufacturer	Start	Finish
1966	Harry Neal	Ford	48	31
1967	Unknown	Chevrolet	50	45
