= Earl Balmer =

American racing driver (1935–2019)

- Born: Earl Franklin Balmer; December 13, 1935; Starlight, Indiana, U.S.
- Died: October 25, 2019 (aged 83); Floyds Knobs, Indiana, U.S.

NASCAR Cup Series career
- 32 races run over 6 years
- Best finish: 23rd (1965)
- First race: 1959 Western North Carolina 500 (Asheville)
- Last race: 1968 World 600 (Charlotte)
- First win: 1966 Daytona 500 Qualifier No. 2 (Daytona)
Wins	Top tens	Poles
1	10	0

Earl Franklin Balmer (December 13, 1935 – October 25, 2019) was an American racing driver who drove stock cars and motorcycles. Balmer competed in the ARCA Racing Series and NASCAR Grand National Series, winning a Daytona 500 qualifying race in 1966.

== Racing career ==
Balmer started his career at the Jeffersonville Sportsdrome in Clarksville, Indiana. After exiting the NASCAR scene, he returned to local racing, running late models at Fairgrounds Speedway.

Balmer drove in the ARCA Racing Series from 1959 to 1973, winning races at tracks like Salem Speedway, Pan American Speedway and Corpus Christi Speedway. He also won ARCA's first superspeedway race, a qualifier race for the 1964 250-mile race. During that race, Balmer led 65 of the first 67 laps before falling victim to an oil leak. Balmer's main ride for his ARCA races were Plymouth cars.

In 1964 and 1965, Balmer drove for Bud Moore Engineering, teaming with David Pearson in 1964 and Darel Dieringer in 1965. He picked up the nickname "The Mad Bomber" early in his tenure in NASCAR because of the tendency for his car to wind up anywhere on the track. With Moore, he finished second to Fred Lorenzen in the 1965 World 600.

In 1966, Balmer switched to a new ride, driving for Ray Fox. Balmer acquired the ride after he heard that Fox's previous driver, Lee Roy Yarbrough, had left the team. Balmer called Fox and the two agreed to a drive. By this time, Balmer had also acquired another moniker, "The Ice Man". In his first race with Fox, he won a Daytona 500 qualifying race, his first and only premier series victory. A last-lap pass on Fred Hutchinson secured the win for Balmer. The win was the first NASCAR win for the Dodge Charger. Later in 1966, Balmer drove for Smokey Yunick and also drove a car previously driven by Gordon Johncock. Balmer, along with Dieringer and Richard Petty, broke the Darlington speed record during qualifying for the 1966 Rebel 400.

Later in that season, Balmer had an incident during the 1966 Southern 500 race at Darlington Raceway. On lap 189 of the 364 lap race, Balmer and the car of Richard Petty touched, resulting in Balmer's car mounting the guardrail on top of Turn 1. Balmer's car spewed petrol and debris up towards the press box, causing the journalists inside to duck for cover. No one was injured, but the journalists handed a petition to track management asking to be moved to a safer location, which resulted in the press box being reinforced for the next race.

After 1966, Balmer quit racing with no factory rides available. However, when Wood Brothers Racing called him to drive in the 1967 Rebel 400, Balmer returned to NASCAR.

After ending his NASCAR career, Balmer transitioned to motorcycle racing, where he became an enduro racer.

== Personal life ==
Balmer attended Borden High School but dropped out after freshman year, earning a GED over thirty years later. He later lived in New Albany, Indiana, where he married and had kids. After his NASCAR career, Balmer worked as a bricklayer.
