= 1966 Smoky Mountain 200 =

Auto race held at Smoky Mountain Raceway in 1966

Race details
- Race 35 of 49 in the 1966 NASCAR Grand National Series season
- Date: July 28, 1966; 60 years ago
- Official name: Smoky Mountain 200
- Location: Smoky Mountain Raceway, Maryville, Tennessee
- Course: Permanent racing facility
- Course length: 0.500 miles (0.745 km)
- Distance: 200 laps, 100 mi (80 km)
- Weather: Extremely hot with temperatures of 93 °F (34 °C); wind speeds of 8.9 miles per hour (14.3 km/h)
- Average speed: 69.822 mph (112.368 km/h)
- Attendance: 6,000

Pole position
Driver	Buddy Baker	Emory Gilliam

Most laps led
Driver	David Pearson	Cotton Owens
- Laps: 100

Winner
No. 1	Paul Lewis	Paul Lewis

Television in the United States
- Network: untelevised
- Announcers: none

The 1966 Smoky Mountain 200 was a NASCAR Grand National Series event that was held on July 28, 1966, at Smoky Mountain Raceway in Maryville, Tennessee.

The transition to purpose-built racecars began in the early 1960s and occurred gradually over that decade. Changes made to the sport by the late 1960s brought an end to the "strictly stock" vehicles of the 1950s.

== Race report ==
This 200-lap race would last for nearly one and a half hours; six thousand spectators would watch an event where Richard Petty became the last-place finisher by virtue of steering problems on the 17th lap. Buddy Baker and David Pearson would dominate much of the race. Paul Lewis would go on to defeat Pearson by a time of two seconds; making it his only career victory in a car of his own ownership after starting two cars away from last in this unlikely triumph. Lewis would dominate the final 64 laps of this event and would never let go. Unfortunately, Lewis was never able to record another victory in his NASCAR Cup Series career after the end of this event.

Out of the 29 drivers on the grid, there was only one foreigner in the event - Canadian-born Don Biederman. Buzz Gregory became the lowest-finishing driver to finish the race; he was 84 laps behind the lead lap drivers. The number of cautions for this event was never recorded. Throughout the race, the average speed of the vehicles was 69.822 miles per hour (112.368 km/h). Notable crew chiefs that would make an appearance at this race were Herman Beam, Bob Cooper, Clair Jackson, Frankie Scott, Dale Inman and Bud Hartje.

1975 & 1976 Late Model Sportsman Champion and longtime Sportsman and Busch Series Veteran L.D. Ottinger made his Grand National debut; he would not return to the Cup Series until 1973. Ottinger made his last Cup race in 1984, driving for Rod Benfield and the #98 Levi Garrett team, replacing the recently released Joe Ruttman for two races. He finished 21st and 22nd at Charlotte and North Wilkesboro Speedway, respectively.

Buddy Baker clinched the pole position for this racing event with his top speed of 77.821 miles per hour (125.241 km/h) during solo qualifying sessions. Individual race earnings for each driver ranged from $1,000 ($9,923 when adjusted for inflation) to $100 ($992 when adjusted for inflation). The total prize purse offered for this NASCAR event was $4,940 ($49,020 when adjusted for inflation).

=== Qualifying ===
Grid	No.	Driver	Manufacturer	Owner
1	00	Buddy Baker	'65 Dodge	Emory Gilliam
2	19	J.T. Putney	'66 Chevrolet	J.T. Putney
3	6	David Pearson	'65 Dodge	Cotton Owens
4	48	James Hylton	'65 Dodge	Bud Hartje
5	64	Elmo Langley	'64 Ford	Elmo Langley / Henry Woodfield
6	20	Clyde Lynn	'64 Ford	Clyde Lynn
7	43	Richard Petty	'66 Plymouth	Petty Enterprises
8	4	John Sears	'64 Ford	L.G. DeWitt
9	18	Stick Elliott	'66 Chevrolet	Toy Bolton
10	93	Blackie Watt	'64 Ford	Harry Neal
11	02	Doug Cooper	'65 Plymouth	Bob Cooper
12	11	Ned Jarrett	'64 Ford	Bernard Alvarez
13	97	Henley Gray	'66 Ford	Henley Gray
14	87	Buck Baker	'66 Oldsmobile	Buck Baker
15	86	Darel Dieringer	'64 Dodge	Buck Baker
16	06	Jack Lawrence	'64 Mercury	John McCarthy
17	73	Buzz Gregory	'64 Ford	Joan Petre
18	2	Bobby Allison	'64 Ford	Donald Brackins
19	88	Neil Castles	'66 Chevrolet	Buck Baker
20	74	Earl Brooks	'64 Ford	Gene Black
21	35	L.T. Ottinger	'65 Oldsmobile	Ken Carpenter
22	70	J.D. McDuffie	'64 Ford	J. D. McDuffie
23	61	Joel Davis	'66 Chevrolet	Toy Bolton
24	3	Buddy Arrington	'65 Dodge	Ray Fox
25	25	Jabe Thomas	'64 Ford	Jeff Handy
26	53	Jimmy Helms	'64 Ford	David Warren
27	1	Paul Lewis	'65 Plymouth	Paul Lewis
28	34	Wendell Scott	'65 Ford	Wendell Scott
29	94	Don Biederman	'64 Chevrolet	Ron Stotten

== Top 20 finishers ==
Pos	No.	Driver	Manufacturer	Laps	Laps led	Time/Status
1	1	Paul Lewis	Plymouth	200	64	1:25:56
2	6	David Pearson	Dodge	200	100	+2 seconds
3	19	J.T. Putney	Chevrolet	199	0	+1 lap
4	02	Doug Cooper	Plymouth	195	0	+5 laps
5	2	Bobby Allison	Chevrolet	194	0	+6 laps
6	48	James Hylton	Dodge	194	0	+6 laps
7	4	John Sears	Ford	192	0	+8 laps
8	93	Blackie Watt	Ford	191	0	+9 laps
9	97	Henley Gray	Ford	190	0	+10 laps
10	06	Jack Lawrence	Mercury	189	0	+11 laps
11	87	Buck Baker	Oldsmobile	188	0	+12 laps
12	34	Wendell Scott	Ford	188	0	+12 laps
13	88	Neil Castles	Chevrolet	188	0	+12 laps
14	18	Stick Elliott	Chevrolet	183	0	+17 laps
15	74	Earl Brooks	Ford	183	0	+17 laps
16	53	Jimmy Helms	Ford	175	0	+25 laps
17	61	Joel Davis	Chevrolet	171	0	+29 laps
18	20	Clyde Lynn	Ford	171	0	+29 laps
19	70	J.D. McDuffie	Ford	157	0	+43 laps
20	94	Don Biederman	Chevrolet	155	0	+45 laps

== Timeline ==
Section reference:

- Start of race: Buddy Baker started the race with the pole position.
- Lap 17: Richard Petty failed to control his steering in a safe manner.
- Lap 18: David Pearson takes over the lead from Buddy Baker.
- Lap 32: L.D. Ottinger noticed that his fender fell off his vehicle.
- Lap 34: Jabe Thomas developed engine problems, forcing him to exit from the race.
- Lap 78: Ned Jarrett overheated his race car, causing him to leave the race prematurely.
- Lap 87: Buddy Arrington's fuel pump stopped acting properly, bringing his day to an end with a 24th-place finish.
- Lap 116: Buddy Baker takes over the lead from David Pearson.
- Lap 134: Buddy Baker had a terminal crash, forcing him to withdraw from the event.
- Lap 135: David Pearson takes over the lead from Buddy Baker.
- Lap 137: Paul Lewis takes over the lead from David Pearson.
- Finish: Paul Lewis was officially declared the winner of the event.

Preceded by 1966 Volunteer 500	NASCAR Grand National Series season 1966	Succeeded by 1966 Nashville 400
