= Bob Derrington =

American racecar driver (1930–2011)

- Born: November 22, 1930; Houston, Texas, U.S.
- Died: October 14, 2011 (aged 80)

NASCAR Cup Series career
- 80 races run over 3 years
- Best finish: 6th (1965)
- First race: 1964 World 600 (Charlotte Motor Speedway)
- Last race: 1966 Southern 500 (Darlington Speedway)
Wins	Top tens	Poles
0	22	0

Bob Derrington (November 22, 1930 – October 14, 2011) was an American NASCAR Grand National Series race car driver whose career spanned from 1964 to 1966.

== Career ==
Derrington's average start was 20th place while his average finish was 15th. He also earned three finishes in the "top-five" and raced a distance of 9,856.2 miles (15,862.0 km) - the equivalent of 13,427 laps.

However, Derrington only managed to lead a single lap in his entire career and earned a meager $26,530 ($263,259.23 when adjusted for inflation). Derrington had an 80-race winless streak during his NASCAR career. Finishing an average of 15th place, he managed to qualify in 20th place during an average qualifying session; making his finishes better on average than his starts.

During his career, Derrington was caught by NASCAR officials for having a 23-gallon tank in his vehicle instead of the mandated 22-gallon tank. His vehicle had to go to a nearby welding shop to make the fuel tank conform to the NASCAR standards at that time.
