= 1966 Columbia 200 =

Auto race held at Columbia Speedway in 1966

Race details
- Race 10 of 49 in the 1966 NASCAR Grand National Series season
- Date: April 7, 1966; 59 years ago
- Official name: Columbia 200
- Location: Columbia Speedway, Columbia, South Carolina
- Course: Permanent racing facility
- Course length: 0.500 miles (0.805 km)
- Distance: 200 laps, 100 mi (160 km)
- Weather: Mild with temperatures of 70 °F (21 °C); wind speeds of 25.1 miles per hour (40.4 km/h)
- Average speed: 65.574 miles per hour (105.531 km/h)
- Attendance: 11,000

Pole position
Driver	Tom Pistone	Tom Pistone

Most laps led
Driver	David Pearson	Cotton Owens
- Laps: 130

Winner
No. 6	David Pearson	Cotton Owens

Television in the United States
- Network: untelevised
- Announcers: none

The 1966 Columbia 200 was a NASCAR Grand National Series event that was held on April 7, 1966, at Columbia Speedway in Columbia, South Carolina.

== Background ==
Columbia Speedway was an oval racetrack located in Cayce, a suburb of Columbia, South Carolina. It was the site of auto races for NASCAR's top series from 1951 through 1971. For most of its history, the racing surface was dirt. The races in April and August 1970 were two of the final three Grand National Series races ever held on a dirt track.

The track was paved before hosting its last two Grand National races in 1971.

While Columbia Speedway was shut down to cars in 1979, noise complaints, it reopened as a velodrome in 2001.

== Race report ==
Two hundred laps were done on a dirt track spanning 0.500 miles (0.805 km). The race took an hour and thirty-one minutes to decide that David Pearson defeated Paul Goldsmith by a margin of one car length (less than one lap). Eleven thousand people attended this race which had eight cautions for 19 laps.

All 24 competitors were born in the United States of America and were male. Buck Baker and Tiny Lund failed to collect any winnings from this race. This race was dominated by Chevrolet and Ford entries. Speeds for the racing weekend reached 72.202 miles per hour (116.198 km/h) in qualifying (achieved by Tom Pistone) and 65.747 miles per hour (105.810 km/h) during the actual race. The speeds were equalized by the dirt surface; which slowed down the stock cars during the 1950s and 1960s but brought exciting racing for those who were not quite ready for the blistering fast pace of asphalt racing.

Buddy Baker was involved in the event's only crash at lap 95. Frankie Scott and Dale Inman were the two crew chiefs that were the most notable during the race.

The transition to purpose-built racecars began in the early 1960s and occurred gradually over that decade. Changes made to the sport by the late 1960s brought an end to the "strictly stock" vehicles of the 1950s.

=== Qualifying ===
Grid	No.	Driver	Manufacturer	Owner
1	59	Tom Pistone	'64 Ford	Tom Pistone
2	19	J.T. Putney	'66 Chevrolet	J.T. Putney
3	88	Buddy Baker	'66 Chevrolet	Buck Baker
4	04	John Sears	'64 Ford	L.G. DeWitt
5	18	Stick Elliott	'66 Chevrolet	Toy Bolton
6	6	David Pearson	'64 Dodge	Cotton Owens
7	87	Buck Baker	'66 Oldsmobile	Buck Baker
8	97	Henley Gray	'65 Ford	Henley Gray
9	02	Paul Goldsmith	'65 Plymouth	Bob Cooper
10	55	Tiny Lund	'64 Ford	Lyle Stelter
11	70	J.D. McDuffie	'64 Ford	J.D. McDuffie
12	77	Joel Davis	'65 Plymouth	Harold Mays
13	64	Elmo Langley	'64 Ford	Elmo Langley / Henry Woodfield
14	66	Wayne Woodward	'66 Chevrolet	Wayne Woodward
15	61	Toy Bolton	'66 Chevrolet	Toy Bolton

== Finishing order ==
1. David Pearson (No. 6)
2. Paul Goldsmith (No. 02)
3. Tom Pistone (No. 59)
4. J.T. Putney (No. 19)
5. John Sears (No. 04)
6. Richard Petty (No. 43)
7. Roy Tyner (No. 9)
8. Toy Bolton (No. 61)
9. Wendell Scott (No. 34)
10. Henley Gray (No. 97)
11. Wayne Woodward (No. 66)
12. Clyde Lynn (No. 20)
13. Gene Cline (No. 95)
14. J.D. McDuffie (No. 70)
15. Neil Castles (No. 86)
16. Joel Davis (No. 77)
17. Jim Tatum (No. 45)
18. Stick Elliott* (No. 18)
19. Jimmy Helms* (No. 53)
20. Buddy Baker* (No. 88)
21. Bill Seifert* (No. 74)
22. Elmo Langley* (No. 64)
23. Buck Baker* (No. 87)
24. Tiny Lund* (No. 55)

* Driver failed to finish race

== Timeline ==
Section reference:

- Start of race: Tim Pistone started the race with the pole position.
- Lap 13: Tiny Lund's overheating vehicle apparently sealed his last-place finish in this event.
- Lap 16: The water pump on Buck Baker's vehicle developed problems, causing him to leave the race early.
- Lap 54: David Pearson took over the lead from Tom Pistone.
- Lap 63: Bill Seifert's brakes acted up; Elmo Langley managed to blow the engine of his vehicle.
- Lap 85: J.T. Putney took over the lead from David Pearson.
- Lap 86: Paul Goldsmith took over the lead from J.T. Putney.
- Lap 95: Buddy Baker had a terminal crash, ending his hopes of winning the race.
- Lap 102: David Pearson took over the lead from Paul Goldsmith.
- Lap 123: Jimmy Helms' vehicle ended up overheating, causing him to withdraw from the event.
- Lap 161: Stick Elliott's engine became problematic, forcing him to leave the race.
- Finish: David Pearson was officially declared the winner of the event.

Preceded by 1966 Hickory 250	NASCAR Grand National Series Season; 1966	Succeeded by 1966 Greenville 200
