= Ken Spikes =

American racecar driver (1935–2009)

Kenneth "Ken" L. Spikes
- Born: February 2, 1935; Cordele, Georgia, U.S.
- Died: November 19, 2009 (aged 74); Albany, Georgia, U.S.

NASCAR Cup Series career
- 16 races run over 3 years
- Best finish: 40th (1964)
- First race: 1964 Atlanta 500 (Atlanta)
- Last race: 1970 Talladega 500 (Talladega)
Wins	Top tens	Poles
0	1	0

Kenneth L. Spikes (February 2, 1935 – November 16, 2009) was an American driver for the NASCAR Grand National Series who drove from 1964 to 1970. Before he was in NASCAR, Spikes served in the United States Air Force. During his spare time, Spikes would devote his time to operating a company specializing in heavy equipment.

== Career ==
Spikes officially drove in 1755 laps of professional stock car racing action; which is the equivalent of 2,695.3 miles (4,337.7 km). The primary manufacturers for this driver were Chevrolet, Pontiac, and Dodge. While he enjoyed an average start of 31st place; racing skills developed on the track allowed him to improve on his unimpressive starts with an average finish of 26th place. Spikes would earn a grand total of $8,235 from his entire NASCAR driving career ($68,272.17 when adjusted for inflation). He would fail to qualify for one race only: the 1967 National 500 set in prestigious Charlotte Motor Speedway (Concord, North Carolina).

After retiring from racing, Spikes devoted his life to religion and became a minister. As a faithful church-goer at the Listonia Christian Mission, Spikes knew that he would be attracted to the ministry and became Reverend Ken Spikes. He died at Phoebe Putney Memorial Hospital in Albany, Georgia; leaving behind his wife Miriam (née Dean) along with four daughters, six grandchildren, and five great-grandchildren.

== Titles, honours and awards ==
=== Shorthand titles ===
- February 2, 1935 – [Exact date unknown]: Mr. Kenneth Spikes
- [Exact date unknown] – November 16, 2009: Reverend Kenneth Spikes
