= 1966 Southern 500 =

Auto race held at Darlington Raceway in 1966

Coordinates: 34°17′50.5″N 79°54′18.4″W

Race details
- Race 42 of 59 in the 1966 NASCAR Grand National Series season
- 1966 Southern 500 program cover
- Date: September 5, 1966
- Official name: Southern 500
- Location: Darlington Raceway, Darlington, South Carolina
- Course: Permanent racing facility
- Course length: 1.375 miles (2.212 km)
- Distance: 364 laps, 500.5 mi (805.4 km)
- Weather: Very hot with temperatures of 89.1 °F (31.7 °C); wind speeds of 10.1 miles per hour (16.3 km/h)
- Average speed: 114.830 miles per hour (184.801 km/h)
- Attendance: 28,000

Pole position
| Driver | LeeRoy Yarbrough | Jon Thorne |

Most laps led
| Driver | Richard Petty | Petty Enterprises |
- Laps: 131

Winner
| No. 16 | Darel Dieringer | Bud Moore |

Television in the United States
- Network: untelevised
- Announcers: none

The 1966 Southern 500, the 17th running of the event, was a NASCAR Grand National Series event that was held on September 5, 1966, at Darlington Raceway in Darlington, South Carolina.

The transition to purpose-built racecars began in the early 1960s and occurred gradually over that decade. Changes made to the sport by the late 1960s brought an end to the "strictly stock" vehicles of the 1950s.

== Background ==
Darlington Raceway, nicknamed by many NASCAR fans and drivers as "The Lady in Black" or "The Track Too Tough to Tame" and advertised as a "NASCAR Tradition", is a race track built for NASCAR racing located near Darlington, South Carolina. It is of a unique, somewhat egg-shaped design, an oval with the ends of very different configurations, a condition which supposedly arose from the proximity of one end of the track to a minnow pond the owner refused to relocate. This situation makes it very challenging for the crews to set up their cars' handling in a way that will be effective at both ends.

The track is a four-turn 1.366 miles (2.198 km) oval. The track's first two turns are banked at twenty-five degrees, while the final two turns are banked two degrees lower at twenty-three degrees. The front stretch (the location of the finish line) and the back stretch is banked at six degrees. Darlington Raceway can seat up to 60,000 people.

Darlington has something of a legendary quality among drivers and older fans; this is probably due to its long track length relative to other NASCAR speedways of its era and hence the first venue where many of them became cognizant of the truly high speeds that stock cars could achieve on a long track. The track allegedly earned the moniker The Lady in Black because the night before the race the track maintenance crew would cover the entire track with fresh asphalt sealant, in the early years of the speedway, thus making the racing surface dark black. Darlington is also known as "The Track Too Tough to Tame" because drivers can run lap after lap without a problem and then bounce off of the wall the following lap. Racers will frequently explain that they have to race the racetrack, not their competition. Drivers hitting the wall are considered to have received their "Darlington Stripe" thanks to the missing paint on the right side of the car.

== Race report ==
A field of 44 drivers competed for a total purse of $67,960 ($674,372 when adjusted for inflation). The media was displeased with the treatment that they received from NASCAR after a crash by Earl Balmer almost wiped out the press box. As a result, they petitioned the president of the track, Bob Colvin, threatening not to be responsible for any loss of life should another terminal crash injure or kill a member of the media.

LeeRoy Yarbrough won the pole position with a qualifying speed of 140.058 miles per hour (225.402 km/h). Darel Dieringer passed Richard Petty with seven laps to go to win. There were 28 lead changes and 8 cautions for 80 laps, and the race lasted four hours and twenty-one minutes. This race was scheduled for 364 laps on a paved oval track spanning 1.375 miles (2.213 km), for a total distance of 500.5 miles (805.5 km). The average race speed was 114.830 miles per hour (184.801 km/h). Twelve engine failures were recorded during the course of the race along with two terminal crashes along with several other reasons that drivers failed to finish the race. By modern standards, this was considered to be a competitive Southern 500; with 6 laps separating the top ten along with the leaders on the same lap.

Driveshaft problems forced Jimmy Helms out of the race on lap 1 while transmission issues forced Jerry Grant to leave on lap 7. Doug Cooper's vehicle developed engine problems on lap 16. Buck Baker had similar problems on lap 22 and Wayne Smith's vehicle had a faulty engine on lap 26. Buddy Arrington had a good race until lap 50 when his engine stopped working. Engine problems would claim the vehicles on Bobby Johns on lap 56. Bobby Allison would retire from the race on lap 71 due to engine problems.

Valve issues would take out Stick Elliott on lap 78. Earl Brooks would have a faulty engine lap 120 while Blackie Watt had similar issues on lap 172. Bob Derrington and Eddie MacDonald made their final NASCAR appearances. Earl Balmer's ride with the guardrail would result in his accident on lap 185; where he would end up with a 30th-place finish. Tiny Lund would have engine failure on lap 248 while Frank Warren had the same issue on lap 305. Paul Goldsmith pulled out of the race due to engine problems on lap 345. The final DNF of the race would be Curtis Turner's crash on lap 348.

Notable crew chiefs to participate in the race were Harry Hyde, Bud Hartje, Dale Inman, Frankie Scott, Shorty Johns, and Herman Beam.

=== Qualifying ===
| Grid | No. | Driver | Manufacturer | Owner |
|---|---|---|---|---|
| 1 | 12 | LeeRoy Yarbrough | '66 Dodge | Jon Thorne |
| 2 | 43 | Richard Petty | '66 Plymouth | Petty Enterprises |
| 3 | 16 | Darel Dieringer | '66 Mercury | Bud Moore |
| 4 | 99 | Paul Goldsmith | '66 Plymouth | Ray Nichels |
| 5 | 98 | Sam McQuagg | '66 Dodge | Ray Nichels |
| 6 | 71 | Earl Balmer | '65 Dodge | Nord Krauskopf |
| 7 | 21 | Cale Yarborough | '66 Ford | Wood Brothers |
| 8 | 3 | Buddy Baker | '65 Dodge | Ray Fox |
| 9 | 28 | Fred Lorenzen | '66 Ford | Holman-Moody Racing |
| 10 | 29 | Dick Hutcherson | '65 Ford | Holman-Moody Racing |
| 11 | 14 | Jim Paschal | '66 Plymouth | Tom Friedkin |
| 12 | 26 | Curtis Turner | '66 Ford | Junior Johnson |
| 13 | 6 | David Pearson | '66 Dodge | Cotton Owens |
| 14 | 42 | Marvin Panch | '66 Plymouth | Petty Enterprises |
| 15 | 04 | Jerry Grant | '65 Plymouth | Tom Friedkin |
| 16 | 48 | James Hylton | '65 Dodge | Bud Hartje |
| 17 | 7 | Bobby Johns | '66 Chevrolet | Shorty Johns |
| 18 | 49 | G.C. Spencer | '66 Plymouth | G.C. Spencer |
| 19 | 36 | H.B. Bailey | '65 Pontiac | H.B. Bailey |
| 20 | 11 | Ned Jarrett | '66 Ford | Bernard Alvarez |

== Finishing order ==
Section reference:

1. Darel Dieringer†
2. Richard Petty
3. David Pearson†
4. Marvin Panch†
5. Fred Lorenzen†
6. Jim Paschal†
7. Dick Hutcherson†
8. LeeRoy Yarbrough†
9. Sam McQuagg†
10. G.C. Spencer†
11. Cale Yarborough†
12. Paul Lewis
13. Ned Jarrett
14. Curtis Turner*†
15. James Hylton†
16. Paul Goldsmith*†
17. H. B. Bailey†
18. Elmo Langley†
19. J.T. Putney†
20. John Sears†
21. Larry Hess†
22. Henley Gray
23. Neil Castles†
24. Wendell Scott†
25. Bill Champion†
26. Frank Warren
27. Bunkie Blackburn†
28. Tiny Lund*†
29. Friday Hassler*†
30. Earl Balmer*†
31. Blackie Watt*
32. Earl Brooks*†
33. Buddy Baker*†
34. Eddie MacDonald*†
35. Stick Elliott*†
36. Bobby Allison*†
37. Bobby Johns*†
38. Bob Derrington*†
39. Buddy Arrington*†
40. Wayne Smith*
41. Buck Baker*†
42. Doug Cooper*†
43. Jerry Grant*†
44. Jimmy Helms*

† signifies that the driver is known to be deceased
* Driver failed to finish race

| Preceded by 1966 Myers Brothers 250 | NASCAR Grand National Series season 1966 | Succeeded by 1966 Buddy Shuman 250 |
| Preceded by 1965 | Southern 500 races 1966 | Succeeded by 1967 |
