= Nichels =

American racing car builder

Nichels Engineering was an American racing car builder and team owner. It was run by crew chief / mechanic Ray Nichels.

== History ==
It competed in many genres of racing starting in Midget car racing. From there, the team progressed to Indy cars including the Indianapolis 500, land speed records, and NASCAR Grand National Series. After driver Paul Goldsmith won the 1957 Daytona Beach Road Course race, Nichels became the primary car builder for Pontiac; it took over the role for all of the Chrysler products in 1963. Nichels-built stock cars won national races in USAC, NASCAR, Automobile Racing Club of America (ARCA) and International Motor Contest Association (IMCA). The team won the 1961 and 1962 USAC Stock Car championship with Goldsmith and the 1967 championship with Don White. Nichels cars competed in two FIA World Championship races – the 1950 and 1954 Indy 500.

== Awards ==
Nichels was named to the National Midget Auto Racing Hall of Fame in 2010.

== Nichels Engineering Endurance Run (1961) ==
In 1961, Nichels, then a successful builder of race cars, prepared two production-based Pontiacs for a 24-hour endurance run at the Indianapolis Motor Speedway. He assembled six drivers, three from USAC and three from NASCAR, taking turns in both cars.

Year	Date	Participating drivers	Car	Distance covered in 24 hours	Speed
1961	Nov 20-21	(United States) Paul Goldsmith (United States) Marvin Panch (United States) Fireball Roberts (United States) Len Sutton (United States) Rodger Ward (United States) Joe Weatherly	Pontiac Catalina	2,576.241 miles	107.343 mph
1961	Nov 20-21	(United States) Paul Goldsmith (United States) Marvin Panch (United States) Fireball Roberts (United States) Len Sutton (United States) Rodger Ward (United States) Joe Weatherly	Pontiac Enforcer	2,586.878 miles	107.787 mph

== World Championship Indy 500 results ==
Season	Driver	Grid	Classification	Points	Note	Race Report
1950	Paul Russo	19	9			Report
1954	Johnny Thomson	4	Ret		Retirement	Report

== Autobiographies ==
- Conversations with a Winner - The Ray Nichels Story, William LaDow. LaDow Publishing, July 2014 (scheduled)
