= Ray Fox =

NASCAR team owner

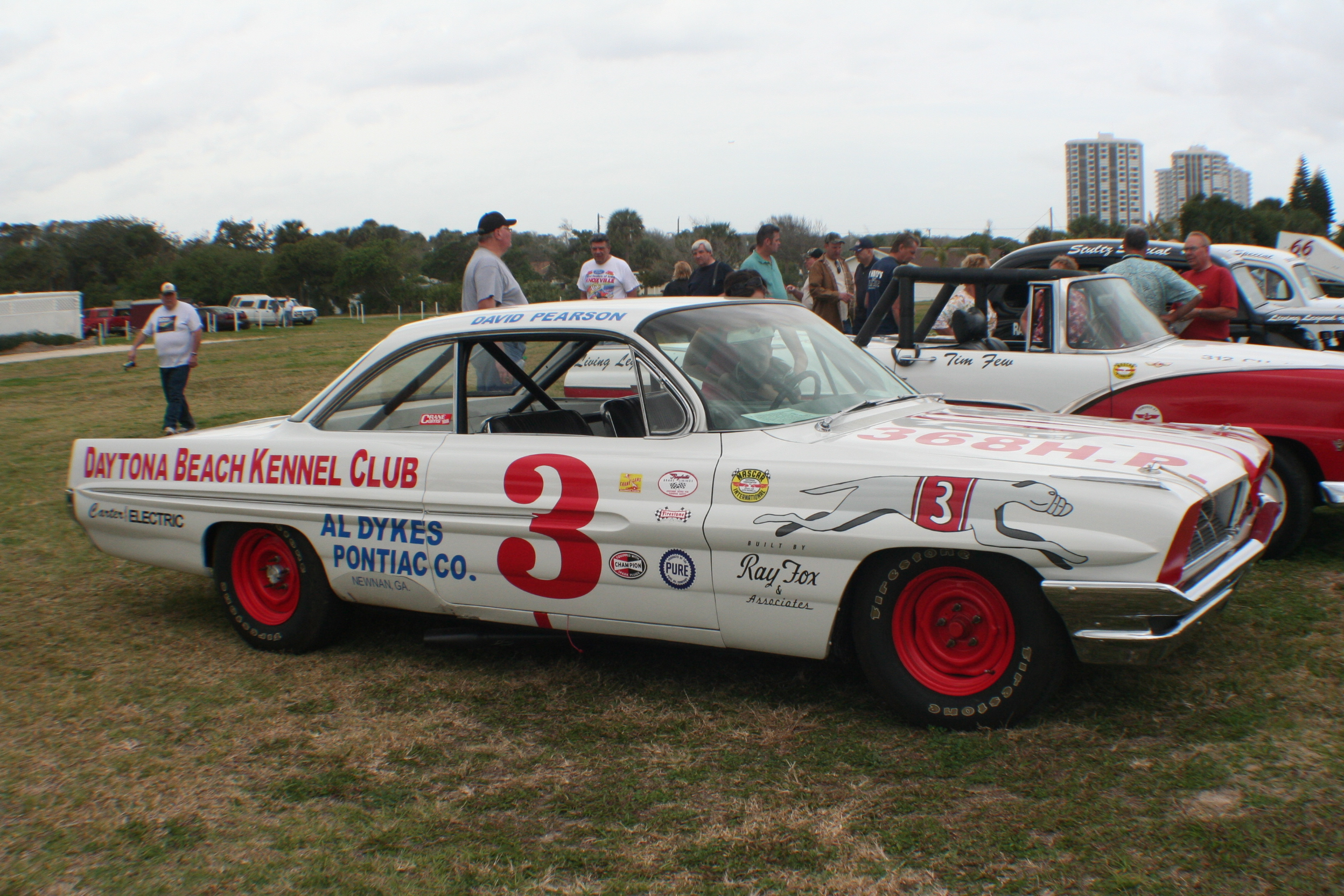
- A Fox-prepared 1961 Pontiac, driven by David Pearson
- Born: Raymond Lee Fox; May 28, 1916; Pelham, New Hampshire, U.S.
- Died: June 15, 2014 (aged 98); Daytona Beach, Florida, U.S.
- Occupations: NASCAR crew chief NASCAR Team Owner
- Years active: 1950–1972

Raymond Lee Fox Sr. (May 28, 1916 – June 15, 2014) was an American engine builder, NASCAR car owner and NASCAR engine inspector. His cars won fourteen NASCAR Grand National Series events and sixteen pole positions. He was the patriarch of NASCAR mechanics, with his son Raymond Lee Fox Jr and grandson Raymond Lee Fox III also as NASCAR mechanics. Currently, Ray Fox III and his son Justin Fox, a pit athlete, both work with Team Penske.

Fox was inducted into numerous halls of fame, including the International Motorsports Hall of Fame.

== Early life ==
Born on May 28, 1916, Fox grew up in Pelham, New Hampshire. He was first introduced to racing at the 2-mile (3.2 km) board track at Rockingham Park in nearby Salem, New Hampshire. He left the area in 1946 after serving in the United States Army. He moved to Daytona Beach, Florida to work at various automobile repair shops before he went to work for Robert Fish's Fish Carburetor. He drove Modified racecars in Florida and southern Georgia against drivers like Fireball Roberts and Marshall Teague.

== NASCAR engine builder ==
Fox built Fireball Roberts' engine for the 1955 race on the Daytona Beach Road Course. He started building the engine at 8:00 pm the night before the race and got done at 4:00 am. Roberts car qualified fourth and led every lap of the 160 lap event, winning by 1 minute and 14 seconds ahead of Tim Flock. Flock was the only other driver left on the lead lap on the 4-mile (6.4 km) circuit. NASCAR disqualified the car 24 hours after the event, for the sanctioning body found the pushrods to be 30/100 of an inch (8 mm) too short. Mechanic Red Vogt had ground the pushrods even, which was an illegal modification. Flock was awarded the victory. It was the last NASCAR race to be taken away from the winner. Subsequent rules violations have resulted in fines and point loses.

Carl Kiekhaefer hired Fox and Herb Thomas in 1956. Fox said "He hired us because we were the only ones who could outrun his cars." Kiekhaefer's cars won 22 of the first 26 races, with drivers Thomas, Buck Baker, Tim Flock, and Speedy Thompson. Fox was named the Mechanic of the Year. Fox opened his own engine shop after the season.

Car owner John Masoni approached Fox in 1960 to build a car for the 1960 Daytona 500, which would be driven by Junior Johnson. Fox built the car in seven days. The car was about 22 mph (35 km/h) slower than the Pontiac racecars in practice. While they were trying to figure out how to increase their speed, a Cotton Owens' faster Pontiac racecar passed him. Johnson noticed that when he was able to keep up with Owens' car if he followed closely behind in its slipstream. Johnson followed the Pontiac racecars in the race, pitting when they did. At the end, Bobby Johns had the only Pontiac which was competing for the win. Johnson followed Jack Smith's lapped Pontiac until Johns caught the duo and passed Johnson for the lead with 30 laps left in the race. Johns led the race until his rear window fell out with ten laps remaining. Johns recovered to finish second, 23 seconds behind Johnson. The practice of "drafting" has become a common tactic among NASCAR drivers on high speed tracks. Rookie David Pearson won three races that season in a Ray Fox-prepared Pontiac.

=== Car owner ===
Fox began owning his own car starting in 1962. Drivers to race in Fox's car include Buck Baker, Buddy Baker, Darel Dieringer, Junior Johnson, Fred Lorenzen, Fireball Roberts, Cale Yarborough, and LeeRoy Yarbrough.

In 1965, LeeRoy Yarbrough drove a Fox-prepared Dodge Coronet racecar to a new closed-course world speed record at 181.818 mph (292.608 km/h). He set the record on the second lap and he was increasing speed on the third lap when the car began smoking. NASCAR black flagged the car and Yarbrough slowed down. When he arrived in the pits, the pit crew found a bolt in the tire. The bolt easily could have caused a flat tire, which could have been deadly at high speed.

In the late 1960s, Fox bought Holman Moody's shop at the Charlotte airport.

Fox retired in 1972, selling the company to his son Ray Fox Jr.

== NASCAR inspector ==
NASCAR hired Fox to inspect engines in 1990. Fox retired for the second time in 1996. After retirement, he became the president of the Living Legends of Auto Racing.

== Honors and awards ==
Fox was inducted into the International Motorsports Hall of Fame in 2003. He is a member of the Jacksonville (Florida) Raceway Hall of Fame, National Motorsports Press Association Hall of Fame, the Oceanside Rotary Hall of Fame in 1999, and the Western Auto Mechanics Hall of Fame.

== Personal life ==
Fox's son Ray Fox Jr. was a long-time employee of Robert Yates Racing until his death. Son Ray Fox III is currently at Team Penske as the car chief on the No. 12 Ford of Ryan Blaney.

Fox was married to Mrs. Patti Fox; she helped him through his NASCAR career. Patti died in 2004. Ray often said "I miss her so much, she was the best thing that happened to me". He died on June 15, 2014, of pneumonia at Daytona Beach, Florida, aged 98.

== Biography ==
- Ray Fox...Sly in the Stock Car Forest (2006); ISBN 978-0-9724378-7-5; Carbon Press
