= Darel Dieringer =

American racing driver (1926–1989)

Darel Eugene Dieringer Sr.
- Dieringer, circa the mid-1960s
- Born: June 1, 1926; Indianapolis, Indiana, U.S.
- Died: October 28, 1989 (aged 63)
- Achievements: 1965 Daytona 500 Polesitter; 1966 Southern 500 Winner
- Awards: 1966 Grand National Series Most Popular Driver

NASCAR Cup Series career
- 181 races run over 12 years
- Best finish: 3rd (1965)
- First race: 1957 race at Daytona Beach Road Course
- Last race: 1975 National 500 (Charlotte)
- First win: 1963 Golden State 400 (Riverside)
- Last win: 1967 Gwyn Staley 400 (North Wilkesboro)
Wins	Top tens	Poles
7	79	9

Darel Eugene Dieringer Sr. (June 1, 1926 – October 28, 1989) was an American professional stock car racing driver. He ran 181 NASCAR Grand National Series races during his career, notably racing for Bud Moore Engineering and Junior Johnson & Associates. Dieringer won seven races and recorded 79 top-ten finishes.

== Racing career ==
=== Early years ===
Dieringer began to race in 1949 in and around his native Indianapolis, and had offers to race IndyCars.

=== NASCAR ===
Dieringer began to race in the NASCAR Grand National Series in 1957, running nine races for three owners and finishing in the top ten twice, the first being in only his third race. He did not finish a race in 1958, and did not run a Grand National race again until 1961, where sporadic runs throughout the season culminated in one race for Petty Enterprises late in the year. The following year, Dieringer ran at Daytona with Ray Fox, but from that point ran part-time in other lower-tier equipment.

For 1963, Dieringer teamed up with Bill Stroppe and Mario Rossi to run Mercury Marauders, as they would over the next several years. Dieringer found the checkered flag at Riverside International Raceway in the season's final race, finished outside the top-ten only five times, and finished seventh in points despite running less than half of the season's 55 races. He seemed set to go for the next season, but early season difficulties forced Stroppe to withdraw his team, leaving Dieringer to search for a new team. Taking his Marauder with him, Dieringer quickly found a home at Bud Moore Engineering, taking the pole for the summer Daytona race and winning a late-season road course race in Georgia. 1965 was the closest Dieringer ever came to running a full season in NASCAR, participating in 35 of 55 events. He ran with Moore for the premier events, winning the pole for the 1965 Daytona 500 and finishing second. Piecing together a partial schedule with several different owners for smaller races, Dieringer found moderate success with owners like Elmo Langley and finished third in overall points behind champion Ned Jarrett and Dick Hutcherson. Continuing his method of running with many teams in a season, Dieringer found success with Moore, Petty, Buck Baker, Junior Johnson and a surprising race win in Reid Shaw's No. 0 car in 1966. Dieringer's biggest triumph was that year, as he claimed the Southern 500 with the only other car on the lead lap being Richard Petty. Dieringer continued a dominating part-time schedule with Johnson in 1967, leading every lap form the pole at North Wilkesboro Speedway. He also ran three races for former driver Cotton Owens.

Past the peak of his career by 1968, Dieringer ran part-time with former crew chief Mario Rossi and his Plymouth team, scoring no wins and only one pole. He ran one race with Rossi in 1969, then retired for a while. He came back to run superspeedway races in 1975 and attempted one race in 1976 until he entered into a phase of permanent retirement.
