= NASCAR Grand National Series =

The name NASCAR Grand National Series refers to former names of the following NASCAR series:

- National-level stock car series:
  - NASCAR Cup Series (the top NASCAR series, known as NASCAR Grand National Series between 1950 and 1970, then the NASCAR Winston Cup Grand National Series between 1971 and 1986)
  - NASCAR O'Reilly Auto Parts Series (the second highest NASCAR series, known as NASCAR Busch Grand National Series between 1986 and 2003)
- Regional-level stock car series (termed as Grand National Division by NASCAR):
  - ARCA Menards Series East (known as NASCAR Busch Grand National North Series between 1987 and 1993; later formally known as NASCAR Grand National Division East Series)
  - ARCA Menards Series West (known as NASCAR Grand National West in 1970; later formally known as NASCAR Grand National Division West Series)
  - NASCAR Grand National East Series (held in 1972 and 1973)
