= Paul Dorrity =

American racing driver (born 1943)

- Born: October 19, 1943 (age 83); Modesto, California

NASCAR Cup Series career
- 8 races run over 5 years
- Best finish: 77th (1970)
- First race: 1968 Motor Trend 500 (Riverside)
- Last race: 1972 Golden State 400 (Riverside)
Wins	Top tens	Poles
0	0	0

ARCA Menards Series West career
- 58 races run over 7 years
- Best finish: 4th (1968)
- First race: 1967 Race 5 (Shasta)
- Last race: 1973 Stockton 150 (Stockton)
Wins	Top tens	Poles
0	33	0
- Statistics up to date as of September 2, 2026.

Paul Dorrity (born October 19, 1943) is an American former professional stock car racing driver. He primarily competed in the NASCAR Winston West Series, competing from 1967 to 1973.

== Racing career ==
Dorrity began competing in the NASCAR Pacific Coast Late Model Division in 1967, competing in five races and scoring two top-tens. In 1968, Dorrity competed in 19 of the season's 20 races, scoring 14 top-tens. He finished fourth in the standings. These starts included a combination race with the NASCAR Grand National Series at Riverside International Raceway, where he finished 33rd due to differential issues. In 1969, Dorrity competed in at least nine Pacific Coast Late Model races, scoring five top-tens. In the combination race at Riverside, Dorrity finished 20th in a 1967 Chevelle. In 1970, Dorrity attempted eight races in the renamed Grand National West, failing to qualify at Salem Speedway and scoring three top-tens in eight races. Despite having the oldest car in the field, Dorrity scored a 19th place finish in the first combination race at Riverside. He failed to complete a lap and finished in last in the second combination race. Dorrity made ten starts in the renamed Winston West Series in 1971, scoring six top-tens. Engine issues caused him to retire from both Riverside combination races and he failed to qualify for the combination race at Ontario Motor Speedway. Dorrity made six Winston West starts in 1972, scoring a lone top-ten at Sierra Mesa National Raceway. These included his final Winston Cup starts, where he finished 33rd and 18th in the Riverside races; he again failed to qualify at Ontario. Dorrity made his final Winston West starts in 1973, finishing 11th at Altamont Speedway and fifth in his final career start at Stockton 99 Speedway. He finished 12th in a NASCAR Late Model Sportsman National Championship race at Riverside in 1975.

== Personal life ==
Dorrity's son Paul Dorrity Jr. also competed in NASCAR, making twelve NASCAR Featherlite Southwest Tour starts between 1988 and 1992.

== Motorsports career results ==
=== NASCAR ===
(key) (Bold – Pole position awarded by qualifying time. Italics – Pole position earned by points standings or practice time. * – Most laps led.)

==== Grand National Series ====
NASCAR Grand National Series results
Year	Team	No.	Make	1	2	3	4	5	6	7	8	9	10	11	12	13	14	15	16	17	18	19	20	21	22	23	24	25	26	27	28	29	30	31	32	33	34	35	36	37	38	39	40	41	42	43	44	45	46	47	48	49	50	51	52	53	54	NGNSC	Pts	Ref
1968	Glen Dorrity	15	Chevy	MGR	MGY	RSD; 33	DAY	BRI	RCH	ATL	HCY	GPS	CLB	NWS	MAR	AUG	AWS	DAR	BLV	LGY	CLT	ASH	MGR	SMR	BIR	CAR	GPS	DAY	ISP	OXF	FDA	TRN	BRI	SMR	NSV	ATL	CLB	BGS	AWS	SBO	LGY	DAR	HCY	RCH	BLV	HBO	MAR	NWS	AUG	CLT	CAR	JFC						99th	NA	
1969	Glen Dorrity	15	Chevy	MGR	MGY	RSD; 20	DAY	DAY	DAY	CAR	AUG	BRI	ATL	CLB	HCY	GPS	RCH	NWS	MAR	AWS	DAR	BLV	LGY	CLT	MGR	SMR	MCH	KPT	GPS	NCF	DAY	DOV	TPN	TRN	BLV	BRI	NSV	SMR	ATL	MCH	SBO	BGS	AWS	DAR	HCY	RCH	TAL	CLB	MAR	NWS	CLT	SVH	AUG	CAR	JFC	MGR	TWS	NA	NA	
1970	Glen Dorrity	15	Chevy	RSD; 19	DAY	DAY	DAY	RCH	CAR	SVH	ATL	BRI	TAL	NWS	CLB	DAR	BLV	LGY	CLT	SMR	MAR	MCH	RSD; 40	HCY	KPT	GPS	DAY	AST	TPN	TRN	BRI	SMR	NSV	ATL	CLB	ONA	MCH	TAL	BGS	SBO	DAR	HCY	RCH	DOV	NCF	NWS	CLT	MAR	MGR	CAR	LGY							77th	96	
1971	Glen Dorrity	15	Chevy	RSD; 28	DAY	DAY	DAY	ONT; DNQ	RCH	CAR	HCY	BRI	ATL	CLB	GPS	SMR	NWS	MAR	DAR	SBO	TAL	ASH	KPT	CLT	DOV	MCH	RSD; 33	HOU	GPS	DAY	BRI	AST	ISP	TRN	NSV	ATL	BGS	ONA	MCH	TAL	CLB	HCY	DAR	MAR	CLT	DOV	CAR	MGR	RCH	NWS	TWS							NA	NA	

==== Winston Cup Series ====
NASCAR Winston Cup Series results
Year	Team	No.	Make	1	2	3	4	5	6	7	8	9	10	11	12	13	14	15	16	17	18	19	20	21	22	23	24	25	26	27	28	29	30	31	NWCSC	Pts	Ref
1972	Glen Dorrity	75	Chevy	RSD; 33	DAY	RCH																													84th	362	
1972	Glen Dorrity	15	Chevy				ONT; DNQ	CAR	ATL	BRI	DAR	NWS	MAR	TAL	CLT	DOV	MCH																		84th	362	
1972	Glen Dorrity	15W	Chevy															RSD; 18	TWS	DAY	BRI	TRN	ATL	TAL	MCH	NSV	DAR	RCH	DOV	MAR	NWS	CLT	CAR	TWS	84th	362	

==== Winston West Series ====
NASCAR Winston West Series results
Year	Team	No.	Make	1	2	3	4	5	6	7	8	9	10	11	12	13	14	15	16	17	18	19	20	21	22	23	24	25	26	27	28	29	30	NWWSC	Pts	Ref
1967	Glen Dorrity	15	Chevy	AMP	SGV	RSD	CPS	SHA; 8	SAL; 7	POR; 9	ASP	SGV; 14	OSS	ASP	ACF; 15	RVR	SAL	JBA	YAK	EVG	ASP	CSP												16th	1074	
1968	Glen Dorrity	15	Chevy	RSD; 18	ASP; 6	KEA; 3	VAL; 14	ASP; 13	AMP; 4		POR; 12	EVG; 7	EUG; 16	MED; 10	OSS; 7	TCR; 2	YAK; 9	EVG	EUR; 8	BKS; 8	S99; 4	CSP; 9	SGS; 6											4th	985	
1968	Glen Dorrity	15	Ford							DCS; 7																								4th	985	
1969	Glen Dorrity	15	Chevy	RSD; 20	CSF; 15	SGV; 3	SON; 12											EVG; 9	CPR; 5	POR; 9	SMS	SGV; 7	TWS											16th	455	
1969	Unknown	NA	Unknown					EVG; 0†	TCR	YAK	DCS	SAL	JBA	OSS	SGS	SON	YAK																	16th	455	
1970	Glen Dorrity	15	Chevy	RSD; 19	ASP	SGB	CSF; 19	RSD; 40	YAK	EVG	JBA	CRS; 7	OSS	SGS	MED	SAL; DNQ	SPS; 8	TCR	WSP	S99; 2	ASP	SGB; 28												16th	313	
1971	Glen Dorrity	15	Chevy	RSD; 28	ONT; DNQ	OSS	SJS; 9	CRS	S99; 18	ASP; 5	RSD; 33	SAL	SPS	SKA	USP	POR	LSP	MED	DCS	CRS; 4	OSS; 2	SGS; 16	BKS; 2	CSP; 3	EVG	IFS	YAK	SGB	TWS					17th	472	
1972	Glen Dorrity	75	Chevy	RSD; 33																														27th	415.5	
1972	Glen Dorrity	15	Chevy		ONT; DNQ	SJS; 21	S99; 12	SMN; 6	TCR	YAK	EVG																						SMN; 17	27th	415.5	
1972	Glen Dorrity	15W	Chevy									RSD; 18	MED	POR	IFS	MER	SPS	LSP	WSP	SKA	RAS	CRS	OSS	SGS	CSP	BKS	EVG	USP	YAK	POR	ASP	WCR		27th	415.5	
1973	Glen Dorrity	15	Chevy	AMP; 11	MAD	S99; 5	AUR	KFS	CBS	USP	POR	SPS	WER	SGS	CAJ	OSS	CSP	BKS	LAG	EVG	WSP	YAK	POR	AMP										NA	NA	

† - It is known Dorrity participated in this race, but his final position is unknown.
