= Frank James (racing driver) =

American racing driver (born 1938)

- Born: March 19, 1938 (age 88); Bakersfield, California, U.S.

NASCAR Cup Series career
- 8 races run over 4 years
- Best finish: 79th (1970, 1972)
- First race: 1968 Motor Trend 500 (Riverside)
- Last race: 1972 Golden State 400 (Riverside)
Wins	Top tens	Poles
0	2	0

ARCA Menards Series West career
- 61 races run over 5 years
- Best finish: 5th (1970)
- First race: 1968 Motor Trend 500 (Riverside)
- Last race: 1972 Oly 250 (Gardena)
Wins	Top tens	Poles
0	32	1
- Statistics up to date as of August 19, 2026.

Frank James (born March 19, 1938) is an American former professional stock car racing driver. He competed in the NASCAR Winston Cup Series and NASCAR Winston West Series between 1968 and 1972.

== Racing career ==
James made his NASCAR Grand National Series and NASCAR Pacific Coast Late Model Division debut simultaneously in the 1968 Motor Trend 500 at Riverside International Raceway, where he finished 26th after a differential failure. Across 16 further Pacific Coast Late Model Division starts, he scored nine top-ten finishes and a pole at Tri-City Raceway. James attempted two Pacific Coast Late Model races in 1969, failing to qualify at the California State Fairgrounds Race Track and finishing 17th at Saugus Speedway. James competed in 18 of 19 races in the renamed Grand National West in 1970, scoring ten top-tens. He ended the season fifth in the standings. In the combination races at Riverside, he finished 21st and 15th. James competed in 15 races in the renamed Winston West Series in 1971, again scoring ten top-tens. He finished 22nd in the first Riverside combination race, 21st in the combination race at Ontario Motor Speedway, and scored his first Winston Cup top-ten in the second Riverside combination race. James ran his final NASCAR season in 1972, scoring three top-tens in ten Winston West starts. In the combination races, James finished 25th and ninth in the Riverside races and failed to qualify at Ontario.

== Motorsports career results ==
=== NASCAR ===
(key) (Bold – Pole position awarded by qualifying time. Italics – Pole position earned by points standings or practice time. * – Most laps led.)

==== Grand National Series ====
NASCAR Grand National Series results
Year	Team	No.	Make	1	2	3	4	5	6	7	8	9	10	11	12	13	14	15	16	17	18	19	20	21	22	23	24	25	26	27	28	29	30	31	32	33	34	35	36	37	38	39	40	41	42	43	44	45	46	47	48	49	NGNSC	Pts	Ref
1968	Varner Brothers	00	Chevy	MGR	MGY	RSD; 26	DAY	BRI	RCH	ATL	HCY	GPS	CLB	NWS	MAR	AUG	AWS	DAR	BLV	LGY	CLT	ASH	MGR	SMR	BIR	CAR	GPS	DAY	ISP	OXF	FDA	TRN	BRI	SMR	NSV	ATL	CLB	BGS	AWS	SBO	LGY	DAR	HCY	RCH	BLV	HBO	MAR	NWS	AUG	CLT	CAR	JFC	NA	NA	
1970	Jim Calder	00	Chevy	RSD; 21	DAY	DAY	DAY	RCH	CAR	SVH	ATL	BRI	TAL	NWS	CLB	DAR	BLV	LGY	CLT	SMR	MAR	MCH	RSD; 15	HCY	KPT	GPS	DAY	AST	TPN	TRN	BRI	SMR	NSV	ATL	CLB	ONA	MCH	TAL	BGS	SBO	DAR	HCY	RCH	DOV	NCF	NWS	CLT	MAR	MGR	CAR	LGY		79th	90	
1971	Jim Calder	00	Chevy	RSD; 22	DAY	DAY	DAY																				RSD; 10	HOU	GPS	DAY	BRI	AST	ISP	TRN	NSV	ATL	BGS	ONA	MCH	TAL	CLB	HCY	DAR	MAR	CLT	DOV	CAR	MGR	RCH	NWS	TWS		NA	NA	
1971	Jim Calder	0	Chevy					ONT; 21	RCH	CAR	HCY	BRI	ATL	CLB	GPS	SMR	NWS	MAR	DAR	SBO	TAL	ASH	KPT	CLT	DOV	MCH																											NA	NA	

==== Winston Cup Series ====
NASCAR Winston Cup Series results
Year	Team	No.	Make	1	2	3	4	5	6	7	8	9	10	11	12	13	14	15	16	17	18	19	20	21	22	23	24	25	26	27	28	29	30	31	NWCSC	Pts	Ref
1972	Jim Calder	00	Chevy	RSD; 25	DAY	RCH																													79th	459.75	
1972	Jim Calder	00W	Chevy				ONT; DNQ	CAR	ATL	BRI	DAR	NWS	MAR	TAL	CLT	DOV	MCH	RSD; 9	TWS	DAY	BRI	TRN	ATL	TAL	MCH	NSV	DAR	RCH	DOV	MAR	NWS	CLT	CAR	TWS	79th	459.75	

==== Winston West Series ====
NASCAR Winston West Series results
Year	Team	No.	Make	1	2	3	4	5	6	7	8	9	10	11	12	13	14	15	16	17	18	19	20	21	22	23	24	25	26	27	28	29	30	NWWSC	Pts	Ref
1968	Varner Brothers	00	Chevy	RSD; 13	ASP; 14	KEA; 9	VAL; 11	ASP; 14	AMP; 11	DCS; 10	POR; 19	EVG; 4	EUG; 12	MED; 12	OSS; DNQ	**TCR**; 5	YAK; 4	EVG; 4	EUR	BKS; 4	S99; 7	CSP; 6	SGS											NA	NA	
1969	Frank James	0	Chevy	RSD	CSF; DNQ	SGV	SON	EVG	TCR	YAK	DCS	SAL	JBA	OSS																				NA	NA	
1969	Frank James	00	Chevy												SGS; 17	SON	YAK	EVG	CPR	POR	SMS	SGV	TWS											NA	NA	
1970	Jim Calder	00	Chevy	RSD; 21	ASP; 10	SGB; 6	CSF; 3	RSD; 15	YAK; 16	EVG; 5	JBA; 13	CRS; 13	OSS; 5	SGS; 18	MED; 18	SAL; 6	SPS; 13	TCR; 5	WSP; 10	S99; 22	ASP; 3	SGB; 7												5th	926	
1971	Jim Calder	00	Chevy	RSD; 22				CRS; 3	S99	ASP; 7	RSD; 10	SAL; 7	SPS; 14	SKA; 8	USP; 8	POR; 17	LSP; 6	MED; 7	DCS; 5	CRS	OSS	SGS	BKS; 3	CSP; 20	EVG	IFS	YAK	SGB	TWS					10th	807	
1971	Jim Calder	0	Chevy		ONT; 21	OSS	SJS																											10th	807	
1972	Jim Calder	00	Chevy	RSD; 25				SMN; 12	TCR	YAK															CSP; 12	BKS; 3	EVG; 13	USP; 17	YAK; 13	POR	ASP; 16	WCR	SMN	19th	828.5	
1972	Jim Calder	00W	Chevy		ONT; DNQ	SJS	S99				EVG; 5	RSD; 9	MED	POR	IFS	MER	SPS	LSP	WSP	SKA	RAS	CRS	OSS	SGS										19th	828.5	
