= G. T. Tallas =

American racing driver (1944–2023)

- Born: George Thalassinos Tallas; January 31, 1944; Sun Valley, California, U.S.
- Died: November 20, 2023 (aged 79)
- Cause of death: Glioblastoma

NASCAR Cup Series career
- 6 races run over 4 years
- Best finish: 93rd (1970)
- First race: 1970 Motor Trend 500 (Riverside)
- Last race: 1975 Winston Western 500 (Riverside)
Wins	Top tens	Poles
0	0	0

NASCAR FedEx Freight Truck Series career
- 2 races run over 1 year
- Best finish: 66th (1995)
- First race: 1995 Subway 100 (Sonoma)
- Last race: 1995 Spears Manufacturing 200 (Mesa Marin)
Wins	Top tens	Poles
0	0	0

ARCA Menards Series West career
- 23 races run over 3 years
- Best finish: 7th (1970)
- First race: 1970 Motor Trend 500 (Riverside)
- Last race: 1974 Chula Vista 100 (Chula Vista)
Wins	Top tens	Poles
0	6	0
- Statistics up to date as of August 19, 2026.

George Thalassinos "G. T." Tallas (January 31, 1944 – November 20, 2023) was an American professional stock car racing driver. He competed in the NASCAR Winston Cup Series, NASCAR Craftsman Truck Series, and NASCAR Winston West Series.

== Racing career ==
Tallas simultaneously made his NASCAR Grand National Series and NASCAR Grand National West debut in the 1970 Motor Trend 500 at Riverside International Raceway, where he finished 31st due to engine issues; he made 15 more Grand National West starts in 1970, scoring five top-tens with a best finish of fourth twice, and finished 24th in the second Riverside combination race. He finished seventh in the standings. Tallas ran the first three races in the renamed Winston West Series in 1971, finishing seventh at Orange Show Speedway and failing to finish the combination races at Riverside and Ontario Motor Speedway. Tallas only made one NASCAR start in 1972, finishing 40th in the Winston Cup race at Ontario. After not competing in NASCAR in 1973, Tallas returned for five Winston West races in 1974, failing to qualify at Altamont Speedway and finishing one race, where he scored a season-best sixteenth at Corona Speedway. Tallas also attempted to qualify for the 1974 Daytona 500, but failed to make the field after finishing 20th in his qualifier, the last car running. Tallas ran the Winston Cup season opener at Riverside in 1975, finishing 29th; he again failed to qualify for the Daytona 500, finishing 17th in his qualifier.

In 1995, twenty years after his last NASCAR attempt, Tallas would compete in the inaugural NASCAR SuperTruck Series by Craftsman season, making three attempts with sponsorship from Hot Wheels; he would finish 22nd at Sears Point Raceway, 34th at Mesa Marin Raceway, and failed to qualify at Phoenix International Raceway. Tallas made four attempts in 1996, but failed to qualify for each of them.

== Death ==
Tallas died on November 20, 2023, following a battle with a stage four glioblastoma brain tumor.

== Motorsports career results ==
=== NASCAR ===
(key) (Bold – Pole position awarded by qualifying time. Italics – Pole position earned by points standings or practice time. * – Most laps led.)

==== Grand National Series ====
NASCAR Grand National Series results
Year	Team	No.	Make	1	2	3	4	5	6	7	8	9	10	11	12	13	14	15	16	17	18	19	20	21	22	23	24	25	26	27	28	29	30	31	32	33	34	35	36	37	38	39	40	41	42	43	44	45	46	47	48	NGNSC	Pts	Ref
1970	Tallas Racing	23	Ford	RSD; 31	DAY	DAY	DAY	RCH	CAR	SVH	ATL	BRI	TAL	NWS	CLB	DAR	BLV	LGY	CLT	SMR	MAR	MCH	RSD; 24	HCY	KPT	GPS	DAY	AST	TPN	TRN	BRI	SMR	NSV	ATL	CLB	ONA	MCH	TAL	BGS	SBO	DAR	HCY	RCH	DOV	NCF	NWS	CLT	MAR	MGR	CAR	LGY	93rd	60	
1971	Tallas Racing	23	Ford	RSD; 11	DAY	DAY	DAY	ONT; 45	RCH	CAR	HCY	BRI	ATL	CLB	GPS	SMR	NWS	MAR	DAR	SBO	TAL	ASH	KPT	CLT	DOV	MCH	RSD	HOU	GPS	DAY	BRI	AST	ISP	TRN	NSV	ATL	BGS	ONA	MCH	TAL	CLB	HCY	DAR	MAR	CLT	DOV	CAR	MGR	RCH	NWS	TWS	NA	NA	

==== Winston Cup Series ====
NASCAR Winston Cup Series results
Year	Team	No.	Make	1	2	3	4	5	6	7	8	9	10	11	12	13	14	15	16	17	18	19	20	21	22	23	24	25	26	27	28	29	30	31	NWCSC	Pts	Ref
1972	Tallas Racing	23W	Ford	RSD	DAY	RCH	ONT; 40	CAR	ATL	BRI	DAR	NWS	MAR	TAL	CLT	DOV	MCH	RSD	TWS	DAY	BRI	TRN	ATL	TAL	MCH	NSV	DAR	RCH	DOV	MAR	NWS	CLT	CAR	TWS	108th	132	
1974	Tallas Racing	23	Ford	RSD	DAY; DNQ	RCH	CAR	BRI	ATL	DAR	NWS	MAR	TAL	NSV	DOV	CLT	RSD	MCH	DAY	BRI	NSV	ATL	POC	TAL	MCH	DAR	RCH	DOV	NWS	MAR	CLT	CAR	ONT		153rd	0	
1975	Tallas Racing	20	Ford	RSD; 29	DAY; DNQ	RCH	CAR	BRI	ATL	NWS	DAR	MAR	TAL	NSV	DOV	CLT	RSD	MCH	DAY	NSV	POC	TAL	MCH	DAR	DOV	NWS	MAR	CLT	RCH	CAR	BRI	ATL	ONT		101st	76	

===== Daytona 500 =====
Year	Team	Manufacturer	Start	Finish
1974	Tallas Racing	Ford	DNQ	
1975	Tallas Racing	Ford	DNQ	

==== Craftsman Truck Series ====
NASCAR Craftsman Truck Series results
Year	Team	No.	Make	1	2	3	4	5	6	7	8	9	10	11	12	13	14	15	16	17	18	19	20	21	22	23	24	NCTSC	Pts	Ref
1995	Tallas Racing	70	Chevy	PHO	TUS	SGS	MMR	POR	EVG	I70	LVL	BRI	MLW	CNS	HPT	IRP	FLM	RCH	MAR	NWS	SON; 22	MMR; 34	PHO; DNQ					66th	186	
1996	Tallas Racing	70	Chevy	HOM; DNQ	PHO; DNQ	POR	EVG	TUS	CNS	HPT	BRI	NZH	MLW	LVL	I70	IRP	FLM	GLN	NSV	RCH	NHA	MAR	NWS	SON	MMR	PHO; DNQ	LVS; DNQ	103rd	106	

==== Winston West Series ====
NASCAR Winston West Series results
Year	Team	No.	Make	1	2	3	4	5	6	7	8	9	10	11	12	13	14	15	16	17	18	19	20	21	22	23	24	25	26	27	28	NWWSC	Pts	Ref
1970	Tallas Racing	23	Ford	RSD; 31	ASP; 4	SGB; 13	CSF; 20	RSD; 24	YAK; 19	EVG; 13	JBA; 15	CRS; 20	OSS; 9	SGS; 20	MED; 4	SAL; 10	SPS; 11	TCR; 9	WSP	S99; DNQ	ASP; 14	SGB; 18										7th	813	
1971	Tallas Racing	23	Ford	RSD; 11	ONT; 45	OSS; 7	SJS	CRS	S99	ASP	RSD	SAL	SPS	SKA	USP	POR	LSP	MED	DCS	CRS	OSS	SGS	BKS	CSP	EVG	IFS	YAK	SGB	TWS			NA	44	
1974	Tallas Racing	23	Ford	RSD	AMP; DNQ	S99; 20	MSP; 17	COR; 16	SBP; 22	ASP	RSD	WER	WSP	SPS	STA	USP	POR	MED	EUG	CBS	CAJ	CRS	ASP	AMP	CSP	EVG	YAK	POR	SGB	ASP	ONT	44th	165.25	
