= Kevin Terris =

American racing driver (1944–2008)

- Born: October 27, 1944; Hermosa Beach, California, U.S.
- Died: October 14, 2008 (aged 63)

NASCAR Cup Series career
- 11 races run over 5 years
- Best finish: 60th (1972)
- First race: 1970 Motor Trend 500 (Riverside)
- Last race: 1984 Budweiser 400 (Riverside)
Wins	Top tens	Poles
0	3	0

ARCA Menards Series West career
- 41 races run over 8 years
- Best finish: 8th (1969)
- First race: 1969 Sacramento 100 (Sacramento)
- Last race: 1985 Suncrest Motorhomes 200 (Willow Springs)
Wins	Top tens	Poles
0	13	0
- Statistics up to date as of August 22, 2026.

Kevin Terris (October 27, 1944 – October 14, 2008) was an American professional stock car racing driver. He competed in the NASCAR Winston Cup Series and NASCAR Winston West Series between 1969 and 1986.

== Racing career ==
Terris began competing in NASCAR in 1969, running at least thirteen races in the NASCAR Pacific Coast Late Model Division, where he scored six top-ten finishes and led the only three laps of his career. Terris attempted eight races in the renamed Grand National West in 1970, failing to qualify at Ascot Park and scoring two top-ten finishes. In running these races, he made his NASCAR Grand National Series debut in the Motor Trend 500 at Riverside International Raceway, a combination race with the Grand National West, finishing 12th; in the second Riverside combination race, Terris finished in 38th due to engine issues. Terris made five starts in the renamed Winston West Series in 1971, scoring two top-tens. He also made four starts in the renamed Winston Cup Series, finishing seventh in both Riverside combination races and 42nd in the combination race at Ontario Motor Speedway; in his first standalone Winston Cup start at Talladega Superspeedway, he finished 26th due to overheating issues. Terris competed in eight Winston West races in 1972, scoring three top-ten finishes, the final of his career. In the combination races at Riverside, he finished sixth and 17th and finished 22nd in the combination race at Ontario. Terris would not compete in NASACR again until 1982, finishing 41st in a combination race at Riverside and 27th at Phoenix International Raceway. Terris made one Winston West start in 1983, finishing 12th at Riverside. Terris made three starts in 1984, scoring a best finish of 15th at Phoenix. In the combination race at Riverside, Terris made his final career Winston Cup start, finishing 24th. Terris made his final Winston West starts in 1985, failing to finish his starts at Sears Point International Raceway and Willow Springs Speedway and failing to qualify at Riverside. Terris made his final Winston Cup attempt at Riverside in 1986, failing to qualify.

== Motorsports career results ==
=== NASCAR ===
(key) (Bold – Pole position awarded by qualifying time. Italics – Pole position earned by points standings or practice time. * – Most laps led.)

==== Grand National Series ====
NASCAR Grand National Series results
Year	Team	No.	Make	1	2	3	4	5	6	7	8	9	10	11	12	13	14	15	16	17	18	19	20	21	22	23	24	25	26	27	28	29	30	31	32	33	34	35	36	37	38	39	40	41	42	43	44	45	46	47	48	NGNSC	Pts	Ref
1970	Gary Sigman	321	Plymouth	RSD; 12	DAY	DAY	DAY	RCH	CAR	SVH	ATL	BRI	TAL	NWS	CLB	DAR	BLV	LGY	CLT	SMR	MAR	MCH																														72nd	117	
1970	Gary Sigman	32	Plymouth																				RSD; 38	HCY	KPT	GPS	DAY	AST	TPN	TRN	BRI	SMR	NSV	ATL	CLB	ONA	MCH	TAL	BGS	SBO	DAR	HCY	RCH	DOV	NCF	NWS	CLT	MAR	MGR	CAR	LGY	72nd	117	
1971	Dean Barnicle	32	Plymouth	RSD; 7	DAY	DAY	DAY	ONT; 42	RCH	CAR	HCY	BRI	ATL	CLB	GPS	SMR	NWS	MAR	DAR	SBO							RSD; 7	HOU	GPS	DAY	BRI	AST	ISP	TRN	NSV	ATL	BGS	ONA	MCH	TAL	CLB	HCY	DAR	MAR	CLT	DOV	CAR	MGR	RCH	NWS	TWS	NA	NA	
1971	Brooks Racing	32	Plymouth																		TAL; 26	ASH	KPT	CLT	DOV	MCH																										NA	NA	

==== Winston Cup Series ====
NASCAR Winston Cup Series results
Year	Team	No.	Make	1	2	3	4	5	6	7	8	9	10	11	12	13	14	15	16	17	18	19	20	21	22	23	24	25	26	27	28	29	30	31	NWCSC	Pts	Ref
1972	Dean Barnicle	32	Plymouth	RSD; 6	DAY	RCH																													60th	783.5	
1972	Dean Barnicle	32W	Plymouth				ONT; 22	CAR	ATL	BRI	DAR	NWS	MAR	TAL	CLT	DOV	MCH	RSD; 17	TWS	DAY	BRI	TRN	ATL	TAL	MCH	NSV	DAR	RCH	DOV	MAR	NWS	CLT	CAR	TWS	60th	783.5	
1982	Terris Racing	13	Buick	DAY	RCH	BRI	ATL	CAR	DAR	NWS	MAR	TAL	NSV	DOV	CLT	POC	RSD	MCH	DAY	NSV	POC	TAL	MCH	BRI	DAR	RCH	DOV	NWS	CLT	MAR	CAR	ATL	RSD; 41		107th	40	
1984	Terris Racing	13	Buick	DAY	RCH	CAR	ATL	BRI	NWS	DAR	MAR	TAL	NSV	DOV	CLT	RSD; 24	POC	MCH	DAY	NSV	POC	TAL	MCH	BRI	DAR	RCH	DOV	MAR	CLT	NWS	CAR	ATL	RSD		100th	NA	
1986	Whisner Racing	42	Chevy	DAY	RCH	CAR	ATL	BRI	DAR	NWS	MAR	TAL	DOV	CLT	RSD	POC	MCH	DAY	POC	TAL	GLN	MCH	BRI	DAR	RCH	DOV	MAR	NWS	CLT	CAR	ATL	RSD; DNQ			146th	0	

==== Winston West Series ====
NASCAR Winston West Series results
Year	Team	No.	Make	1	2	3	4	5	6	7	8	9	10	11	12	13	14	15	16	17	18	19	20	21	22	23	24	25	26	27	28	29	30	NWWSC	Pts	Ref
1969	Gary Sigman	32	Plymouth	RSD	CSF; 25	SGV; 20	SON; 11	EVG	TCR; 14	YAK; 19	DCS; 9	SAL; 6	JBA; 15	OSS	SGS	SON; 3	YAK	EVG	CPR; 4	POR; 8	SMS; 16	SGV; 10	TWS											8th	774	
1970	Gary Sigman	321	Plymouth	RSD; 12																														12th	416	
1970	Gary Sigman	32	Plymouth		ASP; DNQ	SGB; 5	CSF; 11	RSD; 38	YAK; 20	EVG; 21	JBA	CRS	OSS	SGS	MED	SAL	SPS	TCR	WSP	S99	ASP	SGB; 8												12th	416	
1971	Dean Barnicle	32	Plymouth	RSD; 7	ONT; 42	OSS	SJS	CRS	S99	ASP; 19	RSD; 7	SAL	SPS	SKA	USP	POR	LSP	MED	DCS	CRS	OSS	SGS	BKS	CSP; 14	EVG	IFS	YAK	SGB	TWS					25th	360	
1972	Dean Barnicle	32	Plymouth	RSD; 6										POR; 12	IFS	MER																		18th	856.5	
1972	Dean Barnicle	32W	Plymouth		ONT; 22	SJS	S99	SMN	TCR	YAK	EVG	RSD; 17	MED																					18th	856.5	
1972	Dean Barnicle	32	Mercury														SPS; 17																	18th	856.5	
1972	Dean Barnicle	32	Dodge															LSP; 17	WSP; 7	SKA; 10	RAS	CRS	OSS	SGS	CSP	BKS	EVG	USP	YAK	POR	ASP	WCR	SMN	18th	856.5	
1982	Terris Racing	13	Buick	MMR	S99	AAS	RSD	POR	WSP	SHA	EVG	SON	CDR	RSD	RSD; 41	PHO; 27																		32nd	58	
1983	Terris Racing	32	Pontiac	S99	SON	RSD	YAK	EVG	SHA	RSD; 12	CPL	RSD	PHO																					NA	NA	
1984	Terris Racing	13	Buick	RSD; 24	YAK	SIR	POR	EVG	SHA	WSR; 18	SON	MMR	RSD																					23rd	146	
1984	Unknown	41	Chevy											PHO; 15																				23rd	146	
1985	Golden West Racing	42	Chevy	SON; 19	SHA	RSD	MMR	SIR	POR	STA	YAK	EVG	WSR; 16	MMR	RSD; DNQ																			30th	98	
1986	Whisner Racing	42	Chevy	SON	RSD	EVG	RCS	TAC	PIR	WSR	RSD; DNQ																							49th	29	
