= Bill Shirey =

American racing driver (born 1932)

- Born: February 28, 1932 (age 94); Detroit, Michigan, U.S.

NASCAR Cup Series career
- 72 races run over 4 years
- Best finish: 28th (1971)
- First race: 1969 Race 49 (Savannah)
- Last race: 1972 Texas 500 (Texas)
Wins	Top tens	Poles
0	3	0

NASCAR Grand National East Series career
- 9 races run over 2 years
- Best finish: 19th (1973)
- First race: 1972 Greenville 200 (Greenville)
- Last race: 1973 Cumberland 200 (Cumberland)
Wins	Top tens	Poles
0	0	0
- Statistics up to date as of May 21, 2026.

Bill Shirey (born February 28, 1932) is an American former professional stock car racing driver who competed in the NASCAR Winston Cup Series.

== Career ==
Shirey accomplished three finishes in the top ten (1970 Richmond 500, 1971 Asheville 300, and 1971 Kingsport 300) and has driven for 9,588 laps - the equivalent of 7,398.2 miles (11,906.2 km). He started 24th on average and also finished an average of 24th place. Shirey attempted to qualify for the 1971 Daytona 500 and the 1972 Miller High Life 500 but failed. His total earnings from his NASCAR career were $30,395 ($233,947.2 when adjusted for inflation).

Compared to his meager career earnings, today's NASCAR Cup Series stars are generally considered to be multimillionaires after their first full-time schedule. Shirey was an owner-driver for most of the races with occasional employment under former NASCAR owners Dub Clewis, John Keselowski, and David Ray Boggs. While disqualifications are rare in NASCAR, Shirey was handed a disqualification at the 1972 Northern 300 racing event that took place in Trenton International Speedway.

== Motorsports career results ==
=== NASCAR ===
(key) (Bold – Pole position awarded by qualifying time. Italics – Pole position earned by points standings or practice time. * – Most laps led.)

==== Grand National Series ====
NASCAR Grand National Series results
Year	Team	No.	Make	1	2	3	4	5	6	7	8	9	10	11	12	13	14	15	16	17	18	19	20	21	22	23	24	25	26	27	28	29	30	31	32	33	34	35	36	37	38	39	40	41	42	43	44	45	46	47	48	49	50	51	52	53	54	NGNC	Pts	Ref
1969	Dub Clewis	03	Plymouth	MGR	MGY	RSD	DAY	DAY	DAY	CAR	AUG	BRI	ATL	CLB	HCY	GPS	RCH	NWS	MAR	AWS	DAR	BLV	LGY	CLT	MGR	SMR	MCH	KPT	GPS	NCF	DAY	DOV	TPN	TRN	BLV	BRI	NSV	SMR	ATL	MCH	SBO	BGS	AWS	DAR	HCY	RCH	TAL	CLB	MAR	NWS	CLT	SVH; 20	AUG; 14	CAR	JFC	MGR		61st	137	
1969	Bill Shirey	74	Plymouth																																																						TWS; 28	61st	137	
1970	Bill Shirey	74	Plymouth	RSD	DAY; 29	DAY	DAY; DNQ	RCH; 9	CAR; 25	SVH; 14	ATL	BRI; 16	TAL; 40	NWS; DNQ	CLB; 19	DAR; DNQ	BLV	LGY	CLT	SMR	MAR; 30	MCH; 26	RSD	HCY; 14	KPT; 22	GPS; 28	DAY; 39	AST; 27	TPN; 30	TRN; 36	BRI	SMR	NSV; 15	ATL	CLB; 13	ONA	MCH; 27	TAL; 44	BGS; 13	SBO; 13	DAR	HCY; 17	RCH; 30	DOV; 16	NCF; 11	NWS	CLT; DNQ	MAR; DNQ	MGR; 17	CAR; 36	LGY; 16							30th	1244	
1971	Bill Shirey	74	Plymouth	RSD	DAY; 27	DAY	DAY; DNQ	ONT	RCH; 16	CAR	HCY; 12	BRI; 26	ATL	CLB; 25	GPS	SMR; 28	NWS; 14	MAR; 28	DAR	SBO; 15	TAL	ASH; 10	KPT; 9	CLT	DOV; 29	MCH	RSD	HOU	GPS; 22	DAY	BRI; 30	AST; 14	ISP; 25	TRN; 23	NSV; 22	ATL	BGS; 29	ONA; 32	MCH	TAL; DNQ	CLB; 16	HCY; 19	DAR; 28	MAR; 24	CLT	DOV; 25	CAR	MGR			TWS; 28							28th	1303	
1971	John Keselowski	62	Dodge																																														RCH; 27	NWS								28th	1303	

==== Winston Cup Series ====
NASCAR Winston Cup Series results
Year	Team	No.	Make	1	2	3	4	5	6	7	8	9	10	11	12	13	14	15	16	17	18	19	20	21	22	23	24	25	26	27	28	29	30	31	NWCC	Pts	Ref
1972	Bill Shirey	74	Plymouth	RSD	DAY; DNQ	RCH; 22	ONT; DNQ	CAR; 31	ATL; DNQ	BRI	DAR; DNQ	NWS	MAR; 26	TAL; DNQ	CLT	DOV; 23	MCH; 31	RSD		DAY; 34	BRI	TRN; 30	ATL	TAL; 47	MCH; DNQ	NSV	DAR	RCH	DOV; 18	MAR; 36	NWS; 20	CLT	CAR		38th	1468.5	
1972	Bill Shirey	74	Dodge																TWS; 44																38th	1468.5	
1972	David Ray Boggs	57	Dodge																															TWS; 29	38th	1468.5	
