= Pete Hamilton =

American racing driver

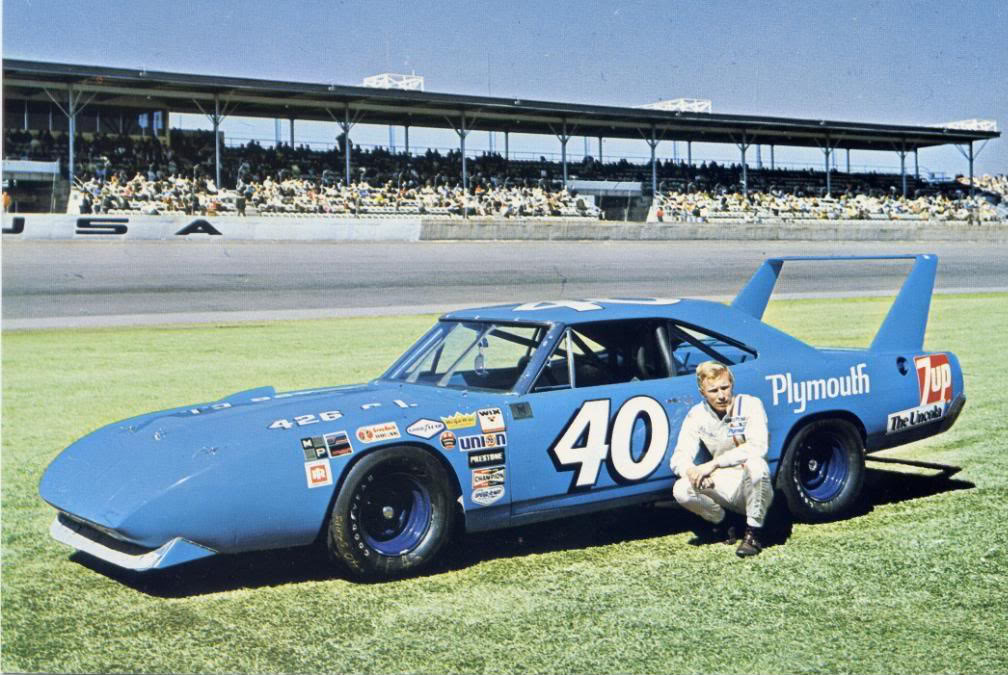
- Hamilton and his 1970 Plymouth race car
- Born: Peter Goodwill Hamilton; July 20, 1942; Dedham, Massachusetts, U.S.
- Died: March 21, 2017 (aged 74); Johns Creek, Georgia, U.S.
- Achievements: 1967 NASCAR Sportsman Division Champion; 1970 Daytona 500 Winner; 1974, 1975 World Series of Asphalt Super Late Model Champion; 1974 Snowball Derby Winner; 1975 Rattler 250 Winner
- Awards: 1968 NASCAR Grand National Series Rookie of the Year; New England Auto Racers Hall of Fame (1998)

NASCAR Cup Series career
- 64 races run over 6 years
- Best finish: 21st (1970)
- First race: 1968 Fireball 300 (Weaverville)
- Last race: 1973 Atlanta 500 (Atlanta)
- First win: 1970 Daytona 500 (Daytona)
- Last win: 1971 Daytona 500 Qualifier #1 (Daytona)
Wins	Top tens	Poles
4	33	3
- Statistics up to date as of October 29, 2013.

Peter Goodwill Hamilton (July 20, 1942 – March 21, 2017) was an American professional stock car racing driver. He competed in NASCAR for six years, where he won four times in his career (including the 1970 Daytona 500), three times driving for Petty Enterprises.

== Racing career ==
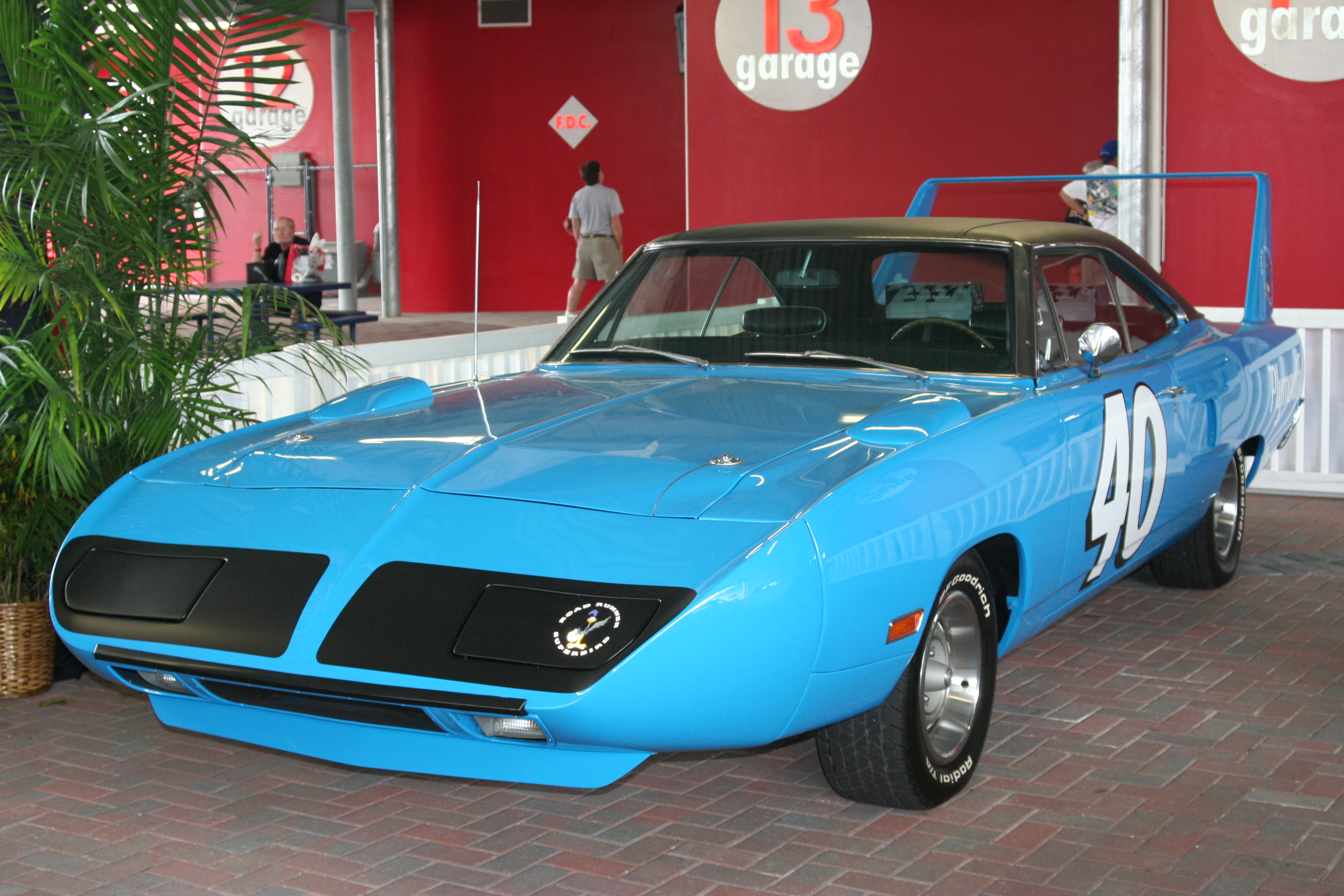
A street replica of Pete Hamilton's Plymouth Superbird, with which he won the 1970 Daytona 500.

Hamilton began racing in the street division in 1962 at Norwood Arena Speedway in Massachusetts, where he quickly earned the nickname "The Dedham Flash". In 1965, he was the Thompson World Series Twin 50s champion. He won the 1967 NASCAR national Sportsman division championship.

After that season, Hamilton moved south to race in NASCAR. He started racing in the NASCAR Grand National division in 1968, and was the series Rookie of the Year. In 1969, he competed in NASCAR's Grand American division, a division of smaller pony cars. He won 12 of 26 races that year.

Hamilton had three wins in 1970 for Petty Enterprises in the No. 40 Plymouth Superbird with Maurice Petty as his crew-chief. He won the 1970 Daytona 500 and both races at Talladega Superspeedway. Hamilton won his Twin 125 mile qualifying race for the 1971 Daytona 500 driving Cotton Owens' No. 6 Plymouth, finishing the season with one pole and 11 top five finishes. He retired from full-time NASCAR racing after 1973 because of complications from a neck injury in a 1969 Grand American race.

Hamilton continued to compete in short track races, and won the 1974 Snowball Derby in his late model racecar.

== Car builder ==
Hamilton helped Chrysler's Larry Rathgeb develop their "Kit-Car", a weld-it-yourself Volare or Aspen late model stock car that any racer could order from Plymouth and Dodge dealers. He moved to Norcross, Georgia, and worked as a car builder and mentor to many drivers on the 1980s southern dirt tracks, launching successful racing careers for Marvin Oliver and James Shepherd.

== Career award ==
Hamilton was inducted into the New England Auto Racers Hall of Fame in 1998 in its inaugural class. He was named to the Georgia Racing Hall of Fame in 2012.

== Personal life ==
Hamilton was born outside Boston in Dedham, and raised in nearby Newton, Massachusetts. He was the son of Roger S. Hamilton, once the Dean of Northeastern University. He graduated from Newton High School in 1960. He married his wife, Susan Huckstorf in 1970. After racing, he owned a warehouse in Atlanta. He spent his time between Duluth, Georgia and Acton, Maine.

== Death ==
Hamilton died on March 21, 2017, at the age of 74 due to complications of a stroke. He was buried at Peachtree Memorial Park in Norcross, Georgia. He was survived by his wife of forty-seven years and a daughter.

== Motorsports career results ==
=== NASCAR ===
(key) (Bold – Pole position awarded by qualifying time. Italics – Pole position earned by points standings or practice time. * – Most laps led.)

==== Grand National Series ====
NASCAR Grand National Series results
Year	Team	No.	Make	1	2	3	4	5	6	7	8	9	10	11	12	13	14	15	16	17	18	19	20	21	22	23	24	25	26	27	28	29	30	31	32	33	34	35	36	37	38	39	40	41	42	43	44	45	46	47	48	49	50	51	52	53	54	NGNC	Pts	Ref
1968	Rocky Hinton	5	Ford	MGR	MGY	RSD	DAY	BRI	RCH	ATL	HCY	GPS	CLB	NWS	MAR	AUG	AWS; 12	DAR	BLV; 19	LGY; 5	CLT	ASH	MGR	SMR; 2	BIR	CAR; 25	GPS	DAY	ISP	OXF; 7	FDA	TRN; 5	BRI; 21	SMR; 23	NSV	ATL; 28	CLB	BGS																				32nd	919	
1968	King Enterprises	1	Dodge																																				AWS; 10	SBO	LGY	DAR; 32	HCY	RCH	BLV	HBO	MAR; 34	NWS; 12	AUG	CLT; 7	CAR; 34	JFC						32nd	919	
1969	King Enterprises	1	Dodge	MGR	MGY	RSD	DAY; 8	DAY	DAY; 44	CAR	AUG	BRI																																														NA	-	
1969	Banjo Matthews	27	Ford										ATL; 5	CLB	HCY	GPS	RCH	NWS	MAR	AWS	DAR	BLV	LGY	CLT	MGR	SMR	MCH	KPT	GPS	NCF	DAY	DOV	TPN	TRN	BLV	BRI	NSV	SMR	ATL	MCH	SBO	BGS	AWS	DAR	HCY	RCH	TAL	CLB	MAR	NWS	CLT	SVH	AUG	CAR	JFC	MGR	TWS	NA	-	
1970	Petty Enterprises	40	Plymouth	RSD	DAY; 5	DAY	DAY; 1	RCH	CAR; 5	SVH	ATL; 3	BRI	TAL; 1	NWS	CLB	DAR; 19	BLV	LGY	CLT; 8	SMR	MAR	**MCH**; 2	RSD	HCY	KPT	GPS	DAY; 30	AST	TPN	TRN	BRI	SMR	NSV	ATL; 6	CLB	ONA	MCH; 5	TAL; 1*	BGS	SBO	DAR; 3	HCY	RCH	DOV	NCF	NWS	CLT; 24*	MAR	MGR	CAR; 15								21st	1819	
1970	Dick Brooks Racing	32	Plymouth																																																LGY; 3							21st	1819	
1971	Cotton Owens	6	Plymouth	RSD	DAY; 1	DAY	DAY; 28	ONT; 31	RCH	CAR; 24	HCY	BRI	ATL; 3	CLB	GPS	SMR	NWS	MAR	DAR; 35	SBO	TAL; 4	ASH	KPT	CLT; 3	DOV; 26	MCH; 3	RSD	HOU	GPS	DAY; 4	BRI			TRN; 5	NSV	ATL; 24	BGS	ONA	**MCH**; 31	TAL; 3	CLB	HCY	DAR; 30	MAR	CLT; 7	DOV	CAR; 4	MGR	RCH; 3	NWS	**TWS**; 4							24th	1739	
1971	Junior Fields	91	Chevy																													AST; 27	ISP; 23																									24th	1739	

==== Winston Cup Series ====
NASCAR Winston Cup Series results
Year	Team	No.	Make	1	2	3	4	5	6	7	8	9	10	11	12	13	14	15	16	17	18	19	20	21	22	23	24	25	26	27	28	29	30	31	NWCC	Pts	Ref
1972	Housby Racing	9	Plymouth	RSD	DAY	RCH	ONT	CAR	ATL	BRI	DAR	NWS	MAR	TAL	CLT	DOV	MCH; 22	RSD	TWS	DAY; 33	BRI	TRN	ATL	TAL; 19	MCH	NSV	DAR	RCH	DOV	MAR	NWS	CLT; 32	CAR; 5	TWS	48th	1083.25	
1973	Housby Racing	9	Plymouth	RSD	DAY; 40	RCH	CAR	BRI																											114th	-	
1973	Crawford Brothers Racing	22	Plymouth						ATL; 39	NWS	DAR	MAR	TAL	NSV	CLT	DOV	TWS	RSD	MCH	DAY	BRI	ATL	TAL	NSV	DAR	RCH	DOV	NWS	MAR	CLT	CAR				114th	-	

===== Daytona 500 =====
Year	Manufacturer	Start	Finish	Team
1969	Dodge	17	44	King Enterprises
1970	Plymouth	9	**1**	Petty Enterprises
1971	Plymouth	3	28	Cotton Owens
1973	Plymouth	2	40	Housby Racing

Achievements
Preceded by LeeRoy Yarbrough	Daytona 500 Winner; 1970	Succeeded by Richard Petty
Preceded by Dickie Davis	Snowball Derby Winner; 1974	Succeeded by Donnie Allison
