= 1971 Daytona 500 =

Auto race held at Daytona International Speedway in 1971

Coordinates: 29°11′8″N 81°4′10″W

Race details
- Race 4 of 48 in the 1971 NASCAR Winston Cup Series
- 1971 Daytona 500 program cover
- Date: February 14, 1971
- Official name: Daytona 500
- Location: Daytona International Speedway; Daytona Beach, Florida, U.S.
- Course: Permanent racing facility
- Course length: 2.5 miles (4.023 km)
- Distance: 200 laps, 500 mi (800 km)
- Weather: Partly cloudy and cold with a high of 54 °F (12 °C); wind speed 13.23 miles per hour (21.29 km/h)
- Average speed: 144.462 mph (232.489 km/h)
- Attendance: 80,000

Pole position
Driver	A. J. Foyt	Wood Brothers

Most laps led
Driver	Richard Petty	Petty Enterprises
- Laps: 69

Winner
No. 43	Richard Petty	Petty Enterprises

Television in the United States
- Network: ABC
- Announcers: Chris Economaki (color commentator), Keith Jackson (lap-by-lap announcer)

Pete Hamilton (#6) and Dick Brooks (#22) at the 1971 running of the Daytona 500. Brooks' Dodge was the only winged vehicle in the race.

The 1971 Daytona 500, the 13th running of the event, was a NASCAR Winston Cup Series race held on February 14, 1971 at Daytona International Speedway in Daytona Beach, Florida. Spanning 500 miles (800 km) on the paved oval track, it was the first Daytona 500 in the Winston Cup era of NASCAR. During this time, Richard Petty (the race winner and the eventual Winston Cup champion) was becoming one of the winningest veterans on the NASCAR circuit.

== Background ==
Daytona International Speedway, the track where the race was held.

Daytona International Speedway is a race track in Daytona Beach, Florida that is one of six superspeedways to hold NASCAR races, the others being Michigan International Speedway, Auto Club Speedway, Indianapolis Motor Speedway, Pocono Raceway and Talladega Superspeedway. The standard track at Daytona is a four-turn superspeedway that is 2.5 miles (4.0 km) long. The track also features two other layouts that utilize portions of the primary high speed tri-oval, such as a 3.56-mile (5.73 km) sports car course and a 2.95-mile (4.75 km) motorcycle course. The track's 180-acre (73 ha) infield includes the 29-acre (12 ha) Lake Lloyd, which has hosted powerboat racing. The speedway is owned and operated by International Speedway Corporation.

The track was built by NASCAR founder Bill France Sr. to host racing that was being held at the former Daytona Beach Road Course and opened with the first Daytona 500 in 1959. The speedway has been renovated three times, with the infield renovated in 2004, and the track repaved in 1978 and 2010.

The Daytona 500 is regarded as the most important and prestigious race on the NASCAR calendar. It is also the series' first race of the year; this phenomenon is virtually unique in sports, which tend to have championships or other major events at the end of the season rather than the start. Since 1995, U.S. television ratings for the Daytona 500 have been the highest for any auto race of the year, surpassing the traditional leader, the Indianapolis 500 which in turn greatly surpasses the Daytona 500 in in-track attendance and international viewing. The 2006 Daytona 500 attracted the sixth largest average live global TV audience of any sporting event that year with 20 million viewers.

== Race report ==
The manufacturers that were involved included Chevrolet, Mercury, Ford, Plymouth, and Dodge. For the 500 miles the average speed was 144.462 miles per hour (232.489 km/h).

The fastest qualifying speed for the 1971 Daytona 500 was more than 190 miles per hour (310 km/h). The forty car field included legends like A. J. Foyt and David Pearson, both eventually acquiring top-five finishes. A.J. Foyt in the Wood Bros. Mercury had the car to beat all day, but the crew had trouble filling it with gas. He ran out while leading on lap 162. Foyt's crew found out someone crushed the filler neck on the gas tank. There were 34 lead changes in the first 250 miles of the race.

First Daytona 500 starts for Bill Dennis and Maynard Troyer. Only Daytona 500 start for Pedro Rodriguez, Freddy Fryar, Marv Acton, and Larry Baumel. Last Daytona 500 starts for Fred Lorenzen, LeeRoy Yarbrough, and Friday Hassler.

Drivers who failed to qualify for the race were: Ed Negre (#8), Vic Elford (#59), Charlie Roberts (#63), Dick May (#67), J.D. McDuffie (#70), Bill Shirey (#74), Dick Poling (#78), Joe Hines (#80), Bobby Mausgrover (#84), Butch Hirst (#87), Leonard Blanchard (#95), Robert Brown (#58), E.J. Trivette (#56), Roy Mayne (#46), Jimmy Crawford (#02), Pedro Rodríguez (#14), Dub Simpson (#16), Fritz Schultz (#23), Earl Brooks (#26), Bill Hollar (#28), Walter Ballard (#30), Wendell Scott (#34), Blackie Wangerin (#38) and Ken Meisenhelder (#41).

Notable crew chiefs for this race were Paul Goldsmith, Junie Donlavey, Harry Hyde, Dale Inman, Tom Vandiver, Vic Ballard, Jake Elder among others.

== Race results ==
Pos	Grid	No.	Driver	Entrant	Manufacturer	Laps	Winnings	Laps led	Time/Status
1	5	43	Richard Petty	Petty Enterprises	1971 Plymouth	200	$45,450	69	3:27:40
2	6	11	Buddy Baker	Petty Enterprises	1971 Dodge	200	$16,100	16	+10 seconds
3	1	21	A. J. Foyt	Wood Brothers Racing	1969 Mercury	200	$14,500	36	Lead lap, under green flag
4	4	17	David Pearson	Holman-Moody	1969 Mercury	199	$4,225	6	+1 Lap
5	9	99	Fred Lorenzen	Ray Nichels	1971 Plymouth	199	$3,825	0	+1 Lap
6	32	31	Jim Vandiver	O. L. Nixon	1969 Dodge	198	$3,475	0	+2 Laps
7	8	22	Dick Brooks	Mario Rossi	1969 Dodge	198	$3,125	5	+2 Laps
8	24	20	Jim Hurtubise	Jimmy McCain	1970 Ford	197	$2,800	0	+3 Laps
9	15	48	James Hylton	James Hylton	1969 Ford	197	$2,600	4	+3 Laps
10	2	71	Bobby Isaac	Nord Krauskopf	1971 Dodge	197	$3,950	37	+3 Laps
11	14	7	Ramo Stott	Ramo Stott	1971 Plymouth	195	$2,350	0	+5 Laps
12	25	18	Joe Frasson	Joe Frasson	1970 Dodge	194	$2,200	0	+6 Laps
13	36	25	Pedro Rodríguez	Don Robertson	1970 Plymouth	194	$1,975	0	+6 Laps
14	16	64	Elmo Langley	Elmo Langley	1969 Mercury	193	$1,850	0	+7 Laps
15	34	04	Freddy Fryar	Buster Davis	1969 Dodge	192	$1,800	0	+8 Laps
16	27	10	Bill Champion	Bill Champion	1969 Ford	191	$1,700	0	+9 Laps
17	19	24	Cecil Gordon	Cecil Gordon	1969 Mercury	187	$1,750	0	+13 Laps
18	31	12	Bobby Allison	Bobby Allison Motorsports	1970 Dodge	187	$1,600	7	+13 Laps
19	38	40	Marv Acton	Dick Brooks	1970 Plymouth	186	$1,550	0	+14 Laps
20	26	07	Coo Coo Marlin	H. B. Cunningham	1969 Chevrolet	184	$1,500	0	+16 Laps
21	20	03	Tommy Gale	Larry Jackson	1969 Mercury	183	$1,475	0	+17 Laps
22	29	68	Larry Baumel	Allan Schlauer	1969 Ford	179	$1,525	0	+21 Laps
23	28	76	Ben Arnold	Ben Arnold	1969 Ford	179	$1,425	0	+21 Laps
24	37	79	Frank Warren	Frank Warren	1969 Plymouth	178	$1,400	0	+22 Laps
25	17	2	Dave Marcis	Marcis Auto Racing	1969 Dodge	173	$1,375	0	Engine
26	11	27	Donnie Allison	Banjo Matthews	1969 Mercury	170	$1,350	10	Crash
27	10	90	Bill Dennis	Donlavey Racing	1969 Mercury	162	$1,525	0	Clutch
28	3	6	Pete Hamilton	Cotton Owens	1971 Plymouth	157	$2,050	6	Engine
29	21	4	John Sears	John Sears	1969 Dodge	126	$1,275	0	Engine
30	35	45	Bill Seifert	Bill Seifert	1970 Ford	111	$1,250	0	Steering
31	40	19	Henley Gray	Henley Gray	1969 Ford	93	$1,225	0	Steering
32	22	44	Red Farmer	Richard Giachetti	1971 Ford	91	$1,200	0	Engine
33	13	3	Cale Yarborough	Ray Fox	1971 Plymouth	61	$1,375	0	Engine
34	7	98	LeeRoy Yarbrough	Junior Johnson & Associates	1969 Mercury	45	$1,150	4	Oil line
35	12	72	Benny Parsons	L. G. DeWitt	1969 Ford	39	$1,125	0	Ignition
36	33	39	Friday Hassler	Friday Hassler	1969 Chevrolet	38	$1,200	0	Engine
37	30	06	Neil Castles	Neil Castles	1969 Dodge	24	$1,075	0	Ignition
38	18	60	Maynard Troyer	Joe Nagle	1969 Ford	9	$1,050	0	Crash
39	23	55	Tiny Lund	John McConnell	1969 Dodge	7	$1,025	0	Ignition
40	39	88	Ron Keselowski	Roger Lubinski	1970 Dodge	1	$1,000	0	Quit

=== Timeline ===
Section reference:

- Start: A.J. Foyt was leading the race as the checkered flag was being waved, Ron Keselowski quit the race.
- Lap 7: Tiny Lund's vehicle had some ignition problems.
- Lap 9: Maynard Troyer spun to the apron of Turn Two and tumbled to the entry to the backstretch, rolling 15 times.
- Lap 24: Neil Castles' vehicle had some ignition problems.
- Lap 38: Friday Hassler fell out with engine failure.
- Lap 39: Benny Parsons' vehicle had some ignition problems.
- Lap 45: An oil line problem forced LeeRoy Yarborough out of the race; the car caught fire before Yarbrough could reach the pits.
- Lap 61: Cale Yarborough fell out with engine failure.
- Lap 91: Red Farmer managed to ruin his vehicle's engine.
- Lap 93: Henley Gray just could not steer his vehicle properly.
- Lap 111: Bill Seifert just could not steer his vehicle properly.
- Lap 126: John Sears managed to ruin his vehicle's engine.
- Lap 157: Pete Hamilton managed to ruin his vehicle's engine.
- Lap 162: Bill Dennis' vehicle developed a problematic clutch.
- Lap 170: Donnie Allison had a terminal crash, forcing him to leave the event early.
- Lap 173: Dave Marcis managed to ruin his vehicle's engine.
- Finish: Richard Petty was officially declared the winner of the race.

== Post-race report ==
=== Winnings and championship potential ===
The winner's purse for the 1971 Daytona 500 was $45,450 American dollars ($361,322 when inflation is taken into effect). Last place finisher received $1,000 ($7,950 with inflation). Richard Petty would go on to win four more Daytona 500 races (1973, 1974, 1979, and 1981). There were seven cautions for forty-four laps.

=== Attendance ===
Attendance for the 1971 Daytona 500 reached 80,000 spectators; Expansion in the next eighteen years would bring attendance up to 180,000 people. ABC's Wide World of Sports televised the race. The commentary was handled by the legendary Chris Economaki who broadcast the Daytona 500 races in the 1970s.

=== End of a tradition ===
All of the vehicles utilized during that running of the Daytona 500 were based on street version sheet metal and engine blocks of cars manufactured between 1969 and 1971. Deviation of up to two or three model years was expected because parity wasn't enforced by NASCAR during that era and different teams had different budgets from each other.

Out of the forty racers competing in the 1971 Daytona 500, thirty-nine were American and one was Mexican. Pedro Rodriguez (who would finish in thirteenth place) would have an asphalt racing course named after him after he died six months later in Germany during a sports car race (along with his older brother Ricardo Rodríguez).

In this race, Dick Brooks would be the final driver to make a competitive run with a winged vehicle. Following the 1970 season, special, limited production 'aero' cars such as the Dodge Daytona and Plymouth Superbird, as well as the Ford Torino Talladega and Mercury Spoiler II, were restricted to a 305 ci engine. Brooks' Mario Rossi team was the only team to run a winged car in the race, and although they had a 7th-place run in the race, elected to run a conventional big-block powered car the rest of the season. Rear wings would not appear again in NASCAR until 2007 with the 'Car of Tomorrow'.

Preceded by 1970 Daytona 500	Daytona 500 races 1959-present	Succeeded by 1972 Daytona 500

Preceded by 1971 Motor Trend 500	NASCAR Winston Cup Season; 1971	Succeeded by 1971 Miller High Life 500

Preceded by 1970 Georgia 500	Richard Petty's Career Wins; 1960–1984	Succeeded by 1971 Richmond 500
