= 1970 Tidewater 300 =

Auto race held at Langley Field Speedway in 1970

Race details
- Race 48 of 48 in the 1970 NASCAR Grand National Series season
- Date: November 22, 1970; 54 years ago
- Official name: Tidewater 300
- Location: Langley Field Speedway, Hampton, Virginia
- Course: Permanent racing facility
- Course length: 0.836 km (0.395 miles)
- Distance: 300 laps, 118.5 mi (190.3 km)
- Weather: Chilly with temperatures of 63 °F (17 °C); wind speeds of 13 miles per hour (21 km/h)
- Average speed: 69.584 miles per hour (111.985 km/h)
- Attendance: 3,200

Pole position
Driver	Benny Parsons	DeWitt Racing

Most laps led
Driver	Bobby Allison	Bobby Allison Motorsports
- Laps: 254

Winner
No. 22	Bobby Allison	Bobby Allison Motorsports

Television in the United States
- Network: untelevised
- Announcers: none

The 1970 Tidewater 300 was a NASCAR Grand National Series event that was held on Sunday, November 22, 1970, at Langley Field Speedway in Hampton, Virginia.

The race car drivers who used General Motors vehicles would be humiliated at the end of the race because they failed to win any races during the 1970 NASCAR Grand National Series season. NASCAR was on a big remeasuring kick during that year. They found out that a lot of tracks were slightly bigger or smaller than originally advertised. Bristol and Martinsville still use the measurements that were discovered in 1970.

Between 1950 and 1970, the most dominant drivers in the NASCAR Grand National Series were Richard Petty (with 119 wins), David Pearson (with 58 wins), and Lee Petty (with 53 wins).

== Background ==
Langley Speedway is a paved short track measuring 0.395 miles in length, it is one of the flattest tracks in the region with only six degrees of banking in the corners and four degrees on the straights.

== Race report ==
Considered to be the 48th event of the 1970 season, this race was the final race of an unregulated stock car racing organization without a corporate sponsor. Economic issues and the need to increase the total amount of winnings for each qualifying participant required NASCAR to accept a major corporate sponsor to bankroll what will become multimillion-dollar purses by the end of the 20th century. Like all races done before the 1973 oil crisis, the stock cars were considered to be the same vehicles that the drivers drove to the racetrack in. Homologation rules would remain strict until approximately 1975 when the NASCAR teams would abandon the Detroit factories and set up their own race car factories in the South Carolina area.

The race was decided in a time of one hour and forty minutes. Bobby Allison was declared the race winner. There were two cautions (for ten laps) and 3,200 people attended this 300 lap (118.5 miles) race. Speeds approached 69.584 miles per hour (111.985 km/h) as the average and 78.239 miles per hour (125.913 km/h) for the pole position speed. The margin of victory was only one hundred yards (the equivalent of a football field as used by the National Football League). Other top participants were Benny Parsons (with his first career pole position), Pete Hamilton, John Sears, James Hylton, Neil Castles, Elmo Langley, J.D. McDuffie, Frank Warren, and Jabe Thomas. This was the biggest racing grid of any race on the site at Langley with 30 drivers competing at the start. However, only twenty of them managed to complete the race.

The top prize of the race was $1,635 ($13,238 when adjusted for inflation) and the prize for thirtieth place was $200 ($1,619 when adjusted for inflation). Total winnings were considered to be $10,015 ($81,090 when adjusted for inflation). Benny Parsons and Bobby Allison were constantly competing for the lead in parts of the race. Most of the vehicles that failed to finish the race were due to problems in their engine.

Roy Tyner would race his final NASCAR Cup series race here while Rodney Bruce would make his only NASCAR Grand National Series appearance.

Notable crew chiefs for this race included Junie Donlavey, Harry Hyde, Lee Gordon and Don Lawrence.

Unfortunately, it would also be the last race ever for Langley Field. Even though the race was more than 300 miles, it was not considered to be modern enough for the evolving vehicles of what would become the NASCAR Winston Cup Series the following year. Many of the "pioneer race courses" did not survive NASCAR's abbreviated schedule as the organizers believed that the older tracks were not modern enough for the faster and newer vehicles.

=== Qualifying ===
Grid	No.	Driver	Manufacturer	Owner
1	72	Benny Parsons	'69 Ford	L.G. DeWitt
2	71	Bobby Isaac	'69 Dodge	Nord Krauskopf
3	90	Bill Dennis	'69 Mercury	Junie Donlavey
4	22	Bobby Allison	'70 Dodge	Bobby Allison
5	48	James Hylton	'70 Ford	James Hylton
6	06	Neil Castles	'69 Dodge	Neil Castles
7	4	John Sears	'69 Dodge	John Sears
8	70	J.D. McDuffie	'69 Mercury	J.D. McDuffie
9	39	Friday Hassler	'69 Chevrolet	James Hanley
10	25	Jabe Thomas	'69 Plymouth	Don Robertson
11	64	Elmo Langley	'69 Mercury	Elmo Langley
12	54	Ben Arnold	'69 Chevrolet	Bill Dennis
13	24	Cecil Gordon	'68 Ford	Cecil Gordon
14	79	Frank Warren	'69 Plymouth	Frank Warren
15	10	Bill Champion	'69 Ford	Bill Champion
16	26	Dave Marcis	'69 Ford	Earl Brooks
17	32	Pete Hamilton	'69 Plymouth	Dick Brooks
18	68	Larry Baumel	'69 Ford	Allan Schlauer
19	74	Bill Shirey	'69 Plymouth	Bill Shirey
20	8	Joe Frasson	'69 Ford	Joe Frasson
21	37	Don Tarr	'69 Dodge	Don Tarr
22	34	Wendell Scott	'69 Ford	Wendell Scott
23	92	Roy Tyner	'69 Chevrolet	Roy Tyner
24	65	Joe Phipps	'69 Chevrolet	Joe Phipps
25	97	Jim Vandiver	'68 Ford	Cecil Gordon
26	19	Henley Gray	'69 Ford	Henley Gray
27	88	Bill Hollar	'69 Ford	Bill Hollar
28	67	Dick May	'69 Ford	Ron Ronacher
29	78	Rodney Bruce	'69 Buick	J.D. McDuffie
30	02	Jimmy Crawford	'69 Plymouth	Crawford Brothers

=== Finishing order ===
1. Bobby Allison (No. 22)
2. Benny Parsons† (No. 72)
3. Pete Hamilton (No. 32)
4. John Sears† (No. 4)
5. James Hylton† (No. 48)
6. Neil Castles (No. 06)
7. Elmo Langley† (No. 64)
8. J.D. McDuffie† (No. 70)
9. Frank Warren (No. 79)
10. Jabe Thomas† (No. 25)
11. Friday Hassler† (No. 39)
12. Bill Champion† (No. 10)
13. Joe Frasson† (No. 8)
14. Jim Vandiver (No. 97)
15. Henley Gray (No. 19)
16. Bill Shirey (No. 74)
17. Rodney Bruce (No. 78)
18. Bill Holar (No. 88)
19. Wendell Scott† (No. 34)
20. Dave Marcis (No. 26)
21. Joe Phipps* (No. 65)
22. Jimmy Crawford*† (No. 02)
23. Bobby Isaac*† (No. 71)
24. Cecil Gordon*† (No. 24)
25. Ben Arnold* (No. 54)
26. Roy Tyner*† (No. 92)
27. Bill Dennis* (No. 90)
28. Larry Baumel* (No. 68)
29. Don Tarr* (No. 37)
30. Dick May*† (No. 67)

† signifies that the driver is known to be deceased
* Driver failed to finish race

=== Timeline ===
Section reference:

- Start of race: Benny Parsons started with the pole position.
- Lap 2: Dick May fell out with engine failure.
- Lap 4: Don Tarr fell out with engine failure.
- Lap 17: Larry Baumel's vehicle developed transmission problems.
- Lap 28: Bill Dennis fell out with engine failure.
- Lap 35: Bobby Allison took over the lead from Benny Parsons.
- Lap 51: Handling issues forced Roy Tyner to exit the race.
- Lap 66: Ben Arnold fell out with engine failure.
- Lap 87: Cecil Gordon managed to lose his vehicle's rear end.
- Lap 106: Bobby Isaac managed to lose his vehicle's rear end.
- Lap 108: Ignition problems forced Jimmy Crawford out of the race.
- Lap 190: Benny Parsons took over the lead from Bobby Allison.
- Lap 196: Transmission issues made Joe Phipps finish outside the "top 20."
- Lap 202: Bobby Allison took over the lead from Benny Parsons.
- Finish: Bobby Allison was officially declared the winner of the event.

== Post-race issues ==
=== Sponsorship ===
After years of not needing a primary sponsor, the Big Tobacco conglomerate R. J. Reynolds Tobacco Company would become the main sponsor the following season with their Winston cigarette brand. Using their once-abundant profit margin they acquired while getting America's adult smokers to use their products on a habitual basis, the new primary sponsor would help bring NASCAR into its "modern era." This would bring about the unintended consequences of non-automotive sponsors into the sport. An increasing level of media coverage outside of the American Deep South would also help to bring the sport into the modern era.

Giveaway products in later years like T-shirts, knives, and cigarette lighters were often used as merchandise items handed out by American variety stores. All the customer had to was purchase a carton of Winston cigarettes and the bonus item would be added free of charge. All other cigarette products would not allow the customer to acquire free NASCAR merchandise because only the Winston brand was considered the official tobacco product of NASCAR. Unlike the more expensive items like jackets, merchandise from the main sponsor often dealt with NASCAR in general and never with a specific driver.

=== Distant changes ===
Reynolds' premier cigarette brand would remain as NASCAR's top sponsor until 2004 when a telecommunications company known as Nextel Communications would take over due to declining North American tobacco sales in the 21st century. This would force the Winston Cup Series (also known as the Winston Cup Grand National Series prior to circa 1985) to change its name to the Nextel Cup Series. Computer games released from 2005 to the present day (i.e., NASCAR 2005: Chase for the Cup, NASCAR SimRacing) were allowed to use the name of NASCAR's premier racing series without having to use an ambiguous title because tobacco was no longer involved in its sponsorship. After a few years, the Nextel company would merge with another telecommunications company to form the Sprint Nextel company. This new corporate sponsor would take over primary sponsorship starting in 2008 (making it necessary to change the name of the Nextel Cup Series into the Sprint Cup Series).

Preceded by 1970 American 500	NASCAR Grand National/Winston Cup Races; 1970-71	Succeeded by 1971 Motor Trend 500

Preceded by 1969 Texas 500	NASCAR season-ending races 1949-present	Succeeded by 1971 Texas 500
