= 1971 Kingsport 300 =

Auto race held at Kingsport Speedway in 1971

Race details
- Race 20 of 48 in the 1971 NASCAR Winston Cup Series season
- Date: May 23, 1971; 53 years ago
- Official name: Kingsport 300
- Location: Kingsport Speedway, Kingsport, Tennessee
- Course: Permanent racing facility
- Course length: 0.545 km (0.337 miles)
- Distance: 300 laps, 101.1 mi (165.7 km)
- Weather: Temperatures of 80.1 °F (26.7 °C); wind speeds of 7 miles per hour (11 km/h)
- Average speed: 63.242 miles per hour (101.778 km/h)
- Attendance: 3,800

Pole position
Driver	Bobby Isaac	K&K Insurance Racing

Most laps led
Driver	Bobby Isaac	K&K Insurance Racing
- Laps: 294

Winner
No. 71	Bobby Isaac	K&K Insurance Racing

Television in the United States
- Network: untelevised
- Announcers: none

The 1971 Kingsport 300 was a NASCAR Winston Cup Series racing event that took place on May 23, 1971, at Kingsport Speedway in Kingsport, Tennessee.

== Race report ==
There were 25 drivers on the starting grid; 13 drivers would fail to finish the race. Bill Hollar would finish in last-place on the first lap due to an issue with his clutch. Bill Champion received his second straight top-five finish. Richard Childress would be involved in a fire during the race while a crash would take D.K. Ulrich out of the race. 300 laps were performed in front of 3,800 live spectators. Bobby Isaac and Richard Petty were exchanging the lead for the entire race.

Isaac would go on to defeat Elmo Langley after more than 90 minutes of racing action; with Harry Hyde as the winner's crew chief. Isaac's qualifying speed of 75.167 miles per hour (120.970 km/h) earned him the pole position for this race. Notable crew chiefs for this race were Harry Hyde, Dale Inman, Vic Ballard and Lee Gordon.

The race car drivers still had to commute to the races using the same stock cars that competed in a typical weekend's race through a policy of homologation (and under their own power). This policy was in effect until roughly 1975. By 1980, NASCAR had completely stopped tracking the year model of all the vehicles and most teams did not take stock cars to the track under their own power anymore.

=== Qualifying ===
Grid	No.	Driver	Manufacturer
1	71	Bobby Isaac	'71 Dodge
2	43	Richard Petty	'71 Plymouth
3	48	James Hylton	'71 Ford
4	10	Bill Champion	'69 Ford
5	72	Benny Parsons	'70 Ford
6	64	Elmo Langley	'71 Ford
7	34	Wendell Scott	'69 Ford
8	06	Neil Castles	'70 Dodge
9	24	Cecil Gordon	'69 Mercury
10	4	John Sears	'69 Dodge
11	25	Jabe Thomas	'70 Plymouth
12	30	Walter Ballard	'71 Ford
13	8	Ed Negre	'69 Ford
14	40	D.K. Ulrich	'70 Ford
15	26	Earl Brooks	'69 Ford
16	45	Bill Seifert	'70 Ford
17	74	Bill Shirey	'69 Plymouth
18	67	Dick May	'69 Ford
19	70	J.D. McDuffie	'69 Chevrolet
20	96	Richard Childress	'71 Chevrolet

== Timeline ==
Section reference:

- Start of race: Bobby Isaac started the race in the pole position.
- Lap 1: Bill Hollar vehicle's developed problems with its clutch.
- Lap 26: An oil leak in J.D. McDuffie's vehicle ended his hopes of winning the race.
- Lap 46: Benny Parsons overheated his engine, forcing him out of the race.
- Lap 72: Richard Childress' vehicle caught on fire.
- Lap 83: Richard Petty takes over the lead from Bobby Isaac.
- Lap 85: The wiring in Earl Brooks' vehicle unravelled itself.
- Lap 87: Henley Gray's battery managed to die off while he was racing.
- Lap 89: Bobby Isaac takes over the lead from Richard Petty.
- Lap 138: Neil Castles slammed on his vehicle's brakes a bit too hard; Charlie Roberts quit the race.
- Lap 166: The rear end of Richard Petty's vehicle managed to peel off.
- Lap 186: D.K. Ulrich had a terminal crash, forcing him to withdraw from the race.
- Lap 194: The rear end of Ken Meisenhelder's vehicle came off in an unsafe manner.
- Lap 200: Transmission problems forced Dick May to exit the race prematurely.
- Lap 238: John Sears had a problem with his vehicle's ignition.
- Finish: Bobby Isaac was officially declared the winner of the event.

== Finishing order ==
1. Bobby Isaac† (No. 71)
2. Elmo Langley† (No. 64)
3. James Hylton† (No. 48)
4. Cecil Gordon† (No. 24)
5. Bill Champion† (No. 10)
6. Wendell Scott† (No. 34)
7. Walter Ballard (No. 30)
8. Jabe Thomas† (No. 25)
9. Bill Shirey (No. 74)
10. Bill Seifert (No. 45)
11. Frank Warren (No. 79)
12. John Sears*† (No. 4)
13. Ed Negre† (No. 8)
14. Dick May*† (No. 67)
15. Ken Meisenhelder* (No. 41)
16. D.K. Ulrich* (No. 40)
17. Richard Petty* (No. 43)
18. Neil Castles* (No. 06)
19. Charlie Roberts* (No. 77)
20. Henley Gray* (No. 19)
21. Earl Brooks*† (No. 26)
22. Richard Childress* (No. 96)
23. Benny Parsons*† (No. 72)
24. J.D. McDuffie*† (No. 70)
25. Bill Hollar*† (No. 28)

† signifies that the driver is known to be deceased
* Driver failed to finish race

Preceded by 1971 Asheville 300	NASCAR Winston Cup Series Season; 1971	Succeeded by 1971 World 600
