= Bill Butts =

American racing driver (born 1937)

- Born: September 3, 1937 (age 89); El Cajon, California, U.S.

NASCAR Cup Series career
- 2 races run over 1 year
- Best finish: 76th (1972)
- First race: 1972 Miller High Life 500 (Ontario)
- Last race: 1972 Golden State 400 (Riverside)
Wins	Top tens	Poles
0	0	0

ARCA Menards Series West career
- 30 races run over 3 years
- Best finish: 11th (1972)
- First race: 1969 Race 19 (San Gabriel)
- Last race: 1973 Cajon Tuborg 150 (Cajon)
Wins	Top tens	Poles
0	11	0
- Statistics up to date as of September 13, 2026.

Bill Butts (born September 3, 1937) is an American former professional stock car racing driver. He primarily competed in the NASCAR Winston West Series, where he ran the complete schedule in 1972.

== Racing career ==
Butts made his NASCAR Pacific Coast Late Model Division debut in 1969, finishing 20th at San Gabriel Valley Speedway due to overheating issues. He returned to the renamed Winston West Series in 1972, competing full-time; qualifying for 28 of the season's 30 races, Butts scored 11 top-tens, with a best finish of second at Umatilla Speedway. He ended the season 11th in the standings. The West schedule included three combination races with the NASCAR Winston Cup Series, where he failed to qualify for the first race at Riverside International Raceway, finished 15th at Ontario Motor Speedway, and finished 20th for the second race at Riverside. Butts made his final NASCAR start in 1973, finishing last in a 20-car field at Cajon Speedway due to engine issues.
