= 1970 American 500 =

Auto race held at North Carolina Motor Speedway in 1970

Race details
- Race 47 of 48 in the 1970 NASCAR Grand National Series season
- Layout of Rockingham Speedway
- Date: November 15, 1970
- Official name: American 500
- Location: North Carolina Motor Speedway, Rockingham, North Carolina
- Course: Permanent racing facility
- Course length: 1.017 miles (1.636 km)
- Distance: 492 laps, 500 mi (804 km)
- Weather: Chilly with temperatures of 65.3 °F (18.5 °C); wind speeds of 12 miles per hour (19 km/h)
- Average speed: 117.811 miles per hour (189.598 km/h)
- Attendance: 20,000

Pole position
| Driver | Charlie Glotzbach | Nichels Engineering |

Most laps led
| Driver | Cale Yarborough | Wood Brothers Racing |
- Laps: 205

Winner
| No. 21 | Cale Yarborough | Wood Brothers Racing |

Television in the United States
- Network: untelevised
- Announcers: none

The 1970 American 500 was a NASCAR Grand National Series event that was held on November 15, 1970, at North Carolina Motor Speedway in Rockingham, North Carolina. Jim Paschal qualified the #40 vehicle for Pete Hamilton.

== Race report ==
Twenty thousand people watched Cale Yarborough win the race which lasted 4 hours, 14 minutes, and 24 seconds. The average speed was 117.811 miles per hour (189.598 km/h) while the pole speed was 136.496 miles per hour (219.669 km/h). There were seven cautions that lasted for forty-six laps and the margin of victory was four seconds. As the penultimate race in NASCAR's Grand National era, this race was crucial for people wanting to win the 1970 NASCAR Grand National Championship. Bobby Isaac finished the race in 7th place, good enough for him to clinch the championship.

492 laps were completed on the paved oval track spanning 1.017 miles (1.637 km). The winner's purse was $20,445 ($169,499 when adjusted for inflation) while last place (40th) paid $540 ($4,145 when adjusted for inflation). Drivers who were eliminated from the race had to deal with engine problems, crashes, transmission problems, and problems with their fan pulley (in addition to their rear end). Pete Hamilton would drive in his final race for Petty Enterprises here while Cale Yarborough would complete his final race for the Wood Brothers. Future winning team owner Hoss Ellington would retire from driving after this race. Cale Yarborough would eventually transfer himself to the USAC Indy Car Series in 1971.

Notable crew chiefs in this race included Herb Nab, Junie Donlavey, Harry Hyde, Dale Inman, Maurice Petty, Tom Vandiver and Banjo Matthews.

=== Qualifying ===
| Grid | No. | Driver | Manufacturer | Speed | Qualifying time | Owner |
|---|---|---|---|---|---|---|
| 1 | 99 | Charlie Glotzbach | '69 Dodge | 136.496 | 26.823 | Ray Nichels |
| 2 | 21 | Cale Yarborough | '69 Mercury | 135.985 | 26.923 | Wood Brothers |
| 3 | 22 | Bobby Allison | '69 Dodge | 135.985 | 27.037 | Mario Rossi |
| 4 | 32 | Dick Brooks | '70 Plymouth | 135.282 | 27.063 | Dick Brooks |
| 5 | 71 | Bobby Isaac | '69 Dodge | 135.072 | 27.105 | Nord Krauskopf |
| 6 | 17 | David Pearson | '69 Ford | 135.052 | 27.109 | Holman-Moody |
| 7 | 43 | Richard Petty | '70 Plymouth | 134.988 | 27.122 | Petty Enterprises |
| 8 | 30 | Dave Marcis | '69 Dodge | 134.196 | 27.282 | Dave Marcis |
| 9 | 6 | Buddy Baker | '69 Dodge | 134.176 | 27.286 | Cotton Owens |
| 10 | 40 | Pete Hamilton | '70 Plymouth | 133.984 | 27.326 | Petty Enterprises |

Failed to qualify: Dick Poling (#65), Roy Mayne (#46)

== Finishing order ==
Section reference:

1. Cale Yarborough Ford
2. David Pearson Mercury
3. Bobby Allison
4. Donnie Allison
5. Buddy Baker
6. Richard Petty
7. Bobby Isaac
8. James Hylton
9. Friday Hassler
10. Buddy Young
11. Joe Frasson
12. Neil Castles
13. Elmo Langley
14. Jabe Thomas
15. Pete Hamilton*
16. Jim Vandiver
17. Ben Arnold
18. J.D. McDuffie
19. Raymond Williams
20. Wendell Scott*
21. Cecil Gordon
22. Johnny Halford
23. Roy Mayne
24. Larry Baumel
25. Bill Champion*
26. Frank Warren
27. Hoss Ellington*
28. Henley Gray
29. LeeRoy Yarbrough*
30. John Sears*
31. Charlie Glotzbach*
32. Dave Marcis*
33. Benny Parsons*
34. Bill Seifert*
35. Tiny Lund*
36. Bill Shirey*
37. Bill Dennis*
38. Roy Tyner*
39. Dick Brooks*
40. Buddy Arrington*

* Driver failed to finish race

== Timeline ==
Section reference:

Charlie Glotzbach
Cale Yarborough
David Pearson
Cale Yarborough
David Pearson
Richard Petty
Cale Yarborough
Cale Yarborough
David Pearson
Cale Yarborough
David Pearson
Cale Yarborough
│
1
│
16
│
31
│
46
│
61
│
76
│
91
│
106
│
121
│
136
│
151
│
166
│
181
│
196
│
211
│
226
│
241
│
256
│
271
│
286
│
301
│
316
│
331
│
346
│
361
│
376
│
391
│
406
│
421
│
436
│
451
│
466
│
481

| Preceded by 1970 Georgia 500 | NASCAR Grand National Season; 1970 | Succeeded by 1970 Tidewater 300 |

| Preceded by 1969 | American 500 races 1970 | Succeeded by 1971 |
