= 1972 Miller High Life 500 =

Auto race held at Ontario Motor Speedway in 1972

Race details
- Race 4 of 31 in the 1972 NASCAR Winston Cup Series season
- Souvenir program of the 1972 Miller High Life 500
- Date: March 5, 1972
- Official name: Miller High Life 500
- Location: Ontario Motor Speedway, Ontario, California
- Course: Permanent racing facility
- Course length: 2.500 miles (4.023 km)
- Distance: 200 laps, 500 mi (804 km)
- Weather: Very hot with temperatures of 82 °F (28 °C); wind speeds of 6 miles per hour (9.7 km/h)
- Average speed: 127.082 miles per hour (204.519 km/h)
- Attendance: 68,498

Pole position
| Driver | A. J. Foyt | Wood Brothers Racing |
- Time: 58.740 seconds

Most laps led
| Driver | A.J. Foyt | Wood Brothers Racing |
- Laps: 132

Winner
| No. 21 | A.J. Foyt | Wood Brothers Racing |

Television in the United States
- Network: ABC
- Announcers: Jim McKay; Jackie Stewart

The 1972 Miller High Life 500 was a NASCAR Winston Cup Series and Winston West Series racing event that took place on March 5, 1972, at Ontario Motor Speedway in Ontario, California.

== Race report ==
Two hundred laps took place on a paved track spanning 2.500 miles (4.023 km); the race was resolved in three hours and fifty-six minutes. With a purse larger than the previous month's Daytona 500, 113 cars were waiting in line to compete in three qualifying sessions to fill the 51-car grid. An unprecedented number of teams failed to qualify for the race.

Given the economic outlook of that era, it was amazing that 113 cars would try to earn a spot on the racing grid (with only a 45% chance of actually qualifying for the race). Clem Proctor won the 100-lap Sportsman race that was held the day before this race in a 1963 Thunderbird. The 1971 winner George Follmer withdrew after his owner had a dispute with the way NASCAR was inspecting the cars, seems like only two cars (Follmer's and Sonny Easley's) were being checked with templates as both were 1968 models and everything else was older. This would be the first of five consecutive races where the pole winner won the race, only time in NASCAR this has happened.

Foyt was ridiculously faster than my Chevy down the straights.

— Bobby Allison

A. J. Foyt defeated Bobby Allison by 4.2 seconds in front of nearly 69,000 live spectators. This victory would be as equally impressive as his wins at the 1964 Firecracker 400 and the 1972 Daytona 500. The pole position was achieved by the race winner qualifying at a speed of 153.217 miles per hour (246.579 km/h). Four cautions slowed the race for 31 laps and the average racing speed was 127.082 miles per hour (204.519 km/h). Jim Vandiver would earn the last-place finish due to an engine issue on the very first lap of the race. Country music legend Marty Robbins would compete in this race in a 1972 Dodge Charger vehicle; he started in 22nd and ended in 8th place. After the race, Robbins was named as the "Sportsman of the Race." The winner's purse for the 1972 Miller High Life 500 was $31,695 ($243,953.16 when adjusted for inflation).

Drivers that made what would be their final start in NASCAR's top series were: Cliff Garner, Ron Gautsche, Les Loeser, and Don White. The drivers who commenced their NASCAR Cup Series careers during this race were: Carl Adams, Bill Butts, former USAC Championship Car series driver George Follmer, and Jim Whitt. Follmer would eventually go back to USAC Championship Car racing for its 1974 season.

Notable crew chiefs who actively participated in the race were Richard Elder, Junie Donvaley, Harry Hyde, Dale Inman, and Tom Vandiver.

=== Qualifying ===
| Grid | No. | Driver | Manufacturer | Qualifying time | Speed | Owner |
|---|---|---|---|---|---|---|
| 1 | 21 | A. J. Foyt | '71 Mercury | 58.740 | 153.217 | Wood Brothers |
| 2 | 12 | Bobby Allison | '72 Chevrolet | 58.983 | 152.586 | Richard Howard |
| 3 | 43 | Richard Petty | '72 Plymouth | 59.374 | 151.581 | Petty Enterprises |
| 4 | 11 | Buddy Baker | '72 Dodge | 59.602 | 151.001 | Petty Enterprises |
| 5 | 71 | Bobby Isaac | '72 Dodge | 59.605 | 150.994 | Nord Krauskopf |
| 6 | 97 | Red Farmer | '72 Ford | 1:00.520 | 148.711 | Willie Humphreys |
| 7 | 16 | Mark Donohue | '72 AMC Matador | 1:00.778 | 148.079 | Roger Penske |
| 8 | 96W | Ray Elder | '72 Dodge | 1:01.012 | 147.511 | Fred Elder |
| 9 | 72 | Benny Parsons | '71 Mercury | 1:01.057 | 147.403 | L.G. DeWitt |
| 10 | 9 | Ramo Stott | '72 Plymouth | 1:01.567 | 146.182 | Jack Housby |

Failed to qualify: Pat Fay (#99), Bill Shirey (#74), Perry Cottingham (#73), Dale Lee (#65), Tru Cheek (#62), Don Graham (#57W), Ken Shoemaker (#56), Jerry Barnett (#55), John Fairchild (#50), Sam Stanley (#47W), Bill Seifert (#45), D.K. Ulrich (#40), George Wiltshire (#39), Jimmy Insolo (#38), Joe Frasson (#78), Marion Collins (#78W), Dick May (#84), Richard Childress (#96), Harry Jefferson (#94), Larry Smith (#92), Verlin Eaker (#91), Richard D. Brown (#91), Bill Dennis (#90), Clint Hutchins (#89W), Les Covey (#89), Mike Saint (#88W), Ron Keselowski (#88), Allen Jennings (#86), Dan Geiger (#85), Harry Schilling (#84W), Don Tarr (#37), Frank Burnett (#36), Ed Negre (#8), Bob England (#8W), Steve Pfeifer (#08), Ivan Baldwin (#07), Charlie Glotzbach (#6), Jerry Oliver (#6W), Neil Castles (#06), Doc Faustina (#5), John Sears (#4), Emiliano Zapata (#04), Tommy Gale (#03), Johnny Steele (#2), Frank James (#00W), John Lyons (#9), Phillip Pedlar (#11W), Larry Esau (#12W), Bub Strickler (#35), Gene Riniker (#34W), Wendell Scott (#34), Glenn Francis (#33), Johnny Halford (#32), Carl Joiner (#26), Chuck Hetrick (#25W), Jabe Thomas (#25), Jim Gilliam (#24W), Nels Miller (#21W), Paul Dorrity (#15), Arnie Krueger (#14W), Willie McNeal (#14), Bobby Mausgrover (#00)

== Finishing order ==
Section reference:

1. A.J. Foyt
2. Bobby Allison
3. Buddy Baker
4. Richard Petty
5. Ray Elder
6. Hershel McGriff
7. James Hylton
8. Marty Robbins
9. Elmo Langley
10. Ramo Stott
11. Jimmy Finger
12. Jack McCoy
13. John Soares, Jr.
14. Benny Parsons
15. Bill Butts
16. Cliff Garner
17. Johnny Anderson
18. Dick Bown
19. Jim Danielson
20. Bill Champion
21. Ben Arnold
22. Kevin Terris
23. J.D. McDuffie
24. Mike James
25. Dean Dalton
26. Raymond Williams
27. Jim Whitt
28. George Altheide
29. Bob Kauf
30. Carl Adams
31. Henley Gray
32. Charlie Roberts
33. Chuck Bown
34. Les Loeser, Jr.
35. Ron Gautsche
36. Cecil Gordon
37. Dick Kranzler
38. Don White
39. Gene Romero
40. G.T. Tallas
41. Red Farmer
42. Earle Canavan
43. Frank Warren
44. Mark Donohue
45. Bobby Isaac
46. Bill Osborne
47. Walter Ballard
48. Don Noel
49. George Follmer
50. David Ray Boggs
51. Jim Vandiver

== Timeline ==
Section reference:

- Start: A.J. Foyt had the pole position as the green flag was waved in the air.
- Lap 6: George Follmer blew his vehicle's engine; starting a caution which ended on lap 16.
- Lap 37: Walter Ballard had a terminal crash on turn three; caution ended on lap 41.
- Lap 47: Mark Donohue and Bobby Isaac had an accident on turn one; caution ended on lap 55.
- Lap 150: Cecil Gordon had a terminal crash on turn four; caution ended on lap 155.
- Finish: A.J. Foyt was officially declared the winner of the event.

| Preceded by 1972 Richmond 500 | NASCAR Winston Cup Series Season; 1972 | Succeeded by 1972 Carolina 500 |

| Preceded by 1971 | Miller High Life 500 races 1972 | Succeeded by none (postponed until 1974) |
