= 1971 World 600 =

Auto race held at Charlotte Motor Speedway in 1971

Race details
- Race 21 of 48 in the 1971 NASCAR Winston Cup Series season
- Official poster for the 1971 World 600
- Date: May 30, 1971
- Official name: World 600
- Location: Charlotte Motor Speedway, Concord, North Carolina
- Course: Permanent racing facility
- Course length: 1.500 miles (2.410 km)
- Distance: 400 laps, 600 mi (965 km)
- Weather: Temperatures of 66 °F (19 °C); wind speeds up to 13 miles per hour (21 km/h)
- Average speed: 140.422 miles per hour (225.987 km/h)
- Attendance: 78,000

Pole position
Driver	Charlie Glotzbach	Richard Howard

Most laps led
Driver	Bobby Allison	Holman Moody
- Laps: 303

Winner
No. 12	Bobby Allison	Holman Moody

Television in the United States
- Network: untelevised
- Announcers: none

The 1971 World 600, the 12th running of the event, was a NASCAR Winston Cup Series racing event that took place on May 30, 1971, at Charlotte Motor Speedway in Concord, North Carolina. It marked the return of Chevrolet to NASCAR.

Chevrolet would go on to dominate NASCAR during the subsequent decades.

== Qualifying ==
Grid	No.	Driver	Manufacturer
1	3	Charlie Glotzbach	'71 Chevrolet
2	12	Bobby Allison	'69 Mercury
3	71	Bobby Isaac	'71 Dodge
4	99	Fred Lorenzen	'71 Plymouth
5	43	Richard Petty	'71 Plymouth
6	6	Pete Hamilton	'71 Plymouth
7	22	Dick Brooks	'70 Dodge
8	11	Buddy Baker	'71 Dodge
9	91	Speedy Thompson	'71 Chevrolet
10	31	Jim Vandiver	'70 Dodge
11	14	Jim Paschal	'71 Chevrolet
12	2	Dave Marcis	'69 Dodge
13	21	Donnie Allison	'69 Mercury
14	33	David Pearson	'71 Pontiac
15	72	Benny Parsons	'69 Mercury

== Summary ==
There were 40 drivers in this 400-lap race; Walter Ballard received the last place finish due to a crash on the eleventh lap. The race took more than four hours to complete. There were 13 lead changes and three caution period for 24 laps. Charlotte Motor Speedway had just gone bankrupt a year earlier and the district judge assigned ownership of the floundering track to Mr. Richard Howard; who owned a furniture store in the area. He came up with the idea of having two pace cars advertise his furniture at this race and at the 1971 National 500. As a result, the speedway managed to recover and it still hosts Cup Series races to this day.

Bobby Allison defeated Donnie Allison by 34 seconds in front of an audience of 78000; starting the first of five consecutive wins for Bobby Allison. Charlie Glotzbach won the pole position with a speed of 157.788 miles per hour (253.935 km/h) while the average race speed was 140.422 miles per hour (225.987 km/h). The other finishers in the top ten were: Pete Hamilton, Richard Petty, Fred Lorenzen, Buddy Baker, Benny Parsons, Friday Hassler (the fastest Chevrolet driver), Dave Marcis and Dick Brooks.

Notable crew chiefs for the race were Paul Goldsmith, Junie Donlavey, Harry Hyde, Dale Inman, Tom Vandiver, and Lee Gordon.

Speedy Thompson made his last start of his NASCAR Cup Series career and would finish in 16th place despite being absent from the NASCAR Winston Cup Series for nearly nine years. Larry Smith would begin his tragically short NASCAR career during this race; resulting in a 22nd-place finish. One of the most eagerly anticipated races ever as it marked the first competitive entry of a Junior Johnson-owned Chevy. Chevrolet had gone several years without a win in the Grand National division and nearly ended that dry spell in this race. Glotzbach was running strong when he tangled with the lapped car of Thompson and crashed on lap 234, ending his day.

Kevin Terris tried to qualify for this race in a Plymouth Road Runner, but he failed to qualify.

=== Timeline ===
Section reference:

- Start of race: Bobby Allison emerged the ahead of the pack as the green flag was waved.
- Lap 6: Charlie Glotzbach took over the lead from Bobby Allison.
- Lap 11: Walter Ballard had a terminal crash.
- Lap 17: Dave Marcis took over the lead from Charlie Glotzbach, Charlie Roberts' engine stopped working.
- Lap 24: James Hylton took over the lead from Dave Marcis.
- Lap 25: Bobby Allison took over the lead from James Hylton.
- Lap 60: G.C. Spencer's engine stopped working.
- Lap 77: Buddy Baker took over the lead from Bobby Allison.
- Lap 79: Bobby Allison took over the lead from Buddy Baker.
- Lap 92: Charlie Glotzbach took over the lead from Bobby Allison.
- Lap 94: An oil leak occurred in David Pearson's vehicle.
- Lap 98: Bobby Allison took over the lead from Charlie Glotzbach.
- Lap 137: Charlie Glotzbach took over the lead from Bobby Allison.
- Lap 160: Bobby Isaac's radiator acted strangely.
- Lap 175: Bobby Allison took over the lead from Charlie Glotzbach.
- Lap 195: Charlie Glotzbach took over the lead from Bobby Allison.
- Lap 211: Raymond Williams' engine stopped working.
- Lap 227: Bobby Allison took over the lead from Charlie Glotzbach.
- Lap 234: Charlie Glotzbach had a terminal crash.
- Lap 330: Richard D. Brown had a terminal crash.
- Finish: Bobby Allison was officially declared the winner of the event.

Preceded by 1971 Kingsport 300	NASCAR Winston Cup Series Season; 1971	Succeeded by 1971 Mason-Dixon 500

Preceded by 1970	World 600 races 1971	Succeeded by 1972
