= Jimmy Crawford (racing driver) =

Former NASCAR driver (1944–2007)

- Born: July 12, 1944; East Point, Georgia, U.S.
- Died: May 6, 2007 (aged 62)
- Cause of death: Heart failure

NASCAR Cup Series career
- 15 races run over 5 years
- Best finish: 43rd - 1971 NASCAR Winston Cup Series season
- First race: 1970 Qualifier #2 (Daytona International Speedway)
- Last race: 1974 Dixie 500 (Atlanta International Raceway)
Wins	Top tens	Poles
0	0	0

Jimmy Crawford (July 12, 1944 – May 26, 2007) was an American NASCAR Winston Cup Series driver who raced in 15 different races in his five-year career (1970–1974).

== Career ==
While failing to win a race, Crawford managed to experience 3,421.1 miles (5,505.7 km) of top-level stock car racing. Originally an airline pilot for Eastern Airlines, Crawford briefly participated in the world of stock car automobiles but he later gave his ride to Donnie Allison and eventually to Pete Hamilton for his final NASCAR race. His total earnings as a NASCAR driver would add up to $15,089 ($98,506.12 when considering inflation).
