= 1971 Winston 500 =

Auto race held at Talladega Superspeedway in 1971

Race details
- Race 18 of 48 in the 1971 NASCAR Winston Cup Series season
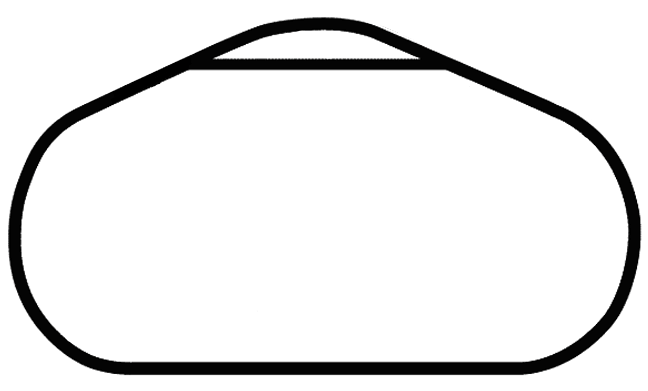
- Layout of Talladega Superspeedway
- Date: May 16, 1971
- Official name: Winston 500
- Location: Alabama International Motor Speedway, Talladega, Alabama
- Course: Permanent racing facility
- Course length: 2.660 miles (4.280 km)
- Distance: 188 laps, 500.1 mi (804.8 km)
- Weather: Temperatures of 78.1 °F (25.6 °C); wind speeds of 6 miles per hour (9.7 km/h)
- Average speed: 147.419 miles per hour (237.248 km/h)
- Attendance: 29,000

Pole position
Driver	Donnie Allison	Wood Brothers

Most laps led
Driver	Bobby Allison	Holman-Moody
- Laps: 70

Winner
No. 21	Donnie Allison	Wood Brothers

Television in the United States
- Network: ABC
- Announcers: Keith Jackson; Chris Economaki

The 1971 Winston 500 was a NASCAR Winston Cup Series race that took place on May 16, 1971, at Alabama International Motor Speedway (now Talladega Superspeedway) in Talladega, Alabama.

George Altheide, Doc Faustina and David Sisco would make their NASCAR Winston Cup Series debuts in this race.

== Background ==
Talladega Superspeedway, originally known as Alabama International Motor Superspeedway (AIMS), is a motorsports complex located north of Talladega, Alabama. It is located on the former Anniston Air Force Base in the small city of Lincoln. The track is a Tri-oval and was constructed by International Speedway Corporation, a business controlled by the France family, in the 1960s. Talladega is most known for its steep banking and the unique location of the start/finish line - located just past the exit to pit road. The track currently hosts the NASCAR series such as the NASCAR Cup Series, NASCAR Xfinity Series, and the NASCAR Truck Series. Talladega Superspeedway is the longest NASCAR oval with a length of 2.66 miles (4.28 km), and the track at its peak had a seating capacity of 175,000 spectators.

== Qualifying ==
Grid	No.	Driver	Manufacturer
1	21	Donnie Allison	'69 Mercury
2	71	Dave Marcis	'71 Dodge
3	12	Bobby Allison	'69 Mercury
4	99	Fred Lorenzen	'71 Plymouth
5	43	Richard Petty	'71 Plymouth
6	6	Pete Hamilton	'71 Plymouth
7	11	Buddy Baker	'71 Dodge
8	33	David Pearson	'71 Pontiac
9	90	Bill Dennis	'69 Mercury
10	48	James Hylton	'70 Ford
11	79	Frank Warren	'69 Dodge
12	10	Bill Champion	'70 Ford
13	24	Cecil Gordon	'69 Mercury
14	03	Tommy Gale	'69 Mercury
15	88	Ron Keselowski	'70 Dodge
16	60	Maynard Troyer	'69 Mercury
17	39	Friday Hassler	'69 Chevrolet
18	70	J.D. McDuffie	'69 Mercury
19	47	Raymond Williams	'71 Ford
20	76	Ben Arnold	'69 Ford

== Race report ==
Twenty-nine thousand people saw Donnie Allison (racing for the Wood Brothers racing team) defeat his brother Bobby (racing for Holman-Moody) by six car lengths in the first official race for new sponsor Winston. Both of them were driving 1969 Mercury Cyclones. The race took three hours and thirty-two minutes to complete. Seven cautions slowed the race for forty-five laps.

Other finishers in the top ten included: Buddy Baker (driving for Petty Enterprises), Pete Hamilton, Fred Lorenzen, Jim Vandiver, James Hylton, Bill Dennis, Dave Marcis, and Larry Baumel. There were 45 lead changes between four drivers and Dave Marcis made his first race using #71. Marcis was a contender for the win until his engine blew on lap 181.

Notable drivers in the race included: Richard Petty, J.D. McDuffie, Coo Coo Marlin, Benny Parsons, Neil Castles, and Ron Keselowski (uncle of current NASCAR driver Brad Keselowski). Bobby Isaac was hospitalized and could not compete in the race due to kidney stones.

The prize purse was $145,040 ($1,153,050.12 when adjusted for inflation); Donnie Allison received $31,140 for winning ($247,559.16 when adjusted for inflation) while last-place finisher Bub Strickler got $1,000 ($7,949.88 when adjusted for inflation).

Preceded by 1971 Halifax County 100	NASCAR Winston Cup Series Races; 1971	Succeeded by 1971 Asheville 300

Preceded by debut	Winston 500 races 1971	Succeeded by 1972
