= 1972 Rebel 400 =

NASCAR race at Darlington

Race details
- Race 8 of 31 in the 1972 NASCAR Winston Cup Series season
- 1972 Rebel 400 program cover
- Date: April 16, 1972
- Official name: Rebel 400
- Location: Darlington Raceway, Darlington, South Carolina
- Course: Permanent racing facility
- Course length: 1.366 miles (2.198 km)
- Distance: 293 laps, 400.238 mi (644.121 km)
- Average speed: 124.406 mph (200.212 km/h)

Pole position
Driver	David Pearson	Wood Brothers Racing

Most laps led
Driver	David Pearson	Wood Brothers Racing
- Laps: 202

Winner
No. 21	David Pearson	Wood Brothers Racing

The 1972 Rebel 400 was a NASCAR Winston Cup Series event that was held on April 16, 1972, at Darlington Speedway in Darlington, South Carolina.

== Race results ==
Fin	St	#	Driver	Sponsor	Make	Laps	Led	Status	Pts
1	1	21	David Pearson	Purolator	'71 Mercury	293	202	running	
2	3	43	Richard Petty	STP	'72 Plymouth	292	27	running	
3	15	18	Joe Frasson	Mario Frasson Cement Co.	'71 Dodge	285	0	running	
4	9	72	Benny Parsons	Pop Kola	'71 Mercury	284	0	running	
5	10	48	James Hylton	Pop Kola	'71 Ford	281	0	running	
6	12	67	Buddy Arrington		'71 Dodge	279	0	running	
7	2	12	Bobby Allison	Coca-Cola	'72 Chevrolet	278	29	running	
8	22	4	John Sears	J. Marvin Mills Heating & Air	'70 Plymouth	277	0	running	
9	27	25	Jabe Thomas	Don Robertson	'70 Plymouth	275	0	running	
10	11	24	Cecil Gordon		'71 Mercury	274	0	running	
11	30	10	Bill Champion		'71 Ford	269	0	running	
12	19	7	Dean Dalton		'71 Mercury	269	0	running	
13	26	64	Elmo Langley		'71 Ford	262	0	running	
14	36	47	Raymond Williams		'71 Ford	262	0	running	
15	28	77	Charlie Roberts		'71 Ford	261	0	running	
16	5	31	Jim Vandiver	O.L. Nixon	'70 Dodge	260	6	engine	
17	21	76	Ben Arnold		'71 Ford	258	0	running	
18	23	30	Walter Ballard	Ballard Racing	'71 Mercury	258	0	running	
19	34	70	J.D. McDuffie		'71 Chevrolet	255	0	running	
20	7	11	Buddy Baker	STP	'72 Dodge	242	27	engine	
21	33	79	Frank Warren		'70 Dodge	222	0	oil pan	
22	13	90	Jackie Oliver	Truck Equipment Corporation	'72 Ford	205	0	crash	
23	35	23	Bill Dennis	Don Robertson	'70 Plymouth	196	0	engine	
24	24	8	Ed Negre		'70 Dodge	178	0	rear end	
25	18	2	Dave Marcis	IHRA Drag Races	'70 Dodge	154	0	handling	
26	8	15	LeeRoy Yarbrough	Bud Moore	'72 Ford	145	1	valve	
27	31	00	Bobby Mausgrover		'70 Dodge	129	0	brakes	
28	4	71	Bobby Isaac	K & K Insurance	'71 Dodge	76	1	piston	
29	6	28	Fred Lorenzen	Lemon Tree Inn	'72 Ford	46	0	engine	
30	14	93	Buck Baker	Harold Furr	'70 Chevrolet	45	0	clutch	
31	29	06	Neil Castles		'70 Dodge	43	0	oil leak	
32	25	53	H.B. Bailey	Hopper-Crews	'72 Ford	41	0	ignition	
33	16	92	Larry Smith	Harley Smith	'71 Ford	36	0	suspension	
34	17	19	Henley Gray		'72 Ford	25	0	oil pressure	
35	20	66	Dick Brooks	Blank & Kalashian	'71 Pontiac	21	0	brakes	
36	32	49	G.C. Spencer		'70 Plymouth	7	0	oil pressure	
