= Larry Baumel =

Former NASCAR driver

- Born: Lawrence A. Baumel; May 26, 1944; Sparta, Wisconsin, U.S.
- Died: May 19, 2023 (aged 78); Mulder Health Care Center, West Salem, Wisconsin, U.S.

NASCAR Cup Series career
- 45 races run over 3 years
- Best finish: 32nd – 1970 NASCAR Grand National Series season
- First race: 1969 untitled race (Savannah Speedway)
- Last race: 1971 Delaware 500 (Dover Downs International Speedway)
Wins	Top tens	Poles
0	2	1

Larry Baumel (May 26, 1944 - May 19, 2023) was a NASCAR Cup Series driver whose career spanned from 1969 to 1971.

== Career ==
Baumel has raced 5940 laps of racing; equivalent to 7,376.3 miles (11,871.0 km) of racing. His average start was 24th place while his average finish was 25th. Baumel's total career earnings is $30,315 ($241,000.51 when adjusted for inflation) and has three last-place finishes. He also raced in the Late Model Stock Car Series in addition to the USAC Stock Car series and the NASCAR Grand National Series. His main sponsor throughout most of his career was Auto Lad and his favorite racing number was #68.
