= 1972 Winston 500 =

Auto race held at Talladega Superspeedway in 1972

Race details
- Race 11 of 31 in the 1972 NASCAR Winston Cup Series season
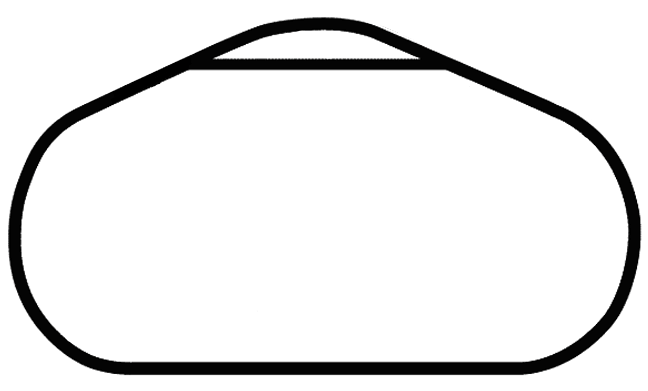
- Layout of Talladega Superspeedway
- Date: May 7, 1972
- Official name: Winston 500
- Location: Alabama International Motor Speedway, Talladega, Alabama
- Course: Permanent racing facility
- Course length: 2.660 miles (4.281 km)
- Distance: 188 laps, 500.08 mi (804.801 km)
- Weather: 75 °F (24 °C); wind speeds of 6 miles per hour (9.7 km/h)
- Average speed: 134.4 mph (216.3 km/h)

Pole position
Driver	Bobby Isaac	K&K Insurance Racing
- Time: 49.764 seconds

Most laps led
Driver	David Pearson	Wood Brothers Racing
- Laps: 59

Winner
No. 21	David Pearson	Wood Brothers Racing

Television in the United States
- Network: ABC
- Announcers: Keith Jackson; Chris Economaki

The 1972 Winston 500 was a NASCAR Winston Cup Series race on May 7, 1972, at Alabama International Motor Speedway in Talladega, Alabama. This was the first start for three-time Cup Series Champion Darrell Waltrip.

== Background ==
Talladega Superspeedway, originally known as Alabama International Motor Superspeedway (AIMS), is a motorsports complex located north of Talladega, Alabama. It is located on the former Anniston Air Force Base in the small city of Lincoln. The track is a Tri-oval and was constructed by International Speedway Corporation, a business controlled by the France Family, in the 1960s. Talladega is most known for its steep banking and the unique location of the start/finish line - located just past the exit to pit road. The track currently hosts the NASCAR series such as the Monster Energy Cup Series, Xfinity Series, and the Camping World Truck Series. Talladega Superspeedway is the longest NASCAR oval with a length of 2.66 miles (4.28 km), and the track at its peak had a seating capacity of 175,000 spectators.

== Race report ==
The grand marshal for the event was Auburn football head coach, Ralph "Shug" Jordan.

There were fifty drivers on the grid. It took three hours and forty-five minutes for 188 laps of racing. There were nine cautions for 62 laps with 53 lead changes. David Pearson defeated Bobby Isaac by almost five seconds. More than 71,000 people would see 500.08 miles or 804.80 kilometres of racing action with an average speed of 134.4 miles per hour (216.3 km/h).

Bobby Isaac would win the pole position at 192.428 miles per hour (309.683 km/h) during qualifying. There were many mechanical failures in the race including the rear end failures and an incident involving a windshield. Country music star Marty Robbins dropped out of the race after 179 laps; after his top speed proved to be substantially faster than that he achieved in qualifying and being in position to pass the leaders, he confessed to altering his restrictor plate and was disqualified and listed as finishing in last place, declining Rookie of the Race honors. Other notable drivers were: Richard Petty, LeeRoy Yarbrough, Elmo Langley, Coo Coo Marlin, and Neil Castles. Darrell Waltrip would make his NASCAR debut in this race and finish in 38th after starting 25th. Clarence Lovell would also make his introduction to NASCAR during this race.

Had Bobby Allison not had this one bad finish here at Talladega, he would've had 20 top-10 finishes in a row.

Notable crew chiefs for this race were Jake Elder, Steven Gray, Harry Hyde, Dale Inman, Tom Vandiver and Herb Nab. Inman, Hyde, and Wood would help maintain the vehicles for the winner, the runner-up, and the fifth-place finisher of this race.

James Hylton would lose his points lead to Richard Petty after this race. The winner of the race would receive $23,745 in total winnings ($182,763 when adjusted for inflation) while the last-place finisher won $745 for a disqualification ($5,734 when adjusted for inflation).

=== Qualifying ===
Grid	No.	Driver	Manufacturer	Owner
1	71	Bobby Isaac	'72 Dodge	Nord Krauskopf
2	21	David Pearson	'71 Mercury	Wood Brothers
3	43	Richard Petty	'72 Dodge	Petty Enterprises
4	12	Bobby Allison	'72 Chevrolet	Richard Howard
5	11	Buddy Baker	'72 Dodge	Petty Enterprises
6	27	Donnie Allison	'72 Chevrolet	Monty Myers
7	97	Red Farmer	'72 Ford	Willie Humphries
8	79	Frank Warren	'70 Dodge	Frank Warren
9	42	Marty Robbins	'72 Dodge	Marty Robbins
10	30	Walter Ballard	'71 Mercury	Vic Ballard
11	3	Jimmy Crawford	'72 Plymouth	Crawford Brothers
12	31	Jim Vandiver	'70 Dodge	O.L. Nixon
13	05	David Sisco	'72 Chevrolet	Charlie McGee
14	24	Cecil Gordon	'71 Mercury	Cecil Gordon
15	8	Ed Negre	'70 Dodge	Ed Negre
16	76	Ben Arnold	'71 Ford	Ben Arnold
17	92	Larry Smith	'71 Ford	Harley Smith
18	91	Richard D. Brown	'72 Chevrolet	Ralph McNabb
19	7	Dean Dalton	'71 Mercury	Dean Dalton
20	93	Buck Baker	'72 Chevrolet	Harold Furr

== Top 20 finishers ==
Pos	No.	Driver	Manufacturer	Laps	Laps led	Time/Status
1	21	David Pearson	Mercury	188	59	3:43:15
2	71	Bobby Isaac	Dodge	188	57	+4.9 seconds
3	11	Buddy Baker	Dodge	188	32	Lead lap under green flag
4	28	Fred Lorenzen	Ford	188	4	Lead lap under green flag
5	43	Richard Petty	Dodge	187	14	+1 lap
6	18	Joe Frasson	Dodge	186	0	+2 laps
7	45	LeeRoy Yarbrough	Mercury	185	0	+3 laps
8	98	Dick Brooks	Ford	185	0	+3 laps
9	79	Frank Warren	Dodge	185	0	+3 laps
10	72	Benny Parsons	Dodge	184	0	+4 laps
11	2	Dave Marcis	Dodge	183	0	+5 laps
12	57	David Ray Boggs	Dodge	182	0	+6 laps
13	25	Jabe Thomas	Plymouth	182	0	+6 laps
14	24	Cecil Gordon	Mercury	182	0	+6 laps
15	8	Ed Negre	Plymouth	182	0	+6 laps
16	3	Jimmy Crawford	Ford	181	0	Terminal vehicle damage
17	76	Ben Arnold	Ford	180	0	Out of gas
18	88	Ron Keselowski	Dodge	179	0	Running
19	30	Walter Ballard	Mercury	179	0	Running
20	92	Larry Smith	Ford	178	0	Running

Preceded by 1972 Virginia 500	NASCAR Winston Cup Series Season; 1972	Succeeded by 1972 World 600

Preceded by 1971	Winston 500 races 1972	Succeeded by 1973
