= Junie Donlavey =

American stock car racer

Personal information
- Born: April 8, 1924 Richmond, Virginia, U.S.
- Died: June 9, 2014 (aged 90) Richmond, Virginia, U.S.

Sport
- Country: United States
- Sport: NASCAR Winston Cup Series
- Team: Donlavey Racing

Wesley Christian "Junie" Donlavey Jr. (April 8, 1924 – June 9, 2014), a native of Richmond, Virginia, was the owner of Donlavey Racing; he began fielding the team in 1950. He drove for his team at first, but soon gave way to other drivers. Donlavey earned a reputation as working well with young drivers over his tenure, as Ken Schrader and Jody Ridley won NASCAR Rookie of the Year honors while driving for Donlavey. Donlavey served in the United States Navy during the 1940s. Afterwards, Donlavey started his own auto repair business, and began to develop an interest in racing. He was inducted into the International Motorsports Hall of Fame in 2007.

Donlavey closed his racing team after the 2004 season when Andy Hillenburg failed to qualify for the Daytona 500; in 2006, he stated that he still had several cars in his race shop, but was in the process of selling them and had no plans to return to racing. He died in Richmond, Virginia on June 9, 2014, at the age of 90. His age of death is ironic, but very fitting in some aspects, because 90 was the number that Donlavey raced with for his team from 1950 to 2002.

Donlavey was honored shortly after his death by the Sprint Cup Garage at Richmond International Raceway being named the Wesley C. Donlavey Garage. At the September 2014 Cup race in Richmond, team owner Joe Falk changed the number of his Circle Sport car from 33 to 90 and used a retro paint scheme similar to Donlavey's Truxmore-sponsored cars. The deck lid contained the names of the 67 drivers who raced for Donlavey. Falk considered Donlavey a mentor.

== See also ==
- Donlavey Racing
