= 1971 Asheville 300 =

Auto race held at New Asheville Speedway in 1971

Race details
- Race 19 of 48 in the 1971 NASCAR Winston Cup Series season
- Date: May 21, 1971; 53 years ago
- Official name: Asheville 300
- Location: New Asheville Speedway, Asheville, North Carolina
- Course: Permanent racing facility
- Course length: 0.535 km (0.333 miles)
- Distance: 300 laps, 99.9 mi (160.7 km)
- Weather: Mild with temperatures of 73.9 °F (23.3 °C); wind speeds of 15 miles per hour (24 km/h)
- Average speed: 71.231 miles per hour (114.635 km/h)
- Attendance: 4,500

Pole position
Driver	Richard Petty	Petty Enterprises

Most laps led
Driver	Richard Petty	Petty Enterprises
- Laps: 252

Winner
No. 43	Richard Petty	Petty Enterprises

Television in the United States
- Network: untelevised
- Announcers: none

The 1971 Asheville 300 was a NASCAR Winston Cup Series racing event that took place on May 21, 1971, at New Asheville Speedway in Asheville, North Carolina.

This race marked the Cup series' return to New Asheville Speedway after an absence of just under three years but it would be the series' final race here as the trimmed down schedule in 1972 eliminated this event. Richard Petty won the prior race in 1968 and won again here with little challenge.

== Race report ==
Seventeen drivers started the race; seven of them parked over the course of the race (including tenth-place finisher Bill Shirey), due to concerns regarding prize money for independent teams. The other DNFs were due to engine, brake problems, in addition to problems with the ignition system. After nearly one and a half hours of racing 300 laps, Richard Petty scored a relatively easy victory over Elmo Langley by a distance of four laps. This was the last time Elmo Langley led a race.

Because Richard Petty only had to contend with 16 other drivers and the race was less than three hours long, this race is not comparable to the wins that were experienced in the NASCAR races of the current era.

Dale Inman was the winning crew chief of this race. Other notable crew chiefs who actively participated in the race were Vic Ballard and Lee Gordon.

An audience of 4500 people saw four different lead changes, no caution periods along with Petty and Langley constantly fight it out for the lead. Like the 1959 Daytona 500, the 1969 Motor Trend 500 and the 1971 Space City 300, this race is considered to be one of NASCAR's infrequently occurring "perfect games." Petty would qualify for pole position driving speeds up to 79.598 miles per hour (128.101 km/h) during solo qualifying sessions.

Ironically, the circumstances of this race yielded Dick May's career-best finish in Winston Cup racing, in spite of the fact that he parked halfway through the event.

The drivers earned very little for participating in this race compared to the multimillion-dollar purses of today; Petty earned a meager $1,500 ($11,646.26 when adjusted for inflation) while last-place finisher Hylton walked away only $220 wealthier ($1,708.12 when adjusted for inflation).

=== Qualifying ===
Grid	No.	Driver	Manufacturer	Owner
1	43	Richard Petty	'71 Plymouth	Petty Enterprises
2	64	Elmo Langley	'69 Mercury	Elmo Langley
3	24	Cecil Gordon	'69 Mercury	Cecil Gordon
4	48	James Hylton	'71 Ford	James Hylton
5	06	Neil Castles	'70 Dodge	Neil Castles
6	34	Wendell Scott	'69 Ford	Wendell Scott
7	10	Bill Champion	'69 Ford	Bill Champion
8	72	Benny Parsons	'70 Ford	L.G. DeWitt
9	74	Bill Shirey	'69 Plymouth	Bill Shirey
10	25	Jabe Thomas	'69 Plymouth	Don Robertson
11	30	Walter Ballard	'71 Ford	Vic Ballard
12	79	Frank Warren	'69 Plymouth	Frank Warren
13	4	John Sears	'69 Dodge	John Sears
14	26	Earl Brooks	'69 Ford	Earl Brooks
15	67	Dick May	'69 Ford	Ron Ronacher
16	8	Ed Negre	'69 Ford	Ed Negre
17	70	J.D. McDuffie	'69 Mercury	J.D. McDuffie

== Finishing order ==
1. Richard Petty (No. 43)
2. Elmo Langley† (No. 64)
3. Cecil Gordon† (No. 24)
4. Jabe Thomas† (No. 25)
5. Bill Champion† (No. 10)
6. Dick May*† (No. 67)
7. J.D. McDuffie*† (No. 70)
8. Earl Brooks*† (No. 26)
9. Frank Warren* (No. 79)
10. Bill Shirey* (No. 74)
11. John Sears*† (No. 4)
12. Benny Parsons*† (No. 72)
13. Walter Ballard* (No. 30)
14. Wendell Scott*† (No. 34)
15. Ed Negre*† (No. 8)
16. Neil Castles* (No. 06)
17. James Hylton*† (No. 48)

† signifies that the driver is known to be deceased
* Driver failed to finish race

== Timeline ==
Section reference:

- Start of race: Richard Petty started the race with the pole position.
- Lap 1: Neil Castles and James Hylton both quit the race around the same time due to concerns regarding prize money for independent teams.
- Lap 9: Ed Negre's vehicle developed severe problems with the brakes, ending his day on the track.
- Lap 14: Elmo Langley takes over the lead from Richard Petty.
- Lap 15: Wendell Scott's ignition went haywire, forcing him to exit the race prematurely.
- Lap 32: Walter Ballard's engine developed a problem, ending his day on the track.
- Lap 33: Benny Parsons's engine would stop working properly, sending him home for the rest of the day.
- Lap 57: Richard Petty takes over the lead from Elmo Langley.
- Lap 74: John Sears quit the race due to concerns regarding prize money for independent teams.
- Lap 79: Bill Shirey quit the race due to concerns regarding prize money for independent teams.
- Lap 110: Frank Warren quit the race due to concerns regarding prize money for independent teams.
- Lap 124: Earl Brooks quit the race due to concerns regarding prize money for independent teams.
- Lap 130: J.D. McDuffie's engine became problematic, causing him to withdraw from the race in a respectable seventh place.
- Lap 155: Dick May quit the race due to concerns regarding prize money for independent teams.
- Lap 201: Elmo Langley takes over the lead from Richard Petty.
- Lap 206: Richard Petty takes over the lead from Elmo Langley.
- Finish: Richard Petty was officially declared the winner of the event.

Preceded by 1971 Winston 500	NASCAR Winston Cup Series Races; 1971	Succeeded by 1971 Kingsport 300

Preceded by 1971 Virginia 500	Richard Petty's Career Wins; 1960-1984	Succeeded by 1971 Pickens 200
