= Bill Champion (racing driver) =

American NASCAR driver (1921–1991)

- Born: William Louis Champion; October 16, 1921; Norfolk, Virginia, U.S.
- Died: May 20, 1991 (aged 69)

NASCAR Cup Series career
- 289 races run over 18 years
- Best finish: 7th (1971)
- First race: 1951 Wilson 200 (Wilson)
- Last race: 1976 Gwyn Staley 400 (North Wilkesboro)
Wins	Top tens	Poles
0	43	0
- Statistics up to date as of December 25, 2012.

William Louis “Bill” Champion (October 16, 1921 – May 20, 1991) was an American stock car racing driver who competed in the NASCAR Winston Cup Series from 1951 to 1976.

Champion was the uncle of Ricky Rudd; a retired NASCAR Cup Series driver. When he was not racing on the NASCAR circuit, Champion had a shop in Newport News, Virginia. Bill's most iconic ride of his NASCAR career was driving the 1969 Ford Torino.

== Career ==
Champion managed to drive 55,262.2 miles or 88,935.9 kilometres in his professional stock car racing career; starting and finishing an average of 20th place. At the end of his career, Champion's total earnings was $234,268 ($1,325,463.68 when adjusted for inflation). Champion's experience in NASCAR added up to 57,214 laps of professional stock car racing experience. In addition to his 43 finishes in the "top-ten," Champion has also accumulated four finishes in the "top-five" and never failed to qualify for a race.

During the 1955 Southern 500, Champion managed to avoid Don Duckworth by swerving past his vehicle in a rapid manner. However, Arden Mounts did not get to see the stalled vehicle in time and prepared himself for a hard collision into Duckworth's vehicle.

One of Champion's best races was at the November running of the 1969 Georgia 500. Other spectacular finishes occurred at the 1971 Asheville 300, the 1971 Kingsport 300 and the 1971 Georgia 500. He performed the best on dirt tracks; finishing an average of 15th place. However, Champion was not a good performer on restrictor-plate tracks where he averaged a meager finish of 25th place.
