= 1972 Northern 300 =

Auto race held at Trenton Speedway in 1972

Coordinates: 40°14′21″N 74°43′16″W

Race details
- Race 19 of 31 in the 1972 NASCAR Winston Cup Series season
- Trenton Speedway, featuring its "kidney bean" shape.
- Date: July 16, 1972
- Official name: Northern 300
- Location: Trenton Speedway, Trenton, New Jersey
- Course: Permanent racing facility
- Course length: 2.410 km (1.500 miles)
- Distance: 200 laps, 300.0 mi (482.8 km)
- Weather: Hot with temperatures approaching 91 °F (33 °C); wind speeds up to 8 miles per hour (13 km/h)
- Average speed: 114.03 miles per hour (183.51 km/h)
- Attendance: 20,000

Pole position
Driver	Bobby Allison	Howard & Egerton Racing

Most laps led
Driver	Bobby Isaac	K&K Insurance Racing
- Laps: 117

Winner
No. 12	Bobby Allison	Howard & Egerton Racing

Television in the United States
- Network: untelevised
- Announcers: none

The 1972 Northern 300 was a NASCAR Winston Cup Series racing event that took place on July 16, 1972, at Trenton Speedway in Trenton, New Jersey.

== Background ==
The first race at the Fairgrounds was held on September 24, 1900, but there was no further racing there until 1907. Regular racing began in 1912 and continued until 1941. A new 1 mile dirt oval was opened in 1946. In 1957 the track was paved. It operated in that configuration until 1968 when the track was expanded to 1.5 miles (2.41 km) and a "kidney bean" shape with a 20° right-hand dogleg on the back stretch and a wider turn 3 & 4 complex than turns 1 & 2. The track closed in 1980 and the Fairgrounds itself closed 3 years later. The former site of the speedway is now occupied by the Grounds for Sculpture, a UPS shipping facility, and the housing development known as "Hamilton Lakes".

== Summary ==
Bobby Allison defeated Bobby Isaac by 1.4 seconds after two hours and fifty-seven seconds of racing. There were nine lead changes and five cautions for 21 laps. Notable crew chiefs at the race were Steve Gray, Harry Hyde, Dale Inman, Vic Ballard, Lee Gordon, and Herb Nab.

Twenty thousand people attended this live event to witness average speeds of 114.03 miles per hour (183.51 km/h). Isaac qualified for the pole position with an impressive speed of 133.126 miles per hour (214.246 km/h) on a paved oval track spanning 1.500 miles (2.414 km). A.J. Cox received the last-place finish due to overheating while Bill Shirey was disqualified for entering pit road in reverse; he was involved in the first caution of the day, having spun on John Sears' oil and went to pit lane for repairs in the opposite direction of traffic flow. The other drivers in the top ten were: Richard Petty, Fred Lorenzen, Cecil Gordon, James Hylton, Larry Smith, Benny Parsons, Raymond Williams, and Walter Ballard.

While the complete purse of this racing event was an impressive $35,675 ($268,172.69 when adjusted for inflation), the race winner actually received only $7,900 of that prize money ($59,385.12 when adjusted for inflation).

The Plymouth Superbirds and Dodge Chargers that competed in this race were equipped with special wings to demonstrate their status as muscle cars. A 1972 Chevrolet Chevelle would become the make and model to win this racing event; defeating a 1972 Dodge Charger in the process.

Bob Greenley would compete in his only NASCAR Cup Series race here along with Fred Drake.

=== Qualifying ===
Grid	No.	Driver	Manufacturer	Owner
1	71	Bobby Isaac	'72 Dodge	Nord Krauskopf
2	12	Bobby Allison	'72 Chevrolet	Richard Howard
3	43	Richard Petty	'72 Plymouth	Petty Enterprises
4	72	Benny Parsons	'71 Mercury	L.G. DeWitt
5	2	Dave Marcis	'70 Dodge	Dave Marcis
6	92	Larry Smith	'71 Ford	Harley Smith
7	90	Fred Lorenzen	'71 Ford	Junie Donlavey
8	24	Cecil Gordon	'71 Mercury	Cecil Gordon
9	10	Bill Champion	'71 Ford	Bill Champion
10	4	John Sears	'70 Plymouth	J. Marvin Mills

== Timeline ==
Section reference:

- Start of race: Bobby Isaac began the event with the pole position.
- Lap 2: A.J. Cox managed to overheat his vehicle.
- Lap 8: Earle Canavan's vehicle suddenly was leaking oil onto the track.
- Lap 15: John Sears fell out with engine failure.
- Lap 19: Dave Marcis took over the lead from Bobby Isaac.
- Lap 20: Cecil Gordon took over the lead from Dave Marcis.
- Lap 22: Bobby Isaac took over the lead from Cecil Gordon.
- Lap 33: Henley Gray fell out with engine failure.
- Lap 42: Bill Shirey was disqualified for entering pit road in reverse.
- Lap 50: Ed Hessert had a terminal crash.
- Lap 73: Bobby Allison took over the lead from Bobby Isaac.
- Lap 83: Bobby Isaac took over the lead from Bobby Allison.
- Lap 93: Fred Drake fell out with engine failure.
- Lap 104: Dave Marcis had a terminal crash.
- Lap 107: Bill Champion fell out with engine failure.
- Lap 109: Richard Petty took over the lead from Bobby Isaac.
- Lap 127: David Ray Boggs' vehicle suddenly was leaking oil onto the track.
- Lap 136: Bobby Allison took over the lead from Richard Petty.
- Lap 154: Bobby Isaac took over the lead from Bobby Allison.
- Lap 176: Bobby Allison took over the lead from Bobby Isaac.
- Finish: Bobby Allison was officially declared the winner of the event.

Preceded by 1972 Volunteer 500	NASCAR Winston Cup Series Races; 1972	Succeeded by 1972 Dixie 500
