= 1971 Space City 300 =

Auto race held at Meyer Speedway in 1971

Race details
- Race 25 of 48 in the 1971 NASCAR Winston Cup Series season
- Date: June 23, 1971
- Official name: Space City 300
- Location: Meyer Speedway, Houston, Texas
- Course: Permanent racing facility
- Course length: 0.744 km (0.500 miles)
- Distance: 300 laps, 150 mi (200 km)
- Weather: Hot with temperatures of 91 °F (33 °C); wind speeds of 8 miles per hour (13 km/h)
- Average speed: 73.489 miles per hour (118.269 km/h)
- Attendance: 9,000

Pole position
Driver	Bobby Allison	Bobby Allison Motorsports

Most laps led
Driver	Bobby Allison	Bobby Allison Motorsports
- Laps: 253

Winner
No. 12	Bobby Allison	Bobby Allison Motorsports

Television in the United States
- Network: untelevised
- Announcers: none

The 1971 Space City 300 was a NASCAR Winston Cup Series racing event that took place on June 23, 1971, at Meyer Speedway in Houston, Texas. While Houston was considered to be one of the epicenters of stock car racing during the 1950s and 1960s, the local passion for the motorsport died out starting in the 1970s.

Meyer Speedway was bumpy enough to loosen bolts off of a typical NASCAR vehicle.

With only 14 cars entering the 1971 Space City 300, this event was one of many in 1971 that contributed to significant changes demanded by new series sponsor Winston for the 1972 season, when the number of races was reduced from 48 to 31, all dirt tracks were removed from the schedule, and a minimum race distance of 250 miles (400 km) was established for races on oval tracks. While NASCAR's top series had a successful 48 race schedule in previous years, by 1971 the reduced sponsorship money being given out by the "Big Three" automobile companies made it difficult for race car drivers to justify driving their "stock" race cars under their own power (as required by the homologation rules until 1975) to events offering only small prize money.

== Race report ==
Bobby Allison defeated James Hylton by at least two laps after two hours and two minutes of racing 300 laps on a paved track); marking Allison's fifth consecutive win. The entire track was considered to span a distance of 0.500 miles (0.805 km) for a grand total of 150.0 miles (241.4 km). There were no cautions given out by NASCAR; making this a perfect race alongside the 1959 Daytona 500, the 1969 Motor Trend 500, the 1971 Asheville 300 and the 2002 EA Sports 500; which became the final oval course race that had gone the entire distance without a single caution flag.

Nine thousand people would watch a 14-car grid of American-born drivers perform speeds of up to 73.489 miles per hour (118.269 km/h). Pete Arnold would make his only start here and record the race's last-place finish due to a steering issue on lap 58. Fred Hill would make his only NASCAR Cup Series start here; ending his day with a rear end issue on lap 116. Walter Ballard finished third to claim his best career NASCAR finish. Richard Petty qualified in second place and managed to dominate 38 laps before the halfway point. Petty's vehicle developed problems with its distributor. More than 10 minutes were lost and 28 laps went by in the race before Petty was able to get his vehicle back on the track. Miraculously, he gained back 7 of his lost laps and salvaged a top-10 finish.

The NASCAR Cup Series has never again come close to having a field this small. Even for the rest of 1971, they only once had fewer than 29 cars and that was a 22 car field. Hill and Arnold make their only cup starts in this debacle of a NASCAR Cup Series event. Ronnie Chumley, who lasted a bit longer, only started six other career Cup races. The motivation to stop here on the way back across the country from Riverside was not strong as most drivers did not put their best effort forward.

This would be the last race until Kaz Grala's 2020 run at Daytona for Austin Dillon that a Cup driver debuted in a #3.

Frank Warren's Pontiac was the only General Motors product on the racing grid. The next NASCAR Winston Cup Series race to lack a major manufacturer would be the 1982 Daytona 500; which excluded all Chevrolet vehicles. Lee Gordon, Vic Ballard and Dale Inman were the three notable crew chiefs that participated in the event.

Only manual transmission vehicles were allowed to participate in this race, a policy that NASCAR has retained to the present day (as of 2022). This event would become Meyer Speedway's only NASCAR Cup Series racing event. There would be less than 15 cars in the entire racing event; a rarity during the early 1970s.

The winner would receive $2,200 in winnings ($17,081 when adjusted for inflation) while the last-place finisher would walk away with $340 ($2,640 when adjusted for inflation). Most of the teams that raced at Meyer Speedway went straight back to the Southeastern United States due to the meager prize money that was handed out at this racing event staged in the Southwestern United States.

=== Qualifying ===
Grid	No.	Driver	Manufacturer	Owner
1	12	Bobby Allison	'71 Dodge	Bobby Allison
2	43	Richard Petty	'71 Plymouth	Petty Enterprises
3	64	Elmo Langley	'69 Mercury	Elmo Langley
4	8	Ed Negre	'69 Ford	Ed Negre
5	36	Frank Warren	'70 Pontiac	H.B. Bailey
6	70	J. D. McDuffie	'69 Mercury	J. D. McDuffie
7	24	Cecil Gordon	'69 Mercury	Cecil Gordon
8	77	Charlie Roberts	'70 Ford	Charlie Roberts
9	14	Fred Hill	'69 Ford	unknown
10	19	Henley Gray	'69 Ford	Henley Gray
11	30	Walter Ballard	'71 Ford	Vic Ballard
12	00	Ronnie Chumley	'69 Ford	R.B. Chumley
13	3	Pete Arnold	'70 Ford	unknown
14	48	James Hylton	'70 Ford	James Hylton

== Finishing order ==
Pos	No.	Driver	Manufacturer	Laps	Status
1	12	Bobby Allison	Dodge	300	Running
2	48	James Hylton	Ford	298	Running
3	30	Walter Ballard	Ford	292	Running
4	64	Elmo Langley	Mercury	290	Running
5	36	Frank Warren	Pontiac	289	Running
6	24	Cecil Gordon	Mercury	286	Running
7	43	Richard Petty	Plymouth	279	Running
8	19	Henley Gray	Ford	270	Running
9	77	Charlie Roberts	Ford	254	Running
10	70	J.D. McDuffie	Mercury	249	Running
11	8	Ed Negre	Ford	239	Running
12	00	Ronnie Chumley	Ford	136	Transmission problems
13	14	Fred Hill	Ford	116	Missing rear end
14	3	Pete Arnold	Ford	58	Steering problems

== Timeline ==
Section reference:

- Lap 5: Bobby Allison takes over the lead from Richard Petty.
- Lap 9: Richard Petty takes over the lead from Bobby Allison.
- Lap 43: Bobby Allison takes over the lead from Richard Petty.
- Lap 58: Pete Arnold had trouble steering his vehicle, forcing him to withdraw from the event.
- Lap 116: Fred Hill would suffer severe damage to his vehicle's rear end, ending his day at the event.
- Lap 136: Ronnie Chumley's transmission would stop working in a normal fashion, causing him to withdraw from the event.
- Lap 148: James Hylton takes over the lead from Bobby Allison.
- Lap 157: Bobby Allison takes over the lead from James Hylton.
- Finish: Bobby Allison was officially declared the winner of the event.

Preceded by 1971 Winston Golden State 400	NASCAR Grand National Series Season; 1971	Succeeded by 1971 Pickens 200
