= Harry Hyde =

NASCAR crew chief

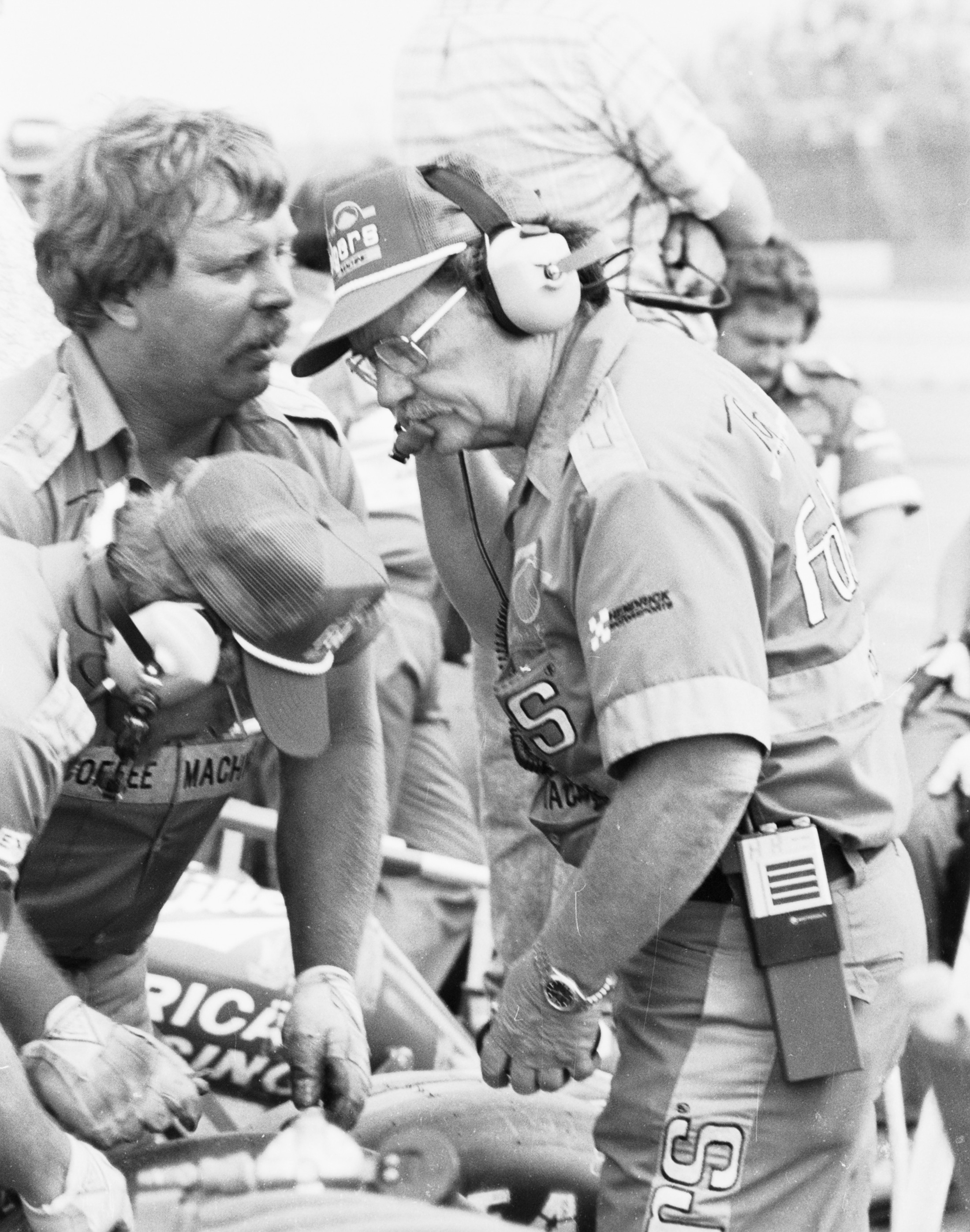
- Hyde in 1986 as crew chief for Tim Richmond

Personal information
- Born: January 17, 1925 Brownsville, Kentucky, U.S.
- Died: May 13, 1996 (aged 71)
- Occupation: Crew chief
- Years active: 1966–1993

Harry Hyde (January 17, 1925 – May 13, 1996) was an American crew chief in NASCAR stock car racing from the 1960s through the 1980s, winning 56 races and 88 pole positions. He was the 1970 championship crew chief for Bobby Isaac. He inspired the Harry Hogge character in the movie Days of Thunder.

== Early life ==
Born in Brownsville, Kentucky on January 17, 1925, Hyde learned to be a mechanic in the Army during World War II. Upon returning home, he worked as an auto mechanic and drove race cars for a couple of years, then continued racing as a car builder for local competitions in Kentucky, Indiana, and Ohio.

== Racing career ==
In 1965, Hyde was hired by Nord Krauskopf to be the crew chief of the K&K Insurance team. By 1969, the team began to see considerable success with driver Bobby Isaac, winning 17 races. In 1970, the team won the NASCAR championship and Hyde was named Mechanic of the Year.

The K&K team was one of the leaders through most of the 1970s, but in 1977, Krauskopf sold the team to J. D. Stacy. The team continued to win some races, but in 1978, the relationship between Stacy and Hyde deteriorated and Hyde left the team in mid-June. Late in 1978, Hyde would sue Stacy, and eventually would win.

In 1979, Amelio Scott hired Hyde to be the crew chief for his family team in 1979 with his son Tighe Scott as the driver. Their first race together was the 1979 Daytona 500. Scott finished sixth in the race. At the following race at Rockingham Speedway, Scott recorded his best NASCAR result when he finished fourth. They competed in 15 more events that season and ten more in 1980 before parting ways.

In 1980, Hyde opened his own racing engine shop and supplied engines to various teams. In 1984, he was hired by Rick Hendrick to be crew chief for a team he was partner in, All Star Racing. The partnership did not work out, and Hendrick bought the team out forming Hendrick Motorsports. The team won three races in 1984 with Geoff Bodine driving.

Hyde was then paired with new driver Tim Richmond, a young open-wheel racer from Ashland, Ohio, as Hendrick went to a two-car operation. The brashness of the new driver from outside the southern stock car circuit did not initially sit well with the notably irascible Hyde. However, after a few races they developed a relationship and began to win races. This season was the source of much of the story line for the motion picture Days of Thunder. Hyde's character was portrayed by Robert Duvall.

The team was very successful in 1986. Richmond won seven races and finished third in points behind legends Dale Earnhardt and Darrell Waltrip.

Richmond, who was noted for womanizing, was diagnosed with AIDS during 1987 and missed most of the season with illness which he explained to the public as pneumonia. Richmond returned to the track in the Miller High Life 500 at Pocono. Driving like a man on a mission, he overcame a shifter problem to put the Folgers No. 25 Chevrolet back into victory lane. The very next week he outclassed the field in the Budweiser 400 at Riverside, bringing home his final Winston Cup victory. Jimmy Means drove Richmond's Folgers Chevrolet in the Oakwood Homes 500 at Charlotte, but the No. 25 was reversed to No. 52, which was Jimmy's normal car number. He crashed on lap 20, finishing 40th. Car owner Rick Hendrick drove the Folgers No. 25 in the Winston Western 500 at Riverside, not faring much better. He left the race on lap 75 with transmission trouble, finishing 33rd.

Ken Schrader became the driver for the No. 25 team in 1988, but Hendrick had become a three car operation, and Hyde sometimes felt ignored. He left after the season to become crew chief for Stavola Brothers Racing where he worked through the first half of the 1991 season, before moving to Chad Little's No. 19 Bullseye BBQ/Tyson Foods Ford.

Hyde had 48 career victories. His forte was setting up cars for specific tracks. His race shop is still part of the Hendrick Motorsports facility, and a road within the complex is known as Hyde's Way.

Hyde died in 1996 of a heart attack brought on by a blood clot, and was inducted into the International Motorsports Hall of Fame in 2004.

== Teams, numbers, drivers ==
- K&K Insurance, No. 71, Gordon Johncock (1965), Earl Balmer (1965–1966), Bobby Isaac (1967–1972), Buddy Baker (1972–1974), Dave Marcis (1974–1976)
- Jim Stacy, No. 5: Neil Bonnett, No. 6: Ferrel Harris (1977–1978)
- Russ Togs No. 30, Tighe Scott (1979–1980)
- All Star Racing, No. 5, Geoff Bodine (1984)
- Hendrick Motorsports, No. 5 Geoff Bodine (1985), No. 25, Tim Richmond (1986–1987), Benny Parsons (1987), Rick Hendrick (1987), Ken Schrader (1988)
- Stavola Brothers, No. 8, Bobby Hillin Jr. (1989–1990), Rick Wilson (1991)
- Chad Little, No. 19 Chad Little (1991)
- Greg Sacks, Hut Stricklin, Dave Marcis, No. 41 Larry Hedrick Motorsports (1992)
