= 1967 NASCAR Grand National Series =

1964 NASCAR Grand National Series

Seasons
- ← 1966 1968 →

The 1967 NASCAR Grand National Series was the 19th season of professional stock car racing in the United States. The season, which began on November 13, 1966 at Augusta International Raceway near Augusta, Georgia, was contested over 49 races. The season ended at Asheville Weaverville Speedway in Weaverville, North Carolina, on November 5, 1967. Richard Petty was the drivers' champion. Future NASCAR Hall of Famer Donnie Allison was the Rookie of the Year.

== Results ==
No	Date	Race	Track	Track type		Pole Position	Winning Driver	Report
No	Date	Race	Track	Surface	Length (miles)	Pole Position	Winning Driver	Report
1	11/13/1966	Augusta 300	Augusta International Raceway (Hephzibah, GA)	Paved	0.500	Dick Hutcherson	Richard Petty	
2	01/29/1967	Motor Trend 500	Riverside International Raceway (Riverside, CA)	Road	2.700	Dick Hutcherson	Parnelli Jones	
3	02/24/1967	Twin 125 #1	Daytona International Speedway (Daytona Beach, FL)	Paved	2.500	Curtis Turner	LeeRoy Yarbrough	
4	02/24/1967	Twin 125 #2	Daytona International Speedway (Daytona Beach, FL)	Paved	2.500	Richard Petty	Fred Lorenzen	
5	02/26/1967	Daytona 500	Daytona International Speedway (Daytona Beach, FL)	Paved	2.500	Curtis Turner	Mario Andretti	Report
6	03/05/1967	Fireball 300	Asheville Weaverville Speedway (Weaverville, NC)	Paved	0.500	Darel Dieringer	Richard Petty	Report
7	03/19/1967	Southeastern 500	Bristol International Speedway (Bristol, TN)	Paved	0.500	Darel Dieringer	David Pearson	
8	03/25/1967	Greenville 200	Greenville-Pickens Speedway (Easley, SC)	Dirt	0.500	Dick Hutcherson	David Pearson	Report
9	03/27/1967		Bowman Gray Stadium (Winston-Salem, NC)	Paved	0.250	Bobby Allison	Bobby Allison	
10	04/02/1967	Atlanta 500	Atlanta Motor Speedway (Hampton, GA)	Paved	1.500	Cale Yarborough	Cale Yarborough	Report
11	04/06/1967	Sandlapper 200	Columbia Speedway (Cayce, SC)	Dirt	0.500	Dick Hutcherson	Richard Petty	
12	04/09/1967	Hickory 250	Hickory Speedway (Hickory, NC)	Dirt	0.400	Richard Petty	Richard Petty	
13	04/16/1967	Gwyn Staley 400	North Wilkesboro Speedway (North Wilkesboro, NC)	Paved	0.625	Darel Dieringer	Darel Dieringer	Report
14	04/23/1967	Virginia 500	Martinsville Speedway (Manassas, VA)	Paved	0.500	Darel Dieringer	Richard Petty	
15	04/28/1967		Savannah Speedway (Savannah, GA)	Dirt	0.500	John Sears	Bobby Allison	
16	04/30/1967	Richmond 250	Richmond Raceway (Richmond, VA)	Dirt	0.500	Richard Petty	Richard Petty	
17	05/13/1967	Rebel 400	Darlington Raceway (Darlington, SC)	Paved	1.375	David Pearson	Richard Petty	
18	05/19/1967	Beltsville 200	Beltsville Speedway (Beltsville, MD)	Paved	0.500	Richard Petty	Jim Paschal	
19	05/20/1967	Tidewater 250	Langley Field Speedway (Hampton, VA)	Dirt	0.400	Richard Petty	Richard Petty	
20	05/28/1967	Charlotte World 600	Charlotte Motor Speedway (Concord, NC)	Paved	1.500	Cale Yarborough	Jim Paschal	Report
21	06/02/1967		New Asheville Speedway (Asheville, NC)	Paved	0.333	Richard Petty	Jim Paschal	
22	06/06/1967	Macon 300	Middle Georgia Raceway (Byron, GA)	Paved	0.500	Richard Petty	Richard Petty	
23	06/08/1967	East Tennessee 200	Smoky Mountain Raceway (Maryville, TN)	Dirt	0.500	Jim Hunter	Richard Petty	
24	06/10/1967		Fairgrounds Raceway (Birmingham, AL)	Paved	0.625	Jim Paschal	Bobby Allison	
25	06/18/1967	Carolina 500	North Carolina Motor Speedway (Rockingham, NC)	Paved	1.000	Dick Hutcherson	Richard Petty	Report
26	06/24/1967		Greenville-Pickens Speedway (Easley, SC)	Dirt	0.500	Richard Petty	Richard Petty	
27	06/27/1967		Montgomery Motor Speedway (Montgomery, AL)	Paved	0.500	Richard Petty	Jim Paschal	
28	07/04/1967	Firecracker 400	Daytona International Speedway (Daytona Beach, FL)	Paved	2.500	Darel Dieringer	Cale Yarborough	
29	07/09/1967	Northern 300	Trenton Speedway (Trenton, NJ)	Paved	1.000	Richard Petty	Richard Petty	
30	07/11/1967	Maine 300	Oxford Plains Speedway (Oxford, ME)	Paved	0.333	James Hylton	Bobby Allison	
31	07/13/1967		Fonda Speedway (Fonda, NY)	Dirt	0.500	Richard Petty	Richard Petty	
32	07/15/1967	Islip 300	Islip Speedway (Islip, NY)	Paved	0.200	Richard Petty	Richard Petty	
33	07/23/1967	Volunteer 500	Bristol International Speedway (Bristol, TN)	Paved	0.500	Richard Petty	Richard Petty	
34	07/27/1967	Smoky Mountain 200	Smoky Mountain Raceway (Maryville, TN)	Dirt	0.500	Dick Hutcherson	Dick Hutcherson	
35	07/29/1967	Nashville 400	Nashville Superspeedway (Nashville, TN)	Paved	0.500	Dick Hutcherson	Richard Petty	
36	08/06/1967	Dixie 500	Atlanta Motor Speedway (Hampton, GA)	Paved	1.500	Darel Dieringer	Dick Hutcherson	
37	08/12/1967	Myers Brothers Memorial	Bowman Gray Stadium (Winston-Salem, NC)	Paved	0.250	Richard Petty	Richard Petty	
38	08/17/1967		Columbia Speedway (Cayce, SC)	Dirt	0.500	Richard Petty	Richard Petty	
39	08/25/1967		Savannah Speedway (Savannah, GA)	Dirt	0.500	Richard Petty	Richard Petty	
40	09/04/1967	Southern 500	Darlington Raceway (Darlington, SC)	Paved	1.375	Richard Petty	Richard Petty	
41	09/08/1967	Buddy Shuman Memorial	Hickory Speedway (Hickory, NC)	Paved	0.400	Dick Hutcherson	Richard Petty	
42	09/10/1967	Capital City 300	Richmond Raceway (Richmond, VA)	Dirt	0.500	Earl Brooks	Richard Petty	Report
43	09/15/1967	Maryland 300	Beltsville Speedway (Beltsville, MD)	Paved	0.500	Richard Petty	Richard Petty	
44	09/17/1967	Hillsborough 150	Orange Speedway (Hillsborough, NC)	Dirt	0.900	Richard Petty	Richard Petty	
45	09/24/1967	Old Dominion 500	Martinsville Speedway (Manassas, VA)	Paved	0.500	Cale Yarborough	Richard Petty	
46	10/01/1967	Wilkes 400	North Wilkesboro Speedway (North Wilkesboro, NC)	Paved	0.625	Dick Hutcherson	Richard Petty	Report
47	10/15/1967	National 500	Charlotte Motor Speedway (Concord, NC)	Paved	1.500	Cale Yarborough	Buddy Baker	Report
48	10/29/1967	American 500	North Carolina Motor Speedway (Rockingham, NC)	Paved	1.000	David Pearson	Bobby Allison	
49	11/05/1967	Western North Carolina 500	Asheville Weaverville Speedway (Weaverville, NC)	Paved	0.500	Bobby Allison	Bobby Allison	

== Driver standings ==
The top 50 drivers in the end of season standings:

No	Driver	Points	Starts	Poles	Wins	Top 5s	Top 10s	Laps	Laps Led	$ Earnings
1	Richard Petty	42,472	48	18	27	38	40	12,739	5,543	150,196
2	James Hylton	36,444	46	1	0	26	39	11,526	109	49,732
3	Dick Hutcherson	33,658	33	9	2	22	25	8,893	1,455	85,159
4	Bobby Allison	30,812	45	2	6	21	27	10,157	1,554	58,250
5	John Sears	29,078	41	1	0	9	25	10,031	62	28,937
6	Jim Paschal	27,624	45	1	4	20	25	9,402	1,074	60,122
7	David Pearson	26,302	22	2	2	11	13	5,638	667	72,650
8	Neil Castles	23,218	35	0	0	4	15	6,764	0	20,682
9	Elmo Langley	22,286	45	0	0	10	24	9,652	0	23,898
10	Wendell Scott	20,700	45	0	0	0	11	9,217	0	19,510
11	Paul Goldsmith	20,402	21	0	0	7	8	4,851	398	38,731
12	Darel Dieringer	20,194	19	6	1	8	9	4,537	765	34,709
13	Clyde Lynn	20,016	44	0	0	5	22	9,556	0	19,519
14	Bobby Isaac	19,698	12	0	0	3	5	2,625	65	24,474
15	Buddy Baker	18,600	21	0	1	6	7	4,146	480	46,949
16	Donnie Allison	18,298	20	0	0	4	7	4,336	158	17,613
17	Henley Gray	17,502	43	0	0	0	10	7,864	0	15,986
18	J. T. Putney	16,752	29	0	0	1	10	6,110	0	15,686
19	Tiny Lund	16,292	19	0	0	4	5	3,597	36	17,331
20	Cale Yarborough	16,228	18	4	2	7	9	4,114	908	57,911
21	G. C. Spencer	15,240	29	0	0	5	10	4,947	0	20,225
22	Bill Seifert	14,676	40	0	0	0	12	8,093	0	11,910
23	Charlie Glotzbach	11,444	9	0	0	3	5	1,783	4	14,870
24	Frank Warren	9,992	12	0	0	0	1	1,805	0	9,185
25	Earl Brooks	9,952	34	0	0	0	8	5,373	24	8,610
26	Buddy Arrington	9,768	15	0	0	1	5	3,072	0	7,820
27	Buck Baker	9,450	20	0	0	0	5	4,303	0	7,730
28	Wayne Smith	9,372	28	0	0	0	2	4,464	0	10,225
29	Fred Lorenzen	9,268	5	0	1	2	2	895	23	19,125
30	Roy Mayne	9,262	14	0	0	0	1	2,209	3	8,930
31	Bobby Wawak	9,078	14	0	0	0	3	2,225	0	8,070
32	Friday Hassler	8,820	21	0	0	3	9	4,309	12	10,270
33	Paul Lewis	8,492	14	0	0	3	8	2,959	4	8,720
34	Sonny Hutchins	8,448	7	0	0	0	2	998	0	6,385
35	Bud Moore	7,812	6	0	0	2	3	1,351	0	7,200
36	Sam McQuagg	7,400	15	0	0	3	3	2,244	11	10,045
37	LeeRoy Yarbrough	7,012	15	0	1	3	4	2,647	34	15,575
38	Don Biederman	5,850	22	0	0	0	1	2,679	0	5,935
39	Ramo Stott	5,676	3	0	0	0	1	588	0	3,335
40	George Davis	5,434	21	0	0	1	6	3,342	0	4,400
41	Jack Harden	5,254	10	0	0	0	0	1,393	0	4,450
42	Paul Dean Holt	5,006	24	0	0	0	1	3,165	0	4,330
43	Roy Tyner	4,936	27	0	0	0	1	2,966	0	8,290
44	Bill Champion	4,040	11	0	0	0	0	1,889	0	6,205
45	Dick Johnson	3,954	23	0	0	0	0	2,636	0	5,070
46	George Poulos	3,780	23	0	0	0	1	2,902	0	3,040
47	Bill Dennis	3,730	3	0	0	0	0	1,012	0	2,335
48	Doug Cooper	3,666	21	0	0	2	5	3,351	0	5,665
49	Ed Negre	3,578	14	0	0	0	0	1,439	0	3,805
50	H. B. Bailey	3,482	3	0	0	0	0	322	0	3,850
