= 1967 World 600 =

American NASCAR auto race in 1967

Race details
- Race 20 of 49 in the 1967 NASCAR Grand National Series season
- Date: May 28, 1967
- Location: Charlotte Motor Speedway, Concord, North Carolina
- Course: Permanent racing facility
- Course length: 1.5 miles (2.4 km)
- Distance: 400+ laps, 600 mi (965.606 km)
- Average speed: 135.832 mph (218.600 km/h)

Pole position
Driver	Cale Yarborough	
- Time: 139.910 seconds

Most laps led
Driver	Jim Paschal	N/A
- Laps: 335

Winner
No. 14	Jim Paschal	

The 1967 World 600, the 8th running of the event, was a NASCAR Grand National Series race held on May 28, 1967 at Charlotte Motor Speedway in Charlotte, North Carolina. Contested over 400 laps on the 1.5 mile (2.4 km) speedway, it was the 20th race of the 1967 NASCAR Grand National Series season.

== Background ==
Charlotte Motor Speedway is a motorsports complex located in Concord, North Carolina, United States, 13 miles from Charlotte, North Carolina. The complex features a 1.5 miles (2.4 km) quad oval track that hosts NASCAR racing including the prestigious World 600 on Memorial Day weekend and the National 500. The speedway was built in 1959 by Bruton Smith and is considered the home track for NASCAR with many race teams located in the Charlotte area. The track is owned and operated by Speedway Motorsports Inc. (SMI).

== Race report ==
Jim Paschal led 334 laps during the race; he would go on to win this event by holding off two hard-chargers, David Pearson and Bobby Allison. Paschal had built a three-lap lead when he lost control of his Plymouth and hit the wall on Lap 339 of 400. His crew patched up his car, but he was back on the same lap as his challengers. Tom Ingram would retire from NASCAR after the race was over.

Paschal was in the middle of winning three races out of four; the $28,450 payoff dwarfed the other races for him that year. He was also considered to be one of the most underrated drivers in NASCAR history, despite winning only 25 races. Martin Truex Jr would eventually beat Jim Paschal's record at Charlotte Motor Speedway in 2017 by virtue of leading 392 laps in a race.

Drivers who failed to qualify for the race were Curtis Turner (#74), Don Hume (#09), Jimmy Helms (#91), Ken Spikes (#62) and Paul Marino (#07). The day before the race, Hume crashed into the guardrail during a 30-lap last chance qualifying race, causing his car to flip wildly. The footage was used in the movie Speedway, starring Elvis Presley.

=== Top 10 finishers ===
Pos	No.	Driver	Manufacturer	Laps	Laps led	Time/Status
1	14	Jim Paschal	'67 Plymouth	400	335	4:25:02
2	17	David Pearson	'67 Ford	400	0	+5 seconds
3	6	Bobby Allison	'67 Dodge	400	0	Lead lap under green flag
4	43	Richard Petty	'67 Plymouth	397	0	+3 laps
5	42	Tiny Lund	'67 Plymouth	396	0	+4 laps
6	29	Dick Hutcherson	'67 Ford	395	0	+5 laps
7	3	Buddy Baker	'67 Dodge	394	4	+6 laps
8	01	Ramo Stott	'67 Plymouth	388	0	+12 laps
9	28	James Hylton	'65 Dodge	385	0	+15 laps
10	11	J.T. Putney	'67 Chevrolet	383	0	+17 laps
