= Donnie Allison =

American racecar driver (born 1939)

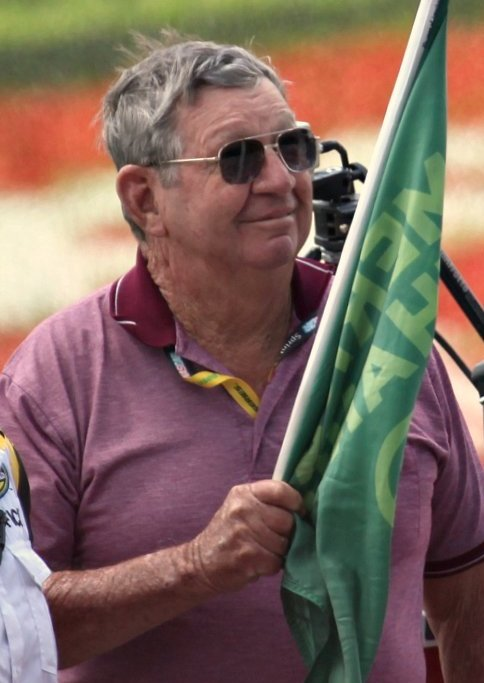
- Allison at Rockingham Speedway in 2012
- Born: September 7, 1939 (age 87); Miami, Florida, U.S.
- Achievements: 1970 World 600 Winner 1971 Winston 500 Winner; 1970 Firecracker 400 Winner 1975 Snowball Derby winner
- Awards: 1967 Grand National Series Rookie of the Year 1970 Indianapolis 500 Rookie of the Year; International Motorsports Hall of Fame (2009) NASCAR Hall of Fame (2024)

NASCAR Cup Series career
- 242 races run over 20 years
- Best finish: 16th (1967)
- First race: 1966 National 500 (Charlotte)
- Last race: 1988 Champion Spark Plug 400 (Michigan)
- First win: 1968 Carolina 500 (Rockingham)
- Last win: 1978 Dixie 500 (Atlanta)
Wins	Top tens	Poles
10	115	18

NASCAR O'Reilly Auto Parts Series career
- 20 races run over 5 years
- Best finish: 34th (1987)
- First race: 1984 Miller Time 300 (Charlotte)
- Last race: 1989 Goody's 300 (Daytona)
Wins	Top tens	Poles
0	5	0

NASCAR Grand National East Series career
- 2 races run over 1 year
- First race: 1972 Mr. D's 200 (Nashville)
- Last race: 1972 Mountaineer 300 (West Virginia)
Wins	Top tens	Poles
0	0	0
- Statistics up to date as of February 28, 2013.

Donnie Allison (born September 7, 1939) is an American former driver on the NASCAR Grand National/Winston Cup circuit, who won ten times during his racing career, which spanned from 1966 to 1988. He is part of the "Alabama Gang", and is the brother of 1983 champion Bobby Allison and uncle of Davey Allison and Clifford Allison. He was inducted in the International Motorsports Hall of Fame in 2009. He was inducted into the NASCAR Hall of Fame on January 19, 2024.

== NASCAR career ==
Before racing in the Grand National Series, Allison, like his brother Bobby, drove modified stock cars. Allison managed to get ten wins in NASCAR Cup Series competition with his first coming at the 1968 Carolina 500 at Rockingham Speedway and his final coming at the 1978 Dixie 500 at Atlanta Motor Speedway. Allison would suffer serious injuries at the 1981 Coca-Cola 600, this would end his career in NASCAR for the most part. Allison would only race fourteen more Winston Cup races (he would also fail to qualify four times for races during this time) from 1982 to 1988. Allison also won the 1967 NASCAR Grand National Rookie of the Year.

=== 1979 Daytona 500 ===
Allison is perhaps best remembered for his involvement in a final-lap crash and a subsequent fight with Cale Yarborough in the 1979 Daytona 500. He was leading the race on the final lap with Yarborough drafting him tightly. As Yarborough started to go below Allison, he attempted to take the inside lane away but Yarborough hit Allison from behind first and got Allison sideways. Yarborough made contact with the side of Allison's car and it put him in the grass. He came back to hit Allison side to side and as both drivers tried to regain control, their cars made contact several times and finally locked together and crashed into the outside wall in turn 3. After the cars settled in the infield grass, Allison and Yarborough were in a heated conversation when, Bobby Allison, who finished laps down after his earlier collision with his brother, pulled over and to check on his brother, but Yarborough accused him of causing the accident and started to hit Bobby while Bobby was still in his car. At that point, a fight ensued. As the 1979 Daytona 500 was the first live flag-to-flag nationally televised NASCAR race, the finish and the post-race squabble were a ratings dream for CBS. Richard Petty, who was over half a lap behind at the time of the crash, went on to win the race. The fight made headlines all across America. The publicity was instrumental in the growth of NASCAR.

== USAC career ==
Allison first raced in the USAC Championship Car Series in 1970. Driving the No. 83 Eagle 67-Offenhauser for Ansted-Thompson Racing in the 1970 Indianapolis 500, he finished 4th and won the 1970 Indianapolis 500 Rookie of the Year Award. He would have finished twentieth in points, but because he was using a NASCAR license, he was ineligible for points. For the 1971 Allison drove the No. 84 Purolator Filters Coyote-Ford V8, finishing 6th in the Indianapolis 500. He also raced in the Rex Mays 150 at Milwaukee State Fairgrounds Speedway, the Schaefer 500 at Pocono International Raceway, and the California 500 at Ontario Motor Speedway, retiring from both. Allison was again ineligible for points.

== After racing ==
Allison, who lives in Alabama and North Carolina, has been a television and radio commentator; has also been involved in his sons' Ronald, Donald and Kenny Allison's "Allison Brothers Race Cars" and the "Allison Legacy Race Series" as a consultant to the series and to many up and coming race drivers such as Joey Logano, Trevor Bayne, Regan Smith, John Hunter Nemechek and several others

== Awards ==
- 1967 NASCAR Grand National Rookie of the Year
- 1968 NASCAR Most Popular Driver Grand Touring Division (Baby Grand)
- 1970 Stark and Wetzel Indianapolis 500 Rookie of the Year
- 1970 NASCAR Most Popular Driver Late Model Sportsman Division
- Inducted into the Alabama Sports Hall of Fame in 1999
- Inducted into the Florida Sports Hall of Fame in 2000
- Inducted into the Stock Car Racing Hall of Fame in 2001
- Inducted into the Alabama Auto Racing Pioneers in 2005
- Inducted into the International Motorsports Hall of Fame in 2009
- Inducted into the Motorsports Hall of Fame of America in 2011
- Inducted into the Augusta Raceway Preservation Society in 2017
- Inducted into the National Motorsports Press Association Hall of Fame in 2018
- Inducted into the Talladega-Texaco Walk of Fame
- Inducted into the NASCAR Hall of Fame in 2024

== Motorsports career results ==
=== NASCAR ===
(key) (Bold – Pole position awarded by qualifying time. Italics – Pole position earned by points standings or practice time. * – Most laps led.)

==== Grand National Series ====
NASCAR Grand National Series results
Year	Team	No.	Make	1	2	3	4	5	6	7	8	9	10	11	12	13	14	15	16	17	18	19	20	21	22	23	24	25	26	27	28	29	30	31	32	33	34	35	36	37	38	39	40	41	42	43	44	45	46	47	48	49	50	51	52	53	54	NGNC	Pts	Ref
1966	Robert Harper	05	Chevy	AUG	RSD	DAY	DAY	DAY	CAR	BRI	ATL	HCY	CLB	GPS	BGS	NWS	MAR	DAR	LGY	MGR	MON	RCH	CLT	DTS	ASH	PIF	SMR	AWS	BLV	GPS	DAY	ODS	BRR	OXF	FON	ISP	BRI	SMR	NSV	ATL; DNQ	CLB	AWS	BLV	BGS	DAR	HCY	RCH	HBO	MAR	NWS	CLT; 27	CAR; 9						64th	1944	
1967	Robert Harper	05	Chevy	AUG	RSD	DAY; 20	DAY	DAY; 11	AWS	BRI; 7	GPS	BGS	ATL; 12	CLB	HCY	NWS	MAR; 19	SVH	RCH																																							16th	18298	
1967	Donald Brackins	2	Chevy																	DAR; 27	BLV; 4	LGY; 5		ASH; 2*	MGR	SMR; 15	BIR; 15	CAR	GPS	MGY; 19																												16th	18298	
1967	Jon Thorne	12	Dodge																				CLT; 26																																			16th	18298	
1967	Jon Thorne	12	Ford																												DAY; 10	TRN	OXF	FDA	ISP				ATL; 4	BGS	CLB	SVH	DAR; 7	HCY	RCH	BLV	HBO	MAR; 24	NWS	CLT; 15	CAR; 25	AWS						16th	18298	
1967	Jon Thorne	12	Chevy																																	BRI; 25	SMR	NSV																				16th	18298	
1968	Holman-Moody	66	Ford	MGR	MGY	RSD	DAY; 40																																																			25th	1307	
1968	Matthews Racing	27	Ford					BRI; 30	RCH	ATL; 3	HCY	GPS	CLB	NWS	MAR; 3	AUG	AWS	DAR; 29	BLV	LGY	**CLT**; 2	ASH	MGR	SMR	BIR	CAR; 1	GPS	DAY	ISP	OXF	FDA	TRN	BRI; 34	SMR	NSV	ATL; 3	CLB	BGS	AWS	SBO	LGY	DAR; 10	HCY	RCH	BLV	HBO	MAR; 8	NWS	AUG	CLT; 6	CAR; 16	JFC						25th	1307	
1969	Matthews Racing	27	Ford	MGR	MGY	RSD	DAY; 3	DAY	DAY; 3*	CAR; 6	AUG	BRI; 5	ATL	CLB	HCY	GPS	RCH	NWS	MAR	AWS	DAR; 34	BLV	LGY	**CLT**; 2	MGR	SMR	**MCH**; 27	KPT	GPS	NCF	DAY; 3	DOV	TPN	TRN	BLV	BRI; 3	NSV	SMR	ATL; 5	MCH; 33	SBO	BGS	AWS	DAR; 4	HCY	RCH	TAL	CLB	MAR; 31	NWS	CLT; 1*	SVH	AUG	CAR; 30	JFC	MGR	TWS; 2	24th	1662	
1970	Matthews Racing	27	Ford	RSD; 4	DAY; 4	DAY	DAY; 35	RCH	CAR	SVH	ATL; 7	BRI; 1*	TAL	NWS; 22	CLB	DAR	BLV	LGY	CLT; 1*	SMR	MAR	MCH	RSD	HCY; 17	KPT	GPS	DAY; 1	AST	TPN	TRN	BRI; 25	SMR	NSV	ATL; 5	CLB	ONA	MCH; 28	TAL	BGS	SBO	DAR; 11*	HCY; 6	RCH; 3	DOV	NCF		CLT; 18	MAR; 5	MGR	CAR; 4	LGY							40th	841	
1970	Junior Johnson & Associates	98	Ford																																											NWS; 3												40th	841	
1971	Matthews Racing	27	Mercury	RSD	DAY; 6	DAY	DAY; 26	ONT	RCH	CAR	HCY	BRI	ATL	CLB	GPS	SMR	NWS																																									29th	1280	
1971	Wood Brothers Racing	21	Mercury															**MAR**; 15*	**DAR**; 4*	SBO	**TAL**; 1	ASH	KPT	CLT; 2	DOV	MCH; 4*	RSD	HOU	GPS	**DAY**; 5	BRI	AST	ISP	TRN	NSV	ATL; 6	BGS	ONA	MCH	**TAL**; 41	CLB	HCY	DAR	MAR; 5	CLT; 3	DOV	CAR; 39	MGR	RCH	NWS	TWS							29th	1280	

==== Winston Cup Series ====
NASCAR Winston Cup Series results
Year	Team	No.	Make	1	2	3	4	5	6	7	8	9	10	11	12	13	14	15	16	17	18	19	20	21	22	23	24	25	26	27	28	29	30	31	NWCC	Pts	Ref
1972	Monty Myers	27	Chevy	RSD	DAY	RCH	ONT	CAR	ATL; 5	BRI	DAR	NWS	MAR	TAL; 28																					36th	1849.15	
1972	Bud Moore Engineering	15	Ford												CLT; 34	DOV	MCH; 33			DAY; 8	BRI	TRN	ATL; 32				DAR; 38	RCH	DOV	MAR	NWS	CLT; 25	CAR	TWS	36th	1849.15	
1972	Penske Racing	16	AMC															RSD; 3	TWS																36th	1849.15	
1972	Crawford Racing	22	Plymouth																					TAL; 31	MCH	NSV									36th	1849.15	
1973	DiGard Motorsports	59	Chevy	RSD	DAY; DNQ	RCH; 25	CAR	BRI; 24	ATL	NWS; 9	DAR																								35th	1755.75	
1973	DiGard Motorsports	88	Chevy									MAR; 27				DOV; 38	TWS	RSD	MCH; 7	DAY; 28	BRI	ATL; 3	TAL; 26	NSV	DAR	RCH	DOV; 12	NWS	MAR; 34	CLT; 32	CAR; 6				35th	1755.75	
1973	DiGard Motorsports	08	Chevy										TAL; 2	NSV	CLT																				35th	1755.75	
1974	DiGard Motorsports	88	Chevy	RSD; 6	DAY; 6	RCH; 17	CAR; 27	**BRI**; 5	ATL; 5	**DAR**; 4	NWS; 7	MAR; 23	TAL; 36	NSV; 2	DOV; 30	CLT; 30	RSD	MCH; 20	DAY; 33	BRI	NSV	ATL; 30	POC	TAL; 40	MCH	DAR	RCH	DOV; 31	NWS	MAR; 3	CLT; 4	CAR; 6	ONT		17th	728.8	
1975	DiGard Motorsports	88	Chevy	RSD	**DAY**; 28	RCH	CAR; 28	BRI	ATL; 6	NWS	DAR; 3	MAR; 21	TAL; 42	NSV	DOV; 28	CLT; 9	RSD	MCH; 35	**DAY**; 5	NSV	POC														28th	1376	
1975	Ellington Racing	28	Chevy																			TAL; 3	MCH	DAR	DOV	NWS	MAR					ATL; 27	ONT		28th	1376	
1975	Howard & Egerton Racing	27	Chevy																									CLT; 33	RCH	CAR; 9	BRI				28th	1376	
1976	Ellington Racing	28	Chevy	RSD	DAY	CAR	RCH	BRI	ATL	NWS	DAR; 34	MAR	TAL; 7	NSV	DOV; 35	CLT; 6	RSD	MCH	DAY	NSV	POC	TAL	MCH	BRI	DAR; 33	RCH	DOV	MAR	NWS				ONT; 34		34th	988	
1976	Ellington Racing	1	Chevy																											CLT; 1	CAR; 7	ATL; 3			34th	988	
1977	Ellington Racing	1	Chevy	RSD	**DAY**; 30	RCH	**CAR**; 3	ATL; 4	NWS	DAR; 2	BRI	MAR; 26	TAL; 4*	NSV	DOV	CLT; 33	RSD	MCH; 24	DAY; 6	NSV	POC	TAL; 1*	MCH	BRI	DAR; 2	RCH	DOV; 4	MAR; 28	NWS	CLT; 36	**CAR**; 1*	ATL; 4*	ONT; 42		24th	1970	
1978	Ellington Racing	1	Olds	RSD	DAY; 39	RCH															POC; 35	TAL; 2	MCH; 29	BRI			DOV; 9	MAR	NWS						25th	1993	
1978	Ellington Racing	1	Chevy				CAR; 31	ATL; 3	BRI	DAR; 23	NWS	MAR	TAL; 24	DOV	CLT; 2	NSV	RSD	MCH; 5	DAY; 33	NSV					DAR; 24	RCH				CLT; 4	CAR; 20	ATL; 1	ONT; 3		25th	1993	
1979	Ellington Racing	1	Chevy	RSD; 5		CAR; 30	RCH; 9	ATL; 7	NWS; 11	BRI; 6	**DAR**; 3	MAR; 27				CLT; 37	TWS	RSD	MCH; 2	DAY; 12	NSV	POC	TAL; 30	MCH	BRI	DAR; 31	RCH	DOV; 2	MAR	CLT; 5	NWS	CAR; 4	ATL; 35	ONT; 11	24th	2508	
1979	Ellington Racing	1	Olds		DAY; 4*								TAL; 23	NSV	DOV																				24th	2508	
1980	Ellington Racing	1	Olds	RSD	DAY; 7	RCH																													26th	1730	
1980	Ellington Racing	1	Chevy				CAR; 5	ATL; 26	BRI	DAR	NWS	MAR																							26th	1730	
1980	Halpern Enterprises	02	Olds										TAL; 25	NSV	DOV																				26th	1730	
1980	Ogden Racing	18	Chevy													CLT; 31	TWS																		26th	1730	
1980	Kennie Childers Racing	12	Chevy															RSD; 30	MCH; 36		NSV; 27	POC		MCH; 3	BRI	DAR; 32	RCH	DOV; 7	NWS	MAR; 6	CLT; 5	**CAR**; 22	ATL; 37	ONT; 39	26th	1730	
1980	Kennie Childers Racing	12	Olds																	DAY; 19			TAL; 26												26th	1730	
1981	Kennie Childers Racing	12	Olds	RSD	DAY; 12	RCH	CAR; 34	ATL; 29	BRI	NWS	DAR	MAR																							44th	527	
1981	John Rebhan	77	Olds										TAL; 5	NSV	DOV; 11	CLT; 38	TWS	RSD	MCH	DAY	NSV	POC	TAL	MCH	BRI	DAR	RCH	DOV	MAR	NWS	CLT	CAR	ATL	RSD	44th	527	
1982	Ogden Racing	18	Buick	DAY; 34	RCH	BRI	ATL; 11	CAR; 22																											45th	406	
1982	Rogers Racing	37	Buick						DAR; 9	NWS	MAR; 30	TAL; 6	NSV	DOV; 8	CLT; 37	POC	RSD	MCH	DAY	NSV	POC	TAL	MCH	BRI	DAR	RCH	DOV	NWS	CLT	MAR	CAR				45th	406	
1982	Ellington Racing	1	Olds																													ATL; 38	RSD		45th	406	
1983	Cliff Stewart Racing	88	Pontiac	DAY	RCH	CAR	ATL	DAR	NWS	MAR	TAL	NSV	DOV	BRI	CLT	RSD	POC	MCH	DAY	NSV	POC	TAL	MCH	BRI	DAR	RCH	DOV	MAR	NWS	CLT	CAR	ATL; 36	RSD; 14		NA	0	
1986	Gray Racing	54	Chevy	DAY	RCH	CAR	ATL	BRI	DAR	NWS	MAR	TAL	DOV	CLT	RSD	POC	MCH	DAY	POC	TAL	GLN	MCH	BRI	DAR; 33	RCH	DOV	MAR	NWS	CLT	CAR	ATL	RSD			114th	64	
1987	Gray Racing	54	Chevy	DAY; DNQ	CAR	RCH	ATL	DAR	NWS	BRI	MAR	TAL	CLT	DOV	POC	RSD	MCH	DAY	POC	TAL	GLN	MCH	BRI	DAR	RCH	DOV	MAR	NWS	CLT	CAR	RSD	ATL			NA	-	
1988	AAG Racing	34	Buick	DAY; DNQ	RCH	CAR	ATL	DAR	BRI	NWS	MAR	TAL	CLT	DOV	RSD	POC	MCH	DAY	POC	TAL	GLN														81st	58	
1988	Bob Clark Motorsports	31	Olds																			MCH; 35	BRI	DAR	RCH	DOV	MAR	CLT	NWS	CAR	PHO	ATL			81st	58	

===== Daytona 500 =====
Year	Team	Manufacturer	Start	Finish
1967	Robert Harper	Chevrolet	44	11
1968	Holman-Moody	Ford	7	40
1969	Matthews Racing	Ford	7	3
1970	Matthews Racing	Ford	7	35
1971	Matthews Racing	Mercury	11	26
1973	DiGard Motorsports	Chevrolet	DNQ	
1974	DiGard Motorsports	Chevrolet	7	6
1975	DiGard Motorsports	Chevrolet	**1**	28
1977	Ellington Racing	Chevrolet	**1**	30
1978	Ellington Racing	Oldsmobile	7	39
1979	Ellington Racing	Oldsmobile	2	4
1980	Ellington Racing	Oldsmobile	2	7
1981	Kennie Childers Racing	Oldsmobile	33	12
1982	Ogden Racing	Buick	29	34
1987	Gray Racing	Chevrolet	DNQ	
1988	AAG Racing	Buick	DNQ	

==== Busch Series ====
NASCAR Busch Series results
Year	Team	No.	Make	1	2	3	4	5	6	7	8	9	10	11	12	13	14	15	16	17	18	19	20	21	22	23	24	25	26	27	28	29	30	31	NBSC	Pts	Ref
1984	A.G. Dillard Motorsports	22	Olds	DAY	RCH	CAR	HCY	MAR	DAR	ROU	NSV	LGY	MLW	DOV	CLT	SBO	HCY	ROU	SBO	ROU	HCY	IRP	LGY	SBO	BRI	DAR	RCH	NWS	CLT; 8	HCY	CAR	MAR			72nd	142	
1986	Collins Engineering	23	Buick	DAY; 5	CAR	HCY	MAR	BRI	DAR; 9	SBO	LGY	JFC	DOV	CLT; 40	SBO	HCY	ROU	IRP	SBO	RAL	OXF	SBO	HCY	LGY	ROU	BRI	DAR; 35	RCH	DOV	MAR	ROU	CLT; 11	CAR; 30	MAR	38th	597	
1987	Collins Engineering	23	Buick	DAY; 21	HCY	MAR; 9	DAR; 29	BRI; 28	LGY	SBO	CLT; 29	DOV	IRP; 16	ROU	JFC	OXF	SBO	HCY	RAL	LGY	ROU	BRI	JFC	DAR; 34	RCH	DOV	MAR; 15	CLT; 12	CAR; 7	MAR					34th	957	
1988	Collins Engineering	23	Buick	DAY; 23	HCY	CAR	MAR	DAR	BRI	LNG	NZH	SBO	NSV	CLT; 13	DOV	ROU	LAN	LVL	MYB	OXF	SBO	HCY	LNG	IRP	ROU	BRI	DAR	RCH	DOV	MAR	CLT; DNQ	CAR	MAR		63rd	218	
1989	Collins Engineering	23	Buick	DAY; 37	CAR	MAR	HCY	DAR	BRI	NZH	SBO	LAN	NSV	CLT	DOV	ROU	LVL	VOL	MYB	SBO	HCY	DUB	IRP	ROU	BRI	DAR	RCH	DOV	MAR	CLT	CAR	MAR			94th	52	

=== International Race of Champions ===
(key) (Bold – Pole position. * – Most laps led.)

International Race of Champions results
Year	Make	Q1	Q2	Q3	1	2	Pos.	Pts	Ref
1978–79	Chevy	MCH; 3	MCH	RSD	RSD; 10	ATL; 11	10th	NA	
1979–80	Chevy	MCH; 8	MCH	RSD	RSD	ATL	NA	0	

=== American open-wheel racing ===
(key) (Races in bold indicate pole position)

==== USAC Championship Car ====
USAC Championship Car results
Year	Team	Chassis	Engine	1	2	3	4	5	6	7	8	9	10	11	12	13	14	15	16	17	18	Pos.	Pts
1970	Foyt-Greer Racing	Eagle 67	Ford 159ci V8t	PHX	SON	TRE	INDY; 4	MIL	LAN	CDR	MCH	IRP	ISF	MIL	ONT	DSF	INF	SED	TRE	SAC	PHX	20th	600
1971	Foyt-Greer Racing	Coyote 71	Ford 159ci V8t	RAF	RAF	PHX	TRE	INDY; 6		POC; 28	MCH	MIL	ONT; 24	TRE	PHX							NC	0
1971	Foyt-Greer Racing	Coyote 69	Ford 159ci V8t						MIL; 17													NC	0

===== Indianapolis 500 =====
Year	Chassis	Engine	Start	Finish	Team
1970	Eagle	Ford	20	4	Foyt-Greer Racing
1971	Coyote	Ford	20	6	Foyt-Greer Racing

Achievements
Preceded by Pete Hamilton	Snowball Derby Winner; 1975	Succeeded by Darrell Waltrip
Awards
Preceded by Mark Donohue	Indianapolis 500 Rookie of the Year; 1970	Succeeded by Denny Zimmerman
