= 1967 Gwyn Staley 400 =

American NASCAR auto race in 1967

Race details
- Race 13 of 49 in the 1967 NASCAR Grand National Series season
- North Wilkesboro Speedway
- Date: April 16, 1967
- Official name: Gwyn Staley 400
- Location: North Wilkesboro Speedway, North Wilkesboro, North Carolina
- Course: Permanent racing facility
- Course length: 0.625 miles (1.005 km)
- Distance: 400 laps, 250 mi (402 km)
- Weather: Very hot with temperatures of 84 °F (29 °C); wind speeds of 7 miles per hour (11 km/h)
- Average speed: 93.954 miles per hour (151.204 km/h)
- Attendance: 9,400

Pole position
Driver	Darel Dieringer	Junior Johnson

Most laps led
Driver	Darel Dieringer	Junior Johnson
- Laps: 400

Winner
No. 26	Darel Dieringer	Junior Johnson

Television in the United States
- Network: untelevised
- Announcers: none

The 1967 Gwyn Staley 400 was a NASCAR Grand National Series event that was held on April 16, 1967, at North Wilkesboro Speedway in North Wilkesboro, North Carolina.

== Background ==
Through the 1960s and 1970s the NASCAR Grand National Series began focusing on bigger, faster, and longer tracks. Like other short tracks in NASCAR at the time, crowd capacity and purses were small compared to the larger tracks. Over time, Enoch Staley and Jack Combs attempted to keep the facility modern and on pace with the growth of the sport. The West Grandstand was rebuilt with chair-type seats rather than the old bare concrete slabs. New larger restroom facilities were built, and the South Grandstand was expanded. A garage facility was also built within the track, which at the time was rare for short-track venues. But the main focus was on keeping ticket prices affordable. Food and beverage prices were kept low, and event parking and camping were always free. As long as profits covered maintenance costs, Staley was satisfied with the income of the track.

In the Gwyn Staley 160 of 1960, Junior Johnson beat 21 other drivers for the pole position with a lap speed of 83.860 mph. Glen Wood overtook Johnson to lead the first lap, but Johnson had the race under control and led the next 145 laps. Lee Petty moved up from the eighth starting position to challenge Johnson late in the race. With 14 laps remaining, Johnson and Petty made contact. Johnson's car was sent spinning into the guardrail. Petty lead the final 14 laps to win his third straight race at North Wilkesboro. The crowd of 9,200 pelted Petty with bottles, rocks, and debris after his win; he had done their local hero wrong. When Petty took the microphone in Victory Lane to explain his side of the story, the crowd began jeering. Rex White finished second, and Wood placed third. Ned Jarrett finished fourth under the alias John Lentz.

The length of the fall race in 1960 was increased from its usual 160 laps / 100 miles to 320 laps / 200 miles, this it became known as the Wilkes 320. Speeds increased immensely from the previous record, 1.83 seconds quicker than any previous qualifying lap (86.806 to 93.399 mph). Rex White posted the fastest qualifying lap and dethroned Lee Petty from his three-race winning streak at North Wilkesboro. Junior Johnson finished about half a lap behind White in second place.

In the 1961 running of the Gwyn Staley 400, Junior Johnson recorded another pole, this time by 0.57 seconds better than the previous track record, with his qualifying time of 23.52 (95.660 mph). Johnson led all of the 62 laps he ran before transmission problems forced him out of the race. Fred Lorenzen led the next 61 laps until engine problems took him out of the running. And Curtis Turner led 56 laps before experiencing problems as well. 1960 Grand National Champion Rex White, who started on the outside pole, led the remaining 221 laps and won the race. Tommy Irwin started the race in sixth position and finished the Gwyn Staley 400 two laps behind White. Richard Petty followed in third place. Fireball Roberts, in a Pontiac owned by Smokey Yunick, finished fourth (ten laps down), and Johnny Allen, who crashed out of the race on his 387th lap, still finished in fifth place. Only 12 of the 25 cars that entered the race were running at the finish of the first 400-lap edition of the Gwyn Staley race.

In the 1963 Wilkes 400, Fred Lorenzen captured his third straight pole at the track by breaking his own record with a lap time of 23.30 seconds / 96.566 mph. Richard Petty entered the race in an attempt to become the first driver to win four consecutive races at North Wilkesboro. But he experienced engine problems and lasted only 45 laps into the race. Lorenzen led 58 laps, but came up short of victory, six seconds behind winner Marvin Panch. Panch did not start the 1963 season until halfway through because he had nearly lost his life in a crash while testing a Maserati at Daytona that February. Panch, in a Wood Brothers car, started third and led 131 laps in the race. Holman-Moody took the next three spots in the final rundown, with Lorenzen second, Nelson Stacy third, and Fireball Roberts fourth. Stacy started fourth and led 56 laps, while Roberts started from the outside pole and led the most laps with 155.

The track was repaved just prior to the Gwyn Staley 400 in 1964, and the resulting lack of traction wreaked havoc. Fireball Roberts, Buck Baker, Buddy Arrington, and G.C. Spencer all crashed through the wooden guardrail in the first and second turns in Saturday's practice and qualifying. Roberts was unable to start the race because his Ford had been so heavily damaged. Fred Lorenzen won the pole and led 368 laps on the way to the win.

Junior Johnson was the pole sitter for the 1965 Gwyn Staley 400, with a qualifying time and speed of 22.27 seconds / 101.033 mph, breaking his own record by 0.06 seconds. Marvin Panch was leading the race when a blown tire caused him to crash with 11 laps remaining. Johnson assumed the lead from there and won his third of 13 wins in 1965. Johnson lead during most of the race, 356 laps in total. Bobby Johns in a Holman-Moody Ford finished in the runner-up position, seven seconds behind Johnson. Finishing third, one lap down, was Ned Jarrett. Jarrett had led 20 laps early in the race. Dick Hutcherson, in his Holman-Moody Ford, finished seven laps off the pace in fourth place, and Panch finished fifth. Panch led on three occasions during the race for a total of 24 laps.

In the Wilkes 400 of 1965, Fred Lorenzen won the pole and led the first 190 laps before engine problems forced him out of the race on Lap 219. Junior Johnson took the lead from the fading Lorenzen to pick up his 50th and final Grand National Series victory by two laps over Cale Yarborough. Only 16 of the 35 cars that entered the race were running at the finish.

Jim Paschal started the 1966 Gwyn Staley 400 from the pole position with a record lap time and speed of 21.91 sec / 102.693 mph. Paschal led 308 laps and won by six laps over G.C. Spencer, the largest margin of victory at North Wilkesboro in a Grand National Series race. David Pearson started on the outside pole, and despite losing an engine with 18 laps to go he finished third. Wendell Scott finished fourth (22 laps down), and Clarence Henly Gray finished fifth (25 laps down). Only 14 of the 37 cars entered in the race were running at the finish. Richard Petty was the only driver besides Paschal to lead any laps in the race. He led 92 laps before falling back to finish 11th (53 laps down).

== Race report ==
Darel Dieringer managed to defeat Cale Yarborough by at least one lap in front of 9400 live spectators despite running out of gas in turn 4 of the last lap. While the pole position speed was 104.603 miles per hour (168.342 km/h), the actual racing speeds approached 93.594 miles per hour (150.625 km/h). Two hours and forty minutes were required to fully resolve 400 laps of action that took place on a paved track spanning 0.675 miles (1.086 km). Six cautions were handed out by NASCAR officials for 33 laps. Larry Miller received the last-place finish due to a problem related to his brakes during the first lap of the race.

G.C. Spencer's vehicle developed engine problems on lap 4. A problematic clutch would send Friday Hassler out of the race on lap 31. Harold Stockton's engine stopped working properly on lap 49 while Sam McQuagg's vehicle overheated on lap 50. A driveshaft problem ended Eddie Yarboro's day on lap 85 while a problematic ignition knocked out Paul Goldsmith on lap 95. Buddy Arrington's vehicle overheated on lap 126 while David Pearson suffered a similar fate on lap 134. Dick Johnson's vehicle would have a blown engine on lap 178 while lap 203 would see Earl Brooks be eliminated from the race due to the same problem.

Dieringer would make his last NASCAR Cup Series victory during this race. He was the first driver to run a race over 250 miles, and lead start to finish.

David Pearson would leave Cotton Owens' team (for Holman Moody) after this race was finished.

The transition to purpose-built racecars began in the early 1960s and occurred gradually over that decade. Changes made to the sport by the late 1960s brought an end to the "strictly stock" vehicles of the 1950s.

Notable crew chiefs attending this race include Dale Inman and Glen Wood.

=== Qualifying ===
Grid	No.	Driver	Manufacturer	Owner
1	26	Darel Dieringer	'67 Ford	Junior Johnson
2	43	Richard Petty	'67 Plymouth	Petty Enterprises
3	14	Jim Paschal	'67 Plymouth	Tom Friedkin
4	21	Cale Yarborough	'67 Ford	Wood Brothers
5	6	David Pearson	'67 Dodge	Cotton Owens
6	1	Paul Lewis	'67 Dodge	A.J. King
7	99	Paul Goldsmith	'67 Plymouth	Ray Nichels
8	29	Dick Hutcherson	'67 Ford	Bondy Long
9	4	John Sears	'66 Ford	L.G. DeWitt
10	2	Bobby Allison	'65 Chevrolet	Donald Brackins

== Finishing order ==
1. Darel Dieringer
2. Cale Yarborough
3. Dick Hutcherson
4. Jim Paschal
5. Paul Lewis
6. Bobby Allison
7. Richard Petty
8. John Sears
9. James Hylton
10. J.T. Putney
11. Clyde Lynn
12. Buck Baker
13. Wendell Scott
14. Bill Seifert
15. Tiny Lund
16. Larry Manning
17. Wayne Smith
18. Elmo Langley
19. Max Ledbetter
20. Roy Mayne
21. George Poulos
22. Henley Gray
23. Paul Dean Holt
24. Earl Brooks
25. Dick Johnson
26. David Pearson
27. Buddy Arrington
28. Paul Goldsmith
29. Eddie Yarboro
30. Sam McQuagg
31. Harold Stockton
32. Friday Hassler
33. G.C. Spencer
34. Larry Miller

Preceded by 1967 Hickory 250	NASCAR Grand National Series Season; 1967	Succeeded by 1967 Virginia 500
