= 1967 Atlanta 500 =

American NASCAR auto race in 1967

Race details
- Race 10 of 49 in the 1967 NASCAR Grand National Series season
- Layout of Atlanta International Raceway, used until 1996
- Date: April 2, 1967
- Official name: Atlanta 500
- Location: Atlanta International Raceway, Hampton, Georgia
- Course: Permanent racing facility
- Course length: 1.500 miles (2.400 km)
- Distance: 334 laps, 501.0 mi (804 km)
- Weather: Temperatures of 80.1 °F (26.7 °C); wind speeds of 8 miles per hour (13 km/h)
- Average speed: 131.238 miles per hour (211.207 km/h)
- Attendance: 70,000

Pole position
| Driver | Cale Yarborough | Wood Brothers |

Most laps led
| Driver | Cale Yarborough | Wood Brothers |
- Laps: 301

Winner
| No. 21 | Cale Yarborough | Wood Brothers |

Television in the United States
- Network: untelevised
- Announcers: none

The 1967 Atlanta 500 was a NASCAR Grand National Series event that was held on April 2, 1967, at Atlanta International Raceway in Hampton, Georgia.

The transition to purpose-built racecars began in the early 1960s and occurred gradually over that decade. Changes made to the sport by the late 1960s brought an end to the "strictly stock" vehicles of the 1950s.

== Background ==
Atlanta International Raceway (now Atlanta Motor Speedway) is one of ten current intermediate tracks to hold NASCAR races. The layout at Atlanta International Speedway at the time was a four-turn traditional oval track that is 1.54 miles (2.48 km) long. The track's turns are banked at twenty-four degrees, while the front stretch, the location of the finish line, and the back stretch are banked at five.

== Race report ==
There were 44 American-born drivers on the grid; Cale Yarborough defeated Dick Hutcherson by more than one lap in front of 70,000 audience members. Yarborough would score his second career win, along with his first win of 1967, and end a 31-race drought. The race lasted nearly four hours with the average speed being 131.288 miles per hour (211.288 km/h). Yarborough's qualifying speed was 148.996 miles per hour (239.786 km/h). Veteran NASCAR owner Nord Krauskopf would employ drivers Charlie Glotzbach and Bobby Isaac during the race. Blackie Watt would finish in last-place on lap 2 due to engine failure. Meanwhile, windshield problems would knock Don White out of the race at lap 193 of 334. Six cautions slowed the field for 39 laps.

Fred Lorenzen would race for the final time in his legendary #28 white and blue 1967 Ford Fairlane machine that would make him popular in NASCAR. Curtis Turner, who was driving a Chevrolet owned by Smokey Yunick, would escape being injured in a practice crash.

The purse for this race was $64,995 ($627,571 when adjusted for inflation); the winner's share was $21,035 ($203,107 when adjusted for inflation) while last place received $540 ($5,214 when adjusted for inflation).

=== Qualifying ===
| Grid | No. | Driver | Manufacturer | Owner |
|---|---|---|---|---|
| 1 | 21 | Cale Yarborough | '67 Ford | Wood Brothers |
| 2 | 43 | Richard Petty | '67 Plymouth | Petty Enterprises |
| 3 | 28 | Fred Lorenzen | '67 Ford | Holman-Moody Racing |
| 4 | 6 | David Pearson | '67 Dodge | Cotton Owens |
| 5 | 27 | A.J. Foyt | '67 Ford | Banjo Matthews |
| 6 | 42 | Tiny Lund | '67 Plymouth | Petty Enterprises |
| 7 | 26 | Darel Dieringer | '67 Ford | Junior Johnson |
| 8 | 14 | Jim Paschal | '67 Plymouth | Tom Friedkin |
| 9 | 29 | Dick Hutcherson | '67 Ford | Bondy Long |
| 10 | 3 | Buddy Baker | '67 Dodge | Ray Fox |

Failed to qualify: Ben Lane (#78)

== Finishing order ==
Section reference:

1. Cale Yarborough
2. Dick Hutcherson
3. Buddy Baker
4. Charlie Glotzbach
5. Bobby Isaac
6. James Hylton
7. Friday Hassler
8. John Sears
9. Donnie Allison
10. G.C. Spencer
11. J.T. Putney
12. Donnie Allison
13. Sonny Hutchins
14. Buddy Arrington
15. Jim Paschal
16. Bill Champion
17. Paul Lewis
18. Sam McQuagg
19. Mario Andretti
20. Tiny Lund
21. David Pearson
22. Richard Petty
23. Darel Dieringer
24. Don White
25. Wayne Smith
26. Elmo Langley
27. A. J. Foyt
28. Fred Lorenzen
29. Roy Mayne
30. LeeRoy Yarbrough
31. Paul Goldsmith
32. Bay Darnell
33. Jack Harden
34. Neil Castles
35. Bobby Johns
36. Frank Warren
37. Eldon Yarborough
38. John Martin
39. Clyde Lynn
40. Wendell Scott
41. Gordon Johncock
42. Dick Johnson
43. Bill Seifert
44. Blackie Watt

== Timeline ==
Section reference:

- Start of race: Cale Yarborough was leading the pack when the green flag was waved.
- Lap 2: Blackie Watt had some engine issues which forced him out of the race.
- Lap 4: Bill Seifert had some engine issues which forced him out of the race.
- Lap 5: Dick Johnson had some engine issues which forced him out of the race.
- Lap 9: Gordon Johncock had a terminal crash.
- Lap 10: Wendell Scott had some engine issues which forced him out of the race.
- Lap 13: Clyde Lynn had some engine issues which forced him out of the race.
- Lap 44: An oil leak in his vehicle took John Martin out of the race.
- Lap 46: Eldon Yarbrough managed to overheat his vehicle.
- Lap 54: Frank Warren just could not handle the vehicle's faulty transmission and left the race.
- Lap 61: Darel Dieringer took over the lead from Cale Yarborough.
- Lap 68: Fred Lorenzen took over the lead from Darel Dieringer.
- Lap 70: Cale Yarborough took over the lead from Fred Lorenzen.
- Lap 80: Bobby Johns had some engine issues which forced him out of the race.
- Lap 100: Fred Lorenzen took over the lead from Cale Yarborough.
- Lap 101: Cale Yarborough took over the lead from Fred Lorenzen.
- Lap 114: Neil Castles' vehicle developed some issues with its suspension.
- Lap 120: Jack Harden had a terminal crash.
- Lap 123: The differential on Bay Darnell's care developed some serious issues.
- Lap 152: Mario Andretti took over the lead from Cale Yarborough.
- Lap 153: Paul Goldsmith managed to overheat his vehicle.
- Lap 158: Cale Yarborough took over the lead from Mario Andretti.
- Lap 162: LeeRoy Yarbrough had some engine issues which forced him out of the race.
- Lap 173: Fred Lorenzen had a terminal crash.
- Lap 174: A.J. Foyt had some engine issues which forced him out of the race.
- Lap 175: Elmo Langley had some engine issues which forced him out of the race.
- Lap 180: Buddy Baker took over the lead from Cale Yarborough.
- Lap 184: Wayne Smith had some engine issues which forced him out of the race.
- Lap 193: Don White's vehicle suffered from a troublesome windshield.
- Lap 195: Darel Dieringer had some engine issues which forced him out of the race.
- Lap 197: Cale Yarborough took over the lead from Buddy Baker.
- Lap 215: Richard Petty had some engine issues which forced him out of the race.
- Lap 224: A faulty ignition ended David Pearson's hopes of winning the race.
- Lap 246: Tiny Lund had some engine issues which forced him out of the race.
- Lap 261: Mario Andretti had a terminal crash.
- Lap 277: Sam McQuagg's vehicle developed some problems with its suspension.
- Finish: Cale Yarborough was officially declared the winner of the event.

| Preceded by 1967 untitled race at Bowman-Gray Stadium | NASCAR Grand National Series Season; 1967 | Succeeded by 1967 Columbia 200 |
