= 1967 Fireball 300 =

American NASCAR auto race in 1967

Race details
- Race 6 of 49 in the 1967 NASCAR Grand National Series season
- Date: March 5, 1967; 59 years ago
- Official name: Fireball 300
- Location: Asheville-Weaverville Speedway, Weaverville, North Carolina
- Course: Permanent racing facility
- Course length: 0.500 miles (0.804 km)
- Distance: 300 laps, 150 mi (241 km)
- Weather: Chilly with temperatures of 71.1 °F (21.7 °C); wind speeds of 15 miles per hour (24 km/h)
- Average speed: 83.360 miles per hour (134.155 km/h)
- Attendance: 9,500

Pole position
Driver	Darel Dieringer	Junior Johnson & Associates

Most laps led
Driver	Richard Petty	Petty Enterprises
- Laps: 150

Winner
No. 43	Richard Petty	Petty Enterprises

Television in the United States
- Network: untelevised
- Announcers: none

The 1967 Fireball 300 was a NASCAR Grand National Series event that was held on March 5, 1967, at Asheville-Weaverville Speedway in Weaverville, North Carolina.

The name of the race was named after NASCAR Hall of Fame inductee Fireball Roberts, who died in 1964 following an accident in that year's World 600 in Charlotte, North Carolina.

== Race report ==
This was the historic site of Richard Petty's 50th career win in front of 9,500 people in what is now known as the Cup Series. The average speed of the race was 83.360 miles per hour (134.155 km/h) on a paved oval track spanning 0.500 miles (0.805 km) for three hundred laps. It took one hour and forty-seven minutes for the race to reach its conclusion; Petty defeating Darel Dieringer by outlapping him twice. All twenty-two racers were from the United States of America.

Total winnings for this race were $7,150 ($69,038 when adjusted for inflation). Individual earnings for each driver ranged from the winner's share of $1,800 ($17,380 when adjusted for inflation) to the last-place finisher's portion of $100 ($966 when adjusted for inflation).

Jim Conway would retire from NASCAR Cup Series competition after this event. The transition to purpose-built racecars began in the early 1960s and occurred gradually over that decade. Changes made to the sport by the late 1960s brought an end to the "strictly stock" vehicles of the 1950s.

=== Qualifying ===
Grid	No.	Driver	Manufacturer	Owner
1	26	Darel Dieringer	'67 Ford	Junior Johnson
2	43	Richard Petty	'67 Plymouth	Petty Enterprises
3	14	Jim Paschal	'65 Plymouth	Tom Friedkin
4	2	Bobby Allison	'66 Chevrolet	Donald Brackins
5	4	John Sears	'66 Ford	L.G. DeWitt
6	6	David Pearson	'66 Dodge	Cotton Owens
7	88	Buck Baker	'66 Oldsmobile	Buck Baker
8	64	Elmo Langley	'66 Ford	Elmo Langley / Henry Woodfield
9	19	J.T. Putney	'66 Chevrolet	J.T. Putney
10	75	Earl Brooks	'66 Ford	Gene Black
11	34	Wendell Scott	'65 Ford	Wendell Scott
12	09	Neil Castles	'66 Chevrolet	Garland Miller
13	31	Paul Dean Holt	'66 Ford	Ralph Murphy
14	91	Jim Conway	'65 Plymouth	Neil Castles
15	48	James Hylton	'65 Dodge	Bud Hartje
16	00	Paul Lewis	'65 Dodge	Emory Gilliam
17	20	Clyde Lynn	'66 Ford	Clyde Lynn
18	97	Henley Gray	'66 Ford	Henley Gray
19	46	Roy Mayne	'66 Chevrolet	Tom Hunter
20	45	Bill Seifert	'65 Ford	Bill Seifert
21	38	Wayne Smith	'66 Chevrolet	Archie Smith
22	9	Roy Tyner	'66 Chevrolet	Truett Rogers

== Finishing order ==
Section reference:

1. Richard Petty (No. 43)
2. Darel Dieringer (No. 26)
3. Bobby Allison (No. 2)
4. David Pearson (No. 6)
5. John Sears (No. 4)
6. J.T. Putney (No. 19)
7. Paul Lewis (No. 00)
8. Elmo Langley (No. 64)
9. Clyde Lynn (No. 20)
10. Wendell Scott (No. 34)
11. Bill Seifert (No. 45)
12. Henley Gray (No. 97)
13. Paul Dean Holt (No. 31)
14. Jim Conway* (No. 91)
15. Wayne Smith* (No. 38)
16. Roy Tyner* (No. 9)
17. Roy Mayne* (No. 46)
18. Neil Castles* (No. 09)
19. Earl Brooks* (No. 75)
20. James Hylton* (No. 44)
21. Buck Baker* (No. 88)
22. Jim Paschal* (No. 14)

* Driver failed to finish race

== Timeline ==
Section reference:

- Start of race: Darel Dieringer officially began the race with the pole position.
- Lap 41: Jim Paschal's race would be ruined by his vehicle's faulty wiring.
- Lap 51: Engine issues forced Buck Baker out of the race.
- Lap 88: James Hylton's vehicle had a nasty engine problem.
- Lap 93: Problematic lug nuts would drive Earl Brooks out of the event.
- Lap 100: Neil Castles blamed his terrible performance on some nasty clutch issues.
- Lap 104: Richard Petty took over the lead from Darel Dieringer.
- Lap 109: The problems with Roy Mayne's differential knocked him out of the race.
- Lap 116: Darel Dieringer took over the lead from Richard Petty.
- Lap 119: Bobby Allison took over the lead from Darel Dieringer.
- Lap 128: The problems with Roy Tyner's differential knocked him out of the race.
- Lap 144: Richard Petty took over the lead from Bobby Allison.
- Lap 157: The problems with Wayne Smith's differential knocked him out of the race.
- Lap 215: Darel Dieringer took over the lead from Richard Petty.
- Lap 234: Richard Petty took over the lead from Darel Dieringer.
- Finish: Richard Petty was the official winner of the event.

Preceded by 1967 Augusta 300	Richard Petty's Career Wins; 1960-1984	Succeeded by 1967 Columbia 200
Preceded by 1966	NASCAR Fireball 300 Races; 1965-1969	Succeeded by 1968
