= Jim Paschal =

American racing driver (1926–2004)

James Roy "Jim" Paschal, Jr.
- Born: December 5, 1926; High Point, North Carolina, U.S.
- Died: July 5, 2004 (aged 77); Atlanta, Georgia, U.S.
- Cause of death: Cancer
- Achievements: 1964, 1967 World 600 Winner

NASCAR Cup Series career
- 421 races run over 23 years
- Best finish: 5th (1956)
- First race: 1949 Race No. 1 (Charlotte)
- Last race: 1972 World 600 (Charlotte)
- First win: 1953 Race #36 (Martinsville)
- Last win: 1967 Race #27 (Montgomery)
Wins	Top tens	Poles
25	230	12

NASCAR Grand National East Series career
- 9 races run over 1 year
- Best finish: 12th (1972)
- First race: 1972 Hickory 276 (Hickory)
- Last race: 1972 Gamecock 200 (Columbia)
Wins	Top tens	Poles
0	4	1
- Statistics up to date as of April 20, 2013.

James Roy Paschal Jr. (December 5, 1926 – July 5, 2004) was an American NASCAR Grand National Series and Winston Cup Series driver.

== Career summary ==
Paschal won twenty-five races and twelve poles over his career. Elected to the "Stock Car Racing Hall of Fame" in 1977, he won the World 600 in 1964 and 1967 at Charlotte Speedway. He competed in the first 18 Southern 500s (1950–1967) and won 16 of 73 Grand American races (1969–1972). Paschal's 1967 win in the World 600 established a race record of 335 laps led, which would not be broken until 2016 when Martin Truex Jr. led 392 laps.

Paschal's strongest racing was found on short tracks where he would finish an average of 11th place. Paschal would find his weakness on road courses, where the sharp corners and the right turns would cause him to finish in an agonizing 27th place on average.

Paschal has the most wins in the Cup series among drivers who are not in the NASCAR Hall of Fame and are eligible.

== Retirement ==
After retiring from racing in 1972, Paschal owned and operated a trucking company and farmed both cattle and poultry.

== Death ==
Paschal died on July 5, 2004, in Atlanta, Georgia following a battle with cancer.

Paschal was buried near Jackson Creek, North Carolina.

== Motorsports career results ==
=== NASCAR ===
(key) (Bold – Pole position awarded by qualifying time. Italics – Pole position earned by points standings or practice time. * – Most laps led. ** – All laps led.)

==== Grand National Series ====
NASCAR Grand National Series results
Year	Team	No.	Make	1	2	3	4	5	6	7	8	9	10	11	12	13	14	15	16	17	18	19	20	21	22	23	24	25	26	27	28	29	30	31	32	33	34	35	36	37	38	39	40	41	42	43	44	45	46	47	48	49	50	51	52	53	54	55	56	57	58	59	60	61	62	NGNC	Pts	Ref
1949	Jim Paschal	60	Ford	CLT; 23	DAB	HBO	LAN	HAM	MAR	HEI	NWS																																																							81st	–	
1950	Al Wheatley	79	Ford	DAB	CLT; 23	LAN	MAR; 2	CAN	VER	DSP	MCF	CLT; 20	HBO	DSP	HAM																																																			24th	220.5	
1950	Julian Buesink	79	Ford													DAR; 53	LAN	NWS	VER																																															24th	220.5	
1950	Ralph Chaney	30	Kaiser																	MAR; 9	WIN																																													24th	220.5	
1950	Hubert Westmoreland	2	Olds																			HBO; 28																																												24th	220.5	
1951	Julian Buesink	80	Olds	DAB	CLT; 31	NMO	GAR																																																											15th	858.5	
1951	Sam Rice	71	Olds					HBO; 8	ASF	NWS																																																								15th	858.5	
1951	Julian Buesink	60	Ford								MAR; 31	CAN	CLS; 4	CLB; 6	DSP	GAR	GRS	BAI	HEI	AWS; 15	MCF	ALS	MSF; 16	FMS	MOR	ABS			CCS; 3	LAN	CLT; 9	DSP	WIL; 4	HBO; 4	TPN	PGS	MAR; 19	OAK	NWS; 14	HMS	JSP; 18																									15th	858.5	
1951	Al Wheatley	60	Ford																								DAR; 39	CLB																																						15th	858.5	
1951	Al Wheatley	55	Cadillac																																							ATL; 27	GAR	NMO																						15th	858.5	
1952	Julian Buesink	60	Ford	PBS	DAB	JSP; 23	NWS; 8	MAR; 10	CLB; 8	ATL; 17	CCS; 6																																																							18th	1694	
1952	George Hutchens	12	Ford									LAN; 11																																																						18th	1694	
1952	John Eanes	41	Hudson										DAR; 9	DSP; 7	CAN	HAY	FMS	HBO	CLT	MSF	NIF	OSW	MON	MOR	PPS	MCF	AWS																																							18th	1694	
1952	George Hutchens	12	Olds																									DAR; 66																																						18th	1694	
1952	George Hutchens	6	Ford																										CCS; 20	LAN	DSP																																			18th	1694	
1952	Buckshot Morris	12	Olds																													WIL; 4	HBO; 17	MAR; 13	NWS; 18	ATL	PBS																													18th	1694	
1953	George Hutchens	12	Olds	PBS	DAB; 41	HAR	NWS		RCH; 21																																																									7th	4211	
1953	George Hutchens	12	Plymouth					CLT; 21		CCS; 21																																																								7th	4211	
1953	Dave Quate	43	Olds								LAN; 29	CLB																																																						7th	4211	
1953	Dave Quate	43	Ford										HCY; 25																																																					7th	4211	
1953	Dave Quate	43	Dodge												MAR; 34	PMS	RSP; 11	LOU																																																7th	4211	
1953	George Hutchens	80	Dodge															FIF; 17	LAN; 3	TCS; 6	WIL	MCF	PIF; 15	MOR; 4	ATL; 13	RVS	LCF	DAV	HBO; 6	AWS; 13	PAS; 5	HCY	DAR; 6	CCS	LAN; 5	**BLF**; 16	WIL	NWS; 23	MAR; 1	ATL; 4																										7th	4211	
1954	George Hutchens	80	Dodge	PBS; 4	DAB; 27	JSP; 24	ATL; 19	OSP; 7	OAK	NWS; 9																																																								7th	3903	
1954	Griffin Motors Racing	87	Olds								HBO; 24	CCS; 3	LAN	**WIL**; 5	MAR; 1*		RSP; 28	CLT	GAR	CLB	LND																																													7th	3903	
1954	Ernest Woods	13	Olds													SHA; 20									PIF; 6	AWS; 10		GRS; 18	MOR; 28	OAK	CLT; 20	SAN																																		7th	3903	
1954	George Hutchens	90	Dodge																			HCY; 21	MCF	WGS																																										7th	3903	
1954	Buckshot Morris	12	Olds																								SFS; 11																																							7th	3903	
1954	Ernest Woods	88	Olds																														**COR**; 19	DAR; 5	CCS; 7	CLT; 23	LAN; 11	MAS; 47	MAR; 6	NWS; 12																										7th	3903	
1955	George Hutchens	80	Plymouth	TCS; 21	PBS	JSP																																																												8th	4572	
1955	Ernest Woods	78	Olds				DAB; 26	OSP; 8	CLB; 8	HBO; 1*	NWS; 16	**MGY**; 9	LAN; 24	CLT; 19	HCY; 3	ASF	TUS	**MAR**; 9	RCH; 4	NCF; 6	FOR; 2	LIN; 27	MCF; 15	FON	AIR	CLT; 7	PIF; 20	CLB; 1	AWS; 3	MOR; 6	ALS; 2	NYF; 5	SAN	CLT; 1*	FOR; 2	MAS; 4	RSP; 26	DAR; 34	MGY; 22	LAN; 36	RSP; 29	GPS; 22	MAS																							8th	4572	
1955	Julian Petty	44	Chevy																																									CLB; 11	MAR; 3	LVP	NWS; 10																			8th	4572	
1955	Bill Blair	22	Olds																																													HBO; 19																		8th	4572	
1956	Julian Petty	44	Chevy	HCY; 5	CLT; 23	WSS	PBS	ASF																																																										5th	7878	
1956	Frank Hayworth	75	Mercury						DAB; 33	PBS; 28	WIL; 4	ATL; 8	NWS; 3	LAN; 9	RCH; 17	CLB; 13			HCY; 18	HBO; 28	MAR; 25	LIN; 2	CLT; 4	POR	EUR	NYF; 2	MER	MAS; 2	CLT; 12	**MCF**; 2	POR	AWS; 2	RSP; 12	PIF	CSF	CHI; 2	CCF; 13	MGY	OKL; 1	ROA; 7	OBS; 5	SAN	NOR; 2	PIF; 2	MYB; 3	POR		CSH; 7	CLT; 9			CLB; 9	HBO; 19	NWP; 19	CLT; 4	CCF; 10	MAR; 31	HCY	WIL; 18							5th	7878	
1956	Bob Welborn	49	Chevy														CON; 9	GPS; 10																																																5th	7878	
1956	Bill Stroppe	26	Mercury																																												DAR; 6			LAN; 4	POR															5th	7878	
1957	Frank Hayworth	75	Mercury	WSS; 4	CON; 6	TIC; 7																														NOR; 3																														10th	5136	
1957	Bill Stroppe	17	Mercury				DAB; 45	CON; 15	WIL; 18	HBO; 12	AWS; 3	NWS; 20	LAN; 6	CLT; 5	PIF; 20	GBF; 12	POR	CCF; 4	RCH; 5	MAR; 10	POR	EUR	LIN; 7	LCS; 7	ASP																																									10th	5136	
1957	Jim Paschal	17	Mercury																							NWP; 5	CLB; 4	CPS	PIF; 8	JAC; 2	RSP; 48	CLT; 7			HCY; 25		LCS; 16	GLN	KPC	LIN; 30	OBS	MYB																								10th	5136	
1957	Sam Rice	80	Pontiac																														MAS; 23	POR																																10th	5136	
1957	Frank Hayworth	75	Ford																																								DAR; 35	NYF	AWS; 13	CSF	SCF																			10th	5136	
1957		6	Ford																																													LAN; 44																		10th	5136	
1957	Jim Paschal	17	Ford																																														CLB; 14	CCF; 21	CLT															10th	5136	
1957	Sam Rice	26	Ford																																																	MAR; 18	NBR	CON	NWS	GBF										10th	5136	
1958	Jim Paschal	15	Ford	FAY	DAB	CON; 12	FAY	WIL	HBO	FAY	CLB	PIF	ATL	CLT	MAR	ODS	OBS	GPS	GBF	STR	NWS	BGS	TRN	RSD	CLB	NBS	REF																																							42nd	928	
1958	Don Angel	37	Ford																									LIN; 7	HCY																																					42nd	928	
1958	Julian Petty	4	Chevy																											AWS; 4	RSP; 10																																			42nd	928	
1958	Julian Petty	49	Chevy																													**MCC**; 1**	SLS	TOR	BUF	MCF	BEL	BRR	CLB	NSV	AWS	BGS	MBS																							42nd	928	
1958	Jim Paschal	15	Chevy																																									DAR; 21	CLT	BIR	CSF	GAF	RCH	HBO	SAS	MAR	NWS	ATL												42nd	928	
1959	Sam Rice	78	Ford	FAY	DAY	DAY	HBO	CON	ATL	WIL	BGS	CLB	NWS	REF	HCY	MAR; 26	TRN	CLT	NSV	ASP	PIF	GPS	ATL	CLB	WIL	RCH	BGS	AWS	DAY	HEI	CLT																																			25th	1792	
1959	Julian Petty	48	Chevy																													MBS; 2	CLT; 2	NSV	AWS	BGS; 21	GPS; 5	CLB																												25th	1792	
1959	Lynton Tyson	88	Chevy																																				DAR; 6	HCY	RCH	CSF	HBO	MAR	AWS	NWS	CON																			25th	1792	
1960	Bob Welborn	49	Chevy	CLT; 19	CLB	DAY	DAY	DAY	CLT	NWS	PHO	CLB	MAR	HCY	WIL	BGS	GPS	AWS	DAR	PIF	HBO	RCH	HMS	CLT	BGS	DAY; 13	HEI	MAB	MBS																																					9th	8968	
1960	Petty Enterprises	44	Plymouth																											ATL; 6	BIR	NSV; 7	AWS; 22	PIF	CLB	SBO	BGS	DAR; 3	HCY	CSF	GSP	HBO	MAR; 4	NWS; 10	CLT; 8	RCH	ATL; 3																			9th	8968	
1961	John Masoni	3	Pontiac	CLT	JSP	DAY; 2	DAY	DAY; 49	PIF																																																									9th	13922	
1961	Petty Enterprises	42	Plymouth							AWS; 13	HMS	ATL	GPS	HBO	BGS	MAR	NWS	CLB	HCY	RCH	MAR	DAR	CLT	CLT	RSD	ASP																																								9th	13922	
1961	Julian Petty	14	Pontiac																								CLT; 5	PIF; 1	BIR; 2	GPS; 5	BGS; 11	NOR; 6	HAS	STR; 3	DAY	ATL; DNQ		MBS; 2																												9th	13922	
1961	Julian Petty	14	Chevy																																		CLB; 2*																													9th	13922	
1961	Julian Petty	44	Pontiac																																				BRI; 8	NSV; 1	BGS	**AWS**; 6	RCH	SBO	DAR; 4	HCY	RCH; 5	CSF	ATL; 13	MAR; 19	NWS; 21	CLT	BRI; 4	GPS; 10	HBO; 20											9th	13922	
1962	Julian Petty	44	Pontiac	CON	AWS; 8																																																													6th	18128	
1962	Cliff Stewart Racing	2	Pontiac			DAY; 15	DAY	DAY; 14	CON; 6	AWS; 2	SVH; 11	HBO; 3	RCH; 16	CLB; 4	NWS; 26	GPS; 2	MBS; 18	MAR	BGS; 8	BRI; 32	RCH; 5	HCY; 4	CON; 16	DAR; 22	PIF; 2	CLT; 32	ATL; 10	BGS; 15	AUG; 4	RCH; 1	SBO; 20	DAY	CLB; 16	ASH	GPS	AUG	SVH; 5	MBS; 13		CHT; 3		HUN; 3																								6th	18128	
1962	Petty Enterprises	42	Plymouth																																				BRI; 1		NSV; 1*		AWS; 1*	STR	BGS	PIF	VAL	DAR; 6	HCY						CLT; 6	ATL; 17										6th	18128	
1962	Petty Enterprises	41	Plymouth																																															RCH; 2	DTS	AUG	MAR; 9	NWS; 5												6th	18128	
1963	Petty Enterprises	41	Plymouth	**BIR**; 1*	GGS; 2	THS; 1	RSD; 36	DAY	DAY; 23				HBO; 2	ATL; 14	HCY; 4	BRI; 21	AUG			SBO; 2		MAR; 8	NWS; 4	CLB		DAR; 6																						DAR; 22	HCY	RCH	MAR	DTS	NWS													19th	13456	
1963	Petty Enterprises	42	Plymouth							DAY; 36	PIF; 3	AWS; 19																	CLT; 42	BIR	ATL; 30									BRI; 3	GPS	NSV; 1	CLB	AWS; 3	PIF	BGS	ONA; 3																			19th	13456	
1963	Petty Enterprises	43	Plymouth															RCH; 19	GPS; 8		BGS; 1**				THS; 1		ODS; 3	RCH; 14																																						19th	13456	
1963	Fox Racing	31	Chevy																													DAY; 23	MBS	SVH	DTS	BGS	ASH	OBS	BRR																											19th	13456	
1963	Cliff Stewart Racing	2	Pontiac																																																			THS; 16												19th	13456	
1963	Fox Racing	03	Chevy																																																				CLT; 22	SBO	HBO	RSD								19th	13456	
1964	Owens Racing	5	Dodge	CON	AUG	JSP	SVH	RSD	DAY	DAY; 5	DAY; 5	RCH; 14	BRI; 7	GPS; 10	BGS; 4	ATL; 8	AWS	HBO	PIF	CLB	NWS; 10	MAR; 21	SVH																																											7th	25450	
1964	Petty Enterprises	41	Plymouth																					DAR; 12	LGY	HCY	SBO	CLT; 1*	GPS	ASH	ATL; 6	CON	NSV	CHT	BIR	VAL	PIF	DAY; 5	ODS	OBS	BRR	ISP	GLN	LIN	BRI; 3	NSV; 2	MBS	AWS; 30	DTS	ONA; 4	CLB	BGS	STR	DAR; 2	HCY				MAR; 25	SVH	NWS; 21	CLT; 2	HAR	AUG	JAC	7th	25450	
1964	Petty Enterprises	43	Plymouth																																																					RCH; 22	ODS	HBO								7th	25450	
1965	Toy Bolton	41	Chevy	RSD	DAY	DAY	DAY	PIF	AWS	RCH	HBO	ATL	GPS	NWS	MAR	CLB	BRI	DAR; 16	LGY	BGS	HCY	CLT; 23	CCF	ASH	HAR	NSV	BIR																																							35th	6046	
1965	Friedkin Enterprises	41	Chevy																									ATL; 31	GPS	MBS	VAL	DAY	ODS	OBS	ISP	GLN	BRI; 4	NSV	CCF	AWS	SMR	PIF	AUG	CLB	DTS	BLV	BGS	DAR; 22	HCY	LIN	ODS	RCH; 20	MAR	NWS												35th	6046	
1965	Toy Bolton	4	Chevy																																																				CLT; 33											35th	6046	
1965	Petty Enterprises	43	Plymouth																																																					HBO; 3										35th	6046	
1965	Petty Enterprises	42	Plymouth																																																						CAR; 5	DTS; 4								35th	6046	
1966	Gary Weaver	10	Ford	AUG; 4	RSD	DAY																																																												14th	16404	
1966	Friedkin Enterprises	14	Plymouth				DAY; 8	DAY; 11	CAR; 20		ATL; 5	HCY	CLB	GPS	BGS	**NWS**; 1*	**MAR**; 1*	DAR; 6	LGY	MGR	MON	RCH	CLT; 21	DTS	ASH	PIF	SMR	AWS	BLV	GPS	DAY; 3	ODS	BRR	OXF	FON	ISP	BRI; 26	SMR	NSV	ATL; 26	CLB	AWS	BLV	BGS	DAR; 6	HCY	RCH	HBO	MAR; 34	NWS; 4	CLT; 24	CAR; 8														14th	16404	
1966	Petty Enterprises	43	Plymouth							BRI; 20																																																								14th	16404	
1967	Friedkin Enterprises	14	Plymouth	AUG; 15	RSD; 19	DAY; 6	DAY	DAY; 32	AWS; 22	BRI; 17	GPS; 2	BGS; 13	ATL; 15	CLB; 2	HCY; 4	NWS; 4	MAR; 34	SVH; 3	RCH; 9	DAR; 14	BLV; 1	LGY; 11	CLT; 1*	ASH; 1	MGR; 13	SMR; 2	**BIR**; 2*	CAR; 10	GPS; 20	MGY; 1*	DAY; 9	TRN; 3	OXF; 3	FDA; 17	ISP; 5	BRI; 4	SMR; 22	NSV; 25	ATL; 28	BGS; 2	CLB; 20	SVH	DAR; 9	HCY; 3*	RCH	BLV; 3	HBO	MAR; 5	NWS; 5	CLT; 25	CAR; 35															6th	27624	
1967	Friedkin Enterprises	40	Plymouth																																																	AWS; 28														6th	27624	
1968	Friedkin Enterprises	14	Plymouth	MGR; 20	MGY	RSD	DAY	BRI	RCH	ATL	HCY	GPS	CLB	NWS	MAR	AUG	AWS	DAR	BLV	LGY	CLT	ASH	MGR	SMR	BIR	CAR	GPS	DAY	ISP	OXF	FDA	TRN	BRI	SMR	NSV	ATL	CLB	BGS	AWS	SBO	LGY	DAR	HCY	RCH	BLV	HBO	MAR	NWS	AUG	CLT	CAR	JFC														104th	–	
1970	Petty Enterprises	43	Plymouth	RSD	DAY	DAY	DAY	RCH	CAR	SVH	ATL	BRI	TAL	NWS	CLB	DAR	BLV	LGY	CLT; 20	SMR	MAR	MCH	RSD	HCY	KPT	GPS	DAY	AST	TPN	TRN	BRI	SMR	NSV	ATL	CLB	ONA	MCH	TAL	BGS	SBO	DAR	HCY	RCH	DOV	NCF	NWS	CLT	MAR	MGR	CAR	LGY															–	–	
1971	Bill Ellis	14	Chevy	RSD	DAY	DAY	DAY	ONT	RCH	CAR	HCY	BRI	ATL	CLB	GPS	SMR	NWS	MAR	DAR	SBO	TAL	ASH	KPT	CLT; 12	DOV	MCH	RSD	HOU	GPS	DAY	BRI	AST	ISP	TRN	NSV	ATL																														–	–	
1971	Cliff Stewart Racing	14	AMC																																		BGS; 3	ONA; 6	MCH	TAL	CLB; 3	HCY; 15	DAR	MAR	CLT	DOV	CAR	MGR; 24	RCH	NWS	TWS															–	–	

==== Winston Cup Series ====
NASCAR Winston Cup Series results
Year	Team	No.	Make	1	2	3	4	5	6	7	8	9	10	11	12	13	14	15	16	17	18	19	20	21	22	23	24	25	26	27	28	29	30	31	NWCC	Pts	Ref
1972	Howard & Egerton Racing	27	Chevy	RSD	DAY	RCH	ONT	CAR	ATL	BRI	DAR	NWS	MAR	TAL	CLT; 16	DOV	MCH	RSD	TWS	DAY	BRI	TRN	ATL	TAL	MCH	NSV	DAR	RCH	DOV	MAR	NWS	CLT	CAR	TWS	–	–	

===== Daytona 500 =====
Year	Team	Manufacturer	Start	Finish
1961	John Masoni	Pontiac	3	49
1962	Cliff Stewart Racing	Pontiac	28	14
1963	Petty Enterprises	Plymouth	34	36
1964	Owens Racing	Dodge	10	5
1966	Friedkin Enterprises	Plymouth	16	11
1967	Friedkin Enterprises	Plymouth	13	32

==== Convertible Division ====
NASCAR Convertible Division results
Year	Team	No.	Make	1	2	3	4	5	6	7	8	9	10	11	12	13	14	15	16	17	18	19	20	21	22	23	24	25	26	27	28	29	30	31	32	33	34	35	36	NCC	Pts	Ref
1957	Jim Paschal	17	Mercury	JAC	DAB	FAY	GBF	ODS	HBO	RCH	GPS	WIL	HCY	BGS	NOR	LAN	DAR	CLT	MCC	PIF	NYF	OBS	AWS	PCH	MCF	BGS	CON	PHI	CHI	CLB	RSP; 16	NOR; 6	MAR; 29	FAY	CLT					–	–	
1957	Holman-Moody	26	Ford																																	NWS; 18	NOR	WIL	CLB	–	–	
1958	Julian Petty	49A	Chevy	DAB	NWS	RCH	BGS	AWS	HCY	CLB	WIL	DAR	CLT	ATL	MAR	BIR	CLB	GPS; 9	MBS	CLT	WIL	SAS																		30th	780	
1959	Bob Welborn	48	Chevy	DAY	FAY	RCH	HCY	MRL	CLT	HBO	DAR	CLB	AWS	BGS	MAR	CLB; 9	GPS	CLT; 2																						47th	496	

==== Grand National East Series ====
NASCAR Grand National East Series results
Year	Team	No.	Make	1	2	3	4	5	6	7	8	9	10	11	12	13	14	15	NGNEC	Pts	Ref
1972	H. C. Stewart	14	Pontiac	JSP	HCY; 10	GPS; 18	CLB	NSV	SMR	**ONA**; 2	MBS; 29	AST	ISP						12th	672.75	
1972	H. C. Stewart	14	Chevy											CLB; 10	HCY; 21	BGS; 2	LPS; 19	CLB; 16	12th	672.75	

==== Pacific Coast Late Model Division ====
NASCAR Pacific Coast Late Model Division results
Year	Team	No.	Make	1	2	3	4	5	6	7	8	9	10	11	12	13	14	15	16	17	18	19	20	21	22	23	24	25	26	27	28	29	30	31	32	NPCC	Pts	Ref
1956	Frank Hayworth	75	Mercury	LAS	ASF	LAS	LAS	SMS	LAS	BMT	POR	LAS	EUR	MER	BST	HBS	POR	LAS	BST	CSF	BMT	COS	BKS	LAS	SAN	POR	BST	LAS	HUG	POR	LAS	SCF	LAS	WSS; 4	LAS	–	–	
