= 1966 Southeastern 500 =

Auto race held at Bristol International Speedway in 1966

Race details
- Race 7 of 49 in the 1966 NASCAR Grand National Series season
- Layout of Bristol Motor Speedway
- Date: March 20, 1966
- Official name: Southeastern 500
- Location: Bristol International Speedway, Bristol, Tennessee
- Course: Permanent racing facility
- Course length: 0.500 miles (0.800 km)
- Distance: 500 laps, 250.0 mi (400.0 km)
- Weather: Temperatures of 69 °F (21 °C); wind speeds of 14 miles per hour (23 km/h)
- Average speed: 69.952 miles per hour (112.577 km/h)
- Attendance: 25,000

Pole position
Driver	David Pearson	Owens Racing
- Time: 20.870

Most laps led
Driver	David Pearson	Owens Racing
- Laps: 330

Winner
No. 29	Dick Hutcherson	Holman-Moody

Television in the United States
- Network: untelevised
- Announcers: none

The 1966 Southeastern 500 was a NASCAR Grand National Series event that was held on March 20, 1966, at Bristol International Speedway in the Bristol, Tennessee.

The transition to purpose-built racecars began in the early 1960s and occurred gradually over that decade. Changes made to the sport by the late 1960s brought an end to the "strictly stock" vehicles of the 1950s.

== Race report ==
Five hundred laps were done on a paved oval track spanning 0.500 miles (0.805 km). The total time of the race was three hours, twenty-four minutes, and twenty-six seconds. There were seven cautions for 92 laps. Speeds were: 69.952 miles per hour or 112.577 kilometres per hour and 86.248 miles per hour or 138.803 kilometres per hour for the pole position speed (accomplished by David Pearson). Dick Hutcherson defeated Paul Lewis by outlapping him more than four times; resulting in Ford's 200th win. The Ray Nichels team had also used the #9 for Larry Frank's entry at Daytona earlier in the season. They also had Don White run multiple car numbers in the 1966 season, so they weren't always consistent with them.

Richard Petty had an injured finger and could not participate in this race; Jim Paschal had to take over as the relief driver.

Twenty-five thousand fans saw thirty-two drivers start a race that only seven would complete. Attrition levels were worse in this Bristol race than it is in the 2010 NASCAR Cup Series season; a rare instance where lower speeds on a track are more dangerous than faster speeds. By contrast, the 2010 Food City 500 would see an average speed of 79.618 miles per hour or 128.133 kilometres per hour and a pole position speed of 124.63 miles per hour or 200.57 kilometres per hour with only eight drivers not being able to complete the race.

The total winnings for the race were $21,735 in American dollars ($215,678 when inflation is taken into effect). Notable crew chiefs for this race were Bud Hartje, Frankie Scott, Jake Elder, Jack Sullivan and Herman Beam.

=== Qualifying ===
Grid	No.	Driver	Manufacturer	Qualifying time	Speed	Owner
1	6	David Pearson	'66 Dodge	20.870	86.248	Cotton Owens
2	28	Fred Lorenzen	'66 Ford	21.050	85.510	Holman-Moody
3	9	Paul Goldsmith	'65 Plymouth	21.060	85.470	Ray Nichels
4	43	Jim Paschal	'65 Plymouth	21.090	85.348	Petty Enterprises
5	21	Marvin Panch	'66 Ford	21.190	84.945	Wood Brothers
6	29	Dick Hutcherson	'66 Ford	21.260	84.666	Holman-Moody
7	98	Sam McQuagg	'66 Dodge	21.320	84.427	Ray Nichels
8	27	Cale Yarborough	'66 Ford	21.440	83.955	Banjo Matthews
9	49	G.C. Spencer	'65 Plymouth	21.520	83.643	G.C. Spencer
10	19	J.T. Putney	'66 Chevrolet	21.750	82.758	J.T. Putney

== Finishing order ==
Section reference:

1. Dick Hutcherson† (No. 29)
2. Paul Lewis (No. 1)
3. James Hylton (No. 48)
4. Elmo Langley† (No. 64)
5. Sam McQuagg† (No. 98)
6. Gene Black† (No. 74)
7. Bill Seifert (No. 45)
8. Wendell Scott*† (No. 34)
9. Henley Gray* (No. 97)
10. G.C. Spencer*† (No. 49)
11. Clyde Lynn*† (No. 20)
12. Gene Cline* (No. 95)
13. Johnny Allen* (No. 0)
14. Larry Manning*† (No. 63)
15. David Pearson*† (No. 6)
16. Walter Wallace* (No. 73)
17. J. D. McDuffie*† (No. 70)
18. Marvin Panch* (No. 21)
19. Ned Jarrett* (No. 11)
20. Jim Paschal*† (No. 43)
21. Paul Goldsmith* (No. 9)
22. Fred Lorenzen* (No. 28)
23. Bobby Isaac*† (No. 26)
24. Cale Yarborough* (No. 27)
25. Johnny Steele* (No. 2)
26. J.T. Putney*† (No. 19)
27. Buddy Arrington* (No. 67)
28. Bobby Allison* (No. 24)
29. Wayne Smith* (No. 38)
30. John Sears*† (No. 04)
31. Sonny Lamphear* (No. 96)
32. E.J. Trivette* (No. 52)

† signifies that the driver is known to be deceased
* Driver failed to finish race

== Timeline ==
Section reference:

David Pearson
David Pearson
Marvin Panch
David Pearson
Dick Hutcherson
Dick Hutcherson
│
1
│
21
│
41
│
61
│
81
│
101
│
121
│
141
│
161
│
181
│
201
│
221
│
241
│
261
│
281
│
301
│
321
│
341
│
361
│
381
│
401
│
421
│
441
│
461
│
481

Preceded by 1966 Peach Blossom 500	NASCAR Grand National Season; 1966	Succeeded by 1966 Atlanta 500
