= Cale Yarborough =

American racing driver (1939–2023)

- Yarborough c. 1969
- Born: March 27, 1939; Timmonsville, South Carolina, U.S.
- Died: December 31, 2023 (aged 84); Florence, South Carolina, U.S.
- Achievements: 1976, 1977, 1978 NASCAR Winston Cup Series Champion; 1984 IROC Champion; 1968, 1977, 1983, 1984 Daytona 500 Winner; 1968, 1973, 1974, 1978, 1982 Southern 500 Winner; 1978, 1984 Winston 500 Winner; 1985 Talladega 500 Winner; Holds Winston Cup Series modern era record for most poles in a season (14 poles in 1980)
- Awards: 1967 NASCAR Grand National Series Most Popular Driver; International Motorsports Hall of Fame (1993); National Motorsports Press Association Hall of Fame (1994); Motorsports Hall of Fame of America (1994); Court of Legends at Charlotte Motor Speedway (1996); 3× National Motorsports Press Association Driver of the Year (1977, 1978, 1979); 1977 American Driver of the Year; South Carolina Athletic Hall of Fame (1978); Talladega Walk of Fame (1996); Named one of NASCAR's 50 Greatest Drivers (1998); NASCAR Hall of Fame (2012); Named one of NASCAR's 75 Greatest Drivers (2023)

NASCAR Cup Series career
- 560 races run over 31 years
- Best finish: 1st (1976, 1977, 1978)
- First race: 1957 Southern 500 (Darlington)
- Last race: 1988 Atlanta Journal 500 (Atlanta)
- First win: 1965 untitled race (Valdosta)
- Last win: 1985 Miller High Life 500 (Charlotte)
Wins	Top tens	Poles
83	319	69

NASCAR Grand National East Series career
- 8 races run over 2 years
- Best finish: 13th (1973)
- First race: 1972 Sandlapper 200 (Columbia)
- Last race: 1973 Buddy Shuman 100 (Hickory)
Wins	Top tens	Poles
0	7	0
- Statistics up to date as of December 31, 2023.

William Caleb Yarborough (March 27, 1939 – December 31, 2023) was an American NASCAR Winston Cup Series driver and owner, businessman, farmer, and rancher. He was the first driver in NASCAR history to win three consecutive championships, winning in 1976, 1977, and 1978. (Note: Jimmie Johnson joined Yarborough when he won in 2006, 2007 & 2008 before exceeding Yarbrough with championships in 2009 and 2010) He was one of the preeminent stock car drivers from the 1960s to the 1980s and also competed in IndyCar events. His fame was such that a special model of the Mercury Cyclone Spoiler II was named after him.

His 83 wins tie him with Jimmie Johnson for sixth on the all-time NASCAR Cup Series winner's list (behind Bobby Allison, who has 85 and Darrell Waltrip, who has 84). His 14.82% winning percentage is the ninth best of all-time and third among those with 500 or more starts. Yarborough won the Daytona 500 four times; his first win coming in 1968 for the Wood Brothers, the second in 1977 for Junior Johnson, and back-to-back wins in 1983 and 1984 for Ranier–Lundy Racing. Yarborough was a three-time winner of the National Motorsports Press Association Driver of the Year Award (1977, 1978, 1979). After retiring, he owned Cale Yarborough Motorsports and several successful agricultural businesses as well as being a rancher and farmer himself on his own ranch at his home in Florence, South Carolina.

== Beginnings ==
Yarborough was born to Julian and Annie Yarborough in the tiny, unincorporated community of Sardis near Timmonsville, South Carolina, the oldest of three sons. Julian was a tobacco farmer, cotton gin operator, and store owner who was killed in a private airplane crash when Cale was twelve years of age. According to his autobiography Cale, Yarborough attended the second Southern 500 in 1951 as a young spectator without a ticket. Yarborough was a high school football star at Timmonsville High School and played semi-pro football in Columbia, South Carolina for four seasons and was a Golden Gloves boxer. He made his first attempt in the Southern 500 as a teenager by lying about his age, but he was caught and disqualified by NASCAR. In 1957, Yarborough made his debut as a driver at the Southern 500, driving the No. 30 Pontiac for Bob Weatherly, starting 44th and finishing 42nd after suffering hub problems. He ran for Weatherly two years later, and finished 27th. In 1960, Yarborough ran one race, and had his first career top-fifteen, a fourteenth-place finish at Southern States Fairgrounds. He again ran one race in 1961, finishing thirtieth in the Southern 500 driving for Julian Buesink. In 1962, Yarborough ran eight races for Buesink, Don Harrison, and Wildcat Williams. He earned his first top-ten at the Daytona 500 Qualifying Race, when he finished tenth.

== 1960s ==
Yarborough started 1963 without a full-time ride, but soon signed on to drive the No. 19 Ford for Herman Beam. His best finish was fifth twice, at Myrtle Beach and Savannah Speedway. He began the next season driving for Beam, but left and finished the year with Holman-Moody, finishing sixth at North Wilkesboro Speedway, winding up nineteenth in points. The next season, he drove for various owners before picking up his first career win at Valdosta Speedway driving the #06 Ford for Kenny Myler, rising to tenth in the final standings.

Yarborough drove for Banjo Matthews at the beginning of 1966. Despite two consecutive second-place finishes, he left the team early in the season and ended the year driving the No. 21 Ford for the Wood Brothers. He won two races in 1967 at the Atlanta 500 and the Firecracker 400 for the Wood Brothers, but dropped to twentieth in standings because he only ran seventeen races. Yarborough also ran the Indianapolis 500 in 1966 and 1967 driving Vollstedt-Fords. After running the season-opening Middle Georgia 500 for Bud Moore Engineering, finishing 21st, Yarborough ran the rest of the season for the Wood Brothers, winning his first Daytona 500 in a duel with LeeRoy Yarbrough, the Firecracker 400, which made him the second driver in history to sweep both Daytona events, and his first Southern 500 garnering a total of six wins that season. Running a limited schedule, he finished 17th in points. The next season, he won his third straight Atlanta 500 along with the first NASCAR race at Michigan International Speedway the Motor State 500 and six pole positions.

In 1969, the Ford Motor Company produced a Cale Yarborough Special Edition Mercury Cyclone Spoiler II (and they also produced a Mercury Cyclone Spoiler). It was a white Mercury Cyclone (fastback) in white with a red roof and stripe. The Spoiler II was outfitted with a special aerodynamic front end. This was a limited edition homologation special that was made to satisfy the NASCAR 500-car minimum production regulations. There was only one engine choice available in the Mercury Cyclone Spoiler II, a 351 cubic inch Windsor; a very similar car was also produced by Mercury in 1969 as a white car with blue trim as the Dan Gurney Special.

== 1970s ==
Yarborough continued to drive a limited schedule for the Wood Brothers in 1970, winning his second consecutive Michigan 400 and the American 500 for the first time along with one of the Daytona 125-mile qualifying races and four poles. At the end of the season, Yarborough was released after Ford withdrew factory support for NASCAR teams. He drove four races in 1971, posting one top-ten in Daytona in the No. 3 Ray Fox-owned Plymouth. He also ran in the Indianapolis 500, finishing sixteenth in a Gene White-owned, Firestone-sponsored Mongoose-Ford. The next season, Yarborough ran five NASCAR races, his best finish coming at Michigan driving for James Hylton. He ended the season with two consecutive Top 10's driving for Hoss Ellington. He also ran his final Indianapolis 500 in a Bill Daniels sponsored Atlanta-Foyt, finishing tenth. Yarborough mostly focused on driving USAC races in 1971 and 1972. In 1973, Yarborough returned to NASCAR and ran every NASCAR Grand National race in a season for the first time in his career, driving the No. 11 Kar-Kare Chevrolet for Richard Howard. He won four races, including his second Southern 500, the National 500 and the Southeastern 500 at Bristol in which he led every lap, and had nineteen top-tens, finishing second in points.

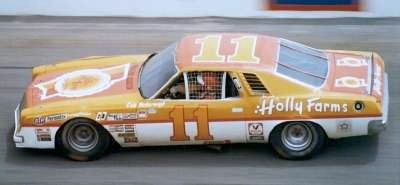
Cale Yarborough's No. 11 Chevelle Laguna

In 1974, Yarborough won a career-high ten races, but lost the championship by nearly 600 points. Midway through the season, Yarborough's team was bought by Junior Johnson with Carling Brewery sponsorship. Yarborough swept both races at Riverside International Raceway, captured his fourth Atlanta 500, and his second consecutive Southern 500 and third overall. Despite his successful 1974 campaign, the team began 1975 without major sponsorship, and missed three races, before Holly Farms became the team's primary sponsor. He won three races, including sweeping the events at Rockingham, but dropped to ninth in the final standings.

The next 3 years would be Cale Yarborough's time to shine. In 1976, he won nine races, including four in a row late in the season, along with winning the Firecracker 400, in winning his first career Winston Cup Championship. The 1977 season would be the greatest year in Cale Yarborough's legendary career. Not only that he would go on to repeat his nine-win performance from 1976, but he finished every single race, and did not finish outside of the Top 6 during the last 14 races of the season. In just a thirty-race schedule for 1977, he scored a total of 5000 points under the Winston Cup points system, earning him his second consecutive championship. He won the title by 386 points over Richard Petty. Yarborough became the first driver in NASCAR history to win the championship and NOT score a single DNF. Bobby Labonte would join Cale and become only the second driver to do the same thing in 2000. As of 2022, they are the only two drivers in history to do so. Yarborough led the Winston Cup points standings throughout the entire 1977 season, making him the only driver in NASCAR history to accomplish that feat. However, there was a tie in points after the very first race of the season. David Pearson went on to win the race at Riverside. Yarborough finished second, and he received the bonus points for leading the most laps. Both drivers were scored at 180 points each after Riverside. Technically, back in the Winston Cup points system, the tiebreaker would go to the driver who has the most wins. NASCAR listed Pearson as the points leader because he scored the season's first win, but, he was also racing on a part-time schedule. They also listed Yarborough as the points leader because he was racing full-time and competing for the season's championship, and more importantly, defending his championship from 1976. The 1977 season became the only year in NASCAR history to list two drivers as the points leader. Another highlight of the season was his second Daytona 500 victory, earning him a cover appearance on Sports Illustrated, the second NASCAR driver so honored. He also scored two victories in IROC IV, finishing second in the standings. In 1978, his team switched to Oldsmobiles and received new sponsorship from First National City Travelers Checks. He matched his previous career high of 10 wins from 1974, including leading every lap of the Music City USA 420, his fourth Southern 500 and first Winston 500 at Talladega, and went on to win his third consecutive NASCAR Winston Cup championship (clinching it at the American 500). Cale Yarborough became the very first driver in NASCAR history to win three consecutive championships. He clinched the 1978 championship with two races to go, becoming the second driver to win the title that early in the Winston Cup points system. Richard Petty clinched the 1975 championship with four races to go. In IROC V he captured one victory, finishing fourth in the standings.

Yarborough began the 1979 season with Busch Beer sponsorship and getting into a fight with Donnie and Bobby Allison after the Daytona 500, when Donnie and Yarborough wrecked while racing for the lead on the final lap. This was the first NASCAR 500-mile race to be broadcast on live television in its entirety (through CBS Sports). The confrontation and the exciting race that led up to it are credited with starting the mass growth of NASCAR. Yarborough went on to finish fourth in the standings, winning four races, including the Coca-Cola 500 at Pocono Raceway and the National 500 at Charlotte Motor Speedway, one pole, and finishing third in the IROC VI standings.

== 1980s ==
Yarborough won a career-high and modern-era record fourteen poles in 1980, captured six races including sweeping the events at Rockingham, and scoring wins at Bristol, Michigan, Texas and Atlanta. Yarborough barely missed out on his fourth championship in five years, losing the championship to Dale Earnhardt by nineteen points. At the end of the season, Yarborough announced he was leaving the Junior Johnson team to spend more time with his family and would run a part-time schedule for the rest of his career. At the suggestion of Yarborough, he was replaced by Darrell Waltrip. Yarborough won 55 races while driving for Johnson from 1973 to 1980, compiling an amazing winning percentage of 26.57 percent.

Yarborough competed in eighteen races in the 1981 season in the No. 27 Valvoline-sponsored Buick for M.C. Anderson, winning his fourth Firecracker 400 and his fifth Coca-Cola 500 at Atlanta, finishing in the top-ten a total of ten times. Yarborough competed in sixteen races in 1982, winning three, including his hometown Southern 500 for the fifth and final time. He also ran the 1981 24 Hours of Le Mans finishing thirteen laps before a crash ended the team's efforts.

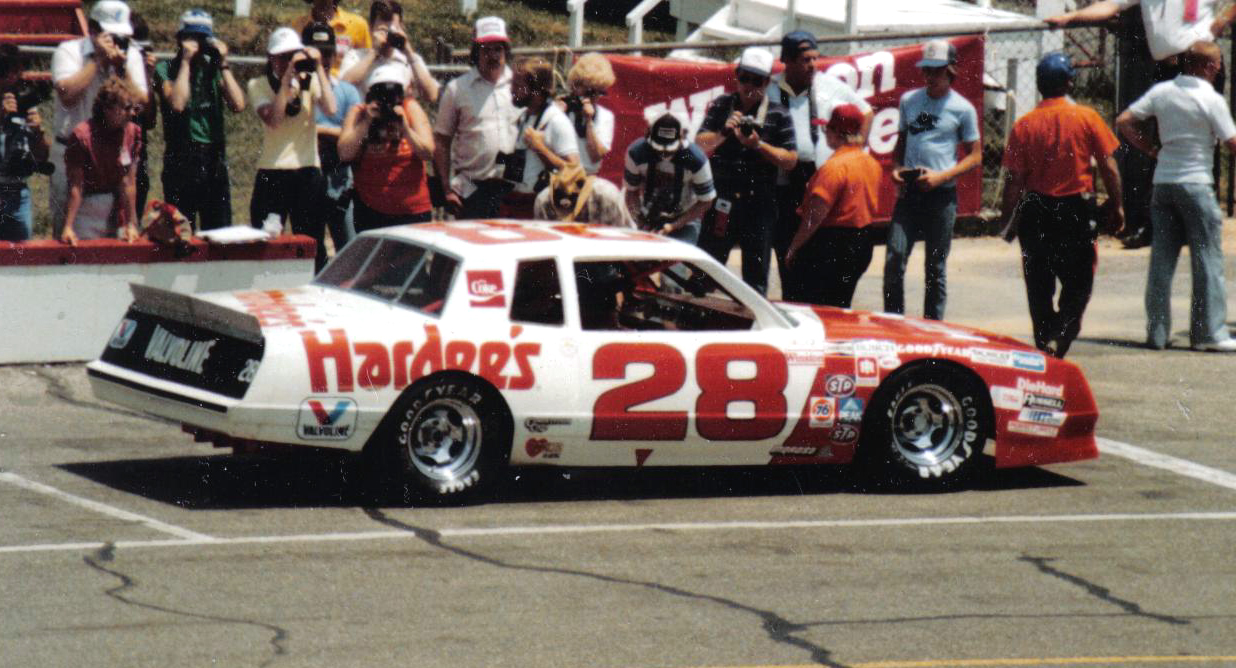
1983 racecar

In 1983, Anderson closed his operation, and Yarborough moved to the No. 28 Hardee's-sponsored Chevrolet owned by Ranier-Lundy, competing in sixteen events. He won four races, including his third Daytona 500, his sixth Atlanta Coca-Cola 500, and swept both events at Michigan, along with three poles. In 1984, he repeated by winning his fourth Daytona 500, becoming the second driver to score back-to-back wins, the Winston 500 at Talladega, a race that featured 75 lead changes, and the Van Scoy Diamond Mine 500, along with four poles. Yarborough also captured the IROC VIII championship. In 1985, after his team switched to a Ford, he won his first Talladega 500 and scored his final win in the Miller High Life 500 at Charlotte Motor Speedway. He also finished eighth in the final standings of IROC IX.

In 1986, Yarborough won his final career pole at the Firecracker 400, and had five top-ten finishes. He scored a victory at Talladega during IROC X and finished third in the standings. In 1987, he left the Ranier-Lundy team and purchased Jack Beebe's Race Hill Farm team. Yarborough took the Hardee's sponsorship and began running the No. 29 Oldsmobile Delta 88 as an owner/driver, posting two top-five finishes. He ran his final season in 1988 in an Oldsmobile Cutlass Supreme, entering ten races and posting two ninth-place finishes. He retired at the end of the year.

== Politics ==
In 1972, Yarborough became the first Republican elected to the Florence County Council since Reconstruction. During the 1976 United States presidential election, he campaigned for his longtime friend, Jimmy Carter. That year, Yarborough was reelected to the county council, this time as a Democrat.

== Ownership ==
In 1986, Yarborough purchased Jack Beebe's Race Hill Farm team, renaming the team Cale Yarborough Motorsports and running a part-time schedule in 1987 and 1988. During the 1988 season, Yarborough split time in the No. 29 car with Dale Jarrett, who took over full-time in 1989 following Yarborough's retirement.

For 1990, Jarrett was replaced by Dick Trickle in the renumbered No. 66 car, with backing from Phillips 66. The team won the pole at Dover, finishing 24th in points. Multiple drivers raced for Yarborough in 1991, including Trickle, Lake Speed, Dorsey Schroeder, Chuck Bown, and Randy LaJoie. Chad Little, Bobby Hillin Jr, and Jimmy Hensley would all drive the No. 66 in 1992, with Hensley winning Rookie of the Year honors.

In 1993, the team switched to the No. 98 with Bojangles' sponsorship and Derrike Cope behind the wheel, finishing 26th in points. Cope began 1994 with sponsorship from Fingerhut, but was replaced by Jeremy Mayfield after struggling.

RCA became the team's new primary sponsor in 1995, and Mayfield finished 31st in points despite missing four races. In 1996, Mayfield had two top-five finishes and won the pole at Talladega Superspeedway. Towards the end of the season, Mayfield left to drive for Michael Kranefuss, whose previous driver John Andretti moved to the 98, finishing fifth at Martinsville Speedway. Andretti won the team's second pole at Talladega in 1997, and at the 1997 Pepsi 400, he led 113 laps and won Yarborough's only race as a car owner.

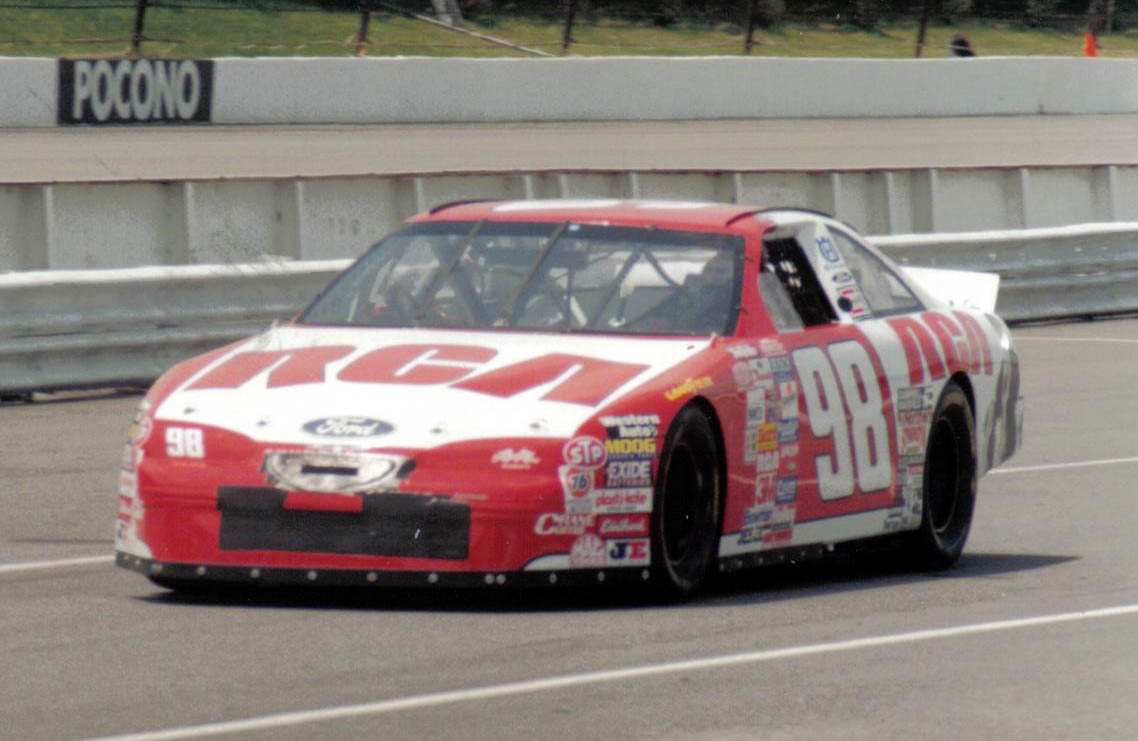
John Andretti driving the #98 Cale Yarborough Motorsports Ford in 1997

Despite the win and a 23rd-place points finish, RCA left the sport and Andretti signed with Petty Enterprises. Yarborough signed Greg Sacks to drive his Thorn Apple Valley Ford in 1998, but Sacks suffered a neck injury at Texas Motor Speedway and was unable to race for the rest of the year. Rich Bickle took his place, and had a fourth-place finish at Martinsville. After the season Bickle resigned to drive for Tyler Jet Motorsports and Thorn Apple departed due to financial problems within the organization.

Due to the lack of financing, Yarborough originally closed his team, but soon reopened and hired Rick Mast as the driver, with car dealer Wayne Burdett joining as a co-owner. Despite having no primary sponsor, Yarborough and his team ran the full schedule, picking up short-term deals with Sonic Drive-In and Hobas Pipe. Soon after, Burdette left the team and the team signed Universal Studios/Woody Woodpecker as its primary sponsor. Mast posted two top-tens and did not have a DNF all season, the second driver since Yarborough to accomplish that feat. Despite rumors of a second team with Mike Ciochetti driving, Mast and Universal both departed following the season. In January 2000, Yarborough closed the team until a buyer could be found.

He sold the team in the summer of 2000 to Chip MacPherson. Renamed MacPherson Motorsports, the team ran 2 races with drivers Jeff Fuller and Geoff Bodine. Both drivers failed to finish the race and finished 41st. Soon afterward, the team disappeared from the Cup circuit.

== Motorsports career results ==
=== NASCAR ===
(key) (Bold – Pole position awarded by qualifying time. Italics – Pole position earned by points standings or practice time. * – Most laps led.)

==== Grand National Series ====
NASCAR Grand National Series results
Year	Team	No.	Make	1	2	3	4	5	6	7	8	9	10	11	12	13	14	15	16	17	18	19	20	21	22	23	24	25	26	27	28	29	30	31	32	33	34	35	36	37	38	39	40	41	42	43	44	45	46	47	48	49	50	51	52	53	54	55	56	57	58	59	60	61	62	NGNC	Pts	Ref
1957	Bob Weatherly	30	Pontiac	WSS	CON	TIC	DAB	CON	WIL	HBO	AWS	NWS	LAN	CLT	PIF	GBF	POR	CCF	RCH	MAR	POR	EUR	LIN	LCS	ASP	NWP	CLB	CPS	PIF	JAC	RSP	CLT	MAS	POR	HCY	NOR	LCS	GLN	KPC	LIN	OBS	MYB	DAR; 42	NYF	AWS	CSF	SCF	LAN	CLB	CCF	CLT	MAR	NBR	CON	NWS	GBF										159th	-	
1959	Bob Weatherly	30	Ford	FAY	DAY	DAY	HBO	CON	ATL	WIL	BGS	CLB	NWS	REF	HCY	MAR	TRN	CLT	NSV	ASP	PIF	GPS	ATL	CLB	WIL	RCH	BGS	AWS	DAY	HEI	CLT	MBS	CLT	NSV	AWS	BGS	GPS	CLB	DAR; 27	HCY	RCH	CSF	HBO	MAR	AWS	NWS	CON																			110th	80	
1960	Bob Weatherly	30	Ford	CLT	CLB	DAY	DAY	DAY	CLT; 14	NWS	PHO	CLB	MAR	HCY	WIL	BGS	GPS	AWS	DAR	PIF	HBO	RCH	HMS	CLT	BGS	DAY	HEI	MAB	MBS	ATL	BIR	NSV	AWS	PIF	CLB	SBO	BGS	DAR	HCY	CSF	GSP	HBO	MAR	NWS	CLT	RCH	ATL																			132nd	104	
1961	Julian Buesink	52	Ford	CLT	JSP	DAY	DAY	DAY	PIF	AWS	HMS	ATL	GPS	HBO	BGS	MAR	NWS	CLB	HCY	RCH	MAR	DAR	CLT	CLT	RSD	ASP	CLT	PIF	BIR	GPS	BGS	NOR	HAS	STR	DAY	ATL	CLB	MBS	BRI	NSV	BGS	AWS	RCH	SBO	DAR; 30	HCY	RCH	CSF	ATL	MAR	NWS	CLT	BRI	GPS	HBO											NA	0	
1962	Julian Buesink	52	Ford	CON	AWS	DAY	DAY; 10	DAY; 48	CON	AWS	SVH	HBO	RCH	CLB	NWS	GPS	MBS	MAR	BGS	BRI	RCH	HCY	CON	DAR; 13	PIF	CLT																																								50th	1884	
1962	Julian Buesink	92	Ford																								ATL; 40	BGS	AUG	RCH	SBO	DAY	CLB	ASH	GPS	AUG	SVH	MBS	BRI	CHT	NSV	HUN	AWS	STR	BGS	PIF	VAL																			50th	1884	
1962	Don Harrison	92	Ford																																													DAR; 38	HCY	RCH	DTS	AUG; 13	MAR	NWS		ATL; 33										50th	1884	
1962	Wildcat Williams	9	Ford																																																				CLT; 25											50th	1884	
1963	Julian Buesink	52	Ford	BIR	GGS	THS	RSD	DAY	DAY; 20	DAY; DNQ	PIF	AWS	HBO	ATL	HCY	BRI	AUG	RCH	GPS	SBO	BGS	MAR	NWS	CLB	THS	DAR; 11	ODS	RCH																																						25th	8062	
1963	Toy Bolton	18	Pontiac																										CLT; 23	BIR	ATL																																			25th	8062	
1963	Lewis Osborne	97	Chevy																													DAY; 34																																		25th	8062	
1963	Herman Beam	19	Ford																														MBS; 5	SVH; 5	DTS	BGS	ASH	OBS	BRR	BRI; 14	GPS; 15	NSV; 8	CLB; 8	AWS; 14	PIF; 5	BGS	ONA	DAR; 17	HCY; 10	RCH; 11	MAR; 12	DTS; 6	NWS	THS	CLT; 12	SBO	HBO	RSD								25th	8062	
1964	Herman Beam	19	Ford	CON	AUG; 15	JSP	SVH	RSD	DAY	DAY; 11	DAY; 17	RCH; 16	BRI; 12	GPS	BGS		AWS; 18	HBO	PIF	CLB; 23	NWS; 23	MAR; 7	SVH; 5	DAR; 19	LGY	HCY	SBO	CLT; 28	GPS; 9	ASH; 5	ATL	CON; 14	NSV	CHT; 19	BIR; 6	VAL; 22	PIF; 7	DAY	ODS	OBS	BRR	ISP	GLN	LIN	BRI	NSV	MBS																			19th	12618	
1964	Ray Osborne	92	Ford													ATL; 24																																																		19th	12618	
1964	Holman-Moody	00	Ford																																													AWS; 20	DTS	ONA	CLB	BGS	STR						MAR; 10	SVH	NWS; 6	CLT; 19	HAR	AUG	JAC	19th	12618	
1964	Holman-Moody	06	Ford																																																			DAR; 8	HCY	RCH	ODS									19th	12618	
1964	Tom Spell	31	Ford																																																							HBO; 22								19th	12618	
1965	Gary Weaver	10	Ford	RSD	DAY	DAY; 21	DAY; 9		ASW; 3	RCH; 15								DAR; 24	LGY																																															10th	20192	
1965	Gary Weaver	10	Pontiac					PIF; 13																																																										10th	20192	
1965	Tom Spell	08	Ford								HBO; 21																																																							10th	20192	
1965	Lester Hunter	35	Dodge									ATL; 19																																																						10th	20192	
1965	Sam Fogle	31	Ford										GPS; 22	NWS; 27	MAR; 18	CLB; 10	BRI; 17			BGS; 8	HCY; 7				HAR; 21	NSV; 9	BIR; 6							OBS; 20																																10th	20192	
1965	Matthews Racing	7	Ford																			CLT; 22																																												10th	20192	
1965	Herman Beam	78	Ford																				CCF; 20	ASH																																										10th	20192	
1965	Kenny Myler	06	Ford																									ATL; 13	GPS; 15	MBS; 4	VAL; 1		ODS; 4		ISP; 4	GLN; 4				AWS; 5	SMR	PIF; 2	AUG; 6	CLB; 5	DTS; 16	BLV; 11	BGS; 5			LIN; 7	ODS; 17					HBO; 4										10th	20192	
1965	Matthews Racing	27	Ford																													DAY; 17*					BRI; 22	NSV	CCF									DAR; 30	HCY				MAR; 24	NWS; 2	CLT; 34		CAR; 2	DTS								10th	20192	
1965	Kenny Myler	96	Ford																																																	RCH; 37														10th	20192	
1966	Kenny Myler	06	Ford	AUG; 9																																																														18th	15188	
1966	Matthews Racing	27	Ford		RSD; 26	DAY; 10	DAY	DAY; 2	CAR; 2*	BRI; 24	ATL; 6																																																							18th	15188	
1966	Seifert Racing	45	Ford									HCY; 19	CLB	GPS																																																				18th	15188	
1966	Reid Shaw	0	Ford												BGS; 6	NWS	MAR	DAR	LGY	MGR	MON	RCH	CLT	DTS	ASH	PIF	SMR	AWS	BLV	GPS	DAY	ODS	BRR	OXF	FON	ISP	BRI	SMR	NSV	ATL	CLB	AWS	BLV	BGS																						18th	15188	
1966	Wood Brothers Racing	21	Ford																																										DAR; 11	HCY	RCH	HBO	MAR; 12	NWS; 19	CLT; 26	CAR; 4														18th	15188	
1967	Wood Brothers Racing	21	Ford	AUG	RSD; 45	DAY	DAY; 3	DAY; 39	AWS	BRI; 2	GPS	BGS	**ATL**; 1*	CLB	HCY	NWS; 2	MAR; 2*	SVH	RCH	DAR	BLV	LGY	**CLT**; 41	ASH	MGR	SMR	BIR	CAR; 4	GPS	MGY	DAY; 1	TRN	OXF	FDA	ISP	BRI; 33	SMR	NSV	ATL; 29	BGS	CLB	SVH	DAR; 44	HCY	RCH	BLV	HBO	**MAR**; 28		**CLT**; 10	CAR; 16															20th	16228	
1967	Neil Castles	06	Dodge																																														NWS; 7																	20th	16228	
1967	Bud Moore Engineering	16	Mercury																																																	AWS; 12														20th	16228	
1968	Bud Moore Engineering	16	Mercury	MGR; 21	MGY																																																													17th	1804	
1968	Wood Brothers Racing	21	Ford			RSD; 5		BRI; 24	RCH																																		HCY; 16																							17th	1804	
1968	Wood Brothers Racing	21	Mercury				**DAY**; 1*			ATL; 1*	HCY	GPS	CLB	NWS	MAR; 1	AUG	AWS	DAR; 20	BLV	LGY	CLT; 44	ASH	MGR	SMR	BIR	CAR; 32	GPS	DAY; 1*	ISP	OXF	FDA	TRN	BRI; 2	SMR	NSV	ATL; 18	CLB	BGS	AWS	SBO	LGY	DAR; 1*		RCH; 3	**BLV**; 18	HBO	**MAR**; 2	NWS; 5	AUG	CLT; 5	**CAR**; 26	JFC; 1														17th	1804	
1969	Wood Brothers Racing	21	Mercury	MGR	MGY	RSD; 24							ATL; 1*	CLB	HCY	GPS	RCH	NWS	MAR; 25	AWS	**DAR**; 2	BLV	LGY	CLT; 23	MGR	SMR	MCH; 1	KPT	GPS	NCF	**DAY**; 37	DOV	TPN	TRN	BLV	**BRI**; 24	NSV	SMR	**ATL**; 7	MCH; 4	SBO	BGS	AWS	**DAR**; 29	HCY	RCH	TAL; DNQ	CLB	MAR; 17	NWS	**CLT**; 25	SVH	AUG	CAR; 29	JFC	MGR	TWS; 25									23rd	1715	
1969	Wood Brothers Racing	21	Ford				DAY; 2*	DAY	DAY; 38	CAR; 3	AUG	BRI; 4																																																						23rd	1715	
1970	Wood Brothers Racing	21	Mercury	RSD	DAY; 1*	DAY	**DAY**; 37	RCH	CAR; 2	SVH	**ATL**; 2*	BRI; 3	TAL; 5	NWS	CLB				CLT; 2	SMR	MAR; 3	MCH; 1	RSD	HCY	KPT	GPS	**DAY**; 35	AST	TPN	TRN	**BRI**; 17	SMR	NSV	ATL; 2	CLB	ONA	MCH; 10	TAL; 6	BGS	SBO	DAR; 20	HCY	RCH	DOV	NCF	NWS	CLT; 40	MAR; 3	MGR	CAR; 1*	LGY															34th	1016	
1970	Matthews Racing	27	Ford													DAR; 13	BLV	LGY																																																34th	1016	
1971	Fox Racing	3	Plymouth	RSD	DAY; 7	DAY	DAY; 33	ONT	RCH	CAR	HCY	BRI	ATL; 29	CLB	GPS	SMR	NWS	MAR	DAR	SBO	TAL	ASH	KPT	CLT	DOV	MCH	RSD	HOU	GPS	DAY	BRI	AST	ISP	TRN	NSV	ATL	BGS	ONA	MCH	TAL	CLB	HCY	DAR	MAR																						NA	0	
1971	James Mason	87	Mercury																																										CLT; 28	DOV	CAR	MGR	RCH	NWS	TWS															NA	0	

==== Winston Cup Series ====
NASCAR Winston Cup Series results
Year	Team	No.	Make	1	2	3	4	5	6	7	8	9	10	11	12	13	14	15	16	17	18	19	20	21	22	23	24	25	26	27	28	29	30	31	NWCC	Pts	Ref
1972	Fox Racing	3	Plymouth	RSD	DAY; 6	RCH	ONT	CAR	ATL	BRI	DAR	NWS	MAR	TAL	CLT	DOV	MCH	RSD	TWS	DAY	BRI	TRN	ATL	TAL											51st	949.5	
1972	Hylton Motorsports	98	Mercury																						MCH; 5	NSV	DAR	RCH	DOV	MAR	NWS				51st	949.5	
1972	Ellington Racing	28	Chevy																													CLT; 39	CAR; 6	TWS; 9	51st	949.5	
1973	Howard & Egerton Racing	11	Chevy	RSD; 24	DAY; 22	RCH; 3	CAR; 2	**BRI**; 1**	ATL; 5	NWS; 6	DAR; 19	MAR; 2*	TAL; 41	**NSV**; 1*	CLT; 3	DOV; 2	TWS; 4	RSD; 24	MCH; 6	DAY; 36	**BRI**; 19	ATL; 2	TAL; 6	**NSV**; 14*	DAR; 1*	RCH; 2	DOV; 25	NWS; 3	**MAR**; 2*	CLT; 1*	CAR; 3				2nd	7106.65	
1974	Howard & Egerton Racing	11	Chevy	RSD; 1*	DAY; 2	RCH; 3	**CAR**; 2	BRI; 1*	ATL; 1	DAR; 5	NWS; 2	**MAR**; 1*	TAL; 9	NSV; 14*	DOV; 1*	CLT; 11	RSD; 1*	MCH; 27																	2nd	4470.3	
1974	Junior Johnson & Associates	11	Chevy																DAY; 3	BRI; 1*	NSV; 1	**ATL**; 14	POC; 3	TAL; 4	MCH; 3	DAR; 1*	RCH; 21	DOV; 28	NWS; 1*	MAR; 11*	CLT; 23	CAR; 2*	ONT; 3		2nd	4470.3	
1975	Junior Johnson & Associates	11	Chevy	RSD	DAY; 3	RCH	CAR; 1*	BRI; 20	ATL; 22	NWS; 2	DAR; 36	MAR; 3	TAL; 40	NSV; 14*	DOV; 27	CLT; 2	RSD	**MCH**; 4	DAY; 26	NSV; 1*	POC; 35	TAL; 41	MCH; 3	DAR; 19	DOV; 4	NWS; 2	**MAR**; 19*	CLT; 19	RCH; 26	CAR; 1*	**BRI**; 20	ATL; 5	ONT; 4		9th	3295	
1976	Junior Johnson & Associates	11	Chevy	RSD; 2	DAY; 42	CAR; 3	RCH; 4	BRI; 1*	ATL; 3*	NWS; 1*	DAR; 25	MAR; 2	TAL; 2	NSV; 1*	DOV; 27*	CLT; 3	RSD; 7*	MCH; 2*	DAY; 1*	NSV; 5	**POC**; 25	TAL; 26	MCH; 2*	BRI; 1*	DAR; 23	RCH; 1*	**DOV**; 1*	MAR; 1*	NWS; 1*	CLT; 2	CAR; 5	ATL; 4	ONT; 23		1st	4644	
1977	Junior Johnson & Associates	11	Chevy	**RSD**; 2*	DAY; 1*	RCH; 1*	CAR; 6	ATL; 3*	NWS; 1*	DAR; 16	**BRI**; 1*	MAR; 1*	TAL; 2	NSV; 2*	DOV; 1	CLT; 24	RSD; 3	MCH; 1*	DAY; 23	NSV; 4	POC; 6	TAL; 2	MCH; 5*	**BRI**; 1*	DAR; 5	RCH; 4	DOV; 3	MAR; 1*	NWS; 2	CLT; 2	CAR; 4	ATL; 5	ONT; 3		1st	5000	
1978	Junior Johnson & Associates	11	Olds	RSD; 1*	**DAY**; 2	RCH; 3	CAR; 18	**ATL**; 4	BRI; 4	DAR; 15*	NWS; 26	MAR; 16	**TAL**; 1*	DOV; 2	CLT; 4	NSV; 1**	RSD; 5*	MCH; 1	**DAY**; 2	NSV; 1*	POC; 26	**TAL**; 4*	MCH; 2*	BRI; 1*	DAR; 1*	RCH; 4	DOV; 2	MAR; 1*	NWS; 1	CLT; 22	**CAR**; 1*	**ATL**; 8	**ONT**; 2		1st	4841	
1979	Junior Johnson & Associates	11	Olds	RSD; 3	DAY; 5	CAR; 18	RCH; 1	ATL; 4	NWS; 9	BRI; 24	DAR; 6	MAR; 11	TAL; 33	NSV; 1		CLT; 4			MCH; 3	DAY; 20			TAL; 24				RCH; 5		MAR; 8		NWS; 20		ATL; 3*	**ONT**; 3	4th	4604	
1979	Junior Johnson & Associates	11	Chevy												DOV; 2*		TWS; 4	RSD; 4*			NSV; 2	POC; 1		MCH; 17	BRI; 5	DAR; 19		DOV; 3*		CLT; 1		CAR; 3			4th	4604	
1980	Junior Johnson & Associates	11	Chevy	RSD; 23		RCH; 25		ATL; 8*	**BRI**; 5	DAR; 12	NWS; 4	MAR; 4		**NSV**; 3*	**DOV**; 16*	**CLT**; 17	**TWS**; 1*	**RSD**; 4	MCH; 2		**NSV**; 2*	**POC**; 3		MCH; 1	**BRI**; 1*	DAR; 29		**DOV**; 4	**NWS**; 10		CLT; 2	CAR; 1*	ATL; 1*	**ONT**; 3	2nd	4642	
1980	Junior Johnson & Associates	11	Olds		DAY; 19		CAR; 1*						TAL; 6							**DAY**; 40			TAL; 2				**RCH**; 26			MAR; 3					2nd	4642	
1981	M.C. Anderson Racing	27	Olds	RSD	DAY; 8	RCH																													24th	2201	
1981	M.C. Anderson Racing	27	Buick				**CAR**; 2*	ATL; 1	BRI	NWS	DAR; 26	MAR; 21	TAL; 24	NSV	DOV; 10	CLT; 3	TWS	RSD	MCH; 8	**DAY**; 1*	NSV	POC; 5	TAL; 28	MCH; 17	BRI	DAR; 10	RCH	DOV; 13	MAR	NWS	CLT; 31	CAR; 25	ATL; 3	RSD	24th	2201	
1982	M.C. Anderson Racing	27	Buick	DAY; 2	RCH	BRI	ATL; 3	CAR; 1	DAR; 2	NWS	MAR	TAL; 37	NSV	DOV	CLT; 4	POC; 28	RSD	MCH; 1*	DAY; 22	NSV	**POC**; 26	TAL; 4	MCH; 28	BRI	DAR; 1*	RCH	DOV	NWS	CLT; 33	MAR	**CAR**; 25	ATL; 35	RSD		27th	2022	
1983	Ranier-Lundy Racing	28	Pontiac	DAY; 1	RCH																														28th	1960	
1983	Ranier-Lundy Racing	28	Chevy			CAR; 9*	ATL; 1	DAR; 6	NWS	MAR	**TAL**; 29	NSV	DOV; 22	BRI	CLT; 28	RSD	POC; 27	MCH; 1	**DAY**; 40	NSV	POC	**TAL**; 24	MCH; 1*	BRI	DAR; 7	RCH	DOV	MAR	NWS	CLT; 10	CAR; 36	ATL; 23	RSD		28th	1960	
1984	Ranier-Lundy Racing	28	Chevy	**DAY**; 1*	RCH; 14	CAR	ATL; 3	BRI	NWS	DAR; 4	MAR	**TAL**; 1	NSV	DOV	CLT; 21	RSD	POC; 1*	MCH; 13*	**DAY**; 3*	NSV	POC; 2	**TAL**; 5	MCH; 5	BRI	DAR; 17	RCH; 14	DOV	MAR	CLT; 3	NWS	CAR	ATL; 11	RSD		22nd	2448	
1985	Ranier-Lundy Racing	28	Ford	DAY; 36	RCH	CAR; 7	ATL; 22	BRI	DAR; 30	NWS	MAR	TAL; 3*	DOV	CLT; 40	RSD	POC; 24	MCH; 3	DAY; 36	POC; 31	TAL; 1	MCH; 32	BRI	DAR; 2	RCH	DOV	MAR	NWS	CLT; 1	CAR; 28*	ATL; 2	RSD				26th	1861	
1986	Ranier-Lundy Racing	28	Ford	DAY; 27	RCH	CAR; 6	ATL; 27	BRI	DAR; 22	NWS	MAR	TAL; 37	DOV	CLT; 3*	RSD	POC; 3	MCH; 30	**DAY**; 17	POC; 25	TAL; 24	GLN	MCH; 7	BRI	DAR; 10	RCH	DOV	MAR	NWS	CLT; 36	CAR; 33	ATL; 34	RSD			29th	1642	
1987	Cale Yarborough Motorsports	29	Olds	DAY; 10	CAR; 28	RCH	ATL; 8	DAR; 15	NWS	BRI	MAR	TAL; 37	CLT; 42	DOV	POC; 4	RSD	MCH; 33	DAY; 24	POC	TAL; 5	GLN	MCH; 40	BRI	DAR; 13	RCH	DOV; 36	MAR	NWS	CLT; 24	CAR; 37	RSD	ATL; 40			29th	1450	
1988	Cale Yarborough Motorsports	29	Olds	DAY; 38	RCH	CAR	ATL; 32	DAR	BRI	NWS	MAR	TAL; 18	CLT; 38	DOV	RSD	POC	MCH; 9	DAY; 41	POC	TAL; 9	GLN	MCH; 18	BRI	DAR	RCH	DOV	MAR	CLT; 22	NWS	CAR	PHO	ATL; 10			38th	940	

===== Daytona 500 =====
Year	Team	Manufacturer	Start	Finish
1962	Julian Buesink	Ford	21	48
1963	Julian Buesink	Ford	DNQ	
1964	Herman Beam	Ford	22	17
1965	Gary Weaver	Ford	32	9
1966	Matthews Racing	Ford	19	2
1967	Wood Brothers Racing	Ford	8	39
1968	Wood Brothers Racing	Mercury	**1**	**1**
1969	Wood Brothers Racing	Ford	5	38
1970	Wood Brothers Racing	Mercury	**1**	37
1971	Fox Racing	Plymouth	13	33
1972	Fox Racing	Plymouth	16	6
1973	Howard & Egerton Racing	Chevrolet	3	22
1974	Howard & Egerton Racing	Chevrolet	4	2
1975	Junior Johnson & Associates	Chevrolet	6	3
1976	Junior Johnson & Associates	Chevrolet	14	42
1977	Junior Johnson & Associates	Chevrolet	4	**1**
1978	Junior Johnson & Associates	Oldsmobile	**1**	2
1979	Junior Johnson & Associates	Oldsmobile	3	5
1980	Junior Johnson & Associates	Oldsmobile	5	19
1981	M.C. Anderson Racing	Oldsmobile	29	8
1982	M.C. Anderson Racing	Buick	3	2
1983	Ranier-Lundy Racing	Pontiac	8	**1**
1984	Ranier-Lundy Racing	Chevrolet	**1**	**1**
1985	Ranier-Lundy Racing	Ford	2	36
1986	Ranier-Lundy Racing	Ford	13	27
1987	Cale Yarborough Motorsports	Oldsmobile	22	10
1988	Cale Yarborough Motorsports	Oldsmobile	32	38

==== Winston West Series ====
NASCAR Winston West Series results
Year	Team	No.	Make	1	2	3	4	5	6	7	8	9	10	11	12	13	14	15	16	17	18	19	20	NWWSC	Pts	Ref
1977	Jim Stacy Racing	6	Dodge	RSD	LAG	ONT	SJS	MMR	ASP	RSD	SGS	YAK	EVG	WSP	USP	POR	AAS	CRS	ASP	SHA	POR	ONT	PHO; 1	50th	138	

=== International Race of Champions ===
(key) (Bold – Pole position. * – Most laps led.)

International Race of Champions results
Year	Make	Q1	Q2	Q3	1	2	3	4	Pos.	Pts	Ref
1974–75	Chevy				MCH; 2	RSD; 8	RSD; 9	DAY; 3	3rd	NA	
1976–77	Chevy				MCH; 9	RSD; 9	RSD; 1*	DAY; 1	2nd	NA	
1977–78	Chevy				MCH; 2	RSD; 10	RSD; 1	DAY; 4	4th	NA	
1978–79	Chevy	MCH; 2	MCH	RSD	RSD; 2	ATL; 4			3rd	NA	
1979–80	Chevy	MCH; 5	MCH	RSD	RSD	ATL			NA	0	
1984	Chevy				MCH; 12	**CLE**; 1	TAL; 2	MCH; 2*	1st	58	
1985	Chevy				DAY; 6	MOH; 12	TAL; C	MCH; 3	8th	29	
1986	Chevy				DAY; 2	MOH; 10	TAL; 1*	**GLN**; 6	3rd	57	

=== American open-wheel racing ===
(key) (Races in bold indicate pole position)

==== USAC Championship Car ====
USAC Championship Car results
Year	Team	Chassis	Engine	1	2	3	4	5	6	7	8	9	10	11	12	13	14	15	16	17	18	19	20	21	Pos.	Pts
1966	Jim Robbins	Vollstedt 65	Ford 255 ci V8	PHX	TRE	INDY; 28	MIL	LAN	ATL	PPR	IRP; DNS	LAN	ISF	MIL	DSF	INF	TRE	SAC	PHX						NC	0
1967	Vollstedt Enterprises	Vollstedt 67	Ford 255 ci V8	PHX	TRE	INDY; 17	MIL	LAN	PPR	MOS	MOS	IRP	LAN	MTR	MTR	ISF	MIL	DSF	INF	TRE	SAC	HAN	PHX	RSD	NC	0
1971	Gene White Co	Mongoose 71	Ford 159ci V8t	RAF; 8	RAF; 8	PHX; 13	TRE; 5	INDY; 16	MIL; DNQ	POC; 32	MCH; 5	MIL; 8	ONT; 14	TRE; 11	PHX; DNQ										16th	710
1972	Gene White Co	Atlanta 72	Ford 159ci V8t	PHX	TRE	INDY; 10	MIL	MCH	POC	MIL	ONT	TRE	PHX												28th	150

===== Indianapolis 500 =====
Year	Chassis	Engine	Start	Finish	Team
1966	Vollstedt	Ford	24	28	Jim Robbins
1967	Vollstedt	Ford	20	17	Vollstedt Enterprises
1971	Mongoose	Ford	14	16	Gene White Co
1972	Atlanta	Ford	32	10	Gene White Co

=== 24 Hours of Le Mans results ===
24 Hours of Le Mans results
Year	Team	Co-Drivers	Car	Class	Laps	Pos.	Class Pos.
1981	(United States) Stratagraph Inc.	(United States) Billy Hagan (United States) Bill Cooper	Chevrolet Camaro	IMSA GTO	13	DNF	DNF

== Legacy ==
Yarborough was inducted into the International Motorsports Hall of Fame in 1993, the National Motorsports Press Association Hall of Fame, and the Motorsports Hall of Fame of America in 1994, the Court of Legends at Charlotte Motor Speedway in 1996 and was named one of NASCAR's 50 Greatest Drivers (1998). In 2009, Yarborough was one of the 25 nominees for the first class to be inducted in the NASCAR Hall of Fame, though he was not selected. In 2010, he was nominated for induction in the second class of the Hall of Fame, and again he failed to make the cut. In 2011, Yarborough finally was elected to the NASCAR HOF. A stretch of South Carolina Highway 403 through Timmonsville is named Cale Yarborough Highway in his honor.

In March 2013, Yarborough was inducted into the South Carolina Hall of Fame.

== Personal life and death ==
In high school Yarborough was a halfback, then played four years of semi-pro football and was offered a tryout with the Washington Redskins.

Yarborough was married to Betty Jo Thigpen from 1961 and they had three daughters (Julie, Kelley, and B.J.). He owned Cale Yarborough Honda in Florence, South Carolina for over 25 years. He later resided in the Sardis neighborhood of Timmonsville, South Carolina. Yarborough was not related to fellow NASCAR veteran LeeRoy Yarbrough, though they were close friends.

Yarborough died at the McLeod Hospice House in Florence, South Carolina from complications of a rare genetic disorder on December 31, 2023. He was 84.

== General references ==
- "Where Are They Now? Cale Yarborough", Indianapolis Motor Speedway Official Blog

== Citations ==
Sporting positions
Preceded by Richard Petty	NASCAR Winston Cup Champion; 1976, 1977, 1978	Succeeded by Richard Petty
Preceded by Bobby Allison	IROC Champion; IROC VIII (1984)	Succeeded by Harry Gant
Achievements
Preceded by Mario Andretti; David Pearson; Bobby Allison	Daytona 500 Winner; 1968; 1977; 1983, 1984	Succeeded by LeeRoy Yarbrough; Bobby Allison; Bill Elliott
