= Julian Buesink =

American racing car owner

- Born: Julian E. Buesink; September 24, 1921; Findley Lake, New York, U.S.
- Died: September 23, 1998 (aged 77)

NASCAR Cup Series career
- 1 race run over 1 year
- First race: 1951 Race 32 (Thompson)
Wins	Top tens	Poles
0	0	0

Julian E. Buesink (September 24, 1921 – September 23, 1998) was the car owner and crew chief during Bill Rexford's 1950 NASCAR Grand National Series championship run and his teammate Lloyd Moore.

Buesink's cars competed in 156 NASCAR races with two wins, both coming in 1950 with drivers Bill Rexford and Lloyd Moore respectively. His team scored 64 Top 10 finishes. He had nine different drivers from 1951 to 1953, before Bob Duell came on board from 1956 and 1960. He ended his career as an owner with future three time champion Cale Yarborough. Yarborough made 7 starts in Buesink equipment from 1961 to 1963. He drove in his own car once in 1951, starting 17th and finishing 27th at Thompson Speedway Motorsports Park.

Buesink was a resident of Findley Lake, New York, where he owned and operated multiple automobile dealerships. He previously operated a Ford dealership on U.S. Route 20 in Westfield, New York.

Buesink died on September 23, 1998, the eve of his 78th birthday.

== Motorsports career results ==
=== NASCAR ===
(key) (Bold – Pole position awarded by qualifying time. Italics – Pole position earned by points standings or practice time. * – Most laps led.)

==== Grand National Series ====
NASCAR Grand National Series results
Year	Team	No.	Make	1	2	3	4	5	6	7	8	9	10	11	12	13	14	15	16	17	18	19	20	21	22	23	24	25	26	27	28	29	30	31	32	33	34	35	36	37	38	39	40	41	NGNC	Pts	Ref
1951	Julian Buesink	60	Ford	DAB	CLT	NMO	GAR	HBO	ASF	NWS	MAR	CAN	CLS	CLB	DSP	GAR	GRS	BAI	HEI	AWS	MCF	ALS	MSF	FMS	MOR	ABS	DAR	CLB	CCS	LAN	CLT	DSP	WIL	HBO	TPN; 27	PGS	MAR	OAK	NWS	HMS	JSP	ATL	GAR	NMO	NA	-	
