= Paul Dean Holt =

- Born: March 30, 1936 (age 90); Sweetwater, Tennessee, U.S.

NASCAR Cup Series career
- 85 races run over 6 years
- Best finish: 18th (1968)
- First race: 1966 Myers Brothers 250 (Bowman-Gray Stadium)
- Last race: 1977 Music City USA 420 (Fairgrounds Speedway)
| Wins | Top tens | Poles |
|---|---|---|
| 0 | 1 | 0 |

Paul Dean Holt (born March 30, 1936, in Sweetwater, Tennessee) is a retired NASCAR Winston Cup driver and a competitor at the 1968 Fireball 300.

== Career ==
Holt had one top-ten finish and he competed in 10604 laps and 6,540.7 miles (10,526.2 km). Holt started an average of 23rd place and finished an average of 20th. Holt also failed to lead a lap but eventually retired at the age of 41 with $19,192 ($101,967.38 when adjusted for inflation) in total career earnings. NASCAR insider Brock Beard would find out after extensive research about Paul Dean Holt's three career last-place finishes.

At the 1967 NASCAR Rookie of the Year ceremonies, Holt finished in third place behind Charlie Glotzbach and Donnie Allison (the winner of the Rookie of the Year award). Dodge and Ford vehicles were considered to the staple manufacturers of Holt's career.

Holt's best track accomplishments was at Richmond International Raceway where he finished an average of 18th place; his least favorite track was Martinsville Speedway where a finish of 32nd place was routine for him.
