= Roy Mayne =

Former race car driver

- Born: May 16, 1935
- Died: January 5, 1998 (aged 62)

NASCAR Cup Series career
- 139 races run over 12 years
- Best finish: 25th (1966)
- First race: 1963 untitled race (Spartanburg)
- Last race: 1974 Southern 500 (Darlington)
Wins	Top tens	Poles
0	22	0

Roy Mayne (May 16, 1935 – January 5, 1998) was an American professional stock car racing driver. He was a driver in the NASCAR Winston Cup Series from 1963 to 1974.
