= J. T. Putney =

American racecar driver (1928–2001)

- J. T. Putney
- Born: October 5, 1928; Arden, North Carolina, United States
- Died: April 11, 2001 (aged 72)
- Cause of death: Heart attack

NASCAR Cup Series career
- 125 races run over 4 years
- Best finish: 7th (1965)
- First race: 1964 Rebel 300 (Darlington Raceway)
- Last race: 1967 Western North Carolina 500 (Asheville-Weaverville Speedway)
Wins	Top tens	Poles
0	49	0

J. T. Putney (October 5, 1928 – April 11, 2001) was a NASCAR Grand National Series race car driver who would accomplish 16 finishes in the top-five in addition to 49 finishes in the top-ten. John B. Roberts would become Putney's employer in 1965 & 1966, and along with mechanic/engine builder Herman Beam they guided him to a seventh-place finish at the end of the 1965 NASCAR Grand National Cup Series. He is also known for retiring from the 1966 Bridgehampton Grand National race for "bad gas".

== Career ==
Putney would lead 32 laps out of the 26,094 that he would contribute to in NASCAR history – the equivalent of 20,371.2 miles (32,784.3 km). Putney's average start was 17th place while his average finish would end up being 15th place. Total earnings for this driver added up to $63,963 ($617,606.81 when adjusted for inflation). One of his notable racing accomplishments outside of NASCAR was his seventh-place finish at the 1967 ARCA 250 Daytona Race in a 1966 Chevrolet machine. Putney mainly drove the No. 22 Chevrolet machine as a driver/owner in the NASCAR Cup Series.

When he was not racing on the track, Putney had a day job at American Enka Corp. as a corporate pilot. After his NASCAR career ended, he would fly for Kingsport Press (based out of Kingsport, Tennessee) in addition to other local aircraft companies. Putney would suffer from four other heart attacks before dying of his fifth in 2001. A brief stint as a businessman gave him the opportunity to briefly own a Budget Rental Car franchise. Putney would ultimately retire from any sort of business or flying after his first heart attack in 1979. When the air traffic controllers went on strike, he joined the FAA and took over their jobs from 1981 to 1990.

Putney would leave behind his wife Joyce, four kids (Debbie Putney Buckley, Dede Buckley Wasielewski, Taylor Putney, Lloyd Putney), three siblings (Nell Putney Casteen, W.W. Putney, Blake Putney), five biological grandchildren, and a surrogate grandchild named Tucker Smith.
