= Richard Brickhouse =

American racing driver (1938–2026)

- Born: October 27, 1938; Wilmington, North Carolina, U.S.
- Died: July 24, 2026 (aged 87); Rocky Point, North Carolina, U.S.

NASCAR Cup Series career
- 38 races run over 5 years
- Best finish: 25th (1969)
- First race: 1968 Carolina 500 (Rockingham)
- Last race: 1982 Warner W. Hodgdon American 500 (Rockingham)
- First win: 1969 Talladega 500 (Talladega)
Wins	Top tens	Poles
1	13	0

Richard Fleming Brickhouse (October 27, 1938 – July 24, 2026) was an American NASCAR driver. He is best known for winning the inaugural Talladega 500 in 1969 after a boycott of the top stars of the sport at the time because concerns with tire wear with the high rate of speeds at the racetrack. Though Brickhouse ran his final race in 1982, he did attempt a comeback in 1995, at the age of 55, at Rockingham driving for former driver Dick Skillen. The comeback was cut short, as Brickhouse crashed his No. 14 Chevy in qualifying. Brickhouse concluded his career with one win, four top-fives and thirteen career top-tens in 39 races. He held the Guinness book of world records for fastest time on a closed circuit for many years. Brickhouse died on July 24, 2026, at the age of 87.

== Motorsports results ==
=== NASCAR ===
(key) (Bold – Pole position awarded by qualifying time. Italics – Pole position earned by points standings or practice time. * – Most laps led.)

==== Grand National Series ====
NASCAR Grand National Series results
Year	Team	No.	Make	1	2	3	4	5	6	7	8	9	10	11	12	13	14	15	16	17	18	19	20	21	22	23	24	25	26	27	28	29	30	31	32	33	34	35	36	37	38	39	40	41	42	43	44	45	46	47	48	49	50	51	52	53	54	NGNC	Pts	Ref
1968	Dub Clewis	03	Plymouth	MGR	MGY	RSD	DAY	BRI	RCH	ATL	HCY	GPS	CLB	NWS	MAR	AUG	AWS	DAR	BLV	LGY	CLT	ASH	MGR	SMR	BIR	CAR; 4	GPS	DAY; 17	ISP	OXF	FDA	TRN	BRI; 36	SMR	NSV	ATL; 32	CLB	BGS	AWS	SBO	LGY	DAR; 11	HCY	RCH	BLV	HBO	MAR	NWS	AUG	CLT; 40	CAR; 9	JFC						45th	514	
1969	Dub Clewis	03	Plymouth	MGR	MGY	RSD	DAY; 10	DAY	DAY; 12	CAR; 25	AUG	BRI	ATL; 8	CLB	HCY	GPS	RCH	NWS; 26	MAR; 33	AWS	DAR; 23	BLV	LGY; 13	CLT; 39	MGR; 18	SMR	MCH; 37	KPT	GPS	NCF	DAY; 7	DOV; 29	TPN; 5	TRN; 7	BLV; 20	BRI	NSV	SMR	ATL																			25th	1660	
1969	Bill Ellis	14	Dodge																																					MCH; 7	SBO	BGS	AWS; 10	DAR	HCY	RCH			MAR; 40	NWS; 7								25th	1660	
1969	Ray Nichels	99	Dodge																																												TAL; 1	CLB									TWS; 33	25th	1660	
1969	Bill Ellis	88	Dodge																																																CLT; 37	SVH	AUG	CAR; 31	JFC	MGR		25th	1660	
1970	Bill Ellis	14	Plymouth	RSD	DAY	DAY; 5	DAY; 6	RCH	CAR	SVH	ATL	BRI																																														58th	181	
1970	Tom Pistone	59	Ford										TAL; 37	NWS	CLB	DAR	BLV	LGY	CLT; 32	SMR	MAR	MCH	RSD	HCY	KPT	GPS	DAY	AST	TPN	TRN	BRI	SMR	NSV	ATL	CLB	ONA	MCH	TAL; 48	BGS	SBO	DAR	HCY	RCH	DOV	NCF	NWS	CLT	MAR	MGR	CAR	LGY							58th	181	

==== Winston Cup Series ====
NASCAR Winston Cup Series results
Year	Team	No.	Make	1	2	3	4	5	6	7	8	9	10	11	12	13	14	15	16	17	18	19	20	21	22	23	24	25	26	27	28	29	30	31	NWCC	Pts	Ref
1979	Jimmy Edwards	16	Olds	RSD	DAY	CAR	RCH	ATL	NWS	BRI	DAR	MAR	TAL	NSV	DOV	CLT	TWS	RSD	MCH	DAY	NSV	POC	TAL	MCH	BRI	DAR	RCH	DOV	MAR	CLT; 39	NWS	CAR	ATL	ONT	127th	46	
1982	Tom Goff	78	Pontiac	DAY	RCH	BRI	ATL	CAR	DAR	NWS	MAR	TAL	NSV	DOV	CLT	POC	RSD	MCH	DAY	NSV	POC	TAL	MCH	BRI	DAR	RCH	DOV	NWS	CLT; 27	MAR	CAR; 21	ATL; DNQ	RSD		89th	82	
1995	Skillen Racing	14	Chevy	DAY	CAR	RCH	ATL	DAR	BRI	NWS	MAR	TAL	SON	CLT	DOV	POC	MCH	DAY	NHA	POC	TAL	IND	GLN	MCH	BRI	DAR	RCH	DOV	MAR	NWS	CLT	CAR; DNQ	PHO	ATL	N/A	0	

===== Daytona 500 =====
Year	Team	Manufacturer	Start	Finish
1969	Dub Clewis	Plymouth	21	12
1970	Bill Ellis	Plymouth	10	6
