= 1968 Daytona 500 =

Auto race held at Daytona International Speedway in 1968

Race details
- Race 4 of 49 in the 1968 NASCAR Grand National Series season
- 1968 Daytona 500 program cover
- Date: February 25, 1968
- Location: Daytona International Speedway; Daytona Beach, Florida, U.S.
- Course: Permanent racing facility 2.5 mi (4.023 km)
- Distance: 200 laps, 500 mi (804.672 km)
- Weather: Temperatures hovering around 59 °F (15 °C); wind speeds up to 20.8 miles per hour (33.5 km/h)
- Average speed: 147.251 miles per hour (236.978 km/h)

Pole position
Driver	Cale Yarborough	Wood Brothers Racing

Most laps led
Driver	Cale Yarborough	Wood Brothers Racing
- Laps: 76

Winner
No. 21	Cale Yarborough	Wood Brothers Racing

The 1968 Daytona 500 was a NASCAR Grand National Series race held on February 25, 1968, at Daytona International Speedway in Daytona Beach, Florida. Cale Yarborough won the race from the pole

== Summary ==
The event was won by Cale Yarborough driving a 1968 Mercury. Yarborough drove his #21 to victory in just over 3 hours and 23 minutes after starting the race on the pole. There were 11 caution flags which slowed the race for 60 laps, an event record until 2005. Yarborough squeaked out the victory by less than a second over LeeRoy Yarbrough. The win was Yarborough's first victory of the season and his first victory in the "Great American Race."

This was also the only Daytona 500 where the grid was set exclusively by qualifying times. The 125-mile qualifying races were not held due to rain.

Drivers making their first Daytona 500 starts were Andy Hampton, Buddy Arrington, Bill Seifert, Dave Marcis, (Marcis would make every Daytona 500 until 2000), Earl Brooks, Dick Johnson, Dr. Don Tarr, and Dub Simpson. Drivers making their only Daytona 500 starts were Al Unser, Bob Senneker, Butch Hartman, Larry Manning, Rod Eulenfeld, Charles Burnett, Don Biederman, Stan Meserve, and Bud Moore. It was the last Daytona 500 starts for Darel Dieringer, Clyde Lynn, Sam McQuagg, Mario Andretti, Sonny Hutchins, Bob Cooper, Jerry Grant, Paul Lewis, Roy Tyner, and H. B. Bailey.

This was the race in which Junior Johnson cost his own team the race. Cale ran out of gas at some point in the race and overshot his pit as the crew wasn't expecting him. Junior Johnson was standing out waiting for Leeroy to come and he managed to put just enough gas to get Cale back around to his pit.

Al Unser led a lap in this one; it became the only time that he led a NASCAR race in his career. Dub Simpson earned a dubious distinction by becoming the only driver ever to fail to complete a lap in the race. This was also Bob "The Sneaker" Senneker's best career NASCAR finish, where he finished in 13th place. Richard Petty and his "mysterious" black vinyl roof performed well and led the race until James Hylton blew a tire and hit the turn one wall. A piece of debris from Hylton's car hit Petty's and knocked the roof loose starting a day of troubles for Richard's team because of their experiment. Petty would finish the race two laps down.

The transition to purpose-built racecars began in the early 1960s and occurred gradually over that decade. Changes made to the sport by the late 1960s brought an end to the "strictly stock" vehicles of the 1950s.

== Race results ==
Pos	Grid	No.	Driver	Entrant	Manufacturer	Laps	Winnings	Laps led	Time/Status
1	1	21	Cale Yarborough	Wood Brothers Racing	1968 Mercury	200	$47,250	76	3:23:44
2	3	26	LeeRoy Yarbrough	Junior Johnson & Associates	1968 Mercury	200	$17,525	62	+1 second
3	6	29	Bobby Allison	Bondy Long	1968 Ford	200	$10,150	12	Lead lap, under green flag
4	8	6	Al Unser	Cotton Owens	1968 Dodge	200	$6,250	1	Lead lap, under green flag
5	4	17	David Pearson	Holman-Moody	1968 Ford	199	$4,750	10	+1 Lap
6	9	99	Paul Goldsmith	Ray Nichels	1968 Plymouth	199	$4,500	0	+1 Lap
7	23	22	Darel Dieringer	Mario Rossi	1968 Plymouth	199	$4,100	0	+1 Lap
8	2	43	Richard Petty	Petty Enterprises	1968 Plymouth	198	$4,350	4	+2 Laps
9	5	16	Tiny Lund	Bud Moore Engineering	1968 Mercury	197	$2,500	0	+3 Laps
10	27	32	Andy Hampton	Rainer Racing	1967 Dodge	193	$2,525	0	+7 Laps
11	22	67	Buddy Arrington	Buddy Arrington	1967 Dodge	186	$2,350	0	+14 Laps
12	19	27	A. J. Foyt	Banjo Matthews	1968 Ford	183	$2,350	0	Transmission
13	34	84	Bob Senneker	Doug Cutler	1966 Chevrolet	182	$3,200	0	+18 Laps
14	25	20	Clyde Lynn	Clyde Lynn	1967 Mercury	182	$2,200	0	+18 Laps
15	40	45	Bill Seifert	Bill Seifert	1967 Ford	181	$2,100	0	+19 Laps
16	15	5	Butch Hartman	Butch Hartman	1968 Dodge	180	$2,275	3	+20 Laps
17	42	34	Wendell Scott	Wendell Scott	1966 Ford	179	$2,045	0	+21 Laps
18	24	46	Larry Manning	Tom Hunter	1966 Chevrolet	179	$2,110	0	+21 Laps
19	49	19	Henley Gray	Henley Gray	1966 Ford	175	$2,025	0	+25 Laps
20	35	30	Dave Marcis	Larry Wehrs	1966 Chevrolet	175	$2,015	0	+25 Laps
21	38	73	Rod Eulenfeld	Julian Kline	1966 Chevrolet	174	$2,000	0	+26 Laps
22	10	37	Sam McQuagg	Nord Krauskopf	1967 Dodge	171	$1,140	0	Engine
23	44	96	Charles Burnett	Roy Buckner	1966 Ford	146	$1,135	0	Flagged
24	31	79	Frank Warren	Harold Rhodes	1966 Chevrolet	143	$1,130	0	+57 Laps
25	17	64	Elmo Langley	Elmo Langley / Henry Woodfield	1966 Ford	141	$1,125	0	Overheating
26	37	25	Jabe Thomas	Don Robertson	1967 Ford	126	$1,120	0	Overheating
27	29	56	Jim Hurtubise	Lyle Stelter	1968 Mercury	123	$1,125	0	Crash
28	50	95	Don Biederman	James Brown	1966 Ford	123	$1,110	0	Engine
29	20	11	Mario Andretti	Holman-Moody	1968 Mercury	105	$1,580	12	Crash
30	13	3	Buddy Baker	Ray Fox	1968 Dodge	103	$1,700	20	Crash
31	28	4	John Sears	L. G. DeWitt	1967 Ford	101	$1,145	0	Crash
32	21	15	Charlie Glotzbach	Tom Friedkin	1968 Plymouth	91	$1,140	0	Engine
33	41	75	Earl Brooks	Gene Black	1966 Ford	89	$1,085	0	Crash
34	33	10	Bill Champion	Bill Champion	1966 Ford	79	$1,080	0	Overheating
35	39	18	Dick Johnson	Bob Casperson	1967 Ford	63	$1,075	0	Engine
36	11	71	Bobby Isaac	Nord Krauskopf	1968 Dodge	56	$1,070	0	Engine
37	16	7	Bobby Johns	Shorty Johns	1966 Chevrolet	55	$1,065	0	Ignition
38	47	90	Sonny Hutchins	Donlavey Racing	1967 Ford	53	$1,060	0	Engine
39	32	02	Bob Cooper	Bob Cooper	1967 Chevrolet	52	$1,055	0	Engine
40	7	66	Donnie Allison	Holman-Moody	1968 Ford	48	$1,000	0	Crash
41	43	51	Stan Meserve	Margo Hamm	1967 Dodge	34	$950	0	Brakes
42	26	14	Jerry Grant	Tom Friedkin	1968 Plymouth	32	$1,000	0	Crash
43	30	97	Red Farmer	Red Farmer	1967 Ford	24	$850	0	Engine
44	14	48	James Hylton	James Hylton	1967 Dodge	24	$800	0	Crash
45	45	0	Don Tarr	Don Tarr	1967 Chevrolet	23	$750	0	Head gasket
46	46	2	Paul Lewis	Donald Brackins	1967 Dodge	14	$700	0	Engine
47	48	9	Roy Tyner	Roy Tyner	1967 Pontiac	8	$1,650	0	Engine
48	12	1	Bud Moore	A. J. King	1968 Dodge	7	$600	0	Crash
49	18	36	H. B. Bailey	H. B. Bailey	1966 Pontiac	6	$550	0	Engine
50	36	06	Dub Simpson	Neil Castles	1967 Dodge	0	$500	0	Oil pressure

Preceded by 1968 Motor Trend 500	NASCAR Grand National Season; 1968	Succeeded by 1968 Southeastern 500
