= 1967 National 500 =

American NASCAR auto race in 1967

Race details
- Race 47 of 49 in the 1967 NASCAR Grand National Series season
- Charlie Glotzbach (72) avoided this incident and finished fourth.
- Date: October 15, 1967
- Official name: National 500
- Location: Charlotte Motor Speedway, Concord, North Carolina
- Course: Permanent racing facility
- Course length: 1.500 miles (2.414 km)
- Distance: 334 laps, 501 mi (804 km)
- Weather: Temperatures of 77 °F (25 °C); wind speeds of 8.9 miles per hour (14.3 km/h)
- Average speed: 130.317 miles per hour (209.725 km/h)
- Attendance: 60,000

Pole position
Driver	Cale Yarborough	Wood Brothers
- Time: 139.470

Most laps led
Driver	Buddy Baker	Ray Fox
- Laps: 160

Winner
No. 3	Buddy Baker	Ray Fox

The 1967 National 500 was a NASCAR Grand National Series stock car race that was held on October 15, 1967, at Charlotte Motor Speedway in Concord, North Carolina.

The transition to purpose-built racecars began in the early 1960s and occurred gradually over that decade. Changes made to the sport by the late 1960s brought an end to the "strictly stock" vehicles of the 1950s.

== Race report ==
The race was held on a dry circuit; with no precipitation recorded around the speedway.

Sixty thousand live spectators attended the event where Buddy Baker managed to defeat Bobby Isaac by more than one lap; becoming the 100th different driver to win what is now known as a NASCAR Cup Series race. Nine cautions were handed out by NASCAR officials for 64 laps. The race took three hours and fifty minutes to fully complete. Cale Yarborough achieved the pole position with a qualifying speed of 130.317 miles per hour (209.725 km/h). In reality, the speeds in the race actually approached 130.317 miles per hour (209.725 km/h). Whitey Gerken finished in last place due to a crash on lap 2 out of the 334 laps raced on a paved track spanning 1.500 miles (2.414 km). All 44 of the drivers on the racing grid were American-born males. Future three time Formula One Champion Jackie Stewart entered but he failed to qualify.

Richard Petty 10-race winning streak ended at this race. Bobby Wawak made his best career finish as an owner with one of his vehicles finishing in seventh place. The qualifying speeds recorded for the race were an average for a 4-lap qualifying run. J.T. Putney raced his way into this one by winning the last chance qualifying race. He then finished 11th in the main event with Henley Gray, another driver who raced in, taking 12th.

LeeRoy Yarbrough was scheduled to drive in Junior Johnson's No. 26 vehicle but the car was wrecked in practice due to a fire extinguisher going off automatically. 22 lead changes were made amongst seven different leaders.

Notable crew chiefs on attendance for the race were Harry Hyde, Dale Inman, Jake Elder among others.

Don Schissler and Dub Simpson made their NASCAR debuts here. The total prize purse for this race was $87,005 ($840,093 when adjusted for inflation). Buddy Baker received $18,950 in winnings ($182,975 when adjusted for inflation) while last-place finisher Whitey Gerken walked away with only $625 ($6,035 when adjusted for inflation).

=== Qualifying ===
Note: The speeds shown are an average for a 4-lap qualifying run.

The first 37 spots in the field were set via qualifying. The final 7 spots were filled by the top 7 finishers in a 20-lap qualifying race.

Grid	No.	Driver	Manufacturer	Qualifying time	Speed	Owner
1	21	Cale Yarborough	'67 Ford	2:19.470	154.872	Wood Brothers
2	27	A.J. Foyt	'67 Ford	2:19.960	154.329	Banjo Matthews
3	99	Paul Goldsmith	'67 Plymouth	2:20.070	154.208	Ray Nichels
4	3	Buddy Baker	'67 Dodge	2:20.200	154.065	Ray Fox
5	43	Richard Petty	'67 Plymouth	2:20.490	153.747	Petty Enterprises
6	6	Darel Dieringer	'67 Dodge	2:20.941	153.256	Cotton Owens
7	17	David Pearson	'67 Ford	2:21.101	153.082	Holman-Moody
8	29	Dick Hutcherson	'67 Ford	2:21.640	152.499	Bondy Long
9	72	Charlie Glotzbach	'65 Dodge	2:22.370	151.717	Nord Krauskopf
10	48	James Hylton	'65 Dodge	2:22.321	151.770	Bud Hartje

== Finishing order ==
Section reference:

1. Buddy Baker
2. Bobby Isaac
3. Dick Hutcherson
4. Charlie Glotzbach
5. G.C. Spencer
6. Don White
7. Bobby Wawak
8. Neil Castles
9. Buddy Arrington
10. Cale Yarborough*
11. J.T. Putney
12. Henley Gray
13. Bobby Allison*
14. Frank Warren
15. Donnie Allison*
16. John Sears*
17. Wayne Smith
18. Richard Petty*
19. Darel Dieringer*
20. Sonny Hutchins*
21. Roy Tyner
22. A. J. Foyt*
23. Clyde Lynn*
24. David Pearson*
25. Jim Paschal*
26. Jack Bowsher*
27. Mario Andretti*
28. Wendell Scott*
29. Bud Moore*
30. Elmo Langley*
31. Red Farmer*
32. Larry Manning*
33. Dub Simpson*
34. Curtis Turner*
35. E.J. Trivette*
36. Friday Hassler*
37. Larry Hess*
38. Paul Goldsmith*
39. Bob Cooper*
40. Don Schissler*
41. Bobby Mausgrover*
42. Gordon Johncock*
43. James Hylton*
44. Whitey Gerken*

* Driver failed to finish race

== Failed to qualify ==
Section reference:

Name	Number	Car manufacturer
LeeRoy Yarbrough	26	Ford
Jackie Stewart	5	Dodge
Frog Fagan	75	Ford
Bill Seifert	45	Ford
Don Biederman	94	Chevrolet
Ken Spikes	62	Pontiac

Preceded by 1967 Wilkes 400	NASCAR Winston Cup Series Season; 1967	Succeeded by 1967 American 500

Preceded by 1966	National 500 races 1967	Succeeded by 1968
