= Don Biederman (racing driver) =

- Born: February 20, 1940; Kirkland Lake, Ontario, Canada
- Died: May 31, 1999 (aged 59); Brantford, Ontario, Canada
- Achievements: 1977 Oxford 250 winner

NASCAR Cup Series career
- 42 races run over 4 years
- Best finish: 38th (1967)
- First race: 1966 Old Dominion 400 (Manassas)
- Last race: 1969 Texas 500 (College Station)
Wins	Top tens	Poles
0	2	0

Don Biederman (February 20, 1940 – May 31, 1999) was a Canadian stock car racer from Port Credit, Ontario.

== Racing career ==
Biederman was the first Canadian ever to campaign for a full season in the NASCAR Cup Series formerly known as the NASCAR Grand National Series.

Biederman won the prestigious Oxford 250 at Oxford Plains Speedway, Maine in 1977, one of only four Canadians to do so, with Junior Hanley, Derek Lynch, and Dave Whitlock being the others.

Biederman won the IWK 250 at Riverside International Speedway in James River, Nova Scotia on three consecutive occasions from 1979–1981.

== Death and legacy ==
On May 31, 1999, Biederman died suddenly of a brain aneurysm at his home in Brantford, Ontario at the age of 59.

Since 2000, the OSCAAR Racing series has held a race in his honour entitled "The Don Biederman Memorial" at Flamboro Speedway in Millgrove, Ontario.

== Awards ==
- Biederman was posthumously inducted into the Canadian Motorsport Hall of Fame in 2001
- Biederman was posthumously enshrined on the Riverside International Speedway Wall of Fame

== Motorsports results ==
=== NASCAR ===
(key) (Bold – Pole position awarded by qualifying time. Italics – Pole position earned by points standings or practice time. * – Most laps led.)

==== Grand National Series ====
NASCAR Grand National Series results
Year	Team	No.	Make	1	2	3	4	5	6	7	8	9	10	11	12	13	14	15	16	17	18	19	20	21	22	23	24	25	26	27	28	29	30	31	32	33	34	35	36	37	38	39	40	41	42	43	44	45	46	47	48	49	50	51	52	53	54	NGNC	Pts
1966	Ron Stotten	94	Ford	AUG	RSD	DAY	DAY	DAY	CAR	BRI	ATL	HCY	CLB	GPS	BGS	NWS	MAR	DAR	LGY	MGR	MON	RCH	CLT	DTS	ASH	PIF	SMR	AWS	BLV	GPS	DAY	ODS; 22																										58th	2302
1966	Ron Stotten	94	Chevy																														BRR; 21	OXF; 25	FON; 18	ISP; 14	BRI	SMR; 20	NSV; 19	ATL	CLB; 19	AWS	BLV; 18	BGS; 11	DAR	HCY	RCH	HBO; 13	MAR; 36	NWS; 27	CLT	CAR; 22						58th	2302
1967	Ron Stotten	94	Chevy	AUG; 12	RSD; 16																								GPS; 17	MGY; 17	DAY; 34	TRN; 25	OXF; 24	FDA; 18	ISP; 16	BRI	SMR; 15	NSV; 7	ATL; 30	BGS	CLB	SVH; 20	DAR; 20	HCY; 20	RCH; 27	BLV; 28	HBO	MAR; 30	NWS; 28	CLT; DNQ	CAR; DNQ	AWS; 17						38th	5850
1967	Don Biederman	09	Chevy			DAY; 23	DAY	DAY; DNQ	AWS	BRI	GPS	BGS	ATL	CLB	HCY	NWS	MAR	SVH	RCH																																							38th	5850
1967	Bill Seifert	45	Ford																	DAR; 13	BLV	LGY	CLT	ASH	MGR	SMR	BIR	CAR																														38th	5850
1968	Ron Stotten	94	Chevy	MGR	MGY; 19	RSD																																																				77	N/A
1968	James Brown	95	Ford				DAY; 28	BRI	RCH	ATL	HCY	GPS	CLB	NWS	MAR	AUG	AWS	DAR	BLV	LGY	CLT	ASH	MGR	SMR	BIR	CAR	GPS	DAY	ISP	OXF	FDA	TRN	BRI	SMR	NSV	ATL	CLB	BGS	AWS	SBO	LGY	DAR	HCY	RCH	BLV	HBO	MAR	NWS	AUG	CLT	CAR	JFC						77	N/A
1969	Dennis Holt	23	Ford	MGR	MGY	RSD	DAY; 17	DAY	DAY; Wth	CAR																																																88th	43
1969	Larry Wehrs	00	Chevy								AUG; 8	BRI	ATL	CLB	HCY	GPS	RCH	NWS; DNQ	MAR	AWS	DAR	BLV	LGY	CLT	MGR	SMR	MCH	KPT	GPS	NCF	DAY	DOV	TPN	TRN	BLV	BRI	NSV	SMR	ATL	MCH	SBO	BGS	AWS	DAR	HCY	RCH	TAL	CLB	MAR	NWS	CLT	SVH	AUG	CAR	JFC			88th	43
1969	Bill Champion	70	Ford																																																					MGR; 25	TWS; 19	88th	43

===== Daytona 500 results =====
Year	Team	Manufacturer	Start	Finish
1967	Don Biederman	Chevy	DNQ	
1968	James Brown	Ford	50	28
1969	Dennis Holt	Ford	Wth	

== See also ==
- Frog Fagan

Achievements
Preceded by Frank Fraser	Riverside 250 Winner; 1979, 1980, 1981	Succeeded by Greg Sewart
