= Bud Moore (racing driver) =

American racing driver

- Born: Paul Hagan Moore; December 7, 1940; Charleston, South Carolina, U.S.
- Died: August 1, 2017 (aged 76)

NASCAR Cup Series career
- 41 races run over 6 years
- Best finish: 29th (1968)
- First race: 1964 Nashville 400 (Nashville)
- Last race: 1973 Southern 500 (Darlington)
Wins	Top tens	Poles
0	19	1

Paul "Bud" Moore (December 7, 1940 – August 1, 2017) was an American NASCAR driver born in Charleston, South Carolina. He was sometimes known as "Little Bud" to avoid confusion with a NASCAR owner with the same name.

== Career ==
Moore's first-ever race in NASCAR was in the Grand National Series on August 2, 1964. He started the race in a 1963 Ford, but dropped within three laps due to overheating problems.

Moore's best season of his racing career was in 1965, where he managed to grab three top fives, seven top tens, and even a pole, driving Louis Weathersbee's No. 45 Plymouth and competing in just fourteen races. Moore's best season in the point standings, however, was in 1968, where he finished 29th in those standings. Bud's final race in his relatively short career was five years after his second to last race, at the 1973 Southern 500 at the Darlington Raceway. He only completed 174 of the 367 laps, retiring from the race due to engine problems in his 1971 Mercury.

== Later years ==
Following his racing career, Moore continued his support by working in various areas, including promotions and collectibles.

Moore died on August 1, 2017, at age 76.

== Motorsports career results ==
=== NASCAR ===
(key) (Bold – Pole position awarded by qualifying time. Italics – Pole position earned by points standings or practice time. * – Most laps led.)

==== Grand National Series ====
NASCAR Grand National Series results
Year	Team	No.	Make	1	2	3	4	5	6	7	8	9	10	11	12	13	14	15	16	17	18	19	20	21	22	23	24	25	26	27	28	29	30	31	32	33	34	35	36	37	38	39	40	41	42	43	44	45	46	47	48	49	50	51	52	53	54	55	56	57	58	59	60	61	62	NGNC	Pts	Ref
1964		66	Ford	CON	AUG	JSP	SVH	RSD	DAY	DAY	DAY	RCH	BRI	GPS	BGS	ATL	AWS	HBO	PIF	CLB	NWS	MAR	SVH	DAR	LGY	HCY	SBO	CLT	GPS	ASH	ATL	CON	NSV	CHT	BIR	VAL	PIF	DAY	ODS	OBS	BRR	ISP	GLN	LIN	BRI	NSV; 27	MBS	AWS	DTS	ONA	CLB	BGS	STR													102nd	368	
1964	Louis Weathersbee	45	Plymouth																																																			DAR; 25	HCY	RCH	ODS	HBO	MAR	SVH	NWS	CLT	HAR	AUG	JAC; 20	102nd	368	
1965	Louis Weathersbee	45	Plymouth	RSD	DAY	DAY	DAY	PIF; 10	ASW	RCH	HBO; 3	ATL	**GPS**; 4	NWS	MAR	CLB; 18	BRI	DAR	LGY; 14	BGS	HCY; 21	CLT	CCF; 2	ASH; 7	HAR; 18	NSV	BIR	ATL	GPS; 9*	MBS; 18	VAL	DAY																																		49th	3216	
1965	Sam Fogle	31	Ford																														ODS; 8	OBS	ISP	GLN	BRI	NSV	CCF	AWS	SMR	PIF	AUG																							49th	3216	
1965	Langley Racing	64	Ford																																									CLB; 18	DTS	BLV	BGS																			49th	3216	
1965	Jabe Thomas	25	Ford																																													DAR; 40	HCY	LIN	ODS	RCH	MAR	NWS	CLT	HBO	CAR	DTS								49th	3216	
1966	Gene Black	75	Ford	AUG	RSD	DAY	DAY	DAY	CAR	BRI	ATL	HCY	CLB	GPS	BGS	NWS	MAR	DAR	LGY	MGR	MON	RCH	CLT	DTS	ASH	PIF	SMR	AWS	BLV	GPS; 16	DAY	ODS	BRR	OXF	FON	ISP	BRI	SMR	NSV	ATL	CLB	AWS	BLV	BGS	DAR	HCY	RCH	HBO	MAR	NWS	CLT	CAR														107th	160	
1967	King Enterprises	53	Dodge	AUG	RSD	DAY	DAY	DAY	AWS	BRI	GPS	BGS	ATL	CLB	HCY	NWS	MAR	SVH	RCH	DAR	BLV	LGY	CLT	ASH	MGR	SMR	BIR	CAR	GPS	MGY	DAY	TRN	OXF	FDA	ISP	BRI	SMR	NSV	ATL; 5	BGS	CLB		DAR; 5	HCY	RCH	BLV	HBO	MAR	NWS; 33	CLT; 29	CAR; 6	AWS														35th	7812	
1967	Emory Gilliam	00	Dodge																																							SVH; 18																								35th	7812	
1968	King Enterprises	1	Dodge	MGR	MGY	RSD	DAY; 48	BRI; 6	RCH	ATL; 27	HCY	GPS	CLB	NWS	MAR; 6	AUG	AWS	DAR; 9	BLV	LGY	CLT; 39	ASH	MGR	SMR; 8	BIR	CAR; 41	GPS	DAY; 7	ISP	OXF	FDA	TRN	BRI																																	29th	1086	
1968	Bondy Long	29	Ford																															SMR; 2	NSV	ATL; 7	CLB; 24	BGS	AWS	SBO	LGY	DAR; 8	HCY	RCH	BLV	HBO	MAR; 4	NWS	AUG	CLT; 45	CAR; 42	JFC														29th	1086	

==== Winston Cup Series ====
NASCAR Winston Cup Series results
Year	Team	No.	Make	1	2	3	4	5	6	7	8	9	10	11	12	13	14	15	16	17	18	19	20	21	22	23	24	25	26	27	28	NWCC	Pts	Ref
1973	Donlavey Racing	90	Mercury	RSD	DAY	RCH	CAR	BRI	ATL	NWS	DAR	MAR	TAL	NSV	CLT	DOV	TWS	RSD	MCH	DAY	BRI	ATL	TAL	NSV	DAR; 29	RCH	DOV	NWS	MAR	CLT	CAR	110th	-	

===== Daytona 500 =====
Year	Team	Manufacturer	Start	Finish
1968	King Enterprises	Dodge	12	48
