= 1969 Texas 500 =

Auto race held at Texas World Speedway in 1969

Coordinates: 30.537°N 96.221°W

Race details
- Race 54 of 54 in the 1969 NASCAR Grand National Series season Race 20 of 20 in the 1969 NASCAR Pacific Coast Late Model Division season
- Layout of Texas World Speedway
- Date: December 7, 1969
- Official name: Texas 500
- Location: Texas World Speedway, College Station, Texas
- Course: Permanent racing facility
- Course length: 2.000 miles (3.218 km)
- Distance: 250 laps, 500 mi (804 km)
- Weather: Cold with temperatures of 55.9 °F (13.3 °C); wind speeds of 15 miles per hour (24 km/h)
- Average speed: 144.277 miles per hour (232.191 km/h)
- Attendance: 23,508

Pole position
Driver	Buddy Baker	Owens Racing

Most laps led
Driver	Buddy Baker	Owens Racing
- Laps: 150

Winner
No. 71	Bobby Isaac	K&K Insurance Racing

Television in the United States
- Network: untelevised
- Announcers: none

The 1969 Texas 500 was a NASCAR Grand National Series event that was held on December 7, 1969, at Texas World Speedway in College Station, Texas.

Souvenir racing programs were sold at the event for the then-inexpensive cost of US$1 per copy ($8.78 when adjusted for inflation).

The extra four degrees of banking made the cars 16 miles per hour or 26 kilometres per hour faster than their speeds while racing at Michigan International Speedway.

== Race report ==
Bobby Isaac would win this race in his 1969 Dodge Charger; gaining $15,640 in prize winnings ($137,311.25 when inflation is taken into effect). He would end an impressive 17-win season with a win in this event.

Buddy Baker earned the pole position with a speed of 176.284 miles per hour (283.702 km/h) while the average speed of the race was 144.277 miles per hour (232.191 km/h). More than 23,000 race fans would see Donnie Allison lose the race by more than two laps. Don Biederman was the only foreign-born driver (he was born in Port Credit, Ontario) and raced under the employ of Bill Champion for this race in a 1968 Ford Torino. Roy Tyner would finish in last place after picking up an engine problem on lap 2 with his 1969 Pontiac vehicle. Other notable drivers to develop problems in the race were: Elmo Langley, Cale Yarborough, Ed Negre, and Bill Seifert. Wendell Scott (the first African American driver in NASCAR history to win a race), Buddy Baker (who was the highest finishing driver to DNF from the race in 8th place), and Benny Parsons were three other notable drivers of this decade who participated in the race.

Yarborough would acquire a serious injury after clobbering his vehicle into one of the walls.

NASCAR on ABC would begin televising a select number of races during the 1970 NASCAR Grand National Series season. The televised broadcasting of NASCAR races eventually brought this once-regional motorsport into the national spotlight and eventually gained a major sponsor through Big Tobacco manufacturer R.J. Reynolds Tobacco Company for the 1971 season. This alliance between tobacco and stock car racing would last until the 2004 NASCAR Cup Series season. The transition to purpose-built racecars began in the early 1960s and occurred gradually over that decade. Changes made to the sport by the late 1960s brought an end to the "strictly stock" vehicles of the 1950s.

Biederman would make his grand exit from the NASCAR Cup Series after this race while Joe Hines would make his introduction into top-level stock car racing here. David Pearson would eventually merge as the eventual champion for the year. Pearson would later be recognized for winning his races more consistently than Richard Petty (who finished 21st in this race and would stop racing in Ford vehicles after this race) but would have an abbreviated racing career compared to him.

Notable crew chiefs for this race were Herb Nab, Harry Hyde, Dale Inman, Banjo Matthews, Glen Wood, Dick Hutcherson, and Cotton Owens.

=== Qualifying ===
Grid	No.	Driver	Manufacturer	Owner
1	6	Buddy Baker	'69 Dodge	Cotton Owens
2	17	David Pearson	'69 Ford	Holman-Moody Racing
3	98	LeeRoy Yarbrough	'69 Ford	Junior Johnson
4	21	Cale Yarborough	'69 Mercury	Wood Brothers
5	99	Richard Brickhouse	'69 Dodge	Ray Nichels
6	27	Donnie Allison	'69 Ford	Banjo Matthews
7	71	Bobby Isaac	'69 Dodge	Nord Krauskopf
8	22	Bobby Allison	'69 Dodge	Mario Rossi
9	96	Ray Elder	'69 Dodge	Fred Elder
10	30	Dave Marcis	'69 Dodge	Milt Lunda
11	48	James Hylton	'69 Dodge	James Hylton
12	32	Dick Brooks	'69 Plymouth	Dick Brooks
13	10	Bill Champion	'68 Ford	Bill Champion
14	8	Frank Warren	'67 Plymouth	G.C. Spencer
15	76	Ben Arnold	'68 Ford	Don Culpepper
16	4	John Sears	'69 Ford	L.G. DeWitt
17	39	Friday Hassler	'69 Chevrolet	Friday Hassler
18	06	Neil Castles	'69 Dodge	Neil Castles
19	74	Bill Shirey	'69 Plymouth	Bill Shirey
20	45	Bill Seifert	'69 Ford	Bill Seifert

== Finishing order ==
Section reference:

1. Bobby Isaac† (No. 71)
2. Donnie Allison (No. 27)
3. Benny Parsons† (No. 18)
4. James Hylton† (No. 48)
5. Dick Brooks† (No. 32)
6. Ray Elder† (No. 96)
7. Jack McCoy (No. 7)
8. Buddy Baker*† (No. 6)
9. Dave Marcis (No. 30)
10. LeeRoy Yarbrough*† (No. 98)
11. Cecil Gordon† (No. 47)
12. Jabe Thomas† (No. 25)
13. E. J. Trivette (No. 08)
14. Johnny Halford† (No. 57)
15. Friday Hassler*† (No.39)
16. Neil Castles (No. 06)
17. Henley Gray (No. 19)
18. Wendell Scott† (No. 34)
19. Don Biederman† (No. 70)
20. H. B. Bailey*† (No. 36)
21. Richard Petty* (No. 43)
22. Dave Alonzo (No. 81)
23. Bobby Allison*† (No. 22)
24. Earl Brooks*† (No. 26)
25. Cale Yarborough*† (No. 21)
26. David Pearson*† (No. 17)
27. Elmo Langley*† (No.64)
28. Bill Shirey* (No. 74)
29. Ben Arnold* (No. 76)
30. Frank Warren* (No.8)
31. Bill Champion*† (No. 10)
32. John Sears*† (No. 4)
33. Richard Brickhouse* (No. 99)
34. Joe Hines* (No.03)
35. Ed Negre*† (No. 0)
36. Bill Seifert* (No. 45)
37. Larry Baumel* (No. 69)
38. Roy Tyner*† (No. 9)

† signifies that the driver is known to be deceased
* Driver failed to finish race

Preceded by 1969 Georgia 500	NASCAR Grand National Series Season; 1969–70	Succeeded by 1970 Motor Trend 500

Preceded by 1968 Peach State 200	NASCAR season-ending races 1949-present	Succeeded by 1970 Tidewater 300
