= 1968 American 500 =

Auto race held at North Carolina Motor Speedway in 1968

Race details
- Race 48 of 49 in the 1968 NASCAR Grand National Series season
- Layout of Rockingham Speedway
- Date: October 27, 1968
- Official name: American 500
- Location: North Carolina Motor Speedway, Rockingham, North Carolina
- Course: Permanent racing facility
- Course length: 1.017 miles (1.636 km)
- Distance: 492 laps, 500 mi (804 km)
- Weather: Chilly with temperatures of 67.3 °F (19.6 °C); wind speeds of 9.9 miles per hour (15.9 km/h)
- Average speed: 105.06 miles per hour (169.08 km/h)
- Attendance: 32,000

Pole position
Driver	Cale Yarborough	Wood Brothers Racing

Most laps led
Driver	Richard Petty	Petty Enterprises
- Laps: 216

Winner
No. 43	Richard Petty	Petty Enterprises

Television in the United States
- Network: untelevised
- Announcers: none

The 1968 American 500 was a NASCAR Grand National Series event that was held on October 27, 1968, at North Carolina Motor Speedway in Rockingham, North Carolina.

The transition to purpose-built racecars began in the early 1960s and occurred gradually over that decade. Changes made to the sport by the late 1960s brought an end to the "strictly stock" vehicles of the 1950s.

== Background ==
North Carolina Motor Speedway was opened as a flat, one-mile oval on October 31, 1965. In 1969, the track was extensively reconfigured to a high-banked, D-shaped oval just over one mile in length. In 1997, North Carolina Motor Speedway merged with Penske Motorsports, and was renamed North Carolina Speedway. Shortly thereafter, the infield was reconfigured, and competition on the infield road course, mostly by the SCCA, was discontinued. Currently, the track is home to the Fast Track High Performance Driving School,

== Race report ==
There were 44 drivers who managed to qualify for this event. Only one foreigner was present – Australian-born driver Frank Gardner – would become the last-place driver due to an incident requiring a black flag on the first lap. He would become the "prototype" for Cup Series driver Marcos Ambrose even though Garnder would never run another Cup Series race after this one. Gardner's last-place finish within the confines of the American stock car world was eventually overshadowed by his championship victory at the 1968 British Saloon Car Championship while driving a European version of the Ford Escort Twin Cam.

American-born driver Dexter Gainey would be black-flagged exactly forty laps later and would be disqualified as well. Wendell Scott would become the lowest-finishing driver to complete the event; albeit 191 laps behind the lead lap drivers. Five hundred laps was raced at this event for a duration for four hours and forty-five minutes. Speeds on the track would reach around 105.06 miles per hour or 169.08 kilometres per hour for the entire course of this race. Thirty-two thousand spectators would witness another Richard Petty victory with him out-racing David Pearson by a time of fifteen seconds. LeeRoy Yarbrough would finish in third place, and two laps behind the top two finishers. Petty was running an older chassis with current sheet metal because he could not get his 1968 vehicle to run on a super-speedway. Shortly after this race, his switch to Ford for 1969 was announced.

Cale Yarborough's solo qualifying performance of 118.677 miles per hour (190.992 km/h) would help him clinch the pole position for the event. While Yarborough and Bobby Isaac would dominate the opening laps of this event, the event ended up being a "Petty and Pearson" show for the final 100 laps. Glotzbach quit after he turned Bud Moore into the wall separating pit road from the racetrack on lap 59. Moore swerved to avoid a loose wheel on pit road and swerved into Glotzbach's path. Glotzbach was penalized a lap for the crash, so he parked the car.

Individual race winnings for the drivers ranged from the winner's share of $17,075 ($154,394 when adjusted for inflation) to the last-place finisher's share of $515 ($4,657 when adjusted for inflation). The entire prize purse that was handed out to all the qualifying participants was $69,800 ($631,139 when adjusted for inflation). Twelve notable crew chiefs were reported as participating in the race; including Jake Elder, Bud Moore, Glen Wood, Banjo Matthews, Dale Inman, Harry Hyde and Junior Johnson.

=== Qualifying ===
Grid	No.	Driver	Manufacturer
1	21	Cale Yarborough	'68 Mercury
2	17	David Pearson	'68 Dodge
3	71	Bobby Isaac	'68 Dodge
4	43	Richard Petty	'68 Plymouth
5	99	Paul Goldsmith	'68 Dodge
6	98	LeeRoy Yarbrough	'68 Ford
7	6	Charlie Glotzbach	'68 Dodge
8	14	Bobby Allison	'68 Plymouth
9	16	Tiny Lund	'68 Mercury
10	3	Buddy Baker	'68 Dodge
11	22	Darell Dieringer	'68 Plymouth
12	1	Pete Hamilton	'68 Dodge
13	27	Donnie Allison	'68 Ford
14	91	Don White	'68 Dodge
15	29	Bud Moore	'68 Ford
16	84	G.C. Spencer	'68 Ford
17	48	James Hylton	'68 Dodge
18	75	Butch Hartman	'68 Dodge
19	4	John Sears	'67 Ford
20	03	Richard Brickhouse	'67 Plymouth

== Finishing order ==
Section reference:

1. Richard Petty
2. David Pearson
3. LeeRoy Yarbrough
4. Tiny Lund
5. Bobby Allison
6. Don White
7. James Hylton
8. G.C. Spencer
9. Richard Brickhouse
10. Butch Hartman
11. John Sears
12. Friday Hassler
13. Bobby Johns
14. Bill Seifert
15. Clyde Lynn
16. Donnie Allison
17. Bobby Isaac
18. Earl Brooks
19. Roy Tyner
20. Walson Gardner
21. Henley Gray
22. Dick Johnson
23. Jabe Thomas
24. Dave Marcis
25. Buddy Baker
26. Cale Yarborough
27. Wendell Scott
28. Bill Champion
29. Paul Goldsmith
30. Tommy Gale
31. Red Farmer
32. Neil Castles
33. Darrell Dieringer
34. Pete Hamilton
35. J.D. McDuffie
36. James Sears
37. Don Tarr
38. Ervin Pruett
39. E.J. Trivette
40. Elmo Langley
41. Charlie Glotzbach
42. Bud Moore
43. Dexter Gainey
44. Frank Gardner

Preceded by 1968 National 500	NASCAR Grand National Season; 1968	Succeeded by 1968 Peach State 200

Preceded by 1967	American 500 races 1968	Succeeded by 1969

Preceded by 1968 Wilkes 400	Richard Petty's Career Wins; 1960-1984	Succeeded by November 1969 Georgia 500
