= 1968 Dixie 250 =

Auto race held at Augusta Speedway in 1968

Race details
- Race 13 of 49 in the 1968 NASCAR Grand National Series season
- Date: May 3, 1968; 58 years ago
- Official name: Dixie 250
- Location: Augusta Speedway, Augusta, Georgia
- Course: Permanent racing facility
- Course length: 0.500 miles (0.804 km)
- Distance: 300 laps, 125 mi (216 km)
- Weather: Temperatures of 84.9 °F (29.4 °C) with wind speeds of 14 miles per hour (23 km/h)
- Average speed: 73.099 miles per hour (117.641 km/h)

Pole position
Driver	Bobby Isaac	Nord Krauskopf

Most laps led
Driver	Bobby Isaac	Nord Krauskopf
- Laps: 242

Winner
No. 71	Bobby Isaac	Nord Krauskopf

Television in the United States
- Network: untelevised
- Announcers: none

The 1968 Dixie 250 was a NASCAR Grand National Series event that was held on May 3, 1968, at Augusta Speedway in Augusta, Georgia.

This is the only race of the year that eventual 1968 NASCAR Grand National Series champion David Pearson didn't run.

== Race report ==
Two hundred and fifty laps were done on a paved oval track spanning 0.500 miles (0.805 km) for a grand total of 125.0 miles (201.2 km). The race took one hour, forty-two minutes, and thirty-six seconds to reach its full conclusion: Bobby Isaac defeated Buddy Baker by more than a lap; bringing home $1,100 as the winner's top prize ($10,184 when considering inflation).

Canadian driver Frog Fagan participated in this event as the only non-American driver. Four thousand and five hundred people went to see speeds averaging 73.099 miles per hour (117.641 km/h) with Bobby Isaac gaining the pole position with a speed of 83.877 miles per hour (134.987 km/h). Bobby Isaac would go on to earn three pole positions during the 1968 NASCAR Grand National Series season and 19 pole positions during the following season; making him a prototypical version of Ryan Newman with his blistering speeds that he would register during qualifying.

Notable crew chiefs who attended the race were Ray Hicks, Frankie Scott, Dale Inman and Harry Hyde.

Total winnings for this event were $6,260 ($57,957 when considering inflation). In this race, Bob Cooper finished in 22nd place and won $100 just for driving a stock car as fast and as efficiently as possible. A man could have easily supported himself by earning $100 a week back in the late-1960s and lived comfortably. In the 21st century, a typical person needs to make at least $1000 a week in order to make ends meet.

The transition to purpose-built racecars began in the early 1960s and occurred gradually over that decade. Changes made to the sport by the late 1960s brought an end to the "strictly stock" vehicles of the 1950s.

=== Qualifying ===
Grid	No.	Driver	Manufacturer	Owner
1	71	Bobby Isaac	'67 Dodge	Nord Krauskopf
2	55	LeeRoy Yarborough	'67 Ford	Lyle Stelter
3	12	Tom Pistone	'68 Mercury	Tom Pistone
4	43	Richard Petty	'68 Plymouth	Petty Enterprises
5	48	James Hylton	'67 Dodge	James Hylton
6	4	John Sears	'67 Ford	L.G. DeWitt
7	3	Buddy Baker	'67 Dodge	Ray Fox
8	79	Frank Warren	'67 Chevrolet	Harold Rhodes
9	94	Elmo Langley	'66 Ford	Elmo Langley / Henry Woodfield
10	06	Neil Castles	'67 Plymouth	Neil Castles

== Timeline ==
Section reference:

- Start of race: Bobby Isaac started the race with the pole position.
- Lap 17: Stan Meserve noticed that his vehicle had a problematic ignition.
- Lap 20: Bill Cooper's engine developed problems.
- Lap 30: Bill Seifett had a terminal crash, causing him to leave the event.
- Lap 54: Henley Grey's vehicle managed to overheat, Frog Fagan's suspension developed problems that ended his day on the track.
- Lap 86: The axle on Richard Petty's vehicle acted up, stopping his race for the weekend.
- Lap 87: The rear end of Roy Tyner's vehicle fell off, forcing him to finish outside the top-15.
- Lap 125: J.D. McDuffie's vehicle developed problems with its rear end.
- Lap 131: Tom Pistone takes over the lead from Bobby Isaac.
- Lap 139: Bobby Isaac takes over the lead from Tom Pistone.
- Lap 158: LeeRoy Yarbrough's vehicle developed problems with its rear end.
- Lap 170: John Sears' vehicle developed problems with its rear end.
- Lap 175: Neil Castles' engine became problematic.
- Lap 188: Elmo Langley's vehicle developed a problematic engine.
- Lap 233: Frank Warren suffered a terminal crash, forcing him out of the race.
- Finish: Bobby Isaac was officially declared the winner of the event.

== Finishing order ==
Section reference:

1. Bobby Isaac (No. 71)
2. Buddy Baker (No. 3)
3. Tom Pistone (No. 12)
4. James Hylton (No. 48)
5. Buck Baker (No. 87)
6. Clyde Lynn (No. 20)
7. Frank Warren* (No. 79)
8. Wendell Scott (No. 34)
9. Jabe Thomas (No. 25)
10. Bob Moore (No. 96)
11. Paul Dean Holt (No. 01)
12. Elmo Langley* (No. 64)
13. Neil Castles* (No. 06)
14. John Sears* (No. 4)
15. LeeRoy Yarbrough* (No. 55)
16. J.D. McDuffie* (No. 70)
17. Roy Tyner* (No. 09)
18. Richard Petty* (No. 43)
19. Henley Gray* (No. 19)
20. Frog Fagan* (No. 95)
21. Bill Seifert* (No. 45)
22. Bob Cooper* (No. 02)
23. Stan Meserve* (No. 51)

* Driver failed to finish race

Preceded by 1968 Virginia 500	NASCAR Grand National Season; 1968	Succeeded by 1968 Fireball 300
