= 1968 Peach State 200 =

Auto race held at Gresham Motorsports Park in 1968

Race details
- Race 49 of 49 in the 1968 NASCAR Grand National Series season
- Jefco Speedway (Now Gresham Motorsports Park)
- Date: November 3, 1968; 56 years ago
- Official name: Peach State 200
- Location: Jefco Speedway, Jefferson, Georgia
- Course: Permanent racing facility
- Course length: 0.800 km (0.500 miles)
- Distance: 200 laps, 100 mi (150 km)
- Weather: Mild with temperatures of 75 °F (24 °C); wind speeds of 6 miles per hour (9.7 km/h)
- Average speed: 77.737 miles per hour (125.106 km/h)
- Attendance: 5,200

Pole position
Driver	David Pearson	Holman Moody

Most laps led
Driver	Bobby Isaac	K&K Insurance Racing
- Laps: 144

Winner
No. 21	Cale Yarborough	Wood Brothers Racing

Television in the United States
- Network: untelevised
- Announcers: none

The 1968 Peach State 200 was a NASCAR Grand National Series event that was held on November 3, 1968, at Jefco Speedway in Jefferson, Georgia.

The transition to purpose-built racecars began in the early 1960s and occurred gradually over that decade. Changes made to the sport by the late 1960s brought an end to the "strictly stock" vehicles of the 1950s.

== Race report ==
Two hundred laps were completed on an oval track spanning 0.500 miles (0.805 km). The race took one hour, seventeen minutes, and eleven seconds to completely finish. Notable speeds were: 77.737 miles per hour (125.106 km/h) for the average speed and 90.694 miles per hour (145.958 km/h) for the pole position speed. Five thousand and two hundred fans attended this race live.

Paul Dean Holt's streak of 18 DNF's in a row begins at this race, a streak which would last until the end of his career. In 85 starts, Holt only finished 22 races, which is an indication of the lack of reliability during the 1960s and the 1970s when the technology to provide reliable cars were at an extreme premium.

Cale Yarborough defeated Richard Petty by half a lap in his 1968 Mercury Cyclone. Bobby Isaac had a crash that made him commit a DNF in 9th place while Stan Meserve was the lowest finishing driver to actually complete the entire race (in 22nd place out of 29 competitors). All the competitors involved in this race were American citizens with no foreign-born participants. Crashes and problems with the stock car racing engine helped to play a part in knocking unwary drivers out of the race.

The winner of the race would enjoy his race winnings of $1,000 ($9,042 when considering inflation) USD while the bottom seven finishers were unpaid for racing up to 142 laps. Bobby Isaac would lead the most number of laps in the entire race (144 out of 200) in his 1968 Dodge Charger vehicle.

NASCAR's family-oriented heritage would shine at this race with the vast number of vehicles that were either owned by the driver himself or by a close relative of the driver. Ford vehicles would make up the majority of the racing grid while Chevrolet and Dodge made up a sizeable amount of the field. Notable crew chiefs at the race included Harry Hyde, Dale Inman, Frankie Scott, and Jake Elder.

Legendary racing team Holman Moody would enjoy a level of success at this event that would eventually be equaled at the other events throughout the late 1960s and early 1970s. Bill Ervin would be black flagged on the fourth lap of this race due to his vehicle being unable to comply with the minimum racing speeds necessary for NASCAR racing.

Don Tomberlin made his NASCAR debut here while Dexter Gainey and Stan Meserve would end their respective NASCAR careers after this event.

=== Qualifying ===
Grid	No.	Driver	Manufacturer	Owner
1	17	David Pearson	'68 Ford	Holman-Moody Racing
2	71	Bobby Isaac	'68 Dodge	Nord Krauskopf
3	21	Cale Yarborough	'68 Mercury	Wood Brothers
4	84	G.C. Spencer	'68 Ford	Roy Trantham
5	14	Bobby Allison	'68 Plymouth	Tom Friedkin
6	48	James Hylton	'68 Dodge	James Hylton
7	43	Richard Petty	'68 Plymouth	Petty Enterprises
8	4	John Sears	'66 Ford	L.G. DeWitt
9	39	Friday Hassler	'66 Chevrolet	Red Sharp
10	56	LeeRoy Yarbrough	'67 Mercury	Lyle Stelter
11	64	Elmo Langley	'66 Ford	Elmo Langley / Henry Woodfield
12	06	Neil Castles	'67 Plymouth	Neil Castles
13	25	Jabe Thomas	'67 Ford	Don Robertson
14	96	Don Tomberlin	'66 Ford	Roy Buckner
15	34	Wendell Scott	'66 Ford	Wendell Scott
16	5	Earl Brooks	'67 Ford	Don Robertson
17	8	Ed Negre	'67 Ford	Ed Negre
18	52	Dexter Gainey	'66 Ford	Elmer Buxton
19	20	Clyde Lynn	'66 Ford	Clyde Lynn
20	45	Cecil Gordon	'68 Ford	Bill Seifert
21	80	E.J. Trivette	'66 Chevrolet	E.C. Reid
22	70	J.D. McDuffie	'67 Buick	J.D. McDuffie
23	19	Henley Gray	'68 Ford	Henley Gray
24	47	Bill Seifert	'68 Ford	Bill Seifert
25	01	Paul Dean Holt	'67 Ford	Dennis Holt
26	09	Stan Meserve	'66 Chevrolet	Roy Tyner
27	57	Ervin Pruitt	'67 Dodge	Ervin Pruitt
28	31	Bill Ervin	'66 Ford	Newman Long
29	9	Roy Tyner	'67 Pontiac	Roy Tyner

== Finishing order ==
Section reference:

1. Cale Yarborough (No. 21)
2. Richard Petty (No. 43)
3. David Pearson† (No. 17)
4. James Hylton (No. 48)
5. LeeRoy Yarbrough† (No. 56)
6. John Sears† (No. 4)
7. Friday Hassler† (No. 39)
8. Elmo Langley† (No. 64)
9. Bobby Isaac*† (No. 71)
10. Neil Castles (No. 06)
11. Clyde Lynn† (No. 20)
12. Jabe Thomas† (No. 25)
13. J.D. McDuffie† (No. 70)
14. Wendell Scott† (No. 34)
15. Don Tomberlin (No. 96)
16. Henley Grey (No. 19)
17. E.J. Trivette (No. 80)
18. Bill Seifert (No. 47)
19. Cecil Gordon† (No. 45)
20. Ed Negre (No. 8)
21. Ervin Pruitt (No. 57)
22. Stan Meserve (No. 09)
23. Paul Dean Holt* (No. 01)
24. Dexter Gainey* (No. 52)
25. Earl Brooks*† (No. 5)
26. Roy Tyner*† (No. 9)
27. Bobby Allison* (No. 14)
28. G.C. Spencer*† (No. 84)
29. Bill Ervin* (No. 31)

† signifies that the driver is known to be deceased
* Driver failed to finish race

== Timeline ==
Section reference:

- Lap 4: Bill Ervin's vehicle was black flagged for disobeying the rules.
- Lap 28: Oil pressure problems ultimately forced G.C. Spencer out of the race.
- Lap 64: Bobby Allison's vehicle developed a problematic engine.
- Lap 71: Engine problems forced Roy Tyner to exit the race.
- Lap 74: Earl Brooks had a terminal crash, forcing him to exit the race.
- Lap 101: Dexter Gainey had a terminal crash, causing his premature exit from the race.
- Lap 142: Ignition problems forced Paul Dean Holt to end his race day.
- Lap 191: Bobby Isaac had a terminal crash, ending his NASCAR race day a bit too soon.

Preceded by 1968 American 500	NASCAR Grand National Season; 1968-69	Succeeded by 1969 Georgia 500

Preceded by 1967 Western North Carolina 500	NASCAR season-ending races 1949-present	Succeeded by 1969 Texas 500
