= 1969 Georgia 500 (November 1968) =

Auto race held at Middle Georgia Raceway in 1969

Race details
- Race 1 of 54 in the 1969 NASCAR Grand National Series season
- Date: November 17, 1968; 56 years ago
- Official name: Georgia 500
- Location: Middle Georgia Raceway, Byron, Georgia
- Course: Permanent racing facility
- Course length: 0.882 km (0.548 miles)
- Distance: 500 laps, 227 mi (441 km)
- Weather: Temperatures reaching of 73.9 °F (23.3 °C); wind speeds of 14 miles per hour (23 km/h)
- Average speed: 81.079 miles per hour (130.484 km/h)
- Attendance: 6,000

Pole position
| Driver | David Pearson | Holman Moody |

Most laps led
| Driver | Richard Petty | Petty Enterprises |
- Laps: 362

Winner
| No. 43 | Richard Petty | Petty Enterprises |

Television in the United States
- Network: untelevised
- Announcers: none

The 1969 Georgia 500 was a NASCAR Grand National Series event that was held on November 17, 1968, at Middle Georgia Raceway in Byron, Georgia.

The transition to purpose-built racecars began in the early 1960s and occurred gradually over that decade. Changes made to the sport by the late 1960s brought an end to the "strictly stock" vehicles of the 1950s.

== Race report ==
Thirty drivers qualified for this 500-lap racing event that took three hours and eight minutes to complete. Most of the field was driving vehicles made by Ford. J.D. McDuffie ended up becoming the last-place finisher due to a problem with his engine on lap 20. Ed Negre was the lowest finishing driver to complete the race regardless of being 206 laps behind the drivers on the lead lap. Six thousand excited NASCAR fans were eager to see Richard Petty defeat David Pearson by a margin of five seconds.

J.D. McDuffie's vehicle developed engine problems on lap 20. Jabe Thomas's vehicle developed similar issues on lap 26. An oil leak took Bill Champion out of the race on lap 81 while Don Tomberlin's engine stopped working normally on lap 90. The rear end of Don Tarr's vehicle became dangerously loose on lap 94. Driveshaft problems relegated Darel Dieringer to the sidelines on lap 119. E.J. Trivette managed to overheat his vehicle on lap 140. Ervin Pruitt no longer had a safe rear end for his vehicle on lap 162. Earl Brooks inflicted terminal damage on his vehicle on lap 189. G.C. Spencer lost the rear end of his vehicle on lap 210. Wayne Smith fell out with engine failure on lap 222.

Bobby Allison's vehicle no longer had a rear end on lap 252; forcing his exit from the race. Engine problems forced Bobby Isaac out of the race on lap 315 while a terminal crash took LeeRoy Yarbrough out of the race on lap 316. Friday Hassler's engine problems were unfortunate enough to kick him out of the race on lap 476 with a "fortunate" sixth-place finish.

From the halfway point (lap 251) to the end of the event, Petty and Pearson didn't allow the lead to escape their collective grasps. David Pearson, Bobby Isaac, and Bobby Allison all dominated the opening 100 laps of this racing event. The average racing speed was 85.121 miles per hour (136.989 km/h); which was overshadowed by David Pearson's solo qualifying speed of 95.472 miles per hour (153.647 km/h). Thankfully, this would be the final time that NASCAR followed the old tradition of starting the season in November.

Notable crew chiefs for the race were Harry Hyde, Dale Inman, Mario Rossi, Dick Hutcherson, and John Hill. Individual driver earnings from this racing event ranged from the winner's share of $3,500 ($31,647 when considering inflation) to the lowest possible earnings of $150 ($1,356 when considering inflation).

Organizers were authorized to hand over a grand total of $16,935 for all the qualifying drivers ($153,128 when considering inflation).

=== Qualifying ===
| Grid | No. | Driver | Manufacturer | Owner |
|---|---|---|---|---|
| 1 | 17 | David Pearson | '68 Ford | Holman-Moody Racing |
| 2 | 71 | Bobby Isaac | '68 Dodge | Nord Krauskopf |
| 3 | 14 | Bobby Allison | '68 Plymouth | Tom Friedkin |
| 4 | 22 | Darel Dieringer | '68 Plymouth | Mario Rossi |
| 5 | 43 | Richard Petty | '68 Plymouth | Petty Enterprises |
| 6 | 48 | James Hylton | '68 Dodge | James Hylton |
| 7 | 39 | Friday Hassler | '66 Chevrolet | Red Sharp |
| 8 | 64 | Elmo Langley | '66 Ford | Elmo Langley / Henry Woodfield |
| 9 | 49 | G.C. Spencer | '67 Plymouth | G.C. Spencer |
| 10 | 56 | LeeRoy Yarborough | '67 Mercury | Lyle Stelter |
| 11 | 10 | Bill Champion | '66 Ford | Bill Champion |
| 12 | 4 | John Sears | '66 Ford | L.G. DeWitt |
| 13 | 8 | Ed Negre | '67 Ford | Ed Negre |
| 14 | 96 | Don Tomberlin | '66 Ford | Roy Buckner |
| 15 | 34 | Wendell Scott | '66 Ford | Wendell Scott |
| 16 | 26 | Jabe Thomas | '67 Ford | Don Robertson |
| 17 | 47 | Bill Seifert | '68 Ford | Bill Seifert |
| 18 | 80 | E.J. Trivette | '66 Chevrolet | E.C. Reid |
| 19 | 46 | Roy Mayne | '66 Chevrolet | Tom Hunter |
| 20 | 76 | Ben Arnold | '66 Ford | Don Culpepper |
| 21 | 06 | Neil Castles | '66 Plymouth | Neil Castles |
| 22 | 5 | Earl Brooks | '67 Ford | Don Robertson |
| 23 | 57 | Ervin Pruett | '67 Dodge | Ervin Pruett |
| 24 | 0 | Don Tarr | '66 Chevrolet | Don Tarr |
| 25 | 19 | Henley Gray | '68 Ford | Henley Gray |
| 26 | 38 | Wayne Smith | '68 Chevrolet | Archie Smith |
| 27 | 93 | Walson Gardner | '67 Ford | Walson Gardner |
| 28 | 70 | J.D. McDuffie | '67 Buick | J.D. McDuffie |
| 29 | 45 | Cecil Gordon | '68 Ford | Bill Seifert |
| 30 | 9 | Roy Tyner | '67 Pontiac | Roy Tyner |

== Finishing order ==
Section reference:

1. Richard Petty (No. 43)
2. David Pearson† (No. 17)
3. James Hylton (No. 48)
4. Elmo Langley† (No. 64)
5. John Sears† (No. 4)
6. Friday Hassler*† (No. 39)
7. Neil Castles (No. 06)
8. Bill Seifert (No. 47)
9. Henley Gray (No. 19)
10. Ben Arnold (No. 76)
11. Cecil Gordon† (No. 45)
12. Roy Mayne† (No. 46)
13. Wendell Scott† (No. 34)
14. Walson Gardner (No. 93)
15. Roy Tyner† (No. 9)
16. LeeRoy Yarbrough*† (No. 56)
17. Bobby Isaac*† (No. 71)
18. Ed Negre (No. 8)
19. Bobby Allison* (No. 14)
20. Wayne Smith* (No. 38)
21. G.C. Spencer*† (No. 49)
22. Earl Brooks*† (No. 5)
23. Ervin Pruitt* (No. 57)
24. E.J. Trivette* (No. 80)
25. Darel Dieringer*† (No. 22)
26. Don Tarr* (No. 0)
27. Don Tomberlin* (No. 96)
28. Bill Champion*† (No. 10)
29. Jabe Thomas* (No. 25)
30. J.D. McDuffie*† (No. 70)

† signifies that the driver is known to be deceased
* Driver failed to finish race

== Timeline ==
Section reference:

David Pearson
Bobby Isaac
David Pearson
Bobby Allison
Bobby Isaac
Bobby Allison
Richard Petty
Bobby Allison
Richard Petty
Richard Petty
David Pearson
Richard Petty
│
1
│
16
│
31
│
46
│
61
│
76
│
91
│
106
│
121
│
136
│
151
│
166
│
181
│
196
│
211
│
226
│
241
│
256
│
271
│
286
│
301
│
316
│
331
│
346
│
361
│
376
│
391
│
406
│
421
│
436
│
451
│
466
│
481
│
496

| Preceded by 1968 Peach State 200 | NASCAR Grand National Series Season; 1968-69 | Succeeded by 1969 Alabama 200 |

| Preceded by none | Georgia 500 races 1969 | Succeeded by November 1969 |

| Preceded by 1968 American 500 | Richard Petty's Career Wins; 1960-1984 | Succeeded by 1969 Motor Trend 500 |
