= 1969 National 500 =

Auto race held at Charlotte Motor Speedway in 1969

Race details
- Race 48 of 54 in the 1969 NASCAR Grand National Series season
- Layout of Charlotte Motor Speedway
- Date: October 12, 1969
- Official name: National 500
- Location: Charlotte Motor Speedway, Concord, North Carolina
- Course: Permanent racing facility
- Course length: 1.500 miles (2.414 km)
- Distance: 334 laps, 501 mi (804 km)
- Weather: Temperatures of 82 °F (28 °C); wind speeds of 6 miles per hour (9.7 km/h)
- Average speed: 131.271 miles per hour (211.260 km/h)
- Attendance: 57,000

Pole position
Driver	Cale Yarborough	Wood Brothers

Most laps led
Driver	Donnie Allison	Banjo Matthews
- Laps: 161

Winner
No. 27	Donnie Allison	Banjo Matthews

Television in the United States
- Network: ABC
- Announcers: Jim McKay; Chris Economaki

The 1969 National 500 was a NASCAR Grand National Series stock car race that was held on October 12, 1969, at Charlotte Motor Speedway in Concord, North Carolina. This race is still being held in today's Monster Energy NASCAR Cup Series as the 'Bank of America 500'.

The transition to purpose-built racecars began in the early 1960s and occurred gradually over that decade. Changes made to the sport by the late 1960s brought an end to the "strictly stock" vehicles of the 1950s.

== Race report ==
It took three hours and forty-two minutes to complete the race. Nine cautions slowed the race for 50 laps. Donnie Allison defeated Bobby Allison by sixteen seconds. Fifty thousand people attended this race to see speeds averaging 131.271 miles per hour (211.260 km/h) and Cale Yarborough earning his pole position by qualifying with a speed of 162.162 miles per hour (260.974 km/h). There was a consolation race for the drivers who failed to qualify, only three cars finished that race; the winner was J.C. Spradley in a 1967 Chevrolet Chevelle.

Other notable drivers in this race include: A. J. Foyt, Coo Coo Marlin, Cale Yarborough, J.D. McDuffie, Wendell Scott, and Richard Petty. This would become the forty-eighth race sanctioned by NASCAR out of the 54 in 1969. The 1969 NASCAR Grand National season would later mark its conclusion with the 1969 Texas 500 on December 7, 1969, with David Pearson emerging as the eventual champion for the year.

The winner's purse was considered to be $20,280 ($178,048 when considering inflation). Jim Lineberger would make his only NASCAR Cup Series appearance this event while Bob Cooper would bow out of professional stock car racing after this race. This was the only career start for Wayne Gillette where his vehicle qualified for the race and made it to the finish; Gillette would fail to qualify in two other races in the NASCAR Grand National Cup Series.

Notable crew chiefs for this race were Herb Nab, Harry Hyde, Dale Inman, Banjo Matthews, Glen Wood, Dick Hutcherson and Cotton Owens.

=== Qualifying ===
Grid	No.	Driver	Manufacturer	Owner
1	21	Cale Yarborough	'69 Mercury	Wood Brothers
2	43	Richard Petty	'69 Ford	Petty Enterprises
3	27	Donnie Allison	'69 Ford	Banjo Matthews
4	98	LeeRoy Yarbrough	'69 Ford	Junior Johnson
5	6	Buddy Baker	'69 Dodge	Cotton Owens
6	22	Bobby Allison	'69 Dodge	Mario Rossi
7	99	Charlie Glotzbach	'69 Dodge	Ray Nichels
8	17	David Pearson	'69 Ford	Holman-Moody Racing
9	71	Bobby Isaac	'69 Dodge	Nord Krauskopf
10	30	Dave Marcis	'69 Dodge	Milt Lunda
11	3	Jim Vandiver	'69 Dodge	Ray Fox
12	1	A.J. Foyt	'69 Ford	Jack Bowsher
13	32	Dick Brooks	'69 Plymouth	Dick Brooks
14	67	Buddy Arrington	'69 Dodge	Buddy Arrington
15	4	John Sears	'69 Ford	L.G. DeWitt

== Finishing order ==
Section reference:

1. Donnie Allison
2. Bobby Allison
3. Buddy Baker†
4. Charlie Glotzbach
5. David Pearson†
6. Dick Brooks
7. Neil Castles
8. Friday Hassler
9. Don Tarr
10. John Sears*
11. James Hylton
12. Wayne Smith
13. Elmo Langley
14. Hoss Ellington
15. John Kennedy
16. Bill Seifert
17. Wendell Scott
18. Ben Arnold
19. Cecil Gordon
20. Dub Simpson
21. Henley Gray
22. Bill Champion
23. Wayne Gillette
24. J.D. McDuffie*
25. Cale Yarborough*
26. Jabe Thomas
27. Richard Petty*
28. Dave Marcis*
29. Earl Brooks*
30. G.C. Spencer*
31. Roy Tyner*
32. Sonny Hutchins*
33. E.J. Trivette*
34. Jim Lineberger*
35. Buddy Young*
36. Buddy Arrington*
37. Richard Brickhouse*
38. LeeRoy Yarbrough*
39. Coo Coo Marlin*
40. A. J. Foyt*
41. Bobby Isaac*
42. Bill Dennis*
43. Jim Vandiver*
44. Bob Cooper*
45. Frank Warren*

* Driver failed to finish race

== Timeline ==
Section reference:

- Start of race: Donnie Allison officially began the race with the pole position.
- Lap 9: Caution due to Buddy Young's accident on turn two, ended on lap 13.
- Lap 25: Caution due to engine problems, ended on lap 31.
- Lap 32: Buddy Baker took over the lead from Dave Marcis.
- Lap 55: Bob Cooper managed to lose the rear end of his vehicle.
- Lap 64: Jim Vandiver just could not steer his vehicle properly anymore.
- Lap 69: Bill Dennis managed to destroy his vehicle's engine by racing at excessively high speeds.
- Lap 81: Bobby Isaac's engine could not handle the pressures of high-speed racing anymore.
- Lap 88: A wheel bearing came off A.J. Foyt's vehicle, giving him a miserable 40th-place finish.
- Lap 90: Coo Coo Marlin's race engine no longer worked properly.
- Lap 94: LeeRoy Yarbrough's engine had seen better laps around this time.
- Lap 95: Richard Brickhouse's engine became as useless as a brick, eliminating him from the race.
- Lap 98: Bobby Allison took over the lead from Buddy Baker.
- Lap 104: Caution due to engine problems, ended on lap 106.
- Lap 109: The rear end of Buddy Young's vehicle came off in a relatively unsafe manner.
- Lap 114: Caution due to debris, ended on lap 118.
- Lap 126: Caution due to Jim Lineberger's accident on turn two, ended on lap 131.
- Lap 131: Jim Lineberger had a terminal crash.
- Lap 175: Sonny Hutchins' engine stopped working around this time.
- Lap 191: G.C. Spencer blew his vehicle's engine while racing at high speeds.
- Lap 195: Caution due to engine problems, ended on lap 199.
- Lap 201: Earl Brooks' vehicle developed engine problems.
- Lap 205: Caution due to Roy Tyner's oil spill on turn one, ended on lap 211.
- Lap 217: Dave Marcis blew his vehicle's engine while racing at high speeds.
- Lap 240: Caution due to engine problems, ended on lap 243.
- Lap 247: Cale Yarborough took over the lead from Donnie Allison.
- Lap 260: Caution due to engine problems, ended on lap 267.
- Lap 277: J.D. McDuffie had problems dealing with his vehicle's clutch.
- Lap 285: Donnie Allison took over the lead from Bobby Allison.
- Lap 315: John Sears had problems with his vehicle's engine.
- Finish: Donnie Allison was officially declared the winner of the event.

Preceded by 1969 Wilkes 400	NASCAR Grand National Series season 1969	Succeeded by 1969 untitled race at Savannah Speedway

Preceded by 1968	National 500 races 1969	Succeeded by 1970
