= 1968 Columbia 200 =

Auto race held at Columbia Speedway in 1968

Race details
- Race 10 of 49 in the 1968 NASCAR Grand National Series season
- Date: April 18, 1968; 56 years ago
- Official name: Columbia 200
- Location: Columbia Speedway, Columbia, South Carolina
- Course: Permanent racing facility
- Course length: 0.804 km (0.500 miles)
- Distance: 200 laps, 100 mi (160 km)
- Weather: Very hot with temperatures of 84 °F (29 °C); wind speeds of 10.24 miles per hour (16.48 km/h)
- Average speed: 71.358 miles per hour (114.840 km/h)

Pole position
Driver	Richard Petty	Petty Enterprises

Most laps led
Driver	Bobby Isaac	K&K Insurance Racing
- Laps: 186

Winner
No. 37	Bobby Isaac	K&K Insurance Racing

The 1968 Columbia 200 was a NASCAR Grand National Series stock car race that was held on April 18, 1968, at Columbia Speedway in Columbia, South Carolina.

== Background ==
Columbia Speedway was an oval racetrack located in Cayce, a suburb of Columbia, South Carolina. It was the site of auto races for NASCAR's top series from 1951 through 1971. For most of its history, the racing surface was dirt. The races in April and August 1970 were two of the final three Grand National races ever held on a dirt track.

The track was paved before hosting its last two Grand National races in 1971.

While Columbia Speedway was shut down to cars in 1979, noise complaints, it reopened as a velodrome in 2001.

== Race report ==
Two hundred laps took place on a dirt track spanning 0.500 miles (0.805 km) per lap; for a grand total of 100.0 miles (160.9 km). The race lasted one hour and twenty-four minutes with five cautions being handed out by NASCAR officials.

Bobby Isaac would defeat Charlie Glotzbach by less than one lap in front of 6500 live spectators (thus recording Nord Krauskopf's first win as a NASCAR team owner. After this race, no vehicle with the number 37 would even win a NASCAR Grand National Series race ever again.

While the average speed of the race was 71.358 miles per hour (114.840 km/h), Richard Petty would qualify for the race with a pole position speed of 75.282 miles per hour (121.155 km/h). Out of the 23-car field, 22 cars would be driven by American-born drivers while the other vehicle would be driven by Canadian driver Frog Fagan. Bob Cooper would acquire the race's last-place finish due to an alternator issue on lap 42. Until 1972, Daytona 500 qualifiers were valid for the championship, Isaac would get his second win of the season at this race.

Until 1972, Daytona 500 qualifiers were valid for the championship, so Bobby Isaac got his second win of his NASCAR Grand National Cup Series career. Meanwhile, Mopar (Dodge and Plymouth) would have its vehicles finish in the top five. Total prize winnings handed out at the race was $4,490 ($40,599 when adjusted for inflation); with $1,000 being handed out to the winner ($9,042 when adjusted for inflation) while the last-place finisher not winning any money.

Notable crew chiefs at the race were Dale Inman, Harry Hyde, Frankie Scott, and Jake Elder.

=== Qualifying ===
Grid	No.	Driver	Manufacturer	Owner
1	43	Richard Petty	'68 Plymouth	Petty Enterprises
2	4	John Sears	'66 Ford	L.G. DeWitt
3	48	James Hylton	'67 Dodge	James Hylton
4	17	David Pearson	'68 Ford	Holman-Moody Racing
5	56	LeeRoy Yarbrough	'66 Ford	Lyle Stelter
6	37	Bobby Isaac	'67 Dodge	Nord Krauskopf
7	3	Buddy Baker	'67 Dodge	Ray Fox
8	02	Bob Cooper	'66 Chevrolet	Bob Cooper
9	06	Neil Castles	'67 Plymouth	Neil Castles
10	6	Charlie Glotzbach	'67 Dodge	Cotton Owens
11	88	Buck Baker	'67 Oldsmobile	Buck Baker
12	45	Bill Seifert	'66 Ford	Bill Seifert
13	64	Elmo Langley	'66 Ford	Elmo Langley / Henry Woodfield
14	25	Jabe Thomas	'67 Ford	Don Robertson
15	20	Clyde Lynn	'66 Ford	Clyde Lynn
16	34	Wendell Scott	'66 Ford	Wendell Scott
17	19	Henley Gray	'66 Ford	Henley Gray
18	9	Roy Tyner	'67 Pontiac	Roy Tyner
19	8	Ed Negre	'67 Ford	Ed Negre
20	31	Paul Dean Holt	'66 Ford	Newman Long
21	95	Frog Fagan	'66 Ford	Henley Gray
22	76	Ben Arnold	'66 Ford	Don Culpepper
23	09	Bill Vanderhoff	'66 Chevrolet	Roy Tyner

== Finishing order ==
Section reference:

1. Bobby Isaac† (No. 37)
2. Charlie Glotzbach (No. 6)
3. James Hylton (No. 48)
4. Buddy Baker (No. 3)
5. Richard Petty (No. 43)
6. John Sears† (No. 4)
7. David Pearson† (No. 17)
8. Elmo Langley† (No. 64)
9. LeeRoy Yarbrough† (No. 56)
10. Neil Castles (No. 06)
11. Clyde Lynn† (No. 20)
12. Buck Baker† (No. 88)
13. Wendell Scott† (No. 34)
14. Roy Tyner† (No. 9)
15. Jabe Thomas (No. 25)
16. Henley Gray (No. 19)
17. Bill Vanderhoff* (No. 09)
18. Bill Seifert* (No. 45)
19. Frog Fagan*† (No. 95)
20. Ben Arnold* (No. 76)
21. Paul Dean Holt* (No. 31)
22. Ed Negre* (No. 8)
23. Bob Cooper* (No. 02)

* Driver failed to finish race
† signifies that the driver is known to be deceased

== Timeline ==
Section reference:

- Start of race: Richard Petty started the race with the pole position.
- Lap 15: Bobby Isaac took over the lead from Richard Petty.
- Lap 42: The alternator on Bob Cooper's vehicle became problematic, forcing him out of the race.
- Lap 51: Ed Negre developed problems with his vehicle's rear end, causing him to leave the race.
- Lap 52: Vibrations could be felt on Paul Dean Holt's vehicle, ending his day on the track.
- Lap 56: Ben Arnold's vehicle also had some vibration problems, forcing him to leave the event.
- Lap 62: Frog Fagan would have problems with his vehicle's engine, causing him to exit from the race prematurely.
- Lap 63: Bill Seifert's engine became problematic; making him leave the race without properly finishing it.
- Lap 78: The rear end of Bill Vanderhoff's vehicle gave out, causing him to exit the race early.
- Finish: Bobby Isaac was officially declared the winner of the event.

Preceded by 1968 Greenville 200	NASCAR Grand National Series Season; 1968	Succeeded by 1968 Gwyn Staley 400
