= 1970 Daytona 500 =

Auto race run in Florida in 1970

Race details
- Race 4 of 48 in the 1970 NASCAR Grand National Series season
- 1970 Daytona 500 program cover
- Date: February 22, 1970
- Location: Daytona International Speedway; Daytona Beach, Florida, U.S.
- Course: Permanent racing facility 2.5 mi (4.023 km)
- Distance: 200 laps, 500 mi (804.672 km)
- Weather: Temperatures reaching up to 64.9 °F (18.3 °C); wind speeds approaching 10.1 miles per hour (16.3 km/h)
- Average speed: 149.601 miles per hour (240.759 km/h)

Pole position
Driver	Cale Yarborough	Wood Brothers Racing

Most laps led
Driver	David Pearson	Holman Moody
- Laps: 82

Winner
No. 40	Pete Hamilton	Petty Enterprises

Television in the United States
- Network: ABC's Wide World of Sports
- Announcers: Keith Jackson; Chris Economaki

The 1970 Daytona 500 was a NASCAR Grand National Series race held on February 22, 1970, at Daytona International Speedway in Daytona Beach, Florida.

First Daytona 500 starts for Joe Frasson, Dick Trickle, Tommy Gale, Ron Keselowski, and Jim Vandiver. Only Daytona 500 start for Butch Hirst, Paul Feldner, Ron Grana, and Leonard Blanchard. Last Daytona 500 starts for Richard Brickhouse, Roy Mayne, and Dr. Don Tarr.

== Summary ==
NASCAR's modern era would commence with this race. Winged, aerodynamic cars built specifically for high-speed superspeedway racing such as the Plymouth Superbird and Ford Torino Talladega made their debut. Pete Hamilton, hired by Petty Enterprises shortly before the season, won the race in the #40 Plymouth Superbird just three car lengths over David Pearson, after passing him with nine laps to go. It was the first win for the new Plymouth Superbird.

This race would last 200 minutes, with an audience of 103,800 people watching. 24 lead changes were made with an average green flag run of 22 laps. 23% of the race was held under a yellow flag; blown engines were the primary culprit behind the caution periods.

On lap 7, Cecil Gordon and Richard Petty blew their engines. Jim Vandiver blew his engine on lap 15 while Cale Yarborough would do the same thing on lap 32. A. J. Foyt would also blow his engine on lap 58 while Buddy Arrington wrecked his vehicle on lap 77 by crashing it into a wall. The final caution the race came when Dick Brooks blew his engine on lap 181.

Buddy Arrington had a brand new #5 Dodge Daytona for the 1970 season but totaled it out here with a hard crash at full speed into the outside wall. He hit the wall so hard the big wing on the Charger actually broke with its top cross bar ripping off the car then flying 60 feet down the track spinning in the air.

Following the wreck NASCAR mandated that all of the wing cars would have to have a steel cable to anchor the wing to the frame to avoid a repeat of this incident. John Sears actually drove under the flying piece of Arrington's wing as it soared over the track. He was apparently quite scared it was going to hit him. Arrington later said this was the worst wreck of his entire NASCAR career; as it left him with several broken ribs and a ruptured spleen. The Daytona 500 was not a race that Buddy Arrington would finish in good form; finishing in 29th place after qualifying in 32nd place. Arrington eventually got back on the track a few months later at the 1970 Rebel 400.

David Pearson tried to slingshot Pete Hamilton in the last turn, but got very loose and finished second.

== Race results ==
Pos	Grid	No.	Driver	Entrant	Manufacturer	Laps	Winnings	Laps led	Time/Status
1	9	40	Pete Hamilton	Petty Enterprises	1970 Plymouth	200	$44,850	13	3:20:32
2	31	17	David Pearson	Holman-Moody	1969 Ford	200	$17,650	82	+3 car lengths
3	6	22	Bobby Allison	Mario Rossi	1969 Dodge	199	$9,950	6	+1 Lap
4	4	99	Charlie Glotzbach	Ray Nichels	1969 Dodge	199	$5,850	36	+1 Lap
5	3	71	Bobby Isaac	Nord Krauskopf	1969 Dodge	198	$4,450	30	+2 Laps
6	10	14	Richard Brickhouse	Bill Ellis	1970 Plymouth	198	$3,175	0	+2 Laps
7	34	59	Jim Hurtubise	Tom Pistone	1970 Ford	197	$2,575	0	+3 Laps
8	15	7	Ramo Stott	Ramo Stott	1970 Plymouth	194	$2,525	2	+6 Laps
9	5	98	LeeRoy Yarbrough	Junior Johnson & Associates	1969 Ford	193	$2,175	1	+7 Laps
10	33	30	Dave Marcis	Marcis Auto Racing	1969 Dodge	193	$2,025	0	+7 Laps
11	12	96	Ray Elder	Fred Elder	1969 Dodge	189	$1,925	0	+11 Laps
12	35	06	Neil Castles	Neil Castles	1969 Dodge	188	$1,825	0	+12 Laps
13	8	55	Tiny Lund	John McConnell	1969 Dodge	187	$1,860	3	Engine
14	14	88	Benny Parsons	Benny Parsons	1969 Ford	187	$1,725	0	+13 Laps
15	16	39	Friday Hassler	James Hanley	1969 Chevrolet	187	$1,675	0	+13 Laps
16	22	46	Roy Mayne	Tom Hunter	1969 Chevrolet	184	$1,650	0	+16 Laps
17	27	86	John Sears	Dennis Gallion	1969 Dodge	184	$1,620	0	+16 Laps
18	40	07	Coo Coo Marlin	H.B. Cunningham	1969 Chevrolet	182	$1,610	0	+18 Laps
19	13	32	Dick Brooks	Dick Brooks	1970 Plymouth	181	$1,700	0	Engine
20	24	79	Frank Warren	Frank Warren	1969 Plymouth	181	$1,590	0	+19 Laps
21	26	82	Joe Frasson	Joe Frasson	1970 Dodge	175	$1,675	0	+25 Laps
22	21	23	James Hylton	Don Robertson	1969 Plymouth	174	$1,190	0	+26 Laps
23	39	89	Butch Hirst	Morris Davis	1969 Ford	172	$1,185	0	+28 Laps
24	20	93	Paul Feldner	Jack Janos	1969 Dodge	167	$1,180	0	+33 Laps
25	19	25	Jabe Thomas	Don Robertson	1969 Plymouth	140	$1,175	0	+60 Laps
26	36	09	Dick Trickle	Fran Kelly	1969 Ford	131	$1,170	0	Head gasket
27	2	6	Buddy Baker	Cotton Owens	1969 Dodge	122	$2,265	1	Ignition
28	25	64	Elmo Langley	Elmo Langley	1969 Mercury	109	$1,160	0	Ignition
29	32	5	Buddy Arrington	Buddy Arrington	1969 Dodge	77	$1,255	0	Crash
30	18	05	Ron Grana	C. J. Grana	1969 Ford	72	$1,150	0	Engine
31	29	03	Tommy Gale	Walt Valerio	1969 Mercury	70	$1,115	0	Engine
32	28	11	A. J. Foyt	Jack Bowsher	1969 Ford	58	$1,240	0	Engine
33	37	95	Leonard Blanchard	Leonard Blanchard	1970 Ford	57	$1,135	0	Overheating
34	38	62	Ron Keselowski	John Keselowski	1969 Dodge	46	$1,230	0	Valve
35	7	27	Donnie Allison	Banjo Matthews	1969 Ford	41	$1,225	0	Engine
36	23	37	Don Tarr	Don Tarr	1969 Dodge	41	$1,120	0	Steering
37	1	21	Cale Yarborough	Wood Brothers Racing	1969 Mercury	31	$7,465	26	Engine
38	17	3	Jim Vandiver	Ray Fox	1969 Dodge	15	$1,110	0	Clutch
39	11	43	Richard Petty	Petty Enterprises	1970 Plymouth	7	$1,105	0	Engine
40	30	24	Cecil Gordon	Cecil Gordon	1968 Ford	7	$1,100	0	A-frame
