= 1968 Rebel 400 =

Auto race run in South Carolina in 1968

Race details
- Race 15 of 49 in the 1968 NASCAR Grand National Series season
- Layout of Darlington Raceway
- Date: May 11, 1968
- Official name: Rebel 400
- Location: Darlington Raceway (Darlington, South Carolina)
- Course: Permanent racing facility
- Course length: 1.366 miles (2.198 km)
- Distance: 291 laps, 401.3 mi (706.7 km)
- Weather: Temperatures of 82.9 °F (28.3 °C); wind speeds of 12 miles per hour (19 km/h)
- Average speed: 132.699 miles per hour (213.558 km/h)

Pole position
Driver	LeeRoy Yarbrough	Junior Johnson & Associates

Most laps led
Driver	David Pearson	Holman-Moody
- Laps: 131

Winner
No. 17	David Pearson	Holman-Moody

Television in the United States
- Network: ABC's Wide World of Sports
- Announcers: Pre-recorded (no announcers)

The 1968 Rebel 400 was a NASCAR Grand National Series event that was held on May 11, 1968, at Darlington Raceway in Darlington, South Carolina.

== Summary ==
Two-hundred and ninety one laps were completed on the paved oval track spanning 1.375 miles (2.213 km) for a total of 400.1 miles (643.9 km). The time of the race was three hours and fifty-four seconds with a crowd of 22,500 attending. There were four cautions for twenty-three laps. David Pearson defeated Darel Dieringer in his 1968 Ford by eighteen seconds. Pearson took advantage of the NASCAR engine and weight rules for 1968 and used a 396 cid engine instead of the normal 427. At that time the car had to be 4,000 pounds with the 427 cid engine but only 3,707 pounds with the 396 cid engine. The lighter weight paid off as Pearson used less fuel and had fewer tire troubles than many of the other teams. Pearson would continue to use the 396 throughout the year.

Canadian racer Frog Fagan finished in 22nd place. The average speed was 132.699 miles per hour (213.558 km/h) while the pole position speed was 148.85 miles per hour (239.55 km/h). Other notable drivers included Wendell Scott, Richard Petty, Buddy Baker, Elmo Langley, and Roy Tyner. Out of the thirty-four drivers, fifteen of them did not finish the race.

Total winnings for the 1968 Rebel 400 were $53,455 ($494,906 when adjusted for inflation); first-place finisher Pearson earned $13,700 ($126,840 when adjusted for inflation) while last-place finisher Hess walked away with $460 ($4,259 when adjusted for inflation).

Lennie Waldo made his NASCAR Grand National Series debut in this event.

=== Qualifying ===
Grid	No.	Driver	Manufacturer	Speed
1	26	LeeRoy Yarbrough	'68 Ford	148.850
2	17	David Pearson	'68 Ford	148.751
3	22	Darel Dieringer	'68 Plymouth	148.419
4	29	Bobby Allison	'68 Ford	148.335
5	27	Donnie Allison	'68 Ford	147.821
6	3	Buddy Baker	'67 Dodge	147.254
7	16	Tiny Lund	'68 Mercury	147.188
8	14	Curtis Turner	'68 Plymouth	146.125
9	21	Cale Yarborough	'68 Mercury	147.470
10	6	Charlie Glotzbach	'68 Dodge	147.195

== Finishers ==
1. David Pearson
2. Darel Dieringer
3. Richard Petty
4. Buddy Baker† (highest finishing Dodge entry)
5. LeeRoy Yarbrough†
6. James Hylton
7. Bobby Isaac
8. John Sears
9. Bud Moore
10. Elmo Langley
11. Bill Champion
12. E.J. Trivette (highest finishing Chevrolet entry)
13. Wendell Scott†
14. Don Tarr*
15. Curtis Turner*
16. Earl Brooks
17. Henley Gray
18. Lennie Waldo
19. Clyde Lynn†
20. Cale Yarborough*
21. Paul Dean Holt
22. Frog Fagan
23. Bobby Allison*
24. Paul Goldsmith*
25. Stan Meserve*
26. Jabe Thomas*
27. Wayne Smith*
28. Charlie Glotzbach*
29. Donnie Allison*
30. Roy Tyner*
31. Ed Negre*
32. Tiny Lund*
33. Neil Castles*
34. Larry Hess* (only Rambler entry in the race)

* Driver failed to finish race

== Timeline ==
Section reference:

- Start: David Pearson had the first-class position as the green flag was waved.
- Lap 19: LeeRoy Yarbrough took over the lead from David Pearson.
- Lap 28: Buddy Baker took over the lead from LeeRoy Yarbrough.
- Lap 59: Cale Yarborough took over the lead from Buddy Baker.
- Lap 63: Paul Goldsmith took over the lead from Cale Yarborough.
- Lap 65: Buddy Baker took over the lead from Paul Goldsmith.
- Lap 91: Donnie Allison had an accident on turn four.
- Lap 108: Charlie Glotzbach took over the lead from Buddy Baker.
- Lap 116: Buddy Baker took over the lead from Charlie Glotzbach.
- Lap 158: David Pearson took over the lead from Buddy Baker.
- Lap 203: Bobby Allison spun his vehicle on turn two.
- Lap 205: Richard Petty took over the lead from David Pearson.
- Lap 219: David Pearson took over the lead from Richard Petty.
- Lap 231: Cale Yarborough blew his vehicle's engine.
- Lap 233: Richard Petty took over the lead from David Pearson.
- Lap 240: David Pearson took over the lead from Richard Petty.
- Lap 243: Curtis Turner blew his vehicle's engine.
- Finish: David Pearson was officially declared the winner of the event.

Preceded by 1968 Fireball 300	NASCAR Grand National Season; 1968	Succeeded by 1968 Beltsville 300
