= 1968 Fireball 300 =

Auto race held at Asheville-Weaverville Speedway in 1968

Race details
- Race 14 of 49 in the 1968 NASCAR Grand National Series season
- Date: May 5, 1968; 58 years ago
- Official name: Fireball 300
- Location: Asheville-Weaverville Speedway, Weaverville, North Carolina
- Course: Permanent racing facility
- Course length: 0.500 miles (0.804 km)
- Distance: 300 laps, 150 mi (241 km)
- Weather: Chilly with temperatures of 63 °F (17 °C); wind speeds of 15.9 miles per hour (25.6 km/h)
- Average speed: 75.167 miles per hour (120.970 km/h)

Pole position
| Driver | David Pearson | Holman-Moody |

Most laps led
| Driver | David Pearson | Holman-Moody |
- Laps: 299

Winner
| No. 17 | David Pearson | Holman-Moody |

Television in the United States
- Network: untelevised
- Announcers: none

The 1968 Fireball 300 was a NASCAR Grand National Series event that was held on May 5, 1968, at Asheville-Weaverville Speedway in Weaverville, North Carolina.

It had twenty-seven American competitors and one Canadian competitor (Frog Fagan). The entire race spanned a distance of 150 miles (240 km); the "300" portion of the race's name simply referred to the number of laps that were expected to be completed.

== Race report ==
This event lasted one hour and fifty-nine minutes over a paved oval track spanning 0.500 miles (0.805 km).

David Pearson, Bobby Isaac, Richard Petty, James Hylton, Elmo Langley, Clyde Lynn, Jabe Thomas, Frog Fagan, Henley Gray, and Stan Meserve were amongst the drivers who finished in the top ten. There were six cautions for forty-five laps and the margin of victory was more than two laps. The average speed of the race was 75.167 miles per hour (120.970 km/h) per hour while the pole speed was 89.708 miles per hour (144.371 km/h) per hour. Pearson was responsible for leading almost all the laps in the race. After this race, David Pearson moved past Roberts for 8th on the all-time wins list. A crowd of 7,800 people attended this racing event that took place on May 5, 1968, at the Asheville-Weaverville Speedway in the American community of Weaverville, North Carolina. Out of twenty-eight competitors, only ten managed to finish all 300 laps of the event.

Total winnings for this racing event was $6,900 ($63,883 when adjusted for inflation). making him the dominant driver in the event.

A bumper crop of multi-car "corporate" teams participated in the race because racing expenses have started to become prohibitively expensive for individuals to burden during the late 1960s. Few of the remaining independent teams included Margo Hamm's team, Neil Castles' team and the driver-owner Gene Black; whose day on the race track came to an abrupt end on the fourth lap due to a problem with his stock car engine.

Notable crew chiefs at this race were Harry Hyde, Dale Inman, Frankie Scott, Jake Elder, and Ray Hicks.

The transition to purpose-built racecars began in the early 1960s and occurred gradually over that decade. Changes made to the sport by the late 1960s brought an end to the "strictly stock" vehicles of the 1950s.

=== Qualifying ===
| Grid | No. | Driver | Manufacturer | Owner |
|---|---|---|---|---|
| 1 | 17 | David Pearson | '68 Ford | Holman-Moody |
| 2 | 43 | Richard Petty | '68 Plymouth | Petty Enterprises |
| 3 | 12 | Tom Pistone | '68 Mercury | Tom Pistone |
| 4 | 71 | Bobby Isaac | '67 Dodge | Nord Krauskopf |
| 5 | 4 | John Sears | '67 Ford | L.G. DeWitt |
| 6 | 49 | G.C. Spencer | '67 Plymouth | G.C. Spencer |
| 7 | 48 | James Hylton | '67 Dodge | James Hylton |
| 8 | 75 | Gene Black | '66 Dodge | Gene Black |
| 9 | 3 | Buddy Baker | '67 Dodge | Ray Fox |
| 10 | 76 | Roy Tyner | '66 Ford | Don Culpepper |

== Finishing order ==
Section reference:

1. David Pearson† (No. 17)
2. Bobby Isaac† (No. 71)
3. Richard Petty (No. 43)
4. James Hylton (No. 48)
5. Elmo Langley† (No. 64)
6. Clyde Lynn† (No. 20)
7. Jabe Thomas† (No. 25)
8. Frog Fagan† (No. 95)
9. Henley Gray (No. 19)
10. Stan Meserve (No. 51)
11. Roy Tyner*† (No. 76)
12. Pete Hamilton* (No. 5)
13. John Sears*† (No. 4)
14. Neil Castles* (No. 06)
15. Bill Seifert* (No. 45)
16. Earl Brooks*† (No. 28)
17. Max Ledbetter* (No. 46)
18. Buddy Baker*† (No. 3)
19. J.D. McDuffie*† (No. 70)
20. Tom Pistone* (No. 12)
21. Walson Gardener* (No. 93)
22. Don Tarr* (No. 0)
23. Wendell Scott*† (No. 34)
24. Buck Baker*† (No. 88)
25. Jack Ingram* (No. 08)
26. Paul Dean Holt* (No. 01)
27. G.C. Spencer*† (No. 49)
28. Gene Black*† (No. 75)

* Driver failed to finish race
† signifies that the driver is known to be deceased

== Timeline ==
Section reference:

- Start of race: David Pearson began the event with the pole position.
- Lap 4: Gene Black's vehicle developed a problematic engine.
- Lap 13: G.C. Spencer had to leave the race due to a faulty suspension system on his vehicle.
- Lap 15: Paul Dean Holt fell out with engine failure.
- Lap 25: Jack Ingram fell out with engine failure.
- Lap 51: Buck Baker would lose his vehicle's rear end, forcing his exit due to safety reasons.
- Lap 61: Wendell Scott's engine managed to blow while he was racing.
- Lap 63: Oil pressure issues forced Don Tarr out of the event.
- Lap 74: Walson Gardner would have to retire from the race due to nasty engine problems.
- Lap 81: Tom Pistone would never see the checkered flag due to having a worn-out engine.
- Lap 87: Buddy Baker took over the lead from David Pearson.
- Lap 88: David Pearson took over the lead from Buddy Baker.
- Finish: David Pearson was officially declared the winner of the event.

| Preceded by 1968 Dixie 250 | NASCAR Grand National Races; 1968 | Succeeded by 1968 Rebel 400 |

| Preceded by 1967 Fireball 300 | NASCAR Fireball 300 Races; 1965-1969 | Succeeded by 1969 Fireball 300 |
