= Margo Hamm =

First female NASCAR race car owner

Margo Hamm is a retired NASCAR Grand National Series race car owner who was a pioneer in NASCAR history because she was one of the first females to become a NASCAR race car owner. In later generations, DeLana Harvick and Teresa Earnhardt would join in her footsteps to own NASCAR racing vehicles along with a few other women that are involved in NASCAR day-to-day operation.

== Career ==
While Hamm only spent the 1968 NASCAR season as an official owner, she was the employer of Stan Meserve; who had one finish in the "top ten" while under her employment.

Hamm's car would go 3,769 laps - the equivalent of 2,458.5 miles (3,956.6 km). After only owning a stock car vehicle for one year, Hamm made a windfall of $7,100 while her vehicle started and finished an average of 22nd place. An appearance at the 1968 Daytona 500 (as an owner) would allow Hamm to have her employee drive at the "Great American Race." However, finishing 41st is not considered to be a memorable achievement at any Daytona 500 racing event. Hamm's best finish as a car owner would come at the 1968 Fireball 300; a race that was won by NASCAR driver David Pearson.
