= 1979 Northwestern Bank 400 =

Auto race held at North Wilkesboro Speedway in 1979

Race details
- Race 6 of 31 in the 1979 NASCAR Winston Cup Series
- North Wilkesboro Speedway
- Date: March 25, 1979
- Official name: Northwestern Bank 400
- Location: North Wilkesboro Speedway, North Wilkesboro, North Carolina
- Course: Permanent racing facility
- Course length: 1.005 km (0.625 miles)
- Distance: 400 laps, 250 mi (402 km)
- Weather: Temperatures of 61 °F (16 °C); wind speeds of 10.9 miles per hour (17.5 km/h)
- Average speed: 88.400 miles per hour (142.266 km/h)
- Attendance: 17,500

Pole position
Driver	Benny Parsons	M.C. Anderson

Most laps led
Driver	Richard Petty	Petty Enterprises
- Laps: 211

Winner
No. 11	Bobby Allison	Bud Moore Engineering

Television in the United States
- Network: untelevised
- Announcers: none

Radio in the United States
- Radio: Universal Radio Network

The 1979 Northwestern Bank 400 was a NASCAR Winston Cup Series race that took place on March 25, 1979, at North Wilkesboro Speedway in North Wilkesboro, North Carolina.

A crowd of 17,500 fans attended, approximately 44% of the track's most recent capacity (before it closed in 2011). Admission to one of the premium seats for this event costs $15 USD ($64.99 in current US dollars).

== Background ==
Three drivers entered the 1970 Wilkes 400 in a very close points race. Bobby Isaac was just ahead of James Hylton, and Bobby Allison was close behind. But Richard Petty, who was out of the points because of a shoulder injury suffered at Darlington in May, was considered the favorite to win the race. Isaac started from the pole for a record-tying fourth consecutive time, matching Fred Lorenzen and Herb Thomas with a qualifying lap time of 21.346 seconds / 105.406 mph. Fans were given quite a show as Isaac and Petty exchanged the lead 11 times throughout the race. Isaac, in the Nord Krauskopf's K&K Insurance Dodge, led 179 laps and took the win by six car lengths over Petty. Petty, who had started the race in third position led the most laps in the race with 216. Bobby Allison started fourth and finished fourth behind his brother, Donnie Allison. And Hylton finished fifth at the end of day. Isaac advanced to become the 1970 Winston Cup Champion at season's end, with Allison being the runner-up in points.

Bad weather in 1971 caused the Wilkes 400 to be postponed to November 21. Due to the Grand National Series' struggling car counts, cars from NASCAR's Grand American Series were allowed to run in this race. Charlie Glotzbach broke the track record in qualifying at 20.919 seconds / 107.558 mph. It was the first lap ever run under 21 seconds at North Wilkesboro, ending Bobby Isaac's run of five consecutive poles at the track. Tiny Lund, driving a 1970 Camaro, qualified sixth and led just seven laps on his way to the victory. Lund also won another race driving the Camaro that season at Hickory. Glotzbach finished second, six seconds behind Lund, after leading 76 laps in the race. Richard Petty started from the outside pole and led 306 laps to finish third. Dave Marcis finished fourth, two laps down, and Benny Parsons rounded out the top five. Bobby Allison was the only other driver to lead, running 11 laps out front before losing an engine before the half.

The Wilkes 400 in 1972 was one of the wildest finishes in NASCAR Cup Series history. Buddy Baker won the pole in the No. 71 K&K Insurance Dodge owned by Nord Krauskopf, but he only led the first lap of the race. Richard Petty and Bobby Allison swapped the lead for the rest of the race, beating, and banging each other for the win. At times was more of a demolition derby than a race. Both cars were destroyed by the end, with Allison's car noticeably smoking. This was the peak of the Petty-Allison rivalry. Petty was declared the winner, but in Victory Lane, a fan tried to attack him. But he was defended by his helmet-wielding brother, Maurice Petty. This was Richard Petty's last of 137 wins in a Plymouth.

In the Gwyn Staley 400 of 1973, Bobby Allison landed on the pole with a qualifying lap of 21.077 seconds / 106.750 MPH. Richard Petty qualified on the outside pole, and in dominating fashion he led 386 laps, winning by over four laps. It was Petty's tenth career win at North Wilkesboro and his 151st career NASCAR victory. Benny Parsons led six laps and finished second. Buddy Baker finished third in the No. 71 K&K Insurance Dodge owned by Nord Krauskopf. Allison lead seven laps and finished fourth in the race. Cecil Gordon rounded out the top five finishers. Yvon DuHamel, a top AMA road racer from Quebec, drove a Mercury prepared by Junie Donlavey and finished in tenth place in his only career Cup race. Twenty of the 30 cars that entered the race were running at the finish.

In the Wilkes 400 of 1973 Bobby Allison, driving for his own No. 12 Coca-Cola team, won the pole position. He and Richard Petty led most of the race, Allison with 161 and Petty with 222. As Petty led the race late, Allison pitted and got fresh tires on a late pit stop, running down Petty and passing him on the final lap. It was considered as one of the most exciting races ever at North Wilkesboro Speedway.

In 1975 the NASCAR Baby Grand Series, later known as Goody's Dash Series, ran its first race at North Wilkesboro, with a win by Dean Combs. Thirty-seven races were run at the track from 1975-1984,1986-1987, and 1995-1996. Dean Combs had the most wins at the track with 15 victories.

In the Gwyn Staley 400 of 1977, Cale Yarborough became the first driver to win a NASCAR Cup Series race on his birthday. Neil Bonnett beat Yarborough for the pole, but in the race Yarborough led 320 laps on the way to his birthday victory. Only the top three, Yarborough, Richard Petty and Benny Parsons finished on the lead lap.

In the Wilkes 400 of 1978, Darrell Waltrip won the pole in his No. 88 Gatorade DiGard team Chevrolet. Waltrip led the first 381 laps of the 400-lap race. But with 19 laps remaining, Cale Yarborough passed Waltrip and took the win. Yarborough and Waltrip were the only drivers to finish on the lead lap in the 27-car field. This ninth win of the season for Yarborough virtually locked his third straight NASCAR Cup Series championship driving for car owner Junior Johnson.

== Race report ==
Chevrolet vehicles filled up the majority of the 30-car racing grid. Parsons would earn the pole position for the race with a qualifying speed of 108.136 miles per hour or 174.028 kilometres per hour, while the winner of the race posted an average race speed of 88.400 miles per hour or 142.266 kilometres per hour. Cale Yarborough jumped to the lead at the start of the race, and led the first 64 laps. During that period, several drivers dropped out- Jimmy Means dropped out with a blown engine on lap 14, Bill Hollar had rear-end issues on lap 32, and Ronnie Thomas crashed out.

After pit stop shuffling, Richard Petty inherited the lead on lap 77, and held it through lap 231, only giving it up during a pit stop sequence. Other DNFs occurred during this period, as Earl Brooks dropped out with rear end failure, Nelson Oswald crashed out on lap 142, Buddy Arrington dropped out with rear-end issues on lap 168, and Slick Johnson crashed out on lap 211. Benny Parsons would take the lead on lap 240, but Petty grabbed it back on 272. Finally, Bobby Allison would make the winning pass on lap 354, winning the race over Petty by three and a half seconds. The suspension on Bobby Allison's #15 Ford collapsed as he crossed the finish line on the final lap of this race. The victory lap was relatively smokey as the car threw sparks but by that time he had already won and was headed to victory lane.

This is the first race for Richard Petty in the Chevrolet Caprice. The Chevrolet Caprice and the Chevrolet Impala were virtually identical except for a few cosmetic things. The 1977 and 1978 Chevrolet Impalas had the front turn signal combined with the headlamp cluster. The Caprice on the other hand had its turn signal in the front bumper.

Twenty different drivers exchanged the lead over the course of the 400-lap event, which lasted two hours and 50 minutes. Only four drivers would be on the lead lap at the end of this race: Allison, Petty, Benny Parsons, and Dale Earnhardt (matching his career-best finish of fourth, one week before notching his very first Winston Cup victory). Darrell Waltrip rounded out the top 5, while the rest of the top ten consisted of J.D. McDuffie, Richard Childress, Buddy Baker, Cale Yarborough, and Joe Millikan.

At the end of the race, Bobby Allison would be a mere nine points ahead of Darrell Waltrip in championship standings, with Cale Yarborough, Benny Parsons, and Donnie Allison making up the rest of the top five.

Earl Brooks would participate his 262nd and final NASCAR race. Along the way Earl scored three top 5s and 37 top 10s. Notable crew chiefs who actively participated in this race were Joey Arrington, Kirk Shelmerdine, Darrell Bryant, Dale Inman, Bud Moore, Tim Brewer, and Jake Elder.

The race started at 2:00 PM and would finish around 4:50 PM. Prize money for each finishing contestant varied from $13,750 for the winner ($59,571 in current US dollars) to a meager $625 for the last-place finisher ($2,708 in current US dollars).

The total prize purse for this race was $80,375 ($348,218 in current US dollars).

Petty Enterprises fielded mostly Chevrolet and Buick vehicles from 1979-1981, before switching to Pontiacs.

=== Qualifying ===
Grid	No.	Driver	Manufacturer	Owner
1	27	Benny Parsons	Chevrolet	M.C. Anderson
2	11	Cale Yarborough	Oldsmobile	Junior Johnson
3	15	Bobby Allison	Ford	Bud Moore
4	22	Darrell Waltrip	Chevrolet	DiGard Motorsports
5	2	Dale Earnhardt	Chevrolet	Rod Osterlund
6	72	Joe Millikan	Chevrolet	L.G. DeWitt
7	43	Richard Petty	Chevrolet	Petty Enterprises
8	02	Dave Marcis	Chevrolet	Dave Marcis
9	90	Ricky Rudd	Ford	Junie Donlavey
10	3	Richard Childress	Chevrolet	Richard Childress

== Finishing order ==
Section reference:

1. Bobby Allison† (No. 15)
2. Richard Petty (No. 43)
3. Benny Parsons† (No. 27)
4. Dale Earnhardt† (No. 2)
5. Darrell Waltrip (No. 88)
6. J.D. McDuffie† (No. 70)
7. Richard Childress (No. 3)
8. Buddy Baker† (No. 28)
9. Cale Yarborough† (No. 11)
10. Joe Millikan (No. 72)
11. Donnie Allison (No. 1)
12. Dave Marcis (No. 02)
13. Dick Brooks† (No. 05)
14. Ricky Rudd (No. 90)
15. Terry Labonte (No. 44)
16. James Hylton† (No. 48)
17. Frank Warren (No. 79)
18. D.K. Ulrich (No. 40)
19. Roger Hamby (No. 17)
20. Tommy Gale† (No. 64)
21. Dick May† (No. 19)
22. Cecil Gordon† (No. 24)
23. Baxter Price (No. 45)
24. Slick Johnson*† (No. 87)
25. Buddy Arrington* (No. 67)
26. Nelson Oswald* (No. 09)
27. Earl Brooks*† (No. 7)
28. Ronnie Thomas* (No. 25)
29. Bill Hollar*† (No. 99)
30. Jimmy Means* (No. 52)

† signifies that the driver is known to be deceased
* Driver failed to finish race

== Standings after the race ==
Pos	Driver	Points	Differential
1 ▲	Bobby Allison	971	0
2 ▼	Darrell Waltrip	962	-9
3	Cale Yarborough	932	-39
4 ▲	Benny Parsons	823	-148
5 ▼	Donnie Allison	817	-154
6 ▼	Joe Millikan	811	-160
7 ▲	Dale Earnhardt	790	-181
8 ▲	Richard Petty	779	-192
9 ▼	D.K. Ulrich	759	-212
10	Richard Childress	724	-247

Preceded by 1979 Atlanta 500	NASCAR Winston Cup Series Season; 1979	Succeeded by 1979 Southeastern 500
