= 1982 Busch 500 =

Auto race held at Bristol International Raceway in 1982

Coordinates: 36.516172°N 82.256945°W

Race details
- Race 21 of 30 in the 1982 NASCAR Winston Cup Series season
- Map of the Bristol Motor Speedway
- Date: August 28, 1982
- Official name: Busch 500
- Location: Bristol International Raceway, Bristol, Tennessee
- Course: Permanent racing facility
- Course length: 0.857 km (0.533 miles)
- Distance: 500 laps, 266.5 mi (428.8 km)
- Weather: Temperatures of 80.1 °F (26.7 °C); wind speeds of 8 miles per hour (13 km/h)
- Average speed: 94.318 miles per hour (151.790 km/h)
- Attendance: 30,000

Pole position
Driver	Tim Richmond	Jim Stacy Racing

Most laps led
Driver	Bobby Allison	DiGard Motorsports
- Laps: 169

Winner
No. 11	Darrell Waltrip	Junior Johnson & Associates

Television in the United States
- Network: untelevised
- Announcers: none

The 1982 Busch 500 was a NASCAR Winston Cup Series racing event that took place on August 28, 1982, at Bristol International Speedway in Bristol, Tennessee.

== Background ==
Bristol International Speedway is a NASCAR short track venue located in Bristol, Tennessee. Constructed in 1960, it held its first NASCAR race on July 30, 1961. Despite its short length, Bristol is among the most popular tracks on the NASCAR schedule because of its distinct features, which include extraordinarily steep banking, an all concrete surface, two pit roads, and stadium-like seating. It has also been named one of the loudest NASCAR tracks.

== Race report ==
It took almost two hours and fifty minutes for Darrell Waltrip to defeat Bobby Allison and 29 other American-born drivers in front of an audience of 30,000 spectators. This would make him equal to Cale Yarborough in the number of wins at Bristol Speedway up to this point. Notable crew chiefs attending this race included Larry McReynolds, Dale Inman, Kirk Shelmerdine, Jeff Hammond, Jabe Thomas, Waddell Wilson, Jake Elder and Junie Donlavey.

Kyle Petty scored a last-place finish due to an engine problem on the second lap of this 500-lap race. Tim Richmond earned the pole position with a speed of 112.507 miles per hour (181.062 km/h). Almost ¾ of a second would separate Allison from Waltrip at the finish. Three cautions occurred for 15 laps. Only seven vehicles would fail to finish the race. Other notable drivers in this race included J.D. McDuffie, Dale Earnhardt, and D.K. Ulrich.

The first pole of Tim Richmond's career would occur at this race while Al Loquasto would end his NASCAR racing career after this race. After the end of this race, Bobby Allison would take a slim lead over Terry Labonte for championship points.

=== Qualifying ===
Grid	No.	Driver	Manufacturer	Owner
1	2	Tim Richmond	Buick	Jim Stacy
2	44	Terry Labonte	Buick	Billy Hagan
3	98	Morgan Shepherd	Buick	Ron Benfield
4	75	Joe Ruttman	Buick	RahMoc Enterprises
5	28	Buddy Baker	Pontiac	Harry Ranier
6	3	Ricky Rudd	Pontiac	Richard Childress
7	33	Harry Gant	Buick	Hal Needham
8	11	Darrell Waltrip	Buick	Junior Johnson
9	88	Bobby Allison	Chevrolet	DiGard Racing
10	71	Dave Marcis	Buick	Dave Marcis
11	50	Geoffrey Bodine	Pontiac	Cliff Stewart
12	15	Dale Earnhardt	Ford	Bud Moore
13	02	Mark Martin	Pontiac	Bud Reeder
14	43	Richard Petty	Pontiac	Petty Enterprises
15	26	Brad Teague	Chevrolet	Charlie Henderson
16	40	D.K. Ulrich	Buick	D.K. Ulrich
17	17	Lake Speed	Buick	Roger Hamby
18	86	Darryl Sage	Chevrolet	Lee Sage
19	52	Jimmy Means	Chevrolet	Jimmy Means
20	4	Connie Saylor	Buick	G.C. Spencer

== Top 10 finishers ==
Pos	Grid	No.	Driver	Manufacturer	Laps	Laps led	Points	Time/Status
1	8	11	Darrell Waltrip	Buick	500	38	180	2:49:32
2	9	88	Bobby Allison	Chevrolet	500	169	180	+0.70 seconds
3	7	33	Harry Gant	Buick	500	47	170	Lead lap under green flag
4	2	44	Terry Labonte	Buick	499	4	165	+1 lap
5	3	98	Morgan Shepherd	Buick	499	85	160	+1 lap
6	12	15	Dale Earnhardt	Ford	499	74	155	+1 lap
7	6	3	Ricky Rudd	Pontiac	498	0	146	+2 laps
8	24	90	Jody Ridley	Ford	495	0	142	+5 laps
9	5	28	Buddy Baker	Pontiac	494	0	138	+6 laps
10	11	50	Geoffrey Bodine	Pontiac	494	0	134	+6 laps

== Timeline ==
Section reference:

- Start of race: Tim Richmond started out as the first-place driver, holding it for 81 laps.
- Lap 2: Kyle Petty had engine problems; making him the last-place finisher.
- Lap 28: Rick Newsom's oil pump stopped working properly.
- Lap 30: Ronnie Thomas overheated his vehicle, ending his day on the track.
- Lap 45: Al Loquasto developed major engine problems, forcing him off the track.
- Lap 50: Richard Petty's issues with his steering forced him out of the race.
- Lap 82: Morgan Shepherd took over the lead from Tim Richmond.
- Lap 83: Tim Richmond's engine acted up, bringing his race weekend to a premature end.
- Lap 166: Joe Ruttman took over the lead from Morgan Shepherd.
- Lap 168: Dale Earnhardt took over the lead from Joe Ruttman.
- Lap 169: Darrell Waltrip took over the lead from Dale Earnhardt.
- Lap 171: Terry Labonte took over the lead from Darrell Waltrip.
- Lap 173: Dale Earnhardt took over the lead from Terry Labonte, eventually losing it to Harry Gant on lap 246.
- Lap 246: Harry Gant took over the lead from Dale Earnhardt, eventually losing to Darrell Waltrip on lap 293.
- Lap 259: Joe Ruttmann had to end the day because his vehicle's rear end came off in an unsafe manner.
- Lap 293: Darrell Waltrip took over the lead from Harry Gant.
- Lap 303: Morgan Shepherd took over the lead from Darrell Waltrip.
- Lap 304: Bobby Allison took over the lead from Morgan Shepherd.
- Lap 472: Darrell Waltrip took over the lead from Bobby Allison.
- Lap 476: Terry Labonte took over the lead from Darrell Waltrip.
- Lap 478: Darrell Waltrip took over the lead from Terry Labonte.
- Lap 480: Bobby Allison took over the lead from Darrell Waltrip.
- Lap 481: Darrell Waltrip took over the lead from Bobby Allison.
- Finish: Darrell Waltrip was officially declared the winner of the event.

== Standings after the race ==
Pos	Driver	Points	Differential
1	Bobby Allison	3142	0
2	Terry Labonte	3077	-65
3	Darrell Waltrip	3022	-120
4 ▲	Buddy Arrington	2639	-503
5 ▲	Harry Gant	2630	-512
6 ▼	Richard Petty	2622	-520
7 ▼	Dave Marcis	2539	-549
8 ▲	Dale Earnhardt	2540	-602
9 ▼	Ron Bouchard	2516	-626
10	Morgan Shepherd	2472	-670

Preceded by 1982 Champion Spark Plug 400	NASCAR Winston Cup Series Season; 1982	Succeeded by 1982 Southern 500
