= 1979 Southeastern 500 =

Race details
- Race 7 of 31 in the 1979 NASCAR Winston Cup Series season
- Map of the Bristol Motor Speedway
- Date: April 1, 1979
- Official name: Southeastern 500
- Location: Bristol International Raceway, Bristol, Tennessee
- Course: Permanent racing facility
- Course length: 0.857 km (0.533 miles)
- Distance: 500 laps, 266.5 mi (428.8 km)
- Weather: Mild with temperatures reaching a maximum of 71.1 °F (21.7 °C); wind speeds approaching 7 miles per hour (11 km/h)
- Average speed: 91.033 miles per hour (146.503 km/h)
- Attendance: 26,000

Pole position
Driver	Buddy Baker	Ranier Racing

Most laps led
Driver	Dale Earnhardt	Osterlund Motorsports
- Laps: 163

Winner
No. 2	Dale Earnhardt	Osterlund Motorsports

Television in the United States
- Network: untelevised
- Announcers: none

Radio in the United States
- Radio: Motor Racing Network

The 1979 Southeastern 500 was a NASCAR Winston Cup Series racing event that took place on April 1, 1979, at Bristol Motor Speedway in the American community of Bristol, Tennessee. The race was notable as then-rookie driver Dale Earnhardt got the first win of his career, he would later go on to win 76 races and 7 championships.

This race was not televised or recorded in any format, watching it live or listening to it on local radio were the only methods of watching this race.

== Summary ==
Five hundred laps were completed on a paved oval track spanning 0.533 miles (0.858 km) in only two hours and fifty-five minutes. Six cautions slowed the race for 44 laps. Twenty-six thousand people attended this live event to see Dale Earnhardt defeat Bobby Allison by a time of three seconds. Jake Elder was Earnhardt's crew chief at that time; his nickname was "Suitcase" because he would help a NASCAR driver achieve glory and then leave him for another driver the following season. The notable speeds were: 91.033 miles per hour (146.503 km/h) for the average speed and 111.668 miles per hour (179.712 km/h) for the pole position speed achieved by Buddy Baker.

Chevrolet vehicles made up the majority of the 30-car racing grid. Millikan would catch something in his eye and would have to report to hospital; J.D. McDuffie ended up being the substitute driver for him.

The winner of the race would receive a purse of $19,800 ($85,781.84 when adjusted for inflation). Earnhardt took the lead on lap 474 from Darrell Waltrip and lead until the finish. If he wrecked Waltrip, it must not have been too bad because he still finished on the lead lap.

Ralph Jones (a driver-owner) was the last-place finisher of this race; he was forced to end his participation in the race due to brake issues on lap 31. There were three terminal crashes in the race along with three engine failures, one quitter along with a driver with a water pump issues in his vehicle and a driver with a defective rear end on his vehicle.

Mike Potter's career of sporadic starts in Cup and start-and-parks in Busch began in this race. Elmo Langley would enjoy his last real competitive race at this venue. He'd have a few start and parks after this but this was the last time he really tried to finish a race.

=== Qualifying ===
Grid	No.	Driver	Manufacturer	Owner
1	28	Buddy Baker	Chevrolet	Harry Ranier
2	88	Darrell Waltrip	Chevrolet	DiGard Motorsports
3	1	Donnie Allison	Chevrolet	Hoss Ellington
4	15	Bobby Allison	Ford	Bud Moore
5	11	Cale Yarborough	Oldsmobile	Junior Johnson
6	27	Benny Parsons	Oldsmobile	M.C. Anderson
7	70	J.D. McDuffie	Chevrolet	J.D. McDuffie
8	02	Dave Marcis	Chevrolet	Dave Marcis
9	2	Dale Earnhardt	Chevrolet	Rod Osterlund
10	44	Terry Labonte	Chevrolet	Billy Hagan
11	40	D.K. Ulrich	Chevrolet	D.K. Ulrich
12	72	Joe Millikan	Chevrolet	L.G. DeWitt
13	43	Richard Petty	Oldsmobile	Petty Enterprises
14	3	Richard Childress	Chevrolet	Richard Childress
15	90	Ricky Rudd	Ford	Junie Donlavey
16	48	James Hylton	Chevrolet	James Hylton
17	47	Harry Gant	Oldsmobile	Jack Beebe
18	25	Ronnie Thomas	Chevrolet	Don Robertson
19	79	Frank Warren	Dodge	Frank Warren
20	17	Roger Hamby	Oldsmobile	Roger Hamby

== Results ==
1. Dale Earnhardt (No. 2)
2. Bobby Allison (No. 15)
3. Darrell Waltrip (No. 88)
4. Richard Petty (No. 43), 2 laps down
5. Benny Parsons (No. 27), 3 laps down
6. Donnie Allison (No. 1), 5 laps down
7. Terry Labonte (No. 44), 10 laps down
8. Joe Millikan (No. 72), 14 laps down
9. James Hylton (No. 78), 14 laps down
10. Ricky Rudd (No. 90), 15 laps down
11. Richard Childress (No. 3), 16 laps down
12. D.K. Ulrich (No. 40), 19 laps down
13. Buddy Arrington (No. 67), 20 laps down
14. Roger Hamby (No. 17), 27 laps down
15. Cecil Gordon (No. 24), 30 laps down
16. Mike Potter (No. 76), 37 laps down
17. Dave Marcis (No. 02), 38 laps down
18. Tommy Gale (No. 64), 40 laps down
19. Baxter Price (No. 45), 44 laps down
20. Frank Warren (No. 79), 71 laps down
21. Harry Gant (No. 47), Dropped out after 385 laps with blown engine
22. Dick Brooks (No. 85), Dropped out after 366 laps due to a faulty water pump
23. Ronnie Thomas (No. 25), Crashed out after 335 laps
24. Cale Yarborough (No. 11), Crashed out after 216 laps
25. Buddy Baker (No. 28), Crashed out after 211 laps
26. J.D McDuffie (No. 70), Dropped out after 197 laps with rear end failure
27. Dick May (No. 19), Dropped out after 141 laps with blown engine
28. Jimmy Means (No. 52), Dropped out after 100 laps with blown engine
29. Bobby Wawak (No. 74) Quit after 33 laps
30. Ralph Jones (No. 98), had brake failure after 31 laps

== Timeline ==
Section reference:

- Start of race: Buddy Baker had the pole position to begin the event.
- Lap 31: Ralph Jones' brakes became problematic; forcing him out of the event.
- Lap 33: Bobby Wawak chose to quit the race.
- Lap 100: Jimmy Means fell out with engine failure.
- Lap 139: Dale Earnhardt took over the lead from Buddy Baker.
- Lap 141: Donnie Allison took over the lead from Dale Earnhardt; Dick May fell out with engine failure.
- Lap 142: Cale Yarborough took over the lead from Donnie Allison.
- Lap 143: Darrell Waltrip took over the lead from Cale Yarborough.
- Lap 197: J.D. McDuffie lost the rear end of his vehicle, forcing an early exit due to safety concerns.
- Lap 211: Buddy Baker had a terminal crash.
- Lap 213: Bobby Allison took over the lead from Darrell Waltrip.
- Lap 216: Cale Yarborough had a terminal crash.
- Lap 255: Dale Earnhardt took over the lead from Bobby Allison.
- Lap 335: Ronnie Thomas had a terminal crash.
- Lap 366: Dick Brooks had to leave the event due to his vehicle having a faulty water pump.
- Lap 385: Harry Gant fell out with engine failure.
- Lap 389: Darrell Waltrip took over the lead from Dale Earnhardt.
- Lap 474: Dale Earnhardt took over the lead from Darrell Waltrip.
- Finish: Dale Earnhardt was officially declared the winner of the event.

== Standings after the race ==
Pos	Driver	Points	Differential
1	Bobby Allison	1146	-0
2	Darrell Waltrip	1132	-14
3	Cale Yarborough	1028	-118
4	Benny Parsons	978	-168
5 ▲	Dale Earnhardt	975	-171
6 ▼	Donnie Allison	972	-174
7 ▼	Joe Millikan	953	-193
8	Richard Petty	939	-207
9	D.K. Ulrich	886	-260
10	Richard Childress	854	-292

Preceded by 1979 Northwestern Bank 400	NASCAR Winston Cup Series Season; 1979	Succeeded by 1979 CRC Chemicals Rebel 500
