= Gene Black =

American racing driver

- Born: September 23, 1943; Arden, North Carolina, U.S.
- Died: October 4, 2010 (aged 67); Fletcher, North Carolina, U.S.

NASCAR Cup Series career
- 37 races run over 3 years
- Best finish: 42nd - 1965 Grand National Season
- First race: 1965 Fireball 200 (Asheville-Weaverville Speedway)
- Last race: 1968 Northern 300 (Trenton Speedway)
Wins	Top tens	Poles
0	6	0

Gene Black (September 23, 1943 - October 4, 2010) was an American NASCAR Grand National driver who competed from 1965 to 1968.

== Summary ==
Black was born in Arden, North Carolina. He accumulated six finishes in the top ten in his career in addition to $10,650 ($98,601.67 when adjusted for inflation) in total career earnings. On average, Black began his races in 25th while ending them in 19th. Black was unable to lead a single one of his laps out of the 6,642 that he did in his career - the equivalent of 4,562.7 miles or 7,343.0 kilometres of constant highway driving. His career lasted three years. Black was a competitor at the 1968 Fireball 300 in addition to other events like the 1966 Southeastern 500, the 1968 Islip 300, and the 1968 Fireball 300.

Black's racing performance was the most powerful on dirt tracks where people expected him to finish an average of 11th place. However, Black tended to perform less proficiently on road courses; finishing a meager average of 40th place.
