= Larry Manning =

American stock car racing driver

- Born: October 4, 1942; Salisbury, North Carolina, U.S.
- Died: May 23, 2012 (aged 69); Richmond, Virginia, U.S.

NASCAR Cup Series career
- 71 races run over 8 years
- Best finish: 29th (1963)
- First race: 1963 Race No. 10 (Hillsborough)
- Last race: 1974 Delaware 500 (Dover)
Wins	Top tens	Poles
0	14	0

Larry Niles Manning Sr. (October 4, 1942 – May 23, 2012) was an American stock car racing driver. A native of Salisbury, North Carolina, he was a resident of Richmond, Virginia. Manning competed in the NASCAR Winston Cup Series between 1963 and 1974; he finished eighth in his first race in the series. Following his NASCAR career, he competed in local events at Southside Speedway and South Boston Speedway through 1982.
