= Stan Meserve =

- Born: August 23, 1941 (age 85); Winslow, Maine, U.S.

NASCAR Cup Series career
- 31 races run over 1 year
- Best finish: 26th - 1968 NASCAR Grand National Series
- First race: 1968 Daytona 500 (Daytona International Speedway)
- Last race: 1968 Peach State 200 (Gresham Motorsports Park)
Wins	Top tens	Poles
0	1	0

Stan Meserve (born August 23, 1941 in Winslow, Maine) is a retired NASCAR Grand National driver who competed in one year of NASCAR racing.

== Career ==
He earned a grand total $7,745 through his entire NASCAR racing career (which did not reach beyond 1968). Of the 31 races in which he participated in his career, Meserve had one top-ten finish in 4283 laps (2758.8 miles) of racing. He started and finished in 22nd place on average in his career and was a competitor at the 1968 Fireball 300. All of Meserve's races were done in a 1967 Dodge Charger vehicle. However, his later races for the Late Model Sportsman Series (which evolved into the Nationwide Series) and the Grand National North Series were done in a Chevrolet Chevelle vehicle and a Ford Granada vehicle. Meserve raced in the 1968 Daytona 500, dropping out after 34 laps.

After retiring from NASCAR using an underfunded 1967 Dodge Charger stock car, Meserve founded Distance Racing Products in 1983, a company that specialized in fabricating race cars and selling products to drivers throughout the Northeastern United States. He quickly retired from driving stock cars to become the technical director for the ACT Tour. He returned to driving full-time in 1998. Meserve is the only driver to win championships at Wiscasset Speedway, Oxford Plains Speedway, Speedway 95, and Unity Speedway.

As of 2007, Meserve was working at Dale Earnhardt Inc. and occasionally raced in Maine or on a short track in the Southern United States as a Pro Stock driver.
