= Bob Cooper (racing driver) =

American racecar driver (1935–1998)

- Born: November 13, 1935; Gastonia, North Carolina, U.S.
- Died: June 9, 1998 (aged 62)

NASCAR Cup Series career
- 64 races run over 8 years
- Best finish: 37th (1963)
- First race: 1962 untitled race (Asheville-Weaverville Speedway)
- Last race: 1969 National 500 (Charlotte Motor Speedway)
Wins	Top tens	Poles
0	9	0

Bobby Eugene Cooper (November 13, 1935 – June 9, 1998) was an American driver who raced in the Grand National Series from 1962 to 1969.

== Career ==
Cooper raced 64 races over the course of eight years resulting in nine finishes in the top-ten. He has also done 8,982 laps earning $17,495 in the process ($153,597.21 when considering inflation). Average finishes for Cooper's career is 21st while his average career start is in 23rd place.

Dirt track racing was Cooper's greatest strength, with his average finishes on tracks of that kind being 14th place. However, Cooper would find his weakness on tri-oval intermediate tracks with a finish of 34th place being typical.

== Death ==
Cooper died on June 9, 1998, at the age of 62.
