= Clyde Lynn =

American racing driver

- Born: March 3, 1936; Christiansburg, Virginia, U.S.
- Died: November 1, 1996 (aged 60)

NASCAR Cup Series career
- 165 races run over 8 years
- Best finish: 4th (1968)
- First race: 1965 Greenville 200 (Greenville-Pickens Speedway)
- Last race: 1976 Volunteer 400 (Bristol International Speedway)
Wins	Top tens	Poles
0	73	0

Clyde Lynn (March 3, 1936 – November 1, 1996) was a NASCAR Winston Cup driver from Christiansburg, Virginia and a runner-up for the NASCAR Rookie of the Year award in the year 1965. Lynn's career consisted of eight top-five finishes, 73 top-ten finishes, $70,866 in total career earnings, an average career start of 20th, an average career finish of 14th, and 24,285.7 miles (37,179 laps) of total racing experience. Lynn was also a participant of the 1968 Fireball 300.
