= Nord Krauskopf =

Racecar owner from Indiana

- Mr. and Mrs. Krauskopf at the K&K Insurance offices. They managed and marketed a benevolent fund for NASCAR drivers before, during, and after his ownership career.
- Born: January 26, 1922; Fort Wayne, Indiana, U.S.
- Died: August 3, 1986; Fort Wayne, Indiana, U.S.
- Occupation: NASCAR team owner/businessman
- Known for: One of the first NASCAR Cup Series owners to become a millionaire
- Spouse: Theodora

Nord Krauskopf (January 26, 1922 – August 3, 1986) was an American NASCAR Winston Cup Series race car owner whose career spanned from 1966 to 1977. He was the owner of K&K Insurance and a part of the business since its foundation in 1952. This was a position that he kept in the corporate world while having a second career in the motorsports industry as a car owner. This dual role lasted until the 1970s when he left the NASCAR circuit to focus on running his insurance company. His team would field mostly Dodge Chargers and Dodge Daytonas to the Cup Series races.

== Career ==
Krauskopf was known for employing veteran NASCAR drivers like Bobby Allison, Charlie Glotzbach, Bobby Isaac, Sam McQuagg, and Dave Marcis. Krauskopf has seen his drivers participate in 345 races with 43 victories (first victory at the 1968 Columbia 200 – last victory at the 1976 Dixie 500), 171 finishes in the "top five," and 214 finishes in the "top ten." These drivers also managed to lead 15,705 laps out of 90,001 while finishing 12th place on average. Krauskopf also become one of the first millionaires in NASCAR history by collecting a grand total of $1,225,994 in his 12-year career ($6,513,724.3 when adjusted for inflation) while his employees drove 91,890.6 miles (147,883.6 km) of racing action. He would also see his drivers go to the pole position 69 times. A major part of Krauskopf's career would be Bobby Isaac's championship victory during the 1970 NASCAR Winston Cup Season.

The constant changes of NASCAR in the 1970s would render Krauskopf's team uncompetitive, and mid-way through the 1976 race season he put his racing team and its assets (shops, cars, etc.) on the market and then sold it to coal mining magnate Jim Stacy. As a result, he would constantly be at odds with NASCAR officials.

Krauskopf retired in 1980 as chairman and owner of K&K Insurance Group. He sold his ownership share of the company in 1984. He died in 1986.
