= Roy Tyner =

American racing driver (1934–1989)

William "Roy" Tyner
- A photo of Roy Tyner in a white T-shirt posing in front of the grandstand of an American speedway.
- Born: January 3, 1934; Red Springs, North Carolina, U.S.
- Died: February 23, 1989 (aged 55); Conover, North Carolina, U.S.
- Cause of death: Homicide

NASCAR Cup Series career
- 311 races run over 13 years
- Best finish: 10th (1968)
- First race: 1957 untitled race (Coastal Speedway)
- Last race: 1970 Tidewater 300 (Langley Field Speedway)
Wins	Top tens	Poles
0	71	0

William Leroy "Roy" Tyner (January 3, 1934 – February 23, 1989) was a NASCAR Grand National driver from Red Springs, North Carolina, United States.

== NASCAR career ==
=== Driver ===
Tyner participated in the 1968 Fireball 300 in addition to the 1959 Daytona 500; his total contribution to his career statistics includes making fourteen finishes in the top five, and seventy-one finishes in the top ten. Additional statistics included a total career earnings of $83902 ($688,873.26 when adjusted for inflation), 45420 laps completed, an average start of 23rd place, an average finish of 19th place, and 30,896.6 miles (49,723.3 km) of stock car racing experience. Tyner has competed in 311 races in his thirteen-year career from the time that he was 23 years old (in the 1957 season) to the time that he was 36 years old (in the 1970 season).

Tyner's nicknames were The Flying Indian and The Wild Indian. His choice of automobiles were the Pontiac, Ford, and Dodge; with only Pontiac being a defunct brand name as of 2022. The most famous sponsor associated with him was Pepsi which he was seen drinking between races and which continued to be his beverage of choice throughout his life. For reasons unknown, Tyner chose to take a sabbatical from the 1962 NASCAR Grand National Season. Art Brady would take over for Tyner in 1962; finishing 21st at the 1962 Southern 500 along with Cale Yarborough (25th at Charlotte) and T.C. Hunt (19th at Chattanooga).

=== Owner ===
In addition to being a driver, Tyner eventually became a NASCAR owner. Tyner ran his own business doing auto body repair after his driving career ended. He also worked as a show car driver for Junior Johnson's Budweiser race team. Tyner's death was caused by a fatal gunshot to the head while he was in the show truck that was later set on fire. Local police ruled the death a suicide, but many believe foul play was involved. The case is still a mystery to this day. Tyner was married twice and fathered three children: William Leroy Jr., India Dawn, and Truett (who has a Pontiac patch from his father's racing days).

Tyner would accomplish twelve finishes in the top-five, sixty-one finished in the top-ten, 36235 laps, $234809 ($1,946,681.3 when adjusted for inflation) in total winnings, and 23869.0 miles of racing as an owner. The vehicles that Tyner would own would have an average start of 23rd and an average finish of 19th. African-American driver Wendell Scott would participate in one racing event using Roy Tyner's car in the 1968 NASCAR Grand National season. This event would be known as the 1968 Rebel 400.
