= Earl Brooks =

American racecar driver (1929–2010)

- Brooks, circa 1960s
- Born: August 11, 1929; Lynchburg, Virginia, U.S.
- Died: July 21, 2010 (aged 80)
- Awards: Lynchburg Area Sports Hall of Fame (1997)

NASCAR Cup Series career
- 262 races run over 17 years
- Best finish: 15th (1968)
- First race: 1962 untitled race (South Boston)
- Last race: 1979 Northwestern Bank 400 (North Wilkesboro)
Wins	Top tens	Poles
0	37	0

NASCAR Grand National East Series career
- 6 races run over 2 years
- Best finish: 22nd (1973)
- First race: 1972 Fun Sun 200 (Myrtle Beach)
- Last race: 1973 Buddy Shuman 100 (Hickory)
Wins	Top tens	Poles
0	2	0
- Statistics up to date as of March 15, 2014.

Earl Lee Brooks (August 11, 1929 – July 21, 2010) was an American NASCAR Winston Cup Series driver whose career spanned from 1962 to 1979.

His career came at a time when NASCAR was less organized than it is today and drivers independently owned their vehicles from the multi-car teams that emerged during the 1970s and 1980s. Brooks would befriend Wendell Scott who would become the first African-American to drive in NASCAR.

Brooks experienced "top five" finishes at the 1963 South Boston 400, the 1969 Fireball 300, and the 1971 Nashville 420. His first "top ten finish" came in 1962 race at New Asheville Speedway while his final "top ten finish" came at the 1971 Georgia 500.

== Career ==
Brooks managed to finish his career with three finishes in the "top five" 37 finishes in the "top ten," and has led 24 laps prior to retiring from NASCAR. Brooks has competed in 43,196 laps of professional stock car racing - the equivalent of driving 33,402.1 miles or 53,755.5 kilometres on the back country roads. While obtaining an average start of 23rd, he has managed to improve on these starts to finish in 20th place on average. Brooks' total career earnings while employed in the NASCAR Cup Series is $125,701 ($557,614.48 when adjusted for inflation). The most money that Brooks would make in a single year was $34,793 back in 1969 ($305,464.86 when adjusted for inflation).

The preferred ride for Brooks would in the No. 7 Dodge that was sponsored by Reid Trailer Sales and owned by Buddy Arrington. While Earl would find much of his success at Chattanooga International Raceway, where he would finish an average of eighth place over the course of his NASCAR career, his "poison" would come at Atlanta Motor Speedway where he would finish his races in 31st place on average. Brooks was considered by those who watched him to be more of a dirt racer than a driver who could perform well on paved tracks; especially on intermediate tri-ovals where his average finish was a lowly 28th place compared to the 15th place average that he had on the traditional NASCAR dirt tracks.

As one of the earliest professionals of any sport, Brooks played the game simply to feed his family and to be a breadwinner to his family. Brooks never had the money or the time attract corporate sponsors for his racing team. His "second job" was being a mechanic for a garage on Lynchburg's Mayflower Drive; where he worked from Monday to Friday to pay off any bills that NASCAR couldn't help with. In the summertime, Brooks would wear sandals while racing; something that would eventually become banned as NASCAR became more safety conscious. Like any other driver who raced during the formative years of NASCAR, Brooks was a humble man who would sometime race for meager "awards" like a block of cheese or a tin of crackers to eat for a snack after the race.

While Richard Petty and David Pearson could buy new parts for their vehicles through their corporate sponsors, Brooks had to scrounge around for vehicle components. Due to Brooks being unable to win a race in the NASCAR Cup Series, he is ineligible for the NASCAR Hall of Fame.

== Death ==
After dying, Brooks was survived by many members of his family; including several children, grandchildren, and great-grandchildren. He was enshrined in the Lynchburg Area Sports Hall of Fame prior to his death in 1997 for the hard work that he did to promote the local community in NASCAR. Brooks was a lifelong resident of Lynchburg and never left to pursue his career in a higher-profile location like Charlotte (North Carolina), or Daytona Beach (Florida). He was buried at Spring Hill Cemetery in Lynchburg.
