= Jake Elder =

NASCAR crew chief (1936-2010)

J. C. "Jake" Elder (November 22, 1936 – February 24, 2010) was a NASCAR Grand National/Winston Cup Series crew chief. He was the championship crew chief for two years and for part of a third season. Elder had these successes despite never passing through third grade.

Elder was known as "Suitcase Jake" because he could never settle down at one organization for a long period of time, hopping from one organization to the next. Elder was known for being a great chassis man and had great knowledge of car setups. When asked a question, he frequently answered "Huh?"

== Racing career ==
Elder starting working for Petty Enterprises in 1960s as a fabricator. Richard Petty said that Elder did not engineer the cars, it was all off the cuff. Petty said:

He'd put something on the car and say, ‘OK, now it's right. Here, you go drive it. And don't come back in complaining to me, because I got the car fixed. You go learn how to drive it.' Elder was certainly a leader. He might not always be right, but he was never wrong. One thing about Jake – he was always the same. When you saw him coming, you knew what you were going to get. He was good enough and forceful enough that when he said he'd fixed something, they had confidence in the car and could go out and get something done.

Elder was the crew chief on David Pearson's championship winning car for Holman Moody in 1968 and 1969. Elder worked for Darrell Waltrip when he was a young driver in the mid 1970s and he was Waltrip's crew chief for his first and last victories. Stories circulate that Elder grabbed Waltrip by his driver's suit to tell him how to race the car. Elder was hired by Rod Osterlund in 1979 to work with rookie Dale Earnhardt. Earnhardt won the rookie of the year award that season. After Earnhardt won his first race, Elder said to him "Stick with me, kid, and we’ll win diamonds as big as horse turds". Elder left the team in May 1980, which was Earnhardt's first championship season. Elder later worked for Yates Racing until he was fired in 1991 and replaced by Larry McReynolds. He served as crew chief for many additional seasons for different teams before he retired.

One day at North Wilkesboro Speedway, Elder was disappointed with his perception that other teams were illegally soaking their tires to gain additional speed. So he applied a gallon of rubber softener to his team's qualifying tires in plain view of the other teams and NASCAR officials to protest what he deemed the other teams were doing secretly. In May 2008, Rusty Wallace talked about his experiences with Elder early in his career:

Jake was old-old school. He worked for soooo many teams. But he was the guy you would call when you needed some help. If your old car wasn't running right, and you were confused, you'd want to call Jake and say, ‘Hey, can you come bail me out?' And he could help you fix it. I called him once, when my car wasn't running right, and asked, ‘Jake, can you come over and crew chief this car for me?' And he said, ‘All right, just one race.' And he came over with his tool box – which was filled with so much doggone prehistoric stuff that it was unreal. He had the string out, and the levels, and said, ‘You do this and this.…' And I took it to Charlotte and had my best run ever."

== Retirement and death ==
His wife Debbie died from cancer. Elder suffered a stroke in 2006. In early 2008 he had a bout with pneumonia. As of May 2008, he was living with his sister who was helping care for him during his recovery.

Retired NASCAR legends decided to form the "Suitcase Jake Commemorative Fund" for Elder. These retired drivers raced in an event on July 18, 2008, at Music City Motorplex to benefit Elder.

Elder died on February 24, 2010, of natural causes while at Autumn Care of Statesville, North Carolina. NASCAR released a statement "[He] was one of the first crew chiefs in NASCAR to achieve celebrity status with our fans. He was a pioneer in that regard, and his celebrity was well deserved. He was truly one of the greatest crew chiefs of all time, winning two championships with David Pearson. Our sport has lost one of its legends."
