= Bill Seifert =

American racing driver (born 1939)

- Born: William John Seifert; July 2, 1939 (age 87); Skyland, North Carolina, U.S.

NASCAR Cup Series career
- 235 races run over 9 years
- Best finish: 13th (1969, 1971)
- First race: 1966 Southeastern 500 (Bristol)
- Last race: 1979 Gabriel 400 (Michigan)
Wins	Top tens	Poles
0	49	0

NASCAR Grand National East Series career
- 1 race run over 1 year
- Best finish: N/A (1972)
- First race: 1972 Fun Sun 200 Myrtle Beach)
Wins	Top tens	Poles
0	0	0
- Statistics up to date as of May 21, 2026.

William John Seifert (born July 2, 1939) is an American former NASCAR Winston Cup Series driver who raced from 1966 to 1979.

== Career ==
Seifert raced 41,875 laps for 33,835.4 miles (54,452.8 km). His grand total for race winnings is $147,831 USD ($1,175,238.23 when adjusted for inflation). Seifert's average career start is 21st and his average career finish is 19th. He was also a NASCAR owner from 1966 to 1973, providing rides to notable drivers like Cale Yarborough, LeeRoy Yarbrough, and Cecil Gordon. The Seifert-owned vehicles managed to gain eight finishes in the top five and seventy-one finishes in the top ten. Total earnings for all the vehicles owned by Seifert were $467,360 USD ($3,389,586.21 in when adjusted for inflation) after racing 57,130.7 miles (91,942.9 km); which is the equivalent of 65,738 laps.
