= Jabe Thomas =

American racing driver (1930–2015)

Cerry Ezra "Jabe" Thomas
- Thomas showing off his #25 Plymouth Roadrunner (circa 1971)
- Born: May 12, 1930; Christiansburg, Virginia, U.S.
- Died: June 4, 2015 (aged 85)

NASCAR Cup Series career
- 322 races run over 13 years
- Best finish: 6th (1971)
- First race: 1965 Greenville 200 (Greenville-Pickens)
- Last race: 1978 Delaware 500 (Dover)
Wins	Top tens	Poles
0	77	0

Cerry Ezra "Jabe" Thomas (May 12, 1930 – June 4, 2015) was an American NASCAR Grand National/Winston Cup Series driver who competed from the mid-1960s through the late 1970s. His son Ronnie was also a NASCAR Cup Series driver; competing from 1977 to 1989 and winning NASCAR's Rookie of the Year award in 1978.

== Career ==
Thomas drove 75,243 laps of racing and earned $295,497 in total career money ($1,458,639.53 when adjusted for inflation). All of the laps that Thomas raced were the equivalent of 65,631.9 miles (105,624.3 km) or circumnavigating the world at least once. Three finishes in the top-five, 77 finishes in the top-ten, and an average finish of 18th (his average start was 22nd) in his career were a part of his total statistics in the motorsport. Thomas started his Winston Cup Career at the age of 35 and ended it when he was 48 years old. Thomas competed in a total of 322 NASCAR Winston Cup events.

Thomas was a competitor at least three major races of that era (the Fireball 300, the Tidewater 300, and the Yankee 400) along with the other important racing events of that era. Thomas is best known, however, for his performance during the 1971 and the 1974 NASCAR Cup Series seasons.
