= John Sears (racing driver) =

American racing driver (1936–1999)

"Big" John Sears
- Born: John Hamilton Sears; May 9, 1936
- Died: November 1, 1999 (aged 63)

NASCAR Cup Series career
- 318 races run over 10 years
- Best finish: 5th (1967, 1968)
- First race: 1964 Sunshine 200 (Savannah Speedway)
- Last race: 1973 American 500 (North Carolina Motor Speedway)
Wins	Top tens	Poles
0	127	2

John Hamilton "Big" Sears (May 9, 1936 – November 1, 1999) was a NASCAR Grand National and Winston Cup Series driver from Ellerbe, North Carolina, USA.

== Career ==
Sears competed in 318 Cup Series events in his career, earning forty-eight top-fives, 127 top-tens, two poles, and five top-ten point finishes. Sears was known for driving his salmon-colored No. 4 car that he personally owned. He debuted in Savannah driving John Black's No. 81 to a decent eighth-place finish. The best points finish for Sears was fifth, which he achieved back-to-back in 1967 and 1968. He retired after a dismal 1973 season in which he was plagued with engine and mechanical failures.
