= Dick May =

American racing driver (1930–2009)

- Born: Richard Shelton May; November 7, 1930 Astoria, New York, U.S.
- Died: June 9, 2009 (aged 78) Salisbury, North Carolina, U.S.
- Retired: 1986

Modified racing career
- Debut season: 1950
- Car number: B29
- Championships: 1

NASCAR Cup Series career
- 185 races run over 16 years
- Best finish: 15th (1978)
- First race: 1970 Daytona 500 Qualifier #2 (Daytona)
- Last race: 1985 Northwestern Bank 400 (North Wilkesboro)
Wins	Top tens	Poles
0	8	0

NASCAR O'Reilly Auto Parts Series career
- First race: 1967 Permatex 300 (Daytona)

Richard Shelton May (November 7, 1930 – June 9, 2009) was an American NASCAR driver who competed in 185 races in the NASCAR Grand National/Winston Cup Series between 1967 and 1985.

== Racing career ==
May began his racing career at the St. Lawrence Valley Speedway in Canton, New York. He spent much of his early career racing at the Watertown Speedway, New York, where he was 1962 Track Champion.

Known as NASCAR’s pinch hitter, May was a coveted as a relief driver and hailed for his ability to qualify cars and avoid crashing, and some estimates put his total NASCAR appearances at over 500. In the 1975 running of the Mason-Dixon 500, May drove five different cars but did not finish the race.

After retiring as a driver, May worked as a NASCAR inspector until 2003. He was inducted into the Northeast Dirt Modified Hall of Fame in 2007.

== Death ==
On June 9, 2009, May died following a long illness.

== Motorsports career results ==
=== NASCAR ===
(key) (Bold – Pole position awarded by qualifying time. Italics – Pole position earned by points standings or practice time. * – Most laps led.)

==== Grand National Series ====
NASCAR Grand National Series results
Year	Team	No.	Make	1	2	3	4	5	6	7	8	9	10	11	12	13	14	15	16	17	18	19	20	21	22	23	24	25	26	27	28	29	30	31	32	33	34	35	36	37	38	39	40	41	42	43	44	45	46	47	48	NGNC	Pts	Ref
1970	Ron Ronacher	67	Ford	RSD	DAY	DAY; 19	DAY; DNQ	RCH; 25	CAR	SVH; 17	ATL	BRI	TAL; DNQ	NWS; DNQ	CLB; 22	DAR; DNQ	BLV; 23	LGY; 15	CLT	SMR; 22	MAR; 29	MCH	RSD	HCY	KPT	GPS	DAY	AST; 20	TPN; 25	TRN; 24	BRI; DNQ	SMR	NSV; 18	ATL	CLB; 20	ONA	MCH	TAL	BGS	SBO	DAR	HCY	RCH	DOV; 32	NCF	NWS	CLT; DNQ	MAR; DNQ	MGR; 29	CAR	LGY; 30	44th	551	
1971	Ron Ronacher	67	Ford	RSD	DAY; 26	DAY	DAY; DNQ	ONT	RCH; 25	CAR; 35	HCY	BRI; 21	ATL	CLB; 18	GPS	SMR; 20	NWS	MAR	DAR	SBO; 14	TAL	ASH; 6	KPT; 14	CLT	DOV; 30	MCH; 40	RSD	HOU	GPS; 25	DAY					NSV; 29																	32nd	1090	
1971	Langley Racing	64	Ford																												BRI; 29																					32nd	1090	
1971	Langley Racing	64	Mercury																													AST; 23	ISP; 27	TRN; 34																		32nd	1090	
1971	Doc Faustina	5	Plymouth																																	ATL; 22	BGS	ONA														32nd	1090	
1971	Ralph Davis	84	Dodge																																				MCH; 32				DAR; 25	MAR	CLT							32nd	1090	
1971	Ralph Davis	84	Ford																																					TAL; 27	CLB	HCY										32nd	1090	
1971	Ulrich Racing	40	Ford																																											DOV; 19	CAR	MGR	RCH	NWS	TWS	32nd	1090	

==== Winston Cup Series ====
NASCAR Winston Cup Series results
Year	Team	No.	Make	1	2	3	4	5	6	7	8	9	10	11	12	13	14	15	16	17	18	19	20	21	22	23	24	25	26	27	28	29	30	31	NWCC	Pts	Ref
1972	Bob Davis	84	Dodge	RSD	DAY; DNQ	RCH	ONT; DNQ	CAR																	MCH; 25	NSV	DAR	RCH							44th	1195.75	
1972	J.C. Crews	53	Ford						ATL; 35	BRI	DAR	NWS	MAR	TAL	CLT	DOV; 27	MCH; 18																		44th	1195.75	
1972	Langley Racing	64	Ford															RSD; 10																	44th	1195.75	
1972	J.C. Crews	53	Plymouth																TWS; 20	DAY	BRI	TRN	ATL	TAL											44th	1195.75	
1972	Doc Faustina	5	Plymouth																										DOV; DNQ	MAR	NWS	CLT	CAR	TWS	44th	1195.75	
1973	Walter Ballard	35	Mercury	RSD	DAY	RCH	CAR	BRI	ATL	NWS	DAR	MAR	TAL; 21	NSV	CLT	DOV	TWS	RSD	MCH	DAY	BRI	ATL	TAL												71st	566.05	
1973	Earl Brooks	08	Ford																					NSV; 28					MAR; DNQ	CLT	CAR				71st	566.05	
1973	Bill Hollar	29	Mercury																						DAR; 32	RCH; 24	DOV	NWS							71st	566.05	
1974	Gray Racing	19	Mercury	RSD; 14																															77th	5.32	
1974	Travis Tiller	46	Dodge		DAY; DNQ	RCH	CAR	BRI	ATL	DAR	NWS	MAR	TAL	NSV	DOV	CLTl	RSD																		77th	5.32	
1974	Gray Racing	19	Chevy															MCH; QL^{†}	DAY	BRI	NSV	ATL	POC												77th	5.32	
1974	Langley Racing	64	Ford																					TAL; 18	MCH	DAR	RCH	DOV	NWS	MAR	CLT	CAR	ONT		77th	5.32	
1975	Frank Warren	79	Dodge	RSD	DAY; QL^{‡}																														41st	631	
1975	McDuffie Racing	70	Chevy			RCH; 20	CAR	BRI	ATL	NWS	DAR	MAR	TAL	NSV																					41st	631	
1975	Ed Negre	8	Dodge												DOV; 35	CLT	RSD	MCH																	41st	631	
1975	Gray Racing	19	Chevy																DAY; 23	NSV															41st	631	
1975	Marcis Auto Racing	2	Dodge																		POC; 17	TAL													41st	631	
1975	Hiram Handy	33	Chevy																				MCH; 19	DAR; 8						CAR; 17	BRI; 21	ATL	ONT		41st	631	
1975	Donlavey Racing	90	Ford																						DOV; 37	NWS	MAR	CLT	RCH						41st	631	
1976	Hiram Handy	33	Chevy	RSD	DAY; 38	CAR; 16	RCH	BRI	ATL	NWS	DAR; 15	MAR	TAL	NSV	DOV																				25th	1719	
1976	Don Robertson	25	Chevy													CLT; 21	RSD	MCH; 14	DAY; 27	NSV; 21	POC; 18	TAL; 19	MCH; 16	BRI; 16		RCH; 19	DOV; 17	MAR; 17	NWS; 20	CLT	CAR; 30	ATL; DNQ	ONT		25th	1719	
1976	G.C. Spencer	49	Dodge																						DAR; 28										25th	1719	
1976	Harold Miller	91	Chevy																													ATL; 32			25th	1719	
1977	Alfred McClure	57	Ford	RSD	DAY; DNQ	RCH	CAR	ATL	NWS	DAR	BRI	MAR	TAL	NSV	DOV; 16	CLT; 21	RSD	MCH	DAY	NSV	POC; 24														27th	1324	
1977	Don Robinson	25	Chevy																			TAL; 17	MCH												27th	1324	
1977	Gray Racing	19	Chevy																					BRI; 24		RCH; 19	DOV; 20	MAR; 14	NWS; 20		CAR; 14				27th	1324	
1977	Bill Champion	10	Ford																						DAR; 31										27th	1324	
1977	Alfred McClure	57	Chevy																											CLT; 13					27th	1324	
1977	Rod Osterlund	98	Chevy																													ATL; 32	ONT		27th	1324	
1978	Alfred McClure	57	Ford	RSD	DAY; 18										CLT; 13						POC; 11				DAR; 38					CLT; 8					15th	2936	
1978	Wawak Racing	74	Chevy			RCH; 29	CAR; 17	ATL																											15th	2936	
1978	Gray Racing	19	Chevy						BRI; 12	DAR; 36	NWS; 18	MAR; 28	TAL; 23	DOV; 21		NSV; 18	RSD; 21	MCH; 19	DAY; 16	NSV; 18		TAL; 16	MCH; 11	BRI; 25								ATL; 19	ONT; 31		15th	2936	
1978	Ed Negre	8	Dodge																							RCH; 15									15th	2936	
1978	Hagan Racing	92	Chevy																								DOV; 10				CAR; 11				15th	2936	
1978	Gray Racing	19	Buick																									MAR; 17	NWS; 25						15th	2936	
1979	Alfred McClure	57	Ford	RSD	DAY; DNQ																	POC; 28								CLT; 17	NWS				30th	1390	
1979	Gray Racing	19	Chevy			CAR; 20	RCH	ATL; 24	NWS; 21	BRI; 27		MAR; 30	TAL; 20	NSV											BRI; 21				MAR; 25						30th	1390	
1979	Bill Hollar	99	Chevy								DAR; 33																					CAR; 26			30th	1390	
1979	Gray Racing	19	Buick												DOV; 11	CLT																			30th	1390	
1979	Nelson Oswald	09	Olds														TWS; 30	RSD	MCH	DAY															30th	1390	
1979	Don Satterfield	58	Chevy																		NSV; 29														30th	1390	
1979	Billie Harvey	87	Olds																				TAL; 41	MCH											30th	1390	
1979	Ron Spohn	65	Ford																							DAR; 34	RCH								30th	1390	
1979	Don Satterfield	58	Olds																									DOV; 34							30th	1390	
1979	John Kennedy	0	Chevy																														ATL; 41	ONT	30th	1390	
1980	Frank Warren	79	Dodge	RSD; 32			CAR; 19	ATL																											32nd	1323	
1980	Alfred McClure	57	Ford		DAY; DNQ																														32nd	1323	
1980	Gray Racing	19	Chevy			RCH; 20																POC; 29		MCH; 19								CAR; 16	ATL	ONT	32nd	1323	
1980	Ulrich Racing	40	Chevy						BRI; 16						DOV; 7	CLT																			32nd	1323	
1980	Bill Hollar	99	Chevy							DAR; 24	NWS; 15	MAR; 20	TAL; DNQ	NSV; 17														DOV; 24	NWS; 29	MAR					32nd	1323	
1980	Brooks Honda	82	Dodge										TAL; 15																		CLT; 17				32nd	1323	
1980	Gray Racing	19	Buick														TWS; 16	RSD	MCH	DAY			TAL; 10												32nd	1323	
1980	Arrington Racing	77	Dodge																		NSV; 30														32nd	1323	
1980	Nelson Oswald	09	Buick																						BRI; 26	DAR; 26	RCH								32nd	1323	
1981	Brooks Honda	8	Dodge	RSD	DAY; DNQ	RCH	CAR																			DAR; 19	RCH								38th	754	
1981	Junior Miller	79	Olds					ATL; 24	BRI	NWS	DAR	MAR																							38th	754	
1981	Thomas Racing	25	Dodge										TAL; 9	NSV	DOV																				38th	754	
1981	Ulrich Racing	40	Buick													CLT; 25												DOV; 25	MAR	NWS	CLT	CAR	ATL; DNQ	RSD	38th	754	
1981	Rahmoc Enterprises	75	Buick														TWS; 16	RSD	MCH																38th	754	
1981	Gray Racing	19	Buick																	DAY; 31	NSV	POC	TAL; 15	MCH; 36	BRI										38th	754	
1982	Jim Stacy Racing	04	Buick	DAY; Wth	RCH																														55th	247	
1982	Ulrich Racing	40	Buick			BRI; 30	ATL; DNQ	CAR; 13	DAR; 20	NWS; DNQ	MAR	TAL	NSV	DOV	CLT	POC	RSD										DOV; 23	NWS	CLT	MAR	CAR				55th	247	
1982	Bailey Racing	36	Pontiac				ATL; 20																												55th	247	
1982	Gordon Racing	24	Buick															MCH; 19	DAY	NSV	POC	TAL	MCH	BRI											55th	247	
1982	Gray Racing	19	Buick																						DAR; 15	RCH						ATL; 37	RSD		55th	247	
1983	Reeder Racing	02	Buick	DAY	RCH	CAR	ATL	DAR; 21	NWS	MAR	TAL	NSV																							64th	191	
1983	Beahr Racing	35	Ford										DOV; 33	BRI	CLT	RSD	POC	MCH; DNQ	DAY	NSV					DAR; 23	RCH	DOV	MAR	NWS	CLT	CAR; 22	ATL	RSD		64th	191	
1983	Jeff Halverson	13	Buick																		POC; 33	TAL	MCH	BRI											64th	191	
1984	Beahr Racing	35	Ford	DAY	RCH	CAR	ATL	BRI	NWS	DAR	MAR	TAL	NSV	DOV; 28	CLT	RSD	POC	MCH	DAY	NSV	POC	TAL	MCH	BRI	DAR	RCH	DOV; 19	MAR	CLT	NWS	CAR; 16	ATL	RSD		48th	300	
1985	Beahr Racing	35	Ford	DAY	RCH	CAR	ATL	BRI	DAR; 22																										61st	185	
1985	Bahre Racing	25	Buick							NWS; 25	MAR	TAL	DOV	CLT	RSD	POC	MCH	DAY	POC	TAL	MCH	BRI	DAR	RCH	DOV	MAR	NWS	CLT	CAR	ATL	RSD				61st	185	
^{†} – Qualified for Henley Gray. · ^{‡} – Qualified but replaced by Ed Negre

===== Daytona 500 =====
Year	Team	Manufacturer	Start	Finish
1970	Ron Ronacher	Ford	DNQ	
1971	Ron Ronacher	Ford	DNQ	
1972	Bob Davis	Dodge	DNQ	
1974	Travis Tiller	Dodge	DNQ	
1975	Frank Warren	Dodge	QL^{†}	
1976	Hiram Handy	Chevrolet	38	38
1977	Alfred McClure	Ford	DNQ	
1978	Alfred McClure	Ford	25	18
1979	Alfred McClure	Ford	DNQ	
1980	Alfred McClure	Ford	DNQ	
1981	Brooks Honda	Dodge	DNQ	
1982	Jim Stacy Racing	Buick	Wth	
^{†} - Qualified but replaced by Ed Negre
