= Dave Marcis =

American racing driver (born 1941)

- Born: David Alan Marcis; March 1, 1941 (age 85); Wausau, Wisconsin, U.S.
- Achievements: Holds NASCAR record for most Daytona 500 starts (33; 32 consecutive); Holds Cup Series modern era record for most top 10s in a season without a win (24 in 1978)

NASCAR Cup Series career
- 883 races run over 35 years
- Best finish: 2nd (1975)
- First race: 1968 Daytona 500 (Daytona)
- Last race: 2002 Daytona 500 (Daytona)
- First win: 1975 Old Dominion 500 (Martinsville)
- Last win: 1982 Richmond 400 (Richmond)
Wins	Top tens	Poles
5	222	14

NASCAR O'Reilly Auto Parts Series career
- 4 races run over 3 years
- Best finish: 69th (1996)
- First race: 1985 Tri-City Pontiac 200 (Bristol)
- Last race: 1996 AC Delco 200 (Rockingham)
Wins	Top tens	Poles
0	0	0

NASCAR FedEx Freight Truck Series career
- 1 race run over 1 year
- Best finish: 71st (1995)
- First race: 1995 GM Goodwrench / Delco Battery 200 (Phoenix)
Wins	Top tens	Poles
0	1	0
- Statistics up to date as of April 15, 2013.

David Alan Marcis (born March 1, 1941) is an American former professional stock car racing driver on the NASCAR Winston Cup circuit whose career spanned five decades. Marcis won five times over this tenure, twice at Richmond, including his final win in 1982, and collected 94 top-fives and 222 top-tens. His best championship results were second in 1975, fifth in 1978, sixth in 1974, 1976 and 1982, and ninth in 1970, 1980 and 1981.

Marcis competed in the Daytona 500 every year from 1968 until 1999. The 2002 Daytona 500 was the last time Marcis raced in NASCAR.

== Career overview ==
Marcis' career is notable in the history of the NASCAR Winston Cup Series. While he is best known as the last of the non-factory supported independent owner drivers, he is also known as one of the top drivers of the 1970s. During his career, he drove for series championship car owners Nord Krauskopf and Rod Osterlund. Marcis retired in second place on the all-time starts list with 883 behind Richard Petty. Ricky Rudd and Terry Labonte have since passed him on the list. If there was ever a driver who could get the most out of his equipment on a shoestring budget, it was Marcis. Marcis often owned and drove the No. 71 car. He finished eight times in the top-ten season drivers' points.

== NASCAR Career ==
=== 1970s ===
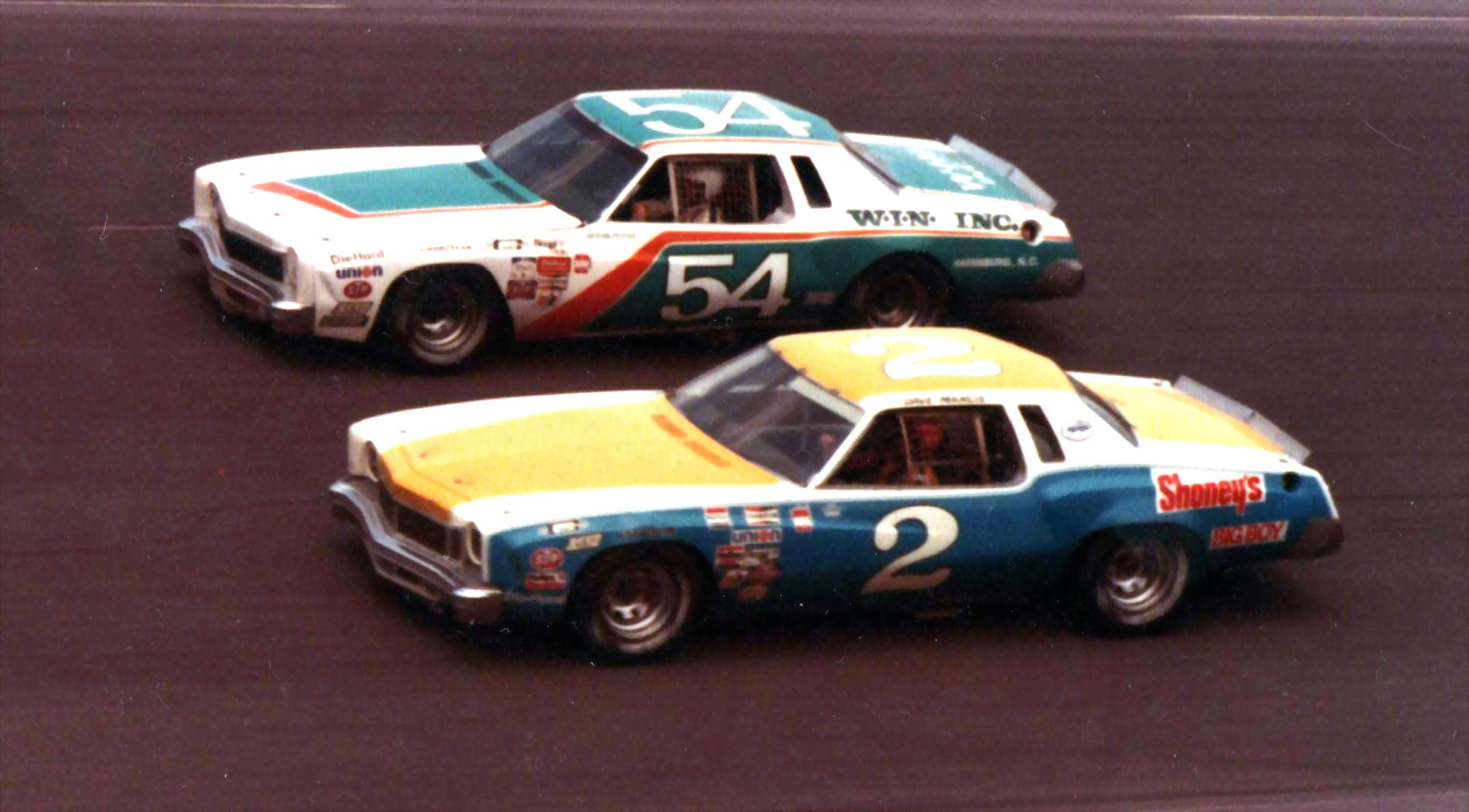
Marcis (No. 2) racing against Lennie Pond in 1978

Marcis finished second in the season standings in 1975, driving Nord Krauskopf's K & K Dodge Charger in the first year for NASCAR's modern standard of calculating points. Despite driving for some of the top teams of the day, Marcis opted to field his own teams following his sudden departure from Osterlund Racing after the 1978 season. Marcis was replaced by future seven-time champion Dale Earnhardt, who began his rookie campaign the following year. Former crew Harry Hyde once said of Marcis, "he had the talent to be a champion, if only he weren't so stubborn."

=== 1980s ===
Marcis experienced moderate success as an owner driver during the 1980s. In 1981, he went upside down during a race at Atlanta after hitting two tractor tires at the entrance of pit road while trying to avoid a spinning Tim Richmond. The highlight of Marcis' career as an owner-driver was winning at the old Richmond Fairgrounds in 1982 driving a very un-raceable looking 81 Chevy Malibu. Marcis was a lap down, but made up the lap when the race leader Joe Ruttman spun out and Marcis passed him. All three drivers that were ahead of Marcis pitted and he assumed the lead as it began to rain. The race was called complete as darkness set in, and Marcis was declared the winner. Marcis described the win, "I wasn't praying for rain, but I told the guys when I got out of the car (during the break before the race was canceled) that if the good Lord wanted to help an independent, this was his chance." "It was one of my greatest moments in racing," Marcis said. "I had even built my own engine for that race." From that point Marcis' team gradually became less competitive as more well-funded teams found their way into the series. Marcis was occasionally known to moonlight for other car owners such as Larry Hedrick (later of Hedrick Motorsports). Often Marcis would still field his own car, usually with Jim Sauter behind the wheel. Marcis competed in the in first NASCAR race held outside North America, the 1988 Goodyear NASCAR 500 at the Calder Park Thunderdome in Australia, where he finished third. He returned to the track later in the year for the NASCAR Christmas 500, where he won the pole and finished in seventh.

=== 1990s and 2000s ===
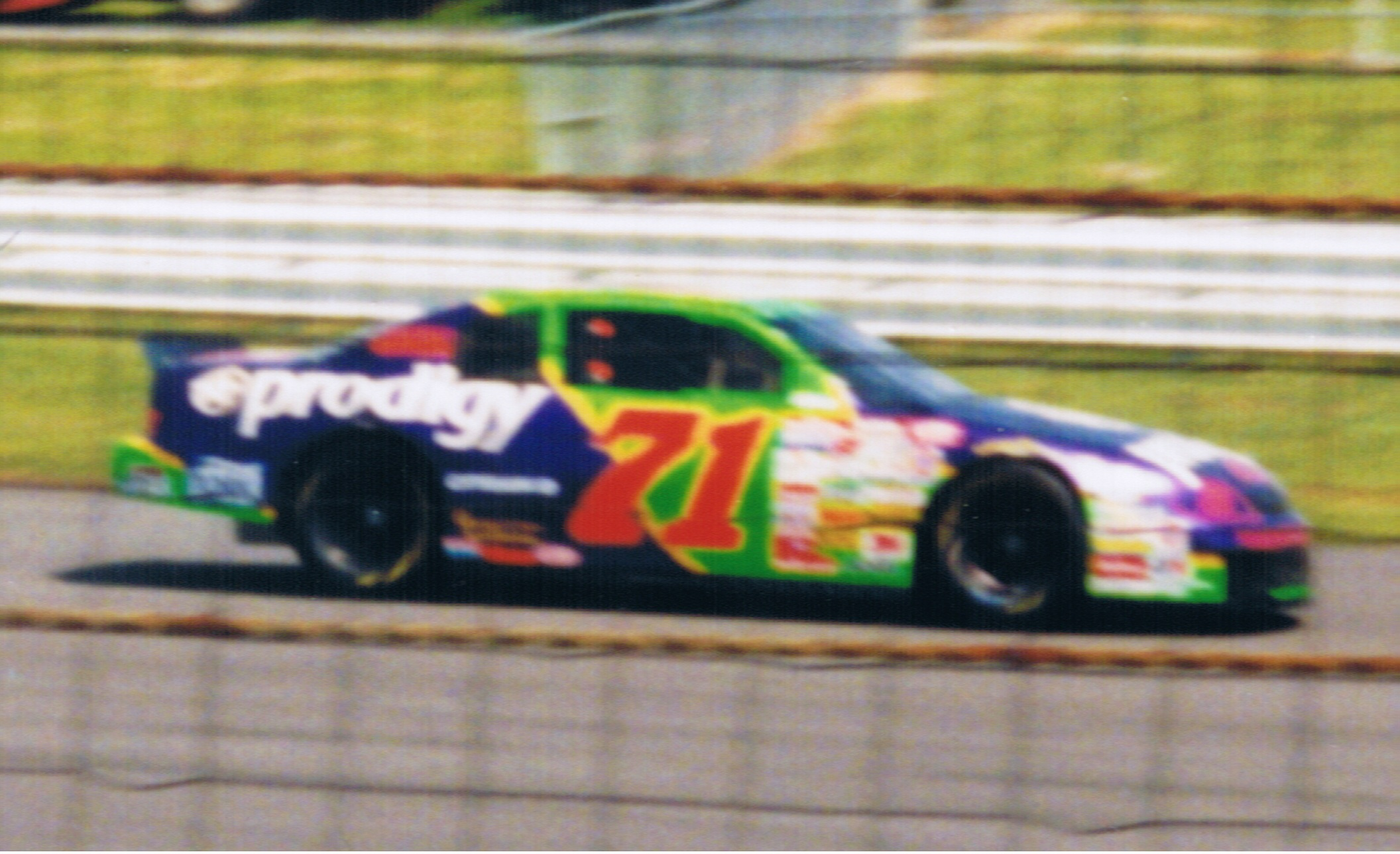
1996 Marcis in the Prodigy Internet Chevy Monte Carlo at Pocono Raceway

In the 1990 Pepsi 400 practice, Marcis crashed into Darrell Waltrip's car. Both were injured in the crash and Waltrip missed six races. Marcis' car was destroyed and they did not have a backup, so they made a partnership to run J. D. McDuffie's Pontiac when McDuffie failed to qualify. Since Marcis was injured he was replaced in the first laps of the race by McDuffie as a relief driver but since Marcis started the race he was credited with the 20th-place finish.

Late in the 1992 season, Larry Hedrick Motorsports hired Marcis to replace Greg Sacks in their No. 41 car, he ran seven races before being released. He returned to his car, who he had hired Jim Sauter to run.

Marcis started sixteenth in the 1994 Brickyard 400, but a crash during the race relegated him to a 41st place finish.

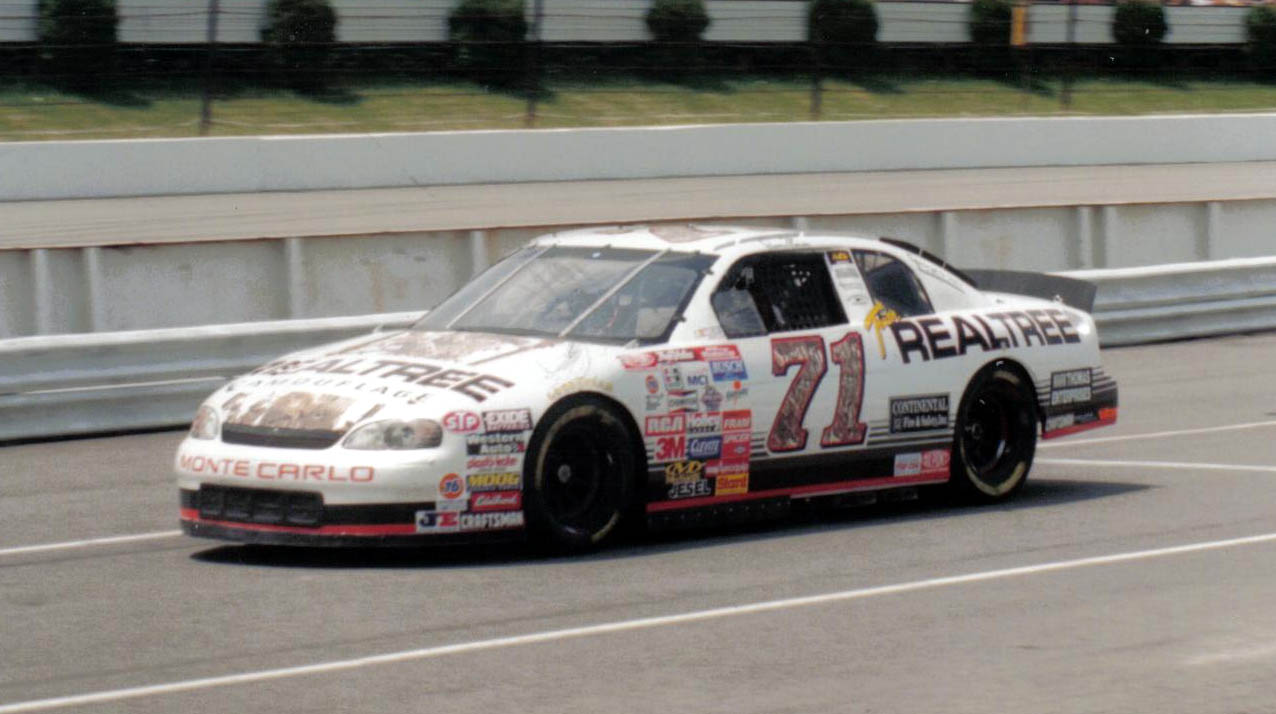
1997 Realtree car

Near the end of his career, Marcis landed the first major Internet sponsor in Winston Cup, Prodigy Internet. This company sponsored Marcis as an associate and primary sponsor between 1994 and 1996, to where at the 1996 Daytona 500 Marcis was able to display a showcar, a first for his career. Marcis had a horrific accident at Pocono in June 1999 when, after getting loose in turn two on the 91st lap, he overcorrected it to the right and slammed the wall head-on at a high speed, sending his car airborne and completely destroying it. He climbed out of the wreckage without injury. Marcis was frequently the test driver for the Richard Childress GM Goodwrench No. 3 of his friend Dale Earnhardt during the prime of his career. This agreement with Childress was made by Marcis to help fund his own race team, although he rarely had the time to test his own equipment.

Marcis finished his career at the 2002 Daytona 500, setting a record for most Daytona 500s run with 33. Goodyear awarded him with a special bronze trophy shaped like his signature wingtip shoes and Goodyear hat.

Marcis was a test driver for the IROC and the Nextel Cup series after his retirement from racing competition in early 2002.

== Personal life ==
Marcis lives with his wife in Arden, North Carolina, near Asheville. On August 28, 2026, his home was burglarized while he was out of town. Items reported stolen included firearms, jewelry, watches, and racing memorabilia, among them knives honoring past Winston Cup champions. In September 2026, the Buncombe County Sheriff's Office charged two people in connection with the burglary and said most of the stolen items had been recovered.

== Motorsports career results ==
=== NASCAR ===
(key) (Bold – Pole position awarded by qualifying time. Italics – Pole position earned by points standings or practice time. * – Most laps led.)

==== Grand National Series ====
NASCAR Grand National Series results
Year	Team	No.	Make	1	2	3	4	5	6	7	8	9	10	11	12	13	14	15	16	17	18	19	20	21	22	23	24	25	26	27	28	29	30	31	32	33	34	35	36	37	38	39	40	41	42	43	44	45	46	47	48	49	50	51	52	53	54	NGNC	Pts	Ref
1968	Larry Wehrs	30	Chevy	MGR	MGY	RSD	DAY; 20	BRI; 13	RCH	ATL; 16	HCY	GPS	CLB	NWS	MAR	AUG	AWS	DAR	BLV	LGY	CLT; 35	ASH	MGR	SMR	BIR	CAR; 10	GPS	DAY	ISP	OXF	FDA	TRN	BRI	SMR	NSV	ATL	CLB	BGS	AWS	SBO	LGY	DAR	HCY	RCH	BLV	HBO	MAR; 17	NWS; 13	AUG; 7	CLT; 23	CAR; 24	JFC						34th	851	
1969	Larry Wehrs	30	Chevy	MGR	MGY; 10	RSD																																																				19th	2348	
1969	Milt Lunda	30	Chevy				DAY; 21	DAY	DAY; 17																																																	19th	2348	
1969	Milt Lunda	30	Dodge							CAR; 37	AUG; 23	BRI; 6	ATL; 6	CLB; 21	HCY; 4	GPS	RCH		MAR; 29	AWS	DAR; 9	BLV; 14	LGY; 3	CLT; 26	MGR; 13	SMR; 19		KPT; 14	GPS	NCF	DAY; 6	DOV	TPN; 19	TRN; 6	BLV	BRI; 20	NSV; 19	SMR; 17	ATL; 31	MCH; 20	SBO	BGS	AWS; 15	DAR; 33	HCY	RCH	TAL; DNQ	CLB	MAR; 34	NWS; 6	CLT; 28	SVH; 24	AUG; 15	CAR; 4	JFC; 22	MGR	TWS; 9	19th	2348	
1969	Marcis Auto Racing	30	Dodge															NWS; 24									MCH; 19																															19th	2348	
1970	Marcis Auto Racing	30	Dodge	RSD; 14	DAY	DAY; 23	DAY; 10	RCH; 13	CAR; 6	SVH; 5	ATL; 31	BRI; 11	TAL; 17	NWS; 20	CLB; 17	DAR; 32	BLV; 5	LGY; 9	CLT; 17	SMR; 5	MAR; 33	MCH; 9	RSD; 34	HCY; 3	KPT; 3	GPS; 20	DAY; 22	AST; 3	TPN; 6		BRI; 23	SMR; 15	NSV; 10	ATL; 29			MCH; 39	TAL; 32			DAR; DNQ			DOV; 23			CLT; 36	MAR; 25		CAR; 32								9th	2820	
1970	Bobby Allison Motorsports	30	Dodge																											TRN; 6																												9th	2820	
1970	Strong Racing	51	Chevy																																CLB; 15																							9th	2820	
1970	Gordon Racing	97	Ford																																	ONA; 5			BGS; 14																			9th	2820	
1970	Wayne Smith	33	Chevy																																					SBO; 24																		9th	2820	
1970	Kaye Engineering	62	Dodge																																						DAR; 29																	9th	2820	
1970	Brooks Racing	26	Ford																																							HCY; 13	RCH; 20		NCF; 7	NWS; 13			MGR; 24		LGY; 20							9th	2820	
1971	Marcis Auto Racing	2	Dodge	RSD	DAY; 9	DAY	DAY; 25	ONT	**RCH**; 5	CAR; 34	HCY; 10	BRI; 11	ATL; 11	CLB	GPS; 4	SMR; 21	NWS	MAR; 4	DAR; 3	SBO; 27				CLT; 9	DOV	MCH; 9	RSD	HOU	GPS	DAY; 34	BRI	AST; 2	ISP	TRN; 4	NSV	ATL; 39						**HCY**; 16*		MAR; 18			CAR; 28	MGR	RCH	NWS; 4	TWS; 40							21st	2049	
1971	K&K Insurance Racing	71	Dodge																		TAL; 9	ASH	KPT																																			21st	2049	
1971	James Rupe	11	Camaro																																		BGS; 5	ONA																				21st	2049	
1971	Faustina Racing	5	Plymouth																																				MCH; 35	TAL; 34	CLB																	21st	2049	
1971	Nichels Engineering	99	Plymouth																																								DAR; 5		CLT; 32	DOV												21st	2049	

==== Winston Cup Series ====
NASCAR Winston Cup Series results
Year	Team	No.	Make	1	2	3	4	5	6	7	8	9	10	11	12	13	14	15	16	17	18	19	20	21	22	23	24	25	26	27	28	29	30	31	32	33	34	35	36	NWCC	Pts	Ref
1972	Marcis Auto Racing	2	Dodge	RSD	DAY; 27	RCH; 4	ONT	CAR; 5	ATL; 23	BRI; 26	DAR; 25	NWS; 7	MAR; 3	TAL; 11		DOV; 36			TWS; 13	DAY; 13	BRI; 3	TRN; 25	ATL; 7	TAL; 46				RCH; 5						TWS; 12						15th	5459.65	
1972	Penske Racing	16	AMC												CLT; 31												DAR; 7		DOV; 37	MAR; 29		CLT; 26	CAR; 7							15th	5459.65	
1972	Hammer Mason	87	Mercury														MCH; 30	RSD																						15th	5459.65	
1972	Penske Racing	2	AMC																						MCH; 9	NSV														15th	5459.65	
1972	Neil Castles	06	Plymouth																												NWS; 6									15th	5459.65	
1973	Marcis Auto Racing	2	Dodge	RSD; 40		RCH; 5		BRI; 4	ATL; 12	NWS; 20	DAR; 40		TAL; 17	NSV; 11					MCH; 36	DAY; 6		ATL; 32	TAL; 12	NSV	DAR	RCH	DOV	NWS; 7	MAR; 33											24th	3973.9	
1973	Penske Racing	2	AMC		DAY; 27		CAR; 37					MAR; 26			CLT; 28	DOV; 8	TWS; 33	RSD			BRI; 28										CAR; 5									24th	3973.9	
1973	Marcis Auto Racing	2	AMC																											CLT; 24										24th	3973.9	
1974	Marcis Auto Racing	2	Dodge	RSD; 28	DAY; 14	RCH; 5	CAR; 8	BRI; 22	ATL; 20		NWS; 10	MAR; 8	TAL; 6	NSV; 5	DOV; 7	CLT; 6	RSD; 27	MCH; 8	DAY; 19	BRI; 9	NSV; 21	ATL; 6	POC; 6	TAL; 11	MCH; 7	DAR; 4	RCH; 13	DOV; 5	NWS; 5	MAR; 4										6th	1378.2	
1974	Penske Racing	16	AMC							DAR; 6																														6th	1378.2	
1974	K&K Insurance Racing	71	Dodge																												CLT; 31	CAR; 29								6th	1378.2	
1974	Langley Racing	64	Ford																														ONT; 17							6th	1378.2	
1975	K&K Insurance Racing	71	Dodge	RSD; 4	DAY; 6	RCH; 16	CAR; 24	BRI; 8	ATL; 27	NWS; 4	DAR; 4	MAR; 5	TAL; 13	NSV; 4	DOV; 20	CLT; 34	RSD; 5	MCH; 3	DAY; 3	NSV; 3	POC; 25	**TAL**; 4	MCH; 5	DAR; 24	**DOV**; 30	NWS; 27	MAR; 1	CLT; 26	RCH; 23	**CAR**; 3	BRI; 4	**ATL**; 2	ONT; 3							2nd	4061	
1976	K&K Insurance Racing	71	Dodge	RSD; 8	DAY; 27	**CAR**; 26	RCH; 1*	BRI; 4	**ATL**; 32	**NWS**; 8	DAR; 5	**MAR**; 21	**TAL**; 9	NSV; 7	**DOV**; 3	CLT; 29	RSD; 10	MCH; 30	DAY; 5	NSV; 6	POC; 22	**TAL**; 1	MCH; 5	BRI; 22	DAR; 4	RCH; 7	DOV; 14	MAR; 12	NWS; 17	CLT; 29	CAR; 25	ATL; 1*	ONT; 24							6th	3875	
1977	Penske Racing	2	Chevy	RSD; 4		RCH; 4	CAR; 24	ATL; 6		DAR; 6				NSV; 4	DOV			MCH; 4	DAY	NSV	POC	TAL	MCH; 22	BRI	DAR	RCH	DOV	MAR	NWS	CLT; 23										25th	1931	
1977	Penske Racing	2	Mercury		DAY; 28								TAL; 5			CLT; 36	RSD																							25th	1931	
1977	Gray Racing	19	Chevy						NWS; 12																															25th	1931	
1977	Marcis Auto Racing	2	Chevy								BRI; 21	MAR; 20																												25th	1931	
1977	Osterlund Racing	98	Chevy																												CAR; 31									25th	1931	
1977	WAM Racing	81	Chevy																													ATL; 36								25th	1931	
1977	Osterlund Racing	2	Chevy																														ONT; 14							25th	1931	
1978	Osterlund Racing	2	Chevy	RSD; 5	DAY; 6	RCH; 7	CAR; 11	ATL; 2	BRI; 3	DAR; 4	NWS; 5	MAR; 4	TAL; 8	DOV; 15	CLT; 32	NSV; 4	RSD; 4	MCH; 4	DAY; 6	NSV; 4	POC; 4		MCH; 4	BRI; 6	DAR; 35	RCH; 9	DOV; 8	MAR; 8	NWS; 8	CLT; 3	CAR; 8	ATL; 3	ONT; 27							5th	4335	
1978	Osterlund Racing	2	Olds																			TAL; 14																		5th	4335	
1979	Marcis Auto Racing	02	Chevy	RSD; 24	DAY; 24	CAR; 16	RCH; 16	ATL; 6	NWS; 12	BRI; 17	DAR; 27	MAR; 26																												20th	2736	
1979	Marcis Auto Racing	71	Chevy										TAL; 14	NSV	DOV	CLT; 26	TWS	RSD	MCH; 26	DAY; 17	NSV	POC	TAL; 31	MCH; 30	BRI; 18	DAR; 6	RCH; 7	DOV; 7	MAR; 5	CLT; 37	NWS; 21	CAR; 9	ATL; 23	ONT; 17						20th	2736	
1980	Marcis Auto Racing	71	Chevy	RSD; 17		RCH; 4	CAR; 9		BRI; 9	DAR; 23	NWS; 21	MAR; 8		NSV; 11	DOV; 25			RSD; 6	MCH; 35		NSV; 14	POC; 8		MCH; 26	BRI; 7	DAR; 8	RCH; 7	DOV; 12	NWS; 3	MAR; 5		CAR; 6	ATL; 22	ONT; 15						9th	3745	
1980	Marcis Auto Racing	71	Olds		DAY; 22			ATL; 4					TAL; 29			CLT; 29	TWS; 7			DAY; 33			TAL; 39								CLT; 19									9th	3745	
1981	Marcis Auto Racing	71	Chevy	RSD; 28					BRI; 31	**NWS**; 4	DAR; 3	MAR; 11		NSV; 10	DOV; 31			RSD; 9									RCH; 19	DOV; 8	MAR; 14	NWS; 16		CAR; 12								9th	3507	
1981	Marcis Auto Racing	71	Olds		DAY; 15			ATL; 27																																9th	3507	
1981	Marcis Auto Racing	71	Dodge			RCH; 22	CAR; 15									CLT; 35																								9th	3507	
1981	Marcis Auto Racing	71	Buick										TAL; 14				TWS; 5		MCH; 29	DAY; 13		POC; 33	TAL; 10	MCH; 11	BRI; 9	DAR; 3					CLT; 40		ATL; 28							9th	3507	
1981	Negre Racing	71	Chrysler																		NSV; 25																			9th	3507	
1981	Marcis Auto Racing	71	Pontiac																															RSD; 25						9th	3507	
1982	Marcis Auto Racing	71	Buick	DAY; 24			ATL; 12		DAR; 27			TAL; 30			CLT; 9			MCH; 14	DAY; 10		POC; 8	TAL; 13	MCH; 8	BRI; 21					CLT; 32			ATL; 6								6th	3666	
1982	Marcis Auto Racing	71	Chevy		RCH; 1	BRI; 10		CAR; 21		NWS; 29	MAR; 6		NSV; 8	DOV; 2		POC; 10				NSV; 11					DAR; 10	RCH; 8	DOV; 6	NWS; 11		MAR; 28	CAR; 11									6th	3666	
1982	Marcis Auto Racing	71	Pontiac														RSD; 30																RSD; 29							6th	3666	
1983	Marcis Auto Racing	71	Chevy	DAY; 32	RCH; 9	CAR; 34	ATL; 13	DAR; 33	NWS; 9	MAR; 19	TAL; 9	NSV; 27	DOV; 16	BRI; 12	CLT; 10		POC; 11	MCH; 30	DAY; 13	NSV; 9	POC; 8	TAL; 32	MCH; 11	BRI; 20	DAR; 14	RCH; 18	DOV; 22	MAR; 28	NWS; 25		CAR; 7									11th	3361	
1983	Marcis Auto Racing	71	Pontiac													RSD; 12																								11th	3361	
1983	Marcis Auto Racing	71	Olds																											CLT; 17		ATL; 13	RSD; 12							11th	3361	
1984	RahMoc Enterprises	75	Pontiac	DAY; 42		CAR; 9	ATL; 18	BRI; 4	NWS; 13	DAR; 13	MAR; 19	TAL; 8	NSV; 10	DOV; 20	CLT; 36	RSD; 34	POC; 15	MCH; 21	DAY; 18	NSV; 23	POC; 26	TAL; 13	MCH; 19	BRI; 4	DAR; 21	RCH; 16	DOV; 4	MAR; 7	CLT; 24	NWS; 26	CAR; 9	ATL; 10	RSD; 20							13th	3416	
1984	RahMoc Enterprises	75	Chevy		RCH; 11																																			13th	3416	
1985	Marcis Auto Racing	71	Chevy	DAY; 24			ATL; 37					TAL; 8					MCH; 9	DAY; 23	POC; 38	TAL; 26	MCH; 12		DAR; 23	RCH; 17	DOV; 19	MAR; 23	NWS; 9	CLT; 34	CAR; 14	ATL; 28	RSD; 18									18th	2871	
1985	Marcis Auto Racing	71	Olds		RCH; 8	CAR; 26		BRI; 24	DAR; 31	NWS; 16	MAR; 26		DOV; 9	CLT; 11	RSD; 12	POC; 27						BRI; 23																		18th	2871	
1986	Marcis Auto Racing	71	Pontiac	DAY; 38			ATL; 33					TAL; 11			RSD; 38	POC; 14	MCH; 37	DAY; 20	POC; 24	TAL; 36																				17th	2912	
1986	Marcis Auto Racing	71	Chevy		RCH; 9	CAR; 27		BRI; 27	DAR; 27	NWS; 25	MAR; 16		DOV; 21								GLN; 13	MCH; 35	BRI; 15	DAR; 11	RCH; 23	DOV; 5	MAR; 9	NWS; 8	CLT; 11	CAR; 34	ATL; 33	RSD; 12								17th	2912	
1986	Marcis Auto Racing	71	Ford											CLT; 16																										17th	2912	
1987	Marcis Auto Racing	71	Chevy	DAY; 34	CAR; 35	RCH; 8	ATL; 31	DAR; 33	NWS; 26	BRI; 27	MAR; 23	TAL; 13	CLT; 14	DOV; 8	POC; 27	RSD; 16	MCH; 15	DAY; 3	POC; 9	TAL; 22	GLN; 3	MCH; 35	BRI; 18	DAR; 16	RCH; 7	DOV; 15	MAR; 27	NWS; 30	CLT; 18	CAR; 22	RSD; 9	ATL; 32								18th	3080	
1988	Marcis Auto Racing	71	Chevy	DAY; 20	RCH; 17	CAR; 23	ATL; 15	DAR; 37	BRI; 9	NWS; 25	MAR; 12	TAL; 27	CLT; 34	DOV; 32	RSD; 21	POC; 38	MCH; 18	DAY; 23	POC; 30	TAL; 18	GLN; 26	MCH; 22	BRI; 29	DAR; 22	RCH; 10	DOV; 16	MAR; 13	CLT; 26	NWS; 21	CAR; 16	PHO; 18	ATL; 19								19th	2854	
1989	Marcis Auto Racing	71	Chevy	DAY; 20	CAR; 35	ATL; 42	RCH; 20	DAR; 17	BRI; DNQ	NWS; 20	MAR; 9	TAL; 20	CLT; 16	DOV; 16	SON; 16	POC; 18	MCH; 21	DAY; 25	POC; 19	TAL; 19	GLN; 25	MCH; 24	BRI; 12	DAR; 28	RCH; 16	DOV; 22	MAR; DNQ	CLT; 19	NWS; 14	CAR; 30	PHO; 15	ATL; 33								25th	2715	
1990	Marcis Auto Racing	71	Chevy	DAY; 23	RCH; 17	CAR; 22	ATL; 22	DAR; 15	BRI; 15	NWS; 12	MAR; 14	TAL; 14	CLT; 16	DOV; 35	SON; 32	POC; 22	MCH; 19		POC; 28	TAL; 28	GLN; 31	MCH; 18	BRI; 19	DAR; 16	RCH; 15	DOV; 22	MAR; 14	NWS; 25	CLT; 13	CAR; 23	PHO; 17	ATL; 34								21st	2944	
1990	Marcis Auto Racing	71	Pontiac															DAY; 20																						21st	2944	
1991	Marcis Auto Racing	71	Chevy	DAY; 35	RCH; 33	CAR; 23	ATL; 36	DAR; 18	BRI; DNQ	NWS; 19	MAR; DNQ	TAL; 18	CLT; 32	DOV; 23	SON; 24	POC; 24	MCH; 16	DAY; 25	POC; 18	TAL; 21	GLN; 37	MCH; 20	BRI; 23	DAR; 33	RCH; 29	DOV; 10	MAR; 21	NWS; 31	CLT; 34	CAR; 26	PHO; 40	ATL; 12								29th	2374	
1992	Marcis Auto Racing	71	Chevy	DAY; 20	CAR; 39	RCH; 28	ATL; 30	DAR; 25	BRI; 31	NWS; 24	MAR; 24	TAL; 27	CLT; 15	DOV; 25	SON; 23	POC; 18	MCH; 36	DAY; 32	POC; 31	TAL; 29	GLN; 17	MCH; 32								CAR; 38	PHO; 35	ATL; 22								29th	2348	
1992	Larry Hedrick Motorsports	41	Chevy																				BRI; 32	DAR; 18	RCH; 24	DOV; 26	MAR; 25	NWS; 28	CLT; 39											29th	2348	
1993	Marcis Auto Racing	71	Chevy	DAY; 33	CAR; 21	RCH; 36	ATL; 34	DAR; 25	BRI; DNQ	NWS; DNQ	MAR; 15	TAL; DNQ	SON; 28	CLT; 39	DOV; 36	POC; 23	MCH; 24	DAY; 27	NHA; 30	POC; 22	TAL; 29	GLN; DNQ	MCH; 22	BRI; 17	DAR; 29	RCH; 23	DOV; 19	MAR; 21	NWS; DNQ	CLT; DNQ			ATL; 18							33rd	1970	
1993	Marcis Auto Racing	71	Ford																												CAR; 27	PHO								33rd	1970	
1994	Marcis Auto Racing	71	Chevy	DAY; 25	CAR; 35	RCH; DNQ	ATL; 36	DAR; 28	BRI; 10	NWS; 29	MAR; DNQ	TAL; 16	SON; 25	CLT; DNQ	DOV; 18	POC; 33	MCH; DNQ	DAY; 27	NHA; 18	POC; 26	TAL; 27	IND; 41	GLN; 21	MCH; 36	BRI; DNQ	DAR; 28	RCH; 29	DOV; 35	MAR; DNQ	NWS; 24	CLT; DNQ	CAR; 34	PHO; 19	ATL; DNQ						36th	1910	
1995	Marcis Auto Racing	71	Chevy	DAY; 36	CAR; 23	RCH; 20	ATL; 28	DAR; 24	BRI; 34	NWS; 34	MAR; 23	TAL; 34	SON; 27	CLT; 37	DOV; 36	POC; 31	MCH; 15	DAY; 25	NHA; 29	POC; 33	TAL; 19	IND; DNQ	GLN; 24	MCH; 25	BRI; 27	DAR; 37	RCH; 35	DOV; 27	MAR; DNQ	NWS; 28	CLT; 40	CAR; DNQ	PHO; 28	ATL; 37						35th	2126	
1996	Marcis Auto Racing	71	Chevy	DAY; 15	CAR; 21	RCH; 35	ATL; 29	DAR; 23	BRI; DNQ	NWS; DNQ	MAR; 35	TAL; 39	SON; 33	CLT; 40	DOV; 31	POC; DNQ	MCH; 26	DAY; 36	NHA; 39	POC; 28	TAL; 11	IND; 35	GLN; 28	MCH; 40	BRI; 27	DAR; 30	RCH; 34	DOV; 26	MAR; 29	NWS; 29	CLT; DNQ	CAR; 30	PHO; 24	ATL; 25						38th	2047	
1997	Marcis Auto Racing	71	Chevy	DAY; 17	CAR; 30	RCH; 37	ATL; DNQ	DAR; 28	TEX; 15	BRI; 30	MAR; 38	SON; 25	TAL; 30	CLT; DNQ	DOV; 25	POC; DNQ	MCH; 34	CAL; 40	DAY; 17	NHA; 35	POC; 41	IND; DNQ	GLN; DNQ	MCH; DNQ	BRI; DNQ	DAR; DNQ	RCH; DNQ	NHA; 29	DOV; 34	MAR; DNQ	CLT; DNQ	TAL; 25	CAR; DNQ	PHO; 34	ATL; DNQ					42nd	1405	
1998	Marcis Auto Racing	71	Chevy	DAY; 36	CAR; DNQ	LVS; DNQ	ATL; DNQ	DAR; DNQ	BRI; DNQ	TEX; 28	MAR; DNQ	TAL; 27	CAL; DNQ	CLT; DNQ	DOV; 30	RCH; 36	MCH; DNQ	POC; DNQ	SON; DNQ	NHA; DNQ	POC; 43	IND; 41	GLN; DNQ	MCH; DNQ	BRI; DNQ	NHA; 35	DAR; DNQ	RCH; 33	DOV; DNQ	MAR; 26	CLT; DNQ	TAL; 12	DAY; 21	PHO; DNQ	CAR; DNQ	ATL; 27				45th	949	
1999	Marcis Auto Racing	71	Chevy	DAY; 16	CAR; 34	LVS; DNQ	ATL; 34	DAR; DNQ	TEX; DNQ	BRI; 34	MAR; DNQ	TAL; 23	CAL; 33	RCH; DNQ	CLT; DNQ	DOV; 38	MCH; DNQ	POC; 41	SON	DAY; 31	NHA; DNQ	POC; 30	IND; 40	GLN; DNQ	MCH; 33	BRI; 34	DAR; 33	RCH; DNQ	NHA; 25	DOV; 39	MAR; 34	CLT; DNQ	TAL; 38	CAR; DNQ	PHO; 34	HOM; DNQ	ATL; 28			42nd	1324	
2000	Marcis Auto Racing	71	Chevy	DAY; DNQ	CAR; 41	LVS; DNQ	ATL; DNQ	DAR; 33	BRI; DNQ	TEX; DNQ	MAR; DNQ	TAL; 38	CAL; DNQ	RCH; DNQ	CLT; DNQ	DOV; 29	MCH; DNQ	POC; 29	SON	DAY; DNQ	NHA; DNQ	POC; 37	IND; DNQ	GLN	MCH	BRI; 31	DAR; 23	RCH; DNQ	NHA; DNQ	DOV; 28	MAR; DNQ	CLT; DNQ	TAL; 40	CAR; 31	PHO; DNQ	HOM; DNQ	ATL			46th	723	
2001	Marcis Auto Racing	71	Chevy	DAY; DNQ	CAR	LVS	ATL	DAR; DNQ	BRI	TEX	MAR	TAL; 38	CAL	RCH	CLT	DOV; DNQ	MCH	POC	SON	DAY; 36	CHI; DNQ	NHA	POC	IND; DNQ	GLN	MCH	BRI; DNQ	DAR; DNQ	RCH	DOV; DNQ	KAN	CLT	MAR; 32	TAL; DNQ	PHO	CAR	HOM	ATL; DNQ	NHA	53rd	171	
2002	Marcis Auto Racing	71	Chevy	DAY; 42	CAR	LVS	ATL	DAR	BRI	TEX	MAR	TAL	CAL	RCH	CLT	DOV	POC	MCH	SON	DAY	CHI	NHA	POC	IND	GLN	MCH	BRI	DAR	RCH	NHA	DOV	KAN	TAL	CLT	MAR	ATL	CAR	PHO	HOM	82nd	37	

===== Daytona 500 =====
Year	Team	Manufacturer	Start	Finish
1968	Larry Wehrs	Chevrolet	35	20
1969	Milt Lunda	Chevrolet	45	17
1970	Marcis Auto Racing	Dodge	33	10
1971	Marcis Auto Racing	Dodge	17	25
1972	Marcis Auto Racing	Dodge	12	27
1973	Penske Racing	AMC	33	27
1974	Marcis Auto Racing	Dodge	40	14
1975	K&K Insurance Racing	Dodge	8	6
1976	K&K Insurance Racing	Dodge	3	27
1977	Penske Racing	Mercury	9	28
1978	Osterlund Racing	Chevrolet	10	6
1979	Marcis Auto Racing	Chevrolet	12	24
1980	Marcis Auto Racing	Oldsmobile	13	22
1981	Marcis Auto Racing	Oldsmobile	15	15
1982	Marcis Auto Racing	Buick	11	24
1983	Marcis Auto Racing	Chevrolet	21	32
1984	RahMoc Enterprises	Pontiac	39	42
1985	Marcis Auto Racing	Chevrolet	21	24
1986	Marcis Auto Racing	Pontiac	11	38
1987	Marcis Auto Racing	Chevrolet	16	34
1988	Marcis Auto Racing	Chevrolet	29	20
1989	Marcis Auto Racing	Chevrolet	19	20
1990	Marcis Auto Racing	Chevrolet	42	23
1991	Marcis Auto Racing	Chevrolet	42	35
1992	Marcis Auto Racing	Chevrolet	23	20
1993	Marcis Auto Racing	Chevrolet	41	33
1994	Marcis Auto Racing	Chevrolet	27	25
1995	Marcis Auto Racing	Chevrolet	19	36
1996	Marcis Auto Racing	Chevrolet	23	15
1997	Marcis Auto Racing	Chevrolet	24	17
1998	Marcis Auto Racing	Chevrolet	35	36
1999	Marcis Auto Racing	Chevrolet	35	16
2000	Marcis Auto Racing	Chevrolet	DNQ	
2001	Marcis Auto Racing	Chevrolet	DNQ	
2002	Marcis Auto Racing	Chevrolet	14	42

==== Busch Series ====
NASCAR Busch Series results
Year	Team	No.	Make	1	2	3	4	5	6	7	8	9	10	11	12	13	14	15	16	17	18	19	20	21	22	23	24	25	26	27	28	29	NBGNC	Pts	Ref
1985		05	Pontiac	DAY	CAR	HCY	BRI	MAR	DAR	SBO	LGY	DOV	CLT	SBO	HCY	ROU	IRP	SBO	LGY	HCY	MLW	BRI; 19	DAR	RCH	NWS	ROU	CLT	HCY	CAR	MAR			102nd	-	
1987		05	Chevy	DAY	HCY	MAR	DAR	BRI	LGY	SBO	CLT	DOV	IRP	ROU	JFC	OXF	SBO	HCY	RAL	LGY	ROU	BRI	JFC	DAR	RCH	DOV	MAR	CLT; DNQ	CAR	MAR			NA	-	
1989	Huffman Racing	70	Buick	DAY	CAR	MAR	HCY	DAR; 19	BRI	NZH	SBO	LAN	NSV	CLT	DOV	ROU	LVL	VOL	MYB	SBO	HCY	DUB	IRP	ROU	BRI	DAR	RCH	DOV	MAR	CLT	CAR	MAR	81st	106	
1996	Ken Schrader Racing	52	Chevy	DAY	CAR	RCH	ATL	NSV	DAR	BRI	HCY	NZH	CLT	DOV	SBO	MYB	GLN	MLW	NHA	TAL	IRP	MCH	BRI	DAR	RCH	DOV	CLT; 12	CAR; 33	HOM				69th	191	

==== SuperTruck Series ====
NASCAR SuperTruck Series results
Year	Team	No.	Make	1	2	3	4	5	6	7	8	9	10	11	12	13	14	15	16	17	18	19	20	NSTSC	Pts	Ref
1995	Richard Childress Racing	31	Chevy	PHO	TUS	SGS	MMR	POR	EVG	I70	LVL	BRI	MLW	CNS	HPT	IRP	FLM	RCH	MAR	NWS	SON	MMR	PHO; 7	71st	146	

=== International Race of Champions ===
(key) (Bold – Pole position. * – Most laps led.)

International Race of Champions results
Season	Make	Q1	Q2	Q3	1	2	3	4	Pos.	Points
1979–80	Chevy	MCH; 7	MCH	RSD	RSD	ATL			NA	-
1999	Pontiac				DAY	TAL	MCH	IND; 9	NA	-
2001	Pontiac				DAY	TAL	MCH; 8	IND	NA	-
