= Coo Coo Marlin =

American racing driver (1932–2005)

- Coo Coo Marlin
- Born: Clifton Burton Marlin; January 3, 1932; Columbia, Tennessee, U.S.
- Died: August 14, 2005 (aged 73)
- Cause of death: Lung cancer

NASCAR Cup Series career
- 165 races run over 14 years
- Best finish: 20th: 1975 Winston Cup Series season
- First race: 1966 Nashville 400 (Nashville)
- Last race: 1980 Talladega 500 (Talladega)
| Wins | Top tens | Poles |
|---|---|---|
| 0 | 51 | 0 |

Clifton Burton "Coo Coo" Marlin (January 3, 1932 – August 14, 2005) was an American NASCAR Winston Cup Series driver who spent 14 years in the series.

== Local track history ==
Marlin earned a name for himself at the short tracks in Tennessee and Alabama, running against Red Farmer, Bobby Allison, and Donnie Allison. He was a four-time track champion at Nashville Speedway USA (now Music City Motorplex).

Marlin was a speedway favorite with a lot of kids during the 1960s. He drove a fire-engine red 1964 Chevrolet Impala, No. 711, and was the first real "hero" to many youngsters. During this time, he and his racing "nemesis," Charlie Binkley No. 125, continuously thrilled audiences with their often tense finishes. Marlin was always available for photos and autographs in the pits after a race. His brother, Jack Marlin, was also a crowd favorite.

== Grand National and Winston Cup career ==
Marlin advanced to part-time rides on the NASCAR Grand National circuit, starting with one race in 1966 and three in 1967. He ran more of the schedule as the series changed from Grand National to Winston Cup, but he never competed in more than 23 races in any season. He never won a race in his 165 Winston Cup starts from 1966 to 1980, but he had nine top-five and 51 top-ten finishes, with many of those starts in a car numbered 14. However, in 1973, Marlin won a non points race, with one of the Duel races at Daytona that year.

== Death ==
Marlin died in his hometown of Columbia, Tennessee, on August 14, 2005, of lung cancer at the age of 73. His son, Sterling, skipped the 2005 Sirius Satellite Radio at The Glen, which was held the day after Marlin's death, to attend his father's funeral.

== Son's use of number 14 as memorial ==
Shortly after Marlin's death, his son Sterling was in negotiations with MB2 Motorsports to drive the team's second car for 2006. The team was unable to retain the No. 10 (which was to be used by Evernham Motorsports for 2006), so MB2 was looking for a new number. A still-grieving Sterling found the No. 14 available (ppc Racing's defunct Nextel Cup team had been the last to use it) and had MB2 request the No. 14, which was granted. It was run to honor his father during his year and a half with the team until his unexpected release from Ginn Racing mid-way through the 2007 season, after the team merged with Dale Earnhardt, Inc. The No. 14 was last run by Chase Briscoe, his owner and former driver Tony Stewart who chose the number for his own race team in honor of A. J. Foyt, a childhood hero of his.

== Motorsports career results ==
=== NASCAR ===
(key) (Bold – Pole position awarded by qualifying time. Italics – Pole position earned by points standings or practice time. * – Most laps led.)

==== Grand National Series ====
NASCAR Grand National Series results
| Year | Team | No. | Make | 1 | 2 | 3 | 4 | 5 | 6 | 7 | 8 | 9 | 10 | 11 | 12 | 13 | 14 | 15 | 16 | 17 | 18 | 19 | 20 | 21 | 22 | 23 | 24 | 25 | 26 | 27 | 28 | 29 | 30 | 31 | 32 | 33 | 34 | 35 | 36 | 37 | 38 | 39 | 40 | 41 | 42 | 43 | 44 | 45 | 46 | 47 | 48 | 49 | 50 | 51 | 52 | 53 | 54 | NGNC | Pts | Ref |
|---|---|---|---|---|---|---|---|---|---|---|---|---|---|---|---|---|---|---|---|---|---|---|---|---|---|---|---|---|---|---|---|---|---|---|---|---|---|---|---|---|---|---|---|---|---|---|---|---|---|---|---|---|---|---|---|---|---|---|---|---|
| 1966 | Gray Racing | 97 | Ford | AUG | RSD | DAY | DAY | DAY | CAR | BRI | ATL | HCY | CLB | GPS | BGS | NWS | MAR | DAR | LGY | MGR | MON | RCH | CLT | DTS | ASH | PIF | SMR | AWS | BLV | GPS | DAY | ODS | BRR | OXF | FON | ISP | BRI | SMR | NSV; 8 | ATL | CLB | AWS | BLV | BGS | DAR | HCY | RCH | HBO | MAR | NWS | CLT | CAR | | | | | | 95th | 360 | |
| 1967 | Charlie Hughes | 04 | Chevy | AUG | RSD | DAY; 13 | DAY | DAY; 50 | AWS | BRI | GPS | BGS | ATL | CLB | HCY | NWS | MAR | SVH | RCH | DAR | BLV | LGY | CLT | ASH | MGR | SMR | BIR | CAR | GPS | MGY | DAY | TRN | OXF | FDA | ISP | BRI | SMR | | | | | | | | | | | | | | | | | | | | | 88th | 680 | |
| 1967 | Cunningham-Kelley Racing | 04 | Chevy | | | | | | | | | | | | | | | | | | | | | | | | | | | | | | | | | | | NSV; 17 | ATL | BGS | CLB | SVH | DAR | HCY | RCH | BLV | HBO | MAR | NWS | CLT | CAR | AWS | | | | | | 88th | 680 | |
| 1969 | Cunningham-Kelley Racing | 07 | Chevy | MGR | MGY | RSD | DAY | DAY | DAY | CAR | AUG | BRI | ATL | CLB | HCY | GPS | RCH | NWS | MAR | AWS | DAR | BLV | LGY | CLT | MGR | SMR | MCH | KPT; 22 | GPS | NCF | DAY | DOV | TPN | TRN | BLV | BRI; 30 | NSV; 7 | SMR | ATL; 13 | MCH | SBO | BGS | AWS | DAR; 31 | HCY | RCH | TAL; 10 | CLB | MAR | NWS | CLT; 39 | SVH | AUG | CAR | JFC | MGR | TWS | 52nd | 375 | |
| 1970 | Cunningham-Kelley Racing | 07 | Chevy | RSD | DAY; 24 | DAY | DAY; 18 | RCH | CAR | SVH | ATL; 9 | BRI; 9 | TAL; 10 | NWS | CLB | DAR | BLV | LGY | CLT; 30 | SMR | MAR | MCH; 31 | RSD | HCY | KPT | GPS | DAY; 34 | AST | TPN | TRN | BRI | SMR | NSV; 6 | ATL; 15 | CLB | ONA | MCH; 17 | TAL; 14 | BGS | SBO | DAR | HCY | RCH | DOV | NCF | NWS | CLT; 34 | MAR | MGR | CAR | LGY | | | | | | | 38th | 876 | |
| 1971 | Cunningham-Kelley Racing | 07 | Chevy | RSD | DAY | DAY; 13 | DAY; 20 | ONT | RCH | CAR | HCY | BRI | ATL; 15 | CLB | GPS | SMR | NWS | MAR | DAR | SBO | TAL; 39 | ASH | KPT | CLT | DOV | MCH; 27 | RSD | HOU | GPS | DAY; 31 | BRI; 14 | AST | ISP | TRN | NSV; 25 | ATL; 34 | BGS | ONA | MCH; 33 | TAL; 42 | CLB | HCY | DAR | MAR | CLT | DOV | CAR; 38 | MGR | RCH | NWS | TWS | | | | | | | 49th | 527 | |

==== Winston Cup Series ====
NASCAR Winston Cup Series results
| Year | Team | No. | Make | 1 | 2 | 3 | 4 | 5 | 6 | 7 | 8 | 9 | 10 | 11 | 12 | 13 | 14 | 15 | 16 | 17 | 18 | 19 | 20 | 21 | 22 | 23 | 24 | 25 | 26 | 27 | 28 | 29 | 30 | 31 | NWCC | Pts | Ref |
|---|---|---|---|---|---|---|---|---|---|---|---|---|---|---|---|---|---|---|---|---|---|---|---|---|---|---|---|---|---|---|---|---|---|---|---|---|---|
| 1972 | Cunningham-Kelley Racing | 14 | Chevy | RSD | DAY; 25 | RCH | ONT | CAR | ATL; 12 | BRI; 6 | DAR | NWS | MAR | TAL; 35 | CLT; 28 | DOV; 24 | MCH | RSD | TWS; 3 | DAY; 4 | BRI; 22 | TRN | ATL; 29 | TAL; 16 | MCH; 34 | NSV; 26 | DAR; 10 | RCH | DOV; 36 | MAR; 11 | NWS; 30 | CLT; 34 | CAR; 27 | TWS; 7 | 25th | 3852.9 | |
| 1973 | Cunningham-Kelley Racing | 14 | Chevy | RSD | DAY; 29 | RCH | CAR; 14 | BRI; 7 | ATL; 6 | NWS | DAR | MAR | TAL; 6 | NSV; 6 | CLT; 33 | DOV; 35 | TWS; 28 | RSD | MCH; 11 | DAY; 38 | BRI; 27 | ATL; 30 | TAL; 40 | NSV; 3 | DAR; 7 | RCH | DOV; 6 | NWS; 11 | MAR; 23 | CLT; 19 | CAR; 10 | | | | 22nd | 4233.89 | |
| 1974 | Cunningham-Kelley Racing | 14 | Chevy | RSD | DAY; 4 | RCH | CAR; 24 | BRI; 10 | ATL; 28 | DAR; 19 | NWS | MAR; 12 | TAL; 7 | NSV; 9 | DOV | CLT; 38 | RSD | MCH; 13 | DAY; 18 | BRI; 12 | NSV; 28 | ATL; 9 | POC | TAL; 35 | MCH; 11 | DAR; 29 | RCH; 18 | DOV; 25 | NWS; 11 | MAR; 22 | CLT; 22 | CAR; 12 | ONT | | 22nd | 581.66 | |
| 1975 | Cunningham-Kelley Racing | 14 | Chevy | RSD | DAY; 17 | RCH | CAR; 26 | BRI | ATL; 7 | NWS | DAR; 5 | MAR | TAL; 5 | NSV; 3 | DOV; 6 | CLT; 40 | RSD | MCH; 12 | DAY; 34 | NSV; 26 | POC; 7 | TAL; 5 | MCH; 35 | DAR; 39 | DOV; 31 | NWS; 12 | MAR; 29 | CLT; 42 | RCH; 9 | CAR; 10 | BRI; 7 | ATL; 8 | ONT | | 20th | 2584 | |
| 1976 | Cunningham-Kelley Racing | 14 | Chevy | RSD | DAY; 21 | CAR; 8 | RCH | BRI | ATL; 6 | NWS | DAR | MAR | TAL | NSV | DOV | CLT | RSD | MCH; 13 | DAY; 6 | NSV; 8 | POC | TAL; 34 | MCH; 12 | BRI | DAR; 8 | RCH | DOV | MAR | NWS | CLT; 32 | CAR; 10 | ATL; 30 | ONT; DNQ | | 28th | 1412 | |
| 1977 | Cunningham-Kelley Racing | 14 | Chevy | RSD | DAY; 4 | RCH | CAR | ATL; 8 | NWS | DAR | BRI | MAR | TAL; 8 | NSV; 8 | DOV | CLT; 12 | RSD | MCH | DAY; 13 | NSV; 11 | POC | TAL; 40 | MCH | BRI | DAR; 26 | RCH | DOV | MAR | NWS | CLT; 12 | CAR | ATL; 10 | ONT | | 34th | 1004 | |
| 1978 | Cunningham-Kelley Racing | 14 | Chevy | RSD | DAY; 26 | RCH | CAR | ATL; 39 | BRI | DAR | NWS | MAR | TAL; 41 | DOV | CLT | NSV; 22 | RSD | MCH | DAY; 38 | NSV | POC | TAL; 26 | MCH | BRI | DAR; 30 | RCH | DOV | MAR | NWS | CLT; 7 | CAR | ATL; 10 | ONT | | 36th | 765 | |
| 1979 | Cunningham-Kelley Racing | 14 | Chevy | RSD | DAY; 9 | CAR | RCH | ATL; 38 | NWS | BRI | DAR | MAR | TAL; 10 | NSV | DOV | CLT; 30 | TWS | RSD | MCH | DAY; 25 | NSV | POC | TAL; 29 | MCH | BRI | DAR; 36 | RCH | DOV | MAR | CLT | NWS | CAR | ATL | ONT | 33rd | 613 | |
| 1980 | Cunningham-Kelley Racing | 14 | Chevy | RSD | DAY; QL^{†} | RCH | CAR | ATL | BRI | DAR | NWS | MAR | TAL; 11 | NSV | DOV | CLT | TWS | RSD | MCH | DAY; 14 | NSV | POC | TAL; 37 | MCH | BRI | DAR | RCH | DOV | NWS | MAR | CLT | CAR | ATL | ONT | 54th | 303 | |
^{†} - Qualified but replaced by Sterling Marlin

===== Daytona 500 =====
| Year | Team | Manufacturer | Start | Finish |
|---|---|---|---|---|
| 1967 | Charlie Hughes | Chevrolet | 27 | 50 |
| 1970 | Cunningham-Kelley Racing | Chevrolet | 40 | 18 |
| 1971 | Cunningham-Kelley Racing | Chevrolet | 26 | 20 |
| 1972 | Cunningham-Kelley Racing | Chevrolet | 3 | 25 |
| 1973 | Cunningham-Kelley Racing | Chevrolet | 4 | 29 |
| 1974 | Cunningham-Kelley Racing | Chevrolet | 31 | 4 |
| 1975 | Cunningham-Kelley Racing | Chevrolet | 35 | 17 |
| 1976 | Cunningham-Kelley Racing | Chevrolet | 10 | 21 |
| 1977 | Cunningham-Kelley Racing | Chevrolet | 13 | 4 |
| 1978 | Cunningham-Kelley Racing | Chevrolet | 16 | 26 |
| 1979 | Cunningham-Kelley Racing | Chevrolet | 37 | 9 |
| 1980 | Cunningham-Kelley Racing | Chevrolet | QL^{†} | |
^{†} - Qualified but replaced by Sterling Marlin
