= 1973 Daytona 500 =

15th Running of the Daytona 500, held in Daytona, Florida, United States

Race details
- Race 2 of 28 in the 1973 NASCAR Winston Cup Series
- 1973 Daytona 500 program cover
- Date: February 18, 1973
- Location: Daytona International Speedway; Daytona Beach, Florida, U.S.
- Course: Permanent racing facility 2.5 mi (4.023 km)
- Distance: 200 laps, 500 mi (804.672 km)
- Weather: Cold with temperatures of 54.9 °F (12.7 °C); wind speeds of 12 miles per hour (19 km/h)
- Average speed: 157.205 miles per hour (252.997 km/h)
- Attendance: 103,000

Pole position
Driver	Buddy Baker	K&K Insurance Racing

Qualifying race winners
Duel 1 Winner	Buddy Baker	Nord Krauskopf
Duel 2 Winner	Coo Coo Marlin	H.B. Cunningham

Most laps led
Driver	Buddy Baker	K&K Insurance Racing
- Laps: 156

Winner
No. 43	Richard Petty	Petty Enterprises

Television in the United States
- Network: ABC's Wide World of Sports
- Announcers: Jim McKay; Jackie Stewart; Chris Economaki

The 1973 Daytona 500, the 15th running of the event, was won by Richard Petty on February 18, 1973, at Daytona International Raceway in Daytona Beach, Florida.

Four cautions slowed the race for 28 laps. A crowd of over one hundred thousand came to see a field of 38 American and two Canadians (Earl Ross and Vic Parsons). The average speed for the race was 157.205 miles per hour (252.997 km/h) while Buddy Baker achieved the pole position with a speed of 185.662 miles per hour (298.794 km/h). Bobby Isaac would finish second to Richard Petty by more than two laps.

Both Hollar and Jett participated in qualifying and were supposed to start in the 125s (Hollar was supposed to start 38th in race 1 and Jett was supposed to start 26th in race 2), but for whatever reason neither driver ended up participating.

== Background ==
Daytona International Speedway, the track where the race will be held.

Daytona International Speedway is a race track in Daytona Beach, Florida, that is one of six superspeedways to hold NASCAR races, the others being Michigan International Speedway, Auto Club Speedway, Indianapolis Motor Speedway, Pocono Raceway and Talladega Superspeedway. The standard track at Daytona is a four-turn superspeedway that is 2.5 miles (4.0 km) long. The track also features two other layouts that utilize portions of the primary high speed tri-oval, such as a 3.56-mile (5.73 km) sports car course and a 2.95-mile (4.75 km) motorcycle course. The track's 180-acre (73 ha) infield includes the 29-acre (12 ha) Lake Lloyd, which has hosted powerboat racing. The speedway is owned and operated by International Speedway Corporation.

The track was built by NASCAR founder Bill France Sr. to host racing that was being held at the former Daytona Beach Road Course and opened with the first Daytona 500 in 1959. The speedway has been renovated three times, with the infield renovated in 2004, and the track repaved in 1978 and 2010.

The Daytona 500 is regarded as the most important and prestigious race on the NASCAR calendar. It is also the series' first race of the year; this phenomenon is virtually unique in sports, which tend to have championships or other major events at the end of the season rather than the start. Since 1995, U.S. television ratings for the Daytona 500 have been the highest for any auto race of the year, surpassing the traditional leader, the Indianapolis 500 which in turn greatly surpasses the Daytona 500 in in-track attendance and international viewing. The 2006 Daytona 500 attracted the sixth largest average live global TV audience of any sporting event that year with 20 million viewers.

== Race results ==
Pos	Grid	No.	Driver	Entrant	Manufacturer	Laps	Winnings	Laps led	Time/Status
1	7	43	Richard Petty	Petty Enterprises	1973 Dodge	200	$36,100	17	3:10:50
2	10	15	Bobby Isaac	Bud Moore Engineering	1973 Ford	198	$17,300	1	+2 Laps
3	9	6	Dick Brooks	Cotton Owens	1973 Dodge	197	$9,800	0	+3 Laps
4	8	50	A. J. Foyt	A. J. Foyt Enterprises	1973 Chevrolet	196	$7,020	0	+4 Laps
5	6	04	Hershel McGriff	Beryl Jackson	1972 Plymouth	195	$6,025	0	+5 Laps
6	1	71	Buddy Baker	Nord Krauskopf	1972 Dodge	194	$14,725	156	Engine
7	12	48	James Hylton	James Hylton	1971 Mercury	194	$4,525	0	+6 Laps
8	16	90	Ramo Stott	Donlavey Racing	1971 Mercury	193	$4,095	0	+7 Laps
9	36	67	Buddy Arrington	Buddy Arrington	1972 Dodge	192	$2,900	0	+8 Laps
10	27	45	Vic Parsons	Bill Seifert	1971 Mercury	190	$2,945	0	+10 Laps
11	24	05	David Sisco	Charlie McGee	1972 Chevrolet	190	$2,750	0	+10 Laps
12	11	95	Darrell Waltrip	Darrell Waltrip	1971 Mercury	188	$2,625	0	+12 Laps
13	14	18	Joe Frasson	Joe Frasson	1973 Dodge	188	$2,275	0	+12 Laps
14	17	92	Larry Smith	Harley Smith	1971 Mercury	187	$2,200	0	+13 Laps
15	32	25	Jabe Thomas	Don Robertson	1973 Dodge	187	$2,470	0	+13 Laps
16	34	79	Frank Warren	Frank Warren	1973 Dodge	182	$2,435	0	+18 Laps
17	28	8	Ed Negre	Ed Negre	1971 Mercury	182	$2,445	0	+18 Laps
18	15	96	Ray Elder	Fred Elder	1972 Dodge	180	$1,985	0	Engine
19	26	30	Walter Ballard	Vic Ballard	1972 Chevrolet	174	$2,415	0	Clutch
20	39	88	Ron Keselowski	Roger Lubinski	1972 Dodge	168	$1,500	0	+32 Laps
21	31	24	Cecil Gordon	Cecil Gordon	1972 Chevrolet	155	$2,175	0	+45 Laps
22	3	11	Cale Yarborough	Richard Howard	1973 Chevrolet	154	$4,250	25	Engine
23	21	60	Maynard Troyer	Joe Nagle	1973 Ford	150	$1,825	0	Engine
24	25	49	John Utsman	G. C. Spencer	1972 Dodge	145	$1,780	0	Engine
25	29	12	Bobby Allison	Bobby Allison Motorsports	1973 Chevrolet	141	$3,735	0	Engine
26	22	70	J. D. McDuffie	McDuffie Racing	1971 Chevrolet	129	$2,260	0	Engine
27	33	2	Dave Marcis	Penske Racing	1973 Matador	125	$1,325	0	Rear end
28	18	31	Jim Vandiver	O. L. Nixon	1972 Dodge	123	$1,300	0	Overheating
29	4	14	Coo Coo Marlin	H. B. Cunningham	1972 Chevrolet	118	$2,775	0	Engine
30	13	72	Benny Parsons	L. G. DeWitt	1972 Chevrolet	101	$2,195	0	Engine
31	40	4	John Sears	J. Marvin Mills	1973 Dodge	65	$2,060	0	Steering
32	23	97	Red Farmer	Willie Humphries	1972 Ford	65	$1,665	0	Transmission
33	20	21	David Pearson	Wood Brothers Racing	1971 Mercury	63	$2,200	1	Engine
34	37	42	Marty Robbins	Marty Robbins	1972 Dodge	63	$1,515	0	Crash
35	35	17	Bill Dennis	H. J. Brooking	1972 Chevrolet	62	$1,225	0	Engine
36	19	55	Tiny Lund	Carl Price	1972 Chevrolet	54	$1,510	0	Rear end
37	38	06	Neil Castles	Neil Castles	1972 Dodge	38	$1,430	0	Engine
38	5	28	Gordon Johncock	Hoss Ellington	1972 Chevrolet	35	$1,800	0	Oil leak
39	30	52	Earl Ross	Allan Brooke	1973 Chevrolet	34	$1,385	0	Engine
40	2	9	Pete Hamilton	Jack Housby	1972 Plymouth	33	$2,000	0	Engine

Preceded by 1972 Daytona 500	Daytona 500 races 1959-present	Succeeded by 1974 Daytona 500
