= 1968 Tidewater 250 =

Auto race run in Virginia in 1968

Race details
- Race 17 of 49 in the 1968 NASCAR Grand National Series season
- Date: May 18, 1968; 56 years ago
- Official name: Tidewater 250
- Location: Langley Field Speedway, Hampton, Virginia
- Course: Permanent racing facility
- Course length: 0.836 km (0.395 miles)
- Distance: 250 laps, 118.5 mi (190.3 km)
- Weather: Mild with temperatures approaching 77.9 °F (25.5 °C); wind speeds up to 18.1 miles per hour (29.1 km/h)
- Average speed: 71.457 miles per hour (114.999 km/h)

Pole position
Driver	Richard Petty	Petty Enterprises

Most laps led
Driver	David Pearson	Holman-Moody
- Laps: 125

Winner
No. 17	David Pearson	Holman-Moody

Television in the United States
- Network: untelevised
- Announcers: none

The 1968 Tidewater 250 was a NASCAR Grand National Series event that was held on May 18, 1968, at Langley Field Speedway in Hampton, Virginia.

The transition to purpose-built racecars began in the early 1960s and occurred gradually over that decade. Changes made to the sport by the late 1960s brought an end to the "strictly stock" vehicles of the 1950s.

== Background ==
Langley Speedway is a paved short track measuring 0.395 miles in length, it is one of the flattest tracks in the region with only six degrees of banking in the corners and four degrees on the straights.

== Summary ==
Two hundred and fifty laps were raced on a paved oval track spanning 0.400 miles (0.644 km) for a grand total of 100.0 miles (160.9 km). The race took one hour, twenty five minutes, and fifty-eight seconds to reach its conclusion. David Pearson was the winner of the race in front of ten thousand live audience members. Notable speeds were: 71.547 miles per hour (115.144 km/h) as the average speed and 80.801 miles per hour (130.037 km/h) as the pole position speed. Canadian driver Frog Fagan participated here; he started in 14th place and ended in 13th place. Fagan managed to run 212 out of 250 laps before the race ending with him still in the running.

This would be Tim Pistone's final career start and Pete Hamilton's first finish in the top five. Total winnings for this race were $4,740 ($42,859.58 when adjusted for inflation) with the winner receiving $1,000 ($9,042.11 when adjusted for inflation). Twelve drivers used a Ford vehicle to participate in the race in; making up the majority of the grid. Three drivers would use a Dodge while only one driver would use a Chevrolet.

Both Ed Negre and Paul Dean Holt would quit the race after driving for 76 and 73 laps apiece; no valid reason was ever given to NASCAR officials for their sudden absence from the race. Nevertheless, they were granted a $100 paycheck just for attempting to race ($904.21 when adjusted for inflation).

=== Qualifying ===
Grid	No.	Driver	Manufacturer
1	43	Richard Petty	'68 Plymouth
2	17	David Pearson	'68 Ford
3	71	Bobby Isaac	'67 Dodge
4	3	Buddy Baker	'67 Dodge
5	55	Tom Pistone	'66 Ford
6	4	John Sears	'67 Ford
7	5	Pete Hamilton	'68 Ford
8	48	James Hylton	'67 Dodge
9	20	Clyde Lynn	'67 Mercury
10	10	Elmo Langley	'66 Ford
11	8	Ed Negre	'67 Ford
12	01	Paul Dean Holt	'67 Ford
13	19	Henley Gray	'66 Ford
14	95	Frog Fagan	'66 Ford
15	06	Neil Castles	'67 Plymouth

== Finishers ==
1. David Pearson (No. 17)
2. Bobby Isaac† (No. 71)
3. Buddy Baker† (No. 3)
4. James Hylton (No. 48)
5. Pete Hamilton (No. 5)
6. Richard Petty* (No. 43)
7. Tom Pistone (No. 55)
8. Elmo Langley† (No. 10)
9. Clyde Lynn† (No. 20)
10. Neil Castles (No. 06)
11. Bobby Mausgrover (No. 88)
12. Wendell Scott*† (No. 34)
13. Frog Fagan† (No. 95)
14. Jabe Thomas (No. 25)
15. Roy Tyner*† (No. 09)
16. John Sears*† (No. 4)
17. Ed Negre* (No.8)
18. Paul Dean Holt* (No. 01)
19. Earl Brooks*† (No. 28)
20. Henley Gray* (No. 19)

* Driver failed to finish race
† signifies that the driver is known to be deceased

== Timeline ==
Section reference:

- Start of race: David Pearson had the pole position to begin the event.
- Lap 4: Earl Brooks' vehicle could not steer properly anymore.
- Lap 56: Richard Petty took over the lead from David Pearson.
- Lap 61: David Pearson took over the lead from Richard Petty.
- Lap 68: Richard Petty took over the lead from David Pearson.
- Lap 73: Paul Dean Holt quit the reason for no apparent reason.
- Lap 76: Ed Negre quit the race for reasons unknown.
- Lap 112: The engine on John Sears' vehicle stopped working in a normal fashion.
- Lap 128: The fuel line stopped working properly on Roy Tyner's vehicle.
- Lap 138: Buddy Baker took over the lead from Richard Petty.
- Lap 157: Richard Petty took over the lead from Buddy Baker.
- Lap 188: David Pearson took over the lead from Richard Petty.
- Lap 229: Wendell Scott had to leave the race due to a flat tire.
- Lap 242: Richard Petty developed engine problems in his vehicle.
- Finish: David Pearson was officially declared the winner of the event.

Preceded by 1968 Beltsville 300	NASCAR Grand National Season; 1968	Succeeded by 1968 World 600
