= Ed Negre =

American racing driver (1927–2014)

- Born: Edward Charles Negre; July 16, 1927; Monett, Missouri, U.S.
- Died: June 4, 2014 (aged 86); Kelso, Washington, U.S.

NASCAR Cup Series career
- 338 races run over 17 years
- Best finish: 12th (1971)
- First race: 1955 untitled race (Bay Meadows)
- Last race: 1979 Southern 500 (Darlington)
Wins	Top tens	Poles
0	26	0

Ed Negre (July 16, 1927 – June 4, 2014) was an American NASCAR Winston Cup Series driver who raced from 1955 to 1979.

== Career ==
Negre led 202 laps out of the 64,857 laps that he raced in his career – the equivalent of 6,545.7 miles (10,534.3 km). His total career earnings were US$344,180. While his average starting position was 23.9, 21.7 was Negre's average finishing position. The number 8 was the number that he would use the most during his career. He is famous for fielding the first Cup ride for Dale Earnhardt in the No. 8 car at the 1975 World 600. However, he would also get the most DNFs (37) while competing in the No. 8 machine. Negre got 44 top-twenty finishes while competing in the No. 8 car.

== Motorsports career results ==
=== NASCAR ===
(key) (Bold – Pole position awarded by qualifying time. Italics – Pole position earned by points standings or practice time. * – Most laps led.)

==== Grand National Series ====
NASCAR Grand National Series results
Year	Team	No.	Make	1	2	3	4	5	6	7	8	9	10	11	12	13	14	15	16	17	18	19	20	21	22	23	24	25	26	27	28	29	30	31	32	33	34	35	36	37	38	39	40	41	42	43	44	45	46	47	48	49	50	51	52	53	54	55	56	NGNC	Pts	Ref
1955	Beryl Jackson	96	Olds	TCS	PBS	JSP	DAB	OSP	CLB	HBO	NWS	MGY	LAN	CLT	HCY	ASF	TUS	MAR	RCH	NCF	FOR	LIN	MCF	FON	AIR	CLT	PIF	CLB	AWS	MOR	ALS	NYF	SAN; 9	CLT	NCF	MAS	RSP	DAR	MGY	LAN	RSP	GPS	MAS	CLB	MAR	LVP	NWS	HBO												83rd	-	
1956	Negre Racing	88	Olds	HCY	CLT	WSS	PBS	ASF	DAB	PBS	WIL	ATL	NWS	LAN	RCH	CLB	CON	GPS	HCY	HBO	MAR	LIN	CLT	POR; 4																																				48th	952	
1956	Negre Racing	98	Olds																						EUR; 15	NYF	MER	MAS	CLT	MCF																														48th	952	
1956	Negre Racing	6	Olds																												POR; 5	AWS	RSP	PIF																										48th	952	
1956	Negre Racing	98N	Olds																																CSF; DNQ	CHI	CCF	MGY	OKL	ROA	OBS										POR; 6	CLB	HBO	NWP	CLT	CCF	MAR	HCY	WIL	48th	952	
1956	Negre Racing	88N	Olds																																							SAN; 10	NOR	PIF	MYB	POR	DAR	CSH	CLT	LAN										48th	952	
1957	Negre Racing	80	Olds	WSS; 33	CON	TIC	DAB	CON	WIL	HBO	AWS	NWS	LAN	CLT	PIF	GBF																																												NA	0	
1957	Negre Racing	98	Olds														POR; 14	CCF	RCH	MAR		EUR; 5	LIN	LCS	ASP	NWP	CLB	CPS	PIF	JAC	RSP	CLT	MAS	POR; 7	HCY	NOR	LCS	GLN																						NA	0	
1957	Negre Racing	98N	Olds																		POR; 19																																							NA	0	
1957	Negre Racing	96N	Olds																																				KPC; 8	LIN	OBS	MYB	DAR	NYF	AWS	CSF	SCF	LAN	CLB	CCF	CLT	MAR	NBR	CON	NWS	GBF				NA	0	
1961		14	Ford	CLT	JSP	DAY	DAY	DAY	PIF	AWS	HMS; 22	ATL	GPS	HBO	BGS	MAR	NWS	CLB	HCY	RCH	MAR	DAR	CLT	CLT	RSD	ASP; 7	CLT	PIF	BIR	GPS	BGS	NOR	HAS	STR	DAY	ATL	CLB	MBS	BRI	NSV	BGS	AWS	RCH	SBO	DAR	HCY	RCH	CSF	ATL	MAR	NWS	CLT	BRI	GPS	HBO					113th	-	
1967	Negre Racing	8	Ford	AUG	RSD	DAY	DAY	DAY	AWS	BRI	GPS	BGS	ATL	CLB	HCY	NWS	MAR	SVH	RCH	DAR	BLV	LGY	CLT	ASH; 16	MGR	SMR	BIR	CAR; 20	GPS; 13	MGY	DAY	TRN; 32	OXF; 12	FDA; 26	ISP; 27	BRI	SMR; 33	NSV; 23	ATL; 42	BGS	CLB	SVH					HBO; 23	MAR	NWS; 32	CLT										49th	3578	
1967	Ralph Murphy	31	Ford																																								DAR; 43	HCY	RCH	BLV														49th	3578	
1967	GC Spencer Racing	49	Plymouth																																																CAR; 12	AWS								49th	3578	
1968	Negre Racing	8	Ford	MGR	MGY	RSD	DAY	BRI	RCH	ATL; 38	HCY	GPS; 21	CLB; 22	NWS	MAR; 37	AUG	AWS	DAR; 31	BLV; 18	LGY; 17	CLT	ASH; 11	MGR; 28	SMR	BIR	CAR; 37	GPS; 13	DAY	ISP; 15	OXF; 12	FDA; 10	TRN; 32	BRI	SMR	NSV	ATL	CLB; 19	BGS; 12	AWS; 15	SBO	LGY; 13	DAR	HCY; 20	RCH; 21	BLV	HBO	MAR	NWS	AUG; 17	CLT; 29	CAR	JFC; 20								31st	928	
1969	Negre Racing	8	Ford	MGR; 18	MGY; 17	RSD	DAY	DAY	DAY	CAR; 16	AUG; 9	BRI	ATL; 26	CLB	HCY	GPS; 18	RCH; 19	NWS; 29	MAR; 21	AWS; 24	DAR; 14	BLV; 21	LGY; 21																																					27th	1465	
1969	Don Tarr	0	Chevy																					CLT; 44	MGR	SMR	MCH	KPT	GPS	NCF	DAY																										TWS; 35			27th	1465	
1969	Neil Castles	86	Plymouth																													DOV; 31		TRN; 32	BLV	BRI	NSV	SMR																						27th	1465	
1969	Neil Castles	86	Dodge																														TPN; 30																											27th	1465	
1969	GC Spencer Racing	8	Plymouth																																				ATL; 37	MCH; 32	SBO; 17	BGS; 17	AWS; 6	DAR; 35	HCY	RCH; 9	TAL; DNQ	CLB; 22	MAR; 39	NWS	CLT	SVH; 12	AUG; 28	CAR; 8	JFC	MGR; 19				27th	1465	
1970	Negre Racing	8	Ford	RSD	DAY	DAY	DAY	RCH	CAR; 35	SVH	ATL; 23	BRI; 19	TAL	NWS; 26	CLB; 21	DAR; DNQ	BLV; 25	LGY; 19	CLT	SMR; 21	MAR; 23	MCH; 25	RSD	HCY; 12	KPT	GPS; 9	DAY; 37	AST; 12	TPN; 15	TRN; 31	BRI	SMR; 23	NSV; 17	ATL; 23	CLB; 18	ONA; 12	MCH; 23	TAL; 45	BGS; 21	SBO; 16	DAR; 36	HCY	RCH; 28	DOV; 28	NCF; 16	NWS; 22	CLT	MAR; 22	MGR	CAR	LGY									26th	1413	
1971	Negre Racing	8	Dodge	RSD	DAY	DAY; 26	DAY; DNQ																																																					12th	2528	
1971	Negre Racing	8	Ford					ONT; DNQ	RCH; 21	CAR; 16	HCY; 19	BRI; DNQ		CLB; 24		SMR; 27			DAR; 14	SBO; 12	TAL; 24	ASH; 15	KPT; 13		DOV; 16	MCH; 23	RSD; 38	HOU; 11	GPS; 16		BRI; 25	AST; 10	ISP; 19	TRN; 18	NSV; 11	ATL; 36	BGS; 17	ONA; 22	MCH; 36	TAL; 28	CLB; 21		DAR; 17	MAR; DNQ		DOV; 15	CAR; 16	MGR; 21	RCH; 18	NWS; 16	TWS; 44									12th	2528	
1971	Dalton Racing	7	Ford									BRI; 23	ATL																																															12th	2528	
1971	GC Spencer Racing	49	Plymouth												GPS; 17			MAR; 30																																										12th	2528	
1971	Brooks Racing	28	Ford														NWS; 18																																											12th	2528	
1971	Buster Davis	04	Plymouth																					CLT; 20																																				12th	2528	
1971	Junior Fields	91	Chevy																											DAY; 36												HCY; 8		MAR; 17	CLT; 19															12th	2528	

==== Winston Cup Series ====
NASCAR Winston Cup Series results
Year	Team	No.	Make	1	2	3	4	5	6	7	8	9	10	11	12	13	14	15	16	17	18	19	20	21	22	23	24	25	26	27	28	29	30	31	NWCC	Pts	Ref
1972	Negre Racing	8	Ford	RSD; 27	DAY; DNQ																														21st	4696.89	
1972	Negre Racing	8	Chevy			RCH; 30																													21st	4696.89	
1972	Negre Racing	8	Dodge				ONT; DNQ	CAR; 14	ATL; 18	BRI; 22	DAR; 24	NWS; 22	MAR; 30	TAL; 15	CLT	DOV; 31	MCH; 21	RSD; 37	TWS; 28	DAY	BRI; 17	TRN; 17	ATL; 25	TAL; 39	MCH; 22	NSV	DAR; 14	RCH; 15	DOV; 17	MAR; 18		CLT; 44	CAR; 17	TWS; 25	21st	4696.89	
1972	Arrington Racing	37	Dodge																												NWS; 22				21st	4696.89	
1973	Negre Racing	8	Mercury	RSD	DAY; 17	RCH			ATL; 24	NWS; 19	DAR; 20	MAR; 22		NSV; 27																					18th	4942.55	
1973	Sears Racing	4	Dodge				CAR; 16	BRI							CLT; 19										DAR; 26										18th	4942.55	
1973	Negre Racing	8	Dodge										TAL; 11			DOV; 33	TWS; 37	RSD	MCH; 18	DAY; 29	BRI; 6	ATL; 18	TAL; 25	NSV; 5		RCH; 21	DOV; 11	NWS; 22	MAR; 26		CAR; 21				18th	4942.55	
1973	Negre Racing	08	Mercury												CLT; DNQ																				18th	4942.55	
1973	Brown Racing	44	Chevy																											CLT; 27					18th	4942.55	
1974	Negre Racing	8	Dodge	RSD	DAY; DNQ	RCH; 24	CAR; 22	BRI; 11	ATL; 22	DAR; 24	NWS; 17	MAR; 26	TAL; 34	NSV	DOV; 14	CLT	RSD; 23	MCH; 31	DAY; 26	BRI; 13	NSV; 29	ATL; 25	POC; 20	TAL; 14		DAR; 21	RCH; 20	DOV; 11	NWS; 30	MAR; 17	CLT; 17	CAR; 28	ONT; 23		23rd	534.29	
1974	Ulrich Racing	40	Chevy																						MCH; 21										23rd	534.29	
1975	Negre Racing	8	Dodge	RSD; 9	DAY; DNQ	RCH; 10	CAR; 7	BRI; 13	ATL	NWS; 19	DAR; 31			NSV; 24			RSD; 28	MCH; 27		NSV; 15	POC; 14	TAL; 18	MCH; 33	DAR; DNQ	DOV; 11	NWS; 17		CLT; 30	RCH; 22	CAR; 12	BRI; 11	ATL; 10	ONT; 40		17th	2982	
1975	Warren Racing	79	Dodge		DAY; 14																														17th	2982	
1975	Dalton Racing	7	Ford									MAR; 13	TAL; 32																						17th	2982	
1975	Marcis Auto Racing	2	Dodge												DOV; 31	CLT; 32			DAY; 12																17th	2982	
1975	Miller Racing	91	Chevy																					DAR; 30											17th	2982	
1975	Champion Racing	10	Ford																								MAR; 21								17th	2982	
1976	Negre Racing	8	Dodge	RSD	DAY; 13	CAR; 9	RCH; 13	BRI; 8	ATL; 13	NWS; 17	DAR; 28			NSV; 19	DOV; 34	CLT; 27	RSD; 24	MCH; 17		NSV; 25	POC; 11	TAL; 27	MCH; 30	BRI; 29	DAR; 26	RCH; 27	DOV; 15		NWS; 25	CLT; 37	CAR; 13	ATL	ONT; 12		19th	2709	
1976	Gray Racing	19	Chevy									MAR; 30	TAL; 32																						19th	2709	
1976	Dalton Racing	7	Chevy																DAY; 37																19th	2709	
1976	Langley Racing	64	Ford																									MAR; 22							19th	2709	
1977	Negre Racing	8	Dodge	RSD; 27	DAY; 29	RCH; 15	CAR; 13	ATL; DNQ	NWS; 28	DAR; 24	BRI; 25	MAR; 25	TAL; 41	NSV	DOV; 15	CLT; 35	RSD	MCH	DAY	NSV	POC; 16	TAL	MCH; 31	BRI; 12	DAR; 11	RCH; 16	DOV; 15	MAR; 24	NWS; 17	CLT; 22	CAR; 24	ATL; 35	ONT; 27		22nd	2214	
1977	Sisco Racing	16	Chevy					ATL; 39																											22nd	2214	
1978	Negre Racing	8	Dodge	RSD; DNQ	DAY; DNQ	RCH; 21	CAR; 29	ATL; 25	BRI; 10	DAR	NWS; 15	MAR; 19	TAL; 28	DOV; 35	CLT	NSV; 27	RSD	MCH; 35	DAY	NSV	POC	TAL	MCH; 18				DOV; 15	MAR; 18	NWS; 20		CAR; 35				28th	1857	
1978	Arrington Racing	7	Dodge																					BRI; 29											28th	1857	
1978	Negre Racing	8	Chrysler																						DAR; 21										28th	1857	
1978	Negre Racing	1	Chrysler																							RCH; 30									28th	1857	
1978	Negre Racing	81	Chrysler																											CLT; 21		ATL; 26			28th	1857	
1978	Negre Racing	18	Chrysler																														ONT; 21		28th	1857	
1979	Negre Racing	8	Chrysler	RSD	DAY	CAR	RCH	ATL	NWS	BRI	DAR; 18	MAR	TAL; 13	NSV	DOV	CLT	TWS	RSD	MCH	DAY	NSV	POC	TAL	MCH	BRI	DAR; 20	RCH	DOV	MAR	CLT	NWS	CAR	ATL	ONT	51st	336	

===== Daytona 500 =====
Year	Team	Manufacturer	Start	Finish
1971	Negre Racing	Dodge	DNQ	
1972	Negre Racing	Ford	DNQ	
1973	Negre Racing	Mercury	28	17
1974	Negre Racing	Dodge	DNQ	
1975	Negre Racing	Dodge	DNQ	
1975	Warren Racing	Dodge	26	14
1976	Negre Racing	Dodge	42	13
1977	Negre Racing	Dodge	22	29
1978	Negre Racing	Dodge	DNQ	
