= 1969 American 500 =

Auto race run in North Carolina in 1969

Race details
- Race 51 of 54 in the 1969 NASCAR Grand National Series season
- Layout of Rockingham Speedway
- Date: October 26, 1969
- Official name: American 500
- Location: North Carolina Motor Speedway, Rockingham, North Carolina
- Course: Permanent racing facility
- Course length: 1.017 miles (1.636 km)
- Distance: 492 laps, 500 mi (804 km)
- Weather: Mild with temperatures reaching a high of 73.4 °F (23.0 °C); wind speeds reaching a maximum speed of 1.90 miles per hour (3.06 km/h)
- Average speed: 111.938 miles per hour (180.147 km/h)
- Attendance: 33,800

Pole position
Driver	Charlie Glotzbach	Nichels Engineering

Most laps led
Driver	LeeRoy Yarbrough	Junior Johnson & Associates
- Laps: 213

Winner
No. 98	LeeRoy Yarbrough	Junior Johnson & Associates

Television in the United States
- Network: untelevised
- Announcers: none

The 1969 American 500 was a NASCAR Grand National Series event that was held on October 26, 1969, at North Carolina Motor Speedway in Rockingham, North Carolina.

A lot of the more notable NASCAR Cup Series drivers of this era failed to finish the race. Richard Petty tore his car up hitting the wall and the repairs were not enough to continue.

== Background ==
North Carolina Motor Speedway was opened as a flat, one-mile oval on October 31, 1965. In 1969, the track was extensively reconfigured to a high-banked, D-shaped oval just over one mile in length. In 1997, North Carolina Motor Speedway merged with Penske Motorsports, and was renamed North Carolina Speedway. Shortly thereafter, the infield was reconfigured, and competition on the infield road course, mostly by the SCCA, was discontinued. Currently, the track is home to the Fast Track High Performance Driving School,

== Summary ==
It took four hours and twenty-eight minutes to resolve 492 laps with LeeRoy Yarbrough emerging over David Pearson by 1½ laps. The other drivers in the top ten were: Buddy Baker, Dave Marcis, John Sears, Dick Brooks, Hoss Ellington, Ed Negre, Wendell Scott, and Neil Castles. Seven cautions were handed out by NASCAR officials for 66 laps. More than 33,000 people would attend this live racing event. Charlie Glotzbach would qualify for the pole position with a speed of 136.972 miles per hour (220.435 km/h) while the average race speed was 111.938 miles per hour (180.147 km/h).

John Kennedy would receive the last-place finish due to a one-car crash on lap 17. This would be the 51st race out of the 54 officially sanctioned racing events of the 1969 NASCAR Grand National Series in addition to being the first race done with the present-day configuration for North Carolina Motor Speedway. Lennie Pond would make his NASCAR debut here.

The transition to purpose-built racecars began in the early 1960s and occurred gradually over that decade. Changes made to the sport by the late 1960s brought an end to the "strictly stock" vehicles of the 1950s.

Ten notable crew chiefs were in attendance for the race; including Cotton Owens, Dick Hutcherson, Banjo Matthews and Harry Hyde.

=== Qualifying ===
Grid	No.	Driver	Manufacturer	Owner
1	99	Charlie Glotzbach	'69 Dodge	Ray Nichels
2	22	Bobby Allison	'69 Dodge	Mario Rossi
3	21	Cale Yarborough	'69 Mercury	Wood Brothers
4	17	David Pearson	'69 Ford	Holman-Moody Racing
5	27	Donnie Allison	'69 Ford	Banjo Matthews
6	6	Buddy Baker	'69 Dodge	Cotton Owens
7	43	Richard Petty	'69 Ford	Petty Enterprises
8	71	Bobby Isaac	'69 Dodge	Nord Krauskopf
9	98	LeeRoy Yarbrough	'69 Ford	Junior Johnson
10	30	Dave Marcis	'69 Dodge	Milt Lunda
11	88	Richard Brickhouse	'69 Dodge	Bill Ellis
12	67	Buddy Arrington	'69 Dodge	Buddy Arrington
13	32	Dick Brooks	'69 Plymouth	Dick Brooks
14	4	John Sears	'69 Ford	L.G. DeWitt
15	48	James Hylton	'69 Dodge	James Hylton

Failed to qualify: Ed Hessert (#15)

== Timeline ==
Section reference:

- Start: Charlie Glotzbach was the lead driver as the green flag was waved in the air.
- Lap 20: A two-car accident brought out a caution that lasted until lap 27.
- Lap 29: The driveshaft on Henley Gray's vehicle ceased effective operations on this lap.
- Lap 40: Clyde Lynn overheated his racing vehicle.
- Lap 72: The rear end came loose off Buddy Arrington's vehicle.
- Lap 125: Richard Brickhouse was involved in an accident off turn two.
- Lap 147: A two-car accident brought out a caution that lasted until lap 156.
- Lap 168: Cale Yarborough was involved in an accident off turn two.
- Lap 183: James Hylton blew his vehicle's engine off turn one.
- Lap 195: Buddy Young was involved in an accident off turn four.
- Lap 239: The wheel bearing came loose off Dub Simpson's vehicle.
- Lap 283: Charlie Glotzbach blew his vehicle's engine off turn three.
- Lap 304: Elmo Langley's brakes stopped working on this lap.
- Lap 313: The water pumps on Earl Brooks' vehicle ceased functioning.
- Lap 388: The suspension on E.J. Trivette's vehicle stopped working properly.
- Lap 391: The timing chain came loose off of Bobby Isaac's vehicle.
- Finish: LeeRoy Yarbrough was officially declared the winner of the race.

Preceded by 1969 untitled race at Augusta Speedway	NASCAR Grand National Season; 1969	Succeeded by 1969 Jeffco 200

Preceded by 1968	American 500 races 1969	Succeeded by 1970
