= 1968 Beltsville 300 =

Auto race held at Beltsville Speedway in 1968

Race details
- Race 16 of 49 in the 1968 NASCAR Grand National Series season
- Date: May 17, 1968; 56 years ago
- Official name: Beltsville 300
- Location: Beltsville Speedway, Beltsville, Maryland
- Course: Permanent racing facility
- Course length: 0.836 km (0.500 miles)
- Distance: 300 laps, 150.0 mi (225.0 km)
- Weather: Warm with temperatures of 80.1 °F (26.7 °C); wind speeds of 19 miles per hour (31 km/h)
- Average speed: 74.844 miles per hour (120.450 km/h)
- Attendance: 8,700

Pole position
Driver	Richard Petty	Petty Enterprises

Most laps led
Driver	Richard Petty	Petty Enterprises
- Laps: 158

Winner
No. 17	David Pearson	Holman-Moody

Television in the United States
- Network: untelevised
- Announcers: none

The 1968 Beltsville 300 was a NASCAR Grand National Series event that was held on May 17, 1968, at Beltsville Speedway in Beltsville, Maryland.

The transition to purpose-built racecars began in the early 1960s and occurred gradually over that decade. Changes made to the sport by the late 1960s brought an end to the "strictly stock" vehicles of the 1950s.

== Background ==
Beltsville Speedway was specially designed with banked turns for stock car racing. Originally known as the "Baltimore-Washington Speedway", this track received its final name in its 19th month of operation. The track hosted modified stock car racing vehicles alongside the other NASCAR series. Wednesday nights were the original night for racing but the schedule eventually added Friday night racing. Ten Grand National races were raced there including the popular Beltsville 300 series of races.

== Race report ==
It took two hours for David Pearson (in his Holman-Moody owned '68 Ford Torino) to defeat Bobby Isaac (in his '67 Dodge Charger) by one lap and five seconds in front of 8,700 people. The majority of the starting grid would be driving Ford vehicles while Dodge, Chevrolet, Buick, Oldsmobile and Plymouth made up the minority of the racing vehicles. Notable crew chiefs who participated in the event were Ray Hicks, Jake Elder, Frankie Scott, Dale Inman and Harry Hyde.

Notable speeds were: 74.844 miles or 120.450 kilometres per hour as the average speed and 83.604 miles or 134.548 kilometres per hour as the pole position speed. The track was a paved oval track spanning 0.500 miles or 0.805 kilometres. Three hundred laps were raced on this track for a grand total of 150.0 miles or 241.4 kilometres. There was one Canadian participant named Frog Fagan; he started in 20th place and finished the race in 22nd place.

Total winnings for this race were $6,800 ($61,486 when considering inflation); David Pearson would receive $1,400 ($12,659 when considering inflation) while last-place finisher Wendell Scott would receive a meager $100 ($904 when considering inflation). Tom Pistone was the start and park car for this race; he quit the race for reasons unknown. Other notable racers who participated included Wendell Scott, Buck Baker, and J.D. McDuffie.

=== Qualifying ===
Grid	No.	Driver	Manufacturer	Owner
1	43	Richard Petty	'68 Plymouth	Petty Enterprises
2	17	David Pearson	'68 Ford	Holman-Moody Racing
3	5	Pete Hamilton	'68 Ford	Rocky Hinton
4	10	Bill Champion	'66 Ford	Bill Champion
5	48	James Hylton	'67 Dodge	James Hylton
6	4	John Sears	'67 Ford	L.G. DeWitt
7	71	Bobby Isaac	'67 Dodge	Nord Krauskopf
8	3	Buddy Baker	'67 Dodge	Ray Fox
9	55	Tom Pistone	'66 Ford	Lyle Stelter
10	25	Jabe Thomas	'67 Ford	Don Robertson
11	07	George Davis	'67 Chevrolet	George Davis
12	20	Clyde Lynn	'67 Mercury	Clyde Lynn
13	64	Elmo Langley	'66 Ford	Elmo Langley / Henry Woodfield
14	70	J.D. McDuffie	'67 Buick	J.D. McDuffie
15	28	Earl Brooks	'66 Ford	Earl Brooks
16	8	Ed Negre	'67 Ford	Ed Negre
17	01	Paul Dean Holt	'67 Ford	Dennis Holt
18	34	Wendell Scott	'66 Ford	Wendell Scott
19	09	Roy Tyner	'66 Chevrolet	Roy Tyner
20	95	Frog Fagan	'66 Ford	Henley Gray
21	19	Henley Gray	'66 Ford	Henley Gray
22	88	Buck Baker	'67 Oldsmobile	Buck Baker
23	06	Neil Castles	'67 Plymouth	Neil Castles

== Finishing order ==
Section reference:

1. David Pearson (No. 17)
2. Bobby Isaac (No. 71)
3. Buddy Baker (No. 3)
4. James Hylton (No. 48)
5. John Sears (No. 4)
6. Jabe Thomas (No. 25)
7. Neil Castles (No. 06)
8. Roy Tyner (No. 09)
9. Bill Champion (No. 10)
10. Henley Gray (No. 19)
11. Earl Brooks (No. 28)
12. Paul Dean Holt (No. 01)
13. Elmo Langley (No. 64)
14. Richard Petty (No. 43)
15. J.D. McDuffie (No. 70)
16. Tom Pistone (No. 55)
17. George Davis (No. 07)
18. Ed Negre (No. 8)
19. Pete Hamilton (No. 5)
20. Buck Baker (No. 88)
21. Clyde Lynn (No. 20)
22. Frog Fagan (No. 95)
23. Wendell Scott (No. 34)

== Timeline ==
Section reference:

- Start of race: Richard Petty starts the race with the pole position.
- Lap 3: Wendell Scott's bad oil pressure made him the last-place finisher.
- Lap 10: The head gasket on Frog Fagan's vehicle developed problems, forcing the Canadian to accept a 22nd-place finish.
- Lap 14: Clyde Lynn had a terminal crash; causing him to leave the race.
- Lap 82: Buck Baker's steering problem ended his day on the track.
- Lap 85: Pete Hamilton had a terminal crash, forcing him to leave the event.
- Lap 112: George Davis' rear end became a problem, forcing him to be pulled off for safety reasons.
- Lap 115: Tom Pistone left the race for reasons unknown.
- Lap 122: An oil leak ended J.D. McDuffie's hope of finishing the race.
- Lap 158: Richard Petty's engine acted up, ending his day on the track.
- Lap 159: David Pearson takes over the lead from Richard Petty.
- Lap 171: Elmo Langley's engine became faulty, bringing his day to an end.
- Lap 231: Bobby Isaac takes over the lead from David Pearson.
- Lap 243: David Pearson takes over the lead from Bobby Isaac.
- Lap 282: Jabe Thomas' engine problems forced him out of the race.
- Finish: David Pearson was officially declared the winner of the event.

Preceded by 1968 Rebel 400	NASCAR Grand National Season; 1968	Succeeded by 1968 Tidewater 250
