= 1973 Medal of Honor Firecracker 400 =

Auto race held at Daytona International Speedway in 1973

Race details
- Race 17 of 28 in the 1973 NASCAR Winston Cup Series
- 1973 Firecracker 400 program cover
- Date: July 4, 1973
- Official name: Medal of Honor Firecracker 400
- Location: Daytona International Speedway, Daytona Beach, Florida
- Course length: 2.500 miles (4.023 km)
- Distance: 160 laps, 400 mi (643 km)
- Weather: Temperatures between 72.9 °F (22.7 °C) and 89.1 °F (31.7 °C); wind speeds of 11.8 miles per hour (19.0 km/h)
- Average speed: 158.468 mph (255.030 km/h)
- Attendance: 60,000

Pole position
Driver	Bobby Allison	Allison Racing

Most laps led
Driver	David Pearson	Wood Brothers Racing
- Laps: 51

Winner
No. 21	David Pearson	Wood Brothers Racing

The 1973 Medal of Honor Firecracker 400 was a NASCAR Winston Cup Series race that took place on July 4, 1973, at Daytona International Speedway in Daytona Beach, Florida.

This race - and the 1969 and 1971 runnings of this race - was actually called the "Medal of Honor Firecracker 400", in an effort to honor Congressional Medal of Honor recipients.

== Race report ==
This was the first race with new rules regarding carburetor restrictors. It was widely assumed that these rules helped volume production wedge engines, especially that used by Chevrolet.

This race eventually became Marty Robbins' most iconic race during his career in NASCAR. While he would start in 36th place (out of the 40 drivers who made up the racing grid), he would finish the race in eighth place, seven laps down. J.D. McDuffie ended up being the last-place finisher of this race due to an engine problem on lap 2 of 160. It took more than 160 minutes and two caution flags for David Pearson to defeat Richard Petty in front of sixty thousand fans. Six car lengths was the distance between Petty and Pearson. Bobby Allison secured the pole position at 179.619 miles per hour (289.069 km/h) during qualifying.

The race averaged 158.468 miles per hour (255.030 km/h). Engine problems took numerous other drivers out of the race. All competitors (except for Canadian-born Vic Parsons) were born in the United States. Mercury, Dodge, and Chevrolet made up the majority of the grid. Bobby Allison, Cale Yarborough, Richard Petty and David Pearson were the only lap leaders. The Chevrolet vehicles dominated the race, but after Yarborough and Allison retired it was David Pearson's show.

Notable crew chiefs in the race were Tim Brew, Jake Elder, Travis Carter, Harry Hyde, Dale Inman, Tom Vandiver, and Bud Moore.

Vic Parsons scored his best NASCAR finish in seventh place. Gordon Johncock, fresh from his Indy 500 win, finished 4th at this race.

The winner of the race won $16,100 ($114,039.66 when considering inflation) while the last-place winner received $1,270 ($8,995.67 when considering inflation). All the prize winnings from this race were $105,080 ($744,303.54 when considering inflation).

=== Qualifying ===
Grid	No.	Driver	Manufacturer	Owner
1	12	Bobby Allison	'73 Chevrolet	Bobby Allison
2	11	Cale Yarborough	'73 Chevrolet	Richard Howard
3	15	Bobby Isaac	'73 Ford	Bud Moore
4	43	Richard Petty	'73 Dodge	Petty Enterprises
5	14	Coo Coo Marlin	'72 Chevrolet	H.B. Cunningham
6	21	David Pearson	'71 Mercury	Wood Brothers
7	72	Benny Parsons	'73 Chevrolet	L.G. DeWitt
8	31	Jim Vandiver	'72 Dodge	O.L. Nixon
9	95	Darrell Waltrip	'71 Mercury	Darrell Waltrip
10	88	Donnie Allison	'73 Chevrolet	DiGard

== Finishing order ==
1. David Pearson
2. Richard Petty
3. Buddy Baker
4. Gordon Johncock
5. Benny Parsons
6. Dave Marcis
7. Vic Parsons
8. Marty Robbins
9. Dick Brooks
10. Joe Frasson
11. David Sisco
12. James Hylton
13. Cecil Gordon
14. G.C. Spencer
15. Roy Mayne
16. Elmo Langley
17. Dean Dalton
18. Buddy Arrington
19. Frank Warren
20. Lennie Pond
21. Larry Smith
22. Raymond Williams
23. Henley Gray
24. Bill Champion
25. Darrell Waltrip
26. Walter Ballard
27. Richard Childress
28. Donnie Allison
29. Ed Negre
30. Bobby Allison
31. Jabe Thomas
32. Jim Vandiver
33. John Sears
34. Ed Sczech
35. Dick Simon
36. Cale Yarborough
37. A. J. Foyt
38. Coo Coo Marlin
39. Bobby Isaac
40. J.D. McDuffie

== Timeline ==
Section reference:

- Start: David Pearson officially had the lead position as the green flag was waved, Bobby Allison took over the lead prior to the end of the first lap, Bobby Isaac took over the lead from Bobby Allison.
- Lap 2: J.D. McDuffie fell out with engine failure.
- Lap 4: Bobby Allison took over the lead from Bobby Isaac.
- Lap 5: Cale Yarborough took over the lead from Bobby Isaac.
- Lap 8: Bobby Allison took over the lead from Cale Yarborough.
- Lap 9: Cale Yarborough took over the lead from Bobby Allison.
- Lap 11: Bobby Allison took over the lead from Cale Yarborough.
- Lap 13: Bobby Isaac fell out with engine failure.
- Lap 14: Cale Yarborough took over the lead from Bobby Allison.
- Lap 35: Coo Coo Marlin fell out with engine failure, David Pearson took over the lead from Cale Yarborough.
- Lap 36: Bobby Alliston took over the lead from David Pearson.
- Lap 37: Cale Yarborough took over the lead from Bobby Allison.
- Lap 42: Bobby Allison took over the lead from Cale Yarborough.
- Lap 45: Cale Yarborough took over the lead from Bobby Allison.
- Lap 46: A.J. Foyt managed to lose the rear end of his vehicle.
- Lap 47: Bobby Allison took over the lead from Cale Yarborough.
- Lap 65: Cale Yarborough had a terminal crash.
- Lap 66: David Pearson took over the lead from Bobby Allison.
- Lap 79: Richard Petty took over the lead from David Pearson.
- Lap 82: Dick Simon could not handle his vehicle in a proper manner.
- Lap 83: Bobby Allison took over the lead from Richard Petty.
- Lap 87: An oil leak forced Ed Sczech out of the race.
- Lap 96: Richard Petty took over the lead from Bobby Allison.
- Lap 100: David Pearson took over the lead from Richard Petty.
- Lap 102: John Sears fell out with engine failure, Bobby Allison took over the lead from David Pearson.
- Lap 105: Richard Petty took over the lead from Bobby Allison.
- Lap 110: David Pearson took over the lead from Richard Petty.
- Lap 116: Richard Petty took over the lead from David Pearson.
- Lap 118: Jim Vandiver managed to overheat his vehicle.
- Lap 125: Bobby Allison fell out with engine failure.
- Lap 129: David Pearson took over the lead from Richard Petty.
- Lap 131: Donnie Allison's windshield was severely damaged.
- Lap 132: Richard Childress managed to overheat his vehicle.
- Lap 138: Richard Petty took over the lead from David Pearson.
- Lap 141: David Pearson took over the lead from Richard Petty.
- Finish: David Pearson was officially declared the winner of the event.

Preceded by 1973 Motor State 400	NASCAR Winston Cup Series races 1973	Succeeded by 1973 Volunteer 500

Preceded by 1972	Firecracker 400 races 1973	Succeeded by 1974
