= 1970 Rebel 400 =

Auto race held at Darlington Raceway in 1970

Race details
- Race 10 of 48 in the 1970 NASCAR Grand National Series season
- 1970 Rebel 400 program cover
- Date: May 9, 1970
- Official name: Rebel 400
- Location: Darlington Raceway, Darlington, South Carolina
- Course: Permanent racing facility
- Course length: 1.375 miles (2.213 km)
- Distance: 291 laps, 400.1 mi (643.9 km)
- Weather: Extremely hot with temperatures of 91.9 °F (33.3 °C); wind speeds of 10.9 miles per hour (17.5 km/h)
- Average speed: 129.688 mph (208.713 km/h)

Pole position
Driver	Charlie Glotzbach	Ray Nichels
- Time: 64.360 seconds

Most laps led
Driver	David Pearson	Holman Moody
- Laps: 117

Winner
No. 17	David Pearson	Holman Moody

The 1970 Rebel 400 was a NASCAR Grand National Series event that was held on May 9, 1970, at Darlington Raceway in Darlington, South Carolina. The race is known for a crash involving Richard Petty that inspired NASCAR to implement the window net, a mandatory safety feature in today's NASCAR vehicles.

== Background ==
Darlington Raceway is a race track built for NASCAR racing located near Darlington, South Carolina. It is of a unique, somewhat egg-shaped design, an oval with the ends of very different configurations, a condition which supposedly arose from the proximity of one end of the track to a minnow pond the owner refused to relocate. This situation makes it very challenging for the crews to set up their cars' handling in a way that will be effective at both ends.

Harold Brasington was a retired racer in 1948, who had gotten to know Bill France Sr. while competing against France at the Daytona Beach and Road Course and other dirt tracks in the Southeast and Midwestern United States; he quit racing in the late 1940s to concentrate on farming and his construction business. He began planning a new speedway after he noticed the huge crowds while attending the 1948 Indianapolis 500 and thought, "If Tony Hulman can do it here, I can do it back home." Brasington bought 70 acres from farmer Sherman Ramsey, and started making a race track from a cotton and peanut field. However, he was forced to create an egg-shaped oval with one corner tighter, narrower, and more steeply banked because he promised Ramsey that the new track wouldn't disturb Ramsey's minnow pond at the west side of the property. Brasington was able to make the other turn at the east side of the property wide, sweeping, and flat as he wanted. It took almost a year to build the track.

Brasington made a deal in the summer of 1950 with France to run a 500-mile (800 km) race in Darlington on Labor Day that year. The first Southern 500 carried a record $25,000 purse, and was co-sanctioned by NASCAR and its rival Central States Racing Association. More than 80 entrants showed up for the race. Brasington used a 2-week qualifying scheme similar to the one used at the Indianapolis 500. Brasington was also inspired by Indianapolis when he had the 75-car field aligned in 25 rows of three cars. These practices have been curtailed over the years as NASCAR adopted a more uniform set of guidelines with regard to the number of cars which could qualify for a race. The race was won by Johnny Mantz in a car owned by France.

== Race report ==
David Pearson defeated Dick Brooks by three laps in a race lasting three hours and five minutes; leading to his only win of the 1970 NASCAR Grand National Series season. Bill Seifert finished in last-place due to him quitting the race on lap 3. There were four cautions for a duration of 37 laps. Twenty lead changes were made during the course of the race. Overall, there were three accidents and one accidental spin down turn 4. Bobby Isaac dominated the last half of the race but ended up in third place. Had Richard Petty not crashed his vehicle in the race and dislocated his shoulder in the process, he would have won the NASCAR championship instead of Bobby Isaac due to his consistency during the other races that season. Isaac raced 47 times and Petty raced 40 times during the 1970 NASCAR Cup Series season.

This was Buddy Arrington's first race back after his vicious wreck in the Daytona 500. The Mopar stalwart posted a strong run in his return as he brought his #5 Charger home with a sixth-place finish, his best of the season.

Engine failures dominated a good portion of the race. Five drivers failed to qualify for the event; including two Ford drivers. Cale Yarborough would finish in 13th place despite losing control over his clutch on lap 250. Nearly 13% of the race was run under a caution flag. Each green flag lasted almost 51 laps on average. Paul Connors would make his final professional stock car appearance at this event.

Drivers who failed to qualify for the race were: Ed Negre, Bill Shirey, Dick May, Hoss Ellington and Johnny Halford. Qualifying times ranged from 64.3 seconds to 72.1 seconds; speeds driven at the event ranged from 137.267 mph (220.910 km/h) for the 37th-place driver to 153.822 mph (247.553 km/h) for the pole position driver. Dale Inman was listed as the official crew chief for Pete Hamilton and Richard Petty. Other notable crew chiefs included Banjo Matthews, Harry Hyde and Herb Nab.

=== Results ===
Fin	St	#	Driver	Make	Laps	Led	Status	Pts
1	3	17	David Pearson	'69 Ford	291	117	running	
2	5	32	Dick Brooks	'70 Plymouth	288	0	running	
3	9	71	Bobby Isaac	'69 Dodge	284	77	running	
4	13	48	James Hylton	'69 Ford	282	0	running	
5	8	72	Benny Parsons	'69 Ford	279	0	running	
6	17	5	Buddy Arrington	'69 Dodge	272	0	running	
7	26	37	Don Tarr	'69 Dodge	270	0	running	
8	36	46	Roy Mayne	'69 Chevrolet	267	0	running	
9	21	25	Jabe Thomas	'69 Plymouth	265	0	running	
10	34	54	Bill Dennis	'69 Chevrolet	261	0	running	
11	28	4	John Sears	'69 Dodge	255	0	running	
12	23	19	Henley Gray	'69 Ford	251	0	running	
13	7	27	Cale Yarborough	'69 Ford	250	0	clutch	
14	25	76	Ben Arnold	'69 Ford	242	0	running	
15	6	6	Buddy Baker	'69 Dodge	234	0	engine	
16	29	34	Wendell Scott	'69 Ford	233	0	clutch	
17	19	06	Neil Castles	'69 Dodge	206	0	clutch	
18	12	43	Richard Petty	'70 Plymouth	176	3	crash	
19	4	40	Pete Hamilton	'70 Plymouth	150	3	engine	
20	2	22	Bobby Allison	'69 Dodge	146	85	engine	
21	18	39	Friday Hassler	'69 Chevrolet	144	0	oil leak	
22	1	99	Charlie Glotzbach	'69 Dodge	137	4	overheating	
23	20	10	Bill Champion	'69 Ford	136	0	engine	
24	30	53	Paul Connors	'69 Dodge	134	0	engine	
25	16	49	G.C. Spencer	'69 Plymouth	116	0	engine	
26	10	98	LeeRoy Yarbrough	'69 Ford	107	2	crash	
27	11	79	Frank Warren	'69 Plymouth	96	0	engine	
28	35	84	Bobby Mausgrover	'69 Dodge	73	0	engine	
29	32	24	Cecil Gordon	'68 Ford	67	0	engine	
30	33	89	Butch Hirst	'69 Ford	55	0	overheating	
31	27	64	Elmo Langley	'69 Mercury	37	0	clutch	
32	14	30	Dave Marcis	'69 Dodge	34	0	engine	
33	22	23	Earl Brooks	'69 Plymouth	29	0	vibration	
34	31	68	Larry Baumel	'69 Ford	11	0	windshield	
35	15	31	Jim Vandiver	'69 Dodge	3	0	engine	
36	24	45	Bill Seifert	'69 Ford	3	0	quit	

== Timeline ==
Section reference:

- Start of race: Charlie Glotzbach started the event with the pole position.
- Lap 3: Jim Vandiver's engine gave out on him, Bill Seifert quit the race.
- Lap 5: Bobby Allison took over the lead from Charlie Glotzbach.
- Lap 11: Windshield issues managed to put a hamper on Larry Baumel's day.
- Lap 29: Earl Brooks's vehicle developed bad vibrations, forcing him out of the race.
- Lap 34: Dave Marcis' engine gave out on him.
- Lap 37: Elmo Langley had issues with his vehicle's clutch.
- Lap 67: Bobby Allison took over the lead from LeeRoy Yarbrough, Cecil Gordon's engine gave out on him.
- Lap 73: Bobby Mausgrover's engine gave out on him.
- Lap 82: David Pearson took over the lead from Bobby Allison.
- Lap 96: Frank Warren's engine gave out on him.
- Lap 108: Caution due to LeeRoy Yarbrough's accident, ended on lap 117.
- Lap 113: David Pearson took over the lead from Pete Hamilton.
- Lap 116: G.C. Spencer's engine gave out on him.
- Lap 130: Caution due to a spun tire on turn four, ended on lap 133.
- Lap 132: Bobby Allison took over the lead from David Pearson.
- Lap 134: Paul Connors' engine gave out on him.
- Lap 136: Bill Champion's engine gave out on him.
- Lap 146: Bobby Allison's engine gave out on him.
- Lap 149: Caution due to Pete Hamilton's accident, ended on lap 155.
- Lap 156: Bobby Isaac took over the lead from David Pearson.
- Lap 176: Caution due to Richard Petty's accident, ended on lap 191.
- Lap 181: David Pearson took over the lead from Bobby Isaac.
- Lap 191: Bobby Isaac took over the lead from David Pearson.
- Lap 206: Neil Castles had issues with his vehicle's clutch.
- Lap 233: Wendell Scott had issues with his vehicle's clutch.
- Lap 234: Buddy Baker's engine gave out on him.
- Lap 238: David Pearson took over the lead from Bobby Isaac.
- Lap 250: Cale Yarborough had issues with his vehicle's clutch.
- Lap 256: Bobby Isaac took over the lead from David Pearson.
- Lap 259: David Pearson took over the lead from Bobby Isaac.
- Finish: David Pearson was officially declared the winner of the event.

Preceded by 1970 Columbia 200	NASCAR Grand National races 1970	Succeeded by 1970 Beltsville 300
