= 1970 Greenville 200 =

Auto race held at Greenville-Pickens Speedway in 1970

Race details
- Race 23 of 48 in the 1970 NASCAR Grand National Series season
- Date: June 27, 1970
- Official name: Greenville 200
- Location: Greenville-Pickens Speedway; Greenville, South Carolina, USA
- Course: Permanent racing facility
- Course length: 0.500 miles (0.805 km)
- Distance: 200 laps, 100.000 mi (160.934 km)
- Weather: Very hot with temperatures of 82 °F (28 °C); wind speeds of 5.18 miles per hour (8.34 km/h)
- Average speed: 75.345 miles per hour (121.256 km/h)
- Attendance: 7,000

Pole position
Driver	Bobby Isaac	K&K Insurance Racing

Most laps led
Driver	Bobby Isaac	K&K Insurance Racing
- Laps: 190

Winner
No. 71	Bobby Isaac	K&K Insurance Racing

The 1970 Greenville 200 was a NASCAR Grand National Series event that was held on June 27, 1970, at Greenville-Pickens Speedway in Greenville, South Carolina.

== Race report ==
Seven thousand racing fans were in attendance to see Bobby Isaac defeat Bobby Allison by half a lap. Bobby Allison had to borrow his son Davey's car because he wrecked his car during the previous week. The pole position was earned by the eventual race winner with a qualifying speed of 82.327 miles per hour (132.492 km/h) while the average speed of the race was 75.345 miles per hour (121.256 km/h). It took one hour and thirty-three seconds for the race to reach its conclusion. All twenty-nine competitors were born in the United States of America with no foreign-born drivers, unlike today. Five notable crew chiefs were recorded as participating in the event, including Lee Gordon, Dale Inman and Harry Hyde.

Carburetors were still in wide use in both passenger automobiles and with the NASCAR vehicles during the early 1970s; requiring plenty of physically-intensive labor from the people who would maintain the vehicles between races.

Notable drivers in the field included: Richard Petty, Benny Parsons, Elmo Langley (died of a heart attack after driving the pace car at an exhibition race in Japan), Roy Tyner (murdered in his vehicle), and J.D. McDuffie (killed after colliding with turn 5 at the 1991 Budweiser At The Glen race at Watkins Glen International). The winner's purse was considered to be $1,500 ($12,145 when adjusted for inflation).

The race car drivers still had to commute to the races using the same stock cars that competed in a typical weekend's race through a policy of homologation (and under their own power). This policy was in effect until roughly 1975. By 1980, NASCAR had completely stopped tracking the year model of all the vehicles and most teams did not take stock cars to the track under their own power anymore.

=== Qualifying ===
Grid	No.	Driver	Manufacturer	Owner
1	71	Bobby Isaac	'70 Dodge	Nord Krauskopf
2	43	Richard Petty	'70 Plymouth	Petty Enterprises
3	22	Bobby Allison	'69 Dodge	Bobby Allison
4	32	Dick Brooks	'69 Plymouth	Dick Brooks
5	72	Benny Parsons	'69 Ford	L.G. DeWitt
6	06	Neil Castles	'69 Dodge	Neil Castles
7	57	Johnny Halford	'69 Plymouth	Ervin Pruett
8	48	James Hylton	'69 Ford	James Hylton
9	26	Earl Brooks	'69 Ford	Earl Brooks
10	8	Ed Negre	'69 Ford	Ed Negre
11	79	Frank Warren	'69 Plymouth	Frank Warren
12	34	Wendell Scott	'69 Ford	Wendell Scott
13	76	Ben Arnold	'68 Ford	Ben Arnold
14	25	Jabe Thomas	'69 Plymouth	Ben Robertson
15	24	Cecil Gordon	'68 Ford	Cecil Gordon
16	4	John Sears	'68 Ford	L.G. DeWitt
17	64	Elmo Langley	'68 Ford	Elmo Langley
18	45	Bill Seifert	'69 Ford	Bill Seifert
19	10	Bill Champion	'68 Ford	Bill Champion
20	74	Bill Shirey	'69 Plymouth	Bill Shirey
21	30	Dave Marcis	'69 Dodge	Dave Marcis
22	47	Raymond Williams	'68 Ford	Bill Seifert
23	19	Henley Gray	'68 Ford	Henley Gray
24	70	J.D. McDuffie	'69 Buick	J.D. McDuffie
25	04	Ken Meisenhelder	'69 Chevrolet	Ken Meisenhelder
26	92	Roy Tyner	'70 Pontiac	Roy Tyner
27	82	John Jennings	'69 Ford	Mack Sellers
28	97	Lee Gordon	'68 Ford	Cecil Gordon
29	12	Pete Hazelwood	'68 Ford	Pete Hazelwood

== Finishing order ==
Section reference:

1. Bobby Isaac† (No. 71)
2. Bobby Allison (No. 22)
3. Dick Brooks† (No. 32)
4. James Hylton (No. 48)
5. Benny Parsons† (No. 72)
6. Elmo Langley† (No. 64)
7. Jabe Thomas† (No. 25)
8. Bill Champion† (No. 10)
9. Ed Negre (No. 8)
10. Ken Meisenhelder (No. 04)
11. Wendell Scott† (No. 34)
12. J.D. McDuffie† (No.70)
13. Ben Arnold (No. 76)
14. Neil Castles* (No. 06)
15. Bill Seifert (No. 45)
16. Lee Gordon (No. 97)
17. Johnny Halford* (No. 57)
18. Roy Tyner† (No. 92)
19. Richard Petty* (No. 43)
20. Dave Marcis (No. 30)
21. Raymond Williams* (No. 47)
22. Frank Warren* (No. 79)
23. Henley Gray* (No. 19)
24. John Sears*† (No. 4)
25. Earl Brooks* (No. 26)
26. Cecil Gordon*† (No. 24)
27. Pete Hazelwood* (No. 12)
28. Bill Shirey* (No. 74)
29. John Jennings* (No. 82)

† signifies that the driver is known to be deceased
* Driver failed to finish race

== Timeline ==
Section reference:

- Start of race: Bobby Isaac started the race with the pole position.
- Lap 3: John Jennings managed to overheat his vehicle.
- Lap 10: Bill Shirey managed to overheat his vehicle.
- Lap 23: Oil pressure issues put Pete Hazelwood out to pasture for the day.
- Lap 34: Transmission issues forced Cecil Gordon to pull out for the rest of the day.
- Lap 37: Earl Brooks encountered braking issues, forcing him to exit the race.
- Lap 40: Steering issues ended John Sears' race.
- Lap 46: Henley Gray managed to overheat his vehicle.
- Lap 63: Raymond Williams had to pull out when his vehicle overheated, and Frank Warren when he lost the rear end of his vehicle.
- Lap 124: Richard Petty takes over the lead from Bobby Isaac.
- Lap 125: Bobby Allison takes over the lead from Richard Petty.
- Lap 134: Bobby Isaac takes over the lead from Bobby Allison.
- Lap 137: Richard Petty had a terminal crash, causing him not to finish the race.
- Lap 163: Johnny Halford developed problems with his oil pressure, forcing him out of the race.
- Lap 175: The rear end of Neil Castles' vehicle fell off, ending his day on the track.
- Finish: Bobby Isaac was officially declared the winner of the event.

Preceded by 1970 Kingsport 100	NASCAR Grand National races 1970	Succeeded by 1970 Firecracker 400
