= 1969 Sandlapper 200 =

Auto race held at Columbia Speedway in 1969

Race details
- Race 45 of 54 in the 1969 NASCAR Grand National Series season
- Date: September 18, 1969
- Official name: Sandlapper 200
- Location: Columbia Speedway, Columbia, South Carolina
- Course: Permanent racing facility
- Course length: 0.804 km (0.500 miles)
- Distance: 200 laps, 100 mi (160 km)
- Weather: Very hot with temperatures of 86 °F (30 °C); wind speeds of 8.9 miles per hour (14.3 km/h)
- Average speed: 70.23 mph (113.02 km/h)
- Attendance: 6,500

Pole position
Driver	Bobby Isaac	Nord Krauskopf

Most laps led
Driver	Richard Petty	Petty Enterprises
- Laps: 131

Winner
No. 71	Bobby Isaac	Nord Krauskopf

Television in the United States
- Network: untelevised
- Announcers: none

The 1969 Sandlapper 200 was a NASCAR Grand National Series event that was held on September 18, 1969, at Columbia Speedway in Columbia, South Carolina.

The transition to purpose-built racecars began in the early 1960s and occurred gradually over that decade. Changes made to the sport by the late 1960s brought an end to the "strictly stock" vehicles of the 1950s.

== Background ==
Columbia Speedway was an oval racetrack located in Cayce, a suburb of Columbia, South Carolina. It was the site of auto races for NASCAR's top series from 1951 through 1971. For most of its history, the racing surface was dirt. The races in April and August 1970 were two of the final three Grand National Series races ever held on a dirt track.

The track was paved before hosting its last two Grand National races in 1971.

== Race report ==
Bobby Isaac defeated Richard Petty by half a lap in front of a live audience of 6,500 NASCAR followers. Notable crew chiefs that participated in the event were John Hill, Dick Hutcherson, Dale Inman and Harry Hyde.

The first-place position of the race changed hands three times and the race lasted one hour and twenty-five minutes. Only two caution flags were waved for 15 laps. While Petty would qualify for the pole position with a top speed of 73.108 miles per hour (117.656 km/h) in qualifying, the average speed of the race winner would be 70.23 miles per hour (113.02 km/h). The race was done on a dirt oval track and Isaac received $1,000 in prize winnings ($8,574 when adjusted for inflation). There were 23 American-born drivers on the starting grid.

Eldon Yarbrough, the brother of the late LeeRoy Yarbrough, would retire from NASCAR after this race with his only top ten finish in NASCAR history. Wayne Gillette would withdraw from the race for reasons unknown and would finish the race in last place. Johnny Halford would make his NASCAR debut here.

=== Qualifying ===
Grid	No.	Driver	Manufacturer	Owner
1	43	Richard Petty	'69 Ford	Petty Enterprises
2	71	Bobby Isaac	'69 Dodge	Nord Krauskopf
3	4	John Sears	'69 Ford	L.G. DeWitt
4	47	Cecil Gordon	'68 Ford	Bill Seifert
5	0	Frank Warren	'67 Chevrolet	Don Tarr
6	17	David Pearson	'69 Ford	Holman-Moody Racing
7	45	Bill Seifert	'68 Ford	Bill Seifert
8	8	Ed Negre	'67 Plymouth	G.C. Spencer
9	48	James Hylton	'69 Dodge	James Hylton
10	10	Bill Champion	'68 Ford	Bill Champion
11	70	J.D. McDuffie	'67 Buick	J.D. McDuffie
12	25	Jabe Thomas	'67 Plymouth	Don Robertson
13	64	Elmo Langley	'68 Ford	Elmo Langley
14	09	E.J. Trivette	'67 Chevrolet	E.C. Reid
15	04	Ken Meisenhelder	'67 Oldsmobile	Ken Meisenhelder
16	76	Ben Arnold	'68 Ford	Don Culpepper
17	34	Wendell Scott	'67 Ford	Wendell Scott
18	19	Henley Gray	'68 Ford	Harry Melton
19	08	Wayne Gillette	'69 Chevrolet	E.C. Reid
20	06	Neil Castles	'67 Plymouth	Neil Castles

== Top 10 finishers ==
Pos	Grid	No.	Driver	Manufacturer	Laps	Winnings	Laps led	Time/Status
1	2	71	Bobby Isaac	Dodge	200	$1,000	69	1:25:26
2	1	43	Richard Petty	Ford	200	$600	131	+0.5 laps
3	9	48	James Hylton	Dodge	196	$400	0	+4 laps
4	3	4	John Sears	Ford	195	$350	0	+5 laps
5	23	56	Eldon Yarbrough	Ford	194	$325	0	+6 laps
6	13	64	Elmo Langley	Ford	190	$300	0	+10 laps
7	11	70	J.D. McDuffie	Buick	189	$275	0	+11 laps
8	17	34	Wendell Scott	Ford	187	$270	0	+13 laps
9	4	47	Cecil Gordon	Ford	187	$265	0	+13 laps
10	7	45	Bill Seifert	Ford	186	$260	0	+14 laps

== Timeline ==
Section reference:

- Start of race: Richard Petty started the race with the pole position but was quickly overtaken by Bobby Isaac.
- Lap 3: Wayne Gillette quits the race for personal reasons.
- Lap 4: Richard Petty retook the lead from Bobby Isaac.
- Lap 13: Ed Negre's transmission developed problems, forcing him out of the race.
- Lap 34: Paul Dean Holt's engine stopped working properly, ending his race weekend prematurely.
- Lap 45: The axle on Neil Castles' vehicle became problematic, ending his day on the track.
- Lap 82: David Pearson had a terminal crash, forcing him to withdraw from the event.
- Lap 108: Frank Warren's vehicle developed suspension problems, causing him to exit the race.
- Lap 135: Bobby Isaac took over the lead from Richard Petty.
- Finish: Bobby Isaac was officially declared the winner of the event.

Preceded by 1969 Talladega 500	NASCAR Grand National races 1969	Succeeded by 1969 Old Dominion 500
