= 1970 Home State 200 =

Auto race held at North Carolina State Fairgrounds in 1970

Race details
- Race 42 of 48 in the 1970 NASCAR Grand National Series season
- Date: September 30, 1970; 54 years ago
- Official name: Home State 200
- Location: North Carolina State Fairgrounds, Raleigh, North Carolina
- Course: Permanent racing facility
- Course length: 0.804 km (0.500 miles)
- Distance: 200 laps, 100.0 mi (160.9 km)
- Weather: Mild with temperatures of 73.9 °F (23.3 °C); wind speeds of 17.1 miles per hour (27.5 km/h)
- Average speed: 68.376 miles per hour (110.041 km/h)
- Attendance: 6,000

Pole position
Driver	John Sears	John Sears

Most laps led
Driver	Richard Petty	Don Robertson
- Laps: 112

Winner
No. 43	Richard Petty	Don Robertson

Television in the United States
- Network: untelevised
- Announcers: none

The 1970 Home State 200 was a NASCAR Grand National Series event that was held on September 30, 1970, at North Carolina State Fairgrounds in Raleigh, North Carolina.

The race car drivers still had to commute to the races using the same stock cars that competed in a typical weekend's race through a policy of homologation (and under their own power). This policy was in effect until roughly 1975. By 1980, NASCAR had completely stopped tracking the year model of all the vehicles and most teams did not take stock cars to the track under their own power anymore.

== Summary ==
This race was done on a dirt track spanning a distance of 0.500 miles (0.805 km); for a grand total distance of 100.0 miles (160.9 km). Benny Parsons was driving the car like a modern NASCAR driver would drive on asphalt while Richard Petty was swinging his car sideways and sliding around the corners. Parsons was carefully following Petty after losing the lead; thinking he could try to throw his car to a corner in an attempt to imitate Richard Petty. As soon as he came off of turn 4 and prepared to throw his car sideways into turn 1, the engine blew after 96 laps of consistent racing.

There were 23 drivers on the racing grid; all of them were American-born males. John Sears would finish in last-place as the result of an engine problem on lap 16 even though he was fastest qualifier and led the first ten laps. Richard Petty defeated Neil Castles by more than two laps in front of 6,000 live audience members. Neil Castles would receive his final 2nd-place finish in Grand National career. His name often comes up in the "best driver never to get a win" discussions. Two lead changes were made in addition to one yellow flag being waved for four laps; making the race last one hour and twenty-seven minutes. The other finishers in the top ten included: Bobby Isaac, James Hylton, Cecil Gordon, Bobby Allison, Dave Marcis, Ben Arnold, Bill Hollar, Jabe Thomas. Nord Krauskopf, James Hylton, and Bobby Allison were the most notable NASCAR owners in this race.

This race was the final dirt track race in what is now known as the Cup Series until the 2021 Food City Dirt Race. John Kenney would retire after this race while Bill Hollar would make his debut here. The top prize of the race was $1,000 ($8,096.83 when considering inflation) while the last-place finisher received $200 ($1,619.37 when considering inflation).

=== Qualifying ===
Grid	No.	Driver	Manufacturer
1	4	John Sears	'69 Dodge
2	72	Benny Parsons	'69 Ford
3	71	Bobby Isaac	'69 Dodge
4	64	Elmo Langley	'69 Ford
5	06	Neil Castles	'69 Dodge
6	43	Richard Petty	'69 Plymouth
7	22	Bobby Allison	'70 Dodge
8	48	James Hylton	'70 Ford
9	26	Dave Marcis	'69 Ford
10	8	Ed Negre	'69 Ford

== Timeline ==
Section reference:

- Start of race: John Sears starts off the race in the pole position.
- Lap 11: Benny Parsons takes over the lead from John Sears.
- Lap 16: John Sears fell out with engine failure while he was racing at competitive speeds.
- Lap 29: The water hose came loose on Lee Roy Carrigg's vehicle.
- Lap 61: Ignition problems forced Frank Warren to bail out of the race prematurely.
- Lap 68: Transmission issues would force Wendell Scott to exit the race.
- Lap 77: Driveshaft issues would prevent J.D. McDuffie from winning the race.
- Lap 86: Elmo Langley managed to overheat his vehicle from the excess speeds of stock car racing.
- Lap 87: Bill Champion fell out with engine failure.
- Lap 89: Richard Petty takes over the lead from Benny Parsons.
- Lap 94: Ed Negre would cause his vehicle to overheat itself.
- Lap 96: Benny Parsons fell out with engine failure.
- Lap 97: Bill Seifert could no longer steer his vehicle in a safe manner, making him the final DNF of the race.
- Finish: Richard Petty was officially declared the winner of the event.

Preceded by 1970 Mason-Dixon 300	NASCAR Grand National Season; 1970	Succeeded by 1970 Wilkes 400

Preceded by 1970 Mason-Dixon 300	Richard Petty's Career Wins; 1960-1984	Succeeded by 1970 Old Dominion 500
