= Buddy Baker =

American racing driver (1941–2015)

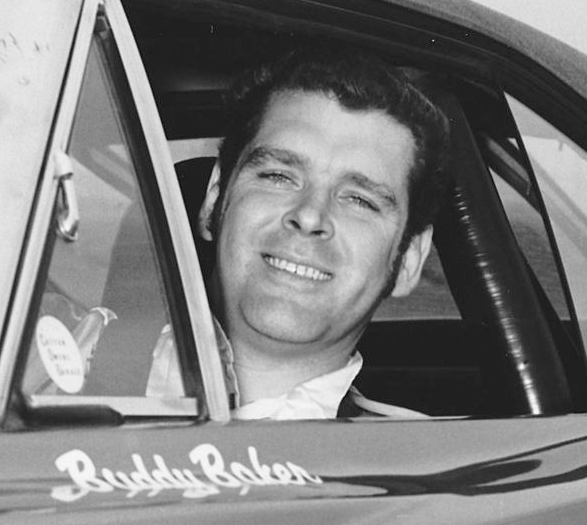
- Baker in his car, 1970
- Born: Elzie Wylie Baker Jr. January 25, 1941; Florence, South Carolina, U.S.
- Died: August 10, 2015 (aged 74); Lake Norman of Catawba, North Carolina, U.S.
- Cause of death: Lung Cancer
- Achievements: 1980 Daytona 500 Winner; 1970 Southern 500 Winner; 1968, 1972, 1973 World 600 Winner; 1975, 1976, 1980 Winston 500 Winner; 1979 Busch Clash Winner
- Awards: International Motorsports Hall of Fame (1995); Charlotte Motor Speedway Court of Legends (1995); National Motorsports Press Association Hall of Fame (1997); Named one of NASCAR's 50 Greatest Drivers (1998); NASCAR Hall of Fame (2020); Named one of NASCAR's 75 Greatest Drivers (2023)

NASCAR Cup Series career
- 700 races run over 33 years
- Best finish: 5th (1977)
- First race: 1959 untitled race (Columbia)
- Last race: 1992 Winston 500 (Talladega)
- First win: 1967 National 500 (Charlotte)
- Last win: 1983 Firecracker 400 (Daytona)
Wins	Top tens	Poles
19	311	38

NASCAR Grand National East Series career
- 8 races run over 2 years
- Best finish: 15th (1973)
- First race: 1972 Sandlapper 200 (Columbia)
- Last race: 1973 Buddy Shuman 100 (Hickory)
- First win: 1972 Sandlapper 200 (Columbia)
- Last win: 1973 Sunoco 260 (Hickory)
Wins	Top tens	Poles
4	7	2
- Statistics up to date as of December 18, 2012.

Elzie Wylie "Buddy" Baker Jr. (January 25, 1941 – August 10, 2015) was an American professional stock car racing driver and commentator. Over the course of his 33-year racing career, he won 19 races in the NASCAR Cup Series, including the 1980 Daytona 500. Known by the nickname "Gentle Giant", Baker was noted for his prowess at NASCAR's superspeedways, Daytona and Talladega, at which he won a combined six races. After his racing career, he worked as a broadcaster and co-hosted a number of radio shows on SiriusXM.

== Early life ==
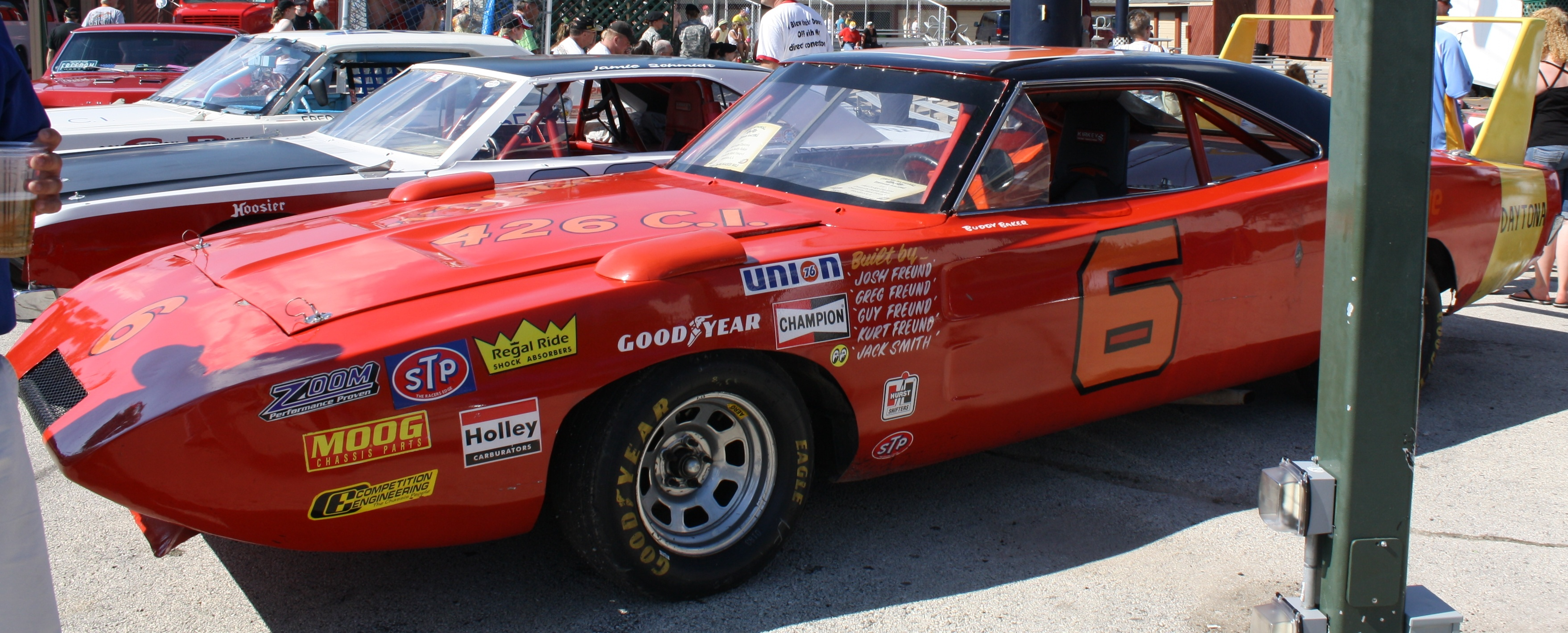
Replica of Baker's 1969 Dodge Charger Daytona

Baker was born on January 25, 1941, in Florence, South Carolina, the son of two-time NASCAR champion Buck Baker. A high school athlete, Baker began racing in 1958 at the age of seventeen, and started his NASCAR career the following year. As a teenager, he idolized many of NASCAR's top drivers, including his father and Fireball Roberts, and he studied them closely during his early NASCAR career.

== Career ==
Baker won his first race in 1967, winning the National 500 at Charlotte Motor Speedway. On March 24, 1970, he became the first driver ever to exceed 200 mph (320 km/h) on a closed course, accomplishing the feat while testing the Chrysler Engineering No. 88 blue 1969 Dodge Daytona, also known as DC-93. That car was the only one to exceed 200 in 1970. He became known for his skill at superspeedways; in his career, he won four races at Talladega and two at Daytona, including the 1980 Daytona 500. Baker's victory in that race remains the fastest Daytona 500 in NASCAR history, posting an average speed of 177.602 mph (285.809 km/h).

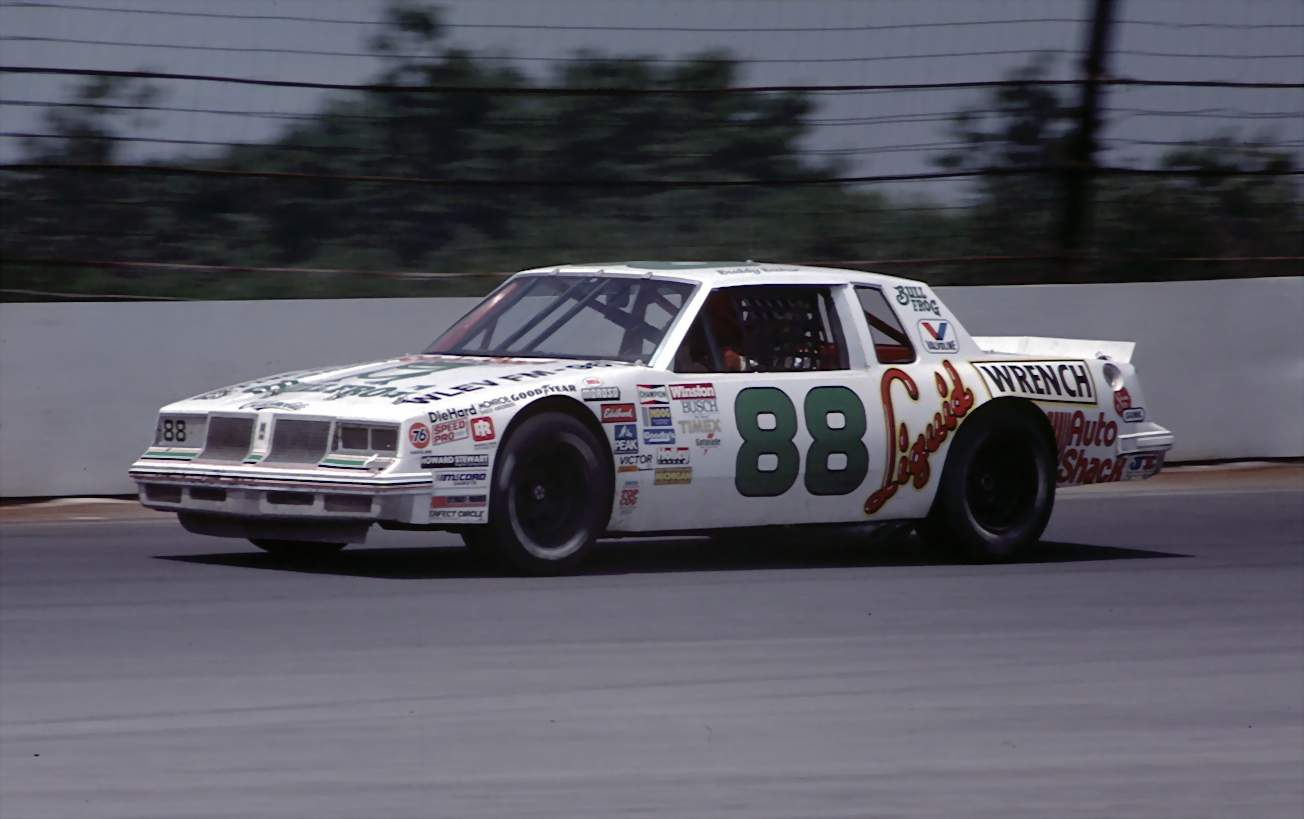
Baker driving at Pocono Raceway in 1985

He is one of nine drivers to have accomplished a Career Grand Slam, a feat which involves winning NASCAR's four most prestigious races: the Daytona 500, Jack Link's 500, Coca-Cola 600, and Southern 500. The only other drivers to have accomplished this feat are Richard Petty, David Pearson, Bobby Allison, Darrell Waltrip, Dale Earnhardt, Jeff Gordon, Jimmie Johnson, Kevin Harvick, and Denny Hamlin. Of the ten, Baker is one of two to have never won a Cup Series championship. He generally raced part-time, having only raced three full seasons, and co-owned his car from 1985 to 1989. He competed in two International Race of Champions series, IROC IV and IROC VII, and helped run the Buck Baker Racing School with his brother for a number of years.

Baker retired from NASCAR in 1994, finishing with nineteen career victories. His 1,099 laps led at Talladega Superspeedway remain the track's all-time career record.

== Broadcasting career and later life ==
After his retirement, Baker became a television broadcaster, acting as an analyst initially for The Nashville Network beginning in 1991, and later for TBS and CBS beginning in 1996. As a commentator, he helped call some of the most legendary moments in NASCAR history, including the first Winston All-Star Race held at night, the last 500-mile race at Dover in 1997, Dale Earnhardt's only Daytona 500 win, and the first race at Daytona to be held under the lights in Prime Time.

In 2001, Baker began calling American Speed Association races with Bob Dillner on The Nashville Network. He continued until the end of the 2002 season.

In 2007, Baker became the part-time co-host of "The Driver's Seat" with John Kernan on SiriusXM's new NASCAR Radio channel. He later became a regular on "Tradin' Paint" with Steve Post and co-host on "Late Shift" with Alex Hayden.

On July 7, 2015, Baker announced his retirement from broadcasting, and revealed that he had been diagnosed with lung cancer. During his final broadcast, he told his audience, "Do not shed a tear. Give a smile when you say my name".

Baker died on August 10, 2015, at his home in Catawba County, North Carolina. During the August 2015 race weekend at Michigan International Speedway, the drivers in all three NASCAR series placed stickers on their cars to honor Baker's legacy.

== Awards ==
In 1997, Baker was inducted into the International Motorsports Hall of Fame in Talladega, Alabama, and the National Motorsports Press Association Hall of Fame. He was named one of NASCAR's 50 Greatest Drivers in 1998.

Baker was inducted into the Motorsports Hall of Fame of America in 2008, and the NASCAR Hall of Fame in January 2020.

== Motorsports career results ==
=== NASCAR ===
(key) (Bold – Pole position awarded by qualifying time. Italics – Pole position earned by points standings or practice time. * – Most laps led.)

==== Grand National Series ====
NASCAR Grand National Series results
Year	Team	No.	Make	1	2	3	4	5	6	7	8	9	10	11	12	13	14	15	16	17	18	19	20	21	22	23	24	25	26	27	28	29	30	31	32	33	34	35	36	37	38	39	40	41	42	43	44	45	46	47	48	49	50	51	52	53	54	55	56	57	58	59	60	61	62	NGNC	Pts	Ref
1959	Buck Baker Racing	89	Chevy	FAY	DAY	DAY	HBO	CON	ATL	WIL	BGS	CLB; 14	NWS	REF	HCY	MAR	TRN	CLT	NSV	ASP	PIF	GPS; 17	ATL	CLB; 7	WIL; 7	RCH; 19	BGS	AWS; 7	DAY	HEI																																				26th	1692	
1959	Lynton Tyson	88	Chevy																												CLT; 8																CON; 4																			26th	1692	
1959	Lynton Tyson	89	Chevy																													MBS; 11	CLT; 21	NSV; 30	AWS	BGS	GPS	CLB																												26th	1692	
1959	Julian Buesink	95	Ford																																				DAR; 40	HCY	RCH	CSF	HBO	MAR	AWS	NWS																				26th	1692	
1960	Lynton Tyson	88	Chevy	CLT; 27	CLB	DAY	DAY	DAY	CLT																																																									38th	3070	
1960	Jess Potter	1	Chevy							NWS; 9	PHO	CLB; 17	MAR; 23	HCY; 17	WIL; 14	BGS	GPS	AWS	DAR; 17																																															38th	3070	
1960	Jess Potter	32	Chevy																	PIF; 20	HBO	RCH	HMS																																											38th	3070	
1960	Spook Crawford	20	Ford																					CLT; 19	BGS	DAY	HEI	MAB; 12	MBS	ATL; DNQ	BIR	NSV																																		38th	3070	
1960	Spook Crawford	64	Ford																														AWS; 28	PIF; 15	CLB	SBO	BGS																													38th	3070	
1960	Buck Baker Racing	87	Chevy																																			DAR; 34	HCY	CSF	GSP	HBO	MAR																							38th	3070	
1960	Fred Harb	7	Ford																																									NWS; 13	CLT	RCH; 19	ATL																			38th	3070	
1961	Fred Harb	7	Ford	CLT; 17	JSP	DAY																																																												39th	3668	
1961	Buck Baker Racing	86	Chrysler				DAY; 14	DAY; 40	PIF	AWS	HMS											DAR; 25	CLT	CLT; 15	RSD	ASP	CLT; 26	PIF	BIR	GPS	BGS	NOR	HAS	STR	DAY; 27	ATL; 8	CLB	MBS							DAR; 24	HCY	RCH	CSF	ATL	MAR	NWS	CLT	BRI	GPS	HBO											39th	3668	
1961	Buck Baker Racing	87	Chrysler									ATL; DNQ	GPS	HBO	BGS	MAR; 14	NWS; 7	CLB	HCY	RCH	MAR																		BRI; 5	NSV; 22	BGS	AWS; 16	RCH	SBO																						39th	3668	
1962	Buck Baker Racing	86	Chrysler	CON	AWS	DAY; 8	DAY	DAY; 29						CLB; 13	NWS	GPS	MBS	MAR	BGS	BRI; 12	RCH	HCY	CON	DAR; 11	PIF	CLT; 35	ATL; 11	BGS	AUG; 6	RCH; 25	SBO; 15	DAY; 18		ASH; 18	GPS; 9	AUG; 4	SVH; 16	MBS; 4	BRI; 15	CHT; 11	NSV; 21	HUN; 8	AWS; 24	STR	BGS	PIF	VAL	DAR; 37	HCY	RCH	DTS	AUG	MAR; 13	NWS; 23	CLT; 33											23rd	9828	
1962	Buck Baker Racing	87	Chrysler						CON; 5	AWS; 3	SVH; 9	HBO; 5	RCH																				CLB; 14																							ATL; 15										23rd	9828	
1963	J.C. Parker	49	Dodge	BIR	GGS	THS	RSD	DAY	DAY	DAY	PIF	AWS	HBO	ATL; 39	HCY; 12	BRI	AUG	RCH	GPS	SBO	BGS	MAR																																												52nd	2102	
1963	Buck Baker Racing	7	Chrysler																				NWS; 13	CLB; 4	THS	DAR	ODS	RCH																																						52nd	2102	
1963	Cliff Stewart	2	Pontiac																										CLT; 38	BIR	ATL; 29	DAY	MBS	SVH	DTS	BGS	ASH	OBS	BRR	BRI	GPS	NSV	CLB	AWS; 10	PIF	BGS	ONA																			52nd	2102	
1963	Buck Baker Racing	87	Pontiac																																													DAR; 23	HCY	RCH	MAR	DTS	NWS	THS	CLT	SBO	HBO	RSD								52nd	2102	
1964	Buck Baker Racing	87	Pontiac	CON	AUG; 10	JSP																																																												31st	7314	
1964		30	Chevy				SVH; 19	RSD	DAY	DAY																																																								31st	7314	
1964	David Walker	89	Plymouth								DAY; 29	RCH																																																						31st	7314	
1964	Jack Anderson	20	Ford										BRI; 29	GPS	BGS	ATL	AWS																																																	31st	7314	
1964	Ray Osborne	92	Ford															HBO; 23																																																31st	7314	
1964	J.C. Parker	87	Dodge																PIF; 8	CLB; 21	NWS; 17	MAR; 22	SVH; 4	DAR; 29	LGY; 3	HCY; 5	SBO; 18	CLT; 36	GPS; 15	ASH; 17	ATL	CON; 9	NSV; 15	CHT; 15	BIR; 19	VAL; 11	PIF; 12	DAY																												31st	7314	
1964	Curtis Crider	01	Mercury																																				ODS; 15		BRR; 20																									31st	7314	
1964	Fox Racing	03	Dodge																																					OBS; 21																										31st	7314	
1964	Fox Racing	3	Dodge																																							ISP; 20	GLN	LIN	BRI	NSV	MBS	AWS	DTS	ONA	CLB	BGS	STR													31st	7314	
1964	Bernard Alvarez	10	Ford																																																			DAR; 31	HCY	RCH	ODS	HBO	MAR; 37	SVH	NWS; 22	CLT; 28	HAR	AUG; 9	JAC; 22	31st	7314	
1965	Buck Baker Racing	86	Plymouth	RSD	DAY	DAY; 14			AWS; 21	RCH	HBO																					DAY; 2																							CLT; 23		CAR; 24									9th	20672	
1965	Buck Baker Racing	88	Dodge				DAY; 40	PIF				ATL; 5		NWS; 20	MAR; 35	CLB; 14	BRI; 33	DAR; 6	LGY	BGS		CLT; 4	CCF; 15	ASH	HAR; 17	NSV	BIR	ATL; 5	GPS	MBS; 22	VAL; 17		ODS; 22	OBS; 8		GLN; 3	BRI; 30	NSV; 19	CCF	AWS; 4	SMR; 2	PIF		CLB; 15	DTS; 6				HCY; 12				MAR; 11	NWS; 10		HBO; 11										9th	20672	
1965	Buck Baker Racing	86	Dodge										GPS; 3																																					LIN; 5	ODS; 3	RCH; 16														9th	20672	
1965	Buck Baker Racing	87	Olds																		HCY; 5																																													9th	20672	
1965	Langley Racing	64	Ford																																ISP; 17												BGS; 18																			9th	20672	
1965		95	Pontiac																																								AUG; 7																							9th	20672	
1965	Gene Hobby	99	Dodge																																											BLV; 18																				9th	20672	
1965	Buck Baker Racing	87	Chevy																																													DAR; 28										DTS; 3								9th	20672	
1966	Buck Baker Racing	88	Dodge	AUG; 15	RSD																																																													22nd	14302	
1966	Buck Baker Racing	88	Chevy			DAY; 19	DAY	DAY; 32	CAR; 13	BRI		HCY; 17	CLB; 20	GPS; 24	BGS		MAR; 10	DAR; 21	LGY																																															22nd	14302	
1966	Buck Baker Racing	87	Olds								ATL; 43																																																							22nd	14302	
1966	Gene Black	74	Ford													NWS; 14																																																		22nd	14302	
1966	Handy Racing	25	Ford																	MGR; 12																																														22nd	14302	
1966	Joan Petre	73	Ford																		MON; 24	RCH		DTS; 20	ASH; 20	PIF; 20	SMR; 9	AWS; 23	BLV; 12	GPS; 14		ODS; 20	BRR; 22								CLB; 8	AWS; 28	BLV; 6			HCY; 17	RCH	HBO; 17	MAR; 20	NWS; 10																22nd	14302	
1966	Fox Racing	3	Dodge																				CLT; 37								DAY; 11									ATL; 2					DAR; 33						CLT; 35	CAR; 6														22nd	14302	
1966	Emory Gilliam	00	Dodge																															OXF; 23	FON; 19	ISP; 29	BRI; 31	**SMR**; 22	NSV																											22nd	14302	
1966	Emory Gilliam	00	Ford																																									BGS; 16																						22nd	14302	
1967	Fox Racing	3	Dodge	AUG	RSD	DAY; 4	DAY	DAY; 28	AWS	BRI			ATL; 3	CLB	HCY	NWS	MAR	SVH	RCH	DAR; 24	BLV	LGY	CLT; 7	ASH				CAR; 2	GPS	MGY	DAY; 28	TRN							ATL; 23				DAR; 30	HCY	RCH	BLV				CLT; 1*	CAR; 19	AWS														15th	18600	
1967	Toy Bolton	47	Chevy								GPS; 4	BGS																																																						15th	18600	
1967	Buck Baker Racing	87	Ford																						MGR; 18	SMR	BIR						OXF; 14	FDA	ISP																															15th	18600	
1967	Ranier Racing	68	Ford																																	BRI; 11	SMR	NSV																												15th	18600	
1967	Buck Baker Racing	88	Chevy																																					BGS; 11																										15th	18600	
1967	Owens Racing	6	Dodge																																						CLB; 17						HBO; 3	MAR; 21	NWS; 24																	15th	18600	
1967	Buck Baker Racing	88	Olds																																							SVH; 17																								15th	18600	
1968	Owens Racing	6	Dodge	MGR	MGY	RSD; 25																																																												13th	2310	
1968	Fox Racing	3	Dodge				DAY; 30	BRI; 23	RCH	ATL; 7	HCY	GPS; 17	CLB; 4	NWS; 2	MAR; 31	AUG; 2	AWS; 18	DAR; 4	BLV; 3	LGY; 3	CLT; 1*	ASH; 2	MGR; 26	SMR; 19	BIR	CAR; 38	GPS; 30	DAY; 32	**ISP**; 3	**OXF**; 3	FDA; 2	TRN; 20	BRI; 6	SMR; 4	NSV	**ATL**; 36	**CLB**; 16	BGS	AWS	SBO; 5	LGY; 17	DAR; 3	HCY; 3	RCH; 5	BLV	HBO; 21	MAR; 22	NWS; 17	AUG	CLT; 43	CAR; 25	JFC														13th	2310	
1969	Fox Racing	3	Dodge	MGR	MGY	RSD	**DAY**; 27	DAY	**DAY**; 5	CAR; 38	AUG	BRI; 29	ATL; 36	CLB	HCY	GPS	RCH	NWS; 4	MAR	AWS																																														22nd	1769	
1969	Owens Racing	6	Dodge																		DAR; 31	BLV	LGY	CLT; 16	MGR	SMR	MCH	KPT	GPS	NCF	DAY; 2	DOV	TPN	TRN	BLV	BRI; 27	NSV	SMR	ATL; 8	MCH; 2	SBO	BGS	AWS	DAR; 3	HCY	RCH	TAL; Wth	CLB	MAR; 3*	NWS; 5	CLT; 3	SVH	AUG	CAR; 3	JFC	MGR	**TWS**; 8*									22nd	1769	
1970	Owens Racing	6	Dodge	RSD	DAY	**DAY**; 2	DAY; 27	RCH	CAR; 33	SVH	ATL; 20	BRI	TAL; 12*	NWS	CLB	DAR; 15	BLV	LGY	CLT; 23	SMR	MAR	MCH; 7	RSD	HCY	KPT	GPS	DAY; 2*	AST	TPN	TRN; 34	BRI	SMR	NSV	ATL; 4	CLB		MCH; 6	TAL; 5	BGS	SBO	DAR; 1	HCY	RCH	DOV; 11	NCF	NWS	CLT; 26	MAR	MGR	CAR; 5	LGY															24th	1555	
1970	Neil Castles	86	Dodge																																	ONA; 21																														24th	1555	
1971	Petty Enterprises	11	Dodge	RSD	DAY	DAY; 2*	DAY; 2	ONT; 2	RCH	CAR; 3	HCY	BRI	ATL; 6	CLB	GPS	SMR	NWS	MAR	DAR; 1	SBO	TAL; 3	ASH	KPT	CLT; 6	DOV; 22	MCH; 5	RSD	HOU	GPS	DAY; 3	BRI	AST	ISP			**ATL**; 25	BGS	ONA	MCH; 3	TAL; 36	CLB	HCY	DAR; 3	MAR	CLT; 6	DOV	CAR; 2*	MGR	RCH	NWS	TWS; 2															15th	2358	
1971	Neil Castles	06	Dodge																															TRN; 2	NSV																															15th	2358	

==== Winston Cup Series ====
NASCAR Winston Cup Series results
Year	Team	No.	Make	1	2	3	4	5	6	7	8	9	10	11	12	13	14	15	16	17	18	19	20	21	22	23	24	25	26	27	28	29	30	31	NWCC	Pts	Ref
1972	Petty Enterprises	11	Dodge	RSD	DAY; 34	RCH	ONT; 3	CAR; 34	ATL; 8	BRI	DAR; 20	NWS	MAR	TAL; 3	CLT; 1	DOV	MCH	RSD	TWS	DAY; 24	BRI	TRN	ATL	TAL; 22	MCH	NSV	DAR; 29								24th	3936.7	
1972	K&K Insurance Racing	71	Dodge																									RCH; 17	DOV; 11	MAR; 4	**NWS**; 3	CLT; 2	CAR; 3	TWS; 1*	24th	3936.7	
1973	K&K Insurance Racing	71	Dodge	RSD; 35	**DAY**; 6*	RCH; 2	CAR; 3	BRI; 25	ATL; 4	NWS; 3	DAR; 8	MAR; 4	**TAL**; 40	NSV; 3	**CLT**; 1*	DOV; 7	**TWS**; 6*	RSD; 38	**MCH**; 2*	DAY; 3	BRI	ATL; 34	TAL; 2	NSV; 1	DAR; 3	RCH; 17	DOV; 3	NWS; 4	MAR; 4	CLT; 41	CAR; 2				6th	6327.6	
1974	K&K Insurance Racing	71	Dodge	RSD	DAY	RCH	CAR	BRI	ATL; 3	DAR; 3	NWS	MAR	TAL; 33	NSV	DOV																				7th	1016.88	
1974	Bud Moore Engineering	15	Ford													CLT; 22	RSD	MCH; 30	DAY; 3	BRI; 2	NSV; 25	ATL; 3	**POC**; 2	TAL; 6*	MCH; 4	DAR; 33	RCH	**DOV**; 2	NWS; 3	MAR; 2	CLT; 37	CAR; 34	ONT; 5		7th	1016.88	
1975	Bud Moore Engineering	15	Ford	RSD	DAY; 20	RCH	**CAR**; 25	**BRI**; 3	ATL; 2	NWS; 3	DAR; 19	MAR; 19	**TAL**; 1*	NSV	DOV; 11	CLT; 5	RSD	MCH	DAY; 2*	NSV	POC; 3	TAL; 1*	MCH; 6	DAR; 28	DOV; 33	NWS; 4	MAR; 18	CLT; 3	RCH	CAR; 28	BRI; 24	ATL; 1*	ONT; 1*		15th	3050	
1976	Bud Moore Engineering	15	Ford	RSD; 28	DAY; 33	CAR; 4	RCH; 29	**BRI**; 21	ATL; 25	NWS; 26	DAR; 2*	MAR; 27	TAL; 1*	NSV; 4	DOV; 5	CLT; 28	RSD; 5	MCH; 5	DAY; 35	NSV; 23*	POC; 2	TAL; 2*	MCH; 31	BRI; 5	DAR; 31	RCH; 5	DOV; 5	MAR; 3	NWS; 4	CLT; 4*	CAR; 28	**ATL**; 5	ONT; 39		7th	3745	
1977	Bud Moore Engineering	15	Ford	RSD; 12	DAY; 3	RCH; 9	CAR; 4	ATL; 5	NWS; 4	DAR; 7	BRI; 29	MAR; 24	TAL; 33	NSV; 6	DOV; 9	CLT; 5	RSD; 5	MCH; 6	DAY; 7	NSV; 6	POC; 27	TAL; 6	MCH; 30	BRI; 15	DAR; 3	RCH; 27	DOV; 6	MAR; 21	NWS; 9	CLT; 4	CAR; 29	ATL; 7	ONT; 4		5th	3961	
1978	M.C. Anderson Racing	27	Olds	RSD	DAY; 7*	RCH		ATL; 27	BRI				TAL; 2						DAY; 37	NSV		TAL; 28	MCH; 36	BRI											24th	2130	
1978	M.C. Anderson Racing	27	Chevy				CAR; 33			DAR; 6	NWS	MAR		**DOV**; 23	CLT; 7	NSV	RSD	MCH; 8			POC; 5				DAR; 32	RCH	DOV; 3	MAR; 26	NWS	CLT; 34	CAR; 22	ATL; 21*	ONT; 4		24th	2130	
1979	Ranier-Lundy Racing	28	Chevy	RSD; 7		CAR; 31	RCH; 29		NWS; 8	**BRI**; 25	DAR; 5	MAR; 2		NSV; 8	DOV; 3	CLT; 36	**TWS**; 3	RSD	MCH; 1*			POC; 3		MCH; 2*	BRI	DAR; 4	RCH	DOV; 4	MAR; 1*	CLT; 25	NWS	**CAR**; 33	**ATL**; 39	ONT; 4	15th	3249	
1979	Ranier-Lundy Racing	28	Olds		**DAY**; 40			**ATL**; 1					TAL; 32							**DAY**; 34	NSV		TAL; 39												15th	3249	
1980	Ranier-Lundy Racing	28	Olds	RSD	**DAY**; 1*	RCH		**ATL**; 7	BRI				TAL; 1*	NSV						DAY; 4	NSV		**TAL**; 32*												21st	2603	
1980	Ranier-Lundy Racing	28	Chevy				CAR; 15			DAR; 35	NWS	MAR; 24			DOV; 3				MCH; 3					**MCH**; 6	BRI	DAR; 26	RCH	DOV; 3	NWS	**MAR**; 2		CAR; 27			21st	2603	
1980	Ranier-Lundy Racing	28	Buick													CLT; 39	TWS	RSD				POC; 2									**CLT**; 3		ATL; 4	ONT	21st	2603	
1981	Ellington Racing	1	Olds	RSD	DAY; 4	RCH	CAR; 5	ATL; 40	BRI	NWS						CLT; 33	TWS	RSD		DAY; 4	NSV														27th	1904	
1981	Ellington Racing	1	Buick								DAR; 6	MAR	TAL; 2*	NSV	DOV				MCH; 13			POC; 7	TAL; 32	MCH; 5	BRI	DAR; 5	RCH	DOV			CLT; 37	CAR; 16	ATL; 9	RSD	27th	1904	
1981	Kennie Childers Racing	12	Buick																										MAR; 29	NWS					27th	1904	
1982	Ellington Racing	1	Buick	DAY; 8	RCH	BRI	ATL; 30	CAR; 14	**DAR**; 37	NWS	MAR; 28	TAL; 25	NSV	DOV	CLT; 5	POC; 22	RSD																		23rd	2591	
1982	Ranier-Lundy Racing	28	Pontiac															MCH; 31	DAY; 8	NSV; 24	POC; 5	TAL; 2	MCH; 25	BRI; 9	DAR; 5	RCH; 9	DOV; 29	NWS; 24	CLT; 6	MAR; 6	CAR; 7	ATL; 21	RSD		23rd	2591	
1983	Wood Brothers Racing	21	Ford	DAY; 3	RCH; 10	CAR; 32	ATL; 3	DAR; 32	NWS	MAR; 31	TAL; 25	NSV	DOV; 5	BRI	**CLT**; 7	RSD	POC	MCH; 7	DAY; 1*	NSV	POC	TAL; 28	MCH; 10	BRI	DAR; 6	RCH; 7	DOV; 25	MAR; 22	NWS	CLT; 6	CAR; 29	ATL; 2	RSD; 20		21st	2621	
1984	Wood Brothers Racing	21	Ford	DAY; 38	RCH	CAR; 5	**ATL**; 23	BRI	NWS	DAR; 33	MAR; 10	TAL; 3	NSV	DOV; 7	CLT; 7	RSD	POC; 35	MCH; 10	DAY; 41	NSV	POC	TAL; 2*	MCH; 8	BRI	DAR; 3	RCH; 19	DOV; 26	MAR; 6	CLT; 29	NWS; 10	CAR; 7	ATL; 20	RSD		21st	2477	
1985	Baker-Schiff Racing	88	Olds	DAY; 4	RCH; 29	CAR; 25	ATL; 39	BRI; 4	DAR; 27	NWS; 30	MAR; 12	TAL; 6	DOV; 22	CLT; 37	RSD; 35	POC; 8	MCH; 15	DAY; 6	POC; 10	TAL; 14	MCH; 14	BRI; 11	DAR; 15	RCH; 16	DOV; 35	MAR; 31	NWS; 29	CLT; 8	CAR; 11	ATL; 13	RSD; 35				17th	2986	
1986	Baker-Schiff Racing	88	Olds	DAY; 26	RCH	CAR	ATL; 15	BRI	DAR; 30	NWS	MAR	TAL; 3	DOV	CLT; 17	RSD	POC; 36	MCH; 4	DAY; 14	POC; 36	TAL; 20	GLN	MCH; 41	BRI	DAR; 19	RCH	DOV; 4	MAR	NWS	CLT; 5	CAR; 5	ATL; 5	RSD; 29			24th	1924	
1987	Baker-Schiff Racing	88	Olds	DAY; 4	CAR; 31	RCH	ATL; 38	DAR; 25	NWS	BRI	MAR	TAL; 32	CLT; 7	DOV; 11	POC; 10	RSD	MCH; 16	DAY; 2	POC; 3	TAL; 10	GLN; 13	MCH; 8	BRI	DAR; 17	RCH	DOV; 8	MAR; 31	NWS	CLT; 41	CAR; 7	RSD	ATL; 10			24th	2373	
1988	Baker-Schiff Racing	88	Olds	DAY; 9	RCH; 15	CAR; 11	ATL; 7	DAR; 10	BRI; 31	NWS; 31	MAR; 7	TAL; 16	CLT; 29	DOV; 13	RSD; 19	POC; 7	MCH; 13	DAY; 6	POC; 23	TAL; 10	GLN	MCH	BRI	DAR	RCH	DOV	MAR	CLT	NWS	CAR	PHO	ATL			29th	2056	
1990	Donlavey Racing	90	Ford	DAY	RCH	CAR	ATL; 21	DAR; 40	BRI	NWS	MAR	TAL; 31	CLT; 15	DOV	SON	POC	MCH	DAY; 30	POC	TAL; 40	GLN	MCH; 23	BRI	DAR	RCH	DOV	MAR	NWS	CLT; 37	CAR	PHO	ATL			41st	498	
1991	Osterlund Racing	88	Pontiac	DAY; 37	RCH	CAR	ATL	DAR	BRI	NWS	MAR																								40th	552	
1991	Moroso Racing	88	Olds									TAL; 36	CLT	DOV	SON	POC																			40th	552	
1991	Moroso Racing	20	Olds														MCH; 30	DAY; 13	POC	TAL; 13	GLN	MCH; 13	BRI	DAR	RCH	DOV; DNQ	MAR	NWS	CLT; DNQ	CAR	PHO	ATL			40th	552	
1992	Close Racing	47	Olds	DAY; 11	CAR	RCH	ATL; 36	DAR; DNQ	BRI	NWS	MAR						MCH; DNQ	DAY	POC	TAL	GLN	MCH	BRI	DAR	RCH	DOV	MAR	NWS	CLT	CAR	PHO	ATL			48th	255	
1992	Close Racing	47	Chevy									TAL; 31	CLT	DOV	SON	POC																			48th	255	
1993	Hendrick Motorsports	46	Chevy	DAY	CAR	RCH	ATL	DAR	BRI	NWS	MAR	TAL	SON	CLT	DOV	POC	MCH	DAY	NHA	POC	TAL; DNQ	GLN	MCH	BRI	DAR	RCH	DOV	MAR	NWS	CLT	CAR	PHO	ATL		NA	-	
1994	Moroso Racing	20	Ford	DAY; DNQ	CAR	RCH	ATL; DNQ	DAR	BRI	NWS	MAR	TAL	SON	CLT	DOV	POC	MCH	DAY	NHA	POC	TAL	IND	GLN	MCH	BRI	DAR	RCH	DOV	MAR	NWS	CLT	CAR	PHO	ATL	NA	-	

===== Daytona 500 results =====
Year	Team	Manufacturer	Start	Finish
1961	Buck Baker Racing	Chrysler	28	40
1962	Buck Baker Racing	Chrysler	15	29
1964	David Walker	Plymouth	42	29
1965	Buck Baker Racing	Dodge	18	40
1966	Buck Baker Racing	Chevrolet	36	32
1967	Fox Racing	Dodge	9	28
1968	Fox Racing	Dodge	13	30
1969	Fox Racing	Dodge	**1**	5
1970	Owens Racing	Dodge	2	27
1971	Petty Enterprises	Dodge	6	2
1972	Petty Enterprises	Dodge	31	34
1973	K&K Insurance Racing	Dodge	**1**	6
1975	Bud Moore Engineering	Ford	13	20
1976	Bud Moore Engineering	Ford	5	33
1977	Bud Moore Engineering	Ford	8	3
1978	M.C. Anderson Racing	Oldsmobile	31	7
1979	Ranier-Lundy Racing	Oldsmobile	**1**	40
1980	Ranier-Lundy Racing	Oldsmobile	**1**	**1**
1981	Ellington Racing	Oldsmobile	6	4
1982	Ellington Racing	Buick	4	8
1983	Wood Brothers Racing	Ford	5	3
1984	Wood Brothers Racing	Ford	5	38
1985	Baker-Schiff Racing	Oldsmobile	7	4
1986	Baker-Schiff Racing	Oldsmobile	17	26
1987	Baker-Schiff Racing	Oldsmobile	7	4
1988	Baker-Schiff Racing	Oldsmobile	18	9
1991	Osterlund Racing	Pontiac	16	37
1992	Close Racing	Oldsmobile	24	11
1994	Moroso Racing	Ford	DNQ	

=== International Race of Champions ===
(key) (Bold – Pole position. * – Most laps led.)

International Race of Champions results
Year	Make	Q1	Q2	Q3	1	2	3	4	Pos.	Pts	Ref
1976–77	Chevy				MCH; 1	RSD; 6	RSD; 8	DAY; 8	5th	NA	
1979–80	Chevy	MCH; 4	MCH	RSD	RSD; 8	ATL; 9			10th	14	

Achievements
Preceded by Richard Petty	Daytona 500 Winner; 1980	Succeeded by Richard Petty
