= Bobby Allison =

American racing driver (1937–2024)

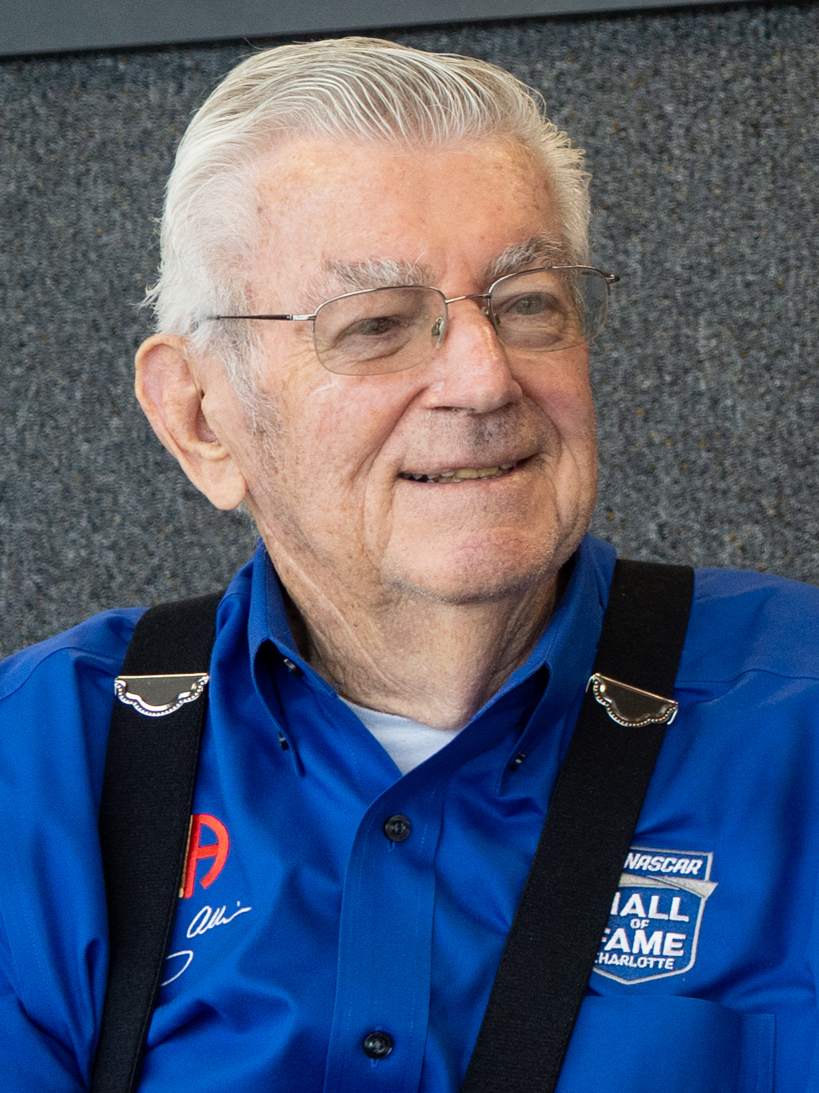
- Allison at Martinsville Speedway in 2022
- Born: Robert Arthur Allison; December 3, 1937; Miami, Florida, U.S.
- Died: November 9, 2024 (aged 86); Mooresville, North Carolina, U.S.
- Achievements: 1983 NASCAR Winston Cup Series Champion; 1964, 1965 NASCAR Modified National Championship Champion; 1980 IROC Champion; 1978, 1982, 1988 Daytona 500 Winner; 1971, 1972, 1975, 1983 Southern 500 Winner; 1971, 1981 1984 World 600 Winner; 1979, 1981, 1986 Winston 500 Winner; 1982 Busch Clash winner
- Awards: 1971–1973, 1980–1983 Winston Cup Series Most Popular Driver (7 times); 1960 NASCAR Modified National Championship Rookie of the Year; Motorsports Hall of Fame of America (1992); International Motorsports Hall of Fame (1993); Named one of NASCAR's 50 Greatest Drivers (1998); NASCAR Hall of Fame (2011); Named one of NASCAR's 75 Greatest Drivers (2023)

NASCAR Cup Series career
- 718 races run over 25 years
- Best finish: 1st (1983)
- First race: 1961 Daytona Twin 100 Qualifier #2 (Daytona)
- Last race: 1988 Miller High Life 500 (Pocono)
- First win: 1966 Maine 100 (Oxford)
- Last win: 1988 Daytona 500 (Daytona)
Wins	Top tens	Poles
85	447	59

NASCAR O'Reilly Auto Parts Series career
- 43 races run over 7 years
- Best finish: 27th (1984)
- First race: 1982 Sportsman 200 (Dover)
- Last race: 1988 Winn-Dixie 300 (Charlotte)
- First win: 1984 Mello Yello 300 (Charlotte)
- Last win: 1988 Goody's 300 (Daytona)
Wins	Top tens	Poles
2	22	0

NASCAR Grand National East Series career
- 17 races run over 2 years
- Best finish: 7th (1973)
- First race: 1972 Hickory 276 (Hickory)
- Last race: 1973 Buddy Shuman 100 (Hickory)
- First win: 1972 Hickory 276 (Hickory)
- Last win: 1973 Cumberland 200 (Fayetteville)
Wins	Top tens	Poles
6	11	7
- Statistics up to date as of December 22, 2012.

Robert Arthur Allison (December 3, 1937 – November 9, 2024) was an American professional stock car racing driver and owner. Allison was the founder of the Alabama Gang, a group of drivers based in Hueytown, Alabama, where there were abundant short tracks with high purses. Allison raced competitively in the NASCAR Cup Series from 1961 to 1988, while regularly competing in short track events throughout his career. He also raced in IndyCar, Trans-Am, and Can-Am. Named one of NASCAR's 50 greatest drivers and a member of the NASCAR Hall of Fame, he was the 1983 Winston Cup champion and won the Daytona 500 in 1978, 1982, and 1988.

His brother Donnie Allison was also a prominent driver, as were his two sons, Clifford and Davey Allison. Bobby and Donnie's televised fistfight with Cale Yarborough at the 1979 Daytona 500 has been credited with exposing NASCAR to a nationwide audience. Allison was unusual for competing successfully with his own, low-budget team for much of his career.

== Early life ==
Allison was born December 3, 1937, in Miami, Florida. He entered his first race as a senior at Archbishop Curley-Notre Dame High School in Miami. Since he was only seventeen, he had to have his parents' permission to compete. When his mother approved, Allison assumed it was permanent, but his mother believed it was for only one race. After he graduated from high school in 1955, Allison's mother thought she would derail his racing interest by sending him to Wisconsin to work for Mercury Outboard Motors, where her brother-in-law, Jimmy Hallett, was the national sales manager. Unbeknownst to her, the owner of Mercury was Carl Kiekhaefer, who also owned race cars. Allison began working as a mechanic and an engine tester. While employed at Mercury, Allison worked in the boat division for ten months, then was transferred to the racing division. During the two months he worked in the racing division for Kiekhaefer, he went to nineteen races, mostly Grand National (known as the NASCAR Cup Series as of 2020), and a few Convertible races. Every one of those races was won by a Carl Kiekhaefer car from the shop in which he worked. Kiekhaefer was a hard person to work for and several people got fired, so Allison decided to go back to Miami only after a little over two months.

In 1956, having returned to Miami, Allison started racing again. His parents had told Allison that he could not race and live at home, so Allison came up with a fictitious name (Bob Sunderman) which was used only once as he finished well enough to make the Sunday paper. Allison's father saw the paper and told him that if he was going to race he should do it with honor and use his own name. In 1959, Allison took his brother, Donnie, Kenny Andrews, who owned a car (whose father owned Andy Racing Wheels), and Gil Hearne, who went along as Kenny's driver, to find more lucrative racing than was available in South Florida. Their search led them to Montgomery Motor Speedway in Montgomery, Alabama, where he was informed of a race that would take place that night in Midfield, Alabama, near Birmingham. Allison entered and finished 5th in that race, which paid more than finishing second in any race of a higher level in South Florida. He went to Montgomery the next night, winning the preliminary races, and finished second in the feature, winning $400, having found his lucrative racing. The brothers returned home and Bobby convinced Red Farmer into coming back to Alabama with him. They had immediate success and began answering to the name The Alabama Gang. Allison became a well-known driver and a top star in short-track racing, earning back-to-back Modified Special titles in 1962–63, then two consecutive NASCAR National Modified championships in 1964–65.

== NASCAR career ==
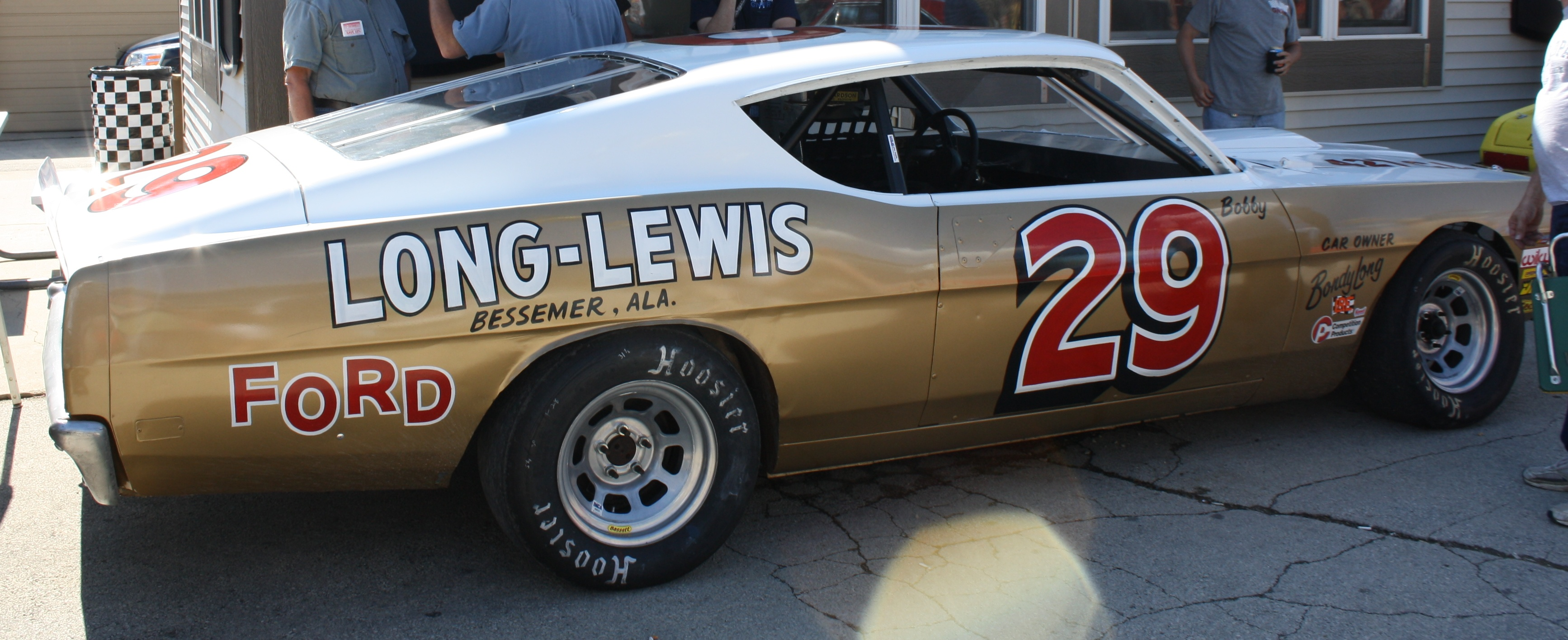
1968 racecar

Allison moved full-time to the Grand National circuit in 1965 and got his first victory at Oxford Plains Speedway on July 12, 1966.

During the course of his career, Bobby Allison accumulated 85 credited victories and one uncredited victory, making him fourth all-time. He also won the Daytona 500 in 1978, 1982 and 1988, finishing one-two with his son, Davey Allison. In 1972 he was voted national Driver of the Year after winning ten races and taking 11 poles, including a record five straight. He was NASCAR Winston Cup Champion in 1983, winning the Driver of the Year award again while driving for DiGard Racing. The 1982 Daytona 500 was fraught with controversy that became known as "Bumpergate". He also won the Firecracker 400 in 1982, making Allison the fourth driver to sweep both Cup point races at Daytona in the same year. After Allison accomplished this, no driver repeated such a feat until Jimmie Johnson did it in 2013.

Allison ran in the Indianapolis 500 twice, with a best finish of 25th in 1975. He also made two starts in the 1972 Trans-Am Series, driving a Brock Racing Enterprises (BRE) Datsun 510 in the Under 2.5 liter class; he finished third on debut at Laguna Seca. His NASCAR team owners included DiGard, Junior Johnson & Associates, and Roger Penske, for whom Allison scored four of the five NASCAR wins for American Motors' Matador. The other AMC victory was accomplished by Mark Donohue also racing for Penske in 1973 at Riverside. He raced in NASCAR as a driver/owner of an AMC Matador.

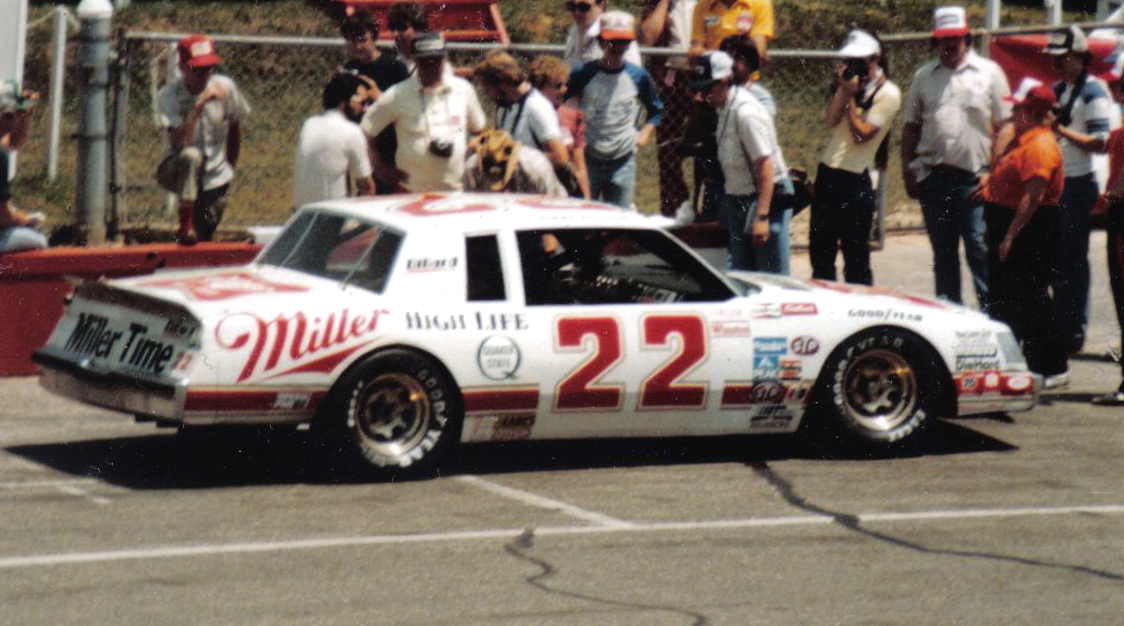
1983 championship car

Allison was involved in an accident at Talladega in May 1987, that saw his car cut down a tire, turn sideways and go airborne into the protective catch fence that separates the speedway from the grandstands. The impact, at over 200 miles per hour (320 km/h), tore out over one-hundred yards of fencing. Parts and pieces of the car went flying into the grandstand injuring several spectators. This was the same race where Bill Elliott had set the all-time qualifying record at 212 mph (341 km/h). NASCAR then mandated smaller carburetors for the remaining 1987 events at Talladega and Daytona. The following year, NASCAR mandated restrictor plates at Daytona and Talladega to keep speeds under 200 miles per hour (320 km/h).

Allison won the first Daytona 500 run with restrictor plates in February 1988 by a car length over his son Davey Allison, rendering him the first driver to have won the Daytona 500 both with and without restrictor plates. He is the oldest driver (50 years) ever to win the Daytona 500. Bobby and Davey Allison are the first one-two father/son finish in the Daytona 500. As a result of permanent injuries in a crash at Pocono (see below), Allison had no memory of the final win of his career or of celebrating together with his son in victory lane.

Allison competed in the first NASCAR race held outside North America, dominating the Goodyear NASCAR 500 at the Calder Park Thunderdome in Australia and ultimately losing by 0.86 seconds to Neil Bonnett.

Allison was elected to the International Motorsports Hall of Fame in 1993. He was elected to the NASCAR Hall of Fame in 2011.

=== Cale Yarborough fight ===
Early in the 1979 Daytona 500, Bobby, his brother Donnie and rival Cale Yarborough tangled early in the race. Donnie led the second half of the race while Yarborough made up his lost laps through caution periods. By the time there were eight laps to go, Yarborough reached second place and set his eyes on passing Donnie. Bobby was two laps down and was 1/4 mile ahead of the two rivals as Yarborough and Donnie crashed on the final lap. Richard Petty went by and won the race. Bobby passed the wreckage, finished the race, and on his way back around stopped to check on his brother and make sure he wasn't hurt. He pulled over to the wreck site to offer Donnie a ride to the garage area. Yarborough ran up to Bobby and, according to Bobby, Yarborough was yelling that Bobby was at fault and hit him in the face with his helmet—cutting his nose and his lip. Bobby climbed out and a fistfight broke out.

This fight led to a $6,000 fine each for Yarborough and the Allison brothers. In 2000 when asked about the fistfight Bobby said "I stopped to offer Donnie a ride to the garages and Cale comes running up saying I caused the wreck. I tried to tell him he had the wrong person. And I've said before, I think I questioned his ancestry. He hit me in the face with his helmet and I saw blood dripping onto my shirt. I thought 'If I don't stop this I'll be running from Cale for the rest of my life.' I climbed out and throttled him. He ran his nose into my fist several times. My story and I'm sticking to it forever. He never challenged me again. The fine surprised me, but the fact that it brought NASCAR onto the map makes it all worth every penny." Up until his death, Allison maintained that Yarborough was "beating his face on my fist".

Donnie had a similar story to Bobby: "Cale said I forced him in the mud. I did not. He wrecked himself and I was the unfortunate bystander to be in it. He and I have talked. We're fine. We both view it as lost opportunities. After he and I talked it out and agreed to disagree, Bobby came to the crash site asking me if I wanted a ride. Somehow I don't remember...but seconds later fists were thrown between Cale and Bobby. I tried to get into the fight and got scratched in the cheek by Cale. I later kicked him when Bobby mopped him into the mud. All of us were fined $6,000 but between Daytona 500 and this fight, today it's worth every penny to be involved in a fight that got NASCAR on the map."

Yarborough unsurprisingly has a different account of the story: "If they look at the video they'll realize I was forced in the mud by Donnie. I was going to pass Donnie and win the race but he forced me in the mud and I had no control. So hell I hit him back. If I wouldn't finish the race neither would he. He and I had a civil talk after the wreck and we were fine until Bobby Allison climbed out of the car and began shouting at me. It went chaotic from there."

According to the three during an interview in 2012 at the NASCAR Hall of Fame, NASCAR later refunded the fines as a reward to them for bringing NASCAR into national spotlights. Allison however complains to this day that because he only made $4,000 in the race, he had his wife Judy help pay the fine (by contributing $2,000) and he was only refunded with $4,000 by officials.

== Pocono and tragedies ==
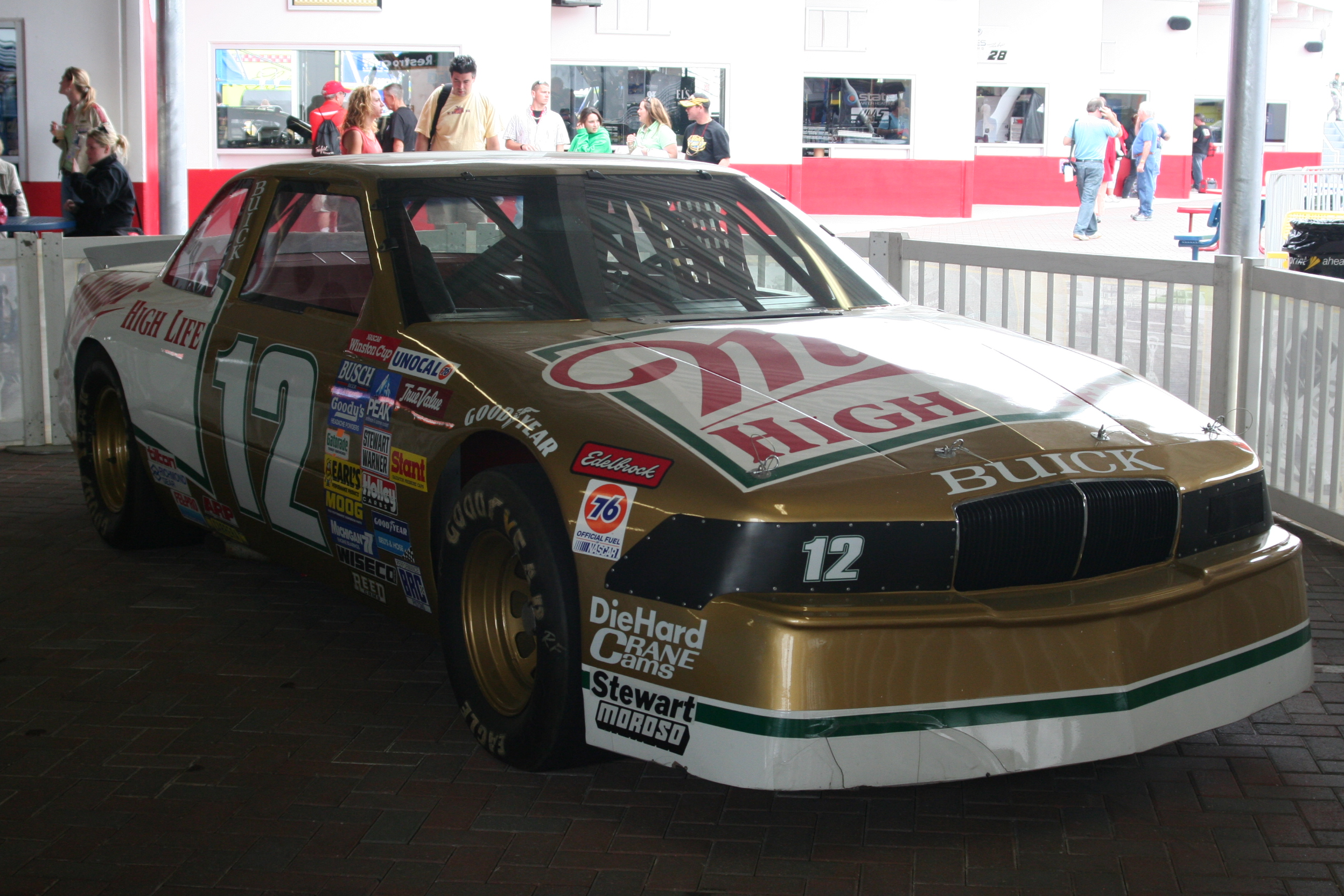
1988 racecar

On June 19, 1988, at the midpoint of the 1988 season, Allison crashed on the first lap of the Miller High Life 500. Initially he survived a head-on hit into the outside barrier but then suddenly Jocko Maggiacomo T-boned Allison in the driver's side of the car, nearly killing Allison. When he reached a local hospital he was initially declared dead, but subsequent medical assistance saved his life. Beginning from a vegetative state, Allison entered a rehab program. After regaining most of his memory and re-learning everyday activities, Allison prepared to attempt a comeback in the early 1990s. However, a series of tragedies led Allison to abort his comeback attempt, thus retiring from driving in NASCAR.

In 1992, Allison's younger son, Clifford, was fatally injured in a practice crash for the NASCAR Busch Series race (now O'Reilly Auto Parts Series) at Michigan International Speedway.

Later in 1993, his son Davey was killed in a helicopter accident at Talladega Superspeedway. Three years after these tragedies, he and his wife Judy divorced. Four years after their divorce, while attending their daughter-in-law's wedding, they reconnected. They were remarried in July 2000 and remained together until her death in 2015. He was inducted into the Motorsports Hall of Fame of America in 1992, and inducted into the NASCAR Hall of Fame in May 2011, along with Lee Petty, Bud Moore, David Pearson, and Ned Jarrett.

Allison is one of ten drivers to have won what was then considered a career Grand Slam (an unofficial term) by winning the sport's four majors: the Daytona 500, the Winston 500, the Coca-Cola 600, and the Southern 500. Only nine other drivers have accomplished this feat: Richard Petty, David Pearson, Darrell Waltrip, Dale Earnhardt, Jeff Gordon, Jimmie Johnson, Buddy Baker, Kevin Harvick & Denny Hamlin.

== Career wins controversy ==
Officially, Allison has won 85 Cup Series races, placing him in fourth place on the all-time wins list, just one ahead of Darrell Waltrip. Unofficially, Allison may be credited with 86 wins. The controversy lies in two races: the 1971 Myers Brothers 250 held at Bowman Gray Stadium (Winston-Salem, North Carolina; win was reawarded in 2024), and the 1973 National 500 at Charlotte Motor Speedway. (Charlotte, North Carolina.)

=== 1971 Myers Brothers 250 ===
Due to reduced sponsorship money being given out by the "Big Three" automobile companies in Detroit, some Winston Cup teams chose not to enter some of the smaller prize-money races of the large 48-event season (only fourteen cars entered the 1971 Space City 300), leading NASCAR to allow its "minor league" Grand American Series drivers (itself suffering from a massive decrease in events versus its 1970 season) to enter six of the Winston Cup races. For these races, Grand American Series "pony cars", such as the Chevrolet Camaro, Ford Mustang, and AMC Javelin, were competing against the larger Grand National Series cars, featuring the Chevrolet Chevelle, Ford Torino Talladega, Dodge Charger Daytona, and Plymouth Roadrunner Superbird.

The 1971 Myers Brothers 250 was held August 6, 1971, at Bowman Gray Stadium in Winston-Salem, North Carolina. The first car to cross the finish line after 250 laps was driven by Allison. Knowing that the pony car would handle better on the flat track of that race, and the race following at West Virginia International Speedway, Allison had chosen to race his Grand American 1970 Ford Mustang, No. 49, sponsored by Rollins Leasing, and owned by Melvin Joseph. (Joseph was the head of Dover International Speedway until his death in 2005.) As he was not racing in a Grand National car, he never received credit in that series, but was credited with a Grand American Series win.

NASCAR has had co-sanctioned races with various series in the past; in such cases, the win counts only in the series which that driver's car was sanctioned. The driver tied with Allison in all-time Cup wins because of the dispute is involved in this incident. An Automobile Racing Club of America/Winston West combination race in College Station, Texas on March 21, 1993, was won by Darrell Waltrip, driving an ARCA entry. That win was credited as an ARCA win only, and not counted in the NASCAR K&N Pro Series West (as it is currently known) win list. Likewise, when a Winston Cup driver won a Winston Cup/Winston West combination race, the win counts in Cup, not West. The Busch Series and Busch North Series also raced combination races in the past. Currently, Bristol Motor Speedway has such a race, with the Whelen Modified Tour and Whelen Southern Modified Tour.

On October 23, 2024, NASCAR officials awarded Bobby Allison this win, bringing his win total to 85 wins, surpassing Darrell Waltrip.

=== 1973 National 500 ===
The 1973 National 500 was held October 7, 1973 at Charlotte Motor Speedway in Concord, North Carolina. The first three cars to cross the finish line after the scheduled 334 laps (501 miles) were driven by Cale Yarborough, Richard Petty, and Bobby Allison, in that order. Again, these facts are not disputed. What is disputed is the legality of the first two cars' engines, recounted in Jim McLaurin's book NASCAR's Most Wanted, in the chapter "Fudgin' With the Rules":

In the 1973 National 500 at Charlotte Motor Speedway, Allison protested that the engines in winner Cale Yarborough's and second-place Richard Petty's cars were over-sized. NASCAR inspected all three of the top finishers, and Allison's engine fit the cubic-displacement specs. Six hours after the inspections began, NASCAR technical director Bill Gazaway told the press that the results were being sent to headquarters in Daytona for a final decision.

Monday afternoon NASCAR released a statement saying that, because the inspection facilities at Charlotte were inadequate, the pre-race inspection numbers would be used-when all three cars were legal and that the results would stand.

Allison threatened both to quit and to sue. It was not until after a private meeting with NASCAR President Bill France Jr., a week later that Allison was assuaged. Speculation was that Allison had been bought off. Allison wouldn't confirm or deny it, saying only that he had "received satisfactory restitution". The results were never changed. 1973 was a transition year in NASCAR. Teams could run a restrictor plate-equipped 7-liter engine or a 5.9 liter engine without restrictor plates. A decade later, Petty's over sized engine at the same race resulted in new NASCAR rules being implemented against oversized engines, including the possibility of twelve-week suspensions for the offending engine builder, driver, and car owner.

=== 1982 Daytona 500 ===
Following his victory at Daytona, Allison's car was inspected and was found to have lost its rear bumper, which appeared to have fallen off in a slight bump between two cars at the beginning of the race, causing a multi-car accident. Tests were performed on the car without its rear bumper and it was discovered that the car was faster and handled better without the bumper (better underside aerodynamics and over 70 lb (32 kg) lighter). It has been claimed that Allison and his crew modified the bumper so that it would fall off easily at the beginning of the race. NASCAR never fined him and the victory stands. Allison and his crew denied the allegations. In the Allison biography Miracle, Allison explained that NASCAR inspectors told the DiGard crew to move the bumper on its mounting points. The team simply tack-welded the bumper back on at an acceptable position, but "forgot" to properly secure it.

== Car owner ==
Allison drove his own cars for portions of the early 1970s, including the full 1973 season. Allison won six races as an owner-driver from 1970 to 1974. Allison also ran for his own team in 1977 after splitting with Roger Penske, with a best finish of second at Nashville.

In 1985 Allison returned to being an owner-driver after leaving DiGard Motorsports, taking his number (22) and sponsor (Miller American) with him to his new team. His best finish as an owner-driver in 1985 was a fourth-place finish at Dover. Following the 1985 season he brought his number and sponsor with him to the Stavola Brothers Racing team.

In 1990 Allison revived his team and was a car owner for numerous drivers, most notably Mike Alexander, Hut Stricklin, Jimmy Spencer, and Derrike Cope. Stricklin was Donnie Allison's son-in-law.

The car number raced was No. 12 and sponsors included Raybestos Brakes from 1990 to 1992 and, in 1993, Meineke. Stricklin moved to the Junior Johnson & Associates team halfway through 1992 and Raybestos left at the end of the year for the Stavola Brothers No. 8 team. For the 1994 season, the team partnered with Ron Zook, for Cup and Busch Series. For 1995 and 1996, the team was sponsored by Mane 'n Tail with Derrike Cope at the wheel. Allison was forced to close down the team due to financial problems after the 1996 season.

== Later life and death ==
Allison actively promoted rail safety for the CSX "Keep on Living" campaign with appearances at Talladega and Daytona. On March 6, 2008, his mother, Kittie Allison, died in Charlotte, North Carolina, at the age of 101. On May 23, 2011, Bobby Allison was inducted into the NASCAR Hall of Fame.

Judy Allison, Bobby's wife of 55 years, died December 18, 2015, following complications from surgery.

Allison died in Mooresville, North Carolina, on November 9, 2024, at the age of 86. His family announced his death that same day, prior to the NASCAR Xfinity Series Championship Race.

== Motorsports career results ==
=== NASCAR ===
(key) (Bold – Pole position awarded by qualifying time. Italics – Pole position earned by points standings or practice time. * – Most laps led.)

==== Grand National Series ====
NASCAR Grand National Series results
Year	Team	No.	Make	1	2	3	4	5	6	7	8	9	10	11	12	13	14	15	16	17	18	19	20	21	22	23	24	25	26	27	28	29	30	31	32	33	34	35	36	37	38	39	40	41	42	43	44	45	46	47	48	49	50	51	52	53	54	55	NGNC	Pts	Ref
1961	Ralph Stark	40	Chevy	CLT	JSP	DAY	DAY; 20	DAY; 31	PIF	AWS	HMS	ATL; 37	GPS	HBO	BGS	MAR	NWS	CLB	HCY	RCH	MAR	DAR	CLT	CLT	RSD	ASP	CLT; 51	PIF	BIR	GPS	BGS	NOR	HAS	STR	DAY	ATL	CLB	MBS	BRI	NSV	BGS	AWS	RCH	SBO	DAR	HCY	RCH	CSF	ATL	MAR	NWS	CLT	BRI	GPS	HBO				106th	-	
1965	Bobby Allison Motorsports	2	Ford	RSD; 29																																																							34th	6152	
1965	Bobby Allison Motorsports	12	Ford		DAY; 7	DAY	DAY; 11	PIF	ASW	RCH	HBO	ATL; 7	GPS	NWS	MAR	CLB	BRI	DAR	LGY	BGS	HCY	CLT	CCF	ASH	HAR	NSV																																	34th	6152	
1965	Ed Grady	09	Ford																								BIR; 7	ATL; 38	GPS	MBS	VAL	DAY; 25	ODS	OBS	ISP	GLN	BRI; 32	NSV	CCF	AWS	SMR	PIF	AUG	CLB	DTS	BLV	BGS	DAR	HCY	LIN	ODS	RCH	MAR	NWS	CLT	HBO	CAR	DTS	34th	6152	
1966	Betty Lilly	24	Ford	AUG	RSD; 12	DAY	DAY; 31	DAY; 20	CAR; 3	BRI; 28	ATL; 10	HCY	CLB	GPS	BGS; 4	NWS; 26	MAR; 7	DAR; 16	LGY	MGR; 3	MON	RCH																																					10th	19910	
1966	Smokey Yunick Racing	22	Chevy																				CLT; 43	DTS	ASH	PIF	SMR	AWS																															10th	19910	
1966	J.D. Bracken	2	Chevy																										BLV; 15	GPS	DAY; 14	**ODS**; 15	BRR; 23	**OXF**; 1*	FON; 27	ISP; 1	BRI; 5	SMR; 5	NSV; 3	ATL; 10	**CLB**; 11	AWS; 8	**BLV**; 1*	BGS; 18	DAR; 36	HCY; 7	RCH; 20	HBO	MAR; 3*	NWS; 30	CLT	CAR; 41							10th	19910	
1967	J.D. Bracken	2	Chevy	AUG; 14	RSD; 24				AWS; 3	BRI; 19	GPS; 21	**BGS**; 1		CLB; 19	HCY; 5*	NWS; 6		SVH; 1*														TRN; 9	OXF; 1	FDA; 2	ISP; 6*	BRI; 30	SMR; 5	NSV; 14		BGS; 3	CLB; 4*	SVH; 14	DAR; 32	HCY; 18	RCH; 19	BLV; 2	HBO; 7	MAR; 22	NWS; 4										4th	30812	
1967	Bud Moore Engineering	16	Mercury			DAY; 15	DAY	DAY; 40					ATL; 9				MAR; 20																																										4th	30812	
1967	Owens Racing	6	Dodge																RCH; 2	DAR; 4	BLV; 3	LGY; 2	CLT; 3	ASH			BIR; 1	CAR; 36	GPS	MGY; 3	DAY; 7																												4th	30812	
1967	George Davis	07	Chevy																						MGR; 4	SMR																																	4th	30812	
1967	K&K Insurance Racing	37	Dodge																																				ATL; 11											CLT; 13									4th	30812	
1967	Holman Moody	11	Ford																																																CAR; 1*	**AWS**; 1*							4th	30812	
1968	Holman Moody	11	Ford	MGR; 1*	MGY; 2																																																						11th	2454	
1968	Bondy Long	29	Ford			RSD; 4	DAY; 3	BRI; 36	RCH	ATL; 19	HCY	GPS	CLB	NWS; 29	MAR; 26	AUG	AWS	DAR; 23	BLV	LGY	CLT; 28	ASH	MGR	SMR																																			11th	2454	
1968	J.D. Bracken	2	Chevy																						BIR; 5	CAR; 2	GPS	DAY; 31	ISP; 1	OXF; 4	FDA; 3	TRN; 3	BRI; 25	SMR; 17	NSV; 3	ATL; 24	CLB; 17	BGS; 14	AWS; 12	SBO; 16	LGY; 4	DAR; 7	HCY; 17	RCH; 4	BLV; 2	HBO; 6	MAR; 14												11th	2454	
1968	Friedkin Enterprises	14	Plymouth																																													**NWS**; 4	**AUG**; 2*	CLT; 4	CAR; 5	JFC; 27							11th	2454	
1969	Friedkin Enterprises	14	Plymouth	MGR; 19	MGY; 1																																																						20th	2055	
1969	Mario Rossi	22	Plymouth			RSD; 15	DAY																																																				20th	2055	
1969	Mario Rossi	22	Dodge					DAY; 22	DAY; 43	CAR; 2	AUG	BRI; 1	ATL; 4	CLB	HCY	GPS	RCH	NWS; 1*	**MAR**; 3*	AWS	DAR; 4*	BLV	LGY	CLT; 41			MCH; 30	KPT	GPS	NCF	DAY; 22	DOV	TPN	TRN; 2	BLV	BRI; 26	NSV	SMR	ATL; 6	MCH; 5	SBO	BGS	AWS	DAR; 5	HCY	RCH; 1*	TAL; Wth	CLB	MAR; 25	NWS	CLT; 2	SVH	AUG	CAR; 39	JFC	MGR; 1	TWS; 23		20th	2055	
1969	Bobby Allison Motorsports	2	Chevy																						MGR; 6	SMR; 16																																	20th	2055	
1970	Mario Rossi	22	Dodge	RSD; 13	DAY	DAY; 3	DAY; 3	RCH	**CAR**; 4		ATL; 1		TAL; 29			DAR; 20			CLT; 39			MCH; 17	**RSD**; 2				DAY; 3			TRN; 2				ATL; 7			MCH; 2	TAL; 13			DAR; 10			DOV; 2		NWS; 4	CLT; 2	**MAR**; 2		CAR; 3									2nd	3860	
1970	Robertson Racing	22	Plymouth							SVH; 19		BRI; 2		NWS; 6																																													2nd	3860	
1970	Bobby Allison Motorsports	22	Dodge												CLB; 2		BLV; 3	LGY; 2		**SMR**; 12	MAR; 2				KPT; 4	GPS; 2		AST; 2	TPN; 7		BRI; 1*	SMR; 17	NSV; 2		CLB; 3	**ONA**; 11			BGS; 2	SBO; 3		HCY; 3	RCH; 2		NCF; 6				MGR; 4		LGY; 1*								2nd	3860	
1970	Neil Castles	88	Dodge																					HCY; 15																																			2nd	3860	
1971	Bobby Allison Motorsports	12	Dodge	RSD; 2	DAY	DAY; 24	DAY; 18	ONT; 39	RCH; 4	CAR; 30	**HCY**; 20	BRI; 4	ATL; 10	CLB; 7	GPS; 20	SMR	NWS; 5	MAR; 6	DAR; 21	SBO								**HOU**; 1*							NSV; 27							HCY; 4																	4th	3636	
1971	Holman Moody	12	Mercury																		TAL; 2*	ASH	KPT	CLT; 1*	DOV; 1*	**MCH**; 1				DAY; 6		AST; 20	ISP; 4			ATL; 2			MCH; 1*	TAL; 1*	CLB		**DAR**; 1*		CLT; 1	**DOV**; 4*	CAR; 3				TWS; 3								4th	3636	
1971	Holman Moody	12	Dodge																								**RSD**; 1*																																4th	3636	
1971	Holman Moody	12	Ford																										**GPS**; 20*		BRI; 2			TRN; 3										MAR; 2				**MGR**; 1*	RCH; 2	NWS; 21									4th	3636	
1971	Melvin Joseph	49	Ford																																		BGS; 1*	**ONA**; 2																					4th	3636	

==== Winston Cup Series ====
NASCAR Winston Cup Series results
Year	Team	No.	Make	1	2	3	4	5	6	7	8	9	10	11	12	13	14	15	16	17	18	19	20	21	22	23	24	25	26	27	28	29	30	31	NWCC	Pts	Ref
1972	Junior Johnson & Associates	12	Chevy	RSD; 2*	DAY; 16	**RCH**; 2*	ONT; 2	**CAR**; 27*	**ATL**; 1*	**BRI**; 1*	DAR; 7	NWS; 2	**MAR**; 2	TAL; 45	**CLT**; 2*	DOV; 1*	MCH; 2	RSD; 6	TWS; 2	DAY; 3	**BRI**; 1*	TRN; 1	ATL; 1	TAL; 3	MCH; 2	**NSV**; 1*	**DAR**; 1*	**RCH**; 2	**DOV**; 20	**MAR**; 2*	NWS; 2*	CLT; 1*	CAR; 1*	TWS; 4	2nd	8573.5	
1973	Bobby Allison Motorsports	12	Chevy	RSD; 2	DAY; 25	**RCH**; 15	CAR; 4	BRI; 3	ATL; 35	**NWS**; 4	DAR; 3	MAR; 32	TAL; 42	NSV; 5	CLT	DOV; 3	TWS; 26	RSD; 1*	MCH; 4	**DAY**; 30	BRI; 20	ATL; 27	**TAL**; 29	NSV; 22	DAR; 6	**RCH**; 3	DOV; 2	**NWS**; 1	MAR; 3	CLT; 3	CAR; 4				7th	6272.3	
1974	Bobby Allison Motorsports	12	Chevy	RSD; 5	DAY; 30	**RCH**; 1*	CAR; 3	BRI; 4	ATL; 26	DAR; 2	**NWS**; 3	MAR; 3	TAL; 31	**NSV**; 20	DOV; 28	CLT; 3	RSD; 2	MCH; 23		BRI; 5	NSV; 2														4th	2019.19	
1974	Penske Racing	16	AMC																DAY; 5*																4th	2019.19	
1974	Bobby Allison Motorsports	12	AMC																			ATL; 28	POC; 21	TAL; 3											4th	2019.19	
1974	Penske Racing	12	AMC																						MCH; 5	DAR; 30	RCH	DOV; 13	NWS	MAR	CLT; 5	CAR; 4	ONT; 1		4th	2019.19	
1975	Penske Racing	16	AMC	**RSD**; 1*	DAY; 2	RCH	CAR	BRI	ATL; 30	NWS	DAR; 1	MAR; 4	TAL; 35	NSV	DOV	CLT	**RSD**; 2*	MCH; 22	DAY; 35	NSV	**POC**; 31	TAL; 29	MCH; 4	DAR; 1	DOV; 28	NWS	MAR; 3	CLT; 31	RCH	CAR; 2	BRI	ATL; 26	ONT; 5		24th	2181	
1976	Penske Racing	2	AMC	**RSD**; 15																															4th	4097	
1976	Penske Racing	2	Mercury		DAY; 25	CAR; 21	**RCH**; 3	BRI; 5	ATL; 29	NWS; 3	DAR; 18	MAR; 6	TAL; 3	NSV; 5	DOV; 4	CLT; 4	RSD; 2	MCH; 3	DAY; 3	NSV; 7	POC; 24	TAL; 23	MCH; 4	BRI; 6	DAR; 9	RCH; 2	DOV; 4	MAR; 27	NWS; 29	CLT; 3	CAR; 4	ATL; 26	ONT; 33		4th	4097	
1977	Bobby Allison Motorsports	12	AMC	RSD; 35	DAY; 15	RCH; 5	CAR; 27	ATL; 41	NWS; 5	DAR; 29	BRI; 6	MAR; 19	TAL; 40	NSV; 7	DOV; 8	CLT; 39	RSD; 17	MCH; 10	DAY; 17	NSV; 2	POC; 4	TAL; 7	MCH; 26	BRI; 28	DAR; 39	RCH; 6	DOV; 9	MAR; 23	NWS; 4	CLT; 26	CAR; 6	ATL; 9	ONT; 7		8th	3467	
1978	Bud Moore Engineering	15	Ford	RSD; 30	DAY; 1	RCH; 6	CAR; 2	ATL; 1*	BRI; 21	**DAR**; 14	NWS; 6	MAR; 6	TAL; 38	DOV; 8	CLT; 3	NSV; 21	RSD; 3	MCH; 24	DAY; 27	NSV; 7	POC; 3	TAL; 6	MCH; 5	BRI; 22	DAR; 5	RCH; 2	DOV; 1*	MAR; 7	NWS; 3	CLT; 1*	CAR; 2	ATL; 6	ONT; 1*		2nd	4367	
1979	Bud Moore Engineering	15	Ford	RSD; 19	DAY; 11	**CAR**; 1*	**RCH**; 2*	ATL; 2*	NWS; 1	BRI; 2	DAR; 26	MAR; 4	TAL; 1	NSV; 3	DOV; 4	CLT; 22	TWS; 2	RSD; 1	MCH; 7	DAY; 30	NSV; 16	POC; 9	TAL; 28	MCH; 23	BRI; 3	**DAR**; 10	RCH; 1*	DOV; 6	MAR; 4	CLT; 2	NWS; 2*	CAR; 19	ATL; 4	ONT; 2	3rd	4633	
1980	Bud Moore Engineering	15	Ford	RSD; 18		RCH; 2	CAR; 7	ATL; 3	BRI; 3	DAR; 30	**NWS**; 3	MAR; 25		NSV; 5	DOV; 1		TWS; 3	RSD; 15*	MCH; 8		NSV; 6	POC; 34			BRI; 6	DAR; 6	RCH; 1*	DOV; 30	NWS; 1*	MAR; 22		CAR; 26		ONT; 4	6th	4019	
1980	Bud Moore Engineering	15	Mercury		DAY; 2								TAL; 40			CLT; 26				DAY; 1*			TAL; 35	MCH; 7							CLT; 29		**ATL**; 38		6th	4019	
1981	Ranier-Lundy Racing	28	Chevy	RSD; 1*		RCH; 23																				DAR; 9					CLT; 2				2nd	4827	
1981	Ranier-Lundy Racing	28	Pontiac		**DAY**; 2*		CAR; 6	ATL; 4	BRI; 3	NWS; 2*		MAR; 13		NSV; 3																					2nd	4827	
1981	Ranier-Lundy Racing	28	Buick								DAR; 9		**TAL**; 1		DOV; 2	CLT; 1*	TWS; 3	RSD; 29	MCH; 1	DAY; 28	NSV; 2	POC; 25	TAL; 5*	MCH; 7	BRI; 4		RCH; 5	DOV; 3	MAR; 10	NWS; 2		CAR; 2	ATL; 4	RSD; 1*	2nd	4827	
1982	DiGard Motorsports	88	Buick	DAY; 1*			ATL; 22					TAL; 13			CLT; 3	POC; 1*		MCH; 4	DAY; 1*		POC; 1		MCH; 1*		DAR; 20		DOV; 10		CLT; 9*			ATL; 1*			2nd	4417	
1982	DiGard Motorsports	88	Chevy		RCH; 8	BRI; 5		CAR; 4	DAR; 25	NWS; 8	MAR; 17		NSV; 6	DOV; 1*			RSD; 27			NSV; 19				BRI; 2*		**RCH**; 1*		NWS; 23		MAR; 19	CAR; 2*				2nd	4417	
1982	DiGard Motorsports	88	Pontiac																			TAL; 10											RSD; 16		2nd	4417	
1983	DiGard Motorsports	22	Chevy	DAY; 9	RCH; 1	CAR; 10																													1st	4667	
1983	DiGard Motorsports	22	Buick				ATL; 25	DAR; 8	NWS; 2	MAR; 3	TAL; 10	NSV; 2	DOV; 1*	BRI; 2	CLT; 3*	RSD; 22	POC; 1*	MCH; 2	DAY; 14	NSV; 4	POC; 3*	TAL; 9*	MCH; 34	BRI; 3	DAR; 1*	RCH; 1*	DOV; 1*	MAR; 2	NWS; 3	CLT; 7	CAR; 16	ATL; 3*	RSD; 9		1st	4667	
1984	DiGard Motorsports	22	Buick	DAY; 34	RCH; 30	CAR; 1	ATL; 5	BRI; 19	NWS; 22	DAR; 20	MAR; 4*	TAL; 4	NSV; 12	DOV; 12	CLT; 1*	RSD; 3	POC; 7	MCH; 6	DAY; 4	NSV; 5	POC; 28	TAL; 4	MCH; 11	BRI; 2	DAR; 10	RCH; 25	DOV; 36	MAR; 23	CLT; 10	NWS; 3	CAR; 5	ATL; 5	RSD; 7*		6th	4094	
1985	DiGard Motorsports	22	Buick	DAY; 33	RCH; 16	CAR; 31	ATL; 5	BRI; 13	DAR; 10	NWS; 3	MAR; 4	TAL; 4	DOV; 13	CLT; 3	RSD; 3	POC; 9	MCH; 6	DAY; 18																	12th	3312	
1985	Bobby Allison Motorsports	22	Buick																POC; 12			BRI; 22		RCH; 28		MAR; 10	NWS; 31		CAR; 38	ATL; 26	RSD; 17				12th	3312	
1985	Bobby Allison Motorsports	22	Chevy																	TAL; 27															12th	3312	
1985	Bobby Allison Motorsports	22	Ford																		MCH; 36		DAR; 30		DOV; 4			CLT; 14							12th	3312	
1986	Stavola Brothers Racing	22	Buick	DAY; 42	RCH; 4	CAR; 34	ATL; 9	BRI; 6	DAR; 3	NWS; 6	MAR; 8	TAL; 1	DOV; 2	CLT; 12	RSD; 7	POC; 13	MCH; 11	DAY; 15	POC; 5	TAL; 10	GLN; 12	MCH; 24	BRI; 8	DAR; 2	RCH; 8	DOV; 20	MAR; 21	NWS; 22	CLT; 41	CAR; 25	ATL; 16	RSD; 7			7th	3698	
1987	Stavola Brothers Racing	22	Buick	DAY; 6	CAR; 13	RCH; 9	ATL; 19	DAR; 28	NWS; 14	BRI; 23	MAR; 8	TAL; 39	CLT; 22	DOV; 25	POC; 6	RSD; 8	MCH; 27	DAY; 1	POC; 27	TAL; 12	GLN; 9	MCH; 7	BRI; 22	DAR; 26	RCH; 12	DOV; 7	MAR; 8	NWS; 17	**CLT**; 2*	CAR; 38	RSD; 5	ATL; 4			9th	3530	
1988	Stavola Brothers Racing	12	Buick	DAY; 1*	RCH; 11	CAR; 22	ATL; 11	DAR; 9	BRI; 5	NWS; 20	MAR; 8	TAL; 2	CLT; 17	DOV; 10	RSD; 22	POC; 39	MCH	DAY	POC	TAL	GLN	MCH	BRI	DAR	RCH	DOV	MAR	CLT	NWS	CAR	PHO	ATL			33rd	1654	

===== Daytona 500 =====
Year	Team	Manufacturer	Start	Finish
1961	Ralph Stark	Chevrolet	36	31
1965	Bobby Allison Motorsports	Ford	13	11
1966	Betty Lilly	Ford	44	20
1967	Bud Moore Engineering	Mercury	31	40
1968	Bondy Long	Ford	6	3
1969	Mario Rossi	Dodge	41	43
1970	Mario Rossi	Dodge	6	3
1971	Bobby Allison Motorsports	Dodge	31	18
1972	Howard & Egerton Racing	Chevy	4	16
1973	Bobby Allison Motorsports	Chevy	29	25
1974	Bobby Allison Motorsports	Chevy	9	30
1975	Penske Racing	AMC	3	2
1976	Penske Racing	Mercury	8	25
1977	Bobby Allison Motorsports	AMC	7	15
1978	Bud Moore Engineering	Ford	33	**1**
1979	Bud Moore Engineering	Ford	7	11
1980	Bud Moore Engineering	Mercury	9	2
1981	Ranier-Lundy Racing	Pontiac	**1**	2
1982	DiGard Motorsports	Buick	7	**1**
1983	DiGard Motorsports	Chevy	35	9
1984	DiGard Motorsports	Buick	4	34
1985	DiGard Motorsports	Buick	34	33
1986	Stavola Brothers Racing	Buick	3	42
1987	Stavola Brothers Racing	Buick	6	6
1988	Stavola Brothers Racing	Buick	3	**1**

==== Busch Series ====
NASCAR Busch Series results
Year	Team	No.	Make	1	2	3	4	5	6	7	8	9	10	11	12	13	14	15	16	17	18	19	20	21	22	23	24	25	26	27	28	29	30	31	32	33	34	35	NBSC	Pts	Ref
1982	Bobby Allison Motorsports	25	Pontiac	DAY	RCH	BRI	MAR	DAR	HCY	SBO	CRW	RCH	LGY	DOV; 9	HCY	CLT; 5	ASH	HCY	SBO	CAR	CRW	SBO	HCY	LGY	IRP; 9	BRI	HCY	RCH	MAR										39th	596	
1982	Plessinger Racing	88	Pontiac																											CLT; 3	HCY	MAR							39th	596	
1983	Plessinger Racing	88	Pontiac	DAY; 17	RCH	CAR; 2	HCY	MAR	NWS	SBO	GPS	LGY																											30th	819	
1983	A.G. Dillard Motorsports	22	Pontiac										DOV; 2*	BRI																DAR; 37	RCH	NWS	SBO	MAR	ROU				30th	819	
1983	A.G. Dillard Motorsports	22	Olds												CLT; 5	SBO	HCY	ROU	SBO	ROU	CRW	ROU	SBO	HCY	LGY	IRP	GPS	BRI	HCY							CLT; 4	HCY	MAR	30th	819	
1984	A.G. Dillard Motorsports	22	Olds	DAY; 5	RCH	CAR; 32	HCY	MAR	DAR; 3	ROU	NSV	LGY	MLW; 4	DOV; 6												DAR; 24	RCH	NWS	CLT	HCY	CAR; 31	MAR							27th	1129	
1984	Plessinger Racing	22	Olds												CLT; 1	SBO	HCY	ROU	SBO	ROU	HCY																		27th	1129	
1984	A.G. Dillard Motorsports	23	Pontiac																			IRP; 24	LGY	SBO	BRI														27th	1129	
1985	A.G. Dillard Motorsports	22	Buick	DAY; 2	CAR; 27	HCY	BRI	MAR	DAR; 30	SBO	LGY	DOV; 26	CLT; 8	SBO	HCY	ROU	IRP	SBO	LGY	HCY	MLW	BRI	DAR	RCH	NWS	ROU	CLT; 38	HCY	CAR; 30	MAR									35th	674	
1986	Bobby Allison Motorsports	85	Buick	DAY	CAR	HCY	MAR	BRI	DAR	SBO	LGY	JFC	DOV; 27	CLT; 33	SBO	HCY	ROU										DAR; 27	RCH	DOV	MAR	ROU	CLT; 6	CAR; 19	MAR					36th	701	
1986	Bobby Allison Motorsports	7	Buick															IRP; 6	SBO	RAL	OXF; 32	SBO	HCY	LGY	ROU	BRI													36th	701	
1987	Bobby Allison Motorsports	33	Buick	DAY; 31	HCY	MAR	DAR; 8	BRI	LGY	SBO	CLT	DOV	IRP; 28	ROU	JFC	OXF	SBO	HCY	RAL	LGY	ROU	BRI	JFC	DAR	RCH	DOV	MAR	CLT; 5	CAR; 37	MAR									43rd	356	
1988	Bobby Allison Motorsports	12	Buick	DAY; 1	HCY	CAR	MAR	DAR; 30	BRI; 30	LNG	NZH; 3	SBO	NSV	CLT; 3	DOV	ROU	LAN	LVL	MYB	OXF	SBO	HCY	LNG	IRP	ROU	BRI	DAR	RCH	DOV	MAR	CLT	CAR	MAR						37th	656	

==== Grand National East Series ====
NASCAR Grand National East Series results
Year	Team	No.	Make	1	2	3	4	5	6	7	8	9	10	11	12	13	14	15	NGNEC	Pts	Ref
1972	Junior Johnson & Associates	12	Chevy	JSP	**HCY**; 1*	GPS													16th	553.25	
1972	Melvin Joseph	49	Ford				CLB; 6	**NSV**; 1*	SMR	ONA; 1*	MBS	**AST**; 14*	**ISP**; 14						16th	553.25	
1972	Bobby Allison Motorsports	12	Chevy											CLB; 2			LPS; 27	CLB; 1	16th	553.25	
1972	Melvin Joseph	49	Chevy												HCY; 19	BGS			16th	553.25	
1973	Gordon Racing	24	Chevy	HCY; 2	**CLB**; 1*	ROU	SEL	LIN	WCS	TOL	SLM								7th	775.5	
1973	Bobby Allison Motorsports	12	Chevy									HEI; 13	HCY; 4	**CIS**; 1*	BLN	MCS	**CIS**; 17	HCY; 3	7th	775.5	

==== Busch North Series ====
NASCAR Busch North Series results
Year	Team	No.	Make	1	2	3	4	5	6	7	8	9	10	11	12	13	14	15	16	17	18	19	20	21	22	23	NBNSC	Pts	Ref
1987	Bobby Allison Motorsports	33	Buick	DAR	OXF	SEE	OXF	DOV	IRP	CNB; 19	JEN	OXF	EPP	OXF	STA	HOL	TIO										NA	–	
1987		13																OXF; 27	UNI	DAR	SPE	DOV	SEE	CLT	OXF	CAR	NA	–	

==== Winston West Series ====
NASCAR Winston West Series results
Year	Team	No.	Make	1	2	3	4	5	6	7	8	9	10	11	12	13	14	15	16	17	18	19	20	21	22	NWWSC	Pts	Ref
1965	Bobby Allison Motorsports	2	Ford	CHS	RSD; 29	SJS	ASP	POR	EVG	CHS	POR	ASP	POR	ASP	ASP	CSF	ASP									NA	–	
1975		26	Chevy	RSD	LAG	MSP	ASP	RSD	ASP	USP	POR	EVG	SMS	CRS	CSP	ASP	EVG	YAK	POR; 8*	MSP	ONT					50th	79.75	
1977	Bobby Allison Motorsports	12	AMC	RSD	LAG	ONT	SJS	MMR	ASP	RSD	SGS	YAK	EVG	WSP	USP	POR	AAS	CRS	ASP	SHA	POR	ONT	PHO; 3			59th	125.5	
1978	Cook & Sons	12	Ford	RSD	AAS	S99; 3	SHA; 22	PET	MMR	RSD	IFS	YAK	WSP	LSP	EVG	POR	CRS	ASP	SON; 10	SHA	CBS	YAK	OSS	ONT		NA	–	
1978	Bobby Allison Motorsports	1	AMC																						PHO; 3	NA	–	
1979	Cook & Sons	12	Ford	RSD	MMR	RSD	EVG	YAK	POR	AAS	SHA	CRS	SON; 5	EVG	SPO	POR	ASP	ONT								54th	49	
1979	Bobby Allison Motorsports	12	AMC																PHO; 2							54th	49	
1980	Cook & Sons	12	Ford	RSD	ONT	S99	RSD	LAG; 7	EVG																	41st	44	
1980	Esau Racing	15	Pontiac							POR; 1*	SON															41st	44	
1980	Williamson Racing	9	Olds									MMR; 1*	ONT													41st	44	
1980	Ulrich Racing	4	Chevy											PHO; 2*												41st	44	
1981	Ranier-Lundy Racing	28	Pontiac	RSD	S99	AAS	MMR	RSD	LAG; 6	POR	WSP	EVG	SHA	RSD	SON	RSD										38th	46	
1981	DiGard Motorsports	88	Buick														PHO; 4									38th	46	
1982	DiGard Motorsports	88	Chevy	MMR	S99	AAS	RSD	POR	WSP	SHA	EVG	SON	CDR	RSD	RSD	PHO; 1										31st	60	
1984	DiGard Motorsports	2	Buick	RSD	YAK	SIR	POR	EVG	SHA	WSR	SON	MMR	RSD	PHO; 21												44th	30	

=== ARCA Talladega SuperCar Series ===
(key) (Bold – Pole position awarded by qualifying time. Italics – Pole position earned by points standings or practice time. * – Most laps led.)

ARCA Talladega SuperCar Series results
Year	Team	No.	Make	1	2	3	4	5	6	7	8	9	10	11	12	13	ATSSC	Pts	Ref
1980	Bobby Allison Motorsports	12	AMC	DAY	NWS	FRS	FRS	MCH; 2	TAL	IMS	FRS	MCH					NA	–	
1982		88	Pontiac	NSV	DAY	TAL	FRS	CMS	WIN	NSV	TAT	TAL	FRS	BFS	MIL; 4	SND	NA	–	

=== International Race of Champions ===
(key) (Bold – Pole position. * – Most laps led.)

International Race of Champions results
Year	Make	Q1	Q2	Q3	1	2	3	4	Pos.	Pts	Ref
1973–74	Porsche				RSD; 11	RSD; 7	RSD; 9	DAY	9th	NA	
1974–75	Chevy				MCH; 4	RSD; 12	**RSD**; 1	DAY; 4	4th	NA	
1975–76	Chevy				MCH; 2	RSD; 11	RSD; 1	DAY; 7	4th	NA	
1978–79	Chevy	**MCH**; 1	MCH	RSD	RSD; 3	ATL; 3			4th	NA	
1979–80	Chevy	MCH; 2	MCH	RSD	RSD; 2	ATL; 1			1st	41	

=== American open-wheel racing ===
(key) (Races in bold indicate pole position)

==== USAC Championship Car ====
USAC Championship Car results
Year	Team	Chassis	Engine	1	2	3	4	5	6	7	8	9	10	11	12	13	14	15	16	Pos.	Pts
1973	Penske Racing	McLaren M16C	Offy 159 ci t	TWS	TRE	TRE	INDY; 32	MIL	POC	MCH	MIL	ONT	ONT	ONT	MCH	MCH	TRE	TWS	PHX	NC	0
1975	Penske Racing	McLaren M16C	Offy 159 ci t	ONT	ONT; 6	ONT; 32	PHX	TRE	INDY; 25	MIL	POC; 27	MCH; 17	MIL	MCH	TRE	PHX				NC	0

===== Indianapolis 500 =====
Year	Chassis	Engine	Start	Finish	Team
1973	McLaren	Offenhauser	12	32	Penske Racing
1975	McLaren	Offenhauser	13	25	Penske Racing

Sporting positions
Preceded by Darrell Waltrip	NASCAR Winston Cup Champion; 1983	Succeeded by Terry Labonte
Preceded by Mario Andretti	IROC Champion; IROC VII (1980)	Succeeded by Cale Yarborough
Achievements
Preceded by Cale Yarborough; Richard Petty; Bill Elliott	Daytona 500 Winner; 1978; 1982; 1988	Succeeded by Richard Petty; Cale Yarborough; Darrell Waltrip
