= Johnny Halford =

American racing driver (1930–2013)

- Born: October 15, 1930; Spartanburg, South Carolina, U.S.
- Died: October 11, 2013 (aged 82); Spartanburg, South Carolina, U.S.
- Height: 6 ft 6 in (1.98 m)

NASCAR Cup Series career
- 41 races run over 5 years
- Best finish: 36th (1970)
- First race: 1969 Sandlapper 200 (Columbia)
- Last race: 1978 American 500 (Rockingham)
Wins	Top tens	Poles
0	1	0

NASCAR Grand National East Series career
- 1 race run over 1 year
- First race: 1972 Greenville 200 (Greenville-Pickens)
Wins	Top tens	Poles
0	0	0

Johnny Halford (October 15, 1930 – October 11, 2013) was an American stock car racing driver. He competed in the NASCAR Winston Cup Series between 1969 and 1978.

== Career ==
Halford began his racing career at the age of 19, but by the time he began his NASCAR career in 1969 he was considered "old", at age 38. He earned one top ten finish in his career, in the 1972 Firecracker 400, while leading 16 laps out of 6924 - the equivalent of 7,723.0 miles (12,429.0 km). Halford's average starting position would be 24th while he would finish 21st on average. An attempt to qualify for the 1972 Miller High Life 500 would end up in failure. After the end of his career, Halford had earned $27,129 in total race earnings ($133,914.83 when adjusted for inflation).

In the 1981 ARCA 200 at Daytona International Speedway, Halford was involved in an eleven-car accident that left him with a neck injury.
