= 1972 NASCAR Grand National East Series =

1st season of the NASCAR Grand National East Series

Seasons
- ← none 1973 →

The 1972 NASCAR Grand National East Series was the 1st season of the series. The title was won by Neil Castles, making him the inaugural champion in the NASCAR Grand National East Series.

== Schedule and results ==
The 1972 season included 15 individual races, although Hickory Speedway hosted two races and Columbia Speedway hosted three races.

Date	Name	Racetrack	Location	Winner
March 14	Bold City 200	Speedway Park	Jacksonville, Florida	David Pearson
March 19	Hickory 276	Hickory Speedway	Hickory, North Carolina	Bobby Allison
April 1	Greenville 200	Greenville-Pickens Speedway	Greenville, South Carolina	Neil Castles
April 4	Columbia 200	Columbia Speedway	Cayce, South Carolina	Max Berrier
May 13	Mr. D's 200	Fairgrounds Speedway at Nashville	Nashville, Tennessee	Bobby Allison
May 14	Maryville 200	Smoky Mountain Raceway	Maryville, Tennessee	Neil Castles
May 21	Mountaineer 300	International Raceway Park	Ona, West Virginia	Bobby Allison
June 17	Fun Sun 200	Myrtle Beach Speedway	Myrtle Beach, South Carolina	Elmo Langley
July 11	Albany-Saratoga 250	Albany-Saratoga Speedway	Malta, New York	Bobby Isaac
July 14	Islip 300	Islip Speedway	Islip, New York	Bobby Isaac
July 28	Sandlapper 200	Columbia Speedway	Cayce, South Carolina	Buddy Baker
July 29	Buddy Shuman 300	Hickory Speedway	Hickory, North Carolina	Bobby Isaac
August 12	Myers Brothers Memorial 250	Bowman Gray Stadium	Winston-Salem, North Carolina	Max Berrier
August 13	Coalminers 100	Lonesome Pine Raceway	Coeburn, Virginia	Bobby Isaac
August 23	Gamecock 200	Columbia Speedway	Cayce, South Carolina	Bobby Allison

== Full Drivers' Championship ==
(key) Bold – Pole position awarded by time. Italics – Pole position set by owner's points. * – Most laps led.
Note: only the final points of the top 25 were recorded. Due to missing information, some finishes marked as not running may not be accurate - their final status is not definitively known.

Pos	Driver	JSP	HCY	GPS	CLB	NSV	SMR	ONA	MBS	AST	ISP	CLB	HCY	BGS	LPS	CLB	Pts
1	Neil Castles		4	1	2*	4	1	15	2*	2	2	6	6	10	2	2	1440.5
2	Elmo Langley		17	**2***	3	2	4	3	**1**	4	3	3	5	4	3	3	1433
3	Jimmy Vaughn	12	7	6	9	3	6	5	6	6	13	8	23	3	4	7	1393.25
4	Baxter Price		12	9	8	11	9	8	8	8	5	19	8	5	5	10	1362
5	Ernie Shaw	7		12	7	6	18	6	12	11	10	17	11	9	16	14	1252.5
6	Wayne Andrews	14	9	19	4	7	15	16	20			5	7	11	18	6	1015.5
7	Wendell Scott	4		10	12	23	12		10	17		24	17	17	9	8	875
8	E. J. Trivette					12	8	19	14	9	6	15	13	6	22		857.25
9	Richard Childress		14	24	20	5	22	DNQ	24	12	7	13		15	13	11	843.25
10	Tiny Lund	16	15	22	**16**	8	23	DNQ	7	5	20		Wth	13	10		722.25
11	Buck Baker	3	5	15	18	15	10	7	19						24		674.75
12	Jim Paschal		10	18		Wth		**2**	29			10	21	2	19	16	672.75
13	Bobby Fleming			13	17	17	28	13	13			22		14	12	19	629.25
14	Gary Myers		11			13	3	4	25			4	4				615
15	Rick Newsom							DNQ		23	8	16	15	8	17	13	568.25
16	Bobby Allison		**1***		6	**1***		1*		**14***	**14**	2	19		27	1	553.25
17	Frank Sessoms		6		5		7		23			12				4	528
18	Ed Negre		21		11		27	DNQ		15	17	27	10		14	21	521.5
19	Glenn Brewer	6		11	10	9	13	DNQ									435.5
20	Max Berrier			7	1	20		14						**1***			422
21	Pee Wee Wentz		16	16	22	DNQ	25	DNQ				9	22	18		22	383.5
22	H. B. Bailey		19			22	2	12	16								357.5
23	D. K. Ulrich					14	26	17	15	20	11	23	18	16	21	18	332.25
24	Jerry Hufflin									16	15	18			8		299.25
25	Charlie Blanton	**2**	18	5	14												271
	Bobby Isaac		2							1	1*		**1***		**1***	**12***	
	Frank Warren			21	13		19			22	21				29		
	Jabe Thomas							DNQ		25	19		14	19	26		
	Walter Ballard			29				DNQ				25	9	22	23		
	Bill Shirey			28	19		21		27							20	
	James Hylton	5		26						3	16						
	Tommy Lechlider					16		9	28	13							
	David Pearson	1*		3												15	
	Earl Brooks							DNQ	5			20			20		
	Bill Hollar	11						DNQ	18	18							
	Jimmy Hailey					21		10	17								
	David Ray Boggs			30				DNQ	9						15		
	Randy Bannister			8				DNQ				26	20				
	John Sears	13						DNQ	26					20			
	Joe Hollingsworth							DNQ				11		21	30		
	Howard Bowling					24	24	20									
	Cale Yarborough											7	2				
	Randy Hutchison							DNQ	3						7		
	Dave Marcis		3				**11***										
	Roy Hallquist									10	4						
	Clyde Harbour							11							6		
	Eddie Yarboro								11						11		
	Billy Hagan					10	14										
	Phil Spiak									7	18						
	Butch Lindley											21				5	
	Joe Childress											14	12				
	Bill Chevalier									21	9						
	J. D. McDuffie							DNQ						7	25		
	Don Haupt									24	12						
	Donnie Allison					18		18									
	Bob Williams	10		27													
	Phil Gibson			17	21												
	Stan Starr					25	16										
	Richard D. Brown		20										24				
	Ronnie Daniel		22	23													
	Ronnie Childress										22	28					
	Buddy Baker							DNQ				**1***					
	Benny Parsons												3				
	LeeRoy Yarbrough			4					QL	Wth							
	Sam Sommers								4								
	L. D. Ottinger						5										
	Mike Humphreys		8														
	Jimmy Lee Capps	8															
	Joe Dean Huss	9						DNQ									
	Marty Robbins															9	
	Hank Thomas													12			
	Roy Stamey		13														
	Gordon Birkett			14				DNQ									
	Bobby Wilson	15															
	Larry Miller				15												
	Harry Gant												16				
	Tootle Estes						17										
	Herb Kanaday	17															
	James Cox															17	
	Dick May					19											
	Les Covey							DNQ		19							
	Johnny Halford			20													
	Tommy Andrews						20										
	Dub Simpson								21								
	Tom Pistone								22								
	Cecil Gordon			25				DNQ									
	G. C. Spencer														28		
	Ed Mendenhall						29										
	Bill Seifert							DNQ	30								
	George Altheide														31		
	Bill Champion							DNQ									
	Charlie Glotzbach							DNQ									
	Junior Spencer							DNQ									
	Al Straub							DNQ									
	Raymond Wiliams							DNQ									
	Bugs Stevens									Wth							

== See also ==
- 1972 NASCAR Winston Cup Series
- 1972 NASCAR Winston West Series
