= 1978 American 500 =

Auto race held at North Carolina Motor Speedway in 1978

Race details
- Race 28 of 30 in the 1978 NASCAR Winston Cup Series season
- This is a program from the 1978 running of the American 500.
- Date: October 22, 1978
- Official name: American 500
- Location: North Carolina Motor Speedway, Rockingham, North Carolina
- Course: Permanent racing facility
- Course length: 1.636 km (1.017 miles)
- Distance: 492 laps, 500.4 mi (804.2 km)
- Weather: Warm with temperatures of 80.1 °F (26.7 °C) with wind speeds reaching of 8 miles per hour (13 km/h)
- Average speed: 117.288 miles per hour (188.757 km/h)
- Attendance: 46,000

Pole position
Driver	Cale Yarborough	Junior Johnson & Associates

Most laps led
Driver	Cale Yarborough	Junior Johnson & Associates
- Laps: 376

Winner
No. 11	Cale Yarborough	Junior Johnson & Associates

Television in the United States
- Network: untelevised
- Announcers: none

The 1978 American 500 was a NASCAR Winston Cup Series race that took place on October 22, 1978, at North Carolina Motor Speedway in Rockingham, North Carolina. Four hundred and ninety-two laps were done on a paved oval track spanning 1.017 miles (1.637 km). Forty-six thousand people would attend the race live to see 36 cars (and only 19 of them finish the race). Other notable drivers included: Darrell Waltrip (who went on to be a NASCAR announcer for FOX), Benny Parsons, Richard Petty, Richard Childress, and J.D. McDuffie (who would die at Watkins Glen during a racing event in the 1991 NASCAR Winston Cup Series season).

North Carolina Motor Speedway was affectionately referred to at the time as The Action Track; delivering much action from motorcycle racing to stock car events. The Baby Grand 125 was an ARCA (Automobile Racing Club of America) companion race that took place the previous day. People could buy the official program during both races at a relatively low price of $3 USD ($14.46 when adjusted for inflation).

== Race report ==
Cale Yarborough won the race's pole position and would eventually go onto leading 376 laps of the 492 that were actually done. Bobby Allison lost to Yarborough by more than two laps. Cale Yarborough automatically clinched his third straight NASCAR Winston Cup championship as a result of winning this race.

As a result of recent rule changes brought about by the implementation of an organized NASCAR playoffs system in the 21st century; this situation is no longer possible under the current NASCAR regime. Bobby Wawak drove Richard Childress Backup car in this race.

The racing entries were mostly made of Chevrolet vehicles with very few Ford and Dodge entries. Four hours, fifteen minutes, and fifty-eight seconds was the duration of the entire race. The first green flag was waved at noon while the checkered flag was waved at approximately 4:15 P.M.. Engine problems were dominant in the race with only Bill Hollar actually quitting the race for "personal reasons." Donnie Allison would become ill after leading 12 laps and would drop out of the race; no relief driver was ever found. Five cautions slowed the race for 52 laps and Baxter Price (in his Chevrolet Chevelle Laguna) was the lowest driver to actually finish the race.

Joe Frasson would finish his NASCAR Cup Series career by participating in this race and finishing in 23rd place after starting in 25th place (improving his position by two places). Charlie Blanton and Johnny Halford would also retire from NASCAR after this race. Frasson drove the race using a self-owned #18 vehicle with a 1978 Buick Century as his manufacturer and model. The number would be transferred over to a Chevrolet machine when it was transferred to Joe Gibbs Racing starting in the 1992 Daytona 500 and remains with JGR to the present day. The number in question would ultimately become synonymous with Kyle Busch's Toyota Camry starting in 2008. Top prize at this race would be $23,360 in American dollars ($112,616.65 when adjusted for inflation).

=== Qualifying ===
Grid	No.	Driver	Manufacturer
1	11	Cale Yarborough	Oldsmobile
2	1	Donnie Allison	Chevrolet
3	88	Darrell Waltrip	Chevrolet
4	15	Bobby Allison	Ford
5	54	Lennie Pond	Chevrolet
6	22	Ricky Rudd	Chevrolet
7	27	Buddy Baker	Chevrolet
8	90	Dick Brooks	Ford
9	5	Neil Bonnett	Chevrolet
10	2	Dave Marcis	Chevrolet
11	43	Richard Petty	Chevrolet
12	72	Benny Parsons	Chevrolet
13	48	James Hylton	Chevrolet
14	92	Dick May	Chevrolet
15	8	Ed Negre	Dodge

== Finishing order ==
Section reference:

1. Cale Yarborough†(No. 11)
2. Bobby Allison (No. 15)
3. Darrell Waltrip (No. 88)
4. Benny Parsons† (No. 72)
5. Dick Brooks† (No. 90)
6. Richard Petty (No. 43)
7. Lennie Pond (No. 54)
8. Dave Marcis (No. 2)
9. Buddy Arrington (No. 67)
10. Richard Childress (No. 3)
11. Dick May† (No. 92)
12. J.D. McDuffie† (No. 70)
13. Jimmy Means (No. 52)
14. James Hylton† (No. 48)
15. Cecil Gordon† (No. 24)
16. Frank Warren (No. 79)
17. Gary Myers (No. 4)
18. Tommy Gale† (No. 64)
19. Baxter Price (No. 45)
20. Donnie Allison* (No. 1)
21. Tighe Scott* (No. 30)
22. Buddy Baker*† (No. 27)
23. Joe Frasson*† (No. 18)
24. David Pearson* (No. 21)
25. Ricky Rudd* (No. 22)
26. Roger Hamby* (No. 17)
27. Bobby Wawak*† (No. 31)
28. Junior Miller* (No. 95)
29. Elmo Langley*† (No. 19)
30. Johnny Halford* (No. 87)
31. Neil Bonnett*† (No. 5)
32. Charlie Blanton* (No. 59)
33. Ronnie Thomas* (No. 25)
34. Ferrel Harris*† (No. 81)
35. Ed Negre* (No. 8)
36. Bill Hollar*† (No. 28)

† Driver is known to be deceased
* Driver failed to finish race

== Standings after the race ==
Pos	Driver	Points	Differential
1	Cale Yarborough	4519	0
2	Darrell Waltrip	4123	-396
3	Dave Marcis	4083	-436
4	Benny Parsons	4043	-476
5	Bobby Allison	4027	-492
6	Richard Petty	3708	-811
7	Lennie Pond	3593	-926
8	Dick Brooks	3504	-1015
9	Buddy Arrington	3453	-1066
10	Richard Childress	3363	-1156

Preceded by 1978 NAPA National 500	NASCAR Winston Cup Series Season; 1978	Succeeded by 1978 Dixie 500

Preceded by 1977	American 500 races 1969	Succeeded by 1979
