= IROC VII =

Motor car races held in 1979–1980

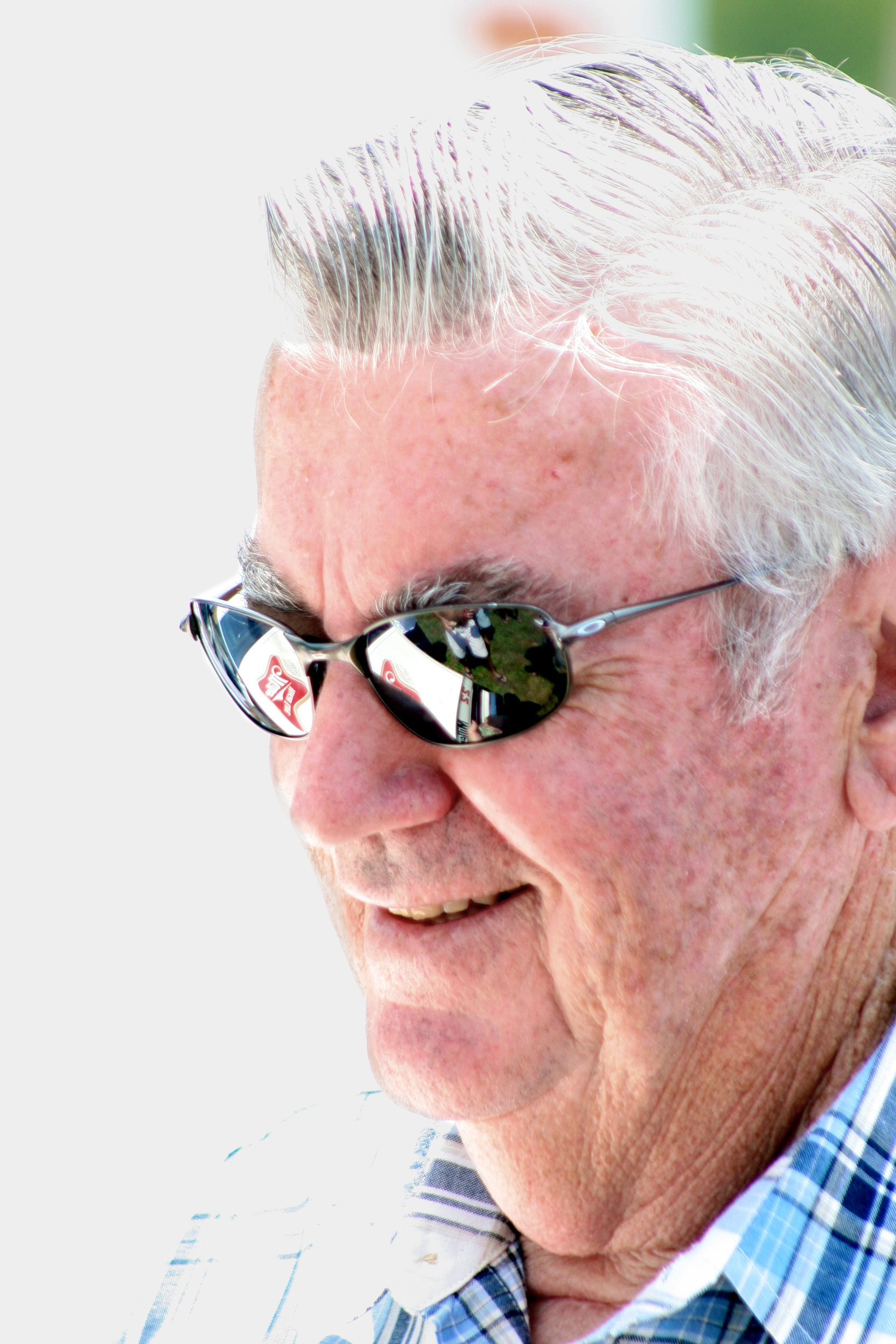
Bobby Allison (seen in 2007), the IROC VII champion

IROC VII was the seventh year of IROC competition, which took place in 1979 and 1980. The format carried over from IROC VI in that three qualifying races were held for participants from NASCAR (stock cars), CART (Indy cars), and Road Racing (which primarily consisted of Formula One, SCCA, and IMSA). The top four finishers in these qualifying races then earned the chance to race in the two final races at Riverside International Raceway and Atlanta Motor Speedway. It used the Chevrolet Camaro in all races, and this was the final year for the series before it went on hiatus until 1984. Bobby Allison won the oval finale en route to the championship and $75,000 .

== Standings ==
The final points standings were as follows:

| Rank | Driver | Points | Winnings | Series |
|---|---|---|---|---|
| 1 | (United States) Bobby Allison | 41 | $75,000 | NASCAR Winston Cup |
| 2 | (United States) Darrell Waltrip | 32 | $35,000 | NASCAR Winston Cup |
| 3 | (United States) Rick Mears | 31 | $22,000 | CART Indy Car Series |
| 4 | (United States) Gordon Johncock | 26 | $21,000 | CART Indy Car Series |
| 5 | (United States) Mario Andretti | 25 | $20,000 | Formula One |
| 6 | (United States) Johnny Rutherford | 24 | $19,000 | CART Indy Car Series |
| 7 | (United States) Neil Bonnett | 20 | $18,000 | NASCAR Winston Cup |
| 8 | (United States) Don Whittington | 15 | $17,000 | IMSA Camel GT |
| 9 | (United States) Bobby Unser | 14 | $15,500 | CART Indy Car Series |
| 10 | (United States) Buddy Baker | 14 | $15,500 | NASCAR Winston Cup |
| 11 | (United States) Peter Gregg | 11 | $15,000 | IMSA Camel GT |
| 12 | (Switzerland) Clay Regazzoni | 9 | $15,500 | Formula One |

== Race results ==
=== Qualifying Races ===
==== NASCAR Qualifying Race, Michigan International Speedway ====
1. Neil Bonnett
2. Bobby Allison
3. Darrell Waltrip
4. Buddy Baker
5. Cale Yarborough
6. Benny Parsons
7. Dale Earnhardt
8. Donnie Allison

==== CART Qualifying Race, Michigan International Speedway ====
1. Gordon Johncock
2. Bobby Unser
3. Rick Mears
4. Johnny Rutherford
5. Wally Dallenbach
6. Mike Mosley
7. Tom Sneva
8. Danny Ongais

==== Road Racing Qualifying Race, Riverside International Raceway ====
1. Mario Andretti
2. Peter Gregg
3. Don Whittington
4. Clay Regazzoni
5. Alan Jones
6. John Watson
7. Keke Rosberg
8. Emerson Fittipaldi

=== Final Races ===
==== Road Racing Final, Riverside International Raceway ====
1. Darrell Waltrip
2. Bobby Allison
3. Mario Andretti
4. Rick Mears
5. Gordon Johncock
6. Johnny Rutherford
7. Neil Bonnett
8. Buddy Baker
9. Bobby Unser
10. Clay Regazzoni
11. Peter Gregg
12. Don Whittington

==== Oval Final, Atlanta Motor Speedway ====
Darrell Waltrip started on the pole position, with Bobby Allison on the outside of the front row. As the field came across the start/finish line to complete lap 2, fourth place Mario Andretti triggered a huge pileup. Andretti clipped the back of Waltrip's car, who then collected Neil Bonnett into the outside wall. Andretti crashed to the inside wall, and a chain reaction wiped out almost the entire field. Leader Allison was ahead of the crash, and Rick Mears somehow escaped cleanly. Eight cars were involved, with seven too damaged to continue. After a 40 minute red flag, the race resumed with five cars left. On lap 41, Don Whittington got loose coming out of turn four and crashed on the mainstretch. It necessitated another red flag for cleanup.

Only three cars were left to race to the finish. Allison took the lead with two laps to go. Mears and Rutherford battled side-by-side for second, as Allison went on to win the race and clinch the title. Johncock was the only other car running, but 8 laps down due to damage sustained in the big crash.

At the end of the race nine of the twelve cars suffered significant damage. With eight of them badly wrecked, and no contract to continue the series, IROC would go on hiatus until 1984.

1. Bobby Allison, 66 laps
2. Rick Mears, 66 laps
3. Johnny Rutherford, 66 laps
4. Gordon Johncock, 58 laps
5. Don Whittington, 41 laps (crash)
6. Darrell Waltrip, 2 laps (crash)
7. Neil Bonnett, 2 laps (crash)
8. Mario Andretti, 2 laps (crash)
9. Buddy Baker, 2 laps (crash)
10. Bobby Unser, 2 laps (crash)
11. Peter Gregg, 2 laps (crash)
12. Clay Regazzoni, 2 laps (crash)
