= 1966 Nashville 400 =

Auto race held at Nashville Fairgrounds Speedway in 1966

Race details
- Race 36 of 49 in the 1966 NASCAR Grand National Series season
- Date: July 30, 1966
- Official name: Nashville 400
- Location: Fairgrounds Speedway, Nashville, Tennessee
- Course: Permanent racing facility
- Course length: 0.500 miles (0.804 km)
- Distance: 400 laps, 200.0 mi (321.8 km)
- Weather: Very hot with temperatures of 87.1 °F (30.6 °C); wind speeds of 14 miles per hour (23 km/h)
- Average speed: 71.770 mph (115.503 km/h)
- Attendance: 15,161

Pole position
Driver	Richard Petty	Petty Enterprises

Most laps led
Driver	Richard Petty	Petty Enterprises
- Laps: 400

Winner
No. 43	Richard Petty	Petty Enterprises

Television in the United States
- Network: untelevised
- Announcers: none

The 1966 Nashville 400 was a NASCAR Grand National Series event that was held on July 30, 1966, at Nashville Speedway in Nashville, Tennessee.

Out of Henley Gray's five career finishes in the top five and 60 finishes in the top ten, two of them came at Nashville Speedway.

== Background ==
Nashville Speedway was converted to a half-mile paved oval in 1957, when it began to be a NASCAR series track.

== Race report ==
It took two hours and forty-seven minutes to complete 400 laps on a paved track spanning 0.500 miles (0.805 km). Out of all of Richard Petty's 200 victories in Grand National/Winston Cup competition, arguably none were as dominant as this one. Richard Petty won the pole and led all 400 laps of the Nashville 400. While Petty had Jim Paschal to contend with right to the end during the 1964 NASCAR Grand National Series season, this event saw King Richard lap the field five times over. Buck Baker's finish in his Oldsmobile would be considered great since he qualified outside of the top ten. 15,161 spectators watched this race with four cautions being handed out by NASCAR for 41 laps.

Petty qualified for the pole position at a speed of 82.493 miles per hour (132.760 km/h) and also averaged 71.770 miles per hour (115.503 km/h) during the actual race.

The most notable crew chiefs that were involved in the event were Herman Beam, Bob Cooper, Clair Jackson, Frankie Scott, Dale Inman and Bud Hartje.

The racing grid was made up of 27 Americans and one Canadian (Don Biederman who finished the race in 19th place). Darel Dieringer received the last place finish for crashing his car at the beginning of the race. Jack Lawrence would crash his vehicle on lap 2 while Blackie Watt's vehicle suffered from a problematic radiator on lap 21. Doug Cooper fell out with engine failure on lap 49. J.D. McDuffie managed to overheat his vehicle on lap 54. Paul Lewis blew his vehicle's engine on lap 100 while Roy Tyner's vehicle had an oil leak on lap 141. J.T. Putney's engine would stop working altogether on lap 171. An oil leak would relegate Don Biederman to the sidelines on lap 214. Wayne Smith's engine stopped working on lap 220 while a loose frame took Elmo Langley out of the race on lap 250.

Driveshaft problems took Friday Hassler out of the race on lap 256. A problem with the vehicle's differential took Buddy Arrington out of the race on lap 262. An oil leak forced Joel Davis out of the race on lap 268 while a troublesome differential on G.C. Spencer's vehicle took him out of the race on lap 287. A faulty engine took Stick Elliott out of the race on lap 308. Meanwhile, the throttle on James Hylton's vehicle stopped working; causing Hylton to exit the race prematurely on lap 352.

Coo Coo Marlin was considered to be popular with the local racing supporters on the weekends when the NASCAR toured Nashville. He was considered the odds-on favorite to win the race even when he drove a one-year-old vehicle to the track. Unfortunately, he was only the 27th best driver to compete at Nashville Fairgrounds; with an average start of 11th place and an average finish of 13th place.

Marty Robbins participated in this race and was announced as "Columbia Records' recording star". He finished 25th due to an oil leak problem on lap 48. Marty Robbins' Cup debut marked the only time he ran in the series on a short track. The county singer fittingly hit the track here at Nashville but all the rest of his Cup starts would be on superspeedway ovals.

=== Qualifying ===
Grid	No.	Driver	Manufacturer	Owner
1	42	Richard Petty	'66 Plymouth	Petty Enterprises
2	2	Bobby Allison	'65 Chevrolet	Donald Brackins
3	49	G. C. Spencer	'65 Plymouth	G.C. Spencer
4	1	Paul Lewis	'65 Plymouth	Paul Lewis
5	02	Doug Cooper	'65 Plymouth	Bob Cooper
6	64	Elmo Langley	'64 Ford	Elmo Langley / Henry Woodfield
7	39	Friday Hassler	'66 Chevrolet	J.H. Crawford
8	97	Coo Coo Marlin	'66 Ford	Henley Gray
9	48	James Hylton	'65 Ford	Bud Hartje
10	24	Darel Dieringer	'66 Ford	Betty Lilly
11	19	J.T. Putney	'66 Chevrolet	J.T. Putney
12	06	Jack Lawrence	'64 Mercury	John McCarthy
13	87	Buck Baker	'66 Oldsmobile	Buck Baker
14	4	John Sears	'64 Ford	L.G. DeWitt
15	18	Stick Elliott	'66 Chevrolet	Toy Bolton
16	34	Wendell Scott	'65 Ford	Wendell Scott
17	53	Marty Robbins	'64 Ford	David Warren
18	88	Neil Castles	'66 Chevrolet	Buck Baker
19	74	Henley Gray	'66 Ford	Gene Black
20	20	Clyde Lynn	'64 Ford	Clyde Lynn

== Top 10 finishers ==
Pos	Grid	No.	Driver	Manufacturer	Laps	Winnings	Laps led	Time/Status
1	1	43	Richard Petty	Plymouth	400	$2,750	400	2:47:11
2	13	87	Buck Baker	Oldsmobile	395	$1,400	0	+5 laps
3	2	2	Bobby Allison	Chevrolet	394	$850	0	+6 laps
4	19	74	Henley Gray	Ford	383	$500	0	+17 laps
5	14	4	John Sears	Ford	383	$475	0	+17 laps
6	18	88	Neil Castles	Chevrolet	378	$450	0	+22 laps
7	20	20	Clyde Lynn	Ford	378	$425	0	+22 laps
8	8	97	Coo Coo Marlin	Ford	375	$375	0	+25 laps
9	16	34	Wendell Scott	Ford	375	$325	0	+25 laps
10	9	48	James Hylton	Ford	352	$300	0	Throttle problems

Preceded by 1966 Smoky Mountain 200	NASCAR Grand National Series season 1966	Succeeded by 1966 Dixie 400
