= 1968 Hickory 250 =

Auto race held at Hickory Motor Speedway in 1968

Race details
- Race 8 of 49 in the 1968 NASCAR Grand National Series season
- Date: April 7, 1968; 56 years ago
- Official name: Hickory 250
- Location: Hickory Speedway, Hickory, North Carolina
- Course: Permanent racing facility
- Course length: 0.644 km (0.400 miles)
- Distance: 250 laps, 100 mi (160 km)
- Weather: Chilly with temperatures of 66.9 °F (19.4 °C); wind speeds of 7.00 miles per hour (11.27 km/h)
- Average speed: 79.435 miles per hour (127.838 km/h)

Pole position
Driver	David Pearson	Holman Moody

Most laps led
Driver	Bobby Isaac	Nord Krauskopf
- Laps: 116

Winner
No. 43	Richard Petty	Petty Enterprises

The 1968 Hickory 250 was a NASCAR Grand National Series event that was held on April 7, 1968, at Hickory Speedway in Hickory, North Carolina.

== Background ==
Hickory Motor Speedway first opened in 1951 as a 1/2-mile (0.80 km) dirt track. Gwyn Staley won the first race at the speedway and later became the first track champion. Drivers such as Junior Johnson, Ned Jarrett, and Ralph Earnhardt also became track champions in the 1950s, with Earnhardt winning five of them.

In 1953, NASCAR's Grand National Series visited the track for the first time. Tim Flock won the first race at the speedway, which became a regular part of the Grand National schedule. After winning his track championship in 1952, Junior Johnson became the most successful Grand National driver at Hickory, winning there seven times.

The track has been re-configured three times in its history. The track became a 0.4-mile (644 meters) dirt track in 1955, which was paved for the first time during the 1967 season. In 1970, the Hickory track was shortened to a length of 0.363 miles (584 meters).

== Race report ==
The "250" portion of the event's name referred to the number of laps that were scheduled to be performed that day; the race lasted only 100 miles or 160 kilometres overall. It took one hour, fifteen minutes, and thirty-two seconds for the race to reach its conclusion; Richard Petty defeated David Pearson by 0.5 laps in front of ten thousand people; helping Petty to win his third Hickory Cup race in a row. Two cautions were waved for nineteen laps.

Total winnings for the race were $4,940 ($44,668 when adjusted for inflation); with the winner receiving $1,200 ($10,851 when adjusted for inflation). Most of the vehicles that raced in this event had the Ford Motor Company as their manufacturer. Notable speeds in this race were: 79.435 miles per hour (127.838 km/h) as the average speed achieved by David Pearson and 86.795 miles per hour (139.683 km/h) as the pole position speed.

Notable crew chiefs for the race were Harry Hyde, Dale Inman, Frankie Scott, Jake Elder, Tom Vandiver, and Ray Hicks.

For the race, the temperatures reached a maximum of 66.9 °F or 19.4 °C with wind speeds reaching 7.00 miles per hour or 11.27 kilometres per hour, providing a relatively chilly but pleasant climate for the drivers and for the fans. Precipitation was relatively absent during the day of the race, although rain and/or melted snow was reported at the nearest airport on that day. For people who were driving to the race track that day, visibility on the road was a vivid 9.1 miles or 14.6 kilometres.

The transition to purpose-built racecars began in the early 1960s and occurred gradually over that decade. Changes made to the sport by the late 1960s brought an end to the "strictly stock" vehicles of the 1950s.

=== Qualifying ===
Grid	No.	Driver	Manufacturer	Owner
1	17	David Pearson	'68 Ford	Holman-Moody
2	0	Jack Ingram	'66 Chevrolet	Tommy Ingram
3	71	Bobby Isaac	'67 Dodge	Nord Krauskopf
4	43	Richard Petty	'67 Plymouth	Petty Enterprises
5	49	G.C. Spencer	'67 Plymouth	G.C. Spencer
6	39	Friday Hassler	'67 Chevrolet	Red Sharp
7	48	James Hylton	'67 Dodge	James Hylton
8	64	Elmo Langley	'66 Ford	Elmo Langley / Henry Woodfield
9	06	Neil Castles	'67 Plymouth	Neil Castles
10	4	John Sears	'66 Ford	L.G. DeWitt

== Finishing order ==
Section reference:

1. Richard Petty
2. David Pearson†
3. Bobby Isaac†
4. Friday Hassler†
5. James Hylton*
6. John Sears†
7. Jack Ingram
8. Roy Tyner†
9. Bill Seifert
10. Elmo Langley†
11. Clyde Lynn†
12. Henley Gray
13. G.C. Spencer*†
14. Jabe Thomas†
15. Neil Castles*
16. Buck Baker*†
17. Wayne Smith*
18. Bob Cooper*
19. Wendell Scott*†
20. Paul Dean Holt*
21. Bill Vanderhoff*
22. Jim Vandiver*†

* Driver failed to finish race
† signifies that the driver is known to be deceased

== Timeline ==
Section reference:

- Start of race: David Pearson takes over the lead from Richard Petty.
- Lap 5: Jim Vandiver developed terminal problems with his driveshaft, forcing him off the track.
- Lap 9: Bobby Isaac takes over the lead from David Pearson.
- Lap 31: The coils on Bill Vanderhoff's vehicle became problematic, ending his weekend on the track.
- Lap 99: Bob Cooper's vehicle overheated; ending his day on the track.
- Lap 115: Buck Baker's engine developed problems, causing him to withdraw from the event.
- Lap 122: Neil Castles' engine became problematic, forcing him to exit the race.
- Lap 125: Richard Petty takes over the lead from Bobby Isaac.
- Lap 136: David Pearson takes over the lead from Richard Petty.
- Lap 187: Richard Petty takes over the lead from David Pearson.
- Lap 222: The differential on G.C. Spencer's vehicle stopped working properly, forcing him to leave the race.
- Lap 244: James Hylton's engine became problematic; forcing him to exit the race.
- Finish: Richard Petty was officially declared the winner of the event.

Preceded by 1968 Atlanta 500	NASCAR Grand National Season; 1968	Succeeded by 1968 Greenville 200

Preceded by 1968 untitled race at Montgomery Speedway	Richard Petty's Career Wins; 1960-1984	Succeeded by 1968 Greenville 200
