= Speedway Park =

Former NASCAR race track

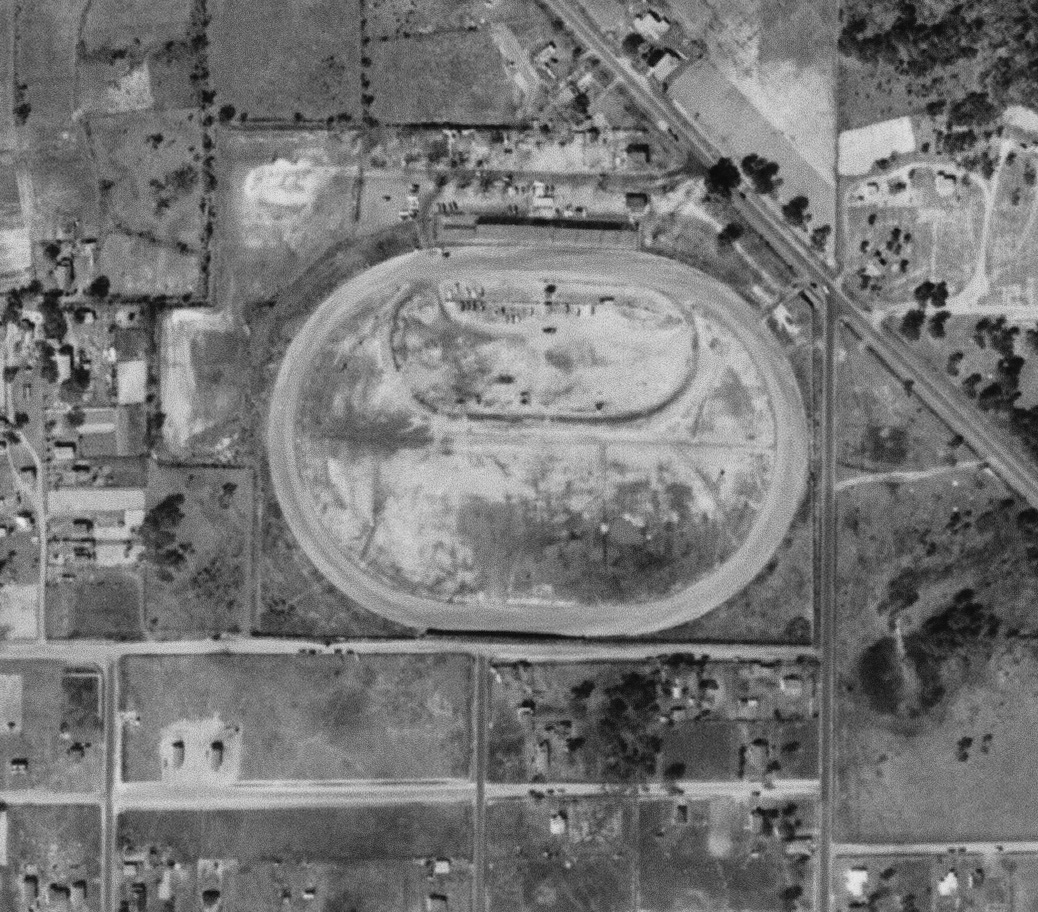
- Aerial photograph of Speedway Park (1952)
- Location: Jacksonville, Florida, U.S.
- Coordinates: 30.301316°N 81.745083°W
- Capacity: ~5,000
- Opened: 1947
- Closed: 1973
- Major events: None (defunct)

Dirt oval track
- Length: 0.500 mi (0.805 km)

Speedway Park was a 0.5-mile (0.80 km) dirt, oval, auto racing track, located in Jacksonville, Florida.

It was built in 1946 by Eddie Bland on land belonging to the family farm and later came to be known as Jacksonville Speedway after it was sold in 1954.

Opened in 1947, the track was located at the intersection of Lenox Avenue and Plymouth Street in southwest Jacksonville. NASCAR Grand National Series races were held at the track during the 1951, 1952, 1954, 1955, 1961 and 1964 seasons. The final Grand National Series race at the track was won by Wendell Scott, the first African-American to win in NASCAR's top series.

In addition to auto racing, the track hosted the Duval County Exposition. The NASCAR Grand American Series also competed there. After a final NASCAR Grand National East Series race in 1972 won by David Pearson, the track was closed in 1973; a housing development now stands at the site.

== Race results ==
Date	Series	Driver	Make	Laps	Avg. Speed
November 4, 1951	NASCAR Grand National Series	Herb Thomas	Hudson	200	53.412 mph (85.958 km/h)
March 3, 1952	NASCAR Grand National Series	Marshall Teague	Hudson	200	55.197 mph (88.831 km/h)
March 7, 1954	NASCAR Grand National Series	Herb Thomas	Hudson	200	56.461 mph (90.865 km/h)
February 13, 1955	NASCAR Grand National Series	Lee Petty	Chrysler	200	69.031 mph (111.095 km/h)
November 20, 1960	NASCAR Grand National Series	Lee Petty	Plymouth	200	64.400 mph (103.642 km/h)
December 1, 1963	NASCAR Grand National Series	Wendell Scott	Chevrolet	202	58.252 mph (93.748 km/h)
March 14, 1972	NASCAR Grand National East Series	David Pearson	Chevrolet	202	54.758 mph (88.124 km/h)
