= Neil Castles =

American race car driver (1934–2022)

- Born: Henry Neil Castles; October 1, 1934; Charlotte, North Carolina, U.S.
- Died: August 4, 2022 (aged 87)
- Achievements: 1972 NASCAR Grand National East Series Champion

NASCAR Cup Series career
- 498 races run over 19 years
- Best finish: 4th (1969)
- First race: 1957 Race 24 (Columbia)
- Last race: 1976 Mason-Dixon 500 (Dover)
| Wins | Top tens | Poles |
|---|---|---|
| 0 | 178 | 0 |

NASCAR Grand National East Series career
- 28 races run over 2 years
- Best finish: 1st (1972)
- First race: 1972 Hickory 276 (Hickory)
- Last race: 1973 Buddy Shuman 100 (Hickory)
- First win: 1972 Greenville 200 (Greenville)
- Last win: 1972 Maryville 200 (Maryville)
| Wins | Top tens | Poles |
|---|---|---|
| 2 | 20 | 0 |
- Statistics up to date as of April 28, 2026.

Henry Neil Castles (October 1, 1934 – August 4, 2022) was an American NASCAR Grand National and Winston Cup Series driver. He raced from 1957 to 1976 and won the NASCAR Grand National East Series championship in 1972.

== Early life ==
Castles was born in Marion, North Carolina, on October 1, 1934. He was raised in nearby Charlotte. When he was nine, he was gifted a car to drive at a soapbox derby racer by Buddy Shuman, who also gave Castles the nickname "Soapy". As a teenager, Castles worked on Shuman's cars and cleaned his tools at the latter's shop.

== Career ==
Castles made his NASCAR Cup Series debut in June 1957 at Columbia Speedway, running 51 laps before engine failure forced him to record a Did Not Finish (DNF). He went on to win 25-lap qualifying races at Darlington Raceway (1967) and Rockingham Speedway (1969). Three years later, he won the NASCAR Grand National East Series, a second-level series beneath the Winston Cup Series, which would ultimately prove to be his most successful NASCAR campaign. He also won at the Greenville-Pickens Speedway in the spring of 1972. Even though he failed to win a Winston Cup race in his nineteen-year career, Castles managed to record 51 finishes in the top-five and 178 finishes in the top-ten. Out of 90,509 laps, Castles led 70 of them. His total mileage in his career was 65,412.8 miles (105,271.7 km).

There was a short story about Castles in American Zoom, a book authored by Peter Golenbock. Castles was an also-ran of the old days who once found himself having an uncharacteristically good day. He had lapped Curtis Turner, but the flagman apparently did not believe it, as he kept giving Castles the move-over flag to let Turner pass. As Castles told the story: "The starter kept doing this, and I was getting real mad, so I just picked up my gun and when I come by the stand the next time I took aim and shot that flag out of his hand."

By the end of his racing career, Castles managed to earn $276,854 in total winnings ($1,566,410.79 when adjusted for inflation). At the time of his death, his 498 starts in the NASCAR Cup Series were the third-most by a driver who did not have a victory, behind J. D. McDuffie (653) and Buddy Arrington (560).

Castles also worked in the film industry as a stunt driver, beginning in the 1950s about the time that he started racing. After he and his friends were recruited as extras for filming at the Occoneechee Speedway, he volunteered to replace the stuntman who was stuck in California. He later featured in that capacity in Thunder Road (1958), Speedway (1968, doubling for Elvis Presley), The Last American Hero (1973), Greased Lightning (1977), and Six Pack (1982). He also acted in The Night of the Cat (1973) and Challenge (1974).

In 2019, Castles published a memoir of his life in NASCAR and in the film industry.

== Personal life ==
Castles was married to Iris Jean Gallion for 63 years until her death in December 2019. Together, they had three children.

Castles died on August 4, 2022, at the age of 87.
