= NASCAR Grand National East Series =

Former NASCAR series

- Category: Stock cars
- Country: United States
- Region: East Coast
- Inaugural season: 1972
- Folded: 1973
- Last Drivers' champion: Tiny Lund

The NASCAR Grand National East Series was a short-lived racing series created by NASCAR in 1972 to provide a second series, below the Winston Cup Series, at tracks that had been removed from the former Grand National Series' schedule upon Winston's assumption of the series sponsorship in 1971. The series only lasted for two seasons.

== History ==
The Grand National East Series was created in 1972 by NASCAR as a reaction to the contraction of the Grand National Division (renamed the Winston Cup Series) schedule and in response to the desires of new series sponsor Winston. The previous 50-to-60-race schedules were considered too large, and therefore the schedule was trimmed to approximately thirty races. This left many tracks that had previously hosted NASCAR's premier series without their headliner events; however, NASCAR created the Grand National East Division to fill the gap.

A similar Grand National West, then Winston West Series, was also formed from the former Pacific Coast Late Model Division and would continue to the present as the ARCA Menards Series West. However, the first version of a Grand National East Series would only last two seasons before being abandoned by NASCAR.

Eventually, NASCAR developed the NASCAR North Tour by the 1980s before abandoning it for the Busch Grand National North Series in 1987, which in 2003 became the Busch East Series when the rules for the West and North (renamed East as the tour began traveling to the Southeast) series were unified. Today, the series is known as the ARCA Menards Series East.

== Competition ==
The Grand National East Series used a mixture of former Grand National/Winston Cup cars, as well as cars from NASCAR's Grand American series, which had also folded after its 1971 season. The cars raced in the series were allowed to be up to four years old. A significant number of events in the series' 1973 season took place outside NASCAR's traditional southeastern stronghold. In addition, eight of the season's fifteen races were co-sanctioned with the Automobile Racing Club of America. Over the series' two seasons, the majority of winners of its events were Winston Cup Series regulars. Neil "Soapy" Castles won the 1972 Grand National East Series championship, winning two of the series' 15 races. Tiny Lund was the 1973 champion of the series, scoring five wins in 15 events.
