= 1995 Goodwrench 500 =

Second race of the 1995 NASCAR Winston Cup Series

Race details
- Race 2 of 31 in the 1995 NASCAR Winston Cup Series
- The 1995 Goodwrench 500 program cover, featuring Dale Earnhardt.
- Date: February 26, 1995
- Official name: 30th Annual Goodwrench 500
- Location: Rockingham, North Carolina, North Carolina Speedway
- Course: Permanent racing facility
- Course length: 1.017 miles (1.637 km)
- Distance: 492 laps, 500.364 mi (805.257 km)
- Average speed: 125.305 miles per hour (201.659 km/h)
- Attendance: 59,000

Pole position
Driver	Jeff Gordon	Hendrick Motorsports
- Time: 23.228

Most laps led
Driver	Jeff Gordon	Hendrick Motorsports
- Laps: 329

Winner
No. 24	Jeff Gordon	Hendrick Motorsports

Television in the United States
- Network: TNN
- Announcers: Mike Joy, Buddy Baker, Dick Berggren

Radio in the United States
- Radio: Motor Racing Network

The 1995 Goodwrench 500 was the second stock car race of the 1995 NASCAR Winston Cup Series and the 30th iteration of the event. The race was held on Sunday, February 26, 1995, in Rockingham, North Carolina, at North Carolina Motor Speedway, a 1.017 miles (1.637 km) permanent high-banked racetrack. The race took the scheduled 492 laps to complete. At race's end, Hendrick Motorsports driver Jeff Gordon would manage to dominate a majority of the race to take his third career NASCAR Winston Cup Series victory and his first victory of the season. To fill out the top three, Joe Gibbs Racing driver Bobby Labonte and Richard Childress Racing driver Dale Earnhardt would finish second and third, respectively.

== Background ==
The layout of North Carolina Speedway, the venue where the race was held.

North Carolina Speedway was opened as a flat, one-mile oval on October 31, 1965. In 1969, the track was extensively reconfigured to a high-banked, D-shaped oval just over one mile in length. In 1997, North Carolina Motor Speedway merged with Penske Motorsports, and was renamed North Carolina Speedway. Shortly thereafter, the infield was reconfigured, and competition on the infield road course, mostly by the SCCA, was discontinued. Currently, the track is home to the Fast Track High Performance Driving School.

=== Entry list ===
- (R) denotes rookie driver.

#	Driver	Team	Make
1	Rick Mast	Precision Products Racing	Pontiac
2	Rusty Wallace	Penske Racing South	Ford
3	Dale Earnhardt	Richard Childress Racing	Chevrolet
4	Sterling Marlin	Morgan–McClure Motorsports	Chevrolet
5	Terry Labonte	Hendrick Motorsports	Chevrolet
6	Mark Martin	Roush Racing	Ford
7	Geoff Bodine	Geoff Bodine Racing	Ford
8	Jeff Burton	Stavola Brothers Racing	Ford
9	Lake Speed	Melling Racing	Ford
10	Ricky Rudd	Rudd Performance Motorsports	Ford
11	Brett Bodine	Brett Bodine Racing	Ford
12	Derrike Cope	Bobby Allison Motorsports	Ford
15	Dick Trickle	Bud Moore Engineering	Ford
16	Ted Musgrave	Roush Racing	Ford
17	Darrell Waltrip	Darrell Waltrip Motorsports	Chevrolet
18	Bobby Labonte	Joe Gibbs Racing	Chevrolet
19	Phil Parsons	TriStar Motorsports	Ford
21	Morgan Shepherd	Wood Brothers Racing	Ford
22	Randy LaJoie (R)	Bill Davis Racing	Pontiac
23	Jimmy Spencer	Haas-Carter Motorsports	Ford
24	Jeff Gordon	Hendrick Motorsports	Chevrolet
25	Ken Schrader	Hendrick Motorsports	Chevrolet
26	Steve Kinser	King Racing	Ford
27	Loy Allen Jr.	Junior Johnson & Associates	Ford
28	Dale Jarrett	Robert Yates Racing	Ford
29	Steve Grissom	Diamond Ridge Motorsports	Chevrolet
30	Michael Waltrip	Bahari Racing	Pontiac
31	Ward Burton	A.G. Dillard Motorsports	Chevrolet
32	Jimmy Hensley	Active Motorsports	Chevrolet
33	Robert Pressley (R)	Leo Jackson Motorsports	Chevrolet
37	John Andretti	Kranefuss-Haas Racing	Ford
40	Greg Sacks	Dick Brooks Racing	Pontiac
41	Ricky Craven (R)	Larry Hedrick Motorsports	Chevrolet
42	Kyle Petty	Team SABCO	Pontiac
43	Bobby Hamilton	Petty Enterprises	Pontiac
47	Billy Standridge	Standridge Motorsports	Ford
48	James Hylton	Hylton Motorsports	Pontiac
52	Gary Bradberry	Jimmy Means Racing	Ford
66	Ben Hess	RaDiUs Motorsports	Ford
71	Dave Marcis	Marcis Auto Racing	Chevrolet
75	Todd Bodine	Butch Mock Motorsports	Ford
77	Davy Jones (R)	Jasper Motorsports	Ford
81	Kenny Wallace	FILMAR Racing	Ford
87	Joe Nemechek	NEMCO Motorsports	Chevrolet
90	Mike Wallace	Donlavey Racing	Ford
94	Bill Elliott	Elliott-Hardy Racing	Ford
98	Jeremy Mayfield	Cale Yarborough Motorsports	Ford

== Qualifying ==
Qualifying was split into two rounds. The first round was held on Friday, February 24, at 2:00 PM EST. Each driver would have one lap to set a time. During the first round, the top 20 drivers in the round would be guaranteed a starting spot in the race. If a driver was not able to guarantee a spot in the first round, they had the option to scrub their time from the first round and try and run a faster lap time in a second round qualifying run, held on Saturday, February 25, at 11:30 AM EST. As with the first round, each driver would have one lap to set a time. For this specific race, positions 21-38 would be decided on time, and depending on who needed it, a select amount of positions were given to cars who had not otherwise qualified but were high enough in owner's points; up to four provisionals were given. If needed, a past champion who did not qualify on either time or provisionals could use a champion's provisional, adding one more spot to the field.

Jeff Gordon, driving for Hendrick Motorsports, won the pole, setting a time of 23.228 and an average speed of 157.620 mph (253.665 km/h) in the first round.

Five drivers would fail to qualify.

=== Full qualifying results ===
Pos.	#	Driver	Team	Make	Time	Speed
1	24	Jeff Gordon	Hendrick Motorsports	Chevrolet	23.228	157.620
2	10	Ricky Rudd	Rudd Performance Motorsports	Ford	23.312	157.052
3	11	Brett Bodine	Junior Johnson & Associates	Ford	23.444	156.168
4	7	Geoff Bodine	Geoff Bodine Racing	Ford	23.454	156.101
5	25	Ken Schrader	Hendrick Motorsports	Chevrolet	23.520	155.663
6	12	Derrike Cope	Bobby Allison Motorsports	Ford	23.528	155.610
7	37	John Andretti	Kranefuss-Haas Racing	Ford	23.554	155.439
8	41	Ricky Craven (R)	Larry Hedrick Motorsports	Chevrolet	23.604	155.109
9	1	Rick Mast	Precision Products Racing	Ford	23.613	155.050
10	75	Todd Bodine	Butch Mock Motorsports	Ford	23.630	154.939
11	30	Michael Waltrip	Bahari Racing	Pontiac	23.643	154.853
12	21	Morgan Shepherd	Wood Brothers Racing	Ford	23.652	154.795
13	87	Joe Nemechek	NEMCO Motorsports	Chevrolet	23.653	154.788
14	15	Dick Trickle	Bud Moore Engineering	Ford	23.665	154.709
15	18	Bobby Labonte	Joe Gibbs Racing	Chevrolet	23.678	154.625
16	2	Rusty Wallace	Penske Racing South	Ford	23.683	154.592
17	43	Bobby Hamilton	Petty Enterprises	Pontiac	23.694	154.520
18	8	Jeff Burton	Stavola Brothers Racing	Ford	23.695	154.514
19	6	Mark Martin	Roush Racing	Ford	23.696	154.507
20	22	Randy LaJoie (R)	Bill Davis Racing	Pontiac	23.739	154.227
Failed to lock in Round 1
21	29	Steve Grissom	Diamond Ridge Motorsports	Chevrolet	23.552	155.452
22	4	Sterling Marlin	Morgan–McClure Motorsports	Chevrolet	23.648	154.821
23	3	Dale Earnhardt	Richard Childress Racing	Chevrolet	23.740	154.221
24	94	Bill Elliott	Elliott-Hardy Racing	Ford	23.746	154.182
25	16	Ted Musgrave	Roush Racing	Ford	23.772	154.013
26	28	Dale Jarrett	Robert Yates Racing	Ford	23.776	153.987
27	42	Kyle Petty	Team SABCO	Pontiac	23.776	153.987
28	23	Jimmy Spencer	Travis Carter Enterprises	Ford	23.785	153.929
29	81	Kenny Wallace	FILMAR Racing	Ford	23.821	153.696
30	5	Terry Labonte	Hendrick Motorsports	Chevrolet	23.823	153.683
31	90	Mike Wallace	Donlavey Racing	Ford	23.826	153.664
32	32	Jimmy Hensley	Active Motorsports	Chevrolet	23.851	153.503
33	9	Lake Speed	Melling Racing	Ford	23.866	153.407
34	98	Jeremy Mayfield	Cale Yarborough Motorsports	Ford	23.886	153.278
35	40	Greg Sacks	Dick Brooks Racing	Pontiac	23.940	152.932
36	77	Davy Jones (R)	Jasper Motorsports	Ford	23.953	152.849
37	17	Darrell Waltrip	Darrell Waltrip Motorsports	Chevrolet	23.959	152.811
38	33	Robert Pressley (R)	Leo Jackson Motorsports	Chevrolet	24.031	152.353
Provisionals
39	26	Steve Kinser	King Racing	Ford	-*	-*
40	27	Loy Allen Jr.	Junior Johnson & Associates	Ford	-*	-*
41	31	Ward Burton	A.G. Dillard Motorsports	Chevrolet	-*	-*
42	71	Dave Marcis	Marcis Auto Racing	Chevrolet	-*	-*
Failed to qualify
43	66	Ben Hess	RaDiUs Motorsports	Ford	-*	-*
44	52	Gary Bradberry	Jimmy Means Racing	Ford	-*	-*
45	48	James Hylton	Hylton Motorsports	Pontiac	-*	-*
46	47	Billy Standridge	Johnson Standridge Racing	Ford	-*	-*
47	19	Phil Parsons	TriStar Motorsports	Ford	-*	-*
Official first round qualifying results
Official starting lineup

== Race results ==
Fin	St	#	Driver	Team	Make	Laps	Led	Status	Pts	Winnings
1	1	24	Jeff Gordon	Hendrick Motorsports	Chevrolet	492	329	running	185	$167,600
2	15	18	Bobby Labonte	Joe Gibbs Racing	Chevrolet	492	62	running	175	$61,350
3	23	3	Dale Earnhardt	Richard Childress Racing	Chevrolet	492	72	running	170	$40,740
4	2	10	Ricky Rudd	Rudd Performance Motorsports	Ford	492	3	running	165	$33,480
5	26	28	Dale Jarrett	Robert Yates Racing	Ford	491	0	running	155	$34,075
6	21	29	Steve Grissom	Diamond Ridge Motorsports	Chevrolet	491	0	running	150	$20,300
7	19	6	Mark Martin	Roush Racing	Ford	490	0	running	146	$28,325
8	6	12	Derrike Cope	Bobby Allison Motorsports	Ford	489	0	running	142	$18,425
9	41	31	Ward Burton	A.G. Dillard Motorsports	Chevrolet	489	0	running	138	$15,725
10	27	42	Kyle Petty	Team SABCO	Pontiac	489	0	running	134	$26,250
11	24	94	Bill Elliott	Elliott-Hardy Racing	Ford	489	0	running	130	$13,025
12	22	4	Sterling Marlin	Morgan–McClure Motorsports	Chevrolet	488	0	running	127	$25,775
13	7	37	John Andretti	Kranefuss-Haas Racing	Ford	488	0	running	124	$12,525
14	3	11	Brett Bodine	Junior Johnson & Associates	Ford	487	0	running	121	$25,425
15	31	90	Mike Wallace	Donlavey Racing	Ford	486	0	running	118	$12,625
16	8	41	Ricky Craven (R)	Larry Hedrick Motorsports	Chevrolet	486	0	running	115	$17,225
17	11	30	Michael Waltrip	Bahari Racing	Pontiac	485	0	running	112	$20,925
18	34	98	Jeremy Mayfield	Cale Yarborough Motorsports	Ford	483	0	running	109	$11,525
19	18	8	Jeff Burton	Stavola Brothers Racing	Ford	483	0	running	106	$21,275
20	29	81	Kenny Wallace	FILMAR Racing	Ford	477	0	running	103	$12,375
21	4	7	Geoff Bodine	Geoff Bodine Racing	Ford	474	0	running	100	$25,475
22	14	15	Dick Trickle	Bud Moore Engineering	Ford	471	0	running	97	$19,775
23	42	71	Dave Marcis	Marcis Auto Racing	Chevrolet	462	0	running	94	$10,625
24	16	2	Rusty Wallace	Penske Racing South	Ford	451	0	engine	91	$25,725
25	20	22	Randy LaJoie (R)	Bill Davis Racing	Pontiac	438	0	running	88	$19,925
26	30	5	Terry Labonte	Hendrick Motorsports	Chevrolet	436	5	running	90	$30,115
27	39	26	Steve Kinser	King Racing	Ford	436	0	running	82	$18,915
28	40	27	Loy Allen Jr.	Junior Johnson & Associates	Ford	433	0	running	79	$18,165
29	13	87	Joe Nemechek	NEMCO Motorsports	Chevrolet	417	0	engine	76	$9,990
30	28	23	Jimmy Spencer	Travis Carter Enterprises	Ford	417	0	running	73	$13,540
31	10	75	Todd Bodine	Butch Mock Motorsports	Ford	415	0	running	70	$18,240
32	33	9	Lake Speed	Melling Racing	Ford	376	0	running	67	$9,690
33	25	16	Ted Musgrave	Roush Racing	Ford	364	0	running	64	$17,940
34	12	21	Morgan Shepherd	Wood Brothers Racing	Ford	298	7	engine	66	$17,790
35	9	1	Rick Mast	Precision Products Racing	Ford	264	0	handling	58	$17,590
36	17	43	Bobby Hamilton	Petty Enterprises	Pontiac	259	0	engine	55	$9,315
37	36	77	Davy Jones (R)	Jasper Motorsports	Ford	222	0	crash	52	$9,275
38	37	17	Darrell Waltrip	Darrell Waltrip Motorsports	Chevrolet	219	0	engine	49	$17,305
39	5	25	Ken Schrader	Hendrick Motorsports	Chevrolet	217	14	crash	51	$17,205
40	32	32	Jimmy Hensley	Active Motorsports	Chevrolet	177	0	crash	43	$9,205
41	35	40	Greg Sacks	Dick Brooks Racing	Pontiac	177	0	crash	40	$18,205
42	38	33	Robert Pressley (R)	Leo Jackson Motorsports	Chevrolet	38	0	engine	37	$17,205
Official race results

Previous race: 1995 Daytona 500	NASCAR Winston Cup Series; 1995 season	Next race: 1995 Pontiac Excitement 400
