= 1969 Pickens 200 =

Auto race held at Greenville-Pickens Speedway in 1969

Race details
- Race 26 of 54 in the 1969 NASCAR Grand National Series season
- Date: June 21, 1969
- Official name: Pickens 200
- Location: Greenville-Pickens Speedway (Greenville, South Carolina)
- Course: Dirt oval
- Course length: 0.500 miles (0.805 km)
- Distance: 200 laps, 100.000 mi (160.934 km)
- Weather: Very hot with temperatures of 89.1 °F (31.7 °C); wind speeds of 11.1 miles per hour (17.9 km/h)
- Average speed: 61.813 mph (99.478 km/h)
- Attendance: 9,300

Pole position
Driver	Bobby Isaac	Nord Krauskopf

Most laps led
Driver	Bobby Isaac	Nord Krauskopf
- Laps: 197

Winner
No. 71	Bobby Isaac	Nord Krauskopf

The 1969 Pickens 200 was a NASCAR Grand National Series event that was held on June 21, 1969, at Greenville-Pickens Speedway in Greenville, South Carolina.

The transition to purpose-built racecars began in the early 1960s and occurred gradually over that decade. Changes made to the sport by the late 1960s brought an end to the "strictly stock" vehicles of the 1950s.

== Race report ==
25 drivers competed in this 200-lap racing event that took more than one hour and thirty minutes to successfully complete. Paul Dean Holt was credited with the last-place finish due to an engine problem on the first regulation lap of racing. Bobby Isaac would defeat David Pearson by nine seconds. Isaac, Pearson, and Richard Petty would be the only drivers on the lead lap by the end of the event after dominating the entire race.

James Hylton would compete directly against Nord Krauskopf as a NASCAR team owner for supremacy; Krauskopf's 1969 Dodge vehicle would prove to be superior to Hylton's 1967 Plymouth vehicle. The model year of the vehicles varied from 1967 to 1969 in compliance with NASCAR's regulations of that era. Cecil Gordon quit the race on lap 123 due to personal issues. Other notable drivers to appear at this race included: Neil Castles, J.D. McDuffie, Elmo Langley, Wendell Scott, and Bill Champion. Buster Sexton was black flagged during this race and was eventually disqualified on the ninth lap of the race.

Individual winnings for this race varied from a meager $200 ($1,715 when adjusted for inflation) to an incredible $1,000 ($8,574 when adjusted for inflation). The total prize purse for this racing event was $6,795 ($58,263 when adjusted for inflation).

Notable crew chiefs that witnessed the race were John Hill, Dick Hutcherson, Dale Inman and Harry Hyde. These individuals helped provide pit road services for John Sears, David Pearson, Richard Petty and Bobby Isaac.

=== Qualifying ===
Grid	No.	Driver	Manufacturer	Owner
1	71	Bobby Isaac	'69 Dodge	Nord Krauskopf
2	43	Richard Petty	'69 Ford	Petty Enterprises
3	4	John Sears	'68 Ford	L.G. DeWitt
4	18	Dick Johnson	'68 Ford	Dick Johnson
5	06	Neil Castles	'67 Plymouth	Neil Castles
6	64	Elmo Langley	'68 Ford	Elmo Langley
7	70	J.D. McDuffie	'67 Buick	J.D. McDuffie
8	0	Dick Poling	'67 Chevrolet	Don Tarr
9	10	Bill Champion	'68 Ford	Bill Champion
10	26	Earl Brooks	'67 Ford	Earl Brooks
11	08	E.J. Trivette	'69 Chevrolet	E.C. Reid
12	25	Jabe Thomas	'68 Plymouth	Don Robertson
13	04	Ken Meisenhelder	'67 Oldsmobile	Ken Meisenhelder
14	34	Wendell Scott	'68 Ford	Wendell Scott
15	76	Ben Arnold	'68 Ford	Don Culpepper
16	47	Cecil Gordon	'68 Ford	Bill Seifert
17	19	Henley Gray	'68 Ford	Harry Melton
18	80	Wayne Gillette	'67 Chevrolet	E.C. Reid
19	12	Pete Hazelwood	'67 Ford	Pete Hazelwood
20	17	David Pearson	'69 Ford	Holman-Moody Racing
21	48	James Hylton	'68 Dodge	James Hylton
22	82	Buster Sexton	'67 Chevrolet	Mack Sellers
23	45	Bill Seifert	'69 Ford	Bill Seifert
24	23	Paul Dean Holt	'67 Ford	Dennis Holt
25	57	Ervin Pruitt	'67 Dodge	Ervin Pruitt

== Top 10 finishers ==
Pos	Grid	No.	Driver	Manufacturer	Laps	Winnings	Laps led	Time/Status
1	1	71	Bobby Isaac	Dodge	200	$1,000	197	1:37:04
2	20	17	David Pearson	Ford	200	$800	3	+9 seconds
3	2	43	Richard Petty	Ford	200	$400	0	Lead lap under green flag
4	21	48	James Hylton	Dodge	196	$350	0	+4 laps
5	5	06	Neil Castles	Plymouth	195	$325	0	+5 laps
6	7	70	J.D. McDuffie	Buick	191	$300	0	+9 laps
7	10	26	Earl Brooks	Chevrolet	186	$275	0	+14 laps
8	11	08	E.J. Trivette	Ford	183	$270	0	+17 laps
9	6	64	Elmo Langley	Ford	183	$265	0	+17 laps
10	25	57	Ervin Pruitt	Dodge	181	$260	0	+19 laps

== Timeline ==
Section reference:

- Start of race: Bobby Isaac had the pole position to begin the event with.
- Lap 1: Paul Dean Holt managed to blow his engine after barely competing in the race.
- Lap 9: Buster Sexton was black-flagged for something that he shouldn't have done and was disqualified.
- Lap 42: Dick Johnson managed to overheat his vehicle.
- Lap 45: A messed-up axle on Dick Poling's vehicle forced him to end his day early.
- Lap 46: Oil line issues made Wayne Gillette forget about winning the race.
- Lap 49: Problems with the car's steering caused Bill Seifert to end his race day early.
- Lap 62: John Sears' vehicle suffered from a terminal crash; forcing Sears to exit the race.
- Lap 67: David Pearson took over the lead from Bobby Isaac.
- Lap 68: Bobby Isaac took over the lead from David Pearson.
- Lap 107: David Pearson took over the lead from Bobby Isaac.
- Lap 109: Bobby Isaac took over the lead from David Pearson.
- Lap 123: Cecil Gordon apparently quit the race for no apparent reason.
- Lap 133: Transmission problems knocked Pete Hazelwood out of the race.
- Lap 145: A faulty axle caused Bill Champion to leave the race early.
- Lap 150: Jabe Thomas managed to lose the rear end of his vehicle, forcing him to accept 15th-place finish.
- Finish: Bobby Isaac was officially declared the winner of the event.

Preceded by 1969 Kingsport 250	NASCAR Grand National Series Season; 1969	Succeeded by 1969 North State 200
