= 1969 Volunteer 500 =

Auto race held at Bristol International Speedway in 1969

Race details
- Race 33 of 54 in the 1969 NASCAR Grand National Series season
- Layout of Bristol Motor Speedway
- Date: July 20, 1969
- Official name: Volunteer 500
- Location: Bristol International Speedway, Bristol, Tennessee
- Course: Permanent racing facility
- Course length: 0.857 km (0.533 miles)
- Distance: 500 laps, 266.5 mi (428.8 km)
- Weather: Very hot with temperatures of 89.1 °F (31.7 °C); wind speeds of 13 miles per hour (21 km/h)
- Average speed: 79.737 miles per hour (128.324 km/h)
- Attendance: 32,000

Pole position
Driver	Cale Yarborough	Wood Brothers

Most laps led
Driver	David Pearson	Holman-Moody
- Laps: 316

Winner
No. 17	David Pearson	Holman-Moody

Television in the United States
- Network: untelevised
- Announcers: none

The 1969 Volunteer 500 was a NASCAR Grand National Series event that was held on July 20, 1969, at Bristol International Speedway in Bristol, Tennessee; which was rebuilt with more banking for this race.

The transition to purpose-built racecars began in the early 1960s and occurred gradually over that decade. Changes made to the sport by the late 1960s brought an end to the "strictly stock" vehicles of the 1950s.

== Race report ==
It took three hours, eight minutes, and seven seconds for the event to reach its conclusion. David Pearson defeated Bobby Isaac by more than three laps in front of an audience of thirty-two thousand people. Roy Tyner finished 97 laps down and still recorded his only top-10 finish of the season; making this event one of attrition. After this race, Pearson took second on the all-time wins list, where he still sits today some 95 wins behind Petty.

Pearson drove his Ford Torino Talladega to one of his eleven victories of the 1969 NASCAR Cup Series season. Speeds were: 79.737 miles per hour (128.324 km/h) as the average speed and 103.424 miles per hour (166.445 km/h) as the pole position speed. Eight cautions were waved for 56 laps in this race for a total of 266.5 miles (428.9 km). This race would bring Cecil Gordon's first finish in the top five. Even during the late-1960s, starting way back in 24th place and taking fifth at the checkered flag was really considered to be a long distance between the two positions.

Total winnings for this race were $27,685 ($237,383 when adjusted for inflation).

This race's importance in the history book would be that the famous Apollo 11 Moon landing would take place on the same day, with Neil Armstrong making his famous walk on the Moon. Henley Gray deliberately quit the race to get home in time to watch the Moon landing on television; according to urban legend. As a result, he won $550 ($4,716 when adjusted for inflation) in prize money and finished only 206 out of the 500 laps of the race.

Notable crew chiefs for this race were Herb Nab, Harry Hyde, Dale Inman, Banjo Matthews, Glen Wood, Dick Hutcherson, and Cotton Owens.

=== Qualifying ===
Grid	No.	Driver	Manufacturer
1	21	Cale Yarborough	'69 Mercury
2	43	Richard Petty	'69 Ford
3	17	David Pearson	'69 Ford
4	22	Bobby Allison	'69 Dodge
5	6	Buddy Baker	'69 Dodge
6	98	LeeRoy Yarbrough	'69 Ford
7	71	Bobby Isaac	'69 Dodge
8	30	Dave Marcis	'69 Dodge
9	48	James Hylton	'69 Dodge
10	4	John Sears	'67 Ford
11	31	Buddy Young	'67 Chevrolet
12	49	G.C. Spencer	'67 Plymouth
13	32	Dick Brooks	'69 Plymouth
14	76	Ben Arnold	'68 Ford
15	06	Neil Castles	'69 Dodge
16	09	Wayne Gillette	'67 Chevrolet
17	64	Elmo Langley	'68 Ford
18	15	Ed Hessert	'69 Plymouth
19	10	Bill Champion	'68 Ford
20	07	Coo Coo Marlin	'69 Chevrolet
21	34	Wendell Scott	'67 Ford
22	08	E.J. Trivette	'69 Chevrolet
23	25	Jabe Thomas	'68 Plymouth
24	47	Cecil Gordon	'68 Ford
25	45	Bill Seifert	'69 Ford
26	19	Henley Gray	'69 Ford
27	26	Earl Brooks	'67 Ford
28	93	Walson Gardener	'67 Ford
29	57	Bobby Mausgrover	'67 Dodge
30	9	Roy Tyner	'69 Pontiac
31	70	J.D. McDuffie	'67 Buick
32	27	Donnie Allison	'69 Ford

=== Finishing order ===
Section reference:

1. David Pearson† (No. 17)
2. Bobby Isaac† (No. 71)
3. Donnie Allison (No. 27)
4. James Hylton (No. 48)
5. Cecil Gordon (No. 47)
6. Ben Arnold (No. 76)
7. Bill Seifert (No. 45)
8. Bill Champion† (No. 10)
9. J.D. McDuffie† (No. 70)
10. Roy Tyner† (No. 9)
11. LeeRoy Yarbrough*† (No. 98)
12. Walson Gardener* (No. 63)
13. Ed Hessert* (No. 15)
14. Elmo Langley*† (No. 64)
15. Henley Gray* (No. 19)
16. John Sears*† (No. 4)
17. Neil Castles* (No. 06)
18. G.C. Spencer*† (No. 49)
19. Wendell Scott*† (No. 34)
20. Dave Marcis* (No. 30)
21. E.J. Trivette* (No. 08)
22. Buddy Young* (No. 31)
23. Richard Petty* (No. 43)
24. Cale Yarborough*† (No. 21)
25. Dick Brooks*† (No. 32)
26. Bobby Allison*† (No. 22)
27. Buddy Baker*† (No. 6)
28. Jabe Thomas*† (No. 25)
29. Wayne Gillette* (No. 09)
30. Coo Coo Marlin*† (No. 07)
31. Earl Brooks*† (No. 26)
32. Bobby Mausgrover* (No. 57)

† signifies that the driver is known to be deceased
* Driver failed to finish race

== Timeline ==
Section reference:

- Start: Cale Yarborough was leading the other drivers as the green flag was waved in the air.
- Lap 32: Bobby Allison took over the lead from Cale Yarborough.
- Lap 33: James Hylton took over the lead from Bobby Allison.
- Lap 82: David Pearson took over the lead from James Hylton.
- Lap 94: Bobby Isaac took over the lead from David Pearson.
- Lap 97: Donnie Allison took over the lead from Bobby Isaac.
- Lap 183: David Pearson took over the lead from Donnie Allison.
- Lap 345: Bobby Isaac took over the lead from David Pearson.
- Lap 358: LeeRoy Yarbrough took over the lead from Bobby Isaac.
- Lap 359: David Pearson took over the lead from LeeRoy Yarbrough.
- Finish: David Pearson was officially declared the winner of the event.

Preceded by 1968	Volunteer 500 races 1968	Succeeded by 1970

Preceded by 1969 Maryland 300	NASCAR Grand National Season; 1969	Succeeded by 1969 Nashville 400
