= James Hylton =

American racing driver (1934–2018)

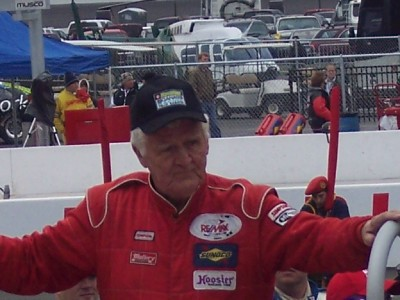
- Hylton at Iowa Speedway in 2006
- Born: James Harvey Hylton; August 26, 1934; Roanoke, Virginia, U.S.
- Died: April 28, 2018 (aged 83); Franklin County, Georgia, U.S.
- Awards: 1966 Grand National Series Rookie of the Year; 1965 Grand National Series Championship Crew Chief; Highest rookie point finish in NASCAR Cup Series history.

NASCAR Cup Series career
- 602 races run over 27 years
- Best finish: 2nd (1966, 1967, 1971)
- First race: 1964 Old Dominion 400 (Manassas)
- Last race: 1993 TranSouth 500 (Darlington)
- First win: 1970 Richmond 500 (Richmond)
- Last win: 1972 Talladega 500 (Talladega)
Wins	Top tens	Poles
2	301	4

NASCAR O'Reilly Auto Parts Series career
- 4 races run over 4 years
- 2011 position: 139th
- Best finish: 135th (2008)
- First race: 1982 Coca-Cola 200 (Rockingham)
- Last race: 2011 Royal Purple 200 (Darlington)
Wins	Top tens	Poles
0	0	0

NASCAR FedEx Freight Truck Series career
- 1 race run over 1 year
- 2011 position: 102nd
- Best finish: 102nd (2011)
- First race: 2011 Good Sam RV Emergency Road Service 125 (Pocono)
Wins	Top tens	Poles
0	0	0
- Statistics up to date as of April 27, 2018.

James Harvey Hylton (August 26, 1934 – April 28, 2018) was an American stock car racing driver. He was a two-time winner in NASCAR Winston Cup Series competition and was a long-time competitor in the ARCA Racing Series. Hylton finished second in points in NASCAR's top series three times. He holds the record for highest points finish by a rookie.

Although he had only two wins at the Cup level, Hylton collected 140 top-fives and 301 top-tens in 601 races. Hylton was in the championship hunt several times in the 1960s and 1970s, finishing second in points in 1966, 1967, and 1971. Hylton also holds the record as the oldest driver to finish a race in NASCAR's top three series when he raced at Daytona in the Xfinity Series (then the Nationwide Series), in 2008 at the age of 73.

== Early life ==
Hylton was born on August 26, 1934, to a Roanoke, Virginia family farm; he was one of thirteen children. Hylton's early years centered primarily around farming but he soon found himself immersed in the world of stock car auto racing.

== Auto racing career ==
Hylton's career in auto racing began in the late 1950s when he began working as a mechanic for Rex White. Hylton, White and Louis Clements teamed to win 26 races and most importantly the 1960 NASCAR Grand National championship. In 1964, White scaled back his driving duties and Hylton began a tenure as crew chief for the Ned Jarrett / Bondy Long team. During the 1964 season, the team won 14 races and finished second in points. In 1965, the team won twelve races and won the NASCAR Grand National championship.

On July 8, 1964, Hylton made his first Grand National start at the Old Dominion 400 at Old Dominion Speedway at Manassas, Virginia. He finished 19th and collected $100 for his efforts. Things improved dramatically in 1966, as Hylton finished second in the points chase and won the series' Rookie of the Year award. Hylton also captured his first pole at Starlite Speedway in Monroe, North Carolina. Hylton again finished second in points during the 1967 season while driving Dodges for owner Bud Hartje. Hylton was a model of consistency during this two-year period as he had 46 top-five finishes in 87 races, finishing second to Richard Petty in the 1967 standings despite having no wins compared to Petty's 27.

Hylton won the NASCAR Winston Cup Rookie of the Year honors in 1966, and finished second in the season points standings, 1,950 points behind David Pearson. He won only two races over his career. Although, he only won two races, he was always in the thick of the championship hunt. He finished in the top-ten in the season points standings in ten of the twelve years between 1966 and 1977.

In the 1972 Talladega 500, Hylton won under interesting circumstances, when Goodyear supplied teams with a special tire for superspeedways. However, this tire design proved to shred after long distances under superspeedway conditions. Because Hylton's team could not afford the new tires they ran with the old ones. Hylton and Ramo Stott, another low tier driver who also could not afford the tires, skated around the other cars, and Hylton won it by less than a second.

=== Dual role ===
In 1968, Hylton became a car owner–driver, a dual role that continued until his death. He found his way to victory lane for the first time on March 1, 1970, at the Richmond 500, driving the familiar No. 48 Ford. During the late sixties and early seventies, Hylton amassed an amazing consistency record that was rivaled only by those of Richard Petty and Cale Yarborough.

On August 6, 1972, Hylton forever etched his name in the history books by claiming the Talladega 500. Hylton led 106 laps of the 188 lap race and won $24,865 for the day. Hylton won by one car length over ARCA legend Ramo Stott.

Hylton continued driving the full schedule until 1982, when he handed over driving duties to Canadian driver Trevor Boys. He soldiered on as an owner in NASCAR Winston Cup until 1993.

=== ARCA ===
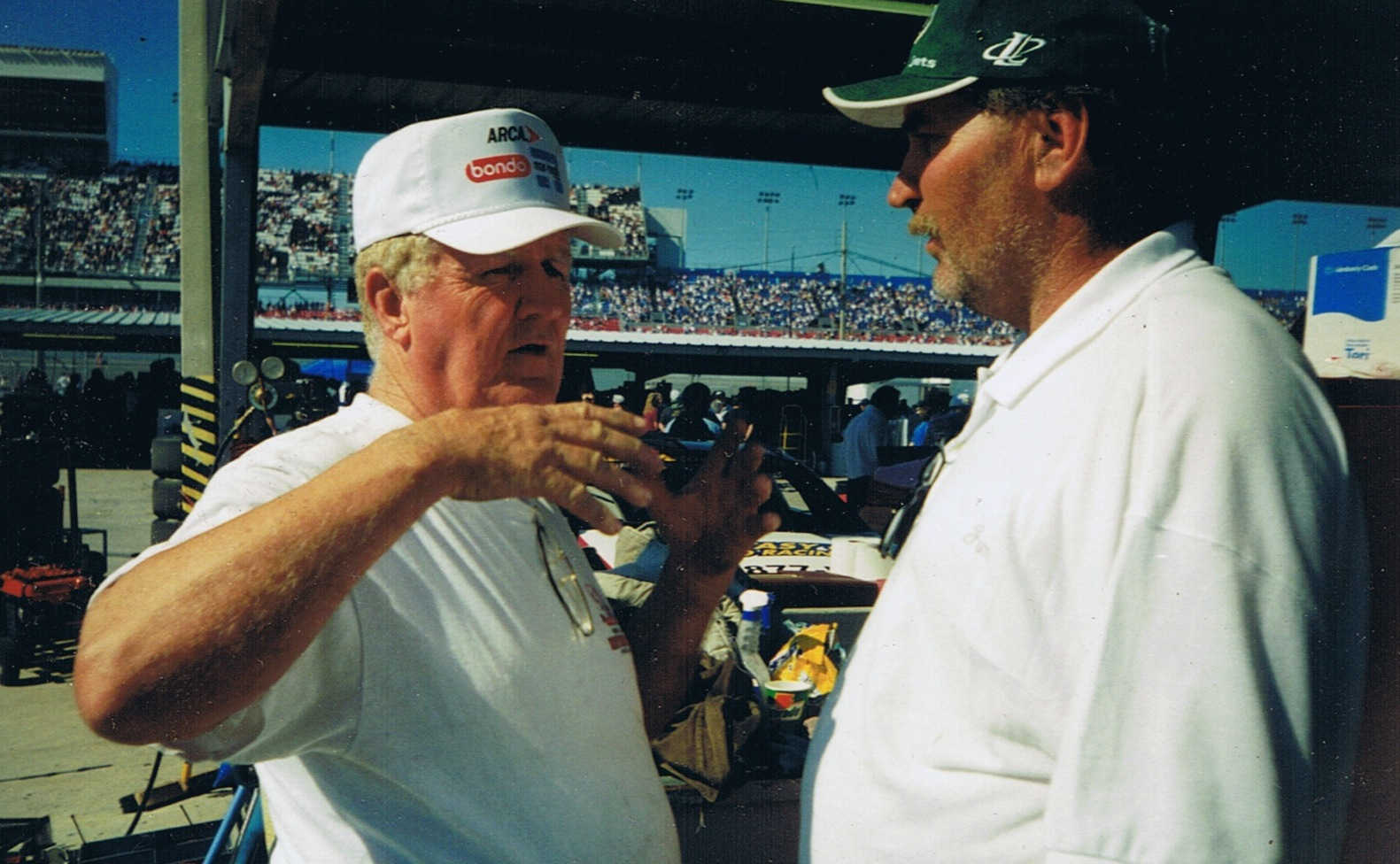
Hylton teaching Jim Lamoreaux how to run Daytona in 1999

Hylton moved to the ARCA Racing Series during the 1990s, and ran in sixteen of 23 ARCA races in 2006. He finished eighteenth in the final points standings. Hylton's final planned race was at the inaugural race at Iowa Speedway, but he returned to compete other events.

=== Comeback ===
Hylton's attempt at a comeback began in 2004, when he attempted to qualify for two races in the Craftsman Truck Series, with Welz Racing and Ron Rhodes Racing, respectively.

On June 24, 2006, Hylton started his first Busch Series race since June 27, 1982 at the AT&T 250 held at the Milwaukee Mile. This made him the oldest driver to start in a 'top level' NASCAR event.

Hylton attempted to make the 2007 Daytona 500 in equipment leased from Richard Childress Racing, sponsored by GrahamFest and Retirement Living TV. Hylton said "I am doing this for seniors to show that at 70 years old, you don't have to go hunting for an old-folks home. You can go race for a little bit."

In the final practice session for the 2007 Daytona 500 he posted the fifteenth fastest time of 48.532 sec./185.445 m.p.h. He was in a position to qualify for the Daytona 500 with ten laps remaining in the qualifier when he was leading, then a caution for a wreck was called and on the restart he fell out of the draft due to a clutch problem. He did not qualify for the race. It was announced that he was going to attempt several others races in 2007, including the UAW-Ford 500, but these plans did not come to fruition.

At the age of 74, Hylton returned to Daytona to attempt to qualify for the 2009 Daytona 500. Hylton signed on with E&M Motorsports for the race. Unfortunately, carburetor issues plagued the team in both Saturday pre-qualifying practice sessions, and Hylton was unable to make a lap. Because NASCAR had a rule that you must make one timed lap in practice to be eligible for qualifying, Hylton and team were forced to withdraw.

Hylton was planning on qualifying his No. 48 car sponsored by the Sons of Confederate Veterans for the ARCA race at Rockingham on April 19, 2009. Hylton lost that sponsorship on April 16, 2009, due to ARCA placing a ban on the organization's logo from being used, as it contains a version of the Confederate Battle Flag. Since this ban breached the contract already entered into by ARCA and the SCV, the SCV cancelled its sponsorship and participation with the race. ARCA was forced to refund the organization's fees due to the breach of contract. Hylton later became a member of the SCV.

Hylton planned to attempt to qualify for the 2010 Daytona 500, but no deal came to fruition. In 2011, Hylton set a record at the 2011 Royal Purple 200 in Darlington as the oldest driver in history to start a NASCAR race in the top three divisions at the age of 76. At the start of the 2013 season, Hylton announced that the 2013 ARCA season would be his last; in his final start in racing at Kansas Speedway in October, contributions from his fellow ARCA racing teams resulted in his being able to drive a brand-new car and engine combination, finishing eighteenth in his final race.

=== Post-retirement team ownership ===
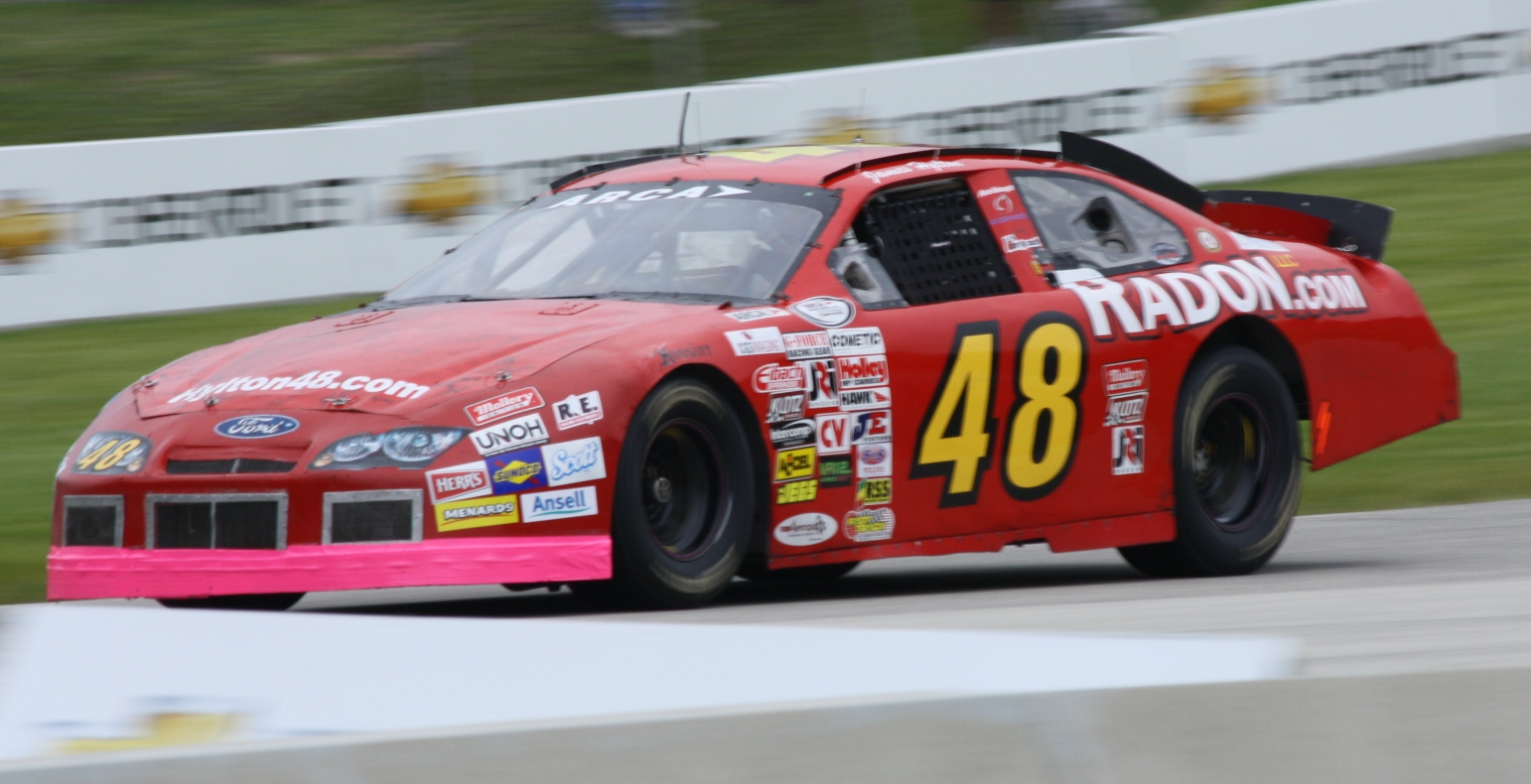
Hylton's 2013 ARCA car at Road America

Hylton stated that his plans following his retirement included continued participation in the ARCA Racing Series as a team owner, planning to hire a younger driver to run the No. 48. Sean Corr ran the car in 2014 along with several other drivers. Corr returned to Daytona in 2015. Brad Smith took over as driver planning the full season, but an injury at Talladega forced him out of the car; James Swanson took over the ride as the team switched to Dodge.

== Death ==
On April 28, 2018, Hylton, his son James "Tweet" Hylton Jr., and the team's crew chief Terry Strange were driving home from the ARCA race at Talladega, and the team's hauler was in a traffic accident going northbound on Interstate 85 near Carnesville, Georgia. Both Hyltons died in the accident, while Strange survived with severe injuries. It was unclear how the accident occurred. There were several conflicting reports once Strange was questioned. One statement claimed that Hylton Sr. was having a heart attack, and when checking, he lost control. Another statement said that Strange lost control and neither Hylton was wearing a seatbelt. Strange's statement said that while driving, a car veered into his lane, causing him to hit a dirt embankment and then crash into the highway median.

== Motorsports career results ==
=== NASCAR ===
(key) (Bold – Pole position awarded by qualifying time. Italics – Pole position earned by points standings or practice time. * – Most laps led.)

==== Grand National Series ====
NASCAR Grand National Series results
Year	Team	No.	Make	1	2	3	4	5	6	7	8	9	10	11	12	13	14	15	16	17	18	19	20	21	22	23	24	25	26	27	28	29	30	31	32	33	34	35	36	37	38	39	40	41	42	43	44	45	46	47	48	49	50	51	52	53	54	55	56	57	58	59	60	61	62	NGNC	Pts	Ref
1964	Bondy Long	71	Ford	CON	AUG	JSP	SAV	RSD	DAY	DAY	DAY	RCH	BRI	GPS	BGS	ATL	ASW	HBO	PIF	CLB	NWS	MAR	SAV	DAR	LGY	HCY	SBO	CLT	GPS	ASH	ATL	CON	NSV	CHT	BIR	VAL	PIF	DAY	ODS; 19	OBS; 16	BRR; 14	ISP	GLN	LIN	BRI	NSV	MBS	AWS	DTS	WVA	CLB	BGS	STR	DAR	HCY	RCH	ODS	HBO	MAR	SAV	NWS	CLT	HAR	AUG	JAC	148th	0	
1966	Hartje-Hylton Racing	48	Dodge	AUG	RSD; 21	DAY; 12	DAY	DAY; 9	CAR; 19	BRI; 3	ATL; 15	HCY	CLB	GPS	BGS	NWS; 35	MAR; 8	DAR; 9	LGY; 4	MGR; 2	**MON**; 22	RCH; 20	CLT; 4	DTS; 3	ASH; 4	PIF	SMR; 8	AWS; 6	BLV; 2	GPS	DAY; 9	ODS; 3	BRR; 2	OXF; 5	FON; 6	ISP; 2*	BRI; 24	SMR; 6		ATL; 4	CLB; 4	AWS; 3	BLV; 3	BGS; 3	DAR; 15	HCY; 4	RCH; 10	HBO; 4	MAR; 5	NWS; 5	CLT; 8	CAR; 10														2nd	33688	
1966	Hartje-Hylton Racing	48	Ford																																				NSV; 10																											2nd	33688	
1967	Hartje-Hylton Racing	48	Dodge	AUG; 4	RSD; 5	DAY; 9	DAY	DAY; 3	AWS; 20	BRI; 14	GPS; 5	BGS; 5	ATL; 6	CLB; 4	HCY; 3	NWS; 9	MAR; 6	SVH; 8	RCH; 4	DAR; 19	BLV; 7	LGY; 3	CLT; 9	ASH; 4	MGR; 2	SMR; 7	BIR; 4	CAR; 8	GPS	MGY; 4	DAY; 8	TRN; 10	**OXF**; 4	FDA; 5	ISP; 2	BRI; 5	SMR; 4	NSV; 2	ATL; 25	BGS; 5	CLB; 5	SVH; 7	DAR; 8	HCY; 4	RCH; 5	BLV; 4	HBO; 4			CLT; 43	CAR; 38	AWS														2nd	36444	
1967	Hartje-Hylton Racing	48	Ford																																													MAR; 4	NWS; 18																	2nd	36444	
1968	Hylton Engineering	48	Dodge	MGR	MGY	RSD; 34	DAY; 44	BRI; 25	RCH	ATL; 15	HCY; 5	GPS	CLB; 3	NWS; 23	MAR; 9	AUG; 4	AWS; 4	DAR; 6	BLV; 4	LGY; 4	CLT; 8	ASH; 4	MGR; 4	SMR; 3	BIR; 3	CAR; 3	GPS	DAY; 13	ISP; 5	OXF; 6	FDA; 6	TRN; 6	BRI; 35	SMR; 5	NSV; 12	ATL; 6	CLB	BGS; 4	AWS; 18	SBO	LGY		HCY; 8	RCH; 8	BLV; 12	HBO; 2	MAR; 21	NWS; 8		CLT; 36	CAR; 7	JFC; 4														7th	2719	
1968	Friedkin Enterprises	15	Plymouth																																							DAR; 26																								7th	2719	
1968	Ervin Pruitt	57	Dodge																																														AUG; 6																	7th	2719	
1969	Hylton Engineering	48	Dodge	MGR; 3	MGY; 3	RSD; 5	DAY; 7	DAY	DAY; 15	CAR; 9	AUG; 4	BRI; 13	ATL; 28	CLB; 4	HCY; 19	GPS; 2	RCH; 15			AWS; 2	DAR; 32	BLV; 5	LGY; 2	CLT; 3	MGR; 20	SMR; 3	MCH; 7	KPT; 7	GPS; 4	NCF; 3	DAY; 9	DOV; 3	TPN; 2	TRN; 4	BLV; 3	BRI; 4	NSV; 3	SMR; 5	ATL; 9	MCH; 9	SBO; 4	BGS; 5	AWS; 5	DAR; 28	HCY; 9	RCH; 6	TAL; Wth	CLB; 3	MAR; 4	NWS; 10	CLT; 11	SVH; 6	AUG; 26	CAR; 28	JFC; 24	MGR; 10	TWS; 4									3rd	3750	
1969	Owens Racing	6	Dodge															NWS; 5	MAR; 30																																															3rd	3750	
1970	Hylton Engineering	48	Dodge	RSD; 35																																																														3rd	3788	
1970	Robertson Racing	23	Plymouth		DAY; 11	DAY	DAY; 22																																																											3rd	3788	
1970	Hylton Engineering	48	Ford					RCH; 1	CAR; 18	SVH; 3	ATL; 6	BRI; 4	TAL; 8	NWS; 4	CLB; 5	DAR; 4	**BLV**; 2	LGY; 4	CLT; 5	SMR; 2	MAR; 7	MCH; 8	RSD; 3	HCY; 13	KPT; 2	GPS; 4	DAY; 7	AST; 6	TPN; 8	TRN; 5	BRI; 11	SMR; 4	NSV; 28	ATL; 10	CLB; 9	ONA; 2	MCH; 9	TAL; 10	BGS; 4	SBO; 5	DAR; 7	HCY; 5	RCH; 8	DOV; 7	NCF; 4	NWS; 5	CLT; 29	MAR; 8	MGR; 6	CAR; 8	LGY; 5															3rd	3788	
1971	Hylton Engineering	48	Ford	RSD; 5	DAY; 8	DAY	DAY; 9		RCH; 10		HCY; 4	BRI; 19	ATL; 9	**CLB**; 4	GPS; 6	SMR; 6		MAR; 5	DAR; 24	SBO; 3	TAL; 7	ASH; 17	KPT; 3	CLT; 13	DOV; 6		RSD; 4	HOU; 2	GPS; 12	DAY; 9	BRI; 5	AST; 4	ISP; 6	TRN; 9	NSV; 2	ATL; 9	BGS; 22	ONA; 3	MCH; 8		CLB; 4	HCY; 6		MAR; 9					RCH; 7	NWS; 7	TWS; 12															2nd	4071	
1971	Hylton Engineering	48	Mercury					ONT; 10		CAR; 18							NWS; 6									MCH; 12														TAL; 5			DAR; 6		CLT; 9	DOV; 10	CAR; 7	MGR																		2nd	4071	

==== Winston Cup Series ====
NASCAR Winston Cup Series results
Year	Team	No.	Make	1	2	3	4	5	6	7	8	9	10	11	12	13	14	15	16	17	18	19	20	21	22	23	24	25	26	27	28	29	30	31	32	33	34	35	36	NNCC	Pts	Ref
1972	Hylton Engineering	48	Ford	RSD; 7	DAY; 5		ONT; 7		ATL; 10	BRI; 8	DAR; 5	NWS; 4	MAR; 7	TAL; 33	CLT; 20	DOV; 7	MCH; 4	RSD; 4	TWS; 6	DAY; 5	BRI; 12	TRN; 6	ATL; 35		MCH; 6	NSV; 8		RCH; 4	DOV; 4	MAR; 8	NWS; 17		CAR; 19							3rd	8158.7	
1972	Hylton Engineering	48	Dodge			RCH; 6																																		3rd	8158.7	
1972	Hylton Engineering	48	Mercury					CAR; 6																TAL; 1*			DAR; 11					CLT; 7		TWS; 11						3rd	8158.7	
1973	Hylton Engineering	48	Mercury	RSD; 12	DAY; 7	RCH; 9	CAR; 11	BRI; 8	ATL; 21	NWS; 8	DAR; 23		TAL; 45	NSV; 12	CLT; 12	DOV; 12				DAY; 12	BRI; 8		TAL; 4	NSV; 6	DAR; 12	RCH; 8		NWS; 12	MAR; 8											4th	6972.75	
1973	Hylton Engineering	48	Ford									MAR; 10					TWS; 15	RSD; 8	MCH; 15			ATL; 21																		4th	6972.75	
1973	Hylton Engineering	48	Chevy																								DOV; 19			CLT; 13	CAR; 19									4th	6972.75	
1974	Hylton Engineering	48	Chevy	RSD	DAY; 16	RCH; 6	CAR; 10	BRI; 8	ATL; 12	DAR; 26	NWS; 28	MAR; 7	TAL; 14	NSV; 24	DOV; 10	CLT; 15	RSD; 6	MCH; 32	DAY; 32	BRI; 20	NSV; 22	ATL; 23	POC; 34	TAL; 12	MCH; 35	DAR; 5	RCH; 23	DOV; 19	NWS; 24	MAR; 6	CLT; 11	CAR; 18	ONT; 14							11th	924.95	
1975	Hylton Engineering	48	Chevy	RSD; 6	DAY; 10	RCH; 14	CAR; 8	BRI; 5	ATL; 13	NWS; 11	DAR; 8	MAR; 10	TAL; 33	NSV; 9	DOV; 4	CLT; 20	RSD; 13	MCH; 9	DAY; 11	NSV; 11	POC; 9	TAL; 7	MCH; 17	DAR; 23	DOV; 7	NWS; 13	MAR; 13	CLT; 6	RCH; 6	CAR; 15	BRI; 9	ATL; 22	ONT; 9							3rd	3914	
1976	Hylton Engineering	48	Chevy	RSD; 9	DAY; 23	CAR; 19	RCH; 15	BRI; 7	ATL; 31	NWS; 13	DAR; 32	MAR; 12	TAL; 28	NSV; 18	DOV; 17	CLT; 13	RSD; 16	MCH; 35	DAY; 26	NSV; 11	POC; 17	TAL; 4	MCH; 21	BRI; 13	DAR; 20	RCH; 16	DOV; 9	MAR; 18	NWS; 11	CLT; 18		ATL; 12	ONT; 5							13th	3380	
1976	Faustina Racing	5	Dodge																												CAR; 29									13th	3380	
1977	Hylton Engineering	48	Chevy	RSD; 14	DAY; 10	RCH; 8	CAR; 9	ATL; 38	NWS; 9	DAR; 32	BRI; 7	MAR; 17	TAL; 18	NSV; 11	DOV; 33	CLT; 28	RSD; 14	MCH; 11	DAY; 39	NSV; 19	POC; 10	TAL; 9	MCH; 16	BRI; 9	DAR; 13	RCH; 9	DOV; 16	MAR; 8	NWS; 12	CLT; 14	CAR; 13	ATL; 26	ONT; 9							7th	3476	
1978	Hylton Engineering	48	Chevy	RSD	DAY	RCH; 11	CAR; 15	ATL	BRI; 7	DAR	NWS; 12	MAR; 7				NSV; 11	RSD	MCH	DAY	NSV			MCH; 35	BRI; 17	DAR; 7	RCH; 18		MAR; 11	NWS; 16	CLT; 15	CAR; 14	ATL								26th	1965	
1978	Hylton Engineering	48	Olds										TAL; 10	DOV	CLT																		ONT; 16							26th	1965	
1978	Hylton Engineering	18	Chevy																		POC; 39						DOV; 34													26th	1965	
1978	Al Rudd Auto	12	Buick																			TAL; 41																		26th	1965	
1979	Hylton Engineering	48	Chevy	RSD; 11	DAY; DNQ	CAR; 7	RCH; 12	ATL; 13	NWS; 16	BRI; 9	DAR; 15	MAR; 7		NSV; 22	DOV; 17	CLT; 33	TWS; 10	RSD; 14	MCH; 20	DAY; 19	NSV; 6	POC; 33		MCH; 12	BRI; 13	DAR; 38	RCH; 21		MAR; 23		NWS; 11	CAR; 11	ATL; 16	ONT; 26						14th	3405	
1979	Hylton Engineering	48	Olds										TAL; 15										TAL; 20					DOV; 14												14th	3405	
1979	Hylton Engineering	4	Chevy																											CLT; 23										14th	3405	
1980	Hylton Engineering	8	Chevy	RSD; 11																																				13th	3449	
1980	Hylton Engineering	48	Olds		DAY; 26															DAY; 24			TAL; 14	MCH; 25																13th	3449	
1980	Hylton Engineering	48	Chevy			RCH; 7	CAR; 13	ATL; 39	BRI; 14	DAR; 18	NWS; 17	MAR; 18	TAL; 13	NSV; 13	DOV; 19	CLT; 23	TWS; 10	RSD; 12	MCH; 24		NSV; 17	POC; 15			BRI; 17	DAR; 21	RCH; 17	DOV; 19	NWS; 15	MAR; 10		CAR; 9	ATL; 14	ONT; 24						13th	3449	
1980	Gray Racing	19	Chevy																												CLT; 21									13th	3449	
1981	Hylton Racing	48	Chevy	RSD; 11						NWS; 15																														19th	2753	
1981	Hylton Racing	48	Pontiac		DAY; 34	RCH; 29	CAR; 20	ATL; 25	BRI		DAR; 19	MAR; 17	TAL; 19	NSV; 21	DOV; 18	CLT; 16	TWS; 25	RSD; 19	MCH; 23	DAY; 22	NSV; 16	POC; 22	TAL; 39	MCH; 27	BRI; 16	DAR; 26	RCH; 18	DOV; 32	MAR	NWS; 15	CLT	CAR; 26								19th	2753	
1981	Hylton Racing	48	Buick																														ATL; 19	RSD; 17						19th	2753	
1982	Hylton Racing	49	Buick	DAY; DNQ	RCH	BRI	ATL	CAR	DAR	NWS	MAR	TAL																												28th	1514	
1982	Hylton Racing	48	Pontiac										NSV; 17	DOV; 12	CLT	POC	RSD			NSV; 20	POC; 12			BRI; 23	DAR; 18	RCH; 17	DOV; 15													28th	1514	
1982	Hylton Racing	48	Buick															MCH; 23	DAY; 19			TAL; 25																		28th	1514	
1982	Hylton Racing	48	Chevy																				MCH; 22					NWS; 17	CLT	MAR; 16	CAR	ATL	RSD							28th	1514	
1983	Hylton Racing	48	Chevy	DAY; 23	RCH; 21	CAR	ATL	DAR	NWS	MAR	TAL	NSV	DOV	BRI	CLT	RSD	POC	MCH	DAY	NSV	POC	TAL	MCH	BRI	DAR	RCH	DOV	MAR	NWS	CLT	CAR	ATL	RSD							NA	0	
1985	Hylton Racing	49	Chevy	DAY	RCH	CAR	ATL	BRI	DAR	NWS	MAR	TAL	DOV; 26	CLT	RSD	POC	MCH	DAY	POC	TAL	MCH	BRI	DAR	RCH	DOV	MAR	NWS	CLT	CAR	ATL	RSD									NA	0	
1986	Hylton Racing	48	Chevy	DAY	RCH	CAR	ATL; DNQ	BRI; DNQ	DAR	NWS	MAR	TAL	DOV	CLT; DNQ	RSD	POC	MCH; 38	DAY; DNQ	POC	TAL	GLN; 27	MCH	BRI	DAR; 39	RCH; 22	DOV	MAR	NWS	CLT	CAR	ATL	RSD								46th	386	
1987	Hylton Racing	48	Chevy	DAY	CAR; 37	RCH	ATL	DAR; 38	NWS	BRI	MAR	TAL	CLT	DOV	POC; DNQ	RSD	MCH	DAY	POC	TAL	GLN	MCH	BRI	DAR	RCH	DOV	MAR	NWS	CLT	CAR	RSD	ATL								81st	101	
1988	Hylton Racing	48	Chevy	DAY	RCH	CAR	ATL	DAR	BRI	NWS	MAR	TAL	CLT	DOV	RSD	POC	MCH	DAY	POC	TAL	GLN	MCH	BRI	DAR	RCH	DOV; DNQ	MAR	CLT	NWS	CAR	PHO	ATL								NA	-	
1989	Hylton Racing	49	Buick	DAY	CAR	ATL	RCH	DAR	BRI	NWS	MAR	TAL	CLT	DOV	SON	POC	MCH	DAY	POC	TAL; DNQ	GLN	MCH; DNQ	BRI	DAR; 39	RCH	DOV; 39	MAR	CLT	NWS; DNQ	CAR	PHO	ATL								74th	92	
1990	Hylton Racing	48	Buick	DAY	RCH	CAR	ATL	DAR	BRI	NWS	MAR	TAL	CLT	DOV	SON	POC	MCH	DAY	POC	TAL	GLN	MCH	BRI	DAR	RCH	DOV; 35	MAR	NWS	CLT											106th	0	
1990	Hylton Racing	48	Pontiac																											CAR; DNQ	PHO	ATL								106th	0	
1991	Hylton Racing	48	Chevy	DAY	RCH	CAR	ATL	DAR	BRI	NWS	MAR	TAL	CLT	DOV	SON	POC; 37	MCH	DAY																						54th	196	
1991	Hylton Racing	48	Buick																POC; DNQ	TAL	GLN	MCH	BRI	DAR; 38	RCH; DNQ	DOV; 37	MAR; DNQ	NWS	CLT	CAR; 40	PHO	ATL								54th	196	
1992	Hylton Racing	48	Chevy	DAY; DNQ	CAR	RCH	ATL											DAY; DNQ				MCH; DNQ	BRI		RCH; DNQ															42nd	476	
1992	Hylton Racing	48	Pontiac					DAR; 39	BRI	NWS; DNQ	MAR	TAL; DNQ	CLT; DNQ	DOV; 35	SON	POC; 26	MCH; 25		POC; 40	TAL; DNQ	GLN; 39			DAR; 37		DOV; 35	MAR	NWS	CLT; DNQ	CAR; DNQ	PHO	ATL; DNQ								42nd	476	
1993	Stavola Brothers Racing	48	Ford	DAY; DNQ																																				64th	104	
1993	Hylton Motorsports	48	Pontiac		CAR; 40	RCH	ATL; DNQ	DAR; 34	BRI; DNQ	NWS; DNQ	MAR	TAL; DNQ	SON	CLT; DNQ	DOV	POC	MCH	DAY; DNQ	NHA	POC	TAL	GLN	MCH; DNQ	BRI	DAR	RCH	DOV	MAR	NWS; DNQ	CLT	CAR	PHO	ATL							64th	104	
1994	Hylton Motorsports	48	Pontiac	DAY	CAR; DNQ	RCH	ATL	DAR	BRI	NWS	MAR	TAL	SON	CLT	DOV	POC	MCH	DAY	NHA	POC	TAL	IND; DNQ	GLN	MCH	BRI	DAR	RCH	DOV	MAR	NWS	CLT	CAR	PHO	ATL						NA	-	
1995	Hylton Motorsports	48	Pontiac	DAY; DNQ	CAR; DNQ	RCH	ATL	DAR	BRI	NWS	MAR	TAL	SON	CLT	DOV	POC	MCH	DAY	NHA	POC	TAL	IND	GLN	MCH	BRI	DAR	RCH	DOV	MAR	NWS	CLT	CAR	PHO	ATL						NA	-	
2007	Hylton Motorsports	58	Chevy	DAY; DNQ	CAL	LVS	ATL	BRI	MAR	TEX	PHO	TAL	RCH	DAR	CLT	DOV	POC	MCH	SON	NHA	DAY	CHI	IND	POC	GLN	MCH	BRI	CAL	RCH	NHA	DOV	KAN	TAL	CLT	MAR	ATL	TEX	PHO	HOM	76th	0	

===== Daytona 500 =====
Year	Team	Manufacturer	Start	Finish
1966	Bud Hartje	Dodge	23	9
1967	Bud Hartje	Dodge	19	3
1968	Hylton Motorsports	Dodge	14	44
1969	Hylton Motorsports	Dodge	15	15
1970	Robertson Racing	Plymouth	21	22
1971	Hylton Motorsports	Ford	15	9
1972	Hylton Motorsports	Ford	35	5
1973	Hylton Motorsports	Mercury	12	7
1974	Hylton Motorsports	Chevrolet	19	16
1975	Hylton Motorsports	Chevrolet	17	10
1976	Hylton Motorsports	Chevrolet	29	23
1977	Hylton Motorsports	Chevrolet	37	10
1979	Hylton Motorsports	Chevrolet	DNQ	
1980	Hylton Motorsports	Oldsmobile	37	26
1981	Hylton Motorsports	Pontiac	25	34
1982	Hylton Motorsports	Buick	DNQ	
1983	Hylton Motorsports	Chevrolet	29	23
1992	Hylton Motorsports	Chevrolet	DNQ	
1993	Stavola Brothers Racing	Ford	DNQ	
1995	Hylton Motorsports	Pontiac	DNQ	
2007	Hylton Motorsports	Chevrolet	DNQ	

==== Nationwide Series ====
NASCAR Nationwide Series results
Year	Team	No.	Make	1	2	3	4	5	6	7	8	9	10	11	12	13	14	15	16	17	18	19	20	21	22	23	24	25	26	27	28	29	30	31	32	33	34	35	NNSC	Pts	Ref
1982			Chevy	DAY	RCH	BRI	MAR	DAR	HCY	SBO	CRW	RCH	LGY	DOV	HCY	CLT	ASH	HCY	SBO	CAR; 23	CRW	SBO	HCY	LGY	IRP	BRI	HCY	RCH	MAR	CLT	HCY	MAR							150th	94	
1983		46	Buick	DAY; DNQ	RCH	CAR	HCY	MAR	NWS	SBO	GPS	LGY	DOV	BRI	CLT	SBO	HCY	ROU	SBO	ROU	CRW	ROU	SBO	HCY	LGY	IRP	GPS	BRI	HCY	DAR	RCH	NWS	SBO	MAR	ROU	CLT	HCY	MAR	NA	-	
2006	Jay Robinson Racing	28	Chevy	DAY	CAL	MXC	LVS	ATL	BRI	TEX	NSH	PHO	TAL	RCH	DAR	CLT	DOV	NSH	KEN	MLW; 41	DAY	CHI	NHA	MAR	GTY	IRP	GLN	MCH	BRI	CAL	RCH	DOV	KAN	CLT	MEM	TEX	PHO	HOM	142nd	40	
2008	JD Motorsports	01	Chevy	DAY	CAL	LVS	ATL	BRI	NSH	TEX	PHO	MXC	TAL	RCH	DAR	CLT	DOV	NSH	KEN	MLW	NHA	DAY; 36	CHI	GTY	IRP	CGV	GLN	MCH	BRI	CAL	RCH	DOV	KAN	CLT	MEM	TEX	PHO	HOM	135th	55	
2011	JD Motorsports	0	Chevy	DAY	PHO	LVS	BRI	CAL	TEX	TAL	NSH	RCH	DAR; 43	DOV	IOW	CLT	CHI	MCH	ROA	DAY	KEN	NHA	NSH	IRP	IOW	GLN	CGV	BRI	ATL	RCH	CHI	DOV	KAN	CLT	TEX	PHO	HOM		139th	0^{1}	

==== Camping World Truck Series ====
NASCAR Camping World Truck Series results
Year	Team	No.	Make	1	2	3	4	5	6	7	8	9	10	11	12	13	14	15	16	17	18	19	20	21	22	23	24	25	NCWTC	Pts	Ref
2004	Welz Racing	77	Dodge	DAY	ATL	MAR	MFD	CLT	DOV	TEX	MEM	MLW	KAN	KEN	GTW	MCH	IRP	NSH; DNQ	BRI										NA	-	
2004	Ron Rhodes Racing	48	Dodge																	RCH; DNQ	NHA	LVS	CAL	TEX	MAR	PHO	DAR	HOM	NA	-	
2011	Norm Benning Racing	75	Chevy	DAY	PHO	DAR	MAR	NSH	DOV	CLT	KAN	TEX	KEN	IOW	NSH	IRP	POC; 30	MCH	BRI	ATL	CHI	NHA	KEN	LVS	TAL	MAR	TEX	HOM	102nd	0^{1}	

^{*} Season still in progress
^{1} Ineligible for series points

=== ARCA Racing Series ===
(key) (Bold – Pole position awarded by qualifying time. Italics – Pole position earned by points standings or practice time. * – Most laps led.)

ARCA Racing Series results
Year	Team	No.	Make	1	2	3	4	5	6	7	8	9	10	11	12	13	14	15	16	17	18	19	20	21	22	23	24	25	ARSC	Pts	Ref
1975		0	Chevy	SLM	DAY; 6	SLM	TAL	QCS	NSV	TOL	SLM	AVS	FMS	JEF	TOL	AND													NA	0	N/A
1986	Hylton Motorsports	48	Chevy	ATL	DAY	ATL	TAL	SIR	SSP	FRS	KIL	CSP	TAL	BLN	ISF	DSF	TOL	MCS	ATL; 30										95th	-	
1987	Hylton Motorsports	48	Chevy	DAY	ATL; DNQ	TAL	DEL	ACS	TOL	ROC	POC	FRS	KIL	TAL	FRS	ISF	INF	DSF	SLM	ATL									NA	-	
1988	Hylton Motorsports	49	Chevy	DAY	ATL	TAL	FRS	PCS	ROC	POC	WIN	KIL	ACS	SLM	POC; 14														108th	-	
1988	Hylton Motorsports	48	Chevy													TAL; DNQ	DEL	FRS	ISF	DSF	SLM	ATL							108th	-	
1989	Hylton Motorsports	48	Chevy	DAY	ATL	KIL	TAL; DNQ	FRS	POC	KIL	HAG																		69th	-	
1989	Hylton Motorsports	49	Buick									POC; 14																	69th	-	
1989	Hylton Motorsports	48	Buick										TAL; 35	DEL	FRS	ISF	TOL	DSF	SLM	ATL									69th	-	
1990	Hylton Motorsports	49	Buick	DAY; DNQ	ATL	KIL	TAL	FRS	POC	KIL	TOL	HAG	POC	TAL	MCH	ISF	TOL	DSF	WIN	DEL	ATL								NA	-	
1991	Hylton Motorsports	4	Pontiac	DAY	ATL	KIL	TAL	TOL	FRS	POC	MCH; 30	KIL	FRS	DEL	POC														84th	-	
1991			Buick													TAL; 25	HPT	MCH	ISF	TOL	DSF	TWS	ATL						84th	-	
1993	Peterson Motorsports	06	Pontiac	DAY	FIF	TWS	TAL; 27	KIL	CMS	FRS	TOL	POC	MCH	FRS															83rd	-	
1993	Hylton Motorsports	48	Pontiac												POC; 26	KIL	ISF	DSF	TOL	SLM	WIN	ATL							83rd	-	
1994	Hylton Motorsports	48	Pontiac	DAY	TAL	FIF; 20	LVL	KIL	TOL	FRS	MCH																		69th	410	
1994	Hylton Motorsports	4	Pontiac									DMS; 15																	69th	410	
1994	Charlie Newby Racing	77	Pontiac										POC; 27	POC	KIL	FRS	INF	I70	ISF	DSF	TOL	SLM	WIN	ATL					69th	410	
1997	Peterson Motorsports	06	Pontiac	DAY	ATL	SLM	CLT	CLT	POC; 14	MCH	SBS	TOL	KIL	FRS	MIN	POC	MCH	DSF	GTW	SLM	WIN	CLT	TAL	ISF	ATL				135th	-	
1998	Hylton Motorsports	48	Pontiac	DAY	ATL	SLM; 22	CLT	MEM	MCH																				NA	0	
1998	Hylton Motorsports	76	Olds							POC; 37	SBS	TOL									TEX; 30	WIN							NA	0	
1998	Hylton Motorsports	76	Pontiac										PPR; 35	POC	KIL														NA	0	
1998	Hylton Motorsports	44	Buick													FRS; 24	ISF	ATL	DSF	SLM									NA	0	
1998	Drew White Racing	12	Chevy																				CLT; DNQ	TAL	ATL; 37				NA	0	
1999		12	Chevy	DAY; DNQ																									42nd	730	
1999		49			ATL; DNQ	SLM	AND	CLT																					42nd	730	
1999	Drew White Racing	12	Pontiac						MCH; DNQ	POC																			42nd	730	
1999	Hylton Motorsports	48	Chevy								TOL; DNQ	SBS; DNQ	BLN; 30	POC	KIL; 27	FRS; 24	FLM												42nd	730	
1999	Hylton Motorsports	48	Ford															ISF; 22	WIN	DSF; 24	SLM; 18	CLT	TAL	ATL					42nd	730	
2001	Cunningham Motorsports	4	Ford	DAY	NSH; 33																CHI; 39	DSF	SLM	TOL	BLN				62nd	585	
2001	Hylton Motorsports	47	Ford			WIN; 29	SLM																						62nd	585	
2001	Hylton Motorsports	8	Ford					GTY; 33	KEN	CLT									NSH; 33	ISF; DNQ									62nd	585	
2001	Schacht-Hixson Motorsports	75	Chevy								KAN; 34																		62nd	585	
2001	Markle Motorsports	60	Ford									MCH; 38	POC	MEM	GLN	KEN	MCH	POC											62nd	585	
2001	Challenge Motorsports	15	Ford																							CLT; 37	TAL		62nd	585	
2001	Hylton Motorsports	48	Ford																									ATL; 21	62nd	585	
2002	Andy Belmont Motorsports	91	Ford	DAY	ATL	NSH	SLM	KEN	CLT	KAN	POC; 35	MCH; 41	TOL					NSH; 36	ISF	WIN	DSF								89th	320	
2002	Brad Smith Motorsports	76	Ford											SBO; 31	KEN														89th	320	
2002	Peterson Motorsports	06	Chevy													BLN; 34													89th	320	
2002	Hylton Motorsports	43	Ford														POC; 36												89th	320	
2002	Cunningham Motorsports	4	Ford																			CHI; 36	SLM	TAL	CLT				89th	320	
2003	Hylton Motorsports	48	Ford	DAY	ATL	NSH	SLM	TOL	KEN	CLT	BLN	KAN; 16	MCH	LER	POC	POC	NSH	ISF	WIN; 22	DSF									85th	315	
2003	Benning Motorsports	8	Chevy																		CHI; 37	SLM	TAL	CLT	SBO				85th	315	
2004	James Hylton Motorsports	48	Ford	DAY	NSH	SLM	KEN	TOL	CLT	KAN; 20	POC; 40	MCH	SBO	BLN	KEN	GTW	POC	LER	NSH	ISF	TOL	DSF	CHI	SLM	TAL				141st	130	
2005	James Hylton Motorsports	48	Ford	DAY	NSH	SLM	KEN	TOL	LAN	MIL	POC	MCH	KAN; 22	KEN	BLN	POC; 22	GTW; 26	LER	NSH; 36	MCH									77th	390	
2005	James Hylton Motorsports	49	Ford																		ISF; DNQ	TOL	DSF	CHI	SLM	TAL			77th	390	
2006	James Hylton Motorsports	48	Ford	DAY; DNQ	NSH; DNQ	SLM; DNQ	WIN; DNQ	KEN; DNQ	TOL; DNQ	POC; 21	MCH; DNQ	KAN; 23	KEN; 23	BLN; 31	POC; 24	GTW; 23	NSH; 22	MCH; 32	ISF; 24	MIL; 26	TOL; 25	DSF; 25	CHI; 27	SLM; 27	TAL; 32	IOW; 37			18th	2995	
2007	James Hylton Motorsports	48	Dodge	DAY	USA	NSH	SLM	KAN	WIN	KEN	TOL	IOW	POC	MCH; DNQ	BLN	KEN	POC; 22	NSH	ISF							TOL; DNQ			107th	200	
2007	Carter 2 Motorsports	67	Dodge																	MIL; 40	GTW	DSF	CHI	SLM	TAL				107th	200	
2008	James Hylton Motorsports	48	Dodge	DAY; DNQ	SLM; 34	IOW		CAR; 28	KEN	TOL; DNQ	POC; 35		CAY; 19	KEN	BLN; 28			ISF; 35	DSF; 35		SLM; 27								27th	1325	
2008	Bowsher Motorsports	21	Ford				KAN; 37																						27th	1325	
2008	James Hylton Motorsports	08	Dodge									MCH; 32				POC; 35													27th	1325	
2008	James Hylton Motorsports	14	Dodge														NSH; 35			CHI; 38									27th	1325	
2008	James Hylton Motorsports	0	Dodge																			NJE; 26	TAL	TOL					27th	1325	
2009	James Hylton Motorsports	08	Dodge	DAY; DNQ																									15th	3180	
2009	James Hylton Motorsports	48	Ford		SLM; 23	CAR; 28		KEN; 36	TOL; 23	POC; 24	MCH; 24	MFD; 26	IOW; 27	KEN; 28	BLN; 24	POC; 31	ISF; 28	CHI; 27	TOL; 29	DSF; 30	NJE; 26	SLM; 26	KAN; 27	CAR; 37					15th	3180	
2009	James Hylton Motorsports	48	Dodge				TAL; 15																						15th	3180	
2010	James Hylton Motorsports	18	Ford	DAY	PBE; 29	SLM																							19th	1720	
2010	James Hylton Motorsports	48	Dodge				TEX; 37																						19th	1720	
2010	James Hylton Motorsports	48	Ford					TAL; 37	TOL	POC; 21	MCH; 30	IOW; 36	MFD; 24	POC	BLN; 25	NJE; 27	ISF; 25	CHI; 21	DSF; 28	TOL; 18	SLM; 24	KAN; 32	CAR; 28						19th	1720	
2011	James Hylton Motorsports	48	Ford	DAY; 18	TAL; 33	SLM; 23	TOL; 27	NJE; 30	CHI; 19	POC; 21	MCH; 27	WIN; 17	BLN; 22	IOW; 22	IRP; 25	POC; 27	ISF; 26	MAD; 19	DSF; 29	SLM; 18	KAN; 23	TOL; 30							11th	3090	
2012	James Hylton Motorsports	48	Ford	DAY; 38	MOB; 33	SLM; 25	TAL; 24	TOL; 32	ELK; 20	POC; 22	MCH; 22	WIN; 25	NJE; 27	IOW; 24	CHI; 22	IRP; 32	POC; 30	BLN; 24	ISF; 27	MAD; 22	SLM; 24	DSF; C	KAN; 29						13th	2860	
2013	James Hylton Motorsports	48	Ford	DAY; 26	MOB; 23	SLM; 26	TAL; 33	TOL; 28	ELK; 19	POC; 24	MCH; 24	ROA; 26	WIN; 19	CHI; 17	NJE; 18	POC; 29	BLN; 21	ISF; 29	MAD; 17	DSF; 26	IOW; 24	SLM; 22	KEN; 21	KAN; 18					11th	3630	
Results before 1985 may be incomplete.
