= 1995 Purolator 500 =

Fourth race of the 1995 NASCAR Winston Cup Series

Race details
- Race 4 of 31 in the 1995 NASCAR Winston Cup Series
- The 1995 Purolator 500 program cover, featuring Bill Elliott.
- Date: March 12, 1995
- Official name: 36th Annual Purolator 500
- Location: Hampton, Georgia, Atlanta Motor Speedway
- Course: Permanent racing facility
- Course length: 1.522 miles (2.449 km)
- Distance: 328 laps, 499.216 mi (803.41 km)
- Average speed: 150.115 miles per hour (241.587 km/h)

Pole position
Driver	Dale Earnhardt	Richard Childress Racing
- Time: 29.605

Most laps led
Driver	Jeff Gordon	Hendrick Motorsports
- Laps: 250

Winner
No. 3	Jeff Gordon	Hendrick Motorsports

Television in the United States
- Network: ABC
- Announcers: Bob Jenkins, Benny Parsons

Radio in the United States
- Radio: Performance Racing Network

The 1995 Purolator 500 was the fourth stock car race of the 1995 NASCAR Winston Cup Series and the 36th iteration of the event. The race was held on Saturday, March 12, 1995, in Hampton, Georgia at Atlanta Motor Speedway, a 1.522 miles (2.449 km) permanent asphalt quad-oval intermediate speedway. The race took the scheduled 328 laps to complete. At race's end, Hendrick Motorsports driver Jeff Gordon would manage to dominate the majority of the race to take his fourth career NASCAR Winston Cup Series victory and his second victory of the season. To fill out the top three, Joe Gibbs Racing driver Bobby Labonte and Hendrick Motorsports driver Terry Labonte would finish second and third, respectively.

== Background ==
The layout of Atlanta Motor Speedway, the circuit where the race was held.

Atlanta Motor Speedway (formerly Atlanta International Raceway) is a 1.522-mile race track in Hampton, Georgia, United States, 20 miles (32 km) south of Atlanta. It has annually hosted NASCAR Winston Cup Series stock car races since its inauguration in 1960.

The venue was bought by Speedway Motorsports in 1990. In 1994, 46 condominiums were built over the northeastern side of the track. In 1997, to standardize the track with Speedway Motorsports' other two intermediate ovals, the entire track was almost completely rebuilt. The frontstretch and backstretch were swapped, and the configuration of the track was changed from oval to quad-oval, with a new official length of 1.54-mile (2.48 km) where before it was 1.522-mile (2.449 km). The project made the track one of the fastest on the NASCAR circuit.

=== Entry list ===
- (R) - denotes rookie driver.

#	Driver	Team	Make
1	Rick Mast	Precision Products Racing	Pontiac
2	Rusty Wallace	Penske Racing South	Ford
3	Dale Earnhardt	Richard Childress Racing	Chevrolet
4	Sterling Marlin	Morgan–McClure Motorsports	Chevrolet
5	Terry Labonte	Hendrick Motorsports	Chevrolet
6	Mark Martin	Roush Racing	Ford
7	Geoff Bodine	Geoff Bodine Racing	Ford
8	Jeff Burton	Stavola Brothers Racing	Ford
9	Lake Speed	Melling Racing	Ford
10	Ricky Rudd	Rudd Performance Motorsports	Ford
11	Brett Bodine	Brett Bodine Racing	Ford
12	Derrike Cope	Bobby Allison Motorsports	Ford
15	Dick Trickle	Bud Moore Engineering	Ford
16	Ted Musgrave	Roush Racing	Ford
17	Darrell Waltrip	Darrell Waltrip Motorsports	Chevrolet
18	Bobby Labonte	Joe Gibbs Racing	Chevrolet
19	Phil Parsons	TriStar Motorsports	Ford
21	Morgan Shepherd	Wood Brothers Racing	Ford
22	Randy LaJoie (R)	Bill Davis Racing	Pontiac
23	Jimmy Spencer	Haas-Carter Motorsports	Ford
24	Jeff Gordon	Hendrick Motorsports	Chevrolet
25	Ken Schrader	Hendrick Motorsports	Chevrolet
26	Steve Kinser	King Racing	Ford
27	Loy Allen Jr.	Junior Johnson & Associates	Ford
28	Dale Jarrett	Robert Yates Racing	Ford
29	Steve Grissom	Diamond Ridge Motorsports	Chevrolet
30	Michael Waltrip	Bahari Racing	Pontiac
31	Ward Burton	A.G. Dillard Motorsports	Chevrolet
32	Jimmy Hensley	Active Motorsports	Chevrolet
33	Robert Pressley (R)	Leo Jackson Motorsports	Chevrolet
37	John Andretti	Kranefuss-Haas Racing	Ford
40	Greg Sacks	Dick Brooks Racing	Pontiac
41	Ricky Craven (R)	Larry Hedrick Motorsports	Chevrolet
42	Kyle Petty	Team SABCO	Pontiac
43	Bobby Hamilton	Petty Enterprises	Pontiac
44	Jeff Purvis	Phoenix Racing	Chevrolet
47	Billy Standridge	Standridge Motorsports	Ford
52	Gary Bradberry	Jimmy Means Racing	Ford
66	Ben Hess	RaDiUs Motorsports	Ford
67	Ken Bouchard	Cunningham Racing	Ford
71	Dave Marcis	Marcis Auto Racing	Chevrolet
75	Todd Bodine	Butch Mock Motorsports	Ford
76	Johnny Chapman	RaDiUs Motorsports	Ford
77	Davy Jones (R)	Jasper Motorsports	Ford
78	Pancho Carter	Triad Motorsports	Ford
81	Kenny Wallace	FILMAR Racing	Ford
87	Joe Nemechek	NEMCO Motorsports	Chevrolet
90	Mike Wallace	Donlavey Racing	Ford
94	Bill Elliott	Elliott-Hardy Racing	Ford
98	Jeremy Mayfield	Cale Yarborough Motorsports	Ford

== Qualifying ==
Qualifying was split into two rounds. The first round was held on Friday, March 10, at 12:30 PM EST. Each driver would have one lap to set a time. During the first round, the top 20 drivers in the round would be guaranteed a starting spot in the race. If a driver was not able to guarantee a spot in the first round, they had the option to scrub their time from the first round and try and run a faster lap time in a second round qualifying run, held on Saturday, March 11, at 11:00 AM EST. As with the first round, each driver would have one lap to set a time. For this specific race, positions 21-38 would be decided on time, and depending on who needed it, a select amount of positions were given to cars who had not otherwise qualified but were high enough in owner's points; up to four provisionals were given. If needed, a past champion who did not qualify on either time or provisionals could use a champion's provisional, adding one more spot to the field.

Dale Earnhardt, driving for Richard Childress Racing, won the pole, setting a time of 29.605 and an average speed of 185.077 mph (297.853 km/h) in the first round.

Eight cars would fail to qualify.

=== Full qualifying results ===
Pos.	#	Driver	Team	Make	Time	Speed
1	3	Dale Earnhardt	Richard Childress Racing	Chevrolet	29.605	185.077
2	18	Bobby Labonte	Joe Gibbs Racing	Chevrolet	29.610	185.046
3	24	Jeff Gordon	Hendrick Motorsports	Chevrolet	29.705	184.454
4	17	Darrell Waltrip	Darrell Waltrip Motorsports	Chevrolet	29.728	184.311
5	5	Terry Labonte	Hendrick Motorsports	Chevrolet	29.824	183.718
6	10	Ricky Rudd	Rudd Performance Motorsports	Ford	29.836	183.644
7	4	Sterling Marlin	Morgan–McClure Motorsports	Chevrolet	29.839	183.625
8	12	Derrike Cope	Bobby Allison Motorsports	Ford	29.848	183.570
9	43	Bobby Hamilton	Petty Enterprises	Pontiac	29.858	183.509
10	15	Dick Trickle	Bud Moore Engineering	Ford	29.865	183.466
11	32	Jimmy Hensley	Active Motorsports	Chevrolet	29.933	183.049
12	2	Rusty Wallace	Penske Racing South	Ford	29.970	182.823
13	6	Mark Martin	Roush Racing	Ford	29.978	182.774
14	98	Jeremy Mayfield	Cale Yarborough Motorsports	Ford	29.990	182.701
15	37	John Andretti	Kranefuss-Haas Racing	Ford	30.028	182.470
16	29	Steve Grissom	Diamond Ridge Motorsports	Chevrolet	30.072	182.203
17	21	Morgan Shepherd	Wood Brothers Racing	Ford	30.074	182.191
18	28	Dale Jarrett	Robert Yates Racing	Ford	30.083	182.136
19	1	Rick Mast	Precision Products Racing	Ford	30.113	181.955
20	87	Joe Nemechek	NEMCO Motorsports	Chevrolet	30.120	181.912
Failed to lock in Round 1
21	9	Lake Speed	Melling Racing	Ford	30.073	182.197
22	44	Jeff Purvis	Phoenix Racing	Chevrolet	30.122	181.900
23	26	Steve Kinser	King Racing	Ford	30.133	181.834
24	40	Greg Sacks	Team SABCO	Pontiac	30.137	181.810
25	77	Davy Jones (R)	Jasper Motorsports	Ford	30.137	181.810
26	90	Mike Wallace	Donlavey Racing	Ford	30.139	181.798
27	16	Ted Musgrave	Roush Racing	Ford	30.173	181.593
28	8	Jeff Burton	Stavola Brothers Racing	Ford	30.173	181.593
29	25	Ken Schrader	Hendrick Motorsports	Chevrolet	30.179	181.557
30	33	Robert Pressley (R)	Leo Jackson Motorsports	Chevrolet	30.236	181.214
31	11	Brett Bodine	Junior Johnson & Associates	Ford	30.238	181.202
32	41	Ricky Craven (R)	Larry Hedrick Motorsports	Chevrolet	30.240	181.190
33	71	Dave Marcis	Marcis Auto Racing	Chevrolet	30.251	181.125
34	7	Geoff Bodine	Geoff Bodine Racing	Ford	30.262	181.059
35	94	Bill Elliott	Elliott-Hardy Racing	Ford	30.277	180.969
36	47	Billy Standridge	Johnson Standridge Racing	Ford	30.344	180.569
37	75	Todd Bodine	Butch Mock Motorsports	Ford	30.370	180.415
38	19	Phil Parsons	TriStar Motorsports	Ford	30.378	180.367
Provisionals
39	30	Michael Waltrip	Bahari Racing	Pontiac	-*	-*
40	42	Kyle Petty	Team SABCO	Pontiac	-*	-*
41	22	Randy LaJoie (R)	Bill Davis Racing	Pontiac	-*	-*
42	23	Jimmy Spencer	Travis Carter Enterprises	Ford	-*	-*
Failed to qualify
43	31	Ward Burton	TriStar Motorsports	Chevrolet	-*	-*
44	52	Gary Bradberry	Jimmy Means Racing	Ford	-*	-*
45	27	Loy Allen Jr.	Junior Johnson & Associates	Ford	-*	-*
46	67	Ken Bouchard	Cunningham Racing	Ford	-*	-*
47	76	Johnny Chapman	RaDiUs Motorsports	Ford	-*	-*
48	66	Ben Hess	RaDiUs Motorsports	Ford	-*	-*
49	81	Kenny Wallace	FILMAR Racing	Ford	-*	-*
50	78	Pancho Carter	Triad Motorsports	Ford	-*	-*
Official first round qualifying results
Official starting lineup

== Race results ==
Fin	St	#	Driver	Team	Make	Laps	Led	Status	Pts	Winnings
1	3	24	Jeff Gordon	Hendrick Motorsports	Chevrolet	328	250	running	185	$104,950
2	2	18	Bobby Labonte	Joe Gibbs Racing	Chevrolet	328	7	running	175	$50,000
3	5	5	Terry Labonte	Hendrick Motorsports	Chevrolet	328	2	running	170	$44,150
4	1	3	Dale Earnhardt	Richard Childress Racing	Chevrolet	328	62	running	165	$52,950
5	18	28	Dale Jarrett	Robert Yates Racing	Ford	327	0	running	155	$33,725
6	17	21	Morgan Shepherd	Wood Brothers Racing	Ford	327	0	running	150	$24,950
7	7	4	Sterling Marlin	Morgan–McClure Motorsports	Chevrolet	327	0	running	146	$27,200
8	6	10	Ricky Rudd	Rudd Performance Motorsports	Ford	327	0	running	142	$26,200
9	13	6	Mark Martin	Roush Racing	Ford	326	0	running	138	$26,500
10	12	2	Rusty Wallace	Penske Racing South	Ford	326	0	running	134	$28,100
11	19	1	Rick Mast	Precision Products Racing	Ford	326	0	running	130	$20,870
12	32	41	Ricky Craven (R)	Larry Hedrick Motorsports	Chevrolet	325	0	running	127	$18,350
13	8	12	Derrike Cope	Bobby Allison Motorsports	Ford	325	0	running	124	$15,030
14	40	42	Kyle Petty	Team SABCO	Pontiac	325	1	running	126	$19,360
15	21	9	Lake Speed	Melling Racing	Ford	324	0	running	118	$11,580
16	20	87	Joe Nemechek	NEMCO Motorsports	Chevrolet	324	0	running	115	$10,320
17	9	43	Bobby Hamilton	Petty Enterprises	Pontiac	324	0	running	112	$14,310
18	16	29	Steve Grissom	Diamond Ridge Motorsports	Chevrolet	324	0	running	109	$14,090
19	27	16	Ted Musgrave	Roush Racing	Ford	323	0	running	106	$18,780
20	15	37	John Andretti	Kranefuss-Haas Racing	Ford	323	0	running	103	$11,060
21	37	75	Todd Bodine	Butch Mock Motorsports	Ford	323	0	running	100	$18,450
22	10	15	Dick Trickle	Bud Moore Engineering	Ford	322	0	running	97	$18,290
23	31	11	Brett Bodine	Junior Johnson & Associates	Ford	322	0	running	94	$22,580
24	25	77	Davy Jones (R)	Jasper Motorsports	Ford	320	0	running	91	$13,445
25	36	47	Billy Standridge	Johnson Standridge Racing	Ford	307	0	running	88	$9,540
26	35	94	Bill Elliott	Elliott-Hardy Racing	Ford	302	0	engine	85	$9,285
27	29	25	Ken Schrader	Hendrick Motorsports	Chevrolet	298	4	crash	87	$17,575
28	33	71	Dave Marcis	Marcis Auto Racing	Chevrolet	296	0	running	79	$9,100
29	24	40	Greg Sacks	Team SABCO	Pontiac	272	0	engine	76	$17,285
30	34	7	Geoff Bodine	Geoff Bodine Racing	Ford	263	0	handling	73	$23,450
31	30	33	Robert Pressley (R)	Leo Jackson Motorsports	Chevrolet	258	0	running	70	$16,990
32	42	23	Jimmy Spencer	Travis Carter Enterprises	Ford	248	0	running	67	$11,830
33	28	8	Jeff Burton	Stavola Brothers Racing	Ford	191	0	engine	64	$16,635
34	4	17	Darrell Waltrip	Darrell Waltrip Motorsports	Chevrolet	187	2	engine	66	$16,600
35	39	30	Michael Waltrip	Bahari Racing	Pontiac	147	0	crash	58	$16,065
36	14	98	Jeremy Mayfield	Cale Yarborough Motorsports	Ford	146	0	crash	55	$8,540
37	22	44	Jeff Purvis	Phoenix Racing	Chevrolet	146	0	crash	52	$8,525
38	11	32	Jimmy Hensley	Active Motorsports	Chevrolet	93	0	engine	49	$8,445
39	41	22	Randy LaJoie (R)	Bill Davis Racing	Pontiac	67	0	engine	46	$13,445
40	26	90	Mike Wallace	Donlavey Racing	Ford	33	0	engine	43	$9,445
41	23	26	Steve Kinser	King Racing	Ford	9	0	crash	40	$13,445
42	38	19	Phil Parsons	TriStar Motorsports	Ford	9	0	crash	37	$8,445
Official race results

Previous race: 1995 Pontiac Excitement 400	NASCAR Winston Cup Series; 1995 season	Next race: 1995 TranSouth Financial 400
