= 1995 Pontiac Excitement 400 =

Third race of the 1995 NASCAR Winston Cup Series

Race details
- Race 3 of 31 in the 1995 NASCAR Winston Cup Series
- The 1995 Pontiac Excitement 400 program cover.
- Date: March 5, 1995
- Official name: 41st Annual Pontiac Excitement 400
- Location: Richmond, Virginia, Richmond International Raceway
- Course: Permanent racing facility
- Course length: 0.75 miles (1.21 km)
- Distance: 400 laps, 300 mi (482.803 km)
- Scheduled distance: 400 laps, 300 mi (482.803 km)
- Average speed: 106.425 miles per hour (171.274 km/h)

Pole position
Driver	Jeff Gordon	Hendrick Motorsports
- Time: 21.642

Most laps led
Driver	Rusty Wallace	Penske Racing South
- Laps: 248

Winner
No. 5	Terry Labonte	Hendrick Motorsports

Television in the United States
- Network: TBS
- Announcers: Ken Squier, Ernie Irvan, Chuck Bown

Radio in the United States
- Radio: Motor Racing Network

The 1995 Pontiac Excitement 400 was the third stock car race of the 1995 NASCAR Winston Cup Series and the 41st iteration of the event. The race was held on Sunday, March 5, 1995, in Richmond, Virginia, at Richmond International Raceway, a 0.75 miles (1.21 km) D-shaped oval. The race took the scheduled 400 laps to complete. At race's end, Hendrick Motorsports driver Terry Labonte would manage to dominate the final stages of the race to take his 15th career NASCAR Winston Cup Series victory and his first victory of the season. To fill out the top three, Richard Childress Racing driver Dale Earnhardt and Penske Racing South driver Rusty Wallace would finish second and third, respectively.

== Background ==
The layout of Richmond International Raceway, the venue where the race was at.

Richmond International Raceway (RIR) is a 3/4-mile (1.2 km), D-shaped, asphalt race track located just outside Richmond, Virginia in Henrico County. Known as "America's premier short track".

=== Entry list ===
- (R) denotes rookie driver.

#	Driver	Team	Make
1	Rick Mast	Precision Products Racing	Pontiac
2	Rusty Wallace	Penske Racing South	Ford
3	Dale Earnhardt	Richard Childress Racing	Chevrolet
4	Sterling Marlin	Morgan–McClure Motorsports	Chevrolet
5	Terry Labonte	Hendrick Motorsports	Chevrolet
6	Mark Martin	Roush Racing	Ford
7	Geoff Bodine	Geoff Bodine Racing	Ford
8	Jeff Burton	Stavola Brothers Racing	Ford
9	Lake Speed	Melling Racing	Ford
10	Ricky Rudd	Rudd Performance Motorsports	Ford
11	Brett Bodine	Brett Bodine Racing	Ford
12	Derrike Cope	Bobby Allison Motorsports	Ford
15	Dick Trickle	Bud Moore Engineering	Ford
16	Ted Musgrave	Roush Racing	Ford
17	Darrell Waltrip	Darrell Waltrip Motorsports	Chevrolet
18	Bobby Labonte	Joe Gibbs Racing	Chevrolet
21	Morgan Shepherd	Wood Brothers Racing	Ford
22	Randy LaJoie (R)	Bill Davis Racing	Pontiac
23	Jimmy Spencer	Haas-Carter Motorsports	Ford
24	Jeff Gordon	Hendrick Motorsports	Chevrolet
25	Ken Schrader	Hendrick Motorsports	Chevrolet
26	Steve Kinser	King Racing	Ford
27	Loy Allen Jr.	Junior Johnson & Associates	Ford
28	Dale Jarrett	Robert Yates Racing	Ford
29	Steve Grissom	Diamond Ridge Motorsports	Chevrolet
30	Michael Waltrip	Bahari Racing	Pontiac
31	Ward Burton	A.G. Dillard Motorsports	Chevrolet
32	Jimmy Hensley	Active Motorsports	Chevrolet
33	Robert Pressley (R)	Leo Jackson Motorsports	Chevrolet
37	John Andretti	Kranefuss-Haas Racing	Ford
40	Greg Sacks	Dick Brooks Racing	Pontiac
41	Ricky Craven (R)	Larry Hedrick Motorsports	Chevrolet
42	Kyle Petty	Team SABCO	Pontiac
43	Bobby Hamilton	Petty Enterprises	Pontiac
47	Billy Standridge	Standridge Motorsports	Ford
49	Eric Smith	Smith Racing	Ford
52	Gary Bradberry	Jimmy Means Racing	Ford
66	Ben Hess	RaDiUs Motorsports	Ford
71	Dave Marcis	Marcis Auto Racing	Chevrolet
75	Todd Bodine	Butch Mock Motorsports	Ford
77	Davy Jones (R)	Jasper Motorsports	Ford
78	Jay Hedgecock	Triad Motorsports	Ford
81	Kenny Wallace	FILMAR Racing	Ford
87	Joe Nemechek	NEMCO Motorsports	Chevrolet
90	Mike Wallace	Donlavey Racing	Ford
94	Bill Elliott	Elliott-Hardy Racing	Ford
98	Jeremy Mayfield	Cale Yarborough Motorsports	Ford

== Qualifying ==
Qualifying was originally scheduled to be split into two rounds. The first round was scheduled to be held on Friday, March 3, at 10:30 AM EST. However, qualifying was snowed out and postponed until Saturday, March 4, at 12:00 PM EST. Qualifying was eventually combined into only one round. Each driver would have one lap to set a time. For this specific race, positions 1-34 would be decided on time, and depending on who needed it, a select amount of positions were given to cars who had not otherwise qualified but were high enough in owner's points; which is usually four.

Jeff Gordon, driving for Hendrick Motorsports, would win the pole, setting a time of 21.642 and an average speed of 124.757 miles per hour (200.777 km/h).

Nine drivers would fail to qualify: Jimmy Hensley, Kenny Wallace, Billy Standridge, Jay Hedgecock, Steve Grissom, Gary Bradberry, Ben Hess, Eric Smith, and Davy Jones.

=== Full qualifying results ===
Pos.	#	Driver	Team	Make	Time	Speed
1	24	Jeff Gordon	Hendrick Motorsports	Chevrolet	21.642	124.757
2	43	Bobby Hamilton	Petty Enterprises	Pontiac	21.730	124.252
3	2	Rusty Wallace	Penske Racing South	Ford	21.822	123.728
4	16	Ted Musgrave	Roush Racing	Ford	21.826	123.706
5	12	Derrike Cope	Bobby Allison Motorsports	Ford	21.854	123.547
6	25	Ken Schrader	Hendrick Motorsports	Chevrolet	21.880	123.400
7	15	Dick Trickle	Bud Moore Engineering	Ford	21.881	123.395
8	4	Sterling Marlin	Morgan–McClure Motorsports	Chevrolet	21.898	123.299
9	6	Mark Martin	Roush Racing	Ford	21.904	123.265
10	9	Lake Speed	Melling Racing	Ford	21.905	123.260
11	33	Robert Pressley (R)	Leo Jackson Motorsports	Chevrolet	21.926	123.141
12	1	Rick Mast	Precision Products Racing	Ford	21.934	123.097
13	28	Dale Jarrett	Robert Yates Racing	Ford	21.939	123.069
14	21	Morgan Shepherd	Wood Brothers Racing	Ford	21.968	122.906
15	11	Brett Bodine	Brett Bodine Racing	Ford	21.976	122.861
16	90	Mike Wallace	Donlavey Racing	Ford	22.047	122.466
17	17	Darrell Waltrip	Darrell Waltrip Motorsports	Chevrolet	22.087	122.244
18	18	Bobby Labonte	Joe Gibbs Racing	Chevrolet	22.095	122.200
19	42	Kyle Petty	Team SABCO	Pontiac	22.098	122.183
20	7	Geoff Bodine	Geoff Bodine Racing	Ford	22.130	122.006
21	37	John Andretti	Kranefuss-Haas Racing	Ford	22.132	121.995
22	8	Jeff Burton	Stavola Brothers Racing	Ford	22.135	121.979
23	23	Jimmy Spencer	Travis Carter Enterprises	Ford	22.147	121.913
24	5	Terry Labonte	Hendrick Motorsports	Chevrolet	22.158	121.852
25	94	Bill Elliott	Elliott-Hardy Racing	Ford	22.177	121.748
26	3	Dale Earnhardt	Richard Childress Racing	Chevrolet	22.186	121.698
27	40	Greg Sacks	Dick Brooks Racing	Pontiac	22.201	121.616
28	98	Jeremy Mayfield	Cale Yarborough Motorsports	Ford	22.215	121.540
29	71	Dave Marcis	Marcis Auto Racing	Chevrolet	22.223	121.496
30	10	Ricky Rudd	Rudd Performance Motorsports	Ford	22.260	121.294
31	41	Ricky Craven (R)	Larry Hedrick Motorsports	Chevrolet	22.261	121.288
32	75	Todd Bodine	Butch Mock Motorsports	Ford	22.270	121.239
33	31	Ward Burton	A.G. Dillard Motorsports	Chevrolet	22.284	121.163
34	87	Joe Nemechek	NEMCO Motorsports	Chevrolet	22.350	120.805
Provisionals
35	30	Michael Waltrip	Bahari Racing	Pontiac	-*	-*
36	26	Steve Kinser	King Racing	Ford	-*	-*
37	22	Randy LaJoie (R)	Bill Davis Racing	Pontiac	-*	-*
38	27	Loy Allen Jr.	Junior Johnson & Associates	Ford	-*	-*
Failed to qualify
39	32	Jimmy Hensley	Active Motorsports	Chevrolet	-*	-*
40	81	Kenny Wallace	FILMAR Racing	Ford	-*	-*
41	47	Billy Standridge	Standridge Motorsports	Ford	-*	-*
42	78	Jay Hedgecock	Triad Motorsports	Ford	-*	-*
43	29	Steve Grissom	Diamond Ridge Motorsports	Chevrolet	-*	-*
44	52	Gary Bradberry	Jimmy Means Racing	Ford	-*	-*
45	66	Ben Hess	RaDiUs Motorsports	Ford	-*	-*
46	49	Eric Smith	Smith Racing	Ford	-*	-*
47	77	Davy Jones (R)	Jasper Motorsports	Ford	-*	-*
Official starting lineup

== Race results ==
Fin	St	#	Driver	Team	Make	Laps	Led	Status	Pts	Winnings
1	24	5	Terry Labonte	Hendrick Motorsports	Chevrolet	400	131	running	180	$82,950
2	26	3	Dale Earnhardt	Richard Childress Racing	Chevrolet	400	11	running	175	$57,200
3	3	2	Rusty Wallace	Penske Racing South	Ford	400	248	running	175	$29,600
4	6	25	Ken Schrader	Hendrick Motorsports	Chevrolet	400	0	running	160	$31,100
5	8	4	Sterling Marlin	Morgan–McClure Motorsports	Chevrolet	400	0	running	155	$34,400
6	5	12	Derrike Cope	Bobby Allison Motorsports	Ford	400	2	running	155	$23,900
7	17	17	Darrell Waltrip	Darrell Waltrip Motorsports	Chevrolet	400	0	running	146	$21,875
8	9	6	Mark Martin	Roush Racing	Ford	399	0	running	142	$26,075
9	2	43	Bobby Hamilton	Petty Enterprises	Pontiac	399	0	running	138	$11,875
10	21	37	John Andretti	Kranefuss-Haas Racing	Ford	399	7	running	139	$13,925
11	20	7	Geoff Bodine	Geoff Bodine Racing	Ford	398	0	running	130	$25,575
12	7	15	Dick Trickle	Bud Moore Engineering	Ford	398	0	running	127	$20,175
13	4	16	Ted Musgrave	Roush Racing	Ford	398	0	running	124	$20,025
14	10	9	Lake Speed	Melling Racing	Ford	397	0	running	121	$10,625
15	14	21	Morgan Shepherd	Wood Brothers Racing	Ford	397	0	running	118	$20,335
16	25	94	Bill Elliott	Elliott-Hardy Racing	Ford	397	0	running	115	$10,400
17	28	98	Jeremy Mayfield	Cale Yarborough Motorsports	Ford	397	0	running	112	$10,300
18	15	11	Brett Bodine	Brett Bodine Racing	Ford	397	0	running	109	$23,250
19	27	40	Greg Sacks	Dick Brooks Racing	Pontiac	396	0	running	106	$19,325
20	29	71	Dave Marcis	Marcis Auto Racing	Chevrolet	395	0	running	103	$11,700
21	30	10	Ricky Rudd	Rudd Performance Motorsports	Ford	395	0	running	100	$23,150
22	33	31	Ward Burton	A.G. Dillard Motorsports	Chevrolet	395	0	running	97	$10,125
23	35	30	Michael Waltrip	Bahari Racing	Pontiac	395	0	running	94	$19,050
24	23	23	Jimmy Spencer	Travis Carter Enterprises	Ford	393	0	running	91	$13,825
25	13	28	Dale Jarrett	Robert Yates Racing	Ford	393	0	running	88	$24,375
26	16	90	Mike Wallace	Donlavey Racing	Ford	393	0	running	85	$9,950
27	37	22	Randy LaJoie (R)	Bill Davis Racing	Pontiac	392	0	running	82	$19,625
28	36	26	Steve Kinser	King Racing	Ford	391	0	running	79	$19,000
29	38	27	Loy Allen Jr.	Junior Johnson & Associates	Ford	389	0	running	76	$17,875
30	18	18	Bobby Labonte	Joe Gibbs Racing	Chevrolet	388	0	transmission	73	$18,345
31	22	8	Jeff Burton	Stavola Brothers Racing	Ford	378	0	running	70	$18,200
32	34	87	Joe Nemechek	NEMCO Motorsports	Chevrolet	375	0	running	67	$9,775
33	19	42	Kyle Petty	Team SABCO	Pontiac	374	0	running	64	$18,060
34	12	1	Rick Mast	Precision Products Racing	Ford	302	0	engine	61	$17,950
35	11	33	Robert Pressley (R)	Leo Jackson Motorsports	Chevrolet	266	0	crash	58	$18,350
36	1	24	Jeff Gordon	Hendrick Motorsports	Chevrolet	183	1	fuel pump	60	$28,750
37	32	75	Todd Bodine	Butch Mock Motorsports	Ford	148	0	crash	52	$17,750
38	31	41	Ricky Craven (R)	Larry Hedrick Motorsports	Chevrolet	141	0	engine	49	$12,750
Official race results

Previous race: 1995 Goodwrench 500	NASCAR Winston Cup Series; 1995 season	Next race: 1995 Purolator 500
