= Ervin Pruitt =

Racecar driver from South Carolina

- Born: May 11, 1940 (age 86); Spartanburg, South Carolina, U.S.

NASCAR Cup Series career
- 9 races run over 2 years
- Best finish: 64th – 1969 NASCAR Grand National Series season
- First race: 1968 Volunteer 500 (Bristol International Speedway)
- Last race: 1969 Pickens 200 (Greenville-Pickens Speedway)
| Wins | Top tens | Poles |
|---|---|---|
| 0 | 2 | 0 |

Ervin Pruitt (born May 11, 1940) is a retired NASCAR Grand National Series driver who competed in 1968 and 1969 exclusively.

== Career ==
=== As a driver ===
Pruitt has completely 1,941 laps without leading a single one of them; the equivalent of 1,136.6 miles or 1,829.2 kilometres of racing constantly on a paved highway. While starting an average of 23rd place, Pruitt has generally improved his performance in the races by finishing an average of 18th place. Pruitt has raced primarily on short tracks; only racing on intermediate tracks and restrictor plate tracks only once apiece.

Pruitt's primary stock car vehicle is the #57 Dodge machine owned by himself and without a permanent sponsor. During his career, Pruitt brought home $2,780 in total career winnings ($24,406.99 when adjusted for inflation).

=== As an owner ===
As a NASCAR team owner, Pruitt has employed legendary NASCAR superstars like Neil Castles, Charlie Glotzbach, James Hylton, Roy Tyner, and Frank Warren. His record while managing a NASCAR team includes two finishes in the "top-five" and five finishes in the "top-ten." Stock car racing vehicles under Pruitt's command received an average start of 24th place leading up to an average finish of 21st place. These vehicles also raced 9778 laps of top-level stock car racing; while leading only 16 of them.
