= Walson Gardener =

American NASCAR driver (1932–1984)

- Born: August 21, 1932; Laurinburg, North Carolina
- Died: April 10, 1984 (aged 51); Massachusetts, U.S.

NASCAR Cup Series career
- 24 races run over 4 years
- Best finish: 40th - 1968 Grand National Season
- First race: 1965 untitled race (Smoky Mountain Raceway)
- Last race: 1969 Volunteer 500 (Bristol International Speedway)
Wins	Top tens	Poles
0	2	0

William Walson Gardener (August 21, 1932 – April 10, 1984) was an American NASCAR Grand National driver and a competitor at the 1968 Fireball 300. Gardener has had two finishes in the top-ten, 4953 laps of racing experience - the equivalent of 2,915.1 miles (4,691.4 km), a total career earnings of $6740, an average start of 25th, an average finish of 20th, and four years (24 races) of track experience. His best race was the 1968 Western North Carolina 500 where he finished in eighth place and accumulated ($5,092.11 when adjusted for inflation) in prize winnings after finishing 438 laps out of the 500 laps of that particular race. Gardener died in Massachusetts on April 10, 1984, at the age of 51.
