= 1968 Western North Carolina 500 =

Auto race held at Asheville-Weaverville Speedway in 1968

Race details
- Race 36 of 49 in the 1968 NASCAR Grand National Series season
- 1968 Western North Carolina 500 program cover
- Date: August 18, 1968; 57 years ago
- Official name: Western North Carolina 500
- Location: Asheville-Weaverville Speedway, Weaverville, North Carolina
- Course: Permanent racing facility
- Course length: 0.500 miles (0.804 km)
- Distance: 500 laps, 250 mi (402 km)
- Weather: Very hot with temperatures of 87.1 °F (30.6 °C); wind speeds of 10.1 miles per hour (16.3 km/h)
- Average speed: 73.686 miles per hour (118.586 km/h)

Pole position
Driver	Darel Dieringer	Mario Rossi

Most laps led
Driver	David Pearson	Holman-Moody
- Laps: 456

Winner
No. 17	David Pearson	Holman-Moody

Television in the United States
- Network: untelevised
- Announcers: none

The 1968 Western North Carolina 500 was a NASCAR Grand National Series event that was held on August 18, 1968, at Asheville-Weaverville Speedway in Weaverville, North Carolina.

Ervin Pruitt would score his best career finish at this event.

== Race report ==
Five hundred laps took place on a paved oval track spanning 0.500 miles (0.805 km). The race took three hours and twenty-three minutes to finish. Seven cautions were handed out by NASCAR for ninety laps. David Pearson (with a Holman-Moody owned vehicle) defeated Bobby Isaac (in his Nord Krauskopf-owned vehicle) by more than three laps. Notable speeds were: 73.686 miles per hour (118.586 km/h) for the average speed and 88.409 miles per hour (142.280 km/h) for the pole position speed (accomplished by Darel Dieringer using a vehicle owned by Mr. Mario Rossi). Ten thousand and five hundred stock car racing fans attended this live event. Out of twenty-nine American drivers, only nine of them finished the race in a timely manner. Notable names included: J.D. McDuffie, Richard Petty, Elmo Langley, Roy Tyner, and Wendell Scott.

John Sears went over the guard rail and end over end to terminate his night.

The vehicle used by the winner was a 1968 Ford Torino machine homologated for use by the general public but modified to increase both speed and safety. A prize amount of $2,150 ($19,906 when adjusted for inflation) was given out to the winner of the race while last place paid out $150 ($1,389 when adjusted for inflation) for only fifteen laps of work by driver G.C. Spencer. When all the winnings for this racing event are consolidated together, the total prize purse was $13,485 ($124,849 when adjusted for inflation).

The transition to purpose-built racecars began in the early 1960s and occurred gradually over that decade. Changes made to the sport by the late 1960s brought an end to the "strictly stock" vehicles of the 1950s.

=== Qualifying ===
Grid	No.	Driver	Manufacturer
1	22	Darel Dieringer	'68 Plymouth
2	17	David Pearson	'68 Ford
3	43	Richard Petty	'68 Plymouth
4	99	Paul Goldsmith	'68 Dodge
5	71	Bobby Isaac	'67 Dodge
6	1	Pete Hamilton	'68 Dodge
7	48	James Hylton	'68 Dodge
8	4	John Sears	'67 Ford
9	49	G.C. Spencer	'67 Plymouth
10	08	Bob Burcham	'66 Chevrolet
11	2	Bobby Allison	'66 Chevrolet
12	64	Elmo Langley	'66 Ford
13	76	Tiny Lund	'66 Ford
14	28	Earl Brooks	'66 Ford
15	57	Ervin Pruitt	'67 Dodge
16	20	Clyde Lynn	'66 Ford
17	51	Stan Meserve	'67 Dodge
18	9	Roy Tyner	'67 Pontiac
19	70	J.D. McDuffie	'67 Buick
20	06	Neil Castles	'67 Plymouth
21	8	Ed Negre	'67 Ford
22	45	Bill Seifert	'68 Ford
23	34	Wendell Scott	'66 Ford
24	93	Walson Gardner	'67 Ford
25	50	Eddie Yarboro	'66 Plymouth
26	25	Jabe Thomas	'67 Ford
27	38	Wayne Smith	'68 Chevrolet
28	01	Paul Dean Holt	'67 Ford
29	88	George England	'67 Oldsmobile

== Finishing order ==
Section reference:

1. David Pearson (No. 17)
2. Bobby Isaac (No. 71)
3. Neil Castles (No. 06)
4. Roy Tyner (No. 9)
5. Bill Seifert (No. 45)
6. Jabe Thomas (No. 25)
7. Ervin Pruett (No. 57)
8. Walson Gardener (No. 93)
9. Wendell Scott (No. 34)
10. Pete Hamilton* (No. 1)
11. Paul Dean Holt* (No. 01)
12. Bobby Allison* (No. 2)
13. Eddie Yarboro* (No. 50)
14. George England* (No. 88)
15. Ed Negre* (No. 8)
16. Elmo Langley* (No. 64)
17. Paul Goldsmith* (No. 99)
18. James Hylton* (No. 48)
19. Bob Burcham* (No. 08)
20. Earl Brooks* (No. 28)
21. Clyde Lynn* (No. 20)
22. Darel Dieringer* (No. 22)
23. Tiny Lund* (No. 76)
24. Stan Meserve* (No. 51)
25. J.D. McDuffie* (No. 70)
26. Richard Petty* (No. 43)
27. Wayne Smith* (No. 38)
28. John Sears* (No. 4)
29. G.C. Spencer* (No. 49)

* Driver failed to finish race

== Timeline ==
Section reference:

- Start of race: Darel Dieringer began the event with the pole position.
- Lap 3: David Pearson took over the lead from Darel Dieringer.
- Lap 14: Engine issues forced G.C. Spencer out of the race.
- Lap 33: John Sears had problems with his vehicle's engine, forcing him to exit the race.
- Lap 35: Wayne Smith's driveshaft stopped working properly.
- Lap 40: Paul Goldsmith took over the lead from David Pearson.
- Lap 52: A frame came off Richard Petty's vehicle, forcing his exit for safety reasons.
- Lap 56: J.D. McDuffie's engine stopped working properly.
- Lap 64: David Pearson took over the lead from Paul Goldsmith.
- Lap 91: Stan Meserve managed to overheat his vehicle.
- Lap 93: Vibration issues ended up giving Tiny Lund some "bad vibrations," forcing his exit from the track.
- Lap 119: Engine issues forced Darel Dieringer out of the event.
- Lap 129: Paul Goldsmith took over the lead from David Pearson.
- Lap 132: Engine issues forced Clyde Lynn to leave the event sooner than he planned to.
- Lap 136: Earl Brooks had a terminal crash, forcing himself to retire from the race.
- Lap 146: David Pearson took over the lead from Paul Goldsmith.
- Lap 148: Bobby Isaac took over the lead from David Pearson.
- Lap 149: David Pearson took over the lead from Bobby Isaac.
- Finish: David Pearson was officially declared the winner of the event.

Preceded by 1968 Myers Brothers 250	NASCAR Grand National Season; 1968	Succeeded by 1968 untitled race at South Boston Speedway
