= 1968 Volunteer 500 =

Auto race held at Bristol International Speedway in 1968

Race details
- Race 30 of 49 in the 1968 NASCAR Grand National Series season
- Layout of Bristol Motor Speedway
- Date: July 21, 1968
- Official name: Volunteer 500
- Location: Bristol International Speedway, Bristol, Tennessee
- Course: Permanent racing facility
- Course length: 0.857 km (0.533 miles)
- Distance: 500 laps, 266.5 mi (428.8 km)
- Weather: Extremely hot with temperatures of 93.0 °F (33.9 °C); wind speeds of 7 miles per hour (11 km/h)
- Average speed: 76.31 mph (122.81 km/h)
- Attendance: 20,000

Pole position
Driver	LeeRoy Yarbrough	Junior Johnson & Associates

Most laps led
Driver	David Pearson	Holman-Moody
- Laps: 257

Winner
No. 17	David Pearson	Holman-Moody

Television in the United States
- Network: untelevised
- Announcers: none

The 1968 Volunteer 500 was a NASCAR Grand National Series event that was held on July 21, 1968, at Bristol International Speedway in Bristol, Tennessee.

The transition to purpose-built racecars began in the early 1960s and occurred gradually over that decade. Changes made to the sport by the late 1960s brought an end to the "strictly stock" vehicles of the 1950s.

== Race report ==
There were 36 drivers on the racing grid as the green flag waved and the race was underway. It took three hours and sixteen minutes for David Pearson to defeat Cale Yarborough by one and a half laps in front of a live audience of twenty thousand racing fans; about the size of a small city. There were eight lead changes recorded in the NASCAR summary and 13 caution flags were waved for a grueling distance of 92 laps. There were 500 laps in this racing event; speeds of 76.31 miles per hour (122.81 km/h) were recorded during the race while solo qualifying runs would see LeeRoy Yarbrough earn the pole position by driving up to 87.421 miles per hour (140.690 km/h). Tiny Lund drove a red and silver 1967 Mercury Cyclone #16 vehicle to a respectable 13th-place finish.

Bob Burcham and Ervin Pruitt would make their respective introductions to NASCAR-style racing during this event. Richard Brickhouse ended up being the last-place finisher due to an engine malfunction on the eighth lap. Ford vehicles made up the majority of the racing grid. On lap 187, Dick Johnson would quit the reason for reasons unknown; his final race would be at the 1969 North State 200. Twelve notable crew chiefs participated in the race; including Junior Johnson, Harry Hyde, Dale Inman, Banjo Matthews, Glen Wood and Bud Moore.

Five years later, Swede Savage would be killed in a racing accident at the 1973 Indianapolis 500. The winner of this event received $5,175 in total winnings ($46,793 when adjusted for inflation) while the last-place finisher went home with only $250 in total earnings ($2,261 when adjusted for inflation). The total prize purse for this race was $24,140 ($218,276 when adjusted for inflation).

Considered to be the hottest temperatures for Tennessee during the late-1960s, people were passing out all over the place.

=== Qualifying ===
Grid	No.	Driver	Manufacturer	Owner
1	98	LeeRoy Yarbrough	'68 Ford	Junior Johnson
2	6	Charlie Glotzbach	'68 Dodge	Cotton Owens
3	29	Swede Savage	'68 Ford	Bondy Long
4	21	Cale Yarborough	'68 Mercury	Wood Brothers
5	27	Donnie Allison	'68 Ford	Banjo Matthews
6	17	David Pearson	'68 Ford	Holman-Moody Racing
7	99	Paul Goldsmith	'68 Dodge	Ray Nichels
8	43	Richard Petty	'68 Plymouth	Petty Enterprises
9	71	Bobby Isaac	'67 Dodge	Nord Krauskopf
10	3	Buddy Baker	'68 Dodge	Ray Fox
11	22	Darel Dieringer	'68 Plymouth	Mario Rossi
12	16	Tiny Lund	'68 Mercury	Bud Moore
13	5	Pete Hamilton	'68 Ford	Rocky Hinton
14	48	James Hylton	'67 Dodge	James Hylton
15	4	John Sears	'67 Ford	L.G. DeWitt
16	2	Bobby Allison	'66 Chevrolet	Donald Brackins
17	49	G.C. Spencer	'67 Plymouth	G.C. Spencer
18	39	Friday Hassler	'66 Chevrolet	Red Sharp
19	08	Bob Burcham	'66 Chevrolet	E.C. Reid
20	64	Elmo Langley	'66 Ford	Elmo Langley / Henry Woodfield
21	20	Clyde Lynn	'66 Ford	Clyde Lynn
22	28	Earl Brooks	'66 Ford	Earl Brooks
23	25	Jabe Thomas	'67 Ford	Don Robertson
24	06	Neil Castles	'67 Plymouth	Neil Castles
25	51	Stan Meserve	'67 Dodge	Margo Hamm

== Top 10 finishers ==
Pos	Grid	No.	Driver	Manufacturer	Laps	Winnings	Laps led	Time/Status
1	6	17	David Pearson	Ford	500	$5,175	257	3:16:34
2	4	21	Cale Yarborough	Mercury	499	$2,650	1	+1.5 laps
3	3	29	Swede Savage	Ford	498	$1,700	0	+2 laps
4	9	71	Bobby Isaac	Dodge	497	$900	0	+3 laps
5	18	39	Friday Hassler	Chevrolet	488	$800	0	+11 laps
6	10	3	Buddy Baker	Dodge	481	$700	0	Engine failure
7	24	06	Neil Castles	Plymouth	467	$650	0	+33 laps
8	12	16	Tiny Lund	Mercury	465	$625	0	Engine failure
9	32	45	Bill Seifert	Ford	464	$600	0	+36 laps
10	29	70	J.D. McDuffie	Buick	463	$525	0	+37 laps

== Timeline ==
Section reference:

- Start of race: Charlie Glotzbach had the pole position to begin the event.
- Lap 8: Richard Brickhouse managed to blow his engine while racing.
- Lap 35: James Hylton managed to blow his engine while racing.
- Lap 63: Donnie Allison managed to lose the rear end of his vehicle, he was pulled off the track for safety reasons.
- Lap 75: Pete Hamilton took over the lead from Charlie Glotzbach.
- Lap 81: Stan Meserve managed to lose the rear end of his vehicle, he was pulled off the track for safety reasons.
- Lap 86: David Pearson took over the lead from Pete Hamilton.
- Lap 114: Pete Hamilton took over the lead from David Pearson.
- Lap 117: Paul Goldsmith took over the lead from Pete Hamilton.
- Lap 120: LeeRoy Yarbrough managed to blow his engine while racing.
- Lap 135: G.C. Spencer managed to blow his engine while racing.
- Lap 143: Paul Dean Holt's vehicle had an oil leak, he was forced out of the race for safety reasons.
- Lap 176: Bob Burcham managed to blow his engine while he was racing.
- Lap 183: Cale Yarborough took over the lead from Paul Goldsmith.
- Lap 184: Paul Goldsmith took over the lead from Cale Yarborough.
- Lap 187: Dick Johnson quit the race.
- Lap 212: Bobby Allison's vehicle ran out of battery power while he was racing.
- Lap 272: David Pearson took over the lead from Paul Goldsmith.
- Lap 290: Paul Goldsmith managed to lose the rear end of his vehicle, he was pulled off the track for safety reasons.
- Lap 329: Pete Hamilton managed to blow his engine while racing.
- Lap 362: Walson Gardner managed to blow his engine while racing.
- Lap 385: Charlie Glotzbach managed to blow his engine while racing.
- Lap 387: Jabe Thomas had a terminal crash, forcing him out of the race.
- Lap 407: John Sears managed to lose the rear end of his vehicle, he was pulled off the track for safety reasons.
- Lap 465: Tiny Lund managed to blow his engine while racing.
- Lap 481: Buddy Baker managed to blow his engine while racing.
- Finish: David Pearson was officially declared the winner of the event.

Preceded by 1968 Northern 300	NASCAR Grand National Season; 1968	Succeeded by 1968 Smoky Mountain 200

Preceded by 1967	Volunteer 500 races 1968	Succeeded by 1969
