= Joe Booher =

American racing driver

- Born: February 22, 1941; West Lafayette, Indiana, U.S.
- Died: February 12, 1993 (aged 51); Daytona Beach, Florida, U.S.

NASCAR Cup Series career
- 21 races run over 14 years
- Best finish: 56th (1980)
- First race: 1978 Gwyn Staley 400 (North Carolina)
- Last race: 1988 Budweiser 500 (Delaware)
Wins	Top tens	Poles
0	0	0

Donald Joe Booher (February 22, 1941 – February 12, 1993) was an American NASCAR Winston Cup Series and Goody's Dash driver. He spent his time running a farming business when he was not racing. He was killed while competing in the 1993 Goody's Dash Cup season-opening Florida 200 at the Daytona International Speedway in Daytona Beach, Florida.

Prior to 1993, Booher had made 21 career starts in NASCAR's Winston Cup Series. He also competed in the ARCA stock car series. Broadcaster Bob Jenkins reported that during Daytona Speedweeks he often brought one of his cash crops, popcorn, to the media center for all to enjoy.

On February 12, 1993, Booher was competing in the Florida 200, the season opener of the NASCAR Goody's Dash Series for 4-cylinder compact cars. Running in mid-field during the second lap of the race, Booher's Chevrolet Beretta clipped the left front quarter panel of Carl Horton's Pontiac and went out of control. He then tagged the wall and was hit in the right front by Rodney White. The accident caused a brief red flag period before the race was restarted. White was in critical condition after suffering compression fractures of his vertebrae and was taken to Halifax Medical Center, but he survived and was not paralyzed. Horton was not hurt in the accident. After being taken to the same hospital, the 51-year-old Booher died of massive head and internal injuries.

== Motorsports career results ==
=== NASCAR ===
(key) (Bold – Pole position awarded by qualifying time. Italics – Pole position earned by points standings or practice time. * – Most laps led.)

==== Winston Cup Series ====
NASCAR Winston Cup Series results
Year	Team	No.	Make	1	2	3	4	5	6	7	8	9	10	11	12	13	14	15	16	17	18	19	20	21	22	23	24	25	26	27	28	29	30	31	NWCC	Pts	Ref
1975	Robertson Racing	25	Chevy	RSD	DAY; DNQ	RCH	CAR	BRI	ATL	NWS	DAR	MAR	TAL	NSV	DOV	CLT	RSD	MCH	DAY	NSV	POC	TAL	MCH	DAR	DOV	NWS	MAR	CLT	RCH	CAR	BRI	ATL	ONT		NA	-	
1977	Price Racing	45	Chevy	RSD	DAY; DNQ	RCH	CAR	ATL	NWS	DAR	BRI	MAR	TAL	NSV	DOV	CLT	RSD	MCH	DAY	NSV	POC	TAL	MCH	BRI	DAR	RCH	DOV	MAR	NWS	CLT	CAR	ATL	ONT		NA	-	
1978	Wawak Racing	74	Chevy	RSD	DAY	RCH	CAR	ATL	BRI	DAR	NWS; 16	MAR	TAL	DOV	CLT	NSV	RSD	MCH; 34	DAY	NSV															60th	273	
1978	Gray Racing	19	Chevy																		POC; 22	TAL	MCH	BRI	DAR	RCH	DOV	MAR	NWS	CLT	CAR	ATL	ONT		60th	273	
1980	Wawak Racing	74	Buick	RSD	DAY; 17			ATL; 35	BRI	DAR	NWS	MAR	TAL	NSV	DOV	CLT	TWS																		56th	294	
1980	Ulrich Racing	40	Chevy			RCH; 11	CAR																												56th	294	
1980	Warren Racing	79	Dodge															RSD; 19	MCH	DAY	NSV	POC	TAL	MCH	BRI	DAR	RCH							ONT; 34	56th	294	
1980	Wawak Racing	74	Chevy																									DOV; 16	NWS	MAR	CLT	CAR	ATL		56th	294	
1981	Ulrich Racing	40	Buick	RSD	DAY	RCH	CAR	ATL	BRI	NWS	DAR	MAR	TAL	NSV	DOV	CLT	TWS	RSD	MCH; 24	DAY	NSV	POC; 20		MCH; 22	BRI	DAR	RCH	DOV	MAR	NWS	CLT	CAR	ATL	RSD	82nd	97	
1981	Thomas Racing	25	Pontiac																				TAL; 42												82nd	97	
1982	Ulrich Racing	40	Buick	DAY; DNQ	RCH	BRI	ATL	CAR	DAR	NWS	MAR	TAL	NSV	DOV	CLT	POC	RSD	MCH	DAY	NSV	POC; 21	TAL	MCH; 18	BRI	DAR	RCH	DOV	NWS	CLT	MAR	CAR	ATL; DNQ	RSD		NA	-	
1983	Spohn Racing	65	Ford	DAY; DNQ	RCH	CAR	ATL	DAR	NWS	MAR	TAL	NSV	DOV	BRI	CLT	RSD	POC																		NA	-	
1983	Satterfield Racing	18	Buick															MCH; DNQ	DAY	NSV	POC	TAL	MCH; DNQ	BRI	DAR	RCH	DOV	MAR	NWS	CLT	CAR	ATL; 39	RSD		NA	-	
1984	Satterfield Racing	18	Buick	DAY; DNQ	RCH	CAR	ATL	BRI	NWS	DAR	MAR	TAL	NSV	DOV	CLT	RSD	POC	MCH	DAY	NSV	POC	TAL	MCH	BRI	DAR	RCH	DOV	MAR	CLT	NWS	CAR	ATL	RSD		NA	-	
1985	Booher Racing	65	Buick	DAY	RCH	CAR	ATL	BRI	DAR	NWS	MAR	TAL	DOV	CLT	RSD	POC	MCH	DAY	POC; 28	TAL															65th	170	
1985	Booher Racing	65	Chevy																		MCH; 24	BRI	DAR	RCH	DOV	MAR	NWS	CLT	CAR	ATL	RSD				65th	170	
1986	U.S. Racing	6	Chevy	DAY	RCH	CAR	ATL	BRI	DAR	NWS	MAR	TAL	DOV; 31	CLT	RSD	POC	MCH	DAY	POC	TAL	GLN					DOV; 18	MAR	NWS	CLT	CAR	ATL	RSD			71st	179	
1986	Jerry Holden Racing	68	Chevy																			MCH; DNQ	BRI	DAR	RCH										71st	179	
1987	Booher Racing	02	Pontiac	DAY; DNQ	CAR	RCH	ATL	DAR	NWS	BRI	MAR	TAL	CLT	DOV	POC	RSD	MCH	DAY	POC	TAL	GLN	MCH	BRI	DAR	RCH	DOV	MAR	NWS	CLT	CAR	RSD	ATL			NA	-	
1988	Booher Racing	02	Pontiac	DAY; DNQ	RCH	CAR	ATL	DAR	BRI	NWS	MAR	TAL	CLT																						87th	49	
1988	Booher Racing	41	Chevy											DOV; 38	RSD	POC	MCH	DAY	POC	TAL	GLN	MCH	BRI	DAR	RCH	DOV	MAR	CLT	NWS	CAR	PHO	ATL			87th	49	
1990	Booher Racing	29	Pontiac	DAY; DNQ	RCH	CAR	ATL	DAR	BRI	NWS	MAR	TAL	CLT	DOV	SON	POC	MCH	DAY	POC	TAL	GLN	MCH	BRI	DAR	RCH	DOV	MAR	NWS	CLT	CAR	PHO	ATL			NA	-	
1992	Nelson Malloch Racing	88	Pontiac	DAY; DNQ	CAR	RCH	ATL	DAR	BRI	NWS	MAR	TAL	CLT	DOV	SON	POC	MCH	DAY	POC	TAL	GLN	MCH	BRI	DAR	RCH	DOV	MAR	NWS	CLT	CAR	PHO	ATL			NA	-	

===== Daytona 500 =====
Year	Team	Manufacturer	Start	Finish
1975	Robertson Racing	Chevrolet	DNQ	
1977	Price Racing	Chevrolet	DNQ	
1980	Wawak Racing	Buick	28	17
1982	Ulrich Racing	Buick	DNQ	
1983	Spohn Racing	Ford	DNQ	
1984	Satterfield Racing	Buick	DNQ	
1987	Booher Racing	Pontiac	DNQ	
1988	Booher Racing	Pontiac	DNQ	
1990	Booher Racing	Pontiac	DNQ	
1992	Nelson Malloch Racing	Pontiac	DNQ	

=== ARCA SuperCar Series ===
(key) (Bold – Pole position awarded by qualifying time. Italics – Pole position earned by points standings or practice time. * – Most laps led.)

ARCA SuperCar Series results
Year	Team	No.	Make	1	2	3	4	5	6	7	8	9	10	11	12	13	14	15	16	17	18	19	20	21	ASCSC	Pts	Ref
1980		8	Olds	DAY; 10	NWS	FRS	FRS																		NA	-	
1980	Hollar Racing	92	Chevy					MCH; 20	TAL; 32	IMS	FRS	MCH													NA	-	
1981	Hollar Racing	9	Chevy	DAY; 22	DSP	FRS	FRS	BFS	TAL	FRS	COR														NA	-	
1984	Peterson Motorsports	06	Buick	DAY; 21	ATL	TAL	CSP	SMS	FRS	MCS	LCS	IRP	TAL	FRS	ISF	DSF	TOL	MGR							NA	-	
1985	Peterson Motorsports	06	Buick	ATL	DAY; 29	ATL; 35																			20th	-	
1985		41	Buick				TAL; 39	ATL; 40	SSP	IRP	CSP	FRS													20th	-	
1985		41	Olds										IRP; 26	OEF	ISF; 18	DSF	TOL								20th	-	
1986	Peterson Motorsports	06	Buick	ATL	DAY; 33	ATL; 33																			36th	-	
1986		91	Pontiac				TAL; 22	SIR	SSP	FRS	KIL	CSP													36th	-	
1986		15	Buick										TAL; 28	BLN	ISF	DSF	TOL	MCS	ATL						36th	-	
1988	Wallace Racing	02	Pontiac	DAY	ATL	TAL	FRS	PCS	ROC	POC	WIN	KIL	ACS	SLM	POC	TAL; 20	DEL	FRS	ISF	DSF	SLM	ATL			90th	-	
1989		20	Pontiac	DAY; DNQ	ATL	KIL	TAL; DNQ	FRS	POC	KIL	HAG	POC	TAL	DEL	FRS	ISF	TOL	DSF	SLM	ATL					NA	-	
1991		46	Chevy	DAY	ATL; 25	KIL																			32nd	865	
1991	Bahre Racing	65	Pontiac				TAL; 40	TOL	FRS																32nd	865	
1991	Finney Racing	43	Pontiac							POC; 21							HPT; 26								32nd	865	
1991	Finney Racing	43	Olds								MCH; 16	KIL	FRS	DEL											32nd	865	
1991		48	Pontiac												POC; 14										32nd	865	
1991	Peterson Motorsports		Pontiac													TAL; 20									32nd	865	
1991	Brad Smith Motorsports	43	Dodge															MCH; 36	ISF	TOL	DSF	TWS	ATL		32nd	865	
1992		43	Buick	DAY; 28	FIF	TWS	TAL	TOL	KIL	POC	MCH	FRS	KIL	NSH	DEL	POC	HPT	FRS	ISF	TOL	DSF	TWS	SLM	ATL	80th	-	
