= Jocko Maggiacomo =

American racing driver (born 1947)

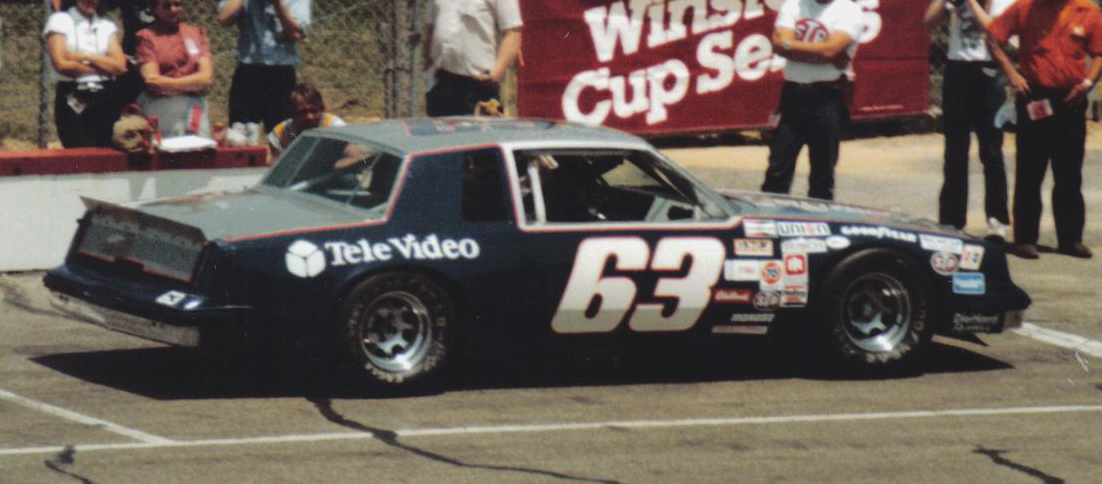
- Born: November 30, 1947 (age 78); Poughkeepsie, New York, U.S.
- Awards: 1976 SCCA Trans Am Category 1 champion

NASCAR Cup Series career
- 23 races run over 10 years
- Best finish: 60th (1977)
- First race: 1977 Coca-Cola 500 (Pocono)
- Last race: 1988 The Budweiser At The Glen (Watkins Glen)
Wins	Top tens	Poles
0	0	0

Chauncey T. Maggiacomo Jr. (born November 30, 1947) known as "Jocko" or, in high school, "Chant," is an American race car driver from Poughkeepsie, New York.

His father Chauncey T. Maggiacomo (also nicknamed Jocko) was a famous modified stock car racer in the northeast. Jocko Sr. won 31 feature races and multiple championships at Riverside Park Speedway in Agawam, Mass., and won the track's biggest event, the Riverside 500. He is eighth on the track's all-time win list. He is a member of the New England Auto Racers Hall of Fame.

Jocko Jr., followed a different path, racing sportscars with the SCCA. He rose to the professional ranks, winning the 1976 SCCA Trans Am Series championship driving an ex-Roger Penske/Mark Donohue AMC Javelin.

Moving to NASCAR, Maggiacomo started 23 Winston Cup races in ten seasons, primarily in the Northeastern United States.

Unable to avoid a spinning Bobby Allison in the 1988 Miller High Life 500 at Pocono, the T-bone crash with Maggiacomo ended Allison's driving career. According to Maggiacomo, the guilt and shame he felt despite being cleared of wrongdoing, along with the loss of a major sponsorship opportunity, led him to retire. Since 2002, Maggiacomo and his wife Debbie have owned a sign shop and graphics business in upstate New York.

== Motorsports career results ==
=== NASCAR ===
(key) (Bold – Pole position awarded by qualifying time. Italics – Pole position earned by points standings or practice time. * – Most laps led.)

==== Winston Cup Series ====
NASCAR Winston Cup Series results
Year	Team	No.	Make	1	2	3	4	5	6	7	8	9	10	11	12	13	14	15	16	17	18	19	20	21	22	23	24	25	26	27	28	29	30	31	NWCC	Pts	Ref
1977	Jocko's Racing	63	AMC	RSD	DAY	RCH	CAR	ATL	NWS	DAR	BRI	MAR	TAL	NSV	DOV	CLT	RSD	MCH	DAY	NSV	POC; 26	TAL	MCH; 27	BRI	DAR	RCH	DOV; 28	MAR	NWS	CLT	CAR	ATL	ONT; DNQ		81st	164	
1978	Jocko's Racing	63	AMC	RSD; DNQ	DAY	RCH	CAR	ATL	BRI	DAR	NWS	MAR	TAL	DOV	CLT	NSV	RSD	MCH	DAY	NSV	POC; 37	TAL	MCH	BRI	DAR	RCH	DOV	MAR	NWS	CLT	CAR	ATL	ONT		106th	52	
1979	Jocko's Racing	63	Olds	RSD	DAY	CAR	RCH	ATL	NWS	BRI	DAR	MAR	TAL	NSV	DOV	CLT	TWS	RSD	MCH	DAY	NSV	POC; 24	TAL	MCH	BRI	DAR	RCH	DOV	MAR	CLT	NWS	CAR	ATL	ONT	107th	91	
1980	Jocko's Racing	63	Olds	RSD	DAY; DNQ	RCH	CAR	ATL	BRI	DAR	NWS	MAR	TAL	NSV	DOV; 24	CLT	TWS	RSD	MCH	DAY	NSV	POC; 39	TAL	MCH	BRI	DAR	RCH	DOV	NWS	MAR	CLT	CAR	ATL	ONT	80th	137	
1981	Jocko's Racing	63	Olds	RSD	DAY	RCH	CAR	ATL	BRI	NWS	DAR	MAR	TAL	NSV	DOV	CLT	TWS	RSD	MCH	DAY	NSV	POC	TAL	MCH	BRI	DAR	RCH	DOV; 31	MAR	NWS	CLT	CAR	ATL	RSD	100th	70	
1982	Jocko's Racing	63	Olds	DAY	RCH	BRI	ATL	CAR	DAR	NWS	MAR	TAL	NSV	DOV; 26	CLT	POC; 32	RSD	MCH	DAY	NSV	POC; 34	TAL	MCH	BRI	DAR	RCH	DOV; 28	NWS	CLT	MAR	CAR	ATL; DNQ	RSD		61st	-	
1983	Linro Motorsports	63	Olds	DAY; DNQ	RCH	CAR	ATL	DAR	NWS	MAR	TAL	NSV	DOV; 36	BRI	CLT	RSD					POC; 26	TAL	MCH	BRI	DAR	RCH	DOV	MAR	NWS	CLT	CAR	ATL	RSD		60th	198	
1983	Linro Motorsports	63	Buick														POC; 35	MCH	DAY	NSV															60th	198	
1984	Linro Motorsports	63	Olds	DAY; DNQ	RCH	CAR	ATL	BRI	NWS	DAR	MAR	TAL	NSV	DOV	CLT	RSD	POC	MCH	DAY	NSV	POC	TAL	MCH	BRI	DAR	RCH	DOV	MAR	CLT	NWS	CAR	ATL	RSD		NA	-	
1986	Linro Motorsports	34	Olds	DAY	RCH	CAR	ATL	BRI	DAR	NWS	MAR	TAL	DOV	CLT	RSD	POC	MCH	DAY	POC; 39	TAL															96th	101	
1986	Linro Motorsports	63	Buick																		GLN; 36	MCH	BRI	DAR	RCH	DOV	MAR	NWS	CLT	CAR	ATL	RSD; DNQ			96th	101	
1987	Linro Motorsports	63	Chevy	DAY; Wth	CAR	RCH	ATL	DAR	NWS	BRI	MAR	TAL	CLT	DOV	POC	RSD	MCH	DAY	POC; 24	TAL	GLN; 35	MCH; DNQ	BRI	DAR	RCH	DOV	MAR	NWS	CLT	CAR	RSD; 37	ATL			63rd	201	
1988	Linro Motorsports	63	Chevy	DAY; DNQ	RCH	CAR	ATL; DNQ	DAR	BRI	NWS	MAR	TAL	CLT	DOV	RSD; 30	POC; 40	MCH	DAY	POC	TAL	GLN; 35	MCH	BRI	DAR	RCH	DOV	MAR	CLT; DNQ	NWS	CAR; DNQ	PHO	ATL			57th	174	

===== Daytona 500 =====
Year	Team	Manufacturer	Start	Finish
1980	Jocko's Racing	Oldsmobile	DNQ	
1983	Linro Motorsports	Oldsmobile	DNQ	
1984	Linro Motorsports	Oldsmobile	DNQ	
1987	Linro Motorsports	Chevrolet	Wth	
1988	Linro Motorsports	Chevrolet	DNQ	

=== ARCA Permatex SuperCar Series ===
(key) (Bold – Pole position awarded by qualifying time. Italics – Pole position earned by points standings or practice time. * – Most laps led.)

ARCA Permatex SuperCar Series results
Year	Team	No.	Make	1	2	3	4	5	6	7	8	9	10	11	12	13	14	15	16	17	18	19	APSC	Pts	Ref
1988			Chevy	DAY	ATL; 17	TAL	FRS	PCS	ROC	POC	WIN	KIL	ACS	SLM	POC	TAL	DEL	FRS	ISF	DSF	SLM	ATL	113th	-	
