= Ronnie Thomas =

American racing driver (born 1955)

Ronald Thomas
- Born: March 8, 1955 (age 71); Christiansburg, Virginia, U.S.
- Awards: 1978 Winston Cup Rookie of the Year

NASCAR Cup Series career
- 197 races run over 12 years
- Best finish: 14th (1980)
- First race: 1977 Old Dominion 500 (Martinsville)
- Last race: 1989 Miller High Life 400 (Michigan)
Wins	Top tens	Poles
0	9	0

NASCAR O'Reilly Auto Parts Series career
- 3 races run over 2 years
- Best finish: 54th (1985)
- First race: 1982 Miller 300 (Charlotte)
- Last race: 1985 Busch 200 (South Boston)
Wins	Top tens	Poles
0	1	0

ARCA Menards Series career
- 4 races run over 2 years
- Best finish: N/A
- First race: 1987 Talladega ARCA 500k (Talladega)
- Last race: 1988 96 Rock 500k (Atlanta)
Wins	Top tens	Poles
0	3	0

ARCA Menards Series West career
- 2 races run over 2 years
- Best finish: N/A
- First race: 1978 Arizona NAPA 250 (Phoenix)
- Last race: 1979 NAPA Arizona 250 (Phoenix)
Wins	Top tens	Poles
0	0	0
- Statistics up to date as of April 23, 2026.

Ronald Darrell Thomas (born March 8, 1955) is an American former NASCAR driver who drove in the NASCAR Winston Cup Series from 1977 to 1989 and the NASCAR Busch Series in 1982 and 1985. He was the 1978 NASCAR Winston Cup Rookie of the Year, edging out Roger Hamby in a race that went down to the wire at the Los Angeles Times 500. Thomas's father, Jabe Thomas was also a NASCAR driver. In 1980, his best season he finished fourteenth in the points in the No. 25 Stone's Cafeteria car. He led a career total of four laps in Winston Cup competition.

== Motorsports career results ==
=== NASCAR ===
(key) (Bold – Pole position awarded by qualifying time. Italics – Pole position earned by points standings or practice time. * – Most laps led.)

==== Winston Cup Series ====
NASCAR Winston Cup Series results
Year	Team	No.	Make	1	2	3	4	5	6	7	8	9	10	11	12	13	14	15	16	17	18	19	20	21	22	23	24	25	26	27	28	29	30	31	NWCC	Pts	Ref
1977	Robertson Racing	25	Chevy	RSD	DAY	RCH	CAR	ATL	NWS	DAR	BRI	MAR	TAL	NSV	DOV	CLT	RSD	MCH	DAY	NSV	POC; 33	TAL	MCH	BRI	DAR	RCH	DOV; 25	MAR; 19	NWS	CLT	CAR; 30	ATL	ONT		53rd	331	
1978	Robertson Racing	25	Chevy	RSD; DNQ	DAY	RCH; 18	CAR; 13	ATL; 24	BRI; 20	DAR; 31	NWS; 21	MAR; 20	TAL; 14	DOV; 32	CLT; 30	NSV; 15	RSD; 25	MCH; 18	DAY; 25	NSV; 10	POC; 33	TAL; 24	MCH; 26	BRI; 11	DAR; 9	RCH; 14		MAR; 16	NWS; 19	CLT	CAR; 33	ATL; 15	ONT; 30		18th	2733	
1978	Negre Racing	25	Chevy																								DOV; 11								18th	2733	
1979	Robertson Racing	25	Chevy	RSD; 12		CAR; 29				BRI; 23	DAR; 24	MAR; 20			DOV; 16		TWS; 26	RSD; 23	MCH; 27	DAY	NSV; 9	POC; 14		MCH; 24	BRI; 27	DAR; 24	RCH; 23	DOV; 24	MAR; 20	CLT; 38	NWS; 7	CAR; 8	ATL; 28	ONT; 27	17th	2912	
1979	Robertson Racing	25	Buick		DAY; 34		RCH; 17	ATL; 34	NWS; 28				TAL; 25										TAL; 22												17th	2912	
1979	Thomas Racing	25	Chevy											NSV; 17																					17th	2912	
1979	John Kennedy	0	Chevy													CLT; 14																			17th	2912	
1980	Robertson Racing	25	Chevy	RSD; 10		RCH; 26	CAR; 11	ATL; 22	BRI; 12	DAR; 26	NWS; 23	MAR; 22		NSV; 21		CLT; 22	TWS; 11	RSD; 16	MCH; 30		NSV; 26	POC; 23			BRI; 29	DAR; 22	RCH; 22	DOV; 10	NWS; 25	MAR; 18	CLT	CAR; 10	ATL; 8	ONT; 38	14th	3066	
1980	Robertson Racing	25	Buick		DAY; 29								TAL; 20		DOV; 11									MCH; 29											14th	3066	
1980	Robertson Racing	25	Olds																	DAY; 17			TAL; 21												14th	3066	
1981	Thomas Racing	25	Pontiac	RSD	DAY; 28	RCH; 21	CAR; 11	ATL; 31	BRI; 18	NWS; 12		MAR; 31		NSV	DOV; 24	CLT; 22	TWS; 20	RSD; 34	MCH; 25	DAY	NSV; 14	POC; 35	TAL	MCH	BRI; 18	DAR; 27		DOV; 20	MAR; 27	NWS; 17					26th	2138	
1981	Thomas Racing	25	Buick								DAR; 20																								26th	2138	
1981	Thomas Racing	25	Chevy																								RCH; 24								26th	2138	
1981	Price Racing	40	Buick										TAL; 26																						26th	2138	
1981	Ulrich Racing	40	Buick																												CLT; 32	CAR	ATL	RSD	26th	2138	
1982	Thomas Racing	25	Pontiac	DAY; DNQ	RCH	BRI; 25	ATL	CAR; 20	DAR; 13	NWS; 23	MAR	TAL	NSV; 24					MCH; 35	DAY	NSV				BRI; 28		RCH; 23	DOV; 31	NWS; 29		MAR; 25	CAR; 30	ATL	RSD		30th	1093	
1982	Thomas Racing	42	Buick																		POC; 32	TAL													30th	1093	
1982	Thomas Racing	42	Pontiac																				MCH; 17		DAR; 38				CLT; 37						30th	1093	
1982	Gordon Racing	24	Buick											DOV; 23	CLT	POC; 23	RSD																		30th	1093	
1982	Cronkrite Racing	96	Buick																										CLT; DNQ						30th	1093	
1983	Thomas Racing	41	Pontiac	DAY; 17	RCH; 23	CAR; 27	ATL; 24	DAR; 24	NWS; 17	MAR; 18	TAL; 35	NSV; 15	DOV; 25	BRI; 15	CLT; DNQ	RSD; 33	POC; 21	MCH; 24	DAY; 24	NSV; 23	POC; 20	TAL; 20	MCH; DNQ	BRI; 12	DAR; 30	RCH; 17	DOV; 24	MAR; 21	NWS; 21	CLT	CAR; 19	ATL; DNQ	RSD; 27		22nd	2515	
1984	Thomas Racing	41	Chevy	DAY; 24	RCH; 31	CAR; 32	ATL; 25	BRI; 15	NWS; 26	DAR; 28	MAR; 30	TAL; 20	NSV; 23	DOV; 30	CLT	RSD; DNQ	POC; 24	MCH; 25	DAY; 29	NSV; 21	POC; 40	TAL; 27	MCH; 23	BRI; 27	DAR; DNQ	RCH; DNQ	DOV; 35	MAR; 16	CLT; DNQ	NWS; QL^{†}	CAR	ATL; DNQ	RSD; DNQ		30th	1775	
1985	Thomas Racing	41	Chevy	DAY	RCH; 12	CAR; 34	ATL	BRI; 21	DAR	NWS	MAR; 30	TAL; DNQ	DOV	CLT	RSD	POC; 40	MCH	DAY; DNQ	POC	TAL	MCH; 19	BRI; 14	DAR	RCH	DOV	MAR	NWS	CLT	CAR	ATL	RSD				39th	631	
1986	Thomas Racing	41	Chevy	DAY	RCH; DNQ	CAR; 26	ATL	BRI; 26			MAR; DNQ							DAY; DNQ	POC																42nd	504	
1986	Thomas Racing	41	Pontiac																											CAR; 40	ATL	RSD			42nd	504	
1986	Hylton Motorsports	48	Chevy						DAR; 36	NWS		TAL; 14	DOV	CLT	RSD	POC	MCH			TAL; 16	GLN	MCH; DNQ	BRI; DNQ	DAR	RCH	DOV	MAR	NWS	CLT						42nd	504	
1987	Thomas Racing	41	Pontiac	DAY; DNQ	CAR	RCH	ATL	DAR	NWS																										56th	319	
1987	Thomas Racing	41	Chevy							BRI; 30	MAR	TAL	CLT	DOV	POC	RSD	MCH	DAY	POC	TAL	GLN	MCH	BRI; 30	DAR	RCH	DOV	MAR	NWS; 25	CLT	CAR; 26	RSD	ATL			56th	319	
1988	Thomas Racing	41	Chevy	DAY	RCH	CAR	ATL	DAR	BRI	NWS	MAR	TAL	CLT	DOV	RSD	POC	MCH	DAY	POC	TAL	GLN	MCH	BRI; DNQ	DAR	RCH	DOV	MAR	CLT	NWS	CAR	PHO	ATL			N/A	-	
1989	LC Racing	69	Ford	DAY	CAR	ATL	RCH	DAR	BRI	NWS	MAR	TAL	CLT	DOV	SON	POC	MCH; 23	DAY	POC	TAL	GLN	MCH	BRI	DAR	RCH	DOV	MAR								73rd	94	
1989																												CLT; DNQ	NWS	CAR	PHO	ATL			73rd	94	
^{†} – Qualified but replaced by Buddy Arrington

===== Daytona 500 =====
Year	Team	Manufacturer	Start	Finish
1979	Robertson Racing	Buick	41	34
1980	Robertson Racing	Buick	33	29
1981	Thomas Racing	Pontiac	19	28
1982	Thomas Racing	Pontiac	DNQ	
1983	Thomas Racing	Pontiac	36	17
1984	Thomas Racing	Chevrolet	38	24
1987	Thomas Racing	Pontiac	DNQ	

Awards
Preceded by Ricky Rudd	NASCAR Sprint Cup Series Rookie of the Year; 1978	Succeeded by Dale Earnhardt
