= Roger Hamby =

American racing driver (born 1943)

- Born: July 2, 1943 (age 83); Ferguson, North Carolina, U.S.

NASCAR Cup Series career
- 68 races run over 5 years
- Best finish: 20th (1980)
- First race: 1977 Wilkes 400 (North Wilkesboro)
- Last race: 1981 Budweiser NASCAR 400 (Texas World)
Wins	Top tens	Poles
0	2	0

Roger Hamby (born July 2, 1943, in Ferguson, North Carolina) is an American former NASCAR Winston Cup Series driver and NASCAR team owner whose career spanned from 1977 to 1981. He was one of the runners-up for the 1978 NASCAR Rookie of the Year award and has employed fellow NASCAR drivers Mark Martin, Lake Speed, and Sterling Marlin as a NASCAR team owner during the late 1980s. He now owns “Hambys Muffler” in Wilkesboro.

== Career ==
Hamby drove 19199.8 miles in his NASCAR Winston Cup Series career. His average start was 24th place, and his average finish was 21st. He formally competed in 18,446 laps of NASCAR racing, earning a lifetime total of $118,823. Hamby's top-ten finishes came at the 1978 Volunteer 400 at Bristol and the 1978 Capital City 400 at Richmond.

Hamby was most successful at the Ontario Motor Speedway, with an average finish of twelfth place, and least successful at the Pocono Raceway, where he averaged thirtieth. He performed best on short tracks. On tri-oval intermediate tracks he averaged 25th place. Before racing in the Winston Cup Series, Hamby competed in the NASCAR Dash Series. His final Dash Series race took place on February 15, 1980.

Most of Hamby's career was spent as a driver-owner in the No. 17 Chevrolet sponsored by King's Inn Daytona. One of his vehicles was involved in a major crash in the 1979 Gabriel 400 when Steve Pfeifer (replacing Hamby during the race in the No. 17 Chevrolet Impala) injured some spectators after a routine green flag pit stop went awry. As Hamby started the vehicle and made the substitution during the middle of the race, he got credit for the finish, not Pfeifer.

== Motorsports career results ==
=== NASCAR ===
(key) (Bold – Pole position awarded by qualifying time. Italics – Pole position earned by points standings or practice time. * – Most laps led.)

==== Winston Cup Series ====
NASCAR Winston Cup Series results
Year	Team	No.	Make	1	2	3	4	5	6	7	8	9	10	11	12	13	14	15	16	17	18	19	20	21	22	23	24	25	26	27	28	29	30	31	NWCC	Pts	Ref
1977	Hamby Motorsports	17	Chevy	RSD	DAY	RCH	CAR	ATL	NWS	DAR	BRI	MAR	TAL	NSV	DOV	CLT	RSD	MCH	DAY	NSV	POC	TAL	MCH	BRI	DAR	RCH	DOV	MAR	NWS; 19	CLT	CAR	ATL; 31	ONT		NA	0	
1978	Hamby Motorsports	17	Chevy	RSD; DNQ	DAY; 15	RCH; 25	CAR; 27	ATL; 37		DAR; 13	NWS; 23	MAR; 14	TAL; 19	DOV; 31	CLT	NSV; 23	RSD			NSV; 17	POC; 27	TAL; 36	MCH; 30	BRI; 10	DAR; 19	RCH; 10	DOV; 18	MAR; 24	NWS; 12	CLT; 18	CAR; 26	ATL; 11	ONT; 12		21st	2617	
1978	Hamby Motorsports	17	Olds						BRI; 17									MCH; 27	DAY																21st	2617	
1979	Hamby Motorsports	0	Olds	RSD	DAY; DNQ																														31st	1231	
1979	Hamby Motorsports	17	Chevy			CAR; 21	RCH; 30	ATL; 26	NWS; 19				TAL; DNQ	NSV	DOV	CLT	TWS	RSD	MCH; 29									DOV; 17	MAR; 19	CLT	NWS; 12	CAR	ATL	ONT	31st	1231	
1979	Hamby Motorsports	17	Olds							BRI; 14	DAR; 32	MAR								DAY; 26	NSV; 13	POC; 38	TAL	MCH	BRI	DAR	RCH								31st	1231	
1980	Hamby Motorsports	17	Chevy	RSD	DAY; QL^{†}	RCH; 16	CAR; 18	ATL; 34	BRI; 18	DAR; 16	NWS; 25	MAR	TAL; 17	NSV; 23	DOV; 13	CLT	TWS; 22	RSD; 23	MCH; 21	DAY; 27	NSV; 15	POC; 24	TAL; 22	MCH; 30	BRI; 16	DAR; 35	RCH; 16	DOV; 20	NWS; 22	MAR; 14	CLT; 28	CAR; 17	ATL; 12	ONT	20th	2606	
1981	Hamby Motorsports	17	Chevy	RSD	DAY	RCH	CAR	ATL	BRI	NWS	DAR	MAR	TAL	NSV	DOV	CLT	TWS; 27	RSD	MCH	DAY	NSV	POC	TAL	MCH	BRI	DAR	RCH	DOV	MAR	NWS	CLT	CAR	ATL	RSD	90th	82	
^{†} – Qualified but replaced by Don Whittington

===== Daytona 500 =====
Year	Team	Manufacturer	Start	Finish
1978	Hamby Motorsports	Chevrolet	30	15
1979	Hamby Motorsports	Oldsmobile	DNQ	
1980	Hamby Motorsports	Chevrolet	QL^{†}	
^{†} - Qualified but replaced by Don Whittington
