= Sam Sommers =

American racing driver (1939–2025)

- Born: Cecil Franklin Sommers; September 17, 1939; Savannah, Georgia, U.S.
- Died: December 11, 2025 (aged 86); Sylvania, Georgia, U.S.
- Awards: Georgia Racing Hall of Fame (2016)

NASCAR Cup Series career
- 30 races run over 3 years
- Best finish: 21st (1977)
- First race: 1976 World 600 (Charlotte)
- Last race: 1978 Rebel 500 (Darlington)
Wins	Top tens	Poles
0	9	1

Cecil Franklin "Sam" Sommers (September 17, 1939 – December 11, 2025) was an American stock car racing driver from Savannah, Georgia. Sommers competed in 30 NASCAR Winston Cup races between 1976 and 1978, where he achieved a total of nine top-ten finishes and one pole position. In 2016, Sommers was inducted into the Georgia Racing Hall of Fame.

Sommers died on December 11, 2025, at the age of 86.

== Motorsports career results ==
=== NASCAR ===
(key) (Bold – Pole position awarded by qualifying time. Italics – Pole position earned by points standings or practice time. * – Most laps led.)

==== Winston Cup Series ====
NASCAR Winston Cup Series results
Year	Team	No.	Make	1	2	3	4	5	6	7	8	9	10	11	12	13	14	15	16	17	18	19	20	21	22	23	24	25	26	27	28	29	30	NWCC	Pts	Ref
1976	M. C. Anderson Racing	27	Chevy	RSD	DAY	CAR	RCH	BRI	ATL	NWS	DAR	MAR	TAL	NSV	DOV	CLT; 24	RSD	MCH	DAY; DNQ	NSV	POC	TAL; 36	MCH	BRI	DAR; 30	RCH	DOV	MAR	NWS	CLT; 36	CAR	ATL; 9	ONT	52nd	412	
1977	M. C. Anderson Racing	27	Chevy	RSD	DAY; 31	RCH	CAR; 7	ATL; 13	NWS	DAR; 13	BRI; 15	MAR; 28	TAL; 10	NSV	DOV	CLT; 9	RSD	MCH; 8	DAY; 10	NSV; 24	POC; 32	TAL; 26	MCH; 4	BRI; 20	DAR; 29	RCH	DOV; 10	MAR; 5		CLT; 34	CAR; 17	**ATL**; 28	ONT; 38	21st	2517	
1977	Osterlund Racing	98	Chevy																										NWS; 14					21st	2517	
1978	Don Robertson Racing	25	Chevy	RSD	DAY; DNQ	RCH	CAR																											82nd	127	
1978	O. L. Nixon Racing	89	Chevy					ATL; 12	BRI	DAR; 27	NWS	MAR	TAL	DOV	CLT	NSV	RSD	MCH	DAY	NSV	POC	TAL	MCH	BRI	DAR	RCH	DOV	MAR	NWS	CLT	CAR	ATL	ONT	82nd	127	

===== Daytona 500 =====
Year	Team	Manufacturer	Start	Finish
1977	M. C. Anderson Racing	Chevrolet	36	31
1978	Don Robertson Racing	Chevrolet	DNQ	
