= 1977 NASCAR Winston Cup Series =

American motorsport season

Seasons
- ← 1976 1978 →

The 1977 NASCAR Grand National Winston Cup Series was the 29th season of professional stock car racing in the United States and the 6th modern era NASCAR Cup series. The season began on Sunday, January 16 and ended on Sunday, November 20. Cale Yarborough driving the Junior Johnson #11 Holly Farms Chevrolet won his second consecutive NASCAR Grand National Series Winston Cup Championship. Ricky Rudd was crowned NASCAR Rookie of the Year.

== Season recap ==
No	Date	Event	Circuit	Winner
1	January 16	Winston Western 500	Riverside International Raceway	David Pearson
	February 17	125 Mile Qualifying Races	Daytona International Speedway	Richard Petty
	February 17	125 Mile Qualifying Races	Daytona International Speedway	Cale Yarborough
2	February 20	Daytona 500	Daytona International Speedway	Cale Yarborough
3	February 27	Richmond 400	Richmond Fairgrounds Raceway	Cale Yarborough
4	March 13	Carolina 500	North Carolina Motor Speedway	Richard Petty
5	March 20	Atlanta 500	Atlanta International Raceway	Richard Petty
6	March 27	Gwyn Staley 400	North Wilkesboro Speedway	Cale Yarborough
7	April 3	Rebel 500	Darlington Raceway	Darrell Waltrip
8	April 17	Southeastern 500	Bristol International Speedway	Cale Yarborough
9	April 24	Virginia 500	Martinsville Speedway	Cale Yarborough
10	May 1	Winston 500	Alabama International Motor Speedway	Darrell Waltrip
11	May 7	Music City USA 420	Nashville Speedway	Benny Parsons
12	May 15	Mason-Dixon 500	Dover Downs International Speedway	Cale Yarborough
13	May 29	World 600	Charlotte Motor Speedway	Richard Petty
14	June 12	Riverside 400	Riverside International Raceway	Richard Petty
15	June 19	Cam 2 Motor Oil 400	Michigan International Speedway	Cale Yarborough
16	July 4	Firecracker 400	Daytona International Speedway	Richard Petty
17	July 16	Nashville 420	Nashville Speedway	Darrell Waltrip
18	July 31	Coca-Cola 500	Pocono Raceway	Benny Parsons
19	August 7	Talladega 500	Alabama International Motor Speedway	Donnie Allison*
20	August 22	Champion Spark Plug 400	Michigan International Speedway	Darrell Waltrip
21	August 28	Volunteer 400	Bristol International Speedway	Cale Yarborough
22	September 5	Southern 500	Darlington Raceway	David Pearson
23	September 11	Capital City 400	Richmond Fairgrounds Raceway	Neil Bonnett
24	September 18	Delaware 500	Dover Downs International Speedway	Benny Parsons
25	September 25	Old Dominion 500	Martinsville Speedway	Cale Yarborough
26	October 2	Wilkes 400	North Wilkesboro Speedway	Darrell Waltrip
27	October 9	National 500	Charlotte Motor Speedway	Benny Parsons
28	October 23	American 500	North Carolina Motor Speedway	Donnie Allison
29	November 6	Dixie 500	Atlanta International Raceway	Darrell Waltrip
30	November 20	Los Angeles Times 500	Ontario Motor Speedway	Neil Bonnett

Donnie Allison is credited with the win but Darrell Waltrip finished the race for an over-heated Donnie Allison after Darrell Waltrip dropped out of the race after 106 laps. Points are always scored by the driver who starts the race.

== Race Summaries ==
=== Round 1: Winston Western 500 ===
The Winston Western 500 was held January 17 at Riverside International Raceway. Cale Yarborough won the pole.

==== Top Ten ====
1. #21 - David Pearson
2. #11 - Cale Yarborough
3. #43 - Richard Petty
4. #2 - Dave Marcis
5. #67 - Sonny Easley
6. #3 - Richard Childress
7. #69 - Hershel McGriff
8. #76 - Hugh Pearson
9. #88 - Darrell Waltrip
10. #09 - Eddie Bradshaw
- David Pearson pounced when Cale Yarborough spun and seized his eleventh race in his last 23 starts, and fourth straight win on a California speedway.

=== Round 2: Daytona 500 ===
The 19th annual Daytona 500 was held February 20 at the Daytona International Speedway. Donnie Allison won the pole.

==== Top Ten ====
1. #11 - Cale Yarborough
2. #72 - Benny Parsons
3. #15 - Buddy Baker
4. #14 - Coo Coo Marlin
5. #90 - Dick Brooks
6. #51 - A.J. Foyt
7. #88 - Darrell Waltrip
8. #52 - Jimmy Means
9. #19 - Bob Burcham
10. #48 - James Hylton
- Cale Yarborough became only the second driver to win the Daytona 500 more than once, edging Benny Parsons.
- Richard Petty nearly lost a lap on the start due to an emergency stop on the pace lap; Bobby Wawak's car caught fire on Lap Four and the yellow allowed Petty to get a lap back; he roared through the field and led but fell out with engine failure, his eleventh engine-related failure in the last 37 races.

=== Round 3: Richmond 400 ===
The Richmond 400 was held February 27 at the Richmond Fairgrounds Raceway. Neil Bonnett won the pole

==== Top Ten ====
1. #11 - Cale Yarborough
2. #88 - Darrell Waltrip
3. #72 - Benny Parsons
4. #2 - Dave Marcis
5. #12 - Bobby Allison
6. #43 - Richard Petty
7. #71 - Neil Bonnett
8. #48 - James Hylton
9. #15 - Buddy Baker
10. #3 - Richard Childress
- Yarborough led 161 laps as rain cut the event short at 245 laps; it was Cale's twelfth win in the last 37 races.

=== Round 4: Carolina 500 ===
The Carolina 500 was held March 13 at the North Carolina Motor Speedway. Donnie Allison won the pole.

==== Top Ten ====
1. #43 - Richard Petty
2. #88 - Darrell Waltrip
3. #1 - Donnie Allison
4. #15 - Buddy Baker
5. #71 - Neil Bonnett
6. #11 - Cale Yarborough
7. #27 - Sam Sommers
8. #92 - Skip Manning
9. #48 - James Hylton
10. #24 - Cecil Gordon
- North Carolina Motor Speedway was repaved in the off-season and the surface proved slick; the lead changed 30 times amid numerous crashes.
- Richard Petty pounced after halfway and won handily for the first superspeedway race to finish with an average speed under 100 MPH since 1961.

=== Round 5: Atlanta 500 ===
The Atlanta 500 was held March 20 at the Atlanta International Raceway. Richard Petty won the pole.

==== Top Ten ====
1. #43 - Richard Petty
2. #21 - David Pearson
3. #11 - Cale Yarborough
4. #1 - Donnie Allison
5. #15 - Buddy Baker
6. #2 - Dave Marcis
7. #88 - Darrell Waltrip
8. #14 - Coo Coo Marlin
9. #54 - Lennie Pond
10. #47 - Bruce Hill
- Petty, Pearson, and Cale had the entire race to themselves and finished 1-2-3 as only two cautions interrupted the 500-miler.

=== Round 6: Gwyn Staley 400 ===
The Gwyn Staley 400 was held March 27 at the North Wilkesboro Speedway. Neil Bonnett won his second pole of the season in Harry Hyde's Dodge.

==== Top Ten ====
1. #11 - Cale Yarborough
2. #43 - Richard Petty
3. #72 - Benny Parsons
4. #15 - Buddy Baker
5. #12 - Bobby Allison
6. #90 - Dick Brooks
7. #88 - Darrell Waltrip
8. #3 - Richard Childress
9. #48 - James Hylton
10. #67 - Buddy Arrington
- On his 38th birthday, Yarborough led 320 laps en route to victory.

=== Round 7: Rebel 500 ===
The Rebel 500 was held April 3 at Darlington Raceway. David Pearson won the pole.

==== Top Ten ====
1. #88 - Darrell Waltrip
2. #1 - Donnie Allison
3. #43 - Richard Petty
4. #21 - David Pearson
5. #72 - Benny Parsons
6. #2 - Dave Marcis
7. #15 - Buddy Baker
8. #49 - G.C. Spencer
9. #90 - Dick Brooks
10. #47 - Bruce Hill
- Darrell Waltrip first served notice for the season as a two-car crash with six laps to go brought out the yellow; Waltrip surged as Bobby Allison (subbing for his brother Donnie in Hoss Ellington's Chevy) and Petty were racing to the line; all three hit the line abreast and Waltrip was declared the winner by inches as the race ended under yellow.

=== Round 8: Southeastern 500 ===
The Southeastern 500 was held April 17 at Bristol International Speedway. Cale Yarborough won the pole.

==== Top Ten ====
1. #11 - Cale Yarborough
2. #90 - Dick Brooks
3. #43 - Richard Petty
4. #71 - Neil Bonnett
5. #72 - Benny Parsons
6. #12 - Bobby Allison
7. #48 - James Hylton
8. #3 - Richard Childress
9. #52 - Jimmy Means
10. #22 - Ricky Rudd
- Yarborough annihilated the field at Bristol International Raceway as he led all but five laps and was seven laps ahead of runner-up Dick Brooks, this thanks in part to only two brief yellows.

=== Round 9: Virginia 500 ===
The Virginia 500 was held April 24 at Martinsville Speedway. Neil Bonnett won the pole.

==== Top Ten ====
1. #11 - Cale Yarborough
2. #72 - Benny Parsons
3. #43 - Richard Petty
4. #54 - Lennie Pond
5. #21 - David Pearson
6. #90 - Dick Brooks
7. #47 - Bruce Hill
8. #52 - Jimmy Means
9. #70 - J.D. McDuffie
10. #3 - Richard Childress
- Darrell Waltrip led 51 laps in challenging Cale and also Benny Parsons but fell out with brake failure.
- Parsons led 83 laps but was no match for Cale; the win was Yarborough's fifth of the season and 15th of the last 43 races.

=== Round 10: Winston 500 ===
The 8th annual Winston 500 was held May 1 at the Alabama International Motor Speedway. Soon to be four time Indy 500 winner A.J. Foyt won the pole

==== Top Ten ====
1. #88 - Darrell Waltrip
2. #11 - Cale Yarborough
3. #72 - Benny Parsons
4. #1 - Donnie Allison
5. #2 - Dave Marcis
6. #36 - Ron Hutcherson
7. #90 - Dick Brooks
8. #14 - Coo Coo Marlin
9. #80 - Terry Bivins
10. #27 - Sam Sommers
- The race lead changed 63 times among 11 drivers as Donnie Allison led over 70 laps.
- Richard Petty exploded from ninth to the lead on Lap Six but fell out on Lap 153 with engine failure.
- On the final lap Darrell Waltrip led with Allison second, Cale Yarborough third, and Benny Parsons fourth; Waltrip swung low in Turn Two to break the draft, and a mad scramble ensued where Cale rocketed to the high side in Three but was sideswiped by Waltrip and Parsons tried to shoot the gap; Cale edged Parsons for second as Waltrip broke away to the win.

=== Round 11: Music City 420 ===
The Music City 420 was held May 7 at Nashville Speedway. Darrell Waltrip won the pole.

==== Top Ten ====
1. #72 - Benny Parsons
2. #11 - Cale Yarborough
3. #88 - Darrell Waltrip
4. #2 - Dave Marcis
5. #43 - Richard Petty
6. #15 - Buddy Baker
7. #12 - Bobby Allison
8. #14 - Coo Coo Marlin
9. #52 - Jimmy Means
10. #22 - Ricky Rudd
- Benny Parsons ended Yarborough's streak of short track wins when he grabbed the lead with 38 laps to go after Cale had led 275 straight laps; it was the first win for Parsons in the season.

=== Round 12: Mason-Dixon 500 ===
The Mason-Dixon 500 was held May 15 at Dover Downs International Speedway. Richard Petty won the pole.

==== Top Ten ====
1. #11 - Cale Yarborough
2. #21 - David Pearson
3. #43 - Richard Petty
4. #88 - Darrell Waltrip
5. #90 - Dick Brooks
6. #72 - Benny Parsons
7. #54 - Lennie Pond
8. #12 - Bobby Allison
9. #15 - Buddy Baker
10. #84 - Morgan Shepherd
- For the second straight Dover race Cale Yarborough lost multiple laps, this time getting his damaged rear bumper repaired; Junior Johnson tore it off by hand and sent Cale back out; Cale erased his deficit and after a lap-after-lap battle with David Pearson broke away to the win, his sixth of the season, increasing his point lead to 202 over third-place finisher Richard Petty.

=== Round 13: World 600 ===
The 18th annual World 600 was held May 29 at the Charlotte Motor Speedway. David Pearson won the pole.

==== Top Ten ====
1. #43 - Richard Petty
2. #21 - David Pearson
3. #72 - Benny Parsons
4. #54 - Lennie Pond
5. #15 - Buddy Baker
6. #88 - Darrell Waltrip
7. #71 - Neil Bonnett
8. #90 - Dick Brooks
9. #27 - Sam Sommers
10. #92 - Skip Manning
- Before Petty Enterprises left for the Charlotte Motor Speedway engine builder Maurice Petty created a race motor that had the same horsepower as their qualifying motor; Richard unleashed that horsepower leading 311 laps and winning by over half a lap; he broke away from early battles with Pearson and Donnie Allison and past halfway executed a risky three-abreast pass in the trioval around Pearson and Bobby Allison driving Benny Parsons' Chevrolet in relief with Coo Coo Marlin's lapped car involved.
- Cale Yarborough broke a water pump and lost 50 laps getting repairs; his point lead was thus sliced nearly in half, to 108 points.

=== Round 14: NAPA 400 ===
The NAPA 400 was held June 12 at Riverside International Raceway. Richard Petty won the pole.

==== Top Ten ====
1. #43 - Richard Petty
2. #21 - David Pearson
3. #11 - Cale Yarborough
4. #51 - Jimmy Insolo
5. #15 - Buddy Baker
6. #93 - Norm Palmer
7. #68 - Sonny Easley
8. #3 - Richard Childress
9. #24 - Cecil Gordon
10. #92 - Skip Manning
- Petty broke away from the field for the final 63 laps and beat Pearson and Cale for his fourth win of the year; Petty and Pearson finished together in the top two for the 63rd and final time.

=== Round 15: CAM 2 Motor Oil 400 ===
The CAM 2 Motor Oil 400 was held June 19 at Michigan International Speedway. David Pearson won the pole.

==== Top Ten ====
1. #11 - Cale Yarborough
2. #43 - Richard Petty
3. #72 - Benny Parsons
4. #2 - Dave Marcis
5. #21 - David Pearson
6. #15 - Buddy Baker
7. #90 - Dick Brooks
8. #27 - Sam Sommers
9. #75 - Butch Hartman
10. #12 - Bobby Allison
- Cale Yarborough got back on track with a dominant win at Michigan International Speedway, his first there since 1970. He was critical of the track's surface, which had buckled in spots due to a hard winter: "My car jumped out of gear three times."

=== Round 16: Firecracker 400 ===
The Firecracker 400 was held Monday July 4 at the Daytona International Speedway. Neil Bonnett won the pole.

==== Top Ten ====
1. #43 - Richard Petty
2. #88 - Darrell Waltrip
3. #72 - Benny Parsons
4. #21 - David Pearson
5. #51 - A.J. Foyt
6. #1 - Donnie Allison
7. #15 - Buddy Baker
8. #5 - Neil Bonnett
9. #90 - Dick Brooks
10. #27 - Sam Sommers
- Neil Bonnett's team wrenched by Harry Hyde was purchased by mysterious coal-miner J.D. Stacy; the former K&K Insurance #71 was renumbered and painted white with red lettering; a cylinder faltered on the start and Bonnett limped home eighth.
- After Cale and Bobby Allison fought for the lead in the first 49 laps with A. J. Foyt and Darrell Waltrip (the lead changed 28 times in that span) Richard Petty took over, leading 92 of the last 111 laps.
- Waltrip who finished second would say: "I wish people would stop complaining about the Chevrolets. A Dodge won the pole here and Petty's Dodge blew my doors off."
- Cale's transmission broke and after replacing the transmission he finished 14 laps down in 23rd, saying, "When Old Blue (Petty) wanted to go, he went." Petty cut Cale's point lead to 17.

=== Round 17: Nashville 420 ===
The Nashville 420 was held July 16 at Nashville Speedway. Benny Parsons won the pole.

==== Top Ten ====
1. #88 - Darrell Waltrip
2. #12 - Bobby Allison
3. #43 - Richard Petty
4. #11 - Cale Yarborough
5. #90 - Dick Brooks
6. #15 - Buddy Baker
7. #92 - Skip Manning
8. #70 - J.D. McDuffie
9. #67 - Buddy Arrington
10. #22 - Ricky Rudd
- Darrell Waltrip led the last 251 laps for an easy win, but scoring headaches (due to pit road being the track's infield quarter-mile oval) left second and third place in dispute; Bobby Allison finished a lap down in second and Richard Petty finished third.

=== Round 18: Coca-Cola 500 ===
The Coca-Cola 500 was held July 31 at Pocono International Raceway. Darrell Waltrip won the pole, his first on a superspeedway.

==== Top Ten ====
1. #72 - Benny Parsons
2. #43 - Richard Petty
3. #88 - Darrell Waltrip
4. #12 - Bobby Allison
5. #90 - Dick Brooks
6. #11 - Cale Yarborough
7. #22 - Ricky Rudd
8. #92 - Skip Manning
9. #75 - Butch Hartman
10. #48 - James Hylton
- NASCAR mandated cylinder changes for Ford/Mercury engines that gave them some 20 extra horsepower, though David Pearson believed "we need 40" to battle the Chevrolets.
- The race lead changed hands 47 times officially as Benny Parsons flexed the most muscle he'd shown in the season to that point.
- Darrell Waltrip won his first superspeedway pole, and photos from this Pocono race were used in an October story on Waltrip in Sports Illustrated.
- Richard Petty rallied from a flat tire in the first twenty laps; he closed on Parsons in the final laps but finished a close second.
- Parsons led 118 laps for his second win of the year, while Cale Yarborough finished sixth with damage from a crash with Buddy Baker at lap 120; Petty thus took the point lead by eight points over Cale and Junior Johnson stated the car simply wasn't strong enough.

=== Round 19: Talladega 500 ===
The Talladega 500 was held August 7 at the Alabama International Motor Speedway. Benny Parsons won the pole.

==== Top Ten ====
1. #1 - Donnie Allison/Darrell Waltrip*
2. #11 - Cale Yarborough
3. #92 - Skip Manning
4. #22 - Ricky Rudd
5. #54 - Lennie Pond
6. #15 - Buddy Baker
7. #12 - Bobby Allison
8. #70 - J.D. McDuffie
9. #48 - James Hylton
10. #79 - Frank Warren
- Once again Alabama International Motor Speedway witnessed one of the most bizarre weekends in NASCAR history. Following qualifying (Benny Parsons and Donnie Allison swept the front row while Chevrolets swept the top ten; Petty's Dodge in 11th was best of the non-Chevrolets) NASCAR confiscated the fuel cell (a Banjo Matthews product that was expandable) of one of the race's entrants (the identity of the team was not revealed) and Bill Gazaway announced he was cracking down on illegal fuel cells following this plus several bouts of unusually good mileage at Pocono; he stationed an official near the garage pay phones and the names of crewmen frantically telephoning to order new fuel cells were taken down. Thus were Junior Johnson, Hoss Ellington, Bud Moore, M.C. Anderson, and DiGard Racing caught with illegal fuel cells and fined.
- Donnie Allison fought for the lead as it changed 49 times on a brutally hot day; he fell ill after drinking a bottle of soda and needed a relief driver; Darrell Waltrip arrived in the Hoss Ellington pit and drove the final 40 laps, beating Cale Yarborough and Skip Manning for the win, the final time entering the 2025 season a relief driver got the win.
- Cale was second despite complaining afterward that his car was stuck in fourth gear and was "the sorriest Chevrolet on the track"; with Petty finishing 11th with a burned valve, Cale retook the point lead and would never look back.
- This race was marred by tragedy early in the event when 69-year old Irene Sisco, mother of driver David Sisco, was struck and killed by a pickup truck in the pit area. After the incident, David pulled out of the race, and Bruce Hill drove the car for the rest of the event. Hill finished 28th with a blown engine, which Sisco getting the credit. Sisco never raced in NASCAR again after the tragedy.

=== Round 20: Champion Spark Plug 400 ===
The Champion Spark Plug 400 was originally scheduled to be held on Sunday August 21 at the Michigan International Speedway but following heavy rain, it was postponed and run on Monday August 22. David Pearson won the pole.

==== Top Ten ====
1. #88 - Darrell Waltrip
2. #21 - David Pearson
3. #72 - Benny Parsons
4. #27 - Sam Sommers
5. #11 - Cale Yarborough
6. #90 - Dick Brooks
7. #22 - Ricky Rudd
8. #43 - Richard Petty
9. #81 - Terry Ryan
10. #68 - Janet Guthrie
- This was the first Grand National race run following the passing of 1970 champion Bobby Isaac.
- With just ten races remaining in the season, Yarborough held a 50 point lead over Richard Petty.

=== Round 21: Volunteer 500 ===
The Volunteer 500 was held August 28 at Bristol International Speedway. Cale Yarborough won the pole.

==== Top Ten ====
1. #11 - Cale Yarborough
2. #88 - Darrell Waltrip
3. #72 - Benny Parsons
4. #90 - Dick Brooks
5. #30 - Tighe Scott
6. #68 - Janet Guthrie
7. #92 - Skip Manning
8. #3 - Richard Childress
9. #48 - James Hylton
10. #67 - Buddy Arrington
- Yarborough grabbed his eighth win of the season, edging Darrell Waltrip under caution.
- Yarborough with 9 races left in the season now held a 133 point lead over Richard Petty who crashed out of the race after completing 118 laps of 500 finishing 22nd.

=== Round 22: Southern 500 ===
The 28th annual Southern 500 was scheduled and held Monday September 5 at Darlington Raceway. Darrell Waltrip won the pole.

==== Top Ten ====
1. #21 - David Pearson
2. #1 - Donnie Allison
3. #15 - Buddy Baker
4. #43 - Richard Petty
5. #11 - Cale Yarborough
6. #88 - Darrell Waltrip
7. #22 - Ricky Rudd
8. #3 - Richard Childress
9. #47 - Bruce Hill
10. #52 - Bill Elliott
- The surging seasons of Yarborough and Waltrip collided hard in the Southern 500. Waltrip won the pole and Cale started fourth, and the two battled hard for first; the lead had changed hands 28 times by Lap 236 when the leaders came into lapped traffic; Waltrip slammed into Yarborough and the wreck wiped out Janet Guthrie, D.K. Ulrich, and Terry Bivins. Waltrip limped home sixth and Yarborough salvaged fourth as David Pearson pounced to the win, only his second of the season. Following the race Ulrich confronted Yarborough about the wreck, and Cale responded, "I didn't hit you, Jaws did. Jaws Waltrip." Ulrich started laughing upon recognizing the reference and it became a catchphrase for fans about Waltrip.
- With just 8 races remaining in the season, Yarborough held a 128 point lead over Richard Petty.

=== Round 23: Capital City 400 ===
The Capital City 400 was held September 11 at the Richmond Fairgrounds Raceway. Benny Parsons won the pole

==== Top Ten ====
1. #5 - Neil Bonnett
2. #43 - Richard Petty
3. #72 - Benny Parsons
4. #11 - Cale Yarborough
5. #54 - Lennie Pond
6. #12 - Bobby Allison
7. #88 - Darrell Waltrip
8. #90 - Dick Brooks
9. #48 - James Hylton
10. #52 - Jimmy Means
- Dodge Chargers finished 1-2 as Neil Bonnett, heavily coached by crew chief Harry Hyde, edged Richard Petty for his first Grand National win and the first for team owner J.D. Stacy.
- With 7 races remaining in the season, Cale Yarborough held a 118 point lead over Richard Petty.

=== Round 24: Delaware 500 ===
The Delaware 500 was held September 18 at Dover Downs International Speedway. Neil Bonnett won the pole.

1. #72 - Benny Parsons
2. #21 - David Pearson
3. #11 - Cale Yarborough
4. #1 - Donnie Allison
5. #88 - Darrell Waltrip
6. #15 - Buddy Baker
7. #3 - Richard Childress
8. #90 - Dick Brooks
9. #12 - Bobby Allison
10. #27 - Sam Sommers
- Benny Parsons and Donnie Allison combined to lead 470 of 500 laps as Parsons grabbed his third win of the season and Donnie finished fourth.
- Neil Bonnett, fresh off his first career win, won the pole and led 20 laps before finishing 17th but not running as his engines water pump failed after completing 469 of 500 laps.
- Cale Yarborough finished third and added 77 points to his lead as Richard Petty fell out with engine failure.
- Yarborough now held a 194 point lead over Petty with just 6 races left in the season.

=== Round 25: Old Dominion 500 ===
The Old Dominion 500 was held September 25 at Martinsville Speedway. Neil Bonnett won the pole.

==== Top Ten ====
1. #11 - Cale Yarborough
2. #72 - Benny Parsons
3. #21 - David Pearson/Donnie Allison
4. #43 - Richard Petty/Bobby Allison
5. #27 - Sam Sommers
6. #63 - Jimmy Hensley
7. #67 - Buddy Arrington
8. #48 - James Hylton
9. #52 - Jimmy Means
10. #88 - Darrell Waltrip
- Yarborough grabbed his ninth win of the season on a very hot day, so hot an exhausted Yarborough in a post race interview with the Motor Racing Network's reporter Ned Jarrett, called for the track to shorten the distance of its races, which earned an angry rebuke from H. Clay Earles.
- The Allison brothers after falling out early relief drove for the 21 (Donnie) & 43 (Bobby).
- Yarborough now led Petty by 219 points with just 5 races left in the season.

=== Round 26: Wilkes 400 ===
The Wilkes 400 was held October 2 at North Wilkesboro Speedway. Richard Petty won the pole.

==== Top Ten ====
1. #88 - Darrell Waltrip
2. #11 - Cale Yarborough
3. #5 - Neil Bonnett
4. #12 - Bobby Allison
5. #72 - Benny Parsons
6. #3 - Richard Childress
7. #22 - Ricky Rudd
8. #90 - Dick Brooks
9. #15 - Buddy Baker
10. #67 - Buddy Arrington
- Richard Petty's fading title hopes took another blow at North Wilkesboro Speedway. Petty led 199 laps from the pole but crashed after being sideswiped by the lapped car of Bobby Allison.
- Darrell Waltrip took the win and in postrace interviews said the race was easy according to what he called "The Cale Scale," a mocking reference to Yarborough's complaint about fatigue the week earlier.
- Yarborough now led Petty by 293 points with 4 races remaining.

=== Round 27: NAPA National 500 ===
The NAPA National 500 was held October 9 at the Charlotte Motor Speedway. David Pearson won the pole.

==== Top Ten ====
1. #72 - Benny Parsons
2. #11 - Cale Yarborough
3. #21 - David Pearson
4. #15 - Buddy Baker
5. #88 - Darrell Waltrip
6. #90 - Dick Brooks
7. #51 - A.J. Foyt
8. #5 - Neil Bonnett
9. #68 - Janet Guthrie
10. #9 - Bill Elliott
- Benny Parsons authored his most dominant run of the season as he led 250 of 334 laps and wasn't slowed despite running out of gas and losing a lap; he easily rebounded and ran down Yarborough for the win.
- Richard Petty led 25 laps but the suspension collapsed while leading; Petty's Dodge slowed off of turn four and David Pearson and Bobby Allison spun behind him. The DNF effectively ended Petty's title hopes.
- Dave Marcis finished 23rd in Penske Racing's Chevrolet, and following the race the Chevy equipment was sold to businessman Rod Osterlund and Marcis was tabbed as the new team's driver; the Mercury racecars of the Penske team meanwhile were sold to Georgia youngster Bill Elliott.
- With 3 races left to run, Yarborough now held a 378 point lead over Benny Parsons, Petty fell to third now 396 points behind Cale.

=== Round 28: American 500 ===
The American 500 was held October 23 at North Carolina Motor Speedway. Donnie Allison won the pole.

==== Top Ten ====
1. #1 - Donnie Allison
2. #43 - Richard Petty
3. #88 - Darrell Waltrip
4. #11 - Cale Yarborough
5. #90 - Dick Brooks
6. #12 - Bobby Allison
7. #72 - Benny Parsons
8. #92 - Skip Manning
9. #68 - Janet Guthrie
10. #70 - J.D. McDuffie
- Donnie Allison dominated the weekend for his second win of the year and ninth career Winston Cup Grand National win.
- Cale Yarborough clinched the championship despite a runner-up finish by Petty. Cale clinched the title with Petty working his way back up to 2nd in points but 386 points behind Cale. Benny Parsons fell back to 3rd in points but only 9 points behind Petty so Benny still had a chance for 2nd in points with 2 races remaining.
- Darrell Waltrip raced despite incurring injuries at Riverside International Raceway and also after being kicked by a mule during a parade days before the race. "I ran into a wall and got stepped on by a mule," Waltrip said afterward.

=== Round 29: Dixie 500 ===
The Dixie 500 was held November 6 at Atlanta International Raceway. Sam Sommers won his first and only pole.

==== Top Ten ====
1. #88 - Darrell Waltrip
2. #21 - David Pearson
3. #72 - Benny Parsons
4. #1 - Donnie Allison
5. #11 - Cale Yarborough
6. #43 - Richard Petty
7. #15 - Buddy Baker
8. #22 - Ricky Rudd
9. #12 - Bobby Allison
10. #14 - Coo Coo Marlin
- Rain delayed the race to the doorstep of darkness and cut its distance from 328 laps to 268 laps.
- On the final lap with darkness close to enveloping the track, Darrell Waltrip, using the lapped car of James Hylton as a pick, stormed past Donnie Allison and stole the win; Donnie crashed with Cale Yarborough at the stripe, finishing fourth.
- With one race left to run, Cale Yarborough had already clinched the championship with a total of 4830 points, and had a real chance to score 5000 points over the whole season. The battle for 2nd in points however was far from decided with it now being a three way fight between Richard Petty (4439), Benny Parsons (4438), and a resurgent Darrell Waltrip (4417). Petty held a 1 point advantage over Parsons, and a 22 point advantage over Waltrip.

=== Round 30: Los Angeles Times 500 ===
The Los Angeles Times 500 was held November 20 at the Ontario Motor Speedway. Richard Petty won the pole.

==== Top Ten ====
1. #5 - Neil Bonnett
2. #43 - Richard Petty
3. #11 - Cale Yarborough
4. #15 - Buddy Baker
5. #21 - David Pearson
6. #90 - Dick Brooks
7. #12 - Bobby Allison
8. #22 - Ricky Rudd
9. #48 - James Hylton
10. #3 - Richard Childress
- 1974 Dodge Chargers swept the front row and Petty and Neil Bonnett battled for the lead all 500 miles; the lead changed 37 official times and numerous additional times, particularly in the opening laps as Petty and Bonnett battled Pearson, A. J. Foyt, and Waltrip.
- Waltrip fell out and Pearson lost a lap late as Petty came up short of Bonnett at the stripe despite skidding through Turn Four to try to catch him. The win was Bonnett's first on a superspeedway and the 45th Winston Cup Grand National win for crew chief Harry Hyde.
- Cale Yarborough recovered from a late spin to finish third; his winning point total was 5,000, the highest point total recorded under the point system developed by Bob Latford.
- Dave Marcis finished 14th in his first race with Rod Osterlund.
- For 5 laps under caution Janet Guthrie led laps which was the first time a woman led laps in NASCAR, and would not be done by a woman in the NASCAR Monster Energy Cup Series until the 2013 Daytona 500 when Danica Patrick would lead laps.
- The three way fight for second in points was decided with Petty taking it by 44 points over Parsons, and 116 over Waltrip.

== Full Drivers’ Championship ==
(key) Bold – Pole position awarded by time. Italics – Pole position set by owner's points. * – Most laps led.

Pos.	Driver	RIV	DAY	RCH	CAR	ATL	NWS	DAR	BRI	MAR	TAL	NSV	DOV	CLT	RIV	MCH	DAY	NSV	POC	TAL	MCH	BRI	DAR	RCH	DOV	MAR	NWS	CLT	CAR	ATL	ONT	Pts
1	Cale Yarborough	**2***	1*	1*	6	3*	1*	16	**1***	1*	2	2*	1	24	3	1*	23	4	6	2	5*	**1***	5	4	3	1*	2	2	4	5	3	5000
2	Richard Petty	3	26	6	1*	**1**	2	3	3	3	20	5	**3**	1*	**1***	2	1*	3	2	11	8	22	4	2	23	4	**24***	32	2	6	**2**	4614
3	Benny Parsons	21	2	3	12	26	3	5	5	2	3	1	6	3	27	3	3	**18**	1*	**24**	3	3	25	**3**	1*	2	5	1*	7	3	12	4570
4	Darrell Waltrip	9	7	2	2	7	7	1	19	21	1	**3**	4	6	26	35	2	1*	**3**	22	1	2	**6***	7	5	10	1	5	3	1	29	4498
5	Buddy Baker	12	3	9	4	5	4	7	29	24	33	6	9	5	5	6	7	6	27	6	30	15	3	27	6	21	9	4	29	7	4	3961
6	Dick Brooks		5	27	22	23	6	9	2	6	7	22	5	8	12	7	9	5	5	39	6	4	34	8	8	26	8	6	5	37	6	3742
7	James Hylton	14	10	8	9	38	9	32	7	17	18	11	33	28	14	11	39	19	10	9	16	9	13	9	16	8	12	14	13	26	9	3476
8	Bobby Allison	35	15	5	27	41	5	29	6	19	40	7	8	39	17	10	17	2	4	7	26	28	39	6	9	23	4	26	6	9	7	3467
9	Richard Childress	6	23	10	17	19	8	17	8	10	21	26	21	14	8	34	19	27	17	20	33	8	8	26	7	15	6	16	18	21	10	3463
10	Cecil Gordon	11	17	13	10	16	13	12	17	13	16	13	12	22	9	21	11	20	21	16	19	29	19	17	21	18	15	37	23	20	32	3294
11	Buddy Arrington		38	24	14	11	10	14	14		19	15	11	18	19	19	22	9	15	12	14	10	14	25	13	7	10	17	12	17	19	3247
12	J. D. McDuffie	29	13	16	15	31	22	19	20	9	26	24	13	25	33	20	24	8	14	8	20	18	12	13	12	17	23	15	10	27	20	3236
13	David Pearson	1	21		32	2		**4***		5	22		2*	**2**	2	**5**	4		28	37	**2**		1		2	3		**3**	27	2	5	3227
14	Skip Manning		36	18	8	28	26	23	12	27	23	21	17	10	10	27	16	7	8	3	12	7	38	15	19	13	13	35	8	13	DNQ	3120
15	D. K. Ulrich	15	14	28	23	29	20	34	26	15	31	14	20	34	11	16	41	14	34	18	18	11	27	14	31	12	22	19	33	18	21	2901
16	Frank Warren	25	11	30	35	27	16	27	13		13	29	26	26	15	30	21	12	19	10	23	13	17	20	22	11	21	33	35	23	16	2876
17	Ricky Rudd **(R)**		22	26	19			22	10		28	10	27	17		28	36	10	7	4	7	16	7	11	32	27	7	24	25	8	8	2810
18	Neil Bonnett	17	37	**7**	5	12	**21**	33	4	**12**	29			7			**8**	21		25		17		1*	**17**	**22**	3	8	28	38	1*	2649
19	Jimmy Means		8	29	28	20	27	20	9	8	34	9	29	19		14	20	29	20	36	17	27		10	14	9	11	28	22	40	DNQ	2640
20	Tighe Scott **(R)**	DNQ	16	11	33	25	23	26	28	14	17		14	16		31	27	13	13	27	11	5	32	18	24	20		25	34	19	17	2628
21	Sam Sommers **(R)**		31		7	13		13	15	28	10			9		8	10	24	32	26	4	20	29		10	5	14	34	17	**28**	38	2517
22	Ed Negre	27	29	15	13	39	28	24	25	25	41		15	35					16		31	12	11	16	15	24	17	22	24	35	27	2214
23	Janet Guthrie **(R)**		12	12		30			11		32					26	40	15	11	34	10	6	16	12	11			9	9	16	24	2037
24	Donnie Allison		**30**		**3**	4		2		26	4*			33		24	6			1*			2		4*	28		36	**1***	4*	42	1970
25	Dave Marcis	4	28	4	24	6	12	6	21	20	5	4		36		4					22							23	31	36	14	1931
26	Tommy Gale **(R)**		DNQ		21	22		21		23	15		18	37		23	38		25	14	32		18	24	26			21	15		22	1689
27	Dick May		DNQ										16	21					24	17		24	31	19	20	14	20	13	14	32		1324
28	Henley Gray	32	QL	19	16	33	14	28	23	18	39	25	32	38		22		17														1214
29	Bruce Hill		25		36	10		10		7	27		35	31		32	30			35	13		9					41	26	15		1213
30	Lennie Pond				34	9		31		4			7	4			33			5			28	5	30	25		30	36			1193
31	Butch Hartman		DNQ					11			25			23		9	18		9	29	25		35					31		12		1116
32	Ferrel Harris							18	18	16	14	20	19			36						14	33	22			25					1088
33	Baxter Price												24				25	16	22		34	26	21	21	37	30	18		16			1086
34	Coo Coo Marlin		4			8					8	8		12			13	11		40			26					12		10		1004
35	Bill Elliott		DNQ		30	32								15		15	35			23	29		10					10		11		926
36	Gary Myers **(R)**				11		11	15		29		12	22					26	30				15		34							888
37	David Sisco		DNQ			QL	19		22		30	19	30	32		25	34	22		28												847
38	Terry Bivins		QL	14	26	24	17	30		11	9												24									841
39	G. C. Spencer		DNQ			21		8						20			14			31			37					18		25		785
40	Terry Ryan		18								35	27		29		17	12				9											702
41	Joe Mihalic		DNQ		29			25											18	32	24		40		18				21			683
42	Elmo Langley			20					16			23	31					28			35					16						634
43	Dean Dalton	DNQ				37		35				30	34								21	23			29				19		DNQ	620
44	Earl Brooks		DNQ	25	25		25					17	25									25										552
45	Bobby Wawak	18	42							30						18					15		22						11	29		522
46	Harold Miller					17								27			28			13	28									30		470
47	Junior Miller			17	31		18		24																		26					467
48	Rick Newsom			23			29		27			16	28	DNQ										28	27							446
49	Ramo Stott		27			15					11			40			32															440
50	Grant Adcox		34								37						26	25		15										22		413
51	Sonny Easley	5													7																26	386
52	Ralph Jones		DNQ									18						23				19	30									382
53	Ronnie Thomas																		33						25	19			30			331
54	Morgan Shepherd		DNQ										10	13																33		322
55	Walter Ballard		19	22																							16					318
56	Norm Palmer	23													6																34	305
57	Earle Canavan							36					23						35		36		23								DNQ	301
58	Jimmy Lee Capps		33		18	18																										282
59	Jim Hurtubise		35			42											15								39							259
60	Chuck Bown	13													25																39	258
61	Jimmy Hensley									22																6						247
62	Travis Tiller																					21				29			32		DNQ	243
63	Roy Smith	22	39												23																	237
64	Roland Wlodyka															29			31				36					39			15	219
65	Bill Schmitt	19													30																41	219
66	Ron Hutcherson		32								6			11			29			Wth								11			DNQ	217
67	Hershel McGriff	7	DNQ												34																	207
68	Jim Thirkettle	16													24																	206
69	Elliott Forbes-Robinson		40		20	36																										201
70	Bob Burcham		9																											34		199
71	Chuck Wahl	26													18																	194
72	Bill Seifert															12									33							191
73	Eddie Bradshaw	10													DNQ																37	186
74	Richard White	DNQ													22																25	185
75	Gary Johnson	20													29																DNQ	179
76	Mike Kempton																	30					20									176
77	Marty Robbins															13				38												173
78	Kenny Brightbill																		12						40							170
79	Peter Knab										12									33								20				167
80	Larry LaMay						24		30																							164
81	Jocko Maggiacomo																		26		27				28						DNQ	164
82	Ernie Stierly	DNQ													20																35	161
83	Don Puskarich	30													28																DNQ	152
84	Hugh Pearson	8																														142
85	John Dineen	DNQ													13																DNQ	124
86	Joe Ruttman																														13	124
87	Jody Ridley					14																										121
88	Robin Schildknecht		DNQ	21			15																		DNQ							118
89	Harry Jefferson																														18	109
90	Jim Vandiver		20																													103
91	Harry Goularte														21																DNQ	100
92	Marv Acton																							23	38							94
93	Joe Frasson		DNQ								24																					91
94	Gary Matthews	24																													DNQ	91
95	Jim Raptis		DNQ																	30								40		39		89
96	Bill Baker	28													16																DNQ	79
97	John Borneman																														28	79
98	Paul Dean Holt											28																				79
99	Greg Heller																		29													76
100	Dick Trickle																											29				76
101	Harry Gant													30																		73
102	Don Graham	DNQ																													30	73
103	Carl Joiner	31																														70
104	Ron McGee																														31	70
105	Sumner McKnight	DNQ													31																	70
106	Ray Elder														32																DNQ	67
107	Glenn Francis	33																													DNQ	64
108	Vince Giaformaggio																														33	64
109	John Kennedy															33																64
110	Jimmy Insolo	34													4																	61
111	Nestor Peles																		23						35							58
112	Phil Finney		DNQ			35																										58
113	Don Noel	DNQ													35																DNQ	58
114	Johnny Kieper																														36	55
115	Dick Skillen		DNQ								36																					55
116	Steve Stolarek																								36						DNQ	55
117	Raymond Williams												36																			55
118	Dale Earnhardt																											38				49
119	A. J. Foyt		6			34					**38**						5											7			11	
120	Johnny Rutherford		41			40														21												
121	Roger Hamby																										19			31		
122	Billy McGinnis		DNQ																											14		
123	Steve Moore																			19												
124	Randy Myers																												20			
125	Bill Osborne																														23	
126	Salt Walther		24																													
127	Blackie Wangerin		DNQ																											24		
128	Tom Sneva																											27				
129	Lella Lombardi																31															
130	Christine Beckers																37															
131	Roger McCluskey																														40	
132	Ivan Baldwin	DNQ																														
133	Nick deCourville	DNQ																														
134	J. C. Danielson	DNQ																														
135	Steve Behr	DNQ																														
136	John Soares Jr.	DNQ																														
137	Ron Esau	DNQ																														
138	Dennis Wilson	DNQ																														
139	Bryce Mann	DNQ																														
140	Chris Monoleos	DNQ																														
141	Mike Hiss	DNQ																														
142	John Hamson	DNQ													DNQ																	
143	Jack Simpson	DNQ													DNQ																DNQ	
144	Steve Pfeifer	DNQ																													DNQ	
145	Johnny Barnes		DNQ																													
146	Joe Booher		DNQ																													
147	Charlie Blanton		DNQ																													
148	A. J. Reno		DNQ																													
149	Jabe Thomas		DNQ																												DNQ	
150	Bruce Jacobi													DNQ																		
151	Joseph Schultz																														DNQ	
152	Bennie Vaught																														DNQ	
153	Mike Brockman																														DNQ	
154	Rocky Moran																														DNQ	
Pos.	Driver	RIV	DAY	RCH	CAR	ATL	NWS	DAR	BRI	MAR	TAL	NSV	DOV	CLT	RIV	MCH	DAY	NSV	POC	TAL	MCH	BRI	DAR	RCH	DOV	MAR	NWS	CLT	CAR	ATL	ONT	Pts

== See also ==
- 1977 NASCAR Winston West Series
