= 1977 Nashville 420 =

Race details
- Race 17 of 30 in the 1977 NASCAR Sprint Cup Series
- Date: July 16, 1977
- Official name: Nashville 420
- Location: Nashville Speedway, Nashville, Tennessee
- Course: Permanent racing facility
- Course length: 0.596 miles (0.959 km)
- Distance: 420 laps, 250.3 mi (402.8 km)
- Weather: Hot with temperature approaching 98.1 °F (36.7 °C); wind speeds up to 8 miles per hour (13 km/h)
- Average speed: 78.999 miles per hour (127.137 km/h)

Pole position
Driver	Benny Parsons	DeWitt Racing

Most laps led
Driver	Darrell Waltrip	DiGard Motorsports
- Laps: 300

Winner
No. 88	Darrell Waltrip	DiGard Motorsports

Television in the United States
- Network: untelevised
- Announcers: none

The 1977 Nashville 420 was a NASCAR Winston Cup Series event that took place on July 16, 1977, at Nashville Speedway in Nashville, Tennessee.

== Background ==
Nashville Speedway was converted to a half-mile paved oval in 1957, when it began to be a NASCAR series track. The speedway was lengthened between the 1969 and 1970 seasons. The corners were cut down from 35 degrees to their present 18 degrees in 1972.

== Summary ==
Four hundred and twenty laps were done on a paved oval track spanning .596 miles (0.959 km) for a grand total of 250.3 miles (402.8 km). The race took three hours, ten minutes, and nine seconds to successfully complete. Darrell Waltrip defeated Bobby Allison by more than one lap in front of seventeen thousand and five hundred people. This race was important to Waltrip as this track was considered his "local" Winston Cup Series track at the time. Ten cautions were given for fifty-four laps. Notable speeds were: 78.999 miles per hour (127.137 km/h) as the average speed and 104.21 miles per hour (167.71 km/h) as the pole position speed. Total winnings for this race were $56,175 ($291,486.86 when adjusted for inflation) and the winner walked away with $9,415 of that amount ($48,853.56 when adjusted for inflation).

Waltrip was overcome by the excessive heat shortly after the race. As a result, he took oxygen while on top of his vehicle's hood and wasn't lucid enough to give a post-race interview. Ronnie Thomas was supposed to make his debut on this track but got into a wreck and didn't get it fixed in time to qualify. He would make his debut in the 1977 running of the Old Dominion 500 (now Tums Fast Relief 500) instead.

Mike Kempton made his official NASCAR debut in this event while Henley Gray would retire from professional stock car racing as a driver after this event.

=== Qualifying ===
Grid	No.	Driver	Manufacturer
1	72	Benny Parsons	Chevrolet
2	5	Neil Bonnett	Dodge
3	11	Cale Yarborough	Chevrolet
4	3	Richard Childress	Chevrolet
5	12	Bobby Allison	Matador
6	88	Darrell Waltrip	Chevrolet
7	43	Richard Petty	Dodge
8	15	Buddy Baker	Ford
9	90	Dick Brooks	Ford
10	52	Jimmy Means	Chevrolet
11	27	Sam Sommers	Chevrolet
12	48	James Hylton	Chevrolet
13	92	Skip Manning	Chevrolet
14	70	J.D. McDuffie	Chevrolet
15	68	Janet Guthrie	Chevrolet
16	64	Elmo Langley	Ford
17	22	Ricky Rudd	Chevrolet
18	67	Buddy Arrington	Dodge
19	41	Grant Adcox	Chevrolet
20	40	D.K. Ulrich	Chevrolet

=== Finishers ===
1. Darrell Waltrip (drove a 1977 Chevrolet Chevelle Laguna vehicle)
2. Bobby Allison (drove a 1977 Matador vehicle)
3. Richard Petty (originally scored in second but was later dropped to third)
4. Cale Yarborough
5. Dick Brooks†
6. Buddy Baker†
7. Skip Manning
8. J.D. McDuffie†
9. Buddy Arrington
10. Ricky Rudd
11. Coo Coo Marlin†
12. Frank Warren†
13. Tighe Scott
14. D. K. Ulrich
15. Janet Guthrie
16. Baxter Price
17. Henley Gray
18. Benny Parsons*†
19. James Hylton†
20. Cecil Gordon†
21. Neil Bonnett*†
22. David Sisco*†
23. Ralph Jones*
24. Sam Sommers*
25. Grant Adcox*†
26. Gary Myers*
27. Richard Childress*
28. Elmo Langley*†
29. Jimmy Means*
30. Mike Kempton*

† signifies that the driver is known to be deceased
* Driver failed to finish race

== Timeline ==
Section reference:

- Start: Benny Parsons was leading the racing grid as the green flag was waved in the air.
- Lap 12: Mike Kempton overheated his vehicle, making him the last-place finisher.
- Lap 15: Ignition problems knocked Jimmy Means out of the race.
- Lap 18: Elmo Langley blew his engine while driving at high speeds.
- Lap 30: Richard Childress had a terminal crash.
- Lap 33: Neil Bonnett took over the lead from Benny Parsons.
- Lap 37: The rear end of Gary Myers' vehicle came off in an unsafe manner.
- Lap 71: Cale Yarborough took over the lead from Neil Bonnett.
- Lap 80: Darrell Waltrip took over the lead from Cale Yarborough.
- Lap 122: Grant Adcox blew his engine while driving at high speeds.
- Lap 128: The rear end of Sam Sommers' vehicle came off in an unsafe manner.
- Lap 129: Bobby Allison took over the lead from Darrell Waltrip.
- Lap 131: Richard Petty took over the lead from Bobby Allison.
- Lap 137: Ralph Jones managed to ruin his vehicle's brakes while driving at high speeds.
- Lap 141: Bobby Allison took over the lead from Richard Petty.
- Lap 146: David Sisco blew his engine while driving at high speeds.
- Lap 170: Darrell Waltrip took over the lead from Bobby Allison.
- Lap 187: Neil Bonnett blew his engine while driving at high speeds.
- Lap 381: Benny Parsons blew his engine while driving at high speeds.
- Finish: Darrell Waltrip was officially declared the winner of the race.

== Standings after the race ==
Pos	Driver	Points	Differential
1	Cale Yarborough	2795	0
2	Richard Petty	2738	-12
3	Benny Parsons	2538	-257
4	Darrell Waltrip	2500	-295
5	Buddy Baker	2346	-449
6	Dick Brooks	2147	-648
7	Cecil Gordon	2036	-759
8	Richard Childress	1933	-862
9 ▲	Bobby Allison	1870	-925
10	James Hylton	1832	-963

Preceded by 1977 Firecracker 400	NASCAR Winston Cup Series Season; 1977	Succeeded by 1977 Coca-Cola 500
