= 1980 Daytona 500 =

Auto race held at Daytona International Speedway in 1980

Race details
- Race 2 of 31 in the 1980 NASCAR Winston Cup Series
- 1980 Daytona 500 program cover
- Date: February 17, 1980
- Location: Daytona International Speedway; Daytona Beach, Florida, U.S.
- Course: Permanent racing facility 2.5 mi (4.023 km)
- Distance: 200 laps, 500 mi (804.672 km)
- Weather: Temperatures of 77 °F (25 °C); wind speeds of 19.4 miles per hour (31.2 km/h)
- Average speed: 177.602 miles per hour (285.823 km/h)

Pole position
| Driver | Buddy Baker | Ranier-Lundy Racing |
- Time: 46.368

Qualifying race winners
| Duel 1 Winner | Neil Bonnett | Wood Brothers Racing |
| Duel 2 Winner | Donnie Allison | Hoss Ellington |

Most laps led
| Driver | Buddy Baker | Ranier-Lundy Racing |
- Laps: 143

Winner
| No. 28 | Buddy Baker | Ranier-Lundy Racing |

Television in the United States
- Network: CBS
- Announcers: Lap-by-lap: Ken Squier; Driver analyst: David Hobbs; Pit reporter: Ned Jarrett; Pit reporter: Brock Yates

The 22nd annual Daytona 500 was held February 17, 1980, at Daytona International Speedway. Buddy Baker started the decade by winning the fastest Daytona 500 in history, at 177.602 mph (285.823 km/h), it was Baker's only 500 win and did so in his 18th start, the longest until Dale Earnhardt in 1998.

== Race report ==
The 1980 Daytona Speedweeks was marred by the death of Ricky Knotts, who was killed in a crash during the heat races that determine the starting field, as a result of a broken seat mount. The field of 40 cars was determined by the format consisting of the top two speeds in qualifying, top 14 non-qualified cars in each heat race, and the top ten cars on qualifying speed among cars that did not finish in the top 15 in their heat. The top two owners of 1979 among non-qualified cars (provisional starters) that made an attempt filled the field to 42.

Buddy Baker scored a dominant victory, leading 150 of 200 laps. Bonnett was on the lead lap in the final lap when his engine failed. By rule, he finished ahead of Earnhardt, who was one lap down and since Bonnett started his 200th lap, could not be caught for third. The fast pace of the race contributed to many engine failures. Earnhardt started his 20 years of Daytona 500 misfortune when, while running a close 2nd behind Baker, his team left one lugnut off a wheel on the final pit stop which forced Earnhardt to pit again, dropping a lap off the pace.

Dave Marcis drove this race with a broken rib after a crash at the end of the Sportsman 300 the day before this race; ultimately finishing in 22nd place.

== Race results ==
| Pos | Grid | No. | Driver | Team | Manufacturer | Laps | Time/Retired | Led | Points |
|---|---|---|---|---|---|---|---|---|---|
| 1 | 1 | 28 | Buddy Baker | Ranier-Lundy Racing | Oldsmobile | 200 | 2:48:55 | 143 | 185 |
| 2 | 9 | 15 | Bobby Allison | Bud Moore Engineering | Mercury | 200 | Lead lap, under caution | 9 | 175 |
| 3 | 3 | 21 | Neil Bonnett | Wood Brothers Racing | Mercury | 199 | Engine | 8 | 170 |
| 4 | 32 | 2 | Dale Earnhardt | Rod Osterlund Racing | Oldsmobile | 199 | +1 Lap | 10 | 165 |
| 5 | 14 | 27 | Benny Parsons | M. C. Anderson Racing | Oldsmobile | 197 | +3 Laps | 0 | 155 |
| 6 | 17 | 44 | Terry Labonte | Hagan Racing | Oldsmobile | 197 | +3 Laps | 0 | 150 |
| 7 | 2 | 1 | Donnie Allison | Ellington Racing | Oldsmobile | 195 | +5 Laps | 2 | 151 |
| 8 | 36 | 14 | Sterling Marlin | Cunningham-Kelley Racing | Chevrolet | 194 | +6 Laps | 0 | 142 |
| 9 | 12 | 75 | Lennie Pond | RahMoc Enterprises | Buick | 194 | +6 Laps | 0 | 138 |
| 10 | 27 | 90 | Jody Ridley | Donlavey Racing | Mercury | 194 | +6 Laps | 0 | 134 |
| 11 | 18 | 82 | Janet Guthrie | Rod Osterlund Racing | Chevrolet | 193 | +7 Laps | 0 | 130 |
| 12 | 24 | 9 | Bill Elliott | Elliott Racing | Mercury | 192 | +8 Laps | 0 | 127 |
| 13 | 22 | 3 | Richard Childress | Richard Childress Racing | Oldsmobile | 190 | +10 Laps | 0 | 124 |
| 14 | 39 | 53 | Slick Johnson | Johnson Racing | Chevrolet | 189 | +11 Laps | 0 | 121 |
| 15 | 26 | 52 | Jimmy Means | Jimmy Means Racing | Buick | 188 | +12 Laps | 0 | 118 |
| 16 | 23 | 17 | Don Whittington | Hamby Motorsports | Chevrolet | 187 | +13 Laps | 0 | 115 |
| 17 | 28 | 74 | Joe Booher | Wawak Racing | Buick | 186 | +14 Laps | 0 | – |
| 18 | 6 | 33 | John Anderson | Draime Enterprises | Oldsmobile | 183 | Vibration | 0 | 109 |
| 19 | 5 | 11 | Cale Yarborough | Junior Johnson & Associates | Oldsmobile | 183 | +17 Laps | 24 | 111 |
| 20 | 29 | 64 | Tommy Gale | Langley Racing | Ford | 176 | +24 Laps | 0 | 103 |
| 21 | 19 | 24 | Cecil Gordon | Gordon Racing | Oldsmobile | 176 | +24 Laps | 0 | 100 |
| 22 | 13 | 71 | Dave Marcis | Marcis Auto Racing | Oldsmobile | 174 | +26 Laps | 0 | 97 |
| 23 | 20 | 73 | Bill Schmitt | Schmitt Motorsports | Oldsmobile | 172 | Engine | 0 | 94 |
| 24 | 38 | 05 | Bill Elswick | RahMoc Enterprises | Oldsmobile | 161 | Engine | 0 | 91 |
| 25 | 4 | 43 | Richard Petty | Petty Enterprises | Oldsmobile | 157 | Clutch | 4 | 93 |
| 26 | 37 | 48 | James Hylton | Hylton Motorsports | Oldsmobile | 155 | +45 Laps | 0 | 85 |
| 27 | 25 | 19 | J. D. McDuffie | Gray Racing | Buick | 150 | Engine | 0 | 82 |
| 28 | 34 | 00 | John Utsman | Ed Whitaker | Chevrolet | 149 | +51 Laps | 0 | 79 |
| 29 | 33 | 25 | Ronnie Thomas | Robertson Racing | Buick | 134 | Engine | 0 | 76 |
| 30 | 21 | 8 | Kevin Housby | Housby Racing | Oldsmobile | 80 | Engine | 0 | 73 |
| 31 | 11 | 51 | A. J. Foyt | A. J. Foyt Enterprises | Oldsmobile | 69 | Quit | 0 | 70 |
| 32 | 42 | 40 | Bill Whittington | Ulrich Racing | Buick | 66 | Engine | 0 | 67 |
| 33 | 35 | 50 | Bruce Hill | Ballard Racing | Oldsmobile | 57 | Engine | 0 | 64 |
| 34 | 8 | 72 | Joe Millikan | DeWitt Racing | Oldsmobile | 52 | Engine | 0 | 61 |
| 35 | 15 | 68 | Chuck Bown | Testa Racing | Oldsmobile | 50 | Clutch | 0 | 58 |
| 36 | 41 | 7 | Dick Brooks | Nelson Malloch Racing | Oldsmobile | 44 | Axle | 0 | 55 |
| 37 | 40 | 89 | Jim Vandiver | O. L. Nixon | Oldsmobile | 38 | Transmission | 0 | 52 |
| 38 | 30 | 79 | Jim Hurlbert | Warren Racing | Dodge | 33 | Clutch | 0 | 49 |
| 39 | 16 | 30 | Tighe Scott | Ballard Racing | Buick | 24 | Engine | 0 | 46 |
| 40 | 7 | 88 | Darrell Waltrip | DiGard Racing | Oldsmobile | 20 | Engine | 0 | 43 |
| 41 | 31 | 67 | Buddy Arrington | Arrington Racing | Dodge | 17 | Engine | 0 | 40 |
| 42 | 10 | 47 | Harry Gant | Race Hill Farm Team | Oldsmobile | 15 | Engine | 0 | 37 |

| Preceded by 1980 Winston Western 500 | NASCAR Winston Cup Series Season; 1980 | Succeeded by 1980 Richmond 400 |
