= Ralph Jones (racing driver) =

American racing driver

Ralph Jones (born January 20, 1944) is a former American stock car racing driver from Upton, Kentucky. Jones competed in twenty career NASCAR Winston Cup Series races between 1977 and 1988. During the 1977 Southern 500 at Darlington Raceway, Jones was a lapped car getting passed by the leaders when he and Lennie Pond made contact off of turn 4 and crashed into the outside wall. Jones' throttle stuck and he could not steer the car and his car crashed hard into the inside wall nearly head on with the left side of the car and caught on fire. The impact broke the inside wall and knocked Jones unconscious as multiple crew members came to his aid trying to get him out of his burning race car. Jones regained consciousness and was carried on a stretcher and was carried to the infield care center. Jones was not seriously injured in the crash. Jones also competed in 16 ARCA events between 1985 and 1988, achieving one win, eight top-ten finishes, and three pole positions.
