= John Kennedy (racing driver) =

American racing driver (1939–2015)

- Born: December 25, 1939; Villa Park, Illinois, U.S.
- Died: November 23, 2015 (aged 75)

NASCAR Cup Series career
- 18 races run over 4 years
- Best finish: 49th (1969)
- First race: 1969 Race 9 (Rockingham)
- Last race: 1979 Race 28 (North Wilkesboro)
Wins	Top tens	Poles
0	0	0
- Statistics up to date as of July 4, 2022.

John Kennedy (December 25, 1939 – November 23, 2015) was a former NASCAR and ARCA driver from Villa Park, Illinois. He competed in 18 NASCAR Cup Series races, five ARCA Menards Series races, and one NASCAR West Series race in his career.

== Racing career ==
Kennedy started in 1969, he ran eight races in his own car. He debuted at North Carolina Speedway, where he started 43rd in the forty-three car field and finished there following an early engine failure. Kennedy would struggle for the rest of the year, only earning two top-twenties. The better of them was a 14th at Atlanta and then a 15th at Charlotte. With five DNFs in eight starts, Kennedy had to settle for 49th in points.

Kennedy returned for one race in 1977, running his own car at Michigan International Speedway. After starting 31st in the race, Kennedy would fall to 33rd after an engine failure. He also ran one race at Phoenix in 1977 in what was then known as the NASCAR Winston West Series.

Kennedy was back in 1978, running five more races for his team. It was a struggle to say the best. He got a best finish of just 27th at North Wilkesboro Speedway and then a pair of twenty-ninths. He did not finish any of the races, and in fact, at Atlanta, Kennedy's car broke before the start of the race and was credited with last place.

Kennedy closed his Cup Series career with five more starts in 1979, having his best season in a decade. He had a best finish of 15th at Michigan and was 18th at the other Michigan race. He also was able to finish three races on the year, the first time since 1969 that Kennedy finished a race. Following a 23rd at North Carolina Speedway, Kennedy did not compete in any other NASCAR events. He moved to the ARCA Racing Series in 1980, making one start at Illiana Speedway. After not racing in the series for the next three years, Kennedy returned to the series in 1984, making four starts.
