= 1977 Talladega 500 =

Auto race held at Alabama International Motor Speedway in 1977

Race details
- Race 19 of 30 in the 1977 NASCAR Winston Cup Series season
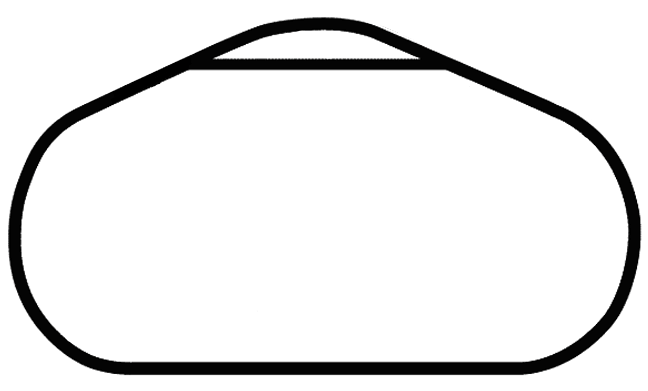
- Layout of Talladega Superspeedway
- Date: August 7, 1977
- Official name: Talladega 500
- Location: Alabama International Motor Speedway, Talladega, Alabama
- Course: Permanent racing facility
- Course length: 2.660 miles (4.280 km)
- Distance: 188 laps, 500.1 mi (804.8 km)
- Weather: Temperatures of 100.9 °F (38.3 °C); wind speeds of 9.9 miles per hour (15.9 km/h)
- Average speed: 162.524 miles per hour (261.557 km/h)
- Attendance: 65,000

Pole position
Driver	Benny Parsons	DeWitt Racing
- Time: 49.698 seconds

Most laps led
Driver	Donnie Allison	Ellington Racing
- Laps: 92

Winner
No. 1	Donnie Allison	Ellington Racing

Television in the United States
- Network: CBS
- Announcers: Ken Squier; Lee Petty

The 1977 Talladega 500 was a NASCAR Winston Cup Series race that took place on August 7, 1977, at Talladega Superspeedway in Talladega, Alabama.

== Background ==
Talladega Superspeedway, originally known as Alabama International Motor Superspeedway (AIMS), is a motorsports complex located north of Talladega, Alabama. It is located on the former Anniston Air Force Base in the small city of Lincoln. The track is a Tri-oval and was constructed by International Speedway Corporation, a business controlled by the France Family, in the 1960s. Talladega is most known for its steep banking and the unique location of the start/finish line - located just past the exit to pit road. The track currently hosts the NASCAR series such as the Sprint Cup Series, Xfinity Series, and the Camping World Truck Series. Talladega Superspeedway is the longest NASCAR oval with a length of 2.66 miles (4.28 km), and the track at its peak had a seating capacity of 175,000 spectators.

== Race report ==
Roger Penske withdrew his entry following fines to DiGard Racing, Bud Moore Engineering, the Junior Johnson team, the M.C. Anderson team, and Hoss Ellington's team; the fines came when NASCAR chief Bill Gazaway announced that an unnamed team was caught with an illegal fuel cell and an official watched members of the above-mentioned teams at garage pay phones calling for legal fuel cells. Hank Williams, Jr. served as the honorary starter of this race; joining a list of celebrities that came before and after him like Bart Starr and Will Ferrell.

Notable crew chiefs for this race included Tex Powell, Buddy Parrott, Jake Elder, Joey Arrington, Kirk Shelmerdine, Dale Inman, Harry Hyde, and Tim Brewer.

The race covered 188 laps on the paved oval spanning 2.66 miles (4.28 km) on a very hot weekend, and it was completed in three hours and four minutes with the lead changing hands 49 times among ten drivers. Donnie Allison (who would lead 92 laps overall) needed relief after drinking a soda during a pitstop and falling ill soon after. Darrell Waltrip relieved Allison and defeated Cale Yarborough by less than a lap under the caution flag; Yarborough had only the high gear remaining his vehicle. Cale Yarborough would re-take the points lead after this race while a NASCAR acolyte named Steve Moore would make his defining moment of his entire career by finishing 19th after qualifying in 40th place.

Speeds were: 162.524 miles per hour (261.557 km/h) for the winner's speed and 192.684 miles per hour (310.095 km/h) for the pole position speed. Sixty-five thousand people would attended. The race ended under a yellow flag.

Benny Parsons and Donnie Allison battled for the lead early; it changed twenty times. David Sisco allowed Bruce Hill to take over his car when he learned that his mother had been struck by a camper in the infield. The race continued under mainly green flag conditions, with engine failures taking out most of the competition.

Skip Manning would lead the only 13 laps in his Winston Cup Series career at this race. This was the only Talladega race without Dave Marcis entering until his retirement in 2002.

Most of the entries were Chevrolets. There were 39 males and one female participant (Ms. Janet Guthrie). Ms. Guthrie suffered an engine problem on lap 61 and did not finish the race. Country music star Marty Robbins did not qualify in his own vehicle; Freddy Fryar did that for him.

=== Qualifying ===
Grid	No.	Driver	Manufacturer	Owner
1	72	Benny Parsons	Chevrolet	L.G. DeWitt
2	1	Donnie Allison	Chevrolet	Hoss Ellington
3	27	Sam Sommers	Chevrolet	M.C. Anderson
4	11	Cale Yarborough	Chevrolet	Junior Johnson
5	3	Richard Childress	Chevrolet	Richard Childress
6	92	Skip Manning	Chevrolet	Billy Hagan
7	88	Darrell Waltrip	Chevrolet	DiGard
8	47	Bruce Hill	Chevrolet	Bruce Hill
9	68	Janet Guthrie	Chevrolet	Lynda Ferreri
10	14	Coo Coo Marlin	Chevrolet	H.B. Cunningham

== Finishing order ==
Section reference:

1. Donnie Allison
2. Cale Yarborough†
3. Skip Manning
4. Ricky Rudd
5. Lennie Pond†
6. Buddy Baker†
7. Bobby Allison†
8. J.D. McDuffie†
9. James Hylton†
10. Frank Warren†
11. Richard Petty
12. Buddy Arrington†
13. Harold Miller
14. Tommy Gale†
15. Grant Adcox*†
16. Cecil Gordon†
17. Dick May*†
18. D.K. Ulrich
19. Steve Moore*†
20. Richard Childress*
21. Johnny Rutherford*
22. Darrell Waltrip*
23. Bill Elliott*
24. Benny Parsons*†
25. Neil Bonnett*†
26. Sam Sommers*
27. Tighe Scott*
28. David Sisco*†
29. Butch Hartman*†
30. Jim Raptis*
31. G.C. Spencer*†
32. Joe Mihalic*
33. Peter Knab*
34. Janet Guthrie*
35. Bruce Hill*†
36. Jimmy Means*
37. David Pearson*†
38. Marty Robbins*† (his engine froze during a pit stop)
39. Dick Brooks*†
40. Coo Coo Marlin*†

* Driver failed to finish race
† signifies that the driver is known to be deceased

== Standings after the race ==
Pos	Driver	Points	Differential
1 ▲	Cale Yarborough	3125	0
2 ▼	Richard Petty	3093	-32
3	Benny Parsons	2819	-306
4	Darrell Waltrip	2772	-353
5	Buddy Baker	2583	-542
6	Dick Brooks	2348	-777
7	Cecil Gordon	2251	-874
8 ▲	Bobby Allison	2181	-944
9 ▼	Richard Childress	2153	-972
10	James Hylton	2104	-1021

Preceded by 1977 Coca-Cola 500	NASCAR Winston Cup Series Season; 1977	Succeeded by 1977 Champion Spark Plug 400

Preceded by 1976	Talladega 500 races 1977	Succeeded by 1978
