= 1977 Southern 500 =

Auto race held at Darlington Raceway in 1977

Race details
- Race 22 of 30 in the 1977 NASCAR Winston Cup Series season
- 1977 Southern 500 program cover
- Date: September 5, 1977
- Official name: Southern 500
- Location: Darlington Raceway, Darlington, South Carolina
- Course: Permanent racing facility
- Course length: 1.375 miles (2.212 km)
- Distance: 367 laps, 500.5 mi (805.4 km)
- Weather: Very hot with temperatures of 86.9 °F (30.5 °C); wind speeds of 9.9 miles per hour (15.9 km/h)
- Average speed: 106.797 miles per hour (171.873 km/h)

Pole position
Driver	Darrell Waltrip	DiGard Motorsports

Most laps led
Driver	Darrell Waltrip	DiGard Motorsports
- Laps: 123

Winner
No. 821	David Pearson	Wood Brothers Racing

Television in the United States
- Network: ABC
- Announcers: Keith Jackson; Chris Economaki

The 1977 Southern 500, the 28th running of the event, was a NASCAR Winston Cup Series race that took place on September 5, 1977, at Darlington Raceway in Darlington, South Carolina.

== Background ==
Darlington Raceway, nicknamed by many NASCAR fans and drivers as "The Lady in Black" or "The Track Too Tough to Tame" and advertised as a "NASCAR Tradition", is a race track built for NASCAR racing located near Darlington, South Carolina. It is of a unique, somewhat egg-shaped design, an oval with the ends of very different configurations, a condition which supposedly arose from the proximity of one end of the track to a minnow pond the owner refused to relocate. This situation makes it very challenging for the crews to set up their cars' handling in a way that will be effective at both ends.

The track is a four-turn 1.366 miles (2.198 km) oval. The track's first two turns are banked at twenty-five degrees, while the final two turns are banked two degrees lower at twenty-three degrees. The front stretch (the location of the finish line) and the back stretch is banked at six degrees. Darlington Raceway can seat up to 60,000 people.

Darlington has something of a legendary quality among drivers and older fans; this is probably due to its long track length relative to other NASCAR speedways of its era and hence the first venue where many of them became cognizant of the truly high speeds that stock cars could achieve on a long track. The track allegedly earned the moniker The Lady in Black because the night before the race the track maintenance crew would cover the entire track with fresh asphalt sealant, in the early years of the speedway, thus making the racing surface dark black. Darlington is also known as "The Track Too Tough to Tame" because drivers can run lap after lap without a problem and then bounce off of the wall the following lap. Racers will frequently explain that they have to race the racetrack, not their competition. Drivers hitting the wall are considered to have received their "Darlington Stripe" thanks to the missing paint on the right side of the car.

== Race report ==
"I didn't hit you, Jaws did. Jaws Waltrip."

— Cale Yarborough

Drivers competed for a total of purse $184,200 ($978,657.33 when considering inflation). Dave Marcis drove much of the race in relief of Richard Petty.

Darrell Waltrip qualified for the pole position with a speed of 153.493 miles per hour (247.023 km/h). The race covered 367 laps tof the 1.366-mile (2.198 km) paved track, totalling 501.3 miles (806.8 km). After six yellow flags for 93 laps and 32 different leaders, the race lasted four hours and forty-one minutes. Rain on lap 185 forced to cars to slow down their speed until NASCAR confirmed that the rain indeed stopped in time for the green flag on lap 204. An oil slick on lap 210 would slow down the cars yet again until workers fixed the spill around lap 222. Sixty thousand people would watch a race where David Pearson defeated Donnie Allison by 2.5 seconds with an average speed of 106.797 miles per hour (171.873 km/h). Pearson was winless in his first 15 Southern 500s, but then takes three out of four in 1976, 1977, and 1979.

Bill Elliott was driving the 52 in this race because it was a favor for Jimmy Means. Since Jimmy Means ran all the races, he was on the plan (guaranteed money for entering and starting a race). Elliott didn't run all the races so he wasn't on the plan. By running the 52 and gaining owner points for Means, it allowed Means to stay on the plan until he could race again.

Bill Elliott earned his first career top-ten finish. Terry Bivins made his final NASCAR appearance in this race. Notable crew chiefs to fully participate in this race were Buddy Parrott, Jake Elder, Joey Arrington, Kirk Shelmerdine, Dale Inman, and Tim Brewer.

=== Qualifying ===
Grid	No.	Driver	Manufacturer	Owner
1	88	Darrell Waltrip	Chevrolet	DiGard Racing
2	72	Benny Parsons	Chevrolet	L.G. DeWitt
3	15	Buddy Baker	Ford	Bud Moore
4	11	Cale Yarborough	Chevrolet	Junior Johnson
5	21	David Pearson	Mercury	Wood Brothers
6	43	Richard Petty	Dodge	Petty Enterprises
7	1	Donnie Allison	Chevrolet	Hoss Ellington
8	12	Bobby Allison	Matador	Bobby Allison
9	54	Lennie Pond	Chevrolet	Ronnie Elder
10	14	Coo Coo Marlin	Chevrolet	H.B. Cunningham
11	64	Tommy Gale	Ford	Elmo Langley
12	3	Richard Childress	Chevrolet	Richard Childress
13	49	G.C. Spencer	Dodge	G.C. Spencer
14	92	Skip Manning	Chevrolet	Billy Hagan
15	90	Dick Brooks	Ford	Junie Donlavey
16	52	Bill Elliott	Ford	George Elliott
17	27	Sam Sommers	Chevrolet	M.C. Anderson
18	22	Ricky Rudd	Chevrolet	Al Rudd
19	70	J.D. McDuffie	Chevrolet	J.D. McDuffie
20	75	Butch Hartman	Chevrolet	Butch Hartman

== Finishing order ==
Section reference:

1. David Pearson (No. 21)
2. Donnie Allison (No. 1)
3. Buddy Baker (No. 15)
4. Richard Petty (No. 43)
5. Cale Yarborough (No. 11)
6. Darrell Waltrip (No. 88)
7. Ricky Rudd (No. 22)
8. Richard Childress (No. 3)
9. Bruce Hill (No. 47)
10. Bill Elliott (No. 52)
11. Ed Negre (No. 8)
12. J.D. McDuffie (No. 70)
13. James Hylton (No. 48)
14. Buddy Arrington (No. 67)
15. Gary Myers (No. 4)
16. Janet Guthrie (No. 68)
17. Frank Warren (No. 79)
18. Tommy Gale (No. 64)
19. Cecil Gordon (No. 24)
20. Mike Kempton (No. 69)
21. Baxter Price (No. 45)
22. Bobby Wawak (No. 19)
23. Earle Canavan (No. 01)
24. Terry Bivins* (No. 91)
25. Benny Parsons* (No. 72)
26. Coo Coo Marlin* (No. 14)
27. D.K. Ulrich (No. 40)
28. Lennie Pond* (No. 54)
29. Sam Sommers* (No. 27)
30. Ralph Jones* (No. 08)
31. Dick May* (No. 10)
32. Tighe Scott* (No. 30)
33. Ferrel Harris* (No. 25)
34. Dick Brooks* (No. 90)
35. Butch Hartman* (No. 75)
36. Roland Wlodyka* (No. 98)
37. G.C. Spencer* (No. 49)
38. Skip Manning* (No. 92)
39. Bobby Allison* (No. 12)
40. Joe Mihalic* (No. 61)

* Driver failed to finish race

== Timeline ==
Section reference:

- Start: Darrell Waltrip was ahead of all the other drivers as the green flag was waved in the air.
- Lap 24: First caution of the race due to Skip Manning's accident on turn 2; caution ended on lap 33.
- Lap 65: Second caution of the race due to a two-car accident; caution ended on lap 77.
- Lap 159: Third caution of the race due to Tighe Scott's accident on turn 4; caution ended on lap 168.
- Lap 185: Fourth caution of the race due to rain; caution ended on lap 204.
- Lap 210: Fifth caution of the race due to oil on the track; caution ended on lap 222.
- Lap 236: Sixth caution of the race due to a 5-car accident in the backstretch; caution ended on lap 249.
- Lap 251: Final caution of the race due to a 2-car accident on turn 4; caution ended on lap 262.
- Finish: David Pearson was officially declared the winner of the race.

== Standings after the race ==
Pos	Driver	Points	Differential
1	Cale Yarborough	3635	0
2	Richard Petty	3507	-128
3 ▲	Darrell Waltrip	3287	-348
4 ▼	Benny Parsons	3252	-383
5	Buddy Baker	2944	-691
6	Dick Brooks	2719	-916
7	Cecil Gordon	2539	-1096
8	Richard Childress	2501	-1134
9	James Hylton	2481	-1154
10	Bobby Allison	2391	-1244

Preceded by 1977 Volunteer 400	NASCAR Winston Cup Series season 1977	Succeeded by 1977 Capital City 400
Preceded by 1976	Southern 500 races 1977	Succeeded by 1978
