= 1977 Old Dominion 500 =

Auto race held at Martinsville Speedway in 1977

Race details
- Race 25 of 30 in the 1977 NASCAR Winston Cup Series season
- A map showing the layout of Martinsville Speedway
- Date: September 25, 1977
- Official name: Old Dominion 500
- Location: Martinsville Speedway, Martinsville, Virginia
- Course: Permanent racing facility
- Course length: 0.525 miles (0.844 km)
- Distance: 500 laps, 262.5 mi (442.4 km)
- Weather: Average temperature of 76.2 °F (24.6 °C); wind speeds of 9.9 miles per hour (15.9 km/h)
- Average speed: 73.440 miles per hour (118.190 km/h)
- Attendance: 33,000

Pole position
| Driver | Neil Bonnett | Jim Stacy Racing |
- Time: 87.637 seconds

Most laps led
| Driver | Cale Yarborough | Junior Johnson & Associates |
- Laps: 352

Winner
| No. 11 | Cale Yarborough | Junior Johnson & Associates |

Television in the United States
- Network: untelevised
- Announcers: none

The 1977 Old Dominion 500 was a NASCAR Winston Cup Series racing event that took place on September 25, 1977, at the historic Martinsville Speedway; a race track that has enjoyed the presence of NASCAR since its first sanctioned race on July 4, 1948.

Cup Series races are still held on the track today in addition to the O'Reilly Auto Parts Series (started in 1982) and Craftsman Truck Series (started in 1995). Since the track was repaved back in 1976, the one-year-old concrete surface allowed cars to travel at relatively fast speeds for a short track during the 1970s.

== Background ==
Martinsville Speedway is one of five short tracks to hold NASCAR races. The standard track at Martinsville Speedway is a four-turn short track oval that is 0.526 miles (0.847 km) long. The track's turns are banked at eleven degrees, while the front stretch, the location of the finish line, is banked at zero degrees. The back stretch also has a zero degree banking.

== Race report ==
It took three hours and thirty-four minutes for the race to completely progress from the first green flag to the checkered flag. Had the race been held on this day in the year 2010, temperatures would have reached 93.0 °F (33.9 °C) - an increase of 16.8 degrees Fahrenheit from the temperatures of 1977. Five hundred laps on a paved oval track spanning 0.252 miles (0.406 km) per lap was the official distance of the race dictated by NASCAR. A grand total of 262.5 miles (422.5 km) was calculated from all the laps of the race. Thirteen lead changes were made as a part of the racing action.

Despite popular knowledge shared by non-NASCAR fans, the "500" number that was in the event's title indicated the number of laps that were in the race; as opposed to the number of kilometers or miles that the drivers had to finish. All Martinsville races traditionally advertised the number of laps that a race had because it is a very short track. Cale Yarborough managed to defeat Benny Parsons by 8/10ths of a second in front of 33000 live spectators; nine cautions slowed the race for 57 laps. Neil Bonnett would qualify for the pole position with a speed of 87.637 mph (141.038 km/h) - which would be the equivalent of 87.637 seconds. However, Yarborough would average a speed of 73.447 mph (118.201 km/h) during the entire race.

This happens to be the race that Darrell Waltrip got the engine change from his team in 10 minutes, he claimed during the 2001 Winston that Digard his team led by Buddy Parrot was able to change an engine in 10 minutes and he still finished 10th.

Yarborough would retain his championship hopes after this race; being 219 points ahead of Richard Petty in the 1977 NASCAR Cup Series standings. The other top ten finishers were: David Pearson, Richard Petty, Sam Sommers, Jimmy Hensley, Buddy Arrington, James Hylton, Jimmy Means, and Darrell Waltrip. Baxter Price would become the event's last-place finisher with an oil leak on the fourth lap of the race. Chevrolet vehicles would make up the majority of the grid with Ford, Dodge, Mercury, and Matador holding a sizeable minority of the vehicles that would compete in this event.

=== Qualifying ===
| Grid | No. | Driver | Manufacturer | Owner |
|---|---|---|---|---|
| 1 | 5 | Neil Bonnett | Dodge | Jim Stacy |
| 2 | 88 | Darrell Waltrip | Chevrolet | DiGard Racing |
| 3 | 11 | Cale Yarborough | Chevrolet | Junior Johnson |
| 4 | 43 | Richard Petty | Dodge | Petty Enterprises |
| 5 | 12 | Bobby Allison | Matador | Bobby Allison |
| 6 | 72 | Benny Parsons | Chevrolet | L.G. DeWitt |
| 7 | 1 | Donnie Allison | Chevrolet | Hoss Ellington |
| 8 | 63 | Jimmy Hensley | Chevrolet | Jimmy Hensley |
| 9 | 15 | Buddy Baker | Ford | Bud Moore |
| 10 | 21 | David Pearson | Mercury | Wood Brothers |
| 11 | 92 | Skip Manning | Chevrolet | Billy Hagan |
| 12 | 70 | J.D. McDuffie | Chevrolet | J.D. McDuffie |
| 13 | 54 | Lennie Pond | Chevrolet | Ronnie Elder |
| 14 | 22 | Ricky Rudd | Chevrolet | Al Rudd |
| 15 | 27 | Sam Sommers | Chevrolet | M.C. Anderson |

=== Technological concerns ===
Improvements in tire and engine technology in the early 1970s had made NASCAR Cup Series vehicles overpowered compared to the limited space that Martinsville Speedway had for breathing space. Further technological advancements by 2013 have caused further concern for driver safety at Martinsville; indicating that the Cup Series may have to use restrictor plates in Martinsville if tire/engine technology keeps its current pace of development.

=== Top 10 finishers ===
| Pos | Grid | No. | Driver | Manufacturer | Laps | Laps led | Points | Time/Status |
|---|---|---|---|---|---|---|---|---|
| 1 | 3 | 11 | Cale Yarborough | Chevrolet | 500 | 352 | 185 | 3:34:40 |
| 2 | 6 | 72 | Benny Parsons | Chevrolet | 500 | 73 | 175 | +0.8 seconds |
| 3 | 10 | 21 | David Pearson | Mercury | 500 | 35 | 170 | Lead lap under green flag |
| 4 | 4 | 43 | Richard Petty | Dodge | 499 | 0 | 165 | +1 lap |
| 5 | 15 | 27 | Sam Sommers | Chevrolet | 491 | 0 | 155 | +9 laps |
| 6 | 8 | 63 | Jimmy Hensley | Chevrolet | 491 | 0 | 150 | +9 laps |
| 7 | 19 | 67 | Buddy Arrington | Dodge | 487 | 0 | 146 | +13 laps |
| 8 | 24 | 48 | James Hylton | Chevrolet | 483 | 0 | 142 | +17 laps |
| 9 | 21 | 52 | Jimmy Means | Chevrolet | 482 | 0 | 138 | +18 laps |
| 10 | 2 | 88 | Darrell Waltrip | Chevrolet | 472 | 36 | 139 | Missing rear end |

== Timeline ==
Section reference:

- Start of race: Darrell Waltrip had the pole position as the green flag was waved.
- Lap 4: An oil leak in Baxter Price's vehicle forced him out of the race.
- Lap 8: Radiator issues managed to end Travis Tiller's day on the track.
- Lap 37: Cale Yarborough took over the lead from Darrell Waltrip.
- Lap 40: Benny Parsons took over the lead from Cale Yarborough.
- Lap 42: Donnie Allison suddenly lost the use of his vehicle's brakes.
- Lap 84: Ricky Rudd suddenly lost the rear end of his vehicle.
- Lap 95: Dick Brooks suddenly lost the rear end of his vehicle.
- Lap 96: David Pearson took over the lead from Benny Parsons.
- Lap 97: Bobby Allison took over the lead from David Pearson.
- Lap 101: Cale Yarborough took over the lead from Bobby Allison.
- Lap 103: Ed Negre's vehicle developed a problematic oil pump.
- Lap 179: Benny Parsons took over the lead from Cale Yarborough.
- Lap 181: David Pearson took over the lead from Benny Parsons.
- Lap 206: Bobby Allison took over the lead from David Pearson.
- Lap 216: Bobby Allison suddenly lost the rear end of his vehicle.
- Lap 304: Neil Bonnett suddenly lost the rear end of his vehicle.
- Lap 336: Buddy Baker suddenly lost the rear end of his vehicle.
- Lap 351: Benny Parsons took over the lead from Bobby Allison.
- Lap 360: Tighe Scott fell out with engine failure.
- Lap 366: Cale Yarborough took over the lead from Benny Parsons.
- Lap 373: Ronnie Thomas fell out with engine failure.
- Lap 387: David Pearson took over the lead from Cale Yarborough.
- Lap 396: Cale Yarborough took over the lead from David Pearson.
- Lap 472: Darrell Waltrip suddenly lost the rear end of his vehicle.
- Finish: Cale Yarborough was officially declared the winner of the event.

== Standings after the race ==
| Pos | Driver | Points | Differential |
|---|---|---|---|
| 1 | Cale Yarborough | 4155 | 0 |
| 2 | Richard Petty | 3936 | -219 |
| 3 | Benny Parsons | 3782 | -373 |
| 4 | Darrell Waltrip | 3727 | -428 |
| 5 | Buddy Baker | 3276 | -879 |
| 6 | Dick Brooks | 3088 | -1067 |
| 7 ▲ | James Hylton | 2876 | -1279 |
| 8 ▼ | Cecil Gordon | 2860 | -1295 |
| 9 ▼ | Richard Childress | 2855 | -1300 |
| 10 | Bobby Allison | 2873 | -1372 |

| Preceded by 1977 Delaware 500 | NASCAR Winston Cup Series Season; 1977 | Succeeded by 1977 Wilkes 400 |

| Preceded by 1976 | Old Dominion 500 races 1977 | Succeeded by 1978 |
