= 1977 Wilkes 400 =

Auto race held at North Wilkesboro Speedway in 1977

Race details
- Race 26 of 30 in the 1977 NASCAR Winston Cup Series season
- 1977 Wilkes 400 program cover
- Date: October 2, 1977
- Official name: Wilkes 400
- Location: North Wilkesboro Speedway, North Wilkesboro, North Carolina
- Course: Permanent racing facility
- Course length: 1.005 km (0.625 miles)
- Distance: 400 laps, 250 mi (402 km)
- Weather: Very hot with temperatures of 86 °F (30 °C); wind speeds of 14 miles per hour (23 km/h)
- Average speed: 86.713 mph (139.551 km/h)
- Attendance: 11,000

Pole position
Driver	Richard Petty	Petty Enterprises

Most laps led
Driver	Richard Petty	Petty Enterprises
- Laps: 199

Winner
No. 88	Darrell Waltrip	DiGard Motorsports

Television in the United States
- Network: untelevised
- Announcers: none

The 1977 Wilkes 400 was a NASCAR Winston Cup Series racing event that was held on October 2, 1977, at North Wilkesboro Speedway in North Wilkesboro, North Carolina.

By 1980, NASCAR had completely stopped tracking the year model of all the vehicles and most teams did not take stock cars to the track under their own power anymore.

== Background ==
North Wilkesboro Speedway was a short track that held races in NASCAR's top three series, including 93 Winston Cup Series races. The track, a NASCAR original, operated from 1949, NASCAR's inception, until the track's closure in 1996. The speedway briefly reopened in 2010 and hosted several Stock Car Series races, including the now-defunct ASA Late Model Series, USARacing Pro Cup Series, and PASS Super Late Models, before closing forever in the spring of 2011. The track is located on U.S. Route 421, about five miles east of the town of North Wilkesboro, North Carolina. It measured 0.625 miles (1.006 km) and featured a unique uphill backstretch and downhill frontstretch.

Three drivers entered the 1970 Wilkes 400 in a very close points race. Bobby Isaac was just ahead of James Hylton, and Bobby Allison was close behind. But Richard Petty, who was out of the points because of a shoulder injury suffered at Darlington in May, was considered the favorite to win the race. Isaac started from the pole for a record-tying fourth consecutive time, matching Fred Lorenzen and Herb Thomas with a qualifying lap time of 21.346 seconds / 105.406 mph. Fans were given quite a show as Isaac and Petty exchanged the lead a total of 11 times throughout the race. Isaac, in the Nord Krauskopf's K&K Insurance Dodge, led 179 laps and took the win by six car lengths over Petty. Petty, who had started the race in third position led the most laps in the race with 216. Bobby Allison started fourth and finished fourth behind his brother, Donnie Allison. And Hylton finished fifth at the end of day. Isaac advanced to become the 1970 Winston Cup Champion at season's end, with Allison being the runner-up in points.

Bad weather in 1971 caused the Wilkes 400 to be postponed to November 21. Due to the Grand National Series' struggling car counts, cars from NASCAR's Grand American Series were allowed to run in this race. Charlie Glotzbach broke the track record in qualifying at 20.919 seconds / 107.558 mph. It was the first lap ever run under 21 seconds at North Wilkesboro, ending Bobby Isaac's run of five consecutive poles at the track. Tiny Lund, driving a 1970 Camaro, qualified sixth and led just seven laps on his way to the victory. Lund also won another race driving the Camaro that season at Hickory. Glotzbach finished second, six seconds behind Lund, after leading 76 laps in the race. Richard Petty started from the outside pole and led 306 laps to finish third. Dave Marcis finished fourth, two laps down, and Benny Parsons rounded out the top five. Bobby Allison was the only other driver to lead, running 11 laps out front before losing an engine prior to the half.

The Wilkes 400 in 1972 was one of the wildest finishes in NASCAR Cup Series history. Buddy Baker won the pole in the No. 71 K&K Insurance Dodge owned by Nord Krauskopf, but he only led the first lap of the race. Richard Petty and Bobby Allison swapped the lead for the rest of the race, beating and banging each other for the win. At times was more of a demolition derby than a race. Both cars were destroyed by the end, with Allison's car noticeably smoking. This was the peak of the Petty-Allison rivalry. Petty was declared the winner, but in Victory Lane, a fan tried to attack him. But he was defended by his helmet-wielding brother, Maurice Petty. This was Richard Petty's last of 137 wins in a Plymouth.

In the Gwyn Staley 400 of 1973, Bobby Allison landed on the pole with a qualifying lap of 21.077 seconds / 106.750 MPH. Richard Petty qualified on the outside pole, and in dominating fashion he led 386 laps, winning by over four laps. It was Petty's tenth career win at North Wilkesboro and his 151st career NASCAR victory. Benny Parsons led six laps and finished second. Buddy Baker finished third in the No. 71 K&K Insurance Dodge owned by Nord Krauskopf. Allison lead seven laps and finished fourth in the race. Cecil Gordon rounded out the top five finishers. Yvon DuHamel, a top AMA road racer from Quebec, drove a Mercury prepared by Junie Donlavey and finished in tenth place in his only career Cup race. Twenty of the 30 cars that entered the race were running at the finish.

In the Wilkes 400 of 1973 Bobby Allison, driving for his own No. 12 Coca-Cola team, won the pole position. He and Richard Petty led most of the race, Allison with 161 and Petty with 222. As Petty led the race late, Allison pitted and got fresh tires on a late pit stop, running down Petty and passing him on the final lap. It was considered as one of the most exciting races ever at North Wilkesboro Speedway.

In 1975 the NASCAR Baby Grand Series, later known as Goody's Dash Series, ran its first race at North Wilkesboro, with a win by Dean Combs

== Race report ==
Richard Petty, Darrell Waltrip, Benny Parsons, and Cale Yarborough would constantly compete for the lead in this 400-lap event. After two hours and fifty-nine minutes of racing, Darrell Waltrip would defeat Cale Yarborough by slightly more than seven seconds in front of a live audience of eleven thousand people. There were 26 drivers on the starting grid. Junior Miller withdrew from the race on lap 5 and would become the last-place finisher in the race. Petty looked like he was going to run away with the race until he took a clobbering down the backstretch and was knocked out of the race on lap 240; he was the pole position starter by virtue of driving up to 108.35 miles per hour (174.37 km/h) during his solo qualifying run.

The winner of the race would drive at speeds averaging up to 86.713 miles per hour (139.551 km/h) in the actual event.

This would become Waltrip's fifth win of the 1977 NASCAR Winston Cup Series season. However, he would not become a credible challenger for the Winston Cup Championship until the 1980s.

Notable crew chiefs who actively participated in the race included Buddy Parrott, Jake Elder, Joey Arrington, Kirk Shelmerdine, Dale Inman, Harry Hyde, and Tim Brewer.

Monetary awards for this event ranged from $12,500 ($64,861 when adjusted for inflation) to a meager $390 ($2,024 when adjusted for inflation). The total prize purse for this racing event was $64,055 ($332,375 when adjusted for inflation).

=== Qualifying ===
Grid	No.	Driver	Manufacturer
1	43	Richard Petty	Dodge
2	5	Neil Bonnett	Dodge
3	88	Darrell Waltrip	Chevrolet
4	72	Benny Parsons	Chevrolet
5	11	Cale Yarborough	Chevrolet
6	12	Bobby Allison	AMC Matador
7	90	Dick Brooks	Ford
8	15	Buddy Baker	Ford
9	3	Richard Childress	Chevrolet
10	67	Buddy Arrington	Dodge
11	70	J.D. McDuffie	Chevrolet
12	30	Walter Ballard	Chevrolet
13	48	James Hylton	Chevrolet
14	22	Ricky Rudd	Chevrolet
15	79	Frank Warren	Dodge
16	52	Jimmy Means	Chevrolet
17	24	Cecil Gordon	Chevrolet
18	8	Ed Negre	Dodge
19	40	D.K. Ulrich	Chevrolet
20	92	Skip Manning	Chevrolet
21	98	Sam Sommers	Chevrolet
22	17	Roger Hamby	Chevrolet
23	19	Dick May	Chevrolet
24	25	Ferrell Harris	Chevrolet
25	45	Baxter Price	Chevrolet
26	95	Junior Miller	Chevrolet

== Results ==
POS	ST	#	DRIVER	SPONSOR / OWNER	CAR	LAPS	MONEY	STATUS	LED	PTS
1	3	88	Darrell Waltrip	Gatorade (DiGard Racing)	Chevrolet	400	12500	running	189	180
2	5	11	Cale Yarborough	Holly Farms (Junior Johnson)	Chevrolet	400	8775	running	1	175
3	2	5	Neil Bonnett	Jim Stacy	Dodge	399	5700	running	0	165
4	6	12	Bobby Allison	1st National City Travelers Checks (Bobby Allison)	Matador	397	3225	running	0	160
5	4	72	Benny Parsons	1st National City Travelers Checks (L.G. DeWitt)	Chevrolet	396	3875	running	11	160
6	9	3	Richard Childress	Kansas Jack (Richard Childress)	Chevrolet	388	2400	running	0	150
7	14	22	Ricky Rudd	Al Rudd Auto Parts (Al Rudd)	Chevrolet	388	2730	running	0	146
8	7	90	Dick Brooks	Truxmore (Junie Donlavey)	Ford	387	1895	running	0	142
9	8	15	Buddy Baker	Norris Industries (Bud Moore)	Ford	387	2975	running	0	138
10	10	67	Buddy Arrington	Mistec Transmission (Buddy Arrington)	Dodge	384	1650	running	0	134
11	16	52	Jimmy Means	Means Racing (Bill Gray)	Chevrolet	383	1365	running	0	130
12	13	48	James Hylton	Hylton Engineering (James Hylton)	Chevrolet	382	1480	running	0	127
13	20	92	Skip Manning	Sunny King Ford & Honda (Billy Hagan)	Chevrolet	377	2345	running	0	124
14	21	98	Sam Sommers	Rod Osterlund	Chevrolet	377	650	running	0	121
15	17	24	Cecil Gordon	Transmissions Unlimited (Cecil Gordon)	Chevrolet	377	1185	running	0	118
16	12	30	Walter Ballard	Scotty's Fashions (Walter Ballard)	Chevrolet	374	1000	running	0	115
17	18	8	Ed Negre	Ed Negre	Dodge	373	825	running	0	112
18	25	45	Baxter Price	County Line Food Store (Baxter Price)	Chevrolet	368	550	running	0	109
19	22	17	Roger Hamby	Hamby-Ellis (Roger Hamby)	Chevrolet	367	525	running	0	
20	23	19	Dick May	Belden Asphalt (Henley Gray)	Chevrolet	363	750	running	0	103
21	15	79	Frank Warren	Native Tan (Frank Warren)	Dodge	322	675	running	0	100
22	19	40	D.K. Ulrich	J.R. DeLotto	Chevrolet	290	700	engine	0	97
23	11	70	J.D. McDuffie	J.D. McDuffie	Chevrolet	286	680	rear end	0	94
24	1	43	Richard Petty	STP (Petty Enterprises)	Dodge	240	4560	crash	199	101
25	24	25	Ferrel Harris	Don Robertson	Chevrolet	114	650	overheating	0	88
26	26	95	Junior Miller	Miller Roofing (Junior Miller)	Chevrolet	5	390	quit	0	85

== Timeline ==
Section reference:

- Start of race: Richard Petty started the race with the pole position.
- Lap 5: Junior Miller quit the race for personal reasons.
- Lap 77: Darrell Waltrip took over the lead from Richard Petty.
- Lap 105: Richard Petty took over the lead from Darrell Waltrip.
- Lap 113: Darrell Waltrip took over the lead from Richard Petty; Petty took it back on the following lap.
- Lap 114: Ferrel Harris managed to overheat his vehicle, forcing him to exit the event early.
- Lap 136: Darrell Waltrip took the lead from Richard Petty.
- Lap 137: Benny Parsons took over the lead from Darrell Waltrip.
- Lap 148: Richard Petty took over the lead from Benny Parsons.
- Lap 240: Richard Petty had a terminal crash; causing him to withdraw from the event.
- Lap 241: Darrell Waltrip took over the lead from Richard Petty.
- Lap 286: The rear end of J.D. McDuffie vehicle stopped being useful, sending him home early.
- Lap 290: D.K. Ulrich's engine became problematic; forcing him to exit the race prematurely.
- Lap 311: Cale Yarborough took the lead from Darrell Waltrip.
- Lap 312: Darrell Waltrip took the lead from Cale Yarborough.
- Finish: Darrell Waltrip was officially declared the winner of the event.

== Post-race standings ==
Pos	Driver	Points	Differential
1	Cale Yarborough	4330	0
2	Richard Petty	4037	-293
3	Benny Parsons	3942	-388
4	Darrell Waltrip	3907	-423
5	Buddy Baker	3414	-916
6	Dick Brooks	3230	-1100
7 ▲	Richard Childress	3005	-1325
8 ▼	James Hylton	3003	-1327
9 ▼	Cecil Gordon	2978	-1352
10	Bobby Allison	2943	-1387

Preceded by 1977 Old Dominion 500	NASCAR Winston Cup Series Season; 1977	Succeeded by 1977 NAPA National 500

Preceded by 1976	Wilkes 400 races 1977	Succeeded by 1978
