= NASCAR Cup Series at Ontario Motor Speedway =

Former annual auto race held in California

Los Angeles Times 500
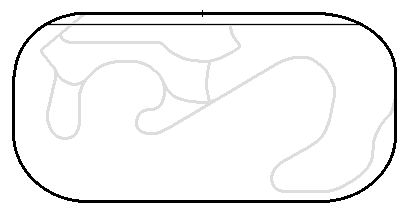

NASCAR Winston Cup Series
- Venue: Ontario Motor Speedway
- Corporate sponsor: Los Angeles Times
- First race: 1971
- Last race: 1980
- Distance: 500 miles (805 km)
- Laps: 200
- Previous names: Miller High Life 500 (1971–1972); Los Angeles Times 500 (1974–1980)

Stock car races in the NASCAR Cup Series were held at Ontario Motor Speedway in Ontario, California, United States, in February from 1971 to 1972 and in November from 1974 to 1980. Benny Parsons is the final winner of this race.

== Past winners ==
Year	Date	No.	Driver	Team	Manufacturer	Race Distance		Race Time	Average Speed (mph)	Report	Ref
Year	Date	No.	Driver	Team	Manufacturer	Laps	Miles (km)	Race Time	Average Speed (mph)	Report	Ref
1971	February 28	21	A. J. Foyt	Wood Brothers Racing	Mercury	200	500 (804.672)	3:43:36	134.168	Report	
1972	March 5	21	A. J. Foyt	Wood Brothers Racing	Mercury	200	500 (804.672)	3:56:04	127.082	Report	
1973	March 4	Not held									
1974	November 24	12	Bobby Allison	Penske Racing	AMC	200	500 (804.672)	3:42:17	134.963	Report	
1975	November 23	15	Buddy Baker	Bud Moore Engineering	Ford	200	500 (804.672)	3:33:12	140.712	Report	
1976	November 21	21	David Pearson	Wood Brothers Racing	Mercury	200	500 (804.672)	3:38:49	137.101	Report	
1977	November 20	5	Neil Bonnett	Jim Stacy	Dodge	200	500 (804.672)	3:53:50	128.296	Report	
1978	November 19	15	Bobby Allison	Bud Moore Engineering	Ford	200	500 (804.672)	3:37:44	137.783	Report	
1979	November 18	27	Benny Parsons	M.C. Anderson Racing	Chevrolet	200	500 (804.672)	3:45:52	132.822	Report	
1980	November 15	27	Benny Parsons	M.C. Anderson Racing	Chevrolet	200	500 (804.672)	3:51:46	129.441	Report	

=== Multiple winners (drivers) ===
# Wins	Driver	Years won	Ref(s)
2	A. J. Foyt	1971, 1972	
2	Bobby Allison	1974, 1978	
2	Benny Parsons	1979, 1980	

=== Multiple winners (teams) ===
# Wins	Team	Years won	Ref(s)
3	Wood Brothers Racing	1971, 1972, 1976	
2	Bud Moore Engineering	1975, 1978	
2	M.C. Anderson Racing	1979, 1980	

=== Manufacturer wins ===
# Wins	Manufacturer	Years won	Ref(s)
3	Mercury	1971, 1972, 1976	
2	Ford	1975, 1978	
2	Chevrolet	1979, 1980	
1	AMC	1974	
1	Dodge	1977	

== Notes ==
- Ontario's first two NASCAR 500s were run in late February and early March and both were won by A. J. Foyt in the Wood Brothers Mercury. Foyt's 1972 win was his final NASCAR-sanctioned win. The purse for these races were $180,200 and $175,345 respectively, surpassing the Daytona 500's as the highest in the series.
- Ownership changes at Ontario Motor Speedway kept the scheduled March 4, 1973 NASCAR event from running.
- Bobby Allison won the 1974 running for Roger Penske's first win on a NASCAR oval; Allison was fined nearly $10,000 after the race when postrace inspection discovered unapproved valve lifters.
- David Pearson led the final 120 laps in a runaway win in 1976; it was his tenth big-track win of the season.
- Bonnett's 1977 win was his first on a superspeedway and the last for the Dodge marque until 2001. Dodges finished 1-2 as Richard Petty skidded through Turn Four in a last-lap bid for the win.
- Janet Guthrie in 1977 would lead five laps under caution it was the first time a woman led a lap in Cup Series, and it would not happen again until 2013 when a woman would lead laps in a race in Cup Series.
- Bobby Allison posted his fifth win of 1978 in the Times 500. Richard Petty engaged Allison and others in a huge battle for the lead in the first half of the race, driving a Chevrolet, before blowing his engine. Cale Yarborough pitted on the pace lap with distributor problems but rallied to finish third.
- The 1979 500 was the race that clinched the seventh driving title for Richard Petty, while the 1980 500 clinched the first driving title for Dale Earnhardt. Benny Parsons won both times. The 1980 race also was contested on a Saturday.
- The 500 was a combination race between Winston Cup and NASCAR's Winston West series. The Winston West series staged two stand-alone races at Ontario — on May 15, 1977, Gary Johnson edged Bill Schmitt in the Winston 250, while on April 13, 1980, Canadian racer Roy Smith passed Schmitt with eleven laps to go to win the Datsun 200.
- Ontario also hosted double-header races, the Datsun Twin 200, for Indy cars and stock cars under United States Auto Club sanction, which also drew numerous NASCAR competitors. On March 6, 1977 Jimmy Insolo edged Bobby Unser and A. J. Foyt in the stock car 200; on March 26, 1978, Foyt led 71 of 80 laps to beat Jim Thirkettle and Insolo; on March 25, 1979, Foyt beat Joe Ruttman and Rusty Wallace for the 200-mile win.
