= 1977 Firecracker 400 =

Auto race held at Daytona International Speedway in 1977

Race details
- Race 16 of 30 in the 1977 NASCAR Winston Cup Series season
- 1977 Firecracker 400 program cover
- Date: July 4, 1977
- Official name: Firecracker 400
- Location: Daytona International Speedway, Daytona Beach, Florida
- Course: Permanent racing facility
- Course length: 2.500 miles (4.023 km)
- Distance: 160 laps, 400 mi (643 km)
- Weather: Extremely hot with temperatures of 90.9 °F (32.7 °C); wind speeds of 12 miles per hour (19 km/h)
- Average speed: 142.716 miles per hour (229.679 km/h)

Pole position
Driver	Neil Bonnett	Jim Stacy Racing

Most laps led
Driver	Richard Petty	Petty Enterprises
- Laps: 95

Winner
No. 43	Richard Petty	Petty Enterprises

Television in the United States
- Network: ABC (tape delay)
- Announcers: Keith Jackson

The 1977 Firecracker 400 was a NASCAR Winston Cup Series race that took place on July 4, 1977, at Daytona International Speedway in Daytona Beach, Florida.

For the first time since 1949, three women raced in an official NASCAR Cup Series race: Italian Lella Lombardi, Belgian Christine Beckers, and American Janet Guthrie. One driver scored one-seventh of a point in one season (for sharing a fastest lap, recorded only down to the second, with six others) but scored 51 more in other years.

== Race report ==
A racing grid of 41 drivers competed in this race; including Belgian driver Christine Beckers and Italian Lella Lombardi. D.K. Ulrich would finish last due to an engine problem on the fourth lap. Janet Guthrie was the only American-born female driver on the grid. While A. J. Foyt, Cale Yarborough, Richard Petty and Darrell Waltrip would lead the opening laps of the race, Donnie Allison and Richard Petty would fight it out for supremacy in the crucial final laps.

Lombardi and Beckers were invited by NASCAR with the idea to pit the three women against each other on the track. Lella Lombardi and Christine Beckers raced as teammates in the 24 Hours of Le Mans, finishing just outside the top-10 in their Ford-powered entry, three weeks before this race then raced against each other here.

Richard Petty would go on to defeat Darrell Waltrip by 18 seconds in front of 65,000 people; marking the final win for Richard Petty in his trusty 1974 Dodge Charger. Engine problems knocked most of the drivers out of the race. Neil Bonnett would win the pole position with a qualifying speed of 187.191 miles per hour (301.255 km/h) while the speed of the race was 147.216 miles per hour (236.921 km/h).

There was two-hour rain delay two laps before halfway. There was a storm covering from the tri-oval over the first and second turns for about two hours while the third and fourth turns were in sunshine due to the incessant hot and humid weather of Florida during the summer months.

Most of the vehicles at this event were Dodge or Chevrolet with some Ford vehicles and a single entry by an AMC Matador. Winnings for this race ranged from $19,075 ($101,346 when adjusted for inflation) for the winner to $1,390 for last-place. ($7,385 when adjusted for inflation). Ramo Stott would retire from professional stock car racing after this event.

=== Qualifying ===
Grid	No.	Driver	Manufacturer	Owner
1	5	Neil Bonnett	Dodge	Jim Stacy
2	11	Cale Yarborough	Chevrolet	Junior Johnson
3	72	Benny Parsons	Chevrolet	L.G. DeWitt
4	36	Ron Hutcherson	Chevrolet	John Gwinn
5	43	Richard Petty	Dodge	Petty Enterprises
6	51	A.J. Foyt	Chevrolet	A.J. Foyt
7	27	Sam Sommers	Chevrolet	M.C. Anderson
8	1	Donnie Allison	Chevrolet	Hoss Ellington
9	12	Bobby Allison	Matador	Bobby Allison
10	81	Terry Ryan	Chevrolet	Bill Monaghan

== Results ==
POS	ST	#	DRIVER	SPONSOR / OWNER	CAR	LAPS	MONEY	STATUS	LED	PTS
1	5	43	Richard Petty	STP (Petty Enterprises)	Dodge	160	23075	running	95	185
2	12	88	Darrell Waltrip	Gatorade (DiGard Racing)	Chevrolet	160	16350	running	21	175
3	3	72	Benny Parsons	1st National City Travelers Checks (L.G. DeWitt)	Chevrolet	160	12300	running	1	170
4	14	21	David Pearson	Purolator (Wood Brothers)	Mercury	160	6900	running	0	160
5	6	51	A.J. Foyt	Gilmore (A.J. Foyt)	Chevrolet	160	4700	running	4	
6	8	1	Donnie Allison	Hawaiian Tropic (Hoss Ellington)	Chevrolet	160	4570	running	12	155
7	32	15	Buddy Baker	Norris Industries (Bud Moore)	Ford	160	6670	running	0	146
8	1	5	Neil Bonnett	Pocahontas Group (Jim Stacy)	Dodge	158	4020	running	1	147
9	30	90	Dick Brooks	Truxmore (Junie Donlavey)	Ford	157	5220	running	0	138
10	7	27	Sam Sommers	M.C. Anderson	Chevrolet	156	3570	running	0	134
11	26	24	Cecil Gordon	Burger King (Cecil Gordon)	Chevrolet	154	4820	running	0	130
12	10	81	Terry Ryan	Valvoline (Bill Monaghan)	Chevrolet	154	2370	running	0	127
13	25	14	Coo Coo Marlin	Cunningham-Kelley (H.B. Cunningham)	Chevrolet	154	2270	running	0	124
14	34	49	G.C. Spencer	Lady & Son Auction (G.C. Spencer)	Dodge	154	2195	running	0	121
15	38	6	Jim Hurtubise	Moran Electric (Ray Emerson)	Chevrolet	154	2065	running	0	118
16	21	92	Skip Manning	1st National City Travelers Checks (Billy Hagan)	Chevrolet	153	5195	running	0	115
17	9	12	Bobby Allison	1st National City Travelers Checks (Bobby Allison)	Matador	152	3935	running	13	117
18	15	75	Butch Hartman	Hartman Autocar (Butch Hartman)	Chevrolet	152	1765	running	0	109
19	27	3	Richard Childress	Black Gold Oil (Richard Childress)	Chevrolet	151	3475	running	0	106
20	23	52	Jimmy Means	Marianne II (Bill Gray)	Chevrolet	151	2805	running	0	103
21	35	79	Frank Warren	Native Tan (Frank Warren)	Dodge	149	2845	running	0	100
22	28	67	Buddy Arrington	Pagoda Motel (Buddy Arrington)	Dodge	148	2535	running	0	97
23	2	11	Cale Yarborough	Holly Farms (Junior Johnson)	Chevrolet	146	2350	running	13	99
24	22	70	J.D. McDuffie	J.D. McDuffie	Chevrolet	143	2350	engine	0	91
25	40	45	Baxter Price	Baxter Price	Chevrolet	142	1165	running	0	88
26	18	41	Grant Adcox	Adcox-Kirby (Herb Adcox)	Chevrolet	134	1140	running	0	85
27	13	30	Tighe Scott	Scotty's Fashions (Walter Ballard)	Chevrolet	123	2015	engine	0	82
28	33	91	Harold Miller	Bartow Paving (Harold Miller)	Chevrolet	118	1140	running	0	79
29	4	36	Ron Hutcherson	Encyclopedia Britannica (John Gwinn)	Chevrolet	117	1805	engine	0	
30	11	47	Bruce Hill	t. edwards (Bruce Hill)	Chevrolet	111	1040	engine	0	73
31	29	05	Lella Lombardi	Bearfinder (Charles Dean)	Chevrolet	103	785	rear end	0	
32	19	60	Ramo Stott	Lou Viglione	Chevrolet	81	990	engine	0	67
33	16	54	Lennie Pond	U.S. Army (Ronnie Elder)	Chevrolet	57	1595	steering	0	64
34	39	16	David Sisco	Bath World (David Sisco)	Chevrolet	56	1560	engine	0	61
35	31	9	Bill Elliott	Dahlonega Ford Sales (George Elliott)	Ford	46	915	overheating	0	58
36	17	22	Ricky Rudd	Al Rudd Auto Parts (Al Rudd)	Chevrolet	45	910	transmission	0	55
37	37	93	Christine Beckers	t. edwards-Genre (Junie Donlavey)	Ford	33	695	brakes	0	
38	36	64	Tommy Gale	Sunny King Ford & Honda (Elmo Langley)	Ford	33	1500	engine	0	49
39	24	48	James Hylton	Kansas Jack (James Hylton)	Chevrolet	24	1470	rear end	0	46
40	20	68	Janet Guthrie	Kelly Girl (Lynda Ferreri)	Chevrolet	11	890	engine	0	43
41	41	40	D.K. Ulrich	Hair Shack (J.R. DeLotto)	Chevrolet	4	1390	engine	0	40

== Standings after the race ==
Pos	Driver	Points	Differential
1	Cale Yarborough	2630	0
2	Richard Petty	2613	-17
3	Benny Parsons	2426	-206
4	Darrell Waltrip	2315	-315
5	Buddy Baker	2196	-434
6	Dick Brooks	1992	-638
7	Cecil Gordon	1933	-697
8	Richard Childress	1851	-779
9 ▲	David Pearson	1809	-821
10	James Hylton	1726	-904

Preceded by 1976	Firecracker 400 races 1976	Succeeded by 1978

Preceded by 1977 Cam 2 Motor Oil 400	NASCAR Winston Cup Series Season; 1977	Succeeded by 1977 Nashville 420

Preceded by 1977 NAPA 400	Richard Petty's Career Wins; 1960-1984	Succeeded by 1979 Daytona 500
