= Ramo Stott =

American race car driver (1934–2021)

- Born: April 6, 1934; Kahoka, Missouri, U.S.
- Died: August 19, 2021 (aged 87); Keokuk, Iowa, U.S.
- Achievements: 1975 USAC Stock Car champion 1970 ARCA Series champion 1971 ARCA Series champion 1976 Daytona 500 pole winner
- Awards: National Dirt Late Model Hall of Fame (2011)

NASCAR Cup Series career
- 35 races run over 10 years
- Best finish: 39th (1967, 1974)
- First race: 1967 Daytona 500 (Daytona)
- Last race: 1977 Firecracker 400 (Daytona)
Wins	Top tens	Poles
0	17	1
- Statistics up to date as of April 20, 2013.

Ramo Stott (April 6, 1934 – August 19, 2021) was an American stock car racing driver from Keokuk, Iowa. He competed in NASCAR Winston Cup, USAC stock car, and ARCA. He was a 2011 inductee in the National Dirt Late Model Hall of Fame.

== Career ==
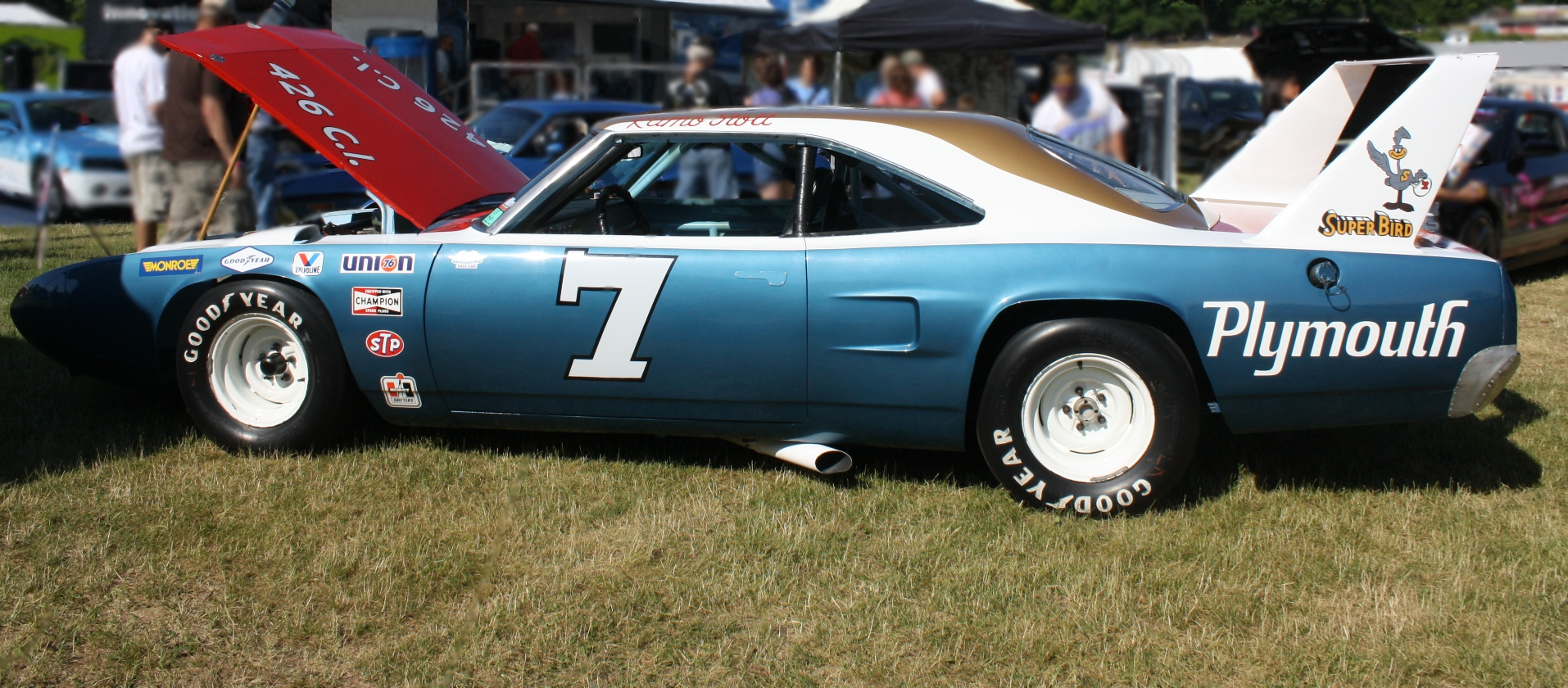
Stott's 1970 to 1972 stock car used in ARCA, USAC, and NASCAR

Stott was one of a large group of national drivers from Keokuk, Iowa.

=== ARCA ===
Stott won his first ARCA race in 1969 at Crown Point Speedway (Indiana).

Stott was the ARCA champion in 1970 and 1971. His ARCA career stretched from the 1950s to 1990s. Stott won 27 ARCA races in his career, which placed him seventh on the series all-time wins at his time of death. Stott's final ARCA victory came in 1988 at Hazard, Kentucky.

=== USAC ===
Stott competed in USAC's stock car division, finishing second in 1973, 1976, and 1977, first in 1975, and third in 1974.

=== NASCAR ===
Stott's greatest NASCAR accomplishment was starting from the pole for the 1976 Daytona 500. He was awarded the pole after the front-row starters, Darrell Waltrip and A. J. Foyt along with Dave Marcis, were disqualified for illegal engines. He raced part-time in 35 starts between 1967 and 1984 along with leading ten races. His highest career finish was second at Talladega. In the Daytona 500, Stott scored his best finish of third in 1974, two top-fives, and four top-tens. In his overall NASCAR career, he had five top-fives and seventeen top-tens.

== Life after racing ==
Stott farmed corn and beans during his racing career. He became a NASCAR official and drove the NASCAR pace car.

== Family life ==
Stott's sons Lance and Corrie both drove in ARCA before working in the racing industry. Stott was married to his wife Judy for 66 years. She helped repair cars in his garage and attended his races. He also had two daughters.

== Legacy ==
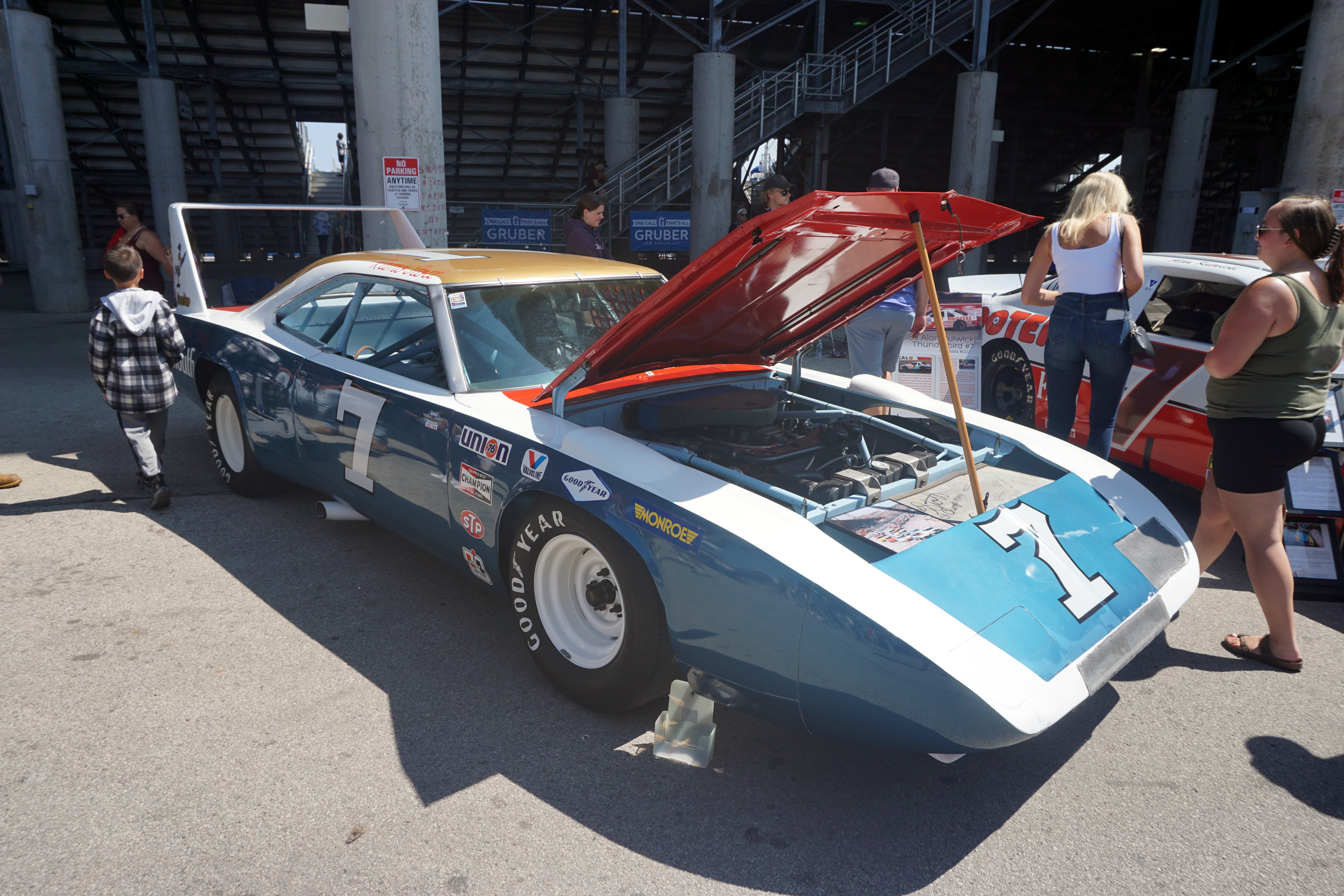
Ramo Stott's No. 7 Plymouth Superbird at the Milwaukee Mile in 2023

At the July 2021 race, ARCA honored former champions from Iowa at Iowa Speedway. He was honored along with fellow Keokuk driver Ron Hutcherson, Mason Mitchell, and team owner Larry Clement.

Stott was inducted in the National Dirt Late Model Hall of Fame in 2011.

=== Death ===
Stott died on August 19, 2021 from cancer.

== Motorsports results ==
=== NASCAR ===
(key) (Bold – Pole position awarded by qualifying time. Italics – Pole position earned by points standings or practice time. * – Most laps led.)

==== Grand National Series ====
NASCAR Grand National Series results
Year	Team	No.	Make	1	2	3	4	5	6	7	8	9	10	11	12	13	14	15	16	17	18	19	20	21	22	23	24	25	26	27	28	29	30	31	32	33	34	35	36	37	38	39	40	41	42	43	44	45	46	47	48	49	50	51	52	53	54	NGNC	Pts	Ref
1967	Ramo Stott	0	Plymouth	AUG	RSD	DAY; 12	DAY	DAY; 23	AWS	BRI	GPS	BGS	ATL	CLB	HCY	NWS	MAR	SVH	RCH	DAR	BLV	LGY																																				39th	5676	
1967	Ramo Stott	01	Plymouth																				CLT; 8	ASH	MGR	SMR	BIR	CAR	GPS	MGY	DAY	TRN	OXF	FDA	ISP	BRI	SMR	NSV	ATL	BGS	CLB	SVH	DAR	HCY	RCH	BLV	HBO	MAR	NWS	CLT	CAR	AWS						39th	5676	
1969	Ramo Stott	29	Plymouth	MGR	MGY	RSD	DAY	DAY; 9	DAY; 33	CAR	AUG	BRI	ATL	CLB	HCY	GPS	RCH	NWS	MAR	AWS	DAR	BLV	LGY	CLT	MGR	SMR	MCH	KPT	GPS	NCF	DAY	DOV	TPN	TRN	BLV	BRI	NSV	SMR	ATL	MCH	SBO	BGS	AWS	DAR	HCY	RCH												69th	96	
1969	Bill Ellis	14	Dodge																																												TAL; 3	CLB	MAR	NWS	CLT	SVH	AUG	CAR	JFC	MGR	TWS	69th	96	
1970	Ramo Stott	7	Plymouth	RSD	DAY; 8	DAY	DAY; 8	RCH	CAR	SVH	ATL	BRI	TAL	NWS	CLB	DAR	BLV	LGY	CLT	SMR	MAR	MCH	RSD	HCY	KPT	GPS	DAY	AST	TPN	TRN	BRI	SMR	NSV	ATL	CLB	ONA	MCH																					60th	172	
1970	Ramo Stott	77	Plymouth																																			TAL; 8	BGS	SBO	DAR	HCY	RCH	DOV	NCF	NWS	CLT	MAR	MGR	CAR	LGY							60th	172	
1971	Ramo Stott	7	Plymouth	RSD	DAY	DAY; 6	DAY; 11	ONT	RCH	CAR	HCY	BRI	ATL	CLB	GPS	SMR	NWS	MAR	DAR	SBO	TAL	ASH	KPT	CLT	DOV	MCH	RSD	HOU	GPS	DAY	BRI	AST	ISP	TRN	NSV	ATL	BGS	ONA	MCH	TAL	CLB	HCY	DAR	MAR	CLT	DOV	CAR	MGR	RCH	NWS								64th	165	
1971	Ramo Stott	9	Plymouth																																																TWS; 11							64th	165	

==== Winston Cup Series ====
NASCAR Winston Cup Series results
Year	Team	No.	Make	1	2	3	4	5	6	7	8	9	10	11	12	13	14	15	16	17	18	19	20	21	22	23	24	25	26	27	28	29	30	31	NWCC	Pts	Ref
1972	Bill Moyer	17	Dodge	RSD	DAY; DNQ																														66th	675.25	
1972	Jack Housby	9	Dodge		DAY; 37	RCH	ONT; 10	CAR	ATL	BRI	DAR	NWS	MAR																						66th	675.25	
1972	Bill Moyer	9	Dodge											TAL; DNQ	CLT	DOV	MCH	RSD	TWS	DAY	BRI	TRN	ATL												66th	675.25	
1972	Donlavey Racing	90	Ford																					TAL; 2	MCH	NSV	DAR	RCH	DOV; 3	MAR	NWS	CLT	CAR		66th	675.25	
1972	Bill Seifert	45	Ford																															TWS; 13	66th	675.25	
1973	Donlavey Racing	90	Mercury	RSD	DAY; 8	RCH	CAR	BRI	ATL	NWS	DAR	MAR	TAL; 44	NSV	CLT	DOV																			52nd	0	
1973	Jack Housby	9	Plymouth														TWS; 8	RSD	MCH	DAY	BRI	ATL													52nd	0	
1973	Hoss Ellington	28	Chevy																				TAL; 45	NSV	DAR	RCH	DOV	NWS	MAR	CLT	CAR				52nd	0	
1974	Norris Reed	83	Chevy	RSD	DAY; 3	RCH	CAR	BRI	ATL	DAR	NWS	MAR	TAL; DNQ	NSV	DOV; 9	CLT	RSD	MCH	DAY	BRI	NSV	ATL	POC	TAL; 7	MCH	DAR; 28	RCH	DOV	NWS	MAR	CLT; 19	CAR	ONT; 7		39th	82.95	
1975	Norris Reed	83	Chevy	RSD	DAY; 5	RCH	CAR	BRI	ATL	NWS	DAR	MAR	TAL; 30	NSV	DOV	CLT	RSD	MCH	DAY	NSV	POC	TAL	MCH	DAR	DOV	NWS	MAR	CLT	RCH	CAR	BRI	ATL	ONT		N/A	0	
1976	Norris Reed	83	Chevy	RSD	**DAY**; 26	CAR	RCH	BRI	ATL	NWS	DAR	MAR	TAL	NSV	DOV	CLT	RSD	MCH	DAY	NSV	POC	TAL	MCH	BRI	DAR	RCH	DOV	MAR	NWS	CLT	CAR	ATL	ONT		N/A	0	
1977	Lou Viglione	60	Chevy	RSD	DAY; 27	RCH	CAR	ATL; 15	NWS	DAR	BRI	MAR	TAL; 11	NSV	DOV	CLT; 40	RSD	MCH	DAY; 32	NSV	POC	TAL	MCH	BRI	DAR	RCH	DOV	MAR	NWS	CLT	CAR	ATL	ONT		49th	440	
1984	Barkdoll Racing	38	Buick	DAY; DNQ	RCH	CAR	ATL	BRI	NWS	DAR	MAR	TAL	NSV	DOV	CLT	RSD	POC	MCH	DAY	NSV	POC	TAL	MCH	BRI	DAR	RCH	DOV	MAR	CLT	NWS	CAR	ATL	RSD		N/A	0	

===== Daytona 500 =====
Year	Team	Manufacturer	Start	Finish
1967	Ramo Stott	Plymouth	25	23
1969	Ramo Stott	Plymouth	18	33
1970	Ramo Stott	Plymouth	15	8
1971	Ramo Stott	Plymouth	14	11
1972	Jack Housby	Dodge	24	37
1973	Donlavey Racing	Mercury	16	8
1974	Norris Reed	Chevrolet	12	3
1975	Norris Reed	Chevrolet	31	5
1976	Norris Reed	Chevrolet	**1**	26
1977	Lou Viglione	Chevrolet	12	27
1984	Barkdoll Racing	Chevrolet	DNQ	

Sporting positions
Preceded by Butch Hartman	USAC Stock Car champion 1975	Succeeded by Butch Hartman
Preceded by Benny Parsons	ARCA Series champion 1970–1971	Succeeded by Ron Hutcherson
