= Rick Newsom =

American racing driver (1950–1988)

- Born: March 19, 1950; Fort Mill, South Carolina, U.S.
- Died: August 16, 1988 (aged 38)
- Cause of death: Plane crash

NASCAR Cup Series career
- 82 races run over 14 years
- Best finish: 36th - 1981, 1982 (Winston Cup)
- First race: 1972 Texas 500 (Texas World Speedway)
- Last race: 1986 Miller High Life 500 (Pocono Raceway)
Wins	Top tens	Poles
0	0	0

Rick Newsom (March 19, 1950 – August 16, 1988) was an American NASCAR Winston Cup driver from Fort Mill, South Carolina.

Newsom competed in 82 Winston Cup races from 1972 to 1986.

Newsom was killed in a private plane crash on August 16, 1988.

== Motorsports career results ==
=== NASCAR ===
(key) (Bold – Pole position awarded by qualifying time. Italics – Pole position earned by points standings or practice time. * – Most laps led.)

==== Winston Cup Series ====
NASCAR Winston Cup Series results
Year	Team	No.	Make	1	2	3	4	5	6	7	8	9	10	11	12	13	14	15	16	17	18	19	20	21	22	23	24	25	26	27	28	29	30	31	NWCC	Pts	Ref
1972	Newsom Racing	98	Ford	RSD	DAY	RCH	ONT	CAR	ATL	BRI	DAR	NWS	MAR	TAL	CLT	DOV	MCH	RSD	TWS	DAY	BRI	TRN	ATL	TAL	MCH	NSV	DAR	RCH	DOV	MAR	NWS	CLT	CAR	TWS; 22	91st	289	
1973	Newsom Racing	20	Ford	RSD	DAY; DNQ	RCH	CAR	BRI	ATL	NWS; 30	DAR	MAR; 12	TAL	NSV; 16	CLT; DNQ	DOV; 39	TWS; 34	RSD	MCH; 28	DAY	BRI; 12	ATL; 12	TAL	NSV; 11	DAR	RCH; 13	DOV; 15	NWS	MAR; 32	CLT	CAR				34th	1931	
1974	Newsom Racing	20	Ford	RSD	DAY	RCH	CAR	BRI	ATL	DAR	NWS	MAR	TAL	NSV	DOV	CLT	RSD	MCH	DAY	BRI	NSV	ATL	POC	TAL	MCH	DAR; DNQ	RCH	DOV; 14	NWS; 22	MAR	CLT	CAR	ONT		92nd	2.75	
1975	Newsom Racing	20	Ford	RSD	DAY; 31	RCH; 22	CAR; 19	BRI	ATL; 20	NWS; 24	DAR; 33	MAR	TAL; 41	NSV; 13	DOV	CLT	RSD	MCH; 36	DAY	NSV	POC	TAL	MCH	DAR											37th	877	
1975	Newsom Racing	45	Ford																						DOV; 12	NWS	MAR	CLT	RCH	CAR	BRI	ATL	ONT		37th	877	
1976	Newsom Racing	20	Ford	RSD	DAY	CAR	RCH	BRI	ATL	NWS	DAR	MAR; 18	TAL	NSV; 30	DOV; 20	CLT	RSD	MCH	DAY	NSV	POC	TAL	MCH	BRI			DOV; 30	MAR; 24	NWS	CLT	CAR; 18	ATL	ONT		44th	607	
1976	Newsom Racing	20	Chevy																						DAR; 38	RCH									44th	607	
1977	Newsom Racing	20	Ford	RSD	DAY	RCH; 23	CAR	ATL	NWS; 29	DAR	BRI; 27	MAR	TAL	NSV; 16	DOV; 28	CLT; DNQ	RSD	MCH	DAY	NSV	POC	TAL	MCH	BRI	DAR										48th	446	
1977	Newsom Racing	6	Chevy																							RCH; 28	DOV; 27	MAR	NWS	CLT	CAR	ATL	ONT		48th	446	
1979	Newsom Racing	20	Olds	RSD	DAY	CAR	RCH	ATL	NWS	BRI	DAR	MAR	TAL	NSV	DOV	CLT	TWS	RSD	MCH	DAY; 23	NSV	POC; 26	TAL; 15	MCH	BRI	DAR	RCH	DOV; 35	MAR	CLT	NWS	CAR	ATL	ONT	49th	355	
1980	Newsom Racing	20	Olds	RSD	DAY; DNQ			ATL; 36	BRI	DAR		MAR; 32	TAL	NSV; 26	DOV; 32	CLT	TWS	RSD	MCH	DAY	NSV	POC	TAL	MCH	BRI	DAR	RCH	DOV	NWS	MAR	CLT	CAR	ATL	ONT	44th	483	
1980	Newsom Racing	20	Chevy			RCH; 19	CAR				NWS; 20																								44th	483	
1981	Newsom Racing	20	Chevy	RSD	DAY	RCH; 27	CAR; 32	ATL; 20	BRI; 23	NWS	DAR	MAR	TAL; 33	NSV	DOV	CLT; DNQ	TWS; 28	RSD	MCH	DAY	NSV	POC; 26	TAL	MCH	BRI; 22	DAR	RCH	DOV	MAR	NWS; 22	CLT	CAR	ATL	RSD	37th	768	
1982	Newsom Racing	20	Chevy	DAY	RCH	BRI	ATL	CAR	DAR; 14	NWS; DNQ	MAR	TAL	NSV	DOV	CLT	POC; 17	RSD	MCH	DAY	NSV	POC; 13	TAL	MCH	BRI; 29	DAR; 19	RCH	DOV; 35	NWS	CLT; DNQ	MAR; 31	CAR; 35	ATL; DNQ	RSD		36th	619	
1983	Newsom Racing	20	Chevy	DAY; DNQ	RCH; DNQ	CAR; 28	ATL	DAR; DNQ	NWS; DNQ																										41st	573	
1983	Reeder Racing	02	Buick							MAR; 20	TAL; DNQ	NSV; 23		BRI; 19																					41st	573	
1983	Reeder Racing	02	Chevy										DOV; 14		CLT; 31	RSD	POC	MCH	DAY	NSV	POC	TAL	MCH	BRI	DAR	RCH	DOV	MAR	NWS	CLT	CAR	ATL	RSD		41st	573	
1984	Newsom Racing	20	Chevy	DAY; DNQ	RCH													MCH; DNQ	DAY	NSV	POC	TAL	MCH	BRI	DAR; DNQ	RCH	DOV	MAR	CLT; DNQ	NWS	CAR	ATL	RSD		82nd	76	
1984	Newsom Racing	20	Buick			CAR; 29	ATL	BRI	NWS	DAR	MAR	TAL	NSV	DOV	CLT	RSD	POC																		82nd	76	
1985	Newsom Racing	20	Chevy	DAY; DNQ	RCH; 28							TAL; DNQ	DOV; 21	CLT	RSD																				41st	450	
1985	Newsom Racing	20	Buick			CAR; 36	ATL; DNQ	BRI	DAR	NWS	MAR					POC; 38	MCH	DAY	POC; 21	TAL	MCH	BRI	DAR	RCH	DOV; 32	MAR	NWS	CLT	CAR	ATL	RSD				41st	450	
1986	Newsom Racing	20	Buick	DAY	RCH	CAR; 40	ATL	BRI	DAR	NWS	MAR	TAL	DOV; 25	CLT	RSD	POC; 37	MCH																		69th	183	
1986	Newsom Racing	20	Chevy															DAY; DNQ	POC; DNQ	TAL	GLN	MCH	BRI	DAR	RCH	DOV	MAR	NWS	CLT	CAR	ATL	RSD			69th	183	

===== Daytona 500 =====
Year	Team	Manufacturer	Start	Finish
1973	Newsom Racing	Ford	DNQ	
1975	Newsom Racing	Ford	21	31
1980	Newsom Racing	Oldsmobile	DNQ	
1983	Newsom Racing	Chevrolet	DNQ	
1984	Newsom Racing	Chevrolet	DNQ	
1985	Newsom Racing	Chevrolet	DNQ	
