= 1972 Texas 500 =

Auto race run held at Texas World Speedway in 1972

Coordinates: 30.537°N 96.221°W

Race details
- Race 31 of 31 in the 1972 NASCAR Winston Cup Series season
- Layout of Texas World Speedway
- Date: November 12, 1972
- Official name: Texas 500
- Location: Texas World Speedway, College Station, Texas
- Course: Permanent racing facility
- Course length: 3.218 km (2.000 miles)
- Distance: 250 laps, 500 mi (804.68 km)
- Weather: Mild with temperatures of 75.9 °F (24.4 °C); wind speeds of 10.1 miles per hour (16.3 km/h)
- Average speed: 147.059 miles per hour (236.669 km/h)
- Attendance: 33,000

Pole position
Driver	A. J. Foyt	Wood Brothers Racing

Most laps led
Driver	Buddy Baker	K&K Insurance Racing
- Laps: 133

Winner
No. 71	Buddy Baker	K&K Insurance Racing

Television in the United States
- Network: untelevised
- Announcers: none

The 1972 Texas 500 was a NASCAR Winston Cup Series racing event that took place on November 12, 1972, at Texas World Speedway in College Station, Texas.

== Race report ==
The race was 250 laps on a paved track spanning 2 miles (3.2 km) in front of 33,000 live spectators. It took exactly 3 hours and 24 seconds for Buddy Baker to defeat A. J. Foyt by ½ of a car length. Baker's victory played a role in making 1972 the first NASCAR Cup Series season without any first-time Cup series winners. Foyt had earned the pole position with a speed of 170.273 miles per hour (274.028 km/h) during the qualifying runs even though the actual race speeds approached 147.059 miles per hour (236.669 km/h). Five cautions slowed the race for 29 laps. All the 44 drivers on the racing grid were American-born males.

Bill Seifert of the famous Giachetti Brothers (headed by Richard Giachetti) finished the race in the last-place position due to a clutch problem in the first lap of the race. Bill Champion had engine issues on lap 16 while Earle Canavan had windshield issues on lap 30. Ron Keselowski would ruin his vehicle's engine on lap 38 while Bill Hollar did the same thing on lap 68. Frank Warren would ruin his vehicle's engine on lap 92. Jabe Thomas noticed that his vehicle's suspension acted strangely on lap 93.

H.B. Bailey would lose the rear end of his vehicle on lap 106. Gordon Johncock's engine expired on lap 182. Once Buddy Arrington dropped out with engine failure after completing 184 laps, Petty had locked up a 33rd-place finish. Petty only needed to complete 190 laps to clinch the championship; becoming the champion on lap 191. Clarence Lovell's engine stopped working on lap 196 while Paul Feldner's engine stopped working on lap 198. Larry Smith had identical problems to Lovell and Feldner on lap 199. Johnny Rutherford had to stop racing due to a problematic engine on lap 224.

Seven notable crew chiefs were recorded as participating in the event; including Dale Inman and Harry Hyde. Paul Feldner and Bill Shirey would make their final NASCAR Winston Cup Series starts, while Rick Newsom would make his debut.

Only manual transmission vehicles were allowed to participate in this race; a policy that NASCAR has retained to the present day. Unfortunately, this race broke Bobby Allison's streak of leading a lap from the 1971 Southern 500 all the way to the 1972 American 500. This streak would be known as the "Joe DiMaggio Streak" after the famous baseball player, and it has not been accomplished by any driver after this date.

Individual prize winnings for each driver ranged from the winner's share of $14,920 ($112,155 when considering inflation) to the last-place finishers' share of just $705 ($5,300 when considering inflation). The total prize purse for this racing event was locked in at $88,270 ($663,535 when considering inflation).

=== Qualifying ===
Grid	No.	Driver	Manufacturer	Owner
1	21	A. J. Foyt	'71 Mercury	Wood Brothers
2	71	Buddy Baker	'71 Dodge	Nord Krauskopf
3	43	Richard Petty	'72 Dodge	Petty Enterprises
4	12	Bobby Allison	'72 Chevrolet	Richard Howard
5	04	Hershel McGriff	'72 Plymouth	Beryl Jackson
6	14	Coo Coo Marlin	'72 Chevrolet	H.B. Cunningham
7	22	Gordon Johncock	'72 Plymouth	Crawford Brothers
8	72	Benny Parsons	'71 Mercury	L.G. DeWitt
9	90	Johnny Rutherford	'72 Ford	Junie Donlavey
10	18	Joe Frasson	'72 Dodge	Joe Frasson

== Finishing order ==
Section reference:

1. Buddy Baker
2. A.J. Foyt
3. Richard Petty
4. Bobby Allison
5. Hershel McGriff
6. Benny Parsons
7. Coo Coo Marlin
8. Cecil Gordon
9. Cale Yarborough
10. Joe Frasson
11. James Hylton
12. Dave Marcis
13. Ramo Stott
14. J.D. McDuffie
15. Ben Arnold
16. John Sears
17. Dick Brooks
18. Walter Ballard
19. Jim Whitt
20. Dean Dalton
21. Raymond Williams
22. Rick Newsom
23. Harry Schilling
24. Elmo Langley
25. Ed Negre
26. Johnny Rutherford
27. David Sisco
28. Charlie Roberts
29. Bill Shirey
30. Mel Larson
31. Larry Smith
32. Paul Feldner
33. Clarence Lovell
34. Buddy Arrington
35. Gordon Johncock
36. H.B. Bailey
37. Jabe Thomas
38. Frank Warren
39. Henley Gray
40. Bill Hollar
41. Ron Keselowski
42. Earle Canavan
43. Bill Champion
44. Bill Seifert

Preceded by 1972 American 500	NASCAR Winston Cup Races; 1972-73	Succeeded by 1973 Winston Western 500
