= 1971 Volunteer 500 =

Auto race held at Bristol International Speedway in 1971

Race details
- Race 28 of 48 in the 1971 NASCAR Winston Cup Series season
- Layout of Bristol Motor Speedway
- Date: July 11, 1971
- Official name: Volunteer 500
- Location: Bristol International Speedway, Bristol, Tennessee
- Course: Permanent racing facility
- Course length: 0.533 miles (0.857 km)
- Distance: 500 laps, 266.5 mi (428.8 km)
- Weather: Very hot with temperatures of 87.1 °F (30.6 °C); wind speed of 18.1 miles per hour (29.1 km/h)
- Average speed: 101.074 miles per hour (162.663 km/h)
- Attendance: 20,500

Pole position
Driver	Richard Petty	Petty Enterprises
- Time: 18.346 seconds

Most laps led
Driver	Charlie Glotzbach	Howard & Egerton Racing
- Laps: 411

Winner
No. 17	Charlie Glotzbach	Howard & Egerton Racing

Television in the United States
- Network: untelevised
- Announcers: none

The 1971 Volunteer 500 was a NASCAR Winston Cup Series racing event that took place on July 11, 1971, at Bristol Motor Speedway in Bristol, Tennessee.

The race car drivers still had to commute to the races using the same stock cars that competed in a typical weekend's race through a policy of homologation (and under their own power). This policy was in effect until roughly 1975. By 1980, NASCAR had completely stopped tracking the year model of all the vehicles and most teams did not take stock cars to the track under their own power anymore.

== Race report ==
Thirty American-born drivers competed for 500 laps in a race lasting more than two and a half hours. More than 20,000 people would see Charlie Glotzbach beat Bobby Allison to the checkered line by more than three laps through replacement driver Raymond "Friday" Hassler. He would replace Glotzbach for a few stints of the race as a relief driver because of the immense heat and humidity. Johnny Allen and Jack Smith would do the same thing earlier in 1961; while Fred Lorenzen and Ned Jarrett did it in 1963.

Since Glotzbach qualified for this race, he received credit for what would become his final win in the NASCAR Winston Cup Series. This race was completely clean with no yellow or red flags given out by NASCAR authorities. While the lead was exchanged seven different times in the race, the average speed of the race was clocked at a mere 101.074 miles per hour (162.663 km/h), a track record that would last 53 years until the 2024 Volunteer 500, held on September 21, 2024, where Kyle Larson broke it despite five safety car periods (two for intervals after points-paying laps and three for incidents) at 101.277 miles per hour (162.990 km/h). Chevrolet started to regain their respectability as a fast and reliable vehicle manufacturer after partaking in their first victory since the 1967 Grand National Series season. NASCAR historians would later recognize this win as the first win for the Chevrolet Monte Carlo.

Notable crew chiefs at the race were Junie Donlavey, Dale Inman, Vic Ballard, and Lee Gordon.

Raymond Williams and Dick May would quit the race for reasons unknown. Bill Shirey acquired the last-place finish due to an ignition problem on lap 5. Richard D. Brown noticed that his vehicle's transmission stopped working on lap 15. Wayne Smith crashed his vehicle on lap 18 while Ed Negre fell out with engine failure on lap 40. G.C. Spencer would no longer have a working engine on lap 59. Bill Seifert managed to overheat his vehicle on lap 63. Paul Tyler lost the rear end of his vehicle on lap 70. Friday Hassler lost the wheel bearings on his vehicle on lap 103 while vehicular vibration problems forced Ken Meisenhelder out of the race on lap 131.

A problematic lug bolt sent Dean Dalton out of the race on lap 167. Earl Brooks lost the rear end of his vehicle on lap 168. A faulty spindle eliminated Ron Keselowski out of the race on lap 263 while lug bolt issues sent Bill Dennis out of the race on lap 328. Coo Coo Marlin was the last DNF of the race; having to bow out of the race due to an overheating vehicle on lap 369. The closest battle on the track at the checkered flag was between Jabe Thomas and Walter Ballard for 10th and 11th, 55 laps down.

Richard Petty had the privilege of earning the pole position with a top speed of 104.589 miles per hour (168.320 km/h) in qualifying. Drivers that failed to qualify for this race were: Richard Childress, D.K. Ulrich, Bill Dennis, and Frank Warren. The amount of money in the racing purse was $26,970 ($214,408.18 when adjusted for inflation).

=== Qualifying ===
Grid	No.	Driver	Manufacturer	Qualifying time	Speed	Owner
1	43	Richard Petty	'71 Plymouth	18.346	104.589	Petty Enterprises
2	3	Charlie Glotzbach	'71 Chevrolet	18.368	104.463	Richard Howard
3	12	Bobby Allison	'70 Ford	18.401	104.279	Holman-Moody
4	91	Richard D. Brown	'71 Chevrolet	18.607	103.123	Junior Fields
5	88	Ron Keselowski	'70 Dodge	18.706	102.577	Roger Lubinski
6	49	G.C. Spencer	'69 Plymouth	18.832	101.888	G.C. Spencer
7	07	Coo Coo Marlin	'69 Chevrolet	19.133	100.289	H.B. Cunningham
8	48	James Hylton	'70 Ford	19.158	100.157	James Hylton
9	10	Bill Champion	'71 Ford	19.193	99.972	Bill Champion
10	24	Cecil Gordon	'69 Mercury	19.198	99.946	Cecil Gordon

== Top twenty drivers ==
1. Charlie Glotzbach
2. Bobby Allison
3. Richard Petty
4. Cecil Gordon
5. James Hylton
6. Elmo Langley
7. Frank Warren
8. Bill Champion
9. J.D. McDuffie
10. Jabe Thomas
11. Walter Ballard
12. Henley Gray
13. John Sears
14. Coo Coo Marlin
15. Bill Dennis
16. Don Tarr
17. Ron Keselowski
18. Earl Brooks
19. Dean Dalton
20. Ken Meisenhelder

Preceded by 1971 Medal of Honor Firecracker 400	NASCAR Winston Cup Series Season; 1971	Succeeded by 1971 Albany-Saratoga 250
