= 1972 American 500 =

Auto race held at North Carolina Motor Speedway in 1972

Race details
- Race 30 of 31 in the 1972 NASCAR Winston Cup Series season
- Layout of Rockingham Speedway
- Date: October 22, 1972
- Official name: American 500
- Location: North Carolina Motor Speedway, Rockingham, North Carolina
- Course: Permanent racing facility
- Course length: 1.017 miles (1.636 km)
- Distance: 492 laps, 500 mi (804 km)
- Weather: Mild with temperatures of 71.1 °F (21.7 °C); wind speeds of 5.1 miles per hour (8.2 km/h)
- Average speed: 118.245 miles per hour (190.297 km/h)
- Attendance: 42,000

Pole position
Driver	David Pearson	Wood Brothers Racing
- Time: 26.621

Most laps led
Driver	Bobby Allison	Howard & Egerton Racing
- Laps: 217

Winner
No. 12	Bobby Allison	Howard & Egerton Racing

Television in the United States
- Network: untelevised
- Announcers: none

The 1972 American 500 was a NASCAR Winston Cup Series racing event held on October 22, 1972, at North Carolina Motor Speedway in Rockingham, North Carolina. While not televised, the 1972 American 500 was covered by local radio stations WAYN-AM (900 AM) and WEEB-AM (990 AM).

== Race report ==
40 American-born drivers qualified for the race. Drivers who failed to qualify were David Ray Boggs, Jimmy Crawford and Elmo Langley. Forty-two thousand people attended. The race's average speed was 118.275 miles per hour (190.345 km/h) in this 253-minute race. David Pearson's qualifying speed of 137.258 miles per hour or 220.895 kilometres per hour won the pole position. There were four cautions for a of 35 laps. 20 different drivers lead the race. Bobby Allison would defeat Richard Petty by two laps; resulting in Richard Petty's 100th runner up finish.

Ron Hutcherson was the last-place finisher of this event; with a racing accident on lap 29 out of 492. Richard Petty, Bobby Allison, and David Pearson dominated the closing laps of this race. Pete Hamilton scored his final top-5 finish. This was his final start of 1972 and he would only make two further starts in 1973, both of which ended in DNFs

Hutcherson's racing career would last throughout the course of the 1970s; ending only after the 1979 running of the World 600. Notable crew chiefs for this race were Harry Hyde, Dale Inman, Tom Vandiver, Vic Ballard, and Herb Nab.

Rewards for this race were $19,400 for the winner ($149,320 when adjusted for inflation) while the last-place finisher brought home $550 ($4,233 when adjusted for inflation). A grand total of $89,450 was offered to the race. ($688,487 when adjusted for inflation).

Bobby Allison's win at this event would become the tenth win of the 1972 NASCAR Winston Cup Series season. Due to the cash crunch of the 1970s, only five individual owners could afford to employ a NASCAR Cup Series driver for the rest; the rest were all "proper" NASCAR teams with more than one person running them.

=== Qualifying ===
Grid	No.	Driver	Manufacturer	Qualifying speed	Qualifying time	Owner
1	21	David Pearson	'71 Mercury	137.528	26.621	Wood Brothers
2	71	Buddy Baker	'72 Dodge	136.202	26.881	Nord Krauskopf
3	43	Richard Petty	'72 Plymouth	136.157	26.889	Petty Enterprises
4	9	Pete Hamilton	'72 Plymouth	135.678	26.984	Jack Housby
5	12	Bobby Allison	'72 Chevrolet	135.467	27.026	Richard Howard
6	28	Cale Yarborough	'72 Chevrolet	134.664	27.188	Hoss Ellington
7	15	Dick Brooks	'72 Ford	134.491	27.223	Bud Moore
8	17	Bill Dennis	'72 Chevrolet	133.730	27.377	H.J. Brooking
9	27	Bobby Isaac	'71 Chevrolet	133.045	27.518	Banjo Matthews
10	16	Dave Marcis	'72 AMC Matador	132.837	27.561	Roger Penske

== Finishing order ==
1. Bobby Allison
2. Richard Petty
3. Buddy Baker
4. David Pearson
5. Pete Hamilton
6. Cale Yarborough
7. Dave Marcis
8. Larry Smith
9. David Sisco
10. Buddy Arrington
11. John Sears
12. Clarence Lovell
13. Elmo Langley
14. Ben Arnold
15. Walter Ballard
16. Dean Dalton
17. Ed Negre
18. Charlie Roberts
19. James Hylton
20. Cecil Gordon
21. Joe Frasson
22. Raymond Williams
23. Jabe Thomas
24. J.D. McDuffie
25. Frank Warren
26. Marty Robbins
27. Coo Coo Marlin
28. Bill Champion
29. Roy Mayne
30. Jim Vandiver
31. Neil Castles
32. Bill Dennis
33. Ron Keselowski
34. Dick Brooks
35. Benny Parsons
36. Bobby Isaac
37. Henley Gray
38. Tiny Lund
39. Tommy Gale
40. Ron Hutcherson

== Timeline ==
Section reference:

- Start: David Pearson was the first driver to leave the start/finish line as the green flag was waved in the air.
- Lap 32: First caution due to Ron Hutcherson's accident on turn 4, ended on lap 42.
- Lap 33: Bill Dennis took over the lead from David Pearson.
- Lap 34: Bobby Isaac took over the lead from Bill Dennis.
- Lap 35: Bobby Allison took over the lead from Bobby Isaac.
- Lap 42: Cale Yarborough took over the lead from Bobby Allison.
- Lap 51: Buddy Baker took over the lead from Cale Yarborough.
- Lap 66: Second caution due to Henley Gray's engine failure, ended on lap 75.
- Lap 67: Dick Brooks took over the lead from Buddy Baker.
- Lap 68: Bill Dennis took over the lead from Dick Brooks.
- Lap 69: David Pearson took over the lead from Bill Dennis.
- Lap 91: The third caution started due to Benny Parson's accident on turn 1, ended on lap 101.
- Lap 92: Bobby Allison took over the lead from David Pearson.
- Lap 97: David Pearson took over the lead from Bobby Allison.
- Lap 100: Buddy Baker took over the lead from David Pearson.
- Lap 167: David Pearson took over the lead from Buddy Baker.
- Lap 187: Bobby Allison took over the lead from David Pearson.
- Lap 213: Richard Petty took over the lead from Bobby Allison.
- Lap 250: The fourth caution started due to debris, ended on lap 256.
- Lap 251: Bobby Allison took over the lead from Richard Petty.
- Lap 252: Richard Petty took over the lead from Bobby Allison.
- Lap 259: Bobby Allison took over the lead from Richard Petty.
- Lap 261: Richard Petty took over the lead from Bobby Allison.
- Lap 269: David Pearson took over the lead from Richard Petty.
- Lap 317: Bobby Allison took over the lead from David Pearson.
- Lap 418: Jabe Thomas' engine stopped functioning in a normal manner.
- Lap 428: The rear end of James Hylton's vehicle was removed in an unsafe manner.
- Finish: Bobby Allison was officially declared the winner of the event.

Preceded by 1972 National 500	NASCAR Winston Cup Series Season; 1972	Succeeded by 1972 Texas 500

Preceded by 1971	American 500 races 1972	Succeeded by 1973
