= 1972 Carolina 500 =

Auto race held at North Carolina Motor Speedway in 1972

Race details
- Race 5 of 31 in the 1972 NASCAR Winston Cup Series season
- Layout of Rockingham Speedway
- Date: March 12, 1972
- Official name: Carolina 500
- Location: North Carolina Motor Speedway, Rockingham, North Carolina
- Course: Permanent racing facility
- Course length: 1.017 miles (1.636 km)
- Distance: 492 laps, 500 mi (804 km)
- Weather: Temperatures of 48.7 °F (9.3 °C); wind speeds of 13.00 miles per hour (20.92 km/h)
- Average speed: 113.895 miles per hour (183.296 km/h)

Pole position
Driver	Bobby Isaac	K&K Insurance Racing

Most laps led
Driver	Bobby Isaac	K&K Insurance Racing
- Laps: 210

Winner
No. 3	Bobby Isaac	K&K Insurance Racing

Television in the United States
- Network: ABC
- Announcers: Keith Jackson, Chris Economaki

The 1972 Carolina 500 was a NASCAR Winston Cup Series race that took place on March 12, 1972, at North Carolina Motor Speedway in Rockingham, North Carolina.

ABC tape-delayed coverage of this race until March 18, 1972, when it was shown as ABC Championship Auto Racing and abbreviated to 90 minutes including commercials.

== Race report ==
The race took place on a paved track spanning 1.017 miles (1.637 km), it took four hours and twenty-three minutes to complete all 492 laps of the race. Bobby Isaac defeated Richard Petty by at one lap in front of 42500 people; marking his final career win. Isaac would earn the pole position with a qualifying speed of 137.539 miles per hour (221.348 km/h). Meanwhile, the average race speed was 113.895 miles per hour (183.296 km/h). Eight cautions slowed the race for 57 laps. Jimmy Vandiver finished in 3rd place with a ragtag crew of repairmen who had never worked a NASCAR race before and were assembled just hours before the race began; he improved on his qualifying position of 16th place even though he was unable to lead any laps.

Baker only added this race at the last minute because there were so few other big teams. Baker broke a valve Spring in his 426 wedge and fell out early. Allison dominated the first half of the race and then blew up. Petty had several cut tires and finally broke a rear spring. That left Issac who was running a highly restricted 426 Hemi a clear path to the win.

British-born competitor Jackie Oliver finished in last place due to an engine issue on the first lap while Canadian-born Les Covey would fail to finish due to a clutch problem on lap 127. The rest of the 40-car grid was American-born drivers. NASCAR noticed that Allison's car had right side tires on the left side and vice versa after qualifying and told Junior to switch them, he wouldn't because NASCAR didn't even look at any other team, so they put the car in the back to start.

Neil Castles would record his final top ten in his NASCAR Cup Series career.

Notable crew chiefs at this race; included Harry Hyde, Dale Inman, Tom Vandiver and Lee Gordon.

=== Qualifying ===
Grid	No.	Driver	Manufacturer	Owner
1	71	Bobby Isaac	'72 Dodge	Nord Krauskopf
2	43	Richard Petty	'72 Plymouth	Petty Enterprises
3	72	Benny Parsons	'71 Ford	L.G. DeWitt
4	11	Buddy Baker	'72 Dodge	Petty Enterprises
5	2	Dave Marcis	'70 Dodge	Dave Marcis
6	93	Buck Baker	'72 Chevrolet	Harold Furr
7	18	Joe Frasson	'70 Dodge	Joe Frasson
8	64	Elmo Langley	'71 Ford	Elmo Langley
9	45	LeeRoy Yarbrough	'71 Ford	Bill Seifert
10	90	Jackie Oliver	'71 Ford	Junie Donlavey

== Finishing order ==
Section reference:

1. Bobby Isaac (No. 71)
2. Richard Petty (No. 43)
3. Jim Vandiver (No. 31)
4. LeeRoy Yarbrough (No. 45)
5. Dave Marcis (No. 2)
6. James Hylton (No. 48)
7. Benny Parsons (No. 72)
8. Buddy Arrington (No. 67)
9. Elmo Langley (No. 64)
10. Neil Castles (No. 06)
11. Larry Smith (No. 92)
12. Joe Frasson (No. 18)
13. Jabe Thomas (No. 25)
14. Ed Negre (No. 8)
15. Ben Arnold (No. 76)
16. John Sears (No. 4)
17. David Ray Boggs (No. 57)
18. Dean Dalton (No. 7)
19. Frank Warren (No. 79)
20. Henley Gray (No. 19)
21. H.B. Bailey (No. 53)
22. George Altheide (No. 0)
23. Richard D. Brown (No. 91)
24. Charlie Roberts (No. 77)
25. Ron Keselowski (No. 88)
26. Cecil Gordon* (No. 24)
27. Bobby Allison* (No. 12)
28. Johnny Halford* (No. 32)
29. Bill Champion* (No. 10)
30. G.C. Spencer* (No. 49)
31. Bill Shirey* (No. 74)
32. Walter Ballard* (No. 65)
33. Les Covey* (No. 89)
34. Buddy Baker* (No. 11)
35. Raymond Williams* (No. 47)
36. Buck Baker* (No. 93)
37. Richard Childress* (No. 96)
38. Dub Simpson* (No. 51)
39. Bobby Mausgrover* (No. 00)
40. Jackie Oliver* (No. 90)

* Driver failed to finish race

== Timeline ==
Section reference:

- Start of race: Bobby Isaac had the pole position to begin the first official lap.
- Lap 10: Bobby Mausgrover could not get his ignition working in a safe and proper manner.
- Lap 11: Dub Simpson became the first driver in the event to blow his engine.
- Lap 14: Richard Petty took over the lead from Bobby Isaac.
- Lap 23: Bobby Isaac took over the lead from Richard Petty.
- Lap 56: Richard Childress blew his engine while driving at high speeds.
- Lap 59: Buck Baker managed to blow his engine while racing at high speeds.
- Lap 68: Bobby Allison took over the lead from Bobby Isaac.
- Lap 69: Buddy Baker took over the lead from Bobby Allison.
- Lap 79: Bobby Allison took over the lead from Buddy Baker.
- Lap 85: Water pump issues would unfortunately force Raymond Williams out of the event in poor form.
- Lap 90: Buddy Baker managed to blow up his engine while driving at high speeds.
- Lap 127: Clutch issues would force Canadian Les Covey out of the race.
- Lap 129: Bobby Isaac took over the lead from Bobby Allison.
- Lap 130: Bobby Allison took over the lead from Bobby Isaac.
- Lap 167: Walter Ballard would lose the rear end of his vehicle, forcing his exit for safety reasons.
- Lap 177: Bill Shirey's vehicle had a terminal clutch problem.
- Lap 179: Bobby Isaac took over the lead from Bobby Allison.
- Lap 186: Bobby Allison took over the lead from Bobby Isaac.
- Lap 259: Engine problems would grind G.C. Spencer's day to a halt.
- Lap 307: Bill Champion had a terminal crash, forcing him to retire from the event prematurely.
- Lap 345: Engine troubles would prevent Bobby Allison from a respectable finish at the event.
- Lap 346: Bobby Isaac took over the lead from Bobby Allison.
- Lap 379: Richard Petty took over the lead from Bobby Isaac.
- Lap 382: Bobby Isaac took over the lead from Richard Petty.
- Lap 409: Cecil Gordon's vehicle suffered from terminal engine problems.
- Finish: Bobby Isaac was officially declared the winner of the event.

Preceded by 1972 Miller High Life 500	NASCAR Winston Cup Series Season; 1972	Succeeded by 1972 Atlanta 500
