= Walter Ballard =

American racecar driver (1933–2024)

- Born: Walter Harvey Ballard Sr. January 12, 1933; Foley, Alabama, U.S.
- Died: October 26, 2024 (aged 91); Kingwood, Texas, U.S.
- Awards: 1971 NASCAR Winston Cup Series Rookie of the Year

NASCAR Cup Series career
- 176 races run over 9 years
- Best finish: 6th (1972)
- First race: 1966 Rebel 400 (Darlington)
- Last race: 1977 Wilkes 400 (North Wilkesboro)
| Wins | Top tens | Poles |
|---|---|---|
| 0 | 34 | 0 |

Walter Harvey Ballard Sr. (January 12, 1933 – October 26, 2024) was an American NASCAR driver from Houston, Texas. In 1971, he won the Rookie of the Year Award in the NASCAR Winston Cup Grand National Series (known as the NASCAR Cup Series as of 2021), in its first year under Winston's sponsorship.

== NASCAR Winston Cup Series ==
Ballard made his first start in the Winston Cup Series — then known as the Grand National Series — in 1966, but did not race in the series again until 1971.

In 1971, Ballard ran a nearly-full season in a car owned by his father, Vic, capturing 11 top-tens, a tenth-place finish in points, and the Rookie of the Year Award.

In the 1972 Daytona 500, Ballard's car flipped in the race. On lap 19 of the race, his car ramped over Buddy Baker's car on the front stretch wall and flipped over where it flipped another two times in the grass before landing on all four wheels. Ballard and Baker were both unscathed. Despite the flip, Ballard had an even better season in 1972, collecting seven top-tens and a sixth-place finish in points. He continued to race full-time with his family-owned team until 1975, and competed part-time in the 1976 and 1977 seasons before retiring from the series after 1977.

Ballard's best result in the Winston Cup Series was a third-place finish in the 1971 Space City 300 at Meyer Speedway in Houston, Texas.

== Other NASCAR series ==
Ballard also drove six races in the NASCAR Grand National East Series from 1972 to 1973, collecting one top-ten in 1972, and attempted two races in the NASCAR Winston West Series in 1971 and 1976, failing to qualify for both.

== Personal life and death ==
In 1979, Ballard started an automotive repair business with his sons Daniel, Stoney and Clint, retiring in November 2005. As of 2007, he resided in Charlotte, North Carolina. His wife Katy died in 2019.

Ballard died in Kingwood, Texas, on October 26, 2024, at the age of 91.

== Motorsports Career Results ==
=== NASCAR ===
(key) (Bold – Pole position awarded by qualifying time. Italics – Pole position earned by points standings or practice time. * – Most laps led.)

==== Grand National Series ====
NASCAR Grand National Series results
| Year | Team | No. | Make | 1 | 2 | 3 | 4 | 5 | 6 | 7 | 8 | 9 | 10 | 11 | 12 | 13 | 14 | 15 | 16 | 17 | 18 | 19 | 20 | 21 | 22 | 23 | 24 | 25 | 26 | 27 | 28 | 29 | 30 | 31 | 32 | 33 | 34 | 35 | 36 | 37 | 38 | 39 | 40 | 41 | 42 | 43 | 44 | 45 | 46 | 47 | 48 | 49 | NGNC | Pts | Ref |
|---|---|---|---|---|---|---|---|---|---|---|---|---|---|---|---|---|---|---|---|---|---|---|---|---|---|---|---|---|---|---|---|---|---|---|---|---|---|---|---|---|---|---|---|---|---|---|---|---|---|---|---|---|---|---|---|
| 1966 | Ballard Racing | 30 | Ford | AUG | RSD | DAY | DAY | DAY | CAR | BRI | ATL | HCY | CLB | GPS | BGS | NWS | MAR | DAR; 20 | LGY | MGR | MON | RCH | CLT | DTS | ASH | PIF | SMR | AWS | BLV | GPS | DAY | ODS | BRR | OXF | FON | ISP | BRI | SMR | NSV | ATL | CLB | AWS | BLV | BGS | DAR | HCY | RCH | HBO | MAR | NWS | CLT | CAR | 84th | 560 | |
| 1971 | Ballard Racing | 30 | Ford | RSD | DAY | DAY; 23 | DAY; DNQ | ONT; DNQ | RCH; 30 | CAR | HCY | BRI; 25 | ATL; 39 | CLB; 13 | GPS; 11 | SMR; 12 | NWS; 17 | MAR; 25 | DAR; 16 | SBO; 4 | TAL; 22 | ASH; 13 | KPT; 7 | CLT; 40 | DOV; 10 | MCH; 17 | RSD | HOU; 3 | GPS; 5 | DAY; 32 | BRI; 11 | AST; 13 | ISP; 10 | TRN; 12 | NSV; 6 | ATL; 18 | BGS; 10 | ONA; 8 | MCH; 20 | TAL; 22 | CLB; 8 | HCY; 21 | DAR; 29 | MAR; 16 | CLT; 20 | DOV; 9 | CAR; 22 | MGR; 12 | RCH; 11 | NWS; 13 | TWS; 39 | | 10th | 2633 | |

==== Winston Cup Series ====
NASCAR Winston Cup Series results
| Year | Team | No. | Make | 1 | 2 | 3 | 4 | 5 | 6 | 7 | 8 | 9 | 10 | 11 | 12 | 13 | 14 | 15 | 16 | 17 | 18 | 19 | 20 | 21 | 22 | 23 | 24 | 25 | 26 | 27 | 28 | 29 | 30 | 31 | NWCC | Pts | Ref |
|---|---|---|---|---|---|---|---|---|---|---|---|---|---|---|---|---|---|---|---|---|---|---|---|---|---|---|---|---|---|---|---|---|---|---|---|---|---|
| 1972 | Ballard Racing | 30 | Ford | RSD; 14 | DAY; 36 | | | CAR; DNQ | ATL; 26 | BRI; 11 | | | | | | | | | | | | | | | | | | | | | | | | | 6th | 6781.45 | |
| 1972 | Ballard Racing | 30 | Plymouth | | | RCH; 21 | ONT; 47 | | | | | | | | | | | | | | | | | | | | | | | | | | | | 6th | 6781.45 | |
| 1972 | Joe Phipps | 65 | Chevy | | | | | CAR; 32 | | | | | | | | | | | | | | | | | | | | | | | | | | | 6th | 6781.45 | |
| 1972 | Ballard Racing | 30 | Mercury | | | | | | | | DAR; 18 | NWS; 9 | MAR; 9 | TAL; 19 | CLT; 15 | DOV; 16 | MCH; 12 | RSD; 25 | TWS; 33 | DAY; 23 | BRI; 9 | TRN; 10 | ATL; 10 | TAL; 15 | MCH; 11 | NSV; 9 | DAR; 12 | RCH; 12 | DOV; 8 | MAR; 20 | NWS; 19 | CLT; 19 | CAR; 15 | TWS; 18 | 6th | 6781.45 | |
| 1973 | Ballard Racing | 30 | Plymouth | RSD; 19 | | | | | | | | | | | | | | | | | | | | | | | | | | | | | | | 8th | 5955.7 | |
| 1973 | Ballard Racing | 30 | Chevy | | DAY; 19 | | | | | | | | | | | | | | | | | | | | | | | | | | | | | | 8th | 5955.7 | |
| 1973 | Ballard Racing | 30 | Mercury | | | RCH; 11 | CAR; 39 | BRI; 17 | ATL; 14 | NWS; 18 | DAR; 25 | MAR; 8 | TAL; 48 | NSV; 22 | CLT; 18 | DOV; 28 | TWS; 16 | RSD; 15 | MCH; 30 | DAY; 26 | BRI; 14 | ATL; 15 | TAL; 9 | NSV; 7 | DAR; 17 | RCH; 6 | DOV; 17 | NWS; 13 | MAR; 18 | CLT; 23 | CAR; 22 | | | | 8th | 5955.7 | |
| 1974 | Ballard Racing | 30 | Chevy | RSD | DAY; 10 | RCH; 19 | CAR; 6 | BRI; 14 | ATL | DAR; 40 | NWS; 12 | MAR; 11 | TAL; 24 | NSV; 21 | DOV; 22 | CLT; 12 | RSD | MCH; 35 | DAY; 20 | BRI; 10 | NSV; 26 | ATL; 13 | | TAL; 48 | MCH; 24 | DAR; 16 | RCH; 5 | DOV; 10 | NWS; 9 | MAR; 25 | CLT; 12 | CAR; 15 | ONT; 16 | | 15th | 748.44 | |
| 1974 | Ed Hawks | 75 | Chevy | | | | | | | | | | | | | | | | | | | | POC; 29 | | | | | | | | | | | | 15th | 748.44 | |
| 1975 | Ballard Racing | 30 | Chevy | RSD; 31 | DAY; 25 | | CAR; 17 | BRI; 18 | ATL; 24 | NWS; 10 | DAR; 18 | MAR; 15 | TAL; 12 | NSV; 10 | DOV; 25 | CLT; 10 | RSD; 24 | MCH; 11 | | NSV; 18 | | TAL; 48 | MCH; 11 | DAR; 25 | DOV; 14 | NWS; 25 | MAR; 14 | CLT; 41 | RCH; 15 | CAR; 11 | BRI; 12 | ATL; 17 | ONT; 20 | | 11th | 3151 | |
| 1975 | Champion Racing | 10 | Ford | | | RCH; 19 | | | | | | | | | | | | | | | | | | | | | | | | | | | | | 11th | 3151 | |
| 1975 | Tom Williams | 38 | Chevy | | | | | | | | | | | | | | | | DAY; 31 | | | | | | | | | | | | | | | | 11th | 3151 | |
| 1975 | Dalton Racing | 7 | Ford | | | | | | | | | | | | | | | | | | POC; 13 | | | | | | | | | | | | | | 11th | 3151 | |
| 1976 | Ballard Racing | 30 | Chevy | RSD | DAY | CAR; 25 | RCH; 14 | BRI; 19 | | NWS; 10 | DAR | MAR; 9 | TAL | NSV; 8 | DOV; 16 | | | | | | | | | | | | | | | | | | ONT; DNQ | | 26th | 1554 | |
| 1976 | Ballard Racing | 29 | Chevy | | | | | | ATL; 24 | | | | | | | | | | | | | | | | | | | | | | | | | | 26th | 1554 | |
| 1976 | Hollar Racing | 29 | Chevy | | | | | | | | | | | | | CLT; 22 | RSD | MCH; 31 | DAY | NSV | | | | | | | | | | | | | | | 26th | 1554 | |
| 1976 | Negre Racing | 82 | Dodge | | | | | | | | | | | | | | | | | | POC; 37 | TAL | MCH | | | | | | | | | | | | 26th | 1554 | |
| 1976 | Price Racing | 45 | Chevy | | | | | | | | | | | | | | | | | | | | | BRI; 26 | DAR | RCH; 22 | DOV; 16 | MAR | NWS | CLT | CAR | ATL | | | 26th | 1554 | |
| 1977 | Ballard Racing | 03 | Chevy | RSD | DAY; 19 | | | | | | | | | | | | | | | | | | | | | | | | | | | | | | 55th | 318 | |
| 1977 | Price Racing | 45 | Chevy | | | RCH; 22 | CAR | ATL | NWS | DAR | BRI | MAR | TAL | NSV | DOV | CLT | RSD | MCH | DAY | NSV | POC | TAL | MCH | BRI | DAR | RCH | DOV | MAR | | | | | | | 55th | 318 | |
| 1977 | Ballard Racing | 30 | Chevy | | | | | | | | | | | | | | | | | | | | | | | | | | NWS; 16 | CLT | CAR | ATL | ONT | | 55th | 318 | |
| 1978 | Ballard Racing | 30 | Chevy | RSD | DAY | RCH | CAR | ATL | BRI | DAR | NWS | MAR; QL^{†} | TAL | DOV | CLT | NSV | RSD | MCH | DAY | | | | | | | | | | | | | | | | NA | - | |
| 1978 | Hylton Motorsports | 48 | Chevy | | | | | | | | | | | | | | | | | NSV; 30 | POC | TAL | MCH | BRI | DAR | RCH | DOV | MAR | NWS | CLT | CAR | ATL | ONT | | NA | - | |
^{†} – Replaced by Tighe Scott
