= Dean Dalton =

American racing driver (born 1945)

- Born: June 18, 1945 (age 81); Asheville, North Carolina, U.S.

NASCAR Cup Series career
- 117 races run over 7 years
- Best finish: 9th (1972)
- First race: 1971 Miller High Life 500 (Ontario)
- Last race: 1977 American 500 (Rockingham)
Wins	Top tens	Poles
0	10	0
- Statistics up to date as of November 4, 2024.

Dean Dalton (born June 18, 1945) is an American former professional stock car racing driver who has previously competed in the NASCAR Winston Cup Series, where he earned ten top-ten finishes with a best finish of sixth at Darlington Raceway in 1973.

Dalton also competed in the NASCAR Grand National East Series and the USAC Stock Car Series.

== Motorsports career results ==
=== NASCAR ===
(key) (Bold - Pole position awarded by qualifying time. Italics - Pole position earned by points standings or practice time. * – Most laps led.)

==== Grand National Series ====
NASCAR Grand National Series results
Year	Team	No.	Make	1	2	3	4	5	6	7	8	9	10	11	12	13	14	15	16	17	18	19	20	21	22	23	24	25	26	27	28	29	30	31	32	33	34	35	36	37	38	39	40	41	42	43	44	45	46	47	48	NGNC	Pts	Ref
1971	Dean Dalton	17	Ford	RSD	DAY	DAY	DAY	ONT; 51	RCH	CAR	HCY	BRI																																								30th	1276	
1971	Dean Dalton	7	Ford										ATL; 23	CLB; 22	GPS	SMR; 15	NWS	MAR	DAR; 19	SBO; 16	TAL; 20	ASH; 18	KPT	CLT	DOV; 13	MCH; 20	RSD	HOU	GPS; 10	DAY; 22	BRI; 19	AST	ISP	TRN	NSV; 13	ATL	BGS	ONA	MCH; 28	TAL; 25	CLB	HCY	DAR; 22	MAR; 21	CLT	DOV; 40	CAR	MGR	RCH	NWS	TWS; 35	30th	1276	

==== Winston Cup Series ====
NASCAR Winston Cup Series results
Year	Team	No.	Make	1	2	3	4	5	6	7	8	9	10	11	12	13	14	15	16	17	18	19	20	21	22	23	24	25	26	27	28	29	30	31	NWCC	Pts	Ref
1972	Dean Dalton	7	Mercury	RSD	DAY; DNQ	RCH; 25	ONT; 25	CAR; 18	ATL; 28	BRI; 13	DAR; 12	NWS; 15	MAR; 14	TAL; 22	CLT; 17	DOV; 13	MCH; 8	RSD; 22	TWS; 9	DAY; 31	BRI; 20	TRN; 12	ATL; 37	TAL; 12	MCH; 23	NSV; 23	DAR; 21	RCH; 8	DOV; 9	MAR; 28	NWS; 15	CLT; 24	CAR; 16	TWS; 20	9th	6295.05	
1973	Dean Dalton	7	Mercury	RSD	DAY; DNQ	RCH; 27	CAR; 26	BRI; 27	ATL; 23	NWS; 17	DAR; 6	MAR; 29	TAL; 16	NSV; 15	CLT; 30	DOV; 9	TWS; 22	RSD; 40	MCH; 23	DAY; 17	BRI; 23	ATL; 22	TAL; 17	NSV; 27	DAR; 19	RCH; 31	DOV; DNQ			CLT; 30	CAR; 23				19th	4712.3	
1973	Bill Hollar	29	Mercury																								DOV; 34								19th	4712.3	
1973	Charlie Roberts	7	Ford																									NWS; 19	MAR; 20						19th	4712.3	
1974	Dean Dalton	7	Chevy	RSD	DAY; DNQ	RCH; 28	CAR; 33	BRI; 24	ATL	DAR	NWS; 29	MAR; 14	TAL; 49	NSV; 15	DOV; 13	CLT	RSD	MCH; 21	DAY; 12			ATL; 29	POC; 32	TAL; Wth	MCH	DAR	RCH	DOV	NWS	MAR	CLT	CAR	ONT		36th	125.44	
1974	Henley Gray	19	Chevy																	BRI; 28	NSV; 15														36th	125.44	
1975	Dean Dalton	7	Ford	RSD	DAY	RCH	CAR; 10	BRI	ATL	NWS	DAR; 32				DOV; 17	CLT; 17	RSD	MCH; 19	DAY	NSV	POC	TAL; 11	MCH; 10	DAR; 32	DOV; 9	NWS; 15	MAR	CLT	RCH; 19	CAR	BRI; 29				26th	1486	
1975	Ed Negre	8	Dodge									MAR; 30	TAL; 39	NSV																					26th	1486	
1975	Dean Dalton	10	Ford																													ATL; 32	ONT		26th	1486	
1976	Dean Dalton	7	Chevy	RSD	DAY	CAR	RCH	BRI	ATL	NWS	DAR	MAR	TAL	NSV	DOV; 29	CLT	RSD	MCH	DAY	NSV	POC; 15	TAL	MCH; 18	BRI; 28	DAR; 11	RCH; 14	DOV	MAR	NWS	CLT	CAR	ATL	ONT; DNQ		42nd	633	
1977	Dean Dalton	7	Chevy	RSD; DNQ	DAY	RCH	CAR	ATL; 37	NWS	DAR; 35	BRI	MAR	TAL	NSV; 30	DOV; 34	CLT	RSD	MCH	DAY	NSV	POC	TAL											ONT; DNQ		43rd	620	
1977	Don Robertson	25	Chevy																				MCH; 21												43rd	620	
1977	Langley Racing	64	Ford																					BRI; 23	DAR	RCH									43rd	620	
1977	Dean Dalton	7	Dodge																								DOV; 29	MAR	NWS	CLT					43rd	620	
1977	Champion Racing	10	Ford																												CAR; 19	ATL			43rd	620	

===== Daytona 500 =====
Year	Team	Manufacturer	Start	Finish
1972	Dean Dalton	Mercury	DNQ	
1973	Dean Dalton	Mercury	DNQ	
1974	Dean Dalton	Chevrolet	DNQ	
