= Keselowski =

Keselowski is a surname. Notable people with the name include:

- Bob Keselowski (1951–2021), American stock car racing driver
- Brad Keselowski (born 1984), American stock car racing driver, son of Bob
- Brian Keselowski (born 1981), American stock car racing driver, brother of Brad
- Ron Keselowski (born 1946), American stock car racing driver, uncle of Brad and Brian, and brother of Bob
