= Lone Star 500 =

There have been two races named Lone Star 500:

- Lone Star 500 (NASCAR), a NASCAR Winston Cup Series race run at Texas World Speedway in June 1972
- Lone Star 500 (IRL), a Pep Boys Indy Racing League race run at Texas Motor Speedway in September 1998
