= 1972 Daytona 500 =

Auto race run in Florida in 1972

Race details
- Race 2 of 31 in the 1972 NASCAR Winston Cup Series
- 1972 Daytona 500 program cover
- Date: February 20, 1972
- Location: Daytona International Speedway; Daytona Beach, Florida, U.S.
- Course: Permanent racing facility 2.5 mi (4.023 km)
- Distance: 200 laps, 500 mi (804.672 km)
- Weather: Temperatures reaching up to 57 °F (14 °C); wind speeds approaching 15.9 miles per hour (25.6 km/h)
- Average speed: 161.55 miles per hour (259.99 km/h)

Pole position
Driver	Bobby Isaac	Nord Krauskopf

Qualifying race winners
Duel 1 Winner	Bobby Isaac	Nord Krauskopf
Duel 2 Winner	Bobby Allison	Richard Howard

Most laps led
Driver	A. J. Foyt	Wood Brothers Racing
- Laps: 167

Winner
No. 21	A. J. Foyt	Wood Brothers Racing

Television in the United States
- Network: ABC Wide World of Sports
- Announcers: Keith Jackson, Chris Economaki

The 1972 Daytona 500, the 14th running of the event, was held on February 20, 1972, at Daytona International Speedway in Daytona Beach, Florida. A. J. Foyt, driving a 1971 Mercury, won the race.

It was the first Daytona 500 starts for David Sisco and Walter Ballard. It was the only Daytona 500 start for Richard D. Brown, George Altheide, David Ray Boggs, Ed Hessert, Larry Dickson, Jimmy Finger, Mark Donohue, and Raymond Williams. It was the last Daytona 500 starts for Vic Elford, Henley Grey, Ben Arnold, Bill Seifert, Elmo Langley, and Bill Champion.

== Summary ==
Foyt drove his number 21 to victory after starting the race from the outside front-row position. There were three cautions flags which slowed the race for a total of 17 laps. Foyt dominated the event, winning by almost two laps over his closest competitor. The victory over Charlie Glotzbach was Foyt's first win of the season.

The 1972 Daytona 500 has the distinction of being the event which had the fewest leaders for a NASCAR race held at Daytona International Speedway; with only Foyt, Richard Petty, and Bobby Allison recorded as leading a lap during the competition. The Daytona 500 was the second event held during the 1972 season, and completed in three hours and five minutes with an average speed of 161 mph. There were a total of 13 lead changes between Foyt, Allison, and Petty throughout the race.

Foyt's victory would earn him a spot on the cover of Sports Illustrated, the first time for a reigning Daytona 500 champion.

Walter Ballard had a serious crash in this race on lap 16 as a result of colliding with Buddy Baker in the tri-oval. Baker himself would retire from the race on lap 18. Ballard went upside down after climbing the nose of Baker's car. He rolled into the tri-oval grass and barrel rolled 3 times before coming back onto all fours. Both drivers were uninjured.

Raymond Williams earned the dubious honor of being the only driver ever to both begin and finish in last-place in the same Daytona 500. Also, attrition was through the roof in this race, as only 26 cars even made it 200 miles, just 22 cars ran at least half the race, and just 19 made it 110 laps. Also, the distances between some of the leading finishers were just astounding. Third-place finisher Jim Vandiver (and fourth-place Benny Parsons) was six laps/15 miles behind the winner, fifth-place James Hylton was 9 laps/22.5 miles behind, sixth-place Cale Yarborough was 12 laps/30 miles or 6% of the race distance behind, and 10th-place finisher Vic Elford was 18 laps/45 miles or 9% of the race distance behind Foyt.

Bobby Isaac won the pole but A.J. Foyt overtook him right at the start although the two fought for the lead on the first lap. As Foyt pulled away Issac's day turned out to be a short one as engine problems put the K&K Insurance Dodge on the trailer before the 10 percent mark of the race.

== Race results ==
Pos	Grid	No.	Driver	Entrant	Manufacturer	Laps	Winnings	Laps led	Time/Status
1	2	21	A. J. Foyt	Wood Brothers Racing	1971 Mercury	200	$45,400	167	3:05:42
2	6	6	Charlie Glotzbach	Cotton Owens	1971 Dodge	199	$16,250	0	+1 Lap
3	8	31	Jim Vandiver	O. L. Nixon	1970 Dodge	194	$10,475	0	+6 Laps
4	33	72	Benny Parsons	L. G. DeWitt	1970 Mercury	194	$7,150	0	+6 Laps
5	35	48	James Hylton	James Hylton	1971 Ford	191	$5,925	0	+9 Laps
6	16	3	Cale Yarborough	Ray Fox	1971 Plymouth	188	$4,660	0	+12 Laps
7	23	05	David Sisco	Charlie McGee	1972 Chevrolet	186	$4,215	0	+14 Laps
8	21	25	Jabe Thomas	Don Robertson	1970 Plymouth	184	$4,365	0	+16 Laps
9	15	4	John Sears	J. Marvin Mills	1970 Plymouth	183	$4,145	0	+17 Laps
10	13	23	Vic Elford	Don Robertson	1970 Plymouth	182	$3,445	0	+18 Laps
11	26	03	Tommy Gale	Frank Vasko	1971 Mercury	182	$2,405	0	+18 Laps
12	38	64	Elmo Langley	Elmo Langley	1971 Ford	181	$2,700	0	+19 Laps
13	5	91	Richard D. Brown	Ralph McNabb	1972 Chevrolet	179	$3,525	0	+21 Laps
14	37	19	Henley Gray	Henley Gray	1971 Ford	179	$2,395	0	+21 Laps
15	34	0	George Altheide	George Altheide	1970 Dodge	177	$1,750	0	+23 Laps
16	4	12	Bobby Allison	Richard Howard	1972 Chevrolet	177	$4,900	2	+23 Laps
17	20	76	Ben Arnold	Ben Arnold	1971 Ford	176	$1,760	0	+24 Laps
18	7	79	Frank Warren	Frank Warren	1970 Dodge	170	$2,300	0	Engine
19	25	57	David Ray Boggs	David Ray Boggs	1970 Dodge	165	$1,630	0	+35 Laps
20	27	86	Ed Hessert	Neil Castles	1970 Dodge	107	$1,170	0	Distributor
21	30	44	Larry Dickson	Richard Giachetti	1971 Ford	103	$1,535	0	Engine
22	9	56	Jim Hurtubise	Richard Hammond	1970 Chevrolet	100	$1,700	0	Engine
23	14	90	Bill Dennis	Donlavey Racing	1972 Ford	85	$2,120	0	Valve
24	19	70	J. D. McDuffie	McDuffie Racing	1971 Chevrolet	84	$2,010	0	Oil pressure
25	3	14	Coo Coo Marlin	H. B. Cunningham	1972 Chevrolet	81	$1,975	0	Valve
26	32	43	Richard Petty	Petty Enterprises	1972 Plymouth	80	$5,060	31	Valve
27	12	2	Dave Marcis	Marcis Auto Racing	1972 Dodge	57	$2,025	0	Engine
28	28	88	Ron Keselowski	Roger Lubinski	1970 Dodge	44	$1,370	0	Piston
29	36	45	Bill Seifert	Bill Seifert	1971 Ford	44	$1,830	0	Steering
30	18	97	Red Farmer	Willie Humphries	1972 Ford	32	$1,375	0	Engine
31	17	61	Jimmy Finger	Don Bierschwale	1971 Ford	26	$1,350	0	Head gasket
32	22	67	Buddy Arrington	Buddy Arrington	1970 Plymouth	21	$1,300	0	Crash
33	1	71	Bobby Isaac	Nord Krauskopf	1972 Dodge	19	$10,230	0	Engine
34	31	11	Buddy Baker	Petty Enterprises	1972 Dodge	18	$2,300	0	Crash
35	10	16	Mark Donohue	Penske Racing	1972 Matador	18	$1,375	0	Push rod
36	29	30	Walter Ballard	Vic Ballard	1971 Ford	16	$1,660	0	Crash
37	24	9	Ramo Stott	Jack Housby	1972 Dodge	13	$1,165	0	Oil pressure
38	39	10	Bill Champion	Bill Champion	1971 Ford	13	$1,585	0	Crank
39	11	24	Cecil Gordon	Cecil Gordon	1971 Mercury	11	$1,725	0	Valve
40	40	47	Raymond Williams	Raymond Williams	1971 Ford	4	$800	0	Steering

Preceded by 1971 Daytona 500	Daytona 500 races 1959-present	Succeeded by 1973 Daytona 500
