= 1971 NASCAR Winston Cup Series =

American motorsport season

Seasons
- ← 1970 1972 →

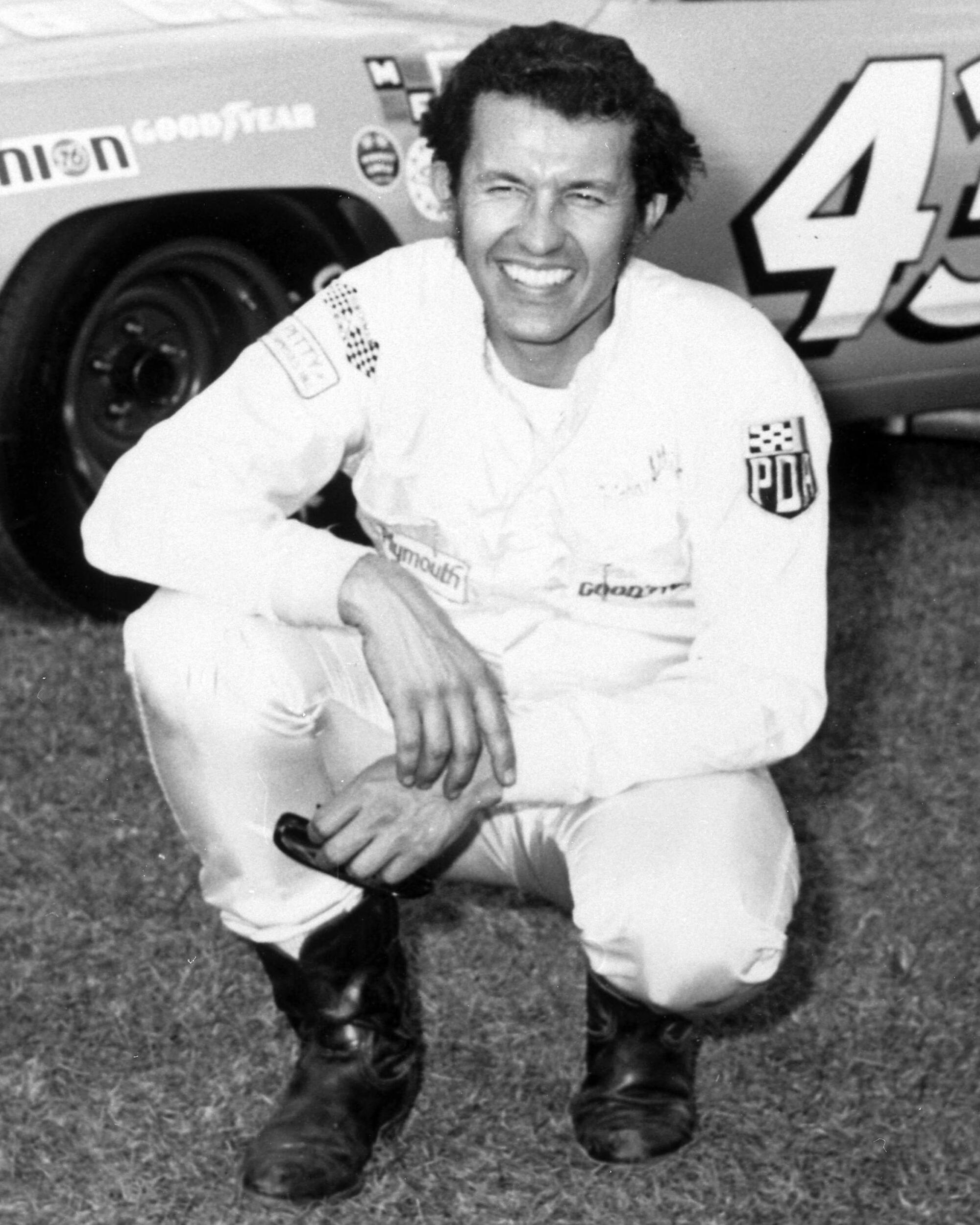
Richard Petty, the 1971 NASCAR Winston Cup Series Champion. This would be his 3rd of his 7 championships.

The 1971 NASCAR Winston Cup Series season began on January 10 and ended on November 20. Richard Petty was the champion for this Winston Cup season. After 20 years of being named the NASCAR Grand National Series, R. J. Reynolds first became the primary sponsor in a decade where the growing anti-tobacco movement banned its advertisement on television and motorsports was the ideal place to place their advertisements. Through NASCAR, Winston merchandise was unveiled to live viewers of the races (since they were not allowed to advertise to a televised audience). This kind of merchandise would also be given out at stores that sold cigarettes in subsequent years. Race car drivers were encouraged to smoke cigarettes (when not racing) until the mid-2000s brought in strict drug testing policies in addition to a smoking cessation program by Nicorette, a GlaxoSmithKline brand (Goody's Headache Powders, a long-time NASCAR sponsor, is a GSK brand; as of 2023, GSK sponsors both the Truck series race, and the spring Cup race at Martinsville Speedway).

== Season recap ==
No.	Date	Event	Circuit	Winner
1	January 10	Motor Trend 500	Riverside International Raceway	Ray Elder
2	February 11	125 Mile Qualifying Races	Daytona International Speedway	Pete Hamilton
3	February 11	125 Mile Qualifying Races	Daytona International Speedway	David Pearson
4	February 14	Daytona 500	Daytona International Speedway	Richard Petty
5	February 28	Miller High Life 500	Ontario Motor Speedway	A. J. Foyt
6	March 7	Richmond 500	Richmond Fairgrounds Raceway	Richard Petty
7	March 14	Carolina 500	North Carolina Speedway	Richard Petty
8	March 21	Hickory 276	Hickory Motor Speedway	Richard Petty
9	March 28	Southeastern 500	Bristol International Speedway	David Pearson
10	April 4	Atlanta 500	Atlanta International Raceway	A. J. Foyt
11	April 8	Columbia 200	Columbia Speedway	Richard Petty
12	April 10	Greenville 200	Greenville-Pickens Speedway	Bobby Isaac
13	April 15	Maryville 200	Smoky Mountain Raceway	Richard Petty
14	April 18	Gwyn Staley 400	North Wilkesboro Speedway	Richard Petty
15	April 25	Virginia 500	Martinsville Speedway	Richard Petty
16	May 2	Rebel 400	Darlington Raceway	Buddy Baker
17	May 9	Halifax County 100	South Boston Speedway	Benny Parsons
18	May 16	Winston 500	Alabama International Motor Speedway	Donnie Allison
19	May 21	Asheville 300	New Asheville Speedway	Richard Petty
20	May 23	Kingsport 300	Kingsport Speedway	Bobby Isaac
21	May 30	World 600	Charlotte Motor Speedway	Bobby Allison
22	June 6	Mason-Dixon 500	Dover Downs International Speedway	Bobby Allison
23	June 13	Motor State 400	Michigan International Speedway	Bobby Allison
24	June 20	Golden State 400	Riverside International Raceway	Bobby Allison
25	June 23	Space City 300	Meyer Speedway	Bobby Allison
26	June 26	Pickens 200	Greenville-Pickens Speedway	Richard Petty
27	July 4	Firecracker 400	Daytona International Speedway	Bobby Isaac
28	July 11	Volunteer 500	Bristol Speedway	Charlie Glotzbach
29	July 14	Albany-Saratoga 250	Albany-Saratoga Speedway	Richard Petty
30	July 15	Islip 250	Islip Speedway	Richard Petty
31	July 18	Northern 300	Trenton Speedway	Richard Petty
32	July 24	Nashville 420	Nashville Speedway	Richard Petty
33	August 1	Dixie 500	Atlanta International Raceway	Richard Petty
34	August 6	Myers Brothers 250	Bowman Gray Stadium	Richard Petty (Note: Bobby Allison won in a Grand American car.) (combined race)
35	August 8	West Virginia 500	International Raceway Park	Richard Petty
36	August 15	Yankee 400	Michigan International Speedway	Bobby Allison
37	August 22	Talladega 500	Alabama International Motor Speedway	Bobby Allison
38	August 27	Sandlapper 200	Columbia Speedway	Richard Petty
39	August 28	Buddy Shuman 276	Hickory Motor Speedway	Elmo Langley (Note: Tiny Lund won in a Grand American car.) (combined race)
40	September 6	Southern 500	Darlington Raceway	Bobby Allison
41	September 26	Old Dominion 500	Martinsville Speedway	Bobby Isaac
42	October 10	National 500	Charlotte Motor Speedway	Bobby Allison
43	October 17	Delaware 500	Dover Downs International Speedway	Richard Petty
44	October 24	American 500	North Carolina Speedway	Richard Petty
45	November 7	Georgia 500	Middle Georgia Raceway	Bobby Allison
46	November 14	Capital City 500	Richmond Fairgrounds Raceway	Richard Petty
47	November 21	Wilkes 400	North Wilkesboro Speedway	Charlie Glotzbach (Note: Tiny Lund won in a Grand American car.) (combined race)
48	December 12	Texas 500	Texas World Speedway	Richard Petty

Note: Some races were combined races for Grand American and Grand National cars. Races marked Combined Races were won by Grand American cars. The driver who finished first among Grand National cars is listed.

== Notable Races ==
=== Motor Trend 500 ===
The 1971 Motor Trend 500 was the first official race in NASCAR's Winston Cup era. Drivers had to contend with 191 laps on a 2.620 mile road course at Riverside International Raceway in Riverside, California. Ray Elder won the race.

1. 96- Ray Elder
2. 12- Bobby Allison
3. 72- Benny Parsons (2 laps behind)
4. 71- Bobby Isaac (2 laps behind)
5. 48- James Hylton (6 laps behind)
6. 39- Friday Hassler (7 laps behind)
7. 32- Kevin Terris (7 laps behind)
8. 26- Carl Joiner (22 laps behind)
9. 19- Henley Gray (22 laps behind)
10. 24- Cecil Gordon (24 laps behind)

=== Daytona 500 ===
The 12th annual Daytona 500 was run on February 14 at Daytona International Speedway in Daytona Beach, Florida. A. J. Foyt won the pole and Richard Petty would win his third Daytona 500.

Top Ten Results

1. 43- Richard Petty
2. 11- Buddy Baker
3. 21- A. J. Foyt
4. 17- David Pearson (1 lap behind)
5. 99- Fred Lorenzen (1 lap behind)
6. 31- Jim Vandiver (2 laps behind)
7. 22- Dick Brooks (2 laps behind)
8. 20- Jim Hurtubise (3 laps behind)
9. 48- James Hylton (3 laps behind)
10. 71- Bobby Isaac (3 laps behind)

=== Miller High Life 500 ===
The Miller High Life 500 was run on February 28 at Ontario Motor Speedway. A. J. Foyt would win this race after more than three hours of racing (from the pole position).

1. 21- A. J. Foyt
2. 11- Buddy Baker
3. 43- Richard Petty
4. 71- Bobby Isaac
5. 22- Dick Brooks
6. 98- LeeRoy Yarbrough
7. 96- Ray Elder
8. 55- Tiny Lund
9. 72- Benny Parsons
10. 48- James Hylton

=== Greenville 200 ===
The Greenville 200 was the first live flag-to-flag telecast of a NASCAR race. The race was run on Saturday, April 10 at Greenville-Pickens Speedway and was carried live on ABC with Jim McKay, Chris Economaki and Ken Squier. Bobby Isaac won the race.

1. 71- Bobby Isaac, 1970 Dodge Charger
2. 17- David Pearson (2 laps behind), 1970 Ford Purolator
3. 22- Dick Brooks (2 laps behind), 1969 Dodge Charger
4. 2- Dave Marcis (2 laps behind), 1969 Dodge Charger
5. 72- Benny Parsons (2 laps behind), 1969 Ford
6. 48- James Hylton (4 laps behind), 1971 Ford
7. 43- Richard Petty (4 laps behind), 1970 Plymouth Road Runner
8. 39- Friday Hassler (5 laps behind), 1969 Chevrolet
9. 06- Neil Castles (5 laps behind), 1969 Dodge Charger
10. 20- Elmo Langley (7 laps behind), 1970 Mercury

=== Rebel 400 ===
The Rebel 400 was run on May 2 at Darlington Raceway in Darlington, South Carolina. Donnie Allison won the pole and Buddy Baker would win his third Rebel 400.

1. 11- Buddy Baker
2. 22- Dick Brooks
3. 2- Dave Marcis
4. 21- Donnie Allison
5. 31- Jim Vandiver
6. 49- G. C. Spencer
7. 70- J. D. McDuffie
8. 39- Friday Hassler
9. 76- Ben Arnold
10. 64- Elmo Langley

=== Winston 500 ===
The Winston 500 was run on May 16 at Alabama International Motor Speedway in Talladega, Alabama. Donnie Allison won the pole and won the race. He defeated Bobby by some seconds.

1. 21- Donnie Allison
2. 12- Bobby Allison
3. 11- Buddy Baker
4. 6- Pete Hamilton (1 lap behind)
5. 99- Fred Lorenzen (1 lap behind)
6. 31- Jim Vandiver (2 laps behind)
7. 48- James Hylton (3 laps behind)
8. 90- Bill Dennis (5 laps behind)
9. 71- Dave Marcis (7 laps behind)
10. 68- Larry Baumel (10 laps behind)

=== World 600 ===
The World 600 was run on May 30 at Charlotte Motor Speedway in Concord, South Carolina. Charlie Glotzbach won the pole and Bobby Allison would win the 1971 World 600 (defeating his brother).

1. 12- Bobby Allison
2. 21- Donnie Allison
3. 6- Pete Hamilton (1 lap behind)
4. 43- Richard Petty (2 laps behind)
5. 99- Fred Lorenzen (5 laps behind)
6. 11- Buddy Baker (6 laps behind)
7. 72- Benny Parsons (8 laps behind)
8. 39- Friday Hassler (9 laps behind)
9. 2- Dave Marcis (10 laps behind)
10. 22- Dick Brooks (10 laps behind)

=== Myers Brothers 250 ===
The 1971 Myers Brothers 250 was a NASCAR Winston Cup Series event that took place on August 6, 1971, at Bowman Gray Stadium in the American community of Winston-Salem, North Carolina. Due to the reduced sponsorship money being given out by the "Big Three" automobile companies in Detroit, NASCAR decided to hold six of their smaller Winston Cup Series races in conjunction with the support NASCAR Grand American Series.

Three of these races were won by drivers who raced in Grand American cars. Tiny Lund (Hickory and North Wilkesboro) and Bobby Allison (Winston-Salem). Lund was credited with the win in his races, but Allison was not credited with a win until the publicity event for the 2025 Cook Out Clash at Bowman Gray Stadium in October 2024, shortly before his death that November at 86. Allison was declared the race winner and given the Grand National race win for that race, even though technically, the correct Grand National class winner was never credited with the win.

Under current regulations for NASCAR Holdings, Inc. owned series (NASCAR and IMSA) that feature multiple classes of cars in combination races such as the IMSA WeatherTech SportsCar Championship with GTP, LMP 2, GTD Pro, and GTD classes, the IMSA Michelin Pilot Challenge with GT4 and TCR classes, and the ARCA Menards Series combination races with the national series and either East or West cars, there is a winner for each class of car. Richard Petty finished second overall, winning the Grand National class, but NASCAR has never credited Petty with the class win as would be the case in multiple class events.

1. 49-Bobby Allison
2. 43-Richard Petty
3. 14-Jim Paschal
4. 87-Buck Baker
5. 11-Dave Marcis
6. 55-Tiny Lund
7. 15-Wayne Andrews
8. 25-Jabe Thomas
9. 86-David Ray Boggs
10. 30-Walter Ballard

=== Yankee 400 ===
The Yankee 400 was run on August 15 at Michigan International Speedway in Brooklyn, Michigan. Pete Hamilton won the pole and Bobby Allison would win the 1971 Yankee 400.

1. 12- Bobby Allison
2. 43- Richard Petty
3. 11- Buddy Baker
4. 60- Maynard Troyer
5. 18- Joe Frasson
6. 24- Cecil Gordon
7. 88- Ron Keselowski
8. 48- James Hylton
9. 25- Jabe Thomas
10. 06- Neil Castles

=== Delaware 500 ===
The 1971 Delaware 500 is a NASCAR Winston Cup Series race that took place on October 17, 1971. Richard Petty defeated Charlie Glotzbach by more than one lap in front of eighteen thousand people.

1. 43- Richard Petty
2. 98- Charlie Glotzbach
3. 71- Bobby Isaac
4. 12- Bobby Allison
5. 90- Bill Dennis
6. 57- David Ray Boggs
7. 91- Richard D. Brown
8. 64- Elmo Langley
9. 30- Walter Ballard
10. 48- James Hylton

== Final Point Standings ==
Pos.	Driver	Races	Wins	Top 5s	Top 10s	Points
1	Richard Petty	46	21	38	41	4435
2	James Hylton	46	0	14	37	4071
3	Cecil Gordon	46	0	6	21	3677
4	Bobby Allison	42	11	27	31	3636
5	Elmo Langley	46	0	11	23	3356
6	Jabe Thomas	43	0	2	15	3200
7	Bill Champion	45	0	3	14	3058
8	Frank Warren	47	0	1	10	2886
9	J. D. McDuffie	43	0	2	8	2862
10	Walter Ballard	41	0	3	11	2633
11	Benny Parsons	35	1	13	18	2611
12	Ed Negre	43	0	0	2	2528
13	Bill Seifert	37	0	0	4	2403
14	Henley Gray	39	0	0	4	2392
15	Buddy Baker	19	1	13	16	2358
16	Friday Hassler	29	0	4	13	2277
17	Earl Brooks	35	0	1	4	2205
18	Bill Dennis	28	0	4	10	2181
19	Wendell Scott	37	0	0	4	2180
20	John Sears	37	0	0	3	2167
21	Dave Marcis	29	0	9	14	2049
22	Neil Castles	38	0	1	10	2036
23	Bobby Isaac	25	4	16	17	1819
24	Pete Hamilton	22	1	11	12	1739
25	Joe Frasson	17	0	1	4	1619
26	Ben Arnold	18	0	0	3	1618
27	Ron Keselowski	20	0	0	6	1446
28	Bill Shirey	27	0	0	2	1303
29	Donnie Allison	13	1	7	9	1280
30	Dean Dalton	20	0	0	1	1276

== Other information ==
- This was the first season where NASCAR's premier racing series was called the Winston Cup. All previous seasons were known as either Grand National or Strictly Stock.

== See also ==
- 1971 NASCAR Winston West Series
