= WAYN (AM) =

- Rockingham, North Carolina; United States
- Frequency: 900 kHz
- Branding: Pioneer Voice of the Carolina Sandhills

Programming
- Format: Adult contemporary

Ownership
- Owner: WAYN Incorporated

History
- First air date: September 1946

Technical information
- Licensing authority: FCC
- Facility ID: 71152
- Class: B
- Power: 1,000 watts (day); 297 watts (night)
- Transmitter coordinates: 34°55′30″N 79°44′35″W

Links
- Public license information: Public file; LMS

WAYN (900 AM) is a radio station based in Rockingham, North Carolina. The station plays a variety of adult contemporary and easy listening music.

With a daytime transmission power of 1,000 watts, and a night time transmission power of 297 watts. WAYN broadcasts from 6 a.m. to 10 p.m.

== History ==
WAYN was founded in 1946 by Wayne M. Nelson of Mooresville, North Carolina. It is one of North Carolina's earliest radio stations and was the first FCC licensed radio station between Charlotte and Fayetteville.

The first voice heard on the station was that of Robert D. Raiford, who later became a commentator for John Boy and Billy.

In 2006, morning host Jimmy Smith celebrated 55 years on the station. He was 16 when he started, and still on the air at 76 to celebrate 60 years. Mayor Eugene McLaurin declared Jimmy Smith day in 2001 for his 50th anniversary. Smith retired in 2013 after 62 years.
