= 1972 NASCAR Winston Cup Series =

American motorsport season

Seasons
- ← 1971 1973 →

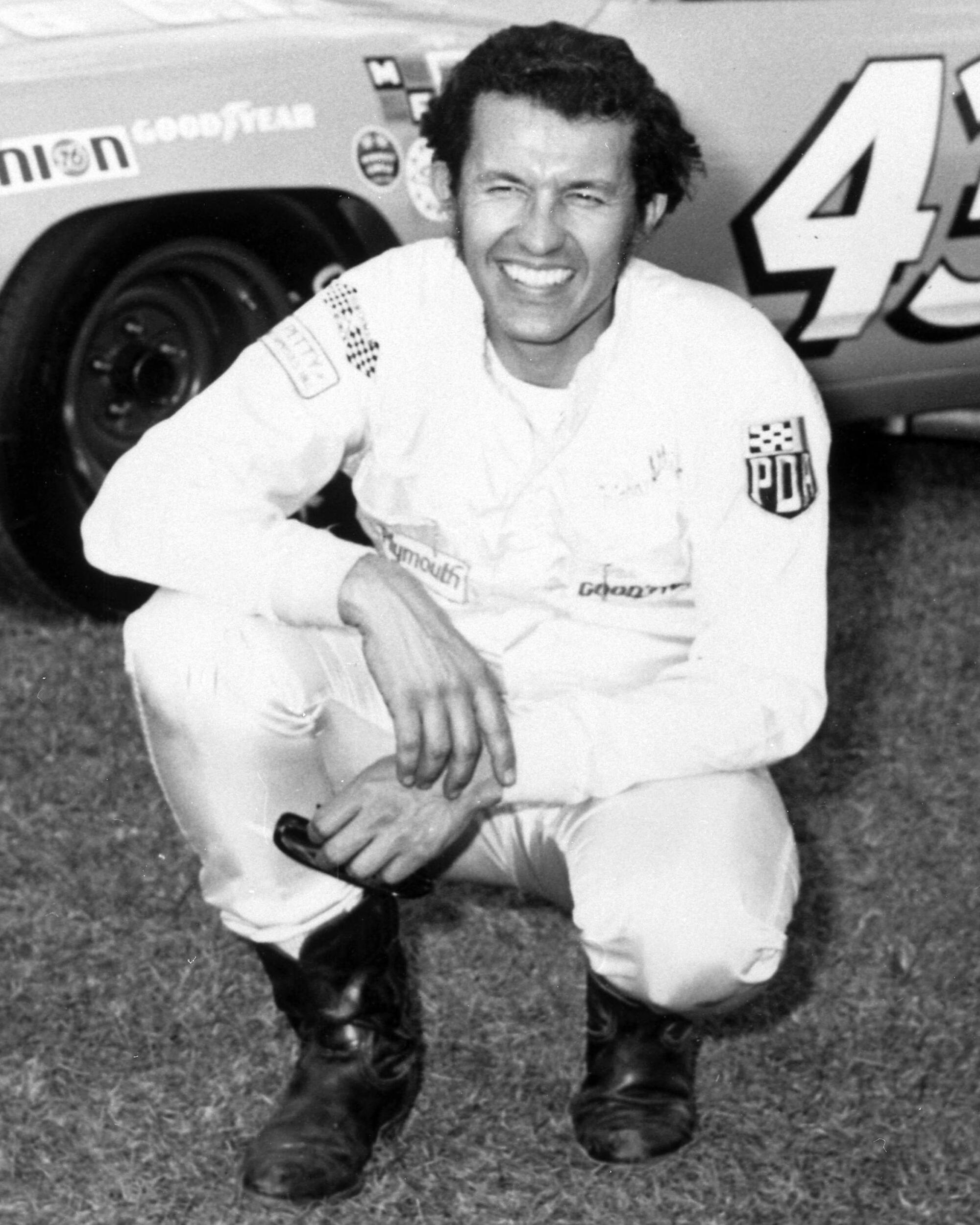
Richard Petty, the 1972 NASCAR Winston Cup Series Champion. This would be his 4th of his 7 championships.

The 1972 NASCAR Winston Cup Series was the 24th season of professional stock car racing in the United States and the 1st modern-era NASCAR Cup series season. The season began on Sunday January 23 and ended on Sunday November 12. Richard Petty won his second consecutive Winston Cup Championship and fourth overall. Larry Smith was named NASCAR Rookie of the Year.

This season is considered to be the first of NASCAR's "modern era". The number of races was reduced from 48 to 31, all dirt tracks were removed from the schedule, and a minimum race distance of 250 miles (402 km) was established for oval tracks. (The shortest scheduled race in the modern era was the 2021–2023 Food City 250 at Bristol Motor Speedway of 133.25 miles, on dirt; the shortest Cup Series race since the rule change was the 1992 Watkins Glen race, which was 125.127 miles (51 laps) because of rain in an era before NASCAR began racing in rain.)

Exactly ten minutes from the Old Dominion 500 along with a flyover by the local military jets were used in the 1973 American film The Last American Hero. While Richard Petty and Bobby Allison got filmed most of the time, a moment involving Ray Hendrick's #2 vehicle crashing on lap 311 was also a notable event during the filming.

== Schedule ==
No.	Race title	Track	Date
1	Winston Western 500	Riverside International Raceway, Riverside, California	January 23
	125 Mile Qualifying Races	Daytona International Speedway, Daytona Beach, Florida	February 17
2	Daytona 500	Daytona International Speedway, Daytona Beach, Florida	February 20
3	Richmond 500	Richmond Fairgrounds Raceway, Richmond, Virginia	February 27
4	Miller High Life 500	Ontario Motor Speedway, Ontario, California	March 5
5	Carolina 500	North Carolina Speedway, Rockingham, North Carolina	March 12
6	Atlanta 500	Atlanta International Raceway, Hampton, Georgia	March 26
7	Southeastern 500	Bristol International Speedway, Bristol, Tennessee	April 9
8	Rebel 400	Darlington Raceway, Darlington, South Carolina	April 16
9	Gwyn Staley 400	North Wilkesboro Speedway, North Wilkesboro, North Carolina	April 23
10	Virginia 500	Martinsville Speedway, Ridgeway, Virginia	April 30
11	Winston 500	Alabama International Motor Speedway, Lincoln, Alabama	May 7
12	World 600	Charlotte Motor Speedway, Concord, North Carolina	May 28
13	Mason-Dixon 500	Dover Downs International Speedway, Dover, Delaware	June 4
14	Motor State 400	Michigan International Speedway, Brooklyn, Michigan	June 11
15	Golden State 400	Riverside International Raceway, Riverside, California	June 18
16	Lone Star 500	Texas World Speedway, College Station, Texas	June 25
17	Firecracker 400	Daytona International Speedway, Daytona Beach, Florida	July 4
18	Volunteer 500	Bristol International Speedway, Bristol, Tennessee	July 9
19	Northern 300	Trenton Speedway, Trenton, New Jersey	July 16
20	Dixie 500	Atlanta International Raceway, Hampton, Georgia	July 23
21	Talladega 500	Alabama International Motor Speedway, Lincoln, Alabama	August 6
22	Yankee 400	Michigan International Speedway, Brooklyn, Michigan	August 20
23	Nashville 420	Nashville Speedway, Nashville, Tennessee	August 27
24	Southern 500	Darlington Raceway, Darlington, South Carolina	September 4
25	Capital City 500	Richmond Fairgrounds Raceway, Richmond, Virginia	September 10
26	Delaware 500	Dover Downs International Speedway, Dover, Delaware	September 17
27	Old Dominion 500	Martinsville Speedway, Ridgeway, Virginia	September 24
28	Wilkes 400	North Wilkesboro Speedway, North Wilkesboro, North Carolina	October 1
29	National 500	Charlotte Motor Speedway, Concord, North Carolina	October 8
30	American 500	North Carolina Speedway, Rockingham, North Carolina	October 22
31	Texas 500	Texas World Speedway, College Station, Texas	November 12

== Season recap ==
Date	Event	Circuit	Winner
January 23	Winston Western 500	Riverside International Raceway	Richard Petty
February 20	Daytona 500	Daytona International Speedway	A. J. Foyt
February 27	Richmond 500	Richmond Fairgrounds Raceway	Richard Petty
March 5	Miller High Life 500	Ontario Motor Speedway	A. J. Foyt
March 12	Carolina 500	North Carolina Speedway	Bobby Isaac
March 26	Atlanta 500	Atlanta International Raceway	Bobby Allison
April 9	Southeastern 500	Bristol International Speedway	Bobby Allison
April 16	Rebel 500	Darlington Raceway	David Pearson
April 23	Gwyn Staley 400	North Wilkesboro Speedway	Richard Petty
April 30	Virginia 500	Martinsville Speedway	Richard Petty
May 7	Winston 500	Alabama International Motor Speedway	David Pearson
May 28	World 600	Charlotte Motor Speedway	Buddy Baker
June 4	Mason-Dixon 500	Dover Downs International Speedway	Bobby Allison
June 11	Motor State 400	Michigan International Speedway	David Pearson
June 18	Golden State 400	Riverside International Raceway	Ray Elder
June 25	Lone Star 500	Texas World Speedway	Richard Petty
July 4	Firecracker 400	Daytona International Speedway	David Pearson
July 9	Volunteer 500	Bristol International Speedway	Bobby Allison
July 16	Northern 300	Trenton Speedway	Bobby Allison
July 23	Dixie 500	Atlanta International Raceway	Bobby Allison
August 6	Talladega 500	Alabama International Motor Speedway	James Hylton
August 20	Yankee 400	Michigan International Speedway	David Pearson
August 27	Nashville 420	Nashville Speedway	Bobby Allison
September 4	Southern 500	Darlington Raceway	Bobby Allison
September 10	Capital City 500	Richmond Fairgrounds Raceway	Richard Petty
September 17	Delaware 500	Dover Downs International Speedway	David Pearson
September 24	Old Dominion 500	Martinsville Speedway	Richard Petty
October 1	Wilkes 400	North Wilkesboro Speedway	Richard Petty
October 8	National 500	Charlotte Motor Speedway	Bobby Allison
October 22	American 500	North Carolina Speedway	Bobby Allison
November 12	Texas 500	Texas World Speedway	Buddy Baker

Notes:

- Winston Western 500: Petty makes his debut under STP sponsorship.
- Texas World Speedway held two NASCAR races for the only time.

== Race summaries ==
=== Winston Western 500 ===
The Winston Western 500 was held on January 23 at Riverside International Raceway. A.J. Foyt won the pole. Richard Petty and Bobby Allison made important debuts in their careers - Petty debuted under the sponsorship of STP while Allison was making his maiden voyage with the Richard Howard Chevrolet under Junior Johnson's control. Foyt fell out with transmission failure. Allison started 16th but stormed through the field and led 102 laps before falling to second at the end. Fog shortened the race to 149 laps as Petty led 37 of the final 39 laps, driving for the final time in an all-blue racecar.

Top ten results:

1. #43 - Richard Petty
2. #12 - Bobby Allison
3. #71 - Bobby Isaac
4. #96 - Ray Elder
5. #04 - Hershel McGriff
6. #32 - Kevin Tarris
7. #48 - James Hylton
8. #64 - Elmo Langley
9. #39 - Friday Hassler
10. #24 - Cecil Gordon

=== Daytona 500 ===
The 14th Daytona 500 was held on February 20 at Daytona International Speedway. Bobby Isaac Won the pole. A.J. Foyt was unchallenged after Richard Petty fell out with engine failure 80 laps into the 500 and cruised to his only Daytona 500 win and first win at the track since 1965. Petty led 31 laps, Foyt 167, and Bobby Allison led two, indicative of the slump in competitive depth of the series with the withdrawal of the factories from participation. Isaac's engine soured on the start and he finished 33rd, while Buddy Baker crashed with Walter Ballard, who flipped in the trioval grass.

Top ten results:

1. #21 - A.J. Foyt
2. #6 - Charlie Glotzbach
3. #31 - Jim Vandiver
4. #72 - Benny Parsons
5. #48 - James Hylton
6. #3 - Cale Yarborough
7. #05 - David Sisco
8. #25 - Jabe Thomas
9. #4 - John Sears
10. #23 - Vic Elford

=== Richmond 500 ===
The Richmond 500 was held on February 27 at Richmond Fairgrounds Raceway. Bobby Allison won the pole. Richard Petty, Allison, and Bobby Isaac led all 500 laps and finished 1-2-3; Isaac finished seven laps down while Dave Marcis and Bill Dennis finished in the top five, both at least twelve laps down.

Top ten results:

1. #43 - Richard Petty
2. #12 - Bobby Allison
3. #71 - Bobby Isaac
4. #2 - Dave Marcis
5. #90 - Bill Dennis
6. #48 - James Hylton
7. #64 - Elmo Langley
8. #72 - Benny Parsons
9. #24 - Cecil Gordon
10. #4 - John Sears

=== Miller 500 ===
The Miller High Life 500 was held on March 5 at Ontario Motor Speedway. A.J. Foyt won the pole. The battle was between Foyt, Richard Petty, Buddy Baker, Bobby Allison, and Bobby Isaac, while West Coast ace Ray Elder and Benny Parsons also led. 51 cars started with over 30 additional entries sent home after qualifying. Isaac crashed with Mark Donohue 45 laps in ("it's a new car and it's totaled out," said the dejected Isaac) while Petty lost a lap on a botched pitstop; he push-drafted Baker and Allison to keep them challenging Foyt ("Foyt was ridiculously faster than my Chevy down the straights," Allison said), but Foyt took what would be his final NASCAR win.

Top ten results:

1. #21 - A.J. Foyt
2. #12 - Bobby Allison
3. #11 - Buddy Baker
4. #96 - Ray Elder
5. #04 - Hershel McGriff
6. #48 - James Hylton
7. #42 - Marty Robbins
8. #64 - Elmo Langley
9. #9 - Ramo Stott

=== Carolina 500 ===
The Carolina 500 was held on March 12 at North Carolina Motor Speedway. Bobby Allison won the pole, but had to start 39th after changing tires following qualifying. He stormed through the field to lead 260 laps, but at Lap 345 his engine failed. Isaac led 210 laps for the win, only his third big-track Grand National win and what would be his final career Grand National win. The race occurred two days following the birth of future cup champion Matt Kenseth.

Top ten results:

1. #71 - Bobby Isaac
2. #43 - Richard Petty
3. #31 - Jim Vandiver
4. #45 - LeeRoy Yarbrough
5. #2 - Dave Marcis
6. #48 - James Hylton
7. #72 - Benny Parsons
8. #67 - Buddy Arrington
9. #64 - Elmo Langley
10. #06 - Neil Castles

=== Atlanta 500 ===
The Atlanta 500 was held on March 26 at Atlanta International Raceway. Bobby Allison won the pole. Working to solve the engine issues plaguing the team, Junior Johnson began using Union aviation oil for Allison's engines. Allison engaged in a race-long duel with Bobby Isaac, escaping a hard crash with Ron Keselowski at one point. Late in the race A. J. Foyt stormed to the front but Allison grabbed the lead with four laps to go and edged Foyt and Isaac for the first superspeedway win for Chevrolet in some eight years.

Top ten results:

1. #12 - Bobby Allison
2. #21 - A.J. Foyt
3. #71 - Bobby Isaac
4. #15 - David Pearson
5. #27 - Donnie Allison
6. #43 - Richard Petty
7. #72 - Benny Parsons
8. #11 - Buddy Baker
9. #45 - LeeRoy Yarbrough
10. #48 - James Hylton

=== Southeastern 400 ===
The Southeastern 400 was held on April 9 at Bristol International Speedway. Bobby Allison won the pole.

Top ten results:

1. #12 - Bobby Allison
2. #71 - Bobby Isaac
3. #43 - Richard Petty
4. #45 - LeeRoy Yarbrough
5. #24 - Cecil Gordon
6. #14 - Coo Coo Marlin
7. #64 - Elmo Langley
8. #48 - James Hylton
9. #49 - G.C. Spencer
10. #25 - Jabe Thomas

=== Rebel 400 ===
The Rebel 400 was held on April 16 at Darlington Raceway. With A. J. Foyt having to serve his Indycar commitments, Wood Brothers Racing hired David Pearson to drive their #21. Pearson responded by winning the pole, and leading 202 laps to score his first victory since March 1971. Richard Petty finished a lap down in second; the 1-2 finish began one of the most celebrated periods in NASCAR history. Bobby Allison led 29 laps but finished a very distant (15 laps down) seventh. Joe Frasson finished third.

Top ten results:

1. #21 - David Pearson
2. #43 - Richard Petty
3. #18 - Joe Frasson
4. #72 - Benny Parsons
5. #48 - James Hylton
6. #67 - Buddy Arrington
7. #12 - Bobby Allison
8. #4 - John Sears
9. #25 - Jabe Thomas
10. #24 - Cecil Gordon

=== Gwyn Staley 400 ===
The Gwyn Staley 400 was held on April 23 at North Wilkesboro Speedway. Bobby Isaac won the pole. Richard Petty, Bobby Allison, and Isaac dominated the race and finished 1-2-3. Petty led the last 25 laps after a late tire change where his team put on "gumballs" (softer compound tires). The racing between the three became heated during the day, Petty calling it "a wing-doolie" of a race.

Top ten results:

1. #43 - Richard Petty
2. #12 - Bobby Allison
3. #71 - Bobby Isaac
4. #48 - James Hylton
5. #72 - Benny Parsons
6. #45 - LeeRoy Yarbrough
7. #2 - Dave Marcis
8. #92 - Larry Smith
9. #30 - Walter Ballard
10. #4 - John Sears

=== Virginia 500 ===
The Virginia 500 was held on April 30 at Martinsville Speedway. Bobby Allison won the pole. Wood Brothers Racing usually entered only at Martinsville for a short track effort and David Pearson led 102 laps but his transmission broke while leading and he was done with thirty laps to go; he still finished eighth. Allison led 27 laps to finish second; Bobby Isaac led 268 laps but blew his engine while leading and finished 19th. As a result Richard Petty, despite being on seven cylinders, had his fourth win of the season.

Top ten results:

1. #43 - Richard Petty
2. #12 - Bobby Allison
3. #2 - Dave Marcis
4. #24 - Cecil Gordon
5. #91 - Richard D. Brown
6. #10 - Bill Champion
7. #48 - James Hylton
8. #21 - David Pearson
9. #30 - Walter Ballard
10. #47 - Raymond Williams

=== Winston 500 ===
The Winston 500 was held on May 7 at Alabama International Motor Speedway. Bobby Isaac won the pole. The lead changed 53 times as Isaac, David Pearson, Buddy Baker, and Richard Petty battled with Fred Lorenzen, driving a Hoss Ellington #28. Bobby Allison led early but fell out with engine failure. Petty cut a tire late and lost a lap, and coming to the white flag Isaac was sideslammed by lapped traffic, giving Pearson the lead for the win, his second in the Wood Brothers Mercury. Darrell Waltrip made his Winston Cup debut in this race, starting 25th and finishing 38th after a blown engine.

Top ten results:

1. #21 - David Pearson
2. #71 - Bobby Isaac
3. #11 - Buddy Baker
4. #28 - Fred Lorenzen
5. #43 - Richard Petty
6. #18 - Joe Frasson
7. #45 - LeeRoy Yarbrough
8. #98 - Dick Brooks
9. #79 - Frank Warren
10. #72 - Benny Parsons

=== World 600 ===
The World 600 was held on May 28 at Charlotte Motor Speedway. Bobby Allison won the pole (the second straight 600 pole for the racecar owned by track promoter Richard Howard) and led 239 laps, but blew both right side tires with 30 laps to go and Buddy Baker took the win. Richard Petty and Bobby Isaac fell out with engine failures as did Wendell Scott, driving a second Chevrolet out of Junior Johnson's shop.

Top ten results:

1. #11 - Buddy Baker
2. #12 - Bobby Allison
3. #6 - Charlie Glotzbach
4. #72 - Benny Parsons
5. #45 - LeeRoy Yarbrough
6. #92 - Larry Smith
7. #67 - Buddy Arrington
8. #24 - Cecil Gordon
9. #79 - Frank Warren
10. #76 - Ben Arnold

=== Mason-Dixon 500 ===
The Mason-Dixon 500 was held on June 4 at Dover Downs International Speedway. Bobby Isaac won the pole. Allison and Petty finished 1-2 after leading 492 of 500 laps; Benny Parsons and Dean Dalton were the only other leaders.

Top ten results:

1. #12 - Bobby Allison
2. #43 - Richard Petty
3. #45 - LeeRoy Yarbrough
4. #90 - Jackie Oliver
5. #4 - John Sears
6. #72 - Benny Parsons
7. #48 - James Hylton
8. #24 - Cecil Gordon
9. #88 - Ron Keselowski
10. #83 - Paul Tyler

=== Motor State 400 ===
The Motor State 400 was held on June 11 at Michigan International Speedway. Bobby Isaac won the pole. David Pearson led 154 laps in an easy win, finishing sixteen seconds ahead of Bobby Allison and half a lap ahead of Richard Petty. Pete Hamilton drove a Jim Ruggles Plymouth and raced with the leaders before falling out in the final 50 laps.

Top ten results:

1. #21 - David Pearson
2. #12 - Bobby Allison
3. #43 - Richard Petty
4. #48 - James Hylton
5. #88 - Ron Keselowski
6. #92 - Larry Smith
7. #76 - Ben Arnold
8. #7 - Dean Dalton
9. #67 - Buddy Arrington
10. #10 - Bill Champion

=== Golden State 400 ===
The Golden State 400 was held on June 18 at Riverside International Raceway. Richard Petty won the pole.

Top ten results:

1. #96 - Ray Elder
2. #72 - Benny Parsons
3. #16 - Donnie Allison
4. #48 - James Hylton
5. #26 - Carl Joiner
6. #12 - Bobby Allison
7. #09 - Carl Adams
8. #24 - Cecil Gordon
9. #00 - Frank James
10. #64 - Dick May

=== Lone Star 500 ===
The Lone Star 500 was held on June 25 at Texas World Speedway. Richard Petty won the pole. Petty battled Bobby Isaac in 100-degree heat before Isaac faltered and Petty beat Bobby Allison by a full lap; Petty held a slender point lead over James Hylton, who had come under fire earlier in the season for leading the points race despite finishing behind Petty and Allison almost every race. Privateer Richard Childress was involved in a bizarre crash when he spun in Leonard Faustina's oil and flipped into a ditch.

Top ten results:

1. #43 - Richard Petty
2. #12 - Bobby Allison
3. #14 - Coo Coo Marlin
4. #72 - Benny Parsons
5. #71 - Bobby Isaac
6. #48 - James Hylton
7. #92 - Larry Smith
8. #76 - Ben Arnold
9. #7 - Dean Dalton
10. #10 - Bill Champion

=== Firecracker 400 ===
The Firecracker 400 was held on July 4 at Daytona International Speedway. Bobby Isaac won the pole. The finish turned into an exciting three-car shootout between David Pearson, Richard Petty, and Bobby Allison. Petty tried to muscle past Pearson up high on the homestretch but came six feet short, with Allison hard on Pearson's trunk at the stripe. Coo Coo Marlin finished fourth after being briefly detained by Daytona police three days prior when a bar brawl accidentally swept up Marlin's wife Eula Faye.

Top ten results:

1. #21 - David Pearson
2. #43 - Richard Petty
3. #12 - Bobby Allison
4. #14 - Coo Coo Marlin
5. #48 - James Hylton
6. #45 - LeeRoy Yarbrough
7. #88 - Ron Keselowski
8. #15 - Donnie Allison
9. #33 - Wayne Smith
10. #32 - Johnny Halford

=== Volunteer 500 ===
The Volunteer 500 was held on July 9 at Bristol International Speedway. Bobby Allison won the pole.

Top ten results:

1. #12 - Bobby Allison
2. #43 - Richard Petty
3. #2 - Dave Marcis
4. #72 - Benny Parsons
5. #70 - J.D. McDuffie
6. #4 - John Sears
7. #47 - Raymond Williams
8. #24 - Cecil Gordon
9. #30 - Walter Ballard
10. #76 - Ben Arnold

=== Northern 300 ===
The Northern 300 was held on July 16 at Trenton Speedway. Bobby Isaac won the pole. Bobby Allison edged Isaac in what would be the last Winston Cup Grand National race at Trenton Speedway. Richard Petty stalled on pit road and lost a lap, while privateer Dave Marcis timed fifth and led one lap before hitting the wall.

Top ten results:

1. #12 - Bobby Allison
2. #71 - Bobby Isaac
3. #43 - Richard Petty
4. #90 - Fred Lorenzen
5. #24 - Cecil Gordon
6. #48 - James Hylton
7. #92 - Larry Smith
8. #72 - Benny Parsons
9. #47 - Raymond Williams
10. #30 - Walter Ballard

=== Dixie 500 ===
The Dixie 500 was held on July 23 at Atlanta International Raceway. David Pearson won the pole. Bobby Allison and Pearson led 285 of 328 laps but Allison took his third big-track win of the season when Pearson slowed with a souring engine, with Richard Petty a distant second.

Top ten results:

1. #12 - Bobby Allison
2. #43 - Richard Petty
3. #21 - David Pearson
4. #72 - Benny Parsons
5. #90 - LeeRoy Yarbrough
6. #28 - Fred Lorenzen
7. #2 - Dave Marcis
8. #95 - Darrell Waltrip
9. #24 - Cecil Gordon
10. #30 - Walter Ballard

=== Talladega 500 ===
The Talladega 500 was held on August 6 at Alabama International Motor Speedway. Bobby Isaac won the pole. James Hylton edged out Ramo Stott in the biggest upset of the season after 32 of 50 entries failed to finish the race. The top qualifiers crashed out on Lap 22 when Joe Frasson blew a tire while running second; he and the other top qualifiers were using a new Goodyear compound, and the angered Frasson said the new tires "weren't worth a damn." Hylton was using year-old rubber; "I was going with the old tire anyway," he said after his second career win and first on a superspeedway.

Top ten results:

1. #48 - James Hylton
2. #90 - Ramo Stott
3. #12 - Bobby Allison
4. #97 - Red Farmer
5. #67 - Buddy Arrington
6. #76 - Ben Arnold
7. #43 - Richard Petty
8. #19 - Henley Gray
9. #47 - Raymond Williams
10. #56 - Jim Hurtubise

=== Yankee 400 ===
The Yankee 400 was held on August 20 at Michigan International Speedway. Richard Petty won the pole. The speedway held its final NASCAR race under its initial ownership, and David Pearson got into a late duel with Bobby Allison in the final 27 laps, edging Allison by one car length. Pearson won despite the alternator souring; "I was scared the final 40 laps ... I expected (the engine) to quit any lap."

Top ten results:

1. #21 - David Pearson
2. #12 - Bobby Allison
3. #71 - Bobby Isaac
4. #43 - Richard Petty
5. #98 - Cale Yarborough
6. #48 - James Hylton
7. #72 - Benny Parsons
8. #45 - Bill Seifert
9. #2 - Dave Marcis
10. #92 - Larry Smith

=== Nashville 420 ===
The Nashville 420 was held on August 26 at Nashville Speedway. Bobby Allison won the pole.

Top ten results:

1. #12 - Bobby Allison
2. #43 - Richard Petty
3. #95 - Darrell Waltrip
4. #72 - Benny Parsons
5. #64 - Elmo Langley
6. #24 - Cecil Gordon
7. #19 - Henley Gray
8. #48 - James Hylton
9. #30 - Walter Ballard
10. #70 - J.D. McDuffie

=== Southern 500 ===
The Southern 500 was held on September 4 at Darlington Raceway. Bobby Allison won the pole. Allison battled David Pearson for virtually the entire 500 miles; they led 352 laps between them and at one point Pearson grabbed the lead from Allison by diving five abreast under some seven lapped cars on the frontstretch. Allison took the win with six laps to go. Richard Petty finished seven laps down due to repeated blistered tires. Buddy Baker and Bobby Isaac were eliminated in separate crashes; Baker was tabbed to drive a second Harry Hyde Dodge as Petty Enterprises could not offer him more starts in their #11 Dodge; Isaac, who'd struggled in the primary Hyde Dodge #71 all season, quit the team, saying they were not up to preparing two cars given the constant problems preparing one.

Top ten results:

1. #12 - Bobby Allison
2. #21 - David Pearson
3. #43 - Richard Petty
4. #28 - Fred Lorenzen
5. #66 - H.B. Bailey
6. #67 - Buddy Arrington
7. #16 - Dave Marcis
8. #31 - Jim Vandiver
9. #42 - Marty Robbins
10. #14 - Coo Coo Marlin

=== Capital City 500 ===
The Capital City 500 was held on September 10 at Richmond Fairgrounds Raceway. Bobby Allison won the pole. Buddy Baker was hired to replace Bobby Isaac in Harry Hyde's #71 and led one lap, but was eliminated in the crash that signaled the detonation of the Richard Petty-Bobby Allison feud that defined the season. Petty and Allison led 498 laps between them, but with nine to go Allison passed Petty; Petty stormed back ahead and sideswiped Allison entering Three; Allison hammered Petty and Petty shot hard into the guardrail coming out of Four, collecting Baker and getting off the ground atop the guardrail. Shockingly Petty slid back onto all four wheels still in the lead, holding on to win over half a lap.

Top ten results:

1. #43 - Richard Petty
2. #12 - Bobby Allison
3. #17 - Bill Dennis
4. #48 - James Hylton
5. #2 - Dave Marcis
6. #10 - Bill Champion
7. #76 - Ben Arnold
8. #7 - Dean Dalton
9. #25 - Jabe Thomas
10. #67 - Buddy Arrington

=== Delaware 500 ===
The Delaware 500 was held on September 17 at Dover Downs International Speedway. Bobby Allison won the pole. David Pearson manhandled the field, leading 350 laps for his sixth win of the season, his highest win total for a season since 1969. Bobby Allison won the pole but after leading 34 laps fell out with engine failure; with Petty finishing second the points race was getting close to being clinched.

Top ten results:

1. #21 - David Pearson
2. #43 - Richard Petty
3. #90 - Ramo Stott
4. #48 - James Hylton
5. #24 - Cecil Gordon
6. #76 - Ben Arnold
7. #64 - Elmo Langley
8. #30 - Walter Ballard
9. #7 - Dean Dalton
10. #77 - Charlie Roberts

=== Old Dominion 500 ===
The 1972 Old Dominion 500 was held on September 24 at Martinsville Speedway. Bobby Allison won the pole. Allison made a determined effort for a ninth win of 1972 as he started on the pole and led 432 laps. Petty cut a tire and had to pit under green, and when he came back out he was just ahead of Allison. NASCAR waved the blue "move over" flag but Petty raced Allison to stay on the lead lap. A yellow put Petty back on the lead lap and he stormed to challenge Allison for the lead. The two squared off and Petty wrestled away the win with 39 laps to go. Fred Lorenzen started 5th, and finished 27th, in what would be his final career NASCAR start.

Top ten results:

1. #43 - Richard Petty
2. #12 - Bobby Allison
3. #21 - David Pearson
4. #71 - Buddy Baker
5. #90 - Jimmy Hensley
6. #72 - Benny Parsons
7. #67 - Buddy Arrington
8. #48 - James Hylton
9. #64 - Elmo Langley
10. #24 - Cecil Gordon

=== Wilkes 400 ===
The Wilkes 400 was held on October 1 at North Wilkesboro Speedway. Buddy Baker won the pole. The Petty-Allison feud erupted into outright warfare over the final 30 laps. Allison led 203 laps until the race's lone yellow with 50 to go set off a hard fight between them; the lead changed nine times over the final 38 laps, but in the final three laps the race turned ugly when Allison, blocked off by the lapped car of Vic Parsons, plowed full bore into Petty and Parsons and all three hammered the wall, but kept going; Petty crashed into Allison on the final lap and stormed to the win. An intoxicated fan attacked Petty in victory lane and was clubbed viciously by Richard's brother Maurice using Richard's helmet.

Top ten results:

1. #43 - Richard Petty
2. #12 - Bobby Allison
3. #71 - Buddy Baker
4. #72 - Benny Parsons
5. #28 - John Sears
6. #06 - Dave Marcis
7. #24 - Cecil Gordon
8. #64 - Elmo Langley
9. #45 - Vic Parsons
10. #47 - Raymond Williams

=== National 500 ===
The National 500 was held on October 8 at Charlotte Motor Speedway. David Pearson won the pole. With prerace chatter buzzing about North Wilkesboro the week before, Allison squared off with Buddy Baker in a frantic final eight laps; the lead bounced around between the two before Allison sideslammed past Baker with four to go. Wood Brothers Racing entered two cars, for Pearson and A. J. Foyt, finishing 3-4.

Top ten results:

1. #12 - Bobby Allison
2. #71 - Buddy Baker
3. #21 - David Pearson
4. #41 - A.J. Foyt
5. #90 - Butch Hartman
6. #95 - Darrell Waltrip
7. #48 - James Hylton
8. #67 - Buddy Arrington
9. #18 - Joe Frasson
10. #43 - Richard Petty

=== American 500 ===
The American 500 was held on October 22 at North Carolina Speedway. David Pearson won the pole. Bobby Allison outlasted Richard Petty, Buddy Baker, and Pearson for his tenth win of the season. The four of them combined to lead 479 laps, while leading nine laps in Hoss Ellington's Chevrolet was Cale Yarborough, trying to return to Grand National racing after two fruitless seasons in USAC Indycars. The race was the 39th straight race where Allison led at least one lap.

Top ten results:

1. #12 - Bobby Allison
2. #43 - Richard Petty
3. #71 - Buddy Baker
4. #21 - David Pearson
5. #9 - Pete Hamilton
6. #28 - Cale Yarborough
7. #16 - Dave Marcis
8. #92 - Larry Smith
9. #05 - David Sisco
10. #67 - Buddy Arrington

=== Texas 500 ===
The Texas 500 was held on November 12 at Texas World Speedway. A.J. Foyt won the pole. Buddy Baker, Foyt, and Richard Petty led all 250 laps between them as they dueled for the lead and Baker edged out a close win. Bobby Allison, his relationship with Junior Johnson deteriorating all season, finished a distant fourth and left the team to re-form his own team, bringing his Coca-Cola sponsorship with him. The Johnson-wrenched Richard Howard team announced that Cale Yarborough, ninth in the Ellington Chevrolet, would take over the seat for 1973.

Top ten results:

1. #71 - Buddy Baker
2. #21 - A.J. Foyt
3. #43 - Richard Petty
4. #12 - Bobby Allison
5. #04 - Hershel McGriff
6. #72 - Benny Parsons
7. #14 - Coo Coo Marlin
8. #24 - Cecil Gordon
9. #28 - Cale Yarborough
10. #18 - Joe Frasson

Petty won the Grand National title over Allison by 128 points.

== Final point standings ==
=== Driver's standings ===
Finish	Driver	Points	Starts	Wins	Top 5s	Top 10s	Poles
1	Richard Petty	8701.40	31	8	25	28	3
2	Bobby Allison	8573.50	31	10	25	27	11
3	James Hylton	8158.70	31	1	9	23	0
4	Cecil Gordon	7326.05	31	0	4	16	0
5	Benny Parsons	6844.15	31	0	10	19	0
6	Walter Ballard	6781.45	31	0	0	7	0
7	Elmo Langley	6656.25	30	0	1	9	0
8	John Sears	6298.50	28	0	2	7	0
9	Dean Dalton	6295.05	29	0	0	4	0
10	Ben Arnold	6179.00	26	0	0	7	0
11	Frank Warren	5788.60	30	0	0	2	0
12	Jabe Thomas	5772.55	28	0	0	4	0
13	Bill Champion	5470.70	29	0	0	4	0
14	Raymond Williams	5712.65	28	0	0	5	0
15	Dave Marcis	5459.65	27	0	5	11	0
16	Charlie Roberts	5354.45	26	0	0	1	0
17	Henley Gray	5093.64	28	0	0	2	0
18	J.D. McDuffie	5075.85	27	0	1	2	0
19	Bobby Isaac	5050.85	27	1	10	10	9
20	David Pearson	4718.00	17	6	12	13	4
21	Ed Negre	4696.89	26	0	0	0	0
22	Buddy Arrington	4555.89	20	0	1	10	0
23	Larry Smith	4173.70	23	0	0	7	0
24	Buddy Baker	3936.70	17	2	8	9	1
25	Coo Coo Marlin	3852.90	20	0	2	5	0
26	David Ray Boggs	3739.00	24	0	0	0	0
27	Ron Keselowski	3475.60	22	0	1	3	0
28	Joe Frasson	3152.80	16	0	1	4	0
29	Richard D. Brown	2939.00	16	0	1	1	0
30	Neil Castles	2789.60	21	0	0	1	0
31	Jim Vandiver	2514.35	16	0	2	3	0
32	Clarence Lovell	2630.30	12	0	0	0	0
33	David Sisco	2310.75	12	0	0	2	0
34	LeeRoy Yarbrough	2157.50	18	0	5	9	0
35	George Altheide	1916.75	11	0	0	0	0
36	Donnie Allison	1849.15	10	0	2	3	0
37	Richard Childress	1521.25	15	0	0	0	0
38	Bill Shirey	1468.50	13	0	0	0	0
39	Fred Lorenzen	1333.55	8	0	3	4	0
40	Wendell Scott	1317.50	6	0	0	0	0
41	Tommy Gale	1298.00	6	0	0	0	0
42	Bill Dennis	1279.25	11	0	2	2	0
43	G.C. Spencer	1238.25	10	0	0	1	0
44	Dick May	1229.25	6	0	0	1	0
45	Hershel McGriff	1199.75	4	0	2	3	0
46	Les Covey	1128.00	7	0	0	0	0
47	Johnny Halford	1103.75	5	0	0	1	0
48	Pete Hamilton	1083.25	5	0	1	1	0
49	Dick Brooks	1023.50	14	0	0	1	0
50	Eddie Yarboro	1007.65	6	0	0	0	0
51	Cale Yarborough	949.50	5	0	1	4	0
52	Ray Elder	902.25	3	1	3	3	0
53	Paul Tyler	893.75	4	0	0	1	0
54	Marty Robbins	860.80	5	0	0	2	0
55	Bobby Mausgrover	833.05	6	0	0	0	0
56	Darrell Waltrip	827.00	5	0	1	3	0
57	Jim Whitt	813.50	3	0	0	0	0
58	H.B. Bailey	792.20	5	0	1	1	0
59	Dick Bown	791.75	3	0	0	0	0
60	Kevin Terris	783.50	3	0	0	1	0
61	Doc Faustina	770.50	5	0	0	0	0
62	Earle Canavan	755.50	7	0	0	0	0
63	Red Farmer	749.50	5	0	1	1	0
64	D.K. Ulrich	749.00	4	0	0	0	0
65	Charlie Glotzbach	739.00	3	0	2	2	0
66	Ramo Stott	675.25	5	0	2	3	0
67	Johnny Anderson	672.25	4	0	0	0	0
68	Dick Kranzler	642.75	3	0	0	0	0
69	Chuck Bown	636.75	3	0	0	0	0
70	John Soares, Jr.	609.25	3	0	0	0	0
71	Harry Schilling	599.50	3	0	0	0	0
72	Paul Jett	581.75	1	0	0	0	0
73	Earl Brooks	568.25	6	0	0	0	0
74	Bill Seifert	551.25	6	0	0	1	0
75	Carl Adams	530.00	2	0	0	1	0
76	Bill Butts	525.25	2	0	0	0	0
77	Carl Joiner	523.75	2	0	1	1	0
78	Dub Simpson	507.50	5	0	0	0	0
79	Frank James	459.75	2	0	0	1	0
80	J.C. Danielsen	458.50	2	0	0	0	0
81	Wayne Smith	439.50	3	0	0	1	0
82	Jack McCoy	419.00	3	0	0	0	0
83	Jimmy Finger	387.50	2	0	0	0	0
84	Paul Dorrity	362.00	2	0	0	0	0
85	Ronnie Daniel	344.75	2	0	0	0	0
86	Roy Mayne	338.25	4	0	0	0	0
87	Ron Gautsche	332.75	2	0	0	0	0
88	Markey James	301.00	2	0	0	0	0
89	Jimmy Crawford	296.25	1	0	0	0	0
90	Bob Kauf	290.50	2	0	0	0	0
91	Rick Newsom	289.00	1	0	0	0	0
92	Don Noel	274.75	2	0	0	0	0
93	Friday Hassler	255.25	1	0	0	1	0
94	Ronnie Chumley	252.00	1	0	0	0	0
95	Mel Larson	251.00	4	0	0	0	0
96	Les Loeser	239.00	1	0	0	0	0
97	Jimmy Insolo	226.50	1	0	0	0	0
98	Ivan Baldwin	215.75	1	0	0	0	0
99	Jimmy Hensley	215.25	2	0	1	1	0
100	Bob Greeley	212.50	1	0	0	0	0
101	Jerry Oliver	210.50	1	0	0	0	0
102	Larry Esau	201.50	1	0	0	0	0
103	Robert Brown	201.00	2	0	0	0	0
104	Tiny Lund	191.00	4	0	0	0	0
105	James Cox	165.50	2	0	0	0	0
106	Gene Romero	155.25	1	0	0	0	0
107	Phil Finney	150.25	1	0	0	0	0
108	G.T. Tallas	132.00	1	0	0	0	0
109	Ray Johnstone	127.50	1	0	0	0	0
110	John Hren	100.25	1	0	0	0	0
111	Clem Proctor	88.25	1	0	0	0	0
112	Bill Hollar	86.00	1	0	0	0	0
113	Sonny Easley	83.75	1	0	0	0	0
114	Ed Hessert	83.50	2	0	0	0	0
115	Dick Guldstrand	73.00	1	0	0	0	0
116	Sam Stanley	55.25	1	0	0	0	0
117	Bill Osborne	55.00	1	0	0	0	0
118	Robert Wales	25.50	2	0	0	0	0
119	Bill Ward	16.50	1	0	0	0	0
120	George Follmer	9.00	1	0	0	0	0
	Ray Hendrick		1	0	0	0	0
	Jim Hurtubise		2	0	0	1	0
	Ron Hutcherson		1	0	0	0	0
	Gordon Johncock		2	0	0	0	0
	Roger McCluskey		1	0	0	0	0
	Jackie Oliver		7	0	1	1	0
	Vic Parsons		1	0	0	1	0
	Jim Paschal		1	0	0	0	0
	Ken Rush		1	0	0	0	0
	Johnny Rutherford		1	0	0	0	0
	Bobby Unser		1	0	0	0	0
	Butch Hartman		1	0	1	1	0
	Ron Grana		1	0	0	0	0
	Cliff Garner		1	0	0	0	0
	Buck Baker		5	0	0	0	0
	Max Berrier		1	0	0	0	0
	Lem Blankenship		1	0	0	0	0
	Tru Cheek		1	0	0	0	0
	A. J. Cox		1	0	0	0	0
	Larry Dickson		1	0	0	0	0
	Mark Donohue		4	0	0	0	0
	Fred Drake		1	0	0	0	0
	Vic Elford		1	0	0	1	0
	Paul Feldner		1	0	0	0	0
	A. J. Foyt		6	2	5	5	3
	Don White		1	0	0	0	0

== See also ==
- 1972 NASCAR Winston West Series
- 1972 NASCAR Grand National East Series
