= Richard Giachetti =

Former racecar owner from Michigan

Richard Giachetti is a former NASCAR Winston Cup Series race car owner and one half of the Giachetti Brothers. He is from Detroit, Michigan.

== Career ==
With a career spanning from 1968 to 1972, Giachetti has employed some of the better NASCAR drivers of that era. Drivers under his employment included: Bill Seifert, David Pearson, Frog Fagan, Lennie Pond, and Jack Ingram. LeeRoy Yarbrough and British-born driver Brian Redman have also driven for Giachetti. These drivers contributed to exactly 3,909.0 miles or 6,290.9 kilometres of racing action, which is the equivalent of 3024 laps of professional stock car racing experience. Earnings for Giachetti were $17,467 ($131,301.26 when adjusted for inflation) with his vehicles starting in 26th place and ending in 24th place on average.
