= NASCAR Cup Series at Trenton Speedway =

Former NASCAR race

Northern 300

NASCAR Winston Cup Series
- Venue: Trenton Speedway
- First race: 1958
- Last race: 1972
- Distance: 300 miles (805 km)
- Laps: 200
- Previous names: Northern 500 (1958); Unnamed/Unknown (1959); Northern 300 (1967–1969, 1971–1972); Schaefer 300 (1970)

The Northern 300 was a NASCAR Winston Cup Series stock car race held in 1958, 1959, and from 1967 to 1972 at Trenton Speedway in Trenton, New Jersey. The debut race in 1958 was 500 laps and 500 miles (804.7 km) in length, which was cut down to 150 laps, 150 miles (241.4 km) for 1959. The 1967 and 1968 races were both 300 laps, covering 300 miles (482.8 km). The track was lengthened from 1 mile to 1.5 miles for 1969, and the final four races were cut down from 300 to 200 laps, while still covering a 300-mile distance.

A race in Trenton was on the 1973 schedule but was rained out on race day and ultimately cancelled. A 1974 race was on the Winston Cup schedule before the season, but was replaced by the Purolator 500 at Pocono Raceway. Richard Petty was the only driver to win more than once at Trenton, winning three times.

== Past winners ==
Year	Date	No.	Driver	Team	Manufacturer	Race Distance		Race Time	Average Speed (mph)	Report	Ref
Year	Date	No.	Driver	Team	Manufacturer	Laps	Miles (km)	Race Time	Average Speed (mph)	Report	Ref
1958	May 30	22	Fireball Roberts	Frank Strickland	Chevrolet	500	500 (804.672)	5:54:56	84.522	Report	
1959	May 17	59	Tom Pistone	Carl Rupert	Ford	150	150 (241.401)	1:43:02	87.35	Report	
1960 – 1966	Not held										
1967	July 9	43	Richard Petty	Petty Enterprises	Plymouth	300	300 (482.803)	3:08:50	95.322	Report	
1968	July 14	98	LeeRoy Yarbrough	Junior Johnson & Associates	Ford	300	300 (482.803)	3:22:04	89.079	Report	
1969	July 13	17	David Pearson	Holman-Moody	Ford	200	300 (482.803)	2:28:45	121.008	Report	
1970	July 12	43	Richard Petty	Petty Enterprises	Plymouth	200	300 (482.803)	2:29:06	120.724	Report	
1971	July 18	43	Richard Petty	Petty Enterprises	Plymouth	200	300 (482.803)	2:29:34	120.347	Report	
1972	July 16	12	Bobby Allison	Richard Howard	Chevrolet	200	300 (482.803)	2:57:41	114.03	Report	

=== Multiple winners (drivers) ===
# Wins	Driver	Years won	Ref(s)
3	Richard Petty	1967, 1970, 1971	

=== Multiple winners (teams) ===
# Wins	Team	Years won	Ref(s)
3	Petty Enterprises	1967, 1970, 1971	

=== Manufacturer wins ===
# Wins	Manufacturer	Years won	Ref(s)
3	Plymouth	1967, 1970, 1971	
3	Ford	1959, 1968, 1969	
2	Chevrolet	1958, 1972	
