= NASCAR Cup Series at Texas World Speedway =

NASCAR Winston Cup Series stock car race

Budweiser NASCAR 400

NASCAR Winston Cup Series
- Venue: Texas World Speedway
- Location: College Station, Texas, United States
- Corporate sponsor: Budweiser
- First race: 1969
- Last race: 1981
- Distance: 500 miles (800 km) (1969, 1971–1973); 400 miles (640 km) (1979–1981)
- Laps: 250 (1969, 1971–1973); 200 (1979–1981)
- Previous names: Fall race: Texas 500 (1969, 1971–1972); June race: Lone Star 500 (1972); Alamo 500 (1973); Texas 400 (1979); NASCAR 400 (1980); Budweiser NASCAR 400 (1981)
- Most wins (driver): Richard Petty (3)
- Most wins (team): Petty Enterprises (3)
- Most wins (manufacturer): Dodge (3)

Circuit information
- Surface: Asphalt
- Length: 2.0 mi (3.2 km)
- Turns: 4

Stock car racing events in the then-NASCAR Winston Cup Series were held at Texas World Speedway in College Station, Texas from 1969 to 1973 and again from 1979 to 1981. The track was replaced on the schedule in 1982 with the Pocono 500 at Pocono International Raceway. The final race in June 1981 was known as the Budweiser NASCAR 400.

== Past winners ==
Year	Date	No.	Driver	Team	Manufacturer	Race Distance		Race Time	Average Speed (mph)	Report	Ref
Year	Date	No.	Driver	Team	Manufacturer	Laps	Miles (km)	Race Time	Average Speed (mph)	Report	Ref
1969	December 7	71	Bobby Isaac	Nord Krauskopf	Dodge	250	500 (804.672)	3:27:56	144.277	Report	
1970	Not held										
1971	December 12	43	Richard Petty	Petty Enterprises	Plymouth	250	500 (804.672)	3:28:20	144	Report	
1972	June 25	43	Richard Petty	Petty Enterprises	Plymouth	250	500 (804.672)	3:28:04	144.185	Report	
1972	November 12	71	Buddy Baker	Nord Krauskopf	Dodge	250	500 (804.672)	3:24:00	147.059	Report	
1973	June 10	43	Richard Petty	Petty Enterprises	Dodge	250	500 (804.672)	3:26:44	142.114	Report	
1974 – 1978	Not held										
1979	June 3	88	Darrell Waltrip	DiGard Motorsports	Chevrolet	200	400 (643.737)	2:33:39	156.216	Report	
1980	June 1	11	Cale Yarborough	Junior Johnson & Associates	Chevrolet	200	400 (643.737)	2:30:54	159.046	Report	
1981	June 7	15	Benny Parsons	Bud Moore Engineering	Ford	200	400 (643.737)	3:01:10	132.475	Report	

=== Multiple winners (drivers) ===
# Wins	Manufacturer	Years won	Ref
3	Richard Petty	1971, June 1972, 1973	

=== Manufacturer wins ===
# Wins	Manufacturer	Years won	Ref
3	Dodge	1969, November 1972, 1973	
2	Chevrolet	1979, 1980	
2	Plymouth	1971, June 1972	
1	Ford	1981	
