= Larry Smith (racing driver) =

American NASCAR driver (1940-1973)

Larry Grayson Smith
- Born: June 16, 1940; Lenoir, North Carolina, U.S.
- Died: August 12, 1973 (aged 33); Lincoln, Alabama, U.S.
- Cause of death: Racing Accident
- Awards: 1972 NASCAR Winston Cup Rookie of the Year

NASCAR Cup Series career
- 38 races run over 3 years
- Best finish: 23rd - 1972 Winston Cup Series season
- First race: 1971 World 600 (Charlotte)
- Last race: 1973 Talladega 500 (Alabama)
| Wins | Top tens | Poles |
|---|---|---|
| 0 | 9 | 0 |

Larry Grayson Smith (June 16, 1940 – August 12, 1973) was an American professional stock car racing driver. He made his debut in the 1971 World 600 in the #92 Ford, finishing 22nd. He would go on to run three more races that year, acquiring one top-ten finish. In 1972, he was named the first NASCAR Winston Cup Rookie of the Year, running 23 races and posting seven top-ten finishes. The next year, Morris H. Keen, a pit crew member and former gas man for Donnie Allison, went to Carling Black Label in Atlanta, talked to the President of the Atlanta office and acquired a sponsorship for Larry Smith.

Later that year, while running the Talladega 500, Smith spun his 1971 Mercury on lap 14 and slapped the Turn 1 retaining wall. The crew believed the damaged car could be repaired for later participation in the race, however, he was transported to the infield hospital and pronounced dead. It was confirmed that he had died of massive head injuries.

An August 23, 1973 news report indicated that Smith's helmet had been sent to an independent testing laboratory for examination, to determine what role his helmet had in the injuries he sustained. It further reported that a study was underway to determine if safer helmets for drivers could be found.

A 1975 report stated that doctors determined that Smith's skull was "abnormally soft", and that it had been fractured several times before his fatal wreck, which would have been detected during a modern physical examination required for an FIA competition licence, required for selected Cup Series races. Research into basal skull fracture, which was reportedly what killed Smith, became more prevalent after the death of Renault engineer Patrick Jacquemart at Mid-Ohio Sports Car Course in 1981 when the Renault 5 IMSA GTU car crashed in the Esses. That death led to Jim Downing and his brother-in-law Robert Hubbard to develop the HANS Device, and today, frontal head restraints under FIA Specification 8858-2010 are required for drivers.

It is rumored, but not confirmed, that the head injuries that killed Smith came because he tore the inner-lining out of his helmet, which had been bothering him for some time. He was pronounced dead on arrival at the Talladega Superspeedway infield hospital. No other drivers were involved in the crash.

Smith is one of several drivers featured in the 1975 book The World's Number One, Flat-Out, All-Time Great Stock Car Racing Book by Jerry Bledsoe. Bledsoe describes the struggles Smith went through in his run for Rookie Of The Year in 1972.

| Preceded by Friday Hassler | NASCAR Cup Series fatal accidents 1973 | Succeeded by Tiny Lund |
