= Ben Arnold (racing driver) =

Racing driver

- Born: July 30, 1936
- Died: March 20, 2011 (aged 74)

NASCAR Cup Series career
- 132 races run over 6 years
- Best finish: 10th (1972)
- First race: 1968 untitled race (Montgomery)
- Last race: 1973 Winston 500 (Alabama)
Wins	Top tens	Poles
0	21	0

Ben Arnold (July 30, 1936 – March 20, 2011) was an American professional stock car racing driver. He was a driver in the NASCAR Winston Cup Series from 1968 to 1973.
