= Ron Keselowski =

Former NASCAR driver

- Born: Ronald William Keselowski; September 12, 1946 (age 80); Troy, Michigan, U.S.

NASCAR Cup Series career
- 68 races run over 5 years
- Best finish: 27th (1971, 1972)
- First race: 1970 Daytona 500 Qualifier #1 (Daytona)
- Last race: 1974 National 500 (Charlotte)
Wins	Top tens	Poles
0	11	0
- Statistics up to date as of November 24, 2012.

Ronald William Keselowski (born September 12, 1946) is an American former NASCAR Winston Cup driver who raced from 1970 to 1974. He is the uncle of current and retired NASCAR Cup Series drivers Brad and Brian Keselowski along with being the brother of the late NASCAR Craftsman Truck Series driver Bob Keselowski.

== Career ==
As a driver, Keselowski would acquire two top-five finishes in addition to eleven top-ten finishes. His total earnings for his NASCAR career was considered to be $62,790 ($409,914.47 when the amount is converted to today's money). Keselowski has raced a total of 14,167.8 miles (22,800.9 km) in his career and averaged a 24th-place finish in all of his career Winston Cup races. While he led nine laps, he has never won a race under NASCAR sanction; in April 1974 he did win the ACME Super Saver 500 for USAC stock cars at Pocono. His most active season was in 1972, where he competed in 22 out of the 31 races held that year. Most of his top-ten finishes came in 1971 (with an obvious exception for the 1971 Daytona 500 where he was only able to complete a single lap of the race). In the 1973 Winston Cup season, Keselowski finished 45th place in the season standings and with 879 championship points (6294 points behind the 1973 champion Benny Parsons).

In addition to being a race car driver, Keselowski was also an owner from 1995 to 2000. Among his employees at K-Automotive Motorsports were Terry Cook, Hermie Sadler, Bob Keselowski, and Dennis Setzer. As an owner, Ron's total earnings was considered to be $698,813 ($1,306,476.48 when inflation is taken into consideration). Other stats made by Ron Keselowski as an owner included three top-five finishes, 22 top-ten finishes, 156 laps as the leader of the race (using three different drivers), and 101 races attended. Although Ron never cracked the $1,000,000 mark as either a driver or an owner, his legacy to the sport would become an inspiration to his nephews Brad and Brian, in addition to his brother Bob. He & his ex-wife Sandi, but friend, have two children who were with him for many years in the racing circuit. Sandi & their children follow Brad weekly.
