= Markey James =

American racing driver (1941–2018)

- Born: November 4, 1941; Medford, Oregon, U.S.
- Died: June 29, 2018 (aged 76)
- Awards: 1974 NASCAR Winston West Series Rookie of the Year

NASCAR Cup Series career
- 5 races run over 4 years
- Best finish: 88th (1972)
- First race: 1971 Winston Golden State 400 (Riverside)
- Last race: 1974 Tuborg 400 (Riverside)
Wins	Top tens	Poles
0	0	0

ARCA Menards Series West career
- 64 races run over 5 years
- Best finish: 6th (1974)
- First race: 1971 Ascot 200 (Gardena)
- Last race: 1975 Manzanita 100 (Manzanita)
Wins	Top tens	Poles
0	30	0
- Statistics up to date as of May 29, 2026.

Markey Lee James (November 4, 1941 – June 29, 2018) was an American professional stock car racing driver. He competed in the NASCAR Winston Cup Series and NASCAR Winston West Series in the 1970s.

== Racing career ==
James began racing in the NASCAR Winston West Series in 1971, driving for Jim Calder. In nine races, he scored five top-ten finished and led the only five laps of his career. In running these races, he also made his NASCAR Winston Cup Series debut at Riverside International Raceway after failing to qualify at Ontario Motor Speedway, finishing last after retiring with engine issues after one lap. James ran fifteen of thirty West Series races in 1972, scoring four top-ten finishes. These starts included two combination races with the Winston Cup Series, as he failed to qualify at Ontario, but would finish twenty-fourth and fortieth in the Riverside races. James ran only twelve West races in 1973, but saw improvement in results, finishing top-ten in nine of these races, including seven top-fives. In his lone Cup start of the year, he finished twentieth at Riverside. James ran twenty-six of twenty-eight West races in 1974, scoring twelve top-ten finishes. He finished sixth in the points standings and was awarded rookie of the year. He made his final Winston Cup start at Riverside, scoring a career-best eighteenth-place finish. James made his final two Winston West starts in 1975, finishing twelfth at Laguna Seca Raceway and fourteenth at Manzanita Speedway. His final recorded start in racing is a NASCAR Grand American Stock Car National Championship race at Medford Speedway in 1980, where he finished seventh.

== Death ==
James died on June 29, 2018.

== Motorsports career results ==
=== NASCAR ===
(key) (Bold – Pole position awarded by qualifying time. Italics – Pole position earned by points standings or practice time. * – Most laps led.)

==== Winston Cup Series ====
NASCAR Winston Cup Series results
Year	Team	No.	Make	1	2	3	4	5	6	7	8	9	10	11	12	13	14	15	16	17	18	19	20	21	22	23	24	25	26	27	28	29	30	31	32	33	34	35	36	37	38	39	40	41	42	43	44	45	46	47	48	NWCSC	Pts	Ref
1971	James Racing	31	Chevy	RSD	DAY	DAY	DAY	ONT; DNQ	RCH	CAR	HCY	BRI	ATL	CLB	GPS	SMR	NWS	MAR	DAR	SBO	TAL	ASH	KPT	CLT	DOV	MCH																										NA	NA	
1971	Jim Calder	10	Chevy																								RSD; 40	HOU	GPS	DAY	BRI	AST	ISP	TRN	NSV	ATL	BGS	ONA	MCH	TAL	CLB	HCY	DAR	MAR	CLT	DOV	CAR	MGR	RCH	NWS	TWS	NA	NA	
1972	James Racing	31	Chevy	RSD; DNQ	DAY	RCH																																														88th	301	
1972	James Racing	34W	Chevy				ONT; 24	CAR	ATL	BRI	DAR	NWS	MAR	TAL	CLT	DOV	MCH																																			88th	301	
1972	James Racing	31W	Chevy															RSD; 40	TWS	DAY	BRI	TRN	ATL	TAL	MCH	NSV	DAR	RCH	DOV	MAR	NWS	CLT	CAR	TWS																		88th	301	
1973	James Racing	31	Chevy	RSD	DAY	RCH	CAR	BRI	ATL	NWS	DAR	MAR	TAL	NSV	CLT	DOV	TWS	RSD; 20	MCH	DAY	BRI	ATL	TAL	NSV	DAR	RCH	DOV	NWS	MAR	CLT	CAR																					102nd	NA	
1974	James Racing	64W	Ford	RSD	DAY	RCH	CAR	BRI	ATL	DAR	NWS	MAR	TAL	NSV	DOV	CLT	RSD; 18	MCH	DAY	BRI	NSV	ATL	POC	TAL	MCH	DAR	RCH	DOV	NWS	MAR	CLT	CAR	ONT																			119th	0.845	

==== Winston West Series ====
NASCAR Winston West Series results
Year	Team	No.	Make	1	2	3	4	5	6	7	8	9	10	11	12	13	14	15	16	17	18	19	20	21	22	23	24	25	26	27	28	29	30	NWWSC	Pts	Ref
1971	James Racing	31	Chevy	RSD	ONT; DNQ	OSS	SJS	CRS	S99																									21st	424	
1971	Jim Calder	107	Chevy							ASP; 12										CRS; 5	OSS; 5	SGS; 12	BKS; 7	CSP	EVG; 23	IFS	YAK; 4	SGB; 9	TWS					21st	424	
1971	Jim Calder	10	Chevy								RSD; 40	SAL	SPS	SKA	USP	POR	LSP	MED	DCS															21st	424	
1972	James Racing	31	Chevy	RSD; DNQ		SJS; 9	S99; 24	SMN; 18	TCR	YAK	EVG											CRS; 15	OSS; 13	SGS; 7	CSP	BKS; 12	EVG; 21	USP; 19	YAK; 14	POR; 17	ASP; 5	WCR; 15	SMN	14th	1165	
1972	James Racing	34W	Chevy		ONT; 24																													14th	1165	
1972	James Racing	31W	Chevy									RSD; 40	MED	POR	IFS	MER	SPS	LSP	WSP	SKA	RAS													14th	1165	
1973	James Racing	31	Chevy	AMP; 3	MAD; 2	S99; 18	AUR	KFS	CBS	USP	POR	SPS	WER	SGS; 3	CAJ; 13	OSS	CSP	BKS; 4	LAG; 6	EVG; 4	WSP; 5	YAK; 9	POR; 18	AMP; 3										14th	895.25	
1974	James Racing	64	Chevy	RSD	AMP; 12	S99; 8	MSP; 11	COR; 10	SBP; 17	ASP; 24		WER; 9	WSP; 9	SPS; 8	STA; 22	USP; 15	POR; 24	MED; 13	EUG; 13	CBS; 3	CAJ; 7	CRS; 12	ASP; 8	AMP; 4	CSP; 5	EVG; 24	YAK; 12	POR; 7	SGB; 7					6th	1617.25	
1974	James Racing	64W	Ford								RSD; 18																							6th	1617.25	
1974	James Racing	41	Chevy																											ASP; 14	ONT			6th	1617.25	
1975	James Racing	64	Chevy	RSD	LAG; 12	MSP; 14	ASP	RSD	ASP	USP	POR	EVG	SMS	CRS	CSP	ASP	EVG	YAK	POR	MSP	ONT													NA	133.5	
