= Bob Kauf =

American racing driver (1942–1999)

- Born: April 1, 1942; Pacoima, California, U.S.
- Died: January 24, 1999 (aged 56)

NASCAR Cup Series career
- 5 races run over 3 years
- Best finish: 90th (1972)
- First race: 1971 Motor Trend 500 (Riverside)
- Last race: 1973 Winston Western 500 (Riverside)
Wins	Top tens	Poles
0	0	0

ARCA Menards Series West career
- 54 races run over 5 years
- Best finish: 7th (1971)
- First race: 1970 Saugus 150 (Saugus)
- Last race: 1974 Cajon 150 (Cajon)
- First win: 1973 Mile High 150 (Aurora)
Wins	Top tens	Poles
1	21	0
- Statistics up to date as of June 2, 2026.

Bob Kauf (April 1, 1942 – January 24, 1999) was an American professional stock car racing driver. He primarily competed in the NASCAR Winston West Series during the 1970s.

== Racing career ==
Kauf began competing in the NASCAR Grand National West in 1970, failing to qualify for his first attempt at Evergreen Speedway before making three starts with a best result of thirteenth at Speedway 605. In 1971, Kauf ran twenty-three of twenty-six races in the renamed Winston West Series, scoring seven top-ten finishes. This schedule included his first starts in the NASCAR Winston Cup Series, both coming at Riverside International Raceway, although he failed to finish either race due to mechanical issues. He ran fifteen of thirty West races in 1972, scoring six top-tens. This schedule included three Winston Cup races, although he failed to qualify for the first race at Riverside and again failed to finish in his other starts due to mechanical problems. Kauf made twelve West starts in 1973, scoring his lone career win at Century 21 Speedway and scoring a career-high eight top-tens. He made his final Winston Cup start at Riverside, finishing thirty-seventh due to ignition issues. Kauf made his final NASCAR start in 1974 at Cajon Speedway, finishing twentieth due to overheating issues. He competed in a race at Saugus Speedway in 1979 in the Western States Open Competition Series, finishing twentieth.

== Motorsports career results ==
=== NASCAR ===
(key) (Bold – Pole position awarded by qualifying time. Italics – Pole position earned by points standings or practice time. * – Most laps led.)

==== Winston Cup Series ====
NASCAR Winston Cup Series results
Year	Team	No.	Make	1	2	3	4	5	6	7	8	9	10	11	12	13	14	15	16	17	18	19	20	21	22	23	24	25	26	27	28	29	30	31	32	33	34	35	36	37	38	39	40	41	42	43	44	45	46	47	48	NWCSC	Pts	Ref
1971	Paul Stockwell	95	Chevy	RSD; 27	DAY	DAY	DAY	ONT	RCH	CAR	HCY	BRI	ATL	CLB	GPS	SMR	NWS	MAR	DAR	SBO	TAL	ASH	KPT	CLT	DOV	MCH	RSD; 37	HOU	GPS	DAY	BRI	AST	ISP	TRN	NSV	ATL	BGS	ONA	MCH	TAL	CLB	HCY	DAR	MAR	CLT	DOV	CAR	MGR	RCH	NWS	TWS	NA	NA	
1972	Paul Stockwell	95	Chevy	RSD; DNQ	DAY	RCH																																														90th	290.5	
1972	Paul Stockwell	95W	Chevy				ONT; 29	CAR	ATL	BRI	DAR	NWS	MAR	TAL	CLT	DOV	MCH	RSD; 39	TWS	DAY	BRI	TRN	ATL	TAL	MCH	NSV	DAR	RCH	DOV	MAR	NWS	CLT	CAR	TWS																		90th	290.5	
1973	Paul Stockwell	95	Chevy	RSD; 37	DAY	RCH	CAR	BRI	ATL	NWS	DAR	MAR	TAL	NSV	CLT	DOV	TWS	RSD	MCH	DAY	BRI	ATL	TAL	NSV	DAR	RCH	DOV	NWS	MAR	CLT	CAR																					NA	NA	

==== Winston West Series ====
NASCAR Winston West Series results
Year	Team	No.	Make	1	2	3	4	5	6	7	8	9	10	11	12	13	14	15	16	17	18	19	20	21	22	23	24	25	26	27	28	29	30	NWWSC	Pts	Ref
1970	Paul Stockwell	95	Chevy	RSD	ASP	SGB	CSF	RSD	YAK	EVG; DNQ	JBA	CRS	OSS	SGS; 22	MED	SAL	SPS	TCR	WSP	S99	ASP; 22	SGB; 13												NA	NA	
1971	Paul Stockwell	95	Chevy	RSD; 27	ONT	OSS	SJS; 18	CRS; 4	S99; 12	ASP; 14	RSD; 37	SAL; 10	SPS; 13	SKA; 18	USP; 16	POR; 12	LSP; 10	MED; 15	DCS; 14	CRS; 17		SGS; 8		CSP; 5	EVG; 7	IFS; 15		SGB; 22	TWS					7th	908	
1971	Pete Torres	01	Ford																		OSS; 20		BKS; 19											7th	908	
1971	Martin Fay	99	Ford																								YAK; 8							7th	908	
1972	Paul Stockwell	95	Chevy	RSD; DNQ		SJS; 19	S99; 16	SMN; 7	TCR	YAK	EVG											CRS; 15	OSS; 5	SGS; 18	CSP; 11	BKS; 5	EVG; 10	USP; 5	YAK; 21	POR; 10	ASP; 21	WCR	SMN	13th	1165.5	
1972	Paul Stockwell	95W	Chevy		ONT; 29							RSD; 39	MED	POR	IFS	MER	SPS	LSP	WSP	SKA	RAS													13th	1165.5	
1973	Paul Stockwell	95	Chevy	AMP; 14	MAD; 3	S99; DNQ	AUR; 1	KFS; 15	CBS; 16		POR; 19	SPS	WER	SGS; 7	CAJ; 4	OSS; 9	CSP; 10	BKS; 7	LAG	EVG	WSP	YAK	POR	AMP										16th	812	
1973	Paul Stockwell	26	Chevy							USP; 9																								16th	812	
1974	Kauf Racing	34	Chevy	RSD	AMP	S99	MSP	COR	SBP	ASP	RSD	WER	WSP	SPS	STA	USP	POR	MED	EUG	CBS	CAJ; 20	CRS	ASP	AMP	CSP	EVG	YAK	POR	SGB	ASP	ONT			64th	50.25	
