= George Behlman =

American racing driver (1944–2014)

- Born: April 22, 1944; Lemon Grove, California, U.S.
- Died: May 10, 2014 (aged 70)
- Cause of death: Pulmonary fibrosis

NASCAR Cup Series career
- 2 races run over 2 years
- Best finish: 100th (1973)
- First race: 1973 Tuborg 400 (Riverside)
- Last race: 1974 Tuborg 400 (Riverside)
Wins	Top tens	Poles
0	0	0

ARCA Menards Series West career
- 43 races run over 2 years
- Best finish: 8th (1974)
- First race: 1973 Madera 100 (Madera)
- Last race: 1974 Ascot 100 Gardena)
Wins	Top tens	Poles
0	12	0
- Statistics up to date as of June 1, 2026.

Herman George Behlman Jr. (April 22, 1944 – May 10, 2014) was an American professional stock car racing driver. He competed in the NASCAR Winston Cup Series and NASCAR Winston West Series in 1973 and 1974. He was known by the nickname "The Blackberry Bush Bomber."

== Racing career ==
After serving in the Vietnam War with the United States Marines, Behlman began racing stock cars. In 1973, Behlman competed in seventeen of twenty-one races in the NASCAR Winston West Series, scoring two top-ten finishes. This schedule included a combination race with the NASCAR Winston Cup Series, where he scored a sixteenth-place finish at Riverside International Raceway. In 1974, Behlman ran all but the first and last race of the West Series season, scoring ten top-ten finishes. He finished eighth in the standings. This included a combination race at Riverside, where he finished twenty-ninth; he failed to qualify at Ontario Motor Speedway. He would continue competing in local racing at tracks such as Cajon Speedway into the 2000s.

== Death ==
Behlman was diagnosed with pulmonary fibrosis in 2012. He would lose his battle with the disease and died on May 10, 2014.

== Motorsports career results ==
=== NASCAR ===
(key) (Bold – Pole position awarded by qualifying time. Italics – Pole position earned by points standings or practice time. * – Most laps led.)

==== Winston Cup Series ====
NASCAR Winston Cup Series results
Year	Team	No.	Make	1	2	3	4	5	6	7	8	9	10	11	12	13	14	15	16	17	18	19	20	21	22	23	24	25	26	27	28	29	30	NWCSC	Pts	Ref
1973	Behlman Racing	01	Chevy	RSD	DAY	RCH	CAR	BRI	ATL	NWS	DAR	MAR	TAL	NSV	CLT	DOV	TWS	RSD; 16	MCH	DAY	BRI	ATL	TAL	NSV	DAR	RCH	DOV	NWS	MAR	CLT	CAR			100th	NA	
1974	Behlman Racing	01W	Chevy	RSD	DAY	RCH	CAR	BRI	ATL	DAR	NWS	MAR	TAL	NSV	DOV	CLT	RSD; 29	MCH	DAY	BRI	NSV	ATL	POC	TAL	MCH	DAR	RCH	DOV	NWS	MAR	CLT	CAR	ONT; DNQ	124th	0.695	

==== Winston West Series ====
NASCAR Winston West Series results
Year	Team	No.	Make	1	2	3	4	5	6	7	8	9	10	11	12	13	14	15	16	17	18	19	20	21	22	23	24	25	26	27	28	NWWSC	Pts	Ref
1973	Behlman Racing	01	Chevy	AMP	MAD; 20	S99; 17	AUR	KFS	CBS; 12	USP; 13	POR; 17	SPS; 12	WER; 17	SGS; 11	CAJ; 8	OSS; 12	CSP; 15	BKS; 16	LAG; 17	EVG; 18	WSP; 9			AMP; 14								11th	1010	
1973	Behlman Racing	0	Chevy																			YAK; 24	POR									11th	1010	
1974	Behlman Racing	01	Chevy	RSD	AMP; 21	S99; 10	MSP; 22	COR; 15	SBP; 4	ASP; 15		WER; 18	WSP; 11	SPS; 23	STA; 17	USP; 18	POR; 21	MED; 9	EUG; 15	CBS; 15	CAJ; 6	CRS; 4	ASP; 15	AMP; 11	CSP; 6	EVG; 6	YAK; 9	POR; 6	SGB; 14	ASP; 7	ONT	8th	1574	
1974	Behlman Racing	01W	Chevy								RSD; 29																					8th	1574	
