= Baxter Price =

American racing driver (born 1938)

- Born: November 29, 1938 (age 87); Monroe, North Carolina, U.S.

NASCAR Cup Series career
- 90 races run over 8 years
- Best finish: 23rd (1978)
- First race: 1973 Capital City 500 (Richmond)
- Last race: 1981 Budweiser NASCAR 400 (Texas World Speedway)
Wins	Top tens	Poles
0	0	0

Baxter Price (born November 29, 1938) is an American racing driver from Monroe, North Carolina who competed in the NASCAR Winston Cup Series. He made 90 Winston Cup starts from 1973 to 1981, never recording a top-ten finish.

== Racing career ==
Price ran nearly the full NASCAR Grand National East Series schedule in 1972, recording eleven top-tens and finishing fourth in points. Coupled with a partial schedule in that series, Price ran his first Winston Cup race in 1973, and fell victim to an early crash at Richmond International Raceway. The ensuing pileup with Darrell Waltrip left Price with severe burns. He ran with limited success the next two years of his career, then hit double digits in the start category in 1976. Price attempted 26 of the thirty races in 1978, and finished 23rd in points even though he never hit the top-ten. One race, he subbed for Dale Earnhardt. He found backing from Iron Peddlers in 1979 and continued to run races by the Eastern seaboard, near his hometown. Price scaled back his schedule in 1980, still with sponsors, but NASCAR had downsized its wheelbases, mandating new cars. The final year of his career was in 1981, failing to qualify for the Daytona 500, retiring with mechanical issues at Richmond and running the final race of his career for Jimmy Means and his Means Racing team, starting and parking at Texas World Speedway.

For a time, Price had the dubious distinction of being the driver with the most NASCAR Cup starts to have never recorded a top-ten finish. His ninety starts is seven more than Rick Newsom's 83. His best finish was eleventh in the 1978 running of the Virginia 500 (now Goody's Fast Pain Relief 500) at Martinsville Speedway. It has since been surpassed by Cole Whitt after the 2016 STP 500 at the same track Price achieved his best finish.
