= 1973 NASCAR Winston Cup Series =

American motorsport season

Seasons
- ← 1972 1974 →

The 1973 NASCAR Winston Cup Series was the 25th season of professional stock car racing in the United States and the 2nd modern-era Cup season. The season began on Sunday January 21 and ended on Sunday October 21. 31 races were scheduled in the 1973 season. 28 were held.

Benny Parsons was crowned Winston Cup champion at the end of the season finishing 67 points ahead of Cale Yarborough. Lennie Pond was named NASCAR Rookie of the Year, succeeding Larry Smith, who was fatally injured in the year's Talladega 500. David Pearson dominated the season winning 11 of the 18 races he entered. Of those wins, using modern NASCAR circuit classifications established in 2013 for age eligibility in tertiary series and expanded in 2026 for secondary series, five wins were on short tracks (two Rockingham, two Dover, and one Martinsville), four were on intermediate circuits (Darlington, Michigan, and two Atlanta wins), and two were on superspeedways (Daytona and Talladega).

== Pre-season changes ==
=== Rule changes ===
As part of the previously announced phasing out of the seven-litre formula to the 5833cc formula that will be completed at the end of this season, NASCAR after the end of the 1972 season announced adjusted maximum carburetor sleeve sizes depending upon the type of engine and manufacturer of a given car. As NASCAR President Bill France Jr. explained, the goal of the adjustments was to differentiate between engines manufactured specifically for racing, and "volume production" engines that came off a consumer assembly line. This was done "...so the events next year can continue to be representative of the type of the extremely close competition that has been typical of NASCAR racing."

In 1973, the NASCAR points system was changed. In 1972, only the number of laps completed in a race (regardless of position) counted toward the accumulation of points. In 1973, points were awarded both for the number of laps in a race completed, and for a finish in the top 50 in a race, a higher placing receiving more points. Additionally, the first-place finisher received a 25-point bonus.

=== Team changes ===
Bobby Allison left Richard Howard's racing team, and would drive his own Chevrolet in 1973. Bobby Allison's team would also furnish a car for his brother, Donnie Allison and the new DiGard Racing team. Taking Bobby's place on the Howard racing team would be Cale Yarborough, returning from the USAC Stock Car division.

Richard Petty, driver and owner of Petty Enterprises, expected to be racing exclusively in Dodge automobiles in 1973 (rather than the mix of Dodge and Plymouth the team had been).

Buddy Baker, who took over at Krauskopf Racing after Bobby Isaac left that team after the 1972 Southern 500, now signed up with Krauskopf for the full 1973 season, driving Dodges.

=== Retirements ===
Fred Lorenzen, a NASCAR notable, ended his career with the end of the 1972 season.

== Schedule ==
31 Winston Cup races were scheduled for the 1973 season. In the end it had 28 races, as well as a non-championship qualifying race. The schedule also includes two 125 Mile Qualifying Races, which are the qualifying races for the Daytona 500.

Key changes from 1972 include:

- Bristol and Atlanta swap their March/April race dates.
- The spring race at North Wilkesboro moved to the seventh race of the season.
- North Wilkesboro and Martinsville swap their September race dates.
- A second race at Fairgrounds Speedway returned to the Cup Series after a seven year absence, The race was held before the World 600 at Charlotte.
- The race at Texas World Speedway moved to round fourteen of the season.
- Riverside and Michigan swap their June race dates.
- Texas World Speedway's Texas 500 was removed after a single year.
- The Miller High Life 500 was set for March 4. Was not held because of financial difficulties (and an ownership change completed January 4, 1973) at Ontario Motor Speedway.
- The Northern 300 was Rained out on race day, then postponed until August 5 and finally cancelled at the request of the promoter on July 27 (insufficient time to promote the race).
- The Yankee 400 was cancelled on June 7 by track owner Roger Penske, citing the tight schedule of races the track had to accommodate in Summer 1973.

No.	Race title	Track	Date
1	Winston Western 500	Riverside International Raceway, Riverside	January 21
	125 Mile Qualifying Races	Daytona International Speedway, Daytona Beach	February 15
2	Daytona 500	Daytona International Speedway, Daytona Beach	February 18
3	Richmond 500	Richmond Fairgrounds Raceway, Richmond	February 25
4	Southeastern 500	Bristol International Speedway, Bristol	March 11–25
5	Carolina 500	North Carolina Motor Speedway, Rockingham	March 18
6	Atlanta 500	Atlanta International Raceway, Hampton	April 1
7	Gwyn Staley 400	North Wilkesboro Speedway, North Wilkesboro	April 8
8	Rebel 500	Darlington Raceway, Darlington	April 15
9	Virginia 500	Martinsville Speedway, Ridgeway	April 29
10	Winston 500	Alabama International Motor Speedway, Talladega	May 6
11	Music City USA 420	Fairgrounds Speedway, Nashville	May 12
12	World 600	Charlotte Motor Speedway, Concord	May 27
13	Mason-Dixon 500	Dover Downs International Speedway, Dover	June 3
14	Alamo 500	Texas World Speedway, College Station	June 10
15	Tuborg 400	Riverside International Raceway, Riverside	June 17
16	Motor State 400	Michigan International Speedway, Brooklyn	June 24
17	Firecracker 400	Daytona International Speedway, Daytona Beach	July 4
18	Volunteer 500	Bristol International Speedway, Bristol	July 8
19	Dixie 500	Atlanta International Raceway, Hampton	July 22
20	Talladega 500	Alabama International Motor Speedway, Talladega	August 12
21	Nashville 420	Fairgrounds Speedway, Nashville	August 25
22	Southern 500	Darlington Raceway, Darlington	September 3
23	Capital City 500	Richmond Fairgrounds Raceway, Richmond	September 9
24	Delaware 500	Dover Downs International Speedway, Dover	September 16
25	Wilkes 400	North Wilkesboro Speedway, North Wilkesboro	September 23
26	Old Dominion 500	Martinsville Speedway, Ridgeway	September 30
27	National 500	Charlotte Motor Speedway, Concord	October 6
28	American 500	North Carolina Motor Speedway, Rockingham	October 20

== Race recaps ==
Winston Western 500 - In only his fifth NASCAR Cup start, Indycar and road racing star Mark Donohue drove an AMC Matador with a set of disc brakes - new for racing at the time - and led 138 laps en route to the win. David Pearson won the pole but never led and fell out with clutch failure, while Richard Petty started fifth and led 39 laps before his engine failed while leading on Lap 95. Bobby Allison finished second driving a self-fielded Chevrolet following a surprise divorce from the Richard Howard team. Cale Yarborough, new driver for Howard's team with the cars renumbered to #11, fell out with transmission failure.

1. 16 - Mark Donohue
2. 12 - Bobby Allison
3. 96 - Ray Elder
4. 41 - Bobby Unser
5. 38 - Jimmy Insolo
6. 7 - Jack McCoy
7. 64 - Elmo Langley
8. 24 - Richard White
9. 84 - Jim Danielsen
10. 19 - Henley Gray

Daytona 500 - Buddy Baker won the 500 pole in the Harry Hyde Dodge formerly driven by Bobby Isaac. Baker led 156 laps but was closely pursued by Cale Yarborough until his engine failure with 45 laps to go. Richard Petty, sporting a mustache called his Fu Manchu look, took up pursuit and grabbed the lead on a fast late pitstop; Baker blew his engine with six laps to go and finished a distant sixth as Petty grabbed his fourth 500 win.

1. 43 - Richard Petty
2. 15 - Bobby Isaac
3. 6 - Dick Brooks
4. 50 - A. J. Foyt
5. 04 - Hershel McGriff
6. 71 - Buddy Baker
7. 48 - James Hylton
8. 90 - Ramo Stott
9. 67 - Buddy Arrington
10. 45 - Vic Parsons

Richmond 500 - Petty and Yarborough combined to lead 378 laps at the Richmond Fairgrounds. Bobby Allison won the pole and led 66 laps but finished 49 laps down. Petty lost time when he ran into a backmarker's car under yellow and needed bumper repairs; he nonetheless rallied past Baker for the win.

1. 43 - Richard Petty
2. 71 - Buddy Baker
3. 11 - Cale Yarborough
4. 15 - Bobby Isaac
5. 2 - Dave Marcis
6. 17 - Bill Dennis
7. 54 - Lennie Pond
8. 24 - Cecil Gordon
9. 48 - James Hylton
10. 72 - Benny Parsons

Miller High Life 500 - Ownership changes at Ontario Motor Speedway led to cancellation of NASCAR's annual race in 1973, leading to an open date for March 4.

Southeastern 500 - Cale Yarborough won the pole and then led all 52 laps before rain scuttled the race on March 11. Inclement weather continued to plague the event, and after two more days of rain, the remaining 448 laps were rescheduled for the next open date, which was the week after the next race.

Carolina 500 - After two dismal races (he was not entered at Richmond, as the Wood Brothers only participated in races at circuits longer than one mile except for Martinsville) David Pearson began his record-setting assault on the 1973 season, leading 491 of 492 laps to easily win the Carolina 500.

1. 21 - David Pearson
2. 11 - Cale Yarborough
3. 71 - Buddy Baker
4. 12 - Bobby Allison
5. 90 - Ramo Stott
6. 95 - Darrell Waltrip
7. 31 - Jim Vandiver
8. 18 - Joe Frasson
9. 96 - Richard Childress
10. 17 - Bill Dennis

Southeastern 500 (continued) - The off-week for March 18 led to a continuation of the race that started on March 4. Cale Yarborough, who led all 52 laps before the race was scuttled, led all 448 laps of the second part for a two-lap win. Numerous crashes, notably a bad wreck to Buddy Baker's Dodge, thinned the field.

1. 11 - Cale Yarborough
2. 43 - Richard Petty
3. 12 - Bobby Allison
4. 2 - Dave Marcis
5. 72 - Benny Parsons
6. 54 - Lennie Pond
7. 14 - Coo Coo Marlin
8. 48 - James Hylton
9. 45 - Vic Parsons
10. 49 - John Utsman

Atlanta 500 - David Pearson and Cale Yarborough combined to lead 309 laps in a close battle before Pearson broke away for a two-lap win over Bobby Isaac. Cale finished seven laps down. It was the first time a pass for the lead occurred (excluding pit stops) since Richmond.

1. 21 - David Pearson
2. 15 - Bobby Isaac
3. 72 - Benny Parsons
4. 71 - Buddy Baker
5. 11 - Cale Yarborough
6. 14 - Coo Coo Marlin
7. 90 - Ramo Stott
8. 24 - Cecil Gordon
9. 61 - Clarence Lovell
10. 31 - Jim Vandiver

Gwyn Staley 400 - Bobby Allison and Richard Petty returned to the scene of their famed slugfest from the previous October, but this time Petty put the race away early, leading 387 laps and finishing at least four laps ahead of the field. Yvon Duhamel, the legendary Canadian motorcycle racer, finished tenth in his only NASCAR Cup Series start.

1. 43 - Richard Petty
2. 72 - Benny Parsons
3. 71 - Buddy Baker
4. 12 - Bobby Allison
5. 24 - Cecil Gordon
6. 11 - Cale Yarborough
7. 54 - Lennie Pond
8. 48 - James Hylton
9. 59 - Donnie Allison
10. 90 - Yvon Duhamel

Rebel 500 - Darlington Raceway's spring 400-miler was lengthened to 500 miles and David Pearson led the last 176 laps and grabbed his fourth career win in the event. Crashes permeated the race to where only twelve of forty entries finished. Second-place Benny Parsons was thirteen laps down, third-place Bobby Allison spent the last eighteen laps on pit road with engine failure, and seventh-place Richard Petty crashed out in a big melee in Turn One with 27 laps to go.

1. 21 - David Pearson
2. 72 - Benny Parsons
3. 12 - Bobby Allison
4. 96 - Richard Childress
5. 70 - J. D. McDuffie
6. 7 - Dean Dalton
7. 43 - Richard Petty
8. 71 - Buddy Baker
9. 25 - Roy Mayne
10. 47 - Raymond Williams

Virginia 500 - The Wood Brothers once again were entered in the only short track on their schedule, as it was closest to their Stuart shops. David Pearson made up a lap with just over 100 laps to go when a yellow flew for an infield spectator needing transport to a local hospital; with no tunnel the track needed the yellow for an ambulance to leave. Cale Yarborough had led 311 laps but Pearson would lead almost the entire final 106 laps after the yellow; the yellow angered team manager Junior Johnson.

1. 21 - David Pearson
2. 11 - Cale Yarborough
3. 15 - Bobby Isaac
4. 71 - Buddy Baker
5. 24 - Cecil Gordon
6. 72 - Benny Parsons
7. 90 - Jimmy Hensley
8. 30 - Walter Ballard
9. 45 - Vic Parsons
10. 48 - James Hylton

Winston 500 - The starting field of 50 was expanded to 60 by track management, and it proved controversial in the subsequent 500, as early in the race Ramo Stott blew his engine on the backstretch and two separate packs of cars hit the oil and crashed; Wendell Scott's car was blasted by several other cars and Scott suffered serious injuries; Buddy Baker and Cale Yarborough were eliminated;, and when they got out of their cars they had to dodge additional crashing cars. Bobby Allison ripped the track for the enormity of the field - "They (filled the field) all right, all over the backstretch." David Pearson lost the lead draft (Baker saying Pearson fouled out the spark plugs on his Mercury and got them replaced under the lengthy yellow), and with all legitimate challengers eliminated he led 111 laps to an easy win, his fifth of the season and fifth in his consecutive starts.

1. 21 - David Pearson
2. 08 - Donnie Allison
3. 72 - Benny Parsons
4. 61 - Clarence Lovell
5. 24 - Cecil Gordon
6. 14 - Coo Coo Marlin
7. 5 - Dick Simon
8. 31 - Jim Vandiver
9. 45 - Vic Parsons
10. 09 - Charles Barrett

Music City USA 420 - After the 1972 summer race was delayed by pavement issues and serious incidents during weekly racing, the Nashville Fairgrounds, which had been lengthened from a half mile to .596 miles and banking raised to 35 degrees in 1969, the banking was reduced to 18 degrees, where it continues today. Cale Yarborough led 416 of the 420 laps to an easy win, only his second of the season.

1. 11 - Cale Yarborough
2. 72 - Benny Parsons
3. 71 - Buddy Baker
4. 24 - Cecil Gordon
5. 12 - Bobby Allison
6. 14 - Coo Coo Marlin
7. 15 - Bobby Isaac
8. 05 - David Sisco
9. 70 - J. D. McDuffie
10. 45 - Vic Parsons

World 600 - Buddy Baker and Richard Petty combined to lead 354 laps. Petty slid into the wall in Three and finished a distant 13th. Baker led the final sixteen laps and beat Pearson for the win, his first of the season.

1. 71 - Buddy Baker
2. 21 - David Pearson
3. 11 - Cale Yarborough
4. 15 - Bobby Isaac
5. 72 - Benny Parsons
6. 31 - Jim Vandiver
7. 95 - Darrell Waltrip
8. 24 - Cecil Gordon
9. 90 - Dick Brooks
10. 05 - David Sisco

Mason-Dixon 500 - Bobby Allison and Cale Yarborough led 175 laps between them but could do nothing about Pearson as he led all but three of the last 241 laps to yet another win.

1. 21 - David Pearson
2. 11 - Cale Yarborough
3. 12 - Bobby Allison
4. 43 - Richard Petty
5. 24 - Cecil Gordon
6. 72 - Benny Parsons
7. 71 - Buddy Baker
8. 2 - Dave Marcis
9. 7 - Dean Dalton
10. 05 - David Sisco

Alamo 500 - The financially troubled Texas World Speedway hosted another Petty-Baker showdown as Buddy led 168 laps; the lead changed back and forth between the two before Baker lost power in the final 30 laps and finished a distant sixth behind Petty, who posted only his third superspeedway win in the last two seasons. Rookie Darrell Waltrip and independent driver Joe Frasson completed the podium, both of which scored their first career Cup Series podium finish. It was Frasson's only podium, while Waltrip had the first of 197 career podium finishes (84 of then wins) in a Hall of Fame career. The track was unable to host its annual November 500-miler later that season.

1. 43 - Richard Petty
2. 95 - Darrell Waltrip
3. 18 - Joe Frasson
4. 11 - Cale Yarborough
5. 24 - Cecil Gordon
6. 71 - Buddy Baker
7. 72 - Benny Parsons
8. 9 - Ramo Stott
9. 05 - David Sisco
10. 70 - J. D. McDuffie

Tuborg 400 - Bobby Allison ended his season-long winless streak when Richard Petty hit a barrier at the Riverside road course and Cale Yarborough blew his engine. Allison led 85 laps to Petty's 57 and Cale's eleven for his first win since the 1972 American 500. Finishing third was Benny Parsons, and largely unnoticed was that Parsons was clawing into contention for the season championship.

1. 12 - Bobby Allison
2. 43 - Richard Petty
3. 72 - Benny Parsons
4. 38 - Jimmy Insolo
5. 24 - Cecil Gordon
6. 42 - Richard White
7. 04 - Hershel McGriff
8. 48 - James Hylton
9. 07 - Jack McCoy
10. 03 - Chuck Bown

Motor State 400 - Once again Buddy Baker grabbed the lead at will, leading 119 laps, and once again it would not be enough as David Pearson led the last 23 laps for the fifth win for the Wood Brothers team (and Pearson's fourth, third with the #21) at Michigan International Speedway; but it was the combination's first Michigan win since Roger Penske took control of the speedway after the final collapse of Larry LoPatin's raceway empire. Finishing fifth was Ron Keselowski, part of a racing family that included his brother Bob and later Bob's sons Brian and Brad, the last of whom became a NASCAR Cup Series champion and later team owner.

1. 21 - David Pearson
2. 71 - Buddy Baker
3. 43 - Richard Petty
4. 12 - Bobby Allison
5. 99 - Ron Keselowski
6. 11 - Cale Yarborough
7. 88 - Donnie Allison
8. 24 - Cecil Gordon
9. 72 - Benny Parsons
10. 70 - J. D. McDuffie

Medal of Honor Firecracker 400 - In 1971, NASCAR began a transitional formula change from the 427 cubic inches (7,000 cc) engine to the smaller 358 cubic inches (5,870 cc) engine. The phase out of the larger engine will be complete at the end of the season. NASCAR changed from carburetor sleeves to restrictor plates for the larger engines being phased out. Bobby Allison and Cale Yarborough swept the front row in their Chevrolets and battled for the lead in the first 65 laps before Cale crashed out, but from there David Pearson and February's 500 champ Petty took over; Allison fell out with engine failure and Pearson beat Petty for his second straight Firecracker win and eighth win of the season, his highest win total since 1969.

1. 21 - David Pearson
2. 43 - Richard Petty
3. 71 - Buddy Baker
4. 28 - Gordon Johncock
5. 72 - Benny Parsons
6. 2 - Dave Marcis
7. 45 - Vic Parsons
8. 42 - Marty Robbins
9. 90 - Dick Brooks
10. 18 - Joe Frasson

Volunteer 500 - Lost amid the season's other drama was that Benny Parsons was in the thick of the points race despite not winning a race. That part of his ledger was checked off at Bristol amid brutal heat and humidity; John A. Utsman had to drive relief for Parsons as the combination led 320 laps. Early contenders Bobby Allison and Cale Yarborough crashed out while battling for the lead at Lap 331, leaving the #72 of Parsons and Utsman alone; runner-up L. D. Ottinger finished seven laps down.

1. 72 - Benny Parsons
2. 45 - L. D. Ottinger
3. 24 - Cecil Gordon
4. 54 - Lennie Pond
5. 70 - J. D. McDuffie
6. 8 - Ed Negre
7. 47 - Raymond Williams
8. 48 - James Hylton
9. 64 - Elmo Langley
10. 19 - Henley Gray

Northern 300 - Bobby Allison qualified on pole. The Sunday race at Trenton Speedway was rained out, first postponed to August 5, and later cancelled entirely, as the race promoter did not believe they had time to properly promote the race.

Dixie 500 - David Pearson's domination of intermediate tracks continued as he broke out of a tight duel with Cale Yarborough and led the final 165 laps for the win at Atlanta. Richard Petty won the pole but blew his engine and hit the guardrail after 72 laps, while Bobby Isaac led 29 laps but crashed himself after 52 laps. Also falling out was Buddy Baker with a broken axle, his sixth failure to finish a race so far in 1973.

1. 21 - David Pearson
2. 11 - Cale Yarborough
3. 88 - Donnie Allison
4. 18 - Joe Frasson
5. 90 - Jody Ridley
6. 54 - Lennie Pond
7. 70 - J. D. McDuffie
8. 49 - G. C. Spencer
9. 25 - Jabe Thomas
10. 92 - Larry Smith

Talladega 500 - Tragedy blackened the fifth running of Talladega's summer 500-miler. Early in the race, the previous season's Rookie of the Year Larry Smith hit the wall in Turn One and did not survive what appeared to be a harmless crash. The race, held amid heavy Alabama heat, was a ferocious affair; the lead changed 64 times, a motorsports record for the time, among fourteen drivers. Bobby Allison won the pole while Donnie Allison for virtually the first time all year had a strong run in the DiGard Racing Chevrolet. Both fell out on Lap 156 when Donnie's engine failed, and the resulting debris led to a crash that swept up Bobby. Buddy Baker roared from 21st to the lead but even more dramatic was that Dick Brooks, driving the Crawford Brothers' Plymouth in a last-minute deal and starting 24th, roared through the field; he stormed to the lead when Baker broke a steering line and Pearson slowed, stealing what would be his only career win. A bigger story developed as well; Bobby Isaac parked Bud Moore's Ford and said he was quitting racing (Coo Coo Marlin got into the #15 and finished the race).

1. 22 - Dick Brooks
2. 71 - Buddy Baker
3. 21 - David Pearson
4. 48 - James Hylton
5. 05 - David Sisco
6. 11 - Cale Yarborough
7. 95 - Darrell Waltrip
8. 24 - Cecil Gordon
9. 30 - Walter Ballard
10. 02 - L.D. Ottinger

Nashville 420 - Buddy Baker ended months of frustration at Nashville's Fairgrounds speedway. He took the lead from pole-sitter Cale Yarborough with 160 laps to go and beat Richard Petty by four laps. Cale faltered and finished 23 laps down in 14th. Bobby Allison finished 22nd after another engine failure.

1. 71 - Buddy Baker
2. 43 - Richard Petty
3. 14 - Coo Coo Marlin
4. 05 - David Sisco
5. 8 - Ed Negre
6. 48 - James Hylton
7. 30 - Walter Ballard
8. 24 - Cecil Gordon
9. 68 - Alton Jones
10. 10 - Bill Champion

Southern 500 - What was expected to be another David Pearson intermediate triumph after he won the pole instead became a runaway by Cale Yarborough as Cale led 277 laps for a runaway win. Finishing fifth was Benny Parsons, quietly surging to the points lead, while finishing eighth was rookie Darrell Waltrip, now driving the Bud Moore Ford.

1. 11 - Cale Yarborough
2. 21 - David Pearson
3. 71 - Buddy Baker
4. 43 - Richard Petty
5. 72 - Benny Parsons
6. 12 - Bobby Allison
7. 14 - Coo Coo Marlin
8. 15 - Darrell Waltrip
9. 61 - Dick Brooks
10. 70 - J. D. McDuffie

Capital City 500 - Richard Petty led 429 laps to his first win since June, beating Cale Yarborough by two laps and pole-sitter Bobby Allison by three. Benny Parsons finished fourth, his eleventh top-five finish of the season to go with the mid-summer Bristol win; the consistency kept boosting him in the points race.

1. 43 - Richard Petty
2. 11 - Cale Yarborough
3. 12 - Bobby Allison
4. 72 - Benny Parsons
5. 67 - Buddy Arrington
6. 30 - Walter Ballard
7. 24 - Cecil Gordon
8. 48 - James Hylton
9. 19 - Henley Gray
10. 47 - Raymond Williams

Delaware 500 - Parsons grabbed another top five (finishing fourth after leading seven laps; they were his first laps led since winning at Bristol in July) while David Pearson grabbed another win, his tenth of the season. Bobby Allison and Buddy Baker led 134 laps between them and completed the podium, being the only other cars on the lead lap.

1. 21 - David Pearson
2. 12 - Bobby Allison
3. 71 - Buddy Baker
4. 72 - Benny Parsons
5. 70 - J. D. McDuffie
6. 14 - Coo Coo Marlin
7. 43 - Richard Petty
8. 64 - Elmo Langley
9. 54 - Lennie Pond
10. 90 - Eddie Pettyjohn

Wilkes 400 - A year after their vicious showdown in the same race, Bobby Allison got a measure of revenge on Richard Petty and he swept to the win on the final lap, only his second of the season. The two led 383 laps between them. Cale Yarborough led eight laps and finished third at team manager Junior Johnson's home track.

1. 12 - Bobby Allison
2. 43 - Richard Petty
3. 11 - Cale Yarborough
4. 71 - Buddy Baker
5. 72 - Benny Parsons
6. 54 - Lennie Pond
7. 2 - Dave Marcis
8. 90 - Dick Brooks
9. 24 - Cecil Gordon
10. 70 - J. D. McDuffie

Old Dominion 500 - A late yellow allowed Richard Petty to close up on Cale Yarborough and grab the win in the final 48 laps. Cale had led 366 laps to Petty's 108. Bobby Allison and Buddy Baker endured another frustrating day as they finished over 24 laps down but still together in the top four.

1. 43 - Richard Petty
2. 11 - Cale Yarborough
3. 12 - Bobby Allison
4. 71 - Buddy Baker
5. 07 - Jack McCoy
6. 72 - Benny Parsons
7. 24 - Cecil Gordon
8. 48 - James Hylton
9. 67 - Buddy Arrington
10. 70 - J. D. McDuffie

National 500 - Mounting frustration in several quarters spilled into an ugly weekend at Charlotte Motor Speedway. Charlie Glotzbach appeared to win the pole in Hoss Ellington's Chevrolet but NASCAR ruled that the car, which used the larger engine being phased out at the end of the season, featured an illegal sliding restrictor plate and Glotzbach had to start 34th; he later crashed with David Pearson 46 laps into the race and the two drivers nearly came to blows exiting their cars. Harry Hyde clashed with inspectors the entire week and finally parked Buddy Baker's Dodge 228 laps in and was officially disqualified. Cale Yarborough led 257 laps and Richard Petty led 52 as the track paid $100 per lap led; with Cale the winner. Third-place Bobby Allison filed a protest demanding a re-inspection of the top two finishers. The inspection process on Cale's Chevrolet - owned by track president Richard Howard and wrenched by Junior Johnson - lasted an unusually long number of hours and NASCAR finally issued a statement that the results of the inspection of Cale's car would be sent to NASCAR headquarters for additional study. A furious Allison promptly filed a lawsuit against NASCAR but the suit was withdrawn after a closed-door meeting between Allison and Bill France Jr. of NASCAR, and the inspection process was changed at the next race. Robert Yates, the head engine builder for Junior Johnson's team at the time, noted in an interview with author Tom Jensen for the 2002 book Cheating: An Inside Look At The Bad Things Good NASCAR Winston Cup Racers Do In Pursuit of Speed that the engine was indeed illegal. Petty stated at the time that only three of his engine's eight cylinders were checked, and that they were of varying sizes that averaged out to the NASCAR-mandated limit of 431 CID.

1. 11 - Cale Yarborough
2. 43 - Richard Petty
3. 12 - Bobby Allison
4. 72 - Benny Parsons
5. 1 - Dick Trickle
6. 54 - Lennie Pond
7. 67 - Buddy Arrington
8. 64 - Elmo Langley
9. 24 - Cecil Gordon
10. 19 - Henley Gray

American 500 - Amid the Charlotte controversy, Benny Parsons led the points race despite only one win. Pre-race inspections all weekend were noticeably tougher than usual with this race being the final race of the 427 cubic inch formula; Cale Yarborough had to re-qualify on the second day of qualifying and ran faster than on pole day; he started 18th. None of it could stop David Pearson from leading 396 laps to Cale's 85. Parsons crashed hard into the lapped car of Johnny Barnes and the crash ripped out the right side of his Chevrolet; he felt his title hopes were over but his crew and other crews worked to rebuild the car to run enough laps to win the title; Parsons 28th, some 182 laps down, and won the title after Richard Petty broke a camshaft and finished 35th, Petty's eighth engine-related failure of the 1973 season.

1. 21 - David Pearson
2. 71 - Buddy Baker
3. 11 - Cale Yarborough
4. 12 - Bobby Allison
5. 2 - Dave Marcis
6. 88 - Donnie Allison
7. 32 - Dick Brooks
8. 90 - Charlie Glotzbach
9. 54 - Lennie Pond
10. 14 - Coo Coo Marlin

== Season recap ==
No.	Race	Pole position	Most laps led	Winning driver	Manufacturer	Report
1	Winston Western 500	David Pearson	Mark Donohue	Mark Donohue	AMC	Report
2	Daytona 500	Buddy Baker	Buddy Baker	Richard Petty	Dodge	Report
3	Richmond 500	Bobby Allison	Richard Petty	Richard Petty	Dodge	Report
4	Carolina 500	David Pearson	David Pearson	David Pearson	Mercury	Report
5	Southeastern 500	Cale Yarborough	Cale Yarborough	Cale Yarborough	Chevrolet	Report
6	Atlanta 500	Gordon Johncock	David Pearson	David Pearson	Mercury	Report
7	Gwyn Staley 400	Bobby Allison	Richard Petty	Richard Petty	Dodge	Report
8	Rebel 500	David Pearson	David Pearson	David Pearson	Mercury	Report
9	Virginia 500	David Pearson	Cale Yarborough	David Pearson	Mercury	Report
10	Winston 500	Buddy Baker	David Pearson	David Pearson	Mercury	Report
11	Music City USA 420	Cale Yarborough	Cale Yarborough	Cale Yarborough	Chevrolet	Report
12	World 600	Buddy Baker	Buddy Baker	Buddy Baker	Dodge	Report
13	Mason-Dixon 500	David Pearson	David Pearson	David Pearson	Mercury	Report
14	Alamo 500	Buddy Baker	Buddy Baker	Richard Petty	Dodge	Report
15	Tuborg 400	Richard Petty	Bobby Allison	Bobby Allison	Chevrolet	Report
16	Motor State 400	Buddy Baker	Buddy Baker	David Pearson	Mercury	Report
17	Firecracker 400	Bobby Allison	David Pearson	David Pearson	Mercury	Report
18	Volunteer 500	Cale Yarborough	Benny Parsons	Benny Parsons	Chevrolet	Report
	Northern 300	Bobby Allison	Race not held			
19	Dixie 500	Richard Petty	David Pearson	David Pearson	Mercury	Report
20	Talladega 500	Bobby Allison	David Pearson	Dick Brooks	Plymouth	Report
21	Nashville 420	Cale Yarborough	Cale Yarborough	Buddy Baker	Dodge	Report
22	Southern 500	David Pearson	Cale Yarborough	Cale Yarborough	Chevrolet	Report
23	Capital City 500	Bobby Allison	Richard Petty	Richard Petty	Dodge	Report
24	Delaware 500	David Pearson	David Pearson	David Pearson	Mercury	Report
25	Wilkes 400	Bobby Allison	Richard Petty	Bobby Allison	Chevrolet	Report
26	Old Dominion 500	Cale Yarborough	Cale Yarborough	Richard Petty	Dodge	Report
27	National 500	David Pearson	Cale Yarborough	Cale Yarborough	Chevrolet	Report
28	American 500	Richard Petty	David Pearson	David Pearson	Mercury	Report

== 1973 Winston Cup Championship ==
(key) Bold – Pole position awarded by time. Italics – Pole position set by owner's points. * – Most laps led. ** - All laps led.

Pos.	Driver	RIV	DAY	RCH	CAR	BRI	ATL	NWS	DAR	MAR	TAL	NSV	CLT	DOV	TWS	RIV	MCH	DAY	BRI	ATL	TAL	NSV	DAR	RCH	DOV	NWS	MAR	CLT	CAR	Pts
1	Benny Parsons	14	30	10	31	5	3	2	2	6	3	2	5	6	7	3	9	5	1*	25	38	19	5	4	4	5	6	4	28	7173.8
2	Cale Yarborough	24	22	3	2	**1****	5	6	19	2*	41	**1***	3	2	4	24	6	36	**19**	2	6	**14***	1*	2	25	3	**2***	1*	3	7106.65
3	Cecil Gordon	20	21	8	22	29	8	5	21	5	5	4	8	5	5	5	8	13	3	24	8	8	11	7	27	9	7	9	11	7046.8
4	James Hylton	12	7	9	11	8	21	8	23	10	45	12	12	12	15	8	15	12	8	21	4	6	12	8	19	12	8	13	19	6972.75
5	Richard Petty	21	1	1*	23	2	34	1*	7	21	35	13	13	4	1	**2**	3	2	21	33	14	2	4	1*	7	2*	1	2	**35**	6877.95
6	Buddy Baker	35	**6***	2	3	25	4	3	8	4	**40**	3	**1***	7	**6***	38	**2***	3		34	2	1	3	17	3	4	4	41	2	6327.6
7	Bobby Allison	2	25	**15**	4	3	35	**4**	3	32	42	5		3	26	1*	4	**30**	20	27	**29**	22	6	**3**	2	**1**	3	3	4	6272.3
8	Walter Ballard	19	19	11	39	17	14	18	25	8	48	22	18	28	16	15	30	26	14	15	9	7	17	6	17	13	18	23	22	5955.7
9	Elmo Langley	7	DNQ	12	21	12	26	13	35	11	19	17	14	17	27	19	19	16	9	38	21	21	31	15	8	14	13	8	12	5826.85
10	J. D. McDuffie	32	26	29	29	21		23	5	13	18	9	21	19	10	12	10	40	5	7	11	18	10	29	5	10	10	29	20	5743.9
11	Jabe Thomas		15	13	13	22		29	16	30	15	18	31	11	12		24	31	13	9	16	26	13	18	14	16	16	25	18	5637
12	Buddy Arrington		9	17	12	14	15	25	13	18	49	14	32	21	17		16	18	30	11	27	12	14	5	40	25	9	7	24	5483.9
13	David Pearson	**22**	33		**1***		1*		**1***	**1**	1*		2	**1***			1	1*		**1***	3*		**2**		**1***		31	**36**	1*	5382.8
14	Henley Gray	10	DNQ	16	18	19		24		14	34	25		13	19	27	34	23	10	13	28	13	20	9	21	15	14	10	17	5215.5
15	Richard Childress		DNQ		9	20	13	16	4	24	22	23	11	18	35	17	14	27	25	23	31	20	40	12	16	17	25	18	14	5169.5
16	Frank Warren		16	22	15	26	16	21	32	16	24	20	23	24	13		22	19	15	14	15	15	24	14	37	21	15	35	43	4992.14
17	David Sisco		11	28	24	11				25	36	8	10	10	9		17	11	11	26	5	4	28	16	29	27	28	21	15	4986.45
18	Ed Negre		17		16		24	19	20	22	11	27	19	33	37		18	29	6	18	25	5	26	21	11	22	26	27	21	4942.55
19	Dean Dalton		DNQ	27	26	27	23	17	6	29	16	15	30	9	22	40	23	17	23	22	17	27	19	31	34	19	20	30	23	4712.3
20	Charlie Roberts	11	DNQ	18	17	18	25	27	26	20	53	21	Wth	14	18		27		17	19	42	17	16	11	22	26	22	14	34	4695.39
21	Bill Champion	16	DNQ	14	32	23	29	14	39	34	37		16	31	14	11	29	24	18	17	22	10	22	30	39	29	36	26	30	4447.85
22	Coo Coo Marlin		29		14	7	6				6	6	33	35	28		11	38	27	30	40	3	7		6	11	23	19	10	4233.89
23	Lennie Pond **(R)** ✝			7	20	6		7	36	19	46		38	20	24		37	20	4	6	47	23	37	28	9	6	30	6	9	4013.85
24	Dave Marcis	40	27	5	37	4	12	20	40	26	17	11	28	8	33		36	6	28	32	12					7	33	24	5	3973.9
25	Raymond Williams		DNQ		35	28	17	26	10	31	28		17	25	25		39	22	7	20	46	30	25	10	23	18	29	33		3708.25
26	Bobby Isaac	27	2	4	30	15	2	28	33	3	26	7	4	29	32	33		39	22	35	13									3352.4
27	Dick Brooks		3		5		7		11		23		9					9			1	32	9	27		8		34	7	3200.7
28	Darrell Waltrip **(R)**		12		6	30	33		24		31	24	7		2			25		31	7	24	8	26	20	30		38	27	2968.2
29	Joe Frasson		13		8		28		34		43		25		3		35	10		4	43		23					22	40	2952.2
30	Vic Parsons **(R)**		10	30	34	9		12	28	9	9	10	26	30			20	7		29		29	34	32	36					2929.25
31	Jim Vandiver		28		7		10				8		6					32			35		27					17	32	2508.85
32	John Sears		31	19		13	36	11	22	28	20			22			38	33		36				20	31	28	12		33	2465.25
33	Larry Smith		14		19		20		37		58		15			13	13	21		10	49									2367.85
34	Rick Newsom		DNQ					30		12		16		39	34		28		12	12		11		13	15		32			1931
35	Donnie Allison		DNQ	25		24		9		27	2			38			7	28		3	26				12		34	32	6	1755.75
36	D. K. Ulrich										33			27	31		26		24		39		18	25	35	23	21			1543.9
37	G. C. Spencer								15				29	26				14	29	8			39		30			39	41	1503.15
38	Mel Larson										29			32	36						44	31	21	19	13	20	17			1182.05
39	Johnny Barnes **(R)**		DNQ		DNQ		19		18		27										30		35		28			15	42	1174.2
40	Eddie Bond		DNQ		28						12						31				23							20	29	1163.5
41	Earle Canavan		DNQ				22		12					34			12								24					1144.7
42	Earl Brooks							15	38	15	56											16		22	33	24	19			1075.75
43	Charlie Glotzbach								31				24										30					37	8	903.35
44	Randy Tissot																			16	20		15							887.85
45	Ron Keselowski		20				31				50						5				Wth				32					879.75
46	Jimmy Crawford				41									16	30										26			16		846
47	Richard D. Brown			20		16				33	60		39	36			40		26	DNQ	Wth	25	38	33			35		39	827.75
48	Clarence Lovell		DNQ		38		9		30		4																			813.5
49	Bill Dennis		35	6	10					17																				809.75
50	Jack McCoy	6														9											5			793.25
51	Hershel McGriff	23	5													7														
52	Ramo Stott		8								44				8						45									
53	Ed Sczech														20			34		28	33									
54	Tony Bettenhausen Jr. **(R)**						40				30				23		32												16	
55	Neil Castles		37	24	36			22					34	37									Wth					31	38	
56	L. D. Ottinger																		2		10							28		
57	Tommy Gale		DNQ								13						25			37	48		36							
58	Ray Elder	3	18													36														
59	Jody Ridley																			5	37								31	
60	Bobby Mausgrover						37				54										24				18					
61	Wendell Scott								14		55																	12		
62	Jimmy Insolo	5														4														
63	Richard White	8														6														
64	John Utsman		24		33	10					DNQ																			
65	Charles Barrett						18				10		27							40										
66	Ronnie Daniel									23	57								16					23			24			
67	Paul Tyler		DNQ						27		25		35	23							50								37	
68	Earl Ross		39								14						33													
69	Carl Adams	13														22														
70	Richie Panch								17						38								33						36	
71	Dick May										21											28	32	24			DNQ			
72	Red Farmer		32								32										32									
73	Chuck Bown	29														10														
74	Alton Jones										39	26	40								19	9								
75	Dick Bown	17														32														
76	Eddie Pettyjohn													40											10					
77	H. B. Bailey		DNQ												11					39										
78	Pee Wee Wentz																										27		26	
79	Glenn Francis	31														18														
80	Johnny Anderson	28														21														
81	Dick Trickle																											5		
82	Charlie Blanton												20																	
83	Marty Robbins		34												29			8			36									
84	Billy Scott												22																	
85	Harry Gant																											11		
86	Jim Danielsen	9																												
87	Bill Ward										51										18									
88	Ray Hendrick			26																							11			
89	Bill Hollar													15													DNQ			
90	Sonny Easley	25														29														
91	Gerald Thompson	15	DNQ																											
92	Bob Whitlow														21															
93	Roy Mayne						32		9									15												
94	Tiny Lund		36	23	40		38						36																	
95	Jim Whitt	18														37														
96	Leon Fox															14														
97	Johnny Benson Sr.																21													
98	Maynard Troyer		23																											
99	John Soares Jr.	26														31														
100	George Behlman															16														
101	Buck Baker				27																									
102	Markey James															20														
103	Jimmy Hensley									7																				
104	Don Noel															23														
105	Hugh Pearson	36														28														
106	Robert Brown											19										33								
107	Dick Kranzler															25														
108	Jack Simpson															26														
109	Yvon DuHamel							10																						
110	Bud Moore																						29							
111	Bob Davis										DNQ										34									
112	Sonny Hutchins			21																										
113	Ron Hornaday															30														
114	Pete Hamilton		40				39																							
115	John Hren	30																												
116	Carl Joiner Jr.	33																												
117	Harry Jefferson	34																												
118	Romie Alderman															34														
119	Nels Miller															35														
120	Peter Gregg												37																	
121	Toby Tobias																								38					
122	Baxter Price																							34						
123	Chuck Wahl															39														
124	Clem Proctor	38																												
125	Wayne Andrews																											40		
126	Slick Gardner		DNQ								47																			
127	Ben Arnold		DNQ								52																			
128	Eddie Yarboro										59																			
Ineligible for Winston Cup driver points
Pos.	Driver	RIV	DAY	RCH	CAR	BRI	ATL	NWS	DAR	MAR	TAL	NSV	CLT	DOV	TWS	RIV	MCH	DAY	BRI	ATL	TAL	NSV	DAR	RCH	DOV	NWS	MAR	CLT	CAR	Pts
	Gordon Johncock		38		25		11				38							4											25	
	A. J. Foyt		4				27											37												
	Mark Donohue	1*					30																							
	Dick Simon										7							35												
	Bobby Unser	4																												
	Johnny Rutherford																												13	
	Bobby Poole											28																		
	David Ray Boggs		DNQ						29				DNQ																	
	Bob Kauf	37																												
	Jerry Grant	39																												
	Phil Finney		DNQ																	DNQ	41									
Pos.	Driver	RIV	DAY	RCH	CAR	BRI	ATL	NWS	DAR	MAR	TAL	NSV	CLT	DOV	TWS	RIV	MCH	DAY	BRI	ATL	TAL	NSV	DAR	RCH	DOV	NWS	MAR	CLT	CAR	Pts
Source: ✝ Named NASCAR's 1973 Rookie of the Year

Results key

Key
Color	Result
Gold	Winner
Silver	Finished 2nd–5th
Bronze	Finished 6th–10th
Green	Finished 11th–20th
Blue	Finished 21st or worse
Purple	Did not finish (DNF)
Black	Disqualified (DSQ)
Red	Did not qualify (DNQ)
Tan	Withdrew From Race (Wth)
White	Qualified for another driver (QL)
White	Qualified but replaced due to injury or incident (INQ)
White	Relieved another driver (RL)
Blank	Did not participate (DNP)
Blank	Excluded (EX)
Blank	Did not arrive (DNA)

=== Manufacturers' Championship ===
Manufacturers would receive points for the highest placing driver with each manufacturer, from 9 points for a win, down to 1 point for a 6th-place finish. Points would be reduced if the highest placing driver placed lower than the corresponding manufacturer placing, or could be reduced by a penalty sanction.

Pos.	Manufacturer	Pts	Wins
1	Chevrolet	163	7
2	Dodge	153	8
3	Mercury	125	11
4	Ford	28	0
5	Plymouth	11	1
6	AMC	11	1

== See also ==
- 1973 NASCAR Winston West Series
