= 1972 Old Dominion 500 =

Auto race held at Martinsville Speedway in 1972

Race details
- Race 27 of 31 in the 1972 NASCAR Winston Cup Series season
- 1972 Old Dominion 500 program cover
- Date: September 24, 1972
- Official name: Old Dominion 500
- Location: Martinsville Speedway, Martinsville, Virginia
- Course: Permanent racing facility
- Course length: 0.525 miles (0.844 km)
- Distance: 500 laps, 262.5 mi (442.4 km)
- Weather: Mild with temperatures of 77 °F (25 °C); wind speeds of 8.9 miles per hour (14.3 km/h)
- Average speed: 69.989 miles per hour (112.636 km/h)
- Attendance: 31,000

Pole position
Driver	Bobby Allison	Howard & Egerton Racing

Most laps led
Driver	Bobby Allison	Howard & Egerton Racing
- Laps: 432

Winner
No. 43	Richard Petty	Petty Enterprises

Television in the United States
- Network: untelevised
- Announcers: none

The 1972 Old Dominion 500 was a NASCAR Winston Cup Series racing event that was held on September 24, 1972, at Martinsville Speedway in Martinsville, Virginia.

The race car drivers still had to commute to the races using the same stock cars that competed in a typical weekend's race through a policy of homologation (and under their own power). This policy was in effect until roughly 1975. By 1980, NASCAR had completely stopped tracking the year model of all the vehicles and most teams did not take stock cars to the track under their own power anymore.

== Background ==
Martinsville Speedway is one of five short tracks to hold NASCAR races. The standard track at Martinsville Speedway is a four-turn short track oval that is 0.526 miles (0.847 km) long. The track's turns are banked at eleven degrees, while the front stretch, the location of the finish line, is banked at zero degrees. The back stretch also has a zero degree banking.

== Race report ==
Five hundred laps were done on a paved track spanning 0.525 miles (0.845 km) in a time of three hours and forty-five minutes. Richard Petty would defeat Bobby Allison by a time of six seconds in front of 31,000 live audience members; making this race the closest Bobby Allison ever came to winning at Martinsville. Although Cecil Gordon had a competitive finish of 10th place during this event, his lackluster performance during the 1972 NASCAR Winston Cup Series season would eventually cost him a shot at winning the championship.

Exactly ten minutes from the race along with a flyover by the local military jets were used in the 1973 American film The Last American Hero. While Richard Petty and Bobby Allison got filmed most of the time, a moment involving Ray Hendrick's #2 vehicle crashing on lap 311 was also a notable event during the filming.

Allison would earn the pole position with a speed of 85.89 miles per hour (138.23 km/h). The average speed of the race, however, would be a mere 69.989 miles per hour (112.636 km/h). Eight cautions slowed the race for 58 laps in the entire race. All thirty-six of the qualifying drivers on the grid were male and born somewhere in the United States of America. Originally, 56 drivers auditioned for this race; including Joe Frasson, who was one of the ones who failed to qualify. Bill Shirey would be the unfortunate last-place finisher due to an overheating issue on lap 19. Fred Lorenzen would retire from NASCAR after this race. This was also LeeRoy Yarbrough's last race, never to be heard from again until his death. He ran most of the last two seasons in non-competitive cars yet he was one of the most fearless racers ever.

Richard Petty would go on to win the championship shortly after this race was over while Bobby Allison would find a new employer named Ralph Moody for the 1973 NASCAR Winston Cup Series season. The total purse of this racing event was $46,650 ($359,060 when considering inflation); the first-place finisher received $7,350 ($56,572 when considering inflation) while the last-place finisher received $425 ($3,271 when considering inflation).

Six of NASCAR's most notable crew chiefs were on attendance for this race; including Harry Hyde, Dale Inman, Vic Ballard and Lee Gordon.

=== Technological concerns ===
Improvements in tire and engine technology in the early 1970s had made NASCAR Cup Series vehicles overpowered compared to the limited space that Martinsville Speedway had for breathing space. Further technological advancements by 2013 have caused further concern for driver safety at Martinsville; indicating that the Monster Energy NASCAR Cup Series may have to use restrictor plates in Martinsville if tire/engine technology keeps its current pace of development.

=== Qualifying ===
Grid	No.	Driver	Manufacturer	Owner
1	12	Bobby Allison	'72 Chevrolet	Richard Howard
2	21	David Pearson	'71 Mercury	Wood Brothers
3	71	Buddy Baker	'70 Dodge	Nord Krauskopf
4	43	Richard Petty	'72 Plymouth	Petty Enterprises
5	28	Fred Lorenzen	'72 Chevrolet	Hoss Ellington
6	17	Bill Dennis	'72 Chevrolet	H.J. Brooking
7	90	Jimmy Hensley	'71 Ford	Junie Donlavey
8	98	Bobby Isaac	'72 Ford	Junie Donlavey
9	14	Coo Coo Marlin	'71 Chevrolet	H.B. Cunningham
10	48	James Hylton	'71 Ford	James Hylton

== Finishing order ==
Section reference:

POS	ST	#	DRIVER	SPONSOR / OWNER	CAR	LAPS	MONEY	STATUS	LED
1	4	43	Richard Petty	STP (Petty Enterprises)	'72 Plymouth	500	7350	running	64
2	1	12	Bobby Allison	Coca-Cola (Richard Howard)	'72 Chevrolet	500	10600	running	432
3	2	21	David Pearson	Purolator (Wood Brothers)	'71 Mercury	498	2775	running	4
4	3	71	Buddy Baker	K & K Insurance (Nord Krauskopf)	'70 Dodge	496	3225	running	0
5	7	90	Jimmy Hensley	Junie Donlavey	'71 Ford	493	1400	running	0
6	11	72	Benny Parsons	Pop Kola (L.G. DeWitt)	'71 Mercury	488	1250	running	0
7	18	67	Buddy Arrington	Buddy Arrington	'70 Dodge	485	900	running	0
8	10	48	James Hylton	Pop Kola (James Hylton)	'71 Ford	484	1100	running	0
9	14	64	Elmo Langley	Elmo Langley	'71 Ford	478	1050	running	0
10	19	24	Cecil Gordon	Cecil Gordon	'71 Mercury	477	1000	running	0
11	9	14	Coo Coo Marlin	Cunningham-Kelley (H.B. Cunningham)	'71 Chevrolet	476	725	running	0
12	25	10	Bill Champion	Bill Champion	'71 Ford	468	950	running	0
13	21	47	Raymond Williams	JetWay (Raymond Williams)	'71 Ford	467	925	running	0
14	12	70	J.D. McDuffie	J.D. McDuffie	'71 Chevrolet	460	900	running	0
15	20	4	John Sears	J. Marvin Mills Heating & Air (J. Marvin Mills)	'70 Plymouth	459	875	transmission	0
16	24	76	Ben Arnold	Ben Arnold	'71 Ford	457	850	running	0
17	31	06	Neil Castles	Howard Furniture (Neil Castles)	'72 Plymouth	456	875	running	0
18	34	8	Ed Negre	Ed Negre	'70 Dodge	450	965	running	0
19	28	77	Charlie Roberts	Charlie Roberts	'71 Ford	446	775	running	0
20	23	30	Walter Ballard	Ballard Racing (Vic Ballard)	'71 Mercury	444	750	running	0
21	29	25	Jabe Thomas	Don Robertson	'70 Plymouth	433	725	running	0
22	36	23	James Cox	Don Robertson	'70 Plymouth	430	595	running	0
23	30	19	Henley Gray	Henley Gray	'71 Ford	369	675	overheating	0
24	26	57	David Ray Boggs	David Ray Boggs	'70 Dodge	328	400	engine	0
25	17	2	Ray Hendrick	Dave Marcis	'70 Dodge	311	625	crash	0
26	22	55	Tiny Lund	Hank Richardson	'71 Chevrolet	272	350	rear end	0
27	5	28	Fred Lorenzen	Lemon Tree Inn (Hoss Ellington)	'72 Chevrolet	216	425	engine	0
28	15	7	Dean Dalton	Dean Dalton	'71 Mercury	134	550	overheating	0
29	13	16	Dave Marcis	American Motors (Roger Penske)	'72 Matador	108	275	rear end	0
30	16	45	LeeRoy Yarbrough	Bill Seifert	'71 Ford	108	510	crash	0
31	6	17	Bill Dennis	Emrick Chevrolet (H.J. Brooking)	'72 Chevrolet	105	250	crash	0
32	35	79	Frank Warren	Frank Warren	'70 Dodge	95	655	rear end	0
33	27	96	Richard Childress	Richard Childress	'71 Chevrolet	88	250	rear end	0
34	32	92	Larry Smith	Harley Smith	'71 Ford	77	450	engine	0
35	8	98	Bobby Isaac	Junie Donlavey	'72 Ford	19	250	overheating	0
36	33	74	Bill Shirey	Bill Shirey	'70 Plymouth	19	425	overheating	0

== Timeline ==
Section reference:

- Start: Bobby Allison was leading the starting grid as the green flag was waved.
- Lap 19: Bill Shirey and Bobby Isaac jointly overheated their vehicles.
- Lap 77: Larry Smith blew his vehicle's engine.
- Lap 88: Richard Childress caused the rear end of his vehicle to become dangerously loose.
- Lap 95: Frank Warren caused the rear end of his vehicle to become dangerously loose.
- Lap 105: Bill Dennis caused terminal vehicle damage.
- Lap 108: LeeRoy Yarbrough caused terminal vehicle damage; Dave Marcis caused the rear end of his vehicle to become dangerously loose.
- Lap 132: Richard Petty took over the lead from Bobby Allison.
- Lap 134: Dean Dalton overheated his vehicle.
- Lap 148: Bobby Allison took over the lead from Richard Petty.
- Lap 216: Fred Lorenzen blew his vehicle's engine.
- Lap 221: David Pearson took over the lead from Bobby Allison.
- Lap 222: Bobby Allison took over the lead from David Pearson.
- Lap 223: David Pearson took over the lead from Bobby Allison.
- Lap 225: Bobby Allison took over the lead from David Pearson.
- Lap 272: Tiny Lund caused the rear end of his vehicle to become dangerously loose.
- Lap 279: David Pearson took over the lead from Bobby Allison.
- Lap 280: Bobby Allison took over the lead from David Pearson.
- Lap 311: Ray Hedrick caused terminal vehicle damage.
- Lap 328: David Ray Boggs blew his vehicle's engine.
- Lap 369: Henley Gray overheated his vehicle.
- Lap 436: Richard Petty took over the lead from Bobby Allison.
- Lap 441: Bobby Allison took over the lead from Richard Petty.
- Lap 442: Richard Petty took over the lead from Bobby Allison.
- Lap 446: Bobby Allison took over the lead from Richard Petty.
- Lap 459: John Sears' vehicle developed problems with its transmission.
- Lap 462: Richard Petty took over the lead from Bobby Allison.
- Finish: Richard Petty was officially declared the winner of the race.

Preceded by 1972 Delaware 500	NASCAR Winston Cup Series Season; 1972	Succeeded by 1972 Wilkes 400
