= 1973 Winston 500 =

Auto race held at Talladega Superspeedway in 1973

Race details
- Race 10 of 28 in the 1973 NASCAR Winston Cup Series
- 1973 Winston 500 program cover
- Date: May 6, 1973
- Official name: Winston 500
- Location: Alabama International Motor Speedway, Talladega, Alabama
- Course: Permanent racing facility
- Course length: 2.660 miles (4.281 km)
- Distance: 188 laps, 500.080 mi (804.801 km)
- Weather: 74.8 °F (23.8 °C); wind speeds up to 5.9 miles per hour (9.5 km/h)
- Average speed: 131.956 miles per hour (212.363 km/h)
- Attendance: 77,000

Pole position
Driver	Buddy Baker	Nord Krauskopf
- Time: 49.505; 193.435 miles per hour (311.303 km/h)

Most laps led
Driver	David Pearson	Wood Brothers Racing
- Laps: 111

Winner
No. 21	David Pearson	Wood Brothers Racing

The 1973 Winston 500 was the tenth round of the 1973 NASCAR Winston Cup Series, which was held on May 6, 1973, at Alabama International Motor Speedway (AIMS) – now Talladega Superspeedway – in Talladega, Alabama.

The race was won by David Pearson, with his car being the only one on the lead lap at the end of the race.

Also notable was a fourth-place finish by Clarence Lovell, This was Lovell's best career finish and his only finish in the top five of a NASCAR Cup race. Lovell would die five days later on May 11, in a single vehicle truck accident.

Eddie Yarboro fell out of this race with a mechanical issue in the opening laps before the "Big One." This was Yarboro's only Cup start of the season and his last in the series.

== Background ==
For the 1973 Winston 500 race, the usual starting field of 50 was expanded to 60 by track management, and this would later prove controversial due to events in the race. Factions in the NASCAR management wanted to have a larger field that'd attract more fans to watch the races, and that a larger field with a bigger purse would catch the eyes of more teams. Of course, they were warned that starting 60 cars would be a strain at the track, and might be potentially hazardous for drivers (even when compared to NASCAR in the 21st century), but the NASCAR management ignored it, and, it resulted in this infamous race.

== Summary ==
=== Pre-race ceremonies ===
Then Alabama governor George Wallace would be named the grand marshal for the event, while his wife Cornelia Wallace would drive the pace car. Before the race, George, who ten years earlier had tried to lead the Stand in the Schoolhouse Door, put out his hand to the only black driver racing that day, Wendell Scott. The two shook hands, and a photographer took a picture. Scott succinctly said, "Times change."

=== "The Big One" ===
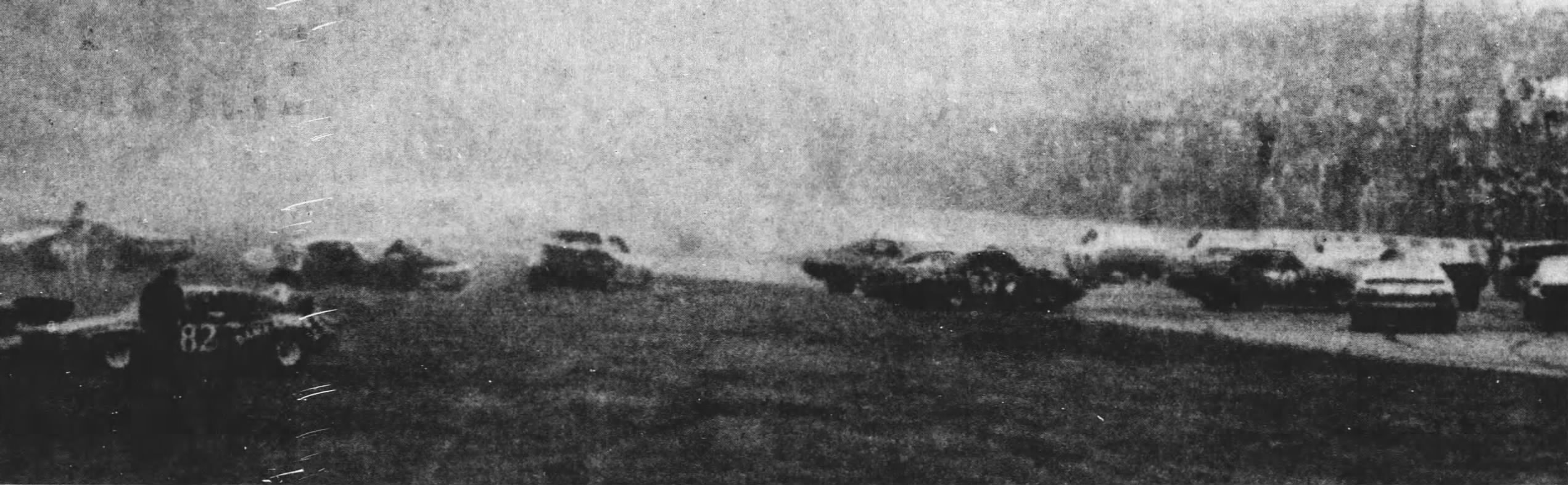
The aftermath of "The Big One"

On lap 9, Ramo Stott's engine let go, dumping oil onto the speedway's asphalt. Wendell Scott, behind him, spun out, and both cars skidded into Talladega's infield, creating a massive cloud of dirt and dust. The combination of oil on the track and suddenly limited visibility caused a massive pileup. 23 cars were involved.

One contemporary recorded film account called it "The worst accident in NASCAR history", in terms of the number of cars involved.

All drivers were able to leave their cars under their own power. Buddy Baker and Cale Yarborough were eliminated, and when they got out of their cars they had to dodge additional cars crashing around them. Some drivers did have injuries. Several received lacerations; Earl Brooks had a broken hand, Joe Frasson had shoulder injuries, and Slick Gardner suffered a knee injury. Wendell Scott, who was covered in blood everywhere on his body, would suffer the worst injuries: a fractured left leg, fractured pelvis in numerous places, broke three ribs, ripped most of the skin from his left forearm, and would seriously injure his right kidney. His arm bone was also visible and poking out, according to Frank Scott, Wendell's son. The crash would ultimately lead to Scott's retirement.

Bobby Allison, one of the drivers eliminated in the lap 9/10 wreck, later ripped the track's management for the field size of 60 set by track management - "They (filled the field) all right, all over the backstretch." Joe Frasson, already bloodied said "I hope to hell France is happy. NASCAR had no business starting 60 cars."

Cleanup from the wreck proceeded under 37 laps of a yellow flag, lasting one hour and five minutes. 19 cars were eliminated outright. A few others, including that of Richard Petty, were repaired and eventually ran more laps.

David Pearson lost the lead draft and Buddy Baker said that Pearson fouled out the spark plugs on his Mercury and then got them replaced under the lengthy yellow.

=== After the wreck ===
On lap 73, the engine of D. K. Ulrich's car dumped oil onto the track and caused another caution. Before this caution was over, Darrell Waltrip's car was retired due to a blown piston.

Pearson's number 21 car had little competition after the large lap 9 accident. He stretched out a very wide lead by the end of the race.

On lap 185, Vic Parsons' engine failed, and his car slipped in the dumped oil, causing a crash, with the race ending under yellow. Pearson was the only car on the lead lap at the end of the 500 miles.

=== Race results ===
Cautions: 4 for 54 laps

Margin of victory: 1 lap +

Lead changes: 13

Pos	Grid	No.	Driver	Team	Manufacturer	Laps	Status	Points
1	2	21	(United States) David Pearson	Wood Brothers Racing	Mercury	188	3:47:23	360
2	17	08	(United States) Donnie Allison	DiGard Motorsports	Chevrolet	187	+1 lap	331.75
3	20	72	(United States) Benny Parsons	DeWitt Racing	Chevrolet	187	+1 lap	329.75
4	12	61	(United States) Clarence Lovell	B & B Racing	Chevrolet	185	+3 laps	325.25
5	19	24	(United States) Cecil Gordon	R. W. Hill & Sons	Chevrolet	184	+4 laps	322
6	18	14	(United States) Coo Coo Marlin	H. B. Cunningham	Chevrolet	183	+5 laps	318.75
7	52	5	(United States) Dick Simon	Faustina Racing	Dodge	182	+6 laps	315.5
8	16	31	(United States) Jim Vandiver	O. L. Nixon Racing	Dodge	182	+6 laps	313.5
9	33	45	(Canada) Vic Parsons	Siefert Racing	Mercury	180	Crash	309
10	30	09	(United States) Charles Barrett	Elliott Racing	Ford	180	+8 laps	307
11	29	8	(United States) Ed Negre	Negre Racing	Dodge	176	+12 laps	300
12	24	0	(United States) Eddie Bond	Bond Racing	Dodge	175	+13 laps	296.75
13	38	03	(United States) Tommy Gale	Gale Racing	Mercury	172	+16 laps	291
14	46	52	(Canada) Earl Ross	Brooke Racing	Chevrolet	167	Ignition	282.75
15	51	25	(United States) Jabe Thomas	Robertson Racing	Dodge	167	+21 laps	280.75
16	41	7	(United States) Dean Dalton	Dalton Racing	Mercury	163	+25 laps	273.75
17	49	2	(United States) Dave Marcis	Marcis Racing	Dodge	152	+36 laps	258
18	31	70	(United States) J. D. McDuffie	McDuffie Racing	Chevrolet	147	Oil pan	249.75
19	37	64	(United States) Elmo Langley	Langley Racing	Ford	142	+46 laps	241.5
20	47	4	(United States) John Sears	J. Marvin Mills Racing	Dodge	141	+47 laps	238.25
21	56	35	(United States) Dick May	Walter Ballard Racing	Mercury	139	Engine	233.75
22	25	96	(United States) Richard Childress	Garn Racing	Chevrolet	109	Engine	194.25
23	48	22	(United States) Dick Brooks	Crawford (Brothers) Racing	Plymouth	107	Rear end	189.75
24	32	79	(United States) Frank Warren	Warren Racing	Dodge	107	Engine	187.75
25	14	83	(United States) Paul Tyler	Reed Racing	Mercury	90	Engine	164.5
26	7	15	(United States) Bobby Isaac	Moore Racing	Ford	89	Engine	161.25
27	39	89	(United States) Johnny Barnes	Hopper-Crews Racing	Mercury	89	Engine	159.25
28	44	47	(United States) Raymond Williams	Williams Racing	Ford	84	Engine	151
29	43	98	(United States) Mel Larson	Larson Racing	Chevrolet	84	Overheating	149
30	40	38	(United States) Tony Bettenhausen Jr.	Van Liew Racing	Chevrolet	79	Windshield	140.75
31	8	95	(United States) Darrell Waltrip	Waltrip Racing	Mercury	77	Oil leak	136.25
32	15	97	(United States) Red Farmer	Humphries Racing	Ford	76	Engine	133
33	42	40	(United States) D. K. Ulrich	Ulrich Racing	Ford	73	Engine	127.25
34	50	19	(United States) Henley Gray	Gray Racing	Mercury	68	Clutch	119
35	3	43	(United States) Richard Petty	Petty Enterprises	Dodge	51	Crash	95.75
36	27	05	(United States) David Sisco	Sisco Racing	Chevrolet	49	Engine	91.25
37	26	10	(United States) Bill Champion	Champion Racing	Mercury	32	Engine	68
38	6	28	(United States) Gordon Johncock	Ellington Racing	Chevrolet	23	Crash	54.75
39	54	3	(United States) Alton Jones	Hawkersmith Racing	Chevrolet	14	No tires	41.5
40	1	71	(United States) Buddy Baker	Krauskopf Racing	Dodge	10	Crash	34.5
41	4	11	(United States) Cale Yarborough	Howard Racing	Chevrolet	10	Crash	32.5
42	5	12	(United States) Bobby Allison	Allison Racing	Chevrolet	10	Crash	30.5
43	9	18	(United States) Joe Frasson	Frasson Racing	Dodge	10	Crash	28.5
44	13	90	(United States) Ramo Stott	Donlavey Racing	Mercury	9	Engine	25.25
45	34	48	(United States) James Hylton	James Hylton Motorsports	Mercury	9	Crash	23.25
46	23	54	(United States) Lennie Pond	Elder Racing	Chevrolet	9	Crash	21.25
47	11	75	(United States) Slick Gardner	Gardner Racing	Mercury	9	Crash	19.25
48	35	30	(United States) Walter Ballard	Vic Ballard Racing	Mercury	9	Crash	17.25
49	21	67	(United States) Buddy Arrington	Arrington Racing	Plymouth	9	Crash	15.25
50	22	88	(United States) Ron Keselowski	Lubinski Racing	Dodge	9	Crash	13.25
51	10	82	(United States) Bill Ward	Bennett Racing	Chevrolet	9	Crash	11.25
52	53	76	(United States) Ben Arnold	Arnold Racing	Mercury	9	Crash	11.25
53	59	77	(United States) Charlie Roberts	Roberts Racing	Ford	9	Crash	11.25
54	60	53	(United States) Bobby Mausgrover	Hopper-Crews Racing	Ford	9	Crash	11.25
55	58	34	(United States) Wendell Scott	Scott Racing	Mercury	8	Crash	10
56	55	26	(United States) Earl Brooks	Brooks Racing	Ford	8	Crash	10
57	57	85	(United States) Ronnie Daniel	Daniel Racing	Chevrolet	8	Crash	10
58	36	92	(United States) Larry Smith	Carling (Black Label) Racing	Mercury	8	Crash	10
59	28	6	(United States) Eddie Yarboro	Yarboro Racing	Dodge	4	Vibration	5
60	45	44	(United States) Richard D. Brown	Brown Racing	Chevrolet	1	Windshield	1.25
DNQ	-	1	(United States) Neil Bonnett	Krauskopf Racing	Dodge	-		
DNQ	-	49	(United States) John Utsman	Spencer Racing	Dodge	-		
DNQ	-	84	(United States) Bob Davis	Davis Racing	Dodge	-		

Preceded by 1973 Virginia 500	NASCAR Winston Cup Season; 1973	Succeeded by 1973 Music City USA 420
Preceded by 1972 Winston 500	Talladega spring race 1973	Succeeded by 1974 Winston 500
