= 1973 Talladega 500 =

Auto race at Talladega in 1973

Race details
- Race 20 of 28 in the 1973 NASCAR Winston Cup Series
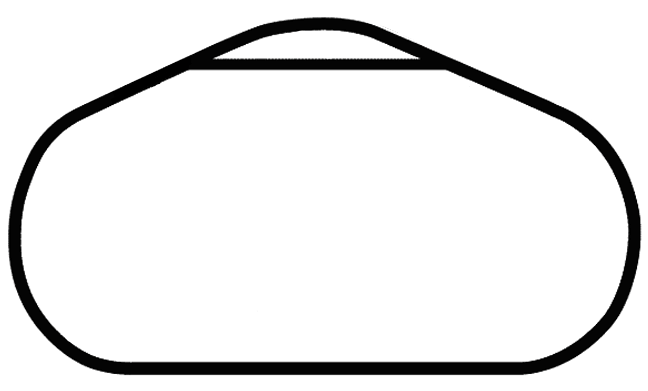
- Layout of Talladega Superspeedway
- Date: August 12, 1973
- Official name: Talladega 500
- Location: Alabama International Motor Speedway, Talladega, Alabama
- Course: Permanent racing facility
- Course length: 2.660 miles (4.281 km)
- Distance: 188 laps, 500.08 mi (804.801 km)
- Weather: Extremely hot with temperatures of 95.0 °F (35.0 °C); wind speeds up to 4.2 miles per hour (6.8 km/h)
- Average speed: 145.454 miles per hour (234.086 km/h)
- Attendance: 56,000

Pole position
| Driver | Bobby Allison | Allison Racing |

Most laps led
| Driver | David Pearson | Wood Brothers Racing |
- Laps: 40

Winner
| No. 22 | Dick Brooks | Crawford (Brothers) Racing |

Radio in the United States
- Radio: MRN
- Booth announcers: Ken Squier
- Turn announcers: Jim Fife, Tracy Dent, Barney Hall

The 1973 Talladega 500 was a NASCAR Winston Cup Series race that was held on August 12, 1973, at Alabama International Motor Speedway (AIMS) in Talladega, Alabama.

The race, won by Dick Brooks, was his only NASCAR career win. It was also the last win recorded for Plymouth as a NASCAR manufacturer. A Plymouth car winning the 1973 Talladega 500 was considered an upset.

The race set AIMS racetrack records (at the time of the race) for number of drivers leading in a race (15), number of lead changes in a race (64), and number of caution laps in a race (52). It also was the first race at the track in which a driver was fatally injured (Larry Smith).

== Legend ==
This race is also remembered for Bobby Isaac retiring in the middle of the race, after the fatal accident of Larry Smith, because he stated "something told" him to quit. Media accounts at the time claimed he stated heard a voice telling him to get out of the car immediately or he would die. Talladega Super Speedway is rumored to be "haunted" due to the rumor that Talladega was built on top of a Native American burial ground. As soon as he got to a telephone after climbing from the car, he called his wife and told her about it. He said that everything got very quiet in the car. There was no wind noise or engine noise. He then heard a voice tell him to get out of the car and he did without hesitation. He did return to racing later in his life, in 1977, racing on short tracks.

== Summary ==
=== Larry Smith fatal crash ===
On lap 13 of the race, the No. 92 car of Larry Smith (Carling Black Label Racing) struck the outside retaining wall of turn 1 at (by radio broadcast estimates) approximately 180 miles per hour (290 kilometres per hour).

Smith was described on the radio broadcast as "(the car) coasting to a stop", and one commentator described the car being "driven down to the inside of turn number two" where the car was parked and track safety crews waited to meet it.

Two different commentators were under the initial belief that Smith had driven the car from the outside wall to the safety apron under his own power, and that the damage from the hit was sufficient to take him out of the race. Damage to the car was described as the right front wheel having been sheared off, and the front end significantly damaged, with the windshield smashed out and glass on the track.

A preliminary report, given during lap 18, indicates that Smith "may have been injured". The caution put in place by Smith's crash was released on lap 27, after Smith's car was towed away and windshield glass from the car was cleared from the track.

By the end of the caution period, Smith's crash was described as a hard hit, with heavy damage to his car. Smith was taken by ambulance to the track's hospital on a stretcher, and further reports were awaited.

Larry Smith's death was confirmed to the race's radio broadcast audience at lap 51. He was described as having been dead on arrival to the track's hospital, after the hit his car took on turn 1 of the track. Smith's death was the first race fatality at Alabama International Motor Speedway.

Track officials indicated that the headrest of Smith's car had been broken by the wall impact, and that he had died of massive head injuries. It was further reported that he had been running his car on a cut tire for two laps prior to the crash, with only the safety inner liner of the tire keeping the car rolling.

=== Lap 174 ===
As a three way fight for the win between Dick Brooks, Buddy Baker, and David Pearson was in progress, Baker's car suddenly began smoking heavily. This was assumed to be a blown engine, and it brought out a caution. Baker circled to the pits and briefly stopped, to have a hole in his oil filter repaired, by having the filter replaced. Baker did not fall off the lead lap; at this point, only Brooks, Baker, and Pearson's cars remained on the lead lap.

=== Lap 180 and finish ===
The race resumed under green on lap 180, with Brooks and Pearson battling for the lead. Pearson's car appeared to be lagging as of the restart, and he quickly fell back behind lapped cars to be passed by a still-smoking Buddy Baker car for second position.

Dick Brooks took the checkered flag for the win, with Buddy Baker keeping his heavily smoking car going to finish second. Pearson's pit crew reported that his car was 'missing badly', and he finished third on the lead lap, with a partially disabled engine.

== Race results ==
David Pearson's third-place finish was sufficient to make him the second NASCAR driver to reach the $1,000,000 purse earnings mark. The first to do this was Richard Petty.

| Pos | Grid | No. | Driver | Team | Manufacturer | Laps | Status | Points |
|---|---|---|---|---|---|---|---|---|
| 1 | 24 | 22 | Dick Brooks | Crawford (Brothers) Racing | Plymouth | 188 | 3:26:17 | 360 |
| 2 | 21 | 71 | Buddy Baker | Krauskopf Racing | Dodge | 188 | +7.2 sec | 333 |
| 3 | 2 | 21 | David Pearson | Wood Brothers Racing | Mercury | 188 | lead lap | 331 |
| 4 | 25 | 48 | James Hylton | James Hylton Motorsports | Mercury | 186 | +2 laps | 326.5 |
| 5 | 13 | 05 | David Sisco | Sisco Racing | Chevrolet | 186 | +2 laps | 324.5 |
| 6 | 7 | 11 | Cale Yarborough | Howard Racing | Chevrolet | 185 | +3 laps | 321.25 |
| 7 | 27 | 95 | Darrell Waltrip | Waltrip Racing | Mercury | 184 | +4 laps | 318 |
| 8 | 9 | 24 | Cecil Gordon | Gordon Racing | Mercury | 184 | +4 laps | 316 |
| 9 | 17 | 30 | Walter Ballard | Vic Ballard Racing | Mercury | 184 | +4 laps | 314 |
| 10 | 26 | 02 | L. D. Ottinger | Bryant Racing | Chevrolet | 183 | +5 laps | 310.75 |
| 11 | 23 | 70 | J. D. McDuffie | McDuffie Racing | Chevrolet | 183 | +5 laps | 308.75 |
| 12 | 33 | 2 | Dave Marcis | Marcis Racing | Dodge | 183 | +5 laps | 306.75 |
| 13 | 4 | 15 | Bobby Isaac | Moore Racing | Ford | 182 | +6 laps | 303.5 |
| 14 | 3 | 43 | Richard Petty | Petty Enterprises | Dodge | 181 | +7 laps | 300.25 |
| 15 | 12 | 79 | Frank Warren | Warren Racing | Dodge | 181 | +7 laps | 298.25 |
| 16 | 37 | 25 | Jabe Thomas | Robertson Racing | Dodge | 180 | +8 laps | 295 |
| 17 | 46 | 7 | Dean Dalton | Dalton Racing | Chevrolet | 180 | +8 laps | 293 |
| 18 | 18 | 82 | Bill Ward | Bennett Racing | Chevrolet | 179 | +9 laps | 289.75 |
| 19 | 34 | 68 | Alton Jones | Hawkersmith Racing | Chevrolet | 178 | +10 laps | 286.5 |
| 20 | 38 | 74 | Randy Tissot | Tissot Racing | Chevrolet | 176 | +12 laps | 282 |
| 21 | 30 | 64 | Elmo Langley | Langley Racing | Ford | 175 | +13 laps | 278.85 |
| 22 | 40 | 10 | Bill Champion | Champion Racing | Mercury | 175 | +13 laps | 276.75 |
| 23 | 44 | 0 | Eddie Bond | Bond Racing | Dodge | 171 | +17 laps | 269.75 |
| 24 | 45 | 00 | Bobby Mausgrover | Mausgrover Racing | Chevrolet | 167 | +21 laps | 262.75 |
| 25 | 42 | 8 | Ed Negre | Negre Racing | Dodge | 166 | +22 laps | 259.5 |
| 26 | 5 | 88 | Donnie Allison | DiGard Motorsports | Chevrolet | 157 | Engine | 246.25 |
| 27 | 20 | 67 | Buddy Arrington | Arrington Racing | Plymouth | 156 | Engine | 243 |
| 28 | 47 | 19 | Henley Gray | Gray Racing | Mercury | 156 | +32 laps | 241 |
| 29 | 1 | 12 | Bobby Allison | Allison Racing | Chevrolet | 155 | Crash | 237.75 |
| 30 | 31 | 89 | Johnny Barnes | Hopper-Crews Racing | Mercury | 115 | Rear end | 185.75 |
| 31 | 14 | 96 | Richard Childress | Garn Racing | Chevrolet | 111 | Throttle | 178.75 |
| 32 | 19 | 97 | Red Farmer | Humphries Racing | Ford | 106 | Engine | 170.5 |
| 33 | 11 | 61 | Ed Sczech | Bierschwale Racing | Chevrolet | 94 | Oil pump | 153.5 |
| 34 | 41 | 84 | Bob Davis | Davis Racing | Dodge | 93 | Ignition | 150.25 |
| 35 | 39 | 4 | Jim Vandiver | Sears Racing | Dodge | 88 | Engine | 142 |
| 36 | 10 | 42 | Marty Robbins | Robbins Racing | Dodge | 80 | Ignition | 130 |
| 37 | 28 | 90 | Jody Ridley | Donlavey Racing | Mercury | 77 | Transmission | 124.25 |
| 38 | 6 | 72 | Benny Parsons | DeWitt Racing | Chevrolet | 74 | Engine | 118.5 |
| 39 | 48 | 40 | D. K. Ulrich | Ulrich Racing | Ford | 65 | Ignition | 105.25 |
| 40 | 22 | 14 | Coo Coo Marlin | H. B. Cunningham | Chevrolet | 58 | Engine | 94.5 |
| 41 | 43 | 80 | Phil Finney | Finney Racing | Chevrolet | 55 | Oil leak | 88.75 |
| 42 | 49 | 77 | Charlie Roberts | Roberts Racing | Ford | 52 | Engine | 83 |
| 43 | 15 | 18 | Joe Frasson | Frasson Racing | Dodge | 51 | Engine | 79.75 |
| 44 | 36 | 73 | Mel Larson | Larson Racing | Dodge | 51 | Oil leak | 77.75 |
| 45 | 8 | 28 | Ramo Stott | Ellington Racing | Chevrolet | 46 | Transmission | 69.5 |
| 46 | 50 | 47 | Raymond Williams | Williams Racing | Ford | 33 | Engine | 51.25 |
| 47 | 32 | 54 | Lennie Pond | Elder Racing | Chevrolet | 32 | Engine | 48 |
| 48 | 29 | 03 | Tommy Gale | Gale Racing | Mercury | 18 | Ignition | 28.5 |
| 49 | 35 | 92 | Larry Smith ✝ | Carling (Black Label) Racing | Mercury | 13 | Fatal crash | 20.25 |
| 50 | 16 | 83 | Paul Tyler | Reed Racing | Mercury | 10 | Ignition | 14.5 |
| WD | 39* | | Richard Brown | | Chevrolet | | Engine | |
| WD | 50* | | Ron Keselowski | | Dodge | | Not competitive | |
| DNQ | - | | Neil Bonnett | | | | | |

* Qualifying position of the driver before withdrawing

✝ Driver was fatally injured

== Aftermath ==
Plymouth (which had not won a NASCAR race in all of 1973) taking a win was considered a shock by contemporaries and by racing fans. While all cars on track at Talladega had to use restrictor plates (the Crawford Brothers Racing No. 22 included), it was revealed years later by team co-owner Jimmy Crawford that there was a mechanical reason for the Plymouth's unusual speed and power. His brother, Peter Crawford, designed an induction system to maximize airflow to the car's engine despite the mandatory restrictor plate.

Peter Crawford's mechanical work resulted in a custom intake manifold which fit the rule specifications for 1973 parts, and was approved by NASCAR for the race as long as similar manifolds were made available to other participating Plymouth teams. Privately, testing performed by the team demonstrated that the Peter Crawford's intake manifold allowed their engine to produce in excess of 600 horsepower even with the restrictor plate installed.

After the race and the runaway result from the Plymouth, AIMS track owner and then-NASCAR president Bill France Sr. called a meeting with the brothers.

The brothers were informed that Peter's intake manifold design was being outlawed according to the rule stating that "All parts must be NASCAR approved"; simply put, NASCAR was revoking their earlier approval to use it because of its raw effectiveness and the imbalance it introduced.

| Preceded by 1973 Dixie 500 | NASCAR Winston Cup Season; 1973 | Succeeded by 1973 Nashville 420 |
| Preceded by 1972 | Talladega 500 races 1973 | Succeeded by 1974 |
