= 1973 Dixie 500 =

Auto race held at Atlanta International Speedway in 1973

Race details
- Race 19 of 28 in the 1973 NASCAR Winston Cup Series
- Layout of Atlanta International Speedway, used until 1996
- Date: July 22, 1973
- Official name: Dixie 500
- Course: Permanent racing facility
- Course length: 1.522 miles (2.449 km)
- Distance: 328 laps, 499.2 mi (803.3 km)
- Weather: Temperatures of 90 °F (32 °C); wind speeds of 8 miles per hour (13 km/h)
- Average speed: 130.211 miles per hour (209.554 km/h)
- Attendance: 30,000

Pole position
Driver	Richard Petty	Petty Enterprises

Most laps led
Driver	David Pearson	Wood Brothers
- Laps: 178

Winner
No. 21	David Pearson	Wood Brothers

The 1973 Dixie 500 was a NASCAR Winston Cup Series race that took place on July 22, 1973, at Atlanta International Raceway in Hampton, Georgia.

== Background ==
Atlanta International Raceway (now Atlanta Motor Speedway) is one of ten current intermediate tracks to hold NASCAR races. The layout at Atlanta International Speedway at the time was a four-turn traditional oval track that is 1.54 miles (2.48 km) long. The track's turns are banked at twenty-four degrees, while the front stretch, the location of the finish line, and the back stretch are banked at five.

== Race report ==
It took three hours and fifty minutes for David Pearson to defeat Cale Yarborough by more than one lap. Pearson would take home $16,650 in prize money ($120,756.18 when adjusted for inflation) while last-place finisher Charles Barrett would receive $880 ($6,382.31 when adjusted for inflation).

Though running a limited schedule, this was David Pearson's ninth win in the last ten races that he and the Wood Brothers entered, with a second in the other race. In the NASCAR Cup Series after 1972, nobody has ever matched this.

Jabe Thomas, finished 9th in a 40 car field. He had higher finishes but many were at small tracks no longer used after 1971.

Fourteen lead changes were exchanged among six drivers (Richard Petty, Bobby Allison, Bobby Isaac, Cale Yarborough, Donnie Allison, and David Pearson). Six cautions lasted 47 laps and the average speed of the race was 130.211 miles per hour or 209.554 kilometres per hour. Thirty-thousand people would see a racing grid of 39 American drivers and one Canadian driver (Vic Parsons). Richard Petty would win the pole position with a speed of 157.163 miles per hour or 252.929 kilometres per hour.

=== Qualifying ===
Grid	No.	Driver	Manufacturer	Speed	Time	Owner
1	43	Richard Petty	'73 Dodge	157.163	34.863	Petty Enterprises
2	12	Bobby Allison	'73 Chevrolet	157.046	34.889	Bobby Allison
3	11	Cale Yarborough	'73 Chevrolet	156.369	35.040	Richard Howard
4	15	Bobby Isaac	'72 Ford	156.075	35.106	Bud Moore
5	21	David Pearson	'71 Mercury	155.007	35.348	Wood Brothers
6	24	Cecil Gordon	'72 Chevrolet	153.905	35.601	Cecil Gordon
7	88	Donnie Allison	'73 Chevrolet	153.388	35.721	DiGard
8	7	Dean Dalton	'71 Mercury	151.748	36.107	Dean Dalton
9	14	Coo Coo Marlin	'72 Chevrolet	151.610	36.140	H.B. Cunningham
10	70	J.D. McDuffie	'72 Chevrolet	151.012	36.283	J.D. McDuffie

Failed to qualify: Phil Finney (#80), Richard D. Brown (#44)

== Finishing order ==
1. David Pearson† (No. 21)
2. Cale Yarborough†(No. 11)
3. Donnie Allison (No. 88)
4. Joe Frasson† (No. 18)
5. Jody Ridley (No. 90)
6. Lennie Pond† (No. 54)
7. J.D. McDuffie† (No. 70)
8. G.C. Spencer† (No. 49)
9. Jabe Thomas† (No. 25)
10. Larry Smith† (No. 92)
11. Buddy Arrington (No. 67)
12. Rick Newsom† (No. 20)
13. Henley Gray (No. 19)
14. Frank Warren (No. 79)
15. Walter Ballard (No. 30)
16. Randy Tissot (No. 32)
17. Bill Champion† (No. 10)
18. Ed Negre† (No. 8)
19. Charlie Roberts (No. 77)
20. Raymond Williams (No. 47)
21. James Hylton† (No. 48)
22. Dean Dalton (No. 7)
23. Richard Childress (No. 96)
24. Cecil Gordon*† (No. 24)
25. Benny Parsons*† (No. 72)
26. David Sisco*† (No. 05)
27. Bobby Allison* (No. 12)
28. Ed Sczech* (No. 61)
29. Vic Parsons* (No. 45)
30. Coo Coo Marlin*† (No. 14)
31. Darrell Waltrip* (No. 95)
32. Dave Marcis* (No. 2)
33. Richard Petty* (No. 43)
34. Buddy Baker*† (No. 71)
35. Bobby Isaac*† (No. 15)
36. John Sears*† (No. 4)
37. Tommy Gale*† (No. 03)
38. Elmo Langley*† (No. 64)
39. H.B. Bailey*† (No. 39)
40. Charles Barrett* (No. 09)

* Driver failed to finish race
† signifies that the driver is known to be deceased

== Timeline ==
Section reference:

- Start of race: Bobby Allison was ahead of the other drivers as the green flag was waved.
- Lap 3: Bobby Isaac took over the lead from Bobby Allison; Charles Barrett's vehicle developed engine issues.
- Lap 7: H. B. Bailey's vehicle developed a problematic engine.
- Lap 32: Cale Yarborough took over the lead from Bobby Isaac.
- Lap 39: A faulty engine managed to end Tommy Gale's day on the track.
- Lap 40: Bobby Allison took over the lead from Cale Yarborough.
- Lap 42: David Pearson took over the lead from Bobby Allison.
- Lap 43: Donnie Allison took over the lead from David Pearson.
- Lap 45: Cale Yarborough took over the lead from Donnie Allison; John Sears' vehicle developed a troublesome engine.
- Lap 52: Bobby Isaac had a terminal crash.
- Lap 56: David Pearson took over the lead from Cale Yarborough.
- Lap 58: Bobby Allison took over the lead from David Pearson.
- Lap 61: David Pearson took over the lead from Bobby Allison.
- Lap 65: Axle issues brought Buddy Baker's race to an early end.
- Lap 71: Cale Yarborough took over the lead from David Pearson.
- Lap 72: Engine issues dethroned Richard Petty for the day, making him accept a 33rd-place finish.
- Lap 91: Lug bolt issues ended Dave Marcis' day on the track.
- Lap 110: Engine issues knocked out Darrell Waltrip from the race.
- Lap 124: Donnie Allison took over the lead from Cale Yarborough.
- Lap 125: Cale Yarborough took over the lead from Donnie Allison.
- Lap 152: Coo Coo Marlin would end the day once his vehicle's engine stopped working.
- Lap 157: Vic Parsons' dodgy transmission managed to bring him out of the race.
- Lap 164: David Pearson took over the lead from Cale Yarborough.
- Lap 169: Ed Sczech's faulty engine managed to render his chance of finishing the race non-existent.
- Lap 205: Bobby Allison would fail to finish the race due to an awful engine.
- Lap 240: David Sisco's engine stopped working in a timely manner.
- Lap 248: Benny Parsons noticed that his vehicle had a troublesome oil pump.
- Lap 262: Cecil Gordon's engine problem would make him the final DNF of the event.
- Finish: David Pearson was officially declared the winner of the event.

Preceded by 1973 Volunteer 500	NASCAR Winston Cup Series Season; 1973	Succeeded by 1973 Talladega 500

Preceded by 1972	Dixie 500 races 1973	Succeeded by 1974
