= Mel Larson =

American racing driver (1929–2016)

- Born: October 1, 1929; Plymouth, Michigan, U.S.
- Died: November 1, 2016 (aged 87); Las Vegas, Nevada, U.S.
- Awards: West Coast Stock Car Hall of Fame (2010)

NASCAR Cup Series career
- 47 races run over 11 years
- Best finish: 38th (1973)
- First race: 1955 Race 13 (Arizona)
- Last race: 1978 Los Angeles Times 500 (Ontario)
Wins	Top tens	Poles
0	14	2

NASCAR Convertible Division career
- 46 races run over 2 years
- Best finish: 9th (1956)
- First race: 1956 Race 1 (Daytona)
- Last race: 1957 Race 2 (Jacksonville)
Wins	Top tens	Poles
0	3	1

ARCA Menards Series career
- 3 races run over 1 year
- First race: 1957 Race 12 (16th Street)
- Last race: 1957 Race 19 (Northville)
Wins	Top tens	Poles
0	1	0

ARCA Menards Series West career
- 17 races run over 10 years
- Best finish: 9th (1959)
- First race: 1955 Race 14 (Lancaster)
- Last race: 1983 Coors 200 (Caesars Palace)
Wins	Top tens	Poles
0	10	0
- Statistics up to date as of August 31, 2026.

Mel Larson (October 1, 1929 – November 1, 2016) was an American professional stock car racing driver. He was a driver in the NASCAR Winston Cup Series from 1955 to 1978. He was not related to Kyle Larson.

Larson died on November 1, 2016, in Las Vegas, Nevada at age 87.
