= 1973 Capital City 500 =

Auto race held at Richmond Raceway in 1973

Race details
- Race 23 of 28 in the 1973 NASCAR Winston Cup Series
- Layout of Richmond Speedway
- Date: September 9, 1973
- Official name: Capital City 500
- Location: Richmond Fairgrounds Raceway, Richmond, Virginia
- Course length: 0.872 km (0.542 miles)
- Distance: 500 laps, 271 mi (436 km)
- Weather: Temperatures reaching of 82 °F (28 °C); wind speeds of 7 miles per hour (11 km/h)
- Average speed: 63.215 miles per hour (101.735 km/h)
- Attendance: 18,000

Pole position
Driver	Bobby Allison	Bobby Allison Motorsports

Most laps led
Driver	Richard Petty	Petty Enterprises
- Laps: 429

Winner
No. 43	Richard Petty	Petty Enterprises

The 1973 Capital City 500 was a NASCAR Winston Cup Series race that took place on September 9, 1973, at Richmond Fairgrounds Raceway (now Richmond Raceway) in Richmond, Virginia. Richard Petty won the race by two laps after leading 429 of 500 laps.

== Race report ==
Richard Petty defeated Cale Yarborough by at least two laps in front of 18000 spectators; five of which were by at least one lap. After running second to Bobby Allison in the spring 1974 race, he won again in the fall 1974 and spring 1975 races, the latter by six laps. It took four hours and thirteen minutes to finish the 500-lap race with the track spanning exactly 0.542 miles (0.872 km). Petty had won six other races at this track before extending his lucky streak to 7 at the end of this event.

Bobby Allison acquired the pole position with a qualifying speed of 90.245 miles per hour (145.235 km/h). The average race speed was 63.215 miles per hour (101.735 km/h). Five cautions slowed the race for 123 laps. Baxter Price finished in last-place due to a crash that also took out nine other cars at the start of lap 4. Out of the 34 races on the grid, 33 were born in the United States while Vic Parsons was born in Canada. J.D. McDuffie, Richard Childress and Darrell Waltrip also participated in this race.

Nearly a quarter of the race was run under the yellow flag despite the fact that there were only five caution periods during the race. There were threatening skies from the green flag; causing most of the race to be done under the yellow flag. No attempt was made to postpone the race or to call it "official." A record amount of 86 laps were done under caution until the skies became blue again. Besides the weather, a red flag also held up the race for 70 minutes as Price and Bill Champion, who was also involved in a fiery crash had to go to the hospital for their respective injuries.

Post-race coverage was done by the local newspaper The Daily Times-News from Burlington, North Carolina.

=== Qualifying ===
Grid	No.	Driver	Manufacturer	Owner
1	12	Bobby Allison	'73 Chevrolet	Bobby Allison
2	15	Darrell Waltrip	'73 Ford	Bud Moore
3	11	Cale Yarborough	'73 Chevrolet	Richard Howard
4	71	Buddy Baker	'73 Dodge	Nord Krauskopf
5	43	Richard Petty	'73 Dodge	Petty Enterprises
6	30	Walter Ballard	'71 Mercury	Vic Ballard
7	72	Benny Parsons	'73 Chevrolet	L.G. DeWitt
8	7	Dean Dalton	'71 Mercury	Dean Dalton
9	05	David Sisco	'72 Chevrolet	Charlie McGee
10	90	Dick Brooks	'71 Mercury	Junie Donlavey

== Top 10 finishers ==
Pos	Grid	No.	Driver	Manufacturer	Money	Laps	Laps led	Time/Status
1	5	43	Richard Petty	'73 Dodge	$6,775	500	429	4:13:17
2	3	11	Cale Yarborough	'73 Chevrolet	$4,425	498	17	+2 laps
3	1	12	Bobby Allison	'73 Chevrolet	$4,150	497	54	+3 laps
4	7	72	Benny Parsons	'73 Chevrolet	$1,750	492	0	+8 laps
5	20	67	Buddy Arrington	'72 Dodge	$1,580	482	0	+18 laps
6	6	30	Walter Ballard	'71 Mercury	$1,250	477	0	+23 laps
7	11	24	Cecil Gordon	'72 Chevrolet	$1,210	477	0	+23 laps
8	14	18	James Hylton	'71 Mercury	$1,300	476	0	+24 laps
9	16	19	Henley Gray	'71 Mercury	$1,225	473	0	+27 laps
10	26	47	Raymond Williams	'72 Ford	$975	461	0	+39 laps

== Timeline ==
Section reference:

- Start of race: Bobby Allison had the pole position to start the event.
- Lap 3: Baxter Price became the last-place finisher of the race due with engine problems.
- Lap 13: D.K. Ulrich fell out with engine failure.
- Lap 33: Dick May lost the rear end of his racing vehicle.
- Lap 51: Richard Petty took over the lead from Bobby Allison.
- Lap 64: Bobby Allison took over the lead from Richard Petty.
- Lap 66: Cale Yarborough took over the lead from Bobby Allison; Ronnie Daniel transmission troubles.
- Lap 83: Richard Petty took over the lead from Cale Yarborough.
- Lap 114: Earl Brooks out after head gasket failed.
- Lap 175: Ed Negre's engine failed.
- Lap 179: Bobby Allison took over the lead from Richard Petty.
- Lap 181: Richard Petty took over the lead from Bobby Allison.
- Lap 203: John Sears engine overheated.
- Lap 305: Mel Larson's engine troubles.
- Lap 343: Jabe Thomas crashed, forcing him to exit the race prematurely.
- Lap 383: David Sisco crashed, forcing him to exit the race prematurely.
- Lap 411: Elmo Langley engine failed.
- Finish: Richard Petty was officially declared the winner of the event.

Preceded by 1973 Southern 500	Winston Cup Series races 1971–2004	Succeeded by 1973 Delaware 500

Preceded by 1973 Alamo 500	Richard Petty's Career Wins; 1960–1984	Succeeded by 1973 Old Dominion 500
