= 1973 Rebel 500 =

Auto race held at Darlington Raceway in 1973

Race details
- Race 8 of 28 in the 1973 NASCAR Winston Cup Series
- 1973 Rebel 500 program cover
- Date: April 15, 1973
- Official name: Rebel 500
- Location: Darlington Raceway (Darlington, South Carolina)
- Course: Permanent racing facility
- Course length: 1.366 miles (2.198 km)
- Distance: 367 laps, 501.3 mi (806.7 km)
- Weather: Temperatures of 68.9 °F (20.5 °C); wind speeds up to 10.9 miles per hour (17.5 km/h)
- Average speed: 122.655 mph (197.394 km/h)
- Attendance: 48,000

Pole position
Driver	David Pearson	Wood Brothers

Most laps led
Driver	David Pearson	Wood Brothers
- Laps: 246

Winner
No. 21	David Pearson	Wood Brothers

The 1973 Rebel 500 was a NASCAR Winston Cup Series race that took place on April 15, 1973, at Darlington Raceway in Darlington, South Carolina.

== Race report ==
Three hundred and sixty seven laps took place on the paved oval track spanning 1.366 miles (2.198 km) for a total of 501.3 miles (806.8 km). The total time of the race was four hours and four minutes. Speeds were: 122.655 miles per hour (197.394 km/h) for the average and 153.463 miles per hour (246.975 km/h) for the pole position. There were eleven cautions for seventy-one laps. David Pearson defeated Benny Parsons by thirteen laps in front of forty-eight thousand people.

Early in the race on lap 2, a 5 car accident happened in Turn 2. Buddy Arrington, Richie Panch, Dave Marcis, Lennie Pond, and Dean Dalton were involved. Marcis and Pond would eventually go on to retire due to crash related problems. Cale Yarborough would also suffer a spin early in the race. Paul Tyler and Bobby Issac would also spin in the race. James Hylton would smash into the wall, causing a caution. Charlie Roberts would also suffer engine failures, causing another caution. The 10th caution would come out with an accident including Cale Yarborough and G.C. Spencer. With Pearson leading the next restart, it only took one turn to turn Turn 1 into a "junkyard", with a 7 car crash, including Parsons, Petty, Arrington, Mayne, Brooks, and more involved, causing the 11th caution. Twelve cars finished this race out of the 40 starters.

This race stands as the second largest margin of victory in Cup history, falling just short of Ned Jarrett and his 14 lap differential in the 1965 Southern 500.

Notable crew chiefs for this race were Tim Brewer, Jake Elder, Travis Carter, Harry Hyde, Dale Inman, and Bud Moore.

== Qualifying ==
Grid	No.	Driver	Manufacturer
1	21	David Pearson	'71 Mercury
2	11	Cale Yarborough	'73 Chevrolet
3	12	Bobby Allison	'73 Chevrolet
4	15	Bobby Isaac	'72 Ford
5	71	Bobby Baker	'73 Dodge
6	72	Benny Parsons	'72 Chevrolet
7	24	Cecil Gordon	'72 Chevrolet
8	43	Richard Petty	'73 Dodge
9	28	Charlie Glotzbach	'72 Chevrolet
10	7	Dean Dalton	'71 Mercury
11	48	James Hylton	'71 Mercury
12	18	Joe Frasson	'73 Dodge
13	95	Darrell Waltrip	'71 Mercury
14	54	Lennie Pond	'73 Chevrolet
15	2	Dave Marcis	'71 Dodge
16	67	Buddy Arrington	'72 Dodge
17	90	Richie Panch	'71 Mercury
18	61	Clarence Lovell	'73 Chevrolet
19	25	Roy Mayne	'73 Dodge
20	83	Paul Tyler	'71 Mercury
21	96	Richard Childress	'73 Chevrolet
22	01	Earle Canavan	'72 Plymouth
23	45	Vic Parsons	'71 Ford
24	92	Larry Smith	'71 Mercury
25	98	Dick Brooks	'71 Ford
26	70	J.D. McDuffie	'72 Chevrolet
27	30	Walter Ballard	'71 Mercury
28	49	G.C. Spencer	'72 Dodge
29	79	David Ray Boggs	'73 Dodge
30	19	Jabe Thomas	'71 Mercury

== Finishing order ==
Section reference:

Fin	St	#	Driver	Sponsor	Make	Laps	Led	Status
1	1	21	David Pearson	Purolator Special	'71 Mercury	367	246	running
2	6	72	Benny Parsons	DeWitt Racing	'72 Chevrolet	354	12	running
3	3	12	Bobby Allison	Coca-Cola	'73 Chevrolet	349	96	engine
4	21	96	Richard Childress	L.C. Newton Trucking	'73 Chevrolet	346	0	running
5	26	70	J.D. McDuffie	McDuffie Racing	'72 Chevrolet	344	0	running
6	10	7	Dean Dalton	Belden Asphalt	'71 Mercury	341	0	running
7	8	43	Richard Petty	STP	'73 Dodge	340	4	crash
8	5	71	Buddy Baker	K & K Insurance	'73 Dodge	332	0	running
9	19	25	Roy Mayne	Clyde Lynn Inc.	'73 Dodge	331	0	running
10	33	47	Raymond Williams	Jet Way Wax	'72 Ford	330	0	running
11	25	98	Dick Brooks	Truxmore Industries	'71 Ford	328	0	crash
12	22	01	Earle Canavan	Kosin's Auto Parts	'72 Plymouth	326	0	running
13	16	67	Buddy Arrington	KFC Bacon Center Fries Special	'72 Dodge	324	0	crash
14	39	34	Wendell Scott	Scott Racing	'71 Ford	319	0	running
15	28	49	G.C. Spencer	Sheffield Auto Mart	'72 Dodge	317	0	crash
16	30	19	Jabe Thomas	Gray Racing	'71 Mercury	315	0	running
17	17	90	Richie Panch	Truxmore Industries	'71 Mercury	309	0	running
18	38	89	Johnny Barnes	Hopper-Crews	'71 Mercury	291	0	running
19	2	11	Cale Yarborough	Kar-Kare	'73 Chevrolet	275	0	engine
20	31	8	Ed Negre	Clyde Lynn's Inc.	'71 Mercury	256	0	oil line
21	7	24	Cecil Gordon	Cecil Gordon Racing	'72 Chevrolet	251	0	engine
22	35	4	John Sears	J. Marvin Mills Heating & Air	'71 Dodge	250	0	engine
23	11	48	James Hylton	Hylton Engineering	'71 Mercury	250	0	running
24	13	95	Darrell Waltrip	Terminal Transport	'71 Mercury	199	9	engine
25	27	30	Walter Ballard	Ballard Racing	'71 Mercury	178	0	engine
26	34	77	Charlie Roberts	Sunny King Ford	'71 Ford	170	0	engine
27	20	83	Paul Tyler	Smithville Farms	'71 Mercury	159	0	overheating
28	23	45	Vic Parsons	Seifert Rent-A-Racer	'71 Ford	150	0	overheating
29	29	79	David Ray Boggs	Winston 500	'73 Dodge	116	0	engine
30	18	61	Clarence Lovell	B & B Racing	'73 Chevrolet	95	0	engine
31	9	28	Charlie Glotzbach	Ellington Racing	'72 Chevrolet	86	0	engine
32	40	84	Frank Warren	Davis Racing	'71 Dodge	78	0	brakes
33	4	15	Bobby Isaac	Sta-Power Industries	'72 Ford	77	0	engine
34	12	18	Joe Frasson	Frasson Cement	'73 Dodge	67	0	engine
35	32	64	Elmo Langley	Langley Racing	'72 Ford	54	0	oil pan
36	14	54	Lennie Pond	Master Chevy Sales	'73 Chevrolet	39	0	crash
37	24	92	Larry Smith	Carling Black Label	'71 Mercury	23	0	overheating
38	36	26	Earl Brooks	Brooks Racing	'71 Ford	20	0	oil leak
39	37	10	Bill Champion	Champion Racing	'71 Mercury	18	0	engine
40	15	2	Dave Marcis	Marcis Racing	'71 Dodge	2	0	crash

Preceded by 1973 Gwyn Staley 400	NASCAR Winston Cup Series Season; 1973	Succeeded by 1973 Virginia 500
