= 1973 Winston Western 500 =

Auto race held at Riverside International Raceway in 1973

Race details
- Race 1 of 28 in the 1973 NASCAR Winston Cup Series
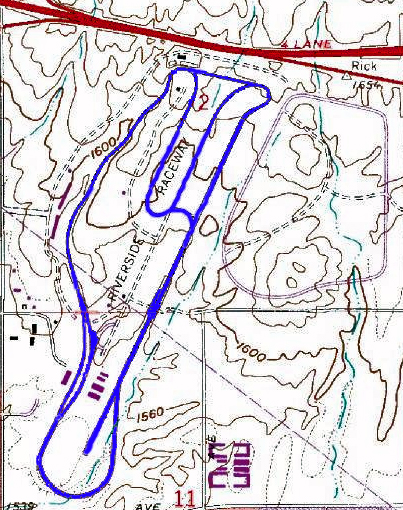
- Layout of Riverside International Raceway (1969-1988 version)
- Date: January 21, 1973
- Official name: Winston Western 500
- Location: Riverside International Raceway, Riverside, California
- Course: Permanent racing facility
- Course length: 2.620 miles (4.216 km)
- Distance: 153 laps, 400.9 mi (645.1 km)
- Average speed: 104.055 mph (167.460 km/h)
- Attendance: 51,000

Pole position
Driver	David Pearson	Wood Brothers Racing

Most laps led
Driver	Mark Donohue	Penske Racing
- Laps: 138

Winner
No. 16	Mark Donohue	Penske Racing

Radio in the United States
- Radio: MRN
- Booth announcers: Ken Squier, Marvin Panch
- Turn announcers: Bill Scott, Bob Steinbrink, Fritz Duda

The 1973 Winston Western 500 was a NASCAR Winston Cup Series racing event that was held on January 21, 1973, at Riverside International Raceway in Riverside, California. There were 191 laps; which was very hardcore at a road course for the early-1970s. The time of the race was almost 5 hours long; which made it the equivalent of 2.5 regulation-length Formula One races.

The race was won by Mark Donohue. It would be his only win of the season. It was AMC's first win in the Grand National/Winston Cup series as a manufacturer since April 1, 1951.

== Pre-race ==
Before race Sunday, there were concerns about the health of Bobby Allison (who had been ill with the flu). As the race began, a report from the pits stated that Allison was feeling 'much better' than he had been, and hoped to complete at least half the race (if not all of the race) on his own, without resorting to a relief driver in his brother, Donnie Allison.

== Race ==
For the first five years of his NASCAR career Cecil "Flash" Gordon was a stalwart FoMoCo racer but for 1973 he made the big switch to General Motors. This race marked the debut for his brand-new #24 Chevrolet and while he went out with transmission failure here Gordon would remain in the GM stable throughout almost all of his remaining NASCAR starts. He'd race Chevrolets exclusively for the next six seasons before he started running a variety of different cars from GM.

Mark Donohue drove an AMC Matador featured a set of disc brakes – new for NASCAR racing at the time – and led 138 laps en route to the win. David Pearson won the pole but never led and fell out with clutch failure, while Richard Petty started fifth and led 39 laps before his engine failed while leading on Lap 95. Bobby Allison finished second driving a self-fielded Chevrolet following a surprise divorce from the Richard Howard team. Cale Yarborough, new driver for Howard's team with the cars renumbered to #11, fell out with transmission failure.

Finishing a respectable 15th was Gerald Thompson in a '73 Pontiac Grand Am. Unfortunately after losing an engine in their Daytona qualifier the following month, the team apparently packed it in due to lack of funding.

Preceded by none	NASCAR Winston Cup Season; 1973	Succeeded by 1973 Daytona 500
Preceded by 1972	Winston Western 500 races 1973	Succeeded by 1974
