= 1973 National 500 =

Auto race held at Charlotte Motor Speedway in 1973

Race details
- Race 27 of 28 in the 1973 NASCAR Winston Cup Series
- 1973 National 500 program cover
- Date: October 7, 1973
- Official name: National 500
- Location: Charlotte Motor Speedway, Concord, North Carolina
- Course: Permanent racing facility
- Course length: 1.500 miles (2.414 km)
- Distance: 334 laps, 500 mi (804 km)
- Weather: Mild with temperatures of 75.9 °F (24.4 °C); wind speeds of 15 miles per hour (24 km/h)
- Average speed: 145.240 miles per hour (233.741 km/h)
- Attendance: 64,000

Pole position
Driver	David Pearson	Wood Brothers Racing

Most laps led
Driver	Cale Yarborough	Howard & Egerton Racing
- Laps: 257

Winner
No. 11	Cale Yarborough	Howard & Egerton Racing

Radio in the United States
- Radio: MRN
- Booth announcers: Ken Squier, Marvin Panch
- Turn announcers: Hill Overton, Barney Hall

The 1973 National 500 was a NASCAR Winston Cup Series racing event that took place on October 7, 1973, at Charlotte Motor Speedway in Concord, North Carolina.

The Yom Kippur war between Israel and the Arabs broke out the day before. The Arab oil embargo soon went into effect and resulted in cancellation of the Texas race and shortening of 1974 races by 10%. Charlotte Motor Speedway was undergoing a leadership shakeup as original owner Bruton Smith was purchasing stock from holders looking to cash out; by 1973 he'd amassed nearly half the 1.4 million shares accounted for by the Speedway and despite public denials was seeking to usurp Richard Howard, the Speedway president appointed as such by bankruptcy court in 1963.

== Qualifying ==
The first driver to qualify for pole, Charlie Glotzbach, was found in a post qualifying inspection to have modified his restrictor plate in an illegal fashion. Glotsbach's team was fined $500 and the $1,000 pole bonus he was to receive was rescinded. Glotsbach was forced to re-qualify after changes were made to the car to make it legal, and qualified 34th. Pole was then awarded to David Pearson, who had qualified second.

Dean Dalton, whose performance on Saturday did not qualify him for the race, was allowed into the race 41st on the grid, because of the above.

== Race report ==
334 laps took place on a paved track spanning 1.500 miles (2.414 km) with two cautions given out for sixteen laps. However, the race took three hours and twenty-six minutes to finish with Cale Yarborough defeating Richard Petty by a time of 1.4 seconds. Yarborough and Petty would lap the field three times before retrieving the checkered flag. David Pearson won the official pole position with a speed of 158.315 miles per hour (254.783 km/h) - which was equivalent to 34.109 seconds. Sixty-four thousand people attended this live racing event. The race had a mobile home (driven by Tim Flock) to accompany the drivers and their vehicles on the opening parade lap; which was unusual back then by NASCAR standards and is still considered to be unusual in today's NASCAR.

Harry Gant would make his racing debut here; ultimately finishing in 11th place. Dick Trickle also made his debut here, finishing an impressive fifth. Wendell Scott would retire after this race; making a 12th-place finish in this event. Johnny Barnes' 15th-place run was his best in Cup competition. Wayne Andrews would pull out of the race on lap 5 due to engine problems.

Buddy Baker retired his car on lap 228, and team owner Nord Krauskopf refused to allow NASCAR to inspect the car after this was done. NASCAR disqualified the team, and therefore, Buddy Baker officially finished 41st. Baker was the last driver to be disqualified for technical infractions until 1992 (when Bobby Hillin Jr. was disqualified from the 1992 Mello Yello 500), after which NASCAR stopped disqualifying drivers until a 2019 rule change.

What made this race extra important to drivers was that $100 was given out for every lap that a driver led ($725.26 when adjusted for inflation). Yarborough and Petty were said to have engines in their cars that exceeded the horsepower permitted by NASCAR during that era. Bobby Allison filed a complaint with Bill France Jr. which resulted in a 6-hour meeting and "satisfactory restitution".

Wind speeds at this race would reach an average of 6.9 miles per hour (11.1 km/h). The race was held on a dry circuit; with no precipitation recorded around the speedway.

=== Qualifying ===
Grid	No.	Driver	Manufacturer
1	21	David Pearson	'71 Mercury
2	11	Cale Yarborough	'73 Chevrolet
3	12	Bobby Allison	'73 Chevrolet
4	43	Richard Petty	'73 Dodge
5	71	Buddy Baker	'73 Dodge
6	15	Darrell Waltrip	'73 Ford
7	72	Benny Parsons	'73 Chevrolet
8	1	Dick Trickle	'73 Chevrolet
9	88	Donnie Allison	'73 Chevrolet
10	48	James Hylton	'73 Chevrolet
11	24	Cecil Gordon	'72 Chevrolet
12	54	Lennie Pond	'73 Chevrolet
13	67	Buddy Arrington	'72 Plymouth
14	31	Jim Vandiver	'72 Dodge
15	02	L.D. Ottinger	'73 Chevrolet
16	79	Frank Warren	'73 Dodge
17	90	Harry Gant	'72 Ford
18	2	Dave Marcis	'73 Matador
19	49	G.C. Spencer	'72 Dodge
20	30	Walter Ballard	'71 Mercury

== Finishing order ==
Section reference:

Fin	St	#	Driver	Sponsor	Make	Laps	Led	Status
1	2	11	Cale Yarborough	Kar-Kare	'73 Chevrolet	334	257	running
2	4	43	Richard Petty	STP	'73 Dodge	334	52	running
3	3	12	Bobby Allison	Coca-Cola	'73 Chevrolet	331	9	running
4	7	72	Benny Parsons	DeWitt Racing	'73 Chevrolet	330	0	running
5	8	1	Dick Trickle	A&W Root Beer	'73 Chevrolet	327	2	running
6	12	54	Lennie Pond	Master Chevy Sales	'73 Chevrolet	325	1	running
7	13	67	Buddy Arrington	Cherokee Construction	'72 Plymouth	319	0	running
8	39	64	Elmo Langley	Langley Racing	'72 Ford	318	0	running
9	11	24	Cecil Gordon	Gordon Racing	'72 Chevrolet	315	0	running
10	32	19	Henley Gray	Warren Lindsey	'71 Mercury	308	0	running
11	17	90	Harry Gant	Truxmore Industries	'72 Ford	307	0	running
12	38	5	Wendell Scott	Faustina Racing, Kmart Special	'73 Dodge	305	0	running
13	10	48	James Hylton	Stott Chevrolet	'73 Chevrolet	302	0	running
14	25	77	Charlie Roberts	Sunny King	'72 Chevrolet	296	0	running
15	30	89	Johnny Barnes	Hopper-Crews	'71 Mercury	294	0	running
16	35	22	Jimmy Crawford	Black Part	'72 Plymouth	294	0	running
17	14	31	Jim Vandiver	Bradford Enterprises	'72 Dodge	291	0	running
18	24	96	Richard Childress	L.C. Newton Trucking	'73 Chevrolet	284	0	engine
19	22	14	Coo Coo Marlin	Cunningham-Kelley	'72 Chevrolet	282	0	engine
20	36	0	Eddie Bond	Bond Racing	'72 Dodge	281	0	engine
21	31	05	David Sisco	Sisco Racing	'72 Chevrolet	268	0	driveshaft
22	27	18	Joe Frasson	Pizza Huts of Charlotte	'73 Dodge	264	0	engine
23	20	30	Walter Ballard	Textilease	'71 Mercury	230	0	engine
24	18	2	Dave Marcis	Marcis Racing	'73 Matador	223	0	engine
25	41	25	Jabe Thomas	Robertson Racing	'73 Dodge	203	0	running
26	33	10	Bill Champion	Earl Powell Auto Parts	'71 Mercury	198	0	engine
27	23	44	Ed Negre	Brown Racing	'71 Chevrolet	183	0	engine
28	15	02	L.D. Ottinger	Lonesome Pine Raceway	'73 Chevrolet	137	0	engine
29	37	70	J.D. McDuffie	McDuffie Racing	'72 Chevrolet	113	0	engine
30	40	7	Dean Dalton	Belden Asphalt	'71 Mercury	90	0	engine
31	26	06	Neil Castles	Howard Furniture	'73 Dodge	64	0	suspension
32	9	88	Donnie Allison	DiGard Racing	'73 Chevrolet	61	0	engine
33	21	47	Raymond Williams	Williams Racing	'72 Ford	58	0	steering
34	29	32	Dick Brooks	Brooks Racing	'73 Dodge	49	0	engine
35	16	79	Frank Warren	Hinson Construction	'73 Dodge	47	0	engine
36	1	21	David Pearson	Purolator	'71 Mercury	46	12	crash
37	34	28	Charlie Glotzbach	Pylon Wiper Blades	'73 Chevrolet	46	1	crash
38	6	15	Darrell Waltrip	Sta-Power Industries	'73 Ford	46	0	crash
39	19	49	G.C. Spencer	Spencer Racing	'72 Dodge	13	0	engine
40	28	98	Wayne Andrews	Hylton Engineering	'71 Mercury	5	0	engine
41	5	71	Buddy Baker	K & K Insurance	'73 Dodge	228	0	disqualified

== Timeline ==
Section reference:

- Start of race: David Pearson started the race with the pole position.
- Lap 5: Wayne Andrews' engine problem forced him out of the race.
- Lap 13: G.C. Spencer's engine problem forced him out of the race.
- Lap 32: Charlie Glotzbach took over the lead from Cale Yarborough.
- Lap 33: Lennie Pond took over the lead from Charlie Glotzbach.
- Lap 34: David Pearson took over the lead from Lennie Pond.
- Lap 46: Cale Yarborough took over the lead from David Pearson.
- Lap 47: Frank Warren's engine problem forced him out of the race.
- Lap 49: Dick Brooks' engine problem forced him out of the race.
- Lap 53: Dick Trickle took over the lead from Cale Yarbrough.
- Lap 55: Bobby Allison took over the lead from Dick Trickle.
- Lap 61: Donnie Allison's engine problem forced him out of the race.
- Lap 64: Neil Castles developed problems with his vehicle's suspension while Cale Yarborough took over the lead from Bobby Allison.
- Lap 223: Dave Marcis' engine problem forced him out of the race.
- Lap 228: Buddy Baker was disqualified by NASCAR due to non-compliance regarding engine inspection.
- Lap 230: Walter Ballard's engine problem forced him out of the race.
- Lap 233: Richard Petty took over the lead from Cale Yarborough.
- Lap 264: Joe Frasson's engine problem forced him out of the race.
- Lap 271: Cale Yarborough took over the lead from Richard Petty.
- Lap 281: Eddie Bond's engine problem forced him out of the race.
- Lap 282: Coo Coo Marlin's engine problem forced him out of the race.
- Lap 284: Richard Childress' engine problem forced him out of the race.
- Lap 299: Richard Petty took over the lead from Cale Yarborough.
- Lap 313: Cale Yarborough took over the lead from Richard Petty.
- Finish: Cale Yarborough was officially declared the winner of the event.

Preceded by 1973 Old Dominion 500	NASCAR Winston Cup Series Season; 1973	Succeeded by 1973 American 500

Preceded by 1972	National 500 races 1973	Succeeded by 1974
