= 1973 American 500 =

Auto race held at North Carolina Motor Speedway in 1973

Race details
- Race 28 of 28 in the 1973 NASCAR Winston Cup Series
- Layout of Rockingham Speedway
- Date: October 21, 1973
- Official name: American 500
- Location: North Carolina Motor Speedway, Rockingham, North Carolina
- Course: Permanent racing facility
- Course length: 1.017 miles (1.636 km)
- Distance: 492 laps, 500 mi (804 km)
- Weather: Very hot with temperatures of 81.9 °F (27.7 °C); wind speeds of 9.9 miles per hour (15.9 km/h)
- Average speed: 117.749 miles per hour (189.499 km/h)
- Attendance: 48,000

Pole position
Driver	Richard Petty	Petty Enterprises
- Time: 26.970

Most laps led
Driver	David Pearson	Wood Brothers Racing
- Laps: 396

Winner
No. 21	David Pearson	Wood Brothers Racing

The 1973 American 500 was a NASCAR Winston Cup Series racing event that took place on October 21, 1973, at North Carolina Motor Speedway in Rockingham, North Carolina. This event would mark the only instance that a NASCAR Cup Series season would end at Rockingham Speedway. Having a 43-car racing grid was a very infrequent case during this era of NASCAR racing. Today, it forms the mandated standards that NASCAR developed over the years.

This is also the earliest in the year a Cup season has finished since the inaugural season in 1949, and the last time there have been no races in November.

1973 would become the "year of the smaller engine" while declining sponsorship interests for the drivers resulted in NASCAR keeping the bigger gas-guzzling engines from being abolished from the sport. Following this race, NASCAR started to tighten up on their pre-race inspections as a precautionary measure to ensure that only legal racing components are being used.

== Background ==
North Carolina Motor Speedway is a closed racetrack located near Rockingham, North Carolina. It is affectionately known as "The Rock".

== Race report ==
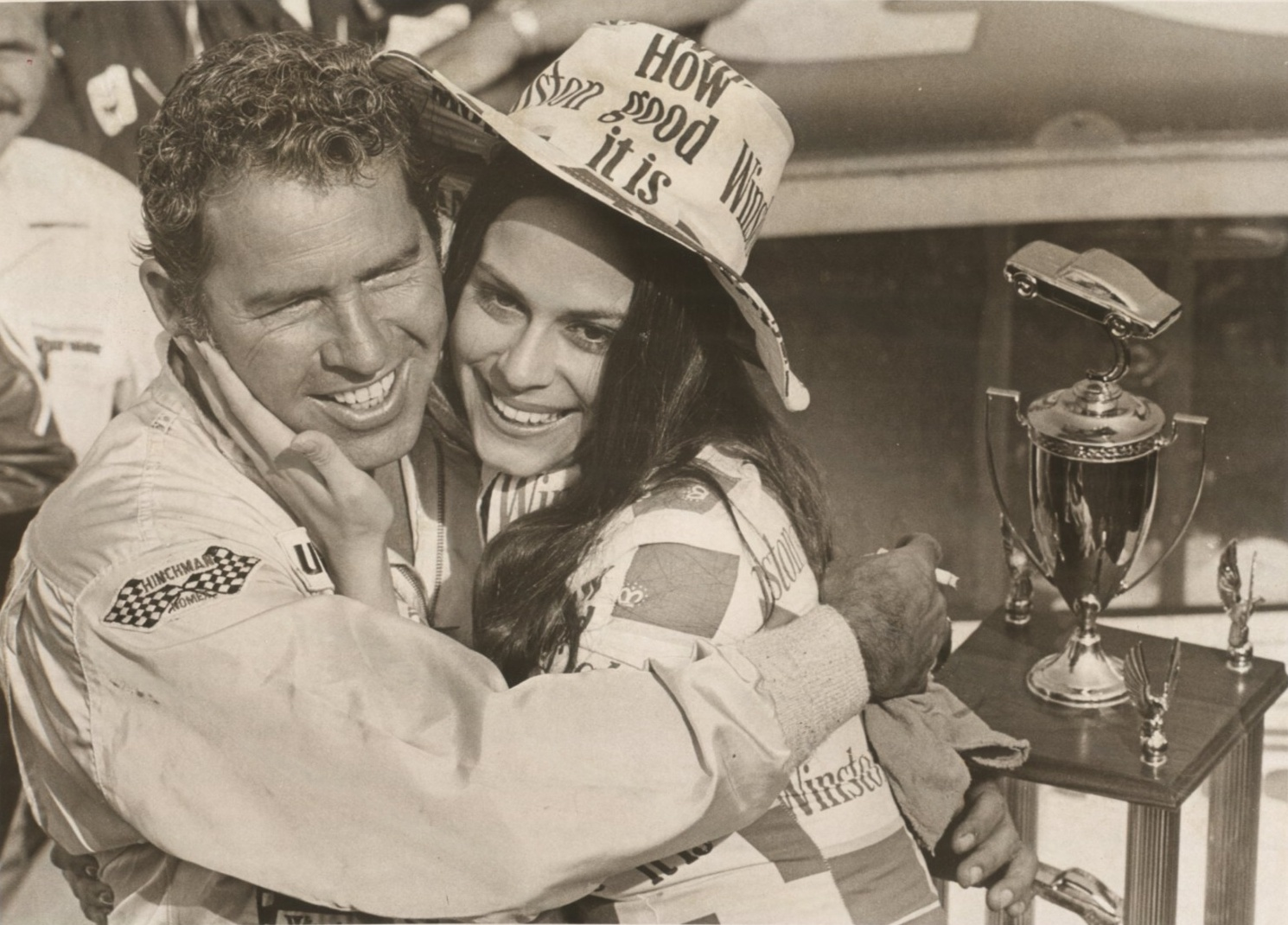
Pearson celebrating his win

David Pearson would defeat Buddy Baker by at least one lap after nearly four hours and fifteen minutes of racing. While the green flag was waved at noon, the checkered flag wasn't officially waved until 4:15 PM. Exactly 48,000 people would see 20 different lead changes and five caution flags for a staggering distance of 36 laps. While the average speed of the race was 117.749 miles per hour (189.499 km/h), Richard Petty would clinch the pole position in qualifying for his amazing run that reached 135.748 miles per hour (218.465 km/h).

Pearson ended the 1973 NASCAR Winston Cup Series season with 18 starts and 11 wins. Every time Pearson was running at the end of a race he finished either 1st, 2nd, or 3rd while leading led 2,658 of 5,338 laps in the process.

The complete racing grid was 43 American-born drivers; including the last-place finisher Frank Warren who crashed on lap 13 out of the 492 laps that made up the advertised distance. Benny Parsons would return to the track after being a part of that lap 13 crash which destroyed the whole right side of his car. Travis Carter, his crew and volunteers, including Ralph Moody and his staff of 20 people managed to complete repairs to Parsons's car in an hour and eight minutes. They had to replace a rear axle, rear suspension, sidebars, braking system, and roll bar cage, cannibalizing parts from a car that did not qualify for the race. He was able to return to the race 136 laps down, to cheers. Parsons would encounter some vibration issues on lap 308 that would knock him out of the race. Even with the DNF, he would slide into a comfortable 28th-place finish.

Only manual transmission vehicles were allowed to participate in this race; a policy that NASCAR has retained to the present day. Other notable drivers in this race included Darrell Waltrip, Elmo Langley, and Richard Childress (now the owner of Richard Childress Racing). Eddie Bond, John Sears, and Paul Tyler would retire from NASCAR after this racing event. Souvenir racing programs were sold at the event for the then-inexpensive cost of $2 USD per copy ($14.51 when adjusted for inflation).

Benny Parsons would eventually win the Winston Cup Championship after this race by a mere 67 points over runner-up Cale Yarborough. Even though Parsons would finish in 28th during the race in his Chevrolet Chevelle Laguna machine, Yarborough's third-place finish would not earn him enough points to overtake the championship lead. Individual race winnings for this event varied in grandeur from the winner's share of $16,795 ($121,808 when adjusted for inflation) to the last-place finisher's share of $485 ($3,518 when adjusted for inflation). NASCAR officials allowed a grand total of $99,715 to be given to the finishers of this racing event ($723,195 when adjusted for inflation).

=== Qualifying ===
Grid	No.	Driver	Manufacturer	Speed	Qualifying time	Owner
1	43	Richard Petty	'73 Dodge	135.748	26.970	Petty Enterprises
2	21	David Pearson	'71 Mercury	135.352	27.049	Wood Brothers
3	88	Donnie Allison	'73 Chevrolet	134.695	27.181	DiGard
4	12	Bobby Allison	'73 Chevrolet	134.487	27.223	Bobby Allison
5	72	Benny Parsons	'73 Chevrolet	134.398	27.241	L.G. DeWitt
7	88	Lennie Pond	'73 Chevrolet	133.040	27.519	Ronnie Elder
8	14	Coo Coo Marlin	'72 Chevrolet	132.823	27.564	H.B. Cunningham
8	15	Darrell Waltrip	'73 Ford	132.703	27.589	Bud Moore
9	2	Dave Marcis	'73 AMC Matador	132.319	27.669	Roger Penske
10	32	Dick Brooks	'73 Dodge	132.223	27.689	Dick Brooks

== Top 10 finishers ==
Pos	Grid	No.	Driver	Manufacturer	Money	Laps	Laps led	Time/Status
1	2	21	David Pearson	Mercury	$16,795	492	396	4:14:54
2	16	71	Buddy Baker	Dodge	$11,050	491	0	+1 laps
3	18	11	Cale Yarborough	Chevrolet	$7,925	491	85	+1 laps
4	4	12	Bobby Allison	Chevrolet	$6,525	488	1	+4 laps
5	9	2	Dave Marcis	AMC Matador	$4,175	484	0	+8 laps
6	3	88	Donnie Allison	Chevrolet	$2,725	484	0	+8 laps
7	10	32	Dick Brooks	Dodge	$2,525	483	1	+9 laps
8	13	90	Charlie Glotzbach	Mercury	$2,625	483	0	+9 laps
9	7	54	Lennie Pond	Chevrolet	$1,625	481	0	+11 laps
10	8	14	Coo Coo Marlin	Chevrolet	$1,925	479	1	+13 laps

Preceded by 1973 National 500	NASCAR Winston Cup Series Season; 1973-74	Succeeded by 1974 Winston Western 500

Preceded by 1972	American 500 races 1973	Succeeded by 1974
