= Vic Parsons =

Canadian racing driver

- Born: November 29, 1939 (age 86); Willowdale, Ontario, Canada

NASCAR Cup Series career
- 19 races run over 2 years
- Best finish: 30th - 1973 NASCAR Winston Cup Series season
- First race: 1972 Wilkes 400 (North Wilkesboro Speedway
- Last race: 1973 Delaware 500 (Dover Downs International Speedway)
Wins	Top tens	Poles
0	7	0

Vic Parsons (born November 29, 1939) is a Canadian retired NASCAR driver from Willowdale, Ontario (a suburb of Toronto). He competed in nineteen Winston Cup Series events in his career with seven top-tens.

He is not related to 1973 NASCAR Winston Cup champion Benny Parsons.

== Cup career ==
Parsons made his debut in 1972, making the show at North Wilkesboro Speedway with a 19th place qualifying effort. Parsons then survived the tough short track and ended up with a top-ten in his first career race-ninth.

Parsons stepped it up to eighteen races in 1973, when he finished 30th in the points standings. Driving for car owner, Bill Seifer, Parsons recorded an unprecedented six top-tens. That included a career best seventh place in the July race at Daytona. The other top-tens were a trio of ninths and a duo of tenths. However, the news was not all good for Parsons. Even with six top-tens, Parsons' team struggled to finish races. In fact, in eighteen starts, Parsons' team only finished seven of them.

== See also ==
List of Canadians in NASCAR
