= 1979 Virginia 500 =

Race details
- Race 9 of 31 in the 1979 NASCAR Winston Cup Series
- The 1979 Virginia 500 program cover, parodying the Star Wars film.
- Date: April 22, 1979
- Location: Martinsville Speedway, Martinsville, Virginia
- Course: Permanent racing facility
- Course length: 0.525 miles (0.845 km)
- Distance: 500 laps, 262.5 mi (422.453 km)
- Attendance: 35,500

Pole position
Driver	Darrell Waltrip	DiGard Motorsports

Most laps led
Driver	Richard Petty	Petty Enterprises
- Laps: 247

Winner
No. 43	Richard Petty	Petty Enterprises

The 1979 Virginia 500 was the 9th stock car race of the 1979 NASCAR Winston Cup Series season. The race took place at Martinsville Speedway in Martinsville, Virginia on April 22, 1979 before a crowd of 35,500. Richard Petty, driving for his team Petty Enterprises would win the race by 4 seconds, leading 247 laps. Buddy Baker of Ranier-Lundy Racing and Darrell Waltrip of DiGard Motorsports would finish 2nd and 3rd, respectively.

The layout of Martinsville Speedway, the venue where the race was held.

== Background ==
Entry list
#	Driver	Team	Make	Sponsor
1	Donnie Allison	Ellington Racing	Chevrolet	Hawaiian Tropic
2	Dale Earnhardt	Rod Osterlund Racing	Chevrolet	Rod Osterlund Racing
02	Dave Marcis	Marcis Auto Racing	Chevrolet	Shoney's
3	Richard Childress	Richard Childress Racing	Chevrolet	CRC Chemicals
05	Dick Brooks	Nelson Malloch Racing	Oldsmobile	Bearfinder
11	Cale Yarborough	Junior Johnson & Associates	Oldsmobile	Busch
12	Lennie Pond	Kennie Childers Racing	Chevrolet	Kencoal Mining
15	Bobby Allison	Bud Moore Engineering	Ford	Hodgdon, Moore
19	Dick May	Gray Racing	Chevrolet	Belden Asphalt
21	Neil Bonnett	Wood Brothers Racing	Mercury	Purolator
24	Cecil Gordon	Gordon Racing	Oldsmobile	Gordon-Barnicle
25	Ronnie Thomas	Robertson Racing	Chevrolet	1st National City Travelers Checks
27	Benny Parsons	M. C. Anderson Racing	Chevrolet	Power Tool Service
28	Buddy Baker	Ranier-Lundy Racing	Chevrolet	Spectra
30	Tighe Scott	Ballard Racing	Buick	Russ Togs
40	D.K. Ulrich	Ulrich Racing	Chevrolet	Midwestern Farm Lines
43	Richard Petty	Petty Enterprises	Chevrolet	STP
44	Terry Labonte	Hagan Racing	Chevrolet	Stratagraph
45	Baxter Price	Price Racing	Chevrolet	Price Racing
47	Harry Gant	Race Hill Farm Team	Chevrolet	Race Hill Farm
48	James Hylton	Hylton Racing	Chevrolet	Palatine Automotive Parts
52	Jimmy Means	Means Racing	Chevrolet	Mr. Transmission
64	Tommy Gale	Langley Racing	Ford	Sunny King Ford & Honda
67	Buddy Arrington	Arrington Racing	Dodge	Reid Trailer Sales
68	Chuck Bown	Testa Racing	Buick	Kings Mountain Truck Plaza
70	J.D. McDuffie	McDuffie Racing	Chevrolet	Bailey Excavating
72	Joe Millikan	DeWitt Racing	Chevrolet	Appliance Wheels
79	Frank Warren	Warren Racing	Dodge	Native Tan
88	Darrell Waltrip	DiGard Motorsports	Chevrolet	Gatorade
90	Ricky Rudd	Donlavey Racing	Ford	Truxmore

== Qualifying ==
Pos.	#	Driver	Team	Make	Time	Speed
1	88	Darrell Waltrip	DiGard Motorsports	Chevrolet		
2	43	Richard Petty	Petty Enterprises	Chevrolet		
3	15	Bobby Allison	Bud Moore Engineering	Ford		
4	28	Buddy Baker	Ranier-Lundy Racing	Chevrolet		
5	11	Cale Yarborough	Junior Johnson & Associates	Oldsmobile		
6	12	Lennie Pond	Kennie Childers Racing	Chevrolet		
7	68	Chuck Bown	Testa Racing	Buick		
8	72	Joe Millikan	DeWitt Racing	Chevrolet		
9	21	Neil Bonnett	Wood Brothers Racing	Mercury		
10	70	J.D. McDuffie	McDuffie Racing	Chevrolet		
11	2	Dale Earnhardt	Rod Osterlund Racing	Chevrolet		
12	1	Donnie Allison	Ellington Racing	Chevrolet		
13	27	Benny Parsons	M. C. Anderson Racing	Chevrolet		
14	48	James Hylton	Hylton Racing	Chevrolet		
15	40	D.K. Ulrich	Ulrich Racing	Chevrolet		
16	3	Richard Childress	Richard Childress Racing	Chevrolet		
17	90	Ricky Rudd	Donlavey Racing	Ford		
18	67	Buddy Arrington	Arrington Racing	Dodge		
19	44	Terry Labonte	Hagan Racing	Chevrolet		
20	79	Frank Warren	Warren Racing	Dodge		
21	47	Harry Gant	Race Hill Farm Team	Chevrolet		
22	30	Tighe Scott	Ballard Racing	Buick		
23	19	Dick May	Gray Racing	Chevrolet		
24	02	Dave Marcis	Marcis Auto Racing	Chevrolet		
25	64	Tommy Gale	Langley Racing	Ford		
26	25	Ronnie Thomas	Robertson Racing	Chevrolet		
27	05	Dick Brooks	Nelson Malloch Racing	Oldsmobile		
28	52	Jimmy Means	Means Racing	Chevrolet		
29	45	Baxter Price	Price Racing	Chevrolet		
30	24	Cecil Gordon	Gordon Racing	Oldsmobile		

== Race results ==
Fin	St	#	Driver	Team	Make	Laps	Led	Status	Pts	Winnings
1	2	43	Richard Petty	Petty Enterprises	Chevrolet	500	247	running	185	$23,400
2	4	28	Buddy Baker	Ranier-Lundy Racing	Chevrolet	500	196	running	175	$14,700
3	1	88	Darrell Waltrip	DiGard Motorsports	Chevrolet	499	49	running	170	$10,200
4	3	15	Bobby Allison	Bud Moore Engineering	Ford	498	1	running	165	$7,100
5	8	72	Joe Millikan	DeWitt Racing	Chevrolet	497	0	running	155	$6,550
6	21	47	Harry Gant	Race Hill Farm Team	Chevrolet	497	0	running	150	$2,500
7	14	48	James Hylton	Hylton Racing	Chevrolet	495	7	engine	151	$4,200
8	11	2	Dale Earnhardt	Rod Osterlund Racing	Chevrolet	495	0	running	142	$4,200
9	19	44	Terry Labonte	Hagan Racing	Chevrolet	494	0	running	138	$3,350
10	10	70	J.D. McDuffie	McDuffie Racing	Chevrolet	493	0	running	134	$3,080
11	5	11	Cale Yarborough	Junior Johnson & Associates	Oldsmobile	492	0	running	130	$5,050
12	17	90	Ricky Rudd	Donlavey Racing	Ford	489	0	running	127	$2,470
13	22	30	Tighe Scott	Ballard Racing	Buick	488	0	running	124	$2,300
14	16	3	Richard Childress	Richard Childress Racing	Chevrolet	485	0	running	121	$2,140
15	15	40	D.K. Ulrich	Ulrich Racing	Chevrolet	476	0	running	118	$1,980
16	25	64	Tommy Gale	Langley Racing	Ford	476	0	running	115	$1,820
17	30	24	Cecil Gordon	Gordon Racing	Oldsmobile	474	0	running	112	$1,685
18	20	79	Frank Warren	Warren Racing	Dodge	472	0	running	109	$1,500
19	13	27	Benny Parsons	M. C. Anderson Racing	Chevrolet	458	0	running	106	$675
20	26	25	Ronnie Thomas	Robertson Racing	Chevrolet	454	0	running	103	$2,150
21	27	05	Dick Brooks	Nelson Malloch Racing	Oldsmobile	437	0	running	100	$640
22	18	67	Buddy Arrington	Arrington Racing	Dodge	312	0	engine	97	$1,130
23	7	68	Chuck Bown	Testa Racing	Buick	263	0	engine		$620
24	29	45	Baxter Price	Price Racing	Chevrolet	247	0	engine	91	$860
25	9	21	Neil Bonnett	Wood Brothers Racing	Mercury	207	0	engine	88	$850
26	24	02	Dave Marcis	Marcis Auto Racing	Chevrolet	167	0	engine	85	$590
27	12	1	Donnie Allison	Ellington Racing	Chevrolet	137	0	engine	82	$3,030
28	28	52	Jimmy Means	Means Racing	Chevrolet	132	0	overheating	79	$820
29	6	12	Lennie Pond	Kennie Childers Racing	Chevrolet	10	0	engine	76	$810
30	23	19	Dick May	Gray Racing	Chevrolet	0	0	engine		$800

Preceded by 1979 CRC Chemicals Rebel 500	NASCAR Winston Cup Series Season; 1979	Succeeded by 1979 Winston 500
