= Cook Out 400 (Martinsville) =

NASCAR Cup Series spring race Martinsville Speedway

NASCAR Cup Series
- Venue: Martinsville Speedway
- Location: Ridgeway, Virginia, United States
- Corporate sponsor: Cook Out
- First race: 1950
- Distance: 210.4 mi (338.606 km)
- Laps: 400; Stage 1: 80; Stage 2: 100; Final stage: 220
- Previous names: Unnamed (1950–1955); Virginia 500 (1956–1981, 2001–2003); Virginia 500 Sweepstakes (second 1961 race); Virginia National Bank 500 (1982–1983); Sovran Bank 500 (1984–1987); Pannill Sweatshirts 500 (1988–1989); Hanes Activewear 500 (1990); Hanes 500 (1991–1995); Goody's Headache Powder 500 (1996–1998); Goody's Body Pain 500 (1999–2000); Advance Auto Parts 500 (2004–2005); DirecTV 500 (2006); Goody's Cool Orange 500 (2007–2008); Goody's Fast Pain Relief 500 (2009–2010); Goody's Fast Relief 500 (2011–2012); STP Gas Booster 500 (2013); STP 500 (2014–2019); Blue-Emu Maximum Pain Relief 500 (2020–2021); Blue-Emu Maximum Pain Relief 400 (2022); NOCO 400 (2023)
- Most wins (driver): Richard Petty (9)
- Most wins (team): Petty Enterprises; Hendrick Motorsports (12)
- Most wins (manufacturer): Chevrolet (30)

Circuit information
- Surface: Asphalt (straightaways and top of turns); Concrete (turns)
- Length: 0.526 mi (0.847 km)
- Turns: 4

The Cook Out 400 is an annual NASCAR Cup Series stock car race held at the 0.526-mile (0.847 km) Martinsville Speedway in Ridgeway, Virginia. It is the first of two Cup Series races at the track, the other one being the Xfinity 500 in the NASCAR Chase.

Unlike other races at which the winner receives a trophy, the winner of this race and other NASCAR races at Martinsville receives a grandfather clock, which has been a tradition since 1964.

== History ==
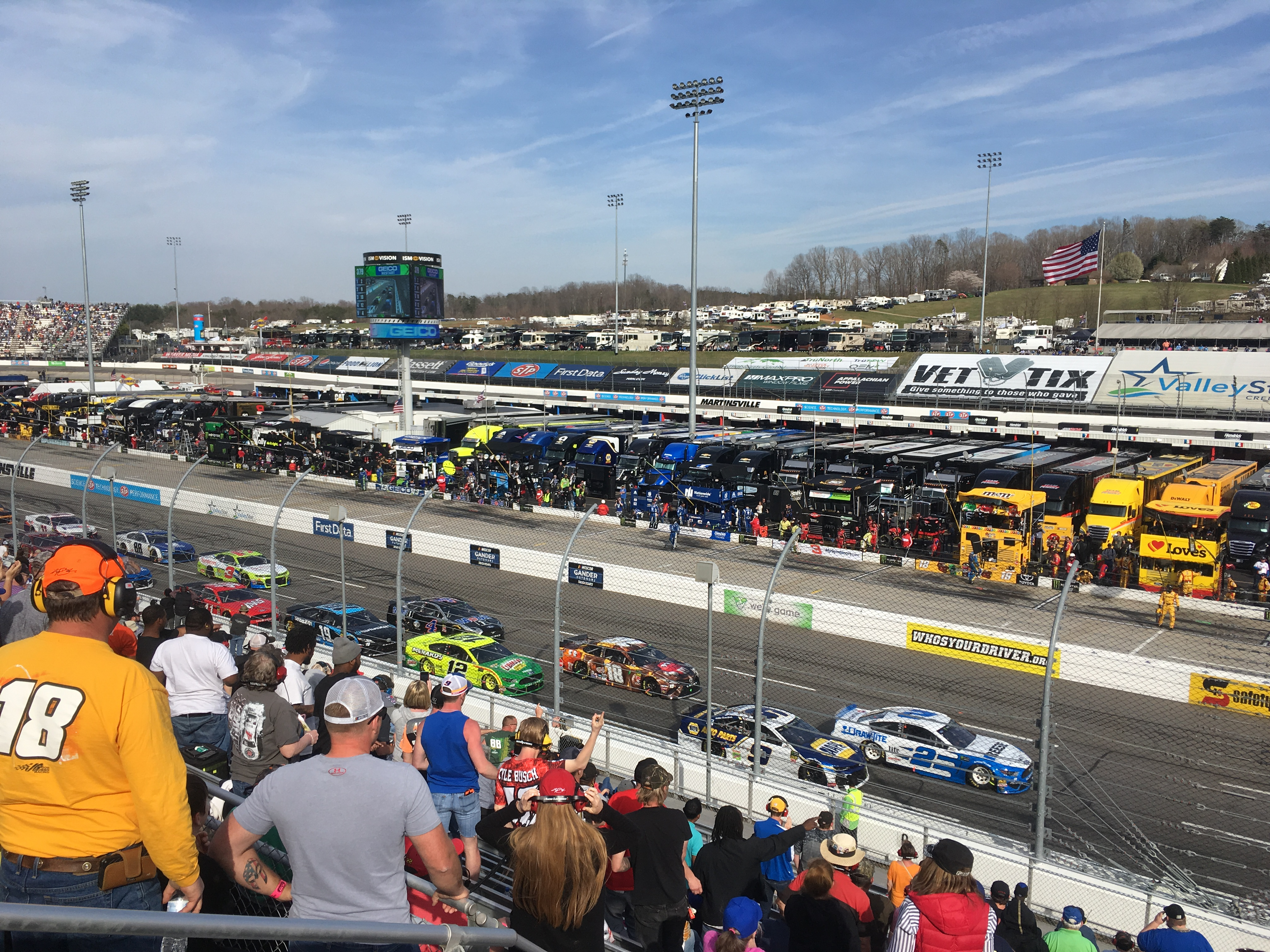
The 2019 race

The race had no name from 1950 to 1955, before taking the name Virginia 500 in 1956.

Goody's Powder, which was the title sponsor of the spring Martinsville Cup Series race from 1996 to 2000 and the fall Martinsville Cup Series race from 1983 to 1995, returned as the title sponsor of the spring race in 2007 to promote their new orange-flavored brand, Cool Orange, with the race title being Goody's Cool Orange 500. During this time, this race was the sixth race of the season and the first race where the current season's owner point standings were used to determine which cars were "go-or-go-homers" and needed to qualify into the race. (For the first five races, it was the previous season's owner point standings used to determine which cars were locked in the race.)

From 2008 to 2012, the fall Cup Series race at Martinsville was sponsored Tums, which was owned by the same parent company (British pharmaceutical conglomerate GSK plc) as Goody's. In 2013, they reduced their title sponsorship to only the fall race with Goody's replacing Tums as the brand that was advertised in the race sponsorship. Legendary NASCAR and Richard Petty sponsor STP became the title sponsor of the spring race starting in 2013 and remained through 2019.

In 2020, Blue-Emu took over naming rights for the race as part of a multi-year deal with NASCAR.

In 2022, the race was shortened to 400 laps. In 2023, The NOCO Company, which makes car parts such as batteries, battery chargers and jumper cables, replaced Blue-Emu as the title sponsor of the race. In 2024, the race had another new title sponsor, Cook Out.

== Notable races ==
- 1953: Herb Thomas was originally declared the winner, but a recheck showed that he had been credited with an extra lap.
- 1971: Controversy dogged Richard Petty's win as he lost his gas cap (dry-break fuel couplers were not mandated until 1974) during the race but was not black-flagged; there had been incidents of drivers flagged to get gas caps under green.
- 1973: David Pearson won his first short track race since 1971, driving the Wood Brothers Mercury.
- 1976: Darrell Waltrip took the win, the first for the DiGard Motorsports Chevrolet.
- 1979: Richard Petty posted his first win in a Chevrolet and first short track win since 1975.
- 1981: Morgan Shepherd stunned the field with his first career Winston Cup win. It also marked the first victory since October 1963 for the Pontiac nameplate, who had been on a seventeen-year hiatus from NASCAR. Of Shepherd's four career victories, this was the only one at a track other than Atlanta.
- 1982: After nearly a dozen second-place finishes, Harry Gant pulled down his first win.
- 1984: Geoff Bodine edged Ron Bouchard for the win, the first for Bodine and the first for Hendrick Motorsports; it was also the first for crew chief Harry Hyde since 1977.
- 1986: Ricky Rudd won a race where wrecks and blown engines put the entire field behind him at least one lap down.
- 1989: Darrell Waltrip won, the final win for Chevrolet's bubble-glassed Monte Carlo race car; the Monte Carlo was replaced by the Lumina.
- 1990: Geoff Bodine posted his first win with Junior Johnson.
- 1991: Dale Earnhardt scores his 50th Cup win, one day before his 40th birthday.
- 1993–1996: Rusty Wallace went on to win four consecutive Martinsville Spring Races in this time frame. He would become only the 2nd driver in the track's history, and the only driver in the history of the Spring Race, to win the same Martinsville event four years in a row. Richard Petty would accomplish this feat in the fall race from 1967–1970.
- 1997: Jeff Gordon edged Bobby Hamilton for the win, ending a four-race win streak in the Virginia 500 by Rusty Wallace.
- 1998: Bobby Hamilton drove the Morgan–McClure Motorsports Chevrolet to the win; he engaged in several bouts of multi-lap drag-racing with John Andretti, driving the Petty Enterprises Pontiac that Hamilton had driven the previous three seasons.
- 1999: John Andretti lost a lap after being tagged by Ward Burton; he made up the lap and ran down Jeff Burton; in the final ten laps he and Burton raced nose to nose for several laps before Andretti rallied to the win, his first for Petty Enterprises, the 200th short track win for the team, and the first for the team since 1997. This was the 268th and final win for Petty Enterprises.
- 2002: Bobby Labonte posted his first career short-track win.
- 2004: Rusty Wallace posted his final Nextel Cup win.
- 2007: This was the second race for NASCAR's new Cup Series car, the Car of Tomorrow. Hendrick Motorsports teammates Jeff Gordon and Jimmie Johnson had an exciting battle for the win in the closing laps with Johnson prevailing despite Gordon's attempts to pass him and him hitting the side of Johnson's car and Johnson's bumper multiple times while attempting to pass him.
- 2010: Denny Hamlin stormed four-abreast through traffic on a late restart to steal the win.
- 2012: Ryan Newman stormed to the checkered flag because of the wreck that happened before. Clint Bowyer hit both Jimmie Johnson and Jeff Gordon during the first attempt. Newman held off A. J. Allmendinger on the second attempt to win the Goody's Fast Relief 500.
- 2014: Kurt Busch posted his first win with Stewart–Haas Racing after passing Jimmie Johnson with eleven laps to go. The win was Busch's first in two seasons following his firing from Penske Racing and numerous confrontations with media. The race lead changed 33 times, a track record, breaking the 31 sets in Kevin Harvick's 2011 win.
- 2018: The race was postponed to Monday due to snow. Clint Bowyer won the race, breaking a 190-race winless streak dating back to 2012.
- 2019: Brad Keselowski dominated by leading 446 laps and winning the race.
- 2020: The race was scheduled to be the track's first-ever night race in the Cup Series.

== Past winners ==
Year	Date	No.	Driver	Team	Manufacturer	Race distance		Race time	Average speed (mph)	Report	Ref
Year	Date	No.	Driver	Team	Manufacturer	Laps	Miles (km)	Race time	Average speed (mph)	Report	Ref
1950	May 21	41	Curtis Turner	John Eanes	Oldsmobile	150	75 (120.7)			Report	
1951	May 6	41	Curtis Turner	John Eanes	Oldsmobile	200	100 (160.934)			Report	
1952	April 6	120	Dick Rathmann	Walt Chapman	Hudson	200	100 (160.934)	2:19:59	42.862	Report	
1953	May 17	42	Lee Petty	Petty Enterprises	Dodge	200	100 (160.934)			Report	
1954	May 16	87	Jim Paschal	Bob Griffin	Oldsmobile	200	100 (160.934)	2:10:04	46.130	Report	
1955	May 15	300	Tim Flock	Carl Kiekhaefer	Chrysler	200	100 (160.934)	1:54:10	52.555	Report	
1956	May 20	502	Buck Baker	Carl Kiekhaefer	Dodge	500	250 (402.336)	4:06:07	60.947	Report	
1957	May 19	87	Buck Baker	Hugh Babb	Chevrolet	441*	220.5 (354.86)	3:50:49	57.318	Report	
1958	April 20	4	Bob Welborn	Julian Petty	Chevrolet	500	250 (402.336)	4:05:27	66.007	Report	
1959	May 3	42	Lee Petty	Petty Enterprises	Oldsmobile	500	250 (402.336)	4:12:03	59.512	Report	
1960	April 10	43	Richard Petty	Petty Enterprises	Plymouth	500	250 (402.336)	3:54:35	63.943	Report	
1961*	April 9	28	Fred Lorenzen	Holman-Moody	Ford	149*	74.5 (119.896)	1:05:23	68.366	Report	
1961*	April 30	27	Junior Johnson	Rex Lovette	Pontiac	500	250 (402.336)	3:46:19	66.278	Report	
1962	April 22	43	Richard Petty	Petty Enterprises	Plymouth	500	250 (402.336)	3:45:49	66.425	Report	
1963	April 21	43	Richard Petty	Petty Enterprises	Plymouth	500	250 (402.336)	3:51:24	64.823	Report	
1964	April 26	28	Fred Lorenzen	Holman-Moody	Ford	500	250 (402.336)	3:33:59	70.098	Report	
1965	April 25	28	Fred Lorenzen	Holman-Moody	Ford	500	250 (402.336)	3:44:40	66.765	Report	
1966	April 24	14	Jim Paschal	Frieden Enterprises	Plymouth	500	250 (402.336)	3:36:54	69.156	Report	
1967	April 23	43	Richard Petty	Petty Enterprises	Plymouth	500	250 (402.336)	3:42:24	67.446	Report	
1968	April 28	21	Cale Yarborough	Wood Brothers Racing	Mercury	500	250 (402.336)	3:44:56	66.686	Report	
1969	April 27	43	Richard Petty	Petty Enterprises	Ford	500	250 (402.336)	3:52:54	64.405	Report	
1970	May 31	71	Bobby Isaac	Nord Krauskopf	Dodge	377*	197.925 (318.529)	2:53:20	68.584	Report	
1971	April 25	43	Richard Petty	Petty Enterprises	Plymouth	500	262.5 (422.452)	3:22:41	77.707	Report	
1972	April 30	43	Richard Petty	Petty Enterprises	Plymouth	500	262.5 (422.452)	3:37:00	72.657	Report	
1973	April 29	21	David Pearson	Wood Brothers Racing	Mercury	500	262.5 (422.452)	3:44:26	70.251	Report	
1974	April 28	11	Cale Yarborough	Richard Howard	Chevrolet	450*	236.25 (380.207)	3:22:41	70.427	Report	
1975	April 27	43	Richard Petty	Petty Enterprises	Dodge	500	262.5 (422.452)	3:47:15	69.282	Report	
1976	April 25	88	Darrell Waltrip	DiGard Motorsports	Chevrolet	500	262.5 (422.452)	3:39:43	71.759	Report	
1977	April 24	11	Cale Yarborough	Junior Johnson & Associates	Chevrolet	384*	201.6 (324.443)	2:36:26	77.405	Report	
1978	April 23	88	Darrell Waltrip	DiGard Motorsports	Chevrolet	500	262.5 (422.452)	3:22:00	77.971	Report	
1979	April 22	43	Richard Petty	Petty Enterprises	Chevrolet	500	262.5 (422.452)	3:25:43	76.562	Report	
1980	April 27	88	Darrell Waltrip	DiGard Motorsports	Chevrolet	500	262.5 (422.452)	3:48:06	69.049	Report	
1981	April 26	5	Morgan Shepherd	Cliff Stewart	Pontiac	500	262.5 (422.452)	3:30:10	75.019	Report	
1982	April 25	33	Harry Gant	Mach 1 Racing	Buick	500	262.5 (422.452)	3:30:01	75.073	Report	
1983	April 24	11	Darrell Waltrip	Junior Johnson & Associates	Chevrolet	500	262.5 (422.452)	3:57:14	66.46	Report	
1984	April 29	5	Geoff Bodine	All-Star Racing	Chevrolet	500	263 (423.257)	3:35:23	73.264	Report	
1985	April 28	33	Harry Gant	Mach 1 Racing	Chevrolet	500	263 (423.257)	3:16:06	73.022	Report	
1986	April 27	15	Ricky Rudd	Bud Moore Engineering	Ford	500	263 (423.257)	3:25:15	76.882	Report	
1987	April 26	3	Dale Earnhardt	Richard Childress Racing	Chevrolet	500	263 (423.257)	3:36:44	72.808	Report	
1988	April 24	3	Dale Earnhardt	Richard Childress Racing	Chevrolet	500	263 (423.257)	3:31:08	74.74	Report	
1989	April 23	17	Darrell Waltrip	Hendrick Motorsports	Chevrolet	500	263 (423.257)	3:19:41	79.025	Report	
1990	April 29	11	Geoff Bodine	Junior Johnson & Associates	Ford	500	263 (423.257)	3:23:49	77.423	Report	
1991	April 28	3	Dale Earnhardt	Richard Childress Racing	Chevrolet	500	263 (423.257)	3:26:41	75.139	Report	
1992	April 26	6	Mark Martin	Roush Racing	Ford	500	263 (423.257)	3:22:05	78.086	Report	
1993	April 25	2	Rusty Wallace	Penske Racing	Pontiac	500	263 (423.257)	3:18:33	79.078	Report	
1994	April 24	2	Rusty Wallace	Penske Racing	Ford	500	263 (423.257)	3:25:43	76.7	Report	
1995	April 23	2	Rusty Wallace	Penske Racing	Ford	356*	187.256 (301.359)	2:35:44	72.145	Report	
1996	April 21	2	Rusty Wallace	Penske Racing	Ford	500	263 (423.257)	3:13:50	81.41	Report	
1997	April 20	24	Jeff Gordon	Hendrick Motorsports	Chevrolet	500	263 (423.257)	3:44:19	70.347	Report	
1998	April 20	4	Bobby Hamilton	Morgan-McClure Motorsports	Chevrolet	500	263 (423.257)	3:43:10	70.709	Report	
1999	April 18	43	John Andretti	Petty Enterprises	Pontiac	500	263 (423.257)	3:28:35	75.653	Report	
2000	April 9	6	Mark Martin	Roush Racing	Ford	500	263 (423.257)	3:41:45	71.161	Report	
2001	April 8	88	Dale Jarrett	Robert Yates Racing	Ford	500	263 (423.257)	3:42:53	70.799	Report	
2002	April 14	18	Bobby Labonte	Joe Gibbs Racing	Pontiac	500	263 (423.257)	3:33:23	73.951	Report	
2003	April 13	24	Jeff Gordon	Hendrick Motorsports	Chevrolet	500	263 (423.257)	3:28:51	75.557	Report	
2004	April 18	2	Rusty Wallace	Penske Racing	Dodge	500	263 (423.257)	3:51:29	68.169	Report	
2005	April 10	24	Jeff Gordon	Hendrick Motorsports	Chevrolet	500	263 (423.257)	3:38:52	72.099	Report	
2006	April 2	20	Tony Stewart	Joe Gibbs Racing	Chevrolet	500	263 (423.257)	3:36:56	72.741	Report	
2007	April 1	48	Jimmie Johnson	Hendrick Motorsports	Chevrolet	500	263 (423.257)	3:44:36	70.258	Report	
2008	March 30	11	Denny Hamlin	Joe Gibbs Racing	Toyota	500	263 (423.257)	3:35:41	73.163	Report	
2009	March 29	48	Jimmie Johnson	Hendrick Motorsports	Chevrolet	500	263 (423.257)	3:27:48	75.938	Report	
2010	March 29*	11	Denny Hamlin	Joe Gibbs Racing	Toyota	508*	267.208 (430.029)	3:39:05	73.180	Report	
2011	April 3	29	Kevin Harvick	Richard Childress Racing	Chevrolet	500	263 (423.257)	3:32:41	74.195	Report	
2012	April 1	39	Ryan Newman	Stewart–Haas Racing	Chevrolet	515*	270.89 (435.955)	3:26:12	78.823	Report	
2013	April 7	48	Jimmie Johnson	Hendrick Motorsports	Chevrolet	500	263 (423.257)	3:38:58	72.066	Report	
2014	March 30	41	Kurt Busch	Stewart–Haas Racing	Chevrolet	500	263 (423.257)	3:38:38	72.176	Report	
2015	March 29	11	Denny Hamlin	Joe Gibbs Racing	Toyota	500	263 (423.257)	3:49:13	68.843	Report	
2016	April 3	18	Kyle Busch	Joe Gibbs Racing	Toyota	500	263 (423.257)	3:17:02	80.088	Report	
2017	April 2	2	Brad Keselowski	Team Penske	Ford	500	263 (423.257)	3:44:59	70.139	Report	
2018	March 26*	14	Clint Bowyer	Stewart–Haas Racing	Ford	500	263 (423.257)	3:13:14	81.663	Report	
2019	March 24	2	Brad Keselowski	Team Penske	Ford	500	263 (423.257)	3:21:54	78.158	Report	
2020	June 10*	19	Martin Truex Jr.	Joe Gibbs Racing	Toyota	500	263 (423.257)	3:23:56	77.378	Report	
2021	April 10–11*	19	Martin Truex Jr.	Joe Gibbs Racing	Toyota	500	263 (423.257)	3:54:25	67.316	Report	
2022*	April 9	24	William Byron	Hendrick Motorsports	Chevrolet	403*	211.978 (341.341)	2:40:30	79.244	Report	
2023	April 16	5	Kyle Larson	Hendrick Motorsports	Chevrolet	400	210.4 (338.606)	2:50:35	74.005	Report	
2024	April 7	24	William Byron	Hendrick Motorsports	Chevrolet	415*	218.29 (351.303)	2:52:07	76.096	Report	
2025	March 30	11	Denny Hamlin	Joe Gibbs Racing	Toyota	400	210.4 (338.606)	3:05:11	68.17	Report	
2026	March 29	9	Chase Elliott	Hendrick Motorsports	Chevrolet	400	210.4 (338.606)	2:47:18	75.457	Report	
2027	April 18									Report	

- 1957: Race shortened due to crash.
- 1961 (first): Race abandoned as a result of rain. Under current rules, it would not be declared official as less than 50% of the race distance was completed.
- 1961 (second): A replacement race for the original 1961 race.
- 1970, 1977, and 1995: Race shortened due to rain.
- 1974: Race shortened due to the 1973-74 energy crisis.
- 1998 and 2010: Race postponed from Sunday to Monday due to rain.
- 2010, 2012, 2022 and 2024: Race extended due to a NASCAR Overtime finish. 2012 took two attempts.
- 2018: Race postponed from Sunday to Monday due to snow.
- 2020: Race postponed from May 9 to June 10 due to the COVID-19 pandemic.
- 2021: Race started on Saturday night but finished on Sunday afternoon due to rain.
- 2022: Race length shortened to 400 laps.

Track length notes

- 1950–1969: 0.5 mile course
- 1970–1983: 0.525 mile course
- 1984–present: 0.526 mile course

=== Multiple winners (drivers) ===
Wins	Driver	Years won
9	Richard Petty	1960, 1962–1963, 1967, 1969, 1971–1972, 1975, 1979
5	Darrell Waltrip	1976, 1978, 1980, 1983, 1989
5	Rusty Wallace	1993–1996, 2004
4	Denny Hamlin	2008, 2010, 2015, 2025
3	Cale Yarborough	1968, 1974, 1977
3	Dale Earnhardt	1987–1988, 1991
3	Jeff Gordon	1997, 2003, 2005
3	Jimmie Johnson	2007, 2009, 2013
2	Curtis Turner	1950–1951
2	Buck Baker	1956–1957
2	Lee Petty	1953, 1959
2	Fred Lorenzen	1964–1965
2	Jim Paschal	1954, 1966
2	Harry Gant	1982, 1985
2	Geoff Bodine	1984, 1990
2	Mark Martin	1992, 2000
2	Brad Keselowski	2017, 2019
2	Martin Truex Jr.	2020–2021
2	William Byron	2022, 2024

=== Multiple winners (teams) ===
Wins	Team	Years won
12	Petty Enterprises	1953, 1959–1960, 1962–1963, 1967, 1969, 1971–1972, 1975, 1979, 1999
12	Hendrick Motorsports	1984, 1989, 1997, 2003, 2005, 2007, 2009, 2013, 2022–2024, 2026
9	Joe Gibbs Racing	2002, 2006, 2008, 2010, 2015–2016, 2020–2021, 2025
7	Team Penske	1993–1996, 2004, 2017, 2019
4	Richard Childress Racing	1987–1988, 1991, 2011
3	Holman-Moody	1961^{1}, 1964–1965
3	DiGard Motorsports	1976, 1978, 1980
3	Junior Johnson & Associates	1977, 1983, 1990
3	Stewart–Haas Racing	2012, 2014, 2018
2	John Eanes	1950–1951
2	Carl Kiekhaefer	1955–1956
2	Wood Brothers Racing	1968, 1973
2	Mach 1 Racing	1982, 1985
2	Roush Racing	1992, 2000

=== Multiple winners (manufacturers) ===
Wins	Manufacturer	Years won
30	Chevrolet	1957–1958, 1974, 1976–1980, 1983–1985, 1987–1989, 1991, 1997–1998, 2003, 2005–2007, 2009, 2011–2014, 2022–2024, 2026
14	Ford	1964–1965, 1969, 1986, 1990, 1992, 1994–1996, 2000–2001, 2017–2019
7	Plymouth	1960, 1962–1963, 1966–1967, 1971–1972
7	Toyota	2008, 2010, 2015–2016, 2020–2021, 2025
5	Pontiac	1961, 1981, 1993, 1999, 2002
5	Dodge	1953, 1956, 1970, 1975, 2004
4	Oldsmobile	1950–1951, 1954, 1959
2	Mercury	1968, 1973

Previous race: Food City 500	NASCAR Cup Series; Cook Out 400	Next race: Jack Link's 500
