= Cecil Gordon =

American racing driver (1941–2012)

- Born: Cecil Owen Gordon; June 21, 1941; Horse Shoe, North Carolina, U.S.
- Died: September 19, 2012 (aged 71); Lexington, North Carolina, U.S.

NASCAR Cup Series career
- 449 races run over 17 years
- Best finish: 3rd (1971, 1973)
- First race: 1968 Pickens 200 (Greenville-Pickens Speedway)
- Last race: 1985 Miller High Life 400 (Richmond)
Wins	Top tens	Poles
0	111	0

NASCAR Grand National East Series career
- 29 races run over 2 years
- Best finish: 29th (1973)
- First race: 1972 Greenville 200 (Greenville-Pickens Speedway)
- Last race: 1973 Tar Heel 200 (Fayetteville)
Wins	Top tens	Poles
2	21	0

Cecil Gordon (June 21, 1941 – September 19, 2012) was an American stock car racing driver. A competitor in the NASCAR Winston Cup Series between 1968 and 1985, he competed in 449 events without winning a race.

== NASCAR ==
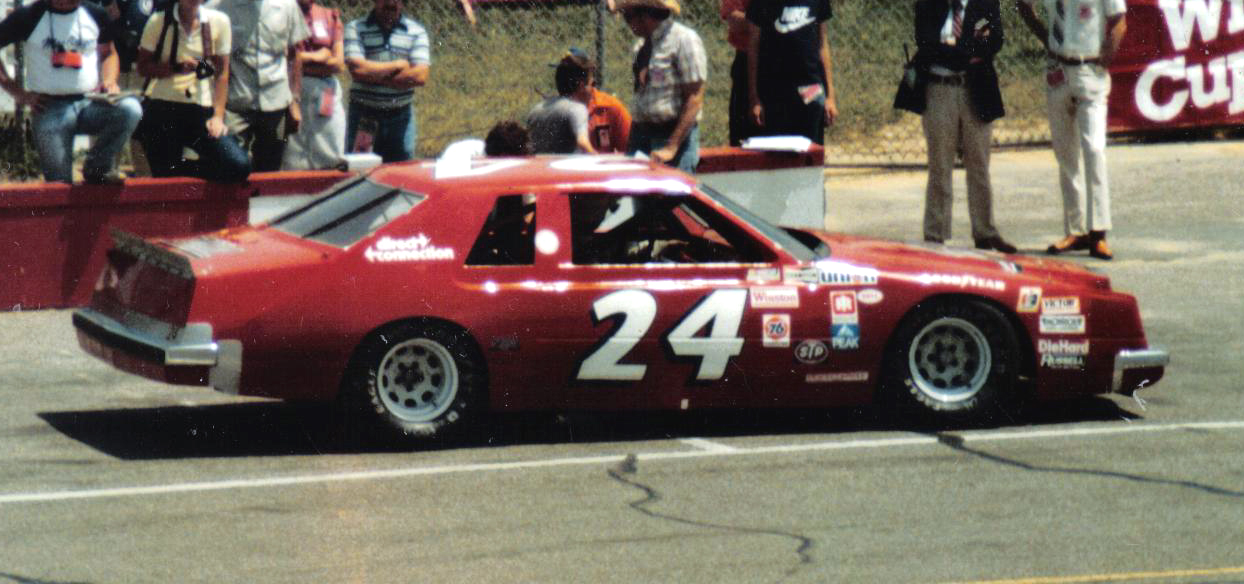
Gordon's 1983 Winston Cup car

=== Career as driver ===
Gordon drove in the NASCAR Grand National and Winston Cup Series for seventeen years and drove in a total of 449 races. He never won and never got a pole, he did not even finish a race on the lead lap, but got 29 top-fives and 111 top-tens. He finished third in points in 1971 and 1973. He completed 112,908 laps and only led 23 of them. By the end of his career, he had earned $940,000. His average finish for his entire career was 17.3. Racing Champions released a replica of 1969 Mercury Cyclone in 1992 and later in 1998 in honor of NASCAR's 50th anniversary.

=== Career as owner ===
Gordon started racing in Henley Gray and Bill Seifert cars. He generally raced in his own car beginning in 1970. He had a few other racers make an occasional start for him. He raced GM products (mostly Chevrolet vehicles) until the end of 1982 when he crashed out his Buick Regal. He purchased a Chrysler Imperial at the beginning of 1983 from the defunct Negre Bros. Racing team and managed to qualify for eight races during that season, though he only finished five of them. His best finish was fifteenth that year in the Imperial. He also had Jim VanDiver drive the car in two races. At the end of that year, he sold the Imperial to Buddy Arrington. Gordon returned for one more race in 1985 for the family-owned team of Greg Sacks.

=== Career as crewman ===
Following the end of his career as a driver and owner, Gordon worked for other racing teams as a crewman, first for Richard Childress Racing, and then later for Travis Carter Enterprises.

== Personal life ==
Gordon is not related to four-time NASCAR champion Jeff Gordon, yet, coincidentally, they both drove the No. 24 car.

Gordon, who was married with four children, Charlene (who died in 2006), Douglas, Stefanie and Jonathon. Gordon died on September 19, 2012, in Lexington, North Carolina.

== Motorsports career results ==
=== NASCAR ===
(key) (Bold – Pole position awarded by qualifying time. Italics – Pole position earned by points standings or practice time. * – Most laps led.)

==== Grand National Series ====
NASCAR Grand National Series results
Year	Team	No.	Make	1	2	3	4	5	6	7	8	9	10	11	12	13	14	15	16	17	18	19	20	21	22	23	24	25	26	27	28	29	30	31	32	33	34	35	36	37	38	39	40	41	42	43	44	45	46	47	48	49	50	51	52	53	54	NGNC	Pts	Ref
1968	Gray Racing	95	Ford	MGR	MGY	RSD	DAY	BRI	RCH	ATL	HCY	GPS	CLB	NWS	MAR	AUG	AWS	DAR	BLV	LGY	CLT	ASH	MGR	SMR	BIR	CAR	GPS; 19	DAY	ISP	OXF	FDA	TRN	BRI	SMR	NSV	ATL	CLB	BGS	AWS	SBO	LGY	DAR																55th	-	
1968	Gray Racing	19	Ford																																								HCY; 19	RCH; 17	BLV; 13	HBO; 20												55th	-	
1968	Seifert Racing	47	Ford																																												MAR; 38	NWS; 27	AUG									55th	-	
1968	Seifert Racing	45	Ford																																															CLT; 28	CAR	JFC; 19						55th	-	
1969	Seifert Racing	45	Ford	MGR; 11				DAY; 11																																																		10th	3002	
1969	Seifert Racing	47	Ford		MGY; 9	RSD	DAY		DAY; 27	CAR; 32	AUG; 18	BRI; DNQ	ATL; 18	CLB; 22	HCY; 15	GPS; 14	RCH; 21		MAR; 35	AWS; 12	DAR; 18	BLV; 17	LGY; 24	CLT; 21	MGR; 21	SMR; 18	MCH; 16	KPT; 17	GPS; 18	NCF; 21	DAY; 38	DOV; 10	TPN; 15	TRN; 17	BLV; 11	BRI; 5	NSV; 16	SMR; 6	ATL; 16	MCH; 26	SBO; 11	BGS; 21	AWS; 9	DAR; 18	HCY; 14	RCH; 7	TAL; DNQ	CLB; 9	MAR; 13	NWS; 15	CLT; 19	SVH; 19	AUG; 11	CAR; 14	JFC; 12	MGR; 7	TWS; 11	10th	3002	
1969	Larry Wehrs	00	Chevy									BRI; 25																																														10th	3002	
1969	Wayne Smith	33	Chevy															NWS; 17																																								10th	3002	
1970	Gordon Racing	24	Ford	RSD	DAY	DAY; 15	DAY; 40	RCH; 19	CAR; 12	SVH; 12	ATL; 35	BRI; 8	TAL; 21	NWS; 9	CLB; 27	DAR; 29	BLV; 17	LGY; 18	CLT; 37	SMR; 8	MAR; 10	MCH; 32	RSD	HCY; 22	KPT; 12	GPS; 26	DAY; 19	AST; 13	TPN; 17	TRN; 35	BRI; 10	SMR; 10	NSV; 4	ATL; 37	CLB; 24	ONA; 6	MCH; 40	TAL; 21	BGS; 18	SBO; 11	DAR; 22	HCY	RCH; 13	DOV; 10		NWS; 14	CLT; 17	MAR; 26	MGR; 10	CAR; 21	LGY; 24							11th	2514	
1970	Gordon Racing	97	Ford																																										NCF; 5													11th	2514	
1971	Gordon Racing	24	Ford	RSD; 10				ONT; 19	RCH; 9																																																	3rd	3677	
1971	Gordon Racing	24	Mercury		DAY; 10	DAY	DAY; 17			CAR; 13	HCY; 11	BRI; 14	ATL; 17	CLB; 11	GPS; 12	SMR; 9	NWS; 10	MAR; 7	DAR; 15	SBO; 5	TAL; 13	ASH; 3	KPT; 4	CLT; 17	DOV; 28	MCH; 19	RSD; 3	HOU; 6	GPS; 9	DAY; 17	BRI; 4	AST; 8	ISP; 8	TRN; 11	NSV; 16	ATL; 12	BGS; 24	ONA; 5	MCH; 6	TAL; 38	CLB; 13	HCY; 12	DAR; 9	MAR; 12	CLT; 15	DOV; 11	CAR; 11	MGR	RCH; 9	NWS; 9	TWS; 7							3rd	3677	

==== Winston Cup Series ====
NASCAR Winston Cup Series results
Year	Team	No.	Make	1	2	3	4	5	6	7	8	9	10	11	12	13	14	15	16	17	18	19	20	21	22	23	24	25	26	27	28	29	30	31	NWCC	Pts	Ref
1972	Gordon Racing	24	Mercury	RSD; 10	DAY; 39	RCH; 9	ONT; 36		ATL; 17	BRI; 5	DAR; 10	NWS; 18	MAR; 4	TAL; 14	CLT; 8	DOV; 8	MCH; 11	RSD; 8	TWS; 15	DAY; 11	BRI; 8	TRN; 5	ATL; 9	TAL; 43	MCH; 15	NSV; 6	DAR; 28	RCH; 20	DOV; 5	MAR; 10	NWS; 7	CLT; 17	CAR; 20	TWS; 8	4th	7326.05	
1972	Gordon Racing	24	Ford					CAR; 26																											4th	7326.05	
1973	Gordon Racing	24	Chevy	RSD; 20	DAY; 21	RCH; 8	CAR; 22	BRI; 29	ATL; 8	NWS; 5	DAR; 21	MAR; 5	TAL; 5	NSV; 4	CLT; 8	DOV; 5	TWS; 5	RSD; 5	MCH; 8	DAY; 13	BRI; 3	ATL; 24	TAL; 8	NSV; 8	DAR; 11	RCH; 7	DOV; 27	NWS; 9	MAR; 7	CLT; 9	CAR; 11				3rd	7046.8	
1974	Gordon Racing	24	Chevy	RSD; 8	DAY; 13	RCH; 11	CAR; 29	BRI; 6	ATL; 34	DAR; 11	NWS; 11	MAR; 15	TAL; 21	NSV; 25	DOV; 27	CLT; 28	RSD; 4	MCH; 10	DAY; 10	BRI; 6	NSV; 20	ATL; 10	POC; 7	TAL; 15	MCH; 12	DAR; 19	RCH; 9	DOV; 7	NWS; 27	MAR; 26	CLT; 15	CAR; 21	ONT; 29		9th	1000.65	
1975	Gordon Racing	24	Chevy	RSD; 3	DAY; 15	RCH; 7	CAR; 20	BRI; 4	ATL; 8	NWS; 9	DAR; 21	MAR; 23	TAL; 21	NSV; 5	DOV; 2	CLT; 37	RSD; 18	MCH; 33	DAY; 29	NSV; 5	POC; 10	TAL; 10	MCH; 13	DAR; 6	DOV; 29	NWS; 16	MAR; 9	CLT; 5	RCH; 4	CAR; 30	BRI; 8	ATL; 9	ONT; 19		6th	3702	
1976	Gordon Racing	24	Chevy	RSD; 23	DAY; 18	CAR; 34	RCH; 7	BRI; 28	ATL; 16	NWS; 12	DAR; 11	MAR; 10	TAL; 6	NSV; 14	DOV; 36		RSD; 12	MCH; 10	DAY; 34		POC; 6	TAL; 29	MCH; 26	BRI; 21	DAR; 12	RCH; 13	DOV; 35	MAR; 15	NWS; 13	CLT; 28	CAR; 15	ATL; 23	ONT; 16		15th	3247	
1976	Gray Racing	19	Chevy													CLT; 20																			15th	3247	
1976	Dalton Racing	7	Chevy																	NSV; 15															15th	3247	
1977	Gordon Racing	24	Chevy	RSD; 11	DAY; 17	RCH; 13	CAR; 10	ATL; 16	NWS; 13	DAR; 12	BRI; 17	MAR; 13	TAL; 16	NSV; 13	DOV; 12	CLT; 22	RSD; 9	MCH; 21	DAY; 11	NSV; 20	POC; 21	TAL; 16	MCH; 19	BRI; 29	DAR; 19	RCH; 17	DOV; 21	MAR; 18	NWS; 15	CLT; 37	CAR; 23	ATL; 20	ONT; 32		10th	3294	
1978	Gordon Racing	24	Chevy	RSD; 25	DAY; 21	RCH; 17	CAR; 22	ATL; 17	BRI; 18	DAR; 33	NWS; 17	MAR; 9	TAL; 25	DOV; 25	CLT	NSV; 19	RSD; 12	MCH; 17	DAY; 32	NSV; 19	POC; 40	TAL	MCH; 17	BRI; 13	DAR	RCH; 17	DOV; 14	MAR; 30			CAR; 15	ATL; 18	ONT; 15		19th	2641	
1978	Hollar Racing	29	Chevy																										NWS; 26	CLT					19th	2641	
1979	Gordon Racing	24	Olds	RSD; 25	DAY; DNQ	CAR; 11	RCH; 25	ATL; 23	NWS; 22	BRI; 15	DAR; 31	MAR; 17	TAL; 11	NSV	DOV; 23	CLT; 17	TWS; 21	RSD; 11	MCH	DAY; 35	NSV; 11	POC; 18	TAL; 40	MCH; 18	BRI; 22	DAR; 26	RCH; 18	DOV; 20	MAR; 24			CAR; 13	ATL; 38	ONT; 24	19th	2737	
1979	Gray Racing	19	Chevy																											CLT; 32	NWS; 18				19th	2737	
1980	Gordon Racing	24	Olds	RSD	DAY; 21	RCH; 8	CAR; 33	ATL; 24	BRI; 22			MAR; 17	TAL; 23	NSV; 19	DOV; 9	CLT; 37	TWS; 14	RSD; 10	MCH; 20	DAY; 29		POC; 16	TAL; 23	MCH; 21	BRI; 19	DAR; 19	RCH; 18	DOV; 15	NWS; 14	MAR; 13	CLT; 24	CAR; 15	ATL; DNQ	ONT; 17	15th	2993	
1980	Negre Racing	82	Chrysler							DAR; 34	NWS																								15th	2993	
1980	Oswald Racing	09	Buick																		NSV; 21														15th	2993	
1980	Gray Racing	19	Chevy																														ATL; 25		15th	2993	
1981	Gordon Racing	24	Olds	RSD; 36																															23rd	2320	
1981	Gordon Racing	24	Buick		DAY; 37	RCH; 19	CAR; 23	ATL; 37	BRI; 21		DAR; 21	MAR; 24	TAL; 15		DOV; 15	CLT	TWS; 18	RSD; 13		DAY; 25		POC; 21	TAL; 17	MCH; 24								CAR; 15	ATL	RSD	23rd	2320	
1981	Jimmy Means Racing	53	Buick							NWS; 31																									23rd	2320	
1981	Gordon Racing	24	Pontiac											NSV; 19																					23rd	2320	
1981	Gray Racing	19	Buick																MCH; 27																23rd	2320	
1981	Wawak Racing	94	Buick																		NSV; 29														23rd	2320	
1981	Ulrich Racing	40	Buick																						BRI; 30	DAR	RCH; 23			NWS; 19	CLT				23rd	2320	
1981	Newsom Racing	20	Chevy																									DOV; 26	MAR						23rd	2320	
1982	Gordon Racing	24	Buick	DAY	RCH	BRI; DNQ	ATL	CAR	DAR	NWS	MAR	TAL	NSV	DOV	CLT	POC	RSD	MCH	DAY	NSV	POC; 14	TAL	MCH	BRI	DAR	RCH	DOV; 16	NWS; 18	CLT	MAR	CAR	ATL; DNQ	RSD; 17		82nd	-	
1983	Gordon Racing	24	Chrysler	DAY	RCH; DNQ	CAR	ATL	DAR	NWS; DNQ	MAR	TAL; 16	NSV	DOV; 21	BRI	CLT	RSD	POC; 23	MCH	DAY; 22	NSV	POC; 23	TAL; 33	MCH	BRI	DAR	RCH	DOV; 15	MAR	NWS	CLT	CAR	ATL	RSD		40th	649	
1985	Sacks & Sons	51	Chevy	DAY	RCH; 30	CAR	ATL	BRI	DAR	NWS	MAR	TAL	DOV	CLT	RSD	POC	MCH	DAY	POC	TAL	MCH	BRI	DAR	RCH	DOV	MAR	NWS	CLT	CAR	ATL	RSD				NA	0	

===== Daytona 500 =====
Year	Team	Manufacturer	Start	Finish
1969	Seifert Racing	Ford	34	27
1970	Gordon Racing	Ford	30	40
1971	Gordon Racing	Mercury	19	17
1972	Gordon Racing	Mercury	11	39
1973	Gordon Racing	Chevrolet	31	21
1974	Gordon Racing	Chevrolet	32	13
1975	Gordon Racing	Chevrolet	15	15
1976	Gordon Racing	Chevrolet	17	18
1977	Gordon Racing	Chevrolet	41	17
1978	Gordon Racing	Chevrolet	41	21
1979	Gordon Racing	Oldsmobile	DNQ	
1980	Gordon Racing	Oldsmobile	19	21
1981	Gordon Racing	Buick	42	37
