= 1997 Food City 500 =

Seventh race of the 1997 NASCAR Winston Cup Series

Race details
- Race 7 of 32 in the 1997 NASCAR Winston Cup Series
- The 1997 Food City 500 program cover, featuring Dale Earnhardt. Artwork by Sam Bass.
- Date: April 13, 1997
- Official name: 37th Annual Food City 500
- Location: Bristol, Tennessee, Bristol Motor Speedway
- Course: Permanent racing facility
- Course length: 0.533 miles (0.858 km)
- Distance: 500 laps, 266.5 mi (428.89 km)
- Average speed: 75.035 miles per hour (120.757 km/h)

Pole position
| Driver | Rusty Wallace | Penske Racing South |
- Time: 15.526

Most laps led
| Driver | Rusty Wallace | Penske Racing South |
- Laps: 240

Winner
| No. 24 | Jeff Gordon | Hendrick Motorsports |

Television in the United States
- Network: ESPN
- Announcers: Jerry Punch, Ned Jarrett & Benny Parsons

Radio in the United States
- Radio: Performance Racing Network

The 1997 Food City 500 was the seventh stock car race of the 1997 NASCAR Winston Cup Series and the 37th iteration of the event. The race was held on Sunday, April 13, 1997, in Bristol, Tennessee at Bristol Motor Speedway, a 0.533 miles (0.858 km) permanent oval-shaped racetrack. The race took the scheduled 500 laps to complete. On the final lap of the race, Hendrick Motorsports driver Jeff Gordon would manage to complete a bump-and-run on Penske Racing South driver Rusty Wallace in the final two turns to take his 22nd career NASCAR Winston Cup Series victory and his third victory of the season. To fill out the top three, Wallace and Hendrick Motorsports driver Terry Labonte would finish second and third, respectively.

== Background ==
The layout of Bristol Motor Speedway, the venue where the race was held.

Bristol Motor Speedway is a NASCAR short track venue located in Bristol, Tennessee. Constructed in 1960, it held its first NASCAR race on July 30, 1961. Despite its short length, Bristol is among the most popular tracks on the NASCAR schedule because of its distinct features, which include extraordinarily steep banking, an all concrete surface, two pit roads, and stadium-like seating. It has also been named one of the loudest NASCAR tracks.

=== Entry list ===
- (R) denotes rookie driver.

| # | Driver | Team | Make |
|---|---|---|---|
| 1 | Morgan Shepherd | Precision Products Racing | Pontiac |
| 2 | Rusty Wallace | Penske Racing South | Ford |
| 3 | Dale Earnhardt | Richard Childress Racing | Chevrolet |
| 4 | Sterling Marlin | Morgan–McClure Motorsports | Chevrolet |
| 5 | Terry Labonte | Hendrick Motorsports | Chevrolet |
| 6 | Mark Martin | Roush Racing | Ford |
| 7 | Geoff Bodine | Mattei Motorsports | Ford |
| 8 | Hut Stricklin | Stavola Brothers Racing | Ford |
| 9 | Lake Speed | Melling Racing | Ford |
| 10 | Ricky Rudd | Rudd Performance Motorsports | Ford |
| 11 | Brett Bodine | Brett Bodine Racing | Ford |
| 16 | Ted Musgrave | Roush Racing | Ford |
| 17 | Darrell Waltrip | Darrell Waltrip Motorsports | Chevrolet |
| 18 | Bobby Labonte | Joe Gibbs Racing | Pontiac |
| 19 | Gary Bradberry | TriStar Motorsports | Ford |
| 20 | Greg Sacks | Ranier-Walsh Racing | Ford |
| 21 | Michael Waltrip | Wood Brothers Racing | Ford |
| 22 | Ward Burton | Bill Davis Racing | Pontiac |
| 23 | Jimmy Spencer | Haas-Carter Motorsports | Ford |
| 24 | Jeff Gordon | Hendrick Motorsports | Chevrolet |
| 25 | Jack Sprague | Hendrick Motorsports | Chevrolet |
| 28 | Ernie Irvan | Robert Yates Racing | Ford |
| 29 | Robert Pressley | Diamond Ridge Motorsports | Chevrolet |
| 30 | Johnny Benson Jr. | Bahari Racing | Pontiac |
| 31 | Mike Skinner (R) | Richard Childress Racing | Chevrolet |
| 33 | Ken Schrader | Andy Petree Racing | Chevrolet |
| 36 | Derrike Cope | MB2 Motorsports | Pontiac |
| 37 | Jeremy Mayfield | Kranefuss-Haas Racing | Ford |
| 40 | Robby Gordon (R) | Team SABCO | Chevrolet |
| 41 | Steve Grissom | Larry Hedrick Motorsports | Chevrolet |
| 42 | Joe Nemechek | Team SABCO | Chevrolet |
| 43 | Bobby Hamilton | Petty Enterprises | Pontiac |
| 44 | Kyle Petty | Petty Enterprises | Pontiac |
| 71 | Dave Marcis | Marcis Auto Racing | Chevrolet |
| 75 | Rick Mast | Butch Mock Motorsports | Ford |
| 77 | Bobby Hillin Jr. | Jasper Motorsports | Ford |
| 78 | Billy Standridge | Triad Motorsports | Ford |
| 81 | Kenny Wallace | FILMAR Racing | Ford |
| 88 | Dale Jarrett | Robert Yates Racing | Ford |
| 90 | Dick Trickle | Donlavey Racing | Ford |
| 91 | Mike Wallace | LJ Racing | Chevrolet |
| 94 | Bill Elliott | Bill Elliott Racing | Ford |
| 95 | Ed Berrier | Sadler Brothers Racing | Chevrolet |
| 96 | David Green (R) | American Equipment Racing | Chevrolet |
| 97 | Chad Little | Mark Rypien Motorsports | Pontiac |
| 98 | John Andretti | Cale Yarborough Motorsports | Ford |
| 99 | Jeff Burton | Roush Racing | Ford |

== Qualifying ==
Qualifying was split into two rounds. The first round was held on Friday, March 21, at 3:00 PM EST. Each driver would have one lap to set a time. During the first round, the top 25 drivers in the round would be guaranteed a starting spot in the race. If a driver was not able to guarantee a spot in the first round, they had the option to scrub their time from the first round and try and run a faster lap time in a second round qualifying run, held on Saturday, March 22, at 12:30 PM EST. As with the first round, each driver would have one lap to set a time. Positions 26-38 would be decided on time, while positions 39-43 would be based on provisionals. Four spots are awarded by the use of provisionals based on owner's points. The fifth is awarded to a past champion who has not otherwise qualified for the race. If no past champion needs the provisional, the next team in the owner points will be awarded a provisional.

Rusty Wallace, driving for Penske Racing South, would win the pole, setting a time of 15.526 and an average speed of 123.586 miles per hour (198.892 km/h).

Four drivers would fail to qualify: Bobby Hillin Jr., Billy Standridge, Mike Wallace, and Greg Sacks.

=== Full qualifying results ===
| Pos. | # | Driver | Team | Make | Time | Speed |
|---|---|---|---|---|---|---|
| 1 | 2 | Rusty Wallace | Penske Racing South | Ford | 15.526 | 123.586 |
| 2 | 4 | Sterling Marlin | Morgan–McClure Motorsports | Chevrolet | 15.548 | 123.411 |
| 3 | 16 | Ted Musgrave | Roush Racing | Ford | 15.581 | 123.150 |
| 4 | 81 | Kenny Wallace | FILMAR Racing | Ford | 15.583 | 123.134 |
| 5 | 24 | Jeff Gordon | Hendrick Motorsports | Chevrolet | 15.611 | 122.913 |
| 6 | 88 | Dale Jarrett | Robert Yates Racing | Ford | 15.626 | 122.795 |
| 7 | 8 | Hut Stricklin | Stavola Brothers Racing | Ford | 15.648 | 122.623 |
| 8 | 7 | Geoff Bodine | Geoff Bodine Racing | Ford | 15.654 | 122.576 |
| 9 | 41 | Steve Grissom | Larry Hedrick Motorsports | Chevrolet | 15.670 | 122.451 |
| 10 | 23 | Jimmy Spencer | Travis Carter Enterprises | Ford | 15.680 | 122.372 |
| 11 | 99 | Jeff Burton | Roush Racing | Ford | 15.697 | 122.240 |
| 12 | 11 | Brett Bodine | Brett Bodine Racing | Ford | 15.713 | 122.115 |
| 13 | 18 | Bobby Labonte | Joe Gibbs Racing | Pontiac | 15.715 | 122.100 |
| 14 | 44 | Kyle Petty | Petty Enterprises | Pontiac | 15.740 | 121.906 |
| 15 | 29 | Robert Pressley | Diamond Ridge Motorsports | Chevrolet | 15.752 | 121.813 |
| 16 | 33 | Ken Schrader | Andy Petree Racing | Chevrolet | 15.757 | 121.774 |
| 17 | 5 | Terry Labonte | Hendrick Motorsports | Chevrolet | 15.758 | 121.767 |
| 18 | 94 | Bill Elliott | Bill Elliott Racing | Ford | 15.762 | 121.736 |
| 19 | 90 | Dick Trickle | Donlavey Racing | Ford | 15.772 | 121.659 |
| 20 | 40 | Robby Gordon (R) | Team SABCO | Chevrolet | 15.781 | 121.589 |
| 21 | 97 | Chad Little | Mark Rypien Motorsports | Pontiac | 15.790 | 121.520 |
| 22 | 10 | Ricky Rudd | Rudd Performance Motorsports | Ford | 15.798 | 121.405 |
| 23 | 6 | Mark Martin | Roush Racing | Ford | 15.799 | 121.405 |
| 24 | 42 | Joe Nemechek | Team SABCO | Chevrolet | 15.805 | 121.405 |
| 25 | 75 | Rick Mast | Butch Mock Motorsports | Ford | 15.824 | 121.259 |
| 26 | 98 | John Andretti | Cale Yarborough Motorsports | Ford | 15.828 | 121.228 |
| 27 | 96 | David Green (R) | American Equipment Racing | Chevrolet | 15.828 | 121.228 |
| 28 | 31 | Mike Skinner (R) | Richard Childress Racing | Chevrolet | 15.837 | 121.159 |
| 29 | 3 | Dale Earnhardt | Richard Childress Racing | Chevrolet | 15.845 | 121.098 |
| 30 | 95 | Ed Berrier | Sadler Brothers Racing | Chevrolet | 15.859 | 120.991 |
| 31 | 9 | Lake Speed | Melling Racing | Ford | 15.867 | 120.930 |
| 32 | 37 | Jeremy Mayfield | Kranefuss-Haas Racing | Ford | 15.882 | 120.816 |
| 33 | 30 | Johnny Benson Jr. | Bahari Racing | Pontiac | 15.888 | 120.770 |
| 34 | 43 | Bobby Hamilton | Petty Enterprises | Pontiac | 15.891 | 120.748 |
| 35 | 22 | Ward Burton | Bill Davis Racing | Pontiac | 15.892 | 120.740 |
| 36 | 36 | Derrike Cope | MB2 Motorsports | Pontiac | 15.899 | 120.687 |
| 37 | 19 | Gary Bradberry | TriStar Motorsports | Ford | 15.906 | 120.634 |
| 38 | 28 | Ernie Irvan | Robert Yates Racing | Ford | 15.907 | 120.626 |
Provisionals
| 39 | 21 | Michael Waltrip | Wood Brothers Racing | Ford | - | - |
| 40 | 25 | Jack Sprague | Hendrick Motorsports | Chevrolet | - | - |
| 41 | 1 | Morgan Shepherd | Precision Products Racing | Pontiac | - | - |
| 42 | 71 | Dave Marcis | Marcis Auto Racing | Chevrolet | - | - |
| 43 | 17 | Darrell Waltrip | Darrell Waltrip Motorsports | Chevrolet | - | - |
Failed to qualify
| 44 | 77 | Bobby Hillin Jr. | Jasper Motorsports | Ford | -* | -* |
| 45 | 78 | Billy Standridge | Triad Motorsports | Ford | -* | -* |
| 46 | 91 | Mike Wallace | LJ Racing | Chevrolet | -* | -* |
| 47 | 20 | Greg Sacks | Ranier-Walsh Racing | Ford | -* | -* |
Official qualifying results

== Race results ==
| Fin | St | # | Driver | Team | Make | Laps | Led | Status | Pts | Winnings |
|---|---|---|---|---|---|---|---|---|---|---|
| 1 | 5 | 24 | Jeff Gordon | Hendrick Motorsports | Chevrolet | 500 | 125 | running | 180 | $83,640 |
| 2 | 1 | 2 | Rusty Wallace | Penske Racing South | Ford | 500 | 240 | running | 180 | $64,090 |
| 3 | 17 | 5 | Terry Labonte | Hendrick Motorsports | Chevrolet | 500 | 0 | running | 165 | $51,490 |
| 4 | 6 | 88 | Dale Jarrett | Robert Yates Racing | Ford | 500 | 0 | running | 160 | $39,265 |
| 5 | 23 | 6 | Mark Martin | Roush Racing | Ford | 500 | 0 | running | 155 | $37,520 |
| 6 | 29 | 3 | Dale Earnhardt | Richard Childress Racing | Chevrolet | 500 | 0 | running | 150 | $32,970 |
| 7 | 18 | 94 | Bill Elliott | Bill Elliott Racing | Ford | 500 | 90 | running | 151 | $27,770 |
| 8 | 21 | 97 | Chad Little | Mark Rypien Motorsports | Pontiac | 500 | 0 | running | 142 | $18,370 |
| 9 | 32 | 37 | Jeremy Mayfield | Kranefuss-Haas Racing | Ford | 500 | 0 | running | 138 | $21,565 |
| 10 | 12 | 11 | Brett Bodine | Brett Bodine Racing | Ford | 500 | 0 | running | 134 | $28,215 |
| 11 | 19 | 90 | Dick Trickle | Donlavey Racing | Ford | 500 | 0 | running | 130 | $18,745 |
| 12 | 16 | 33 | Ken Schrader | Andy Petree Racing | Chevrolet | 500 | 0 | running | 127 | $25,390 |
| 13 | 34 | 43 | Bobby Hamilton | Petty Enterprises | Pontiac | 500 | 0 | running | 124 | $29,015 |
| 14 | 15 | 29 | Robert Pressley | Diamond Ridge Motorsports | Chevrolet | 500 | 2 | running | 126 | $17,965 |
| 15 | 10 | 23 | Jimmy Spencer | Travis Carter Enterprises | Ford | 499 | 36 | running | 123 | $25,965 |
| 16 | 36 | 36 | Derrike Cope | MB2 Motorsports | Pontiac | 499 | 0 | running | 115 | $13,640 |
| 17 | 25 | 75 | Rick Mast | Butch Mock Motorsports | Ford | 499 | 0 | running | 112 | $24,390 |
| 18 | 35 | 22 | Ward Burton | Bill Davis Racing | Pontiac | 499 | 0 | running | 109 | $17,240 |
| 19 | 24 | 42 | Joe Nemechek | Team SABCO | Chevrolet | 499 | 0 | running | 106 | $17,130 |
| 20 | 2 | 4 | Sterling Marlin | Morgan–McClure Motorsports | Chevrolet | 498 | 7 | running | 108 | $32,421 |
| 21 | 39 | 21 | Michael Waltrip | Wood Brothers Racing | Ford | 497 | 0 | running | 100 | $23,765 |
| 22 | 27 | 96 | David Green (R) | American Equipment Racing | Chevrolet | 496 | 0 | running | 97 | $14,215 |
| 23 | 30 | 95 | Ed Berrier | Sadler Brothers Racing | Chevrolet | 495 | 0 | running | 94 | $13,165 |
| 24 | 26 | 98 | John Andretti | Cale Yarborough Motorsports | Ford | 491 | 0 | running | 91 | $23,490 |
| 25 | 43 | 17 | Darrell Waltrip | Darrell Waltrip Motorsports | Chevrolet | 485 | 0 | running | 88 | $23,595 |
| 26 | 7 | 8 | Hut Stricklin | Stavola Brothers Racing | Ford | 484 | 0 | running | 85 | $23,215 |
| 27 | 22 | 10 | Ricky Rudd | Rudd Performance Motorsports | Ford | 483 | 0 | running | 82 | $27,991 |
| 28 | 41 | 1 | Morgan Shepherd | Precision Products Racing | Pontiac | 479 | 0 | running | 79 | $23,040 |
| 29 | 14 | 44 | Kyle Petty | Petty Enterprises | Pontiac | 477 | 0 | running | 76 | $12,910 |
| 30 | 42 | 71 | Dave Marcis | Marcis Auto Racing | Chevrolet | 468 | 0 | running | 73 | $15,585 |
| 31 | 33 | 30 | Johnny Benson Jr. | Bahari Racing | Pontiac | 455 | 0 | running | 70 | $21,815 |
| 32 | 9 | 41 | Steve Grissom | Larry Hedrick Motorsports | Chevrolet | 441 | 0 | crash | 67 | $22,795 |
| 33 | 8 | 7 | Geoff Bodine | Geoff Bodine Racing | Ford | 432 | 0 | crash | 64 | $18,775 |
| 34 | 13 | 18 | Bobby Labonte | Joe Gibbs Racing | Pontiac | 425 | 0 | running | 61 | $26,735 |
| 35 | 28 | 31 | Mike Skinner (R) | Richard Childress Racing | Chevrolet | 365 | 0 | engine | 58 | $11,715 |
| 36 | 31 | 9 | Lake Speed | Melling Racing | Ford | 325 | 0 | crash | 55 | $18,695 |
| 37 | 37 | 19 | Gary Bradberry | TriStar Motorsports | Ford | 317 | 0 | running | 52 | $11,675 |
| 38 | 3 | 16 | Ted Musgrave | Roush Racing | Ford | 296 | 0 | crash | 49 | $18,950 |
| 39 | 38 | 28 | Ernie Irvan | Robert Yates Racing | Ford | 281 | 0 | engine | 46 | $26,650 |
| 40 | 40 | 25 | Jack Sprague | Hendrick Motorsports | Chevrolet | 256 | 0 | crash | 43 | $18,650 |
| 41 | 4 | 81 | Kenny Wallace | FILMAR Racing | Ford | 223 | 0 | crash | 40 | $18,750 |
| 42 | 11 | 99 | Jeff Burton | Roush Racing | Ford | 157 | 0 | engine | 37 | $26,650 |
| 43 | 20 | 40 | Robby Gordon (R) | Team SABCO | Chevrolet | 91 | 0 | crash | 34 | $18,650 |
Official race results

== Media ==
=== Television ===
The race was aired live on ESPN in the United States. Jerry Punch, two-time Cup Series champion Ned Jarrett and 1973 Cup Series champion Benny Parsons called the race from the broadcast booth. Punch filled in for regular commentator Bob Jenkins who missed the race after undergoing back surgery three weeks prior. Bill Weber, John Kernan and Ray Dunlap handled pit road for the television side.

ESPN
| Booth announcers | | Pit reporters |
| Lap-by-lap | Color-commentators | Pit reporters |
|---|---|---|
| Jerry Punch | Ned Jarrett; Benny Parsons | Bill Weber; John Kernan; Ray Dunlap |

| Previous race: 1997 Interstate Batteries 500 | NASCAR Winston Cup Series; 1997 season | Next race: 1997 Goody's Headache Powder 500 (Martinsville) |
