= 1997 Goody's Headache Powder 500 (Martinsville) =

Eighth race of the 1997 NASCAR Winston Cup Series

Race details
- Race 8 of 32 in the 1997 NASCAR Winston Cup Series
- The 1997 Goody's Headache Powder 500 program cover, celebrating the track's 50th anniversary.
- Date: April 20, 1997
- Official name: 48th Annual Goody's Headache Powder 500
- Location: Martinsville, Virginia, Martinsville Speedway
- Course: Permanent racing facility
- Course length: 0.526 miles (0.847 km)
- Distance: 500 laps, 263 mi (423.257 km)
- Average speed: 70.347 miles per hour (113.213 km/h)

Pole position
Driver	Kenny Wallace	FILMAR Racing
- Time: 20.153

Most laps led
Driver	Jeff Gordon	Hendrick Motorsports
- Laps: 431

Winner
No. 24	Jeff Gordon	Hendrick Motorsports

Television in the United States
- Network: ESPN
- Announcers: Bob Jenkins, Ned Jarrett, Benny Parsons

Radio in the United States
- Radio: Motor Racing Network

The 1997 Goody's Headache Powder 500 was the eighth stock car race of the 1997 NASCAR Winston Cup Series and the 48th iteration of the event. The race was held on Sunday, April 20, 1997, in Martinsville, Virginia at Martinsville Speedway, a 0.526 miles (0.847 km) permanent oval-shaped short track. The race took the scheduled 500 laps to complete. At race's end, Hendrick Motorsports driver Jeff Gordon would dominate the majority of the race, recovering from a mid-race spin to take his 23rd career NASCAR Winston Cup Series victory, his fourth victory of the season, and his second consecutive victory. To fill out the top three, Petty Enterprises driver Bobby Hamilton and Roush Racing driver Mark Martin would finish second and third, respectively.

== Background ==
The layout of Martinsville Speedway, the venue where the race was held.

Martinsville Speedway is a NASCAR-owned stock car racing track located in Henry County, in Ridgeway, Virginia, just to the south of Martinsville. At 0.526 miles (0.847 km) in length, it is the shortest track in the NASCAR Cup Series. The track was also one of the first paved oval tracks in NASCAR, being built in 1947 by H. Clay Earles. It is also the only remaining race track that has been on the NASCAR circuit from its beginning in 1948.

=== Entry list ===
- (R) denotes rookie driver.

#	Driver	Team	Make
1	Morgan Shepherd	Precision Products Racing	Pontiac
2	Rusty Wallace	Penske Racing South	Ford
3	Dale Earnhardt	Richard Childress Racing	Chevrolet
4	Sterling Marlin	Morgan–McClure Motorsports	Chevrolet
5	Terry Labonte	Hendrick Motorsports	Chevrolet
6	Mark Martin	Roush Racing	Ford
7	Geoff Bodine	Mattei Motorsports	Ford
8	Hut Stricklin	Stavola Brothers Racing	Ford
9	Lake Speed	Melling Racing	Ford
10	Ricky Rudd	Rudd Performance Motorsports	Ford
11	Brett Bodine	Brett Bodine Racing	Ford
16	Ted Musgrave	Roush Racing	Ford
17	Darrell Waltrip	Darrell Waltrip Motorsports	Chevrolet
18	Bobby Labonte	Joe Gibbs Racing	Pontiac
19	Gary Bradberry	TriStar Motorsports	Ford
20	Lance Hooper	Ranier-Walsh Racing	Ford
21	Michael Waltrip	Wood Brothers Racing	Ford
22	Ward Burton	Bill Davis Racing	Pontiac
23	Jimmy Spencer	Haas-Carter Motorsports	Ford
24	Jeff Gordon	Hendrick Motorsports	Chevrolet
25	Ricky Craven	Hendrick Motorsports	Chevrolet
28	Ernie Irvan	Robert Yates Racing	Ford
29	Robert Pressley	Diamond Ridge Motorsports	Chevrolet
30	Johnny Benson Jr.	Bahari Racing	Pontiac
31	Mike Skinner (R)	Richard Childress Racing	Chevrolet
33	Ken Schrader	Andy Petree Racing	Chevrolet
36	Derrike Cope	MB2 Motorsports	Pontiac
37	Jeremy Mayfield	Kranefuss-Haas Racing	Ford
40	Robby Gordon (R)	Team SABCO	Chevrolet
41	Steve Grissom	Larry Hedrick Motorsports	Chevrolet
42	Joe Nemechek	Team SABCO	Chevrolet
43	Bobby Hamilton	Petty Enterprises	Pontiac
44	Kyle Petty	Petty Enterprises	Pontiac
71	Dave Marcis	Marcis Auto Racing	Chevrolet
75	Rick Mast	Butch Mock Motorsports	Ford
77	Bobby Hillin Jr.	Jasper Motorsports	Ford
78	Billy Standridge	Triad Motorsports	Ford
79	Randy MacDonald	T.R.I.X. Racing	Chevrolet
81	Kenny Wallace	FILMAR Racing	Ford
88	Dale Jarrett	Robert Yates Racing	Ford
90	Dick Trickle	Donlavey Racing	Ford
91	Mike Wallace	LJ Racing	Chevrolet
94	Bill Elliott	Bill Elliott Racing	Ford
96	David Green (R)	American Equipment Racing	Chevrolet
97	Chad Little	Mark Rypien Motorsports	Pontiac
98	John Andretti	Cale Yarborough Motorsports	Ford
99	Jeff Burton	Roush Racing	Ford

== Qualifying ==
Qualifying was split into two rounds. The first round was held on Friday, April 18, at 3:00 PM EST. Each driver would have one lap to set a time. During the first round, the top 25 drivers in the round would be guaranteed a starting spot in the race. If a driver was not able to guarantee a spot in the first round, they had the option to scrub their time from the first round and try and run a faster lap time in a second round qualifying run, held on Saturday, April 19, at 1:00 PM EST. As with the first round, each driver would have one lap to set a time. Positions 26-38 would be decided on time, and depending on who needed it, the 39th thru either the 42nd, 43rd, or 44th position would be based on provisionals. Four spots are awarded by the use of provisionals based on owner's points. The fifth is awarded to a past champion who has not otherwise qualified for the race. If no past champion needs the provisional, the field would be limited to 42 cars. If a champion needed it, the field would expand to 43 cars. If the race was a companion race with the NASCAR Winston West Series, four spots would be determined by NASCAR Winston Cup Series provisionals, while the final two spots would be given to teams in the Winston West Series, leaving the field at 44 cars.

Kenny Wallace, driving for FILMAR Racing, would win the pole, setting a time of 20.153 and an average speed of 93.961 miles per hour (151.216 km/h).

=== Full qualifying results ===
Pos.	#	Driver	Team	Make	Time	Speed
1	81	Kenny Wallace	FILMAR Racing	Ford	20.153	93.961
2	42	Joe Nemechek	Team SABCO	Chevrolet	20.204	93.724
3	7	Geoff Bodine	Geoff Bodine Racing	Ford	20.241	93.553
4	24	Jeff Gordon	Hendrick Motorsports	Chevrolet	20.287	93.341
5	10	Ricky Rudd	Rudd Performance Motorsports	Ford	20.312	93.226
6	8	Hut Stricklin	Stavola Brothers Racing	Ford	20.318	93.198
7	5	Terry Labonte	Hendrick Motorsports	Chevrolet	20.320	93.189
8	43	Bobby Hamilton	Petty Enterprises	Pontiac	20.329	93.148
9	94	Bill Elliott	Bill Elliott Racing	Ford	20.331	93.139
10	44	Kyle Petty	Petty Enterprises	Pontiac	20.345	93.074
11	23	Jimmy Spencer	Travis Carter Enterprises	Ford	20.346	93.070
12	16	Ted Musgrave	Roush Racing	Ford	20.350	93.052
13	29	Robert Pressley	Diamond Ridge Motorsports	Chevrolet	20.351	93.047
14	18	Bobby Labonte	Joe Gibbs Racing	Pontiac	20.356	93.024
15	2	Rusty Wallace	Penske Racing South	Ford	20.366	92.978
16	31	Mike Skinner (R)	Richard Childress Racing	Chevrolet	20.377	92.928
17	17	Darrell Waltrip	Darrell Waltrip Motorsports	Chevrolet	20.386	92.887
18	22	Ward Burton	Bill Davis Racing	Pontiac	20.440	92.642
19	99	Jeff Burton	Roush Racing	Ford	20.445	92.619
20	9	Lake Speed	Melling Racing	Ford	20.456	92.569
21	1	Morgan Shepherd	Precision Products Racing	Pontiac	20.461	92.547
22	30	Johnny Benson Jr.	Bahari Racing	Pontiac	20.466	92.524
23	88	Dale Jarrett	Robert Yates Racing	Ford	20.467	92.520
24	36	Derrike Cope	MB2 Motorsports	Pontiac	20.474	92.488
25	3	Dale Earnhardt	Richard Childress Racing	Chevrolet	20.491	92.411
26	33	Ken Schrader	Andy Petree Racing	Chevrolet	20.330	93.143
27	98	John Andretti	Cale Yarborough Motorsports	Ford	20.400	92.824
28	41	Steve Grissom	Larry Hedrick Motorsports	Chevrolet	20.493	92.402
29	37	Jeremy Mayfield	Kranefuss-Haas Racing	Ford	20.496	92.389
30	28	Ernie Irvan	Robert Yates Racing	Ford	20.496	92.389
31	90	Dick Trickle	Donlavey Racing	Ford	20.498	92.380
32	75	Rick Mast	Butch Mock Motorsports	Ford	20.500	92.371
33	97	Chad Little	Mark Rypien Motorsports	Pontiac	20.511	92.321
34	21	Michael Waltrip	Wood Brothers Racing	Ford	20.512	92.317
35	25	Ricky Craven	Hendrick Motorsports	Chevrolet	20.526	92.254
36	91	Mike Wallace	LJ Racing	Chevrolet	20.533	92.222
37	11	Brett Bodine	Brett Bodine Racing	Ford	20.537	92.204
38	4	Sterling Marlin	Morgan–McClure Motorsports	Chevrolet	20.558	92.110
Provisionals
39	6	Mark Martin	Roush Racing	Ford	-*	-*
40	40	Robby Gordon (R)	Team SABCO	Chevrolet	-*	-*
41	71	Dave Marcis	Marcis Auto Racing	Chevrolet	-*	-*
42	77	Bobby Hillin Jr.	Jasper Motorsports	Ford	-*	-*
Failed to qualify
43	79	Randy MacDonald	T.R.I.X. Racing	Chevrolet	-*	-*
44	78	Billy Standridge	Triad Motorsports	Ford	-*	-*
45	96	David Green (R)	American Equipment Racing	Chevrolet	-*	-*
46	20	Lance Hooper	Ranier-Walsh Racing	Ford	-*	-*
47	19	Gary Bradberry	TriStar Motorsports	Ford	-*	-*
Official qualifying results

== Race results ==
Fin	St	#	Driver	Team	Make	Laps	Led	Status	Pts	Winnings
1	4	24	Jeff Gordon	Hendrick Motorsports	Chevrolet	500	431	running	185	$99,225
2	8	43	Bobby Hamilton	Petty Enterprises	Pontiac	500	48	running	175	$50,575
3	39	6	Mark Martin	Roush Racing	Ford	500	0	running	165	$42,375
4	7	5	Terry Labonte	Hendrick Motorsports	Chevrolet	500	0	running	160	$42,925
5	15	2	Rusty Wallace	Penske Racing South	Ford	500	0	running	155	$33,875
6	1	81	Kenny Wallace	FILMAR Racing	Ford	500	0	running	150	$35,375
7	29	37	Jeremy Mayfield	Kranefuss-Haas Racing	Ford	500	0	running	146	$19,775
8	14	18	Bobby Labonte	Joe Gibbs Racing	Pontiac	500	0	running	142	$29,650
9	17	17	Darrell Waltrip	Darrell Waltrip Motorsports	Chevrolet	500	0	running	138	$25,445
10	26	33	Ken Schrader	Andy Petree Racing	Chevrolet	500	0	running	134	$30,945
11	11	23	Jimmy Spencer	Travis Carter Enterprises	Ford	500	0	running	130	$23,685
12	25	3	Dale Earnhardt	Richard Childress Racing	Chevrolet	500	0	running	127	$28,400
13	5	10	Ricky Rudd	Rudd Performance Motorsports	Ford	500	0	running	124	$27,065
14	6	8	Hut Stricklin	Stavola Brothers Racing	Ford	500	0	running	121	$22,765
15	19	99	Jeff Burton	Roush Racing	Ford	500	0	running	118	$28,215
16	23	88	Dale Jarrett	Robert Yates Racing	Ford	499	0	running	115	$28,265
17	22	30	Johnny Benson Jr.	Bahari Racing	Pontiac	499	0	running	112	$22,365
18	18	22	Ward Burton	Bill Davis Racing	Pontiac	499	0	running	109	$14,770
19	2	42	Joe Nemechek	Team SABCO	Chevrolet	499	21	running	111	$15,865
20	28	41	Steve Grissom	Larry Hedrick Motorsports	Chevrolet	498	0	running	103	$23,115
21	38	4	Sterling Marlin	Morgan–McClure Motorsports	Chevrolet	498	0	running	100	$25,965
22	35	25	Ricky Craven	Hendrick Motorsports	Chevrolet	498	0	running	97	$20,415
23	13	29	Robert Pressley	Diamond Ridge Motorsports	Chevrolet	498	0	running	94	$13,265
24	12	16	Ted Musgrave	Roush Racing	Ford	497	0	running	91	$20,115
25	20	9	Lake Speed	Melling Racing	Ford	497	0	running	88	$20,215
26	34	21	Michael Waltrip	Wood Brothers Racing	Ford	496	0	running	85	$19,815
27	37	11	Brett Bodine	Brett Bodine Racing	Ford	496	0	running	82	$19,665
28	27	98	John Andretti	Cale Yarborough Motorsports	Ford	496	0	running	79	$19,615
29	3	7	Geoff Bodine	Geoff Bodine Racing	Ford	495	0	crash	76	$20,065
30	31	90	Dick Trickle	Donlavey Racing	Ford	495	0	running	73	$9,515
31	30	28	Ernie Irvan	Robert Yates Racing	Ford	494	0	running	70	$24,465
32	16	31	Mike Skinner (R)	Richard Childress Racing	Chevrolet	490	0	running	67	$10,440
33	42	77	Bobby Hillin Jr.	Jasper Motorsports	Ford	489	0	running	64	$9,415
34	24	36	Derrike Cope	MB2 Motorsports	Pontiac	481	0	running	61	$11,140
35	21	1	Morgan Shepherd	Precision Products Racing	Pontiac	479	0	running	58	$16,365
36	32	75	Rick Mast	Butch Mock Motorsports	Ford	477	0	running	55	$16,340
37	9	94	Bill Elliott	Bill Elliott Racing	Ford	454	0	running	52	$14,075
38	41	71	Dave Marcis	Marcis Auto Racing	Chevrolet	417	0	running	49	$7,075
39	36	91	Mike Wallace	LJ Racing	Chevrolet	414	0	running	46	$7,075
40	10	44	Kyle Petty	Petty Enterprises	Pontiac	398	0	handling	43	$7,075
41	40	40	Robby Gordon (R)	Team SABCO	Chevrolet	395	0	crash	40	$7,075
42	33	97	Chad Little	Mark Rypien Motorsports	Pontiac	394	0	running	37	$7,075
Official race results

Previous race: 1997 Food City 500	NASCAR Winston Cup Series; 1997 season	Next race: 1997 Save Mart Supermarkets 300
