= 2002 Virginia 500 =

Eighth race of the 2002 NASCAR Winston Cup Series

Race details
- Race 8 of 36 in the 2002 NASCAR Winston Cup Series
- The 2002 Virginia 500 program cover.
- Date: April 14, 2002
- Official name: 53rd Annual Virginia 500
- Location: Martinsville, Virginia; Martinsville, Virginia
- Course: Permanent racing facility
- Course length: 0.526 miles (0.847 km)
- Distance: 500 laps, 263 mi (423.257 km)
- Scheduled distance: 500 laps, 263 mi (423.257 km)
- Average speed: 73.951 miles per hour (119.013 km/h)

Pole position
| Driver | Jeff Gordon | Hendrick Motorsports |
- Time: 20.106

Most laps led
| Driver | Tony Stewart | Joe Gibbs Racing |
- Laps: 152

Winner
| No. 18 | Bobby Labonte | Joe Gibbs Racing |

Television in the United States
- Network: FX
- Announcers: Mike Joy, Larry McReynolds, Darrell Waltrip

Radio in the United States
- Radio: Motor Racing Network
- Booth announcers: Barney Hall, Joe Moore
- Turn announcers: Mike Bagley

The 2002 Virginia 500 was the eighth stock car race of the 2002 NASCAR Winston Cup Series and the 53rd iteration of the event. The race was held on Sunday, April 14, 2002, in Martinsville, Virginia at Martinsville Speedway, a 0.526 miles (0.847 km) permanent oval-shaped short track. The race took the scheduled 500 laps to complete. At race's end, Bobby Labonte, driving for Joe Gibbs Racing, would hold off the field on the final restart with seven to go to win his 19th career NASCAR Winston Cup Series win and his first and only win of the season. To fill out the podium, Matt Kenseth of Roush Racing and Tony Stewart of Joe Gibbs Racing would finish second and third, respectively.

== Background ==
The layout of Martinsville Speedway, the venue where the race was held.

Martinsville Speedway is a NASCAR-owned stock car racing track located in Henry County, in Ridgeway, Virginia, just to the south of Martinsville. At 0.526 miles (0.847 km) in length, it is the shortest track in the NASCAR Cup Series. The track was also one of the first paved oval tracks in NASCAR, being built in 1947 by H. Clay Earles. It is also the only remaining race track that has been on the NASCAR circuit from its beginning in 1948.

Kenny Wallace replaced Kevin Harvick, who was parked by NASCAR for a deliberate collision against Coy Gibbs during the supporting Trucks race (Advance Auto Parts 250); Harvick had been in probation for an altercation against Greg Biffle at the Busch Series Bristol race weeks prior. Harvick was also fined $35,000 and had his probation from the altercation, originally intended to expire on August 28, 2002, extended to December 31 instead.

=== Entry list ===
- (R) denotes rookie driver.

| # | Driver | Team | Make |
|---|---|---|---|
| 1 | Steve Park | Dale Earnhardt, Inc. | Chevrolet |
| 2 | Rusty Wallace | Penske Racing | Ford |
| 02 | Hermie Sadler | SCORE Motorsports | Chevrolet |
| 4 | Mike Skinner | Morgan–McClure Motorsports | Chevrolet |
| 5 | Terry Labonte | Hendrick Motorsports | Chevrolet |
| 6 | Mark Martin | Roush Racing | Ford |
| 7 | Casey Atwood | Ultra-Evernham Motorsports | Dodge |
| 8 | Dale Earnhardt Jr. | Dale Earnhardt, Inc. | Chevrolet |
| 9 | Bill Elliott | Evernham Motorsports | Dodge |
| 10 | Johnny Benson Jr. | MBV Motorsports | Pontiac |
| 11 | Brett Bodine | Brett Bodine Racing | Ford |
| 12 | Ryan Newman (R) | Penske Racing | Ford |
| 14 | Stacy Compton | A. J. Foyt Enterprises | Pontiac |
| 15 | Michael Waltrip | Dale Earnhardt, Inc. | Chevrolet |
| 17 | Matt Kenseth | Roush Racing | Ford |
| 18 | Bobby Labonte | Joe Gibbs Racing | Pontiac |
| 19 | Jeremy Mayfield | Evernham Motorsports | Dodge |
| 20 | Tony Stewart | Joe Gibbs Racing | Pontiac |
| 21 | Elliott Sadler | Wood Brothers Racing | Ford |
| 22 | Ward Burton | Bill Davis Racing | Dodge |
| 23 | Hut Stricklin | Bill Davis Racing | Dodge |
| 24 | Jeff Gordon | Hendrick Motorsports | Chevrolet |
| 25 | Jerry Nadeau | Hendrick Motorsports | Chevrolet |
| 26 | Frank Kimmel | Haas-Carter Motorsports | Ford |
| 28 | Ricky Rudd | Robert Yates Racing | Ford |
| 29 | Kevin Harvick* | Richard Childress Racing | Chevrolet |
| 30 | Jeff Green | Richard Childress Racing | Chevrolet |
| 31 | Robby Gordon | Richard Childress Racing | Chevrolet |
| 32 | Ricky Craven | PPI Motorsports | Ford |
| 36 | Ken Schrader | MB2 Motorsports | Pontiac |
| 40 | Sterling Marlin | Chip Ganassi Racing | Dodge |
| 41 | Jimmy Spencer | Chip Ganassi Racing | Dodge |
| 43 | John Andretti | Petty Enterprises | Dodge |
| 44 | Buckshot Jones | Petty Enterprises | Dodge |
| 45 | Kyle Petty | Petty Enterprises | Dodge |
| 48 | Jimmie Johnson (R) | Hendrick Motorsports | Chevrolet |
| 55 | Bobby Hamilton | Andy Petree Racing | Chevrolet |
| 59 | Randy Renfrow | Price Motorsports | Dodge |
| 71 | Andy Hillenburg | Marcis Auto Racing | Chevrolet |
| 77 | Dave Blaney | Jasper Motorsports | Ford |
| 88 | Dale Jarrett | Robert Yates Racing | Ford |
| 90 | Rick Mast | Donlavey Racing | Ford |
| 97 | Kurt Busch | Roush Racing | Ford |
| 99 | Jeff Burton | Roush Racing | Ford |
Official entry list

- (R) denotes rookie driver.

== Practice ==
=== First practice ===
The first practice session was held on Friday, April 12, at 11:20 AM EST, and would last for two hours. Dale Earnhardt Jr. of Dale Earnhardt, Inc. would set the fastest time in the session, with a lap of 29.145 and an average speed of 168.723 miles per hour (271.533 km/h).

| Pos. | # | Driver | Team | Make | Time | Speed |
|---|---|---|---|---|---|---|
| 1 | 8 | Dale Earnhardt Jr. | Dale Earnhardt, Inc. | Chevrolet | 20.193 | 93.775 |
| 2 | 12 | Ryan Newman (R) | Penske Racing | Ford | 20.197 | 93.751 |
| 3 | 41 | Jimmy Spencer | Chip Ganassi Racing | Dodge | 20.211 | 93.692 |
Full first practice results

=== Second practice ===
The second practice session was held on Saturday, April 13, at 10:30 AM EST, and would last for 45 minutes. Sterling Marlin of Chip Ganassi Racing would set the fastest time in the session, with a lap of 29.145 and an average speed of 168.723 miles per hour (271.533 km/h).

| Pos. | # | Driver | Team | Make | Time | Speed |
|---|---|---|---|---|---|---|
| 1 | 40 | Sterling Marlin | Chip Ganassi Racing | Dodge | 20.412 | 92.768 |
| 2 | 20 | Tony Stewart | Joe Gibbs Racing | Pontiac | 20.430 | 92.686 |
| 3 | 5 | Terry Labonte | Hendrick Motorsports | Chevrolet | 20.443 | 92.627 |
Full second practice results

=== Third and final practice ===
The third and final practice session, sometimes referred to as Happy Hour, was held on Saturday, April 13, at 12:15 PM EST, and would last for 45 minutes. Tony Stewart of Joe Gibbs Racing would set the fastest time in the session, with a lap of 20.347 and an average speed of 93.060 miles per hour (149.766 km/h).

| Pos. | # | Driver | Team | Make | Time | Speed |
|---|---|---|---|---|---|---|
| 1 | 20 | Tony Stewart | Joe Gibbs Racing | Pontiac | 20.347 | 93.060 |
| 2 | 55 | Bobby Hamilton | Andy Petree Racing | Chevrolet | 20.409 | 92.782 |
| 3 | 40 | Sterling Marlin | Chip Ganassi Racing | Dodge | 20.440 | 92.641 |
Full Happy Hour practice results

== Qualifying ==
Qualifying was held on Friday, April 12, at 3:05 PM EST. Each driver would have two laps to set a fastest time; the fastest of the two would count as their official qualifying lap. Positions 1-36 would be decided on time, while positions 37-43 would be based on provisionals. Six spots are awarded by the use of provisionals based on owner's points. The seventh is awarded to a past champion who has not otherwise qualified for the race. If no past champ needs the provisional, the next team in the owner points will be awarded a provisional.

Jeff Gordon of Hendrick Motorsports would win the pole, setting a time of 20.106 and an average speed of 94.181 miles per hour (151.570 km/h).

Randy Renfrow was the only driver to fail to qualify.

=== Full qualifying results ===
| Pos. | # | Driver | Team | Make | Time | Speed |
|---|---|---|---|---|---|---|
| 1 | 24 | Jeff Gordon | Hendrick Motorsports | Chevrolet | 20.106 | 94.181 |
| 2 | 55 | Bobby Hamilton | Andy Petree Racing | Chevrolet | 20.125 | 94.092 |
| 3 | 8 | Dale Earnhardt Jr. | Dale Earnhardt, Inc. | Chevrolet | 20.131 | 94.064 |
| 4 | 5 | Terry Labonte | Hendrick Motorsports | Chevrolet | 20.148 | 93.984 |
| 5 | 2 | Rusty Wallace | Penske Racing | Ford | 20.159 | 93.933 |
| 6 | 9 | Bill Elliott | Evernham Motorsports | Dodge | 20.164 | 93.910 |
| 7 | 29 | Kenny Wallace | Richard Childress Racing | Chevrolet | 20.185 | 93.812 |
| 8 | 20 | Tony Stewart | Joe Gibbs Racing | Pontiac | 20.202 | 93.733 |
| 9 | 41 | Jimmy Spencer | Chip Ganassi Racing | Dodge | 20.204 | 93.724 |
| 10 | 12 | Ryan Newman (R) | Penske Racing | Ford | 20.209 | 93.701 |
| 11 | 31 | Robby Gordon | Richard Childress Racing | Chevrolet | 20.223 | 93.636 |
| 12 | 4 | Mike Skinner | Morgan–McClure Motorsports | Chevrolet | 20.236 | 93.576 |
| 13 | 28 | Ricky Rudd | Robert Yates Racing | Ford | 20.237 | 93.571 |
| 14 | 48 | Jimmie Johnson (R) | Hendrick Motorsports | Chevrolet | 20.246 | 93.530 |
| 15 | 18 | Bobby Labonte | Joe Gibbs Racing | Pontiac | 20.255 | 93.488 |
| 16 | 14 | Stacy Compton | A. J. Foyt Enterprises | Pontiac | 20.271 | 93.414 |
| 17 | 6 | Mark Martin | Roush Racing | Ford | 20.274 | 93.400 |
| 18 | 32 | Ricky Craven | PPI Motorsports | Ford | 20.275 | 93.396 |
| 19 | 19 | Jeremy Mayfield | Evernham Motorsports | Dodge | 20.277 | 93.387 |
| 20 | 97 | Kurt Busch | Roush Racing | Ford | 20.286 | 93.345 |
| 21 | 43 | John Andretti | Petty Enterprises | Dodge | 20.292 | 93.318 |
| 22 | 23 | Hut Stricklin | Bill Davis Racing | Dodge | 20.295 | 93.304 |
| 23 | 99 | Jeff Burton | Roush Racing | Ford | 20.303 | 93.267 |
| 24 | 25 | Jerry Nadeau | Hendrick Motorsports | Chevrolet | 20.306 | 93.253 |
| 25 | 77 | Dave Blaney | Jasper Motorsports | Ford | 20.307 | 93.249 |
| 26 | 17 | Matt Kenseth | Roush Racing | Ford | 20.317 | 93.203 |
| 27 | 45 | Kyle Petty | Petty Enterprises | Dodge | 20.322 | 93.180 |
| 28 | 44 | Buckshot Jones | Petty Enterprises | Dodge | 20.333 | 93.129 |
| 29 | 40 | Sterling Marlin | Chip Ganassi Racing | Dodge | 20.343 | 93.084 |
| 30 | 11 | Brett Bodine | Brett Bodine | Ford | 20.353 | 93.038 |
| 31 | 88 | Dale Jarrett | Robert Yates Racing | Ford | 20.356 | 93.024 |
| 32 | 1 | Steve Park | Dale Earnhardt, Inc. | Chevrolet | 20.359 | 93.010 |
| 33 | 15 | Michael Waltrip | Dale Earnhardt, Inc. | Chevrolet | 20.363 | 92.992 |
| 34 | 7 | Casey Atwood | Ultra-Evernham Motorsports | Dodge | 20.363 | 92.992 |
| 35 | 02 | Hermie Sadler | SCORE Motorsports | Chevrolet | 20.365 | 92.983 |
| 36 | 22 | Ward Burton | Bill Davis Racing | Dodge | 20.369 | 92.965 |
Provisionals
| 37 | 21 | Elliott Sadler | Wood Brothers Racing | Ford | 20.427 | 92.701 |
| 38 | 30 | Jeff Green | Richard Childress Racing | Chevrolet | 20.470 | 92.506 |
| 39 | 10 | Johnny Benson Jr. | MBV Motorsports | Pontiac | 20.379 | 92.919 |
| 40 | 36 | Ken Schrader | MB2 Motorsports | Pontiac | 20.381 | 92.910 |
| 41 | 26 | Frank Kimmel | Haas-Carter Motorsports | Ford | 20.524 | 92.263 |
| 42 | 90 | Rick Mast | Donlavey Racing | Ford | 20.448 | 92.606 |
| 43 | 71 | Andy Hillenburg | Marcis Auto Racing | Chevrolet | 22.229 | 85.186 |
Failed to qualify
| 44 | 59 | Randy Renfrow | Price Motorsports | Dodge | 20.458 | 92.560 |
Official qualifying results

== Race results ==
| Fin | St | # | Driver | Team | Make | Laps | Led | Status | Pts | Winnings |
|---|---|---|---|---|---|---|---|---|---|---|
| 1 | 15 | 18 | Bobby Labonte | Joe Gibbs Racing | Pontiac | 500 | 61 | running | 180 | $168,078 |
| 2 | 26 | 17 | Matt Kenseth | Roush Racing | Ford | 500 | 0 | running | 170 | $97,165 |
| 3 | 8 | 20 | Tony Stewart | Joe Gibbs Racing | Pontiac | 500 | 152 | running | 175 | $111,953 |
| 4 | 31 | 88 | Dale Jarrett | Robert Yates Racing | Ford | 500 | 0 | running | 160 | $112,553 |
| 5 | 3 | 8 | Dale Earnhardt Jr. | Dale Earnhardt, Inc. | Chevrolet | 500 | 41 | running | 160 | $88,862 |
| 6 | 4 | 5 | Terry Labonte | Hendrick Motorsports | Chevrolet | 500 | 11 | running | 155 | $80,508 |
| 7 | 13 | 28 | Ricky Rudd | Robert Yates Racing | Ford | 500 | 0 | running | 146 | $90,442 |
| 8 | 17 | 6 | Mark Martin | Roush Racing | Ford | 500 | 0 | running | 142 | $82,833 |
| 9 | 23 | 99 | Jeff Burton | Roush Racing | Ford | 500 | 6 | running | 143 | $88,067 |
| 10 | 20 | 97 | Kurt Busch | Roush Racing | Ford | 500 | 0 | running | 134 | $59,750 |
| 11 | 19 | 19 | Jeremy Mayfield | Evernham Motorsports | Dodge | 500 | 0 | running | 130 | $54,085 |
| 12 | 29 | 40 | Sterling Marlin | Chip Ganassi Racing | Dodge | 500 | 0 | running | 127 | $85,592 |
| 13 | 33 | 15 | Michael Waltrip | Dale Earnhardt, Inc. | Chevrolet | 500 | 0 | running | 124 | $53,275 |
| 14 | 36 | 22 | Ward Burton | Bill Davis Racing | Dodge | 500 | 20 | running | 126 | $83,775 |
| 15 | 22 | 23 | Hut Stricklin | Bill Davis Racing | Dodge | 500 | 0 | running | 118 | $55,500 |
| 16 | 5 | 2 | Rusty Wallace | Penske Racing | Ford | 500 | 10 | running | 120 | $85,000 |
| 17 | 25 | 77 | Dave Blaney | Jasper Motorsports | Ford | 500 | 1 | running | 117 | $69,250 |
| 18 | 16 | 14 | Stacy Compton | A. J. Foyt Enterprises | Pontiac | 500 | 1 | running | 114 | $43,525 |
| 19 | 39 | 10 | Johnny Benson Jr. | MBV Motorsports | Pontiac | 500 | 0 | running | 106 | $69,875 |
| 20 | 27 | 45 | Kyle Petty | Petty Enterprises | Dodge | 500 | 0 | running | 103 | $41,645 |
| 21 | 9 | 41 | Jimmy Spencer | Chip Ganassi Racing | Dodge | 499 | 0 | running | 100 | $43,625 |
| 22 | 38 | 30 | Jeff Green | Richard Childress Racing | Chevrolet | 499 | 0 | running | 97 | $38,725 |
| 23 | 1 | 24 | Jeff Gordon | Hendrick Motorsports | Chevrolet | 498 | 68 | running | 99 | $107,003 |
| 24 | 32 | 1 | Steve Park | Dale Earnhardt, Inc. | Chevrolet | 498 | 0 | running | 91 | $71,800 |
| 25 | 12 | 4 | Mike Skinner | Morgan–McClure Motorsports | Chevrolet | 498 | 0 | running | 88 | $57,025 |
| 26 | 30 | 11 | Brett Bodine | Brett Bodine | Ford | 498 | 0 | running | 85 | $54,275 |
| 27 | 2 | 55 | Bobby Hamilton | Andy Petree Racing | Chevrolet | 498 | 47 | running | 87 | $61,460 |
| 28 | 37 | 21 | Elliott Sadler | Wood Brothers Racing | Ford | 497 | 0 | running | 79 | $57,049 |
| 29 | 35 | 02 | Hermie Sadler | SCORE Motorsports | Chevrolet | 497 | 0 | running | 76 | $37,275 |
| 30 | 18 | 32 | Ricky Craven | PPI Motorsports | Ford | 496 | 40 | running | 78 | $48,750 |
| 31 | 6 | 9 | Bill Elliott | Evernham Motorsports | Dodge | 495 | 0 | running | 70 | $66,081 |
| 32 | 7 | 29 | Kenny Wallace | Richard Childress Racing | Chevrolet | 490 | 0 | running | 67 | $82,678 |
| 33 | 28 | 44 | Buckshot Jones | Petty Enterprises | Dodge | 483 | 0 | crash | 64 | $36,680 |
| 34 | 11 | 31 | Robby Gordon | Richard Childress Racing | Chevrolet | 481 | 0 | vibration | 61 | $65,611 |
| 35 | 14 | 48 | Jimmie Johnson (R) | Hendrick Motorsports | Chevrolet | 446 | 0 | vibration | 58 | $37,500 |
| 36 | 40 | 36 | Ken Schrader | MB2 Motorsports | Pontiac | 442 | 0 | running | 55 | $46,950 |
| 37 | 42 | 90 | Rick Mast | Donlavey Racing | Ford | 411 | 0 | rear end | 52 | $36,400 |
| 38 | 34 | 7 | Casey Atwood | Ultra-Evernham Motorsports | Dodge | 357 | 0 | running | 49 | $36,340 |
| 39 | 24 | 25 | Jerry Nadeau | Hendrick Motorsports | Chevrolet | 341 | 42 | overheating | 51 | $44,290 |
| 40 | 41 | 26 | Frank Kimmel | Haas-Carter Motorsports | Ford | 282 | 0 | crash | 43 | $61,402 |
| 41 | 10 | 12 | Ryan Newman (R) | Penske Racing | Ford | 257 | 0 | overheating | 40 | $44,165 |
| 42 | 21 | 43 | John Andretti | Petty Enterprises | Dodge | 209 | 0 | engine | 37 | $63,193 |
| 43 | 43 | 71 | Andy Hillenburg | Marcis Auto Racing | Chevrolet | 9 | 0 | clutch | 34 | $35,405 |
Official race results

| Previous race: 2002 Samsung/RadioShack 500 | NASCAR Winston Cup Series; 2002 season | Next race: 2002 Aaron's 499 |
