= Gordon Racing =

Former NASCAR team

Gordon Racing was a NASCAR team from 1970–1983. It was owned by driver Cecil Gordon. The team ran 416 races without winning a single one of them.

Gordon Racing had 29 top 5s, 108 top 10s, 280 top 20s, and 115 Did Not Finishes. They had an average start of 17.24 and an average finish of 20.8. They led 123 out of a possible 107,152 laps.

== 24 car history ==
The No. 24 car was driven primarily by owner Cecil Gordon starting in 1970 though 1983. Henley Gray also drove the car for one race in 1970. No one else drove the No. 24 car other than Gordon until 1978 when Junior Miller drove one race. D.K. Ulrich drove one race in 1979. In 1980, Lake Speed drove the car for one race. In 1981 a variety of drivers drove the car, including Morgan Shepherd (7 races), Lennie Pond, Steve Spencer, and Jimmy Hensley (all one race each). In 1982, Lennie Pond (10 races), Ronnie Thomas (2 races), Dick May, Tony Bettenhausen Jr., John Anderson, and J.D. McDuffie (all 1 race each) drove the car. In 1983, Gordon Racing's last year in competition, Cecil Gordon drove 8 races and Jim Vandiver ran 2 races.

== 97 car history ==
The No. 97 car only ran in 1970. Lee Gordon ran 6 races, Dave Marcis ran 2, and Cecil Gordon, Bill Dennis, and Jim Vandiver drove one race each.
