= Gary Balough =

Racecar driver from Florida

- Born: September 16, 1947 (age 79) Fort Lauderdale, Florida, U.S.
- Retired: 2001

Previous series
- 1962-2001 1973-1983: Late models Modified racing

Championship titles
- 1986 1968: ALL PRO Super Series Champion; Florida Governor's Cup

Awards
- 2015 Northeast Dirt Modified Hall of Fame. 2016 Eastern Motorsports Press Association Hall of Fame
- Achievements: 1984, 1986 All American 400; 1980, 1986 Snowball Derby; 1984 World Crown 300; 1981 Miller High Life 300 (Charlotte Motor Speedway); 1981 Cracker 200; 1976, 1977, 1978, 1980 Super Dirt Week; 1979 Orange Blossom 100

NASCAR Cup Series career
- 22 races run over 6 years
- Best finish: 40th (1981)
- First race: 1979 Daytona 500 (Daytona)
- Last race: 1992 Coca-Cola 600 (Charlotte)
Wins	Top tens	Poles
0	2	0

NASCAR O'Reilly Auto Parts Series career
- 4 races run over 2 years
- Best finish: 68th (1990)
- First race: 1982 Goody's 300 (Daytona)
- Last race: 1990 AC-Delco 200 (Rockingham)
Wins	Top tens	Poles
0	1	0

Gary Balough (born September 16, 1947) is an American former stock car racing driver who competed from 1962 to 2001. Balough has won more than 1000 races throughout his short-track career and has accumulated more than twenty wins in the All-Pro division.

== Racing career ==
Throughout the 1970s, Balough expanded his racing across the entire East Coast. He moved from Late Models in the Southeast to Dirt Modifieds in the Northeast. Between 1976 and 1978, he won the prestigious Syracuse 200 for modifieds. Balough led one lap in his NASCAR Cup career, at the 1981 Talladega 500 where he came from 41st to first, only to suffer from an overheating engine and resulting DNF. In addition to his many short-track wins, Balough also won the 1981 Miller High Life 300 NASCAR Late Model Sportsman race at Charlotte Motor Speedway. Balough beat Dale Earnhardt and Jody Ridley to win the race. Bob Rahilly of RahMoc Racing owned and built the cars and engines for both of these races.

Balough started an average of 21st place and finished an average of 25th while bringing home a career total of $90,900 ($208,550.51 when adjusted for inflation).

== Personal life ==
Balough served a sentence of 45½ months in jail for drug trafficking; which ended his career along with his marriage. A ride with Harry Ranier's team was in the works along with a sponsorship from Domino's Pizza that would have paid him $750,000 ($2,202,868.85 when adjusted for inflation) for having their name appear on his car for 25 races. Balough used many car owners, engine builders and car builders to help Balough become on top of his game.

After his jail sentence expired, Balough still had access to his children and could still practice his hobby of fishing. His first racing event after the end of his jail sentence was a 200-lap "All-Pro" race in Summerville, South Carolina where he earned the pole position and won the race.

Balough later wrote an autobiography and was also the subject of a documentary film.

=== List of achievements ===
- 1968 Florida's Governor's Cup 200 Winner
- 1976 Syracuse 200 Winner
- 1977 Syracuse 200 Winner
- 1978 Syracuse 200 Winner
- 1981 Miller High Life 300 Winner
- 1980 Snowball Derby Winner
- 1980 Syracuse 200 Winner
- 1984 All American 400 Winner
- 1984 World Crown 300 Winner
- 1986 All American 400 Winner
- 1986 All-Pro Champion
- 1986 Snowball Derby Winner

== Motorsports career results ==
=== NASCAR ===
(key) (Bold – Pole position awarded by qualifying time. Italics – Pole position earned by points standings or practice time. * – Most laps led.)

==== Winston Cup Series ====
NASCAR Winston Cup Series results
Year	Team	No.	Make	1	2	3	4	5	6	7	8	9	10	11	12	13	14	15	16	17	18	19	20	21	22	23	24	25	26	27	28	29	30	31	NWCC	Pts	Ref
1979	Billie Harvey	87	Oldsmobile	RSD	DAY; 35	CAR	RCH	ATL	NWS	BRI	DAR	MAR	TAL	NSV	DOV	CLT	TWS	RSD	MCH	DAY; 16	NSV	POC; 35	TAL	MCH	BRI	DAR	RCH	DOV	MAR	CLT	NWS	CAR	ATL	ONT	90th	116	
1980	Billie Harvey	87	Chevy	RSD	DAY	RCH	CAR	ATL	BRI	DAR	NWS	MAR	TAL	NSV	DOV	CLT	TWS	RSD	MCH	DAY	NSV	POC	TAL	MCH	BRI	DAR	RCH	DOV	NWS	MAR	CLT	CAR	ATL; 39		108th	46	
1980	Phil Howard	33	Chevy																															ONT; DNQ	108th	46	
1981	RahMoc Enterprises	75	Chevy	RSD	DAY	RCH	CAR	ATL	BRI	NWS	DAR	MAR	TAL	NSV	DOV	CLT	TWS	RSD	MCH	DAY	NSV	POC; 12													40th	656	
1981	RahMoc Enterprises	75	Buick																				TAL; 25	MCH; 18	BRI	DAR; 25	RCH; 10	DOV; 17	MAR	NWS	CLT; 24	CAR; 32	ATL; 34	RSD; 19	40th	656	
1982	RahMoc Enterprises	75	Pontiac	DAY; 11																															38th	564	
1982	RahMoc Enterprises	75	Buick		RCH; 32	BRI; 23	ATL; 7	CAR; 12	DAR	NWS	MAR	TAL	NSV	DOV	CLT	POC	RSD	MCH	DAY	NSV	POC	TAL	MCH	BRI	DAR	RCH	DOV	NWS	CLT	MAR	CAR	ATL	RSD		38th	564	
1991	Ken Allen	34	Chevy	DAY; DNQ	RCH	CAR	ATL	DAR	BRI	NWS	MAR	TAL	CLT	DOV	SON	POC	MCH	DAY																	74th	89	
1991	Jim Rosenblum Racing	13	Buick																POC; 40	TAL	GLN	MCH	BRI	DAR	RCH	DOV	MAR	NWS							74th	89	
1991	Jim Rosenblum Racing	27	Pontiac																										CLT; 39	CAR	PHO	ATL			74th	89	
1992	Jim Rosenblum Racing	27	Chevy	DAY	CAR	RCH	ATL	DAR	BRI	NWS	MAR	TAL	CLT; 40	DOV	SON	POC	MCH	DAY	POC	TAL	GLN	MCH	BRI	DAR	RCH	DOV	MAR	NWS	CLT	CAR	PHO	ATL			93rd	43	

===== Daytona 500 =====
Year	Team	Manufacturer	Start	Finish
1979	Billie Harvey	Oldsmobile	27	35
1982	RahMoc Enterprises	Pontiac	31	11
1991	Ken Allen	Chevrolet	DNQ	

==== Busch Series ====
NASCAR Busch Series results
Year	Team	No.	Make	1	2	3	4	5	6	7	8	9	10	11	12	13	14	15	16	17	18	19	20	21	22	23	24	25	26	27	28	29	30	31	NBSC	Pts	Ref
1982	RahMoc Enterprises	75	Pontiac	DAY; 4	RCH	BRI	MAR	DAR	HCY	SBO	CRW	RCH	LGY	DOV	HCY	CLT	ASH	HCY	SBO	CAR	CRW	SBO	HCY	LGY	IRP	BRI	HCY	RCH	MAR	CLT	HCY	MAR			106th	160	
1990	Roy Hill	4	Buick	DAY	RCH	CAR	MAR	HCY	DAR	BRI	LAN	SBO	NZH	HCY	CLT	DOV	ROU	VOL	MYB	OXF	NHA	SBO	DUB	IRP	ROU	BRI	DAR; 32	RCH	DOV; 29	MAR	CLT; DNQ	NHA	CAR; 33	MAR	68th	207	
1991		82		DAY; DNQ	RCH	CAR	MAR	VOL	HCY	DAR	BRI	LAN	SBO	NZH	CLT	DOV	ROU	HCY	MYB	GLN	OXF	NHA	SBO	DUB	IRP	ROU	BRI	DAR	RCH	DOV					N/A	N/A	
1991																															CLT; DNQ	NHA	CAR	MAR	N/A	N/A	

Achievements
Preceded by Jody Ridley	Snowball Derby Winner; 1986	Succeeded by Butch Miller
Preceded by Freddy Fryar	Snowball Derby Winner; 1980	Succeeded by Freddy Fryar
