= Bill Elswick =

American racing driver

- Born: William Reed Elswick; February 23, 1948; Charleroi, Pennsylvania, U.S.
- Died: November 2, 2009 (aged 61); New York, New York, U.S.

NASCAR Cup Series career
- 18 races run over 3 years
- Best finish: 36th (1980)
- First race: 1979 Capital City 400 (Richmond)
- Last race: 1981 Firecracker 400 (Daytona)
| Wins | Top tens | Poles |
|---|---|---|
| 0 | 0 | 0 |
- Statistics up to date as of November 12, 2024.

William Reed Elswick (February 23, 1948 – November 2, 2009) was an American professional stock car racing driver who previously competed in the NASCAR Winston Cup Series, where he ran eighteen races from 1979 to 1981, getting a best finish of eleventh at the Daytona 500 in 1981.

Elswick died on November 2, 2009, due to heart failure.

== Motorsports career results ==
=== NASCAR ===
(key) (Bold - Pole position awarded by qualifying time. Italics - Pole position earned by points standings or practice time. * – Most laps led.)

==== Winston Cup Series ====
NASCAR Winston Cup Series results
| Year | Team | No. | Make | 1 | 2 | 3 | 4 | 5 | 6 | 7 | 8 | 9 | 10 | 11 | 12 | 13 | 14 | 15 | 16 | 17 | 18 | 19 | 20 | 21 | 22 | 23 | 24 | 25 | 26 | 27 | 28 | 29 | 30 | 31 | NWCC | Pts | Ref |
|---|---|---|---|---|---|---|---|---|---|---|---|---|---|---|---|---|---|---|---|---|---|---|---|---|---|---|---|---|---|---|---|---|---|---|---|---|---|
| 1979 | RahMoc Enterprises | 75 | Olds | RSD | DAY | CAR | RCH | ATL | NWS | BRI | DAR | MAR | TAL | NSV | DOV | CLT | TWS | RSD | MCH | DAY | NSV | POC | TAL | MCH | BRI | DAR | RCH; 16 | DOV | MAR | CLT | NWS; 19 | CAR; 14 | ATL | ONT | 63rd | 221 | |
| 1980 | RahMoc Enterprises | 05 | Olds | RSD | DAY; 24 | | | | | | | | | | | | | | | | | | | | | | | | | | | CAR; 36 | ATL | ONT | 36th | 1053 | |
| 1980 | RahMoc Enterprises | 75 | Chevy | | | RCH; 15 | CAR; 23 | ATL | BRI; 19 | DAR; 20 | NWS; 24 | MAR; 27 | | | DOV; 30 | CLT; 34 | TWS | RSD | MCH | DAY | NSV | POC | TAL | MCH | BRI | DAR | | | | | | | | | 36th | 1053 | |
| 1980 | RahMoc Enterprises | 75 | Olds | | | | | | | | | | TAL; 35 | NSV | | | | | | | | | | | | | RCH; 14 | DOV | NWS | MAR | CLT | | | | 36th | 1053 | |
| 1981 | RahMoc Enterprises | 57 | Olds | RSD | DAY; 11 | RCH | CAR | | | | | | | | | | | | | | | | | | | | | | | | | | | | 85th | 91 | |
| 1981 | RahMoc Enterprises | 57 | Buick | | | | | ATL; 13 | BRI | NWS | DAR | MAR | TAL | NSV | DOV | CLT | TWS | RSD | MCH | | | | | | | | | | | | | | | | 85th | 91 | |
| 1981 | RahMoc Enterprises | 75 | Buick | | | | | | | | | | | | | | | | | DAY; 24 | NSV | POC | TAL | MCH | BRI | DAR | RCH | DOV | MAR | NWS | CLT | CAR | ATL | RSD | 85th | 91 | |

===== Daytona 500 =====
| Year | Team | Manufacturer | Start | Finish |
|---|---|---|---|---|
| 1980 | RahMoc Enterprises | Oldsmobile | 38 | 24 |
| 1981 | RahMoc Enterprises | Oldsmobile | 21 | 11 |
