= Joel Stowe =

American stock car racing driver

- Born: May 10, 1955 (age 71); Waxhaw, North Carolina, U.S.

NASCAR Cup Series career
- 4 races run over 3 years
- 1982 position: 117th
- Best finish: 89th (1980)
- First race: 1980 CRC Chemicals 500 (Dover)
- Last race: 1982 Holly Farms 400 (North Wilkesboro)
Wins	Top tens	Poles
0	0	0

Joel Stowe (born May 10, 1955) is an American professional stock car racing driver. He competed in the NASCAR Winston Cup Series between 1980 and 1982, totaling four starts in the series. He is from Waxhaw, North Carolina.

== Racing career ==
Stowe made his NASCAR Winston Cup Series debut in 1980. He competed in a race at Dover International Speedway and finished forty laps down in eighteenth, in between champion Richard Petty and longtime car owner James Hylton. After failing to qualify in the 1982 Daytona 500, Stowe participated in the consolation race and finished sixth, two laps down.

== Motorsports career results ==
=== NASCAR ===
(key) (Bold – Pole position awarded by qualifying time. Italics – Pole position earned by points standings or practice time. * – Most laps led.)

==== Winston Cup Series ====
NASCAR Winston Cup Series results
Year	Car owner	No.	Make	1	2	3	4	5	6	7	8	9	10	11	12	13	14	15	16	17	18	19	20	21	22	23	24	25	26	27	28	29	30	31	NWCSC	Pts	Ref
1980	Baxter Price	45	Chevy	RSD	DAY	RCH	CAR	ATL	BRI	DAR	NWS	MAR	TAL	NSV	DOV	CLT	TWS	RSD	MCH	DAY	NSV	POC	TAL	MCH	BRI	DAR	RCH	DOV; 18	NWS; 16	MAR	CLT	CAR	ATL	ONT	89th	109	
1981	Don Satterfield	08	Pontiac	RSD	DAY	RCH	CAR	ATL	BRI	NWS	DAR	MAR	TAL	NSV	DOV	CLT	TWS	RSD	MCH	DAY	NSV	POC	TAL	MCH	BRI; 29	DAR	RCH	DOV	MAR	NWS	CLT	CAR	ATL	RSD	118th	N/A	
1982	Ronnie Thomas	85	Pontiac	DAY; DNQ	RCH	BRI	ATL	CAR	DAR	NWS	MAR	TAL	NSV	DOV	CLT	POC	RSD	MCH	DAY	NSV	POC	TAL	MCH	BRI	DAR	RCH	DOV								117th	N/A	
1982	D. K. Ulrich	40	Buick																									NWS; 27	CLT	MAR	CAR	ATL	RSD		117th	N/A	

=== ARCA Talladega SuperCar Series ===
(key) (Bold – Pole position awarded by qualifying time. Italics – Pole position earned by points standings or practice time. * – Most laps led.)

ARCA Talladega SuperCar Series results
Year	Team	No.	Make	1	2	3	4	5	6	7	8	9	10	11	12	13	ATSCSC	Pts	Ref
1982		28	Buick	NSV	DAY; 10	TAL	FRS	CMS	WIN	NSV	TAT	TAL	FRS	BFS	MIL	SND	73rd	N/A	
