= Billie Harvey =

American racing driver

- Born: February 2, 1950; Delray Beach, Florida, U.S.
- Died: September 13, 2007 (aged 57)

NASCAR Cup Series career
- 8 races run over 4 years
- Best finish: 87th (1980)
- First race: 1980 World 600 (Charlotte)
- Last race: 1983 Talladega 500 (Talladega)
Wins	Top tens	Poles
0	0	0

William J. "Billie" Harvey (February 2, 1950 – September 13, 2007) was an American racing driver from Delray Beach, Florida.

== Career ==
Primarily an ARCA stock car racer, Harvey won two races in the series in 1980, finishing eighth in ARCA points, and made a single CART IndyCar start at the Milwaukee Mile for owner Grant King. Harvey also made eight NASCAR Winston Cup starts from 1980 to 1983 including two Daytona 500 races. His best finish was eleventh in the 1980 Coca-Cola 500.

Harvey had business interests in several marine supply companies in South Florida.

== Motorsports career results ==
=== NASCAR ===
(key) (Bold – Pole position awarded by qualifying time. Italics – Pole position earned by points standings or practice time. * – Most laps led.)

==== Winston Cup Series ====
NASCAR Winston Cup Series results
Year	Team	No.	Make	1	2	3	4	5	6	7	8	9	10	11	12	13	14	15	16	17	18	19	20	21	22	23	24	25	26	27	28	29	30	31	NWCC	Pts	Ref
1980	Billie Harvey	87	Olds	RSD	DAY	RCH	CAR	ATL	BRI	DAR	NWS	MAR	TAL	NSV	DOV	CLT; 27	TWS	RSD	MCH	DAY	NSV		TAL; 16												87th	115	
1980	Billie Harvey	87	Chevy																			POC; 11		MCH; 17	BRI	DAR	RCH	DOV	NWS	MAR	CLT	CAR	ATL		87th	115	
1980	Billie Harvey	31	Chevy																															ONT; DNQ	87th	115	
1981	Billie Harvey	31	Pontiac	RSD	DAY; 41	RCH	CAR	ATL	BRI	NWS	DAR	MAR	TAL	NSV	DOV	CLT	TWS	RSD	MCH	DAY; 41	NSV	POC	TAL; Wth	MCH	BRI	DAR	RCH	DOV	MAR	NWS	CLT	CAR	ATL; DNQ	RSD	91st	80	
1982	Billie Harvey	31	Buick	DAY; 39	RCH	BRI	ATL	CAR	DAR	NWS	MAR	TAL	NSV	DOV	CLT	POC	RSD	MCH	DAY	NSV	POC	TAL	MCH	BRI	DAR	RCH	DOV	NWS	CLT	MAR	CAR	ATL	RSD		104th	46	
1983	Gray Racing	31	Buick	DAY	RCH	CAR	ATL	DAR	NWS	MAR	TAL	NSV	DOV	BRI	CLT	RSD	POC	MCH	DAY	NSV	POC	TAL; 37													NA	0	
1983	Billie Harvey	31	Buick																				MCH; DNQ	BRI	DAR	RCH	DOV	MAR	NWS	CLT	CAR	ATL	RSD		NA	0	

===== Daytona 500 =====
Year	Team	Manufacturer	Start	Finish
1981	Billie Harvey	Pontiac	36	41
1982	Billie Harvey	Buick	35	39

=== ARCA Permatex SuperCar Series ===
(key) (Bold – Pole position awarded by qualifying time. Italics – Pole position earned by points standings or practice time. * – Most laps led.)

ARCA Permatex SuperCar Series results
Year	Team	No.	Make	1	2	3	4	5	6	7	8	9	10	11	12	13	14	15	16	17	18	19	20	APSC	Pts	Ref
1980	Billie Harvey	87	Chevy	DAY	NWS	FRS	FRS	MCH	**TAL**; 1*	IMS	FRS													8th	430	
1980	Billie Harvey	31	Pontiac									MCH; 1												8th	430	
1981	Billie Harvey	87	Buick	DAY; DNQ																				NA	-	
1981	Billie Harvey	31	Pontiac	DAY; 25	DSP	FRS	FRS	BFS																NA	-	
1981	Billie Harvey	31	Olds						**TAL**; 8	FRS	COR													NA	-	
1982	Billie Harvey	31	Pontiac	NSV; 31																				18th	400	
1982	Billie Harvey	31	Olds		**DAY**; 2	TAL; 2	FRS	CMS	WIN	NSV	TAT	TAL	FRS	BFS	MIL	SND								18th	400	
1983	Billie Harvey	31	Olds	DAY	NSV	TAL	LPR	LPR	ISF	IRP	SSP	FRS	BFS	WIN	LPR	POC	**TAL**; 4	MCS	FRS	MIL	DSF	ZAN	SND	NA	-	
1984	Billie Harvey	31	Pontiac	DAY; 3																				NA	-	
1984	Billie Harvey	31	Olds		ATL; 27	TAL	CSP	SMS	FRS	MCS	LCS	IRP	TAL	FRS	ISF	DSF	TOL	MGR						NA	-	
1985	Gray Racing	31	Chevy	ATL; 6	DAY; 10	ATL; 29	TAL; 5	ATL; 28	SSP	IRP	CSP	FRS	IRP	OEF	ISF	DSF	TOL							23rd	-	
1986	Gray Racing	31	Chevy	ATL	DAY; 39	ATL	TAL	SIR	SSP	FRS	KIL	CSP	TAL	BLN	ISF	DSF	TOL	MCS	ATL					92nd	-	
