= 1979 Sun-Drop Music City USA 420 =

Auto race held at Nashville Speedway in 1979

Race details
- Race 11 of 31 in the 1979 NASCAR Winston Cup Series season
- Date: May 12, 1979
- Official name: Sun-Drop Music City USA 420
- Location: Nashville Speedway, Nashville, Tennessee
- Course: Permanent racing facility
- Course length: 0.959 km (0.596 miles)
- Distance: 420 laps, 250.3 mi (402.8 km)
- Weather: Hot with temperatures of 86 °F (30 °C); wind speeds of 13 miles per hour (21 km/h)
- Average speed: 88.652 miles per hour (142.672 km/h)

Pole position
Driver	Joe Millikan	L.G. DeWitt

Most laps led
Driver	Richard Petty	Petty Enterprises
- Laps: 164

Winner
No. 11	Cale Yarborough	Junior Johnson

Television in the United States
- Network: untelevised
- Announcers: none

The 1979 Sun-Drop Music City USA 420 as a NASCAR Winston Cup Series racing event that took place on May 12, 1979, at Nashville Speedway in Nashville, Tennessee.

By the following season, NASCAR had completely stopped tracking the year model of all the vehicles and most teams did not take stock cars to the track under their own power anymore. Only manual transmission vehicles were allowed to participate in this race; a policy that NASCAR has retained to the present day.

== Background ==
Nashville Speedway was converted to a half-mile paved oval in 1957, when it began to be a NASCAR series track. The speedway was lengthened between the 1969 and 1970 seasons. The corners were cut down from 35 degrees to their present 18 degrees in 1972.

== Summary ==
This race was a 420-lap race; Harry Gant would be credited with the last-place finish due to an engine problem after only 18 laps of racing.

Cale Yarborough would defeat Richard Petty by nearly three seconds after almost three hours of racing action. Yarborough would win his third Nashville race in a row along with his seventh and final Cup win at Nashville. A small crowd of 16000 people would see only three caution periods (lasting 27 laps) and nine different changes concerning the leader of the race. Joe Millikan would get his only pole position start here; qualifying at speeds up to 104.155 miles per hour (167.621 km/h). Darrell Basham places 24th in his only Winston Cup start.

McDuffie finished higher before but leading 111 laps had to make this his top race of all time. He never had a race that he came close to leading this many laps in his entire career. Joe Millikan led the first 31 laps and McDuffie took the lead from him. He led and later hooked fenders with Cale Yarborough while battling for second place during the 52nd lap. Both spun out but both were able to continue. McDuffie had a shot to win this thing when he took the lead from Richard Petty on the 250th lap, leading 27 more laps, but lost two laps when he had to pit for fresh tires.

The finish was marred by controversy. Richard Petty and Bobby Allison asserted that Cale Yarborough was a lap down at the finish. Said Petty, "He lost one lap when he spun (with J.D. McDuffie), then he lost another when he spent 22 seconds in the pits." Allison agreed, saying, "Richard won this race and I finished second. I don't know how they had Cale winning."

A star-studded top ten finishing chart would include fan favorites like Bobby Allison, Dale Earnhardt, J.D. McDuffie, Richard Childress, Benny Parsons, Buddy Baker, Terry Labonte, and Ricky Rudd. Al Elmore and Steve Spencer would make their NASCAR Cup Series debuts during this race.

Notable crew chiefs for the race were Buddy Parrott, Tex Powell, Joey Arrington, Kirk Shelmerdine, Darrell Bryant, Dale Inman, and Jake Elder.

The entire racing purse for this event was $70,100 ($303,702.38 when adjusted for inflation). Yarborough would receive $12,275 for winning ($53,180.41 when adjusted for inflation) the race while last-place finisher Gant would only receive $360 of the total purse ($1,559.67 when adjusted for inflation).

=== Qualifying ===
Grid	No.	Driver	Manufacturer
1	72	Joe Millikan	Chevrolet
2	28	Buddy Baker	Chevrolet
3	88	Darrell Waltrip	Chevrolet
4	11	Cale Yarborough	Oldsmobile
5	43	Richard Petty	Chevrolet
6	15	Bobby Allison	Ford
7	2	Dale Earnhardt	Chevrolet
8	27	Benny Parsons	Chevrolet
9	70	J.D. McDuffie	Chevrolet
10	44	Terry Labonte	Chevrolet
11	47	Harry Gant	Chevrolet
12	90	Ricky Rudd	Ford
13	24	D.K. Ulrich	Oldsmobile
14	48	James Hylton	Chevrolet
15	19	Steve Spencer	Buick

== Timeline ==
Section reference:

- Start: Joe Millikan was the driver who was leading the racing grid as the green flag was waved.
- Lap 18: Harry Gant fell out with engine failure.
- Lap 32: J.D. McDuffie took over the lead from Joe Millikan.
- Lap 36: Transmission issues managed to take Dick Brooks out of the race.
- Lap 44: Darrell Waltrip took over the lead from J.D. McDuffie.
- Lap 63: Buddy Arrington fell out with engine failure.
- Lap 73: J.D. McDuffie took over the lead from Darrell Waltrip.
- Lap 95: Vehicle ignition problems managed to knock Nelson Oswald out of the event.
- Lap 101: Darrell Basham managed to lose the rear end of his vehicle in a relatively unsafe manner.
- Lap 124: Joe Millikan fell out with engine failure.
- Lap 140: Darrell Waltrip took over the lead from J.D. McDuffie.
- Lap 142: J.D. McDuffie took over the lead from Darrell Waltrip.
- Lap 147: Richard Petty took over the lead from J.D. McDuffie.
- Lap 250: J.D. McDuffie took over the lead from Richard Petty.
- Lap 277: Richard Petty took over the lead from J.D. McDuffie.
- Lap 333: Cale Yarborough took over the lead from Richard Petty.
- Lap 355: Frank Warren fell out with engine failure.
- Lap 356: A problem with the vehicle's clutch ended Baxter Price's hopes of winning the race.
- Finish: Cale Yarborough was officially declared the winner of the event.

== Standings after the race ==
Pos	Driver	Points	Differential
1	Darrell Waltrip	1767	0
2	Bobby Allison	1746	-21
3	Richard Petty	1639	-128
4 ▲	Cale Yarborough	1557	-210
5 ▼	Joe Millikan	1496	-271
6 ▲	Benny Parsons	1451	-319
7 ▲	Dale Earnhardt	1431	-336
8 ▲	D.K. Ulrich	1346	-421
9 ▲	Richard Childress	1331	-436
10 ▼	Donnie Allison	1318	-449

Preceded by 1979 Winston 500	NASCAR Winston Cup Series Season; 1979	Succeeded by 1979 Mason-Dixon 500
