= 1979 Champion Spark Plug 400 =

Auto race held at Michigan International Speedway in 1979

Race details
- Race 21 of 31 in the 1979 NASCAR Winston Cup Series season
- 1979 Champion Spark Plug 400 program cover
- Date: August 19, 1979
- Official name: Champion Spark Plug 400
- Location: Michigan International Speedway, Brooklyn, Michigan
- Course: Permanent racing facility
- Course length: 3.218 km (2.000 miles)
- Distance: 200 laps, 400 mi (643 km)
- Weather: Mild with temperatures of 78.1 °F (25.6 °C); wind speeds of 9.9 miles per hour (15.9 km/h)
- Average speed: 130.367 miles per hour (209.805 km/h)
- Attendance: 60,000

Pole position
Driver	David Pearson	Osterlund Motorsports

Most laps led
Driver	Buddy Baker	Ranier Racing
- Laps: 115

Winner
No. 43	Richard Petty	Petty Enterprises

Television in the United States
- Network: untelevised
- Announcers: none

Radio in the United States
- Radio: Motor Racing Network
- Booth announcers: Jack Arute & Barney Hall
- Turn announcers: Turns 1 & 2: Mike Joy; Turns 3 & 4: Eli Gold; Pit Reporter: Ned Jarrett

The 1979 Champion Spark Plug 400 was a NASCAR Winston Cup Series event that took place on August 19, 1979, at Michigan International Speedway in Brooklyn, Michigan.

== Background ==
Michigan International Speedway is a four-turn superspeedway that is 2 miles (3.2 km) long. Opened in 1968, the track's turns are banked at eighteen degrees, while the 3,600-foot-long front stretch, the location of the finish line, is banked at twelve degrees. The back stretch, has a five degree banking and is 2,242 feet long.

== Race report ==
There were 36 American-born male drivers on the grid.

David Pearson, driving the Rod Osterlund No. 2 as a substitute Dale Earnhardt after his crash at Pocono, earned the pole position with a speed of 162.992 miles per hour (262.310 km/h) .Richard Petty defeated Buddy Baker by one second in essentially a fuel mileage race that determined whoever could preserve the most fuel. There were 21 lead changes and five caution flags for 35 laps; making the race three hours and four minutes long while the average speed was 130.376 miles per hour (209.820 km/h).

Blackie Wangerin would receive the last-place finish due to a crash with H.B. Bailey on lap 2 which resulted in Wangerin's car flipping outside of the track in Turn 3 which resulted in a lengthy red flag to rebuild the turns 3 and 4 guardrail. John Anderson got his only top five finish in his Cup debut.

Al Rudd, Jr. qualified for his second, and final, Cup race. At Pocono, he qualified 18th but when DiGard Racing's Darrell Waltrip crashed in post-qualifying practice, and under rules of the time, had to withdraw and DiGard leased his car for that race for points purposes. Rudd ran this car, which was rebuilt by DiGard for Pocono, for his only NASCAR Cop start, which he did with hia NASCAR Hall of Fame Class of 2025 brother Ricky, who drove for Wesley Donlavey that season.

The entire purse was $142,905 ($619,123.95 when adjusted for inflation). Notable crew chiefs for this race were Buddy Parrott, Joey Arrington, Kirk Shelmerdine, Darrell Bryant, Dale Inman, Harry Hyde, Bud Moore, Tim Brewer, and Jake Elder.

USAC Championship Trail standout Jan Opperman, in a car owned by Will Cronkite was the only driver to not qualify.

=== Qualifying ===
Grid	No.	Driver	Manufacturer	Owner
1	2	David Pearson	Chevrolet	Rod Osterlund
2	15	Bobby Allison	Ford	Bud Moore
3	21	Neil Bonnett	Mercury	Wood Brothers
4	44	Terry Labonte	Chevrolet	Billy Hagan
5	43	Richard Petty	Chevrolet	Petty Enterprises
6	27	Benny Parsons	Chevrolet	M.C. Anderson
7	72	Joe Millikan	Chevrolet	L.G. DeWitt
8	11	Cale Yarborough	Chevrolet	Junior Johnson
9	47	Harry Gant	Chevrolet	Jack Beebe
10	88	Darrell Waltrip	Chevrolet	DiGard

Failed to qualify: Jan Opperman (#96)

== Finishing order ==
Fin	St	Car #	Driver	Sponsor (Owner)	Car Make	Laps	Money	Status	Led	Points
1	5	43	Richard Petty	STP (Petty Enterprises)	Chevrolet	200	21100	running	9	180
2	11	28	Buddy Baker	W.I.N. (Harry Ranier)	Chevrolet	200	12425	running	115	180
3	6	27	Benny Parsons	Melling Tool (M.C. Anderson)	Chevrolet	200	12820	running	0	165
4	1	2	David Pearson	(Rod Osterlund)	Chevrolet	199	10215	running	0	160
5	20	08	John Anderson	Draime Race Engines (Russ Draime)	Chevrolet	199	4355	running	0	155
6	7	72	Joe Millikan	Appliance Wheels (L.G. DeWitt)	Chevrolet	199	7195	running	8	155
7	16	90	Ricky Rudd	Truxmore (Junie Donlavey)	Mercury	199	5320	running	0	146
8	28	30	Tighe Scott	Russ Togs (Walter Ballard)	Buick	197	4890	running	0	142
9	15	70	J.D. McDuffie	Bailey Excavating (J.D. McDuffie)	Chevrolet	197	4670	running	0	138
10	12	3	Richard Childress	CRC Chemicals (Richard Childress)	Oldsmobile	197	4550	running	0	134
11	13	17	Bill Elliott	Knutsons RV (George Elliott)	Mercury	195	4120	running	0	130
12	31	48	James Hylton	Palatine Automotive Parts (James Hylton)	Chevrolet	195	3850	running	0	127
13	34	42	Kyle Petty	STP (Petty Enterprises)	Dodge	195	1675	running	0	124
14	18	64	Tommy Gale	Sunny King Ford & Honda (Elmo Langley)	Ford	193	3130	running	0	121
15	29	0	John Kennedy	Avanti CB (John Kennedy)	Chevrolet	188	1490	running	0	
16	30	79	Frank Warren	Native Tan (Frank Warren)	Dodge	188	2725	running	0	115
17	8	11	Cale Yarborough	Busch (Junior Johnson)	Chevrolet	185	6270	engine	3	117
18	35	24	Cecil Gordon	Gordon Racing (Cecil Gordon)	Oldsmobile	183	2300	running	0	109
19	10	88	Darrell Waltrip	Gatorade (DiGard Racing)	Chevrolet	173	4775	running	0	106
20	22	67	Buddy Arrington	Hills Racing (Buddy Arrington)	Dodge	150	1965	engine	0	103
21	26	45	Baxter Price	Iron Peddlers (Baxter Price)	Oldsmobile	146	1920	running	0	100
22	19	52	Jimmy Means	Mr. Transmission (Jimmy Means)	Chevrolet	145	1875	running	0	97
23	2	15	Bobby Allison	Hodgdon/Moore (Bud Moore)	Ford	141	4935	engine	38	99
24	32	25	Ronnie Thomas	Stone's Cafeteria (Don Robertson)	Chevrolet	131	2785	overheating	0	91
25	9	47	Harry Gant	Race Hill Farm (Jack Beebe)	Chevrolet	129	875	clutch	5	93
26	4	44	Terry Labonte	Stratagraph (Billy Hagan)	Chevrolet	108	1475	engine	5	90
27	33	6	Marty Robbins	Robbins Racing (Marty Robbins)	Dodge	96	825	engine	0	82
28	17	40	D.K. Ulrich	Midwestern Farm Lines (D.K. Ulrich)	Buick	85	1300	running	0	79
29	14	05	Dick Brooks	Bearfinder (Nelson Malloch)	Chevrolet	81	785	exhaust	0	76
30	21	71	Dave Marcis	Transmissions Unlimited (Dave Marcis)	Chevrolet	67	765	engine	0	73
31	24	19	Lennie Pond	Belden Asphalt (Henley Gray)	Chevrolet	57	1250	overheating	0	70
32	23	22	Al Rudd, Jr.	Bill Lewis (Al Rudd)	Chevrolet	39	740	clutch	0	
33	3	21	Neil Bonnett	Purolator (Wood Brothers)	Mercury	28	1405	ignition	17	69
34	36	01	Earle Canavan	Scope Mount (Earle Canavan)	Dodge	23	720	engine	0	
35	25	36	H.B. Bailey	Caldwell Knapp Cadillac (H.B. Bailey)	Pontiac	2	710	crash	0	58
36	27	39	Blackie Wangerin	(Blackie Wangerin)	Mercury	2	700	crash	0	55

Failed to qualify
Name	Car #	Sponsor	Owner	Car
Jan Opperman	96		Will Cronkrite	Ford

== Standings after the race ==
Pos	Driver	Points	Differential
1	Darrell Waltrip	3352	0
2	Richard Petty	3197	-155
3	Cale Yarborough	3063	-289
4	Bobby Allison	3023	-329
5	Benny Parsons	2827	-525
6 ▲	Joe Millikan	2719	-633
7 ▼	Dale Earnhardt	2588	-764
8	Richard Childress	2524	-828
9	J.D. McDuffie	2510	-842
10	Buddy Arrington	2415	-937

Preceded by 1979 Talladega 500	NASCAR Winston Cup Series Season; 1979	Succeeded by 1979 Volunteer 500

Preceded by 1979 Virginia 500	Richard Petty's Career Wins; 1960-1984	Succeeded by 1979 CRC Chemicals 500
