= 1980 CRC Chemicals Rebel 500 =

Auto race held at Darlington Raceway in 1980

Race details
- Race 7 of 31 in the 1980 NASCAR Winston Cup Series season
- Layout of Darlington Raceway
- Date: April 13, 1980
- Official name: CRC Chemicals Rebel 500
- Location: Darlington Raceway (Darlington, South Carolina)
- Course: Permanent racing facility
- Course length: 1.366 miles (2.198 km)
- Distance: 189 laps, 258.174 mi (415.491 km)
- Scheduled distance: 367 laps, 501.322 mi (806.800 km)
- Weather: Warm with temperatures of 79.9 °F (26.6 °C); wind speeds of 9.9 miles per hour (15.9 km/h); exactly 0.31 inches (7.9 mm) of rain and hail interrupted the race
- Average speed: 112.397 miles per hour (180.885 km/h)
- Attendance: 45,000

Pole position
Driver	Benny Parsons	M.C. Anderson Racing

Most laps led
Driver	David Pearson	Ellington Racing
- Laps: 99

Winner
No. 1	David Pearson	Ellington Racing

Television in the United States
- Network: ABC
- Announcers: Keith Jackson; Jackie Stewart

Radio in the United States
- Radio: Universal Racing Network
- Booth announcers: Dick Jones, Dave Rogers
- Turn announcers: Hill Overton (backstretch), Bobby Johns

The 1980 CRC Chemicals Rebel 500 was a NASCAR Winston Cup Series racing event that was held on April 13, 1980, at Darlington Raceway in Darlington, South Carolina.

Forty-five thousand fans would attend the event, interrupted by 0.31 inches or 7.9 millimetres of precipitation, shortened to the shortest race in what is now the Cup Series by percentage in Darlington history (51.50%, 189 laps, which is six laps more than an official race, which would be 184 laps), as the race was shortened because of impending darkness (Darlington did not add lights until the 2004 Southern 500).

== Race report ==
There were 36 American-born drivers on the grid. A multiple-car crash where Ricky Rudd and Richard Petty collided in Turn 1 collected numerous cars, with Neil Bonnett never completing the first lap. David Pearson would earn his 105th win in the NASCAR Cup Series as he defeated Benny Parsons by three seconds, second all-time. Lake Speed would finish in the top ten only three races after his Cup Series debut. This would be the seventh Spring Darlington win for Pearson in addition to two victories in a row at Darlington for David Pearson. Hoss Ellington would receive his final NASCAR Winston Cup Series win for the #1 Hawaiian Tropic team.

Most of the cars in this race were Chevrolets. The race took two hours and twenty-three minutes to complete. Almost the entire "top ten" grid were driving Chevrolet vehicles. Harry Gant would achieve his first top five finish; marking a precedence for more than 100 top five finishes. Winnings for this race varied from $21,340 for the winner ($81,438 when adjusted for inflation) to $1,800 for the last-place finisher ($6,869 when adjusted for inflation). The total purse was $173,565 ($662,365 when adjusted for inflation).

The 105th win was Pearson's last NASCAR Cup Series win, with him winning consecutive races at Darlington for his final two wins.

Notable crew chiefs were Junie Donlavey, Joey Arrington, Darrell Bryant, Dale Inman, D.K. Ulrich, Waddell Wilson, Kirk Shelmerdine, Jake Elder among others.

=== Qualifying ===
Grid	No.	Driver	Manufacturer
1	27	Benny Parsons	Chevrolet
2	1	David Pearson	Chevrolet
3	11	Cale Yarborough	Chevrolet
4	40	Ricky Rudd	Chevrolet
5	2	Dale Earnhardt	Chevrolet
6	28	Buddy Baker	Chevrolet
7	43	Richard Petty	Chevrolet
8	71	Dave Marcis	Chevrolet
9	44	Terry Labonte	Chevrolet
10	47	Harry Gant	Chevrolet
11	21	Neil Bonnett	Mercury
12	15	Bobby Allison	Ford
13	68	Lennie Pond	Chevrolet
14	64	Tommy Gale	Ford
15	7	Dick Brooks	Chevrolet

== Finishing order ==
Section reference:

1. David Pearson (No. 1)
2. Benny Parsons (No. 27)
3. Harry Gant (No. 47)
4. Darrell Waltrip (No. 88)
5. Dick Brooks (No. 7)
6. Lennie Pond (No. 68)
7. Joe Millikan (No. 72)
8. Lake Speed (No. 66)
9. Richard Petty (No. 43)
10. Jody Ridley (No. 90)
11. Sterling Marlin (No. 5)
12. Cale Yarborough* (No. 11)
13. Bobby Wawak (No. 74)
14. Buddy Arrington (No. 67)
15. Tommy Gale (No. 64)
16. Roger Hamby (No. 17)
17. John Anderson (No. 19)
18. James Hylton (No. 48)
19. Ricky Rudd (No. 40)
20. Bill Elswick (No. 75)
21. Richard Childress (No. 3)
22. J.D. McDuffie (No. 70)
23. Dave Marcis* (No. 71)
24. Dick May (No. 99)
25. Slick Johnson (No. 53)
26. Ronnie Thomas* (No. 25)
27. Buck Simmons* (No. 12)
28. Jimmy Means (No. 25)
29. Dale Earnhardt* (No. 2)
30. Bobby Allison* (No. 15)
31. Baxter Price* (No. 45)
32. Terry Labonte* (No. 44)
33. Melvin Revis* (No. 59)
34. Cecil Gordon* (No. 82)
35. Buddy Baker* (No. 28)
36. Neil Bonnett* (No. 21)

* Driver failed to finish race

== Timeline ==
Section reference:
Some details sourced from Universal Racing Network broadcast, archived at the Appalachian State University Belk Library in Boone, North Carolina. Hank Schoolfield, who owned the Universal Racing Network, donated Universal Racing Network broadcasts from 1964 to 1982 to the school. The broadcasts are archived in MP3 format by the library.

- Start of race: David Pearson was leading the racing grid as the green flag was waved. Richard Petty and Ricky Rudd collide in Turn 1. Terry Labonte, Buddy Baker, James Hylton, and Neil Bonnett are collected, Bonnett is out, first Safety Car of race, officially scored as starting on Lap 2 (safety car rules prior to September 2003 rule change allowed cars to race to line for caution flag, and official start of caution is at the start of Lap 2).
- Lap 7: Restart
- Lap 14: Dale Earnhardt took over the lead from David Pearson.
- Lap 27: Safety Car, Melvin Revis engine failure (scored on Lap 28). Leaders pit. Lennie Pond scored as leader because of car's position at scoring line (prior to 1993 adoption of transponder-based timing, leading laps were based on position of cars past scoring line and hand scoring by NASCAR).
- Lap 29: Dave Marcis, who stayed out, scored as leader following pit stops.
- Lap 32: Marcis pits on one to go before restart, Dale Earnhardt took over the lead before restart. David Pearson, who was in the No. 2 Rod Osterlund car that Earnhardt was driving in this race at the last Darlington race because of injury, passes Earnhardt and is officially scored leader on Lap 33.
- Lap 34: Safety Car, Baxter Price engine failure (scored on Lap 35).
- Lap 41: Restart with Pearson in lead.
- Lap 86: Safety Car, Rain in Turn 1 and 2 (scored on Lap 87). Leaders pit, Lennie Pond took over the lead crossing scoring line for Lap 87.
- Lap 87: Because of Pond's position in relation to scoring line, he is scored leader while pitting. Cale Yarborough scored leader on Lap 88 after pit stops.
- Lap 90: Restart. Joe Milliken passes cars with a low line in Turn 1.
- Lap 93: Safety Car, Rain (scored on Lap 94).
- Lap 95: Restart. Yarborough keeps lead. Safety Car, Rain after less than one lap (scored as started on Lap 96). Parsons and Pearson race hard to reach scoring line.
- Lap 102: Restart.
- Lap 104: Safety Car, Rain. Engine failure for Dale Earnhardt, Sr. (scored on Lap 105).
- Lap 107: Red Flag, Weather. Cars parked next to pit wall. Rain delay was two hours, 18 minutes for rain, hail, and subsequent track drying. Safety Car situation after track drying. Radio broadcast notes sunset is 1853 but with heavy clouds, darkness could cause NASCAR to call the race considerably earlier if daylight is lacking (the circuit did not install floodlights until the 2004 Southern 500).
- Lap 119: NASCAR informs teams that they intend to restart in ten laps. Radio notes backstretch puddles.
- Lap 122: Track drying continues, leaders make pit stops. Benny Parsons took over the lead from Cale Yarborough.
- Lap 128: At 1750, NASCAR believes track is sufficiently dry for a restart with less than one hour before sunset. NASCAR will attempt to complete an official race by completing 56 laps before sunset, which would allow the race to reach official status on Lap 184 (half distance). However, if Safety Car situations continue to be called for incidents or debris, and the race fail to start Lap 185 before darkness, the race would continue Monday morning.
- Lap 135: Darrell Waltrip took over the lead from Benny Parsons.
- Lap 150: Benny Parsons took over the lead from Darrell Waltrip.
- Lap 156: Dave Marcis engine failure. There is no oil or debris from observers, so the race can continue under green flag conditions.
- Lap 158: David Pearson took over the lead from Benny Parsons.
- Lap 179: NASCAR sends teams the indication ten laps will remain once the leader crosses the start-finish line. The race will end at the conclusion of Lap 189.
  - Prior to the 2024 season, NASCAR would announce if because of darkness or curfew, when they would shorten the race at their discretion. Starting in 2024, a time-certain finish rule is announced when necessary where the race concludes two laps after the time-certain finish is imposed. The rule was imposed for the first time at the Chicago Street Race, where a time-certain 19.20 CDT finish was imposed.
- Lap 189: Chequered flag waves after 189 laps. David Pearson was pronounced the winner of the event.

== Standings after the race ==
Pos	Driver	Points	Differential
1	Dale Earnhardt	1106	0
2	Bobby Allison	1013	-93
3	Darrell Waltrip	1002	-104
4	Richard Petty	962	-144
5	Cale Yarborough	927	-179

Preceded by 1980 Valleydale Southeastern 500	NASCAR Winston Cup Series Season; 1980	Succeeded by 1980 Northeastern Bank 400
