= 1980 Holly Farms 400 =

Auto race held at North Wilkesboro Speedway in 1980

Race details
- Race 26 of 31 in the 1980 NASCAR Winston Cup Series season
- North Wilkesboro Speedway
- Date: September 21, 1980
- Official name: Holly Farms 400
- Location: North Wilkesboro Speedway, North Wilkesboro, North Carolina
- Course: Permanent racing facility
- Course length: 1.005 km (0.625 miles)
- Distance: 400 laps, 250 mi (402 km)
- Weather: Temperatures between 68 °F (20 °C) and 89.1 °F (31.7 °C); average wind speeds of 3.5 miles per hour (5.6 km/h)
- Average speed: 75.51 miles per hour (121.52 km/h)
- Attendance: 25,000

Pole position
Driver	Cale Yarborough	Junior Johnson & Associates

Most laps led
Driver	Bobby Allison	Bud Moore Engineering
- Laps: 166

Winner
No. 15	Bobby Allison	Bud Moore Engineering

Television in the United States
- Network: untelevised
- Announcers: unknown

The 1980 Holly Farms 400 was a NASCAR Winston Cup Series racing event that took place on September 21, 1980, at North Wilkesboro Speedway in North Wilkesboro, North Carolina. Its total prize purse was finalized as $105,515 ($402,670 when adjusted for inflation); with the winner taking home $17,725 ($67,643 when adjusted for inflation).

By 1980, NASCAR had completely stopped tracking the year model of all the vehicles and most teams did not take stock cars to the track under their own power anymore.

The NASCAR Winston Cup Series was also plagued with top teams running big engines and finishing in third place to avoid inspection around the early-1980s.

== Background ==
During the 1980s, North Wilkesboro Speedway was noticeably lagging behind other speedways on the NASCAR circuit, but the fans were more interested in the great racing action between the legendary drivers. Enoch's focus was more on the fans' enjoyment rather than on building large suites and new facilities. Attendance and total purse for races at the track were the lowest in NASCAR, but the events continued to sell out and attract more fans each year.

== Race report ==
Just months prior to the race, a new kind of asphalt was placed but did not get a chance to completely solve the disintegration problem. The racetrack developed a slick surface; that made qualifying speeds 2 miles per hour (3.2 km/h) slower and the cars more likely to spin and crash with each other. Conditions for the race would become very poor by the standards of the early 1980s; causing the pace car to crash into a parked car getting back into pit lane.

Richard Childress, the current owner of Richard Childress Racing, would compete as a driver. There were 30 American-born drivers on the racing grid; no foreigners or women competed in this race. Bobby Allison managed to defeat Darrell Waltrip by half a second after more than three hours of racing. Cale Yarborough would acquire the pole position through driving his qualifying session at an incredible top speed of almost 112 miles per hour (180 km/h).

Bobby Allison scores his last win for Bud Moore and his last in a Ford Motor Company product. This was his fourth win of 1980. Future 2-time Whelen Southern Modified Tour champion Junior Miller scores his best Winston Cup finish in 13th. Slick Johnson scores a career-best 8th place finish, he'd later match it at Rockingham three races later.

This was the last win for Ford at North Wilkesboro until the 1990 Tyson Holly Farms 400.

D.K. Ulrich received credit for the last-place finish due to an oil pressure problem on the second lap of this 400-lap race. Nine drivers failed to complete the race; including J.D. McDuffie, Lake Speed and Lennie Pond. Bub Strickler would retire from NASCAR after this race. Dale Earnhardt would maintain his championship points lead after this event.

Two months after the race, the track was treated again. The disintegration issue managed to solve itself throughout the harsh winter months and was completely prepared for the 1981 season.

Notable crew chiefs who participated in the race were Junie Donlavey, Buddy Parrott, Joey Arrington, Darrell Bryant, Dale Inman, Bud Moore, Tim Brewer, and Kirk Shelmerdine.

=== Qualifying ===
Grid	No.	Driver	Manufacturer	Owner
1	11	Cale Yarborough	Chevrolet	Junior Johnson
2	15	Bobby Allison	Ford	Bud Moore
3	68	Lennie Pond	Chevrolet	Jim Testa
4	27	Benny Parsons	Chevrolet	M.C. Anderson
5	88	Darrell Waltrip	Chevrolet	DiGard Racing
6	71	Dave Marcis	Chevrolet	Dave Marcis
7	47	Harry Gant	Chevrolet	Jack Beebe
8	2	Dale Earnhardt	Chevrolet	Rod Osterlund
9	44	Terry Labonte	Chevrolet	Billy Hagan
10	90	Jody Ridley	Ford	Junie Donlavey
11	79	Junior Miller	Chevrolet	Junior Miller
12	40	D.K. Ulrich	Chevrolet	D.K. Ulrich
13	25	Ronnie Thomas	Chevrolet	Don Robertson
14	43	Richard Petty	Chevrolet	Petty Enterprises
15	7	Lake Speed	Chevrolet	Nelson Malloch
16	3	Richard Childress	Chevrolet	Richard Childress
17	70	J.D. McDuffie	Chevrolet	J.D. McDuffie
18	19	John Anderson	Chevrolet	Henley Gray
19	24	Cecil Gordon	Oldsmobile	Cecil Gordon
20	17	Roger Hamby	Chevrolet	Roger Hamby
21	52	Jimmy Means	Chevrolet	Jimmy Means
22	64	Tommy Gale	Ford	Elmo Langley
23	07	Jeff McDuffie	Buick	J.D. McDuffie
24	53	Slick Johnson	Chevrolet	J.D. Johnson
25	67	Buddy Arrington	Dodge	Buddy Arrington

== Top 10 finishers ==
Pos	Grid	No.	Driver	Manufacturer	Laps	Laps led	Points	Time/Status
1	2	15	Bobby Allison	Ford	400	166	185	3:18:39
2	5	88	Darrell Waltrip	Chevrolet	400	131	175	+0.5 seconds
3	6	71	Dave Marcis	Chevrolet	400	4	170	Lead lap under green flag
4	7	47	Harry Gant	Chevrolet	399	0	160	+1 lap
5	8	2	Dale Earnhardt	Chevrolet	399	0	155	+1 lap
6	4	27	Benny Parsons	Chevrolet	399	0	150	+1 lap
7	9	44	Terry Labonte	Chevrolet	399	0	146	+1 lap
8	24	53	Slick Johnson	Chevrolet	391	0	142	+9 laps
9	10	90	Jody Ridley	Ford	390	0	138	+10 laps
10	1	11	Cale Yarborough	Chevrolet	389	54	139	+11 laps

== Standings after the race ==
Pos	Driver	Points	Differential
1	Dale Earnhardt	3847	0
2 ▲	Cale Yarborough	3757	-90
3 ▼	Richard Petty	3741	-106
4	Benny Parsons	3708	-139
5	Darrell Waltrip	3662	-185
6	Bobby Allison	3537	-310
7	Jody Ridley	3273	-574
8	Harry Gant	3242	-605
9	Richard Childress	3125	-722
10 ▲	Dave Marcis	3099	-748

Preceded by 1980 CRC Chemicals 500	NASCAR Winston Cup Series Season; 1980	Succeeded by 1980 Old Dominion 500
