= 1980 Coca-Cola 500 =

Auto race held at Pocono International Raceway in 1980

Race details
- Race 19 of 31 in the 1980 NASCAR Winston Cup Series season
- Neil Bonnett in the winner's circle after winning the 1980 Coca-Cola 500
- Date: July 27, 1980
- Official name: Coca-Cola 500
- Location: Pocono International Raceway, Long Pond, Pennsylvania
- Course: Permanent racing facility
- Course length: 2.500 miles (3.400 km)
- Distance: 200 laps, 500 mi (804 km)
- Weather: Warm with temperatures of 79 °F (26 °C); wind speeds of 6.6 miles per hour (10.6 km/h)
- Average speed: 124.395 miles per hour (200.194 km/h)
- Attendance: 75,000

Pole position
Driver	Cale Yarborough	Junior Johnson & Associates
- Time: less than 60.000 seconds

Most laps led
Driver	Neil Bonnett	Wood Brothers Racing
- Laps: 59

Winner
No. 21	Neil Bonnett	Wood Brothers Racing

Television in the United States
- Network: ABC
- Announcers: Chris Economaki; Jackie Stewart

The 1980 Coca-Cola 500 was a NASCAR Winston Cup Series race that took place on July 27, 1980, at Pocono International Raceway in Long Pond, Pennsylvania.

== Background ==
Pocono Raceway is one of six superspeedways to hold NASCAR races; the others are Daytona International Speedway, Michigan International Speedway, Auto Club Speedway, Indianapolis Motor Speedway and Talladega Superspeedway. The standard track at Pocono Raceway is a three-turn superspeedway that is 2.5 miles (4.0 km) long. The track's turns are banked differently; the first is banked at 14°, the second turn at 8° and the final turn with 6°. However, each of the three straightaways are banked at 2°.

== Summary ==
It took four hours and one minute to complete 200 laps; Neil Bonnett defeated Buddy Baker by six-tenths of a second. This was the only NASCAR oval where typical lap times for the race were over a minute, although qualifying times for this track were less than 60 seconds.

There were 19 lead changes in the final 56 laps, with nearly all the lead changes occurring between Baker and Bonnett. The two drivers exchanged the lead nine times in the last 22 laps before Bonnett took the lead for good with four laps remaining.

Bonnett's victory would mark both his first victory of the 1980 NASCAR Winston Cup Series season and the penultimate one for Mercury as a brand in NASCAR Cup competition.

There were forty American born drivers in the race. Travis Tiller achieved the last-place finish of the race due to a problem in the ignition system during the pace laps of the race. Five cautions slowed the race for 26 laps while 49 lead changes took place from the green flag to the checkered flag. The other drivers who finished in the top ten were: Cale Yarborough, Dale Earnhardt, Harry Gant, Terry Labonte, Kyle Petty, Dave Marcis, Richard Childress (now the owner of Richard Childress Racing), and Ricky Rudd. Most of the drivers competed with the Chevrolets. Kenny Hemphill, Tim Richmond (12th-place finish), and Bob Riley would start their NASCAR Cup Series careers at this race while Janet Guthrie and Nelson Oswald would make this their last races. Guthrie was forced out of the race when her engine failed after 134 laps.

Richard Petty broke his neck as a result of a crash on lap 57.

He managed to successfully rehab from this injury.

Notable crew chiefs in this race were Junie Donlavey, Joey Arrington, Darel Dieringer, Dale Inman, Darrell Bryant, D.K. Ulrich, Harry Hyde, Waddell Wilson, and Kirk Shelmerdine.

== Standings after the race ==
Pos	Driver	Points
1	Dale Earnhardt	2902
2	Richard Petty	2758
3	Cale Yarborough	2724
4	Benny Parsons	2627
5 ▲	Darrell Waltrip	2574
6 ▼	Bobby Allison	2570
7	Jody Ridley	2455
8	Richard Childress	2330
9	Harry Gant	2291
10 ▲	Terry Labonte	2237

Preceded by 1980 Busch Nashville 420	NASCAR Winston Cup Series Season; 1980	Succeeded by 1980 Talladega 500

Preceded by 1979	Coca-Cola 500 races 1980	Succeeded by none
