= 1980 CRC Chemicals 500 =

Auto race held at Dover International Speedway in 1980

Race details
- Race 25 of 31 in the 1980 NASCAR Winston Cup Series season
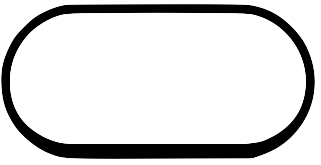
- Layout of Dover International Speedway
- Date: September 14, 1980
- Official name: CRC Chemicals 500
- Location: Dover Downs International Speedway, Dover, Delaware
- Course: Permanent racing facility
- Course length: 1.609 km (1.000 miles)
- Distance: 500 laps, 500.0 mi (804.6 km)
- Weather: Very hot with temperatures reaching up to 88 °F (31 °C); wind speeds up to 7 miles per hour (11 km/h)
- Average speed: 116.024 miles per hour (186.723 km/h)

Pole position
Driver	Cale Yarborough	Junior Johnson & Associates

Most laps led
Driver	Darrell Waltrip	DiGard Motorsports
- Laps: 264

Winner
No. 88	Darrell Waltrip	DiGard Motorsports

Television in the United States
- Network: untelevised
- Announcers: none

The 1980 CRC Chemicals 500 was a NASCAR Winston Cup Series racing event that took place on September 14, 1980, at Dover Downs International Speedway, Dover, Delaware. The NASCAR Winston Cup Series was also plagued with top teams running big engines and finishing in third place to avoid inspection around the early-1980s.

This would be the last of 26 wins for Darrell Waltrip at DiGard, Inc.. Darrell won many races but the team struggled with reliability issues which cost Darrell every year except 1979. Darrell had a contract with DiGard that ran through 1982 but with the help of his father-in-law, Junior Johnson, and sponsor Mountain Dew he was able to get out of the contract at the end of 1980 and finally win his first Winston Cup title in 1981.

== Background ==
Dover Downs International Speedway, now called Dover International Speedway, is one of five short tracks to hold NASCAR races; the others are Bristol Motor Speedway, Richmond International Raceway, Martinsville Speedway, and Phoenix International Raceway. The NASCAR race makes use of the track's standard configuration, a four-turn short track oval that is 1 mile (1.6 km) long. The track's turns are banked at twenty-four degrees, and both the front stretch (the location of the finish line) and the backstretch are banked at nine degrees.

== Race report ==
Twenty-nine lead changes were noticed amongst 11 different drivers. Kenny Hemphill, in his penultimate start, leads a Cup race for the only time.

A combination of racing veterans and relative newcomers to the sport made the 1980 NASCAR Cup Series racing amongst the closest ever seen within the 1970s and 1980s decades. The 1980 NASCAR season was also a rare period in time where the "little teams" could compete almost on a completely equal level against the "big organizations" of stock car racing. Today, independent organizations like NEMCO Motorsports and Robby Gordon Motorsports have a very harsh degree of difficulty to overcome when trying to overtake powerhouses like Hendrick Motorsports, Richard Childress Racing, and Joe Gibbs Racing. The approximate time it took to complete the race was four hours and fourteen minutes using 500 laps of racing. Eight yellow flags slowed the race for 39 laps while Darrell Waltrip defeated Harry Gant by almost ½ of a second. The attendance for this paved oval track race was 35,500 live audience members. Waltrip would earn $22,900 just by winning this race ($87,392 when adjusted for inflation).

Frank Warren would retire from NASCAR after this race along with Eddie Dickerson. Meanwhile, John Callis and Joel Stowe used this racing event to make their respective NASCAR debuts. Steve Gray was the last-place driver with a head gasket incident; earning only a meager prize amount of $450 for his 35 laps of racing ($1,717 when adjusted for inflation). Speeds for this race were: 116.024 miles per hour (186.723 km/h) as the average racing speed and 137.583 miles per hour (221.418 km/h) for the pole position winner Cale Yarborough. This would be one of the few races where Bobby Allison didn't win at the track that is now known as Dover International Speedway. Dale Earnhardt would have the NASCAR Winston Cup Series championship after this race. This would eventually lead to his 1980 NASCAR championship.

=== Top 10 finishers ===
Pos	Grid	No.	Driver	Manufacturer	Laps	Led	Winnings	Points	Time/Status
1	2	88	Darrell Waltrip	Chevrolet	500	264	$22,900	185	4:18:34
2	10	47	Harry Gant	Chevrolet	500	140	$12,930	175	+0.47 seconds
3	3	28	Buddy Baker	Chevrolet	500	16	$8,150	170	Lead lap under green flag
4	1	11	Cale Yarborough	Chevrolet	499	30	$10,700	165	+1 lap
5	6	27	Benny Parsons	Chevrolet	499	1	$8,425	160	+1 lap
6	8	21	Neil Bonnett	Mercury	499	5	$3,175	155	+1 lap
7	13	12	Donnie Allison	Chevrolet	498	34	$2,325	151	+2 laps
8	5	68	Lennie Pond	Chevrolet	493	0	$2,175	Unknown	+7 laps
9	16	90	Jody Ridley	Ford	491	0	$4,980	138	+9 laps
10	21	25	Ronnie Thomas	Chevrolet	489	0	$4,235	134	+11 laps

== Standings after the race ==
Pos	Driver	Points	Differential
1	Dale Earnhardt	3692	0
2	Richard Petty	3632	-60
3	Cale Yarborough	3618	-74
4	Benny Parsons	3558	-134
5	Darrell Waltrip	3487	-205
6	Bobby Allison	3352	-340
7	Jody Ridley	3135	-557
8 ▲	Harry Gant	3082	-610
9 ▼	Richard Childress	3019	-673
10	Terry Labonte	2937	-755

Preceded by 1980 Capital City 400	NASCAR Winston Cup Series Season; 1980	Succeeded by 1980 Holly Farms 400
