= 1980 Firecracker 400 =

Auto race held at Daytona Speedway in 1980

Race details
- Race 17 of 31 in the 1980 NASCAR Winston Cup Series season
- Track map of Daytona International Speedway.
- Date: July 4, 1980
- Official name: Firecracker 400
- Location: Daytona Speedway, Daytona Beach, Florida
- Course: Permanent racing facility
- Course length: 4.023 km (2.500 miles)
- Distance: 160 laps, 400 mi (643 km)
- Weather: Temperatures of 88.9 °F (31.6 °C); wind speeds of 10.1 miles per hour (16.3 km/h)
- Average speed: 173.473 miles per hour (279.178 km/h)
- Attendance: 54,000

Pole position
Driver	Cale Yarborough	Junior Johnson & Associates

Most laps led
Driver	Bobby Allison	Bud Moore Engineering
- Laps: 63

Winner
No. 15	Bobby Allison	Bud Moore Engineering

Television in the United States
- Network: ABC
- Announcers: Keith Jackson

The 1980 Firecracker 400 was a NASCAR Winston Cup Series racing event that took place on July 4, 1980, at Daytona International Speedway in Daytona Beach, Florida. The NASCAR Winston Cup Series was also plagued with top teams running big engines and finishing in third place to avoid inspection around the early-1980s.

One hundred and sixty laps of racing would result in a final win for Mercury in the Cup Series before the manufacturer left NASCAR due to rule changes reducing the wheelbase of the tires from 110 inches (9.2 ft) to 105 inches (8.8 ft).

== Race report ==
Bobby Allison was the final driver to win in a Mercury for the Ford Motor Company; he beat David Pearson by six car lengths. Pearson had a strong runner-up performance here despite leading only three laps. Other notable competitors included Dale Earnhardt, Richard Petty, Richard Childress and Bill Elliott. Out of forty participants, eleven competitors failed to finish the race. Cale Yarborough was credited for finishing last place with an overheated engine. The race took two hours, eighteen minutes, and eleven seconds to complete. Phil Finney had a violent crash off turn 4 and inflicted terminal damage to his vehicle on lap 152.

All drivers were born in the United States of America. The Ford and Mercury cars of the early-1980s weren't exactly aerodynamic wonders compared to the General Motors cars. Also this was the era before Ernie Elliott figured out how to make the 351 Cleveland rev in the same high ranges that the Chevys were running without breaking valve springs. By the late-1980s and early-1990s, the Ford and Mercury cars could compete on a more equal basis with the General Motor cars (especially the Chevrolet cars that would go on to dominate NASCAR in the 21st century).

Safety regulations made within the 1980s and 1990s would slow down the speed of vehicles in both the Firecracker 400 and the Daytona 500. The average speed for this race was a race record 173.473 miles per hour (279.178 km/h) while the pole position speed was 194.670 miles per hour (313.291 km/h). Three cautions slowed the race for 11 laps. Fifty-four thousand spectators were in attendance. Out of the forty drivers in the grid, ten of them failed to finish the race due to car problems. On the day after the race, Lennie Pond made a celebrity appearance at a Burger King in nearby South Daytona; entertaining customers for three hours in the days before celebrity appearances were mainstream in the racing community.

Rick Wilson made his NASCAR debut in this event while Phil Finney and John Greenwood retired from NASCAR racing after this race.

=== Finishing order ===
Section reference:

1. Bobby Allison
2. David Pearson†
3. Dale Earnhardt†
4. Buddy Baker†
5. Richard Petty
6. Benny Parsons†
7. Jody Ridley
8. Richard Childress
9. John Anderson†
10. Buddy Arrington
11. Lennie Pond
12. Bill Elliott
13. Ricky Rudd
14. Coo Coo Marlin†
15. Rick Wilson
16. Harry Gant
17. Ronnie Thomas
18. Steve Moore
19. Donnie Allison
20. Phil Finney*
21. John Greenwood
22. Don Whittington
23. J.D. McDuffie†
24. James Hylton†
25. Jim Vandiver
26. Jimmy Means
27. Roger Hamby
28. Tommy Gale†
29. Cecil Gordon†
30. Marty Robbins*†
31. Darrell Waltrip*
32. Terry Labonte*
33. Dave Marcis*
34. Neil Bonnett*†
35. Bruce Hill*
36. Tighe Scott*
37. Chuck Bown*
38. Lake Speed*
39. Connie Saylor*†
40. Cale Yarborough*

* Driver failed to finish race
† signifies that the driver is known to be deceased

== Standings after the race ==
Pos	Driver	Points	Differential
1	Dale Earnhardt	2557	0
2	Richard Petty	2529	-28
3	Cale Yarborough	2397	-160
4 ▲	Bobby Allison	2354	-203
5	Benny Parsons	2349	-208
6 ▼	Darrell Waltrip	2319	-238
7	Jody Ridley	2204	-353
8	Harry Gant	2055	-502
9 ▲	Richard Childress	2054	-503
10 ▼	Terry Labonte	1985	-572

Preceded by 1980 Gabriel 400	NASCAR Winston Cup Series Season; 1980	Succeeded by 1980 Busch Nashville 420

Preceded by 1979	Firecracker 400 races 1980	Succeeded by 1981
