= John Anderson (racing driver) =

American racing driver (1944–1986)

- Born: April 20, 1944; Warren, Michigan, U.S.
- Died: July 31, 1986 (aged 42); Charlotte, North Carolina, U.S.
- Cause of death: Road accident

NASCAR Cup Series career
- 32 races run over 5 years
- Best finish: 24th (1980)
- First race: 1979 Champion Spark Plug 400 (Michigan)
- Last race: 1983 Miller High Life 500 (Charlotte)
Wins	Top tens	Poles
0	3	0

NASCAR O'Reilly Auto Parts Series career
- 5 races run over 2 years
- Best finish: 63rd (1982)
- First race: 1982 Goody's 300 (Daytona)
- Last race: 1983 Miller Time 300 (Charlotte)
Wins	Top tens	Poles
0	2	0

John Anderson (April 20, 1944 – July 31, 1986) was an American stock car racing driver. He drove in the NASCAR Winston Cup Series between 1979 and 1983, posting a best finish of fifth.

== Career ==
Born April 20, 1944, in Warren, Michigan, Anderson first drove in racing competition at Flat Rock Speedway in 1965, winning the Michigan Figure 8 racing championship in 1967. He was the Automobile Racing Club of America (ARCA) Rookie-of-the-Year in 1968.

During the late 1960s and 1970s, Anderson was successful in competition, winning a number of track championships, along with several ARCA and American Speed Association races. He moved up to United States Auto Club (USAC) sprint car and midget car racing in 1977, and ran his first NASCAR race, in the modified series, at Charlotte Motor Speedway in the fall of that year, winning the pole for the event.

In 1979, Anderson made his first NASCAR Winston Cup Series start, scoring a fifth-place finish in his first race, at Michigan International Speedway. He ran the majority of the 1980 season for a number of teams, scoring two top-ten finishes; towards the end of the year he was hired by John Rebham to drive for his team; in 1981, driving an Oldsmobile, he was involved in an accident, in which his car got airborne and flipped over multiple times before landing upside down, during the UNO Twin 125 qualifying races for the Daytona 500. Shortly afterwards, Rebham, impatient for results and under pressure from his sponsors, fired Anderson, replacing him with Donnie Allison. Anderson would only run a few additional races in the Winston Cup Series and Budweiser Late Model Sportsman Series before retiring.

Anderson won over 200 races of various types during his racing career. He was killed in a road crash on Interstate 85 near Charlotte, North Carolina on July 31, 1986, being survived by his wife Mary Ann and two children.

Anderson was inducted into the Michigan Motor Sports Hall of Fame in 2002.
