= 1980 Richmond 400 =

Auto race held at Richmond Fairgrounds Raceway in 1980

Race details
- Race 3 of 31 in the 1980 NASCAR Winston Cup Series season
- Layout of Richmond Speedway
- Date: February 24, 1980
- Official name: Richmond 400
- Location: Richmond Fairgrounds Raceway, Richmond, Virginia
- Course: Permanent racing facility
- Course length: 0.542 miles (0.872 km)
- Distance: 400 laps, 216.8 mi (348.9 km)
- Weather: Chilly with temperatures of 66 °F (19 °C); wind speeds of 8 miles per hour (13 km/h)
- Average speed: 67.703 mph (108.957 km/h)
- Attendance: 17,000

Pole position
Driver	Darrell Waltrip	DiGard

Most laps led
Driver	Darrell Waltrip	DiGard
- Laps: 148

Winner
No. 88	Darrell Waltrip	DiGard

Television in the United States
- Network: untelevised
- Announcers: none

The 1980 Richmond 400 was a NASCAR Winston Cup Series racing event that took place on February 24, 1980, at Richmond Fairgrounds Raceway (now Richmond Raceway) in Richmond, Virginia.

The NASCAR Winston Cup Series was also plagued with top teams running big engines and finishing in third place to avoid inspection around the early-1980s.

== Background ==
In 1953, Richmond International Raceway began hosting the Grand National Series with Lee Petty winning that first race in Richmond. The original track was paved in 1968. In 1988, the track was re-designed into its present D-shaped configuration

The name for the raceway complex was "Strawberry Hill" until the Virginia State Fairgrounds site was bought out in 1999 and renamed the "Richmond International Raceway".

== Race report ==
There were 35 American-born male drivers on the grid. Darrell Waltrip defeated Bobby Allison by 1.2 seconds in front of 17,000 people. Nine caution flags for 72 laps along with 19 different lead changes resulted in a race that lasted three hours and twelve minutes. Millikan flipped over the guardrail in Turn 3 after two other cars in front of him got together; he would eventually bow out of the race at lap 101.

While Waltrip would earn the pole position with a qualifying speed of 93.695 miles per hour (150.787 km/h) in his #88 Chevrolet Malibu vehicle, the average speed of the actual race was 67.703 miles per hour (108.957 km/h) Baxter Price achieved the last-place finish of the race due to a crash on lap 45 out of the 400 laps that day. Richard Childress (racing for himself at Richard Childress Racing) would be the last driver to actually finish the race. He would drive an Oldsmobile as opposed to the Chevrolet vehicles that he would own today.

Bill Hollar ends up sidelined by a mechanical gremlin as he makes his final NASCAR Winston Cup start. He'd attempt a few races later in the 1980s but didn't qualify for any of them.

Notable crew chiefs that fully participated in this race included Junie Donlavey, Joey Arrington, Darrell Bryant, Dale Inman, Bud Moore, Tim Brewer, Kirk Shelmerdine, Jake Elder among others.

Tommy Houston would make his NASCAR debut here while Joey Arrington would retire here. Joe Booher would make his best career finish here.

=== Top 10 finishers ===
Pos	Grid	No.	Driver	Manufacturer	Laps	Winnings	Laps led	Points	Time/Status
1	1	88	Darrell Waltrip	Chevrolet	400	$17,800	148	185	3:12:08
2	5	15	Bobby Allison	Ford	400	$10,975	127	175	+1.2 seconds
3	3	43	Richard Petty	Chevrolet	400	$9,375	70	170	Lead lap under green flag
4	10	71	Dave Marcis	Chevrolet	400	$4,310	16	165	Lead lap under green flag
5	11	2	Dale Earnhardt	Chevrolet	398	$6,550	0	155	+2 laps
6	15	67	Buddy Arrington	Dodge	392	$3,360	0	150	+8 laps
7	31	48	James Hylton	Chevrolet	385	$2,940	0	146	+15 laps
8	14	24	Cecil Gordon	Oldsmobile	382	$2,780	0	142	+18 laps
9	7	70	J.D. McDuffie	Chevrolet	380	$2,610	0	138	+20 laps
10	20	74	Bobby Wawak	Chevrolet	377	$1,150	0	134	+23 laps

== Timeline ==
Section reference:

- Start of race: Darrell Waltrip started the race with the pole position.
- Lap 34: Bobby Allison took over the lead from Darrell Waltrip.
- Lap 42: Joe Millikan took over the lead from Bobby Allison.
- Lap 43: Tommy Houston took over the lead from Joe Millikan.
- Lap 52: Dick Brooks, Jimmy Means, and Baxter Price suddenly became victims of a terminal crash.
- Lap 53: Harry Gant took over the lead from Tommy Houston.
- Lap 63: Oil pump issues managed to eliminate Benny Parsons from the event.
- Lap 81: Richard Petty took over the lead from Harry Gant.
- Lap 93: Bobby Allison took over the lead from Richard Petty.
- Lap 103: Richard Petty took over the lead from Bobby Allison.
- Lap 104: Joe Millikan became the victim of a terminal crash.
- Lap 105: Dave Marcis took over the lead from Richard Petty.
- Lap 112: Richard Petty took over the lead from Dave Marcis.
- Lap 125: The engine on Ronny Thomas' vehicle stopped working in a proper manner.
- Lap 155: Darrell Waltrip took over the lead from Richard Petty.
- Lap 195: Cale Yarbrough became a victim of a terminal crash.
- Lap 197: An axle came loose off Terry Labonte's vehicle.
- Lap 198: Bobby Allison took over the lead from Darrell Waltrip.
- Lap 245: Dave Marcis took over the lead from Bobby Allison.
- Lap 249: Bobby Allison took over the lead from Dave Marcis.
- Lap 269: Dave Marcis took over the lead from Bobby Allison.
- Lap 274: Bobby Allison took over the lead from Dave Marcis.
- Lap 281: Bill Hollar's vehicle developed ignition problems.
- Lap 293: Darrell Waltrip took over the lead from Bobby Allison.
- Lap 346: Bobby Allison took over the lead from Darrell Waltrip.
- Lap 369: Richard Petty took over the lead from Bobby Allison.
- Lap 382: Darrell Waltrip took over the lead from Richard Petty.
- Finish: Darrell Waltrip was officially declared the winner of the event.

== Standings after the race ==
Pos	Driver	Points	Differential
1	Dale Earnhardt	490	0
2 ▲	Bobby Allison	459	-31
3 ▲	Richard Petty	433	-57
4 ▲	Darrell Waltrip	413	-77
5 ▼	Terry Labonte	387	-103
6 ▲	Dave Marcis	379	-111
7 ▼	Richard Childress	371	-119
8 ▲	James Hylton	361	-129
9 ▼	Jody Ridley	358	-132
10 ▲	J.D. McDuffie	338	-152

Preceded by 1980 Daytona 500	NASCAR Winston Cup Series Season; 1980	Succeeded by 1980 Carolina 500
