= 1980 NASCAR Winston Cup Series =

American motorsport season

Seasons
- ← 1979 1981 →

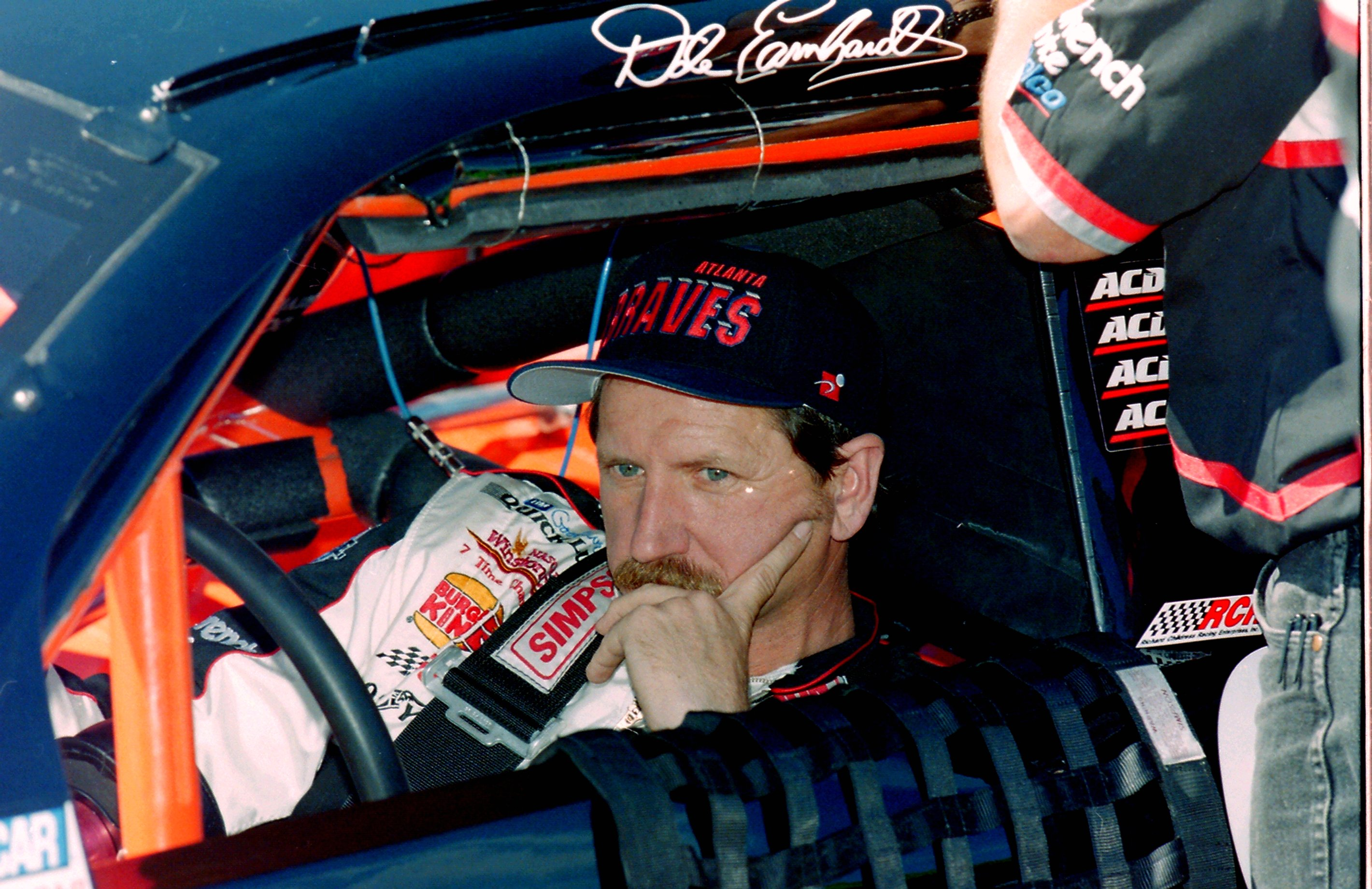
Dale Earnhardt, the 1980 champion

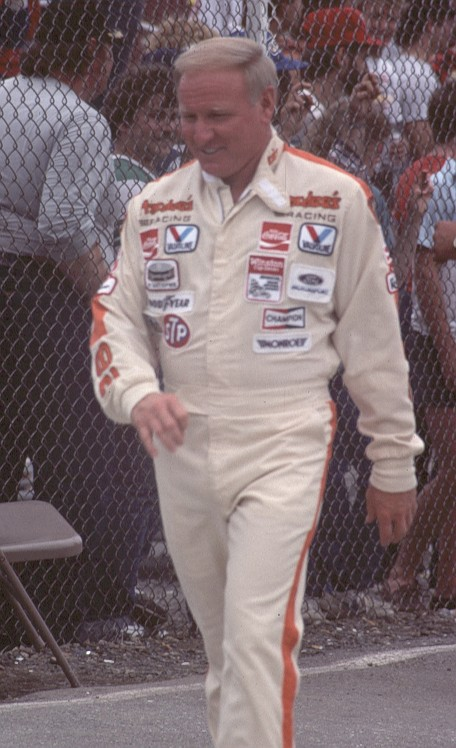
Cale Yarborough finished second in the standings

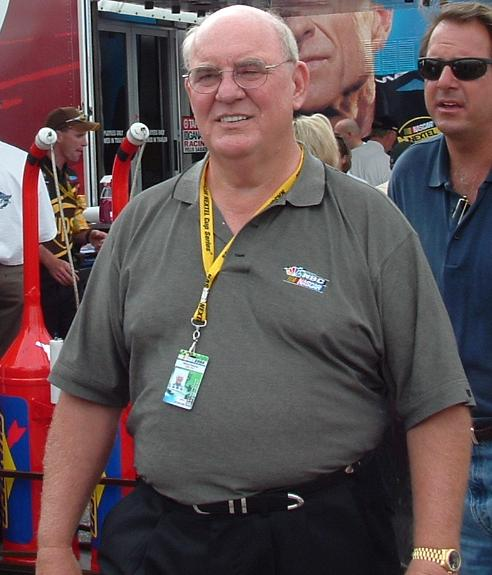
Benny Parsons finished third in the standings

The 1980 NASCAR Winston Cup Series was the 32nd season of professional stock car racing in the United States and the 9th modern-era NASCAR Cup season. It was the final year with the Gen 2 car. The season began on Sunday, January 13 and ended on Sunday, November 15. Dale Earnhardt won his first Winston Cup championship in his first full-season after missing couple races in 1979, winning by 19 points over Cale Yarborough. Jody Ridley was crowned NASCAR Rookie of the Year.

== Teams and drivers ==
| Team | Make | No. | Driver | Car Owner | Crew Chief |
|---|---|---|---|---|---|
| A. J. Foyt Enterprises | Oldsmobile Cutlass | 51 | A. J. Foyt | A. J. Foyt | |
| A. J. Foyt Enterprises | Oldsmobile Cutlass | 51 | Don Whittington | A. J. Foyt | |
| Arrington Racing | Dodge Magnum | 67 | Buddy Arrington | Buddy Arrington | Joey Arrington |
| Arrington Racing | Dodge Magnum | 77 | Dick May | Buddy Arrington | |
| Arrington Racing | Dodge Magnum | 77 | Eddie Dickerson | Buddy Arrington | |
| Arrington Racing | Dodge Magnum | 97 | Eddie Dickerson | Buddy Arrington | |
| B&B Racing | Buick Century | 03 | Jimmy Finger | Don Bierschwale | |
| Ballard Racing | Oldsmobile Cutlass | 30 | Tighe Scott | Walter Ballard | Harry Hyde |
| Billie Harvey Racing | Chevrolet Monte Carlo Oldsmobile Cutlass | 87 | Billie Harvey | Billie Harvey | |
| Billie Harvey Racing | Chevrolet Monte Carlo Oldsmobile Cutlass | 87 | Gary Balough | Billie Harvey | |
| Billy Matthews Racing | Chevrolet Monte Carlo | 41 | Dick Brooks | Billy Matthews | |
| Borneman Motorsports | Chevrolet Monte Carlo | 81 | John Borneman | John Borneman | |
| Bud Moore Engineering | Ford Thunderbird | 15 | Bobby Allison | Bud Moore | Bud Moore |
| DiGard Motorsports | Chevrolet Monte Carlo | 88 | Darrell Waltrip | Bill Gardner | Buddy Parrott; Jake Elder |
| Donlavey Racing | Ford Thunderbird | 90 | Jody Ridley | Junie Donlavey | |
| Ellington Racing | Chevrolet Monte Carlo; Oldsmobile Cutlass | 1 | David Pearson | Hoss Ellington | Runt Pittman |
| Elliott Racing | Mercury Cougar | 9 | Bill Elliott11 | George Elliott | Ernie Elliott |
| G. C. Spencer Racing | Chevrolet Monte Carlo Oldsmobile Cutlass 1 | 4 | Gary Baker 2 | G. C. Spencer | |
| G. C. Spencer Racing | Chevrolet Monte Carlo Oldsmobile Cutlass 1 | 4 | Connie Saylor 5 | G. C. Spencer | |
| Gordon Racing | Oldsmobile Cutlass | 24 | Cecil Gordon | Cecil Gordon | |
| Gray Racing | Chevrolet Monte Carlo | 19 | John Anderson (R) | Henley Gray | |
| Hagan Racing | Chevrolet Monte Carlo | 44 | Terry Labonte | Billy Hagan | Darrell Bryant |
| Halpern Enterprises | Oldsmobile Cutlass Chevrolet Monte Carlo | 02 | Donnie Allison | Joel Halpern | |
| Halpern Enterprises | Oldsmobile Cutlass Chevrolet Monte Carlo | 02 | Chuck Bown | Joel Halpern | Harold Fagan |
| Hamby Motorsports | Chevrolet Monte Carlo | 17 | Roger Hamby | Roger Hamby | |
| Hollar Racing | Chevrolet Monte Carlo | 99 | Dick May | Bill Hollar | |
| Hylton Racing | Chevrolet Monte Carlo | 48 | James Hylton | James Hylton | |
| Johnson Racing | Chevrolet Monte Carlo | 53 | Slick Johnson | J. D. Johnson | |
| Junior Johnson & Associates | Chevrolet Monte Carlo | 11 | Cale Yarborough | Junior Johnson | Tim Brewer |
| Junior Miller Racing | Chevrolet Monte Carlo | 79 | Junior Miller | Junior Miller | |
| Kennie Childers Racing | Chevrolet Monte Carlo | 12 | Donnie Allison | Kennie Childers | |
| Kieper Racing | Dodge Magnum | 93 | Chuck Bown | John Kieper | |
| Kieper Racing | Chevrolet Monte Carlo | 98 | Hershel McGriff | John Kieper | |
| Langley Racing | Ford Thunderbird | 64 | Tommy Gale | Elmo Xey | |
| M. C. Anderson Racing | Chevrolet Monte Carlo | 27 | Benny Parsons | M. C. Anderson | David Ifft |
| Marcis Auto Racing | Chevrolet Monte Carlo | 71 | Dave Marcis | Dave Marcis | |
| McDuffie Racing | Chevrolet Monte Carlo | 70 | J. D. McDuffie | J. D. McDuffie | |
| Means Racing | Chevrolet Monte Carlo | 52 | Jimmy Means | Jimmy Means | |
| Nelson Malloch Racing | Ford Thunderbird | 7 | Dick Brooks | Nelson Malloch | |
| Nelson Malloch Racing | Ford Thunderbird | 7 | Ricky Rudd | Nelson Malloch | |
| Nelson Malloch Racing | Ford Thunderbird | 7 | Lake Speed | Nelson Malloch | |
| Osterlund Racing | Chevrolet Monte Carlo | 2 | Dale Earnhardt | Rod Osterlund | Jake Elder; Doug Richert |
| Petty Enterprises | Chevrolet Monte Carlo | 42 | Kyle Petty 16 | Richard Petty | Maurice Petty |
| Petty Enterprises | Chevrolet Monte Carlo | 43 | Richard Petty | Richard Petty | Dale Inman |
| Price Racing | Chevrolet Monte Carlo | 45 | Baxter Price | Baxter Price | Robert Beadle |
| Price Racing | Chevrolet Monte Carlo | 45 | Charlie Chamblee | Baxter Price | Robert Beadle |
| Price Racing | Chevrolet Monte Carlo | 45 | Jimmy Means | Baxter Price | Robert Beadle |
| Price Racing | Chevrolet Monte Carlo | 45 | Roy Smith | Baxter Price | Robert Beadle |
| Price Racing | Chevrolet Monte Carlo | 45 | Joel Stowe | Baxter Price | Robert Beadle |
| Race Hill Farm Team | Chevrolet Monte Carlo | 47 | Harry Gant | Jack Beebe | Bob Johnson |
| RahMoc Enterprises | Chevrolet Monte Carlo | 75 | Bill Elswick 12 | Bob Rahilly | Butch Mock |
| RahMoc Enterprises | Chevrolet Monte Carlo | 75 | Joe Millikan 3 | Bob Rahilly | Butch Mock |
| RahMoc Enterprises | Chevrolet Monte Carlo | 75 | John Anderson 7 | Bob Rahilly | Butch Mock |
| RahMoc Enterprises | Chevrolet Monte Carlo | 75 | Chuck Bown 1 | Bob Rahilly | Butch Mock |
| RahMoc Enterprises | Chevrolet Monte Carlo | 75 | Harry Gant 3 | Bob Rahilly | Butch Mock |
| RahMoc Enterprises | Chevrolet Monte Carlo | 75 | Kyle Petty 1 | Bob Rahilly | Butch Mock |
| RahMoc Enterprises | Chevrolet Monte Carlo | 75 | Lennie Pond 2 | Bob Rahilly | Butch Mock |
| RahMoc Enterprises | Chevrolet Monte Carlo | 75 | Jim Sauter 1 | Bob Rahilly | Butch Mock |
| Ranier-Lundy Racing | Oldsmobile Cutlass | 28 | Buddy Baker | Harry Ranier | Waddell Wilson; Buddy Parrott |
| Richard Childress Racing | Chevrolet Monte Carlo | 3 | Richard Childress | Richard Childress | |
| Robertson Racing | Chevrolet Monte Carlo | 25 | Ronnie Thomas | Don Robertson | |
| Speed Racing | Chevrolet Monte Carlo | 66 | Lake Speed (R) | Lake Speed | |
| Testa Racing | Chevrolet Monte Carlo Oldsmobile Cutlass | 68 | Chuck Bown 1 | Jim Testa | Ron Kelly |
| Testa Racing | Chevrolet Monte Carlo Oldsmobile Cutlass | 68 | Lennie Pond 14 | Jim Testa | Ron Kelly |
| Testa Racing | Chevrolet Monte Carlo Oldsmobile Cutlass | 68 | John Greenwood 2 | Jim Testa | Ron Kelly |
| Ulrich Racing | Chevrolet Monte Carlo Buick Century | 40 | Bill Whittington 2 | D. K. Ulrich | |
| Ulrich Racing | Chevrolet Monte Carlo Buick Century | 40 | Joe Booher 1 | D. K. Ulrich | |
| Ulrich Racing | Chevrolet Monte Carlo Buick Century | 40 | Ricky Rudd 3 | D. K. Ulrich | D. K. Ulrich |
| Ulrich Racing | Chevrolet Monte Carlo Buick Century | 40 | Dick May 2 | D. K. Ulrich | |
| Ulrich Racing | Chevrolet Monte Carlo Buick Century | 40 | D. K. Ulrich 10 | D. K. Ulrich | |
| Ulrich Racing | Chevrolet Monte Carlo Buick Century | 40 | Dick Skillen 1 | D. K. Ulrich | |
| Ulrich Racing | Chevrolet Monte Carlo Buick Century | 40 | Mike Alexander 1 | D. K. Ulrich | |
| Ulrich Racing | Chevrolet Monte Carlo Buick Century | 40 | J. D. McDuffie 1 | D. K. Ulrich | |
| Ulrich Racing | Chevrolet Monte Carlo Buick Century | 40 | Tommy Gale1 | D. K. Ulrich | |
| Ulrich Racing | Chevrolet Monte Carlo Buick Century | 40 | Lennie Pond 1 | D. K. Ulrich | |
| Ulrich Racing | Chevrolet Monte Carlo Buick Century | 40 | Sterling Marlin 1 | D. K. Ulrich | |
| Ulrich Racing | Chevrolet Monte Carlo Buick Century | 40 | Tim Richmond 5 | D. K. Ulrich | D. K. Ulrich |
| Ulrich Racing | Chevrolet Monte Carlo Buick Century | 40 | Harry Dinwiddle 1 | D. K. Ulrich | |
| Ulrich Racing | Chevrolet Monte Carlo Buick Century | 40 | Stan Barrett 3 | D. K. Ulrich | |
| Warren Racing | Dodge Magnum Chevrolet Monte Carlo | 79 | Dick May 2 | Frank Warren | |
| Warren Racing | Dodge Magnum Chevrolet Monte Carlo | 79 | Jim Hurlbert 1 | Frank Warren | |
| Warren Racing | Dodge Magnum Chevrolet Monte Carlo | 79 | Joey Arrington 1 | Frank Warren | |
| Warren Racing | Dodge Magnum Chevrolet Monte Carlo | 79 | Frank Warren 7 | Frank Warren | |
| Warren Racing | Dodge Magnum Chevrolet Monte Carlo | 79 | Travis Tiller 1 | Frank Warren | |
| Warren Racing | Dodge Magnum Chevrolet Monte Carlo | 79 | Junior Miller 5 | Frank Warren | |
| Warren Racing | Dodge Magnum Chevrolet Monte Carlo | 79 | Joe Booher 2 | Frank Warren | |
| Warren Racing | Dodge Magnum Chevrolet Monte Carlo | 79 | Marty Robbins 1 | Frank Warren | |
| Wawak Racing | Chevrolet Monte Carlo; Buick Century | 74 | Joe Booher 2 | Bobby Wawak | |
| Wawak Racing | Chevrolet Monte Carlo; Buick Century | 74 | Bobby Wawak 19 | Bobby Wawak | |
| Wawak Racing | Chevrolet Monte Carlo; Buick Century | 74 | Bob Riley 1 | Bobby Wawak | |
| Wawak Racing | Chevrolet Monte Carlo; Buick Century | 74 | Stuart Hoffman 1 | Bobby Wawak | |
| Wawak Racing | Chevrolet Monte Carlo; Buick Century | 74 | Henry Jones 1 | Bobby Wawak | |
| Wood Brothers Racing | Mercury Cougar | 21 | Neil Bonnett | Glen Wood | Leonard Wood |

== Season recap ==
| No. | Date | Race title | Track | Winning driver |
|---|---|---|---|---|
| 1 | January 13; January 19 | Winston Western 500 | Riverside International Raceway | Darrell Waltrip |
| | February 10 | Busch Clash | Daytona International Speedway | Dale Earnhardt |
| | February 14 | 125 Mile Qualifying Races | Daytona International Speedway | Neil Bonnett |
| | February 14 | 125 Mile Qualifying Races | Daytona International Speedway | Donnie Allison |
| 2 | February 17 | Daytona 500 | Daytona International Speedway | Buddy Baker |
| 3 | February 24 | Richmond 400 | Richmond Fairgrounds Raceway | Darrell Waltrip |
| 4 | March 9 | Carolina 500 | North Carolina Motor Speedway | Cale Yarborough |
| 5 | March 16 | Atlanta 500 | Atlanta International Raceway | Dale Earnhardt |
| 6 | March 30 | Valleydale Southeastern 400 | Bristol International Raceway | Dale Earnhardt |
| 7 | April 13 | CRC Rebel 500 | Darlington International Raceway | David Pearson |
| 8 | April 20 | Northwestern Bank 400 | North Wilkesboro Speedway | Richard Petty |
| 9 | April 27 | Virginia 500 | Martinsville Speedway | Darrell Waltrip |
| 10 | May 4 | Winston 500 | Alabama International Motor Speedway | Buddy Baker |
| 11 | May 10 | Music City 420 | Nashville Speedway | Richard Petty |
| 12 | May 18 | Mason-Dixon 500 | Dover Downs International Speedway | Bobby Allison |
| 13 | May 25 | World 600 | Charlotte Motor Speedway | Benny Parsons |
| 14 | June 1 | NASCAR 400 | Texas World Speedway | Cale Yarborough |
| 15 | June 8 | Warner W. Hodgdon 400 | Riverside International Raceway | Darrell Waltrip |
| 16 | June 15 | Gabriel 400 | Michigan International Speedway | Benny Parsons |
| 17 | July 4 | Firecracker 400 | Daytona International Speedway | Bobby Allison |
| 18 | July 12 | Busch Nashville 420 | Nashville Speedway | Dale Earnhardt |
| 19 | July 27 | Coca-Cola 500 | Pocono Raceway | Neil Bonnett |
| 20 | August 3 | Talladega 500 | Alabama International Motor Speedway | Neil Bonnett |
| 21 | August 17 | Champion Spark Plug 400 | Michigan International Speedway | Cale Yarborough |
| 22 | August 23 | Busch Volunteer 500 | Bristol International Raceway | Cale Yarborough |
| 23 | September 1 | Southern 500 | Darlington International Raceway | Terry Labonte |
| 24 | September 7 | Capital City 400 | Richmond Fairgrounds Raceway | Bobby Allison |
| 25 | September 14 | CRC Chemicals 500 | Dover Downs International Speedway | Darrell Waltrip |
| 26 | September 21 | Holly Farms 400 | North Wilkesboro Speedway | Bobby Allison |
| 27 | September 28 | Old Dominion 500 | Martinsville Speedway | Dale Earnhardt |
| 28 | October 5 | National 500 | Charlotte Motor Speedway | Dale Earnhardt |
| 29 | October 19 | American 500 | North Carolina Motor Speedway | Cale Yarborough |
| 30 | November 2 | Atlanta Journal 500 | Atlanta International Raceway | Cale Yarborough |
| 31 | November 15 | Los Angeles Times 500 | Ontario Motor Speedway | Benny Parsons |

== Races ==
=== Winston Western 500 ===
The Winston Western 500 was held on January 13 at Riverside International Raceway. Darrell Waltrip won the pole, and would claim his second straight win in Riverside's NASCAR season-opener. He took the win with crew chief Buddy Parrott, who had been fired from DiGard Racing immediately following the Los Angeles Times 500 the previous November but rehired at the start of January.

Top ten results

1. #88 - Darrell Waltrip
2. #2 - Dale Earnhardt
3. #43 - Richard Petty
4. #72 - Joe Millikan
5. #73 - Bill Schmitt
6. #3 - Richard Childress
7. #44 - Terry Labonte
8. #40 - Bill Whittington
9. #55 - Don Whittington
10. #25 - Ronnie Thomas

=== Daytona 500 ===
The 22nd Daytona 500 was held on February 17 at Daytona International Speedway. Buddy Baker won the pole. Baker ended a career-long drought in the 500 as he dominated, winning in his 18th attempt. Darrell Waltrip blew his engine early and angrily ripped the DiGard Racing team in postrace interviews. With an average speed of 177.602 mph, the 1980 race remains the fastest Daytona 500 in history.

Top ten results

1. #28 - Buddy Baker
2. #15 - Bobby Allison
3. #21 - Neil Bonnett
4. #2 - Dale Earnhardt
5. #27 - Benny Parsons
6. #44 - Terry Labonte
7. #1 - Donnie Allison
8. #14 - Sterling Marlin
9. #75 - Lennie Pond
10. #90 - Jody Ridley

=== Richmond 400 ===
The Richmond 400 was held on February 24 at Richmond Fairgrounds Raceway. Darrell Waltrip won the pole. Waltrip, Bobby Allison, and Richard Petty combined to lead 345 laps. Petty rallied from a mid-race spin to lead until Waltrip grabbed the lead for the final nineteen laps.

Top ten results

1. #88 - Darrell Waltrip
2. #15 - Bobby Allison
3. #43 - Richard Petty
4. #71 - Dave Marcis
5. #2 - Dale Earnhardt
6. #67 - Buddy Arrington
7. #48 - James Hylton
8. #24 - Cecil Gordon
9. #70 - J.D. McDuffie
10. #74 - Bobby Wawak

=== Carolina 500 ===
The Carolina 500 was held on March 9 at North Carolina Motor Speedway. Darrell Waltrip won the pole. Cale Yarborough drove a backup Oldsmobile to the win, while Benny Parsons survived a hard crash in Turn One.

Top ten results

1. #11 - Cale Yarborough
2. #43 - Richard Petty
3. #2 - Dale Earnhardt
4. #88 - Darrell Waltrip
5. #1 - Donnie Allison
6. #21 - Neil Bonnett
7. #15 - Bobby Allison
8. #47 - Harry Gant
9. #71 - Dave Marcis
10. #44 - Terry Labonte

=== Atlanta 500 ===
The Atlanta 500 was held on March 16 at Atlanta International Raceway. Buddy Baker won the pole. Cale Yarborough, Bobby Allison, and Donnie Allison dominated the first 300 miles of the race as sophomore Dale Earnhardt clawed from 31st into contention; Allison and Earnhardt were side by side for the lead when Donnie was hit by Terry Labonte and hit the wall in Turn Three. Cale broke in the final 60 laps as Earnhardt took the win; finishing second was rookie Rusty Wallace in his first career race.

Top ten results

1. #2 - Dale Earnhardt
2. #16 - Rusty Wallace
3. #15 - Bobby Allison
4. #71 - Dave Marcis
5. #7 - Dick Brooks
6. #90 - Jody Ridley
7. #28 - Buddy Baker
8. #11 - Cale Yarborough
9. #70 - J.D. McDuffie
10. #53 - Slick Johnson

=== Valleydale Southeastern 500 ===
The Southeastern 500 was held on March 30 at Bristol International Speedway. Cale Yarborough won the pole. Earnhardt passed Yarborough and led the final 135 laps for his second straight win.

Top ten results

1. #2 - Dale Earnhardt
2. #88 - Darrell Waltrip
3. #15 - Bobby Allison
4. #27 - Benny Parsons
5. #11 - Cale Yarborough
6. #72 - Joe Millikan
7. #47 - Harry Gant
8. #43 - Richard Petty
9. #71 - Dave Marcis
10. #44 - Terry Labonte

=== CRC Chemicals Rebel 500 ===
The Rebel 500 was held on April 13 at Darlington Raceway. Benny Parsons won the pole. Rain shortened the race after halfway as David Pearson, replacing Donnie Allison in Hoss Ellington's car, took his 105th and final career win. Neil Bonnett crashed out on the opening lap and Dale Earnhardt led fifteen laps but fell out with engine failure.

Top ten results

1. #1 - David Pearson
2. #27 - Benny Parsons
3. #47 - Harry Gant
4. #88 - Darrell Waltrip
5. #7 - Dick Brooks
6. #68 - Lennie Pond
7. #72 - Joe Millikan
8. #66 - Lake Speed
9. #43 - Richard Petty
10. #90 - Jody Ridley

=== Northwestern Bank 400 ===
The Northwestern Bank 400 was held on April 10 at North Wilkesboro Speedway. Bobby Allison won the pole.

Top ten results

1. #43 - Richard Petty
2. #47 - Harry Gant
3. #15 - Bobby Allison
4. #11 - Cale Yarborough
5. #27 - Benny Parsons
6. #2 - Dale Earnhardt
7. #90 - Jody Ridley
8. #42 - Kyle Petty
9. #53 - Slick Johnson
10. #72 - Joe Millikan

=== Virginia 500 ===
The Virginia 500 was held on April 27 at Martinsville Speedway. Darrell Waltrip won the pole. In an effort to save money for race teams, NASCAR banned tire changes under caution on short tracks. Waltrip led 303 laps from the pole to the win.

Top ten results

1. #88 - Darrell Waltrip
2. #27 - Benny Parsons
3. #43 - Richard Petty
4. #11 - Cale Yarborough
5. #72 - Joe Millikan
6. #21 - Neil Bonnett
7. #90 - Jody Ridley
8. #71 - Dave Marcis
9. #53 - Slick Johnson
10. #67 - Buddy Arrington

=== Winston 500 ===
The Winston 500 was held on May 4 at Alabama International Motor Speedway. David Pearson won the pole. On a newly repaved surface, Buddy Baker ran down Dale Earnhardt with two laps to go for the win, but was informed on his way to postrace interviews he would be replaced in the Ranier Racing car in 1981.

Top ten results

1. #28 - Buddy Baker
2. #2 - Dale Earnhardt
3. #1 - David Pearson
4. #68 - Lennie Pond
5. #30 - Tighe Scott
6. #11 - Cale Yarborough
7. #66 - Lake Speed
8. #27 - Benny Parsons
9. #7 - Dick Brooks
10. #90 - Jody Ridley

=== Music City USA 420 ===
The Music City 420 was held on May 10 at Nashville Fairgrounds Speedway. Cale Yarborough won the pole. Yarborough cut a tire but could not pit under yellow to change it; as a result Richard Petty took his eighth win at the Nashville Fairgrounds. Petty and Cale were critical of NASCAR's new rule for short tracks banning tire changes under yellow. Petty's win was also Chevrolet's 100th manufacturer win in NASCAR.

Top ten results

1. #43 - Richard Petty
2. #27 - Benny Parsons
3. #11 - Cale Yarborough
4. #88 - Darrell Waltrip
5. #15 - Bobby Allison
6. #2 - Dale Earnhardt
7. #44 - Terry Labonte
8. #90 - Jody Ridley
9. #47 - Harry Gant
10. #40 - Mike Alexander

=== Mason-Dixon 500 ===
The Mason-Dixon 500 was held on May 18 at Dover Downs International Speedway. Cale Yarborough won the pole. Bobby Allison won after leading 126 laps, edging Richard Petty for his first win of the season. Allison was critical of the Ford racecars he was running, saying "We still need a Chevy for the other tracks."

Top ten results

1. #15 - Bobby Allison
2. #43 - Richard Petty
3. #28 - Buddy Baker
4. #47 - Harry Gant
5. #44 - Terry Labonte
6. #90 - Jody Ridley
7. #40 - Dick May
8. #3 - Richard Childress
9. #24 - Cecil Gordon
10. #2 - Dale Earnhardt

=== World 600 ===
The World 600 was held on May 25 at Charlotte Motor Speedway. Cale Yarborough won the pole. The race ran over seven hours thanks to fourteen yellows for crashes on the newly paved surface and two rain delays lasting two hours. The lead changed 47 times as Benny Parsons out-dueled Darrell Waltrip; they swapped the lead eight times in the final twenty laps. Dale Earnhardt's crash at Lap 275 with David Pearson and Cale Yarborough combined with Richard Petty's fourth cut Earnhardt's point lead to under 50; crew chief Jake Elder quit the team after the race, citing an attitude change with Earnhardt and also conflict with Rod Osterlund and team manager Roland Wlodyka ("Rod tells me one thing and Roland another. I tell Roland what we need and he says we cannot do that.....I had no authority to get the people I need.")

Top ten results

1. #27 - Benny Parsons
2. #88 - Darrell Waltrip
3. #44 - Terry Labonte
4. #43 - Richard Petty
5. #21 - Neil Bonnett
6. #1 - David Pearson
7. #42 - Kyle Petty
8. #89 - Jim Vandiver
9. #22 - Ricky Rudd
10. #67 - Buddy Arrington

=== NASCAR 400 ===
The NASCAR 400 was held on June 1 at Texas World Speedway. Cale Yarborough won the pole. Yarborough led 110 laps from the pole and edged Richard Petty, while point leader Dale Earnhardt led 54 laps but finished a distant ninth in his first race with Doug Richert as crew chief. Benny Parsons led 30 laps but overheated and fell out.

Top ten results

1. #11 - Cale Yarborough
2. #43 - Richard Petty
3. #15 - Bobby Allison
4. #88 - Darrell Waltrip
5. #44 - Terry Labonte
6. #3 - Richard Childress
7. #71 - Dave Marcis
8. #75 - Harry Gant
9. #2 - Dale Earnhardt
10. #48 - James Hylton

=== Warner W. Hodgdon 400 ===
The Warner W. Hodgdon 400 was held on June 8 at Riverside International Raceway. Cale Yarborough won the pole for the fifth consecutive race.

Top ten results

1. #88 - Darrell Waltrip
2. #21 - Neil Bonnett
3. #27 - Benny Parsons
4. #11 - Cale Yarborough
5. #2 - Dale Earnhardt
6. #71 - Dave Marcis
7. #75 - Harry Gant
8. #43 - Richard Petty
9. #70 - J.D. McDuffie
10. #24 - Cecil Gordon

=== Gabriel 400 ===
The Gabriel 400 was held on June 15 at Michigan International Speedway. Benny Parsons won the pole. Parsons, who grew up in the Detroit area, won at Michigan for the only time in his career. Darrell Waltrip fell out with engine failure, and following the race crew chief Buddy Parrott was fired; a fight ensued between Parrott and Robert Yates at the DiGard shop when the team returned home. Parrott publicly blamed Waltrip for his firing, saying "I'll die before I ever turn another wrench on a Darrell Waltrip car." Parrott was promptly hired to Ranier Racing.

Top ten results

1. #27 - Benny Parsons
2. #11 - Cale Yarborough
3. #28 - Buddy Baker
4. #21 - Neil Bonnett
5. #43 - Richard Petty
6. #90 - Jody Ridley
7. #42 - Kyle Petty
8. #15 - Bobby Allison
9. #9 - Bill Elliott
10. #30 - Tighe Scott

=== Firecracker 400 ===
The Firecracker 400 was held on July 4 at Daytona International Speedway. Cale Yarborough won the pole. Bobby Allison edged Earnhardt and Pearson before a scary crash erupted off Turn Four as Phil Finney plowed into an earthen bank and flew twenty feet into the air before landing at the pit road entrance. The lead changed 41 times.

Top ten results

1. #15 - Bobby Allison
2. #1 - David Pearson
3. #2 - Dale Earnhardt
4. #28 - Buddy Baker
5. #43 - Richard Petty
6. #27 - Benny Parsons
7. #90 - Jody Ridley
8. #3 - Richard Childress
9. #75 - John Anderson
10. #67 - Buddy Arrington

=== Busch Nashville 420 ===
The Busch Nashville 420 was held on July 12 at Nashville Speedway. Cale Yarborough won the pole.

Top ten results

1. #2 - Dale Earnhardt
2. #11 - Cale Yarborough
3. #27 - Benny Parsons
4. #88 - Darrell Waltrip
5. #43 - Richard Petty
6. #15 - Bobby Allison
7. #40 - Sterling Marlin
8. #90 - Jody Ridley
9. #3 - Richard Childress
10. #67 - Buddy Arrington

=== Coca-Cola 500 ===
The Coca-Cola 500 was held on July 27 at Pocono Raceway. Cale Yarborough won the pole, his eighth pole in the last nine races. Neil Bonnett survived a physical last lap with Buddy Baker and Yarborough. The lead changed 50 times, but the story of the race was a bad wreck on Lap 57 as Richard Petty, holding the lead, broke a wheel entering the track's Tunnel Turn, shot into the wall, and bounced into the path of traffic, where he was hit in the driver's side door by Darrell Waltrip. Petty suffered a broken neck and his title chances effectively ended.

Top ten results

1. #21 - Neil Bonnett
2. #28 - Buddy Baker
3. #11 - Cale Yarborough
4. #2 - Dale Earnhardt
5. #47 - Harry Gant
6. #44 - Terry Labonte
7. #42 - Kyle Petty
8. #71 - Dave Marcis
9. #3 - Richard Childress
10. #7 - Ricky Rudd

=== Talladega 500 ===
The Talladega 500 was held on August 3 at Alabama International Motor Speedway. Buddy Baker won the pole. Neil Bonnett fought off a last-lap challenge from Dale Earnhardt, Cale Yarborough, and Benny Parsons for the win, the second in a row for Wood Brothers Racing and the final win for the Mercury automobile brand.

Top ten results

1. #21 - Neil Bonnett
2. #11 - Cale Yarborough
3. #2 - Dale Earnhardt
4. #27 - Benny Parsons
5. #47 - Harry Gant
6. #3 - Richard Childress
7. #9 - Bill Elliott
8. #66 - Lake Speed
9. #42 - Kyle Petty
10. #19 - Dick May

=== Champion Spark Plug 400 ===
The Champion Spark Plug 400 was held on August 17 at Michigan International Speedway. Buddy Baker won the pole. Darrell Waltrip crashed during practice and had to purchase the Joel Halpern Chevrolet to run the 400 at Michigan International Speedway; it was the second time in two seasons Waltrip had to drive another car after his primary DiGard entry was knocked out before the race; Waltrip led 67 laps but a late caution allowed Cale Yarborough to catch up and storm to the win. Following the race Waltrip stated he was "fed up" with the DiGard situation, saying "I fight the same battles every day." Richard Petty ran the entire race despite his broken neck and finished fifth.

Top ten results

1. #11 - Cale Yarborough
2. #21 - Neil Bonnett
3. #12 - Donnie Allison
4. #02 - Darrell Waltrip
5. #43 - Richard Petty
6. #28 - Buddy Baker
7. #15 - Bobby Allison
8. #27 - Benny Parsons
9. #9 - Bill Elliott
10. #77 - Kenny Hamphill

=== Busch Volunteer 500 ===
The Busch Volunteer 500 was held on August 23 at Bristol International Speedway. Cale Yarborough won the pole.

Top ten results

1. #11 - Cale Yarborough
2. #2 - Dale Earnhardt
3. #88 - Darrell Waltrip
4. #43 - Richard Petty
5. #27 - Benny Parsons
6. #15 - Bobby Allison
7. #71 - Dave Marcis
8. #68 - Lennie Pond
9. #3 - Richard Childress
10. #40 - D.K. Ulrich

=== Southern 500 ===
The 31st Southern 500 was held on September 1 at Darlington Raceway. Darrell Waltrip won the pole. In a wild final five laps David Pearson rocketed from midpack into the lead and held off Dale Earnhardt and Benny Parsons, then with two to go all three crashed in Turn Two in oil from a blown engine; Pearson limped to the race-deciding yellow, but Terry Labonte edged Pearson by a bumper to score his first career victory.

Top ten results

1. #44 - Terry Labonte
2. #1 - David Pearson
3. #47 - Harry Gant
4. #27 - Benny Parsons
5. #21 - Neil Bonnett
6. #15 - Bobby Allison
7. #2 - Dale Earnhardt
8. #71 - Dave Marcis
9. #43 - Richard Petty
10. #41 - Dick Brooks

=== Capital City 400 ===
The Capital City 400 was held on September 7 at Richmond Fairgrounds Raceway. Cale Yarborough won the pole.

Top ten results

1. #15 - Bobby Allison
2. #43 - Richard Petty
3. #68 - Lennie Pond
4. #2 - Dale Earnhardt
5. #90 - Jody Ridley
6. #88 - Darrell Waltrip
7. #71 - Dave Marcis
8. #44 - Terry Labonte
9. #29 - Dave Dion
10. #27 - Benny Parsons

=== CRC Chemicals 500 ===
The CRC Chemicals 500 was held on September 14 at Dover Downs International Speedway. Cale Yarborough won the pole.

Top ten results

1. #88 - Darrell Waltrip
2. #47 - Harry Gant
3. #28 - Buddy Baker
4. #11 - Cale Yarborough
5. #27 - Benny Parsons
6. #21 - Neil Bonnett
7. #12 - Donnie Allison
8. #68 - Lennie Pond
9. #90 - Jody Ridley
10. #25 - Ronnie Thomas

=== Holly Farms 400 ===
The Holly Farms 400 was held on September 21 at North Wilkesboro Speedway. Cale Yarborough won the pole.

Top ten results

1. #15 - Bobby Allison
2. #88 - Darrell Waltrip
3. #71 - Dave Marcis
4. #47 - Harry Gant
5. #2 - Dale Earnhardt
6. #27 - Benny Parsons
7. #44 - Terry Labonte
8. #53 - Slick Johnson
9. #90 - Jody Ridley
10. #11 - Cale Yarborough

=== Old Dominion 500 ===
The Old Dominion 500 was held on September 28 at Martinsville Speedway. Buddy Baker won the pole.

Top ten results

1. #2 - Dale Earnhardt
2. #28 - Buddy Baker
3. #11 - Cale Yarborough
4. #27 - Benny Parsons
5. #71 - Dave Marcis
6. #12 - Donnie Allison
7. #44 - Terry Labonte
8. #67 - Buddy Arrington
9. #90 - Jody Ridley
10. #48 - James Hylton

=== National 500 ===
The National 500 was held on October 5 at Charlotte Motor Speedway. Buddy Baker won the pole. Dale Earnhardt edged Cale Yarborough and Baker amid an increasingly bitter public contract battle between Darrell Waltrip and his team owner, Bill Gardner, a battle that also involved Junior Johnson, who asserted DiGard had attempted to hire several of Johnson's crewmen out from under him. Waltrip fought for the lead in the first 100 laps but lost a lap when a sway bar bolt broke off an A arm; he kept battling to get his lap back but crashed with Benny Parsons, who was eligible for a $100,000 bonus for winning the race.

Top ten results

1. #2 - Dale Earnhardt
2. #11 - Cale Yarborough
3. #28 - Buddy Baker
4. #22 - Ricky Rudd
5. #12 - Donnie Allison
6. #9 - Bill Elliott
7. #7 - Lake Speed
8. #90 - Jody Ridley
9. #42 - Kyle Petty
10. #41 - Dick Brooks

=== American 500 ===
The American 500 was held on October 19 at North Carolina Motor Speedway. Donnie Allison won the pole. Cale Yarborough led 167 laps en route to his fifth win of the season, but the key development of the race was Dale Earnhardt, whose 18th-place finish reduced his point lead to just 44 with two races to go.

Top ten results

1. #11 - Cale Yarborough
2. #47 - Harry Gant
3. #88 - Darrell Waltrip
4. #44 - Terry Labonte
5. #90 - Jody Ridley
6. #71 - Dave Marcis
7. #3 - Richard Childress
8. #53 - Slick Johnson
9. #48 - James Hylton
10. #25 - Ronnie Thomas

=== Atlanta Journal 500 ===
The Atlanta Journal 500 was held on November 2 at Atlanta International Raceway. Bobby Allison won the pole. An early accident eliminated the Allison brothers and Cale Yarborough dominated to the win. Dale Earnhardt lost a lap and crowded Cale for a prolonged stretch; his point lead over Yarborough was now just 29 points.

Top ten results

1. #11 - Cale Yarborough
2. #21 - Neil Bonnett
3. #2 - Dale Earnhardt
4. #28 - Buddy Baker
5. #44 - Terry Labonte
6. #90 - Jody Ridley
7. #68 - Lennie Pond
8. #25 - Ronnie Thomas
9. #3 - Richard Childress
10. #40 - Stan Barrett

=== Los Angeles Times 500 ===
The Los Angeles Times 500 was held on November 15 at Ontario Motor Speedway. Cale Yarborough won his 14th pole of the season, the most in NASCAR's modern era. Earnhardt lost a lap but made it up and despite taking off from a late green-flag stop with unsecured lug nuts on his tires finished fifth with Yarborough third and Benny Parsons the race winner. The race was switched from Sunday to Saturday to accommodate live CBS Sports coverage. Earnhardt's 5th-place finish allowed him to win the championship by 19 points over Yarborough. Following the race Waltrip succeeded in buying out his contract with DiGard Racing while Yarborough announced he would not run the full season in 1981, taking over the M. C. Anderson #27 team driven by race winner Parsons; Waltrip was then hired by Junior Johnson.

Top ten results

1. #27 - Benny Parsons
2. #21 - Neil Bonnett
3. #11 - Cale Yarborough
4. #15 - Bobby Allison
5. #2 - Dale Earnhardt
6. #7 - Lake Speed
7. #75 - Joe Millikan
8. #44 - Terry Labonte
9. #77 - John Anderson
10. #67 - Buddy Arrington

== Full Drivers' Championship ==
(key) Bold – Pole position awarded by time. Italics – Pole position set by owner's points. * – Most laps led.

| Pos. | Driver | RIV | DAY | RCH | CAR | ATL | BRI | DAR | NWS | MAR | TAL | NSV | DOV | CLT | TWS | RIV | MCH | DAY | NSV | POC | TAL | MCH | BRI | DAR | RCH | DOV | NWS | MAR | CLT | CAR | ATL | ONT | Pts |
|---|---|---|---|---|---|---|---|---|---|---|---|---|---|---|---|---|---|---|---|---|---|---|---|---|---|---|---|---|---|---|---|---|---|
| 1 | Dale Earnhardt | 2 | 4 | 5 | 3 | 1 | 1* | 29 | 6 | 13 | 2 | 6 | 10 | 20 | 9 | 5 | 12 | 3 | 1 | 4 | 3 | 35 | 2 | 7 | 4 | 34 | 5 | 1* | 1* | 18 | 3 | 5 | 4661 |
| 2 | Cale Yarborough | 23 | 19 | 25 | 1* | 8* | **5** | 12 | 4 | 4 | 6 | **3*** | **16*** | **17** | **1*** | **4** | 2 | **40** | **2*** | **3** | 2 | 1 | **1*** | 29 | **26** | **4** | **10** | 3 | 2 | 1* | 1* | **3** | 4642 |
| 3 | Benny Parsons | 33 | 5 | 28 | 21 | 30 | 4 | **2** | 5 | 2 | 8 | 2 | 22 | 1 | 23 | 3 | **1*** | 6 | 3 | 20 | 4 | 8 | 5 | 4 | 10 | 5 | 6 | 4 | 33 | 23 | 32 | 1 | 4278 |
| 4 | Richard Petty | 3 | 25 | 3 | 2 | 33 | 8 | 9 | 1* | 3 | 31 | 1 | 2 | 4 | 2 | 8 | 5 | 5 | 5 | 33 | 18 | 5 | 4 | 9 | 2 | 17 | 18 | 15 | 27 | 14 | 21 | 30 | 4255 |
| 5 | Darrell Waltrip | **1*** | 40 | **1*** | **4** | 28 | 2 | 4 | 12 | **1*** | 42 | 4 | 20 | 2* | 4 | 1* | 26 | 31 | 4 | 26 | 11 | 4* | 3 | **25*** | 6 | 1* | 2 | 21 | 18 | 3 | 26 | 25* | 4239 |
| 6 | Bobby Allison | 18 | 2 | 2 | 7 | 3 | 3 | 30 | **3** | 25 | 40 | 5 | 1 | 26 | 3 | 15* | 8 | 1* | 6 | 34 | 35 | 7 | 6 | 6 | 1* | 30 | 1* | 22 | 29 | 26 | **38** | 4 | 4019 |
| 7 | Jody Ridley **(R)** | 16 | 10 | 18 | 29 | 6 | 11 | 10 | 7 | 7 | 10 | 8 | 6 | 12 | 26 | 11 | 6 | 7 | 8 | 18 | 30 | 18 | 12 | 30 | 5 | 9 | 9 | 9 | 8 | 5 | 6 | 18 | 3972 |
| 8 | Terry Labonte | 7 | 6 | 24 | 10 | 15 | 10 | 32 | 22 | 23 | 32 | 7 | 5 | 3 | 5 | 33 | 11 | 32 | 22 | 6 | 31 | 11 | 23 | 1 | 8 | 28 | 7 | 7 | 31 | 4 | 5 | 8 | 3766 |
| 9 | Dave Marcis | 17 | 22 | 4 | 9 | 4 | 9 | 23 | 21 | 8 | 29 | 11 | 25 | 29 | 7 | 6 | 35 | 33 | 14 | 8 | 39 | 26 | 7 | 8 | 7 | 12 | 3 | 5 | 19 | 6 | 22 | 15 | 3745 |
| 10 | Richard Childress | 6 | 13 | 22 | 14 | 13 | 29 | 21 | 11 | 11 | 12 | 29 | 8 | 11 | 6 | 18 | 14 | 8 | 9 | 9 | 6 | 27 | 9 | 12 | 11 | 37 | 19 | 25 | 11 | 7 | 9 | 21 | 3742 |
| 11 | Harry Gant | 12 | 42 | 12 | 8 | 16 | 7 | 3 | 2 | 21 | 37 | 9 | 4 | 28 | 8 | 7 | 28 | 16 | 29 | 5 | 5 | 37 | 14 | 3 | 20 | 2 | 4 | 29 | 16 | 2 | 36 | 41 | 3703 |
| 12 | Buddy Arrington | 14 | 41 | 6 | 25 | 19 | 21 | 14 | 13 | 10 | 18 | 27 | 26 | 10 | 28 | 14 | 23 | 10 | 10 | 13 | 38 | 13 | 20 | 17 | 12 | 13 | 26 | 8 | 13 | 12 | 11 | 10 | 3461 |
| 13 | James Hylton | 11 | 26 | 7 | 13 | 39 | 14 | 18 | 17 | 18 | 13 | 13 | 19 | 23 | 10 | 12 | 24 | 24 | 17 | 15 | 14 | 25 | 17 | 21 | 17 | 19 | 15 | 10 | 21 | 9 | 14 | 24 | 3449 |
| 14 | Ronnie Thomas | 10 | 29 | 26 | 11 | 22 | 12 | 26 | 23 | 22 | 20 | 21 | 11 | 22 | 11 | 16 | 30 | 17 | 26 | 23 | 21 | 29 | 29 | 22 | 22 | 10 | 25 | 18 | | 10 | 8 | 38 | 3066 |
| 15 | Cecil Gordon | | 21 | 8 | 33 | 24 | 22 | 34 | | 17 | 23 | 19 | 9 | 37 | 14 | 10 | 20 | 29 | 21 | 16 | 23 | 21 | 19 | 19 | 18 | 15 | 14 | 13 | 24 | 15 | 25 | 17 | 2993 |
| 16 | J. D. McDuffie | 15 | 27 | 9 | 32 | 9 | 13 | 22 | 30 | 30 | 41 | 20 | 33 | 30 | 29 | 9 | 15 | 23 | 11 | 36 | 25 | 20 | 11 | 18 | 29 | 38 | 24 | 26 | 20 | 21 | 17 | 14 | 2968 |
| 17 | Jimmy Means | 21 | 15 | 30 | 20 | 12 | 24 | 28 | 14 | 12 | | 12 | 27 | 14 | 19 | | 22 | 26 | 16 | 14 | 15 | 14 | 22 | 16 | 13 | 27 | 12 | 30 | | 13 | 20 | 31 | 2947 |
| 18 | Tommy Gale | | 20 | 21 | 26 | 18 | 17 | 15 | 29 | 29 | 16 | 15 | 12 | 33 | 25 | | 19 | 28 | 18 | 19 | 29 | 22 | 13 | 31 | 19 | 36 | 20 | 11 | 22 | 20 | 15 | 16 | 2885 |
| 19 | Neil Bonnett | 34 | 3 | | 6 | 41 | | 36 | | 6 | 27 | | 18 | 5 | | 2 | 4 | 34 | | 1* | 1 | 2 | | 5 | | 6 | | 19 | 30 | 25 | 2 | 2 | 2865 |
| 20 | Roger Hamby | | QL | 16 | 18 | 34 | 18 | 16 | 25 | | 17 | 23 | 13 | | 22 | 23 | 21 | 27 | 15 | 24 | 22 | 30 | 16 | 35 | 16 | 20 | 22 | 14 | 28 | 17 | 12 | | 2606 |
| 21 | Buddy Baker | | **1*** | | 15 | **7** | | 35 | | 24 | 1* | | 3 | 39 | | | 3 | 4 | | 2 | **32*** | **6** | | 26 | | 3 | | **2** | **3** | 27 | 4 | | 2603 |
| 22 | Lake Speed **(R)** | 29 | DNQ | | | 11 | | 8 | | | 7 | | | DNQ | 12 | 26 | 17 | 38 | | 30 | 8 | 16 | | 27 | | 11 | 21 | 20 | 7 | 28 | 24 | 6 | 1853 |
| 23 | Slick Johnson **(R)** | | 14 | | 30 | 10 | 26 | 25 | 9 | 9 | | 25 | | 32 | 30 | | | | 13 | 31 | 19 | | | 15 | | | 8 | 24 | 40 | 8 | | DNQ | 1851 |
| 24 | John Anderson | | 18 | | 24 | | | 17 | 28 | | 26 | 24 | | 18 | | | 13 | 9 | 12 | | | 36 | 15 | 36 | | 32 | 27 | 16 | 35 | 32 | 33 | 9 | 1805 |
| 25 | Bobby Wawak | | | 10 | 17 | | 31 | 13 | 16 | 31 | 30 | 18 | 29 | 25 | 24 | 22 | 29 | | 23 | | 24 | 33 | | 39 | 27 | | 11 | | | | | | 1742 |
| 26 | Donnie Allison | | 7 | | 5 | 26 | | | | | 25 | | | 31 | | 30 | 36 | 19 | 27 | | 26 | 3 | | 32 | | 7 | | 6 | 5 | **22** | 37 | 39 | 1730 |
| 27 | Dick Brooks | 22 | 36 | 29 | 16 | 5 | 27 | 5 | 27 | 26 | 9 | 30 | 17 | 15 | 27 | 31 | 33 | | | | | | | 10 | | | | | 10 | 31 | | | 1698 |
| 28 | Kyle Petty **(R)** | | DNQ | | 31 | 14 | | | 8 | 15 | | | 21 | 7 | | | 7 | | | 7 | 9 | 12 | | | | 23 | | 27 | 9 | 35 | | 33 | 1690 |
| 29 | Baxter Price | | DNQ | 31 | 27 | 21 | 23 | 31 | 19 | 19 | | 22 | 14 | 21 | 18 | | 27 | | 19 | 22 | 27 | 32 | 18 | | 24 | | | | | | | | 1689 |
| 30 | Lennie Pond | | 9 | | | 23 | | 6 | | | 4 | | | 41 | | | | 11 | | | 28 | | 8 | 40 | 3 | 8 | 28 | 28 | 34 | 29 | 7 | 29 | 1558 |
| 31 | Junior Miller | | | | 38 | | 25 | | | 14 | | 16 | 31 | | | | 34 | | 20 | 21 | | | 27 | | 23 | 29 | 13 | 17 | 26 | 33 | 35 | | 1402 |
| 32 | Dick May | 32 | DNQ | 20 | 19 | | 16 | 24 | 15 | 20 | 15 | 17 | 7 | | 16 | | | | 30 | 29 | 10 | 19 | 26 | 28 | | 24 | 29 | | 17 | 16 | | | 1323 |
| 33 | Joe Millikan | 4 | 34 | 27 | 28 | 37 | 6 | 7 | 10 | 5 | | | | | | | | | | | | | | | | | | | | 24 | 23 | 7 | 1274 |
| 34 | Bill Elliott | | 12 | | | 29 | | | | | 21 | | | 42 | | | 9 | 12 | | | 7 | 9 | | 33 | | | | | 6 | | 18 | | 1232 |
| 35 | Ricky Rudd | | | | 12 | 31 | | 19 | | | | | | 9 | | | 32 | 13 | 28 | 10 | 20 | 34 | 28 | 34 | | | | | 4 | | | | 1213 |
| 36 | Bill Elswick | | 24 | 15 | 23 | | 19 | 20 | 24 | 27 | 35 | | 30 | 34 | | | | | | | | | | | 14 | | | | | 36 | | | 1053 |
| 37 | David Pearson | | | | | | | 1* | | | **3** | | | 6 | | | 25 | 2 | | | 17 | | | 2 | | | | | 38 | | 31 | | 1004 |
| 38 | D. K. Ulrich | | | | | | | | 26 | 28 | | | 34 | | 15 | 36 | | | | | | 15 | 10 | 13 | 25 | | 30 | | | | | 37 | 935 |
| 39 | Tighe Scott | | 39 | | 37 | 32 | | | | | 5 | | 23 | 36 | | | 10 | 36 | | 32 | 34 | | | | | | | | | | | | 791 |
| 40 | Frank Warren | | QL | | | 20 | | | | | 19 | | | | 17 | | | | | | 33 | 31 | | 23 | | 25 | | | | | | | 559 |
| 41 | Tim Richmond | | | | | | | | | | | | | | | | | | | 12 | | | | | | 31 | | 12 | 12 | | 29 | | 527 |
| 42 | Bill Schmitt | 5 | 23 | | | | | | | | | | | | | 13 | | | | | | | | | | | | | | | | 11 | 503 |
| 43 | Buck Simmons | | DNQ | | 22 | 40 | 32 | 27 | | 16 | 24 | | | | | | | | | | | | | | | | | | | | | | 495 |
| 44 | Rick Newsom | | DNQ | 19 | | 36 | | | 20 | 32 | | 26 | 32 | | | | | | | | | | | | | | | | | | | | 483 |
| 45 | Dave Dion | | | | | | | | | | | | | | | | | | | 17 | | | | | 9 | 14 | | 31 | | | | | 441 |
| 46 | Don Whittington | 9 | 16 | | | 38 | | | | | 34 | | | | | 35 | | 22 | | | | | | 38 | | | | | | | | | 429 |
| 47 | Steve Moore | | | | | | | | | | 14 | | | 35 | | | | 18 | | | QL | | | | | | | | | | 13 | | 412 |
| 48 | Tommy Houston | | | 17 | | | 15 | | 31 | | | | | 24 | | | | | | | | | | | | | | | | | | | 396 |
| 49 | Sterling Marlin | | 8 | | | | | 11 | | | | | | 16 | | | | | 7 | | | | | | | | | | 36 | | | | 387 |
| 50 | Bruce Hill | | 33 | | | 27 | | | | | 36 | | | 38 | | | | 35 | | | 41 | | | | | | | | | | | | 348 |
| 51 | Chuck Bown | 36 | 35 | | | | | | | | | | | | | | 31 | 37 | | 35 | | | | 11 | | | | | 25 | | | 27 | 329 |
| 52 | Jim Vandiver | | 37 | | | | | | | | 39 | | | 8 | | | | 25 | | | | | | | | | | | | | | | 328 |
| 53 | Jeff McDuffie | | | | | | | | 18 | | | | | | | | | | | | | | | | | | 17 | | | 19 | | | 327 |
| 54 | Coo Coo Marlin | | QL | | | | | | | | 11 | | | | | | | 14 | | | 37 | | | | | | | | | | | | 303 |
| 55 | Don Sprouse | | | | | | | | | | | 14 | | | | | | | 24 | | | | | | 15 | | | 23 | | | | | 303 |
| 56 | Joe Booher | | 17 | 11 | | 35 | | | | | | | | | | 19 | | | | | | | | | | 16 | | | | | | 34 | 294 |
| 57 | Rusty Wallace | | | | | 2 | | | | | | | | | | | | | | | | | | | | | | | 14 | | | | 291 |
| 58 | Jim Robinson | 24 | | | | | | | | | | | | | | 20 | | | | | | | | | | | | | | | | 28 | 273 |
| 59 | Hershel McGriff | 26 | | | | | | | | | | | | | | 24 | | | | | | | | | | | | | | | | 23 | 270 |
| 60 | Roy Smith | 13 | | | | | | | | | | | | | | 28 | | | | | | | | | | | | | | | | 36 | 263 |
| 61 | Don Puskarich | 19 | | | | | | | | | | | | | | 17 | | | | | | | | | | | | | | | | 42 | 255 |
| 62 | Kenny Hemphill | | | | | | | | | | | | | | | | | | | 25 | | 10 | | 41 | | 33 | | | 15 | | | | 252 |
| 63 | Blackie Wangerin | | DNQ | | | | | | | | | | | 13 | | | | | | | | | | 37 | | | | | | | 34 | | 237 |
| 64 | Mike Potter | | | | 36 | | 30 | | | | | | | | | | 18 | | | | | | | | | | | | | | | | 237 |
| 65 | Travis Tiller | | | | | | 28 | | | | | | | | | | | | | 40 | | | | | | 26 | | | | | 30 | | 237 |
| 66 | Rick McCray | 35 | | | | | | | | | | | | | | 32 | | | | | | | | | | | | | | | | 19 | 231 |
| 67 | Connie Saylor | | | | | | | | | | | | | 19 | | | | 39 | | | | | | 14 | | | | | 23 | | 27 | | 227 |
| 68 | Rick Wilson | | | | | | | | | | | | | | | | | 15 | | | 36 | | | | | | | | 37 | | | | 225 |
| 69 | Janet Guthrie | | 11 | | | | | | | | | | | | | | | | | 28 | | | | | | | | | | | | | 209 |
| 70 | Wayne Watercutter | | DNQ | | | | | | | | | | | | | | 16 | | | | | 24 | | | | | | | | | | | 206 |
| 71 | Marty Robbins | | | | | | | | | | 33 | | | | | | | 30 | | | 13 | | | | | | | | 32 | | | | 204 |
| 72 | Randy Ogden | 30 | Wth | | 34 | | | | | | | | | | 31 | | | | | | | | | | | | | | | | | | 204 |
| 73 | Eddie Dickerson | | | | | | | | | | | | | | | | | | | | | | | | 21 | 22 | | | | | | | 197 |
| 74 | Don Waterman | | | | | | | | | | | | | | | 25 | | | | | | | | | | | | | | | | 20 | 191 |
| 75 | Kevin Housby | | 30 | | | 17 | | | | | DNQ | | | | | | | | | | | | | | | | | | | | | 26 | 185 |
| 76 | John Utsman | | 28 | | | | 20 | | | | | | | | | | | | | | | | | | | | | | | | | | 182 |
| 77 | Steve Pfeifer | 27 | | | | | | | | | | | | | | 21 | | | | | | | | | | | | | | | | | 182 |
| 78 | Phil Finney | | DNQ | | | | | | | | 38 | | | | | | | 20 | | | | | | | | | | | | | | | 152 |
| 79 | Nelson Oswald | | | | | | | | | | DNQ | | | | 20 | | | | | 38 | | | | | | | | | | | | | 152 |
| 80 | Jocko Maggiacomo | | DNQ | | | | | | | | | | 24 | | | | | | | 39 | | | | | | | | | | | | | 137 |
| 81 | John Borneman | 31 | | | | | | | | | | | | | | 34 | | | | | | | | | | | | | | | | | 131 |
| 82 | Harry Dinwiddie | | | | | | | | | | | | | | | | | | | | 12 | | | | | | | | | | | | 127 |
| 83 | Mike Miller | | | | | | | | | | | | | | | | | | | | | | | | | | | | 39 | | 28 | | 125 |
| 84 | Joey Arrington | | | 13 | | | | | | | | | | | | | | | | | | | | | | | | | | | | | 124 |
| 85 | Jimmy Finger | | | | | | | | | | | | | | 13 | | | | | | | | | | | | | | | | | | 124 |
| 86 | Jimmy Ingram | | | | | | | | | | | | 15 | | | | | | | | | | | DNQ | | | | | | DNQ | | | 118 |
| 87 | Billie Harvey | | | | | | | | | | | | | 27 | | | | | | 11 | 16 | 17 | | | | | | | | | | DNQ | 115 |
| 88 | Bill Osborne | 37 | | | 35 | | | | | | | | | | | | | | | | | | | | | | | | | | | | 110 |
| 89 | Joel Stowe | | | | | | | | | | | | | | | | | | | | | | | | | 18 | 16 | | | | | | 109 |
| 90 | Vince Giamformaggio | 20 | | | | | | | | | | | | | | | | | | | | | | | | | | | | | | | 103 |
| 91 | John Callis | | | | | | | | | | | | | | | | | | | | | | | | | 21 | | | | | 40 | DNQ | 100 |
| 92 | Bill Hollar | | | 23 | | | | | | | | | | | | | | | | | | | | | | | | | | | | | 94 |
| 93 | Bruce Jacobi | | | | | | | | | | | | | | | | | | | | | 23 | | | | | | | | | | | 94 |
| 94 | Ralph Jones | | DNQ | | | 25 | | | | | | | | | | | | | | | | | | 24 | | | | | | | | | 88 |
| 95 | Jim Hopkinson | | | | | | | | | | | | | | | 27 | | | | | | | | | | | | | | | | | 82 |
| 96 | Stuart Huffman | | | | | | | | | | | | | | | | | | | | | 28 | 24 | | | | | | | | | | 79 |
| 97 | Nestor Peles | | | | | | | | | | | | 28 | | | | | | | | | | | | | | | | | | | | 79 |
| 98 | Dick Skillen | | | | | | | | | | 28 | | | | | | | | | | | | | | | | | | | | | | 79 |
| 99 | Ed Hale | | | | | | | | | | | | | | | 29 | | | | | | | | | | | | | | | | | 76 |
| 100 | Bobby Sands | | | | | | | | | | | | | | | | | | | | | | 30 | | | | | | | | | | 73 |
| 101 | A. J. Foyt | | 31 | | | | | | | | | | | | | | | | | | | | | | | | | | | | | | 70 |
| 102 | Bill Whittington | 8 | 32 | | | | | | | | | | | | | | | | | | | | | | | | | | | | | | 67 |
| 103 | Glenn Francis | | | | | | | | | | | | | | | | | | | | | | | | | | | | | | | 32 | 67 |
| 104 | Melvin Revis | | | | | | | 33 | | | | | | | | | | | | | | | | | | | | | | | | | 64 |
| 105 | Glen Ward | | | | | | | | | | | | | | | | | | | | | | | | | | | | | | | 35 | 58 |
| 106 | Henry Jones | | | | | | | | | | | | | | 21 | | 37 | | | 37 | | | | | | | | | | | | 22 | 52 |
| 107 | Jim Hurlbert | | 38 | | | | | | | | | | | | | | | | | | | | | | | | | | | | | | 49 |
| 108 | Gary Balough | | | | | | | | | | | | | | | | | | | | | | | | | | | | | | 39 | DNQ | 46 |
| 109 | Jim Sauter | | | | | | | | | | | | | | | | | | | | | | | | | | | | 41 | | | | 40 |
| 110 | Bub Strickler | | DNQ | 14 | | | | | | | | | | | | | | | | | | | 21 | | 28 | 35 | 23 | | | | | | |
| 111 | Stan Barrett | | | | | | | | | | | | | | | | | | | | | | | | | | | | | 11 | 10 | 13 | |
| 112 | Steve Spencer | | | | | | | | | | | 28 | | | | | | | 25 | | | | 25 | | | | | | | | | | |
| 113 | Glenn Jarrett | | | | | | | | | | | | | | | | | | | | | | | | | | | | | 34 | | 12 | |
| 114 | Ferrel Harris | | | | | | | | | | | | | | | | | | | | 40 | | | 20 | | | | | | | | | |
| 115 | John Greenwood | | | | | | | | | | | | | 40 | | | | 21 | | | | | | | | | | | | | | | |
| 116 | Bob Riley | | DNQ | | | | | | | | | | | | | | | | | 27 | | | | | | 39 | | | | | | | |
| 117 | Mike Alexander | | | | | | | | | | | 10 | | | | | | | | | | | | | | | | | | | | | |
| 118 | Charlie Chamblee | | | | | | | | | | | | | | | | | | | | | | | | | | | | | | 16 | | |
| 119 | Clay Young | | | | | | | | | | | | | | | | | | | | | | | | | | | | | | 19 | | |
| 120 | Gary Baker | | DNQ | | | | | | | | 22 | | | | | | | | | | | | | | | | | | | | | | |
| 121 | Chuck Wahl | 25 | | | | | | | | | | | | | | | | | | | | | | | | | | | | | | | |
| 122 | Dan Gurney | 28 | | | | | | | | | | | | | | | | | | | | | | | | | | | | | | | |
| 123 | Ernie Cline | | | | | | | | | | | | | | | | | | | | | | | | | | | | | 30 | | | |
| 124 | Steve Gray | | | | | | | | | | | | | | | | | | | | | | | | | 40 | | | | | | | |
| 125 | Joe Ruttman | | | | | | | | | | | | | | | | | | | | | | | | | | | | | | | 40 | |
| 126 | Gary Matthews | DNQ | | | | | | | | | | | | | | | | | | | | | | | | | | | | | | | |
| 127 | Dick Whalen | DNQ | | | | | | | | | | | | | | | | | | | | | | | | | | | | | | | |
| 128 | Gene Thoneson | DNQ | | | | | | | | | | | | | | DNQ | | | | | | | | | | | | | | | | | |
| 129 | St. James Davis | DNQ | | | | | | | | | | | | | | | | | | | | | | | | | | | | | | DNQ | |
| 130 | Jim Hurtubise | | DNQ | | | | | | | | | | | | | | | | | | | | | | | | | | | | | | |
| 131 | Ricky Knotts | | DNQ | | | | | | | | | | | | | | | | | | | | | | | | | | | | | | |
| 132 | Steve Peles | | DNQ | | | | | | | | | | | | | | | | | | | | | | | | | | | | | | |
| 133 | Ricky Otts | | DNQ | | | | | | | | | | | | | | | | | | | | | | | | | | | | | | |
| 134 | Bill Green | | | | | | | | | | | | | | | | | | | | | | | | | | | | | | | | |
| 135 | Bob Switzer | | DNQ | | | | | | | | | | | | | | | | | | | | | | | | | | | | | | |
| 136 | Terry Ryan | | DNQ | | | | | | | | | | | | | | | | | | | | | | | | | | | | | | |
| 137 | Jerry Hansen | | DNQ | | | | | | | | | | | | | | | | | | | | | | | | | | | | | | |
| 138 | Frank Freda | | DNQ | | | | | | | | | | | | | | | | | | | | | | | | | | | | | DNQ | |
| 139 | Dick Kranzler | | | | | | | | | | | | | | | | | | | | | | | | | | | | | | | DNQ | |
| 140 | Harry Goularte | | | | | | | | | | | | | | | | | | | | | | | | | | | | | | | DNQ | |
| 141 | Don Stanley | | | | | | | | | | | | | | | | | | | | | | | | | | | | | | | DNQ | |
| 142 | Ron O'Dell | | | | | | | | | | | | | | | | | | | | | | | | | | | | | | | DNQ | |
| 143 | Tim McMillan | | | | | | | | | | | | | | | | | | | | | | | | | | | | | | | DNQ | |
| 144 | Tim Williamson | Wth | | | | | | | | | | | | | | | | | | | | | | | | | | | | | | | |
| 145 | Bill Dennis | | QL | | | | | | | | | | | | | | | | | | | | | | | | | | | | | | |
| Pos. | Driver | RIV | DAY | RCH | CAR | ATL | BRI | DAR | NWS | MAR | TAL | NSV | DOV | CLT | TWS | RIV | MCH | DAY | NSV | POC | TAL | MCH | BRI | DAR | RCH | DOV | MAR | NWS | CLT | CAR | ATL | ONT | Pts |

== See also ==
- 1980 NASCAR Winston West Series
