= Buddy Parrott =

NASCAR crew chief

Personal information
- Nationality: American
- Born: November 24, 1939 (age 86) Gastonia, North Carolina, U.S.
- Occupation: Crew chief

Sport
- Sport: NASCAR Sprint Cup Series

James Kenneth "Buddy" Parrott is an American NASCAR crew chief. Over 18 years, Parrott won 49 races. Parrott's sons Todd and Brad also served as crew chiefs.

== Career ==
Parrott's career began in 1968 when he became a tire changer for Huggins Tire, a Goodyear distributor. In 1970, Parrott worked under Harry Hyde for Bobby Isaac; that year Isaac won the Grand National championship. Parrott worked for Hyde's No. 71 team through 1974, then in 1975 he became the crew chief for Ferrel Harris.

In 1977 he was hired by DiGard Motorsports. He worked under David Ifft as crew chief for Darrell Waltrip. In May 1977, following victory at the Winston 500, Ifft left the team and Parrott was promoted to full-time crew chief. The combination became one of the strongest in Winston Cup racing as Waltrip and Parrott won ten races in the 1977–1978 seasons. In 1979, Waltrip finished a close second in points. After winning four races in the first half of 1980, Parrott was fired from the DiGard team; he finished the season with the Harry Ranier team and driver Buddy Baker.

Parrott was hired by Charlotte medical doctor Ron Benfield as crew chief for a team he had formed for 1981. For three seasons Parrott was crew chief of Benfield's No. 98 racecars driven by Johnny Rutherford, Morgan Shepherd, Rusty Wallace and Joe Ruttman. In 1984, Parrott was hired by Mike Curb to be Richard Petty's crew chief. Parrott and Petty won at Dover, and was chief for Petty's 200th career victory in the 1984 Firecracker 400 at Daytona International Speedway. In 1987 & 1988, Parrott joined Jocko's Racing and became a part-time crew chief for the No. 63 team. Maggiacomo was involved in Bobby Allison's career-ending accident and parted ways with the team shortly after. In 1990 later, Parrott joined Derrike Cope of Bob Whitcomb Racing's team, and helped him win the 1990 Daytona 500.

In 1992, Parrott was reunited with Wallace at Penske Racing, winning 19 races together. Three years later, he joined Diamond Ridge Motorsports to work with Steve Grissom. However, Parrott left the team citing business disagreements with owner Gary Bechtel. In 1997, he joined Jeff Burton's crew, and helped him win the inaugural race at Texas Motor Speedway. Later that season, Parrott was fined $20,000 by NASCAR for improperly mounted roof flaps prior to the Winston 500 at Talladega. In 1998, he became the team manager for Mark Martin's Roush Racing team. At California Speedway that year, Parrott tripped over cords in the pit box, fracturing his ribs, but still celebrated Martin's victory in the 1998 California 500. He remained with the team until his retirement in 2001 after 34 years of service.

In 2004, Parrott was inducted into the North Carolina Auto Racing Hall of Fame.
