= Joey Arrington =

American racing driver (born 1956)

- Born: July 25, 1956 (age 70); Rocky Mount, Virginia, U.S.

NASCAR Cup Series career
- 9 races run over 5 years
- Best finish: 84th (1980)
- First race: 1974 Capital City 500 (Richmond)
- Last race: 1980 Richmond 400 (Richmond)
Wins	Top tens	Poles
0	0	0

Joey Arrington (born July 25, 1956) is an American former NASCAR driver, team owner, and crew chief from Rocky Mount, Virginia. He made nine Winston Cup Series starts with a best finish of twelfth. He made his first start in 1974 as a seventeen-year-old and raced until 1980.

Arrington was the owner of Race Engines Plus LLC and is the son of former NASCAR driver Buddy Arrington. Arrington was a partner in Bobby Hamilton Racing. He started Arrington Manufacturing and Arrington Engines in 2000. After selling his interests in both entities, he moved the majority of his business ventures to Concord, North Carolina, before founding anew NASCAR Camping World Truck Series team in 2012.

== Biography ==
Arrington is the son of Buddy and Jeanette Arrington, and often was present at his father's races. His interests in engines and car tuning were sparked by Petty Enterprises engine builder Maurice Petty, and Joey would tweak his skills in the Petty shop in Level Cross. After graduating high school in 1975, the younger Arrington became the crew chief and engine builder for his father's racing efforts.

Arrington was an integral part of Dodge's return to stock car racing, building engines and providing parts for Dodge teams for their return to ARCA in 1991, Trans-Am, and the Craftsman Truck Series in 1995.

== Arrington Manufacturing / Race Engines Plus ==
Arrington Performance Race Engines Plus ShopHemi
- Industry: Automotive
- Founded: 2000
- Founder: Joey Arrington
- Defunct: 2023
- Successor: Speed Engines
- Headquarters: Martinsville, Virginia; Concord, North Carolina
- Area served: United States worldwide
- Key people: Joey Arrington; Buddy Arrington
- Brands: Toyota, GM, Dodge, Ford
- Services: Engine building and parts
- Website: Race Engines Plus; ShopHemi.com

In 2000, Arrington founded Arrington Manufacturing, Inc. in Martinsville, Virginia, also operating as Arrington Engines. Arrington built engines for Dodge truck teams Bobby Hamilton Racing and Ultra Motorsports, winning championships in 2004 and 2005 with Ted Musgrave and Bobby Hamilton.

In 2009, with Dodge pulling support from the Truck Series, Arrington shifted its focus and expanded into the aftermarket parts industry. That same year, they began providing engines to rookie Cup team Tommy Baldwin Racing, a team he had worked with in the NASCAR Nationwide Series.

In 2011, Arrington began his new entity, called Race Engines Plus and located in the auto racing hub of Concord, North Carolina. Headquartered on Weddington Road, the company built race engines for teams in NASCAR, NHRA, and SCCA, and also provided engine building contract services for businesses and individuals. REP and the shop were purchased by Robby Gordon in 2023, who rebranded the company to Speed Engines.

Arrington's association with Dodge remains, providing customized HEMI engines for street cars. Buddy Arrington, Joey's father, was a 2015 Mopar Hall of Fame inductee.
