= 1979 Daytona 500 =

Auto race run in Florida in 1979

Race details
- Race 2 of 31 in the 1979 NASCAR Winston Cup Series
- 1979 Daytona 500 program cover
- Date: February 18, 1979
- Location: Daytona International Speedway; Daytona Beach, Florida, U.S.
- Course: Permanent racing facility 2.5 mi (4.023 km)
- Distance: 200 laps, 500 mi (804.672 km)
- Weather: Temperatures of 70 °F (21 °C); wind speeds of 14 miles per hour (23 km/h)
- Average speed: 143.977 miles per hour (231.709 km/h)

Pole position
Driver	Buddy Baker	Ranier-Lundy

Qualifying race winners
Duel 1 Winner	Buddy Baker	Ranier-Lundy
Duel 2 Winner	Darrell Waltrip	DiGard Motorsports

Most laps led
Driver	Donnie Allison	Ellington Racing
- Laps: 93

Winner
No. 43	Richard Petty	Petty Enterprises

Television in the United States
- Network: CBS
- Announcers: Ken Squier and David Hobbs (main booth), Brock Yates and Ned Jarrett (pit road), Marianne Bunch-Phelps (garage area)
- Nielsen ratings: 10.5/29 (15.1 million viewers)

Radio in the United States
- Radio: MRN
- Booth announcers: Barney Hall and Jack Arute
- Turn announcers: Mike Joy (1 & 2) Gary Gerould (Backstretch) Eli Gold (3 & 4)

The 1979 Daytona 500, the 21st annual running of the event, was the second race of the 1979 NASCAR Winston Cup Series season. It was held on February 18, 1979 at Daytona International Speedway, in Daytona Beach, Florida. It has been called the most important race in stock car history.

The race was televised live "flag-to-flag", a rarity in the era, and the first for a 500-mile race in the United States. Camera angles such as the "in-car" view were introduced to viewers from all over the United States.

On the final lap, race leaders Cale Yarborough and Donnie Allison collided with each other on the backstretch. Both drivers' races ended in the grass infield. The wreck allowed Richard Petty, at the time of the crash over one-half lap behind the leaders, to claim his sixth Daytona 500 win.

As Petty made his way to Victory Lane to celebrate, a fight erupted between Yarborough, Donnie Allison and his brother, Bobby, at the site of the backstretch wreck. Both events were caught by television cameras and broadcast live.

The race brought national publicity to NASCAR. Due to a large winter storm, parts of the Midwest and most of the Northeastern United States were snowed in, leaving a very sizable audience to watch the race who were not traditionally part of NASCAR's demographic, which largely drew from Southeastern states. Motorsports announcer and editor Dick Berggren said, "Nobody knew it then, but that was the race that got everything going. It was the first 'water cooler' race, the first time people had stood around water coolers on Monday and talked about seeing a race on TV the day before. It took a while – years, maybe – to realize how important it was."

== Television ==
The 1979 Daytona 500 was the first 500-mile race to be broadcast in its entirety live on national television in the United States. Races were shown on television, but the Indianapolis 500, for example, was broadcast on tape delay later in the evening on the day it was run in this era and usually in edited form. Most races aired during this period were only broadcast starting with the final quarter to half of the race, as was the procedure for ABC's IndyCar broadcasts on their Wide World of Sports program.

CBS signed a new contract with NASCAR to telecast the race. Ken Squier and David Hobbs were the booth announcers with Ned Jarrett and Brock Yates in the pits for that race, while other angles, such as an interview with race grand marshall Ben Gazzara and NASCAR founder Bill France Sr., were handled by Marianne Bunch-Phelps. The day was fortunate for CBS as a major snowstorm known as the Presidents' Day Snowstorm of 1979 bogged down most of the Northeast and parts of the Midwestern United States, increasing the viewership of the event. The race introduced two new innovative uses of TV cameras, the "in-car" camera and the low angle "speed shot", which are now considered standard in all telecasts of auto racing.

The race attracted a TV rating of 10.5 and attracted 16 million viewers. It held the highest television rating for a Daytona 500 until the 2002 Daytona 500.

Motor Racing Network broadcast the race on the radio and their announcers included Jack Arute, Barney Hall, Mike Joy, Gary Gerould (who also hosted prerace ceremonies) and Dick Berggren.

== Qualifying ==
Buddy Baker and Donnie Allison qualified first and second and were the only drivers to do so, as only two cars qualify from time trials. All other drivers had to race their way through qualifying races.

Baker won his first qualifying race, with Cale Yarborough, Benny Parsons, Bobby Allison and David Pearson finishing in the top five, with positions 2-5 starting on the inside of rows 2-5, respectively.

In the second qualifying race, pole-sitter Donnie Allison had an engine failure (no penalty for failed engines in the qualifying race until 2018) midway through the race. Darrell Waltrip won the second qualifying race to start fourth. The rest of the cars starting on the outside of rows 3-5 were A. J. Foyt, Dick Brooks and rookie Dale Earnhardt making his Daytona 500 debut.

Notable drivers who failed to advance from qualifying races or speed included USAC star Jim Hurtubise, French sports car ace Claude Ballot-Léna, Cup race winners James Hylton, Morgan Shepherd, and future NASCAR Hall of Fame driver Bill Elliott.

== Race ==
The first 15 laps of the 200-lap race were run under green and yellow flag conditions to help dry the track from rain the previous night. This impacted Waltrip, as running at relatively slow speeds on the high banks of the track caused a lack of oil to lubricate his camshaft, resulting in a cam lobe wearing away prematurely and causing his engine to run on seven cylinders for the rest of the race.

On the start of lap 16 (the first green flag lap), pole-sitter Baker lost the draft and fell back. Donnie raced with Yarborough and Bobby Allison, but lost control of his car on lap 31 and forced Yarborough and Bobby to take evasive action. All three cars spun through the backstretch infield, which was slippery and muddy from the rain. Yarborough was forced to repair his car and fell two laps behind the leader, as did Bobby, while Donnie lost one lap. The track would remain under caution through lap 41.

While the field was still under caution on lap 38, Baker dropped out of the race with ignition problems. His team had made some minor welding repairs before the race, and it was thought the primary ignition control box had been damaged as the engine was misfiring. During attempts to diagnose and repair the problem, the team switched to the backup box and replaced much of the ignition system to no avail. When the team returned home after the race, engine builder Waddell Wilson determined that the crewman who had switched to the backup box by unplugging the primary ignition box and plugging into the backup box had plugged back into the defective primary box. When Wilson switched to the backup ignition box, the car fired perfectly.

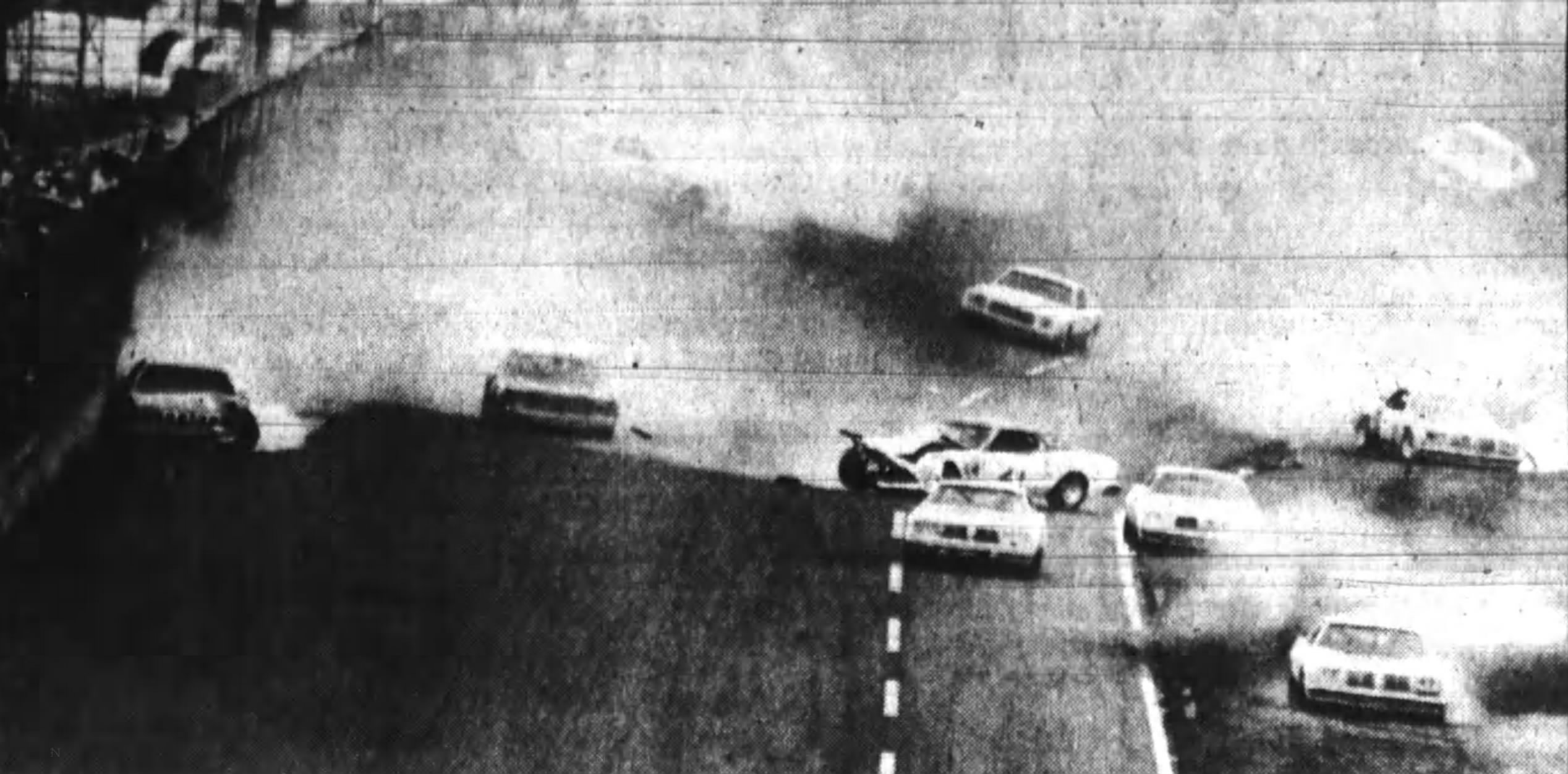
The aftermath of the lap 55 crash

When the caution ended on lap 42, the race became an 18-car battle. Neil Bonnett, driving an Oldsmobile, took the lead and was challenged by Foyt and Waltrip; he fought them off, but was soon challenged by Bobby trying to unlap himself, Earnhardt and dark-horse driver Tighe Scott, driving a Buick Century prepared by Harry Hyde. A six-car crash on lap 55 eliminated Pearson and others. Donnie raced to unlap himself and made his lap up when Bonnett blew a tire and spun in traffic. Other contenders were eliminated, as Bobby felt multiple laps behind, Harry Gant crashed, Earnhardt over-revved his engine leaving the pits and broke a rocker arm and valve spring, Parsons' car overheated, and Scott slid through his pits unable to stop when he hit a puddle of water from Parsons' overheating engine. Past the halfway point, Donnie assumed the lead, but Yarborough used more caution flags to make up his lost laps. Yarborough was on the lead lap with Allison by lap 178.

=== Finish ===
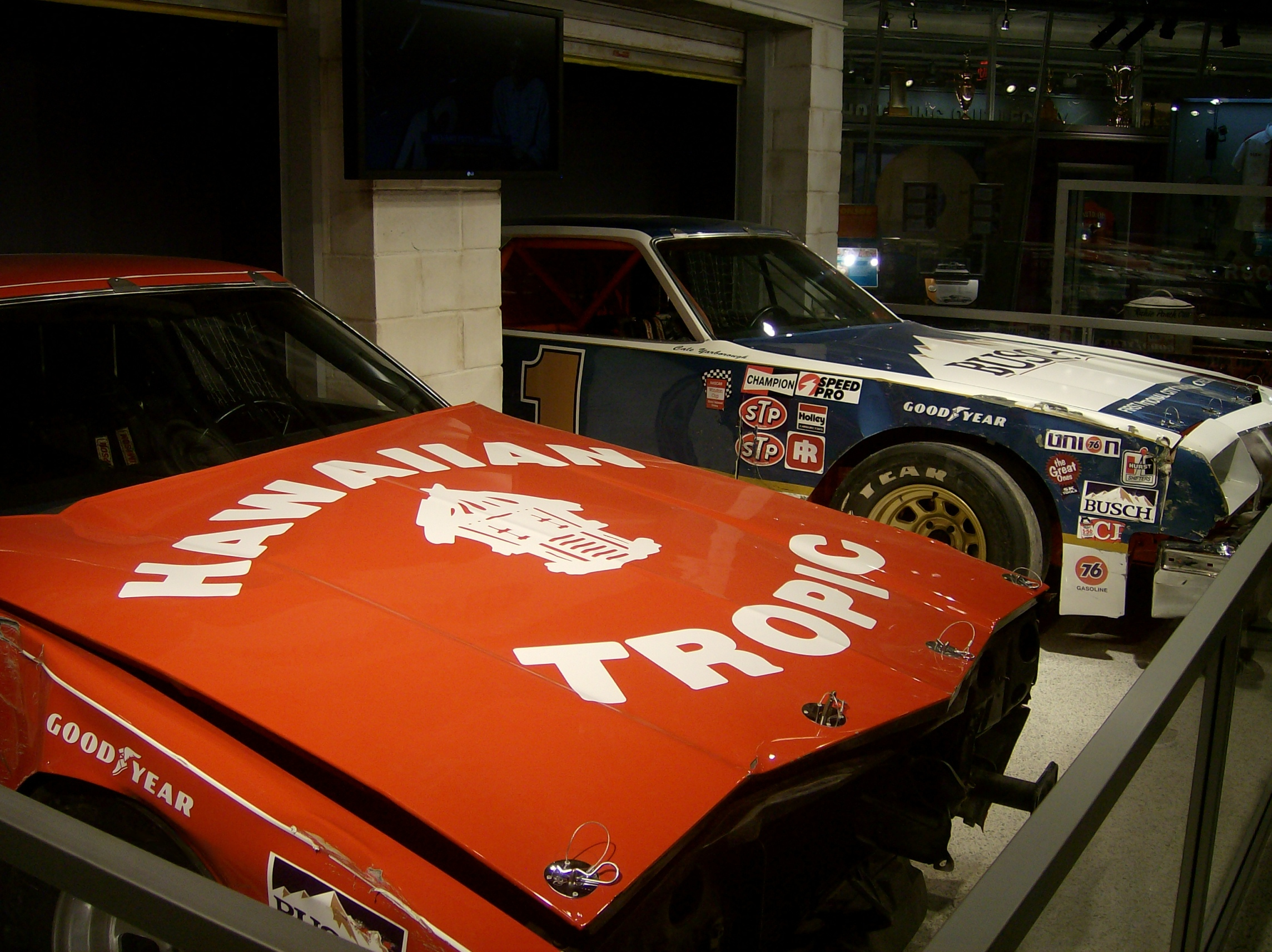
The cars of Cale Yarborough and Donnie Allison from the 1979 Daytona 500 in the NASCAR Hall of Fame.

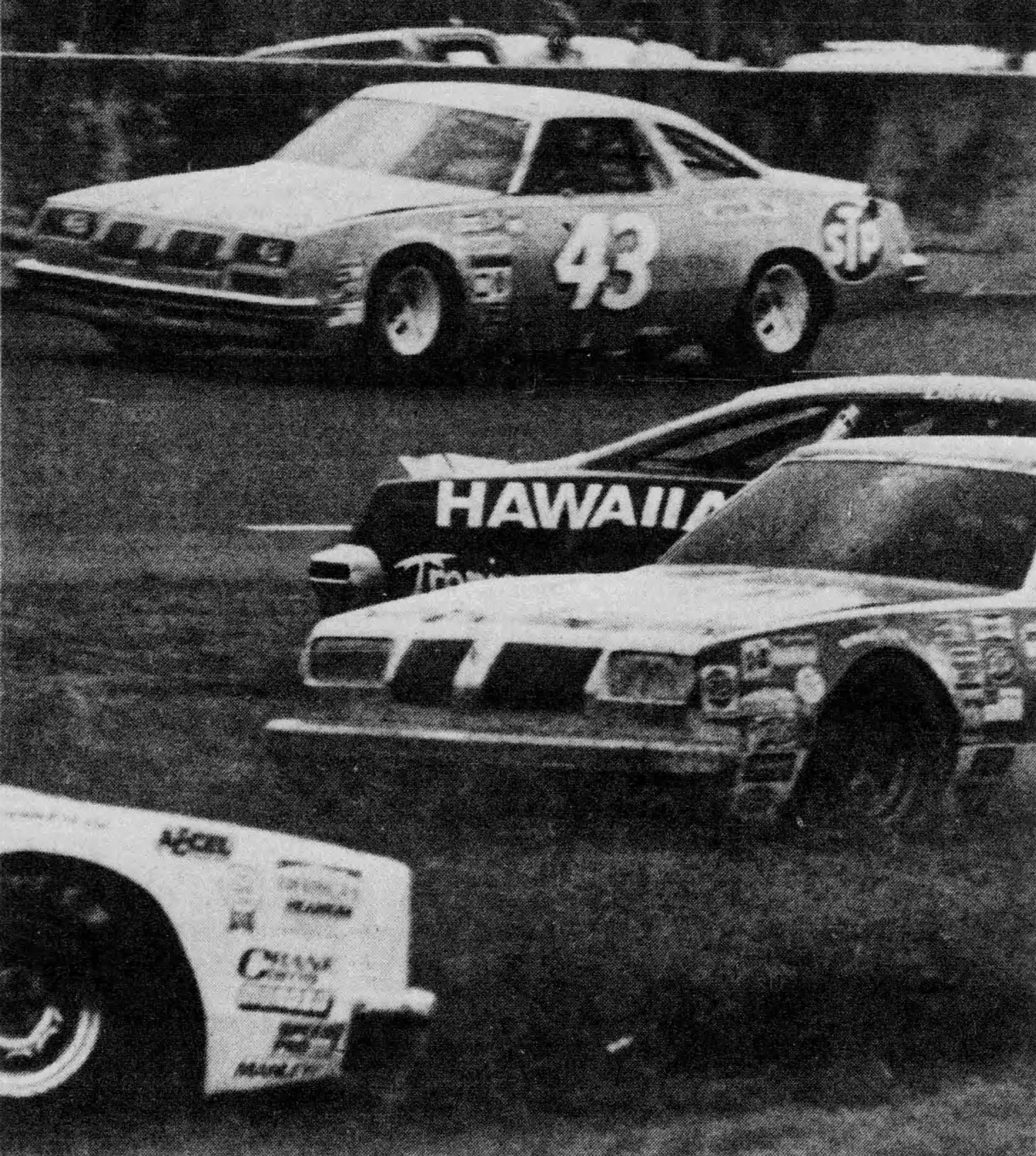
Allison and Yarborough spinning out into the infield as Petty speeds by

Following green flag stops, Donnie took the lead on lap 178 with Yarborough close behind. They pulled away during the final laps and led the next closest competitors by half a lap. Allison took the white flag and was leading the race on the final lap with Yarborough drafting him tightly. As Yarborough attempted a slingshot pass on the backstretch, Allison attempted to block him. Yarborough refused to give ground and as he pulled alongside Donnie, his left side tires left the pavement and went into the wet and muddy infield grass. Yarborough lost control of his car and contacted Donnie's car halfway down the backstretch. As both drivers tried to maintain control, their cars made contact three more times before locking together and crashing into the outside wall in turn three. The cars slid down the banking and came to rest in the infield. Petty, who was over half a lap behind both drivers before the incident, went on to win, beating Waltrip by one car length.

After the wrecked cars of Donnie and Yarborough settled in the infield grass short of the finish line, the two drivers began to argue. Bobby, who was one lap down at that point, stopped where the wreck was, offering Donnie a ride back to the garage. Yarborough blamed Bobby for his defeat due to tensions they had with each other earlier during the race. He struck Bobby in the face with his helmet while Bobby was sitting in his car. Fuming, Bobby jumped out of his car and struck Yarborough in the mouth.

Yarborough knocked Bobby to the ground and struck him in the back with his helmet twice. Donnie Allison grabbed Yarborough from behind, shouting "Hey! You want to fight?! I'm the cat you should be fighting with!" Donnie pulled Yarborough away from Bobby, who jumped up and threw a punch at Yarborough. Bobby grabbed Yarborough by the collar with one arm, shaking him as Yarborough tried to shove him away with his foot and kicking at him. Donnie also held on to Yarborough's arm and swung his helmet trying to defend his brother. A track safety official grabbed Yarborough, trying to pry him away from the Allisons. Yarborough fell to the ground and Bobby jumped on him, hitting him twice in the nose. More track marshals arrived and restrained all three drivers, separating them after the 16-second brawl.

With Allison and Yarborough wrecking near the end of the last lap, the television audience was mostly shown footage of Petty crossing the finish line to win the race. Brief moments of the fight were seen on national television when the commentators and camera operators realized what was going on and switched to the scene.

Yarborough said, "I was going to pass him and win the race, but he turned left and crashed me. So, hell, I crashed him back. If I wasn't going to get back around, he wasn't either." Allison said, "The track was mine until he hit me in the back," he says. "He got me loose and sideways, so I came back to get what was mine. He wrecked me, I didn't wreck him."

In the aftermath, both Allison brothers and Yarborough were fined $6,000 for actions detrimental to stock car racing. Although all three of them were penalized, the Allisons were put on probation for six months as the incident was judged to have been instigated by them. As per the penalty, the Allisons and Yarborough had to post a $5,000 bond which would be returned over the next several races provided good behavior. Bobby and Donnie appealed the penalty, arguing that they weren't the cause of the accident. On appeal, the Allisons' probation periods concluded in three months, and Yarborough was put on probation for three months. The initial judgement that the wreck was Donnie's fault was amended to place blame equally on both him and Yarborough. $5,000 of their $6,000 fines were returned $1,000 at a time over the next five races.

The story made the front page of The New York Times Sports section. NASCAR had arrived as a national sport and began to expand from its southeastern United States base and become a national sport, shedding its moonshine running roots along the way.

== Race results ==
Pos	Grid	No.	Driver	Team	Manufacturer	Laps	Time/Retired	Led	Points
1	13	43	Richard Petty	Petty Enterprises	Oldsmobile	200	3:28:22	12	180
2	4	88	Darrell Waltrip	DiGard Motorsports	Oldsmobile	200	+1 car length	4	175
3	6	51	A. J. Foyt	A. J. Foyt Enterprises	Oldsmobile	200	+3 car lengths	4	–
4	2	1	Donnie Allison	Ellington Racing	Oldsmobile	199	Contact	93	170
5	3	11	Cale Yarborough	Junior Johnson & Associates	Oldsmobile	199	Contact	3	160
6	33	30	Tighe Scott	Ballard Racing	Buick	199	+1 lap	0	150
7	28	68	Chuck Bown	Jim Testa	Buick	199	+1 lap	0	146
8	10	2	Dale Earnhardt	Rod Osterlund Racing	Buick	199	+1 lap	10	147
9	37	14	Coo Coo Marlin	Cunningham-Kelley Racing	Chevrolet	198	+2 laps	0	138
10	24	79	Frank Warren	Warren Racing	Dodge	197	+3 laps	0	134
11	7	15	Bobby Allison	Bud Moore Engineering	Ford	197	+3 laps	1	135
12	15	67	Buddy Arrington	Arrington Racing	Dodge	197	+3 laps	0	127
13	35	40	D. K. Ulrich	Ulrich Racing	Buick	197	+3 laps	0	124
14	38	19	Bill Dennis	Gray Racing	Chevrolet	196	+4 laps	0	121
15	26	98	Ralph Jones	Ralph Jones	Ford	195	+5 laps	0	118
16	19	44	Terry Labonte	Hagan Racing	Buick	189	+11 laps	0	115
17	31	3	Richard Childress	Richard Childress Racing	Oldsmobile	188	+12 laps	0	112
18	5	27	Benny Parsons	M. C. Anderson Racing	Oldsmobile	183	+17 laps	37	114
19	17	50	Bruce Hill	Ballard Racing	Oldsmobile	168	+32 laps	0	106
20	36	39	Blackie Wangerin	Blackie Wangerin	Mercury	160	+40 laps	0	103
21	30	74	Bobby Wawak	Wawak Racing	Oldsmobile	152	Overheating	0	100
22	23	82	Paul Fess	Stan Lasky	Oldsmobile	135	Engine	0	97
23	21	41	Grant Adcox	Herb Adcox	Chevrolet	129	Wheel	0	94
24	12	02	Dave Marcis	Marcis Auto Racing	Chevrolet	119	Engine	0	91
25	29	70	J. D. McDuffie	McDuffie Racing	Oldsmobile	116	Engine	0	88
26	25	37	Dave Watson	Phil Howard	Chevrolet	115	Clutch	1	90
27	8	05	Dick Brooks	Nelson Malloch Racing	Oldsmobile	105	Transmission	0	82
28	22	00	John Utsman	Ed Whitaker	Chevrolet	101	Engine	0	79
29	16	47	Geoff Bodine	Race Hill Farm Team	Oldsmobile	99	Engine	6	81
30	40	54	Lennie Pond	Al Rudd	Oldsmobile	83	Brakes	2	78
31	11	90	Ricky Rudd	Donlavey Racing	Mercury	79	Engine	0	70
32	20	5	Neil Bonnett	Jim Stacy Racing	Oldsmobile	76	Suspension	12	72
33	14	12	Harry Gant	Kennie Childers Racing	Oldsmobile	72	Contact	0	64
34	41	25	Ronnie Thomas	Robertson Racing	Buick	64	Engine	0	61
35	27	87	Gary Balough	Billie Harvey	Oldsmobile	53	Contact	0	58
36	32	72	Joe Millikan	DeWitt Racing	Oldsmobile	53	Contact	0	55
37	9	21	David Pearson	Wood Brothers Racing	Mercury	53	Contact	0	52
38	18	17	Skip Manning	Hamby Motorsports	Oldsmobile	53	Contact	0	49
39	34	75	Butch Mock	RahMoc Enterprises	Buick	38	Contact	0	46
40	1	28	Buddy Baker	Ranier-Lundy Racing	Oldsmobile	38	Engine	15	48
41	39	89	Jim Vandiver	O. L. Nixon	Oldsmobile	27	Engine	0	40

=== Race statistics ===
- Lead changes: 36
- Cautions/Laps: 7 for 57 laps
- Average speed: 143.977 miles per hour (231.709 km/h)

== Media ==
The race was released on DVD in 2007. It aired again on Fox Sports 1 in February 2015 in a compressed 30-minute format hosted by Dale Earnhardt Jr. It was the subject of the documentary A Perfect Storm: The 1979 Daytona 500, featuring interviews of CBS Sports commentators, director Bob Fishman, and 1979 Daytona 500 drivers.

Preceded by 1979 Winston Western 500	NASCAR Winston Cup Series; 1979 season	Succeeded by 1979 Carolina 500
