= 1979 NASCAR Winston Cup Series =

American motorsport season

Seasons
- ← 1978 1980 →

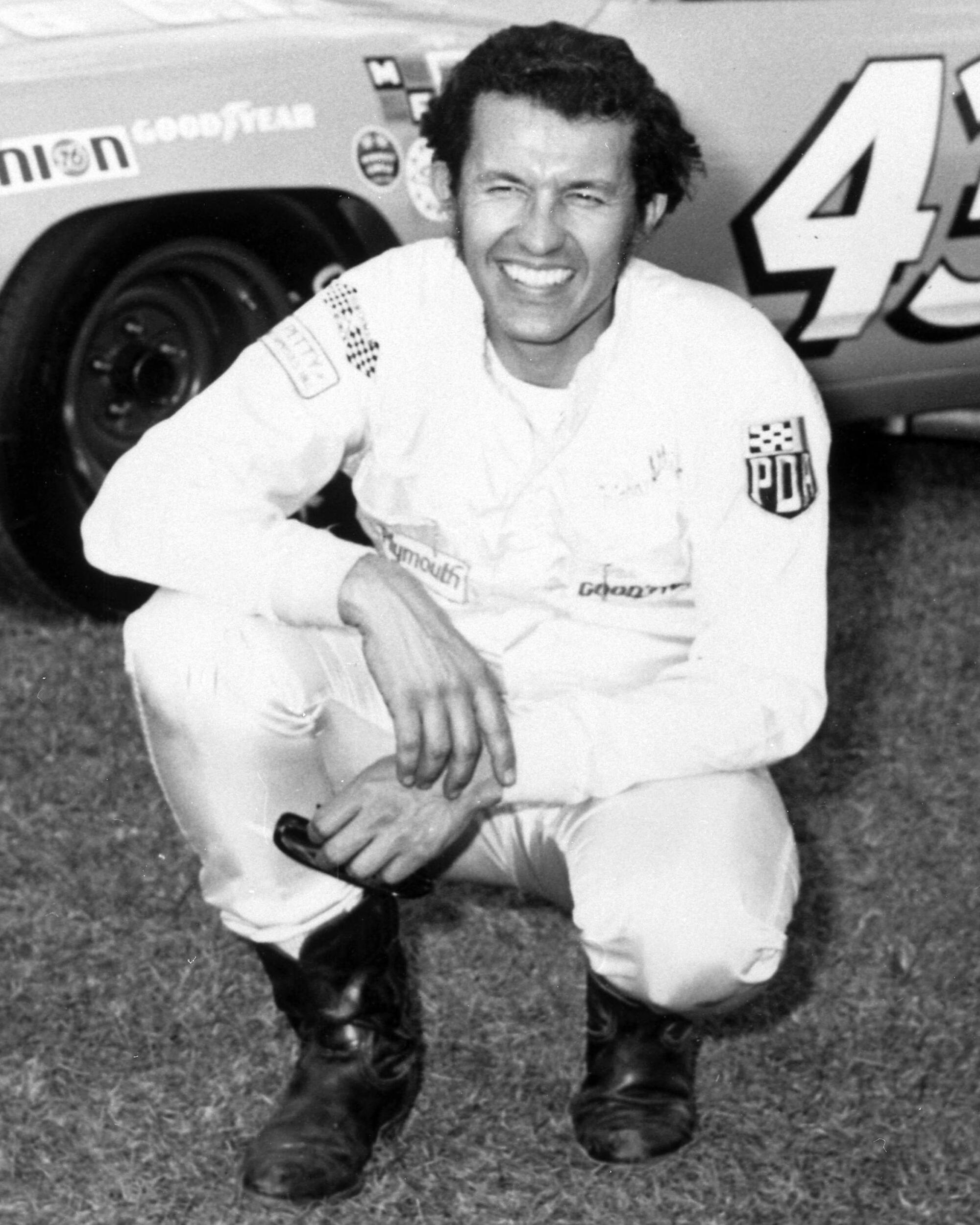
Richard Petty, the 1979 NASCAR Winston Cup Series Champion. This would be the final of his 7 championships.

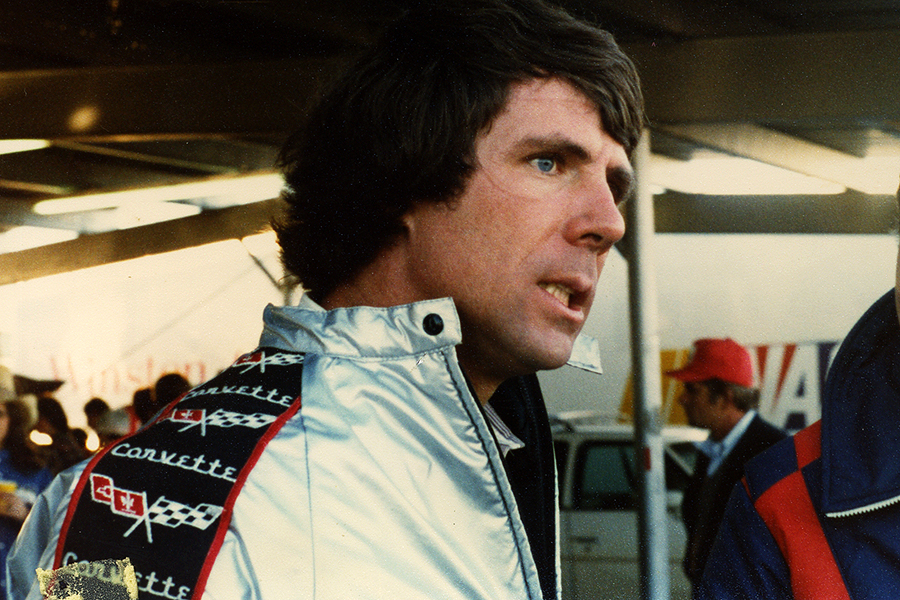
Darrell Waltrip finished second in the standings

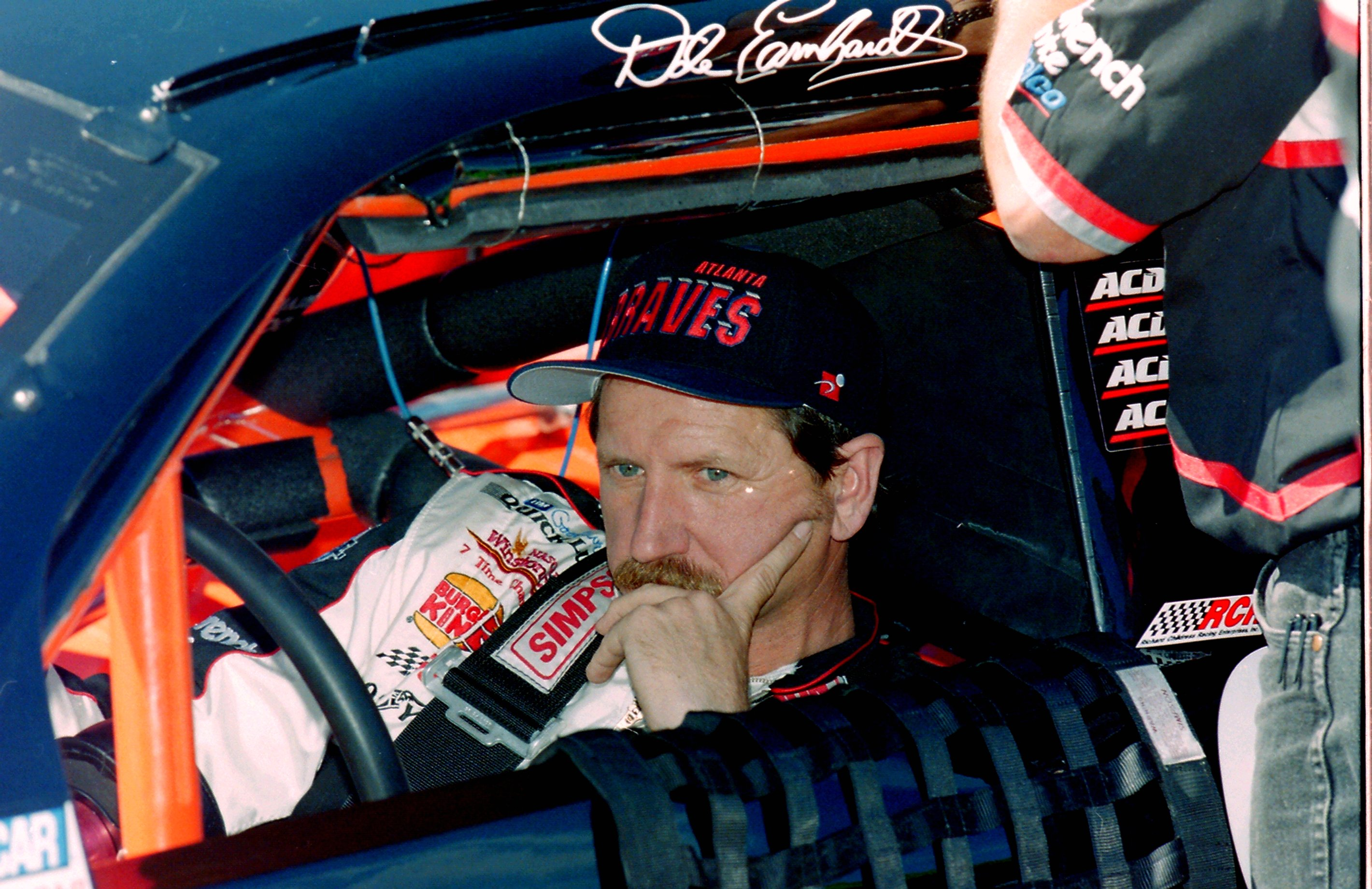
Dale Earnhardt, the 1979 rookie of the year.

The 1979 NASCAR Winston Cup Series was the 31st season of professional stock car racing in the United States and the 8th modern-era Cup series. It began on Sunday, January 14, and ended on Sunday, November 18. Richard Petty won his seventh and final Winston Cup championship, winning by 11 points over Darrell Waltrip. Dale Earnhardt was crowned NASCAR Rookie of the Year.

== Teams and drivers ==
=== Complete schedule ===
Make	Team	No.	Driver	Crew Chief
Dodge	Warren Racing	79	Frank Warren	
Ford	Bud Moore Engineering	15	Bobby Allison	Bud Moore
Buick Chevrolet	Ulrich Racing	40	D. K. Ulrich 30	
Buick Chevrolet	Ulrich Racing	40	Al Elmore 1	
Buick Chevrolet Oldsmobile	Rod Osterlund Racing	2	Dale Earnhardt (R) 27	Jake Elder
Buick Chevrolet Oldsmobile	Rod Osterlund Racing	2	David Pearson 4	Jake Elder
Buick Chevrolet Oldsmobile	Hagan Racing	44	Terry Labonte (R)	Darrell Bryant
Chevrolet Oldsmobile	DeWitt Racing	72	Joe Millikan (R)	Tex Powell
Chevrolet Oldsmobile	Hylton Racing	48/4	James Hylton	Kirk Shelmerdine
Chevrolet Oldsmobile	Junior Johnson & Associates	11	Cale Yarborough	Travis Carter
Chevrolet Oldsmobile	M. C. Anderson Racing	27	Benny Parsons	David Ifft
Chevrolet Oldsmobile	McDuffie Racing	70	J. D. McDuffie	
Chevrolet Oldsmobile	Petty Enterprises	43	Richard Petty	Dale Inman
Chevrolet Oldsmobile	Richard Childress Racing	3	Richard Childress	
Dodge Ford	Arrington Racing	67	Buddy Arrington	Joey Arrington

=== Limited schedule ===
Make	Team	No.	Driver	Crew Chief	Rounds
Buick	Ballard Racing	30	Tighe Scott	Harry Hyde	17
Buick	Ballard Racing	50	Bruce Hill		3
Buick	Gray Racing	19	Steve Spencer		1
Buick	Gray Racing	19	Dick May		1
Buick	Thirkettle Racing	51	Jim Thirkettle		1
Buick	Robertson Racing	25	Ronnie Thomas		6
Chevrolet	Al Rudd Auto	22	Richard White		2
Chevrolet	Al Rudd Auto	22	Kevin Housby		1
Chevrolet	Al Rudd Auto	22	Darrell Waltrip		1
Chevrolet	Al Rudd Auto	22	Al Rudd Jr.		1
Chevrolet	Al Holbert Racing	7	Al Holbert		5
Chevrolet	Cunningham-Kelley Racing	14	Coo Coo Marlin		7
Chevrolet	Cunningham-Kelley Racing	14	Dick Kranzler		2
Chevrolet	Cunningham-Kelley Racing	14	Sterling Marlin		1
Chevrolet	Cunningham-Kelley Racing	14	Jimmy Means		1
Chevrolet	DiGard Motorsports	88	Darrell Waltrip	Buddy Parrott	30
Chevrolet	Donlavey Racing	90	Ricky Rudd		2
Chevrolet	Ellington Racing	1	Donnie Allison	Runt Pittman	18
Chevrolet	Gray Racing	19	Vince Giamformaggio		2
Chevrolet	Gray Racing	19	Bill Dennis		2
Chevrolet	Gray Racing	19	Dick May		8
Chevrolet	Gray Racing	19	Joe Fields		1
Chevrolet	Gray Racing	19	Lennie Pond		5
Chevrolet	Gray Racing	19	Billy Hagan		1
Chevrolet	Gray Racing	19	Bob Burcham		2
Chevrolet	Gray Racing	19	Steve Spencer		1
Chevrolet	Gray Racing	19	Steve Gray		1
Chevrolet	Gray Racing	19	Cecil Gordon		2
Chevrolet	Gray Racing	19	Glenn Jarrett		1
Chevrolet	Gordon Racing	24	Larry Isley		1
Chevrolet	Goularte Racing	17	Harry Goularte		1
Chevrolet	Hamby Motorsports	17	Skip Manning		2
Chevrolet	Hamby Motorsports	17	Roger Hamby		8
Chevrolet	Hamby Motorsports	17	Jim Vandiver		1
Chevrolet	Hamby Motorsports	17	Steve Pfeifer		2
Chevrolet	Hamby Motorsports	17	Bill Elliott		3
Chevrolet	Kennie Childers Racing	12	Harry Gant	Kennie Childers	2
Chevrolet	Kennie Childers Racing	12	Lennie Pond	Kennie Childers	5
Chevrolet	Kennie Childers Racing	12	Jack Ingram	Kennie Childers	2
Chevrolet	Kennie Childers Racing	12	Butch Lindley	Kennie Childers	1
Chevrolet	Kennie Childers Racing	12	Buck Simmons	Kennie Childers	2
Chevrolet	Means Racing	52	Don Graham		1
Chevrolet	Means Racing	52	Jimmy Means		28
Chevrolet	Marcis Auto Racing	02	Dave Marcis		9
Chevrolet	Marcis Auto Racing	71	Dave Marcis		15
Chevrolet	Nelson Malloch Racing	05	Dick Brooks		27
Chevrolet	Nelson Malloch Racing	05	Elmo Langley		1
Chevrolet	Petty Enterprises	42	Kyle Petty	Maurice Petty	5
Chevrolet	Puskarich Racing	13	Don Puskarich		1
Chevrolet	Halverson Racing	13	Jeff Halverson		1
Chevrolet	Price Racing	45	Ferrel Harris		1
Chevrolet	Price Racing	45	Baxter Price		21
Chevrolet	Price Racing	45	Roy Smith		1
Chevrolet	Race Hill Farm Team	47	Harry Gant (R)		17
Chevrolet	Ranier-Lundy Racing	28	Buddy Baker	Waddell Wilson	21
Chevrolet	Robertson Racing	25	Ronnie Thomas		23
Chevrolet	Schmitt Racing	73	Steve Moore		1
Chevrolet	Slick Johnson Racing	51	Slick Johnson		2
Chevrolet	Williamson Racing	74	Tim Williamson		1
Chevrolet	Wawak Racing	74	Bobby Wawak		3
Dodge	Arrington Racing	7	Earl Brooks		1
Dodge	Canavan Racing	01	Earle Canavan		7
Dodge	Robbins Racing	6	Marty Robbins		1
Dodge	Robbins Racing	36	Marty Robbins		1
Dodge	Robbins Racing	42	Marty Robbins		1
Dodge	Petty Enterprises	42	Kyle Petty	Maurice Petty	1
Dodge	Marcis Auto Racing	71	Joey Arrington		1
Ford	Donlavey Racing	90	Ricky Rudd		11
Ford	Langley Racing	64	Tommy Gale		28
Ford	Langley Racing	64	Elmo Langley		1
Mercury	Donlavey Racing	90	Ricky Rudd		15
Mercury	Wood Brothers Racing	21	David Pearson	Leonard Wood	5
Mercury	Wood Brothers Racing	21	Neil Bonnett	Leonard Wood	17
Mercury	Elliott Racing	9	Bill Elliott	Ernie Elliott	9
Mercury	Elliott Racing	17	Bill Elliott	Ernie Elliott	2
Oldsmobile	A. J. Foyt Enterprises	51	A. J. Foyt		2
Oldsmobile	Al Holbert Racing	7	Al Holbert		1
Oldsmobile	Ballard Racing	50	Bruce Hill		4
Oldsmobile	Craker Racing	01	Jimmy Insolo		3
Oldsmobile	DiGard Motorsports	88	Darrell Waltrip	Buddy Parrott	4
Oldsmobile	Ellington Racing	1	Donnie Allison	Runt Pittman	2
Oldsmobile	Gordon Racing	24	Cecil Gordon		26
Oldsmobile	Gordon Racing	24	D. K. Ulrich		1
Oldsmobile	Hamby Motorsports	17	Roger Hamby		5
Oldsmobile	Hamby Motorsports	0	Roger Hamby		1
Oldsmobile	Kennie Childers Racing	12	Harry Gant	Kennie Childers	1
Oldsmobile	Kennie Childers Racing	12	Neil Bonnett	Kennie Childers	1
Oldsmobile	Kennie Childers Racing	12	Lennie Pond	Kennie Childers	3
Oldsmobile	Kennie Childers Racing	12	Jack Ingram	Kennie Childers	2
Oldsmobile	Nelson Malloch Racing	05	Dick Brooks		27
Oldsmobile	Price Racing	45	Baxter Price		4
Oldsmobile	Race Hill Farm Team	47	Geoff Bodine		3
Oldsmobile	Race Hill Farm Team	47	Harry Gant (R)		5
Oldsmobile	Ranier-Lundy Racing	28	Buddy Baker	Waddell Wilson	5
Oldsmobile	Schmitt Racing	73	Bill Schmitt		3
Oldsmobile	Wawak Racing	74	Bobby Wawak		1
Oldsmobile	Callentine Racing	74	Hal Callentine		2

== Schedule ==
No.	Race title	Track	Date
1	Winston Western 500	Riverside International Raceway, Riverside	January 14
	Busch Clash	Daytona International Speedway, Daytona Beach	February 11
	125 Mile Qualifying Races	Daytona International Speedway, Daytona Beach	February 15
2	Daytona 500	Daytona International Speedway, Daytona Beach	February 18
3	Carolina 500	North Carolina Motor Speedway, Rockingham	March 4
4	Richmond 400	Richmond Fairgrounds Raceway, Richmond	March 11
5	Atlanta 500	Atlanta International Raceway, Hampton	March 18
6	Northwestern Bank 400	North Wilkesboro Speedway, North Wilkesboro	March 25
7	Southeastern 500	Bristol International Raceway, Bristol	April 1
8	CRC Chemicals Rebel 500	Darlington Raceway, Darlington	April 8
9	Virginia 500	Martinsville Speedway, Ridgeway	April 22
10	Winston 500	Alabama International Motor Speedway, Talladega	May 6
11	Sun-Drop Music City USA 420	Nashville Speedway, Nashville	May 12
12	Mason-Dixon 500	Dover Downs International Speedway, Dover	May 20
13	World 600	Charlotte Motor Speedway, Concord	May 27
14	Texas 400	Texas World Speedway, College Station	June 3
15	NAPA Riverside 400	Riverside International Raceway, Riverside	June 10
16	Gabriel 400	Michigan International Speedway, Brooklyn	June 17
17	Firecracker 400	Daytona International Speedway, Daytona Beach	July 4
18	Busch Nashville 420	Nashville Speedway, Nashville	July 14
19	Coca-Cola 500	Pocono International Raceway, Long Pond	July 30
20	Talladega 500	Alabama International Motor Speedway, Talladega	August 5
21	Champion Spark Plug 400	Michigan International Speedway, Brooklyn	August 19
22	Volunteer 500	Bristol International Raceway, Bristol	August 25
23	Southern 500	Darlington Raceway, Darlington	September 3
24	Capital City 400	Richmond Fairgrounds Raceway, Richmond	September 9
25	CRC Chemicals 500	Dover Downs International Speedway, Dover	September 16
26	Old Dominion 500	Martinsville Speedway, Ridgeway	September 23
27	NAPA National 500	Charlotte Motor Speedway, Concord	October 7
28	Holly Farms 400	North Wilkesboro Speedway, North Wilkesboro	October 14
29	American 500	North Carolina Motor Speedway, Rockingham	October 21
30	Dixie 500	Atlanta International Raceway, Hampton	November 4
31	Los Angeles Times 500	Ontario Motor Speedway, Ontario	November 18

== Races ==
=== Winston Western 500 ===
The 1979 Winston Western 500 was run on January 14 at Riverside International Raceway at Riverside, California. David Pearson won the pole.

Top Ten Results
Fin	Car #	Driver	Status
1	88	Darrell Waltrip	2:53:30
2	21	David Pearson	Running
3	11	Cale Yarborough	Running
4	73	Bill Schmitt	-1 lap
5	1	Donnie Allison	-1 lap
6	72	Joe Millikan	-1 lap
7	28	Buddy Baker	-1 lap
8	51	Jim Thirkettle	-2 laps
9	74	Tim Williamson	-3 laps
10	12	Harry Gant	-3 laps

- This would be the final pole that Pearson would win with The Wood Brothers.
- This would also be the final top 5 finish Pearson would achieve with The Wood Brothers.

=== Busch Clash ===
The inaugural Busch Clash, a non-points race for all of the pole winners from the previous season, was run on February 11 at Daytona International Speedway in Daytona Beach, Florida. Benny Parsons started on the pole via a random draw.

Full Results
Fin	Car #	Driver	Laps	Status
1	28	Buddy Baker	20	0:15:26
2	88	Darrell Waltrip	20	Running
3	11	Cale Yarborough	20	Running
4	27	Benny Parsons	20	Running
5	15	Bobby Allison	20	Running
6	21	David Pearson	20	Running
7	54	Lennie Pond	20	Running
8	5	Neil Bonnett	20	Running
9	70	J. D. McDuffie	17	Engine

=== 125 Mile Qualifying Races ===
The two Daytona 500 125-mile qualifying races were run on February 15 at Daytona International Speedway in Daytona Beach, Florida. Buddy Baker and Donnie Allison started on the pole for races one and two, respectively.

Race One Top Ten Results				Race Two Top Ten Results			
Fin	Car #	Driver	Status	Fin	Car #	Driver	Status
1	28	Buddy Baker	0:44:45	1	88	Darrell Waltrip	0:49:01
2	11	Cale Yarborough	Running	2	51	A. J. Foyt	Running
3	27	Benny Parsons	Running	3	05	Dick Brooks	Running
4	15	Bobby Allison	Running	4	2	Dale Earnhardt	Running
5	21	David Pearson	Running	5	02	Dave Marcis	Running
6	90	Ricky Rudd	Running	6	12	Harry Gant	Running
7	43	Richard Petty	Running	7	47	Geoff Bodine	Running
8	67	Buddy Arrington	Running	8	17	Roger Hamby	Running
9	50	Bruce Hill	Running	9	5	Neil Bonnett	Running
10	44	Terry Labonte	Running	10	00	John Utsman	Running

Cale Yarborough was pessimistic about rivals' chances against Baker, saying "Baker is just pure horsepower."

=== Daytona 500 ===
The 21st annual Daytona 500 was run on February 18 at Daytona International Speedway in Daytona Beach, Florida. Buddy Baker won the pole.

Top Ten Results
Fin	Car #	Driver	Status
1	43	Richard Petty	3:28:22
2	88	Darrell Waltrip	Running
3	51	A. J. Foyt	Running
4	1	Donnie Allison	-1 lap (Crash)
5	11	Cale Yarborough	-1 lap (Crash)
6	30	Tighe Scott	-1 lap
7	68	Chuck Bown	-1 lap
8	2	Dale Earnhardt	-1 lap
9	14	Coo Coo Marlin	-2 laps
10	79	Frank Warren	-3 laps

- The race, the first televised nationally in its entirety, ended in spectacular fashion, as race leaders Donnie Allison and Cale Yarborough crashed on the last lap in turn three, allowing Richard Petty to take the lead and win his sixth Daytona 500. During the cool-down lap, Allison and Yarborough got into a heated argument which later escalated into a fist-fight, which was later joined by Bobby Allison, who stepped in to try to defend his brother. TV ratings were bolstered that day due to much of the U.S. Northeast being snowed in by a major blizzard.
- Petty would use the win as a springboard to his seventh and final championship, but it was going to be anything but easy.

=== Carolina 500 ===
The 1979 Carolina 500 was run on March 4 at North Carolina Motor Speedway in Rockingham, North Carolina. Bobby Allison won the pole.

Top Ten Results

1. 15–Bobby Allison
2. 72–Joe Millikan
3. 05–Dick Brooks
4. 30–Tighe Scott
5. 3–Richard Childress
6. 40–D. K. Ulrich
7. 48–James Hylton
8. 37–Dave Watson
9. 79–Frank Warren
10. 27–Benny Parsons
- The story of the race was Cale Yarborough and Donnie Allison, who crashed out of the lead on lap 10 in a wreck that swept up five other cars.
- Richard Petty who was involved in the lap 10 crash, had a crew member, one Maurice Petty involved in a post crash scuffle with NASCAR officials. Maurice was suspended by NASCAR for the next two Cup Series races.
- Bobby Allison's victory would make him the last Ford driver to win this particular race until Bill Elliott in 1992.

=== Richmond 400 ===
The 1979 Richmond 400 was scheduled for February 25 at Richmond Fairgrounds Raceway in Richmond, Virginia but it was postponed due to heavy snow. It was finally run on March 11 even though the track had a snow shower before race time which delayed the start by fifteen minutes. Bobby Allison won the pole.

Top Ten Results

1. 11–Cale Yarborough
2. 15–Bobby Allison
3. 88–Darrell Waltrip
4. 27–Benny Parsons
5. 43–Richard Petty
6. 72–Joe Millikan
7. 70–J. D. McDuffie
8. 44–Terry Labonte
9. 1 –Donnie Allison
10. 40–D. K. Ulrich

=== Atlanta 500 ===
The 1979 Atlanta 500 was run on March 18 at Atlanta International Raceway in Hampton, Georgia. Buddy Baker won the pole.

Top Ten Results

1. 28–Buddy Baker
2. 15–Bobby Allison
3. 88–Darrell Waltrip
4. 11–Cale Yarborough
5. 27–Benny Parsons
6. 02–Dave Marcis
7. 1–Donnie Allison
8. 72–Joe Millikan
9. 90–Ricky Rudd
10. 05–Dick Brooks
- After a late race yellow, Baker got tires and stormed away from Bobby Allison (who led the most laps) for his first win since May 1976.
- The race was marred by the death of pit crew member Dennis Wade, who was struck and killed on pit road by Dave Watson.

=== Northwestern Bank 400 ===
The 1979 Northwestern Bank 400 was run on March 25 at North Wilkesboro Speedway in North Wilkesboro, North Carolina. Benny Parsons won the pole.

Top Ten Results

1. 15–Bobby Allison
2. 43–Richard Petty
3. 27–Benny Parsons
4. 2–Dale Earnhardt
5. 88–Darrell Waltrip
6. 70–J. D. McDuffie
7. 3–Richard Childress
8. 28–Buddy Baker
9. 11–Cale Yarborough
10. 72–Joe Millikan
- When Bobby Allison crossed the line to win the race, his right front tire blew. His car was too damaged from running on the wheel rim to make the trip to victory lane, so Allison had to walk to victory lane.
- This was Fords first victory in the Cup Series spring race since 1968. This was Fords first victory at the track since the 1969 Cup Series fall race.

=== Southeastern 500 ===
The 1979 Southeastern 500 was run on April 1 at Bristol International Raceway in Bristol, Tennessee. Buddy Baker won the pole.

Top Ten Results

1. 2–Dale Earnhardt
2. 15–Bobby Allison
3. 88–Darrell Waltrip
4. 43–Richard Petty
5. 27–Benny Parsons
6. 1–Donnie Allison
7. 44–Terry Labonte
8. 72–Joe Millikan
9. 48–James Hylton
10. 90–Ricky Rudd
- This was Dale Earnhardt's first Winston Cup career victory.

=== CRC Chemicals Rebel 500 ===
The 1979 CRC Chemicals Rebel 500 was run on April 8 at Darlington Raceway in Darlington, South Carolina. Donnie Allison won the pole.

Top Ten Results

1. 88–Darrell Waltrip
2. 43–Richard Petty
3. 1–Donnie Allison
4. 27–Benny Parsons
5. 28–Buddy Baker
6. 11–Cale Yarborough
7. 9–Bill Elliott
8. 90–Ricky Rudd
9. 05–Dick Brooks
10. 72–Joe Millikan
- Waltrip won this race following a fierce duel with Richard Petty; they exchanged the lead eight times in the final five laps and three times on the last lap alone.
- This was also David Pearson's last race with the Wood Brothers, for whom he had driven the #21 Mercury since 1972. Following a tire-change pit stop, Pearson reached the pit road exit, when two tires came off his car (the lug nuts had not been tightened when he left the pits). Within a week, Pearson was fired from the team and replaced by Neil Bonnett.

=== Virginia 500 ===
The 1979 Virginia 500 was run on April 22 at Martinsville Speedway in Martinsville, Virginia. Darrell Waltrip won the pole.

Top Ten Results

1. 43–Richard Petty
2. 28–Buddy Baker
3. 88–Darrell Waltrip
4. 15–Bobby Allison
5. 72–Joe Millikan
6. 47–Harry Gant
7. 48–James Hylton
8. 2–Dale Earnhardt
9. 44–Terry Labonte
10. 70–J. D. McDuffie
- This was Petty's first win on a short track since 1975 and his first win in a Chevrolet.
- Neil Bonnett, in his first start driving for Wood Brothers Racing after longtime driver David Pearson was fired, finished 25th after blowing an engine on lap 207.

=== Winston 500 ===
The 1979 Winston 500 was run on May 6 at Alabama International Motor Speedway in Talladega, Alabama. Darrell Waltrip won the pole.

Top Ten Results

1. 15–Bobby Allison
2. 88–Darrell Waltrip
3. 67–Buddy Arrington
4. 43–Richard Petty
5. 72–Joe Millikan
6. 9–Bill Elliott
7. 64–Tommy Gale
8. 79–Frank Warren
9. 44–Terry Labonte
10. 14–Coo Coo Marlin
- A 17-car crash erupted on the fourth lap when race-leader Baker blew a tire; Cale Yarborough came to a stop and got out of his car, then was hit by Dave Marcis' car, momentarily losing feeling in his legs; he recovered later that day.
- This was Ford’s first win at Talladega since the 1976 Winston 500. Ford products now stood with ten victories (six by Mercury) at the track.

=== Sun-Drop Music City USA 420 ===
The 1979 Sun-Drop Music City USA 420 was run on May 12 at Nashville Speedway in Nashville, Tennessee. Joe Millikan won the pole.

Top Ten Results

1. 11–Cale Yarborough
2. 43–Richard Petty
3. 15–Bobby Allison
4. 2–Dale Earnhardt
5. 70–J. D. McDuffie
6. 3–Richard Childress
7. 27–Benny Parsons
8. 28–Buddy Baker
9. 44–Terry Labonte
10. 90–Ricky Rudd
- The finish was marred by controversy. Richard Petty and Bobby Allison asserted that Cale Yarborough was a lap down at the finish. Petty said, "He lost one lap when he spun (with J. D. McDuffie), then he lost another when he spent 22 seconds in the pits." Allison agreed, saying, "Richard won this race and I finished second. I don't know how they had Cale winning."

=== Mason-Dixon 500 ===
The 1979 Mason-Dixon 500 was run on May 20 at Dover Downs International Speedway in Dover, Delaware. Darrell Waltrip won the pole.

Top Ten Results

1. 21–Neil Bonnett
2. 11–Cale Yarborough
3. 28–Buddy Baker
4. 15–Bobby Allison
5. 2–Dale Earnhardt
6. 44–Terry Labonte
7. 27–Benny Parsons
8. 72–Joe Millikan
9. 12–Lennie Pond
10. 67–Buddy Arrington
- Neil Bonnett was supposed to attempt to qualify for the 1979 Indianapolis 500 the previous day (Saturday) but qualifying for the Cup race was postponed to Saturday following heavy rain which forced him to withdraw from qualifying at Indy. He was rewarded by winning his first race with The Wood Brothers.
- This would be Mercury's final victory at Dover.

=== World 600 ===
The 1979 World 600 was run on May 27 at Charlotte Motor Speedway in Concord, North Carolina. Neil Bonnett won the pole.

Top Ten Results

1. 88–Darrell Waltrip
2. 43–Richard Petty
3. 2–Dale Earnhardt
4. 11–Cale Yarborough
5. 27–Benny Parsons
6. 90–Ricky Rudd
7. 44–Terry Labonte
8. 7–Al Holbert
9. 12–Lennie Pond
10. 3–Richard Childress
- The race saw 59 lead changes, a still-standing track record.

=== Texas 400 ===
The 1979 Texas 400 was run on June 3 at Texas World Speedway in College Station, Texas. Buddy Baker won the pole.

Top Ten Results

1. 88–Darrell Waltrip
2. 15–Donnie Allison
3. 28–Buddy Baker
4. 11–Cale Yarborough
5. 44–Terry Labonte
6. 43–Richard Petty
7. 3–Richard Childress
8. 72–Joe Millikan
9. 67–Buddy Arrington
10. 48–James Hylton
- This was NASCAR's first visit to the track in College Station, Texas since 1973; the track had closed in 1974 but reopened with USAC Gold Crown racing in 1976.

=== NAPA Riverside 400 ===
The 1979 NAPA Riverside 400 was run on June 10 at Riverside International Raceway in Riverside, California. Dale Earnhardt won his first Cup Series pole of his Hall of Fame career.

1. 15–Bobby Allison
2. 88–Darrell Waltrip
3. 43–Richard Petty
4. 11–Cale Yarborough
5. 27–Benny Parsons
6. 3–Richard Childress
7. 70–J. D. McDuffie
8. 93–Norm Palmer
9. 67–Buddy Arrington
10. 72–Joe Millikan
- This was the first victory for the Ford nameplate at Riverside since the 1970 Motor Trend 500.
- This was also Fords penultimate victory at Riverside.

=== Gabriel 400 ===
The 1979 Gabriel 400 was run on June 17 at Michigan International Speedway in Brooklyn, Michigan. Neil Bonnett won the pole.

Top Ten Results

1. 28–Buddy Baker
2. 1–Donnie Allison
3. 11–Cale Yarborough
4. 21–Neil Bonnett
5. 43–Richard Petty
6. 2–Dale Earnhardt
7. 15–Bobby Allison
8. 90–Ricky Rudd
9. 30–Tighe Scott
10. 05–Dick Brooks
- The lead changed 47 times among 11 drivers. Dale Earnhardt was criticized by Darrell Waltrip and Richard Petty when he nearly spun out trying to pass Neil Bonnett late in the race in front of both "He nearly took us all out in the third turn" Waltrip said after the race.

=== Firecracker 400 ===
The 1979 Firecracker 400 was run on July 4 at Daytona International Speedway in Daytona Beach, Florida. Buddy Baker won the pole.

Top Ten Results

1. 21–Neil Bonnett
2. 27–Benny Parsons
3. 2–Dale Earnhardt
4. 88–Darrell Waltrip
5. 43–Richard Petty
6. 68–Chuck Bown
7. 47–Harry Gant
8. 72–Joe Millikan
9. 05–Dick Brooks
10. 51–A. J. Foyt
- This was Mercury's penultimate victory at Daytona.
- Kyle Petty crashed in qualifying attempting to make his first Winston Cup start. That would come a few races later at Talladega

=== Busch Nashville 420 ===
The 1979 Busch Nashville 420 was run on July 14 at Nashville Speedway in Nashville, Tennessee. Darrell Waltrip won the pole.

Top Ten Results

1. 88–Darrell Waltrip
2. 11–Cale Yarborough
3. 2–Dale Earnhardt
4. 27–Benny Parsons
5. 43–Richard Petty
6. 48–James Hylton
7. 3–Richard Childress
8. 70–J. D. McDuffie
9. 25–Ronnie Thomas
10. 52–Jimmy Means

=== Coca-Cola 500 ===
The 1979 Coca-Cola 500 was initially scheduled for July 29 but day-long rains forced postponement and it was run on July 30 at Pocono International Raceway in Long Pond, Pennsylvania. Harry Gant won the pole.

Top Ten Results

1. 11–Cale Yarborough
2. 43–Richard Petty
3. 28–Buddy Baker
4. 27–Benny Parsons
5. 90–Ricky Rudd
6. 72–Joe Millikan
7. 22–Darrell Waltrip
8. 21–Neil Bonnett
9. 15–Bobby Allison
10. 30–Tighe Scott
- The lead changed a still-standing track record 55 times.
- Dale Earnhardt suffered broken collar bones in a bad crash in Turn Two.
- Darrell Waltrip lost five spots when he pitted under yellow with four to go for tires but the race never restarted. It cost him 19 points, a margin he would regret at the end of the season.
- After crashing the main car in practice before the race, DiGard Motorsports bought out the #22 Chevrolet from Al Rudd Auto for Waltrip to race in.

=== Talladega 500 ===
The 1979 Talladega 500 was run on August 5 at Alabama International Motor Speedway in Talladega, Alabama. Neil Bonnett won the pole.

Top Ten Results

1. 88–Darrell Waltrip
2. 2–David Pearson
3. 90–Ricky Rudd
4. 43–Richard Petty
5. 77–Jody Ridley
6. 30–Tighe Scott
7. 47–Harry Gant
8. 67–Buddy Arrington
9. 42–Kyle Petty
10. 3–Richard Childress
- This was David Pearson's first race after leaving the Wood Brothers following the spring Darlington race. Pearson was hired to drive the #2 temporarily after Dale Earnhardt's injury.
- Kyle Petty’s first career Cup start.

=== Champion Spark Plug 400 ===
The 1979 Champion Spark Plug 400 was run on August 19 at Michigan International Speedway in Brooklyn, Michigan. David Pearson won the pole.

Top Ten Results

1. 43–Richard Petty
2. 28–Buddy Baker
3. 27–Benny Parsons
4. 2–David Pearson
5. 08–John Anderson
6. 72–Joe Millikan
7. 90–Ricky Rudd
8. 30–Tighe Scott
9. 70–J. D. McDuffie
10. 3–Richard Childress
- Blackie Wangerin flipped out of the track on lap 2 resulting in a lengthy red flag to rebuild the turn 3 and 4 guardrails.

=== Volunteer 500 ===
The 1979 Volunteer 500 was run on August 25 at Bristol International Raceway in Bristol, Tennessee. Richard Petty won his final pole as a driver and last for his racecar until 1996.

Top Ten Results

1. 88–Darrell Waltrip
2. 43–Richard Petty
3. 15–Bobby Allison
4. 27–Benny Parsons
5. 11–Cale Yarborough
6. 72–Joe Millikan
7. 2–David Pearson
8. 44–Terry Labonte
9. 90–Ricky Rudd
10. 17–Bill Elliott

=== Southern 500 ===
The 1979 Southern 500 was run on September 3 at Darlington Raceway in Darlington, South Carolina. Bobby Allison won the pole.

Top Ten Results

1. 2–David Pearson
2. 17–Bill Elliott
3. 44–Terry Labonte
4. 28–Buddy Baker
5. 27–Benny Parsons
6. 71–Dave Marcis
7. 05–Dick Brooks
8. 90–Ricky Rudd
9. 43–Richard Petty
10. 15–Bobby Allison
- David Pearson won the race for Rod Osterlund. This was Pearson's last race for Osterlund because Dale Earnhardt was back for the Capital City 400 due to a crash at Pocono with rib injuries.
- This is the last race not featuring the Earnhardt name on the grid until the 2012 Charlotte fall race.
- Darrell Waltrip had over a lap lead when he had an accident. Darrell Waltrip had to make a pit stop which put David Pearson on the lead lap as well. Waltrip was passed by David Pearson and then involved in a second accident. David Pearson would win by 2 laps over second place.
- First career top 5 for Bill Elliott.

=== Capital City 400 ===
The 1979 Capital City 400 was run on September 9 at Richmond Fairgrounds Raceway in Richmond, Virginia. Dale Earnhardt won the pole in his return race after being forced to sit out the previous four races due to injury.

Top Ten Results

1. 15–Bobby Allison
2. 88–Darrell Waltrip
3. 90–Ricky Rudd
4. 2–Dale Earnhardt
5. 11–Cale Yarborough
6. 43–Richard Petty
7. 71–Dave Marcis
8. 27–Benny Parsons
9. 47–Harry Gant
10. 72–Joe Millikan

=== CRC Chemicals 500 ===
The 1979 CRC Chemicals 500 was run on September 16 at Dover Downs International Speedway in Dover, Delaware. Dale Earnhardt won the pole.

Top Ten Results

1. 43–Richard Petty
2. 1–Donnie Allison
3. 11–Cale Yarborough
4. 28–Buddy Baker
5. 72–Joe Millikan
6. 15–Bobby Allison
7. 71–Dave Marcis
8. 90–Ricky Rudd
9. 2–Dale Earnhardt
10. 30–Tighe Scott

=== Old Dominion 500 ===
The 1979 Old Dominion 500 was run on September 23 at Martinsville Speedway in Martinsville, Virginia. Darrell Waltrip won the pole.

Top Ten Results

1. 28–Buddy Baker
2. 43–Richard Petty
3. 72–Joe Millikan
4. 15–Bobby Allison
5. 71–Dave Marcis
6. 90–Ricky Rudd
7. 67–Buddy Arrington
8. 11–Cale Yarborough
9. 44–Terry Labonte
10. 40–D. K. Ulrich
- Waltrip blew his engine after leading 188 laps; the DiGard team changed engines in a record 11 minutes. NASCAR outlawed mid-race engine changes after the 1979 season citing costs.

=== NAPA National 500 ===
The 1979 NAPA National 500 was run on October 7 at Charlotte Motor Speedway in Concord, North Carolina. Neil Bonnett won the pole; it was the thirteenth straight Charlotte pole for the Wood Brothers.

Top Ten Results

1. 11–Cale Yarborough
2. 15–Bobby Allison
3. 88–Darrell Waltrip
4. 43–Richard Petty
5. 1–Donnie Allison
6. 27–Benny Parsons
7. 9–Bill Elliott
8. 05–Dick Brooks
9. 40–D. K. Ulrich
10. 2–Dale Earnhardt

=== Holly Farms 400 ===
The 1979 Holly Farms 400 was run on October 14 at North Wilkesboro Speedway in North Wilkesboro, North Carolina. Dale Earnhardt won the pole. The race had been postponed two weeks due to rain.

Top Ten Results

1. 27–Benny Parsons
2. 15–Bobby Allison
3. 43–Richard Petty
4. 2–Dale Earnhardt
5. 90–Ricky Rudd
6. 44–Terry Labonte
7. 25–Ronnie Thomas
8. 40–D. K. Ulrich
9. 67–Buddy Arrington
10. 3–Richard Childress
- The story of the race was between Bobby Allison and Darrell Waltrip. On lap 309 Waltrip sideswiped past Allison in turn 3; coming onto the frontstretch Allison hooked Waltrip head-on into the wall. Benny Parsons took the lead at that point. Waltrip got repairs and under yellow began crowding Allison to the wall. NASCAR black-flagged Waltrip, but after pitting he went after Allison again. NASCAR competition director Bill Gazaway went onto the track and personally waved another black flag to Waltrip, making sure Waltrip stayed out of the way of the leaders. The wreck narrowed Waltrip's point lead over Richard Petty to just 17 points.

=== American 500 ===
The 1979 American 500 was run on October 21 at North Carolina Motor Speedway in Rockingham, North Carolina. Buddy Baker won the pole.

Top Ten Results

1. 43–Richard Petty
2. 27–Benny Parsons
3. 11–Cale Yarborough
4. 1–Donnie Allison
5. 2–Dale Earnhardt
6. 88–Darrell Waltrip
7. 3–Richard Childress
8. 25–Ronnie Thomas
9. 71–Dave Marcis
10. 51–Slick Johnson
- With the win and Waltrip finishing 6th, Petty finished erasing a 229-point gap to Waltrip and led the points standings by 8 points with two races remaining in the season.

=== Dixie 500 ===
The 1979 Dixie 500 was run on November 4 at Atlanta International Raceway in Hampton, Georgia. Buddy Baker won the pole, his seventh of the season and locked up the season long pole award.

Top Ten Results

1. 21–Neil Bonnett
2. 2–Dale Earnhardt
3. 11–Cale Yarborough
4. 15–Bobby Allison
5. 88–Darrell Waltrip
6. 43–Richard Petty
7. 44–Terry Labonte
8. 90–Ricky Rudd
9. 72–Joe Millikan
10. 77–Jody Ridley
- By virtue of finishing ahead of Petty and getting 5 bonus points for leading a lap when Petty did not lead any laps during the race, Waltrip re-took the points lead by two points over Petty going into the season finale at Ontario; it was the second straight race where the point lead changed hands.

=== Los Angeles Times 500 ===
The 1979 Los Angeles Times 500 was run on November 18 at Ontario Motor Speedway in Ontario, California. Cale Yarborough won the pole and became the last driver to qualify for the 1980 Busch Clash.

Top Ten Results

1. 27–Benny Parsons
2. 15–Bobby Allison
3. 11–Cale Yarborough
4. 28–Buddy Baker
5. 43–Richard Petty
6. 21–Neil Bonnett
7. 05–Dick Brooks
8. 88–Darrell Waltrip
9. 2–Dale Earnhardt
10. 90–Ricky Rudd
- Waltrip finished a lap down when he spun with John Rezek and pitted before the leaders did. Richard Petty won the championship by 11 points, then the smallest margin of victory in NASCAR history and the first time in the sanctioning body's history the point lead changed hands in the final race.
- This would be the last time until 1992 where an owner/driver would win the championship (Alan Kulwicki).

== Full Drivers’ Championship ==
(key) Bold – Pole position awarded by time. Italics – Pole position set by owner's points. * – Most laps led.

Pos.	Driver	RIV	DAY	CAR	RCH	ATL	NWS	BRI	DAR	MAR	TAL	NSV	DOV	CLT	TWS	RIV	MCH	DAY	NSV	POC	TAL	MCH	BRI	DAR	RCH	DOV	MAR	CLT	NWS	CAR	ATL	ONT	Pts
1	Richard Petty	32	1	32	5	11	2*	4	2	1*	4	2*	30	2	6	3	5	5	5	2	4	1	**2**	9	6	1	2	4	3	1	6	5	4830
2	Darrell Waltrip	1*	2	17	3	3	5	3	1*	**3**	**2**	21	**18**	1*	1*	2	13	4	**1***	7	1*	19	1	11*	2	29	**11**	3	13	6	5	8	4819
3	Bobby Allison	19	11	**1***	**2***	2*	1	2	26	4	1	3	4	22	2	1	7	30	16	9	28	23	3	**10**	1*	6	4	2	2*	19	4	2	4633
4	Cale Yarborough	3	5	18	1	4	9	24	6	11	33	1	2*	4	4	4	3	20	2	1	24	17	5	19	5	3*	8	1	20	3	3*	**3***	4604
5	Benny Parsons	26	18	10	4	5	**3**	5	4	19	35	7	7	5	25	5	31	2	4	4	21	3	4*	5	8	22	27	6	1	2*	31	1	4256
6	Joe Millikan **(R)**	6	36	2	6	8	10	8	10	5	5	**23**	8	27	8	10	30	8	21	6	25	6	6	15	10	5	3	29	15	18	9	12	4014
7	Dale Earnhardt **(R)**	21	8	12	13	12	4	1*	23	8	36	4	5	3	12	**13**	6	3	3	29					**4**	**9**	29	10	**4**	5	2	9	3749
8	Richard Childress	15	17	5	26	20	7	11	16	14	24	6	29	10	7	6	23	37	7	12	10	10	11	29	15	13	13	14	10	7	15	16	3735
9	Ricky Rudd		31	34	11	9	14	10	8	12	27	10	14	6	28		8	13		5	3	7	9	8	3	8	6	11	5	20	8	10	3642
10	Terry Labonte **(R)**	35	16	15	8	25	15	7	29	9	9	9	6	7	5	18	25	29	25	23	33	26	8	3	17	25	9	15	6	27	7	13	3615
11	Buddy Arrington	18	12	19	15	29	25	13	25	22	3	26	10	12	9	9	15	15	17	22	8	20	14	14	13	32	7	12	9	17	17	19	3589
12	D. K. Ulrich	14	13	6	10	14	18	12	12	15	21	16	12	18	15	33	21	18	23	11	27	28	12	13	12	12	10	9	8	28	25	33	3508
13	J. D. McDuffie	17	25	25	7	17	6	26	19	10	31	5	13	13	14	7	14	21	8	13	18	9	26	18	14	27	21	22	28	25	12	31	3473
14	James Hylton	11	DNQ	7	12	13	16	9	15	7	15	22	17	33	10	14	20	19	6	33	20	12	13	38	21	14	23	23	11	11	16	26	3405
15	Buddy Baker	7	**40**	31	29	**1**	8	**25**	5	2	32	8	3	36	**3**		1*	**34**		3	39	2*		4		4	1*	25		**33**	**39**	4	3249
16	Frank Warren	27	10	9	21	22	17	20	17	18	8	20	21	21	19	22	22	40	14	19	23	16	17	22	26	18	16	19	26	24	21	25	3199
17	Ronnie Thomas	12	34	29	17	34	28	23	24	20	25	17	16	14	26	23	27		9	14	22	24	27	24	23	24	20	38	7	8	28	27	2912
18	Tommy Gale		DNQ	13	22	21	20	18	34	16	7	13	19	20	20		33	27	28	17	36	14	15	21	24	15	22	21	27	12	22	34	2795
19	Cecil Gordon	25	DNQ	11	25	23	22	15	31	17	11		23	17	21	11		35	11	18	40	18	22	26	18	20	24	32	18	13	38	24	2737
20	Dave Marcis	24	24	16	16	6	12	17	27	26	14			26			26	17			31	30	18	6	7	7	5	37	21	9	23	17	2736
21	Harry Gant **(R)**	10	33	26				21		6	39	28	25	23			17	7	22	**15**	7	25	16	12	9	28	12	20	14	21	11	20	2664
22	Dick Brooks	33	27	3	28	10	13	22	9	21	37	27	QL	39			10	9	19	20	11	29	20	7		26	15	8	25	15	40	7	2622
23	Jimmy Means		DNQ	24	27	33	30	28	30	28	12	11	31		23	31	16	22	10	16	13	22	19	16	20	16	17	40	24	31	19		2575
24	Donnie Allison	5	4*	30	9	7	11	6	**3**	27	23			37			2	12			30			31		2		5		4	35	11	2508
25	Baxter Price			14	23	19	23	19	20	24	26	19	15		27	17			18	31	26	21	24	23	19	31	14	24	17	22			2364
26	Neil Bonnett	34	32	33					13	25	17*		1	**25**		28	**4**	1*		8	**34**	33		32		21	18	**31**		29	1	6	2223
27	Tighe Scott		6	4		37				13	34		24	16			9	14		10	6	8		35		10		13		37	29		1879
28	Bill Elliott		DNQ			36			7		6			38			12	11			12	11	10	2	11			7		23			1548
29	Lennie Pond		30		14				11	29	38		9	9	31		11	28		34		31		25	25	23							1415
30	Dick May		DNQ	20		24	21	27	33	30	20		11		30				29	28	41		21	34		34	25	17		26	41		1390
31	Roger Hamby		DNQ	21	30	26	19	14	32		DNQ						29	26	13	38						17	19		12				1231
32	David Pearson	**2**	37	23		18			22												2	**4**	7	1									1203
33	Coo Coo Marlin		9			38					10			30				25			29			36									613
34	Bruce Hill		19			15					DNQ			24	13			41			16											15	594
35	Blackie Wangerin		20			30					28			15				24			37	36											571
36	Grant Adcox		23			28								11				33			19										27		560
37	Kyle Petty													Wth				Wth			9	13						18			32	14	559
38	Chuck Bown		7			16				23	DNQ			40				6						17				33					523
39	John Anderson																					5				11		16			24		496
40	Ralph Jones		15			31		30			DNQ								24					37							30		477
41	Earle Canavan		Wth						35						18					27		34		39	22	33							456
42	Nelson Oswald		Wth	28			26					25	22						27	25													431
43	Slick Johnson			27			24																							10	13		431
44	Dave Watson		26	8	18	32																											413
45	Al Holbert	20							21					8				32		37	38												402
46	Bobby Wawak		21					29	28			14																					376
47	Jody Ridley																				5							26			10		374
48	Bill Hollar		Wth	35	24		29				DNQ															30	30						371
49	Rick Newsom																	23		26	15					35							355
50	Bill Schmitt	4														30																18	342
51	Ed Negre		Wth						18		13													20									336
52	John Kennedy		Wth			39											18					15	30						23				322
53	Tim Williamson	9														26																22	320
54	Richard White	29														16																30	264
55	Jimmy Insolo	16														25																36	258
56	H. B. Bailey														16							35		27							20		255
57	Elmo Langley												28			35											DNQ						246
58	Jim Robinson	30														21																32	240
59	Henry Jones																		26				29						29				237
60	Steve Spencer											12							20														230
61	Travis Tiller		Wth						36		40			35				36												34			229
62	Jim Vandiver		41											19										28				34					225
63	Bill Elswick																								16				19	14			221
64	Jack Ingram																				35		25	30				36					219
65	Jimmy Finger										19				34			39															213
66	Wayne Watercutter																		12	32											26		212
67	Bob Burcham																24				14												212
68	Mike Potter							16							22								23							35			209
69	John Rezek		DNQ												11													28			36	35	209
70	Marty Robbins																35				32	27											207
71	Steve Peles												20							21													203
72	Bill Dennis		14											28																			200
73	Buck Simmons																														14	29	197
74	Dave Dion				19																						26						191
75	Mike Kempton		Wth									18			29																		185
76	Vince Giaformaggio	13																														37	176
77	Connie Saylor		DNQ								18			34																			170
78	Paul Fess		22														32																164
79	Sandy Satullo II		Wth														19	38															155
80	David Sosebee																28											27			33		146
81	Norm Palmer															8																DNQ	142
82	Jim Thirkettle	8																															142
83	Geoff Bodine		29	22		35																											139
84	Louis Gatto												27							36													137
85	Steve Pfeifer	DNQ														32												30			34		134
86	Sterling Marlin																		15														123
87	Butch Hartman								14																								121
88	Al Elmore											15																					118
89	Ed Hale	DNQ														15																	118
90	Gary Balough		35															16		35													116
91	Keith Davis					40					30																						116
92	Skip Manning		38											32																			116
93	Kevin Housby										16																						115
94	Ernie Shaw																												16				115
95	Billy Hagan														17																		112
96	Steve Moore										DNQ										17												112
97	Nestor Peles		DNQ																							19							106
98	Dick Whalen															19																DNQ	106
99	John Borneman	QL														20																	103
100	Joe Fields				20																												103
101	Roy Smith																															21	100
102	Don Graham	22																															97
103	Larry Isley																												22				97
104	Jerry Jolly		DNQ								22																						97
105	Hal Callentine															12																23	94
106	Harry Goularte	23																															94
107	Jim Hurlbert														24																		91
108	Jocko Maggiacomo		Wth																	24													91
109	Robert Tartaglia	DNQ														24																	91
110	Joey Arrington												26																				85
111	Rick McCray	DNQ														27																	82
112	Butch Lindley																										28						79
113	Don Puskarich	28																															79
114	John Utsman		28																														79
115	Dick Kranzler															29																DNQ	76
116	Wayne Broome										29									30													73
117	Bobby Fisher		QL											31																			70
118	Don Noel	31																															70
119	Glenn Jarrett													29																32			67
120	Bill Meazill														32																		67
121	Billy Smith																							33									64
122	Bobby Brack																											35					63
123	Chris Monoleos															34																	61
124	Jeff Halverson																									36							55
125	Bill Seifert																36																55
126	Bub Strickler																													36			55
127	Richard Brickhouse																											39					46
128	Steve Gray																			39													46
129	Butch Mock		39										Wth																				46
130	Ron Hutcherson													41																			40
131	Randy Ogden																													30	37	28	
132	A. J. Foyt		3															10															
133	Freddy Smith																													16	18		
134	Claude Ballot-Léna		DNQ			27												31															
135	Darrell Basham											24																					
136	Earl Brooks						27																										
137	Melvin Revis																						28										
138	Jimmy Hindman																		30														
139	Al Rudd Jr.																					32											
140	John Haver														33																		
141	Bill Green		DNQ														34																
142	Ferrel Harris		DNQ																					40									
143	Gary Matthews	DNQ																															
144	John Krebs	DNQ																														DNQ	
145	Bobby Ligarski		DNQ																														
146	Woody Fisher		DNQ																														
147	Morgan Shepherd		DNQ																														
148	Ron McGee															DNQ																	
149	Glen Ward															DNQ																	
150	Jan Opperman																					DNQ		Wth									
151	Don Satterfield		Wth																						DNQ								
152	Richard Ulricht		Wth																						DNQ								
153	Junior Miller																										DNQ						
154	Ricky Knotts																											DNQ					
155	Lake Speed																														DNQ	DNQ	
156	Hershel McGriff																															DNQ	
157	Freddy Fryar		Wth																														
158	Gary Myers		Wth																														
159	Joe Frasson		Wth																														
160	Joe Mihalic		Wth																														
161	Bruce Jacobi		Wth																														
162	Joe Ruttman															QL																	
Pos.	Driver	RIV	DAY	CAR	RCH	ATL	NWS	BRI	DAR	MAR	TAL	NSV	DOV	CLT	TWS	RIV	MCH	DAY	NSV	POC	TAL	MCH	BRI	DAR	RCH	DOV	MAR	CLT	NWS	CAR	ATL	ONT	Pts

== See also ==
- 1979 NASCAR Winston West Series
