= Joe Millikan =

American racing driver (born 1950)

Joseph "Joe" Millikan
- Born: April 30, 1950 (age 76); Randleman, North Carolina, U.S.

NASCAR Cup Series career
- 79 races run over 8 years
- Best finish: 6th (1979)
- First race: 1974 American 500 (Rockingham)
- Last race: 1986 Nationwise 500 (Rockingham)
Wins	Top tens	Poles
0	38	1

NASCAR O'Reilly Auto Parts Series career
- 5 races run over 1 year
- Best finish: 45th (1988)
- First race: 1988 Poole Equipment 150 (Orange County)
- Last race: 1988 Winston Classic (Martinsville)
Wins	Top tens	Poles
0	1	0

Joseph Milikan (born April 30, 1950 in Randleman, North Carolina) is an American former NASCAR Winston Cup Series driver who competed from the 1979 season to 1986.

== Career ==
The majority of Millikan's races were done in Chevrolet vehicles (either Chevrolet Monte Carlo, Chevrolet Laguna, or Chevrolet Impala). However, other races in Milikan's career were done in Pontiac (Pontiac Grand Prix) and Oldsmobile (Oldsmobile Cutlass) vehicles but rarely in Ford (Ford Thunderbird) vehicles. His highest amount of winnings earned was at the 1979 NASCAR Winston Cup Series with $199,460 ($884,812.24 adjusted for inflation).

== Motorsports results ==
=== NASCAR ===
(key) (Bold – Pole position awarded by qualifying time. Italics – Pole position earned by points standings or practice time. * – Most laps led.)

==== Winston Cup Series ====
NASCAR Winston Cup Series results
Year	Team	No.	Make	1	2	3	4	5	6	7	8	9	10	11	12	13	14	15	16	17	18	19	20	21	22	23	24	25	26	27	28	29	30	31	NWCC	Pts	Ref
1974	Arrington Racing	67	Plymouth	RSD	DAY	RCH	CAR	BRI	ATL	DAR	NWS	MAR	TAL	NSV	DOV	CLT	RSD	MCH	DAY	BRI	NSV	ATL	POC	TAL	MCH	DAR	RCH	DOV	NWS	MAR	CLT	CAR; 17	ONT		N/A	0	
1979	DeWitt Racing	72	Chevy	RSD; 6		CAR; 2	RCH; 6		NWS; 10	BRI; 8	DAR; 10	MAR; 5		**NSV**; 23	DOV; 8	CLT; 27	TWS; 8	RSD; 10	MCH; 30		NSV; 21	POC; 6		MCH; 6		DAR; 15	RCH; 10	DOV; 5	MAR; 3	CLT; 29	NWS; 15	CAR; 18	ATL; 9	ONT; 12	6th	4014	
1979	DeWitt Racing	72	Olds		DAY; 36			ATL; 8					TAL; 5							DAY; 8			TAL; 25		BRI; 6										6th	4014	
1980	DeWitt Racing	72	Chevy	RSD; 4		RCH; 27		ATL; 37	BRI; 6	DAR; 7	NWS; 10	MAR; 5	TAL	NSV	DOV	CLT	TWS	RSD	MCH	DAY	NSV	POC	TAL	MCH	BRI	DAR	RCH	DOV	NWS	MAR	CLT				33rd	1274	
1980	DeWitt Racing	72	Olds		DAY; 34		CAR; 28																												33rd	1274	
1980	RahMoc Enterprises	75	Chevy																													CAR; 24	ATL; 23	ONT; 7	33rd	1274	
1981	RahMoc Enterprises	75	Chevy	RSD; 13						NWS; 26						CLT; 8	TWS	RSD	MCH; 31	DAY	NSV	POC	TAL												20th	2686	
1981	RahMoc Enterprises	75	Buick		DAY; 9	RCH; 9	CAR; 7	ATL; 15	BRI; 17		DAR; 10	MAR; 29																							20th	2686	
1981	RahMoc Enterprises	75	Olds										TAL; 38	NSV	DOV																				20th	2686	
1981	Cliff Stewart Racing	5	Pontiac																					MCH; 23	BRI; 17	DAR; 18	RCH; 8	DOV; 21	MAR; 5	NWS; 3	CLT; 35	CAR; 19	ATL; 10	RSD; 5	20th	2686	
1982	Cliff Stewart Racing	50	Pontiac	DAY; 40	RCH; 6	BRI; 13	ATL; 24	CAR; 6	DAR; 16	NWS	MAR	TAL	NSV	DOV	CLT	POC	RSD	MCH	DAY	NSV	POC	TAL	MCH	BRI	DAR	RCH	DOV	NWS	CLT	MAR					35th	678	
1982	Billy Matthews	41	Olds																												CAR; 26	ATL	RSD		35th	678	
1983	Leon Satterfield	18	Buick	DAY; DNQ	RCH	CAR	ATL	DAR																											110th	109	
1983	Wayne Beahr	35	Ford						NWS; 18	MAR	TAL	NSV	DOV	BRI	CLT	RSD	POC	MCH	DAY	NSV	POC	TAL	MCH	BRI	DAR	RCH	DOV	MAR	NWS	CLT	CAR	ATL	RSD		110th	109	
1984	Langley Racing	64	Ford	DAY	RCH	CAR	ATL	BRI	NWS	DAR	MAR	TAL	NSV	DOV	CLT	RSD	POC	MCH	DAY	NSV	POC	TAL	MCH	BRI	DAR	RCH	DOV	MAR	CLT	NWS	CAR; 17				75th	112	
1984	Wayne Beahr	35	Ford																													ATL; DNQ			75th	112	
1984	Hagan Racing	1	Chevy																														RSD; 38		75th	112	
1986	Wayne Beahr	35	Ford	DAY	RCH	CAR	ATL	BRI	DAR	NWS	MAR	TAL	DOV	CLT	RSD	POC	MCH	DAY	POC	TAL	GLN	MCH	BRI	DAR	RCH	DOV	MAR	NWS; 30	CLT	CAR; 38	ATL	RSD			88th	122	
1987	info not available	N/A	N/A	DAY	CAR	RCH	ATL	DAR; DNQ	NWS	BRI	MAR	TAL	CLT	DOV	POC	RSD	MCH	DAY	POC	TAL	GLN	MCH	BRI	DAR	RCH	DOV	MAR	NWS	CLT	CAR	RSD	ATL			90th	76	

===== Daytona 500 =====
Year	Team	Manufacturer	Start	Finish
1979	DeWitt Racing	Olds	32	36
1980	DeWitt Racing	Olds	8	34
1981	RahMoc Enterprises	Buick	34	9
1982	Cliff Stewart Racing	Pontiac	27	40
1983	Leon Satterfield	Buick	DNQ	

==== Busch Series ====
NASCAR Busch Series results
Year	Team	No.	Make	1	2	3	4	5	6	7	8	9	10	11	12	13	14	15	16	17	18	19	20	21	22	23	24	25	26	27	28	29	30	NXSC	Pts	Ref
1988	Howard Thomas	00	Olds	DAY	HCY	CAR	MAR	DAR	BRI	LNG	NZH	SBO	NSV	CLT	DOV	ROU	LAN	LVL	MYB	OXF	SBO	HCY	LNG	IRP	ROU; 20	BRI	DAR	RCH	DOV					45th	455	
1988	Howard Thomas	0	Olds																											MAR; 8	CLT; 44	CAR; 37	MAR; 12	45th	455	
