= Dave Watson (racing driver) =

American racing driver (born 1945)

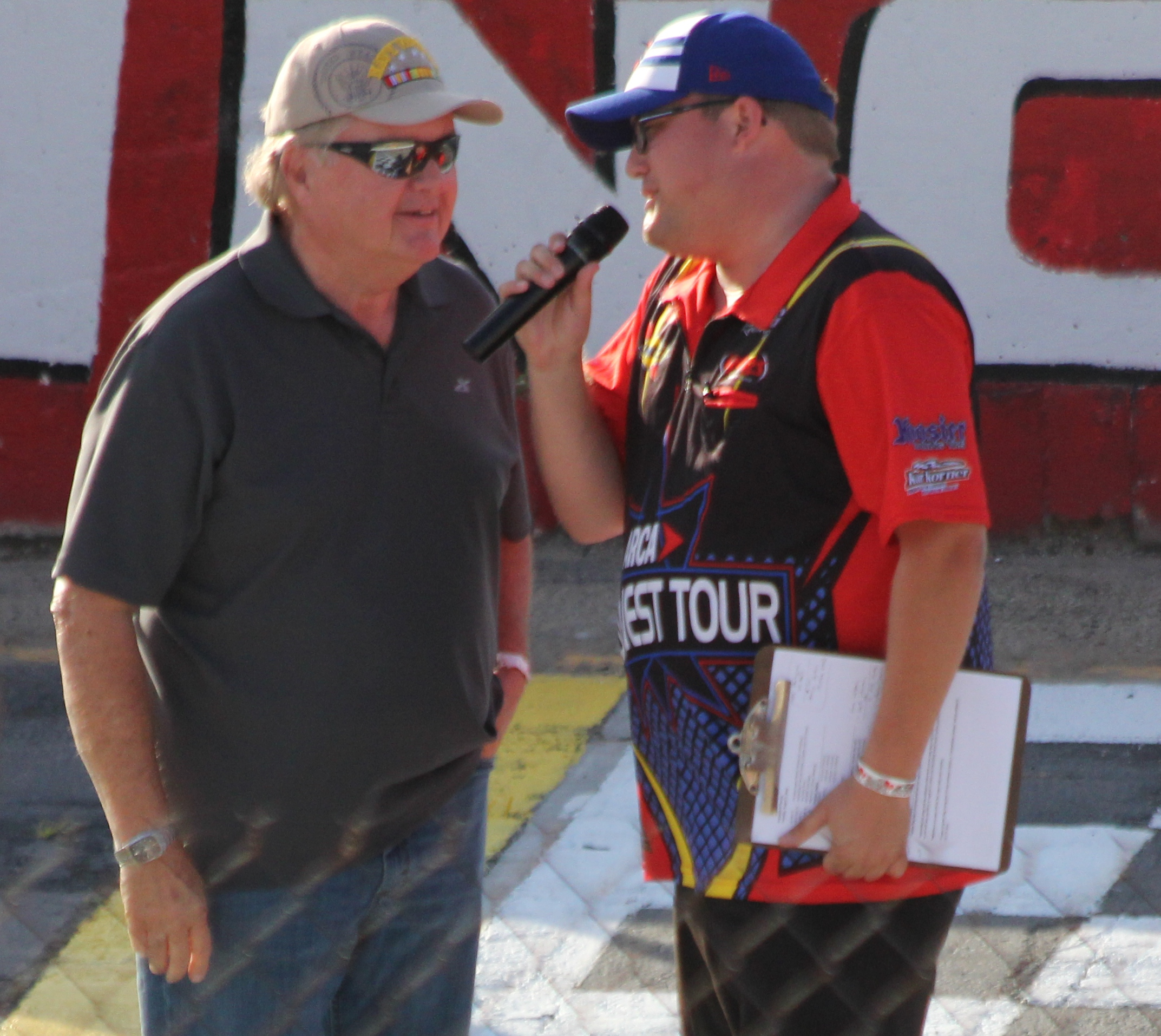
- Watson (left) being interviewed at Wisconsin International Raceway in 2015
- Born: November 7, 1945 (age 81); Milton, Wisconsin, U.S.
- Achievements: 1977 American Speed Association champion 1978 Oktoberfest winner
- Awards: 1977 USAC Stock Car Rookie of the Year; 1977 American Speed Association Rookie of the Year

NASCAR Cup Series career
- 5 races run over 2 years
- 1979 position: 44th
- Best finish: 44th (1979)
- First race: 1978 Dixie 500 (Atlanta)
- Last race: 1979 Atlanta 500 (Atlanta)
Wins	Top tens	Poles
0	1	0
- Statistics up to date as of May 20, 2021.

Dave Watson (born November 7, 1945) is an American racing driver from Milton, Wisconsin. Watson was the 1977 USAC Stock Car Rookie of the Year. He raced five NASCAR Winston Cup (now Sprint Cup Series) races with one top-ten finish. Watson won in the Sports Car Club of America (SCCA), Grand American and IMSA.

== Racing career ==
=== Local track racing ===
Watson began racing on the race tracks in the Wisconsin area. Watson won the 1973 track championship at Rockford Speedway, Slinger Super Speedway track championship in 1975, the 1976 Madison International Speedway track championship with his Super Late Model, and the Lake Geneva Raceway track championship in 1976. He won two Red, White, and Blue state championship series at Wisconsin International Raceway. In 76 events entered during 1976, Watson won 41 short track races which was the second most in the United States that year behind Larry Schuler with 43 wins. Watson won the Oktoberfest main event at the La Crosse Fairgrounds Speedway in 1978.

=== ASA / USAC racing ===
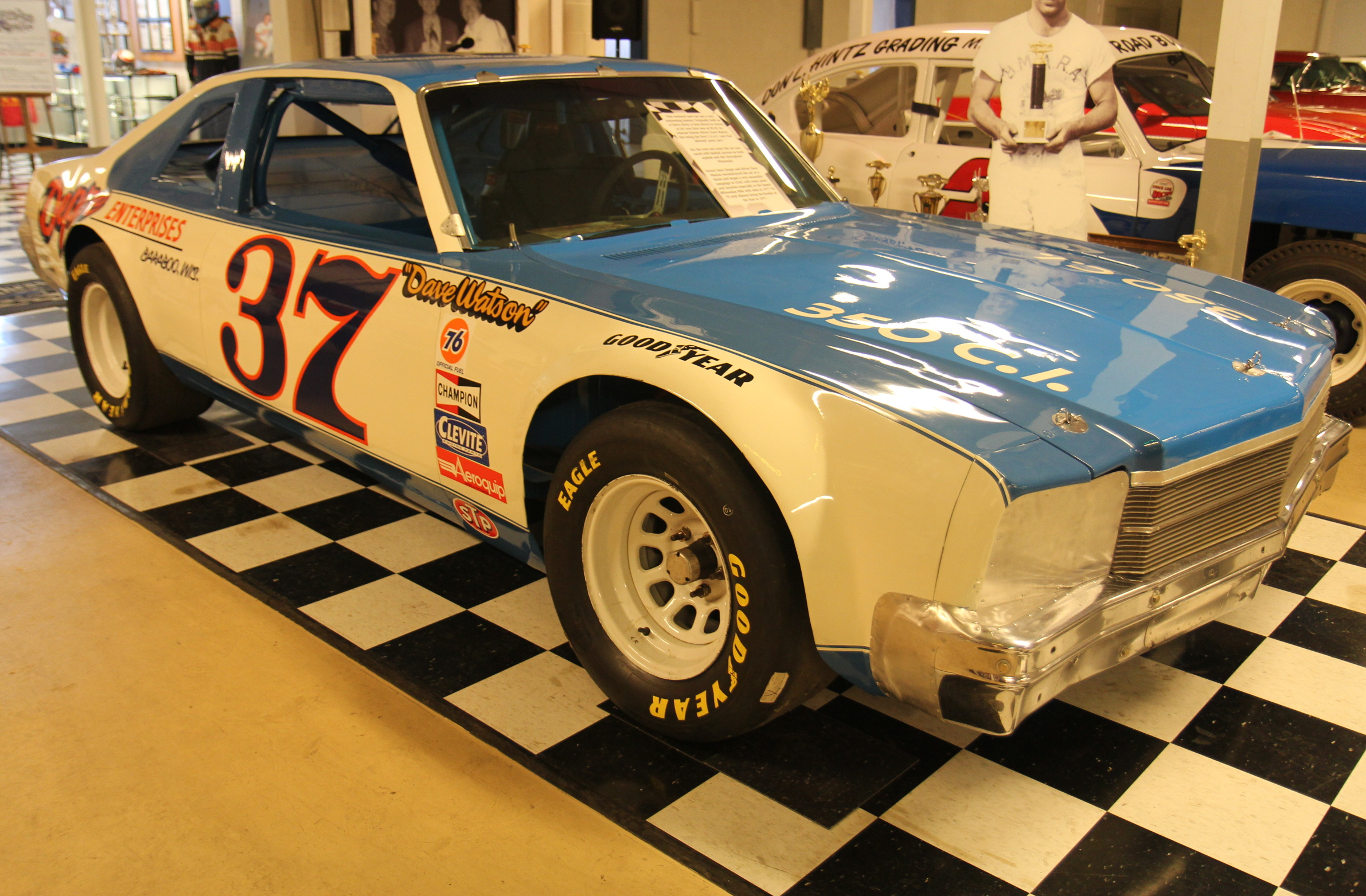
Watson's 1977 USAC Stock Car Rookie of the Year car

Watson began racing on two national tours in 1977 - the American Speed Association (ASA) and USAC Stock Car. Watson was the first USAC Stock Car driver to win in his first career start at the 1977 Milwaukee Mile event. He took the USAC Stock Car Rookie of the Year award. He won the 1977 ASA Championship and took the Rookie of the Year.

=== NASCAR racing ===
Watson made his first NASCAR Winston Cup start at Atlanta International Raceway (now Atlanta Motor Speedway) in late 1978. Watson started 22nd of 39 cars; he completed 316 of 328 laps before a crash ended his race with a 17th-place finish in his own car. Watson attempted to qualify for the following race at Ontario Motor Speedway for Phil Howard but did not make the field.

Watson led one lap in the 1979 Daytona 500 and he finished 26th after his clutch failed. At the following race at Rockingham Speedway, he started 15th and he finished eighth in his only career top-ten finish. He started 17th and finished 18th at Richmond on the following week. At his fourth consecutive race at Atlanta, he started 18th and led six laps. Watson went in for a pit stop on lap 123. The car had a part failure causing Watson to loss control of his car and struck his a crew member Dennis Wade while moving 50 miles per hour (80 km/h). Watson quit the race and went to the hospital but Wade was pronounced dead at the hospital. Watson has not raced in NASCAR since.

=== Sports car racing ===
Watson won the 1983 Most Improved Driver Award for the SCCA Trans Am series.

=== Legacy ===
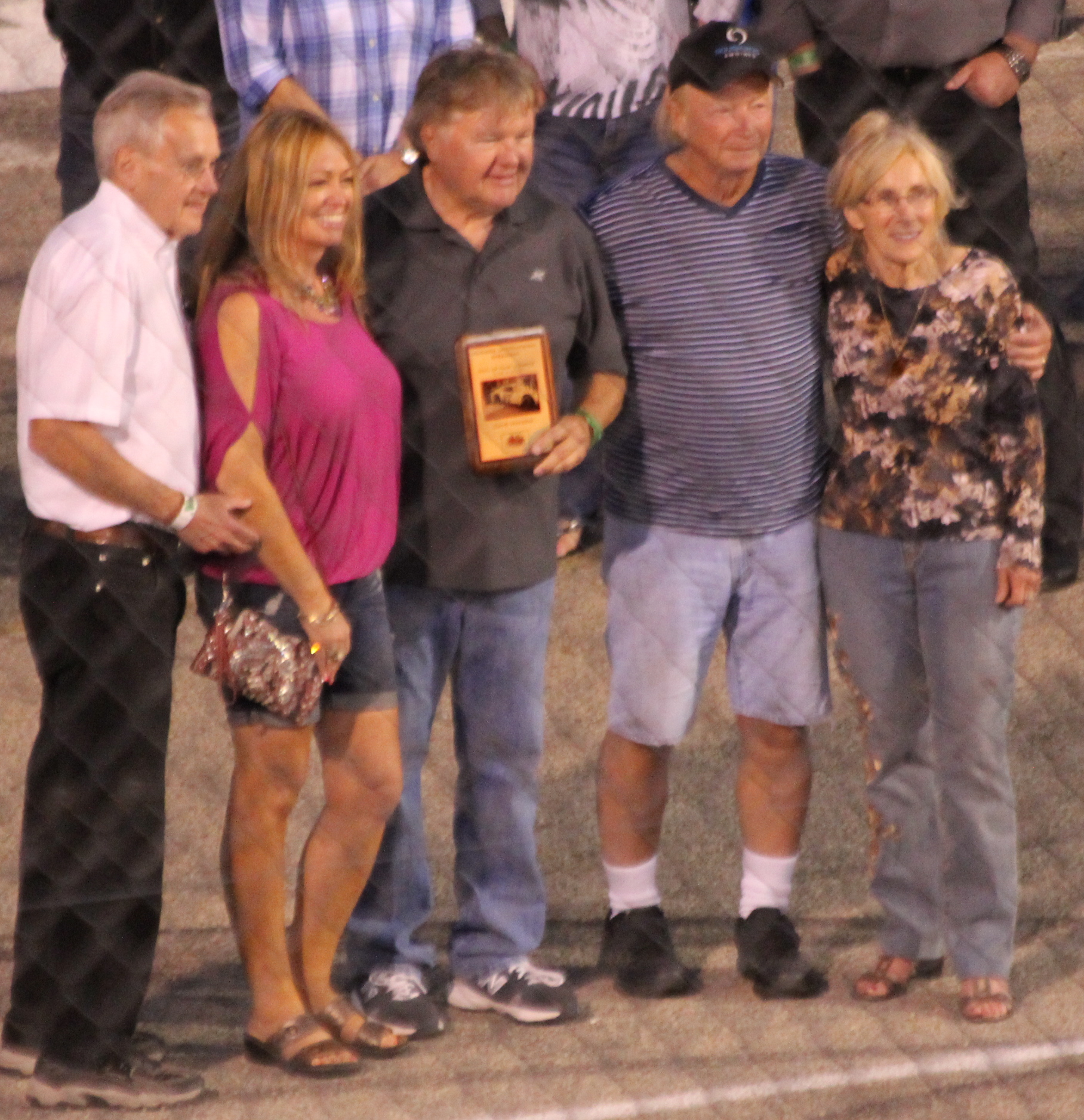
Watson (center) being inducted in the Madison International Speedway Hall of Fame, 2015.

The Southeastern Wisconsin Short Track Hall of Fame inducted Watson in 2015. Watson was inducted in the Hall of Fame for Madison international Speedway in 2015 in its second class. In 2020, he was inducted into the Circle of Fame at Wisconsin International Raceway. [Marty Nussbaum, owner/curator of the COF]

== Life after racing ==
After his racing career ended, Watson was the crew chief and team manager for several teams. Watson starting working as the Competition Direct for the Grand American Road Racing Association when it formed in 1999. He took over as the Director of Special Projects in 2002.
