= Lennie Pond =

American racing driver (1940–2016)

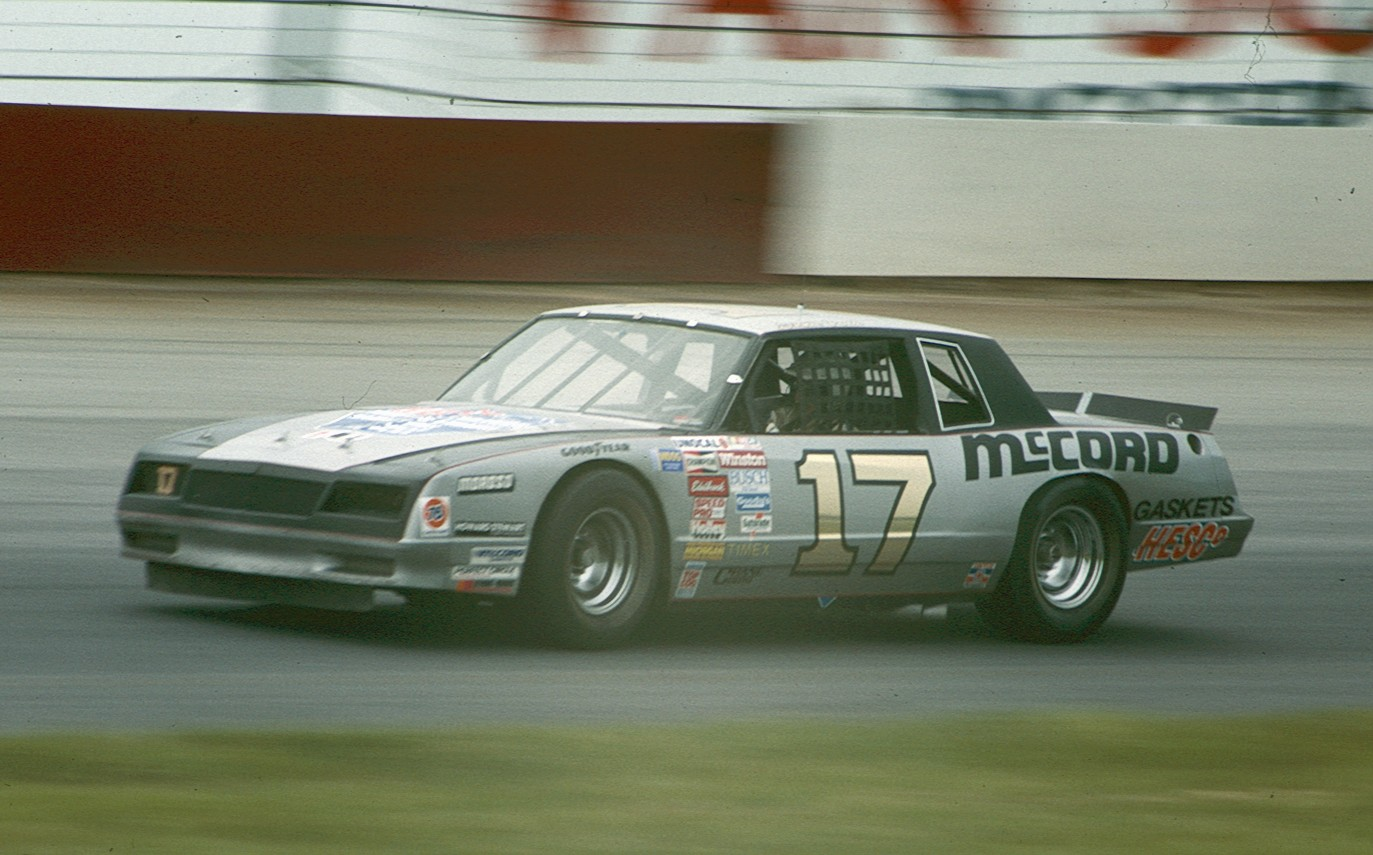
- 1985 racecar
- Born: Lennie Wayne Pond; August 11, 1940; Ettrick, Virginia, U.S.
- Died: February 10, 2016 (aged 75); Richmond, Virginia, U.S.
- Cause of death: Cancer
- Awards: 1973 NASCAR Winston Cup Series Rookie of the Year

NASCAR Cup Series career
- 234 races run over 17 years
- Best finish: 5th (1976)
- First race: 1969 American 500 (Rockingham)
- Last race: 1989 Miller High Life 400 (Richmond)
- First win: 1978 Talladega 500 (Talladega)
| Wins | Top tens | Poles |
|---|---|---|
| 1 | 88 | 5 |

Lennie Wayne Pond (August 11, 1940 – February 10, 2016) was an American NASCAR driver. He won NASCAR Winston Cup Rookie of the Year honors in 1973, and won his only race at Talladega Superspeedway in 1978 for Ronnie Elder and Harry Ranier. Pond set a then world record speed of 174.700 miles per hour (281.152 km/h) in winning the 500-mile race.

== Career ==
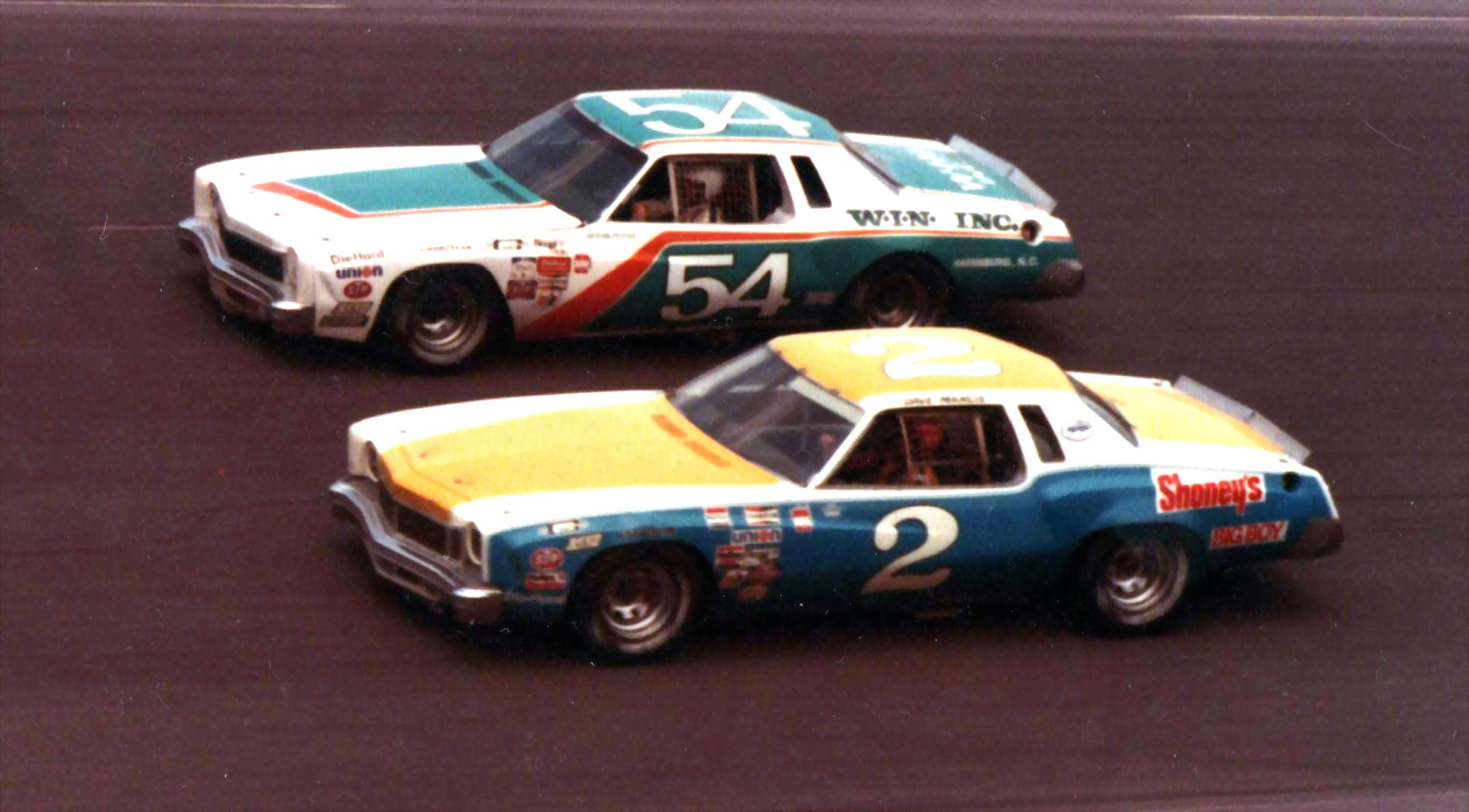
Pond in the No. 54 racing against Dave Marcis in 1978

Lennie W. Pond grew up in the Village of Ettrick, Virginia, racing on his parents' farm, which Ettrick was home to Pond all his life. In the mid-1950s. Pond started racing modifieds on dirt tracks, then went to asphalt tracks, then to late-model tracks. In 1973, Pond started to run Winston Cup races; his last race with Winston Cup was in 1989 at Richmond International Raceway for Junie Donlavey. Pond got to run all three tracks here—dirt, asphalt and the new track.

Pond's career totals include 234 career starts, one win, 39 top-fives, 88 top-tens, five poles, and a best championship finish of fifth in 1976. He beat out Darrell Waltrip for rookie of the year honors in 1973. Five years later, Pond won his first career race at Talladega Superspeedway. Before retiring Pond raced his last race on September 10, 1989, at Richmond International Raceway in the Miller High Life 400 where he finished in eleventh place.

Pond later became a car salesman at Heritage Chevrolet in Chester, Virginia.

Pond died February 10, 2016, from complications of cancer.

== Motorsports career results ==
=== NASCAR ===
(key) (Bold – Pole position awarded by qualifying time. Italics – Pole position earned by points standings or practice time. * – Most laps led.)

==== Grand National Series ====
NASCAR Grand National Series results
| Year | Team | No. | Make | 1 | 2 | 3 | 4 | 5 | 6 | 7 | 8 | 9 | 10 | 11 | 12 | 13 | 14 | 15 | 16 | 17 | 18 | 19 | 20 | 21 | 22 | 23 | 24 | 25 | 26 | 27 | 28 | 29 | 30 | 31 | 32 | 33 | 34 | 35 | 36 | 37 | 38 | 39 | 40 | 41 | 42 | 43 | 44 | 45 | 46 | 47 | 48 | 49 | 50 | 51 | 52 | 53 | 54 | NGNC | Pts | Ref |
|---|---|---|---|---|---|---|---|---|---|---|---|---|---|---|---|---|---|---|---|---|---|---|---|---|---|---|---|---|---|---|---|---|---|---|---|---|---|---|---|---|---|---|---|---|---|---|---|---|---|---|---|---|---|---|---|---|---|---|---|---|
| 1969 | Giachetti Brothers | 44 | Chevy | MGR | MGY | RSD | DAY | DAY | DAY | CAR | AUG | BRI | ATL | CLB | HCY | GPS | RCH | NWS | MAR | AWS | DAR | BLV | LGY | CLT | MGR | SMR | MCH | KPT | GPS | NCF | DAY | DOV | TPN | TRN | BLV | BRI | NSV | SMR | ATL | MCH | SBO | BGS | AWS | DAR | HCY | RCH | TAL | CLB | MAR | NWS | CLT | SVH | AUG | CAR; 34 | JFC | MGR | TWS | 83rd | 51 | |
| 1970 | Joe Phipps | 65 | Chevy | RSD | DAY | DAY | DAY | RCH | CAR | SVH | ATL; 34 | BRI | TAL | NWS | CLB | DAR | BLV | LGY | CLT | SMR | MAR | MCH | RSD | HCY | KPT | GPS | DAY | AST | TPN | TRN | BRI | SMR | NSV | ATL | CLB | ONA | MCH | TAL | BGS | SBO | DAR | HCY | RCH | DOV | NCF | NWS | CLT | MAR | MGR | CAR | LGY | | | | | | | NA | 0 | |

==== Winston Cup Series ====
NASCAR Winston Cup Series results
| Year | Team | No. | Make | 1 | 2 | 3 | 4 | 5 | 6 | 7 | 8 | 9 | 10 | 11 | 12 | 13 | 14 | 15 | 16 | 17 | 18 | 19 | 20 | 21 | 22 | 23 | 24 | 25 | 26 | 27 | 28 | 29 | 30 | 31 | NWCC | Pts | Ref |
|---|---|---|---|---|---|---|---|---|---|---|---|---|---|---|---|---|---|---|---|---|---|---|---|---|---|---|---|---|---|---|---|---|---|---|---|---|---|
| 1973 | Elder-Ranier | 54 | Chevy | RSD | DAY; DNQ | RCH; 7 | CAR; 20 | BRI; 6 | ATL | NWS; 7 | DAR; 36 | MAR; 19 | TAL; 46 | NSV | CLT; 38 | DOV; 20 | TWS; 24 | RSD | MCH; 37 | DAY; 20 | BRI; 4 | ATL; 6 | TAL; 47 | NSV; 23 | DAR; 37 | RCH; 28 | DOV; 9 | NWS; 6 | MAR; 30 | CLT; 6 | CAR; 9 | | | | 23rd | 4013.85 | |
| 1974 | Elder-Ranier | 54 | Chevy | RSD | DAY; 23 | RCH; 4 | CAR; 9 | BRI; 26 | ATL; 10 | DAR; 21 | NWS; 5 | MAR; 5 | TAL; 5 | NSV; 11 | DOV; 6 | CLT; 20 | RSD | MCH; 26 | DAY; 7 | BRI | NSV | ATL; 5 | POC; 30 | TAL | MCH | DAR; 13 | RCH; 10 | DOV; 32 | NWS | MAR; 12 | CLT; 6 | CAR; 11 | ONT | | 18th | 723.25 | |
| 1975 | Elder-Ranier | 54 | Chevy | RSD | DAY; 19 | RCH; 2 | CAR; 23 | BRI | ATL; 10 | NWS; 5 | DAR; 27 | MAR; 25 | TAL; 26 | NSV | DOV; 33 | CLT; 36 | RSD | MCH | DAY; 38 | NSV | POC | TAL; 32 | MCH | DAR; 21 | DOV; 20 | NWS; 5 | MAR; 24 | CLT; 22 | RCH; 2* | CAR; 4 | BRI; 2 | ATL; 6 | ONT; 6 | | 21st | 2540 | |
| 1976 | Elder-Ranier | 54 | Chevy | RSD; 6 | DAY; 4 | CAR; 30 | RCH; 23 | BRI; 22 | ATL; 4 | NWS; 6 | DAR; 4 | MAR; 22 | TAL; 11 | NSV; 6 | DOV; 8 | CLT; 8 | RSD; 25 | MCH; 7 | DAY; 32 | NSV; 4 | POC; 5 | TAL; 5 | MCH; 25 | BRI; 8 | DAR; 5 | RCH; 6 | DOV; 34 | MAR; 29 | NWS; 5 | CLT; 7 | CAR; 2 | ATL; 24 | ONT; 2 | | 5th | 3930 | |
| 1977 | Elder-Ranier | 54 | Chevy | RSD | DAY | RCH | CAR; 34 | ATL; 9 | NWS | DAR; 31 | BRI | MAR; 4 | TAL | NSV | DOV; 7 | CLT; 4 | RSD | MCH | DAY; 33 | NSV | POC | TAL; 5 | MCH | BRI | DAR; 28 | RCH; 5 | DOV; 30 | MAR; 25 | NWS | CLT; 30 | CAR; 36 | ATL | ONT | | 30th | 1193 | |
| 1978 | Ranier Racing | 54 | Chevy | RSD; DNQ | | RCH; 2* | CAR; 5 | ATL; 5 | BRI; 5 | | NWS; 4 | **MAR**; 18 | TAL; 21 | DOV; 3 | | **NSV**; 2 | RSD; 7 | | DAY; 5 | **NSV**; 26 | POC | | | | DAR; 26 | RCH; 12 | | **MAR**; 5 | NWS; 7 | CLT; 6 | CAR; 7 | ATL; 39 | ONT; 6 | | 7th | 3794 | |
| 1978 | Ranier Racing | 54 | Olds | | DAY; 10 | | | | | DAR; 3 | | | | | CLT; 33 | | | MCH; 25 | | | | TAL; 1 | MCH; 8 | **BRI**; 26 | | | DOV; 7 | | | | | | | | 7th | 3794 | |
| 1979 | Al Rudd Auto | 54 | Chevy | RSD | DAY; 30 | CAR | RCH; 14 | ATL | NWS | BRI | | | | | | | | | | | | | | | | | | | | | | | | | 29th | 1415 | |
| 1979 | Gray Racing | 19 | Chevy | | | | | | | | DAR; 11 | | | | | | | | | | | | | MCH; 31 | BRI | DAR; 25 | RCH; 25 | DOV; 23 | MAR | CLT | NWS | CAR | ATL | ONT | 29th | 1415 | |
| 1979 | Kennie Childers Racing | 12 | Chevy | | | | | | | | | MAR; 29 | | | DOV; 9 | CLT; 9 | TWS; 31 | RSD | MCH; 11 | | | | | | | | | | | | | | | | 29th | 1415 | |
| 1979 | Kennie Childers Racing | 12 | Olds | | | | | | | | | | TAL; 38 | NSV | | | | | | DAY; 28 | NSV | POC; 34 | TAL | | | | | | | | | | | | 29th | 1415 | |
| 1980 | RahMoc Enterprises | 75 | Buick | RSD | DAY; 9 | RCH | CAR | | | | | | | | | | | | | | | | | | | | | | | | | | | | 30th | 1558 | |
| 1980 | RahMoc Enterprises | 75 | Chevy | | | | | ATL; 23 | BRI | | | | | | | | | | | | | | | | | | | | | | | | | | 30th | 1558 | |
| 1980 | Testa Racing | 68 | Chevy | | | | | | | DAR; 6 | NWS | MAR | | | | | | | | | | | | | | DAR; 40 | RCH; 3 | DOV; 8 | NWS; 28 | MAR; 28 | CLT; 34 | CAR; 29 | ATL; 7 | ONT; 29 | 30th | 1558 | |
| 1980 | Testa Racing | 68 | Olds | | | | | | | | | | TAL; 4 | NSV | DOV | | | | | | | | TAL; 28 | MCH | BRI; 8 | | | | | | | | | | 30th | 1558 | |
| 1980 | Kennie Childers Racing | 12 | Chevy | | | | | | | | | | | | | CLT; 41 | TWS | RSD | MCH | | | | | | | | | | | | | | | | 30th | 1558 | |
| 1980 | Ulrich Racing | 40 | Buick | | | | | | | | | | | | | | | | | DAY; 11 | NSV | POC | | | | | | | | | | | | | 30th | 1558 | |
| 1981 | Testa Racing | 68 | Buick | RSD | DAY; 27 | RCH; 11 | CAR | ATL | BRI | NWS | DAR | MAR | TAL | NSV | DOV | | | | | | | | | | | | | | | | | | | | 34th | 1100 | |
| 1981 | Gordon Racing | 24 | Buick | | | | | | | | | | | | | CLT; 11 | TWS | RSD | MCH | | | | | | | | | | | | | | | | 34th | 1100 | |
| 1981 | Lennie Pond | 68 | Buick | | | | | | | | | | | | | | | | | DAY; 11 | NSV | POC | TAL; 24 | MCH | BRI; 14 | DAR; 17 | RCH; 27 | DOV; 16 | MAR; 25 | NWS; 23 | CLT | CAR; 36 | ATL | RSD | 34th | 1100 | |
| 1982 | Gordon Racing | 24 | Buick | DAY | RCH; 24 | BRI | ATL | CAR | DAR; 10 | NWS; 26 | MAR; 22 | TAL; 31 | NSV | DOV | CLT; 31 | POC | RSD | MCH | DAY; 16 | NSV; 27 | POC | TAL; 36 | MCH | BRI | DAR; 40 | RCH | DOV | NWS | | | | | | | 33rd | 756 | |
| 1982 | Hylton Motorsports | 48 | Chevy | | | | | | | | | | | | | | | | | | | | | | | | | | CLT; 20 | MAR | CAR; 9 | ATL; 12 | RSD | | 33rd | 756 | |
| 1983 | Tom Beck | 51 | Buick | DAY; 12 | RCH | | | | | | | | | | | | | | DAY; 10 | NSV | POC | TAL | | | | RCH; 28 | DOV | MAR | NWS | CLT | | | | | 34th | 887 | |
| 1983 | Hylton Motorsports | 48 | Pontiac | | | CAR; 31 | ATL | DAR | | | | | | | | | | | | | | | | | | | | | | | | | | | 34th | 887 | |
| 1983 | Hylton Motorsports | 48 | Buick | | | | | | NWS; 12 | | | | | | | | | | | | | | | | | | | | | | | | | | 34th | 887 | |
| 1983 | Hylton Motorsports | 48 | Chevy | | | | | | | MAR; 14 | TAL; 19 | NSV | DOV | BRI | CLT | RSD | POC | MCH | | | | | | | | | | | | | | | | | 34th | 887 | |
| 1983 | Jimmy Means Racing | 52 | Chevy | | | | | | | | | | | | | | | | | | | | MCH; 22 | BRI | | | | | | | | | | | 34th | 887 | |
| 1983 | Billy Matthews Racing | 42 | Buick | | | | | | | | | | | | | | | | | | | | | | DAR; 39 | | | | | | CAR; 8 | ATL | RSD | | 34th | 887 | |
| 1984 | Morgan-McClure Motorsports | 4 | Chevy | DAY; 13 | RCH; 20 | CAR; 25 | ATL; 39 | BRI | NWS | | | | | | | | | | | | | | | | | | | | | | | | | | 38th | 923 | |
| 1984 | Testa Racing | 78 | Buick | | | | | | | DAR; 38 | MAR | TAL | NSV | DOV | CLT | RSD | POC | MCH | DAY | NSV | POC | TAL | MCH | BRI | DAR | | | | | | | | | | 38th | 923 | |
| 1984 | Marcis Auto Racing | 71 | Olds | | | | | | | | | | | | | | | | | | | | | | | RCH; 17 | DOV; 12 | MAR; 9 | CLT; 25 | NWS; 12 | CAR; 10 | ATL; 37 | RSD | | 38th | 923 | |
| 1985 | Hylton Motorsports | 48 | Chevy | DAY; 19 | RCH; 13 | CAR; 14 | ATL; 31 | BRI | DAR | NWS | MAR | TAL | DOV | | | | | | | | | | | | | | | | | | | | | | 33rd | 1107 | |
| 1985 | Hamby Motorsports | 17 | Chevy | | | | | | | | | | | CLT; 30 | RSD | POC; 17 | MCH; 18 | DAY; 19 | POC; 13 | TAL; 19 | MCH | BRI | DAR | | | | | CLT; 39 | CAR | ATL | RSD | | | | 33rd | 1107 | |
| 1985 | Hylton Motorsports | 49 | Chevy | | | | | | | | | | | | | | | | | | | | | RCH; 25 | DOV | MAR | NWS | | | | | | | | 33rd | 1107 | |
| 1988 | Hamby Motorsports | 22 | Chevy | DAY | RCH; 22 | CAR | ATL | DAR | BRI | NWS | MAR | TAL | CLT | DOV | RSD | POC | MCH | DAY | POC | TAL | GLN | MCH | BRI | DAR | | | | | | | | | | | NA | 0 | |
| 1988 | Gray Racing | 54 | Chevy | | | | | | | | | | | | | | | | | | | | | | RCH; DNQ | DOV | MAR | CLT | NWS | CAR | PHO | ATL | | | NA | 0 | |
| 1989 | Donlavey Racing | 90 | Ford | DAY | CAR | ATL | RCH | DAR | BRI | NWS | MAR | TAL | CLT | DOV | SON | POC | MCH | DAY | POC | TAL | GLN | MCH | BRI | DAR | RCH; 11 | DOV | MAR | CLT | NWS | CAR | PHO | ATL | | | 64th | 130 | |

===== Daytona 500 =====
| Year | Team | Manufacturer | Start | Finish |
|---|---|---|---|---|
| 1973 | Elder-Ranier | Chevrolet | DNQ | |
| 1974 | Elder-Ranier | Chevrolet | 21 | 23 |
| 1975 | Elder-Ranier | Chevrolet | 7 | 19 |
| 1976 | Elder-Ranier | Chevrolet | 11 | 4 |
| 1978 | Ranier Racing | Oldsmobile | 28 | 10 |
| 1979 | Al Rudd Auto | Chevrolet | 40 | 30 |
| 1980 | RahMoc Enterprises | Buick | 12 | 9 |
| 1981 | Testa Racing | Buick | 32 | 27 |
| 1983 | Tom Beck | Buick | 39 | 12 |
| 1984 | Morgan-McClure Motorsports | Chevrolet | 24 | 13 |
| 1985 | Hylton Motorsports | Chevrolet | 27 | 19 |
