= D. K. Ulrich =

American racing driver (born 1944)

Donald Keith Ulrich
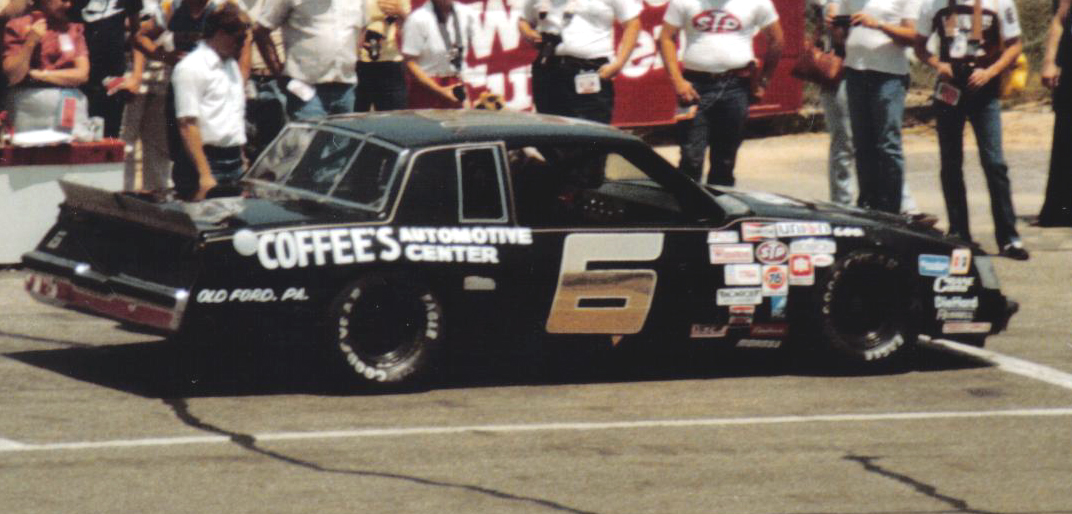
- Born: April 10, 1944 (age 82); Woodbury, New Jersey, U.S.

NASCAR Cup Series career
- 273 races run over 19 years
- Best finish: 12th (1979)
- First race: 1971 Maryville 200 (Maryville)
- Last race: 1992 Budweiser 500 (Dover)
Wins	Top tens	Poles
0	16	0

NASCAR Grand National East Series career
- 14 races run over 2 years
- Best finish: 20th (1973)
- First race: 1972 Mr. D's 200 (Nashville)
- Last race: 1973 Cumberland 200 (Fayetteville)
Wins	Top tens	Poles
0	1	0
- Statistics up to date as of July 26, 2012.

Donald Keith Ulrich (born April 10, 1944) is an American former driver/owner in the NASCAR Winston Cup Series. As a driver, he had sixteen top-ten finishes in 273 starts. His last race came in 1992.

As car owner, Ulrich fielded cars for many years for young drivers such as Mark Martin, Sterling Marlin, Rick Mast, Greg Sacks, Davy Jones, Parnelli Jones III, Morgan Shepherd, Tim Richmond, Ernie Irvan, and Richard Petty after his No. 43 crashed in practice and the team's backup car was not allowed by NASCAR, the Petty team bought Ulrich's No. 6 Chevy and placed STP decals on the previously unsponsored car. Petty would finish 38th after an engine failure. He sold the team to Jasper Motorsports in 1994.

Ulrich has two children, Tammy Ulrich Langdon and Daniel Keith Ulrich, two grandchildren Truett and Patrick Langdon, and is the stepfather of actor Skeet Ulrich and his brother Geoff Trout.

== Motorsports career results ==
=== NASCAR ===
(key) (Bold – Pole position awarded by qualifying time. Italics – Pole position earned by points standings or practice time. * – Most laps led.)

==== Grand National Series ====
NASCAR Grand National Series results
Year	Team	No.	Make	1	2	3	4	5	6	7	8	9	10	11	12	13	14	15	16	17	18	19	20	21	22	23	24	25	26	27	28	29	30	31	32	33	34	35	36	37	38	39	40	41	42	43	44	45	46	47	48	NGNC	Pts	Ref
1971	Ulrich Racing	40	Ford	RSD	DAY	DAY	DAY	ONT; DNQ	RCH	CAR	HCY	BRI	ATL	CLB	GPS								KPT; 16	CLT	DOV; 19	MCH	RSD	HOU	GPS; 26	DAY	BRI; DNQ	AST; 32	ISP; 12	TRN; 22	NSV; 24	ATL	BGS	ONA	MCH	TAL; DNQ	CLB; 23	HCY	DAR	MAR	CLT	DOV	CAR	MGR	RCH; 22	NWS	TWS; 45	53rd	443	
1971	Ulrich Racing	41	Ford													SMR; 29	NWS	MAR	DAR	SBO; 18	TAL	ASH																														53rd	443	

==== Winston Cup Series ====
NASCAR Winston Cup Series results
Year	Team	No.	Make	1	2	3	4	5	6	7	8	9	10	11	12	13	14	15	16	17	18	19	20	21	22	23	24	25	26	27	28	29	30	31	NWCC	Pts	Ref
1972	Ulrich Racing	40	Ford	RSD	DAY	RCH	ONT; DNQ	CAR	ATL	BRI	DAR	NWS	MAR	TAL	CLT	DOV	MCH	RSD; DNQ	TWS; 38	DAY	BRI	TRN; 19	ATL	TAL	MCH	NSV; 11	DAR	RCH	DOV; 14	MAR	NWS	CLT; DNQ	CAR	TWS	64th	749	
1973	Ulrich Racing	40	Ford	RSD	DAY	RCH	CAR	BRI	ATL	NWS	DAR	MAR	TAL; 33	NSV	CLT	DOV; 27	TWS; 31	RSD			BRI; 24	ATL	TAL; 39	NSV	DAR; 18	RCH; 25	DOV; 35	NWS; 23	MAR; 21	CLT	CAR				36th	1543.9	
1973	Ulrich Racing	45	Ford																MCH; 26	DAY															36th	1543.9	
1974	Ulrich Racing	40	Chevy	RSD	DAY; DNQ	RCH; 22	CAR	BRI	ATL	DAR	NWS; 21	MAR	TAL; 26	NSV; 17	DOV; 17	CLT	RSD	MCH; 15	DAY	BRI; 23	NSV; 12	ATL	POC; 17	TAL; 30				DOV; 26	NWS; 14	MAR; 13	CLT	CAR	ONT; 24		32nd	155.32	
1974	Negre Racing	8	Dodge																						MCH; 28	DAR	RCH								32nd	155.32	
1975	Ulrich Racing	40	Chevy	RSD	DAY	RCH	CAR	BRI; 11	ATL	NWS	DAR	MAR	TAL	NSV	DOV; 30	CLT	RSD	MCH; 26	DAY; DNQ	NSV; 20	POC; 15	TAL; 25	MCH; 21	DAR; 16	DOV; 10	NWS; 23	MAR; 28	CLT	RCH; 13	CAR; 31	BRI; 27	ATL; 33	ONT; 13		27th	1453	
1976	J.R. DeLotto	40	Chevy	RSD; 12	DAY; 19	CAR; 17	RCH; 20	BRI; 25	ATL; 21	NWS; 19	DAR; 16	MAR; 16		NSV; 11	DOV; 12		RSD; 26	MCH; 12	DAY; 16	NSV; 17	POC; 38	TAL; 21	MCH; 7	BRI; 11	DAR; 16	RCH; 17	DOV; 8	MAR; 13	NWS; 26	CLT; 30	CAR; 14	ATL; 18	ONT; 25		14th	3280	
1976	Robertson Racing	25	Chevy										TAL; 20																						14th	3280	
1976	Dalton Racing	7	Chevy													CLT; 16																			14th	3280	
1977	J.R. DeLotto	40	Chevy	RSD; 15	DAY; 14	RCH; 28	CAR; 23	ATL; 29	NWS; 20	DAR; 34	BRI; 26	MAR; 15	TAL; 31	NSV; 14	DOV; 20	CLT; 34	RSD; 11	MCH; 16	DAY; 41	NSV; 14	POC; 34	TAL; 18	MCH; 18	BRI; 11	DAR; 27	RCH; 14	DOV; 31	MAR; 12	NWS; 22	CLT; 19	CAR; 33	ATL; 18	ONT; 21		15th	2901	
1978	Ulrich Racing	40	Chevy	RSD; 10	DAY; 17	RCH; 16	CAR; 26	ATL; 11	BRI; 11	DAR; 20	NWS; 13	MAR; 13	TAL; 17	DOV; 16	CLT; 29	NSV; 10	RSD; 14	MCH; 14	DAY; 19	NSV; 20	POC; 25	TAL; 19	MCH; 23	BRI; 9	DAR; 29	RCH	DOV	MAR	NWS	CLT	CAR	ATL			22nd	2452	
1978	Ulrich Racing	40	Buick																														ONT; DNQ		22nd	2452	
1979	Ulrich Racing	40	Buick	RSD; 14	DAY; 13	CAR; 6	RCH; 10	ATL; 14	NWS; 18				TAL; 21				TWS; 15		MCH; 21	DAY; 18			TAL; 27	MCH; 28		DAR; 13				CLT; 9		CAR; 28	ATL; 25		12th	3508	
1979	Ulrich Racing	40	Chevy							BRI; 12	DAR; 12	MAR; 15			DOV; 12	CLT; 18		RSD; 33			NSV; 23	POC; 11			BRI; 12		RCH; 12	DOV; 12	MAR; 10		NWS; 8			ONT; 33	12th	3508	
1979	Gordon Racing	24	Olds											NSV; 16																					12th	3508	
1980	Ulrich Racing	40	Chevy	RSD	DAY	RCH	CAR	ATL	BRI	DAR	NWS; 26	MAR; 28	TAL	NSV			TWS; 15	RSD; 36	MCH	DAY	NSV	POC	TAL	MCH; 15	BRI; 10	DAR; 13	RCH; 25	DOV	NWS; 30	MAR	CLT	CAR	ATL		38th	935	
1980	Hollar Racing	99	Chevy												DOV; 34	CLT																			38th	935	
1980	Ulrich Racing	4	Chevy																															ONT; 37	38th	935	
1981	Price Racing	45	Buick	RSD	DAY	RCH	CAR	ATL	BRI; 19																										32nd	1191	
1981	Ulrich Racing	40	Buick							NWS; 13	DAR; 22	MAR	TAL								NSV; 23	POC	TAL	MCH	BRI										32nd	1191	
1981	Price Racing	40	Buick											NSV; 23																					32nd	1191	
1981	Ulrich Racing	99	Buick												DOV; 4	CLT										DAR; 31	RCH; 21	DOV; 18	MAR	NWS	CLT; 14	CAR; 17	ATL; 27	RSD	32nd	1191	
1981	Ulrich Racing	98	Buick														TWS; 32																		32nd	1191	
1981	Ulrich Racing	64	Olds															RSD; 27																	32nd	1191	
1981	Ulrich Racing	99	Olds																MCH; 20	DAY															32nd	1191	
1982	Ulrich Racing	6	Buick	DAY	RCH; 29	BRI; 26	ATL; 32	CAR; 26	DAR; 15	NWS; 19	MAR; 31	TAL; 15	NSV; 26	DOV; 14	CLT; 28			MCH; 22	DAY	NSV; 17	POC	TAL	MCH		DAR; 27	RCH; 20	DOV; 19	NWS; 15	CLT; 15	MAR; 12	CAR; 10	ATL; 23			24th	2566	
1982	Hylton Motorsports	48	Buick													POC; 15	RSD; 16																RSD; 15		24th	2566	
1982	Ulrich Racing	40	Buick																					BRI; 18											24th	2566	
1983	Reeder Racing	02	Buick	DAY	RCH	CAR; 18	ATL		NWS; DNQ											NSV; 30															24th	2400	
1983	Ulrich Racing	6	Buick					DAR; 10	NWS; 13				DOV; 18	BRI; 13		RSD; 16	POC; 16								DAR; 16	RCH; 10	DOV; 12	MAR; 18	NWS; 20						24th	2400	
1983	Langley Racing	6	Ford							MAR; 13	TAL	NSV																							24th	2400	
1983	Ulrich Racing	6	Chevy												CLT; 23			MCH; 22	DAY											CLT; 20	CAR; 11	ATL; 21			24th	2400	
1983	Reeder Racing	02	Pontiac																		POC; 17	TAL	MCH; 33	BRI											24th	2400	
1983	Langley Racing	64	Ford																														RSD; 26		24th	2400	
1984	U.S. Racing	6	Chevy	DAY	RCH	CAR; 22	ATL	BRI; 24					NSV; 24																						42nd	810	
1984	U.S. Racing	6	Buick						NWS; 19	DAR; 29	MAR	TAL		DOV; 17	CLT	RSD; 18	POC; 37	MCH; 29	DAY	NSV	POC	TAL	MCH	BRI	DAR	RCH	DOV	MAR	CLT	NWS	CAR	ATL	RSD		42nd	810	
1985	U.S. Racing	65	Buick	DAY	RCH	CAR	ATL	BRI	DAR	NWS	MAR	TAL	DOV	CLT	RSD	POC	MCH	DAY	POC	TAL	MCH	BRI	DAR	RCH	DOV	MAR	NWS	CLT	CAR; 32	ATL	RSD				NA	0	
1986	U.S. Racing	6	Chevy	DAY	RCH	CAR	ATL	BRI	DAR	NWS	MAR	TAL	DOV	CLT; QL^{†}	RSD; 33	POC; 17	MCH; 40	DAY	POC; 18	TAL	GLN	MCH; 20	BRI; 20	DAR; 18	RCH; 17	DOV	MAR; 27	NWS; 28	CLT	CAR	ATL	RSD			37th	804	
1987	U.S. Racing	6	Chevy	DAY	CAR; 26	RCH; 30	ATL; 23	DAR; 18	NWS	BRI; 15	MAR	TAL	CLT	DOV; 34	POC; DNQ	RSD	MCH	DAY	POC	TAL	GLN	MCH	BRI	DAR	RCH; 26	DOV	MAR	NWS	CLT	CAR	RSD	ATL			40th	625	
1990	U.S. Racing	2	Pontiac	DAY	RCH	CAR	ATL	DAR	BRI	NWS	MAR	TAL	CLT	DOV	SON	POC	MCH	DAY	POC	TAL	GLN	MCH	BRI	DAR	RCH; 33	DOV	MAR	NWS	CLT	CAR	PHO	ATL			91st	64	
1992	Aroneck Racing	85	Olds	DAY	CAR	RCH	ATL	DAR	BRI	NWS	MAR	TAL	CLT	DOV; 39	SON	POC	MCH	DAY	POC	TAL	GLN	MCH	BRI	DAR	RCH	DOV	MAR	NWS	CLT	CAR	PHO	ATL			90th	46	
^{†} - Qualified but replaced by Richard Petty

===== Daytona 500 =====
Year	Team	Manufacturer	Start	Finish
1974	Ulrich Racing	Chevrolet	DNQ	
1976	J.R. DeLotto	Chevrolet	27	19
1977	J.R. DeLotto	Chevrolet	42	14
1978	Ulrich Racing	Chevrolet	40	17
1979	Ulrich Racing	Buick	35	13

=== ARCA Permatex SuperCar Series ===
(key) (Bold – Pole position awarded by qualifying time. Italics – Pole position earned by points standings or practice time. * – Most laps led.)

ARCA Permatex SuperCar Series results
Year	Team	No.	Make	1	2	3	4	5	6	7	8	9	10	11	12	13	14	15	16	APSC	Pts	Ref
1976	J.R. DeLotto	40	Chevy	SLM	DAY	QCS	FMS	TAL; 23	QCS	AVS	SLM	FRS	TOL	NSV	TOL	SLM				NA	0	
1986	U.S. Racing	6	Chevy	ATL	DAY	ATL	TAL	SIR	SSP	FRS	KIL	CSP	TAL; 25	BLN	ISF	DSF	TOL	MCS	ATL	117th	-	
Results before 1985 may be incomplete.
