= L. G. DeWitt =

Racecar driver from North Carolina

L.G. DeWitt
- Born: March 23, 1912; Ellerbe, North Carolina, U.S.
- Died: October 9, 1990 (aged 78); Pinehurst, North Carolina, U.S.
- Occupation: NASCAR car owner
- Known for: One of the first NASCAR Cup Series owners to become a millionaire

L. G. DeWitt (March 23, 1912 – October 9, 1990) was an American NASCAR Winston Cup Series stock car owner from 1965 to 1980.

== Career summary ==
His ownership career consists of employing the famous names in NASCAR history like John Sears, Henley Gray, Elmo Langley, LeeRoy Yarbrough, Benny Parsons, and Joe Millikan. DeWitt's vehicles competed in 530 races in 16 years with 12 wins, 177 finishes in the "top five", and 315 finishes in the "top ten". Becoming one of the first millionaires in Cup Series history, DeWitt ended his NASCAR ownership career earning a grand total of $1,802,759 ($7,044,302.64 when considering inflation). His vehicles started tenth place on average and finished in 13th on average. Vehicles under DeWitt's employment would end up leading 4,318 laps out of 132,425. Traveling the equivalent of 131,567.8 miles (211,737.8 km) on regular roads, DeWitt would eventually see his drivers become veterans.

Benny Parsons would help DeWitt win a championship in 1973 even with only one win in the entire season. DeWitt eventually had to close up shop at the end of the 1981 NASCAR Winston Cup Series due to lack of funds and skyrocketing expenses related to professional stock car racing. DeWitt died in 1990.
