= Kennie Childers =

Kennie Childers is a former NASCAR Winston Cup Series owner whose career spanned from 1978 to 1981. In addition to being a NASCAR team owner, Childers also owned a collection of coal mines throughout the Southern United States.

== Racing career ==
Various drivers drove for Childers in his 4-year career including: Harry Gant, Neil Bonnett, Jack Ingram, Lennie Pond, Donnie Allison, Buddy Baker, David Pearson, Tim Richmond, and Buck Simmons. Although no wins were created after 59 races, these drivers helped Childers get credit for four finishes in the "top five" and 12 finishes in the "top ten. Childers' drivers would end up leading 498 laps out of 11,451 - the equivalent of 14,511.6 miles (23,354.2 km). The average start of the drivers would be 15th while the average finish would be 23rd.

While his final race as an owner would be at the 1981 Wranger Sanfor-Set 400, Childers' first race as owner would be at the 1978 World 600. Childers would also end his career with his grand total for prize earnings at $130,250 ($461,262.35 when adjusted for inflation).

All of Childers' vehicle used the number 12. It served as a symbolic and/or lucky number for him. While no wins were recorded under his ownership regime, Childers' vehicle led dozens of laps and finished in 10th place at one particular race. The team did score one pole in the NASCAR Winston West Series in the series finale in 1979 at Phoenix International Raceway with driver Buck Simmons, although they used the No. 72 which was the first and only time that they didn’t use the No. 12.
