= Kentucky Motor Speedway (short track) =

Race track

Coordinates: 37.7120°N 86.8985°W

- Location: 8135 Haynes Station Rd., Whitesville, Kentucky
- Operator: Scott Slaton and John Hayden
- Opened: 1960
- Major events: NASCAR Southeast Series (2003)

3/8 mile Oval
- Surface: Paved (Asphalt)
- Length: 3/8 mi (0.60 km)
- Turns: 4
- Banking: High Banked

Figure 8
- Surface: Paved (Asphalt)
- Turns: 4

Kentucky Motor Speedway is a 3/8-mile short track located in Whitesville, Kentucky. The track was built in 1960, as a 1/4-mile track, with an infield figure 8 crossover added in 1981. But the track was later reconfigured to a 3/8-mile short track, while the figure 8 still have races.

Several NASCAR greats, including Darrell Waltrip, Michael Waltrip, Jeremy Mayfield, and the Green brothers Jeff, David, and Mark, got their start in racing at the speedway.

Kentucky Motor Speedway hosted 2 NASCAR Southeast Series races in 2003 in the 3/8-mile short track layout.

The track hosts weekly races of all that divisions: Sportsman Division, super streets, pure stock, mini mods, mini stocks, stock cars and scrappers.

The facility was idle from 2005 to 2008 due to bankruptcy issues before officially reopening on April 19, 2009. Brad Payne ran the race track from 2012 to 2019. Scott Slaton and John Hayden took over KMS operations before the 2020 season. The facility was idled again in 2022 and 2023, with plans to reopen after further improvements.
