= Darrell Waltrip =

American racing driver and commentator (born 1947)

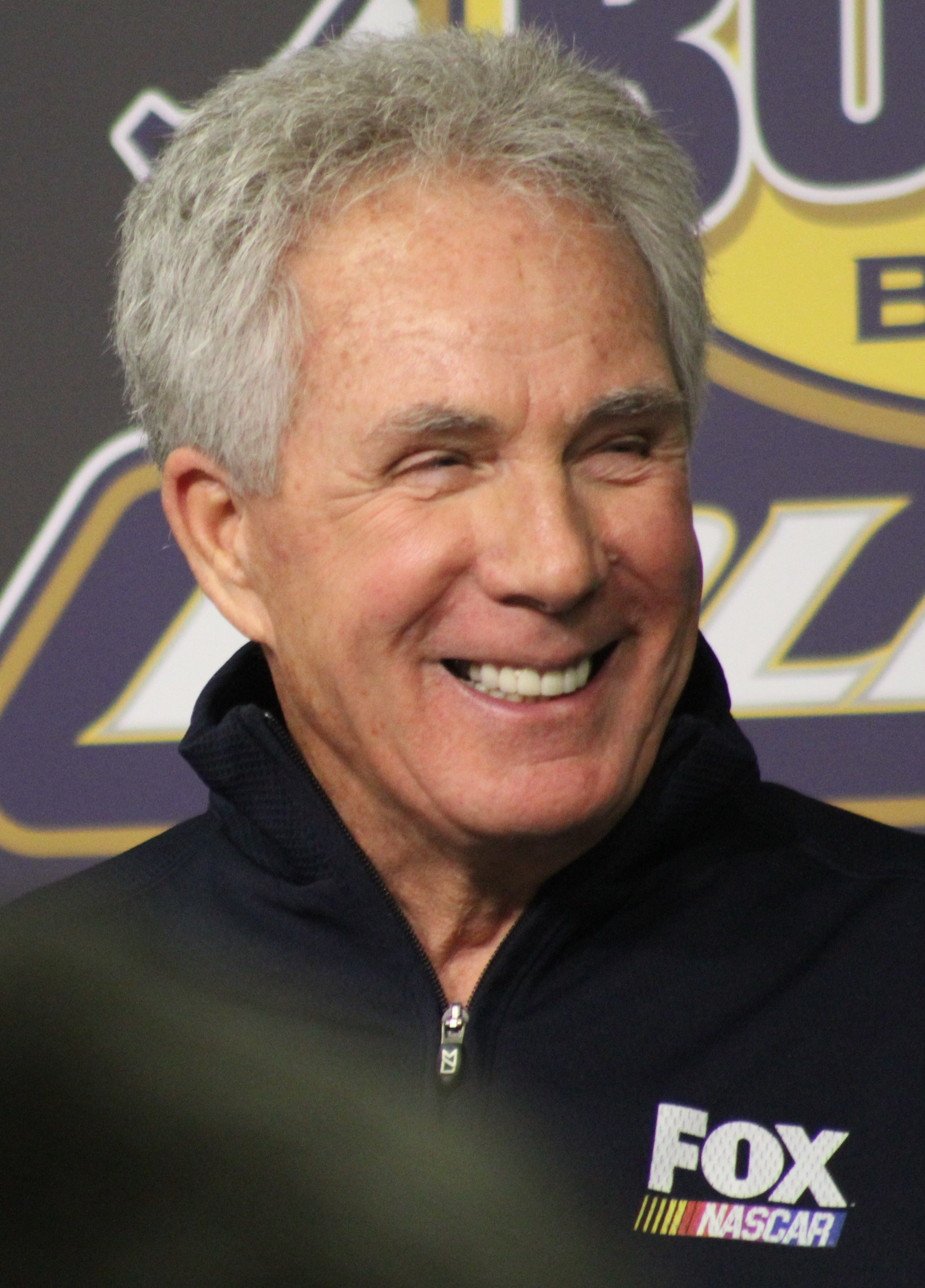
- Waltrip at Bristol Motor Speedway in 2019
- Born: Darrell Lee Waltrip; February 5, 1947 (age 79); Owensboro, Kentucky, U.S.
- Achievements: 1981, 1982, 1985 Winston Cup Series Champion; 1989 Daytona 500 Winner; 1992 Southern 500 Winner; 1978, 1979, 1985, 1988, 1989 Coca-Cola 600 Winner; 1977, 1982 Winston 500 Winner; 1985 The Winston Winner (inaugural race); 1981 Busch Clash Winner; 1976 Snowball Derby Winner; 1987 All American 400 Winner; 1986, 1987 World Crown 300 Winner; 1970, 1973 Fairgrounds Speedway Track Champion
- Awards: 1989, 1990 Winston Cup Series Most Popular Driver; Named one of NASCAR's 50 Greatest Drivers (1998); International Motorsports Hall of Fame (2005); Motorsports Hall of Fame of America (2003); NASCAR Hall of Fame (2012); Fairgrounds Speedway Hall of Fame (2001); Named one of NASCAR's 75 Greatest Drivers (2023)

NASCAR Cup Series career
- 809 races run over 29 years
- Best finish: 1st (1981, 1982, 1985)
- First race: 1972 Winston 500 (Talladega)
- Last race: 2000 NAPA 500 (Atlanta)
- First win: 1975 Music City USA 420 (Nashville)
- Last win: 1992 Southern 500 (Darlington)
Wins	Top tens	Poles
84	390	59

NASCAR O'Reilly Auto Parts Series career
- 95 races run over 14 years
- Best finish: 22nd (1986)
- First race: 1982 Mello Yello 300 (Charlotte)
- Last race: 2006 Goody's 250 (Martinsville)
- First win: 1982 Miller Time 300 (Charlotte)
- Last win: 1989 Goody's 300 (Daytona)
Wins	Top tens	Poles
13	53	4

NASCAR FedEx Freight Truck Series career
- 17 races run over 6 years
- Best finish: 37th (1996)
- First race: 1995 Heartland Tailgate 175 (Heartland)
- Last race: 2005 Kroger 200 (Martinsville)
Wins	Top tens	Poles
0	8	0

NASCAR Grand National East Series career
- 1 race run over 1 year
- First race: 1973 Salem 100 (Salem)
Wins	Top tens	Poles
0	0	0

Darrell Lee Waltrip (born February 5, 1947) is an American motorsports analyst, author as well as a former national television broadcaster and stock car driver. He raced from 1972 to 2000 in the NASCAR Cup Series (known as the NASCAR Winston Cup Series during his time as a driver), most notably driving the No. 11 Chevrolet for Junior Johnson. Waltrip is a three-time Cup Series champion (1981, 1982, 1985).

Widely regarded as one of the greatest drivers in NASCAR history, Waltrip won 84 NASCAR Cup Series races throughout his career, including the 1989 Daytona 500, a record five in the Coca-Cola 600 (formerly the World 600, 1978, 1979, 1985, 1988, 1989), and a track and Cup Series record for any driver at Bristol Motor Speedway with twelve (seven consecutive from 1981 to 1984). He is fifth on NASCAR's all-time wins list in the Cup Series, one behind Bobby Allison. In the modern era of NASCAR, only Jeff Gordon won more races than Waltrip. He is ranked fifth for all-time pole positions with 59, including all-time modern era highs with 35 on short tracks and eight on road courses. Competing in 809 Cup starts over four decades and 29 years (1972–2000), he has scored 271 top-fives and 390 top-tens, and posted a modern NASCAR series record of 22 top five finishes in 1983 and 21 top five finishes both in 1981 and 1986. Winning nearly $19.9 million in posted earnings, he became the first NASCAR driver to be awarded over $10 million in career race winnings.

Waltrip has additionally won thirteen NASCAR Busch Grand National Series races, seven American Speed Association (ASA) races, three IROC races, two Automobile Racing Club of America (ARCA) races, two NASCAR All-American Challenge Series events, two All Pro Racing Association races, and a USAC race. He competed in the 24 Hours of Daytona. He also holds the all-time track record 67 wins at the Fairgrounds Speedway in Nashville, Tennessee, including NASCAR, USAC, ASA, and local Late Model Sportsman NASCAR sanctioned series races. He still holds many NASCAR records, more than two decades after his retirement as an active driver.

Waltrip has also won many awards in NASCAR. That includes two for NASCAR's Most Popular Driver Award (1989, 1990), three for "American Driver of the Year" (1979, 1981, 1982), and "NASCAR's Driver of the Decade" for the 1980s, as well as three for "National Motorsports Press Association Driver of the Year" (1977, 1981, and 1982), two for "Auto Racing Digest Driver of the Year" (1981 and 1982), the first "Tennessee Professional Athlete of the Year" (1979), one of NASCAR's 50 Greatest Drivers in 1998, and the Bill France "Award of Excellence" in 2000. He has been inducted into numerous halls of fame, including the Motorsports Hall of Fame of America for 2003 the International Motorsports Hall of Fame for 2005. After being nominated for the inaugural 2010 and 2011 classes, he was inducted into the NASCAR Hall of Fame's 2012 class.

Waltrip served as a color analyst for Fox Sports alongside Mike Joy, Larry McReynolds, and Jeff Gordon, a columnist at Foxsports.com, and an author. He is the older brother of former NASCAR driver and the now defunct MWR team owner Michael Waltrip. Waltrip retired from the commentary box at the conclusion of Fox's broadcast schedule for the 2019 NASCAR season in June 2019.

== Early years ==
Waltrip was born on February 5, 1947, in Owensboro, Kentucky. Starting his driving career in Go-karts at the age of twelve, Waltrip entered his first stock car race just four years later. Waltrip and his father built a 1936 Chevrolet coupe and headed to a local dirt track near their Owensboro home. The first night out was far from a success as the youngster, barely old enough to drive on the street, slammed the wall and heavily damaged the coupe. Waltrip soon left the dirt and found his niche on asphalt where the smoothness he learned in the karts proved a valuable asset. Waltrip was a 1965 graduate of Daviess County High School in Owensboro.

He was an early racer at the Kentucky Motor Speedway (an asphalt track in Whitesville) and Ellis Raceway, a dirt track on US Highway 60 west in Daviess County (Ellis Raceway is now closed), driving a car called "Big 100" built by Harry Pedley, owner of Pedley's Garage, on West Second Street, in Owensboro and sponsored by R.C. Bratcher Radiator and Welding Co. His success gained the attention of Nashville owner/driver P. B. Crowell, who urged Waltrip to move to the area to race at the Fairgrounds Speedway, at the Tennessee State Fairgrounds in Nashville, where he would win two track championships, in 1970, and 1973.

Waltrip drove the No. 48 P. B. Crowell owned Ford sponsored by American Home, in Nashville, where he aggressively promoted the week's race when he appeared on a local television program promoting the speedway's races, and was not afraid to embrace the local media when other competitors were reluctant to do so. Some of the notorious "on air" trash-talking included making fun of some of the other local drivers such as Coo Coo Marlin (whose son Sterling later raced at the circuit and is a two-time Daytona 500 winner) and James "Flookie" Buford, whose nickname he would mock on air. It pleased track management that he was helping sell tickets, leading to packed grandstands and extra paychecks from track operators for his promotional skills.

He became friends with WSM radio host Ralph Emery in his early years, forming a bond which would be influential throughout his career, as Waltrip would appear frequently on Emery's early morning television show on local Nashville television station, WSMV, and later substitute for Emery in the 1980s on Emery's television show, Nashville Now on the former TNN cable network (now the Paramount Network). Waltrip would use the success he enjoyed at the Music City Motorplex, and his notoriety and public speaking skills that he acquired from television appearances in Nashville, as a springboard into NASCAR's big leagues.

He became a Christian in 1983 but states it was years later before God came first in his life. One of the charities he supports is the Motor Racing Outreach (MRO) providing spiritual support to racers and their families.

== NASCAR career ==
=== Early years in NASCAR: 1972–1975 ===
Waltrip started in NASCAR Winston Cup Series (Winston Cup), NASCAR's top racing series at age 25, (25 years, three months, two days), on May 7, 1972, at the 1972 Winston 500, at Talladega, Alabama, the series' fastest and longest track at 2.66 miles, (4.281 kilometers), driving a 1969 Mercury Cyclone he purchased from Holman-Moody, originally the Ford Fairlane driven by Mario Andretti to victory in the 1967 Daytona 500. Waltrip finished 38th in his first Winston Cup race after retiring on lap 69 due to engine failure. Waltrip paid $12,500 for the car, a spare engine and some spare parts and drove it in five Cup Series events until mid-1973. The car was converted from the Ford Fairlane Andretti drove, to a 1969 Mercury Cyclone as driven by Waltrip, and later converted to a 1971 Mercury Cyclone. The car was sponsored by Terminal Transport of Owensboro, Kentucky, Waltrip's first major sponsor. Waltrip still owns the car today as part of a collection of cars he has raced and is one of his favorites.

The early years found Waltrip competing against legendary stock car racers such as Richard Petty, David Pearson, Cale Yarborough, and Bobby Allison, among others. Waltrip soon earned the respect of his more experienced peers. He was given the No. 95 as a number but Waltrip preferred car No. 17 because his hero, David Pearson, had success with the number in earlier years. As an owner/driver, Waltrip ran five races in 1972, fourteen races in 1973, sixteen races in 1974, with seven top-five finishes, and seventeen races as an owner/driver in 1975, with his first Winston Cup victory coming at his home track, May 10, 1975, at age 28, (28 years, three months, five days), in the Music City 420, outpacing the field by two laps at the track where he had won 2 track championships in Nashville, Tennessee, in the No. 17 Terminal Transport Chevrolet, a car Waltrip owned.

During the 1973 season, Waltrip drove in five Winston Cup races for Bud Moore Engineering.

=== DiGard years: 1975–1980 ===
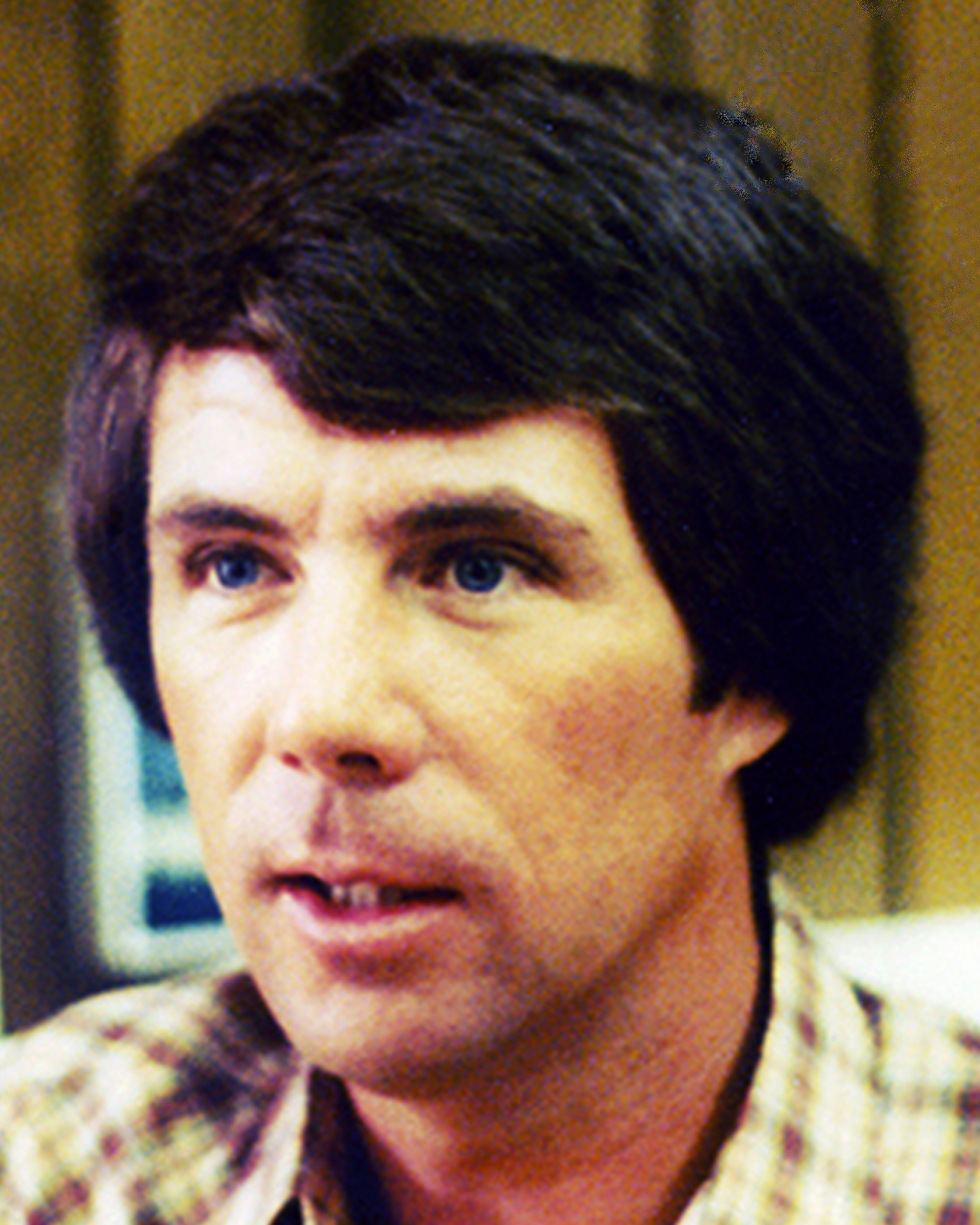
Waltrip in 1979

Except for five races in 1973, driving for Bud Moore Engineering, Waltrip primarily drove his own cars from the beginning of his NASCAR career until the middle of the 1975 NASCAR Winston Cup Series (Winston Cup) season, when he was signed to a multi-year contract and replaced driver Donnie Allison to drive the No. 88 DiGard Chevrolet, Waltrip's long-awaited jump into the big leagues of United States stock car auto racing. The DiGard racing team was founded in part by Mike DiProspero and Bill Gardner, who were brothers-in-law, with the legendary Robert Yates as engine builder.

Waltrip's first race with DiGard came on August 17, 1975, at the Talladega 500, Talladega Superspeedway, in Talladega, Alabama, finishing 42nd after experiencing engine failure. Waltrip would compete in ten more races in the 1975 season for DiGard, sponsored by Terminal Transport, and get his second career Winston Cup victory October 12, 1975, in the Capital City 500, in Richmond, Virginia. He would post three top-five and four top-ten finishes in the eleven races he ran for DiGard in 1975.

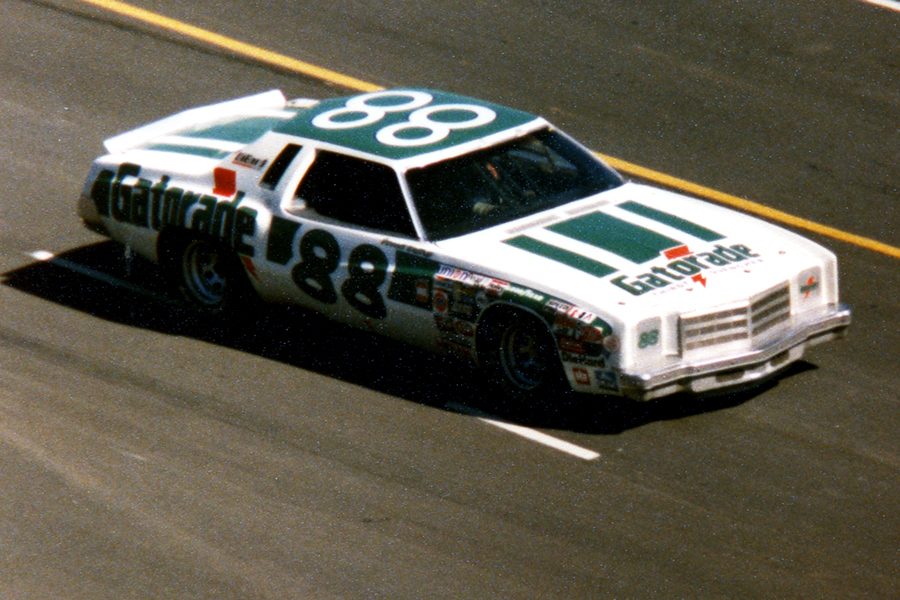
DiGard Gatorade Chevrolet Monte Carlo that Waltrip drove to victory in the 1978 World 600, Concord, NC, May 28, 1978

During the late 1970s, Waltrip would begin his domination of NASCAR's short track venues, especially at the Bristol International Speedway (Bristol, Tennessee), Martinsville Speedway (Martinsville, Virginia) and the Music City Motorplex (Nashville). He holds the track record at Bristol International Speedway, for wins with twelve victories, and for pole positions at Martinsville Speedway, with 8 pole position awards.

In 1976, Gatorade became Waltrip's primary sponsor as he started his first full race season at age 29, driving the DiGard Gatorade Chevrolet. Waltrip won only one Winston Cup race in 1976, the Virginia 500, at Martinsville Speedway in Ridgeway, Virginia, but in 1977 and 1978, working with legendary NASCAR crew chief Buddy Parrott, he won six times each year, including his first of four career victories at the Talladega Superspeedway, in Talladega, AL, on May 1, 1977, and his first of a five career victories in the series' longest race, a grueling 600 mile race, the Coca-Cola 600 (formerly the World 600), May 28, 1978. Waltrip, and Parrott, would win 21 NASCAR races together from 1977 through 1980.

In perhaps the most famous and most well known NASCAR race, the 1979 Daytona 500, held February 18, 1979, a race that Richard Petty won, Waltrip was a pre-race favorite to win the race. As the first NASCAR race covered "flag to flag" on national television, Cale Yarborough, and Donnie Allison, while battling for the lead on the last lap, came together and crashed hard, taking each other out in the third turn. While the Allison and Yarborough cars were spinning and coming to rest in the grassy infield, attention turned quickly to the new leaders, Richard Petty running third, and Waltrip, running closely behind in fourth, as a fist fight ensued between Yarborough, Donnie Allison, and his brother and racer, Bobby Allison, in the turn three grass. Earlier in the race, Waltrip's DiGard Gatorade Oldsmobile, dropped a cylinder and while able to hang onto the slipstream of the Petty car on the final lap, was not able to draft past the Petty car in the fourth turn on the final lap due to the reduction in horsepower. Still, Waltrip finished runner-up in perhaps the most famous race in NASCAR history, and was an early turning point in Waltrip's career.

The 1979 Daytona 500 would be an early season precursor for the remaining nine months of the racing season. Waltrip and Petty would engage in a bitter battle, race after race, for the 1979 NASCAR championship. In that 1979 season, Waltrip won seven Winston Cup races and was a serious contender for what would have been his first championship despite numerous engine failures, mechanical problems, and differences with DiGard management. On September 23, 1979, after winning pole position and leading 184 laps at the Old Dominion 500, at Martinsville, Virginia, Waltrip again experienced engine failure. The DiGard team pitted the car and made a rare mid-race engine change in a record 11 minutes. Waltrip lost 29 laps in the pits but was able to finish 11th, as Petty finished 2nd.

At the start of the final race of the season, the Los Angeles Times 500, at Ontario Motor Speedway, Ontario, California, Waltrip led Richard Petty by a scant two points in the year-long championship battle after finishing the race fifth ahead of Petty's sixth-place finish in the previous race, the Dixie 500, Atlanta Motor Speedway, November 4, 1979. However, Petty won an unprecedented seventh, and his final, NASCAR Cup Series championship by finishing the final race of the season in 5th position, as Waltrip finished eighth. The final margin of Petty's championship victory over Waltrip was only eleven points, the third-closest points race in NASCAR Cup Series history.

Waltrip closed out the 1970s driving the No. 88 DiGard Chevrolet, sponsored by Gatorade, ranked NASCAR's No. 2 driver, having won 22 Winston Cup races in just 149 race starts. His aggressive driving style and outspoken demeanor earned him the nickname "Jaws", a reference to the 1975 film about a killer shark. The nickname was given to Waltrip by rival Cale Yarborough in an interview after Waltrip crashed Yarborough and D.K. Ulrich out of the 1977 Southern 500. Ulrich assumed that Yarborough had caused the wreck and questioned him after the race, to which Yarborough famously responded, "That Jaws ran into you." Waltrip himself preferred the nicknames "D.W." or "D-Dubya" but he acknowledged Yarborough by displaying an inflatable toy shark in his pit at the next race.

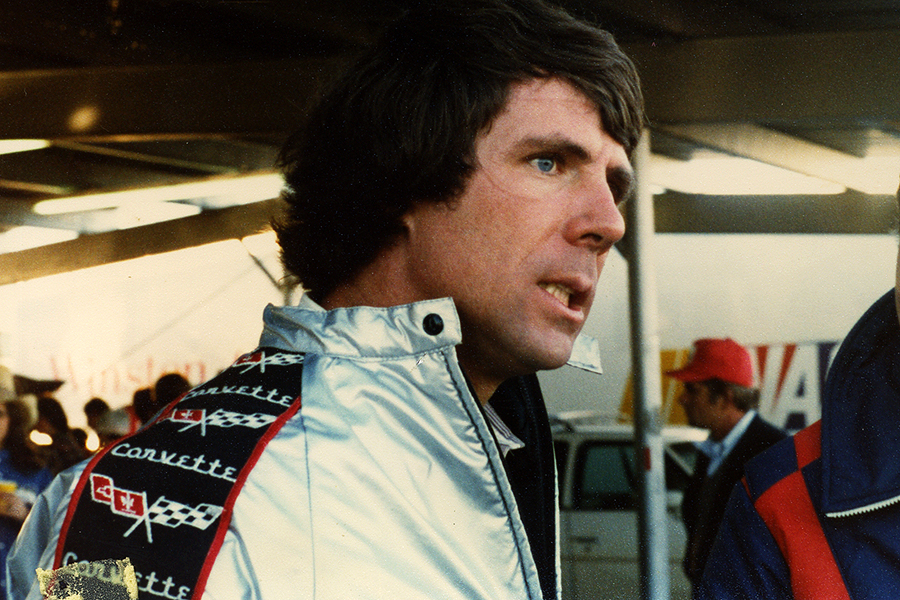
Darrell Waltrip, discussing his fifth-place finish and prospects for winning his first NASCAR driving championship after the Dixie 500, Atlanta Motor Speedway, November 4, 1979, driving his DiGard Gatorade Chevrolet Monte Carlo

At the height of his NASCAR Cup Series success in the early 1980s, fans often booed Waltrip, in large part because of his success on the track defeating more established drivers with large fan followings, but also because of his open criticism of NASCAR, his admitting to condoning cheating, and his aggressive "take no prisoners", "win at all costs" approach to driving. Doing him no favors was his widely publicized falling-out with DiGard leadership, where he publicly admitted that he would not have won a championship as long as he drove for them. He attempted several times to be released from his driving contract with DiGard in 1980, a year in which Waltrip won five Winston Cup races. Still, Waltrip had a huge and devoted fan following. It was often said by race commentators and sports columnists that "you either hate him or love him".

It was Waltrip's rival Cale Yarborough, driver for legendary owner Junior Johnson, that privately told Waltrip that he intended to cut back on his racing appearances and leave Junior Johnson & Associates team at the end of the 1980 season, opening the position for Waltrip, but only if Waltrip could successfully negotiate an early termination of his contract with DiGard. Waltrip successfully negotiated his exit from DiGard, and would take over the No. 11 for 1981.

=== Junior Johnson years: 1981–1986 ===
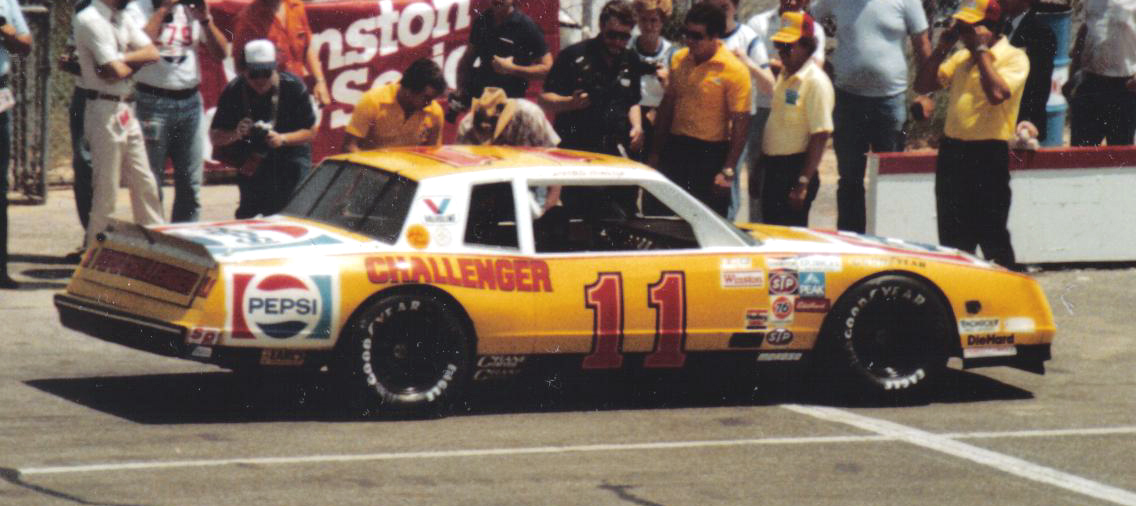
1983 Junior Johnson Pepsi Challenger Chevrolet Monte Carlo SS. The paint scheme also found its way on a Nimrod NRA/C2 Waltrip drove in the 1983 24 Hours of Daytona.

Waltrip's success driving the Junior Johnson prepared cars came immediately and even surpassed the highly successful years he had with DiGard. In his first two years as driver for the Mountain Dew sponsored Buick Regal, Waltrip won 12 races each year, and his first two NASCAR Winston Cup Series (Winston Cup) championships, in 1981 and 1982. Waltrip's success and driving prowess helped to bring the Buick Grand National into prominence. The company later honored the Waltrip years with throwback paint schemes, once in 2006 and again in 2008.

It was during the early 1980s, with Junior Johnson, that Waltrip first worked with Jeff Hammond, a pit crewman for Johnson. Hammond was at first skeptical of Waltrip's driving style since it differed so much from the former driver for whom he worked, Cale Yarborough. Yarborough made adjustments to his driving based on the handling of the car in a particular race whereas Waltrip wanted the car adjusted around his driving style. Hammond eventually came to appreciate Waltrip's "finesse", and smooth driving style which proved highly successful. Waltrip and Hammond would benefit from each other's knowledge and abilities and would work together for most of their careers in the sport. Waltrip and Hammond work together, even today, as broadcaster and analyst at Fox Sports, and Speed TV.

Waltrip's first season with Junior Johnson was a huge success. He won twelve races including big races such as the Rebel 500, the Food City 500, and the Riverside 400 event. He almost swept Talladega for his 1981 season by nearly winning the Talladega 500. On the final lap rookie Ron Bouchard dove under Waltrip and Terry Labonte to take the lead. Bouchard beat Waltrip by a foot in a 3-wide drag race in what has been called the biggest upset in NASCAR history. Waltrip reportedly said "Where the hell did he come from?" in an interview. Waltrip also stated in a post-race conference that part of the reason he lost the race was because he thought Bouchard was a lap down and therefore did not block Bouchard.

He ended 1981 with eleven poles, twelve wins, 21 top fives, and 25 top tens. Not only did Waltrip win twelve races, he also won the Winston Cup championship over nemesis Bobby Allison, rallying from a nearly 300-point deficit in midsummer and taking the points lead for keeps with a second-place finish at Dover in September. Waltrip then strung together four consecutive victories and ran well in the final two races of the season to win by 53 points.

In 1982, Waltrip again won twelve races and basically repeated his 1981 season. He claimed his second championship in a row that year, again scratching and clawing his way past Bobby Allison with a late-season charge, taking the lead at Martinsville in October, and winning the title by 72 points.

At the 1983 Daytona 500 on February 20, 1983, Waltrip, a pre-race favorite to win the race, drove the Chevrolet Monte Carlo SS Pepsi Challenger. He was involved in an accident when his car spun on lap 64, at exit of turn 4, at nearly 200 mph (320 km/h), as he was making an evasive maneuver to avoid rear-ending a much slower car ahead of him. Waltrip locked his brakes but the car slid for several hundred feet, then struck an earthen embankment near the entrance to pit road. The force of the impact was so violent that Waltrip's car was thrown back onto the track, in front of oncoming traffic. Waltrip then made hard contact with the outside concrete retaining wall once again into oncoming traffic. Cale Yarborough, the eventual winner of the race, barely avoided hitting the demolished Pepsi Challenger. Waltrip was taken by ambulance to the Halifax Medical Center for observation and medical treatment. The crash was a wake-up call and a life-changing event for Waltrip. When he heard drivers and fans joking that the crash would "knock him conscious" or "finally shut him up", he realized for the first time how unpopular he was and resolved to clean up his image. The years following that crash would see a different Darrell Waltrip, one who worked hard to repair and rebuild his relationship with fans and fellow drivers. Years later, Waltrip would be voted (by NASCAR fans) "Most Popular Driver", two years in a row, (1989, 1990).

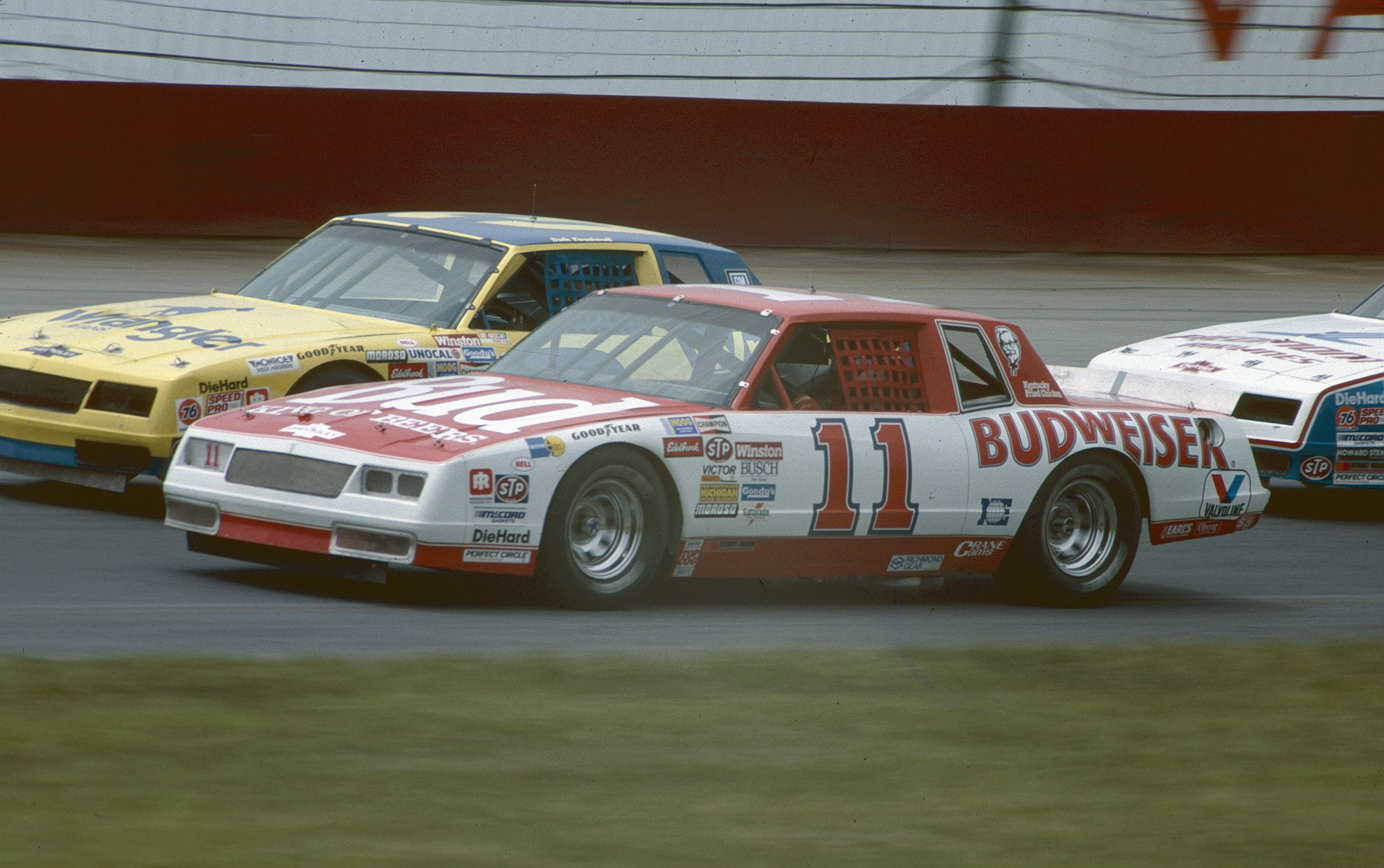
1985 Budweiser Chevrolet Monte Carlo owned by Junior Johnson, and driven by Waltrip to the 1985 NASCAR driving championship

Waltrip would continue his unprecedented success driving for Junior Johnson through the 1986 season, winning his third and final Winston Cup championship, in 1985, winning the inaugural All-Star race, The Winston, in 1985, and compiling 43 total wins with the team.

Waltrip recognized the new and rapid expansion of the sport's popularity among teens and young adults and others never before considered NASCAR fans. The growth was primarily due to increasing national network and cable subscription television which televised almost every NASCAR event live, and the growing interest of new family oriented sponsors never before associated with motorsports. NASCAR was becoming a multi-regional sport enjoyed by men, women and children alike. In addition to the influx of money from new sponsors and television, the more astute NASCAR team owners embraced new resources such as computers, telemetry, research and development, multi-car teams for information sharing, wind-tunnel testing, and engineering. Waltrip, now one of two drivers for Johnson, envisioned the future of NASCAR and sought to take advantage of the coming changes something his car owner, Junior Johnson a pioneer of the sport, was somewhat reluctant to embrace. Johnson and his team had enjoyed success for decades and won numerous races and championships spanning decades using his own formulas for success.

Aware of Junior Johnson's long-standing steadfast rule of never discussing an adjustment to a driver's contractual salary, and never really comfortable with the allocation of resources that Johnson's two car team required, Waltrip approached Johnson about an increase in his contract salary. Although the story as told by Waltrip is most likely folklore, Waltrip drove his final race for Junior Johnson on November 16, 1986, in a Chevrolet sponsored by Budweiser finishing 4th at that year's Winston Western 500 at Riverside International Raceway, completing one of the most successful owner/driver partnerships in all of motorsports history. Waltrip and Johnson remained close friends and respected each other as pioneers and champions of the sport.

=== Hendrick Motorsports years: 1987–1990 ===
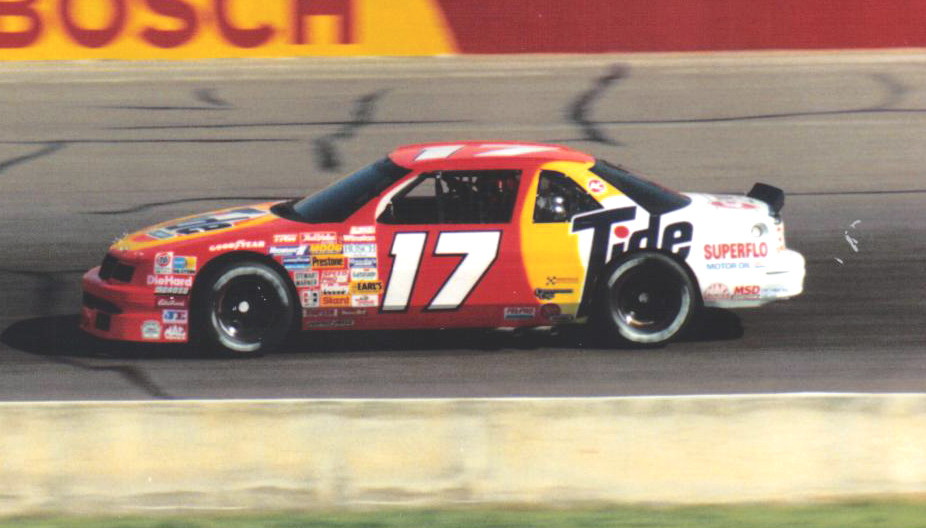
1989 Hendrick Motorsports Tide Chevrolet Lumina

Waltrip's partnership with car owner Junior Johnson led to huge success with three NASCAR Winston Cup Series (Winston Cup) championships and 43 Winston Cup wins. The connection between fast cars and alcohol consumption became a concern for him. He began to seek other opportunities after a conversation with his friend and pastor Cortez Cooper. Johnson had signed Budweiser to be his team's primary sponsor in 1984, which unintentionally made Waltrip one of the faces of the connection he was so concerned about.

Years before, Waltrip had opened a Honda dealership in his home town of Franklin, Tennessee, with the help of his friend, Rick Hendrick, owner of Hendrick Motorsports. During the 1986 season, Waltrip and Hendrick discussed the possibility of Waltrip joining the Hendrick organization, which fielded cars for Geoff Bodine and Tim Richmond and the two discussed the potential of Waltrip moving to a new team. Waltrip was still under contract with Johnson for the 1986 season, but following the year he was able to break the contract in a unique way. As he recounted in an interview for the Fox Sports Net series Beyond the Glory in 2001, Waltrip gained his release by purposely breaking one of Johnson's cardinal rules: asking for a raise (Johnson forbade his drivers from discussing money matters, including raises, with him). After signing, Hendrick formed a third team for Waltrip, carrying the No. 17 and sponsored by Tide.

In 1987, his first year with Hendrick Motorsports, Waltrip had limited success, compared to his previous years with Johnson. He won only one race (at the Goody's 500) and had six Top 5 finishes. In 1988, he won two races, including his fourth Coca-Cola 600 win.

In the first race of 1989, the Daytona 500, Waltrip won the race for the first time in his seventeenth attempt with a fuel conservation strategy along with his long-time crew chief Jeff Hammond, making his final pit stop for fuel a distant 53 laps (132 miles) from the finish. Most of the other cars could run no more than 45 or 46 laps on a tank of fuel, so that meant Waltrip would need to feather the throttle and draft off other cars in order to save enough fuel to make it to the finish without an additional pit stop. Hammond, interviewed by television pit reporters during the final laps of the race, said that his strategy was for Waltrip to "draft off anybody, and everybody", to save fuel. Even though Waltrip's car ran much slower than other cars in the last 53 laps, he was able to avoid making the additional pit stop for fuel that the other cars had to make. The strategy provided Waltrip with the track position needed to win the race. His post-race interview with CBS pit reporter Mike Joy, became famous, with Waltrip shouting "I won the Daytona 500! I won the Daytona 500! Wait, this is the Daytona 500 ain't it? ...Thank God!", accompanied by the "Ickey Shuffle" dance in Victory Lane. Later, after the Daytona 500 win, Waltrip visited president George H. W. Bush at the white House in Washington, D.C.

Waltrip's popularity as a driver would come full circle on the evening of The Winston, an all-star racing event held May 21, 1989, (an event that did not award points toward the NASCAR national championship), at Charlotte Motor Speedway. With two laps to go, Waltrip was leading the race and poised to win when Rusty Wallace hit his car exiting the fourth turn, sending him into the infield and costing him the victory and the $200,000 purse. Not only was Waltrip and his crew upset at being knocked out of the victory, the 150,000 fans watching the race issued boos to Wallace, the winner. The two crews scuffled in the pits and harsh words were said after the race. Waltrip was quoted after the race as saying "I hope he chokes on it", referring to the $200,000 that Wallace collected for the victory. Waltrip's car was clearly superior to that of Wallace and, had it not been for the contact initiated by Wallace on the final lap, Waltrip would have won the all-star event. During the 1989, and 1990 seasons, Waltrip was voted NASCAR's Most Popular Driver by fans.

Waltrip would win six races in 1989, his best year with Hendrick Motorsports, and helped develop NASCAR's version of the new Chevrolet Lumina in 1989, and delivered its first victory by winning a historic and unprecedented fifth Coca-Cola 600 that May. Besides establishing a race record for victories, the win prepared him for a chance to win the one remaining "major race" which had eluded him since his first race at the Heinz Southern 500 at Darlington. A Darlington victory would award him a one million dollar bonus for winning three of the sport's four majors in the same season, the Daytona 500, the Winston 500, Coca-Cola 600, and the Mountain Dew Southern 500. The pressure of both the million dollar bonus and Career Grand Slam adversely affected Waltrip. He made contact with the wall early in the 1989 Southern 500 and was never a contender for winning the race, and the million dollar bonus.

For many reasons, Waltrip was unable to carry his success of the previous year into 1990. Waltrip failed to visit victory lane all season although he finished second in a controversial finish in the season's seventh race, the First Union 400, at North Wilkesboro Speedway. Brett Bodine had led 63 laps in the middle of the race and then re-took the lead on lap 318 after short pitting on a round of green flag pit stops. When the caution came out on lap 321, the pace car mistakenly picked up Dale Earnhardt as the race leader, putting Brett almost a full lap in front of the entire field. During the ensuing confusion of a seventeen lap caution flag (NASCAR did not have electronic scoring at the time) Bodine was able to make a pit stop for fresh tires without losing any positions. When NASCAR reset the lineup with Bodine as the leader, he led the final 83 laps of the race (a race-high 146 laps overall) to take the victory.

"We messed up," said Chip Williams, NASCAR's public relations director. "By throwing the caution on the second-place car, it kept Bodine in the lead. He slipped into the pits and came out without losing the lead because the pace car was keeping the second-place car back. We messed up by picking up the wrong car. It was a judgment call." Waltrip filed a protest post-race, only to be denied on the grounds that judgment calls were not subject to protest/appeal. 1990 was the first year since 1974, that Waltrip did not win a race and Waltrip still remains irked to this very day over the result. Waltrip only visited victory lane five more times and never won again after 1992.

While practicing for his five-hundredth career NASCAR start in the Pepsi 400, at Daytona, Waltrip's car spun in oil laid down by another car experiencing engine failure, and was hit by an oncoming car driven by Dave Marcis. Waltrip suffered a broken arm, a broken leg, and a concussion. He missed the Pepsi 400, but came back to run one lap at Pocono, before giving way to Jimmy Horton as a relief driver. (A driver who starts, and completes one lap, is credited the NASCAR points regardless of who is driving the car at the finish). Despite missing the next five races due to his injuries, Waltrip finished twentieth in driver points and the team finished fifth in owner points with substitute drivers taking turns in the car.

=== Owner-driver years: 1991–mid-1998 ===
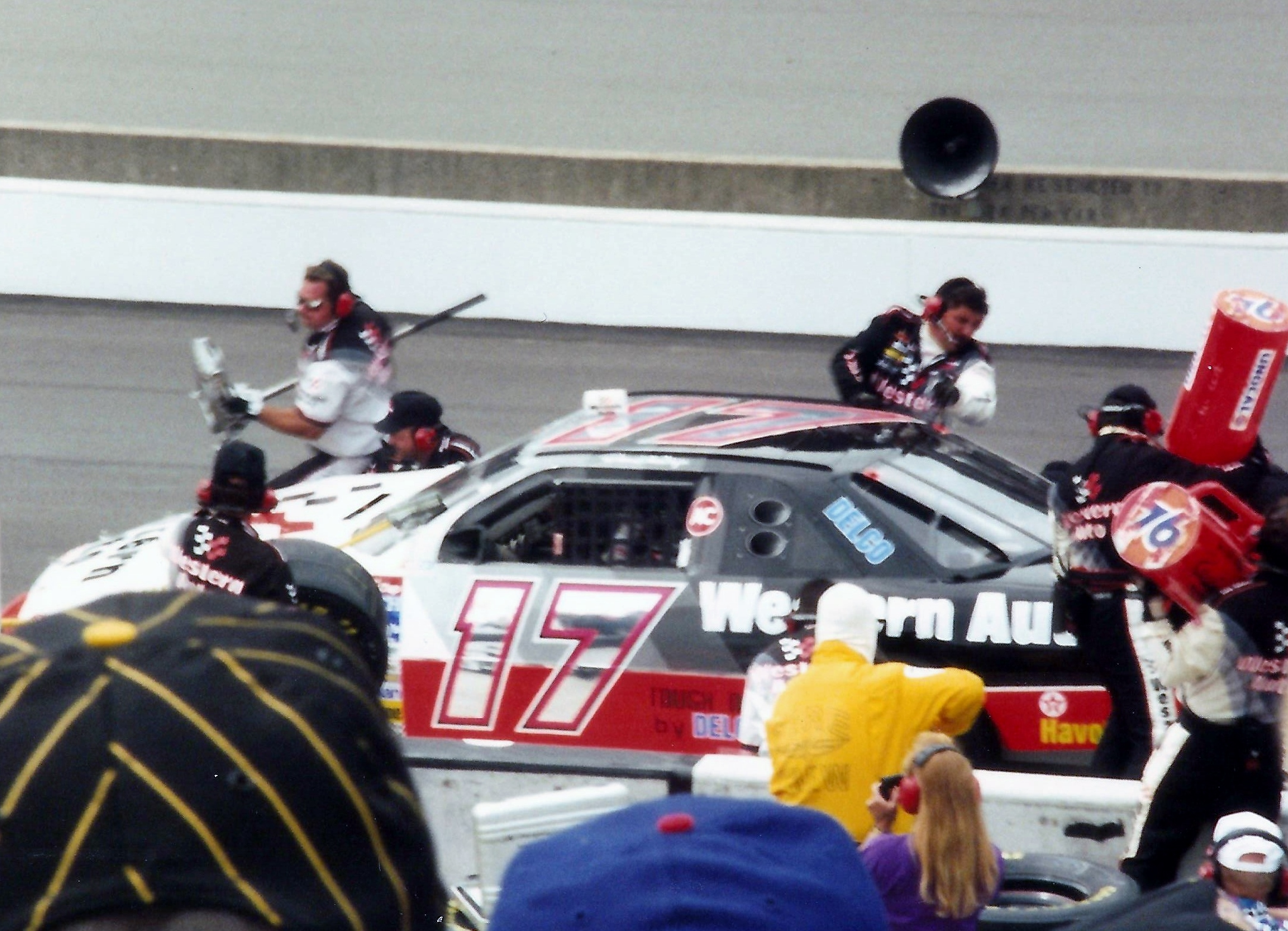
Waltrip in the pits during the 1994 Brickyard 400

After his fourth season as a driver for Hendrick Motorsports, Waltrip formed his own team to field cars in the 1991 Winston Cup season. Driving his own cars had been his passion since he successfully drove his own cars in his early NASCAR career in the early and mid-1970s. He would continue his relationship with Chevrolet and drive a Chevrolet Lumina with Western Auto as the primary team sponsor. Waltrip purchased team assets, including the racing facilities, from his former owner Rick Hendrick in Charlotte, North Carolina, and hired long-time friend and crew chief, Jeff Hammond, to oversee the building of race cars and to continue as crew chief. Waltrip and Hammond enjoyed much success together as Hammond had been with Waltrip during the championship-winning years with Junior Johnson, and most of the Hendrick Motorsports years, and was Waltrip's crew chief for his 1989 Daytona 500 win and three of his five Coca-Cola 600 wins.

In the 1991 season, Waltrip visited victory lane twice, his first win in his second stint as owner-driver coming in only the 7th race of the season on April 21, 1991, in the First Union 400, at North Wilkesboro Speedway in North Wilkesboro, North Carolina. His second win of the year came in the thirteenth race of the season on June 16, 1991, in the Champion Spark Plug 500, at Pocono Raceway, in Long Pond, Pennsylvania.

Just two races after celebrating his second win of 1991, Waltrip would again be involved in another serious crash at the summer Daytona race. On lap 119, Waltrip and Alan Kulwicki were racing side by side, leading a large grouping of cars battling for 5th position, with Kulwicki receiving drafting help from Sterling Marlin. Heading down the backstretch, Marlin bumped Kulwicki, causing his car to hit Waltrip's Western Auto Chevrolet at speeds approaching 200 mph on the long backstretch. Waltrip's car slowed and was collected by Joe Ruttman's car, both cars sliding sideways several hundred feet on the grassy infield. Waltrip's tires clipped the edge of an access road causing it to become airborne and tumbling end over end several times before coming to a stop, upside-down, in a grassy area near turn three. Waltrip was extricated and only suffered minor injuries but many feared that he could have re-injured his shattered leg from the crash at the same track the previous year. (Slow-motion video and still photography showed that Waltrip's left arm was outside the car as the car tumbled, and came to rest.) Waltrip still had a plate in his left leg from the compound fractures he suffered in the earlier crash at the Pepsi 400, at the Daytona International Speedway, (Waltrip commented on the January 10, 2013 SPEED Television broadcast of the Daytona NASCAR winter testing that he had spent more time in the hospital from injuries suffered at Daytona than at any other track he had raced). Waltrip would compete in the following race, the summer race at Pocono, but was crashed again when Ernie Irvan spun Hut Stricklin in front of almost the entire field. Waltrip won the year's spring race at the track just five weeks before.

Waltrip finished the first year of his second stint as owner-driver 8th in the overall Winston Cup points championship, after being as high as third place after fourteen races. His first year was generally viewed as a successful first year outing. However, Waltrip was now 44 years old, had children, and had many pressures as owner/driver that he did not concern himself with driving for multimillion-dollar, highly financed race teams, such as Hendrick Motorsports.

In 1992, Waltrip collected three more wins, including the Mountain Dew Southern 500 at Darlington in September (the last major race which had eluded his 20-year career), and finished 9th in points, after being as high as sixth after 22 races. That would be Waltrip's 84th and final NASCAR career victory, tying him with Bobby Allison for what was then third on the all-time list behind Richard Petty, with 200 wins, and David Pearson, with 105 wins. Both he and Allison have since been passed by Jeff Gordon, who has 93 wins by the time he retired at the end of the 2015 season.

In 1993, Waltrip signed former Richard Childress Racing engine builder Lou LaRosa, to build engines, and Barry Dodson, a former championship-winning crew chief. He posted four top-ten finishes but did not finish higher than third. 1994 saw him make his final appearance in the top ten in championship points by finishing ninth. He had a then-unprecedented streak over two seasons, of 40 races, without a DNF, all with in-house engines. His only engine failure in the season was after the car crossed the finish line. Waltrip finished 19th in points in 1995 when he crashed at The Winston and was forced to let relief drivers take over for several weeks. His second half of the season was highlighted by his final career pole position at the NAPA 500.

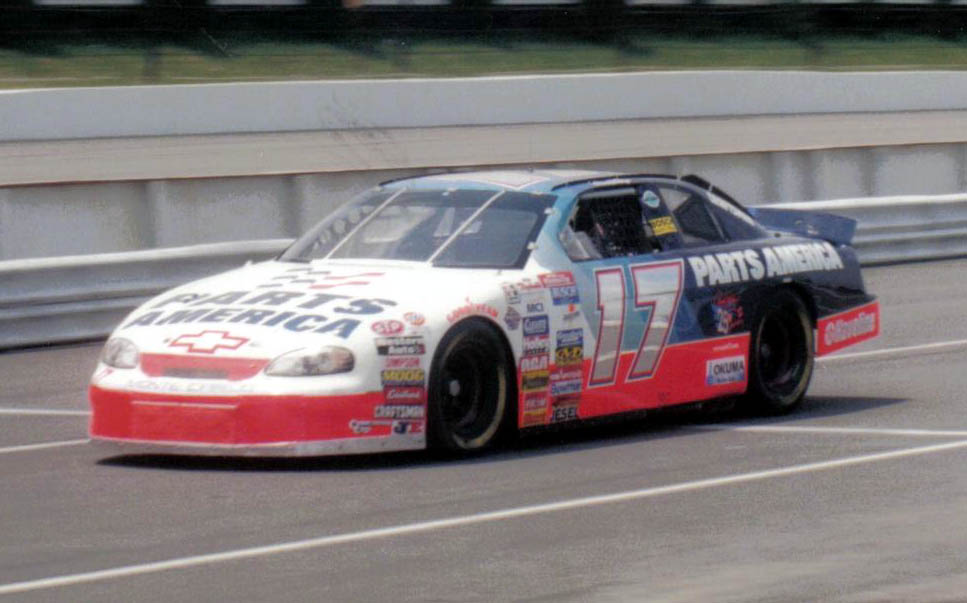
Waltrip in his 1997 Western Auto Chevrolet Monte Carlo

In 1996, Waltrip posted two top-ten finishes. Western Auto remained the sponsor as part of Waltrip's 25th-anniversary celebration. While the year was one of Waltrip's most profitable, his results continued to fall off.

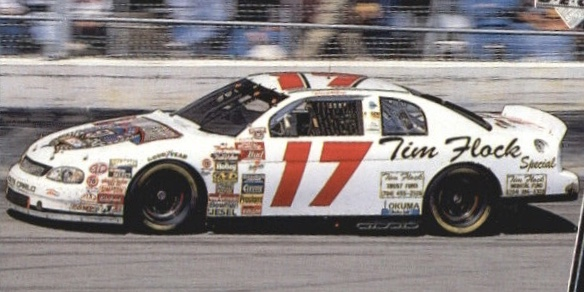
Waltrip's #17 Tim Flock Special Chevrolet Monte Carlo, his final owner-driver race in Darlington (1998)

At the 1997 UAW-GM Quality 500, Waltrip failed to qualify for the first time in over twenty years as Terry Labonte also failed to make the race. Because Labonte was a more recent Cup champion (in fact, he was the defending Cup champion that season), he was able to take the past champion's provisional. Waltrip, who was twentieth in owner points, was too low in the owner points position to make the race (only the top-four in owner points of cars not in the field, excluding the most recent former champion not in the field, were added after qualifying under 1997 rules). After the season, Waltrip and his team struggled to find sponsors, but were able to put together a last-minute deal with the Ohio-based company Speedblock for 1998. Speedblock only paid portions of what was promised, and the deal was canceled. Waltrip's team at this point was nearly insolvent, and he sold the team to Tim Beverly. Waltrip's final race as an owner-driver was at the TranSouth Financial 400, and was originally post-drive a sponsorless car, but instead decided to drive a "Tim Flock Special" as the former 2-time Grand National Series champion was fighting liver and throat cancer and was without medical insurance, and Waltrip wanted to help raise money for Flock and his family by having a trust fund with NASCAR's 50th Anniversary. Flock died at age 73, just nine days after the race. In 2008, Waltrip admitted the reason that he failed as a driver-owner team was because he thought like a driver, not as an owner.

=== 1998 mid season with DEI ===
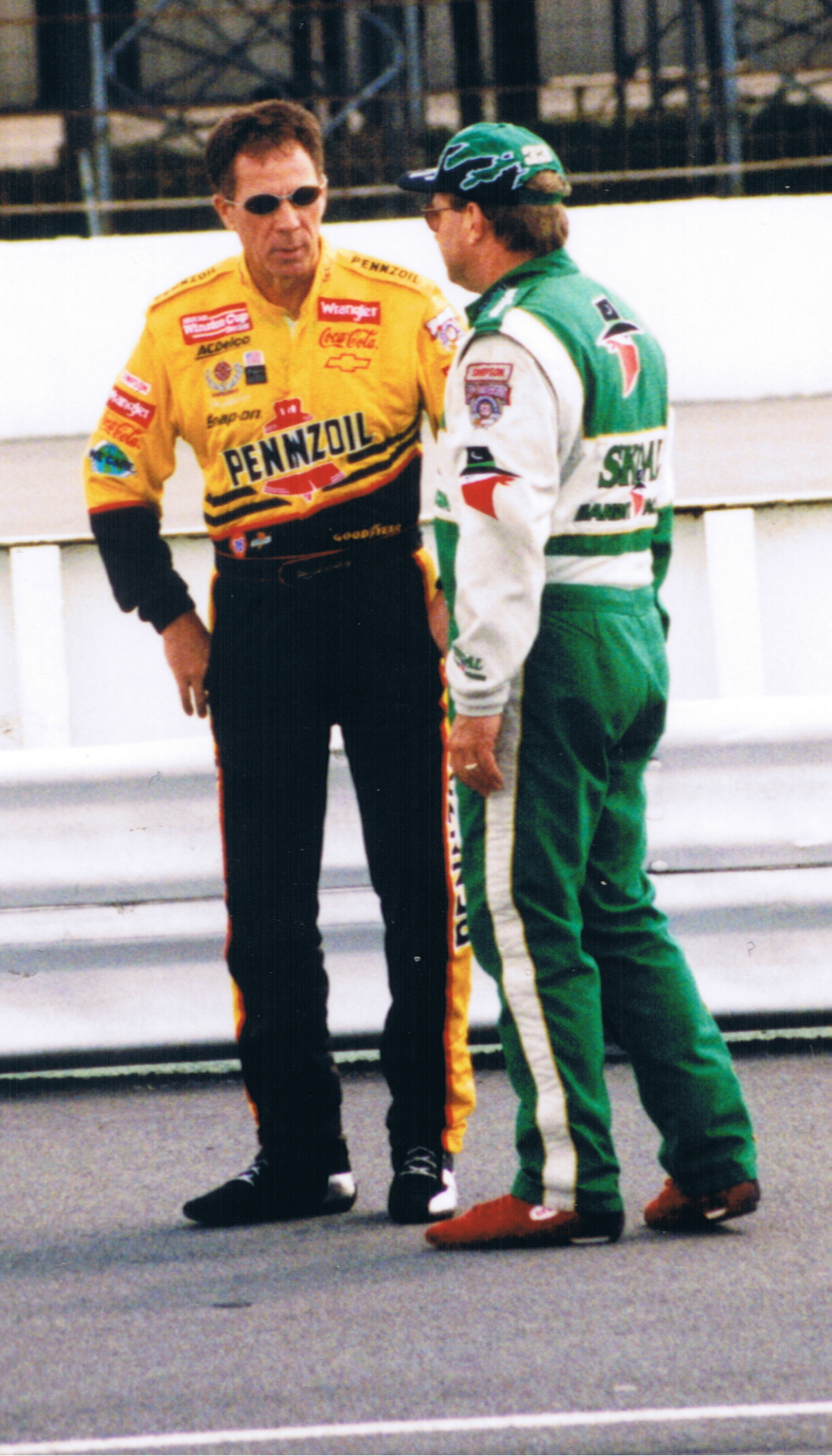
Waltrip (left) with Ken Schrader at Pocono in 1998

Beverly chose not to race the team immediately, instead choosing to rebuild the team (now part of Tyler Jet Motorsports after two sales and a merger). During this time, Waltrip signed with Dale Earnhardt, Inc. to drive the No. 1 Pennzoil Chevy, filling in for injured rookie Steve Park. During his tenure with DEI, Waltrip posted a fifth-place finish at the California 500, and led in the final stages of the Pocono 500, and finished sixth.

=== Final years of racing: 1998–2000 ===
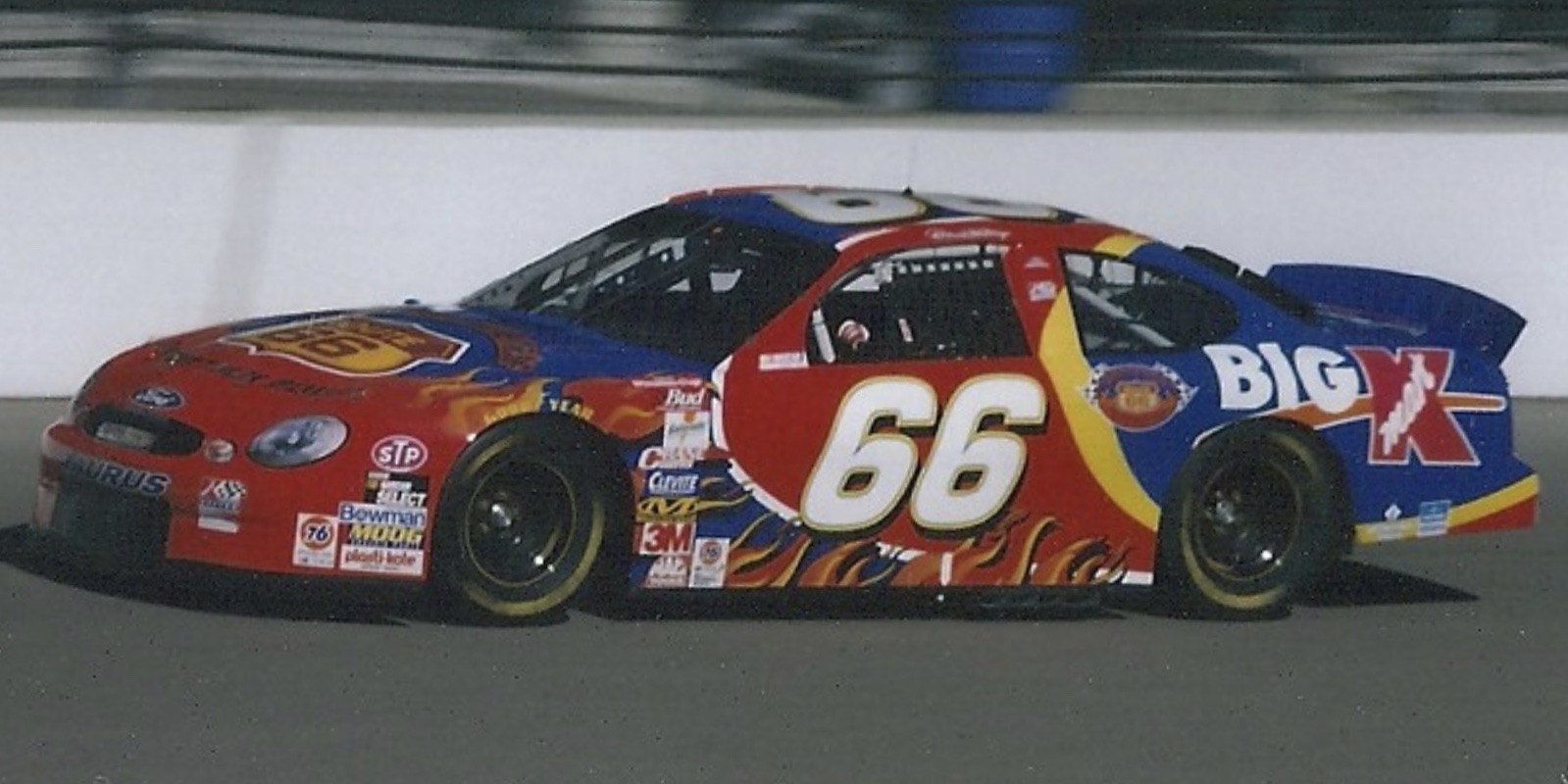
Waltrip's No. 66 Ford Taurus at the 1999 Brickyard 400

At the 1998 Brickyard 400, Beverly returned Waltrip's former team, now as the No. 35 Tyler Jet Motorsports Chevrolet Monte Carlo with Tabasco sponsorship with Waltrip driving. A sponsorship conflict with Tabasco would switch the team to the Pontiac Grand Prix. Waltrip resigned at the end of the season, citing performance issues. After a brief flirtation with retirement, Waltrip signed to drive the No. 66 Big K Ford Taurus for Haas-Carter Motorsports, with teammate Jimmy Spencer. Waltrip failed to qualify seven times during that season with a new qualifying rule for the Past Champion's Provisional. On August 5, 1999, Waltrip announced during the practice session for the Brickyard 400 that he would retire from NASCAR at the end of the 2000 season following a farewell tour.

During his retirement year of 2000, Waltrip's best run came at the Brickyard 400, where he qualified on the outside pole and finished eleventh. For the Coca-Cola 600, Waltrip bought a ride from Carl Long and Mansion Motorsports. His final race came on November 20, 2000, in the NAPA 500, at Atlanta Motor Speedway, where he posted a 34th-place finish in the Haas-Carter Motorsports owned No. 66 Route 66 Big K Ford Taurus. He finished 36th in points that season and failed to qualify six times.

== Craftsman Truck Series ==
In 1995, Waltrip built a Craftsman Truck Series team, and found success by 1997, when Rich Bickle finished second in overall season standings, winning three races, and made Waltrip one of the few car owners to have won races in NASCAR's three national series. When Sears ceased sponsorship of the team in 1997, Waltrip suspended his truck team, not returning until 2004, when he re-entered the series as an owner and part of Toyota's NASCAR development program.

== Broadcast career: 2001–2019 ==
Prior to retiring from racing, Waltrip provided commentary on several IROC broadcasts for ABC. Also, from 1994 to 1998, on weekends that Winston Cup was not competing, had provided commentary on many NASCAR Busch Series (one level below Winston Cup) races broadcasts on TNN, teaming with Mike Joy. In 2001, after his final 2000 season as a NASCAR driver, Waltrip signed with Fox, to be lead NASCAR Winston Cup Series (Winston Cup) analyst and race commentator on the network's NASCAR telecasts, teaming with Mike Joy and Larry McReynolds.

=== Inaugural broadcasts and safety advocate ===
Waltrip began his career with Fox at the 2001 Daytona 500. His younger brother, Michael Waltrip, won the race, but Michael's victory was overshadowed by the death of Dale Earnhardt. On the final scheduled lap, Earnhardt's car made contact with Sterling Marlin, as the black No. 3 drifted low on the track, probably attempting a blocking maneuver so that either Michael Waltrip or Dale Earnhardt Jr. – driving for Dale Sr.'s DEI, although he himself drove for RCR – would win the race. After contacting the Marlin car, Earnhardt's car suddenly veered right and slammed hard head-on into the retaining wall in turn four. Earnhardt's car came to rest in the infield as Michael Waltrip won the race, with Darrell Waltrip shouting for joy as he called the final run to the checkered flag. His joy at his brother's victory soon gave way to concern for Earnhardt as he watched replays of the crash.

Waltrip and Earnhardt had been bitter rivals on the track in the 1980s but as the years passed, the rivalry and bitterness had given way to a deep respect and close friendship. After the race, Waltrip was taken from the Fox Broadcast booth to the Halifax Medical Center to meet with the Earnhardt family and his brother Michael. Waltrip later gave the invocation at Earnhardt's funeral, and gave the invocation at the following week's race praying for Earnhardt and the promise of moving on from the tragedy.

At the following week's race, Waltrip interviewed NASCAR President Mike Helton for a pre-race segment during the broadcast. This was before NASCAR mandated the use of the HANS device to reduce the risk of catastrophic head and neck injuries, and the "SAFER" (Steel and Foam Energy Reduction) barriers used at all NASCAR tracks today. Waltrip believed that the deaths of Earnhardt, Adam Petty, Kenny Irwin, Jr. and Tony Roper in the previous ten months, all caused by basilar skull fractures incurred in accidents, were too many, and was not shy about asking Helton for an explanation. Helton's responses irritated Waltrip, who was noted by one magazine for "acting a lot more like the next Mike Wallace (of 60 Minutes) than the next John Madden". Waltrip delivered the pre-race invocation for the race in Earnhardt's honor.

As a long-time advocate for motorsports safety, Waltrip then pushed for mandatory head-and-neck restraints, and two weeks later, demonstrated the device during the broadcast at Atlanta Motor Speedway, explaining the benefits and how the device worked. Seven months later, NASCAR mandated the devices after a crash during an ARCA Re/Max Series race, held after qualifying for the UAW-GM Quality 500, killed driver Blaise Alexander.

=== Broadcast style ===
As the cars take the green flag to start each race, Waltrip shouts "Boogity, boogity, boogity, let's go racing boys!" This somewhat nonsensical phrase has become Waltrip's trademark in recent years. (The phrase "boogity, boogity, boogity" also appears in the 1960 doo wop parody "Who Put the Bomp (in the Bomp, Bomp, Bomp)" by Barry Mann.) Humble Pie used the shorter phrase "boogity-boogity" in their 1970 song "Red Light Mama, Red Hot". Ray Stevens used the phrase throughout his 1974 hit, "The Streak". Jerry Reed also said this phrase in the 1977 movie "Smokey and the Bandit." Waltrip was featured on a 1992 home video from Ray Stevens entitled the Amazing Rolling Revue. In this home video Waltrip played the part of the out of control driver of the tour bus/rolling venue. Waltrip explained that the catchphrase arose because, as a driver, he grew tired of hearing his spotter or crew chief say "green, green, green" at the start of every race and wanted to hear something more original. The catchphrase had always been preceded by fellow analyst and former crew chief Larry McReynolds telling Waltrip to "reach up there and pull those belts tight one more time!" until recent years, when McReynolds used the phrase less and less and eventually phased it out altogether.

In 2011, Waltrip stated that his favorite race to have broadcast thus far was the 2010 Aaron's 499. The race lead was exchanged many times among many different drivers rather than the lead being dominated by a single driver. The race ended with driver Kevin Harvick beating driver Jamie McMurray for the win by only the length of a bumper.

Waltrip also lends his unique verbiage to his commentary, speaking of "coop-petetion" when racers work together, but keep each other under a watchful eye, "s'perince" when talking about driving skills of a veteran driver, and "using the chrome horn", when a driver somewhat purposefully bumps a car that's in the way (bumpers on cars used to be made of metal and coated in chrome). In early 2007, Waltrip was nominated for an Emmy in the category "Outstanding Event Analyst".

In March 2011, FOX awarded Waltrip a 2-year contract extension, taking him through 2014, the same year the network's NASCAR contract ended.

In October 2011, Waltrip, Joy, Calvin Fish and Australian Leigh Diffey traveled to Australia to host Speed's coverage of the Supercheap Auto Bathurst 1000 race held at the famous Mount Panorama Circuit. Since Waltrip had not hosted in Australia before, he counted on Australian NASCAR driver Marcos Ambrose to help him learn about the country. During the trip, in regards to hosting, Waltrip and Joy are most famous for helping Ambrose reconcile with a former Bathurst rival Greg Murphy, known for an infamous Lap 145 dustup at the 2005 event following a restart that led to a famous squabble. The interview took place during a safety car session after Murphy had exited the car during a driver change. In the days leading up to the race, Waltrip was taken on a few laps of the track by Supercars Championship driver Jason Bright in Bright's Brad Jones Racing Holden VE Commodore, describing the 6.213 km (3.861 mi) long mountain circuit as a "Geological oddity".

Waltrip announced his retirement from broadcasting on April 4, 2019, at Bristol Motor Speedway citing his desire to spend more time with his wife and grandchildren. His final race in the broadcast booth was the 2019 Toyota/Save Mart 350 at Sonoma Raceway. He has also announced the 2022 Food City Dirt Race.

== Post-Cup Series retirement ==
Waltrip fielded a Toyota sponsored by Japanese industrial giant NTN for his Craftsman Truck Series team in 2004. David Reutimann drove the truck for the team and earned Rookie of the Year honors that year. Waltrip's team expanded to two trucks in 2005. In August 2005, the revived Darrell Waltrip Motorsports won its first race, the Toyota Tundra 200 at Nashville Superspeedway with Reutimann driving. During the 2007 season, A. J. Allmendinger drove the No. 00 Red Bull Toyota but with minimal success. By years end the team was sold to The Racer's Group, a road racing operation.

Waltrip has made occasional starts (three or less each year) in the Craftsman Truck Series and Busch Series since his "retirement" in 2000. Each of these races have been either at Martinsville Speedway or Indianapolis Raceway Park.

Waltrip was the honorary starter at the 2007 Food City 500 and was also the honorary starter for the 2008 Gatorade Duel as Gatorade was one of Waltrip's former sponsors. He also started/completed a Busch Series race at Martinsville in his brother's "Aaron's Dream Machine" after appearing in ads in 2003–2005 begging his brother to let him drive the Aaron's Dream Machine.

In 2009, he appeared in commercials for Rejuvenate Auto with his No. 11 Mountain Dew Chevrolet. Waltrip also appeared in Fox public service announcements for breast cancer awareness.

In 2010 and 2011, Waltrip voiced his support for saving the old Nashville Fairgrounds Speedway, now known as simply the Fairgrounds Speedway, in Nashville. The speedway was first opened in 1904, and hosted a weekly racing series for decades. It is the track where Waltrip first had success at weekly racing events in the 1960s and 70s, winning two track championships and where his first NASCAR victory came May 10, 1975. The speedway and adjacent Tennessee State Fairgrounds is located in an urban area of south Nashville, roughly 2 miles (3.2 km) from its downtown business district. Some residents living close to the speedway have complained of noise and many local politicians have proposed closing the speedway and developing the property.

Waltrip retired as a race commentator for Fox at the end of the 2019 racing season. In March 2011, FOX announced that Waltrip would continue as their lead NASCAR analyst and race commentator through 2014. In May 2015, FOX announced that Jeff Gordon would join him and Mike Joy starting in 2016, replacing their long-time broadcast partner Larry McReynolds.

In 2017, Waltrip announced on his Twitter page that he had undergone a knee replacement from an injury that occurred during the 1991 Pepsi 400. This was also mentioned in his Facebook account.

Waltrip currently owns Honda, Volvo, Subaru, and Buick/GMC automobile dealerships in Franklin, Tennessee, in partnership with his former team owner Rick Hendrick.

In 2026, Waltrip's family announced that he was diagnosed with frontotemporal dementia and suspected chronic traumatic encephalopathy.

== Legacy ==
Waltrip is considered by most in the racing community as a true ambassador to the sport of motor racing. He is a promoter of all forms of racing, especially American stock car auto racing.

As a Fox Sports analyst and broadcaster, Waltrip's opinions, views and comments carry considerable weight with drivers, team owners, fans and NASCAR heads. Waltrip has never been shy about expressing his views, even if controversial.

Waltrip has been a design consultant on some of the newer tracks including the Kentucky Motor Speedway, and the Nashville Superspeedway.

Waltrip has a building which holds many of the race cars he drove throughout his career.

He was inducted into the Motorsports Hall of Fame of America in 2003.

On June 14, 2011, he was selected to the NASCAR Hall of Fame Class of 2012.

Waltrip officially won 84 NASCAR cup races, but yet another, additional, and uncounted "win" was as relief driver for Donnie Allison, at the 1977 Talladega 500. (Allison received credit for the win because he was driving the car when the race started). In that race, Waltrip retired after 106, of 188, laps. Allison sought a relief driver for his No. 1 Hawaiian Tropic sponsored Chevrolet, due to the excess heat of the day, and Waltrip was asked to complete the race in Allison's car. The irony was that Waltrip replaced Allison at the DiGard No. 88 race team just two years previously, which was part of the long lore of the "Allisons vs Waltrip" battle that lasted for more than 16 years.

His 84 wins in the Cup series place him 5th in NASCAR history, one win behind Bobby Allison. In 2011, Jeff Gordon scored his 85th career victory surpassing Waltrip for most wins in the "modern era" of NASCAR. (NASCAR's "modern era" takes into account current scheduling, and the elimination of dirt tracks from scoring statistics; several of Allison's wins came before the start of the "modern era").

== Media appearances ==
=== Film and television ===
Waltrip's entertainment appearances were influenced by his early 1970s work with Ralph Emery in Nashville radio and television, and that led to his work as a fill-in for Emery.

In the 1980s and 1990s, he would substitute for Emery on The Nashville Network's Nashville Now and later hosted himself the network's two successor variety shows, "Music City Tonight" and "Prime Time Country".

Waltrip worked on Days of Thunder as Hendrick Motorsports was a major provider of cars and drivers (he helped hire Bobby Hamilton for the project), and one of his injury substitutes was lead stunt driver Greg Sacks.

Waltrip has twice been a presenter at the GMA (Gospel Music Association) Music Awards, partnering with Kathy Troccoli both times. In 1999, they presented the "Song of the Year" award to Mitch McVicker and Rich Mullins for "My Deliverer". Rich Mullins and Mitch McVicker were thrown from their truck after not wearing seat belts, and Mullins was killed in the accident.

In 2006, Waltrip and Nicole C. Mullen hosted a DirecTV special, Songs of Faith. He provided the voice of Darrell Cartrip, an anthropomorphic car version of himself in all 3 movies of Pixar's Cars franchise. He also appeared in the broadcast booth in the films Talladega Nights: The Ballad of Ricky Bobby, where his phrase was "You know, Larry, there's good days in racing and there's bad days, Ricky Bobby just had himself a bad day". On December 15, 2006, Waltrip played the role of Mother Ginger in the Nashville Ballet's production of The Nutcracker.

He appeared in advertisements for Toyota and Aaron's alongside his brother, Michael, where his gimmick was constantly asking Michael's permission to drive the Aaron's Dream Machine (a nickname for the No. 99 Nationwide Series car). Waltrip has also made a number of appearances in "comedic" segments appearing during his actual Fox broadcasts.

He was featured in two NASCAR Series videos Darrell Waltrip: Quicksilver which explained Waltrip's career and future and he appeared in the NASCAR Video series where he teaches helpful driving tips for driving on the freeway and long-distance drives.

In February 2011, Waltrip appeared in The Day which was a one-hour documentary about the tragic death of Dale Earnhardt at the 2001 Daytona 500.

Waltrip initially believed accidents would happen to him. He was featured in a video testimonial on IamSecond.com talking about his Christian faith in Jesus Christ in which he discussed the meaninglessness of the rest of his career, compared to that relationship.

Waltrip, along with fellow commentators Mike Joy and Jeff Gordon, made a cameo appearance as themselves in the 2017 heist comedy film Logan Lucky.

=== Books and magazines ===
Waltrip has also been successful in the publishing field. In September 1994, he was featured as the cover story in Guideposts.

His autobiography, DW: A Lifetime Going Around in Circles, was a New York Times best-seller when it was released around the 2004 Daytona 500. The book was co-written with Jade Gurss.

In May 2004, Waltrip became the second sports figure to be featured in former NBA player and basketball coach Jay Carty's One-on-One series of devotional books. Darrell Waltrip One-on-One: The Faith that Took Him to the Finish Line is a sixty-day devotional book featuring Waltrip's stories and how they can relate to Christian faith, and Carty's devotionals.

== Motorsports career results ==
=== NASCAR ===
(key) (Bold – Pole position awarded by qualifying time. Italics – Pole position earned by points standings or practice time. * – Most laps led.)

==== Winston Cup Series ====
NASCAR Winston Cup Series results
Year	Team	No.	Make	1	2	3	4	5	6	7	8	9	10	11	12	13	14	15	16	17	18	19	20	21	22	23	24	25	26	27	28	29	30	31	32	33	34	NWCC	Pts	Ref
1972	Darrell Waltrip Motorsports	95	Mercury	RSD	DAY	RCH	ONT	CAR	ATL	BRI	DAR	NWS	MAR	TAL; 38	CLT	DOV	MCH	RSD	TWS	DAY	BRI	TRN	ATL; 8	TAL; 27	MCH	NSV; 3	DAR	RCH	DOV	MAR	NWS	CLT; 6	CAR	TWS				56th	827	
1973	Darrell Waltrip Motorsports	95	Mercury	RSD	DAY; 12	RCH	CAR; 6	BRI; 30	ATL; 33	NWS	DAR; 24	MAR	TAL; 31	NSV; 24	CLT; 7	DOV	TWS; 2	RSD	MCH	DAY; 25	BRI	ATL; 31	TAL; 7															28th	2968.2	
1973	Darrell Waltrip Motorsports	95	Chevy																					NSV; 24			DOV; 20											28th	2968.2	
1973	Bud Moore Engineering	15	Ford																						DAR; 8	RCH; 26		NWS; 30	MAR	CLT; 38	CAR; 27							28th	2968.2	
1974	Darrell Waltrip Motorsports	95	Chevy	RSD	DAY; 7	RCH	CAR; 25	BRI	ATL; 7	DAR; 9	NWS	MAR	TAL; DNQ	NSV; 3	DOV; 20	CLT; 4	RSD	MCH	DAY; 24	BRI	**NSV**; 3	ATL; 4	POC	TAL; 44	MCH	DAR; 2	RCH	DOV; 35	NWS	MAR	CLT; 3	CAR; 5	ONT; 6					19th	609.97	
1975	Darrell Waltrip Motorsports	17	Chevy	RSD	DAY; 26	RCH; 15	CAR; 21	BRI; 6	ATL; 5	**NWS**; 7	DAR; 2	MAR; 2	TAL; 4	**NSV**; 1	DOV; 22	CLT; 4	RSD; 21	MCH; 5	DAY; 4	NSV; 28	POC; 34																	7th	3462	
1975	DiGard Racing	88	Chevy																			TAL; 42	MCH; 7	DAR; 34	DOV; 27	NWS; 3	MAR; 17	CLT; 24	RCH; 1	CAR; 32	BRI; 3	ATL; 36	ONT					7th	3462	
1976	DiGard Racing	88	Chevy	RSD; 21	DAY; 32	CAR; 2	RCH; 24	BRI; 2	ATL; 5	NWS; 22	DAR; 31	MAR; 1*	TAL; 33	NSV; 12	DOV; 30	CLT; 11	RSD; 6	MCH; 29	DAY; 39	NSV; 3	POC; 26	TAL; 37	MCH; 27	**BRI**; 3	DAR; 3	RCH; 4	DOV; 31	**MAR**; 2	**NWS**; 24	CLT; 11	CAR; 3	ATL; 7	ONT; 40					8th	3505	
1977	DiGard Racing	88	Chevy	RSD; 9	DAY; 7	RCH; 2	CAR; 2	ATL; 7	NWS; 7	DAR; 1	BRI; 19	MAR; 21	TAL; 1	**NSV**; 3	DOV; 4	CLT; 6	RSD; 26	MCH; 35	DAY; 2	NSV; 1	**POC**; 3	TAL; 22	MCH; 1	BRI; 2	**DAR**; 6*	RCH; 7	DOV; 5	MAR; 10	NWS; 1	CLT; 5	CAR; 3	ATL; 1	ONT; 29					4th	4498	
1978	DiGard Racing	88	Chevy	RSD; 23	DAY; 28	RCH; 4	CAR; 21	ATL; 35	BRI; 1	DAR; 2	NWS; 1*	MAR; 1*	TAL; 22	DOV; 6*	CLT; 1*	NSV; 26	RSD; 16	MCH; 28*	DAY; 3	NSV; 2	POC; 1*	TAL; 34	MCH; 3	BRI; 3	DAR; 2	**RCH**; 1	DOV; 5	MAR; 2	**NWS**; 2*	CLT; 2	CAR; 3	ATL; 28	ONT; 5					3rd	4362	
1979	DiGard Racing	88	Chevy	RSD; 1*		CAR; 17	RCH; 3	ATL; 3	NWS; 5	BRI; 3	DAR; 1*	**MAR**; 3		NSV; 21	**DOV**; 18	CLT; 1*	TWS; 1*	RSD; 2	MCH; 13		**NSV**; 1*			MCH; 19	BRI; 1	DAR; 11*	RCH; 2	DOV; 29	**MAR**; 11	CLT; 3	NWS; 13	CAR; 6	ATL; 5	ONT; 8				2nd	4819	
1979	DiGard Racing	88	Olds		DAY; 2								**TAL**; 2							DAY; 4			TAL; 1*															2nd	4819	
1979	Al Rudd Auto	22	Chevy																			POC; 7*																2nd	4819	
1980	DiGard Racing	88	Chevy	**RSD**; 1*		**RCH**; 1*	**CAR**; 4	ATL; 28	BRI; 2	DAR; 4	NWS; 12	**MAR**; 1*		NSV; 4	DOV; 20	CLT; 2*	TWS; 4	RSD; 1	MCH; 26		NSV; 4	POC; 26			BRI; 3	**DAR**; 25*	RCH; 6	DOV; 1*	NWS; 2	MAR; 21	CLT; 18	CAR; 3	ATL; 26	ONT; 25*				5th	4239	
1980	DiGard Racing	88	Olds		DAY; 40								TAL; 42							DAY; 31			TAL; 11															5th	4239	
1980	Halpern Enterprises	02	Chevy																					MCH; 4*														5th	4239	
1981	Junior Johnson & Associates	11	Chevy	**RSD**; 17																																		1st	4880	
1981	Junior Johnson & Associates	11	Buick		DAY; 36	RCH; 1*	CAR; 1	ATL; 36	**BRI**; 1*	NWS; 3	DAR; 1*	MAR; 26	TAL; 3	NSV; 2	DOV; 12	CLT; 9	TWS; 30	**RSD**; 1*	**MCH**; 7*	DAY; 10	NSV; 1*	**POC**; 1*	TAL; 2	MCH; 2	**BRI**; 1*	DAR; 2	RCH; 3*	DOV; 2	**MAR**; 1	**NWS**; 1*	**CLT**; 1	**CAR**; 1*	ATL; 2	**RSD**; 6				1st	4880	
1982	Junior Johnson & Associates	11	Buick	DAY; 20	**RCH**; 27	**BRI**; 1*	ATL; 1	CAR; 7*	DAR; 23	**NWS**; 1*	MAR; 5	TAL; 1	**NSV**; 1*	**DOV**; 15	CLT; 22	POC; 13	RSD; 32	MCH; 2	DAY; 36	NSV; 1*	POC; 6	TAL; 1*	MCH; 7	BRI; 1	DAR; 24	RCH; 3	DOV; 1*	**NWS**; 1*	CLT; 14	MAR; 1*	CAR; 1	ATL; 3	**RSD**; 3					1st	4489	
1983	Junior Johnson & Associates	11	Chevy	DAY; 36	RCH; 29	CAR; 3	ATL; 40	DAR; 2	NWS; 1*	MAR; 1*	TAL; 33	**NSV**; 1*	DOV; 2	BRI; 1*	CLT; 4	**RSD**; 7	**POC**; 2	MCH; 4	DAY; 20	NSV; 2	POC; 2	TAL; 2	MCH; 2	BRI; 1*	DAR; 3	**RCH**; 3	DOV; 5	**MAR**; 3	**NWS**; 1*	CLT; 2	CAR; 5	ATL; 9	**RSD**; 6*					2nd	4620	
1984	Junior Johnson & Associates	11	Chevy	DAY; 3	**RCH**; 2*	CAR; 10	ATL; 10	BRI; 1*	NWS; 6	DAR; 1*	MAR; 3	TAL; 38	**NSV**; 1	DOV; 6	CLT; 26	RSD; 11	POC; 6	MCH; 3	DAY; 31	NSV; 2	POC; 22	TAL; 6	MCH; 1	BRI; 21*	DAR; 40	**RCH**; 1*	DOV; 11	MAR; 1*	CLT; 27	**NWS**; 1*	CAR; 4	ATL; 6	RSD; 34					5th	4230	
1985	Junior Johnson & Associates	11	Chevy	DAY; 3	**RCH**; 3*	CAR; 18	ATL; 16	BRI; 23	DAR; 2	**NWS**; 2	**MAR**; 23	TAL; 24	DOV; 5	CLT; 1	**RSD**; 8	POC; 3	MCH; 2	DAY; 3	**POC**; 3	TAL; 9	MCH; 2	BRI; 4*	DAR; 17	RCH; 1	DOV; 2	MAR; 2	NWS; 14	CLT; 4	CAR; 1	ATL; 3	RSD; 7							1st	4292	
1986	Junior Johnson & Associates	11	Chevy	DAY; 3	RCH; 5	CAR; 5	ATL; 4	BRI; 3	DAR; 2	NWS; 4	MAR; 27	TAL; 34	DOV; 5	CLT; 5	**RSD**; 1	POC; 40	MCH; 5	DAY; 4	POC; 4	TAL; 25	GLN; 2	MCH; 3	BRI; 1*	DAR; 5	RCH; 29	DOV; 14	MAR; 4	NWS; 1	CLT; 9	CAR; 3	ATL; 39	RSD; 4						2nd	4180	
1987	Hendrick Motorsports	17	Chevy	DAY; 8	CAR; 7	RCH; 20	ATL; 6	DAR; 10	NWS; 21	BRI; 12	MAR; 21	TAL; 11	CLT; 5	DOV; 7	POC; 13	RSD; 30	MCH; 7	DAY; 4	POC; 19	TAL; 4	GLN; 11	MCH; 17	BRI; 21	DAR; 10	RCH; 2	DOV; 10	MAR; 1	NWS; 12	CLT; 9	CAR; 3	RSD; 6	ATL; 18						4th	3911	
1988	Hendrick Motorsports	17	Chevy	DAY; 11	RCH; 4	CAR; 24	ATL; 3	DAR; 24	BRI; 23	NWS; 14	MAR; 5	TAL; 37	CLT; 1	DOV; 23	RSD; 28	POC; 6	MCH; 8	**DAY**; 5	POC; 5	**TAL**; 33*	GLN; 20	MCH; 17	BRI; 7	DAR; 4	RCH; 8	DOV; 17	MAR; 1	CLT; 2	NWS; 12	CAR; 31	PHO; 13	ATL; 5						7th	3764	
1989	Hendrick Motorsports	17	Chevy	DAY; 1	CAR; 29	ATL; 1	RCH; 7	DAR; 36	BRI; 2	NWS; 8	MAR; 1*	TAL; 5	CLT; 1	DOV; 9	SON; 38	POC; 32	MCH; 3	DAY; 19	POC; 4	TAL; 2	GLN; 16	MCH; 37	BRI; 1*	DAR; 22	RCH; 6	DOV; 18	MAR; 1	CLT; 14	NWS; 20	CAR; 3	PHO; 4	ATL; 5						4th	3971	
1990	Hendrick Motorsports	17	Chevy	DAY; 14	RCH; 12	CAR; 6	ATL; 26	DAR; 11	BRI; 9*	NWS; 2	MAR; 4	TAL; 10	CLT; 22	DOV; 19	SON; 33	POC; 8	MCH; 15	DAY; INQ^{†}	POC; 20	TAL	GLN	MCH	BRI	DAR	RCH; 3	DOV; 19	MAR; 19	NWS; 7	CLT; 9	CAR; 8	PHO; 4	ATL; 5						20th	3013	
1991	Darrell Waltrip Motorsports	17	Chevy	DAY; 24	RCH; 7	CAR; 9	ATL; 9	DAR; 25	BRI; 6	NWS; 1	MAR; 3	TAL; 2	CLT; 8	DOV; 7	SON; 25	POC; 1	MCH; 7	DAY; 32	POC; 29	TAL; 15	GLN; 6	MCH; 32	BRI; 8	DAR; 24	RCH; 7	DOV; 19	MAR; 15	NWS; 20	CLT; 9	CAR; 32	PHO; 2	ATL; 10						8th	3711	
1992	Darrell Waltrip Motorsports	17	Chevy	DAY; 26	CAR; 10	RCH; 5	ATL; 39	DAR; 24	BRI; 25	NWS; 15	**MAR**; 3	TAL; 29	CLT; 38	DOV; 5*	SON; 8	POC; 13	MCH; 2	DAY; 13	POC; 1	TAL; 23	GLN; 12	MCH; 2	BRI; 1*	DAR; 1	RCH; 3	DOV; 20	MAR; 15	NWS; 9	CLT; 34	CAR; 22	PHO; 3	ATL; 23						9th	3659	
1993	Darrell Waltrip Motorsports	17	Chevy	DAY; 18	CAR; 30	RCH; 8	ATL; 35	DAR; 16	BRI; 6	NWS; 5	MAR; 4	TAL; 26	SON; 35	CLT; 11	DOV; 24	POC; 30	MCH; 19	DAY; 13	NHA; 19	POC; 10	TAL; 37	GLN; 14	MCH; 13	BRI; 29	DAR; 28	RCH; 7	DOV; 3	MAR; 18	NWS; 11	CLT; 19	CAR; 7	PHO; 7	ATL; 3					13th	3479	
1994	Darrell Waltrip Motorsports	17	Chevy	DAY; 28	CAR; 23	RCH; 16	ATL; 3	DAR; 26	BRI; 15	NWS; 28	MAR; 4	TAL; 14	SON; 18	CLT; 30	DOV; 6	POC; 30	MCH; 10	DAY; 25	NHA; 23	POC; 28	TAL; 24	IND; 6	GLN; 7	MCH; 9	BRI; 4	DAR; 13	RCH; 10	DOV; 3	MAR; 10	NWS; 13	CLT; 9	CAR; 23	PHO; 10	ATL; 21				9th	3688	
1995	Darrell Waltrip Motorsports	17	Chevy	DAY; 32	CAR; 38	RCH; 7	ATL; 34	DAR; 21	BRI; 3	NWS; 10	MAR; 4	TAL; 4	SON; 35	CLT; 18	DOV; 20	POC; 42	MCH; 26	DAY; 34	NHA; 17	POC; 36	TAL; 43	IND; 17	GLN; 8	MCH; 15	BRI; 4	DAR; 40	RCH; 22	DOV; 36	MAR; 8	NWS; 14	CLT; 34	CAR; 12	PHO; 38	**ATL**; 16				19th	3078	
1996	Darrell Waltrip Motorsports	17	Chevy	DAY; 29	CAR; 16	RCH; 27	ATL; 32	DAR; 34	BRI; 26	NWS; 25	MAR; 16	TAL; 21	SON; 14	CLT; 13	DOV; 39	POC; 30	MCH; 25	DAY; 26	NHA; 37	POC; 40	TAL; 9	IND; 40	GLN; 18	MCH; 22	BRI; 11	DAR; 32	RCH; 22	DOV; 39	MAR; 23	NWS; 27	CLT; 42	CAR; 21	PHO; 10	ATL; 37				29th	2657	
1997	Darrell Waltrip Motorsports	17	Chevy	DAY; 10	CAR; 32	RCH; 16	ATL; 16	DAR; 11	TEX; 43	BRI; 25	MAR; 9	SON; 5	TAL; 32	CLT; 21	DOV; 28	POC; 7	MCH; 24	CAL; 15	DAY; 14	NHA; 33	POC; 26	IND; 14	GLN; 18	MCH; 15	BRI; 42	DAR; 26	RCH; 32	NHA; 32	DOV; 32	MAR; 24	CLT; DNQ	TAL; 37	CAR; 29	PHO; 12	ATL; 40			26th	2942	
1998	Darrell Waltrip Motorsports	17	Chevy	DAY; 33	CAR; 41	LVS; 35	ATL; 40	DAR; 30																														24th	2957	
1998	Dale Earnhardt, Inc.	1	Chevy						BRI; 23	TEX; 36	MAR; 40	TAL; 15	CAL; 5	CLT; 17	DOV; 20	RCH; 32	MCH; 12	POC; 6	SON; 13	NHA; 13	POC; 13																	24th	2957	
1998	Tyler Jet Motorsports	35	Chevy																			IND; 13	GLN; 25															24th	2957	
1998	Tyler Jet Motorsports	35	Pontiac																					MCH; 25	BRI; 27	NHA; 32	DAR; 38	RCH; 18	DOV; 21	MAR; 21	CLT; 22	TAL; 23	DAY; 28	PHO; 31	CAR; 32	ATL; 38		24th	2957	
1999	Haas-Carter Motorsports	66	Ford	DAY; 21	CAR; 27	LVS; 25	ATL; 20	DAR; 41	TEX; 25	BRI; 32	MAR; 12	TAL; 26	CAL; 15	RCH; 25	CLT; 43	DOV; DNQ	MCH; 39	POC; 34	SON; 12	DAY; 38	NHA; 33	POC; 25	IND; 42	GLN; 15	MCH; DNQ	BRI; 14	DAR; 29	RCH; 32	NHA; DNQ	DOV; DNQ	MAR; 23	CLT; DNQ	TAL; DNQ	CAR; 34	PHO; 26	HOM; 43	ATL; DNQ	37th	2158	
2000	Haas-Carter Motorsports	66	Ford	DAY; 32	CAR; 39	LVS; 38	ATL; 31	DAR; 43	BRI; 31	TEX; 24	MAR; 43	TAL; 26	CAL; 29	RCH; DNQ	CLT; DNQ	DOV; 33	MCH; DNQ	POC; DNQ	SON; 28	DAY; 27	NHA; 33	POC; 22	IND; 11	GLN; 20	MCH; DNQ	BRI; 42	DAR; 42	RCH; DNQ	NHA; 29	DOV; 31	MAR; 27	CLT; 30	TAL; 35	CAR; 37	PHO; 33	HOM; 36	ATL; 34	36th	1981	
2000	Mansion Motorsports	85	Ford												CLT; 36																							36th	1981	
^{†} - Qualified but replaced by Jimmy Horton

===== Daytona 500 =====
Year	Team	Manufacturer	Start	Finish
1973	Darrell Waltrip Motorsports	Mercury	11	12
1974	Darrell Waltrip Motorsports	Chevrolet	11	7
1975	Darrell Waltrip Motorsports	Chevrolet	33	26
1976	DiGard Racing	Chevrolet	4	32
1977	DiGard Racing	Chevrolet	10	7
1978	DiGard Racing	Chevrolet	8	28
1979	DiGard Racing	Oldsmobile	4	2
1980	DiGard Racing	Oldsmobile	7	40
1981	Junior Johnson & Associates	Buick	2	36
1982	Junior Johnson & Associates	Buick	2	20
1983	Junior Johnson & Associates	Chevrolet	31	36
1984	Junior Johnson & Associates	Chevrolet	26	3
1985	Junior Johnson & Associates	Chevrolet	3	3
1986	Junior Johnson & Associates	Chevrolet	6	3
1987	Hendrick Motorsports	Chevrolet	5	8
1988	Hendrick Motorsports	Chevrolet	4	11
1989	Hendrick Motorsports	Chevrolet	2	**1**
1990	Hendrick Motorsports	Chevrolet	9	14
1991	Darrell Waltrip Motorsports	Chevrolet	10	24
1992	Darrell Waltrip Motorsports	Chevrolet	12	26
1993	Darrell Waltrip Motorsports	Chevrolet	26	18
1994	Darrell Waltrip Motorsports	Chevrolet	32	28
1995	Darrell Waltrip Motorsports	Chevrolet	5	32
1996	Darrell Waltrip Motorsports	Chevrolet	40	29
1997	Darrell Waltrip Motorsports	Chevrolet	22	10
1998	Darrell Waltrip Motorsports	Chevrolet	43	33
1999	Haas-Carter Motorsports	Ford	43	21
2000	Haas-Carter Motorsports	Ford	43	32

==== Busch Series ====
NASCAR Busch Series results
Year	Team	No.	Make	1	2	3	4	5	6	7	8	9	10	11	12	13	14	15	16	17	18	19	20	21	22	23	24	25	26	27	28	29	30	31	32	33	34	35	NBSC	Pts
1982	Darrell Waltrip Motorsports	47	Pontiac	DAY	RCH	BRI	MAR	DAR	HCY	SBO	CRW	RCH	LGY	DOV	HCY	CLT; 6	ASH	HCY	SBO	CAR	CRW	SBO	HCY	LGY	IRP	BRI	HCY	RCH	MAR										78th	330
1982	Darrell Waltrip Motorsports	17	Pontiac																											CLT; 1	HCY	MAR							78th	330
1983	Darrell Waltrip Motorsports	17	Pontiac	DAY; 1	RCH	CAR	HCY	MAR	NWS	SBO	GPS	LGY	DOV	BRI	CLT	SBO	HCY	ROU	SBO	ROU	CRW	ROU	SBO	HCY	LGY	IRP; 2	GPS	BRI	HCY	DAR	RCH	NWS	SBO	MAR	ROU	CLT; 11	HCY	MAR	52nd	480
1984	Darrell Waltrip Motorsports	17	Pontiac	DAY; 1	RCH	CAR	HCY	MAR	DAR	ROU	NSH; 21	LGY	MLW; 25	DOV	CLT; 2	SBO	HCY	ROU	SBO	ROU	HCY	IRP; 3	LGY	SBO	BRI	DAR	RCH	NWS	CLT; 1	HCY	CAR	MAR							53rd	345
1985	Darrell Waltrip Motorsports	17	Olds	DAY; 3	CAR	HCY																																	28th	977
1985	Darrell Waltrip Motorsports	17	Chevy				BRI; 1	MAR	DAR; 11	SBO	LGY	DOV; 1	CLT	SBO	HCY	ROU	IRP; 4	SBO	LGY	HCY	MLW; 17	BRI	DAR; 1	RCH; 5	NWS	ROU	CLT	HCY	CAR	MAR									28th	977
1986	Darrell Waltrip Motorsports	17	Olds	DAY; 3	CAR	HCY	MAR																																22nd	1743
1986	Darrell Waltrip Motorsports	17	Chevy					BRI; 6				**JFC**; 1						**IRP**; 8	SBO		OXF; 35	SBO	HCY	LGY	ROU														22nd	1743
1986	Darrell Waltrip Motorsports	17	Pontiac						DAR; 1	SBO	LGY		DOV; 1	CLT; 30	SBO	HCY	ROU			RAL; 1							DAR; 21	RCH	DOV	MAR	ROU	CLT; 2	CAR	MAR					22nd	1743
1986	Lindy White Racing	1	Chevy																							BRI; 3													22nd	1743
1987	Darrell Waltrip Motorsports	17	Chevy	DAY; 2	HCY	MAR	DAR; 4	BRI	LGY	SBO	CLT; 2	DOV	IRP; 34	ROU	JFC; 24	OXF	SBO	HCY	RAL; 5	LGY	ROU	BRI; 26	JFC; 5	DAR; 7	RCH	DOV	MAR	CLT; 2	CAR; 29	MAR									29th	1439
1988	Darrell Waltrip Motorsports	17	Chevy	DAY; 3	HCY	CAR	MAR	DAR; 10	BRI	LNG	NZH	SBO	NSH; 1	CLT; 37	DOV; 31	ROU	LAN	LVL; 16	MYB	OXF	SBO	HCY	LNG	IRP; 5	ROU	BRI; 29	DAR	RCH	DOV	MAR	CLT; 5	CAR; 4	MAR						29th	1262
1989	Darrell Waltrip Motorsports	17	Chevy	DAY; 1	CAR	MAR	HCY	DAR; 37	BRI	NZH	SBO	LAN	NSH	CLT; 2	DOV; 37	ROU	LVL	VOL	MYB	SBO	HCY	DUB	IRP; 32	ROU	BRI	DAR	RCH; 28	DOV; 5	MAR	CLT; 31	CAR; 4	MAR							36th	985
1990	Darrell Waltrip Motorsports	17	Chevy	**DAY**; 30	RCH	CAR	MAR	HCY	DAR; 6	BRI	LAN	SBO	NZH	HCY	CLT; 29	DOV; 36	ROU	VOL	MYB	OXF	NHA	SBO	DUB	IRP	ROU	BRI	DAR	RCH	DOV	MAR	CLT	NHA; 34	CAR; 15	MAR					50th	533
1991	Darrell Waltrip Motorsports	17	Chevy	DAY; 32	RCH; 11	CAR; 35	MAR	VOL	HCY	DAR; 24	BRI	LAN	SBO	NZH	CLT; 6	DOV; 3	ROU	HCY	MYB	GLN	OXF	NHA	SBO	DUB	IRP; 29	ROU	BRI	DAR; 6	RCH; 6	DOV	CLT; 6	NHA	CAR; 15	MAR					30th	1305
1992	Darrell Waltrip Motorsports	17	Chevy	DAY; 8	CAR	RCH; 4	ATL; 38	MAR	DAR	BRI	HCY; 5	LAN	DUB	NZH	CLT; 34	DOV	ROU	MYB	GLN	VOL	NHA	TAL; 18	IRP	ROU	MCH; 26	NHA	BRI	DAR	RCH; 2	DOV	CLT; 27	MAR	CAR; 4	HCY					36th	1173
1993	Darrell Waltrip Motorsports	17	Chevy	DAY; 7	CAR	RCH; 30	DAR	BRI	HCY	ROU	MAR	NZH	CLT	DOV	MYB	GLN	MLW; 12	TAL; 16	IRP	MCH; 37	NHA	BRI	DAR	RCH; DNQ	DOV	ROU	CLT; DNQ	MAR	CAR	HCY	ATL								50th	513
1995	Labonte Motorsports	11	Chevy	DAY	CAR	RCH	ATL	**NSH**; 8	DAR	BRI	HCY	NHA	NZH	CLT	DOV	MYB	GLN	MLW	TAL	SBO	IRP	MCH	BRI	DAR	RCH	DOV	CLT	CAR	HOM										82nd	142
2006	Michael Waltrip Racing	99	Dodge	DAY	CAL	MXC	LVS	ATL	BRI	TEX	NSH	PHO	TAL	RCH	DAR	CLT	DOV	NSH	KEN	MLW	DAY	CHI	NHA	MAR; 28	GTY	IRP	GLN	MCH	BRI	CAL	RCH	DOV	KAN	CLT	MEM	TEX	PHO	HOM	122nd	79

==== Craftsman Truck Series ====
NASCAR Craftsman Truck Series results
Year	Team	No.	Make	1	2	3	4	5	6	7	8	9	10	11	12	13	14	15	16	17	18	19	20	21	22	23	24	25	NCTS	Pts
1995	Ken Schrader Racing	52	Chevy	PHO	TUS	SGS	MMR	POR	EVG	I70	LVL	BRI	MLW	CNS	HPT; 6	IRP	FLM												41st	450
1995	Darrell Waltrip Motorsports	17	Chevy															RCH; 8	MAR; 35	NWS; 21	SON	MMR	PHO						41st	450
1996	Darrell Waltrip Motorsports	5	Chevy	HOM	PHO	POR	EVG	TUS	CNS	HPT; 11	BRI	NZH	MLW	LVL	I70	IRP	FLM	GLN	NSV	RCH; 9	NHA	MAR; 5	NWS; 10	SON	MMR	PHO	LVS; 20		37th	660
2002	HT Motorsports	17	Dodge	DAY	DAR	MAR; 34	GTY	PPR	DOV	TEX	MEM	MLW	KAN	KEN	NHA	MCH	IRP; 6	NSH	RCH	TEX	SBO	LVS	CAL	PHO	HOM				62nd	211
2003	Michael Waltrip Racing	17	Chevy	DAY	DAR	MMR	MAR; 7	CLT	DOV	TEX	MEM	MLW	KAN	KEN	GTY	MCH	IRP; 29	NSH	BRI	RCH	NHA	CAL	LVS	SBO	TEX	MAR; 7	PHO	HOM	59th	368
2004	Darrell Waltrip Motorsports	11	Toyota	DAY	ATL	MAR; 24	MFD	CLT	DOV	TEX	MEM	MLW	KAN	KEN	GTY	MCH	IRP; 28	NSH	BRI	RCH	NHA	LVS	CAL	TEX	MAR; DNQ	PHO	DAR	HOM	93rd	91
2005	Darrell Waltrip Motorsports	11	Toyota	DAY	CAL	ATL	MAR; DNQ	GTY	MFD	CLT	DOV	TEX	MCH	MLW	KAN	KEN	MEM	IRP	NSH	BRI	RCH	NHA	LVS						73rd	124
2005	Darrell Waltrip Motorsports	12	Toyota																					MAR; 13	ATL	TEX	PHO	HOM	73rd	124

=== International Race of Champions ===
(key) (Bold – Pole position. * – Most laps led.)

International Race of Champions results
Year	Make	Q1	Q2	Q3	1	2	3	4	Pos.	Points	Ref
1977−78	Chevy				**MCH**; 3	RSD; 5	RSD; 4	**DAY**; 2	3rd	N/A	
1978−79	Chevy	MCH; 8	MCH	RSD	RSD	ATL			13th	N/A	
1979−80	Chevy	MCH; 3	MCH	RSD	RSD; 1	**ATL**; 6			2nd	32	
1984	Chevy				MCH; 4	CLE; 5	TAL; 1	**MCH**; 6	3rd	52	
1985	Chevy				DAY; 1	MOH; 7	TAL; C	**MCH**; 4	2nd	45	
1986	Chevy				DAY; 7	MOH; 3	TAL; 4	GLN; 3	5th	48	
1987	Chevy				**DAY**; 3	MOH; 12	MCH; 2	GLN; 10	5th	42	
1990	Dodge				TAL; 4	CLE	MCH; 12		9th	23	
1997	Pontiac				DAY; 11	CLT; 11	CAL; 11	MCH; 11	11th	18	

== See also ==
- Michael Waltrip
- Darrell Waltrip Motorsports

Sporting positions
Preceded by Dale Earnhardt; Terry Labonte	NASCAR Cup Series Champion; 1981, 1982; 1985	Succeeded by Bobby Allison; Dale Earnhardt
Achievements
Preceded by Dale Earnhardt	Busch Clash Winner; 1981	Succeeded by Bobby Allison
Preceded by Inaugural race	The Winston Winner; 1985	Succeeded by Bill Elliott
Preceded by Bobby Allison	Daytona 500 Winner; 1989	Succeeded by Derrike Cope
Preceded by Harry Gant	Southern 500 Winner; 1992	Succeeded by Mark Martin
Preceded by Donnie Allison	Snowball Derby Winner; 1976	Succeeded by Ronnie Sanders
Awards
Preceded by Bill Elliott	NASCAR's Most Popular Driver Award; 1989, 1990	Succeeded by Bill Elliott
