= Whitesville, Kentucky =

- City
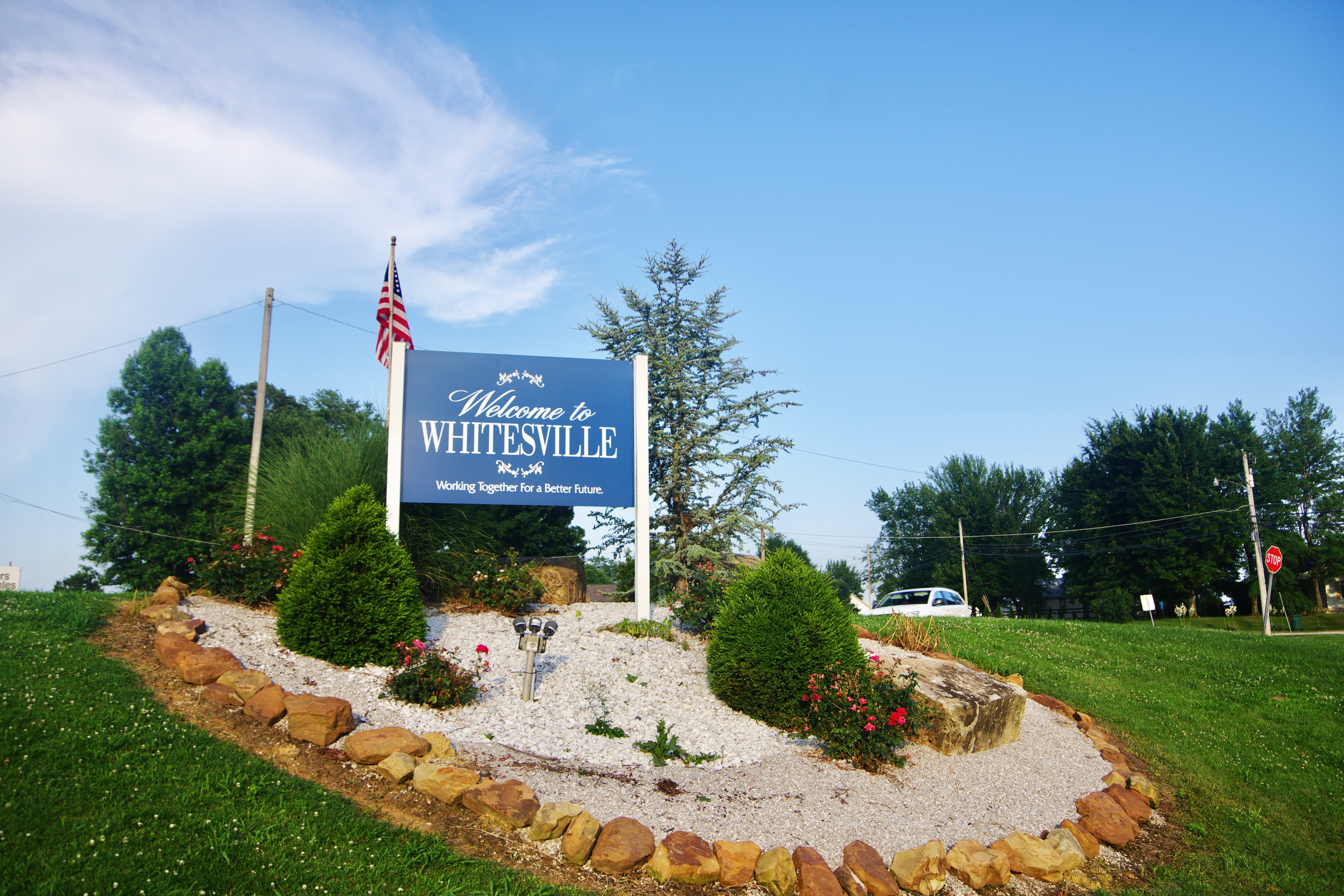
- Welcome sign along KY 54

- Location of Whitesville in Daviess County, Kentucky.
- Coordinates: 37°40′59″N 86°52′14″W
- Country: United States
- State: Kentucky
- County: Daviess

Area
  - Total: 0.43 sq mi (1.12 km^{2})
  - Land: 0.43 sq mi (1.12 km^{2})
  - Water: 0 sq mi (0.00 km^{2})
- Elevation: 499 ft (152 m)

Population (2020)
  - Total: 580
  - Density: 1,345/sq mi (519.5/km^{2})
- Time zone: UTC-6 (Central (CST))
  - Summer (DST): UTC-5 (CDT)
- ZIP code: 42378
- Area codes: 270 & 364
- FIPS code: 21-82830
- GNIS feature ID: 0506683
- Website: cityofwhitesvilleky.org

Whitesville is a home rule-class city in Daviess County, Kentucky, United States. The population was 580 as of the 2020 Census, up from 552 as of the 2010 census. It is included in the Owensboro, Kentucky Metropolitan Statistical Area. The city was founded in 1844 by Dr. William White, and named for him. The current mayor of Whitesville is Patsy Mayfield.

== Geography ==
Whitesville is located in southeastern Daviess County at 37°40′59″N 86°52′14″W (37.683181, -86.870587). Kentucky Route 54 passes through the center of town, leading northwest 15 miles (24 km) to Owensboro, the county seat, and southeast 39 miles (63 km) to Leitchfield.

According to the United States Census Bureau, Whitesville has a total area of 0.42 square miles (1.08 km^{2}), all of it land.

== Demographics ==
Historical population
| Census | Pop. | Note | %± |
|---|---|---|---|
| 1870 | 257 | | — |
| 1880 | 309 | | 20.2% |
| 1890 | 398 | | 28.8% |
| 1900 | 449 | | 12.8% |
| 1910 | 452 | | 0.7% |
| 1920 | 437 | | −3.3% |
| 1930 | 104 | | −76.2% |
| 1940 | 543 | | 422.1% |
| 1950 | 723 | | 33.1% |
| 1960 | 713 | | −1.4% |
| 1970 | 752 | | 5.5% |
| 1980 | 788 | | 4.8% |
| 1990 | 682 | | −13.5% |
| 2000 | 632 | | −7.3% |
| 2010 | 552 | | −12.7% |
| 2020 | 580 | | 5.1% |
U.S. Decennial Census

As of the census of 2000, there were 632 people, 250 households, and 175 families residing in the city. The population density was 1,411.0 inhabitants per square mile (544.8/km^{2}). There were 260 housing units at an average density of 580.5 per square mile (224.1/km^{2}). The racial makeup of the city was 98.10% White, 0.79% African American, 0.16% Asian, and 0.95% from two or more races. Hispanic or Latino of any race were 0.32% of the population.

There were 250 households, out of which 36.0% had children under the age of 18 living with them, 52.8% were married couples living together, 14.0% had a female householder with no husband present, and 30.0% were non-families. 28.0% of all households were made up of individuals, and 18.4% had someone living alone who was 65 years of age or older. The average household size was 2.53 and the average family size was 3.09.

In the city, the population was spread out, with 28.2% under the age of 18, 7.6% from 18 to 24, 24.2% from 25 to 44, 19.9% from 45 to 64, and 20.1% who were 65 years of age or older. The median age was 37 years. For every 100 females, there were 88.1 males. For every 100 females age 18 and over, there were 81.6 males.

The median income for a household in the city was $25,655, and the median income for a family was $28,667. Males had a median income of $31,000 versus $17,917 for females. The per capita income for the city was $13,477. About 13.4% of families and 12.8% of the population were below the poverty line, including 9.5% of those under age 18 and 16.0% of those age 65 or over.

== Places of interest ==
Whitesville is home to Kentucky Motor Speedway, a 3/8 mile short-track facility built in 1960, with an infield figure 8 track crossover added in 1981. Several NASCAR greats, such as Darrell Waltrip, Michael Waltrip, and Jeremy Mayfield, got their start in racing at the speedway. The facility was idle from 2005 to 2008 due to bankruptcy issues, but reopened on April 19, 2009. It was idle again in 2022 and 2023.

== Notable people ==
- Private David P. Nash, Medal of Honor recipient for his service during the Vietnam War
