= David P. Nash =

David Paul Nash
- Army Medal of Honor
- Born: November 3, 1948; Whitesville, Kentucky, U.S.
- Died: December 29, 1968 (aged 20); Giao Duc District, Dinh Tuong Province, Republic of Vietnam
- Burial place: Saint Mary of the Woods Cemetery Whitesville, Kentucky
- Military career
- Allegiance: United States of America
- Branch: United States Army
- Rank: Private First Class
- Units: 39th Infantry Regiment, 9th Infantry Division
- Conflicts: Vietnam War †
- Awards: Medal of Honor; Bronze Star; Purple Heart

David Paul Nash (November 3, 1948 – December 29, 1968) was a United States Army soldier and a recipient of the United States military's highest decoration—the Medal of Honor—for his actions in the Vietnam War.

== Biography ==
David Paul Nash, known as "Paulie" to his friends, was the son of Ishmael Worth Nash (1915–1980) and Mary Stella Nash née Howard (born 1925) and had six brothers and one sister. David Paul Nash was "a typical country boy who loved to fish and hunt, was not afraid of hard work, and raised a tobacco crop with his older brother ... was a member of St. Mary's of the Woods Catholic Church, where he was an altar boy ... after schooling at St. Mary's High School, was drafted into the United States Army and ... had no second thoughts about serving his country in Vietnam; he expressed to friends and family that it was the right thing to do ...".

Nash joined the Army from Whitesville, Kentucky, and by December 29, 1968, was serving as a private first class in Company B, 2nd Battalion, 39th Infantry Regiment, 9th Infantry Division. On that day, in Giao Duc District, Dinh Tuong Province, Republic of Vietnam, Nash smothered the blast of an enemy-thrown grenade with his body, sacrificing his life to protect his fellow soldiers.

Nash, aged 20 at his death, was buried in Saint Mary of the Woods Cemetery in his birth city of Whitesville, Kentucky.

The section of Kentucky Highway 54 which runs through Whitesville is named "The David P. 'Paulie' Nash Memorial Highway".

== Medal of Honor citation ==
Private Nash's official Medal of Honor citation reads:

For conspicuous gallantry and intrepidity in action at the risk of his life above and beyond the call of duty. Pfc. Nash distinguished himself while serving as a grenadier with Company B, in Giao Duc District. When an ambush patrol of which he was a member suddenly came under intense attack before reaching its destination, he was the first to return the enemy fire. Taking an exposed location, Pfc. Nash suppressed the hostile fusillade with a rapid series of rounds from his grenade launcher, enabling artillery fire to be adjusted on the enemy. After the foe had been routed, his small element continued to the ambush site where he established a position with 3 fellow soldiers on a narrow dike. Shortly past midnight, while Pfc. Nash and a comrade kept watch and the 2 other men took their turn sleeping, an enemy grenade wounded 2 soldiers in the adjacent position. Seconds later, Pfc. Nash saw another grenade land only a few feet from his own position. Although he could have escaped harm by rolling down the other side of the dike, he shouted a warning to his comrades and leaped upon the lethal explosive. Absorbing the blast with his body, he saved the lives of the 3 men in the area at the sacrifice of his life. By his gallantry at the cost of his life are in the highest traditions of the military service, Pfc. Nash has reflected great credit on himself, his unit, and the U.S. Army.

== See also ==
- List of Medal of Honor recipients
- List of Medal of Honor recipients for the Vietnam War
