= L. W. Wright =

American confidence trickster (1949–2024)

- Born: Larry Earnest Wright; April 17, 1949; Richlands, Virginia, U.S.
- Died: January 27, 2024 (aged 74); Nashville, Tennessee, U.S.
- Known for: Criminal Fraud, Confidence Scamming

NASCAR Cup Series career
- 1 race run over 1 year
- Best finish: 122nd (1982)
- First race: 1982 Winston 500 (Talladega)
Wins	Top tens	Poles
0	0	0

Larry Earnest Wright (April 17, 1949 – January 27, 2024), better known under alias L. W. Wright, was an American confidence trickster and racing driver. In 1982, he posed as a stock car racing driver to compete in the Winston 500, a NASCAR Winston Cup Series race at Talladega Superspeedway.

== Early life ==
Larry Earnest Wright was born on April 17, 1949, and grew up in Richlands, Virginia, United States. He had seven siblings, five brothers and two sisters. According to Wright, he dropped out of school in the seventh grade, to help his family financially, after his father, a coal miner, broke his back at work. At seventeen, according to his statements, he was illegally rum-running moonshine.

In an interview, Wright stated that he volunteered for the United States Army to fight in the Vietnam War but was never shipped to the front lines. On April 18, 1968, his older brother, Grover C. Wright Jr., was killed in action during the conflict, in Biên Hòa Province, South Vietnam (now part of Vietnam). Larry cited it as a reason why he was never shipped there. Despite that, in another interview, he falsely stated that he served three tours in Vietnam War, in the United States Army Special Forces.

== Career ==
=== 1982 Winston 500 ===
In April 1982, William Dunaway of Hendersonville, Tennessee, contacted a Nashville newspaper to promote a driver named L. W. Wright, an alias of Larry Wright, who declared he was entering the Winston 500 with Music City Racing. Claiming to be a 33-year-old driver with 43 NASCAR Busch Grand National Series starts, Wright also announced country artists Merle Haggard, T. G. Sheppard, and Waylon Jennings were to sponsor his team. To participate in the race, Wright submitted a check worth $115 to NASCAR for a competition license; although sanctioning body officials were skeptical of his background, right-to-work laws required NASCAR to allow him to race if he could pay for the license and $100 entry fee and provide a capable car. As part of Music City Racing, Lloyd Barber and Rick Wright also applied for drivers permits, while Dunaway, Freddy Case, Willis Judd, Michael Smith, and Ellis White requested mechanics licenses.

Wright approached B. W. "Bernie" Terrell, head of Nashville-based Space Age Marketing, for assistance in buying and sponsoring a car. In addition to $30,000 to purchase the vehicle, Terrell gave him a semi-trailer truck and $7,500 to cover expenses. He eventually bought a Chevrolet Monte Carlo from Sterling Marlin for $20,700 with $17,000 in cash and a check for the remainder; suspicious of the excessively high money spending, Marlin followed Wright to Talladega to serve as his crew chief. Other payments included $1,500–1,800 to Goodyear for tires, $1,200 to driver Travis Tiller for parts, and $168 to the Southern Textile Association's Wayne Wilson for racing jackets.

After Wright conducted a newspaper interview to promote his entry, Sheppard denied his involvement in the effort, with Nashville Speedway co-owner and Sheppard's tax attorney and fellow Winston Cup driver Gary Baker adding he "had never even heard of the guy". When he was questioned at Talladega about Sheppard and his racing career, Wright claimed the Sheppard sponsorship was "premature" and admitted he had participated in Sportsman class races that took place at Grand National tracks, but not in a Grand National race. Marlin expressed further suspicion at Wright's behavior at the track, who regularly asked "questions any driver should have known". Wright crashed in practice, but was able to repair his car and qualified 36th. In the race, he was ordered to exit after 13 laps for being too slow and finished 39th. He received $1,545 in prize money but no points in the Cup standings as a late entrant.

=== Aftermath ===
Following the race, Wright disappeared and left the car at the speedway, where Terrell recovered it. While missing, he was announced as having failed to qualify for the next race, the Cracker Barrel Country Store 420 at Nashville Speedway. It was later revealed that the checks which Wright gave were invalid; South Central Bell and Wright's landlord received bad checks worth $700 and $4,500, respectively, while United Trappers Marketing Association owner Dean McIntire lost over $10,000 to Wright. Marlin commented the bounced check "didn't really surprise me. I sort of expected it."

NASCAR arranged for arrest warrants, while Terrell hired a private investigator to search for Wright. Wright was referred to as the "D. B. Cooper of NASCAR" by a Racing-Reference writer and in a documentary aired on NASCAR Race Hub for his immediate disappearance and unknown whereabouts.

== Personal life ==
On April 29, 2022, Rick Houston of the Scene Vault Podcast announced that they had found Wright, releasing a podcast interview with him on May 2, 2022, the 40th anniversary of Wright's infamous race and disappearance. The podcast announcement included an audio clip of Wright identifying himself.

== Later arrest and death ==
On February 13, 2023, Wright was arrested in Knox County, Tennessee, by the United States Marshals Fugitive Task Force. He was charged with theft, burglary, and evading arrest. He died of colon cancer in Nashville, Tennessee, on January 27, 2024, at the age of 74.

== Motorsports career results ==
=== NASCAR ===
==== Winston Cup Series ====
NASCAR Winston Cup Series results
Year	Team	No.	Make	1	2	3	4	5	6	7	8	9	10	11	12	13	14	15	16	17	18	19	20	21	22	23	24	25	26	27	28	29	30	NWCC	Pts	Ref
1982	Music City Racing	34	Chevy	DAY	RCH	BRI	ATL	CAR	DAR	NWS	MAR	TAL; 39	NSV; DNQ	DOV	CLT	POC	RSD	MCH	DAY	NSV	POC	TAL	MCH	BRI	DAR	RCH	DOV	NWS	CLT	MAR	CAR	ATL	RSD	122nd	0	
