= 1986 Summer 500 =

16th race of the 1986 NASCAR Winston Cup Series

Race details
- Race 16 of 29 in the 1986 NASCAR Winston Cup Series
- The 1986 Summer 500 program cover, featuring Darrell Waltrip.
- Date: July 20, 1986
- Official name: 14th Annual Summer 500
- Location: Long Pond, Pennsylvania, Pocono Raceway
- Course: Permanent racing facility
- Course length: 2.5 miles (4.0 km)
- Distance: 150 laps, 375 mi (603.504 km)
- Scheduled distance: 200 laps, 500 mi (804.672 km)
- Average speed: 124.218 miles per hour (199.909 km/h)
- Attendance: 60,000

Pole position
Driver	Harry Gant	Mach 1 Racing
- Time: 58.293

Most laps led
Driver	Geoff Bodine	Hendrick Motorsports
- Laps: 52

Winner
No. 25	Tim Richmond	Hendrick Motorsports

Television in the United States
- Network: SETN
- Announcers: Mike Joy, Jerry Punch

Radio in the United States
- Radio: Motor Racing Network

The 1986 Summer 500 was the 16th stock car race of the 1986 NASCAR Winston Cup Series and the 14th iteration of the event. The race was held on Sunday, July 20, 1986, before an audience of 60,000 in Long Pond, Pennsylvania, at Pocono Raceway, a 2.5 miles (4.0 km) triangular permanent course. The race was shortened from its scheduled 200 laps to 150 laps due to a combination of rain, darkness, and fog.

In the final laps of the race, Hendrick Motorsports teammates Tim Richmond and Geoff Bodine engaged in a dogfight for the lead. As the two rubbed fenders throughout driving the last two turns, Bud Moore Engineering's Ricky Rudd was able to charge his way into the fray, and by the time all three drivers got out of the last turn, Rudd and Richmond were side-by-side for the lead. At the time, Richmond bested out Rudd by a foot, in the process managing to come back from a lap down to claim the victory. The victory was Richmond's eighth career NASCAR Winston Cup Series victory and his third victory of the season. To fill out the top three, Bodine finished third.

== Background ==
The layout of Pocono International Raceway, the venue where the race was held.

The race was held at Pocono International Raceway, which is a three-turn superspeedway located in Long Pond, Pennsylvania. The track hosts two annual NASCAR Sprint Cup Series races, as well as one Xfinity Series and Camping World Truck Series event. Until 2019, the track also hosted an IndyCar Series race.

Pocono International Raceway is one of a very few NASCAR tracks not owned by either Speedway Motorsports, Inc. or International Speedway Corporation. It is operated by the Igdalsky siblings Brandon, Nicholas, and sister Ashley, and cousins Joseph IV and Chase Mattioli, all of whom are third-generation members of the family-owned Mattco Inc, started by Joseph II and Rose Mattioli.

Outside of the NASCAR races, the track is used throughout the year by the Sports Car Club of America (SCCA) and motorcycle clubs as well as racing schools and an IndyCar race. The triangular oval also has three separate infield sections of racetrack – North Course, East Course and South Course. Each of these infield sections use a separate portion of the tri-oval to complete the track. During regular non-race weekends, multiple clubs can use the track by running on different infield sections. Also some of the infield sections can be run in either direction, or multiple infield sections can be put together – such as running the North Course and the South Course and using the tri-oval to connect the two.

=== Entry list ===
- (R) denotes rookie driver.

#	Driver	Team	Make	Sponsor
3	Dale Earnhardt	Richard Childress Racing	Chevrolet	Wrangler
4	Rick Wilson	Morgan–McClure Motorsports	Oldsmobile	Kodak
5	Geoff Bodine	Hendrick Motorsports	Chevrolet	Levi Garrett
6	D. K. Ulrich	U.S. Racing	Chevrolet	U.S. Racing
7	Kyle Petty	Wood Brothers Racing	Ford	7-Eleven
8	Bobby Hillin Jr.	Stavola Brothers Racing	Chevrolet	Miller American
9	Bill Elliott	Melling Racing	Ford	Coors
11	Darrell Waltrip	Junior Johnson & Associates	Chevrolet	Budweiser
12	Neil Bonnett	Junior Johnson & Associates	Chevrolet	Budweiser
15	Ricky Rudd	Bud Moore Engineering	Ford	Motorcraft Quality Parts
17	Doug Heveron	Hamby Racing	Chevrolet	Hamby Racing
18	Tommy Ellis	Freedlander Motorsports	Chevrolet	Freedlander Financial
22	Bobby Allison	Stavola Brothers Racing	Buick	Miller American
23	Michael Waltrip (R)	Bahari Racing	Pontiac	Hawaiian Punch
25	Tim Richmond	Hendrick Motorsports	Chevrolet	Folgers
26	Joe Ruttman	King Racing	Buick	Quaker State
27	Rusty Wallace	Blue Max Racing	Pontiac	Alugard
28	Cale Yarborough	Ranier-Lundy Racing	Ford	Hardee's
33	Harry Gant	Mach 1 Racing	Chevrolet	Skoal Bandit
34	Jocko Maggiacomo	Linro Motorsports	Oldsmobile	WMGC-TV
35	Alan Kulwicki (R)	AK Racing	Ford	Quincy's Steakhouse
43	Richard Petty	Petty Enterprises	Pontiac	STP
44	Terry Labonte	Hagan Enterprises	Oldsmobile	Piedmont Airlines
47	Morgan Shepherd	Race Hill Farm Team	Chevrolet	Race Hill Farm Team
48	Jerry Cranmer	Hylton Motorsports	Chevrolet	Hylton Motorsports
49	Ferdin Wallace	Hylton Motorsports	Chevrolet	Hylton Motorsports
52	Jimmy Means	Jimmy Means Racing	Pontiac	Jimmy Means Racing
55	Benny Parsons	Jackson Bros. Motorsports	Oldsmobile	Copenhagen
60	Cliff Hucul	Eller Racing	Pontiac	Eller Racing
64	Eddie Bierschwale	Langley Racing	Ford	Sunny King Ford
66	Phil Parsons	Jackson Bros. Motorsports	Oldsmobile	Skoal
67	Buddy Arrington	Arrington Racing	Ford	Pannill Sweatshirts
70	J. D. McDuffie	McDuffie Racing	Pontiac	Rumple Furniture
71	Dave Marcis	Marcis Auto Racing	Pontiac	Helen Rae Special
74	Jack Ely	Wawak Racing	Chevrolet	Wawak Racing
75	Jim Sauter	RahMoc Enterprises	Pontiac	Nationwise Automotive
80	Gary Fedewa	Burke Racing	Chevrolet	Micromatic Refrigeration Sales
81	Chet Fillip (R)	Fillip Racing	Ford	Circle Bar Truck Corral
85	Bobby Gerhart	Bobby Gerhart Racing	Chevrolet	Bobby Gerhart Racing
88	Buddy Baker	Baker–Schiff Racing	Oldsmobile	Crisco
90	Ken Schrader	Donlavey Racing	Ford	Red Baron Frozen Pizza

== Qualifying ==
Qualifying was originally scheduled to be split into two rounds. The first round was scheduled to be held on Friday, March 14, at 10:00 a.m. EST. Originally, the first 20 positions were going to be determined by first round qualifying, with positions 21-40 meant to be determined later in the day at 3:00 p.m. EST. However, due to rain, the first round was cancelled. As a result, qualifying was both delayed for almost four hours and condensed into one round for all starting grid spots in the race. Depending on who needed it, a select amount of positions were given to cars who had not otherwise qualified but were high enough in owner's points; up to two were given.

Harry Gant, driving for Mach 1 Racing, won the pole, setting a time of 58.293 and an average speed of 154.392 miles per hour (248.470 km/h).

Ferdin Wallace was the only driver that failed to qualify.

=== Full qualifying results ===
Pos.	#	Driver	Team	Make	Time	Speed
1	33	Harry Gant	Mach 1 Racing	Chevrolet	58.293	154.392
2	5	Geoff Bodine	Hendrick Motorsports	Chevrolet	58.307	154.355
3	44	Terry Labonte	Hagan Enterprises	Oldsmobile	58.565	153.675
4	9	Bill Elliott	Melling Racing	Ford	58.574	153.652
5	25	Tim Richmond	Hendrick Motorsports	Chevrolet	58.748	153.197
6	11	Darrell Waltrip	Junior Johnson & Associates	Chevrolet	58.815	153.022
7	43	Richard Petty	Petty Enterprises	Pontiac	58.931	152.721
8	47	Morgan Shepherd	Race Hill Farm Team	Buick	58.936	152.708
9	55	Benny Parsons	Jackson Bros. Motorsports	Oldsmobile	59.002	152.537
10	3	Dale Earnhardt	Richard Childress Racing	Chevrolet	59.031	152.462
11	27	Rusty Wallace	Blue Max Racing	Pontiac	59.109	152.261
12	22	Bobby Allison	Stavola Brothers Racing	Buick	59.212	151.996
13	15	Ricky Rudd	Bud Moore Engineering	Ford	59.246	151.909
14	12	Neil Bonnett	Junior Johnson & Associates	Chevrolet	59.246	151.909
15	66	Phil Parsons	Jackson Bros. Motorsports	Oldsmobile	59.272	151.842
16	28	Cale Yarborough	Ranier-Lundy Racing	Ford	59.317	151.727
17	8	Bobby Hillin Jr.	Stavola Brothers Racing	Buick	59.421	151.462
18	88	Buddy Baker	Baker–Schiff Racing	Oldsmobile	59.449	151.390
19	26	Joe Ruttman	King Racing	Buick	59.451	151.385
20	4	Rick Wilson	Morgan–McClure Motorsports	Oldsmobile	59.474	151.327
21	71	Dave Marcis	Marcis Auto Racing	Pontiac	59.494	151.276
22	75	Jim Sauter	RahMoc Enterprises	Pontiac	59.728	150.683
23	7	Kyle Petty	Wood Brothers Racing	Ford	59.827	150.434
24	85	Bobby Gerhart	Bobby Gerhart Racing	Chevrolet	1:00.112	149.721
25	18	Tommy Ellis	Freedlander Motorsports	Chevrolet	1:00.124	149.691
26	90	Ken Schrader	Donlavey Racing	Ford	1:00.247	149.385
27	23	Michael Waltrip (R)	Bahari Racing	Pontiac	1:00.389	149.034
28	35	Alan Kulwicki (R)	AK Racing	Ford	1:00.486	148.795
29	64	Eddie Bierschwale	Langley Racing	Ford	1:00.733	148.092
30	80	Gary Fedewa	Burke Racing	Chevrolet	1:00.851	147.902
31	17	Doug Heveron	Hamby Racing	Chevrolet	1:00.899	147.786
32	81	Chet Fillip (R)	Fillip Racing	Ford	1:00.947	147.669
33	70	J. D. McDuffie	McDuffie Racing	Pontiac	1:01.200	147.059
34	67	Buddy Arrington	Arrington Racing	Ford	1:01.264	146.905
35	48	Jerry Cranmer	Hylton Motorsports	Chevrolet	1:01.375	146.640
36	52	Jimmy Means	Jimmy Means Racing	Pontiac	1:01.464	146.427
37	74	Jack Ely	Wawak Racing	Chevrolet	1:02.113	144.897
38	6	D. K. Ulrich	U.S. Racing	Chevrolet	1:02.321	144.414
39	34	Jocko Maggiacomo	Linro Motorsports	Oldsmobile	1:04.628	139.359
40	60	Cliff Hucul	Eller Racing	Pontiac	1:05.728	136.928
Failed to qualify
41	49	Ferdin Wallace	Hylton Motorsports	Chevrolet	1:12.144	124.750
Official starting lineup

== Race results ==
Fin	St	#	Driver	Team	Make	Laps	Led	Status	Pts	Winnings
1	5	25	Tim Richmond	Hendrick Motorsports	Chevrolet	150	48	running	180	$46,805
2	13	15	Ricky Rudd	Bud Moore Engineering	Ford	150	0	running	170	$29,500
3	2	5	Geoff Bodine	Hendrick Motorsports	Chevrolet	150	52	running	175	$22,350
4	6	11	Darrell Waltrip	Junior Johnson & Associates	Chevrolet	150	29	running	165	$23,825
5	12	22	Bobby Allison	Stavola Brothers Racing	Buick	150	0	running	155	$17,525
6	3	44	Terry Labonte	Hagan Enterprises	Oldsmobile	150	0	running	150	$13,775
7	10	3	Dale Earnhardt	Richard Childress Racing	Chevrolet	150	0	running	146	$14,655
8	23	7	Kyle Petty	Wood Brothers Racing	Ford	149	0	running	142	$12,085
9	25	18	Tommy Ellis	Freedlander Motorsports	Chevrolet	148	0	running	138	$6,710
10	20	4	Rick Wilson	Morgan–McClure Motorsports	Oldsmobile	148	0	running	134	$5,740
11	27	23	Michael Waltrip (R)	Bahari Racing	Pontiac	148	1	running	135	$4,470
12	32	81	Chet Fillip (R)	Fillip Racing	Ford	148	0	running	127	$3,750
13	36	52	Jimmy Means	Jimmy Means Racing	Pontiac	148	0	running	124	$8,025
14	22	75	Jim Sauter	RahMoc Enterprises	Pontiac	147	0	running	121	$7,450
15	29	64	Eddie Bierschwale	Langley Racing	Ford	147	0	running	118	$7,420
16	31	17	Doug Heveron	Hamby Racing	Chevrolet	146	0	running	115	$6,830
17	34	67	Buddy Arrington	Arrington Racing	Ford	146	0	running	112	$6,665
18	38	6	D. K. Ulrich	U.S. Racing	Chevrolet	145	0	running	109	$6,400
19	33	70	J. D. McDuffie	McDuffie Racing	Pontiac	145	0	running	106	$5,980
20	37	74	Jack Ely	Wawak Racing	Chevrolet	144	0	running	103	$3,010
21	30	80	Gary Fedewa	Burke Racing	Chevrolet	144	0	running	100	$2,355
22	28	35	Alan Kulwicki (R)	AK Racing	Ford	143	0	oil line	97	$2,250
23	26	90	Ken Schrader	Donlavey Racing	Ford	143	0	running	94	$6,350
24	21	71	Dave Marcis	Marcis Auto Racing	Pontiac	139	0	running	91	$5,135
25	16	28	Cale Yarborough	Ranier-Lundy Racing	Ford	138	0	engine	88	$2,135
26	35	48	Jerry Cranmer	Hylton Motorsports	Chevrolet	137	0	accident	85	$4,755
27	11	27	Rusty Wallace	Blue Max Racing	Pontiac	133	0	engine	82	$8,925
28	24	85	Bobby Gerhart	Bobby Gerhart Racing	Chevrolet	129	0	running	79	$1,870
29	9	55	Benny Parsons	Jackson Bros. Motorsports	Oldsmobile	128	0	accident	76	$1,815
30	1	33	Harry Gant	Mach 1 Racing	Chevrolet	126	14	accident	78	$13,360
31	14	12	Neil Bonnett	Junior Johnson & Associates	Chevrolet	125	6	accident	75	$10,105
32	8	47	Morgan Shepherd	Race Hill Farm Team	Buick	123	0	accident	67	$1,625
33	17	8	Bobby Hillin Jr.	Stavola Brothers Racing	Buick	123	0	accident	64	$4,335
34	7	43	Richard Petty	Petty Enterprises	Pontiac	120	0	accident	61	$4,270
35	4	9	Bill Elliott	Melling Racing	Ford	103	0	engine	58	$10,660
36	18	88	Buddy Baker	Baker–Schiff Racing	Oldsmobile	98	0	oil pressure	55	$1,405
37	15	66	Phil Parsons	Jackson Bros. Motorsports	Oldsmobile	86	0	ignition	52	$1,380
38	19	26	Joe Ruttman	King Racing	Buick	18	0	accident	49	$4,090
39	39	34	Jocko Maggiacomo	Linro Motorsports	Oldsmobile	12	0	engine	46	$1,200
40	40	60	Cliff Hucul	Eller Racing	Pontiac	2	0	clutch	43	$1,175
Failed to qualify
41		49	Ferdin Wallace	Hylton Motorsports	Chevrolet					
Official race results

== Standings after the race ==
Drivers' Championship standings

	Pos	Driver	Points
	1	Dale Earnhardt	2,490
	2	Darrell Waltrip	2,331 (-159)
	3	Tim Richmond	2,225 (-265)
1	4	Bobby Allison	2,188 (–302)
2	5	Ricky Rudd	2,128 (–362)
1	6	Bill Elliott	2,095 (–395)
2	7	Rusty Wallace	2,080 (–410)
	8	Terry Labonte	2,009 (–481)
2	9	Geoff Bodine	1,957 (–533)
1	10	Harry Gant	1,936 (–554)
Official driver's standings

- Note: Only the first 10 positions are included for the driver standings.

Previous race: 1986 Firecracker 400	NASCAR Winston Cup Series; 1986 season	Next race: 1986 Talladega 500
