= 1986 Talladega 500 =

17th race of the 1986 NASCAR Winston Cup Series

Race details
- Race 17 of 29 in the 1986 NASCAR Winston Cup Series
- The 1986 Talladega 500 program cover, featuring Cale Yarborough.
- Date: July 27, 1986
- Official name: 18th Annual Talladega 500
- Location: Lincoln, Alabama, Alabama International Motor Speedway
- Course: Permanent racing facility
- Course length: 2.66 miles (4.28 km)
- Distance: 188 laps, 500.08 mi (804.8 km)
- Scheduled distance: 188 laps, 500.08 mi (804.8 km)
- Average speed: 151.522 miles per hour (243.851 km/h)
- Attendance: 105,000

Pole position
Driver	Bill Elliott	Melling Racing
- Time: 45.817

Most laps led
Driver	Dale Earnhardt	Richard Childress Racing
- Laps: 54

Winner
No. 8	Bobby Hillin Jr.	Stavola Brothers Racing

Television in the United States
- Network: CBS
- Announcers: Ken Squier, Ned Jarrett

Radio in the United States
- Radio: Motor Racing Network

The 1986 Talladega 500 was the 17th stock car race of the 1986 NASCAR Winston Cup Series and the 18th iteration of the event. The race was held on Sunday, July 27, 1986, before an audience of 105,000 in Lincoln, Alabama at Alabama International Motor Speedway, a 2.66 miles (4.28 km) permanent triangle-shaped superspeedway. The race took the scheduled 188 laps to complete.

In a race plagued by high temperatures, by the final laps of the race, few cars remained. Of the ones that did, a battle for the lead between Stavola Brothers Racing's Bobby Hillin Jr., Hendrick Motorsports' Tim Richmond, and Ricky Rudd, who at the time was replaced by Rusty Wallace, was created that stretched out into the final lap of the race. At the finish, Hillin Jr. was able to defend the two, securing his only career NASCAR Winston Cup Series victory, his only win of the season, and at the time, the record for the youngest driver to win in the NASCAR Winston Cup Series. To fill out the top three, Richmond and Rudd finished second and third, respectively.

== Background ==
The layout of Alabama International Motor Speedway, the venue where the race was held.

Talladega Superspeedway, originally known as Alabama International Motor Superspeedway (AIMS), is a motorsports complex located north of Talladega, Alabama. It is located on the former Anniston Air Force Base in the small city of Lincoln. The track is a tri-oval and was constructed in the 1960s by the International Speedway Corporation, a business controlled by the France family. Talladega is most known for its steep banking and the unique location of the start/finish line that's located just past the exit to pit road. The track currently hosts the NASCAR series such as the NASCAR Cup Series, Xfinity Series and the Camping World Truck Series. Talladega is the longest NASCAR oval, a 2.66-mile-long (4.28 km) tri-oval like the Daytona International Speedway, which also is a 2.5-mile-long (4.0 km) tri-oval.

=== Entry list ===
- (R) denotes rookie driver.

#	Driver	Team	Make	Sponsor
0	Delma Cowart	H. L. Waters Racing	Chevrolet	Heyward Grooms Construction
1	Sterling Marlin	Ellington Racing	Chevrolet	Bull's-Eye Barbecue Sauce
2	Rodney Combs	Harrington Racing	Chevrolet	Soldier Seal, Gunk
3	Dale Earnhardt	Richard Childress Racing	Chevrolet	Wrangler
4	Rick Wilson	Morgan–McClure Motorsports	Oldsmobile	Kodak
5	Geoff Bodine	Hendrick Motorsports	Chevrolet	Levi Garrett
6	D. K. Ulrich	U.S. Racing	Chevrolet	U.S. Racing
7	Kyle Petty	Wood Brothers Racing	Ford	7-Eleven
8	Bobby Hillin Jr.	Stavola Brothers Racing	Chevrolet	Miller American
9	Bill Elliott	Melling Racing	Ford	Coors
11	Darrell Waltrip	Junior Johnson & Associates	Chevrolet	Budweiser
12	Neil Bonnett	Junior Johnson & Associates	Chevrolet	Budweiser
14	A. J. Foyt	A. J. Foyt Racing	Oldsmobile	Copenhagen
15	Ricky Rudd	Bud Moore Engineering	Ford	Motorcraft Quality Parts
17	Pancho Carter	Hamby Racing	Chevrolet	Kmart
18	Tommy Ellis	Freedlander Motorsports	Chevrolet	Freedlander Financial
22	Bobby Allison	Stavola Brothers Racing	Buick	Miller American
23	Michael Waltrip (R)	Bahari Racing	Pontiac	Hawaiian Punch
25	Tim Richmond	Hendrick Motorsports	Chevrolet	Folgers
26	Joe Ruttman	King Racing	Buick	Quaker State
27	Rusty Wallace	Blue Max Racing	Pontiac	Alugard
28	Cale Yarborough	Ranier-Lundy Racing	Ford	Hardee's
29	Grant Adcox	Adcox Racing	Chevrolet	Adcox Racing
33	Harry Gant	Mach 1 Racing	Chevrolet	Skoal Bandit
35	Alan Kulwicki (R)	AK Racing	Ford	Quincy's Steakhouse
43	Richard Petty	Petty Enterprises	Pontiac	STP
44	Terry Labonte	Hagan Enterprises	Oldsmobile	Piedmont Airlines
47	Morgan Shepherd	Race Hill Farm Team	Chevrolet	Race Hill Farm Team
48	Ronnie Thomas	Hylton Motorsports	Chevrolet	Hylton Motorsports
52	Jimmy Means	Jimmy Means Racing	Pontiac	Jimmy Means Racing
54	Eddie Bierschwale	Gray Racing	Chevrolet	Kodak
55	Benny Parsons	Jackson Bros. Motorsports	Oldsmobile	Copenhagen
64	Connie Saylor	Langley Racing	Ford	Sunny King Ford
66	Phil Parsons	Jackson Bros. Motorsports	Oldsmobile	Skoal
67	Buddy Arrington	Arrington Racing	Ford	Pannill Sweatshirts
70	J. D. McDuffie	McDuffie Racing	Pontiac	Rumple Furniture
71	Dave Marcis	Marcis Auto Racing	Pontiac	Helen Rae Special
73	Phil Barkdoll	Barkdoll Racing	Ford	Helen Rae Special
75	Jim Sauter	RahMoc Enterprises	Pontiac	Nationwise Automotive
77	Ken Ragan	Ragan Racing	Chevrolet	McCord Gasket
79	Derrike Cope	Razore Racing	Ford	Peterbilt
81	Chet Fillip (R)	Fillip Racing	Ford	Circle Bar Truck Corral
88	Buddy Baker	Baker–Schiff Racing	Oldsmobile	Evinrude Outboard Motors
90	Ken Schrader	Donlavey Racing	Ford	Red Baron Frozen Pizza
98	Ron Bouchard	Curb Racing	Pontiac	Valvoline

== Qualifying ==
Qualifying was split into two rounds. The first round was held on Thursday, July 24, at 2:00 p.m. EST. Each driver had one lap to set a time. During the first round, the top 20 drivers in the round were guaranteed a starting spot in the race. If a driver was not able to guarantee a spot in the first round, they had the option to scrub their time from the first round and try and run a faster lap time in a second round qualifying run, held on Friday, July 25, at 2:00 p.m. EST. As with the first round, each driver had one lap to set a time. For this specific race, positions 21-40 were decided on time, and depending on who needed it, a select amount of positions were given to cars who had not otherwise qualified but were high enough in owner's points; up to two provisionals were given.

Bill Elliott, driving for Melling Racing, won the pole, setting a time of 45.817 and an average speed of 209.005 miles per hour (336.361 km/h) in the first round.

Four drivers failed to qualify.

=== Full qualifying results ===
Pos.	#	Driver	Team	Make	Time	Speed
1	9	Bill Elliott	Melling Racing	Ford	45.817	209.005
2	3	Dale Earnhardt	Richard Childress Racing	Chevrolet	46.027	208.052
3	25	Tim Richmond	Hendrick Motorsports	Chevrolet	46.141	207.538
4	55	Benny Parsons	Jackson Bros. Motorsports	Oldsmobile	46.171	207.403
5	1	Sterling Marlin	Ellington Racing	Chevrolet	46.218	207.192
6	7	Kyle Petty	Wood Brothers Racing	Ford	46.242	207.084
7	12	Davey Allison	Junior Johnson & Associates	Chevrolet	46.408	206.344
8	4	Rick Wilson	Morgan–McClure Motorsports	Oldsmobile	46.441	206.197
9	44	Terry Labonte	Hagan Enterprises	Oldsmobile	46.466	206.086
10	5	Geoff Bodine	Hendrick Motorsports	Chevrolet	46.495	205.958
11	14	A. J. Foyt	A. J. Foyt Racing	Oldsmobile	46.519	205.851
12	88	Buddy Baker	Baker–Schiff Racing	Oldsmobile	46.523	205.834
13	8	Bobby Hillin Jr.	Stavola Brothers Racing	Buick	46.537	205.772
14	47	Morgan Shepherd	Race Hill Farm Team	Buick	46.652	205.265
15	11	Darrell Waltrip	Junior Johnson & Associates	Chevrolet	46.665	205.207
16	66	Phil Parsons	Jackson Bros. Motorsports	Oldsmobile	46.677	205.155
17	2	Rodney Combs	Harrington Racing	Chevrolet	46.713	204.996
18	75	Jim Sauter	RahMoc Enterprises	Pontiac	46.763	204.777
19	28	Cale Yarborough	Ranier-Lundy Racing	Ford	46.803	204.602
20	15	Ricky Rudd	Bud Moore Engineering	Ford	46.852	204.388
Failed to lock in Round 1
21	22	Bobby Allison	Stavola Brothers Racing	Buick	46.905	204.157
22	27	Rusty Wallace	Blue Max Racing	Pontiac	46.929	204.053
23	26	Joe Ruttman	King Racing	Buick	46.971	203.870
24	43	Richard Petty	Petty Enterprises	Pontiac	47.124	203.209
25	81	Chet Fillip (R)	Fillip Racing	Ford	47.124	203.209
26	18	Tommy Ellis	Freedlander Motorsports	Chevrolet	47.151	203.092
27	98	Ron Bouchard	Curb Racing	Pontiac	47.285	202.517
28	35	Alan Kulwicki (R)	AK Racing	Ford	47.302	202.444
29	71	Dave Marcis	Marcis Auto Racing	Pontiac	47.344	202.264
30	0	Delma Cowart	H. L. Waters Racing	Chevrolet	47.371	202.149
31	73	Phil Barkdoll	Barkdoll Racing	Ford	47.386	202.085
32	33	Harry Gant	Mach 1 Racing	Chevrolet	47.442	201.846
33	17	Pancho Carter	Hamby Racing	Chevrolet	47.501	201.596
34	23	Michael Waltrip (R)	Bahari Racing	Pontiac	47.529	201.477
35	90	Ken Schrader	Donlavey Racing	Ford	47.563	201.333
36	48	Ronnie Thomas	Hylton Motorsports	Chevrolet	47.615	201.113
37	67	Buddy Arrington	Arrington Racing	Ford	47.616	201.109
38	54	Eddie Bierschwale	Gray Racing	Chevrolet	47.633	201.037
39	52	Jimmy Means	Jimmy Means Racing	Pontiac	47.867	200.042
40	77	Ken Ragan	Ragan Racing	Chevrolet	47.913	199.862
Failed to qualify
41	6	D. K. Ulrich	U.S. Racing	Chevrolet	-*	-*
42	29	Grant Adcox	Adcox Racing	Chevrolet	-*	-*
43	64	Connie Saylor	Langley Racing	Ford	-*	-*
44	70	J. D. McDuffie	McDuffie Racing	Pontiac	-*	-*
WD	79	Derrike Cope	Razore Racing	Ford	-	-
Official first round qualifying results
Official starting lineup

== Race results ==
Fin	St	#	Driver	Team	Make	Laps	Led	Status	Pts	Winnings
1	13	8	Bobby Hillin Jr.	Stavola Brothers Racing	Buick	188	16	running	180	$60,055
2	3	25	Tim Richmond	Hendrick Motorsports	Chevrolet	188	19	running	175	$34,345
3	20	15	Ricky Rudd (Note: On the race's 116th lap, Rudd was replaced by Rusty Wallace as Rudd was suffering from the flu. Wallace had previously retired from the race on the 70th lap. As Rudd started the race, he is credited with the finishing position.)	Bud Moore Engineering	Ford	188	0	running	165	$29,255
4	5	1	Sterling Marlin	Ellington Racing	Chevrolet	188	9	running	165	$15,750
5	4	55	Benny Parsons	Jackson Bros. Motorsports	Oldsmobile	188	2	running	160	$12,815
6	14	47	Morgan Shepherd	Race Hill Farm Team	Buick	188	0	running	150	$9,170
7	7	12	Davey Allison	Junior Johnson & Associates	Chevrolet	188	13	running	151	$17,820
8	23	26	Joe Ruttman	King Racing	Buick	188	0	running	142	$10,495
9	6	7	Kyle Petty	Wood Brothers Racing	Ford	188	2	running	143	$12,570
10	21	22	Bobby Allison	Stavola Brothers Racing	Buick	187	2	accident	139	$13,720
11	8	4	Rick Wilson	Morgan–McClure Motorsports	Oldsmobile	187	7	accident	135	$5,040
12	18	75	Jim Sauter	RahMoc Enterprises	Pontiac	187	2	accident	132	$8,835
13	16	66	Phil Parsons	Jackson Bros. Motorsports	Oldsmobile	187	1	running	129	$4,350
14	34	23	Michael Waltrip (R)	Bahari Racing	Pontiac	186	1	running	126	$4,780
15	39	52	Jimmy Means	Jimmy Means Racing	Pontiac	184	1	running	123	$8,380
16	36	48	Ronnie Thomas	Hylton Motorsports	Chevrolet	183	0	running	115	$7,800
17	27	98	Ron Bouchard	Curb Racing	Pontiac	174	0	accident	112	$3,730
18	40	77	Ken Ragan	Ragan Racing	Chevrolet	169	1	accident	114	$3,710
19	17	2	Rodney Combs (Note: Midway into the race, Combs was replaced by Alan Kulwicki as Combs reported numbness in his arm. Kulwicki had previously retired from the race on the 112th lap. As Combs started the race, he is credited with the finishing position.)	Harrington Racing	Chevrolet	169	4	accident	111	$3,710
20	12	88	Buddy Baker	Baker–Schiff Racing	Oldsmobile	163	3	overheating	108	$4,130
21	37	67	Buddy Arrington	Arrington Racing	Ford	162	0	running	100	$6,935
22	32	33	Harry Gant	Mach 1 Racing	Chevrolet	159	5	accident	102	$12,050
23	10	5	Geoff Bodine	Hendrick Motorsports	Chevrolet	159	19	accident	99	$11,140
24	19	28	Cale Yarborough	Ranier-Lundy Racing	Ford	159	0	accident	91	$2,930
25	15	11	Darrell Waltrip	Junior Johnson & Associates	Chevrolet	157	3	accident	93	$13,670
26	2	3	Dale Earnhardt	Richard Childress Racing	Chevrolet	153	54	engine	95	$15,355
27	1	9	Bill Elliott	Melling Racing	Ford	152	5	valve	87	$15,185
28	25	81	Chet Fillip (R)	Fillip Racing	Ford	150	0	accident	79	$3,625
29	30	0	Delma Cowart	H. L. Waters Racing	Chevrolet	140	0	engine	76	$2,565
30	11	14	A. J. Foyt	A. J. Foyt Racing	Oldsmobile	119	0	wheel bearing	73	$7,010
31	35	90	Ken Schrader	Donlavey Racing	Ford	113	1	engine	75	$7,010
32	28	35	Alan Kulwicki (R)	AK Racing	Ford	112	2	clutch	72	$2,485
33	31	73	Phil Barkdoll	Barkdoll Racing	Ford	100	2	overheating	0	$3,225
34	26	18	Tommy Ellis	Freedlander Motorsports	Chevrolet	86	0	engine	61	$2,365
35	22	27	Rusty Wallace	Blue Max Racing	Pontiac	70	0	engine	58	$5,410
36	29	71	Dave Marcis	Marcis Auto Racing	Pontiac	61	0	head gasket	55	$5,210
37	24	43	Richard Petty	Petty Enterprises	Pontiac	51	5	accident	57	$5,080
38	9	44	Terry Labonte	Hagan Enterprises	Oldsmobile	37	8	oil pressure	54	$9,440
39	38	54	Eddie Bierschwale	Gray Racing	Chevrolet	37	0	valve	46	$1,990
40	33	17	Pancho Carter	Hamby Racing	Chevrolet	29	1	engine	48	$4,680
Failed to qualify
41		6	D. K. Ulrich	U.S. Racing	Chevrolet					
42		29	Grant Adcox	Adcox Racing	Chevrolet					
43		64	Connie Saylor	Langley Racing	Ford					
44		70	J. D. McDuffie	McDuffie Racing	Pontiac					
WD		79	Derrike Cope	Razore Racing	Ford					
Official race results

== Standings after the race ==
Drivers' Championship standings

	Pos	Driver	Points
	1	Dale Earnhardt	2,585
	2	Darrell Waltrip	2,424 (-161)
	3	Tim Richmond	2,400 (-185)
	4	Bobby Allison	2,327 (–258)
	5	Ricky Rudd	2,293 (–292)
	6	Bill Elliott	2,182 (–403)
	7	Rusty Wallace	2,138 (–447)
	8	Terry Labonte	2,063 (–522)
1	9	Harry Gant	2,060 (–525)
2	10	Bobby Hillin Jr.	2,059 (–526)
Official driver's standings

- Note: Only the first 10 positions are included for the driver standings.

== Notes ==
Previous race: 1986 Summer 500	NASCAR Winston Cup Series; 1986 season	Next race: 1986 The Budweiser at The Glen
