= Lowell Cowell =

American racecar driver (1945–2018)

- Born: October 10, 1945; Wana, West Virginia, U.S.
- Died: November 12, 2018 (aged 73); Morgantown, West Virginia, U.S.
- Cause of death: Pancreatic cancer

NASCAR Cup Series career
- 10 races run over 3 years
- Best finish: 13th (1982)
- First race: 1981 Mason-Dixon 500 (Dover)
- Last race: 1983 Winston 500 (Talladega)
Wins	Top tens	Poles
0	0	0

Lowell Arthur Cowell (October 10, 1945 - November 12, 2018) was an American NASCAR Winston Cup Series driver. He drove in ten total Winston Cup races from 1981 to 1983.

== Racing career ==
Debuting in the NASCAR Winston Cup Series in 1981, Cowell drove four races for Roger Hamby, having a best finish of seventeenth at Texas World Speedway. He drove in five races for Hamby, including the Daytona 500, in 1982, scoring a best finish of thirteenth in the return trip to Daytona in summer. Cowell attempted the 1983 Daytona 500 with Cecil Gordon, but failed to qualify. He later ran the 1983 Winston 500 with Mike Potter, finishing 26th after an engine failure. Cowell's last NASCAR attempt was the 1984 Daytona 500 with Potter, where he failed to qualify.

== Personal life ==
Cowell was a 1963 graduate of Clay-Batelle Middle/High School. He was also an entrepreneur, owning various small businesses throughout his life. Cowell married Jacqualine Wilson and they had three kids.

== Motorsports career results ==
=== NASCAR ===
==== Winston Cup Series ====
NASCAR Winston Cup Series results
Year	Car owner	No.	Make	1	2	3	4	5	6	7	8	9	10	11	12	13	14	15	16	17	18	19	20	21	22	23	24	25	26	27	28	29	30	31	NWCC	Pts	Ref
1981	Roger Hamby	17	Chevy	RSD	DAY	RCH	CAR	ATL	BRI	NWS	DAR	MAR	TAL	NSV	DOV; 28	CLT						POC; 28	TAL	MCH	BRI	DAR	RCH	DOV; 22	MAR	NWS	CLT	CAR	ATL	RSD	57th	288	
1981	Roger Hamby	77	Olds														TWS; 17	RSD	MCH	DAY	NSV														57th	288	
1982	Roger Hamby	17	Buick	DAY; 14	RCH	BRI	ATL	CAR	DAR	NWS	MAR																								39th	554	
1982	Roger Hamby	66	Buick									TAL; 21	NSV	DOV	CLT	POC; 21	RSD	MCH																	39th	554	
1982	Roger Hamby	66	Olds																DAY; 13	NSV	POC	TAL; 18	MCH	BRI	DAR	RCH	DOV	NWS	CLT	MAR	CAR	ATL	RSD		39th	554	
1983	Cecil Gordon	24	Chrysler	DAY; DNQ	RCH	CAR	ATL	DAR	NWS	MAR																									N/A	N/A	
1983	Mike Potter	76	Olds								TAL; 26	NSV	DOV	BRI	CLT	RSD	POC	MCH	DAY	NSV	POC	TAL	MCH	BRI	DAR	RCH	DOV	MAR	NWS	CLT	CAR	ATL	RSD		N/A	N/A	
1984	Mike Potter	76	Olds	DAY; DNQ	RCH	CAR	ATL	BRI	NWS	DAR	MAR	TAL	NSV	DOV	CLT	RSD	POC	MCH	DAY	NSV	POC	TAL	MCH	BRI	DAR	RCH	DOV	MAR	CLT	NWS	CAR	ATL	RSD		N/A	0	

===== Daytona 500 =====
Year	Car owner	Manufacturer	Start	Finish
1982	Roger Hamby	Buick	36	14
1983	Cecil Gordon	Chrysler	DNQ	
1984	Mike Potter	Olds	DNQ	
