= Ed Flemke =

American racing driver (1930–1984)

Edward Arthur Flemke
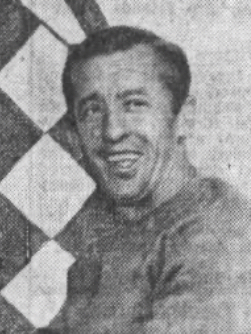
- Flemke in 1968
- Born: August 27, 1930 New Britain, Connecticut, U.S.
- Died: March 30, 1984 (aged 53) Manchester, Connecticut, U.S.

Ed "Steady Eddie" Flemke (August 27, 1930 – March 30, 1984) was active as an American race car driver and builder from 1948 until his death in 1984. Although best known as a driver, he also built many race cars for himself and others, was a technical innovator, and was renowned as a mentor to his competitors. His specialty was modified stock car racing, which became immensely popular in the U.S. in the decades following World War II. Flemke has been described as "likely New England's most legendary stock car racer." He may have had more overall impact on Modified racing in the U.S. than any other individual, being "a pioneer, innovator, teacher, fierce competitor, and living legend all rolled into one."

== Early life ==
From a young age, Flemke was exposed to cars and racing. His father, Jake, owned and operated a garage in New Britain, CT, and his older brother, George, drove midget racing cars for many years. In 1948, at the age of 17, Flemke was helping a friend at a race when he spontaneously decided to try driving the race car himself. On a whim, he drove out onto the track and began competing. He fell in love with racing and made it the focus of his life from that moment on.

Flemke's mentors included his brother George, along with Bert Brooks and Mike Nazaruk, all of whom were midget car drivers. While Flemke preferred driving midgets over other types of racing, the prize money in Modified racing was greater, so he focused his efforts on the latter.

== United Racing Club years ==
When Flemke began racing Modified cars, dozens of tracks along the East Coast held weekly Modified races. Each track operated either independently or as part of a sanctioning organization, the largest of which were the National Association for Stock Car Auto Racing (NASCAR) and the United Stock Car Racing Club. NASCAR tracks were primarily located in the Southeast, while United tracks were concentrated in the Northeast. Independent tracks were geographically dispersed but were most commonly found in New York, New Jersey, and Pennsylvania. Based in Connecticut, Flemke joined United and regularly raced at tracks like Riverside Park (MA), Plainville (CT), New London-Waterford (CT), Savin Rock/West Haven (CT), Candlelite Stadium (Bridgeport, CT), and the Springfield Exposition Fairgrounds (MA). All of these were paved asphalt tracks, which Flemke preferred over the dirt tracks that were also common in Modified racing.

In mid-1952, Flemke was drafted into the U.S. Army. He was stationed at various times at Fort Jackson, SC, Fort Devens, MA, Fort Dix, NJ, and Fort Knox, KY. While at each base, he raced whenever he was granted leave—and occasionally even when he wasn't—but records of his performance in those races are scarce. He remained in the Army until late 1954.

In the early 1950s, Flemke typically drove either his own #61 car or the #1 cars owned and operated by Rich Yurewich. In 1955, he became the regular driver of the #28 and #14 cars owned and managed by Richie and Ray Garuti, continuing with the Garutis through the 1958 season. In 1959, Flemke built his own car again, the metallic blue and gold #61.

Flemke remained with United through the 1959 season. The biggest event on the United calendar was the annual Riverside 500. Based on available documentation, Flemke competed in the Riverside 500 seven times, finishing first three times, second three times, and third once. During his 11 years racing with United, he won track championships at West Haven and Riverside Park and is known to have won at least 25 feature races at Riverside. Very few records are available for the 1950s results at Plainville, New London-Waterford, Candlelite, and West Haven.

== NASCAR years ==
Flemke joined NASCAR in 1960. His first NASCAR race was the 250-mile Permatex Modified-Sportsman event at Daytona, where he substituted for Benny Germano and drove a late-model Studebaker. Despite being unfamiliar with both the car and the track, he qualified 13th out of more than 75 entrants. However, on the first lap, he was involved in one of the largest crashes in motor racing history, which involved 37 cars, forcing him to retire from the race. Throughout the remainder of the 1960 season, he competed strongly at several Northeastern tracks, including Islip (NY), Plainville (CT), Empire (Menands, NY), Norwood (MA), and Westboro (MA).

In 1961, Flemke expanded his regular racing circuit to include Westhampton (NY) and Old Bridge, Wall, and Vineland (all in NJ). While racing at Islip, he was noticed by the promoter of Southside Speedway in Richmond, VA, who offered him guaranteed money to race there. Flemke accepted, made the trip to Richmond, and won the Southside 400. This marked the beginning of his trips from his home in New Britain, CT, down to Virginia and Maryland. Later in 1961, he won the Fredericksburg (VA) 250 and the Bowman Gray (NC) Tobacco Bowl 150. That same year, he was the track champion at both Old Bridge and Empire.

In 1962, Flemke established a regular weekly racing circuit. He raced at Islip on Wednesdays, Fort Dix (NJ) on Thursdays, Southside (VA) on Fridays, Old Dominion (Manassas, VA) on Saturdays, Marlboro (MD) on Sunday afternoons, and Old Bridge (NJ) on Sunday evenings, before returning home to Connecticut to work on his car and rest. Accompanying him on the circuit were his protégé, fellow driver Dennis Zimmerman—who later became the Indianapolis 500 Rookie of the Year—and John Stygar, chief mechanic and co-owner of one of Flemke's cars, known as the "$". Due to their domination of the southern tracks, locals dubbed Flemke and Zimmerman "The Eastern Bandits." Two other New England drivers, Rene Charland and Red Foote, heard of their success and also began traveling south to race. The nickname "Eastern Bandits" was eventually applied to all four drivers, although Flemke and Zimmerman were the originals.

There is no comprehensive record of how many races Flemke won in 1962, but it is known that he won at least nine races in succession at Old Dominion, competing against the best drivers in the South. He also won races at Southside, South Boston (VA), Marlboro, and Fort Dix, and achieved numerous high finishes at those tracks and others, including Fredericksburg, Old Bridge, Wall, Bowman Gray, and Tar Heel (Randleman, NC).

Flemke chose which races to compete in based on the prize money offered rather than the NASCAR championship points available. Despite his lack of interest in championship points, Flemke finished second in the NASCAR Modified points championship in both 1961 and 1962.

Although Flemke won numerous races and substantial (relative to the era) prize money in 1962, he concluded after the season that the expenses associated with fuel, motels, restaurant meals, wear-and-tear on car transport vehicles, and other costs, along with the effort required for extensive travel and the inconvenience of maintaining racing cars on the road, made it unjustifiable to continue the "Eastern Bandits" circuit every week. As a result, in 1963 he and Zimmerman focused more on racing at Northeastern tracks and ventured south of New Jersey only for the longer, big-money races. From 1963 to 1966, driving mostly cars he had built himself, such as the ¢, %, 21x, and 2, he won many races along the East Coast, including at Bowman Gray, Fort Dix, Old Bridge, Utica-Rome (NY), Norwood, Islip, Plainville, Southside, Albany-Saratoga (NY), Catamount (Milton, VT), Airborne (Plattsburg, NY), and Thompson (CT). During those years, he won track championships at Fort Dix, Utica-Rome, and Albany-Saratoga.

In a 1966 race at Albany-Saratoga, Rene Charland's car was involved in a crash and immediately burst into flames, trapping Charland inside. Although Flemke was wearing regular street clothes rather than a protective driving suit, he leaped out of his own car, ran straight into the flames, and pulled Charland from the burning wreckage. Racing photographer John Grady, who had witnessed thousands of races, later described it as "the bravest thing I have seen in my whole life."

In 1967, Flemke teamed up with Bob Judkins, the builder, owner, and chief mechanic of the 2x racing car. During that and the following season, usually driving the 2x, Flemke won or placed highly in multiple races throughout the Northeast at tracks such as Stafford (CT), Albany-Saratoga, Utica-Rome, Norwood, Airborne, Islip, Catamount, Thompson, Wall, and Lee (NH). He also set a new track record at Martinsville (VA) and finished second in long-distance races at South Boston and Beltsville (MD). In response to a newspaper reporter's question in 1968, Flemke estimated that by that point in his career, he had won "about 250" races.

In 1969, Flemke began driving the 2x less frequently and more often drove the #79, owned and operated by Greg Mills and Dave Welch. Although the #79 appeared to be inherently slower than some of its competitors, Flemke regularly won or placed highly at Stafford, Norwood, and Thompson. He was comfortably leading the Thompson 500—the longest-distance race ever held for Modifieds—until near the end of the race, when a valve broke in the #79's engine.

In 1970, Flemke split his time between driving the #61, owned by Richie Evans for New York races, and the #14, owned by Richie and Ray Garuti and Jack Arute for New England races. In the #14, he was very successful at Stafford and Thompson (Norwood no longer held Modified races). Driving the #61, he also performed well, including a legendary performance in the Utica-Rome "New Yorker 400," the biggest race in New York. Due to a dispute between Evans and NASCAR, the sanctioning body refused to allow the #61 to use the pits, even though Flemke was the driver, not Evans. Flemke and his crew were forced to use the public parking lot instead of the pit area, but despite this handicap, Flemke won the race.

In 1971, Flemke primarily drove the Art Barry #09. By Flemke's standards, the 1971 season was relatively less successful, although he achieved a major win in the Fulton (NY) 200 and won three races at Albany-Saratoga.

In 1972, the first full year NASCAR allowed Modifieds to run with current road car bodywork, Flemke began the season driving Frank Vigliarolo's #34 Pinto. This car, built by Bob Judkins (who had run the 2x in which Flemke had achieved great success in 1967–68), was the first with current bodywork to receive NASCAR sanction for the Modifieds. Flemke started the season by winning a 50-lap open-competition race at New London-Waterford. A week later, at the inaugural Stafford "Spring Sizzler," he comfortably led the race until 8 laps to go, when his car's water pump failed. The driver who inherited the lead and the win, former NASCAR National Modified Champion Fred DeSarro, remarked afterward, "He would have had to slip for me to get by him, and Ed Flemke doesn't slip." Despite running strongly in almost every race, persistent issues with defective crankshafts led to many retirements. Nonetheless, Flemke won other races at Stafford, Albany-Saratoga, and Autodrome de Quebec Val-Belair (Quebec), and achieved high placings at Seekonk (MA), Lancaster (NY), and Islip.

In June 1972, Flemke switched to driving a new Pinto Modified, the 2x, owned and built by Bob Judkins. He continued with the 2x Pinto as his regular ride until mid-1974. With the 2x Pinto, he won or achieved high placings in races at Monadnock (NH), Stafford, Islip, Thompson, Trenton (NJ), Albany-Saratoga, Seekonk, Lancaster, Oswego (NY), Martinsville, Pocono (PA), and Riverside. In 1973, he finished 4th in NASCAR National Modified points, despite his usual practice of choosing races based on prize money rather than points available (drivers who finished high in the point standings typically prioritized points over prize money).

Starting in mid-1974, Flemke began driving primarily for BOTAG Enterprises, which was later acquired by the Manchester Sand & Gravel Company owned by Bill Thornton. BOTAG ran the #7 Pinto and, more frequently, a series of #10 Pintos. From mid-1974 until 1978, Flemke drove the majority of his races in Manchester Sand & Gravel cars. He achieved considerable success in these cars, including wins and high placings at Seekonk, Plainville, Stafford, Thompson, Riverside, New London-Waterford, Albany-Saratoga, New Smyrna (FL), Westboro, and Chemung (NY). In 1977, at the age of 47, he won the two biggest Modified races in New England: the Stafford 200 and the Thompson 300.

In 1974, Flemke suffered his most serious injury from racing. While driving the Bob Garbarino #4 Pinto in the Stafford 200, his car made contact with another vehicle, flew into the air, rotated an estimated eight times, and landed on its top, crushing the roof. Although Flemke initially thought he was uninjured and climbed into another car to resume racing, he soon realized something was wrong and climbed out again. Later that day, he went to the hospital for an evaluation. The orthopedic specialist who examined him indicated that, given the nature of his broken vertebrae, he had expected Flemke to be paralyzed, potentially for life. Flemke was able to recover, although he could not return to racing until the spring of 1975.

Almost exactly a year after he broke his back, Flemke was involved in another serious crash, this time at Star Speedway (Epping, NH), in which he reinjured his vertebrae. He was forced to take seven weeks off from racing. At the time of the crash, he was leading the championship points at Thompson and was expected to win the track championship if he had not been injured.

In 1979, Bill Thornton decided to discontinue his involvement in racing and transferred his racing cars and equipment to Flemke. That season, as an unsponsored, 49-year-old independent, Flemke experienced less success than usual, although he still won or achieved high placings in races at Riverside, Stafford, Catamount, and Monadnock.

Flemke raced sparingly in 1980 and 1981, and in 1982, he drove his final race at Wall in Harry Reed's #7A. During the early 1980s, Flemke focused on working with his son (also named Ed, but not "Jr") on developing their Race Works business, which specialized in designing and building racing cars. In that operation, they were known for their technical innovations, consideration of driver safety, and high level of craftsmanship.

In 1983, the last full year of his life, Flemke served as Chief Steward at the New London-Waterford Speedbowl. Under his stewardship, there were many fewer incidents and race stoppages than previously, which was attributed to Flemke's keen ability to anticipate potential problems and direct drivers away from trouble. After Flemke's death, the position of Chief Steward was not filled again, as it was believed that he could not be replaced.

== Influence on the sport ==
In addition to his driving and car-building accomplishments, Flemke was notable for his willingness to help his competitors. During his Eastern Bandits days, he shared his knowledge with southern drivers, which not only made them more competitive against him but also endeared him to them. Many years after Flemke's death, motorsport author Mark "Bones" Bourcier recalled a conversation with the highly experienced Junie Donlavey of Virginia, who had been involved in auto racing for more than 50 years. Donlavey, with tears in his eyes, remarked about Flemke, "When I get talking about him like this, it's like he just walked into this office yesterday and sat down right in this chair. And it's like that for a lot of us around here when it comes to Eddie. We never got over him." Bourcier noted that witnessing Donlavey's reaction "was one of the most poignant moments of my writing life."

Three-time NASCAR Modified Champion Bugs Stevens said, "Flemke was a smart, smart guy, a thinker... he was also an excellent teacher... he was one of my professors... [and] a terrific driver, a guy you could trust." As 1981 Talladega 500 winner Ron Bouchard put it, "He was a great gentleman and a great person... Even if Eddie thought you could beat him, he'd still come over to offer you help... He was a master of teaching... He got real enjoyment out of helping people... Eddie would help everybody."

Another Flemke protégé, Daytona 500 and Talladega 500 winner Pete Hamilton, said, "Eddie Flemke was my teacher and my hero. He changed everything for me." Four-time NASCAR Sportsman Champion Rene Charland noted that Flemke "taught me a lot," while driver and New London-Waterford race promoter Dick Williams remembered that Flemke was "always going around helping somebody get better – that's what I loved about Eddie Flemke."

Indianapolis 500 Rookie of the Year Denny Zimmerman said that the early 1960s "was a great time for me, just a kid back then, learning all I could about driving race cars and being mentored by the great Eddie Flemke... he taught me so much." Wilbur Jones, a close friend of nine-time NASCAR Modified champion Richie Evans, remembered that "Richie looked up to a lot of guys, and Eddie Flemke was number one. Why? Because Eddie was the master."

Journalist Pete Zanardi said that "Eddie was the guy so many other racers talked of as their guru" whom they "put on a pedestal," and described Flemke as "a Babe Ruth-like figure" in racing. Long-time Modified driver Elton Hill remarked, "If we're talking about short-track racing, I always felt Eddie was the king." Auto racing journalist and historian Bruce Cohen summarized Flemke's impact on racing: "He transcended his sport and the arena in which he competed. Lots of guys win races, but there was only one Eddie Flemke."

== Personal life and death ==
Flemke was married twice. His first marriage was to Christine Errede from 1953 to 1960, with whom he had two children, Paula and Ed Flemke Jr. In 1966, Flemke married Carolyn Goldsnider and remained married to her until his death. They had a daughter named Kristy. Paula married Ron Bouchard, a driver in Modifieds and later in the NASCAR Winston Cup, in 1983. Ed raced Modifieds from 1973 to 2023 and continued the Race Works race car building business that he started with his father.

Throughout his adult life, Flemke was a heavy smoker. He was known to light a cigarette in the middle of a race while driving with one hand.

In the early hours of March 30, 1984, Flemke drove the snowplow he had been operating back to his home and parked it in front of his house. When he did not emerge from the truck, his wife Carolyn went out to check on him. At the age of 53, Flemke had suffered a fatal heart attack. After his death, a section of the Stafford Motor Speedway grandstand was named in his honor.

== Major race wins ==
Some race wins:

- Riverside 500 (3 times)
- Bowman Gray Tobacco Bowl 150 (2 times)
- Utica-Rome New Yorker 400 (2 times)
- Thompson 300
- Stafford 200
- Stafford Spring Sizzler
- Eastern States 200
- Fredericksburg 250
- Empire Spring 250
- South Boston 200
- Old Dominion 300
- Fort Dix 200
- Autodrome de Quebec Val-Belair 150
- Southside 400
- Catamount Vermont 200
- Fulton 200
- Malta 200

== Recognition ==
- Race of Champions Hall of Fame
- New York State Stock Car Association Hall of Fame
- Eastern Motorsport Press Association Hall of Fame
- New England Auto Racers Hall of Fame
- Riverside Park Speedway Hall of Fame
- New Britain Sports Hall of Fame
- National Auto Racing Hall of Fame

There is a plaque of Flemke in the NASCAR Hall of Fame.

Member of State of Connecticut Advisory Committee on Stock Car Racing
