= 1981 Mason-Dixon 500 =

Auto race held at Dover Downs International Speedway in 1981

Race details
- Race 12 of 31 in the 1981 NASCAR Winston Cup Series season
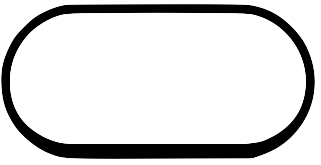
- Layout of Dover International Speedway
- Date: May 17, 1981
- Official name: Mason-Dixon 500
- Location: Dover Downs International Speedway, Dover, Delaware.
- Course: Permanent racing facility
- Course length: 1.000 miles (1.609 km)
- Distance: 500 laps, 500.0 mi (804.6 km)
- Weather: Temperatures reaching of 69.1 °F (20.6 °C); wind speeds of 8 miles per hour (13 km/h)
- Average speed: 116.595 miles per hour (187.641 km/h)
- Attendance: 40,000

Pole position
Driver	David Pearson	Kennie Childers
- Time: 26.007

Most laps led
Driver	Neil Bonnett	Wood Brothers Racing
- Laps: 404

Winner
No. 90	Jody Ridley	Donlavey Racing

Television in the United States
- Network: ESPN
- Announcers: Bob Jenkins

The 1981 Mason-Dixon 500 was a NASCAR Winston Cup Series race that took place on May 17, 1981, at Dover Downs International Speedway (now Dover International Speedway) in Dover, Delaware.

== Background ==
Dover Downs International Speedway, now called Dover International Speedway, is one of five short tracks to hold NASCAR races; the others are Bristol Motor Speedway, Richmond International Raceway, Martinsville Speedway, and Phoenix International Raceway. The NASCAR race makes use of the track's standard configuration, a four-turn short track oval that is 1 mile (1.6 km) long. The track's turns are banked at twenty-four degrees, and both the front stretch (the location of the finish line) and the backstretch are banked at nine degrees.

== Race report ==
Five hundred laps on a paved track of 1.000 mile or 1.609 kilometres per lap. It took four hours and seventeen minutes for Jody Ridley to defeat Bobby Allison by 22 seconds in front of 40,000 spectators. This race was the only win for Ridley, in a car numbered 90, and the only points paying win for Donlavey Racing in the NASCAR Winston Cup Series. However, this victory was controversial because Allison's team blamed a scoring error for his loss (even though Allison himself did not actually protest the win).

The winner would win $22,560 in prize money ($79,893 when adjusted for inflation) while the last place winner would take home $5,980 ($21,177 when adjusted for inflation). Two cautions slowed the race for 24 laps and the average racing speed was 116.925 miles per hour (188.173 km/h). David Pearson would win the pole position with a speed of 138.425 miles per hour (222.773 km/h). Darrell Waltrip got his Mountain Dew #11 Buick in trouble early when he lost control off Turn 4 and set off a multi-car crash. The Junior Johnson team managed to make repairs and get him back in the race, with the high attrition rate they salvaged a 12th-place finish and maintained their third-place position in the points.

David Pearson returned to the series for the first time since the Halpern team shut down after the owner's untimely death to take the wheel of Kennie Childers' #12 Kencoal Mining Oldsmobile. The new effort paired two legends of the sport with the "Silver Fox" driving and Jake Elder acting as crew chief with the pair winning the pole for this race. Pearson led early but a blown engine sent him to the sidelines just after the one-tenth mark. The partnership of Pearson and the Childers team ended up being a one-off effort.

Richard Petty was another contender who fell by the wayside. He was running fourth in this race when a rear end failure sent the #43 STP Buick to the sidelines for a 19th-place finish. Elmo Langley came out of retirement in a one-off for Lake Speed. Neil Bonnett was ahead by two laps over the field when he failed to finish the race after leading 404 laps.

All 32 drivers on the racing grid were American-born. Benny Parsons would finish last on the first lap due to a crash with Dave Marcis. The lowest finishing driver to finish the race was Cecil Gordon; who was 42 laps behind the lead lap. The tenth-place driver would finish 20 laps down from the lead lap drivers. There was a communication issue on lap 480 which put scoring of the race in jeopardy. Ridley's win was considered controversial because Allison claimed to have "won the race"; according to NASCAR team owner Harry Ranier.

=== Qualifying ===
Grid	No.	Driver	Manufacturer	Speed	Qualifying time	Owner
1	12	David Pearson	Oldsmobile	138.425	26.007	Kennie Childers
2	5	Morgan Shepherd	Pontiac	138.249	26.040	Cliff Stewart
3	21	Neil Bonnett	Ford	137.826	26.120	Wood Brothers
4	88	Ricky Rudd	Buick	136.773	26.321	DiGard
5	11	Darrell Waltrip	Buick	136.333	26.406	Junior Johnson
6	27	Cale Yarborough	Buick	136.276	26.417	M.C. Anderson
7	44	Terry Labonte	Buick	136.081	26.455	Billy Hagan
8	28	Bobby Allison	Buick	136.075	26.456	Harry Ranier
9	43	Richard Petty	Buick	135.998	26.471	Petty Enterprises
10	33	Harry Gant	Chevrolet	135.725	26.524	Hal Needham

== Finishing order ==
Section reference:

1. Jody Ridley (No. 90)
2. Bobby Allison (No. 28)
3. Dale Earnhardt† (No. 2)
4. D.K. Ulrich (No. 99)
5. Ricky Rudd (No. 88)
6. Morgan Shepherd (No. 5)
7. Buddy Arrington (No. 67)
8. Terry Labonte (No. 44)
9. Jimmy Means (No. 52)
10. Cale Yarborough* (No. 27)
11. Donnie Allison (No. 77)
12. Darrell Waltrip (No. 11)
13. Neil Bonnett*† (No. 21)
14. Tommy Gale† (No. 40)
15. Cecil Gordon† (No. 24)
16. Harry Gant* (No. 33)
17. Richard Childress* (No. 3)
18. James Hylton*† (No. 48)
19. Richard Petty* (No. 43)
20. Kyle Petty* (No. 42)
21. Mike Alexander* (No. 37)
22. Joe Fields* (No. 64)
23. J.D. McDuffie*† (No. 70)
24. Ronnie Thomas* (No. 25)
25. David Pearson*† (No. 12)
26. Junior Miller* (No. 79)
27. Ron Bouchard*† (No. 47)
28. Lowell Cowell* (No. 17)
29. Elmo Langley*† (No. 66)
30. Bob Riley* (No. 94)
31. Dave Marcis* (No. 71)
32. Benny Parsons*† (No. 15)

* Driver failed to finish race
† signifies that the driver is known to be deceased

== Timeline ==
Section reference:

- Start of race: David Pearson had the pole position to start things off.
- Lap 2: Caution called due to an accident involving Benny Parsons and four other drivers, ended on lap 13.
- Lap 18: Caution due to an accident involving Dale Earnhardt and four other drivers, ended on lap 29.
- Lap 42: Neil Bonnett took over the lead from David Pearson.
- Lap 57: David Pearson's engine just could not stand up to the pressures of high-speed racing.
- Lap 58: Cale Yarborough took over the lead from Neil Bonnett.
- Lap 59: Neil Bonnett took over the lead from Cale Yarborough.
- Lap 84: Cale Yarborough took over the lead from Neil Bonnett.
- Lap 85: Neil Bonnett took over the lead from Cale Yarborough.
- Lap 100: Cale Yarborough took over the lead from Neil Bonnett.
- Lap 104: Richard Petty took over the lead from Cale Yarborough.
- Lap 107: Neil Bonnett took over the lead from Richard Petty.
- Lap 161: J.D. McDuffie's engine just could not stand up to the pressures of high-speed racing.
- Lap 191: Cale Yarborough took over the lead from Neil Bennett.
- Lap 196: Neil Bonnett took over the lead from Cale Yarborough.
- Lap 297: Mike Alexander's engine just could not stand up to the pressures of high-speed racing.
- Lap 342: Kyle Petty's engine just could not stand up to the pressures of high-speed racing.
- Lap 412: Richard Childress' engine just could not stand up to the pressures of high-speed racing.
- Lap 448: Harry Gant's engine just could not stand up to the pressures of high-speed racing.
- Lap 459: Neil Bonnett's engine just could not stand up to the pressures of high-speed racing.
- Lap 460: Cale Yarborough took over the lead from Neil Bennett.
- Lap 480: Cale Yarborough's engine just could not stand up to the pressures of high-speed racing.
- Lap 481: Jody Ridley took over the lead from Cale Yarborough.
- Finish: Jody Ridley was officially declared the winner of the event.

== Standings after the race ==
Pos	Driver	Points	Differential
1	Bobby Allison	1900	0
2	Ricky Rudd	1733	-168
3	Darrell Waltrip	1694	-207
4	Harry Gant	1576	-325
5 ▲	Jody Ridley	1559	-342
6 ▼	Dale Earnhardt	1554	-347
7 ▼	Terry Labonte	1530	-371
8	Richard Petty	1455	-446
9	Benny Parsons	1402	-499
10 ▲	Buddy Arrington	1373	-528

Preceded by 1981 Melling Tool 420	NASCAR Winston Cup Series Season; 1981	Succeeded by 1981 World 600
