= 1982 Winston 500 =

Auto race held at Talladega Superspeedway in 1982

Race details
- Race 9 of 30 in the 1982 NASCAR Winston Cup Series season
- The program from the 1982 Winston 500.
- Date: May 2, 1982
- Official name: Winston 500
- Location: Alabama International Motor Speedway, Talladega, Alabama
- Course length: 2.660 miles (4.280 km)
- Distance: 188 laps, 500.1 mi (804.8 km)
- Weather: Cloudy with temperatures of 81.0 °F (27.2 °C); wind speeds averaging 3.3 miles per hour (5.3 km/h)
- Average speed: 156.597 miles per hour (252.018 km/h)
- Attendance: 100,000

Pole position
Driver	Benny Parsons	Ranier-Lundy Racing

Most laps led
Driver	Benny Parsons	Ranier-Lundy Racing
- Laps: 84

Winner
No. 11	Darrell Waltrip	Johnson Hodgdon Racing

Television in the United States
- Network: ESPN
- Announcers: Bob Jenkins; Larry Nuber

The 1982 Winston 500 was a NASCAR Winston Cup Series race that took place May 2, 1982, at Alabama International Motor Speedway in Talladega, Alabama.

The makes of the cars in the race were 1 Oldsmobile, 9 Pontiacs, 5 Fords, 1 Chevrolet, 1 Dodge, and 24 Buicks. The race is most well known for the debut of confidence trickster L.W. Wright.

== Background ==
Talladega Superspeedway, originally known as Alabama International Motor Superspeedway (AIMS), is a motorsports complex located north of Talladega, Alabama. It is located on the former Anniston Air Force Base in the small city of Lincoln. The track is a Tri-oval and was constructed by International Speedway Corporation, a business controlled by the France Family, in the 1960s. Talladega is most known for its steep banking and the unique location of the start/finish line - located just past the exit to pit road. The track currently hosts the NASCAR series such as the Sprint Cup Series, Xfinity Series, and the Camping World Truck Series. Talladega Superspeedway is the longest NASCAR oval with a length of 2.66 miles (4.28 km), and the track at its peak had a seating capacity of 175,000 spectators.

== Qualifying ==
Benny Parsons won the pole position with a qualifying speed of 200.176 miles per hour (322.152 km/h); the first 200+ MPH qualifying speed in NASCAR history. It broke the previous qualifying record of 199.658 miles per hour (321.318 km/h) set in 1970 by Bobby Isaac.

Grid	No.	Driver	Qual. speed
1	28	Benny Parsons	200.176
2	11	Darrell Waltrip	199.446
3	3	Ricky Rudd	199.388
4	44	Terry Labonte	197.860
5	50	Geoffrey Bodine	197.497
6	27	Cale Yarborough	197.379
7	9	Bill Elliott	196.609
8	47	Ron Bouchard	196.343
9	43	Richard Petty	195.993
10	71	Dave Marcis	195.705
11	02	Mark Martin	195.673
12	88	Bobby Allison	195.481
13	1	Buddy Baker	195.166
14	33	Harry Gant	195.035
15	42	Kyle Petty	194.686
16	98	Morgan Shepherd	194.473
17	37	Donnie Allison	194.181
18	96	Elliott Forbes-Robinson	193.749
19	21	Neil Bonnett	193.422
20	15	Dale Earnhardt	192.797
21	75	Joe Ruttman	194.200
22	62	Rick Wilson	194.098
23	24	Lennie Pond	191.559
24	2	Tim Richmond	191.555
25	99	Phillip Duffie	191.482
26	66	Lowell Cowell	191.444
27	73	Steve Moore	191.218
28	17	Lake Speed	190.719
29	54	David Simko	190.537
30	19	John Anderson	189.452
31	6	Dick May^{1}	189.141
32	67	Buddy Arrington	188.984
33	52	Jimmy Means	188.672
34	90	Jody Ridley	188.660
35	94	Tommy Gale	187.434
36	34	L.W. Wright	187.379
37	48	Slick Johnson	187.251
38	70	J.D. McDuffie	187.087
39	07	Bill Scott	186.824
40	40	Ferrell Harris	185.899

== Race report ==
There were 40 drivers on the grid; all of them were American-born. Darrell Waltrip defeated Terry Labonte by approximately three car lengths even though Labonte had a fender under Waltrip coming to the finish line. Waltrip earned $44,250 for winning the race ($144,179 when adjusted for inflation). In the final laps before the checkered flag, the race became a battle between Benny Parsons, Darrell Waltrip, Terry Labonte and Kyle Petty. Parsons would lead seven of those laps while Waltrip led 13 followed by Labonte leading two. The green flag was waved at 1:00 P.M. while the checkered flag was waved at approximately 4:19 P.M.; There were eight cautions for 39 laps. There were 51 lead changes and the average speed of the race was 156.597 miles per hour (252.018 km/h). The race covered 188 laps of the 2.660-mile (4.281 km) track, totaling 500.1 miles (804.8 km). Attendance was announced at 100,000 spectators.

David Simko crashed his vehicle on lap 4 while L. W. Wright blew his engine on lap 13. Further engine failures would be caused by Jody Ridley on lap 16, Cale Yarborough on lap 17 and Ron Bouchard on lap 23. Steve Moore's vehicle developed problems with its clutch that forced Moore out of the race on lap 32. Lake Speed blew his engine on lap 39 while Geoffrey Bodine did the same thing on lap 53. A valve sidelined Rick Wilson on lap 57. Lennie Pond would cause terminal damage to his vehicle on lap 66 while Dave Marcis blew his engine on the same lap. Elliott Forbes-Robinson would be relegated to the sidelines due to a nonworking engine on lap 73 while a problematic piston took Bill Scott out of the race on lap 75.

Richard Petty had an issue with his vehicle's fuel pump that would knock him out of the race on lap 82 while transmission problems took out Bill Elliott on lap 100. Buddy Baker developed steering problems with his vehicle on lap 109; forcing his early exit from the race. An engine issue took out Joe Ruttman on lap 159 and John Anderson on lap 164.

Terry Labonte took the championship lead after this race. Ferrel Harris would retire after this race with a 23rd-place finish. One-time NASCAR driver L. W. Wright would race his only professional stock car event on this day. The sole Chevrolet driver on the grid, L. W. Wright was a con artist who managed to swindle people into financing him getting a ride for this race, as well as an attempt at another at the next race where he failed to make the grid. His credentials as a licensed NASCAR driver were not requested during the early 1980s.

=== Results ===
Pos	Grid	Car No.	Driver	Team	Manufacturer	Laps	Laps Led	Time/Retired	Pts.
1	2	11	Darrell Waltrip	Johnson Hodgdon Racing	Buick	188	54	3:11:19	180
2	4	44	Terry Labonte	Hagan Enterprises	Buick	188	21	+1 car length	175
3	1	28	Benny Parsons	Ranier-Lundy Racing	Pontiac	188	84	+3 car lengths	175
4	15	42	Kyle Petty	Petty Enterprises	Pontiac	188	0	+4 car lengths	160
5	16	98	Morgan Shepherd	Benfield Racing	Buick	188	5	lead lap	160
6	17	37	Donnie Allison	Rogers Racing	Buick	186	1	+2 laps	155
7	24	2	Tim Richmond	Jim Stacy Racing	Buick	186	0	+2 laps	0
8	20	15	Dale Earnhardt	Bud Moore Engineering	Ford	186	3	+2 laps	147
9	33	52	Jimmy Means	Means Racing	Buick	184	0	+4 laps	138
10	11	02	Mark Martin	Bud Reeder Racing	Buick	184	0	+4 laps	134
11	32	67	Buddy Arrington	Arrington Racing	Dodge	184	1	+4 laps	135
12	37	48	Slick Johnson	Hylton Engineering	Buick	183	0	+5 laps	0
13	12	88	Bobby Allison	DiGard Motorsports	Buick	182	8	+6 laps	129
14	14	33	Harry Gant	Mach 1 Racing	Buick	182	4	+6 laps	126
15	31	6	Dick May^{1}		Buick	181	0	+7 laps	118
16	35	94	Tommy Gale	Langley Racing	Ford	180	0	+8 laps	115
17	25	99	Phillip Duffie (R)	Duffie Racing	Buick	179	0	+9 laps	112
18	38	70	J.D. McDuffie	McDuffie Racing	Pontiac	177	0	+11 laps	109
19	19	21	Neil Bonnett	Wood Brothers Racing	Ford	165	1	+13 laps	111
20	30	19	John Anderson	Gray Racing	Buick	164	0	Engine	103
21	26	66	Lowell Cowell	Hamby Racing	Buick	161	0	+27 laps	100
22	21	75	Joe Ruttman	RahMoc Enterprises	Pontiac	159	0	Engine	97
23	40	40	Ferrel Harris	Ulrich Racing	Buick	146	0	+42 laps	0
24	3	3	Ricky Rudd	Richard Childress Racing	Pontiac	116	1	+72 laps	96
25	13	1	Buddy Baker	Ellington Racing	Buick	109	0	Steering	88
26	7	9	Bill Elliott	Melling Racing	Ford	100	0	Transmission	85
27	9	43	Richard Petty	Petty Enterprises	Pontiac	82	0	Fuel pump	82
28	39	07	Bill Scott (R)	Brown Racing	Buick	75	0	Piston	79
29	18	96	Elliott Forbes-Robinson	Cronkrite Racing	Buick	73	0	Engine	76
30	10	71	Dave Marcis	Marcis Auto Racing	Buick	66	0	Contact	73
31	23	24	Lennie Pond	Gordon Racing	Buick	66	1	Contact	75
32	22	62	Rick Wilson	Wilson Racing	Oldsmobile	57	0	Valves	67
33	5	50	Geoffrey Bodine	Cliff Stewart Racing	Pontiac	53	0	Engine	0
34	26	17	Lake Speed	Hamby Racing	Buick	39	0	Engine	61
35	27	73	Steve Moore	Moore Racing	Pontiac	32	4	Clutch	63
36	8	47	Ron Bouchard	Race Hill Farm Team	Buick	23	0	Engine	55
37	6	27	Cale Yarborough	M. C. Anderson Racing	Buick	17	0	Engine	52
38	34	90	Jody Ridley	Donlavey Racing	Ford	16	0	Engine	49
39	36	34	L. W. Wright (R)	Music City Racing	Chevrolet	13	0	Engine	0^{2}
40	29	54	David Simko (R)	Simko Racing	Pontiac	4	0	Contact	43

==== Notes ====
- ^1 Sources conflict as to whether Dick May or D. K. Ulrich raced in the 1982 Winston 500.
- ^2 L. W. Wright did not receive any driver points, as a late entrant to the race.

== Standings after the race ==
Pos	Driver	Points	Differential
1	Terry Labonte	1410	0
2	Darrell Waltrip	1335	-75
3	Benny Parsons	1309	-101
4	Harry Gant	1258	-162
5	Bobby Allison	1225	-185
6 ▲	Morgan Shepherd	1189	-221
7 ▼	Dale Earnhardt	1183	-227
8 ▲	Buddy Arrington	1150	-260
9 ▼	Richard Petty	1101	-309
10 ▲	Jimmy Means	1064	-346

Preceded by 1982 Virginia National Bank 500	NASCAR Winston Cup Series Season; 1982	Succeeded by 1982 Cracker Barrel Country Store 420

Preceded by 1981	Winston 500 races 1982	Succeeded by 1983
