= Ed Flemke Jr. =

American racing driver (born 1955)

- Nationality: American
- Born: April 24, 1955 (age 71) Southington, Connecticut, U.S.

NASCAR Whelen Modified Tour career
- Debut season: 1988
- Years active: 1988–2013
- Former teams: Dean Palmer, Robert Garbarino, Jon Hummel, Hill Enterprises, Gary Teto, Don King
- Starts: 439
- Championships: 0
- Wins: 17
- Poles: 16
- Best finish: 2nd in 2004, 2006
- Statistics up to date as of July 31, 2024.

Ed Flemke Jr. (born April 24, 1955) is an American professional stock car racing driver who competed in the NASCAR Whelen Modified Tour, where he won seventeen races and earned sixteen pole positions from 1988 to 2013. He is the son of legendary driver Ed Flemke, one of the most well known modified drivers of his era. Flemke owns and operates the chassis building company Race Works, which is based in Berlin, Connecticut.

In 2021, Flemke became the first and only known LGBTQ+ winner of a NASCAR-sanctioned event when he married his long-time boyfriend, Christopher Barone-Flemke.

Flemke has also in series such as the SMART Modified Tour, the Tri-Track Open Modified Series, the IMSA GT Championship, and the World Series of Asphalt Stock Car Racing.

== Motorsports results ==
=== NASCAR ===
(key) (Bold – Pole position awarded by qualifying time. Italics – Pole position earned by points standings or practice time. * – Most laps led.)

==== Whelen Modified Tour ====
NASCAR Whelen Modified Tour results
Year	Car owner	No.	Make	1	2	3	4	5	6	7	8	9	10	11	12	13	14	15	16	17	18	19	20	21	22	23	24	25	26	NWMTC	Pts	Ref
1988	Dean Palmer	10	Chevy	ROU	MAR; 21	TMP; DNQ	MAR; DNQ	JEN; 23	IRP; 28	MND; 16	OSW; 24	OSW; 14	RIV; 20	JEN; 15	RPS; 20	TMP; 20	RIV; 20	OSW; 18	TMP; 15	OXF; 15	OSW; 9	TMP; 20	POC; 37	TIO; 15	TMP; 8	ROU; 17	MAR			14th	2208	
1989	Robert Garbarino	07	Chevy	MAR; 15	TMP																									19th	2010	
1989	Team Ten Motorsports	10	Chevy			MAR; 29	JEN; 22	STA; 14	IRP; 24	OSW; 21	WFD; 20	MND; 15	RIV	OSW; 18	JEN; 25	STA; 25	RPS; 23	RIV	OSW; 17	TMP; 30				TMP; 41	POC; 36	STA; 26	TIO; 25	MAR	TMP	19th	2010	
1989	N/A	41	Pontiac																		TMP; 31	RPS	OSW; 31							19th	2010	
1990	N/A	16	Chevy	MAR	TMP	RCH	STA	MAR	STA	TMP	MND	HOL	STA	RIV	JEN	EPP	RPS	RIV	TMP	RPS	NHA; 25	TMP	POC	STA	TMP	MAR				N/A	0	
1991	N/A	6	Chevy	MAR	RCH	TMP	NHA	MAR	NZH; 32	STA	TMP	FLE	OXF	RIV	JEN	STA	RPS	RIV	RCH	TMP	NHA									N/A	0	
1991	N/A	89	Chevy																			TMP; 36	POC							N/A	0	
1991	John Hummel	11	Chevy																					STA; 11	TMP	MAR; 30				N/A	0	
1992	John Hummel	11	Chevy	MAR; 25	TMP	RCH; 4	STA; 21	MAR; 25	NHA; 17	NZH; 27	STA; 5	TMP; DNQ	FLE; 3	RIV; 9	NHA; 21	STA; 17	RPS	RIV; 8	TMP; 16	TMP; 8	NHA; 7	STA; 9	MAR; 20	TMP; 12						15th	2410	
1992	N/A	26	Chevy									TMP; 14																		15th	2410	
1993	John Hummel	11	Chevy	RCH; 28	STA; 21	TMP; 20	NHA; 22	NZH; 32	STA; 4	RIV; 4	**NHA**; 4	RPS; 2	HOL; 6	LEE; 17	RIV; 11	STA; 18	TMP; 9*	TMP; 17	STA; 21	TMP; 17										11th	2059	
1994	John Hummel	11	Chevy	NHA; 30	STA; 12	TMP; 5	NZH; 10	STA; 17	LEE; 13	TMP; 28	RIV; 22	TIO; 1	NHA; 6	RPS; 15	HOL; 7	TMP; 26	RIV; 3	NHA; 3	STA; 21	SPE; 7	TMP; 37	NHA; 13	STA; 4	TMP; 24						9th	2583	
1995	John Hummel	11	Chevy	TMP; 11	NHA; 26	STA; 13	NZH; 13	STA; 23	LEE; 3	TMP; 1*	RIV; 26	BEE; 4	NHA; 9	JEN; 2	RPS; 17	HOL; 3	RIV; 6	NHA; 10	STA; 8	TMP; 29	NHA; 28	STA; 4	TMP; 2	TMP; 3						6th	2808	
1996	John Hummel	11	Chevy	TMP; 7	STA; 30	NZH; 7	STA; 1	NHA; 8	JEN; 20	RIV; 16	LEE; 10	RPS; 7	HOL; 4	TMP; 6	**RIV**; 15	NHA; 14	GLN; 27	STA; 3	NHA; 33	NHA; 8	STA; 18	FLE; 17	TMP; 4							8th	2568	
1997	N/A	11	Chevy	TMP; 5	**MAR**; 7	STA; 13	NZH; 15	STA; 17	NHA; 18	FLE; 24	JEN; 21	RIV; 10	GLN; 5	NHA; 11	RPS; 21	HOL; 4	TMP; 6	RIV; 10	NHA; 25	GLN; 19	STA; 22	NHA; 26	STA; 5	FLE; 9	TMP; 5	RCH; 4				9th	2902	
1998	Hill Enterprises	79	Pontiac	RPS; 5	TMP; 4	MAR; 25	STA; 25	NZH; 3	STA; 6	GLN; 6	JEN; 23							NHA; 32		STA; 7	NHA; 9	TMP; 23	STA; 4	TMP; 24	FLE; 1					6th	2908	
1998	Hill Enterprises	11	Pontiac									RIV; 4	NHA; 8	NHA; 13	LEE; 1		TMP; 16		RIV; 11											6th	2908	
1998	Hill Enterprises	11	Chevy													HOL; 10														6th	2908	
1999	Hill Enterprises	79	Pontiac	TMP; 18	RPS; 1	STA; 6	RCH; 18	STA; 20	RIV; 18	**JEN**; 23	NHA; 35	NZH; 1*	HOL; 7	TMP; 19	NHA; 40	RIV; 18	GLN; 26	STA; 1	RPS; 28	TMP; 25	NHA; 6	**STA**; 16	MAR; 25	TMP; 4						14th	2441	
2000	Hill Enterprises	79	Pontiac	STA; 3	RCH; 8	STA; 1*	RIV; 21	SEE; 8	NHA; 38	NZH; 5	TMP; 23	RIV; 24	GLN; 7	TMP; 23		**WFD**; 4	NHA; 36	STA; 6	MAR; 6	TMP; 15										9th	2106	
2000	Hill Enterprises	79	Chevy												STA; 16															9th	2106	
2001	Hill Enterprises	79	Pontiac	SBO; 23	TMP; 19	STA; 25	WFD; 21	NZH; 2	STA; 31	RIV; 20	SEE; 19	RCH; 6	NHA; 40	HOL; 1	RIV; 19	CHE; 18	TMP; 16	STA; 20	WFD; 1	TMP; 4	STA; 4	MAR; 25	TMP; 6							11th	2381	
2002	Hill Enterprises	79	Pontiac	TMP; 19	STA; 21	WFD; 13	NZH; 5	RIV; 19	SEE; 1*	RCH; 7	STA; 2	BEE; 19	NHA; 6	**RIV**; 1**	TMP; 1*	**STA**; 2*	WFD; 5	TMP; 22	NHA; 15*	STA; 29	MAR; 22	TMP; 7								6th	2562	
2003	Hill Enterprises	79	Pontiac	TMP; 37	STA; 17*	WFD; 23	NZH; 3	STA; 3	LER; 16	BLL; 24	BEE; 24	NHA; 17	ADI; 2	RIV; 18	TMP; 3	STA; 21*	WFD; 14	TMP; 12	NHA; 11	STA; 7	TMP; 2									8th	2235	
2004	Hill Enterprises	79	Pontiac	TMP; 2	STA; 3	WFD; 1	NZH; 4	STA; 11	RIV; 5	LER; 5	WAL; 5	BEE; 11	NHA; 7	SEE; 26	RIV; 11	STA; 13	TMP; 2	**WFD**; 4*	TMP; 1	NHA; 5	STA; 2	TMP; 24								2nd	2811	
2005	Gary Teto	10	Chevy	TMP; 23	STA; 17	RIV; 8	WFD; 15	STA; 14	JEN; 3	NHA; 16	BEE; 28	SEE; 23	RIV; 20	STA; 7	TMP; 27	WFD; 4	MAR; 22	TMP; 3	NHA; 5	STA; 24	TMP; 21									12th	2139	
2006	Gary Teto	10	Chevy	TMP; 18	STA; 27	JEN; 3*	TMP; 2	STA; 16	NHA; 4	HOL; 4	RIV; 10	STA; 7	TMP; 7	**MAR**; 9	TMP; 4	NHA; 7	**WFD**; 2	TMP; 18	STA; 9											2nd	2248	
2007	Gary Teto	10	Chevy	TMP; 26	STA; 23	WTO; 15	STA; 3	TMP; 20	NHA; 3	TSA; 13	RIV; 14	STA; 28	TMP; 5	MAN; 18	MAR; 14	NHA; 26	TMP; 24	STA; 11	TMP; 19											10th	1851	
2008	Gary Teto	10	Chevy	TMP; 1	STA; 27	STA; 6	TMP; 26	NHA; 3	SPE; 16	RIV; 19	STA; 2	TMP; 26	MAN; 24	TMP; 30	NHA; 16	MAR; 7	CHE; 13	STA; 11	TMP; 23											11th	1911	
2009	Gary Teto	10	Chevy	TMP; 16	STA; 10	STA; 12	NHA; 2	SPE; 20	RIV; 16	STA; 13	BRI; 7	TMP; 17	NHA; 30	MAR; 9	STA; 13	TMP; 14														10th	1602	
2010	Gary Teto	10	Chevy	TMP; 26	STA; 11	STA; 29	MAR; 23	NHA; 6	LIM; 8	MND; 21	RIV; 18	STA; 12	TMP; 16	BRI; 15	NHA; 26	STA; 24	TMP; 15													14th	1540	
2011	Gary Teto	10	Chevy	TMP; 11	STA; 16	STA; 27	MND; 26	TMP; 13	NHA; 8	RIV; 14	STA; 26	NHA; 17	BRI; 12		TMP; 11	LRP; 11	NHA; 12	STA; 11	TMP; 23											15th	1851	
2011	Hill Enterprises	19	Pontiac											DEL; 17																15th	1851	
2012	Don King	28	Chevy	TMP; 11	STA; 17	MND; 9	STA; 14	WFD; 20	NHA; 18	STA; 18	TMP; 20	BRI; 18	TMP; 21	RIV; 17	NHA; 13	STA; 18	TMP; 22													15th	380	
2013	Don King	28	Chevy	TMP; 14	STA; 16	STA; 22	WFD; 21	RIV; 10	NHA; 28	MND; 17	STA; 25	TMP; 12		RIV; 17	NHA; 10	STA; 21	TMP; 25													18th	365	
2013	Don King	26	Chevy										BRI; 13																	18th	365	
