= 1982 Daytona 500 =

Auto race held at Daytona International Speedway in 1982

Race details
- Race 1 of 30 in the 1982 NASCAR Winston Cup Series season
- 1982 Daytona 500 program cover
- Date: February 14, 1982
- Location: Daytona International Speedway, Daytona Beach, Florida
- Course: Permanent racing facility 2.5 mi (4.02336 km)
- Distance: 200 laps, 500 mi (804.672 km)
- Weather: Temperatures of 72 °F (22 °C); wind speeds of 13 miles per hour (21 km/h)
- Average speed: 153.991 miles per hour (247.824 km/h)
- Attendance: 120,000

Pole position
Driver	Benny Parsons	Harry Ranier

Most laps led
Driver	Bobby Allison	DiGard Motorsports
- Laps: 147

Winner
No. 88	Bobby Allison	DiGard Motorsports

Television in the United States
- Network: CBS
- Announcers: Ken Squier; David Hobbs; Ned Jarrett; Larry Nuber

The 1982 Daytona 500, the 24th running of the event, was the first race of the 1982 NASCAR Winston Cup season. It was the first time that the Daytona 500 was the first race of the season.

Bobby Allison would take the win in the #88 Gatorade-sponsored Buick Regal. Allison holds the distinction of leading the most laps in consecutive Daytona 500s in 1981 and 1982, and then win the next year. A live audience of 120,000 patrons witnessed a 194-minute race in which five cautions would slow the field for 34 laps; there were a total of 31 lead changes over the course of the 200 laps. Allison's margin of victory over Cale Yarborough was 23 seconds, more than half a lap.

No Chevrolet vehicles were in this race; the last time this happened was at the 1971 Space City 300 at Meyer Speedway in Texas.

This event marked the first Daytona 500 starts for Joe Ruttman, Ron Bouchard, Jim Sauter, Rick Wilson, Tom Sneva, Mark Martin, Delma Cowart, Rusty Wallace, and Lake Speed, the only Daytona 500 start for Lowell Cowell and the last Daytona 500 starts for Roy Smith, Gary Balough, Tighe Scott, Stan Barrett, Bobby Wawak, Donnie Allison, Billie Harvey, and Joe Millikan.

== Bumpergate ==
Allison's win drew controversy after his rear bumper fell off very early in the race. On lap 4, Harry Gant led Terry Labonte, with Bobby Allison and Cale Yarborough battling nose-to-tail for third. Going through turns three and four, Allison's rear bumper fell off and flew high into the air before landing back on the racing surface. Several cars took evasive action to avoid it, before it was run over by Joe Millikan (running in 20th position), causing him to veer to the outside wall coming out of turn four. This triggered a much larger crash, involving several cars towards the back of the pack, and brought out the first caution of the race. Three cars were out of the race (Millikan, Lake Speed, and Geoffrey Bodine), while others suffered minor damage.

After the bumper was off Allison's car, it was consistently faster than the competition allowing him to pull away to a significant lead despite other drivers working together in the draft. Yarborough's crew chief, Tim Brewer, later intimated that Allison's team had intended for the bumper to come off because they knew it would offer a major aerodynamic advantage, either using hollow bolts or very thin wire to attach it superficially to the car. Other observers also believed that the bumper was manipulated by the team to intentionally fall off, possibly by using simple tack welds, because the result would have the car underweight and give the car improved handling. Allison's crew chief Gary Nelson denied that and continues to deny it to this day. On The Dale Jr. Download, Nelson stated that crew members pop-riveted the bumper to the fenders due to the NASCAR officials stating that the bumper needed to be lower on the car instead of welding brackets to hold it on. Allison himself also denied the allegations until his death in 2024.

== Results ==
Pos	Grid	No.	Driver	Car Make	Laps	Status	Laps led	Points
1	7	88	Bobby Allison	Buick Regal	200	Running	147	185
2	3	27	Cale Yarborough	Buick Regal	200	Running	5	175
3	8	2	Joe Ruttman	Buick Regal	200	Running	0	165
4	5	44	Terry Labonte	Buick Regal	199	Running	3	165
5	20	9	Bill Elliott	Ford Thunderbird	198	Running	0	155
6	22	47	Ron Bouchard	Buick Regal	198	Running	0	150
7	2	33	Harry Gant	Buick Regal	198	Running	12	151
8	4	1	Buddy Baker	Buick Regal	198	Running	3	147
9	23	90	Jody Ridley	Ford Thunderbird	197	Running	0	138
10	38	30	Roy Smith	Pontiac Grand Prix	196	Running	0	134
11	31	75	Gary Balough	Pontiac Grand Prix	196	Running	0	130
12	17	5	Jim Sauter	Buick Regal	193	Running	5	132
13	33	70	J. D. McDuffie	Pontiac Grand Prix	193	Running	0	124
14	36	17	Lowell Cowell	Buick Regal	191	Running	0	121
15	39	67	Buddy Arrington	Chrysler Imperial	191	Running	0	118
16	42	64	Tommy Gale	Ford Thunderbird	185	Running	0	115
17	40	52	Jimmy Means	Buick Regal	185	Running	0	112
18	13	62	Rick Wilson	Oldsmobile Cutlass	182	Engine	0	109
19	24	98	Morgan Shepherd	Buick Regal	161	Engine	0	106
20	6	11	Darrell Waltrip	Buick Regal	151	Engine	9	108
21	9	51	A. J. Foyt	Oldsmobile Cutlass	145	Vibration	0	100
22	25	37	Tom Sneva	Buick Regal	144	Transmission	0	97
23	12	42	Kyle Petty	Pontiac Grand Prix	131	Engine	7	99
24	11	71	Dave Marcis	Buick Regal	131	Piston	3	96
25	14	21	Neil Bonnett	Ford Thunderbird	104	Crash	0	88
26	1	28	Benny Parsons	Pontiac Grand Prix	103	Crash	0	85
27	21	43	Richard Petty	Pontiac Grand Prix	103	Crash	0	82
28	18	96	Elliott Forbes-Robinson	Buick Regal	101	Crash	0	79
29	30	59	Tighe Scott	Buick Regal	81	Crash	0	76
30	26	02	Mark Martin	Buick Regal	75	Valve	0	73
31	41	6	Stan Barrett	Buick Regal	65	Engine	0	70
32	28	94	Bobby Wawak	Buick Regal	56	Engine	0	67
33	37	0	Delma Cowart	Buick Regal	55	Engine	0	64
34	29	18	Donnie Allison	Buick Regal	53	Oil Pressure	0	61
35	16	3	Ricky Rudd	Pontiac Grand Prix	51	Engine	0	58
36	10	15	Dale Earnhardt	Ford Thunderbird	44	Engine	6	60
37	19	72	Rusty Wallace	Buick Regal	40	Engine	0	52
38	15	13	Dick Brooks	Ford Thunderbird	24	Piston	0	49
39	35	31	Billie Harvey	Buick Regal	6	Valve	0	46
40	27	50	Joe Millikan	Pontiac Grand Prix	3	Crash	0	43
41	32	66	Lake Speed	Buick Regal	3	Crash	0	40
42	34	23	Geoffrey Bodine	Buick Regal	3	Crash	0	37

== Consolation race ==
Fourteen cars competed in a consolation race for non-qualifiers. Slick Johnson started from the pole in the event; he finished second, with Tim Richmond winning the 30-lap race. Ronnie Thomas, Bill Meazel and James Hylton rounded out the top five.

Richmond's race-winning car would later be used as a throwback scheme driven by Tyler Reddick in the 2024 Goodyear 400.

Preceded by 1981 Winston Western 500	NASCAR Winston Cup Series Season; 1981–82	Succeeded by 1982 Richmond 400
