= Southern Textile Association =

Nonprofit organization

The Southern Textile Association (STA) is a nonprofit trade organization for individuals in the textile and related industries with an interest in textile manufacturing. It was established in 1908.

STA members can network with their peers in all sectors of the textile industry.
