= Ron Bouchard =

American racing driver (1948–2015)

Ronald Bouchard
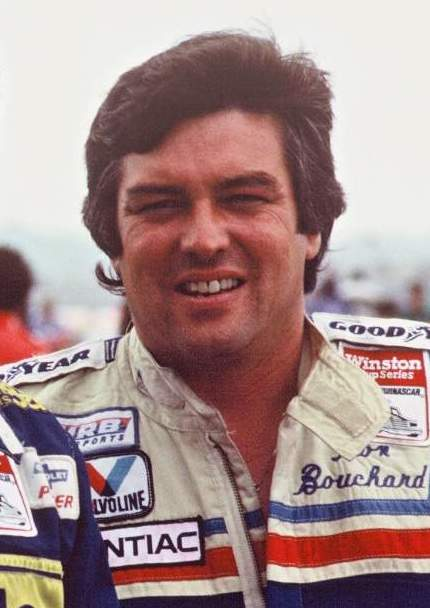
- Born: November 23, 1948; Fitchburg, Massachusetts, U.S.
- Died: December 10, 2015 (aged 67); Boston, Massachusetts, U.S.
- Cause of death: Cancer
- Awards: 1981 Winston Cup Series Rookie of the Year; New England Auto Racers Hall of Fame (1998)

NASCAR Cup Series career
- 160 races run over 7 years
- Best finish: 8th (1982)
- First race: 1981 Valleydale 500 (Bristol)
- Last race: 1987 Winston 500 (Talladega)
- First win: 1981 Talladega 500 (Talladega)
Wins	Top tens	Poles
1	60	3

NASCAR O'Reilly Auto Parts Series career
- 20 races run over 5 years
- Best finish: 31st (1984)
- First race: 1983 Darlington 250 (Darlington)
- Last race: 1987 Winn-Dixie 300 (Charlotte)
- First win: 1984 Dixie Cup 200 (Darlington)
- Last win: 1984 Darlington 200 (Darlington)
Wins	Top tens	Poles
2	8	4

Ronald Rodgers Bouchard (November 23, 1948 – December 10, 2015) was an American NASCAR driver who was the 1981 NASCAR Winston Cup Rookie of the Year. His brother Ken Bouchard was the 1988 NASCAR Winston Cup Rookie of the Year. His father-in-law, Ed Flemke, and brother-in-law, Ed Flemke Jr., were also NASCAR Modified racers.

== Local driving career ==
Bouchard began racing career at Brookline Speedway as a substitute driver in 1963 by replacing the ill driver for his father's car. After high school, he began racing in his father's car, and he rapidly moved up the ranks to late models at Seekonk Speedway. He claimed five consecutive track championships from 1967 to 1971. He began racing at other local tracks in the Camaro, and he was noticed by Bob Johnson.

Johnson quickly put Bouchard in his modified car at the famous Stafford Speedway, and he won his first of his 35 career victories at Stafford in April 1972. He won the 1973 and 1979 track modified championships. Bouchard also drove for car owners Bob Judkins (No. 2x, grandfather of RFK Racing driver Ryan Preece) and also Len Boehler (No. 3), where he won numerous races at Stafford Speedway, Thompson Speedway, Seekonk Speedway, Waterford Speedbowl and Westboro Speedway. One of Bouchard's biggest modified victories came at Thompson Speedway driving Dick Armstrong's No. 1 in the Thompson 300 in 1980.

Bouchard was also a notable rival of fellow New Englander, Geoff Bodine, whom he beat several times for modified victories and vice versa. Bodine also beat Bouchard in the NASCAR race at Martinsville in 1984. In spite of their rivalry, however, Bodine recommended Bouchard when Hendrick Motorsports began their Busch Series program later in 1984, allowing Bouchard to drive one race for the team.

== NASCAR career ==
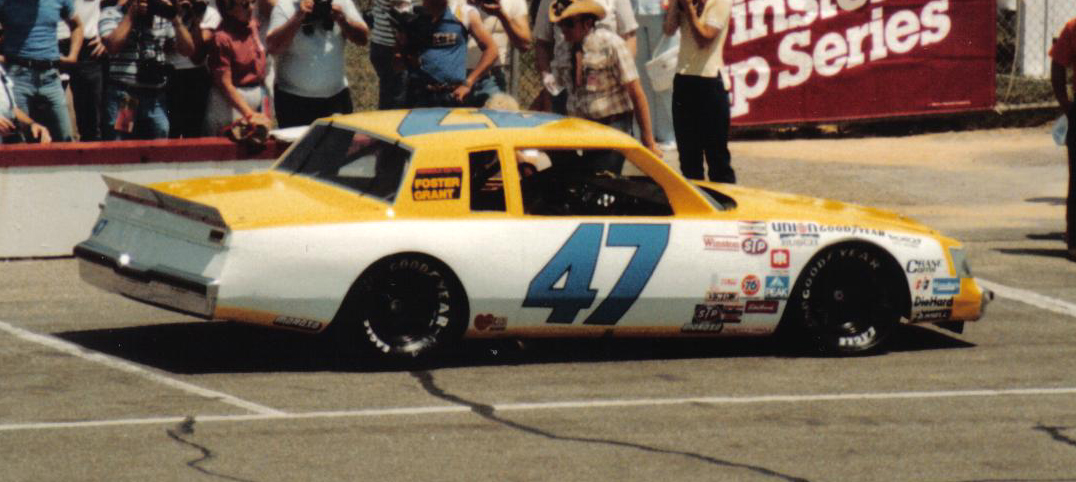
1983 racecar

Bouchard began his NASCAR career in 1981 in the No. 47 Jim Stacy Buick for owner Jack Beebe (Race Hill Farm team). He captured the 1981 NASCAR Rookie of the Year title even though he only raced in 22 of 31 events. He posted twelve top-ten finishes in the 22 races, including his only career win, in the Talladega 500 at Talladega Superspeedway. Running third to Darrell Waltrip and Terry Labonte on the last lap, he swooped under both of them as they battled side by side out of the final turn. The three cars crossed the finish line nearly simultaneously, with Bouchard winning in a photo finish. After the race, Waltrip, who had been watching Labonte and not seen Bouchard pass him, asked, "Where the hell did he come from?" Waltrip has stated in interviews over the race that part of the reason he lost was because he did not try to block Bouchard as he believed that Bouchard was a lap down.

Bouchard's victory is considered by many as the biggest upset in NASCAR history and the win essentially clinched the Cup Series rookie of the year award for Bouchard. In 1982, Bouchard finished a career-high eighth in the final points standing with fifteen top-ten finishes in thirty races. He ran full-time in 1983, 1984, and 1985. He finished between eleventh and sixteenth in the final points standing each of those years. Bouchard also came close to winning races at Martinsville in 1984 (finishing second to Geoff Bodine) and Rockingham in 1985 (where the roles of Talladega were reversed and he finished second to Waltrip).

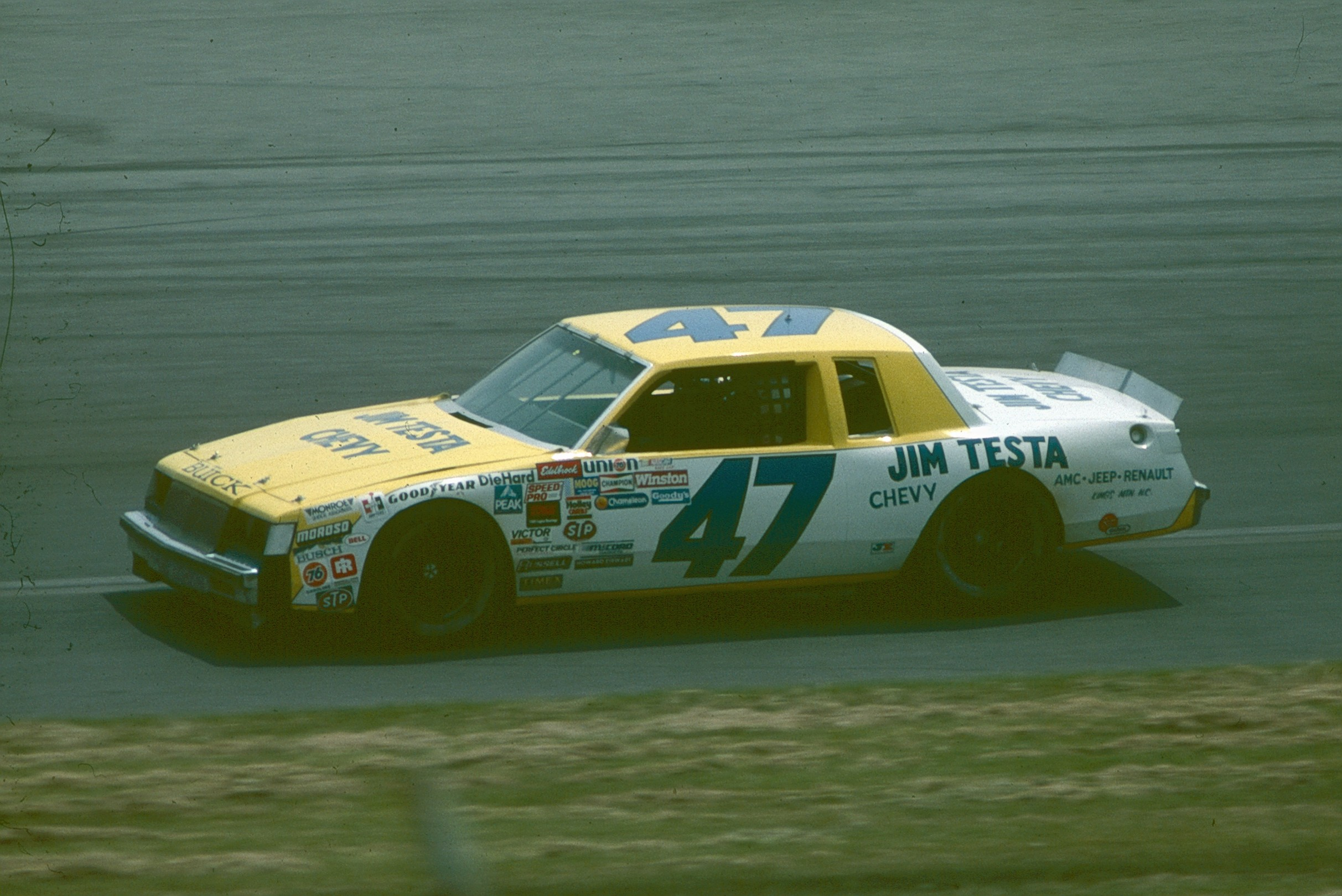
1984 racecar

In 1986, Bouchard changed to the No. 98 Valvoline Pontiac for owner Mike Curb (Curb Agajanian Performance Group). The team generally finished in the top-twenty when they completed a race, but they had nine DNFs (did not finish) in their seventeen events.

In 1987, Bouchard raced in the No. 1 Bull's Eye Barbecue Sauce Chevrolet for owner Hoss Ellington in five events. Their two finishes were eighth and twelfth.

== Awards ==
In 1998, Bouchard was inducted into the New England Auto Racers Hall of Fame in its inaugural class.

In 2016, New England Auto Racers Hall of Fame began awarding the Ron Bouchard Award for lifetime service to motorsport in the area.

== After racing ==
After racing in Winston Cup, Bouchard returned home to Fitchburg, Massachusetts, opening Ron Bouchard's Auto Stores, which currently represents Honda, Acura, Stellantis, Kia, and Nissan.

Bouchard married Paula Flemke, daughter of New England Modified racer "Steady" Ed Flemke Sr. and sister to Ed Flemke Jr., in June 1983. The couple had five children—Eugene, Robert, Michelle, Tracey, and Chad. Chad once played golf on the PGA Tour Latinoamerica and Korn Ferry Tour after coming from the University of Tampa before settling into the dealership, currently serving as General Manager for Ron Bouchard Auto Stores.

In September 2015, Bouchard opened a museum at his Stellantis dealership celebrating his motorsport history, three months before his death to cancer on December 10, 2015.

== Motorsports career results ==
=== NASCAR ===
(key) (Bold – Pole position awarded by qualifying time. Italics – Pole position earned by points standings or practice time. * – Most laps led.)

==== Winston Cup Series ====
NASCAR Winston Cup Series results
Year	Team	No.	Make	1	2	3	4	5	6	7	8	9	10	11	12	13	14	15	16	17	18	19	20	21	22	23	24	25	26	27	28	29	30	31	NWCC	Pts	Ref
1981	Race Hill Farm Team	47	Buick	RSD	DAY	RCH	CAR	ATL	BRI; 24	NWS; 8	DAR; 27		TAL; 20	NSV	DOV; 27	CLT; 26	TWS	RSD	MCH; 10	DAY; 9	NSV	POC; 10	TAL; 1	**MCH**; 29	BRI; 5	DAR; 11	RCH; 25	DOV; 4	MAR; 6	NWS; 5	CLT; 5	CAR; 11	ATL; 39	RSD; 10	21st	2594	
1981	Race Hill Farm Team	47	Pontiac									MAR; 9																							21st	2594	
1982	Race Hill Farm Team	47	Buick	DAY; 6	RCH; 9	BRI; 8	ATL; 36	CAR; 16	DAR; 34	NWS; 13	MAR; 19	TAL; 36	NSV; 3	DOV; 6	CLT; 10	POC; 31	RSD; 9	**MCH**; 12	DAY; 3	NSV; 10	POC; 4	TAL; 34	MCH; 10		DAR; 26			NWS; 7		MAR; 14	CAR; 8	ATL; 32	RSD; 6		8th	3545	
1982	Race Hill Farm Team	47	Olds																					BRI; 12		RCH; 15	DOV; 8		CLT; 35						8th	3545	
1983	Race Hill Farm Team	47	Buick	DAY; 26	RCH; 12	CAR; 20	ATL; 12	DAR; 18	NWS; 11	MAR; 7	TAL; 20	NSV; 9	DOV; 34	BRI; 7	CLT; 41	RSD	POC; 34	MCH; 28	DAY; 4	**NSV**; 27	POC; 13	TAL; 12	MCH; 12	BRI; 7	DAR; 32	RCH; 25	DOV; 16	MAR	NWS; 7	CLT; 15	CAR; 6	ATL; 35	RSD; 11		16th	3113	
1984	Race Hill Farm Team	47	Buick	DAY; 27	RCH; 29	CAR; 21	ATL; 12	BRI; 3	NWS; 7	DAR; 17	MAR; 2	TAL; 10	NSV; 5	DOV; 9	CLT; 3	RSD; 19	POC; 19	MCH; 20	DAY; 34	NSV; 4	POC; 7	TAL; 16	MCH; 10	BRI; 14	DAR; 33	RCH; 13	DOV; 8	MAR; 19	CLT; 11	NWS; 28	CAR; 14	ATL; 12	RSD; 35		11th	3609	
1985	Race Hill Farm Team	47	Buick	DAY; 38	RCH; 4	CAR; 33	ATL; 7	BRI; 17	DAR; 16	NWS; 13	MAR; 28	TAL; 28	DOV; 20	CLT; 29	RSD; 32	POC; 29	MCH; 13	DAY; 4	POC; 9	TAL; 3	MCH; 38	BRI; 7	DAR; 5	RCH; 18	DOV; 8	MAR; 6	NWS; 6	CLT; 26	CAR; 2	ATL; 16	RSD; 10				13th	3267	
1986	Curb Racing	98	Pontiac	DAY; 6	RCH; 18		ATL; 40	BRI; 25	DAR; 37	NWS; 17	MAR	TAL; 9	DOV; 27	CLT; 19	RSD	POC; 12	MCH; 36	DAY; 41	POC	TAL; 17	GLN	MCH	BRI	DAR; 30	RCH	DOV	MAR	NWS	CLT; 21	CAR	ATL; 42	RSD			31st	1553	
1986	Curb Racing	98	Buick			CAR; 13																													31st	1553	
1987	Ellington Racing	1	Chevy	DAY; 32	CAR; 36	RCH	ATL; 12	DAR; 8	NWS	BRI	MAR																								48th	440	
1987	Ellington Racing	1	Buick									TAL; 38	CLT	DOV	POC	RSD	MCH	DAY	POC	TAL	GLN	MCH	BRI	DAR	RCH	DOV	MAR	NWS	CLT	CAR	RSD	ATL			48th	440	

===== Daytona 500 =====
Year	Team	Manufacturer	Start	Finish
1982	Race Hill Farm Team	Buick	22	6
1983	Race Hill Farm Team	Buick	23	26
1984	Race Hill Farm Team	Buick	18	27
1985	Race Hill Farm Team	Buick	15	38
1986	Curb Racing	Pontiac	14	6
1987	Ellington Racing	Chevy	17	32

==== Busch Series ====
NASCAR Busch Series results
Year	Team	No.	Make	1	2	3	4	5	6	7	8	9	10	11	12	13	14	15	16	17	18	19	20	21	22	23	24	25	26	27	28	29	30	31	32	33	34	35	NBGNC	Pts	Ref
1983	Boehler's Racing	08	Pontiac	DAY	RCH	CAR	HCY	MAR	NWS	SBO	GPS	LGY	DOV	BRI	CLT	SBO	HCY	ROU	SBO	ROU	CRW	ROU	SBO	HCY	LGY	IRP	GPS	BRI	HCY	DAR; 5	RCH	NWS	SBO	MAR	ROU				61st	320	
1983	Race Hill Farm Team	74	Pontiac																																	CLT; 3	HCY	MAR	61st	320	
1984	DuBee Racing	47	Pontiac	DAY; 26	RCH	CAR; 3	HCY	MAR	**DAR**; 1	ROU	NSV	LGY	MLW		CLT; 22*	SBO	HCY	ROU	SBO	ROU	HCY	IRP	LGY	SBO	BRI	**DAR**; 1*	RCH	NWS	CLT; 28	HCY	CAR; 2	MAR							31st	956	
1984	All-Star Racing	15	Pontiac											**DOV**; 2																									31st	956	
1985	Race Hill Farm Team	47	Buick	DAY; 28	CAR	HCY	BRI	MAR	DAR; 25	SBO	LGY	DOV	CLT; 40	SBO	HCY	ROU	IRP	SBO	LGY	HCY	MLW	**BRI**; 24	DAR; 29	RCH	NWS	ROU	CLT; 11	HCY	CAR	MAR; 23									42nd	507	
1986	Spencer Racing	28	Pontiac	DAY; 4	CAR	HCY	MAR	BRI	DAR	SBO	LGY	JFC	DOV	CLT	SBO	HCY	ROU	IRP	SBO	RAL	OXF	SBO	HCY	LGY	ROU	BRI	DAR	RCH	DOV	MAR	ROU	CLT	CAR	MAR					98th	0	
1987	Shepherd Racing	97	Buick	DAY; 40	HCY	MAR	DAR	BRI	LGY	SBO																													67th	80	
1987	Shugart Racing	90	Buick								CLT; 42	DOV	IRP	ROU	JFC	OXF	SBO	HCY	RAL	LGY	ROU	BRI	JFC	DAR	RCH	DOV	MAR	CLT	CAR	MAR									67th	80	
